= 2023–24 FCSB season =

FCSB
2023–24 season
- President: Valeriu Argăseală
- Manager: Elias Charalambous
- Stadium: Arena Națională
- SuperLiga: 1st
- Cupa României: Group stage
- Conference League: Third qualifying round
- Top goalscorer: League: Florinel Coman (18); All: Florinel Coman (19)
- Highest home attendance: 54,673
- Lowest home attendance: 5,723
- Average home league attendance: 19,934
Home colours	Away colours	Third colours

The 2023–24 season was FCSB's 76th season since its founding in 1947.

== Previous season positions ==
	Competition	Position
(European Union)	UEFA Europa Conference League	Group stage
(Romania)	Liga I	2nd
(Romania)	Cupa României	Group stage

== Season overview ==
=== Current squad ===
As of 19 May 2024

Note: Flags indicate national team as defined under FIFA eligibility rules; some limited exceptions apply. Players may hold more than one non-FIFA nationality.

No.	Pos.	Nation	Player
1	GK	ROU	Mihai Udrea
2	DF	ROU	Valentin Crețu
3	DF	ROU	Ionuț Panțîru
5	DF	CMR	Joyskim Dawa
6	DF	ROU	Denis Haruț
7	FW	ROU	Florinel Coman
8	MF	ROU	Adrian Șut (vice-captain)
10	MF	ROU	Octavian Popescu
11	FW	ROU	David Miculescu
12	GK	ROU	Alexandru Maxim
16	MF	ROU	Mihai Lixandru
18	MF	ROU	Andrei Pandele
19	FW	BRA	Luis Phelipe
20	DF	GHA	Nana Antwi
21	DF	ROU	Vlad Chiricheș (3rd captain)

No.	Pos.	Nation	Player
22	MF	ROU	Mihai Toma
23	DF	ROU	Ovidiu Popescu
24	DF	ROU	Ricardo Pădurariu
25	FW	ROU	Alexandru Băluță
26	MF	ROU	Mátyás László
27	MF	ROU	Darius Olaru (captain)
28	DF	ROU	Alexandru Pantea
29	DF	ROU	Matei Manolache
30	DF	RSA	Siyabonga Ngezana
32	GK	ROU	Ștefan Târnovanu
33	DF	MNE	Risto Radunović (4th captain)
42	MF	GHA	Baba Alhassan
80	MF	ROU	Eduard Radaslavescu
98	FW	ROU	David Popa
99	GK	ROU	Andrei Vlad

=== Transfers ===
==== In ====
No.	Pos.	Player	Transferred from	Fee	Date	Source
22	FW	(Romania) Valentin Gheorghe	(Turkey) Ümraniyespor	Loan Return	30 June 2023	
30	MF	(Romania) Alexandru Musi	(Romania) Politehnica Iași	Loan Return	30 June 2023	
—	MF	(Romania) Ovidiu Perianu	(Romania) Chindia Târgoviște	Loan Return	30 June 2023	
—	FW	(Romania) Ianis Stoica	(Romania) Universitatea Cluj	Loan Return	30 June 2023	
—	MF	(Romania) Ovidiu Horșia	(Romania) Universitatea Cluj	Loan Return	30 June 2023	
16	MF	(Romania) Mihai Lixandru	(Romania) Mioveni	Loan Return	30 June 2023	
18	MF	(Romania) Andrei Pandele	(Romania) Gloria Buzău	Loan Return	30 June 2023	
1	GK	(Romania) Mihai Udrea	(Romania) Viitorul Târgu Jiu	Loan Return	30 June 2023	
25	MF	(Romania) Alexandru Băluță	(Hungary) Puskás Akadémia	Free Transfer	1 July 2023	
88	MF	(Croatia) Damjan Đoković	(Saudi Arabia) Al Raed	Free Transfer	1 July 2023	
30	DF	(South Africa) Siyabonga Ngezana	(South Africa) Kaizer Chiefs	€600,000	1 July 2023	
21	DF	(Romania) Vlad Chiricheș	(Italy) Cremonese	Free Transfer	25 July 2023	
20	FW	(Romania) Dan Spătaru	(Romania) Kids Tâmpa Brașov	Loan fee: €30,000	1 September 2023	
24	DF	(Romania) Cristian Ganea	(Greece) Panathinaikos	Free Transfer	6 September 2023	
29	FW	(Romania) Dorin Rotariu	(Bulgaria) Ludogorets Razgrad	Free Transfer	10 October 2023	
42	MF	(Ghana) Baba Alhassan	(Romania) Hermannstadt	€600,000	1 January 2024	
19	FW	(Brazil) Luis Phelipe	(Romania) Politehnica Iași	€200,000	1 January 2024	
20	DF	(Ghana) Nana Antwi	(Armenia) Urartu	€50,000	12 January 2024	
—	FW	(Romania) Ianis Stoica	(Romania) Universitatea Cluj	Loan Return	2 February 2024	

==== Out ====
No.	Pos.	Player	Transferred to	Fee	Date	Source
19	FW	(Algeria) Billel Omrani	(Romania) Petrolul Ploiești	End of contract	30 June 2023	
16	DF	(Estonia) Joonas Tamm	(Bulgaria) Botev Plovdiv	End of contract	30 June 2023	
24	MF	(North Macedonia) Boban Nikolov	(Hungary) Kisvárda	End of contract	30 June 2023	
—	MF	(Romania) Ovidiu Horșia	(Romania) Alexandria	End of contract	30 June 2023	
17	DF	(Romania) Iulian Cristea	(Romania) Rapid București	Released	30 June 2023	
26	MF	(Romania) Răzvan Oaidă	(Romania) Rapid București	Released	30 June 2023	
77	DF	(Romania) Sorin Șerban	(Romania) Politehnica Iași	Released	30 June 2023	
22	DF	(Romania) Deian Sorescu	(Poland) Raków Częstochowa	End of loan	30 June 2023	
30	MF	(Romania) Alexandru Musi	(Romania) Petrolul Ploiești	Loan	1 July 2023	
25	MF	(Romania) Ovidiu Perianu	(Romania) Universitatea Cluj	Loan	1 July 2023	
9	FW	(Romania) Ianis Stoica	(Romania) Universitatea Cluj	Loan	1 July 2023	
—	MF	(Romania) Aurelian Ciuciulete	(Romania) Unirea Dej	Loan	27 July 2023	
14	MF	(Romania) Matei Tănasă	(Romania) Gloria Buzău	Loan	30 July 2023	
18	MF	(France) Malcom Edjouma	(Italy) Bari	Loan fee: €200,000	17 August 2023	
98	FW	(Romania) Andrei Cordea	(Saudi Arabia) Al-Tai FC	€1,320,000	22 August 2023	
22	FW	(Romania) Valentin Gheorghe	(Romania) Universitatea Cluj	Released	23 August 2023	
88	MF	(Croatia) Damjan Đoković	(Romania) Rapid București	Released	7 January 2024	
24	DF	(Romania) Cristian Ganea	(Romania) Farul Constanța	Released	15 January 2024	
15	MF	(Romania) George Gogescu	(Romania) Concordia Chiajna	Loan	28 January 2024	
29	FW	(Romania) Dorin Rotariu	Free agent	Released	1 February 2024	
—	FW	(Romania) Ianis Stoica	(Romania) Hermannstadt	Released	7 February 2024	
9	FW	(Italy) Andrea Compagno	(China) Tianjin Tiger	€120,000	10 February 2024	

==== Overall transfer activity ====
===== Expenditure =====
Summer:▼€630,000

Winter:▼€850,000

Total:▼€1,480,000

===== Income =====
Summer: ▲€1,520,000

Winter: ▲€120,000

Total:▲€1,640,000

===== Net Totals =====
Summer: ▲€890,000

Winter: ▼€730,000

Total: ▲€160,000

== Friendly matches ==
Win Draw Loss

1 July 2023	Anderlecht (Belgium)	5–2	(Romania) FCSB	Apeldoorn, Netherlands
14:00 EEST (UTC+3)	Raman 17', 58'; Dreyer 106'; Arnstad 117'; Sardella 120'	Report	Coman 12'; Compagno 40'	Stadium: WWNA

5 July 2023	PAOK (Greece)	1–1	(Romania) FCSB	Swolgen, Netherlands
19:30 EEST (UTC+3)	Gordeziani 78'	Report	Coman 24'	Stadium: Sportpark Sporting Swolgen Tienray

14 January 2024	FCSB (Romania)	3–1	(Austria) LASK	Belek, Turkey
10:00 EEST (UTC+3)	Phelipe 21'; Coman 64'; Miculescu 75'		Ljubičić 70'	Stadium: Gloria Sports Arena

23 March 2024	FCSB (Romania)	1–1	(Romania) Gloria Buzău	Bucharest, Romania
	Miculescu 41'		Tănasă 7'	Stadium: Baza Sportivă FCSB

== Competitions ==
Win Draw Loss

=== Overview ===
Competition	First match	Last match	Starting round	Final position	Record							
Competition	First match	Last match	Starting round	Final position	Pld	W	D	L	GF	GA	GD	Win %
SuperLiga	16 July 2023	May 2024	Matchday 1	1st	40	24	9	7	65	39	+26	60.00
Cupa României	October 2023	7 December 2023	Group stage	Group stage	3	1	1	1	3	3	+0	33.33
Conference League	27 July 2023	17 August 2023	Second qualifying round	Third qualifying round	4	2	1	1	4	4	+0	50.00
Total					47	27	11	9	72	46	+26	57.45

Last updated: 19 May 2024.
Source: Competitions

=== SuperLiga ===
==== Regular season ====
===== Table =====
Pos	Team	Pld	W	D	L	GF	GA	GD	Pts	Qualification
1	FCSB	30	19	7	4	53	28	+25	64	Qualification to play-off round
2	Rapid București	30	15	10	5	55	32	+23	55	Qualification to play-off round
3	CFR Cluj	30	15	8	7	54	29	+25	53	Qualification to play-off round
4	Universitatea Craiova	30	13	10	7	47	38	+9	49	Qualification to play-off round
5	Farul Constanța	30	11	10	9	37	38	−1	43 (Note: Head to head points: Farul Constanța 6, Sepsi OSK 0)	Qualification to play-off round

Source: , Soccerway
Rules for classification: 1) Points; 2) Head-to-head points; 3) Head-to-head goal difference; 4) Head-to-head goals scored; 5) Goal difference; 6) Goals scored; 7) Play-off.

===== Results summary =====
Overall								Home						Away					
Pld	W	D	L	GF	GA	GD	Pts	W	D	L	GF	GA	GD	W	D	L	GF	GA	GD
30	19	7	4	53	28	+25	64	10	3	2	26	12	+14	9	4	2	27	16	+11

Last updated: 9 March 2024 (UTC).
Source: FCSB

===== Position by round =====
Round	1	2	3	4	5	6	7	8	9	10	11	12	13	14	15	16	17	18	19	20	21	22	23	24	25	26	27	28	29	30
Ground	A	H	A	H	A	H	A	H	A	A	H	A	H	A	H	H	A	H	A	H	A	H	A	H	H	A	H	A	H	A
Result	W	W	W	W	D	W	L	W	W	W	D	W	D	D	L	W	W	L	D	W	W	W	W	D	W	D	W	W	W	L
Position	1	3	1	1	1	1	1	1	1	1	1	1	1	1	1	1	1	1	1	1	1	1	1	1	1	1	1	1	1	1

Updated to match(es) played on 9 March 2024 (UTC). Source: Matches
A = Away; H = Home; W = Win; D = Draw; L = Loss

===== Results =====
16 July 2023 1	U Craiova 1948	1–3	FCSB	Târgu Jiu
21:30 EEST (UTC+03)	Sidibe 70' (pen.); Albu (yellow card) 76'		Miculescu 8'; Coman 17' (pen.); Edjouma (yellow card) 55', (goal) 60'; Radunović (yellow card) 75'	Stadium: Constantina Diță-Tomescu; Attendance: 11,200; Referee: Radu Petrescu; Assistant referees: Mircea Grigoriu, Radu Ghinguleac; Fourth official: Bogdan Dumitrache

22 July 2023 2	FCSB	2–1	Dinamo București	Bucharest
21:30 EEST (UTC+03)	Dawa (yellow card) 20'; Coman 30'; Olaru 35'; Edjouma (yellow card) 80'; Campagno (yellow card) 90+1'		Grigore (yellow card) 27'; Larrucea (yellow card) 33'; Gregório 83'	Stadium: Arcul de Triumf; Attendance: 6,132; Referee: Sebastian Colțescu; Assistant referees: Marius Marica, Adrian Popescu; Fourth official: Andrei Antonie

29 July 2023 3	Oțelul Galați	0–2	FCSB	Galați
21:30 EEST (UTC+03)	Jardan (yellow card) 45+2'; Rus (yellow card) 90+3'		Oct. Popescu 40'; Coman (penalty missed); Pantea (yellow card) 67'; Campagno (yellow card) 70', (goal) 90+1'	Stadium: Oțelul; Attendance: 12,897; Referee: Iulian Dima; Assistant referees: Florin Pucheanu, Mircea Orbuleţ; Fourth official: Vlad Baban

6 August 2023 4	FCSB	1–0	CFR Cluj	Bucharest
21:30 EEST (UTC+03)	Chiricheș (yellow card) 8'; Cordea (yellow card) 43'; Campagno 66' (pen.); Oct. Popescu (yellow card) 85'; Șut (yellow card) 90+5'		Morgan (yellow card) 47'; Ajeti (yellow card) 54'; Avounou (yellow card) 63'	Stadium: Stadionul Steaua; Attendance: 28,519; Referee: Marcel Bîrsan; Assistant referees: Mihai Marica, Imre-Laszlo Bucsi; Fourth official: Bogdan Dumitrache

20 August 2023 6	FCSB	2–1	Politehnica Iași	Bucharest
21:30 EEST (UTC+03)	Coman (yellow card) 40'; Ov. Popescu 44'; Radunović (yellow card) 48'; Olaru 69', (yellow card) 77'		Jatobá (yellow card) 33'; Martac (yellow card) 38'; Vașvari 79'	Stadium: Arena Națională; Attendance: 13,257; Referee: Marian Barbu; Assistant referees: Marius Badea, Stelian Slabu; Fourth official: Viorel Flueran

28 August 2023 7	UTA Arad	2–1	FCSB	Arad
21:30 EEST (UTC+03)	Stahl (yellow card) 13'; Fábry 18' (pen.); Cooper 60'; Freitas (yellow card) 67'; Stolnik (yellow card) 76'; Iacob (yellow card) 85'; Abeid (yellow card) 86'; Dumitrașcu (yellow card) 90+6'		Coman 4', (yellow card) 76', (yellow card) 83' (yellow-red card); Pantea (yellow card) 17', (yellow card) 45+4' (yellow-red card); Compagno (yellow card) 62'	Stadium: Francisc von Neuman; Attendance: 10,763; Referee: George Găman; Assistant referees: Adrian Popescu, Raul Ghiciulescu; Fourth official: Marius Omuţ

2 September 2023 8	FCSB	3–0	Universitatea Craiova	Bucharest
21:45 EEST (UTC+03)	Ov. Popescu (yellow card) 4'; Olaru 13', 45'; Radunović 21'; Oct. Popescu (yellow card) 56'		Ndong (yellow card) 25'; Ivan (yellow card) 36'; Zajkov (yellow card) 38'; Bancu (yellow card) 42'; Screciu (yellow card) 57'; Houri (yellow card) 80'; Kurtić (yellow card) 90+1'	Stadium: Stadionul Steaua; Attendance: 21,304; Referee: Adrian Cojocaru; Assistant referees: Marius Marica, Ovidiu Artene; Fourth official: Iulian Călin

17 September 2023 9	Farul Constanța	0–1	FCSB	Ovidiu
21:45 EEST (UTC+03)	Băluță (yellow card) 23'; Nedelcu (yellow card) 55'; Budescu (yellow card) 80'		Ngezana (yellow card) 12'; Olaru 56' (pen.)	Stadium: Viitorul; Attendance: 4,000; Referee: Sebastian Colțescu; Assistant referees: Radu Ghinguleac, Daniel Mitruţi; Fourth official: Bogdan Dumitrache

21 September 2023 5	Hermannstadt	2–2	FCSB	Sibiu
20:00 EEST (UTC+03)	Balaure 13'; Iancu (yellow card) 19'; Neguț (yellow card) 45'; Paraschiv 63'		Radunović (yellow card) 11'; Compagno 31' (pen.), 47'; Oct. Popescu (yellow card) 45+1'; Dawa (red card) 60'; Crețu (yellow card) 77'	Stadium: Stadionul Municipal Sibiu; Attendance: 10,500; Referee: Viorel Flueran; Assistant referees: Ferencz Tunyogi, Marius Badea; Fourth official: Andrei Moroiță

24 September 2023 10	Sepsi Sfântu Gheorghe	2–5	FCSB	Sfântu Gheorghe
21:00 EEST (UTC+03)	Francisco Júnior (yellow card) 20'; Šafranko 51'; Alimi 60'; Niňaj (yellow card) 73'		Șut 6'; Olaru 11'; Târnovanu (yellow card) 30'; Băluță (yellow card) 49'; Coman 57'; Oct. Popescu 69'; Đoković 75' (pen.)	Stadium: Sepsi Arena; Attendance: 7,000; Referee: Cătălin Popa; Assistant referees: George Neacşu, Romică Bîrdeş; Fourth official: Bogdan Dumitrache

2 October 2023 11	FCSB	2–2	Universitatea Cluj	Bucharest
21:00 EEST (UTC+03)	Dawa 8'; Șut 39'; Băluță (yellow card) 44'; Ov. Popescu (yellow card) 45+1'; Radunović (yellow card) 69'; Coman (yellow card) 90+2'		Nistor 26'; Peteleu (yellow card) 38'; Vătăjelu (yellow card) 45+2'; Masoero (yellow card) 78'; Mitrea 88'; Iliev (yellow card) 90+8'	Stadium: Arena Națională; Attendance: 13,243; Referee: Ionuţ Coza; Assistant referees: Mihai Marica, Vladimir Urzică; Fourth official: Iulian Dima

7 October 2023 12	Botoșani	0–1	FCSB	Botoșani
21:30 EEST (UTC+03)	Țigănașu (yellow card) 4'; Șeroni (yellow card) 40'; Dican (yellow card) 45+1'; Pius (yellow card) 64'		Lixandru 23'; Olaru (yellow card) 30'; Dawa (yellow card) 69'; Ov. Popescu (yellow card) 88'; Târnovanu (yellow card) 90+4'	Stadium: Municipal; Attendance: 5,500; Referee: Florin Andrei; Assistant referees: Ovidiu Artene, Mihaiță Necula; Fourth official: Sorin Vădana

22 October 2023 13	FCSB	0–0	Voluntari	Bucharest
21:00 EEST (UTC+03)	Ov. Popescu (yellow card) 49'; Pantea (yellow card) 78'			Stadium: Arena Națională; Attendance: 11,354; Referee: Marian Barbu; Assistant referees: Sebastian Gheorghe, Adrian Vornicu; Fourth official: Ovidiu Robu

28 October 2023 14	Petrolul Ploiești	2–2	FCSB	Ploiești
20:30 EEST (UTC+03)	Doua (yellow card) 52'; Papp (yellow card) 67'; Jair 70'; Grozav 90+7' (pen.)		Đoković 2'; Dawa (yellow card) 26'; Băluță 49'; Olaru (yellow card) 62'; Lixandru (yellow card) 69'; Pantea (yellow card) 90+3'	Stadium: Ilie Oană; Attendance: 13,000; Referee: Radu Petrescu; Assistant referees: Mircea Grigoriu, Mihai Marica; Fourth official: George Găman

5 November 2023 15	FCSB	1–2	Rapid București	Bucharest
20:30 EET (UTC+02)	Ov. Popescu (yellow card) 25'; Pantea (yellow card) 33'; Dawa 66'; Oct. Popescu (yellow card) 90+6'; Crețu (yellow card) 90+6'		Oaidă (yellow card) 35'; Papeau 39', (yellow card) 77'; Iacob 45+2'	Stadium: Arena Națională; Attendance: 40,563; Referee: Sebastian Colțescu; Assistant referees: SebastianGheorghe, Daniel Mitruţi; Fourth official: Marcel Bîrsan

12 November 2023 16	FCSB	2–1	U Craiova 1948	Bucharest
21:00 EET (UTC+02)	Coman 9'; Olaru 12' (pen.); Crețu (yellow card) 44', (red card) 57'; Băluță (yellow card) 90'; Ov. Popescu (yellow card) 90+3'; Radaslavescu (yellow card) 90+4'		Blănuță 65'	Stadium: Arena Națională; Attendance: 9,614; Referee: Adrian Cojocaru; Assistant referees: Imre-Laszlo Bucsi, Marius Badea; Fourth official: Lucian Rusandu

26 November 2023 17	Dinamo București	0–1	FCSB	Bucharest
20:40 EET (UTC+02)	Bena (yellow card) 51'; Patriche (yellow card) 54'		Șut (yellow card) 51'; Coman 52', (yellow card) 79'; Lixandru (yellow card) 73'; Ngezana (yellow card) 89'; Băluță (yellow card) 90+1'	Stadium: Arena Națională; Attendance: 22,926; Referee: Iulian Călin; Assistant referees: Ferencz Tunyogi, Romică Bîrdeş; Fourth official: Iulian Dima

3 December 2023 18	FCSB	0–2	Oțelul Galați	Bucharest
21:00 EET (UTC+02)	Lixandru (yellow card) 8'; Coman (yellow card) 58', (yellow card) 90+6' (yellow-red card); Đoković (yellow card) 90+1'		Teles 9', (yellow card) 61'; López (yellow card) 19'; Cisotti 64', (yellow card) 68'	Stadium: Arena Națională; Attendance: 5,723; Referee: Marcel Bîrsan; Assistant referees: Vladimir Urzică, Adrian Popescu; Fourth official: Iuliana Demetrescu

10 December 2023 19	CFR Cluj	1–1	FCSB	Cluj-Napoca
20:00 EET (UTC+02)	Tachtsidis 8'; Muhar (yellow card) 58'		Olaru 26'; Compagno (yellow card) 86'; Șut (yellow card) 86'	Stadium: Dr. Constantin Rădulescu; Attendance: 12,719; Referee: Sebastian Colțescu; Assistant referees: Radu Ghinguleac, Daniel Mitruţi; Fourth official: George Găman

16 December 2023 20	FCSB	3–0	Hermannstadt	Bucharest
20:00 EET (UTC+02)	Olaru 23', 45'; Coman 57'		Murgia (yellow card) 25'; Iancu (yellow card) 45+2'	Stadium: Arena Națională; Attendance: 7,895; Referee: Andrei Chivulete; Assistant referees: Mihai Marica, Marius Badea; Fourth official: Viorel Flueran

19 December 2023 21	Politehnica Iași	1–3	FCSB	Iași
20:30 EET (UTC+02)	Ion 26'; Buș (yellow card) 56'; Jatobá (yellow card) 65'; V. Ile (yellow card) 82'; Samayoa (yellow card) 84'		Băluță 16'; Coman 32', 84', (yellow card) 63'	Stadium: Emil Alexandrescu; Attendance: 10,121; Referee: Iulian Călin; Assistant referees: Vladimir Urzică, Ionel Dumitru; Fourth official: Ovidiu Robu

22 January 2024 22	FCSB	4–0	UTA Arad	Bucharest
20:00 EET (UTC+02)	Olaru 20', 22', 66'; Miculescu 82'		Stolnik (yellow card) 61'	Stadium: Arena Națională; Attendance: 6,053; Referee: Viorel Flueran; Assistant referees: Sebastian Gheorghe, Imre-Laszlo Bucsi; Fourth official: Andrei Moroiță

28 January 2024 23	Universitatea Craiova	0–3	FCSB	Craiova
20:00 EET (UTC+02)	Badelj (yellow card) 1'; Mitriță (yellow card) 5'; Bancu (yellow card) 82'		Olaru 45+8' (pen.), (yellow card) 71'; Coman 50'; Oct. Popescu (yellow card) 61'; Miculescu 83'	Stadium: Ion Oblemenco; Attendance: 17,766; Referee: Marcel Bîrsan; Assistant referees: Vasile Marinescu, Marius Marica; Fourth official: Ionuţ Coza

5 February 2024 24	FCSB	1–1	Farul Constanța	Bucharest
20:00 EET (UTC+02)	Alhassan (yellow card) 16', (goal) 55'; Șut (yellow card) 43'		Queirós (yellow card) 24'; Munteanu (yellow card) 76'; Grameni (yellow card) 78'; Cojocaru (yellow card) 86'; Larie 90+5' (pen.)	Stadium: Arena Națională; Attendance: 17,305; Referee: Horațiu Feșnic; Assistant referees: Sebastian Gheorghe, Daniel Mitruţi; Fourth official: Iulian Dima

11 February 2024 25	FCSB	1–0	Sepsi Sfântu Gheorghe	Bucharest
20:45 EET (UTC+02)	Băluță 16'		Oroian (yellow card) 81'	Stadium: Arena Națională; Attendance: 12,458; Referee: Adrian Cojocaru; Assistant referees: Valentin Avram, Alexandru Filip; Fourth official: Cătălin Busi

19 February 2024 26	Universitatea Cluj	0–0	FCSB	Cluj-Napoca
20:30 EET (UTC+02)	Nistor (penalty missed); Anselmo (yellow card) 20'; Rus (yellow card) 44'; Masoero (yellow card) 55'		Crețu (yellow card) 28'; Oct. Popescu (yellow card) 42'; Phelipe (yellow card) 74'	Stadium: Cluj Arena; Attendance: 23,893; Referee: Ovidiu Hațegan; Assistant referees: Sebastian Gheorghe, George Neacşu; Fourth official: Mircea Ardelean

25 February 2024 27	FCSB	3–2	Botoșani	Bucharest
20:30 EET (UTC+02)	Coman 6', 76', (yellow card) 80'; Antwi (red card) 18'; Dawa 71'; Olaru (red card) 90+1'; Radunović (yellow card) 90+6'		Filip (yellow card) 20'; Kaprof (yellow card) 30', (yellow card) 56' (yellow-red card); Sadiku (yellow card) 36'; David (yellow card) 38'; Margiotta 47'; Mouaddib (yellow card) 80'; Celea (yellow card) 80'; Ofosu 90+4'	Stadium: Arena Națională; Attendance: 11,234; Referee: Cătălin Busi; Assistant referees: Marius Badea, Marius Bobe; Fourth official: Ana Terteleac

29 February 2024 28	Voluntari	1–2	FCSB	Voluntari
21:00 EET (UTC+02)	Dumiter 16'; Rață (yellow card) 42'; Cascini (yellow card) 62'; Ricardinho (yellow card) 75'; Florea (yellow card) 90+4'		Șut (yellow card) 16'; Ngezana (yellow card) 21'; Coman 48', 54'; Miculescu (yellow card) 52'	Stadium: Stadionul Anghel Iordănescu; Attendance: 1,900; Referee: Sebastian Colțescu; Assistant referees: Valentin Dumitru, Cosmin Vatamanu; Fourth official: Alina Peşu

3 March 2024 29	FCSB	1–0	Petrolul Ploiești	Bucharest
20:30 EET (UTC+02)	Ngezana (yellow card) 45+3'; Phelipe 46'; Băluță (yellow card) 73'; Radunović (yellow card) 83'; Vlad (yellow card) 90+6'		Grozav (yellow card) 45+3'; Garutti (yellow card) 75'; Ișfan (yellow card) 83'	Stadium: Arena Națională; Attendance: 19,374; Referee: Florin Andrei; Assistant referees: Vasile Marinescu, Marius Marchidanu; Fourth official: Cristian Moldoveanu

9 March 2024 30	Rapid București	4–0	FCSB	Bucharest
20:00 EET (UTC+02)	Iacob 33'; Rrahmani 54', 82'; Krasniqi 74'		Șut (yellow card) 12'	Stadium: Arena Națională; Attendance: 43,283; Referee: Ovidiu Hațegan; Assistant referees: Mircea Grigoriu, Sebastian Gheorghe; Fourth official: Iulian Dima

==== Championship round ====
===== Table =====
Pos	Team	Pld	W	D	L	GF	GA	GD	Pts	Qualification
1	FCSB (C)	10	5	2	3	12	11	+1	49	Qualification to Champions League first qualifying round
2	CFR Cluj	10	6	1	3	19	14	+5	46	Qualification to Conference League second qualifying round
3	Universitatea Craiova (O)	10	6	1	3	18	14	+4	44	Qualification to European competition play-offs
4	Farul Constanța	10	4	2	4	19	20	−1	36	
5	Sepsi OSK	10	3	3	4	17	17	0	34	
6	Rapid București	10	1	1	8	13	22	−9	32	

Source: Soccerway, FRF (in Romanian), LPF (in Romanian)
Rules for classification: 1) Points; 2) Points without rounding; 3) Points in the regular season; 4) Head-to-head points; 5) Head-to-head goal difference; 6) Head-to-head goals scored; 7) Goal difference; 8) Goals scored; 9) Play-off (only if needed to decide champion or teams for UEFA competitions). (Note: only criteria 7 and 8 are applied to establish the classification during the competition.)
(C) Champions; (O) Play-off winners

==== Championship round results summary ====
Overall								Home						Away					
Pld	W	D	L	GF	GA	GD	Pts	W	D	L	GF	GA	GD	W	D	L	GF	GA	GD
10	5	2	3	12	11	+1	17	3	1	1	8	5	+3	2	1	2	4	6	−2

Last updated: 19 May 2024.

==== Championship round position by round ====
Round	1	2	3	4	5	6	7	8	9	10
Ground	H	A	H	A	H	A	H	A	H	A
Result	W	W	W	W	D	D	W	L	L	L
Position	1	1	1	1	1	1	1	1	1	1

Updated to match(es) played on 19 May 2024. Source:
A = Away; H = Home; W = Win; D = Draw; L = Loss

==== Matches ====
17 March 2024 1	FCSB	2–1	Sepsi OSK	Bucharest
21:00 EEST (UTC+02)	Coman 11'; Băluță 41', (yellow card) 51'		Debeljuh 25'	Stadium: Arena Națională; Attendance: 13,256; Referee: Horațiu Feșnic; Assistant referees: Alexandru Cerei, Daniel Mitruţi; Fourth official: Valentin Porumbel

31 March 2024 2	Farul Constanța	0–1	FCSB	Ovidiu
21:00 EEST (UTC+03)	Cojocaru (yellow card) 44'; Marins (yellow card) 73'; Larie (yellow card) 85'; M. Popescu (yellow card) 90'		Olaru (yellow card) 13'; Șut (yellow card) 71', (goal) 82'; Oct. Popescu (yellow card) 71'; Radunović (yellow card) 75'; Chiricheș (yellow card) 80'; Coman (yellow card) 90+2'	Stadium: Viitorul; Attendance: 4,188; Referee: Marcel Bîrsan; Assistant referees: Adrian Vornicu, Florian Vişan; Fourth official: Valentin Porumbel

7 April 2024 3	FCSB	2–0	Universitatea Craiova	Bucharest
20:30 EET (UTC+03)	Lixandru (yellow card) 6'; Miculescu (yellow card) 7'; Coman 29'; Vlădoiu 32' (o.g.)		Badelj (yellow card) 17'; Blesa (yellow card) 24'; Căpățînă (yellow card) 28'; Houri (yellow card) 49'; Bancu (yellow card) 82'	Stadium: Arena Națională; Attendance: 32,227; Referee: Ovidiu Hațegan; Assistant referees: Mircea Grigoriu, Mihai Marica; Fourth official: Andrei Moroiță

14 April 2024 4	CFR Cluj	0–1	FCSB	Cluj-Napoca
21:00 EEST (UTC+03)	Keïta (yellow card) 22'; Boben (yellow card) 65'; Abeid (red card) 90+10'		Coman 16'; Radunović (yellow card) 81'	Stadium: Dr. Constantin Rădulescu; Attendance: 15,680; Referee: Sebastian Colțescu; Assistant referees: Valentin Avram, Andrei Constantinescu; Fourth official: Szabolcs Kovács

20 April 2024 5	FCSB	2–2	Rapid București	Bucharest
20:30 EEST (UTC+03)	Olaru 10', (yellow card) 90+1'; Coman (yellow card) 42'; Băluță 57'; Crețu (yellow card) 79'; Radunović (yellow card) 90+1'		Krasniqi 12'; Rrahmani 16', (yellow card) 90+1'; Oaidă (yellow card) 20'; Hromada (yellow card) 29'; Iacob (yellow card) 37'; Bamgboye (yellow card) 82'; Braun (yellow card) 90+1'	Stadium: Arena Națională; Attendance: 45,143; Referee: Marcel Bîrsan; Assistant referees: George Neacşu, Imre-Laszlo Bucsi; Fourth official: George Găman

24 April 2024 6	Sepsi OSK	2–2	FCSB	Sfântu Gheorghe
21:45 EEST (UTC+03)	Varga 23'; Alimi (yellow card) 31'; Aganović (yellow card) 62'; Ștefan 71'		Coman 9'; Miculescu 34'; Crețu (yellow card) 86'; Radunović (yellow card) 86'	Stadium: Sepsi Arena; Attendance: 6,700; Referee: Andrei Moroiță; Assistant referees: Mircea Grigoriu, Ovidiu Artene; Fourth official: Andrei Antonie

27 April 2024 7	FCSB	2–1	Farul Constanța	Bucharest
20:30 EEST (UTC+03)	Miculescu 26'; Ngezana (yellow card) 37'; Lixandru (yellow card) 54'; Oct. Popescu (yellow card) 78'; Băluță 84', (yellow card) 84'; Olaru (yellow card) 86'		M. Popescu (yellow card) 73'; Rivaldinho 79'; Casap (yellow card) 90+3'	Stadium: Arena Națională; Attendance: 29,347; Referee: Marian Barbu; Assistant referees: Ferencz Tunyogi, Stelian Slabu; Fourth official: Cristian Moldoveanu

6 May 2024 8	Universitatea Craiova	2–0	FCSB	Craiova
21:00 EEST (UTC+03)	Silva 3', (yellow card) 45+1'; Crețu (yellow card) 62'; Ivan 71'; Mateiu (yellow card) 90+5'		Oct. Popescu (yellow card) 67'; Olaru (penalty missed); Băluță (yellow card) 81'	Stadium: Ion Oblemenco; Attendance: 18,521; Referee: Rares Vidican; Assistant referees: Mihai Marica, Imre-Laszlo Bucsi; Fourth official: Lucian Rusandu

11 May 2024 9	FCSB	0–1	CFR Cluj	Bucharest
20:00 EEST (UTC+03)	Chiricheș (yellow card) 5'		Muhar (yellow card) 35'; Otele 76'	Stadium: Arena Națională; Attendance: 54,673; Referee: Sebastian Colțescu; Assistant referees: George Neacşu, Marius Badea; Fourth official: Iulian Dima

19 May 2024 10	Rapid București	2–0	FCSB	Bucharest
21:00 EEST (UTC+03)	Bamgboye 12'; Hasani (yellow card) 29'; Petrila 43'; Oaidă (yellow card) 50'		Antwi (yellow card) 25'; Băluță (yellow card) 43'; Pădurariu (yellow card) 90+5'	Stadium: Stadionul Rapid-Giulești; Attendance: 6,133; Referee: Szabolcs Kovacs; Assistant referees: Ciprian Danşa, Doru Lucaciu; Fourth official: Iulian Călin

=== Cupa României ===
==== Group stage ====
Pos	Team	Pld	W	D	L	GF	GA	GD	Pts	Qualification	FCU	OTE	FCS	DIN	ZAL	BIH
1	FC U Craiova 1948 (Q)	3	2	1	0	4	1	+3	7	Advance to knockout phase	—	—	2–0	—	—	—
2	Oțelul Galați (Q)	3	1	2	0	8	5	+3	5	Advance to knockout phase	—	—	1–1	—	—	—
3	FCSB (E)	3	1	1	1	3	3	0	4		—	—	—	—	—	—
4	Dinamo București (E)	3	0	3	0	5	5	0	3		1–1	3–3	—	—	—	—
5	SCM Zalău (E)	3	1	0	2	3	6	−3	3		0–1	1–4	—	—	—	2–1
6	Bihor Oradea (E)	3	0	1	2	2	5	−3	1		—	—	0–2	1–1	—	—

Source: FRF
Legend: Blue = home team win; Yellow = draw; Red = away team win.
(E) Eliminated; (Q) Qualified for the phase indicated

==== Results ====
27 September 2023 GS	FC Bihor	0–2	FCSB	Oradea
21:00 EEST (UTC+03)	Stan (yellow card) 83'		Miculescu 26'; Ngezana 69'	Stadium: Iuliu Bodola; Referee: Andrei Moroiță; Assistant referees: Ionel Dumitru, Raul Ghiciulescu; Fourth official: Florin Mazilu

31 October 2023 GS	Oțelul Galați	1–1	FCSB	Galaţi
21:00 EEST (UTC+02)	Živulić (yellow card) 56'; López 90'		Ov. Popescu (yellow card) 56'; Băluță 76', (yellow card) 87'	Stadium: Oțelul; Referee: Viorel Flueran; Assistant referees: George Neacşu, Imre-Laszlo Bucsi; Fourth official: Andrei Moroiță

7 December 2023 GS	U Craiova 1948	2–0	FCSB	Craiova
20:45 EEST (UTC+02)	Bauza 40'; Van Durmen 44'; Pop (yellow card) 68'; Blănuță (yellow card) 84'; Albu (yellow card) 84'		Radaslavescu (yellow card) 7'; Ganea (yellow card) 84'; Dawa (yellow card) 89'	Stadium: Ion Oblemenco; Referee: Ovidiu Haţegan; Assistant referees: Mircea Grigoriu, Sebastian Gheorghe; Fourth official: Mircea Ardelean

=== UEFA Europa Conference League ===
==== Qualifying rounds ====
===== Second qualifying round =====
27 July 2023 First leg	CSKA 1948 (Bulgaria)	0–1	(Romania) FCSB	Sofia, Bulgaria
EEST (UTC+03)	Petrov (yellow card) 58'; Thalis (yellow card) 66'		Băluță (yellow card) 20'; Coman 28'	Stadium: Vasil Levski National Stadium; Attendance: 1,381; Referee: Luca Pairetto (Italy)

3 August 2023 Second leg	FCSB (Romania)	3–2 (4–2 agg.)	(Bulgaria) CSKA 1948	Bucharest, Romania
EEST (UTC+03)	Đoković 27', 82', (yellow card) 57'; Haruț (yellow card) 33'; Dawa (yellow card) 45+4'; Olaru (yellow card) 58'; Târnovanu (yellow card) 84'; Oct. Popescu 90+1'		Daskalov (yellow card) 15', (goal) 68'; Gurishta (yellow card) 25'; Pedrinho 49'; Viyachki (yellow card) 90+4'	Stadium: Arcul de Triumf; Attendance: 0 Referee: Juxhin Xhaja (Albania)

===== Third qualifying round =====
10 August 2023 First leg	FCSB (Romania)	0–0	(Denmark) Nordsjælland	Bucharest, Romania
21:30 EEST (UTC+03)	Coman (yellow card) 73'; Edjouma (yellow card) 88'; Chiricheș (yellow card) 90+1'		Nagalo (yellow card) 32', (yellow card) 59' (yellow-red card)	Stadium: Stadionul Steaua; Attendance: 27,135; Referee: Miloš Bošković (Montenegro)

17 August 2022 Second leg	Nordsjælland (Denmark)	2–0 (2–0 agg.)	(Romania) FCSB	Farum, Denmark
19:30 EEST (UTC+03)	Ingvartsen 43' (pen.), 85', (yellow card) 81'; Diomande (yellow card) 45+1'; Nuamah (yellow card) 45+1'		Chiricheș (yellow card) 45+1', (yellow card) 62' (yellow-red card); Đoković (yellow card) 79'	Stadium: Right to Dream Park; Attendance: 5,704; Referee: Genc Nuza (Kosovo)

== Statistics ==
=== Goalscorers ===
As of 19 May 2024

Rank	Position	Name	Liga I	Cupa României	Europa Conference League	Total
1	FW	(Romania) Florinel Coman	18	0	1	19
2	MF	(Romania) Darius Olaru	15	0	0	15
3	FW	(Romania) Alexandru Băluță	6	1	0	7
4	FW	(Romania) David Miculescu	5	1	0	6
5	FW	(Italy) Andrea Compagno	4	0	0	4
5	MF	(Croatia) Damjan Đoković	2	0	2	4
7	DF	(Cameroon) Joyskim Dawa	3	0	0	3
7	MF	(Romania) Adrian Șut	3	0	0	3
7	MF	(Romania) Octavian Popescu	2	0	1	3
10	MF	(France) Malcom Edjouma	1	0	0	1
10	MF	(Romania) Ovidiu Popescu	1	0	0	1
10	DF	(Montenegro) Risto Radunović	1	0	0	1
10	MF	(Romania) Mihai Lixandru	1	0	0	1
10	MF	(Ghana) Baba Alhassan	1	0	0	1
10	DF	(South Africa) Siyabonga Ngezana	0	1	0	1

=== Goal minutes ===
	1'–15'	16'–30'	31'–HT	46'–60'	61'–75'	76'–FT	Extra time	Forfeit
Goals	13	16	12	13	8	10	0	0
Percentage	18.06%	22.22%	16.67%	18.06%	11.11%	13.89%	0%	0%

Last updated: 19 May 2024 (UTC)
Source: FCSB (in Romanian)

=== Hat-tricks ===
Player	Against	Result	Date	Competition
(Romania) Darius Olaru	(Romania) UTA Arad	4–0 (H)	22 January 2024	Liga I

Last updated: 19 May 2024 (UTC)
Source: FCSB (in Romanian)

=== Clean sheets ===
As of 19 May 2024

Rank	Name	Liga I	Cupa României	Europa Conference League	Total	Games played
1	(Romania) Ștefan Târnovanu	15	0	2	17	43
2	(Romania) Andrei Vlad	0	1	0	1	4

=== Disciplinary record ===
As of 19 May 2024

Rank	Position	Name	Liga I			Cupa României			Europa Conference League			Total		
Rank	Position	Name	Booked	(yellow card) (yellow-red card)	Sent off (straight red)	Booked	(yellow card) (yellow-red card)	Sent off (straight red)	Booked	(yellow card) (yellow-red card)	Sent off (straight red)	Booked	(yellow card) (yellow-red card)	Sent off (straight red)
1	FW	(Romania) Alexandru Băluță	9	0	0	1	0	0	1	0	0	11	0	0
2	FW	(Romania) Florinel Coman	7	2	0	0	0	0	1	0	0	8	2	0
2	DF	(Montenegro) Risto Radunović	10	0	0	0	0	0	0	0	0	10	0	0
4	MF	(Romania) Darius Olaru	7	0	1	0	0	0	1	0	0	8	0	1
4	MF	(Romania) Octavian Popescu	9	0	0	0	0	0	0	0	0	9	0	0
6	MF	(Romania) Adrian Șut	7	0	0	0	0	0	0	0	0	7	0	0
6	MF	(Romania) Ovidiu Popescu	6	0	0	1	0	0	0	0	0	7	0	0
8	DF	(Romania) Valentin Crețu	5	0	1	0	0	0	0	0	0	5	0	1
8	DF	(Cameroon) Joyskim Dawa	3	0	1	1	0	0	1	0	0	5	0	1
10	DF	(Romania) Alexandru Pantea	4	1	0	0	0	0	0	0	0	4	1	0
10	DF	(Romania) Vlad Chiricheș	3	0	0	0	0	0	1	1	0	4	1	0
10	DF	(South Africa) Siyabonga Ngezana	5	0	0	0	0	0	0	0	0	5	0	0
10	MF	(Romania) Mihai Lixandru	5	0	0	0	0	0	0	0	0	5	0	0
14	FW	(Italy) Andrea Compagno	4	0	0	0	0	0	0	0	0	4	0	0
15	GK	(Romania) Ștefan Târnovanu	2	0	0	0	0	0	1	0	0	3	0	0
15	MF	(France) Malcom Edjouma	2	0	0	0	0	0	1	0	0	3	0	0
17	DF	(Ghana) Nana Antwi	1	0	1	0	0	0	0	0	0	1	0	1
17	FW	(Romania) David Miculescu	2	0	0	0	0	0	0	0	0	2	0	0
17	MF	(Romania) Eduard Radaslavescu	1	0	0	1	0	0	0	0	0	2	0	0
17	MF	(Croatia) Damjan Đoković	0	0	0	0	0	0	2	0	0	2	0	0
21	FW	(Romania) Andrei Cordea	1	0	0	0	0	0	0	0	0	1	0	0
21	MF	(Ghana) Baba Alhassan	1	0	0	0	0	0	0	0	0	1	0	0
21	FW	(Brazil) Luis Phelipe	1	0	0	0	0	0	0	0	0	1	0	0
21	GK	(Romania) Andrei Vlad	1	0	0	0	0	0	0	0	0	1	0	0
21	DF	(Romania) Ricardo Pădurariu	1	0	0	0	0	0	0	0	0	1	0	0
21	DF	(Romania) Cristian Ganea	0	0	0	1	0	0	0	0	0	1	0	0

=== Attendances ===
As of 19 May 2024

	Matches	Attendances	Average	High	Low
Liga I	20	398,674	19,934	54,673	5,723
Cupa României	—	―	―	―	―
Europa Conference League	2	27,135	13,568	27,135	0
Total	22	425,809	19,355	54,673	0

== See also ==
- 2023–24 Cupa României
- SuperLiga
- 2023–24 UEFA Europa Conference League
