= 2025–26 FCSB season =

FCSB
2025–26 season
- Owner: Gigi Becali
- President: Valeriu Argăseală
- Manager: Elias Charalambous (until 7 March 2026); Mirel Rădoi (until 21 April 2026); Lucian Filip (until 18 May 2026); Marius Baciu (from 19 May 2026)
- Stadium: Arena Națională
- Superliga: 8th
- Superliga European play-offs: Winners
- Cupa României: Group stage
- Supercupa României: Winners
- UEFA Champions League: Second qualifying round
- UEFA Europa League: League Phase (27th)
- Top goalscorer: League: Florin Tănase (15); All: Florin Tănase (17)
Home colours	Away colours	Third colours

The 2025–26 season was the 78th season in the history of FCSB, and the club's 78th consecutive season in Superliga. In addition to the domestic league, the club participated in the Cupa României and the UEFA Europa League, having dropped down from the UEFA Champions League at the second qualifying round.

== Season overview ==
=== Current squad ===
As of 18 May 2026

Note: Flags indicate national team as defined under FIFA eligibility rules; some limited exceptions apply. Players may hold more than one non-FIFA nationality.

No.	Pos.	Nation	Player
1	GK	ROU	Rareș Andrei
2	DF	ROU	Valentin Crețu
3	DF	POR	André Duarte
4	DF	BIH	Daniel Graovac
5	DF	CMR	Joyskim Dawa
6	DF	ROU	Andrei Dăncuș
9	FW	ROU	Daniel Bîrligea
10	FW	ROU	Florin Tănase (vice-captain)
11	FW	ROU	David Miculescu
12	DF	BEN	David Kiki
13	GK	ROU	Matei Popa
14	MF	ROU	Denis Colibășanu
15	MF	ISR	Ofri Arad
16	MF	ROU	Mihai Lixandru
17	DF	ROU	Mihai Popescu
18	MF	CPV	João Paulo
20	FW	ROU	Luca Ilie
21	DF	ROU	Vlad Chiricheș (4th captain)

No.	Pos.	Nation	Player
22	MF	ROU	Mihai Toma
23	DF	ROU	Ionuț Cercel
27	MF	ROU	Darius Olaru (captain)
28	DF	ROU	Alexandru Pantea
29	MF	ROU	Andrei Panait
30	DF	RSA	Siyabonga Ngezana
31	MF	ITA	Juri Cisotti
32	GK	ROU	Ștefan Târnovanu
33	DF	MNE	Risto Radunović (3rd captain)
34	GK	ROU	Mihai Udrea
37	MF	ROU	Octavian Popescu
38	GK	CZE	Lukáš Zima
42	MF	UGA	Baba Alhassan
77	FW	ROU	David Avram
90	FW	ROU	Alexandru Stoian
93	FW	SEN	Mamadou Thiam
98	MF	ROU	David Popa

== Transfers ==
=== In ===
Pos.	Player	Transferred from	Fee	Date	Source
MF	(Romania) Ovidiu Perianu	(Romania) Unirea Slobozia	Loan return	30 June 2025	
MF	(Romania) Laurențiu Vlăsceanu	(Romania) Unirea Slobozia	Loan return	30 June 2025	
GK	(Romania) Alexandru Maxim	(Romania) Olimpia Satu Mare	Loan return	30 June 2025	
DF	(Romania) Ricardo Pădurariu	(Romania) Gloria Bistrița	Loan return	30 June 2025	
DF	(Bosnia and Herzegovina) Daniel Graovac	(Romania) CFR Cluj	Free agent	30 June 2025	
FW	(Romania) Denis Alibec	(Romania) Farul Constanța	Free agent	30 June 2025	
FW	(Romania) Dennis Politic	(Romania) Dinamo București	€700,000 & (Romania) Alexandru Musi	30 June 2025	
FW	(Romania) Andrei Gheorghiță	(Romania) Politehnica Iași	Free	13 August 2025	
FW	(Senegal) Mamadou Thiam	(Romania) Universitatea Cluj	€50,000 & (Romania) Andrei Gheorghiță	20 August 2025	
DF	(Portugal) André Duarte	(Hungary) Újpest	Free agent	1 December 2025	
MF	(Israel) Ofri Arad	(Kazakhstan) Kairat	Free agent	20 January 2026	
MF	(Cape Verde) João Paulo	(Romania) Oțelul Galați	€350,000	3 February 2026	

=== Out ===
Pos.	Player	Transferred to	Fee	Date	Source
MF	(Belgium) William Baeten	(Albania) Flamurtari	End of contract	30 June 2025	
MF	(Romania) Alexandru Musi	(Romania) Dinamo București	(Romania) Dennis Politic	30 June 2025	
GK	(Romania) Alexandru Maxim	(Romania) Voluntari	Loan	30 June 2025	
DF	(Romania) Ricardo Pădurariu	(Romania) Corvinul Hunedoara	Loan	4 July 2025	
FW	(Romania) Marius Ștefănescu	(Turkey) Konyaspor	€300,000	30 July 2025	
MF	(Romania) Laurențiu Vlăsceanu	(Romania) UTA Arad	Loan	4 August 2025	
MF	(Romania) Ovidiu Perianu	(Romania) CFR Cluj	Mutual agreement	5 August 2025	
FW	(Romania) Alexandru Băluță	(United States) Los Angeles FC	Mutual agreement	8 August 2025	
FW	(Romania) Andrei Gheorghiță	(Romania) Universitatea Cluj	Loan	14 August 2025	
FW	(France) Jordan Gele	(Qatar) Al Kharaitiyat	Free	15 August 2025	
FW	(Romania) Andrei Gheorghiță	(Romania) Universitatea Cluj	(Senegal) Mamadou Thiam	20 August 2025	
MF	(France) Malcom Edjouma	(China) Qingdao Hainiu	End of contract	1 January 2026	
MF	(Romania) Laurențiu Vlăsceanu	(Romania) Unirea Slobozia	Loan	4 January 2026	
FW	(Romania) Robert Necșulescu	(Romania) Chindia Târgoviște	Loan	4 January 2026	
DF	(Romania) Matei Manolache	(Romania) Gloria Bistrița	Loan	9 January 2026	
MF	(Romania) Adrian Șut	(United Arab Emirates) Al Ain	€1,500,000	10 January 2026	
FW	(Romania) Denis Alibec	(Romania) Farul Constanța	Free	30 January 2026	
FW	(Romania) Dennis Politic	(Romania) Hermannstadt	Loan	5 February 2026	
DF	(Ghana) Nana Antwi	(Israel) Beitar Jerusalem	€200,000	10 February 2026	

== Friendlies ==
=== Pre-season ===
28 June 2025 Friendly	Almere City (Netherlands)	2–3	(Romania) FCSB	Almere, Netherlands
14:00 UTC+3	Rijkhoff 13', 41'	Report	Alibec 40'; Gheorghiță 51'; Tănase 78'	Stadium: Yanmar Stadion

1 July 2025 Friendly	Utrecht (Netherlands)	1–3	(Romania) FCSB	Zeist, Netherlands
12:00 UTC+3	Min 66'		Cisotti 9'; Politic 76'; Perianu 77'	Stadium: KNVB Campus

=== Mid-season ===
9 January 2026 Friendly	Beşiktaş (Turkey)	2–1	(Romania) FCSB	Antalya, Turkey
16:00 UTC+2	Bircan 70'; J. Silva 75'	Report	Thiam 68'	Stadium: Gloria Sports Arena

== Competitions ==
=== Overall record ===
Competition	First match	Last match	Starting round	Final position	Record							
Competition	First match	Last match	Starting round	Final position	Pld	W	D	L	GF	GA	GD	Win %
Superliga	16 July 2025	18 May 2026	Matchday 1	8th	39	17	9	13	61	49	+12	43.59
Superliga European play-offs	24 May 2026	29 May 2026	Semi-final	Winners	2	2	0	0	6	4	+2	100.00
Cupa României	29 October 2025	12 February 2026	Group stage	Group stage (3rd)	3	1	1	1	5	6	−1	33.33
Supercupa României	5 July 2025		Final	Winners	1	1	0	0	2	1	+1	100.00
UEFA Champions League	9 July 2025	30 July 2025	First qualifying round	Second qualifying round	4	1	0	3	5	6	−1	25.00
UEFA Europa League	7 August 2025	29 January 2026	Third qualifying round	League Phase (27th)	12	5	2	5	20	21	−1	41.67
Total					61	27	12	22	99	87	+12	44.26

Last updated: 29 May 2026
Source: Soccerway

=== Superliga ===
==== Regular season ====
Pos	Team	Pld	W	D	L	GF	GA	GD	Pts	Qualification
5	Dinamo București	30	14	10	6	42	28	+14	52	Advances to Play-off
6	Argeș Pitești	30	15	5	10	37	28	+9	50	Advances to Play-off
7	FCSB	30	13	7	10	48	40	+8	46	Advances to Play-out
8	UTA Arad	30	11	10	9	39	44	−5	43	Advances to Play-out
9	Botoșani	30	11	9	10	37	29	+8	42	Advances to Play-out

Source: LPF (in Romanian)
Rules for classification: 1) Points; 2) Head-to-head points; 3) Head-to-head goal difference; 4) Head-to-head goals scored; 5) Goal difference; 6) Goals scored; 7) Play-off.

==== Results summary ====
Overall								Home						Away					
Pld	W	D	L	GF	GA	GD	Pts	W	D	L	GF	GA	GD	W	D	L	GF	GA	GD
30	13	7	10	48	40	+8	46	7	3	5	20	17	+3	6	4	5	28	23	+5

==== Results by round ====
Round	1	2	3	4	5	6	7	8	9	10	11	12	13	14	15	16	17	18	19	20	21	22	23	24	25	26	27	28	29	30
Ground	H	A	H	A	H	A	H	A	A	A	H	H	A	H	A	A	H	A	H	A	H	A	H	H	H	A	A	H	A	H
Result	D	W	L	L	L	D	L	D	D	L	W	W	L	W	W	D	D	W	D	W	W	L	L	W	W	W	L	W	W	L
Position	11	6	9	12	12	13	13	13	11	13	11	11	12	10	8	9	10	9	10	9	9	9	11	11	10	8	10	7	7	7

A = Away; H = Home; W = Win; D = Draw; L = Loss

==== Results ====
12 July 2025 1	FCSB	1–1	Hermannstadt	Bucharest
21:30 UTC+3	Stoian 90+3'	Report	Selimović (yellow card) 24'; Kujabi 75'	Stadium: Steaua Stadium; Attendance: 6,029; Referee: Viorel Flueran

19 July 2025 2	Petrolul Ploiești	0–1	FCSB	Ploiești
21:30 UTC+3	Boțogan (yellow card) 50'; Prce (yellow card) 75'; Keita (yellow card) 82'	Report	Stoian (yellow card) 45+1'; Tănase 75'; Miculescu (yellow card) 83'; Cercel (yellow card) 84'; M. Popescu (yellow card) 90+3'	Stadium: Ilie Oană Stadium; Referee: Sebastian Colțescu

26 July 2025 3	FCSB	1–2	Farul Constanța	Bucharest
21:30 UTC+3	Miculescu 2'; Lixandru (yellow card) 5'; Alhassan (yellow card) 50'; M. Popescu (yellow card) 68'; Târnovanu (yellow card) 68', (red card) 68'; Șut (yellow card) 82'	Report	Larie 59' (pen.); Ramalho (yellow card) 90+6'; Ișfan 90+10'	Stadium: Steaua Stadium; Attendance: 7,514; Referee: George Găman

2 August 2025 4	Dinamo București	4–3	FCSB	Bucharest
21:30 UTC+3	Musi 34'; Armstrong 45+4' (pen.), 57' (pen.), 79'; Boateng (yellow card) 90'	Report	Tănase 19' (pen.), 50', 90+1' (pen.); Radunović (yellow card) 45+2'; Miculescu (yellow card) 48'; Ngezana (yellow card) 85'	Stadium: Arena Națională; Attendance: 23,215; Referee: Horațiu Feșnic

10 August 2025 5	FCSB	0–1	Unirea Slobozia	Bucharest
21:30 UTC+3	Tănase (yellow card) 76'; Kiki (yellow card) 90+3'	Report	Rotund 34'; Rusu (yellow card) 74'; Said (yellow card) 79'	Stadium: Steaua Stadium; Attendance: 6,083; Referee: Adrian Cojocaru

17 August 2025 6	Rapid București	2–2	FCSB	Bucharest
21:30 UTC+3	Koljić 83', 90+2'; Pașcanu (yellow card) 86'	Report	Lixandru 7', (yellow card) 77'; Bîrligea 61'; M. Popescu (yellow card) 71'; Pantea (yellow card) 85'	Stadium: Arena Națională; Attendance: 26,871; Referee: István Kovács

24 August 2025 7	FCSB	0–2	FC Argeș	Bucharest
21:30 UTC+3		Report	Bettaieb 72'; M. Popescu 88' (o.g.)	Stadium: Arena Națională; Attendance: 8,715; Referee: Marcel Bîrsan

31 August 2025 8	CFR Cluj	2–2	FCSB	Cluj-Napoca
21:30 UTC+3	Đoković 19'; Emërllahu 45+1'	Report	Tănase 43' (pen.); Cisotti 87'	Stadium: Dr. Constantin Rădulescu Stadium; Referee: Sebastian Colțescu

14 September 2025 9	Csíkszereda	1–1	FCSB	Miercurea Ciuc
21:00 UTC+3	Pantea 81' (o.g.)	Report	Edjouma 55'	Stadium: Miercurea Ciuc Municipal Stadium; Attendance: 2,190; Referee: Iulian Călin

19 September 2025 10	Botoșani	3–1	FCSB	Botoșani
20:30 UTC+3	Dumiter 40'; Kovtalyuk 68', 90+2'	Report	Bîrligea 36'	Stadium: Botoșani Municipal Stadium; Attendance: 6,972; Referee: Rareș Vidican

28 September 2025 11	FCSB	1–0	Oțelul Galați	Bucharest
20:30 UTC+3	Tănase 48' (pen.)	Report		Stadium: Arena Națională; Attendance: 5,130; Referee: Ionuț Coza

5 October 2025 12	FCSB	1–0	Universitatea Craiova	Bucharest
20:30 UTC+3	Tănase 39' (pen.)	Report		Stadium: Arena Națională; Attendance: 11,403; Referee: István Kovács

18 October 2025 13	Metaloglobus București	2–1	FCSB	Clinceni
20:30 UTC+3	Ubbink 48'; Huiban 55' (pen.)	Report	Tănase 34' (pen.)	Stadium: Clinceni Stadium; Attendance: 1,630; Referee: Robert Avram

26 October 2025 14	FCSB	4–0	UTA Arad	Bucharest
20:30 UTC+2	Bîrligea 13'; Tănase 38' (pen.); Olaru 80' (pen.); Thiam 90+3'	Report		Stadium: Arena Națională; Attendance: 5,187; Referee: Andrei Moroiță

1 November 2025 15	Universitatea Cluj	0–2	FCSB	Cluj-Napoca
20:30 UTC+2		Report	Olaru 32', 55'	Stadium: Cluj Arena; Attendance: 14,691; Referee: Adrian Cojocaru

9 November 2025 16	Hermannstadt	3–3	FCSB	Sibiu
20:30 UTC+2	Chițu 26', 54'; Stancu 87'	Report	Thiam 4'; Miculescu 63'; Politic 90+3'	Stadium: Sibiu Municipal Stadium; Attendance: 8,351; Referee: Radu Petrescu

22 November 2025 17	FCSB	1–1	Petrolul Ploiești	Bucharest
20:30 UTC+2	Stoian 11'	Report	Sălceanu 47'	Stadium: Arena Națională; Attendance: 8,105; Referee: Szabolcs Kovács

30 November 2025 18	Farul Constanța	1–2	FCSB	Ovidiu
20:30 UTC+2	Larie 37' (pen.)	Report	Șut 14'; Miculescu 24'	Stadium: Central Stadium; Attendance: 4,038; Referee: Rareș Vidican

6 December 2025 19	FCSB	0–0	Dinamo București	Bucharest
20:30 UTC+2		Report		Stadium: Arena Națională; Attendance: 28,510; Referee: Marian Barbu

15 December 2025 20	Unirea Slobozia	0–2	FCSB	Clinceni
20:30 UTC+2		Report	Lixandru 62'; Stoian 90+5'	Stadium: Clinceni Stadium; Attendance: 1,387; Referee: Vlad Baban

20 December 2025 21	FCSB	2–1	Rapid București	Bucharest
20:00 UTC+2	Olaru 24'; Tănase 75' (pen.)	Report	Dobre 86' (pen.)	Stadium: Arena Națională; Attendance: 30,903; Referee: István Kovács

16 January 2026 22	FC Argeș	1–0	FCSB	Mioveni
20:00 UTC+2	Pîrvu 28'	Report		Stadium: Orășenesc Stadium; Attendance: 3,972; Referee: Marcel Bîrsan

25 January 2026 23	FCSB	1–4	CFR Cluj	Bucharest
20:00 UTC+2	Miculescu 2'	Report	Aliev 41'; Korenica 44'; Cordea 49'; Biliboc 90+1'	Stadium: Arena Națională; Attendance: 55,634; Referee: Marian Barbu

1 February 2026 24	FCSB	1–0	Csíkszereda	Bucharest
20:00 UTC+2	Cisotti 38'	Report		Stadium: Arena Națională; Attendance: 2,642; Referee: Cristian Moldoveanu

5 February 2026 25	FCSB	2–1	Botoșani	Bucharest
20:30 UTC+2	Thiam 42'; Olaru 74'	Report	Kovtalyuk 72'	Stadium: Arena Națională; Attendance: 3,344; Referee: Iulian Călin

8 February 2026 26	Oțelul Galați	1–4	FCSB	Galați
20:00 UTC+2	Zhelev 25'	Report	Bîrligea 31', 43'; Olaru 66'; Tănase 79'	Stadium: Oțelul Stadium; Attendance: 9,140; Referee: Marcel Bîrsan

15 February 2026 27	Universitatea Craiova	1–0	FCSB	Craiova
20:00 UTC+2	Al Hamlawi 23'	Report		Stadium: Ion Oblemenco Stadium; Attendance: 25,026; Referee: Marian Barbu

23 February 2026 28	FCSB	4–1	Metaloglobus București	Bucharest
20:00 UTC+2	Bîrligea 6'; Olaru 26'; Miculescu 51'; Cisotti 79'	Report	Huiban 7'	Stadium: Arena Națională; Attendance: 2,456; Referee: Iuliana Demetrescu

1 March 2026 29	UTA Arad	2–4	FCSB	Arad
21:00 UTC+2	Abdallah 17'; Alomerovikj 87'	Report	Lixandru 11', 33'; Cisotti 25'; Bîrligea 62'	Stadium: Francisc von Neuman Stadium; Attendance: 10,347; Referee: Sebastian Colțescu

7 March 2026 30	FCSB	1–3	Universitatea Cluj	Bucharest
20:00 UTC+2	Stanojev 10' (o.g.)	Report	Mendy 24'; Lukić 40'; Macalou 57'	Stadium: Arena Națională; Attendance: 5,024; Referee: Rareș Vidican

==== Relegation round ====
===== Table =====
Pos	Team	Pld	W	D	L	GF	GA	GD	Pts	Qualification or relegation
7	UTA Arad (Note: UTA Arad and Oțelul Galați were ineligible to qualify for the European competition play-offs because they did not obtain a UEFA license.)	9	5	2	2	14	7	+7	39	
8	FCSB (O)	9	4	2	3	13	9	+4	37	Qualification to European competition play-offs
9	Oțelul Galați	9	4	2	3	17	15	+2	35	
10	Botoșani	9	3	3	3	13	17	−4	33 (Note: Botoșani is ahead of Csíkszereda Miercurea Ciuc on points from the regular season.)	Qualification to European competition play-offs

Source: LPF (in Romanian)
Rules for classification: 1) Points; 2) Points without rounding; 3) Points in the regular season; 4) Head-to-head points; 5) Head-to-head goal difference; 6) Head-to-head goals scored; 7) Goal difference; 8) Goals scored; 9) Play-off (only if needed to decide champion or teams for UEFA competitions). (Note: only criteria 7 and 8 are applied to establish the classification during the competition.
(O) Play-off winners

==== Relegation round results summary ====
Overall								Home						Away					
Pld	W	D	L	GF	GA	GD	Pts	W	D	L	GF	GA	GD	W	D	L	GF	GA	GD
9	4	2	3	13	9	+4	14	3	2	0	8	1	+7	1	0	3	5	8	−3

Last updated: 18 May 2026.

==== Relegation round position by round ====
Round	1	2	3	4	5	6	7	8	9
Ground	H	H	A	H	A	H	A	H	A
Result	D	W	L	W	W	W	L	D	L
Position	9	7	8	8	7	7	7	7	8

Updated to match(es) played on 18 May 2026. Source:
A = Away; H = Home; W = Win; D = Draw; L = Loss

==== Matches ====
15 March 2026 1	FCSB	0–0	Metaloglobus București	Bucharest
20:30 UTC+2		Report		Stadium: Arena Națională; Attendance: 7,543; Referee: Viorel Flueran

20 March 2026 2	FCSB	1–0	UTA Arad	Bucharest
19:00 UTC+2	Miculescu 57'	Report		Stadium: Arena Națională; Attendance: 5,211; Referee: Marian Barbu

3 April 2026 3	Botoșani	3–2	FCSB	Botoșani
20:30 UTC+3	Ongenda 35', 68'; Mailat 78'	Report	Olaru 4'; Tănase 42' (pen.)	Stadium: Botoșani Municipal Stadium; Attendance: 5,174; Referee: Cătălin Găman

11 April 2026 4	FCSB	4–0	Oțelul Galați	Bucharest
20:00 UTC+3	Tănase 13' (pen.); M. Popescu 20'; Olaru 22'; Stoian 44'	Report		Stadium: Arena Națională; Attendance: 4,039; Referee: Gabriel Mihuleac

20 April 2026 5	Farul Constanța	2–3	FCSB	Ovidiu
20:30 UTC+3	Radaslavescu 43'; Alibec 72'	Report	João Paulo 56'; Cisotti 62'; Tănase 64'	Stadium: Central Stadium; Attendance: 4,128; Referee: Viorel Flueran

24 April 2026 6	FCSB	3–1	Petrolul Ploiești	Bucharest
20:30 UTC+3	Tănase 16' (pen.); O. Popescu 27'; Olaru 56'	Report	Aymbetov 90'	Stadium: Arena Națională; Attendance: 6,363; Referee: George Găman

1 May 2026 7	Csíkszereda	1–0	FCSB	Miercurea Ciuc
20:30 UTC+3	Csürös 87'	Report		Stadium: Miercurea Ciuc Municipal Stadium; Attendance: 1,713; Referee: Rareș Vidican

11 May 2026 8	FCSB	0–0	Unirea Slobozia	Bucharest
21:00 UTC+3		Report		Stadium: Steaua Stadium; Attendance: 4,503; Referee: George Roman

18 May 2026 9	Hermannstadt	2–0	FCSB	Sibiu
20:30 UTC+3	Chorbadzhiyski 38'; Buș 70'	Report		Stadium: Sibiu Municipal Stadium; Attendance: 6,558; Referee: Ionuț Coza

=== Superliga European play-offs ===
24 May 2026 Semi-final	FCSB	4–3 (a.e.t.)	Botoșani	Bucharest
20:30 UTC+3	João Paulo 20'; Dawa 53'; Tănase 69' (pen.); O. Popescu 107'	Report	Mailat 14', 77' (pen.); Kovtalyuk 90+4'	Stadium: Steaua Stadium; Attendance: 10,341; Referee: István Kovács

29 May 2026 Final	Dinamo București	1–2 (a.e.t.)	FCSB	Bucharest
20:30 UTC+3	Karamoko 73'	Report	Dawa 10'; Arad 107'	Stadium: Arcul de Triumf Stadium; Attendance: 6,778; Referee: Marian Barbu

=== Cupa României ===
==== Group stage ====
Pos	Team	Pld	W	D	L	GF	GA	GD	Pts	Qualification	UCV	GLO	UTA	FCS	PET	SAN
1	Universitatea Craiova	3	2	1	0	10	3	+7	7	Advance to knockout phase	—	—	—	2–2	—	—
2	Gloria Bistrița	3	2	0	1	4	4	0	6	Advance to knockout phase	—	—	1–0	1–3	—	—
3	UTA Arad	3	1	1	1	4	2	+2	4		—	—	—	3–0	1–1	—
4	FCSB	3	1	1	1	5	6	−1	4		—	—	—	—	—	—
5	Petrolul Ploiești	3	1	1	1	4	6	−2	4		0–4	—	—	—	—	—
6	Sănătatea Cluj	3	0	0	3	3	9	−6	0		1–4	1–2	—	—	1–3	—

Source: Flashscore
Legend: Blue = home team win; Yellow = draw; Red = away team win.

==== Results ====
29 October 2025 1	Gloria Bistrița	1–3	FCSB	Bistrița
21:00 UTC+2	Mensah 79' (pen.)	Report	Alibec 26' (pen.); Thiam 45'; Stoian 90'	Stadium: Jean Pădureanu Stadium; Referee: Mihail Lăstun

3 December 2025 2	UTA Arad	3–0	FCSB	Arad
21:00 UTC+2	Costache 54'; Coman 60'; Alomerović 90+4'	Report		Stadium: Francisc von Neuman Stadium; Attendance: 4,211; Referee: Cătălin Roman

12 February 2026 3	Universitatea Craiova	2–2	FCSB	Craiova
20:30 UTC+2	Rus 9'; Ștefan 54'	Report	Bîrligea 16'; D. Popa 65'	Stadium: Ion Oblemenco Stadium; Attendance: 13,154; Referee: Horațiu Feșnic

=== Supercupa României ===
5 July 2025 Final	FCSB	2–1	CFR Cluj	Bucharest
20:00 UTC+3	Politic 49'; Radunović 90+1'	Report	Sfait (yellow card) 36'; Abeid (yellow card) 62'; Fică 65'; Camora (yellow card) 88'	Stadium: Steaua Stadium; Attendance: 20,133; Referee: Marian Barbu

=== UEFA Champions League ===
==== Qualifying phase ====
Win Draw Loss Fixtures

==== First qualifying round ====
9 July 2025 First leg	FCSB (Romania)	3–1	(Andorra) Inter Club d'Escaldes	Bucharest
20:30 UTC+3	Politic (yellow card) 30'; Miculescu 37'; Olaru 45+3' (pen.); Ștefănescu 53', (yellow card) 78'; Gheorghiță (yellow card) 80'	Report	Díaz (yellow card) 45+2'; Rafinha 65'	Stadium: Steaua Stadium; Attendance: 13,080; Referee: Danilo Nikolić (Serbia)

15 July 2025 Second leg	Inter Club d'Escaldes (Andorra)	2–1 (3–4 agg.)	(Romania) FCSB	Encamp, Andorra
21:30 UTC+3	Sascha 67'; Muñoz (yellow card) 81'; Llovet 88'	Report	Ngezana (yellow card) 29'; Radunović 51'; M. Popescu (yellow card) 66'	Stadium: Estadi de la FAF; Attendance: 509; Referee: Ishmael Barbara (Malta)

==== Second qualifying round ====
22 July 2025 First leg	Shkëndija (North Macedonia)	1–0	(Romania) FCSB	Skopje, North Macedonia
21:00 UTC+3	Krstevski (yellow card) 42'; Alhassan 65'; Qaka (red card) 70'	Report	Ngezana (yellow card) 18'; Tănase (red card) 79'	Stadium: Toše Proeski Arena; Attendance: 4,438; Referee: Nathan Verboomen (Belgium)

30 July 2025 Second leg	FCSB (Romania)	1–2 (1–3 agg.)	(North Macedonia) Shkëndija	Bucharest
20:30 UTC+3	Cisotti 28'; Ngezana (yellow card) 62'; Chiricheș (yellow card) 77'	Report	Webster (yellow card) 21'; Latifi 33'; Fetai (yellow card) 81'; Tamba (yellow card) 87'; Krstevski 87'	Stadium: Arena Națională; Attendance: 32,457; Referee: Oleksiy Derevinskyi (Ukraine)

=== UEFA Europa League ===
==== Qualifying phase ====
Win Draw Loss Fixtures

==== Third qualifying round ====
7 August 2025 First leg	FCSB (Romania)	3–2	(Kosovo) Drita	Bucharest
21:30 UTC+3	Bîrligea 64', 90+4' (pen.); Graovac 72'; Șut (yellow card) 72'	Report	Tusha 7'; Manaj 50'; Maloku (yellow card) 72'; Dabiqaj (yellow card) 83'; Krasniqi (yellow card) 90+6'	Stadium: Arena Națională; Attendance: 13,825; Referee: Damian Sylwestrzak (Poland)

14 August 2025 Second leg	Drita (Kosovo)	1–3 (3–6 agg.)	(Romania) FCSB	Pristina, Kosovo
21:00 UTC+3	Tusha 52'; Bejtullai (yellow card) 56'; Broja (red card) 68'; Morina (yellow card) 82'	Report	Cisotti 1', (yellow card) 83'; Miculescu 18'; Șut (yellow card) 53'; Politic 85'	Stadium: Fadil Vokrri Stadium; Attendance: 6,530; Referee: Giorgi Kruashvili (Georgia)

==== Play-off round ====
21 August 2025 First leg	(Scotland) Aberdeen	2–2	(Romania) FCSB	Aberdeen, Scotland
21:45 UTC+3	Polvara 61'; Sokler 89'	Report	Bîrligea 32'; Cisotti (red card) 38'; Olaru 48'	Stadium: Pittodrie Stadium; Attendance: 17,751; Referee: Serdar Gözübüyük (Netherlands)

28 August 2025 Second leg	(Romania) FCSB	3–0 (5–2 agg.)	(Scotland) Aberdeen	Bucharest
21:30 UTC+3	Olaru 45+1' (pen.), 59'; Șut 52'	Report		Stadium: Arena Națională; Attendance: 35,341; Referee: Espen Eskås (Norway)

==== League phase ====
Pos	Team	Pld	W	D	L	GF	GA	GD	Pts
25	(Swiss Football Association) Young Boys	8	3	0	5	10	16	−6	9
26	(Austrian Football Association) Sturm Graz	8	2	1	5	5	11	−6	7
27	(Romanian Football Federation) FCSB	8	2	1	5	9	16	−7	7
28	(Royal Dutch Football Association) Go Ahead Eagles	8	2	1	5	6	14	−8	7
29	(Royal Dutch Football Association) Feyenoord	8	2	0	6	11	15	−4	6

Source: UEFA
Rules for classification: League phase tiebreakers

Round	1	2	3	4	5	6	7	8
Ground	A	H	H	A	A	H	A	H
Result	W	L	L	L	L	W	L	D
Position	9	24	28	31	31	27	29	27

Source: UEFA
A = Away; H = Home; W = Win; D = Draw; L = Loss

==== Results ====
25 September 2025 1	Go Ahead Eagles (Netherlands)	0–1	(Romania) FCSB	Deventer, Netherlands
19:45 UTC+3		Report	Miculescu 13'	Stadium: De Adelaarshorst; Attendance: 9,578; Referee: Kristo Tohver (Estonia)

2 October 2025 2	FCSB (Romania)	0–2	(Switzerland) Young Boys	Bucharest
19:45 UTC+3		Report	Monteiro 11', 36'	Stadium: Arena Națională; Attendance: 25,056; Referee: Mohammed Al-Hakim (Sweden)

23 October 2025 3	FCSB (Romania)	1–2	(Italy) Bologna	Bucharest
19:45 UTC+3	Bîrligea 54'	Report	Odgaard 9'; Dallinga 12'	Stadium: Arena Națională; Attendance: 27,643; Referee: Andris Treimanis (Latvia)

6 November 2025 4	Basel (Switzerland)	3–1	(Romania) FCSB	Basel, Switzerland
19:45 UTC+2	Shaqiri 19' (pen.), 73'; Salah 88'	Report	Olaru 57'	Stadium: St. Jakob-Park; Attendance: 21,925; Referee: Juxhin Xhaja (Albania)

27 November 2025 5	Red Star Belgrade (Serbia)	1–0	(Romania) FCSB	Belgrade, Serbia
22:00 UTC+2	Duarte 50'	Report		Stadium: Rajko Mitić Stadium; Attendance: 26,054; Referee: Jérôme Brisard (France)

11 December 2025 6	FCSB (Romania)	4–3	(Netherlands) Feyenoord	Bucharest
22:00 UTC+2	Ngezana 11'; Lixandru (yellow card) 48'; Toma 54'; Thiam 86'; Tănase (yellow card) 73', (goal) 90+5'	Report	Tengstedt 41'; Timber 44'; Sauer 51'; Ahmedhodžić (yellow card) 72'	Stadium: Arena Națională; Attendance: 22,857; Referee: Mykola Balakin (Ukraine)

22 January 2026 7	Dinamo Zagreb (Croatia)	4–1	(Romania) FCSB	Zagreb, Croatia
22:00 UTC+3	Bakrar 7'; Beljo 11', 71'; Kulenović 90+3'	Report	Bîrligea 42'	Stadium: Stadion Maksimir; Attendance: 9,040; Referee: Sander van der Eijk (Netherlands)

29 January 2026 8	FCSB (Romania)	1–1	(Turkey) Fenerbahçe	Bucharest
22:00 UTC+3	Cisotti 71'	Report	Yüksek 19'	Stadium: Arena Națională; Attendance: 27,751; Referee: Nenad Minaković (Serbia)

== Statistics ==
=== Goalscorers ===
As of 29 May 2026

Rank	Position	Name	Superliga	Superliga European play-offs	Cupa României	Champions League	Europa League	Supercupa României	Total
1	FW	(Romania) Florin Tănase	15	1	0	0	1	0	17
2	MF	(Romania) Darius Olaru	10	0	0	1	4	0	15
3	FW	(Romania) Daniel Bîrligea	7	0	1	0	5	0	13
4	FW	(Romania) David Miculescu	6	0	0	1	2	0	9
5	MF	(Italy) Juri Cisotti	5	0	0	1	2	0	8
6	FW	(Senegal) Mamadou Thiam	3	0	1	0	1	0	5
6	FW	(Romania) Alexandru Stoian	4	0	1	0	0	0	5
8	MF	(Romania) Mihai Lixandru	4	0	0	0	0	0	4
9	FW	(Romania) Dennis Politic	1	0	0	0	1	1	3
10	DF	(Montenegro) Risto Radunović	0	0	0	1	0	1	2
10	MF	(Romania) Adrian Șut	1	0	0	0	1	0	2
10	MF	(Cape Verde) João Paulo	1	1	0	0	0	0	2
10	MF	(Romania) Octavian Popescu	1	1	0	0	0	0	2
10	DF	(Cameroon) Joyskim Dawa	0	2	0	0	0	0	2
15	FW	(Romania) Marius Ștefănescu	0	0	0	1	0	0	1
15	DF	(Bosnia and Herzegovina) Daniel Graovac	0	0	0	0	1	0	1
15	MF	(France) Malcom Edjouma	1	0	0	0	0	0	1
15	FW	(Romania) Denis Alibec	0	0	1	0	0	0	1
15	DF	(South Africa) Siyabonga Ngezana	0	0	0	0	1	0	1
15	MF	(Romania) Mihai Toma	0	0	0	0	1	0	1
15	MF	(Romania) David Popa	0	0	1	0	0	0	1
15	DF	(Romania) Mihai Popescu	1	0	0	0	0	0	1
15	MF	(Israel) Ofri Arad	0	1	0	0	0	0	1
Own goal			1	0	0	0	0	0	1

=== Clean sheets ===
As of 29 May 2026

Rank	Name	Superliga	Superliga European play-offs	Cupa României	Champions League	Europa League	Supercupa României	Total	Games played
1	(Romania) Ștefan Târnovanu	9	0	0	0	3	0	12	42
2	(Romania) Matei Popa	4	0	0	0	0	0	4	14
3	(Czech Republic) Lukáš Zima	0	0	0	0	0	0	0	8

=== Disciplinary record ===
As of 29 May 2026

Rank	Position	Name	Superliga			Superliga European play-offs			Cupa României			Champions League			Europa League			Supercupa României			Total		
Rank	Position	Name	Yellow card	(yellow card) (yellow-red card)	Red card	Yellow card	(yellow card) (yellow-red card)	Red card	Yellow card	(yellow card) (yellow-red card)	Red card	Yellow card	(yellow card) (yellow-red card)	Red card	Yellow card	(yellow card) (yellow-red card)	Red card	Yellow card	(yellow card) (yellow-red card)	Red card	Yellow card	(yellow card) (yellow-red card)	Red card
1	GK	(Romania) Ștefan Târnovanu	2	0	1	0	0	0	0	0	0	0	0	0	0	0	1	0	0	0	2	0	2
2	FW	(Romania) Florin Tănase	3	0	0	1	0	0	0	0	0	0	0	1	4	0	0	0	0	0	8	0	1
3	MF	(Italy) Juri Cisotti	3	0	0	1	0	0	0	0	0	0	0	0	3	0	1	0	0	0	7	0	1
3	MF	(Romania) Mihai Lixandru	5	0	1	1	0	0	0	0	0	0	0	0	1	0	0	0	0	0	7	0	1
5	FW	(Romania) Daniel Bîrligea	1	1	0	0	0	0	0	0	0	0	0	0	3	0	0	0	0	0	4	1	0
6	FW	(Romania) Robert Necșulescu	0	0	0	0	0	0	0	0	1	0	0	0	0	0	0	0	0	0	0	0	1
7	MF	(Uganda) Baba Alhassan	6	0	0	1	0	0	0	0	0	0	0	0	2	0	0	0	0	0	9	0	0
8	DF	(Montenegro) Risto Radunović	6	0	0	0	0	0	1	0	0	0	0	0	1	0	0	0	0	0	8	0	0
9	DF	(South Africa) Siyabonga Ngezana	4	0	0	0	0	0	0	0	0	3	0	0	0	0	0	0	0	0	7	0	0
9	FW	(Romania) David Miculescu	5	0	0	0	0	0	0	0	0	0	0	0	2	0	0	0	0	0	7	0	0
9	MF	(Romania) Darius Olaru	2	0	0	2	0	0	0	0	0	0	0	0	3	0	0	0	0	0	7	0	0
12	DF	(Romania) Alexandru Pantea	5	0	0	0	0	0	0	0	0	0	0	0	1	0	0	0	0	0	6	0	0
12	DF	(Romania) Mihai Popescu	5	0	0	0	0	0	0	0	0	1	0	0	0	0	0	0	0	0	6	0	0
12	DF	(Romania) Valentin Crețu	4	0	0	1	0	0	0	0	0	0	0	0	1	0	0	0	0	0	6	0	0
15	DF	(Bosnia and Herzegovina) Daniel Graovac	5	0	0	0	0	0	0	0	0	0	0	0	0	0	0	0	0	0	5	0	0
15	MF	(Romania) Octavian Popescu	1	0	0	2	0	0	1	0	0	0	0	0	1	0	0	0	0	0	5	0	0
17	MF	(Romania) Adrian Șut	1	0	0	0	0	0	0	0	0	0	0	0	2	0	0	0	0	0	3	0	0
17	FW	(Romania) Dennis Politic	1	0	0	0	0	0	0	0	0	1	0	0	1	0	0	0	0	0	3	0	0
17	DF	(Portugal) André Duarte	3	0	0	0	0	0	0	0	0	0	0	0	0	0	0	0	0	0	3	0	0
17	FW	(Senegal) Mamadou Thiam	2	0	0	0	0	0	1	0	0	0	0	0	0	0	0	0	0	0	3	0	0
17	MF	(Romania) Mihai Toma	2	0	0	1	0	0	0	0	0	0	0	0	0	0	0	0	0	0	3	0	0
22	MF	(Israel) Ofri Arad	1	0	0	1	0	0	0	0	0	0	0	0	0	0	0	0	0	0	2	0	0
23	FW	(Romania) Andrei Gheorghiță	0	0	0	0	0	0	0	0	0	1	0	0	0	0	0	0	0	0	1	0	0
23	FW	(Romania) Marius Ștefănescu	0	0	0	0	0	0	0	0	0	1	0	0	0	0	0	0	0	0	1	0	0
23	FW	(Romania) Alexandru Stoian	1	0	0	0	0	0	0	0	0	0	0	0	0	0	0	0	0	0	1	0	0
23	DF	(Romania) Ionuț Cercel	1	0	0	0	0	0	0	0	0	0	0	0	0	0	0	0	0	0	1	0	0
23	MF	(Romania) Vlad Chiricheș	0	0	0	0	0	0	0	0	0	1	0	0	0	0	0	0	0	0	1	0	0
23	DF	(Benin) David Kiki	1	0	0	0	0	0	0	0	0	0	0	0	0	0	0	0	0	0	1	0	0
23	MF	(Romania) David Popa	0	0	0	0	0	0	1	0	0	0	0	0	0	0	0	0	0	0	1	0	0
23	MF	(Cape Verde) João Paulo	1	0	0	0	0	0	0	0	0	0	0	0	0	0	0	0	0	0	1	0	0
23	DF	(Cameroon) Joyskim Dawa	1	0	0	0	0	0	0	0	0	0	0	0	0	0	0	0	0	0	1	0	0
