= Alexandru Pantea =

Romanian footballer (born 2003)

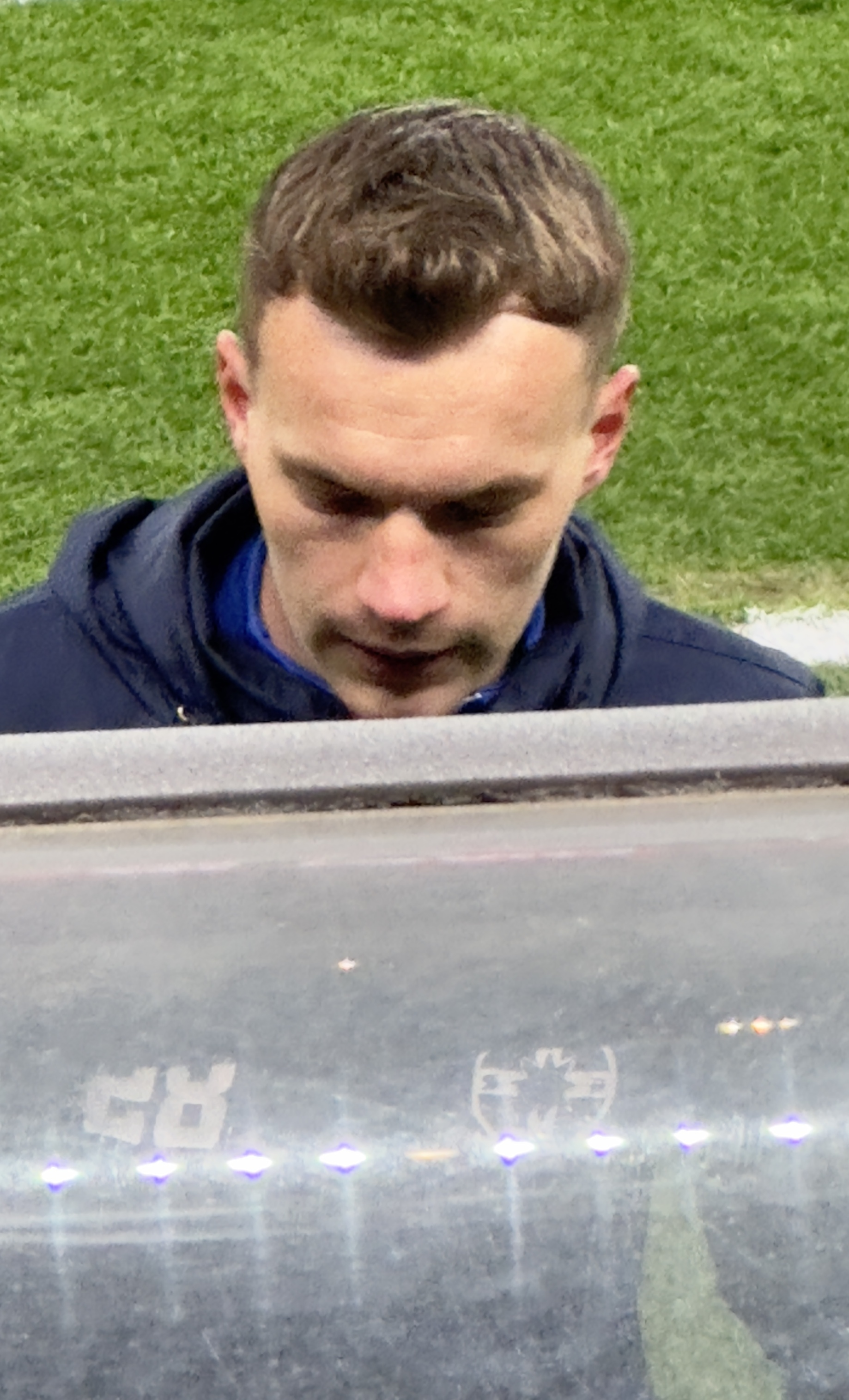
- Pantea with FCSB in 2023

Personal information
- Full name: Grigoraș Alexandru Pantea
- Date of birth: 11 September 2003 (age 23)
- Place of birth: Bucharest, Romania
- Height: 1.78 m (5 ft 10 in)
- Position: Full-back

Team information
- Current team: Levadiakos (on loan from FCSB)
- Number: 2

Youth career
- 2014–2020: FCSB

Senior career*
Years	Team	Apps	(Gls)
2020–	FCSB	75	(0)
2021–2022	→ Hermannstadt (loan)	28	(0)
2026–	→ Levadiakos (loan)	9	(1)

International career^{‡}
2019	Romania U16	4	(0)
2019–2020	Romania U17	7	(0)
2021	Romania U18	1	(0)
2021–2022	Romania U19	14	(3)
2022	Romania U20	2	(0)
2023–2024	Romania U21	12	(0)
2022–	Romania	1	(0)
- * Club domestic league appearances and goals as of 8 November 2026 ‡ National team caps and goals as of 15 October 2024

Grigoraș Alexandru Pantea (born 11 September 2003) is a Romanian professional footballer who plays as a full-back for Super League Greece club Levadiakos, on loan from Liga I side FCSB.

== Club career ==
A youth exponent of his hometown side FCSB, Pantea made his professional debut by starting in a 2–2 Liga I draw with Gaz Metan Mediaș on 21 June 2020. In the process, he became the first player born in 2003 to play in the top flight.

On 7 July 2021, Pantea was sent out on loan to Liga II team Hermannstadt for an undisclosed period. He featured in 28 matches and gained Liga I promotion, before returning to his parent club in the summer of 2022.

== International career ==
Pantea made his full debut for Romania on 20 November 2022, aged 19, after coming on for Cristian Manea in the 70th minute of a 5–0 away thrashing of Moldova. The next year, he was selected in the Romania under-21 squad for the 2023 UEFA European Championship.

== Style of play ==
A full-back, Pantea's ambidexterity makes him capable of operating on both the left and the right sides of the field.

== Career statistics ==
=== Club ===
As of match played 8 November 2026

Appearances and goals by club, season and competition
Club	Season	League			Cupa României		Europe		Other		Total	
Club	Season	Division	Apps	Goals	Apps	Goals	Apps	Goals	Apps	Goals	Apps	Goals
FCSB	2019–20	Liga I	4	0	3	0	—		—		7	0
FCSB	2020–21	Liga I	3	0	0	0	1 (Note: Appearance in UEFA Europa League)	0	0	0	4	0
FCSB	2022–23	Liga I	17	0	1	0	6 (Note: Appearances in UEFA Europa Conference League)	0	—		24	0
FCSB	2023–24	Liga I	20	0	1	0	2	0	—		23	0
FCSB	2024–25	Liga I	8	0	2	0	1	0	0	0	11	0
FCSB	2025–26	Liga I	23	0	2	0	9	0	1 (Note: Appearances in Liga I European play-offs)	0	35	0
FCSB	Total		75	0	9	0	19	0	1	0	104	0
Hermannstadt (loan)	2021–22	Liga II	28	0	2	0	—		—		30	0
Levadiakos (loan)	2026–27	Super League Greece	9	1	1	0	—		—		10	1
Career total			112	1	12	0	19	0	1	0	144	1

=== International ===
As of match played 20 November 2022

Appearances and goals by national team and year
National team	Year	Apps	Goals
Romania	2022	1	0
Total		1	0

== Honours ==
FCSB

- Liga I: 2023–24, 2024–25
- Cupa României: 2019–20
- Supercupa României: 2024, 2025
