= David Popa (footballer, born 2007) =

Romanian footballer

Personal information
- Full name: David Andronic Popa
- Date of birth: 13 March 2007 (age 19)
- Place of birth: Luduș, Romania
- Height: 1.72 m (5 ft 8 in)
- Position: Winger

Team information
- Current team: FCSB/Concordia Chiajna
- Number: 98/

Youth career
- –2019: Luceafărul Cluj
- 2019–2026: FCSB

Senior career*
Years	Team	Apps	(Gls)
2023–	FCSB	12	(0)
2024–2025	→ Politehnica Iași (loan)	2	(0)
2026–	Concordia Chiajna	0	(0)

International career^{‡}
2022	Romania U15	2	(2)
2022–2023	Romania U16	12	(5)
2023–2024	Romania U17	12	(5)
2024–2025	Romania U18	8	(0)
2025–	Romania U19	1	(0)
- * Club domestic league appearances and goals as of 7 November 2026 ‡ National team caps and goals as of 7 September 2025

David Andronic Popa (born 13 March 2007) is a Romanian professional footballer who plays as a winger for Liga I club FCSB and for Liga II club Concordia Chiajna.

== Career statistics ==
As of 7 November 2026

Appearances and goals by club, season and competition
Club	Season	League			Cupa României		Europe		Other		Total	
Club	Season	Division	Apps	Goals	Apps	Goals	Apps	Goals	Apps	Goals	Apps	Goals
FCSB	2023–24	Liga I	3	0	0	0	—		—		3	0
FCSB	2024–25	Liga I	0	0	—		1 (Note: Appearance in UEFA Champions League)	0	0	0	1	0
FCSB	2025–26	Liga I	5	0	2	1	0	0	1 (Note: Appearances in Liga I European play-offs)	0	8	1
FCSB	2026–27	Liga I	4	0	2	1	0	0	—		6	1
FCSB	Total		12	0	4	2	1	0	1	0	18	2
Politehnica Iași (loan)	2024–25	Liga I	2	0	2	0	—		—		4	0
Concordia Chiajna	2026–27	Liga II	0	0	—		—		—		0	0
Career total			14	0	6	2	1	0	1	0	22	2

== Honours ==
FCSB

- Liga I: 2023–24, 2024–25
- Supercupa României: 2024
