= Laurențiu Vlăsceanu =

Romanian footballer (born 2005)

Personal information
- Full name: Laurențiu Constantin Vlăsceanu
- Date of birth: 29 May 2005 (age 21)
- Place of birth: Bucharest, Romania
- Height: 1.72 m (5 ft 8 in)
- Positions: Left winger; left-back

Team information
- Current team: CSA Steaua București
- Number: 77

Youth career
- AS Toni Doboș
- –2021: Prosport București
- 2021–2022: Academica Clinceni
- 2022–2023: FCSB

Senior career*
| Years | Team | Apps | (Gls) |
| 2022 | Academica Clinceni | 4 | (0) |
| 2023–2026 | FCSB | 0 | (0) |
| 2023–2025 | → Unirea Slobozia (loan) | 49 | (6) |
| 2025–2026 | → UTA Arad (loan) | 4 | (0) |
| 2026 | → Unirea Slobozia (loan) | 2 | (0) |
| 2026– | CSA Steaua București | 2 | (0) |

International career
| 2021–2022 | Romania U17 | 1 | (0) |
| 2022–2023 | Romania U18 | 7 | (0) |
| 2023 | Romania U19 | 4 | (0) |
- * Club domestic league appearances and goals as of 25 October 2026

Laurențiu Constantin Vlăsceanu (born 29 May 2005) is a Romanian professional footballer who plays as a left winger or a left-back for Liga II club CSA Steaua București.

== Career statistics ==
As of 25 October 2026

Appearances and goals by club, season and competition
| Club | Season | League | | | Cupa României | | Europe | | Other | | Total | |
| Club | Season | Division | Apps | Goals | Apps | Goals | Apps | Goals | Apps | Goals | Apps | Goals |
|---|---|---|---|---|---|---|---|---|---|---|---|---|
| Academica Clinceni | 2021–22 | Liga I | 4 | 0 | — | | — | | — | | 4 | 0 |
| FCSB | 2022–23 | Liga I | 0 | 0 | 1 | 0 | 0 | 0 | — | | 1 | 0 |
| FCSB | 2025–26 | Liga I | 0 | 0 | — | | 0 | 0 | 0 | 0 | 0 | 0 |
| FCSB | Total | | 0 | 0 | 1 | 0 | 0 | 0 | 0 | 0 | 1 | 0 |
| Unirea Slobozia (loan) | 2023–24 | Liga II | 29 | 5 | 1 | 0 | — | | — | | 30 | 5 |
| Unirea Slobozia (loan) | 2024–25 | Liga I | 20 | 1 | 1 | 0 | — | | 2 (Note: Appearance in Liga I promotion/relegation play-offs) | 0 | 23 | 1 |
| Unirea Slobozia (loan) | Total | | 49 | 6 | 2 | 0 | — | | 2 | 0 | 53 | 6 |
| UTA Arad (loan) | 2025–26 | Liga I | 4 | 0 | 0 | 0 | — | | — | | 4 | 0 |
| Unirea Slobozia (loan) | 2025–26 | Liga I | 2 | 0 | — | | — | | — | | 2 | 0 |
| CSA Steaua București | 2026–27 | Liga II | 2 | 0 | 0 | 0 | — | | — | | 2 | 0 |
| Career Total | | | 61 | 6 | 3 | 0 | 0 | 0 | 2 | 0 | 66 | 6 |

== Honours ==
Unirea Slobozia

- Liga II: 2023–24

FCSB

- Supercupa României: 2025
