= Florin Tănase =

Romanian footballer (born 1994)

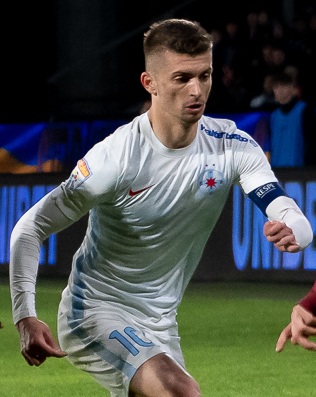
- Tănase with FCSB in 2022

Personal information
- Full name: Florin Lucian Tănase
- Date of birth: 30 December 1994 (age 31)
- Place of birth: Găești, Romania
- Height: 1.86 m (6 ft 1 in)
- Positions: Attacking midfielder; forward

Team information
- Current team: Omonia
- Number: 17

Youth career
- 2000–2010: LPS Viitorul Pitești
- 2010–2013: Gheorghe Hagi Academy

Senior career*
Years	Team	Apps	(Gls)
2013–2016	Viitorul Constanța	79	(22)
2013	→ Voluntari (loan)	12	(1)
2016–2022	FCSB	189	(76)
2022–2023	Al Jazira	21	(2)
2023–2024	Al-Okhdood	25	(2)
2024–2026	FCSB	70	(20)
2026–	Omonia	7	(1)

International career^{‡}
2014–2016	Romania U21	9	(3)
2014–	Romania	30	(5)
- * Club domestic league appearances and goals as of 1 November 2026 ‡ National team caps and goals as of 5 October 2026

Florin Lucian Tănase (Romanian pronunciation: [floˈrin lutʃiˈan təˈnase]; born 30 December 1994) is a Romanian professional footballer who plays as an attacking midfielder or a forward for Cypriot First Division club Omonia and for the Romania national team.

Tănase started out as a senior at third league club Voluntari in 2013, while on loan from Viitorul Constanța. He went on to appear in over 70 Liga I games for the latter, before transferring to FCSB for a €1.5 million fee in 2016. In the 2020–21 and 2021–22 seasons, Tănase finished as the league's top goalscorer.

Internationally, Tănase made his full debut for Romania in a 1–0 friendly victory over Albania in May 2014, aged 19.

== Club career ==
=== Viitorul Constanța ===
On 23 February 2014, aged 19, Tănase scored his first Liga I goal for Viitorul Constanța in a 2–1 away win against Dinamo București.

=== FCSB ===
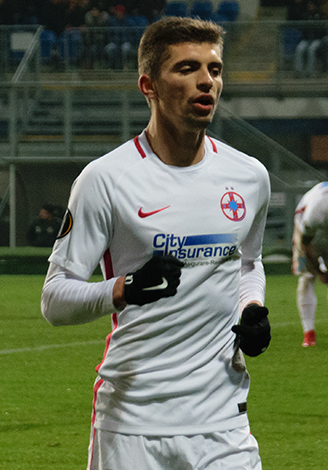
Tănase playing for FCSB, November 2017

On 8 August 2016, FCSB—then named FC Steaua București—signed Tănase on a five-year deal for a reported €1.5 million transfer fee, with Viitorul Constanța retaining 25% interest on a future move. He was assigned the number 10 jersey and scored on debut four days later, in a 2–0 away victory over Botoșani.

Tănase scored his first European goal for the Roș-albaștrii on 2 August 2017, in a 4–1 away victory over Viktoria Plzeň in the UEFA Champions League third qualifying round.

In the 2020–21 season, Tănase netted 24 times to become the league's top scorer, and was thus named in the Liga I Team of the Year.

On 25 April 2022, Tănase scored his first professional hat-trick in a 4–0 away victory over his former team Viitorul Constanța, now named Farul. He went on to finish as Liga I top scorer for the second campaign in a row, after netting 20 times.

=== Al Jazira ===
On 6 August 2022, Emirati club Al Jazira announced the signing of Tănase after meeting his €3 million release clause.

=== Al-Okhdood ===
On 5 August 2023, Tănase joined Saudi Pro League club Al-Okhdood on a free transfer.

== International career ==
On 31 May 2014, Tănase earned his first cap for Romania national team in a 1–0 friendly win over Albania, coming on as an 83rd-minute substitute for Alexandru Maxim. He appeared sparingly for the country in the following years, and only scored his first goal on 25 March 2021, in a 3–2 defeat of North Macedonia in the 2022 FIFA World Cup qualifiers.

== Style of play ==
Tănase is a versatile footballer who can occupy several positions along the front-line, but has stated that prefers to be deployed as an advanced playmaker. Romanian manager and former player Gheorghe Hagi regarded him as one of the most promising talents of his generation; in spite of this, Tănase has been accused by opponents and media alike of excessive diving, especially during his first stint at FCSB.

== Career statistics ==
=== Club ===
As of match played 8 November 2026

Appearances and goals by club, season and competition
Club	Season	League			National cup (Note: Includes Cupa României, UAE President's Cup)		League cup (Note: Includes Cupa Ligii, UAE League Cup)		Continental		Other		Total	
Club	Season	Division	Apps	Goals	Apps	Goals	Apps	Goals	Apps	Goals	Apps	Goals	Apps	Goals
Viitorul Constanța	2013–14	Liga I	12	3	0	0	—		—		—		12	3
Viitorul Constanța	2014–15	Liga I	32	4	0	0	2	1	—		—		34	5
Viitorul Constanța	2015–16	Liga I	32	15	2	1	1	0	—		—		35	16
Viitorul Constanța	2016–17	Liga I	3	0	—		—		2 (Note: Appearances in UEFA Europa League)	0	—		5	0
Viitorul Constanța	Total		79	22	2	1	3	1	2	0	—		86	24
Voluntari (loan)	2013–14	Liga III	12	1	2	0	—		—		—		14	1
FCSB	2016–17	Liga I	22	4	0	0	1	0	2	0	—		25	4
FCSB	2017–18	Liga I	33	10	1	0	—		11 (Note: Four appearances and one goal in UEFA Champions League, seven appearances in UEFA Europa League)	1	—		45	11
FCSB	2018–19	Liga I	34	10	1	0	—		5	1	—		40	11
FCSB	2019–20	Liga I	30	7	5	0	—		8	4	—		43	11
FCSB	2020–21	Liga I	34	24	0	0	—		1	1	1 (Note: Appearance in Supercupa României)	0	36	25
FCSB	2021–22	Liga I	34	20	0	0	—		2 (Note: Appearances in UEFA Europa Conference League)	0	—		36	20
FCSB	2022–23	Liga I	2	1	0	0	—		1	0	—		3	1
FCSB	Total		189	76	7	0	1	0	30	7	1	0	228	83
Al Jazira	2022–23	UAE Pro League	21	2	2	3	1	1	—		—		24	6
Al-Okhdood	2023–24	Saudi Pro League	25	2	0	0	—		—		—		25	2
FCSB	2024–25	Liga I	28	4	1	0	—		12	1	—		41	5
FCSB	2025–26	Liga I	36	15	2	0	—		11 (Note: Three appearances in UEFA Champions League, eight appearances and one goal in UEFA Europa League)	1	3 (Note: One appearance in Supercupa României, two appearances and one goal in Liga I European play-offs)	1	52	17
FCSB	2026–27	Liga I	6	1	—		—		2	0	—		8	1
FCSB	Total		70	20	3	0	—		25	2	3	1	101	23
Omonia	2026–27	Cypriot First Division	7	1	0	0	—		4	0	1 (Note: Appearance in Cypriot Super Cup)	0	12	1
Career total			403	124	16	4	5	2	61	9	5	1	490	140

=== International ===
As of match played 5 October 2026

Appearances and goals by national team and year
National team	Year	Apps	Goals
Romania	2014	1	0
Romania	2015	0	0
Romania	2016	1	0
Romania	2017	1	0
Romania	2018	0	0
Romania	2019	0	0
Romania	2020	2	0
Romania	2021	5	1
Romania	2022	5	1
Romania	2023	2	0
Romania	2024	1	1
Romania	2025	8	2
Romania	2026	4	0
Total		30	5

Scores and results list Romania's goal tally first, score column indicates score after each Tănase goal.

List of international goals scored by Florin Tănase
No.	Date	Venue	Cap	Opponent	Score	Result	Competition
1	25 March 2021	Arena Națională, Bucharest, Romania	6	North Macedonia	1–0	3–2	2022 FIFA World Cup qualification
2	23 September 2022	Helsinki Olympic Stadium, Helsinki, Finland	15	Finland	1–1	1–1	2022–23 UEFA Nations League B
3	26 March 2024	Metropolitano Stadium, Madrid, Spain	18	Colombia	2–3	2–3	Friendly
4	7 June 2025	Ernst-Happel-Stadion, Vienna, Austria	20	Austria	1–2	1–2	2026 FIFA World Cup qualification
5	10 June 2025	Arena Națională, Bucharest, Romania	21	Cyprus	1–0	2–0	2026 FIFA World Cup qualification

== Honours ==
Viitorul Constanța

- Liga I: 2016–17

FCSB

- Liga I: 2024–25
- Cupa României: 2019–20
- Supercupa României: 2025

Omonia

- Cypriot Super Cup runner-up: 2026

Individual

- Gazeta Sporturilor Romanian Footballer of the Year runner-up: 2022
- Liga I top scorer: 2020–21, 2021–22
- Liga I Team of the Season: 2020–21, 2021–22
- Liga I Team of the Regular Season: 2018–19
- DigiSport Liga I Player of the Month: December 2017
