= Baba Alhassan =

Ugandan footballer (born 2000)

Personal information
- Full name: Baba Alhassan
- Date of birth: 3 January 2000 (age 26)
- Place of birth: Accra, Ghana
- Height: 1.84 m (6 ft 0 in)
- Positions: Defensive midfielder; centre-back

Team information
- Current team: Mardin 1969
- Number: 42

Youth career
- African Talent Football Academy
- –2019: Real Valladolid

Senior career*
Years	Team	Apps	(Gls)
2018–2019	Real Valladolid B	2	(0)
2020–2024	Hermannstadt	97	(16)
2024–2026	FCSB	72	(2)
2026–	Mardin 1969	7	(0)

International career^{‡}
2025–	Uganda	6	(0)
- * Club domestic league appearances and goals as of 24 September 2026 ‡ National team caps and goals as of 24 September 2026

Baba Alhassan (born 3 January 2000) is a professional footballer who plays as a defensive midfielder or a centre-back for TFF 1. Lig club Mardin 1969. Born in Ghana, he represents Uganda at international level.

== Career ==
=== Early career / Real Valladolid ===
Born in Accra, Alhassan started out as a junior at the African Talent Football Academy in Ghana. He then moved to the youth setup of Spanish club Real Valladolid, making his senior debut for the reserves in a 2–3 away Segunda División B loss to Navalcarnero on 28 October 2018.

=== Hermannstadt ===
On 7 October 2020, Alhassan joined Romanian team Hermannstadt as a free agent. Eleven days later, he made his Liga I debut in a 1–1 draw with UTA Arad. He scored his first goal—and the only of the match—in a league fixture against Politehnica Iași on 15 May 2021. Alhassan amassed 24 appearances in all competitions in the 2020–21 season, with his club losing the relegation play-offs against Mioveni 1–2 on aggregate.

The following campaign, Alhassan aided with seven goals from 27 league appearances as "the Red and Blacks" finished as Liga II runners-up and returned to the top division. On 15 July 2022, in the season's opener, he scored his first Liga I double in a 3–0 Liga I home defeat of Mioveni.

In October 2023, Alhassan agreed to a contract extension lasting until 2026. On 9 December, Hermannstadt chairman Dănuț Coman stated that he was in negotiations with fellow league clubs and rivals FCSB and Rapid București for the transfer of Alhassan.

=== FCSB ===
On 12 December 2023, FCSB general manager Mihai Stoica announced the signing of Alhassan, with the player due to join the team in the winter transfer window. The Roș-albaștrii paid €600,000 and Hermannstadt also retained 20% interest on the capital gain of a possible future transfer. The move was confirmed by FCSB on 23 December.

Alhassan recorded his debut on 21 January 2024, coming on as a 75th-minute substitute for Octavian Popescu in a 4–0 Liga I thrashing of UTA Arad.

== International career ==
Baba Alhassan received his first national team call up from Uganda in November 2025 for their friendly matches against Chad and Morocco.

== Career statistics ==
As of match played 24 September 2026

Appearances and goals by club, season and competition
Club	Season	League			Cupa României		Europe		Other		Total	
Club	Season	Division	Apps	Goals	Apps	Goals	Apps	Goals	Apps	Goals	Apps	Goals
Real Valladolid B	2018–19	Segunda División B	2	0	0	0	—		—		2	0
Hermannstadt	2020–21	Liga I	21	1	1	0	—		2 (Note: Appearances in Liga I promotion/relegation play-offs)	0	24	1
Hermannstadt	2021–22	Liga II	27	7	3	0	—		—		30	7
Hermannstadt	2022–23	Liga I	30	6	3	1	—		—		33	7
Hermannstadt	2023–24	Liga I	19	2	3	1	—		—		22	3
Hermannstadt	Total		97	16	10	2	—		2	0	109	18
FCSB	2023–24	Liga I	17	0	—		—		—		17	0
FCSB	2024–25	Liga I	29	2	3	0	17 (Note: Six appearances in UEFA Champions League, eleven appearances in UEFA Europa League)	0	1 (Note: Appearance in Supercupa României)	0	50	2
FCSB	2025–26	Liga I	26	0	3	0	12 (Note: Three appearances in UEFA Champions League, nine appearances in UEFA Europa League)	0	2 (Note: One appearance in Supercupa României, one appearance in Liga I European play-offs)	0	43	0
FCSB	Total		72	2	6	0	29	0	3	0	110	2
Mardin 1969	2020–21	TFF 1. Lig	7	0	0	0	—		—		7	0
Career total			178	18	16	2	29	0	5	0	228	20

=== International ===
As of match played 30 December 2025

Appearances and goals by national team and year
National team	Year	Apps	Goals
Uganda	2025	5	0
Total		5	0

== Honours ==
FCSB

- Liga I: 2023–24, 2024–25
- Supercupa României: 2024, 2025

Individual

- Gazeta Sporturilor Romania Player of the Month: September 2022
