= Alexandru Stoian =

Romanian footballer (born 2007)

Personal information
- Full name: Alexandru Constantin Stoian
- Date of birth: 15 December 2007 (age 18)
- Place of birth: Madrid, Spain
- Height: 1.83 m (6 ft 0 in)
- Position: Forward

Team information
- Current team: FCSB/Concordia Chiajna
- Number: 90/

Youth career
- 2015–2020: Școala de Fotbal Benfica București
- 2020–2021: Prosport Academy
- 2021–2022: Academica Clinceni
- 2022–2024: Gheorghe Hagi Academy

Senior career*
Years	Team	Apps	(Gls)
2022–2025	Farul Constanța	10	(0)
2025–	FCSB	39	(8)
2026–	Concordia Chiajna	0	(0)

International career^{‡}
2022	Romania U15	5	(1)
2022–2023	Romania U16	13	(4)
2023–2024	Romania U17	11	(4)
2025	Romania U18	2	(0)
2024–	Romania U19	18	(1)
2025–	Romania U20	1	(0)
2026–	Romania U21	1	(0)
- * Club domestic league appearances and goals as of 22 November 2026 ‡ National team caps and goals as of 13 November 2026

Alexandru Constantin Stoian (born 15 December 2007) is a Romanian professional footballer who plays as a forward for Liga I club FCSB and for Liga II club Concordia Chiajna.

== Early life ==
Alexandru Stoian was born in Madrid, Spain, but grew up in Romania, starting to play in the Benfica academy of Bucharest, before moving to the Academica Clinceni.

== Club career ==
Alexandru Stoian made his professional debut for Farul Constanța on the 28 October 2022, playing the last minutes of a 1–2 away Liga I win over U Craiova. Having made his debut in this tight game, with Farul sitting top of the table, the young forward became one of the youngest footballers to ever play in the Romanian top tier at the age of 14 years, 10 months, and 13 days, second only to former international Nicolae Dobrin.

== International career ==
Stoian is a youth international for Romania, having become by 2022 a key player of the under-16 team.

== Career statistics ==
As of match played 22 November 2026

Appearances and goals by club, season and competition
Club	Season	League			Cupa României		Continental		Other		Total	
Club	Season	Division	Apps	Goals	Apps	Goals	Apps	Goals	Apps	Goals	Apps	Goals
Farul Constanța	2022–23	Liga I	1	0	0	0	—		—		1	0
Farul Constanța	2023–24	Liga I	2	0	2	0	0	0	0	0	4	0
Farul Constanța	2024–25	Liga I	7	0	2	0	—		—		9	0
Farul Constanța	Total		10	0	4	0	0	0	0	0	14	0
FCSB	2024–25	Liga I	2	1	—		0	0	—		2	1
FCSB	2025–26	Liga I	22	4	2	1	1 (Note: Appearance in UEFA Champions League)	0	1 (Note: Appearances in Liga I European play-offs)	0	26	5
FCSB	2026–27	Liga I	15	3	2	0	2 (Note: Appearances in UEFA Conference League)	0	—		10	3
FCSB	Total		39	8	4	1	3	0	1	0	47	9
Concordia Chiajna	2026–27	Liga II	0	0	—		—		—		0	0
Career total			49	8	8	1	3	0	1	0	61	9

== Honours ==
Farul Constanța

- Liga I: 2022–23
- Supercupa României runner-up: 2023

FCSB

- Liga I: 2024–25
- Supercupa României: 2025
