= Mihai Popescu (footballer) =

Romanian footballer (born 1993)

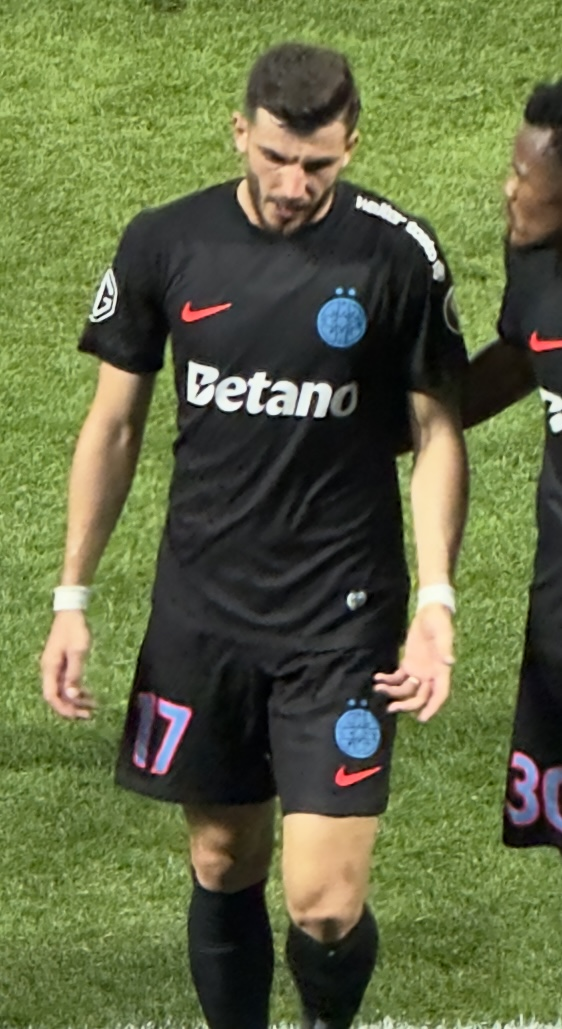
- Popescu with FCSB in 2025

Personal information
- Date of birth: 7 May 1993 (age 33)
- Place of birth: Câmpulung, Romania
- Height: 1.88 m (6 ft 2 in)
- Position: Centre-back

Team information
- Current team: FCSB
- Number: 17

Youth career
- 2003–2011: Sporting Pitești
- 2011–2012: Dinamo București

Senior career*
Years	Team	Apps	(Gls)
2012–2013	Dinamo II București	13	(0)
2013–2020	Dinamo București	63	(5)
2013–2015	→ Dunărea Călărași (loan)	54	(2)
2015	→ Berceni (loan)	11	(0)
2015–2016	→ Dunărea Călărași (loan)	30	(0)
2017	→ Voluntari (loan)	18	(0)
2019	→ St Mirren (loan)	17	(0)
2020–2022	Heart of Midlothian	18	(1)
2021–2022	→ Hamilton Academical (loan)	31	(1)
2022–2024	Farul Constanța	73	(2)
2024–	FCSB	41	(1)

International career^{‡}
2025–	Romania	8	(1)
- * Club domestic league appearances and goals as of 27 September 2026 ‡ National team caps and goals as of 6 June 2026

Mihai Popescu (born 7 May 1993) is a Romanian professional footballer who plays as a centre-back for Liga I club FCSB and the Romania national team.

Popescu started his senior career at Dunărea Călărași in 2013, while on loan from Dinamo București. He made his professional debut for the latter side in 2016, and had multiple loan spells before moving to Heart of Midlothian in 2020. After returning from Scotland, Popescu signed with Farul Constanța and won his first national title in the 2022–23 season. In 2024, his performances earned him a transfer to FCSB, the cross-town rival of his former club Dinamo București.

Internationally, Popescu registered his debut for Romania in March 2025, in a 0–1 home loss to Bosnia and Herzegovina in the FIFA World Cup qualifiers.

== Club career ==
=== Dinamo București and various loans ===
Popescu joined Liga I club Dinamo București from Sporting Pitești in 2011. Following loans to Dunărea Călărași, Berceni, and again Dunărea Călărași, he recorded his debut for Dinamo on 11 August 2016, starting in a 2–1 away win over Voluntari in the Cupa Ligii. On 12 September, Popescu made his Liga I debut in a 1–2 away loss to ASA Târgu Mureș.

In the summer of 2017, Popescu was sent on loan to fellow league club Voluntari, where he spent half of season. Upon his return to Dinamo, he scored his first Liga I goal on 12 March 2018, in a 3–0 home defeat of Gaz Metan Mediaș. On 29 July that year, he netted in a 3–3 away derby draw with FCSB. Popescu moved abroad for the first time by being loaned to Scottish Premiership side St Mirren in January 2019. After St Mirren manager Oran Kearney left the team, he returned to Bucharest in July that year.

=== Heart of Midlothian and loan to Hamilton Academical ===
In September 2020, Popescu signed a two-year contract with Scottish Championship club Heart of Midlothian. After the team achieved promotion to the Scottish Premiership as league winners, on 31 August 2021 he was sent to Championship side Hamilton Academical on loan until the end of the campaign.

=== Farul Constanța ===
In July 2022, Popescu left Hearts as a free agent and returned to his native Romania, signing a two-year contract with Liga I side Farul Constanța. In his debut season, he made 30 league appearances and scored one goal to aid the club in winning the national title.

Popescu made his debut in European competitions on 12 July 2023, starting in a 1–0 home victory over Sheriff Tiraspol in the UEFA Champions League first qualifying round (1–3 loss on aggregate). On 24 August that year, he scored his first European goal after coming on as a substitute in a 2–1 home win over HJK in the Europa Conference League play-off round (2–3 on aggregate).

=== FCSB ===
On 4 September 2024, Popescu signed a one-year contract with Romanian reigning champions FCSB, the city rivals of his former club Dinamo București. Club owner Gigi Becali stated that the transfer fee amounted to €250,000.

Popescu soon became a regular starter for the Roș-albaștrii, appearing in 12 Europa League matches—ten of them as a starter—across the group stage and knockout rounds. Domestically, he featured in 25 Liga I games, helping the club secure a second consecutive title.

== International career ==
Popescu made his debut for the Romania national team on 21 March 2025, aged 31, starting in a 0–1 home loss to Bosnia and Herzegovina in the 2026 FIFA World Cup qualifiers. Three days later, he scored in a 5–1 away thrashing of San Marino counting for the same competition.

== Career statistics ==
=== Club ===
As of match played 29 October 2026.

Appearances and goals by club, season and competition
Club	Season	League			National cup (Note: Includes Cupa României, Scottish Cup)		League cup (Note: Includes Cupa Ligii, Scottish League Cup)		Continental		Other		Total	
Club	Season	Division	Apps	Goals	Apps	Goals	Apps	Goals	Apps	Goals	Apps	Goals	Apps	Goals
Dinamo II București	2012–13	Liga II	13	0	—		—		—		—		13	0
Dinamo București	2016–17	Liga I	11	0	1	0	2	0	—		—		14	0
Dinamo București	2017–18	Liga I	12	2	0	0	—		—		—		12	2
Dinamo București	2018–19	Liga I	16	2	1	0	—		—		—		17	2
Dinamo București	2019–20	Liga I	24	1	3	0	—		—		—		27	1
Dinamo București	Total		63	5	5	0	2	0	—		—		70	5
Dunărea Călărași (loan)	2012–13	Liga III	?	?	?	?	—		—		—		?	?
Dunărea Călărași (loan)	2013–14	Liga III	?	?	?	?	—		—		—		?	?
Dunărea Călărași (loan)	2014–15	Liga III	?	?	?	?	—		—		—		?	?
Dunărea Călărași (loan)	Total		54	2	?	?	—		—		—		54	2
Berceni (loan)	2014–15	Liga II	11	0	—		—		—		—		11	0
Dunărea Călărași (loan)	2015–16	Liga II	30	0	—		—		—		2 (Note: Appearances in Liga I promotion/relegation play-offs)	0	32	0
Voluntari (loan)	2017–18	Liga I	18	0	1	0	—		—		1 (Note: Appearance in Supercupa României)	0	20	0
St Mirren (loan)	2018–19	Scottish Premiership	17	0	2	0	—		—		2 (Note: Appearances in Scottish Premiership promotion/relegation play-offs)	0	21	0
Heart of Midlothian	2020–21	Scottish Championship	18	1	1	0	5	0	—		—		24	1
Heart of Midlothian	2021–22	Scottish Premiership	0	0	—		0	0	—		—		0	0
Heart of Midlothian	Total		18	1	1	0	5	0	—		—		24	1
Hamilton Academical (loan)	2021–22	Scottish Championship	31	1	1	0	—		—		0	0	32	1
Farul Constanța	2022–23	Liga I	30	1	3	0	—		—		—		33	1
Farul Constanța	2023–24	Liga I	35	1	1	0	—		8 (Note: Two appearances in UEFA Champions League, six appearances and one goal in UEFA Europa Conference League)	1	1	0	45	2
Farul Constanța	2024–25	Liga I	8	0	—		—		—		—		8	0
Farul Constanța	Total		73	2	4	0	—		8	1	1	0	86	3
FCSB	2024–25	Liga I	25	0	2	0	—		12 (Note: Appearances in UEFA Europa League)	0	—		39	0
FCSB	2025–26	Liga I	16	1	0	0	—		9 (Note: Three appearances in UEFA Champions League, six appearances in UEFA Europa League)	0	3 (Note: One appearance in Supercupa României, two appearances in Liga I European play-offs)	0	28	1
FCSB	2026–27	Liga I	0	0	1	0	—		0	0	—		1	0
FCSB	Total		41	1	3	0	—		21	0	3	0	68	1
Career total			369	12	17	0	7	0	29	1	9	0	431	13

=== International ===
As of match played 6 June 2026.

Appearances and goals by national team and year
National team	Year	Apps	Goals
Romania
Romania	2025	7	1
Romania	2026	1	0
Total		8	1

Scores and results list Romania's goal tally first, score column indicates score after each Popescu goal.

List of international goals scored by Mihai Popescu
No.	Date	Venue	Cap	Opponent	Score	Result	Competition
1	24 March 2025	San Marino Stadium, Serravalle, San Marino	2	San Marino	2–0	5–1	2026 FIFA World Cup qualification

== Honours ==
Dinamo București

- Cupa Ligii: 2016–17

Voluntari

- Supercupa României: 2017

Heart of Midlothian

- Scottish Championship: 2020–21

Farul Constanța

- Liga I: 2022–23
- Supercupa României runner-up: 2023

FCSB

- Liga I: 2024–25
- Supercupa României: 2025
