= Ionuț Cercel =

Romanian footballer (born 2006)

Personal information
- Full name: Ionuț Darius Cercel
- Date of birth: 14 November 2006 (age 20)
- Place of birth: Constanța, Romania
- Height: 1.86 m (6 ft 1 in)
- Positions: Defender; defensive midfielder

Team information
- Current team: Farul Constanța (on loan from FCSB)
- Number: 13

Youth career
- 2014–2024: Gheorghe Hagi Academy

Senior career*
Years	Team	Apps	(Gls)
2024–2025	Farul Constanța	12	(0)
2025–	FCSB	13	(0)
2026–	→ Farul Constanța (loan)	1	(0)

International career^{‡}
2022–2023	Romania U17	4	(0)
2023–2024	Romania U18	5	(0)
2024–2025	Romania U19	12	(2)
2025–	Romania U20	1	(0)
- * Club domestic league appearances and goals as of 20 September 2026 ‡ National team caps and goals as of 14 November 2025

Ionuț Darius Cercel (born 14 November 2006) is a Romanian professional footballer who plays as a defender or a defensive midfielder for Liga I club Farul Constanța, on loan from FCSB.

== Career statistics ==
As of 20 September 2026

Appearances and goals by club, season and competition
Club	Season	League			Cupa României		Europe		Other		Total	
Club	Season	Division	Apps	Goals	Apps	Goals	Apps	Goals	Apps	Goals	Apps	Goals
Farul Constanța	2023–24	Liga I	0	0	2	0	0	0	0	0	2	0
Farul Constanța	2024–25	Liga I	12	0	1	0	—		—		13	0
Farul Constanța	Total		12	0	3	0	0	0	0	0	15	0
FCSB	2024–25	Liga I	3	0	—		0	0	—		3	0
FCSB	2025–26	Liga I	10	0	0	0	0	0	1 (Note: Appearance in Supercupa României)	0	11	0
FCSB	Total		13	0	0	0	0	0	1	0	14	0
Farul Constanța (loan)	2026–27	Liga I	1	0	1	0	—		—		2	0
Career total			26	0	4	0	0	0	1	0	31	0

== Honours ==
FCSB

- Liga I: 2024–25
- Supercupa României: 2025
