= Mihai Lixandru =

Romanian footballer

Personal information
- Full name: Mihai Daniel Lixandru
- Date of birth: 5 June 2001 (age 25)
- Place of birth: Bucharest, Romania
- Height: 1.84 m (6 ft 0 in)
- Positions: Defensive midfielder; centre-back

Team information
- Current team: Al-Fateh
- Number: 8

Youth career
- 2010–2020: FCSB

Senior career*
Years	Team	Apps	(Gls)
2020–2026	FCSB	77	(6)
2020–2021	→ Viitorul Târgu Jiu (loan)	21	(1)
2021–2022	→ Gaz Metan Mediaș (loan)	17	(1)
2022	→ Mioveni (loan)	12	(0)
2022–2023	→ Mioveni (loan)	30	(1)
2026–	Al-Fateh	12	(0)

International career
2022–2023	Romania U21	9	(0)
- * Club domestic league appearances and goals as of 15 Novemmber 2026

Mihai Daniel Lixandru (born 5 June 2001) is a Romanian professional footballer who plays as a defensive midfielder or a centre-back for Saudi Pro League club Al-Fateh.

== Career statistics ==
As of match played 15 November 2026

Appearances and goals by club, season and competition
Club	Season	League			National cup (Note: Includes Cupa României, King's Cup)		Europe		Other		Total	
Club	Season	Division	Apps	Goals	Apps	Goals	Apps	Goals	Apps	Goals	Apps	Goals
Viitorul Târgu Jiu (loan)	2020–21	Liga II	21	1	3	0	—		—		24	1
Gaz Metan Mediaș (loan)	2021–22	Liga I	17	1	1	0	—		—		18	1
Mioveni (loan)	2021–22	Liga I	12	0	—		—		—		12	0
Mioveni (loan)	2022–23	Liga I	30	1	2	0	—		—		32	1
Mioveni (loan)	Total		42	1	2	0	—		—		44	1
FCSB	2022–23	Liga I	0	0	0	0	2 (Note: Appearances in UEFA Europa Conference League)	0	—		2	0
FCSB	2023–24	Liga I	34	1	3	0	1	0	—		38	1
FCSB	2024–25	Liga I	13	1	0	0	9 (Note: Five appearances in UEFA Champions League, four appearances in UEFA Europa League)	0	1 (Note: Appearance in Supercupa României)	0	23	1
FCSB	2025–26	Liga I	30	4	1	0	11 (Note: Two appearances in UEFA Champions League, nine appearances in UEFA Europa League)	0	3 (Note: One appearance in Supercupa României, two appearances in Liga I European play-offs)	0	45	4
FCSB	2026–27	Liga I	0	0	—		0	0	—		0	0
FCSB	Total		77	6	4	0	23	0	4	0	108	6
Al-Fateh	2026–27	Saudi Pro League	12	0	1	0	—		—		13	0
Career total			169	9	11	0	23	0	4	0	207	9

== Honours ==
FCSB

- Liga I: 2023–24, 2024–25
- Supercupa României: 2024, 2025
