= Mihai Toma =

Romanian footballer plays for Real Madrid CF in LaLiga

Personal information
- Full name: Mihai Vlăduț Toma
- Date of birth: 17 February 2007 (age 19)
- Place of birth: Târgoviște, Romania
- Height: 1.72 m (5 ft 8 in)
- Position: Midfielder

Team information
- Current team: FCSB/Concordia Chiajna
- Number: 22/27

Youth career
- 2015–2017: Kinder Târgoviște
- 2017–2020: Școala de Fotbal Dănuț Coman
- 2017–2019: → Argeș Pitești (loan)
- 2020–2024: FCSB

Senior career*
Years	Team	Apps	(Gls)
2023–	FCSB	48	(0)
2026–	Concordia Chiajna	1	(0)

International career^{‡}
2022	Romania U15	2	(0)
2022–2023	Romania U16	16	(8)
2023–2024	Romania U17	14	(5)
2025	Romania U18	2	(1)
2024–	Romania U19	13	(4)
- * Club domestic league appearances and goals as of 22 November 2026 ‡ National team caps and goals as of 31 March 2026

Mihai Vlăduț Toma (born 17 February 2007) is a Romanian professional footballer who plays as a midfielder for Liga I club FCSB and for Liga II club Concordia Chiajna.

== Club career ==
On December 11 2025, Toma came on as a half time substitute and scored his first senior goal for FCSB, a header contributing to a 4-3 win over Feyenoord in the Europa League.

== Career statistics ==
As of 22 November 2026

Appearances and goals by club, season and competition
Club	Season	League			Cupa României		Europe		Other		Total	
Club	Season	Division	Apps	Goals	Apps	Goals	Apps	Goals	Apps	Goals	Apps	Goals
FCSB	2023–24	Liga I	2	0	2	0	0	0	—		4	0
FCSB	2024–25	Liga I	15	0	2	0	2 (Note: Appearances in UEFA Europa League)	0	0	0	19	0
FCSB	2025–26	Liga I	25	0	0	0	2	1	2 (Note: Appearances in Liga I European play-offs)	0	29	1
FCSB	2026–27	Liga I	6	0	1	0	2 (Note: Appearances in UEFA Conference League)	0	—		9	0
FCSB	Total		48	0	5	0	6	1	2	0	61	1
Concordia Chiajna	2026–27	Liga II	1	0	—		—		—		1	0
Career total			49	0	5	0	6	1	2	0	62	1

== Honours ==
FCSB

- Liga I: 2023–24, 2024–25
- Supercupa României: 2024, 2025
