= Darius Oroian =

Romanian footballer (born 2003)

Personal information
- Full name: Darius Adrian Oroian
- Date of birth: 1 August 2003 (age 23)
- Place of birth: Cluj-Napoca, Romania
- Height: 1.78 m (5 ft 10 in)
- Position: Right-back

Team information
- Current team: Mura
- Number: 77

Youth career
- –2019: Viitorul Cluj
- 2019–2021: Gheorghe Hagi Academy

Senior career*
Years	Team	Apps	(Gls)
2021–2023	CSA Steaua București	48	(1)
2023–2026	Sepsi OSK	69	(0)
2026–	Mura	2	(0)

International career^{‡}
2024–2025	Romania U21	3	(0)
- * Club domestic league appearances and goals as of 20 September 2026 ‡ National team caps and goals as of 25 March 2025

Darius Adrian Oroian (born 1 August 2003) is a Romanian professional footballer who plays as a defender for Slovenian PrvaLiga club Mura.

== Club career ==
After two seasons in the Liga II, Oroian joined Liga I side Sepsi OSK, where he made his official debut in the 2023 Supercupa României final win against Farul Constanța on 8 July 2023. He made his Liga I debut for Sepsi OSK against Rapid București on 14 July.

== Career statistics ==
=== Club ===
As of match played 20 September 2026

Appearances and goals by club, season and competition
Club	Season	League			Cupa României		Continental		Other		Total	
Club	Season	Division	Apps	Goals	Apps	Goals	Apps	Goals	Apps	Goals	Apps	Goals
CSA Steaua București	2021–22	Liga II	27	1	0	0	—		—		27	1
CSA Steaua București	2022–23	Liga II	21	0	2	0	—		—		23	0
CSA Steaua București	Total		48	1	2	0	—		—		50	1
Sepsi OSK	2023–24	Liga I	22	0	1	0	0	0	1 (Note: Appearance in Supercupa României)	0	24	0
Sepsi OSK	2024–25	Liga I	23	0	3	0	—		—		26	0
Sepsi OSK	2025–26	Liga II	24	0	3	2	—		—		27	2
Sepsi OSK	Total		69	0	7	2	0	0	1	0	77	2
Mura	2026–27	Slovenian PrvaLiga	2	0	0	0	—		—		2	0
Career total			119	1	9	2	0	0	1	0	129	3

== Honours ==
Sepsi OSK

- Supercupa României: 2023
