= Ovidiu Perianu =

Romanian footballer

Personal information
- Full name: Ovidiu Ioan Perianu
- Date of birth: 16 April 2002 (age 24)
- Place of birth: Bârlad, Romania
- Height: 1.80 m (5 ft 11 in)
- Position: Defensive midfielder

Team information
- Current team: CFR Cluj
- Number: 6

Youth career
- 2012–2013: Viitorul Bârlad
- 2013: Dinamo București
- 2013–2017: Regal Sport București
- 2017–2019: FCSB

Senior career*
Years	Team	Apps	(Gls)
2019–2025	FCSB	37	(0)
2022–2023	→ Botoșani (loan)	12	(0)
2023	→ Chindia Târgoviște (loan)	9	(0)
2023–2024	→ Universitatea Cluj (loan)	2	(0)
2024	→ Gloria Buzău (loan)	14	(3)
2024–2025	→ Unirea Slobozia (loan)	34	(2)
2025–	CFR Cluj	14	(1)

International career^{‡}
2018	Romania U17	5	(0)
2019–2020	Romania U18	7	(0)
2021–2023	Romania U20	13	(0)
2021–2025	Romania U21	10	(0)
2021	Romania Olympic	2	(0)
- * Club domestic league appearances and goals as of 31 October 2026 ‡ National team caps and goals as of 17 June 2025

Ovidiu Ioan Perianu (born 16 April 2002) is a Romanian professional footballer who plays as a defensive midfielder for Liga I club CFR Cluj.

== Club career ==
A product of FCSB's youth academy, Perianu made his debut for the club as a substitute against Alashkert in the UEFA Europa League on 25 July 2019. On 11 August 2019, Perianu made his Liga I debut for FCSB in a 3–1 loss against Voluntari.

== International career ==
Perianu has represented Romania at under-17 level. On 13 August 2019, Perianu made his debut for Romania U18 against Albania.

== Career statistics ==
As of match played 31 October 2026

Appearances and goals by club, season and competition
Club	Season	League			Cupa României		Europe		Other		Total	
Club	Season	Division	Apps	Goals	Apps	Goals	Apps	Goals	Apps	Goals	Apps	Goals
FCSB	2019–20	Liga I	4	0	3	0	1 (Note: Appearance(s) in UEFA Europa League)	0	—		8	0
FCSB	2020–21	Liga I	23	0	1	0	2	0	1 (Note: Appearance in Supercupa României)	0	27	0
FCSB	2021–22	Liga I	9	0	0	0	1 (Note: Appearance in UEFA Europa Conference League)	0	—		10	0
FCSB	2025–26	Liga I	1	0	0	0	2 (Note: Appearances in UEFA Champions League)	0	0	0	3	0
FCSB	Total		37	0	4	0	6	0	1	0	48	0
Botoșani (loan)	2022–23	Liga I	12	0	1	0	—		—		13	0
Chindia Târgoviște (loan)	2022–23	Liga I	9	0	—		—		—		9	0
Universitatea Cluj (loan)	2023–24	Liga I	2	0	1	0	—		—		3	0
Gloria Buzău (loan)	2023–24	Liga II	14	3	—		—		—		14	3
Unirea Slobozia (loan)	2024–25	Liga I	34	2	1	0	—		2 (Note: Appearance in Liga I promotion/relegation play-offs)	0	37	2
CFR Cluj	2025–26	Liga I	3	0	0	0	0	0	—		3	0
CFR Cluj	2026–27	Liga I	11	1	2	0	1	0	—		14	1
CFR Cluj	Total		14	1	2	0	1	0	—		17	1
Career total			122	6	9	0	7	0	3	0	141	6

== Honours ==
FCSB

- Cupa României: 2019–20
- Supercupa României: 2025
