= Ricardo Pădurariu =

Romanian association football player (born 2007)

Personal information
- Full name: Ricardo Alexandru Pădurariu
- Date of birth: 23 May 2007 (age 19)
- Place of birth: Bucharest, Romania
- Height: 1.75 m (5 ft 9 in)
- Position: Left-back

Team information
- Current team: FCSB
- Number: 4

Youth career
- 2019–2025: FCSB

Senior career*
Years	Team	Apps	(Gls)
2024–	FCSB	16	(0)
2025	→ Gloria Bistrița-Năsăud (loan)	11	(0)
2025–2026	→ Corvinul Hunedoara (loan)	31	(2)

International career^{‡}
2022	Romania U15	2	(0)
2022	Romania U16	6	(0)
2023	Romania U17	5	(0)
2024	Romania U18	2	(0)
2025	Romania U19	2	(0)
2026–	Romania U20	2	(0)
2026–	Romania U21	1	(0)
- * Club domestic league appearances and goals as of 22 November 2026 ‡ National team caps and goals as of 17 November 2026

Ricardo Alexandru Pădurariu (born 23 May 2007) is a Romanian professional footballer who plays as a left-back for Liga I club FCSB.

== Club career ==
A left back, he came through the academy at FCSB and despite suffering numerous knee operations professed to the senior squad by the age of 16 years-old. He attended pre-season training camp with the first team squad in June 2023 in the Netherlands. He made his senior debut for the club on 19 May 2024 in Liga I, away at Rapid Bucharest, appearing as a second-half substitute.

== International career ==
He represented Romania at U16 level in 2022. He progressed to the Romanian U17 team in 2023.

== Style of play ==
He has been compared in style to fellow-Romanian full back Andrei Borza.

== Career statistics ==
As of 22 November 2026

Appearances and goals by club, season and competition
Club	Season	League			Cupa României		Europe		Other		Total	
Club	Season	Division	Apps	Goals	Apps	Goals	Apps	Goals	Apps	Goals	Apps	Goals
FCSB	2023–24	Liga I	1	0	—		—		—		1	0
FCSB	2026–27	Liga I	15	0	1	0	1 (Note: Appearances in UEFA Conference League)	0	—		17	0
FCSB	Total		16	0	1	0	1	0	—		18	0
Gloria Bistrița-Năsăud (loan)	2024–25	Liga III	11	0	—		—		0	0	11	0
Corvinul Hunedoara (loan)	2025–26	Liga II	31	2	2	1	—		—		33	3
Career total			58	2	3	1	1	0	0	0	62	3

== Honours ==
FCSB

- Liga I: 2023–24
- Supercupa României: 2024

Gloria Bistrița

- Liga III: 2024–25

Corvinul Hunedoara

- Liga II: 2025–26
