= Sebastian Colțescu =

Romanian football referee

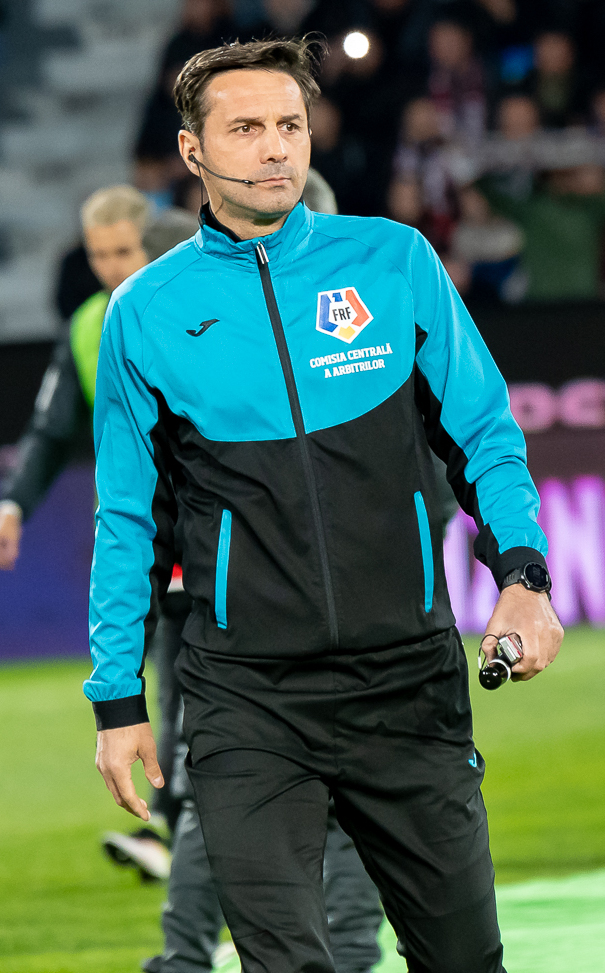
- Colțescu during a Liga I match in 2022
- Full name: Constantin Sebastian Colțescu
- Born: 6 May 1977 (age 49); Craiova, Romania

International
Years	League	Role
2006 – present	FIFA listed	Referee

Constantin Sebastian Colțescu (born 6 May 1977) is a Romanian football referee.

== Career ==
Colțescu was promoted to the Division A in 2003, when he led the match between Oțelul Galați and Gloria Bistrița, on 28 November 2003. In 2006, he was added to the FIFA list and refereed a series of matches in the UEFA Intertoto Cup and the UEFA Cup. He made his debut in the Intertoto Cup in a match between Zrinjski Mostar and Marsaxlokk on 27 July 2006.

In 2007, Colțescu was excluded from the FIFA list and relegated to the Second League in Romania. He managed to return to the country's A referees' corps at the end of 2008.

On 8 December 2020, Colțescu was accused of racism during a UEFA Champions League match between Paris Saint-Germain and İstanbul Başakşehir, after referring to former player Pierre Webó as "negro". UEFA launched an investigation and subsequently cleared Colțescu of charges of racism and discriminatory conduct, but suspended him from refereeing for the remainder of the season for displaying "inappropriate behavior" in the match.
