= 2025 Supercupa României =

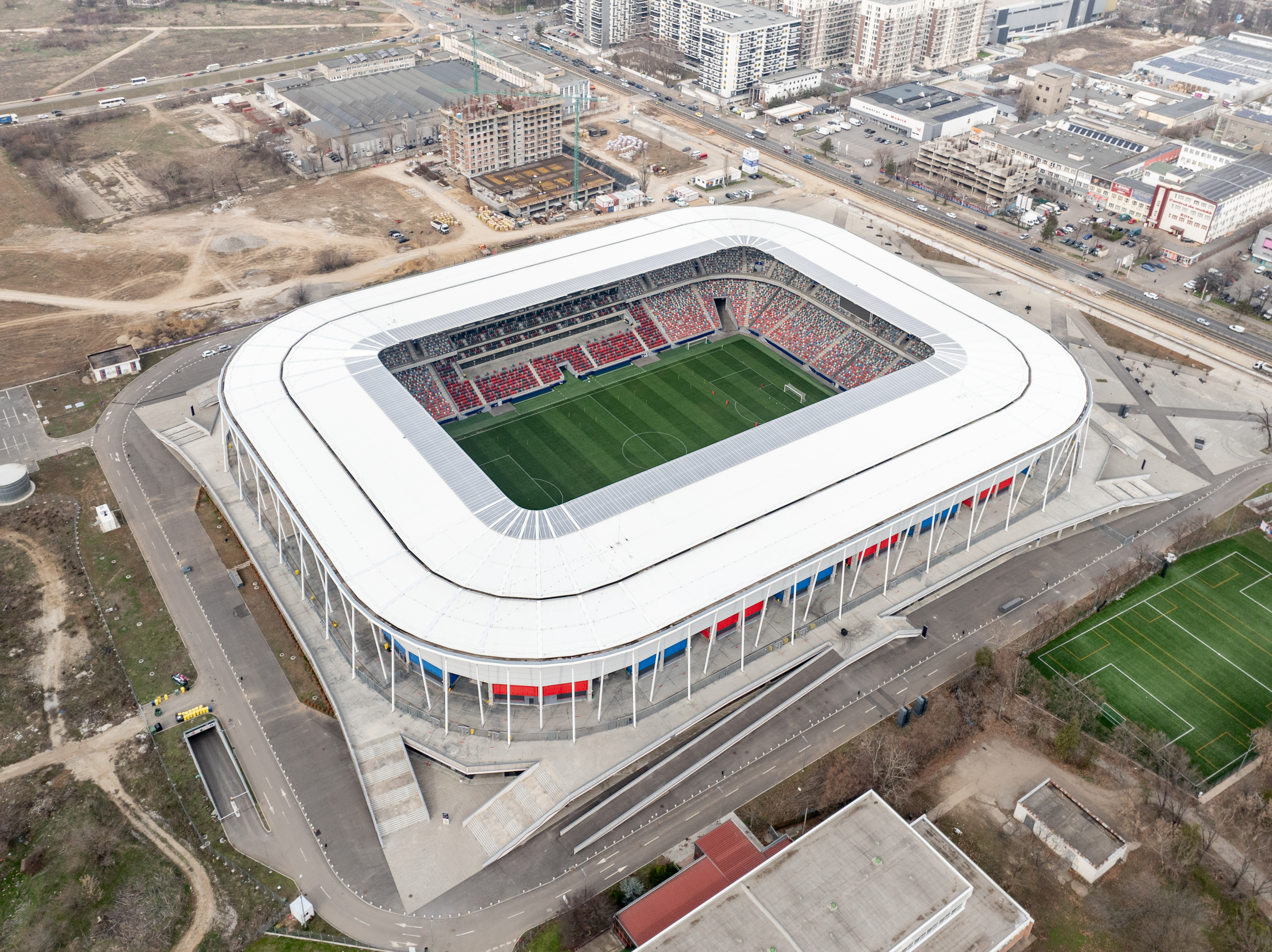
- Event: 2025 Supercupa României
FCSB	CFR Cluj
Liga I	Cupa României
2	1
- Date: 5 July 2025
- Venue: Steaua, Bucharest
- Referee: Marian Barbu
- Attendance: 20,133

The 2025 Supercupa României was the 27th edition of the Supercupa României, an annual football super cup contested by the winners of the previous season's Liga I and Cupa României competitions.

The game featured FCSB and CFR Cluj, and Steaua Stadium in Bucharest hosted the final for the first time on 5 July 2025.

== Teams ==
Team	Qualification	Previous participations (bold indicates winners)
FCSB	Winners of the 2024–25 Liga I	13 (**1994**, **1995**, **1998**, 1999, **2001**, 2005, **2006**, 2011, **2013**, 2014, 2015, 2020, **2024**)
CFR Cluj	Winners of the 2024–25 Cupa României	9 (**2009**, **2010**, 2012, 2016, **2018**, 2019, **2020**, 2021, 2022)

== Match ==
=== Details ===
5 July 2025
20:00 EEST (UTC+03)

FCSB	2–1	CFR Cluj
Politic 48'; Radunović 90+1'	Report	Fică 65'

Steaua, Bucharest
Attendance: 20,133
Referee: Marian Barbu

GK	32	(Romania) Ștefan Târnovanu
RB	23	(Romania) Ionuț Cercel
CB	30	(South Africa) Siyabonga Ngezana
CB	17	(Romania) Mihai Popescu (c)	(substituted off) 78'
LB	33	(Montenegro) Risto Radunović
CDM	27	(Romania) Darius Olaru
CDM	8	(Romania) Adrian Șut	(substituted off) 82'
RW	10	(Romania) Florin Tănase
CAF	11	(Romania) David Miculescu	(substituted off) 46'
LW	31	(Italy) Juri Cisotti	(substituted off) 46'
ST	7	(Romania) Denis Alibec	(substituted off) 10'
Substitutes:
CDM	42	(Ghana) Baba Alhassan	(substituted in) 78'
RB	2	(Romania) Valentin Crețu
CB	21	(Romania) Vlad Chiricheș	(substituted in) 11'
CB	4	(Bosnia and Herzegovina) Daniel Graovac
CDM	16	(Romania) Mihai Lixandru	(substituted in) 82'
LW	20	(Romania) Dennis Politic	(substituted in) 46'
CDM	25	(Romania) Ovidiu Perianu
ST	90	(Romania) Alexandru Stoian
LW	15	(Romania) Marius Ștefănescu	(substituted in) 46'
CAM	22	(Romania) Mihai Toma
LB	29	(Romania) Laurențiu Vlăsceanu
GK	38	(Czech Republic) Lukáš Zima
Manager:
(Cyprus) Elias Charalambous

GK	89	(Romania) Otto Hindrich
RB	3	(Mauritania) Aly Abeid (yellow card) 62'
CB	4	(Brazil) Léo Bolgado
CB	6	(The Gambia) Sheriff Sinyan
LB	45	(Romania) Camora (yellow card) 88'
CDM	18	(Kosovo) Lindon Emërllahu
CDM	88	(Croatia) Damjan Đoković	(substituted off) 61'
RW	77	(Romania) Andres Sfait (c)	(substituted off) 90' (yellow card) 36'
CAM	11	(Romania) Adrian Păun	(substituted off) 61'
LW	7	(Liberia) Mohammed Kamara	(substituted off) 78'
ST	93	(Moldova) Virgiliu Postolachi	(substituted off) 78'
Substitutes:
GK	1	(Romania) Rareș Gal
CB	27	(Romania) Matei Ilie
RW	10	(Romania) Ciprian Deac	(substituted in) 78'
CAM	40	(Romania) Viktor Kun
CAM	8	(Romania) Alin Fică	(substituted in) 61'
CDM	73	(Croatia) Karlo Muhar	(substituted in) 61'
FW	96	(France) Béni Nkololo
FW	98	(Romania) David Ciubăncan	(substituted in) 90'
FW	19	(North Macedonia) Marko Gjorgjievski	(substituted in) 78'
Manager:
(Romania) Dan Petrescu

**MAN OF THE MATCH**

- Dennis Politic

**MATCH OFFICIALS**

- Assistant referees:
  - Valentin Popescu
  - Ionel Dumitru
- Fourth official:
  - Horia Mladinovici
- VAR:
  - Andrei Florin
- Assistant VAR:
  - Viorel Flueran

**MATCH RULES**

- 90 minutes.
- Penalty shoot-out if scores still level.
- Twelve named substitutes.
- Maximum of five substitutions.

== See also ==
- 2025–26 Liga I
- 2025–26 Cupa României
