= Bogdan Rusu =

Romanian footballer

Personal information
- Full name: Bogdan Gheorghe Rusu
- Date of birth: 9 April 1990 (age 36)
- Place of birth: Brașov, Romania
- Height: 1.80 m (5 ft 11 in)
- Position: Striker

Youth career
- 1997–2008: CSȘ Brașovia

Senior career*
Years	Team	Apps	(Gls)
2008–2009	FC Ghimbav		
2009–2010	Aerostar Bacău		
2010	Farul Constanţa	14	(3)
2011–2013	Astra Giurgiu	23	(1)
2011–2013	Astra II Giurgiu	18	(8)
2012–2013	→ CF Brăila (loan)	22	(6)
2013–2015	SC Bacău	45	(12)
2015–2016	FC Brașov	32	(10)
2016–2017	Foresta Suceava	29	(12)
2017–2019	Hermannstadt	53	(18)
2019	→ Petrolul Ploiești (loan)	15	(5)
2019–2020	Dunărea Călărași	24	(9)
2020–2022	Mioveni	64	(20)
2022–2023	FCSB	3	(0)
2023	Mioveni	18	(5)
2023–2024	Argeș Pitești	24	(4)
2024–2026	Râmnicu Vâlcea	10	(11)
- * Club domestic league appearances and goals as of 08:30, 12 November 2024 (UTC)

Bogdan Gheorghe Rusu (born 9 April 1990) is a Romanian professional footballer who plays as a striker. In his career, Rusu also played for teams such as Astra Giurgiu, FC Brașov, FC Hermannstadt, CS Mioveni or FCSB, among others.

== Career statistics ==
As of match played 11 May 2024

Appearances and goals by club, season and competition
Club	Season	League			Cupa României		Continental		Other		Total	
Club	Season	Division	Apps	Goals	Apps	Goals	Apps	Goals	Apps	Goals	Apps	Goals
Farul Constanța	2010–11	Liga II	14	3	0	0	—		—		14	3
Astra Giurgiu	2010–11	Liga I	7	1	0	0	—		—		7	1
Astra Giurgiu	2011–12	Liga I	16	0	1	0	—		—		17	0
Astra Giurgiu	Total		37	4	1	0	—		—		38	4
Astra II Giurgiu	2011–12	Liga II	6	1	0	0	—		—		6	1
Astra II Giurgiu	2012–13	Liga II	12	7	2	0	—		—		14	7
Astra II Giurgiu	Total		18	8	2	0	—		—		20	8
CF Brăila (loan)	2012–13	Liga II	22	6	3	0	—		—		25	6
SC Bacău	2013–14	Liga II	27	4	2	0	—		—		29	4
SC Bacău	2014–15	Liga II	18	8	1	0	—		—		19	8
SC Bacău	Total		67	18	6	0	—		—		73	18
Brașov	2015–16	Liga II	32	10	2	1	—		—		34	11
Foresta Suceava	2016–17	Liga II	29	12	3	0	—		—		32	12
Hermannstadt	2017–18	Liga II	36	18	6	3	—		—		42	21
Hermannstadt	2018–19	Liga I	17	0	0	0	—		—		17	0
Hermannstadt	Total		114	40	11	4	—		—		125	44
Petrolul Ploiești (loan)	2018–19	Liga II	15	5	—		—		—		15	5
Dunărea Călărași	2019–20	Liga II	24	9	0	0	—		—		24	9
Mioveni	2020–21	Liga II	24	9	1	0	—		2 (Note: Appearances in Liga I promotion/relegation play-offs)	0	27	9
Mioveni	2021–22	Liga I	36	9	1	0	—		—		37	9
Mioveni	2022–23	Liga I	20	7	1	0	—		—		21	7
Mioveni	Total		119	39	3	0	—		2	0	124	39
FCSB	2022–23	Liga I	3	0	2	0	8 (Note: Appearances in UEFA Europa Conference League)	0	—		13	0
Argeș Pitești	2023–24	Liga II	24	4	2	1	—		—		26	5
Career total			390	113	27	5	8	0	2	0	419	118

== Honours ==
Hermannstadt

- Cupa României runner-up: 2017–18
