= 2022–23 FCSB season =

FCSB
2022–23 season
- President: Valeriu Argăseală
- Manager: Anton Petrea (until 25 July); Nicolae Dică (until 1 November); Leonard Strizu (until 3 March); Elias Charalambous (from 30 March)
- Stadium: Arena Națională
- SuperLiga: 2nd
- Cupa României: Group stage
- Conference League: Group stage
- Top goalscorer: League: Andrea Compagno (15); All: Andrea Compagno (16)
- Highest home attendance: 42,439 vs CFR Cluj (14 May 2023, SuperLiga)
- Lowest home attendance: 3,173 vs Mioveni (5 December 2022, SuperLiga)
- Average home league attendance: 15,643
Home colours	Away colours	Third colours

The 2022–23 season was FCSB's 75th season since its founding in 1947.

== Previous season positions ==
	Competition	Position
(European Union)	UEFA Europa Conference League	Second qualifying round
(Romania)	Liga I	2nd
(Romania)	Cupa României	Round of 16

== Players ==
=== Current squad ===
As of 12 February 2023

Note: Flags indicate national team as defined under FIFA eligibility rules; some limited exceptions apply. Players may hold more than one non-FIFA nationality.

No.	Pos.	Nation	Player
2	DF	ROU	Valentin Crețu
3	DF	ROU	Ionuț Panțîru
5	DF	CMR	Joyskim Dawa
6	DF	ROU	Denis Haruț
7	FW	ROU	Florinel Coman
8	MF	ROU	Adrian Șut (vice-captain)
10	MF	ROU	Octavian Popescu
11	FW	ROU	David Miculescu
12	GK	ROU	Alexandru Maxim
14	MF	ROU	Matei Tănasă
16	DF	EST	Joonas Tamm
17	DF	ROU	Iulian Cristea
18	MF	FRA	Malcom Edjouma
19	FW	ALG	Billel Omrani

No.	Pos.	Nation	Player
22	MF	ROU	Deian Sorescu (on loan from Raków)
23	MF	ROU	Ovidiu Popescu (4th captain)
24	MF	MKD	Boban Nikolov
26	MF	ROU	Răzvan Oaidă
27	MF	ROU	Darius Olaru (captain)
28	DF	ROU	Alexandru Pantea
32	GK	ROU	Ștefan Târnovanu
33	DF	MNE	Risto Radunović (3rd captain)
77	DF	ROU	Sorin Șerban
80	MF	ROU	Eduard Rădăslăvescu
96	FW	ITA	Andrea Compagno
98	FW	ROU	Andrei Cordea
99	GK	ROU	Andrei Vlad

=== Transfers ===
==== In ====
No.	Pos.	Player	Transferred from	Fee	Date	Source
1	GK	(Romania) Răzvan Ducan	(Romania) Mioveni	Loan Return	30 June 2022	
–	MF	(Romania) Robert Ion	(Romania) Academica Clinceni	Loan Return	30 June 2022	
–	MF	(Romania) Andrei Pandele	(Romania) Metaloglobus București	Loan Return	30 June 2022	
40	DF	(Romania) Ștefan Cană	(Romania) Politehnica Iași	Loan Return	30 June 2022	
15	MF	(Romania) Mihai Lixandru	(Romania) Mioveni	Loan Return	30 June 2022	
28	DF	(Romania) Alexandru Pantea	(Romania) Hermannstadt	Loan Return	30 June 2022	
–	FW	(Romania) Cristian Dumitru	(Romania) Argeș Pitești	Loan Return	30 June 2022	
–	MF	(Romania) Dragos Nedelcu	(Romania) Farul Constanța	Loan Return	30 June 2022	
–	MF	(Romania) Gabriel Simion	(Cyprus) Aris Limassol	Loan Return	30 June 2022	
6	DF	(Romania) Denis Haruț	(Romania) Botoșani	Loan Return	30 June 2022	
29	DF	(Algeria) Rachid Bouhenna	(Romania) CFR Cluj	Free Transfer	1 July 2022	
5	DF	(Cameroon) Joyskim Dawa	(Romania) Botoșani	€350,000	1 July 2022	
16	DF	(Estonia) Joonas Tamm	(Ukraine) Vorskla Poltava	Free Transfer	12 July 2022	
90	FW	(Romania) Bogdan Rusu	(Romania) Mioveni	€200,000	1 August 2022	
11	FW	(Romania) David Miculescu	(Romania) UTA Arad	€1,700,000	1 August 2022	
20	MF	(Romania) Marco Dulca	(Romania) Chindia Targoviște	€250,000	5 August 2022	
22	DF	(Romania) Radu Boboc	(Romania) Farul Constanța	€400,000	5 August 2022	
80	MF	(Romania) Eduard Radaslavescu	(Romania) Farul Constanța	€500,000	5 August 2022	
24	MF	(Moldova) Vadim Rață	(Romania) Voluntari	€300,000	12 August 2022	
96	FW	(Italy) Andrea Compagno	(Romania) FC U Craiova	€1,500,000	29 August 2022	
–	MF	(Romania) Ovidiu Horșia	(Romania) Unirea Constanța	Loan return	31 August 2022	
19	FW	(Algeria) Billel Omrani	(Romania) CFR Cluj	Free transfer	13 September 2022	
24	MF	(North Macedonia) Boban Nikolov	(Moldova) Sheriff Tiraspol	Free transfer	17 September 2022	
29	MF	(Romania) Andrei Pandele	(Romania) Unirea Constanța	Loan return	31 December 2022	
–	FW	(Romania) Cristian Dumitru	(Romania) Mioveni	Loan return	31 December 2022	
25	MF	(Romania) Ovidiu Perianu	(Romania) Botoșani	Loan return	2 January 2023	
22	MF	(Romania) Deian Sorescu	(Poland) Raków	€50,000	14 January 2023	

==== Out ====
No.	Pos.	Player	Transferred to	Fee	Date	Source
55	DF	(Brazil) Paulo Vinícius	Free agent	End of contract	30 June 2022	
28	FW	(Romania) Claudiu Keșerü	(Romania) UTA Arad	End of contract	30 June 2022	
–	MF	(Romania) Dragoș Nedelcu	(Romania) Farul Constanța	End of contract	30 June 2022	
4	DF	(Romania) Andrei Miron	(Israel) Hapoel Haifa	End of contract	30 June 2022	
40	DF	(Romania) Ștefan Cană	(Romania) Unirea Constanța	Loan	1 July 2022	
–	MF	(Romania) Andrei Pandele	(Romania) Unirea Constanța	Loan	1 July 2022	
–	MF	(Romania) Ovidiu Horșia	(Romania) Unirea Constanța	Loan	1 July 2022	
1	GK	(Romania) Cătălin Straton	(Romania) Argeș Pitești	Free	1 July 2022	
–	FW	(Romania) Cristian Dumitru	(Romania) Mioveni	Loan	1 July 2022	
24	MF	(Romania) Robert Ion	(Romania) Farul Constanța	Free	1 July 2022	
22	FW	(Romania) Valentin Gheorghe	(Turkey) Ümraniyespor	Loan	1 July 2022	
25	MF	(Romania) Ovidiu Perianu	(Romania) Botoșani	Loan	13 July 2022	
10	MF	(Romania) Florin Tănase	(United Arab Emirates) Al Jazira	€3M	7 August 2022	
31	FW	(Croatia) Ivan Mamut	Free agent	Released	9 August 2022	
–	MF	(Romania) Gabriel Simion	(Romania) Universitatea Cluj	Free	11 August 2022	
15	MF	(Romania) Mihai Lixandru	(Romania) Mioveni	Loan	12 August 2022	
20	FW	(Romania) Andrei Burlacu	(Romania) Mioveni	Free	26 August 2022	
–	MF	(Romania) Ovidiu Horșia	(Romania) Universitatea Cluj	Loan	1 September 2022	
24	MF	(Moldova) Vadim Rață	(Romania) Voluntari	Undisclosed	6 September 2022	
9	FW	(Romania) Ianis Stoica	(Romania) Universitatea Cluj	Loan	17 December 2022	
30	MF	(Romania) Alexandru Musi	(Romania) Politehnica Iași	Loan	22 December 2022	
13	FW	(Romania) Andrei Dumiter	(Romania) Voluntari	Free	2 January 2023	
25	MF	(Romania) Ovidiu Perianu	(Romania) Chindia Târgoviște	Loan	3 January 2023	
22	DF	(Romania) Radu Boboc	Free agent	Free	5 January 2023	
90	FW	(Romania) Bogdan Rusu	(Romania) Mioveni	Free	14 January 2023	
20	MF	(Romania) Marco Dulca	(Romania) Chindia Târgoviște	Free	18 January 2023	
1	GK	(Romania) Răzvan Ducan	(Romania) Botoșani	Free	20 January 2023	
29	DF	(Algeria) Rachid Bouhenna	(Greece) Ionikos	Free	31 January 2023	
–	FW	(Romania) Cristian Dumitru	Free agent		15 February 2023	
21	DF	(Romania) Florin Achim	Free agent		15 February 2023	

==== Overall transfer activity ====
===== Expenditure =====
Summer:▼€5,200,000

Winter:▼€0,050,000

Total:▼€5,250,000

===== Income =====
Summer: ▲€3,000,000

Winter: €0,000,000

Total:▲€3,000,000

===== Net Totals =====
Summer: ▼€2,200,000

Winter: ▼€0,050,000

Total: ▼€2,250,000

== Friendly matches ==
Win Draw Loss

29 June 2022	FCSB (Romania)	6–0	(Moldova) Sfîntul Gheorghe	Bucharest, Romania
18:00 EEST (UTC+3)	Șut 7'; Cordea 10'; Stoica 28'; Dumiter 57', 90+2'; Mamut 90'	Report		Stadium: Baza Sportivă FCSB

2 July 2022	Zimbru Chișinău (Moldova)	1–6	(Romania) FCSB	Chișinău, Republic of Moldova
20:00 EEST (UTC+3)	Rodrigues 77'	Report	Olaru 10'; Coman 25'; Dawa 61'; Musi 71'; Mamut 80'; Stoica 83'	Stadium: Zimbru Stadium

6 July 2022	FCSB (Romania)	1–0	(Romania) Mioveni	Bucharest, Romania
18:00 EEST (UTC+3)	Stoica 18'	Report		Stadium: Baza Sportivă FCSB

9 July 2022	Oțelul Galați (Romania)	0–1	(Romania) FCSB	Galați, Romania
20:00 EEST (UTC+3)		Report	Coman 67'	Stadium: Stadionul Oțelul

15 January 2023	Pogoń Szczecin (Poland)	2–0	(Romania) FCSB	Belek, Turkey
16:00 EEST (UTC+3)	Fornalczyk 72'; Zahović 83'	Report		Stadium: Regnum Carya Football

16 January 2023	Raków Częstochowa (Poland)	4–1	(Romania) FCSB	Belek, Turkey
16:00 EEST (UTC+3)	Nowak 16'; Gutkovskis 20'; Ivi 26'; Tudor 90'	Report	Omrani 69'	Stadium: Regnum Carya Football

== Competitions ==
Win Draw Loss

=== Overview ===
Competition	First match	Last match	Starting round	Final position	Record							
Competition	First match	Last match	Starting round	Final position	Pld	W	D	L	GF	GA	GD	Win %
SuperLiga	17 July 2022	27 May 2023	Matchday 1	2nd	40	22	8	10	66	50	+16	55.00
Cupa României	19 October 2022	8 December 2022	Group stage	Group stage	3	1	2	0	4	2	+2	33.33
Conference League	21 July 2022	3 November 2022	Second qualifying round	Group stage	12	4	2	6	13	24	−11	33.33
Total					55	27	12	16	83	76	+7	49.09

Last updated: 27 May 2023.
Source: Competitions

=== SuperLiga ===
==== Regular season ====
===== Table =====
Pos	Team	Pld	W	D	L	GF	GA	GD	Pts	Qualification
1	Farul Constanța	30	19	7	4	54	28	+26	64	Qualification for the Play-off round
2	CFR Cluj	30	20	3	7	54	28	+26	63	Qualification for the Play-off round
3	FCSB	30	17	6	7	51	35	+16	57	Qualification for the Play-off round
4	Universitatea Craiova	30	16	6	8	37	27	+10	54	Qualification for the Play-off round
5	Rapid București	30	15	7	8	40	26	+14	52	Qualification for the Play-off round

Source: LPF (in Romanian) Soccerway
Rules for classification: 1) Points; 2) Head-to-head points; 3) Head-to-head goal difference; 4) Head-to-head goals scored; 5) Goal difference; 6) Goals scored; 7) Play-off.

===== Results summary =====
Overall								Home						Away					
Pld	W	D	L	GF	GA	GD	Pts	W	D	L	GF	GA	GD	W	D	L	GF	GA	GD
30	17	6	7	51	35	+16	57	8	5	2	30	18	+12	9	1	5	21	17	+4

Last updated: 12 March 2023 (UTC).
Source: FCSB

===== Position by round =====
Round	1	2	3	4	5	6	7	8	9	10	11	12	13	14	15	16	17	18	19	20	21	22	23	24	25	26	27	28	29	30
Ground	H	A	H	A	H	A	H	A	H	H	A	H	A	H	A	A	H	A	H	A	H	A	H	A	A	H	A	H	A	H
Result	D	L	D	D	W	W	D	L	L	D	L	W	W	W	W	L	W	W	W	W	W	W	L	W	W	D	W	W	L	W
Position	9	14	14	13	12	9	10	12	12	12	13	10	7	6	6	6	6	5	4	4	3	3	4	4	3	3	3	3	3	3

Updated to match(es) played on 12 March 2023 (UTC). Source: Matches
A = Away; H = Home; W = Win; D = Draw; L = Loss

===== Results =====
17 July 2022 1	FCSB	1–1	Universitatea Cluj	Bucharest
21:30 EEST (UTC+03)	Șerban (yellow card) 4'; Crețu (yellow card) 43'; Tănase 55' (pen.); Oaidă (yellow card) 72'		Romário Pires (yellow card) 32'; Bălan 45+4'; Ispas (yellow card) 62'; Gorcea (yellow card) 86'; Hlistei (yellow card) 90+5'	Stadium: Arena Națională; Attendance: 19,237; Referee: Marian Barbu; Assistant referees: Mircea Orbuleţ, Vladimir Urzică; Fourth official: Lucian Rusandu

24 July 2022 2	Rapid București	2–0	FCSB	Bucharest
21:30 EEST (UTC+03)	Dugandžić 19', (yellow card) 59'; Săpunaru (yellow card) 24', (goal) 40'; Moldovan (yellow card) 58'; Crepulja (yellow card) 79'		Radunović (yellow card) 57'; Cordea (yellow card) 81'; Oct. Popescu (yellow card) 88'	Stadium: Superbet Arena; Attendance: 13,500; Referee: István Kovács; Assistant referees: Vasile Marinescu, Ovidiu Artene; Fourth official: Horia Mladinovici

31 July 2022 3	FCSB	1–1	FC U Craiova 1948	Bucharest
22:30 EEST (UTC+03)	Tamm 47'; Dawa (yellow card) 57'; Radunović (yellow card) 63'		Huyghebaert (yellow card) 25'; Asamoah (yellow card) 36'; Achim (yellow card) 41'; Compagno 58' (pen.), (yellow card) 90+6'; Baeten (yellow card) 68'	Stadium: Arena Națională; Attendance: 15,167; Referee: Adrian Cojocaru; Assistant referees: Sebastian Gheorghe, Adrian Vornicu; Fourth official: Andrei Moroiță

6 August 2022 4	Mioveni	1–1	FCSB	Mioveni
19:00 EEST (UTC+03)	Balaur 26', (yellow card) 62'; Burnea (yellow card) 82'		Dawa (yellow card) 53'; Miculescu 79'	Stadium: Orășenesc; Attendance: 6,000; Referee: Szabolcs Kovács; Assistant referees: Florin Danşa, Stelian Slabu; Fourth official: Iulian Dima

14 August 2022 5	FCSB	3–2	Chindia Târgoviște	Bucharest
21:30 EEST (UTC+03)	Cordea 48', 55'; Tamm 59'; Edjouma (yellow card) 78'		Neguț (red card) 7'; Popadiuc 22', (yellow card) 66'; Popa 28'; Mihaiu (yellow card) 85'; Vorobjovas (yellow card) 90+2'	Stadium: Arena Națională; Attendance: 11,108; Referee: Ionuţ Coza; Assistant referees: Cerei Alexandru, Gheorghe Bogdan; Fourth official: Moroiță Andrei

28 August 2022 7	FCSB	2–2	Hermannstadt	Bucharest
21:30 EEST (UTC+03)	Dawa 34'; Rusu (yellow card) 42'; Edjouma 90+2'		Butean 21'; Opruț (yellow card) 46'; Paraschiv 65'	Stadium: Arena Națională; Attendance: 10,872; Referee: Horțiu Feșnic; Assistant referees: Valentin Avram, Alexandru Cerei; Fourth official: Adrian Popescu

31 August 2022 8	Farul Constanța	3–1	FCSB	Ovidiu
22:00 EEST (UTC+03)	Alibec 23' (pen.); Doukouré 45+2'; Băluță (yellow card) 46'; Grameni 77'		Compagno (yellow card) 33', (goal) 70'; Dawa (yellow card) 35'; Coman (yellow card) 35'; Oaidă (yellow card) 90'	Stadium: Viitorul; Attendance: 4,000; Referee: Cătălin Popa; Assistant referees: George Neacşu, Romică Bîrdeş; Fourth official: Andrei Antonie

12 September 2022 10	FCSB	1–1	Voluntari	Bucharest
21:00 EEST (UTC+03)	Edjouma (yellow card) 68' (yellow-red card) 86'; Miculescu 82'		Rață (yellow card) 26'; Costin (yellow card) 45+1'; Nemec 90+7' (pen.)	Stadium: Arena Națională; Attendance: 8,715; Referee: Marcel Bârsan; Assistant referees: Marius Marica, Radu Ghinguleac; Fourth official: Sebastian Colţescu

18 September 2022 11	Universitatea Craiova	2–1	FCSB	Craiova
21:30 EEST (UTC+03)	Mitrea 32' (pen.); Oaidă 66' (o.g.); Căpățînă (yellow card) 88'; Bancu (yellow card) 90+2'		Dawa (yellow card) 12'; Coman (yellow card) 24'; Radunović (yellow card) 26'; Tamm (yellow card) 30'; Compagno 45+6' (pen.); Oct. Popescu (yellow card) 52'; Olaru (yellow card) 87'	Stadium: Ion Oblemenco; Attendance: 21,100; Referee: Radu Petrescu; Assistant referees: Sebastian Gheorghe, Mircea Orbuleţ; Fourth official: Cătălin Popa

2 October 2022 12	FCSB	3–2	Argeș Pitești	Bucharest
21:30 EEST (UTC+03)	Compagno 11', 64' (pen.); Crețu (yellow card) 39'; Coman (yellow card) 74'; Cordea 87'; Oaidă (yellow card) 90+1'		Calcan 5', (yellow card) 62'; Alceus (yellow card) 33'; Dobrosavlevici (yellow card) 61'; Cestor (yellow card) 64'; Garita 79'; Șerban (yellow card) 90+5'	Stadium: Arena Națională; Attendance: 9,542; Referee: George Găman; Assistant referees: Adrian Popescu, Imre-Laszlo Bucsi; Fourth official: Viorel Flueran

9 October 2022 13	Petrolul Ploiești	0–2	FCSB	Ploiești
21:30 EEST (UTC+03)			Dawa 45+2'; Coman 47'; Târnovanu (yellow card) 78'	Stadium: Ilie Oană; Attendance: 13,500; Referee: Horațiu Feșnic; Assistant referees: Valentin Avram, Alexandru Cerei; Fourth official: Iulian Dima

16 October 2022 14	FCSB	2–1	UTA Arad	Bucharest
20:30 EEST (UTC+03)	Pantea (yellow card) 3'; Olaru 16'; Nikolov (yellow card) 86'; Compagno 88' (pen.); Cordea (yellow card) 90+1'		Cascini (yellow card) 45+2'; Benga (yellow card) 67'; Keșerü 90+1'	Stadium: Arena Națională; Attendance: 7,234; Referee: Sebastian Colțescu; Assistant referees: Daniel Mitruţi, Ferencz Tunyogi; Fourth official: Iulian Dima

24 October 2022 15	Sepsi OSK	0–1	FCSB	Sfântu Gheorghe
21:00 EEST (UTC+03)	Păun (yellow card) 6'; Tudorie (penalty missed) 27'; Niňaj (yellow card) 64'; Ciobotariu (yellow card) 86'		Dawa (yellow card) 26'; Compagno 51' (pen.); Oaidă (yellow card) 79'; Crețu (yellow card) 90+1'	Stadium: Sepsi Arena; Attendance: 8,000; Referee: Marcel Bârsan; Assistant referees: Vladimir Urzică, Adrian Vornicu; Fourth official: Iulian Călin

31 October 2022 16	Universitatea Cluj	2–1	FCSB	Cluj-Napoca
21:00 EET (UTC+02)	Romário Pires (yellow card) 19' (red card) 57'; Thiam 32'; Filip 40'		Tamm (yellow card) 81'; Cordea 86'	Stadium: Cluj Arena; Attendance: 17,500; Referee: István Kovács; Assistant referees: Vasile Marinescu, Ovidiu Artene; Fourth official: Viorel Flueran

6 November 2022 17	FCSB	3–1	Rapid București	Bucharest
21:00 EET (UTC+02)	Cordea 14'; Compagno 29'; Oct. Popescu 57'; Crețu (yellow card) 74'		Júnior Morais (yellow card) 68' (red card) 70'; Dugandžić 76' (pen.)	Stadium: Arena Națională; Attendance: 31,233; Referee: Sebastian Colțescu; Assistant referees: Daniel Mitruţi, George Neacşu; Fourth official: Andrei Chivulete

13 November 2022 18	FC U Craiova 1948	0–2	FCSB	Craiova
21:00 EET (UTC+02)	Huyghebaert (yellow card) 81'		Oct. Popescu 4'; Dawa 26'; Oaidă (yellow card) 79'	Stadium: Ion Oblemenco; Attendance: 9,480; Referee: Radu Petrescu; Assistant referees: Mircea Grigoriu, Mihai Marica; Fourth official: Iulian Dima

1 December 2022 6	Botoșani	2–3	FCSB	Botoșani
19:00 EET (UTC+02)	Mailat 13', 66'		Compagno (yellow card) 11', (goal) 30'; Tamm 21'; Olaru (yellow card) 27'; Edjouma 73'; Pantea (yellow card) 82'	Stadium: Municipal; Attendance: 5,500; Referee: George Găman; Assistant referees: Daniel Mitruţi, Marius Marchidanu; Fourth official: Florin Andrei
Note: Originally scheduled for 21 August, the fixture was postponed due to FCSB's participation in the UEFA Europa Conference League Play-offs.

5 December 2022 19	FCSB	5–1	Mioveni	Bucharest
19:00 EET (UTC+02)	Edjouma 31'; Dawa (yellow card) 34'; Șut 45', 77'; Oct. Popescu (yellow card) 45+2'; Coman 58'; Rădăslăvescu 87'		Antal 74'	Stadium: Arena Națională; Attendance: 3,173; Referee: Florin Andrei; Assistant referees: Vladimir Urzică, Alexandru Vodă; Fourth official: Ionuţ Coza

11 December 2022 20	Chindia Târgoviște	0–2	FCSB	Ploiești
20:30 EET (UTC+02)	Obiang (yellow card) 23'; Neguț (yellow card) 40'; Popadiuc (yellow card) 57'; Celea (yellow card) 86'		Radunović 24' (pen.); Miculescu (yellow card) 41'; Cordea (yellow card) 54'; Omrani 73'	Stadium: Ilie Oană; Attendance: 3,000; Referee: Horațiu Feșnic; Assistant referees: Sebastian Gheorghe, Alexandru Cerei; Fourth official: Andrei Antonie

15 December 2022 9	FCSB	0–1	CFR Cluj	Bucharest
20:00 EET (UTC+02)			Burcă (yellow card) 26'; Janga 69'; Petrila (yellow card) 72'; Scuffet (yellow card) 90+5'	Stadium: Arena Națională; Attendance: 14,000; Referee: István Kovács; Assistant referees: Vasile Marinescu, Ovidiu Artene; Fourth official: Marcel Bîrsan
Note: Originally scheduled for 4 September, the fixture was postponed due to both teams' participation in the UEFA Europa Conference League Group stage.

19 December 2022 21	FCSB	1–0	Botoșani	Bucharest
20:00 EET (UTC+02)	Coman 78'; Șut (yellow card) 82'		Sadiku (yellow card) 57' (yellow-red card) 81'	Stadium: Arena Națională; Attendance: 3,743; Referee: Iulian Călin; Assistant referees: Daniel Mitruţi, Romică Bîrdeş; Fourth official: Adrian Cojocaru

22 January 2023 22	Hermannstadt	0–1	FCSB	Sibiu
20:45 EET (UTC+02)	Paraschiv (yellow card) 90+3'		Șut (yellow card) 60'; Radunović (yellow card) 73'; Omrani 75'	Stadium: Municipal; Attendance: 10,610; Referee: Adrian Cojocaru; Assistant referees: George Neacşu, Imre-Laszlo Bucsi; Fourth official: Ionuţ Coza

29 January 2023 23	FCSB	2–3	Farul Constanța	Bucharest
19:00 EET (UTC+02)	Cordea 47'; Compagno (yellow card) 53', (goal) 59' (pen.); Olaru (yellow card) 69'; Omrani (yellow card) 75'; Pantea (yellow card) 81'; Dawa (red card) 90'; Miculescu (yellow card) 90+4'; Târnovanu (yellow card) 90+5'; Coman (yellow card) 90+6'		Grameni (yellow card) 4'; Alibec (yellow card) 22', (goal) 56'; Nedelcu (yellow card) 28'; Popescu (yellow card) 58'; Omrani 90+5' (o.g.); Borza 90+6'; Mazilu (yellow card) 90+8'	Stadium: Arena Națională; Attendance: 10,320; Referee: Horațiu Feșnic; Assistant referees: Valentin Avram, Alexandru Cerei; Fourth official: Horia Mladinovici

5 February 2023 24	CFR Cluj	0–1	FCSB	Cluj-Napoca
21:00 EET (UTC+02)	Krasniqi (yellow card) 39'; Manea (yellow card) 81'		Compagno (yellow card) 2'; Miculescu (yellow card) 69'; Edjouma 88'; Oct. Popescu (yellow card) 90+4'; Târnovanu (yellow card) 90+8'	Stadium: Dr. Constantin Rădulescu; Attendance: 9,960; Referee: Sebastian Colțescu; Assistant referees: Daniel Mitruţi, George Neacşu; Fourth official: Andrei Moroiță

12 February 2023 25	Voluntari	1–2	FCSB	Voluntari
20:00 EET (UTC+02)	Răduț (yellow card) 24'; U. Meleke (yellow card) 26'; Vlad (yellow card) 55'; Marcelo Lopes 90'		Edjouma 45', 79', (yellow card) 82'; Radunović (yellow card) 78'; Olaru (yellow card) 90+5'	Stadium: Anghel Iordănescu; Attendance: 1,500; Referee: Radu Petrescu; Assistant referees: Radu Ghinguleac, Mircea Grigoriu; Fourth official: Lucian Rusandu

19 February 2023 26	FCSB	1–1	Universitatea Craiova	Bucharest
20:00 EET (UTC+02)	Edjouma 1'; Cordea (yellow card) 32'; Oct. Popescu (yellow card) 33'; Miculescu (yellow card) 60'		Raúl Silva (yellow card) 6'; Vătăjelu (yellow card) 51'; Koljić 90+1'	Stadium: Arena Națională; Attendance: 23,427; Referee: Adrian Cojocaru; Assistant referees: George Neacşu, Bogdan Gheorghe; Fourth official: Iulian Dima

26 February 2023 27	Argeș Pitești	1–2	FCSB	Pitești
20:30 EET (UTC+02)	Turda (yellow card) 44'; Koubemba 62'		Sorescu (yellow card) 21', (goal) 54'; Șut 48'	Stadium: Nicolae Dobrin; Attendance: 7,500; Referee: Marcel Bârsan; Assistant referees: Ovidiu Artene, Mihai Marica; Fourth official: Rareș Vidican

2 March 2023 28	FCSB	4–1	Petrolul Ploiești	Bucharest
20:00 EET (UTC+02)	Șut 5'; Compagno 29' (pen.), 57', (yellow card) 70'; Edjouma 87'		Félix Mathaus 9'; Borța (yellow card) 34'; Purtić (yellow card) 60'	Stadium: Arena Națională; Attendance: 11,235; Referee: Ionuţ Coza; Assistant referees: Radu Ghinguleac, Romică Bîrdeş; Fourth official: Iuliana Demetrescu

5 March 2023 29	UTA Arad	3–1	FCSB	Arad
21:00 EET (UTC+02)	Tamm 14' (o.g.); Pop (yellow card) 25'; Postolachi 64'; Cascini (yellow card) 65'; Ubbink (yellow card) 70', (goal) 78'		Coman 18'; Miculescu (yellow card) 45+2'; Cordea (yellow card) 70'; Sorescu (yellow card) 72'	Stadium: Francisc von Neuman; Attendance: 10,000; Referee: Andrei Chivulete; Assistant referees: Daniel Mitruţi, Alexandru Cerei; Fourth official: Florin Andrei

12 March 2023 30	FCSB	1–0	Sepsi OSK	Bucharest
21:00 EET (UTC+02)	Oct. Popescu 21'		Ciobotariu (yellow card) 2'; Gheorghe (yellow card) 35'; Niňaj (yellow card) 82'	Stadium: Arena Națională; Attendance: 10,614; Referee: Horațiu Feșnic; Assistant referees: Ciprian Danşa, Adrian Vornicu; Fourth official: Florin Andrei

==== Championship round ====
===== Table =====
Pos	Team	Pld	W	D	L	GF	GA	GD	Pts	Qualification
1	Farul Constanța (C)	10	6	3	1	22	13	+9	53	Qualification to Champions League first qualifying round
2	FCSB	10	5	2	3	15	15	0	46	Qualification to Europa Conference League second qualifying round
3	CFR Cluj (O)	10	2	4	4	11	14	−3	42	Qualification to European competition play-offs
4	Universitatea Craiova	10	3	4	3	15	14	+1	40	
5	Rapid București	10	3	3	4	17	20	−3	38	
6	Sepsi OSK (Note: Cup winner)	10	2	2	6	10	14	−4	29	Qualification to Europa Conference League second qualifying round

Source: Soccerway, FRF (in Romanian), LPF (in Romanian)
Rules for classification: 1) Points; 2) Points without rounding; 3) Head-to-head points; 4) Head-to-head goal difference; 5) Head-to-head goals scored; 6) Goal difference; 7) Goals scored; 8) Play-off (only if needed to decide champion or teams for UEFA competitions). (Note: only criteria 6 and 7 are applied to establish the classification during the competition.)
(C) Champions; (O) Play-off winners

==== Championship round results summary ====
Overall								Home						Away					
Pld	W	D	L	GF	GA	GD	Pts	W	D	L	GF	GA	GD	W	D	L	GF	GA	GD
10	5	2	3	15	15	0	17	3	1	1	8	8	0	2	1	2	7	7	0

Last updated: 27 May 2023.

==== Championship round position by round ====
Round	1	2	3	4	5	6	7	8	9	10
Ground	H	A	A	H	A	A	H	H	A	H
Result	D	W	D	W	L	W	W	W	L	L
Position	3	3	3	3	3	2	2	2	2	2

Updated to match(es) played on 27 May 2023. Source:
A = Away; H = Home; W = Win; D = Draw; L = Loss

==== Matches ====
18 March 2023 1	FCSB	1–1	Universitatea Craiova	Bucharest
20:00 EET (UTC+02)	Edjouma (yellow card) 59', (goal) 66'		Marković 32'; Baiaram (yellow card) 44'	Stadium: Arena Națională; Attendance: 20,121; Referee: Florin Andrei; Assistant referees: Sebastian Gheorghe, Mihai Marica; Fourth official: Iulian Dima

2 April 2023 2	Sepsi OSK	1–2	FCSB	Sfântu Gheorghe
20:30 EEST (UTC+03)	Ștefănescu 6'; Gheorghe (yellow card) 90+3'; Aganović (yellow card) 90+8'		Compagno 8'; Coman 19', (yellow card) 21'	Stadium: Sepsi Arena; Attendance: 3,500; Referee: Sebastian Colțescu; Assistant referees: Ciprian Danşa, Daniel Mitruţi; Fourth official: Andrei Antonie

9 April 2023 3	CFR Cluj	1–1	FCSB	Cluj-Napoca
21:00 EEST (UTC+03)	Bîrligea 19'; Muhar (yellow card) 26'; Bordeianu (yellow card) 88'		Cristea (yellow card) 49'; Dawa (yellow card) 63'; Coman 68'; Olaru (yellow card) 90'	Stadium: Dr. Constantin Rădulescu; Attendance: 14,000; Referee: Radu Petrescu; Assistant referees: Radu Ghinguleac, Mircea Grigoriu; Fourth official: Iulian Dima

17 April 2023 4	FCSB	2–1	Farul Constanța	Bucharest
20:30 EEST (UTC+03)	Sorescu (yellow card) 17'; Compagno 35' (pen.); Coman 47'; Cordea (yellow card) 90+3'		Nedelcu (yellow card) 9'; Boli (yellow card) 29'; Sali 51'	Stadium: Arena Națională; Attendance: 27,772; Referee: István Kovács; Assistant referees: Vasile Marinescu, Ovidiu Artene; Fourth official: Ionuţ Coza

23 April 2023 5	Rapid București	1–0	FCSB	Bucharest
20:30 EEST (UTC+03)	Onea (yellow card) 4'; Albu 21'; Grigore (yellow card) 28'; Al. Ioniță (yellow card) 44'; Ștefan (yellow card) 88'		Omrani (yellow card) 4'; Dawa (yellow card) 18'; Radunović (yellow card) 85'	Stadium: Superbet Arena; Attendance: 12,600; Referee: Horațiu Feșnic; Assistant referees: Valentin Avram, Alexandru Cerei; Fourth official: Bogdan Dumitrache

30 April 2023 6	Universitatea Craiova	1–2	FCSB	Craiova
21:00 EEST (UTC+03)	Raúl Silva (yellow card) 55'; Zajkov (yellow card) 74'; Koljić (yellow card) 80', (goal) 90+4' (pen.); Ivan (penalty missed) 82'		Compagno (yellow card) 20', (goal) 44'; Miculescu (yellow card) 38'; Sorescu (yellow card) 72', (goal) 84'; Pantea (yellow card) 78'; Cristea (yellow card) 79'; Radunović (yellow card) 80'; Dawa (yellow card) 90+3'	Stadium: Ion Oblemenco; Attendance: 29,588; Referee: István Kovács; Assistant referees: Vasile Marinescu, Ovidiu Artene; Fourth official: Marian Barbu

8 May 2023 7	FCSB	3–1	Sepsi OSK	Bucharest
21:00 EEST (UTC+03)	Miculescu 28'; Radunović (yellow card) 31', (penalty missed) 45+4'; Șut (yellow card) 55'; Ov. Popescu 74'; Cordea 79'		Bălașa (yellow card) 21'; Niczuly (yellow card) 45+2'; Ciobotariu (yellow card) 63'; Tudorie 67'	Stadium: Arena Națională; Attendance: 13,475; Referee: Marcel Bârsan; Assistant referees: Sebastian Gheorghe, Radu Ghinguleac; Fourth official: Cătălin Busi

14 May 2023 8	FCSB	1–0	CFR Cluj	Bucharest
21:00 EEST (UTC+03)	Coman 49', (yellow card) 50'; Tamm (yellow card) 71'; Pantea (yellow card) 90+1'		Yeboah (yellow card) 45+2'; Janga (yellow card) 71'; Cvek (yellow card) 90+3'	Stadium: Arena Națională; Attendance: 42,439; Referee: Sebastian Colțescu; Assistant referees: Daniel Mitruţi, George Neacşu; Fourth official: Adrian Cojocaru

21 May 2023 9	Farul Constanța	3–2	FCSB	Ovidiu
21:00 EEST (UTC+03)	Mateus Santos 42'; Băluță 58', (yellow card) 88'; Nedelcu (yellow card) 61'; Munteanu 86'; Larie (yellow card) 87'; Sîrbu (yellow card) 89'; Casap (yellow card) 90+1'; Morar (yellow card) 90+7'		Șut 8'; Compagno 18'; Tamm (yellow card) 30'	Stadium: Viitorul; Attendance: 4,488; Referee: Radu Petrescu; Assistant referees: Mircea Grigoriu, Mihai Marica; Fourth official: Marian Barbu

27 May 2023 10	FCSB	1–5	Rapid București	Bucharest
20:30 EEST (UTC+03)	Radunović (yellow card) 45+3'; Oct. Popescu 58', (red card) 63'; Omrani (yellow card) 77'		Luckassen 7', (yellow card) 45+2'; Pănoiu 17'; Iacob 26'; Bamgboye 68', 79'; Albu (yellow card) 76'; Ștefan (yellow card) 77'	Stadium: Arena Națională; Attendance: 19,427; Referee: Sebastian Colțescu; Assistant referees: Daniel Mitruţi, Bogdan Gheorghe; Fourth official: Viorel Flueran

=== Cupa României ===
==== Group stage ====
Pos	Team	Pld	W	D	L	GF	GA	GD	Pts	Qualification	UTA	MIO	FCS	BOT	GBZ	OTE
1	UTA Arad (1)	3	2	1	0	8	3	+5	7	Qualification for quarter-finals	—	—	2–2	—	—	—
2	CS Mioveni (1)	3	2	0	1	2	3	−1	6	Qualification for quarter-finals	0–3	—	—	1–0	—	—
3	FCSB (1)	3	1	2	0	4	2	+2	5		—	—	—	—	—	—
4	FC Botoșani (1)	3	1	0	2	1	3	−2	3		—	—	0–2	—	—	—
5	Gloria Buzău (2)	3	1	0	2	3	4	−1	3		1–3	—	—	0–1	—	—
6	Oțelul Galați (2)	3	0	1	2	0	3	−3	1		—	0–1	0–0	—	0–2	—

Source: FRF
Legend: Blue = home team win; Yellow = draw; Red = away team win.

==== Results ====
19 October 2022 1	UTA Arad	2–2	FCSB	Arad
21:00 EEST (UTC+03)	Pop 8'; Stahl (yellow card) 11'; Batha (yellow card) 11'; Hoxhallari (yellow card) 21'; Benga (yellow card) 80'; Chindriș (yellow card) 87' (yellow-red card) 87'; Postolachi 90+6'		Radunović (yellow card) 11' (yellow-red card) 90+1', (goal) 22' (pen.); Oct. Popescu (yellow card) 11' (yellow-red card) 90+4'; Rădăslăvescu 48'; Miculescu (yellow card) 61'; Bouhenna (yellow card) 83' (yellow-red card) 83'; Boboc (yellow card) 90'	Stadium: Francisc von Neuman; Attendance: 10,800; Referee: Adrian Cojocaru; Assistant referees: Ciprian Danşa, George Neacşu; Fourth official: Rareș Vidican

10 November 2022 2	Oțelul Galați	0–0	FCSB	Galați
21:00 EET (UTC+02)	Sîrghi (yellow card) 10'; Panait (yellow card) 28'; Farcaș (yellow card) 48'; Cisotti (yellow card) 51'; Adăscăliței (yellow card) 90+7'		Dulca (yellow card) 9'; Nikolov (yellow card) 52'; Haruț (yellow card) 57'; Coman (yellow card) 90+4'	Stadium: Oțelul; Attendance: 13,000; Referee: Rareș Vidican; Assistant referees: George Duță, Mihăiță Necula; Fourth official: Sergiu Mavriche

8 December 2022 3	Botoșani	0–2	FCSB	Botoșani
20:00 EET (UTC+02)	Mailat (yellow card) 58'		Musi 53'; Tănasă 90'	Stadium: Municipal; Attendance: 676; Referee: Marian Barbu; Assistant referees: Daniel Mitruţiâ, Stelian Slabu; Fourth official: Iulian Călin

=== UEFA Europa Conference League ===
==== Qualifying rounds ====
===== Second qualifying round =====
21 July 2022 First leg	Saburtalo Tbilisi (Georgia (country))	1–0	(Romania) FCSB	Tbilisi, Georgia
19:00 EEST (UTC+03)	Nonikashvili 41'; Goshteliani (yellow card) 89'	Report	Olaru (yellow card) 22'; Oct. Popescu (yellow card) 33'; Ov. Popescu (yellow card) 64'; Haruț (yellow card) 75'	Stadium: Boris Paichadze Dinamo Arena; Attendance: 4,500; Referee: Kai Erik Steen (Norway); Assistant referees: Tom Harald Grønevik, Øystein Ytterland; Fourth official: Mohammad Usman Aslam

28 July 2022 Second leg	FCSB (Romania)	4–2 (4–3 agg.)	(Georgia (country)) Saburtalo Tbilisi	Bucharest, Romania
20:30 EEST (UTC+03)	Coman (yellow card) 6', (goal) 80'; Olaru (yellow card) 32'; Dawa 44'; Edjouma 55'; Radunović 87' (pen.); Oct. Popescu (yellow card) 90+3'; Cordea (red card) 90+4'	Report	Nonikashvili (yellow card) 30'; Sikharulidze 69'; Tabatadze 78'; Goshteliani (yellow card) 80'; Jinjolava (yellow card) 86'; Chaduneli (yellow card) 90+3'	Stadium: Arena Națională; Attendance: 25,228; Referee: Jonathan Lardot (Belgium); Assistant referees: Florian Lemaire, Romain Devillers; Fourth official: Jasper Vergoote

===== Third qualifying round =====
3 August 2022 First leg	DAC Dunajská Streda (Slovakia)	0–1	(Romania) FCSB	Dunajská Streda, Slovakia
21:30 EEST (UTC+03)	Risvanis (yellow card) 22'; Kružliak (yellow card) 56' (red card) 67'; Kalmár (yellow card) 90+6'	Report	Dawa (yellow card) 2'; Radunović (yellow card) 56'; Edjouma (yellow card) 62'; Tamm 69', (yellow card) 73'	Stadium: MOL Aréna; Attendance: 8,424; Referee: Rade Obrenovič (Slovenia); Assistant referees: Jure Praprotnik, Grega Kordež; Fourth official: Asmir Sagrković

12 August 2022 Second leg	FCSB (Romania)	1–0 (2–0 agg.)	(Slovakia) DAC Dunajská Streda	Bucharest, Romania
20:30 EEST (UTC+03)	Cordea 28'; Șut (yellow card) 86'	First leg	Dimun (yellow card) 78'	Stadium: Arena Națională; Attendance: 40,457; Referee: Aliyar Aghayev (Azerbaijan); Assistant referees: Zeynal Zeynalov, Akif Amirali; Fourth official: Elchin Masiyev

===== Play-off round =====
18 August 2022 First leg	FCSB (Romania)	1–2	(Norway) Viking	Bucharest, Romania
21:30 EEST (UTC+03)	Coman 3'; Tamm (yellow card) 80'; Stoica (yellow card) 90+4'; Olaru (yellow card) 90+5'	Report	Kabran 5'; Bjørshol 35'; Løkberg (yellow card) 57'; Friðjónsson (yellow card) 76'	Stadium: Arena Națională; Attendance: 30,134; Referee: Giorgi Kruashvili (Georgia); Assistant referees: Levan Varamishvili, Zaza Pipia; Fourth official: Davit Kharitonashvili

25 August 2022 Second leg	Viking (Norway)	1–3 (3–4 agg.)	(Romania) FCSB	Stavanger, Norway
20:00 EEST (UTC+03)	Tripić 26' (pen.), (yellow card) 45+1'; Pattynama (yellow card) 31'; Vevatne (yellow card) 86'; Bjørshol (yellow card) 90+3'	Report	Edjouma 2', (yellow card) 16'; Oct. Popescu (yellow card) 24'; Coman (yellow card) 28'; Tamm (yellow card) 45+1'; Cordea 54'; Radunović 90+4' (pen.)	Stadium: Viking Stadion; Attendance: 14,104; Referee: Tamás Bognár (Hungary); Assistant referees: Balázs Buzás, Péter Kóbor; Fourth official: Balázs Berke

==== Group stage ====
Pos	Team	Pld	W	D	L	GF	GA	GD	Pts	Qualification	WHU	AND	SIL	FCSB
1	(England) West Ham United	6	6	0	0	13	4	+9	18	Advance to round of 16	—	2–1	1–0	3–1
2	(Belgium) Anderlecht	6	2	2	2	6	5	+1	8	Advance to knockout round play-offs	0–1	—	1–0	2–2
3	(Denmark) Silkeborg	6	2	0	4	12	7	+5	6		2–3	0–2	—	5–0
4	(Romania) FCSB	6	0	2	4	3	18	−15	2		0–3	0–0	0–5	—

Source: UEFA
Rules for classification: Group stage tiebreakers

===== Results =====
8 September 2022 1	West Ham United (England)	3–1	(Romania) FCSB	London, England
22:00 EEST (UTC+03)	Cornet (yellow card) 39'; Ogbonna (yellow card) 47'; Emerson (yellow card) 54', (goal) 74'; Bowen 69' (pen.); Antonio 90'	Report	Cordea 34'; Dawa (yellow card) 61'; Târnovanu (yellow card) 66'; Oaidă (yellow card) 82'	Stadium: London Stadium; Attendance: 33,312; Referee: Benoît Bastien (France); Assistant referees: Hicham Zakrani, Aurélien Berthomieu; Fourth official: Jérémie Pignard

15 September 2022 2	FCSB (Romania)	0–0	(Belgium) Anderlecht	Bucharest, Romania
22:00 EEST (UTC+03)	Miculescu (yellow card) 19'; Olaru (yellow card) 30'; Compagno (yellow card) 90+1'	Report	Kana (yellow card) 9'; Murillo (yellow card) 32'	Stadium: Arena Națională; Attendance: 29,613; Referee: Sebastian Gishamer (Austria); Assistant referees: Roland Riedel, Santino Schreiner; Fourth official: Christopher Jaeger

6 October 2022 3	Silkeborg (Denmark)	5–0	(Romania) FCSB	Silkeborg, Denmark
19:45 EEST (UTC+03)	Klynge 3'; Kusk 7'; Helenius 35' (pen.); Þórðarson 58'; Adamsen 71'	Report	Dulca (yellow card) 15'; Miculescu (yellow card) 34'; Oct. Popescu (yellow card) 64'	Stadium: Silkeborg Stadium; Attendance: 5,945; Referee: Mykola Balakin (Ukraine); Assistant referees: Viktor Nyzhnyk, Oleksandr Korniyko; Fourth official: Yaroslav Kozyk

13 October 2022 4	FCSB (Romania)	0–5	(Denmark) Silkeborg	Bucharest, Romania
22:00 EEST (UTC+03)	Crețu (yellow card) 37'; Cordea (yellow card) 68'; Olaru (yellow card) 72'	Report	Kusk 12'; Klynge 16'; Tengstedt 63'; Jørgensen 68', 70'; Brink (yellow card) 73'	Stadium: Arena Națională; Attendance: 9,103; Referee: Nick Walsh (Scotland); Assistant referees: Graeme Stewart, Calum Spence; Fourth official: Alan Muir

27 October 2022 5	Anderlecht (Belgium)	2–2	(Romania) FCSB	Brussels, Belgium
19:45 EEST (UTC+03)	Verschaeren 38'; Murillo (yellow card) 43' (yellow-red card) 90+4'; Vertonghen 75'; Hoedt (yellow card) 88'	Report	Compagno 60', (yellow card) 67'; Dawa 82'; Coman (yellow card) 88'; Miculescu (yellow card) 89'	Stadium: Constant Vanden Stock Stadium; Attendance: 14,226; Referee: Manfredas Lukjančukas (Lithuania); Assistant referees: Vytenis Kazlauskas, Mangirdas Mirauskas; Fourth official: Robertas Šmitas

3 November 2022 6	FCSB (Romania)	0–3	(England) West Ham United	Bucharest, Romania
22:00 EET (UTC+02)		Report	Aguerd (yellow card) 32'; Fornals 40', 65'; Dawa 56' (o.g.); Mubama (yellow card) 71'; Scarles (yellow card) 73'	Stadium: Arena Națională; Attendance: 20,172; Referee: Sascha Stegemann (Germany); Assistant referees: Marco Achmüller, Christof Günsch; Fourth official: Florian Badstübner

== Statistics ==
=== Goalscorers ===
As of 27 May 2023

Rank	Position	Name	Liga I	Cupa României	Europa Conference League	Total
1	FW	(Italy) Andrea Compagno	15	0	1	16
2	MF	(France) Malcom Edjouma	9	0	2	11
3	FW	(Romania) Florinel Coman	8	0	2	10
3	FW	(Romania) Andrei Cordea	7	0	3	10
5	MF	(Romania) Adrian Șut	5	0	0	5
5	DF	(Cameroon) Joyskim Dawa	3	0	2	5
7	MF	(Romania) Octavian Popescu	4	0	0	4
7	DF	(Estonia) Joonas Tamm	3	0	1	4
7	DF	(Montenegro) Risto Radunović	1	1	2	4
10	FW	(Romania) David Miculescu	3	0	0	3
11	FW	(Algeria) Billel Omrani	2	0	0	2
11	MF	(Romania) Deian Sorescu	2	0	0	2
11	MF	(Romania) Eduard Rădăslăvescu	1	1	0	2
14	MF	(Romania) Florin Tănase	1	0	0	1
14	MF	(Romania) Darius Olaru	1	0	0	1
14	MF	(Romania) Ovidiu Popescu	1	0	0	1
14	MF	(Romania) Alexandru Musi	0	1	0	1

=== Goal minutes ===
	1'–15'	16'–30'	31'–HT	46'–60'	61'–75'	76'–FT	Extra time	Forfeit
Goals	9	14	10	22	10	18	0	0
Percentage	10.84%	16.87%	12.05%	26.51%	12.05%	21.69%	0%	0%

Last updated: 27 May 2023 (UTC)
Source: FCSB (in Romanian)

=== Hat-tricks ===
Player	Against	Result	Date	Competition

=== Clean sheets ===
As of 27 May 2023

Rank	Name	Liga I	Cupa României	Europa Conference League	Total	Games played
1	(Romania) Ștefan Târnovanu	7	0	3	10	49
2	(Romania) Andrei Vlad	2	1	0	3	5
3	(Romania) Răzvan Ducan	0	1	0	1	1

=== Disciplinary record ===
As of 27 May 2023

Rank	Position	Name	Liga I			Cupa României			Europa Conference League			Total		
Rank	Position	Name	Booked	(yellow card) (yellow-red card)	Sent off (straight red)	Booked	(yellow card) (yellow-red card)	Sent off (straight red)	Booked	(yellow card) (yellow-red card)	Sent off (straight red)	Booked	(yellow card) (yellow-red card)	Sent off (straight red)
1	DF	(Cameroon) Joyskim Dawa	9	0	1	0	0	0	2	0	0	11	0	1
1	FW	(Romania) Octavian Popescu	5	0	1	1	1	0	4	0	0	10	1	1
3	DF	(Montenegro) Risto Radunović	8	0	0	1	1	0	1	0	0	10	1	0
4	FW	(Romania) David Miculescu	6	0	0	1	0	0	3	0	0	10	0	0
4	MF	(Romania) Darius Olaru	5	0	0	0	0	0	5	0	0	10	0	0
6	FW	(Romania) Florinel Coman	6	0	0	0	0	0	3	0	0	9	0	0
7	FW	(Italy) Andrea Compagno	6	0	0	0	0	0	2	0	0	8	0	0
8	FW	(Romania) Andrei Cordea	6	0	0	0	0	0	1	0	0	7	0	0
8	DF	(Estonia) Joonas Tamm	4	0	0	0	0	0	3	0	0	7	0	0
10	MF	(Romania) Răzvan Oaidă	5	0	0	0	0	0	1	0	0	6	0	0
10	MF	(France) Malcom Edjouma	4	0	0	0	0	0	2	0	0	6	0	0
12	DF	(Romania) Alexandru Pantea	5	0	0	0	0	0	0	0	0	5	0	0
12	DF	(Romania) Valentin Crețu	4	0	0	0	0	0	1	0	0	5	0	0
14	MF	(Romania) Deian Sorescu	4	0	0	0	0	0	0	0	0	4	0	0
14	MF	(Romania) Adrian Șut	3	0	0	0	0	0	1	0	0	4	0	0
14	GK	(Romania) Ștefan Târnovanu	3	0	0	0	0	0	1	0	0	4	0	0
17	FW	(Algeria) Billel Omrani	3	0	0	0	0	0	0	0	0	3	0	0
18	DF	(Romania) Iulian Cristea	2	0	0	0	0	0	0	0	0	2	0	0
19	DF	(Algeria) Rachid Bouhenna	0	0	0	0	1	0	0	0	0	0	1	0
19	MF	(North Macedonia) Boban Nikolov	1	0	0	0	0	0	0	0	0	1	0	0
19	DF	(Romania) Sorin Șerban	1	0	0	0	0	0	0	0	0	1	0	0
19	FW	(Romania) Bogdan Rusu	1	0	0	0	0	0	0	0	0	1	0	0
19	DF	(Romania) Radu Boboc	0	0	0	1	0	0	0	0	0	1	0	0
19	MF	(Romania) Ovidiu Popescu	0	0	0	0	0	0	1	0	0	1	0	0
19	DF	(Romania) Denis Haruț	0	0	0	0	0	0	1	0	0	1	0	0
19	FW	(Romania) Ianis Stoica	0	0	0	0	0	0	1	0	0	1	0	0

=== Attendances ===
As of 27 May 2023

	Matches	Attendances	Average	High	Low
Liga I	20	312,854	15,643	42,439	3,173
Cupa României	—	―	―	―	―
Europa Conference League	6	154,707	25,785	40,457	9,103
Total	26	467,561	17,983	42,439	3,173

== See also ==
- 2022–23 Cupa României
- 2022–23 SuperLiga
- 2022–23 UEFA Europa Conference League
