= Alexandru Musi =

Romanian footballer (born 2004)

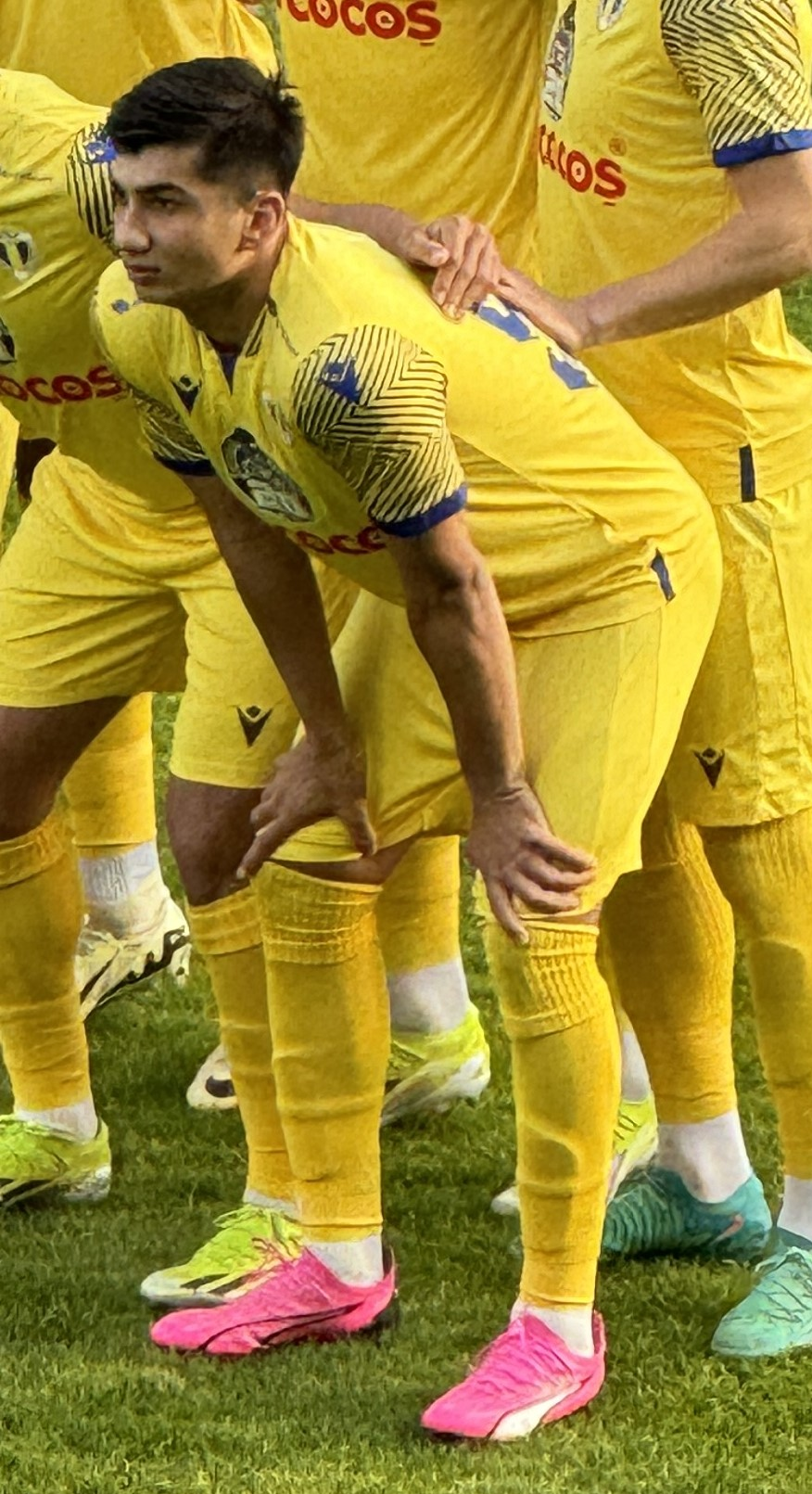
- Musi with Petrolul Ploiești in 2024

Personal information
- Full name: Alexandru Marian Musi
- Date of birth: 17 July 2004 (age 22)
- Place of birth: Bucharest, Romania
- Height: 1.80 m (5 ft 11 in)
- Positions: Attacking midfielder; winger

Team information
- Current team: Dinamo București
- Number: 7

Youth career
- 2012–2016: Valencia
- 2016–2021: FCSB

Senior career*
Years	Team	Apps	(Gls)
2021–2025	FCSB	32	(3)
2023	→ Politehnica Iași (loan)	13	(5)
2023–2024	→ Petrolul Ploiești (loan)	37	(4)
2025–	Dinamo București	44	(9)

International career^{‡}
2021–2022	Romania U18	6	(1)
2022–2023	Romania U19	8	(0)
2023–2024	Romania U20	9	(2)
2023–2026	Romania U21	9	(2)
- * Club domestic league appearances and goals as of 6 November 2026 ‡ National team caps and goals as of 31 March 2026

Alexandru Marian Musi (born 17 July 2004) is a Romanian professional footballer who plays as an attacking midfielder or a winger for Liga I club Dinamo București.

== Club career ==
=== FCSB ===
Musi joined the academy of FCSB from Spanish side Valencia in 2016. He made his professional debut for "the Red-Blues" by starting in a 0–1 Liga I loss to Universitatea Craiova, on 19 May 2021.

On 22 July 2021, Musi registered his European competitions debut in a 1–0 home defeat of Shakhter Karagandy in the UEFA Europa Conference League second qualifying round. On 22 September that year, he scored his first senior goal in a 5–3 Cupa României away win over Hunedoara.

==== Loans to Politehnica Iași and Petrolul Ploiești ====
In December 2022, Liga II team Politehnica Iași signed Musi on loan for the remainder of the season. He made 13 appearances and scored five goals, including doubles against title contenders CSA Steaua București (5–1 win) and Dinamo București (4–1 win) in May, as Iași won the Liga II and earned promotion to the first division.

On 22 June 2023, Musi was sent on a one-year loan to fellow Liga I side Petrolul Ploiești. He scored on debut in a 1–1 league draw with Universitatea Cluj, on 16 July.

==== Return to FCSB ====
After returning from his spell at Petrolul Ploiești, Musi won his first major trophy by playing in the 3–0 Supercupa României win over Corvinul Hunedoara on 4 July 2024. He then scored his first Liga I goal for FCSB in the opening match of the Liga I season, a 1–1 home draw against Universitatea Cluj on 13 July.

On 20 October 2024, Musi netted a stoppage-time goal to seal a 2–0 victory over historic rivals Dinamo București, which he described as "the greatest joy since starting [his] career". He totalled 21 league appearances and scored three goals during the campaign, as FCSB won back-to-back Liga I titles.

=== Dinamo București ===
On 11 June 2025, Musi joined rivals Dinamo București on a four-year contract. The transfer was part of a swap deal that involved Dennis Politic moving in the opposite direction to FCSB, with Dinamo receiving an additional €800,000.

On 14 July 2025, Musi scored on debut in a 2–2 Liga I away draw at newly-promoted Csíkszereda. On 2 August, he scored his second goal of the season and won a penalty in a 4–3 win over his former club FCSB, representing Dinamo's first derby victory in five years.

== Career statistics ==
As of match played 6 November 2026

Appearances and goals by club, season and competition
Club	Season	League			Cupa României		Europe		Other		Total	
Club	Season	Division	Apps	Goals	Apps	Goals	Apps	Goals	Apps	Goals	Apps	Goals
FCSB	2020–21	Liga I	2	0	—		—		0	0	2	0
FCSB	2021–22	Liga I	6	0	1	1	1 (Note: Appearance(s) in UEFA Europa Conference League)	0	—		8	1
FCSB	2022–23	Liga I	3	0	3	1	2	0	—		8	1
FCSB	2024–25	Liga I	21	3	2	0	7 (Note: Two appearances in UEFA Champions League, five appearances in UEFA Europa League)	0	1 (Note: Appearance in Supercupa României)	0	31	3
FCSB	Total		32	3	6	2	10	0	1	0	49	5
Politehnica Iași (loan)	2022–23	Liga II	13	5	—		—		—		13	5
Petrolul Ploiești (loan)	2023–24	Liga I	37	4	2	1	—		—		39	5
Dinamo București	2025–26	Liga I	35	7	3	1	—		1 (Note: Appearances in Liga I European play-offs)	0	39	8
Dinamo București	2026–27	Liga I	9	2	1	2	—		—		10	4
Dinamo București	Total		44	9	4	3	—		1	0	49	12
Career total			126	21	12	6	10	0	2	0	150	27

== Honours ==
Politehnica Iași

- Liga II: 2022–23

FCSB

- Liga I: 2024–25
- Supercupa României: 2024
