= Andrei Pandele =

Romanian footballer

Personal information
- Full name: Andrei Vlăduț Pandele
- Date of birth: 9 July 2003 (age 23)
- Place of birth: Bucharest, Romania
- Height: 1.83 m (6 ft 0 in)
- Position: Midfielder

Team information
- Current team: Metaloglobus București
- Number: 8

Youth career
- –2020: FCSB

Senior career*
| Years | Team | Apps | (Gls) |
| 2020–2021 | FCSB II | | |
| 2020–2024 | FCSB | 10 | (0) |
| 2021–2022 | → Metaloglobus București (loan) | 24 | (0) |
| 2022 | → Unirea Constanța (loan) | 15 | (3) |
| 2023 | → Gloria Buzău (loan) | 8 | (0) |
| 2024–2025 | Voluntari | 26 | (0) |
| 2026 | Chindia Târgoviște | 12 | (0) |
| 2026– | Metaloglobus București | 9 | (0) |

International career^{‡}
| 2018 | Romania U15 | 4 | (0) |
| 2018–2019 | Romania U16 | 5 | (0) |
| 2019–2020 | Romania U17 | 7 | (1) |
| 2021 | Romania U18 | 2 | (0) |
| 2021–2022 | Romania U19 | 16 | (1) |
| 2022–2023 | Romania U20 | 9 | (0) |
- * Club domestic league appearances and goals as of 31 October 2026 ‡ National team caps and goals as of 17 November 2023

Andrei Vlăduț Pandele (born 9 July 2003) is a Romanian professional footballer who plays as a midfielder for Liga II club Metaloglobus București.

== Career statistics ==
As of 31 October 2026

Appearances and goals by club, season and competition
| Club | Season | League | | | Cupa României | | Europe | | Other | | Total | |
| Club | Season | Division | Apps | Goals | Apps | Goals | Apps | Goals | Apps | Goals | Apps | Goals |
|---|---|---|---|---|---|---|---|---|---|---|---|---|
| FCSB | 2019–20 | Liga I | 2 | 0 | 0 | 0 | — | | — | | 2 | 0 |
| FCSB | 2023–24 | Liga I | 7 | 0 | 1 | 0 | — | | — | | 8 | 0 |
| FCSB | 2024–25 | Liga I | 1 | 0 | — | | 0 | 0 | 0 | 0 | 1 | 0 |
| FCSB | Total | | 10 | 0 | 1 | 0 | 0 | 0 | 0 | 0 | 11 | 0 |
| Metaloglobus București (loan) | 2021–22 | Liga II | 23 | 0 | 0 | 0 | — | | — | | 23 | 0 |
| Unirea Constanța (loan) | 2022–23 | Liga II | 15 | 3 | 1 | 0 | — | | — | | 16 | 3 |
| Gloria Buzău (loan) | 2022–23 | Liga II | 8 | 0 | — | | — | | — | | 8 | 0 |
| Voluntari | 2024–25 | Liga II | 20 | 0 | — | | — | | 1 (Note: Appearance in Liga I promotion/relegation play-offs) | 0 | 21 | 0 |
| Voluntari | 2025–26 | Liga II | 6 | 0 | 2 | 0 | — | | — | | 8 | 0 |
| Voluntari | Total | | 26 | 0 | 2 | 0 | — | | 1 | 0 | 28 | 0 |
| Chindia Târgoviște | 2025–26 | Liga II | 12 | 0 | — | | — | | 2 | 0 | 14 | 0 |
| Chindia Târgoviște | 2026–27 | Liga II | 0 | 0 | 0 | 0 | — | | — | | 0 | 0 |
| Chindia Târgoviște | Total | | 12 | 0 | 0 | 0 | — | | 2 | 0 | 14 | 0 |
| Metaloglobus București | 2026–27 | Liga II | 9 | 0 | — | | — | | — | | 9 | 0 |
| Career total | | | 103 | 3 | 4 | 0 | — | | 3 | 0 | 110 | 3 |

== Honours ==
FCSB

- Liga I: 2023–24, 2024–25
- Cupa României: 2019–20
- Supercupa României: 2024
