= 2024 Supercupa României =

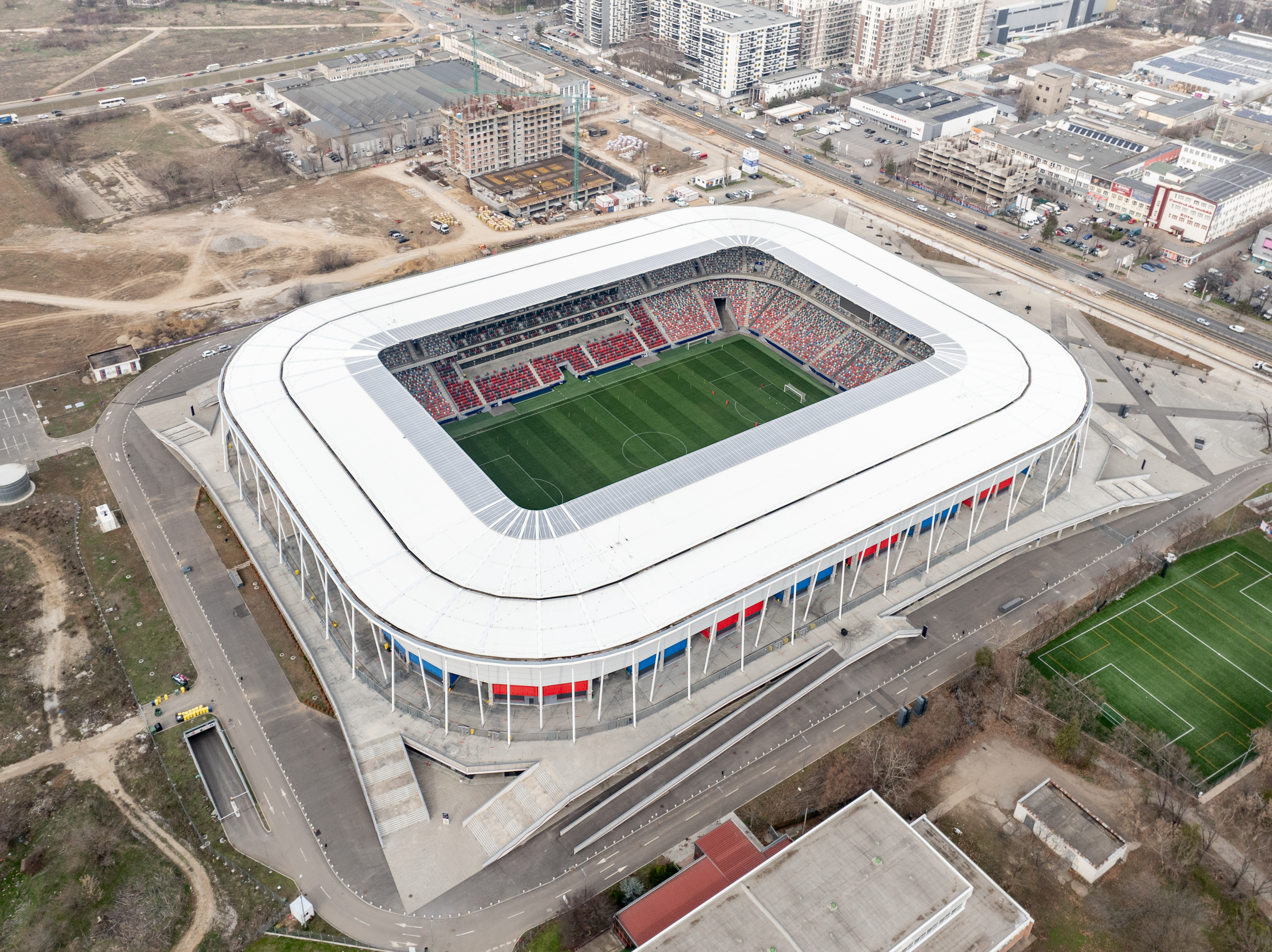
- Event: 2024 Supercupa României
FCSB	Corvinul Hunedoara
Liga I	Cupa României
3	0
- Date: 4 July 2024
- Venue: Steaua, Bucharest
- Referee: Florin Andrei
- Attendance: 15,915

The 2024 Supercupa României was the 26th edition of the Supercupa României, an annual football super cup contested by the winners of the previous season's Liga I and Cupa României competitions.

The game featured FCSB and Corvinul Hunedoara, and Steaua Stadium in Bucharest hosted the final for the first time on 4 July 2024.

== Teams ==
Team	Qualification	Previous participations (bold indicates winners)
FCSB	Winners of the 2023–24 Liga I	12 (**1994**, **1995**, **1998**, 1999, **2001**, 2005, **2006**, 2011, **2013**, 2014, 2015, 2020)
Corvinul Hunedoara	Winners of the 2023–24 Cupa României	None

== Match ==
Although initially set for Saturday, 6 July, the match was rescheduled due to overlap with a UEFA Euro 2024 quarter-final.

=== Details ===
4 July 2024
20:00 EEST (UTC+03)

FCSB	3–0	Corvinul Hunedoara
Miculescu 21'; Ștefănescu 52'; Phelipe 80'	Report 1

Steaua, Bucharest
Attendance: 15,915
Referee: Florin Andrei

GK	99	(Romania) Andrei Vlad
RB	20	(Ghana) Nana Antwi
CB	5	(Cameroon) Joyskim Dawa	(yellow card) 61'
CB	21	(Romania) Vlad Chiricheș (c)		(substituted off) 74'
LB	33	(Montenegro) Risto Radunović
CDM	42	(Uganda) Baba Alhassan
CDM	16	(Romania) Mihai Lixandru		(substituted off) 46'
RW	15	(Romania) Marius Ștefănescu
CAF	25	(Romania) Alexandru Băluță		(substituted off) 62'
LW	17	(Romania) Eduard Radaslavescu		(substituted off) 46'
ST	11	(Romania) David Miculescu		(substituted off) 46'
Substitutes:
RB	2	(Romania) Valentin Crețu
CDM	18	(France) Malcom Edjouma		(substituted in) 46'
CB	6	(Romania) Denis Haruț
LB	12	(Benin) David Kiki
CAM	70	(Brazil) Luis Phelipe		(substituted in) 62'
LW	29	(Romania) Alexandru Musi		(substituted in) 46'
CB	30	(South Africa) Siyabonga Ngezana		(substituted in) 74'
LB	3	(Romania) Ionuț Panțîru
ST	19	(Romania) Daniel Popa		(substituted in) 46'
RW	98	(Romania) David Popa
CAM	22	(Romania) Mihai Toma
GK	1	(Romania) Mihai Udrea
Manager:
(Cyprus) Elias Charalambous

GK	12	(Romania) Ștefan Lefter
RB	13	(Romania) Flavius Iacob
CB	6	(Romania) Viorel Lică
CB	30	(Romania) Antoniu Manolache
LB	98	(Romania) Mihai Velisar
CDM	97	(Romania) Denis Hrezdac	(substituted off) 83'
CDM	11	(Brazil) Roger
RW	10	(Romania) Alexandru Neacșa (c)	(substituted off) 65'
CAM	31	(Netherlands) Desley Ubbink	(substituted off) 19'
LW	19	(Romania) Nicolae Pîrvulescu
ST	9	(Romania) Sergiu Buș	(substituted off) 83'
Substitutes:
GK	1	(Romania) Cristian Blaga
CDM	8	(Romania) Antonio Bradu	(substituted in) 19' (substituted off) 65'
FW	27	(Romania) Lucas Câmpan	(substituted in) 83'
CDM	23	(Moldova) Ion Cărăruș	(substituted in) 83'
CDM	33	(Romania) Marius Chindriș
RW	20	(Romania) Alexandru Gîrbiță	(substituted in) 65'
LW	14	(Romania) Andrei Hergheligiu
FW	7	(Romania) Marius Lupu	(substituted in) 65'
CB	3	(Romania) Dorin Pop
Manager:
(Romania) Florin Maxim

**MAN OF THE MATCH**

- Marius Ștefănescu

**MATCH OFFICIALS**

- Assistant referees:
  - Andrei Constantinescu
  - Stelian Slabu
- Fourth official:
  - Ionuţ Coza
- Additional assistant referees:

**MATCH RULES**

- 90 minutes.
- Penalty shoot-out if scores still level.
- Twelve named substitutes.
- Maximum of five substitutions.

== See also ==
- 2024–25 Liga I
- 2024–25 Cupa României
