= Denis Haruț =

Romanian footballer

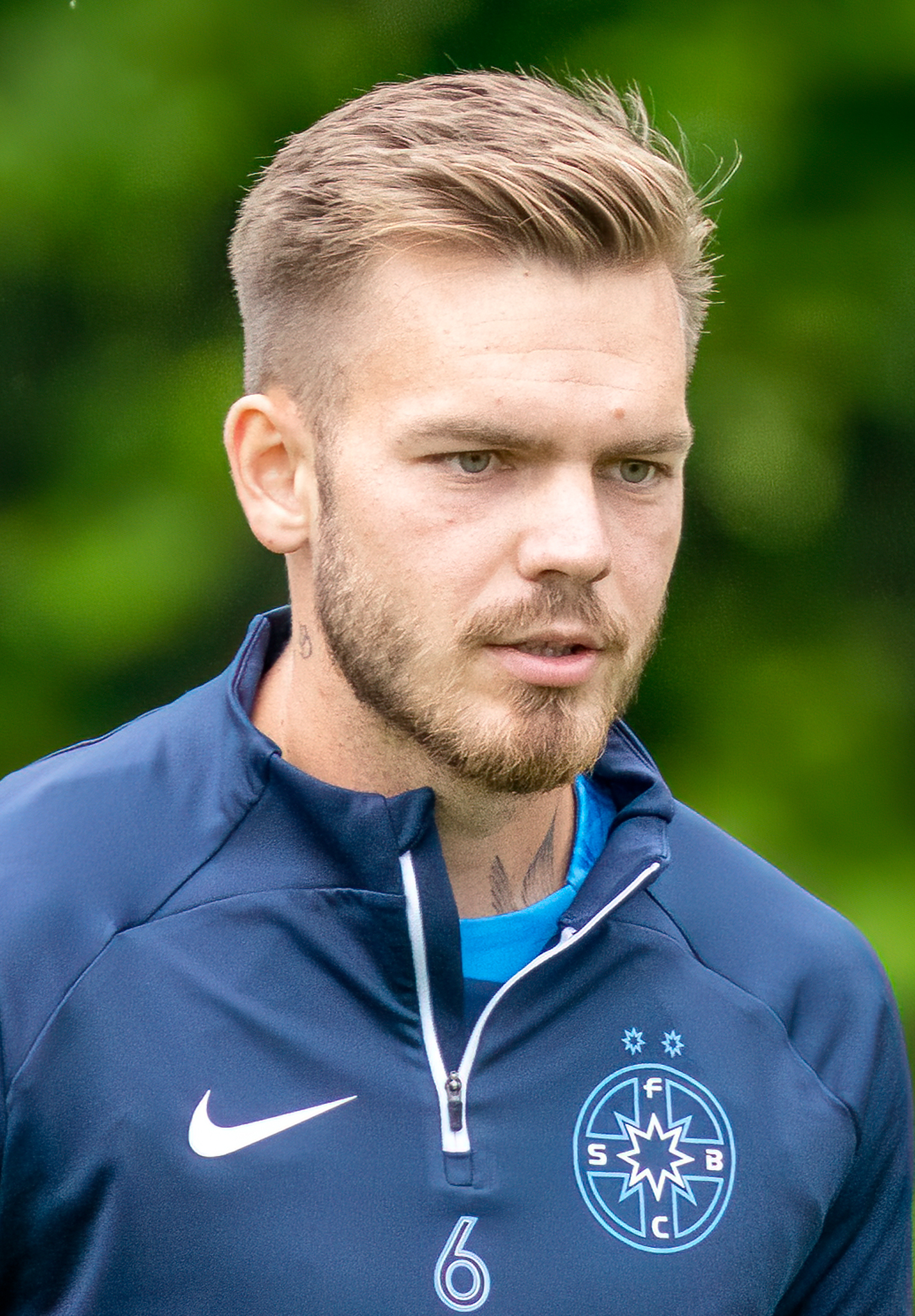
- Haruț with FCSB in 2023

Personal information
- Full name: Denis Grațian Haruț
- Date of birth: 25 February 1999 (age 27)
- Place of birth: Timișoara, Romania
- Height: 1.83 m (6 ft 0 in)
- Position: Defender

Team information
- Current team: Voluntari
- Number: 5

Youth career
- 2010–2013: LPS Banatul Timișoara
- 2013–2016: ACS Poli Timișoara

Senior career*
Years	Team	Apps	(Gls)
2017–2019	ACS Poli Timișoara	36	(0)
2019–2021	Botoșani	51	(1)
2021–2024	FCSB	41	(0)
2022	→ Botoșani (loan)	13	(1)
2024–2026	Sepsi OSK	47	(10)
2026–	Voluntari	13	(0)

International career
2015–2016	Romania U17	2	(0)
2016	Romania U18	3	(0)
2017–2018	Romania U19	7	(0)
2020–2021	Romania U21	8	(1)
- * Club domestic league appearances and goals as of 2 November 2026

Denis Grațian Haruț (born 25 February 1999) is a Romanian professional footballer who plays as a defender for Liga I club Voluntari.

== Career statistics ==
As of match played 2 November 2026

Appearances and goals by club, season and competition
Club	Season	League			Cupa României		Europe		Other		Total	
Club	Season	Division	Apps	Goals	Apps	Goals	Apps	Goals	Apps	Goals	Apps	Goals
ACS Poli Timișoara	2016–17	Liga I	0	0	1	0	—		1 (Note: Appearance in Cupa Ligii)	0	2	0
ACS Poli Timișoara	2017–18	Liga I	16	0	0	0	—		—		16	0
ACS Poli Timișoara	2018–19	Liga II	20	0	0	0	—		—		20	0
ACS Poli Timișoara	Total		36	0	1	0	—		1	0	38	0
Botoșani	2019–20	Liga I	34	0	0	0	—		—		34	0
Botoșani	2020–21	Liga I	17	1	1	0	2 (Note: Appearances in UEFA Europa League)	0	—		20	1
Botoșani	Total		51	1	1	0	2	0	0	0	54	1
FCSB	2020–21	Liga I	10	0	1	0	—		1 (Note: Appearance in Supercupa României)	0	12	0
FCSB	2021–22	Liga I	11	0	1	0	1 (Note: Appearance(s) in UEFA Europa Conference League)	0	—		13	0
FCSB	2022–23	Liga I	9	0	2	0	5	0	—		16	0
FCSB	2023–24	Liga I	10	0	3	0	3	0	—		16	0
FCSB	2024–25	Liga I	1	0	0	0	2 (Note: Appearances in UEFA Champions League)	0	0	0	3	0
FCSB	Total		41	0	7	0	11	0	1	0	60	0
Botoșani (loan)	2021–22	Liga I	13	1	—		—		1 (Note: Appearance in Liga I play-offs for UEFA Europa Conference League)	0	14	1
Sepsi OSK	2024–25	Liga I	28	5	0	0	—		—		28	5
Sepsi OSK	2025–26	Liga II	19	5	2	0	—		—		21	5
Sepsi OSK	Total		47	10	2	0	—		—		49	10
Voluntari	2026–27	Liga I	13	0	3	0	—		—		16	0
Career Total			201	12	14	0	13	0	3	0	231	12

== Honours ==
ACS Poli Timișoara

- Cupa Ligii runner-up: 2016–17

FCSB

- Liga I: 2023–24, 2024–25
- Supercupa României: 2024
