= Risto Radunović =

Montenegrin footballer (born 1992)

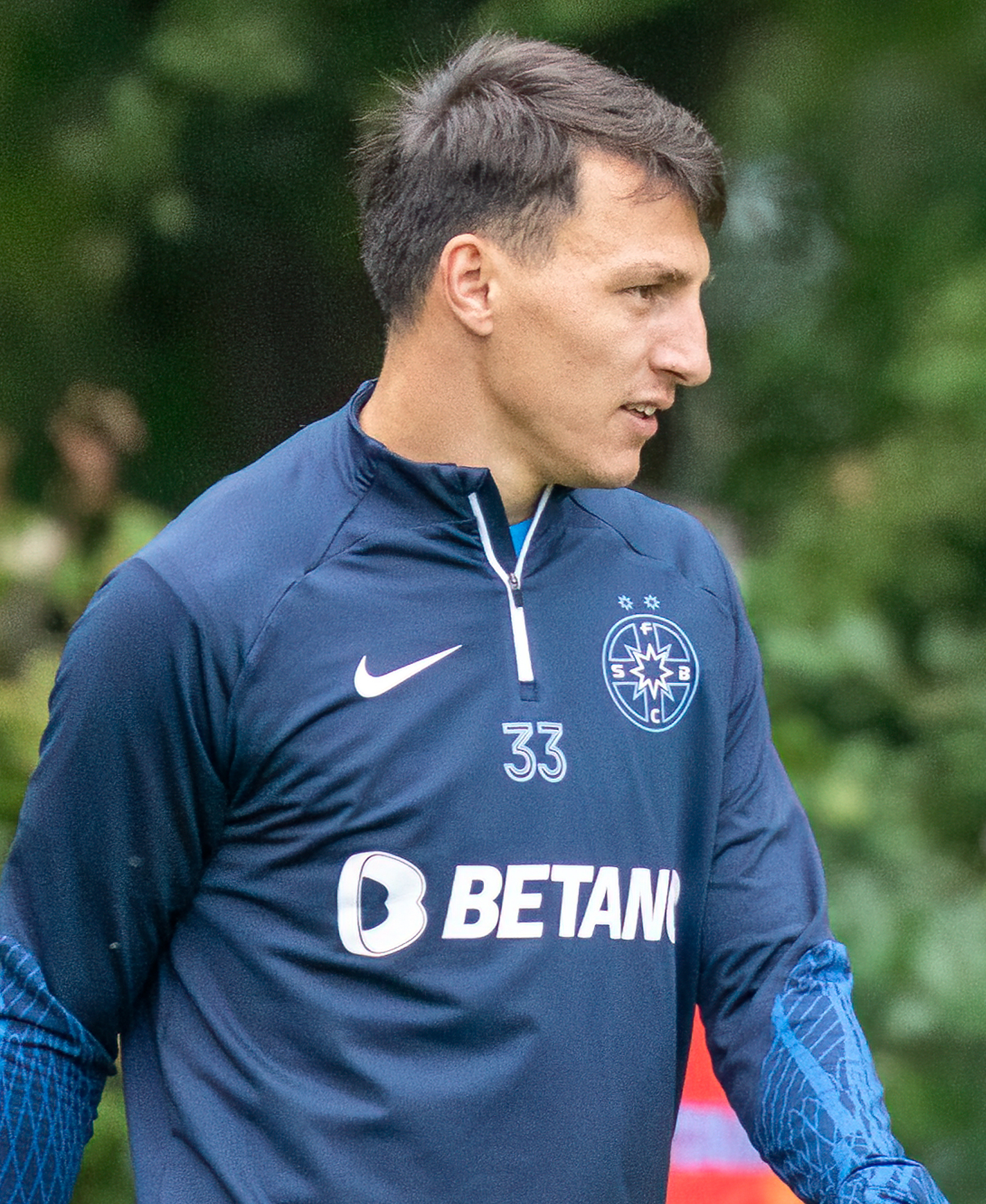
- Radunović with FCSB in 2023

Personal information
- Date of birth: 4 May 1992 (age 34)
- Place of birth: Podgorica, FR Yugoslavia
- Height: 1.83 m (6 ft 0 in)
- Positions: Left-back; defensive midfielder

Team information
- Current team: FCSB
- Number: 33

Youth career
- –2010: Kom

Senior career*
Years	Team	Apps	(Gls)
2010–2014	Budućnost	96	(1)
2014–2015	Borac Čačak	5	(0)
2015–2017	Budućnost	55	(4)
2017–2020	Astra Giurgiu	91	(5)
2021–	FCSB	189	(4)

International career^{‡}
2010–2011	Montenegro U19	10	(0)
2011–2014	Montenegro U21	11	(0)
2018–	Montenegro	47	(1)
- * Club domestic league appearances and goals as of 22 November 2026 ‡ National team caps and goals as of 15 November 2026

Risto Radunović (Montenegrin Cyrillic: Ристо Радуновић, pronounced [rǐːsto radǔːnoʋitɕ]; born 4 May 1992) is a Montenegrin professional footballer who plays as a left-back or a defensive midfielder for Liga I club FCSB and the Montenegro national team.

== Club career ==
=== Budućnost Podgorica ===
Born in the Montenegrin capital Podgorica, Radunović made his debut in 2010 and had been playing for 4 seasons with FK Budućnost Podgorica in the Montenegrin First League when, in summer 2014, he moved abroad and signed with FK Borac Čačak who had just made their return to the Serbian top-tier that summer. During his time in Montenegro, he has won the Montenegrin League in 2012 as well as the Montenegrin Cup in 2013. His first career goal came in May 2014 when he scored a penalty in a 2-1 win over Grbalj.

=== Borac Čačak ===
During the 2014-15 season Radunović only played 6 matches for Borac Čačak who managed to survive relegation by 2 points.

=== Return to Budućnost ===
Radunović returned to Budućnost in 2015 after just a season away. Radunović scored two goals during the 2015-16 season, both of which were in the Montenegrin Cup. Against Berane in a 5-0 win and against Grbalj in a 2-1 win. Budućnost reached the final of the Montenegrin Cup but lost on penalties to Rudar and they also came in second place in the league that season, 4 points behind Mladost.

During the 2016-17 season Budućnost won the Montenegrin League, tied on points with both Zeta and Mladost. Radunović scored 4 goals in the league that season. He also scored the winning goal against Rabotnichki in the Europa League qualifiers as Budućnost won 2-1 on aggregate and progressed to the next round.

=== Astra Giurgiu ===
In 2017, Radunović moved to Astra Giurgiu in Romania. The team had previously won the 2015-16 Liga I. During the 2017-18 Radunović made 22 appearances for the Romanian team. Astra Giurgiu came in fifth place in the league that season and reached the quarter finals of the Cupa României.

During the 2018-19 season, Astra Giurgiu reached the final of the Cupa României but were defeated 2-1 by Viitorul Constanța in extra time. In the league, Astra came in fifth place once again. Radunović scored his only goal of the season on 16 February 2019, in a 1-1 draw against CFR Cluj in a league match.

In the 2019-20 season, Astra came in third place in Liga I but were not able to participate in European qualifiers as they were unable to obtain a UEFA license. Radunović scored two goals during the season, both of which were scored in a 3-2 win over CFR Cluj in the league.

Astra lost financial support in the 2020-21 season. They finished 15th in the league and were relegated to the second division. Radunović transferred to FCSB halfway through the season. He scored twice for Astra before he left, in a 4-0 win over Politehnica Iași and in a 3-0 win over Gaz Metan Mediaș.

== International career ==
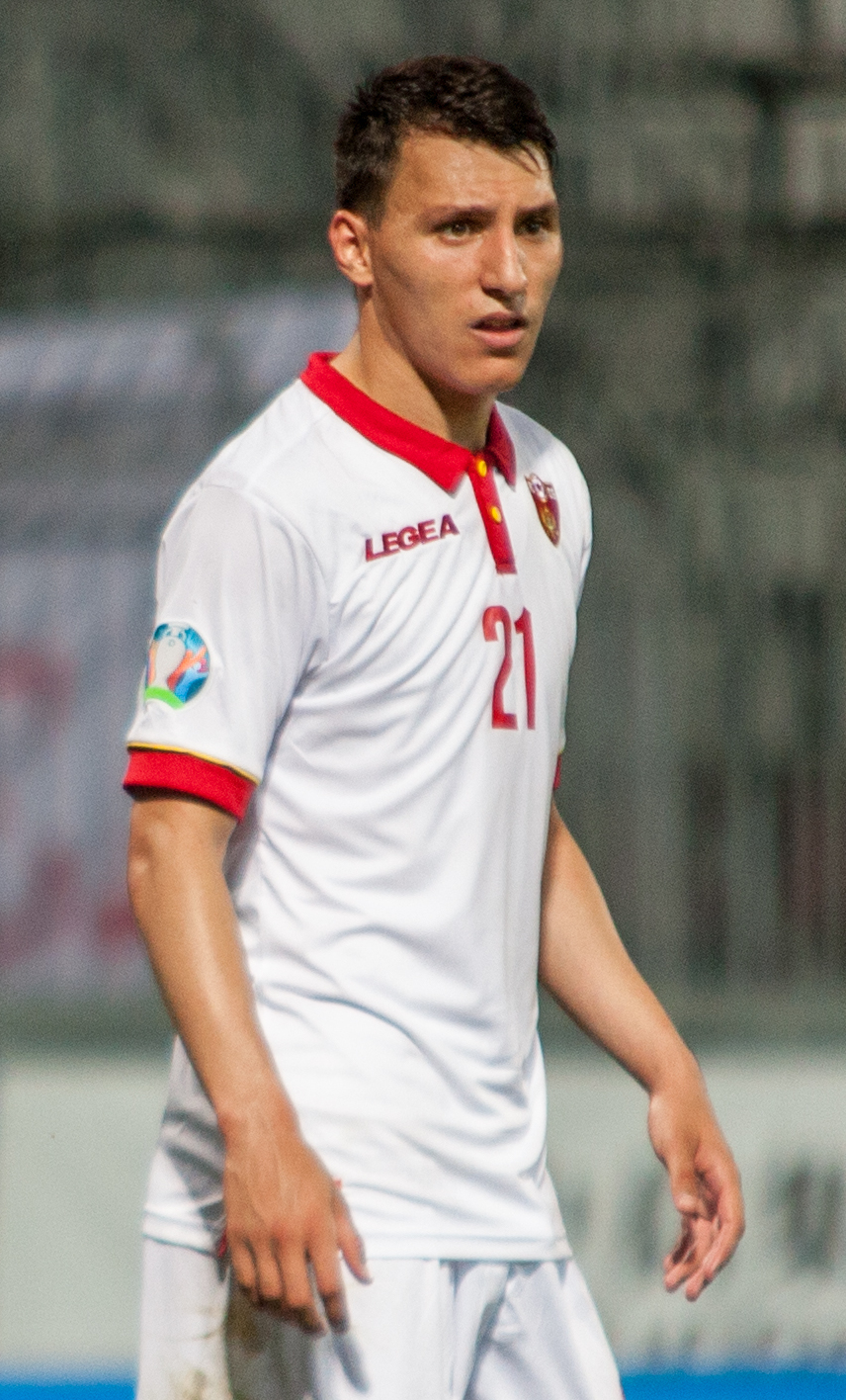
Radunović with Montenegro in 2019

In May 2016, Radunović was called up to the Montenegro national team for a friendly against Turkey. He debuted as a substitute on 14 October 2018, in an UEFA Nations League away match against Lithuania, a 4–1 win. On 1 September 2021, he scored his first international goal dramatically for his team in 2022 FIFA World Cup qualification against Turkey in 90+7 minute. He entered to game replaced by Zarko Tomasevic on 66th minute and he was a golden substitute for his team to help the Montenegrin escape defeat.

== Career statistics ==
=== Club ===
As of match played 22 November 2026.

Appearances and goals by club, season and competition
Club	Season	League			National cup (Note: Includes Serbian Cup, Montenegrin Cup, Cupa României)		Continental		Other		Total	
Club	Season	Division	Apps	Goals	Apps	Goals	Apps	Goals	Apps	Goals	Apps	Goals
Budućnost	2010–11	Montenegrin First League	18	0	1	0	―		―		19	0
Budućnost	2011–12	Montenegrin First League	32	0	0	0	2 (Note: Appearances in UEFA Europa League)	0	―		34	0
Budućnost	2012–13	Montenegrin First League	17	0	2	0	2 (Note: Appearances in UEFA Champions League)	0	―		21	0
Budućnost	2013–14	Montenegrin First League	29	1	0	0	―		―		29	1
Budućnost	Total		96	1	3	0	4	0	―		103	1
Borac Čačak	2014–15	Serbian SuperLiga	5	0	1	0	―		―		6	0
Budućnost	2015–16	Montenegrin First League	31	0	7	2	―		―		38	2
Budućnost	2016–17	Montenegrin First League	24	4	2	0	3	1	―		29	5
Budućnost	Total		55	4	9	2	3	1	―		67	7
Astra Giurgiu	2017–18	Liga I	19	0	3	0	0	0	―		22	0
Astra Giurgiu	2018–19	Liga I	27	1	4	0	―		―		31	1
Astra Giurgiu	2019–20	Liga I	32	2	1	0	―		―		33	2
Astra Giurgiu	2020–21	Liga I	13	2	1	0	―		―		14	2
Astra Giurgiu	Total		91	5	9	0	0	0	―		100	5
FCSB	2020–21	Liga I	22	0	0	0	―		1 (Note: Appearance in Supercupa României)	0	23	0
FCSB	2021–22	Liga I	30	0	1	0	2 (Note: Appearances in UEFA Europa Conference League)	0	―		33	0
FCSB	2022–23	Liga I	31	1	1	1	9	2	―		41	4
FCSB	2023–24	Liga I	35	1	0	0	4	0	―		39	1
FCSB	2024–25	Liga I	31	1	0	0	18 (Note: Four appearances in UEFA Champions League, fourteen appearances in UEFA Europa League)	0	1	0	50	1
FCSB	2025–26	Liga I	30	0	1	0	12 (Note: Four appearances and one goal in UEFA Champions League, eight appearances in UEFA Europa League)	1	3 (Note: One appearance and one goal in Supercupa României, two appearances in Liga I European play-offs)	1	46	2
FCSB	2026–27	Liga I	10	1	0	0	2	0	―		12	1
FCSB	Total		189	4	3	1	47	3	5	1	244	9
Career Total			436	14	25	3	54	4	5	1	520	22

=== International ===
As of match played 15 November 2026.

National team	Year	Apps	Goals
Montenegro
Montenegro	2018	1	0
Montenegro	2019	4	0
Montenegro	2020	4	0
Montenegro	2021	9	1
Montenegro	2022	9	0
Montenegro	2023	6	0
Montenegro	2024	6	0
Montenegro	2025	3	0
Montenegro	2026	5	0
Total		47	1

Scores and results list Montenegro's goal tally first, score column indicates score after each Radunović goal.

List of international goals scored by Risto Radunović
No.	Date	Venue	Opponent	Score	Result	Competition
1	1 September 2021	Vodafone Park, Istanbul, Turkey	Turkey	2–2	2–2	2022 FIFA World Cup qualification

== Honours ==
Budućnost

- Montenegrin First League: 2011–12, 2016–17
- Montenegrin Cup: 2012–13

Astra Giurgiu

- Cupa României runner-up: 2018–19

FCSB

- Liga I: 2023–24, 2024–25
- Supercupa României: 2024, 2025

Individual

- Gazeta Sporturilor Foreign Player of the Year in Romania: 2024
- Liga I Team of the Season: 2024–25
