= David Miculescu =

Romanian footballer (born 2001)

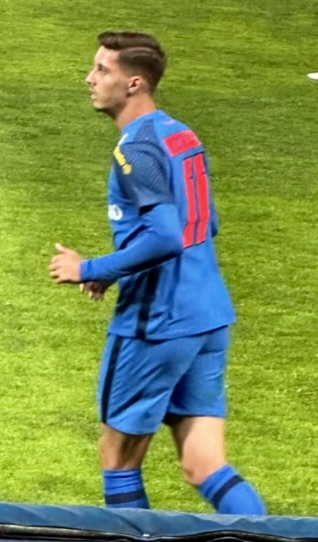
- Miculescu with FCSB in 2022

Personal information
- Full name: David Raul Miculescu
- Date of birth: 2 May 2001 (age 25)
- Place of birth: Timișoara, Romania
- Height: 1.89 m (6 ft 2 in)
- Positions: Winger; forward

Team information
- Current team: FCSB
- Number: 11

Youth career
- 2007–2014: Electrica Timișoara
- 2014–2015: Gheorghe Hagi Academy
- 2015–2016: Regal Sport București
- 2016–2018: UTA Arad

Senior career*
Years	Team	Apps	(Gls)
2017–2022	UTA Arad	108	(16)
2022–	FCSB	150	(21)

International career^{‡}
2018–2019	Romania U18	5	(1)
2019	Romania U19	4	(1)
2021–2023	Romania U21	14	(2)
2021	Romania Olympic	1	(0)
2025–	Romania	8	(0)
- * Club domestic league appearances and goals as of 22 November 2026 ‡ National team caps and goals as of 31 March 2026

David Raul Miculescu (born 2 May 2001) is a Romanian professional footballer who plays as a winger or a forward for Liga I club FCSB and the Romania national team.

He started his senior career at UTA Arad in 2017, amassing over 110 games in all competitions before being signed by FCSB five years later.

Internationally, Miculescu has represented Romania at under-18, under-19, under-21 and under-23 levels.

== Club career ==
=== Early career / UTA Arad ===
Miculescu joined the youth ranks of UTA Arad in the spring of 2016, after having previously played for Electrica Timișoara, the Gheorghe Hagi Academy and the Atlético Madrid academy in Bucharest, respectively. He made his senior debut for UTA on 23 September 2017, aged 16, coming on as a 78th-minute substitute for Amir Jorza in a 0–1 Liga II loss at Olimpia Satu Mare.

On 9 March 2019, Miculescu scored his first goal for the club by equalising in an eventual 2–1 home victory over ACS Poli Timișoara. In the 2019–20 season, he amassed three goals from 25 appearances as UTA became Liga II champion and achieved promotion to the top tier.

Miculescu recorded his first match in the Liga I on 28 September 2020, in a 1–0 away defeat of Dinamo București, and netted for the first time on 20 April 2021 in another 1–0 win against the same opponent. On 2 October 2021, he scored his first career double in a 2–2 league draw also against Dinamo București.

On 22 April 2022, Miculescu signed a contract extension that would have kept him at the club until 2024. On 25 July, he scored his first goals of the campaign in a 2–0 home win over newly-promoted Petrolul Ploiești.

=== FCSB ===
On 1 August 2022, Miculescu was officially unveiled at FCSB after the club activated his €1.7 million release clause. He signed a five-year contract and was assigned the number 11 shirt. Two days later, he registered his debut by starting in a 1–0 away win over DAC Dunajská Streda in the UEFA Europa Conference League third qualifying round.

On his Liga I debut against Mioveni on 6 August 2022, Miculescu scored a header to seal a 1–1 draw. He failed to make an impact during his first season in Bucharest, totalling 36 league appearances—of which he only started 11—and scoring three goals.

== Style of play ==
A tall and physical player, Miculescu can be deployed in an advanced midfield position or wide as a winger, preferably on the right flank.

== Personal life ==
Miculescu's father, Valentin, was also a professional footballer. A striker, he too played for UTA Arad.

== Career statistics ==
=== Club ===
As of match played 22 November 2026

Appearances and goals by club, season and competition
Club	Season	League			Cupa României		Europe		Other		Total	
Club	Season	Division	Apps	Goals	Apps	Goals	Apps	Goals	Apps	Goals	Apps	Goals
UTA Arad	2017–18	Liga II	1	0	0	0	—		—		1	0
UTA Arad	2018–19	Liga II	14	1	0	0	—		—		14	1
UTA Arad	2019–20	Liga II	25	3	0	0	—		—		25	3
UTA Arad	2020–21	Liga I	28	2	2	0	—		—		30	2
UTA Arad	2021–22	Liga I	37	8	1	0	—		—		38	8
UTA Arad	2022–23	Liga I	3	2	—		—		—		3	2
UTA Arad	Total		108	16	3	0	—		—		111	16
FCSB	2022–23	Liga I	36	3	2	0	9 (Note: Appearances in UEFA Europa Conference League)	0	—		47	3
FCSB	2023–24	Liga I	35	5	3	1	3	0	—		41	6
FCSB	2024–25	Liga I	37	6	1	0	20 (Note: Six appearances and three goals in UEFA Champions League, fourteen appearances and three goals in UEFA Europa League)	6	1 (Note: Appearance in Supercupa României)	1	59	13
FCSB	2025–26	Liga I	31	6	2	0	15 (Note: Four appearances and one goal in UEFA Champions League, eleven appearances and two goals in UEFA Europa League)	3	2 (Note: One appearance in Supercupa României, one appearance in Liga I European play-offs)	0	50	9
FCSB	2026–27	Liga I	11	1	2	2	0	0	—		13	3
FCSB	Total		150	21	10	3	47	9	3	1	210	34
Career total			258	37	13	3	47	9	3	1	321	50

=== International ===
As of match played 31 March 2026.

Appearances and goals by national team and year
National team	Year	Apps	Goals
Romania
Romania	2025	6	0
Romania	2026	2	0
Total		8	0

== Honours ==
UTA Arad

- Liga II: 2019–20

FCSB

- Liga I: 2023–24, 2024–25
- Supercupa României: 2024, 2025
