= Malcom Edjouma =

French footballer (born 1996)

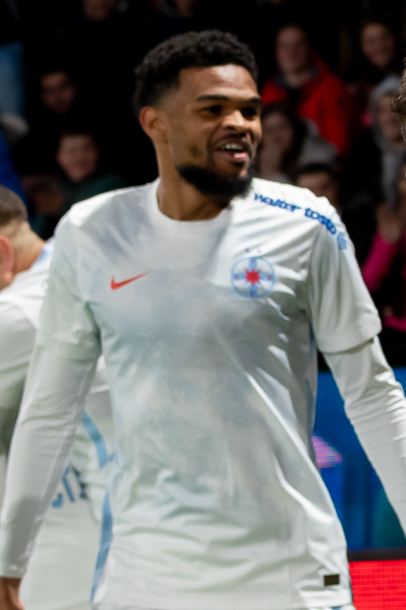
- Edjouma with FCSB in 2022

Personal information
- Full name: Malcom Sylas Edjouma Laouari
- Date of birth: 8 October 1996 (age 30)
- Place of birth: Toulouse, France
- Height: 1.91 m (6 ft 3 in)
- Position: Midfielder

Team information
- Current team: Qingdao Hainiu
- Number: 6

Youth career
- 2005–2008: Paris Saint-Germain
- 2008–2010: Toulouse
- 2010–2011: Bordeaux
- 2011–2013: Toulouse Fontaines

Senior career*
Years	Team	Apps	(Gls)
2013–2014	Balma	7	(1)
2014–2016	Châteauroux B	24	(0)
2016	Châteauroux	1	(0)
2016–2017	Belfort	22	(0)
2017–2018	Concarneau	29	(2)
2018–2020	Lorient B	3	(0)
2018–2020	Lorient	3	(0)
2019	→ Red Star (loan)	9	(0)
2019–2020	→ Chambly (loan)	9	(0)
2019–2020	→ Chambly B (loan)	2	(1)
2020	Viitorul Constanța	3	(0)
2020	Roeselare	0	(0)
2021–2022	Botoșani	22	(4)
2022–2025	FCSB	80	(13)
2023–2024	→ Bari (loan)	22	(2)
2026–	Qingdao Hainiu	24	(6)
- * Club domestic league appearances and goals as of 24 October 2026

Malcom Sylas Edjouma Laouari (Arabic: مالكوم سيلاس إدجوما هواري; born 8 October 1996) is a French professional footballer who plays as a midfielder for Chinese Super League club Qingdao Hainiu.

== Career ==
Edjouma began his youth career with the youth academies of PSG and Toulouse.

On 29 July 2018, Edjouma transferred to FC Lorient, and was loaned back to US Concarneau for the remainder of the season. Edjouma made his professional debut with Lorient in a 0–0 Ligue 2 tie with Le Havre AC on 28 July 2018.

On 10 January 2019, Edjouma was loaned out to fellow second tier club Red Star F.C. for the remainder of the season.

On 16 July 2019, Edjouma was loaned out to Ligue 2 side Chambly.

On 23 January 2020, Edjouma signed a two-and-a-half-year contract with Romanian club Viitorul Constanța.

On 17 August 2023, Edjouma joined Bari in Italy on loan with an option to buy.

== International career ==
Edjouma is eligible to represent the France national football team, Cameroon national football team and Morocco national football team at senior level. In September 2018, Edjouma accepted a call-up to the Morocco local national football team by coach Jamal Sellami, and chose to represent Morocco.

In 2018, Edjouma featured in an unofficial friendly for the Morocco national football team.

== Personal life ==
Edjouma was born in Toulouse, France, to a Cameroonian father and a Moroccan mother. He holds both French and Moroccan nationalities. His younger brother Noah Edjouma, a forward born in 2005, signed professionally for Toulouse in 2023.

== Career statistics ==
As of match played 24 October 2026

Appearances and goals by club, season and competition
Club	Season	League			National cup (Note: Includes Coupe de France, Cupa României)		League cup (Note: Includes Coupe de la Ligue)		Continental		Other		Total	
Club	Season	Division	Apps	Goals	Apps	Goals	Apps	Goals	Apps	Goals	Apps	Goals	Apps	Goals
Balma	2013–14	CFA 2	7	1	—		—		—		—		7	1
Châteauroux B	2014–15	CFA 2	4	0	—		—		—		—		4	0
Châteauroux B	2015–16	CFA 2	20	0	—		—		—		—		20	0
Châteauroux B	Total		24	0	—		—		—		—		24	0
Châteauroux	2015–16	Championnat National	1	0	—		0	0	—		—		1	0
Belfort	2016–17	Championnat National	22	0	1	0	—		—		—		23	0
Concarneau	2017–18	Championnat National	29	2	3	0	—		—		—		32	2
Lorient	2018–19	Ligue 2	3	0	0	0	3	1	—		—		6	1
Lorient B	2018–19	Championnat National 2	3	0	—		—		—		—		3	0
Red Star (loan)	2018–19	Ligue 2	9	0	—		—		—		—		9	0
Chambly (loan)	2019–20	Ligue 2	9	0	0	0	1	0	—		—		10	0
Chambly B (loan)	2019–20	Championnat National 3	2	1	—		—		—		—		2	1
Viitorul Constanța	2019–20	Liga I	3	0	—		—		—		—		3	0
Botoșani	2021–22	Liga I	22	4	1	0	—		—		—		23	4
FCSB	2021–22	Liga I	14	2	—		—		—		—		14	2
FCSB	2022–23	Liga I	29	9	0	0	—		11 (Note: Appearances in UEFA Europa Conference League)	2	—		40	11
FCSB	2023–24	Liga I	4	1	0	0	—		3	0	—		7	1
FCSB	2024–25	Liga I	24	0	1	0	—		18 (Note: Five appearances and three goals in UEFA Champions League, eleven appearances in UEFA Europa League)	3	1 (Note: Appearance in Supercupa României)	0	44	3
FCSB	2025–26	Liga I	9	1	2	0	—		7 (Note: Appearances in UEFA Europa League)	0	0	0	18	1
FCSB	Total		80	13	3	0	—		39	5	1	0	123	18
Bari (loan)	2023–24	Serie B	22	2	0	0	—		—		—		22	2
Qingdao Hainiu	2026	Chinese Super League	24	6	1	0	—		—		—		25	6
Career total			260	29	9	0	4	1	39	5	1	0	313	35

== Honours ==
FCSB

- Liga I: 2023–24, 2024–25
- Supercupa României: 2024, 2025

Individual

- Gazeta Sporturilor Romania Player of the Month: February 2023
