= Eduard Radaslavescu =

Romanian professional footballer

Personal information
- Full name: Eduard Gabriel Radaslavescu
- Date of birth: 30 July 2004 (age 22)
- Place of birth: Orșova, Romania
- Height: 1.80 m (5 ft 11 in)
- Position: Attacking midfielder

Team information
- Current team: Farul Constanța
- Number: 20

Youth career
- –2018: Luceafărul Drobeta Turnu Severin
- 2018–2021: Gheorghe Hagi Academy

Senior career*
Years	Team	Apps	(Gls)
2021–2022	Farul Constanța	25	(1)
2022–2024	FCSB	36	(1)
2024–	Farul Constanța	86	(12)

International career^{‡}
2021	Romania U17	1	(0)
2021	Romania U18	2	(0)
2022–2023	Romania U19	12	(2)
2021–2025	Romania U20	15	(4)
2025–2026	Romania U21	6	(0)
- * Club domestic league appearances and goals as of 7 November 2026 ‡ National team caps and goals as of 6 October 2026

Eduard Gabriel Radaslavescu (born 30 July 2004) is a Romanian professional footballer who plays as an attacking midfielder for Liga I club Farul Constanța.

== Club career ==
=== Farul Constanța ===
Radaslavescu made his senior debut for Farul Constanța on 22 September 2021, in a 0–1 home loss to Sepsi OSK in the Cupa României. On the 17th of the next month, he registered his first Liga I appearance in a 1–2 away loss to Argeș Pitești. His first senior goal came on 9 April 2022, in a 2–0 league win against the same opponent.

=== FCSB ===
On 5 August 2022, Radaslavescu transferred to fellow Liga I team FCSB. He scored his first goal for the Roș-albaștrii on 19 October that year, in a 2–2 Cupa României draw at UTA Arad.

== Career statistics ==
As of match played 7 November 2026

Appearances and goals by club, season and competition
Club	Season	League			Cupa României		Continental		Other		Total	
Club	Season	Division	Apps	Goals	Apps	Goals	Apps	Goals	Apps	Goals	Apps	Goals
Farul Constanța	2021–22	Liga I	24	1	1	0	—		—		25	1
Farul Constanța	2022–23	Liga I	1	0	—		—		—		1	0
Farul Constanța	Total		25	1	1	0	—		—		26	1
FCSB	2022–23	Liga I	14	1	2	1	5 (Note: Appearance(s) in UEFA Europa Conference League)	0	—		21	2
FCSB	2023–24	Liga I	22	0	2	0	1	0	—		25	0
FCSB	2024–25	Liga I	—		—		—		1 (Note: Appearance in Supercupa României)	0	1	0
FCSB	Total		36	1	4	1	6	0	1	0	47	2
Farul Constanța	2024–25	Liga I	32	4	5	2	—		—		37	6
Farul Constanța	2025–26	Liga I	39	3	2	0	—		2 (Note: Appearances in Liga I promotion/relegation play-offs)	1	43	4
Farul Constanța	2026–27	Liga I	15	5	0	0	—		—		15	5
Farul Constanța	Total		86	12	7	2	—		2	1	95	15
Career total			147	14	12	3	6	0	3	1	168	18

== Honours ==
Farul Constanța

- Liga I: 2022–23

FCSB

- Liga I: 2023–24
- Supercupa României: 2024
