= 2023–24 Liga I =

106th season of the top-tier football league in Romania

Liga I
- Season: 2023–24
- Dates: 14 July 2023 – 27 May 2024
- Champions: FCSB; 27th title
- Relegated: FCU 1948 Craiova; Voluntari
- Champions League: FCSB
- Conference League: CFR Cluj; Universitatea Craiova
- Matches: 317
- Goals: 823 (2.6 per match)
- Top goalscorer: Florinel Coman; Philip Otele (18 goals)
- Best goalkeeper: Ștefan Târnovanu (15 clean sheets)
- Biggest home win: Sepsi OSK 6–0 Politehnica Iași (19 January 2024)
- Biggest away win: Petrolul Ploiești 0–4 Voluntari (6 April 2024)
- Highest scoring: FCU 1948 Craiova 3–5 Rapid București (25 August 2023)
- Longest winning run: 5 matches FCSB; CFR Cluj; Rapid București
- Longest unbeaten run: 13 matches Hermannstadt
- Longest winless run: 20 matches Botoșani
- Longest losing run: 6 matches Sepsi OSK
- Highest attendance: 54,673; FCSB 0–1 CFR Cluj (11 May 2024)
- Lowest attendance: 210; Voluntari 1–1 Oțelul Galați (22 January 2024)
- Total attendance: 2,232,723
- Average attendance: 7,066
- All statistics correct as of 26 May 2024.

The 2023–24 Liga I (also known as Superliga for sponsorship reasons) is the 106th season of the Liga I, the top Romanian professional league for association football clubs. The season started on 14 July 2023 and concluded on 27 May 2024. It is the ninth season to take place since the play-off/play-out format has been introduced.

Politehnica Iași, Oțelul Galați, and Dinamo București joined as the promoted clubs from the 2022–23 Liga II. Following the 2–1 home defeat of title contenders and defending champions Farul Constanța on 27 April, FCSB officially secured their first Liga I title in nine years;

== Teams ==
=== Promotion and relegation (pre-season) ===
The league consists of 16 teams: 12 teams from the 2022–23 Liga I, two teams promoted from the 2022–23 Liga II, and the winners of the 2022–23 promotion/relegation play-off.

==== Teams promoted from the Liga II ====
The first club to be promoted was Politehnica Iași, following their 2–0 win against Oțelul Galați on 2 May 2023. Politehnica Iași returned to the Liga I after two years of absence.

The second club to be promoted was Oțelul Galați, following their 1–0 win against Unirea Dej on 21 May 2023. Oțelul Galați returned to the Liga I after eight years of absence, and the first time since being refounded in 2016 following bankruptcy.

The third club to be promoted was Dinamo București, after winning the 2022–23 promotion/relegation play-off against Argeș Pitești. Dinamo București returned to the Liga I after one year of absence.

==== Teams relegated to the Liga II ====
The first club to be relegated was Mioveni, following a 0–2 defeat to Argeș Pitești on 29 April 2023, ending their two-year stay in the top flight.

The second club to be relegated was Chindia Târgoviște, which were relegated following their 2–2 draw with Voluntari on 19 May 2023, ending their four-year stay in the top flight.

The third club to be relegated was Argeș Pitești, which were relegated following their 4–2 loss against Dinamo București in the promotion/relegation play-offs on 3 June 2023, ending their three-year stay in the top flight.

=== Stadiums and locations ===
FCSB	Universitatea Craiova	FCU 1948 Craiova	Universitatea Cluj
Arena Națională	Ion Oblemenco		Cluj Arena
Capacity: 55,634	Capacity: 30,983		Capacity: 30,201
CFR Cluj	Petrolul Ploiești	Rapid București	Oțelul Galați
Dr. Constantin Rădulescu	Ilie Oană	Rapid–Giulești	Oțelul
Capacity: 22,198	Capacity: 15,073	Capacity: 14,047	Capacity: 13,500
Hermannstadt	2023–24 Liga I (Romania) Location of Bucharest / Ilfov County teams.		UTA Arad
Municipal (Sibiu)	2023–24 Liga I (Romania) Location of Bucharest / Ilfov County teams.		Francisc von Neuman
Capacity: 12,363	2023–24 Liga I (Romania) Location of Bucharest / Ilfov County teams.		Capacity: 11,500
Politehnica Iași	2023–24 Liga I (Romania) Location of Bucharest / Ilfov County teams.		Sepsi OSK
Emil Alexandrescu	2023–24 Liga I (Romania) Location of Bucharest / Ilfov County teams.		Sepsi Arena
Capacity: 11,390	2023–24 Liga I (Romania) Location of Bucharest / Ilfov County teams.		Capacity: 8,400
Dinamo București	Botoșani	Voluntari	Farul Constanța
Arcul de Triumf	Municipal (Botoșani)	Anghel Iordănescu	Viitorul
Capacity: 8,207	Capacity: 7,782	Capacity: 4,600	Capacity: 4,554

=== Number of teams by county ===
Rank	County	Number	Teams
1	Bucharest	3	FCSB, Rapid București, Dinamo București
2	Dolj	2	Universitatea Craiova, FCU 1948 Craiova
2	Cluj	2	CFR Cluj, Universitatea Cluj
4	Sibiu	1	Hermannstadt
4	Arad	1	UTA Arad
4	Covasna	1	Sepsi OSK
4	Botoșani	1	Botoșani
4	Prahova	1	Petrolul Ploiești
4	Galați	1	Oțelul Galați
4	Iași	1	Politehnica Iași
4	Constanța	1	Farul Constanța
4	Ilfov	1	Voluntari

=== Personnel and sponsorship ===
Note: Flags indicate national team as has been defined under FIFA eligibility rules. Players and Managers may hold more than one non-FIFA nationality.

Team	Manager	Captain	Kit manufacturer	Main Shirt sponsor	Other Shirt sponsor
Botoșani	(Romania) Bogdan Andone	(Romania) Andrei Miron	Adidas	Unibet	Elsaco
CFR Cluj	(Romania) Dan Petrescu	(Romania) Mário Camora	Nike	RMB Inter Auto	
Dinamo București	(Croatia) Željko Kopić	(Romania) Răzvan Patriche	Macron	win2.ro	Renovatio
Farul Constanța	(Romania) Gheorghe Hagi (owner and manager)	(Romania) Ionuț Larie	Nike	Superbet	
FCSB	(Cyprus) Elias Charalambous	(Romania) Darius Olaru	Nike	Betano	
FCU 1948 Craiova	(Romania) Eugen Trică	(Belgium) William Baeten	Adidas	Craiova Cetatea Banilor	
Hermannstadt	(Romania) Marius Măldărășanu	(Romania) Ionuț Stoica	Nike	Unibet	Primăria Municipiului Sibiu
Oțelul Galați	(Romania) Dorinel Munteanu	(Italy) Juri Cisotti	Adidas	Liberty	Galați Municipality
Petrolul Ploiești	(Romania) László Balint	(Romania) Valentin Țicu	Macron	La Cocoș	
Politehnica Iași	(France) Tony	(Romania) Silviu Lung Jr.	Nike	Mozzart Bet	Municipiul Iași
Rapid București	(Romania) Bogdan Lobonț (caretaker)	(Romania) Cristian Săpunaru	Kappa	Superbet	IMAMED
Sepsi OSK	(Germany) Bernd Storck	(Romania) Roland Niczuly	Adidas	Diószegi	Gyermelyi
Universitatea Cluj	(Romania) Ioan Sabău	(Romania) Alexandru Chipciu	Adidas	Superbet	AROBS
Universitatea Craiova	(Romania) Constantin Gâlcă	(Romania) Nicușor Bancu	Puma	Betano	
UTA Arad	(Romania) Mircea Rednic	(Romania) Florin Iacob	Saller	Efbet	Maxximus
Voluntari	(Romania) Florin Pârvu	(Moldova) Igor Armaș	Nike	Metropola TV	Maxbet

=== Managerial changes ===
Team	Outgoing manager	Manner of departure	Date of vacancy	Position in table	Incoming manager	Date of appointment
Sepsi OSK	(Italy) Cristiano Bergodi	End of contract	30 June 2023	Pre-season	(Romania) Liviu Ciobotariu	1 July 2023
Voluntari	(Romania) Liviu Ciobotariu	End of contract	30 June 2023	Pre-season	(Romania) Ilie Poenaru	8 June 2023
FCU 1948 Craiova	(Italy) Nicolò Napoli	End of contract	30 June 2023	Pre-season	(Romania) Nicolae Dică	17 July 2023
Universitatea Cluj	(Romania) Ioan Sabău	End of contract	30 June 2023	Pre-season	(Romania) Anton Petrea	1 July 2023
Botoșani	(Romania) Flavius Stoican	Mutual agreement	30 June 2023	Pre-season	(Romania) Marius Croitoru	18 May 2023
CFR Cluj	(Romania) Dan Petrescu	Mutual agreement	30 June 2023	Pre-season	(Italy) Andrea Mandorlini	1 July 2023
Rapid București	(Romania) Adrian Mutu	Signed by Neftçi	7 July 2023	Pre-season	(Italy) Cristiano Bergodi	9 July 2023
Universitatea Craiova	(Romania) Eugen Neagoe	Sacked	25 July 2023	5th	(Romania) Laurențiu Reghecampf	25 July 2023
Botoșani	(Romania) Marius Croitoru	Sacked	17 August 2023	16th	(Romania) Mihai Ciobanu	17 August 2023
FCU 1948 Craiova	(Romania) Nicolae Dică	Sacked	19 August 2023	11th	(Romania) Paul Răducan	19 August 2023
Universitatea Cluj	(Romania) Anton Petrea	Sacked	24 August 2023	12th	(Romania) Ioan Sabău	24 August 2023
Botoșani	(Romania) Mihai Ciobanu	Sacked	1 September 2023	16th	(Romania) Dan Alexa	1 September 2023
Universitatea Craiova	(Romania) Laurențiu Reghecampf	Mutual agreement	21 September 2023	3rd	(Romania) Corneliu Papură	21 September 2023
FCU 1948 Craiova	(Romania) Paul Răducan	Mutual agreement	16 October 2023	10th	(Italy) Giovanni Costantino	16 October 2023
Botoșani	(Romania) Dan Alexa	Mutual agreement	3 November 2023	16th	(Romania) Andrei Patache	3 November 2023
Universitatea Craiova	(Romania) Corneliu Papură	Mutual agreement	7 November 2023	5th	(Bulgaria) Ivaylo Petev	7 November 2023
Dinamo București	(Romania) Ovidiu Burcă	Mutual agreement	28 November 2023	15th	(Croatia) Željko Kopić	1 December 2023
Sepsi OSK	(Romania) Liviu Ciobotariu	Mutual agreement	29 November 2023	10th	(Germany) Bernd Storck	29 November 2023
Botoșani	(Romania) Andrei Patache	Mutual agreement	28 December 2023	16th	(Romania) Bogdan Andone	28 December 2023
CFR Cluj	(Italy) Andrea Mandorlini	Sacked	23 January 2024	2nd	(Romania) Adrian Mutu	24 January 2024
Voluntari	(Romania) Ilie Poenaru	Sacked	31 January 2024	14th	(Romania) Nicolae Dica	31 January 2024
FCU 1948 Craiova	(Italy) Giovanni Costantino	Sacked	29 February 2024	14th	(Italy) Nicolò Napoli	4 March 2024
Petrolul Ploiești	(Romania) Florin Pârvu	Sacked	9 March 2024	10th	(Romania) Florin Stângă caretaker	9 March 2024
Voluntari	(Romania) Nicolae Dică	Sacked	12 March 2024	15th	(Romania) Florin Pârvu	13 March 2024
Politehnica Iasi	(Romania) Leontin Grozavu	Sacked	30 March 2024	13th	(Portugal) Anthony da Silva	31 March 2024
CFR Cluj	(Romania) Adrian Mutu	Resigned	3 April 2024	3th	(Romania) Ovidiu Hoban caretaker	4 April 2024
FCU 1948 Craiova	(Italy) Nicolò Napoli	Mutual Agreement	5 April 2024	14th	(Romania) Eugen Trică	5 April 2024
Petrolul Ploiești	(Romania) Florin Stângă caretaker	Mutual Agreement	8 April 2024	11th	(Romania) László Balint	8 April 2024
Universitatea Craiova	(Bulgaria) Ivaylo Petev	Sacked	11 April 2024	4th	(Romania) Constantin Gâlcă	17 April 2024
Rapid București	(Italy) Cristiano Bergodi	Sacked	16 April 2024	5th	(Romania) Bogdan Lobonț caretaker	16 April 2024
CFR Cluj	(Romania) Ovidiu Hoban caretaker	Mutual Agreement	1 May 2024	3th	(Romania) Dan Petrescu	1 May 2024

== Regular season ==
In the regular season the 16 teams will meet twice for a total of 30 matches per team, with the top 6 advancing to the championship play-offs and the bottom 10 qualifying for the relegation play-outs.

=== Table ===
Pos	Team	Pld	W	D	L	GF	GA	GD	Pts	Qualification
1	FCSB	30	19	7	4	53	28	+25	64	Qualification to play-off round
2	Rapid București	30	15	10	5	55	32	+23	55	Qualification to play-off round
3	CFR Cluj	30	15	8	7	54	29	+25	53	Qualification to play-off round
4	Universitatea Craiova	30	13	10	7	47	38	+9	49	Qualification to play-off round
5	Farul Constanța	30	11	10	9	37	38	−1	43 (Note: Head to head points: Farul Constanța 6, Sepsi OSK 0)	Qualification to play-off round
6	Sepsi OSK	30	12	7	11	43	34	+9	43	Qualification to play-off round
7	Universitatea Cluj	30	10	12	8	35	38	−3	42	Qualification to play-out round
8	UTA Arad	30	10	10	10	36	43	−7	40 (Note: Head to head points: UTA 3 (+1), Hermannstadt 3 (-1))	Qualification to play-out round
9	Hermannstadt	30	9	13	8	36	31	+5	40	Qualification to play-out round
10	Petrolul Ploiești	30	7	14	9	29	32	−3	35	Qualification to play-out round
11	Oțelul Galați	30	6	16	8	31	36	−5	34	Qualification to play-out round
12	Politehnica Iași	30	7	12	11	33	44	−11	33	Qualification to play-out round
13	FCU 1948 Craiova	30	9	4	17	43	50	−7	31	Qualification to play-out round
14	Dinamo București	30	8	5	17	22	41	−19	29	Qualification to play-out round
15	Voluntari	30	6	10	14	31	49	−18	28	Qualification to play-out round
16	Botoșani	30	3	12	15	30	52	−22	21	Qualification to play-out round

Source: , Soccerway
Rules for classification: 1) Points; 2) Head-to-head points; 3) Head-to-head goal difference; 4) Head-to-head goals scored; 5) Goal difference; 6) Goals scored; 7) Play-off.

=== Results ===
Home \ Away	BOT	CFR	DIN	FAR	FCS	FCU	HER	IAS	OTE	PET	RAP	SPS	UCJ	UCV	UTA	VOL
Botoșani		1–0	0–2	0–0	0–1	0–1	2–2	2–1	0–0	1–1	0–0	1–2	0–3	2–2	2–2	3–3
CFR Cluj	3–1		4–0	3–1	1–1	2–0	1–0	2–0	0–0	1–0	0–1	3–0	4–0	1–1	0–0	4–1
Dinamo București	1–0	1–1		0–2	0–1	1–1	1–0	0–0	3–1	1–1	1–2	0–3	0–1	0–2	1–0	1–0
Farul Constanța	1–1	1–1	0–2		0–1	1–0	1–1	1–3	1–1	3–1	0–0	2–1	1–1	2–0	2–2	4–1
FCSB	3–2	1–0	2–1	1–1		2–1	3–0	2–1	0–2	1–0	1–2	1–0	2–2	3–0	4–0	0–0
FCU 1948 Craiova	2–0	1–3	2–1	4–0	1–3		1–1	1–1	0–2	2–0	3–5	2–1	3–4	1–2	2–3	3–1
Hermannstadt	2–0	1–0	4–0	0–1	2–2	1–0		0–0	4–1	0–0	1–1	1–1	2–2	2–1	2–1	3–1
Politehnica Iași	1–1	3–3	0–0	2–3	1–3	1–1	1–3		1–1	0–0	3–1	1–0	1–0	1–4	1–0	0–0
Oțelul Galați	0–2	2–2	1–0	0–1	0–2	1–0	1–1	1–1		0–0	0–0	2–3	1–1	1–3	1–1	2–2
Petrolul Ploiești	2–1	1–2	1–0	3–2	2–2	4–3	0–0	2–1	2–2		0–0	1–2	1–1	2–3	0–0	0–2
Rapid București	2–2	3–1	4–0	3–1	4–0	4–3	2–0	3–2	2–1	0–2		0–0	2–3	2–0	4–1	1–2
Sepsi OSK	5–2	2–1	2–1	0–1	2–5	1–0	1–1	6–0	1–1	0–0	0–0		0–0	1–3	1–0	4–0
Universitatea Cluj	1–0	3–4	1–1	1–0	0–0	2–1	2–1	0–2	0–1	0–0	0–3	1–0		1–1	1–3	1–2
Universitatea Craiova	5–1	1–0	1–0	1–2	0–3	1–1	1–0	2–2	0–0	1–3	1–1	2–1	2–2		3–0	2–1
UTA Arad	2–2	1–3	2–1	0–0	2–1	3–2	2–0	1–0	2–4	1–0	2–2	2–1	0–1	2–2		0–0
Voluntari	2–1	1–4	2–3	4–2	1–2	0–1	1–1	1–2	1–1	0–0	2–1	0–2	0–0	0–0	0–1	

Source: LPF (in Romanian)
Legend: Blue = home team win; Yellow = draw; Red = away team win.

=== Positions by round ===
Team ╲ Round	1	2	3	4	5	6	7	8	9	10	11	12	13	14	15	16	17	18	19	20	21	22	23	24	25	26	27	28	29	30
FCSB	1	3	1	1	1	1	1	2	2	1	1	1	1	1	1	1	1	1	1	1	1	1	1	1	1	1	1	1	1	1
Rapid București	10	4	7	8	11	7	5	3	4	3	4	3	3	3	3	3	3	4	4	4	4	3	3	3	2	2	2	2	2	2
CFR Cluj	2	1	2	5	6	4	3	1	1	2	2	2	2	2	2	2	2	2	2	2	2	2	2	2	3	3	3	3	3	3
Universitatea Craiova	3	5	8	4	2	2	2	4	3	4	3	4	4	4	5	4	4	3	3	3	3	4	5	5	4	5	4	4	4	4
Farul Constanța	5	2	4	6	7	10	8	8	9	7	5	5	5	7	7	7	8	8	7	7	6	6	4	4	5	4	5	5	5	5
Sepsi OSK	11	6	3	3	4	5	7	6	8	10	12	12	10	9	8	9	10	10	9	5	5	5	6	6	8	10	10	7	7	6
Universitatea Cluj	9	13	9	10	10	12	11	15	10	12	11	8	8	8	9	10	7	6	5	6	8	7	7	8	7	9	9	6	6	7
UTA Arad	8	12	14	11	12	14	12	12	14	14	14	14	14	12	10	12	13	11	13	14	12	13	11	10	11	8	6	9	9	8
Hermannstadt	13	7	5	7	8	8	9	7	5	5	6	6	6	5	4	5	5	7	6	8	7	9	8	7	6	7	7	8	8	9
Petrolul Ploiești	7	9	12	9	5	3	4	5	6	6	7	7	7	6	6	6	6	5	8	9	10	8	9	9	9	6	8	10	10	10
Oțelul Galați	6	10	13	12	13	13	13	14	13	11	8	9	9	10	11	8	9	9	11	10	11	10	10	12	10	11	11	11	11	11
Politehnica Iași	16	16	10	14	15	16	16	11	11	8	9	10	11	11	12	11	12	13	12	13	14	14	13	13	13	13	13	13	12	12
FCU 1948 Craiova	14	15	15	13	9	11	14	10	7	9	10	11	12	13	14	14	14	14	14	11	9	11	12	11	12	12	12	12	13	13
Dinamo București	15	14	16	16	14	9	10	13	15	15	15	15	15	15	15	15	15	15	15	15	15	15	15	16	15	15	15	15	15	14
Voluntari	4	8	6	2	3	6	6	9	12	13	13	13	13	14	13	13	11	12	10	12	13	12	14	14	14	14	14	14	14	15
Botoșani	12	11	11	15	16	15	15	16	16	16	16	16	16	16	16	16	16	16	16	16	16	16	16	15	16	16	16	16	16	16

Leader and Qualification for the Play-off round
Qualification for the Play-off round
Qualification for the Play-out round

Source: Soccerway

== Play-off round ==
The top six teams from Regular season will meet twice (10 matches per team) for places in 2024–25 UEFA Champions League and 2024–25 UEFA Conference League as well as deciding the league champion. Teams start the Championship round with their points from the Regular season halved, rounded upwards, and no other records carried over from the Regular season.

=== Play-off table ===
Pos	Team	Pld	W	D	L	GF	GA	GD	Pts	Qualification	FCS	CFR	UCV	FAR	SEP	RAP
1	FCSB (C)	10	5	2	3	12	11	+1	49	Qualification to Champions League first qualifying round		0–1	2–0	2–1	2–1	2–2
2	CFR Cluj	10	6	1	3	19	14	+5	46	Qualification to Conference League second qualifying round	0–1		1–2	5–1	2–1	3–2
3	Universitatea Craiova (O)	10	6	1	3	18	14	+4	44	Qualification to European competition play-offs	2–0	0–1		1–2	3–2	2–1
4	Farul Constanța	10	4	2	4	19	20	−1	36		0–1	5–1	3–3		1–4	3–1
5	Sepsi OSK	10	3	3	4	17	17	0	34		2–2	1–1	1–3	1–1		3–2
6	Rapid București	10	1	1	8	13	22	−9	32		2–0	1–4	1–2	1–2	0–1	

Source: Soccerway, FRF (in Romanian), LPF (in Romanian)
Legend: Blue = home team win; Yellow = draw; Red = away team win.
Rules for classification: 1) Points; 2) Points without rounding; 3) Points in the regular season; 4) Head-to-head points; 5) Head-to-head goal difference; 6) Head-to-head goals scored; 7) Goal difference; 8) Goals scored; 9) Play-off (only if needed to decide champion or teams for UEFA competitions). (Note: only criteria 7 and 8 are applied to establish the classification during the competition.)
(C) Champions; (O) Play-off winners

== Play-out round ==
The bottom ten teams from the regular season meet once to contest against relegation. Teams started the play-out round with their points from the Regular season halved, rounded upwards, and no other records carried over from the Regular season. The winner of the Relegation round finish 7th in the overall season standings, the second placed team – 8th, and so on, with the last placed team in the Relegation round being 16th.

=== Play-out table ===
Pos	Team	Pld	W	D	L	GF	GA	GD	Pts	Qualification or relegation	UTA	OTE	HER	UCJ	PET	IAS	DIN	BOT	VOL	FCU
7	UTA Arad (Note: UTA Arad and Hermannstadt were ineligible to advance to the European competition play-offs because they did not receive a UEFA licence.)	9	5	2	2	15	11	+4	37			3–1	1–3					1–0	4–3	3–1
8	Oțelul Galați	9	6	1	2	11	7	+4	36	Qualification to European competition play-offs			1–0	1–0		1–0	1–0	2–0		
9	Hermannstadt	9	4	2	3	13	7	+6	34					1–1	2–0	0–1	3–0	1–1		
10	Universitatea Cluj	9	3	3	3	12	10	+2	33	Qualification to European competition play-offs	0–0				1–2	1–0	3–3	3–0		
11	Petrolul Ploiești	9	3	2	4	8	14	−6	29		1–1	2–1						1–2	0–4	1–0
12	Politehnica Iași	9	3	1	5	7	8	−1	27		0–2				2–0				3–1	0–0
13	Dinamo București (O)	9	2	4	3	10	12	−2	25	Qualification to relegation play-offs	2–0				1–1	1–0			1–1	
14	Botoșani (O)	9	4	2	3	11	11	0	25	Qualification to relegation play-offs						2–1	2–1		0–0	4–1
15	Voluntari (R)	9	2	4	3	11	10	+1	24	Relegation to Liga II		1–1	1–0	0–1						0–0
16	FCU 1948 Craiova (R)	9	1	3	5	8	16	−8	22	Relegation to Liga II		1–2	1–3	3–2			1–1			

Source: Soccerway, FRF (in Romanian), LPF (in Romanian)
Legend: Blue = home team win; Yellow = draw; Red = away team win.
Rules for classification: 1) Points; 2) Points without rounding; 3) Points in the regular season; 4) Head-to-head points; 5) Head-to-head goal difference; 6) Head-to-head goals scored; 7) Goal difference; 8) Goals scored; 9) Play-off (only if needed to decide teams for relegation). (Note: only criteria 7 and 8 are applied to establish the classification during the competition.)
(O) Play-off winners; (R) Relegated

== European play-offs ==
In the semi-final the 7th- and 8th-placed teams of the Liga I typically play a one-legged match on the ground of the better placed team (7th place). In the final, the winner of the play-out semi-final will play the highest ranked team of the play-off tournament, that did not already qualify for European competitions. The winner of the final will enter the second qualifying round of the 2024–25 UEFA Conference League. Oțelul Galați and Universitatea Cluj are qualified to this round because the other teams in the previous round don't have the European license to take part to any European competition.

European play-off semi-final

19 May 2024	Oțelul Galați	0–2	Universitatea Cluj	Galați
14:30 EEST (UTC+03)			Anselmo 62', 73'	Stadium: Oțelul; Attendance: 10,000

European play-off final

26 May 2024	Universitatea Craiova	1–1 (a.e.t.) (5–4 p)	Universitatea Cluj	Craiova
20:00	Houri 120' (pen.)		Nistor 120+10' (pen.)	Stadium: Ion Oblemenco Stadium; Attendance: 15,487; Referee: Marcel Bîrsan
	Penalties
	Koljić (penalty scored); Raúl Silva (penalty missed); Mekvabishvili (penalty scored); Crețu (penalty scored); Houri (penalty scored); Zajkov (penalty scored)		Bic (penalty scored); Mitrea (penalty scored); Chipciu (penalty scored); Thalisson (penalty scored); Nistor (penalty missed); Ilie (penalty missed)

== Promotion/relegation play-offs ==
The 13th and 14th-placed teams of the Liga I faces the 3rd and 4th-placed team of the Liga II.

Team 1	Agg.	Team 2	1st leg	2nd leg
Dinamo București	2–0	Csíkszereda Miercurea Ciuc	2–0	0–0
Botoșani	2–0	Mioveni	1–0	1–0

First leg

17 May 2024	Botoșani	1–0	Mioveni	Botoșani
	Aldaír 90+3'			Stadium: Municipal Stadium; Attendance: 5,816; Referee: Horațiu Feșnic

20 May 2024	Dinamo București	2–0	Csíkszereda Miercurea Ciuc	Bucharest
	Politic 46', 73'			Stadium: Arena Națională; Attendance: 31,123; Referee: Rareș Vidican

Second leg

24 May 2024	Mioveni	0–1	Botoșani	Mioveni
			Mailat 74'	Stadium: Orășenesc; Attendance: 5,000; Referee: Sebastian Colțescu

27 May 2024	Csíkszereda Miercurea Ciuc	0–0	Dinamo București	Miercurea Ciuc
20:00				Stadium: Municipal; Attendance: 2,356; Referee: Horațiu Feșnic

== Season statistics ==
=== Top scorers ===
As of 26 May 2024

Rank	Player	Club	Goals
1	(Romania) Florinel Coman	FCSB	18
1	(Nigeria) Philip Otele	CFR Cluj	18
3	(Kosovo) Albion Rrahmani	Rapid București	17
4	(Romania) Alexandru Mitriță	Universitatea Craiova	16
5	(Romania) Darius Olaru	FCSB	15
6	(Romania) Marius Ștefănescu	Sepsi OSK	14
6	(Romania) Daniel Bîrligea	CFR Cluj	14
8	(Romania) Dan Nistor	Universitatea Cluj	13
9	(Romania) Louis Munteanu	Farul Constanța	12
10	(Romania) Alexandru Pop	Oțelul Galați	11
10	(Romania) Daniel Paraschiv	Hermannstadt	11
10	(Romania) Eduard Florescu	Botoșani	11
10	(Romania) Daniel Popa	Universitatea Cluj	11

=== Hat-tricks ===
As of 26 May 2024

Player	For	Against	Result	Date
(Romania) Ionuț Larie	Farul Constanța	Voluntari	4–1 (H)	22 July 2023
(Romania) Alexandru Mitriță	Universitatea Craiova	Oțelul Galați	3–1 (A)	26 November 2023
(Romania) Darius Olaru	FCSB	UTA Arad	4–0 (H)	22 January 2024
(Romania) Daniel Bîrligea	CFR Cluj	Rapid București	4–1 (A)	6 April 2024
(Romania) Daniel Paraschiv	Hermannstadt	UTA Arad	3–1 (A)	12 April 2024
(Slovakia) Pavol Šafranko	Sepsi OSK	Farul Constanța	4–1 (A)	3 May 2024
(Romania) Alexandru Mitriță (2)	Universitatea Craiova	Farul Constanța	3–3 (A)	13 May 2024

=== Top assists ===
As of 26 May 2024

Rank	Player	Club	Assists
1	(Romania) Ciprian Deac	CFR Cluj	14
2	(Romania) Alexandru Mitriță	Universitatea Craiova	13
3	(Romania) Nicușor Bancu	Universitatea Craiova	9
3	(Romania) Florinel Coman	FCSB	9
3	(Romania) Dan Nistor	Universitatea Cluj	9

=== Clean sheets ===
As of 26 May 2024

Rank	Player	Club	Clean sheets
1	(Romania) Ștefan Târnovanu	FCSB	15
2	(Czech Republic) Lukáš Zima	Petrolul Ploiești	12
2	(Slovenia) Adnan Golubović	Dinamo București	12
4	(Romania) Răzvan Sava	CFR Cluj	11
5	(Romania) Roland Niczuly	Sepsi OSK	10
6	(Romania) Horațiu Moldovan	Rapid București	9
6	(Romania) Florin Iacob	UTA Arad	9
6	(Romania) Cătălin Căbuz	Hermannstadt	9
9	(Romania) Marian Aioani	Farul Constanța / Rapid București	8
9	(Spain) Jesús Fernández	Voluntari	8
9	(Romania) Laurențiu Popescu	Universitatea Craiova	8

== Champion squad ==
FCSB

Goalkeepers: Ștefan Târnovanu (39 / 0); Andrei Vlad (1 / 0)
Defenders: Nana Antwi (Ghana) (9 / 0); Vlad Chiricheș (10 / 0); Valentin Crețu (26 / 0); Joyskim Dawa (Cameroon) (36 / 3); Cristian Ganea (5 / 0); Denis Haruț (10 / 0); Siyabonga Ngezana (South Africa) (30 / 0); Ricardo Pădurariu (1 / 0); Alexandru Pantea (20 / 0); Ionuț Panțîru (4 / 0); Risto Radunović (Montenegro) (35 / 1)
Midfielders: Baba Alhassan (Uganda) (17 / 1); Damjan Đoković (Croatia) (17 / 2); Malcom Edjouma (France) (4 / 1); Valentin Gheorghe (1 / 0); Mihai Lixandru (34 / 1); Darius Olaru (36 / 15); Andrei Pandele (7 / 0); Ovidiu Popescu (30 / 1); Luis Phelipe (Brazil) (10 / 0); Eduard Radaslavescu (22 / 0); Adrian Șut (36 / 3); Mihai Toma (2 / 0)
Forwards: Alexandru Băluță (32 / 6); Florinel Coman (34 / 18); Andrea Compagno (Italy) (18 / 4); Andrei Cordea (4 / 0); David Miculescu (35 / 5); David Popa (3 / 0); Octavian Popescu (33 / 2); Dorin Rotariu (5 / 0)
(league appearances and goals listed in brackets)

Manager: Elias Charalambous (Cyprus)

== Awards ==
=== Monthly Awards ===
Note: The website and the award are not affiliated with the country's top flight competition, the Liga I—instead, voters can also choose between Romanian players and coaches who are competing abroad.

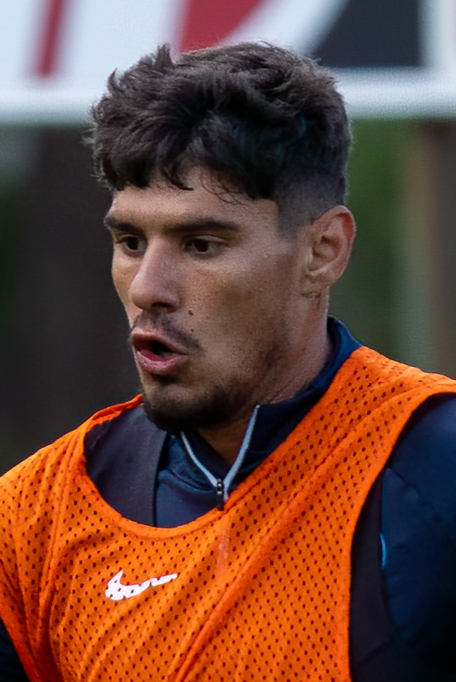
Florinel Coman was named Player of the Season by the Liga Profesionistă de Fotbal, and won two Romania Player of the Month awards from the non-affiliated Gazeta Sporturilor daily.

==== Player of the Month ====
Year	Month	Player	Nationality	Pos.	Team	Ref
2023	July	Florinel Coman	Romania	FW	FCSB	
2023	August	Aurelian Chițu	Romania	FW	FCU 1948 Craiova	
2023	September	Darius Olaru	Romania	MF	FCSB	
2023	October	Dan Nistor	Romania	MF	Universitatea Cluj	
2023	November	Horațiu Moldovan	Romania	GK	Rapid București	
2023	December	Darius Olaru	Romania	MF	FCSB	
2024	February	Albion Rrahmani	Kosovo	FW	Rapid București	
2024	March	Alexandru Mitriță	Romania	FW	Universitatea Craiova	
2024	April	Florinel Coman	Romania	FW	FCSB	
2024	May	Dennis Politic	Romania	MF	Dinamo București	

==== Manager of the Month ====
Year	Month	Manager	Nationality	Team	Ref
2023	July	Liviu Ciobotariu	Romania	Sepsi OSK	
2023	August	Liviu Ciobotariu	Romania	Sepsi OSK	
2023	September	Dorinel Munteanu	Romania	Oțelul Galați	
2023	October	Ioan Sabău	Romania	Universitatea Cluj	
2023	November	Edward Iordanescu	Romania	Romania	
2023	December	Răzvan Lucescu	Romania	(Greece) PAOK	
2024	February	Cristiano Bergodi	Italy	Rapid București	
2024	March	Ivaylo Petev	Bulgaria	Universitatea Craiova	
2024	April	Elias Charalambous	Cyprus	FCSB	
2024	May	Răzvan Lucescu	Romania	(Greece) PAOK	

=== Annual awards ===
Award	Winner	Club
Manager of the Season	(Cyprus) Elias Charalambous	FCSB
Player of the Season	(Romania) Florinel Coman	FCSB
Under-21 Player of the Season	(Romania) Răzvan Sava	CFR Cluj

Team of the Season
Goalkeeper	(Romania) Ștefan Târnovanu (FCSB)			
Defence	(Germany) Christopher Braun (Rapid București)	(South Africa) Siyabonga Ngezana (FCSB)	(Cameroon) Joyskim Dawa (FCSB)	(Romania) Nicușor Bancu (Universitatea Craiova)
Central Midfield	(Croatia) Karlo Muhar (CFR Cluj)		(Romania) Darius Olaru (FCSB)	
Attacking Midfield	(Nigeria) Philip Otele (CFR Cluj)		(Romania) Alexandru Mitriță (Universitatea Craiova)	(Romania) Florinel Coman (FCSB)
Attack	(Kosovo) Albion Rrahmani (Rapid București)			

== Attendances ==
#	Club	Average	Highest
1	FCSB	19,903	55,435
2	Rapid București	12,901	43,283
3	Universitatea Craiova	11,818	22,123
4	Universitatea Cluj	8,093	23,893
5	Petrolul Ploiești	7,365	13,250
6	Dinamo 1948	7,094	22,926
7	Oțelul Galați	6,909	12,897
8	UTA Arad	6,882	10,800
9	CFR Cluj	6,736	15,680
10	Hermannstadt	5,283	10,872
11	Politehnica Iași	5,138	10,121
12	Farul Constanța	4,886	34,222
13	Sepsi OSK	4,412	7,440
14	FCU 1948 Craiova	4,167	12,111
15	Botoșani	2,761	6,000
16	Voluntari	980	4,300

== See also ==
- 2023–24 Liga II
- 2023–24 Liga III
- 2023–24 Liga IV
- 2023–24 Cupa României
