= 2024–25 FC Petrolul Ploiești season =

FC Petrolul Ploiești
2024–25 season
- Manager: Mehmet Topal
- Stadium: Ilie Oană Stadium
- Liga I: 9th
- Cupa României: Group stage
- Top goalscorer: League: Gheorghe Grozav (10 goals); All: Gheorghe Grozav (10 goals)
- Average home league attendance: 5,635
- Biggest defeat: Dinamo București 4–1 Petrolul Ploiești
| Home colours | Away colours | Third colours |

The 2024–25 season was the 100th season in the history of FC Petrolul Ploiești, and the club's third consecutive season in Liga I. In addition to the domestic league, the team participated in the Cupa României.

== Transfers ==
=== In ===
| Pos. | Player | Transferred from | Fee | Date | Source |
|---|---|---|---|---|---|
| DF | (Portugal) Ricardinho | (Romania) Voluntari | Free | 1 July 2024 | |
| FW | (Romania) Alexandru Tudorie | (Romania) UTA Arad | Free | 1 July 2024 | |
| MF | (Romania) Alexandru Mateiu | (Romania) Universitatea Craiova | Free | 1 July 2024 | |
| MF | (France) Tidiane Keita | (France) USL Dunkerque | Free | 1 July 2024 | |
| FW | (United States) Nana Akosah-Bempah | (Israel) Hapoel Acre | Free | 19 July 2024 | |
| MF | (Brazil) Fabrício Baiano | (Japan) SC Sagamihara | Free | 19 July 2024 | |
| DF | (Romania) Denis Radu | (Romania) Voluntari | Undisclosed | 22 July 2024 | |

=== Out ===
| Pos. | Player | Transferred to | Fee | Date | Source |
|---|---|---|---|---|---|
| MF | (Japan) Takayuki Seto | | Released | 22 July 2024 | |

== Friendlies ==
=== Pre-season ===
| 26 June 2024 Friendly | FC Hermannstadt (Romania) | 0–1 | (Romania) Petrolul Ploiești | Bolu, Turkey |
| 16:30 UTC+3 | | Report | Tolea 21' |

| 29 June 2024 Friendly | Fenerbahçe (Turkey) | 2–1 | (Romania) Petrolul Ploiești | Bolu, Turkey |
| 10:30 UTC+3 | Džeko 41'; Zajc 57' | | Bratu 24'; Ilie (yellow card) 90' |

=== Mid-season ===
| 8 January 2025 Friendly | Orduspor (Turkey) | 1–1 | (Romania) Petrolul Ploiești |

| 11 January 2025 Friendly | CSKA 1948 Sofia (Bulgaria) | 3–2 | (Romania) Petrolul Ploiești | Kundu |
| | Thalis 7'; Karagaren 28'; Kirilov 63' | Report | Boțogan 55'; Radu 88' | Stadium: Topkapı Spor Kompleksi - Field 6 |

| 12 January 2025 Friendly | Zagłębie Lubin (Poland) | 1–0 | (Romania) Petrolul Ploiești |
| | Mikołajewski 78' | Report |

== Competitions ==
=== Overall record ===
| Competition | First match | Last match | Starting round | Record | | | | | | | |
| Competition | First match | Last match | Starting round | Pld | W | D | L | GF | GA | GD | Win % |
|---|---|---|---|---|---|---|---|---|---|---|---|
| Liga I | 15 July 2024 | | Matchday 1 | 4 | 1 | 2 | 1 | 2 | 4 | −2 | 25.00 |
| Cupa României | | | | 0 | 0 | 0 | 0 | 0 | 0 | +0 | — |
| Total | | | | 4 | 1 | 2 | 1 | 2 | 4 | −2 | 25.00 |

Last updated: 29 July 2024
Source: Soccerway

=== Liga I ===
==== League table ====
| Pos | Team | Pld | W | D | L | GF | GA | GD | Pts | Advances |
|---|---|---|---|---|---|---|---|---|---|---|
| 7 | Sepsi OSK | 30 | 11 | 8 | 11 | 38 | 35 | +3 | 41 (Note: Ranked on head-to-head goal difference: Sepsi (+3); Hermannstadt (-3).) | Qualification for play-out round |
| 8 | Hermannstadt | 30 | 11 | 8 | 11 | 34 | 40 | −6 | 41 | Qualification for play-out round |
| 9 | Petrolul Ploiești | 30 | 9 | 13 | 8 | 29 | 29 | 0 | 40 | Qualification for play-out round |
| 10 | Farul Constanța | 30 | 8 | 11 | 11 | 29 | 38 | −9 | 35 | Qualification for play-out round |
| 11 | UTA Arad | 30 | 8 | 10 | 12 | 28 | 35 | −7 | 34 | Qualification for play-out round |

Source: LPF (in Romanian)
Rules for classification: 1) Points; 2) Head-to-head points; 3) Head-to-head goal difference; 4) Head-to-head goals scored; 5) Goal difference; 6) Goals scored; 7) Play-off.

==== Results summary ====
| Overall | | | | | | | | Home | | | | | | Away | | | | | |
| Pld | W | D | L | GF | GA | GD | Pts | W | D | L | GF | GA | GD | W | D | L | GF | GA | GD |
|---|---|---|---|---|---|---|---|---|---|---|---|---|---|---|---|---|---|---|---|
| 4 | 1 | 2 | 1 | 2 | 4 | −2 | 5 | 1 | 1 | 0 | 1 | 0 | +1 | 0 | 1 | 1 | 1 | 4 | −3 |

Last updated: 4 August 2024.

==== Results by round ====
| Round | 1 | 2 | 3 | 4 | 5 |
|---|---|---|---|---|---|
| Ground | H | A | H | A | H |
| Result | D | L | W | D | |
| Position | 9 | 15 | 9 | | |

Updated to match(es) played on 4 August 2024. Source:
A = Away; H = Home; W = Win; D = Draw; L = Loss

==== Matches ====
The match schedule was released on 1 July 2024.

| 15 July 2024 1 | Petrolul Ploiești | 0–0 | Gloria Buzău | Ploiești |
| 21:30 UTC+3 | Huja (yellow card) 39'; Grozav (penalty missed) 58'; Hanca (yellow card) 63' | | Călin (yellow card) 11'; Sălceanu (yellow card) 48' | Stadium: Ilie Oană Stadium; Referee: István Kovács |

| 21 July 2024 2 | Dinamo București | 4–1 | Petrolul Ploiești | Bucharest |
| 22:00 UTC+3 | Abdallah 12'; Cîrjan 41'; Selmani 61'; Politic 86' (pen.) | | Țicu 82' | Stadium: Arcul de Triumf Stadium; Referee: Găman George Cătălin |

| 29 July 2024 3 | Petrolul Ploiești | 1–0 | Rapid București | Ploiești |
| 22:00 UTC+3 | Berisha 31'; Eșanu (yellow card) 90'; Hanca (yellow card) 90+5' | | Gojković (red card) 87' | Stadium: Ilie Oană Stadium; Referee: Andrei Chivulete |

| 4 August 2024 4 | Universitatea Craiova | 0–0 | Petrolul Ploiești | Craiova |
| 19:00 | | | | Stadium: Ion Oblemenco Stadium; Referee: Ionuţ Coza |

| 12 August 2024 5 | Petrolul Ploiești | 0–0 | Universitatea Cluj | Ploiești |
| 19:00 EEST | | Report | Thiam (yellow card) 43'; Bic (yellow card) 66' | Stadium: Ilie Oană Stadium; Attendance: 7,118; Referee: (Romania) Bogdan Dumitrache |

| 16 August 2024 6 | Unirea Slobozia | 1–2 | Petrolul Ploiești | Clinceni |
| 19:00 EEST | Gele 29' (red card) 50'; Christ Afalna (yellow card) 90+4' | Report | Rădulescu 39'; Papp (yellow card) 64'; Tudorie 77'; Dumitriu (yellow card) 90+3' | Stadium: Clinceni Stadium; Attendance: 1,200; Referee: (Romania) Viorel Flueran |

| 23 August 2024 7 | Petrolul Ploiești | 0–0 | Oțelul | Ploiești |
| 19:00 EEST | | Report | Đurić (yellow card) 33'; João Lameira (yellow card) 57'; Cissé (yellow card) 90+5' | Stadium: Ilie Oană Stadium; Attendance: 6,653; Referee: (Romania) Rareș Vidican |

| 1 September 2024 8 | Botoșani | 0–2 | Petrolul Ploiești | Botoșani |
| 16:30 EEST | Kaprof (yellow card) 22'; Florescu (yellow card) 49'; Mitrov (yellow card) 86' | Report | Dumitriu (yellow card) 18'; Papp (yellow card) 53'; Akosah-Bempah (yellow card) 90+2'; Rădulescu 90+4'; Grozav 90+6' | Stadium: Botoșani Municipal Stadium; Attendance: 3,300; Referee: (Romania) Szabolcs Kovacs |

| 14 September 2024 9 | Petrolul Ploiești | 1–1 | Farul Constanța | Ploiești |
| 21:30 EEST | Ricardinho (yellow card) 20'; Grozav 83' | Report | Alibec 61' (yellow card) 80'; Gustavo Marins (yellow card) 82' | Stadium: Ilie Oană Stadium; Attendance: 8,760; Referee: (Romania) Iulian Călin |

| 21 September 2024 10 | FCSB | 1–1 | Petrolul Ploiești | Bucharest |
| 21:30 EEST | Băluță 3' (yellow card) 43'; Olaru (yellow card) 21'; Popescu (red card) 30'; Radunović (yellow card) 45+2'; Crețu (yellow card) 72'; Târnovanu (yellow card) 79'; Șut (yellow card) 90+8' | Report | Marian Huja (yellow card) 4'; Rădulescu (yellow card) 42'; Papp (yellow card) 72'; Jyry (yellow card) 88'; Tudorie 90+4' | Stadium: Arena Națională; Attendance: 8,512; Referee: (Romania) Adrian Cojocaru |

| 27 September 2024 11 | Petrolul Ploiești | 4–1 | Hermannstadt | Ploiești |
| 18:00 EEST | Ricardinho 6'; Rădulescu 11' 26'; Grozav 63' | Report | Buș 48' | Stadium: Ilie Oană Stadium; Attendance: 6,927; Referee: (Romania) Istvan Kovacs |

| 4 October 2024 12 | UTA Arad | 3–1 | Petrolul Ploiești | Arad |
| 18:00 EET | Marian Huja 32' (o.g.); Cîmpanu 38'; Attah Kadiri (red card) 44'; Hrezdac 57'; Popa (yellow card) 90'; Zsóri (yellow card) 90' | Report | Keita (yellow card) 37'; Tudorie 53'; Grozav (yellow card) 70'; Zima (yellow card) 70'; Hanca (yellow card) 90+1' | Stadium: Francisc von Neuman Stadium; Attendance: 4,000; Referee: (Romania) Horia Mladinovici |

| 19 October 2024 13 | Petrolul Ploiești | 0–0 | CFR Cluj | Ploiești |
| 21:00 EET | Jyry (yellow card) 59'; Hanca (yellow card) 70'; Papp (yellow card) 88' | Report | Michael (yellow card) 40'; Munteanu (yellow card) 74' | Stadium: Ilie Oană Stadium; Attendance: 4,300; Referee: (Romania) Marcel Bîrsan |

| 26 October 2024 14 | Petrolul Ploiești | 3–1 | Politehnica Iași | Ploiești |
| 16:00 EET | Mateiu (yellow card) 22'; Grozav 25'; Marian Huja (yellow card) 36'; Tudorie 53'; Roche (yellow card) 79'; Zima (yellow card) 79'; Bratu 88' | Report | Bordeianu 20' (yellow card) 55'; Kamberi (red card) 38'; Atanaskoski (yellow card) 49' | Stadium: Ilie Oană Stadium; Attendance: 4,600; Referee: (Romania) Sorin Vădana |

| 2 November 2024 15 | Sepsi | 1–1 | Petrolul Ploiești | Sfântu Gheorghe |
| 18:30 EET | Coman (yellow card) 18' (yellow-red card) 38'; Dumitrescu (yellow card) 25' (goal) 89'; Kallaku (red card) 25'; Mino (yellow card) 87' | Report | Dumitriu (yellow card) 27'; Tudorie 28'; Keita (yellow card) 45+3' | Stadium: Sepsi Arena Stadium; Attendance: 2,500; Referee: (Romania) Sebastian Colțescu |

| 11 November 2024 16 | Gloria Buzău | 0–1 | Petrolul Ploiești | Buzău |
| 18:00 EET | Ferraresso (yellow card) 40'; Čanađija (yellow card) 45+2' | Report | Tudorie 26'; Mateiu (yellow card) 44' | Stadium: Buzău Municipal Stadium; Attendance: 1,455; Referee: (Romania) Iuliana Demetrescu |

| 24 November 2024 17 | Petrolul Ploiești | 0–1 | Dinamo București | Ploiești |
| 20:45 EET | Marian Huja (yellow card) 26' | Report | Selmani (yellow card) 26' (goal) 31'; Milanov (yellow card) 65' | Stadium: Ilie Oană Stadium; Attendance: 6,500; Referee: (Romania) Horațiu Feșnic |

| 29 November 2024 18 | Rapid București | 1–1 | Petrolul Ploiești | Bucharest |
| 20:45 EET | Dumitriu 54' (o.g.) | Report | Tudorie (yellow card) 45' (goal) 62'; Roche (yellow card) 56'; Grozav (yellow card) 90+5'; Papp (yellow card) 90+10' | Stadium: Rapid-Giulești Stadium; Attendance: 11,719; Referee: (Romania) Florin Andrei |

| 7 December 2024 19 | Petrolul Ploiești | 1–1 | Universitatea Craiova | Ploiești |
| 20:00 EET | Tudorie 25'; Jyry (yellow card) 45'; Papp (yellow card) 68'; Dumitriu (yellow card) 88' | Report | Mora (yellow card) 49'; Baiaram 73'; Koljić (yellow card) 75' | Stadium: Ilie Oană Stadium; Attendance: 2,979; Referee: (Romania) Marian Barbu |

| 14 December 2024 20 | Universitatea Cluj | 4–1 | Petrolul Ploiești | Cluj-Napoca |
| 20:00 EET | Blănuță 51' 65'; Thiam 61'; Silaghi (yellow card) 76'; Masoero 87' | Report | Papp (yellow card) 20' (yellow-red card) 90+3' (goal) 75'; Marian Huja (yellow card) 38'; Rădulescu (yellow card) 80'; Zima (yellow card) 90+3' | Stadium: Cluj Arena; Attendance: 4,516; Referee: (Romania) Istvan Kovacs |

| 22 December 2024 21 | Petrolul Ploiești | 2–1 | Unirea Slobozia | Ploiești |
| 12:30 EET | Ricardinho 17'; Papp (yellow card) 44'; Roche (yellow card) 64'; Grozav 67' | Report | Florinel Ibrian (yellow card) 7'; Ionuț Dinu 32' | Stadium: Ilie Oană Stadium; Attendance: 3,120; Referee: (Romania) Viorel Flueran |

| 18 January 2025 22 | Oțelul Galați | 0–0 | Petrolul Ploiești | Galați |
| 19:30 EET | Stevanović (yellow card) 76'; Roșu (yellow card) 89' | Report | Marian Huja (yellow card) 30' | Stadium: Oțelul Stadium; Referee: (Romania) Horia Mladinovici |

| 27 January 2025 23 | Petrolul Ploiești | 3–1 | Botoșani | Ploiești |
| 17:00 EET | Papp (yellow card) 5'; Tolea 15' (yellow card) 30'; Grozav 19'; Hanca 24'; Bălbărău (yellow card) 77' | Report | López 85' | Stadium: Ilie Oană Stadium; Attendance: 4,480; Referee: (Romania) Horațiu Feșnic |

| 3 February 2024 24 | Farul Constanța | 2–1 | Petrolul Ploiești | Ovidiu |
| 20:00 EET | Larie (yellow card) 12'; Iancu 35' (pen.) (yellow card) 87'; Dican (yellow card) 76'; Cojocaru 88' (yellow card) 88' | Report | Jyry 45'; Papp (yellow card) 67'; Gheorghe (yellow card) 82' | Stadium: Central Stadium; Attendance: 2,100; Referee: (Romania) Marcel Bîrsan |

| 6 February 2024 25 | Petrolul Ploiești | 0–0 | FCSB | Ploiești |
| 20:30 EET | Radu (yellow card) 45+3' | Report | | Stadium: Ilie Oană Stadium; Attendance: 8,544; Referee: (Romania) Marian Barbu |

| 9 February 2024 26 | Hermannstadt | 1–1 | Petrolul Ploiești | Sibiu |
| 14:30 EET | Kujabi (yellow card) 22'; Popescu (yellow card) 68'; Ivanov (yellow card) 73'; Buș 83'; Căpușă (yellow card) 90+3' | Report | Găman 90+4' (o.g.) | Stadium: Sibiu Municipal Stadium; Attendance: 3,444; Referee: (Romania) Radu Petrescu |

| 15 February 2024 27 | Petrolul Ploiești | 0–1 | UTA Arad | Ploiești |
| 15:00 EET | Roche (yellow card) 90+6'; Hanca (yellow card) 90+9' (yellow-red card) 90+9' | Report | Harrison 17'; Danciu (yellow card) 58'; Costache (yellow card) 65'; Gorcea (yellow card) 90+2'; Zsóri (yellow card) 90+8' | Stadium: Ilie Oană Stadium; Attendance: 5,000; Referee: (Romania) Sebastian Colțescu |

| 22 February 2024 28 | CFR Cluj | 2–0 | Petrolul Ploiești | Cluj-Napoca |
| 20:30 EET | Păun (yellow card) 37'; Korenica 48'; Kamara 72' | Report | Jyry (yellow card) 68'; Grozav (yellow card) 78' | Stadium: Dr. Constantin Rădulescu Stadium; Attendance: 1,470; Referee: (Romania) Marcel Bîrsan |

| 2 March 2024 29 | Politehnica Iași | 1–0 | Petrolul Ploiești | Iași |
| 15:00 EET | Radu 45+3' (o.g.); Samayoa (yellow card) 55' | Report | Keita (yellow card) 19' | Stadium: Emil Alexandrescu Stadium; Attendance: 2,018; Referee: (Romania) Adrian Cojocaru |

| 8 March 2024 30 | Petrolul Ploiești | 1–0 | Sepsi | Ploiești |
| 18:00 EET | Papp (yellow card) 40' (goal) 72' | Report | Coman (yellow card) 37'; Mino (yellow card) 70' | Stadium: Ilie Oană Stadium; Attendance: 5,514; Referee: (Romania) Szabolcs Kovacs |

== Play-out round ==
=== Cupa României ===
| 27 August 2024 Play-off round | Dumbrăvița | 1–1 (a.e.t.) (4–5 p) | Petrolul Ploiești | Ploiești |
| 19:00 EEST | Răzvan Morariu (yellow card) 19'; Nicu Modan 63'; Răzvan Ghinescu (yellow card) 75'; Cătălin Trifon (yellow card) 98'; Cristian Pădurariu (yellow card) 110'; Alin Burdet (yellow card) 114' | Report | Tudorie 52' (yellow card) 61'; Stănică (yellow card) 67'; Keita (yellow card) 90+4' | Stadium: Ilie Oană Stadium; Referee: (Romania) Naidin Valentin |

== Group stage ==
=== Group B ===
| Pos | Team | Pld | W | D | L | GF | GA | GD | Pts | Qualification | MET | UCV | FCS | PET | DIN | AGR |
|---|---|---|---|---|---|---|---|---|---|---|---|---|---|---|---|---|
| 1 | Metalul Buzău | 3 | 2 | 1 | 0 | 4 | 0 | +4 | 7 | Advance to knockout phase | — | 1–0 | — | — | 0–0 | — |
| 2 | Universitatea Craiova | 3 | 2 | 0 | 1 | 4 | 1 | +3 | 6 | Advance to knockout phase | — | — | — | — | — | — |
| 3 | FCSB | 3 | 2 | 0 | 1 | 6 | 3 | +3 | 6 | | — | 0–2 | — | — | — | — |
| 4 | Petrolul Ploiești | 3 | 1 | 1 | 1 | 3 | 2 | +1 | 4 | | — | 0–2 | — | — | — | — |
| 5 | Dinamo București | 3 | 0 | 2 | 1 | 0 | 4 | −4 | 2 | | — | — | 0–4 | 0–0 | — | — |
| 6 | Agricola Borcea | 3 | 0 | 0 | 3 | 1 | 8 | −7 | 0 | | 0–3 | — | 1–2 | 0–3 | — | — |

Source: FRF
Legend: Blue = home team win; Yellow = draw; Red = away team win.

| 29 October 2024 Group B | Agricola Borcea | 0–3 | Petrolul Ploiești | Borcea |
| 14:30 EET | Costin Alexandru Ciochină (yellow card) 69'; Victor Militaru (yellow card) 74' | Report | Hanca 40' 45+1'; Papp (yellow card) 44'; Irobiso 58'; Radu (yellow card) 88' | Stadium: Stadionul Comunal; Referee: (Romania) Ovidiu Robu |

| 4 December 2024 Group B | Petrolul Ploiești | 0–2 | Universitatea Craiova | Ploiești |
| 20:00 EET | Roche (yellow card) 46' | Report | Oshima (yellow card) 51'; Bană 56'; Grego (yellow card) 68'; Basilio Ndong (yellow card) 81'; Houri 87' | Stadium: Ilie Oană Stadium; Referee: (Romania) Adrian Cojocaru |

| 18 December 2024 Group B | Dinamo București | 0–0 | Petrolul Ploiești | Bucharest |
| 20:00 EET | Bordușanu (yellow card) 32' | Report | Stănică (yellow card) 4' | Stadium: Arcul de Triumf Stadium; Referee: (Romania) Marcel Bîrsan |
