= List of Romanian football transfers winter 2023–24 =

This is a list of Romanian football transfers for the 2023–24 winter transfer window. Only transfers featuring SuperLiga are listed.

== SuperLiga ==
Note: Flags indicate national team as has been defined under FIFA eligibility rules. Players may hold more than one non-FIFA nationality.

=== Farul Constanța ===
In:

No.	Pos.	Nation	Player
11	DF	(Romania) ROU	Cristian Ganea (from FCSB)
23	MF	(Romania) ROU	Carlo Casap (from Botoșani)
77	MF	(Romania) ROU	Ronaldo Deaconu (from (Poland) Korona Kielce)

Out:

No.	Pos.	Nation	Player
11	MF	(Brazil) BRA	Gustavo (to (Greece) Levadiakos)
12	GK	(Romania) ROU	Marian Aioani (to Rapid București)
18	MF	(Romania) ROU	Andrei Artean (to (Cyprus) Apollon Limassol)
26	FW	(Romania) ROU	Adrian Mazilu (to (England) Brighton & Hove Albion)
32	MF	(Argentina) ARG	Marco Borgnino (to (Chile) Cobreloa)
77	FW	(Romania) ROU	Enes Sali (to (United States) Dallas)
—	MF	(Romania) ROU	Denis Bujor (on loan to Unirea Slobozia, previously on loan at Argeș Pitești)

=== FCSB ===
In:

No.	Pos.	Nation	Player
19	FW	(Brazil) BRA	Luis Phelipe (from Politehnica Iași)
20	DF	(Ghana) GHA	Nana Antwi (from (Armenia) Urartu)
42	MF	(Ghana) GHA	Baba Alhassan (from Hermannstadt)

Out:

No.	Pos.	Nation	Player
9	FW	(Italy) ITA	Andrea Compagno (to (China) Tianjin Jinmen Tiger)
24	DF	(Romania) ROU	Cristian Ganea (to Farul Constanța)
29	FW	(Romania) ROU	Dorin Rotariu (free agent)
88	MF	(Croatia) CRO	Damjan Đoković (to Rapid București)
—	MF	(Romania) ROU	Ovidiu Perianu (on loan to Gloria Buzău, previously on loan at Universitatea Cluj)
—	FW	(Romania) ROU	Ianis Stoica (to Hermannstadt, previously on loan at Universitatea Cluj)

=== CFR Cluj ===
In:

No.	Pos.	Nation	Player
3	DF	(Mauritania) MTN	Aly Abeid (from UTA Arad)
7	MF	(Morocco) MAR	Omar El Kaddouri (free agent)
12	DF	(Croatia) CRO	Petar Mamić (from (Lithuania) Žalgiris)
18	MF	(Ivory Coast) CIV	Kader Keïta (from (Turkey) Sivasspor)
20	FW	(Italy) ITA	Filippo Falco (from (Serbia) Red Star Belgrade)
22	DF	(Ukraine) UKR	Alan Aussi (from (Spain) Ponferradina B)
99	FW	(Nigeria) NGA	Peter Michael (from (Finland) VPS)

Out:

No.	Pos.	Nation	Player
2	FW	(Bosnia and Herzegovina) BIH	Luka Juričić (on loan to (Armenia) Pyunik)
3	DF	(Israel) ISR	Ziv Morgan (loan return to (Israel) Ironi Kiryat Shmona)
7	FW	(Kosovo) KOS	Ermal Krasniqi (to Rapid București)
9	FW	(Spain) ESP	Jefté Betancor (to (Greece) Panserraikos)
18	MF	(Ghana) GHA	Isaac Nortey (on loan to Argeș Pitești)
21	MF	(Romania) ROU	Luca Mihai (on loan to Politehnica Iași)
22	FW	(Ukraine) UKR	Yevhen Konoplyanka (free agent)
40	MF	(Croatia) CRO	Lovro Cvek (to (Kazakhstan) Ordabasy)
—	FW	(Romania) ROU	David Ciubăncan (on loan to CSM Deva, previously on loan at Șoimii Lipova)
—	MF	(Croatia) CRO	Josip Mihalić (to (Bulgaria) Septemvri Sofia)
—	MF	(Romania) ROU	Claudiu Petrila (to Rapid București, previously on loan)

=== Universitatea Craiova ===
In:

No.	Pos.	Nation	Player
3	DF	(Honduras) HON	Denil Maldonado (on loan from (Honduras) Motagua, previously on loan at (United States) Los Angeles)
5	MF	(Georgia (country)) GEO	Anzor Mekvabishvili (from (Georgia (country)) Dinamo Tbilisi)
7	MF	(Bosnia and Herzegovina) BIH	Zvonimir Kožulj (from (Bosnia and Herzegovina) Zrinjski Mostar)
18	DF	(Finland) FIN	Pyry Soiri (from (Finland) HJK)
24	FW	(Spain) ESP	Jalen Blesa (from (Kosovo) Prishtina)

Out:

No.	Pos.	Nation	Player
3	DF	(Senegal) SEN	Jean Baptiste Mendy (to ACB Ineu)
7	MF	(Romania) ROU	Alexandru Ișfan (on loan to Petrolul Ploiești)
17	DF	(Romania) ROU	Florin Borța (to Argeș Pitești)
24	MF	(Croatia) CRO	Ante Roguljić (on loan to Universitatea Cluj)
27	MF	(Slovenia) SVN	Jasmin Kurtić (to (Italy) Südtirol)
32	DF	(Romania) ROU	Denis Benga (on loan to Ceahlăul)
35	MF	(Romania) ROU	David Sala (on loan to Alexandria)
88	FW	(Romania) ROU	Atanas Trică (on loan to Tunari)

=== Rapid București ===
In:

No.	Pos.	Nation	Player
8	FW	(Kosovo) KOS	Florent Hasani (from (Albania) Tirana)
11	FW	(Serbia) SRB	Borisav Burmaz (from (Serbia) Voždovac)
14	MF	(Slovakia) SVK	Jakub Hromada (on loan from (Czech Republic) Slavia Prague)
16	GK	(Romania) ROU	Marian Aioani (from Farul Constanța)
27	MF	(Romania) ROU	Claudiu Petrila (from CFR Cluj, previously on loan)
77	FW	(Kosovo) KOS	Ermal Krasniqi (from CFR Cluj)
88	MF	(Croatia) CRO	Damjan Đoković (from FCSB)
—	MF	(Romania) ROU	Cătălin Vulturar (from (Italy) Lecce)

Out:

No.	Pos.	Nation	Player
10	MF	(Romania) ROU	Alexandru Ioniță (to (China) Yunnan Yukun)
11	FW	(Spain) ESP	Borja Valle (to (Spain) Ponferradina)
14	FW	(Republic of the Congo) CGO	Juvhel Tsoumou (to (Thailand) Police Tero)
17	MF	(Romania) ROU	Ștefan Pănoiu (on loan to Universitatea Cluj)
30	FW	(Romania) ROU	Alex Stan (on loan to Mioveni)
31	GK	(Romania) ROU	Horațiu Moldovan (to (Spain) Atlético Madrid)
93	FW	(Cameroon) CMR	Kévin Soni (on loan to (Israel) Hapoel Jerusalem)
—	MF	(Romania) ROU	Rareș Stanciu (on loan to Tunari)
—	MF	(Romania) ROU	Cătălin Vulturar (on loan to UTA Arad)
—	MF	(Romania) ROU	Andrei Ciobanu (to Voluntari, previously on loan at Politehnica Iași)
—	MF	(Romania) ROU	David Iordache (to Brașov, previously on loan at Cetatea Turnu Măgurele)

=== Sepsi OSK ===
In:

No.	Pos.	Nation	Player
7	FW	(Hungary) HUN	Kevin Varga (from (Cyprus) Apollon Limassol)
20	DF	(Romania) ROU	Andres Dumitrescu (on loan from (Czech Republic) Slavia Prague)

Out:

No.	Pos.	Nation	Player
8	MF	(Romania) ROU	Ion Gheorghe (to (Poland) Stal Mielec)
9	FW	(Moldova) MDA	Vitalie Damașcan (on loan to (Switzerland) Stade Lausanne Ouchy)
22	MF	(Guinea-Bissau) GNB	Francisco Júnior (free agent)
55	GK	(Romania) ROU	Rajmund Niczuly (on loan to Focșani)
91	DF	(Romania) ROU	Krisztián Dobozi (on loan to (Hungary) Kazincbarcika)

=== FC U Craiova ===
In:

No.	Pos.	Nation	Player
3	DF	(Lithuania) LTU	Rokas Lekiatas (from (Lithuania) Panevėžys)
7	DF	(Romania) ROU	Andrei Dragu (from Botoșani)
25	MF	(Algeria) ALG	Idris Bounaas (free agent)

Out:

No.	Pos.	Nation	Player
14	DF	(Netherlands) NED	Danny Henriques (to (Cyprus) AEK Larnaca)
19	DF	(Romania) ROU	Alexandru Iordache (to CSM Deva)
25	DF	(Greece) GRE	Apostolos Diamantis (to (Greece) Panserraikos)
77	MF	(Togo) TOG	Samuel Asamoah (free agent)
98	DF	(Romania) ROU	Alexandru Vodă (to Mediaș)

=== Petrolul Ploiești ===
In:

No.	Pos.	Nation	Player
1	GK	(Romania) ROU	Raul Bălbărău (free agent)
6	MF	(Finland) FIN	Tommi Jyry (from (Finland) Inter Turku)
9	FW	(Kosovo) KOS	Albin Berisha (from (Kosovo) Ballkani)
17	MF	(Romania) ROU	David Paraschiv (from Academia Sport Team)
19	FW	(Nigeria) NGA	Christian Irobiso (on loan from (Saudi Arabia) Al-Ula)
31	MF	(Romania) ROU	Alexandru Ișfan (on loan from Universitatea Craiova)

Out:

No.	Pos.	Nation	Player
1	GK	(Romania) ROU	George Gavrilaș (to Metaloglobus)
6	MF	(Brazil) BRA	Jefferson (to (Turkey) Boluspor)
9	FW	(Algeria) ALG	Billel Omrani (to (Poland) Wisła Kraków)
10	FW	(Romania) ROU	Mihai Roman (to (Uzbekistan) Neftchi Fergana)
14	MF	(Romania) ROU	David Vraciu (to (Georgia (country)) Kolkheti Poti)
17	FW	(Montenegro) MNE	Zoran Petrović (to (Uzbekistan) Sogdiana Jizzakh)
23	MF	(Georgia (country)) GEO	Giorgi Abuashvili (to (Georgia (country)) Kolkheti Poti)
27	DF	(Guinea-Bissau) GNB	Pedro Justiniano (loan return to (Poland) Radomiak Radom)
41	MF	(Romania) ROU	Mihnea Rădulescu (on loan to Gloria Buzău)
93	MF	(Romania) ROU	Zoran Mitrov (to Botoșani)
—	MF	(Romania) ROU	Vlad Prejmerean (to Gloria Buzău, previously on loan at Chindia Târgoviște)

=== Voluntari ===
In:

No.	Pos.	Nation	Player
26	DF	(Romania) ROU	Grigore Turda (from Argeș Pitești)
28	MF	(Argentina) ARG	Bautista Cascini (from (Croatia) Slaven Belupo)
38	MF	(Suriname) SUR	Yahcuroo Roemer (free agent)
80	MF	(Romania) ROU	Andrei Ciobanu (from Rapid București, previously on loan at Politehnica Iași)

Out:

No.	Pos.	Nation	Player
19	MF	(Bosnia and Herzegovina) BIH	Luka Božičković (to (Bosnia and Herzegovina) Sloga Meridian)
31	GK	(Romania) ROU	Valentin Mărgărit (to Tunari)
—	MF	(Mexico) MEX	Omar Govea (to (Mexico) Monterrey, previously on loan)

=== Universitatea Cluj ===
In:

No.	Pos.	Nation	Player
2	DF	(Brazil) BRA	Thalisson (from (Brazil) Mirassol)
8	MF	(Brazil) BRA	Roger (from (Saudi Arabia) Al-Taraji)
18	MF	(Romania) ROU	Marco Rus (on loan from (England) Coventry City, previously on loan at (England) Chorley)
24	MF	(Croatia) CRO	Ante Roguljić (on loan from Universitatea Craiova)
30	GK	(Lithuania) LTU	Edvinas Gertmonas (from (Lithuania) Žalgiris)
32	FW	(Argentina) ARG	Federico Anselmo (from (Argentina) Quilmes)
71	MF	(Romania) ROU	Ștefan Pănoiu (on loan from Rapid București)

Out:

No.	Pos.	Nation	Player
5	DF	(Romania) ROU	Bogdan Vătăjelu (to (Kazakhstan) Aktobe)
6	DF	(Romania) ROU	Andrei Miron (to Botoșani)
7	FW	(Romania) ROU	Ianis Stoica (loan return to FCSB)
8	MF	(Romania) ROU	Andreias Calcan (to (Bulgaria) Cherno More)
16	MF	(Romania) ROU	Ioan Filip (to Botoșani)
18	MF	(Romania) ROU	Ovidiu Perianu (loan return to FCSB)
45	FW	(Netherlands) NED	Elvis Manu (free agent)
59	MF	(Romania) ROU	Doru Popadiuc (to (Hungary) Diósgyőr)
97	FW	(Romania) ROU	Albert Hofman (on loan to Unirea Dej)
—	MF	(Romania) ROU	Rareș Scocîlcă (on loan to SCM Zalău, previously on loan at Unirea Dej)

=== Hermannstadt ===
In:

No.	Pos.	Nation	Player
7	FW	(Romania) ROU	Ianis Stoica (from FCSB, previously on loan at Universitatea Cluj)
9	FW	(France) FRA	Kablan N'Goma (from Botoșani)
28	DF	(Romania) ROU	Raul Opruț (on loan from (Belgium) Kortrijk)
—	MF	(Romania) ROU	Alexandru Luca (from Șelimbăr)

Out:

No.	Pos.	Nation	Player
7	MF	(Romania) ROU	Petrișor Petrescu (on loan to Argeș Pitești)
8	MF	(Ghana) GHA	Baba Alhassan (to FCSB)
9	FW	(Romania) ROU	Adrian Petre (to Tunari)
—	MF	(Romania) ROU	Alexandru Luca (on loan to Mediaș)
—	MF	(Ghana) GHA	Baba Ayinie (on loan to Șelimbăr, previously on loan at Mediaș)

=== Botoșani ===
In:

No.	Pos.	Nation	Player
1	GK	(Bosnia and Herzegovina) BIH	Luka Kukić (from (Uzbekistan) Buxoro)
4	DF	(Romania) ROU	Andrei Miron (from Universitatea Cluj)
5	DF	(Romania) ROU	Daniel Celea (from (Cyprus) Nea Salamis)
10	FW	(Argentina) ARG	Juan Cruz Kaprof (from (Argentina) Sarmiento)
11	FW	(Germany) GER	Reagy Ofosu (from UTA Arad)
16	MF	(Romania) ROU	Ioan Filip (from Universitatea Cluj)
19	FW	(Italy) ITA	Francesco Margiotta (from (Italy) Sestri Levante)
24	DF	(Bulgaria) BUL	Radoslav Dimitrov (free agent)
27	FW	(Argentina) ARG	Enzo López (from (Ecuador) Deportivo Cuenca)
83	MF	(Angola) ANG	Aldaír (from (Lithuania) Džiugas)
88	MF	(Romania) ROU	Lóránd Fülöp (free agent)
93	MF	(Romania) ROU	Zoran Mitrov (from Petrolul Ploiești)

Out:

No.	Pos.	Nation	Player
10	FW	(France) FRA	Kablan N'Goma (to Hermannstadt)
23	DF	(Romania) ROU	Andrei Dragu (to FC U Craiova)
98	MF	(Romania) ROU	Carlo Casap (to Farul Constanța)

=== UTA Arad ===
In:

No.	Pos.	Nation	Player
18	MF	(Romania) ROU	Cătălin Vulturar (on loan from Rapid București)

Out:

No.	Pos.	Nation	Player
11	FW	(Germany) GER	Reagy Ofosu (to Botoșani)
18	DF	(Mauritania) MTN	Aly Abeid (to CFR Cluj)

=== Politehnica Iași ===
In:

No.	Pos.	Nation	Player
8	MF	(Romania) ROU	Luca Mihai (on loan from CFR Cluj)

Out:

No.	Pos.	Nation	Player
7	MF	(Romania) ROU	Andrei Ciobanu (loan return to Rapid București)
21	FW	(Brazil) BRA	Luis Phelipe (to FCSB)

=== Oțelul Galați ===
In:

No.	Pos.	Nation	Player

Out:

No.	Pos.	Nation	Player

=== Dinamo București ===
In:

No.	Pos.	Nation	Player

Out:

No.	Pos.	Nation	Player

== See also ==
- 2023–24 Liga I
