= 2023–24 FC Petrolul Ploiești season =

FC Petrolul Ploiești
2023–24 season
- Owner: Marian Copilu
- Chairman: Claudiu Tudor
- Head coach: Florin Pârvu
- Stadium: Ilie Oană Stadium
- Liga I: 8th
- Cupa României: Pre-season
- Average home league attendance: 7,588
- Biggest win: 2-0 FC Rapid
- Biggest defeat: 0-2 FC Voluntari
Home colours	Away colours	Third colours

The 2023–24 season is FC Petrolul Ploiești's 99th season in existence and second consecutive in the Liga I. They will also compete in the Cupa României.

== Players ==
=== First-team squad ===
As of 6 February 2024

Note: Flags indicate national team as defined under FIFA eligibility rules; some limited exceptions apply. Players may hold more than one non-FIFA nationality.

No.	Pos.	Nation	Player
2	DF	POR	Marian Huja
3	DF	NED	Bart Meijers (Vice-captain)
4	DF	ROU	Paul Papp
5	DF	ROU	Valentin Țicu (Captain)
6	MF	FIN	Tommi Jyry
7	FW	ROU	Gheorghe Grozav (4th captain)
8	MF	BRA	Jair
9	FW	ROU	Mihai Roman
10	MF	ROU	Mario Bratu
11	MF	JPN	Takayuki Seto (3rd captain)
12	GK	ROU	Mihai Eșanu
13	FW	ROU	Iustin Răducan
17	MF	ROU	David Paraschiv
19	FW	NGR	Christian Irobiso (on loan from Al-Ula)

No.	Pos.	Nation	Player
20	DF	ROU	Sergiu Hanca
22	DF	ROU	Denis Radu (on loan from Politehnica Timișoara)
24	FW	ROU	Raul Bucur
31	MF	ROU	Alexandru Ișfan (on loan from Universitatea Craiova)
34	DF	BRA	Guilherme Garutti
35	GK	ROU	Andrei Jercălău
38	GK	CZE	Lukáš Zima
44	MF	ROU	Lucian Dumitriu
71	DF	CIV	Seniko Doua
82	MF	CIV	Ismaël Diomandé
95	MF	ROU	Mihai Constantinescu
97	MF	ROU	Augustin Dumitrache
99	MF	ROU	Alexandru Musi (on loan from FCSB)
—	FW	KOS	Albin Berisha

== Transfers ==
=== In ===
No.	Pos.	Player	Transferred from	Fee	Date
	MF	(Romania) Alexandru Musi	(Romania) FCSB	Loan	1 July 2023
	FW	(Romania) Ionuț Cojocaru	(Romania) Farul Constanta	Loan	1 July 2023
	FW	(Romania) Iustin Raducan	(Romania) CSA Steaua Bucuresti	Free Transfer	1 July 2023
	GK	(Romania) Mihai Eșanu	(Romania) Chindia Târgoviște	Free Transfer	1 July 2023
	GK	(Romania) George Gavrilas	(Romania) Metaloglobus București	Free Transfer	1 July 2023
	FW	(Montenegro) Zoran Petrović	(Montenegro) Buducnost Podgorica	Free Transfer	1 July 2023
	GK	(Czech Republic) Lukas Zima	(Netherlands) VVV-Venlo	Free Transfer	1 July 2023
	DF	(Brazil) Guilherme Garutti	(Romania) CS Mioveni	Free Transfer	1 July 2023
	FW	(Romania) Sergiu Hanca	(Romania) Universitatea Craiova	Free Transfer	1 July 2023
	FW	(Romania) Zoran Mitrov	(Romania) FC Brașov	€10,000	1 July 2023
	DF	(Guinea-Bissau) Pedro Justiniano	(Poland) Radomiak Radom	Loan	2 July 2023
	FW	(Romania) Mihai Roman II	(Romania) FC Botosani	Free Transfer	23 August 2023
	DF	(Romania) Denis Radu	(Romania) Poli Timisoara	Loan	29 August 2023
	FW	(Georgia (country)) Giorgi Abuashvili	(Portugal) FC Porto B	€150,000	30 August 2023
	MF	(Finland) Tommi Jyry	(Finland) Inter Turku	Free Transfer	6 February 2024

=== Out ===
No.	Pos.	Player	Transferred to	Fee	Date
	GK	(Romania) Octavian Vâlceanu	FC Voluntari	End of loan	30 June 2023
	DF	(Romania) Florin Borța	Universitatea Craiova	End of loan	30 June 2023
	DF	(Romania) Ricardo Grigore	FC Dinamo Bucuresti	End of loan	30 June 2023
	MF	(Romania) Vlad Prejmeran	Chindia Târgoviște	Free Transfer	1 July 2023
	FW	(Romania) Dragoș Gheorghe	CS Tunari	Free Transfer	1 July 2023
	GK	(Austria) Andreas Leitner	SV Ried	Free Transfer	1 July 2023
	DF	(Romania) Antoniu Manolache	Corvinul Hunedoara	Free Transfer	1 July 2023
	DF	(Romania) Alexandru Sabau	CSM Resita	Loan	1 July 2023
	MF	(Romania) Mihai Nitescu	CSM Alexandria	Loan	3 July 2023
	FW	(Romania) Robert Moldoveanu	Chindia Târgoviște	Free Transfer	11 July 2023
	DF	(Romania) Mihai Velisar	Corvinul Hunedoara	Free Transfer	13 July 2023
	FW	(Romania) Alexandru Saim Tudor	FC Brașov	Free Transfer	26 July 2023
	FW	(Romania) Alin Botogan	Chindia Târgoviște	Loan	26 July 2023
	GK	(Romania) Andrei Jercălău	Cetatea Turris Turnu Magurele	Loan	27 July 2023
	FW	(Romania) Vlad Bogdan	Metaloglobus București	Loan	31 July 2023
	MF	(Romania) Cristian Lixandru	CS Tunari	Loan	1 August 2023
	MF	(Romania) Constantin Budescu	Farul Constanta	Free Transfer	4 August 2023
	DF	(Cape Verde) Félix Mathaus	PAE Chania	Free Transfer	1 September 2023
	FW	(Nigeria) Christian Irobiso	Al-Ula	€125,000	5 September 2023
	FW	(Romania) Ionuț Cojocaru	Farul Constanta	End of loan	5 September 2023
	DF	(Bulgaria) Georgi Pashov	FC Buzău	Free Transfer	6 September 2023
	MF	(Serbia) Stefan Purtić	Free Agent		12 September 2023

=== Overall transfer activity ===
==== Expenditure ====
Summer:▼€160,000

Winter:▼

Total:▼€160,000

==== Income ====
Summer: ▲€125,000

Winter: ▲

Total:▲€125,000

==== Net Totals ====
Summer: ▼€35,000

Winter:

Total: ▼€35,000

== Pre-season and friendlies ==
22 June 2023 Friendly	Petrolul Ploiești (Romania)	2–3	(North Macedonia) Shkëndija	Rogla, Slovenia
17:30 UTC+2				Stadium: Štadion Rogla

26 June 2023 Friendly	Petrolul Ploiești (Romania)	0–5	(Bosnia and Herzegovina) Sarajevo	Slovenske Konjice, Slovenia
18:00 UTC+2				Stadium: Štadion Dobrava

30 June 2023 Friendly	Aluminij (Slovenia)	0–0	(Romania) Petrolul Ploiești	Kidričevo, Slovenia
17:30 UTC+2				Stadium: Športni Park Aluminij

4 July 2023 Friendly	Panathinaikos (Greece)	2–0	(Romania) Petrolul Ploiești	Mattersburg, Austria
18:00 UTC+2				Stadium: Pappelstadion

5 July 2023 Friendly	Petrolul Ploiești (Romania)	1–1	(Croatia) Osijek	Križevci, Croatia
17:30 UTC+2				Stadium: Gradski Stadion

== Competitions ==
=== Overall record ===
Competition	First match	Last match	Starting round	Final position	Record							
Competition	First match	Last match	Starting round	Final position	Pld	W	D	L	GF	GA	GD	Win %
Liga I Regular season	16 July 2023	8 March 2024	Matchday 1	10th	30	7	14	9	29	32	−3	23.33
Liga I Play-out round	18 March 2024	12 May 2024	Matchday 1	5th	9	3	2	4	8	14	−6	33.33
Cupa României	27 September 2023	7 December 2023	Group stage	Group stage	3	2	1	0	6	3	+3	66.67
Total					42	12	17	13	43	49	−6	28.57

Source: Soccerway

=== Liga I ===
==== Regular season ====
Pos	Team	Pld	W	D	L	GF	GA	GD	Pts	Qualification
8	UTA Arad	30	10	10	10	36	43	−7	40 (Note: Head to head points: UTA 3 (+1), Hermannstadt 3 (-1))	Qualification to play-out round
9	Hermannstadt	30	9	13	8	36	31	+5	40	Qualification to play-out round
10	Petrolul Ploiești	30	7	14	9	29	32	−3	35	Qualification to play-out round
11	Oțelul Galați	30	6	16	8	31	36	−5	34	Qualification to play-out round
12	Politehnica Iași	30	7	12	11	33	44	−11	33	Qualification to play-out round

Source: , Soccerway
Rules for classification: 1) Points; 2) Head-to-head points; 3) Head-to-head goal difference; 4) Head-to-head goals scored; 5) Goal difference; 6) Goals scored; 7) Play-off.

==== Results summary ====
Overall								Home						Away					
Pld	W	D	L	GF	GA	GD	Pts	W	D	L	GF	GA	GD	W	D	L	GF	GA	GD
30	7	14	9	29	32	−3	35	5	6	4	21	21	0	2	8	5	8	11	−3

Source: SuperLiga

==== Results by round ====
Round	1	2	3	4	5	6	7	8
Ground	H	A	H	H	A	H	A	H
Result	D	D	L	W	W	W	D	D
Position	8	9	12	9	5	3	4	5

Source: SuperLiga
A = Away; H = Home; W = Win; D = Draw; L = Loss

==== Matches ====
The league fixtures were unveiled on 27 June 2023.

16 July 2023 1	Petrolul Ploiești	1–1	Universitatea Cluj	Ploiești
18:30 UTC+3	Musi 30'; Budescu (penalty missed) 59'		Chipciu 14'; Pițian (yellow card) 58'; Nistor (yellow card) 60'	Stadium: Ilie Oană Stadium; Referee: Marcel Bîrsan

==== Play-out round ====
Pos	Team	Pld	W	D	L	GF	GA	GD	Pts	Qualification or relegation	UTA	OTE	HER	UCJ	PET	IAS	DIN	BOT	VOL	FCU
7	UTA Arad (Note: UTA Arad and Hermannstadt were ineligible to advance to the European competition play-offs because they did not receive a UEFA licence.)	9	5	2	2	15	11	+4	37			3–1	1–3					1–0	4–3	3–1
8	Oțelul Galați	9	6	1	2	11	7	+4	36	Qualification to European competition play-offs			1–0	1–0		1–0	1–0	2–0		
9	Hermannstadt	9	4	2	3	13	7	+6	34					1–1	2–0	0–1	3–0	1–1		
10	Universitatea Cluj	9	3	3	3	12	10	+2	33	Qualification to European competition play-offs	0–0				1–2	1–0	3–3	3–0		
11	Petrolul Ploiești	9	3	2	4	8	14	−6	29		1–1	2–1						1–2	0–4	1–0
12	Politehnica Iași	9	3	1	5	7	8	−1	27		0–2				2–0				3–1	0–0
13	Dinamo București (O)	9	2	4	3	10	12	−2	25	Qualification to relegation play-offs	2–0				1–1	1–0			1–1	
14	Botoșani (O)	9	4	2	3	11	11	0	25	Qualification to relegation play-offs						2–1	2–1		0–0	4–1
15	Voluntari (R)	9	2	4	3	11	10	+1	24	Relegation to Liga II		1–1	1–0	0–1						0–0
16	FCU 1948 Craiova (R)	9	1	3	5	8	16	−8	22	Relegation to Liga II		1–2	1–3	3–2			1–1			

Source: Soccerway, FRF (in Romanian), LPF (in Romanian)
Legend: Blue = home team win; Yellow = draw; Red = away team win.
Rules for classification: 1) Points; 2) Points without rounding; 3) Points in the regular season; 4) Head-to-head points; 5) Head-to-head goal difference; 6) Head-to-head goals scored; 7) Goal difference; 8) Goals scored; 9) Play-off (only if needed to decide teams for relegation). (Note: only criteria 7 and 8 are applied to establish the classification during the competition.)
(O) Play-off winners; (R) Relegated

=== Cupa României ===
27 September 2023 1	Progresul Pecica	1–2	Petrolul Ploiești	Pecica
14:00	Ewald Wild (red card) 17'; Abdullahi Nasiru 43'		Roman 19', 54'	Stadium: Progresul; Referee: Dan Buzarnescu

31 October 2023 2	Chindia Târgoviște	0–2	Petrolul Ploiești	Târgoviște
18:00			Abuashvili 20'; Huja 88'	Stadium: Eugen Popescu; Referee: George Cătălin Găman

7 December 2023 3	Petrolul Ploiești	2–2	Sepsi OSK	Ploiești
17:00	Musi 24'; Marian Huja 63'		Ciobotariu 45'; Gheorghe 48'	Stadium: Ilie Oană; Referee: Claudiu Marcu
