= Mihai Eșanu =

Romanian professional footballer

Personal information
- Full name: Mihai Alexandru Eșanu
- Date of birth: 25 July 1998 (age 28)
- Place of birth: Bucharest, Romania
- Height: 1.88 m (6 ft 2 in)
- Position: Goalkeeper

Youth career
- –2016: Dinamo București

Senior career*
Years	Team	Apps	(Gls)
2016–2017	Dinamo II București		
2018–2022	Dinamo București	39	(0)
2018	→ Balotești (loan)	9	(0)
2019	→ Daco-Getica București (loan)	0	(0)
2020	→ Farul Constanța (loan)	0	(0)
2022–2023	Chindia Târgoviște	0	(0)
2023–2025	Petrolul Ploiești	1	(0)
- * Club domestic league appearances and goals as of 3 February 2025

Mihai Alexandru Eșanu (born 25 July 1998) is a Romanian professional footballer who plays as a goalkeeper.

He made his debut in Liga I in August 2020, for Dinamo București, in a game against Concordia Chiajna.

== Career statistics ==
As of match played 3 February 2025

Appearances and goals by club, season and competition
Club	Season	League			Cupa României		Europe		Other		Total	
Club	Season	Division	Apps	Goals	Apps	Goals	Apps	Goals	Apps	Goals	Apps	Goals
Balotesti (loan)	2017–18	Liga II	9	0	—		—		—		9	0
Dinamo București	2020–21	Liga I	20	0	3	0	—		—		23	0
Dinamo București	2021–22	Liga I	19	0	2	0	—		2 (Note: Appearances in Liga I promotion/relegation play-offs)	0	23	0
Dinamo București	Total		39	0	5	0	—		2	0	46	0
Chindia Târgoviște	2022–23	Liga I	0	0	1	0	—		—		1	0
Petrolul Ploiești	2023–24	Liga I	0	0	2	0	—		—		2	0
Petrolul Ploiești	2024–25	Liga I	1	0	3	0	—		—		4	0
Petrolul Ploiești	Total		1	0	5	0	—		—		6	0
Career total			49	0	11	0	0	0	2	0	62	0
