= Marian Huja =

Portuguese footballer (born 1999)

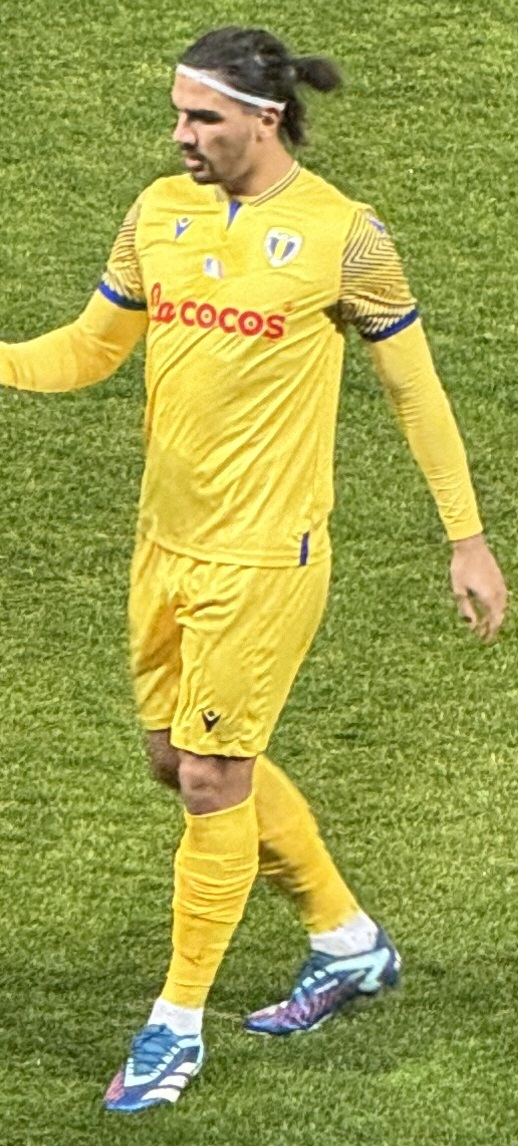
- Huja with Petrolul Ploiești in 2023

Personal information
- Full name: Marian Fernando Huja
- Date of birth: 5 August 1999 (age 27)
- Place of birth: Agualva-Cacém, Portugal
- Height: 1.93 m (6 ft 4 in)
- Position: Centre-back

Team information
- Current team: Raja CA
- Number: 2

Youth career
- 2007–2010: AC Cacém
- 2010–2015: Belenenses
- 2016–2018: Watford

Senior career*
Years	Team	Apps	(Gls)
2018–2020	HB Køge	44	(0)
2020–2025	Petrolul Ploiești	118	(5)
2025–2026	Pogoń Szczecin	15	(2)
2026	→ CFR Cluj (loan)	11	(0)
2026	CFR Cluj	0	(0)
2026–	Raja CA	0	(0)

International career
2017	Portugal U18	1	(0)
- * Club domestic league appearances and goals as of 22 May 2026

Marian Fernando Huja (born 5 August 1999) is a professional footballer who plays as a centre-back for Botola club Raja CA.

== Club career ==
=== Early career and HB Køge ===
Huja represented AC Cacém, Belenenses and Watford at junior level.

In 2018, he signed his first professional contract after a successful try-out at Danish team HB Køge. He made his senior debut for the club on 29 July that year, in a 5–2 home win over FC Roskilde in the second league.

=== Petrolul Ploiești ===
On 26 September 2020, HB Køge announced that Huja was sold to Romanian Liga II side Petrolul Ploiești. He made his competitive debut on 18 October in a 2–1 away win over Comuna Recea, and on 25 November scored his first goal in a 1–1 draw with Buzău.

In the 2021–22 season, Huja totalled 28 appearances and one goal as Petrolul Ploiești won the Liga II championship. He made his Liga I debut by starting in a 0–1 home loss to Voluntari, on 18 July 2022.

On 22 October 2023, roughly ten months after suffering an anterior cruciate ligament injury, Huja netted his first Liga I goal in a 3–1 away victory over Universitatea Craiova. Nine days later, he wore the captain armband and scored another header in a 2–0 defeat of Chindia Târgoviște in the group stage of the Cupa României.

=== Pogoń Szczecin ===
On 28 June 2025, Huja transferred to Polish club Pogoń Szczecin for a rumoured fee of €300,000 plus 20% interest. He scored his first goal on 26 July, heading a corner to level an eventual 4–1 Ekstraklasa home victory against Motor Lublin.

==== Loan to CFR Cluj ====
On 6 February 2026, Huja returned to Romania, joining Liga I club CFR Cluj on loan for the remainder of the season, with an option to buy for a fee estimated to be €250,000.

== Personal life ==
Huja was born in Portugal to Romanian parents from Oaș Country, Transylvania. He holds Romanian nationality.

== Career statistics ==
As of match played 23 July 2026

Appearances and goals by club, season and competition
Club	Season	League			National cup (Note: Includes Danish Cup, Cupa României, Polish Cup)		Continental		Other		Total	
Club	Season	Division	Apps	Goals	Apps	Goals	Apps	Goals	Apps	Goals	Apps	Goals
HB Køge	2018–19	Danish 1st Division	27	0	3	0	—		—		30	0
HB Køge	2019–20	Danish 1st Division	17	0	2	0	—		—		19	0
HB Køge	Total		44	0	5	0	0	0	0	0	49	0
Petrolul Ploiești	2020–21	Liga II	10	2	0	0	—		—		30	0
Petrolul Ploiești	2021–22	Liga II	28	1	1	0	—		—		29	1
Petrolul Ploiești	2022–23	Liga I	20	0	3	1	—		—		23	1
Petrolul Ploiești	2023–24	Liga I	24	2	3	2	—		—		27	4
Petrolul Ploiești	2024–25	Liga I	36	0	2	0	—		—		38	0
Petrolul Ploiești	Total		118	5	9	3	0	0	0	0	127	8
Pogoń Szczecin	2025–26	Ekstraklasa	15	2	1	0	—		—		16	2
CFR Cluj (loan)	2025–26	Liga I	11	0	2	0	—		—		13	0
CFR Cluj	2026–27	Liga I	0	0	—		1 (Note: Appearances in UEFA Conference League)	0	—		1	0
Raja CA	2026–27	Botola	0	0	0	0	0	0	—		0	0
Career total			188	7	17	3	1	0	0	0	206	10

== Honours ==
Petrolul Ploiești

- Liga II: 2021–22
