= Valentin Țicu =

Romanian footballer (born 2000)

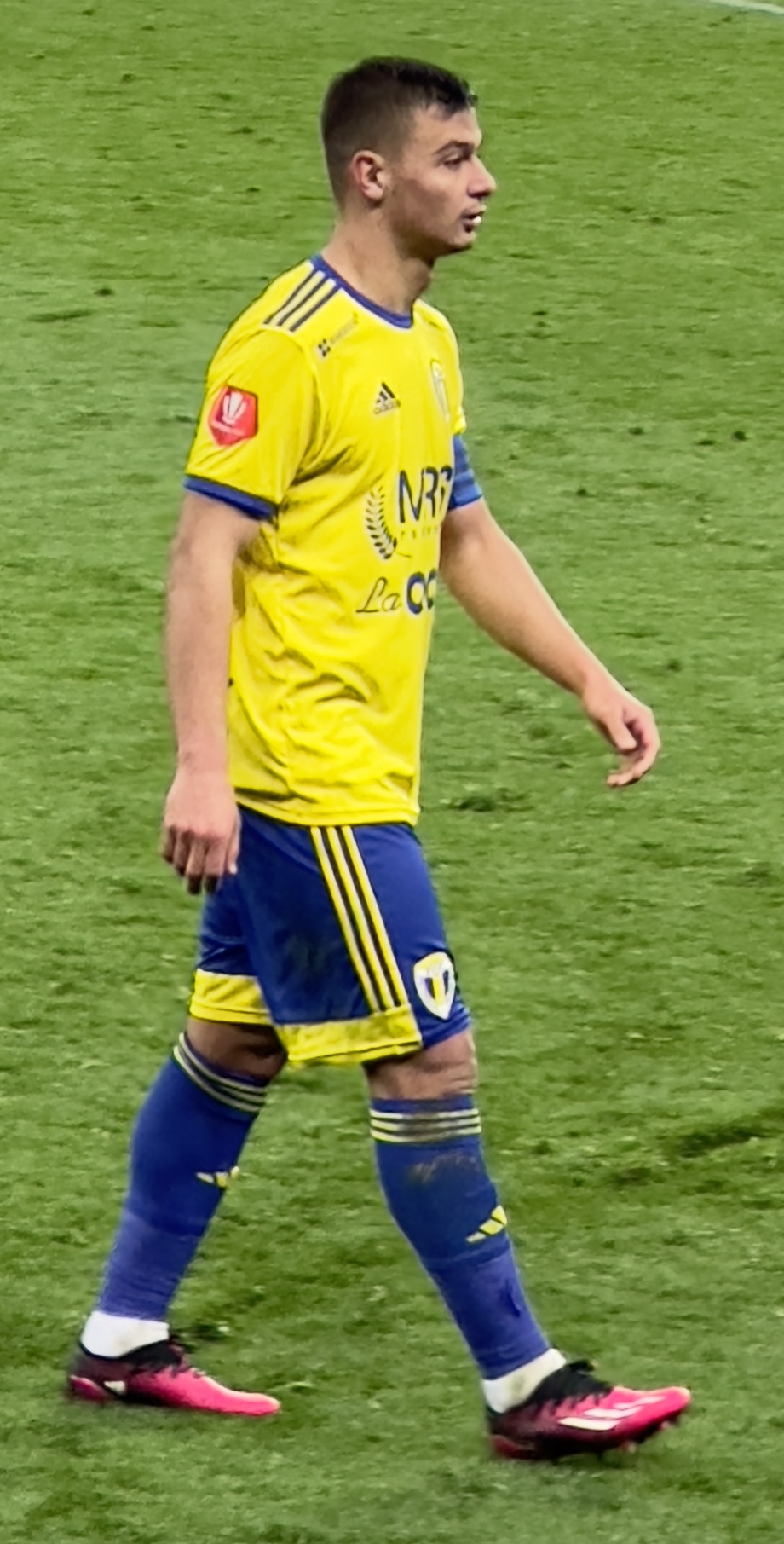
- Țicu with Petrolul Ploiești in 2023

Personal information
- Full name: Constantin Valentin Țicu
- Date of birth: 19 September 2000 (age 26)
- Place of birth: Ploiești, Romania
- Height: 1.81 m (5 ft 11 in)
- Position: Left-back

Team information
- Current team: Farul Constanța
- Number: 3

Youth career
- –2018: Petrolul Ploiești

Senior career*
Years	Team	Apps	(Gls)
2018–2025	Petrolul Ploiești	162	(8)
2026	Dinamo București	6	(0)
2026–	Farul Constanța	11	(0)

International career
2018	Romania U19	2	(0)
2021–2023	Romania U21	11	(0)
- * Club domestic league appearances and goals as of 2 November 2026

Constantin Valentin Țicu (Romanian pronunciation: [valenˈtin konstanˈtin ˈt͡siku]; born 19 September 2000) is a Romanian professional footballer who plays as a left-back for Liga I club Farul Constanța.

== Club career ==
Țicu is a youth product of Petrolul Ploiești, and made his senior debut for the club in a Liga III game against Flacăra Moreni on 30 March 2018. On 28 September that year, he registered his first Liga II appearance by playing the full 90 minutes in a 5–0 thrashing of Aerostar Bacău.

Țicu scored his first goal on 13 October 2019, in a 3–0 league win over Daco-Getica București. In the 2021–22 campaign, he gained team captaincy and aided with 26 appearances and three goals as "the Yellow-Blues" won the Liga II championship.

Țicu made his debut in the top tier by starting in a 0–1 home loss to Voluntari, on 18 July 2022. On 31 March 2023, he scored his first Liga I goal—and the only of the match—in an away victory over FC U Craiova. He was an undisputed starter during the 2022–23 season, totalling 38 league matches.

On 13 September 2023, Petrolul Ploiești announced that Țicu signed a contract extension lasting until 2026. Eleven days later, he committed a foul which left Hermannstadt player Dragoș Iancu with an ankle fracture and was handed a 16-match suspension, later reduced in half.

== International career ==
On 15 June 2023, Țicu was selected by manager Emil Săndoi in the Romania under-21 squad for the 2023 UEFA European Championship. Two days later, as a result of several injuries within the senior team squad, he was called up for a UEFA Euro 2024 qualifier against Switzerland, but did not make his debut.

== Career statistics ==
As of match played 2 November 2026

Appearances and goals by club, season and competition
Club	Season	League			Cupa României		Europe		Other		Total	
Club	Season	Division	Apps	Goals	Apps	Goals	Apps	Goals	Apps	Goals	Apps	Goals
Petrolul Ploiești	2018–19	Liga II	15	0	—		—		—		15	0
Petrolul Ploiești	2019–20	Liga II	25	1	3	0	—		—		28	1
Petrolul Ploiești	2020–21	Liga II	23	1	2	1	—		—		25	2
Petrolul Ploiești	2021–22	Liga II	26	3	0	0	—		—		26	3
Petrolul Ploiești	2022–23	Liga I	38	1	2	0	—		—		40	1
Petrolul Ploiești	2023–24	Liga I	32	1	1	0	—		—		33	1
Petrolul Ploiești	2024–25	Liga I	3	1	0	0	—		—		3	1
Petrolul Ploiești	2025–26	Liga I	0	0	0	0	—		—		0	0
Petrolul Ploiești	Total		162	8	8	1	—		—		170	9
Dinamo București	2025–26	Liga I	6	0	2	0	—		1 (Note: Appearances in Liga I European play-offs)	0	9	0
Farul Constanta	2026–27	Liga I	11	0	0	0	—		—		11	0
Career total			179	8	10	1	—		1	0	190	9

== Honours ==
Petrolul Ploiești

- Liga II: 2021–22
