= Tommi Jyry =

Finnish footballer (born 1999)

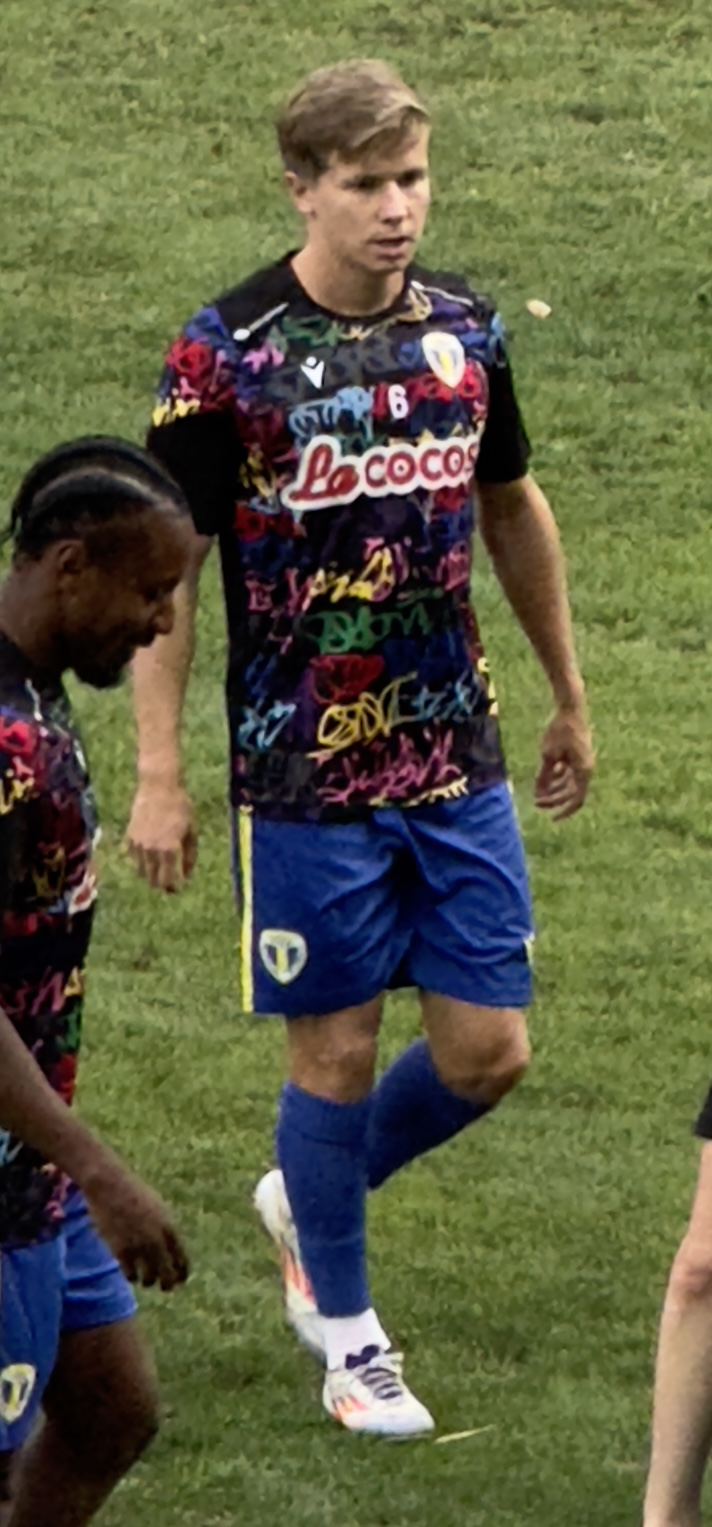
- Jyry with Petrolul Ploiești in 2024

Personal information
- Full name: Tommi Matti Jyry
- Date of birth: 16 August 1999 (age 27)
- Place of birth: Helsinki, Finland
- Height: 1.70 m (5 ft 7 in)
- Position: Central midfielder

Team information
- Current team: KuPS
- Number: 16

Youth career
- –2016: HJK

Senior career*
Years	Team	Apps	(Gls)
2017	HIFK II	2	(0)
2017–2018	HIFK	27	(1)
2019–2021	KuPS	28	(1)
2021	→ KuFu-98	3	(3)
2022–2023	Inter Turku	53	(9)
2024–2026	Petrolul Ploiești	86	(3)
2026–	KuPS	15	(2)

International career
2013	Finland U15	1	(0)
2014	Finland U16	2	(0)
- * Club domestic league appearances and goals as of 12 November 2026

Tommi Matti Jyry (born 16 August 1999) is a Finnish professional footballer who plays as a central midfielder for Veikkausliiga club KuPS.

A youth product of HJK, Jyry started his professional career at rival team HIFK in 2017. Two years later, he signed for KuPS, winning two domestic trophies during his stint. Jyry changed teams again in 2022, spending two seasons at Inter Turku where he was eventually appointed captain, before moving abroad to Romanian side Petrolul Ploiești.

== Club career ==
=== HIFK ===
Jyry was born in Ruoholahti area of Helsinki, but moved to Laajasalo with his family at an early age. He is a product of the HJK Helsinki youth academy, but started his professional career after moving to a rival club HIFK in the 2017 season, coached by Antti Muurinen. Jyry debuted in Veikkausliiga on 12 September 2017, in a Stadin derby match against his former club HJK. During his debut season, Jyry only amassed seven matches without scoring, two of which in the relegation play-offs. He also made two appearances with the club's reserve team in the fourth-tier Kolmonen.

After losing the play-offs, Jyry chose to stay with HIFK in the Ykkönen, the second tier of the Finnish league system. He made 24 league appearances during the 2018 season, and scored his first senior goal in a 2–0 away win over JJK Jyväskylä on 1 June 2018. HIFK promptly returned to the top flight after winning the 2018 Ykkönen title.

=== KuPS ===
Jyry transferred to Veikkausliiga side Kuopion Palloseura (KuPS) at the start of 2019, winning the national championship title in his first year with the club under the head coach Jani Honkavaara. During early 2020, he ruptured his achilles tendon in training and missed the entire campaign.

After recovering from injury, Jyry only totalled six league matches under new manager Simo Valakari in the 2021 season. He also played three cup matches as the club won the 2021 Finnish Cup. In addition, between May and June 2021, Jyry made three appearances and scored three goals for KuPS' farm team KuFu-98 in the third tier Kakkonen. At the conclusion of the season, he decided to leave the club.

=== Inter Turku ===
On 24 November 2021, fellow Veikkausliiga side Inter Turku announced the signing of Jyry on a two-year deal, valid from 2022. During his debut season with the club, Inter reached the finals of the Finnish Cup and the Finnish League Cup, eventually finishing second in both competitions.

Ahead of the 2023 campaign, Jyry gained team captaincy. In June 2023, he won the Veikkausliiga Player of the Month award. Following the conclusion of the season, he was handed the Anneli trophy by the Inter board of directors, traditionally granted to the most hard-working loyal player of the team.

=== Petrolul Ploiești ===
On 6 February 2024, Jyry moved abroad for the first time by signing a two-and-a-half-year contract with Romanian club Petrolul Ploiești. He made his Liga I debut on 24 February, coming on as an 85th-minute substitute for Takayuki Seto in a 1–0 away loss to UTA Arad. On 13 April, Jyry scored his first Petrolul goal in Liga I, a winning goal in a 2–1 away victory over Universitatea Cluj, a few minutes after being subbed on.

On 3 February 2025, Jyry scored his second goal for Petrolul and his first goal of the 2024–25 season, in a 2–1 away defeat against Farul Constanța.

=== Return to KuPS ===
On 16 June 2026, it was announced that Jyry will return to KuPS on a one-and-a-half year contract, for a reported €100,000 transfer fee.

== International career ==
Jyry is a former Finnish youth international, having represented his country at under-15 and under-16 levels.

On 30 May 2025, he received his first call-up to the Finland national team for the FIFA World Cup qualifying matches against the Netherlands and Poland, but did not record his debut.

== Personal life ==
Jyry's father Rasmus is a multiple Finnish champion in gymnastics, while his mother Virpi is a physical education teacher.

== Career statistics ==
As of 20 August 2026

Appearances and goals by club, season and competition
Club	Season	League			Național cup (Note: Includes Suomen Cup and Cupa României)		League cup (Note: Includes Finnish League Cup)		Europe		Other		Total	
Club	Season	Division	Apps	Goals	Apps	Goals	Apps	Goals	Apps	Goals	Apps	Goals	Apps	Goals
HIFK II	2017	Kolmonen	2	0	—		—		—		—		2	0
HIFK	2017	Veikkausliiga	3	0	2	0	—		—		2 (Note: Appearances in Veikkausliiga relegation play-offs)	0	7	0
HIFK	2018	Ykkönen	24	1	4	0	—		—		—		28	1
HIFK	Total		27	1	6	0	—		—		2	0	35	1
KuPS	2019	Veikkausliiga	22	1	4	1	—		2 (Note: Appearances in UEFA Europa League)	0	—		28	2
KuPS	2020	Veikkausliiga	0	0	1	1	—		0	0	—		1	1
KuPS	2021	Veikkausliiga	6	0	3	0	—		1 (Note: Appearances in UEFA Europa Conference League)	0	—		10	0
KuPS	Total		28	1	8	2	—		3	0	—		39	3
KuFu-98	2021	Kakkonen	3	3	—		—		—		—		3	3
Inter Turku	2022	Veikkausliiga	27	5	4	0	6	0	2	0	—		39	5
Inter Turku	2023	Veikkausliiga	26	4	1	0	6	1	—		—		33	5
Inter Turku	Total		53	9	5	0	12	1	2	0	—		72	10
Petrolul Ploiești	2023–24	Liga I	11	1	—		—		—		—		11	1
Petrolul Ploiești	2024–25	Liga I	38	1	2	0	—		—		—		40	1
Petrolul Ploiești	2025–26	Liga I	37	1	2	0	—		—		—		39	1
Petrolul Ploiești	Total		86	3	4	0	—		—		—		90	3
KuPS	2026	Veikkausliiga	4	1	—		—		7 (Note: Four appearances in UEFA Champions League, two appearances in UEFA Europa League, one appearance in UEFA Conference League)	0	—		11	1
Career total			205	18	23	2	12	1	12	0	2	0	252	21

== Honours ==
HIFK

- Ykkönen: 2018

KuPS

- Veikkausliiga: 2019
- Finnish Cup: 2021

Inter Turku

- Finnish Cup runner-up: 2022
- Finnish League Cup runner-up: 2022

Individual

- Veikkausliiga Player of the Month: June 2023
