= Lukáš Zima =

Czech footballer (born 1994)

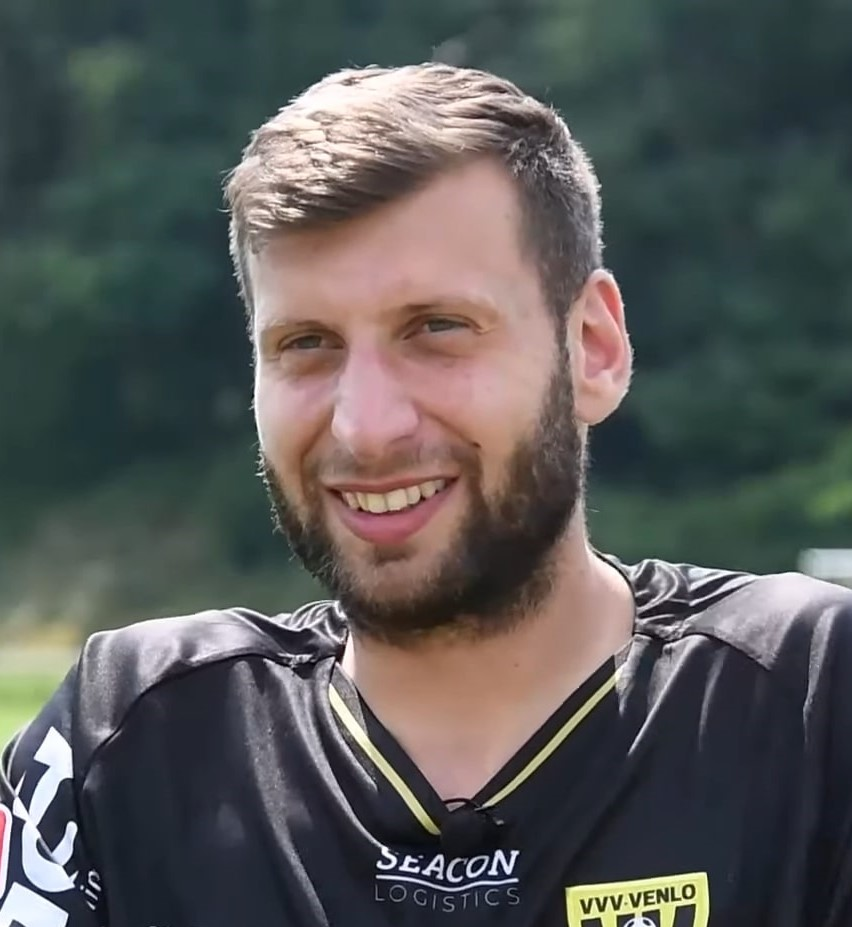
- Zima with VVV-Venlo in 2021

Personal information
- Date of birth: 9 January 1994 (age 32)
- Place of birth: Hradec Králové, Czech Republic
- Height: 1.97 m (6 ft 6 in)
- Position: Goalkeeper

Team information
- Current team: Petrolul Ploiești
- Number: 38

Youth career
- 2001–2004: MFK Nové Město nad Metují
- 2004–2009: Hradec Králové
- 2009–2011: Slavia Prague
- 2011–2014: Genoa

Senior career*
Years	Team	Apps	(Gls)
2014–2019	Genoa	0	(0)
2014	→ Reggiana (loan)	5	(0)
2014–2015	→ Venezia (loan)	11	(0)
2015	→ Mantova (loan)	9	(0)
2015–2016	→ Perugia (loan)	0	(0)
2018–2019	→ Livorno (loan)	18	(0)
2019–2020	Livorno	13	(0)
2020–2021	Genoa	0	(0)
2021–2023	VVV-Venlo	24	(0)
2023–2024	Petrolul Ploiești	59	(0)
2025–2026	FCSB	6	(0)
2026–	Petrolul Ploiești	15	(0)

International career
2010	Czech Republic U16	3	(0)
2010–2011	Czech Republic U17	14	(0)
2012	Czech Republic U18	2	(0)
2012–2013	Czech Republic U19	12	(0)
2013	Czech Republic U20	2	(0)
2014–2017	Czech Republic U21	10	(0)
- * Club domestic league appearances and goals as of 6 November 2026

Lukáš Zima (born 9 January 1994) is a Czech professional footballer who plays as a goalkeeper for Liga I club Petrolul Ploiești.

Zima spent the majority of his senior career in Italy under contract with Genoa, although he never made an official appearance and was loaned out several times. Since 2021, he has played professionally in the Netherlands and Romania.

Internationally, Zima represented the Czech Republic from under-16 up to under-21 level.

== Club career ==
=== Early career and Italy ===
Zima spent his junior years in the academies of MFK Nové Město nad Metují, Hradec Králové, Slavia Prague, and Genoa, respectively.

He made his senior debut on 23 March 2014 while on loan at Reggiana, in a 2–0 home win over Como in the Serie C. Zima spent the majority of the following five years on loan at various Serie C and Serie B teams, before Livorno exercised a full transfer option in July 2019.

In August 2020, Zima was re-signed by Genoa as a free agent, but once again failed to record his official debut for the club.

=== VVV-Venlo ===
On 13 July 2021, Zima signed a two-year contract with Dutch side VVV-Venlo. He amassed 24 appearances in the Eerste Divisie during his stint.

=== Romania ===
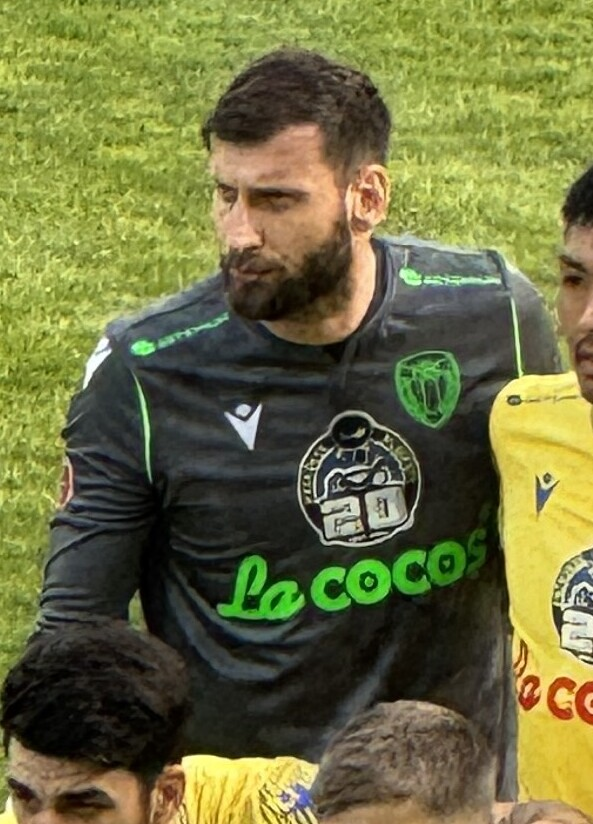
Zima with Petrolul Ploiești in 2024

After the expiration of his deal with VVV-Venlo, Zima joined Romanian club Petrolul Ploiești on 20 June 2023. In his debut campaign, he made 39 Liga I appearances and kept the second-most clean sheets (12, shared with Adnan Golubović).

On 17 October 2024, fellow Liga I team FCSB agreed a deal in advance for the transfer of Zima in the winter transfer window. He signed a three-year contract for a fee worth €250,000 plus bonuses.

Zima made his FCSB debut on 13 March 2025, starting in a UEFA Europa League round of 16 match against Olympique Lyon, which ended in a 0–4 away defeat (1–7 loss on aggregate). His only Liga I appearance of the season occurred in the final 1–1 away draw with CFR Cluj on 23 May, securing him a league champion medal.

On 17 June 2026, after appearing sparingly during his stint at FCSB, Zima returned to Petrolul Ploiești as a free agent.

== Career statistics ==
As of match played 6 November 2026

Appearances and goals by club, season and competition
Club	Season	League			National cup (Note: Includes Coppa Italia, KNVB Cup, Cupa României)		Continental		Other		Total	
Club	Season	Division	Apps	Goals	Apps	Goals	Apps	Goals	Apps	Goals	Apps	Goals
Genoa	2013–14	Serie A	0	0	0	0	—		—		0	0
Genoa	2016–17	Serie A	0	0	0	0	—		—		0	0
Genoa	2017–18	Serie A	0	0	0	0	—		—		0	0
Genoa	Total		0	0	0	0	—		—		0	0
Reggiana (loan)	2013–14	Lega Pro Prima Divisione	5	0	—		—		—		5	0
Venezia (loan)	2014–15	Lega Pro	11	0	2	0	—		—		13	0
Mantova (loan)	2014–15	Lega Pro	9	0	—		—		—		9	0
Perugia (loan)	2015–16	Serie B	0	0	0	0	—		—		0	0
Livorno (loan)	2018–19	Serie B	18	0	0	0	—		—		18	0
Livorno	2019–20	Serie B	13	0	1	0	—		—		14	0
Livorno	Total		31	0	1	0	—		—		32	0
Genoa	2020–21	Serie A	0	0	0	0	—		—		0	0
VVV-Venlo	2021–22	Eerste Divisie	17	0	0	0	—		—		17	0
VVV-Venlo	2022–23	Eerste Divisie	7	0	1	0	—		0	0	8	0
VVV-Venlo	Total		24	0	1	0	—		0	0	25	0
Petrolul Ploiești	2023–24	Liga I	39	0	1	0	—		—		40	0
Petrolul Ploiești	2024–25	Liga I	20	0	0	0	—		—		20	0
Petrolul Ploiești	Total		59	0	1	0	—		—		60	0
FCSB	2024–25	Liga I	1	0	—		1 (Note: Appearance in UEFA Europa League)	0	—		2	0
FCSB	2025–26	Liga I	4	0	2	0	2	0	0	0	8	0
FCSB	Total		5	0	2	0	3	0	0	0	10	0
Petrolul Ploiești	2026–27	Liga I	15	0	1	0	—		—		16	0
Career total			159	0	8	0	3	0	0	0	180	0

== Honours ==
FCSB

- Liga I: 2024–25
- Supercupa României: 2025
