= Alexandru Ișfan =

Romanian footballer (born 2000)

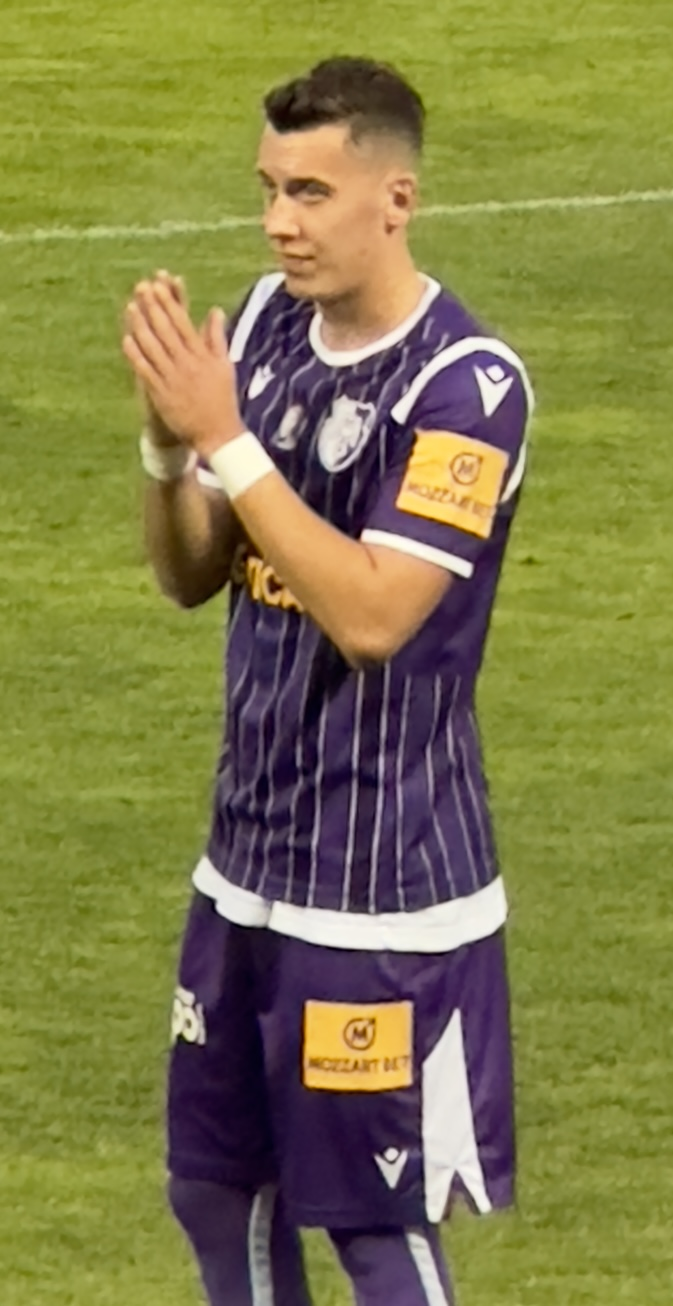
- Ișfan with Argeș Pitești in 2022

Personal information
- Full name: Mihai Alexandru Ișfan
- Date of birth: 31 January 2000 (age 26)
- Place of birth: Mioveni, Romania
- Height: 1.88 m (6 ft 2 in)
- Position: Winger

Team information
- Current team: Oviedo
- Number: 24

Youth career
- –2016: Școala de Fotbal Dănuț Coman
- 2014–2016: → Mioveni (loan)
- 2016–2018: Mioveni

Senior career*
| Years | Team | Apps | (Gls) |
| 2018–2021 | Mioveni | 60 | (8) |
| 2018 | → Unirea Bascov (loan) | | |
| 2021–2023 | Argeș Pitești | 60 | (7) |
| 2023–2025 | Universitatea Craiova | 24 | (0) |
| 2024 | → Petrolul Ploiești (loan) | 18 | (0) |
| 2024–2025 | → Gloria Buzău (loan) | 28 | (2) |
| 2025–2026 | Farul Constanța | 38 | (10) |
| 2026– | Oviedo | 8 | (0) |

International career^{‡}
| 2021–2023 | Romania U21 | 7 | (0) |
- * Club domestic league appearances and goals as of 14 November 2026 ‡ National team caps and goals as of 28 June 2023

Mihai Alexandru Ișfan (born 31 January 2000) is a Romanian professional footballer who plays as a winger for Segunda División club Oviedo.

== Club career ==
=== Mioveni ===
Ișfan made his senior debut for his hometown club Mioveni on 9 March 2019, in a 0–2 loss to Metaloglobus București in the Liga II championship. He registered his first goal in the competition on 15 May that year, scoring in a 6–0 away thrashing of Dacia Unirea Brăila.

=== Argeș Pitești ===
On 20 April 2021, Ișfan signed with nearby Liga I team Argeș Pitești for a rumoured transfer fee of €50,000, with Mioveni also retaining 45% interest on the capital gain of a potential future sale. He made his professional debut on 17 July by starting in a 0–1 league loss to Universitatea Craiova.

In the winter transfer window of 2022, four-time defending champions CFR Cluj were interested in acquiring Ișfan, but a deal could not be agreed upon. He went on to amass 43 games and four goals in all competitions during his first season with "the White-Violets", as they finished on the sixth place overall in the league table.

On 29 July 2022, amid rumours of transfer bids from Universitatea Craiova and FCSB, Ișfan netted his first career double in a 3–1 Liga I defeat of recently promoted Universitatea Cluj. On 9 August, it was announced that FC Argeș acquired his remaining ownership rights for an undisclosed fee.

=== Universitatea Craiova ===
On 4 January 2023, Ișfan was transferred to Universitatea Craiova for a rumoured fee of €650,000 plus 25% interest. He signed a three-and-a-half-year deal with the option of another year with the Alb-albaștrii.

Ișfan played 16 matches during the remainder of the season, of which 13 as a starter, but failed to score any goals. His poor form continued, and on 17 January 2024 was sent on a one-and-a-half-year loan to fellow Liga I club Petrolul Ploiești.

After his spell at Petrolul was cut short, Ișfan joined newly promoted Gloria Buzău on loan for the 2024–25 season, scoring twice as the club suffered immediate relegation to Liga II.

=== Farul Constanța ===
Ișfan transferred to Farul Constanța from Universitatea Craiova on 9 July 2025. During his first and only season, he recorded eleven goals and four assists across all competitions.

=== Oviedo ===
On 11 July 2026, Ișfan moved abroad for the first time by signing a two-year deal with Segunda División club Real Oviedo. Romanian media variously reported the transfer as worth between €200,000 and €800,000, with Universitatea Craiova entitled to part of the fee.

== Career statistics ==
As of match played 7 November 2026

Appearances and goals by club, season and competition
| Club | Season | League | | | Cupa României | | Continental | | Other | | Total | |
| Club | Season | Division | Apps | Goals | Apps | Goals | Apps | Goals | Apps | Goals | Apps | Goals |
|---|---|---|---|---|---|---|---|---|---|---|---|---|
| Mioveni | 2018–19 | Liga II | 10 | 2 | — | | — | | — | | 10 | 2 |
| Mioveni | 2019–20 | Liga II | 22 | 1 | 2 | 0 | — | | 2 (Note: Appearances in Liga I promotion/relegation play-offs) | 0 | 26 | 1 |
| Mioveni | 2020–21 | Liga II | 28 | 5 | 0 | 0 | — | | 2 | 0 | 30 | 5 |
| Mioveni | Total | | 60 | 8 | 2 | 0 | — | | 4 | 0 | 66 | 8 |
| Argeș Pitești | 2021–22 | Liga I | 39 | 3 | 4 | 1 | — | | — | | 43 | 4 |
| Argeș Pitești | 2022–23 | Liga I | 21 | 4 | 3 | 0 | — | | — | | 24 | 4 |
| Argeș Pitești | Total | | 60 | 7 | 7 | 1 | — | | — | | 67 | 8 |
| Universitatea Craiova | 2022–23 | Liga I | 16 | 0 | — | | — | | — | | 16 | 0 |
| Universitatea Craiova | 2023–24 | Liga I | 8 | 0 | 3 | 0 | — | | — | | 11 | 0 |
| Universitatea Craiova | Total | | 24 | 0 | 3 | 0 | — | | — | | 27 | 0 |
| Petrolul Ploiești (loan) | 2023–24 | Liga I | 17 | 0 | — | | — | | — | | 17 | 0 |
| Petrolul Ploiești (loan) | 2024–25 | Liga I | 1 | 0 | — | | — | | — | | 1 | 0 |
| Petrolul Ploiești (loan) | Total | | 18 | 0 | — | | — | | — | | 18 | 0 |
| Gloria Buzău (loan) | 2024–25 | Liga I | 28 | 2 | 1 | 0 | — | | — | | 29 | 2 |
| Farul Constanța | 2025–26 | Liga I | 38 | 10 | 1 | 0 | — | | 2 | 1 | 41 | 11 |
| Oviedo | 2026–27 | Segunda División | 7 | 0 | 1 | 1 | — | | — | | 8 | 1 |
| Career total | | | 235 | 27 | 15 | 2 | — | | 6 | 1 | 256 | 30 |
