= Denis Radu =

Romanian footballer (born 2003)

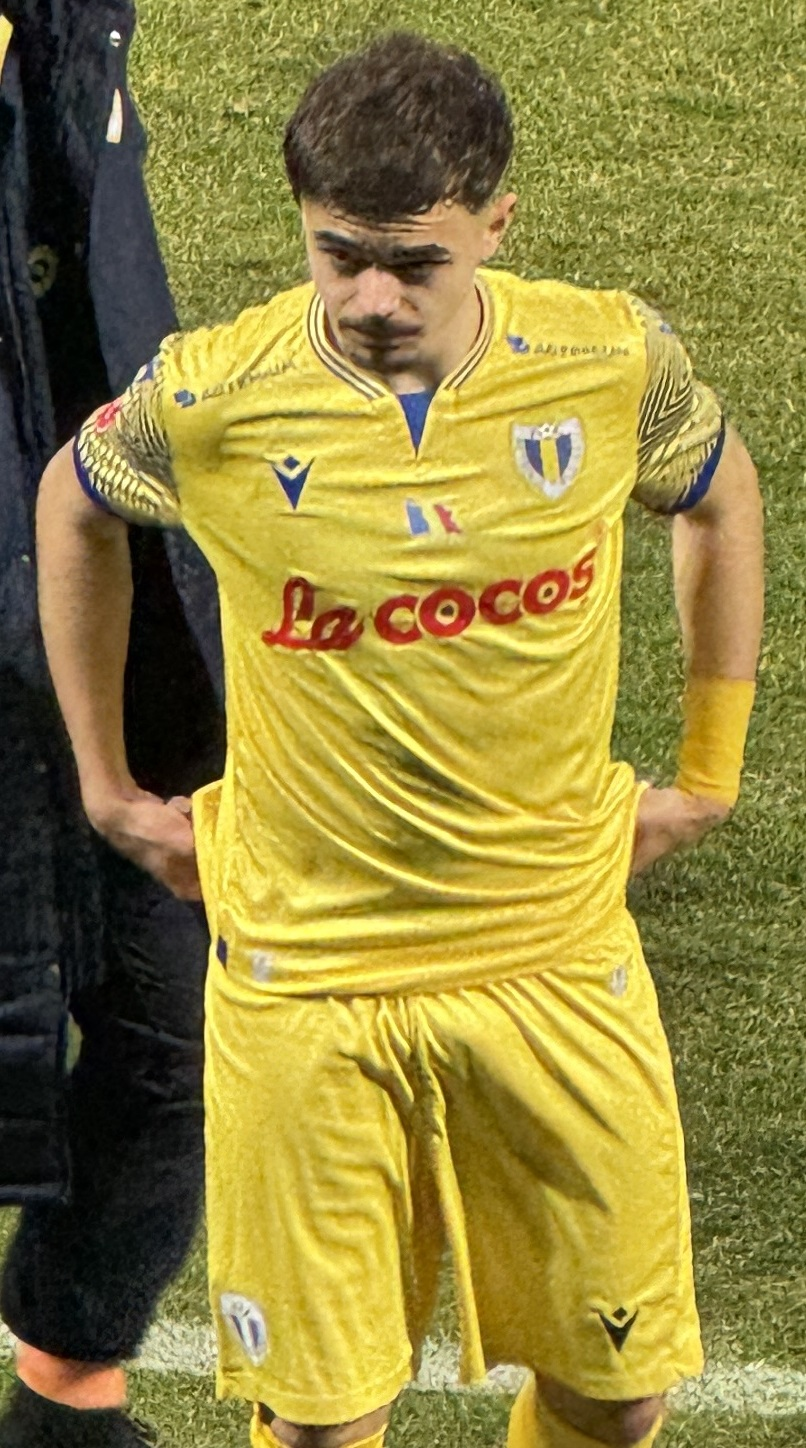
- Radu with Petrolul Ploiești in 2024

Personal information
- Full name: Denis Răzvan Radu
- Date of birth: 25 March 2003 (age 23)
- Place of birth: Caransebeș, Romania
- Height: 1.76 m (5 ft 9 in)
- Positions: Full-back; midfielder

Team information
- Current team: Kayserispor
- Number: 22

Youth career
- 2010–2014: CSȘ Caransebeș
- 2013–2014: → CSM Reșița (loan)
- 2014–2016: LPS Banatul Timișoara
- 2016–2018: ASU Politehnica Timișoara

Senior career*
Years	Team	Apps	(Gls)
2018–2024	ASU Politehnica Timișoara	65	(2)
2023–2024	→ Petrolul Ploiești (loan)	11	(0)
2024–2026	Petrolul Ploiești	36	(1)
2026	→ Eyüpspor (loan)	15	(0)
2026–	Kayserispor	9	(0)

International career^{‡}
2021–2022	Romania U19	2	(0)
2022–2024	Romania U20	2	(0)
- * Club domestic league appearances and goals as of 25 October 2026 ‡ National team caps and goals as of 26 March 2024

Denis Răzvan Radu (born 25 March 2003) is a Romanian professional footballer who plays as a full-back or a midfielder for TFF 1. Lig club Kayserispor.

== Club career ==
Radu made his professional debut for Petrolul Ploiești on 22 October 2023, in a 3–1 away Liga I win over Universitatea Craiova.

== Career statistics ==
As of match played 25 October 2026

Appearances and goals by club, season and competition
Club	Season	League			National cup (Note: Includes Cupa României, Turkish Cup)		Europe		Other		Total	
Club	Season	Division	Apps	Goals	Apps	Goals	Apps	Goals	Apps	Goals	Apps	Goals
ASU Politehnica Timișoara	2018–19	Liga II	1	0	—		—		—		1	0
ASU Politehnica Timișoara	2019–20	Liga II	4	0	0	0	—		—		4	0
ASU Politehnica Timișoara	2020–21	Liga II	18	0	2	0	—		—		20	0
ASU Politehnica Timișoara	2021–22	Liga II	18	1	2	0	—		—		20	1
ASU Politehnica Timișoara	2022–23	Liga II	23	1	0	0	—		—		23	1
ASU Politehnica Timișoara	2023–24	Liga III	1	0	1	0	—		—		2	0
ASU Politehnica Timișoara	Total		65	2	5	0	—		—		70	2
Petrolul Ploiești (loan)	2023–24	Liga I	11	0	2	0	—		—		13	0
Petrolul Ploiești	2024–25	Liga I	31	0	3	0	—		—		34	0
Petrolul Ploiești	2025–26	Liga I	5	1	2	0	—		—		7	1
Petrolul Ploiești	Total		47	1	7	0	—		—		54	3
Eyüpspor (loan)	2025–26	Süper Lig	15	0	2	0	—		—		17	0
Kayserispor	2026–27	TFF 1. Lig	9	0	0	0	—		—		9	0
Career total			136	3	14	0	0	0	1	0	151	3
