= Cătălin Tolea =

Romanian footballer (born 2003)

Personal information
- Full name: Ioan Cătălin Tolea
- Date of birth: 11 May 2003 (age 23)
- Place of birth: Târgoviște, Romania
- Height: 1.78 m (5 ft 10 in)
- Positions: Full-back; defensive midfielder

Team information
- Current team: CSA Steaua București
- Number: 30

Youth career
- Kinder Târgoviște
- –2021: CSȘ Târgoviște
- 2021–2022: Petrolul Ploiești

Senior career*
Years	Team	Apps	(Gls)
2021–2026	Petrolul Ploiești	22	(1)
2023	→ Pucioasa (loan)		
2023–2024	→ Blejoi (loan)		
2026	→ Voluntari (loan)	8	(0)
2026–	CSA Steaua București	6	(0)
- * Club domestic league appearances and goals as of 30 October 2026

Ioan Cătălin Tolea (born 11 May 2003) is a Romanian professional footballer who plays as a full-back or a defensive midfielder for Liga II club CSA Steaua București.

== Honours ==
Petrolul Ploiești

- Liga II: 2021–22
