= Ionuț Cojocaru =

Romanian footballer (born 2003)

Personal information
- Full name: Ionuț Sebastian Cojocaru
- Date of birth: 26 July 2003 (age 23)
- Place of birth: Brăila, Romania
- Height: 1.83 m (6 ft 0 in)
- Position: Winger

Team information
- Current team: Sliema Wanderers (on loan from Farul Constanța)
- Number: 29

Youth career
- 2016–2022: Gheorghe Hagi Academy

Senior career*
Years	Team	Apps	(Gls)
2022–	Farul Constanța	49	(6)
2023	→ Petrolul Ploiești (loan)	0	(0)
2026–	→ Sliema Wanderers (loan)	4	(2)

International career^{‡}
2022–2024	Romania U20	8	(0)
2025	Romania U21	2	(0)
- * Club domestic league appearances and goals as of 20 September 2026 ‡ National team caps and goals as of 25 March 2025

Ionuț Sebastian Cojocaru (born 28 July 2003) is a Romanian professional footballer who plays as a winger for Maltese Premier League club Sliema Wanderers, on loan from Liga I club Farul Constanța.

== Club career ==
Cojocaru started his senior career with Farul Constanța, making his Liga I debut on 6 February 2023 in a 2–1 victory over Universitatea Craiova.

On 22 June 2023, Cojocaru was loaned out for one season to fellow league team Petrolul Ploiești. He returned to his parent club on 4 September, after failing to record his competitive debut for "the Yellow and Blues".

On 12 April 2024, Cojocaru scored his first senior goals in a 2–1 away league win over Universitatea Craiova. One week later, he netted another double in a 5–1 home thrashing of CFR Cluj, also in the Liga I.

== Career statistics ==
As of match played 20 September 2026

Appearances and goals by club, season and competition
Club	Season	League			Cupa României		Continental		Other		Total	
Club	Season	Division	Apps	Goals	Apps	Goals	Apps	Goals	Apps	Goals	Apps	Goals
Farul Constanța	2022–23	Liga I	2	0	2	0	—		—		4	0
Farul Constanța	2023–24	Liga I	9	4	2	0	—		—		11	4
Farul Constanța	2024–25	Liga I	14	1	2	2	—		—		16	3
Farul Constanța	2025–26	Liga I	21	1	0	0	—		2 (Note: Appearances in Liga I promotion/relegation play-offs)	0	23	1
Farul Constanța	2026–27	Liga I	3	0	1	0	—		—		4	0
Farul Constanța	Total		49	6	7	2	—		2	0	58	8
Petrolul Ploiești (loan)	2023–24	Liga I	0	0	—		—		—		0	0
Sliema Wanderers (loan)	2026–27	Maltese Premier League	4	2	0	0	—		—		4	2
Career total			53	8	7	2	—		2	0	62	10

== Honours ==
Farul Constanța

- Liga I: 2022–23
