= Nana Akosah-Bempah =

American soccer player (born 1997)

Personal information
- Full name: Nana Dwomoh Akosah-Bempah
- Date of birth: August 29, 1997 (age 29)
- Place of birth: Delaware City, Delaware, United States
- Height: 1.78 m (5 ft 10 in)
- Position: Striker

Team information
- Current team: Transinvest
- Number: 11

Youth career
- –2002: Black Aces

Senior career*
Years	Team	Apps	(Gls)
2016–2019	Cape Town City	22	(1)
2017	→ All Stars (loan)	10	(1)
2021	Orlando Pirates	0	(0)
2021	→ Cape Town Spurs (loan)	9	(0)
2021–2022	Motorlet Prague	10	(3)
2022–2023	Pardubice	9	(0)
2023–2024	Hapoel Acre	42	(6)
2024–2026	Petrolul Ploiești	9	(1)
2026–	Transinvest	8	(1)
- * Club domestic league appearances and goals as of 25 August, 2026

Nana Dwomoh Akosah-Bempah (born August 29, 1997) is an American professional soccer player who plays as a striker for TOPLYGA club Transinvest.

== Early life and education ==
Akosah-Bempah was born in 1997 in the United States. He moved to South Africa as a child. He is the son of Ghanaian accountant Kwaku Akosah-Bempah.

Akosah-Bempah attended the University of South Africa in South Africa. He studied philosophy, politics, and economics.

== Career ==
Akosah-Bempah started his career with South African side Cape Town City. He was described as shouldering "the onus in offence" while playing for the club. In 2021, he signed for Czech side Motorlet Prague. He was described as "excelled in the lineup" while playing for the club.

== Style of play ==
Akosah-Bempah mainly operates as a striker. He is known for his speed.

== Honors ==
Cape Town City

- Telkom Knockout: 2016
- MTN 8: 2018
