= David Ilie =

Romanian footballer

Personal information
- Date of birth: 17 August 2004 (age 22)
- Place of birth: Ploiești, Romania
- Height: 1.86 m (6 ft 1 in)
- Position: Forward

Team information
- Current team: Oxigen București (on loan from Petrolul Ploiești)

Youth career
- –2022: Petrolul Ploiești

Senior career*
Years	Team	Apps	(Gls)
2022–	Petrolul Ploiești	3	(0)
2022	→ Oțelul Galați (loan)	0	(0)
2022	→ Metaloglobus București (loan)	1	(0)
2023	→ Blejoi (loan)		
2023–2024	→ Cetatea Turnu Măgurele (loan)		
2025	→ SR Brașov (loan)		
2026	→ Hermannstadt (loan)	0	(0)
2026–	→ Oxigen București (loan)	0	(0)
- * Club domestic league appearances and goals as of 4 December 2025

David Ilie (born 17 August 2004) is a Romanian professional footballer who plays as a forward for Liga III club Oxigen București, on loan from Liga I club Petrolul Ploiești.

== Honours ==
Blejoi

- Liga III: 2022–23
