= Cătălin Vulturar =

Romanian footballer (born 2004)

Personal information
- Full name: Cătălin Alin Vulturar
- Date of birth: 9 March 2004 (age 22)
- Place of birth: Arad, Romania
- Height: 1.81 m (5 ft 11 in)
- Position: Midfielder

Team information
- Current team: Rapid București
- Number: 15

Youth career
- –2019: UTA Arad
- 2020–2024: Lecce

Senior career*
Years	Team	Apps	(Gls)
2018–2020	UTA Arad	3	(0)
2024–	Rapid București	41	(2)
2024	→ UTA Arad (loan)	9	(0)

International career^{‡}
2016	Romania U16	4	(0)
2021	Romania U18	2	(0)
2022–2023	Romania U19	6	(0)
2024–2025	Romania U20	5	(1)
2023–2026	Romania U21	18	(1)
- * Club domestic league appearances and goals as of 7 November 2026 ‡ National team caps and goals as of 25 September 2026

Cătălin Alin Vulturar (born 9 March 2004) is a Romanian professional footballer who plays as a midfielder for Liga I club Rapid București.

== Club career ==
Born in Arad, Romania, Vulturar started his career with UTA Arad, making his first team debut at the age of fourteen. After rejecting an offer from FCSB, and trialling with Barcelona and Liverpool, he signed for Italian side Lecce in 2020. In completing the transfer, he became the most expensive sale in UTA Arad history.

In October 2021, he was named by English newspaper The Guardian as one of the best players born in 2004 worldwide. He has since been named captain of Lecce's under-19 side. He won the Campionato Primavera with them in 2023.

On 1 February 2024, Lecce announced Vulturar's transfer to Rapid București. Lecce reserved 40% of the sell-on fee and an option to match a purchase offer. Three weeks later, in order to gain playing minutes and adapt to Romanian football, he was sent on loan to UTA Arad until the summer, due to a huge number of midfielders in the team squad.

== International career ==
Vulturar has represented Romania at under-18 and under-19 level.

== Career statistics ==
As of 7 November 2026

Appearances and goals by club, season and competition
Club	Season	League			Cupa României		Europe		Other		Total	
Club	Season	Division	Apps	Goals	Apps	Goals	Apps	Goals	Apps	Goals	Apps	Goals
UTA Arad	2018–19	Liga II	1	0	0	0	—		0	0	1	0
UTA Arad	2019–20	Liga II	2	0	1	0	—		—		3	0
UTA Arad	Total		3	0	1	0	—		0	0	4	0
Rapid București	2024–25	Liga I	7	0	2	0	—		—		9	0
Rapid București	2025–26	Liga I	23	2	2	0	—		—		25	2
Rapid București	2026–27	Liga I	11	0	0	0	—		—		11	0
Rapid București	Total		41	2	4	0	—		—		45	2
UTA Arad (loan)	2023–24	Liga I	9	0	—		—		—		9	0
Career total			53	2	5	0	—		0	0	58	2

== Honours ==
UTA Arad

- Liga II: 2019–20
