= Tidiane Keïta =

French footballer (born 1996)

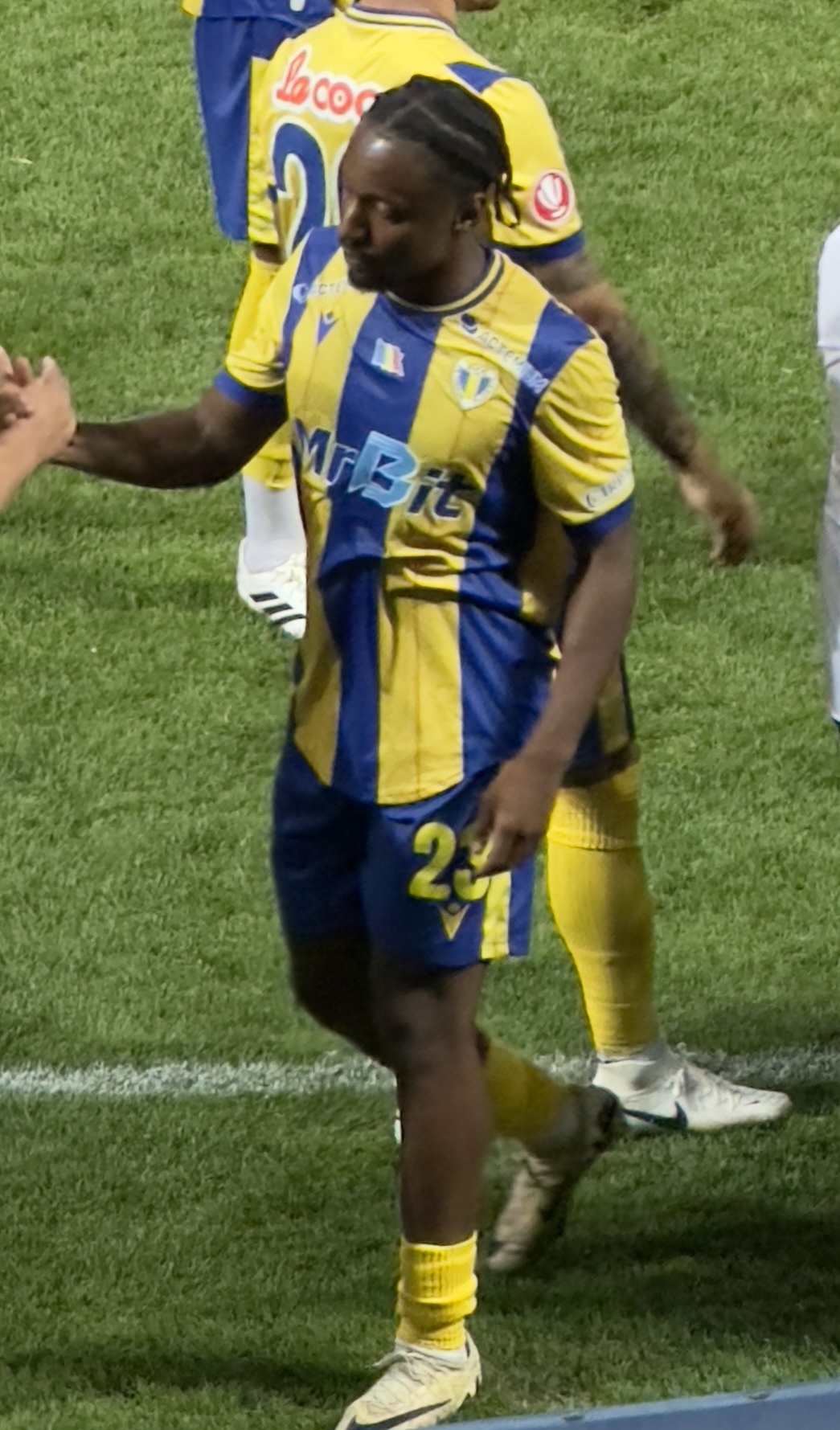
- Keïta with Petrolul Ploiești in 2025

Personal information
- Full name: Tidiane Keïta
- Date of birth: 18 September 1996 (age 30)
- Place of birth: Gonesse, France
- Height: 1.80 m (5 ft 11 in)
- Position: Midfielder

Team information
- Current team: Ordabasy
- Number: 44

Youth career
- –2014: Toulouse

Senior career*
Years	Team	Apps	(Gls)
2014	Toulouse B	1	(0)
2014–2016	Albi	43	(1)
2016–2019	Colomiers	48	(7)
2019–2022	Orléans	56	(0)
2020	Orléans B	4	(1)
2022–2024	Dunkerque	57	(1)
2024–2025	Petrolul Ploiești	40	(2)
2025–2026	CFR Cluj	28	(0)
2026–	Ordabasy	16	(1)
- * Club domestic league appearances and goals as of 14:10, 31 October 2026 (UTC)

Tidiane Keïta (born 18 September 1996) is a French professional footballer who plays as a midfielder for Kazakhstan Premier League club Ordabasy.

== Career ==
=== Early career and lower leagues ===
Keïta began his career in the youth academy of Toulouse, before transitioning to senior football in the French lower leagues. He first played for Albi from 2014 to 2016, followed by a three-year stint at Colomiers, where his performances drew attention from higher-tier clubs.

=== Orléans ===
On 14 April 2019, Keïta signed his first professional contract with Orléans, then competing in Ligue 2. He made his professional debut on 26 July 2019, starting in a goalless draw against Nancy in the opening match of the season.

=== Dunkerque ===
Keïta moved to Dunkerque on 26 June 2022. Over the next two years, he made 57 appearances in the Ligue 2 and the Championnat National combined, contributing with one goal.

=== Petrolul Ploiești ===
In June 2024, Keïta made his first move abroad by signing a three-year contract with Romanian club Petrolul Ploiești. He made 38 appearances in all competitions during his debut season, scoring two goals and providing two assists, as Petrolul secured a mid-table finish in the Liga I.

=== CFR Cluj ===
On 2 August 2025, Keïta transferred to fellow Liga I team CFR Cluj for a rumoured fee of €400,000. He made his debut five days later, coming on in the 63rd minute for Damjan Đoković in a 1–2 home loss to Braga in the UEFA Europa League second qualifying round.

== Style of play ==
Keïta is primarily deployed as a central or defensive midfielder, where his ball-winning ability and combative nature stand out.

== Personal life ==
Born in France, Keïta is of Guinean descent.

== Career statistics ==
As of match played 7 November 2026

Appearances and goals by club, season and competition
Club	Season	League			National cup (Note: Includes Coupe de France, Cupa României, Kazakhstan Cup)		Europe		Other		Total	
Club	Season	Division	Apps	Goals	Apps	Goals	Apps	Goals	Apps	Goals	Apps	Goals
Toulouse B	2013–14	Championnat de France Amateur 2	1	0	—		—		—		1	0
Albi	2014–15	Ligue d'Occitanie	?	?	?	?	—		—		?	?
Albi	2015–16	Ligue d'Occitanie	?	?	?	?	—		—		?	?
Albi	Total		43	1	—		—		—		43	1
Colomiers	2016–17	Championnat de France Amateur	6	0	—		—		—		6	0
Colomiers	2017–18	Championnat National 2	13	0	1	0	—		—		14	0
Colomiers	2018–19	Championnat National 2	29	7	0	0	—		—		29	7
Colomiers	Total		48	7	1	0	—		—		49	7
Orléans	2019–20	Ligue 2	14	0	2	0	—		2 (Note: Appearances in Coupe de la Ligue)	0	18	0
Orléans	2020–21	Championnat National	11	0	2	0	—		—		13	0
Orléans	2021–22	Championnat National	31	0	3	0	—		—		34	0
Orléans	Total		56	0	7	0	—		—		63	0
Orléans B	2019–20	Championnat National 3	2	1	—		—		—		2	1
Orléans B	2020–21	Championnat National 3	2	0	—		—		—		2	0
Orléans B	Total		4	1	—		—		—		4	1
Dunkerque	2022–23	Championnat National	31	1	5	0	—		—		36	1
Dunkerque	2023–24	Ligue 2	26	0	4	0	—		—		30	0
Dunkerque	Total		57	1	9	0	—		—		66	1
Petrolul Ploiești	2024–25	Liga I	36	2	2	0	—		—		38	2
Petrolul Ploiești	2025–26	Liga I	4	0	—		—		—		4	0
Petrolul Ploiești	Total		40	2	2	0	—		—		42	2
CFR Cluj	2025–26	Liga I	28	0	3	0	3 (Note: Two appearances in UEFA Europa League, one appearance in UEFA Conference League)	0	—		34	0
Ordabasy	2026	Kazakhstan Premier League	16	1	2	0	0	0	—		18	1
Career total			293	13	24	0	3	0	2	0	322	13

== Honours ==
Ordabasy

- Kazakhstan Premier League: 2026
- Kazakhstan Cup: 2026
