= Takayuki Seto =

Japanese footballer (born 1986)

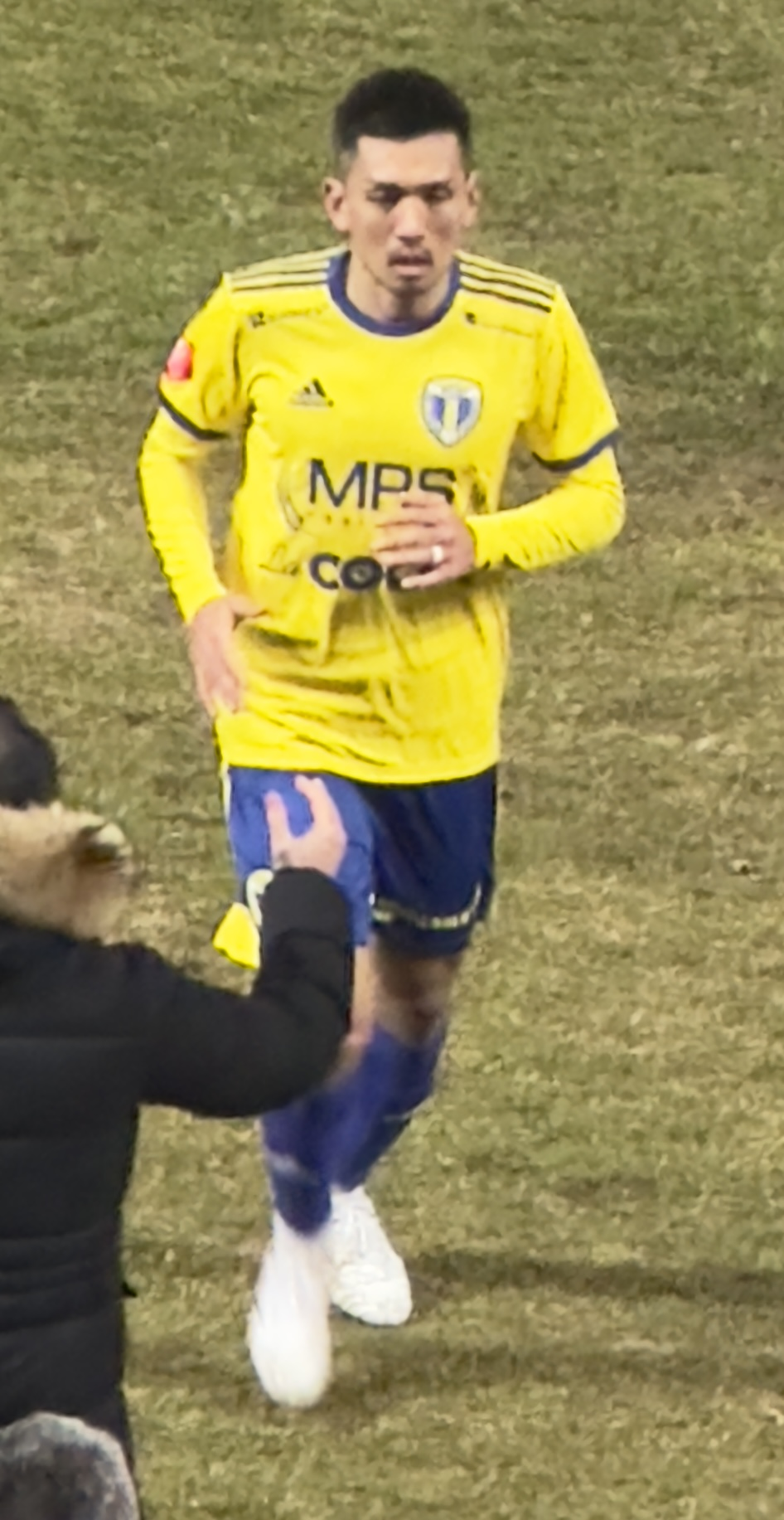
- Seto with Petrolul Ploiești in 2023

Personal information
- Full name: Takayuki Seto
- Date of birth: 5 February 1986 (age 40)
- Place of birth: Nagoya, Japan
- Height: 1.81 m (5 ft 11 in)
- Position: Defensive midfielder

Team information
- Current team: ARO Câmpulung
- Number: 5

Youth career
- 1997–2001: Nagoya
- 2001–2003: Atsuta High School
- 2004: Avaí
- 2005: Corinthians
- 2005: Portuguesa-RJ
- 2006: Aichi New Waves
- 2006–2007: OSFC
- 2007: T.T.Choppar

Senior career*
Years	Team	Apps	(Gls)
2007–2015	Astra Giurgiu	254	(30)
2015–2017	Osmanlıspor	7	(0)
2016–2017	→ Astra Giurgiu (loan)	43	(1)
2017–2018	Astra Giurgiu	26	(2)
2018	Ventforet Kofu	1	(0)
2019–2020	RFS	24	(1)
2020–2021	Astra Giurgiu	11	(1)
2021–2024	Petrolul Ploiești	98	(1)
2024–2026	Argeș Pitești	44	(1)
2026–	ARO Câmpulung	0	(0)
- * Club domestic league appearances and goals as of 22 May 2026

Takayuki Seto (Japanese: 瀬戸 貴幸, Seto Takayuki; born 5 February 1986) is a Japanese professional footballer who plays as a defensive midfielder for Liga III club ARO Câmpulung.

== Career ==
Born in Japan, Seto trained between 2004 and 2005 with Brazilian teams Avaí, Corinthians, and Portuguesa-RJ in order to improve his footballing skills. He also played indoor football in his country of birth.

Seto started out as a senior in 2007 with Romanian third division club Astra Ploiești; he spent most of his career at that side, which later relocated to Giurgiu. Seto totalled 26 goals from 274 games in the top flight and won four major honours with Astra, including the 2015–16 Liga I. He also had brief stints with clubs in Turkey, Japan, and Latvia, as well as with rivals Petrolul Ploiești, respectively. In July 2024, aged 38, he joined Argeș Pitești.

== Career statistics ==
As of match played 29 July 2026.

Appearances and goals by club, season and competition
Club	Season	League			National cup (Note: Includes Cupa României, Turkish Cup, Latvian Cup)		League cup (Note: Includes Cupa Ligii, J. League Cup)		Continental		Other		Total	
Club	Season	Division	Apps	Goals	Apps	Goals	Apps	Goals	Apps	Goals	Apps	Goals	Apps	Goals
Astra Giurgiu	2007–08	Liga III	33	7	0	0	—		—		—		33	7
Astra Giurgiu	2008–09	Liga II	27	1	3	1	—		—		—		30	2
Astra Giurgiu	2009–10	Liga I	34	3	3	0	—		—		—		37	3
Astra Giurgiu	2010–11	Liga I	33	3	1	0	—		—		—		34	3
Astra Giurgiu	2011–12	Liga I	33	1	2	0	—		—		—		35	1
Astra Giurgiu	2012–13	Liga I	33	7	5	1	—		—		—		38	8
Astra Giurgiu	2013–14	Liga I	24	2	5	0	—		7 (Note: Appearances in UEFA Europa League)	0	—		36	2
Astra Giurgiu	2014–15	Liga I	32	6	0	0	4	1	8	1	1 (Note: Appearance in Supercupa României)	0	45	8
Astra Giurgiu	2015–16	Liga I	5	0	0	0	0	0	4	0	—		9	0
Astra Giurgiu	Total		254	30	19	2	4	1	19	1	1	0	297	34
Osmanlıspor	2015–16	Süper Lig	7	0	2	0	—		—		—		9	0
Osmanlıspor	2016–17	Süper Lig	0	0	0	0	—		—		—		0	0
Osmanlıspor	Total		7	0	2	0	—		—		—		9	0
Astra Giurgiu (loan)	2015–16	Liga I	10	0	0	0	0	0	—		—		10	0
Astra Giurgiu (loan)	2016–17	Liga I	33	1	5	1	1	0	12 (Note: Two appearances in UEFA Champions League, ten appearances in UEFA Europa League)	1	0	0	51	2
Astra Giurgiu (loan)	Total		43	1	5	1	1	0	12	1	0	0	61	2
Astra Giurgiu	2017–18	Liga I	26	2	3	0	—		—		—		29	2
Ventforet Kofu	2018	J2 League	1	0	0	0	2	0	—		—		3	0
RFS	2019	Virslīga	24	1	2	0	—		2	0	—		28	1
Astra Giurgiu	2019–20	Liga I	7	1	—		—		—		—		7	1
Astra Giurgiu	2020–21	Liga I	4	0	0	0	—		—		—		4	0
Astra Giurgiu	Total		11	1	0	0	—		—		—		11	1
Petrolul Ploiești	2021–22	Liga II	27	1	1	0	—		—		—		28	1
Petrolul Ploiești	2022–23	Liga I	35	0	1	0	—		—		—		36	0
Petrolul Ploiești	2023–24	Liga I	35	0	2	0	–		—		—		37	0
Petrolul Ploiești	2024–25	Liga I	1	0	—		—		—		—		1	0
Petrolul Ploiești	Total		98	1	4	0	—		—		—		102	1
Argeș Pitești	2024–25	Liga II	27	1	3	0	—		—		—		30	1
Argeș Pitești	2025–26	Liga I	17	0	4	1	—		—		—		21	1
Argeș Pitești	Total		44	1	7	1	—		—		—		51	2
ARO Câmpulung	2026–27	Liga III	0	0	1	1	—		—		—		1	1
Career total			508	37	43	5	7	1	33	2	1	0	592	45

== Honours ==
Astra Giurgiu

- Liga I: 2015-16
- Cupa României: 2013–14
- Supercupa României: 2014, 2016
- Liga III: 2007–08

RFS

- Latvian Cup: 2019

Petrolul Ploiești

- Liga II: 2021–22

Argeș Pitești

- Liga II: 2024–25

Records

- Foreign player with the most appearances in Liga I: 361 (Note: Camora is the player born outside Romania with the most Liga I appearances, but in 2020 he obtained Romanian citizenship and earned his first caps for the nation.)

== See also ==
- List of foreign Liga I players
