= Florin Borța =

Romanian footballer (born 1999)

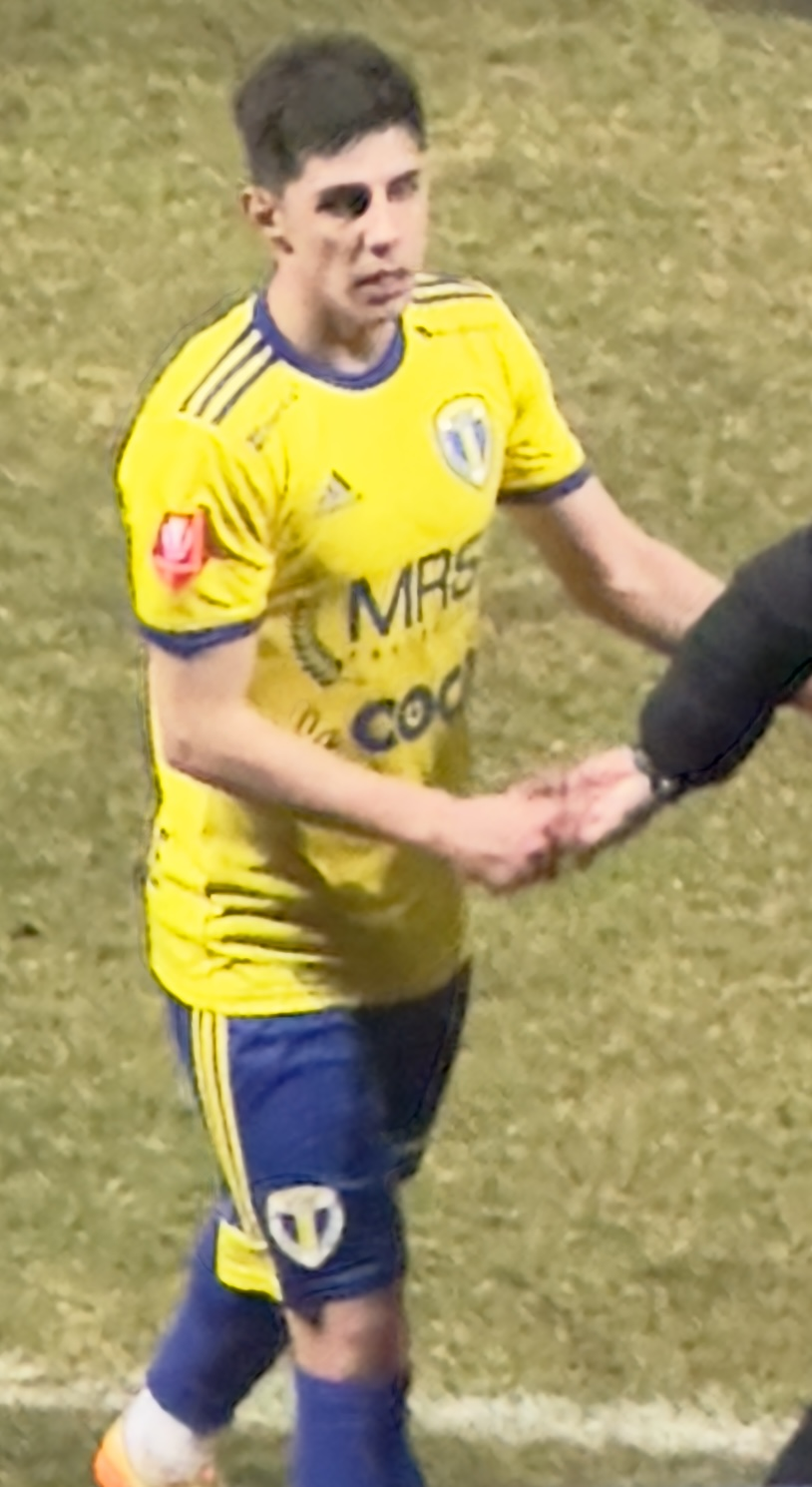
- Borța with Petrolul Ploiești in 2023

Personal information
- Full name: Florin Gheorghe Borța
- Date of birth: 21 June 1999 (age 27)
- Place of birth: Râmnicu Vâlcea, Romania
- Height: 1.75 m (5 ft 9 in)
- Position: Right-back

Team information
- Current team: Argeș Pitești
- Number: 23

Youth career
- Viitorul Știința Craiova
- –2018: Universitatea Craiova

Senior career*
Years	Team	Apps	(Gls)
2018–2024	Universitatea Craiova	8	(0)
2019	→ Petrolul Ploiești (loan)	15	(1)
2020–2022	→ Concordia Chiajna (loan)	48	(1)
2022–2023	→ Petrolul Ploiești (loan)	26	(0)
2024–	Argeș Pitești	76	(1)

International career
2018	Romania U21	1	(0)
- * Club domestic league appearances and goals as of 6 November 2026

Florin Gheorghe Borța (born 21 June 1999) is a Romanian professional footballer who plays as a right-back for Liga I club Argeș Pitești.

== Career statistics ==
=== Club ===
As of match played 6 November 2026

Club	Season	League			Cupa României		Europe		Other		Total	
Club	Season	Division	Apps	Goals	Apps	Goals	Apps	Goals	Apps	Goals	Apps	Goals
Universitatea Craiova	2018–19	Liga I	3	0	0	0	0	0	0	0	3	0
Universitatea Craiova	2019–20	Liga I	2	0	0	0	0	0	–		2	0
Universitatea Craiova	2023–24	Liga I	3	0	1	0	–		–		4	0
Universitatea Craiova	Total		8	0	1	0	0	0	0	0	9	0
Petrolul Ploiești (loan)	2018–19	Liga II	15	1	–		–		–		15	1
Concordia Chiajna (loan)	2019–20	Liga II	3	0	–		–		–		3	0
Concordia Chiajna (loan)	2020–21	Liga II	19	1	2	0	–		–		21	1
Concordia Chiajna (loan)	2021–22	Liga II	26	0	1	0	–		2 (Note: Appearances in Liga I promotion/relegation play-offs)	0	29	0
Concordia Chiajna (loan)	Total		48	1	3	0	–		2	0	53	1
Petrolul Ploiești (loan)	2022–23	Liga I	26	0	0	0	–		–		26	0
Argeș Pitești	2023–24	Liga II	8	0	–		–		–		8	0
Argeș Pitești	2024–25	Liga II	23	0	3	1	–		–		26	1
Argeș Pitești	2025–26	Liga I	31	1	5	0	–		–		36	1
Argeș Pitești	2026–27	Liga I	14	0	2	0	–		–		16	0
Argeș Pitești	Total		76	1	10	1	–		–		86	2
Career total			173	3	14	1	0	0	2	0	189	4

== Honours ==
Universitatea Craiova

- Supercupa României runner-up: 2018

Argeș Pitești

- Liga II: 2024–25
