= Mario Bratu =

Romanian footballer (born 2002)

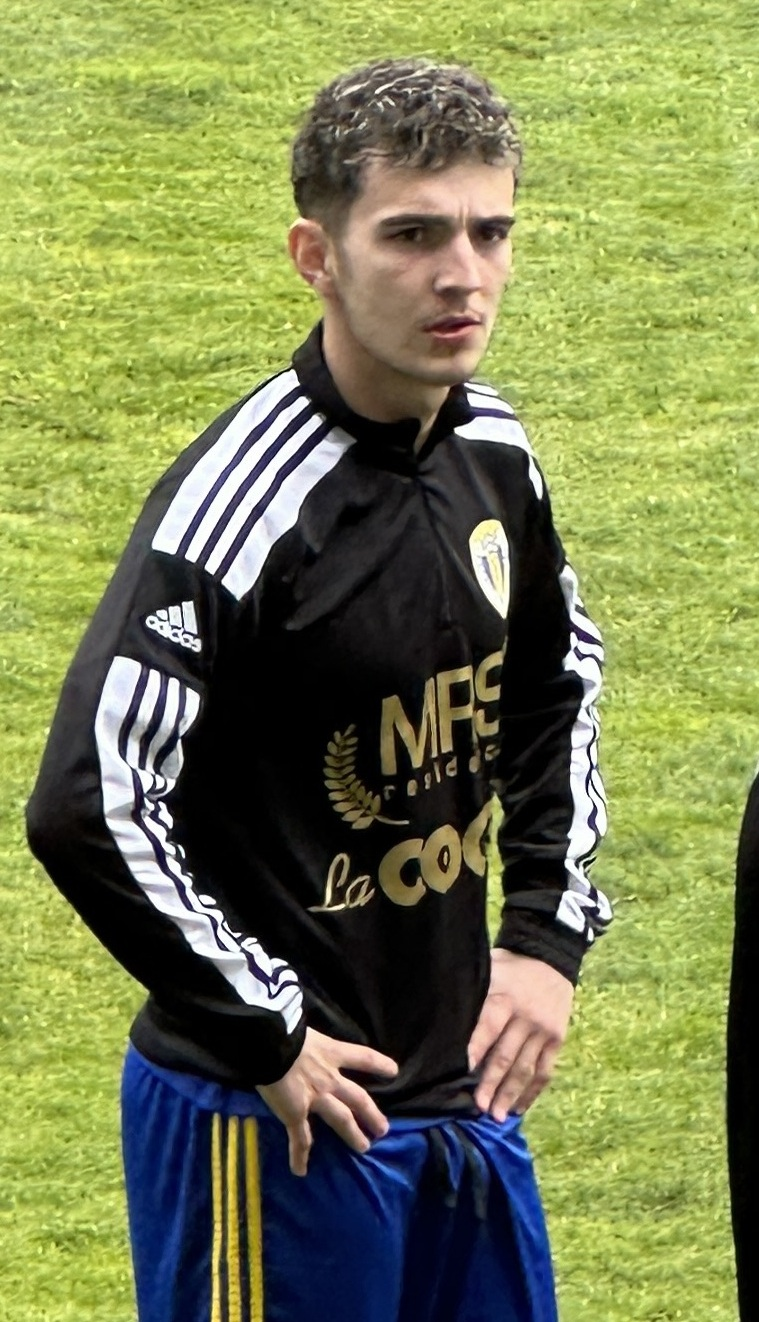
- Bratu with Petrolul Ploiești in 2023

Personal information
- Full name: Mario George Bratu
- Date of birth: 7 July 2002 (age 24)
- Place of birth: Ploiești, Romania
- Height: 1.76 m (5 ft 9 in)
- Positions: Attacking midfielder; winger

Team information
- Current team: Corvinul Hunedoara
- Number: 41

Youth career
- –2019: Petrolul Ploiești

Senior career*
Years	Team	Apps	(Gls)
2019–2025	Petrolul Ploiești	106	(11)
2025–	Corvinul Hunedoara	33	(6)

International career
2022–2023	Romania U20	8	(0)
- * Club domestic league appearances and goals as of 7 November 2026

Mario George Bratu (born 7 June 2002) is a Romanian professional footballer who plays as an attacking midfielder or a winger for Liga I club Corvinul Hunedoara.

== Club career ==
Bratu made his professional debut for his boyhood club Petrolul Ploiești on 18 July 2022, in a 1–0 Liga I loss to Voluntari. He scored both goals in the 2-0 win against Chiajna, the match which sealed the promotion to 1st League and his first goal in the 1st League competition came on 27 February 2023, in a 5–2 home loss to defending champions CFR Cluj.

== Honours ==
Petrolul Ploiești

- Liga II: 2021–22

Corvinul Hunedoara

- Liga II: 2025–26
