= Lucian Dumitriu =

Romanian professional footballer

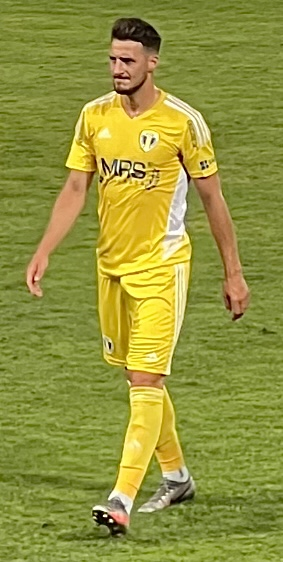
- Dumitriu with Petrolul Ploiești in 2022

Personal information
- Full name: Lucian Mihai Dumitriu
- Date of birth: 21 September 1992 (age 34)
- Place of birth: Bârlad, Romania
- Height: 1.80 m (5 ft 11 in)
- Position: Midfielder

Team information
- Current team: Corona Brașov
- Number: 4

Youth career
- –2009: LPS Bacău

Senior career*
Years	Team	Apps	(Gls)
2009–2012	Aerostar Bacău		
2012–2016	SC Bacău	77	(10)
2016–2017	Foresta Suceava	28	(7)
2017–2020	Hermannstadt	73	(7)
2020–2021	Academica Clinceni	23	(0)
2021–2022	Mioveni	32	(2)
2022–2026	Petrolul Ploiești	91	(2)
2026–	Corona Brașov	0	(0)
- * Club domestic league appearances and goals as of 22 November 2025

Lucian Mihai Dumitriu (born 21 September 1992) is a Romanian professional footballer who plays as a midfielder for Liga III club Corona Brașov.

== Honours ==
SC Bacău

- Liga III: 2012–13

Hermannstadt

- Cupa României runner-up: 2017–18
