= Zoran Mitrov =

Romanian footballer (born 2002)

Personal information
- Date of birth: 29 January 2002 (age 24)
- Place of birth: Timișoara, Romania
- Height: 1.79 m (5 ft 10 in)
- Position: Winger

Team information
- Current team: Botoșani
- Number: 11

Youth career
- –2019: LPS Banatul Timișoara
- 2019–2020: UTA Arad
- 2020–2021: Sassuolo

Senior career*
Years	Team	Apps	(Gls)
2021–2022	Ripensia Timișoara	23	(2)
2022–2023	FC Brașov	15	(4)
2023–2024	Petrolul Ploiești	3	(0)
2024–	Botoșani	95	(14)

International career^{‡}
2025	Romania U21	3	(0)
- * Club domestic league appearances and goals as of 1 November 2026 ‡ National team caps and goals as of 17 June 2025

Zoran Mitrov (Serbian Cyrillic: Зоран Митров; born 29 January 2002) is a Romanian professional footballer who plays as a winger for Liga I club Botoșani.

== Early life ==
Zoran Mitrov was born in Timișoara, started football at LPS Banatul Timișoara and also he played for youth academy of UTA Arad and Italian club Sassuolo.

== Club career ==
Mitrov made his professional debut for Petrolul Ploiești on 18 September 2023, in a 0–1 Liga I loss to CFR Cluj.

== Career statistics ==
As of 1 November 2026

Appearances and goals by club, season and competition
Club	Season	League			Cupa României		Europe		Other		Total	
Club	Season	Division	Apps	Goals	Apps	Goals	Apps	Goals	Apps	Goals	Apps	Goals
Ripensia Timișoara	2021–22	Liga II	21	2	1	0	—		—		22	1
Ripensia Timișoara	2022–23	Liga II	2	0	—		—		—		2	0
Ripensia Timișoara	Total		23	2	1	0	—		—		24	2
FC Brașov	2022–23	Liga II	15	4	0	0	—		—		15	4
Petrolul Ploiești	2023–24	Liga I	3	0	1	0	—		—		4	0
Botoșani	2023–24	Liga I	17	0	—		—		2 (Note: Appearances in Liga I promotion/relegation play-offs)	0	19	0
Botoșani	2024–25	Liga I	30	7	3	0	—		—		33	7
Botoșani	2025–26	Liga I	36	5	3	0	—		1 (Note: Appearance in Liga I European play-offs)	0	40	5
Botoșani	2026–27	Liga I	12	2	2	1	—		—		14	3
Botoșani	Total		95	14	8	1	—		3	0	106	15
Career total			136	20	10	1	—		2	0	148	21
