= Christian Irobiso =

Nigerian footballer (born 1993)

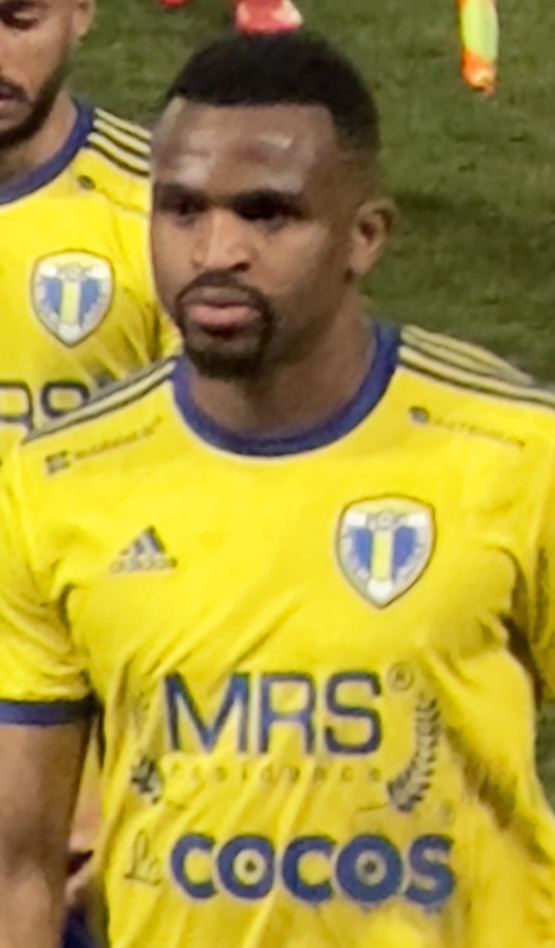
- Irobiso with Petrolul Ploiești in 2023

Personal information
- Full name: Okechukwu Christian Irobiso
- Date of birth: 28 May 1993 (age 33)
- Place of birth: Lagos, Nigeria
- Height: 1.90 m (6 ft 3 in)
- Position: Forward

Team information
- Current team: Sulaibikhat
- Number: 97

Youth career
- –2011: Paços de Ferreira

Senior career*
Years	Team	Apps	(Gls)
2012–2013	Paços de Ferreira	17	(1)
2012	→ União da Madeira (loan)	20	(2)
2014	Senica	11	(1)
2014	Vysočina Jihlava	3	(0)
2015–2016	Farense	61	(12)
2016–2017	Cova da Piedade	36	(6)
2017–2020	Farense	75	(17)
2020–2021	Varzim	32	(7)
2021–2022	Gaz Metan Mediaș	21	(2)
2022	Dinamo București	6	(3)
2022–2023	Petrolul Ploiești	36	(10)
2023–2025	Al-Ula	10	(6)
2024	→ Petrolul Ploiești (loan)	16	(3)
2024–2025	→ Petrolul Ploiești (loan)	21	(1)
2026	DPMM	7	(1)
2026–	Sulaibikhat	1	(1)
- * Club domestic league appearances and goals as of 12 August 2026

Okechukwu Christian Irobiso (born 28 May 1993) is a Nigerian professional footballer who plays as a forward for Kuwait Premier League club Sulaibikhat SC.

== Career ==
On 11 February 2014, he signed a contract with the Slovak side Senica.

On 30 December 2025, DPMM FC of Brunei announced the signing of Irobiso. He scored his first goal for the club in a 2–2 draw with Negeri Sembilan on 12 April 2026.

On 11 August 2026, Irobiso signed for Sulaibikhat SC, and scored on his debut.
