= 2024–25 FCSB season =

FCSB
2024–25 season
- Owner: Gigi Becali
- President: Valeriu Argăseală
- Manager: Elias Charalambous
- Stadium: Arena Națională
- Liga I: 1st
- Cupa României: Group stage
- Supercupa României: Winners
- UEFA Champions League: Third qualifying round
- UEFA Europa League: Round of 16
- Top goalscorer: League: Daniel Bîrligea (14); All: Daniel Bîrligea (17)
- Average home league attendance: 15,657
Home colours	Away colours	Third colours

The 2024–25 season was the 77th season in the history of FCSB, and the club's 77th consecutive season in Liga I. In addition to the domestic league, the team participated in the Cupa României, the UEFA Champions League qualifying rounds and the UEFA Europa League.

== Previous season positions ==
	Competition	Position
(European Union)	UEFA Europa Conference League	Third qualifying round
(Romania)	Liga I	1st
(Romania)	Cupa României	Group stage

== Season overview ==
=== Current squad ===
As of 23 May 2025

Note: Flags indicate national team as defined under FIFA eligibility rules; some limited exceptions apply. Players may hold more than one non-FIFA nationality.

No.	Pos.	Nation	Player
1	GK	ROU	Mihai Udrea
2	DF	ROU	Valentin Crețu
4	DF	ROU	Luca Ciobanu
5	DF	CMR	Joyskim Dawa
6	DF	ROU	Andrei Dăncuș
7	FW	ROU	Florin Tănase (3rd captain)
8	MF	ROU	Adrian Șut (vice-captain)
9	FW	ROU	Daniel Bîrligea
10	MF	ROU	Octavian Popescu
11	FW	ROU	David Miculescu
12	DF	BEN	David Kiki
13	GK	ROU	Matei Popa
15	FW	ROU	Marius Ștefănescu
16	MF	ROU	Mihai Lixandru
17	DF	ROU	Mihai Popescu
18	MF	FRA	Malcom Edjouma
19	FW	ROU	Luca Ilie
20	FW	ROU	Denis Colibășanu
21	DF	ROU	Vlad Chiricheș (4th captain)

No.	Pos.	Nation	Player
22	MF	ROU	Mihai Toma
23	DF	ROU	Ionuț Cercel
24	MF	BEL	William Baeten
25	FW	ROU	Alexandru Băluță
26	DF	ROU	Matei Manolache
27	MF	ROU	Darius Olaru (captain)
28	DF	ROU	Alexandru Pantea
29	MF	ROU	Alexandru Musi
30	DF	RSA	Siyabonga Ngezana
31	MF	ITA	Juri Cisotti
32	GK	ROU	Ștefan Târnovanu
33	DF	MNE	Risto Radunović
38	GK	CZE	Lukáš Zima
39	FW	FRA	Jordan Gele
42	MF	GHA	Baba Alhassan
70	FW	ROU	David Popa
77	FW	ROU	Andrei Gheorghiță (on loan from Politehnica Iași)
90	FW	ROU	Alexandru Stoian
98	FW	ROU	Robert Necșulescu

== Transfers ==
=== In ===
Pos.	Player	Transferred from	Fee	Date	Source
MF	(Romania) Ovidiu Perianu	(Romania) Gloria Buzău	Loan return	30 June 2024	
MF	(France) Malcom Edjouma	(Italy) Bari	Loan return	30 June 2024	
MF	(Romania) Alexandru Musi	(Romania) Petrolul Ploiești	Loan return	30 June 2024	
DF	(Benin) David Kiki	(Romania) Farul Constanța	Free	1 July 2024	
FW	(Romania) Daniel Popa	(Romania) Universitatea Cluj	€300,000	1 July 2024	
FW	(Romania) Marius Ștefănescu	(Romania) Sepsi OSK	€1,300,000	1 July 2024	
MF	(Belgium) William Baeten	(Romania) FC U Craiova	€300,000	13 July 2024	
FW	(Romania) Florin Tănase	(Saudi Arabia) Al-Okhdood	Free	7 August 2024	
DF	(Romania) Mihai Popescu	(Romania) Farul Constanța	€250,000	3 September 2024	
FW	(Romania) Daniel Bîrligea	(Romania) CFR Cluj	€2,000,000	3 September 2024	
GK	(Czech Republic) Lukáš Zima	(Romania) Petrolul Ploiești	€250,000	3 January 2025	
MF	(Italy) Juri Cisotti	(Romania) Oțelul Galați	€200,000	4 January 2025	
FW	(Romania) Alexandru Stoian	(Romania) Farul Constanța	€500,000	18 January 2025	
FW	(Romania) Andrei Gheorghiță	(Romania) Politehnica Iași	Loan fee: €100,000	6 February 2025	
FW	(Romania) David Popa	(Romania) Politehnica Iași	Loan return	10 February 2025	
DF	(Romania) Ionuț Cercel	(Romania) Farul Constanța	€500,000	10 February 2025	
FW	(France) Jordan Gele	(Romania) Unirea Slobozia	€300,000	10 February 2025	

=== Out ===
Pos.	Player	Transferred to	Fee	Date	Source
MF	(Romania) Ovidiu Popescu	(Romania) Universitatea Cluj	End of contract	1 July 2024	
MF	(Romania) Ovidiu Perianu	(Romania) Unirea Slobozia	Loan	1 July 2024	
FW	(Romania) Florinel Coman	(Qatar) Al-Gharafa	€5,250,000	7 July 2024	
MF	(Romania) Eduard Radaslavescu	(Romania) Farul Constanța	Free	9 July 2024	
MF	(Romania) Matei Tănasă	(Romania) Politehnica Iași	Undisclosed	10 July 2024	
GK	(Romania) Alexandru Maxim	(Romania) Voluntari	Loan	18 July 2024	
FW	(Romania) David Popa	(Romania) Politehnica Iași	Loan	6 August 2024	
DF	(Ghana) Nana Antwi	(Romania) Hermannstadt	Loan	1 September 2024	
DF	(Romania) Denis Haruț	(Romania) Sepsi OSK	Free	3 September 2024	
MF	(Romania) Andrei Pandele	(Romania) Voluntari	Undisclosed	4 September 2024	
GK	(Romania) Andrei Vlad	(Kazakhstan) Aktobe	Free	1 January 2025	
DF	(Romania) Ionuț Panțîru	(Romania) Voluntari	Free	23 January 2025	
FW	(Brazil) Luis Phelipe	(Moldova) Sheriff Tiraspol	Free	23 January 2025	
FW	(Romania) Daniel Popa	(Turkey) Gençlerbirliği	Free	3 February 2025	
DF	(Romania) Ricardo Pădurariu	(Romania) Gloria Bistrița	Loan	7 February 2025	
GK	(Romania) Alexandru Maxim	(Romania) Olimpia Satu Mare	Loan	10 February 2025	

== Friendlies ==
=== Pre-season ===
24 June 2024 Friendly	Apeldoorn (Netherlands)	0–8	(Romania) FCSB	Apeldoorn, Netherlands
19:00			Lixandru 6'; Băluță 20', 21'; Luis Phelipe 25'; Ștefănescu 53', 84'; Antwi 64'; Miculescu 89'	Stadium: WWNA

28 June 2024 Friendly	Almere City (Netherlands)	1–2	(Romania) FCSB	Almere, Netherlands
16:15	Hansen 21'		Miculescu 18'; Băluță 42' (pen.)	Stadium: Almere City FC Training Centre

=== Mid-season ===
7 September 2024 Friendly	FCSB (Romania)	3–0	(Romania) Voluntari	Bucharest
	Crețu 6'; Alhassan 36'; Ștefănescu 75'			Stadium: FCSB Training Centre

10 January 2025 Friendly	FCSB (Romania)	2–1	(Germany) Hamburger SV	Antalya, Turkey
14:00	Tănase 54' (pen.); O. Popescu 73' (pen.)		Sahiti 12'	Stadium: Gloria Sports Arena

12 January 2025 Friendly	FCSB (Romania)	1–2	(Ukraine) Dynamo Kyiv	Antalya, Turkey
16:00	Miculescu 74'		Buyalskyi 20', 27'	Stadium: Gloria Sports Arena

== Competitions ==
=== Overall record ===
Competition	First match	Last match	Starting round	Final position	Record							
Competition	First match	Last match	Starting round	Final position	Pld	W	D	L	GF	GA	GD	Win %
Liga I	13 July 2024	23 May 2025	Matchday 1	Winners	40	22	14	4	61	33	+28	55.00
Cupa României	30 October 2024	18 December 2024	Group stage	Group stage	3	2	0	1	6	3	+3	66.67
Supercupa României	4 July 2024		Final	Winners	1	1	0	0	3	0	+3	100.00
UEFA Champions League	9 July 2024	13 August 2024	First qualifying round	Third qualifying round	6	3	2	1	16	6	+10	50.00
UEFA Europa League	22 August 2024	13 March 2025	Play-off round	Round of 16	14	7	3	4	17	18	−1	50.00
Total					64	35	19	10	103	60	+43	54.69

Last updated: 23 May 2025
Source: Soccerway

=== SuperLiga ===
==== Regular season ====
Pos	Team	Pld	W	D	L	GF	GA	GD	Pts	Advances
1	FCSB	30	15	11	4	43	24	+19	56	Qualification for play-off round
2	CFR Cluj	30	14	12	4	56	32	+24	54	Qualification for play-off round
3	Universitatea Craiova	30	14	10	6	45	28	+17	52 (Note: Ranked on head-to-head points: Universitatea Craiova (4); Universitatea Cluj (1).)	Qualification for play-off round
4	Universitatea Cluj	30	14	10	6	43	27	+16	52	Qualification for play-off round
5	Dinamo București	30	13	12	5	41	26	+15	51	Qualification for play-off round

Source: LPF (in Romanian)
Rules for classification: 1) Points; 2) Head-to-head points; 3) Head-to-head goal difference; 4) Head-to-head goals scored; 5) Goal difference; 6) Goals scored; 7) Play-off.

==== Results summary ====
Overall								Home						Away					
Pld	W	D	L	GF	GA	GD	Pts	W	D	L	GF	GA	GD	W	D	L	GF	GA	GD
30	15	11	4	43	24	+19	56	8	5	2	23	13	+10	7	6	2	20	11	+9

==== Results by round ====
Round	1	2	3	4	5	6	7	8	9	10	11	12	13	14	15	16	17	18	19	20	21	22	23	24	25	26	27	28	29	30
Ground	H	A	H	A	H	H	A	H	A	H	A	H	A	H	A	A	H	A	H	A	A	H	A	H	A	H	A	H	A	H
Result	D	D	L	L	W	L	L	W	D	D	W	W	W	D	D	W	W	W	W	D	W	D	W	D	D	W	W	W	D	W
Position	7	10	13	15	9	13	15	10	11	13	9	7	5	6	6	6	5	3	2	3	2	2	2	2	4	2	1	1	1	1

A = Away; H = Home; W = Win; D = Draw; L = Loss

==== Results ====
The match schedule was released on 1 July 2024.

13 July 2024 1	FCSB	1–1	Universitatea Cluj	Bucharest
22:00 UTC+3	Musi 51'; Edjouma (yellow card) 55'; Crețu (yellow card) 69'	Report	Nistor 57' (pen.); Blănuță (yellow card) 74'; Masoero (yellow card) 74'; Oancea (yellow card) 90+3'	Stadium: Steaua; Attendance: 10,224; Referee: Adrian Cojocaru

19 July 2024 2	Unirea Slobozia	2–2	FCSB	Clinceni
21:30 UTC+3	Ilie 36'; Purece (yellow card) 49'; Rusu (yellow card) 64'; Dorobanțu 90'; López (yellow card) 90'	Report	Lixandru 33'; Dawa (yellow card) 48'; Olaru 55' (pen.); Musi (yellow card) 64'	Stadium: Clinceni; Attendance: 2,200; Referee: Vlad Băban

26 July 2024 3	FCSB	0–2	Oțelul Galați	Bucharest
	Antwi (yellow card) 50'; Alhassan (yellow card) 65'	Report	Cisotti 44'; Živulić 59'	Stadium: Steaua; Attendance: 4,754; Referee: Andrei Moroiță

9 August 2024 5	FCSB	3–2	Farul Constanța	Bucharest
	Ștefănescu 42'; Șut (yellow card) 68'; Olaru 86', 90+2' (pen.)	Report	Vînă 5', (yellow card) 86'; Grigoryan 43'; Grameni (yellow card) 62'; Queirós (yellow card) 70'	Stadium: Steaua; Attendance: 6,743; Referee: István Kovács

17 August 2024 6	FCSB	0–1	Politehnica Iași	Bucharest
		Report	Bordeianu 27'	Stadium: Steaua; Attendance: 4,525

25 August 2024 7	Hermannstadt	2–0	FCSB	Sibiu
	Murgia 56'; Deaconu 90+6'	Report		Stadium: Municipal Sibiu; Attendance: 8,278

1 September 2024 8	FCSB	2–0	UTA Arad	Bucharest
	Ngezana 16'; Băluță 87'	Report		Stadium: Arcul de Triumf; Attendance: 4,538

15 September 2024 9	CFR Cluj	2–2	FCSB	Cluj-Napoca
	Munteanu 36', 49'	Report	Băluță 59'; Dawa 87'	Stadium: Dr. Constantin Rădulescu; Attendance: 11,252; Referee: Marian Barbu

21 September 2024 10	FCSB	1–1	Petrolul Ploiești	Bucharest
21:30 UTC+3	Băluță 3'	Report	Tudorie 90+4'	Stadium: Steaua; Attendance: 8,512; Referee: Rareș Vidican

29 September 2024 11	Sepsi Sfântu Gheorghe	0–1	FCSB	Sfântu Gheorghe
21:30 UTC+3		Report	Tănase 15'	Stadium: Sepsi Arena; Attendance: 4,000; Referee: Andrei Moroiță

6 October 2024 12	FCSB	3–2	Gloria Buzău	Bucharest
21:00 UTC+3	O. Popescu 39', 67'; Bîrligea 74'	Report	Jipa 5'; Cestor 87'	Stadium: Arena Națională; Attendance: 7,502; Referee: Sebastian Colțescu

20 October 2024 13	Dinamo București	0–2	FCSB	Bucharest
21:00 UTC+3		Report	Bîrligea 26'; Musi 90+3'	Stadium: Arena Națională; Attendance: 45,469; Referee: Marian Barbu

26 October 2024 14	FCSB	0–0	Rapid București	Bucharest
21:00 UTC+2		Report		Stadium: Arena Națională; Attendance: 40,287; Referee: István Kovács

3 November 2024 15	Universitatea Craiova	1–1	FCSB	Craiova
21:00 UTC+2	Cicâldău 62' (pen.)	Report	Miculescu 17'	Stadium: Ion Oblemenco; Attendance: 15,702; Referee: Florin Andrei

10 November 2024 16	Universitatea Cluj	1–2	FCSB	Cluj-Napoca
21:00 UTC+2	Blănuță 85'	Report	Bîrligea 30', 51'	Stadium: Cluj Arena; Attendance: 23,123; Referee: Marcel Bîrsan

21 November 2024 4	Botoșani	1–0	FCSB	Botoșani
20:00 UTC+2	Mitrov 90+8'	Report		Stadium: Municipal; Attendance: 5,866; Referee: Sebastian Colțescu

24 November 2024 17	FCSB	3–0	Unirea Slobozia	Bucharest
18:15 UTC+2	Olaru 29'; Bîrligea 45+2'; Miculescu 71'	Report		Stadium: Arena Națională; Attendance: 6,528; Referee: George Roman

2 December 2024 18	Oțelul Galați	1–4	FCSB	Galați
20:30 UTC+2	Pop 54' (pen.)	Report	Bîrligea 9', 48'; Musi 40'; Olaru 81'	Stadium: Oțelul; Attendance: 6,532; Referee: Horațiu Feșnic

8 December 2024 19	FCSB	2–1	Botoșani	Bucharest
20:30 UTC+2	Bîrligea 12'; Miculescu 57'	Report	Díez 83'	Stadium: Arena Națională; Attendance: 6,073; Referee: Adrian Cojocaru

15 December 2024 20	Farul Constanța	1–1	FCSB	Ovidiu
20:45 UTC+2	Dican 78'	Report	Olaru 18'	Stadium: Viitorul; Attendance: 3,686; Referee: George Găman

23 December 2024 21	Politehnica Iași	0–2	FCSB	Iași
20:00 UTC+2		Report	Olaru 44', 76'	Stadium: Emil Alexandrescu; Attendance: 9,112; Referee: Rareș Vidican

17 January 2025 22	FCSB	1–1	Hermannstadt	Bucharest
20:00 UTC+2	Crețu 86'	Report	Chițu 13'	Stadium: Arena Națională; Attendance: 5,404; Referee: Andrei Moroiță

26 January 2025 23	UTA Arad	0–1	FCSB	Arad
20:00 UTC+2		Report	Tănase 63' (pen.)	Stadium: Francisc von Neuman; Attendance: 10,374; Referee: Viorel Flueran

2 February 2025 24	FCSB	1–1	CFR Cluj	Bucharest
20:00 UTC+2	Miculescu 57'	Report	Munteanu 53'	Stadium: Arena Națională; Attendance: 11,253; Referee: Sebastian Colțescu

5 February 2025 25	Petrolul Ploiești	0–0	FCSB	Ploiești
20:30 UTC+2		Report		Stadium: Ilie Oană; Attendance: 8,544; Referee: Marian Barbu

9 February 2025 26	FCSB	3–0	Sepsi Sfântu Gheorghe	Bucharest
20:00 UTC+2	Bîrligea 8', 15'; Radunović 27'	Report		Stadium: Arena Națională; Attendance: 5,157; Referee: Andrei Chivulete

16 February 2025 27	Gloria Buzău	0–2	FCSB	Buzău
20:45 UTC+2		Report	Tănase 67' (pen.); Turda 73' (o.g.)	Stadium: Municipal; Attendance: 4,117; Referee: Sorin Vădana

23 February 2025 28	FCSB	2–1	Dinamo București	Bucharest
20:00 UTC+2	Alhassan 20'; Gele 57'	Report	Perica 18'	Stadium: Arena Națională; Attendance: 30,157; Referee: István Kovács

2 March 2025 29	Rapid București	0–0	FCSB	Bucharest
20:00 UTC+2		Report		Stadium: Arena Națională; Attendance: 30,823; Referee: Radu Petrescu

9 March 2025 30	FCSB	1–0	Universitatea Craiova	Bucharest
20:00 UTC+2	Șut 29'	Report		Stadium: Arena Națională; Attendance: 15,732; Referee: Marian Barbu

==== Championship round ====
===== Table =====
Pos	Team	Pld	W	D	L	GF	GA	GD	Pts	Qualification
1	FCSB (C)	10	7	3	0	18	9	+9	52	Qualification for Champions League first qualifying round
2	CFR Cluj	10	4	4	2	17	11	+6	43	Qualification for Europa League first qualifying round (Note: The winner of the 2024–25 Cupa României (CFR Cluj) qualifies for the Europa League first qualifying round.)
3	Universitatea Craiova	10	4	2	4	13	11	+2	40	Qualification for Conference League second qualifying round
4	Universitatea Cluj	10	4	1	5	12	15	−3	39	Qualification for Conference League second qualifying round

Source: Soccerway, FRF (in Romanian), LPF (in Romanian)
Rules for classification: 1) Points; 2) Points without rounding; 3) Points in the regular season; 4) Head-to-head points; 5) Head-to-head goal difference; 6) Head-to-head goals scored; 7) Goal difference; 8) Goals scored; 9) Play-off (only if needed to decide champion or teams for UEFA competitions). (Note: only criteria 7 and 8 are applied to establish the classification during the competition.) Source:
(C) Champions

==== Championship round results summary ====
Overall								Home						Away					
Pld	W	D	L	GF	GA	GD	Pts	W	D	L	GF	GA	GD	W	D	L	GF	GA	GD
10	7	3	0	18	9	+9	24	4	1	0	11	6	+5	3	2	0	7	3	+4

Last updated: 23 May 2025.

==== Championship round position by round ====
Round	1	2	3	4	5	6	7	8	9	10
Ground	H	A	H	A	H	A	H	A	H	A
Result	D	W	W	D	W	W	W	W	W	D
Position	3	2	1	1	1	1	1	1	1	1

Updated to match(es) played on 23 May 2025. Source:
A = Away; H = Home; W = Win; D = Draw; L = Loss

==== Matches ====
16 March 2025 1	FCSB	3–3	Rapid București	Bucharest
21:00 UTC+2	Bîrligea 29'; Cisotti 55'; Tănase 90+3'	Report	Ciobotariu 40', 83'; Dobre 70'	Stadium: Arena Națională; Attendance: 26,385; Referee: Horațiu Feșnic

30 March 2025 2	Dinamo București	1–2	FCSB	Bucharest
20:30 UTC+3	Perica 24'	Report	Miculescu 44'; Alhassan 85'	Stadium: Arena Națională; Attendance: 31,476; Referee: Florin Andrei

5 April 2025 3	FCSB	1–0	Universitatea Cluj	Bucharest
21:15 UTC+3	Miculescu 59' (pen.)	Report		Stadium: Arena Națională; Attendance: 15,147; Referee: Szabolcs Kovacs

13 April 2025 4	Universitatea Craiova	0–0	FCSB	Craiova
21:00 UTC+3		Report		Stadium: Ion Oblemenco; Attendance: 28,012; Referee: Horațiu Feșnic

20 April 2025 5	FCSB	3–2	CFR Cluj	Bucharest
20:00 UTC+3	Cisotti 41', 63'; Chiricheș 56'	Report	Munteanu 67', 90+7'	Stadium: Arena Națională; Attendance: 14,158; Referee: István Kovács

27 April 2025 6	Rapid București	1–2	FCSB	Bucharest
21:00 UTC+3	Christensen 48'	Report	Cisotti 6'; Bîrligea 42'	Stadium: Rapid-Giulești; Attendance: 12,419; Referee: Radu Petrescu

5 May 2025 7	FCSB	3–1	Dinamo București	Bucharest
20:30 UTC+3	Bîrligea 23'; O. Popescu 26', 36'	Report	Selmani 56' (pen.)	Stadium: Arena Națională; Attendance: 37,073; Referee: Rareș Vidican

11 May 2025 8	Universitatea Cluj	0–2	FCSB	Cluj-Napoca
20:30 UTC+3		Report	Ștefănescu 72', 77'	Stadium: Cluj Arena; Attendance: 25,722; Referee: Marian Barbu

17 May 2025 9	FCSB	1–0	Universitatea Craiova	Bucharest
20:00 UTC+3	Bîrligea 19'	Report		Stadium: Arena Națională; Attendance: 53,135; Referee: Rareș Vidican

23 May 2025 10	CFR Cluj	1–1	FCSB	Cluj-Napoca
20:30 UTC+3	Munteanu 49'	Report	Stoian 1'	Stadium: Dr. Constantin Rădulescu; Attendance: 7,223; Referee: Andrei Moroiță

=== Cupa României ===
==== Group stage ====
Pos	Team	Pld	W	D	L	GF	GA	GD	Pts	Qualification	MET	UCV	FCS	PET	DIN	AGR
1	Metalul Buzău	3	2	1	0	4	0	+4	7	Advance to knockout phase	—	1–0	—	—	0–0	—
2	Universitatea Craiova	3	2	0	1	4	1	+3	6	Advance to knockout phase	—	—	—	—	—	—
3	FCSB	3	2	0	1	6	3	+3	6		—	0–2	—	—	—	—
4	Petrolul Ploiești	3	1	1	1	3	2	+1	4		—	0–2	—	—	—	—
5	Dinamo București	3	0	2	1	0	4	−4	2		—	—	0–4	0–0	—	—
6	Agricola Borcea	3	0	0	3	1	8	−7	0		0–3	—	1–2	0–3	—	—

Source: FRF
Legend: Blue = home team win; Yellow = draw; Red = away team win.

==== Results ====
30 October 2024 1	Dinamo București	0–4	FCSB	Bucharest
21:00 UTC+2		Report	Băluță 56'; Phelipe 70'; Ștefănescu 81', 88'	Stadium: Arena Națională; Attendance: 18,476; Referee: Radu Petrescu

5 December 2024 2	Agricola Borcea	1–2	FCSB	Borcea
20:30 UTC+2	Burlacu 48'	Report	Ștefănescu 12'; Panțîru 41'	Stadium: Comunal; Attendance: 2,700; Referee: Valentin Naidin

18 December 2024 3	FCSB	0–2	Universitatea Craiova	Bucharest
20:00 UTC+2		Report	Mora 45+1'; Mitriță 85'	Stadium: Arena Națională; Attendance: 5,487; Referee: Horațiu Feșnic

=== Supercupa României ===
4 July 2024 Final	FCSB	3–0	Corvinul Hunedoara	Bucharest
20:00 UTC+3	Miculescu 21'; Ștefănescu 52'; Dawa (yellow card) 61'; Phelipe 80'	Report	Manolache (yellow card) 46'; Lică (yellow card) 78'; Pîrvulescu (yellow card) 84'	Stadium: Steaua Stadium; Attendance: 15,915; Referee: Florin Andrei; Assistant referees: Andrei Constantinescu, Stelian Slabu; Fourth official: Ionuţ Coza
Note: The match was scheduled to be played on 6 July, but its date was moved forward to avoid conflicting with the Euro 2024 qualifiers.

=== UEFA Champions League ===
==== First qualifying round ====
9 July 2024 First leg	Virtus (San Marino)	1–7	(Romania) FCSB	Serravalle, San Marino
21:00 UTC+2	Golinucci (yellow card) 17'; Pupeschi (yellow card) 81'; Battistini 86'	Report	Olaru 6' (pen.), 11', 37'; Popa 22', 27'; Miculescu 70', 73'; Kiki (yellow card) 79'	Stadium: San Marino Stadium; Attendance: 1,863; Referee: Antoni Bandić (Bosnia and Herzegovina); Assistant referees: Amer Macić (Bosnia and Herzegovina), Damir Lazić (Bosnia and Herzegovina); Fourth official: Dragan Petrovic (Bosnia and Herzegovina)

16 July 2024 Second leg	FCSB (Romania)	4–0 (11–1 agg.)	(San Marino) Virtus	Bucharest
20:30 UTC+3	Băluță 20'; Edjouma 28', 36'; Miculescu 72'	Report	Buonocunto (yellow card) 78'	Stadium: Steaua; Attendance: 7,262; Referee: Stefan Ebner (Austria)

==== Second qualifying round ====
23 July 2024 First leg	FCSB (Romania)	1–1	(Israel) Maccabi Tel Aviv	Bucharest
19:30 (20:30 EEST)	Lixandru (yellow card) 31'; Dawa (yellow card) 70', (goal) 76'; Musi (yellow card) 90+4'	Report	Asante (yellow card) 22'; Addo (yellow card) 26'; Nachmias (yellow card) 29'; Biton 71'; Mishpati (yellow card) 90+3'	Stadium: Steaua Stadium; Attendance: 26,235; Referee: Gergő Bogár (Hungary)

31 July 2024 Second leg	Maccabi Tel Aviv (Israel)	0–1 (1–2 agg.)	(Romania) FCSB	Budapest, Hungary (Note: Due to the Gaza war, Israeli teams are required to play their home matches at neutral venues until further notice.)
20:00	Kanichowsky (yellow card) 50'; Asante (yellow card) 90+3'	Report	Crețu (yellow card) 38'; Băluță (yellow card) 43'; Luis Phelipe (yellow card) 50'; Dawa (yellow card) 82'; Baeten 90'; Ngezana (yellow card) 90+3'	Stadium: Bozsik Aréna; Attendance: 643; Referee: Jérémie Pignard (France)

==== Third qualifying round ====
6 August 2024 First leg	Sparta Prague (Czech Republic)	1–1	(Romania) FCSB	Prague, Czech Republic
20:00	Vitík (yellow card) 65'; Olatunji 78'; Krasniqi (yellow card) 84'	Report	Crețu (yellow card) 41'; Târnovanu (yellow card) 43'; Popa (yellow card) 43'; Dawa (yellow card) 55', (goal) 61'; Luis Phelipe (yellow card) 90+4'; Edjouma (yellow card) 90+8'; Radunović (yellow card) 90+9'	Stadium: Stadion Letná; Attendance: 17,229; Referee: Rohit Saggi (Norway)

13 August 2024 Second leg	FCSB (Romania)	2–3 (3–4 agg.)	(Czech Republic) Sparta Prague	Bucharest
20:30 (21:30 EEST)	Băluță (yellow card) 29'; Olaru (yellow card) 29', (goal) 60'; Lixandru (yellow card) 48'; Edjouma 85'; Târnovanu (yellow card) 90+4'; Crețu (yellow card) 90+6'	Report	Birmančević 13', 28' (pen.), (yellow card) 60'; Preciado (yellow card) 34'; Haraslín 37'; Sørensen (yellow card) 53'; Kuchta (yellow card) 79'	Stadium: Steaua Stadium; Attendance: 28,875; Referee: Morten Krogh (Denmark)

=== UEFA Europa League ===
==== Qualifying phase ====
Win Draw Loss Fixtures

===== Play-off round =====
22 August 2024 First leg	LASK (Austria)	1–1	(Romania) FCSB	Linz, Austria
19:00 CEST	Taoui 34', (yellow card) 38'; Bogarde (yellow card) 35'	Report	Miculescu 45+2', (yellow card) 89'; Dawa (yellow card) 60'; Olaru (yellow card) 68'; Tănase (yellow card) 68'	Stadium: Raiffeisen Arena; Attendance: 10,650; Referee: Allard Lindhout (Netherlands)

29 August 2024 Second leg	FCSB (Romania)	1–0 (2–1 agg.)	(Austria) LASK	Bucharest
21:30 EEST	Ngezana (yellow card) 31'; Popa (yellow card) 88'; Olaru 90+3'; Tănase (yellow card) 90+4'	Report	Berisha (yellow card) 41'; Usor (yellow card) 46'; Ljubičić (yellow card) 47'; Pintor (yellow card) 87'	Stadium: Steaua Stadium; Attendance: 21,523; Referee: Felix Zwayer (Germany)

==== League phase ====
Pos	Team	Pld	W	D	L	GF	GA	GD	Pts	Qualification
9	(Norwegian Football Federation) Bodø/Glimt	8	4	2	2	14	11	+3	14	Advance to knockout phase play-offs (seeded)
10	(Royal Belgian Football Association) Anderlecht	8	4	2	2	14	12	+2	14	Advance to knockout phase play-offs (seeded)
11	(Romanian Football Federation) FCSB	8	4	2	2	10	9	+1	14	Advance to knockout phase play-offs (seeded)
12	(Royal Dutch Football Association) Ajax	8	4	1	3	16	8	+8	13	Advance to knockout phase play-offs (seeded)
13	(Royal Spanish Football Federation) Real Sociedad	8	4	1	3	13	9	+4	13	Advance to knockout phase play-offs (seeded)

Source: UEFA
Rules for classification: League phase tiebreakers

Round	1	2	3	4	5	6	7	8
Ground	H	A	A	H	H	A	A	H
Result	W	W	L	W	D	D	W	L
Position	2	4	13	8	10	10	8	11

Source: UEFA
A = Away; H = Home; W = Win; D = Draw; L = Loss

==== Results ====
The match schedule was released on 31 August 2024, the day after the draw.

26 September 2024 1	FCSB (Romania)	4–1	(Latvia) RFS	Bucharest
21:00 (22:00 UTC+3)	Bîrligea 8'; Ștefănescu 32'; Olaru 58', 69'	Report	Lipušček 23'	Stadium: Arena Națională; Attendance: 34,257; Referee: Ricardo de Burgos Bengoetxea (Spain)

3 October 2024 2	PAOK (Greece)	0–1	(Romania) FCSB	Thessaloniki, Greece
21:00 (22:00 UTC+3)		Report	Bîrligea 45+8'	Stadium: Toumba Stadium; Attendance: 14,340; Referee: Sascha Stegemann (Germany)

24 October 2024 3	Rangers (Scotland)	4–0	(Romania) FCSB	Glasgow, Scotland
21:00 (22:00 UTC+3)	Lawrence 10'; Černý 31', 55'; Igamane 71'	Report		Stadium: Ibrox Stadium; Attendance: 41,191; Referee: Marco Di Bello (Italy)

7 November 2024 4	FCSB (Romania)	2–0	(Denmark) Midtjylland	Bucharest
18:45 (19:45 UTC+2)	Tănase 16'; Bîrligea 46'	Report		Stadium: Arena Națională; Attendance: 37,152; Referee: Duje Strukan (Croatia)

28 November 2024 5	FCSB (Romania)	0–0	(Greece) Olympiacos	Bucharest
21:00 (22:00 UTC+2)		Report		Stadium: Arena Națională; Attendance: 43,572; Referee: Sebastian Gishamer (Austria)

12 December 2024 6	TSG Hoffenheim (Germany)	0–0	(Romania) FCSB	Sinsheim, Germany
18:45 (19:45 UTC+2)		Report		Stadium: Rhein-Neckar-Arena; Attendance: 23,223; Referee: Juxhin Xhaja (Albania)

23 January 2025 7	Qarabağ (Azerbaijan)	2–3	(Romania) FCSB	Baku, Azerbaijan
18:45 (19:45 UTC+2)	L. Andrade 1'; Dawa 41' (o.g.)	Report	Șut 7', 73'; Miculescu 45+4'	Stadium: Tofiq Bahramov Republican Stadium; Attendance: 16,583; Referee: Filip Glova (Slovakia)

30 January 2025 8	FCSB (Romania)	0–2	(England) Manchester United	Bucharest
21:00 (22:00 UTC+2)		Report	Dalot 60'; Mainoo 68'	Stadium: Arena Națională; Attendance: 50,128; Referee: Harm Osmers (Germany)

==== Knockout phase ====
===== Knockout phase play-offs =====
The draw for the knockout phase play-offs was held on 31 January 2025.

13 February 2025 First leg	PAOK (Greece)	1–2	(Romania) FCSB	Thessaloniki, Greece
21:00 (22:00 UTC+2)	Samatta 21'	Report	Gheorghiță 50'; Dawa 60'	Stadium: Toumba Stadium; Attendance: 18,343; Referee: Lawrence Visser (Belgium)

20 February 2025 Second leg	FCSB (Romania)	2–0 (4–1 agg.)	(Greece) PAOK	Bucharest
18:45 (19:45 UTC+2)	Cisotti 30'; Miculescu 81'	Report		Stadium: Arena Națională; Attendance: 50,248; Referee: Matej Jug (Slovenia)

===== Round of 16 =====
The draw for the round of 16 was held on 21 February 2025.

6 March 2025 First leg	FCSB (Romania)	1–3	(France) Lyon	Bucharest
18:45 (19:45 UTC+2)	Băluță 68'	Report	Tagliafico 30'; Fofana 86', 89'	Stadium: Arena Națională; Attendance: 53,028; Referee: Tobias Stieler (Germany)

13 March 2025 Second leg	Lyon (France)	4–0 (7–1 agg.)	(Romania) FCSB	Décines-Charpieu, France
21:00 (22:00 UTC+2)	Mikautadze 14', 47'; Nuamah 37', 88'	Report		Stadium: Parc Olympique Lyonnais; Attendance: 37,322; Referee: Anthony Taylor (England)

== Statistics ==
=== Goalscorers ===
As of 23 May 2025

Rank	Position	Name	Liga I	Cupa României	Champions League	Europa League	Supercupa României	Total
1	FW	(Romania) Daniel Bîrligea	14	0	0	3	0	17
2	MF	(Romania) Darius Olaru	8	0	4	3	0	15
3	FW	(Romania) David Miculescu	6	0	3	3	1	13
4	FW	(Romania) Marius Ștefănescu	3	3	0	1	1	8
5	FW	(Romania) Alexandru Băluță	3	1	1	1	0	6
6	FW	(Romania) Florin Tănase	4	0	0	1	0	5
6	MF	(Italy) Juri Cisotti	4	0	0	1	0	5
8	DF	(Cameroon) Joyskim Dawa	1	0	2	1	0	4
8	MF	(Romania) Octavian Popescu	4	0	0	0	0	4
10	MF	(France) Malcom Edjouma	0	0	3	0	0	3
10	MF	(Romania) Alexandru Musi	3	0	0	0	0	3
10	MF	(Romania) Adrian Șut	1	0	0	2	0	3
13	FW	(Romania) Daniel Popa	0	0	2	0	0	2
13	FW	(Brazil) Luis Phelipe	0	1	0	0	1	2
13	MF	(Ghana) Baba Alhassan	2	0	0	0	0	2
16	MF	(Romania) Mihai Lixandru	1	0	0	0	0	1
16	MF	(Belgium) William Baeten	0	0	1	0	0	1
16	DF	(South Africa) Siyabonga Ngezana	1	0	0	0	0	1
16	DF	(Romania) Ionuț Panțîru	0	1	0	0	0	1
16	DF	(Romania) Valentin Crețu	1	0	0	0	0	1
16	FW	(Romania) Andrei Gheorghiță	0	0	0	1	0	1
16	FW	(France) Jordan Gele	1	0	0	0	0	1
16	DF	(Romania) Vlad Chiricheș	1	0	0	0	0	1
16	FW	(Romania) Alexandru Stoian	1	0	0	0	0	1
Own goal			1	0	0	0	0	1

=== Goal minutes ===
	1'–15'	16'–30'	31'–HT	46'–60'	61'–75'	76'–FT	Extra time	Forfeit
Goals	13	20	17	18	17	18	0	0
Percentage	12.62%	19.42%	16.5%	17.48%	16.5%	17.48%	0%	0%

Last updated: 23 May 2025 (UTC)
Source: FCSB (in Romanian)

=== Hat-tricks ===
Player	Against	Result	Date	Competition
(Romania) Darius Olaru	(San Marino) Virtus	1–7 (A)	9 July 2024	UEFA Champions League

Last updated: 19 September 2024 (UTC)
Source: FCSB (in Romanian)

=== Clean sheets ===
As of 23 May 2025

Rank	Name	Liga I	Cupa României	Champions League	Europa League	Supercupa României	Total	Games played
1	(Romania) Ștefan Târnovanu	16	1	1	6	0	24	58
2	(Romania) Andrei Vlad	0	0	1	0	1	2	3
3	(Romania) Mihai Udrea	1	0	0	0	0	1	2
4	(Czech Republic) Lukáš Zima	0	0	0	0	0	0	2

=== Disciplinary record ===
As of 23 May 2025

Rank	Position	Name	Liga I			Cupa României			Champions League			Europa League			Supercupa României			Total		
Rank	Position	Name	Yellow card	(yellow card) (yellow-red card)	Red card	Yellow card	(yellow card) (yellow-red card)	Red card	Yellow card	(yellow card) (yellow-red card)	Red card	Yellow card	(yellow card) (yellow-red card)	Red card	Yellow card	(yellow card) (yellow-red card)	Red card	Yellow card	(yellow card) (yellow-red card)	Red card
1	DF	(Cameroon) Joyskim Dawa	6	2	0	1	0	0	3	0	0	2	0	0	2	0	0	14	2	0
2	DF	(Romania) Mihai Popescu	3	0	2	2	0	0	0	0	0	2	0	0	0	0	0	7	0	2
3	MF	(Romania) Darius Olaru	3	0	1	0	0	0	1	0	0	2	1	0	0	0	0	6	1	1
4	FW	(Romania) Florin Tănase	5	1	0	0	0	0	0	0	0	4	0	0	0	0	0	9	1	0
4	MF	(Romania) Adrian Șut	7	1	0	0	0	0	0	0	0	2	0	0	0	0	0	9	1	0
6	MF	(Ghana) Baba Alhassan	5	0	1	1	0	0	0	0	0	2	0	0	0	0	0	8	0	1
7	DF	(South Africa) Siyabonga Ngezana	3	1	0	0	0	0	1	0	0	3	0	0	0	0	0	7	1	0
8	FW	(Romania) Daniel Bîrligea	4	0	0	0	0	0	0	0	0	2	1	0	0	0	0	6	1	0
9	DF	(Romania) Valentin Crețu	8	0	0	0	0	0	3	0	0	3	0	0	0	0	0	14	0	0
10	DF	(Montenegro) Risto Radunović	7	0	0	0	0	0	1	0	0	1	0	0	0	0	0	9	0	0
11	DF	(Romania) Vlad Chiricheș	6	0	0	0	0	0	0	0	0	2	0	0	0	0	0	8	0	0
11	FW	(Romania) David Miculescu	4	0	0	1	0	0	0	0	0	3	0	0	0	0	0	8	0	0
13	MF	(France) Malcom Edjouma	4	0	0	0	0	0	1	0	0	2	0	0	0	0	0	7	0	0
14	GK	(Romania) Ștefan Târnovanu	2	0	0	0	0	0	2	0	0	2	0	0	0	0	0	6	0	0
15	FW	(Romania) Alexandru Băluță	1	0	0	0	0	0	2	0	0	2	0	0	0	0	0	5	0	0
16	FW	(Brazil) Luis Phelipe	0	0	0	1	0	0	2	0	0	1	0	0	0	0	0	4	0	0
16	FW	(Romania) Daniel Popa	1	0	0	0	0	0	1	0	0	2	0	0	0	0	0	4	0	0
16	MF	(Italy) Juri Cisotti	4	0	0	0	0	0	0	0	0	0	0	0	0	0	0	4	0	0
16	MF	(Romania) Mihai Lixandru	2	0	0	0	0	0	2	0	0	0	0	0	0	0	0	4	0	0
16	MF	(Romania) Octavian Popescu	4	0	0	0	0	0	0	0	0	0	0	0	0	0	0	4	0	0
21	MF	(Romania) Alexandru Musi	2	0	0	0	0	0	1	0	0	0	0	0	0	0	0	3	0	0
22	MF	(Belgium) William Baeten	1	0	0	1	0	0	0	0	0	0	0	0	0	0	0	2	0	0
22	FW	(France) Jordan Gele	2	0	0	0	0	0	0	0	0	0	0	0	0	0	0	2	0	0
22	FW	(Romania) Andrei Gheorghiță	1	0	0	0	0	0	0	0	0	1	0	0	0	0	0	2	0	0
25	DF	(Romania) Alexandru Pantea	1	0	0	0	0	0	0	0	0	0	0	0	0	0	0	1	0	0
25	FW	(Romania) Marius Ștefănescu	0	0	0	0	0	0	0	0	0	1	0	0	0	0	0	1	0	0
25	DF	(Benin) David Kiki	0	0	0	0	0	0	1	0	0	0	0	0	0	0	0	1	0	0
25	DF	(Ghana) Nana Antwi	1	0	0	0	0	0	0	0	0	0	0	0	0	0	0	1	0	0
25	MF	(Romania) Mihai Toma	1	0	0	0	0	0	0	0	0	0	0	0	0	0	0	1	0	0

=== Attendances ===
As of 4 July 2024

	Matches	Attendances	Average	High	Low
Liga I	0	0	0	0	0
Cupa României	―	―	―	―	―
Champions League	0	0	0	0	0
Supercupa României	1	15,915	15,915	15,915	15,915
Total	1	15,915	15,915	15,915	15,915
