= Cociuba =

Cociuba may refer to several places in Romania:

- Cociuba, a village in Dieci Commune, Arad County
- Cociuba Mare, a commune in Bihor County
- Cociuba Mică, a village in Pietroasa Commune, Bihor County
