= Chesa =

Chesa may refer to:

- Cheșa, a village in Cociuba Mare Commune, Bihor County, Romania
- Chesa Boudin (born 1980), American lawyer
- Juan Antonio Chesa (born 1970), a Spanish retired football player
