= Ștefan Târnovanu =

Romanian footballer (born 2000)

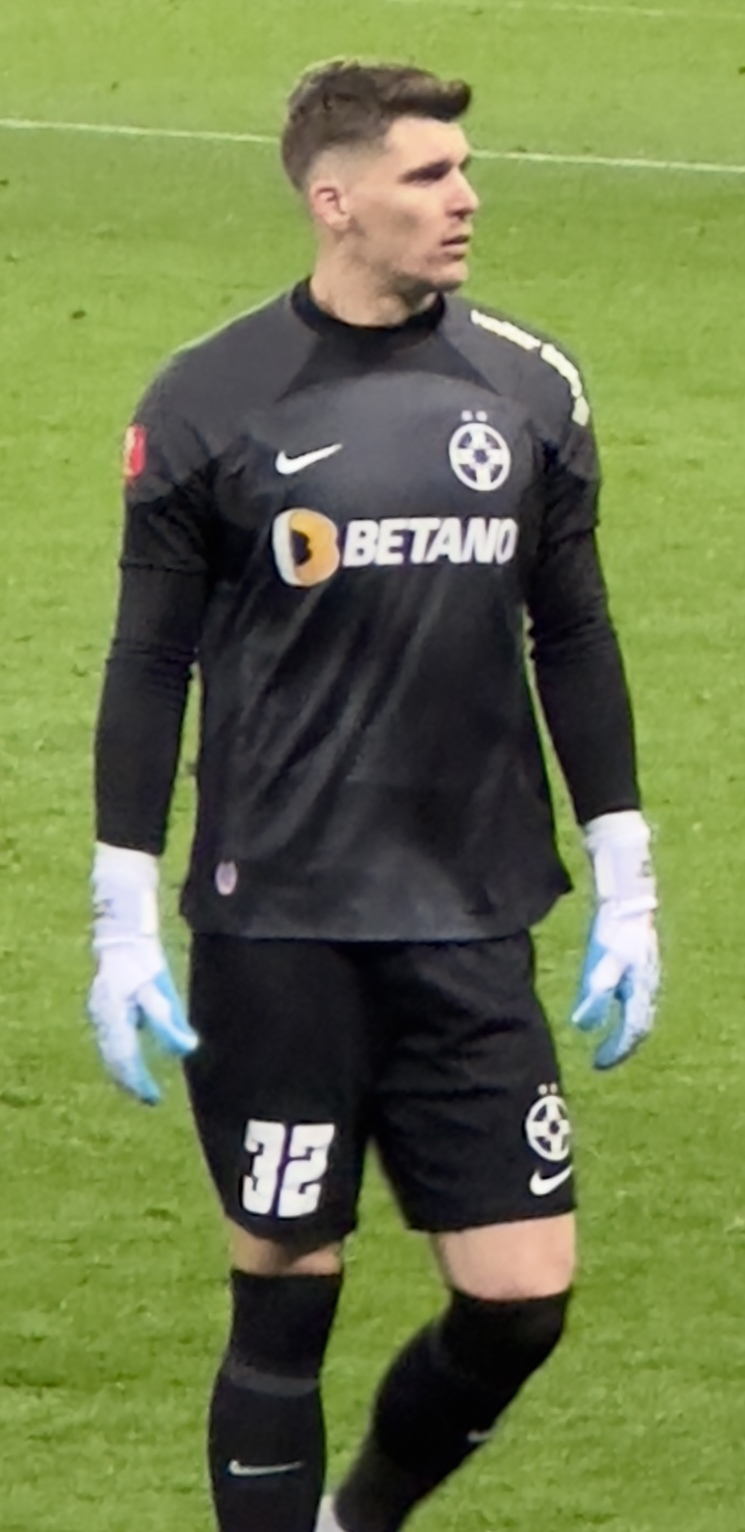
- Târnovanu with FCSB in 2023

Personal information
- Date of birth: 9 May 2000 (age 26)
- Place of birth: Iași, Romania
- Height: 1.97 m (6 ft 6 in)
- Position: Goalkeeper

Team information
- Current team: FCSB
- Number: 32

Youth career
- –2017: Politehnica Iași

Senior career*
Years	Team	Apps	(Gls)
2018–2020	Politehnica Iași	15	(0)
2018	→ Știința Miroslava (loan)	4	(0)
2019	→ Sportul Snagov (loan)	4	(0)
2020–	FCSB	166	(0)

International career^{‡}
2018	Romania U18	1	(0)
2018–2019	Romania U19	3	(0)
2022–2023	Romania U21	4	(0)
2022–	Romania	5	(0)
- * Club domestic league appearances and goals as of 22 November 2026 ‡ National team caps and goals as of 6 June 2026

Ștefan Târnovanu (born 9 May 2000) is a Romanian professional footballer who plays as a goalkeeper for Liga I club FCSB and the Romania national team.

== Club career ==
=== Early career ===
Târnovanu made his senior debut on 31 March 2018, aged 17, starting for Știința Miroslava in a 0–1 loss to Hermannstadt while on loan in the second league. On 30 November that year, he appeared for the first time in the Liga I for his boyhood club Politehnica Iași in a 1–1 home draw to Sepsi OSK.

Târnovanu was then again sent out on loan in the Liga II, moving to Sportul Snagov for the second half of the 2018–19 season.

=== FCSB ===
On 29 September 2019, it was announced that Târnovanu agreed a deal in advance to join FCSB the following summer. Politehnica Iași received €200,000 and also retained 15% interest on the capital gain of a possible future transfer. Târnovanu made his debut for the Roș-albaștrii on 19 May 2021, playing the full 90 minutes in a 0–1 league loss to Universitatea Craiova.

On 20 December, he kept a clean sheet in a draw against Sepsi OSK, being named one of the best players of the game by the Gazeta Sporturilor daily. Following some unconvincing performances of regular starter Andrei Vlad, Târnovanu became the first-choice goalkeeper at the club in March 2022.

In the 2023–24 season, Târnovanu aided FCSB in winning the national championship by making 39 appearances and having the most clean sheets (15).

== International career ==
In June 2021, Târnovanu was selected by manager Mirel Rădoi in Romania's squad for the postponed 2020 Summer Olympics, but did not feature in any match.

Târnovanu was called up to the senior team for the first time by coach Edward Iordănescu on 24 May 2022, for the four opening group games with Montenegro, Bosnia and Herzegovina, and Finland in the UEFA Nations League. He made his debut on 20 November that year, in a 5–0 away friendly win against Moldova.

On 7 June 2024, Târnovanu was named in Romania's squad for the Euro 2024, but did not play in any game.

== Personal life ==
In September 2018, media outlets reported that Târnovanu was temporarily removed from the Romania national under-19 team after shopping online with his roommate's bank card. The goalkeeper stated that "things were misunderstood" and he and Andrei Cristea-David are friends.

== Career statistics ==
=== Club ===
As of match played 22 November 2026

Appearances and goals by club, season and competition
Club	Season	League			Cupa României		Europe		Other		Total	
Club	Season	Division	Apps	Goals	Apps	Goals	Apps	Goals	Apps	Goals	Apps	Goals
Politehnica Iași	2018–19	Liga I	2	0	0	0	―		―		2	0
Politehnica Iași	2019–20	Liga I	13	0	1	0	―		―		14	0
Politehnica Iași	Total		15	0	1	0	―		―		16	0
Știința Miroslava (loan)	2017–18	Liga II	4	0	0	0	―		―		4	0
Sportul Snagov (loan)	2018–19	Liga II	4	0	―		―		―		4	0
FCSB	2020–21	Liga I	2	0	0	0	0	0	0	0	2	0
FCSB	2021–22	Liga I	13	0	0	0	0	0	―		13	0
FCSB	2022–23	Liga I	37	0	0	0	12 (Note: Appearances in UEFA Europa Conference League)	0	―		49	0
FCSB	2023–24	Liga I	39	0	0	0	4	0	―		43	0
FCSB	2024–25	Liga I	38	0	2	0	18 (Note: Five appearances in UEFA Champions League, thirteen appearances in UEFA Europa League)	0	0	0	58	0
FCSB	2025–26	Liga I	24	0	0	0	15 (Note: Four appearances in UEFA Champions League, eleven appearances in UEFA Europa League)	0	3 (Note: One appearance in Supercupa României, two appearances in Liga I European play-offs)	0	42	0
FCSB	2026–27	Liga I	13	0	0	0	2	0	―		15	0
FCSB	Total		166	0	2	0	51	0	3	0	222	0
Career total			189	0	3	0	51	0	3	0	246	0

=== International ===
As of match played 6 June 2026

Appearances and goals by national team and year
National team	Year	Apps	Goals
Romania
Romania	2022	1	0
Romania	2023	0	0
Romania	2024	2	0
Romania	2025	1	0
Romania	2026	1	0
Total		5	0

== Honours ==
FCSB

- Liga I: 2023–24, 2024–25
- Supercupa României: 2024, 2025

Individual

- Liga I Team of the Season: 2023–24, 2024–25
- Liga I most clean sheets: 2023–24, 2024–25
