= Ionuț Panțîru =

Romanian footballer (born 1996)

Personal information
- Full name: Ionuț Constantin Panțîru
- Date of birth: 22 March 1996 (age 30)
- Place of birth: Iași, Romania
- Height: 1.79 m (5 ft 10 1/2 in)
- Position: Left back

Team information
- Current team: Gloria Băneasa
- Number: 3

Youth career
- 2009–2013: LPS Iași
- 2013–2014: Gheorghe Hagi Academy
- 2014–2015: LPS Iași

Senior career*
Years	Team	Apps	(Gls)
2015	Sighetu Marmației		
2016–2017	Știința Miroslava	14	(3)
2017–2019	Politehnica Iași	61	(2)
2019–2025	FCSB	58	(1)
2025	Voluntari	13	(0)
2025–2026	Tunari	15	(0)
2026	Gloria Bistrița	3	(0)
2026–	Gloria Băneasa	0	(0)
- * Club domestic league appearances and goals as of 15 August 2026

Ionuț Constantin Panțîru (born 22 March 1996) is a Romanian professional footballer who plays as a left back for Liga III club Gloria Băneasa

== Club career ==
=== Politehnica Iași ===
In January 2017, after a year in the Romanian third league with Știința Miroslava, Panțîru moved to Liga I club Politehnica Iași. He subsequently signed a five-year deal with his new team.

On 17 November 2017, Panțîru scored his first goal for Politehnica, in a Liga I game against FCSB, and helped his team earn a 1–0 victory.

=== FCSB ===
Before putting pen to paper with FCSB, Pantîru was accused of having made explicit videos through an adult site.

In April 2021, Panțiru was seriously injured after colliding with a teammate on the field. Two operations in Italy followed and 11 months off. The recovery did not go well, so he underwent a third surgery and was subsequently sidelined for another 8 months.

== Career statistics ==
As of 25 September 2026

Appearances and goals by club, season and competition
Club	Season	League			Cupa României		Europe		Other		Total	
Club	Season	Division	Apps	Goals	Apps	Goals	Apps	Goals	Apps	Goals	Apps	Goals
Știința Miroslava	2016–17	Liga III	14	3	0	0	—		—		14	3
Politehnica Iași	2016–17	Liga I	12	0	2	0	—		—		14	0
Politehnica Iași	2017–18	Liga I	25	1	1	0	—		—		26	1
Politehnica Iași	2018–19	Liga I	21	1	0	0	—		—		21	1
Politehnica Iași	2019–20	Liga I	3	0	0	0	—		—		3	0
Politehnica Iași	Total		61	2	3	0	—		—		64	2
FCSB	2019–20	Liga I	24	0	3	0	4 (Note: Appearances in UEFA Europa League)	1	—		31	1
FCSB	2020–21	Liga I	22	1	1	0	3	0	1 (Note: Appearance in Supercupa României)	0	27	1
FCSB	2021–22	Liga I	0	0	0	0	0	0	—		0	0
FCSB	2022–23	Liga I	0	0	0	0	0	0	—		0	0
FCSB	2023–24	Liga I	4	0	1	0	0	0	—		5	0
FCSB	2024–25	Liga I	8	0	3	1	1 (Note: Appearance in UEFA Champions League)	0	0	0	12	1
FCSB	Total		58	1	8	1	8	1	1	0	75	3
Voluntari	2024–25	Liga II	13	0	—		—		2 (Note: Appearances in Liga I promotion/relegation play-offs)	0	15	0
Tunari	2025–26	Liga II	15	0	—		—		—		15	0
Gloria Bistrița	2026–27	Liga II	3	0	—		—		—		3	0
Gloria Băneasa	2026–27	Liga III	0	0	—		—		—		0	0
Career total			164	6	11	1	8	1	3	0	186	8

== Honours ==
FCSB

- Liga I: 2023–24, 2024–25
- Cupa României: 2019–20
- Supercupa României: 2024
