= Ioana Bortan =

Romanian footballer and manager (born 1989)

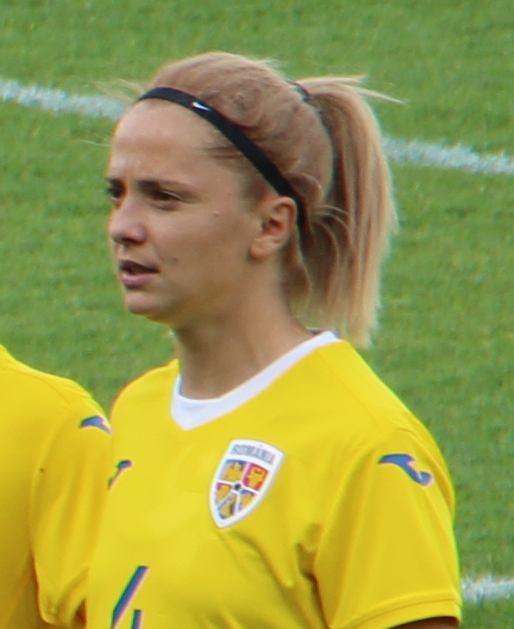
- Bortan in 2022

Personal information
- Full name: Ioana Andrada Bortan
- Date of birth: 23 January 1989 (age 37)
- Place of birth: Sighișoara, Romania
- Position: Midfielder

Team information
- Current team: Gloria Bistrița (assistant coach)

Senior career*
| Years | Team | Apps | (Gls) |
| 2008–2010 | Clujana | | |
| 2010–2020 | Olimpia Cluj | | |
| 2020 | Kuopion Palloseura | | |
| 2021–2023 | Olimpia Cluj | | |
| 2023–2025 | Farul Constanța | | |
| 2025 | Atletic Olimpia Gherla | | |

International career
| 2010–2025 | Romania | 145 | |

Managerial career
- 2018–2023: Olimpia Cluj
- 2026–: Gloria Bistrița (assistant coach)
- * Club domestic league appearances and goals

Ioana Andrada Bortan (born 23 January 1989) is a Romanian football midfielder and manager currently under assistant coach for Gloria Bistrița in the Romanian First League. She has played the Champions League with CFF Clujana and Olimpia, and she was a member of the Romanian national team.
