= Daniel Bîrligea =

Romanian footballer (born 2000)

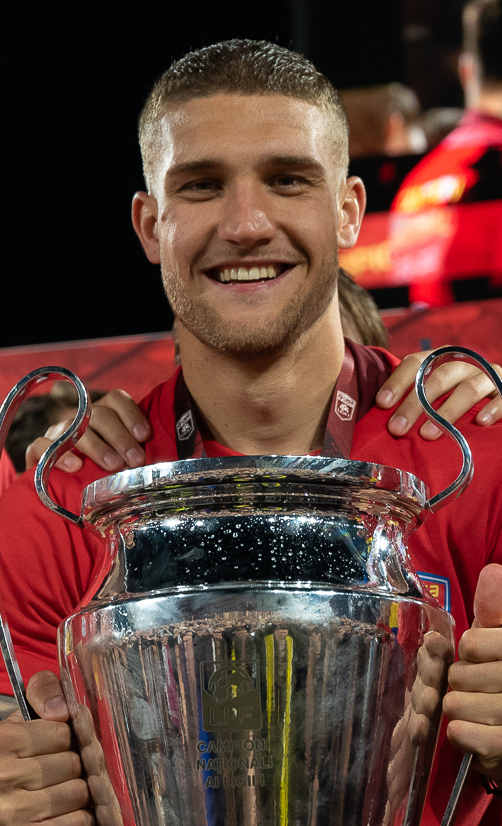
- Bîrligea with CFR Cluj in 2022

Personal information
- Full name: George Daniel Bîrligea
- Date of birth: 19 April 2000 (age 26)
- Place of birth: Brăila, Romania
- Height: 1.84 m (6 ft 0 in)
- Position: Forward

Team information
- Current team: Frosinone (on loan from FCSB)
- Number: 11

Youth career
- –2009: Metalul Constanța
- 2009–2010: Gheorghe Hagi Academy
- 2010–2012: Luceafărul Brăila
- 2012–2016: Cantèra Ribolla
- 2016–2019: Palermo

Senior career*
Years	Team	Apps	(Gls)
2019–2022	Teramo	32	(4)
2022–2024	CFR Cluj	82	(22)
2024–	FCSB	54	(24)
2026–	→ Frosinone (loan)	6	(2)

International career^{‡}
2022–2023	Romania U21	13	(4)
2023–	Romania	13	(4)
- * Club domestic league appearances and goals as of 8 November 2026 ‡ National team caps and goals as of 17 November 2026

George Daniel Bîrligea (Romanian pronunciation: [ˈdʒe̯ordʒe daniˈel bɨrˈlidʒe̯a]; born 19 April 2000) is a Romanian professional footballer who plays as a forward for Serie A club Frosinone, on loan from Liga I club FCSB, and the Romania national team.

Raised in Italy from age 12, Bîrligea started his senior career with Serie C club Teramo in 2020. Two years later, he returned to his native country at defending champions CFR Cluj. In 2024, he transferred to domestic rivals FCSB for an eventual fee of €3 million, matching the highest fee paid by a Liga I side.

At international level, Bîrligea made his full debut for Romania in October 2023, in a 4–0 UEFA Euro qualifier win over Andorra. The next year, he was selected in the squad for Euro 2024.

== Club career ==
=== Early career ===
Born in Brăila, Bîrligea spent part of his childhood in Constanța, where he started practising young football with local club Metalul. He also trained at the Gheorghe Hagi Academy, before returning to his native city at Luceafărul Brăila.

Bîrligea relocated again at age 12, moving abroad to Italy with his mother and elder sister, and represented the academies of ASD Cantera Ribolla and Palermo.

After the bankruptcy of Palermo, Bîrligea moved to Teramo in 2019. On 22 January 2020, he made his senior debut for in a 1–0 Serie C win over Catanzaro. Over the course of two years with Il diavolo, he amassed seven goals from 43 appearances in all competitions.

=== CFR Cluj ===
On 26 January 2022, Bîrligea returned to Romania by signing with four-time defending champions CFR Cluj. He made his debut on 5 February, coming on as a 87th-minute substitute for Claudiu Petrila in a 1–1 Liga I draw at Universitatea Craiova. Bîrligea scored his first goal for CFR Cluj on 1 May, in a 1–0 league defeat of Farul Constanța. Two weeks later, he started in a 2–1 home victory over Universitatea Craiova, as his club was crowned national champion one fixture prior to the end of the season.

On 20 October 2022, Bîrligea scored his first Cluj derby goal in a 1–1 away draw with Universitatea Cluj in the Cupa României group stage. On 10 November, he netted his first career hat-trick in a 5–0 defeat of Dumbrăvița, also in the national cup. On 16 February 2023, Bîrligea recorded his European debut by starting in a 0–1 away loss to Lazio in the knockout round play-offs of the UEFA Europa Conference League. On 9 April, he opened the scoring in a 1–1 home Liga I draw with rivals FCSB.

Bîrligea scored his first league hat-trick on 6 April 2024, in a 1–4 away thrashing of Rapid București. In the 2023–24 campaign, he appeared in all 40 Liga I fixtures—of which he started in 33—and was the team's second-highest goalscorer in the competition with 14 goals. On 1 August that year, Bîrligea scored his first two European goals in a 5–0 away win over Neman Grodno in the Conference League second qualifying round.

=== FCSB ===
On 2 September 2024, a deal was agreed for the move of Bîrligea to CFR Cluj's domestic rivals FCSB, subject to a medical. Rapid București made a last-minute attempt to hijack the deal, but he was officially unveiled by FCSB the following day and handed the number 9 shirt.

According to CFR Cluj owner Neluțu Varga, the initial transfer fee was €2 million plus a 15% sell-on clause, with performance-related bonuses potentially raising the total value to €3.5 million. In October 2025, FCSB owner Gigi Becali stated that the club's expenditure on Bîrligea reached €3 million, (Note: The figure stated by Becali included the initial €2 million fee, previously triggered performance bonuses amounting to €600,000, and an additional €400,000 paid to buy out all remaining contract clauses. As part of the renegotiation, CFR Cluj's sell-on percentage was reduced to 10%, applicable only to any future transfer fee exceeding €10 million.) making him the joint-most expensive signing in Liga I alongside Cristian Fabbiani and Florinel Coman.

Bîrligea made his debut for "the Red-Blues" on 21 September 2024, starting and coming off at half-time in a 1–1 Liga I draw with Petrolul Ploiești at the Steaua Stadium. Five days later, he opened the scoring in a 4–1 defeat of RFS in the first fixture of the Europa League league phase. On 3 October 2024, he scored the only goal of an away win at Greek reigning champions PAOK in the same competition.

On 20 October 2024, Bîrligea netted his second league goal for FCSB, a scissor kick in a 2–0 away derby win at Dinamo București. On 7 November 2024, he scored in a 2–0 Europa League home victory against Midtjylland. Three days later, he netted his first brace for FCSB in a 2–1 away victory over Universitatea Cluj in the Liga I.

Despite injury setbacks late in the 2024–25 season, Bîrligea finished as the league's third-highest scorer with 16 goals—two of them for CFR Cluj—as FCSB secured back-to-back Liga I titles. He opened his account for the 2025–26 campaign on 7 August, scoring twice in a 3–2 home win over Kosovan side Drita in the Europa League third qualifying round.

Following FCSB's second consecutive qualification for the Europa League league phase, Bîrligea managed to score in their 1–2 home loss to Bologna on 23 October 2025, and in a 1–4 away defeat against Dinamo Zagreb on 22 January 2026.

==== Loan to Frosinone ====
In late August 2026, Serie A club Frosinone agreed terms to sign Bîrligea on an initial one-year loan for €1.5 million, with a €3.5 million obligation to buy if the club avoids relegation. He was officially unveiled on 27 August.

== International career ==
=== Youth ===
Bîrligea made his debut for the Romania national under-21 team on 25 March 2022, equalising late in an eventual 2–1 friendly win against Finland at the Stadionul Arcul de Triumf in Bucharest. In June 2023, he was selected by manager Emil Săndoi in the squad for the 2023 UEFA European Under-21 Championship.

=== Senior ===
In September 2023, Bîrligea received his first call-up to the Romania national team for the Euro 2024 qualifying matches against Israel and Kosovo. He made his debut on 15 October that year, starting in a 4–0 home win over Andorra in the same competition. On 7 June 2024, he was selected in Romania's squad for the final tournament, but did not feature in any game.

On 18 November 2024, Bîrligea scored his first senior international goal by opening a 4–1 Nations League win against Cyprus.

== Style of play ==
Bîrligea is a determined and physical forward, focused on exploiting spaces and contributing to his team's pressing efforts. Although primarily a striker, he can also play as a winger, utilising his high work rate to challenge defences. His play is defined by persistence and an understanding of goalscoring opportunities.

== Personal life ==
Bîrligea's parents separated when he was around eight or nine years old, and he was raised mainly by his mother. He stated that after relocating to Palermo at age 12, he managed to completely understand Italian and speak it well in only six months.

== Career statistics ==
=== Club ===
As of match played 8 November 2026

Appearances and goals by club, season and competition
Club	Season	League			National cup (Note: Includes Coppa Italia Serie C, Coppa Italia, Cupa României)		Europe		Other		Total	
Club	Season	Division	Apps	Goals	Apps	Goals	Apps	Goals	Apps	Goals	Apps	Goals
Teramo	2019–20	Serie C	8	1	4	0	—		1 (Note: Appearance in Serie C promotion play-offs)	0	13	1
Teramo	2020–21	Serie C	8	1	2	0	—		1	0	11	1
Teramo	2021–22	Serie C	16	2	3	3	—		—		19	5
Teramo	Total		32	4	9	3	—		2	0	43	7
CFR Cluj	2021–22	Liga I	6	1	—		—		—		6	1
CFR Cluj	2022–23	Liga I	31	5	4	4	2 (Note: Appearances in UEFA Conference League)	0	1 (Note: Appearance in Liga I European play-offs)	0	38	9
CFR Cluj	2023–24	Liga I	40	14	4	1	2	0	—		46	15
CFR Cluj	2024–25	Liga I	5	2	—		6	2	—		11	4
CFR Cluj	Total		82	22	8	5	10	2	1	0	101	29
FCSB	2024–25	Liga I	24	14	2	0	9 (Note: Appearances in UEFA Europa League)	3	—		35	17
FCSB	2025–26	Liga I	24	7	2	1	11 (Note: One appearances in UEFA Champions League, ten appearances and five goals in UEFA Europa League)	5	0	0	37	13
FCSB	2026–27	Liga I	6	3	—		2	0	—		8	3
FCSB	Total		54	24	4	1	22	8	0	0	80	33
Frosinone (loan)	2026–27	Seria A	6	2	1	0	—		—		7	2
Career total			174	52	22	9	32	10	3	0	231	71

=== International ===
As of match played 17 November 2026

Appearances and goals by national team and year
National team	Year	Apps	Goals
Romania
Romania	2023	1	0
Romania	2024	2	1
Romania	2025	4	1
Romania	2026	6	2
Total		13	4

Scores and results list Romania's goal tally first, score column indicates score after each Bîrligea goal.

List of international goals scored by Daniel Bîrligea
No.	Date	Venue	Opponent	Score	Result	Competition
1	18 November 2024	Arena Națională, Bucharest, Romania	Cyprus	1–0	4–1	2024–25 UEFA Nations League C
2	15 November 2025	Bilino Polje Stadium, Zenica, Bosnia and Herzegovina	Bosnia and Herzegovina	1–0	1–3	2026 FIFA World Cup qualification
3	28 September 2026	Arena Națională, Bucharest, Romania	Bosnia and Herzegovina	1–2	2–4	2026–27 UEFA Nations League B
4	17 November 2026	Bilino Polje Stadium, Zenica, Bosnia and Herzegovina	Bosnia and Herzegovina	1–0	1–2	2026–27 UEFA Nations League B

== Honours ==
CFR Cluj

- Liga I: 2021–22
- Supercupa României runner-up: 2022

FCSB

- Liga I: 2024–25
- Supercupa României: 2025

Individual

- Liga I Team of the Season: 2024–25
