= Adrian Șut =

Romanian footballer (born 1999)

Personal information
- Full name: Adrian Gheorghe Șut
- Date of birth: 30 April 1999 (age 27)
- Place of birth: Cociuba Mare, Romania
- Height: 1.86 m (6 ft 1 in)
- Position: Defensive midfielder

Team information
- Current team: Levadiakos (on loan from Al Ain)
- Number: 15

Youth career
- 2006–2011: Izvorul Cociuba Mare
- 2011–2013: Liberty Salonta
- 2013–2017: ASA Târgu Mureș

Senior career*
Years	Team	Apps	(Gls)
2016	ASA Târgu Mureș	2	(0)
2017	Unirea Jucu		
2017–2018	Pandurii Târgu Jiu	29	(3)
2018–2019	Academica Clinceni	33	(5)
2019–2026	FCSB	162	(13)
2019–2020	→ Academica Clinceni (loan)	30	(6)
2026–	Al Ain	11	(1)
2026–	→ Levadiakos (loan)	8	(0)

International career^{‡}
2024–	Romania	8	(0)
- * Club domestic league appearances and goals as of 8 November 2026 ‡ National team caps and goals as of 9 September 2025

Adrian Gheorghe Șut (Romanian pronunciation: [adriˈan ˈɡe̯orɡe ˈʃut]; born 30 April 1999) is a Romanian professional footballer who plays as a defensive midfielder for Super League Greece club Levadiakos, on loan from UAE Pro League club Al Ain, and the Romania national team.

== Club career ==
=== Early career ===
Born in Cociuba Mare, Bihor County, Șut played youth football for local side Izvorul, Liberty Salonta, and ASA Târgu Mureș. He registered his professional debut for the latter on 2 May 2016, aged 17, in a 1–6 away Liga I loss to Viitorul Constanța.

Șut went on to represent Unirea Jucu, Pandurii Târgu Jiu, and Academica Clinceni in the lower leagues, before returning to the top flight by signing for FCSB in the summer of 2019. He was immediately loaned back to Clinceni for one season.

=== FCSB ===
Șut made his debut for FCSB on 24 September 2020, starting in a 0–2 loss to Slovan Liberec in the UEFA Europa League third qualifying round. He amassed 27 appearances during his first campaign in Bucharest, of which 24 in the national league.

His first goal for the Roș-albaștrii came on 28 November 2021, in a 3–2 away defeat of title contenders Universitatea Craiova. On 22 May 2022, Șut scored twice in a 3–1 win over CFR Cluj, which had mathematically clinched the Liga I trophy the previous fixture.

== International career ==
On 7 June 2024, Șut was selected in Romania's squad for the UEFA Euro 2024, but did not feature in any match.

== Career statistics ==
=== Club ===
As of match played 8 November 2026

Appearances and goals by club, season and competition
Club	Season	League			National cup (Note: Includes Cupa României, UAE President's Cup)		Continental		Other		Total	
Club	Season	Division	Apps	Goals	Apps	Goals	Apps	Goals	Apps	Goals	Apps	Goals
ASA Târgu Mureș	2015–16	Liga I	2	0	—		—		—		2	0
ASA Târgu Mureș	2016–17	Liga I	0	0	0	0	—		0	0	0	0
ASA Târgu Mureș	Total		2	0	0	0	—		0	0	2	0
Unirea Jucu	2016–17	Liga III	?	?	—		—		—		?	?
Pandurii Târgu Jiu	2017–18	Liga II	29	3	0	0	—		—		29	3
Academica Clinceni	2018–19	Liga II	33	5	1	0	—		—		34	5
Academica Clinceni (loan)	2019–20	Liga I	30	6	3	0	—		—		33	6
FCSB	2020–21	Liga I	24	0	1	0	1 (Note: Appearance in UEFA Europa League)	0	1 (Note: Appearance in Supercupa României)	0	27	0
FCSB	2021–22	Liga I	25	3	1	0	0	0	—		26	3
FCSB	2022–23	Liga I	32	5	1	0	4 (Note: Appearances in UEFA Europa Conference League)	0	—		37	5
FCSB	2023–24	Liga I	36	3	3	0	3	0	—		42	3
FCSB	2024–25	Liga I	30	1	2	0	19 (Note: Six appearances in UEFA Champions League, thirteen appearances and two goals in UEFA Europa League)	2	0	0	51	3
FCSB	2025–26	Liga I	15	1	1	0	12 (Note: Four appearances in UEFA Champions League, eight appearances and one goal in UEFA Europa League)	1	1	0	29	2
FCSB	Total		162	13	9	0	39	3	2	0	212	16
Al Ain	2025–26	UAE Pro League	11	1	2	0	0	0	1 (Note: Appearances in UAE League Cup)	0	14	1
Levadiakos (loan)	2026–27	Super League Greece	8	0	0	0	—		—		8	0
Career total			275	28	15	0	39	3	3	0	332	31

=== International ===
As of match played 9 September 2025

Appearances and goals by national team and year
National team	Year	Apps	Goals
Romania
Romania	2024	4	0
Romania	2025	4	0
Total		8	0

== Honours ==
FCSB

- Liga I: 2023–24, 2024–25
- Supercupa României: 2024, 2025

Al Ain

- UAE Pro League: 2025–26
- UAE President's Cup: 2025–26
- UAE League Cup runner-up: 2025–26

Individual

- Liga I Team of the Season: 2022–23, 2024–25
