= William Baeten =

Belgian footballer (born 1997)

Personal information
- Full name: William Guido R Baeten
- Date of birth: 7 February 1997 (age 29)
- Place of birth: Houthalen-Helchteren, Belgium
- Height: 1.81 m (5 ft 11 in)
- Positions: Midfielder; winger

Youth career
- Genk
- –2016: Sint-Truiden

Senior career*
Years	Team	Apps	(Gls)
2016–2019	Dessel	64	(6)
2019–2020	Patro Eisden	21	(1)
2020–2024	FC U Craiova	120	(19)
2024–2025	FCSB	9	(1)
2025–2026	Flamurtari	12	(2)
2026–	Drita	4	(0)
- * Club domestic league appearances and goals as of 7 August 2025

William Guido R Baeten (born 7 February 1997) is a Belgian professional footballer who plays as a midfielder or a winger.

== Career ==
=== Early career ===
Baeten began his senior career at Dessel, making his debut in a 6–0 Belgian Cup thrashing of Patro Eisden on 27 August 2016. He came on as a 60th-minute substitute for Leo Njengo and scored the last goal of the match.

Baeten spent three years at the Belgian National Division 1 club, before joining fellow league team Patro Eisden in 2019.

=== FC U Craiova ===
Baeten moved abroad for the first time in the summer of 2020, signing a one-year contract with the option of another two years with Romanian club FC U Craiova. He scored his first goal on 25 October, in a 1–0 away Liga II victory over Petrolul Ploiești.

Baeten amassed 23 league appearances and two goals during his first season in Oltenia, as FC U Craiova achieved Liga I promotion from first place. On 16 July 2021, he netted a goal in a 2–3 away loss to defending champions CFR Cluj in the campaign's opener.

=== FCSB ===
On 13 July 2024, amid interest from CFR Cluj and Rapid București, Baeten was transferred to FCSB for €300,000, with FC U Craiova retaining 50% participation rights in a co-ownership deal.

He made his club and European debut on 23 July, in a 1–1 home draw with Maccabi Tel Aviv in the UEFA Champions League second qualifying round, and eight days later scored the only goal of the second leg at the Bozsik Aréna in Budapest.

== Style of play ==
Baeten possesses versatility across various midfield positions, including defensive, central, and offensive roles, and he also demonstrates proficiency as a right winger.

== Career statistics ==
As of match played 14 January 2026

Appearances and goals by club, season and competition
Club	Season	League			National cup (Note: Includes Belgian Cup, Cupa României and Albanian Cup)		Continental		Other		Total	
Club	Season	Division	Apps	Goals	Apps	Goals	Apps	Goals	Apps	Goals	Apps	Goals
Dessel	2016–17	Belgian National Division 1	27	2	2	1	—		—		29	3
Dessel	2017–18	Belgian National Division 1	23	4	—		—		—		23	4
Dessel	2018–19	Belgian National Division 1	14	0	2	0	—		—		16	0
Dessel	Total		64	6	4	1	—		—		68	7
Patro Eisden	2019–20	Belgian National Division 1	21	1	—		—		—		21	1
FC U Craiova	2020–21	Liga II	23	2	1	0	—		—		24	2
FC U Craiova	2021–22	Liga I	32	7	1	0	—		—		33	7
FC U Craiova	2022–23	Liga I	31	4	3	0	—		2 (Note: Appearances in Liga I European play-offs)	1	36	5
FC U Craiova	2023–24	Liga I	34	6	1	0	—		—		35	6
FC U Craiova	Total		120	19	6	0	—		2	1	128	20
FCSB	2024–25	Liga I	9	0	2	0	7 (Note: Four appearances and one goal in UEFA Champions League, three appearances in UEFA Europa League)	1	—		18	1
Flamurtari	2025–26	Kategoria Superiore	10	0	2	2	—		—		12	2
Career total			224	26	14	3	7	1	2	1	247	31

== Honours ==
FC U Craiova

- Liga II: 2020–21

FCSB

- Liga I: 2024–25
