= David Kiki =

Beninese footballer

Personal information
- Full name: Enagnon David Kiki
- Date of birth: 25 November 1993 (age 32)
- Place of birth: Vakon, Benin
- Height: 1.80 m (5 ft 11 in)
- Positions: Defender; midfielder

Team information
- Current team: Voluntari
- Number: 25

Youth career
- –2009: Académie France-Bénin
- 2009–2012: Belfort

Senior career*
Years	Team	Apps	(Gls)
2012–2015	Belfort	52	(7)
2015–2017	Chamois Niortais	59	(2)
2017–2020	Brest	11	(0)
2019	→ Red Star (loan)	7	(0)
2020–2021	Montana	23	(1)
2021–2022	Arda Kardzhali	23	(0)
2022–2024	Farul Constanța	63	(1)
2024–2026	FCSB	9	(0)
2026–	Voluntari	3	(0)

International career^{‡}
2015–	Benin	56	(0)
- * Club domestic league appearances and goals as of 9 October 2026 ‡ National team caps and goals as of 18 November 2025

Enagnon David Kiki (born 25 November 1993) is a Beninese professional footballer who plays for Liga I club Voluntari and the Benin national team. A left-sided player, Kiki has played in both defence and midfield.

== Club career ==
Between 2012 and 2015, Kiki played in the Championnat de France amateur with Belfort, making 52 league appearances in total for the club. He joined Ligue 2 club Chamois Niortais ahead of the 2015–16 season, and made his debut in the 0–0 draw away at Évian Thonon Gaillard on 21 August 2015.

In January 2019, he was loaned to Red Star from Brest.

== International career ==
Kiki won his first international cap for Benin on 14 June 2015, in a 1–1 draw with Equatorial Guinea. He played at the 2019 Africa Cup of Nations where the team reached the quarter-finals.

== Career statistics ==
=== Club ===
As of match played 29 October 2026

Appearances and goals by club, season and competition
Club	Season	League			National cup (Note: Includes Coupe de France, Bulgarian Cup, Cupa României)		Europe		Other		Total	
Club	Season	Division	Apps	Goals	Apps	Goals	Apps	Goals	Apps	Goals	Apps	Goals
Belfort	2012–13	CFA	8	0	0	0	—		—		8	0
Belfort	2013–14	CFA	23	4	1	0	—		—		24	4
Belfort	2014–15	CFA	21	3	0	0	—		—		21	3
Belfort	Total		52	7	1	0	—		—		53	7
Chamois Niortais	2015–16	Ligue 2	25	1	3	0	—		0	0	28	1
Chamois Niortais	2016–17	Ligue 2	31	1	5	0	—		1 (Note: Appearance in Coupe de la Ligue)	0	37	1
Chamois Niortais	2017–18	Ligue 2	3	0	0	0	—		1	0	4	0
Chamois Niortais	Total		59	2	8	0	—		2	0	69	2
Brest	2017–18	Ligue 2	9	0	0	0	—		—		9	0
Brest	2018–19	Ligue 2	2	0	1	0	—		1	0	4	0
Brest	Total		11	0	1	0	—		1	0	13	0
Red Star (loan)	2018–19	Ligue 2	7	0	—		—		—		7	0
Montana	2020–21	First League	23	1	1	0	—		—		24	1
Arda Kardzhali	2021–22	First League	23	0	1	0	—		—		24	0
Farul Constanța	2022–23	Liga I	38	1	2	0	—		—		40	1
Farul Constanța	2023–24	Liga I	25	0	0	0	8 (Note: Two appearances and one goal in UEFA Champions League, six appearances in UEFA Europa Conference League)	1	1 (Note: Appearance in Supercupa României)	0	34	1
Farul Constanța	Total		63	1	2	0	8	1	1	0	74	2
FCSB	2024–25	Liga I	5	0	2	0	2 (Note: Appearances in UEFA Champions League)	0	0	0	9	0
FCSB	2025–26	Liga I	4	0	2	0	2 (Note: Appearance in UEFA Europa League)	0	0	0	8	0
FCSB	Total		9	0	4	0	4	0	0	0	17	0
Voluntari	2026–27	Liga I	3	0	3	0	—		—		6	0
Career total			250	11	21	0	12	1	4	0	287	12

=== International ===
As of matches played on 18 November 2025

Appearances and goals by national team and year
National team	Year	Apps	Goals
Benin	2015	5	0
Benin	2016	4	0
Benin	2017	6	0
Benin	2018	2	0
Benin	2019	8	0
Benin	2020	2	0
Benin	2021	5	0
Benin	2022	7	0
Benin	2023	7	0
Benin	2024	6	0
Benin	2025	4	0
Total		56	0

== Honours ==
Farul Constanța

- Liga I: 2022–23
- Supercupa României runner-up: 2023

FCSB

- Liga I: 2024–25
- Supercupa României: 2024, 2025
