= Mihai Udrea =

Romanian association football player

Răzvan Udrea
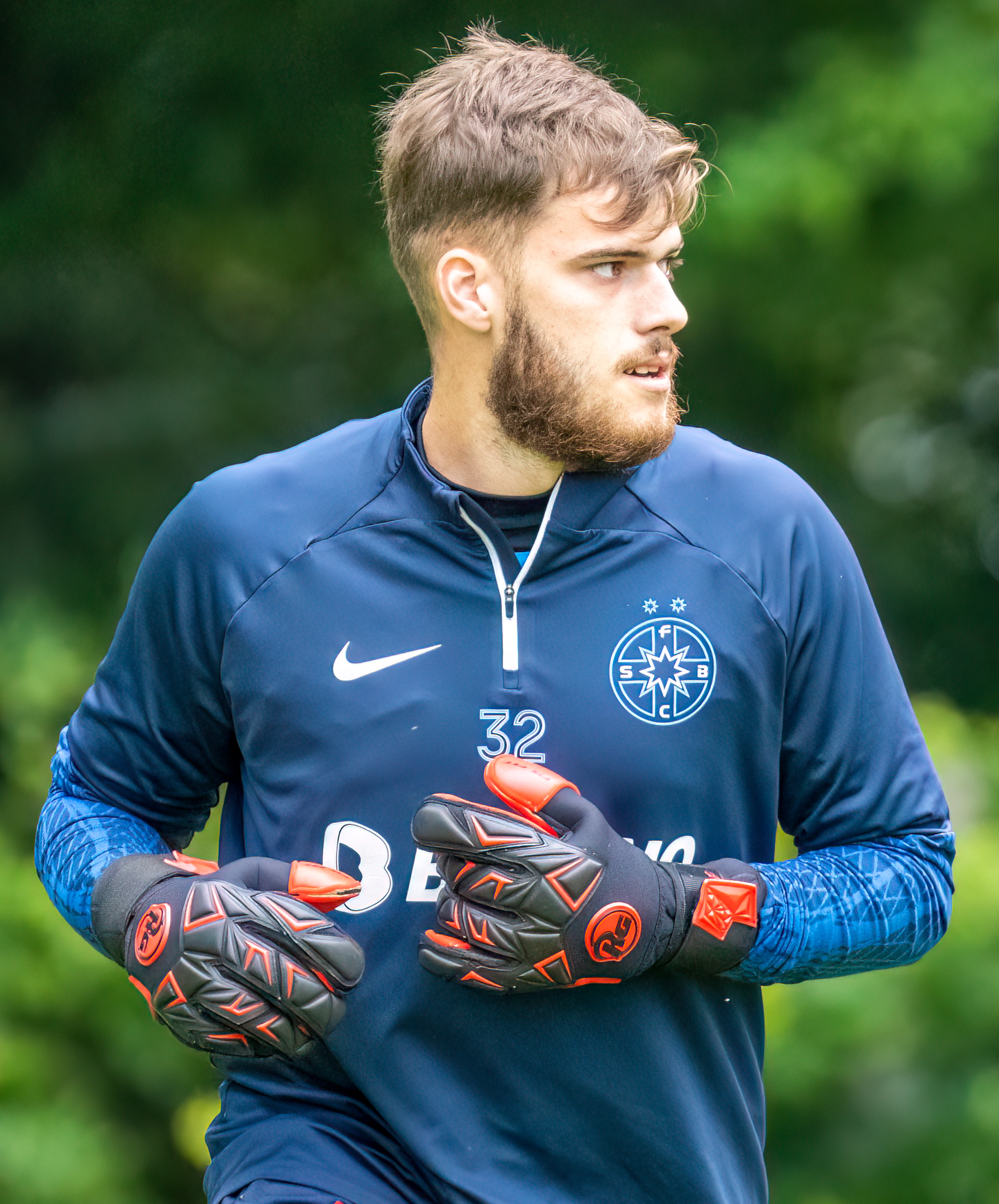
- Udrea in 2023 with FCSB

Personal information
- Full name: Mihai Răzvan Udrea
- Date of birth: 20 July 2001 (age 25)
- Place of birth: Craiova, Romania
- Height: 1.86 m (6 ft 1 in)
- Position: Goalkeeper

Team information
- Current team: FCSB
- Number: 34

Youth career
- –2018: Școala de Fotbal Gheorghe Popescu
- 2018–2020: FCSB

Senior career*
Years	Team	Apps	(Gls)
2020–	FCSB	1	(0)
2021–2022	→ Unirea Constanța (loan)	34	(0)
2023	→ Viitorul Târgu Jiu (loan)	9	(0)
- * Club domestic league appearances and goals as of 23 May 2025

Mihai Răzvan Udrea (born 20 July 2001) is a Romanian professional footballer who plays as a goalkeeper for Liga I club FCSB.

== Career statistics ==
As of 23 May 2025

Appearances and goals by club, season and competition
Club	Season	League			Cupa României		Europe		Other		Total	
Club	Season	Division	Apps	Goals	Apps	Goals	Apps	Goals	Apps	Goals	Apps	Goals
FCSB	2019–20	Liga I	0	0	1	0	—		—		1	0
FCSB	2024–25	Liga I	1	0	1	0	0	0	0	0	2	0
FCSB	2025–26	Liga I	0	0	0	0	0	0	0	0	0	0
FCSB	2026–27	Liga I	0	0	0	0	0	0	—		0	0
FCSB	Total		1	0	2	0	0	0	0	0	3	0
Unirea Constanța (loan)	2021–22	Liga II	19	0	0	0	—		—		19	0
Unirea Constanța (loan)	2022–23	Liga II	15	0	0	0	—		—		15	0
Unirea Constanța (loan)	Total		34	0	0	0	—		—		34	0
Viitorul Târgu Jiu (loan)	2022–23	Liga II	9	0	—		—		—		9	0
Career total			44	0	2	0	0	0	—		46	0

== Honours ==
FCSB

- Liga I: 2023–24, 2024–25
- Cupa României: 2019–20
- Supercupa României: 2024
