= Andrei Gheorghiță =

Romanian professional footballer

Personal information
- Full name: Andrei Cosmin Gheorghiță
- Date of birth: 16 July 2002 (age 24)
- Place of birth: Bucharest, Romania
- Height: 1.82 m (6 ft 0 in)
- Position: Winger

Team information
- Current team: Universitatea Cluj
- Number: 77

Youth career
- 2009–2012: Sportul Studențesc
- 2012–2016: Regal Sport București
- 2016: Concordia Chiajna
- 2017: Sport Team București
- 2017–2021: Academica Clinceni

Senior career*
Years	Team	Apps	(Gls)
2020–2021	Academica II Clinceni	4	(1)
2021–2022	CA Oradea	23	(3)
2022–2023	Bihor Oradea	25	(13)
2023–2025	Politehnica Iași	50	(5)
2025	→ FCSB (loan)	8	(0)
2025	FCSB	2	(0)
2025	→ Universitatea Cluj (loan)	1	(0)
2025–	Universitatea Cluj	20	(2)

International career^{‡}
2025	Romania U21	2	(0)
- * Club domestic league appearances and goals as of 7 November 2026 ‡ National team caps and goals as of 25 March 2025

Andrei Cosmin Gheorghiță (born 16 July 2002) is a Romanian professional footballer who plays as a winger for Liga I club Universitatea Cluj.

== Club career ==
Gheorghiță joined Politehnica Iași on 11 July 2023. He made his debut in Liga I against CFR Cluj on 15 July 2023.

== Career statistics ==
As of 7 November 2026

Appearances and goals by club, season and competition
Club	Season	League			Cupa României		Europe		Other		Total	
Club	Season	Division	Apps	Goals	Apps	Goals	Apps	Goals	Apps	Goals	Apps	Goals
Academica II Clinceni	2020–21	Liga III	4	1	—		—		—		4	1
CA Oradea	2021–22	Liga III	23	3	3	0	—		2 (Note: Appearances in Liga III promotion play-offs)	0	28	3
Bihor Oradea	2022–23	Liga III	25	13	0	0	—		2	0	27	13
Politehnica Iași	2023–24	Liga I	29	2	0	0	—		—		29	2
Politehnica Iași	2024–25	Liga I	21	3	2	0	—		—		23	3
Politehnica Iași	Total		50	5	2	0	—		—		52	5
FCSB (loan)	2024–25	Liga I	8	0	—		4 (Note: Appearances in UEFA Europa League)	1	—		12	1
FCSB	2025–26	Liga I	2	0	—		1 (Note: Appearance in UEFA Champions League)	0	0	0	3	0
FCSB	Total		10	0	0	0	5	1	0	0	15	1
Universitatea Cluj	2025–26	Liga I	15	2	3	0	—		—		18	2
Universitatea Cluj	2026–27	Liga I	6	0	1	0	0	0	0	0	7	0
Universitatea Cluj	Total		21	2	4	0	0	0	0	0	25	2
Career Total			133	24	9	0	5	1	4	0	151	25

== Honours ==
Bihor Oradea

- Liga III: 2022–23

FCSB

- Liga I: 2024–25
- Supercupa României: 2025

Universitatea Cluj

- Cupa României runner-up: 2025–26
- Supercupa României runner-up: 2026
