= Andrei Vlad =

Romanian footballer (born 1999)

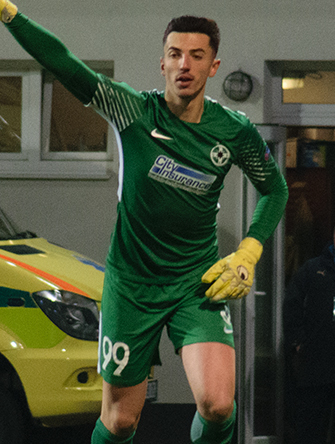
- Vlad with FCSB in 2017

Personal information
- Full name: Andrei Daniel Vlad
- Date of birth: 15 April 1999 (age 27)
- Place of birth: Târgoviște, Romania
- Height: 1.89 m (6 ft 2 in)
- Position: Goalkeeper

Youth career
- 2010–2015: CSȘ Târgoviște
- 2015–2017: Universitatea Craiova

Senior career*
Years	Team	Apps	(Gls)
2016–2017	Universitatea Craiova	1	(0)
2017–2024	FCSB	90	(0)
2025–2026	Aktobe	23	(0)
2026	Arka Gdynia	0	(0)
2026	Arka Gdynia II	1	(0)

International career
2015–2016	Romania U17	4	(0)
2016	Romania U18	2	(0)
2016–2018	Romania U19	7	(0)
2019–2021	Romania U21	12	(0)
2021	Romania	1	(0)
- * Club domestic league appearances and goals as of 22 May 2026

Andrei Daniel Vlad (Romanian pronunciation: [anˈdrej daniˈel ˈvlad]; born 15 April 1999) is a Romanian professional footballer who plays as a goalkeeper.

== Club career ==
=== Early career and Universitatea Craiova ===
Vlad practiced youth football for his hometown club CSȘ Târgoviște, before joining the academy of Universitatea Craiova in 2015. He made his professional debut for the latter on 7 May 2017, aged 18, playing the full 90 minutes in a 0–1 Liga I defeat to eventual champions Viitorul Constanța.

=== FCSB ===
On 9 July 2017, fellow Liga I team FCSB announced the signing of Vlad on a six-year contract with a €30 million buyout clause. Vlad made his FCSB debut on 9 September 2017, also a 0–1 loss to Viitorul Constanța. His first European appearance came on 23 November that year, in a 0–2 away loss to Viktoria Plzeň in the group stage of the UEFA Europa League.

On 15 February 2018, after first-choice goalkeeper Florin Niță moved to Sparta Prague, Vlad started in a 1–0 home win over Lazio in the Europa League round of 32. He then became an understudy to Cristian Bălgrădean, who was signed a few days prior to the second leg against Lazio.

Vlad started to appear frequently for the Roș-albaștrii in the 2019–20 season, amassing 26 appearances in all competitions. Following a series of unconvincing performances, he lost his starter status to Ștefan Târnovanu in March 2022.

=== Aktobe ===
He spent a single season with Aktobe in Kazakhstan.

=== Arka Gdynia ===
Vlad joined Polish top-flight club Arka Gdynia in March 2026, having been a free agent. After Arka's relegation at the end of the 2025–26 season, it was announced Vlad would leave the club upon the expiration of his contract in June.

== International career ==
Vlad made his debut for the Romania national team in a friendly against Georgia on 2 June 2021, playing the full 90 minutes in the 1–2 home loss.

== Career statistics ==
=== Club ===
As of match played 1 April 2026

Appearances and goals by club, season and competition
Club	Season	League			National cup (Note: Includes Cupa României)		Continental		Other		Total	
Club	Season	Division	Apps	Goals	Apps	Goals	Apps	Goals	Apps	Goals	Apps	Goals
Universitatea Craiova	2016–17	Liga I	1	0	0	0	—		—		1	0
FCSB	2017–18	Liga I	5	0	2	0	4 (Note: Appearances in UEFA Europa League)	0	—		11	0
FCSB	2018–19	Liga I	3	0	2	0	1	0	—		6	0
FCSB	2019–20	Liga I	16	0	4	0	6	0	—		26	0
FCSB	2020–21	Liga I	34	0	1	0	1	0	1 (Note: Appearance in Supercupa României)	0	37	0
FCSB	2021–22	Liga I	27	0	0	0	2 (Note: Appearances in UEFA Europa Conference League)	0	—		29	0
FCSB	2022–23	Liga I	3	0	2	0	0	0	—		5	0
FCSB	2023–24	Liga I	1	0	3	0	0	0	—		4	0
FCSB	2024–25	Liga I	1	0	0	0	1 (Note: Appearance in UEFA Champions League)	0	1	0	3	0
FCSB	Total		90	0	14	0	15	0	2	0	121	0
Aktobe	2025	Kazakhstan Premier League	23	0	0	0	4 (Note: Two appearances in UEFA Europa League, two appearances in UEFA Europa Conference League)	0	1 (Note: Appearance in Kazakhstan Super Cup)	0	28	0
Arka Gdynia	2025–26	Ekstraklasa	0	0	—		—		—		0	0
Arka Gdynia II	2025–26	IV liga Pomerania	1	0	—		—		—		1	0
Career total			115	0	14	0	19	0	3	0	151	0

=== International ===
Appearances and goals by national team and year
National team	Year	Apps	Goals
Romania
Romania	2021	1	0
Total		1	0

== Honours ==
FCSB

- Liga I: 2023–24, 2024–25
- Cupa României: 2019–20
- Supercupa României: 2024, runner-up: 2020

Aktobe

- Kazakhstan Super Cup runner-up: 2025

Individual

- UEFA European Under-21 Championship Team of the Tournament: 2021
