= Valentin Crețu (footballer) =

Romanian footballer (born 1989)

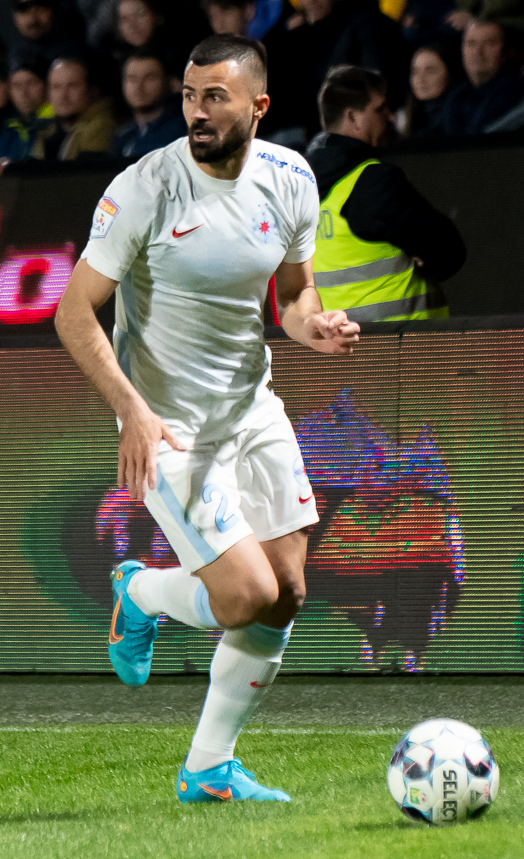
- Crețu with FCSB in 2022

Personal information
- Date of birth: 2 January 1989 (age 37)
- Place of birth: Buzău, Romania
- Height: 1.76 m (5 ft 9 in)
- Position: Right-back

Team information
- Current team: FCSB
- Number: 2

Youth career
- 2001–2007: Râmnicu Sărat
- 2007–2008: Gloria Buzău

Senior career*
Years	Team	Apps	(Gls)
2008–2009	Gloria Buzău	3	(0)
2009	→ Râmnicu Sărat (loan)	16	(0)
2009–2014	Concordia Chiajna	72	(1)
2011–2012	→ Rapid București (loan)	11	(0)
2013	→ Beroe (loan)	0	(0)
2013	→ Săgeata Năvodari (loan)	0	(0)
2014–2019	Gaz Metan Mediaș	120	(1)
2016	→ Energie Cottbus (loan)	12	(0)
2017	→ ACS Poli Timișoara (loan)	16	(0)
2019–	FCSB	196	(1)

International career^{‡}
2020	Romania	2	(0)
- * Club domestic league appearances and goals as of 22 November 2026 ‡ National team caps and goals as of 18 November 2020

Valentin Crețu (Romanian pronunciation: [valenˈtin ˈkret͡su]; born 2 January 1989) is a Romanian professional footballer who plays as a right-back for Liga I club FCSB.

== Club career ==
Crețu made his Liga I debut in the 2008–09 season in a game played for Gloria Buzău, against Steaua București which ended 1–1.

== Career statistics ==
=== Club ===
As of match played 22 November 2026

Appearances and goals by club, season and competition
Club	Season	League			National cup (Note: Includes Cupa României)		League cup (Note: Includes Cupa Ligii)		Europe		Other		Total	
Club	Season	Division	Apps	Goals	Apps	Goals	Apps	Goals	Apps	Goals	Apps	Goals	Apps	Goals
Gloria Buzău	2008–09	Liga I	2	0	1	0	—		—		—		3	0
Gloria Buzău	2009–10	Liga II	1	0	0	0	—		—		—		1	0
Gloria Buzău	Total		3	0	1	0	—		—		—		4	0
Râmnicu Sărat (loan)	2008–09	Liga III	16	0	—		—		—		—		16	0
Concordia Chiajna	2009–10	Liga II	19	0	—		—		—		—		19	0
Concordia Chiajna	2010–11	Liga II	23	0	0	0	—		—		—		23	0
Concordia Chiajna	2012–13	Liga I	14	0	1	0	—		—		—		15	0
Concordia Chiajna	2013–14	Liga I	16	1	1	0	—		—		—		17	1
Concordia Chiajna	Total		72	1	2	0	—		—		—		74	1
Rapid București (loan)	2011–12	Liga I	11	0	3	0	—		1 (Note: Appearances in UEFA Europa League)	0	—		15	0
Beroe (loan)	2012–13	A Group	0	0	—		—		—		—		0	0
Săgeata Năvodari (loan)	2012–13	Liga II	0	0	—		—		—		—		0	0
Gaz Metan Mediaș	2014–15	Liga I	26	0	1	0	1	0	—		—		28	0
Gaz Metan Mediaș	2015–16	Liga II	6	0	0	0	—		—		—		6	0
Gaz Metan Mediaș	2016–17	Liga I	36	0	2	0	0	0	—		—		38	0
Gaz Metan Mediaș	2017–18	Liga I	16	0	3	0	—		—		—		19	0
Gaz Metan Mediaș	2018–19	Liga I	33	1	1	0	—		—		—		34	1
Gaz Metan Mediaș	2019–20	Liga I	3	0	0	0	—		—		—		3	0
Gaz Metan Mediaș	Total		120	1	7	0	1	0	—		—		128	1
Energie Cottbus (loan)	2015–16	3. Liga	12	0	—		—		—		—		12	0
ACS Poli Timișoara (loan)	2017–18	Liga I	16	0	2	0	—		—		—		18	0
FCSB	2019–20	Liga I	26	0	5	0	—		4	0	—		35	0
FCSB	2020–21	Liga I	29	0	1	0	—		2	0	1 (Note: Appearance in Supercupa României)	0	33	0
FCSB	2021–22	Liga I	28	0	1	0	—		2 (Note: Appearances in UEFA Europa Conference League)	0	—		31	0
FCSB	2022–23	Liga I	17	0	1	0	—		6	0	—		24	0
FCSB	2023–24	Liga I	26	0	3	0	—		2	0	—		31	0
FCSB	2024–25	Liga I	36	1	0	0	—		17 (Note: Six appearances in UEFA Champions League, eleven appearances in UEFA Europa League)	0	0	0	53	1
FCSB	2025–26	Liga I	23	0	1	0	—		13 (Note: Four appearances in UEFA Champions League, nine appearances in UEFA Europa League)	0	2 (Note: Appearances in Liga I European play-offs)	0	39	0
FCSB	2026–27	Liga I	11	0	0	0	—		2	0	—		13	0
FCSB	Total		196	1	12	0	0	0	48	0	3	0	259	1
Career total			446	3	27	0	1	0	49	0	3	0	526	3

=== International ===
As of 18 November 2020

Appearances and goals by national team and year
National team	Year	Apps	Goals
Romania	2020	2	0
Total		2	0

== Honours ==
Râmnicu Sărat

- Liga III: 2008–09

FCSB

- Liga I: 2023–24, 2024–25
- Cupa României: 2019–20
- Supercupa României: 2024, 2025

Individual

- Liga I Team of the Season: 2024–25
