= Jordan Gele =

France footballer (born 1992)

Personal information
- Full name: Jordan Youri Gele
- Date of birth: 16 September 1992 (age 34)
- Place of birth: Houilles, France
- Height: 1.92 m (6 ft 4 in)
- Position: Forward

Team information
- Current team: Al Kharaitiyat
- Number: 11

Youth career
- Paris Saint-Germain
- INF Clairefontaine
- –2012: Racing Club de France

Senior career*
Years	Team	Apps	(Gls)
2012–2013	Boulogne B	17	(1)
2013–2014	Compiègne	11	(2)
2014–2015	Sainte-Geneviève	8	(1)
2015–2016	Mulhouse	12	(1)
2016–2017	Nantes B	18	(0)
2018	Winterthur	6	(1)
2019–2022	Rapperswil-Jona	55	(33)
2022–2023	1599 Șelimbăr	23	(6)
2023–2024	Wil	33	(2)
2024–2025	Unirea Slobozia	24	(5)
2025	FCSB	12	(1)
2025–2026	Al Kharaitiyat	7	(3)
2026–	Ratchaburi F.C.	0	(0)
- * Club domestic league appearances and goals as of 30 December 2025

Jordan Youri Gele (born 16 September 1992) is a French professional footballer who plays as a forward for Thai League 1 club Ratchaburi F.C.

== Career ==
=== Boulogne ===
Jordan Gele made his senior debut with Boulogne's reserve team during the 2012–13 season, competing in the Championnat National 3, the fifth tier of French football. He made 17 appearances and scored one goal that season.

=== Compiègne ===
He joined Compiègne in 2013 on a free transfer, playing in the French fifth division. During the 2013–14 season, he made 11 appearances and scored two goals.

=== Sainte-Geneviève ===
During the 2014–15 season, Gele played for Sainte-Geneviève in the fifth division, scoring once in eight appearances. He left the club at the end of the season on a free transfer.

=== Mulhouse ===
For the 2015–16 season, Gele played for Mulhouse in the Championnat National 2, scoring once in 12 appearances.

=== Nantes ===
For the 2016–17 season, Gele moved to Nantes B, the reserve team of Nantes, competing in the Championnat National 2. He made 18 appearances for the side.

=== Winterthur ===
After spending a season without a club, Gele joined Winterthur in the Swiss Challenge League, the second tier of Swiss football. During the 2018–19 season, he made six appearances and scored once. His only goal came in a 1–1 draw with Schaffhausen just before half-time.

=== FC Rapperswil-Jona ===
At the end of the 2018–19 season, he was released by Winterthur but quickly found a new club, signing with Rapperswil-Jona, which had just been relegated. For the 2019–20 campaign, they competed in the Swiss Promotion League, the third tier of Swiss football. He played three matches and scored three goals in the Swiss Cup as Rapperswil-Jona reached the quarter-finals. In the first round, he scored twice, including the winning goal in the 84th minute, as Rapperswil-Jona beat Muri 3–2. In the round of 16, Rapperswil-Jona won 3–2 against Bulle, with Gele scoring the winning goal in the 70th minute. He featured in the quarter-final match against Sion, which Rapperswil-Jona lost 2–1, resulting in their elimination. In the league, Gele played 16 matches and scored seven goals. Rapperswil-Jona were second in the league until the lower divisions of Switzerland were cancelled for the remainder of the season due to the COVID-19 pandemic.

==== 2020–21 season ====
During the 2020–21 season, Rapperswil-Jona did not compete in the Swiss Cup, as only 18 of the usual 45 slots were allocated to lower-division teams due to the COVID-19 pandemic.

In the Promotion League, Gele scored a 95th-minute equaliser in a 1–1 draw with Bellinzona on 15 August. On 12 September, he scored twice in a 3–2 loss to Sion U21, before scoring the third goal and providing an assist in a 5–1 win over Black Stars on 19 September. He scored a hat-trick on 26 September in a 6–1 victory against Köniz. On 3 October, he scored the third goal and provided an assist in a 5–1 win over SC YF Juventus. On 10 April 2021, he came on as a substitute in the 79th minute and scored a penalty in the 90th minute in a 3–0 win against Münsingen. On 24 April, he scored the equalising goal with a header four minutes after falling behind in a 1–1 draw with Bavois. In the play-offs, Rapperswil-Jona finished third, meaning they were unable to secure promotion. Gele scored twice in a 2–2 draw with Étoile Carouge on 21 May and scored the second goal in a 3–0 win over SC Cham on 22 May. He finished the 2020–21 season as the second-highest goalscorer in the Swiss Promotion League.

==== 2021–22 season ====
He scored a penalty on 23 October in a 1–1 draw with Étoile Carouge. On 27 November, Gele scored twice in a 5–3 loss to BSC Young Boys’ reserve team. On 4 December, he scored two goals in a 2–1 win over SC Brühl, including a left-footed shot. He converted a penalty against FC Chiasso on 20 February in a 2–2 draw. On 26 February, he scored the third goal in a 3–0 win over SC YF Juventus. He scored a penalty in the 90th minute to draw 1–1 with SC Cham on 12 March. He also scored a left-footed goal in a 3–1 win over Basel’s reserve team on 19 March. During the 2021–22 season, Gele made 19 appearances and scored nine goals in the Promotion League regular season. In the play-off round, he scored four goals in five matches, including two in a 3–3 draw with Young Boys’ reserve team, one against Basel’s reserves in a 6–4 loss, and one in a 3–2 win over FC Biel.

=== 1599 Șelimbăr ===
Gele signed for CSC 1599 Șelimbăr in 2022, competing in Liga II, the second tier of Romanian football. He scored six goals in 23 matches for Șelimbăr, having failed to score in the first half of the season. His first goal came on 25 February in a 4–1 loss to FC Politehnica Iași. He scored again in added time during a 2–1 loss to Dinamo București on 4 March. On 18 March, he scored a goal in a 3–2 win over Unirea Slobozia. He found the net in a 2–0 win against CSM Slatina on 8 April. On 23 April, Gele scored in a 2–1 loss to Metaloglobus București. His final goal for Șelimbăr came on 29 April in a 1–0 win against Minaur Baia Mare. Despite Șelimbăr’s attempts to extend his contract, Gele signed with FC Wil.

=== FC Wil ===
Gele joined FC Wil in the Swiss Challenge League, the second tier of Swiss football, in 2023. He spent one season with the club, scoring two goals, before moving to Unirea Slobozia.

=== Unirea Slobozia ===
In 2024, Gele joined Unirea Slobozia, who had just been promoted to Liga I, the top tier of Romanian football. He made 24 league appearances for the club, scoring five goals, before leaving to join FCSB in February.

=== FCSB ===
On 10 February 2025, FCSB paid €300,000 to sign Gele from fellow Liga I side Unirea Slobozia. He signed a contract running until the summer of 2026.

=== Al Kharaitiyat ===
On 15 August 2025, Gele signed with Al Kharaitiyat SC in the Qatari Second Division. He made his debut in a 0–0 draw against Al Bidda SC on 19 August. On 1 September, he scored twice in a 5–1 win over Lusail SC in the Qatari Stars Cup.

=== Ratchaburi F.C. ===
On July 22,2026 Gele signed with Thai League 1 club Ratchaburi F.C. for 1-year deal.

== Career statistics ==
As of match played 10 January 2026

Appearances and goals by club, season and competition
Club	Season	League			National cup (Note: Includes Coupe de France, Swiss Cup, Cupa României, Amir Cup)		Continental		Other		Total	
Club	Season	Division	Apps	Goals	Apps	Goals	Apps	Goals	Apps	Goals	Apps	Goals
Boulogne B	2012–13	Championnat National 3	17	1	—		—		—		17	1
Compiègne	2013–14	Championnat National 3	11	2	—		—		—		11	2
Sainte-Geneviève	2014–15	Championnat National 3	8	1	—		—		—		8	1
Mulhouse	2015–16	Championnat National 2	12	1	1	0	—		—		13	1
Nantes B	2016–17	Championnat National 2	18	0	—		—		—		18	0
Winterthur	2018–19	Challenge League	6	1	—		—		—		6	1
Rapperswil-Jona	2019–20	Promotion League	16	7	3	3	—		—		19	10
Rapperswil-Jona	2020–21	Promotion League	15	13	—		—		—		15	13
Rapperswil-Jona	2021–22	Promotion League	24	13	—		—		—		24	13
Rapperswil-Jona	Total		55	33	3	3	—		—		58	36
Șelimbăr	2022–23	Liga II	23	6	2	1	—		—		25	7
Wil	2023–24	Challenge League	33	2	2	1	—		—		35	3
Unirea Slobozia	2024–25	Liga I	24	5	—		—		—		24	5
FCSB	2024–25	Liga I	12	1	—		—		—		12	1
Al Kharaitiyat	2025–26	Qatari Second Division	7	3	1	1	—		9 (Note: Appearances in Qatari Stars Cup)	6	17	10
Career total			226	56	9	6	—		9	6	244	68

== Honours ==
FCSB

- Liga I: 2024–25
