= 2024–25 Liga I =

Liga I
- Season: 2024–25
- Dates: 12 July 2024 – 24 May 2025
- Champions: FCSB (28th title)
- Relegated: Gloria Buzău; Sepsi OSK; Politehnica Iași
- Champions League: FCSB
- Europa League: CFR Cluj
- Conference League: Universitatea Craiova; Universitatea Cluj
- Matches: 315
- Goals: 733 (2.33 per match)
- Top goalscorer: Louis Munteanu (23 goals)
- Biggest home win: CFR Cluj 6–0 Gloria Buzău (9 March 2025)
- Biggest away win: UTA Arad 1–4 CFR Cluj (11 February 2025); Sepsi OSK 0–3 Oțelul Galați (25 April 2025)
- Highest scoring: Universitatea Craiova; 5–1 Gloria Buzău (17 August 2024); CFR Cluj 6–0 Gloria Buzău (9 March 2025)
- Longest winning run: CFR Cluj (6 matches)
- Longest unbeaten run: FCSB (24 matches)
- Longest winless run: Sepsi OSK (9 matches)
- Longest losing run: Gloria Buzău (5 matches)

The 2024–25 Liga I (also known as Superliga for sponsorship reasons) was the 107th season of Liga I, the top football league in Romania. The season started on 12 July 2024. The newcomers were Unirea Slobozia, who made their debut in Liga I, and Gloria Buzău, who returned to Liga I after a 15-year absence. The draw took place on 1 July 2024.

== Teams ==
=== Promotion and relegation (pre-season) ===
The league consists of 16 teams: 14 teams from 2023–24 Liga I and two teams promoted from 2023–24 Liga II.

==== Teams promoted from the Liga II ====
The first club to be promoted was Unirea Slobozia, they made their debut in Liga 1.

The second club to be promoted was Gloria Buzău, they returned to Liga I after fifteen years of absence.

==== Teams relegated to the Liga II ====
The first club to be relegated was FCU 1948 Craiova, ending their three-year stay in the top flight.

The second club to be relegated was Voluntari, ending their nine-year stay in the top flight.

=== Stadiums and locations ===
FCSB	Universitatea Craiova	Universitatea Cluj	CFR Cluj
Arena Națională	Ion Oblemenco Stadium	Cluj Arena	Dr. Constantin Rădulescu Stadium
Capacity: 55,634	Capacity: 30,983	Capacity: 30,201	Capacity: 22,198
Petrolul Ploiești	Rapid București	Oțelul Galați	Hermannstadt
Ilie Oană Stadium	Rapid–Giulești Stadium	Oțelul Stadium	Sibiu Municipal Stadium
Capacity: 15,073	Capacity: 14,047	Capacity: 13,500	Capacity: 12,363
Gloria Buzău	2024–25 Liga I (Romania) Location of Bucharest / Ilfov County teams.		UTA Arad
Buzău Municipal Stadium	2024–25 Liga I (Romania) Location of Bucharest / Ilfov County teams.		Francisc von Neuman
Capacity: 12,321	2024–25 Liga I (Romania) Location of Bucharest / Ilfov County teams.		Capacity: 11,500
Politehnica Iași	2024–25 Liga I (Romania) Location of Bucharest / Ilfov County teams.		Sepsi OSK
Emil Alexandrescu Stadium	2024–25 Liga I (Romania) Location of Bucharest / Ilfov County teams.		Sepsi Arena
Capacity: 11,390	2024–25 Liga I (Romania) Location of Bucharest / Ilfov County teams.		Capacity: 8,400
Dinamo București	Botoșani	Unirea Slobozia	Farul Constanța
Arcul de Triumf Stadium	Botosani Municipal Stadium	Clinceni Stadium (Note: Unirea Slobozia is currently relocated to Clinceni Stadium in Clinceni because Stadionul 1 Mai in Slobozia is under renovations.)	Central Stadium
Capacity: 8,207	Capacity: 7,782	Capacity: 4,502	Capacity: 4,554

=== Personnel and sponsorship ===
Note: Flags indicate national team as has been defined under FIFA eligibility rules. Players and Managers may hold more than one non-FIFA nationality.

Team	Manager	Captain	Kit manufacturer	Main Shirt sponsor	Other Shirt sponsor
Botoșani	(Romania) Leontin Grozavu	(Romania) Andrei Miron	Adidas	Unibet	Elsaco, Electroalfa
CFR Cluj	(Romania) Dan Petrescu	(Romania) Camora	Nike	Player	MyPlace Residence, Aquavita
Dinamo București	(Croatia) Željko Kopić	(Romania) Răzvan Patriche	Macron	Superbet	Renovatio
Farul Constanța	(Romania) Gheorghe Hagi (owner and manager)	(Romania) Ionuț Larie	Nike	Superbet	Auchan
FCSB	(Cyprus) Elias Charalambous	(Romania) Darius Olaru	Nike	Betano	Walter Tosto, MG
Hermannstadt	(Romania) Marius Măldărășanu	(Romania) Ionuț Stoica	Nike	Unibet	Sibiu Municipality, Escudo
Gloria Buzău	(Romania) Ilie Stan	(Romania) David Lazar	Joma	Getica 95	Hai Buzău!, Favbet
Oțelul Galați	(Romania) László Balint	(Romania) Ionuț Neagu	Adidas	Liberty	Mr Bit
Petrolul Ploiești	(Turkey) Mehmet Topal	(Romania) Gheorghe Grozav	Macron	Mr Bit	La Cocoș
Politehnica Iași	(Hungary) Vasile Miriuță	(Romania) Mihai Bordeianu	Nike	Maxbet	Iași Municipality
Rapid București	(Romania) Octavian Chihaia (caretaker)	(Romania) Cristian Săpunaru	Kappa	Superbet	IMAMED
Sepsi OSK	(Romania) Csaba László (caretaker)	(Romania) Florin Ștefan	Adidas	Diószegi	Gyermelyi
Unirea Slobozia	(Romania) Adrian Mihalcea	(Romania) Constantin Toma	Adidas	Mr Bit	Andisol, Terra Oyl Group, Taboo Events, Ialomița
Universitatea Cluj	(Romania) Ioan Sabău	(Romania) Alexandru Chipciu	Adidas	Superbet	AROBS
Universitatea Craiova	(Romania) Mirel Rădoi	(Romania) Nicușor Bancu	Puma	Betano	
UTA Arad	(Romania) Mircea Rednic	(Romania) Alexandru Benga	Saller	Favbet	

=== Managerial changes ===
Team	Outgoing manager	Manner of departure	Date of vacancy	Position in table	Incoming manager	Date of appointment
Rapid București	(Romania) Bogdan Lobonț (caretaker)	End of contract	30 June 2024	Pre-season	(Northern Ireland) Neil Lennon	1 July 2024
Petrolul Ploiești	(Romania) László Balint	Sacked	30 June 2024	Pre-season	(Turkey) Mehmet Topal	1 July 2024
Botoșani	(Romania) Bogdan Andone	Sacked	25 July 2024	16th	(Romania) Liviu Ciobotariu	25 July 2024
Rapid București	(Northern Ireland) Neil Lennon	Sacked	20 August 2024	12th	(Romania) Marius Șumudică	20 August 2024
Gloria Buzău	(Romania) Andrei Prepeliță	Mutual Agreement	4 September 2024	16th	(Romania) Eugen Neagoe	5 September 2024
Politehnica Iași	(Portugal) Anthony da Silva	Resigned	4 September 2024	14th	(Romania) Emil Săndoi	11 September 2024
Sepsi OSK	(Germany) Bernd Storck	Sacked	5 September 2024	12th	(Romania) Valentin Suciu (caretaker)	10 September 2024
Petrolul Ploiești	(Turkey) Mehmet Topal	Resigned	24 December 2024	6th	(Romania) Adrian Mutu	31 December 2024
Oțelul Galați	(Romania) Dorinel Munteanu	Resigned	30 December 2024	11th	(Romania) Ovidiu Burcă	1 January 2025
Botoșani	(Romania) Liviu Ciobotariu	Sacked	6 January 2025	15th	(Romania) Leontin Grozavu	6 January 2025
Politehnica Iași	(Romania) Emil Săndoi	Sacked	27 January 2025	14th	(Hungary) Vasile Miriuță	28 January 2025
Universitatea Craiova	(Romania) Constantin Gâlcă	Sacked	28 January 2025	5th	(Romania) Mirel Rădoi	28 January 2025
Gloria Buzău	(Romania) Eugen Neagoe	Mutual Agreement	10 March 2025	16th	(Romania) Ilie Stan	12 March 2025
Petrolul Ploiești	(Romania) Adrian Mutu	Mutual Agreement	17 March 2025	9th	(Turkey) Mehmet Topal	18 March 2025
Sepsi OSK	(Romania) Valentin Suciu (caretaker)	Demoted	18 March 2025	8th	(Romania) Dorinel Munteanu	18 March 2025
Oțelul Galați	(Romania) Ovidiu Burcă	Sacked	19 March 2025	14th	(Romania) László Balint	19 March 2025
Sepsi OSK	(Romania) Dorinel Munteanu	Mutual Agreement	28 April 2025	14th	(Romania) Csaba László (caretaker)	29 April 2025
Rapid București	(Romania) Marius Șumudică	Resigned	20 May 2025	5th	(Romania) Octavian Chihaia (caretaker)	21 May 2025

== Regular season ==
=== League table ===
Pos	Team	Pld	W	D	L	GF	GA	GD	Pts	Advances
1	FCSB	30	15	11	4	43	24	+19	56	Qualification for play-off round
2	CFR Cluj	30	14	12	4	56	32	+24	54	Qualification for play-off round
3	Universitatea Craiova	30	14	10	6	45	28	+17	52 (Note: Ranked on head-to-head points: Universitatea Craiova (4); Universitatea Cluj (1).)	Qualification for play-off round
4	Universitatea Cluj	30	14	10	6	43	27	+16	52	Qualification for play-off round
5	Dinamo București	30	13	12	5	41	26	+15	51	Qualification for play-off round
6	Rapid București	30	11	13	6	35	26	+9	46	Qualification for play-off round
7	Sepsi OSK	30	11	8	11	38	35	+3	41 (Note: Ranked on head-to-head goal difference: Sepsi (+3); Hermannstadt (-3).)	Qualification for play-out round
8	Hermannstadt	30	11	8	11	34	40	−6	41	Qualification for play-out round
9	Petrolul Ploiești	30	9	13	8	29	29	0	40	Qualification for play-out round
10	Farul Constanța	30	8	11	11	29	38	−9	35	Qualification for play-out round
11	UTA Arad	30	8	10	12	28	35	−7	34	Qualification for play-out round
12	Oțelul Galați	30	7	11	12	24	32	−8	32	Qualification for play-out round
13	Politehnica Iași	30	8	7	15	29	46	−17	31 (Note: Ranked on head-to-head points: Politehnica Iași (4); Botoșani (1).)	Qualification for play-out round
14	Botoșani	30	7	10	13	26	37	−11	31	Qualification for play-out round
15	Unirea Slobozia	30	7	5	18	28	47	−19	26	Qualification for play-out round
16	Gloria Buzău	30	5	5	20	25	51	−26	20	Qualification for play-out round

Source: LPF (in Romanian)
Rules for classification: 1) Points; 2) Head-to-head points; 3) Head-to-head goal difference; 4) Head-to-head goals scored; 5) Goal difference; 6) Goals scored; 7) Play-off.
Notes:

Pos.	Team	Pld	W	D	L	GF	GA	GD	Pts
1	FCSB	30	15	11	4	43	24	+19	56
2	CFR Cluj	30	14	12	4	56	32	+24	54
3	Universitatea Craiova	30	14	10	6	45	28	+17	52
4	Universitatea Cluj	30	14	10	6	43	27	+16	52
5	Dinamo București	30	13	12	5	41	26	+15	51
6	Rapid București	30	11	13	6	35	26	+9	46
7	Sepsi OSK	30	11	8	11	38	35	+3	41
8	Hermannstadt	30	11	8	11	34	40	−6	41
9	Petrolul Ploiești	30	9	13	8	29	29	0	40
10	Farul Constanța	30	8	11	11	29	38	−9	35
11	UTA Arad	30	8	10	12	28	35	−7	34
12	Oțelul Galați	30	7	11	12	24	32	−8	32
13	Politehnica Iași	30	8	7	15	29	46	−17	31
14	Botoșani	30	7	10	13	26	37	−11	31
15	Unirea Slobozia	30	7	5	18	28	47	−19	26
16	Gloria Buzău	30	5	5	20	25	51	−26	20

=== Results ===
Home \ Away	BOT	CFR	DIN	FAR	FCS	GLO	HER	IAS	OTE	PET	RAP	SPS	UCJ	UCV	UNS	UTA
Botoșani		1–1	1–1	0–0	1–0	3–3	1–2	1–1	2–3	0–2	2–0	0–0	1–2	2–2	1–0	1–0
CFR Cluj	3–0		3–2	3–1	2–2	6–0	1–0	2–1	3–2	2–0	1–1	3–3	2–3	0–2	3–0	1–3
Dinamo București	2–2	1–1		0–2	0–2	4–1	2–0	2–0	1–0	4–1	0–0	1–1	0–0	2–1	1–0	1–0
Farul Constanța	0–1	0–3	1–1		1–1	1–0	3–2	2–0	0–1	2–1	1–3	2–1	1–1	3–2	0–1	1–1
FCSB	2–1	1–1	2–1	3–2		3–2	1–1	0–1	0–2	1–1	0–0	3–0	1–1	1–0	3–0	2–0
Gloria Buzău	0–2	0–1	0–1	1–0	0–2		3–0	2–0	0–0	0–1	1–1	1–2	0–2	0–2	3–0	1–1
Hermannstadt	2–1	0–0	0–2	0–0	2–0	2–1		6–2	1–0	1–1	1–0	0–4	2–1	0–0	1–1	0–0
Politehnica Iași	1–0	1–1	2–2	2–2	0–2	1–2	0–2		2–1	1–0	1–2	1–2	1–0	2–0	1–0	0–1
Oțelul Galați	0–0	0–1	1–1	0–0	1–4	2–1	1–0	2–3		0–0	1–1	2–0	0–1	1–1	0–2	1–1
Petrolul Ploiești	3–1	0–0	0–1	1–1	0–0	0–0	4–1	3–1	0–0		1–0	1–0	0–0	1–1	2–1	0–1
Rapid București	1–0	2–2	1–1	5–0	0–0	2–0	1–0	2–1	0–0	1–1		2–2	0–2	1–0	2–1	2–0
Sepsi OSK	3–0	1–1	1–1	1–0	0–1	2–0	2–3	1–0	2–0	1–1	2–0		0–0	1–2	0–1	1–0
Universitatea Cluj	0–1	3–2	1–0	1–1	1–2	2–1	3–1	2–2	2–0	4–1	2–1	3–0		1–1	3–2	0–1
Universitatea Craiova	0–0	0–2	1–1	1–0	1–1	5–1	3–1	4–1	2–1	0–0	1–1	2–1	1–0		3–0	4–2
Unirea Slobozia	1–0	1–1	1–3	0–1	2–2	2–1	1–2	0–0	0–1	1–2	1–2	3–2	2–2	0–1		0–1
UTA Arad	2–0	1–4	0–2	1–1	0–1	1–0	1–1	0–0	1–1	3–1	1–1	1–2	0–0	1–2	3–4	

Source: LPF (in Romanian)
Legend: Blue = home team win; Yellow = draw; Red = away team win.

=== Positions by round ===
Team ╲ Round	1	2	3	4	5	6	7	8	9	10	11	12	13	14	15	16	17	18	19	20	21	22	23	24	25	26	27	28	29	30
FCSB	7	10	13	15	9	13	15	10	11	6	6	6	6	6	6	6	6	2	2	3	2	2	2	2	4	2	1	1	1	1
CFR Cluj	2	4	8	10	6	7	5	4	5	5	5	5	5	3	2	2	2	1	4	5	5	5	3	4	3	1	4	3	3	2
Universitatea Craiova	10	3	1	2	1	1	2	2	4	4	4	4	4	5	5	5	5	5	5	4	4	4	5	5	5	3	2	4	2	3
Universitatea Cluj	6	2	4	3	3	2	1	1	1	1	1	1	1	1	1	1	1	3	1	1	1	1	1	1	1	4	3	2	4	4
Dinamo București	13	7	6	5	4	4	3	6	3	3	3	3	3	2	4	4	4	4	3	2	3	3	4	3	2	5	5	5	5	5
Rapid București	5	9	12	12	13	12	7	9	12	10	10	10	10	12	7	7	7	8	8	7	8	6	6	6	6	6	6	6	6	6
Sepsi OSK	4	1	3	4	5	6	10	12	8	8	8	8	8	9	10	8	8	7	6	6	7	8	8	8	7	7	7	7	7	7
Hermannstadt	11	14	15	16	10	14	9	7	7	15	15	15	15	15	15	16	15	13	12	9	9	9	9	9	9	9	9	8	8	8
Petrolul Ploiești	12	15	9	8	8	5	6	5	6	2	2	2	2	4	3	3	3	6	7	8	6	7	7	7	8	8	8	9	9	9
Farul Constanța	16	12	16	9	14	8	8	11	13	13	13	13	13	13	13	11	11	11	10	11	12	12	12	11	12	10	10	10	11	10
UTA Arad	8	13	14	7	7	11	12	13	14	9	9	9	9	10	11	12	12	10	13	12	10	10	10	12	10	11	11	11	10	11
Oțelul Galați	1	6	2	1	2	3	4	3	2	7	7	7	7	8	9	10	10	9	9	10	11	11	11	10	11	12	12	12	12	12
Botoșani	14	16	10	13	16	10	14	15	15	16	16	16	16	16	16	14	14	15	15	15	15	15	16	15	14	14	14	14	13	13
Politehnica Iași	15	8	11	14	15	9	13	14	10	11	11	11	11	11	8	9	9	12	11	14	14	14	14	14	15	15	15	15	14	14
Unirea Slobozia	3	5	5	6	12	15	11	8	9	12	12	12	12	11	12	13	13	14	14	13	13	13	13	13	13	13	13	13	15	15
Gloria Buzău	9	11	7	11	11	16	16	16	16	14	14	14	14	14	14	15	16	16	16	16	16	16	15	16	16	16	16	16	16	16

Leader and Qualification for the Play-off round
Qualification for the Play-off round
Qualification for the Play-out round

Source: LPF (in Romanian)

== Play-off round ==
The top six teams from Regular season will meet twice (10 matches per team) for places in 2025–26 UEFA Champions League and 2025–26 UEFA Conference League as well as deciding the league champion. Teams start the Championship round with their points from the Regular season halved, rounded upwards, and no other records carried over from the Regular season.

=== Play-off table ===
Pos	Team	Pld	W	D	L	GF	GA	GD	Pts	Qualification	FCS	CFR	UCV	UCJ	RAP	DIN
1	FCSB (C)	10	7	3	0	18	9	+9	52	Qualification for Champions League first qualifying round		3–2	1–0	1–0	3–3	3–1
2	CFR Cluj	10	4	4	2	17	11	+6	43	Qualification for Europa League first qualifying round (Note: The winner of the 2024–25 Cupa României (CFR Cluj) qualifies for the Europa League first qualifying round.)	1–1		2–0	1–0	1–1	3–1
3	Universitatea Craiova	10	4	2	4	13	11	+2	40	Qualification for Conference League second qualifying round	0–0	2–2		3–0	1–2	2–1
4	Universitatea Cluj	10	4	1	5	12	15	−3	39	Qualification for Conference League second qualifying round	0–2	1–0	2–1		2–2	2–4
5	Rapid București	10	2	4	4	12	17	−5	33		1–2	1–4	1–2	0–2		1–0
6	Dinamo București	10	1	2	7	10	19	−9	31		1–2	1–1	0–2	1–3	0–0	

Source: Soccerway, FRF (in Romanian), LPF (in Romanian)
Legend: Blue = home team win; Yellow = draw; Red = away team win.
Rules for classification: 1) Points; 2) Points without rounding; 3) Points in the regular season; 4) Head-to-head points; 5) Head-to-head goal difference; 6) Head-to-head goals scored; 7) Goal difference; 8) Goals scored; 9) Play-off (only if needed to decide champion or teams for UEFA competitions). (Note: only criteria 7 and 8 are applied to establish the classification during the competition.) Source:
(C) Champions

== Play-out round ==
The bottom ten teams from the regular season meet once to contest against relegation. Teams started the play-out round with their points from the Regular season halved, rounded upwards, and no other records carried over from the Regular season. The winner of the Relegation round finish 7th in the overall season standings, the second placed team – 8th, and so on, with the last placed team in the Relegation round being 16th.

=== Play-out table ===
Pos	Team	Pld	W	D	L	GF	GA	GD	Pts	Qualification or relegation	HER	OTE	PET	UTA	FAR	BOT	IAS	UNS	SPS	GLO
7	Hermannstadt	9	4	3	2	12	8	+4	36				1–1	3–0			1–0	1–1		0–2
8	Oțelul Galați	9	6	1	2	13	5	+8	35		1–2				0–0		1–0	2–0		
9	Petrolul Ploiești	9	3	2	4	10	10	0	31			1–3			0–1	0–2			2–1	4–0
10	UTA Arad	9	4	2	3	9	11	−2	31			2–0	2–0			1–0	0–4		1–1	0–0
11	Farul Constanța	9	3	4	2	12	9	+3	31		1–1			1–2			0–0	1–1		1–0
12	Botoșani	9	4	1	4	11	12	−1	29		2–1	0–1			4–3			1–1		
13	Politehnica Iași (R)	9	3	3	3	9	5	+4	28	Qualification for relegation play-offs			0–2	4–0		3–0			0–0	
14	Unirea Slobozia (O)	9	3	5	1	11	8	+3	27	Qualification for relegation play-offs			0–0	2–1			1–1		2–1	
15	Sepsi OSK (R)	9	1	2	6	7	16	−9	26	Relegation to 2025–26 Liga II	0–2	0–3			1–4	2–0				1–2
16	Gloria Buzău (R)	9	2	1	6	4	14	−10	17	Dissolved		0–2				0–2	0–1	0–3		

Source: Soccerway, FRF (in Romanian), LPF (in Romanian)
Legend: Blue = home team win; Yellow = draw; Red = away team win.
Rules for classification: 1) Points; 2) Points without rounding; 3) Points in the regular season; 4) Head-to-head points; 5) Head-to-head goal difference; 6) Head-to-head goals scored; 7) Goal difference; 8) Goals scored; 9) Play-off (only if needed to decide teams for relegation). (Note: only criteria 7 and 8 are applied to establish the classification during the competition.) Source:
(O) Play-off winners; (R) Relegated

== Promotion/relegation play-offs ==
The 13th and 14th-placed teams of the Liga I faces the 3rd and 4th-placed team of the Liga II.

Team 1	Agg.	Team 2	1st leg	2nd leg
Politehnica Iași	1–2	Metaloglobus București	1–1	0–1
Voluntari	2–2 (3–4 p)	Unirea Slobozia	2–1	0–1

First leg

25 May 2025	Politehnica Iași	1–1	Metaloglobus București	Iași
15:00 EEST (UTC+3)	Ștefanovici 12'	Report	Huiban 86'	Stadium: Emil Alexandrescu; Attendance: 2,332; Referee: István Kovács

26 May 2025	Voluntari	2–1	Unirea Slobozia	Voluntari
20:00 EEST (UTC+3)	Andreș 21'; Schieb 86'	Report	Vojtuš 32'	Stadium: Anghel Iordănescu; Attendance: 500; Referee: Marian Barbu

Second leg

1 June 2025	Metaloglobus București	1–0	Politehnica Iași	Clinceni
21:00 EEST (UTC+3)	Huiban 85'	Report		Stadium: Clinceni Stadium; Attendance: 500; Referee: Adrian Cojocaru

2 June 2025	Unirea Slobozia	1–0 (4–3 p)	Voluntari	Clinceni
20:00 EEST (UTC+3)	Arabuli 41'	Report		Stadium: Clinceni Stadium; Attendance: 2,401; Referee: Horațiu Feșnic
	Penalties
	Vojtuš (penalty missed); Arabuli (penalty scored); Perianu (penalty scored); Bărbuț (penalty scored); Toma (penalty scored)		Dumiter (penalty scored); Panțîru (penalty missed); Carnat (penalty missed); Crișan (penalty scored); Guțea (penalty scored)

== Season statistics ==
=== Top scorers ===
As of 24 May 2025

Rank	Player	Club	Goals
1	(Romania) Louis Munteanu	CFR Cluj	23
2	(Romania) Alexandru Mitriță	Universitatea Craiova	19
3	(Romania) Daniel Bîrligea	FCSB / CFR Cluj	16
4	(Kosovo) Astrit Selmani	Dinamo București	14
5	(Romania) Ianis Stoica	Hermannstadt	13
6	(Romania) Vladislav Blănuță	Universitatea Cluj	12
7	(Romania) Ștefan Baiaram	Universitatea Craiova	11
7	(Romania) Dan Nistor	Universitatea Cluj	11
9	(Romania) Gheorghe Grozav	Petrolul Ploiești	10
10	(Romania) Denis Alibec	Farul Constanta	9
10	(Senegal) Mamadou Thiam	Universitatea Cluj	9
10	(Kosovo) Meriton Korenica	CFR Cluj	9

=== Clean sheets ===
As of 19 May 2025

Rank	Player	Club	Clean sheets
1	(Romania) Ștefan Târnovanu	FCSB	16
2	(Spain) Jesús Fernández	Politehnica Iași	13
3	(Romania) Laurențiu Popescu	Universitatea Craiova	12
4	(Lithuania) Edvinas Gertmonas	Universitatea Cluj	11
4	(Greece) Giannis Anestis	Botoșani	11
4	(Romania) Alexandru Buzbuchi	Farul Constanța	11
7	(Romania) Iustin Popescu	Oțelul Galați	10
7	(Romania) Cătălin Căbuz	Hermannstadt	10
9	(Romania) Alexandru Roșca	Dinamo București	9
10	(Czech Republic) Lukáš Zima	Petrolul Ploiești	8
10	(Romania) Otto Hindrich	CFR Cluj	8
10	(North Macedonia) Dejan Iliev	UTA Arad	8

== Champion squad ==
FCSB

Goalkeepers: Ștefan Târnovanu (38 / 0); Mihai Udrea (1 / 0); Andrei Vlad (1 / 0); Lukáš Zima (Czech Republic) (1 / 0)
Defenders: Nana Antwi (Ghana) (4 / 0); Ionuț Cercel (3 / 0); Valentin Crețu (36 / 1); Andrei Dăncuș (1 / 0); Joyskim Dawa (Cameroon) (27 / 1); Denis Haruț (1 / 0); David Kiki (Benin) (5 / 0); Siyabonga Ngezana (South Africa) (23 / 1); Mihai Popescu (25 / 0); Alexandru Pantea (8 / 0); Ionuț Panțîru (8 / 0); Risto Radunović (Montenegro) (31 / 1); Matei Manolache (1 / 0)
Midfielders: Baba Alhassan (Uganda) (29 / 2); William Baeten (Belgium) (9 / 0); Alexandru Băluță (26 / 3); Vlad Chiricheș (25 / 1); Luca Ciobanu (1 / 0); Juri Cisotti (Italy) (16 / 4); Malcom Edjouma (France) (24 / 0); Andrei Gheorghiță (8 / 0); Mihai Lixandru (13 / 1); Alexandru Musi (21 / 3); Darius Olaru (17 / 8); Andrei Pandele (1 / 0); Marius Ștefănescu (26 / 3); Adrian Șut (30 / 1); Mihai Toma (15 / 0)
Forwards: Daniel Bîrligea (24 / 14); Jordan Gele (France) (12 / 1); David Miculescu (37 / 6); Luis Phelipe (Brazil) (7 / 0); Daniel Popa (15 / 0); Octavian Popescu (18 / 4); Alexandru Stoian (2 / 1); Florin Tănase (28 / 4)
(league appearances and goals listed in brackets)

Manager: Elias Charalambous (Cyprus)

== Awards ==
Award	Winner	Club
Manager of the Season	(Cyprus) Elias Charalambous	FCSB

Team of the Season
Goalkeeper	(Romania) Ștefan Târnovanu (FCSB)			
Defence	(Romania) Valentin Crețu (FCSB)	(South Africa) Siyabonga Ngezana (FCSB)	(Argentina) Lucas Masoero (Universitatea Cluj)	(Montenegro) Risto Radunović (FCSB)
Midfield	(Romania) Ștefan Baiaram (Universitatea Craiova)	(Kosovo) Meriton Korenica (CFR Cluj)	(Romania) Adrian Șut (FCSB)	(Romania) Alexandru Mitriță (Universitatea Craiova)
Attack	(Romania) Daniel Bîrligea (CFR Cluj/FCSB)		(Romania) Louis Munteanu (CFR Cluj)	

== Attendances ==
=== Overall ===
As of 24 May 2025

Pos	Team	Total	High	Low	Average	Change
1	FCSB	313,140	53,135		15,657	n/a
2	Universitatea Cluj	224,160	25,722		11,208	n/a
3	Rapid București	222,900	30,823		11,145	n/a
4	Universitatea Craiova	220,180	28,012		11,009	n/a
5	Dinamo București	218,900	45,469		10,945	n/a
6	UTA Arad	130,587	10,374		6,873	n/a
7	Petrolul Ploiești	107,065	9,700		5,635	n/a
8	Oțelul Galați	103,800	9,678		5,190	n/a
9	CFR Cluj	103,240	11,252		5,162	n/a
10	Politehnica Iași	80,864	9,122		4,256	n/a
11	Hermannstadt	76,114	8,000		4,006	n/a
12	Botoșani	62,852	6,102		3,308	n/a
13	Sepsi OSK	60,401	6,550		3,179	n/a
14	Farul Constanța	51,946	4,080		2,734	n/a
15	Gloria Buzău	46,930	7,623		2,470	n/a^{†}
16	Unirea Slobozia	17,138	3,500		902	n/a^{†}
	League total	2,040,217	53,135		6,532	n/a

Source: European Football Statistics
Notes:
^{†} Teams played the previous season in Liga II.
