= Andrei Cristea-David =

Romanian footballer

Personal information
- Date of birth: 9 January 2000 (age 26)
- Place of birth: Bucharest, Romania
- Height: 1.82 m (6 ft 0 in)
- Position: Goalkeeper

Youth career
- Regal Sport București

Senior career*
Years	Team	Apps	(Gls)
2018–2021	Gaz Metan Mediaș	1	(0)

International career^{‡}
2016–2017	Romania U17	3	(0)
2018–2019	Romania U19	2	(0)
- * Club domestic league appearances and goals as of 14:07, 14 June 2021 (UTC) ‡ National team caps and goals as of 19 January 2019

Andrei Cristea-David (born 9 January 2000) is a Romanian retired professional footballer who plays as a goalkeeper. In 2016 he signed with Gaz Metan, but he played mainly for the second team of the club, in the Liga III. On 15 December 2018 he made his Liga I debut, in a match between Gaz Metan Mediaș and FC Hermannstadt (known as Sibiu Derby), ended with the score of 0–2. In the summer of 2021 he retired due to multiple injuries.

== International career ==
Andrei Cristea-David played at international level for Romania U17 and U19 teams.
