= Gloria Bistrița =

Gloria Bistrița may refer to:

- CS Gloria Bistrița (football), a football club in Bistrița, Romania, founded in 2018
- CS Gloria Bistrița (handball), a women's handball club in Bistrița, Romania, founded in 2009
- ACF Gloria Bistrița, a 1922–2015 football club in Bistrița, Romania
