= Cociuba Mare =

- Commune
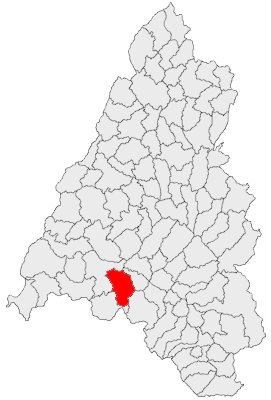
- Location in Bihor County

- Location in Romania
- Coordinates: 46°44′N 22°0′E
- Country: Romania
- County: Bihor
- Population (2021-12-01): 2,724
- Time zone: EET/EEST (UTC+2/+3)
- Vehicle reg.: BH

Cociuba Mare (Hungarian: Alsókocsoba) is a commune in Bihor County, Crișana, Romania with a population of 2,798 people. It is composed of four villages: Cărăsău (Karaszó), Cheșa (Kisháza), Cociuba Mare and Petid (Petegd).

== Location ==
Cociuba Mare is situated in the southern part of the county Bihor. It is 600 km from Bucharest and 50 km from Oradea. It is bordered to the north-west by the commune Tinca, to the north-east by Holod, to the east by Căpâlna, to the south-east by Șoimi and to the south by Olcea.

== Geographical features ==
Cociuba Mare is located in "Câmpia de Vest" which translates to the Western Plain. The total area spans 74,380km. The vast majority of the landscape is formed by "Câmpul Crișul Negru" (the Plains of the Black River) to the north and the houses of the villagers to the south. On the territory there is 1272 hectares of forest, mostly oak and sky with an average age of 45-50 years. 991 ha of forest land is owned by Cociuba Mare.

== Climate ==
Cociuba Mare has a moderate continental climate. Its average annual temperature is 10.5 degrees Celsius. The highest monthly average temperature is recorded in July as having been 21.2 degrees Celsius while the lowest monthly average temperature has been recorded as -15 degrees Celsius in January.

In winter there is generally frost along with defrosting. Spring is relatively short and high temperatures can occur suddenly in March. The weather is variable in April while in May the summer temperatures begin to appear. The hottest months are July and August. Autumns are generally long and sunny, lasting until November. The wettest months are May, June and November, with the vast majority of precipitation being rain.
