= 2018–19 CFR Cluj season =

CFR Cluj
2018–19 season
- Chairman: Iuliu Mureșan
- Manager: Edward Iordănescu; Toni Conceicao; Alin Minteuan; Dan Petrescu
- Stadium: Dr. Constantin Rădulescu
- Liga I: 1st
- Cupa României: Semi-finals
- Supercupa României: Winners
- Champions League: 2nd qualifying round
- Europa League: Play-off round
- Top goalscorer: League: George Țucudean (18 goals); All: George Țucudean (21 goals)
| Home colours | Away colours | Third colours |

The 2018–19 season will be the 48th season of competitive football by CFR Cluj. CFR Cluj will compete in the Liga I, Cupa României and Champions League.

== Previous season positions ==
| | Competition | Position |
|---|---|---|
| (Romania) | Liga I | 1st |
| (Romania) | Cupa României | Round of 32 |

== Competitions ==
Win Draw Loss

=== Overview ===
| Competition | First match | Last match | Starting round | Final position | Record | | | | | | | |
| Competition | First match | Last match | Starting round | Final position | Pld | W | D | L | GF | GA | GD | Win % |
|---|---|---|---|---|---|---|---|---|---|---|---|---|
| Liga I | 20 July 2018 | 19 May 2019 | Matchday 1 | Winners | 36 | 22 | 11 | 3 | 54 | 20 | +34 | 61.11 |
| Cupa României | 26 September 2018 | 24 April 2019 | Round of 32 | Semi-finals | 5 | 3 | 1 | 1 | 6 | 5 | +1 | 60.00 |
| Supercupa României | 14 July 2018 | | Final | Winners | 1 | 1 | 0 | 0 | 1 | 0 | +1 | 100.00 |
| Champions League | 24 July 2018 | 31 July 2018 | Second round | Second round | 2 | 0 | 1 | 1 | 1 | 2 | −1 | 0.00 |
| Europa League | 9 August 2018 | 30 August 2018 | Third round | Play-off round | 4 | 2 | 0 | 2 | 9 | 5 | +4 | 50.00 |
| Total | | | | | 48 | 28 | 13 | 7 | 71 | 32 | +39 | 58.33 |

Last updated: 8 August 2018
Source: Competitions

=== Liga I ===
The Liga I fixture list was announced on 5 July 2018.

==== Regular season ====
===== Table =====
| Pos | Team | Pld | W | D | L | GF | GA | GD | Pts | Qualification |
|---|---|---|---|---|---|---|---|---|---|---|
| 1 | CFR Cluj | 26 | 15 | 9 | 2 | 39 | 16 | +23 | 54 | Qualification for the Championship round |
| 2 | FCSB | 26 | 14 | 7 | 5 | 49 | 29 | +20 | 49 | Qualification for the Championship round |
| 3 | Universitatea Craiova | 26 | 13 | 6 | 7 | 43 | 24 | +19 | 45 | Qualification for the Championship round |
| 4 | Astra Giurgiu | 26 | 11 | 9 | 6 | 36 | 23 | +13 | 42 | Qualification for the Championship round |
| 5 | Viitorul Constanța | 26 | 11 | 5 | 10 | 26 | 27 | −1 | 38 | Qualification for the Championship round |

Source: LPF (in Romanian), Soccerway
Rules for classification: 1) Points; 2) Head-to-head points; 3) Head-to-head goal difference; 4) Head-to-head goals scored; 5) Goal difference; 6) Goals scored; 7) Play-off.

===== Results summary =====
| Overall | | | | | | | | Home | | | | | | Away | | | | | |
| Pld | W | D | L | GF | GA | GD | Pts | W | D | L | GF | GA | GD | W | D | L | GF | GA | GD |
|---|---|---|---|---|---|---|---|---|---|---|---|---|---|---|---|---|---|---|---|
| 30 | 18 | 10 | 2 | 44 | 17 | +27 | 64 | 7 | 7 | 1 | 23 | 11 | +12 | 11 | 3 | 1 | 21 | 6 | +15 |

Last updated: 7 April 2019.
Source: Liga I

===== Results by round =====
| Round | 1 | 2 | 3 | 4 | 5 | 6 | 7 | 8 | 9 | 10 | 11 | 12 | 13 | 14 | 15 | 16 | 17 | 18 | 19 | 20 | 21 | 22 | 23 | 24 | 25 | 26 |
|---|---|---|---|---|---|---|---|---|---|---|---|---|---|---|---|---|---|---|---|---|---|---|---|---|---|---|
| Ground | H | A | H | A | H | A | H | H | A | H | A | H | A | A | H | A | H | A | H | A | A | H | A | H | A | H |
| Result | D | D | W | W | W | D | L | D | W | D | W | W | W | W | D | W | W | W | D | W | W | D | L | W | W | W |
| Position | 6 | 8 | 3 | 1 | 1 | 2 | 2 | 5 | 3 | 3 | 2 | 1 | 1 | 1 | 1 | 1 | 1 | 1 | 1 | 1 | 1 | 1 | 1 | 1 | 1 | 1 |

Updated to match(es) played on 3 March 2019. Source: Liga I
A = Away; H = Home; W = Win; D = Draw; L = Loss

===== Matches =====
Win Draw Loss

| 20 July 2018 1 | CFR Cluj | 1–1 | FC Botoșani | Cluj-Napoca |
| 21:00 EEST (UTC+3) | Vinícius 26'; D.Djoković (yellow card) 59' | Report | R.Oaidă (yellow card) 19'; M.Roman (yellow card) 45'; Fülöp 48'; Soiledis (yellow card) 52'; M.A.Roman (yellow card) 85'; Patache (yellow card) 86'; J.Rodríguez (yellow card) 87' | Stadium: Dr. Constantin Rădulescu; Attendance: 4,000; Referee: Marcel Bîrsan (Bucharest) |

| 28 July 2018 2 | Dunărea Călărași | 0–0 | CFR Cluj | Călărași |
| 18:00 EEST (UTC+3) | D.Ispas (yellow card) 21'; B.Șandru (yellow card) 42'; Monroy (yellow card) 90+2' | Report | Culio (yellow card) 38'; C.Manea (yellow card) 62'; Țucudean (yellow card) 84' | Stadium: Ion Comșa; Attendance: 7,300; Referee: Marius Avram |

| 4 August 2018 3 | CFR Cluj | 2–1 | Concordia Chiajna | Cluj-Napoca |
| 21:00 EEST (UTC+3) | Țucudean 54'; M.Bordeianu (yellow card) 70'; Culio 74' (pen.); Camora (yellow card) 90+2' | Report | Batin 84' | Stadium: Dr. Constantin Rădulescu; Attendance: 4,570; Referee: Sorin Andrei Antonie |

| 12 August 2018 4 | FC Voluntari | 1–2 | CFR Cluj | Voluntari |
| 18:00 EEST (UTC+3) | Laïdouni 12' (pen.); Bucurică (yellow card) 79' | Report | A.C.Ioniță 34'; Omrani (yellow card) 39'; S.Mailat (yellow card) 45'; Culio (yellow card) 77'; Țucudean 84'; Camora (yellow card) 88'; D.Djoković (yellow card) 89' | Stadium: Anghel Iordănescu; Attendance: 300; Referee: Cătălin Popa |

| 19 August 2018 5 | CFR Cluj | 3–1 | Dinamo București | Cluj-Napoca |
| 21:00 EEST (UTC+3) | Țucudean (yellow card) 29' (goal) 66', 78'; Omrani 73' | Report | D.Sorescu (yellow card) 22'; M.Popescu 61' | Stadium: Dr. Constantin Rădulescu; Attendance: 7,700; Referee: Radu Petrescu |

| 26 August 2018 6 | Gaz Metan Mediaș | 0–0 | CFR Cluj | Mediaș |
| 18:00 EEST (UTC+3) | S.Bușu (yellow card) 36' (yellow-red card) 71' | Report | R.Tambe (yellow card) 38'; M.Bordeianu (yellow card) 78' | Stadium: Gaz Metan; Attendance: 4,000; Referee: Sebastian Colțescu |

| 2 September 2018 7 | CFR Cluj | 1–2 | Viitorul Constanța | Cluj-Napoca |
| 18:30 EEST (UTC+3) | Maleš (yellow card) 45'; Țucudean 55' | Report | Voduț 86'; I.Hagi (yellow card) 87' (goal) 90+2' (pen.) | Stadium: Dr. Constantin Rădulescu; Attendance: 3,000; Referee: Ovidiu Hațegan |

| 16 September 2018 8 | CFR Cluj | 1–1 | FCSB | Cluj-Napoca |
| 21:00 EEST (UTC+3) | Arlauskis (yellow card) 20'; Camora (yellow card) 21'; D.Djoković (yellow card) 27'; Țucudean 48'; Omrani (yellow card) 50' | Report | D.Nedelcu (yellow card) 4'; A.Stan (yellow card) 8'; F.Coman 24'; Bălașa (yellow card) 38' | Stadium: Dr. Constantin Rădulescu; Attendance: 12,000; Referee: Radu Petrescu |

| 22 September 2018 9 | Hermannstadt | 0–1 | CFR Cluj | Târgu Mureș |
| 15:00 EEST (UTC+3) | B.Company (yellow card) 27'; Tsoumou (yellow card) 62' | Report | T.Moutinho (yellow card) 11'; Țucudean (yellow card) 47' (goal) 69' | Stadium: Trans-Sil; Attendance: 100; Referee: Marcel Bîrsan (Bucharest) |

| 1 October 2018 10 | CFR Cluj | 0–0 | Universitatea Craiova | Cluj-Napoca |
| 21:00 EEST (UTC+3) | Culio (yellow card) 67'; Camora (yellow card) 85' | Report | Briceag (yellow card) 38'; V.Mihăilă (yellow card) 45'; Cicâldău (yellow card) 55'; Donkor (yellow card) 57'; A.Mitriță (yellow card) 90' | Stadium: Dr. Constantin Rădulescu; Attendance: 3,500; Referee: István Kovács (Carei) |

| 6 October 2018 11 | Astra Giurgiu | 1–2 | CFR Cluj | Giurgiu |
| 21:00 EEST (UTC+3) | Belu-Iordache (yellow card) 24'; Zoua (yellow card) 67' (goal) 89' | Report | Țucudean 45+1'; T.Moutinho 55' | Stadium: Marin Anastasovici; Attendance: 3,000; Referee: Ovidiu Hațegan |

| 19 October 2018 12 | CFR Cluj | 1–0 | Politehnica Iași | Cluj-Napoca |
| 21:00 EEST (UTC+3) | A.Mureșan 19'; A.C.Ioniță (yellow card) 58'; Culio (yellow card) 81'; Arlauskis (yellow card) 90+3' | Report | | Stadium: Dr. Constantin Rădulescu; Attendance: 4,000; Referee: Cătălin Popa |

| 28 October 2018 13 | Sepsi Sfântu Gheorghe | 1–2 | CFR Cluj | Sfântu Gheorghe |
| 21:00 EET (UTC+2) | S.Drăghici (yellow card) 30'; Karnitsky (yellow card) 52'; F.Ștefan 80'; Vașvari (yellow card) 89' | Report | Omrani 14' (yellow card) 22'; Țucudean (yellow card) 59'; Maleš (red card) 65'; C.Deac (yellow card) 90+1' (goal) 90+1' (pen.) | Stadium: Municipal; Attendance: 3,500; Referee: Andrei Chivulete |

| 3 November 2018 14 | FC Botoșani | 1–5 | CFR Cluj | Botoșani |
| 21:00 EET (UTC+2) | Ongenda 83' | Report | Chitoșcă 10' (o.g.); Culio 28'; A.Păun 54'; C.Deac 69'; Omrani 73' | Stadium: Municipal; Attendance: 2,500; Referee: Alexandru Tudor (Bucharest) |

| 10 November 2018 15 | CFR Cluj | 0–0 | Dunărea Călărași | Cluj-Napoca |
| 21:00 EET (UTC+2) | Culio (yellow card) 90+6' | Report | Gligorov (yellow card) 55'; S.Cucu (yellow card) 64'; Straton (yellow card) 90+4' | Stadium: Dr. Constantin Rădulescu; Attendance: 2,500; Referee: Marcel Bîrsan (Bucharest) |

| 24 November 2018 16 | Concordia Chiajna | 0–1 | CFR Cluj | Chiajna |
| 18:30 EET (UTC+2) | M.Cristescu (yellow card) 39' | Report | Culio (yellow card) 7' (yellow-red card) 90+3'; D.Djoković 23' | Stadium: Concordia; Attendance: 500; Referee: Sebastian Colțescu |

| 30 November 2018 17 | CFR Cluj | 5–0 | FC Voluntari | Cluj-Napoca |
| 20:00 EET (UTC+2) | Omrani (yellow card) 10'; Țucudean 26', 56', 62'; C.Manea 85'; V.Costache 89' | Report | Răuță (yellow card) 53' | Stadium: Dr. Constantin Rădulescu; Attendance: 1,000; Referee: George Cătălin Găman |

| 4 December 2018 18 | Dinamo București | 0–3 | CFR Cluj | Bucharest |
| 20:00 EET (UTC+2) | D.Popa (yellow card) 22'; Zenke (yellow card) 27'; Nistor (yellow card) 40'; Gomelt (yellow card) 56' | Report | D.Djoković (yellow card) 31'; A.Păun 35'; Țucudean (yellow card) 38' (goal) 84'; M.Bordeianu (yellow card) 44'; Culio 51' (pen.) | Stadium: Dinamo; Attendance: 500; Referee: Marius Avram |

| 8 December 2018 19 | CFR Cluj | 2–2 | Gaz Metan Mediaș | Cluj-Napoca |
| 20:00 EET (UTC+2) | A.Păun (yellow card) 7'; Omrani 43', 87'; Culio (yellow card) 58' (goal) 90+5'; Vinícius (yellow card) 83' | Report | Ely 12'; A.Ivanov 32'; Trif (yellow card) 62' (yellow-red card) 64'; L.Aurélio (yellow card) 88' | Stadium: Dr. Constantin Rădulescu; Attendance: 2,000; Referee: Radu Petrescu |

| 17 December 2018 20 | Viitorul Constanța | 0–1 | CFR Cluj | Ovidiu |
| 20:00 EET (UTC+2) | | Report | Țucudean (yellow card) 28' (goal) 33'; D.Djoković (yellow card) 30'; Camora (yellow card) 90'; Omrani (yellow card) 90+4' | Stadium: Viitorul; Attendance: 1,000; Referee: István Kovács (Carei) |

| 22 December 2018 21 | FCSB | 0–2 | CFR Cluj | Bucharest |
| 20:00 EET (UTC+2) | Bălașa (yellow card) 72' (yellow-red card) 90+6'; M.Roman (red card) 72'; Gnohéré (yellow card) 74'; R.Benzar (yellow card) 89' | Report | C.Deac 28'; Camora (yellow card) 61'; Culio (yellow card) 74'; A.Mureșan (yellow card) 78' (yellow-red card) 90+2'; A.C.Ioniță 90+6' (pen.) | Stadium: Arena Națională; Attendance: 10,000; Referee: Sebastian Colțescu |

| 2 February 2019 22 | CFR Cluj | 1–1 | Hermannstadt | Cluj-Napoca |
| 20:00 EET (UTC+2) | Deac (yellow card) 28'; Păun (yellow card) 47'; Țucudean 77' | Summary | Tătar 29' (yellow card) 81'; Dumitriu (yellow card) 53'; Tsoumou (yellow card) 78'; Petrescu (yellow card) 90+3' | Stadium: Dr. Constantin Rădulescu; Attendance: 2,500; Referee: Marius Avram |

| 10 February 2019 23 | Universitatea Craiova | 2–0 | CFR Cluj | Craiova |
| 21:00 EET (UTC+2) | Cristea 14'; Kelić (yellow card) 36'; Koljić 78' | Summary | Manea (yellow card) 59'; Arlauskis (yellow card) 86'; Omrani (yellow card) 88'; Lang (yellow card) 90+2' | Stadium: Ion Oblemenco; Attendance: 28,000; Referee: Ovidiu Hațegan |

| 16 February 2019 24 | CFR Cluj | 1–1 | Astra Giurgiu | Cluj-Napoca |
| 20:00 EET (UTC+2) | Djoković (yellow card) 14'; Omrani (yellow card) 34'; Paulo Vinícius (yellow card) 37'; Mureșan 53'; Lang (yellow card) 72' | Summary | Butean (yellow card) 14'; Bejan (red card) 30'; Romário (yellow card) 61'; Mrzljak (yellow card) 68'; Radunović 73'; Lazar (yellow card) 90+4' | Stadium: Dr. Constantin Rădulescu; Attendance: 3,000; Referee: Marcel Bîrsan |

| 23 February 2019 25 | Politehnica Iași | 0–1 | CFR Cluj | Iași |
| 20:00 EET (UTC+2) | Gardoș (yellow card) 80'; Burlacu (yellow card) 90' | Summary | Culio (yellow card) 6' (yellow-red card) 17'; Deac (yellow card) 43'; Camora (yellow card) 88'; Thierry Moutinho (yellow card) 88'; Țucudean 90+3' | Stadium: Emil Alexandrescu; Attendance: 4,000; Referee: Iulian Călin |

| 3 March 2019 26 | CFR Cluj | 1–0 | Sepsi Sfântu Gheorghe | Cluj-Napoca |
| 20:00 EET (UTC+2) | Țucudean 15' | Summary | Rus (yellow card) 13' | Stadium: Dr. Constantin Rădulescu; Attendance: 3,000; Referee: George Rădulescu |

==== Championship round ====
===== Table =====
| Pos | Team | Pld | W | D | L | GF | GA | GD | Pts | Qualification |
|---|---|---|---|---|---|---|---|---|---|---|
| 1 | CFR Cluj (C) | 10 | 7 | 2 | 1 | 15 | 4 | +11 | 50 | Qualification to Champions League first qualifying round |
| 2 | FCSB | 10 | 7 | 2 | 1 | 18 | 6 | +12 | 48 | Qualification to Europa League first qualifying round |
| 3 | Viitorul Constanța | 10 | 6 | 2 | 2 | 18 | 10 | +8 | 39 | Qualification to Europa League second qualifying round |
| 4 | Universitatea Craiova | 10 | 4 | 1 | 5 | 8 | 10 | −2 | 36 | Qualification to Europa League first qualifying round |
| 5 | Astra Giurgiu | 10 | 2 | 0 | 8 | 6 | 20 | −14 | 27 | |
| 6 | Sepsi OSK | 10 | 0 | 1 | 9 | 5 | 20 | −15 | 20 | |

Source: Soccerway, Romanian Football Federation
Rules for classification: 1) Points; 2) Points without rounding; 3) Head-to-head points; 4) Head-to-head goal difference; 5) Head-to-head goals scored; 6) Goal difference; 7) Goals scored; 8) Play-off (only if needed to decide champion or teams for UEFA competitions). (Note: only criteria 6 and 7 are applied to establish the classification during the competition.)
(C) Champions

===== Results summary =====
| Overall | | | | | | | | Home | | | | | | Away | | | | | |
| Pld | W | D | L | GF | GA | GD | Pts | W | D | L | GF | GA | GD | W | D | L | GF | GA | GD |
|---|---|---|---|---|---|---|---|---|---|---|---|---|---|---|---|---|---|---|---|
| 10 | 7 | 2 | 1 | 15 | 4 | +11 | 23 | 4 | 1 | 0 | 8 | 2 | +6 | 3 | 1 | 1 | 7 | 2 | +5 |

Last updated: 19 May 2019.
Source: Liga I

===== Position by round =====
| Round | 1 | 2 | 3 | 4 | 5 | 6 | 7 | 8 | 9 | 10 |
|---|---|---|---|---|---|---|---|---|---|---|
| Ground | H | A | H | A | H | A | H | A | H | A |
| Result | W | W | W | D | D | W | W | W | W | L |
| Position | 1 | 1 | 1 | 1 | 1 | 1 | 1 | 1 | 1 | 1 |

Updated to match(es) played on 19 May 2019. Source: Liga I
A = Away; H = Home; W = Win; D = Draw; L = Loss

===== Matches =====
Win Draw Loss

| 9 March 2019 1 | CFR Cluj | 3–1 | Sepsi Sfântu Gheorghe | Cluj-Napoca |
| | Țucudean 1' (yellow card) 23'; Djoković 57' (yellow card) 60'; Culio (yellow card) 60' (yellow-red card) 70'; Deac 90+3' (pen.) | Summary | Vașvari 48'; Sato (yellow card) 55'; Mensah (yellow card) 82' (yellow-red card) 90+2'; Hadnagy (yellow card) 86'; Jovanović (yellow card) 90+2'; Flores (yellow card) 90+5' | Stadium: Dr. Constantin Rădulescu; Attendance: 2,500; Referee: Constantin Sebastian Colțescu |

| 16 March 2019 2 | Viitorul Constanța | 0–1 | CFR Cluj | Ovidiu |
| | | Summary | Omrani (yellow card) 11'; Bordeianu (yellow card) 27'; Deac (yellow card) 69'; Păun 73'; Camora (yellow card) 90' | Stadium: Viitorul; Attendance: 4,500; Referee: Marius Avram |

| 30 March 2019 3 | CFR Cluj | 1–0 | Astra Giurgiu | Cluj-Napoca |
| | Bordeianu 60'; Thierry Moutinho (yellow card) 90+3' | Summary | Llullaku (yellow card) 45' | Stadium: Dr. Constantin Rădulescu; Attendance: 3,000; Referee: Radu Petrescu |

| 7 April 2019 4 | Universitatea Craiova | 0–0 | CFR Cluj | Craiova |
| | Bancu (yellow card) 8'; Kelić (yellow card) 46' | Summary | Deac (yellow card) 29'; Manea (yellow card) 90+2' | Stadium: Ion Oblemenco; Attendance: 21,000; Referee: Marius Avram |

| 14 April 2019 5 | CFR Cluj | 0–0 | FCSB | Cluj-Napoca |
| | Djoković (yellow card) 52'; Camora (yellow card) 56' | Summary | Cristea (yellow card) 27'; Filip (yellow card) 81'; Júnior Morais (yellow card) 87'; Tănase (yellow card) 90+3' | Stadium: Dr. Constantin Rădulescu; Attendance: 14,000; Referee: István Kovács (referee) |

| 20 April 2019 6 | Sepsi Sfântu Gheorghe | 0–1 | CFR Cluj | Sfântu Gheorghe |
| | Gabriel (yellow card) 61'; Mensah (yellow card) 90+3' | Summary | Deac (yellow card) 18'; Țucudean 24'; Păun (yellow card) 89' | Stadium: Municipal; Attendance: 2,000; Referee: George Cătălin Găman |

| 29 April 2019 7 | CFR Cluj | 3–1 | Viitorul Constanța | Cluj-Napoca |
| | Camora 57'; Culio 67' (pen.); Paulo Vinícius 74' | Summary | Țîru (yellow card) 6'; Rivaldinho 14'; Băluță (yellow card) 17'; Drăguș (yellow card) 19'; Houri (yellow card) 77' | Stadium: Dr. Constantin Rădulescu; Attendance: 8,412; Referee: Sebastian Colțescu |

| 6 May 2019 8 | Astra Giurgiu | 1–5 | CFR Cluj | Giurgiu |
| | Llullaku 66' (pen.); Roșu (yellow card) 89' | Summary | Omrani 15'; Djoković 59' 73'; Culio (yellow card) 65'; Bejan 80' (o.g.); Hoban 87' | Stadium: Marin Anastasovici; Attendance: 800; Referee: Adrian Cojocaru |

| 12 May 2019 9 | CFR Cluj | 1–0 | Universitatea Craiova | Cluj-Napoca |
| | Culio 12' (pen.); Djoković (yellow card) 34'; Boli (yellow card) 71' | Summary | Donkor (yellow card) 37'; Kelić (yellow card) 48' | Stadium: Dr. Constantin Rădulescu; Referee: Ovidiu Hațegan |

| 19 May 2019 10 | FCSB | 1–0 | CFR Cluj | Bucharest |
| | Filipe Teixeira 53'; Roman (yellow card) 90+2' | Report | Păun (yellow card) 70'; Maleš (yellow card) 87'; Djoković (yellow card) 90+2' | Stadium: Arena Națională; Attendance: 3,274; Referee: Iulian Călin |

=== Cupa României ===
CFR Cluj will enter the Cupa României at the Round of 32.

==== Round of 32 ====
| 26 September 2018 Round of 32 | Chindia Târgoviște | 0–1 | CFR Cluj | Ploiești |
| | | | Tambe 33' | Stadium: Ilie Oană |

==== Round of 16 ====
| 31 October 2018 Round of 16 | Gaz Metan Mediaș | 0–1 | CFR Cluj | Mediaș |
| | | | Țucudean 65' | Stadium: Gaz Metan |

==== Quarter-finals ====
| 27 February 2019 Quarter-finals | Sepsi Sfântu Gheorghe | 0–1 | CFR Cluj | Sfântu Gheorghe |
| | | | Costache 60' | Stadium: Municipal |

==== Semi-finals ====
| 3 April 2019 First leg | CFR Cluj | 1–3 | Astra Giurgiu | Cluj-Napoca |
| | Bud 15' | | V. Gheorghe 4'; Bègue 35'; Butean 52' | Stadium: Dr. Constantin Rădulescu |

| 24 April 2019 Second leg | Astra Giurgiu | 2–2 (5–3 agg.) | CFR Cluj | Giurgiu |
| | Butean 34'; Alibec 37' (pen.) | | Costache 42', 66' | Stadium: Marin Anastasovici |

=== Supercupa României ===
CFR Cluj will play in the Romanian Supercup as winners of the Liga I against Cupa României winners Universitatea Craiova.

| 14 July 2018 Final | CFR Cluj | 1–0 | Universitatea Craiova | Craiova |
| 20:30 EET (UTC+02) | Culio 78' (pen.) | | | Stadium: Ion Oblemenco |

=== UEFA Champions League ===
As winners of the 2017-18 Liga I, CFR Cluj entered the Champions League at the second qualifying round.

==== Second qualifying round ====
The draw for the second round took place on 19 June. CFR Cluj was drawn to play against Swedish champions Malmö.

| 24 July 2018 1st Leg | CFR Cluj (Romania) | 0–1 | (Sweden) Malmö | Cluj-Napoca |
| | | Report | Strandberg 45' | Stadium: Dr. Constantin Rădulescu |

| 31 July 2018 2nd Leg | Malmö (Sweden) | 1–1 (2–1 agg.) | (Romania) CFR Cluj | Malmö |
| | Traustason 55' | Report | Djoković 36' | Stadium: Malmö |

=== UEFA Europa League ===
After losing to Swedish champions Malmö, CFR Cluj progressed to the Europa League Third Qualifying Round.

==== Third qualifying round ====
The draw for the third round took place on 23 July. CFR Cluj was drawn to play against losing Armenian champions Alashkert.

| 9 August 2018 1st Leg | Alashkert (Armenia) | 0–2 | (Romania) CFR Cluj | Yerevan |
| | | | Țucudean 5', 49' (pen.) | Stadium: Alashkert |

| 16 August 2018 2nd Leg | CFR Cluj (Romania) | 5–0 (7–0 agg.) | (Armenia) Alashkert | Cluj-Napoca |
| | Culio 19' (pen.); Omrani 45+1', 62'; Hoban 58'; Mailat 90+2' | | | Stadium: Dr. Constantin Rădulescu |

==== Play-off Round ====
After emphatically beating Alashkert, CFR Cluj advanced to the play-off round. The draw for the play-off round took place on 6 August. CFR Cluj was drawn to play against Luxembourg champions F91 Dudelange.

| 23 August 2018 1st Leg | F91 Dudelange (Luxembourg) | 2–0 | (Romania) CFR Cluj | Dudelange |
| | Turpel 67'; Sinani 80' | | | Stadium: Jos Nosbaum |

| 30 August 2018 2nd Leg | CFR Cluj (Romania) | 2–3 (2–5 agg.) | (Luxembourg) F91 Dudelange | Cluj-Napoca |
| | Tambe 85'; Omrani 88' | | Sinani 51', 54'; Turpel 78' | Stadium: Dr. Constantin Rădulescu |

== Statistics ==
=== Appearances and goals ===
As of 1 July 2018

| No. | Pos | Player | Liga I | | Cupa României | | Supercupa României | | Champions League | | Europa League | | Total | |
| No. | Pos | Player | Apps | Goals | Apps | Goals | Apps | Goals | Apps | Goals | Apps | Goals | Apps | Goals |

=== Squad statistics ===
| | Liga I | Cupa României | Supercupa României | Champions League | Europa League | Home | Away | Total Stats |
|---|---|---|---|---|---|---|---|---|
| Games played | 36 | 5 | 1 | 2 | 4 | 0 | 0 | 0 |
| Games won | 22 | 3 | 1 | 0 | 2 | 0 | 0 | 0 |
| Games drawn | 11 | 1 | 0 | 1 | 0 | 0 | 0 | 0 |
| Games lost | 3 | 1 | 0 | 1 | 2 | 0 | 0 | 0 |
| Goals scored | 54 | 6 | 1 | 1 | 9 | 0 | 0 | 0 |
| Goals conceded | 20 | 5 | 0 | 2 | 5 | 0 | 0 | 0 |
| Goal difference | 34 | 1 | 1 | -1 | 4 | 0 | 0 | 0 |
| Clean sheets | 0 | 3 | 1 | 0 | 2 | 0 | 0 | 0 |
| Goal by Substitute | 0 | 0 | 0 | 0 | 0 | 0 | 0 | 0 |
| Total shots | – | – | – | – | – | – | – | – |
| Shots on target | – | – | – | – | – | – | – | – |
| Corners | – | – | – | – | – | – | – | – |
| Players used | – | – | – | – | – | – | – | – |
| Offsides | – | – | – | – | – | – | – | – |
| Fouls suffered | – | – | – | – | – | – | – | – |
| Fouls committed | – | – | – | – | – | – | – | – |
| Yellow cards | 0 | 0 | 0 | 0 | 0 | 0 | 0 | 0 |
| Red cards | 0 | 0 | 0 | 0 | 0 | 0 | 0 | 0 |
| Winning rate | 61.11% | 60.00% | 100% | 0% | 50.00% | 0% | 0% | 0% |

Last updated: 13 July 2018
Source: Competitive matches

=== Goalscorers ===
As of 24 June 2018

| Rank | Position | Name | Liga I | Cupa României | Supercupa României | Champions League | Europa League | Total |
| Total | | | 0 | 0 | 0 | 0 | 0 | 0 |

=== Goal minutes ===
| | 1'–15' | 16'–30' | 31'–HT | 46'–60' | 61'–75' | 76'–FT | Extra time | Forfeit |
|---|---|---|---|---|---|---|---|---|
| Goals | 0 | 0 | 0 | 0 | 0 | 0 | 0 | 0 |
| Percentage | 0% | 0% | 0% | 0% | 0% | 0% | 0% | 0% |

Last updated: 2018 (UTC)
Source: cfr1907 (in Romanian)

=== Hat-tricks ===
| Player | Against | Result | Date | Competition |

=== Clean sheets ===
As of 2018

| Rank | Name | Liga I | Cupa României | Supercupa României | Champions League | Europa League | Total | Games played |
| Total | | 0 | 0 | 0 | 0 | 0 | 0 | 0 |

=== Disciplinary record ===
As of 2018

| Rank | Position | Name | Liga I | | | Cupa României | | | Supercupa României | | | Champions League | | | Europa League | | | Total | | |
| Rank | Position | Name | Yellow card | (yellow card) (yellow-red card) | Red card | Yellow card | (yellow card) (yellow-red card) | Red card | Yellow card | (yellow card) (yellow-red card) | Red card | Yellow card | (yellow card) (yellow-red card) | Red card | Yellow card | (yellow card) (yellow-red card) | Red card | Yellow card | (yellow card) (yellow-red card) | Red card |
| Total | | | 0 | 0 | 0 | 0 | 0 | 0 | 0 | 0 | 0 | 0 | 0 | 0 | 0 | 0 | 0 | 0 | 0 | 0 |

=== Attendances ===
As of 2018

| | Matches | Attendances | Average | High | Low |
|---|---|---|---|---|---|
| Liga I | 0 | 0 | 0 | 0 | 0 |
| Cupa României | 0 | 0 | 0 | 0 | 0 |
| Champions League | 0 | 0 | 0 | 0 | 0 |
| Europa League | 0 | 0 | 0 | 0 | 0 |
| Total | 0 | 0 | 0 | 0 | 0 |

== See also ==
- 2018–19 Cupa României
- 2018–19 Liga I
- 2018 Supercupa României
- 2018–19 UEFA Champions League
- 2018–19 UEFA Europa League
