= 2018–19 Sepsi OSK Sfântu Gheorghe season =

Sepsi Sfântu Gheorghe
2018–19 season
- Chairman: Dávid Kertész
- Manager: Eugen Neagoe (until May 2019); Marin Barbu (from May 2019)
- Stadium: Stadionul Municipal
- Liga I: 6th
- Cupa României: Quarter-finals
- Top goalscorer: League: Ibrahima Tandia (8); All: Ibrahima Tandia (8)
- Highest home attendance: 4,500
- Lowest home attendance: 2,000
- Biggest win: Sfântu Gheorghe 5–0 Mioveni
- All statistics correct as of 22 December 2018.

The 2018–19 season is Asociația Club Sportiv Sepsi OSK Sfântu Gheorghe's 8th season in existence and the 2nd season in Liga I. Sepsi will compete in the Liga I and Cupa României.

== Previous season positions ==
	Competition	Position
(Romania)	Liga I	9th
(Romania)	Cupa României	Round of 32

== Players ==
=== Squad information ===
Players and squad numbers last updated on 7 October 2018.
Note: Flags indicate national team as has been defined under FIFA eligibility rules. Players may hold more than one non-FIFA nationality.

No.	Name	Nat	Position(s)	Date of birth (age)	Signed in	Signed from	Transfer Fee	Notes
Goalkeepers
12	Relu Stoian	(Romania)	GK	1 March 1996 (age 30)	2018	(Romania) Daco-Getica București	Free	
33	Roland Niczuly	(Romania)	GK	21 September 1995 (age 31)	2016	(Romania) Universitatea Cluj	Free	
95	Béla Fejér	(Romania)	GK	11 May 1995 (age 31)	2016	(Romania) Târgu Mureș	Free	
Defenders
2	Gabriel de Moura	(Brazil)	RB	18 June 1988 (age 38)	2018	(Portugal) Gil Vicente	N/A	
3	Ousmane Viera	(Ivory Coast)	CB	21 December 1986 (age 39)	2018	Unattached	N/A	
4	Adrián Rus	(Romania)	CB	18 March 1996 (age 30)	2018	(Hungary) Balmazújváros	Free	
5	Igor Jovanović	(Germany)	CB / RB / LB	3 May 1989 (age 37)	2018	(Finland) Lahti	N/A	
11	Daisuke Sato	(Philippines)	LB	20 September 1994 (age 32)	2017	(Denmark) Horsens	Free	

== Transfers ==
=== In ===
Date	Pos.	Player	Age	Moving from	Fee	Notes	Source
Summer
20 June 2018	DF	(Romania) Florin Ștefan	22	(Romania) Daco-Getica București	N/A		
27 June 2018	DF	(Brazil) Gabriel	30	(Portugal) Gil Vicente	N/A		
1 July 2018	MF	(Romania) István Fülöp	28	(Hungary) Diósgyőr	N/A		
1 July 2018	MF	(Bulgaria) Stefan Velev	29	(Bulgaria) Slavia Sofia	Free		
1 July 2018	MF	(Romania) Gabriel Vașvari	31	(Romania) Poli Timişoara	Free		
1 July 2018	DF	(Germany) Igor Jovanović	29	(Finland) Lahti	N/A		
13 July 2018	DF	(Romania) Adrián Rus	22	(Hungary) Balmazújváros	Free		
31 July 2018	MF	(Belarus) Alyaksandr Karnitsky	29	(Russia) Tosno	Free		
5 September 2018	GK	(Romania) Relu Stoian	22	(Romania) Daco-Getica București	Free		
Winter
3 January 2019	FW	(Romania) Nicolae Carnat	20	(Romania) Dunărea Călăraşi	Free		

==== Loans in ====
Date	Pos.	Player	Age	Moving from	Fee	Notes	Source
Summer
15 June 2018	MF	(Romania) Stephan Drăghici	20	(Romania) Universitatea Craiova	N/A		
15 June 2018	FW	(Romania) Gabriel Dodoi	19	(Romania) CFR Cluj	N/A		
1 July 2018	MF	(France) Bryan Nouvier	23	(Romania) CFR Cluj	N/A		
10 July 2018	FW	(Hungary) Dániel Prosser	24	(Hungary) Puskás Akadémia	N/A		

=== Out ===
Date	Pos.	Player	Age	Moving to	Fee	Notes	Source
Summer
20 June 2018	MF	(Spain) Alex Rodriguez	24	(Scotland) Motherwell	Free		
30 June 2018	FW	(Nigeria) Benjamin Kuku	23	(Romania) Botoșani	N/A		
9 July 2018	DF	(Romania) Florin Dumbravă	23	(Romania) Poli Timișoara	Free		
28 July 2018	MF	(Croatia) Jure Obšivač	28	(Kazakhstan) Atyrau	Free		
3 August 2018	DF	(Spain) Albert Dalmau	26	(Spain) Lleida Esportiu	Free		
Autumn
16 October 2018	MF	(Scotland) Nick Ross	26	(Scotland) Brora Rangers	Free	Mid season transfer	

==== Loans out ====
Date	Pos.	Player	Age	Moving to	Fee	Notes	Source

== Pre-season and friendlies ==
Win Draw Loss

== Competitions ==
=== Overview ===
Competition	First match	Last match	Starting round	Final position	Record							
Competition	First match	Last match	Starting round	Final position	Pld	W	D	L	GF	GA	GD	Win %
Liga I	21 July 2018	20 May 2019	Matchday 1	6th	36	10	8	18	37	45	−8	27.78
Cupa României	25 September 2018	27 February 2019	Round of 32	Quarter-finals	3	1	1	1	6	2	+4	33.33
Total					39	11	9	19	43	47	−4	28.21

Last updated: 20 May 2019
Source: Competitions

=== Liga I ===
The Liga I fixture list was announced on 5 July 2018.

==== Regular season ====
===== Table =====
Pos	Team	Pld	W	D	L	GF	GA	GD	Pts	Qualification
4	Astra Giurgiu	26	11	9	6	36	23	+13	42	Qualification for the Championship round
5	Viitorul Constanța	26	11	5	10	26	27	−1	38	Qualification for the Championship round
6	Sepsi OSK	26	10	7	9	32	25	+7	37	Qualification for the Championship round
7	Botoșani	26	9	9	8	31	33	−2	36	Qualification for the Relegation round
8	Politehnica Iași	26	10	4	12	28	38	−10	34	Qualification for the Relegation round

Source: LPF (in Romanian), Soccerway
Rules for classification: 1) Points; 2) Head-to-head points; 3) Head-to-head goal difference; 4) Head-to-head goals scored; 5) Goal difference; 6) Goals scored; 7) Play-off.

===== Results summary =====
Overall								Home						Away					
Pld	W	D	L	GF	GA	GD	Pts	W	D	L	GF	GA	GD	W	D	L	GF	GA	GD
26	10	7	9	32	25	+7	37	6	2	5	17	12	+5	4	5	4	15	13	+2

Last updated: 3 March 2019.
Source: Liga I

===== Results by round =====
Round	1	2	3	4	5	6	7	8	9	10	11	12	13	14	15	16	17	18	19	20	21	22	23	24	25	26
Ground	A	H	A	H	A	A	H	A	H	A	H	A	H	H	A	H	A	H	H	A	H	A	H	A	H	A
Result	L	W	D	W	L	D	W	W	D	D	L	W	L	L	D	W	D	W	L	W	W	L	L	W	D	L
Position	12	6	9	3	6	7	5	3	4	5	7	6	7	7	7	6	6	5	7	5	4	5	6	5	5	6

Updated to match(es) played on 3 March 2019. Source: Liga I
A = Away; H = Home; W = Win; D = Draw; L = Loss

===== Matches =====
Win Draw Loss

21 July 2018 1	Hermannstadt	1–0	Sepsi Sfântu Gheorghe	Târgu Mureș
18:00 EEST (UTC+3)	Blănaru 12'; Antonov (yellow card) 19'; Petrescu (yellow card) 90+1'	Report		Stadium: Trans-Sil; Attendance: 400; Referee: Ovidiu Hațegan

29 July 2018 2	Sepsi Sfântu Gheorghe	1–0	Universitatea Craiova	Sfântu Gheorghe
18:00 EEST (UTC+3)	Viera (yellow card) 9'; Drăghici (yellow card) 34'; Vașvari (yellow card) 45'; Tandia 61'; Gabriel (yellow card) 83'; Hamed (yellow card) 90+3'	Report	Mitriță (yellow card) 67'	Stadium: Municipal; Attendance: 3,000; Referee: Iulian Călin

4 August 2018 3	Astra Giurgiu	1–1	Sepsi Sfântu Gheorghe	Giurgiu
18:00 EEST (UTC+3)	Buș 4', (yellow card) 52'; Stan (yellow card) 83'	Report	Nouvier (yellow card) 32'; Simonovski (yellow card) 54', (goal) 62'; Mensah (yellow card) 74'	Stadium: Marin Anastasovici; Attendance: 500; Referee: Adrian Cojocaru

12 August 2018 4	Sepsi Sfântu Gheorghe	3–0	Politehnica Iași	Sfântu Gheorghe
21:00 EEST (UTC+3)	Viera 30'; Mensah (yellow card) 42'; Velev 56'; Niczuly (yellow card) 77'; Hamed 78'; Karnitsky (yellow card) 86'	Report	Flores (yellow card) 18'; Frăsinescu (yellow card) 53'; Petre (yellow card) 88'	Stadium: Municipal; Attendance: 3,000; Referee: Andrei Chivulete

19 August 2018 5	Steaua București	2–0	Sepsi Sfântu Gheorghe	Bucharest
18:00 EEST (UTC+3)	Bălașa (yellow card) 70'; Gnohéré 81' (pen.); Coman 85'	Report	Sato (yellow card) 58'; Gabriel (yellow card) 84'	Stadium: Arena Națională; Attendance: 3,583; Referee: George Rădulescu

27 August 2018 6	Botoșani	0–0	Sepsi Sfântu Gheorghe	Botoșani
18:00 EEST (UTC+3)	Soiledis (yellow card) 44'	Report	Drăghici (yellow card) 63'; Jovanović (yellow card) 65'	Stadium: Municipal; Attendance: 1,500; Referee: Horia Mladinovici

31 August 2018 7	Sepsi Sfântu Gheorghe	1–0	Dunărea Călărași	Sfântu Gheorghe
19:30 EEST (UTC+3)	Simonovski 3', (yellow card) 41'; Drăghici (yellow card) 90+4'	Report	Simion (yellow card) 28'; Alexandru (yellow card) 45'; Dobrosavlevici (yellow card) 50'; Ispas (yellow card) 73'	Stadium: Municipal; Attendance: 3,500; Referee: Sorin Antonie

14 September 2018 8	Concordia Chiajna	0–3	Sepsi Sfântu Gheorghe	Chiajna
18:00 EEST (UTC+3)	Leca (yellow card) 42'; Gorobsov (yellow card) 60'; Marc (yellow card) 63'	Report	Sato (yellow card) 31'; Viera (yellow card) 52'; Tandia 76', 90+1'; Nouvier 83'; Jovanović (yellow card) 87'	Stadium: Concordia; Attendance: 200; Referee: Sebastian Colțescu

21 September 2018 9	Sepsi Sfântu Gheorghe	1–1	Voluntari	Sfântu Gheorghe
18:00 EEST (UTC+3)	Velev (yellow card) 22'; Tandia (yellow card) 42', (goal) 90+6'; Simonovski (yellow card) 64'; Fülöp (yellow card) 87'	Report	Malfleury 28'; Ricardinho (yellow card) 30'; Căpățînă (yellow card) 48'; Vlad (yellow card) 65'; Laïdouni (yellow card) 90+5'; Vâtcă (yellow card) 90+5'	Stadium: Municipal; Attendance: 3,500; Referee: George Găman

28 September 2018 10	Dinamo București	0–0	Sepsi Sfântu Gheorghe	Bucharest
21:00 EEST (UTC+3)	Grigore (yellow card) 51'; Subotić (yellow card) 78'; Nistor (yellow card) 90+1'	Report	Drăghici (yellow card) 20'; Velev (yellow card) 56'; Tandia (yellow card) 90'	Stadium: Dinamo; Attendance: 1,200; Referee: Marius Avram

7 October 2018 11	Sepsi Sfântu Gheorghe	1–2	Gaz Metan Mediaș	Sfântu Gheorghe
18:00 EEST (UTC+3)	Hamed 31'; Mensah (yellow card) 85'	Report	Cristea 38'; Fortes (yellow card) 57'; Trif (yellow card) 60'; Ely (yellow card) 75'; Olaru (yellow card) 84'; Caiado 89'	Stadium: Municipal; Attendance: 3,500; Referee: Radu Petrescu

20 October 2018 12	Viitorul Constanța	2–3	Sepsi Sfântu Gheorghe	Ovidiu
21:00 EEST (UTC+3)	Natkho (yellow card) 4'; Luchin 13'; Băluță 81'; Drăguș (yellow card) 83'; Houri (yellow card) 89'	Report	Jovanović 7'; Ștefan (yellow card) 25'; Drăghici (yellow card) 35'; Mensah 67'; Velev (yellow card) 84'; Viera (yellow card) 84'; Tandia 86'; Gabriel (yellow card) 89'; Niczuly (yellow card) 90+3'	Stadium: Viitorul; Attendance: 2,000; Referee: Sebastian Colțescu

28 October 2018 13	Sepsi Sfântu Gheorghe	1–2	CFR Cluj	Sfântu Gheorghe
21:00 EEST (UTC+3)	Drăghici (yellow card) 30'; Karnitsky (yellow card) 52'; Ștefan 81'; Hamed (yellow card) 81'; Vașvari (yellow card) 89'	Report	Omrani 14', (yellow card) 22'; Tucudean (yellow card) 60'; Males (red card) 64'; Deac 90+1' (pen.), (yellow card) 90+1'	Stadium: Municipal; Attendance: 3,500; Referee: Andrei Chivulete

3 November 2018 14	Sepsi Sfântu Gheorghe	1–3	Hermannstadt	Sfântu Gheorghe
18:00 EET (UTC+2)	Tandia 42'; Ștefan (yellow card) 48'; Viera (yellow card) 69'; Mensah (yellow card) 74'	Report	Dumitriu 46'; Tsoumou 57'; Company (yellow card) 60'; Stoica (yellow card) 64'; Dâlbea 70' (pen.); Pârvulescu (yellow card) 74'	Stadium: Municipal; Attendance: 2,500; Referee: Marian Barbu

9 November 2018 15	Universitatea Craiova	1–1	Sepsi Sfântu Gheorghe	Craiova
21:00 EET (UTC+2)	Bărbuț (yellow card) 34'; Martić (yellow card) 47' (yellow-red card) 90+4'; Mitriță (yellow card) 52' (yellow-red card) 57'; Burlacu 83'; Donkor (yellow card) 88'	Report	Gabriel (yellow card) 29'; Karnitsky 37'; Sato (yellow card) 86'; Jovanović (yellow card) 90+1'	Stadium: Ion Oblemenco; Attendance: 14,000; Referee: Radu Petrescu

24 November 2018 16	Sepsi Sfântu Gheorghe	1–0	Astra Giurgiu	Sfântu Gheorghe
16:00 EET (UTC+2)	Drăghici (yellow card) 24'; Vașvari (yellow card) 69'; Tandia 78'; Jovanović (yellow card) 90+1'	Report	Belu (yellow card) 71'; Radunović (yellow card) 87'	Stadium: Municipal; Attendance: 2,500; Referee: Marcel Bîrsan

30 November 2018 17	Politehnica Iași	1–1	Sepsi Sfântu Gheorghe	Iași
17:30 EET (UTC+2)	Flores 21'	Report	Vașvari 9'; Karnitsky (yellow card) 74'	Stadium: Emil Alexandrescu; Attendance: 1,200; Referee: Alexandru Tudor

5 December 2018 18	Sepsi Sfântu Gheorghe	4–2	FCSB	Sfântu Gheorghe
20:00 EET (UTC+2)	Vașvari 32'; Ștefan 37'; Tandia 54' (pen.); Mensah 90+4'	Report	Coman 61'; Rusescu 88'	Stadium: Municipal; Attendance: 2,500; Referee: Horațiu Fesnic

10 December 2018 19	Sepsi Sfântu Gheorghe	0–1	Botoșani	Sfântu Gheorghe
17:30 EET (UTC+2)	Tandia (yellow card) 65'; Nouvier (yellow card) 79'	Report	Golofca 33'; L. Fülöp (yellow card) 54'; Fraisl (yellow card) 70'; Miron (yellow card) 74'; Soiledis (yellow card) 90+2'	Stadium: Municipal; Attendance: 2,000; Referee: Adrian Cojucaru

16 December 2018 20	Dunărea Călărași	0–3	Sepsi Sfântu Gheorghe	Călărași
14:00 EET (UTC+2)	Simion (yellow card) 49'; Dobrosavlevici (yellow card) 82'	Report	Nouvier 19', (yellow card) 72'; Tandia (yellow card) 21'; Rus (yellow card) 45'; Simonovski 53', 57'	Stadium: Ion Comșa; Attendance: 1,000; Referee: Ovidiu Hațegan

20 December 2018 21	Sepsi Sfântu Gheorghe	3–0	Concordia Chiajna	Sfântu Gheorghe
20:00 EET (UTC+2)	Gabriel (yellow card) 7'; Simonovski 35'; Ștefan 45+2'; Nouvier 59' (pen.); Viera (yellow card) 79'	Report	Ivanovici (yellow card) 7'; Batin (yellow card) 42'; Matei (yellow card) 57'; Bărboianu (yellow card) 76'	Stadium: Municipal; Referee: Sorin Antonie

3 February 2019 22	Voluntari	4–2	Sepsi Sfântu Gheorghe	Voluntari
17:00 EET (UTC+2)	Ricardinho 14'; Căpățînă (yellow card) 21'; Balaur 36'; Gadze 62'; Tudorie 77'	Summary	Tandia 24'; Viera (yellow card) 66'; Hamed 90'	Stadium: Anghel Iordănescu; Attendance: 500; Referee: Iulian Călin

9 February 2019 23	Sepsi Sfântu Gheorghe	0–1	Dinamo București	Sfântu Gheorghe
20:00 EET (UTC+2)	Hamed (yellow card) 19'; Viera (yellow card) 28'; Jovanović (yellow card) 56'; Ștefan (yellow card) 86'	Summary	Zenke (yellow card) 46'; Aït-Atmane (yellow card) 52'; Nistor 57' (pen.); N'Diaye (yellow card) 65'; Montini (yellow card) 67'; Sorescu (yellow card) 82'; Aliji (yellow card) 90+2'	Stadium: Municipal; Attendance: 4,500; Referee: Constantin Sebastian Colțescu

17 February 2019 24	Gaz Metan Mediaș	0–1	Sepsi Sfântu Gheorghe	Mediaș
17:30 EET (UTC+2)	Ely (yellow card) 44'; Rondón (yellow card) 49'; Constantin (yellow card) 59'	Summary	Tandia 9' (pen.); Rus (yellow card) 32'; Jovanović (yellow card) 44'; Omar (yellow card) 44'; Gabriel (yellow card) 57'	Stadium: Gaz Metan; Attendance: 3,000; Referee: István Kovács (referee)

22 February 2019 25	Sepsi Sfântu Gheorghe	0–0	Viitorul Constanța	Sfântu Gheorghe
20:00 EET (UTC+2)	Gabriel (yellow card) 10'; Rus (yellow card) 45'; Vașvari (yellow card) 84'	Summary	Mladen (yellow card) 90+3'	Stadium: Municipal; Attendance: 2,000; Referee: Marcel Bîrsan

3 March 2019 26	CFR Cluj	1–0	Sepsi Sfântu Gheorghe	Cluj-Napoca
20:00 EET (UTC+2)	Țucudean 15'	Summary	Rus (yellow card) 13'	Stadium: Dr. Constantin Rădulescu; Attendance: 3,000; Referee: George Rădulescu

==== Championship round ====
===== Table =====
Pos	Team	Pld	W	D	L	GF	GA	GD	Pts	Qualification
1	CFR Cluj (C)	10	7	2	1	15	4	+11	50	Qualification to Champions League first qualifying round
2	FCSB	10	7	2	1	18	6	+12	48	Qualification to Europa League first qualifying round
3	Viitorul Constanța	10	6	2	2	18	10	+8	39	Qualification to Europa League second qualifying round
4	Universitatea Craiova	10	4	1	5	8	10	−2	36	Qualification to Europa League first qualifying round
5	Astra Giurgiu	10	2	0	8	6	20	−14	27	
6	Sepsi OSK	10	0	1	9	5	20	−15	20	

Source: Soccerway, Romanian Football Federation
Rules for classification: 1) Points; 2) Points without rounding; 3) Head-to-head points; 4) Head-to-head goal difference; 5) Head-to-head goals scored; 6) Goal difference; 7) Goals scored; 8) Play-off (only if needed to decide champion or teams for UEFA competitions). (Note: only criteria 6 and 7 are applied to establish the classification during the competition.)
(C) Champions

===== Results summary =====
Overall								Home						Away					
Pld	W	D	L	GF	GA	GD	Pts	W	D	L	GF	GA	GD	W	D	L	GF	GA	GD
10	0	1	9	5	20	−15	1	0	1	4	1	8	−7	0	0	5	4	12	−8

Last updated: 20 May 2019.
Source: Liga I

===== Position by round =====
Round	1	2	3	4	5	6	7	8	9	10
Ground	A	H	H	A	H	H	A	A	H	A
Result	L	L	D	L	L	L	L	L	L	L
Position	6	6	6	6	6	6	6	6	6	6

Updated to match(es) played on 20 May 2019. Source: Liga I
A = Away; H = Home; W = Win; D = Draw; L = Loss

===== Matches =====
Win Draw Loss

9 March 2019 1	CFR Cluj	3–1	Sepsi Sfântu Gheorghe	Cluj-Napoca
	Țucudean 1' (yellow card) 23'; Djoković 57' (yellow card) 60'; Culio (yellow card) 60' (yellow-red card) 70'; Deac 90+3' (pen.)	Summary	Vașvari 48'; Sato (yellow card) 55'; Mensah (yellow card) 82' (yellow-red card) 90+2'; Hadnagy (yellow card) 86'; Jovanović (yellow card) 90+2'; Flores (yellow card) 90+5'	Stadium: Dr. Constantin Rădulescu; Attendance: 2,500; Referee: Constantin Sebastian Colțescu

15 March 2019 2	Sepsi Sfântu Gheorghe	0–1	Universitatea Craiova	Sfântu Gheorghe
	Hamed (yellow card) 90+2'	Summary	Mateiu 20'; Tiago Ferriera (yellow card) 45'; Bărbuț (yellow card) 71'	Stadium: Municipal; Attendance: 2,500; Referee: Andrei Florin Chivulete

1 April 2019 3	Sepsi Sfântu Gheorghe	0–0	Viitorul Constanța	Sfântu Gheorghe
	Rus (yellow card) 13'; Viera (yellow card) 38'; Gabriel (yellow card) 45'; Nouvier (yellow card) 49'	Summary	Artean (yellow card) 11'; Mățan (yellow card) 42'	Stadium: Municipal; Attendance: 2,000; Referee: Constantin Sebastian Colțescu

8 April 2019 4	FCSB	2–0	Sepsi Sfântu Gheorghe	Bucharest
	Pintilii (yellow card) 11'; Gnohéré 51' (pen.); Coman 59'; Hora (yellow card) 77'	Summary	Omar (yellow card) 43'	Stadium: Arena Națională; Attendance: 4,233; Referee: Radu Petrescu

15 April 2019 5	Sepsi Sfântu Gheorghe	0–1	Astra Giurgiu	Sfântu Gheorghe
	Vașvari (yellow card) 72'; Omar (yellow card) 79'	Summary	Mrzljak (yellow card) 56'; Llullaku (yellow card) 60'; Moise (yellow card) 73'; Cestor 88'	Stadium: Municipal; Attendance: 2,500; Referee: George Rădulescu

20 April 2019 6	Sepsi Sfântu Gheorghe	0–1	CFR Cluj	Sfântu Gheorghe
	Gabriel (yellow card) 61'; Mensah (yellow card) 90+3'	Summary	Deac (yellow card) 18'; Țucudean 24'; Păun (yellow card) 89'	Stadium: Municipal; Attendance: 2,000; Referee: George Cătălin Găman

29 April 2019 7	Universitatea Craiova	1–0	Sepsi Sfântu Gheorghe	Craiova
	Cicâldău 57'; Mihăilă (yellow card) 78'	Report	Tandia (yellow card) 15'; Fejér (yellow card) 48'; Flores (yellow card) 52'	Stadium: Ion Oblemenco; Attendance: 7,000; Referee: Horia Mladinovici

4 May 2019 8	Viitorul Constanța	3–1	Sepsi Sfântu Gheorghe	Ovidiu
	Calcan 51' 68'; Eric 75'	Report	Hamed 49'	Stadium: Viitorul; Attendance: 2,500; Referee: Marian Barbu

11 May 2019 9	Sepsi Sfântu Gheorghe	1–5	FCSB	Sfântu Gheorghe
	Karinsky (yellow card) 4'; Nouvier (yellow card) 20'; Sato (yellow card) 31'; Viera (yellow card) 64'; Mensah 74'	Report	Hora 6'; Roman 10'; Coman 46' 50'; Filip (yellow card) 66'; Rusescu 80' (pen.)	Stadium: Municipal; Attendance: 4,500; Referee: Marcel Bîrsan

20 May 2019 10	Astra Giurgiu	3–2	Sepsi Sfântu Gheorghe	Giurgiu
	Mrzljak 13'; Balaure 27'; Moise 63'	Report	Tandia 43'; Sîntean (yellow card) 45'; Omar (yellow card) 60'; Hamed (yellow card) 65'; Rudol (yellow card) 76'; Erico 90+2' (o.g.)	Stadium: Marin Anastasovici; Referee: Ionuţ Coza

=== Cupa României ===
25 September 2018 Round of 32	ASU Politehnica Timișoara	1–1 (a.e.t.) (2–4 p)	Sepsi Sfântu Gheorghe	Timișoara
19:00 EEST	Bilia (yellow card) 22'; Ignea 43'; Murariu (yellow card) 118'	Report	Karnitsky (yellow card) 7'; Prosser 17'	Stadium: Dan Păltinișanu; Attendance: 1,000; Referee: Marian Balaci
	Penalties
	Bănică (penalty scored); Coadă (penalty missed); Bozian (penalty scored); Cojocaru (penalty missed)		Hadnagy (penalty scored); Nouvier (penalty scored); Rus (penalty scored); Drăghici (penalty scored)

31 October 2018 Round of 16	Mioveni	0–5	Sepsi Sfântu Gheorghe	Mioveni
16:30 EEST	Burnea (yellow card) 82'	Report	Prosser 4'; Ștefan 13', (yellow card) 90+3'; Simonovski 25'; Nouvier 45'; Rus 64'; Hamed (yellow card) 83'	Stadium: Orășenesc; Attendance: 1,500; Referee: Iulian Dima

27 February 2019 Quarter Final	Sepsi Sfântu Gheorghe	0–1	CFR Cluj	Sfântu Gheorghe
20:00 EEST	Rus (yellow card) 65'; Vașvari (yellow card) 72'	Report	Camora (yellow card) 4'; Hoban (yellow card) 21'; Costache 60'; Jesús (yellow card) 83'; Bordeianu (yellow card) 90+1'	Stadium: Stadionul Municipal; Attendance: 2,500; Referee: George Găman

== Statistics ==
=== Appearances and goals ===
No.	Pos	Nat	Player	Total		Liga I		Cupa României	
No.	Pos	Nat	Player	Apps	Goals	Apps	Goals	Apps	Goals
Goalkeepers
12	GK	(Romania) ROU	Relu Stoian	0	0	0	0	0	0
33	GK	(Romania) ROU	Roland Niczuly	24	0	24	0	0	0
95	GK	(Romania) ROU	Béla Fejér	15	0	12	0	3	0
Defenders
2	DF	(Brazil) BRA	Gabriel	35	0	34	0	1	0
3	DF	(Ivory Coast) CIV	Ousmane Viera	31	1	31	1	0	0
4	DF	(Romania) ROU	Adrián Rus	17	1	14	0	3	1
5	DF	(Germany) GER	Igor Jovanović	35	1	34	1	1	0
11	DF	(Philippines) PHI	Daisuke Sato	29	0	24+4	0	1	0
16	DF	(Poland) POL	Sebastian Rudol	7	0	6	0	1	0
20	DF	(Kenya) KEN	Aboud Omar	9	0	8	0	1	0
96	DF	(Romania) ROU	Florin Ștefan	30	4	27	3	3	1
Midfielders
7	MF	(Costa Rica) CRC	Dylan Flores	10	0	9	0	1	0
8	MF	(Romania) ROU	Gabriel Vașvari	34	3	31	3	3	0
9	MF	(France) FRA	Bryan Nouvier	23	4	21	3	2	1
10	MF	(Mali) MLI	Birahima Tandia	34	11	34	11	0	0
14	MF	(Belarus) BLR	Alyaksandr Karnitsky	26	1	24	1	2	0
17	MF	(Romania) ROU	Călin Popescu	3	0	3	0	0	0
18	MF	(Romania) ROU	Etele Baláska	1	0	1	0	0	0
21	MF	(Romania) ROU	Yasin Hamed	30	4	27	4	3	0
23	MF	(Ghana) GHA	Joseph Mensah	29	3	26	3	3	0
24	MF	(Romania) ROU	István Fülöp	15	0	15	0	0	0
77	MF	(Bulgaria) BUL	Stefan Velev	37	1	34	1	3	0
Forwards
27	FW	(Romania) ROU	Nicolae Carnat	4	0	4	0	0	0
70	FW	(North Macedonia) MKD	Marko Simonovski	22	6	20	5	2	1
80	FW	(Romania) ROU	Attila Hadnagy	9	0	7	0	2	0
99	FW	(Romania) ROU	Andrei Sîntean	2	0	2	0	0	0
Transferred in mid-season
	DF	(Romania) ROU	Ionuț Ursu	5	0	3	0	2	0
	MF	(Romania) ROU	Stephan Drăghici	22	1	20	1	2	0
	FW	(Romania) ROU	Zsombor Veress	0	0	0	0	0	0
	FW	(Romania) ROU	Gabriel Dodoi	3	0	1	0	2	0
	FW	(Hungary) HUN	Dániel Prosser	4	2	2	0	2	2

Last updated: 20 May 2019
Source: Competitions

=== Goalscorers ===
As of 22 December 2018

Rank	Nat	Position	Name	Liga I	Cupa României	Total
1	(Mali)	MF	Birahima Tandia	8	0	8
2	(North Macedonia)	FW	Marko Simonovski	5	1	6
3	(Romania)	DF	Florin Ștefan	3	1	4
3	(France)	MF	Bryan Nouvier	3	1	4
5	(Romania)	MF	Yasin Hamed	2	0	2
5	(Hungary)	FW	Dániel Prosser	0	2	2
5	(Romania)	MF	Gabriel Vașvari	2	0	2
5	(Ghana)	MF	Joseph Mensah	2	0	2
9	(Ivory Coast)	DF	Ousmane Viera	1	0	1
9	(Bulgaria)	MF	Stefan Velev	1	0	1
9	(Germany)	DF	Igor Jovanović	1	0	1
9	(Romania)	DF	Adrián Rus	0	1	1
9	(Belarus)	MF	Alyaksandr Karnitsky	1	0	1
Total				29	6	35

=== Clean sheets ===
As of 22 December 2018

Rank	Nat	Name	Liga I	Cupa României	Total
1	(Romania)	Roland Niczuly	8	0	8
2	(Romania)	Béla Fejér	1	1	2
Total			9	1	10

=== Disciplinary record ===
N	P	Nat.	Name	Liga I			Cupa României			Total			Notes
N	P	Nat.	Name	Yellow card	Second yellow card	Red card	Yellow card	Second yellow card	Red card	Yellow card	Second yellow card	Red card	Notes
7	MF	(Romania)	Stephan Drăghici	7						7			
2	DF	(Brazil)	Gabriel	5						5			
3	DF	(Ivory Coast)	Ousmane Viera	5						5			
5	DF	(Germany)	Igor Jovanović	4						4			
10	MF	(Mali)	Birahima Tandia	4						4			
14	MF	(Belarus)	Alyaksandr Karnitsky	3			1			4			
23	MF	(Ghana)	Joseph Mensah	4						4			
8	MF	(Romania)	Gabriel Vașvari	3			1			4			
9	MF	(France)	Bryan Nouvier	3						3			
11	DF	(Philippines)	Daisuke Sato	3						3			
21	MF	(Romania)	Yasin Hamed	2			1			3			
70	FW	(North Macedonia)	Marko Simonovski	3						3			
77	MF	(Bulgaria)	Stefan Velev	3						3			
96	DF	(Romania)	Florin Ștefan	2			1			3			
33	GK	(Romania)	Roland Niczuly	2						2			
4	DF	(Romania)	Adrián Rus	1			1			2			
24	MF	(Romania)	István Fülöp	1						1			

Last updated: 22 December 2018
Source: Matches
Ordered by (red card) , (second yellow card) and (yellow card)
(yellow card) = Number of bookings; (second yellow card) = Number of sending offs after a second yellow card; (red card) = Number of sending offs by a direct red card.

== See also ==
- 2018–19 Cupa României
- 2018–19 Liga I
