= 2023 Cupa României final =

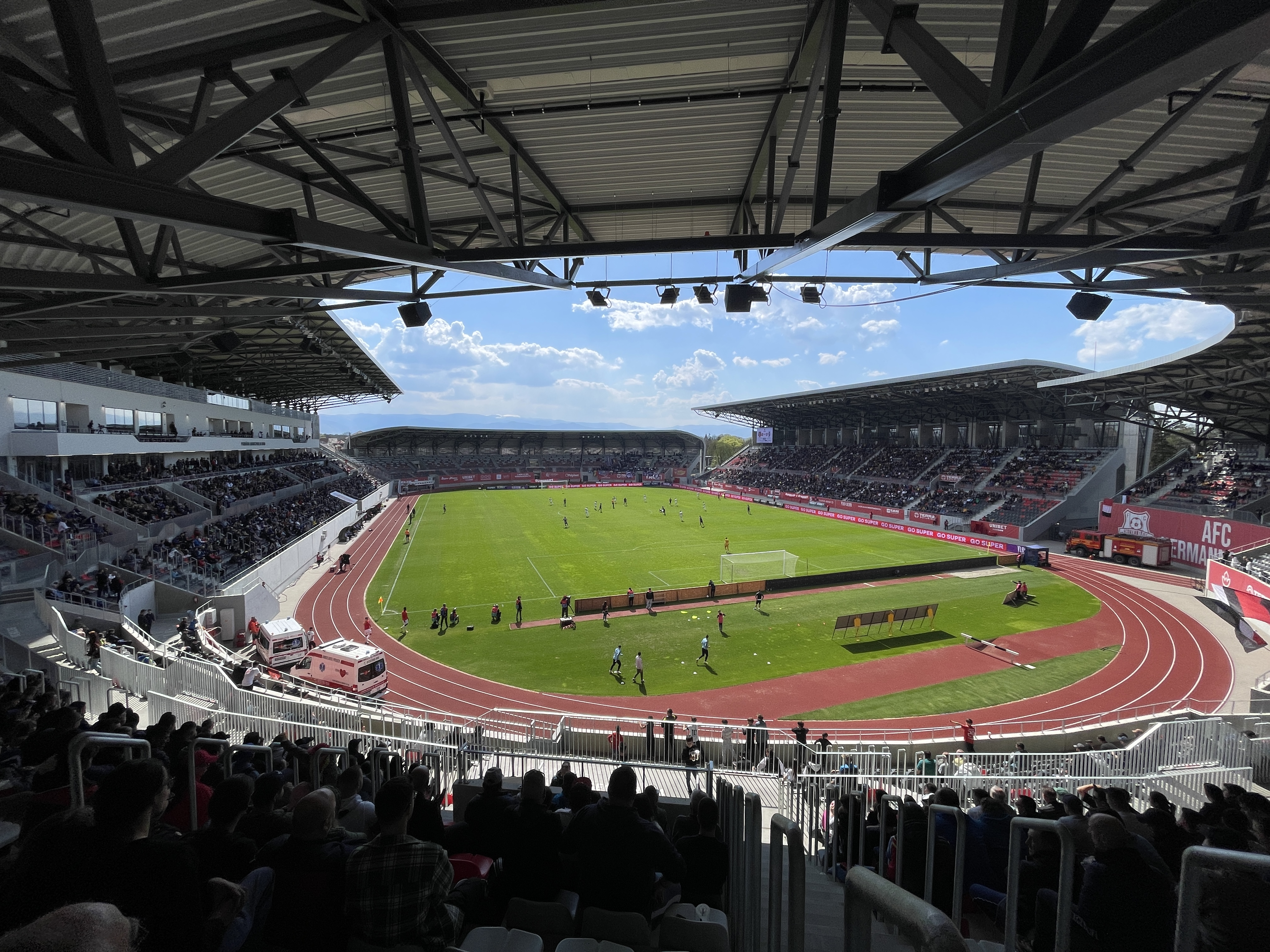
- The match took place at Municipal, Sibiu
- Event: 2022–23 Cupa României
Sepsi OSK	Universitatea Cluj
0	0
- Sepsi OSK won 5–4 after penalties
- Date: 24 May 2023
- Venue: Municipal, Sibiu
- Man of the Match: Roland Niczuly
- Referee: Cătălin Popa (Pitești)
- Attendance: 11,813
- Weather: Clear

The 2023 Romanian Cup final was the final match of the 2022–23 Cupa României and the 85th final of the Cupa României, Romania's premier football cup competition. It was played on 24 May 2023 at the Stadionul Municipal in Sibiu, between Sepsi OSK and Universitatea Cluj.

At the end of the 90 minutes, the score was 0–0, so extra time was needed. The score remained the same after the additional 30 minutes, and a penalty shootout was taken. Swiss player Ivan Martić missed the decisive penalty for Universitatea Cluj, sending the trophy to Sepsi OSK.

== Route to the final ==
Sepsi OSK		Round	Universitatea Cluj
Opponent	Results		Opponent	Results
bye	—	Play-off round	Concordia Chiajna	2–0 (A)
Petrolul Ploiești	3–1 (A)	Group stage – Week 1	CFR Cluj	1–1 (H)
Dinamo București	3–2 (A)	Group stage – Week 2	CSM Alexandria	4–0 (A)
FC Voluntari	4–0 (H)	Group stage – Week 3	Rapid București	0–0 (H)
CS Mioveni	4–1 (H)	Quarter-finals	FC Hermannstadt	2–1 (A)
CFR Cluj	3–0 (H)	Semi-finals	UTA Arad	1–0 (H)

== Match ==
24 May 2023
20:30 EEST (UTC+3)

Sepsi OSK	0–0 (a.e.t.)	Universitatea Cluj
	Detalii
Penalties
Varga (penalty scored); Rodríguez (penalty missed); Tudorie (penalty scored); Gheorghe (penalty scored); Ștefănescu (penalty scored); Aganović (penalty missed); Márk Tamás (penalty scored)	5–4	(penalty scored) Chipciu; (penalty scored) Bic; (penalty scored) Tescan; (penalty missed) Fernandes; (penalty scored) Nistor; (penalty missed) Gomes; (penalty missed) Martić

Municipal, Sibiu
Attendance: 11,813
Referee: Cătălin Popa (Pitești)

Sepsi OSK	Universitatea Cluj

GK	33	(Romania) Roland Niczuly (c)	(yellow card) 90+4'
DF	20	(Romania) Andres Dumitrescu	(yellow card) 92'
DF	82	(Slovakia) Branislav Niňaj
DF	45	(Romania) Denis Ciobotariu		(substituted off) 85'
DF	44	(Romania) Mihai Bălașa		(substituted off) 85'
MF	11	(Romania) Marius Ștefănescu	(yellow card) 45'
MF	5	(Argentina) Jonathan Rodríguez
MF	6	(Romania) Nicolae Păun		(substituted off) 111'
MF	13	(Romania) Cosmin Matei		(substituted off) 75'
FW	18	(Slovakia) Pavol Šafranko		(substituted off) 75'
FW	99	(Venezuela) Mario Rondón		(substituted off) 46'
Substitutes:
GK	12	(Romania) Răzvan Began
DF	4	(Hungary) Márk Tamás		(substituted on) 85'
MF	8	(Romania) Ion Gheorghe		(substituted on) 75'
FW	9	(Romania) Alexandru Tudorie		(substituted on) 75'
MF	22	(Guinea-Bissau) Francisco Júnior
DF	27	(Romania) Rareș Ispas
MF	77	(Croatia) Adnan Aganović		(substituted on) 46'
DF	88	(Bulgaria) Radoslav Dimitrov		(substituted on) 85'
FW	97	(Hungary) Roland Varga		(substituted on) 111'
Manager:
(Italy) Cristiano Bergodi

GK	33	(Romania) Andrei Gorcea
DF	27	(Romania) Alexandru Chipciu (c)
DF	17	(Romania) Andrei Pițian
DF	6	(Romania) Andrei Miron
DF	71	(Switzerland) Ivan Martić	(yellow card) 23'
MF	98	(Romania) Gabriel Simion
MF	94	(Romania) Ovidiu Bic
MF	16	(Romania) Ioan Filip		(substituted off) 80'
MF	8	(Belgium) Martin Remacle		(substituted off) 100'
MF	19	(Romania) Dan Nistor
FW	93	(Senegal) Mamadou Thiam		(substituted off) 99'
Substitutes:
GK	23	(Bulgaria) Plamen Iliev
FW	7	(Romania) Ianis Stoica
FW	11	(Romania) Dragoș Tescan		(substituted on) 99'
DF	18	(Romania) Florin Ilie
FW	21	(Portugal) José Gomes		(substituted on) 80'
DF	22	(Bulgaria) Ivan Goranov
DF	26	(Romania) Dorinel Oancea
MF	52	(Brazil) Romário Pires
FW	70	(Cape Verde) Ely Fernandes		(substituted on) 100'
Manager:
(Romania) Ioan Sabău

MAN OF THE MATCH

- (Romania) Roland Niczuly

MATCH OFFICIALS

- Assistant referees:
  - Daniel Mitruți (Craiova)
  - Bogdan Gheorghe (Bucharest)
- Fourth official:
  - Iulian Dima (Bucharest)
- Video assistant referee:
  - István Kovács (Carei)
- Assistant video assistant referee:
  - Andrei Chivulete (Bucharest)

MATCH RULES

- 90 minutes.
- 30 minutes of extra-time if necessary.
- Penalty shoot-out if scores still level.
- Nine named substitutes.
- Maximum of five substitutions, with a sixth allowed in extra time. (Note: Each team was given only three opportunities to make substitutions, with a fourth opportunity in extra time, excluding substitutions made at half-time, before the start of extra time, and at half-time in extra time.)
