= Roland Niczuly =

Romanian professional footballer

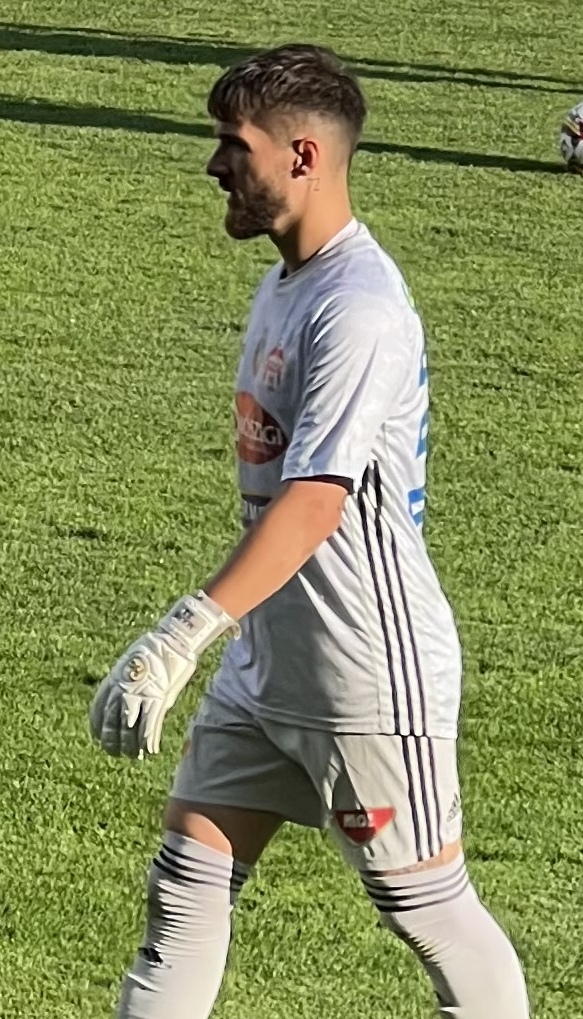
- Niczuly playing for Sepsi OSK in 2022

Personal information
- Full name: Roland Csaba Niczuly
- Date of birth: 21 September 1995 (age 31)
- Place of birth: Târgu Secuiesc, Romania
- Height: 1.82 m (6 ft 0 in)
- Position: Goalkeeper

Team information
- Current team: Sepsi OSK

Youth career
- 2004–2010: KSE Târgu Secuiesc
- 2010–2014: Universitatea Cluj

Senior career*
Years	Team	Apps	(Gls)
2014–2016	Universitatea Cluj	18	(0)
2014–2015	→ Unirea Tărlungeni (loan)	26	(0)
2016–	Sepsi OSK	269	(0)
- * Club domestic league appearances and goals as of 18 May 2025

Roland Csaba Niczuly (born 21 September 1995) is a Romanian professional footballer who plays as a goalkeeper for Liga I club Sepsi OSK.

== Career ==
A youth product of KSE Târgu Secuiesc and Universitatea Cluj, Niczuly was sent out on loan by the latter to Unirea Tărlungeni for the 2014–15 season. He made his senior debut on 30 August 2014, at age 19, in a 2–1 Liga II win over Olt Slatina. Niczuly was an undisputed starter during his stint in Brașov County, with the club finishing fourth in its series.

After his loan deal expired, Niczuly totaled 19 appearances in all competitions for Universitatea Cluj in the 2015–16 campaign. In the summer of 2016, he moved to Sepsi OSK, which immediately gained promotion to the Liga I by finishing second in the league. He went on to record his debut in the top tier on 16 July 2017, in a 0–1 loss to Astra Giurgiu.

On 22 July 2020, Niczuly was a starter in the 0–1 loss to FCSB in the Cupa României final. Two years later, he again played a Cupa României final, this time resulting in a 2–1 victory over Voluntari. On 24 May 2023, he won his second successive Cupa României final, saving three penalties in the 5–4 shoot-out win against Universitatea Cluj.

== Personal life ==
Born in Târgu Secuiesc, Niczuly is of Hungarian ethnicity, which has been the source of at least one xenophobic incident with spectators in games that he appeared in. In 2019, he married his partner Tania Alexia, a native of Cluj-Napoca with whom he has a son.

== Career statistics ==
As of match played 18 May 2025

Appearances and goals by club, season and competition
Club	Season	League			Cupa României		Continental		Other		Total	
Club	Season	Division	Apps	Goals	Apps	Goals	Apps	Goals	Apps	Goals	Apps	Goals
Universitatea Cluj	2015–16	Liga II	18	0	1	0	—		—		19	0
Unirea Tărlungeni (loan)	2014–15	Liga II	26	0	0	0	—		—		26	0
Sepsi OSK	2016–17	Liga II	31	0	1	0	—		—		32	0
Sepsi OSK	2017–18	Liga I	21	0	1	0	—		—		22	0
Sepsi OSK	2018–19	Liga I	24	0	0	0	—		—		24	0
Sepsi OSK	2019–20	Liga I	29	0	5	0	—		—		34	0
Sepsi OSK	2020–21	Liga I	30	0	1	0	—		1 (Note: Appearance in Liga I European play-offs)	0	32	0
Sepsi OSK	2021–22	Liga I	35	0	6	0	2 (Note: Appearances in UEFA Europa Conference League)	0	—		43	0
Sepsi OSK	2022–23	Liga I	36	0	4	0	4	0	1 (Note: Appearance in Supercupa României)	0	45	0
Sepsi OSK	2023–24	Liga I	35	0	2	0	6	0	1	0	44	0
Sepsi OSK	2024–25	Liga I	28	0	0	0	—		—		28	0
Sepsi OSK	2025–26	Liga II	0	0	0	0	—		—		0	0
Sepsi OSK	2026–27	Liga I	0	0	0	0	—		—		0	0
Sepsi OSK	Total		269	0	20	0	12	0	3	0	304	0
Career total			313	0	21	0	12	0	3	0	349	0

== Honours ==
Sepsi OSK

- Cupa României: 2021–22, 2022–23
- Supercupa României: 2022, 2023
