= Joseph Mensah (footballer) =

Ghanaian footballer

Personal information
- Date of birth: 29 September 1994 (age 32)
- Place of birth: Accra, Ghana
- Height: 1.69 m (5 ft 6 1/2 in)
- Position: Winger

Senior career*
Years	Team	Apps	(Gls)
2012–2014	Liberty Professionals	2	(0)
2014	→ Slavia Prague (loan)	1	(0)
2014–2017	Horsens	58	(2)
2018–2019	Sepsi OSK	26	(3)
2019–2020	İstanbulspor	2	(0)
2020	Bnei Yehuda	6	(1)
2020–2021	Politehnica Iași	14	(0)
2022–2023	FK Otrant-Olympic	9	(1)
2023–2024	Kozara Gradiška	10	(0)
- * Club domestic league appearances and goals as of 12:54, 10 June 2021 (UTC)

Joseph Mensah (born 29 September 1994) is a Ghanaian professional footballer who plays as a left midfielder.

== Club career ==
=== AC Horsens ===
After a successful one week trial, Mensah signed a two-year contract with the Danish club on 1 August 2014. After only two months in the club, Mensah signed a new contract again, this time until the summer 2017. Mensah had a good season for AC Horsens in the Danish 1st Division with 18 games played in the 2014/15 season. After two good seasons, Mensah suffered a broken shin injury, that kept him out for about 5–6 months in October 2016. However, he signed a contract extension just one month after his injury. He went back from the injury at the start of April 2017. Mensah's contract got terminated on 15 December 2017.
