= 2022–23 Cupa României =

Cupa României 2022–23

Tournament details
- Country: Romania

Final positions
- Champions: Sepsi OSK
- Runners-up: Universitatea Cluj
- Conference League: Sepsi OSK

The 2022–23 Cupa României was the 85th season of the annual Romanian primary football knockout tournament. The winner qualified for the second qualifying round of the 2023–24 UEFA Europa Conference League. It was the first season in which the Round of 16 was replaced by a play-off, immediately followed by a group stage, in which the best 8 teams from Liga 1 were qualified directly.

== Group stage ==
The draw was held on 30 September 2022.

The teams that finished 1st and 2nd in each group qualified for the Quarter-Finals.

=== Group A ===
Pos	Team	Pld	W	D	L	GF	GA	GD	Pts	Qualification	SEP	FCU	VOL	DIN	USZ	PET
1	Sepsi OSK (1)	3	3	0	0	10	3	+7	9	Qualification for quarter-finals	—	—	4–0	—	—	—
2	FCU Craiova (1)	3	2	1	0	2	0	+2	7	Qualification for quarter-finals	—	—	1–0	—	—	—
3	FC Voluntari (1)	3	1	0	2	1	5	−4	3		—	—	—	—	—	—
4	Dinamo București (2)	3	0	2	1	5	6	−1	2		2–3	0–0	—	—	—	—
5	Unirea Slobozia (2)	3	0	2	1	3	4	−1	2		—	—	0–1	3–3	—	0–0
6	Petrolul Ploiești (1)	3	0	1	2	1	4	−3	1		1–3	0–1	—	—	—	—

Source: FRF

=== Group B ===
Pos	Team	Pld	W	D	L	GF	GA	GD	Pts	Qualification	UTA	MIO	FCS	BOT	GBZ	OTE
1	UTA Arad (1)	3	2	1	0	8	3	+5	7	Qualification for quarter-finals	—	—	2–2	—	—	—
2	CS Mioveni (1)	3	2	0	1	2	3	−1	6	Qualification for quarter-finals	0–3	—	—	1–0	—	—
3	FCSB (1)	3	1	2	0	4	2	+2	5		—	—	—	—	—	—
4	FC Botoșani (1)	3	1	0	2	1	3	−2	3		—	—	0–2	—	—	—
5	Gloria Buzău (2)	3	1	0	2	3	4	−1	3		1–3	—	—	0–1	—	—
6	Oțelul Galați (2)	3	0	1	2	0	3	−3	1		—	0–1	0–0	—	0–2	—

Source: FRF

=== Group C ===
Pos	Team	Pld	W	D	L	GF	GA	GD	Pts	Qualification	CFR	UCJ	FAR	RAP	DUM	ALX
1	CFR Cluj (1)	3	1	2	0	6	1	+5	5	Qualification for quarter-finals	—	—	—	—	—	—
2	Universitatea Cluj (1)	3	1	2	0	5	1	+4	5	Qualification for quarter-finals	1–1	—	—	0–0	—	—
3	Farul Constanța (1)	3	1	2	0	4	2	+2	5		0–0	—	—	—	—	—
4	Rapid București (1)	3	1	1	1	4	3	+1	4		—	—	0–2	—	—	—
5	CSC Dumbrăvița (2)	3	1	0	2	5	9	−4	3		0–5	—	—	1–4	—	—
6	CSM Alexandria (3)	3	0	1	2	2	10	−8	1		—	0–4	2–2	—	0–4	—

Source: FRF

=== Group D ===
Pos	Team	Pld	W	D	L	GF	GA	GD	Pts	Qualification	HER	ARG	MIN	UCV	OCN	CHI
1	FC Hermannstadt (1)	3	2	0	1	7	5	+2	6	Qualification for quarter-finals	—	—	—	0–2	—	4–1
2	FC Argeș Pitești (1)	3	1	2	0	3	2	+1	5	Qualification for quarter-finals	—	—	—	2–1	—	—
3	Minaur Baia Mare (2)	3	1	1	1	8	3	+5	4		2–3	0–0	—	—	—	—
4	Universitatea Craiova (1)	3	1	1	1	4	3	+1	4		—	—	—	—	—	—
5	CS Ocna Mureș (3)	3	1	1	1	2	7	−5	4		—	—	0–6	1–1	—	1–0
6	Chindia Târgoviște (1)	3	0	1	2	2	6	−4	1		—	1–1	—	—	—	—

Source: FRF

== Knockout stage ==
=== Bracket ===
Quarter-finals
Sepsi OSK	4
CS Mioveni	1
CFR Cluj	1
Argeș Pitești	0
Hermannstadt	1
Universitatea Cluj	2
UTA Arad	1
FCU Craiova	0

Semi-finals
Sepsi OSK	3
CFR Cluj	0
Universitatea Cluj	1
UTA Arad	0

Final
Sepsi OSK (p)	0 (5)
Universitatea Cluj	0 (4)

=== Quarter-finals ===
The matches were played on 4, 5 and 6 April 2023.

4 April 2023	UTA Arad (1)	1–0	FCU Craiova (1)	Arad
19:00 EEST	Postolachi 16'			Stadium: Francisc von Neuman; Referee: Horațiu Feșnic (Cluj-Napoca)

5 April 2023	FC Hermannstadt (1)	1–2	Universitatea Cluj (1)	Sibiu
19:00 EEST	Alhassan 41'		Chipciu 51'; Thiam 75'	Stadium: Municipal; Referee: Florin Chivulete (București)

6 April 2023	Sepsi OSK (1)	4–1	CS Mioveni (1)	Sfântu Gheorghe
18:00 EEST	Gheorghe 54'; Matei 69', 90'; Tudorie 90+5'		Rădescu 75'	Stadium: Sepsi Arena; Referee: Iulian Dima (București)

6 April 2023	CFR Cluj (1)	1–0	FC Argeș Pitești (1)	Cluj-Napoca
21:00 EEST	Krasniqi 89'			Stadium: Dr. Constantin Rădulescu; Referee: Marian Barbu (Făgăraș)

=== Semi-finals ===
The matches were played on 26 and 27 April 2023.

26 April 2023	Sepsi OSK (1)	3–0	CFR Cluj (1)	Sfântu Gheorghe
19:00 EEST	Păun 10'; Ștefănescu 29'; Rondón 81'			Stadium: Sepsi Arena; Referee: Adrian Cojocaru (Galați)

27 April 2023	Universitatea Cluj (1)	1–0	UTA Arad (1)	Cluj-Napoca
19:00 EEST	Nistor 44' (pen.)			Stadium: Cluj Arena; Referee: Horia Mladinovici (București)

== Final ==
24 May 2023	Sepsi OSK	0–0 (a.e.t.) (5–4 p)	Universitatea Cluj	Sibiu
20:30 EET (UTC+3)		Report		Stadium: Municipal Sibiu; Attendance: 11,813; Referee: Cătălin Popa (Pitești)
	Penalties
	Varga (penalty scored); Rodríguez (penalty missed); Tudorie (penalty scored); Gheorghe (penalty scored); Ștefănescu (penalty scored); Aganović (penalty missed); Márk Tamás (penalty scored)		(penalty scored) Chipciu; (penalty scored) Bic; (penalty scored) Tescan; (penalty missed) Fernandes; (penalty scored) Nistor; (penalty missed) Gomes; (penalty missed) Martić
