= Sibiu Municipal Stadium =

Romanian stadium

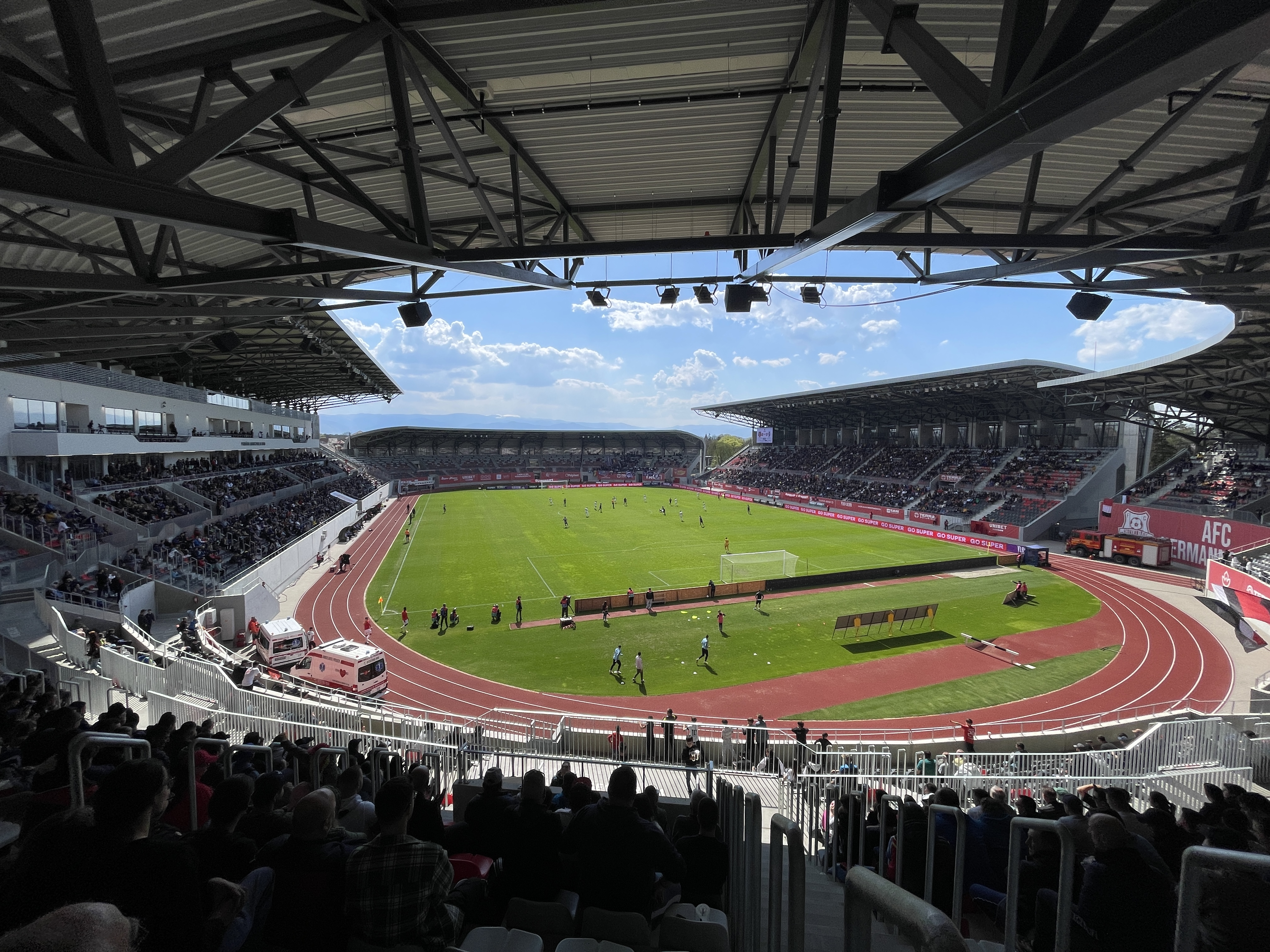
- Interactive map of Sibiu Municipal Stadium
- Address: 1-3 Mihai Eminescu Alley
- Location: Sibiu, Romania
- Coordinates: 45°46′59.9″N 24°8′37.6″E
- Owner: City of Sibiu
- Operator: Hermannstadt
- Capacity: 12,363
- Surface: Grass

Construction
- Built: 2018–2022
- Opened: December 10, 2022
- Cost: €32,65 million
- Architect: CON-A
- General contractor: City of Sibiu

Tenant
- Hermannstadt (2022–2026)

The Sibiu Municipal Stadium is a multi-purpose stadium in Sibiu, Romania. Hermannstadt is the ground's tenant. The facility will also be used for a variety of other activities such as track and field and events.

The stadium was inaugurated on December 10, 2022, when the local team from Sibiu, FC Hermannstadt played against the Liga I club, FCV Farul Constanța, trained by Romanian superstar Gheorghe Hagi.

Location of the final match of the 2022–23 Cupa României.

== See also ==
- List of football stadiums in Romania
