= Florin Ștefan =

Romanian footballer (born 1996)

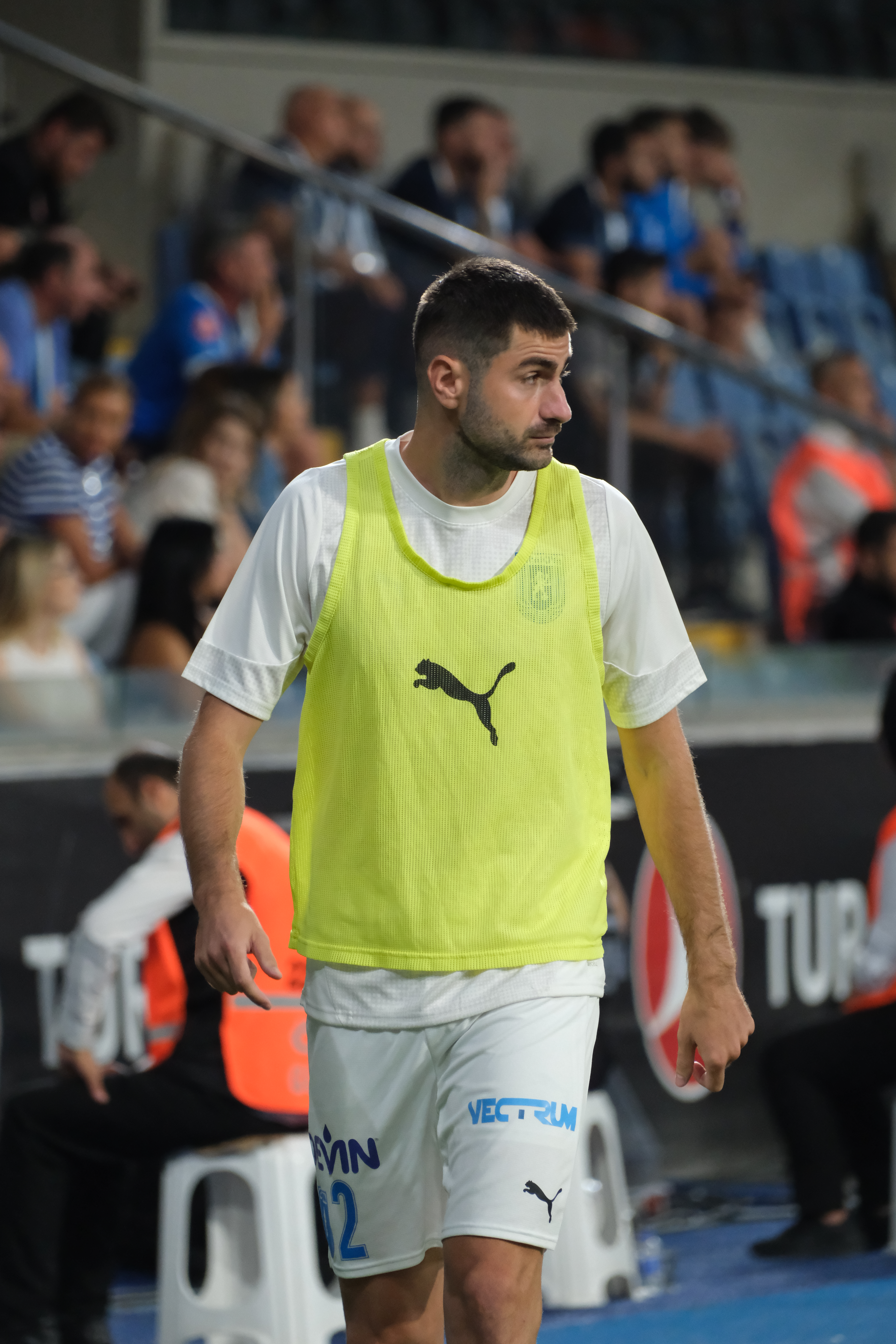
- Ștefan with Universitatea Craiova in 2025

Personal information
- Full name: Florin Bogdan Ștefan
- Date of birth: 9 May 1996 (age 30)
- Place of birth: Slatina, Romania
- Height: 1.83 m (6 ft 0 in)
- Position: Left-back

Youth career
- Școala de Fotbal Răzvan Raț
- –2012: Sporting Pitești
- 2012–2013: Olt Slatina

Senior career*
Years	Team	Apps	(Gls)
2014–2015	Olt Slatina	12	(1)
2016	Academica Clinceni	34	(5)
2017–2018	Juventus București	32	(2)
2018–2021	Sepsi OSK	80	(4)
2021–2022	CFR Cluj	8	(0)
2022–2023	Rapid București	13	(0)
2023–2025	Sepsi OSK	61	(6)
2025–2026	Universitatea Craiova	18	(0)
2026	Gaziantep	3	(0)

International career
2017–2019	Romania U21	12	(0)
2021	Romania Olympic	4	(0)
2019	Romania	1	(0)
- * Club domestic league appearances and goals as of 29 August 2026

Florin Bogdan Ștefan (born 9 May 1996) is a Romanian professional footballer who plays as a left-back.

== International career ==
Ștefan made his Romania national team debut on 8 September 2019, in a 1–0 win over Malta in the UEFA Euro 2020 qualifiers. He started the game and played the full 90 minutes.

== Career statistics ==
=== Club ===
As of match played 29 August 2026

Appearances and goals by club, season and competition
Club	Season	League			National cup (Note: Includes Cupa României)		Continental		Other		Total	
Club	Season	Division	Apps	Goals	Apps	Goals	Apps	Goals	Apps	Goals	Apps	Goals
Olt Slatina	2013–14	Liga II	5	0	0	0	—		—		5	0
Olt Slatina	2014–15	Liga II	7	1	0	0	—		—		7	1
Olt Slatina	Total		12	1	0	0	0	0	0	0	12	1
Academica Clinceni	2015–16	Liga II	16	0	0	0	—		—		16	0
Academica Clinceni	2016–17	Liga II	18	5	1	0	—		—		19	5
Academica Clinceni	Total		34	5	1	0	0	0	0	0	35	5
Juventus București	2016–17	Liga II	4	0	0	0	—		—		4	0
Juventus București	2017–18	Liga I	28	2	1	0	—		—		29	2
Juventus București	Total		32	2	1	0	0	0	0	0	33	2
Sepsi OSK	2018–19	Liga I	27	3	3	1	—		—		30	4
Sepsi OSK	2019–20	Liga I	33	1	4	0	—		—		37	1
Sepsi OSK	2020–21	Liga I	20	0	0	0	—		—		20	0
Sepsi OSK	Total		80	4	7	1	0	0	0	0	87	5
CFR Cluj	2021–22	Liga I	8	0	1	0	2 (Note: Appearances in UEFA Conference League)	0	—		11	0
Rapid București	2022–23	Liga I	13	0	3	0	—		—		16	0
Sepsi OSK	2023–24	Liga I	28	2	3	0	—		—		31	2
Sepsi OSK	2024–25	Liga I	33	4	1	0	—		—		34	4
Sepsi OSK	Total		61	6	4	0	0	0	0	0	65	6
Universitatea Craiova	2025–26	Liga I	18	0	6	1	2	0	—		26	1
Gaziantep	2026–27	Süper Lig	3	0	—		—		—		3	0
Career total			261	18	23	2	4	0	0	0	288	20

=== International ===
As of match played 8 September 2019

Appearances and goals by national team and year
National team	Year	Apps	Goals
Romania	2019	1	0
Total		1	0

== Honours ==
Juventus București

- Liga II: 2016–17

Sepsi OSK

- Cupa României runner-up: 2019–20

CFR Cluj

- Liga I: 2021–22

Universitatea Craiova

- Liga I: 2025–26
- Cupa României: 2025–26
