= Nicolae Păun (footballer) =

Romanian footballer

Personal information
- Full name: Nicolae Ionuț Păun
- Date of birth: 19 January 1999 (age 27)
- Place of birth: Caracal, Romania
- Height: 1.77 m (5 ft 10 in)
- Position: Midfielder

Team information
- Current team: Sepsi OSK
- Number: 6

Youth career
- CSȘ Caracal
- –2018: Viitorul Cluj
- 2018–2019: Sepsi OSK

Senior career*
Years	Team	Apps	(Gls)
2019–	Sepsi OSK	138	(10)
2019–2020	→ KSE Târgu Secuiesc (loan)		

International career^{‡}
2022	Romania	2	(0)
- * Club domestic league appearances and goals as of 7 November 2026 ‡ National team caps and goals as of 20 November 2022

Nicolae Ionuț Păun (born 19 January 1999) is a Romanian professional footballer who plays as a midfielder for Liga I club Sepsi OSK, which he captains.

== Club career ==
Păun made his Liga I debut for Sepsi OSK in a goalless draw with Universitatea Craiova, on 17 April 2021.

== International career ==
Păun was called up to the Romania national team for the first time by coach Edward Iordănescu on 24 May 2022, for the four opening group games with Montenegro, Bosnia and Herzegovina, and Finland in the UEFA Nations League.

== Career statistics ==
=== Club ===
As of match played 7 November 2026

Appearances and goals by club, season and competition
Club	Season	League			Cupa României		Continental		Other		Total	
Club	Season	Division	Apps	Goals	Apps	Goals	Apps	Goals	Apps	Goals	Apps	Goals
Sepsi OSK	2020–21	Liga I	8	0	0	0	—		1 (Note: Appearance in Liga I European play-offs)	0	9	0
Sepsi OSK	2021–22	Liga I	30	2	5	0	2 (Note: Appearance(s) in UEFA Europa Conference League)	0	—		37	2
Sepsi OSK	2022–23	Liga I	36	4	6	2	4	1	1 (Note: Appearance in Supercupa României)	0	47	7
Sepsi OSK	2023–24	Liga I	25	2	1	0	6	2	1	0	33	4
Sepsi OSK	2024–25	Liga I	0	0	0	0	—		—		0	0
Sepsi OSK	2025–26	Liga II	27	2	1	0	—		—		28	2
Sepsi OSK	2026–27	Liga I	12	0	1	1	—		—		13	1
Sepsi OSK	Total		138	10	14	3	12	3	3	0	167	16
Career total			138	10	14	3	12	3	3	0	167	16

=== International ===
As of match played 20 November 2022

Appearances and goals by national team and year
National team	Year	Apps	Goals
Romania
Romania	2022	2	0
Total		2	0

== Honours ==
Sepsi OSK

- Cupa României: 2021–22, 2022–23
- Supercupa României: 2022, 2023
