= Igor Jovanović =

Croatian footballer (born 1989)

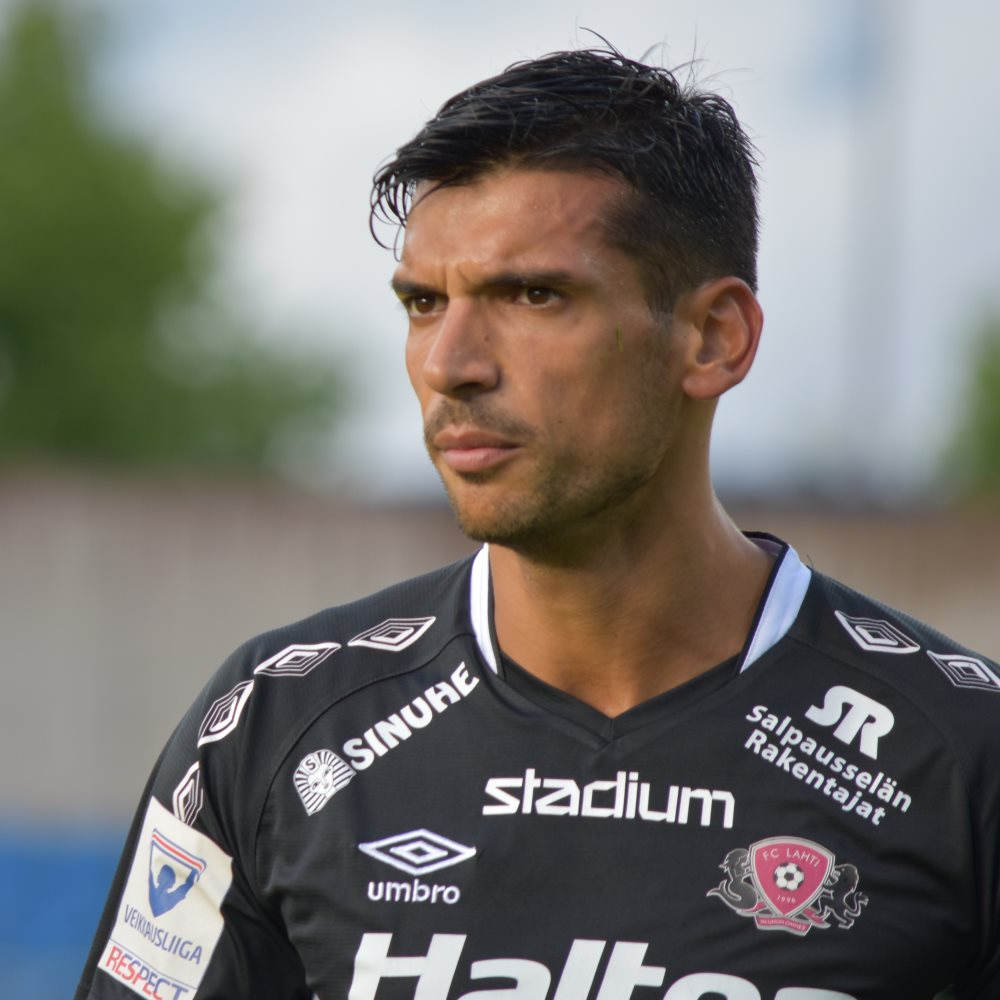

Personal information
- Date of birth: 3 May 1989 (age 37)
- Place of birth: Zagreb, SFR Yugoslavia
- Height: 1.85 m (6 ft 1 in)
- Position: Centre-back

Youth career
- –2005: 1860 München
- 2005–2006: SpVgg Unterhaching

Senior career*
Years	Team	Apps	(Gls)
2007–2008	Wacker Burghausen	6	(0)
2008	1. FC Kleve	23	(0)
2009–2010	TPS	25	(0)
2011	SV Babelsberg 03	18	(0)
2011–2013	Rot-Weiß Erfurt	7	(0)
2013	Jaro	19	(1)
2014	TPS	13	(1)
2014	Miedź Legnica	3	(0)
2014–2016	Bnei Sakhnin	27	(0)
2017–2018	Lahti	37	(2)
2018–2019	Sepsi OSK	34	(1)
2019	Panetolikos	20	(0)
2020	Seongnam	2	(0)
2021	Astra Giurgiu	10	(0)
2021	Sūduva	7	(0)
2022	Dinamo București	7	(0)
2022–2023	Brașov	8	(0)
- * Club domestic league appearances and goals as of 09:58, 17 January 2023 (UTC)

Igor Jovanović (born 3 May 1989) is a Croatian professional footballer who plays as a centre-back.

== Club career ==
Prior to the 2013 season, Jovanović signed a contract with Jaro of the Finnish Veikkausliiga. In June 2014, he moved to Polish club Miedź Legnica, but after three weeks he transferred to the Israeli Premier League club Bnei Sakhnin.

In 2020, he played for Seongnam.

In July 2021, he signed with Lithuanian Sūduva.

In January 2022, he signed a six-month contract with Romanian club Dinamo București.

== Honours ==
TPS

- Finnish Cup: 2010
