= Sfântu Gheorghe Municipal Stadium =

Romanian stadium

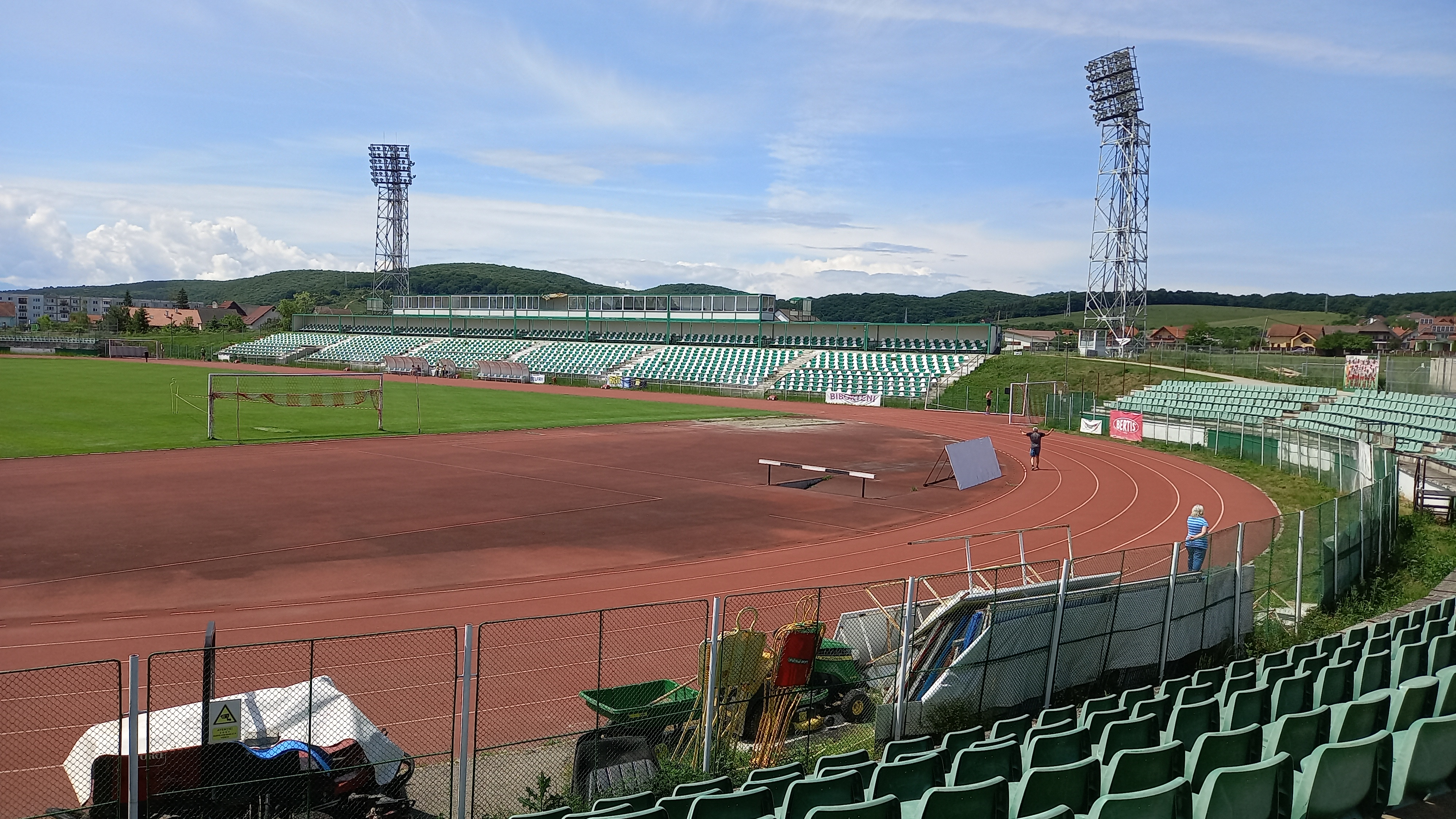
- Interactive map of Sfântu Gheorghe Municipal Stadium
- Former names: Oltul
- Address: Str. Stadionului
- Location: Sfântu Gheorghe, Romania
- Coordinates: 45°51′46.5″N 25°46′34.1″E
- Owner: Ministry of Youth and Sport
- Operator: Sepsi Sfântu Gheorghe
- Capacity: 4,774
- Surface: Grass
- Field size: 105 x 68m

Construction
- Opened: 1930
- Renovated: 2017

Tenants
- Oltul Sfântu Gheorghe (1932–2007); Viitorul Sfântu Gheorghe (2009–2011); Sepsi Sfântu Gheorghe (2011–2021)

The Sfântu Gheorghe Municipal Stadium (Romanian: Stadionul Municipal Sfântu Gheorghe din, Hungarian: Városi Stadion) is a multi-purpose stadium in Sfântu Gheorghe, Romania. It is used mostly for football matches and is the home ground of Sepsi OSK. The stadium holds 4,774 people.
