= Gabriel Vașvari =

Romanian footballer

Personal information
- Full name: Gabriel Cristian Vașvari
- Date of birth: 13 November 1986 (age 40)
- Place of birth: Zalău, Romania
- Height: 1.78 m (5 ft 10 in)
- Position: Centre midfielder

Team information
- Current team: SCM Zalău
- Number: 8

Youth career
- 1992–2003: Armătura Zalău
- 2003–2004: Rapid Zimbor

Senior career*
Years	Team	Apps	(Gls)
2004–2006	Armătura Zalău	17	(0)
2006	Universitatea 1919 Cluj		
2007	Zalău		
2008	Botoșani	29	(2)
2009	Zalău	23	(8)
2010–2017	Botoșani	215	(41)
2017–2018	ACS Poli Timișoara	36	(5)
2018–2022	Sepsi OSK	110	(16)
2022–2024	Politehnica Iași	19	(7)
2025–	SCM Zalău	2	(0)

Managerial career
- 2024–: SCM Zalău (sporting director)
- * Club domestic league appearances and goals as of 4 April 2025

Gabriel Cristian Vașvari (born 13 November 1986) is a Romanian professional footballer who plays as a midfielder for Liga III club SCM Zalău, which he captains.

== Club career ==
He made his debut on the professional league level in the Liga I for Botoșani on 21 July 2013 as a starter in a game against CFR Cluj. On 8 August 2013, Vașvari scored his first Liga I goal in a 2–1 win over FC Brașov.

== Career statistics ==
=== Club ===
As of match played 4 April 2025

Club	Season	League			National Cup (Note: Includes Cupa României)		League Cup (Note: Includes Cupa Ligii)		Europe		Other		Total	
Club	Season	Division	Apps	Goals	Apps	Goals	Apps	Goals	Apps	Goals	Apps	Goals	Apps	Goals
Armătura Zalău	2004–05	Divizia B	13	0	0	0	—		—		—		13	0
Armătura Zalău	2005–06	Divizia B	4	0	0	0	—		—		—		4	0
Armătura Zalău	Total		17	0	0	0	—		—		—		17	0
Botoșani	2007–08	Liga II	16	0	0	0	—		—		—		16	0
Botoșani	2008–09	Liga II	13	2	3	0	—		—		—		16	2
Botoșani	Total		29	2	3	0	—		—		—		32	2
Zalău	2008–09	Liga III	7	3	0	0	—		—		—		7	3
Zalău	2009–10	Liga III	16	5	4	2	—		—		—		20	7
Zalău	Total		23	8	4	2	—		—		—		27	10
Botoșani	2009–10	Liga II	10	1	0	0	—		—		—		10	1
Botoșani	2010–11	Liga II	28	4	1	1	—		—		—		29	5
Botoșani	2011–12	Liga II	24	3	1	0	—		—		—		25	3
Botoșani	2012–13	Liga II	21	8	4	1	—		—		—		25	9
Botoșani	2013–14	Liga I	30	7	1	0	—		—		—		31	7
Botoșani	2014–15	Liga I	33	7	1	0	1	0	—		—		35	7
Botoșani	2015–16	Liga I	33	6	0	0	1	0	4 (Note: Appearances in UEFA Europa League)	0	—		38	6
Botoșani	2016–17	Liga I	36	5	0	0	2	0	—		—		38	5
Botoșani	Total		212	41	8	2	4	0	4	0	—		231	43
ACS Poli Timișoara	2017–18	Liga I	36	5	2	0	—		—		—		38	5
Sepsi OSK	2018–19	Liga I	31	3	3	0	—		—		—		34	3
Sepsi OSK	2019–20	Liga I	36	7	5	0	—		—		—		41	7
Sepsi OSK	2020–21	Liga I	30	6	1	0	—		—		1 (Note: appearance in Liga I play-offs for UEFA Europa Conference League)	0	32	6
Sepsi OSK	2021–22	Liga I	13	0	2	0	—		2	0	—		17	0
Sepsi OSK	Total		110	16	11	0	—		2	0	1	0	124	16
Politehnica Iași	2022–23	Liga II	14	6	0	0	—		—		—		14	6
Politehnica Iași	2023–24	Liga I	5	1	1	0	—		—		—		6	1
Politehnica Iași	Total		19	7	1	0	—		—		—		20	7
SCM Zalău	2024–25	Liga III	2	0	—		—		—		—		2	0
Career total			448	79	29	4	4	0	6	0	1	0	488	83

== Honours ==
Zalău

- Divizia D – Sălaj County: 2005–06, 2006–07

Botoșani

- Liga II: 2012–13

Sepsi OSK

- Cupa României: 2021–22

Politehnica Iași

- Liga II: 2022–23
