= Sepsi OSK Sfântu Gheorghe =

Association football club in Sfântu Gheorghe

Sepsi OSK
- Full name: Asociația Club Sportiv Sepsi OSK Sfântu Gheorghe
- Nicknames: Piros-fehérek / Roș-albii (The Red and Whites); Székelyek / Secuii (The Székelys)
- Short name: Sepsi
- Founded: 2011; 15 years ago
- Ground: Sepsi Arena
- Capacity: 8,400
- Owner: László Diószegi
- Chairman: Attila Hadnagy
- Head coach: Ovidiu Burcă
- League: Liga I
- 2025–26: Liga II, 2nd of 22 (promoted)
- Website: sepsiosk.ro
Home colours	Away colours

Asociația Club Sportiv Sepsi OSK Sfântu Gheorghe, commonly known as Sepsi OSK (Hungarian: [ˈʃɛpʃi ˈoɛʃkaː]), Sepsi Sfântu Gheorghe (Romanian: [ˈsepsi ˈsfɨntu ˈɡe̯orɡe]), or simply Sepsi, is a Romanian professional football club based in Sfântu Gheorghe, Covasna County, that competes in the Liga I.

Founded in 2011, it achieved promotion to the top tier in six years by quickly climbing through the Romanian league system. Sepsi thus became the first team from Covasna—a county with a majority of Székely ethnics—to play in the Liga I. Since its promotion, it qualified for three Cupa României finals, claiming the trophy in the 2021–22 and 2022–23 seasons. As cup holders, Sepsi also participated in the 2022 and the 2023 Supercupa României, winning both.

Sepsi's club colours are red and white in honour of the local football tradition. After playing during its first years at the Municipal Stadium in Sfântu Gheorghe, the squad was moved to the namesake Sepsi Arena Stadium in 2021.

== History ==
=== Formation and ascent (2011–2017) ===
László Diószegi and Dávid Kertész decided to start a new football club in the summer of 2011. They picked the red and white colors to honor the football traditions of Sfântu Gheorghe and chose the name OSK as an acronym reminiscent of the defunct Olt Sport Klub. They wanted the name of the city to be also included in the club's name, so they chose the prefix Sepsi form Sepsiszentgyörgy, which is the Hungarian name of the city. In order to be able to enroll to Liga V they signed a collaboration agreement with Clubul Sportiv Școlar from Sfântu Gheorghe and formed a junior team.

In their debut season, they won the Liga V competition of Covasna County and were promoted to Liga IV. They finished second in their first Liga IV season, eight points behind local Viitorul Sfântu Gheorghe. Valentin Suciu—who would eventually guide them to Liga I—was appointed manager in 2013. At the end of the 2013–14 campaign, Sepsi OSK effortlessly won the Liga IV competition of Covasna County and qualified for the Liga III promotion play-off, where they faced the champion of Vrancea County, Selena Jariștea. Following a 1–1 draw after extra time, they won 6–5 on penalties, being subsequently promoted to the third division.

After a satisfying third place in the 2014–15 Liga III, promotion to Liga II was set as the objective for the next season. They won the 2015–16 Liga III and were promoted, which represented a notable performance for the team at the time. In the summer of 2016, Attila Hadnagy joined the team and became its captain. As he scored 28 goals in 31 games, the unexpected happened in the season which followed. They finished second in the 2016–17 Liga II and were promoted to Liga I, the top tier of the Romanian football league system.

=== Top league years (2017–present) ===
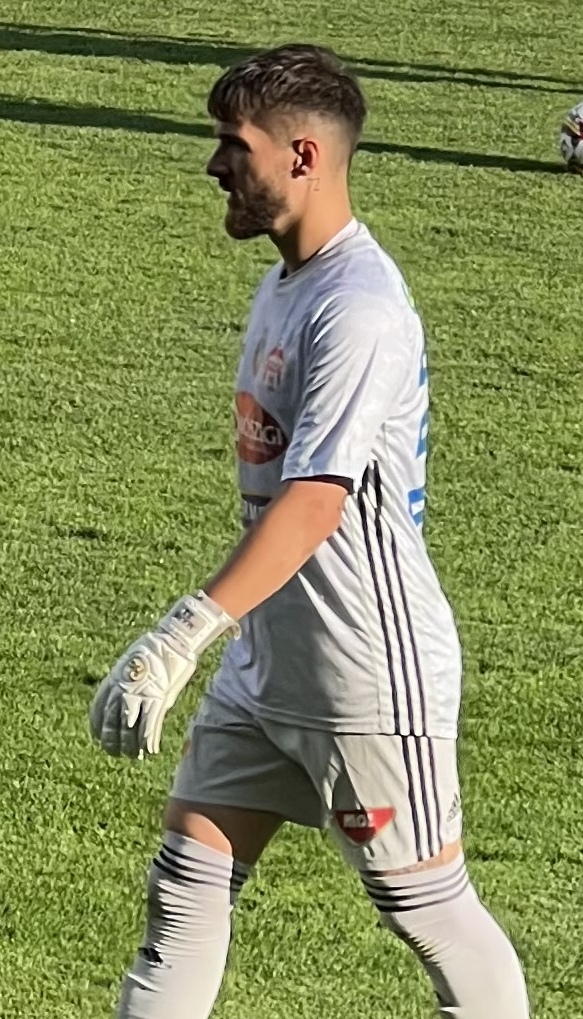
Roland Niczuly is Sepsi OSK's all-time leader in appearances and has won four trophies with the club.

As a last step in becoming fully professional in 2017, the club started a series of investments into infrastructure which included the creation of training grounds for its youth center and building a UEFA Category 4 stadium. In the years which followed the promotion, Sepsi OSK managed to stay in the Liga I, qualifying for the first time to the championship play-offs in the 2018–19 season.

In the summer of 2020, Sepsi reached the Cupa României final for the first time, but lost it 0–1 to FCSB at the Ilie Oană Stadium in Ploiești. On their route to the last game of the competition, Sepsi eliminated Ripensia Timișoara, Astra Giurgiu, Petrolul Ploiești and Politehnica Iași; in all but one of the five matches "the Székelys" scored at least three goals.

In the 2020–21 season, Sepsi entered the championship play-offs for the second time in their history. They finished fourth place and went on to defeat Viitorul Constanța 1–0 in the European play-offs, which meant they would take part for the first time in European competitions. Sepsi was drawn against Slovak side Spartak Trnava in the second round of the UEFA Conference League, but were eliminated due to a 3–4 penalty shoot-out loss after two draws.

The club secured a European spot again at the end of the 2021–22 campaign by winning the Cupa României final—left midfielder Marius Ștefănescu scored a double to bring Sepsi a 2–1 win over Voluntari at the Stadionul Rapid-Giulești in Bucharest. The club went on to win the 2022 Supercupa României with the same score against league champions CFR Cluj.

On 24 May 2023, Sepsi claimed its second consecutive national cup after a 5–4 penalty shoot-out defeat of Universitatea Cluj at the Stadionul Municipal in Sibiu, with goalkeeper Roland Niczuly saving three penalty shots. The club also repeated its performance in the Supercupa României, winning the 2023 edition 1–0 against Farul Constanța.

== Ownership and finances ==
Co-founder and present owner László Diószegi is an entrepreneur who runs the Diószegi chain of bakeries. After starting with a bakery shop opened in Sfântu Gheorghe by his family and another associate in the 1990s, the business grew to sell bakery products through several shops in Romania and England.

In comparison to other Liga I teams at the end of 2019, Sepsi OSK stood out with by far the highest revenue obtained from corporate sponsorship deals and having the least debt. Some of the companies that have or had sponsorship deals with Sepsi OSK include Hungarian firms Gyermelyi, OTP Bank and MOL.

Sepsi OSK was granted in total 2 billion Hungarian forints between 2017 and 2018 by the Hungarian government to be used for developing club infrastructure, thus contributing with approximately €6 million to build a youth center and the new stadium.

== Grounds ==
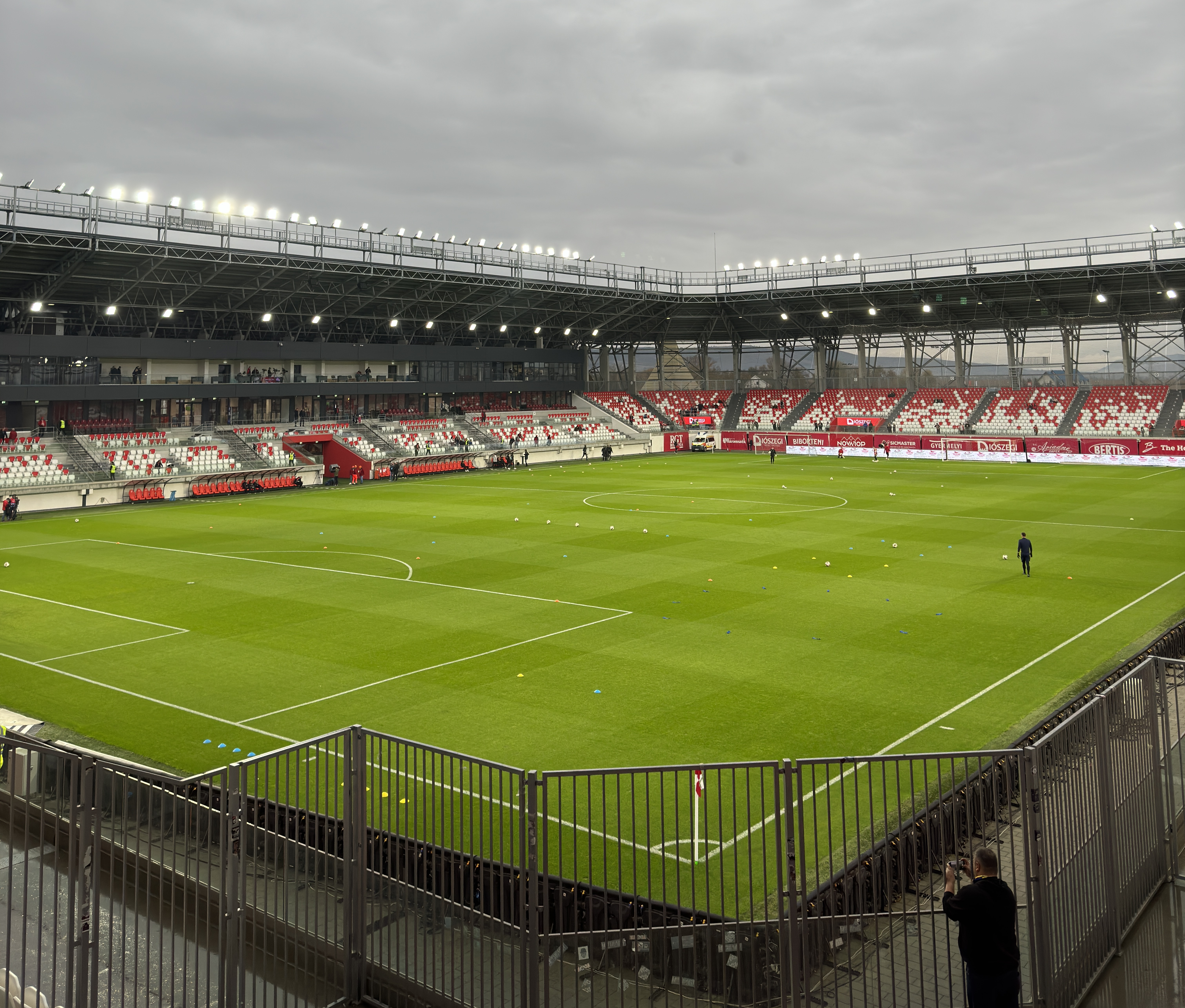
The new Stadionul Sepsi Arena.

=== Municipal Stadium ===
Sepsi OSK holds its home games at the Municipal Stadium in Sfântu Gheorghe. Located in the Simeria neighbourhood, it has a capacity of 5,200 seats. After the Liga I promotion of Sepsi OSK the Municipal Stadium did not meet the Liga I licensing requirements. As a result, Sepsi OSK was forced to hold all of its autumn 2017 home games at the Silviu Ploeșteanu Stadium in Brașov and the first two 2018 home games at the Ilie Oană Stadium in Ploiești.

Meanwhile, the structure of the stand was fortified to support TV-radio cabins in 2017. Also the seating capacity was increased the same year with 1,500 seats donated to Sepsi OSK from the demolished Ferenc Puskás Stadium. The old floodlight system of DAC was also donated to Sepsi OSK and installed in the stadium in 2018. As a result, Sepsi OSK was able to play its first ever Liga I game in Sfântu Gheorghe on 19 March 2018. Ownership of the stadium was transferred from the Romanian Ministry of Youth and Sport to the City Council of Sfântu Gheorghe in 2019.

=== Sepsi OSK Stadium ===
The construction of a new UEFA Category 4 stadium with a capacity of 8,450 seats was started on a lot near Sepsi Arena in the summer of 2018. The new Sepsi OSK Stadium was opened with a league match against FC Voluntari in 2021.

== Support ==
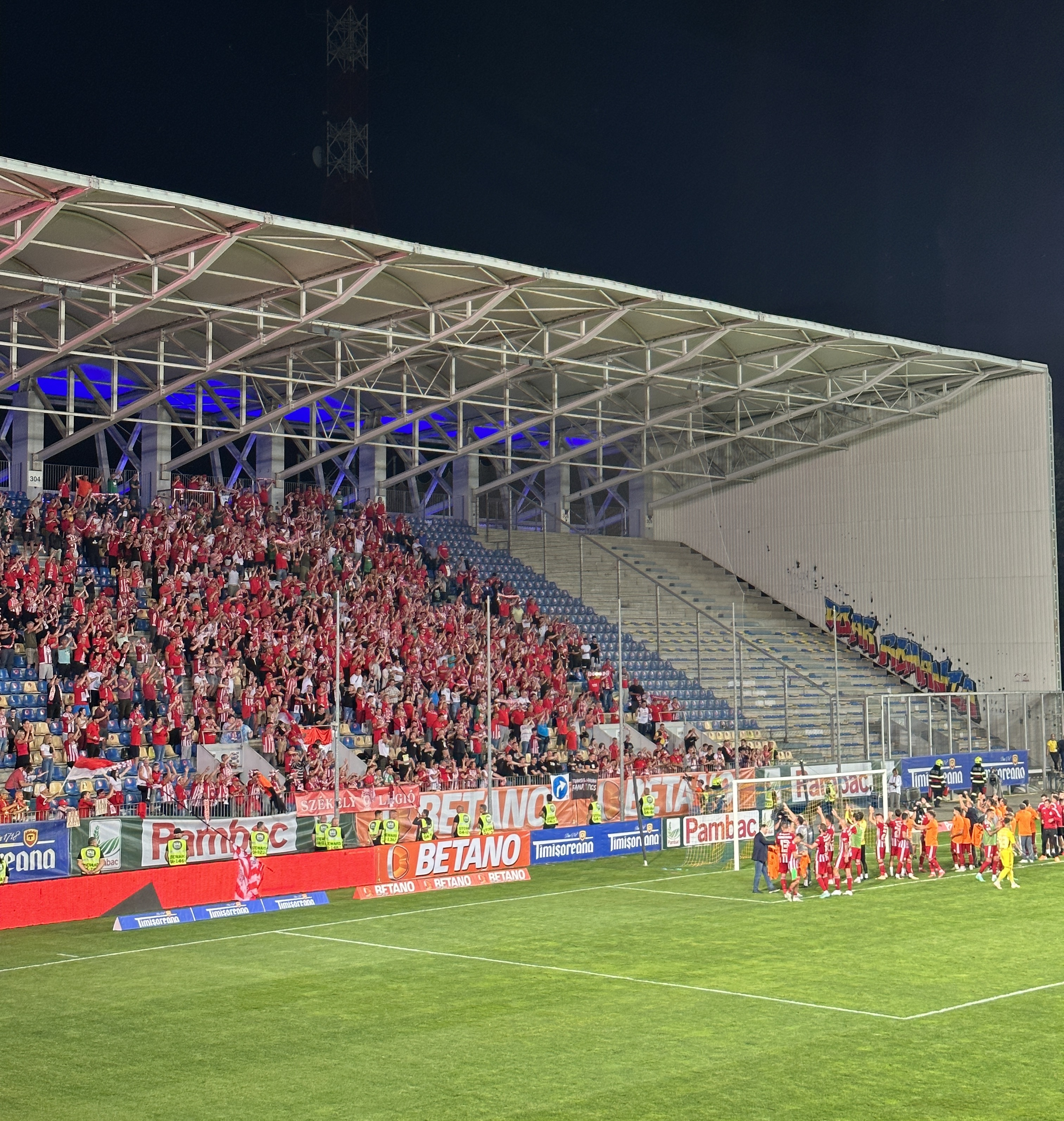
Sepsi fans celebrating the 2023 Supercupa României win at the Ilie Oană Stadium, 8 July 2023.

Being the first team from Covasna County—a county with a majority of ethnic Szeklers/Hungarians—to achieve promotion to the top tier of Romanian football, Sepsi OSK is widely supported among Hungarians. In the 2018–19 season home game attendance fluctuated between 2,000 and 3,500, with an average of 2,682 spectators per game.

The only known organised supporter group of the club is named Székely Légió which is Hungarian for "Szekler Legion". The group traces its origins to the supporters of the defunct Olt Sport Klub from the 1970s. Members of the group are known for showing their support for Sepsi OSK through singing before, during and after the game regardless of the result.

== Honours ==
=== Domestic ===
==== Leagues ====
- Liga II
  - Runners-up (2): 2016–17, 2025–26
- Liga III
  - Winners (1): 2015–16
- Liga IV – Covasna County
  - Winners (1): 2013–14
  - Runners-up (1): 2012–13
- Liga V – Covasna County
  - Winners (1): 2011–12

==== Cups ====
- Cupa României
  - Winners (2): 2021–22, 2022–23
  - Runners-up (1): 2019–20
- Supercupa României
  - Winners (2): 2022, 2023

== Players ==
=== First-team squad ===
As of 3 October 2026

Note: Flags indicate national team as defined under FIFA eligibility rules; some limited exceptions apply. Players may hold more than one non-FIFA nationality.

No.	Pos.	Nation	Player
1	GK	ROU	Mátyás Bartha
2	DF	BRA	Gustavo Cascardo
3	DF	POR	Fábio Vianna
4	DF	FRA	Setigui Karamoko
5	DF	ROU	Bogdan Vătăjelu
6	MF	ROU	Nicolae Păun (Captain)
7	MF	ROU	Robert Silaghi
8	MF	CIV	Aboubakar Keita
9	FW	MNE	Boris Cmiljanić
11	FW	SUI	Dimitri Oberlin
14	FW	NOR	Moses Mawa
16	MF	ROU	Raul Cantauz
17	MF	ROU	Doru Andrei
19	MF	ROU	Giovani Ghimfuș
20	FW	ESP	Nacho Heras

No.	Pos.	Nation	Player
21	DF	ROU	Alin Dobrosavlevici
23	MF	ROU	Hunor Batzula (3rd captain)
24	FW	ROU	Vlad Truță
25	DF	ROU	Bogdan Oteliță
27	MF	ROU	Raul Cîmpean
28	MF	FRA	Victor Daguin
30	MF	ROU	Ákos Nistor
31	DF	MRI	Lindsay Rose
33	GK	ROU	Szilárd Gyenge
44	DF	ROU	David Brădeanu
55	DF	ROU	Gabriel Păcurar
77	MF	CRO	Adnan Aganović (Vice-captain)
82	DF	ROU	Daniel Vîrtej
88	FW	GHA	Carl Davordzie
91	GK	ROU	David Lazar

=== Other players under contract ===
Note: Flags indicate national team as defined under FIFA eligibility rules; some limited exceptions apply. Players may hold more than one non-FIFA nationality.

No.	Pos.	Nation	Player
10	MF	ROU	Cosmin Matei
18	MF	HUN	Dávid Sigér
34	MF	ESP	Dani Iglesias
67	MF	NED	Joeri de Kamps

No.	Pos.	Nation	Player
70	FW	NGR	Funsho Bamgboye
95	GK	ROU	Béla Fejér
—	GK	ROU	Roland Niczuly
—	DF	EST	Joonas Tamm

=== Out on loan ===
Note: Flags indicate national team as defined under FIFA eligibility rules; some limited exceptions apply. Players may hold more than one non-FIFA nationality.

No.	Pos.	Nation	Player
98	GK	ROU	Hunor Gedő (at Săcele until 30 June 2027)
—	GK	ROU	Vlad Tănasă (at Olimpic Zărnești until 30 June 2027)
—	DF	ROU	Radu Ghimbovschi (at Viitorul Onești until 30 June 2027)
—	MF	ROU	Andrei Bartalis (at Săcele until 30 June 2027)
—	MF	ROU	Milán Nikula (at Carpați Covasna until 30 June 2027)

No.	Pos.	Nation	Player
—	MF	ROU	Ottó Székeli (at Carpați Covasna until 30 June 2027)
—	FW	ROU	Levente Dinka (at Săcele until 30 June 2027)
—	FW	ROU	Rareș Marin (at Săcele until 30 June 2027)
—	FW	ROU	Norbert Varga (at KSE Târgu Secuiesc until 30 June 2027)

== Club officials ==
=== Board of directors ===
Role	Name
Owner and president	(Romania) László Diószegi
Vice-president	(Romania) Dávid Kertész
General Director	(Romania) Attila Hadnagy
Technical director	(Romania) Gyula Berecz
Head of Youth Center Development	(Romania) Lóránt Veress
Organizer of Competitions	(Romania) Attila Czine
Chief Scout	(Romania) Endre Mátyás
Delegate	(Romania) Endre Mátyás
Head of Order and Safety	(Romania) Pál Huszti
Press Officer	(Romania) Edit Kiss
Head of Secretary	(Romania) Elvira Török

- Last updated: 8 August 2025

=== Current technical staff ===
Role	Name
Head coach	(Romania) Ovidiu Burcă
Assistant coaches	(Romania) László Kulcsár (Romania) Sorin Colceag
Goalkeeping coac	(Romania) Mihai Barbu
Video Analyst	(Romania) Ákos Kertész
Fitness coaches	(Romania) Bogdan Ungureanu (Romania) Tamás Sánta
Club doctor	(Romania) Gheorghe Popa
Kinetotherapist	(Romania) Gabriel Cojocaru
Masseurs	(Romania) Cătălin Gheța (Romania) Leonard Silișteanu
Storeman	(Romania) Attila Nistor

- Last updated: 8 August 2025

== Records and statistics ==
=== League and cup history ===
Season	Tier	Division	Place	Cupa României	Supercupa României
2026–27	1	Liga I	TBD	TBD	—
2025–26	2	Liga II	**2nd (P)**	Group stage	—
2024–25	1	Liga I	**15th (R)**	Group stage	—
2023–24	1	Liga I	5th	Group stage	—
2022–23	1	Liga I	6th	Winners	Winners
2021–22	1	Liga I	7th	Winners	Winners
2020–21	1	Liga I	4th	Round of 32	—
2019–20	1	Liga I	9th	Runner-up	—

Season	Tier	Division	Place	Cupa României	Supercupa României
2018–19	1	Liga I	6th	Quarter-finals	—
2017–18	1	Liga I	9th	Round of 32	—
2016–17	2	Liga II	**2nd (P)**	Round of 32	—
2015–16	3	Liga III (Seria I)	**1st (P)**	Third round	—
2014–15	3	Liga III (Seria I)	3rd	Third round	—
2013–14	4	Liga IV (CV)	**1st (P)**	County phase	—
2012–13	4	Liga IV (CV)	2nd	County phase	—
2011–12	5	Liga V (CV)	**1st (P)**		—

=== European record ===
Notes

- QR: Qualifying round
- 2QR: Second qualifying round
- 3QR: Third qualifying round

Season	Competition	Round	Club	Home	Away	Agg.
2021–22	UEFA Europa Conference League	2QR	(Slovakia) Spartak Trnava	1–1 (a.e.t.)	0–0	1–1 (3–4 p)
2022–23	UEFA Europa Conference League	2QR	(Slovenia) Olimpija Ljubljana	3–1	0–2 (a.e.t.)	3–3 (4–2 p)
2022–23	UEFA Europa Conference League	3QR	(Sweden) Djurgården	1–3	1–3	2–6
2023–24	UEFA Europa Conference League	2QR	(Bulgaria) CSKA Sofia	4–0	2–0	6–0
2023–24	UEFA Europa Conference League	3QR	(Kazakhstan) Aktobe	1−1	1−0	2−1
2023–24	UEFA Europa Conference League	PO	(Norway) Bodø/Glimt	2−2	2−3 (a.e.t.)	4−5

=== Player records ===
Bold indicates players who play still at the club.

As of 7 November 2026

==== Most appearances ====
Rank	Player	Years	League	Cup	Europe	Other	Total
1	(Romania) **Roland Niczuly**	2016–	269	20	12	3 (Note: Appearance(s) in Liga I European play-offs) (Note: Appearance(s) in Supercupa României)	304
2	(Romania) Marius Ștefănescu	2017–2024	160	20	9	3	192
3	(Croatia) **Adnan Aganović**	2020–2024,2025–	145	16	11	3	175
4	(Romania) **Nicolae Păun**	2019–	138	14	12	3	167
5	(Slovakia) Branislav Niňaj	2021–2025	141	9	8	2	160
6	(Slovakia) Pavol Šafranko	2019–2021,2022–2024	133	14	6	2	155
7	(Romania) Florin Ștefan	2018–2021,2023–2025	141	11	0	0	152
8	(Romania) **Cosmin Matei**	2022–	122	10	9	2	143
9	(Bulgaria) Radoslav Dimitrov	2019–2023	114	13	6	2	135
10	(Romania) Andres Dumitrescu	2020–2023,2024–2025	108	10	9	2	129

==== Top scorers ====
Rank	Player	Years	League	Cup	Europe	Other	Total
1	(Romania) Marius Ștefănescu	2017–2024	31	5	1	0	37
2	(Romania) Attila Hadnagy	2016–2019	33	0	0	0	33
3	(Slovakia) Pavol Šafranko	2019–2021,2022–2024	30	2	0	0	32
4	(Romania) **Cosmin Matei**	2022–	20	3	3	1 (Note: Goal(s) in Supercupa României)	27
5	(Romania) Alexandru Tudorie	2022–2023	18	1	1	0	20
6	(Romania) István Fülöp	2017–2022	16	2	0	0	18
7	(Spain) **Nacho Heras**	2024–	17	1	0	0	18
8	(Romania) **Nicolae Păun**	2022–	10	3	3	0	16
8	(Mali) Ibrahima Tandia	2018–2019	16	0	0	0	16
8	(Romania) Gabriel Vașvari	2018–2022	16	0	0	0	16

== Managers ==
Listed according to when they were appointed manager of Sepsi OSK. (c) means caretaker.

- 2011 (Romania) Ferenc Siklódi
- 2013 (Romania) Valentin Suciu
- 2017 (Romania) Sándor Nagy (c)
- 2017 (Romania) Eugen Neagoe
- 2019 (Romania) Marin Barbu (c)
- 2019 (Hungary) Csaba László
- 2019 (Romania) Leontin Grozavu
- 2021 (Italy) Cristiano Bergodi
- 2023 (Romania) Liviu Ciobotariu
- 2023 (Germany) Bernd Storck
- 2024 (Romania) Valentin Suciu
- 2025 (Romania) Dorinel Munteanu
- 2025 (Hungary) Csaba László (c)
- 2025 (Romania) Ovidiu Burcă

== Notable former players ==
The footballers enlisted below have had at least 50 league appearances for Sepsi OSK or they have had international cap(s) for their respective countries at senior level and at least 20 league appearances for Sepsi OSK.

Romania

- (Romania) Mihai Bălașa
- (Romania) Denis Ciobotariu
- (Romania) Andres Dumitrescu
- (Romania) István Fülöp
- (Romania) Ion Gheorghe
- (Romania) Cătălin Golofca
- (Romania) Attila Hadnagy
- (Romania) Denis Haruț
- (Romania) Bogdan Mitrea
- (Romania) Darius Oroian
- (Romania) Claudiu Petrila
- (Romania) Florin Ștefan
- (Romania) Marius Ștefănescu
- (Romania) Răzvan Tincu
- (Romania) Alexandru Tudorie
- (Romania) Ionuț Ursu
- (Romania) Gabriel Vașvari

Albania

- (Albania) Sherif Kallaku

Algeria

- (Algeria) Rachid Bouhenna

Argentina

- (Argentina) Jonathan Rodríguez

Bulgaria

- (Bulgaria) Radoslav Dimitrov
- (Bulgaria) Stefan Velev

Costa Rica

- (Costa Rica) Dylan Flores

Guinea

- (Guinea) Boubacar Fofana

Hungary

- (Hungary) Ákos Kecskés
- (Hungary) Márk Tamás
- (Hungary) Kevin Varga
- (Hungary) Roland Varga

Ivory Coast

- (Ivory Coast) Ousmane Viera

Mali

- (Mali) Ibrahima Tandia

Moldova

- (Moldova) Vitalie Damaşcan

Netherlands

- (Netherlands) Anass Achahbar

North Macedonia

- (North Macedonia) Isnik Alimi
- (North Macedonia) Stefan Ashkovski
- (North Macedonia) Marko Simonovski

Philippines

- (Philippines) Daisuke Sato

Serbia

- (Serbia) Mihajlo Nešković

Slovakia

- (Slovakia) Branislav Niňaj
- (Slovakia) Pavol Šafranko

Spain

- (Spain) Eder González

Sudan

- (Sudan) Yasin Hamed

Switzerland

- (Switzerland) Goran Karanović

Venezuela

- (Venezuela) Mario Rondón
