= Jonathan Rodríguez (footballer, born 1990) =

Argentine professional footballer

Personal information
- Full name: Jonathan Emanuel Rodríguez
- Date of birth: 7 June 1990 (age 36)
- Place of birth: Lomas de Zamora, Argentina
- Height: 1.73 m (5 ft 8 in)
- Position: Midfielder

Team information
- Current team: Metaloglobus București

Senior career*
Years	Team	Apps	(Gls)
2008–2009	San Martín de Burzaco	22	(1)
2011–2014	Defensores de Belgrano	21	(0)
2014–2015	C.A.I.	14	(0)
2015–2016	Deportivo Madryn	39	(1)
2016–2017	Agropecuario	32	(3)
2017–2021	Botoșani	117	(8)
2021–2022	CFR Cluj	5	(0)
2022	→ Dinamo București (loan)	15	(0)
2022–2024	Sepsi OSK	46	(0)
2024–2025	Concordia Chiajna	8	(0)
2025	River Plate Montevideo	6	(0)
2026–	Metaloglobus București	0	(0)
- * Club domestic league appearances and goals as of 15 August 2026

Jonathan Emanuel Rodríguez (born 7 June 1990) is an Argentine professional footballer who plays as a midfielder for Liga II club Metaloglobus București.

== Career ==
Rodríguez spent the first part of his career in Argentina's lower leagues, where he represented San Martín de Burzaco, Defensores de Belgrano, CAI, Deportivo Madryn and Agropecuario. He moved abroad for the first time in the summer of 2017, aged 27, joining Botoșani in Romania.

Rodríguez was called to the Liga I Team of the Year in the 2019–20 season and was made captain at the club. He played 126 games and scored ten goals in all competitions over the course of four campaigns. He then signed for fellow league team CFR Cluj as a free agent in June 2021.

== Honours ==
Agropecuario

- Torneo Federal A: 2016–17

CFR Cluj

- Liga I: 2021–22
- Supercupa României runner-up: 2021

Sepsi OSK

- Cupa României: 2022–23
- Supercupa României: 2022, 2023

Individual

- Liga I Team of the Season: 2019–20
