= Ely Fernandes =

Cape Verdean professional footballer

Ely
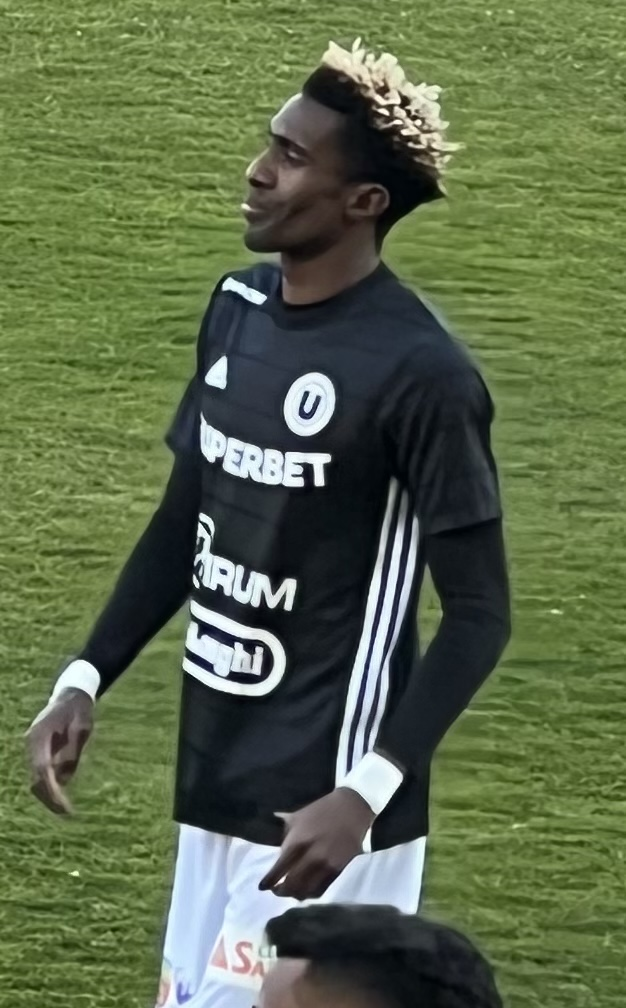
- Ely with Universitatea Cluj in 2022

Personal information
- Full name: Ely Ernesto Lopes Fernandes
- Date of birth: 4 November 1990 (age 36)
- Place of birth: Tarrafal, Cape Verde
- Height: 1.87 m (6 ft 2 in)
- Position: Forward

Senior career*
Years	Team	Apps	(Gls)
2009–2010	SL Marinha	28	(13)
2011–2012	Marinhense	24	(10)
2012	Infesta	8	(2)
2013	Fátima	19	(5)
2013–2015	Gil Vicente	3	(0)
2013–2014	→ UD Oliveirense (loan)	32	(4)
2014–2015	→ Santa Clara (loan)	27	(2)
2015–2017	Vilafranquense	21	(2)
2017	Pinhalnovense	12	(6)
2018–2020	Gaz Metan Mediaș	71	(8)
2020–2021	Viitorul Constanța	18	(1)
2021–2022	Farul Constanța	9	(0)
2022–2023	Universitatea Cluj	28	(5)
2025	Afumați	3	(0)
2025–2026	Metaloglobus București	27	(3)
- * Club domestic league appearances and goals as of 18 May 2026

Ely Ernesto Lopes Fernandes (born 4 November 1990), commonly known as Ely, is a Cape Verdean professional footballer who plays as a forward.

== Career ==
Ely made his professional debut in the Segunda Liga for UD Oliveirense on 14 September 2013, in a 3–2 win against Tondela.

== Honours ==
UD Vilafranquense

- Portuguese District Championships – Lisbon FA Pró-National Division: 2015–16

Universitatea Cluj

- Cupa României runner-up: 2022–23
