= 2018–19 FC Dunărea Călărași season =

Dunărea Călărași
2018–19 season
- Chairman: Florentin Brișan
- Manager: Dan Alexa
- Stadium: Ion Comșa
- Cupa României: Quarter-finals
| Home colours | Away colours |

The 2018–19 season was the 57th season of competitive football by Dunărea Călărași, and their first ever in Liga I. Dunărea Călărași competed in the Liga I and in Cupa României.

== Previous season positions ==
| | Competition | Position |
|---|---|---|
| (Romania) | Liga II | 1st |
| (Romania) | Cupa României | Fourth Round |

== Players ==
=== Transfers ===
==== In ====
| Date | Pos. | Player | Age | Moving from | Fee | Notes | Source |
|---|---|---|---|---|---|---|---|
| 7 June 2018 | FW | (Senegal) Mediop Ndiaye | 27 | (Romania) Ripensia Timişoara | Undisclosed | Signed for three years. | |
| 13 June 2018 | MID | (Spain) Aitor Monroy | 30 | (Romania) Dinamo București | Undisclosed | Signed for one year. | |
| 17 June 2018 | DF | (North Macedonia) Filip Gligorov | 24 | (North Macedonia) Sileks | Undisclosed | Signed for two years. | |
| 20 June 2018 | MID | (Romania) Georgian Honciu | 29 | (Romania) Șirineasa | Undisclosed | Signed for two years. | |
| 22 June 2018 | MID | (Romania) Stelian Cucu | 28 | (Romania) Botoșani | Undisclosed | Signed for one year. | |
| 22 June 2018 | GK | (Romania) Cătălin Straton | 28 | (Romania) ACS Poli Timișoara | Undisclosed | Signed for one year. | |
| 22 June 2018 | DF | (Romania) Alin Şeroni | 31 | (Romania) ACS Poli Timișoara | Undisclosed | Signed for one year. | |
| 4 July 2018 | MID | (France) Hamidou Keyta | 23 | (France) Chambly | Undisclosed | Signed for two years. | |
| 11 July 2018 | DF | (Romania) Ionuț Balaur | 29 | (Romania) FC Voluntari | Undisclosed | Signed for two years. | |

==== Loans in ====
| Date | Pos. | Player | Age | Moving from | Fee | Notes | Source |
|---|---|---|---|---|---|---|---|
| 22 June 2018 | MD | (Romania) Lucian Buzan | 19 | (Romania) Universitatea Craiova | – | Signed a season-long loan. | |
| 9 July 2018 | MD | (Romania) Gabriel Simion | 20 | (Romania) FCSB | – | Signed a season-long loan. | |

==== Out ====
| Date | Pos. | Player | Age | Moving to | Fee | Notes | Source |

==== Loans out ====
| Date | Pos. | Player | Age | Moving to | Fee | Notes | Source |

== Competitions ==
Win Draw Loss

=== Liga I ===
The Liga I fixture list was announced on 5 July 2018.

==== Regular season ====
===== Table =====
| Pos | Team | Pld | W | D | L | GF | GA | GD | Pts | Qualification |
|---|---|---|---|---|---|---|---|---|---|---|
| 10 | Hermannstadt | 26 | 9 | 5 | 12 | 25 | 28 | −3 | 32 | Qualification for the Relegation round |
| 11 | Gaz Metan Mediaș | 26 | 7 | 10 | 9 | 25 | 32 | −7 | 31 | Qualification for the Relegation round |
| 12 | Dunărea Călărași | 26 | 4 | 12 | 10 | 16 | 25 | −9 | 24 | Qualification for the Relegation round |
| 13 | Voluntari | 26 | 4 | 9 | 13 | 30 | 46 | −16 | 21 | Qualification for the Relegation round |
| 14 | Concordia Chiajna | 26 | 4 | 6 | 16 | 19 | 45 | −26 | 18 | Qualification for the Relegation round |

Source: LPF (in Romanian), Soccerway
Rules for classification: 1) Points; 2) Head-to-head points; 3) Head-to-head goal difference; 4) Head-to-head goals scored; 5) Goal difference; 6) Goals scored; 7) Play-off.

===== Results summary =====
| Overall | | | | | | | | Home | | | | | | Away | | | | | |
| Pld | W | D | L | GF | GA | GD | Pts | W | D | L | GF | GA | GD | W | D | L | GF | GA | GD |
|---|---|---|---|---|---|---|---|---|---|---|---|---|---|---|---|---|---|---|---|
| 26 | 4 | 12 | 10 | 16 | 25 | −9 | 24 | 3 | 5 | 5 | 11 | 15 | −4 | 1 | 7 | 5 | 5 | 10 | −5 |

Last updated: 2 March 2019.
Source: Liga I

===== Results by round =====
| Round | 1 | 2 | 3 | 4 | 5 | 6 | 7 | 8 | 9 | 10 | 11 | 12 | 13 | 14 | 15 | 16 | 17 | 18 | 19 | 20 | 21 | 22 | 23 | 24 | 25 | 26 | 27 | 28 | 29 | 30 | 31 | 32 | 33 | 34 | 35 | 36 | 37 | 38 |
|---|---|---|---|---|---|---|---|---|---|---|---|---|---|---|---|---|---|---|---|---|---|---|---|---|---|---|---|---|---|---|---|---|---|---|---|---|---|---|
| Ground | A | H | A | H | A | H | A | H | A | A | H | A | H | H | A | H | A | H | A | H | A | H | H | A | H | A | | | | | | | | | | | | |
| Result | W | D | D | L | D | W | L | W | L | D | D | D | D | L | D | L | L | L | L | L | L | D | W | D | D | D | | | | | | | | | | | | |

Updated to match(es) played on 2 March 2019. Source: Liga I
A = Away; H = Home; W = Win; D = Draw; L = Loss

===== Matches =====
Win Draw Loss

| 22 July 2018 1 | Viitorul Constanța | 0–1 | Dunărea Călărași | Ovidiu |
| 18:00 EEST (UTC+3) | S.Mladen (yellow card) 3'; T.Băluță (yellow card) 39' (yellow-red card) 83'; I.Hagi 45' | Report | Honciu 5'; Straton (yellow card) 44' | Stadium: Viitorul; Attendance: 3,500; Referee: Lucian Ruşandu |

| 28 July 2018 2 | Dunărea Călărași | 0–0 | CFR Cluj | Călărași |
| 18:00 EEST (UTC+3) | D.Ispas (yellow card) 21'; B.Șandru (yellow card) 42'; Monroy (yellow card) 90+2' | Report | Culio (yellow card) 38'; C.Manea (yellow card) 62'; Țucudean (yellow card) 84' | Stadium: Ion Comșa; Attendance: 7,300; Referee: Marius Avram |

| 5 August 2018 3 | Hermannstadt | 1–1 | Dunărea Călărași | Târgu Mureș |
| 18:00 EEST (UTC+3) | Blănaru 24'; I.Antonov (yellow card) 90' | Report | Dobrosavlevici 90+1' | Stadium: Trans-Sil; Attendance: 200; Referee: Iulian Dima |

| 12 August 2018 4 | Dunărea Călărași | 1–3 | Universitatea Craiova | Călărași |
| 15:30 EEST (UTC+3) | C.N.Pușcaș (yellow card) 7'; Ndiaye 63' | Report | Kelić (yellow card) 5'; Fedele 45'; A.Mitriță 53' (pen.), 73'; Cicâldău (yellow card) 67' | Stadium: Ion Comșa; Attendance: 7,530; Referee: Ovidiu Hațegan |

| 18 August 2018 5 | Astra Giurgiu | 1–1 | Dunărea Călărași | Giurgiu |
| 18:00 EEST (UTC+3) | N.Roșu 17' (pen.) (yellow card) 65'; Bègue (yellow card) 30'; Alibec (yellow card) 64' (yellow-red card) 74'; R.Crișan (yellow card) 67' | Report | D.Ispas (yellow card) 16'; Pană 22' (yellow card) 36'; G.Simion (yellow card) 49'; Gligorov (yellow card) 52'; C.N.Pușcaș (yellow card) 64' | Stadium: Marin Anastasovici; Attendance: 200; Referee: Cătălin Ion Buşi |

| 25 August 2018 6 | Dunărea Călărași | 2–0 | Politehnica Iași | Călărași |
| 18:00 EEST (UTC+3) | D.Ispas (yellow card) 4'; Pană (yellow card) 51'; V.Alexandru 56'; Kanda 80'; Dobrosavlevici (yellow card) 89' | Report | Frăsinescu (yellow card) 7'; Cioinac (yellow card) 21' (yellow-red card) 45+1' | Stadium: Ion Comșa; Attendance: 3,200; Referee: Iulian Călin |

| 31 August 2018 7 | Sepsi Sfântu Gheorghe | 1–0 | Dunărea Călărași | Sfântu Gheorghe |
| 19:30 EEST (UTC+3) | Simonovski 3' (yellow card) 41'; S.Drăghici (yellow card) 90+4' | Report | G.Simion (yellow card) 28'; V.Alexandru (yellow card) 45'; Dobrosavlevici (yellow card) 51'; D.Ispas (yellow card) 73' | Stadium: Municipal; Attendance: 3,500; Referee: Sorin Andrei Antonie |

| 15 September 2018 8 | Dunărea Călărași | 3–2 | FC Botoșani | Călărași |
| 15:00 EEST (UTC+3) | G.Simion (yellow card) 10'; Pană 21'; Kanda 29'; Dobrosavlevici 37' (yellow card) 49'; Ndiaye 84'; Straton (yellow card) 90+4' | Report | J.Rodríguez 12' (pen.), 51' (pen.); R.Oaidă (yellow card) 18' | Stadium: Ion Comșa; Attendance: 3,000; Referee: Cătălin Popa |

| 23 September 2018 9 | FCSB | 2–0 | Dunărea Călărași | Voluntari |
| 21:00 EEST (UTC+3) | Man 8'; F.Tănase 45' (pen.) | Report | Keyta (yellow card) 18'; Kanda (yellow card) 56'; D.Ispas (yellow card) 60'; Dobrosavlevici (yellow card) 74'; S.Cucu (yellow card) 86' | Stadium: Anghel Iordănescu; Attendance: 700; Referee: Ionuţ Coza |

| 1 October 2018 10 | Concordia Chiajna | 1–1 | Dunărea Călărași | Chiajna |
| 18:00 EEST (UTC+3) | Prepeliță 60' | Report | C.N.Pușcaș (yellow card) 41'; Keyta 44' (pen.); B.Șandru (yellow card) 90+3'; S.Cucu (yellow card) 90' | Stadium: Concordia; Attendance: 150; Referee: Horia Gabriel Mladinovici |

| 7 October 2018 11 | Dunărea Călărași | 1–1 | FC Voluntari | Călărași |
| 14:00 EEST (UTC+3) | Ndiaye 34' (yellow card) 84'; Walace (yellow card) 42' | Report | Răuță (yellow card) 7'; Balaur (yellow card) 22'; Ricardinho 79' | Stadium: Ion Comșa; Attendance: 2,840; Referee: Marius Avram |

| 22 October 2018 12 | Dinamo București | 1–1 | Dunărea Călărași | Bucharest |
| 21:00 EEST (UTC+3) | D.Sorescu (yellow card) 46'; D.Popa 56'; Hanca (yellow card) 58' | Report | Pană (yellow card) 21'; Ndiaye 22'; Honciu (yellow card) 37'; D.Ispas (yellow card) 53'; Carnat (yellow card) 78'; A.Munteanu (yellow card) 90+2' (red card) 90+2' | Stadium: Dinamo; Attendance: 2,710; Referee: Alexandru Tudor (Bucharest) |

| 28 October 2018 13 | Dunărea Călărași | 0–0 | Gaz Metan Mediaș | Călărași |
| 14:00 EET (UTC+2) | Dobrosavlevici (yellow card) 60' | Report | Fofana (yellow card) 40'; Nasser Chamed (yellow card) 68'; V.Crețu (yellow card) 90+4' | Stadium: Ion Comșa; Attendance: 2,550; Referee: George Cătălin Găman |

| 4 November 2018 14 | Dunărea Călărași | 0–1 | Viitorul Constanța | Călărași |
| 16:00 EET (UTC+2) | Șeroni (yellow card) 41'; Dobrosavlevici (yellow card) 90+2' | Report | D.Drăguș (yellow card) 45' (goal) 88'; T.Băluță (yellow card) 84'; S.Mladen (yellow card) 90+3' | Stadium: Ion Comșa; Attendance: 4,130; Referee: Iulian Călin |

| 10 November 2018 15 | CFR Cluj | 0–0 | Dunărea Călărași | Cluj-Napoca |
| 21:00 EET (UTC+2) | Culio (yellow card) 90+6' | Report | Gligorov (yellow card) 55'; S.Cucu (yellow card) 64'; Straton (yellow card) 90+4' | Stadium: Dr. Constantin Rădulescu; Attendance: 2,500; Referee: Marcel Bîrsan (Bucharest) |

| 25 November 2018 16 | Dunărea Călărași | 0–1 | Hermannstadt | Călărași |
| 13:30 EET (UTC+2) | G.Mendy (yellow card) 31'; Dobrosavlevici (yellow card) 45+5' | Report | C.Pîrvulescu (yellow card) 29'; Dâlbea (yellow card) 53'; L.M.Dumitriu (yellow card) 67' (goal) 90+4' | Stadium: Ion Comșa; Attendance: 1,500; Referee: Adrian Viorel Cojocaru |

| 2 December 2018 17 | Universitatea Craiova | 1–0 | Dunărea Călărași | Craiova |
| 17:00 EET (UTC+2) | Mateiu 23'; Bancu (yellow card) 34'; Pigliacelli (yellow card) 57'; Donkor (yellow card) 64'; A.Mitriță (yellow card) 69'; Cicâldău (yellow card) 82'; Koljić (yellow card) 90+2' | Report | Ndiaye (yellow card) 60'; Gligorov (yellow card) 87' | Stadium: Ion Oblemenco; Attendance: 7,000; Referee: Andrei Chivulete |

| 6 December 2018 18 | Dunărea Călărași | 1–2 | Astra Giurgiu | Călărași |
| 14:00 EET (UTC+2) | Ndiaye 71' | Report | Mrzljak 11' (yellow card) 90+2'; Bègue 18'; Zoua (yellow card) 57' | Stadium: Ion Comșa; Attendance: 1,500; Referee: Alexandru Tudor (Bucharest) |

| 9 December 2018 19 | Politehnica Iași | 1–0 | Dunărea Călărași | Iași |
| 14:00 EET (UTC+2) | Platini 33'; M.Sanoh (yellow card) 48' | Report | | Stadium: Emil Alexandrescu; Attendance: 1,500; Referee: George Rădulescu |

| 16 December 2018 20 | Dunărea Călărași | 0–3 | Sepsi Sfântu Gheorghe | Călărași |
| 14:00 EET (UTC+2) | G.Simion (yellow card) 49'; Dobrosavlevici (yellow card) 82' | Report | Nouvier 18' (yellow card) 72'; Tandia (yellow card) 22'; A.Rus (yellow card) 45+1'; Simonovski 53', 57' | Stadium: Ion Comșa; Attendance: 1,000; Referee: Ovidiu Hațegan |

| 20 December 2018 21 | FC Botoșani | 1–0 | Dunărea Călărași | Botoșani |
| 17:30 EET (UTC+2) | Ongenda 36'; Patache (yellow card) 68' | Report | G.Mendy (yellow card) 65' | Stadium: Municipal; Attendance: 300; Referee: Iulian Călin |

| 2 February 2019 22 | Dunărea Călărași | 1–1 | FCSB | Călărași |
| EET (UTC+2) | | | | Stadium: Ion Comșa |

| 10 February 2019 23 | Dunărea Călărași | 2–1 | Concordia Chiajna | Călărași |
| EET (UTC+2) | | | | Stadium: Ion Comșa |

| 17 February 2019 24 | FC Voluntari | 0–0 | Dunărea Călărași | Voluntari |
| 15:00 EET (UTC+2) | Armaș (yellow card) 19'; Krasniqi (yellow card) 80' | Report | Vlădoiu (yellow card) 10' | Stadium: Anghel Iordănescu; Attendance: 600; Referee: Andrei Chivulete |

| 24 February 2019 25 | Dunărea Călărași | 0–0 | Dinamo București | Călărași |
| 14:00 EET (UTC+2) | | Report | | Stadium: Ion Comșa; Attendance: 3,500; Referee: Ionu Coza |

| 2 March 2019 26 | Gaz Metan Mediaș | 0–0 | Dunărea Călărași | Mediaș |
| 13:00 EET (UTC+2) | David Caiado (yellow card) 58'; Luís Aurélio (yellow card) 83' | Report | Ștefan Vlădoiu (yellow card) 1'; Ndiaye (yellow card) 55'; Bourceanu (yellow card) 90+2' | Stadium: Gaz Metan; Attendance: 1,000; Referee: Lucian Ruşandu |

==== Relegation round ====
===== Table =====
| Pos | Team | Pld | W | D | L | GF | GA | GD | Pts | Qualification or relegation |
|---|---|---|---|---|---|---|---|---|---|---|
| 7 | Gaz Metan Mediaș | 14 | 10 | 2 | 2 | 25 | 9 | +16 | 48 | |
| 8 | Botoșani | 14 | 8 | 2 | 4 | 18 | 9 | +9 | 44 | |
| 9 | Dinamo București | 14 | 8 | 3 | 3 | 16 | 7 | +9 | 43 | |
| 10 | Politehnica Iași | 14 | 3 | 5 | 6 | 12 | 18 | −6 | 31 | |
| 11 | Voluntari | 14 | 5 | 5 | 4 | 14 | 16 | −2 | 31 | |
| 12 | Hermannstadt (O) | 14 | 2 | 5 | 7 | 9 | 19 | −10 | 27 | Qualification for the relegation play-offs |
| 13 | Dunărea Călărași (R) | 14 | 3 | 4 | 7 | 8 | 18 | −10 | 25 | Relegation to Liga II |
| 14 | Concordia Chiajna (R) | 14 | 2 | 4 | 8 | 17 | 23 | −6 | 19 | Relegation to Liga II |

Source: Soccerway
Rules for classification: 1) Points; 2) Points without rounding; 3) Head-to-head points; 4) Head-to-head goal difference; 5) Head-to-head goals scored; 6) Goal difference; 7) Goals scored; 8) Play-off (only if needed to decide teams for relegation). (Note: only criteria 6 and 7 are applied to establish the classification during the competition.)
(O) Play-off winners; (R) Relegated

===== Results summary =====
| Overall | | | | | | | | Home | | | | | | Away | | | | | |
| Pld | W | D | L | GF | GA | GD | Pts | W | D | L | GF | GA | GD | W | D | L | GF | GA | GD |
|---|---|---|---|---|---|---|---|---|---|---|---|---|---|---|---|---|---|---|---|
| 14 | 3 | 4 | 7 | 8 | 18 | −10 | 13 | 2 | 2 | 3 | 5 | 6 | −1 | 1 | 2 | 4 | 3 | 12 | −9 |

Last updated: 2 June 2019.
Source: Liga I

===== Position by round =====
| Round | 1 | 2 | 3 | 4 | 5 | 6 | 7 | 8 | 9 | 10 | 11 | 12 | 13 | 14 |
|---|---|---|---|---|---|---|---|---|---|---|---|---|---|---|
| Ground | A | H | A | H | A | A | H | H | A | H | A | H | H | A |
| Result | L | L | W | D | L | D | D | W | L | L | D | W | L | L |
| Position | 13 | 13 | 13 | 13 | 13 | 13 | 13 | 12 | 13 | 13 | 13 | 12 | 12 | 13 |

Updated to match(es) played on 2 June 2019. Source: Liga I
A = Away; H = Home; W = Win; D = Draw; L = Loss

===== Matches =====
Win Draw Loss

| 8 March 2019 1 | Dinamo București | 2–0 | Dunărea Călărași | Bucharest |
| | Nistor 24'; Zenke (yellow card) 70'; Popa (yellow card) 82'; Montini 90+4' | Report | Filip (yellow card) 71'; Iancu (yellow card) 84' | Stadium: Dinamo; Attendance: 963; Referee: Marius Avram |

| 16 March 2019 2 | Dunărea Călărași | 1–2 | Politehnica Iași | Călărași |
| | Iancu 69' | Report | Mihalache (yellow card) 59'; Gardoș (yellow card) 79' (goal) 87'; Platini 81' | Stadium: Ion Comșa; Attendance: 1,500; Referee: George Găman |

| 1 April 2019 3 | Botoșani | 1–2 | Dunărea Călărași | Botoșani |
| | Buș 7'; Fülöp (yellow card) 45'; Roman (yellow card) 80'; Fabbrini (yellow card) 90+2'; Ongenda (yellow card) 90+6'; Pap (yellow card) 90+6' | Report | Iancu 33'; Souda (yellow card) 42'; Mendy (yellow card) 49'; Ammari 57'; Dobrosavlevici (yellow card) 65' (yellow-red card) 87'; Luchin (yellow card) 90+2'; Ndiaye (yellow card) 90+4'; Keyta (yellow card) 90+6' | Stadium: Municipal; Attendance: 1,500; Referee: Adrian Cojocaru |

| 6 April 2019 4 | Dunărea Călărași | 1–1 | Voluntari | Călărași |
| | Ben Djemia (yellow card) 29'; Souda (yellow card) 41'; Simion (yellow card) 45+3'; Ammari (yellow card) 52'; Sîrghi (yellow card) 73' (yellow-red card) 88'; Benzar 76'; Straton (yellow card) 90+3' | report | Răuță (yellow card) 10'; Signorelli (yellow card) 61'; Armaș 90+3'; Deac (yellow card) 90+5' | Stadium: Ion Comșa; Attendance: 1,000; Referee: István Kovács (referee) |

| 12 April 2019 5 | Concordia Chiajna | 3–0 | Dunărea Călărași | Chiajna |
| | Marc (yellow card) 21' (goal) 45+1'; Dobrosavlevici 27' (o.g.); Nivaldo 69'; Koutroumpis (yellow card) 86' | Report | | Stadium: Concordia; Attendance: 485; Referee: Horaiu Fesnic |

| 21 April 2019 6 | Gaz Metan Mediaș | 0–0 | Dunărea Călărași | Mediaș |
| | Ivanov (yellow card) 44'; Chamed (yellow card) 60' | Report | Filip (yellow card) 48' | Stadium: Gaz Metan; Attendance: 1,000; Referee: Sorin Antonie |

| 27 April 2019 7 | Dunărea Călărași | 0–0 | Hermannstadt | Călărași |
| | Filip (yellow card) 20' | Report | Petrescu (yellow card) 65' | Stadium: Ion Comșa; Attendance: 1,700; Referee: Ovidiu Hațegan |

| 4 May 2019 8 | Dunărea Călărași | 1–0 | Dinamo București | Călărași |
| | Luchin (yellow card) 43'; Dobrosavlevici (yellow card) 59'; Ammari 70' (yellow card) 70'; Simion (yellow card) 76'; Enache (red card) 82'; Benzar (yellow card) 90+1'; Straton (yellow card) 90+3' | Report | N'Diaye (yellow card) 75'; Dussaut (yellow card) 79'; Grigore (red card) 82'; Aliji (yellow card) 83' | Stadium: Ion Comșa; Attendance: 3,500; Referee: Marcel Bîrsan |

| 11 May 2019 9 | Politehnica Iași | 4–0 | Dunărea Călărași | Iași |
| | Platini 39'; João Teixeira 71' (pen.); Cioinac 73'; Petre (yellow card) 86' (goal) 90+2' | Report | Ammari (yellow card) 44'; Souda (yellow card) 46'; Benzar (yellow card) 61'; Keyta (yellow card) 85' | Stadium: Emil Alexandrescu; Attendance: 1,500; Referee: (Romania) Radu Petrescu |

| 14 May 2019 10 | Dunărea Călărași | 0–2 | Botoșani | Călărași |
| | Iancu (yellow card) 33'; Luchin (yellow card) 45'; Ammari (yellow card) 84' | Report | Fülöp 29' (pen.) (yellow card) 79'; Golofca 45'; Roman (yellow card) 69'; Buș (yellow card) 86'; Fraisl (yellow card) 89'; Burcă (yellow card) 90+3' | Stadium: Ion Comșa; Attendance: 1,000; Referee: (Romania) István Kovács (referee) |

| 19 May 2019 11 | Voluntari | 0–0 | Dunărea Călărași | Voluntari |
| | Bălan (yellow card) 58' | Report | Honciu (yellow card) 28'; Souda (yellow card) 70' | Stadium: Anghel Iordănescu; Attendance: 1,000; Referee: (Romania) Horaiu Fesnic |

| 22 May 2019 12 | Dunărea Călărași | 2–0 | Concordia Chiajna | Călărași |
| | Mendy (yellow card) 52'; Luchin 76'; Bourceanu (yellow card) 80'; Ammari 90+4' (yellow card) 90+5' | Report | Moussa (yellow card) 45+1' (yellow-red card) 87'; Ropotan (yellow card) 52'; Cadamuro (yellow card) 73'; Gorobsov (yellow card) 90' | Stadium: Ion Comșa; Attendance: 1,500; Referee: (Romania) Marcel Bîrsan |

| 26 May 2019 13 | Dunărea Călărași | 0–1 | Gaz Metan Mediaș | Călărași |
| | Bourceanu (yellow card) 33'; Iancu (yellow card) 54' (yellow-red card) 77'; Ammari (yellow card) 57' | [https://us.soccerway.com/matches/2019/05/26/romania/liga-i/sc-fc-dunarea-calarasi/gaz-metan-medias/2994858/ Report[ | Rondón (yellow card) 10'; André Micael (yellow card) 21'; Ivanov (yellow card) 59'; Bușu (yellow card) 73'; Yazalde 87' | Stadium: Ion Comșa; Attendance: 1,500; Referee: (Romania) Sebastian Colțescu |

| 2 June 2019 14 | Hermannstadt | 2–1 | Dunărea Călărași | Sibiu |
| | Tsoumou 85'; Blănaru (red card) 90+2'; Lendrić 90+6'; Popovici (yellow card) 90+8' | Report | Enache (yellow card) 53'; Gligorov (yellow card) 57'; Bourceanu (yellow card) 58'; Filip 77' (yellow card) 90+2'; Honciu (yellow card) 81'; Dobrosavlevici (yellow card) 82' | Stadium: Municipal; Attendance: 4,500; Referee: (Romania) Ovidiu Hațegan |

=== Cupa României ===
| 26 September 2018 Round of 32 | Slatina | 0–2 | Dunărea Călărași | Slatina |
| | | | | Stadium: 1 Mai |

| 1 November 2018 Round of 16 | Dunărea Călărași | 2–1 | FCSB | Călărași |
| | | | | Stadium: Ion Comșa |

| 27 February 2019 Quarterfinal | Dunărea Călărași | 1–2 | Astra Giurgiu | Călărași |
| | | | | Stadium: Ion Comșa |

== See also ==
- 2018–19 Cupa României
- 2018–19 Liga I
