= 2018–19 FC Politehnica Iași (2010) season =

Politehnica Iași
2018–19 season
- Chairman: Adrian Ambrosie
- Manager: Flavius Stoican
- Stadium: Emil Alexandrescu
- Cupa României: Round of 32
Home colours	Away colours

The 2018–19 season will be the 9th season of competitive football by Politehnica Iași, and the 5th consecutive in Liga I. Politehnica Iași will compete in the Liga I and in Cupa României.

== Previous season positions ==
	Competition	Position
(Romania)	Liga I	6th
(Romania)	Cupa României	Quarter-finals

== Competitions ==
Win Draw Loss

=== Liga I ===
The Liga I fixture list was announced on 5 July 2018.

==== Regular season ====
===== Table =====
Pos	Team	Pld	W	D	L	GF	GA	GD	Pts	Qualification
6	Sepsi OSK	26	10	7	9	32	25	+7	37	Qualification for the Championship round
7	Botoșani	26	9	9	8	31	33	−2	36	Qualification for the Relegation round
8	Politehnica Iași	26	10	4	12	28	38	−10	34	Qualification for the Relegation round
9	Dinamo București	26	8	8	10	29	37	−8	32	Qualification for the Relegation round
10	Hermannstadt	26	9	5	12	25	28	−3	32	Qualification for the Relegation round

Source: LPF (in Romanian), Soccerway
Rules for classification: 1) Points; 2) Head-to-head points; 3) Head-to-head goal difference; 4) Head-to-head goals scored; 5) Goal difference; 6) Goals scored; 7) Play-off.

===== Results summary =====
Overall								Home						Away					
Pld	W	D	L	GF	GA	GD	Pts	W	D	L	GF	GA	GD	W	D	L	GF	GA	GD
21	8	4	9	26	32	−6	28	4	3	4	13	14	−1	4	1	5	13	18	−5

Last updated: 8 January 2019.
Source: Liga I

===== Matches =====
Win Draw Loss

23 July 2018 1	Universitatea Craiova	0–0	Politehnica Iași	Craiova
21:00 EEST (UTC+3)		Report	M.Chelaru (yellow card) 16'; Cioinac (yellow card) 39'; Panțîru (yellow card) 69'; D.Rusu (yellow card) 82'	Stadium: Ion Oblemenco; Attendance: 12,000; Referee: Horațiu Feșnic (Cluj)

28 July 2018 2	Politehnica Iași	1–1	Astra Giurgiu	Iași
21:00 EEST (UTC+3)	O.Mihalache (yellow card) 37'; Frăsinescu 60' (yellow card) 78'; Cioinac (yellow card) 66'; D.Flores (yellow card) 73'	Report	Mrzljak (yellow card) 36'; L.Buş (yellow card) 37'; Iliev (yellow card) 56'; Bejan (yellow card) 58'; Llullaku 81' (pen.)	Stadium: Emil Alexandrescu; Attendance: 4,000; Referee: Cătălin Popa

5 August 2018 3	FCSB	4–0	Politehnica Iași	Bucharest
21:00 EEST (UTC+3)	Gnohéré 24', 58'; M.Momčilović (yellow card) 85'; Man 86'; O.Moruțan 90+3'	Report	Cioinac (yellow card) 35'; O.Mihalache (yellow card) 56'	Stadium: Arena Națională; Attendance: 3,784; Referee: Radu Petrescu

11 August 2018 4	Sepsi Sfântu Gheorghe	3–0	Politehnica Iași	Sfântu Gheorghe
21:00 EEST (UTC+3)	O.Viera 30'; J.Mensah (yellow card) 44'; St.Velev 56'; Niczuly (yellow card) 77'; Y.Hamed 78'	Report	D.Flores (yellow card) 18'; Frăsinescu (yellow card) 53'	Stadium: Municipal; Attendance: 3,000; Referee: Andrei Chivulete

17 August 2018 5	Politehnica Iași	2–1	FC Botoșani	Iași
21:00 EEST (UTC+3)	M.Chelaru (yellow card) 28'; A.Cristea 31', 35'; D.Rusu (yellow card) 85'; O.Mihalache (yellow card) 90+2'	Report	Brekalo (yellow card) 54'; M.A.Roman 55'	Stadium: Emil Alexandrescu; Attendance: 4,000; Referee: George Cătălin Găman

25 August 2018 6	Dunărea Călărași	2–0	Politehnica Iași	Călărași
18:00 EEST (UTC+3)	D.Ispas (yellow card) 4'; Pană (yellow card) 51'; V.Alexandru 56'; Kanda 80'; Dobrosavlevici (yellow card) 89'	Report	Frăsinescu (yellow card) 7'; Cioinac (yellow card) 21' (yellow-red card) 45+1'	Stadium: Ion Comșa; Attendance: 3,200; Referee: Iulian Călin

3 September 2018 7	Politehnica Iași	3–0	Concordia Chiajna	Iași
21:00 EEST (UTC+3)	C.Albu 14' (o.g.); D.Flores 35'; A.Cristea (yellow card) 42'; Qaka (yellow card) 80'; Bekui 88'	Report	Bărboianu (yellow card) 57'; Grădinaru (yellow card) 64'; A.Marc (yellow card) 90+3'	Stadium: Emil Alexandrescu; Attendance: 1,500; Referee: George Rădulescu

16 September 2018 8	FC Voluntari	2–3	Politehnica Iași	Voluntari
18:00 EEST (UTC+3)	Căpățînă 56'; Malfleury 79'; Balaur (yellow card) 90+3'	Report	Cioinac 13'; A.Sin 38' (yellow card) 46'; M.Mihăescu 90+4'	Stadium: Anghel Iordănescu; Attendance: 200; Referee: Marian Alexandru Barbu

21 September 2018 9	Politehnica Iași	1–0	Dinamo București	Iași
21:00 EEST (UTC+3)	A.Cristea (yellow card) 25'; D.Flores 38'; A.Sin (yellow card) 41'	Report	Salomão (yellow card) 26'; Corbu (yellow card) 46'	Stadium: Emil Alexandrescu; Attendance: 6,800; Referee: Ovidiu Hațegan

30 September 2018 10	Gaz Metan Mediaș	1–0	Politehnica Iași	Mediaș
16:00 EEST (UTC+3)	M.Constantin 17' (yellow card) 77'; D.Olaru (yellow card) 19'; V.Crețu (yellow card) 39'; Fortes (yellow card) 54'; Ely 90+1'; Caiado (yellow card) 90+3'	Report	Panțîru (yellow card) 27'; Qaka (yellow card) 71'; Platini (yellow card) 78'; A.Sin (yellow card) 87'	Stadium: Gaz Metan; Attendance: 2,000; Referee: Sorin Andrei Antonie

5 October 2018 11	Politehnica Iași	1–2	Viitorul Constanța	Iași
21:00 EEST (UTC+3)	M.Mihăescu (yellow card) 32'; A.Cristea 42' (pen.); Frăsinescu (yellow card) 45+1'; D.Flores (yellow card) 45+3'	Report	I.Hagi 20', 45+2' (pen.) (yellow card) 23'; Mailson Lima Duarte Lopes (yellow card) 28'; D.Drăguș (yellow card) 46'	Stadium: Emil Alexandrescu; Attendance: 5,500; Referee: Horațiu Feșnic (Cluj)

19 October 2018 12	CFR Cluj	1–0	Politehnica Iași	Cluj-Napoca
21:00 EEST (UTC+3)	A.Mureșan 19'; A.C.Ioniță (yellow card) 58'; Culio (yellow card) 81'; Arlauskis (yellow card) 90+3'	Report		Stadium: Dr. Constantin Rădulescu; Attendance: 4,000; Referee: Cătălin Popa

26 October 2018 13	Politehnica Iași	0–2	Hermannstadt	Iași
18:00 EEST (UTC+3)	Platini (yellow card) 84'	Report	Tsoumou 23'; Serediuc (yellow card) 32'; L.M.Dumitriu 38'; Mijušković (yellow card) 69'; Dâlbea (yellow card) 73'	Stadium: Emil Alexandrescu; Attendance: 1,000; Referee: István Kovács (Carei)

2 November 2018 14	Politehnica Iași	0–3	Universitatea Craiova	Iași
21:00 EET (UTC+2)	L.Rus (red card) 10'; Qaka (yellow card) 81'; Cioinac (yellow card) 90'	Report	Bancu (yellow card) 24'; A.Mitriță (yellow card) 40' (goal) 53'; Mateiu 47'; Koljić 70'	Stadium: Emil Alexandrescu; Attendance: 1,000; Referee: Andrei Chivulete

10 November 2018 15	Astra Giurgiu	1–2	Politehnica Iași	Giurgiu
15:00 EET (UTC+2)	N.Roșu (yellow card) 33'; V.Gheorghe 45' (yellow card) 50'; Bègue (yellow card) 49'; Bejan (yellow card) 88'	Report	A.Sin (yellow card) 33' (yellow-red card) 41'; Platini 51'; A.Cristea 59' (pen.); Qaka (yellow card) 83'	Stadium: Marin Anastasovici; Attendance: 200; Referee: George Rădulescu

25 November 2018 16	Politehnica Iași	1–2	FCSB	Iași
20:30 EET (UTC+2)	Bădic (yellow card) 28'; D.Flores 53'; A.Cristea (yellow card) 72'	Report	F.Teixeira (yellow card) 17'; Man 61'; F.Tănase 77' (pen.); Bălgrădean (yellow card) 90+1'	Stadium: Emil Alexandrescu; Attendance: 4,000; Referee: Marius Avram

30 November 2018 17	Politehnica Iași	1–1	Sepsi Sfântu Gheorghe	Iași
17:30 EET (UTC+2)	D.Flores 21'	Report	Vașvari 8'; Karnitsky (yellow card) 74'	Stadium: Emil Alexandrescu; Attendance: 1,200; Referee: Alexandru Tudor (Bucharest)

6 December 2018 18	FC Botoșani	1–2	Politehnica Iași	Botoșani
17:00 EET (UTC+2)	G.Miron 6'	Report	A.Sin (yellow card) 22'; Platini 34'; D.Flores 45+2' (yellow card) 90'; A.Cristea (yellow card) 51'; P.Petre (yellow card) 67'; D.Rusu (yellow card) 90+6'	Stadium: Municipal; Attendance: 2,000; Referee: Marian Alexandru Barbu

9 December 2018 19	Politehnica Iași	1–0	Dunărea Călărași	Iași
14:00 EET (UTC+2)	Platini 33'; M.Sanoh (yellow card) 48'	Report		Stadium: Emil Alexandrescu; Attendance: 1,500; Referee: George Rădulescu

14 December 2018 20	Concordia Chiajna	3–6	Politehnica Iași	Chiajna
20:00 EET (UTC+2)	A.Marc 21', 64'; Gorobsov (yellow card) 62'; C.Albu 67'	Report	A.Cristea 4', 57'; M.Sanoh 8', 55'; D.Flores 48' (yellow card) 73'; Frăsinescu (yellow card) 90'; Platini 90+1'	Stadium: Concordia; Attendance: 50; Referee: Alexandru Tudor (Bucharest)

21 December 2018 21	Politehnica Iași	2–2	FC Voluntari	Iași
17:30 EET (UTC+2)	D.Flores 45+1' (yellow card) 60'; Frăsinescu (yellow card) 55'; L.Enoh 88'; O.Mihalache (yellow card) 90'; Qaka (yellow card) 90+1'	Report	Tudorie 56', 59' (pen.); Laïdouni (yellow card) 69'; A.Vlad (yellow card) 85'; Răuță (yellow card) 90'	Stadium: Emil Alexandrescu; Attendance: 1,000; Referee: Adrian Viorel Cojocaru

2 February 2019 22	Dinamo București	v	Politehnica Iași	București
EET (UTC+2)				Stadium: Dinamo

9 February 2019 23	Politehnica Iași	v	Gaz Metan Mediaș	Iași
EET (UTC+2)				Stadium: Emil Alexandrescu

16 February 2019 24	Viitorul Constanța	v	Politehnica Iași	Ovidiu
EET (UTC+2)				Stadium: Viitorul

23 February 2019 25	Politehnica Iași	v	CFR Cluj	Iași
EET (UTC+2)				Stadium: Emil Alexandrescu

3 March 2019 26	Hermannstadt	v	Politehnica Iași	Sibiu
EET (UTC+2)				Stadium: Municipal

==== Relegation round ====
===== Table =====
Pos	Team	Pld	W	D	L	GF	GA	GD	Pts	Qualification or relegation
7	Gaz Metan Mediaș	14	10	2	2	25	9	+16	48	
8	Botoșani	14	8	2	4	18	9	+9	44	
9	Dinamo București	14	8	3	3	16	7	+9	43	
10	Politehnica Iași	14	3	5	6	12	18	−6	31	
11	Voluntari	14	5	5	4	14	16	−2	31	
12	Hermannstadt (O)	14	2	5	7	9	19	−10	27	Qualification for the relegation play-offs
13	Dunărea Călărași (R)	14	3	4	7	8	18	−10	25	Relegation to Liga II
14	Concordia Chiajna (R)	14	2	4	8	17	23	−6	19	Relegation to Liga II

Source: Soccerway
Rules for classification: 1) Points; 2) Points without rounding; 3) Head-to-head points; 4) Head-to-head goal difference; 5) Head-to-head goals scored; 6) Goal difference; 7) Goals scored; 8) Play-off (only if needed to decide teams for relegation). (Note: only criteria 6 and 7 are applied to establish the classification during the competition.)
(O) Play-off winners; (R) Relegated

===== Results summary =====
Overall								Home						Away					
Pld	W	D	L	GF	GA	GD	Pts	W	D	L	GF	GA	GD	W	D	L	GF	GA	GD
0	0	0	0	0	0	0	0	0	0	0	0	0	0	0	0	0	0	0	0

Last updated: 8 March 2019.
Source: Liga I

===== Position by round =====
Round	1	2	3	4	5	6	7	8	9	10	11	12	13	14
Ground	H	A	H	A	H	H	A	A	H	A	H	A	A	H
Result														
Position														

Updated to match(es) played on 8 March 2019. Source: Liga I
A = Away; H = Home; W = Win; D = Draw; L = Loss

===== Matches =====
Win Draw Loss

8 March 2019 1	Politehnica Iași	v	Voluntari	Iași
				Stadium: Emil Alexandrescu

15 March 2019 2	Dunărea Călărași	v	Politehnica Iași	Călărași
				Stadium: Ion Comșa

29 March 2019 3	Politehnica Iași	v	Gaz Metan Mediaș	Iași
				Stadium: Emil Alexandrescu

5 April 2019 4	Hermannstadt	v	Politehnica Iași	Sibiu
				Stadium: Municipal

12 April 2019 5	Politehnica Iași	v	Dinamo București	Iași
				Stadium: Emil Alexandrescu

19 April 2019 6	Politehnica Iași	v	Concordia Chiajna	Iași
				Stadium: Emil Alexandrescu

26 April 2019 7	Botoșani	v	Politehnica Iași	Botoșani
				Stadium: Municipal

3 May 2019 8	Voluntari	v	Politehnica Iași	Voluntari
				Stadium: Anghel Iordănescu

10 May 2019 9	Politehnica Iași	v	Dunărea Călărași	Iași
				Stadium: Emil Alexandrescu

17 May 2019 10	Gaz Metan Mediaș	v	Politehnica Iași	Mediaș
				Stadium: Gaz Metan

24 May 2019 11	Politehnica Iași	v	Hermannstadt	Iași
				Stadium: Emil Alexandrescu

31 May 2019 12	Dinamo București	v	Politehnica Iași	Bucharest
				Stadium: Dinamo

7 June 2019 13	Concordia Chiajna	v	Politehnica Iași	Chiajna
				Stadium: Concordia

14 June 2019 14	Politehnica Iași	v	Botoșani	Iași
				Stadium: Emil Alexandrescu

=== Cupa României ===
Politehnica Iași will enter the Cupa României at the Round of 32.

== See also ==
- 2018–19 Cupa României
- 2018–19 Liga I
