= 2018–19 FCSB season =

FCSB
2018–19 season
- President: Valeriu Argăseală
- Manager: Nicolae Dică; Mihai Teja
- Stadium: Arena Națională
- Liga I: 2nd
- Cupa României: Round of 16
- Europa League: Play-off round
- Top goalscorer: League: Harlem Gnohéré (15); All: Harlem Gnohéré (19)
- Highest home attendance: 31,274 vs Rapid Wien (30 August 2018, Europa League)
- Lowest home attendance: 700 vs Dunărea Călărași (23 September 2018, Liga I)
- Average home league attendance: 6,992
Home colours	Away colours

The 2018–19 season was FCSB's 71st season since its founding in 1947.

== Previous season positions ==
	Competition	Position
(European Union)	UEFA Champions League	Play-off round
(European Union)	UEFA Europa League	Round of 32
(Romania)	Liga I	2nd
(Romania)	Cupa României	Quarter-finals

== Players ==
=== First team squad ===
As of 1 April 2019

Note: Flags indicate national team as defined under FIFA eligibility rules; some limited exceptions apply. Players may hold more than one non-FIFA nationality.

No.	Pos.	Nation	Player
4	DF	ROU	Mihai Bălașa
5	MF	ROU	Mihai Pintilii (captain)
6	MF	ROU	Dragoș Nedelcu
7	FW	ROU	Florinel Coman
8	MF	ROU	Lucian Filip (vice-captain)
9	FW	FRA	Harlem Gnohéré
10	FW	ROU	Florin Tănase (4th captain)
11	MF	ROU	Olimpiu Moruțan
12	GK	ROU	Răzvan Ducan
13	DF	BRA	Júnior Morais
15	DF	SRB	Marko Momčilović
16	DF	SRB	Bogdan Planić (3rd captain)
17	DF	ROU	Iulian Cristea

No.	Pos.	Nation	Player
20	DF	ROU	Romario Benzar
21	FW	ROU	Ioan Hora
23	MF	ROU	Ovidiu Popescu
24	FW	ROU	Raul Rusescu
27	MF	ROU	Adrian Stoian
28	MF	ROU	Mihai Roman
34	GK	ROU	Cristian Bălgrădean
70	MF	ROU	Florentin Matei
77	DF	ROU	Alexandru Stan
80	MF	POR	Filipe Teixeira
98	FW	ROU	Dennis Man
99	GK	ROU	Andrei Vlad

=== Transfers ===
==== In ====
No.	Pos.	Nat.	Name	Age	EU	Moving from	Type	Transfer window	Ends	Transfer fee	Source
13	DF	(Romania)	Marian Pleașcă	28	EU	Gaz Metan Mediaș	Loan return	Summer	Undisclosed	—	
26	FW	(Romania)	Daniel Benzar	20	EU	Voluntari	Loan return	Summer	2019	—	
17	MF	(Croatia)	Antonio Jakoliš	26	EU	Apollon Limassol (Cyprus)	Loan return	Summer	2020	—	
24	MF	(Romania)	Paul Szecui	17	EU	Metaloglobus București	Loan return	Summer	Undisclosed	—	
29	MF	(Romania) (Brazil)	William De Amorim	26	EU	Kayserispor (Turkey)	Loan return	Summer	2021	—	
11	MF	(Romania)	Olimpiu Moruțan	19	EU	Botoșani	Transfer	Summer	2023	€700,000	steauafc.com
92	MF	(Albania)	Kamer Qaka	23	EU	Politehnica Iași	Transfer	Summer	2023	€400,000	steauafc.com
24	FW	(Romania)	Raul Rusescu	30	EU	Osmanlıspor (Turkey)	Transfer	Summer	2020	Free	steauafc.com
77	DF	(Romania)	Alexandru Stan	29	EU	Astra Giurgiu	Transfer	Summer	2021	€300,000	steauafc.com
28	MF	(Romania)	Mihai Roman	33	EU	Botoșani	Transfer	Summer	2020	€400,000	steauafc.com
33	MF	(Bulgaria)	Hristo Zlatinski	33	EU	U Craiova	Transfer	Summer	2019	Free	steauafc.com
70	MF	(Romania)	Florentin Matei	25	EU	Ittihad Kalba (United Arab Emirates)	Transfer	Winter	2022	Free	steauafc.com
27	MF	(Romania)	Adrian Stoian	27	EU	Crotone (Italy)	Transfer	Winter	2022	Free	steauafc.com
21	FW	(Romania)	Ioan Hora	30	EU	Elazığspor (Turkey)	Transfer	Winter	2021	Free	steauafc.com
17	DF	(Romania)	Iulian Cristea	24	EU	Gaz Metan Mediaș	Transfer	Winter	2023	€150,000	steauafc.com

==== Out ====
No.	Pos.	Nat.	Name	Age	EU	Moving to	Type	Transfer window	Transfer fee	Source
19	DF	(Portugal)	Artur Jorge	23	EU	Braga (Portugal)	End of loan	Summer	—	
33	GK	(Romania)	Eduard Stăncioiu	37	EU	U Craiova	End of contract	Summer	—	
30	MF	(Romania)	Cristian Tănase	31	EU	Eskişehirspor (Turkey)	End of contract	Summer	—	
3	DF	(Romania)	Ionuț Larie	31	EU	Tobol (Kazakhstan)	Mutual termination	Summer	—	
20	MF	(Romania)	Vlad Achim	29	EU	Viitorul Constanța	Mutual termination	Summer	—	
25	DF	(Romania)	Valerică Găman	29	EU	Al-Shabab (Saudi Arabia)	Transfer	Summer	€75,000	
11	FW	(Romania)	Constantin Budescu	29	EU	Al-Shabab (Saudi Arabia)	Transfer	Summer	€2,500,000	steauafc.com
—	DF	(Romania)	Alexandru Aldea	23	EU	CSA Steaua București	Released	Summer	—	
—	FW	(Romania)	Rareș Enceanu	23	EU	FC Argeș Pitești	Released	Summer	—	
1	GK	(Romania)	Toma Niga	20	EU	Hermannstadt	Transfer	Summer	Undisclosed	
—	DF	(Romania)	Gabriel Simion	20	EU	Dunărea Călărași	Loan	Summer	—	
7	FW	(Romania)	Denis Alibec	27	EU	Astra Giurgiu	Transfer	Summer	€1,400,000	
22	FW	(Romania)	Cătălin Golofca	28	EU	Botoșani	Transfer	Summer	€400,000	
92	MF	(Albania)	Kamer Qaka	23	EU	Politehnica Iași	Transfer	Summer	Undisclosed	steauafc.com
—	DF	(Romania)	Marian Pleașcă	28	EU	Gaz Metan Mediaș	Mutual termination	Summer	€200,000	steauafc.com
26	FW	(Romania)	Daniel Benzar	21	EU	Dunărea Călărași	Loan	Winter	—	
21	MF	(Romania)	Ianis Stoica	16	EU	Dunărea Călărași	Loan	Winter	—	
29	FW	(Brazil)	William De Amorim	27	EU	Xanthi (Greece)	Loan	Winter	€150,000	
17	MF	(Croatia)	Antonio Jakoliš	26	EU	APOEL (Cyprus)	Transfer	Winter	€75,000	steauafc.com
33	MF	(Bulgaria)	Hristo Zlatinski	34	EU	Botev Vratsa (Bulgaria)	Mutual termination	Winter	—	steauafc.com

==== Overall transfer activity ====
===== Expenditure =====
Summer: ▼€1,800,000

Winter: ▼€150,000

Total: ▼€1,950,000

===== Income =====
Summer: ▲€4,575,000

Winter: ▲€225,000

Total: ▲€4,800,000

===== Net Totals =====
Summer: ▲€2,775,000

Winter: ▲€75,000

Total: ▲€2,850,000

== Friendly matches ==
Win Draw Loss

21 June 2018 Friendly	Steaua București (Romania)	4–1	(Romania) Cornu	Brașov, Romania
18:00 EET (UTC+2)	Coman 2', 45'; Fl. Tănase 39' (pen.); Ov. Popescu 87'		Unknown 65'	Stadium: Forex; Attendance: 500

27 June 2018 Friendly	Steaua București (Romania)	9–1	(Romania) Colțea Brașov	Brașov, Romania
17:00 EET (UTC+2)	Man 4'; Ov. Popescu 11', 15', 48'; Fl. Tănase 29', 40'; Budescu 54'; Nedelcu 62'; Júnior Morais 69'		Nicodim 30'	Stadium: Carpați; Attendance: 1,000

4 July 2018 Friendly	Steaua București (Romania)	1–1	(Belgium) Club Brugge	Garderen, Netherlands
19:30 EET (UTC+2)	Teixeira 52'; Fl. Tănase (penalty missed) 76'		Denswil 4'	Stadium: Sportpark De Westeneng; Attendance: 500

7 July 2018 Friendly	Steaua București (Romania)	1–1	(Netherlands) Ajax	Hattem, Netherlands
20:00 EET (UTC+2)	Fl. Tănase 6'		Eiting 24'	Stadium: Sportpark 't Achterveen; Attendance: 4,000

9 July 2018 Friendly	Steaua București (Romania)	1–2	(Greece) PAOK	Wenum Wiesel, Netherlands
20:00 EET (UTC+2)	Man 47'		Vieirinha 5'; El Kaddouri 10'	Stadium: WWNA; Attendance: 500

13 July 2018 Friendly	Steaua București (Romania)	2–1	(Qatar) Al-Gharafa	Wenum Wiesel, Netherlands
19:30 EET (UTC+2)	Man 17'; Jakoliš 90+2'		Sneijder 32'	Stadium: WWNA; Attendance: 500

17 November 2018 Friendly	Steaua București (Romania)	3–0	(Romania) Progresul Spartac București	Bucharest, Romania
	Gnohéré 6'; Tănase 15' (pen.); D. Benzar 74'			Stadium: Baza Sportivă FCSB

17 January 2019 Friendly	Steaua București (Romania)	0–0	(Switzerland) Luzern	Coín, Spain
17:00 EET (UTC+2)				Stadium: Estadio Jose Burgos Quintana

20 January 2019 Friendly	Steaua București (Romania)	2–2	(China) Shanghai Greenland Shenhua	Spain
17:00 EET (UTC+2)	Tănase 8'; Lu 49' (o.g.)		Romero 72'; Lu 75'	Stadium: La Quinta Football Pitch

23 January 2019 Friendly	Steaua București (Romania)	1–1	(Ukraine) Dynamo Kyiv	Marbella, Spain
17:00 EET (UTC+2)	Hora 90+4'		Sidcley 90'	Stadium: Marbella Football Center

== Competitions ==
Win Draw Loss

=== Overview ===
Competition	First match	Last match	Starting round	Final position	Record							
Competition	First match	Last match	Starting round	Final position	Pld	W	D	L	GF	GA	GD	Win %
Liga I	21 July 2018	18 May 2019	Matchday 1	2nd	36	21	9	6	67	35	+32	58.33
Cupa României	27 September 2018	1 November 2018	Round of 32	Round of 16	2	1	0	1	2	2	+0	50.00
Europa League	26 July 2018	30 August 2018	Second qualifying round	Play-off round	6	4	1	1	11	5	+6	66.67
Total					44	26	10	8	80	42	+38	59.09

Last updated: 19 May 2019.
Source: Competitions

=== Liga I ===
==== Regular season ====
===== Table =====
Pos	Team	Pld	W	D	L	GF	GA	GD	Pts	Qualification
1	CFR Cluj	26	15	9	2	39	16	+23	54	Qualification for the Championship round
2	FCSB	26	14	7	5	49	29	+20	49	Qualification for the Championship round
3	Universitatea Craiova	26	13	6	7	43	24	+19	45	Qualification for the Championship round
4	Astra Giurgiu	26	11	9	6	36	23	+13	42	Qualification for the Championship round
5	Viitorul Constanța	26	11	5	10	26	27	−1	38	Qualification for the Championship round

Source: LPF (in Romanian), Soccerway
Rules for classification: 1) Points; 2) Head-to-head points; 3) Head-to-head goal difference; 4) Head-to-head goals scored; 5) Goal difference; 6) Goals scored; 7) Play-off.

===== Results summary =====
Overall								Home						Away					
Pld	W	D	L	GF	GA	GD	Pts	W	D	L	GF	GA	GD	W	D	L	GF	GA	GD
26	14	7	5	49	29	+20	49	9	2	2	26	12	+14	5	5	3	23	17	+6

Source: FCSB

===== Position by round =====
Round	1	2	3	4	5	6	7	8	9	10	11	12	13	14	15	16	17	18	19	20	21	22	23	24	25	26
Ground	A	H	H	A	H	A	H	A	H	A	H	A	H	H	A	A	H	A	H	A	H	A	H	A	H	A
Result	L	D	W	W	W	W	D	D	W	W	L	L	W	W	D	W	W	L	W	W	L	D	W	D	W	D
Position	12	10	6	2	2	1	1	1	1	1	1	2	2	2	2	2	2	2	2	2	2	2	2	3	2	2

Source: Matches
A = Away; H = Home; W = Win; D = Draw; L = Loss

===== Results =====
21 July 2018 1	Astra Giurgiu	1–0	FCSB	Giurgiu
21:00 EEST (UTC+03)	Llullaku 43', (yellow card) 90+4'; Mrzljak (yellow card) 50'; Buș (yellow card) 73'; Balaure (yellow card) 83'		Ov. Popescu (yellow card) 19'; Qaka (yellow card) 61'; Planić (yellow card) 63'; Júnior Morais (yellow card) 90+1'	Stadium: Marin Anastasovici; Attendance: 3,500; Referee: István Kovács; Assistant referees: Vasile Marinescu, Ovidiu Artene; Fourth official: Marian Barbu

29 July 2018 2	FCSB	3–3	Dinamo București	Bucharest
21:00 EEST (UTC+03)	Gnohéré 10', (yellow card) 13'; Ov. Popescu (yellow card) 16'; Man (yellow card) 20'; Coman 55', 68'		Hanca (yellow card) 35'; Axente 45+2'; M. Popescu (yellow card) 45+4', (goal) 89'; Corbu (yellow card) 59'; Nistor 61', (yellow card) 77'	Stadium: Arena Națională; Attendance: 27,835; Referee: Ovidiu Hațegan; Assistant referees: Octavian Șovre, Sebastian Gheorghe; Fourth official: Iulian Dima

5 August 2018 3	FCSB	4–0	Politehnica Iași	Bucharest
21:00 EEST (UTC+03)	Gnohéré 24', 58'; Momčilović (yellow card) 85'; Man 86'; Moruțan 90+3'		Cioinac (yellow card) 36'; Mihalache (yellow card) 56'; Sanoh (red card) 84'	Stadium: Arena Națională; Attendance: 3,784; Referee: Radu Petrescu; Assistant referees: Mircea Grigoriu, Vladimir Urzică; Fourth official: Marian Barbu

12 August 2018 4	Gaz Metan Mediaș	1–3	FCSB	Mediaș
21:00 EEST (UTC+03)	Olaru (yellow card) 18'; Fortes (yellow card) 25'; Fofana 30'		Rusescu (yellow card) 16'; Moruțan 49'; Tănase (yellow card) 59'; Gnohéré 63'; Popescu (yellow card) 71'; Coman 83'	Stadium: Gaz Metan; Attendance: 5,000; Referee: Marius Avram; Assistant referees: Adrian Radu Ghinguleac, Mihai Marius Marica; Fourth official: Horia Gabriel Mladinovici

19 August 2018 5	FCSB	2–0	Sepsi Sfântu Gheorghe	Bucharest
18:00 EEST (UTC+03)	Mihai Bălașa (yellow card) 70'; Gnohéré 81' (pen.); Coman 85'		Sato (yellow card) 58'; Gabriel (yellow card) 84'	Stadium: Arena Națională; Attendance: 3,583; Referee: George Radulescu; Assistant referees: Mircea Orbuleț, Ionel Valentin Dumitru; Fourth official: Marcel Bîrsan

26 August 2018 6	Viitorul Constanța	1–4	FCSB	Ovidiu
21:00 EEST (UTC+03)	Ghiță (red card) 5'; Mățan (yellow card) 14'; Vînă 71'; Houri (yellow card) 86'		Filip (yellow card) 8'; Coman 45'; Nedelcu (yellow card) 45+4'; Man 52'; Popescu (yellow card) 69'; Qaka (yellow card) 78'; Júnior Morais (yellow card) 78'; D. Benzar 82'; Rusescu 89'	Stadium: Viitorul; Attendance: 4,500; Referee: István Kovács; Assistant referees: Vasile Marinescu, Ovidiu Artene; Fourth official: Florin Andrei

2 September 2018 7	FCSB	2–2	Botoșani	Voluntari
21:30 EEST (UTC+03)	Man 4', (yellow card) 67'; Gnohéré 21' (pen.); Júnior Morais (yellow card) 29'; Jakoliš (yellow card) 45'; Nedelcu (yellow card) 45+1'; Filip (yellow card) 71'; Planić (yellow card) 84'		Chitoșcă (yellow card) 23'; Papa 43', (yellow card) 53'; Roman II 75'; Eduard Florescu (yellow card) 90+4'	Stadium: Anghel Iordănescu; Attendance: 1,500; Referee: Horațiu Mircea Feșnic; Assistant referees: Valentin Avram, Alexandru Cerei; Fourth official: Florin Mihai Marcu

16 September 2018 8	CFR Cluj	1–1	FCSB	Cluj-Napoca
21:00 EEST (UTC+03)	Camora (yellow card) 19'; Djoković (yellow card) 27'; Țucudean 48'; Omrani (yellow card) 49'		Nedelcu (yellow card) 3'; Stan (yellow card) 7'; Coman 24'; Bălașa (yellow card) 38'	Stadium: Dr. Constantin Rădulescu; Attendance: 12,000; Referee: Radu Petrescu; Assistant referees: Radu Ghinguleac, Mircea Grigoriu; Fourth official: Robert Dumitru; MVP: 12,000

23 September 2018 9	FCSB	2–0	Dunărea Călărași	Voluntari
21:00 EEST (UTC+03)	Man 8'; Tănase 45'; Moruțan (yellow card) 61'		Keyta (yellow card) 18'; Kanda (yellow card) 57'; Ispas (yellow card) 60'; Dobrosavlevici (yellow card) 74'; Pană (yellow card) 86'	Stadium: Anghel Iordănescu; Attendance: 700; Referee: Ionuț Coza; Assistant referees: Ovidiu Artene, Stelian Slabu; Fourth official: Sebastian Colțescu

30 September 2018 10	Hermannstadt	1–3	FCSB	Târgu Mureș
21:00 EEST (UTC+03)	Dâlbea 25'; Antonov (yellow card) 37'; Tătar (yellow card) 83'; Tsoumou (yellow card) 90+3'		Tănase 41', 66'; Moruțan (yellow card) 42'; R. Benzar (yellow card) 51'; Gnohéré 57', (yellow card) 77'	Stadium: Trans-Sil; Attendance: 2,000; Referee: George Radulescu; Assistant referees: Iulian Radu, George Neacșu; Fourth official: Marian Barbu

7 October 2018 11	FCSB	0–1	Concordia Chiajna	Voluntari
21:00 EEST (UTC+03)	Rusescu (yellow card) 86'; Teixeira (yellow card) 87'		Grădinaru (yellow card) 52'; Batin 60'; Gorobsov (yellow card) 67'; Deaconu (yellow card) 73'; Ivanovici (yellow card) 77'; Cristescu (yellow card) 90+2'; Greab (yellow card) 90+4'	Stadium: Anghel Iordănescu; Attendance: 800; Referee: Alexandru Tudor; Assistant referees: Ciprian Florin Danșa, Marius Badea; Fourth official: Ionuț Coza

21 October 2018 12	Universitatea Craiova	2–1	FCSB	Craiova
21:00 EEST (UTC+03)	Mateiu (yellow card) 44'; Fedele (yellow card) 45+3', (goal) 72'; Koljić 50'; Briceag (yellow card) 57'; Martić (yellow card) 90+4'		Kelić 8' (o.g.); Tănase (yellow card) 31'; Nedelcu (yellow card) 45+3'; Júnior Morais (red card) 86'; Benzar (yellow card) 90+2'	Stadium: Ion Oblemenco; Attendance: 30,000; Referee: Marcel Bîrsan; Assistant referees: Mircea Mihail Grigoriu, Marius Nicoară; Fourth official: Iulian Dima

27 October 2018 13	FCSB	2–1	Voluntari	Bucharest
21:00 EEST (UTC+02)	Gnohéré 52', 76'		Tudorie 85'	Stadium: Arena Națională; Attendance: 2,532; Referee: Adrian Cojocaru; Assistant referees: Daniel Hulubei, Gabriel Bârjac; Fourth official: Cătălin Popa

4 November 2018 14	FCSB	1–0	Astra Giurgiu	Bucharest
21:00 EEST (UTC+02)	Júnior Morais (yellow card) 20'; Roman (yellow card) 26'; Benzar (yellow card) 44'; Gnohéré 67' (pen.); Moruțan (yellow card) 81'		Gheorghe (yellow card) 42'	Stadium: Arena Națională; Attendance: 2,533; Referee: Horațiu Feșnic; Assistant referees: Octavian Şovre, Sebastian Gheorghe; Fourth official: Lucian Rusandu

11 November 2018 15	Dinamo București	1–1	FCSB	Bucharest
21:00 EEST (UTC+02)	Salomão 40' (pen.); Neicuțescu (yellow card) 45+2'; Gomelt (yellow card) 71'		Bălgrădean (yellow card) 39'; Tănase 48'; Gnohéré (red card) 52'; Benzar (yellow card) 62'; Nedelcu (yellow card) 70'; Planić (yellow card) 87'	Stadium: Arena Națională; Attendance: 21,763; Referee: István Kovács; Assistant referees: Vasile Marinescu, Ovidiu Artene; Fourth official: Marian Barbu

25 November 2018 16	Politehnica Iași	1–2	FCSB	Iași
20:30 EEST (UTC+02)	Bădic (yellow card) 28'; Flores 53'; Cristea (yellow card) 72'		Teixeira (yellow card) 16'; Man 61'; Tănase 77' (pen.); Bălgrădean (yellow card) 90+1'	Stadium: Emil Alexandrescu; Attendance: 4,000; Referee: Marius Avram; Assistant referees: Mircea Orbuleţ, Mircea Grigoriu; Fourth official: Robert Dumitru

2 December 2018 17	FCSB	2–1	Gaz Metan Mediaș	Pitești
20:00 EEST (UTC+02)	Júnior Morais (yellow card) 5'; Bălașa (yellow card) 35'; Man 41'; Tănase 53' (pen.); Moruțan (red card) 69'; Nedelcu (yellow card) 83'		Ivanov (yellow card) 9' (yellow-red card) 38'; Constantin (yellow card) 27'; Crețu (yellow card) 57'; Carlos Fortes 63'; Bușu (yellow card) 79'; Chamed (yellow card) 83'; Aurélio (yellow card) 88'; Fofana (yellow card) 90+2'	Stadium: Nicolae Dobrin; Attendance: 3,245; Referee: Ovidiu Haţegan; Assistant referees: Octavian Şovre, Adrian Radu Ghinguleac; Fourth official: Horia Gabriel Mladinovici

5 December 2018 18	Sepsi Sfântu Gheorghe	4–2	FCSB	Sfântu Gheorghe
20:00 EEST (UTC+02)	Vașvari 32'; Ștefan 36'; Tandia 53'; Mensah 90+4'		Coman 61'; Rusescu 88'	Stadium: Municipal; Attendance: 2,500; Referee: Horațiu Feșnic; Assistant referees: Alexandru Cerei, Mircea Orbuleţ; Fourth official: Sergiu Popa

10 December 2018 19	FCSB	2–0	Viitorul Constanța	Pitești
20:00 EEST (UTC+02)	Nedelcu (yellow card) 19'; Tănase 41', (yellow card) 55'; Filip 76'; Júnior Morais (yellow card) 80'		Achim (yellow card) 46'; Ghiță (yellow card) 70'	Stadium: Nicolae Dobrin; Attendance: 5,000; Referee: Marius Avram; Assistant referees: Mircea Mihail Grigoriu, Marius Nicoară; Fourth official: Andrei Florin Chivulete

16 December 2018 20	Botoșani	1–3	FCSB	Botoșani
20:00 EEST (UTC+02)	Golofca 23'; Fabbrini (yellow card) 28'; Miron (yellow card) 41'		Gnohéré 14'; Júnior Morais (yellow card) 34'; Filip 38'; Coman (yellow card) 53'; Stan (yellow card) 61'; Roman (yellow card) 71'; Man (yellow card) 85'; Rusescu 86'	Stadium: Municipal; Attendance: 4,000; Referee: Marcel Bîrsan; Assistant referees: Bogdan Gheorghe, Mihai Marius Marica; Fourth official: Andrei Florin Chivulete

22 December 2018 21	FCSB	0–2	CFR Cluj	Bucharest
20:00 EEST (UTC+02)	Roman (red card) 72'; Bălașa (yellow card) 72' (yellow-red card) 90+6'; Gnohéré (yellow card) 74'; R. Benzar (yellow card) 89'		Deac 28'; Camora (yellow card) 61'; Culio (yellow card) 74'; Mureșan (yellow card) 78' (yellow-red card) 90+2'; Ioniță 90+6'	Stadium: Arena Națională; Attendance: 10,000; Referee: Sebastian Colţescu; Assistant referees: Octavian Şovre, Sebastian Gheorghe; Fourth official: Adrian Comănescu

2 February 2019 22	Dunărea Călărași	1–1	FCSB	Călărași
14:00 EEST (UTC+02)	Mediop 30'; Bourceanu (yellow card) 39'; Honciu (yellow card) 42'		Man 16'; Stoian (yellow card) 36'; Júnior Morais (yellow card) 41'; Benzar (yellow card) 45+1'; Moruțan (yellow card) 63'; Nedelcu (yellow card) 86'	Stadium: Ion Comșa; Attendance: 8,000; Referee: Ovidiu Haţegan; Assistant referees: Octavian Şovre, Sebastian Gheorghe; Fourth official: Cătălin Popa

11 February 2019 23	FCSB	3–0	Hermannstadt	Bucharest
20:00 EEST (UTC+02)	Dâlbea 3' (o.g.); Hora 17'; Planić (yellow card) 74'; Coman (yellow card) 86'; Teixeira 90+2'		Dumitriu (yellow card) 51'; Moreira (yellow card) 58'	Stadium: Arena Națională; Attendance: 4,233; Referee: Cătălin Popa; Assistant referees: Marius Nicoară, George Florin Neacşu; Fourth official: Iulian Călin

18 February 2019 24	Concordia Chiajna	0–0	FCSB	Chiajna
20:00 EEST (UTC+02)	Meira (yellow card) 15'; Radu (yellow card) 35'; Ropotan (yellow card) 38'; Marc (yellow card) 64'; Caparco (yellow card) 75'; Cadamuro (yellow card) 90+1'			Stadium: Concordia; Attendance: 3,000; Referee: Adrian Cojocaru; Assistant referees: Valentin Avram, Marius Marchidanu; Fourth official: George Rădulescu

24 February 2019 25	FCSB	3–2	Universitatea Craiova	Bucharest
20:00 EEST (UTC+02)	Júnior Morais (yellow card) 24'; Hora 27', 84'; Filip 49'; Bălașa (yellow card) 72'; Man (red card) 88'		Fedele (yellow card) 26'; Pigliacelli 39' (pen.); Fortes (yellow card) 41'; Briceag (yellow card) 44' (yellow-red card) 89'; Bărbuț 46'; Koljić (yellow card) 52'; Bancu (yellow card) 67'; Kelić (red card) 82'	Stadium: Arena Națională; Attendance: 18,576; Referee: Marius Avram; Assistant referees: Mircea Orbuleţ, Sebastian Gheorghe; Fourth official: Cătălin Popa

2 March 2019 26	Voluntari	2–2	FCSB	Voluntari
19:00 EEST (UTC+02)	Răuță (yellow card) 25'; Armaș 28'; Căpățînă 45+1'; Gadze (yellow card) 50'; Vlad (yellow card) 76'; Laïdouni (yellow card) 76'; Deac (yellow card) 90+2' (yellow-red card) 90+3'		Tănase 14' (pen.); Teixeira (yellow card) 27' (yellow-red card) 81'; Hora 48'	Stadium: Anghel Iordănescu; Attendance: 3,766; Referee: Sebastian Colţescu; Assistant referees: Marius Nicoară, Daniel Mitruţi; Fourth official: Horia Mladinovici

==== Championship round ====
===== Table =====
Pos	Team	Pld	W	D	L	GF	GA	GD	Pts	Qualification
1	CFR Cluj (C)	10	7	2	1	15	4	+11	50	Qualification to Champions League first qualifying round
2	FCSB	10	7	2	1	18	6	+12	48	Qualification to Europa League first qualifying round
3	Viitorul Constanța	10	6	2	2	18	10	+8	39	Qualification to Europa League second qualifying round
4	Universitatea Craiova	10	4	1	5	8	10	−2	36	Qualification to Europa League first qualifying round
5	Astra Giurgiu	10	2	0	8	6	20	−14	27	
6	Sepsi OSK	10	0	1	9	5	20	−15	20	

Source: Soccerway, Romanian Football Federation
Rules for classification: 1) Points; 2) Points without rounding; 3) Head-to-head points; 4) Head-to-head goal difference; 5) Head-to-head goals scored; 6) Goal difference; 7) Goals scored; 8) Play-off (only if needed to decide champion or teams for UEFA competitions). (Note: only criteria 6 and 7 are applied to establish the classification during the competition.)
(C) Champions

===== Results summary =====
Overall								Home						Away					
Pld	W	D	L	GF	GA	GD	Pts	W	D	L	GF	GA	GD	W	D	L	GF	GA	GD
10	7	2	1	18	6	+12	23	4	0	1	8	4	+4	3	2	0	10	2	+8

Source: Liga I

===== Position by round =====
Round	1	2	3	4	5	6	7	8	9	10
Ground	H	A	H	H	A	A	H	A	A	H
Result	L	W	W	W	D	D	W	W	W	W
Position	3	3	2	2	2	2	2	2	2	2

Source: Liga I
A = Away; H = Home; W = Win; D = Draw; L = Loss

===== Matches =====
Win Draw Loss

11 March 2019 1	FCSB	1–2	Viitorul Constanța	Bucharest
20:30 EEST (UTC+02)	Bălașa (yellow card) 17'; Coman 40'; Filip (yellow card) 50'; Benzar (yellow card) 64'; Coman (yellow card) 76'		Calcan 15'; Mladen (yellow card) 30'; Hagi 65' (pen.); Artean (yellow card) 88'; Vînă (yellow card) 88'	Stadium: Arena Națională; Attendance: 8,783; Referee: Radu Petrescu; Assistant referees: Alexandru Cerei, Ciprian Florin Danşa; Fourth official: Marian Barbu

17 March 2019 2	Astra Giurgiu	0–2	FCSB	Giurgiu
20:30 EEST (UTC+02)	Bejan (yellow card) 7' (yellow-red card) 74'; Romário (yellow card) 20'; Butean (yellow card) 47'		Júnior Morais (yellow card) 13'; Gnohéré 29'; Cristea 32'; Tănase (yellow card) 76'; Roman (yellow card) 77'	Stadium: Marin Anastasovici; Attendance: 3,700; Referee: Horațiu Mircea Feșnic; Assistant referees: Valentin Avram, Mircea Orbuleţ; Fourth official: George Rădulescu

31 March 2019 3	FCSB	3–2	Universitatea Craiova	Bucharest
20:30 EEST (UTC+03)	Hora 8'; Man 30'; Gnohéré 71'; Planić (yellow card) 90+2'		Bancu (yellow card) 14' (goal) 23' (pen.); Cicâldău 45+2'; Mateiu (yellow card) 53'; Bărbuț (yellow card) 90+2'	Stadium: Arena Națională; Attendance: 21,730; Referee: Ovidiu Hațegan; Assistant referees: Octavian Șovre, Sebastian Gheorghe; Fourth official: Iulian Dima

8 April 2019 4	FCSB	2–0	Sepsi Sfântu Gheorghe	Bucharest
21:00 EEST (UTC+03)	Pintilii (yellow card) 10'; Gnohéré 51' (pen.); Coman 59'; Hora (yellow card) 77'		Aboud (yellow card) 43'	Stadium: Arena Națională; Attendance: 4,233; Referee: Radu Petrescu; Assistant referees: Radu Ghinguleac, Mircea Grigoriu; Fourth official: Eduard Ioniţă

14 April 2019 5	CFR Cluj	0–0	FCSB	Cluj-Napoca
21:00 EEST (UTC+03)	Djoković (yellow card) 52'; Camora (yellow card) 56'	Summary	Cristea (yellow card) 27'; Filip (yellow card) 81'; Júnior Morais (yellow card) 87'; Tănase (yellow card) 90+3'	Stadium: Dr. Constantin Rădulescu; Attendance: 14,000; Referee: István Kovács; Assistant referees: Vasile Marinescu, Mircea Cristian Orbuleț; Fourth official: Marcel Bîrsan

21 April 2019 6	Viitorul Constanța	1–1	FCSB	Ovidiu
21:00 EEST (UTC+03)	Țîru (yellow card) 45'; Achim (yellow card) 73' (yellow-red card) 75'; Hagi 80'		Benzar (yellow card) 26' (yellow-red card) 62'; Gnohéré 68'	Stadium: Viitorul; Attendance: 4,500; Referee: Marius Avram; Assistant referees: Ciprian Florin Danşa, Andrei Constantinescu; Fourth official: George Rădulescu

28 April 2019 7	FCSB	1–0	Astra Giurgiu	Bucharest
21:00 EEST (UTC+03)	Tănase (yellow card) 45', (goal) 55'; Cristea (yellow card) 49'; Teixeira (yellow card) 77'; Bălgrădean (yellow card) 90+3'		Moise (yellow card) 48'	Stadium: Arena Națională; Attendance: 3,514; Referee: Radu Petrescu; Assistant referees: Vladimir Urzică, Alexandru Vodă; Fourth official: Andrei Antonie

5 May 2019 8	Universitatea Craiova	0–2	FCSB	Craiova
21:00 EEST (UTC+03)	Dimitrov (yellow card) 11'; Donkor (yellow card) 32'; Kelić (yellow card) 33'; Pigliacelli (yellow card) 35'; Bancu (yellow card) 63'; Mihăilă (yellow card) 86'		Planić (yellow card) 20'; Hora (yellow card) 33'; Tănase 34' (pen.); Benzar (yellow card) 36'; Coman (yellow card) 58'; Júnior Morais (yellow card) 69'; Filip (yellow card) 88'; Man 90+5'	Stadium: Ion Oblemenco; Attendance: 27,000; Referee: István Kovács; Assistant referees: Vasile Marinescu, Ovidiu Artene; Fourth official: Adrian Comănescu

11 May 2019 9	Sepsi Sfântu Gheorghe	1–5	FCSB	Sfântu Gheorghe
21:00 EEST (UTC+03)	Karnitsky (yellow card) 4'; Nouvier (yellow card) 20'; Sato (yellow card) 31'; Viera (yellow card) 65'; Mensah 74'		Hora 6'; Roman 9'; Coman 46', 50'; Filip (yellow card) 66'; Rusescu 80' (pen.)	Stadium: Municipal; Attendance: 4,000; Referee: Marcel Bîrsan; Assistant referees: Radu Ghinguleac, Marius Nicoară; Fourth official: Andrei Chivulete

19 May 2019 10	FCSB	1–0	CFR Cluj	Bucharest
20:30 EEST (UTC+03)	Hora (penalty missed) 50'; Teixeira 53'; Roman (yellow card) 90+2'		Păun (yellow card) 70'; Maleš (yellow card) 85'; Djoković (yellow card) 90+2'	Stadium: Arena Națională; Attendance: 3,274; Referee: Iulian Călin; Assistant referees: George Florin Neacșu, Marius Florin Badea; Fourth official: Lucian Rusandu

=== Cupa României ===
==== Results ====
27 September 2018 Round of 32	Unirea Alba Iulia	0–1	FCSB	Zlatna
21:30 EEST (UTC+03)	Oară (yellow card) 23'		Rusescu 85'	Stadium: Municipal; Attendance: 3,000; Referee: Adrian Comanescu; Assistant referees: Marius Nicoară, Gabriel Stroe

1 November 2018 Round of 16	Dunărea Călărași	2–1	FCSB	Călărași
21:45 EEST (UTC+02)	Bourceanu (yellow card) 35'; Șeroni 47'; Dobrosavlevici 80'; Lungu (yellow card) 90+5'		Jakoliš (yellow card) 8'; Nedelcu (yellow card) 34'; Rusescu (yellow card) 34' (yellow-red card) 90+4'; Zlatinski (yellow card) 67'; Benzar (yellow card) 73'; Dumitru 82'; Moruțan (yellow card) 85'	Stadium: Ion Comșa; Attendance: 8,200; Referee: Sebastian Colțescu; Assistant referees: Daniel Mitruți, Dragoș Iliescu; Fourth official: George Rădulescu

=== UEFA Europa League ===
==== Qualifying rounds ====
===== Second qualifying round =====
26 July 2018 First leg	Rudar Velenje (Slovenia)	0–2	(Romania) FCSB	Velenje, Slovenia
19:30 EEST (UTC+03)	Muić (yellow card) 4'; Pušaver (yellow card) 42'; Kamara (yellow card) 88'	Report	Man 5'; Gnohéré (yellow card) 19'; Teixeira (yellow card) 29', (goal) 74'; Qaka (yellow card) 78'; R. Benzar (yellow card) 79'; Momčilović (yellow card) 84'	Stadium: Ob Jezeru City Stadium; Attendance: 450; Referee: Hüseyin Göçek (Turkey); Assistant referees: Kemal Yilmaz, Serkan Ok; Fourth official: Koray Gençerler

2 August 2018 Second leg	FCSB (Romania)	4–0 (6–0 agg.)	(Slovenia) Rudar Velenje	Bucharest, Romania
21:30 EEST (UTC+03)	Tănase 22' (pen.), (yellow card) 45'; Júnior Morais (yellow card) 30'; Mihai Bălașa (yellow card) 34'; Moruțan 49'; Coman 68'; D. Benzar 90+3'	Report	Kašnik (yellow card) 20'; Muić (yellow card) 48'; Vasiljević (yellow card) 76'	Stadium: Arena Națională; Attendance: 7,030; Referee: Sergey Ivanov (Russia); Assistant referees: Maksim Gavrilin, Roman Usachev; Fourth official: Evgheni Turbin

===== Third qualifying round =====
9 August 2018 First leg	Hajduk Split (Croatia)	0–0	(Romania) FCSB	Split, Croatia
21:45 EEST (UTC+03)	López (yellow card) 12'; Barry (yellow card) 74'	Report	Tănase (yellow card) 37'; Gnohéré (yellow card) 45+1'; Planić (yellow card) 47'; Júnior Morais (yellow card) 69'; Bălgrădean (yellow card) 82'	Stadium: Stadion Poljud; Attendance: 25,764; Referee: Tiago Martins (Portugal); Assistant referees: Luis Campos, Pedro Almeida; Fourth official: Hugo Miguel

16 August 2018 Second leg	FCSB (Romania)	2–1 (2–1 agg.)	(Croatia) Hajduk Split	Bucharest, Romania
21:30 EEST (UTC+03)	Tănase (yellow card) 45+1'; Gnohéré 55', 90+3'; Júnior Morais (yellow card) 86'; Rusescu (yellow card) 90+2'; R. Benzar (yellow card) 90+4'	Report	Barry (yellow card) 49'; Ivanovski (yellow card) 58'; López (yellow card) 58'; Šego (yellow card) 74'; Caktaš (yellow card) 78'; Said 82'; Vučur (yellow card) 90+4'	Stadium: Arena Națională; Attendance: 27,410; Referee: Juan Martínez Munuera (Spain); Assistant referees: Diego Barbero Sevilla, Cesar Manuel Noval Font; Fourth official: Mario Melero Lopez

===== Play-off round =====
23 August 2018 First leg	Rapid Wien (Austria)	3–1	(Romania) FCSB	Vienna, Austria
21:30 EEST (UTC+03)	Knasmüllner 4'; Sonnleitner (yellow card) 14', (goal) 40'; Berisha (yellow card) 41' (yellow-red card) 84'; Schwab 49'	Report	Popescu (yellow card) 45'; Gnohéré 47'; Pintilii (yellow card) 79'	Stadium: Allianz Stadion; Attendance: 19,300; Referee: Willie Collum (Scotland); Assistant referees: David McGeachie, Douglas Ross; Fourth official: Nicholas Walsh

30 August 2018 Second leg	FCSB (Romania)	2–1 (3–4 agg.)	(Austria) Rapid Wien	Bucharest, Romania
21:30 EEST (UTC+03)	Gnohéré 11'; R. Benzar (yellow card) 23'; Roman (yellow card) 45+1', (goal) 45+2'; Teixeira (yellow card) 53'; Bălașa (red card) 90+1'	Report	Potzmann (yellow card) 32'; Barać (yellow card) 35'; Müldür (yellow card) 47'; Sonnleitner 63'	Stadium: Arena Națională; Attendance: 31,274; Referee: Michael Oliver (England); Assistant referees: Stuart Burt, Simon Bennett; Fourth official: Stuart Attwell

== Statistics ==
=== Appearances and goals ===
As of 19 May 2019

No.	Pos	Player	Liga I		Cupa României		Europa League		Total	
No.	Pos	Player	Apps	Goals	Apps	Goals	Apps	Goals	Apps	Goals
4	DF	(Romania) Mihai Bălașa	20	0	0	0	5	0	25	0
5	MF	(Romania) Mihai Pintilii	9	0	0	0	6	0	15	0
6	MF	(Romania) Dragoș Nedelcu	26	0	1	0	2	0	29	0
7	FW	(Romania) Florinel Coman	35	11	0	0	3	1	38	12
8	MF	(Romania) Lucian Filip	31	3	2	0	4	0	37	3
9	FW	(France) Harlem Gnohéré	29	15	0	0	6	4	35	19
10	FW	(Romania) Florin Tănase	34	10	1	0	5	1	40	11
11	MF	(Romania) Olimpiu Moruțan	27	2	2	0	5	1	34	3
13	DF	(Brazil) Júnior Morais	28	0	2	0	4	0	34	0
15	DF	(Serbia) Marko Momčilović	3	0	0	0	2	0	5	0
16	DF	(Serbia) Bogdan Planić	28	0	0	0	6	0	34	0
17	DF	(Romania) Iulian Cristea	10	1	0	0	1	0	11	1
20	DF	(Romania) Romario Benzar	30	0	0	0	5	0	35	0
21	FW	(Romania) Ioan Hora	14	6	0	0	0	0	14	6
23	MF	(Romania) Ovidiu Popescu	10	0	0	0	2	0	12	0
24	FW	(Romania) Raul Rusescu	19	4	2	1	3	0	24	5
27	MF	(Romania) Adrian Stoian	2	0	0	0	0	0	2	0
28	MF	(Romania) Mihai Roman	16	1	2	0	2	1	20	2
34	GK	(Romania) Cristian Bălgrădean	34	0	0	0	5	0	39	0
80	MF	(Portugal) Filipe Teixeira	27	2	1	0	5	1	33	3
70	MF	(Romania) Florentin Matei	6	0	0	0	0	0	6	0
77	DF	(Romania) Alexandru Stan	10	0	1	0	2	0	13	0
98	FW	(Romania) Dennis Man	33	9	1	0	5	1	39	10
99	GK	(Romania) Andrei Vlad	3	0	2	0	1	0	6	0
Players from FCSB II
—	DF	(Romania) Marian Botezatu	0	0	1	0	0	0	1	0
22	FW	(Romania) Cristian Dumitru	0	0	1	0	0	0	1	0
29	MF	(Romania) Tudor Moldovan	0	0	1	0	0	0	1	0
30	FW	(Romania) Alexandru Bodea	0	0	1	0	0	0	1	0
42	MF	(Romania) Daniel Toma	0	0	1	0	0	0	1	0
Players transferred out during the season
—	MF	(Croatia) Antonio Jakoliš	8	0	2	0	3	0	13	0
—	MF	(Romania) Ianis Stoica	0	0	1	0	0	0	1	0
26	MF	(Romania) Daniel Benzar	3	1	1	0	1	1	5	2
33	MF	(Bulgaria) Hristo Zlatinski	3	0	2	0	0	0	5	0
92	MF	(Albania) Kamer Qaka	5	0	0	0	2	0	7	0

=== Squad statistics ===
	Liga I	Cupa României	Europa League	Home	Away	Total Stats
Games played	36	2	6	21	23	44
Games won	21	1	4	15	11	26
Games drawn	9	0	1	2	8	10
Games lost	6	1	1	3	5	8
Goals scored	67	2	11	39	41	80
Goals conceded	35	2	5	16	26	42
Goal difference	+32	0	+6	+23	+15	+38
Clean sheets	13	1	3	10	7	17
Goal by Substitute	14	1	1	8	8	16
Total shots	364	0	55	221	198	419
Shots on target	183	0	31	115	99	214
Corners	202	0	28	121	109	230
Players used	28	20	23	27	34	34
Offsides	74	0	14	44	44	88
Fouls suffered	582	0	104	314	372	686
Fouls committed	562	0	87	289	360	649
Yellow cards	93	5	22	53	67	120
Red cards	8	1	1	4	6	10
Winning rate	58.33%	50%	66.67%	76.19%	43.48%	59.09%

Last updated: 19 May 2019
Source: Competitive matches

=== Goalscorers ===
As of 19 May 2019

Rank	Position	Name	Liga I	Cupa României	Europa League	Total
1	FW	(France) Harlem Gnohéré	15	0	4	19
2	FW	(Romania) Florinel Coman	11	0	1	12
3	FW	(Romania) Florin Tănase	10	0	1	11
4	FW	(Romania) Dennis Man	9	0	1	10
5	FW	(Romania) Ioan Hora	6	0	0	6
6	FW	(Romania) Raul Rusescu	4	1	0	5
7	MF	(Romania) Lucian Filip	3	0	0	3
7	MF	(Romania) Olimpiu Moruțan	2	0	1	3
7	MF	(Portugal) Filipe Teixeira	2	0	1	3
10	FW	(Romania) Daniel Benzar	1	0	1	2
10	MF	(Romania) Mihai Roman	1	0	1	2
12	DF	(Romania) Iulian Cristea	1	0	0	1
12	FW	(Romania) Cristian Dumitru	0	1	0	1
Own goal			2	0	0	2
Total			67	2	11	80

=== Goal minutes ===
	1'–15'	16'–30'	31'–HT	46'–60'	61'–75'	76'–FT	Extra time	Forfeit
Goals	12	9	10	19	10	20	0	0
Percentage	15%	11.25%	12.5%	23.75%	12.5%	25%	0%	0%

Last updated: 19 May 2019 (UTC)
Source: FCSB (in Romanian)

=== Hat-tricks ===
Player	Against	Result	Date	Competition

=== Clean sheets ===
As of 19 May 2019

Rank	Name	Liga I	Cupa României	Europa League	Total	Games played
1	(Romania) Cristian Bălgrădean	12	0	3	15	39
2	(Romania) Andrei Vlad	1	1	0	2	6
Total		13	1	3	17	44

=== Disciplinary record ===
As of 19 May 2019

Rank	Position	Name	Liga I			Cupa României			Europa League			Total		
Rank	Position	Name	Booked	(yellow card) (yellow-red card)	Sent off (straight red)	Booked	(yellow card) (yellow-red card)	Sent off (straight red)	Booked	(yellow card) (yellow-red card)	Sent off (straight red)	Booked	(yellow card) (yellow-red card)	Sent off (straight red)
1	DF	(Brazil) Júnior Morais	12	0	1	0	0	0	3	0	0	15	0	1
2	DF	(Romania) Romario Benzar	8	1	0	0	0	0	3	0	0	11	1	0
3	MF	(Romania) Dragoș Nedelcu	8	0	0	1	0	0	0	0	0	9	0	0
3	FW	(Romania) Florin Tănase	6	0	0	0	0	0	3	0	0	9	0	0
5	DF	(Romania) Mihai Bălașa	5	1	0	0	0	0	1	0	1	6	1	1
5	DF	(Serbia) Bogdan Planić	7	0	0	0	0	0	1	0	0	8	0	0
7	MF	(Portugal) Filipe Teixeira	4	1	0	0	0	0	2	0	0	6	1	0
8	MF	(Romania) Olimpiu Moruțan	4	0	1	1	0	0	0	0	0	5	0	1
8	MF	(Romania) Mihai Roman	4	0	1	0	0	0	1	0	0	5	0	1
8	FW	(France) Harlem Gnohéré	3	0	1	0	0	0	2	0	0	5	0	1
11	MF	(Romania) Lucian Filip	5	0	0	0	0	0	0	0	0	5	0	0
11	MF	(Romania) Ovidiu Popescu	4	0	0	0	0	0	1	0	0	5	0	0
13	FW	(Romania) Dennis Man	3	0	1	0	0	0	0	0	0	3	0	1
13	FW	(Romania) Raul Rusescu	2	0	0	0	1	0	1	0	0	3	1	0
13	FW	(Romania) Florinel Coman	4	0	0	0	0	0	0	0	0	4	0	0
13	GK	(Romania) Cristian Bălgrădean	3	0	0	0	0	0	1	0	0	4	0	0
17	DF	(Romania) Alexandru Stan	2	0	0	0	0	0	0	0	0	2	0	0
17	DF	(Romania) Iulian Cristea	2	0	0	0	0	0	0	0	0	2	0	0
17	FW	(Romania) Ioan Hora	2	0	0	0	0	0	0	0	0	2	0	0
17	MF	(Croatia) Antonio Jakoliš	1	0	0	1	0	0	0	0	0	2	0	0
17	MF	(Albania) Kamer Qaka	1	0	0	0	0	0	1	0	0	2	0	0
17	DF	(Serbia) Marko Momčilović	1	0	0	0	0	0	1	0	0	2	0	0
17	MF	(Romania) Mihai Pintilii	1	0	0	0	0	0	1	0	0	2	0	0
24	MF	(Romania) Adrian Stoian	1	0	0	0	0	0	0	0	0	1	0	0
24	DF	(Bulgaria) Hristo Zlatinski	0	0	0	1	0	0	0	0	0	1	0	0
24	FW	(Romania) Daniel Benzar	0	0	0	1	0	0	0	0	0	1	0	0
Total			92	3	5	5	1	0	22	0	1	119	4	6

=== Attendances ===
As of 19 May 2019

	Matches	Attendances	Average	High	Low
Liga I	18	125,855	6,992	27,835	700
Cupa României	0	0	0	0	0
Europa League	3	65,714	21,905	31,274	7,030
Total	21	191,569	9,122	31,274	700

== Awards ==
=== Liga I Foreign Player of the Year ===
Year	Winner
2018	(France) Harlem Gnohéré

=== Liga I team of the regular season ===
Position	Player
DF	(Romania) Romario Benzar
FW	(Romania) Florin Tănase

=== Liga I team of the championship round ===
Position	Player
DF	(Romania) Romario Benzar
DF	(Romania) Iulian Cristea
FW	(Romania) Dennis Man
FW	(Romania) Florinel Coman
FW	(France) Harlem Gnohéré

=== Liga I team of the season ===
Position	Player
DF	(Romania) Romario Benzar
FW	(Romania) Dennis Man
FW	(Romania) Florinel Coman
FW	(France) Harlem Gnohéré

== UEFA Club rankings ==
This is the current UEFA Club Rankings, including season 2017–18.

Rank	Team	Points	Mvmnt
49	(Greece) PAOK	29.500	▲ (+12)
50	(Belgium) Club Brugge	29.500	▲ (+3)
51	(Turkey) Galatasaray	29.500	▼ (–20)
52	(Germany) Borussia Mönchengladbach	29.000	▼ (–16)
53	(Italy) Milan	28.000	▼ (–12)
54	(Romania) FCSB	27.500	▲ (+6)
55	(Cyprus) APOEL	27.000	▲ (+33)
56	(Belgium) Gent	27.000	▲ (+3)
57	(Belgium) Genk	27.000	▼ (–13)
58	(Netherlands) AZ	25.000	▲ (+7)
59	(Poland) Legia Warsaw	24.500	▲ (+15)

== See also ==
- 2018–19 Cupa României
- 2018–19 Liga I
- 2018–19 UEFA Europa League
