= Gabriel Popa =

Gabriel Popa may refer to:

- Gabriel Popa (painter) (1937–1995), Romanian painter
- Gabriel Popa (footballer) (born 1985), Romanian footballer
- Gabriel Popa (bobsleigh) (born 1977), Romanian Olympic bobsledder
