= Cătălin Straton =

Romanian footballer (born 1989)

Personal information
- Full name: Cătălin George Straton
- Date of birth: 9 October 1989 (age 37)
- Place of birth: Bucharest, Romania
- Height: 1.91 m (6 ft 3 in)
- Position: Goalkeeper

Team information
- Current team: Argeș Pitești
- Number: 1

Youth career
- 1997–2004: Milisport București
- 2004–2009: Rapid București

Senior career*
Years	Team	Apps	(Gls)
2009–2011	Rapid București	8	(0)
2012–2014	Vaslui	17	(0)
2014–2016	Universitatea Craiova	13	(0)
2016–2018	ACS Poli Timișoara	59	(0)
2018–2019	Dunărea Călărași	28	(0)
2019–2020	Dinamo București	12	(0)
2020–2022	FCSB	6	(0)
2022–	Argeș Pitești	68	(0)

International career
2010	Romania U21	1	(0)
- * Club domestic league appearances and goals as of 24 July 2026

Cătălin George Straton (born 9 October 1989) is a Romanian professional footballer who plays as a goalkeeper for Liga I club Argeș Pitești.

== Club career ==
He joined Dinamo București in 2019. In September 2020, he moved on a free transfer to FCSB.

== Career statistics ==
As of match played 24 July 2026

Appearances and goals by club, season and competition
Club	Season	League			Cupa României		Cupa Ligii		Europe		Other		Total	
Club	Season	Division	Apps	Goals	Apps	Goals	Apps	Goals	Apps	Goals	Apps	Goals	Apps	Goals
Rapid București	2009–10	Liga I	3	0	0	0	—		—		—		3	0
Rapid București	2010–11	Liga I	2	0	0	0	—		—		—		2	0
Rapid București	2011–12	Liga I	3	0	2	0	—		1 (Note: Appearance in UEFA Europa League)	0	—		6	0
Rapid București	Total		8	0	2	0	—		1	0	—		11	0
Vaslui	2011–12	Liga I	0	0	0	0	—		—		—		0	0
Vaslui	2012–13	Liga I	8	0	1	0	—		1	0	—		10	0
Vaslui	2013–14	Liga I	9	0	0	0	—		—		—		9	0
Vaslui	Total		17	0	1	0	—		1	0	—		19	0
Universitatea Craiova	2014–15	Liga I	2	0	1	0	0	0	—		—		3	0
Universitatea Craiova	2015–16	Liga I	11	0	1	0	1	0	—		—		13	0
Universitatea Craiova	Total		13	0	2	0	1	0	—		—		16	0
ACS Poli Timișoara	2016–17	Liga I	35	0	0	0	3	0	—		1 (Note: Appearances in relegation/promotion play-offs)	0	39	0
ACS Poli Timișoara	2017–18	Liga I	24	0	1	0	—		—		—		25	0
ACS Poli Timișoara	Total		59	0	1	0	3	0	—		1	0	64	0
Dunărea Călărași	2018–19	Liga I	28	0	1	0	—		—		—		29	0
Dinamo București	2019–20	Liga I	9	0	4	0	—		—		—		13	0
Dinamo București	2020–21	Liga I	3	0	—		—		—		—		3	0
Dinamo București	Total		12	0	4	0	—		—		—		16	0
FCSB	2020–21	Liga I	5	0	0	0	—		1	0	—		6	0
FCSB	2021–22	Liga I	1	0	1	0	—		—		—		2	0
FCSB	Total		6	0	1	0	—		1	0	—		8	0
Argeș Pitești	2022–23	Liga I	24	0	0	0	—		—		1	0	25	0
Argeș Pitești	2023–24	Liga II	16	0	0	0	—		—		—		16	0
Argeș Pitești	2024–25	Liga II	20	0	4	0	—		—		—		24	0
Argeș Pitești	2025–26	Liga I	7	0	4	0	—		—		—		11	0
Argeș Pitești	2026–27	Liga I	1	0	0	0	—		—		—		1	0
Argeș Pitești	Total		68	0	8	0	—		—		1	0	77	0
Career total			211	0	20	0	4	0	4	0	2	0	241	0

== Honours ==
ACS Poli Timișoara

- Cupa Ligii runner-up: 2016–17

FCSB

- Supercupa României runner-up: 2020

Argeș Pitești

- Liga II: 2024–25
