= Stelian Cucu =

Romanian footballer

Personal information
- Full name: Stelian Nicolae Cucu
- Date of birth: 15 September 1989 (age 37)
- Place of birth: Galaţi, Romania
- Height: 1.84 m (6 ft 0 in)
- Positions: Defender; midfielder

Youth career
- –2005: Dunărea Galați

Senior career*
Years	Team	Apps	(Gls)
2005–2014	Dunărea Galați	154	(11)
2010–2011	→ Concordia Chiajna (loan)	12	(0)
2014–2015	Oțelul Galați	26	(0)
2015–2018	Botoșani	64	(1)
2018–2019	Dunărea Călărași	13	(0)
2019	Chindia Târgoviște	0	(0)
2020	Concordia Chiajna	10	(1)
2021	Oțelul Galați	6	(0)
2021–2023	Sporting Liești	38	(2)
Total		323	(15)
- * Club domestic league appearances and goals as of 11:29, 9 January 2024 (UTC)

Stelian Nicolae Cucu (born 15 September 1989) is a Romanian former professional footballer who played as a defender or midfielder for clubs such as Dunărea Galați, Oțelul Galați or FC Botoșani, among others.

== Honours ==
Oțelul Galați

- Liga III: 2020–21
