= Najib Ammari =

Algerian footballer (born 1992)

Personal information
- Full name: Abdelmajid Najib Ammari
- Date of birth: 10 April 1992 (age 34)
- Place of birth: Marseille, France
- Height: 1.78 m (5 ft 10 in)
- Position: Midfielder

Youth career
- Marseille

Senior career*
Years	Team	Apps	(Gls)
2011–2013	Marseille B	22	(7)
2012–2013	→ Rouen B (loan)	5	(1)
2013	Chernomorets Burgas	19	(6)
2014	CFR Cluj	5	(0)
2014	Levski Sofia	6	(0)
2015–2016	Latina	42	(3)
2016–2017	Virtus Entella	24	(3)
2017–2018	Spezia	13	(2)
2019	Dunărea Călărași	18	(4)
2019	Viitorul Constanța	1	(0)
2020	Damac	2	(0)
2021	Viterbese	3	(0)
2021–2022	CR Belouizdad	0	(0)

International career
2009	Algeria U17	3	(0)
- * Club domestic league appearances and goals as of 2 May 2021

Abdelmajid Najib Ammari (born 10 April 1992) is an Algerian footballer who plays as a midfielder.

== Club career ==
In June 2012, Ammari signed his first professional contract with Olympique Marseille. He joined leading Bulgarian club Levski Sofia for a period of two years in September 2014.

On 23 January 2021, he joined Italian Serie C club Viterbese.

== International career ==
In 2009, Ammari was a member of the Algeria national under-17 football team at the 2009 FIFA U-17 World Cup in Nigeria. He played in all three of Algeria's matches in the group stage.
