= Marian Obedeanu =

Romanian footballer

Personal information
- Full name: Marian Cosmin Obedeanu
- Date of birth: 11 December 2000 (age 25)
- Place of birth: Bucharest, Romania
- Height: 1.75 m (5 ft 9 in)
- Position: Midfielder

Youth career
- –2018: Concordia Chiajna

Senior career*
Years	Team	Apps	(Gls)
2018–2021	Concordia Chiajna	9	(0)
2020	→ Mostiștea Ulmu (loan)		
2021–2022	Academica Clinceni	9	(0)
2022–2023	Botoșani	0	(0)
2023	Unirea Constanța	4	(0)
2023	Unirea Bascov	9	(1)
2024	Afumați	5	(0)
2024–2025	Dunărea Călărași	13	(1)
2025–2026	CS Dinamo București	7	(0)
- * Club domestic league appearances and goals as of 27 September 2025

Marian Cosmin Obedeanu (born 11 December 2000) is a Romanian professional footballer who plays as a midfielder.

== Honours ==
Afumați

- Liga III: 2023–24
