= Sorin Pană =

Romanian footballer

Personal information
- Full name: Sorin Constantin Pană
- Date of birth: 28 November 1981 (age 44)
- Place of birth: Bucharest, Romania
- Height: 1.72 m (5 ft 7 1/2 in)
- Positions: Centre back; left midfielder

Senior career*
Years	Team	Apps	(Gls)
2000–2004	Gloria Buzău	87	(11)
2004–2010	CS Otopeni	146	(24)
2010–2011	Concordia Chiajna	39	(4)
2012–2013	CS Otopeni	35	(2)
Total		307	(41)
- * Club domestic league appearances and goals as of 2 January 2016 ‡ National team caps and goals as of 25 July 2010

Sorin Constantin Pană (born 28 November 1981 in Bucharest) is a Romanian former footballer who played as a defender and midfielder. His first match in Liga I was against Sportul Studențesc. His Best friend is Silviu Pană from CS Concordia Chiajna.
