= Filip Gligorov =

Macedonian footballer

Personal information
- Date of birth: 31 July 1993 (age 33)
- Place of birth: Skopje, Macedonia
- Height: 1.77 m (5 ft 10 in)
- Position: Defender

Team information
- Current team: Ferizaj
- Number: 20

Youth career
- Rabotnički

Senior career*
Years	Team	Apps	(Gls)
2011–2012	Rabotnički	21	(0)
2011–2012	Cementarnica		
2013	Baník Ružiná	11	(2)
2013	Šamorín	10	(0)
2014	Gorno Lisiče	13	(0)
2014–2016	Olimpik Sarajevo	32	(0)
2016	Shkupi	6	(0)
2017–2018	Sileks	47	(0)
2018–2019	Dunărea Călărași	24	(0)
2019–2020	Vllaznia	24	(0)
2020–2021	Shkupi	28	(1)
2021–2022	Partizani Tirana	7	(0)
2022	Kukësi	19	(1)
2022	Shakhter Karagandy	10	(0)
2023–	Ferizaj	66	(0)

International career^{‡}
2011–2012	Macedonia U19	3	(0)
- * Club domestic league appearances and goals as of 22 June 2026 ‡ National team caps and goals as of 27 July 2018

Filip Gligorov (born 31 July 1993) is a Macedonian professional footballer who plays as a midfielder for Kosovar side Ferizaj.

== International career ==
Gligorov played in three matches for Macedonia U19, against Switzerland U19, Ukraine U19 and Kazakhstan U19.

== Honours ==
Rabotnički

- Macedonian Football Cup: Runner-up 2011–12

Olimpik Sarajevo

- Bosnia and Herzegovina Football Cup: 2014–15
