= Gaston Mendy =

Senegalese footballer

Personal information
- Full name: Gaston Xavier Mendy
- Date of birth: 22 November 1985 (age 40)
- Place of birth: Dakar, Senegal
- Height: 1.76 m (5 ft 9 in)
- Position: Defender

Youth career
- –2004: Jeanne d'Arc

Senior career*
Years	Team	Apps	(Gls)
2004–2005	Jeanne d'Arc		
2005–2006	Monção		
2006–2007	Estoril	26	(2)
2007–2010	Farul Constanța	69	(2)
2010–2012	Universitatea Cluj	45	(1)
2012–2013	Petrolul Ploiești	1	(0)
2013	Universitatea Cluj	15	(0)
2014	Rapid București	8	(0)
2015–2016	Mladá Boleslav	1	(0)
2015–2016	Benátky nad Jizerou	12	(1)
2016–2017	ASA Târgu Mureș	41	(0)
2018–2020	Dunărea Călărași	56	(1)
Total		274	(7)
- * Club domestic league appearances and goals

Gaston Xavier Mendy (born 22 November 1985) is a Senegalese former professional footballer who played as a defender.

== Career ==
Mendy was born on 22 November 1985 in Dakar, Senegal and began playing junior-level football at Jeanne d'Arc. In 2004 he started to play senior-level football at Jeanne d'Arc. One year later he moved to Portuguese fourth league club, Monção. Another year later he joined second league side, Estoril.

In 2007, Mendy switched countries again, going to Romania at Farul Constanța, after being noticed by the club's technical director Marin Ion. He made his Liga I debut on 28 July, as coach Constantin Gache used him as a starter in a 4–0 away loss to FC Universitatea Craiova. After two seasons, the club was relegated to the second league, but Mendy stayed with them for one more season, before signing with Universitatea Cluj. In his first season spent with The Red Caps, he scored a goal in a 2–1 win over Oțelul Galați, but also received three red cards. In the summer of 2012, he was transferred to Petrolul Ploiești, along with 11 other players from "U" Cluj, a move that occurred when the owner of the Cluj team left the club to take control of Petrolul. After playing only one league game for The Yellow Wolves, Mendy left the team, returning to "U" Cluj. In September 2014 he was brought to Rapid București by one of his former coaches from Universitatea, Ionel Ganea.

In 2015, Mendy joined Mladá Boleslav, playing only one game in the Czech First League on 30 May when coach Karel Jarolím used him as a starter in a 3–0 home win over Vysočina Jihlava. With them he also made his only appearance in European competitions, playing the entire match in a 2–1 home loss to Strømsgodset in the second round of the 2015–16 Europa League qualifying phase. In 2016 he returned to Romania at ASA Târgu Mureș with whom he was relegated at the end of the season. Mendy started the 2017–18 Liga II season at ASA, but in the middle of it he joined Dunărea Călărași in the same league where he was wanted by coach Dan Alexa, and they achieved promotion to the first league at season's end. In the following season, Mendy made his last Liga I appearances, having a total of 165 matches with one goal scored in the competition, and Dunărea was relegated back to the second league. He stayed one more season with Dunărea, then retired in 2020.

== Honours ==
Mladá Boleslav

- Czech Cup: 2015–16

Dunărea Călărași

- Liga II: 2017–18
