= Gabriel Popa (footballer) =

Romanian footballer

Personal information
- Full name: Gabriel Daniel Popa
- Date of birth: 27 August 1985 (age 41)
- Place of birth: Călărași, Romania
- Height: 1.84 m (6 ft 0 in)
- Position: Goalkeeper

Senior career*
Years	Team	Apps	(Gls)
2005–2007	Dunărea Călărași		
2007–2012	Astra Ploiești	15	(0)
2010–2011	→ Astra II Giurgiu	8	(0)
2012–2020	Dunărea Călărași	8	(0)
Total		31	(0)

Managerial career
- 2021–: Dunărea Călărași (GK Coach)
- * Club domestic league appearances and goals as of 08:59, 9 August 2021 (UTC)

Gabriel Daniel Popa (born 27 August 1985) is a Romanian former footballer who played as a goalkeeper for Dunărea Călărași and Astra Ploiești.

== Honours ==
Dunărea Călărași

- Liga II: 2017–18
- Liga III: 2014–15
