= Gabriel Popa (painter) =

- Born: 18 July 1937; Ploiești, Romania
- Died: Summer 1995
- Known for: Painting

Gabriel Popa (1937–1995) was a Romanian painter.

Popa was born on 18 July 1937 in Ploiești, Romania. He graduated from the Art Institute in Cluj Napoca. He moved to Timişoara in 1961. He was a professor, between 1962 and 1974, at the city's Art Institute, teaching painting and drawing. Since 1974, Gabriel Popa became a professional painter, member of the Romania's Artists Guild. He died of leukemia in the summer of 1995.

His art is known and appreciated in Romania and internationally. He participated in collective exhibitions in Romania, Yugoslavia, Italy, Spain, Austria and Germany. He had personal exhibitions in Timişoara, Bucharest and Reşiţa, Romania; in Ettlingen and Baden-Baden, Germany and Vienna, Austria.

His large projects include a fresco for the National Opera House, Timişoara (35 sq. m) and wood panels painted series for the Roman Catholic Church in Orsova (50 sq. m).

His works can be found in public and private collections in Romania, Germany, Italy, France, Israel, Croatia, Serbia, Spain, Japan, Canada, Switzerland, Greece and Venezuela.

== External links/References ==
- Brief Bio
