= Mediop Ndiaye =

Senegalese footballer

Personal information
- Date of birth: 2 June 1991 (age 35)
- Place of birth: Saint-Louis, Senegal
- Height: 1.75 m (5 ft 9 in)
- Position: Forward

Youth career
- 2005–2010: Olympique Saint-Louis

Senior career*
Years	Team	Apps	(Gls)
2010–2013	Olympique Saint-Louis	50	(43)
2013–2014	Ghiroda	32	(28)
2014–2018	Ripensia Timișoara	123	(127)
2018–2020	Dunărea Călărași	35	(7)
2020–2021	Argeș Pitești	24	(1)
2021–2022	CSM Reșița	23	(33)
2022–2023	Concordia Chiajna	24	(7)
2023–2024	CSM Reșița	9	(3)
Total		320	(249)
- * Club domestic league appearances and goals as of 30 November 2023

Mediop Ndiaye (born 2 June 1991) is a Senegalese professional footballer who plays as a forward. Mediop started his career in Senegal at Olympique de Saint-Louis and in Romania played at all levels, from Liga I to Liga IV, mainly for Ripensia Timișoara.

== Club career ==
=== Olympique de Saint-Louis ===
Mediop started his career in Senegal, at Olympique de Saint-Louis, a football club from his hometown.

=== ACS Ghiroda ===
In 2013 he moved to Romania and signed with Liga IV side ACS Ghiroda. In his first season Mediop was the goalscorer of the team with 28 goals and the second goalscorer of the Liga IV, Timiș County series. Ghiroda won the series and qualified for the promotion play-off but failed to obtain it.

=== Ripensia Timișoara ===
In the summer of 2014 Mediop signed with Ripensia Timișoara, a club of big tradition in Romania, but which was refounded only in 2012 after 64 years of inactivity. He was the goalscorer of Liga IV, Timiș County series, this time with 32 goals in 33 matches, being also the first foreign goalscorer of the league, but failed to obtain the promotion to the Liga III at the end of the season. Next season the forward from Senegal broke all the records and scored 55 goals for Ripi in 33 matches, sending his team directly in the Liga III.

In the Liga III Mediop had another fantastic season, being the goalscorer of the yellow and reds, 4th series and entire league, with 21 goals in 23 matches. At the end of the season Ripenisa obtained the second consecutive promotion.

In his first match at Liga II Ndiaye scored 7 goals against Foresta Suceava in a 16–0 win for his team and led the goalscorers tables for a long time, finally finishing 3rd, with 19 goals in 34 matches played.

=== Dunărea Călărași ===
In the summer of 2018, after four seasons in which he was every time the goalscorer of Ripensia, with a total of 127 goals in 123 league matches, Mediop was transferred by Dunărea Călărași, team newly promoted in the Liga I. Mediop made his debut on 5 August 2018 in a 1–1 draw against FC Hermannstadt.

== Honours ==
ACS Ghiroda

- Liga IV – Timiș County: 2013–14

Ripensia Timișoara

- Liga III: 2016–17
- Liga IV – Timiș County: 2015–16
- Cupa României – Timiș County: 2014–15

CSM Reșița

- Liga III: 2021–22

=== Individual ===
- Liga III top scorer: 2016–17 (21 goals), 2021–22 (33 goals)
- Liga IV – Timiș County top scorer: 2014–15 (32 goals), 2015–16 (55 goals)
