= Silviu Pană =

Romanian footballer

Personal information
- Full name: Silviu Gabriel Pană
- Date of birth: 24 September 1991 (age 35)
- Place of birth: Bucharest, Romania
- Height: 1.80 m (5 ft 11 in)
- Positions: Central midfielder; attacking midfielder

Team information
- Current team: Concordia Chiajna
- Number: 5

Youth career
- –2009: Concordia Chiajna

Senior career*
Years	Team	Apps	(Gls)
2009–2014	Concordia Chiajna	75	(8)
2014	→ Săgeata Năvodari (loan)	10	(2)
2014–2015	Viitorul Constanța	24	(0)
2015–2016	Concordia Chiajna	9	(0)
2016	→ FC Brașov (loan)	18	(1)
2016–2017	Olimpia Satu Mare	25	(8)
2017–2018	Dunărea Călărași	43	(7)
2019–2020	Turris Turnu Măgurele	39	(12)
2020–2022	Petrolul Ploiești	19	(2)
2022	Politehnica Timișoara	14	(2)
2023	Concordia Chiajna	7	(0)
2023–2024	Gloria Băneasa	0	(0)

International career^{‡}
2011–2012	Romania U21	2	(0)
- * Club domestic league appearances and goals as of 1 June 2023 ‡ National team caps and goals as of 14 September 2020

Silviu Gabriel Pană (born 24 September 1991 in Bucharest) is a Romanian footballer who plays as a midfielder for Liga II club Concordia Chiajna.

First match in Liga I was played for Concordia Chiajna, against Sportul Studențesc. His older brother is Sorin Pană.

== Club career ==
=== Pandurii Târgu Jiu ===
On 20 June 2014, Pandurii Târgu Jiu announced the signing of Pană on a one-year loan deal with an option to buy. On 19 July 2014, Pandurii Târgu Jiu terminated the loan of Pană just a month after he was loaned because Pandurii Târgu Jiu had too many midfielders in the team.

=== Turris Turnu Măgurele ===
On 21 June 2019, Pană joined newly promoted Liga II club Turris Turnu Măgurele.

=== Petrolul Ploiești ===
On 16 December 2020, Pană joined Petrolul Ploiești on a half-year contract.

== Honours ==
Dunărea Călărași

- Liga II: 2017–18

Petrolul Ploiești

- Liga II: 2021–22
