= Alin Dobrosavlevici =

Romanian professional footballer

Personal information
- Date of birth: 24 October 1994 (age 32)
- Place of birth: Moldova Nouă, Romania
- Height: 1.87 m (6 ft 2 in)
- Position: Defender

Team information
- Current team: Sepsi OSK
- Number: 21

Youth career
- –2011: LPS Banatul Timișoara
- 2011–2013: Dinamo București

Senior career*
Years	Team	Apps	(Gls)
2011–2013	Dinamo II București	36	(2)
2014	ACS Poli Timișoara	1	(0)
2014	Fortuna Poiana Câmpina	10	(0)
2014–2015	Berceni	10	(0)
2015–2016	Academica Clinceni	23	(0)
2016–2017	ASA Târgu Mureș	18	(0)
2017–2020	Concordia Chiajna	33	(1)
2018–2019	→ Dunărea Călărași (loan)	46	(3)
2020	Hermannstadt	4	(0)
2020–2021	Viitorul Constanța	28	(3)
2021–2022	Farul Constanța	9	(0)
2022–2023	Argeș Pitești	34	(1)
2023–2025	Gloria Buzău	48	(1)
2025–	Sepsi OSK	16	(1)

International career
2012	Romania U19	2	(0)
- * Club domestic league appearances and goals as of 18 September 2026

Alin Dobrosavlevici (Serbian Cyrillic: Алин Добросавиљевић, romanized: Alin Dobrosavljević; born 24 October 1994) is a Romanian professional footballer who plays as a defender for Liga I club Sepsi OSK.

== Honours ==
Dunărea Călărași

- Liga II: 2017–18
