= Baudoin Kanda =

Romanian footballer

Personal information
- Full name: Baudoin Tshitungi Dieudonne Kanda
- Date of birth: 17 April 1993 (age 33)
- Place of birth: Bucharest, Romania
- Height: 1.82 m (6 ft 0 in)
- Position: Midfielder

Team information
- Current team: Dunărea Călărași
- Number: 11

Youth career
- –2012: Dinamo București

Senior career*
Years	Team	Apps	(Gls)
2010–2012	Dinamo București B	8	(0)
2012–2021	Dunărea Călărași	117	(26)
2019	→ UTA Arad (loan)	14	(2)
2019–2020	→ Farul Constanța (loan)	21	(3)
2020–2021	→ Concordia Chiajna (loan)	6	(0)
2022	Buzău	5	(0)
2022	Dunărea Călărași	13	(7)
2023	CS Dinamo	7	(3)
2023–	Dunărea Călărași	26	(8)

International career^{‡}
2008	Romania U15	1	(0)
- * Club domestic league appearances and goals as of 17:08, 6 December 2024 (UTC) ‡ National team caps and goals as of 14:28, 24 September 2021 (UTC)

Baudoin Tshitungi Dieudonne Kanda (born 17 April 1993) is a Romanian footballer who plays as a midfielder for Dunărea Călărași.

== Personal life ==
Kanda is of Congolese descent through his father who is a medical doctor at the Vitan Polyclinic. In 2008 when he was 15 years old, he was called up by coach Florin Cheran at Romania's under-15 national team, making him the first black Romanian footballer that represented the country internationally, regardless the age category.

== Honours ==
Dunărea Călărași

- Liga II: 2017–18
- Liga III: 2014–15
