= Valentin Alexandru =

Romanian professional footballer

Personal information
- Full name: Valentin Marius Alexandru
- Date of birth: 17 September 1991 (age 35)
- Place of birth: Popești-Leordeni, Romania
- Height: 1.80 m (5 ft 11 in)
- Position: Forward

Team information
- Current team: Gloria Bistrița
- Number: 91

Youth career
- Viscofil Popești-Leordeni

Senior career*
Years	Team	Apps	(Gls)
2008–2009	Viscofil Popești-Leordeni		
2009–2011	Victoria Brănești	14	(2)
2010	→ Săgeata Năvodari (loan)	10	(2)
2011	→ Juventus București (loan)	11	(0)
2012	Otopeni	10	(3)
2013	FC Clinceni	11	(2)
2013–2015	Gloria Popești-Leordeni	34	(12)
2015–2016	Dunărea Călărași	32	(25)
2016	Pandurii Târgu Jiu	9	(2)
2017	Concordia Chiajna	7	(2)
2017–2019	Dunărea Călărași	42	(25)
2019	→ Chindia Târgoviște (loan)	11	(3)
2019	Gloria Buzău	19	(10)
2020	Rapid București	6	(0)
2020–2021	Dunărea Călărași	25	(7)
2021–2022	Universitatea Cluj	14	(3)
2022–2023	Gloria Buzău	24	(4)
2023–2024	CSM Slatina	20	(5)
2024–	Gloria Bistrița	16	(1)
- * Club domestic league appearances and goals as of 13 December 2025

Valentin Marius Alexandru (born 17 September 1991) is a Romanian professional footballer who plays as a forward for Liga II club Gloria Bistrița.

== Honours ==
Victoria Brănești

- Liga II: 2009–10

Dunărea Călărași

- Liga II: 2017–18

Chindia Târgoviște

- Liga II: 2018–19

Gloria Bistrița

- Liga III: 2024–25

Individual

- Liga II top scorer: 2015–16 (25 goals)
