= Denis Ispas =

Romanian footballer

Personal information
- Full name: Denis Florentin Ispas
- Date of birth: 5 September 1993 (age 33)
- Place of birth: Târgoviște, Romania
- Height: 1.86 m (6 ft 1 in)
- Position: Defender

Team information
- Current team: Tunari
- Number: 4

Youth career
- –2012: Chindia Târgoviște

Senior career*
| Years | Team | Apps | (Gls) |
| 2012–2017 | Chindia Târgoviște | 76 | (1) |
| 2017–2018 | ACS Șirineasa | 8 | (1) |
| 2018 | Dunărea Călărași | 12 | (0) |
| 2019 | Farul Constanța | 14 | (0) |
| 2019–2020 | Turris Turnu Măgurele | 27 | (2) |
| 2021 | FC U Craiova | 12 | (0) |
| 2021–2023 | Universitatea Cluj | 49 | (2) |
| 2023–2024 | Concordia Chiajna | 15 | (3) |
| 2024 | Minaur Baia Mare | | |
| 2025 | Dunărea Ciocănești | | |
| 2026– | Tunari | 7 | (1) |
- * Club domestic league appearances and goals as of 25 April 2026

Denis Florentin Ispas (born 5 September 1993) is a Romanian professional footballer who plays as a defender for Liga II club Tunari.

== Honours ==
Chindia Târgoviște

- Liga III: 2014–15

ACS Șirineasa

- Liga III: 2017–18

FC U Craiova

- Liga II: 2020–21

Universitatea Cluj

- Cupa României runner-up: 2022–23
