= Ionuț Cioinac =

Romanian footballer

Personal information
- Full name: Ionuț Adrian Cioinac
- Date of birth: 14 January 1991 (age 35)
- Place of birth: Craiova, Romania
- Height: 1.83 m (6 ft 0 in)
- Positions: Defensive midfielder; centre-back

Team information
- Current team: Viitorul Dăești

Youth career
- –2008: Școala de Fotbal Gheorghe Popescu

Senior career*
Years	Team	Apps	(Gls)
2008–2012	Dunărea Galați	102	(2)
2012–2015	Fortuna Poiana Câmpina	13	(1)
2013	→ FCM Târgu Mureș (loan)	5	(0)
2014	→ Dinamo București (loan)	1	(0)
2015	Farul Constanța	7	(0)
2015	Unirea Tărlungeni	4	(0)
2015–2016	CS Podari	?	(?)
2016	Universitatea II Craiova	13	(1)
2017	Pandurii Târgu Jiu	14	(0)
2017–2019	Politehnica Iași	63	(2)
2019	Petrolul Ploiești	17	(2)
2020	Turris Turnu Măgurele	17	(1)
2021	ASU Politehnica Timișoara	7	(0)
2021	Unirea Constanța	3	(0)
2021–2022	CSM Reșița	24	(1)
2022	Flacăra Horezu	12	(3)
2023	Viitorul Dăești	?	(?)
Total		303	(13)
- * Club domestic league appearances and goals as of 14:32, 13 January 2023 (UTC)

Ionuț Adrian Cioinac (born 14 January 1991) is a Romanian professional footballer who plays as a midfielder for Viitorul Dăești. A versatile player, Cioinac plays mainly as a mainly as a defensive midfielder, but he has also been deployed on numerous occasions as a centre-back.

== Club career ==
After spending the first half of his career in the lower tiers of Romanian football, Cioinac made his Liga I debut while on loan at Dinamo București, on February 23, 2014, in 1–2 loss to Viitorul Constanța. At the end of the 2013–14 Liga I season he was released by Dinamo and returned to Fortuna Brazi.

=== Pandurii Târgu Jiu ===
After another two seasons in the Liga II, Cioinac returned to the top tier of Romanian football to sign with struggling Pandurii Târgu Jiu. Although he impressed here, Pandurii were relegated and the player soon left the club.

=== Politehnica Iași ===
Cioinac followed his departing manager from Pandurii Târgu Jiu, Flavius Stoican, and signed a one-year contract with fellow Liga I club Politehnica Iași. After a very strong first year with the Moldavian team in which they finished the league on sixth place, he signed another contract to keep him with the club for another two years.

== Honours ==
CSM Reșița

- Liga III: 2021–22
