= Emil Alexandrescu Stadium =

Stadium in Copou, Romania

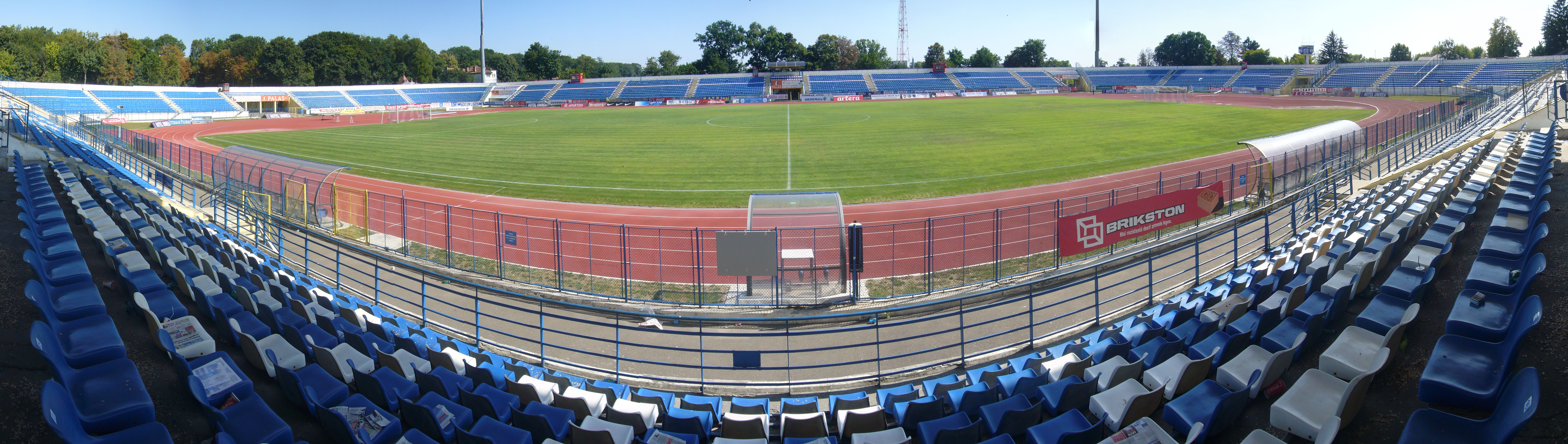
- The venue in 2009
- Interactive map of Emil Alexandrescu Stadium
- Location: Copou Park, Iași, Romania
- Coordinates: 47°11′04″N 27°33′40″E
- Owner: Municipality of Iași
- Operator: Politehnica Iași
- Capacity: 11,390 seated
- Surface: Grass
- Field size: 105 x 68m

Construction
- Opened: 23 August 1960
- Renovated: 2004, 2016

Tenant
- Politehnica Iași (1960–present)

The Emil Alexandrescu Stadium is a multi-purpose stadium in Iași, Romania. It is used mostly for football matches and is the home field of Politehnica Iași. The stadium is named after the former CSMS Iași player and Iași Mayor, Emil Alexandrescu. Its original capacity was 12,500 seats but after plastic seats were mounted the capacity was reduced to 11,390 seats. It is the 35th stadium in the country by capacity.

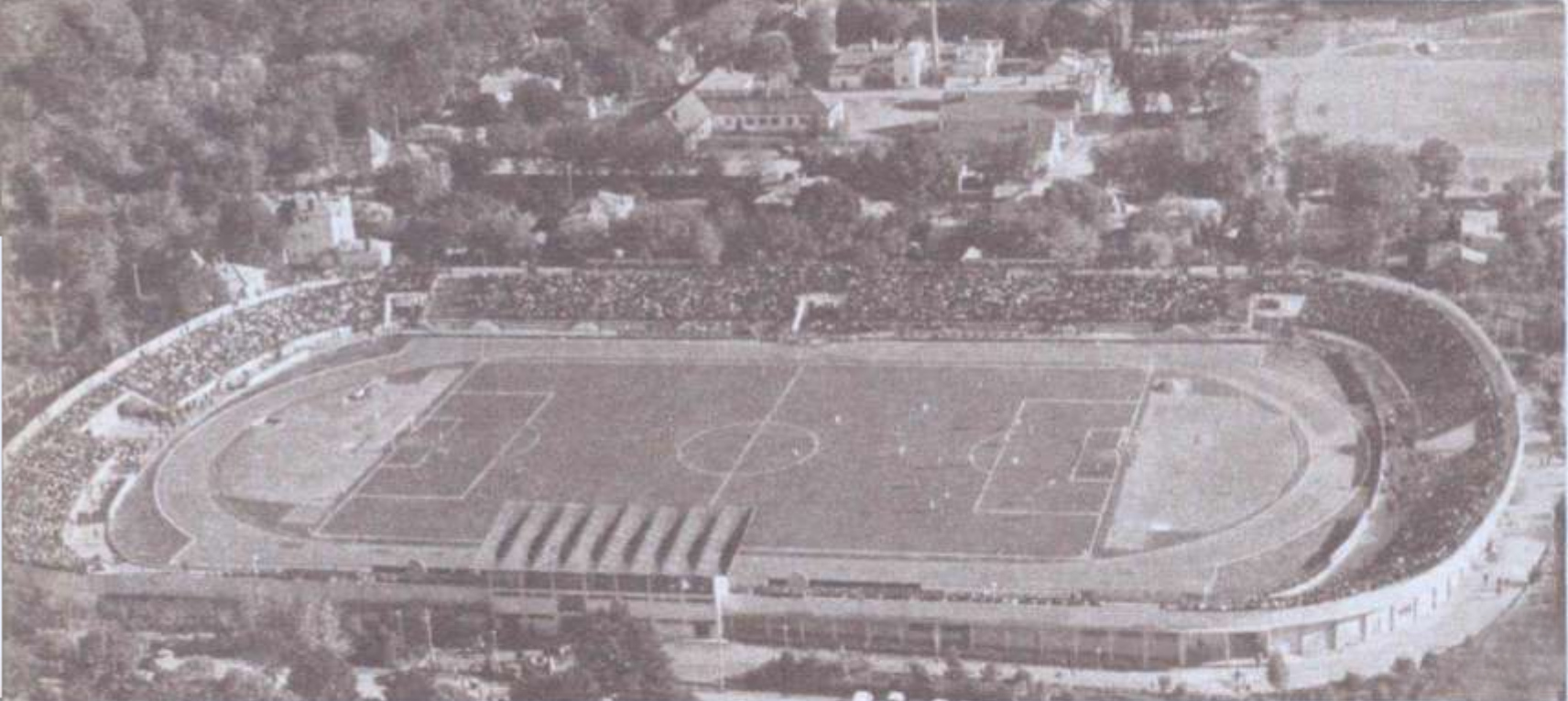
Aerial view of the stadium in 1967

== Events ==
=== Association football ===
International football matches
| Date | Competition | Home | Away | Score | Attendance |
|---|---|---|---|---|---|
| 14 July 2016 | UEFA Europa League | (Romania) Politehnica Iași | (Croatia) Hajduk Split | 2–2 | 8,004 |

== See also ==
- List of football stadiums in Romania
