= Ovidiu Mihalache =

Romanian footballer

Personal information
- Full name: Marius Ovidiu Mihalache
- Date of birth: 14 December 1984 (age 41)
- Place of birth: Holboca, Romania
- Height: 1.82 m (6 ft 0 in)
- Position: Defender

Youth career
- –2000: Politehnica Iaşi

Senior career*
Years	Team	Apps	(Gls)
2000–2002	Politehnica Iași	3	(0)
2002–2004	Viitorul Hârlău		
2004–2007	Auxerre Lugoj	23	(1)
2007–2013	Astra Ploiești	112	(9)
2013	Bihor Oradea	3	(0)
2013–2021	Politehnica Iași	198	(5)
2022	Flacăra Erbiceni		
2023–2025	USV Iași		

Managerial career
- 2025–2026: Politehnica Iași (assistant)
- * Club domestic league appearances and goals

Marius Ovidiu Mihalache (born 14 December 1984) is a former Romanian professional footballer who played as a defender.

== Honours ==
Politehnica Iași

- Liga II: 2013–14
- Divizia C: 2001–02

Auxerre Lugoj

- Divizia C: 2005–06

FC Ploiești

- Liga III: 2007–08

Flacăra Erbiceni

- Liga IV – Iași County: 2021–22

USV Iași

- Liga IV – Iași County: 2023–24
