= Ion Comșa Stadium =

Sports venue in Moldova

- Dunărea
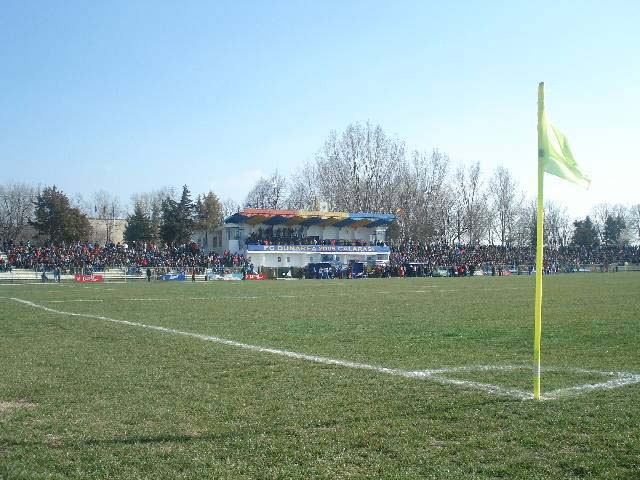
- The venue in 2009
- Interactive map of Ion Comșa Stadium
- Former names: Tineretului Stadium; Central Stadium
- Address: Str. Tudor Vladimirescu
- Location: Călărași, Romania
- Coordinates: 44°12′2.5″N 27°19′40.6″E
- Owner: Municipality of Călărași
- Operator: Dunărea Călărași
- Capacity: 6,000
- Surface: grass

Construction
- Opened: 1962
- Renovated: 2018

Tenant
- Dunărea Călărași (1962–present)

The Ion Comșa Stadium is a multi-use stadium in Călărași. It is the home ground of Dunărea Călărași. It holds 6,000 people.
