= FC Dunărea Călărași =

Romanian football club

Dunărea Călărași
- Full name: Asociația Fotbal Club; Dunărea 2005 Călărași
- Nicknames: Valahii (The Vlachs); Galben-albaștrii (The Yellow and Blues)
- Short name: Dunărea
- Founded: 1962; 64 years ago as Celuloza Călărași
- Ground: Ion Comșa
- Capacity: 10,400
- Owner(s): Călărași Municipality; Călărași County Council
- Chairman: Cătălin Farin
- Manager: Valeriu Petrescu
- League: Liga III
- 2025–26: Liga III, Seria II, 8th
- Website: afcdunarea.com
Home colours	Away colours

Asociația Fotbal Club Dunărea 2005 Călărași, commonly known as Dunărea Călărași (Romanian pronunciation: [ˈdunəre̯a kələˈraʃʲ]), is a Romanian professional football club from the city of Călărași, Călărași County, currently competing in Liga III, the third tier of the Romanian football league system.

Founded in 1962, the Vlachs were promoted to Liga I for the first time in their history during the 2017–18 season. They subsequently suffered consecutive relegations, first from Liga I at the end of the 2018–19 season and then from Liga II following the 2021–22 campaign.

== History ==
=== Celuloza Călărași (1962–1979) ===
Football made its appearance in the city from the Danube banks in 1919, with the founding of Ialomița Călărași, an amateur club that quickly became the main attraction of Sunday events—a day when the whole community gathered to enjoy their free time. In the following decades, other amateur clubs such as Tricolorul, Venus, FC Călărași, and Energia emerged and contributed to the development of local football. This steady evolution culminated in 1962, with the founding of the city’s first professional club, Celuloza Călărași.

Appearing quite late on the Romanian football scene, Celuloza did not have a rapid rise but grew steadily, year after year. In its first six years of existence, the club competed in the Bucharest Regional Championship. At the end of the 1967–68 season, Celuloza finished 1st in the East Series of the regional championship and was promoted to Divizia C.

In the third division, Celuloza competed in Series III and finished the 1968–69 season in 11th place, ensuring its presence in the following season as well. Over the next two seasons, the team achieved very good results, finishing 5th in 1969–70 and 9th in 1970–71. In 1971–72, Celuloza moved to Series IV and finished 5th once again. Then came a sensational 1972–73 season in Series V, at the end of which Celuloza was promoted for the first time in its history to Divizia B, securing promotion with an eight-point lead over Autobuzul București.

First Divizia B season was a good one for the Vlachs, which ended on the 11th place, result followed by other good rankings in the next seasons: 1974–75 – 8th and 1975–76 – 11th, then a seasons in which the team saved from relegation with some emotions: 1976–77 – 14th and finally Celuloza relegated back to Divizia C at the end of 1977–78, when the club finished only on the 15th place. After relegation Celuloza tried to fight for promotion, but failed, ending only on the 4th place.

=== Dunărea, an oscillating team (1979–1998) ===
In August 1979, Celuloza changed its name to Dunărea (lit. 'The Danube'), a name considered more representative and closer to the hearts of the spectators. The change also brought renewed ambition, with the primary goal being a return to the second division.

In its first season under the new name, Dunărea finished only in 3rd place, under the guidance of Ion Merlan. The squad included, among others, Niculescu, Răuță, Andrei, Boțoroagă, Dan Cristea, G. Voicu, Roibu, Alexandru Tănase, Marin Ștefan I, Marian Catană, Gheorghe Alexandru, Vasiluț, Ion Baraitaru, G. Pană, C. Ștefan, I. Dumitru, N. Nicolae, Victor Stelian, Aurel Ivan, N. Duma, and Marin Ștefan II.

Promotion came a year later, when the Vlachs, under the leadership of Ion Păunescu, achieved their goal. The team retained several key players from the previous season and added others such as Tudor, Isacov, Țuțuianu, V. Nicolae, Budac, D. Panciu, Cernica, Constantin, and Mihai. With this group, Dunărea secured promotion with an eight-point lead over Portul Constanța, the same margin as in their previous promotion.

Chronology of names
Name	Period
Celuloza Călărași	1962–1979
Dunărea Călărași	1979–1986
Oțelul Călărași	1986–1987
Dunărea Călărași	1987–1992
Sportul Călărași	1992–1994
Dunărea Călărași	1994–present

First Divizia B season, after the comeback, was a very good one, Dunărea finishing 7th out of 18, but the team could not keep their form relegating at the end of the 1983–84 season, finishing the last one, with only 22 points.

Returned to Divizia C, Dunărea promoted after a single season. Led by Vlad Marica and with players such as Petrișor Toma, Mocanu — Isacov, Berean, Mihăilă. M. Ștefan, Pană, Voicu, Marin, Vîlcu, Tănase — Virgil Bogatu, Mircea Banu, Valentin Nicolae, Zamfir, Gheorghe Vlase, Savu — Constantin Ștefan, Nelu Farin, S. Farin, Țuțuianu, Marian Catană and Panciu, the yellow and blues finished 1st, with 7 points ahead of Chimia Victoria Buzău.

Dunărea relegated then after only one season in Divizia B, finishing only on 16th place. After these seasons Dunărea started to be considered a team, somewhere between Divizia B and Divizia C, a reputation that followed the club throughout its existence. For the 1986–87 season the club name was changed to Oțelul and the team finished on 3rd place, then from 1987 the club has returned to the old name, Dunărea, auspicious change, the team promoting back into the second league at the end of the 1987–88 season. After only one season in Divizia B, Dunărea relegated again to Divizia C.

The yellow and blues continued their oscillating results finishing 8th at the end of 1989–90 Divizia C season, then promoting back to Divizia B, but only at the end of the 1991–92 season, season in which the club obtained the best performance in its entire history, a Cupa României quarter-final, being eliminated by Politehnica Timișoara, a team from Divizia A by 1–0 win at home and 0–2 lost away. In that edition, Politehnica Timișoara played the cup final against Steaua București. To qualify in the Quarter-finals, the team eliminated Gloria Bistriţa also a team from Divizia A by 3–2 and after they won against ASA 1962 Târgu Mureș, another team from Divizia A, by 2–1. In Divizia C table Dunărea was deducted 4 points and finally missed the promotion from financial reasons and changed its name again in the summer of 1992, this time to Sportul. Two seasons played the team under this name: 1992–93 – 4th and 1993–94 – 2nd. From the summer of 1994 the team changed back its name to Dunărea and promoted back to Divizia B after 5 seasons, finishing 2nd at 8 points from Oțelul Târgoviște and 6 points ahead of Astra Ploiești.

The Vlachs remained at this level for 3 seasons: 1995–96 – 10th, 1996–97 – 9th and 1997–98 – 17th.

=== Liga III years (1998–2015) ===
After relegation, Dunărea struggled to come back, but without much success, following the darkest period in the history of the club with 17 years in the Liga III without any season in the Liga II and with some financial problems also, around 2005.

Between 1998 and 2005, due to poor financial situation Dunărea began to blaze somewhere in the middle of the third league rankings: 1998–99 – 13th, 1999–2000 – 7th, 2000–01 – 8th, 2001–02 – 6th, 2002–03 – 7th and 2003–04 – 8th. In 2005 there has been a restructuring of the club from a legal and even financial point of view and the results have begun to appear: 2004–05 – 3rd and 2005–06 – 2nd. But after this short period in which the club showed that it can fight for promotion, followed a new period of contrasting results: 2006–07 – 8th, 2007–08 – 13th, 2008–09 – 6th, 2009–10 – 8th, 2010–11 – 4th, 2011–12 – 12th. In this period Dunărea did not seem to have a serious goal, except to stay somewhere in the upper part of the Liga III and even the bringing of Ion Moldovan, an experienced coach, in 2007 didn't resolve too much.

From 2012 the yellow and blues started to look again as a team that is capable to promote with 2 4th place in the 2012–13 and 2013–14 seasons. In 2015 the ex-international player Ionel Ganea was hired as the new manager of the team and with important players for this level, like: Constantin Bumbac and Valentin Alexandru the team achieved, at the end of the season, the promotion to Liga II after 17 years of waiting.

=== Golden Age of Dunărea (2015–present) ===
After the promotion Dunărea made an exceptional first Liga II season and finished on the 2nd place, at only three points from the leader, Rapid București and qualified for the promotion play-off where it played against 2nd place from the second series of Liga II, UTA Arad. In the first match, played at Călărași Dunărea won 3-1 and the dream of Liga I was more present than ever, on the banks of the Danube, but the second match of the play-off was a nightmare, the Vlachs lost 1–4 at Arad and remained in the Liga II for another season. Also during this season Ionel Ganea was changed with another ex-international player, Adrian Mihalcea.

The 2016–17 Liga II season introduced a new single-series format. In that campaign, Dunărea Călărași finished seventh out of 20 teams. During the summer of 2017, Adrian Mihalcea was replaced as manager by Adrian Iencsi, who in turn was succeeded after one round by Dan Alexa. Following Alexa’s appointment, the club improved significantly, moving from the lower part of the table to first place by the winter break, one point ahead of FC Hermannstadt and seven ahead of Chindia Târgoviște. The team then went on an extended unbeaten run that placed promotion into contention. The second half of the season continued that form, with Dunărea recording a 32-match unbeaten streak, including 13 consecutive victories. Despite competition from FC Hermannstadt, which also remained unbeaten for an extended period and reached the 2017–18 Cupa României final, Dunărea finished first in Liga II and secured promotion to Liga I for the first time in the club’s history, as well as the first top-flight promotion for a club from Călărași County.

== Ground ==
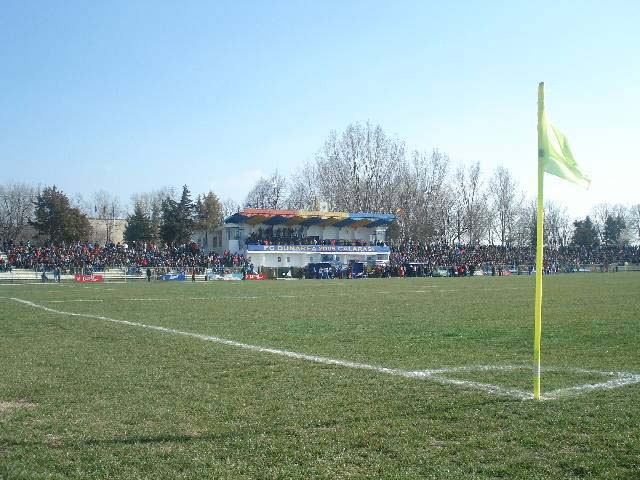
Stadionul Ion Comșa

Dunărea plays its home matches on Stadionul Ion Comșa from Călărași, with a capacity of 10,400 seats. In the late spring of 2018 when the promotion to Liga I was safe, it was announced that the stadium will be renovated and modernized. The works have begun in the first half of June and included a completely change of the pitch, a partial change of the stands structure and a potential acquisition of a floodlight installation.

== Honours ==
=== Domestic ===
==== Leagues ====
- Liga II
  - Winners (1): 2017–18
  - Runners-up (1): 2015–16
- Liga III
  - Winners (6): 1972–73, 1980–81, 1984–85, 1987–88, 1991–92, 2014–15
  - Runners-up (4): 1993–94, 1994–95, 2005–06, 2023–24

== Players ==
=== First-team squad ===
As of 8 January 2025

Note: Flags indicate national team as defined under FIFA eligibility rules; some limited exceptions apply. Players may hold more than one non-FIFA nationality.

No.	Pos.	Nation	Player
2	DF	ROU	Robert Andreescu
3	DF	ROU	Marian Tudor
4	MF	ROU	Alexandru Sârbu
5	DF	BRA	Marcus Diniz
7	MF	ROU	Marian Apostol
9	MF	ROU	Andrei Zaharia
10	MF	ROU	Marian Obedeanu
12	GK	ROU	Alexandru Costache
13	MF	ROU	Luca Oprea

No.	Pos.	Nation	Player
14	MF	ROU	Denis Cârciag
15	DF	ROU	Sebastian Burlacu (on loan from Farul)
16	DF	ROU	Antonio Vlad
17	MF	ROU	Mihai Țicu
18	MF	ROU	David Micu
19	FW	ROU	Luis Nițu
20	MF	ROU	Călin Mușat
99	GK	ROU	Cosmin Răduț

=== Out on loan ===
Note: Flags indicate national team as defined under FIFA eligibility rules; some limited exceptions apply. Players may hold more than one non-FIFA nationality.

No. / Pos. / Nation / Player	No. / Pos. / Nation / Player

== Club officials ==
=== Board of directors ===
Role	Name
Owner	(Romania) Călărași Municipality
President	(Romania) Cătălin Farin
Vice-President	(Romania) Eduard Grama
Sportind director	(Romania) Alexandru Dincă
Youth Center Manager	(Romania) Mirel Condei
Team manager	(Romania) Cătălin Farin
Press Officer	(Romania) Cătălin Nițu

=== Current technical staff ===
Role	Name
Manager	(Romania) Valeriu Petrescu
Assistant coach	(Romania) Victor Petre
Goalkeeping coach	(Romania) Gabriel Popa
Fitness coach	(Romania) Marius Milea
Club doctor	(Romania) Lilian Stelescu
Masseur	(Romania) Pavel Hanciuc
Storeman	(Romania) Alexandru Munteanu

== Former managers ==
- (Romania) Spiridon Niculescu (1976–1977)
- (Romania) Ion Merlan (1979–1980)
- (Romania) Ion Păunescu (1980–1981)
- (Romania) Vasile Stancu (1981–1983)
- (Romania) Vladimir Marica (1984–1985)
- (Romania) Dumitru Antonescu (1985–1987)
- (Romania) Dudu Georgescu (1994–1995)
- (Romania) Ion Moldovan (2007)
- (Romania) Gabriel Stan (2008–2009)
- (Romania) Valeriu Petrescu (2009–2012)
- (Romania) Virgil Bogatu (2012–2013)
- (Romania) Mirel Condei (2013)
- (Romania) Ion Răuță (2014–2015)
- (Romania) Ionel Ganea (2015–2016)
- (Romania) Adrian Mihalcea (2016–2017)
- (Romania) Adrian Iencsi (2017)
- (Romania) Dan Alexa (2017–2019)
- (Romania) Cristian Pustai (2019–2021)
- (Romania) Mirel Condei (2021)
- (Romania) Marius Milea (2021)
- (Romania) Virgil Bogatu (2021)
- (Romania) Marius Păun (2021–2022)
- (Romania) Gheorghe Mihali (2022–2023)
- (Romania) Marius Păun (2023–2024)

== League history ==
Season	Tier	Division	Place	Cupa României
2026–27	3	Liga III	TBD	Third round
2025–26	3	Liga III (Series III)	8th	
2024–25	3	Liga III (Series III)	2nd	
2023–24	3	Liga III (Series III)	2nd	
2022–23	3	Liga III (Series III)	5th	
2021–22	2	Liga II	18th (R)	Round of 16
2020–21	2	Liga II	4th	Quarter-finals
2019–20	2	Liga II	12th	Fourth Round
2018–19	1	Liga I	13th (R)	Quarter-finals
2017–18	2	Liga II	1st (C, P)	Fourth Round
2016–17	2	Liga II	7th	Fourth Round
2015–16	2	Liga II (Seria I)	2nd	Fourth Round
2014–15	3	Liga III (Seria II)	1st (C, P)	Fourth Round
2013–14	3	Liga III (Seria II)	5th	Third Round
2012–13	3	Liga III (Seria II)	5th	Second Round
2011–12	3	Liga III (Seria II)	12th	Fourth Round
2010–11	3	Liga III (Seria II)	4th	First Round
2009–10	3	Liga III (Seria II)	8th	
2008–09	3	Liga III (Seria II)	6th	

Season	Tier	Division	Place	Cupa României
2007–08	3	Liga III (Seria II)	13th	
2006–07	3	Liga III (Seria II)	8th	
2005–06	3	Divizia C	2nd	
2004–05	3	Divizia C	3rd	
2003–04	3	Divizia C	8th	
2002–03	3	Divizia C (Seria III)	7th	
2001–02	3	Divizia C	6th	
2000–01	3	Divizia C	8th	
1999–00	3	Divizia C	7th	
1998–99	3	Divizia C	13th	
1997–98	2	Divizia B (Seria I)	17th (R)	Round of 32
1996–97	2	Divizia B (Seria I)	9th	Round of 16
1995–96	2	Divizia B (Seria I)	10th	Round of 32
1994–95	3	Divizia C	2nd (P)	
1993–94	3	Divizia C	2nd	Round of 32
1992–93	3	Divizia C (Seria II)	4th	
1991–92	3	Divizia C (Seria VI)	1st (C)	Quarter-finals
1989–90	3	Divizia C (Seria IV)	8th	
1988–89	2	Divizia B (Seria II)	17th (R)	
