= 2020–21 FC Dinamo București season =

Dinamo București
2020–21 season
- Head coaches: Gheorghe Mulțescu (until 26 August); Cosmin Contra (26 August-3 December); Ionel Gane (3 December-15 March); Gheorghe Mulțescu (15 March-14 April); Dušan Uhrin Jr. (from 14 April)
- Stadium: Arena Națională, Dinamo
- Liga I: 12th
- Cupa României: Semifinals
- Top goalscorer: League: Sorescu (7); All: Sorescu (8)
Home colours	Away colours

The 2020–21 season was the 72nd season in Dinamo București's history, all of them played in the top-flight of Romanian football. Dinamo participated in the Liga I and the Cupa României.

== Transfers ==
=== Transfers in ===
Date	Position	Name	From	Fee	Ref.
18 August 2020	CM	(Romania) Vlad Achim	(Romania) Viitorul Constanța	Free	
25 August 2020	CM	(Poland) Janusz Gol	(Poland) Cracovia	Free	
29 August 2020	FW	(Slovakia) Adam Nemec	(Cyprus) Pafos	Free	
4 September 2020	DF	(Venezuela) Alexander David González	(Spain) Mirandés	Free	
4 September 2020	DF	(Spain) Isma López	(Spain) Tenerife	Free	
7 September 2020	FW	(Spain) Borja Valle	(Spain) Deportivo de La Coruña	Free	
16 September 2020	GK	(Spain) René Román	(Spain) UD Almería	Free	
2 October 2020	DM	(Romania) Paul Anton	(Russia) FC Krylia Sovetov Samara	Free	
5 October 2020	LB	(Romania) Andrei Radu	(Romania) CFR Cluj	Free	
7 October 2020	FW	(Senegal) Magaye Gueye	(Azerbaijan) Qarabağ FK	Free	
8 October 2020	DF	(Senegal) Abdoulaye Ba	(Spain) Rayo Vallecano	Free	
8 October 2020	MF	(Spain) Aleix García	(England) Manchester City F.C.	Free	
8 January 2021	MF	(Romania) Andrei Blejdea	(Romania) FC Argeș	Free	
22 January 2021	MF	(Curaçao) Gevaro Nepomuceno	(England) Halifax Town	Free	
23 January 2021	DF	(Romania) Steliano Filip	(Greece) AEL	Free	
8 February 2021	GK	(Norway) Gudmund Kongshavn	(Norway) Aalesund	Free	
16 February 2021	FW	(Romania) Giani Stere	(Romania) CSM Deva	Free	
1 April 2021	DF	(Spain) Raúl Albentosa	(Bulgaria) CSKA Sofia	Free	
7 April 2021	FW	(Nigeria) Joseph Akpala	(Belgium) Oostende	Free	

=== Transfers out ===
Date	Position	Name	To	Fee	Ref.
7 August 2020	RB	(Romania) Szabolcs Kilyén	(Romania) Viitorul Constanța	Released	
7 August 2020	LB	(Slovakia) Lukáš Skovajsa	(Czech Republic) Dynamo České Budějovice	Released	
7 August 2020	RB	(Slovakia) Kristián Koštrna	(Slovakia) Spartak Trnava	Released	
7 August 2020	DM	(Mali) Mamoutou N'Diaye	(Spain) Marino	Released	
7 August 2020	FW	(Italy) Mattia Montini	(Romania) Astra Giurgiu	Released	
7 August 2020	FW	(Serbia) Slavko Perović	Unattached	Released	
8 August 2020	CM	(Romania) Valentin Lazăr	(Qatar) Al-Shahania	Released	
8 August 2020	CM	(Croatia) Filip Mrzljak	(Russia) Ufa	Released	
16 September 2020	DF	(Romania) Mihai Popescu	(Scotland) Heart of Midlothian	Undisclosed	
19 September 2020	GK	(Romania) Cătălin Straton	(Romania) FCSB	Undisclosed	
4 December 2020	DF	(Spain) Isma López	(Spain) Racing de Santander	Released	
5 December 2020	GK	(Spain) René Román	(Spain) Atlético Baleares	Released	
22 December 2020	DF	(Venezuela) Alexander David González	(Spain) Málaga	Free	
22 December 2020	DF	(Senegal) Abdoulaye Ba	(Portugal) Moreirense	Free	
30 December 2020	FW	(Spain) Borja Valle	(Spain) Oviedo	Free	
15 January 2021	CM	(Spain) Aleix García	(Spain) Eibar	Free	
28 January 2021	DF	(Romania) Andrei Sin	(Romania) Viitorul Pandurii Târgu Jiu	Free	
9 March 2021	FW	(Senegal) Magaye Gueye	(Greece) Anagennisi Karditsa	Released	

=== Loans in ===
Date	Position	Name	From	End date	Ref.
8 September 2020	FW	(Spain) Juan Cámara	(Poland) Jagiellonia Białystok	15 January 2021	
11 September 2020	FW	(Spain) Tomás Mejías	(England) Middlesbrough	15 January 2021	
8 February 2021	AM	(Sweden) Jonathan Morsay	(Italy) Chievo	30 June 2021	

=== Loans out ===
Date	Position	Name	To	End date	Ref.
26 June 2020	DF	(Romania) Alin Dudea	(Romania) CSM Reșița	30 June 2021	
20 August 2020	GK	(Romania) Ștefan Fara	(Romania) Farul Constanța	30 June 2021	
30 August 2020	GK	(Romania) Dragoș Petrișor	(Romania) Aerostar Bacău	30 June 2021	
7 September 2020	FW	(Romania) Daniel Popa	(Romania) Chindia Târgoviște	30 June 2021	
23 September 2020	FW	(Romania) Mihai Neicuțescu	(Romania) Chindia Târgoviște	30 June 2021	
10 October 2020	DF	(Romania) Dan Tălmaciu	(Romania) Politehnica Iași	31 December 2020	

== Competitions ==
Win Draw Loss

=== Overview ===
Competition	First match	Last match	Starting round	Final position	Record							
Competition	First match	Last match	Starting round	Final position	Pld	W	D	L	GF	GA	GD	Win %
Liga I	24 August 2020	19 May 2021	Matchday 1	Matchday 39	39	12	8	19	37	49	−12	30.77
Cupa României	28 November 2020	11 May 2021	Round of 32	Semifinals	5	4	0	1	8	2	+6	80.00
Total					44	16	8	20	45	51	−6	36.36

Last updated: 19 May 2021
Source: Competitions

=== Liga I ===
The Liga I fixture list was announced in August 2020.

==== Regular season ====
===== Table =====
Pos	Team	Pld	W	D	L	GF	GA	GD	Pts	Qualification
12	Voluntari	30	8	8	14	32	40	−8	32	Qualification for the Play-out round
13	Viitorul Constanța	30	6	13	11	36	37	−1	31	Qualification for the Play-out round
14	Dinamo București	30	7	6	17	26	41	−15	27	Qualification for the Play-out round
15	Hermannstadt	30	5	11	14	28	40	−12	26	Qualification for the Play-out round
16	Politehnica Iași	30	7	4	19	29	64	−35	25	Qualification for the Play-out round

Source: LPF (in Romanian), Soccerway
Rules for classification: 1) Points; 2) Head-to-head points; 3) Head-to-head goal difference; 4) Head-to-head goals scored; 5) Goal difference; 6) Goals scored; 7) Play-off.

===== Results summary =====
Overall								Home						Away					
Pld	W	D	L	GF	GA	GD	Pts	W	D	L	GF	GA	GD	W	D	L	GF	GA	GD
30	7	6	17	26	41	−15	27	3	4	8	14	21	−7	4	2	9	12	20	−8

Last updated: 9 April 2021.
Source: Liga I

===== Results by round =====
Round	1	2	3	4	5	6	7	8	9	10	11	12	13	14	15	16	17	18	19	20	21	22	23	24	25	26	27	28	29	30
Ground	H	A	H	A	H	A	H	A	A	H	H	A	H	H	A	A	H	A	H	A	H	A	H	A	H	A	H	A	A	H
Result	D	L	D	W	L	L	L	L	L	D	W	W	W	L	D	W	L	L	W	W	L	L	D	L	L	D	L	L	L	L
Position	7	12	12	9	12	14	14	14	15	15	14	12	9	10	11	8	11	11	11	9	10	11	11	12	13	13	14	14	14	14

Updated to match(es) played on 9 April 2021. Source: Liga I
A = Away; H = Home; W = Win; D = Draw; L = Loss

==== Matches ====
24 August 2020 1	Dinamo București	1–1	Hermannstadt	Bucharest
21:00 EEST (UTC+3)	Sorescu 60' (pen.)		32' Jô Santos	Stadium: Arena Națională; Attendance: None (Behind closed doors); Referee: István Kovács (Carei)

31 August 2020 2	Chindia Târgoviște	1–0	Dinamo București	Ploiești
21:00 EEST (UTC+3)	Florea 45+2'			Stadium: Ilie Oană; Attendance: None (Behind closed doors); Referee: Horațiu Feșnic (Cluj-Napoca)

11 September 2020 3	Dinamo București	1–1	Botoșani	Bucharest
21:00 EEST (UTC+3)	Valle 71'		37' (o.g.) López	Stadium: Dinamo; Attendance: None (Behind closed doors); Referee: Marius Avram (Bucharest)

21 September 2020 4	Gaz Metan Mediaș	1–3	Dinamo București	Mediaș
21:00 EEST (UTC+3)	Dumitru 89'		48' González; 74' Sorescu; 83' Cámara	Stadium: Stadionul Gaz Metan; Attendance: None (Behind closed doors); Referee: Marcel Bîrsan (Bucharest)

28 September 2020 5	Dinamo București	0–1	UTA	Bucharest
21:00 EEST (UTC+3)			Hora 42' (pen.)	Stadium: Dinamo; Attendance: None (Behind closed doors); Referee: Sebastian Colțescu (Craiova)

3 October 2020 6	FCSB	3–2	Dinamo București	Bucharest
21:00 EEST (UTC+3)	Tănase 8' 76' (pen.); Cristea 17'		26' (pen.) Valle; 42' Nemec	Stadium: Arena Națională; Attendance: None (Behind closed doors); Referee: Radu Petrescu (Bucharest)

18 October 2020 7	Dinamo București	0–1	Universitatea Craiova	Bucharest
21:30 EEST (UTC+3)			28' (pen.) Cicâldău	Stadium: Arena Națională; Attendance: None (Behind closed doors); Referee: Horațiu Feșnic (Cluj-Napoca)

24 October 2020 8	Sepsi Sfântu Gheorghe	2–0	Dinamo București	Sfântu Gheorghe
21:45 EEST (UTC+3)	Achahbar 29'; Fülöp 77'			Stadium: Municipal; Attendance: None (Behind closed doors); Referee: Ovidiu Hațegan (Arad)

8 November 2020 10	Viitorul Constanța	2–1	Dinamo București	Ovidiu
21:00 EET (UTC+2)	Dobrosavlevici 53'; Luckassen 56'		64' Valle	Stadium: Viitorul; Attendance: None (Behind closed doors); Referee: István Kovács (Carei)

14 November 2020 9	Dinamo București	1–1	Astra Giurgiu	Bucharest
21:00 EET (UTC+2)	Gueye 57'		47' Gheorghe	Stadium: Dinamo; Attendance: None (Behind closed doors); Referee: Florin Chivulete (Bucharest)

20 November 2020 11	Dinamo București	3–0	Voluntari	Bucharest
20:30 EET (UTC+2)	Anton 60'; Valle 67', 87'			Stadium: Dinamo; Attendance: None (Behind closed doors); Referee: Ovidiu Hațegan (Arad)

4 December 2020 12	Argeș	0–1	Dinamo București	Pitești
20:30 EET (UTC+2)			64' Cámara	Stadium: Nicolae Dobrin; Attendance: None (Behind closed doors); Referee: Marian Barbu (Făgăraș)

11 December 2020 13	Dinamo București	4–1	Politehnica Iași	Bucharest
20:30 EET (UTC+2)	Sorescu 16' (pen.); Nemec 58'; Anton 77'; Gueye 86'		4' Platini	Stadium: Dinamo; Attendance: None (Behind closed doors); Referee: Horațiu Feșnic (Cluj-Napoca)

17 December 2020 14	Dinamo București	0–2	CFR Cluj	Bucharest
20:30 EET (UTC+2)			14' Debeljuh; 44' (pen.) Păun	Stadium: Dinamo; Attendance: None (Behind closed doors); Referee: Marius Avram (Bucharest)

20 December 2020 15	Academica Clinceni	1–1	Dinamo București	Călărași
21:00 EET (UTC+2)	Chunchukov 76'		65' Anton	Stadium: Ion Comșa; Attendance: None (Behind closed doors); Referee: Ovidiu Hațegan (Arad)

13 January 2021 16	Hermannstadt	0–2	Dinamo București	Mediaș
19:00 EET (UTC+2)			30' Fabbrini; 33' Nemec	Stadium: Gaz Metan; Attendance: None (Behind closed doors); Referee: Adrian Cojocaru (Galați)

16 January 2021 17	Dinamo București	0–1	Chindia Târgoviște	Bucharest
20:00 EET (UTC+2)			64' Berisha	Stadium: Dinamo; Attendance: None (Behind closed doors); Referee: Horațiu Feșnic (Cluj-Napoca)

24 January 2021 18	Botoșani	4–0	Dinamo București	Botoșani
20:00 EET (UTC+2)	Keyta 1', 37' (pen.); Ongenda 23'; Haruț 64'			Stadium: Municipal; Attendance: None (Behind closed doors); Referee: István Kovács (Carei)

27 January 2021 19	Dinamo București	2–1	Gaz Metan Mediaș	Bucharest
20:00 EET (UTC+2)	Gueye 32'; Puljić 43'		7' Ricardo Valente	Stadium: Dinamo; Attendance: None (Behind closed doors); Referee: Marcel Bîrsan (Bucharest)

31 January 2021 20	UTA	0–1	Dinamo București	Arad
20:45 EET (UTC+2)			9' (pen.) Sorescu	Stadium: Francisc von Neuman; Attendance: None (Behind closed doors); Referee: Cătălin Popa (Pitești)

3 February 2021 21	Dinamo București	0–1	FCSB	Bucharest
20:45 EET (UTC+2)			8' Tănase	Stadium: Dinamo; Attendance: None (Behind closed doors); Referee: Sebastian Colțescu (Craiova)

6 February 2021 22	Universitatea Craiova	1–0	Dinamo București	Craiova
21:00 EET (UTC+2)	Ivan 26'			Stadium: Ion Oblemenco; Attendance: None (Behind closed doors); Referee: Florin Andrei (Târgu Mureș)

13 February 2021 23	Dinamo București	0–0	Sepsi Sfântu Gheorghe	Bucharest
21:00 EET (UTC+2)				Stadium: Dinamo; Attendance: None (Behind closed doors); Referee: Florin Chivulete (Bucharest)

21 February 2021 24	Astra Giurgiu	2–0	Dinamo București	Giurgiu
20:30 EET (UTC+2)	Gheorghe 36'; Stahl 40'			Stadium: Marin Anastasovici; Attendance: None (Behind closed doors); Referee: Iulian Călin (Ștefănești, Argeș)

26 February 2021 25	Dinamo București	0–5	Viitorul Constanța	Bucharest
20:30 EET (UTC+2)			4' Jô Santos; 16' (pen.) Ganea; 44', 81' Ciobanu; 79' Tsoumou	Stadium: Dinamo; Attendance: None (Behind closed doors); Referee: Adrian Cojocaru (Galați)

8 March 2021 26	Voluntari	1–1	Dinamo București	Voluntari
20:30 EET (UTC+2)	Betancor 52'		19' Filip	Stadium: Anghel Iordănescu; Attendance: None (Behind closed doors); Referee: Sorin Antonie (Bucharest)

15 March 2021 27	Dinamo București	1–2	Argeș	Bucharest
20:30 EET (UTC+2)	Achim 71'		28' Grecu; 84' (pen.) Malele	Stadium: Dinamo; Attendance: None (Behind closed doors); Referee: Ionuţ Coza (Bucharest)

20 March 2021 28	Politehnica Iași	1–0	Dinamo București	Iași
21:30 EET (UTC+2)	Đuranović 62'			Stadium: Emil Alexandrescu; Attendance: None (Behind closed doors); Referee: Viorel Flueran (Craiova)

5 April 2021 29	CFR Cluj	1–0	Dinamo București	Cluj Napoca
20:30 EEST (UTC+3)	Omrani 80'			Stadium: Dr. Constantin Rădulescu; Attendance: None (Behind closed doors); Referee: Marcel Bîrsan (Bucharest)

9 April 2021 30	Dinamo București	1–3	Academica Clinceni	Bucharest
20:30 EEST (UTC+3)	Grigore 73'		4' Rusescu; 11' Cordea; 17' Moulin	Stadium: Dinamo; Attendance: None (Behind closed doors); Referee: Horațiu Feșnic (Cluj-Napoca)

==== Play-out ====
===== Table =====
Pos	Team	Pld	W	D	L	GF	GA	GD	Pts	Qualification or relegation
7	Chindia Târgoviște	9	4	4	1	7	3	+4	36	Qualification to European competition play-offs
8	UTA Arad (Note: UTA Arad failed to obtain a UEFA licence.)	9	4	1	4	7	9	−2	32 (Note: Points in the regular season: UTA 37, Gaz 33, Viitorul 31)	
9	Gaz Metan Mediaș (Note: Gaz Metan Mediaș failed to obtain a UEFA licence.)	9	4	3	2	15	10	+5	32	
10	Viitorul Constanța (E, M)	9	5	1	3	9	4	+5	32	Merged with Farul Constanța after qualification to European competition play-offs
11	Argeș Pitești	9	3	2	4	10	7	+3	31 (Note: Points w/o rounding: Argeș 31.0, Dinamo 30.5)	
12	Dinamo București	9	5	2	2	11	8	+3	31	
13	Voluntari (O)	9	3	3	3	6	7	−1	28	Qualification for the relegation play-offs
14	Hermannstadt (R)	9	4	1	4	6	9	−3	26	Qualification for the relegation play-offs
15	Astra Giurgiu (R)	9	1	2	6	6	12	−6	24	Relegation to 2021–22 Liga II
16	Politehnica Iași (R)	9	2	1	6	7	15	−8	20	Relegation to 2021–22 Liga II

Source: Soccerway, FRF (in Romanian), LPF (in Romanian)
Rules for classification: 1) Points; 2) Points without rounding; 3) Points in the regular season; 4) Goal difference; 5) Goals scored; 6) Play-off (only if needed to decide teams for relegation). (Note: only criteria 4 and 5 are applied to establish the classification during the competition.)
(E) Eliminated; (M) Merged with another team; (O) Play-off winners; (R) Relegated

===== Results summary =====
Overall								Home						Away					
Pld	W	D	L	GF	GA	GD	Pts	W	D	L	GF	GA	GD	W	D	L	GF	GA	GD
9	5	2	2	11	8	+3	17	2	1	1	4	1	+3	3	1	1	7	7	0

Last updated: 19 May 2021.
Source: Liga I

===== Results by round =====
Round	1	2	3	4	5	6	7	8	9
Ground	A	H	A	H	A	A	H	A	H
Result	D	L	L	W	W	W	W	W	D
Position	14	14	15	14	14	11	11	10	12

Updated to match(es) played on 16 May 2021. Source: Liga I
A = Away; H = Home; W = Win; D = Draw; L = Loss

==== Matches ====
16 April 2021 1	Astra Giurgiu	0–0	Dinamo București	Giurgiu
20:30 EEST (UTC+3)				Stadium: Marin Anastasovici; Attendance: None (Behind closed doors); Referee: Ovidiu Hațegan (Arad)

20 April 2021 2	Dinamo București	0–1	UTA	Bucharest
21:30 EEST (UTC+3)			34' Miculescu	Stadium: Dinamo; Attendance: None (Behind closed doors); Referee: Florin Andrei (Târgu Mureș)

23 April 2021 3	Gaz Metan Mediaș	4–1	Dinamo București	Mediaș
20:30 EEST (UTC+3)	Morar 14'; Valente 29'; Deaconu 39'; Chamed 88' (pen.)		35' Sorescu	Stadium: Stadionul Gaz Metan; Attendance: None (Behind closed doors); Referee: Iulian Călin (Ștefănești, Argeș)

29 April 2021 4	Dinamo București	2–0	Voluntari	Bucharest
17:00 EEST (UTC+3)	Bejan 74'; Nemec 86'			Stadium: Dinamo; Attendance: None (Behind closed doors); Referee: Ovidiu Hațegan (Arad)

2 May 2021 5	Viitorul Constanța	1–2	Dinamo București	Ovidiu
18:30 EEST (UTC+3)	Jô Santos 88'		62' Morsay; 73' Albentosa	Stadium: Viitorul; Attendance: None (Behind closed doors); Referee: Sebastian Colțescu (Craiova)

5 May 2021 6	Politehnica Iași	1–2	Dinamo București	Iași
16:30 EEST (UTC+3)	Zajmović 42'		21' Sorescu; 54' Morsay	Stadium: Emil Alexandrescu; Attendance: None (Behind closed doors); Referee: Horațiu Feșnic (Cluj-Napoca)

8 May 2021 7	Dinamo București	2–0	Hermannstadt	Bucharest
21:15 EEST (UTC+3)	Anton 34' (pen.), 90+3' (pen.)			Stadium: Dinamo; Attendance: None (Behind closed doors); Referee: Lucian Rusandu (Sfântu Gheorghe)

16 May 2021 8	Argeș	1–2	Dinamo București	Pitești
16:30 EEST (UTC+3)	Ndiaye 59'		12' Mihaiu; 82' Sorescu	Stadium: Nicolae Dobrin; Attendance: None (Behind closed doors); Referee: Andrei Chivulete (Bucharest)

20 May 2021 9	Dinamo București	0–0	Chindia Târgoviște	Bucharest
20:30 EEST (UTC+3)				Stadium: Dinamo; Attendance: None (Behind closed doors); Referee: Adrian Cojocaru (Galați)

=== Cupa României ===
28 November 2020 Round of 32	Dinamo București	3–0	Viitorul Constanța	Bucharest
20:45 EET (UTC+2)	Fabbrini 11', 89'; Sorescu 14'			Stadium: Dinamo; Attendance: None (Behind closed doors); Referee: Marius Avram (Bucharest)

10 February 2021 Round of 16	Dinamo București	1–0	FCSB	Bucharest
20:30 EET (UTC+2)	Nemec 55'			Stadium: Dinamo; Attendance: None (Behind closed doors); Referee: Ovidiu Hațegan (Arad)

4 March 2021 Quarterfinals	Dunărea Călărași	1–3	Dinamo București	Călărași
20:30 EET (UTC+2)	Fotescu 67'		32', 44' Anton; 62' Bejan	Stadium: Ion Comșa; Attendance: None (Behind closed doors); Referee: George Găman (Craiova)

13 April 2021 Semifinals Leg 1	Astra Giurgiu	1–0	Dinamo București	Giurgiu
19:00 EEST (UTC+3)	Krpić 4'			Stadium: Marin Anastasovici; Attendance: None (Behind closed doors); Referee: Sebastian Colțescu (Craiova)

13 May 2021 Semifinals Leg 2	Dinamo București	1–0 (4–5 p)	Astra Giurgiu	Bucharest
20:15 EEST (UTC+3)	Radu 89'			Stadium: Dinamo; Attendance: None (Behind closed doors); Referee: Cătălin Popa (Pitești)
	Penalties
	Albentosa (penalty scored); Fabbrini (penalty scored); Anton (penalty scored); Grigore (penalty scored); Mihaiu (penalty missed); Nepomuceno (penalty missed)		(penalty scored) Krpić; (penalty scored) Wüthrich; (penalty missed) Gheorghe; (penalty scored) Čanađija; (penalty scored) Jovanović; (penalty scored) Raspopović

== Statistics ==
=== Appearances ===
Players with no appearances not included in the list.

As of match played 19 May 2021

No.	Pos.	Nat.	Name	Liga I		Cupa României		Total	
No.	Pos.	Nat.	Name	Apps	Starts	Apps	Starts	Apps	Starts
1	GK	(Norway)	Gudmund Kongshavn	5	5	1	1	6	6
2	DF	(Spain)	Raúl Albentosa	10	10	2	2	12	12
3	DF	(Romania)	Andrei Radu	16	12	1	0	17	12
5	MF	(Romania)	Alexandru Răuță	25	23	4	4	29	27
6	DF	(Romania)	Marco Ehmann	17	15	1	1	18	16
7	DF	(Romania)	Steliano Filip	17	17	4	3	21	20
8	MF	(Romania)	Paul Anton	30	29	5	5	35	34
9	FW	(Nigeria)	Joseph Akpala	1	0	0	0	1	0
10	MF	(Curaçao)	Gevaro Nepomuceno	10	4	3	1	13	5
12	GK	(Romania)	Mihai Eșanu	20	19	3	3	23	22
17	FW	(Slovakia)	Adam Nemec	30	28	4	4	34	32
19	MF	(Romania)	Andrei Blejdea	10	2	2	0	12	2
20	MF	(Romania)	Antonio Bordușanu	2	0	0	0	2	0
21	FW	(Romania)	Giani Stere	4	0	0	0	4	0
22	MF	(Romania)	Deian Sorescu	37	36	5	5	42	41
23	MF	(Romania)	Ionuț Șerban	2	0	0	0	2	0
26	MF	(Sweden)	Jonathan Morsay	13	5	3	2	16	7
27	DF	(Romania)	Ricardo Grigore	20	17	4	4	24	21
28	FW	(Romania)	Valentin Borcea	9	6	0	0	9	6
29	FW	(Romania)	Cătălin Măgureanu	10	5	2	1	12	6
30	MF	(Romania)	Florin Bejan	22	20	3	1	25	21
31	MF	(Italy)	Diego Fabbrini	35	20	4	4	39	24
32	MF	(Romania)	Geani Crețu	14	11	1	0	15	11
38	MF	(Romania)	Andrei Bani	14	6	3	0	17	6
55	MF	(Poland)	Janusz Gol	24	19	3	2	27	21
66	DF	(Croatia)	Ante Puljić	33	30	4	4	37	34
77	MF	(Romania)	Vlad Achim	29	16	4	2	33	18
98	FW	(Romania)	Andreas Mihaiu	17	10	3	1	20	11
99	FW	(Romania)	Robert Moldoveanu	10	2	0	0	10	2
Players transferred out or loaned out during the season
1	GK	(Romania)	Cătălin Straton	3	3	0	0	3	3
1	GK	(Spain)	Tomás Mejías	10	10	0	0	10	10
7	FW	(Spain)	Juan Cámara	12	10	1	1	13	11
9	FW	(Senegal)	Magaye Gueye	18	10	2	2	20	12
10	FW	(Spain)	Borja Valle	9	4	1	0	10	4
18	DF	(Spain)	Isma López	8	8	1	1	9	9
19	FW	(Romania)	Daniel Popa	2	1	0	0	2	1
20	DF	(Romania)	Andrei Sin	2	2	0	0	2	2
21	DF	(Venezuela)	Alexander David González	7	5	0	0	7	5
33	GK	(Spain)	René Román	2	2	1	1	3	3
35	DF	(Senegal)	Abdoulaye Ba	3	2	0	0	3	2
37	FW	(Romania)	Mihai Neicuțescu	2	1	0	0	2	1
75	MF	(Spain)	Aleix García	7	4	1	0	8	4

=== Goalscorers ===
As of match played 19 May 2021

Rank	Pos.	No.	Player	Liga I	Cupa României	Total
1	MF	22	(Romania) Deian Sorescu	7	1	8
2	MF	8	(Romania) Paul Anton	5	2	7
3	FW	10	(Spain) Borja Valle	5	0	5
3	FW	17	(Slovakia) Adam Nemec	4	1	5
5	MF	31	(Italy) Diego Fabbrini	1	2	3
5	FW	9	(Senegal) Magaye Gueye	3	0	3
7	FW	7	(Spain) Juan Cámara	2	0	2
7	DF	30	(Romania) Florin Bejan	1	1	2
7	MF	26	(Sweden) Jonathan Morsay	2	0	2
10	DF	21	(Venezuela) Alexander González	1	0	1
10	DF	66	(Croatia) Ante Puljić	1	0	1
10	DF	7	(Romania) Steliano Filip	1	0	1
10	MF	77	(Romania) Vlad Achim	1	0	1
10	DF	27	(Romania) Ricardo Grigore	1	0	1
10	DF	2	(Spain) Raúl Albentosa	1	0	1
10	DF	3	(Romania) Andrei Radu	0	1	1
10	MF	98	(Romania) Andreas Mihaiu	1	0	1
Total				37	8	45

=== Disciplinary record ===
As of match played 19 May 2021

No.	Pos.	Name	Liga I		Cupa României		Total	
No.	Pos.	Name	Booked	Sent off (straight red)	Booked	Sent off (straight red)	Booked	Sent off (straight red)
1	GK	(Spain) Tomás Mejías	1	0	0	0	1	0
2	DF	(Spain) Raúl Albentosa	1	0	1	0	2	0
3	DF	(Romania) Andrei Radu	4	1	0	0	4	1
5	MF	(Romania) Alexandru Răuță	11	1	2	0	13	1
6	DF	(Romania) Marco Ehmann	7	1	0	0	7	1
7	DF	(Romania) Steliano Filip	7	1	0	0	7	1
7	FW	(Spain) Juan Cámara	4	0	0	0	4	0
8	MF	(Romania) Paul Anton	7	1	2	0	9	1
10	FW	(Spain) Borja Valle	3	0	0	0	3	0
10	MF	(Curaçao) Gevaro Nepomuceno	4	0	1	0	5	0
12	GK	(Romania) Mihai Eșanu	1	0	0	0	1	0
17	FW	(Slovakia) Adam Nemec	7	0	1	0	8	0
18	DF	(Spain) Isma López	0	1	0	0	0	1
19	MF	(Romania) Andrei Blejdea	2	1	0	0	2	1
21	DF	(Venezuela) Alexander David González	2	0	0	0	2	0
22	MF	(Romania) Deian Sorescu	11	0	1	0	12	0
26	MF	(Sweden) Jonathan Morsay	2	0	3	0	5	0
27	DF	(Romania) Ricardo Grigore	4	0	2	0	6	0
30	DF	(Romania) Florin Bejan	6	2	0	0	6	2
31	MF	(Italy) Diego Fabbrini	7	0	1	0	8	0
32	MF	(Romania) Geani Crețu	1	0	0	0	1	0
38	MF	(Romania) Andrei Bani	1	0	0	0	1	0
55	MF	(Poland) Janusz Gol	8	0	0	0	8	0
66	DF	(Croatia) Ante Puljić	6	0	1	0	7	0
77	MF	(Romania) Vlad Achim	3	0	0	0	3	0
98	MF	(Romania) Andreas Mihaiu	3	0	0	0	3	0
99	FW	(Romania) Robert Moldoveanu	1	0	0	0	1	0
Total			114	9	15	0	129	9

== Friendly games ==
27 March 2021	Dynamo Kyiv (Ukraine)	3–0	Dinamo București	Kyiv
17:00 EET (UTC+2)	Clayton 22'; Lyednyev 41'; Khondak 90+1'			Stadium: Valeriy Lobanovskyi; Attendance: None (Behind closed doors)
