= 2018–19 FC Botoșani season =

Botoșani
2018–19 season
- Chairman: vacant
- Manager: Costel Enache
- Stadium: Municipal
- Cupa României: Round of 32
Home colours	Away colours	Third colours

The 2018–19 season will be the xth season of competitive football by Botoșani, and the yth consecutive in Liga I. Botoșani will compete in the Liga I and in Cupa României.

== Previous season positions ==
	Competition	Position
(Romania)	Liga I	8th
(Romania)	Cupa României	Semi-finals

== Competitions ==
Win Draw Loss

=== Liga I ===
The Liga I fixture list was announced on 5 July 2018.

==== Regular season ====
===== Table =====
Pos	Team	Pld	W	D	L	GF	GA	GD	Pts	Qualification
5	Viitorul Constanța	26	11	5	10	26	27	−1	38	Qualification for the Championship round
6	Sepsi OSK	26	10	7	9	32	25	+7	37	Qualification for the Championship round
7	Botoșani	26	9	9	8	31	33	−2	36	Qualification for the Relegation round
8	Politehnica Iași	26	10	4	12	28	38	−10	34	Qualification for the Relegation round
9	Dinamo București	26	8	8	10	29	37	−8	32	Qualification for the Relegation round

Source: LPF (in Romanian), Soccerway
Rules for classification: 1) Points; 2) Head-to-head points; 3) Head-to-head goal difference; 4) Head-to-head goals scored; 5) Goal difference; 6) Goals scored; 7) Play-off.

===== Results summary =====
Overall								Home						Away					
Pld	W	D	L	GF	GA	GD	Pts	W	D	L	GF	GA	GD	W	D	L	GF	GA	GD
26	9	9	8	31	33	−2	36	5	3	5	14	17	−3	4	6	3	17	16	+1

Last updated: 3 March 2019.
Source: Liga I

===== Results by round =====
Round	1	2	3	4	5	6	7	8	9	10	11	12	13	14	15	16	17	18	19	20	21	22	23	24	25	26	27	28	29	30	31	32	33	34	35	36	37	38
Ground	A	H	A	H	A	H	A	A	H	A	H	A	H	H	A	H	A	H	A	H	H	A	H	A	H	A												
Result	D	W	D	D	L	D	D	L	L	D	W	W	L	L	D	W	D	L	W	L	W	W	W	W	D	L												

Updated to match(es) played on 3 March 2019. Source: Liga I
A = Away; H = Home; W = Win; D = Draw; L = Loss

===== Matches =====
Win Draw Loss

20 July 2018 1	CFR Cluj	1–1	FC Botoșani	Cluj-Napoca
21:00 EEST (UTC+3)	Vinícius 26'; D.Djoković (yellow card) 59'	Report	R.Oaidă (yellow card) 19'; M.Roman (yellow card) 45'; Fülöp 48'; Soiledis (yellow card) 52'; M.A.Roman (yellow card) 85'; Patache (yellow card) 86'; J.Rodríguez (yellow card) 87'	Stadium: Dr. Constantin Rădulescu; Attendance: 4,000; Referee: Marcel Bîrsan (Bucharest)

27 July 2018 2	FC Botoșani	2–0	Hermannstadt	Botoșani
21:00 EEST (UTC+3)	A.Dumitraș 44'; M.A.Roman (yellow card) 67' (goal) 77'; R.Oaidă (yellow card) 86'	Report	Dandea (yellow card) 51'; A.Coman (yellow card) 86'; D.Tătar (yellow card) 87'	Stadium: Municipal; Attendance: 3,000; Referee: Ionuţ Coza

3 August 2018 3	Universitatea Craiova	2–2	FC Botoșani	Craiova
21:00 EEST (UTC+3)	A.Burlacu (yellow card) 13'; A.Mitriță 21' (pen.), 35'	Report	Fülöp 11' (yellow card) 45+2'; M.A.Roman (yellow card) 17'; G.Miron 54'; E.Pap (yellow card) 70'	Stadium: Ion Oblemenco; Attendance: 8,500; Referee: Andrei Chivulete

10 August 2018 4	FC Botoșani	1–1	Astra Giurgiu	Botoșani
21:00 EEST (UTC+3)	Ongenda 10'; R.Oaidă (yellow card) 14'; G.Miron (yellow card) 26'; M.Roman (yellow card) 30'; A.Dumitraș (red card) 82'	Report	Mrzljak (yellow card) 17'; Alibec (yellow card) 31'; Bejan 39'	Stadium: Municipal; Attendance: 4,000; Referee: Sebastian Colțescu

17 August 2018 5	Politehnica Iași	2–1	FC Botoșani	Iași
21:00 EEST (UTC+3)	M.Chelaru (yellow card) 28'; A.Cristea 31', 35'; D.Rusu (yellow card) 85'; O.Mihalache (yellow card) 90+2'	Report	Brekalo (yellow card) 54'; M.A.Roman 55'	Stadium: Emil Alexandrescu; Attendance: 4,000; Referee: George Cătălin Găman

27 August 2018 6	FC Botoșani	0–0	Sepsi Sfântu Gheorghe	Botoșani
18:00 EEST (UTC+3)	Soiledis (yellow card) 44'	Report	S.Drăghici (yellow card) 63'; I.Jovanović (yellow card) 65'	Stadium: Municipal; Attendance: 1,500; Referee: Horia Gabriel Mladinovici

2 September 2018 7	FCSB	2–2	FC Botoșani	Voluntari
21:30 EEST (UTC+3)	Man 4' (yellow card) 67'; Gnohéré 21' (pen.); J.Morais (yellow card) 29'; Jakoliš (yellow card) 42'; D.Nedelcu (yellow card) 45+1'; Planić (yellow card) 84'	Report	Chitoșcă (yellow card) 23'; E.Papa 43' (yellow card) 53'; M.A.Roman 75'	Stadium: Anghel Iordănescu; Attendance: 1,500; Referee: Horațiu Feșnic (Cluj)

15 September 2018 8	Dunărea Călărași	3–2	FC Botoșani	Călărași
15:00 EEST (UTC+3)	G.Simion (yellow card) 10'; Pană 21'; Kanda 29'; Dobrosavlevici 37' (yellow card) 49'; Ndiaye 84'; Straton (yellow card) 90+4'	Report	J.Rodríguez 12' (pen.), 51' (pen.); R.Oaidă (yellow card) 18'	Stadium: Ion Comșa; Attendance: 3,000; Referee: Cătălin Popa

22 September 2018 9	FC Botoșani	0–2	Concordia Chiajna	Botoșani
18:00 EEST (UTC+3)	E.Papa (yellow card) 1'; J.Rodríguez (yellow card) 44'; Fabbrini (yellow card) 86'; Golofca (yellow card) 90+2'	Report	A.Marc 32'; G.Matei (yellow card) 43'; Guessan 45'; Gorobsov (yellow card) 57'; Leca (yellow card) 67'; Prepeliță (yellow card) 86'; Greab (yellow card) 90'	Stadium: Municipal; Attendance: 2,000; Referee: Lucian Ruşandu

29 September 2018 10	FC Voluntari	1–1	FC Botoșani	Voluntari
19:15 EEST (UTC+3)	Bucurică (yellow card) 29'; Laïdouni 36' (pen.) (yellow card) 44'; Malfleury (yellow card) 38' (yellow-red card) 51'; Răuță (yellow card) 90+4'	Report	Chindriș (yellow card) 26'; Patache (yellow card) 35'; A.Burcă (yellow card) 62'; Chitoșcă 80'	Stadium: Anghel Iordănescu; Attendance: 300; Referee: Sebastian Colțescu

8 October 2018 11	FC Botoșani	2–0	Dinamo București	Botoșani
21:00 EEST (UTC+3)	R.Oaidă 3'; Chitoșcă (yellow card) 54'; E.Pap (yellow card) 80'; Fabbrini 90+1'	Report	Corbu (yellow card) 20'; Penedo (yellow card) 54'; Nistor (yellow card) 82'	Stadium: Municipal; Attendance: 5,000; Referee: Andrei Chivulete

21 October 2018 12	Gaz Metan Mediaș	1–2	FC Botoșani	Mediaș
18:00 EEST (UTC+3)	Yazalde 15'; V.Crețu (yellow card) 23'	Report	A.Dumitraș (yellow card) 69'; M.A.Roman 73'; J.Rodríguez 89' (pen.) (yellow card) 90+2'	Stadium: Gaz Metan; Attendance: 1,500; Referee: István Kovács (Carei)

27 October 2018 13	FC Botoșani	1–2	Viitorul Constanța	Botoșani
18:00 EEST (UTC+3)	J.Rodríguez (yellow card) 73'; Trujić 90+4'	Report	I.Vînă (yellow card) 60'; Voduț 67'; I.Hagi 86' (pen.)	Stadium: Municipal; Attendance: 3,500; Referee: Marius Avram

3 November 2018 14	FC Botoșani	1–5	CFR Cluj	Botoșani
21:00 EET (UTC+2)	Ongenda 83'	Report	Chitoșcă 10' (o.g.); Culio 28'; A.Păun 54'; C.Deac 69'; Omrani 73'	Stadium: Municipal; Attendance: 2,500; Referee: Alexandru Tudor (Bucharest)

12 November 2018 15	Hermannstadt	1–1	FC Botoșani	Târgu Mureș
14:00 EET (UTC+2)	Serediuc (yellow card) 38'; Mijušković (yellow card) 65'; D.Tătar 77'; Dandea (yellow card) 81'; Tsoumou (yellow card) 90+3'	Report	J.Rodríguez 63' (pen.) (yellow card) 75'; M.A.Roman (yellow card) 67'	Stadium: Trans-Sil; Attendance: 200; Referee: Andrei Chivulete

26 November 2018 16	FC Botoșani	2–1	Universitatea Craiova	Botoșani
20:30 EET (UTC+2)	Fabbrini 25'; Fülöp 35'; Patache (yellow card) 54'; Golofca (yellow card) 65'	Report	V.Mihăilă (yellow card) 18'; R.Dimitrov (yellow card) 34'; C.Bărbuț (yellow card) 39'; Kelić (yellow card) 46'; Bancu (yellow card) 68'; Mateiu 79'	Stadium: Municipal; Attendance: 1,000; Referee: István Kovács (Carei)

3 December 2018 17	Astra Giurgiu	1–1	FC Botoșani	Giurgiu
20:00 EET (UTC+2)	Bejan (yellow card) 61'; Belu-Iordache (yellow card) 71' (goal) 74'; Cestor (yellow card) 78'; Mrzljak (yellow card) 88'	Report	Fülöp (yellow card) 50'; A.Burcă 55'; Ongenda (yellow card) 84'	Stadium: Marin Anastasovici; Attendance: 300; Referee: Sebastian Colțescu

6 December 2018 18	FC Botoșani	1–2	Politehnica Iași	Botoșani
17:00 EET (UTC+2)	G.Miron 6'	Report	A.Sin (yellow card) 22'; Platini 34'; D.Flores 45+2' (yellow card) 90'; A.Cristea (yellow card) 51'; P.Petre (yellow card) 67'; D.Rusu (yellow card) 90+6'	Stadium: Municipal; Attendance: 2,000; Referee: Marian Alexandru Barbu

10 December 2018 19	Sepsi Sfântu Gheorghe	0–1	FC Botoșani	Sfântu Gheorghe
17:30 EET (UTC+2)	Tandia (yellow card) 66'; Nouvier (yellow card) 79'	Report	Golofca 33'; Fülöp (yellow card) 54'; Fraisl (yellow card) 70'; G.Miron (yellow card) 74'; Soiledis (yellow card) 90+2'	Stadium: Municipal; Attendance: 2,000; Referee: Adrian Viorel Cojocaru

16 December 2018 20	FC Botoșani	1–3	FCSB	Botoșani
20:00 EET (UTC+2)	Golofca 24'; Fabbrini (yellow card) 28'; G.Miron (yellow card) 40'	Report	Gnohéré 14'; J.Morais (yellow card) 34'; L.Filip 38'; F.Coman (yellow card) 52'; A.Stan (yellow card) 60'; Man (yellow card) 85'; Rusescu 86'	Stadium: Municipal; Attendance: 4,000; Referee: Marcel Bîrsan (Bucharest)

20 December 2018 21	FC Botoșani	1–0	Dunărea Călărași	Botoșani
17:30 EET (UTC+2)	Ongenda 36'; Patache (yellow card) 68'	Report	G.Mendy (yellow card) 65'	Stadium: Municipal; Attendance: 300; Referee: Iulian Călin

1 February 2019 22	Concordia Chiajna	0–1	Botoșani	Chiajna
17:00 EET (UTC+2)	Măzărache (yellow card) 29'; Bărboianu (yellow card) 33'; Tha'er Bawab (yellow card) 36'; Ropotan (yellow card) 63'; Radu (yellow card) 76'; Guessan (yellow card) 78'	Summary	Rodríguez (yellow card) 52'; Fabbrini 72'; Târșă (yellow card) 73'; Miron (yellow card) 77'	Stadium: Concordia; Attendance: 300; Referee: George Cătălin Găman

11 February 2019 23	Botoșani	1–0	Voluntari	Botoșani
17:00 EET (UTC+2)	Roman 45' (yellow card) 57'; Ongenda (yellow card) 54'; Dumitraș (yellow card) 59'; Soiledis (yellow card) 90+3'; Pap (yellow card) 90+6'	Summary	Laïdouni (yellow card) 56'; Tudorie (yellow card) 90+3'; Petrariu (yellow card) 90+3'	Stadium: Municipal; Attendance: 1,500; Referee: George Rădulescu

17 February 2019 24	Dinamo București	1–2	Botoșani	Bucharest
20:00 EET (UTC+2)	Montini 24'; Aït-Atmane (yellow card) 31'; Grigore (yellow card) 33'; Filip (yellow card) 45'; Aliji (yellow card) 54'; Popa (yellow card) 70'	Summary	Golofca 28'; Fabbrini 75'; Burcă (yellow card) 81'; Rodríguez (yellow card) 90+2'; Fraisl (yellow card) 90+4'	Stadium: Dinamo; Attendance: 5,728; Referee: Ovidiu Hațegan

24 February 2019 25	Botoșani	1–1	Gaz Metan Mediaș	Botoșani
17:00 EET (UTC+2)	Fülöp 42' (yellow card) 43'; Golofca (yellow card) 43'; Soiledis (yellow card) 60'; Dumitraș (yellow card) 62'; Roman (yellow card) 79'; Burcă (yellow card) 86'	Summary	Cristea 37' (yellow card) 61'; Olaru (yellow card) 52'; Fofana (yellow card) 82'; Chamed (yellow card) 90+1'; Diallo (yellow card) 90+3'	Stadium: Municipal; Attendance: 2,000; Referee: Constantin Sebastian Colțescu

3 March 2019 26	Viitorul Constanța	1–0	Botoșani	Ovidiu
17:00 EET (UTC+2)	Hagi (yellow card) 18'; Houri 26'; Băluță (yellow card) 36'; Boboc (yellow card) 88'	Summary	Ongenda (yellow card) 8'; Oaidă (yellow card) 28'; Rodríguez (yellow card) 44'; Miron (yellow card) 51'; Roman (yellow card) 82'; Fabbrini (yellow card) 84'; Târșă (yellow card) 89'	Stadium: Viitorul; Attendance: 4,500; Referee: Ovidiu Hațegan

==== Relegation round ====
===== Table =====
Pos	Team	Pld	W	D	L	GF	GA	GD	Pts	Qualification or relegation
7	Gaz Metan Mediaș	14	10	2	2	25	9	+16	48	
8	Botoșani	14	8	2	4	18	9	+9	44	
9	Dinamo București	14	8	3	3	16	7	+9	43	
10	Politehnica Iași	14	3	5	6	12	18	−6	31	
11	Voluntari	14	5	5	4	14	16	−2	31	
12	Hermannstadt (O)	14	2	5	7	9	19	−10	27	Qualification for the relegation play-offs
13	Dunărea Călărași (R)	14	3	4	7	8	18	−10	25	Relegation to Liga II
14	Concordia Chiajna (R)	14	2	4	8	17	23	−6	19	Relegation to Liga II

Source: Soccerway
Rules for classification: 1) Points; 2) Points without rounding; 3) Head-to-head points; 4) Head-to-head goal difference; 5) Head-to-head goals scored; 6) Goal difference; 7) Goals scored; 8) Play-off (only if needed to decide teams for relegation). (Note: only criteria 6 and 7 are applied to establish the classification during the competition.)
(O) Play-off winners; (R) Relegated

===== Results summary =====
Overall								Home						Away					
Pld	W	D	L	GF	GA	GD	Pts	W	D	L	GF	GA	GD	W	D	L	GF	GA	GD
14	8	2	4	18	9	+9	26	5	1	1	9	2	+7	3	1	3	9	7	+2

Last updated: 31 May 2019.
Source: Liga I

===== Position by round =====
Round	1	2	3	4	5	6	7	8	9	10	11	12	13	14
Ground	H	A	H	A	H	A	H	A	H	A	H	A	H	A
Result	D	L	L	L	W	L	W	D	W	W	W	W	W	W
Position	9	10	11	11	10	11	9	9	9	9	9	9	8	8

Updated to match(es) played on 31 May 2019. Source: Liga I
A = Away; H = Home; W = Win; D = Draw; L = Loss

===== Matches =====
Win Draw Loss

11 March 2019 1	Botoșani	0–0	Concordia Chiajna	Botoșani
17:30 EEST	Fabbrini (yellow card) 39'; Golofca (yellow card) 84'; Dumitraș (yellow card) 88'	Summary	Gorobsov (yellow card) 33'; Grădinaru (yellow card) 39'; Fota (yellow card) 52'; Albu (yellow card) 67'; Marc (yellow card) 75'; Rîmniceanu (yellow card) 79'; Cadamuro (yellow card) 90+1'	Stadium: Municipal; Attendance: 1,200; Referee: Sorin Andrei Antonie

18 March 2019 2	Voluntari	2–1	Botoșani	Voluntari
20:30 EEST	Signorelli (yellow card) 13'; Laïdouni 31'; Armaș (yellow card) 67'; Hodorogea (yellow card) 71'; Căpățînă (yellow card) 79'; Tudorie 89' (yellow card) 90+3'	Summary	Fülöp 64'; Burcă (yellow card) 67'; Miron (yellow card) 72'; Golofca (yellow card) 77'; Karaboué (yellow card) 90+3'	Stadium: Anghel Iordănescu; Attendance: 450; Referee: Iulian Călin

1 April 2019 3	Botoșani	1–2	Dunărea Călărași	Botoșani
17:30 EEST	Buș 7'; Fülöp (yellow card) 45'; Roman (yellow card) 80'; Fabbrini (yellow card) 90+2'; Ongenda (yellow card) 90+6'; Pap (yellow card) 90+6'	Summary	Iancu 33'; Souda (yellow card) 42'; Mendy (yellow card) 49'; Ammari 57'; Dobrosavlevici (yellow card) 65' (yellow-red card) 87'; Luchin (yellow card) 90+2'; Ndiaye (yellow card) 90+4'; Keyta (yellow card) 90+6'	Stadium: Municipal; Attendance: 1,500; Referee: Adrian Viorel Cojocaru

7 April 2019 4	Gaz Metan Mediaș	2–0	Botoșani	Mediaș
17:30 EEST	Larie 12'; Constantin (yellow card) 25'; Chamed (yellow card) 50'; Luís Aurélio (yellow card) 73'; Bușu (yellow card) 77'; Olaru 90+3'	Summary	Papa (yellow card) 60'; Miron (yellow card) 85'	Stadium: Gaz Metan; Attendance: 1,500; Referee: Marcel Bîrsan

13 April 2019 5	Botoșani	1–0	Hermannstadt	Botoșani
18:30 EEST	Roman (yellow card) 90'; Fabbrini 90+3'	Summary	Dandea (yellow card) 7'; Stoica (yellow card) 39'; Dâlbea (yellow card) 65'; Tătar (yellow card) 68'	Stadium: Municipal; Attendance: 2,000; Referee: Sebastian Colțescu

22 April 2019 6	Dinamo București	1–0	Botoșani	Bucharest
21:00 EEST	Sorescu (yellow card) 9'; N'Diaye (yellow card) 36' (goal) 88'; Papazoglou (yellow card) 37'	Summary	Miron (yellow card) 23'; Papa (yellow card) 86'; Fraisl (yellow card) 88'	Stadium: Dinamo; Attendance: 1,280; Referee: Iulian Dima

28 April 2019 7	Botoșani	3–0	Politehnica Iași	Botoșani
18:00 EEST	Fülöp 31' (pen.) 45'; Patache (yellow card) 35'; Rodríguez (yellow card) 53'; Holzmann (red card) 80'; Karaboué (yellow card) 86'; Golofca 90+4'	Summary	Gardoș (yellow card) 29'; Platini (yellow card) 30'; Semedo (yellow card) 46'; Mihăescu (yellow card) 57'; Rus (yellow card) 80'; Panțîru (yellow card) 90+2'	Stadium: Municipal; Attendance: 3,000; Referee: Horaiu Fesnic

3 May 2019 8	Concordia Chiajna	2–2	Botoșani	Chiajna
18:00 EEST	Moussa 9'; João Meira (yellow card) 23'; Ropotan (yellow card) 27'; Cadamuro 69'	Summary	Pițian (yellow card) 61'; João Meira 64' (o.g.); Roman 71'	Stadium: Concordia; Attendance: 150; Referee: Ovidiu Hațegan

10 May 2019 9	Botoșani	2–0	Voluntari	Botoșani
18:00 EEST	Papa (yellow card) 2'; Roman 9' (yellow card) 70'; Golofca 45+2'; Rodríguez (yellow card) 57'	Summary	Popadiuc (yellow card) 22' (yellow-red card) 34'; Russo (yellow card) 31'; Căpățînă (yellow card) 64'	Stadium: Municipal; Referee: Marius Avram

14 May 2019 10	Dunărea Călărași	0–2	Botoșani	Călărași
18:15 EEST	Iancu (yellow card) 33'; Luchin (yellow card) 45'; Ammari (yellow card) 84'	Report	Fülöp 29' (pen.) (yellow card) 79'; Golofca 45'; Roman (yellow card) 69'; Buș (yellow card) 86'; Fraisl (yellow card) 89'; Burcă (yellow card) 90+3'	Stadium: Ion Comșa; Attendance: 1,000; Referee: Istvan Kovacs

17 May 2019 11	Botoșani	1–0	Gaz Metan Mediaș	Botoșani
20:00 EEST	Rodríguez 44' (pen.); Pițian (yellow card) 69'; Golofca (yellow card) 73'; Patache (yellow card) 78'; Miron (yellow card) 86'	Report	Constantin (red card) 66'	Stadium: Municipal; Attendance: 2,000; Referee: Horia Mladinovici

21 May 2019 12	Hermannstadt	0–2	Botoșani	Sibiu
18:30 EEST	Tsoumou (yellow card) 23'	Report	Rodríguez (yellow card) 69'; Oaidă (yellow card) 80' (yellow-red card) 81'; Roman 85'; Golofca 90+3'	Stadium: Municipal; Attendance: 4,500; Referee: George Găman

27 May 2019 13	Botoșani	1–0	Dinamo București	Botoșani
21:00 EEST	Roman 8'; Golofca (yellow card) 57'	Report	Grigore (yellow card) 41'; Zenke (yellow card) 50'	Stadium: Municipal; Attendance: 3,000; Referee: Ionu Coza

31 May 2019 14	Politehnica Iași	0–2	Botoșani	Iași
18:30 EEST	Rus (yellow card) 54'; Pipoș (yellow card) 78'	Report	Holzmann (yellow card) 35' (goal) 68'; Papa (yellow card) 36'; Piftor (yellow card) 45+1'; Burcă 48' (yellow card) 87'	Stadium: Emil Alexandrescu; Attendance: 200; Referee: Eduard Ioniţă

=== Cupa României ===
Botoșani will enter the Cupa României at the Round of 32.

25 September 2018 Round of 32	Voluntari	2–1	Botoșani	Voluntari
16:00	Zgrablić (yellow card) 34'; Belahmeur 38'; Tudorie 41'; Laïdouni (yellow card) 42'; Răuță (yellow card) 48'; Vlad (yellow card) 58'	Summary	Karaboué (yellow card) 10'; Oaidă (yellow card) 23'; Miron (yellow card) 33' (yellow-red card) 54'; Piftor (yellow card) 45+2' (yellow-red card) 52'; Chitoșcă 46'; Chindriș (yellow card) 72'	Stadium: Stadionul Anghel Iordănescu; Attendance: 100; Referee: Sorin Andrei Antonie

== See also ==
- 2018–19 Cupa României
- 2018–19 Liga I
