= 2019–20 FC Dinamo București season =

Dinamo București
2019–20 season
- General Manager: Florin Prunea (until 15 June)
- Head Coach: Eugen Neagoe (until 12 August); Dušan Uhrin Jr. (13 August-9 March); Adrian Mihalcea (11 March-14 July); Gheorghe Mulțescu (from 14 July)
- Stadium: Dinamo, Arena Națională
- Liga I: 13th
- Cupa României: Semifinals
- Top goalscorer: League: Sorescu 10; All: Sorescu 11
- Highest home attendance: 27,668 (vs. FCSB)
- Lowest home attendance: Pre-spectatorless matches: (Note: All matches played after 8 March 2020 have been, or are scheduled to be, played behind closed doors without any spectators.); 620 (vs. Clinceni)
- Average home league attendance: 4,624 (Note: The average league attendance after 14 matches, prior to fixtures being played behind closed doors.)
Home colours	Away colours	Third colours

The 2019–20 season was the 71st season in Dinamo București's history, all of them played in the top-flight of Romanian football. Dinamo competed in Liga I and in the Cupa României.

== Facts and events ==
On 3 June 2019, head coach Mircea Rednic was sacked due to poor results. On the same day, the club announced the new coach, Eugen Neagoe.

Also before the start of the season, Florin Prunea was named general manager of the club.

During the match against Universitatea Craiova, head coach Eugen Neagoe suffered a heart attack. He was rushed to the ambulance and resuscitated, then he was taken to Floreasca Hospital where he was stabilised.

Neagoe was advised by doctors to take a break in the coming period and the assistant coach Sebastian Moga led the team against CFR Cluj. Then, for the matches against Academica Clinceni and Poli Iași, Moga was assisted by Iulian Mihăescu.

On 12 August, Dinamo announced the separation from Neagoe. The next day, the Czech manager Dušan Uhrin Jr. was installed as head coach. Seven months later, Dinamo and Uhrin reached an agreement to end mutually the contract. In 23 games in Liga I with Uhrin in charge, Dinamo won nine and lost ten.

On 11 March, Adrian Mihalcea was appointed as the new head coach of Dinamo.

Dinamo's return after a three-month suspension due to coronavirus was postponed. The first two games that Dinamo should have played at the restart were rescheduled when Dinamo's kitman tested positive for the coronavirus and the entire team was quarantined.

Mihalcea began his tenure with four losses in the first four games in charge and Dinamo reached bottom in the championship. On 5 July, Dinamo won against Academica Clinceni and hauled themselves off the bottom position but stayed in the relegation zone. The next game ended in a draw, at home, against Politehnica Iași. Thus, Mihalcea was sacked, after only seven games in charge. Gheorghe Mulțescu came back as Dinamo's head coach, for the fourth time.

Dinamo was again affected by coronavirus. Six players tested positive on 16 July and the entire team was again quarantined for five days, until the next set of tests. Other four players tested positive the next two days. On 22 July, the number of infected players rose to 18.

On 6 August, the Liga I season was frozen and Dinamo didn't play all its postponed games, finishing the season on the 13th place. But Dinamo was spared from relegation after the Romanian Federation decided to increase the number of teams in Liga I from 14 to 16. Thus, only the 14th place played a relegation/promotion play-off against the third place in Liga II.

== Previous season positions ==
	Competition	Position
(Romania)	Liga I	9th
(Romania)	Cupa României	Round of 16

== Transfers ==
=== In ===
Date	Pos.	Player	Age	Moving from	Fee	Source
6 June	GK	Cătălin Straton	9 October 1989 (aged 29)	FC Dunărea Călărași	Free	
7 June	MF	Alexandru Răuță	17 June 1992 (aged 26)	FC Voluntari	Free	
18 June	DF	Andrei Sin	26 October 1991 (aged 27)	Politehnica Iași	Free	
19 June	DF	Florin Bejan	28 March 1991 (aged 28)	Astra Giurgiu	Free	
25 June	DF	Gabriel de Moura (Brazil)	18 June 1988 (aged 31)	Sepsi Sfântu Gheorghe	Free	
25 June	FW	Slavko Perović (Serbia)	9 June 1989 (aged 30)	İstanbulspor (Turkey)	Free	
27 June	MF	Kévin Bru (Mauritius)	12 December 1988 (aged 30)	Apollon Limassol (Cyprus)	Free	
28 June	GK	Riccardo Piscitelli (Italy)	10 October 1993 (aged 25)	Carpi (Italy)	Free	
30 June	FW	Brito (Cape Verde)	16 October 1987 (aged 31)	Xanthi (Greece)	Free	
1 July	MF	Filip Mrzljak (Croatia)	16 April 1993 (aged 26)	Astra Giurgiu	Free	
22 August	MF	Diego Fabbrini (Italy)	31 July 1990 (aged 29)	CSKA Sofia (Bulgaria)	Free	
30 August	MF	Roberto Strechie	16 July 2000 (aged 19)	Venezia (Italy)	Free	
5 September	DF	Ante Puljić (Croatia)	5 November 1987 (aged 31)	Al-Faisaly (Saudi Arabia)	Free	
8 September	DF	Ekrem Oltay	3 April 2000 (aged 19)	Dunărea Călărași	Loan return	
12 January	DF	Lukáš Skovajsa (Slovakia)	27 March 1994 (aged 25)	Trenčín (Slovakia)	Free	
16 January	MF	Valentin Lazăr	21 August 1989 (aged 30)	Ümraniyespor (Turkey)	Free	
28 January	DF	Kristián Koštrna (Slovakia)	15 December 1993 (aged 26)	DAC Dunajská Streda (Slovakia)	Free	

=== Loans in ===
Date	Pos.	Player	Age	Moving from	Fee	Notes	Source
29 January	DF	Szabolcs Kilyén	19 March 1998 (aged 21)	Viitorul Constanța	Free	Until 30 June	

=== Out ===
Date	Pos.	Player	Age	Moving to	Fee	Source
30 June	DF	Damien Dussaut (France)	8 November 1994 (aged 24)	Viitorul Constanța	Free	
30 June	DF	Facundo Mallo (Uruguay)	16 January 1995 (aged 24)	Rapid București	Free	
30 June	MF	Elvis Kabashi (Albania)	20 February 1994 (aged 25)	Renate (Italy)	Free	
30 June	FW	Alexander Christovão (Angola)	14 March 1993 (aged 26)	Al-Mujazzal (Saudi Arabia)	Free	
30 June	FW	Simon Zenke (Nigeria)	24 December 1988 (aged 30)	Schiltigheim (France)	Free	
30 June	DF	Rachid Aït-Atmane (Algeria)	4 February 1993 (aged 26)	CS Sfaxien (Tunisia)	Free	
30 June	DF	Naser Aliji (Albania)	27 December 1993 (aged 25)	Budapest Honvéd (Hungary)	Free	
30 June	GK	Parfait Mandanda (Democratic Republic of the Congo)	10 October 1989 (aged 29)	Charleroi (Belgium)	End of loan	
10 July	FW	Athanasios Papazoglou (Greece)	30 March 1988 (aged 31)	Voluntari	Free	
12 July	GK	Vlad Muțiu	2 February 1995 (aged 24)	Farul Constanța	Free	
5 August	MF	Reda Jaadi (Belgium)	14 February 1995 (aged 24)	FUS Rabat (Morocco)	Free	
9 August	MF	Nabil Jaadi (Belgium)	1 July 1996 (aged 23)	FUS Rabat (Morocco)	Free	
9 August	MF	Aleksandru Longher	8 June 2000 (aged 19)	FC Botoșani	Free	
1 November	MF	Kévin Bru (Mauritius)	12 December 1988 (aged 30)	Créteil (France)	Free	
6 January	MF	Dan Nistor	6 May 1988 (aged 31)	Universitatea Craiova	260,000 Euro	
10 January	MF	Roberto Strechie	16 July 2000 (aged 19)	Novara (Italy)	Free	
10 January	DF	Linas Klimavičius (Lithuania)	10 April 1989 (aged 30)	FC Politehnica Iași	Free	
17 January	DF	Denis Ciobotariu	10 June 1998 (aged 21)	CFR Cluj	150,000 Euro	
20 January	MF	Ivan Pešić (Croatia)	6 April 1992 (aged 27)	Kaisar (Kazakhstan)	Free	
25 January	DF	Gabriel de Moura (Brazil)	18 June 1988 (aged 31)	Gaz Metan Mediaș	Free	
30 January	FW	Brito (Cape Verde)	16 November 1987 (aged 32)	Académica (Portugal)	Free	
10 February	DF	Laurențiu Corbu	10 May 1994 (aged 25)	Chindia Târgoviște	Free	
30 June	MF	Ioan Filip	20 May 1989 (aged 31)	Universitatea Cluj	Released	
16 July	GK	Riccardo Piscitelli (Italy)	10 October 1993 (aged 26)	C.D. Nacional (Portugal)	Released	

=== Loans out ===
Date	Pos.	Player	Age	Moving to	Fee	Source
23 June	DF	Alin Dudea	6 June 1997 (aged 22)	Chindia Târgoviște	Free	
23 June; Recalled on 7 August	FW	Mihai Neicuțescu	29 September 1998 (aged 20)	Chindia Târgoviște	Free	
4 July; Recalled on 7 February	DF	Marco Ehmann	3 August 2000 (aged 18)	CSM Reșița	Free	
9 July	DF	Ekrem Oltay	3 April 2000 (aged 19)	Dunărea Călărași	Free	
18 July	DF	Vlad Olteanu	21 March 1996 (aged 23)	Concordia Chiajna	Free	
19 July; Recalled on 3 September	MF	Cătălin Măgureanu	5 June 2000 (aged 19)	Dunărea Călărași	Free	
31 July; Returned on 23 October	FW	Gabriel Răducan	7 November 2000 (aged 18)	Daco-Getica București	Free	
31 July; Returned on 23 October	DF	Radu Zamfir	2 July 2001 (aged 18)	Daco-Getica București	Free	
31 July; Returned on 23 October	MF	Liviu Gheorghe	2 August 1999 (aged 19)	Daco-Getica București	Free	
31 August	MF	Geani Crețu	12 January 2000 (aged 19)	Rapid București	Free	
3 September	MF	Alin Lazăr	30 September 2000 (aged 18)	CSM Reșița	Free	
3 September	MF	Cătălin Măgureanu	5 June 2000 (aged 19)	Afumați	Free	
7 November	FW	Gabriel Răducan	7 November 2000 (aged 19)	CSM Reșița	Free	
30 January	GK	Mihai Eșanu	25 July 1998 (aged 21)	Farul Constanța	Free	
4 February	DF	Florin Bejan	28 March 1991 (aged 28)	Academica Clinceni	Free	
4 February	GK	Dragoș Petrișor	3 January 2000 (aged 20)	Turris Turnu Măgurele	Free	
9 February	DF	Alin Dudea	6 June 1997 (aged 22)	CSM Reșița	Free	

== Friendlies ==
Win Draw Loss

26 June 2019 Friendly	Dinamo București	2–0	(Northern Ireland) Linfield	Marbella, Spain
20:00 EEST (UTC+3)	Montini 16'; Popa 75'	Report		Stadium: Marbella Football Center

30 June 2019 Friendly	Dinamo București	6–1	(Gibraltar) FCB Magpies	Estepona, Spain
20:00 EEST (UTC+3)	Montini 20'; Sorescu 45'; Mihaiu 54'; Perović 75', 77'; Popa 86'	Report	69' Gomez

3 July 2019 Friendly	Dinamo București	3–0	(Scotland) Kilmarnock	Marbella, Spain
20:00 EEST (UTC+3)	Bejan 11'; Nistor 67'; Mihaiu 88'	Report		Stadium: Marbella Football Center

10 July 2019 Friendly	Dinamo București	2–2	(Romania) Chindia Târgoviște	Săftica, Romania
10:30 EEST (UTC+3)	Nistor 9' (pen.); Montini 70'	Report	40' Leca; 65' Mitrović	Stadium: Baza Sportivă Săftica

15 January 2020 Friendly	Dinamo București	0–1	(Germany) Dynamo Dresden	Marbella, Spain
16:30 EET (UTC+2)		Report	23' (pen.) Ebert	Stadium: La Cala

18 January 2020 Friendly	Dinamo București	1–1	(Germany) VfL Bochum	La Línea de la Concepción, Spain
17:00 EET (UTC+2)	Sorescu 27'	Report	65' Weilandt	Stadium: Estadio Municipal de La Línea de la Concepción

20 January 2020 Friendly	Dinamo București	1–1	(Croatia) NK Osijek	Estepona, Spain
16:30 EET (UTC+2)	Perović 15'	Report	80' Drena Beljo	Stadium: Complejo Deportivo Arroyo Enmedio

22 January 2020 Friendly	Dinamo București	1–2	(Russia) FC Krasnodar	Estepona, Spain
17:00 EET (UTC+2)	Mrzljak 37'	Report	57' Sergeyev; 65' Ari	Stadium: Complejo Deportivo Arroyo Enmedio

4 June 2020 Friendly	Dinamo București	1–0	(Romania) Rapid București	Săftica, Romania
11:00 EEST (UTC+3)	Perović 59'	Report		Stadium: Baza Sportivă Săftica

== Competitions ==
Win Draw Loss

=== Overview ===
Competition	First match	Last match	Starting round	Final position	Record							
Competition	First match	Last match	Starting round	Final position	Pld	W	D	L	GF	GA	GD	Win %
Liga I	15 July 2019	5 August 2020	Matchday 1	13th	34	12	5	17	44	51	−7	35.29
Cupa României	24 September 2019	8 July 2020	Round of 32	Semi-finals	5	3	0	2	8	5	+3	60.00
Total					39	15	5	19	52	56	−4	38.46

Last updated: 5 August 2020
Source: Competitions

=== Liga I ===
The Liga I fixture list was announced in July 2019.

==== Regular season ====
===== Table =====
Pos	Team	Pld	W	D	L	GF	GA	GD	Pts	Qualification
6	Astra Giurgiu (Note: Astra Giurgiu were deducted 3 points due to financial reasons.)	26	13	6	7	38	29	+9	42	Qualification for the Championship round
7	Viitorul Constanța	26	11	7	8	44	29	+15	40	Qualification for the Relegation round
8	Dinamo București	26	10	4	12	37	41	−4	34	Qualification for the Relegation round
9	Sepsi OSK	26	7	12	7	30	26	+4	33	Qualification for the Relegation round
10	Hermannstadt	26	5	10	11	26	44	−18	25	Qualification for the Relegation round

Source: LPF (in Romanian), Soccerway
Rules for classification: 1) Points; 2) Head-to-head points; 3) Head-to-head goal difference; 4) Head-to-head goals scored; 5) Goal difference; 6) Goals scored; 7) Play-off.

===== Results summary =====
Overall								Home						Away					
Pld	W	D	L	GF	GA	GD	Pts	W	D	L	GF	GA	GD	W	D	L	GF	GA	GD
26	10	4	12	37	41	−4	34	9	2	2	25	12	+13	1	2	10	12	29	−17

Last updated: 23 February 2020.
Source: Liga I

===== Results by round =====
Round	1	2	3	4	5	6	7	8	9	10	11	12	13	14	15	16	17	18	19	20	21	22	23	24	25	26
Ground	A	H	A	H	A	A	H	A	H	A	H	A	H	H	A	H	A	H	H	A	H	A	H	A	H	A
Result	L	L	L	W	L	L	W	W	D	L	W	D	W	W	L	D	D	W	W	L	L	L	W	L	W	L
Position	14	14	14	10	12	14	9	9	9	10	10	10	9	8	9	9	9	8	7	8	8	9	8	9	8	8

Updated to match(es) played on 23 February 2020. Source: Liga I
A = Away; H = Home; W = Win; D = Draw; L = Loss

===== Matches =====
Win Draw Loss

15 July 2019 1	Viitorul Constanța	5–0	Dinamo București	Ovidiu
21:00 EEST (UTC+3)	Iancu 9', 69'; Ganea 48'; Calcan 66'; Eric 70'			Stadium: Viitorul; Attendance: 4,500; Referee: Marcel Bîrsan (Bucharest)

21 July 2019 2	Dinamo București	0–2	Universitatea Craiova	Bucharest
21:00 EEST (UTC+3)			48' Bărbuț; 49' Roman	Stadium: Arena Națională; Attendance: 7,343; Referee: István Kovács (Carei)

27 July 2019 3	CFR Cluj	1–0	Dinamo București	Cluj-Napoca
21:00 EEST (UTC+3)	Omrani 83' (pen.)			Stadium: Dr. Constantin Rădulescu; Attendance: 5,000; Referee: Andrei Chivulete (București)

2 August 2019 4	Dinamo București	4–2	Academica Clinceni	Bucharest
21:00 EEST (UTC+3)	Popa 52', 82', 90+3'; Montini 56'		65' Vojtuš; 73' Ion	Stadium: Dinamo; Attendance: 1,515; Referee: Adrian Cojocaru (Galați)

9 August 2019 5	Politehnica Iași	2–0	Dinamo București	Iași
21:00 EEST (UTC+3)	Breeveld 23'; Horșia 31'			Stadium: Emil Alexandrescu; Attendance: 7,000; Referee: Sebastian Colțescu (Craiova)

16 August 2019 6	Chindia Târgoviște	3–2	Dinamo București	Ploiești
19:30 EEST (UTC+3)	Neguț 19'; Leca 45+3'; Cherchez 65' (pen.)		Montini 54'; Nistor 82'	Stadium: Ilie Oană; Attendance: 5,500; Referee: Iulian Călin (Ștefănești, Argeș)

26 August 2019 7	Dinamo București	3–0	Hermannstadt	Bucharest
21:00 EEST (UTC+3)	Ciobotariu 19'; Nistor 65' (pen.); Klimavičius 75'			Stadium: Dinamo; Attendance: 1,902; Referee: István Kovács (Carei)

2 September 2019 8	Sepsi Sfântu Gheorghe	0–1	Dinamo București	Sfântu Gheorghe
21:00 EEST (UTC+3)			Popa 83'	Stadium: Municipal; Attendance: 4,400; Referee: Ovidiu Hațegan (Arad)

14 September 2019 9	Dinamo București	1–1	Botoșani	Bucharest
21:00 EEST (UTC+3)	Sorescu 57'		65' Moussa	Stadium: Arena Națională; Attendance: 8,130; Referee: George Rădulescu (Bucharest)

21 September 2019 10	Astra Giurgiu	3–2	Dinamo București	Giurgiu
20:30 EEST (UTC+3)	Budescu 49', 66'; Crepulja 80'		16' Popescu; 74' Moldoveanu	Stadium: Marin Anastasovici; Attendance: 1,137; Referee: Cătălin Popa (Pitești)

27 September 2019 11	Dinamo București	2–1	Voluntari	Bucharest
20:30 EEST (UTC+3)	Montini 51'; Puljić 78'		75' Balaur	Stadium: Dinamo; Attendance: 1,654; Referee: Sebastian Colțescu (Craiova)

5 October 2019 12	FCSB	1–1	Dinamo București	Bucharest
20:30 EEST (UTC+3)	Coman 28'		10' Ciobotariu	Stadium: Arena Națională; Attendance: 30,235; Referee: István Kovács (Carei)

18 October 2019 13	Dinamo București	2–0	Gaz Metan Mediaș	Bucharest
20:30 EEST (UTC+3)	Mrzljak 21'; Sorescu 73'			Stadium: Dinamo; Attendance: 1,804; Referee: Ovidiu Hațegan (Arad)

27 October 2019 14	Dinamo București	3–2	Viitorul Constanța	Bucharest
20:30 EET (UTC+2)	Perović 29'; Sorescu 30'; Filip 61'		76' Iancu; 79' Boboc	Stadium: Dinamo; Attendance: 3,601; Referee: Radu Petrescu (Bucharest)

4 November 2019 15	Universitatea Craiova	4–1	Dinamo București	Drobeta-Turnu Severin
20:30 EET (UTC+2)	Ivanov 20'; Ivan 31', 45+1'; Mihăilă 86'		57' Nistor	Stadium: Municipal; Attendance: 12,342; Referee: Marius Avram (Bucharest)

10 November 2019 16	Dinamo București	0–0	CFR Cluj	Bucharest
19:00 EET (UTC+2)				Stadium: Dinamo; Attendance: 4,311; Referee: Ovidiu Hațegan (Arad)

24 November 2019 17	Academica Clinceni	2–2	Dinamo București	Clinceni
13:30 EET (UTC+2)	Cebotaru 11' (pen.); Merloi 22'		32' Sorescu; 45+2' Perović	Stadium: Clinceni; Attendance: 2,000; Referee: Andrei Chivulete (Bucharest)

29 November 2019 18	Dinamo București	1–0	Politehnica Iași	Bucharest
20:30 EET (UTC+2)	Perović 47'			Stadium: Dinamo; Attendance: 1,362; Referee: Iulian Călin (Ștefănești, Argeș)

4 December 2019 19	Dinamo București	4–1	Chindia Târgoviște	Bucharest
20:30 EET (UTC+2)	Pițian 32' (o.g.); Grigore 69'; Perović 82' (pen.); Montini 90+4'		47' Benga	Stadium: Dinamo; Attendance: 1,053; Referee: Marian Barbu (Făgăraș)

7 December 2019 20	Hermannstadt	4–2	Dinamo București	Sibiu
20:30 EET (UTC+2)	Yazalde 15', 86'; Dâlbea 69'; Viera 77'		50' Sorescu; 90+1' Perović	Stadium: Municipal; Attendance: 4,000; Referee: Marius Avram (Bucharest)

13 December 2019 21	Dinamo București	1–2	Sepsi Sfântu Gheorghe	Bucharest
20:30 EET (UTC+2)	Nistor 60'		76', 78' Karanović	Stadium: Dinamo; Attendance: 950; Referee: Iulian Călin (Ștefănești, Argeș)

19 December 2019 22	Botoșani	1–0	Dinamo București	Botoșani
20:00 EET (UTC+2)	Cîmpanu 90'			Stadium: Municipal; Attendance: 2,780; Referee: Radu Petrescu (Bucharest)

1 February 2020 23	Dinamo București	2–0	Astra Giurgiu	Bucharest
20:00 EET (UTC+2)	Perović 65' (pen.); Grigore 73'			Stadium: Dinamo; Attendance: 2,816; Referee: Ovidiu Hațegan (Arad)

9 February 2020 24	Voluntari	2–1	Dinamo București	Voluntari
17:00 EET (UTC+2)	Țîră 76'; Tudorie 81'		38' Sorescu	Stadium: Anghel Iordănescu; Attendance: 1,850; Referee: Adrian Cojocaru (Galați)

16 February 2020 25	Dinamo București	2–1	FCSB	Bucharest
20:00 EET (UTC+2)	Sin 37'; Lazăr 62'		45+9' (pen.) Tănase	Stadium: Arena Națională; Attendance: 27,668; Referee: Horațiu Feșnic (Cluj-Napoca)

23 February 2020 26	Gaz Metan Mediaș	1–0	Dinamo București	Mediaș
16:30 EET (UTC+2)	Dumitru 14'			Stadium: Gaz Metan; Attendance: 8,000; Referee: István Kovács (Carei)

==== Relegation round ====
===== Table =====
Pos	Team	Pld	W	D	L	GF	GA	GD	Pts	Qualification or relegation
7	Viitorul Constanța	14	6	5	3	25	17	+8	43	
8	Hermannstadt	12	6	4	2	18	14	+4	35	
9	Sepsi OSK	13	4	5	4	19	17	+2	34	
10	Academica Clinceni	14	7	0	7	14	21	−7	32	
11	Voluntari	14	6	3	5	16	12	+4	31	
12	Politehnica Iași	14	5	4	5	17	17	0	30	
13	Dinamo București	9	2	2	5	8	11	−3	25	
14	Chindia Târgoviște (O)	12	3	1	8	9	17	−8	23	Qualification for the relegation play-offs

Source: Soccerway, FRF (in Romanian), LPF (in Romanian)
Rules for classification: 1) Points; 2) Points without rounding; 3) Head-to-head points; 4) Head-to-head goal difference; 5) Head-to-head goals scored; 6) Goal difference; 7) Goals scored; 8) Play-off (only if needed to decide teams for relegation). (Note: only criteria 6 and 7 are applied to establish the classification during the competition.)
(O) Play-off winners

===== Results summary =====
Overall								Home						Away					
Pld	W	D	L	GF	GA	GD	Pts	W	D	L	GF	GA	GD	W	D	L	GF	GA	GD
9	2	2	5	8	11	−3	8	0	2	3	3	7	−4	2	0	2	5	4	+1

Last updated: 5 August 2020.
Source: Liga I

===== Results by round =====
Round	1	2	3	4	5	6	7	8	9
Ground	H	A	H	H	A	A	H	A	H
Result	L	L	L	L	L	W	D	W	D
Position	9	10	13	14	14	13	13	13	13

Updated to match(es) played on 5 August 2020. Source: Liga I
A = Away; H = Home; W = Win; D = Draw; L = Loss

===== Matches =====
Win Draw Loss

28 February 2020 1	Dinamo București	0–1	Academica Clinceni	Bucharest
20:30 EET (UTC+2)			71' Buziuc	Stadium: Dinamo; Attendance: 620; Referee: Marcel Bîrsan (Bucharest)

7 March 2020 2	Politehnica Iași	1–0	Dinamo București	Iași
21:00 EET (UTC+2)	Cristea 85'			Stadium: Emil Alexandrescu; Referee: Sebastian Colțescu (Craiova)

3	Dinamo București	v	Chindia Târgoviște	Bucharest
20:00 EEST (UTC+3)				Stadium: Dinamo
Note: The match should have been played on 16 March 2020 but it was rescheduled for 13 June 2020, due to the COVID-19 pandemic. The match was again postponed due to confirmed cases of COVID-19 within Dinamo's squad.

4	Hermannstadt	v	Dinamo București	Sibiu
20:00 EEST (UTC+3)				Stadium: Municipal
Note: The match should have been played on 22 March 2020 but it was rescheduled for 20 June 2020, due to the COVID-19 pandemic. The match was again postponed due to confirmed cases of COVID-19 within Dinamo's squad.

21 June 2020 5	Dinamo București	1–3	Sepsi Sfântu Gheorghe	Bucharest
17:00 EEST (UTC+3)	Moldoveanu 90+3'		1' Šafranko; 80' (pen.) Vașvari; 86' Ștefan; (red card) 38' Tincu	Stadium: Dinamo; Attendance: 0 Referee: Sebastian Colțescu (Craiova)
Note: The match should have been played on 4/5 April 2020 but it was postponed due to the COVID-19 pandemic.

28 June 2020 6	Dinamo București	0–1	Voluntari	Bucharest
17:00 EEST (UTC+3)	Filip (yellow card) 29' (yellow-red card) 49'		76' Gheorghe	Stadium: Dinamo; Attendance: 0 Referee: Ovidiu Hațegan (Arad)
Note: The match should have been played on 11/12 April 2020 but it was postponed due to the COVID-19 pandemic.

2 July 2020 7	Viitorul Constanța	1–0	Dinamo București	Ovidiu
20:00 EEST (UTC+3)	Ghiță 17'			Stadium: Viitorul; Attendance: 0 Referee: George Găman (Craiova)
Note: The match should have been played on 18/19 April 2020 but it was postponed due to the COVID-19 pandemic.

5 July 2020 8	Academica Clinceni	1–3	Dinamo București	Clinceni
17:00 EEST (UTC+3)	Buziuc 72'		19' (pen.) Sorescu; 65' Bani; 71' Fabbrini	Stadium: Clinceni; Attendance: 0 Referee: István Kovács (Carei)
Note: The match should have been played on 25/26 April 2020 but it was postponed due to the COVID-19 pandemic.

12 July 2020 9	Dinamo București	1–1	Politehnica Iași	Bucharest
18:00 EEST (UTC+3)	Sorescu 10' (pen.)		85' (pen.) Cristea	Stadium: Dinamo; Attendance: 0 Referee: Andrei Chivulete (București)
Note: The match should have been played on 2/3 May 2020 but it was postponed due to the COVID-19 pandemic.

10	Chindia Târgoviște	v	Dinamo București	Ploiești
20:00 EEST (UTC+3)				Stadium: Ilie Oană
Note: The match should have been played on 9/10 May 2020 but it was postponed due to the COVID-19 pandemic. The match was again postponed due to confirmed cases of COVID-19 within Dinamo's squad.

22 July 2020 11	Dinamo București	v	Hermannstadt	Bucharest
20:00 EEST (UTC+3)				Stadium: Dinamo
Note: The match should have been played on 16/17 May 2020 but it was postponed due to the COVID-19 pandemic.

25 July 2020 12	Sepsi Sfântu Gheorghe	v	Dinamo București	Sfântu Gheorghe
20:00 EEST (UTC+3)				Stadium: Municipal
Note: The match should have been played on 19/20/21 May 2020 but it was postponed due to the COVID-19 pandemic.

2 August 2020 13	Voluntari	1–2	Dinamo București	Voluntari
21:30 EEST (UTC+3)	Căpățînă 63' (pen.)		34' Sorescu; 76' Mrzljak	Stadium: Anghel Iordănescu; Attendance: 0 Referee: Iulian Călin (Ștefănești, Argeș)
Note: The match should have been played on 24 May 2020 but it was postponed due to the COVID-19 pandemic.

5 August 2020 14	Dinamo București	1–1	Viitorul Constanța	Bucharest
17:00 EEST (UTC+3)	Sorescu 37'		35' (pen.) Achim	Stadium: Dinamo; Attendance: 0 Referee: Cătălin Popa (Pitești)
Note: The match should have been played on 31 May 2020 but it was postponed due to the COVID-19 pandemic.

=== Cupa României ===
Dinamo București entered the Cupa României at the Round of 32.

24 September 2019 Round of 32	UTA Arad	1–3	Dinamo București	Arad
16:30 EEST (UTC+3)	Moise 19'		13' Moldoveanu; 58' Nistor; 82' Neicuțescu	Stadium: Motorul; Attendance: 4,000; Referee: Horațiu Fesnic (Cluj-Napoca)

30 October 2019 Round of 16	Foresta Suceava	0–4	Dinamo București	Suceava
19:30 EET (UTC+2)			9' Grigore; 62', 87' Perović; 70' Moldoveanu	Stadium: Areni; Attendance: 7,000; Referee: Adrian Cojocaru (Galați)

3 March 2020 QF	Academica Clinceni	0–1	Dinamo București	Bucharest
20:00 EET (UTC+2)			9' Sorescu	Stadium: Dinamo; Attendance: 1,000; Referee: Radu Petrescu (Bucharest)

25 June 2020 SF 1st leg	Dinamo București	0–3	FCSB	Bucharest
20:00 EEST (UTC+3)			32' Popa; 75' Olaru; 82' Dumitru	Stadium: Dinamo; Attendance: 0 Referee: István Kovács (Carei)

8 July 2020 SF 2nd leg	FCSB	1–0	Dinamo București	Bucharest
20:00 EEST (UTC+3)	Petre 2'			Stadium: Arena Națională; Attendance: 0 Referee: Horațiu Feșnic (Cluj-Napoca)

== Statistics ==
=== Appearances and goals ===
As of 5 August 2020

No.	Pos	Player	Liga I		Cupa României		Total	
No.	Pos	Player	Apps	Goals	Apps	Goals	Apps	Goals
1	GK	(Romania) Cătălin Straton	9	0	4	0	13	0
2	DF	(Romania) Szabolcs Kilyén	5	0	1	0	6	0
5	MF	(Romania) Alexandru Răuță	25	0	3	0	28	0
6	DF	(Romania) Marco Ehmann	2	0	0	0	2	0
7	DF	(Slovakia) Lukáš Skovajsa	11	0	2	0	13	0
8	MF	(Romania) Valentin Lazăr	12	1	3	0	15	1
16	DF	(Romania) Mihai Popescu	24	1	3	0	27	1
18	FW	(Serbia) Slavko Perović	17	6	2	2	19	8
19	FW	(Romania) Daniel Popa	33	4	4	0	37	4
20	MF	(Romania) Andrei Sin	14	1	2	0	16	1
21	MF	(Romania) Mihai Neicuțescu	9	0	2	1	11	1
22	MF	(Romania) Deian Sorescu	31	10	5	1	36	11
23	MF	(Romania) Ionuț Șerban	4	0	1	0	5	0
24	MF	(Croatia) Filip Mrzljak	24	2	2	0	26	2
26	DF	(Slovakia) Kristián Koštrna	8	0	2	0	10	0
27	DF	(Romania) Ricardo Grigore	18	2	4	1	22	3
28	MF	(Romania) Valentin Borcea	1	0	1	0	2	0
31	MF	(Italy) Diego Fabbrini	17	1	2	0	19	1
38	MF	(Romania) Andrei Bani	6	1	1	0	7	1
43	DF	(Italy) Mattia Montini	22	4	2	0	24	4
66	DF	(Croatia) Ante Puljić	22	1	4	0	26	1
98	MF	(Romania) Andreas Mihaiu	16	0	3	0	19	0
99	FW	(Romania) Robert Moldoveanu	28	2	4	2	32	4
Players transferred out or loaned out during the season
2	DF	(Lithuania) Linas Klimavičius	10	1	1	0	11	1
4	MF	(Romania) Ioan Filip	25	1	4	0	29	1
6	DF	(Romania) Florin Bejan	4	0	0	0	4	0
7	FW	(Cape Verde) Brito	4	0	1	0	5	0
8	MF	(Mauritius) Kévin Bru	8	0	1	0	9	0
10	MF	(Romania) Dan Nistor	16	4	2	1	18	5
13	DF	(Romania) Denis Ciobotariu	18	2	2	0	20	2
31	MF	(Romania) Geani Crețu	2	0	0	0	2	0
33	DF	(Romania) Laurențiu Corbu	16	0	2	0	18	0
88	DF	(Brazil) Gabriel de Moura	12	0	2	0	14	0
93	GK	(Italy) Riccardo Piscitelli	26	0	1	0	27	0

=== Squad statistics ===
	Liga I	Cupa României	Home	Away	Total Stats
Games played	35	5	19	21	40
Games won	12	3	9	6	15
Games drawn	6	0	4	2	6
Games lost	17	2	6	13	19
Goals scored	45	8	28	25	53
Goals conceded	52	5	22	35	57
Goal difference	-7	3	6	-10	-4
Clean sheets	6	2	5	3	8
Yellow cards	105	16	50	67	121
Red cards	4	0	3	1	4
Winning rate	34.2%	60%	47.3%	28.5%	37.5%

Last updated: 5 August 2020
Source: Competitive matches

=== Goalscorers ===
As of 5 August 2020

Rank	Position	Name	Liga I	Cupa României	Total
1	MF	Deian Sorescu	10	1	11
2	FW	Slavko Perović	6	2	8
3	MF	Dan Nistor	4	1	5
4	FW	Daniel Popa	4	0	4
4	FW	Mattia Montini	4	0	4
4	DF	Robert Moldoveanu	2	2	4
7	DF	Ricardo Grigore	2	1	3
8	DF	Denis Ciobotariu	2	0	2
8	MF	Filip Mrzljak	2	0	2
9	DF	Linas Klimavičius	1	0	1
9	DF	Mihai Popescu	1	0	1
9	FW	Mihai Neicuțescu	0	1	1
9	DF	Ante Puljić	1	0	1
9	MF	Ioan Filip	1	0	1
9	DF	Andrei Sin	1	0	1
9	MF	Valentin Lazăr	1	0	1
9	MF	Andrei Bani	1	0	1
9	FW	Diego Fabbrini	1	0	1
9		Own goals	1	0	1
Total			45	8	53

=== Goal minutes ===
	1'–15'	16'–30'	31'–HT	46'–60'	61'–75'	76'–FT	Extra time	Forfeit
Goals	4	6	7	10	14	13	0	0
Percentage	7.55%	11.32%	13.21%	18.87%	26.42%	24.53%	0%	0%

Last updated: 5 August 2020 (UTC)
Source: Soccerway

=== Hat-tricks ===
Player	Against	Result	Date	Competition
Daniel Popa	Academica Clinceni	4–2	2 August	Liga I

=== Clean sheets ===
As of 5 August 2020

Rank	Name	Liga I	Cupa României	Total	Games played
1	Riccardo Piscitelli	6	0	6	27
2	Cătălin Straton	0	2	2	13
Total		6	2	8	40

=== Disciplinary record ===
As of 5 August 2020

No.	Pos.	Player	Liga I			Cupa României			Total		
No.	Pos.	Player	Yellow card	(yellow card) (yellow-red card)	Red card	Yellow card	(yellow card) (yellow-red card)	Red card	Yellow card	(yellow card) (yellow-red card)	Red card
1	GK	Cătălin Straton	2	0	0	0	0	0	2	0	0
2	DF	Linas Klimavičius	1	0	0	1	0	0	2	0	0
2	DF	Szabolcs Kilyén	2	0	0	0	0	0	2	0	0
4	MF	Ioan Filip	6	1	0	0	0	0	6	1	0
5	MF	Alexandru Răuță	7	0	0	0	0	0	7	0	0
6	DF	Florin Bejan	1	0	0	0	0	0	1	0	0
6	DF	Marco Ehmann	1	0	0	0	0	0	1	0	0
7	DF	Lukáš Skovajsa	3	1	0	0	0	0	3	1	0
8	MF	Kévin Bru	1	0	0	0	0	0	1	0	0
8	MF	Valentin Lazăr	4	0	0	1	0	0	5	0	0
10	MF	Dan Nistor	4	1	0	0	0	0	4	1	0
13	DF	Denis Ciobotariu	5	0	0	0	0	0	5	0	0
16	DF	Mihai Popescu	7	0	0	1	0	0	8	0	0
18	FW	Slavko Perović	1	0	0	0	0	0	1	0	0
19	FW	Daniel Popa	3	0	0	1	0	0	4	0	0
20	DF	Andrei Sin	2	0	0	0	0	0	2	0	0
21	FW	Mihai Neicuțescu	2	0	0	1	0	0	3	0	0
22	MF	Deian Sorescu	8	1	0	0	0	0	9	1	0
23	MF	Ionuț Șerban	2	0	0	0	0	0	2	0	0
24	MF	Filip Mrzljak	4	0	0	1	0	0	5	0	0
26	DF	Kristián Koštrna	3	0	0	0	0	0	3	0	0
27	DF	Ricardo Grigore	1	0	0	2	0	0	3	0	0
31	MF	Diego Fabbrini	3	0	0	2	0	0	5	0	0
33	DF	Laurențiu Corbu	7	0	0	1	0	0	8	0	0
38	MF	Andrei Bani	1	0	0	0	0	0	1	0	0
43	FW	Mattia Montini	5	0	0	2	0	0	7	0	0
66	DF	Ante Puljić	8	0	0	1	0	0	9	0	0
88	DF	Gabriel de Moura	1	0	0	1	0	0	2	0	0
93	GK	Riccardo Piscitelli	2	0	0	0	0	0	2	0	0
98	MF	Andreas Mihaiu	1	0	0	0	0	0	1	0	0
99	FW	Robert Moldoveanu	3	0	0	1	0	0	4	0	0
Total			101	4	0	16	0	0	117	4	0

=== Attendances ===
As of 28 February 2020

	Matches	Attendances	Average	High	Low
Liga I	14	64,729	4,624	27,668	620
Cupa României	0	0	0	0	0
Total	14	64,729	4,624	27,668	620

== See also ==
- 2019–20 Cupa României
- 2019–20 Liga I
