= Diego Fabbrini =

Italian footballer (born 1990)

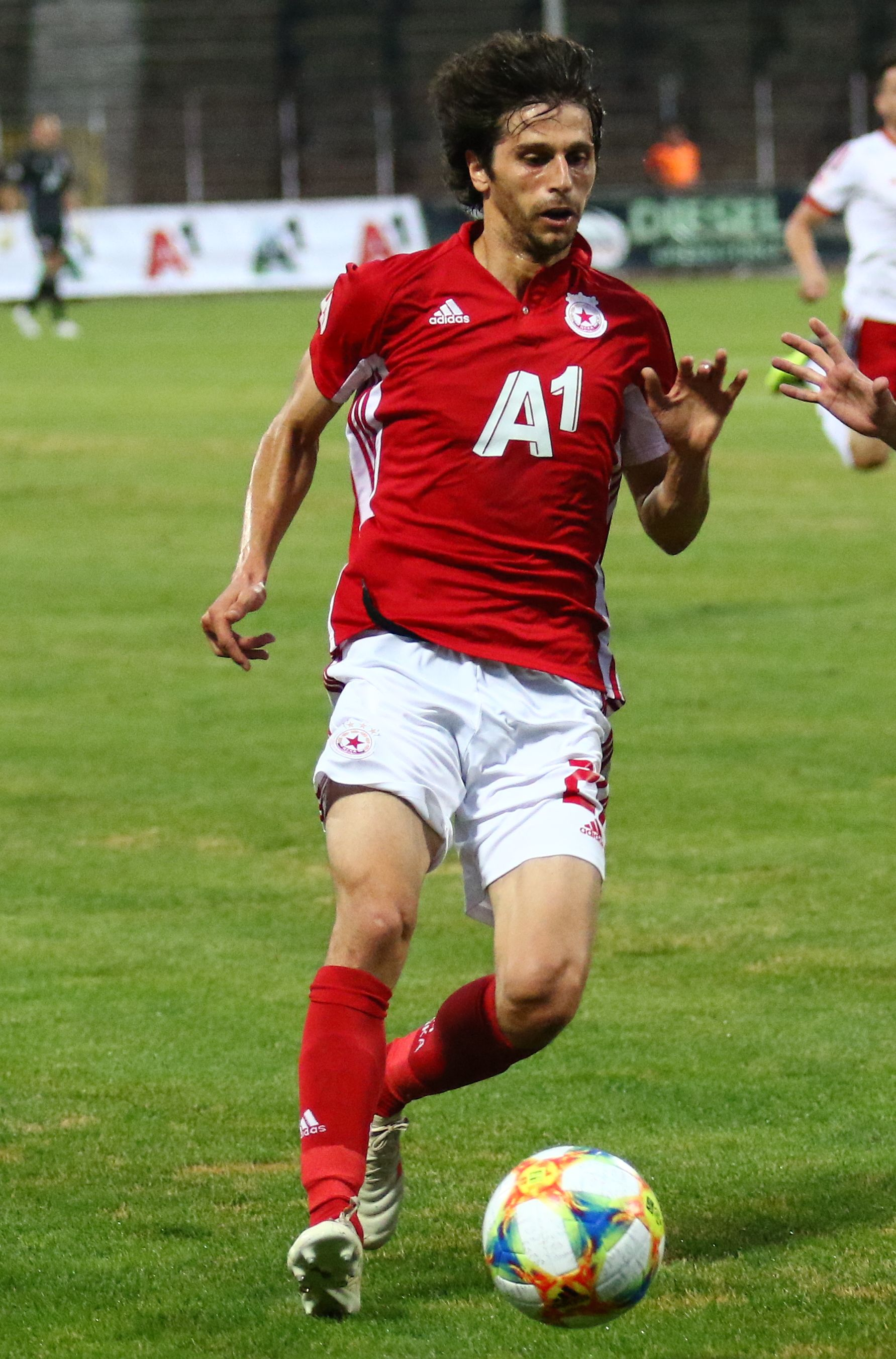
- Fabbrini in CSKA Sofia in 2019

Personal information
- Full name: Diego Fabbrini
- Date of birth: 31 July 1990 (age 36)
- Place of birth: San Giuliano Terme, Italy
- Height: 1.82 m (6 ft 0 in)
- Position: Midfielder

Youth career
- 2003–2009: Empoli

Senior career*
Years	Team	Apps	(Gls)
2009–2010	Empoli	32	(2)
2010–2013	Udinese	21	(2)
2010–2011	→ Empoli (loan)	24	(1)
2013	→ Palermo (loan)	8	(1)
2013–2016	Watford	23	(1)
2014	→ Siena (loan)	10	(1)
2015	→ Millwall (loan)	12	(1)
2015	→ Birmingham City (loan)	5	(0)
2015–2016	→ Middlesbrough (loan)	22	(4)
2016–2018	Birmingham City	21	(0)
2017	→ Spezia (loan)	17	(1)
2017–2018	→ Oviedo (loan)	17	(1)
2018–2019	Botoșani	31	(5)
2019	CSKA Sofia	5	(0)
2019–2021	Dinamo București	52	(2)
2021–2023	Ascoli	11	(0)
2022	→ Alessandria (loan)	12	(0)
2023	Lucchese	11	(0)
2024–2025	Sambenedettese	31	(1)

International career
2010–2011	Italy U21	12	(1)
2012	Italy	1	(0)
- * Club domestic league appearances and goals as of 4 May 2025

Diego Fabbrini (Italian pronunciation: [ˈdjɛːɡo fabˈbriːni]; born 31 July 1990) is an Italian professional footballer who plays as a midfielder.

He previously played for Empoli, where his career began, Udinese, Watford, Birmingham City, Botoșani, CSKA Sofia, Dinamo București, Ascoli and Lucchese, with loan spells at Palermo, Siena, Millwall, Middlesbrough, Spezia, Oviedo and Alessandria. He has been capped once for Italy.

== Club career ==
=== Empoli ===
Born in San Giuliano Terme, Italy, Fabbrini began his career at Empoli when he signed for the club at 13 years old. He said in an interview, saying: "I took my first steps at the Zambra football school, where I grew up really well. I managed to show off with important performances and so came the right specimen The Empoli observers have noticed me, followed me and ... I am still in this very important club." After two years at Empoli, he was promoted to the first team.

He made his first team debut for Empoli on 21 August 2009, coming on as a substitute for Francesco Lodi, in a 2–0 win over Piacenza. In his first season as a professional player, at 19 years old, he became a regular and made 30 appearances, scoring a solitary goal in the 2009–10 Serie B campaign, which was against A.S. Cittadella on 6 March 2010.

His performance at Empoli attracted interests from top Serie A clubs throughout the 2009–10 season and in the summer transfer window. At one point, Empoli rejected a bid from Genoa and Napoli.

In the 2010–11 season, Fabbrini appeared the first three matches of the season for Empoli, including scoring in a 3–2 win over Frosinone on 22 August 2010. Fabbrini's first game after signing for the club on loan from Udinese for the 2010–11 season came on 11 September 2010, in a 1–1 draw against Triestina. He then scored his second goal of the season, in a 3–0 win over Siena on 18 October 2010. Despite being sidelined during the 2010–11 season, Fabbrini went on to make 28 appearances and scoring 2 times in all competitions.

=== Udinese ===
On 31 August 2010, Udinese signed Fabbrini and Gabriele Angella in a co-ownership deal for a total of €3 million. As part of the deal, Ricardo Chará and Flavio Lazzari joined Empoli, also in a co-ownership deal for a small fee, and Fabbrini would remain at Empoli for the 2010–11 season.

Fabbrini returned to Udine for the 2011–12 season and made his competitive debut on 24 August 2011, replacing Giampiero Pinzi after 63 minutes of the Champions League play-off round second leg at home to Arsenal; Udinese lost 2–1 and were eliminated. On 31 August 2011, Udinese bought the remaining 50% registration rights from Empoli and Daniele Mori in a co-ownership deal, also from Empoli for a total of €2.4 million. On 25 September 2011, Fabbrini made his Serie A debut, in an away match against Cagliari He then set up a goal for Medhi Benatia to score the opener, in a 2–0 win over Atlético Madrid in the UEFA Europa League Group Stage. Fabbrini spent most of the 2011–12 season on the substitute bench, although he was feature in number of matches. However, in a 2–2 draw against Napoli on 18 March 2012, he was sent–off for a second bookable offence and missed one game as a result. He scored his first Serie A goal in a 1–0 win against Cesena on 2 May 2012. In the last game of the season, Fabbrini scored his second goal of the season, in a 2–0 win over Catania. Despite being sidelined with injuries during the 2011–12 season, he finished the season, making 25 appearances and scoring 2 times in all competitions.

In the 2012–13 season, Fabbrini was featured in the first team, where he mostly came on the substitute. But he started in number of UEFA Europa League matches. On 8 November 2012, Fabbrini scored his first UEFA Europa League goal, in a 3–2 loss against BSC Young Boys. Seven days later on 15 November 2012, he extended his contract with Udinese to 2017. However, despite signing a contract, Fabbrini's first team opportunities at Udinese became limited much further, leading him to leave the club in January to gain first team football.

On 31 January 2013, Serie A club Palermo announced the signing of Fabbrini from Udinese on loan until the end of the 2012–13 season. Fabbrini made his Palermo debut on 3 February 2013, starting the match and played 68 minutes before being substituted, in a 2–1 loss against Atalanta. Seven days later, on 10 February 2013, he scored his first Palermo goal, in a 1–1 draw against Pescara. However, towards the end of the season, Fabbrini soon have his playing time at Palermo reduced and finished the season, making 8 appearances and scoring once for the side. At the end of the 2012–13 season, he returned to his parent club.

=== Watford ===
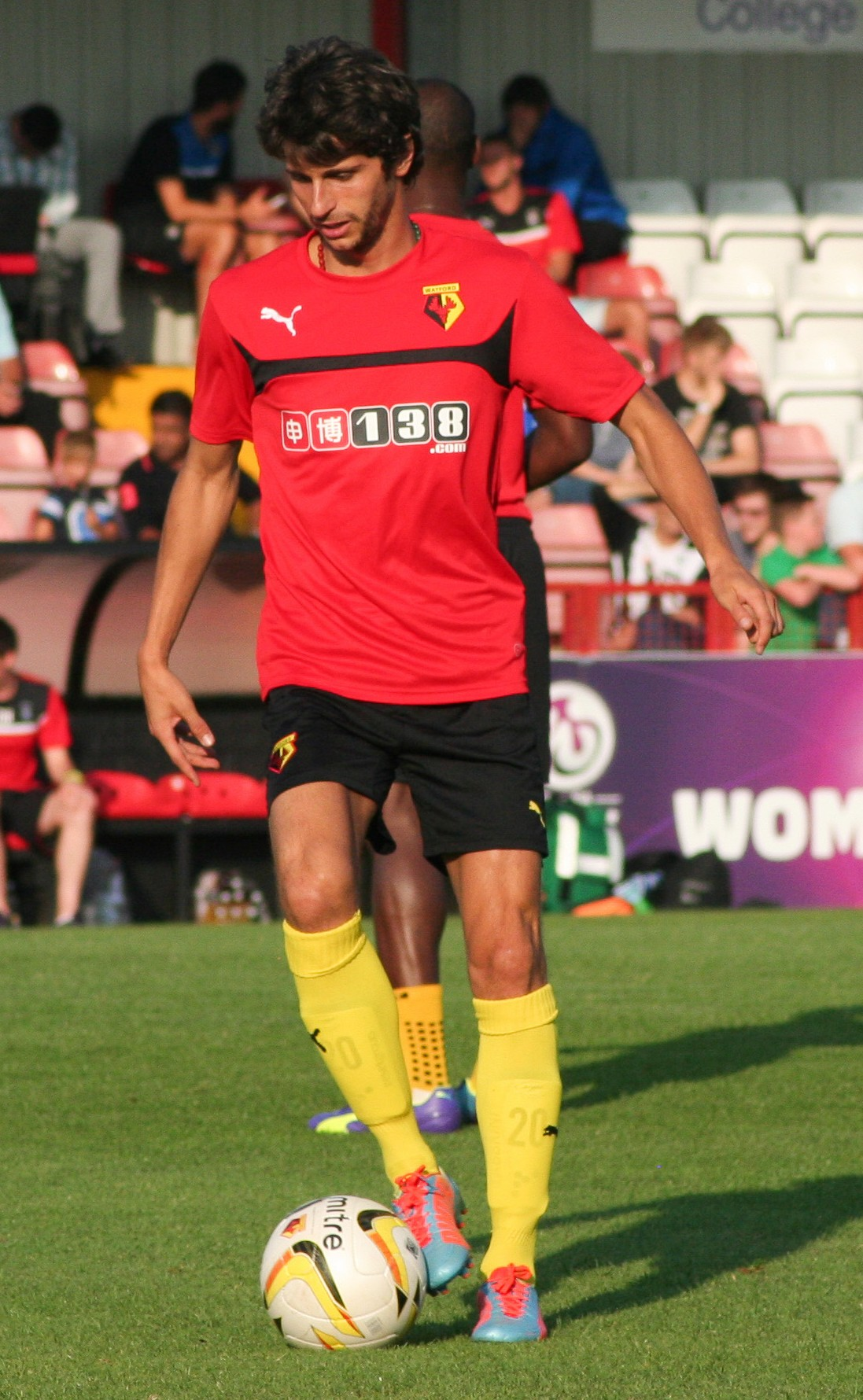
Fabbrini playing for Watford in 2014

On 19 July 2013, Fabbrini was one of seven Udinese players to join Watford on permanent deals; he signed a contract until 2017.

He made his debut as a substitute in a 1–0 win away to Birmingham City on 3 August 2013, and scored his first goal for the club two weeks later in a 3–3 draw with Reading. He made his first league start a week later in a 1–1 draw with Nottingham Forest. However, despite making an impression for the side, Fabbrini found himself behind the pecking order in the first team. This also combined with injury concerns. By the time he departed for Siena, he went on to make 25 appearances for Watford this season.

In the 2014–15 season, Fabbrini returned to the club on loan from Siena and was given a first team chance by new manager Giuseppe Sannino. His first appearance of the season came on 12 August 2014 against Stevenage in the first round of the League Cup, where he set up a goal for Lloyd Dyer to score the only goal in the game with a win for Watford. However, Fabbrini found his first team opportunities at Watford limited again, as he was not involved in the first team since September.

==== Loan spells from Watford ====
Fabbrini joined Serie B side Siena on 31 January 2014 on loan for the remainder of the 2013–14 season. He made his Siena debut on 8 February 2014, where he set up a goal for Pierluigi Cappelluzzo to score his first goal in his professional career, in a 2–1 loss against Bari. On 29 March 2014, he scored his first goal for Siena, in a 2–1 win over Brescia. His first team involvement at Siena for the rest of the season ended up making 10 appearances and scoring once.

He signed for Millwall on 15 January 2015 on a 93-day loan deal, and made his debut two days later against Ipswich Town in a 3–1 defeat. On 24 February 2015, he scored his first Millwall goal, in a 3–1 loss against Sheffield Wednesday. Fabbrini made eleven starts under Ian Holloway's management, scoring once, but played only a few minutes in Millwall's three matches following Holloway's dismissal on 10 March. On the last day of the loan window, 26 March, Watford recalled him from Millwall, which Manager Neil Harris said: "Watford got in touch at 3.30pm, just before the deadline, to say they were recalling their player and sending him off to somewhere else because he was going to start games." During his time at Millwall, which he made 12 appearances and scoring once for the side, Fabbrini became a fan favourite for the side, due to his silky skills and mazy runs.

Shortly after being recalled by Watford, he was immediately loaned out to fellow Championship club Birmingham City for the rest of the season. An unused substitute for Birmingham's next match, Fabbrini was expected to start in the visit to AFC Bournemouth three days later, but broke his nose in training. He received treatment in Italy and returned wearing a protective mask to start the 2–1 win against Wolverhampton Wanderers on 11 April, replacing Andy Shinnie in the playmaker role. He finished the season with five appearances.

On 27 July 2015, Fabbrini joined Middlesbrough on loan until the end of the 2015–16 season. He made his Middlesbrough debut, coming on as a substitute, in a 0–0 draw against Preston North End in the opening game of the season. In a follow-up match against Bolton Wanderers, Fabbrini scored his first Middlesbrough goal, as well as, setting up a goal for Kike, who scored in a 3–0. He added two more goals against Oldham Athletic and Sheffield Wednesday. Since joining Middlesbrough, he quickly become the club's fan favourite. He added two more goals in September against Wolverhampton Wanderers and Leeds United. By January, he added two more goals against Wolverhampton Wanderers and Burnley, adding his tally to six in his Middlesbrough career. Although there was no clause in the contract permitting a mid-season recall, once Middlesbrough signed Southampton's playmaker Gastón Ramírez on loan in the January 2016 transfer window, they agreed to a release allowing Fabbrini's loan to be terminated. Throughout his time at Middlesbrough, Fabbrini became a first team regular for the side and helped the side reach the top positions of the Championship. Despite being faded into a squad player before suffering an injury in early January, Fabbrini went on to make 26 appearances and scoring 6 times in all competitions.

=== Birmingham City ===
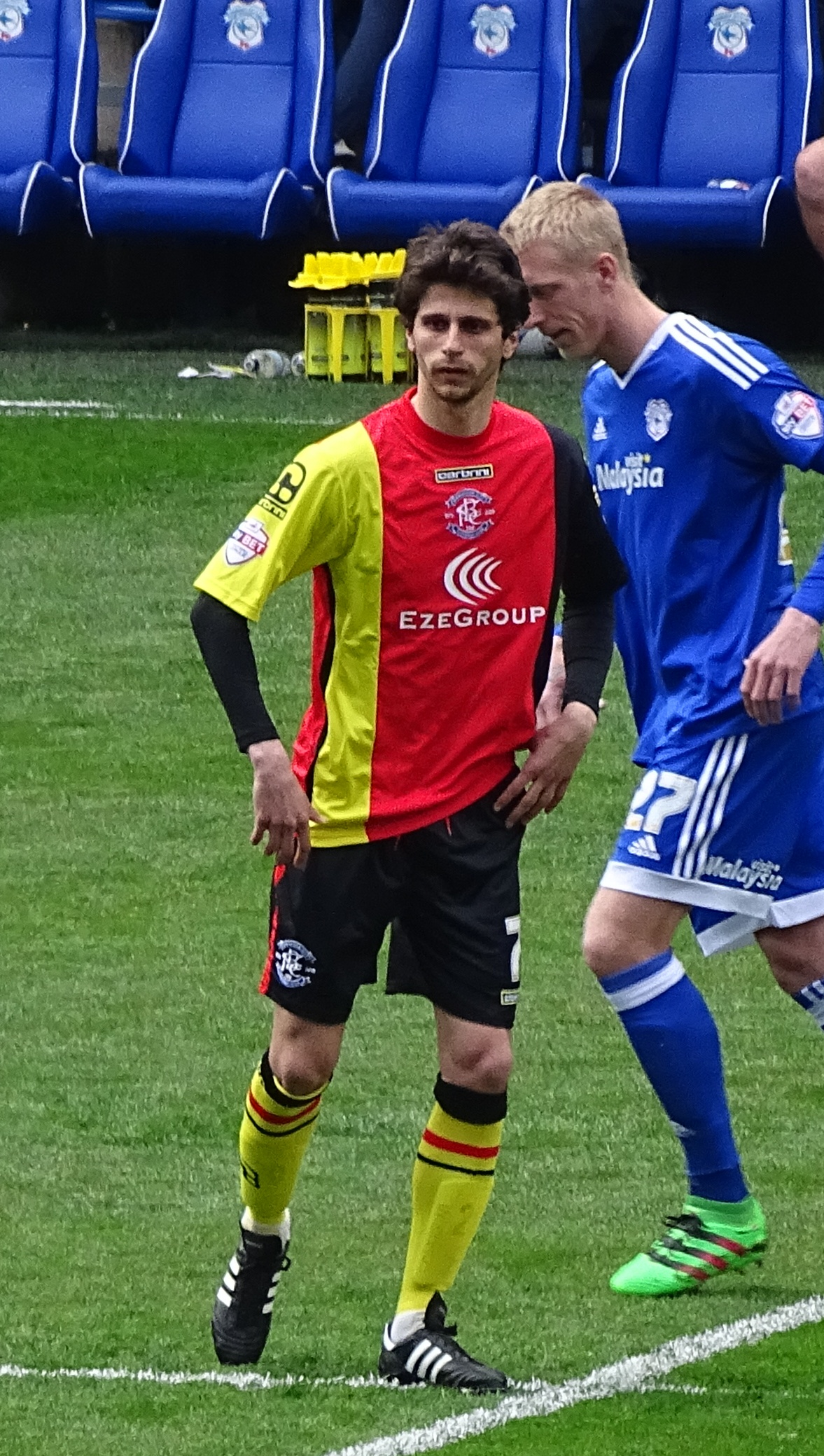
Fabbrini playing for Birmingham City in 2016

Fabbrini signed a three-and-a-half-year contract with Championship club Birmingham City on 27 January 2016. The fee, of £1.5 million, was the highest the club had paid for five years.

He made his second debut three days later, as a 62nd-minute substitute in a goalless draw away to Bristol City. On 23 February 2016, Fabbrini assisted Clayton Donaldson to score the only goal of a 1–0 win over Bolton Wanderers. He was initially unable to force himself into the starting eleven ahead of Jon Toral – Birmingham's player of the year – in manager Gary Rowett's favoured 4–2–3–1 formation, and acquired a reputation as a "diver", but when Toral was injured in the later part of the season, Fabbrini made what the Birmingham Mail called an "increasingly influential" contribution.

In 2016–17, Rowett abandoned that formation, which left Fabbrini without a natural position. By Christmas, he had made only two league starts, and it became increasingly likely that he would leave in the January transfer window.

==== Loan spells from Birmingham City ====
On 23 January 2017, Fabbrini agreed a loan deal with Serie B club Spezia until the end of the season, with an option to purchase at a fee reported by the Corriere dello Sport as €1.5 million. He made his Spezia debut on 30 January 2017, in a 3–2 win over Latina Calcio. On 11 February, Fabbrini scored his first goal for the club, in a 2–0 loss against Pro Vercelli. He was sent off after 80 minutes of the next match as Spezia lost a 2–0 lead to draw with Trapani. He played regularly, making 17 appearances and scoring once as Spezia reached the play-offs. Spezia did not take up their option, and Fabbrini began pre-season training with Birmingham.

On 27 July 2017, he signed on loan for Real Oviedo for the 2017–18 season. Within days of his arrival, he tore an anterior cruciate ligament in training. After six months out, he finally made an appearance for the club on 4 February 2018, as a stoppage-time substitute with Oviedo leading Sporting Gijón 2–1; in such a brief debut, he still had a chance to make the score 3–1. Fabbrini scored his first and what proved only goal for Real Oviedo on 24 March, in a 1–1 draw with Córdoba. He finished the season with 17 appearances.

=== FC Botoșani ===
Fabbrini was not in Birmingham's plans for the coming season, and at the end of the transfer window, in September 2018, his contract was cancelled by mutual consent so that he could join Romanian Liga I club FC Botoșani. He made his debut on 15 September, and scored his first goal for the club on 8 October in a 2–0 win against Dinamo Bucharest.

=== CSKA Sofia ===
On 28 May 2019, CSKA Sofia announced that Fabbrini signed a three-year contract with the club.

=== Dinamo București ===
After just three months, Fabbrini moved on again, returning to Romania to join Liga I club Dinamo București. He stayed with Dinamo București for two seasons.

=== Ascoli ===
Fabbrini returned to Italian football for the 2021–22 season, signing a two-year contract with Serie B club Ascoli. He spent the second half of the season on loan to another second-tier club, Alessandria, but the team were relegated and they did not take up their option to buy.

=== Lucchese ===
On 31 January 2023, Fabbrini signed with Serie C club Lucchese until the end of the season.

== International career ==
Fabbrini made his debut for the Italy U-21 side on 3 September 2010 in a qualification match against Bosnia and Herzegovina played in Sarajevo. A month later on 8 October 2010, he set up a goal for Mattia Destro to score the opener, in a 2–1 win over Belarus and his performance earned him Man of the Match. He scored his first goal for the U-21s on 24 March 2011, in a friendly against Sweden. Fabbrini went on to make 12 appearances and scoring once for the U21 side.

Fabbrini was called up to the senior squad for a friendly on 15 August 2012 against England, to replace Mario Balotelli who had withdrawn at short notice through illness. He made his debut in the 2–1 defeat, replacing Mattia Destro for the final six minutes and receiving a yellow card.

== Personal life ==
Fabbrini is engaged to Rachele. He said about his free time when is not playing football: "No, no playstation, I joined the law and when I have some study time. I have already given Private and Roman Law, now I am preparing Constitutional." During his time at Middlesbrough, Fabbrini earned a nickname: "Diego Maradona", due to his skilful style.

== Career statistics ==
=== Club ===
As of 14 May 2025

Appearances and goals by club, season and competition
Club	Season	League			National cup (Note: Includes appearances in Coppa Italia, FA Cup, Copa del Rey, Cupa României, Bulgarian Cup)		League cup		Other		Total	
Club	Season	Division	Apps	Goals	Apps	Goals	Apps	Goals	Apps	Goals	Apps	Goals
Empoli	2009–10	Serie B	30	1	2	0	—		—		32	1
Empoli	2010–11	Serie B	26	2	2	0	—		—		28	2
Empoli	Total		56	3	4	0	—		—		60	4
Udinese	2011–12	Serie A	14	2	1	0	—		9 (Note: One appearance in UEFA Champions League, eight in UEFA Europa League)	0	24	2
Udinese	2012–13	Serie A	7	0	1	0	—		6 (Note: Two appearances in Champions League, four in Europa League)	1	14	1
Udinese	Total		21	2	2	0	—		15	1	38	3
Palermo (loan)	2012–13	Serie A	8	1	—		—		—		8	1
Watford	2013–14	Championship	21	1	2	0	2	0	—		25	1
Watford	2014–15	Championship	2	0	0	0	2	0	—		4	0
Watford	Total		23	1	2	0	4	0	—		29	1
Siena (loan)	2013–14	Serie B	10	1	—		—		—		10	1
Millwall (loan)	2014–15	Championship	12	1	—		—		—		12	1
Birmingham City (loan)	2014–15	Championship	5	0	—		—		—		5	0
Middlesbrough (loan)	2015–16	Championship	22	4	1	1	3	2	—		26	6
Birmingham City	2015–16	Championship	14	0	—		—		—		14	0
Birmingham City	2016–17	Championship	7	0	2	0	0	0	—		9	0
Birmingham City	Total		21	0	2	0	0	0	—		23	0
Spezia (loan)	2016–17	Serie B	17	1	—		—		1 (Note: Appearance in Serie B play-offs)	0	18	1
Real Oviedo	2017–18	Segunda División	17	1	0	0	—		—		17	1
Botoșani	2018–19	Liga I	31	5	1	0	—		—		32	5
CSKA Sofia	2019–20	First League	5	0	0	0	—		6 (Note: Appearances in Europa League)	0	11	0
Dinamo București	2019–20	Liga I	17	1	2	0	—		—		19	1
Dinamo București	2020–21	Liga I	35	1	4	2	—		—		39	3
Dinamo București	Total		52	2	6	2	—		—		58	4
Ascoli	2021–22	Serie B	11	0	1	0	—		—		12	0
Ascoli	2022–23	Serie B	0	0	0	0	—		—		0	0
Ascoli	Total		11	0	1	0	—		—		12	0
Alessandria (loan)	2021–22	Serie B	12	0	—		—		—		12	0
Lucchese	2022–23	Serie C	11	0	—		—		1 (Note: Appearance in Serie C play-offs)	0	12	0
Sambenedettese	2023–24	Serie D	15	1	2 (Note: Appearances in Coppa Italia Serie D)	0	—		0	0	17	1
Sambenedettese	2024–25	Serie D	16	0	0	0	—		2 (Note: Appearances in Poule Scudetto Serie D)	0	0	0
Sambenedettese	Total		31	1	2	0	—		2	0	35	1
Career total			365	23	21	3	7	2	25	1	418	29

=== International ===
As of 15 August 2012

Italy
Year	Apps	Goals
2012	1	0
Total	1	0

== Honours ==
Sambenedettese

- Serie D: 2024–25

Individual

- Ussi Toscana: 2010
