= Andreas Mihaiu =

Romanian footballer

Personal information
- Full name: Andreas Mircea Mihaiu
- Date of birth: 19 August 1998 (age 28)
- Place of birth: Slatina, Romania
- Height: 1.79 m (5 ft 10 1/2 in)
- Position: Right winger

Team information
- Current team: CSM Slatina
- Number: 98

Youth career
- 2008–2015: Inter Olt Slatina
- 2015–2017: Dinamo București

Senior career*
Years	Team	Apps	(Gls)
2017–2022	Dinamo București	44	(2)
2017–2018	→ Voința Turnu Măgurele (loan)	30	(12)
2018–2019	→ Chindia Târgoviște (loan)	29	(1)
2022–2023	Chindia Târgoviște	11	(1)
2023–2024	Gloria Buzău	16	(3)
2024–2026	CSM Slatina	33	(2)
2026	Unirea Alba Iulia	11	(3)
2026–	CSM Slatina	0	(0)
- * Club domestic league appearances and goals as of 28 May 2026

Andreas Mircea Mihaiu (born 19 August 1998) is a Romanian professional footballer who plays as a right winger for Liga III club Unirea Alba Iulia.

== Early career ==
Mihaiu was born in Slatina and start playing football for a local team. In 2015, he was noticed in a youth game by Ionel Dănciulescu, Mugurel Cornățeanu (ex-coach at Dinamo II) and Gabriel Răduță (head of Dinamo's Academy) and bought to Dinamo București.

== Career statistics ==
As of match played 19 August 2026

Appearances and goals by club, season and competition
Club	Season	League			Cupa României		Europe		Other		Total	
Club	Season	Division	Apps	Goals	Apps	Goals	Apps	Goals	Apps	Goals	Apps	Goals
Voința Turnu Măgurele (loan)	2017–18	Liga III	30	12	0	0	—		—		30	12
Chindia Târgoviște (loan)	2018–19	Liga II	29	1	0	0	—		—		29	1
Dinamo București	2019–20	Liga I	17	0	3	0	—		—		20	0
Dinamo București	2020–21	Liga I	17	1	3	0	—		—		20	1
Dinamo București	2021–22	Liga I	10	1	0	0	—		0	0	10	1
Dinamo București	Total		44	2	6	0	0	0	0	0	50	2
Chindia Târgoviște	2022–23	Liga I	11	1	4	0	—		—		15	1
Gloria Buzău	2023–24	Liga II	14	3	4	0	—		—		18	3
Gloria Buzău	2024–25	Liga I	2	0	1	0	—		—		3	0
Gloria Buzău	Total		16	3	5	0	—		—		21	3
CSM Slatina	2024–25	Liga II	19	2	—		—		—		19	2
CSM Slatina	2025–26	Liga II	14	0	3	1	—		—		17	1
CSM Slatina	Total		33	2	3	1	—		—		36	3
Unirea Alba Iulia	2025–26	Liga III	11	3	—		—		2 (Note: Appearances in Liga III promotion play-offs)	0	13	3
CSM Slatina	2026–27	Liga II	0	0	2	0	—		—		2	0
Career total			174	24	20	1	0	0	2	0	196	25

== Honours ==
Chindia Târgoviște

- Liga II: 2018–19
