= Jonathan Morsay =

Sierra Leonean footballer

Personal information
- Full name: Sahr Jonathan Morsay
- Date of birth: 5 October 1997 (age 29)
- Place of birth: Sundsvall, Sweden
- Height: 1.77 m (5 ft 10 in)
- Position: Winger

Team information
- Current team: Panionios
- Number: 25

Youth career
- 2009–2010: Kubikenborgs IF
- 2010–2016: GIF Sundsvall

Senior career*
Years	Team	Apps	(Gls)
2016–2020	GIF Sundsvall	47	(1)
2019	→ IK Brage (loan)	29	(7)
2020–2021	Chievo	11	(0)
2021	→ Dinamo București (loan)	16	(2)
2021–2023	Panetolikos	56	(3)
2023–2024	AEL Limassol	21	(2)
2024–2025	Kalamata	24	(7)
2025–	Panionios	22	(4)

International career^{‡}
2017	Sweden U19	2	(0)
2022–	Sierra Leone	11	(1)
- * Club domestic league appearances and goals as of 19 September 2026 ‡ National team caps and goals as of 21:00, 6 September 2024 (UTC)

Sahr Jonathan Morsay (born 5 October 1997) is a professional footballer who plays as a winger. Born in Sweden, he plays for Greek Super League 2 club Panionios and the Sierra Leone national team.

== Club career ==
=== Chievo ===
On 29 January 2020, he signed a 2.5-year contract with Italian Serie B club Chievo. He was loaned at Dinamo București in February 2021.

=== Panetolikos ===
On 6 August 2021, he joined Panetolikos on a two-year contract.

=== AEL Limassol ===
On 7 July 2023, he joined AEL Limassol FC on a free transfer. He scored his first goal with the team on the first game of the Cypriot First Division on 21 August 2023 against Doxa Katokopias FC and helped the team win the game.

== International career ==
Born in Sweden, Morsay was born to a Sierra Leonean father and Swedish mother. He is a youth international for Sweden. He debuted for the Sierra Leone national team in a friendly 3–0 loss to Togo on 24 March 2022.
