= Andrei Blejdea =

Romanian footballer

Personal information
- Full name: Andrei Cristian Blejdea
- Date of birth: 22 June 1996 (age 30)
- Place of birth: Bucharest, Romania
- Height: 1.82 m (6 ft 0 in)
- Position: Forward

Team information
- Current team: Gloria Bistrița
- Number: 23

Youth career
- –2014: Dinamo București
- 2014–2015: FC Wil
- 2015–2016: Domžale
- 2016: → Zarica Kranj (loan)

Senior career*
Years	Team	Apps	(Gls)
2014–2015	FC Wil	1	(0)
2016	Zarica Kranj	16	(2)
2016–2017	Eintracht Braunschweig II	15	(0)
2017–2018	Academica Clinceni	23	(4)
2018–2019	Pandurii Târgu Jiu	34	(8)
2019–2020	Argeș Pitești	36	(12)
2021	Dinamo București	10	(0)
2021–2022	Universitatea Cluj	16	(2)
2022	Hermannstadt	4	(1)
2022–2023	Gloria Buzău	19	(3)
2023	Chindia Târgoviște	3	(0)
2023	Tritium	8	(1)
2023–2024	PDHAE	13	(0)
2024–	Gloria Bistrița	0	(0)

International career
2012–2013	Romania U17	8	(0)
- * Club domestic league appearances and goals as of 12:50, 8 November 2024 (UTC)

Andrei Cristian Blejdea (born 22 June 1996) is a Romanian Ex-professional footballer who played as a forward for a lot of important and tradition teams in Romania like Dinamo Bucharest,”U” Cluj,FC Argeș . He played foregin in Switzerland,Germany,Italy and Slovenia .
