= Roberto Strechie =

Italian footballer

Personal information
- Full name: Roberto Gabriel Strechie
- Date of birth: 16 July 2000 (age 26)
- Place of birth: Venice, Italy
- Height: 1.74 m (5 ft 9 in)
- Position: Midfielder

Team information
- Current team: Villa Valle

Youth career
- –2018: Venezia

Senior career*
Years	Team	Apps	(Gls)
2016–2019	Venezia	1	(0)
2018–2019	→ Lucchese (loan)	11	(1)
2019–2020	Dinamo București	0	(0)
2020	Novara	0	(0)
2020–2021	Chiasso	30	(1)
2021–2022	Spinea	14	(1)
2022	Prato	15	(0)
2022	Este	6	(0)
2022–2023	Sona	19	(3)
2023–2024	Paradiso	29	(3)
2024–2025	Real Calepina	26	(1)
2025–2026	Sant'Angelo	28	(2)
2026–	Villa Valle	6	(1)
- * Club domestic league appearances and goals as of 15 February 2026

Roberto Gabriel Strechie (born 16 July 2000) is an Italian professional footballer who plays as a midfielder for Villa Valle.

== Club career ==
He made his debut for Venezia on 7 May 2017 in a game against Maceratese.

On 30 August 2019, he signed a contract with Dinamo București. He was released in January 2020. Strechie played for Dinamo only in friendly games.

On 24 January 2020, he signed a 3-year contract with Novara.

On 9 September 2020, he moved to Swiss club Chiasso.

== Honours ==
Venezia

- Lega Pro: 2016–17
- Serie D: 2015–16
- Coppa Italia Lega Pro: 2016–17
