= Dunarea Stadium (Giurgiu) =

Football stadium in Giurgiu, Romania

- Interactive map of Dunarea Stadium
- Address: Strada Portului, nr. 2
- Location: Giurgiu, Romania
- Coordinates: 43°52′40″N 25°58′04″E
- Owner: Municipality of Giurgiu
- Operator: Amicii Giurgiu
- Capacity: 1600
- Surface: Grass
- Field size: 105 x 68m

Construction
- Opened: 1980s

Dunărea Stadium (also often referred to as the „Port” Stadium) is a football venue located in the Port area of Giurgiu, Romania. It has a seating capacity of approximately 1,600.

The stadium features a main stand with a small executive area and a secondary stand. At the south end of the pitch, there is a building that houses the locker rooms, administrative offices, and storage facilities.

Since its inauguration, the stadium has been used almost continuously for events including third-division and county-level men's football, women's football, and American football.
