= Andrei Patache =

Romanian footballer

Personal information
- Full name: Andrei Alexandru Patache
- Date of birth: 29 October 1987 (age 39)
- Place of birth: Botoșani, Romania
- Height: 1.74 m (5 ft 9 in)
- Position: Right back

Team information
- Current team: Botoșani (assistant)

Youth career
- CSȘ Botoșani
- –2006: Victoria Botoșani

Senior career*
Years	Team	Apps	(Gls)
2007–2017	Botoșani	204	(2)
2017–2018	Concordia Chiajna	16	(0)
2018–2023	Botoșani	101	(2)
Total		321	(4)

Managerial career
- 2022–2023: Botoșani (player/assistant)
- 2023–: Botoșani (assistant)
- 2023: Botoșani (caretaker)
- * Club domestic league appearances and goals

Andrei Alexandru Patache (born 29 October 1987) is a former Romanian footballer who played as a right back, currently assistant coach at Liga I club Botoșani.

== Club career ==
He made his debut on the professional league level in the Liga I for Botoșani on 21 July 2013 as a starter in a game against CFR Cluj.

In the 2015-2016 season, he debuted in the Europa League in the Botosani jersey.

== Honours ==
Botoșani

- Liga II: 2012–13
