= Marko Brekalo =

Croatian professional footballer

Personal information
- Date of birth: 24 November 1992 (age 33)
- Place of birth: Zagreb, Croatia
- Height: 1.90 m (6 ft 3 in)
- Position: Forward

Team information
- Current team: Lučko
- Number: 26

Youth career
- 2002–2007: Hrvatski Dragovoljac
- 2007: Lokomotiva
- 2007–2009: Stupnik
- 2009–2011: Lokomotiva

Senior career*
Years	Team	Apps	(Gls)
2011–2013	Lokomotiva	0	(0)
2011	→ Dubrava (loan)		
2012	→ Gorica (loan)		
2012	→ Zelina (loan)	10	(0)
2013	→ Dubrava (loan)		
2013–2014	Vrapče		
2014–2015	Dubrava		
2015	Floridsdorfer AC	8	(0)
2016	Lučko	7	(1)
2016	Krka	15	(10)
2017	Cibalia	10	(1)
2017–2018	Šibenik	28	(5)
2018	Botoșani	5	(0)
2019	Hrvatski Dragovoljac	4	(0)
2020–2021	Krka	21	(6)
2021-	Lučko		
- * Club domestic league appearances and goals as of 22 June 2022

Marko Brekalo (born 24 November 1992) is a Croatian professional footballer who plays as a forward for NK Lučko.

== Club career ==
In his career Brekalo played mainly in Croatia for teams such as: Lokomotiva, Dubrava, HNK Gorica, Cibalia or Šibenik, among others, but he also played in Austria and Slovenia for Floridsdorfer AC and Krka. NK Krka.
