= Andrei Pițian =

Romanian footballer

Personal information
- Full name: Andrei Ovidiu Pițian
- Date of birth: 16 November 1995 (age 30)
- Place of birth: Târgu Jiu, Romania
- Height: 1.92 m (6 ft 4 in)
- Position: Centre-back

Team information
- Current team: Voluntari
- Number: 17

Youth career
- –2015: Pandurii Târgu Jiu

Senior career*
Years	Team	Apps	(Gls)
2015–2016	Pandurii Târgu Jiu	26	(0)
2017–2018	Astra Giurgiu	9	(0)
2017–2018	→ Apollon Limassol (loan)	3	(0)
2018–2019	Botoșani	12	(0)
2019–2021	Chindia Târgoviște	52	(1)
2021	Argeș Pitești	9	(0)
2022	Chindia Târgoviște	16	(0)
2022–2024	Universitatea Cluj	35	(0)
2024–	Voluntari	34	(1)

International career
2015	Romania U21	2	(0)
- * Club domestic league appearances and goals as of 4 November 2025

Andrei Ovidiu Pițian (born 16 November 1995) is a Romanian professional footballer who plays as a centre-back for Liga I club Voluntari.

== Honours ==
Pandurii Târgu Jiu

- Cupa Ligii runner-up: 2014–15

Astra Giurgiu

- Cupa României runner-up: 2016–17

Apollon Limassol

- Cypriot Cup runner-up: 2017–18

Universitatea Cluj

- Cupa României runner-up: 2022–23
