= Szabolcs Kilyén =

Romanian footballer (born 1998)

Personal information
- Full name: Szabolcs István Kilyén
- Date of birth: 19 March 1998 (age 28)
- Place of birth: Sovata, Romania
- Height: 1.83 m (6 ft 0 in)
- Position: Defender

Team information
- Current team: Bihor Oradea
- Number: 2

Youth career
- –2015: LPS Pitești
- 2015–2017: Gheorghe Hagi Academy

Senior career*
Years	Team	Apps	(Gls)
2015–2020	Viitorul Constanța	0	(0)
2017	→ Sepsi OSK (loan)	0	(0)
2017	→ ASA Târgu Mureș (loan)	14	(0)
2018–2019	→ Mioveni (loan)	29	(0)
2019	→ Sepsi OSK (loan)	10	(0)
2020	→ Dinamo București (loan)	5	(0)
2020–2021	Vasas	1	(0)
2021–2022	Nyíregyháza	5	(0)
2022	→ Odorheiu Secuiesc (loan)	12	(0)
2022–2025	CSU Alba Iulia	64	(7)
2025–2026	Corvinul Hunedoara	7	(1)
2026–	Bihor Oradea	4	(0)

International career
2014–2015	Romania U17	7	(0)
2016	Romania U18	1	(0)
2016	Romania U19	4	(0)
2018	Székely Land		
- * Club domestic league appearances and goals as of 12 September 2026

Szabolcs István Kilyén (born 19 March 1998) is a Romanian professional footballer who plays as a defender for Liga II club Bihor Oradea.

== Club career ==
He spent his youth years at LPS Pitești and the Gheorghe Hagi Academy. He got his first professional contract from Viitorul Constanța at age 18 in 2016. In the four years that he stayed at the club he was mostly loaned to Liga II and Liga I sides. In 2020 he joined Vasas.

== International career ==
At youth level he played for both the Romania under-17 and the Romania under-19 teams.

He was member of the Székely Land squad that finished 4th at the 2018 ConIFA World Football Cup.

== Honours ==
Viitorul Constanța

- Liga I: 2016–17

Odorheiu Secuiesc

- Liga III: 2021–22

Corvinul Hunedoara

- Liga II: 2025–26
