= Marin Anastasovici Stadium =

Football stadium in Giurgiu, Romania

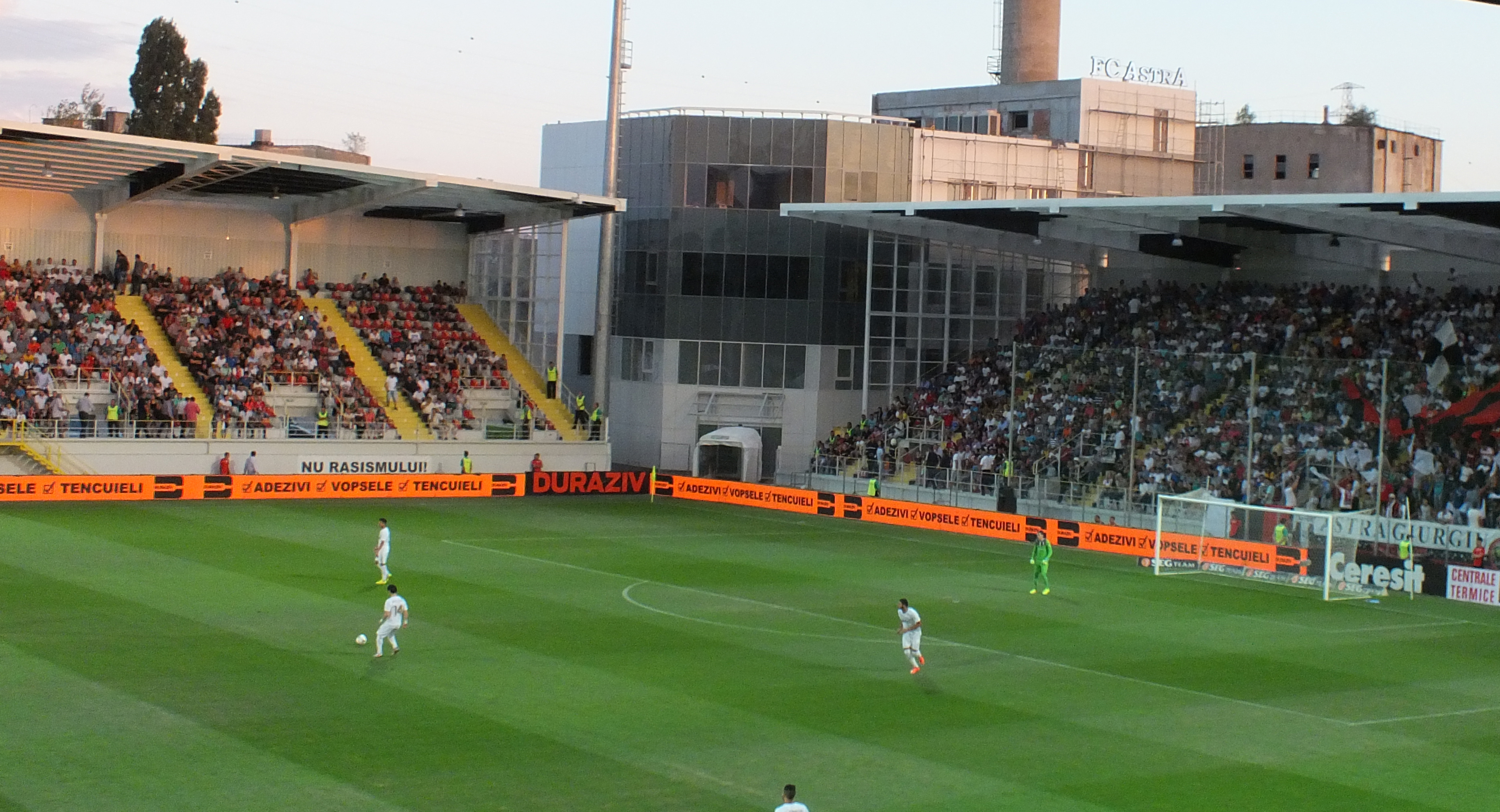
- UEFA
- Interactive map of Marin Anastasovici Stadium
- Address: Strada Păcii, nr. 60
- Location: Giurgiu, Romania
- Coordinates: 43°53′46″N 25°58′53″E
- Owner: Municipality of Giurgiu
- Operator: Dunărea Giurgiu
- Capacity: 8,500
- Surface: Grass
- Field size: 105 x 68m

Construction
- Opened: 1970s
- Renovated: 2012–2014

Tenants
- Dunărea Giurgiu (1970–2012, 2022–present); Astra Giurgiu (2014–2022)

The Marin Anastasovici Stadium is a soccer-specific stadium in Giurgiu, Romania. The stadium was the homeground of Astra Giurgiu until they folded in 2022 and now serves as home ground of Dunărea Giurgiu. It has a seat capacity of 8,500.

== History ==
The stadium was opened in the 1970s and was originally named Olimpia, after the local football team of the time. It was also colloquially known as „Fabrica de zahăr” (literally, “the sugar factory”) because a sugar-processing plant stood across the road from the stadium (now defunct).

Marin Anastasovici served as coach of Olimpia Giurgiu during the 1970s and 1980s, though the stadium was only renamed in his honour in the late 1990s.

Originally the facility featured a concrete main stand and a four-lane athletics track. A smaller metal stand was added in the 1980s.

The local rugby team, Consig Giurgiu, used the stadium for first- and second-division matches until folding in the early 2000s; around that time, the football team relocated to Dunarea stadium.

An initial refurbishment took place in the early 2000s, coinciding with the football team’s return and a period competing in Romania’s second division. During this phase the stands were fitted with modern individual seating, the grandstand was extended to incorporate more exclusive seating in the upper-section, a new locker-room building was erected at the north end of the pitch, and a small hotel for the athletes was also built.

In the early 2010s, Ioan Niculae, owner of Astra Ploiești and a native of Giurgiu County, elected to relocate the team to Giurgiu and invested in major stadium upgrades between 2012 and 2014. The works included construction of a new second stand (functionally becoming the new main stand), a new south-end stand, and a new dedicated building housing locker rooms and club offices, bringing the capacity to its current rating of 8500. As a result, the athletics track was decommissioned, and a new standalone track was built outside the stadium.

The first game for Romania at Giurgiu was a friendly match against Lithuania on 23 March 2016.

The stadium also hosted various UEFA Europa League matches but also a match from the UEFA Champions League qualifying rounds.

Astra Giurgiu celebrated winning its only Liga 1 title here in 2016.

Academica Clinceni also played Liga 1 football here.

Carmen Bucuresti also used the stadium for first division women's football for a few seasons.

== Events ==
=== Association football ===
International football matches
Date	Competition	Home	Away	Score	Attendance
13 November 2015	2017 UEFA Euro U-21 qualification	Romania	Denmark	0 - 3	1,250
23 March 2016	Friendly	Romania	Lithuania	1 - 0	4,368

=== International club football ===
International football clubs matches
Date	Competition	Home	Away	Score	Attendance
31 July 2014	UEFA Europa League	(Romania) Astra Giurgiu	(Czech Republic) Slovan Liberec	3 - 0	4,067
28 August 2014	UEFA Europa League	(Romania) Astra Giurgiu	(France) Olympique Lyonnais	0 - 1	7,200
2 October 2014	UEFA Europa League	(Romania) Astra Giurgiu	(Austria) Salzburg	1 - 2	3,298
6 November 2014	UEFA Europa League	(Romania) Astra Giurgiu	(Scotland) Celtic	1 - 1	3,400
27 November 2014	UEFA Europa League	(Romania) Astra Giurgiu	(Croatia) Dinamo Zagreb	1 - 0	2,520
23 July 2015	UEFA Europa League	(Romania) Astra Giurgiu	(Scotland) Inverness Caledonian Thistle	0 - 0	3,067
6 August 2015	UEFA Europa League	(Romania) Astra Giurgiu	(England) West Ham United	2 - 1	6,300
20 August 2015	UEFA Europa League	(Romania) Astra Giurgiu	(Netherlands) AZ Alkmaar	3 - 2	3,712
27 July 2016	UEFA Champions League	(Romania) Astra Giurgiu	(Denmark) Copenhagen	1 - 1	2,381
18 August 2016	UEFA Europa League	(Romania) Astra Giurgiu	(England) West Ham United	1 - 1	3,360
16 February 2017	UEFA Europa League	(Romania) Astra Giurgiu	(Belgium) Genk	2 - 2	3,775
13 July 2017	UEFA Europa League	(Romania) Astra Giurgiu	(Azerbaijan) Zira	3 - 1	1,730
27 July 2017	UEFA Europa League	(Romania) Astra Giurgiu	(Ukraine) Oleksandriya	0 - 0	1,482
11 July 2019	UEFA Europa League	(Romania) FCSB	(Moldova) Milsami Orhei	2 - 0	4,850
1 August 2019	UEFA Europa League	(Romania) FCSB	(Armenia) Alashkert	2 - 3	1,828
8 August 2019	UEFA Europa League	(Romania) FCSB	(Czech Republic) Mladá Boleslav	0 - 0	2,315
22 August 2019	UEFA Europa League	(Romania) FCSB	(Portugal) Vitória S.C.	0 - 0	4,518

== See also ==
- List of football stadiums in Romania
