= 2018–19 FC Hermannstadt season =

Hermannstadt
2018–19 season
- Chairman: Teodor Birț
- Manager: Alexandru Pelici
- Stadium: Municipal
- Cupa României: Round of 32

The 2018–19 season will be the 4th season of competitive football by Hermannstadt, and their first ever in Liga I. Hermannstadt will compete in the Liga I and in Cupa României.

== Previous season positions ==
	Competition	Position
(Romania)	Liga II	2nd
(Romania)	Cupa României	Runner-ups

== Competitions ==
Win Draw Loss

=== Liga I ===
The Liga I fixture list was announced on 5 July 2018.

==== Regular season ====
===== Table =====
Pos	Team	Pld	W	D	L	GF	GA	GD	Pts	Qualification
8	Politehnica Iași	26	10	4	12	28	38	−10	34	Qualification for the Relegation round
9	Dinamo București	26	8	8	10	29	37	−8	32	Qualification for the Relegation round
10	Hermannstadt	26	9	5	12	25	28	−3	32	Qualification for the Relegation round
11	Gaz Metan Mediaș	26	7	10	9	25	32	−7	31	Qualification for the Relegation round
12	Dunărea Călărași	26	4	12	10	16	25	−9	24	Qualification for the Relegation round

Source: LPF (in Romanian), Soccerway
Rules for classification: 1) Points; 2) Head-to-head points; 3) Head-to-head goal difference; 4) Head-to-head goals scored; 5) Goal difference; 6) Goals scored; 7) Play-off.

===== Results summary =====
Overall								Home						Away					
Pld	W	D	L	GF	GA	GD	Pts	W	D	L	GF	GA	GD	W	D	L	GF	GA	GD
26	9	5	12	25	28	−3	32	5	3	5	14	12	+2	4	2	7	11	16	−5

Last updated: 3 March 2019.
Source: Liga I

===== Results by round =====
Round	1	2	3	4	5	6	7	8	9	10	11	12	13	14	15	16	17	18	19	20	21	22	23	24	25	26	27	28	29	30	31	32	33	34	35	36	37	38
Ground	H	A	H	A	H	A	H	A	H	H	A	H	A	A	H	A	H	A	H	A	H	A	A	H	A	H												
Result	W	L	D	L	W	L	L	L	L	L	D	L	W	W	D	W	W	L	D	W	W	D	L	L	L	W												
Position																																						

Updated to match(es) played on 3 March 2019. Source: Liga I
A = Away; H = Home; W = Win; D = Draw; L = Loss

===== Matches =====
Win Draw Loss

21 July 2018 1	Hermannstadt	1–0	Sepsi Sfântu Gheorghe	Târgu Mureș
18:00 EEST (UTC+3)	Blănaru 11'; I.Antonov (yellow card) 23'; P.Petrescu (yellow card) 90+1'	Report		Stadium: Trans-Sil; Attendance: 400; Referee: Ovidiu Hațegan

27 July 2018 2	FC Botoșani	2–0	Hermannstadt	Botoșani
21:00 EEST (UTC+3)	A.Dumitraș 44'; M.A.Roman (yellow card) 67' (goal) 77'; R.Oaidă (yellow card) 86'	Report	Dandea (yellow card) 51'; A.Coman (yellow card) 86'; D.Tătar (yellow card) 87'	Stadium: Municipal; Attendance: 3,000; Referee: Ionuţ Coza

5 August 2018 3	Hermannstadt	1–1	Dunărea Călărași	Târgu Mureș
18:00 EEST (UTC+3)	Blănaru 24'; I.Antonov (yellow card) 90'	Report	Dobrosavlevici 90+1'	Stadium: Trans-Sil; Attendance: 200; Referee: Iulian Dima

11 August 2018 4	Concordia Chiajna	2–0	Hermannstadt	Chiajna
18:00 EEST (UTC+3)	Batin 38' (pen.); Nivaldo (yellow card) 55'; Caparco (yellow card) 87'; D.Panait 88'	Report	I.Antonov (yellow card) 27'; Chalkiadakis (yellow card) 56'	Stadium: Concordia; Attendance: 200; Referee: Marian Alexandru Barbu

20 August 2018 5	Hermannstadt	4–0	FC Voluntari	Târgu Mureș
18:00 EEST (UTC+3)	D.Tătar (yellow card) 10' (goal) 38'; Mijušković (yellow card) 22'; Tsoumou 29', 34'; C.Pîrvulescu 68'; Dandea (yellow card) 75'	Report	Artabe (yellow card) 39'; Ciucur (yellow card) 50'; Drăghia (red card) 51'	Stadium: Trans-Sil; Attendance: 300; Referee: Horațiu Feșnic (Cluj)

25 August 2018 6	Dinamo București	2–1	Hermannstadt	Bucharest
21:00 EEST (UTC+3)	Salomão 4' (yellow card) 74'; M.Popescu (yellow card) 33'; Hanca (yellow card) 62'; Delorge (yellow card) 76'; Pešić 90+4'	Report	Nkololo 48'; A.Coman (yellow card) 49'; Tsoumou (yellow card) 55' (yellow-red card) 56'; Dandea (yellow card) 83'; Mijušković (yellow card) 84'	Stadium: Dinamo; Attendance: 1,887; Referee: Andrei Chivulete

1 September 2018 7	Hermannstadt	0–1	Gaz Metan Mediaș	Târgu Mureș
16:00 EEST (UTC+3)	A.Coman (yellow card) 18'; P.Petrescu (yellow card) 62'; C.Pîrvulescu (yellow card) 65'	Report	V.Crețu 66'	Stadium: Trans-Sil; Attendance: 500; Referee: Radu Petrescu

17 September 2018 8	Viitorul Constanța	1–0	Hermannstadt	Ovidiu
21:00 EEST (UTC+3)	I.Hagi 29' (pen.); Luchin (yellow card) 78'	Report	Dâlbea (yellow card) 23'; Pamfile (yellow card) 28'	Stadium: Viitorul; Attendance: 1,500; Referee: Marius Avram

22 September 2018 9	Hermannstadt	0–1	CFR Cluj	Târgu Mureș
15:00 EEST (UTC+3)	B.Company (yellow card) 27'; Tsoumou (yellow card) 62'	Report	T.Moutinho (yellow card) 11'; Țucudean (yellow card) 47' (goal) 69'	Stadium: Trans-Sil; Attendance: 100; Referee: Marcel Bîrsan (Bucharest)

30 September 2018 10	Hermannstadt	1–3	FCSB	Târgu Mureș
21:00 EEST (UTC+3)	Dâlbea 25'; I.Antonov (yellow card) 36'; D.Tătar (yellow card) 83'	Report	F.Tănase 41', 66'; R.Benzar (yellow card) 50'; Gnohéré 57' (yellow card) 76'	Stadium: Trans-Sil; Attendance: 2,000; Referee: George Rădulescu

6 October 2018 11	Universitatea Craiova	1–1	Hermannstadt	Craiova
18:00 EEST (UTC+3)	Cicâldău (yellow card) 27'; Koljić 45+2' (pen.); Donkor (yellow card) 90+2'	Report	Blănaru 7'; Dandea (yellow card) 40'; D.Tătar (yellow card) 45+1'; Căbuz (yellow card) 90+3'	Stadium: Ion Oblemenco; Attendance: 12,000; Referee: Iulian Călin

20 October 2018 12	Hermannstadt	0–2	Astra Giurgiu	Târgu Mureș
16:00 EEST (UTC+3)	Pamfile (yellow card) 30'; Mijušković (yellow card) 79'	Report	Llullaku 60' (pen.); Erico 74'; Alibec (yellow card) 86'	Stadium: Trans-Sil; Attendance: 100; Referee: Radu Petrescu

26 October 2018 13	Politehnica Iași	0–2	Hermannstadt	Iași
18:00 EEST (UTC+3)	Platini (yellow card) 84'	Report	Tsoumou 23'; Serediuc (yellow card) 32'; L.M.Dumitriu 38'; Mijušković (yellow card) 69'; Dâlbea (yellow card) 73'	Stadium: Emil Alexandrescu; Attendance: 1,000; Referee: István Kovács (Carei)

3 November 2018 14	Sepsi Sfântu Gheorghe	1–3	Hermannstadt	Sfântu Gheorghe
18:00 EET (UTC+2)	Tandia 42'; F.Ștefan (yellow card) 48'; O.Viera (yellow card) 69'	Report	L.M.Dumitriu 46'; Tsoumou 56'; B.Company (yellow card) 59'; I.Stoica (yellow card) 64'; Dâlbea 70' (pen.); C.Pîrvulescu (yellow card) 74'	Stadium: Municipal; Attendance: 2,500; Referee: Marian Alexandru Barbu

12 November 2018 15	Hermannstadt	1–1	FC Botoșani	Târgu Mureș
14:00 EET (UTC+2)	Serediuc (yellow card) 38'; Mijušković (yellow card) 65'; D.Tătar 77'; Dandea (yellow card) 81'; Tsoumou (yellow card) 90+3'	Report	J.Rodríguez 63' (pen.) (yellow card) 75'; M.A.Roman (yellow card) 67'	Stadium: Trans-Sil; Attendance: 200; Referee: Andrei Chivulete

25 November 2018 16	Dunărea Călărași	0–1	Hermannstadt	Călărași
13:30 EET (UTC+2)	G.Mendy (yellow card) 31'; Dobrosavlevici (yellow card) 45+5'	Report	C.Pîrvulescu (yellow card) 29'; Dâlbea (yellow card) 53'; L.M.Dumitriu (yellow card) 67' (goal) 90+4'	Stadium: Ion Comșa; Attendance: 1,500; Referee: Adrian Viorel Cojocaru

1 December 2018 17	Hermannstadt	2–1	Concordia Chiajna	Târgu Mureș
14:00 EET (UTC+2)	P.Petrescu 4'; Dandea 28'	Report	Batin 45' (pen.); Ropotan (yellow card) 51'; A.Marc (yellow card) 79'	Stadium: Trans-Sil; Attendance: 100; Referee: Lucian Ruşandu

4 December 2018 18	FC Voluntari	2–0	Hermannstadt	Voluntari
17:30 EET (UTC+2)	Gadze 52', 65'	Report	Dandea (yellow card) 58'; Acsinte (yellow card) 60'; P.Petrescu (yellow card) 77'	Stadium: Anghel Iordănescu; Attendance: 150; Referee: Horia Gabriel Mladinovici

8 December 2018 19	Hermannstadt	1–1	Dinamo București	Târgu Mureș
17:00 EET (UTC+2)	P.Petrescu 32'	Report	Hanca 9'; Rachid (yellow card) 89'	Stadium: Trans-Sil; Attendance: 150; Referee: István Kovács (Carei)

15 December 2018 20	Gaz Metan Mediaș	0–2	Hermannstadt	Mediaș
17:00 EET (UTC+2)	L.Aurélio (yellow card) 39'; V.Crețu (yellow card) 55'; I.Cristea (yellow card) 66'	Report	D.Tătar 30' (yellow card) 85'; Dâlbea (yellow card) 41'; I.Stoica 49'	Stadium: Gaz Metan; Attendance: 1,000; Referee: George Cătălin Găman

22 December 2018 21	Hermannstadt	1–0	Viitorul Constanța	Cluj-Napoca
13:00 EET (UTC+2)	L.M.Dumitriu 12'; Căbuz (yellow card) 90+2'	Report	D.Drăguș (yellow card) 90+3'	Stadium: Dr. Constantin Rădulescu; Attendance: 500; Referee: Andrei Chivulete

2 February 2019 22	CFR Cluj	1–1	Hermannstadt	Cluj-Napoca
EET (UTC+2)				Stadium: Dr. Constantin Rădulescu

9 February 2019 23	FCSB	3–0	Hermannstadt	Bucharest
EET (UTC+2)				Stadium: Arena Națională

16 February 2019 24	Hermannstadt	0–1	Universitatea Craiova	Sibiu
EET (UTC+2)				Stadium: Municipal

23 February 2019 25	Astra Giurgiu	1-0	Hermannstadt	Giurgiu
17:00 EET (UTC+2)	Butean 49'; Biceanu (yellow card) 90+1'	Report	Mățel (yellow card) 28'; Mijušković (yellow card) 34'	Stadium: Marin Anastasovici; Attendance: 1,000; Referee: Andrei Chivulete

3 March 2019 26	Hermannstadt	2-0	Politehnica Iași	Sibiu
EET (UTC+2)	Dâlbea (yellow card) 10'; Mățel (yellow card) 33'; Petrescu (yellow card) 67'; Popovici 71'; Dandea (yellow card) 82'; Jazvić 90'	Report	Qaka (yellow card) 64'; Mihalache (red card) 88'; Sin (yellow card) 90+4'	Stadium: Municipal; Attendance: 300; Referee: Marius Avram

==== Relegation round ====
===== Table =====
Pos	Team	Pld	W	D	L	GF	GA	GD	Pts	Qualification or relegation
7	Gaz Metan Mediaș	14	10	2	2	25	9	+16	48	
8	Botoșani	14	8	2	4	18	9	+9	44	
9	Dinamo București	14	8	3	3	16	7	+9	43	
10	Politehnica Iași	14	3	5	6	12	18	−6	31	
11	Voluntari	14	5	5	4	14	16	−2	31	
12	Hermannstadt (O)	14	2	5	7	9	19	−10	27	Qualification for the relegation play-offs
13	Dunărea Călărași (R)	14	3	4	7	8	18	−10	25	Relegation to Liga II
14	Concordia Chiajna (R)	14	2	4	8	17	23	−6	19	Relegation to Liga II

Source: Soccerway
Rules for classification: 1) Points; 2) Points without rounding; 3) Head-to-head points; 4) Head-to-head goal difference; 5) Head-to-head goals scored; 6) Goal difference; 7) Goals scored; 8) Play-off (only if needed to decide teams for relegation). (Note: only criteria 6 and 7 are applied to establish the classification during the competition.)
(O) Play-off winners; (R) Relegated

===== Results summary =====
Overall								Home						Away					
Pld	W	D	L	GF	GA	GD	Pts	W	D	L	GF	GA	GD	W	D	L	GF	GA	GD
14	2	5	7	9	19	−10	11	2	2	3	4	7	−3	0	3	4	5	12	−7

Last updated: 2 June 2019.
Source: Liga I

===== Position by round =====
Round	1	2	3	4	5	6	7	8	9	10	11	12	13	14
Ground	H	A	A	H	A	H	A	A	H	H	A	H	A	H
Result	L	D	L	L	L	D	D	L	W	D	D	L	L	W
Position	11	12	12	12	12	12	12	13	12	12	12	13	13	12

Updated to match(es) played on 2 June 2019. Source: Liga I
A = Away; H = Home; W = Win; D = Draw; L = Loss

===== Matches =====
Win Draw Loss

9 March 2019 1	Hermannstadt	0–2	Gaz Metan Mediaș	Sibiu
	Dâlbea (yellow card) 16' (yellow-red card) 44'; Pârvulescu (yellow card) 39'; Mijušković (yellow card) 58'; Dandea (red card) 83'; Tătar (yellow card) 84'; Blănaru (yellow card) 90+3'	Report	Larie 6'; Bușu (yellow card) 18'; Fofana (yellow card) 27'; Mailat (yellow card) 84'; Rondón 90+1' (pen.)	Stadium: Municipal; Attendance: 500; Referee: George Găman

18 March 2019 2	Concordia Chiajna	2–2	Hermannstadt	Chiajna
	Gorobsov 16'; Tha'er Bawab 18'; Cadamuro (yellow card) 24'; Alexe (yellow card) 51'; Ropotan (yellow card) 54'	Report	Tsoumou 4'; Jazvić 12'; Pârvulescu (yellow card) 30'; Offenbacher (yellow card) 50'; Stoica (yellow card) 57'	Stadium: Concordia; Attendance: 400; Referee: Robert Dumitru

29 March 2019 3	Dinamo București	2–0	Hermannstadt	Bucharest
	Nistor (yellow card) 7'; Montini 12'; Klimavičius 16'; Sorescu (yellow card) 38'; Dussaut (yellow card) 70'	Report	Pârvulescu (yellow card) 23'; Offenbacher (yellow card) 49'	Stadium: Dinamo; Attendance: 1,011; Referee: Catalin Popa

6 April 2019 4	Hermannstadt	0–1	Politehnica Iași	Pitești
	Offenbacher (yellow card) 39'; Pârvulescu (yellow card) 86'; Mățel (yellow card) 90+2'	Report	João Teixeira (yellow card) 41' (goal) 56' (pen.)	Stadium: Stadionul Nicolae Dobrin; Attendance: 50; Referee: Iulian Dima

13 April 2019 5	Botoșani	1–0	Hermannstadt	Botoșani
	Roman (yellow card) 90'; Fabbrini 90+3'	Report	Dandea (yellow card) 7'; Stoica (yellow card) 39'; Dâlbea (yellow card) 65'; Tătar (yellow card) 68'	Stadium: Municipal; Attendance: 2,000; Referee: Serbastian Colțescu

19 April 2019 6	Hermannstadt	1–1	Voluntari	Pitești
	Lendrić 24'; Serediuc (yellow card) 61'; Stoica (yellow card) 77'	Report	Răuță (yellow card) 4'; Ricardinho 41'; Popadiuc (yellow card) 90+3'	Stadium: Stadionul Nicolae Dobrin; Attendance: 100; Referee: Horaiu Fesnic

27 April 2019 7	Dunărea Călărași	0–0	Hermannstadt	Călărași
	Filip (yellow card) 20'	Report	Petrescu (yellow card) 65'	Stadium: Ion Comșa; Attendance: 1,700; Referee: Ovidiu Hațegan

3 May 2019 8	Gaz Metan Mediaș	4–1	Hermannstadt	Mediaș
	Rondón 25' 67' (pen.) 73'; David Caiado 70'; Crețu (yellow card) 88'	Report	Dâlbea (yellow card) 48' (goal) 89' (pen.); Mijušković (yellow card) 67'; Tătar (yellow card) 69'; Dandea (yellow card) 78'; Jazvić (yellow card) 82'	Stadium: Gaz Metan; Attendance: 2,000; Referee: George Rădulescu

11 May 2019 9	Hermannstadt	1–0	Concordia Chiajna	Sibiu
	Blănaru 33'; Serediuc (yellow card) 65'; Jazvić (yellow card) 67'; Tătar (yellow card) 80'; Acsinte (yellow card) 90+1' (yellow-red card) 90+1'	Report	Ropotan (yellow card) 19'; Marc (yellow card) 60'; Radu (yellow card) 85'; Cristescu (yellow card) 90+4'	Stadium: Municipal; Attendance: 4,000; Referee: István Kovács (referee)

15 May 2019 10	Hermannstadt	0–0	Dinamo București	Sibiu
	Blănaru (yellow card) 57'; Dâlbea (yellow card) 69'	Report	Montini (yellow card) 49'; Sorescu (yellow card) 90+1'	Stadium: Municipal; Attendance: 4,500; Referee: Marius Avram

18 May 2019 11	Politehnica Iași	1–1	Hermannstadt	Iași
	Filipe Nascimento 64' (pen.); Sin (yellow card) 90+6'	Report	Mijušković (yellow card) 62'; Tătar (yellow card) 73'; Dumitriu (yellow card) 82'; Stoica 86'; Tsoumou (yellow card) 86'	Stadium: Emil Alexandrescu; Attendance: 300; Referee: Andrei Chivulete

21 May 2019 12	Hermannstadt	0–2	Botoșani	Sibiu
	Tsoumou (yellow card) 23'	Report	Rodríguez (yellow card) 69'; Oaidă (yellow card) 80' (yellow-red card) 81'; Roman 85'; Golofca 90+3'	Stadium: Municipal; Attendance: 4,500; Referee: George Găman

27 May 2019 13	Voluntari	2–1	Hermannstadt	Voluntari
	Deac 17'; Vlad (yellow card) 54'; Popadiuc 82'; Laïdouni (yellow card) 82'; Răuță (yellow card) 89'; Mitrev (yellow card) 90'; Căpățînă (yellow card) 90+1'	Report	Offenbacher (yellow card) 21' (red card) 50'; Jazvić (yellow card) 31'; Tsoumou 76'	Stadium: Anghel Iordănescu; Attendance: 1,500; Referee: István Kovács (referee)

2 June 2019 14	Hermannstadt	2–1	Dunărea Călărași	Sibiu
	Tsoumou 85'; Blănaru (red card) 90+2'; Lendrić 90+6'; Popovici (yellow card) 90+8'	Report	Enache (yellow card) 53'; Gligorov (yellow card) 57'; Bourceanu (yellow card) 58'; Filip 77' (yellow card) 90+2'; Honciu (yellow card) 81'; Dobrosavlevici (yellow card) 82'	Stadium: Municipal; Attendance: 4,500; Referee: (Romania) Ovidiu Hațegan

=== Cupa României ===
26 September 2018 Round of 32	FC Academica Clinceni	0–2	Hermannstadt	Clinceni
				Stadium: Stadionul Clinceni

30 October 2018 Round of 16	Hermannstadt	3–0	FC Voluntari	Târgu Mureș
				Stadium: Trans-Sil

26 February 2019 Quarter-final	Hermannstadt	2–3	Viitorul Constanța	Sibiu
				Stadium: Municipal

== See also ==
- 2018–19 Cupa României
- 2018–19 Liga I
