= 2018–19 Liga I =

101st season of top-tier football league in Romania

Liga I
- Season: 2018–19
- Champions: CFR Cluj; 5th title
- Relegated: Concordia Chiajna; Dunărea Călărași
- Champions League: CFR Cluj
- Europa League: FCSB; Viitorul Constanța; Universitatea Craiova
- Matches: 268
- Goals: 624 (2.33 per match)
- Top goalscorer: George Țucudean (18 goals)
- Best goalkeeper: Giedrius Arlauskis (18 clean sheets)
- Biggest home win: CFR Cluj 5–0 Voluntari (30 November 2018)
- Biggest away win: Voluntari 1–5 Universitatea Craiova (27 August 2018); Botoșani 1–5 CFR Cluj (3 November 2018); Astra Giurgiu 1–5 CFR Cluj (6 May 2019); Sepsi OSK 1–5 FCSB (11 May 2019)
- Highest scoring: Concordia Chiajna 3–6 Politehnica Iași (14 December 2018)
- Longest winning run: 6 matches Botoșani
- Longest unbeaten run: 15 matches CFR Cluj
- Longest winless run: 19 matches Concordia Chiajna
- Longest losing run: 8 matches Concordia Chiajna
- Highest attendance: 30,000; Universitatea Craiova 2–1 FCSB (21 October 2018)
- Lowest attendance: 50; Concordia Chiajna 3–6 Politehnica Iași (14 December 2018); Voluntari 1–1 Astra Giurgiu (15 December 2018); Hermannstadt 0–1 Politehnica Iași (6 April 2018); Concordia Chiajna 4–1 Politehnica Iași (26 May 2019)
- Total attendance: 923,723
- Average attendance: 3,447
- All statistics correct as of 2 June 2019.

The 2018–19 Liga I (also known as Liga 1 Betano for sponsorship reasons) was the 101st season of the Liga I, the top professional league for Romanian association football clubs. The season began on 20 July 2018 and ended on 2 June 2019, being the fourth to take place since the play-off/play-out rule has been introduced.

Dunărea Călărași and Hermannstadt joined as the promoted clubs from the 2017–18 Liga II. CFR Cluj managed to defend the title for the first time in their history, while FCSB became the first team in the country to finish as runners-up for four consecutive seasons.

== Teams ==
The league consists of 14 teams: twelve teams from the 2017–18 Liga I and two new teams from the 2017–18 Liga II.

Teams promoted to the Liga I

The first club to be promoted was Dunărea Călărași, following their 3–1 win against Ripensia Timișoara on 5 May 2018. Dunărea will play in the Liga I for the first time in their history.

The second club to be promoted was Hermannstadt, following their 1–1 draw against Chindia Târgoviște on 13 May 2018. Hermannstadt will play in the Liga I for the first time in their history, but the city of Sibiu, which had many different teams over time, returned in the Liga I after six years of absence, where was last time represented by Voința Sibiu.

Teams relegated to the Liga II

The first club to be relegated was Juventus București, which were relegated on 22 May 2018 following a 1–3 defeat against Concordia Chiajna, ending their 1-year stay in the top flight.

The second club to be relegated was Poli Timișoara, which were relegated on 2 June 2018 following their 1–0 win against Concordia Chiajna, ending their 3-year stay in the top flight.

=== Venues ===
FCSB	Universitatea Craiova	CFR Cluj	Dinamo București
Arena Națională	Ion Oblemenco	Dr. Constantin Rădulescu	Dinamo
Capacity: 55,634	Capacity: 30,929	Capacity: 23,500	Capacity: 15,032
Politehnica Iași	2018–19 Liga I (Romania) Location of Bucharest teams.		Dunărea Călărași
Emil Alexandrescu	2018–19 Liga I (Romania) Location of Bucharest teams.		Ion Comșa
Capacity: 11,390	2018–19 Liga I (Romania) Location of Bucharest teams.		Capacity: 10,400
Astra Giurgiu	2018–19 Liga I (Romania) Location of Bucharest teams.		Gaz Metan Mediaș
Marin Anastasovici	2018–19 Liga I (Romania) Location of Bucharest teams.		Gaz Metan
Capacity: 8,500	2018–19 Liga I (Romania) Location of Bucharest teams.		Capacity: 7,814
FC Botoșani	2018–19 Liga I (Romania) Location of Bucharest teams.		Sepsi OSK
Municipal	2018–19 Liga I (Romania) Location of Bucharest teams.		Municipal
Capacity: 7,782	2018–19 Liga I (Romania) Location of Bucharest teams.		Capacity: 5,200
Concordia Chiajna	Hermannstadt (Note: Hermannstadt was relocated to Trans-Sil Stadium in Târgu Mureș between round 1 and round 24 and to Nicolae Dobrin Stadium in Pitești between round 24 and round 8 of the play-out, because Municipal Stadium in Sibiu was under renovations.)	Voluntari	Viitorul Constanța
Concordia	Municipal	Anghel Iordănescu	Viitorul
Capacity: 5,123	Capacity: 5,000	Capacity: 4,600	Capacity: 4,554

=== Personnel and kits ===
Note: Flags indicate national team as has been defined under FIFA eligibility rules. Players and Managers may hold more than one non-FIFA nationality.

Team	Manager	Captain	Kit manufacturer	Shirt sponsor
Astra Giurgiu	(Romania) Costel Enache	(Croatia) Filip Mrzljak	Joma	—
Botoșani	(Romania) Liviu Ciobotariu	(Romania) Andrei Burcă	Erreà	Casa Pariurilor
CFR Cluj	(Romania) Dan Petrescu	(Portugal) Mário Camora	Joma	NTT Data
Concordia Chiajna	(Romania) Adrian Falub	(Romania) Marian Cristescu	Lotto	—
Dinamo București	(Romania) Mircea Rednic	(Romania) Dan Nistor	Macron	Orange
Dunărea Călărași	(Romania) Dan Alexa	(Romania) Alin Dobrosavlevici	Acerbis	Fortuna
FCSB	(Romania) Mihai Teja	(Romania) Mihai Pintilii	Nike	City Insurance
Gaz Metan Mediaș	(Romania) Edward Iordănescu	(Romania) Marius Constantin	Joma	Romgaz
Hermannstadt	(Hungary) Vasile Miriuță	(Romania) Răzvan Dâlbea	Andu	Primăria Sibiu
Politehnica Iași	(Romania) Flavius Stoican	(Romania) Cosmin Frăsinescu	Joma	Superbet
Sepsi OSK	(Romania) Marin Barbu	(Romania) Attila Hadnagy	Adidas	Diószegi, Gyermelyi
Universitatea Craiova	(Romania) Corneliu Papură	(Romania) Nicușor Bancu	Joma	Betano.com
Viitorul Constanța	(Romania) Gheorghe Hagi	(Romania) Ianis Hagi	Nike	—
Voluntari	(Italy) Cristiano Bergodi	(Romania) Cosmin Vâtcă	Macron	Winner

=== Managerial changes ===
Team	Outgoing manager	Manner of departure	Date of vacancy	Position in table	Incoming manager	Date of appointment
Astra	(Romania) Gheorghe Mulțescu	End of contract	31 May 2018	Pre-season	(Romania) Marius Măldărășanu	10 June 2018
CFR Cluj	(Romania) Dan Petrescu	Signed by Guizhou Hengfeng	4 June 2018	Pre-season	(Romania) Edward Iordănescu	13 June 2018
Voluntari	(Romania) Adrian Mutu	Sacked	14 June 2018	Pre-season	(Romania) Daniel Oprița	21 June 2018
Gaz Metan	(Romania) Cristian Pustai	End of contract	30 June 2018	Pre-season	(Romania) Mihai Teja	1 July 2018
CFR Cluj	(Romania) Edward Iordănescu	Mutual agreement	26 July 2018	8	(Portugal) Toni Conceição	26 July 2018
Voluntari	(Romania) Daniel Oprița	Resigned	21 August 2018	14	(Romania) Dinu Todoran	25 August 2018
Astra	(Romania) Marius Măldărășanu	Sacked	2 September 2018	4	(Romania) Gheorghe Mulțescu	2 September 2018
Concordia	(Romania) Ionuț Badea	Mutual agreement	15 September 2018	13	(Romania) Dorinel Munteanu	17 September 2018
Dinamo	(Romania) Florin Bratu	Mutual agreement	22 September 2018	10	(Romania) Claudiu Niculescu	24 September 2018
Hermannstadt	(Romania) Alexandru Pelici	Mutual agreement	9 October 2018	13	(Hungary) Vasile Miriuță	9 October 2018
Dinamo	(Romania) Claudiu Niculescu	Mutual agreement	13 October 2018	12	(Romania) Mircea Rednic	13 October 2018
Voluntari	(Romania) Dinu Todoran	Mutual agreement	7 November 2018	14	(Italy) Cristiano Bergodi	8 November 2018
Astra	(Romania) Gheorghe Mulțescu	Sacked	10 November 2018	6	(Romania) Costel Enache	17 November 2018
Botoșani	(Romania) Costel Enache	Mutual agreement	16 November 2018	12	(Romania) Liviu Ciobotariu	16 November 2018
FCSB	(Romania) Nicolae Dică	Mutual agreement	23 December 2018	2	(Romania) Mihai Teja	27 December 2018
Gaz Metan	(Romania) Mihai Teja	Signed by FCSB	27 December 2018	8	(Romania) Edward Iordănescu	7 January 2019
Concordia	(Romania) Dorinel Munteanu	Sacked	7 January 2019	13	(Romania) Adrian Falub	8 January 2019
CFR Cluj	(Portugal) Toni Conceição	Mutual agreement	19 February 2019	1	(Romania) Alin Minteuan (caretaker)	19 February 2019
CFR Cluj	(Romania) Alin Minteuan (caretaker)	End of tenure as a caretaker	22 March 2019	1	(Romania) Dan Petrescu	22 March 2019
Universitatea	(Italy) Devis Mangia	Mutual agreement	15 April 2019	3	(Romania) Corneliu Papură	22 March 2019
Sepsi	(Romania) Eugen Neagoe	Mutual agreement	2 May 2019	6	(Romania) Marin Barbu (caretaker)	3 May 2019

== Regular season ==
In the regular season the 14 teams will meet twice, a total of 26 matches per team, with the top 6 advancing to the Championship round and the bottom 8 qualifying for Relegation round.

=== Table ===
Pos	Team	Pld	W	D	L	GF	GA	GD	Pts	Qualification
1	CFR Cluj	26	15	9	2	39	16	+23	54	Qualification for the Championship round
2	FCSB	26	14	7	5	49	29	+20	49	Qualification for the Championship round
3	Universitatea Craiova	26	13	6	7	43	24	+19	45	Qualification for the Championship round
4	Astra Giurgiu	26	11	9	6	36	23	+13	42	Qualification for the Championship round
5	Viitorul Constanța	26	11	5	10	26	27	−1	38	Qualification for the Championship round
6	Sepsi OSK	26	10	7	9	32	25	+7	37	Qualification for the Championship round
7	Botoșani	26	9	9	8	31	33	−2	36	Qualification for the Relegation round
8	Politehnica Iași	26	10	4	12	28	38	−10	34	Qualification for the Relegation round
9	Dinamo București	26	8	8	10	29	37	−8	32	Qualification for the Relegation round
10	Hermannstadt	26	9	5	12	25	28	−3	32	Qualification for the Relegation round
11	Gaz Metan Mediaș	26	7	10	9	25	32	−7	31	Qualification for the Relegation round
12	Dunărea Călărași	26	4	12	10	16	25	−9	24	Qualification for the Relegation round
13	Voluntari	26	4	9	13	30	46	−16	21	Qualification for the Relegation round
14	Concordia Chiajna	26	4	6	16	19	45	−26	18	Qualification for the Relegation round

Source: LPF (in Romanian), Soccerway
Rules for classification: 1) Points; 2) Head-to-head points; 3) Head-to-head goal difference; 4) Head-to-head goals scored; 5) Goal difference; 6) Goals scored; 7) Play-off.

=== Results ===
Home \ Away	AST	BOT	CFR	CON	DIN	DUN	FCS	GAZ	HER	IAS	SPS	UCV	VII	VOL
Astra Giurgiu		1–1	1–2	3–1	4–1	1–1	1–0	3–0	1–0	1–2	1–1	0–3	3–0	0–0
Botoșani	1–1		1–5	0–2	2–0	1–0	1–3	1–1	2–0	1–2	0–0	2–1	1–2	1–0
CFR Cluj	1–1	1–1		2–1	3–1	0–0	1–1	2–2	1–1	1–0	1–0	0–0	1–2	5–0
Concordia Chiajna	0–3	0–1	0–1		0–0	1–1	0–0	0–0	2–0	3–6	0–3	1–3	1–1	1–3
Dinamo București	1–2	1–2	0–3	2–1		1–1	1–1	1–1	2–1	3–0	0–0	3–0	1–0	2–1
Dunărea Călărași	1–2	3–2	0–0	2–1	0–0		1–1	0–0	0–1	2–0	0–3	1–3	0–1	1–1
FCSB	1–0	2–2	0–2	0–1	3–3	2–0		2–1	3–0	4–0	2–0	3–2	2–0	2–1
Gaz Metan Mediaș	1–1	1–2	0–0	2–1	3–2	0–0	1–3		0–2	1–0	0–1	3–2	2–2	2–0
Hermannstadt	0–2	1–1	0–1	2–1	1–1	1–1	1–3	0–1		2–0	1–0	0–1	1–0	4–0
Politehnica Iași	1–1	2–1	0–1	3–0	1–0	1–0	1–2	1–0	0–2		1–1	0–3	1–2	2–2
Sepsi OSK	1–0	0–1	1–2	3–0	0–1	1–0	4–2	1–2	1–3	3–0		1–0	0–0	1–1
Universitatea Craiova	1–2	2–2	2–0	0–1	3–0	1–0	2–1	2–0	1–1	0–0	1–1		2–0	3–1
Viitorul Constanța	1–0	1–0	0–1	0–0	4–1	0–1	1–4	2–0	1–0	0–1	2–3	0–0		2–0
Voluntari	1–1	1–1	1–2	4–0	0–1	0–0	2–2	1–1	2–0	2–3	4–2	1–5	1–2	

Source: LPF (in Romanian)
Legend: Blue = home team win; Yellow = draw; Red = away team win.
For upcoming matches, an "a" indicates there is an article about the rivalry between the two participants.

=== Positions by round ===
Team ╲ Round	1	2	3	4	5	6	7	8	9	10	11	12	13	14	15	16	17	18	19	20	21	22	23	24	25	26
Astra Giurgiu	3	4	3	7	6	3	4	2	2	2	5	3	6	6	6	7	7	7	6	6	6	6	4	4	4	4
Botoșani	6	1	2	6	10	9	10	11	12	12	11	8	9	11	12	8	9	10	9	10	10	8	7	6	6	7
CFR Cluj	6	8	4	1	1	2	2	5	3	3	2	1	1	1	1	1	1	1	1	1	1	1	1	1	1	1
Concordia Chiajna	10	11	13	10	4	12	13	13	11	11	10	11	10	10	10	12	13	13	13	13	13	13	13	13	14	14
Dinamo București	1	2	8	4	8	4	8	10	10	10	12	12	12	9	9	10	10	11	11	11	11	11	11	11	11	9
Dunărea Călărași	3	5	4	9	11	5	9	7	9	9	8	9	8	8	8	11	12	12	12	12	12	12	12	12	12	12
FCSB	12	10	6	2	2	1	1	1	1	1	1	2	2	2	2	2	2	2	2	2	2	2	2	3	2	2
Gaz Metan Mediaș	1	3	1	5	9	8	6	4	6	4	3	4	5	5	5	5	5	6	5	7	8	9	10	10	9	11
Hermannstadt	3	7	10	12	4	10	12	12	13	13	13	13	13	12	13	9	8	8	10	9	7	7	9	9	10	10
Politehnica Iași	8	8	12	13	13	13	11	9	7	8	9	10	11	13	11	13	11	9	8	8	9	10	8	8	8	8
Sepsi OSK	12	6	9	3	6	7	5	3	4	5	7	6	7	7	7	6	6	5	7	5	4	5	6	5	5	6
Univ. Craiova	8	14	11	8	12	6	3	8	5	7	6	5	3	3	3	4	4	4	3	3	3	3	3	2	3	3
Viitorul Constanța	12	13	7	11	3	11	7	6	8	6	4	7	4	4	4	3	3	3	4	4	5	4	5	7	7	5
Voluntari	10	11	14	14	14	14	14	14	14	14	14	14	14	14	14	14	14	14	14	14	14	14	14	14	13	13

== Championship play-offs ==
The top six teams from Regular season will meet twice (10 matches per team) for places in 2019–20 UEFA Champions League and 2019–20 UEFA Europa League as well as deciding the league champion. Teams start the Championship round with their points from the Regular season halved, rounded upwards, and no other records carried over from the Regular season.

=== Table ===
Pos	Team	Pld	W	D	L	GF	GA	GD	Pts	Qualification
1	CFR Cluj (C)	10	7	2	1	15	4	+11	50	Qualification to Champions League first qualifying round
2	FCSB	10	7	2	1	18	6	+12	48	Qualification to Europa League first qualifying round
3	Viitorul Constanța	10	6	2	2	18	10	+8	39	Qualification to Europa League second qualifying round
4	Universitatea Craiova	10	4	1	5	8	10	−2	36	Qualification to Europa League first qualifying round
5	Astra Giurgiu	10	2	0	8	6	20	−14	27	
6	Sepsi OSK	10	0	1	9	5	20	−15	20	

Source: Soccerway, Romanian Football Federation
Rules for classification: 1) Points; 2) Points without rounding; 3) Head-to-head points; 4) Head-to-head goal difference; 5) Head-to-head goals scored; 6) Goal difference; 7) Goals scored; 8) Play-off (only if needed to decide champion or teams for UEFA competitions). (Note: only criteria 6 and 7 are applied to establish the classification during the competition.)
(C) Champions

=== Results ===
Home \ Away	AST	CFR	FCS	SPS	UCV	VII
Astra Giurgiu		1–5	0–2	3–2	0–1	1–4
CFR Cluj	1–0		0–0	3–1	1–0	3–1
FCSB	1–0	1–0		2–0	3–2	1–2
Sepsi OSK	0–1	0–1	1–5		0–1	0–0
Universitatea Craiova	1–0	0–0	0–2	1–0		1–2
Viitorul Constanța	3–0	0–1	1–1	3–1	2–1	

Source: Liga 1
Legend: Blue = home team win; Yellow = draw; Red = away team win.

=== Positions by round ===
Team ╲ Round	1	2	3	4	5	6	7	8	9	10
Astra Giurgiu	5	5	5	5	5	5	5	5	5	5
CFR Cluj	1	1	1	1	1	1	1	1	1	1
FCSB	3	3	2	2	2	2	2	2	2	2
Sepsi OSK	6	6	6	6	6	6	6	6	6	6
Universitatea Craiova	2	2	3	3	3	3	3	3	4	4
Viitorul Constanța	4	4	4	4	4	4	4	4	3	3

== Relegation play-outs ==
The bottom eight teams from regular season met twice (14 matches per team) to contest against relegation. Teams started the Relegation round with their points from the Regular season halved, rounded upwards, and no other records carried over from the Regular season. The winner of the Relegation round finished 7th in the overall season standings, the second placed team – 8th, and so on, with the last placed team in the Relegation round being 14th.

=== Table ===
Pos	Team	Pld	W	D	L	GF	GA	GD	Pts	Qualification or relegation
7	Gaz Metan Mediaș	14	10	2	2	25	9	+16	48	
8	Botoșani	14	8	2	4	18	9	+9	44	
9	Dinamo București	14	8	3	3	16	7	+9	43	
10	Politehnica Iași	14	3	5	6	12	18	−6	31	
11	Voluntari	14	5	5	4	14	16	−2	31	
12	Hermannstadt (O)	14	2	5	7	9	19	−10	27	Qualification for the relegation play-offs
13	Dunărea Călărași (R)	14	3	4	7	8	18	−10	25	Relegation to Liga II
14	Concordia Chiajna (R)	14	2	4	8	17	23	−6	19	Relegation to Liga II

Source: Soccerway
Rules for classification: 1) Points; 2) Points without rounding; 3) Head-to-head points; 4) Head-to-head goal difference; 5) Head-to-head goals scored; 6) Goal difference; 7) Goals scored; 8) Play-off (only if needed to decide teams for relegation). (Note: only criteria 6 and 7 are applied to establish the classification during the competition.)
(O) Play-off winners; (R) Relegated

=== Results ===
Home \ Away	BOT	CON	DIN	DUN	GAZ	HER	IAS	VOL
Botoșani		0–0	1–0	1–2	1–0	1–0	3–0	2–0
Concordia Chiajna	2–2		0–2	3–0	0–2	2–2	4–1	1–2
Dinamo București	1–0	3–2		2–0	2–0	2–0	0–0	0–0
Dunărea Călărași	0–2	2–0	1–0		0–1	0–0	1–2	1–1
Gaz Metan Mediaș	2–0	3–1	2–1	0–0		4–1	1–1	4–0
Hermannstadt	0–2	1–0	0–0	2–1	0–2		0–1	1–1
Politehnica Iași	0–2	1–1	0–1	4–0	1–2	1–1		0–2
Voluntari	2–1	2–1	1–2	0–0	1–2	2–1	0–0	

Source: Liga 1
Legend: Blue = home team win; Yellow = draw; Red = away team win.

=== Positions by round ===
Team ╲ Round	1	2	3	4	5	6	7	8	9	10	11	12	13	14
Botoșani	9	10	11	11	10	11	9	9	9	9	9	9	9	8
Concordia Chiajna	14	14	14	14	14	14	14	14	14	14	14	14	14	14
Dinamo București	7	9	8	8	8	8	8	8	8	8	7	8	8	9
Dunărea Călărași	13	13	13	13	13	13	13	12	13	13	13	12	12	13
Gaz Metan Mediaș	8	7	7	7	7	7	7	7	7	7	8	7	7	7
Hermannstadt	11	12	12	12	12	12	12	13	12	12	12	13	13	12
Politehnica Iași	10	8	10	9	9	9	10	10	10	10	10	10	10	10
Voluntari	12	11	9	10	11	10	11	11	11	11	11	11	11	11

== Promotion/relegation play-offs ==
The 12th-placed team of the Liga I faced the 3rd-placed team of the Liga II.

Team 1	Agg.	Team 2	1st leg	2nd leg
Hermannstadt	2–1	Universitatea Cluj	2–0	0–1

9 June 2019	Universitatea Cluj	0–2	Hermannstadt	Cluj-Napoca
18:00 EEST (UTC+3)		Report	Petrescu 79'; Tsoumou 80'	Stadium: Cluj Arena; Attendance: 25,664; Referee: Andrei Chivulete (Bucharest)

12 June 2019	Hermannstadt	0–1	Universitatea Cluj	Sibiu
18:00 EEST (UTC+3)		Report	Goga 64'	Stadium: Municipal; Attendance: 4,500; Referee: Marius Avram (Bucharest)

== Season statistics ==
=== Top scorers ===
Updated to matches played on 2 June 2019.

Rank	Player	Club	Goals
1	(Romania) George Țucudean	CFR Cluj	18
2	(France) Harlem Gnohéré	FCSB	15
3	(Italy) Mattia Montini	Dinamo București	13
3	(Bosnia and Herzegovina) Elvir Koljić	Universitatea Craiova	13
3	(Romania) Alexandru Mitriță^{1}	Universitatea Craiova	13
6	(Romania) Florinel Coman	FCSB	11
6	(Mali) Ibrahima Tandia	Sepsi OSK	11
8	(Romania) Florin Tănase	FCSB	10
8	(Venezuela) Mario Rondón	Gaz Metan Mediaș	10
8	(Romania) Ianis Hagi	Viitorul Constanța	10
8	(Romania) Alexandru Tudorie	Voluntari	10
12	(Romania) Mihai Roman II	Botoșani	9
12	(Romania) Dennis Man	FCSB	9

^{1} Alexandru Mitriță was transferred to New York City during the winter transfer window.

=== Hat-tricks ===
Player	For	Against	Result	Date
(Romania) Nicușor Bancu	Universitatea Craiova	Voluntari	5–1	27 August 2018
(Romania) George Țucudean	CFR Cluj	Voluntari	5–0	30 November 2018
(Italy) Mattia Montini	Dinamo București	Universitatea Craiova	3–0	15 December 2018
(Venezuela) Mario Rondón	Gaz Metan Mediaș	Hermannstadt	4–1	3 May 2019

=== Clean sheets ===
Updated to matches played on 2 June 2019.

Rank	Player	Club	Clean sheets
1	(Lithuania) Giedrius Arlauskis	CFR Cluj	18
2	(Italy) Mirko Pigliacelli	Universitatea Craiova	16
3	(Romania) Răzvan Pleșca	Gaz Metan Mediaș	13
4	(Romania) Cristian Bălgrădean	FCSB	12
5	(Romania) Cătălin Straton	Dunărea Călărași	11
6	(Romania) Cătălin Căbuz	Hermannstadt	10
7	(Romania) Roland Niczuly	Sepsi OSK	9
8	(Romania) Eduard Pap	Botoșani	8
8	(Austria) Martin Fraisl	Botoșani	8
8	(Democratic Republic of the Congo) Parfait Mandanda	Dinamo Bucuresti	8
11	(Romania) Valentin Cojocaru	Viitorul Constanța	7
12	(Moldova) Denis Rusu	Politehnica Iași	6
12	(Romania) Cosmin Vâtcă	Voluntari	6

=== Discipline ===
Updated 2 June 2019

==== Player ====
- Most yellow cards: 15
  - (Romania) Alexandru Răuță (Voluntari)
- Most red cards: 3
  - (Argentina) Emmanuel Culio (CFR Cluj)

==== Club ====
- Most yellow cards: 130
  - Concordia Chiajna
- Most red cards: 8
  - Astra Giurgiu
  - FCSB
  - Gaz Metan Mediaș

== Attendances ==
Pos	Team	Total	High	Low	Average	Change
1	Universitatea Craiova	267,100	30,000	3,500	14,839	+26.8%
2	FCSB	125,855	27,835	700	6,992	−29.5%^{3}
3	CFR Cluj	90,912	14,000	1,000	5,051	−19.5%
4	Dunărea Călărași	60,570	8,000	1,000	3,029	+97.5%^{1}
5	Sepsi OSK	52,500	3,500	2,000	2,917	+4.7%
6	Viitorul Constanța	51,000	4,500	1,000	2,833	+12.6%
7	Dinamo București	53,039	21,763	150	2,652	−7.7%
8	Botoșani	48,500	5,000	300	2,425	−19.4%
9	Politehnica Iași	47,600	6,800	200	2,380	−37.8%
10	Gaz Metan Mediaș	40,700	6,500	400	2,035	+53.4%
11	Hermannstadt	27,070	5,000	50	1,354	−65.2%^{1, 2}
12	Voluntari	24,827	3,766	50	1,241	−5.4%
13	Astra Giurgiu	21,650	3,500	200	1,203	−33.4%
14	Concordia Chiajna	12,400	3,000	50	620	−41.1%
	League total	923,732	30,000	50	3,447	−2.8%

Updated to games played on 2 June 2019
Source: League matches: Liga I 2018/2019
Notes:
1: Played last season in Liga II.
2: Hermannstadt played 16 matches out of their stadium which was under renovation.
3: FCSB played 5 matches out of their stadium.

== Champion squad ==
CFR Cluj

Goalkeepers: Giedrius Arlauskis (Lithuania) (31 / 0); Jesús Fernández (Spain) (3 / 0); Cosmin Vâtcă (2 / 0).
Defenders: Kévin Boli (Ivory Coast) (10 / 0); Mário Camora (Portugal) (32 / 1); Ádám Lang (Hungary) (18 / 0); Cristian Manea (34 / 1); Andrei Mureșan (22 / 2); Paulo Vinícius (Brazil) (31 / 2); Andrei Peteleu (8 / 0); Andrei Radu (1 / 0).
Midfielders: Mihai Bordeianu (26 / 1); Valentin Costache (18 / 1); Emmanuel Culio (Argentina) (25 / 5); Ciprian Deac (26 / 4); Damjan Đoković (Croatia) (33 / 4); Ovidiu Hoban (12 / 1); Alexandru Ioniță (23 / 2); Cătălin Itu (1 / 0); Sebastian Mailat (10 / 0); Mate Maleš (Croatia) (8 / 0); Thierry Moutinho (Portugal) (16 / 1); Adrian Păun (27 / 3); Claudiu Petrila (5 / 0).
Forwards: Júlio Baptista (Brazil) (2 / 0); Cristian Bud (4 / 0); Giuseppe De Luca (Italy) (3 / 0); Billel Omrani (Algeria) (32 / 6); Robert Tambe (Cameroon) (6 / 0); George Țucudean (27 / 8); Urko Vera (Spain) (2 / 0).
(league appearances and goals listed in brackets)

Manager: Edward Iordănescu / Toni Conceição (Portugal) / Alin Minteuan / Dan Petrescu.

== Awards ==
=== Liga I Team of the Regular Season ===

Liga I Team of the 2018–19 Regular Season – Liga Profesionistă de Fotbal

Player	Team	Position
(Italy) Mirko Pigliacelli	Universitatea Craiova	Goalkeeper
(Romania) Romario Benzar	FCSB	Defender
(Brazil) Paulo Vinícius	CFR Cluj	Defender
(Democratic Republic of the Congo) Mike Cestor	Astra Giurgiu	Defender
(Portugal) Camora	CFR Cluj	Defender
(Mali) Ibrahima Tandia	Sepsi OSK	Midfielder
(Romania) Alexandru Cicâldău	Universitatea Craiova	Midfielder
(Romania) Florin Tănase	FCSB	Midfielder
(Romania) Ianis Hagi	Viitorul	Forward
(Romania) George Țucudean	CFR Cluj	Forward
(Romania) Alexandru Mitriță	Universitatea Craiova	Forward

=== Liga I Team of the Championship play-offs ===

Liga I Team of the 2018–19 Championship play-offs – Liga Profesionistă de Fotbal

Player	Team	Position
(Lithuania) Giedrius Arlauskis	CFR Cluj	Goalkeeper
(Romania) Romario Benzar	FCSB	Defender
(Brazil) Paulo Vinícius	CFR Cluj	Defender
(Romania) Iulian Cristea	FCSB	Defender
(Portugal) Camora	CFR Cluj	Defender
(Croatia) Damjan Djoković	CFR Cluj	Midfielder
(Romania) Alexandru Cicâldău	Universitatea Craiova	Midfielder
(Romania) Dennis Man	FCSB	Midfielder
(Romania) Ianis Hagi	Viitorul	Midfielder
(Romania) Florinel Coman	FCSB	Forward
(France) Harlem Gnohéré	FCSB	Forward

=== Liga I Team of the Season ===

Liga I Team of the 2018–19 Season – Liga Profesionistă de Fotbal

Player	Team	Position
(Italy) Mirko Pigliacelli	Universitatea Craiova	Goalkeeper
(Romania) Romario Benzar	FCSB	Defender
(Brazil) Paulo Vinícius	CFR Cluj	Defender
(Portugal) Camora	CFR Cluj	Defender
(Romania) Dennis Man	FCSB	Midfielder
(Romania) Dan Nistor	Dinamo București	Midfielder
(Romania) Alexandru Cicâldău	Universitatea Craiova	Midfielder
(Romania) Florinel Coman	FCSB	Midfielder
(Romania) Ianis Hagi	Viitorul	Forward
(Romania) George Țucudean	CFR Cluj	Forward
(France) Harlem Gnohéré	FCSB	Forward
