= 2019–20 Sepsi OSK Sfântu Gheorghe season =

Sepsi Sfântu Gheorghe
2019–20 season
- General Manager: Dávid Kertész
- Head Coach: Leo Grozavu
- Stadium: Stadionul Municipal

The 2019–20 season is the 9th season in Sepsi Sfântu Gheorghe's history, and the 3rd in the top-flight of Romanian football. Sepsi is competing in Liga I and in the Cupa României.

== Players ==
=== Current squad ===
Updated last, 1 July 2019 33 Roland Niczuly 95 Béla Fejér ×× Horatiu Moldován 4 Razvan Tincu 3 Hrovje Barisic

== Pre-season and friendlies ==
Win Draw Loss

== Competitions ==
Win Draw Loss

=== Overview ===
Competition	First match	Last match	Starting round	Final position	Record							
Competition	First match	Last match	Starting round	Final position	Pld	W	D	L	GF	GA	GD	Win %
Liga I	July 2019	–	Matchday 1	–	0	0	0	0	0	0	+0	—
Cupa României	October 2019	–	Round of 32	–	0	0	0	0	0	0	+0	—
Total					0	0	0	0	0	0	+0	—

Last updated: 9 June 2019
Source: Competitions

=== Liga I ===
The Liga I fixture list was announced in July 2019.

==== Regular season ====
===== Table =====
Pos	Team	Pld	W	D	L	GF	GA	GD	Pts	Qualification
7	Viitorul Constanța	26	11	7	8	44	29	+15	40	Qualification for the Relegation round
8	Dinamo București	26	10	4	12	37	41	−4	34	Qualification for the Relegation round
9	Sepsi OSK	26	7	12	7	30	26	+4	33	Qualification for the Relegation round
10	Hermannstadt	26	5	10	11	26	44	−18	25	Qualification for the Relegation round
11	Chindia Târgoviște	26	6	7	13	29	47	−18	25	Qualification for the Relegation round

Source: LPF (in Romanian), Soccerway
Rules for classification: 1) Points; 2) Head-to-head points; 3) Head-to-head goal difference; 4) Head-to-head goals scored; 5) Goal difference; 6) Goals scored; 7) Play-off.

===== Results by round =====
Round	1	2	3	4	5	6	7	8	9	10	11	12	13	14	15	16	17	18	19	20	21	22	23	24	25	26
Ground	A	H	A	H	A	H	A	H	A	H	A	A	H	H	A	H	A	H	A	H	A	H	A	H	H	A
Result	D	D	D	D	W	D	D	L	D	W	D	D	L	D	L	L	L	W								
Position																										

Updated to match(es) played on December 2019. Source: Liga I
A = Away; H = Home; W = Win; D = Draw; L = Loss

===== Matches =====
Win Draw Loss

13 July 2019 1	Voluntari	0-0	Sepsi Sfântu Gheorghe	Voluntari
				Stadium: Anghel Iordănescu

20 July 2019 2	Sepsi Sfântu Gheorghe	0-0	FCSB	Sibiu
				Stadium: Municipal

27 July 2019 3	Gaz Metan Mediaș	1-1	Sepsi Sfântu Gheorghe	Mediaș
				Stadium: Gaz Metan

3 August 2019 4	Sepsi Sfântu Gheorghe	2-2	Viitorul Constanța	Sibiu
				Stadium: Municipal

10 August 2019 5	Universitatea Craiova	0-1	Sepsi Sfântu Gheorghe	Craiova
				Stadium: Ion Oblemenco

17 August 2019 6	Sepsi Sfântu Gheorghe	1-1	CFR Cluj	Sibiu
				Stadium: Municipal

24 August 2019 7	Academica Clinceni	1-1	Sepsi Sfântu Gheorghe	Clinceni
				Stadium: Clinceni

31 August 2019 8	Sepsi Sfântu Gheorghe	0-1	Dinamo București	Sibiu
				Stadium: Municipal

14 September 2019 9	Chindia Târgoviște	0-0	Sepsi Sfântu Gheorghe	Ploiești
				Stadium: Ilie Oană

21 September 2019 10	Sepsi Sfântu Gheorghe	3-0	Hermannstadt	Sibiu
				Stadium: Municipal

28 September 2019 11	Politehnica Iași	1-1	Sepsi Sfântu Gheorghe	Iași
				Stadium: Emil Alexandrescu

5 October 2019 12	Botoșani	1-1	Sepsi Sfântu Gheorghe	Botoșani
				Stadium: Municipal

19 October 2019 13	Sepsi Sfântu Gheorghe	2-3	Astra Giurgiu	Sibiu
				Stadium: Municipal

26 October 2019 14	Sepsi Sfântu Gheorghe	0-0	Voluntari	Sibiu
				Stadium: Municipal

2 November 2019 15	FCSB	2-1	Sepsi Sfântu Gheorghe	Bucharest
				Stadium: Arena Națională

9 November 2019 16	Sepsi Sfântu Gheorghe	0-1	Gaz Metan Mediaș	Sibiu
				Stadium: Municipal

23 November 2019 17	Viitorul Constanța	4-1	Sepsi Sfântu Gheorghe	Ovidiu
				Stadium: Viitorul

30 November 2019 18	Sepsi Sfântu Gheorghe	1-0	Universitatea Craiova	Sibiu
				Stadium: Municipal

4 December 2019 19	CFR Cluj	1-0	Sepsi Sfântu Gheorghe	Cluj-Napoca
				Stadium: Dr. Constantin Rădulescu

7 December 2019 20	Sepsi Sfântu Gheorghe	4-0	Academica Clinceni	Sibiu
				Stadium: Municipal

14 December 2019 21	Dinamo București	1-2	Sepsi Sfântu Gheorghe	Bucharest
				Stadium: Dinamo

21 December 2019 22	Sepsi Sfântu Gheorghe	3-1	Chindia Târgoviște	Sibiu
				Stadium: Municipal

1 February 2020 23	Hermannstadt	v	Sepsi Sfântu Gheorghe	Sfântu Gheorghe
				Stadium: Municipal

8 February 2020 24	Sepsi Sfântu Gheorghe	v	Politehnica Iași	Sibiu
				Stadium: Municipal

15 February 2020 25	Sepsi Sfântu Gheorghe	v	Botoșani	Sibiu
				Stadium: Municipal

22 February 2020 26	Astra Giurgiu	v	Sepsi Sfântu Gheorghe	Giurgiu
				Stadium: Marin Anastasovici

=== Cupa României ===
Sepsi will enter the Cupa României at the Round of 32.

== Statistics ==
=== Appearances and goals ===
As of June 2019

No.	Pos	Player	Liga I		Cupa României		Total	
No.	Pos	Player	Apps	Goals	Apps	Goals	Apps	Goals

=== Squad statistics ===
	Liga I	Cupa României	Home	Away	Total Stats
Games played	0	0	0	0	0
Games won	0	0	0	0	0
Games drawn	0	0	0	0	0
Games lost	0	0	0	0	0
Goals scored	0	0	0	0	0
Goals conceded	0	0	0	0	0
Goal difference	0	0	0	0	0
Clean sheets	0	0	0	0	0
Goal by Substitute	0	0	0	0	0
Total shots	–	–	–	–	–
Shots on target	–	–	–	–	–
Corners	–	–	–	–	–
Players used	–	–	–	–	–
Offsides	–	–	–	–	–
Fouls suffered	–	–	–	–	–
Fouls committed	–	–	–	–	–
Yellow cards	0	0	0	0	0
Red cards	0	0	0	0	0
Winning rate	0%	0%	0%	0%	0%

Last updated: 13 July 2018
Source: Competitive matches

=== Goalscorers ===
As of June 2019

Rank	Position	Name	Liga I	Cupa României	Total
Total			0	0	0

=== Goal minutes ===
	1'–15'	16'–30'	31'–HT	46'–60'	61'–75'	76'–FT	Extra time	Forfeit
Goals	0	0	0	0	0	0	0	0
Percentage	0%	0%	0%	0%	0%	0%	0%	0%

Last updated: 2019 (UTC)
Source: Soccerway

=== Hat-tricks ===
Player	Against	Result	Date	Competition

=== Clean sheets ===
As of 2019

Rank	Name	Liga I	Cupa României	Total	Games played
Total		0	0	0	0

=== Disciplinary record ===
As of 2019

Rank	Position	Name	Liga I			Cupa României			Total		
Rank	Position	Name	Yellow card	(yellow card) (yellow-red card)	Red card	Yellow card	(yellow card) (yellow-red card)	Red card	Yellow card	(yellow card) (yellow-red card)	Red card
Total			0	0	0	0	0	0	0	0	0

=== Attendances ===
As of 2019

	Matches	Attendances	Average	High	Low
Liga I	0	0	0	0	0
Cupa României	0	0	0	0	0
Total	0	0	0	0	0

== See also ==
- 2019–20 Cupa României
- 2019–20 Liga I
