= Cătălin Căbuz =

Romanian footballer (born 1996)

Personal information
- Full name: Cătălin Vasile Căbuz
- Date of birth: 18 June 1996 (age 30)
- Place of birth: Avrig, Romania
- Height: 1.84 m (6 ft 0 in)
- Position: Goalkeeper

Team information
- Current team: Argeș Pitești
- Number: 34

Youth career
- 2003–2006: FC Sibiu
- 2006–2009: Șoimii Sibiu
- 2009–2011: Gheorghe Hagi Academy
- 2011–2013: Voința Sibiu
- 2013–2015: Gheorghe Hagi Academy

Senior career*
Years	Team	Apps	(Gls)
2015–2021	Viitorul Constanța	38	(0)
2015–2016	→ Măgura Cisnădie (loan)		
2016	→ CSM Râmnicu Vâlcea (loan)	11	(0)
2017	→ Chindia Târgoviște (loan)	8	(0)
2017–2019	→ Hermannstadt (loan)	65	(0)
2021–2023	Chindia Târgoviște	64	(0)
2023–2024	CFR Cluj	0	(0)
2023–2024	→ Hermannstadt (loan)	32	(0)
2024–2026	Hermannstadt	59	(0)
2026–	Argeș Pitești	21	(0)

International career
2017–2019	Romania U21	3	(0)
- * Club domestic league appearances and goals as of 13 September 2026

Cătălin Vasile Căbuz (born 18 June 1996) is a Romanian professional footballer who plays as a goalkeeper for Liga I club Argeș Pitești.

== Club career ==
Born in Avrig, Sibiu County, Căbuz grew up at local academies of FC Sibiu, Șoimii Sibiu or Voința Sibiu, but also played for Gheorghe Hagi Football Academy squads in 2 periods. At senior level Căbuz never played in an official match for Viitorul Constanța, being loaned to different teams such as: Râmnicu Vâlcea, Chindia Târgoviște or Hermannstadt.

== Career statistics ==
=== Club ===
As of match played 28 October 2026

Club	Season	League			Cupa României		Europe		Other		Total	
Club	Season	Division	Apps	Goals	Apps	Goals	Apps	Goals	Apps	Goals	Apps	Goals
Măgura Cisnădie (loan)	2015–16	Liga III	?	?	?	?	–		–		?	?
CSM Râmnicu Vâlcea (loan)	2016–17	Liga II	11	0	1	0	–		–		12	0
Chindia Târgoviște (loan)	2016–17	Liga II	8	0	–		–		–		8	0
Hermannstadt (loan)	2017–18	Liga II	27	0	3	0	–		–		30	0
Hermannstadt (loan)	2018–19	Liga I	38	0	0	0	–		2 (Note: Appearances in Liga I promotion/relegation play-offs)	0	40	0
Hermannstadt (loan)	Total		65	0	3	0	–		2	0	70	0
Viitorul Constanța	2019–20	Liga I	29	0	0	0	1 (Note: Appearances in UEFA Europa League)	0	0	0	30	0
Viitorul Constanța	2020–21	Liga I	9	0	1	0	–		0	0	10	0
Viitorul Constanța	Total		38	0	1	0	1	0	0	0	40	0
Chindia Târgoviște	2021–22	Liga I	30	0	1	0	–		2	0	33	0
Chindia Târgoviște	2022–23	Liga I	34	0	1	0	–		–		35	0
Chindia Târgoviște	Total		64	0	2	0	–		2	0	68	0
CFR Cluj	2023–24	Liga I	0	0	–		0	0	–		0	0
Hermannstadt (loan)	2023–24	Liga I	32	0	2	0	–		–		34	0
Hermannstadt	2024–25	Liga I	36	0	1	0	–		–		37	0
Hermannstadt	2025–26	Liga I	23	0	0	0	–		–		23	0
Hermannstadt	Total		91	0	3	0	–		–		94	0
Argeș Pitești	2025–26	Liga I	12	0	2	0	–		–		14	0
Argeș Pitești	2026–27	Liga I	9	0	2	0	–		–		11	0
Argeș Pitești	Total		21	0	4	0	–		–		25	0
Career total			298	0	14	0	1	0	4	0	317	0

== Honours ==
Hermannstadt

- Cupa României runner-up: 2017–18, 2024–25

Viitorul Constanța

- Supercupa României: 2019
