= Cătălin Pârvulescu =

Romanian footballer

Personal information
- Full name: Marin Cătălin Pârvulescu
- Date of birth: 11 June 1991 (age 35)
- Place of birth: Râmnicu Vâlcea, Romania
- Height: 1.85 m (6 ft 1 in)
- Position: Defender

Senior career*
Years	Team	Apps	(Gls)
2007–2013	Damila Măciuca	5	(1)
2013–2016	Râmnicu Vâlcea	93	(5)
2014	→ Pandurii Târgu Jiu (loan)	1	(0)
2017–2019	Hermannstadt	26	(1)
2019–2020	Turris Turnu Măgurele	34	(1)
2021–2022	Viitorul Târgu Jiu	0	(0)
2022–2024	Viitorul Dăești	71	(3)
2024–2025	Râmnicu Vâlcea	0	(0)
- * Club domestic league appearances and goals as of 08:26, 12 November 2024 (UTC)

Marin Cătălin Pârvulescu (born 11 June 1991) is a Romanian footballer who plays as a defender.

== Honours ==
Damila Măciuca

- Liga III: 2011–12
- Liga IV – Vâlcea County: 2010–11

Hermannstadt

- Liga III: 2016–17
- Cupa României: Runner-up 2017–18
