= Claudiu Pamfile =

Romanian footballer

Personal information
- Date of birth: 14 January 1997 (age 29)
- Place of birth: Tecuci, Romania
- Height: 1.78 m (5 ft 10 in)
- Position: Defender

Youth career
- –2015: FC Brașov

Senior career*
Years	Team	Apps	(Gls)
2015–2017	FC Brașov	3	(0)
2016–2017	→ AFC Hărman (loan)	22	(0)
2017–2018	Hermannstadt II	4	(1)
2017–2020	Hermannstadt	35	(1)
2020	Minaur Baia Mare	1	(0)
2020–2022	Politehnica Timișoara	37	(0)
2023–2023	Șoimii Lipova	25	(2)
2023	Phoenix Buziaș	15	(1)
2024	Politehnica Timișoara	10	(1)
2024	Peciu Nou	11	(4)
- * Club domestic league appearances and goals as of 17:40, 5 January 2025 (UTC)

Claudiu Pamfile (born 14 January 1997) is a Romanian professional footballer who plays as a defender.

== Honours ==
Hermannstadt

- Cupa României runner-up: 2017–18
