= Ionuț Stoica =

Romanian footballer

Personal information
- Date of birth: 6 January 1988 (age 38)
- Place of birth: Râmnicu Vâlcea, Romania
- Height: 1.86 m (6 ft 1 in)
- Position: Defender

Team information
- Current team: Inter Sibiu
- Number: 4

Youth career
- 1997–2007: Oltchim Râmnicu Vâlcea

Senior career*
Years	Team	Apps	(Gls)
2007–2010	Oltchim Râmnicu Vâlcea		
2011	Olt Slatina		
2011–2013	Damila Măciuca	19	(1)
2013–2016	CSM Râmnicu Vâlcea	85	(1)
2016–2017	Mioveni	25	(4)
2017–2026	Hermannstadt	264	(14)
2026–	Inter Sibiu	8	(1)
- * Club domestic league appearances and goals as of 18 May 2026

Ionuț Stoica (born 6 January 1988) is a Romanian professional footballer who plays as a defender for Liga III club Inter Sibiu.

== Career ==
Stoica grew up at Oltchim Râmnicu Vâlcea football academy and played at senior level for teams such as: Oltchim Râmnicu Vâlcea, CSM Râmnicu Vâlcea or CS Mioveni, among others.

== Honours ==
Olt Slatina

- Liga III: 2010–11

Damila Măciuca

- Liga III: 2011–12

Hermannstadt

- Cupa României runner-up: 2017–18, 2024–25
