= 2017–18 Cupa României =

Cupa României 2017–18
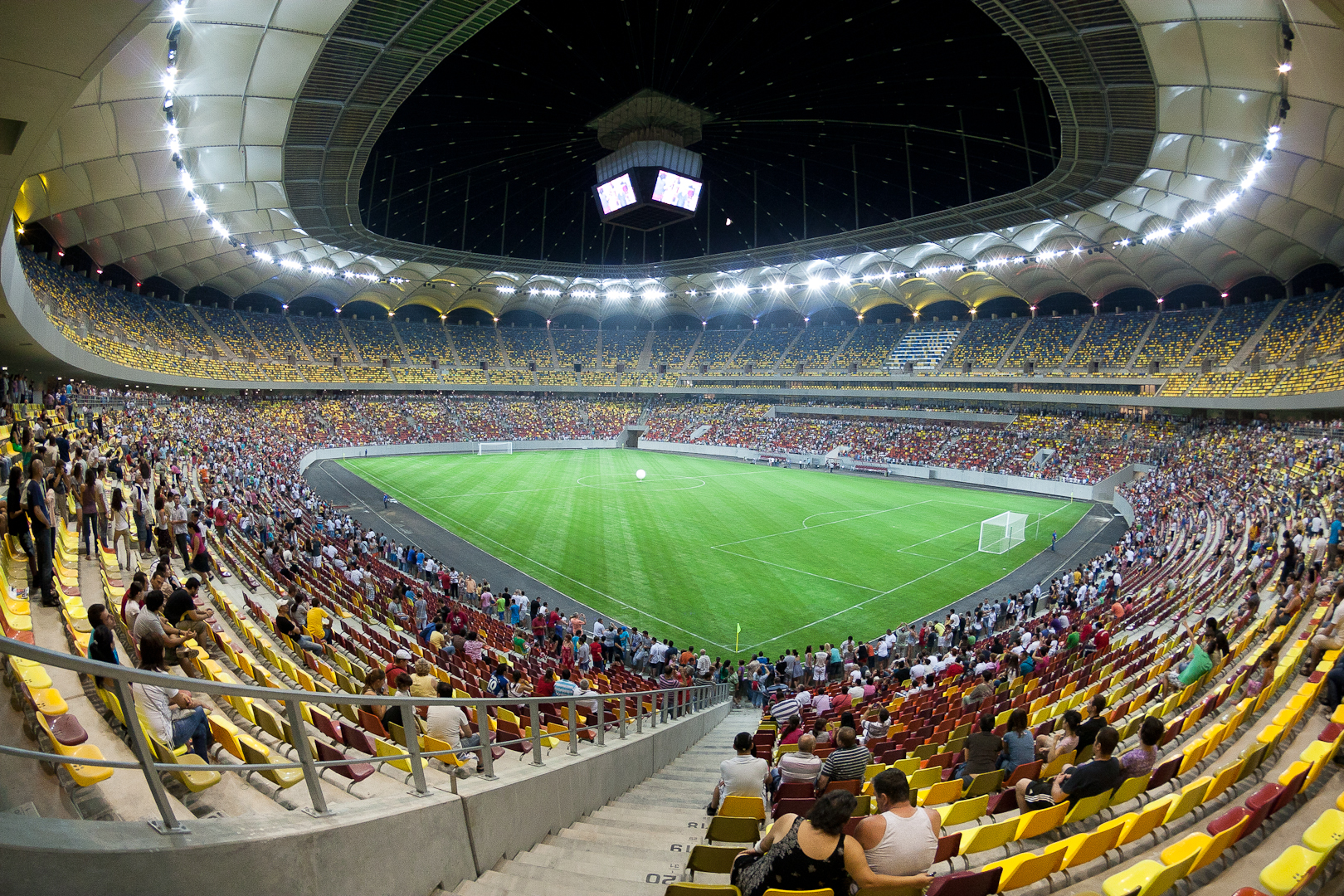

Tournament details
- Country: Romania
- Teams: 124

Final positions
- Champions: Universitatea Craiova
- Runners-up: Hermannstadt

The 2017–18 Cupa României was the 80th season of the annual Romanian primary football knockout tournament. The winner, Universitatea Craiova, qualified for the third qualifying round of the 2018–19 UEFA Europa League.

== Participating clubs ==
The following 124 teams qualified for the competition:

2016–17 Liga I all clubs (14)	2016–17 Liga II; Without dissolved clubs (15)	2016–17 Liga III; Without second teams and some dissolved clubs (53)
Viitorul Constanța; FCSB; Dinamo București; CFR Cluj; Universitatea Craiova; Astra Giurgiu; CSM Politehnica Iași; Gaz Metan Mediaș; Voluntari; Botoșani; Concordia Chiajna; ACS Poli Timișoara; Pandurii Târgu Jiu; Târgu Mureș	Juventus București; Sepsi OSK; UTA Arad; Mioveni; Chindia Târgoviște; Dunărea Călărași; Afumați; Olimpia Satu Mare; Luceafărul Oradea; Dacia Unirea Brăila; Foresta Suceava; Balotești; Academica Clinceni; ASU Politehnica Timișoara; Sportul Snagov	Știința Miroslava; Metaloglobus București; Argeș Pitești; Ripensia Timișoara; Hermannstadt; AFC Hărman; Viitorul Domnești; Atletic Bradu; CSMȘ Reșița; Metalurgistul Cugir; Miercurea Ciuc; CS Tunari; FCM Alexandria; CSM Lugoj; Sănătatea Cluj; Aerostar Bacău; Național Sebiș; Unirea Jucu; Avântul Valea Mărului; Unirea Slobozia; Flacăra Moreni; Industria Galda de Jos; Comuna Recea; CSM Roman; SC Popești-Leordeni; Cetate Deva; FC Zalău; Olimpic Cetate Râșnov; Delta Dobrogea Tulcea; Sporting Roșiori; Performanța Ighiu; Avântul Reghin; Sporting Liești; Gloria Lunca-Teuz Cermei; Olimpia Râmnicu Sărat; CSM Oltenița; Unirea Dej; Metalosport Galați; CSO Filiași; Viitorul Ulmeni; Axiopolis Cernavodă; Unirea Alba Iulia; CS Iernut; AFC Odorheiu Secuiesc; Înainte Modelu; FC Aninoasa; Millenium Giarmata; CSM Pașcani; Șirineasa; Sportul Chiscani; Urban Titu; Nuova Mama Mia Becicherecu Mic
42 representatives of regional associations^{1}
Șurianu Sebeș (Alba); Șoimii Lipova (Arad); AS Colibași (Argeș); Viitorul Curița (Bacău); CS Diosig (Bihor); Voința Cetate (Bistrița-Năsăud); Transdor Tudora (Botoșani); ASF Zărnești (Brașov); Victoria Ianca (Brăila); Regal Sport Club (Bucharest); Gloria Buzău (Buzău); Voința Lupac (Caraș-Severin); Agricola Borcea (Călărași); Universitatea Cluj (Cluj)	Viitorul Fântânele (Constanța); FC Păpăuți (Covasna); Gloria Gaz Metan Cornești (Dâmbovița); Dunărea Calafat (Dolj); Zimbrul Slobozia Conachi (Galați); AS Mihai Bravu (Giurgiu); Știința Turceni (Gorj); Unirea Cristuru Secuiesc (Harghita); Inter Petrila (Hunedoara); Bărăganul Ciulnița (Ialomița); Unirea Mircești (Iași); CSO Bragadiru (Ilfov); Progresul Șomcuța Mare (Maramureș); Recolta Dănceu (Mehedinți)	Juvenes Târgu Mureș (Mureș); Cimentul Bicaz (Neamț); FC Milcov (Olt); Petrolul Ploiești (Prahova); Luceafărul Decebal (Satu Mare); Rapid Jibou (Sălaj); Spicul Șeica Mare (Sibiu); Bucovina Rădăuți (Suceava); Astra Plosca (Teleorman); Voința Biled (Timiș); Pescărușul Sarichioi (Tulcea); FC Gârceni (Vaslui); Posada Perișani (Vâlcea); CSM Focșani (Vrancea)

== Preliminary rounds ==
The first rounds, and any preliminaries, are organised by the Regional Leagues.

== First round ==
All matches were played on 9 August 2017.

Team 1	Score	Team 2
9 August 2017
TransDor Tudora (4)	4–0	Bucovina Rădăuți (3)
Cimentul Bicaz (4)	2–0	Viitorul Curița (4)
Unirea Mircești (4)	2–1	CSM Pașcani (3)
FC Gârceni (4)	1–2	Sportul Chiscani (3)
Voința Cetate (4)	0–7	Universitatea Cluj (3)
Progresul Șomcuța Mare (4)	2–2 (a.e.t.) (4–2 p)	Rapid Jibou (4)
Luceafărul Decebal (4)	0–2	CS Diosig (4)
Șurianu Sebeș (4)	w/o	Unirea Alba Iulia (3)
Juvenes Târgu Mureș (4)	w/o	Unirea Cristuru Secuiesc (4)
FC Păpăuți (4)	4–2	AFC Odorheiu Secuiesc (3)
Spicul Șeica Mare (4)	1–2	ASF Zărnești (4)
Voința Biled (4)	6–1	Nuova Mama Mia Becicherecu Mic (3)
Șoimii Lipova (3)	6–0	Millenium Giarmata (3)
Voința Lupac (4)	3–2	Inter Petrila (4)
Recolta Dănceu (4)	0–0 (a.e.t.) (4–5 p)	Știința Turceni (4)
Dunărea Calafat (4)	0–2	FC Milcov (4)
Posada Perișani (4)	w/o	Șirineasa (3)
AS Colibași (4)	1–2	Urban Titu (3)
Gloria Gaz Metan Cornești (4)	2–0	FC Aninoasa (3)
Astra Plosca (4)	3–2	AS Mihai Bravu (4)
Bărăganul Ciulnița (4)	4–6	Agricola Borcea (3)
Regal Sport Club (4)	1–8	Petrolul Ploiești (3)
CSO Bragadiru (4)	1–6	Înainte Modelu (3)
Victoria Ianca (4)	1–4	CSM Focșani (3)
Viitorul Fântânele (4)	7–0	Pescărușul Sarichioi (4)
Gloria Buzău (4)	2–3	Zimbrul Slobozia Conachi (4)

== Second round ==
All matches were played on 22 August 2017.

Team 1	Score	Team 2
22 August 2017
TransDor Tudora (4)	1–4	CSM Roman (3)
Cimentul Bicaz (4)	1–3	FK Miercurea Ciuc (3)
Unirea Mircești (4)	w/o	Aerostar Bacău (3)
CSM Focșani (3)	5–0	Metalosport Galați (3)
Zimbrul Slobozia Conachi (4)	3–2	Avântul Valea Mărului (3)
Sportul Chiscani (3)	1–3	Sporting Liești (3)
FC Păpăuți (4)	0–1	Olimpia Râmnicu Sărat (3)
Viitorul Fântânele (4)	w/o	Delta Dobrogea Tulcea (3)
Agricola Borcea (3)	2–0	Axiopolis Cernavodă (3)
Înainte Modelu (3)	5–1	CSM Oltenița (3)
SC Popești-Leordeni (3)	1–1 (a.e.t.) (5–6 p)	Unirea Slobozia (3)
FCM Alexandria (3)	5–3	CS Tunari (3)
Astra Plosca (4)	1–5	Sporting Roșiori (3)
Petrolul Ploiești (3)	2–0	Urban Titu (3)
Gloria Gaz Metan Cornești (4)	1–2	Flacăra Moreni (3)
FC Milcov (4)	w/o	CSO Filiași (3)
Știința Turceni (4)	0–3	Șirineasa (3)
Voința Lupac (4)	2–5 (a.e.t.)	Cetate Deva (3)
Voința Biled (4)	2–1	CSM Lugoj (3)
Șoimii Lipova (3)	3–0	Gloria Lunca Teuz Cermei (3)
CS Diosig (4)	0–3	Național Sebiș (3)
Progresul Șomcuța Mare (4)	2–10	Comuna Recea (3)
Unirea Alba Iulia (3)	1–0	Unirea Dej (3)
CS Iernut (3)	0–1	Industria Galda (3)
Unirea Cristuru Secuiesc (4)	3–1	Avântul Reghin (3)
ASF Zărnești (4)	1–5	Olimpic Cetate Râșnov (3)
Performanța Ighiu (3)	w/o	Unirea Jucu (4)
Universitatea Cluj (3)	w/o	Viitorul Ulmeni (4)
FC Zalău (4)	w/o	Sănătatea Cluj (3)

== Third round ==
All matches were played on 12 and 13 September 2017.

Team 1	Score	Team 2
12 September 2017
Aerostar Bacău (3)	2–0	FK Miercurea Ciuc (3)
FCM Alexandria (3)	4–0	Viitorul Domnești (3)
CSO Filiași (3)	2–1	Sporting Roșiori (3)
Șirineasa (3)	2–0	Atletic Bradu (3)
Cetate Deva (3)	0–1	CSM Școlar Reșița (3)
Șoimii Lipova (3)	w/o	Național Sebiș (3)
Performanța Ighiu (3)	0–0 (a.e.t.) (7–6 p)	Metalurgistul Cugir (3)
Petrolul Ploiești (3)	3–0	Flacăra Moreni (3)
13 September 2017
CSM Roman (3)	1–1 (a.e.t.) (2–3 p)	Știința Miroslava (2)
Olimpic Cetate Râșnov (3)	1–2 (a.e.t.)	AFC Hărman (3)
CSM Focșani (3)	3–1	Olimpia Râmnicu Sărat (3)
Zimbrul Slobozia Conachi (4)	1–2	Sporting Liești (3)
Delta Dobrogea Tulcea (3)	1–4	Unirea Slobozia (3)
Agricola Borcea (3)	2–1	Înainte Modelu (3)
Voința Biled (4)	1–0	Ripensia Timișoara (2)
Unirea Alba Iulia (3)	1–1 (a.e.t.) (2–4 p)	Industria Galda (3)
Unirea Cristuru Secuiesc (4)	1–2	Sănătatea Cluj (3)
Universitatea Cluj (3)	5–1	Comuna Recea (3)

== Fourth round ==
All matches were played on 3 and 4 October 2017.

Team 1	Score	Team 2
3 October 2017
Aerostar Bacău (3)	1–0	Foresta Suceava (2)
CSM Focșani (3)	0–5	Știința Miroslava (2)
Agricola Borcea (3)	1–4	Petrolul Ploiești (3)
Unirea Slobozia (3)	2–1	Dunărea Călărași (2)
FCM Alexandria (3)	1–3	Academica Clinceni (2)
CSO Filiași (3)	2–2 (a.e.t.) (3–5 p)	Argeș Pitești (2)
CSM Școlar Reșița (3)	2–2 (a.e.t.) (5–3 p)	Pandurii Târgu Jiu (2)
Universitatea Cluj (3)	2–0	Olimpia Satu Mare (2)
Sănătatea Cluj (3)	3–1	Luceafărul Oradea (2)
4 October 2017
Sporting Liești (3)	2–2 (a.e.t.) (2–4 p)	Dacia Unirea Brăila (2)
Metaloglobus București (2)	2–0	Sportul Snagov (2)
Balotești (2)	0–4	Afumați (2)
AFC Hărman (3)	0–4	Chindia Târgoviște (2)
Șirineasa (3)	0–3 (forfait)	Mioveni (2)
Voința Biled (4)	0–1	ASU Politehnica Timișoara (2)
Național Sebiș (3)	1–4	UTA Arad (2)
Performanța Ighiu (3)	1–1 (a.e.t.) (3–5 p)	Târgu Mureș (2)
Industria Galda (3)	1–3	Hermannstadt (2)

== Round of 32 ==
The matches were played on 24, 25 and 26 October 2017.

24 October 2017	Argeș Pitești (2)	1–2	CSM Politehnica Iași (1)	Pitești
16:00	I.Năstăsie 52' (pen.)	Report	Spătaru 71'; Cissé 86'	Stadium: Nicolae Dobrin; Attendance: 250; Referee: Marius Avram (Bucharest)

24 October 2017	Petrolul Ploiești (3)	1–1 (a.e.t.) (3–4 p)	Mioveni (2)	Ploiești
18:00	Vintilă 90+2'	Report	C.Năstăsie 35'	Stadium: Ilie Oană; Attendance: 3,000; Referee: Lucian Rusandu (Sfântu Gheorghe)
	Penalties
	Tudor (penalty scored); Ciocâlteu (penalty missed); Popescu (penalty scored); Velisar (penalty missed); Stănescu (penalty scored)		C.Năstăsie (penalty scored); Gugu (penalty missed); Negoiță (penalty scored); E.Stoica (penalty scored); Neacșu (penalty scored)

24 October 2017	Universitatea Cluj (3)	2–1	Știința Miroslava (2)	Cluj-Napoca
19:00	Giurgiu 61' (pen.); Lemac 89'	Report	Al.Marin 73' (pen.)	Stadium: Cluj Arena; Attendance: 2,000; Referee: Adrian Comănescu (Rm.Vâlcea)

24 October 2017	Sepsi OSK (1)	0–2	Universitatea Craiova (1)	Brașov
20:30		Report	Mitriță 27'; Băluță 88'	Stadium: Silviu Ploeșteanu; Attendance: 3,400; Referee: Andrei Chivulete (Bucharest)

25 October 2017	Hermannstadt (2)	1–0 (a.e.t.)	Voluntari (1)	Sibiu
14:00	Dâlbea 97'	Report		Stadium: Municipal; Attendance: 5,000; Referee: Marian Barbu (Făgăraș)

25 October 2017	Academica Clinceni (2)	0–1	Chindia Târgoviște (2)	Clinceni
14:30		Report	L.Mihai 79'	Stadium: Clinceni; Attendance: 150; Referee: Dan Botescu (Bucharest)

25 October 2017	Afumați (2)	5–2	UTA Arad (2)	Afumați
14:30	Dedu 16' (pen.), 64'; Buduroi 49'; Olariu 73' (pen.), 88'	Report	Stahl 39', 42'	Stadium: Comunal; Attendance: 100; Referee: Cătălin Buși (Rm.Vâlcea)

25 October 2017	Unirea Slobozia (3)	4–0	Târgu Mureș (2)	Slobozia
14:30	Bucă 9', 10', 16', 25'	Report		Stadium: 1 Mai; Attendance: 2,000; Referee: Eduard Ioniță (Constanța)

25 October 2017	Metaloglobus București (2)	1–2	Gaz Metan Mediaș (1)	Bucharest
14:30	Bilciurescu 3'	Report	Baradji 14' (o.g.); Mitić 71'	Stadium: Metaloglobus; Attendance: 300; Referee: Iulian Dima (Bucharest)

25 October 2017	Dacia Unirea Brăila (2)	1–2	Juventus București (1)	Brăila
14:30	Banyoi 84'	Report	Băjenaru 17'; Al.Zaharia 74'	Stadium: Municipal; Attendance: 500; Referee: Mihai Amorăriței (Câmpina)

25 October 2017	CSM Școlar Reșița (3)	2–4	Viitorul Constanța (1)	Reșița
14:30	Costin 85'; Liuba 90' (pen.)	Report	C.Ene 5', 7'; Mățan 13'; Vînă 64'	Stadium: Mircea Chivu; Attendance: 4,000; Referee: Marian Balaci (Turnu Severin)

25 October 2017	Concordia Chiajna (1)	0–3	Astra Giurgiu (1)	Chiajna
16:00		Report	Moise 40', 74'; V.Gheorghe 82'	Stadium: Concordia; Attendance: 150; Referee: Robert Dumitru (Sfântu Gheorghe)

25 October 2017	ASU Politehnica Timișoara (2)	0–1	Poli Timișoara (1)	Timișoara
18:00		Report	Abraw 52'	Stadium: Dan Păltinișanu; Attendance: 3,000; Referee: Denis Haidiner (Hunedoara)

25 October 2017	Sănătatea Cluj (3)	1–6	FCSB (1)	Cluj-Napoca
20:30	Negru 83'	Report	Man 17', 23' (pen.); D.Benzar 32'; De Amorim 45'; Achim 58'; I.Stoica 90+2'	Stadium: Cluj Arena; Attendance: 4,500; Referee: Florin Andrei (Târgu Mureș)

26 October 2017	Botoșani (1)	1–1 (a.e.t.) (3–2 p)	CFR Cluj (1)	Botoșani
18:00	J.Rodríguez 69'	Report	Omrani 42'	Stadium: Municipal; Attendance: 3,000; Referee: Adrian Cojocaru (Galați)
	Penalties
	Târnovan (penalty scored); Moruțan (penalty scored); J.Rodríguez (penalty scored); Bordeianu (penalty missed)		Mureșan (penalty scored); Nistor (penalty missed); Omrani (penalty scored); Păun (penalty missed); Deac (penalty missed)

26 October 2017	Aerostar Bacău (3)	0–1	Dinamo București (1)	Piatra Neamț
21:00		Report	Nemec 85'	Stadium: Ceahlăul; Attendance: 3,000; Referee: Florin Mazilu (Satu Mare)

== Round of 16 ==
The matches were played on 28, 29 and 30 November 2017.

28 November 2017	Unirea Slobozia (3)	0–2	CSM Politehnica Iași (1)	Slobozia
14:00		Report	Pedro Mendes 10' (pen.); Ștefănescu 66'	Stadium: 1 Mai; Attendance: 400; Referee: Horia Mladinovici (Bucharest)

28 November 2017	Afumați (2)	2–3 (a.e.t.)	Universitatea Craiova (1)	Ploiești
18:00	Burlacu 10'; Vlada 93'	Report	Gustavo 66'; Băluță 101', 105'	Stadium: Ilie Oană; Attendance: 460; Referee: Florin Andrei (Târgu Mureș)

28 November 2017	Botoșani (1)	3–2	Viitorul Constanța (1)	Botoșani
21:00	Chitoșcă 50'; Roman 74'; Plămadă 81'	Report	Gavra 64'; Drăguș 78'	Stadium: Municipal; Attendance: 1,000; Referee: Marius Avram (Bucharest)

29 November 2017	Mioveni (2)	0–1	Gaz Metan Mediaș (1)	Mioveni
17:30		Report	Romeo 12'	Stadium: Orășenesc; Attendance: 500; Referee: Robert Dumitru (Sfântu Gheorghe)

29 November 2017	Universitatea Cluj (3)	1–1 (a.e.t.) (1–3 p)	Dinamo București (1)	Cluj-Napoca
20:30	Goga 34'	Report	Corbu 14'	Stadium: Cluj Arena; Attendance: 10,000; Referee: Ionuț Coza (Cernica)
	Penalties
	Goga (penalty missed); Florescu (penalty missed); Ursu (penalty scored); Chiș (penalty missed)		Anton (penalty missed); Filip (penalty scored); Rivaldinho (penalty scored); Salomão (penalty scored)

30 November 2017	Hermannstadt (2)	2–0	Juventus București (1)	Sibiu
14:00	Morariu 59' (o.g.); Tătar 67'	Report		Stadium: Municipal; Attendance: 4,000; Referee: Cătălin Popa (Pitești)

30 November 2017	Chindia Târgoviște (2)	0–2 (a.e.t.)	Astra Giurgiu (1)	Giurgiu
18:30		Report	Balaure 111'; Chipirliu 115'	Stadium: Marin Anastasovici; Referee: Adrian Cojocaru (Galați)

30 November 2017	Poli Timișoara (1)	0–3	FCSB (1)	Timișoara
21:30		Report	Gnohéré 34' (pen.); Golofca 55'; D. Benzar 90+2'	Stadium: Dan Păltinișanu; Referee: Ovidiu Hațegan (Arad)

== Quarter-finals ==
The matches were played on 27, 1 March, 6 March and 13 March 2018.

27 February 2018	Gaz Metan Mediaș (1)	1–0	Astra Giurgiu (1)	Mediaș
20:30	Rondón 27'	Report		Stadium: Gaz Metan; Attendance: 70; Referee: Andrei Chivulete (Bucharest)

1 March 2018	Hermannstadt (2)	3–0	FCSB (1)	Sibiu
14:00	Rusu 11', 62'; Blănaru 29'	Report		Stadium: Municipal; Attendance: 10,000; Referee: Cătălin Popa (Pitești)

6 March 2018	Universitatea Craiova (1)	1–0	Dinamo București (1)	Craiova
17:00	Bancu 56'	Report		Stadium: Ion Oblemenco; Attendance: 26,000; Referee: Horațiu Feșnic (Cluj-Napoca)

13 March 2018	Botoșani (1)	3–2 (a.e.t.)	CSM Politehnica Iași (1)	Botoșani
17:30	Golubović 89'; Roman 95' (pen.); Axente 111' (pen.)	Report	Cristea 90', 107'	Stadium: Municipal; Attendance: 500; Referee: George Găman (Craiova)

== Semi-finals ==
The semi-final matches are played in a round-trip system. The first legs were played on 17 and 19 April 2018 and the second legs were played on 9 May 2018.

Team 1	Agg.	Team 2	1st leg	2nd leg
Hermannstadt (2)	4–2	Gaz Metan Mediaș (1)	1–0	3–2
Universitatea Craiova (1)	6–3	Botoșani (1)	5–1	1–2

=== 1st leg ===
17 April 2018	Hermannstadt (2)	1–0	Gaz Metan Mediaș (1)	Sibiu
17:00	Rusu 39'	Report		Stadium: Municipal; Attendance: 8,000; Referee: Sebastian Colțescu (Craiova)

19 April 2018	Universitatea Craiova (1)	5–1	Botoșani (1)	Craiova
20:30	Băluță 13', 31', 83'; Gustavo 45+4' (pen.); Mitriță 65'	Report	Acsinte 35'	Stadium: Ion Oblemenco; Attendance: 22,000; Referee: Horațiu Feșnic (Cluj-Napoca)

=== 2nd leg ===
9 May 2018	Botoșani (1)	2–1	Universitatea Craiova (1)	Botoșani
17:00	Mircea Axente 13'; Golubović 66'	Report	Mitriță 61'	Stadium: Municipal; Attendance: 2,000; Referee: Marcel Bîrsan (Bucharest)

10 May 2018	Gaz Metan Mediaș (1)	2–3	Hermannstadt (2)	Mediaș
20:00	Popovici 6'; Caiado 78'	Report	Blănaru 11'; Petrescu 28'; Sîrghi 31' (o.g.)	Stadium: Gaz Metan; Attendance: 5,000 (2000 from Sibiu); Referee: István Kovács (Carei)

== Final ==
27 May 2018	Hermannstadt (2)	0–2	Universitatea Craiova (1)	Bucharest
21:00		Report	Gustavo 30'; Mitriță 58'	Stadium: Arena Națională; Attendance: 30,642; Referee: Marcel Bîrsan (Bucharest)

Cupa României 2017–18 winners

6th title
