= Alexandru Pelici =

Romanian footballer and manager (born 1974)

Personal information
- Full name: Alexandru Pelici-Drăghicescu
- Date of birth: 10 January 1974 (age 52)
- Place of birth: Timișoara, Romania
- Height: 1.87 m (6 ft 2 in)
- Positions: Defender; midfielder

Team information
- Current team: Minaur Baia Mare (manager)

Youth career
- 1987–1990: Progresul Timișoara

Senior career*
Years	Team	Apps	(Gls)
1990–1991	Progresul Timişoara	31	(4)
1991–1994	Electrica Timișoara	85	(7)
1994–1998	Politehnica Timișoara	103	(15)
1998–2001	CSM Reșița	93	(11)
2001–2002	Apulum Alba Iulia	22	(1)
Total		334	(38)

Managerial career
- 2002–2004: Apulum Alba Iulia (assistant)
- 2004–2005: Apulum Alba Iulia
- 2005–2006: FCM Reșița
- 2006–2007: FCM Reșița (assistant)
- 2007: FCM Reșița
- 2007–2008: Forex Brașov
- 2008–2009: Arieșul Turda
- 2009–2010: CSMȘ Reșița
- 2010–2012: Voința Sibiu
- 2012: FCM Târgu Mureș
- 2012: Voința Sibiu
- 2013: Râmnicu Vâlcea
- 2013: Metalul Reșița
- 2013: Brașov
- 2013–2014: Bihor Oradea
- 2014–2016: Râmnicu Vâlcea
- 2016–2017: Mioveni
- 2017–2018: Hermannstadt
- 2018–2020: Ripensia Timișoara
- 2020: CSM Reșița
- 2020–2022: Mioveni
- 2022–2023: Romania U19
- 2023: Argeș Pitești
- 2023–2025: Unirea Alba Iulia
- 2026–: Minaur Baia Mare
- * Club domestic league appearances and goals as of 07:59, 8 November 2024 (UTC)

Alexandru Pelici (born 10 January 1974) is a Romanian former professional footballer and currently a manager. He is in charge of Liga III club Minaur Baia Mare.

== Playing career ==
He started the player career in his hometown, Timișoara, at Progresul, then he moved at Electrica, eventually reaching in 1994 the most important team from Timișoara, Politehnica. He played for Poli until 1999 (93 matches and scored 3 goals) when he moved to another team from Banat, CSM Reșița. Pelici ended his career in 2002 at only 28 years old due to repeated knee injuries, his last club as a football player was Unirea Alba Iulia, at that time known as Apulum.

== Manager career ==
After the retirement Pelici started immediately his manager career as the assistant of Aurel Șunda, Unirea's manager at that time. At the end of the first season Unirea promoted to Divizia A for the first time in its history. At just 30 years old he was appointed the manager at Unirea Alba Iulia and many thought the team would relegated. It did not happen at all, and Unirea finished on 6th place in Divizia A, the best ranking in the history of the club. For 10 years he held the record of the youngest league coach. After this his career took place mostly at the level of the Liga II at clubs like: CSM Reșița, Forex Brașov, Arieșul Turda, Târgu Mureș, Voința Sibiu, Metalul Reșița, Bihor Oradea or Mioveni. The most he spent two years at Voința Sibiu and Râmnicu Vâlcea, with the first getting a promotion and a Liga I season. Pelici also had a quick crossing in Liga I at Brașov and currently he is the manager of Hermannstadt, the latest Sibiu born football club, being on a promotion spot after 21 rounds in the 2017–18 Liga II season.

== Honours ==
=== Player ===
Politehnica Timișoara

- Divizia B (1): 1994–95

=== Coach ===
Hermannstadt Sibiu

- Liga II runner-up: 2017–18
- Cupa Romaniei runner-up: 2017–18

== Personal life ==
Alexandru Pelici is the son of the popular folk singer Mariana Drăghicescu.
