= Daniel Tătar =

Romanian footballer

Personal information
- Full name: Daniel Vasile Tătar
- Date of birth: 27 October 1987 (age 39)
- Place of birth: Blaj, Romania
- Height: 1.77 m (5 ft 10 in)
- Positions: Left midfielder; second striker

Team information
- Current team: CIL Blaj
- Number: 17

Youth career
- 1992–2003: CȘS Blaj
- 2003–2005: Apulum Alba Iulia

Senior career*
| Years | Team | Apps | (Gls) |
| 2005–2008 | Unirea Alba Iulia | 59 | (3) |
| 2008–2012 | Voința Sibiu | 71 | (6) |
| 2013–2014 | Brașov | 23 | (2) |
| 2014 | Academica Argeș | 13 | (0) |
| 2015–2016 | Măgura Cisnădie | 0 | (0) |
| 2016–2020 | Hermannstadt | 79 | (5) |
| 2020–2022 | 1599 Șelimbăr | 31 | (8) |
| 2023 | Inter Sibiu | 9 | (0) |
| 2023– | CIL Blaj | 4 | (1) |

Managerial career
- 2023–: CIL Blaj
- * Club domestic league appearances and goals as of 11:28, 25 December 2024 (UTC)

Daniel Vasile Tătar (born 21 October 1987) is a Romanian footballer under contract with CIL Blaj. His first match in Liga I was played for CSU Voința Sibiu against Astra Ploiești.

== Honours ==
Hermannstadt

- Cupa României: Runner-up 2017–18

Viitorul Șelimbăr

- Liga III: 2020–21
