= Sergiu Popovici =

Romanian footballer

Personal information
- Full name: Sergiu Cristian Popovici
- Date of birth: 23 March 1993 (age 33)
- Place of birth: Făget, Romania
- Height: 1.80 m (5 ft 11 in)
- Positions: Left-back; left winger

Team information
- Current team: Dumbrăvița
- Number: 27

Youth career
- 2004–2011: LPS Banatul Timișoara

Senior career*
| Years | Team | Apps | (Gls) |
| 2011–2012 | Flacăra Făget | | |
| 2012–2014 | Vaslui | 17 | (0) |
| 2012 | → Voința Sibiu (loan) | 8 | (0) |
| 2014–2015 | Academica Argeş | 19 | (3) |
| 2015–2017 | Botoşani | 28 | (2) |
| 2017–2018 | Gaz Metan Mediaș | 32 | (1) |
| 2018 | Dinamo București | 13 | (0) |
| 2019–2020 | Hermannstadt | 13 | (1) |
| 2020–2021 | ASU Politehnica Timișoara | 22 | (2) |
| 2021–2022 | Murcia | 4 | (0) |
| 2022–2023 | Penya Independent | 17 | (1) |
| 2023–2025 | Sant Rafel | 46 | (9) |
| 2025– | Dumbrăvița | 35 | (2) |

International career
| 2011 | Romania U19 | 3 | (0) |
- * Club domestic league appearances and goals as of 31 October 2026

Sergiu Cristian Popovici (born 23 March 1993) is a Romanian professional footballer who plays as a left-back or a left winger for Liga II club Dumbrăvița

== Club career ==
On 19 March 2011, CS Flacăra Faget signed Sergiu Popovici from youth club LPS Banatul where he spent 7 years, before moving to Vaslui on 25 January 2012. Club leaders expressed excitement about his signing. On 17 August 2012, Sergiu Popovici, along with Răzvan Neagu and Valter Heil, was loaned out to Voința Sibiu, but returned to Vaslui a few months later when the club folded.

Popovici made his Liga I debut for Vaslui on 11 March 2013, in a 1–1 draw against Gloria Bistrița.

== International career ==
Popovici made his first appearance for the Romanian U-19 against Italy U-19 in UEFA U-19 Championship qualifying, coming on as a substitute in the 87th minute. The score ended 2–1 for Romania.
