= Răzvan Dâlbea =

Romanian footballer

Personal information
- Full name: Răzvan Adrian Dâlbea
- Date of birth: 8 October 1981 (age 45)
- Place of birth: Aiud, Romania
- Height: 1.83 m (6 ft 0 in)
- Position: Central midfielder

Youth career
- Metalul Aiud
- Universitatea Cluj
- –2001: Rapid București

Senior career*
Years	Team	Apps	(Gls)
2001	Electromagnetica București	1	(0)
2002–2005	Tricolorul Breaza	36	(2)
2005–2006	FC Sibiu	23	(1)
2006–2010	Unirea Alba Iulia	125	(25)
2011	Săgeata Năvodari	16	(1)
2011–2012	Voința Sibiu	28	(1)
2012	Târgu Mureș	8	(1)
2013–2014	Corona Brașov	37	(1)
2014–2015	Unirea Tărlungeni	31	(4)
2016	Râmnicu Vâlcea	12	(1)
2016–2021	Hermannstadt	140	(19)
Total		457	(55)

Managerial career
- 2017: Hermannstadt (assistant)
- * Club domestic league appearances and goals as of 08:31, 23 June 2021 (UTC)

Răzvan Adrian Dâlbea (born 8 October 1981) is a Romanian former footballer who played for teams such as Tricolorul Breaza, Unirea Alba Iulia, Voința Sibiu, Corona Brașov or FC Hermannstadt, among others.

== Career ==
Dâlbea was bought in 2006 by Unirea Alba Iulia from Tricolorul Breaza.

== Honours ==
Unirea Alba Iulia

- Liga II: 2008–09

Corona Brașov

- Liga II: 2012–13

FC Hermannstadt

- Liga III: 2016–17
- Cupa României: Runner-up 2017–18
