= Ștefan Blănaru =

Romanian footballer

Personal information
- Full name: Ștefan Miluță Blănaru
- Date of birth: 20 February 1989 (age 37)
- Place of birth: Moldova Nouă, Romania
- Height: 1.82 m (6 ft 0 in)
- Position: Forward

Team information
- Current team: Unirea Alba Iulia
- Number: 18

Youth career
- –2008: LPS Banatul Timișoara

Senior career*
Years	Team	Apps	(Gls)
2009–2011	Millenium Giarmata		
2011–2012	Luceafărul Felix	30	(2)
2013	Oșorhei		
2013–2014	Național Sebiș		
2014–2015	Olt Slatina	22	(4)
2015	Ripensia Timișoara	14	(6)
2016	Millenium Giarmata	14	(9)
2016–2017	Politehnica Timișoara	33	(16)
2017–2019	Hermannstadt	66	(14)
2019–2020	Petrolul Ploiești	16	(1)
2020	Turris Turnu Măgurele	12	(2)
2021–2022	Mioveni	56	(7)
2023	FC Brașov	1	(0)
2023–2024	Mioveni	25	(7)
2024–	Unirea Alba Iulia	0	(0)
- * Club domestic league appearances and goals as of 08:45, 8 November 2024 (UTC)

Ștefan Miluță Blănaru (born 20 February 1989) is a Romanian professional footballer who plays as a forward for Liga III club Unirea Alba Iulia.

== Career ==
Blănaru made his Liga I debut on 21 July 2018, at 29 years old, when he played for Hermannstadt, club that also made its debut in the top flight, against Sepsi Sfântu Gheorghe, scoring the only goal of the match. Until his debut in the Liga I, Ștefan Blănaru played for Liga II and Liga III clubs, such as: Luceafărul Oradea, Olt Slatina, ASU Politehnica or Ripensia Timișoara, among others.

== Honours ==
Hermannstadt

- Cupa României runner-up: 2017–18
