= Florin Acsinte =

Romanian footballer

Personal information
- Full name: Florin Dorin Acsinte
- Date of birth: 10 April 1987 (age 39)
- Place of birth: Botoșani, Romania
- Height: 1.78 m (5 ft 10 in)
- Position: Left-back

Team information
- Current team: Dante Botoșani (assistant)

Youth career
- –2005: Botoșani

Senior career*
Years	Team	Apps	(Gls)
2005–2015	Botoșani	237	(10)
2009–2010	→ Dinamo II București (loan)	13	(1)
2016	Pandurii Târgu Jiu	9	(0)
2016–2017	Voluntari	46	(0)
2018	Botoșani	11	(0)
2018–2019	Hermannstadt	6	(0)
Total		322	(11)

Managerial career
- 2021–2022: Botoșani (fitness coach)
- 2022–2023: Dante Botoșani (assistant)
- 2023: Oțelul Galați (Assistant)
- * Club domestic league appearances and goals as of 26 June 2019

Florin Dorin Acsinte (born 10 April 1987) is a former Romanian footballer who played as a left back. Currently he is the assistant coach of Romanian club Dante Botoșani.

== Career ==
After a number of impressive performances for the Dinamo București reserve team in his short loan spell, Acsinte was wished to get first-team experience but the two clubs couldn't reach an agreement on transfer fee.

== Personal life ==
He is a husband and father. Acsinte stated that he and his family sympathize with Steaua București.

== Honours ==
FC Botoșani

- Liga II: 2012–13

FC Voluntari

- Romanian Cup: 2016–17
- Romanian Supercup: 2017

Sporting positions
Preceded by Gabriel Vașvari	Botoșani captain 2014–16	Succeeded by Gabriel Vașvari
