= Alexandru Dandea =

Romanian footballer

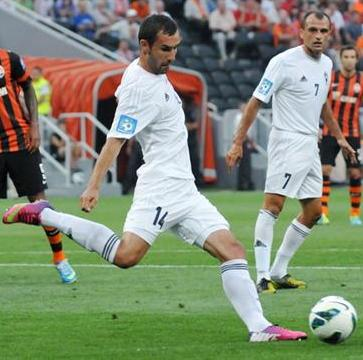

Personal information
- Full name: Alexandru Adrian Dandea
- Date of birth: 23 January 1988 (age 38)
- Place of birth: Drăgășani, Romania
- Height: 1.88 m (6 ft 2 in)
- Position: Centre back

Team information
- Current team: SCM Râmnicu Vâlcea
- Number: 30

Youth career
- 1993–2003: CSȘ CN Gib Mihăescu Drăgășani
- 2003–2006: CSM Râmnicu Vâlcea

Senior career*
Years	Team	Apps	(Gls)
2006–2011	CSM Râmnicu Vâlcea	90	(10)
2008–2009	→ Seso Câmpia Turzii (loan)	14	(1)
2012–2013	CS Turnu Severin	27	(3)
2013	Dinamo București	14	(0)
2013–2014	Hoverla	14	(0)
2015	Metalul Reșița	10	(1)
2015–2018	Astra Giurgiu	44	(4)
2018–2019	Hermannstadt	37	(2)
2019–2020	Astra Giurgiu	19	(0)
2020–2022	Rapid București	47	(3)
2022	1599 Șelimbăr	14	(0)
2023	Minaur Baia Mare	7	(0)
2023	FC Brașov	0	(0)
2023–2024	Mioveni	9	(2)
2024	Gloria Buzău	15	(1)
2024–	SCM Râmnicu Vâlcea	9	(2)
- * Club domestic league appearances and goals as of 08:28, 12 November 2024 (UTC)

Alexandru Adrian Dandea (born 23 January 1988) is a Romanian footballer who plays as a centre-back for Liga II club SCM Râmnicu Vâlcea, which he captains.

== Honours ==
Astra Giurgiu

- Liga I: 2015–16
- Cupa României runner-up: 2016–17, 2018–19
- Supercupa României: 2016
