= Roland Stănescu =

Romanian football player (1990–2022)

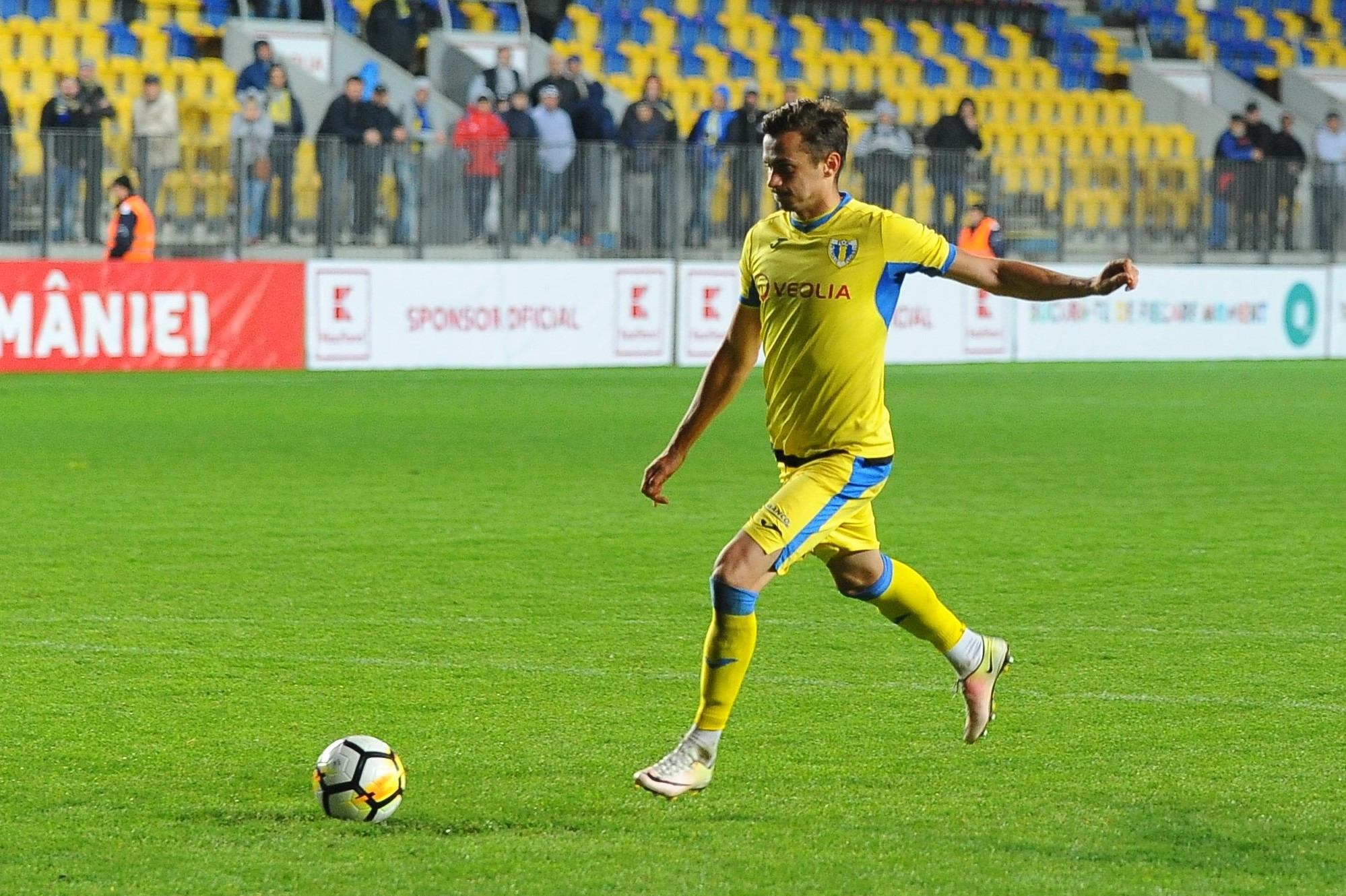

Personal information
- Full name: Roland Dedius Stănescu
- Date of birth: 19 April 1990
- Place of birth: Bucharest, Romania
- Date of death: 2 July 2022 (aged 32)
- Place of death: Voluntari, Romania
- Height: 1.68 m (5 ft 6 in)
- Position: Midfielder

Senior career*
Years	Team	Apps	(Gls)
2008–2010	Juventus București		
2011–2013	FC Arges	20	(1)
2013–2014	Minerul Motru	7	(0)
2014–2015	CS Ştefăneşti		
2016	CS Voința Saelele		
2016	CS Baloteşti	6	(0)
2017–2018	ACS Petrolul 52 Ploieşti	8	(10)
2018–2019	Dacia Unirea Brăila	2	(0)
- * Club domestic league appearances and goals

Roland Dedius Stănescu (19 April 1990 – 2 July 2022) was a Romanian footballer who played as a midfielder. He played mostly in the Liga II for Dacia Unirea Braila, CS Balotești, CS Minerul Motru and FC Argeș Pitești, Liga III for SC Juventus București.

Stănescu died by suicide on 2 July 2022, jumping from the fourth floor of an apartment building.
