= Petrișor Petrescu =

Romanian footballer

Personal information
- Full name: Petrișor Ionuț Petrescu
- Date of birth: 29 June 1993 (age 33)
- Place of birth: Sibiu, Romania
- Height: 1.76 m (5 ft 9 in)
- Position: Midfielder

Team information
- Current team: 1599 Șelimbăr
- Number: 7

Youth career
- FC Sibiu
- –2011: Voința Sibiu

Senior career*
Years	Team	Apps	(Gls)
2011–2013	Voința Sibiu	7	(0)
2013–2016	Măgura Cisnădie	67	(11)
2016–2020	Hermannstadt	124	(17)
2020–2021	Academica Clinceni	10	(1)
2021–2024	Hermannstadt	90	(9)
2024	→ Argeș Pitești (loan)	10	(2)
2024–2025	Argeș Pitești	14	(1)
2025	→ 1599 Șelimbăr (loan)	9	(2)
2025–	1599 Șelimbăr	38	(3)
- * Club domestic league appearances and goals as of 31 October 2026

Petrișor Ionuț Petrescu (born 29 June 1993) is a Romanian professional footballer who plays as a midfielder for Liga II club 1599 Șelimbăr.

== Honours ==
Măgura Cisnădie

- Liga IV – Sibiu County: 2013–14

Hermannstadt

- Liga III: 2016–17
- Cupa României runner-up: 2017–18
