= Mihai Roman (footballer, born 1992) =

Romanian footballer (born 1992)

Personal information
- Full name: Mihai Alexandru Roman
- Date of birth: 31 May 1992 (age 34)
- Place of birth: Craiova, Romania
- Height: 1.90 m (6 ft 3 in)
- Position: Forward

Team information
- Current team: Voluntari
- Number: 7

Youth career
- 2000–2009: FC Universitatea Craiova

Senior career*
Years	Team	Apps	(Gls)
2009–2011	FC Universitatea Craiova	8	(0)
2011–2014	Petrolul Ploiești	15	(0)
2012	→ Universitatea Cluj (loan)	1	(0)
2013	→ CS Turnu Severin (loan)	12	(3)
2013–2014	→ Săgeata Năvodari (loan)	21	(3)
2014–2015	Pandurii Târgu Jiu	41	(20)
2015–2017	NEC	13	(1)
2016–2017	→ Maccabi Petah Tikva (loan)	35	(7)
2017–2022	Universitatea Craiova	32	(3)
2018	→ ACS Poli Timișoara (loan)	13	(1)
2018–2019	→ Botoșani (loan)	37	(9)
2022–2023	Botoșani	55	(15)
2023–2024	Petrolul Ploiești	10	(0)
2024	Neftchi Fergana	9	(0)
2024–2026	Argeș Pitești	27	(6)
2026	→ Voluntari (loan)	12	(5)
2026–	Voluntari	12	(2)

International career
2011	Romania U19	3	(0)
2012–2013	Romania U21	6	(2)
2014–2015	Romania	2	(0)
- * Club domestic league appearances and goals as of 2 November 2026

Mihai Alexandru Roman (Romanian pronunciation: [miˈhaj alekˈsandru ˈroman]; born 31 May 1992) is a Romanian professional footballer who plays as a forward for Liga I club Voluntari.

== International career ==
Roman represented the Romania national under-19 team at the 2011 UEFA European Championship. On 10 September 2013, he scored twice for the under-21 side in a match against Montenegro.

== Career statistics ==
=== Club ===
As of 2 November 2026

Appearances and goals by club, season and competition
Club	Season	League			National cup (Note: Includes Cupa României, KNVB Beker, Israel State Cup, Uzbekistan Cup)		Continental		Other		Total	
Club	Season	Division	Apps	Goals	Apps	Goals	Apps	Goals	Apps	Goals	Apps	Goals
FC Universitatea Craiova	2009–10	Liga I	2	0	—		—		—		2	0
FC Universitatea Craiova	2010–11	Liga I	6	0	1	1	—		—		7	1
FC Universitatea Craiova	Total		8	0	1	1	—		—		9	1
Petrolul Ploiești	2011–12	Liga I	15	0	3	0	—		—		18	0
Petrolul Ploiești	2012–13	Liga I	0	0	—		—		—		0	0
Petrolul Ploiești	Total		15	0	3	0	—		—		18	0
Universitatea Cluj (loan)	2012–13	Liga I	1	0	1	0	—		—		2	0
CS Turnu Severin (loan)	2012–13	Liga I	12	3	—		—		—		12	3
Săgeata Năvodari (loan)	2013–14	Liga I	21	3	0	0	—		—		21	3
Pandurii Târgu Jiu	2014–15	Liga I	32	16	2	0	—		4 (Note: Appearances in Cupa Ligii)	1	38	17
Pandurii Târgu Jiu	2015–16	Liga I	9	4	—		—		—		9	4
Pandurii Târgu Jiu	Total		41	20	2	0	—		4	1	47	21
NEC	2015–16	Eredivisie	13	1	1	0	—		—		14	1
Maccabi Petah Tikva (loan)	2016–17	Israeli Premier League	35	7	3	1	—		—		38	8
Universitatea Craiova	2017–18	Liga I	17	0	2	0	2 (Note: Appearances in UEFA Europa League)	0	—		21	0
Universitatea Craiova	2019–20	Liga I	15	3	0	0	5	1	—		20	4
Universitatea Craiova	2020–21	Liga I	0	0	0	0	0	0	—		0	0
Universitatea Craiova	2021–22	Liga I	0	0	1	0	0	0	0	0	1	0
Universitatea Craiova	Total		32	3	3	0	7	1	0	0	42	4
ACS Poli Timișoara (loan)	2017–18	Liga I	13	1	—		—		—		13	1
Botoșani (loan)	2018–19	Liga I	37	9	0	0	—		—		37	9
Botoșani	2021–22	Liga I	18	9	—		—		1 (Note: Appearance in Liga I European play-offs)	0	19	9
Botoșani	2022–23	Liga I	32	5	2	0	—		—		34	5
Botoșani	2023–24	Liga I	5	1	—		—		—		5	1
Botoșani	Total		55	15	2	0	—		1	0	58	15
Petrolul Ploiești (loan)	2023–24	Liga I	10	0	3	2	—		—		13	2
Neftchi Fergana	2024	Liga I	9	0	4	1	—		—		13	1
Argeș Pitești	2024–25	Liga II	26	6	2	1	—		—		28	7
Argeș Pitești	2025–26	Liga I	1	0	0	0	—		—		1	0
Argeș Pitești	Total		27	6	2	1	—		—		29	7
Voluntari (loan)	2025–26	Liga II	12	5	—		—		2 (Note: Appearances in Liga I promotion/relegation play-offs)	1	14	6
Voluntari	2026–27	Liga I	12	2	3	0	—		—		15	2
Voluntari	Total		24	7	3	0	—		2	1	29	80
Career total			353	75	28	6	7	1	7	2	395	84

=== International ===
Appearances and goals by national team and year
National team	Year	Apps	Goals
Romania	2015	2	0
Total		2	0

== Honours ==
Pandurii Târgu Jiu

- Cupa Ligii runner-up: 2014–15

Universitatea Craiova

- Cupa României: 2020–21
- Supercupa României: 2021

Argeș Pitești

- Liga II: 2024–25
