= Botoșani Municipal Stadium =

Stadium in Botoșani, Romania

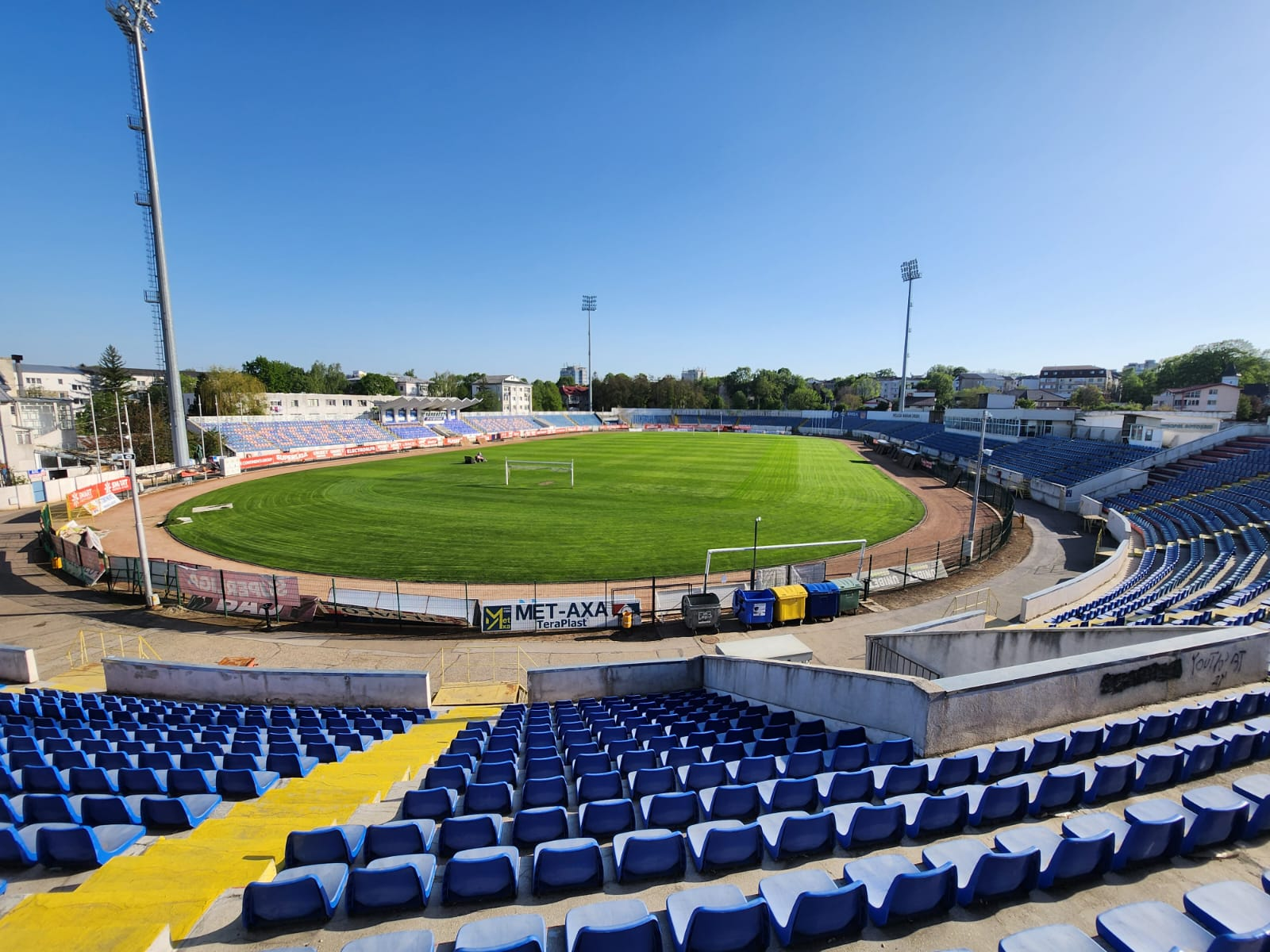
- Botoșani Municipal Stadium in 2025
- Interactive map of Botoșani Municipal Stadium
- Location: Botoşani, Romania
- Coordinates: 47.7483°N 26.6519°E
- Owner: Municipality of Botoşani
- Operator: FC Botoșani
- Capacity: 7,782 seated
- Surface: Grass
- Field size: 105 m × 68 m (344 ft × 223 ft)

Construction
- Renovated: 2008, 2009, 2013
- Expanded: 2013

Tenants
- CS Botoșani (1973–1993); Unirea Botoşani (1998–2000); FC Botoșani (2001–Present)

Website
- dsabotosani.ro

The Botoșani Municipal Stadium is a multi-use stadium in Botoşani, Romania. It is currently used mostly for football and rugby union matches, being the home ground of FC Botoșani. The stadium was expanded in 2013 and holds 7,782 people.

== Events ==
=== Association football ===
International football matches
Date	Competition	Home	Away	Score	Attendance
13 October 2009	2011 UEFA Euro U-21 qualification	Romania	Faroe Islands	3–0	5,600
3 September 2010	2011 UEFA Euro U-21 qualification	Romania	Russia	3–0	2,000
12 October 2010	2011 UEFA Euro U-21 qualification	Romania	England	0–0	6,400

=== Association football ===
International football clubs matches
Date	Competition	Home	Away	Score	Attendance
2 July 2015	UEFA Europa League	(Romania) Botoșani	(Georgia (country)) Tskhinvali	1–1	6,031
23 July 2015	UEFA Europa League	(Romania) Botoșani	(Poland) Legia Warsaw	0–3	5,353
