= Sibiu Municipal Stadium (1927) =

Multi-purpose stadium in Romania

Stadionul Municipal
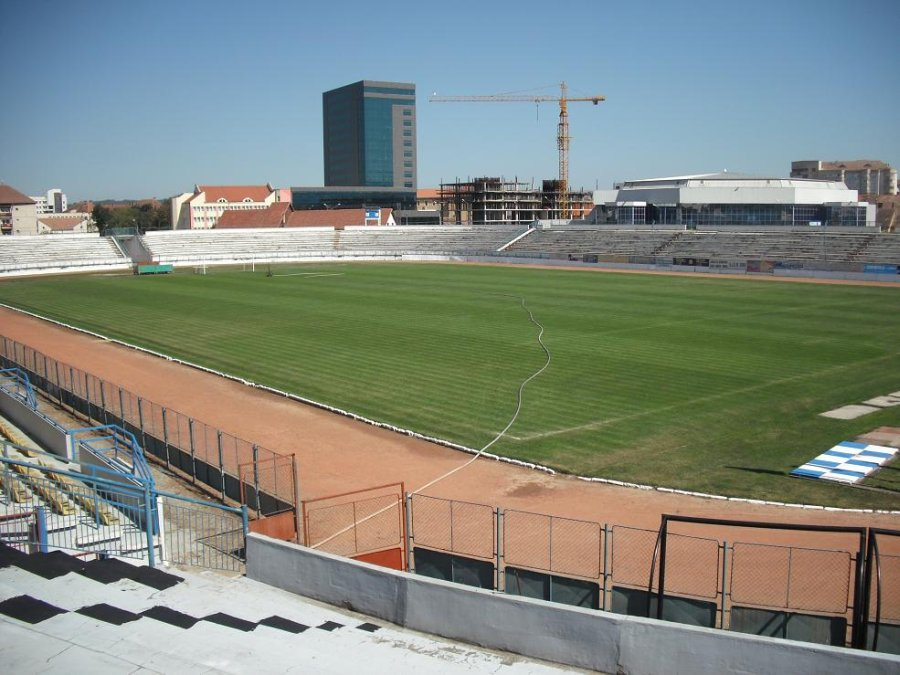
- The stadium before the demolition
- Interactive map of Stadionul Municipal
- Address: 1-3 Mihai Eminescu Alley
- Location: Sibiu, Romania
- Coordinates: 45°46′59.9″N 24°8′37.6″E
- Owner: Municipality of Sibiu
- Operator: Hermannstadt
- Capacity: 14,200
- Surface: Grass

Construction
- Opened: 1927; 99 years ago
- Demolished: 2018–2020; 6 years ago

Tenants
- Societatea Gimnastică Sibiu (1927–1945); Șoimii Sibiu (1927–1986); Inter Sibiu (1986–2000); FC Sibiu (2003–2007); Voinţa Sibiu (2009–2012); Hermannstadt (2015–2020)

The original Sibiu Municipal Stadium was a multi-purpose stadium in Sibiu, Romania, which stood on the same site occupied by its successor.

== See also ==
- List of football stadiums in Romania
