= FC Hermannstadt =

Association football club in Sibiu

Hermannstadt
- Full name: Asociația Fotbal Club Hermannstadt
- Nicknames: Roș-negrii (The Red and Blacks); Sibienii (The Sibiu People)
- Founded: 29 July 2015; 11 years ago
- Dissolved: 1 August 2026
- Ground: Municipal
- Capacity: 12,363
- 2025–26: Liga I, 14th of 16 (relegated via play-offs)

Asociația Fotbal Club Hermannstadt (German pronunciation: [ˈhɛʁmanʃtat]), commonly known as FC Hermannstadt, Hermannstadt, or familiarly as Sibiu (Romanian pronunciation: [siˈbiw]), was a Romanian professional football club based in the city of Sibiu, Sibiu County.

The team was founded in 2015 and entered the fourth division, with Hermannstadt being the equivalent of the city's name in the standard German language (i.e. Hochdeutsch). Nicknamed Roș-negrii ("the Red-Blacks"), they achieved successive promotions and reached the Liga I, the top tier of the Romanian league system, in 2018.

That same year, Hermannstadt also reached the final of Cupa României, which they lost 0–2 to Universitatea Craiova. They repeated this achievement in 2025, but again finished as runners-up after a narrow 2–3 defeat to CFR Cluj.

== History ==
AFC Hermannstadt was founded in 2015 to continue the long tradition of football in the city of Sibiu, started in 1913 by Șoimii Sibiu and continued through other teams such as Societatea Gimnastică Sibiu (German: Hermannstädter Turnverein - HTV), Inter Sibiu, FC Sibiu, or Voința Sibiu. Even if Hermannstadt is not a "legal" successor to any of these clubs, it can be considered a moral one, as it has been the only representative of Sibiu in the first three leagues. Hermannstadt is the equivalent of the city's name in the German language, which has sometimes stirred controversy.

Immediately after the 2015 founding, the club was enrolled in the Liga IV. It finished first in the league table and subsequently qualified for the Liga III promotion play-offs. Hermannstadt won the phase without major difficulties, after 6–1 on aggregate against the champion of Gorj County, Gilortul Târgu Cărbunești. Sibienii were also winners of the Liga III – Seria V in the next season and promoted to the Liga II, the second level of the Romanian league system.

Hermannstadt played its first Liga II match on 5 August 2017, a 3–0 home victory over CS Balotești. It finished the campaign as runner-up, and thus achieved promotion to the Liga I after only three years of existence. The club also managed a notable performance in the Cupa României, being the first in 36 years to reach the final despite not playing in the top flight. Hermannstadt upset four Liga I teams en route to the last game of the competition—Voluntari, Juventus București, FCSB and county rival Gaz Metan Mediaș, respectively. It lost the final 0–2 to Universitatea Craiova, on 27 May 2018.

On 21 July 2018, Hermannstadt won its first ever Liga I match after Ștefan Blănaru scored the only goal of the opening fixture against Sepsi OSK.

== Ground ==
Hermannstadt's home ground, Stadionul Municipal, was originally built in 1927 and served as the home venue for several other teams from the city. In 2018, it was demolished to make way for a modern version, prompting Hermannstadt to temporarily relocate to the Stadionul Gaz Metan in Mediaș. The new stadium was inaugurated in 2022.

== Support ==
In its beginnings, Hermannstadt enjoyed the interest of about 4,000 fans. The team also has an ultras group, named D'acii, which appeared for the first time at a match against ASU Politehnica Timișoara in September 2017. Their name is a pun on the words dacii ("the Dacians") and d-aci, a contraction of de aici (meaning "from here").

== Rivalries ==
Hermannstadt had a local rivalry with Gaz Metan Mediaș, referred to as the "Derby of Sibiu County".

== Honours ==
=== Domestic ===
==== Leagues ====
- Liga II
  - Runners-up (2): 2017–18, 2021–22
- Liga III
  - Winners (1): 2016–17
- Liga IV – Sibiu County
  - Winners (1): 2015–16

==== Cups ====
- Cupa României
  - Runners-up (2): 2017–18, 2024–25

== Notable former players ==
The footballers enlisted below have had international cap(s) for their respective countries at junior and/or senior level and/or significant caps for FC Hermannstadt.

Romania

- (Romania) Dragoș Albu
- (Romania) Florin Bejan
- (Romania) Claudiu Belu
- (Romania) Ciprian Biceanu
- (Romania) Ștefan Blănaru
- (Romania) Sergiu Buș
- (Romania) Mihai Butean
- (Romania) Cătălin Căbuz
- (Romania) Aurelian Chițu
- (Romania) Andrei Cordea
- (Romania) Kevin Ciubotaru
- (Romania) Alexandru Curtean
- (Romania) Răzvan Dâlbea
- (Romania) Alexandru Dandea
- (Romania) Lucian Dumitriu
- (Romania) Valerică Găman
- (Romania) Gabriel Iancu
- (Romania) David Lazar
- (Romania) Srdjan Luchin
- (Romania) Alexandru Mățel
- (Romania) Ionuț Năstăsie
- (Romania) Cristian Neguț
- (Romania) Raul Opruț
- (Romania) Alexandru Oroian
- (Romania) Petrișor Petrescu
- (Romania) Alexandru Răuță
- (Romania) Bogdan Rusu
- (Romania) Ianis Stoica
- (Romania) Ionuț Stoica
- (Romania) Daniel Tătar

Brazil

- (Brazil) Jô Santos
- (Brazil) Romário Pires

Bulgaria

- (Bulgaria) Plamen Iliev
- (Bulgaria) Antoni Ivanov

Cyprus

- (Cyprus) Andreas Karo

Congo

- (Republic of the Congo) Juvhel Tsoumou

Croatia

- (Croatia) Gabriel Debeljuh
- (Croatia) Karlo Letica

Côte d'Ivoire

- (Ivory Coast) Ousmane Viera

Ghana

- (Ghana) Baba Alhassan
- (Ghana) Nana Antwi

Italy

- (Italy) Alessandro Murgia

Japan

- (Japan) Sota Mino

Luxembourg

- (Luxembourg) Vahid Selimović

Portugal

- (Portugal) Cristiano
- (Portugal) David Caiado
- (Portugal) Tiago Gonçalves
- (Portugal) Yazalde

Switzerland

- (Switzerland) Goran Karanović

== Notable former managers ==
- (Spain) Rubén Albés
- (Romania) Liviu Ciobotariu
- (Romania) Costel Enache
- (Romania) Marius Măldărășanu
- (Hungary) (Romania) Vasile Miriuță
- (Romania) Dorinel Munteanu
- (Romania) Eugen Neagoe
- (Romania) Alexandru Pelici

== Statistics and records ==
=== League history ===
| Season | Tier | Division | Place | Notes | National Cup |
|---|---|---|---|---|---|
| 2025–26 | Liga I | 1 | 14th | Relegated | Quarter-finals |
| 2024–25 | Liga I | 1 | 7th | | Final |
| 2023–24 | Liga I | 1 | 9th | | Quarter-finals |
| 2022–23 | Liga I | 1 | 11th | | Quarter-finals |
| 2021–22 | Liga II | 2 | 2nd | Promoted | Round of 16 |
| 2020–21 | Liga I | 1 | 14th | Relegated | Round of 32 |

| Season | Tier | Division | Place | Notes | National Cup |
|---|---|---|---|---|---|
| 2019–20 | Liga I | 1 | 8th | | Quarter Finals |
| 2018–19 | Liga I | 1 | 12th | Play-off winner | Quarter-finals |
| 2017–18 | Liga II | 2 | 2nd | Promoted | Final |
| 2016–17 | Liga III (Seria V) | 3 | 1st | Promoted | County Phase |
| 2015–16 | Liga IV (SB) | 4 | 1st | Promoted | |
