= Gaz Metan Stadium (Mediaș) =

Football stadium in Mediaş, Romania

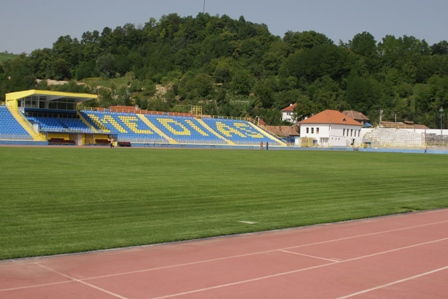
- The venue before expansion
- Interactive map of Gaz Metan Stadium
- Address: Piaţa Regele Ferdinand, nr. 12
- Location: Mediaş, Romania
- Coordinates: 46°10′21.30″N 24°21′09.90″E
- Owner: Transgaz
- Operator: ACS Mediaș
- Capacity: 7,814 seated
- Surface: Grass
- Field size: 105 x 68m

Construction
- Opened: 1950
- Renovated: 2010

Tenants
- Gaz Metan Mediaş (1950−2022); ACS Mediaș (2022−present)

The Gaz Metan Stadium is a multi-purpose stadium in Mediaş, Romania. It is frequently used for football and was the home ground of Gaz Metan Mediaş.

== Events ==
=== Association football ===
International football clubs matches
Date	Competition	Home	Away	Score	Attendance
21 July 2011	UEFA Europa League	(Romania) Gaz Metan	(Finland) KuPS	2 - 0	6,000
4 August 2011	UEFA Europa League	(Romania) Gaz Metan	(Germany) Mainz	1 - 1 (a.e.t.) (4-3 p)	5,600
6 September 2011	2013 UEFA Euro U-21 qualification	Romania	Latvia	2 - 0	3,000
29 March 2016	2017 UEFA Euro U-21 qualification	Romania	Wales	2 - 1	1,722
2 September 2016	2017 UEFA Euro U-21 qualification	Romania	Luxembourg	4 - 0	1,957

== See also ==
- List of football stadiums in Romania
