= CSU Voința Sibiu =

Romanian football club

Voința Sibiu
- Full name: Clubul Sportiv Universitar Voința Sibiu
- Short name: Voința Sibiu
- Founded: 1965; 61 years ago
- Dissolved: 2012; 14 years ago
- Ground: Municipal
- Capacity: 14,200
- Website: http://www.vointasibiu.ro
Home colours	Away colours

CSU Voința Sibiu was a Romanian football team from Sibiu, Sibiu County, founded in 1965 and dissolved in the autumn of 2012. In the summer of 2007, to continue the football tradition of Sibiu after the dissolution of Inter Sibiu in 2001 and FC Sibiu in 2007, the Romanian businessman Ioan Hămbășan took control over the club managed three consecutive promotions from Liga IV to Liga I. It played for one season in Romania's top football league, in the 2011–12 Liga I.

== History ==
Voința Sibiu was founded in 1965 and was subordinated to ATCOM (Territorial Association of Craft Cooperative Organizations). For most of the club's history, Voința Sibiu or Metalul Voința Sibiu evolved in the district, regional or county championship.

Voința had an excellent start in the 2010–11 Romanian Cup and qualified for the Round of 32, where they faced, Liga I club and fierce rival from the Sibiu County, Gaz Metan Mediaş. On September 21, 2010, Voința produced a big surprise and defeated Gaz Metan, at Sibiu, with a score of 3–1 after the extra time, after the first 90 minutes had ended 1–1, where guests played with the reserves and players from the second team. In the Round of 16 they were defeated only after the penalty shoutout by the renowned FC Timişoara.

Next season, Gaz Metan took its revenge in the championship. They have defeated Voința in both matches: home, in Mediaș, with 3–0, then away, in Sibiu, easily, 2–0.

Voința finished 1st the first half of the 2010–11 Liga II season, and had a great chance to promote for the first time in history to the Liga I.

Voința finished 4th its first Liga II season in history, but all was not lost, because FRF decided that a play-off round will be played between Săgeata Năvodari and Voința Sibiu for the last vacant place in the 2011–12 Liga I.

After 0–0 at Năvodari and a 2–0 win at Sibiu, Voința promoted for the very first time in history to the Liga I. Sibiu is represented at the highest football level after 15 years of absence, Inter last playing there in the 1995–96 Divizia A. In Liga 1, they achieved their first point in the first round, 1–1 home with Steaua Bucharest and their first win at Ploiești, 1–0 with Astra.

Voința relegated after only one season of top football, finishing 16th in the table, with 32 points.

After only 11 rounds played in the 2012–13 Liga II Voința withdrew from the championship, because of immense debts.

== Honours ==
- Liga III
  - Winners (1): 2009–10
- Liga IV – Sibiu County
  - Winners (2): 1988–89, 2008–09

== Former managers ==
- (Romania) Marius Baciu (2009)
