= 2019–20 FCSB season =

FCSB
2019–20 season
- President: Valeriu Argăseală
- Manager: Bogdan Andone (until 2 August); Vergil Andronache (until 23 August); Bogdan Vintilă (from 23 August)
- Stadium: Arena Națională
- Liga I: 5th
- Cupa României: Winners
- Europa League: Play-off round
- Top goalscorer: League: Florinel Coman (11); All: Florinel Coman (14)
- Highest home attendance: 30,235 vs Dinamo București (5 October 2019, Liga I)
- Lowest home attendance: 0^{1}
- Average home league attendance: 6,502
Home colours	Away colours

The 2019–20 season was FCSB's 72nd season since its founding in 1947.

== Previous season positions ==
	Competition	Position
(European Union)	UEFA Europa League	Play-off round
(Romania)	Liga I	2nd
(Romania)	Cupa României	Round of 16

== Season overview ==
=== June ===
On 5 June, FCSB has appointed Bogdan Andone as the new Head Coach of the team. He was presented in a press conference alongside the owner of the club, Gigi Becali and the Sports Director, Mihai Stoica. On the same day, FCSB announced that the club had reached an agreement with Florentin Matei for the termination of his contract.

On 22 June, FCSB defeated Colțea Brașov 7–0 in a pre-season friendly. Oaidă, the most recent transfer, debuted in the friendly match and scored the first goal for the Roș-albaștrii.

On 25 June, FCSB defeated SR Brașov 0–4 in a pre-season friendly. Planić opened the goal series in the 4th minute, Tănase notched two goals in front of over 4,000 fans.

On 28 June, FCSB drew Viitorul Constanța 3–3 in a pre-season friendly in Brașov. Hora netted a spectacular goal in the top corner in the first half, while Oaidă scored twice in the second part of the game.

On 30 June, FCSB and Lecce reached an agreement for the transfer of Romario Benzar to the Italian club for a fee of €2 million.

=== July ===
On 1 July, FCSB announced that Filipe Teixeira's contract expired; he was not resigned and was therefore released. In addition to this, it was announced that youngsters Gabriel Simion and Ianis Stoica have been loaned to Astra Giurgiu, respectively Petrolul Ploiești for the 2019–2020 season.

On 2 July, the club cancelled the contract of Adrian Stoian.

On 4 July, FCSB defeated CS Mioveni 0–1 in a pre-season friendly. Tănase scored in the 57th minute from the penalty spot.

On 5 July, FCSB and Gazişehir Gaziantep reached an agreement for the transfer of Júnior Morais to the Turkish club for a fee of €600,000.

On 11 July, FCSB announced that they have reached an agreement with Viitorul Constanța for the transfer of Ionuț Vînă for €750,000 plus a 10% percentage of any future transfer fee. The player signed a five-year contract and his buyout clause was set at €20 million.

On the same day, FCSB defeated Milsami Orhei 2–0 in their first official and Europa League game of the season. Tănase notched two goals. Additionally, in this match, the team also presented their new official Nike home kit for the next two seasons.

On 14 July, FCSB defeated Hermannstadt 4–3 in the first league match of the season. Coman, Hora, Man and Nedelcu scored one goal each in the spectacular win. The match also saw an official debut from Vînă.

On 15 July, the club announced that they have signed the Portuguese player Thierry Moutinho and was given the number 14 jersey.

On 16 July, FCSB announced that they have signed the Portuguese player Diogo Salomão who had played for the cross-town rivals Dinamo București. He signed for one season and was given the number 24 jersey.

On 18 July, FCSB defeated Milsami Orhei 1–2 in the second leg of the first qualifying round. Dumitru and Oaidă scored for the team. Moreover, that day the owner of the club announced that they had reached an agreement with Academica Clinceni for the transfer of Adrian Șut who will be joining the club from 1 July 2020 for an undisclosed fee.

On 22 July, FCSB drew Sepsi Sfântu Gheorghe 0–0. The match saw an official debut from Salomão.

On 25 July, FCSB defeated Alashkert 0–3. Tănase, Cristea and Coman scored for the win, making the qualification in the third qualifying round of Europa League lighter.

On 29 July, FCSB lost to Botoșani 0–2. It represents the first defeat of the season and the first defeat all-time to Botoșani, after 14 clashes between the clubs.

On 31 July, FCSB announced that they have reached an agreement with Politehnica Iași for the transfer of Ionuț Panțîru for €200,000 plus a 10% percentage of any future transfer fee. The 23 years old defender has signed a 5-year deal and will wear shirt number 3.

On 31 July, the club also announced that they have reached an agreement with Minaur Baia Mare for the transfer of youngster Sorin Șerban for €100,000 plus a 15% percentage of any future transfer fee. The 19 years old defender has signed a 5 years contract and will wear shirt number 22.

=== August ===
On 1 August, FCSB announced that they have signed the Polish striker Łukasz Gikiewicz and was given the number 27 jersey. Additionally, on the same day, the club announced that they had reached an agreement with Fitness Coach Marian Lupu for the termination of his contract after two years and a half, due to the large number of injuries during the start of the season.

On 1 August, FCSB lost to Alashkert 2–3, but qualified further due to the first leg's result. Tănase scored in the 10' minute but after Bălașa made a penalty and was sent off in the 27' minute, Alaskert managed to score 3 goals. Coman scored for the safety of qualification in the second half. It represents the second defeat in a row, with poor performances, especially due to the large number of injuries.

On 2 August, FCSB announced that they have reached an agreement with Botoșani for the transfer of Aristidis Soiledis for a fee of €75,000. The player signed for one year and will wear the shirt number 18. Moreover, that day FCSB and the Head Coach Bogdan Andone have reached an agreement to terminate the contract after the poor performances in the last 3 games.

On 4 August, the club announced that they have reached an agreement with Gaz Metan Mediaș for the transfer of right-back Valentin Crețu by triggering his buyout clause of €125,000. The 30 years old defender signed a two-year contract and was given the number 2 jersey.

== Players ==
=== First team squad ===
N	Pos.	Nat.	Name	Age	EU	Since	App	Goals	Ends	Transfer fee	Notes
2	DF	(Romania)	Valentin Crețu	37	EU	2019	26	0	2021	€125k	
3	DF	(Romania)	Ionuț Panțîru	30	EU	2019	24	1	2022	€200k	
4	DF	(Romania)	George Miron	31	EU	2020	3	1	2022	Free	
6	MF	(Romania)	Dragoș Nedelcu	29	EU	2017	69	2	2022	€2.13M	
7	FW	(Romania)	Florinel Coman (4th captain)	28	EU	2017	103	30	2022	€2.65M	
8	MF	(Romania)	Lucian Filip (vice-captain)	35	EU	2009	179	7	2021	Youth system	
10	FW	(Romania)	Florin Tănase (captain)	31	EU	2016	146	36	2021	€1.5M	
11	MF	(Romania)	Olimpiu Moruțan	27	EU	2018	55	5	2023	€700k	
12	GK	(Romania)	Toma Niga	28	EU	2017	0	0	2022	€30k	
15	DF	(Serbia)	Marko Momčilović	38	Non-EU	2016	96	9	2019	€250k	
16	DF	(Serbia)	Bogdan Planić	34	Non-EU	2017	91	1	2021	€300k	
17	DF	(Romania)	Iulian Cristea	31	EU	2019	41	2	2023	€150k	
18	DF	(Greece)	Aristidis Soiledis	35	EU	2019	19	1	2020	€75k	
19	FW	(Romania)	Adrian Petre	28	EU	2020	3	0	2024	€800k	
20	MF	(Romania)	Ionuț Vînă	31	EU	2019	25	0	2024	€750k	
23	MF	(Romania)	Ovidiu Popescu (3rd captain)	32	EU	2016	112	3	2022	€200k	
25	MF	(Romania)	Ovidiu Perianu	24	EU	2019	2	0	2024	Youth system	
26	MF	(Romania)	Răzvan Oaidă	28	EU	2019	30	4	2024	€700k	
27	MF	(Romania)	Darius Olaru	28	EU	2020	8	2	2024	€600k	
34	GK	(Romania)	Cristian Bălgrădean	38	EU	2018	73	0	2020	€50k	
77	DF	(Romania)	Alexandru Stan	37	EU	2018	14	0	2021	€300k	
88	FW	(Romania)	Adrian Popa	37	EU	2019	227	27	2020	Free	
92	FW	(Romania)	Romeo Niță	23	EU	2019	1	0	2024	Youth system	
98	FW	(Romania)	Dennis Man	27	EU	2016	119	30	2022	€500k	
99	GK	(Romania)	Andrei Vlad	27	EU	2017	34	0	2023	€400k	

- Last updated: 9 March 2020
- Source: FCSB.ro, Players in / out, Wikipedia players' articles

=== Transfers ===
==== In ====
No.	Pos.	Nat.	Name	Age	EU	Moving from	Type	Transfer window	Ends	Transfer fee	Source
—	DF	(Romania)	Gabriel Simion	21	EU	Dunărea Călărași	Loan return	Summer	2021	—	
—	FW	(Romania)	Daniel Benzar	21	EU	Dunărea Călărași	Loan return	Summer	2022	—	
—	MF	(Romania)	Vlad Mihalcea	20	EU	Academica Clinceni	Loan return	Summer	2021	—	
—	FW	(Romania)	Ianis Stoica	16	EU	Dunărea Călărași	Loan return	Summer	2023	—	
—	FW	(Romania)	Cristian Dumitru	17	EU	Academica Clinceni	Loan return	Summer	2023	—	
12	GK	(Romania)	Toma Niga	21	EU	Hermannstadt	Loan return	Summer	2022	—	
70	DF	(Romania)	Claudiu Belu	25	EU	Astra Giurgiu	Transfer	Summer	2024	Free	
26	MF	(Romania)	Răzvan Oaidă	21	EU	Botoșani	Transfer	Summer	2024	€700,000	fcsb.ro
20	MF	(Romania)	Ionuț Vînă	24	EU	Viitorul Constanța	Transfer	Summer	2024	€750,000	fcsb.ro
14	MF	(Switzerland) (Portugal)	Thierry Moutinho	28	EU	CFR Cluj	Transfer	Summer	2020	Free	fcsb.ro
24	FW	(Portugal)	Diogo Salomão	30	EU	Al-Hazem (Saudi Arabia)	Transfer	Summer	2020	Free	fcsb.ro
—	MF	(Romania)	Adrian Șut	20	EU	Academica Clinceni	Transfer	Summer	Undisclosed	Free	
3	DF	(Romania)	Ionuț Panțîru	23	EU	Politehnica Iași	Transfer	Summer	2024	€200,000	fcsb.ro
22	DF	(Romania)	Sorin Șerban	19	EU	Minaur Baia Mare	Transfer	Summer	2024	€100,000	fcsb.ro
27	FW	(Poland)	Łukasz Gikiewicz	31	EU	Hajer (Saudi Arabia)	Transfer	Summer	2020	Free	fcsb.ro
18	DF	(Greece)	Aristidis Soiledis	28	EU	Botoșani	Transfer	Summer	2020	€75,000	fcsb.ro
2	DF	(Romania)	Valentin Crețu	30	EU	Gaz Metan Mediaș	Transfer	Summer	2021	€125,000	fcsb.ro
73	DF	(Romania)	Andrei Marc	26	EU	Concordia Chiajna	Loan	Summer	2020	Free	fcsb.ro
88	FW	(Romania)	Adrian Popa	31	EU	Reading (England)	Loan	Summer	2020	Free	fcsb.ro
48	DF	(Bulgaria)	Bozhidar Chorbadzhiyski	24	EU	CSKA Sofia (Bulgaria)	Loan	Summer	2019	€50,000	fcsb.ro
4	DF	(Romania)	Cristian Manea	22	EU	Apollon Limassol (Cyprus)	Loan	Summer	2020	Free	fcsb.ro
49	FW	(Republic of the Congo)	Juvhel Tsoumou	28	EU	Hermannstadt	Transfer	Summer	2020	Free	fcsb.ro
—	DF	(Romania)	Mario Mihai	20	EU	Daco-Getica București	Loan return	Summer	2023	—	
—	GK	(Romania)	Ștefan Târnovanu	19	EU	Politehnica Iași	Transfer	Winter	2024	€200,000	
22	FW	(Romania)	Cristian Dumitru	18	EU	Academica Clinceni	Loan return	Winter	2022	—	
27	MF	(Romania)	Darius Olaru	21	EU	Gaz Metan Mediaș	Transfer	Winter	2024	€600,000	[https://www.fcsb.ro/ro/stiri/stire-bine-ai-venit-darius-olaru/ fcsb.ro]
—	FW	(Romania)	Ianis Stoica	17	EU	Petrolul Ploiești	Loan return	Winter	2023	—	
19	FW	(Romania)	Adrian Petre	22	EU	Esbjerg (Denmark)	Transfer	Winter	2024	€800,000	[https://www.fcsb.ro/ro/stiri/stire-bine-ai-venit-adrian-petre/ fcsb.ro]
4	DF	(Romania)	George Miron	25	EU	Botoșani	Transfer	Winter	2024	Free	fcsb.ro

==== Out ====
No.	Pos.	Nat.	Name	Age	EU	Moving to	Type	Transfer window	Transfer fee	Source
24	FW	(Romania)	Raul Rusescu	30	EU	Giresunspor (Turkey)	Mutual termination	Summer	—	fcsb.ro
—	MF	(Romania)	Ovidiu Horșia	18	EU	Politehnica Iași	Loan	Summer	—	
70	MF	(Romania)	Florentin Matei	26	EU	Astra Giurgiu	Mutual termination	Summer	—	fcsb.ro
80	MF	(Portugal)	Filipe Teixeira	38	EU		End of contract	Summer	—	fcsb.ro
18	MF	(Romania)	Vlad Mihalcea	20	EU	Voluntari	Transfer	Summer	Free	
—	DF	(Romania)	Gabriel Simion	21	EU	Astra Giurgiu	Loan	Summer	—	
—	MF	(Romania)	Ianis Stoica	16	EU	Petrolul Ploiești	Loan	Summer	—	
20	DF	(Romania)	Romario Benzar	27	EU	Lecce (Italy)	Transfer	Summer	€2,000,000	fcsb.ro
27	MF	(Romania)	Adrian Stoian	28	EU	Livorno (Italy)	Mutual termination	Summer	—	fcsb.ro
—	MF	(Romania)	Adrian Șut	20	EU	Academica Clinceni	Loan	Summer	—	
13	DF	(Romania) (Brazil)	Júnior Morais	32	EU	Gazişehir Gaziantep (Turkey)	Transfer	Summer	€600,000	fcsb.ro
—	FW	(Romania)	Daniel Benzar	21	EU	Voluntari	Transfer	Summer	Free	
29	MF	(Romania)	Robert Ion	18	EU	Academica Clinceni	Loan	Summer	—	
22	FW	(Romania)	Cristian Dumitru	17	EU	Academica Clinceni	Loan	Summer	—	
—	GK	(Romania)	Răzvan Ducan	18	EU	Argeș Pitești	Loan	Summer	—	
4	DF	(Romania)	Mihai Bălașa	24	EU	Universitatea Craiova	Transfer	Summer	—	fcsb.ro
22	DF	(Romania)	Sorin Șerban	19	EU	Politehnica Iași	Loan	Summer	—	
28	MF	(Romania)	Mihai Roman	34	EU	Botoșani	Transfer	Summer	—	fcsb.ro
73	DF	(Romania)	Andrei Marc	26	EU	Concordia Chiajna	End of loan	Summer	—	fcsb.ro
48	DF	(Bulgaria)	Bozhidar Chorbadzhiyski	24	EU	CSKA Sofia (Bulgaria)	End of loan	Winter	—	fcsb.ro
27	FW	(Poland)	Łukasz Gikiewicz	32	EU	Al-Faisaly (Jordan)	Mutual termination	Winter	—	
49	FW	(Republic of the Congo)	Juvhel Tsoumou	29	EU	Shenyang Urban (China)	Mutual termination	Winter	—	fcsb.ro
—	DF	(Romania)	Mario Mihai	20	EU	Tunari	Loan	Winter	—	
—	GK	(Romania)	Ștefan Târnovanu	19	EU	Politehnica Iași	Loan	Winter	—	
21	FW	(Romania)	Ioan Hora	31	EU	Gaz Metan Mediaș	Mutual termination	Winter	—	fcsb.ro
14	MF	(Switzerland) (Portugal)	Thierry Moutinho	28	EU	Córdoba (Spain)	Mutual termination	Winter	—	fcsb.ro
70	DF	(Romania)	Claudiu Belu	26	EU	Voluntari	Loan	Winter	—	
—	DF	(Romania)	Ianis Stoica	17	EU	Metaloglobus București	Loan	Winter	—	
4	DF	(Romania)	Cristian Manea	22	EU	CFR Cluj	End of loan	Winter	—	
24	MF	(Portugal)	Diogo Salomão	31	EU	Santa Clara (Portugal)	Mutual termination	Winter	—	
5	MF	(Romania)	Mihai Pintilii	35	EU		Retired	Winter	—	

EU = if holds or not a European Union passport; Country: when 2 flags, 1st flag = country that plays for internationally, 2nd flag = country of birth; N = number on jersey; P = Position (for position name, pause mouse pointer on abbreviation); Name = Name on jersey (for more extensive name, pause mouse pointer on name); Age = age on the day of the signing; Moving from = only indicate the club the player was playing before start playing for this club in this season, for the type of the moving see Status column; Moving to = only indicates the club the player is going to play next, for the type of the moving see Status column; Ends = when the player's current contract ends; n/a = Not applicable.

==== Overall transfer activity ====
===== Expenditure =====
Summer: ▼€2,000,000

Winter: ▼€1,600,000

Total: ▼€3,600,000

===== Income =====
Summer: ▲€2,600,000

Winter: ▲€0

Total: ▲€2,600,000

===== Net Totals =====
Summer: ▲€600,000

Winter: ▼€1,600,000

Total: ▼€1,000,000

== Friendly matches ==
Win Draw Loss

22 June 2019 Friendly	FCSB (Romania)	7–0	(Romania) Colțea Brașov	Tărlungeni, Romania
17:30 EEST (UTC+3)	Stoica 1'; Oaidă 45+1'; Tănase 49' (pen.); Hora 56'; Ion 63'; Niță 75' (pen.), 85'			Stadium: Unirea; Attendance: 1,000

25 June 2019 Friendly	Brașov (Romania)	0–4	(Romania) FCSB	Brașov, Romania
20:30 EEST (UTC+3)			Planić 4'; Tănase 6', 57'; Dumitru 90+2'	Stadium: Silviu Ploeșteanu; Attendance: 4,000

28 June 2019 Friendly	FCSB (Romania)	3–3	(Romania) Viitorul Constanța	Brașov, Romania
11:00 EEST (UTC+3)	Hora 21'; Oaidă 48', 53'		Iancu 28', 76' (pen.); Munteanu 85'	Stadium: Silviu Ploeșteanu; Attendance: 500

4 July 2019 Friendly	Mioveni (Romania)	0–1	(Romania) FCSB	Mioveni, Romania
20:30 EEST (UTC+3)			Tănase 57' (pen.)	Stadium: Orășenesc; Attendance: 5,000

12 October 2019 Friendly	FCSB (Romania)	1–2	(Romania) Voluntari	Bucharest, Romania
EEST (UTC+3)	Hora 60'		Julio Rodríguez 85', 90+2'	Stadium: Baza Sportivă FCSB

16 November 2019 Friendly	FCSB (Romania)	3–6	(Romania) Chindia Târgoviște	Bucharest, Romania
EEST (UTC+2)	Hora; Gnohéré; Momčilović		Burlacu; Dumiter; Șerban; Yaméogo	Stadium: Baza Sportivă FCSB

16 January 2020 Friendly	FCSB (Romania)	0–1	(Switzerland) Basel	Marbella, Spain
11:30 EEST (UTC+1)		Report	Zhegrova 84'	Stadium: Marbella Football Center

18 January 2020 Friendly	FCSB (Romania)	1–0	(Germany) Karlsruher SC	Estepona, Spain
15:00 EEST (UTC+1)	Coman 55'	Report		Stadium: Centro Deportivo Arroyo Enmedio

20 January 2020 Friendly	FCSB (Romania)	3–3	(Russia) Lokomotiv Moscow	Puerto Banús, Spain
16:30 EEST (UTC+1)	Manea 15', 43' (pen.); Momčilović 28'	Report	Miranchuk 26'; Barinov 32'; Zhemaletdinov 63'	Stadium: Centro Deportivo Dama de Noche

22 January 2020 Friendly	FCSB (Romania)	3–1	(South Korea) Jeonbuk Hyundai Motors	Puerto Banús, Spain
16:00 EEST (UTC+1)	Coman 17', 24'; Moruțan 34'		Veldwijk 64'	Stadium: Centro Deportivo Dama de Noche

== Competitions ==
Win Draw Loss

=== Overview ===
Competition	First match	Last match	Starting round	Record							
Competition	First match	Last match	Starting round	Pld	W	D	L	GF	GA	GD	Win %
Liga I	14 July 2019	July 2020	Matchday 1	28	14	6	8	43	32	+11	50.00
Cupa României	26 September 2019	2020	Round of 32	3	3	0	0	5	1	+4	100.00
Europa League	11 July 2019	29 August 2019	First qualifying round	8	4	2	2	10	5	+5	50.00
Total				39	21	8	10	58	38	+20	53.85

Last updated: 8 March 2020.
Source: Competitions

=== Liga I ===
==== Regular season ====
===== Table =====
Pos	Team	Pld	W	D	L	GF	GA	GD	Pts	Qualification
2	Universitatea Craiova	26	14	4	8	41	28	+13	46	Qualification for the Championship round
3	Botoșani	26	12	9	5	36	30	+6	45	Qualification for the Championship round
4	FCSB	26	13	5	8	37	29	+8	44	Qualification for the Championship round
5	Gaz Metan Mediaș	26	12	7	7	34	30	+4	43	Qualification for the Championship round
6	Astra Giurgiu (Note: Astra Giurgiu were deducted 3 points due to financial reasons.)	26	13	6	7	38	29	+9	42	Qualification for the Championship round

Source: LPF (in Romanian), Soccerway
Rules for classification: 1) Points; 2) Head-to-head points; 3) Head-to-head goal difference; 4) Head-to-head goals scored; 5) Goal difference; 6) Goals scored; 7) Play-off.

===== Results summary =====
Overall								Home						Away					
Pld	W	D	L	GF	GA	GD	Pts	W	D	L	GF	GA	GD	W	D	L	GF	GA	GD
28	14	6	8	43	32	+11	48	6	4	4	21	18	+3	8	2	4	22	14	+8

Last updated: 8 March 2020 (UTC).
Source: FCSB

===== Position by round =====
Round	1	2	3	4	5	6	7	8	9	10	11	12	13	14	15	16	17	18	19	20	21	22	23	24	25	26
Ground	H	A	H	A	H	H	A	H	A	H	A	H	A	A	H	A	H	A	A	H	A	H	A	H	A	H
Result	W	D	L	L	L	L	L	W	W	D	W	D	W	W	W	W	L	W	W	W	W	W	L	D	L	D
Position	2	6	8	9	10	11	14	11	11	9	9	10	8	7	6	5	5	5	4	3	2	2	2	3	3	4

Updated to match(es) played on 8 March 2020 (UTC). Source: Matches
A = Away; H = Home; W = Win; D = Draw; L = Loss

===== Results =====
14 July 2019 1	FCSB	4–3	Hermannstadt	Pitești
21:00 EEST (UTC+03)	Coman 23', (yellow card) 71'; Hora 30'; Man 53'; Belu (yellow card) 73'; Nedelcu 80', (yellow card) 81'; Planić (yellow card) 90+4'		Dumitriu (yellow card) 16'; Mățel (yellow card) 36'; Tsoumou 45+1'; Dandea 57', (yellow card) 68'; Dâlbea (penalty missed) 90+3'; Debeljuh 90+3'	Stadium: Nicolae Dobrin; Attendance: 4,500; Referee: Horațiu Feșnic; Assistant referees: Alexandru Cerei, Mihai Marica; Fourth official: Florin Andrei

22 July 2019 2	Sepsi Sfântu Gheorghe	0–0	FCSB	Sfântu Gheorghe
21:00 EEST (UTC+03)	Velev (yellow card) 86'; Niczuly (yellow card) 90+4'			Stadium: Municipal; Attendance: 4,000; Referee: Iulian Călin; Assistant referees: Vladimir Urzică, Florin Păunescu; Fourth official: Cătălin Buşi

29 July 2019 3	FCSB	0–2	Botoșani	Pitești
20:00 EEST (UTC+03)	Moutinho (yellow card) 71'; Oaidă (yellow card) 90'		Andronic 18'; Ongenda 40'; Papa (yellow card) 42'	Stadium: Nicolae Dobrin; Attendance: 3,174; Referee: Lucian Ruşandu; Assistant referees: Radu Ghinguleac, Imre-Laszlo Bucsi; Fourth official: Bogdan Dumitrache

5 August 2019 4	Astra Giurgiu	2–1	FCSB	Giurgiu
21:00 EEST (UTC+03)	Gheorghe 20', (yellow card) 68'; Graovac (yellow card) 57'; Alibec 75'; Bruno (yellow card) 81'		Oaidă 28'; Popescu (yellow card) 50'; Moutinho (yellow card) 87'; Coman (yellow card) 90'	Stadium: Marin Anastasovici; Attendance: 2,500; Referee: István Kovács; Assistant referees: Vasile Marinescu, Ovidiu Artene; Fourth official: Cătălin Popa

11 August 2019 5	FCSB	1–3	Voluntari	Pitești
21:00 EEST (UTC+03)	Marc (yellow card) 11'; Vînă (yellow card) 45+2'; Botezatu (yellow card) 48'; Coman 49'; Gikiewicz (yellow card) 86'; Șerban (yellow card) 87'		Țîră 1'; Ricardinho (yellow card) 20', (goal) 51'; Botezatu 68' (o.g.); Gorobsov (yellow card) 87'	Stadium: Nicolae Dobrin; Attendance: 2,000; Referee: Adrian Comănescu; Assistant referees: Stelian Slabu, Ferencz Tunyogi; Fourth official: Cătălin Busi

18 August 2019 6	FCSB	1–2	Politehnica Iași	Pitești
21:00 EEST (UTC+03)	Cristea (yellow card) 50'; Tănase 52' (pen.), (yellow card) 70'; Marc (yellow card) 68'		Diallo (yellow card) 36'; Frăsinescu 41'; F. Cristea (yellow card) 47'; Loshaj 73'; Platini (yellow card) 90+4'	Stadium: Nicolae Dobrin; Attendance: 3,500; Referee: Bîrsan Marcel; Assistant referees: Mihai Marius Marica, Marius Nicoară; Fourth official: Andrei Antonie

25 August 2019 7	Gaz Metan Mediaș	4–0	FCSB	Mediaș
21:00 EEST (UTC+03)	Olaru 17', (yellow card) 45'; Constantin 57'; Dumitru (yellow card) 23', (goal) 65'; Velisar 86'		Cristea (yellow card) 30' (yellow-red card) 64'; Chorbadzhiyski (yellow card) 31' (yellow-red card) 75'; Bălgrădean (yellow card) 65'; Roman (yellow card) 87'	Stadium: Gaz Metan; Attendance: 6,000; Referee: Marius Avram; Assistant referees: Vladimir Urzică, Ciprian Florin Danşa; Fourth official: Robert George Dumitru

1 September 2019 8	FCSB	2–1	Viitorul Constanța	Pitești
21:00 EEST (UTC+03)	Vînă (penalty missed) 18'; Popescu (yellow card) 33'; Oaidă (yellow card) 35'; Popa 38'; Gnohéré 65'		Iacob (yellow card) 42'; Iancu 45+1'; Filip (yellow card) 57'; Houri (yellow card) 62'	Stadium: Nicolae Dobrin; Attendance: 4,755; Referee: Radu Petrescu; Assistant referees: Radu Ghinguleac, Valentin Avram; Fourth official: Lucian Rusandu

15 September 2019 9	Universitatea Craiova	0–1	FCSB	Craiova
21:00 EEST (UTC+03)	Bărbuț (yellow card) 21'; Mihăilă (yellow card) 23'; Ivan (yellow card) 71'; Martić (yellow card) 87'; Kelić (yellow card) 90+1'		Coman (yellow card) 9'; Panțîru (yellow card) 59'; Popescu (yellow card) 78'; Tănase (yellow card) 82'; Tsoumou 88'	Stadium: Ion Oblemenco; Attendance: 30,000; Referee: István Kovács; Assistant referees: Vasile Marinescu, Ovidiu Artene; Fourth official: Mazilu Florin Ovidiu

22 September 2019 10	FCSB	0–0	CFR Cluj	Bucharest
20:30 EEST (UTC+03)	Cristea (yellow card) 45'; Tsoumou (yellow card) 61'; Panțîru (yellow card) 90+1'		Bordeianu (yellow card) 90+5'	Stadium: Arena Națională; Attendance: 15,877; Referee: Ovidiu Hațegan; Assistant referees: Octavian Șovre, Sebastian Gheorghe; Fourth official: Iulian Dima

29 September 2019 11	Academica Clinceni	0–3	FCSB	Călărași
17:00 EEST (UTC+03)	Patriche (yellow card) 25'; Achim (yellow card) 39'; Popescu (yellow card) 46'; Chatziterzoglou (yellow card) 58'; Buziuc (yellow card) 83'		Tănase 12'; Coman 65'; Oaidă (yellow card) 70'; Moruțan 80'; Planić (yellow card) 90+3'	Stadium: Ion Comșa; Attendance: 3,500; Referee: Horațiu Feșnic; Assistant referees: Alexandru Cerei, Bogdan Gheorghe; Fourth official: Cătălin Busi

5 October 2019 12	FCSB	1–1	Dinamo București	Bucharest
20:30 EEST (UTC+03)	Coman 28', (yellow card) 30'; Tănase (yellow card) 32'; Vînă (yellow card) 45+8'; Oaidă (yellow card) 59'; Planić (yellow card) 71'; Popescu (yellow card) 74'		Filip (yellow card) 2'; Ciobotariu 9', (yellow card) 88'; Puljić (yellow card) 18'; Neicuțescu (yellow card) 27'; Corbu (yellow card) 32'; Nistor (yellow card) 77'	Stadium: Arena Națională; Attendance: 30,235; Referee: István Kovács; Assistant referees: Vasile Marinescu, Ovidiu Artene; Fourth official: Iulian Călin

20 October 2019 13	Chindia Târgoviște	1–2	FCSB	Ploiești
20:30 EEST (UTC+03)	Florea 14', (yellow card) 53'; Dumitrașcu (yellow card) 27'; Leca (yellow card) 69'; Pițian (yellow card) 86'		Panțîru (yellow card) 25'; Crețu (yellow card) 26'; Leca 31' (o.g.); Planić (yellow card) 53'; Gnohéré 57'; Tănase (yellow card) 62'; Popa (yellow card) 84'	Stadium: Ilie Oană; Attendance: 10,000; Referee: Ionuț Coza; Assistant referees: Ciprian Florin Danșa, Ionel Valentin Dumitru; Fourth official: Gabriel Horia Mladinovici

26 October 2019 14	Hermannstadt	0–4	FCSB	Târgu Mureș
20:30 EEST (UTC+03)	Romário (yellow card) 49'; Dumitriu (yellow card) 82'		Coman 39', 51'; Popa 44', (yellow card) 67'; Gnohéré 72'; Chorbadzhiyski (yellow card) 74' (yellow-red card) 90+3'	Stadium: Trans-Sil; Attendance: 3,700; Referee: Cătălin Popa; Assistant referees: Radu Ghinguleac, Ferencz Tunyogi; Fourth official: Iulian Călin

3 November 2019 15	FCSB	2–1	Sepsi Sfântu Gheorghe	Bucharest
21:00 EEST (UTC+02)	Gnohéré 56' (pen.); Tănase 60'; Popescu (yellow card) 73'; Coman (yellow card) 90+3'		Karanović 27'; Vașvari (yellow card) 43'; Fülöp (yellow card) 56'; Konongo (yellow card) 83'	Stadium: Arena Națională; Attendance: 3,273; Referee: Horațiu Feșnic; Assistant referees: Alexandru Cerei, Valentin Avram; Fourth official: Cătălin Popa

9 November 2019 16	Botoșani	0–2	FCSB	Botoșani
20:30 EEST (UTC+02)	Keyta (yellow card) 53'; Moussa (yellow card) 90'		Planić (yellow card) 26' (yellow-red card) 63'; Coman 31'; Man (yellow card) 46'; Cristea (yellow card) 52'; Gnohéré 74', (yellow card) 81'	Stadium: Municipal; Attendance: 5,000; Referee: Iulian Călin; Assistant referees: Octavian Şovre, George Florin Neacşu; Fourth official: Cătălin Buşi

23 November 2019 17	FCSB	1–3	Astra Giurgiu	Bucharest
20:30 EEST (UTC+02)	Gnohéré 18'; Crețu (yellow card) 51'		Răduț (yellow card) 11'; Alibec 30', (yellow card) 49', (goal) 60'; Gheorghe (yellow card) 39'; Enache 90+6'	Stadium: Arena Națională; Attendance: 3,438; Referee: Marius Avram; Assistant referees: Mircea Orbuleţ, Mihai Marius Marica; Fourth official: Horia Gabriel Mladinovici

3 December 2019 19	Politehnica Iași	1–2	FCSB	Iași
20:30 EEST (UTC+02)	A. Cristea 15'; Onea (yellow card) 37'; F. Cristea (yellow card) 88'		Tănase 31' (pen.); Cristea (yellow card) 36'; Planić (yellow card) 58'; Vînă (yellow card) 73'; Man 90+2'	Stadium: Emil Alexandrescu; Attendance: 4,000; Referee: István Kovács; Assistant referees: Vasile Marinescu, Ovidiu Artene; Fourth official: Florin Mazilu

6 December 2019 20	FCSB	2–0	Gaz Metan Mediaș	Bucharest
20:30 EEST (UTC+02)	Popescu (yellow card) 27'; Coman 66'; Man 79'; Moruțan (yellow card) 83'		Droppa (yellow card) 27'; Velisar (yellow card) 29'; Romeo (yellow card) 57'; Constantin (yellow card) 74'; Fofana (yellow card) 78'	Stadium: Arena Națională; Attendance: 1,370; Referee: Iulian Călin; Assistant referees: Gabriel Stroe, Marius Marica; Fourth official: Iulian Dima

15 December 2019 21	Viitorul Constanța	0–2	FCSB	Ovidiu
20:30 EEST (UTC+02)	Artean (yellow card) 16'; Mladen (yellow card) 40'; Ghiță (yellow card) 50'		Soiledis 22'; Crețu (yellow card) 38'; Coman 45'; Moruțan (yellow card) 52'	Stadium: Viitorul; Attendance: 4,500; Referee: Radu Petrescu; Assistant referees: Mircea Mihail Grigoriu, Marius Nicoară; Fourth official: Andrei Antonie

22 December 2019 22	FCSB	2–0	Universitatea Craiova	Bucharest
20:00 EEST (UTC+02)	Man 41', (yellow card) 81'; Coman 45'; Tănase (penalty missed) 45+3', (yellow card) 70'; Moruțan (yellow card) 80'; Hora (yellow card) 90+1'		Cicâldău (yellow card) 20'; Popescu (yellow card) 45+2'; Bălașa (yellow card) 90'	Stadium: Arena Națională; Attendance: 13,210; Referee: Marcel Bîrsan; Assistant referees: Mircea Orbuleț, Valentin Avram; Fourth official: Ionuţ Coza

2 February 2020 23	CFR Cluj	1–0	FCSB	Cluj-Napoca
20:00 EEST (UTC+02)	Omrani (yellow card) 30'; Đoković (yellow card) 64'; Vinícius 79'; Deac (yellow card) 82'		Man (yellow card) 64'; Olaru (yellow card) 73'; Planić (red card) 77'; Crețu (yellow card) 77'; Coman (yellow card) 79'	Stadium: Dr. Constantin Rădulescu; Attendance: 10,000; Referee: István Kovács; Assistant referees: Vasile Marinescu, Ovidiu Artene; Fourth official: Florin Mihai Marcu

6 February 2020 18	Voluntari	1–2	FCSB	Voluntari
20:00 EEST (UTC+02)	Simonovski 32'; Armaș (red card) 44'		Olaru 8'; Coman 42'; Cristea (yellow card) 79'; Oaidă (yellow card) 90+1'	Stadium: Anghel Iordănescu; Attendance: 1,874; Referee: Horia Gabriel Mladinovic; Assistant referees: Marius Badea, George Florin Neacşu; Fourth official: Cătălin Sorin Popa

10 February 2020 24	FCSB	0–0	Academica Clinceni	Bucharest
20:00 EEST (UTC+02)	Lucian Filip (yellow card) 80'		Buziuc (yellow card) 25'; Bejan (yellow card) 28'; Popescu (yellow card) 89'	Stadium: Arena Națională; Attendance: 2,200; Referee: Iulian Dima; Assistant referees: Ionel Valentin Dumitru, Ferencz Tunyogi; Fourth official: Marcel Bîrsan

16 February 2020 25	Dinamo București	2–1	FCSB	Bucharest
20:00 EEST (UTC+02)	Mrzljak (yellow card) 21'; Fabbrini (yellow card) 31'; Sin 37'; Filip (yellow card) 45+8'; Lazăr (yellow card) 59', (goal) 62'; Koštrna (yellow card) 89'		Planić (yellow card) 33'; Cristea (red card) 45+5'; Tănase 45+9' (pen.); Man (yellow card) 76'; Oaidă (yellow card) 87'	Stadium: Arena Națională; Attendance: 27,500; Referee: Horaţiu Feşnic; Assistant referees: Mihai Marius Marica, Marius Badea; Fourth official: Ionuţ Coza

23 February 2020 26	FCSB	1–1	Chindia Târgoviște	Bucharest
EEST (UTC+02)	Miron 14'; Nedelcu (yellow card) 40'; Planić (yellow card) 90+3'		Corbu (yellow card) 62'; Rață (yellow card) 77'; Dangubić 90+1'; Moldovan (yellow card) 90+3'	Stadium: Arena Națională; Attendance: 3,500; Referee: Sebastian Colțescu; Assistant referees: Vasile Marinescu, Bogdan Gheorghe; Fourth official: Cătălin Popa

==== Championship round ====
===== Table =====
Pos	Team	Pld	W	D	L	GF	GA	GD	Pts	Qualification
1	CFR Cluj (C)	10	7	2	1	17	7	+10	49	Qualification to Champions League first qualifying round
2	Universitatea Craiova	9	7	0	2	17	14	+3	44	Qualification to Europa League first qualifying round
3	Astra Giurgiu (Note: Astra Giurgiu failed to obtain a UEFA licence.)	8	3	3	2	12	8	+4	33	
4	Botoșani	10	2	3	5	10	12	−2	32	Qualification to Europa League first qualifying round
5	FCSB (Note: FCSB qualified for the Europa League first qualifying round by winning the 2019–20 Cupa României.)	9	2	3	4	13	14	−1	31	Qualification to Europa League first qualifying round
6	Gaz Metan Mediaș	10	0	3	7	5	19	−14	25	

Source: Soccerway, FRF (in Romanian), LPF (in Romanian)
Rules for classification: 1) Points; 2) Points without rounding; 3) Head-to-head points; 4) Head-to-head goal difference; 5) Head-to-head goals scored; 6) Goal difference; 7) Goals scored; 8) Play-off (only if needed to decide champion or teams for UEFA competitions). (Note: only criteria 6 and 7 are applied to establish the classification during the competition.)
(C) Champions

==== Championship round results summary ====
Overall								Home						Away					
Pld	W	D	L	GF	GA	GD	Pts	W	D	L	GF	GA	GD	W	D	L	GF	GA	GD
2	1	1	0	6	3	+3	4	1	0	0	4	1	+3	0	1	0	2	2	0

Last updated: 8 March 2020.
Source: Liga I

==== Championship round position by round ====
Round	1	2	3	4	5	6	7	8	9	10
Ground	A	H	A	H	A	H	A	H	A	H
Result	D	W	L	D	L	D	L	L	W	P
Position	4	2	3	3	4	4	5	5	4	5

Updated to match(es) played on 8 March 2020. Source: Liga I
A = Away; H = Home; W = Win; D = Draw; L = Loss

==== Championship Matches ====
Win Draw Loss

29 February 2020 1	Botoșani	2–2	FCSB	Botoșani
20:30 EEST (UTC+02)	Dugandžić 5', 52'; Papa (yellow card) 25'; Șeroni (yellow card) 29'; Chindriș (yellow card) 38'; Hamidou Keyta (yellow card) 90'		Panțîru (yellow card) 5'; Man 12'; Tănase (yellow card) 25'; Olaru 45+1', (yellow card) 59'; Crețu (yellow card) 89'; Popescu (yellow card) 90+4'	Stadium: Municipal; Attendance: 5,000; Referee: Ovidiu Hațegan; Assistant referees: Octavian Şovre, Sebastian Gheorghe; Fourth official: Iulian Dima

8 March 2020 2	FCSB	4–1	Universitatea Craiova	Bucharest
20:30 EEST (UTC+02)	Popescu (yellow card) 10'; Panțîru (yellow card) 18'; Oaidă 23', 57'; Tănase 79'; Man 84', (yellow card) 90+2'		Bancu (yellow card) 35'; Bărbuț 45'; Bălașa (yellow card) 60'; Cicâldău (yellow card) 87'; Nistor (yellow card) 90+1'; Ćosić (yellow card) 90+1'	Stadium: Arena Națională; Attendance: 0^{1}^{1}Impact of the COVID-19 pandemic on association football Referee: István Kovács; Assistant referees: Vasile Marinescu, Valentin Avram; Fourth official: Andrei Antonie

14 June 2020 3	CFR Cluj	1–0	FCSB	Cluj-Napoca
20:00 EEST (UTC+03)				Stadium: Dr. Constantin Rădulescu

20 June 2020 4	FCSB	2–2	Gaz Metan Mediaș	Bucharest
21:00 EEST (UTC+02)				Stadium: Arena Națională

27 June 2020 5	Astra Giurgiu	3–2	FCSB	Giurgiu
20:00 EEST (UTC+02)				Stadium: Stadionul Marin Anastasovici

4 July 2020 6	FCSB	1–1	Botoșani	Bucharest
EEST (UTC+02)				Stadium: Arena Națională

11 July 2020 7	Universitatea Craiova	2–1	FCSB	Craiova
EEST (UTC+02)				Stadium: Stadionul Ion Oblemenco

18 July 2020 8	FCSB	0–2	CFR Cluj	Bucharest
EEST (UTC+02)				Stadium: Arena Națională

25 July 2020 9	Gaz Metan Mediaș	0–1	FCSB	Mediaș
EEST (UTC+02)				Stadium: Gaz Metan

Cancelled 10	FCSB	v	Astra Giurgiu	Bucharest
EEST (UTC+02)				Stadium: Arena Națională

=== Cupa României ===
==== Results ====
26 September 2019 Round of 32	Metaloglobus București	0–2	FCSB	Voluntari
21:30 EEST (UTC+03)	Coman (yellow card) 80'		Moruțan (yellow card) 10', (goal) 14'; Man 40'	Stadium: Stadionul Anghel Iordănescu; Attendance: 1,500; Referee: Adrian Viorel Cojocaru; Assistant referees: Marius Nicoară, Marius Cristian Marchidanu; Fourth official: George Cătălin Găman

29 October 2019 Round of 16	Universitatea Cluj	0–1	FCSB	Cluj-Napoca
21:00 EEST (UTC+02)	Crăciun (yellow card) 79'		Hora 12'; Tănase (penalty missed) 87'; Vlad (yellow card) 90+3'	Stadium: Cluj Arena; Attendance: 13,243; Referee: Andrei Florin Chivulete; Assistant referees: Ciprian Florin Danşa, Andrei Constantinescu; Fourth official: Szabolcs Kovacs

5 March 2020 Quarter-finals	Hermannstadt	1–2	FCSB	Sibiu
20:00 EEST (UTC+02)	Dobrosavlevici (yellow card) 61'; Romário (yellow card) 72'; Debeljuh 75'		Crețu (yellow card) 16'; Popescu (yellow card) 23'; Coman (yellow card) 53', (goal) 90'; Miron (yellow card) 76'; Luchin 84' (o.g.); Vlad (yellow card) 90+4'	Stadium: Municipal; Attendance: 4,000; Referee: George Găman; Assistant referees: Mircea Orbuleţ, Alexandru Cerei; Fourth official: Florin Marcu

24 June 2020 Semi-finals	Dinamo București	0–3	FCSB	Bucharest
EEST (UTC+02)				Stadium: Stadionul Dinamo

8 July 2020 Semi-finals	FCSB	1–0 (4–0 agg.)	Dinamo	Bucharest
EEST (UTC+02)				Stadium: Arena Națională

22 July 2020 Final	Sepsi	0–1	FCSB	Ploiești
EEST (UTC+02)				Stadium: Ilie Oană Stadium

=== UEFA Europa League ===
==== Qualifying rounds ====
===== First qualifying round =====
11 July 2019 First leg	FCSB (Romania)	2–0	(Moldova) Milsami Orhei	Giurgiu, Romania
21:30 EEST (UTC+03)	Tănase 12', 56'; L. Filip (yellow card) 64' (yellow-red card) 72'	Report	S. Plătică (yellow card) 33'; Crăciun (yellow card) 58'; Jardan (yellow card) 69'	Stadium: Marin Anastasovici; Attendance: 4,850; Referee: Kristoffer Hagenes (Norway); Assistant referees: Magnus Lundberg, Anders Olav Dale; Fourth official: Trygve Kjensli

18 July 2019 Second leg	Milsami Orhei (Moldova)	1–2 (1–4 agg.)	(Romania) FCSB	Orhei, Moldova
20:00 EEST (UTC+03)	Stînă (yellow card) 15'; Bolohan 47'; Crăciun (yellow card) 56'; Andronic (yellow card) 62'; Onica (yellow card) 75'	Report	Dumitru 4'; Oaidă 42'; Nedelcu (yellow card) 50'; Ion (yellow card) 85'	Stadium: CSR Orhei; Attendance: 3,000; Referee: Timotheos Christofi (Cyprus); Assistant referees: Pavlos Georgiou, Marios Kalogirou; Fourth official: Kyriakos Christodoulou

===== Second qualifying round =====
25 July 2019 First leg	Alashkert (Armenia)	0–3	(Romania) FCSB	Yerevan, Armenia
20:00 EEST (UTC+03)	Grigoryan (yellow card) 76'; Voskanyan (yellow card) 88'	Report	Cristea (yellow card) 16', (goal) 68'; Tănase 60'; Coman 82'	Stadium: Yerevan Football Academy Stadium; Attendance: 1,420; Referee: Robert Harvey (Ireland); Assistant referees: Wayne McDonnell, Mark Gavin; Fourth official: Bernard Connolly

1 August 2019 Second leg	FCSB (Romania)	2–3 (5–3 agg.)	(Armenia) Alashkert	Giurgiu, Romania
21:30 EEST (UTC+03)	Tănase 10' (pen.); Bălașa (red card) 27'; Oaidă (yellow card) 57'; Coman 59'; Cristea (yellow card) 68'	Report	Marmentini 23', 28' (pen.), (red card) 63'; Ishkhanyan (yellow card) 30'; Thiago Galvão 45'; Hayrapetyan (yellow card) 45+2'	Stadium: Marin Anastasovici; Attendance: 1,828; Referee: Peter Kralovič (Slovakia); Assistant referees: Jan Pozor, Erik Weiss; Fourth official: Pavel Ochotnicky

===== Third qualifying round =====
8 August 2019 First leg	FCSB (Romania)	0–0	(Czech Republic) Mladá Boleslav	Giurgiu, Romania
21:30 EEST (UTC+03)	Popescu (yellow card) 16'; Oaidă (yellow card) 54'; Coman (yellow card) 90+1'; Moutinho (yellow card) 90+4'	Report	Matějovský (yellow card) 28'; Komlichenko (yellow card) 47'; Mešanović (yellow card) 56'	Stadium: Marin Anastasovici; Attendance: 2,315; Referee: Adrien Jaccottet (Switzerland); Assistant referees: Vital Jobin, Jonas Erni; Fourth official: Fedayi San

15 August 2019 Second leg	Mladá Boleslav (Czech Republic)	0–1 (0–1 agg.)	(Romania) FCSB	Mladá Boleslav, Czech Republic
20:00 EEST (UTC+03)	Křapka (yellow card) 45+2' (yellow-red card) 75'; Fulnek (yellow card) 90+5'	Report	Cristea (yellow card) 28'; Tănase (yellow card) 48'; Soiledis (yellow card) 50'; Coman (yellow card) 61'; Planić (yellow card) 84'; Panțâru 90+1'	Stadium: Lokotrans Aréna; Attendance: 4,695; Referee: Jonathan Lardot (Belgium); Assistant referees: Florian Lemaire, Romain Devillers; Fourth official: Nathan Verboomen

===== Play-off round =====
22 August 2019 First leg	FCSB (Romania)	0–0	(Portugal) Vitória de Guimarães	Giurgiu, Romania
21:30 EEST (UTC+03)	Crețu (yellow card) 17'; Tănase (yellow card) 53'; Pintilii (yellow card) 57'; Popescu (yellow card) 88'	Report	Elmusrati (yellow card) 15'	Stadium: Marin Anastasovici; Attendance: 4,518; Referee: Matej Jug (Slovenia); Assistant referees: Matej Zunici, Grega Kordez; Fourth official: Nejc Kajtazovic

29 August 2019 Second leg	Vitória de Guimarães (Portugal)	1–0 (1–0 agg.)	(Romania) FCSB	Guimarães, Portugal
22:00 EEST (UTC+03)	Tapsoba 53' (pen.)	Report	Crețu (yellow card) 3'; Soiledis (yellow card) 34'; Panțîru (yellow card) 68'; Moutinho (yellow card) 74'; Planić (yellow card) 90+2'	Stadium: D. Afonso Henriques; Attendance: 18,352; Referee: Irfan Peljto (Bosnia and Herzegovina); Assistant referees: Senad Ibrišimbegović, Admir Šehović; Fourth official: Admir Šehović

== Statistics ==
=== Appearances and goals ===
As of 8 March 2020

S

No.	Pos	Player	Liga I		Cupa României		Europa League		Total	
No.	Pos	Player	Apps	Goals	Apps	Goals	Apps	Goals	Apps	Goals
2	DF	(Romania) Valentin Crețu	20	0	2	0	4	0	26	0
3	DF	(Romania) Ionuț Panțîru	19	0	1	0	4	1	24	1
4	DF	(Romania) George Miron	2	1	1	0	0	0	3	1
6	MF	(Romania) Dragoș Nedelcu	10	1	1	0	3	0	14	1
7	FW	(Romania) Florinel Coman	25	11	2	1	8	2	35	14
8	MF	(Romania) Lucian Filip	10	0	1	0	4	0	15	0
10	FW	(Romania) Florin Tănase	25	6	3	0	8	4	36	10
11	FW	(Romania) Olimpiu Moruțan	18	1	3	1	0	0	21	2
15	DF	(Serbia) Marko Momčilović	1	0	0	0	0	0	1	0
16	DF	(Serbia) Bogdan Planić	20	0	1	0	8	0	29	0
17	DF	(Romania) Iulian Cristea	23	0	1	0	7	1	31	1
18	DF	(Greece) Aristidis Soiledis	14	1	1	0	4	0	19	1
19	FW	(Romania) Adrian Petre	2	0	1	0	0	0	3	0
20	MF	(Romania) Ionuț Vînă	16	0	3	0	6	0	25	0
23	MF	(Romania) Ovidiu Popescu	22	0	1	0	8	0	31	0
25	DF	(Romania) Ovidiu Perianu	1	0	0	0	1	0	2	0
26	MF	(Romania) Răzvan Oaidă	21	3	2	0	7	1	30	4
27	MF	(Romania) Darius Olaru	7	2	1	0	0	0	8	2
31	DF	(Romania) Marian Botezatu	1	0	0	0	0	0	1	0
34	GK	(Romania) Cristian Bălgrădean	20	0	1	0	2	0	23	0
77	DF	(Romania) Alexandru Stan	0	0	0	0	1	0	1	0
88	MF	(Romania) Adrian Popa	15	2	1	0	1	0	17	2
92	MF	(Romania) Adrian Niță	0	0	1	0	0	0	1	0
98	FW	(Romania) Dennis Man	18	6	3	1	3	0	24	7
99	GK	(Romania) Andrei Vlad	9	0	2	0	6	0	17	0
—	FW	(Romania) Cristian Dumitru	0	0	0	0	2	1	2	1
Players sent out on loan this season
22	DF	(Romania) Sorin Șerban	1	0	0	0	0	0	1	0
28	MF	(Romania) Mihai Roman	4	0	0	0	4	0	8	0
29	MF	(Romania) Robert Ion	0	0	0	0	1	0	1	0
30	MF	(Romania) Laurențiu Ardelean	1	0	0	0	0	0	1	0
70	DF	(Romania) Claudiu Belu	5	0	1	0	3	0	9	0
Players transferred out during the season
5	MF	(Romania) Mihai Pintilii	5	0	0	0	2	0	7	0
9	FW	(France) Harlem Gnohéré	18	6	1	0	2	0	21	6
14	MF	(Portugal) Thierry Moutinho	7	0	2	0	4	0	13	0
21	FW	(Romania) Ioan Hora	11	1	2	1	3	0	16	2
24	FW	(Portugal) Diogo Salomão	3	0	0	0	3	0	6	0
48	DF	(Bulgaria) Bozhidar Chorbadzhiyski	3	0	1	0	0	0	4	0
49	DF	(Republic of the Congo) Juvhel Tsoumou	2	1	1	0	0	0	3	1
73	DF	(Romania) Andrei Marc	2	0	0	0	0	0	2	0
—	DF	(Romania) Mihai Bălașa	4	0	0	0	1	0	5	0
—	DF	(Romania) Cristian Manea	2	0	2	0	0	0	4	0
—	FW	(Poland) Łukasz Gikiewicz	3	0	0	0	1	0	4	0

=== Squad statistics ===
	Liga I	Cupa României	Europa League	Home	Away	Total Stats
Games played	28	3	8	18	21	39
Games won	14	3	4	7	14	21
Games drawn	6	0	2	4	4	8
Games lost	8	0	2	5	5	10
Goals scored	43	5	10	25	33	58
Goals conceded	32	1	5	21	17	38
Goal difference	+11	+4	+5	+4	+16	+20
Clean sheets	10	2	5	6	11	17
Goal by Substitute	7	1	2	5	5	10
Total shots	284	9	76	197	172	369
Shots on target	139	4	37	100	80	180
Corners	144	4	39	94	93	187
Players used	38	28	28	38	36	42
Offsides	40	1	19	31	29	60
Fouls suffered	413	25	119	255	302	557
Fouls committed	473	14	120	288	319	607
Yellow cards	79	7	23	50	59	109
Red cards	6	0	2	2	6	8
Winning rate	50%	100%	50%	38.89%	66.67%	53.85%

Last updated: 8 March 2020
Source: Competitive matches

=== Goalscorers ===
As of 8 March 2020

Rank	Position	Name	Liga I	Cupa României	Europa League	Total
1	FW	(Romania) Florinel Coman	12	1	2	15
2	FW	(Romania) Florin Tănase	7	0	4	11
3	FW	(Romania) Dennis Man	7	2	0	9
4	FW	(France) Harlem Gnohéré	6	0	0	6
5	MF	(Romania) Răzvan Oaidă	3	0	1	4
6	FW	(Romania) Adrian Popa	2	1	0	3
6	MF	(Romania) Darius Olaru	2	1	0	3
8	MF	(Romania) Olimpiu Moruțan	1	1	0	2
8	FW	(Romania) Ioan Hora	1	1	0	2
8	DF	(Romania) Iulian Cristea	1	0	1	2
8	FW	(Romania) Cristian Dumitru	0	1	1	2
8	FW	(Romania) Adrian Petre	1	1	0	2
15	MF	(Romania) Dragoș Nedelcu	1	0	0	1
15	FW	(Republic of the Congo) Juvhel Tsoumou	1	0	0	1
15	DF	(Greece) Aristidis Soiledis	1	0	0	1
15	DF	(Romania) George Miron	1	0	0	1
15	DF	(Romania) Ionuț Panțîru	0	0	1	1
15	MID	(Romania) Ovidiu Popescu	1	0	0	1
15	MID	(Romania) Ionuț Vînă	1	0	0	1
Own goal			1	1	0	2
Total			50	10	10	70

=== Goal minutes ===
	1'–15'	16'–30'	31'–HT	46'–60'	61'–75'	76'–FT	Extra time	Forfeit
Goals	9	7	14	11	6	11	0	0
Percentage	15.52%	12.07%	24.14%	18.97%	10.34%	18.97%	0%	0%

Last updated: 8 March 2020 (UTC)
Source: FCSB (in Romanian)

=== Hat-tricks ===
Player	Against	Result	Date	Competition

=== Clean sheets ===
As of 8 March 2020

Rank	Name	Liga I	Cupa României	Europa League	Total	Games played
1	(Romania) Cristian Bălgrădean	10	1	1	12	23
2	(Romania) Andrei Vlad	1	3	4	8	27
3	(Romania) Mihai Udrea	0	1	0	1	1
Total		11	5	16	21	51

=== Disciplinary record ===
As of 8 March 2020

Rank	Position	Name	Liga I			Cupa României			Europa League			Total		
Rank	Position	Name	Booked	(yellow card) (yellow-red card)	Sent off (straight red)	Booked	(yellow card) (yellow-red card)	Sent off (straight red)	Booked	(yellow card) (yellow-red card)	Sent off (straight red)	Booked	(yellow card) (yellow-red card)	Sent off (straight red)
1	DF	(Serbia) Bogdan Planić	7	1	1	0	0	0	2	0	0	9	1	1
1	MF	(Romania) Ovidiu Popescu	8	0	0	1	0	0	2	0	0	11	0	0
3	DF	(Romania) Iulian Cristea	5	1	1	0	0	0	3	0	0	8	1	1
4	FW	(Romania) Florinel Coman	6	0	0	1	0	0	2	0	0	9	0	0
5	FW	(Romania) Florin Tănase	6	0	0	0	0	0	2	0	0	8	0	0
5	MF	(Romania) Răzvan Oaidă	6	0	0	0	0	0	2	0	0	8	0	0
5	DF	(Romania) Valentin Crețu	5	0	0	1	0	0	2	0	0	8	0	0
8	DF	(Romania) Ionuț Panțîru	5	0	0	0	0	0	1	0	0	6	0	0
9	FW	(Romania) Dennis Man	5	0	0	0	0	0	0	0	0	5	0	0
10	MF	(Romania) Olimpiu Moruțan	3	0	0	1	0	0	0	0	0	4	0	0
10	FW	(Portugal) Thierry Moutinho	2	0	0	0	0	0	2	0	0	4	0	0
12	MF	(Romania) Ionuț Vînă	3	0	0	0	0	0	0	0	0	3	0	0
12	MF	(Romania) Dragoș Nedelcu	2	0	0	0	0	0	1	0	0	3	0	0
14	MF	(Romania) Lucian Filip	1	0	0	0	0	0	0	1	0	1	1	0
14	DF	(Bulgaria) Bozhidar Chorbadzhiyski	0	2	0	0	0	0	0	0	0	0	2	0
14	DF	(Romania) Andrei Marc	2	0	0	0	0	0	0	0	0	2	0	0
14	FW	(Romania) Adrian Popa	2	0	0	0	0	0	0	0	0	2	0	0
14	FW	(Romania) Darius Olaru	2	0	0	0	0	0	0	0	0	2	0	0
14	GK	(Romania) Andrei Vlad	0	0	0	2	0	0	0	0	0	2	0	0
14	DF	(Greece) Aristidis Soiledis	0	0	0	0	0	0	2	0	0	2	0	0
21	DF	(Romania) Mihai Bălașa	0	0	0	0	0	0	0	0	1	0	0	1
21	FW	(France) Harlem Gnohéré	1	0	0	0	0	0	0	0	0	1	0	0
21	GK	(Romania) Cristian Bălgrădean	1	0	0	0	0	0	0	0	0	1	0	0
21	DF	(Romania) Claudiu Belu	1	0	0	0	0	0	0	0	0	1	0	0
21	DF	(Romania) Marian Botezatu	1	0	0	0	0	0	0	0	0	1	0	0
21	FW	(Poland) Łukasz Gikiewicz	1	0	0	0	0	0	0	0	0	1	0	0
21	MF	(Romania) Mihai Roman	1	0	0	0	0	0	0	0	0	1	0	0
21	DF	(Romania) Sorin Șerban	1	0	0	0	0	0	0	0	0	1	0	0
21	FW	(Republic of the Congo) Juvhel Tsoumou	1	0	0	0	0	0	0	0	0	1	0	0
21	FW	(Romania) Ioan Hora	1	0	0	0	0	0	0	0	0	1	0	0
21	DF	(Romania) George Miron	0	0	0	1	0	0	0	0	0	1	0	0
21	MF	(Romania) Robert Ion	0	0	0	0	0	0	1	0	0	1	0	0
21	MF	(Romania) Mihai Pintilii	0	0	0	0	0	0	1	0	0	1	0	0
Total			79	4	2	7	0	0	23	1	1	109	5	3

=== Attendances ===
As of 8 March 2020

	Matches	Attendances	Average	High	Low
Liga I	14	91,032	6,502	30,235	0^{1}
Cupa României	0	0	0	0	0
Europa League	4	13,511	3,378	4,850	1,828
Total	18	104,543	5,808	30,235	0^{1}

^{1}Impact of the COVID-19 pandemic on association football

== UEFA Club rankings ==
This is the current UEFA Club Rankings, including season 2018–19.

Rank	Team	Points	Mvmnt
61	(Poland) Legia Warsaw	24.500	▼ (–2)
62	(Germany) Eintracht Frankfurt	24.000	▲ (+42)
63	(Ukraine) Dnipro	24.000	▼ (–19)
64	(Austria) Rapid Wien	23.500	▲ (+5)
65	(Greece) PAOK	23.500	▼ (–16)
66	(Romania) FCSB	23.000	▼ (–12)
67	(France) Saint-Étienne	23.000	▼ (–7)
68	(Turkey) Galatasaray	22.500	▼ (–17)
69	(Germany) RB Leipzig	22.000	▲ (+9)
70	(Azerbaijan) Qarabağ	22.000	▲ (+3)
71	(Netherlands) Feyenoord	22.000	▼ (–3)

== See also ==
- 2019–20 Cupa României
- 2019–20 Liga I
- 2019–20 UEFA Europa League
