= 2021–22 FCSB season =

FCSB
2021–22 season
- President: Valeriu Argăseală
- Manager: Dinu Todoran (until 18 August); Edward Iordănescu (until 14 November); Anton Petrea (from 16 November)
- Stadium: Arena Națională
- Liga I: 2nd
- Cupa României: Round of 16
- UEFA Europa Conference League: Second qualifying round
- Top goalscorer: League: Florin Tănase (20 goals); All: Florin Tănase (20 goals)
- Highest home attendance: 36,147 vs Dinamo București (12 September 2021, Liga I)
- Lowest home attendance: 0
- Average home league attendance: 8,023
Home colours	Away colours

The 2021–22 season is FCSB's 74th season since its founding in 1947.

== Previous season positions ==
	Competition	Position
(European Union)	UEFA Europa League	Third qualifying round
(Romania)	Liga I	2nd
(Romania)	Cupa României	Round of 16

== Players ==
=== First team squad ===
Note: Flags indicate national team as defined under FIFA eligibility rules; some limited exceptions apply. Players may hold more than one non-FIFA nationality.

No.	Pos.	Nation	Player
1	GK	ROU	Cătălin Straton
2	DF	ROU	Valentin Crețu
3	DF	ROU	Ionuț Panțîru
4	DF	ROU	Andrei Miron (Vice-captain)
7	FW	ROU	Florinel Coman
8	MF	ROU	Adrian Șut
9	MF	ROU	Octavian Popescu
10	FW	ROU	Florin Tănase (Captain)
13	FW	ROU	Andrei Dumiter
17	DF	ROU	Iulian Cristea
18	MF	FRA	Malcom Edjouma
19	FW	ROU	Ianis Stoica
20	FW	ROU	Andrei Burlacu
21	DF	ROU	Florin Achim

No.	Pos.	Nation	Player
22	FW	ROU	Valentin Gheorghe
23	MF	ROU	Ovidiu Popescu (4th captain)
25	MF	ROU	Ovidiu Perianu
26	MF	ROU	Răzvan Oaidă
27	MF	ROU	Darius Olaru
28	FW	ROU	Claudiu Keșerü (3rd captain)
30	MF	ROU	Alexandru Musi
31	FW	CRO	Ivan Mamut
32	GK	ROU	Ștefan Târnovanu
33	DF	MNE	Risto Radunović
55	DF	BRA	Paulo Vinícius
77	DF	ROU	Sorin Șerban
98	MF	ROU	Andrei Cordea
99	GK	ROU	Andrei Vlad

=== Transfers ===
==== In ====
No.	Pos.	Nat.	Name	Age	EU	Moving from	Type	Transfer window	Ends	Transfer fee	Source
40	DF	(Romania)	Ștefan Cană	20	EU	Politehnica Iași	Loan return	Summer	Undisclosed	—	
19	FW	(Romania)	Ianis Stoica	18	EU	Slatina	Loan return	Summer	2023	—	
22	FW	(Romania)	Cristian Dumitru	19	EU	Argeș Pitești	Loan return	Summer	2024	—	
30	MF	(Romania)	Alexandru Musi	16	EU	Youth system	Promoted	Summer	Undisclosed	—	
29	DF	(Austria)	Stipe Vučur	29	EU	Hallescher FC (Germany)	Transfer	Summer	2022	Free	
24	MF	(Romania)	Alexandru Crețu	29	EU	Maribor (Slovenia)	Transfer	Summer	2024	Free	
98	MF	(Romania)	Andrei Cordea	22	EU	Academica Clinceni	Transfer	Summer	2025	€50,000	
24	MF	(Romania)	Robert Ion	21	EU	Voluntari	Loan return	Summer	2023	—	
13	FW	(Czech Republic)	Zdeněk Ondrášek	32	EU	Viktoria Plzeň (Czech Republic)	Transfer	Summer	2022	Free	
13	FW	(Romania)	Andrei Dumiter	22	EU	Sepsi Sfântu Gheorghe	Transfer	Summer	2023	€350,000	
55	DF	(Brazil)	Paulo Vinícius	36	Non-EU	CFR Cluj	Transfer	Summer	2022	Free	
20	FW	(Romania)	Andrei Burlacu	24	EU	Universitatea Craiova	Transfer	Summer	2022	Free	
31	FW	(Croatia)	Ivan Mamut	24	EU	Universitatea Craiova	Transfer	Summer	2023	Free	
28	FW	(Romania)	Claudiu Keșerü	34	EU	Ludogorets Razgrad (Bulgaria)	Transfer	Summer	2023	Free	
22	FW	(Romania)	Valentin Gheorghe	24	EU	Astra Giurgiu	Transfer	Summer	2026	€250,000	
11	MF	(Romania)	Constantin Budescu	32	EU	Damac (Saudi Arabia)	Transfer	Summer	2023	Free	
16	MF	(Romania)	Dragoș Nedelcu	24	EU	Fortuna Düsseldorf (Germany)	Loan return	Winter		Free	
21	DF	(Romania)	Florin Achim	30	EU	Academica Clinceni	Transfer	Winter		Free	
18	MF	(France)	Malcom Edjouma	25	EU	Botoșani	Transfer	Winter	2026	€330,000	
	MF	(Romania)	Mihai Lixandru	20	EU	Gaz Metan Mediaș	Loan return	Winter	2025	Free	
	MF	(Romania)	Ovidiu Horșia	21	EU	Gaz Metan Mediaș	Loan return	Winter		Free	

==== Out ====
No.	Pos.	Nat.	Name	Age	EU	Moving to	Type	Transfer window	Transfer fee	Source
18	DF	(Greece)	Aristidis Soiledis	30	EU	Free agent	End of contract	Summer	Free	
8	MF	(Romania)	Lucian Filip	30	EU	Academica Clinceni	End of contract	Summer	Free	
9	FW	(Croatia)	Ante Vukušić	30	EU	Messina (Italy)	End of contract	Summer	Free	
21	FW	(Romania)	Alexandru Buziuc	27	EU	Mioveni	End of contract	Summer	Free	
40	DF	(Romania)	Ștefan Cană	20	EU	Politehnica Iași	Loan	Summer	Free	
29	MF	(Romania)	Andrei Pandele	17	EU	Metaloglobus București	Loan	Summer	Free	
24	MF	(Romania)	Robert Ion	20	EU	Voluntari	Loan	Summer	Free	
28	DF	(Romania)	Alexandru Pantea	17	EU	Hermannstadt	Loan	Summer	Free	
5	MF	(Romania)	Gabriel Simion	23	EU	Aris Limassol (Cyprus)	Loan	Summer	€100,000	
16	MF	(Romania)	Dragoș Nedelcu	24	EU	Fortuna Düsseldorf (Germany)	Loan	Summer	Free	
20	MF	(Romania)	Ionuț Vînă	26	EU	Universitatea Craiova	Transfer	Summer	Free	
22	FW	(Romania)	Cristian Dumitru	19	EU	Argeș Pitești	Loan	Summer	Free	
13	FW	(Czech Republic)	Zdeněk Ondrášek	32	EU	Tromsø (Norway)	Mutual termination	Summer	Free	
11	MF	(Romania)	Olimpiu Moruțan	22	EU	Galatasaray (Turkey)	Transfer	Summer	€3.500.000	
29	DF	(Austria)	Stipe Vučur	29	EU	Free agent	Mutual termination	Summer	Free	
5	MF	(Romania)	Alexandru Crețu	29	EU	Universitatea Craiova	Mutual termination	Summer	Free	
12	GK	(Romania)	Mihai Udrea	20	EU	Unirea Constanța	Loan	Summer	Free	
92	FW	(Romania)	Adrian Niță	18	EU	Unirea Constanța	Loan	Summer	Free	
24	MF	(Romania)	Robert Ion	21	EU	Academica Clinceni	Loan	Summer	Free	
11	MF	(Romania)	Constantin Budescu	32	EU	Voluntari	Mutual termination	Winter	Free	
6	DF	(Romania)	Denis Haruț	22	EU	Botoșani	Loan	Winter	Free	
16	MF	(Romania)	Dragoș Nedelcu	24	EU	Farul Constanța	Loan	Winter	Free	
	MF	(Romania)	Mihai Lixandru	20	EU	Mioveni	Loan	Winter	Free	

EU = if holds or not a European Union passport; Country: when 2 flags, 1st flag = country that plays for internationally, 2nd flag = country of birth; N = number on jersey; P = Position (for position name, pause mouse pointer on abbreviation); Name = Name on jersey (for more extensive name, pause mouse pointer on name); Age = age on the day of the signing; Moving from = only indicate the club the player was playing before start playing for this club in this season, for the type of the moving see Status column; Moving to = only indicates the club the player is going to play next, for the type of the moving see Status column; Ends = when the player's current contract ends; n/a = Not applicable.

==== Overall transfer activity ====
===== Expenditure =====
Summer: ▼€0,650,000

Winter: €0,330,000

Total: ▼€0,980,000

===== Income =====
Summer: ▲€3,600,000

Winter: €0,000,000

Total: ▲€3,600,000

===== Net Totals =====
Summer: ▲€2,950,000

Winter: €0,330,000

Total: ▲€2,620,000

== Friendly matches ==
Win Draw Loss

30 June 2021	FCSB (Romania)	5–1	(Romania) Viitorul Pandurii Târgu Jiu	Bucharest, Romania
EEST (UTC+3)	Ionuț Vînă 25'; Alexandru Musi 28'; Florin Tănase 45'; Ianis Stoica 57'; Octavian Popescu 64'		Paul Mitrică 40'	Stadium: Baza Sportivă FCSB; Attendance: 0

1 July 2021	FCSB (Romania)	4–1	(Romania) Concordia Chiajna	Bucharest, Romania
17:30 EEST (UTC+3)	Gabriel Simion 11'; Răzvan Oaidă 48'; Ionuț Vînă 58'; Cristian Dumitru 87'	Report	Hamza Younés 31'	Stadium: Baza Sportivă FCSB; Attendance: 0

3 July 2021	FCSB (Romania)	3–1	(Romania) Chindia Târgoviște	Bucharest, Romania
16:30 EEST (UTC+3)	Răzvan Oaidă 46', 52'; Olimpiu Moruțan 54'	Report	Daniel Florea 33'	Stadium: Baza Sportivă FCSB; Attendance: 0

7 July 2021	FCSB (Romania)	1–0	(Romania) Mioveni	Bucharest, Romania
18:00 EEST (UTC+3)	Cristian Dumitru 86'	Report		Stadium: Baza Sportivă FCSB; Attendance: 0

9 July 2021	Buzău (Romania)	1–5	(Romania) FCSB	Buzău, Romania
19:30 EEST (UTC+3)	Cristian Ciobanu 20' (pen.)	Report	Răzvan Oaidă 3'; Alexandru Musi 69'; Stipe Vučur 72'; Cristian Dumitru 75'; Ionuț Vînă 87' (pen.)	Stadium: Stadionul Municipal; Attendance: 5,000

4 September 2021	FCSB (Romania)	2–1	(Romania) Astra Giurgiu	Bucharest, Romania
11:00 EEST (UTC+3)	Valentin Gheorghe 16'; Claudiu Keșerü 21'	Report	Dragoș Gheorghe 29'	Stadium: Baza Sportivă FCSB; Attendance: 0

9 October 2021	FCSB (Romania)	2–0	(Romania) Astra Giurgiu	Bucharest, Romania
11:00 EEST (UTC+3)	Florin Tănase 3'; Răzvan Oaidă 48'	Report		Stadium: Baza Sportivă FCSB; Attendance: 0

15 January 2022	FCSB (Romania)	0–0	(Romania) Mioveni	Mogoșoaia, Romania
12:00 EEST (UTC+3)		Report		Stadium: Stadionul Mogoșoaia; Attendance: 0

== Competitions ==
Win Draw Loss

=== Overview ===
Competition	First match	Last match	Starting round	Final position	Record							
Competition	First match	Last match	Starting round	Final position	Pld	W	D	L	GF	GA	GD	Win %
Liga I	15 July 2021	22 May 2022	Matchday 1	2	40	26	9	5	78	35	+43	65.00
Cupa României	22 September 2021	27 October 2021	Round of 32	Round of 16	2	1	0	1	5	6	−1	50.00
Europa Conference League	22 July 2021	29 July 2022	Second qualifying round	Second qualifying round	2	1	0	1	2	2	+0	50.00
Total					44	28	9	7	85	43	+42	63.64

Last updated: 22 May 2022.
Source: Competitions

=== Liga I ===
==== Table ====
Pos	Team	Pld	W	D	L	GF	GA	GD	Pts	Qualification
1	CFR Cluj	30	24	4	2	48	16	+32	76	Qualification for the Play-off round
2	FCSB	30	18	8	4	54	28	+26	62	Qualification for the Play-off round
3	Universitatea Craiova	30	16	6	8	55	29	+26	54	Qualification for the Play-off round
4	Argeș Pitești	30	14	6	10	28	22	+6	48	Qualification for the Play-off round
5	Farul Constanța	30	14	6	10	42	21	+21	48	Qualification for the Play-off round

Source: LPF (in Romanian) Soccerway
Rules for classification: 1) Points; 2) Head-to-head points; 3) Head-to-head goal difference; 4) Head-to-head goals scored; 5) Goal difference; 6) Goals scored; 7) Play-off.

===== Results summary =====
Overall								Home						Away					
Pld	W	D	L	GF	GA	GD	Pts	W	D	L	GF	GA	GD	W	D	L	GF	GA	GD
30	18	8	4	54	28	+26	62	11	3	1	38	18	+20	7	5	3	16	10	+6

Last updated: 27 April 2022 (UTC).
Source: FCSB

==== Position by round ====
Round	1	2	3	4	5	6	7	8	9	10	11	12	13	14	15	16	17	18	19	20	21	22	23	24	25	26	27	28	29	30
Ground	A	H	A	H	A	H	A	H	A	H	A	H	A	H	A	H	A	H	A	H	A	H	A	H	A	H	A	H	A	H
Result	D	W	D	W	L	D	L	W	W	W	W	W	W	W	D	W	W	W	W	W	D	D	W	D	W	W	D	L	L	W
Position	7	3	5	4	4	6	8	7	6	4	3	2	2	2	2	2	2	2	2	2	2	2	2	2	2	2	2	2	2	2

Updated to match(es) played on 26 April 2022 (UTC). Source: Matches
A = Away; H = Home; W = Win; D = Draw; L = Loss

==== Results ====
15 July 2021 1	Botoșani	0–0	FCSB	Botoșani
20:30 EEST (UTC+03)	Alin Șeroni (yellow card) 37'; Martin Remacle (yellow card) 43'; Enriko Papa (yellow card) 60'	Report	Florin Tănase (penalty missed) 61'; Alexandru Musi (yellow card) 89'	Stadium: Stadionul Municipal; Attendance: 2,500; Referee: Sebastian Colțescu; Assistant referees: Daniel Mitrui; Adrian Popescu; Fourth official: Viorel Flueran

25 July 2021 2	FCSB	4–1	Universitatea Craiova	Bucharest
21:30 EEST (UTC+03)	Olimpiu Moruțan 7', (yellow card) 58'; Octavian Popescu 16'; Andrei Cordea 43'; Florin Tănase 60'	Report	Jovan Marković 64', (yellow card) 70'; Ștefan Vlădoiu (yellow card) 90+2'	Stadium: Arena Națională; Attendance: 10,123; Referee: István Kovács; Assistant referees: Vasile Marinescu; Ovidiu Artene; Fourth official: Marcel Bîrsan

1 August 2021 3	UTA Arad	1–1	FCSB	Arad
22:00 EEST (UTC+03)	Desley Ubbink 20'; Filip Dangubić (yellow card) 66'	Report	Olimpiu Moruțan (yellow card) 33'; Ianis Stoica 90'; Florinel Coman (yellow card) 90+3'	Stadium: Francisc von Neuman; Attendance: 10,000; Referee: Radu Petrescu; Assistant referees: Mircea Grigoriu; Marius Mihai Marica; Fourth official: Iulian Călin

8 August 2021 4	FCSB	2–1	Gaz Metan Mediaș	Bucharest
22:00 EEST (UTC+03)	Florin Tănase 13' (pen.); Florinel Coman (yellow card) 28'; Octavian Popescu 79'	Report	Octavian Vâlceanu (yellow card) 11'; Patricio Matricardi 24'; Gabriel Moura (yellow card) 28'; Diogo Izata (yellow card) 68'	Stadium: Arena Națională; Attendance: 2.345; Referee: Horia Mladinovici; Assistant referees: Daniel Mitruți; Cosmin Vatamanu; Fourth official: Viorel Flueran

15 August 2021 5	Rapid București	1–0	FCSB	Bucharest
21:30 EEST (UTC+03)	Cătălin Hlistei (yellow card) 27'; Paulo Vinícius 39' (o.g.); Nicolae Carnat (yellow card) 41'; Cristian Săpunaru (yellow card) 64'; Júnior Morais (yellow card) 82'; Claudiu Belu (yellow card) 85'; Antonio Sefer (red card) 85'	Report	Andrei Cordea (yellow card) 17'; Valentin Crețu (yellow card) 27'; Florin Tănase (yellow card) 65'; Sorin Șerban (yellow card) 68' (yellow-red card) 85'; Risto Radunović (yellow card) 73'	Stadium: Arena Națională; Attendance: 35,500; Referee: Marian Barbu; Assistant referees: Vasile Marinescu; Imre Bucsi; Fourth official: Lucian Rusandu

23 August 2021 6	FCSB	1–1	Sepsi Sfântu Gheorghe	Bucharest
21:30 EEST (UTC+03)	Ovidiu Popescu (yellow card) 10'; Florin Tănase 58'; Valentin Crețu (yellow card) 73'	Report	Adnan Aganović 36'; Branislav Niňaj (yellow card) 54'; Nicolae Păun (yellow card) 64'; Bogdan Mitrea (penalty missed) 67'; Marius Ștefănescu (yellow card) 68'	Stadium: Arena Națională; Attendance: 7,558; Referee: Horațiu Feșnic; Assistant referees: Valentin Avram; Alexandru Cerei; Fourth official: Iulian Călin

29 August 2021 7	CFR Cluj	4–1	FCSB	Cluj-Napoca
21:00 EEST (UTC+03)	Ciprian Deac (yellow card) 22', (goal) 67'; Billel Omrani 30'; Jonathan Rodríguez (yellow card) 51'; Rúnar Már Sigurjónsson 56'; Denis Alibec 73' (pen.); Cătălin Itu (yellow card) 89'	Report	Risto Radunović (yellow card) 18'; Ianis Stoica 90'	Stadium: Stadionul Dr. Constantin Rădulescu; Attendance: 10,000; Referee: Ovidiu Hațegan; Assistant referees: Adrian Ghinguleac; Mircea Grigoriu; Fourth official: Andrei Chivulete

12 September 2021 8	FCSB	6–0	Dinamo București	Bucharest
21:00 EEST (UTC+03)	Valentin Crețu (yellow card) 14'; Claudiu Keșerü 26', (yellow card) 63'; Octavian Popescu 43'; Paulo Vinícius 45+2'; Andrei Cordea 45+7' (pen.); Valentin Gheorghe 54'; Andrei Miron 67', (yellow card) 80'	Report	Cătălin Itu (yellow card) 25'; Steliano Filip (red card) 37'; Cosmin Matei (yellow card) 45+2'; Deian Sorescu (yellow card) 53'; Alexandru Răuță (yellow card) 61'	Stadium: Arena Națională; Attendance: 36,147; Referee: István Kovács; Assistant referees: Ovidiu Artene; Alexandru Cerei; Fourth official: Viorel Flueran

18 September 2021 9	FC U Craiova 1948	0–1	FCSB	Craiova
20:00 EEST (UTC+03)	Radu Negru (yellow card) 33'; Samuel Asamoah (yellow card) 55'; Andrea Compagno (yellow card) 90'	Report	Octavian Popescu (yellow card) 52'; Claudiu Keșerü 62' (pen.); Valentin Gheorghe (yellow card) 63'; Iulian Cristea (yellow card) 73'; Andrei Vlad (yellow card) 90+1'	Stadium: Ion Oblemenco; Attendance: 7,000; Referee: Iulian Călin; Assistant referees: Valentin Avram; Romică Bîrdeș; Fourth official: Sorin Antonie

25 September 2021 10	FCSB	3–2	Academica Clinceni	Bucharest
21:00 EEST (UTC+02)	Claudiu Keșerü 3'; Paulo Vinícius 10'; Adrian Șut (yellow card) 11'; Ianis Stoica (yellow card) 65', (goal) 66'; Constantin Budescu (yellow card) 90+3'	Report	Thibault Moulin (yellow card) 40'; Michael Omoh 45'; Juan Cascini 89'; Amir Bilali (yellow card) 90+1'	Stadium: Arena Națională; Attendance: 3,783; Referee: Andrei Chivulete; Assistant referees: Vladimir Urzică; Raul Ghiciulescu; Fourth official: Lucian Rusandu

1 October 2021 11	Chindia Târgoviște	0–1	FCSB	Ploiești
21:00 EEST (UTC+03)	Milan Kocić (red card) 8'; Daniel Florea (yellow card) 9'; Doru Popadiuc (yellow card) 25'; Laurențiu Corbu (yellow card) 82'; Paul Iacob (yellow card) 90+5'	Report	Risto Radunović (yellow card) 21'; Ovidiu Popescu (yellow card) 68'; Darius Olaru (yellow card) 71'; Constantin Budescu (yellow card) 81', (goal) 90+7' (pen.); Valentin Gheorghe (yellow card) 88'	Stadium: Ilie Oană; Attendance: 3,500; Referee: Lucian Rusandu; Assistant referees: Bogdan Gheorghe; Imre Bucsi; Fourth official: Iulian Dima

16 October 2021 12	FCSB	3–0	Mioveni	Buzău
20:30 EEST (UTC+03)	Florin Tănase 56' (pen.); Andrei Dumiter 65'; Claudiu Keșerü 69'; Alexandru Musi (yellow card) 89'	Report	Alexandru Buziuc (yellow card) 29' (yellow-red card) 45+1'	Stadium: Stadionul Municipal; Attendance: 500; Referee: Marcel Bîrsan; Assistant referees: Valentin Avram; Marius Marchidanu; Fourth official: Marian Barbu

31 October 2021 14	FCSB	2–1	Argeș Pitești	Buzău
20:30 EEST (UTC+03)	Răzvan Oaidă (yellow card) 33'; Octavian Popescu 67'; Valentin Gheorghe 71'	Report	Martin Raynov 62', (yellow card) 90'; David Meza (yellow card) 65'; Iasmin Latovlevici (yellow card) 82'; Ionuț Șerban (yellow card) 90+1'	Stadium: Stadionul Municipal; Attendance: 0 Referee: Sorin Antonie; Assistant referees: Bogdan Gheorghe; Imre Bucsi; Fourth official: Adrian Cojocaru

4 November 2021 13	Farul Constanța	0–1	FCSB	Ovidiu
20:30 EEST (UTC+03)	Virgil Ghiță (yellow card) 71'	Report	Constantin Grameni 13' (o.g.); Risto Radunović (yellow card) 45'	Stadium: Stadionul Viitorul; Attendance: 0 Referee: Ionuț Coza; Assistant referees: Ionel Dumitru; Ionuț Bobe; Fourth official: Cătălin Popa

7 November 2021 15	Voluntari	0–0	FCSB	Voluntari
21:30 EEST (UTC+03)	Marius Briceag (yellow card) 17'; Marcelo Lopes (yellow card) 90+1'	Report	Constantin Budescu (yellow card) 12'; Adrian Șut (yellow card) 69'; Florin Tănase (yellow card) 77'; Octavian Popescu (yellow card) 77'	Stadium: Anghel Iordănescu; Attendance: 0 Referee: George Găman; Assistant referees: George Florin Neacșu; Ferencz Tunyogi; Fourth official: Horia Mladinovici

21 November 2021 16	FCSB	3–1	Botoșani	Bucharest
20:30 EEST (UTC+03)	Adrian Șut (yellow card) 41'; Valentin Gheorghe 77'; Ianis Stoica 86'; Florin Tănase 90+4'	Report	Christopher Braun 24'; Realdo Fili (yellow card) 29'; Alexandru Țigănașu (yellow card) 90+2'	Stadium: Arena Națională; Attendance: 0 Referee: Horia Mladinovici; Assistant referees: Daniel Mitruți; Cosmin Vatamanu; Fourth official: Bogdan Dumitrache

28 November 2021 17	Universitatea Craiova	2–3	FCSB	Craiova
21:15 EEST (UTC+03)	Andrei Ivan 13' (pen.); Nicușor Bancu (yellow card) 15'; Marius Constantin (yellow card) 37'; George Cîmpanu 57'; Dan Nistor (yellow card) 60'; Lyes Houri (yellow card) 86'	Report	Andrei Dumiter 16', (yellow card) 44'; Adrian Șut 39'; Risto Radunović (yellow card) 62'; Andrei Cordea 90+1'	Stadium: Ion Oblemenco; Attendance: 9,200; Referee: Horațiu Feșnic; Assistant referees: Valentin Avram; Alexandru Cerei; Fourth official: Cătălin Popa

5 December 2021 18	FCSB	2–1	UTA Arad	Bucharest
21:30 EEST (UTC+03)	Florin Tănase 22' (pen.), 81' (pen.); Octavian Popescu (yellow card) 69'	Report	Dragoș Balauru (yellow card) 24'; Modestas Vorobjovas (yellow card) 32'; Roger 72'; Vinko Međimorec (yellow card) 80'	Stadium: Arena Națională; Attendance: 0 Referee: Marian Barbu; Assistant referees: Mircea Orbuleț; George Florin Neacșu; Fourth official: Viorel Flueran

11 December 2021 19	Gaz Metan Mediaș	0–1	FCSB	Mediaș
20:30 EEST (UTC+03)	Raul Șteau (yellow card) 28'; Răzvan Grădinaru (yellow card) 81'; Francisco Júnior (yellow card) 90'	Report	Darius Olaru 59'; Andrei Miron (yellow card) 80'; Andrei Vlad (yellow card) 90+2'	Stadium: Gaz Metan; Attendance: 2,500; Referee: Cătălin Popa; Assistant referees: Ovidiu Artene; Florin Vișan; Fourth official: Andrei Chivulete

15 December 2021 20	FCSB	3–1	Rapid București	Bucharest
20:30 EEST (UTC+03)	Florin Tănase 14', 90+3' (pen.); Octavian Popescu (yellow card) 43'; Risto Radunović (yellow card) 45+5'; Ianis Stoica 90+6'	Report	Cristian Săpunaru (yellow card) 37', (goal) 45+6' (pen.); Júnior Morais (yellow card) 40' (yellow-red card) 76'; Alexandru Albu (yellow card) 44'	Stadium: Arena Națională; Attendance: 20,157; Referee: István Kovács; Assistant referees: Vasile Marinescu; Mihai Marius Marica; Fourth official: Iulian Călin

19 December 2021 21	Sepsi Sfântu Gheorghe	0–0	FCSB	Sfântu Gheorghe
20:30 EEST (UTC+03)	Branislav Niňaj (yellow card) 45+1'; Eder González (yellow card) 51'; Marius Ștefănescu (yellow card) 78'	Report	Darius Olaru (yellow card) 8'; Risto Radunović (yellow card) 21'; Valentin Crețu (yellow card) 27'; Andrei Miron (yellow card) 74'; Ovidiu Popescu (yellow card) 80'	Stadium: Sepsi Arena; Attendance: 4,200; Referee: Adrian Cojocaru; Assistant referees: Mircea Grigoroiu; Alexandru Vodă; Fourth official: Cătălin Popa

23 January 2022 22	FCSB	3–3	CFR Cluj	Bucharest
20:00 EEST (UTC+03)	Octavian Popescu 24'; Denis Haruț (yellow card) 30'; Ovidiu Popescu (yellow card) 35'; Adrian Șut (yellow card) 40'; Darius Olaru (yellow card) 68'; Valentin Gheorghe 71'; Iulian Cristea 90+3'	Report	Adrian Păun (yellow card) 28'; Gabriel Debeljuh 36', 40'; Alexandru Chipciu 77'; Ciprian Deac (yellow card) 83'	Stadium: Arena Națională; Attendance: 14,000; Referee: Sebastian Colțescu; Assistant referees: Mircea Grigoroiu; Daniel Mitruți; Fourth official: Adrian Costreie

30 January 2022 23	Dinamo București	0–3	FCSB	Bucharest
20:00 EEST (UTC+03)	Marco Ehmann (yellow card) 16'; Cosmin Matei (yellow card) 19'; Alexandru Răuță (yellow card) 29' (yellow-red card) 35'; Jonathan Rodríguez (yellow card) 54'	Report	Octavian Popescu 2'; Florin Tănase (yellow card) 31'; Ianis Stoica 75'; Răzvan Oaidă 81'; Ovidiu Perianu (yellow card) 90+1'	Stadium: Dinamo; Attendance: 5,000; Referee: Ovidiu Hațegan; Assistant referees: Adrian Ghinguleac; Sebastian Gheorghe; Fourth official: Iulian Dima

6 February 2022 24	FCSB	2–2	FC U Craiova 1948	Bucharest
19:55 EEST (UTC+03)	Adrian Șut (yellow card) 37'; Răzvan Oaidă 66', (yellow card) 75'; Iulian Cristea (yellow card) 73' (yellow-red card) 90+6'; Claudiu Keșerü 90+2' (pen.)	Report	Claudiu Bălan 41'; Jérémy Huyghebaert (yellow card) 61'; Vlad Achim (yellow card) 71'; Radu Negru (yellow card) 71'; William Baeten 76'	Stadium: Arena Națională; Attendance: 7,385; Referee: István Kovács; Assistant referees: Ovidiu Artene; Marius Badea; Fourth official: Lucian Rusandu

9 February 2022 25	Academica Clinceni	0–3	FCSB	Giurgiu
19:55 EEST (UTC+02)	Vladimir Gogov (yellow card) 24'; Pavel Čmovš (yellow card) 48'; Agron Rufati (yellow card) 64'; Thibault Moulin (yellow card) 65'; Ovidiu Sterian (yellow card) 85' (yellow-red card) 88'	Report	Andrei Cordea 5'; Florin Tănase 19', 49' (pen.); Matei Tănasă (yellow card) 76'; Andrei Burlacu (yellow card) 82'	Stadium: Marin Anastasovici; Attendance: 500; Referee: Florin Andrei; Assistant referees: Vlad Bârleanu; Mihăiță Necula; Fourth official: Bogdan Dumitrache

13 February 2022 26	FCSB	3–2	Chindia Târgoviște	Bucharest
19:55 EEST (UTC+03)	Iulian Cristea (yellow card) 14'; Darius Olaru 47'; Valentin Gheorghe 67', 77'	Report	Daniel Popa 15', (yellow card) 90+4'; Mihai Butean 21'; Doru Popadiuc (yellow card) 73'; Laurențiu Corbu (yellow card) 90'	Stadium: Arena Națională; Attendance: 0 Referee: Andrei Chivulete; Assistant referees: Andrei Constantinescu; Ferencz Tunyogi; Fourth official: Adrian Costreie

19 February 2022 27	Mioveni	1–1	FCSB	Mioveni
19:55 EEST (UTC+03)	Ionuț Balaur 45+1'; Ionuț Burnea (yellow card) 69'; Alexandru Raicea (yellow card) 77'; Andrei Panait (yellow card) 84'; Guilherme Garutti (yellow card) 90+5'; Ionuț Rădescu (yellow card) 90+6'	Report	Malcom Edjouma 7', (yellow card) 38'; Sorin Șerban (yellow card) 44'	Stadium: Stadionul Orășenesc; Attendance: 4,000; Referee: George Găman; Assistant referees: Marius Badea; Alexandru Filip; Fourth official: Ionuț Coza

27 February 2022 28	FCSB	0–2	Farul Constanța	Bucharest
21:00 EEST (UTC+03)	Florin Tănase (yellow card) 55'; Octavian Popescu (yellow card) 64'	Report	Jefté Betancor 41'; Virgil Ghiță 59'	Stadium: Arena Națională; Attendance: 7,000; Referee: Radu Petrescu; Assistant referees: Adrian Ghinguleac; Bogdan Gheorghe; Fourth official: Florin Andrei

3 March 2022 29	Argeș Pitești	1–0	FCSB	Pitești
21:00 EEST (UTC+03)	George Ganea 16'; Alexandru Greab (yellow card) 50'; Alexandru Ișfan (yellow card) 87'; Denis Dumitrașcu (yellow card) 90'	Report	Andrei Cordea (yellow card) 58'; Ovidiu Perianu (yellow card) 75'	Stadium: Nicolae Dobrin; Attendance: 4,500; Referee: Ovidiu Hațegan; Assistant referees: Mircea Grigoroiu; Sebastian Gheorghe; Fourth official: George Găman

6 March 2022 30	FCSB	1–0	Voluntari	Bucharest
20:30 EEST (UTC+03)	Florin Tănase (yellow card) 76'; Octavian Popescu 90+4'	Report	Igor Armaș (yellow card) 18'; Hélder Tavares (yellow card) 74'; Cristian Costin (yellow card) 90+3'	Stadium: Arena Națională; Attendance: 3,000; Referee: Adrian Cojocaru; Assistant referees: Vladimir Urzică; Alexandru Cerei; Fourth official: Cătălin Popa

==== Championship round ====
===== Table =====
Pos	Team	Pld	W	D	L	GF	GA	GD	Pts	Qualification	CFR	FCS	UCV	VOL	FAR	ARG
1	CFR Cluj (C)	10	6	1	3	18	9	+9	57	Qualification to Champions League first qualifying round		0–1	2–1	3–1	1–0	2–0
2	FCSB	10	8	1	1	24	7	+17	56	Qualification to Europa Conference League second qualifying round	3–1		0–2	4–0	2–0	4–0
3	Universitatea Craiova (O)	10	7	0	3	22	9	+13	48	Qualification to European competition play-offs	3–2	0–1		1–0	4–1	3–0
4	Voluntari	10	3	2	5	9	14	−5	35		0–1	2–2	3–1		1–0	0–1
5	Farul Constanța	10	2	2	6	5	16	−11	32		0–0	0–4	0–3	1–1		1–0
6	Argeș Pitești	10	1	0	9	3	26	−23	27		0–6	2–3	0–4	0–1	0–2	

Source: Soccerway, FRF (in Romanian), LPF (in Romanian)
Legend: Blue = home team win; Yellow = draw; Red = away team win.
Rules for classification: 1) Points; 2) Points without rounding; 3) Head-to-head points; 4) Head-to-head goal difference; 5) Head-to-head goals scored; 6) Goal difference; 7) Goals scored; 8) Play-off (only if needed to decide champion or teams for UEFA competitions). (Note: only criteria 6 and 7 are applied to establish the classification during the competition.)
(C) Champions; (O) Play-off winners

===== Results summary =====
Overall								Home						Away					
Pld	W	D	L	GF	GA	GD	Pts	W	D	L	GF	GA	GD	W	D	L	GF	GA	GD
10	8	1	1	24	7	+17	25	4	0	1	13	3	+10	4	1	0	11	4	+7

Source: Liga I

===== Position by round =====
Round	1	2	3	4	5	6	7	8	9	10
Ground	H	A	H	H	A	A	H	A	A	H
Result	W	W	L	W	W	W	W	W	D	W
Position	2	2	2	2	2	2	2	2	2	2

Source: Liga I
A = Away; H = Home; W = Win; D = Draw; L = Loss

===== Matches =====
Win Draw Loss

14 March 2022 1	FCSB	2–0	Farul Constanța	Bucharest
21:00 EEST (UTC+03)	Florin Tănase (yellow card) 30'; Darius Olaru (yellow card) 38'; Malcom Edjouma 66'; Octavian Popescu (yellow card) 77', (goal) 85'	Report	Ionuț Larie (yellow card) 24'; Florin Purece (yellow card) 75'; Damien Dussaut (yellow card) 78' (yellow-red card) 78'	Stadium: Arena Națională; Attendance: 2,500; Referee: Lucian Rusandu; Assistant referees: Daniel Mitruți; Ciprian Danșa; Fourth official: Iulian Dima

20 March 2022 2	Argeș Pitești	2–3	FCSB	Pitești
19:00 EEST (UTC+03)	Denis Dumitrașcu (yellow card) 7'; Ionuț Șerban 43' (pen.), (red card) 69'; Martin Raynov (yellow card) 53'; Said Ahmed (yellow card) 69', (goal) 72' (pen.); George Ganea (yellow card) 70'	Report	Andrei Cordea (yellow card) 19'; Florin Tănase 39', 56' (pen.), (yellow card) 69'; Ivan Mamut (yellow card) 42'; Octavian Popescu (yellow card) 78'; Andrei Dumiter 90+4'	Stadium: Nicolae Dobrin; Attendance: 12,000; Referee: Horia Mladinovici; Assistant referees: Mircea Orbuleț; Marius Badea; Fourth official: Marcel Bîrsan

3 April 2022 3	FCSB	0–2	Universitatea Craiova	Bucharest
19:00 EEST (UTC+03)	Risto Radunović (yellow card) 45'; Valentin Crețu (yellow card) 68'	Report	Alexandru Crețu (yellow card) 29'; Paul Papp (yellow card) 42'; Gustavo (yellow card) 45'; Andrei Ivan 45+1' (pen.); David Lazar (yellow card) 62'; Jovan Marković (yellow card) 68'; Ovidiu Bic 74'	Stadium: Arena Națională; Attendance: 24,500; Referee: Horațiu Feșnic; Assistant referees: Mircea Grigoroiu; Sebastian Gheorghe; Fourth official: Iulian Dima

11 April 2022 4	FCSB	4–0	Voluntari	Bucharest
21:00 EEST (UTC+03)	Darius Olaru 5'; Ianis Stoica 26'; Ivan Mamut (yellow card) 34'; Risto Radunović (yellow card) 42'; Adrian Șut (yellow card) 66'; Florin Tănase 70', 78'; Florinel Coman (yellow card) 90+2'	Report	Adam Nemec (yellow card) 40'	Stadium: Arena Națională; Attendance: 2,000; Referee: Sebastian Colțescu; Assistant referees: Vladimir Urzică; Ciprian Danșa; Fourth official: Adrian Costreie

17 April 2022 5	CFR Cluj	0–1	FCSB	Cluj-Napoca
20:30 EEST (UTC+03)	Mateo Sušić (red card) 43'; Camora (yellow card) 50'; Nana Boateng (yellow card) 69'; Yuri Matias (yellow card) 86'	Report	Adrian Șut (yellow card) 26'; Andrei Cordea (yellow card) 67'; Octavian Popescu 74', (yellow card) 75'; Florin Tănase (yellow card) 79'; Ștefan Târnovanu (yellow card) 88'; Valentin Gheorghe (yellow card) 90+3'	Stadium: Stadionul Dr. Constantin Rădulescu; Attendance: 16,000; Referee: István Kovács; Assistant referees: Vasile Marinescu; Daniel Mitruți; Fourth official: Sebastian Colțescu

25 April 2022 6	Farul Constanța	0–4	FCSB	Ovidiu
21:00 EEST (UTC+03)	Gabriel Iancu (yellow card) 30'; Damien Dussaut (yellow card) 32'; Sebastian Mladen (yellow card) 46'	Report	Florin Tănase 24', 40' (pen.), 67'; Darius Olaru 34'	Stadium: Viitorul; Attendance: 4,500; Referee: Marcel Bîrsan; Assistant referees: Mircea Grigoroiu; Marius Mihai Marica; Fourth official: Sorin Antonie

2 May 2022 7	FCSB	4–0	Argeș Pitești	Bucharest
20:30 EEST (UTC+03)	Florin Tănase 8' (pen.); Ștefan Târnovanu (yellow card) 26'; Darius Olaru 34', 83'; Iulian Cristea 65'; Florinel Coman (yellow card) 71'	Report	Ahmed Said (yellow card) 28'; Martin Raynov (yellow card) 55'	Stadium: Arena Națională; Attendance: 11,457; Referee: Ionuț Coza; Assistant referees: Sebastian Gheorghe; Adrian Ghinguleac; Fourth official: George Găman

8 May 2022 8	Universitatea Craiova	0–1	FCSB	Craiova
19:30 EEST (UTC+03)	Gustavo (yellow card) 56'	Report	Risto Radunović (yellow card) 11'; Ivan Mamut 86'; Darius Olaru (yellow card) 90+5'	Stadium: Ion Oblemenco; Attendance: 30,000; Referee: István Kovács; Assistant referees: Vasile Marinescu; Ovidiu Artene; Fourth official: Adrian Cojocaru

14 May 2022 9	Voluntari	2–2	FCSB	Bucharest
21:00 EEST (UTC+03)	Adam Nemec (yellow card) 33', (goal) 45+2'; Alexandru Vlad (yellow card) 58'; Lukáš Droppa (yellow card) 60'; Cosmin Achim (yellow card) 85'; Cristian Costin 88'; Mihai Popa (yellow card) 90+4'	Report	Andrei Miron (yellow card) 23'; Andrei Cordea 44'; Florin Tănase 71'	Stadium: Arena Națională; Attendance: 8,614; Referee: Horațiu Feșnic; Assistant referees: Valentin Avram; Ferencz Tunyogi; Fourth official: Iulian Dima

22 May 2022 10	FCSB	3–1	CFR Cluj	Buzău
21:30 EEST (UTC+03)	Octavian Popescu 30'; Adrian Șut 64', 87'; Ianis Stoica (yellow card) 68'; Risto Radunović (yellow card) 69'; Valentin Gheorghe (yellow card) 71'; Ovidiu Popescu (yellow card) 89'	Report	Kristian Dimitrov 45'; Yuri Matias (yellow card) 68'; Ciprian Deac (yellow card) 69'	Stadium: Municipal; Attendance: 8,000; Referee: Adrian Cojocaru; Assistant referees: Ciprian Danșa; Daniel Mitruți; Fourth official: Horia Mladinovici

=== Cupa României ===
22 September 2021 Round of 32	Hunedoara	3–5 (a.e.t.)	FCSB	Hunedoara
21:00 EET (UTC+02)	Antonio Vlad 58', (yellow card) 101'; Andrei Hergheligiu 70'; Flavius Iacob (yellow card) 81'; Petre Simon 83'	Report	Ianis Stoica 19', 50'; Darius Olaru (yellow card) 25'; Răzvan Oaidă 31'; Andrei Miron (yellow card) 66'; Alexandru Musi 95'; Valentin Gheorghe 98'	Stadium: Stadionul Michael Klein; Attendance: 6,000; Referee: Rareș Vidican; Assistant referees: Alexandru Corb; Răzvan Tudor; Fourth official: Claudiu Gaitin

27 October 2021 Round of 16	Voluntari	3–0	FCSB	Voluntari
21:00 EET (UTC+02)		Report		Stadium: Stadionul Anghel Iordănescu

=== UEFA Europa Conference League ===
==== Second qualifying rounds ====
22 July 2021 First leg	FCSB (Romania)	1–0	(Kazakhstan) Shakhter Karagandy	Bucharest, Romania
21:30 EEST (UTC+03)	Andrei Cordea 38'; Alexandru Crețu (yellow card) 59'; Ovidiu Popescu (yellow card) 88'	Report	Vuk Mitošević (yellow card) 24'; Vladimir Khozin (yellow card) 33'	Stadium: Arena Națională; Attendance: 5,812; Referee: Vasilis Dimitriou (Cyprus); Assistant referees: Nikos Egglezou, Paulos Georgiou; Fourth official: Giorgos Nikolaou

29 July 2021 Second leg	Shakhter Karagandy (Kazakhstan)	2–1 (a.e.t.) (5–3 p)	(Romania) FCSB	Yerevan, Armenia
16:00 EEST (UTC+03)	Mikhail Gabyshev 11'; Aydos Tattybayev 90+1', (yellow card) 103'; Edin Rustemović (yellow card) 108'; David Mawutor (yellow card) 120+1'	Report	Stipe Vučur (yellow card) 35'; Florinel Coman (yellow card) 56', (goal) 76'; Sorin Șerban (yellow card) 87'; Andrei Cordea (yellow card) 108'	Stadium: Vazgen Sargsyan Republican Stadium; Attendance: 0 Referee: Dragomir Draganov; Assistant referees: Petar Dzhuganski, Martin Dimitrov (Bulgaria); Fourth official: Stanislav Todorov
	Penalties
	Rustemović (penalty scored); Bukorac (penalty scored); Graf (penalty scored); Atanaskoski (penalty scored); Tattybayev (penalty scored)		(penalty scored) Coman; (penalty scored) Al. Crețu; (penalty missed) Moruțan; (penalty scored) Vučur

== Statistics ==
=== Goalscorers ===
As of 22 May 2022

Rank	Position	Name	Liga I	Cupa României	Europa Conference League	Total
1	FW	(Romania) Florin Tănase	20	0	0	20
2	MF	(Romania) Octavian Popescu	10	0	0	10
3	FW	(Romania) Ianis Stoica	7	2	0	9
4	FW	(Romania) Valentin Gheorghe	6	1	0	7
5	MF	(Romania) Darius Olaru	6	0	0	6
5	MF	(Romania) Andrei Cordea	5	0	1	6
6	FW	(Romania) Claudiu Keșerü	5	0	0	5
7	FW	(Romania) Andrei Dumiter	3	0	0	3
7	MF	(Romania) Adrian Șut	3	0	0	3
7	MF	(Romania) Răzvan Oaidă	2	1	0	3
8	MF	(France) Malcom Edjouma	2	0	0	2
8	DF	(Brazil) Paulo Vinícius	2	0	0	2
8	DF	(Romania) Iulian Cristea	2	0	0	2
9	MF	(Romania) Constantin Budescu	1	0	0	1
9	FW	(Romania) Florinel Coman	0	0	1	1
9	MF	(Romania) Olimpiu Moruțan	1	0	0	1
9	DF	(Romania) Andrei Miron	1	0	0	1
9	MF	(Romania) Alexandru Musi	0	1	0	1
9	FW	(Croatia) Ivan Mamut	1	0	0	1

=== Goal minutes ===
	1'–15'	16'–30'	31'–HT	46'–60'	61'–75'	76'–FT	Extra time	Forfeit
Goals	12	9	12	9	18	23	2	0
Percentage	14.12%	10.59%	14.12%	10.59%	21.18%	27.06%	2.35%	0%

Last updated: 22 May 2022 (UTC)
Source: FCSB (in Romanian)

=== Clean sheets ===
As of 22 May 2022

Rank	Name	Liga I	Cupa României	Europa Conference League	Total	Games played
1	(Romania) Andrei Vlad	10	0	1	11	29
2	(Romania) Ștefan Târnovanu	8	0	0	8	13

=== Disciplinary record ===
As of 22 May 2022

Rank	Position	Name	Liga I			Cupa României			Europa Conference League			Total		
Rank	Position	Name	Booked	(yellow card) (yellow-red card)	Sent off (straight red)	Booked	(yellow card) (yellow-red card)	Sent off (straight red)	Booked	(yellow card) (yellow-red card)	Sent off (straight red)	Booked	(yellow card) (yellow-red card)	Sent off (straight red)
1	DF	(Montenegro) Risto Radunović	11	0	0	0	0	0	0	0	0	11	0	0
2	MF	(Romania) Octavian Popescu	8	0	0	0	0	0	0	0	0	8	0	0
2	FW	(Romania) Florin Tănase	8	0	0	0	0	0	0	0	0	8	0	0
3	MF	(Romania) Adrian Șut	7	0	0	0	0	0	0	0	0	7	0	0
4	MF	(Romania) Ovidiu Popescu	5	0	0	0	0	0	1	0	0	6	0	0
4	MF	(Romania) Darius Olaru	5	0	0	1	0	0	0	0	0	6	0	0
5	DF	(Romania) Valentin Crețu	5	0	0	0	0	0	0	0	0	5	0	0
5	FW	(Romania) Florinel Coman	4	0	0	0	0	0	1	0	0	5	0	0
5	MF	(Romania) Andrei Cordea	4	0	0	0	0	0	1	0	0	5	0	0
5	DF	(Romania) Andrei Miron	4	0	0	1	0	0	0	0	0	5	0	0
6	DF	(Romania) Iulian Cristea	2	1	0	0	0	0	0	0	0	2	1	0
6	DF	(Romania) Sorin Șerban	1	1	0	0	0	0	1	0	0	2	1	0
6	FW	(Romania) Valentin Gheorghe	4	0	0	0	0	0	0	0	0	4	0	0
7	MF	(Romania) Constantin Budescu	3	0	0	0	0	0	0	0	0	3	0	0
8	MF	(Romania) Olimpiu Moruțan	2	0	0	0	0	0	0	0	0	2	0	0
8	MF	(Romania) Alexandru Musi	2	0	0	0	0	0	0	0	0	2	0	0
8	GK	(Romania) Andrei Vlad	2	0	0	0	0	0	0	0	0	2	0	0
8	MF	(Romania) Răzvan Oaidă	2	0	0	0	0	0	0	0	0	2	0	0
8	GK	(Romania) Ștefan Târnovanu	2	0	0	0	0	0	0	0	0	2	0	0
8	MF	(Romania) Ovidiu Perianu	2	0	0	0	0	0	0	0	0	2	0	0
8	FW	(Croatia) Ivan Mamut	2	0	0	0	0	0	0	0	0	2	0	0
8	FW	(Romania) Ianis Stoica	2	0	0	0	0	0	0	0	0	2	0	0
9	DF	(Austria) Stipe Vučur	0	0	0	0	0	0	1	0	0	1	0	0
9	MF	(Romania) Alexandru Crețu	0	0	0	0	0	0	1	0	0	1	0	0
9	FW	(Romania) Claudiu Keșerü	1	0	0	0	0	0	0	0	0	1	0	0
9	FW	(Romania) Andrei Dumiter	1	0	0	0	0	0	0	0	0	1	0	0
9	DF	(Romania) Denis Haruț	1	0	0	0	0	0	0	0	0	1	0	0
9	MF	(France) Malcom Edjouma	1	0	0	0	0	0	0	0	0	1	0	0
9	MF	(Romania) Matei Tănasă	1	0	0	0	0	0	0	0	0	1	0	0
9	FW	(Romania) Andrei Burlacu	1	0	0	0	0	0	0	0	0	1	0	0

=== Attendances ===
As of 22 May 2022

	Matches	Attendances	Average	High	Low
Liga I	20	160,455	8,023	36,147	0^{1}
Cupa României	0	0	0	0	0
Europa Conference League	1	5,812	5,812	5,812	5,812
Total	21	166,267	7,917	36,147	0^{1}

^{1}Impact of the COVID-19 pandemic on association football

== See also ==
- 2021–22 Cupa României
- 2021–22 Liga I
- 2021–22 UEFA Europa Conference League
