= Sterian =

Sterian is a Romanian surname. Notable people with the surname include:

- Eraclie Sterian (1872–1948), Romanian physician, writer, and political activist
- Ovidiu Sterian (born 2004), Romanian footballer
- Paul Sterian (1904–1984), Romanian poet and civil servant
- Soare Sterian (1906–1970), Romanian rugby union player
- Valeriu Sterian (1952–2000), Romanian folk and rock musician

== See also ==
- Styria (disambiguation)
