= Steyermark =

Steyermark is:

- A historical spelling of Steiermark, the German name for the former duchy and current state and region of Styria
- A surname
  - Julian Alfred Steyermark, an American botanist whose standard author abbreviation is Steyerm.
