= Styrian =

Styrian may refer to:

- Adjective for Styria
- Styrian dialect group

== See also ==
- Styria (disambiguation)
