= Răzvan Oaidă =

Romanian footballer (born 1998)

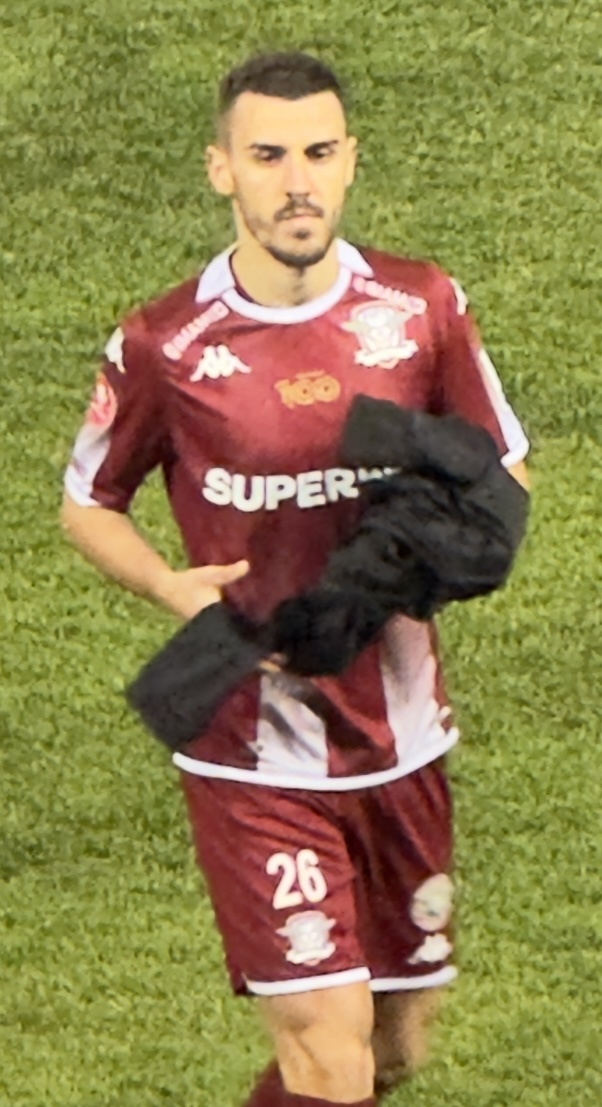
- Oaidă with Rapid București in 2023

Personal information
- Full name: Răzvan Constantin Oaidă
- Date of birth: 2 March 1998 (age 28)
- Place of birth: Petroșani, Romania
- Height: 1.82 m (6 ft 0 in)
- Position: Midfielder

Team information
- Current team: UTA Arad
- Number: 26

Youth career
- Jiul Petroșani
- –2014: Atletico Arad
- 2014–2016: Wolverhampton Wanderers
- 2016–2017: Brescia

Senior career*
Years	Team	Apps	(Gls)
2017–2019	Botoșani	46	(1)
2019–2023	FCSB	98	(5)
2023–2024	Rapid București	42	(1)
2024–2025	Universitatea Cluj	7	(0)
2026–	UTA Arad	2	(0)

International career
2014–2015	Romania U17	6	(0)
2016	Romania U18	1	(0)
2016–2017	Romania U19	10	(0)
2017–2021	Romania U21	10	(0)
- * Club domestic league appearances and goals as of 24 July 2026

Răzvan Constantin Oaidă (born 2 March 1998) is a Romanian professional footballer who plays as a midfielder for Liga I club UTA Arad.

== Club career ==
On 25 February 2019, FCSB owner Gigi Becali announced the transfer of Oaidă from fellow Liga I team Botoșani for a €700,000 fee, with the player due to join the squad in the summer.

On 29 May 2023, Oaidă moved to cross-town rivals Rapid București on a two-year contract.

== Career statistics ==
=== Club ===
As of match played 24 July 2026

Appearances and goals by club, season and competition
Club	Season	League			Cupa României		Continental		Other		Total	
Club	Season	Division	Apps	Goals	Apps	Goals	Apps	Goals	Apps	Goals	Apps	Goals
Botoșani	2017–18	Liga I	21	0	4	0	—		—		25	0
Botoșani	2018–19	Liga I	25	1	1	0	—		—		26	1
Botoșani	Total		46	1	5	0	—		—		51	1
FCSB	2019–20	Liga I	22	3	1	0	7 (Note: Appearances in UEFA Europa League)	1	—		30	4
FCSB	2020–21	Liga I	25	0	1	0	0	0	1 (Note: Appearance in Supercupa României)	0	27	0
FCSB	2021–22	Liga I	29	2	1	1	1 (Note: Appearance(s) in UEFA Europa Conference League)	0	—		31	3
FCSB	2022–23	Liga I	22	0	1	0	11	0	—		34	0
FCSB	Total		98	5	4	1	19	1	1	0	122	7
Rapid București	2023–24	Liga I	36	1	2	0	—		—		38	1
Rapid București	2024–25	Liga I	6	0	0	0	—		—		6	0
Rapid București	Total		42	1	2	0	—		—		44	1
Universitatea Cluj	2024–25	Liga I	7	0	—		—		—		7	0
UTA Arad	2026–27	Liga I	2	0	0	0	—		—		2	0
Career total			195	7	11	1	19	1	1	0	226	9

== Honours ==
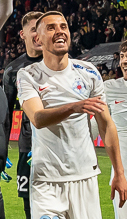
Oaidă celebrating a victory with FCSB in 2022.

FCSB

- Cupa României: 2019–20
- Supercupa României runner-up: 2020
