= Francisc Cristea =

Romanian professional footballer

Personal information
- Full name: Francisc Ionuț Cristea
- Date of birth: 15 January 2001 (age 25)
- Place of birth: Vaslui, Romania
- Height: 1.75 m (5 ft 9 in)
- Position: Midfielder

Team information
- Current team: Gloria Bistrița
- Number: 88

Youth career
- –2018: Sporting Vaslui
- 2018–2019: Politehnica Iași

Senior career*
| Years | Team | Apps | (Gls) |
| 2019–2023 | Politehnica Iași | 76 | (4) |
| 2023–2024 | CSM Reșița | 15 | (0) |
| 2024–2026 | Gloria Bistrița | 8 | (0) |

International career
| 2019 | Romania U19 | 2 | (0) |
| 2021 | Romania U20 | 4 | (0) |
- * Club domestic league appearances and goals as of 8 November 2025

Francisc Ionuț Cristea (born 15 January 2001) is a Romanian professional footballer who plays as a midfielder.

== Club career ==
=== Politehnica Iași ===
In 2019, Cristea moved to Liga I club Politehnica Iași. On 22 April, he made his league debut in a 1–1 draw against Concordia Chiajna. On 19 May 2021 Cristea scored his first professional goal as Politehnica lost 2–4 against Gaz Metan Mediaș and were subsequently relegated to the Romanian Liga II.

== Career statistics ==
As of match played 8 November 2025

Appearances and goals by club, season and competition
| Club | Season | League | | | Cupa României | | Europe | | Other | | Total | |
| Club | Season | Division | Apps | Goals | Apps | Goals | Apps | Goals | Apps | Goals | Apps | Goals |
|---|---|---|---|---|---|---|---|---|---|---|---|---|
| Politehnica Iași | 2018–19 | Liga I | 3 | 0 | 0 | 0 | — | | — | | 3 | 0 |
| Politehnica Iași | 2019–20 | Liga I | 11 | 0 | 2 | 0 | — | | — | | 13 | 0 |
| Politehnica Iași | 2020–21 | Liga I | 17 | 1 | 1 | 0 | — | | — | | 18 | 1 |
| Politehnica Iași | 2021–22 | Liga II | 24 | 3 | 1 | 0 | — | | — | | 25 | 3 |
| Politehnica Iași | 2022–23 | Liga II | 21 | 0 | 2 | 0 | — | | — | | 23 | 0 |
| Politehnica Iași | Total | | 76 | 4 | 6 | 0 | — | | — | | 82 | 4 |
| CSM Reșița | 2023–24 | Liga II | 15 | 0 | 0 | 0 | — | | — | | 15 | 0 |
| Gloria Bistrița | 2024–25 | Liga III | ? | ? | ? | ? | — | | — | | ? | ? |
| Gloria Bistrița | 2025–26 | Liga II | 8 | 0 | 1 | 0 | — | | — | | 9 | 0 |
| Gloria Bistrița | Total | | 8 | 0 | 1 | 0 | — | | — | | 9 | 0 |
| Career total | | | 99 | 4 | 7 | 0 | — | | — | | 106 | 4 |

== Honours ==
Politehnica Iași

- Liga II: 2022–23

Gloria Bistrița

- Liga III: 2024–25
