= Radu Negru (footballer) =

Romanian professional footballer

Personal information
- Full name: Radu Alexandru Negru
- Date of birth: 17 April 1999 (age 27)
- Place of birth: Craiova, Romania
- Height: 1.70 m (5 ft 7 in)
- Position: Right back

Youth career
- Universitatea Craiova

Senior career*
Years	Team	Apps	(Gls)
2017–2018	FC Podari		
2018–2025	FC U Craiova	176	(3)
2025–2026	Unirea Slobozia	6	(0)
2026	Bylis	9	(0)
- * Club domestic league appearances and goals as of 8 March 2026

Radu Alexandru Negru (born 17 April 1999) is a Romanian professional footballer who plays as a defender.

== Honours ==
FC U Craiova

- Liga II: 2020–21
- Liga III: 2019–20
