= Raul Șteau =

Romanian footballer

Personal information
- Full name: Raul Ovidiu Șteau
- Date of birth: 22 April 2001 (age 25)
- Place of birth: Aiud, Romania
- Height: 1.73 m (5 ft 8 in)
- Position: Defensive midfielder

Team information
- Current team: Minaur Baia Mare
- Number: 8

Youth career
- Viitorul Abrud
- –2019: Viitorul Cluj
- 2019–2021: Sassuolo

Senior career*
Years	Team	Apps	(Gls)
2020–2021	Sassuolo	0	(0)
2021	→ Monopoli (loan)	0	(0)
2021–2022	Gaz Metan Mediaș	22	(2)
2022–2023	UTA Arad	21	(0)
2024	Gloria Buzău	10	(0)
2024–2026	CSM Reșița	24	(1)
2026–	Minaur Baia Mare	0	(0)

International career
2017–2018	Romania U17	4	(0)
- * Club domestic league appearances and goals as of 9 May 2026

Raul Ovidiu Șteau (born 22 April 2001) is a Romanian professional footballer who plays as a defensive midfielder for Liga III club Minaur Baia Mare.

== Club career ==
=== Gaz Metan Mediaș ===
He made his Liga I debut for Gaz Metan Mediaș against Voluntari on 12 September 2021.
