= Ianis Stoica =

Romanian footballer (born 2002)

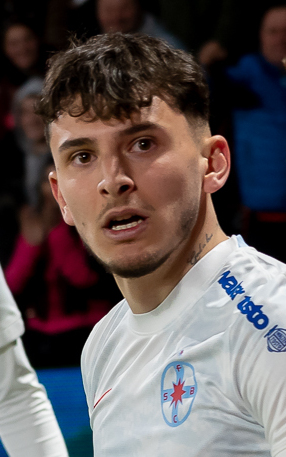
- Stoica with FCSB in 2022

Personal information
- Full name: Ianis Ilie Stoica
- Date of birth: 8 December 2002 (age 23)
- Place of birth: Bucharest, Romania
- Height: 1.80 m (5 ft 11 in)
- Positions: Forward; winger

Team information
- Current team: Estrela Amadora
- Number: 10

Youth career
- 2009–2016: Petrolul Ploiești
- 2016: SC Freiburg
- 2017–2018: FCSB

Senior career*
Years	Team	Apps	(Gls)
2017–2024	FCSB	38	(7)
2019	→ Dunărea Călărași (loan)	2	(0)
2019–2020	→ Petrolul Ploiești (loan)	8	(0)
2020	→ Metaloglobus București (loan)	2	(0)
2020–2021	→ CSM Slatina (loan)	24	(7)
2023–2024	→ Universitatea Cluj (loan)	30	(5)
2024–2025	Hermannstadt	55	(19)
2025–	Estrela Amadora	44	(7)

International career^{‡}
2018	Romania U16	5	(4)
2018–2019	Romania U17	9	(3)
2019–2020	Romania U18	6	(5)
2020–2021	Romania U19	1	(0)
2022–2023	Romania U20	6	(2)
2021–2025	Romania U21	19	(3)
2026–	Romania	1	(0)
- * Club domestic league appearances and goals as of 8 November 2026 ‡ National team caps and goals as of 14 November 2026

Ianis Ilie Stoica (Romanian pronunciation: [ˈjanis iˈli.e ˈstojka]; born 8 December 2002) is a Romanian professional footballer who plays as a forward or winger for Primeira Liga club Estrela Amadora and the Romania national team.

After progressing through the youth systems of Petrolul Ploiești and SC Freiburg, Stoica made his senior debut for FCSB in 2017, aged 14. He spent the next seasons on loan at various Liga I and Liga II clubs, before joining Hermannstadt in 2024. The following year, he moved abroad for the first time by signing with Portuguese team Estrela Amadora.

Internationally, Stoica played for Romania from under-16 up to under-21 level, and represented the latter side at the 2025 UEFA European Championship.

== Club career ==
=== Early career ===
Stoica started his career in 2009 in the academy of Petrolul Ploiești, the same year his father Pompiliu signed a professional contract with the club. He left Petrolul in 2016 when it folded, and then had a six-month spell with SC Freiburg in Germany before returning to his country with FCSB, also a former club of his father.

=== FCSB ===
Stoica made his senior debut for FCSB on 25 October 2017, aged 14, in a 6–1 away rout of Sănătatea Cluj in the Cupa României. He became the youngest player to feature in a competitive match for the club, and also scored his first goal in the process.

==== 2019–2021: Various loans ====
In the winter transfer window of 2019, Stoica agreed to a loan with Dunărea Călărași for the remainder of the season, and on 17 February made his Liga I debut in a goalless draw with Voluntari.

Stoica spent the following campaigns on loan in the second tier with his former youth team Petrolul Ploiești, Metaloglobus București, and CSM Slatina, respectively. He had his most fruitful stint with the latter, scoring seven times from 24 games in spite of the club's relegation at the end of the 2020–21 season.

==== 2021–2023: Return to FCSB ====
On 1 August 2021, Stoica came off the bench for FCSB to equalise late in a 1–1 league draw at UTA Arad. On the 29th that month, he scored the only goal of the Roș-albaștrii in a 1–4 away loss to four-time defending champions CFR Cluj. Following his first team breakthrough, owner George Becali announced that he rejected a €7.5 million bid for Stoica from Premier League club Arsenal, although the veridicity of his claims was questioned.

On 15 December 2021, Stoica came off the bench at half-time, obtained a penalty in extra time and netted a goal for himself in a 3–1 derby defeat of Rapid București. On 30 January 2022, he scored again in another Bucharest derby by coming off the bench in a 3–0 win over Dinamo București.

==== 2023–2024: Loan to Universitatea Cluj ====
After failing to score any goals during the first half of the 2022–23 season, Stoica was sent out on a six-month loan to Universitatea Cluj on 17 December 2022. His loan was extended for another year, but he left the club prematurely on 2 February 2024, after receiving an offer from Israeli team Hapoel Be'er Sheva and refusing to train.

=== Hermannstadt ===
On 7 February 2024, after his move to Hapoel Be'er Sheva fell through, Stoica joined fellow Liga I club Hermannstadt for a €500,000 transfer fee, payable within one year. He signed a three-and-a-half-year contract and was assigned the number 7 shirt.

Stoica made his debut on 11 February 2024, in a goalless league draw with his former team Petrolul Ploiești, and totalled five goals from 15 Liga I appearances by the end of the season. On 14 February 2025, he delivered a standout performance by scoring his first professional hat-trick within 21 minutes after coming on at half-time, leading Hermannstadt to a 3–2 away win over Sepsi OSK.

Over the course of the 2024–25 campaign, he made 44 appearances across all competitions, scoring 15 goals and providing five assists. He also played a role in his team's run to the final of the Cupa României, where they finished as runners-up after a 2–3 loss to CFR Cluj.

=== Estrela da Amadora ===
On 28 July 2025, Stoica completed a €1.3 million transfer to Portuguese side Estrela da Amadora, signing a three-year contract and being handed the number 10 jersey. Hermannstadt also retained 20% interest on a possible future sale.

Stoica made his competitive debut on 11 August 2025, scoring just one minute after coming on as a substitute to secure a 1–1 draw against Estoril in the opening match of the Primeira Liga season.

== International career ==
=== Youth ===
Stoica is a Romania youth international, and has represented the country from under-16 up to under-21 level. On 15 August 2019, he scored on debut for the under-18s in a 4–1 victory over Albania. He repeated the performance at the under-21 side on 7 September 2021, netting in a 1–1 friendly draw with Georgia.

On 15 October 2024, Stoica scored a double for Romania under-21 in a 3–1 home win over Switzerland counting for the 2025 UEFA European Championship qualifiers. The result secured his nation the first place in their group, qualifying for their fourth consecutive European Under-21 Championship.

=== Senior ===
In November 2026, Stoica received his first senior call-up to the Romania national team when manager Gheorghe Hagi included him in the squad for the 2026–27 Nations League fixtures against Poland and Bosnia and Herzegovina.

== Style of play ==
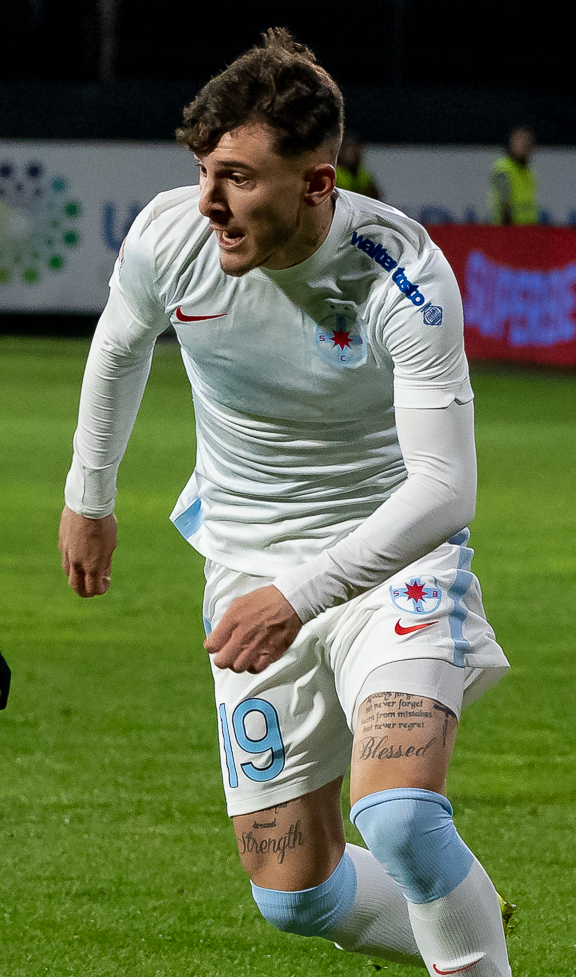
Stoica in action for FCSB in a match against CFR Cluj, April 2022.

Stoica is a versatile attacker, being able to play on the wing or as a lone striker, but can also be deployed in a less advanced position in the midfield. Michael Yokhin of Goal noted that he "is quick, loves to dribble and improvise, and feels comfortable on both flanks", although "he would arguably be more dangerous on the left" since he is right-footed.

== Personal life ==
Stoica's father, Pompiliu, was also a professional footballer. A left-back, he too played for FCSB—then named Steaua București—and Petrolul Ploiești.

== Career statistics ==
As of match played 8 November 2026

Appearances and goals by club, season and competition
Club	Season	League			National cup (Note: Includes Cupa României, Taça de Portugal)		Continental		Other		Total	
Club	Season	Division	Apps	Goals	Apps	Goals	Apps	Goals	Apps	Goals	Apps	Goals
FCSB	2017–18	Liga I	0	0	3	1	—		—		3	1
FCSB	2018–19	Liga I	0	0	1	0	—		—		1	0
FCSB	2021–22	Liga I	32	7	1	2	1 (Note: Appearances in UEFA Europa Conference League)	0	—		34	9
FCSB	2022–23	Liga I	6	0	2	0	11	0	—		19	0
FCSB	Total		38	7	7	3	12	0	—		57	10
Dunărea Călărași (loan)	2018–19	Liga I	2	0	1	0	—		—		3	0
Petrolul Ploiești (loan)	2019–20	Liga II	8	0	0	0	—		—		8	0
Metaloglobus București (loan)	2019–20	Liga II	2	0	—		—		—		2	0
CSM Slatina (loan)	2020–21	Liga II	24	7	0	0	—		—		24	7
Universitatea Cluj (loan)	2022–23	Liga I	10	0	0	0	—		—		10	0
Universitatea Cluj (loan)	2023–24	Liga I	20	5	3	4	—		—		23	9
Universitatea Cluj (loan)	Total		30	5	3	4	—		—		33	9
Hermannstadt	2023–24	Liga I	15	5	1	0	—		—		16	5
Hermannstadt	2024–25	Liga I	38	13	7	2	—		—		45	15
Hermannstadt	2025–26	Liga I	2	1	—		—		—		2	1
Hermannstadt	Total		55	19	8	2	—		—		63	21
Estrela Amadora	2025–26	Primeira Liga	33	3	1	0	—		0	0	34	3
Estrela Amadora	2026–27	Primeira Liga	11	4	0	0	—		—		11	4
Estrela Amadora	Total		44	7	1	0	—		—		45	7
Career total			203	45	20	9	12	0	0	0	235	54

== Honours ==
Universitatea Cluj

- Cupa României runner-up: 2022–23

Hermannstadt

- Cupa României runner-up: 2024–25
