= Andrei Dumiter =

Romanian footballer

Personal information
- Full name: Ioan Andrei Vasile Dumiter
- Date of birth: 10 April 1999 (age 27)
- Place of birth: Timișoara, Romania
- Height: 1.84 m (6 ft 0 in)
- Position: Forward

Team information
- Current team: Botoșani
- Number: 41

Youth career
- –2016: LPS Banatul Timișoara

Senior career*
Years	Team	Apps	(Gls)
2016	NMM Becicherecu Mic		
2017–2019	Ripensia Timișoara	68	(21)
2019–2021	Sepsi OSK	15	(1)
2019	→ Chindia Târgoviște (loan)	12	(1)
2021–2023	FCSB	22	(3)
2023–2024	Voluntari	48	(8)
2024–2025	UTA Arad	5	(0)
2025	→ Voluntari (loan)	11	(0)
2025–	Botoșani	47	(12)

International career
2016	Romania U18	3	(0)
- * Club domestic league appearances and goals as of 1 November 2026

Ioan Andrei Vasile Dumiter (born 10 April 1999) is a Romanian professional footballer who plays as forward for Liga I club Botoșani.

== Career statistics ==
As of match played 1 November 2026

Appearances and goals by club, season and competition
Club	Season	League			Cupa României		Europe		Other		Total	
Club	Season	Division	Apps	Goals	Apps	Goals	Apps	Goals	Apps	Goals	Apps	Goals
NMM Becicherecu Mic	2016–17	Liga III	?	?	1	0	—		—		1	0
Ripensia Timișoara	2017–18	Liga II	34	11	0	0	—		—		34	11
Ripensia Timișoara	2018–19	Liga II	34	10	0	0	—		—		34	10
Ripensia Timișoara	Total		68	21	0	0	—		—		68	21
Sepsi OSK	2019–20	Liga I	5	0	1	1	—		—		6	1
Sepsi OSK	2020–21	Liga I	9	1	0	0	—		—		9	1
Sepsi OSK	2021–22	Liga I	1	0	—		0	0	—		1	0
Sepsi OSK	Total		15	1	1	1	0	0	—		16	2
Chindia Târgoviște (loan)	2019–20	Liga I	12	1	1	0	—		—		13	1
FCSB	2021–22	Liga I	21	3	1	0	0	0	—		22	3
FCSB	2022–23	Liga I	1	0	2	0	2 (Note: Appearances in UEFA Europa Conference League)	0	—		5	0
FCSB	Total		22	3	3	0	2	0	—		27	3
Voluntari	2022–23	Liga I	15	1	—		—		1 (Note: Appearances in Liga I European play-offs)	1	16	2
Voluntari	2023–24	Liga I	33	7	3	1	—		—		36	8
Voluntari	Total		48	8	3	1	—		1	1	52	10
UTA Arad	2024–25	Liga I	5	0	1	0	—		—		6	0
Voluntari (loan)	2024–25	Liga II	11	0	—		—		1 (Note: Appearance in Liga I promotion/relegation play-offs)	0	12	0
Botoșani	2025–26	Liga I	33	5	2	1	—		1	0	36	6
Botoșani	2026–27	Liga I	14	7	3	0	—		—		17	7
Botoșani	Total		47	12	5	1	—		1	0	53	13
Career total			228	46	15	3	2	0	3	1	248	50

== Honours ==
Sepsi OSK

- Cupa României runner-up: 2019–20
