= Thierry Moutinho =

Portuguese footballer (born 1991)

Personal information
- Full name: Thierry Rua Moutinho
- Date of birth: 26 February 1991 (age 35)
- Place of birth: Geneva, Switzerland
- Height: 1.78 m (5 ft 10 in)
- Position: Midfielder

Team information
- Current team: AEL
- Number: 30

Youth career
- 2007–2008: Étoile Carouge
- 2009–2010: Servette

Senior career*
Years	Team	Apps	(Gls)
2008–2009	Étoile Carouge	24	(1)
2010–2013	Servette	35	(1)
2011–2012	→ Badajoz (loan)	19	(5)
2014–2015	Albacete	30	(4)
2015–2017	Mallorca	52	(5)
2016	→ Tenerife (loan)	16	(1)
2017–2019	CFR Cluj	25	(1)
2018	→ Cultural Leonesa (loan)	15	(1)
2019–2020	FCSB	7	(0)
2020–2021	Córdoba	26	(0)
2021–2023	Levadiakos	44	(6)
2023–2024	Athens Kallithea	24	(4)
2025–	AEL	10	(2)

International career
2011	Portugal U20	2	(0)
- * Club domestic league appearances and goals as of 17:00, 12 April 2025 (UTC)

Thierry Rua Moutinho (born 26 February 1991) is a professional footballer who plays as a midfielder for Super League Greece club AEL.

He spent most of his career in Spain, making 99 Segunda División appearances and scoring nine goals for four clubs, mainly Mallorca. He also had spells in the top divisions of Switzerland, Romania and Greece.

Born in Switzerland, Moutinho was a youth international for Portugal.

== Club career ==
=== Servette ===
Born in Geneva, Switzerland to Portuguese parents, Moutinho started playing football with Étoile Carouge FC. In 2009 he signed with Servette FC, completing his training with the club and making his first senior appearances in the Swiss Challenge League.

In 2010–11, Moutinho played five league games (one start) as Servette won promotion to the Super League. For the following season he was loaned to CD Badajoz in Spain but, after the sale of Matías Vitkieviez to BSC Young Boys in January 2012, he was recalled and assigned the #7 squad number, going on to feature in several matches towards the end of the campaign as the team from the Stade de Genève finished in fourth place.

=== Spain ===
Other than his spell with Badajoz, Moutinho spent several years competing in Spanish football, helping Albacete Balompié promote to Segunda División in 2014. He made his professional league debut in that country with that team, coming on as a second-half substitute in a 0–1 home loss against CD Numancia on 21 September 2014.

On 7 July 2015, Moutinho signed with RCD Mallorca on a two-year contract. He scored four goals in his second season, but the Balearic Islands club returned to Segunda División B after 36 years; during his spell, he was also loaned to CD Tenerife of the same league for five months.

=== Later career ===
Moutinho started the 2017–18 campaign in the Romanian Liga I, with CFR Cluj. On 27 December 2017, however, he returned to Spain and joined Cultural y Deportiva Leonesa on loan.

On 15 July 2019, Moutinho returned to the Romanian top flight and signed a contract with FCSB. The following transfer window, after 13 competitive appearances, the free agent returned to the Spanish third tier after agreeing to a six-month deal at Córdoba CF.

Moutinho moved to Levadiakos F.C. of Super League Greece 2 in August 2021. He won promotion as champions in his first season.

In August 2023, Moutinho returned to the Greek second division, with Athens Kallithea FC.

== International career ==
Moutinho was part of the Portugal under-20 squad at the 2011 Toulon Tournament. He earned the first of his two caps for his country on 3 June, starting in a 1–1 group stage draw with Italy.

== Career statistics ==
As of match played 8 March 2020

Appearances and goals by club, season and competition
Club	Season	League		Cup		Europe		Other		Total	
Club	Season	Apps	Goals	Apps	Goals	Apps	Goals	Apps	Goals	Apps	Goals
Étoile Carouge	2007–08	8	0	2	0	—				10	0
Étoile Carouge	2008–09	16	1	0	0	—				16	1
Étoile Carouge	Total	24	1	2	0	—	—	—	—	26	1
Servette	2009–10	3	0	0	0	—				3	0
Servette	2010–11	5	0	1	0	—		0	0	6	0
Servette	2011–12	13	1	0	0	—				13	1
Servette	2012–13	9	0	0	0	3	0	—		12	0
Servette	2013–14	5	0	1	0	—				6	0
Servette	Total	35	1	2	0	3	0	0	0	40	1
Badajoz (loan)	2011–12	19	5	0	0	—				19	5
Albacete	2013–14	14	2	0	0	—		1	0	15	2
Albacete	2014–15	16	2	4	1	—				20	3
Albacete	Total	30	4	4	1	—	—	1	0	35	5
Mallorca	2015–16	18	1	1	0	—				19	1
Mallorca	2016–17	34	4	2	0	—				36	4
Mallorca	Total	52	5	3	0	—	—	—	—	55	5
Tenerife (loan)	2015–16	15	1	—		—				15	1
CFR Cluj	2017–18	9	0	1	0	—				10	0
CFR Cluj	2018–19	16	1	4	0	0	0	0	0	20	1
CFR Cluj	Total	25	1	5	0	0	0	0	0	30	1
Cultural Leonesa (loan)	2017–18	15	1	0	0	—				15	1
FCSB	2019–20	7	0	2	0	4	0	–		13	0
Córdoba	2019–20	6	0	0	0	–		–		6	0
Career total		228	19	18	1	7	0	1	0	254	20

== Honours ==
CFR Cluj

- Liga I: 2017–18, 2018–19
- Supercupa României: 2018

FCSB

- Cupa României: 2019–20

Levadiakos

- Super League Greece 2: 2021–22

AEL

- Super League Greece 2: 2024–25
