= Robert Ion =

Romanian footballer (born 2000)

Personal information
- Full name: Robert Andrei Ion
- Date of birth: 5 September 2000 (age 26)
- Place of birth: Bucharest, Romania
- Height: 1.80 m (5 ft 11 in)
- Position: Attacking midfielder

Team information
- Current team: Concordia Chiajna
- Number: 10

Youth career
- –2017: Regal Sport București
- 2017–2018: FCSB

Senior career*
Years	Team	Apps	(Gls)
2018–2022	FCSB	2	(0)
2018–2019	→ Academica Clinceni (loan)	32	(10)
2019–2020	→ Academica Clinceni (loan)	31	(2)
2021	→ Voluntari (loan)	3	(0)
2021–2022	→ Academica Clinceni (loan)	27	(3)
2022	Farul Constanța	3	(0)
2022–2024	Politehnica Iași	29	(4)
2024–2025	Concordia Chiajna	26	(5)
2025–2026	Olympic Charleroi	23	(1)
2026–	Concordia Chiajna	10	(1)

International career
2018	Romania U19	2	(0)
- * Club domestic league appearances and goals as of 7 November 2026

Robert Andrei Ion (born 5 September 2000) is a Romanian professional footballer who plays as an attacking midfielder for Liga II club Concordia Chiajna.

== Club career ==
=== Farul Constanța ===
In the summer of 2022, Farul Constanța announced the signing of Ion on a three-year contract. On 7 December 2022, just after three matches played in Liga I, Ion was released from the club after having his contract mutually terminated.

=== Politehnica Iași ===
On 28 December 2022, Politehnica Iași announced the singing of Ion.

== Career statistics ==
As of match played 7 November 2026

Appearances and goals by club, season and competition
Club	Season	League			National cup (Note: Includes Cupa României, Belgian Cup)		Europe		Other		Total	
Club	Season	Division	Apps	Goals	Apps	Goals	Apps	Goals	Apps	Goals	Apps	Goals
Academica Clinceni (loan)	2018–19	Liga II	32	10	0	0	—		—		32	10
Academica Clinceni (loan)	2019–20	Liga I	31	2	3	1	—		—		34	3
Academica Clinceni (loan)	2021–22	Liga I	27	3	1	0	—		—		28	3
Academica Clinceni (loan)	Total		90	15	4	1	—		—		94	16
FCSB	2019–20	Liga I	0	0	0	0	1 (Note: Appearance(s) in UEFA Europa League)	0	—		1	0
FCSB	2020–21	Liga I	2	0	0	0	2	0	0	0	4	0
FCSB	Total		2	0	0	0	3	0	0	0	5	0
Voluntari (loan)	2021–22	Liga I	3	0	0	0	—		—		3	0
Farul Constanța	2022–23	Liga I	3	0	2	0	—		—		5	0
Politehnica Iași	2022–23	Liga II	13	3	—		—		—		13	3
Politehnica Iași	2023–24	Liga I	16	1	1	0	—		—		17	1
Politehnica Iași	Total		29	4	1	0	—		—		30	4
Concordia Chiajna	2024–25	Liga II	26	5	2	0	—		—		28	5
Olympic Charleroi	2025–26	Challenger Pro League	23	1	2	1	—		—		25	2
Concordia Chiajna	2026–27	Liga II	10	1	4	2	—		—		15	3
Career total			186	26	15	4	3	0	0	0	204	30

== Honours ==
Farul Constanța

- Liga I: 2022–23

Politehnica Iași

- Liga II: 2022–23
