= Marian Botezatu =

Romanian international footballer

Personal information
- Full name: Marian Cristian Botezatu
- Date of birth: 26 December 2000 (age 25)
- Place of birth: Piatra Neamț, Romania
- Height: 1.83 m (6 ft 0 in)
- Position: Defender

Youth career
- FCSB

Senior career*
Years	Team	Apps	(Gls)
2018–2023	FCSB	1	(0)
2021	→ Foresta Suceava (loan)	11	(0)
2022–2023	→ Foresta Suceava (loan)	21	(2)
2023–2024	Aerostar Bacău	1	(0)
Total		34	(2)
- * Club domestic league appearances and goals as of 08:34, 7 December 2024 (UTC)

Marian Cristian Botezatu (born 26 December 2000) is a former Romanian footballer who played as a defender.

== Career ==
A product of the FCSB youth academy, Botezatu made his first team debut for the club on 27 September 2018 against Unirea Alba Iulia in the Cupa României. On 11 August 2019, Botezatu made his Liga I debut for FCSB, scoring an own goal in 3–1 loss against Voluntari.

== Career statistics ==
=== Club ===
Statistics accurate as of match played 11 August 2019.

Club	Season	League		Cup		Europe		Other		Total	
Club	Season	Apps	Goals	Apps	Goals	Apps	Goals	Apps	Goals	Apps	Goals
FCSB	2018–19	0	0	1	0	0	0	–		1	0
FCSB	2019–20	1	0	0	0	0	0	–		1	0
FCSB	Total	1	0	1	0	0	0	–	–	2	0
Career total		1	0	1	0	0	0	–	–	2	0
