= Sorin Șerban =

Romanian footballer

Personal information
- Full name: Sorin Dănuț Șerban
- Date of birth: 17 April 2000 (age 26)
- Place of birth: Baia Mare, Romania
- Height: 1.79 m (5 ft 10 in)
- Position: Left back

Team information
- Current team: Bihor Oradea
- Number: 71

Youth career
- 2009–2011: FC "Viorel Mateianu" Baia Mare
- 2011–2012: CS Mara Baia Mare
- 2012–2014: Sporting Recea
- 2014–2016: CSȘ 2 Baia Mare
- 2016–2017: Viitorul Ulmeni
- 2017–2018: Unirea Dej

Senior career*
Years	Team	Apps	(Gls)
2018–2019	Minaur Baia Mare	15	(0)
2019–2023	FCSB	14	(0)
2019–2020	→ Politehnica Iași (loan)	13	(0)
2023	Politehnica Iași	3	(0)
2024	ACS Mediaș		
2024–2026	1599 Șelimbăr	34	(2)
2026–	Bihor Oradea	11	(0)

International career
2017–2018	Romania U18	4	(0)
2018–2019	Romania U19	8	(0)
2021	Romania U21	1	(0)
- * Club domestic league appearances and goals as of 1 August 2026

Sorin Dănuț Șerban (born 17 April 2000) is a Romanian professional footballer who plays as a left back for Liga II club Bihor Oradea.

== Club career ==
Șerban began his career at local club Viorel Mateianu, before moving to CS Mara Baia Mare in 2007. In 2012, he moved to Sporting Racea, before playing for CSS2 Baia Mare. In 2016, Șerban moved to Viitorul Ulmeni, playing for the club for two years, before signing for Unirea Dej.

Later in 2018, Șerban signed for Liga III club Minaur Baia Mare.

=== FCSB ===
On 31 July 2019, Șerban joined Liga I side FCSB. On 11 August 2019, he made his Liga I debut for FCSB in a 3–1 loss against Voluntari.

=== Politehnica Iași (loan) ===
After making only one appearance for FCSB, Șerban was loaned to fellow Liga I club Politehnica Iași, for the 2019–20 season.

== International career ==
Șerban has represented Romania at youth level, making appearances for the under-18 and under-19 teams.
