= Ovidiu Sterian =

Romanian professional footballer

Personal information
- Full name: Ovidiu George Sterian
- Date of birth: 8 March 2004 (age 22)
- Place of birth: Codlea, Romania
- Height: 1.80 m (5 ft 11 in)
- Position: Centre back

Team information
- Current team: TSV Bernhausen
- Number: 88

Youth career
- 2010–2013: ACSM Codlea
- 2013–2015: Bența Brașov
- 2015–2017: Colțea Brașov
- 2018–2021: Kids Tâmpa Brașov

Senior career*
Years	Team	Apps	(Gls)
2021–2022	Academica II Clinceni	1	(0)
2022	Academica Clinceni	6	(0)
2022–2024	SR Brașov	44	(0)
2024–	TSV Bernhausen	15	(0)
- * Club domestic league appearances and goals as of 18:29, 27 December 2024 (UTC)

Ovidiu George Sterian (born 8 March 2004) is a Romanian professional footballer who plays as a centre back for German lower leagues club TSV Bernhausen.
