= Styria (disambiguation) =

Styria is a federal state of Austria.

Styria may also refer to:

- Upper Styria, which can refer either to the entire state of Styria or to the northern part of it
- Styria (Slovenia), an informal province in Slovenia
- Duchy of Styria, a former state of the Holy Roman Empire and one-time crown land of Austria-Hungary
- Styria (company), a Styrian media and printing enterprise

== See also ==
- History of Styria
- Stiria, a genus of moths
- Syria
