= 2020 Cupa României final =

- Event: 2019–20 Cupa României
Sepsi Sfântu Gheorghe	FCSB
0	1
- Date: 22 July 2020
- Venue: Ilie Oană, Ploiești
- Man of the Match: Dennis Man
- Referee: Sebastian Colțescu
- Attendance: 0 (Note: The match was played behind closed doors due to the COVID-19 pandemic in Romania.)
- Weather: Cloudy

The 2020 Cupa României final is the final match of the 2019–20 Cupa României and the 82nd final of the Cupa României, Romania's premier football cup competition. It was played on 22 July 2020 between Sepsi Sfântu Gheorghe and FCSB.

Sepsi reached their first cup final in the club's existence. The club from Sfântu Gheorghe was founded in 2011, this being the biggest achievement in their 9 years of club history. On the other hand, FCSB were playing their 32nd Cupa României final, having won the trophy 22 times.

The winner qualified for the 2020–21 UEFA Europa League. They also earned the right to play against 2019–20 Liga I champions for the 2020 Supercupa României.

FCSB won the game thanks to a goal scored by Dennis Man in the 65th minute.

The game was hosted by the Ilie Oană Stadium in Ploiești. Due to the COVID-19 pandemic, the game was played behind closed doors.

== Route to the final ==
Sepsi Sf. Gheorghe		Round	FCSB
Opponent	Results		Opponent	Results
Ripensia Timișoara	4–1 (A)	Last 32	Metaloglobus București	2–0 (A)
Astra Giurgiu	4–2 (H)	Last 16	Universitatea Cluj	1-0 (A)
Petrolul Ploiești	1–0 (A)	Quarter-finals	Hermannstadt	2–1 (A)
Politehnica Iași	5–1 (H) and 3-0 (A)	Semi-finals	Dinamo București	3–0 (A) and 1–0 (H)

== Match ==
22 July 2020
20:00 EEST (UTC+3)

Sepsi Sfântu Gheorghe (1)	0–1	FCSB (1)
		Dennis Man 65'

Ilie Oană, Ploiești
Attendance: 0
Referee: Sebastian Colțescu

Sepsi	FCSB

GK	33	(Romania) Roland Niczuly
RB	19	(Bulgaria) Radoslav Dimitrov	(substituted off) 75'
CB	29	(Algeria) Rachid Bouhenna (c)		(yellow card) 77' (yellow-red card) 80'
CB	4	(Romania) Răzvan Tincu
LB	96	(Romania) Florin Ștefan
MF	8	(Romania) Gabriel Vașvari
MF	13	(Romania) Ronaldo Deaconu
MF	23	(Netherlands) Anass Achahbar	(substituted off) 83'
RW	27	(Romania) Nicolae Carnat	(substituted off) 46'
FW	25	(Switzerland) Goran Karanović	(substituted off) 46'
LW	11	(Romania) Marius Ștefănescu	(substituted off) 75'
Substitutes:
GK	95	(Romania) Béla Fejér
MF	5	(Romania) Lóránt Kovács
DF	6	(Romania) Daniel Celea	(substituted in) 83'
MF	7	(Romania) George Dragomir
MF	10	(Romania) Lóránd Fülöp	(substituted in) 46'
FW	14	(Argentina) Tomás Díaz	(substituted in) 75'
FW	18	(Slovakia) Pavol Šafranko	(substituted in) 46'
MF	21	(Slovakia) Peter Gál-Andrezly
MF	99	(Romania) Balázs Csiszér	(substituted in) 75'
Manager:
(Romania) Leontin Grozavu

GK	99	(Romania) Andrei Vlad
RB	2	(Romania) Valentin Crețu
CB	4	(Romania) Andrei Miron
CB	17	(Romania) Iulian Cristea
LB	3	(Romania) Ionuț Panțîru	(substituted off) 89'
CM	20	(Romania) Ionuț Vînă	(substituted off) 46'
CM	27	(Romania) Darius Olaru	(substituted off) 46'
CM	23	(Romania) Ovidiu Popescu
RW	98	(Romania) Dennis Man 65'
LW	7	(Romania) Florinel Coman	(substituted off) 93'
FW	10	(Romania) Florin Tănase (c)	(yellow card) 58'
Substitutes:
GK	33	(Romania) Mihai Udrea
FW	92	(Romania) Romeo Niță
FW	31	(Romania) Andrei Istrate
MF	29	(Romania) Andrei Pandele
DF	28	(Romania) Alexandru Pantea	(substituted in) 89'
MF	25	(Romania) Ovidiu Perianu	(substituted in) 93'
FW	19	(Romania) Adrian Petre	(substituted in) 46'
FW	22	(Romania) Cristian Dumitru
MF	11	(Romania) Olimpiu Moruțan	(substituted in) 46'
Manager:
(Romania) Anton Petrea

MAN OF THE MATCH

- (Romania) Dennis Man

MATCH OFFICIALS

- Assistant referees:
  - Ovidiu Artene
  - George Neacșu
- Fourth official:
  - Andrei Chivulete
- Additional assistant referees:

MATCH RULES

- 90 minutes.
- 30 minutes of extra-time if necessary.
- Penalty shoot-out if scores still level.
- Nine named substitutes.
- Maximum of five substitutions.
