= 2020–21 FCSB season =

FCSB
2020–21 season
- President: Valeriu Argăseală
- Manager: Bogdan Vintilă (until 15 July); Anton Petrea (from 15 July)
- Stadium: Arena Națională
- Liga I: 2nd
- Cupa României: Round of 16
- Supercupa României: Runners-up
- Europa League: Third qualifying round
- Top goalscorer: League: Florin Tănase (23); All: Florin Tănase (24)
Home colours	Away colours

The 2020–21 season is FCSB's 73rd season since its founding in 1947.

== Previous season positions ==
	Competition	Position
(European Union)	UEFA Europa League	Play-off round
(Romania)	Liga I	5th
(Romania)	Cupa României	Winners

== Players ==
=== First team squad ===
N	Pos.	Nat.	Name	Age	EU	Since	App	Goals	Ends	Transfer fee	Notes
1	GK	(Romania)	Cătălin Straton	36	EU	2020	3	0	2022	Free	
2	DF	(Romania)	Valentin Crețu	37	EU	2019	44	0	2021	€125k	
3	DF	(Romania)	Ionuț Panțîru	30	EU	2019	40	1	2024	€200k	
4	DF	(Romania)	George Miron	31	EU	2020	21	1	2022	Free	
5	MF	(Romania)	Gabriel Simion	27	EU	2016	6	0	2022	Youth system	
6	DF	(Romania)	Marius Briceag	34	EU	2020	4	0	2021	Free	
7	FW	(Romania)	Florinel Coman (4th captain)	28	EU	2017	115	32	2022	€2.65M	
8	MF	(Romania)	Lucian Filip (vice-captain)	35	EU	2009	180	7	2021	Youth system	
9	FW	(Romania)	Sergiu Buș	33	EU	2020	8	1	2022	Free	
10	FW	(Romania)	Florin Tănase (captain)	31	EU	2016	161	44	2021	€1.5M	
11	MF	(Romania)	Olimpiu Moruțan	27	EU	2018	73	8	2023	€700k	
16	MF	(Romania)	Dragoș Nedelcu	29	EU	2017	70	2	2022	€2.13M	
17	DF	(Romania)	Iulian Cristea	31	EU	2019	55	5	2023	€150k	
18	DF	(Greece)	Aristidis Soiledis	35	EU	2019	22	1	2020	€75k	
20	MF	(Romania)	Ionuț Vînă	31	EU	2019	42	2	2024	€750k	
21	FW	(Romania)	Alexandru Buziuc	32	EU	2020	7	1	2021	€50k	
22	FW	(Romania)	Cristian Dumitru	24	EU	2018	11	3	2021	Youth system	
23	MF	(Romania)	Ovidiu Popescu (3rd captain)	32	EU	2016	129	4	2022	€200k	
24	MF	(Romania)	Robert Ion	25	EU	2018	4	0	2022	Youth system	
25	MF	(Romania)	Ovidiu Perianu	24	EU	2019	14	0	2024	Youth system	
26	MF	(Romania)	Răzvan Oaidă	28	EU	2019	32	4	2024	€700k	
27	MF	(Romania)	Darius Olaru	28	EU	2020	21	4	2024	€600k	
28	DF	(Romania)	Alexandru Pantea	22	EU	2020	9	0	2025	Youth system	
29	MF	(Romania)	Andrei Pandele	22	EU	2020	2	0	Undisclosed	Youth system	
32	GK	(Romania)	Ștefan Târnovanu	25	EU	2020	0	0	2024	€200k	
33	GK	(Romania)	Mihai Udrea	24	EU	2020	1	0	2024	Youth system	
40	DF	(Romania)	Ștefan Cană	25	EU	2018	2	0	2021	Youth system	
44	DF	(Romania)	Gabriel Enache	35	EU	2020	81	5	2021	Free	
77	DF	(Romania)	Alexandru Stan	37	EU	2018	14	0	2021	€300k	
89	MF	(Romania)	Adrian Șut	27	EU	2019	4	0	2023	Free	
97	GK	(Romania)	Toma Niga	28	EU	2017	0	0	2022	€30k	
98	FW	(Romania)	Dennis Man	27	EU	2016	135	40	2024	€500k	
99	GK	(Romania)	Andrei Vlad	27	EU	2017	50	0	2023	€400k	

- Last updated: 29 October 2020
- Source: FCSB.ro, Players in / out, Wikipedia players' articles

=== Transfers ===
==== In ====
No.	Pos.	Nat.	Name	Age	EU	Moving from	Type	Transfer window	Ends	Transfer fee	Source
—	FW	(Romania)	Ianis Stoica	17	EU	Metaloglobus București	Loan return	Summer	2023	—	
—	DF	(Romania)	Mario Mihai	21	EU	Tunari	Loan return	Summer	2023	—	
5	DF	(Romania)	Gabriel Simion	22	EU	Astra Giurgiu	Loan return	Summer	2022	—	
21	FW	(Romania)	Alexandru Buziuc	26	EU	Academica Clinceni	Transfer	Summer	2021	€50,000	
29	MF	(Romania) (Brazil)	William De Amorim	28	EU	Xanthi (Greece)	Loan return	Summer	2021	—	
9	FW	(Romania) (Romania)	Sergiu Buș	27	EU	Gaz Metan Mediaș	Transfer	Summer	2023	Free	
22	DF	(Romania)	Sorin Șerban	20	EU	Politehnica Iași	Loan return	Summer	2024	—	
70	DF	(Romania)	Claudiu Belu	26	EU	Voluntari	Loan return	Summer	2024	—	
6	DF	(Romania) (Romania)	Marius Briceag	28	EU	Universitatea Craiova	Transfer	Summer	Undisclosed	Free	
89	MF	(Romania)	Adrian Șut	21	EU	Academica Clinceni	Loan return	Summer	2023	—	
24	MF	(Romania)	Robert Ion	19	EU	Academica Clinceni	Loan return	Summer	Undisclosed	—	
30	MF	(Romania)	Ovidiu Horșia	19	EU	Politehnica Iași	Loan return	Summer	Undisclosed	Free	
32	GK	(Romania)	Ștefan Târnovanu	20	EU	Politehnica Iași	Loan return	Summer	2024	Free	
12	GK	(Romania)	Răzvan Ducan	19	EU	Argeș Pitești	Loan return	Summer	Undisclosed	—	
37	MF	(Romania)	Octavian Popescu	17	EU	Youth system	Promoted	Summer	2024	–	
40	DF	(Romania)	Ștefan Cană	20	EU	Farul Constanța	Loan return	Summer	2024	—	
1	GK	(Romania)	Cătălin Straton	30	EU	Dinamo București	Transfer	Summer	2023	Free	
44	DF	(Romania)	Gabriel Enache	30	EU	Kyzylzhar (Kazakhstan)	Transfer	Summer	Undisclosed	Free	
15	MF	(Portugal) (Luxembourg)	David Caiado	33	EU	Hermannstadt	Loan	Summer	2022	—	
22	FW	(Switzerland) (Serbia)	Goran Karanović	32	EU	Hermannstadt	Loan	Summer	2022	—	
22	FW	(Romania)	Cristian Dumitru	18	EU	Academica Clinceni	Loan return	Summer	2024	—	
33	DF	(Montenegro)	Risto Radunović	28	EU	Astra Giurgiu	Transfer	Winter	2025	€400,000	
92	FW	(Romania)	Adrian Niță	17	EU	Turris Turnu Măgurele	Loan return	Winter	—	—	
12	GK	(Romania)	Răzvan Ducan	19	EU	Turris Turnu Măgurele	Loan return	Winter	—	—	
9	FW	(Croatia)	Ante Vukušić	29	EU	Olimpija Ljubljana (Slovenia)	Transfer	Winter	2021	Free	
6	DF	(Romania)	Denis Haruț	21	EU	Botoșani	Transfer	Winter	2025	€660,000	

==== Out ====
No.	Pos.	Nat.	Name	Age	EU	Moving to	Type	Transfer window	Transfer fee	Source
9	FW	(France) (Ivory Coast)	Harlem Gnohéré	32	EU	Royal Antwerp (Belgium)	Mutual termination	Summer	—	
15	DF	(Serbia)	Marko Momčilović	33	EU	Radnički Niš (Serbia)	End of contract	Summer	Free	
88	FW	(Romania)	Adrian Popa	31	EU	Reading (England)	End of loan	Summer	Free	
34	GK	(Romania)	Cristian Bălgrădean	32	EU	CFR Cluj	Transfer	Summer	Free	
70	DF	(Romania)	Claudiu Belu	26	EU	Hermannstadt	Transfer	Summer	Free	
29	FW	(Brazil) (Romania)	William De Amorim	28	Non-EU	Altay (Turkey)	Transfer	Summer	—	
92	FW	(Romania)	Adrian Niță	17	EU	Turris Turnu Măgurele	Loan	Summer	—	
22	FW	(Romania)	Cristian Dumitru	18	EU	Academica Clinceni	Loan	Summer	—	
19	FW	(Romania)	Ianis Stoica	17	EU	Slatina	Loan	Summer	—	
—	DF	(Romania)	Mario Mihai	21	EU	Tunari	Transfer	Summer	Free	
16	DF	(Serbia)	Bogdan Planić	28	EU	Maccabi Haifa (Israel)	Transfer	Summer	Free	
12	GK	(Romania)	Răzvan Ducan	19	EU	Turris Turnu Măgurele	Loan	Summer	—	
22	FW	(Switzerland) (Serbia)	Goran Karanović	32	EU	Hermannstadt	End of loan	Summer	—	
15	MF	(Portugal) (Luxembourg)	David Caiado	33	EU	Hermannstadt	End of loan	Summer	—	
19	FW	(Romania)	Adrian Petre	22	EU	Cosenza (Italy)	Loan	Summer	—	
30	MF	(Romania)	Ovidiu Horșia	19	EU	Gaz Metan Mediaș	Loan	Summer	—	
44	DF	(Romania)	Gabriel Enache	30	EU	Zhetysu (Kazakhstan)	End of contract	Winter	Free	
40	DF	(Romania)	Ștefan Cană	20	EU	Politehnica Iași	Loan	Winter	—	
6	DF	(Romania)	Marius Briceag	28	EU	Voluntari	Transfer	Winter	Free	
22	FW	(Romania)	Cristian Dumitru	19	EU	Argeș Pitești	Loan	Winter	—	
12	GK	(Romania)	Răzvan Ducan	19	EU	Mioveni	Loan	Winter	—	
9	FW	(Romania)	Sergiu Buș	28	EU	Seongnam (South Korea)	Transfer	Winter	€300,000	
98	FW	(Romania)	Dennis Man	22	EU	Parma (Italy)	Transfer	Winter	€13,000,000	
19	FW	(Romania)	Adrian Petre	22	EU	UTA Arad	Transfer	Winter	Free	

EU = if holds or not a European Union passport; Country: when 2 flags, 1st flag = country that plays for internationally, 2nd flag = country of birth; N = number on jersey; P = Position (for position name, pause mouse pointer on abbreviation); Name = Name on jersey (for more extensive name, pause mouse pointer on name); Age = age on the day of the signing; Moving from = only indicate the club the player was playing before start playing for this club in this season, for the type of the moving see Status column; Moving to = only indicates the club the player is going to play next, for the type of the moving see Status column; Ends = when the player's current contract ends; n/a = Not applicable.

==== Overall transfer activity ====
===== Expenditure =====
Summer: ▼€0,050,000

Winter: ▼€1,060,000

Total: ▼€1,110,000

===== Income =====
Summer: ▲€0

Winter: ▲€13,300,000

Total: ▲€13,300,000

===== Net Totals =====
Summer: ▼€0,050,000

Winter: ▼€12,240,000

Total: ▲€12,190,000

== Friendly matches ==
Win Draw Loss

15 January 2021 Corendon Cup	Kemerspor (Turkey)	2–3	(Romania) FCSB	Belek, Turkey
EEST (UTC+3)			Vînă 15'; Oaidă 25' (55)	Stadium: Gloria Sports Arena

== Competitions ==
Win Draw Loss

=== Overview ===
Competition	First match	Last match	Starting round	Final position	Record							
Competition	First match	Last match	Starting round	Final position	Pld	W	D	L	GF	GA	GD	Win %
Liga I	22 August 2021	25 May 2021	Matchday 1	2nd	12	10	0	2	34	12	+22	83.33
Cupa României	30 November 2020	10 February 2021	Round of 32	Round of 16	0	0	0	0	0	0	+0	—
Supercupa României	15 April 2021		Final	Runners-up	0	0	0	0	0	0	+0	—
Europa League	27 August 2020	24 September 2020	First qualifying round	Third qualifying round	3	1	1	1	9	8	+1	33.33
Total					15	11	1	3	43	20	+23	73.33

Last updated: 7 November 2020.
Source: Competitions

=== Supercupa României ===
15 April 2021 Final	CFR Cluj	0–0 (4–1 p)	FCSB	Ploiești
EET (UTC+02)				Stadium: Ilie Oană Stadium; Attendance: 0 Referee: Radu Petrescu
	Penalties
	Rondón (penalty scored); Chipciu (penalty scored); Păun (penalty scored); Camora (penalty scored)		(penalty scored) Radunović; (penalty missed) Perianu; (penalty missed) Șut

=== Liga I ===
==== Regular season ====
===== Table =====
Pos	Team	Pld	W	D	L	GF	GA	GD	Pts	Qualification
1	FCSB	30	20	5	5	57	22	+35	65	Qualification for the Play-off round
2	CFR Cluj	30	19	7	4	42	15	+27	64	Qualification for the Play-off round
3	Universitatea Craiova	30	16	10	4	33	14	+19	58	Qualification for the Play-off round
4	Sepsi OSK	30	10	15	5	43	31	+12	45	Qualification for the Play-off round
5	Academica Clinceni	30	10	14	6	30	26	+4	44	Qualification for the Play-off round

Source: LPF (in Romanian), Soccerway
Rules for classification: 1) Points; 2) Head-to-head points; 3) Head-to-head goal difference; 4) Head-to-head goals scored; 5) Goal difference; 6) Goals scored; 7) Play-off.

===== Results summary =====
Overall								Home						Away					
Pld	W	D	L	GF	GA	GD	Pts	W	D	L	GF	GA	GD	W	D	L	GF	GA	GD
27	19	3	5	53	21	+32	60	11	1	1	32	7	+25	8	2	4	21	14	+7

Last updated: 13 March 2021.
Source: FCSB

===== Position by round =====
Round	1	2	3	4	5	6	7	8	9	10	11	12	13	14	15	16	17	18	19	20	21	22	23	24	25	26	27	28	29	30
Ground	A	H	A	H	A	H	A	H	A	H	A	H	A	A	H	H	A	H	A	H	A	H	A	H	A	H	A	H	H	A
Result	W	W	L	W	L	W	W	W	W	W	W	W	L	W	D	W	D	W	D	W	W	L	L	W	W	W	W	W	D	D
Position	1	1	5	3	3	2	2	2	2	1	1	1	1	1	1	1	1	1	1	1	1	1	1	1	1	1	1	1	1	1

Updated to match(es) played on 13 March 2021 (UTC). Source: Matches
A = Away; H = Home; W = Win; D = Draw; L = Loss

===== Results =====
22 August 2020 1	Astra Giurgiu	0–3	FCSB	Giurgiu
21:00 EEST (UTC+03)	Răduț (yellow card) 42'; Radunović (yellow card) 67'; Dandea (yellow card) 74'		Man 34'; Tănase 37'; Cristea (yellow card) 39'; Miron (yellow card) 74'; Moruțan 90+1' (pen.); Coman (yellow card) 90+3'	Stadium: Marin Anastasovici; Attendance: 0 Referee: Marian Barbui; Assistant referees: George Florin Neacşu, Daniel Mitruţi; Fourth official: Horia Gabriel

30 August 2020 2	FCSB	3–0	Viitorul Constanța	Bucharest
21:00 EEST (UTC+03)	Tănase 2'; Mladen 50' (o.g.); Vînă 90+1'		Chițu (yellow card) 27'	Stadium: Arena Națională; Attendance: 0 Referee: Ovidiu Hațegan; Assistant referees: Octavian Şovre, Sebastian Gheorghe; Fourth official: Sebastian Colţescu

12 September 2020 3	Voluntari	2–1	FCSB	Voluntari
21:00 EEST (UTC+03)	Mailat 29'; Costin (yellow card) 45'; Ricardinho 64'; Rîmniceanu (yellow card) 90+2'		Man 86'	Stadium: Anghel Iordănescu; Attendance: 0 Referee: Horia Mladinovici; Assistant referees: Avram Valentin, George Florin Neacşu; Fourth official: Iulian Dima

20 September 2020 4	FCSB	3–0	Argeș Pitești	Bucharest
21:30 EEST (UTC+03)	Panțîru (yellow card) 2'; Man 14', 22', 72'		Turda (yellow card) 75'	Stadium: Arena Națională; Attendance: 0 Referee: Ionuţ Coza; Assistant referees: Florin Păunescu, Marius Marchidanu; Fourth official: Alexandru Deaconu

27 September 2020 5	Politehnica Iași	5–2	FCSB	Iași
21:30 EEST (UTC+03)	A. Cristea 9', 22', 53', (yellow card) 39'; Passaglia 19'; Breeveld (yellow card) 36'; Calcan (yellow card) 67', (goal) 71'; Vanzo (yellow card) 81'; F. Cristea (yellow card) 89'		Istrate 9'; Panțîru (yellow card) 15'; Miron (yellow card) 38'; Buș (yellow card) 46'; Tănase 71'; Olaru (yellow card) 79' (red card) 80'; Enache (yellow card) 85'	Stadium: Emil Alexandrescu; Attendance: 0 Referee: Horaţiu Feşnic; Assistant referees: Avram Valentin, Mircea Orbuleţ; Fourth official: Marcel Barsan

3 October 2020 6	FCSB	3–2	Dinamo București	Bucharest
21:00 EEST (UTC+03)	Tănase 8', 75' (pen.), (yellow card) 16'; Cristea 17'; Panțîru (yellow card) 25'; Ov. Popescu (yellow card) 61'; Man (yellow card) 81'; Vlad (yellow card) 90+1'; Buziuc (yellow card) 90+2'		Cámara (yellow card) 16'; Valle 26' (pen.), (yellow card) 29'; Nemec 42'; Gol (yellow card) 52'; Răuță (yellow card) 69' (yellow-red card) 90+2'; López (red card) 75'	Stadium: Arena Națională; Attendance: 0 Referee: Radu Petrescu; Assistant referees: Nicoară Marius, Marius Mihai Marica; Fourth official: Ştefan Constantin

19 October 2020 7	Academica Clinceni	0–2	FCSB	Clinceni
21:00 EEST (UTC+03)	Cordea (yellow card) 39'; Cascini (yellow card) 59'; Petriche (yellow card) 78'		Man (yellow card) 68', (goal) 86'; Cristea (yellow card) 75'; Moruțan 89'	Stadium: Clinceni; Attendance: 0 Referee: Adrian Cojocaru; Assistant referees: Alexandru Vodă, Marius Marchidanu; Fourth official: Sorin Costreie

26 October 2020 8	FCSB	5–0	Hermannstadt	Bucharest
21:00 EET (UTC+02)	Cristea 3'; Man 11'; Buș 32'; Moruțan 34'; Tănase 73'; Vînă (yellow card) 83'		Dâlbea (yellow card) 7'; Viera (yellow card) 39'; Alhassan (yellow card) 83'	Stadium: Arena Națională; Attendance: 0 Referee: Horaţiu Feşnic; Assistant referees: Mircea Orbuleţ, Daniel Mitruţi; Fourth official: Cristian Nica

2 November 2020 9	Chindia Târgoviște	0–2	FCSB	Giurgiu
21:00 EET (UTC+02)			Cristea 23'; Tănase 56', (yellow card) 58'	Stadium: Marin Anastasovici; Attendance: 0 Referee: Andrei Chivulete; Assistant referees: Andrei Constantinescu, Bogdan Mugurel Velicu; Fourth official: Cătălin Ion Buşi

7 November 2020 10	FCSB	4–1	Botoșani	Bucharest
21:45 EET (UTC+02)	Man 21', 53'; Tănase 52' (pen.), 71'; Șut (yellow card) 63'; Miron (yellow card) 77'		Rodríguez (yellow card) 23'; Șeroni (yellow card) 44'	Stadium: Arena Națională; Attendance: 0 Referee: Ovidiu Hațegan; Assistant referees: Octavian Şovre, Radu Ghinguleac; Fourth official: Iulian Dima

23 November 2020 11	Gaz Metan Mediaș	2-3	FCSB	Mediaș
21:00 EET (UTC+02)	Deaconu 16', pen.' Valente 60'; Dumitru (yellow card) 17'; Butean (yellow card) 58'; Júnior (yellow card) 83'; Alceus (yellow card) 90+3'		Olaru 11' (31); Buș 90' (pen.); Popescu (yellow card) 90+4'	Stadium: Gaz Metan; Attendance: 0

5 December 2020 12	FCSB	3–0	UTA Arad	Bucharest
21:30 EET (UTC+02)	Man 76' (pen.); Coman 90'; Olaru 90+2'; Panțîru (yellow card) 42'; Cretu (yellow card) 67'		Nelut Rosu (yellow card) 12' (red card) 58'; Miculescu (yellow card) 42'; Morar (yellow card) 49'; Hora (yellow card) 71'	Stadium: Arena Națională; Attendance: 0

13 December 2020 13	CFR Cluj	2–0	FCSB	Cluj-Napoca
21:00 EET (UTC+02)	Deac (yellow card) 9' (goal) 35' (pen.); Costache (yellow card) 15' (goal) 73'; Paulo Vinícius (yellow card) 27'; Soares (yellow card) 40'; Chipciu (yellow card) 41'; Sušić (yellow card) 44'; Manea (yellow card) 82'; Đoković (yellow card) 89'; Bălgrădean (yellow card) 90'	Report	Crețu (yellow card) 34'; Miron (yellow card) 34'; Moruțan (yellow card) 90+2'	Stadium: Stadionul Dr. Constantin Rădulescu; Attendance: 0 Referee: (Romania) István Kovács (referee)
Note: COVID-19 pandemic in Romania

18 December 2020 14	Universitatea Craiova	0–2	FCSB	Craiova
20:30 EET (UTC+02)	Constantin (yellow card) 26'; Pigliacelli (yellow card) 79'	Report	Man 39' 55'; Coman (yellow card) 50'	Stadium: Stadionul Ion Oblemenco; Attendance: 0 Referee: (Romania) Ovidiu Hațegan
Note: COVID-19 pandemic in Romania

21 December 2020 15	FCSB	1–1	Sepsi	Buftea
20:30 EET (UTC+02)	Cristea 30'; Crețu (yellow card) 45'; Ovidiu Popescu (yellow card) 61'; Vînă (yellow card) 90+2'	Report	Fofana 37'; Ștefănescu (yellow card) 53'; Mitrea (yellow card) 69'	Stadium: Stadionul CNAF; Attendance: 0 Referee: (Romania) Horațiu Mircea Feșnic
Note: COVID-19 pandemic in Romania

15 January 2021 16	FCSB	3–0	Astra	Bucharest
20:00 EET (UTC+02)	Octavian Popescu (yellow card) 47'; Tănase (yellow card) 67' (goal) 81' 88'; Man 77'	Report	Găman (yellow card) 64'	Stadium: Arena Națională; Attendance: 0 Referee: (Romania) Marcel Bîrsan
Note: COVID-19 pandemic in Romania

19 January 2021 17	Viitorul	2–2	FCSB	Ovidiu
20:00 EET (UTC+02)	Matei 17' (pen.); Artean (yellow card) 34'; Boboc (yellow card) 55'; Mladen (yellow card) 59'; Ely Fernandes 73'; Cojocaru (yellow card) 90+3'	Report	Tănase 56' (pen.); Dussaut 70' (o.g.); Buziuc (yellow card) 77'	Stadium: Stadionul Viitorul; Attendance: 0 Referee: (Romania) István Kovács (referee)
Note: COVID-19 pandemic in Romania

22 January 2021 18	FCSB	2–1	Voluntari	Bucharest
20:00 EET (UTC+02)	Coman (yellow card) 31'; Man 37'; Șut (yellow card) 58'; Olaru (yellow card) 69'; Tănase 71' (pen.)	Report	Mailat (yellow card) 3'; Borțoneanu (yellow card) 32'; Jefté Betancor 90+3' (pen.)	Stadium: Arena Națională; Attendance: 0 Referee: (Romania) Florin Andrei
Note: COVID-19 pandemic in Romania

26 January 2021 19	Argeș	0–0	FCSB	Pitești
19:45 EET (UTC+02)	Tofan (yellow card) 84'	Report	Șut (yellow card) 23'; Perianu (yellow card) 66'	Stadium: Stadionul Nicolae Dobrin; Attendance: 0 Referee: (Romania) Iulian Dima
Note: COVID-19 pandemic in Romania

=== Cupa României ===
30 November 2020 Round of 32	Gloria Buzău	0–3	FCSB	Buzău
10:45 EET (UTC+02)		Report		Stadium: Municipal

10 February 2021 Round of 16	Dinamo București	1–0	FCSB	București
20:30 EET (UTC+02)	Nepomuceno (yellow card) 38'; Morsay (yellow card) 47'; Sorescu (yellow card) 46'; Nemec 55'; Puljić (yellow card) 90+1'	Report	Șut (yellow card) 45'; Tănase (yellow card) 81'	Stadium: Stadionul Dinamo; Attendance: 0 Referee: (Romania) Ovidiu Hațegan
Note: COVID-19 pandemic in Romania

=== UEFA Europa League ===
==== Qualifying rounds ====
27 August 2020 First qualifying round	FCSB (Romania)	3–0	(Armenia) Shirak	Bucharest, Romania
21:30 EEST (UTC+03)	Olaru 34'; Cristea (yellow card) 43'; Tănase 65' (pen.); Buziuc 83'	Report	Margaryan (yellow card) 22'; Mkoyan (yellow card) 65'	Stadium: Arena Națională; Attendance: 0 Referee: Admir Šehović (Bosnia and Herzegovina); Assistant referees: Amer Macić, Goran Dujak; Fourth official: Haris Kaljanac

17 September 2020 Second qualifying round	TSC Bačka Topola (Serbia)	6–6 (a.e.t.) (4–5 p)	(Romania) FCSB	Senta, Serbia
22:00 EEST (UTC+03)	Milićević 11'; Duronjić 14'; Zec (yellow card) 31'; Ponjević (yellow card) 34' (yellow-red card) 44'; Antonić 51'; Tomanović 90+4', 117', (yellow card) 103'; Silađi (red card) 103'; Tumbasević 105+1'	Report	Coman 25', (yellow card) 41'; Man 50', 63' (pen.), 105'; Balaž 90+3' (o.g.); Petre 108'; Moruțan (yellow card) 112'	Stadium: City Stadium; Attendance: 0 Referee: Dennis Higler (Netherlands); Assistant referees: Charles Schaap, Jan de Vries; Fourth official: Siemen Mulder
	Penalties
	Tomanović (penalty scored); Zec (penalty scored); Banjac (penalty missed); Antonić (penalty scored); Đurić (penalty scored)		(penalty scored) Moruțan; (penalty scored) Perianu; (penalty scored) Panțîru; (penalty scored) Petre; (penalty scored) Man

24 September 2020 Third qualifying round	FCSB (Romania)	0–2	(Czech Republic) Slovan Liberec	Giurgiu, Romania
20:30 EEST (UTC+03)	Perianu (yellow card) 14'; Cană (red card) 20'; Petre (yellow card) 51'	Report	Pešek (yellow card) 44'; Beran (yellow card) 47'; Abdulla 64', (yellow card) 69'; Rabušic 82'	Stadium: Marin Anastasovici; Attendance: 0 Referee: Aliyar Aghayev (Azerbaijan); Assistant referees: Zeynal Zeynalov, Akif Amirali; Fourth official: Orkhan Mammadov

== Statistics ==
=== Goalscorers ===
As of 7 November 2020

Rank	Position	Name	Liga I	Cupa României	Supercupa României	Europa League	Total
1	FW	(Romania) Dennis Man	10	0	0	3	13
2	FW	(Romania) Florin Tănase	9	0	0	1	10
3	MF	(Romania) Darius Olaru	3	0	0	1	4
4	MF	(Romania) Olimpiu Moruțan	3	0	0	0	3
4	DF	(Romania) Iulian Cristea	3	0	0	0	3
6	FW	(Romania) Sergiu Bus	2	0	0	0	2
6	FW	(Romania) Florinel Coman	1	0	0	1	2
8	MF	(Romania) Ionuț Vînă	1	0	0	0	1
8	FW	(Romania) Andrei Istrate	1	0	0	0	1
8	FW	(Romania) Alexandru Buziuc	0	0	0	1	1
8	FW	(Romania) Adrian Petre	0	0	0	1	1
Own goal			1	0	0	1	2
Total			22	0	0	9	31

=== Goal minutes ===
	1'–15'	16'–30'	31'–HT	46'–60'	61'–75'	76'–FT	Extra time	Forfeit
Goals	6	5	5	5	7	7	2	0
Percentage	16.22%	13.51%	13.51%	13.51%	18.92%	18.92%	5.41%	0%

Last updated: 7 November 2020 (UTC)
Source: FCSB (in Romanian)

=== Hat-tricks ===
Player	Against	Result	Date	Competition
(Romania) Dennis Man	(Romania) Argeș Pitești	3–0 (H)	20 September 2020	Liga I
(Romania) Dennis Man	(Serbia) TSC Bačka Topola	6–6 (A)	17 September 2020	Europa League

(H) – Home; (A) – Away

=== Clean sheets ===
As of 7 November 2020

Rank	Name	Liga I	Cupa României	Supercupa României	Europa League	Total	Games played
1	(Romania) Andrei Vlad	5	0	0	1	6	9
2	(Romania) Cătălin Straton	1	0	0	0	1	3
3	(Romania) Răzvan Ducan	0	0	0	0	0	1
Total		6	0	0	1	7	13

=== Disciplinary record ===
As of 26 October 2020

Rank	Position	Name	Liga I			Cupa României			Supercupa României			Europa League			Total		
Rank	Position	Name	Booked	(yellow card) (yellow-red card)	Sent off (straight red)	Booked	(yellow card) (yellow-red card)	Sent off (straight red)	Booked	(yellow card) (yellow-red card)	Sent off (straight red)	Booked	(yellow card) (yellow-red card)	Sent off (straight red)	Booked	(yellow card) (yellow-red card)	Sent off (straight red)
1	DF	(Romania) Ionuț Panțîru	3	0	0	0	0	0	0	0	0	0	0	0	3	0	0
1	DF	(Romania) Iulian Cristea	2	0	0	0	0	0	0	0	0	1	0	0	3	0	0
3	MF	(Romania) Darius Olaru	1	0	1	0	0	0	0	0	0	0	0	0	1	0	1
3	DF	(Romania) George Miron	2	0	0	0	0	0	0	0	0	0	0	0	2	0	0
3	FW	(Romania) Dennis Man	2	0	0	0	0	0	0	0	0	0	0	0	2	0	0
3	FW	(Romania) Florinel Coman	1	0	0	0	0	0	0	0	0	1	0	0	2	0	0
4	DF	(Romania) Ștefan Cană	0	0	0	0	0	0	0	0	0	0	0	1	0	0	1
4	FW	(Romania) Sergiu Buș	1	0	0	0	0	0	0	0	0	0	0	0	1	0	0
4	DF	(Romania) Gabriel Enache	1	0	0	0	0	0	0	0	0	0	0	0	1	0	0
4	FW	(Romania) Florin Tănase	1	0	0	0	0	0	0	0	0	0	0	0	1	0	0
4	MF	(Romania) Ovidiu Popescu	1	0	0	0	0	0	0	0	0	0	0	0	1	0	0
4	GK	(Romania) Andrei Vlad	1	0	0	0	0	0	0	0	0	0	0	0	1	0	0
4	FW	(Romania) Alexandru Buziuc	1	0	0	0	0	0	0	0	0	0	0	0	1	0	0
4	MF	(Romania) Ionuț Vînă	1	0	0	0	0	0	0	0	0	0	0	0	1	0	0
4	MF	(Romania) Olimpiu Moruțan	0	0	0	0	0	0	0	0	0	1	0	0	1	0	0
4	MF	(Romania) Ovidiu Perianu	0	0	0	0	0	0	0	0	0	1	0	0	1	0	0
4	FW	(Romania) Adrian Petre	0	0	0	0	0	0	0	0	0	1	0	0	1	0	0
Total			18	0	1	0	0	0	0	0	0	5	0	1	23	0	2

=== Attendances ===
As of 30 June 2021

	Matches	Attendances	Average	High	Low
Liga I	20	0	0	0	0^{1}
Cupa României	0	0	0	0	0
Europa League	2	0	0	0	0
Total	22	0	0	0	0^{1}

^{1}Impact of the COVID-19 pandemic on association football

== See also ==
- 2020–21 Cupa României
- 2020–21 Liga I
- 2020–21 UEFA Europa League
