= Ștefan Cană =

Romanian association football player (born 2000)

Personal information
- Full name: Ștefan Marian Cană
- Date of birth: 7 August 2000 (age 26)
- Place of birth: Heci, Romania
- Height: 1.80 m (5 ft 11 in)
- Position: Centre-back

Team information
- Current team: SCM Zalău

Youth career
- –2016: LPS Iași
- 2016–2019: FCSB

Senior career*
Years	Team	Apps	(Gls)
2019–2023	FCSB	2	(0)
2019–2020	→ Farul Constanța (loan)	20	(0)
2021–2022	→ Politehnica Iași (loan)	31	(0)
2022	→ Unirea Constanța (loan)	16	(0)
2023	→ Foresta Suceava (loan)	9	(1)
2023–2024	CSM Alexandria	22	(2)
2024–2025	Afumați	8	(0)
2025	CSU Alba Iulia	?	(?)
2025–	SCM Zalău	0	(0)

International career
2018	Romania U18	1	(0)
- * Club domestic league appearances and goals as of 14 December 2024

Ștefan Marian Cană (born 7 August 2000) is a Romanian professional footballer who plays as a centre-back for Liga III club SCM Zalău.

== Career statistics ==
As of 14 December 2024

Appearances and goals by club, season and competition
Club	Season	League			Cupa României		Europe		Other		Total	
Club	Season	Division	Apps	Goals	Apps	Goals	Apps	Goals	Apps	Goals	Apps	Goals
Farul Constanța (loan)	2019–20	Liga II	18	0	0	0	—		—		18	0
Farul Constanța (loan)	2020–21	Liga II	2	0	0	0	—		—		2	0
Farul Constanța (loan)	Total		20	0	0	0	—		—		20	0
FCSB	2020–21	Liga I	2	0	0	0	1 (Note: Appearance in UEFA Europa League)	0	—		3	0
Politehnica Iași (loan)	2020–21	Liga I	7	0	1	0	—		—		8	0
Politehnica Iași (loan)	2021–22	Liga II	24	0	0	0	—		—		24	0
Politehnica Iași (loan)	Total		31	0	1	0	—		—		32	0
Unirea Constanța (loan)	2022–23	Liga II	16	0	0	0	—		—		16	0
Foresta Suceava (loan)	2022–23	Liga III	9	1	—		—		4 (Note: Appearances in Liga III promotion play-offs)	0	13	1
CSM Alexandria	2023–24	Liga II	22	2	4	0	—		—		26	2
Afumați	2024–25	Liga II	8	0	3	0	—		—		11	0
CSU Alba Iulia	2024–25	Liga III	0	0	—		—		—		0	0
SCM Zalău	2025–26	Liga III	0	0	0	0	—		—		0	0
Career total			108	3	8	0	1	0	4	0	121	3

== Honours ==
Foresta Suceava

- Liga III: 2022–23
