= Sergiu Buș =

Romanian footballer (born 1992)

Personal information
- Full name: Sergiu Florin Buș
- Date of birth: 2 November 1992 (age 34)
- Place of birth: Cluj-Napoca, Romania
- Height: 1.80 m (5 ft 11 in)
- Position: Forward

Team information
- Current team: CFR Cluj
- Number: 19

Youth career
- –2009: CFR Cluj

Senior career*
Years	Team	Apps	(Gls)
2009–2014	CFR Cluj	19	(3)
2010	→ Unirea Alba Iulia (loan)	12	(2)
2011–2012	→ FCM Târgu Mureș (loan)	22	(6)
2012	→ Gaz Metan Mediaș (loan)	3	(0)
2013–2014	→ Corona Brașov (loan)	28	(9)
2014–2015	CSKA Sofia	19	(10)
2015–2017	Sheffield Wednesday	9	(1)
2016	→ Salernitana (loan)	11	(1)
2017	Astra Giurgiu	9	(2)
2017–2019	Levski Sofia	47	(10)
2019–2020	Gaz Metan Mediaș	30	(10)
2020–2021	FCSB	10	(2)
2021	Seongnam	18	(1)
2022–2023	CFR Cluj	8	(0)
2023	→ Chindia Târgoviște (loan)	16	(0)
2023–2024	Politehnica Iași	30	(3)
2024	Corvinul Hunedoara	0	(0)
2024–2026	Hermannstadt	69	(11)
2026–	CFR Cluj	7	(1)

International career
2009–2010	Romania U17	3	(1)
2010–2011	Romania U19	4	(2)
2011–2014	Romania U21	5	(1)
- * Club domestic league appearances and goals as of 31 October 2026

Sergiu Florin Buș (born 2 November 1992) is a Romanian professional footballer who plays as a forward for Liga I club CFR Cluj.

== Club career ==
=== CFR Cluj ===
Born in Cluj-Napoca, Buș began his senior career at CFR Cluj, where he totalled three goals from 19 Liga I appearances while playing sporadically between 2009 and 2014. Whilst under contract with CFR, he was loaned out to Liga II team Unirea Alba Iulia and Liga I teams Târgu Mureș, Gaz Metan Mediaș and Corona Brașov, respectively.

=== CSKA Sofia ===
On 7 July 2014, Sergiu Buș moved to Bulgarian side CSKA Sofia, under a two-year contract. He scored his first goal for "the Reds" 20 days later, in an Eternal derby 2–0 win over Levski Sofia. He repeated the feat on 25 October that year, netting the second in a 3–0 win.

=== Sheffield Wednesday ===
On 2 February 2015, Buș was signed by English club Sheffield Wednesday for an undisclosed fee. He registered his debut in the Football League Championship five days later, being brought on as a 63rd-minute substitute and obtaining the penalty converted by Will Keane for a 1–1 home draw with Cardiff City. He scored his only goal for Wednesday in a 1–1 draw with Huddersfield Town, on 4 April 2015. On 2 February 2016, Buș moved to Italian side Salernitana on loan for the remainder of the Serie B season.

At the start of 2017, he returned to Romania and signed for Astra Giurgiu, for which he started in the Cupa României final 3–5 loss on penalties to FC Voluntari on 27 May. The following month, Levski Sofia confirmed the signing of Buș as a free agent. He played his second successive national cup final on 9 May 2018, as Levski lost 2–4 on penalties to Slavia Sofia. Buș was re-signed by Gaz Metan Mediaș for the 2019–20 Liga I season, and managed to score ten goals from 30 games in the competition, which inspired a move to FCSB.

Buș did not adapt in Bucharest and was sold for a rumoured €450,000 to K League 1 team Seongnam, on 21 January 2021. On 13 December 2021, after less than a year in South Korea, it was announced that Buș rejoined his boyhood club CFR Cluj.

== International career ==
Buș was capped for the Romania national team at under-17, under-19 and under-21 levels. He was called up for the first time to the seniors for the UEFA Nations League group matches against Northern Ireland and Austria in September 2020, but did not make his debut.

== Personal life ==
Buș's elder brother, Laurențiu, is also a professional footballer. The latter represented CFR Cluj's rivals from Universitatea Cluj at both junior and senior levels.

== Career statistics ==
As of 31 October 2026

Appearances and goals by club, season and competition
Club	Season	League			National cup (Note: Includes Cupa României, Bulgarian Cup)		League cup (Note: Includes EFL Cup)		Continental		Other		Total	
Club	Season	Division	Apps	Goals	Apps	Goals	Apps	Goals	Apps	Goals	Apps	Goals	Apps	Goals
CFR Cluj	2009–10	Liga I	1	0	0	0	—		4 (Note: Appearance(s) in UEFA Europa League)	0	0	0	5	0
CFR Cluj	2010–11	Liga I	12	1	0	0	—		0	0	—		12	1
CFR Cluj	2011–12	Liga I	0	0	—		—		0	0	—		0	0
CFR Cluj	2012–13	Liga I	6	2	0	0	—		0	0	—		6	2
CFR Cluj	Total		19	3	0	0	—		4	0	0	0	23	3
Unirea Alba Iulia (loan)	2010–11	Liga II	12	2	0	0	—		—		—		12	2
Târgu Mureș (loan)	2011–12	Liga I	22	6	1	0	—		—		—		23	6
Gaz Metan Mediaș (loan)	2012–13	Liga I	3	0	—		—		—		—		3	0
Corona Brașov (loan)	2013–14	Liga I	28	9	0	0	—		—		—		28	9
CSKA Sofia	2014–15	A Group	19	10	1	0	—		1	0	—		21	10
Sheffield Wednesday	2014–15	EFL Championship	7	1	—		—		—		—		7	1
Sheffield Wednesday	2015–16	EFL Championship	2	0	0	0	1	0	—		—		3	0
Sheffield Wednesday	Total		9	1	0	0	1	0	—		—		10	1
Salernitana (loan)	2015–16	Serie B	11	1	—		—		—		—		11	1
Astra Giurgiu	2016–17	Liga I	9	2	3	1	—		2	0	—		14	3
Levski Sofia	2017–18	First League	29	8	5	3	—		4	1	—		38	12
Levski Sofia	2018–19	First League	18	2	1	1	—		2	1	—		21	4
Levski Sofia	Total		47	10	6	4	—		6	2	—		59	16
Gaz Metan Mediaș	2019–20	Liga I	30	10	1	1	—		—		—		31	11
FCSB	2020–21	Liga I	10	2	0	0	—		1	0	0	0	11	2
Seongnam	2021	K League 1	18	1	0	0	—		—		—		18	1
CFR Cluj	2021–22	Liga I	4	0	—		—		—		—		4	0
CFR Cluj	2022–23	Liga I	4	0	2	0	—		3 (Note: Appearances in UEFA Europa Conference League)	0	0	0	9	0
CFR Cluj	Total		8	0	1	0	—		3	0	0	0	12	0
Chindia Târgoviște (loan)	2022–23	Liga I	16	0	—		—		—		—		16	0
Politehnica Iaşi	2023–24	Liga I	30	3	1	0	—		—		—		31	3
Corvinul Hunedoara	2024–25	Liga II	0	0	0	0	—		5 (Note: Four appearances and one goal in UEFA Europa League, one appearance in UEFA Conference League)	1	1 (Note: Appearance in Supercupa României)	0	7	1
Hermannstadt	2024–25	Liga I	32	3	6	3	—		—		—		38	6
Hermannstadt	2025–26	Liga I	37	8	3	1	—		—		2 (Note: Appearances in Liga I promotion/relegation play-offs)	1	42	10
Hermannstadt	Total		69	11	9	4	—		—		2	1	80	16
CFR Cluj	2026–27	Liga I	7	1	1	1	—		—		—		8	2
Career total			367	72	25	11	1	0	22	3	3	1	418	87

== Honours ==
CFR Cluj

- Liga I: 2009–10, 2021–22
- Cupa României: 2009–10; runner-up: 2012–13
- Supercupa României: 2010

Astra Giurgiu

- Cupa României runner-up: 2016–17

Levski Sofia

- Bulgarian Cup runner-up: 2017–18

Corvinul Hunedoara

- Supercupa României runner-up: 2024

Hermannstadt

- Cupa României runner-up: 2024–25
