= Dennis Man =

Romanian footballer (born 1998)

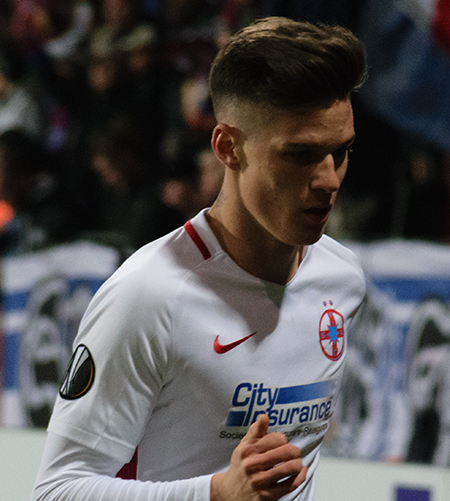
- Man with FCSB in 2017

Personal information
- Date of birth: 26 August 1998 (age 28)
- Place of birth: Vladimirescu, Romania
- Height: 1.85 m (6 ft 1 in)
- Positions: Winger; attacking midfielder

Team information
- Current team: PSV
- Number: 27

Youth career
- 2005–2009: CS Vladimirescu
- 2009–2014: Atletico Arad
- 2014–2015: UTA Arad

Senior career*
Years	Team	Apps	(Gls)
2015–2016	UTA Arad	34	(15)
2016–2021	FCSB	114	(41)
2021–2025	Parma	133	(26)
2025–	PSV	31	(7)

International career^{‡}
2016	Romania U19	4	(1)
2017–2020	Romania U21	20	(6)
2018–	Romania	50	(13)
- * Club domestic league appearances and goals as of 8 November 2026 ‡ National team caps and goals as of 17 November 2026

Dennis Man (born 26 August 1998) is a Romanian professional footballer who plays as a winger or an attacking midfielder for Eredivisie club PSV and the Romania national team.

Man began his senior career at UTA Arad in 2015, and moved to FCSB in 2016. He was named in the Liga I Team of the Year for the 2018–19 season, and won the Cupa României the following campaign. Later in 2020, Man was voted Gazeta Sporturilor's Romanian Footballer of the Year, before transferring abroad to Parma for €11 million—the highest fee ever received for a player sold from the Romanian championship. In 2025, after more than 130 appearances in the Serie A and Serie B combined, he signed for Dutch club PSV.

Internationally, Man made his senior debut for Romania in March 2018, being previously capped at under-19 and under-21 levels. He represented his country in the UEFA Euro 2024, where they achieved first place in their group and advanced to the round of 16.

== Club career ==
=== Early career ===
While a junior at Atletico Arad, Man traveled to English club Manchester City for several trials, but nothing came of it and later joined UTA Arad. Man was promoted from the UTA academy in the summer of 2015, aged 17, and made his senior debut on 29 August in a 2–1 loss to Gaz Metan Mediaș for the Liga II championship. On 25 October, he scored his first goal for the club in a 4–0 away win over Bihor Oradea.

=== FCSB ===
On 6 September 2016, FC Steaua București transferred Man for an undisclosed fee, with the player penning a one-year deal with the option of another five years. Man made his debut for the Roș-albaștrii on 2 October 2016 against Universitatea Craiova, coming on as a substitute for injured Florin Tănase in the first half of the game; he himself was replaced in the 66th minute by Ovidiu Popescu, as his team eventually won 2–1. Later that month he netted his first Steaua—and Liga I—goal in a 2–0 victory over Politehnica Iași.

On 16 July 2017, Man scored an injury-time winner against Voluntari in the campaign's opener. He recorded his first European appearance in the UEFA Champions League's third qualifying round 4–1 away win against Viktoria Plzeň, on 2 August. On 25 October, he contributed with two goals and two assists in the 6–1 thrashing of Sănătatea Cluj for the Cupa României, and on 17 December opened the scoring in a 2–0 success over defending champions Viitorul Constanța.

In January 2018, Man was included by UEFA.com in a list of the 50 best young footballers to watch for that year. On 18 February, he scored the first of his team in a 2–2 draw to rivals Dinamo București after appearing as a half-time substitute. In July, Man was nominated along with compatriot Ianis Hagi for the 2018 Golden Boy award. On the 25th that month, he scored his first European goal in a Europa League second qualifying round 2–0 away win over Rudar Velenje.

Man won his first career trophy on 22 July 2020, after scoring the only goal of the Cupa României final played against Sepsi OSK. On 17 September that year, he scored a hat-trick in a Europa League second qualifying round away draw with Serbian team TSC Bačka Topola. The match ended 6–6 after extra time, and Man converted the winning penalty in the eventual shoot-out. Three days later, on his 100th Liga I appearance, he again scored a hat-trick in a 3–0 defeat of Argeș Pitești.

Man scored the opener and refused to celebrate in a 3–0 home win against former club UTA Arad on 5 December 2020, which took his league tally to ten goals. Two fixtures later on the 18th, he netted twice for a 2–0 away victory over title contenders Universitatea Craiova. Shortly after, he was revealed as the winner of the 2020 Romanian Footballer of the Year award by the Gazeta Sporturilor newspaper.

=== Parma ===
On 26 January 2021, FCSB owner Gigi Becali announced that Serie A club Parma submitted a bid for the transfer of Man, worth €11 million plus €2 million in add-ons; he accepted the offer the next day. Parma officialised the move on the 29th, after Man penned a four-and-a-half-year contract. The transfer fee made him the most expensive sale of the Romanian championship, as per FCSB's official website, surpassing the €9.8 million move of former record holder Nicolae Stanciu from 2016.

Man made his Parma debut on 31 January 2021, after coming on in the 80th minute of a 2–0 Serie A loss to Napoli at the Stadio San Paolo. A substitute in his first five matches, he was handed his first start by manager Roberto D'Aversa in a 2–1 home defeat to Inter Milan on 4 March. Ten days later, he assisted Valentin Mihăilă's opening goal in an eventual 2–0 victory over Roma. On 3 April, Man scored his first Serie A goal in a 2–2 away draw with Benevento. An injury effectively ended his season at Parma with two goals in 14 appearances, as the club got relegated to the Serie B.

Man netted his first goal of the 2021–22 campaign on 20 August, in a 2–2 league draw at Frosinone. On 15 March 2022, he wore the captain armband for the first time in a 1–0 win over Vicenza, as Gianluigi Buffon and Franco Vázquez were unavailable for the match. In the 2023–24 season, Man was the team's highest goalscorer with 13 goals across all competitions, as Parma won its first-ever Serie B title and returned to the top flight after a three-year absence.

On 17 August 2024, in the opening fixture of the Serie A season, Man scored a goal in a 1–1 home draw with Fiorentina. One week later, he scored again in a 2–1 away win over AC Milan. Man scored twice more before the end of the calendar year and was named the Gazeta Sporturilor Romanian Footballer of the Year for the second time in his career. However, despite the February 2025 appointment of compatriot Cristian Chivu as head coach, his form declined in the latter half of the season, failing to score again as Parma finished 16th.

=== PSV ===
On 12 August 2025, Man joined Dutch defending champions PSV by signing a four-year contract. The transfer fee was reported to be between €7.5 million and €9 million, depending on bonuses. Man made his debut on 23 August, starting in a 4–2 Eredivisie victory over Groningen and being substituted at half-time.

Man scored his first goal for PSV and provided an assist on 4 October 2025, in a 4–0 away win against PEC Zwolle. On 21 October, he netted twice in a 6–2 home win over Napoli in the Champions League league phase, marking his first goals in the competition and earning the Player of the Match award.

In his first season in the Netherlands, Man made 35 competitive appearances, scoring 11 goals and providing six assists as the club successfully defended its Eredivisie title. During the final days of the 2026 summer transfer window, a proposed loan move to Serie A club Lazio collapsed, which coincided with a reduction in his playing time.

== International career ==
Man was selected for the Romania national under-21 team and scored on debut in a 3–1 away victory over Bosnia and Herzegovina, on 1 September 2017. In March 2018, senior manager Cosmin Contra gave him his first Romania call-up for that month's friendlies against Israel and Sweden. Man made his debut in the latter game, replacing Nicolae Stanciu in the 87th minute of the 1–0 win at the Stadionul Ion Oblemenco in Craiova.

On 11 June 2019, Man netted his first senior international goal in a 4–0 defeat of Malta counting for the UEFA Euro 2020 qualifiers. Later that month, he joined up with the under-21 side for the 2019 European Championship, making three appearances as Romania was eliminated by Germany in the semi-finals.

In 2023, Man totalled four matches and one goal as Romania topped its group in the Euro 2024 qualifiers, missing several fixtures through injury. On 7 June 2024, he was chosen by Edward Iordănescu in the squad for the final tournament. Ten days later, Man provided two assists in a 3–0 win over Ukraine, representing their first victory in the competition in 24 years. He then started in the 0–2 loss to Belgium, and came on in the 66th minute for Ianis Hagi in the 1–1 draw with Slovakia, which secured Romania the group win. On 2 July, he played the full match as they lost 0–3 to the Netherlands in the round of 16.

== Style of play ==
In his early days at UTA Arad, Man was primarily deployed as a centre-forward, but developed into a right winger after his transfer to FCSB. He is however known for his versatility, as he can play almost any attacking position when needed, a trait his Parma manager Giuseppe Iachini encouraged to develop further.

In December 2018, Mirel Rădoi, his under-21 national team coach, praised Man as "the most complete footballer" among young players in the Romanian top flight, citing his "technical ability, pace, physical power, work rate, mental toughness" as qualities that bring him the closest to "the full package".

== Personal life ==
Man's father, Cristian, is a football coach and former player in the Divizia B.

== Career statistics ==
=== Club ===
As of match played 8 November 2026

Appearances and goals by club, season and competition
Club	Season	League			National cup (Note: Includes Cupa României, Coppa Italia, KNVB Beker)		League cup (Note: Includes Cupa Ligii)		Europe		Other		Total	
Club	Season	Division	Apps	Goals	Apps	Goals	Apps	Goals	Apps	Goals	Apps	Goals	Apps	Goals
UTA Arad	2015–16	Liga II	29	10	3	1	—		—		2 (Note: Appearances in Liga I promotion/relegation play-offs)	0	34	11
UTA Arad	2016–17	Liga II	5	5	0	0	—		—		—		5	5
UTA Arad	Total		34	15	3	1	—		—		2	0	39	16
FCSB	2016–17	Liga I	6	1	1	0	2	0	0	0	—		9	1
FCSB	2017–18	Liga I	34	10	3	2	—		10 (Note: Two appearances in UEFA Champions League, eight appearances in UEFA Europa League)	0	—		47	12
FCSB	2018–19	Liga I	33	9	1	0	—		5 (Note: Appearances in UEFA Europa League)	1	—		39	10
FCSB	2019–20	Liga I	23	7	5	2	—		3	0	—		31	9
FCSB	2020–21	Liga I	18	14	0	0	—		2	3	—		20	17
FCSB	Total		114	41	10	4	2	0	20	4	0	0	146	49
Parma	2020–21	Serie A	14	2	0	0	—		—		—		14	2
Parma	2021–22	Serie B	26	3	1	0	—		—		—		27	3
Parma	2022–23	Serie B	28	6	2	0	—		—		2 (Note: Appearances in Serie A promotion play-offs)	0	32	6
Parma	2023–24	Serie B	32	11	3	2	—		—		—		35	13
Parma	2024–25	Serie A	33	4	1	0	—		—		—		34	4
Parma	Total		133	26	7	2	—		—		2	0	142	28
PSV	2025–26	Eredivisie	25	7	2	2	—		8 (Note: Appearances in UEFA Champions League)	2	—		35	11
PSV	2026–27	Eredivisie	6	0	0	0	—		1	0	1 (Note: Appearance in Johan Cruyff Shield)	0	8	0
PSV	Total		31	7	2	2	—		9	2	1	0	43	11
Career total			312	89	22	9	2	0	29	6	5	0	370	104

=== International ===
As of match played 17 November 2026

Appearances and goals by national team and year
National team	Year	Apps	Goals
Romania	2018	2	0
Romania	2019	2	1
Romania	2020	2	0
Romania	2021	7	2
Romania	2022	3	2
Romania	2023	4	1
Romania	2024	13	3
Romania	2025	10	2
Romania	2026	7	2
Total		50	13

Scores and results list Romania's goal tally first, score column indicates score after each Man goal.

List of international goals scored by Dennis Man
No.	Date	Venue	Opponent	Score	Result	Competition
1	10 June 2019	National Stadium, Ta' Qali, Malta	Malta	4–0	4–0	UEFA Euro 2020 qualifying
2	2 September 2021	Laugardalsvöllur, Reykjavík, Iceland	Iceland	1–0	2–0	2022 FIFA World Cup qualification
3	14 November 2021	Rheinpark Stadion, Vaduz, Liechtenstein	Liechtenstein	1–0	2–0	2022 FIFA World Cup qualification
4	29 March 2022	Netanya Stadium, Netanya, Israel	Israel	2–0	2–2	Friendly
5	26 September 2022	Stadionul Rapid-Giulești, Bucharest, Romania	Bosnia and Herzegovina	1–0	4–1	2022–23 UEFA Nations League B
6	25 March 2023	Estadi Nacional, Andorra la Vella, Andorra	Andorra	1–0	2–0	UEFA Euro 2024 qualifying
7	22 March 2024	Arena Națională, Bucharest, Romania	Northern Ireland	1–1	1–1	Friendly
8	6 September 2024	Fadil Vokrri Stadium, Pristina, Kosovo	Kosovo	1–0	3–0	2024–25 UEFA Nations League C
9	12 October 2024	AEK Arena – Georgios Karapatakis, Larnaca, Cyprus	Cyprus	1–0	3–0	2024–25 UEFA Nations League C
10	10 June 2025	Arena Națională, Bucharest, Romania	Cyprus	2–0	2–0	2026 FIFA World Cup qualification
11	18 November 2025	Ilie Oană, Ploiești, Romania	San Marino	3–1	7–1	2026 FIFA World Cup qualification
12	25 September 2026	Nationalarenan, Stockholm, Sweden	Sweden	1–1	1–2	2026–27 UEFA Nations League B
13	14 November 2026	Arena Națională, Bucharest, Romania	Poland	2–0	2–1	2026–27 UEFA Nations League B

== Honours ==
FCSB

- Cupa României: 2019–20

Parma

- Serie B: 2023–24

PSV

- Eredivisie: 2025–26
- Johan Cruyff Shield runner-up: 2026

Individual

- Gazeta Sporturilor Romanian Footballer of the Year: 2020, 2024; runner-up: 2025
- Liga I Team of the Season: 2018–19
- Eredivisie Player of the Month: February 2026
