= Răzvan Ducan =

Romanian association football player

Personal information
- Full name: Răzvan Cristian Ducan
- Date of birth: 9 February 2001 (age 25)
- Place of birth: Videle, Romania
- Height: 1.92 m (6 ft 4 in)
- Position: Goalkeeper

Team information
- Current team: Rapid București
- Number: 68

Youth career
- –2017: CS Petrolul Videle
- 2018–2019: FCSB

Senior career*
Years	Team	Apps	(Gls)
2018–2023	FCSB	0	(0)
2019–2020	→ Argeș Pitești (loan)	20	(0)
2020	→ Turris Turnu Măgurele (loan)	4	(0)
2021–2022	→ Mioveni (loan)	22	(0)
2023–2024	Botoșani	41	(0)
2024–2026	Farul Constanța	0	(0)
2026	Unirea Alba Iulia	6	(0)
2026–	Rapid București	0	(0)

International career
2017	Romania U16	5	(0)
2017–2018	Romania U17	5	(0)
2018–2019	Romania U18	3	(0)
2019	Romania U19	4	(0)
2021	Romania U21	1	(0)
- * Club domestic league appearances and goals as of 23 May 2026

Răzvan Cristian Ducan (born 9 February 2001) is a Romanian professional footballer who plays as a goalkeeper for Liga I club Rapid București.

== Career statistics ==
As of match played 6 June 2026

Appearances and goals by club, season and competition
Club	Season	League			Cupa României		Europe		Other		Total	
Club	Season	Division	Apps	Goals	Apps	Goals	Apps	Goals	Apps	Goals	Apps	Goals
Argeș Pitești (loan)	2019–20	Liga II	20	0	0	0	―		―		20	0
FCSB	2020–21	Liga I	0	0	0	0	1 (Note: Appearance in UEFA Europa League)	0	0	0	1	0
FCSB	2022–23	Liga I	0	0	1	0	0	0	―		1	0
FCSB	Total		0	0	1	0	1	0	―		2	0
Turris Turnu Măgurele (loan)	2020–21	Liga II	4	0	―		―		―		4	0
Mioveni (loan)	2020–21	Liga II	1	0	―		―		1 (Note: Appearance in Liga I promotion/relegation play-offs)	0	2	0
Mioveni (loan)	2021–22	Liga I	21	0	1	0	―		―		22	0
Mioveni (loan)	Total		22	0	1	0	―		1	0	24	0
Botoșani	2022–23	Liga I	9	0	―		―		―		9	0
Botoșani	2023–24	Liga I	32	0	1	0	―		―		33	0
Botoșani	Total		41	0	1	0	―		―		42	0
Farul Constanța	2024–25	Liga I	0	0	5	0	―		―		5	0
Farul Constanța	2025–26	Liga I	0	0	0	0	―		―		0	0
Farul Constanța	Total		0	0	5	0	―		―		5	0
Unirea Alba Iulia	2025–26	Liga III	6	0	―		―		2 (Note: Appearances in Liga III promotion play-offs)	0	8	0
Rapid București	2026–27	Liga I	0	0	0	0	―		―		0	0
Career total			93	0	8	0	1	0	3	0	105	0
