= Adrian Petre =

Romanian footballer

Personal information
- Full name: Adrian Tabarcea Petre
- Date of birth: 11 February 1998 (age 28)
- Place of birth: Arad, Romania
- Height: 1.88 m (6 ft 2 in)
- Position: Striker

Team information
- Current team: Păulești
- Number: 19

Youth career
- 2010–2014: Atletico Arad
- 2014–2015: UTA Arad

Senior career*
Years	Team	Apps	(Gls)
2015–2017	UTA Arad	39	(29)
2017–2020	Esbjerg fB	75	(24)
2020–2021	FCSB	10	(1)
2020–2021	→ Cosenza (loan)	7	(0)
2021	UTA Arad	14	(0)
2021–2022	Farul Constanța	36	(11)
2022–2023	Levadiakos	5	(0)
2023–2024	Hermannstadt	3	(0)
2024	Tunari	6	(1)
2024–2025	Concordia Chiajna	14	(1)
2025–2026	Păulești	0	(0)
Total		209	(67)

International career
2015	Romania U17	3	(1)
2016	Romania U18	1	(0)
2016	Romania U19	6	(4)
2017–2021	Romania U21	18	(5)
- * Club domestic league appearances and goals as of 12 April 2025

Adrian Tabarcea Petre (born 11 February 1998) is a Romanian professional footballer who plays as a striker for Liga III club Păulești.

== Career ==
On 3 October 2020, Petre joined Italian Serie B club Cosenza on a season-long loan with an option to buy.

== Personal life ==
Petre is named Tabarcea after the former Petrolul Ploieşti player Constantin Tabarcea who died on the field while playing a match at age 26.

== Career statistics ==
As of 12 April 2025

Appearances and goals by club, season and competition
Club	Season	League			National cup (Note: Includes Danish Cup, Cupa României, Coppa Italia, Greek Cup)		Europe		Other		Total	
Club	Season	Division	Apps	Goals	Apps	Goals	Apps	Goals	Apps	Goals	Apps	Goals
UTA Arad	2015–16	Liga II	10	1	0	0	—		2	0	12	1
UTA Arad	2016–17	Liga II	29	28	0	0	—		2	1	31	29
UTA Arad	Total		39	29	0	0	—		4	1	43	30
Esbjerg	2017–18	Danish 1st Division	24	13	0	0	—		1	0	25	13
Esbjerg	2018–19	Danish Superliga	35	8	2	2	—		—		37	10
Esbjerg	2019–20	Danish Superliga	16	3	1	0	2 (Note: Appearances in UEFA Europa League)	0	—		19	3
Esbjerg	Total		75	24	3	2	2	0	1	0	81	26
FCSB	2019–20	Liga I	8	1	4	1	—		—		12	2
FCSB	2020–21	Liga I	2	0	0	0	2	1	0	0	4	1
FCSB	Total		10	1	4	1	2	1	0	0	16	3
Cosenza (loan)	2020–21	Serie B	7	0	2	0	—		—		9	0
UTA Arad	2020–21	Liga I	14	0	1	1	—		—		15	1
Farul Constanța	2021–22	Liga I	33	9	1	0	—		—		34	9
Farul Constanța	2022–23	Liga I	3	2	—		—		—		3	2
Farul Constanța	Total		36	11	1	0	—		—		37	11
Levadiakos	2022–23	Super League Greece	5	0	1	0	—		—		6	0
Hermannstadt	2023–24	Liga I	3	0	2	0	—		—		5	0
Tunari	2023–24	Liga II	6	1	—		—		—		6	1
Concordia Chiajna	2024–25	Liga II	14	1	2	0	—		—		16	1
Păulești	2025–26	Liga III	0	0	0	0	—		—		0	0
Career total			209	67	16	4	4	1	5	1	234	73

== Honours ==
FCSB

- Cupa României: 2019–20

Farul Constanța

- Liga I: 2022–23
