= Cristian Dumitru =

Romanian professional footballer

Personal information
- Full name: Cristian Cosmin Dumitru
- Date of birth: 13 December 2001 (age 24)
- Place of birth: Buzău, Romania
- Height: 1.73 m (5 ft 8 in)
- Position: Forward

Team information
- Current team: Metalul Buzău
- Number: 7

Youth career
- Galactic Buzău
- –2018: LPS Buzău
- 2018–2019: FCSB

Senior career*
Years	Team	Apps	(Gls)
2019–2023	FCSB	7	(0)
2019	→ Academica Clinceni (loan)	14	(2)
2019	→ Academica Clinceni (loan)	10	(0)
2020	→ Academica Clinceni (loan)	5	(0)
2021	→ Argeș Pitești (loan)	24	(3)
2021–2022	→ Argeș Pitești (loan)	30	(1)
2022	→ Mioveni (loan)	4	(0)
2023	Voluntari	0	(0)
2023–2025	Gloria Buzău	36	(7)
2025–2026	Metalul Buzău	7	(2)
2026	SCM Râmnicu Vâlcea	0	(0)
2026–	Metalul Buzău	2	(0)

International career
2019	Romania U18	1	(0)
2019	Romania U19	5	(0)
2021	Romania U20	3	(0)
2021	Romania U21	1	(0)
- * Club domestic league appearances and goals as of 24 October 2026

Cristian Cosmin Dumitru (born 13 December 2001) is a Romanian professional footballer who plays as a forward for Liga II club Metalul Buzău.

== Club career ==
=== FCSB ===
Cristian Dumitru made his European debut for FCSB on 11 July 2019 coming on as a substitute for Florinel Coman in a 2019–20 UEFA Europa League match against Milsami Orhei. He scored his first goal for FCSB in the 2nd leg, in the 4th minute of the game.

=== Academica Clinceni (loan) ===
On 22 July 2019, Dumitru was joined on loan for the rest of the season.

== Career statistics ==
As of match played 5 September 2026

Appearances and goals by club, season and competition
Club	Season	League			Cupa României		Europe		Other		Total	
Club	Season	Division	Apps	Goals	Apps	Goals	Apps	Goals	Apps	Goals	Apps	Goals
FCSB	2018–19	Liga I	0	0	1	1	0	0	—		1	1
FCSB	2019–20	Liga I	5	0	2	1	2 (Note: Appearances in UEFA Europa League)	1	—		9	2
FCSB	2020–21	Liga I	1	0	0	0	—		—		1	0
FCSB	2021–22	Liga I	1	0	0	0	2 (Note: Appearances in UEFA Europa Conference League)	0	0	0	3	0
FCSB	Total		7	0	3	2	4	1	0	0	14	3
Academica Clinceni (loan)	2018–19	Liga II	14	2	0	0	—		—		14	2
Academica Clinceni (loan)	2019–20	Liga I	10	0	1	0	—		—		11	0
Academica Clinceni (loan)	2020–21	Liga I	5	0	0	0	—		—		5	0
Academica Clinceni (loan)	Total		29	2	1	0	—		—		30	2
Argeș Pitești (loan)	2020–21	Liga I	24	3	—		—		—		24	3
Argeș Pitești (loan)	2021–22	Liga I	30	1	3	1	—		—		33	2
Argeș Pitești (loan)	Total		54	4	3	1	—		—		57	5
Mioveni (loan)	2022–23	Liga I	4	0	2	0	—		—		6	0
Voluntari	2022–23	Liga I	0	0	—		—		—		0	0
Gloria Buzău	2023–24	Liga II	28	7	2	0	—		—		30	7
Gloria Buzău	2024–25	Liga I	8	0	1	0	—		—		9	0
Gloria Buzău	Total		36	7	3	0	—		—		39	7
Metalul Buzău	2025–26	Liga II	7	2	2	2	—		—		9	4
SCM Râmnicu Vâlcea	2026–27	Liga II	0	0	0	0	—		—		0	0
Metalul Buzău	2026–27	Liga II	2	0	0	0	—		—		2	0
Career total			139	15	14	5	4	1	0	0	157	21

== Honours ==
FCSB

- Cupa României: 2019–20
