= 2017 Supercupa României =

- Event: 2017 Supercupa României
Viitorul Constanța	Voluntari
Liga I	Cupa României
0	1
- Date: 9 July 2017
- Venue: Municipal, Botoșani
- Man of the Match: Costin Lazăr
- Referee: Sebastian Colțescu
- Attendance: 5,532
- Weather: Clear

The 2017 Supercupa României was the 19th edition of Romania's season opener cup competition. The game was contested between Liga I title holders, Viitorul Constanța, and Romanian Cup holders, Voluntari. It was played at Municipal Stadium in Botoșani in July. Voluntari won the trophy for the first time in its history, after defeating Viitorul Constanța with 1–0.

== Match ==
=== Details ===
9 July 2017
21:00 EET (UTC+02)

Viitorul Constanța	0–1	Voluntari
	Report; Report; Report	Costin Lazăr 12'

Municipal, Botoșani
Attendance: 5,532
Referee: Sebastian Colțescu

Viitorul Constanța	Voluntari

GK	12	(Romania) Victor Rîmniceanu
RB	2	(Romania) Andrei Dumitraș		(substituted off) 46'
CB	21	(Ivory Coast) Kévin Boli	(yellow card) 81'
CB	16	(Romania) Dragoș Nedelcu		(substituted off) 71'
LB	25	(Romania) Aurelian Chițu		(substituted off) 46'
CM	15	(Romania) Bogdan Țîru (c)
DM	18	(Spain) Daniel López
CM	23	(Romania) Alexandru Cicâldău
RW	28	(Romania) Ionuț Vînă	(yellow card) 15' (yellow-red card) 32'
LW	22	(Romania) Cristian Ganea
FW	26	(Romania) Alexandru Mățan	(yellow card) 58'
Substitutes:
DF	4	(Romania) Marius Constantin
DF	5	(Romania) Sebastian Mladen
DF	6	(Romania) Romario Benzar		(substituted on) 46'
MF	8	(Romania) Carlo Casap		(substituted on) 46'
MF	10	(Romania) Ovidiu Herea	(yellow card) 74'	(substituted on) 71'
FW	20	(Romania) George Țucudean
GK	31	(Romania) Alexandru Buzbuchi
Manager:
(Romania) Gheorghe Hagi

GK	22	(Romania) Dragoș Balauru
RB	24	(Romania) Vasile Maftei (c)	(yellow card) 90+4'
CB	28	(Romania) Ionuț Balaur	(yellow card) 82'
CB	87	(Romania) Florin Acsinte	(yellow card) 68'
LB	23	(Romania) Vlad Olteanu		(substituted off) 82'
DM	18	(Romania) Mihai Popescu
DM	15	(Romania) Costin Lazăr		12'
RM	20	(Romania) Laurențiu Marinescu
CM	5	(Romania) Alexandru Răuță
LM	26	(Romania) Gabriel Deac		(substituted off) 71'
CF	90	(Romania) Adrian Bălan		(substituted off) 90'
Substitutes:
DF	4	(Romania) Mircea Leasă
MF	6	(Romania) Sorin Tăbăcariu
MF	7	(Romania) Petre Ivanovici		(substituted on) 71'
MF	11	(Romania) Mihai Căpățînă		(substituted on) 90'
GK	27	(Romania) Răzvan Petrariu
MF	59	(Romania) Doru Popadiuc
MF	96	(Romania) Adelin Pîrcălabu		(substituted on) 82'
Manager:
(Romania) Claudiu Niculescu

Man of the match

- (Romania) Costin Lazăr (Voluntari)

Match officials

- Assistant referees:
  - (Romania) Mihaela Țepusă
  - (Romania) Petruța Iugulescu
- Fourth official:
  - (Romania) George Găman
- Additional assistant referees:
  - (Romania) Bogdan Zanfirescu
  - (Romania) Bogdan Gheorghiţă

Match rules

- 90 minutes.
- Penalty shoot-out if score's still level.
- Seven named substitutes.
- Maximum of three substitutions.

== See also ==
- 2017–18 Liga I
- 2017–18 Cupa României
