= Cosmin Achim =

Romanian footballer

Personal information
- Full name: Cosmin Florin Achim
- Date of birth: 19 September 1995 (age 31)
- Place of birth: Drăgănești-Olt, Romania
- Height: 1.88 m (6 ft 2 in)
- Position: Defender

Team information
- Current team: ASA Târgu Mureș
- Number: 2

Youth career
- 2008–2013: Școala de Fotbal Gheorghe Popescu
- 2013–2014: Gheorghe Hagi Academy

Senior career*
Years	Team	Apps	(Gls)
2014–2023	Voluntari	140	(8)
2018	→ Energeticianul (loan)	7	(1)
2023	Petrolul Ploiesti	5	(0)
2024	Sport Team București		
2025	Agricola Borcea		
2025	Metaloglobus București	4	(0)
2026–	ASA Târgu Mureș	3	(0)

International career
2014	Romania U19	7	(0)
- * Club domestic league appearances and goals as of 31 October 2026

Cosmin Florin Achim (born 19 September 1995) is a Romanian professional footballer who plays as a defender for Liga II club ASA Târgu Mureș.

== Honours ==
Voluntari

- Liga II: 2014–15
- Liga III: 2013–14
- Cupa României: 2016–17
- Supercupa României: 2017
