= Adrian Niță =

Romanian association football player

Personal information
- Full name: Adrian Romeo Niță
- Date of birth: 8 March 2003 (age 23)
- Place of birth: Slatina, Romania
- Height: 1.70 m (5 ft 7 in)
- Position: Winger

Team information
- Current team: SCM Zalău
- Number: 92

Youth career
- –2017: LPS Slatina
- 2017–2019: FCSB

Senior career*
Years	Team	Apps	(Gls)
2019–2023	FCSB	9	(0)
2020	→ Turris Turnu Măgurele (loan)	14	(4)
2021	→ FCSB II	1	(0)
2021–2022	→ Unirea Constanța (loan)	33	(6)
2023–2024	CSM Slatina	?	(?)
2024	Cetatea Turnu Măgurele	?	(?)
2024–	SCM Zalău	0	(0)

International career^{‡}
2018	Romania U15	4	(0)
2019–2020	Romania U17	7	(0)
2021	Romania U18	2	(0)
2021–	Romania U19	6	(0)
- * Club domestic league appearances and goals as of 14:19, 30 October 2024 (UTC) ‡ National team caps and goals as of 7 September 2021

Adrian Romeo Niță (born 8 March 2003) is a Romanian professional footballer who plays as a winger for SCM Zalău.

== Career statistics ==
As of match played 3 December 2022

Appearances and goals by club, season and competition
Club	Season	League			Cupa României		Europe		Other		Total	
Club	Season	Division	Apps	Goals	Apps	Goals	Apps	Goals	Apps	Goals	Apps	Goals
FCSB	2019–20	Liga I	4	0	2	0	—		—		6	0
FCSB	2020–21	Liga I	5	0	1	0	—		—		6	0
FCSB	Total		9	0	3	0	—		—		12	0
Turris Turnu Măgurele (loan)	2020–21	Liga II	14	4	1	0	—		—		15	4
FCSB II	2020–21	Liga III	1	0	—		—		—		1	0
Unirea Constanța (loan)	2021–22	Liga II	20	5	—		—		—		20	5
Unirea Constanța (loan)	2022–23	Liga II	12	1	1	0	—		—		13	1
Unirea Constanța (loan)	Total		47	10	2	0	—		—		49	10
CSM Slatina	2022–23	Liga II	?	?	—		—		—		?	?
Cetatea Turnu Măgurele	2023–24	Liga III	?	?	?	?	—		—		?	?
Career total			56	10	5	0	—		—		61	10

== Honours ==
FCSB

- Cupa României: 2019–20
