= Olimpiu Moruțan =

Romanian footballer (born 1999)

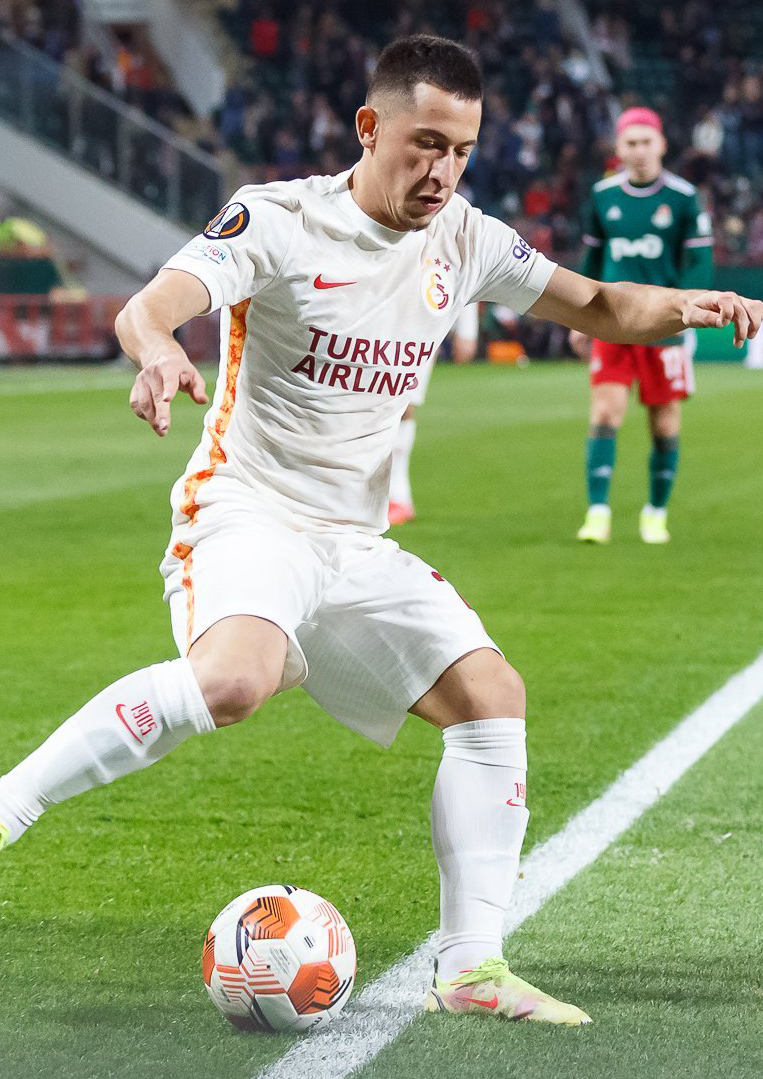
- Moruțan with Galatasaray in 2021

Personal information
- Full name: Olimpiu Vasile Moruțan
- Date of birth: 25 April 1999 (age 27)
- Place of birth: Cluj-Napoca, Romania
- Height: 1.73 m (5 ft 8 in)
- Positions: Attacking midfielder; winger

Team information
- Current team: Rapid București
- Number: 80

Youth career
- 2008–2015: Universitatea Cluj

Senior career*
Years	Team	Apps	(Gls)
2015–2016	Universitatea Cluj	15	(1)
2016–2018	Botoșani	55	(2)
2018–2021	FCSB	90	(12)
2021–2023	Galatasaray	26	(3)
2022–2023	→ Pisa (loan)	35	(6)
2023–2025	Ankaragücü	30	(2)
2024–2025	→ Pisa (loan)	10	(1)
2025–2026	Aris	13	(0)
2026–	Rapid București	33	(3)

International career^{‡}
2015–2017	Romania U17	4	(0)
2017–2018	Romania U19	10	(5)
2017–2021	Romania U21	16	(1)
2021–	Romania	20	(1)
- * Club domestic league appearances and goals as of 7 November 2026 ‡ National team caps and goals as of 14 November 2026

Olimpiu Vasile Moruțan (Romanian pronunciation: [oˈlimpju vaˈsile moruˈt͡san]; born 25 April 1999) is a Romanian professional footballer who plays as an attacking midfielder or a winger for Liga I club Rapid București and the Romania national team.

A youth exponent of Universitatea Cluj, he recorded his debut for the seniors at the start of 2016. Moruțan went on to amass over 140 appearances in the top tier for Botoșani and FCSB combined in the following seasons, before moving abroad at age 22 to sign for Galatasaray in Turkey.

Internationally, Moruțan represented Romania under-21 at the 2021 UEFA European Championship. He then made his full debut for the country in October that year, in a 1–0 victory over Armenia.

== Club career ==
=== Early career ===
Born in Cluj-Napoca and raised in Cătina, Moruțan joined the academy of Universitatea Cluj in 2008. At age 16, he played his first senior match for U Cluj in a 0–0 Liga II draw with Mioveni on 27 February 2016. On 16 April, he scored in a 1–3 away loss to Olimpia Satu Mare.

Moruțan moved to Botoșani in August 2016, making his Liga I debut on 15 October by coming on as a 74th-minute substitute in a 1–2 defeat at Pandurii Târgu Jiu. During early 2017, it was reported that FCSB, Atalanta and PSV Eindhoven were interested in acquiring him. Moruțan scored his first goal for the club—and in the top division—on 25 September 2017, in a 1–0 win over defending champions Viitorul Constanța.

=== FCSB ===
On 21 December 2017, FCSB agreed a deal in advance for the signing of Moruțan on a five-year contract from the start of the 2018–19 season. They reportedly paid a €700,000 transfer fee, while Botoșani retained 20% interest.

Moruțan made his debut on 21 July 2018, in a 0–1 Liga I defeat to Astra Giurgiu. Four days later, he played in his first European game, a 2–0 away success over Rudar Velenje in the UEFA Europa League second qualifying round. In the second leg in Bucharest on 2 August, he netted a goal after dribbling past several opponents and offered an assist as his team won 4–0, which earned him praise from owner George Becali. His first league goal came on 5 August, scoring the last in a 4–0 home win over Politehnica Iași. On 28 September, it was revealed that FCSB in truth paid €1 million for the player and that it recently acquired another 10% of the economic rights for €400,000.

Moruțan amassed 34 games in all competitions during his first year with the capital-based club, but started the majority of them on the bench. In the 2019–20 campaign he had poorer performances, which led Becali to criticise him heavily in the media. During mid-2020, Moruțan began to cement his place in the starting lineup, and in October scored one each in the successive 2–0 and 5–0 wins over Academica Clinceni and Hermannstadt, respectively.

On 13 March 2021, his headed goal helped to a 1–0 away defeat of UTA Arad, and six days later he netted in a 3–0 victory against title contenders CFR Cluj. FCSB ultimately lost the title as well as the postponed 2020 Supercupa României to the latter opponent, but Moruțan rose to prominence individually after totalling eight goals and eleven assists in the league. After an unsuccessful start to the 2021–22 season, the team dismissed its coach and he was again among the players targeted by the owner's criticism.

=== Galatasaray ===
On 23 August 2021, following protracted negotiations, the owner of FCSB announced that he accepted an offer worth €4.2 million plus €1.5 million in bonuses from Galatasaray for the transfer of Moruțan. Two days later, the Turkish club officially confirmed the signing of a five-year contract, but only reported a €3.5 million fee without mentioning add-ons.

Moruțan made his debut on the 29th that month in a 2–2 Süper Lig draw at Kasımpaşa, in which he assisted the opener of compatriot Alexandru Cicâldău and contributed to the second goal. On 26 September, he scored in a 2–1 success over Göztepe, and on 22 October provided an assist in a 1–0 victory over Lokomotiv Moscow in the Europa League group stage.

==== Loan to Pisa ====
On 4 August 2022, Serie B team Pisa paid €150,000 to loan Moruțan for one season. The Italian side had the option to sign him permanently for €5.5 million, and the full transfer would have become mandatory depending on performance clauses. Moruțan made his league debut on 13 August, providing two assists in a 3–4 loss to Cittadella, and the following fixture converted a penalty in a 2–2 draw with Como.

=== Ankaragücü ===
On 20 August 2023, Moruțan signed a three-year contract with the option of another year with fellow Süper Lig team Ankaragücü for an initial €3 million transfer fee. Galatasaray retained 50% interest on a possible future sale, but not less than another €3 million, and the percentage would be halved in case the specified fee is paid before the end of the season. The contract also included a €3 million buyback clause.

== International career ==
=== Youth ===
Moruțan was selected by head coach Adrian Mutu for the 2021 UEFA European Under-21 Championship, playing in all three matches against the Netherlands, Hungary, and Germany. He started in the 1–1 draw and the 2–1 victory against the former two, respectively, and entered the field in the second half of the goalless draw with the latter as Romania finished third in its group.

=== Senior ===
Moruțan earned his first cap for the full side on 11 October 2021, coming on for goal scorer Alexandru Mitriță in a 1–0 success over Armenia in the 2022 FIFA World Cup qualifiers. He scored his first goal for the nation by opening the scoring in a 5–0 friendly win over Moldova, on 20 November 2022.

The following year, Moruțan contributed with nine appearances in the Euro 2024 qualifiers, of which four as a starter, as Romania won its group undefeated.

== Style of play ==
Moruțan is capable of playing in several advanced midfield positions, and during his time at Botoșani was regarded by former international Dan Petrescu as Romania's future number 10.

== Career statistics ==
=== Club ===
As of match played 7 November 2026

Appearances and goals by club, season and competition
Club	Season	League			National cup (Note: Includes Cupa României, Turkish Cup, Coppa Italia, Greek Cup)		Europe		Other		Total	
Club	Season	Division	Apps	Goals	Apps	Goals	Apps	Goals	Apps	Goals	Apps	Goals
Universitatea Cluj	2015–16	Liga II	15	1	0	0	—		—		15	1
Botoșani	2016–17	Liga I	19	0	0	0	—		—		19	0
Botoșani	2017–18	Liga I	36	2	4	0	—		—		40	2
Botoșani	Total		55	2	4	0	—		—		59	2
FCSB	2018–19	Liga I	27	2	2	0	5 (Note: Appearances in UEFA Europa League)	1	—		34	3
FCSB	2019–20	Liga I	25	1	5	1	0	0	—		30	2
FCSB	2020–21	Liga I	33	8	0	0	2	0	1 (Note: Appearance in Supercupa României)	0	36	8
FCSB	2021–22	Liga I	5	1	0	0	2 (Note: Appearances in UEFA Europa Conference League)	0	0	0	7	1
FCSB	Total		90	12	7	1	9	1	1	0	107	14
Galatasaray	2021–22	Süper Lig	26	3	1	0	7	0	—		34	3
Galatasaray	2023–24	Süper Lig	—		—		2 (Note: Appearances in UEFA Champions League)	0	—		2	0
Galatasaray	Total		26	3	1	0	9	0	—		36	3
Pisa (loan)	2022–23	Serie B	35	6	1	0	—		—		36	6
Ankaragücü	2023–24	Süper Lig	30	2	5	2	—		—		35	4
Pisa (loan)	2024–25	Serie B	10	1	0	0	—		—		10	1
Aris	2025–26	Super League Greece	13	0	2	0	2	0	—		17	0
Rapid București	2025–26	Liga I	18	1	1	0	—		—		19	1
Rapid București	2026–27	Liga I	15	2	2	0	—		—		17	2
Rapid București	Total		33	3	3	0	—		—		36	3
Career total			307	30	23	3	20	1	1	0	351	34

=== International ===
As of match played 14 November 2026

Appearances and goals by national team and year
National team	Year	Apps	Goals
Romania
Romania	2021	3	0
Romania	2022	2	1
Romania	2023	9	0
Romania	2024	1	0
Romania	2025	2	0
Romania	2026	3	0
Total		20	1

Scores and results list Romania's goal tally first, score column indicates score after each Moruțan goal.

List of international goals scored by Olimpiu Moruțan
No.	Date	Venue	Opponent	Score	Result	Competition
1	20 November 2022	Zimbru Stadium, Chișinău, Moldova	Moldova	1–0	5–0	Friendly

== Honours ==
FCSB

- Cupa României: 2019–20
- Supercupa României runner-up: 2020

Individual

- Liga I Team of the Season: 2020–21
- Liga I Top Assist Provider: 2020–21
