= Ronaldo Deaconu =

Romanian footballer (born 1997)

Personal information
- Full name: Octavian Ronaldo Andrei Deaconu
- Date of birth: 13 May 1997 (age 29)
- Place of birth: Bucharest, Romania
- Height: 1.81 m (5 ft 11 in)
- Positions: Attacking midfielder; winger

Team information
- Current team: Corvinul Hunedoara
- Number: 70

Youth career
- 2004–2009: Steaua București
- 2009–2011: Gheorghe Hagi Academy
- 2011–2012: Feyenoord
- 2012–2015: Twente

Senior career*
Years	Team	Apps	(Gls)
2016–2017	ASA Târgu Mureș	9	(0)
2017–2019	Concordia Chiajna	55	(3)
2019	HNK Gorica	5	(0)
2019–2020	Sepsi OSK	22	(1)
2020–2022	Gaz Metan Mediaș	55	(12)
2022	Shaanxi Chang'an Athletic	6	(2)
2022–2024	Korona Kielce	44	(5)
2024	Farul Constanța	12	(2)
2024–2025	Hermannstadt	13	(2)
2025	Nyíregyháza	5	(0)
2025–2026	Unirea Slobozia	12	(0)
2026–	Corvinul Hunedoara	17	(0)

International career
2013	Romania U16	2	(1)
2013–2014	Romania U17	3	(0)
2021	Romania Olympic	2	(0)
- * Club domestic league appearances and goals as of 13 September 2026

Octavian Ronaldo Andrei Deaconu (born 13 May 1997) is a Romanian professional footballer who plays as an attacking midfielder or a winger for Liga I club Corvinul Hunedoara.

== Club career ==
Deaconu started his professional career with ASA Târgu Mureș in 2016, after having previously played as a junior for FC Steaua București, the Gheorghe Hagi Academy, and Dutch clubs Feyenoord and Twente, respectively. He made his senior debut for Târgu Mureș on 5 August 2016, aged 19, in a 0–3 Liga I loss to Politehnica Iași.

During the winter transfer window of 2017, Deaconu moved to fellow league team Concordia Chiajna. He totalled three goals from 55 Liga I matches, before transferring abroad to HNK Gorica on 1 February 2019.

He appeared sparingly during his spell in Croatia, and in the summer of that year returned to his country after Sepsi OSK acquired him for €100,000. On 22 July 2020, he played the full 90 minutes as his side lost 0–1 to FCSB in the Cupa României final.

On 26 August 2020, Deaconu signed a two-year deal with Gaz Metan Mediaș as a free agent. In the 2020–21 season, he amassed 39 games and eleven goals in all competitions. On 15 October 2021, he scored two long-range goals in the span of two minutes to secure a 2–1 home win over Dinamo București.

Following a short stint with China League One club Shaanxi Chang'an Athletic, on 28 July 2022 Deaconu joined Polish side Korona Kielce on a two-year contract. On 8 January 2024, he left the club by mutual consent.

== International career ==
Deaconu was called up by the Romania under-23 team to the postponed 2020 Summer Olympics, appearing once in a goalless draw with New Zealand which led to a group-stage exit.

== Personal life ==
Deaconu's father is a football fan, and named his son after Brazilian international Ronaldo.

== Career statistics ==
As of match played 13 September 2026

Appearances and goals by club, season and competition
Club	Season	League			National cup (Note: Includes Cupa României, Polish Cup, Magyar Kupa)		League cup (Note: Includes Cupa Ligii)		Continental		Other		Total	
Club	Season	Division	Apps	Goals	Apps	Goals	Apps	Goals	Apps	Goals	Apps	Goals	Apps	Goals
ASA Târgu Mureș	2016–17	Liga I	9	0	2	1	1	0	—		—		12	1
Concordia Chiajna	2016–17	Liga I	7	0	—		—		—		—		7	0
Concordia Chiajna	2017–18	Liga I	32	3	1	0	—		—		—		33	3
Concordia Chiajna	2018–19	Liga I	16	0	1	0	—		—		—		17	0
Concordia Chiajna	Total		55	3	2	0	—		—		—		57	3
HNK Gorica	2018–19	Prva HNL	5	0	—		—		—		—		5	0
Sepsi OSK	2019–20	Liga I	22	1	4	0	—		—		—		26	1
Gaz Metan Mediaș	2020–21	Liga I	37	9	2	2	—		—		—		39	11
Gaz Metan Mediaș	2021–22	Liga I	18	3	2	0	—		—		—		20	3
Gaz Metan Mediaș	Total		55	12	4	2	—		—		—		59	14
Shaanxi Chang'an Athletic	2022	China League One	6	2	—		—		—		—		6	2
Korona Kielce	2022–23	Ekstraklasa	27	2	1	0	—		—		—		28	2
Korona Kielce	2023–24	Ekstraklasa	17	3	3	1	—		—		—		20	4
Korona Kielce	Total		44	5	4	1	—		—		—		48	6
Farul Constanța	2023–24	Liga I	12	2	—		—		—		—		12	2
Hermannstadt	2024–25	Liga I	13	2	3	1	—		—		—		16	3
Nyíregyháza	2024–25	Nemzeti Bajnokság I	5	0	1	0	—		—		—		6	0
Unirea Slobozia	2025–26	Liga I	12	0	1	0	—		—		—		13	0
Corvinul Hunedoara	2025–26	Liga II	13	0	—		—		—		—		13	0
Corvinul Hunedoara	2026–27	Liga I	4	0	2	0	—		—		—		6	0
Corvinul Hunedoara	Total		17	0	2	0	—		—		—		19	0
Career total			255	27	23	5	1	0	0	0	0	0	279	32

== Honours ==
Sepsi OSK

- Cupa României runner-up: 2019–20

Corvinul Hunedoara

- Liga II: 2025–26
