= Andrei Istrate =

Romanian footballer

Personal information
- Full name: Andrei Gabriel Istrate
- Date of birth: 15 March 2002 (age 24)
- Place of birth: Hațeg, Romania
- Height: 1.88 m (6 ft 2 in)
- Position: Forward

Team information
- Current team: Unirea Dej

Youth career
- –2020: Ardealul Cluj-Napoca
- 2020–2021: FCSB

Senior career*
Years	Team	Apps	(Gls)
2020–2023	FCSB	10	(1)
2021–2022	→ Politehnica Iași (loan)	8	(1)
2022–2023	→ Viitorul Târgu Jiu (loan)	6	(0)
2023	Jiul Petroșani		
2024–2025	Jiul Petroșani		
2025	Gloria Ultra		
2025–	Unirea Dej		

International career
2019	Romania U18	1	(0)
2021	Romania U20	1	(0)
- * Club domestic league appearances and goals as of 11:10, 8 December 2024 (UTC)

Andrei Gabriel Istrate (born 15 March 2002) is a Romanian professional footballer who plays as a forward for Liga III club Unirea Dej.

== Career statistics ==
As of match played 3 December 2022

Appearances and goals by club, season and competition
Club	Season	League			Cupa României		Europe		Other		Total	
Club	Season	Division	Apps	Goals	Apps	Goals	Apps	Goals	Apps	Goals	Apps	Goals
FCSB	2019–20	Liga I	2	0	0	0	0	0	0	0	2	0
FCSB	2020–21	Liga I	8	1	0	0	0	0	1 (Note: Appearance in Supercupa României)	0	9	1
FCSB	Total		10	1	3	2	4	1	0	0	11	1
Politehnica Iași (loan)	2021–22	Liga II	8	1	0	0	—		0	0	8	1
Viitorul Târgu Jiu (loan)	2022–23	Liga II	6	0	0	0	—		0	0	6	0
Career total			24	2	0	0	0	0	1	0	25	2
