= Andrei Miron =

Romanian footballer (born 1994)

Personal information
- Full name: Andrei George Miron
- Date of birth: 28 May 1994 (age 32)
- Place of birth: Galați, Romania
- Height: 1.85 m (6 ft 1 in)
- Position: Centre-back

Team information
- Current team: Botoșani
- Number: 4

Youth career
- 2005–2013: Oțelul Galați

Senior career*
Years	Team	Apps	(Gls)
2014–2015	Oțelul Galați	22	(1)
2015–2020	Botoșani	150	(7)
2020–2022	FCSB	63	(2)
2022	Hapoel Haifa	5	(0)
2022–2024	Universitatea Cluj	25	(1)
2024–	Botoșani	98	(2)

International career
2015–2016	Romania U21	9	(1)
- * Club domestic league appearances and goals as of 23 October 2026

Andrei George Miron (born 28 May 1994) is a Romanian professional footballer who plays as a centre-back for Liga I club Botoșani, which he captains.

== Career statistics ==
As of match played 27 October 2026

Appearances and goals by club, season and competition
Club	Season	League			National cup (Note: Includes Cupa României)		League cup (Note: Includes Cupa Ligii, Toto Cup)		Europe		Other		Total	
Club	Season	Division	Apps	Goals	Apps	Goals	Apps	Goals	Apps	Goals	Apps	Goals	Apps	Goals
Oțelul Galați	2014–15	Liga I	22	1	1	0	0	0	—		—		23	1
Botoșani	2015–16	Liga I	26	0	2	0	1	0	1 (Note: Appearance in UEFA Europa League)	0	—		30	0
Botoșani	2016–17	Liga I	31	1	0	0	1	0	—		—		32	1
Botoșani	2017–18	Liga I	36	2	4	0	—		—		—		40	2
Botoșani	2018–19	Liga I	36	2	1	0	—		—		—		37	2
Botoșani	2019–20	Liga I	21	2	0	0	—		—		—		21	2
Botoșani	Total		150	7	7	0	2	0	1	0	—		160	7
FCSB	2019–20	Liga I	9	1	4	0	—		—		—		13	1
FCSB	2020–21	Liga I	32	0	0	0	—		1	0	0	0	33	0
FCSB	2021–22	Liga I	22	1	1	0	—		0	0	—		23	1
FCSB	Total		63	2	5	0	—		1	0	0	0	69	2
Hapoel Haifa	2022–23	Israeli Premier League	5	0	0	0	4	0	—		—		9	0
Universitatea Cluj	2022–23	Liga I	14	0	2	0	—		—		—		16	0
Universitatea Cluj	2023–24	Liga I	11	1	2	0	—		—		—		13	1
Universitatea Cluj	Total		25	1	4	0	—		—		—		29	1
Botoșani	2023–24	Liga I	15	1	—		—		—		2 (Note: Appearances in Liga I promotion/relegation play-offs)	0	17	1
Botoșani	2024–25	Liga I	32	0	2	0	—		—		—		34	0
Botoșani	2025–26	Liga I	38	1	0	0	—		—		1 (Note: Appearances in Liga I European play-offs)	0	39	1
Botoșani	2026–27	Liga I	13	0	1	0	—		—		—		14	0
Botoșani	Total		98	2	3	0	—		—		3	0	104	2
Career total			363	13	20	0	6	0	2	0	3	0	394	13

== Honours ==
FCSB

- Cupa României: 2019–20
- Supercupa României runner-up: 2020

Universitatea Cluj

- Cupa României runner-up: 2022–23
