= Ionuț Vînă =

Romanian footballer

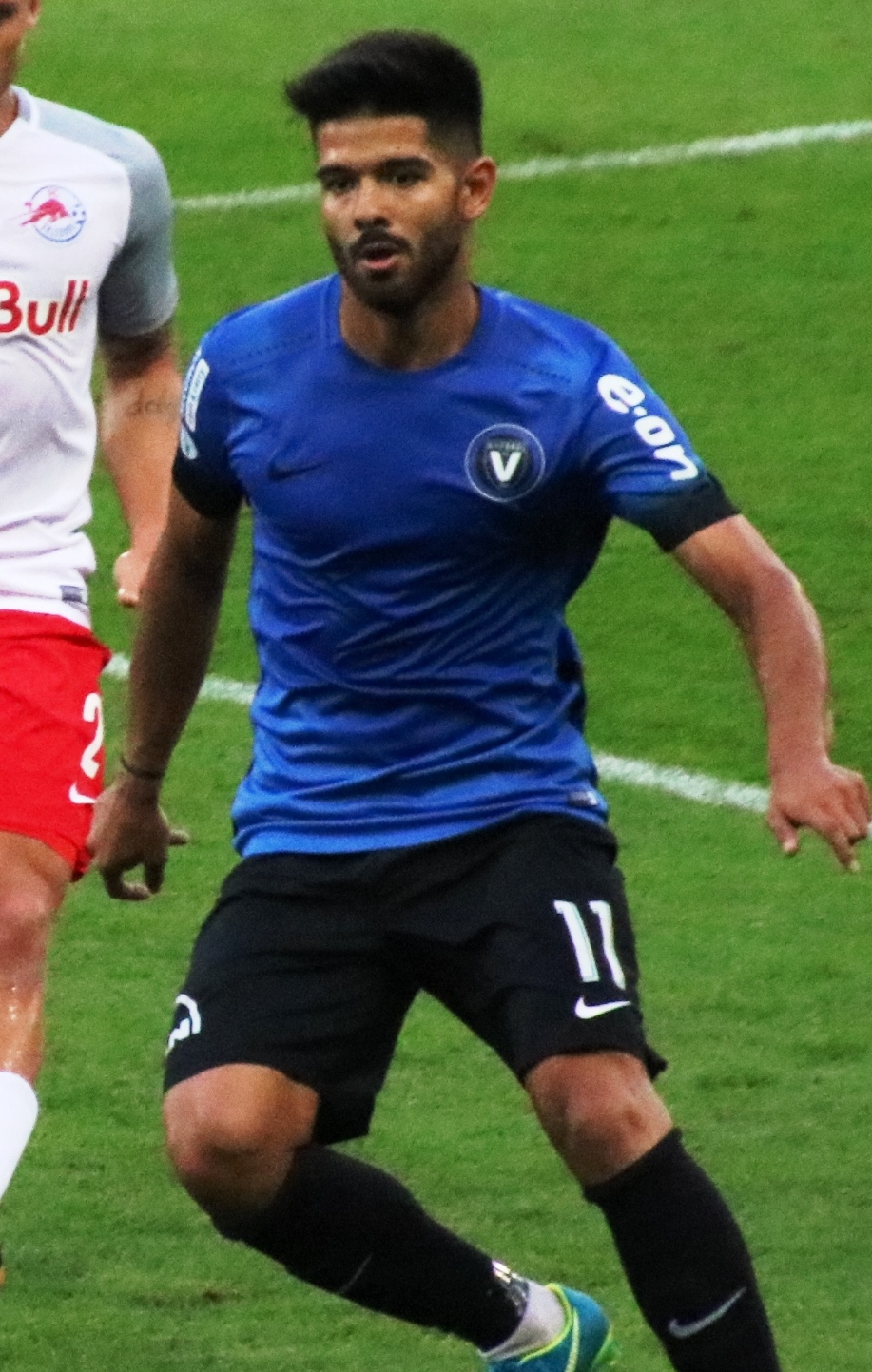
- Vînă with Viitorul Constanța in 2017

Personal information
- Full name: Ionuț Daniel Vînă
- Date of birth: 20 February 1995 (age 31)
- Place of birth: Galați, Romania
- Height: 1.79 m (5 ft 10 in)
- Position: Midfielder

Team information
- Current team: Farul Constanța
- Number: 8

Youth career
- 2009–2011: Gheorghe Hagi Academy
- 2013–2014: → Roma (loan)

Senior career*
Years	Team	Apps	(Gls)
2011–2019	Viitorul Constanța	87	(5)
2016	→ Dunărea Călărași (loan)	2	(0)
2019–2021	FCSB	48	(2)
2021–2023	Universitatea Craiova	24	(2)
2023–	Farul Constanța	106	(12)

International career
2011	Romania U17	3	(0)
2012	Romania U18	1	(0)
2013–2014	Romania U19	15	(4)
- * Club domestic league appearances and goals as of 7 November 2026

Ionuț Daniel Vînă (born 20 February 1995) is a Romanian professional footballer who plays as a midfielder for Liga I club Farul Constanța.

== Club career ==
Vînă registered his senior debut for Viitorul Constanța on 28 May 2011, aged 16, after starting in a 1–1 second division draw with Delta Tulcea. His first game in the Liga I for the team came on 30 September 2012, when he was brought on as an 87th-minute substitute for Nicolae Dică in a 1–2 loss to Rapid București.

On 11 July 2019, Vînă transferred to fellow league side FCSB for an undisclosed fee. He failed to impose himself as a starter in Bucharest, and on 31 July 2021 joined Universitatea Craiova in a swap deal which took Andrei Burlacu and Ivan Mamut in the opposite direction.

== Career statistics ==
As of 7 November 2026

Appearances and goals by club, season and competition
Club	Season	League			Cupa României		Cupa Ligii		Europe		Other		Total	
Club	Season	Division	Apps	Goals	Apps	Goals	Apps	Goals	Apps	Goals	Apps	Goals	Apps	Goals
Viitorul Constanța	2010–11	Liga II	1	0	0	0	—		—		—		1	0
Viitorul Constanța	2011–12	Liga II	1	0	1	0	—		—		—		2	0
Viitorul Constanța	2012–13	Liga I	4	0	1	0	—		—		—		5	0
Viitorul Constanța	2013–14	Liga I	4	0	—		—		—		—		4	0
Viitorul Constanța	2014–15	Liga I	5	0	2	0	1	0	—		—		8	0
Viitorul Constanța	2016–17	Liga I	15	0	3	2	0	0	0	0	—		18	2
Viitorul Constanța	2017–18	Liga I	27	3	1	1	—		3 (Note: One appearance in UEFA Champions League, two appearances in UEFA Europa League)	0	1 (Note: Appearance in Supercupa României)	0	32	4
Viitorul Constanța	2018–19	Liga I	30	2	3	0	—		4 (Note: Appearance(s) in UEFA Europa League)	0	0	0	37	2
Viitorul Constanța	2019–20	Liga I	0	0	0	0	—		0	0	1	0	1	0
Viitorul Constanța	Total		87	5	11	3	1	0	7	0	2	0	108	8
Dunărea Călărași (loan)	2015–16	Liga I	2	0	0	0	—		—		—		2	0
FCSB	2019–20	Liga I	23	1	6	0	—		6	0	—		35	1
FCSB	2020–21	Liga I	25	1	0	0	—		1	0	1	0	27	1
FCSB	2021–22	Liga I	0	0	0	0	—		1 (Note: Appearance in UEFA Europa Conference League)	0	0	0	1	0
FCSB	Total		48	2	6	0	—		8	0	1	0	63	2
Universitatea Craiova	2021–22	Liga I	19	2	3	0	—		—		—		22	2
Universitatea Craiova	2022–23	Liga I	5	0	1	0	—		0	0	—		6	0
Universitatea Craiova	Total		24	2	4	0	—		0	0	0	0	28	2
Farul Constanța	2023–24	Liga I	33	2	1	0	—		3 (Note: One appearance in UEFA Champions League, two appearances in UEFA Europa Conference League)	0	1	0	38	2
Farul Constanța	2024–25	Liga I	33	3	3	0	—		—		—		36	3
Farul Constanța	2025–26	Liga I	33	7	1	0	—		—		2 (Note: Appearances in Liga I promotion/relegation play-offs)	0	36	7
Farul Constanța	2026–27	Liga I	7	0	0	0	—		—		—		7	0
Farul Constanța	Total		106	12	5	0	—		3	0	3	0	117	12
Career total			267	21	26	3	1	0	18	0	6	0	318	24

== Honours ==
Viitorul Constanța

- Liga I: 2016–17
- Cupa României: 2018–19
- Supercupa României: 2019; runner-up: 2017

FCSB

- Cupa României: 2019–20
- Supercupa României runner-up: 2020

Farul Constanța

- Supercupa României runner-up: 2023
