= Răzvan Petrariu =

Romanian footballer

Personal information
- Full name: Răzvan Gabriel Petrariu
- Date of birth: 27 March 1995 (age 31)
- Place of birth: Bacău, Romania
- Height: 1.84 m (6 ft 0 in)
- Position: Goalkeeper

Youth career
- FCM Bacău

Senior career*
Years	Team	Apps	(Gls)
2010–2011	FCM Bacău		
2011–2012	Moinești		
2013–2015	SC Bacău	48	(0)
2015–2019	Voluntari	9	(0)
2015–2019	→ Voluntari II		
Total		57+	(0)

International career^{‡}
2012–2014	Romania U-19	1	(0)
- * Club domestic league appearances and goals as of 10 July 2019 ‡ National team caps and goals as of 10 July 2019

Răzvan Gabriel Petrariu (born 27 March 1995) is a Romanian former professional footballer who played as a goalkeeper for teams such as FCM Bacău, SC Bacău or FC Voluntari.
