= Victor Rîmniceanu =

Romanian footballer

Personal information
- Full name: Victor Teodor Rîmniceanu
- Date of birth: 11 April 1990 (age 36)
- Place of birth: Bucharest, Romania
- Height: 1.84 m (6 ft 1/2 in)
- Position: Goalkeeper

Team information
- Current team: Tunari

Youth career
- –2007: FC București
- 2007–2008: CSM Râmnicu Vâlcea

Senior career*
Years	Team	Apps	(Gls)
2008–2009	CSM Râmnicu Vâlcea	15	(0)
2009–2010	Gaz Metan CFR Craiova	18	(0)
2010–2011	Petrolul Ploiești	4	(0)
2011–2012	Otopeni	21	(0)
2012–2013	Dinamo II București	15	(0)
2013–2015	Concordia Chiajna	46	(0)
2015	Viitorul Constanța	16	(0)
2016	Dinamo București	0	(0)
2016–2017	Viitorul Constanța	46	(0)
2018	Sepsi OSK	6	(0)
2019	Concordia Chiajna	13	(0)
2019–2024	Voluntari	51	(0)
2024	Tunari	0	(0)
Total		251	(0)
- * Club domestic league appearances and goals as of 16 April 2024

Victor Teodor Rîmniceanu (born 11 April 1990) is a Romanian professional footballer who plays as a goalkeeper for Liga III club CS Tunari.

== Career ==
He made his debut in Liga I for Concordia Chiajna in a 1–0 win against Corona Braşov. In January 2016, he signed a contract with Dinamo București.

== Honours ==
=== Club ===
Viitorul Constanța

- Liga I: 2016–17
- Supercupa României runner-up: 2017

FC Voluntari

- Cupa României runner-up: 2021–22
