= 2020–21 Liga I =

103rd season of top-tier football league in Romania

Liga I
- Season: 2020–21
- Dates: 21 August 2020 – 27 May 2021
- Champions: CFR Cluj
- Relegated: Hermannstadt; Astra Giurgiu; Politehnica Iași
- Champions League: CFR Cluj
- Europa Conference League: FCSB; Universitatea Craiova; Sepsi Sfântu Gheorghe
- Matches: 256
- Goals: 570 (2.23 per match)
- Top goalscorer: Florin Tănase (24 goals)
- Best goalkeeper: Mirko Pigliacelli (16 clean sheets)
- Biggest home win: FCSB 5–0 Hermannstadt (26 October 2020)
- Biggest away win: UTA Arad 0–6 Astra Giurgiu (21 December 2020)
- Highest scoring: Politehnica Iași 5–2 FCSB (27 September 2020); Academica Clinceni 4-3 Botoșani (14 May 2021)
- Longest winning run: 7 matches FCSB; Universitatea Craiova
- Longest unbeaten run: 11 matches Argeș Pitești
- Longest winless run: 13 matches Dinamo București
- Longest losing run: 5 matches Politehnica Iași; Dinamo București; Gaz Metan Mediaș
- Highest attendance: 0 (behind closed doors)
- Lowest attendance: 0 (behind closed doors)
- Total attendance: 0 (behind closed doors)
- Average attendance: 0 (behind closed doors)
- All statistics correct as of 19 May 2021.

The 2020–21 Liga I (also known as Casa Liga 1 for sponsorship reasons) was the 103rd season of the Liga I, the top professional league for Romanian association football clubs. The season started on 21 August 2020 and ended on 19 May 2021. CFR Cluj were winners and three-time defending champions. It was the sixth season to take place in the play-off/play-out format, and the first since the 2005–06 season to feature 16 teams.

The play-off/play-out rule was also altered, with the first six teams at the regular season qualified for the play-off tournament and the last ten for the play-out. The first six teams played two matches against each other as before, but in the play-out the teams only played once against each other. At the end of the play-out, the first two places (or the 7th and 8th overall) played a single match on the ground of the lower ranked team, and the subsequent winner played the last team ranked on a UEFA Europa Conference League spot in the play-off. The winner of the latter encounter qualified for the Europa Conference League.

The teams ranked 15th and 16th at the end of the play-out tournament were directly relegated, while the 13th and 14th places played a promotion/relegation play-off against 3rd and 4th places from Liga II.

== Teams ==
The league consists of 16 teams: 13 from the 2019–20 Liga I, two teams from the 2019–20 Liga II, and the winner of the 2019–20 promotion/relegation play-off.

Teams promoted to the Liga I

The first club to be promoted was UTA Arad, following their 1–1 draw against FC Argeș on 2 August 2020. UTA returned in the Liga I after 12 years of absence.

The second club to be promoted was FC Argeș, following their 1–1 draw against UTA Arad on 2 August 2020. FC Argeș returned in the Liga I after 11 years of absence.

Teams relegated to the Liga II

No teams were relegated from the 2019–20 Liga I.

Initially, two clubs would have been relegated at the end of the 2019–20 Liga I season, with a third playing a relegation play-off with the 3rd-placed team from the 2019–20 Liga II. The first club to have been relegated would have been Chindia Târgoviște, following a 0–1 defeat on 2 August 2020 against Politehnica Iași, ending their 1-year stay in the top flight. However, owing to the effects of the COVID-19 pandemic on the previous season, the league table was frozen on 6 August 2020 and no teams were directly relegated. Instead, Chindia Târgoviște played a promotion/relegation play-off against CS Mioveni and kept their Liga I spot after a 3–1 aggregate result.

=== Venues ===
FCSB	Universitatea Craiova	CFR Cluj	Dinamo București
Arena Națională	Ion Oblemenco	Dr. Constantin Rădulescu	Dinamo
Capacity: 55,634	Capacity: 30,929	Capacity: 23,500	Capacity: 15,032
FC Argeș	UTA Arad	Chindia Târgoviște	Politehnica Iași
Nicolae Dobrin	Francisc von Neuman	Municipal (Note: Chindia Târgoviște was relocated to Ilie Oană Stadium in Ploiești and Municipal Stadium in Buzău, because Eugen Popescu Stadium in Târgoviște is under renovations.)	Emil Alexandrescu
Capacity: 15,000	Capacity: 12,700	Capacity: 12,000	Capacity: 11,390
Astra Giurgiu	2020–21 Liga I (Romania)		Gaz Metan Mediaș
Marin Anastasovici	2020–21 Liga I (Romania)		Gaz Metan
Capacity: 8,500	2020–21 Liga I (Romania)		Capacity: 7,814
FC Botoșani	2020–21 Liga I (Romania)		Sepsi OSK Sfântu Gheorghe
Municipal	2020–21 Liga I (Romania)		Municipal
Capacity: 7,782	2020–21 Liga I (Romania)		Capacity: 5,200
Hermannstadt Sibiu	Voluntari	Viitorul Constanța	Academica Clinceni
Gaz Metan (Note: FC Hermannstadt was relocated to Gaz Metan in Mediaș, because Municipal Stadium in Sibiu is under renovations.)	Anghel Iordănescu	Viitorul	Clinceni
Capacity: 7,814	Capacity: 4,600	Capacity: 4,554	Capacity: 4,500

=== Personnel and kits ===
Note: Flags indicate national team as has been defined under FIFA eligibility rules. Players and Managers may hold more than one non-FIFA nationality.

Team	Manager	Captain	Kit manufacturer	Shirt sponsor
Academica Clinceni	(Romania) Ilie Poenaru	(Romania) Răzvan Patriche	Joma	Nicmar Prima Service
Argeș Pitești	(Romania) Andrei Prepeliță	(Romania) Ionuț Șerban	Macron	Primăria Pitești, Getica 95
Astra Giurgiu	(Romania) Ionuț Badea	(Romania) Valerică Găman	Joma	Tinmar Energy
Botoșani	(Romania) Marius Croitoru	(Argentina) Jonathan Rodríguez	Erreà	Elsaco
CFR Cluj	(Romania) Edward Iordănescu	(Romania) Mário Camora	Nike	NTT Data
Chindia Târgoviște	(Romania) Emil Săndoi	(Romania) Daniel Florea	Joma	Consiliul Județean Dâmbovița
Dinamo București	(Czech Republic) Dušan Uhrin Jr.	(Croatia) Ante Puljić	Macron	Unibet
FCSB	(Romania) Anton Petrea	(Romania) Florin Tănase	Nike	City Insurance
Gaz Metan Mediaș	(Romania) Mihai Teja	(Romania) Răzvan Pleșca	Joma	Romgaz
Hermannstadt	(Romania) Eugen Beza	(Romania) Răzvan Dâlbea	Joma	ro:Superbet, Natur House
Politehnica Iași	(Italy) Nicolò Napoli	(Romania) Andrei Cristea	Joma	Superbet
Sepsi OSK	(Romania) Leontin Grozavu	(Algeria) Rachid Bouhenna	Adidas	Diószegi, Gyermelyi
Universitatea Craiova	(Greece) Marinos Ouzounidis	(Romania) Nicușor Bancu	Puma	Betano
UTA Arad	(Romania) László Balint	(Romania) Ciprian Rus	Saller	Efbet, International Alexander Holding
Viitorul Constanța	(Romania) Cătălin Anghel	(Romania) Romario Benzar	Nike	OMV Petrom
Voluntari	(Romania) Liviu Ciobotariu	(Romania) Cosmin Achim	Macron	-

=== Managerial changes ===
Team	Outgoing manager	Manner of departure	Date of vacancy	Position in table	Incoming manager	Date of appointment
Politehnica Iași	(Romania) Mircea Rednic	End of contract	7 August 2020	Pre-season	(Romania) Daniel Pancu	11 August 2020
Viitorul Constanța	(Romania) Gheorghe Hagi	Mutual agreement	7 August 2020	Pre-season	(Spain) Rubén de la Barrera	7 August 2020
Dinamo București	(Romania) Gheorghe Mulțescu	Mutual agreement	26 August 2020	7	(Romania) Cosmin Contra	26 August 2020
Gaz Metan Mediaș	(Czech Republic) Dušan Uhrin Jr.	Sacked	24 September 2020	6	(Portugal) Jorge Costa	30 September 2020
Universitatea Craiova	(Italy) Cristiano Bergodi	Sacked	7 November 2020	1	(Romania) Corneliu Papură	13 November 2020
Viitorul Constanța	(Spain) Rubén de la Barrera	Sacked	30 November 2020	7	(Romania) Mircea Rednic	2 December 2020
CFR Cluj	(Romania) Dan Petrescu	Sacked	30 November 2020	3	(Romania) Edward Iordănescu	3 December 2020
Dinamo București	(Romania) Cosmin Contra	Mutual Agreement	3 December 2020	12	(Romania) Ionel Gane	4 December 2020
Argeș Pitești	(Romania) Ionuț Moșteanu	Sacked	12 December 2020	16	(Romania) Andrei Prepeliță	13 December 2020
Voluntari	(Romania) Mihai Teja	Sacked	28 December 2020	13	(Romania) Bogdan Andone	29 December 2020
Hermannstadt	(Spain) Rubén Albés	Sacked	14 January 2021	14	(Romania) Liviu Ciobotariu	15 January 2021
Politehnica Iași	(Romania) Daniel Pancu	Sacked	28 January 2021	16	(Romania) Andrei Cristea	29 January 2021
Gaz Metan Mediaș	(Portugal) Jorge Costa	Sacked	1 February 2021	10	(Romania) Mihai Teja	1 February 2021
Universitatea Craiova	(Romania) Corneliu Papură	Sacked	1 February 2021	3	(Greece) Marinos Ouzounidis	5 February 2021
Viitorul Constanța	(Romania) Mircea Rednic	Sacked	8 April 2021	13	(Romania) Cătălin Anghel	11 April 2021
Voluntari	(Romania) Bogdan Andone	Sacked	8 May 2021	14	(Romania) Liviu Ciobotariu	8 May 2021
Astra Giurgiu	(Romania) Eugen Neagoe	Sacked	8 May 2021	13	(Romania) Ionuț Badea	9 May 2021

== Regular season ==
In the regular season the 16 teams will meet twice for a total of 30 matches per team, with the top 6 advancing to the Championship play-offs and the bottom 10 qualifying for the relegation play-outs.

=== Table ===
Pos	Team	Pld	W	D	L	GF	GA	GD	Pts	Qualification
1	FCSB	30	20	5	5	57	22	+35	65	Qualification for the Play-off round
2	CFR Cluj	30	19	7	4	42	15	+27	64	Qualification for the Play-off round
3	Universitatea Craiova	30	16	10	4	33	14	+19	58	Qualification for the Play-off round
4	Sepsi OSK	30	10	15	5	43	31	+12	45	Qualification for the Play-off round
5	Academica Clinceni	30	10	14	6	30	26	+4	44	Qualification for the Play-off round
6	Botoșani	30	11	9	10	39	36	+3	42	Qualification for the Play-off round
7	Argeș Pitești	30	10	10	10	33	41	−8	40	Qualification for the Play-out round
8	Chindia Târgoviște	30	10	9	11	24	26	−2	39	Qualification for the Play-out round
9	Astra Giurgiu	30	9	11	10	38	39	−1	38	Qualification for the Play-out round
10	UTA Arad	30	9	10	11	26	36	−10	37	Qualification for the Play-out round
11	Gaz Metan Mediaș	30	9	6	15	33	41	−8	33	Qualification for the Play-out round
12	Voluntari	30	8	8	14	32	40	−8	32	Qualification for the Play-out round
13	Viitorul Constanța	30	6	13	11	36	37	−1	31	Qualification for the Play-out round
14	Dinamo București	30	7	6	17	26	41	−15	27	Qualification for the Play-out round
15	Hermannstadt	30	5	11	14	28	40	−12	26	Qualification for the Play-out round
16	Politehnica Iași	30	7	4	19	29	64	−35	25	Qualification for the Play-out round

Source: LPF (in Romanian), Soccerway
Rules for classification: 1) Points; 2) Head-to-head points; 3) Head-to-head goal difference; 4) Head-to-head goals scored; 5) Goal difference; 6) Goals scored; 7) Play-off.

=== Results ===
Home \ Away	ACA	ARG	AST	BOT	CFR	CHI	DIN	FCS	GAZ	HER	IAS	SPS	UCV	UTA	VII	VOL
Academica Clinceni		1–0	1–1	2–1	1–2	0–0	1–1	0–2	2–0	0–0	2–1	2–0	0–0	0–3	1–0	0–1
Argeș Pitești	1–1		1–0	2–3	0–2	3–1	0–1	0–0	1–1	2–2	2–1	1–1	1–2	1–1	1–0	2–1
Astra Giurgiu	0–2	0–2		1–1	0–2	0–0	2–0	0–3	3–0	2–1	4–0	2–2	1–1	0–0	1–1	2–3
Botoșani	0–0	0–1	1–1		2–1	0–2	4–0	0–2	2–1	1–0	4–0	1–2	0–0	2–3	1–0	1–1
CFR Cluj	3–1	5–0	1–1	2–1		0–0	1–0	2–0	1–2	1–0	4–0	0–0	0–0	0–1	2–1	0–0
Chindia Târgoviște	2–1	2–2	0–1	2–3	0–1		1–0	0–2	1–0	1–3	1–1	1–2	1–0	1–1	1–1	1–0
Dinamo București	1–3	1–2	1–1	1–1	0–2	0–1		0–1	2–1	1–1	4–1	0–0	0–1	0–1	0–5	3–0
FCSB	0–1	3–0	3–0	4–1	3–0	1–0	3–2		1–0	5–0	3–1	1–1	0–0	3–0	3–0	2–1
Gaz Metan Mediaș	1–1	2–0	0–0	1–2	0–1	1–0	1–3	2–3		1–1	2–1	0–3	0–2	1–2	1–0	2–0
Hermannstadt	2–2	4–1	0–1	2–1	1–3	1–1	0–2	1–0	1–1		0–1	1–2	0–1	1–1	0–0	3–2
Politehnica Iași	0–0	1–1	2–3	0–1	0–2	1–0	1–0	5–2	1–4	1–0		1–4	0–3	1–2	0–3	0–2
Sepsi OSK	0–0	1–0	4–1	2–2	0–1	0–1	2–0	1–1	1–1	1–1	3–3		0–1	3–0	1–1	2–2
Universitatea Craiova	0–1	1–1	2–0	1–0	0–0	0–1	1–0	0–2	3–1	1–0	1–0	0–0		2–0	1–1	2–1
UTA Arad	0–0	1–2	0–6	0–0	0–1	1–0	0–1	0–1	1–3	1–1	2–3	2–0	1–2		0–0	0–0
Viitorul Constanța	1–1	2–2	4–1	1–2	1–1	0–0	2–1	2–2	0–2	2–1	1–2	3–3	1–4	1–1		0–1
Voluntari	3–3	0–1	1–3	1–1	0–1	0–2	1–1	2–1	2–1	1–0	4–0	1–2	1–1	0–1	0–2	

Source: LPF (in Romanian)
Legend: Blue = home team win; Yellow = draw; Red = away team win.

=== Positions by round ===
Team ╲ Round	1	2	3	4	5	6	7	8	9	10	11	12	13	14	15	16	17	18	19	20	21	22	23	24	25	26	27	28	29	30
Academica Clinceni	12	11	10	12	8	10	13	8	7	5	5	5	5	5	5	5	5	6	5	5	6	6	6	6	6	5	5	5	5	5
Argeș Pitești	11	15	14	15	15	15	15	15	14	14	15	16	16	16	16	16	15	12	12	12	13	12	10	7	9	8	7	7	8	7
Astra Giurgiu	16	16	15	16	16	16	16	16	16	16	16	15	14	13	10	12	12	13	13	13	12	13	13	10	10	10	8	8	9	9
Botoșani	2	2	2	4	5	8	10	5	8	11	11	11	10	8	8	10	10	7	7	7	5	5	5	5	5	6	6	6	6	6
CFR Cluj	3	4	4	2	2	3	3	3	3	3	3	3	3	3	3	2	2	2	2	2	2	2	2	2	2	2	2	2	2	2
Chindia Târgoviște	14	7	7	10	13	9	5	7	9	8	8	8	8	7	7	7	7	5	6	6	7	7	8	9	8	7	9	9	7	8
Dinamo București	7	12	12	9	12	14	14	14	15	15	14	12	9	10	11	8	8	11	11	9	10	11	11	12	13	13	14	14	14	14
FCSB	1	1	5	3	3	2	2	2	2	1	1	1	2	1	1	1	1	1	1	1	1	1	1	1	1	1	1	1	1	1
Gaz Metan Mediaș	13	6	6	6	9	11	12	13	10	9	9	10	13	14	12	9	9	9	10	10	11	8	9	11	11	12	12	13	13	11
Hermannstadt	8	9	11	7	6	5	6	11	12	12	12	13	12	11	14	14	14	14	14	15	14	15	14	14	15	15	15	15	15	15
Politehnica Iași	5	8	9	7	4	7	9	12	13	13	13	14	15	15	15	15	16	16	16	16	16	16	16	16	16	16	16	16	16	16
Sepsi OSK	15	13	13	13	10	6	4	4	4	4	4	4	4	4	4	4	4	4	4	4	4	4	4	4	4	4	4	4	4	4
Universitatea Craiova	6	3	1	1	1	1	1	1	1	2	2	2	1	2	2	3	3	3	3	3	3	3	3	3	3	3	3	3	3	3
UTA Arad	9	10	8	11	11	12	11	6	5	7	6	7	7	9	9	11	11	10	9	11	8	9	7	8	7	9	10	10	10	10
Viitorul Constanța	10	14	16	14	14	13	8	9	6	6	7	6	6	6	6	6	6	8	8	8	9	10	12	13	12	11	11	11	11	13
Voluntari	4	5	3	5	7	4	7	10	11	10	10	9	11	12	13	13	13	15	15	14	15	14	15	15	14	14	13	12	12	12

Leader and Qualification for the Play-off round
Qualification for the Play-off round
Qualification for the Play-out round

== Play-off round ==
The top six teams from Regular season will meet twice (10 matches per team) for places in 2021–22 UEFA Champions League, 2021–22 UEFA Europa League, and 2021–22 UEFA Europa Conference League as well as deciding the league champion. Teams start the Championship round with their points from the Regular season halved, rounded upwards, and no other records carried over from the Regular season.

=== Play-off table ===
Pos	Team	Pld	W	D	L	GF	GA	GD	Pts	Qualification	CFR	FCS	UCV	SPS	ACA	BOT
1	CFR Cluj (C)	10	7	1	2	15	5	+10	54	Qualification to Champions League first qualifying round		2–0	1–2	0–1	3–0	2–0
2	FCSB	10	3	3	4	13	14	−1	45	Qualification to Europa Conference League second qualifying round	1–1		0–1	1–2	2–2	2–1
3	Universitatea Craiova	10	3	3	4	9	11	−2	41	Qualification to Europa Conference League second qualifying round	1–3	2–0		0–0	0–0	2–3
4	Sepsi (O)	10	5	2	3	11	8	+3	40	Qualification to European competition play-offs	0–1	2–2	2–0		1–0	1–0
5	Academica Clinceni	10	3	2	5	10	15	−5	33		0–1	0–2	1–0	2–1		4–3
6	Botoșani	10	3	1	6	13	18	−5	31		0–1	1–3	1–1	2–1	2–1	

Source: , FRF (in Romanian), LPF (in Romanian)
Legend: Blue = home team win; Yellow = draw; Red = away team win.
Rules for classification: 1) Points; 2) Points without rounding; 3) Head-to-head points; 4) Head-to-head goal difference; 5) Head-to-head goals scored; 6) Goal difference; 7) Goals scored; 8) Play-off (only if needed to decide champion or teams for UEFA competitions). (Note: only criteria 6 and 7 are applied to establish the classification during the competition.)
(C) Champions; (O) Play-off winners

=== Positions by round ===
Team ╲ Round	30	31	32	33	34	35	36	37	38	39	40
CFR Cluj	2	2	2	2	1	1	1	1	1	1	1
FCSB	1	1	1	1	2	2	2	2	2	2	2
Universitatea Craiova	3	3	3	3	3	3	3	3	3	3	3
Sepsi	4	4	4	4	4	4	4	4	4	4	4
Academica Clinceni	5	5	5	6	6	6	6	6	6	5	5
Botoșani	6	6	6	5	5	5	5	5	5	6	6

Qualification to Champions League first qualifying round
Qualification to Europa Conference League second qualifying round
Qualification to European competition play-offs

Source: FRF

== Play-out round ==
The bottom ten teams from the regular season meet once to contest against relegation. Teams started the play-out round with their points from the Regular season halved, rounded upwards, and no other records carried over from the Regular season. The winner of the Relegation round finish 7th in the overall season standings, the second placed team – 8th, and so on, with the last placed team in the Relegation round being 16th.

=== Play-out table ===
Pos	Team	Pld	W	D	L	GF	GA	GD	Pts	Qualification or relegation	CHI	UTA	GAZ	VII	ARG	DIN	VOL	HER	AST	IAS
7	Chindia Târgoviște	9	4	4	1	7	3	+4	36	Qualification to European competition play-offs			1–1	0–2				2–0	0–0	2–0
8	UTA Arad (Note: UTA Arad failed to obtain a UEFA licence.)	9	4	1	4	7	9	−2	32 (Note: Points in the regular season: UTA 37, Gaz 33, Viitorul 31)		0–1		1–0	1–0				0–1		1–2
9	Gaz Metan Mediaș (Note: Gaz Metan Mediaș failed to obtain a UEFA licence.)	9	4	3	2	15	10	+5	32						1–1	4–1	1–1		2–1	4–2
10	Viitorul Constanța (E, M)	9	5	1	3	9	4	+5	32	Merged with Farul Constanța after qualification to European competition play-offs			1–0		1–0	1–2			1–0	
11	Argeș Pitești	9	3	2	4	10	7	+3	31 (Note: Points w/o rounding: Argeș 31.0, Dinamo 30.5)		0–1	4–1				1–2	3–0			0–0
12	Dinamo București	9	5	2	2	11	8	+3	31		0–0	0–1					2–0	2–0		
13	Voluntari (O)	9	3	3	3	6	7	−1	28	Qualification for the relegation play-offs	0–0	0–0		1–0				0–1		
14	Hermannstadt (R)	9	4	1	4	6	9	−3	26	Qualification for the relegation play-offs			1–2	0–0	1–0				1–3	
15	Astra Giurgiu (R)	9	1	2	6	6	12	−6	24	Relegation to 2021–22 Liga II		1–2			0–1	0–0	0–3			1–2
16	Politehnica Iași (R)	9	2	1	6	7	15	−8	20	Relegation to 2021–22 Liga II				0–3		1–2	0–1	0–1		

Source: Soccerway, FRF (in Romanian), LPF (in Romanian)
Legend: Blue = home team win; Yellow = draw; Red = away team win.
Rules for classification: 1) Points; 2) Points without rounding; 3) Points in the regular season; 4) Goal difference; 5) Goals scored; 6) Play-off (only if needed to decide teams for relegation). (Note: only criteria 4 and 5 are applied to establish the classification during the competition.)
(E) Eliminated; (M) Merged with another team; (O) Play-off winners; (R) Relegated

=== Positions by round ===
Team ╲ Round	30	31	32	33	34	35	36	37	38	39
Chindia Târgoviște	8	7	7	7	7	7	7	7	7	7
UTA Arad	10	8	8	8	9	10	9	10	9	8
Gaz Metan Mediaș	11	11	13	12	11	9	10	9	11	9
Viitorul Constanța	13	13	12	13	13	13	14	12	12	10
Argeș Pitești	7	9	10	9	8	8	8	8	8	11
Dinamo București	14	14	14	15	14	14	12	11	10	12
Voluntari	12	12	11	11	12	12	13	14	13	13
Hermannstadt	15	16	16	14	15	15	15	15	15	14
Astra Giurgiu	9	10	9	10	10	11	11	13	14	15
Politehnica Iași	16	15	15	16	16	16	16	16	16	16

Qualification to European competition play-offs
Qualification for the relegation play-offs
Relegation to 2021–22 Liga II
Qualification to European competition play-offs

Source: FRF

== European play-offs ==
In the semi-final, the 7th and 8th-placed teams of the Liga I plays a one-legged match on the ground of the better placed team (7th place). In the final, the winner of the semi-final will encounter the team ranked on the last UEFA Europa Conference League spot in the play-off tournament. The winner of the final will enter the second qualifying round of the UEFA Europa Conference League.

=== European play-off semi-final ===
27 May 2021	Chindia Târgoviște	2–3	Viitorul Constanța	Buzău
20:30 EEST (UTC+3)	Popa 6'; Rață 64'	Report	Artean 38'; Fernandes 49'; Tsoumou 86'	Stadium: Municipal; Referee: István Kovács (Carei)

=== European play-off final ===
30 May 2021	Sepsi OSK	1–0	Viitorul Constanța	Sfântu Gheorghe
20:30 EEST (UTC+3)	Aganović 42'	Report		Stadium: Municipal; Referee: Radu Petrescu (Bucharest)

== Promotion/relegation play-offs ==
The 13th and 14th-placed teams of the Liga I faces the 3rd and 4th-placed team of the Liga II.

Team 1	Agg.	Team 2	1st leg	2nd leg
Dunărea Călărași	1–6	Voluntari	1–2	0–4
Mioveni	2–1	Hermannstadt	0–0	2–1

=== First leg ===
29 May 2021	Mioveni	0–0	Hermannstadt	Mioveni
15:30 EEST (UTC+3)		Report		Stadium: Orășenesc; Referee: Ovidiu Hațegan (Arad)

29 May 2021	Dunărea Călărași	1–2	Voluntari	Călărași
18:00 EEST (UTC+3)	Kanda 31'	Report	Betancor 42'; Vlad 73'	Stadium: Ion Comșa; Referee: Sebastian Colțescu (Craiova)

=== Second leg ===
2 June 2021	Hermannstadt	1–2	Mioveni	Mediaș
19:00 EEST (UTC+3)	Yazalde 21'		Massaro 72'; Panait 90+3'	Stadium: Gaz Metan; Referee: Horațiu Feșnic (Cluj-Napoca)

3 June 2021	Voluntari	4-0	Dunărea Călărași	Voluntari
20:30 EEST (UTC+3)	Dropa 7'; Betancor 18'; I.Armaș 79'; C. Achim 86' (pen.)			Stadium: Anghel Iordănescu; Referee: Horia Mladinovici (Bucharest)

== Season statistics ==
=== Top scorers ===
As of games played on 20 May 2021

Rank	Player	Club	Goals
1	(Romania) Florin Tănase	FCSB	24
2	(Switzerland) Cephas Malele	FC Argeș	18
3	(Romania) Dennis Man	FCSB	14
3	(France) Hamidou Keyta	Botoșani	14
4	(Romania) Ciprian Deac	CFR Cluj	13
5	(Romania) Alexandru Cicâldău	Universitatea Craiova	11
6	(Netherlands) Kevin Luckassen	Viitorul Constanța	9
6	(Romania) Ronaldo Deaconu	Gaz Metan	9
7	(Romania) Constantin Budescu	Astra Giurgiu	8
7	(Croatia) Gabriel Debeljuh	CFR Cluj	8
7	(Romania) Olimpiu Morutan	FCSB	8

=== Top assists ===
As of games played on 23 April 2021

Rank	Player	Club	Assists
1	(Romania) Olimpiu Moruțan	FCSB	15
2	(Romania) Constantin Budescu	Astra Giurgiu	8
3	(Romania) Deian Sorescu	Dinamo București	7
3	(Romania) Ronaldo Deaconu	Gaz Metan Medias	7
5	(Romania) Petrișor Petrescu	Hermannstadt	6
6	(Romania) Florinel Coman	FCSB	5
6	(Romania) Dan Nistor	Universitatea Craiova	5
6	(Argentina) Juan Pablo Passaglia	Politehnica Iași	5
6	(Romania) Ciprian Deac	CFR Cluj	5
6	(Romania) Adrian Păun	CFR Cluj	5

=== Hat-tricks ===
Player	For	Against	Result	Date
(Romania) Dennis Man	FCSB	FC Argeș	3–0 (H)	20 September 2020
(Romania) Andrei Cristea	Politehnica Iași	FCSB	5–2 (H)	27 September 2020
(Romania) Constantin Budescu	Astra Giurgiu	UTA Arad	6–0 (A)	21 December 2020

Notes

(H) – Home team
(A) – Away team

=== Double ===
Player	For	Against	Result	Date
(Croatia) Marko Dugandžić	Botoșani	Politehnica Iași	4–0 (H)	30 August 2020
(Romania) Valentin Gheorghe	Astra Giurgiu	Sepsi OSK	2–2 (H)	13 September 2020
(Bosnia and Herzegovina) Elvir Koljić	Universitatea Craiova	Viitorul Constanța	4–1 (A)	14 September 2020
(Romania) Gabriel Iancu	Viitorul Constanța	Astra Giurgiu	4–1 (H)	26 September 2020
(Spain) Jefté Betancor	Voluntari	Astra Giurgiu	3–2 (A)	3 October 2020
(Romania) Florin Tănase	FCSB	Dinamo București	3–2 (H)	3 October 2020
(Switzerland) Cephas Malele	FC Argeș	Viitorul Constanța	2–2 (A)	25 October 2020
(Romania) Vlad Morar	UTA Arad	Botoșani	2–3 (A)	31 October 2020
(Romania) Cosmin Achim	Voluntari	Politehnica Iași	4–0 (H)	7 November 2020
(Romania) Dennis Man	FCSB	Botoșani	4–1 (H)	7 November 2020
(Romania) Florin Tănase (2)	FCSB	Botoșani	4–1 (H)	7 November 2020
(Venezuela) Mario Rondón	CFR Cluj	FC Argeș	2–0 (H)	8 November 2020
(Italy) Nicolao Dumitru	Gaz Metan Mediaș	UTA Arad	3–1 (A)	9 November 2020
(Spain) Borja Valle	Dinamo București	Voluntari	3–0 (H)	20 November 2020
(Romania) Darius Olaru	FCSB	Gaz Metan Mediaș	3–2 (A)	23 November 2020
(Romania) Ciprian Deac	CFR Cluj	Politehnica Iași	2–0 (A)	6 December 2020
(France) Hamidou Keyta	Botoșani	Viitorul Constanța	2–1 (A)	15 December 2020
(Switzerland) Cephas Malele (2)	FC Argeș	Hermannstadt	2–2 (H)	16 December 2020
(Slovakia) Pavol Šafranko	Sepsi OSK	UTA Arad	3–0 (H)	17 December 2020
(Romania) Dennis Man (2)	FCSB	Universitatea Craiova	2–0 (A)	18 December 2020
(Israel) Shlomi Azulay	Astra Giurgiu	UTA Arad	6–0 (A)	21 December 2020
(Portugal) Ze Manuel	Gaz Metan Mediaș	FC Voluntari	2–0 (H)	12 January 2021
(Romania) Florin Tănase (3)	FCSB	Astra Giurgiu	3–0 (H)	14 January 2021
(France) Hamidou Keyta (2)	FC Botoșani	Dinamo București	4–0 (H)	24 January 2021
(Netherlands) Kevin Luckassen	FC Viitorul	Sepsi OSK	3–3 (H)	26 January 2021
(Romania) Andrei Ciobanu	FC Viitorul	Dinamo Bucuresti	5–0 (A)	26 February 2021
(Bulgaria) Antoni Ivanov	FC Voluntari	Politehnica Iași	2–0 (A)	1 March 2021
(Romania) Ciprian Deac (2)	CFR Cluj	FC Arges	5–0 (H)	1 March 2021
(Switzerland) Cephas Malele (3)	FC Argeș	Politehnica Iași	2–1 (H)	8 March 2021
(Romania) Ciprian Deac (3)	CFR Cluj	Politehnica Iași	4–0 (H)	14 March 2021
(Portugal) Yazalde	FC Hermannstadt	FC Arges	4–1 (H)	3 April 2021
(Switzerland) Cephas Malele (4)	FC Arges	Chindia	3–1 (H)	9 April 2021
(Romania) Florin Tanase (4)	FCSB	Academica Clinceni	2–0 (A)	22 April 2021

Notes

(H) – Home team
(A) – Away team

=== Clean sheets ===
As of games played on 23 April 2021

Rank	Player	Club	Clean sheets
1	(Italy) Mirko Pigliacelli	Universitatea Craiova	19
2	(Romania) Andrei Vlad	FCSB	17
3	(Romania) Cristian Bălgrădean	CFR Cluj	16
4	(Romania) Octavian Vâlceanu	Academica Clinceni	14
5	(Romania) Mihai Aioani	Chindia Târgovişte	13
6	(Romania) Florin Iacob	UTA Arad	10
7	(Romania) Roland Niczuly	Sepsi OSK	9
7	(Romania) David Lazar	Astra Giurgiu	9
9	(Romania) Victor Rîmniceanu	Voluntari	8
10	(Romania) Valentin Cojocaru	Viitorul Constanta	6
10	(Romania) Alexandru Greab	Argeș Pitești	6

=== Discipline ===
As of games played on 16 February 2021

==== Player ====
- Most yellow cards: 9
  - (Ivory Coast) Ousmane Viera (Hermannstadt)
- Most red cards: 2
  - (Czech Republic) Ondřej Bačo (Gaz Metan Mediaș)
  - (Romania) Alexandru Benga (UTA Arad)
  - (Romania) Valentin Gheorghe (Astra Giurgiu)
  - (Romania) Gabriel Matei (FC Argeș)

==== Team ====
- Most yellow cards: 74
  - Hermannstadt
  - Gaz Metan Mediaș
- Most red cards: 6
  - Botoșani
- Fewest yellow cards: 34
  - Universitatea Craiova
- Fewest red cards: 0
  - CFR Cluj

== Champion squad ==
CFR Cluj

Goalkeepers: Giedrius Arlauskis (Lithuania) (6 / 0); Cristian Bălgrădean (26 / 0); Rareș Murariu (1 / 0); Grzegorz Sandomierski (Poland) (11 / 0).
Defenders: Syam Ben Youssef (Tunisia) (7 / 0); Kévin Boli (Ivory Coast) (1 / 0); Andrei Burcă (35 / 2); Mihai Butean (1 / 0); Mário Camora (Portugal) (35 / 0); Mike Cestor (Democratic Republic of the Congo) (6 / 0); Denis Ciobotariu (11 / 1); Cristian Manea (26 / 0); Iasmin Latovlevici (7 / 0); Paulo Vinícius (Brazil) (25 / 3); Mateo Sušić (Bosnia and Herzegovina) (26 / 0).
Midfielders: Luís Aurélio (Portugal) (11 / 0); Mihai Bordeianu (12 / 0); Nicolae Carnat (10 / 0); Alexandru Chipciu (30 / 2); Valentin Costache (35 / 4); Ciprian Deac (34 / 13); Damjan Đoković (Croatia) (16 / 0); Adrian Gîdea (21 / 1); Ovidiu Hoban (28 / 1); Cătălin Itu (24 / 3); Dodi Joca (5 / 0); Sebastian Mailat (1 / 0); Michaël Pereira (France) (21 / 0); Rúnar Sigurjónsson (Iceland) (12 / 3); Adrian Păun (39 / 5); Claudiu Petrila (6 / 1); William Soares (Brazil) (16 / 0); Ivica Žunić (Croatia) (1 / 0).
Forwards: Gabriel Debeljuh (Croatia) (32 / 8); Cătălin Golofca (1 / 0); Gheorghe Gondiu (Moldova) (1 / 0); Billel Omrani (Algeria) (16 / 3); Mario Rondón (Venezuela) (29 / 5); Jakub Vojtuš (Slovakia) (7 / 0).
(league appearances and goals listed in brackets)

Manager: Dan Petrescu / Edward Iordănescu.

== Awards ==
=== Liga I Team of the Season ===

Liga I Team of the 2020–21 Season – Liga Profesionistă de Fotbal
