= 2023–24 FC Hermannstadt season =

FC Hermannstadt
2023–24 season
- Manager: Marius Măldărășanu
- Stadium: Sibiu Municipal Stadium
- Liga I: 6th
- Cupa României: Group stage
- Top goalscorer: League: Silviu Balaure (5); All: Silviu Balaure (6)
- Average home league attendance: 5,643

The 2023–24 season is FC Hermannstadt's 9th season in existence and second consecutive in the Liga I. They are also competing in the Cupa României.

== Players ==
=== First-team squad ===
As of 18 September 2023

Note: Flags indicate national team as defined under FIFA eligibility rules; some limited exceptions apply. Players may hold more than one non-FIFA nationality.

No.	Pos.	Nation	Player
1	GK	ROU	Octavian Vâlceanu
2	DF	ARG	Cristian Paz
4	MF	CRO	Ljuban Crepulja
5	DF	MDA	Igor Armaș (Captain)
6	MF	CZE	Lukáš Droppa
7	DF	ALB	Naser Aliji
8	MF	ROU	Mihai Răduț
9	FW	ROU	Andrei Dumiter
10	MF	ROU	George Merloi
11	FW	ROU	Daniel Florea
14	MF	POR	Marcelo Lopes
16	MF	ISL	Rúnar Már Sigurjónsson
17	MF	ROU	Doru Andrei
19	MF	BIH	Luka Božičković
20	FW	ROU	Robert Popescu

No.	Pos.	Nation	Player
21	FW	ROU	Andreas Niță
22	MF	MDA	Vadim Rață (4th captain)
23	FW	ROU	Nicolae Carnat
24	DF	POR	Ricardinho (Vice-captain)
25	MF	ROU	Angelo Cocian
27	DF	ROU	Radu Boboc
28	DF	ROU	Vlăduț Andreș
29	FW	ROU	Eduard Lambrinoc
34	DF	ARG	Patricio Matricardi
72	MF	ROU	Roberto Voican
77	FW	SVK	Adam Nemec (3rd captain)
80	FW	ROU	Robert Mustacă
88	GK	ESP	Jesús Fernández
90	MF	ROU	Alexandru Munteanu
99	FW	ROU	Andrei Dima

=== Other players under contract ===
Note: Flags indicate national team as defined under FIFA eligibility rules; some limited exceptions apply. Players may hold more than one non-FIFA nationality.

No.	Pos.	Nation	Player
12	GK	ROU	Victor Rîmniceanu

=== Out on loan ===
Note: Flags indicate national team as defined under FIFA eligibility rules; some limited exceptions apply. Players may hold more than one non-FIFA nationality.

No.	Pos.	Nation	Player
—	GK	ROU	Daniel Paraschiv (to Progresul Spartac)
—	DF	ROU	Radu Zamfir (to Gloria Buzău)

No.	Pos.	Nation	Player
—	MF	MEX	Omar Govea (to Monterrey)
—	MF	ROU	Florin Bălan (to Gloria Bistrița)

== Transfers ==
=== In ===
Pos.	Player	Transferred from	Fee	Date	Source
MF	(Romania) Cristian Neguț	(Romania) Chindia Târgoviște	Free	1 July 2023	
FW	(Romania) Gabriel Iancu	(Russia) Akhmat Grozny	Free	1 July 2023	
MF	(Italy) Alessandro Murgia	(Italy) SPAL	Free	9 August 2023	
GK	(Romania) Cătălin Căbuz	(Romania) CFR Cluj	Free	24 August 2023	

=== Out ===
Pos.	Player	Transferred to	Fee	Date	Source
MF	(Germany) Vesel Limaj	(Kosovo) FC Ballkani	€30,000	6 July 2023	
DF	(Romania) Raul Oprut	(Belgium) Kortrijk	€400,000	31 July 2023	
GK	(Croatia) Karlo Letica	(Switzerland) Lausanne-Sport	€300,000	24 August 2023	
MF	(Romania) Călin Popescu	(Cyprus) Othellos Athienou	Free	1 September 2023	

== Pre-season and friendlies ==
Win Draw Loss Fixtures

22 June 2023 Friendly	Shkupi (North Macedonia)	2–1	(Romania) Hermannstadt

24 June 2023 Friendly	Hermannstadt (Romania)	0–0	(Albania) Egnatia

29 June 2023 Friendly	Shkupi (North Macedonia)	1–0	(Romania) Hermannstadt

6 July 2023 Friendly	Hermannstadt (Romania)	1–0	(Romania) Șelimbăr
11:00

7 July 2023 Friendly	Hermannstadt (Romania)	5–1	(Romania) Csíkszereda
17:30

13 August 2023 Friendly	CFR Cluj (Romania)	3–2	(Romania) Hermannstadt
12:00

== Competitions ==
=== Overall record ===
Competition	First match	Last match	Starting round	Record							
Competition	First match	Last match	Starting round	Pld	W	D	L	GF	GA	GD	Win %
Liga I	15 July 2023	March 2024	Matchday 1	17	5	10	2	24	16	+8	29.41
Cupa României	31 August 2023		Round of 16	3	2	1	0	12	3	+9	66.67
Total				20	7	11	2	36	19	+17	35.00

Last updated: 24 November 2023
Source: Soccerway

=== Liga I ===
==== League table ====
Pos	Team	Pld	W	D	L	GF	GA	GD	Pts	Qualification
7	Universitatea Cluj	30	10	12	8	35	38	−3	42	Qualification to play-out round
8	UTA Arad	30	10	10	10	36	43	−7	40 (Note: Head to head points: UTA 3 (+1), Hermannstadt 3 (-1))	Qualification to play-out round
9	Hermannstadt	30	9	13	8	36	31	+5	40	Qualification to play-out round
10	Petrolul Ploiești	30	7	14	9	29	32	−3	35	Qualification to play-out round
11	Oțelul Galați	30	6	16	8	31	36	−5	34	Qualification to play-out round

Source: , Soccerway
Rules for classification: 1) Points; 2) Head-to-head points; 3) Head-to-head goal difference; 4) Head-to-head goals scored; 5) Goal difference; 6) Goals scored; 7) Play-off.

==== Results summary ====
Overall								Home						Away					
Pld	W	D	L	GF	GA	GD	Pts	W	D	L	GF	GA	GD	W	D	L	GF	GA	GD
0	0	0	0	0	0	0	0	0	0	0	0	0	0	0	0	0	0	0	0

Last updated: 24 November 2023.
Source: Superliga

==== Results by round ====
Round	1	2	3	4	5	6	7	8	9	10	11	12	13	14	15	16	17	18
Ground	H	A	H	A	H	A	H	A	H	A	H	A	H	A	H	A	H	A
Result	L	W	W	L	D	D	D	D	W	D	D	D	W	D	W	D	D	
Position																		

Updated to match(es) played on 24 November 2023. Source: Superliga
A = Away; H = Home; W = Win; D = Draw; L = Loss

==== Matches ====
The league fixtures were unveiled on 27 June 2023.

15 July 2023 1	Hermannstadt	0–1	Farul Constanța	Sibiu
18:30 UTC+3			Grameni 57'	Stadium: Stadionul Municipal; Referee: István Kovács

23 July 2023 2	Politehnica Iași	1–3	Hermannstadt
18:30 EEST (UTC+3)

29 July 2023 3	Hermannstadt	2–1	UTA Arad	Sibiu
18:30 EEST (UTC+3)				Stadium: Stadionul Municipal

4 August 2023 4	Universitatea Craiova	1–0	Hermannstadt
21:30 EEST (UTC+3)

21 August 2023 6	Sepsi OSK	1–1	Hermannstadt
18:30 EEST (UTC+3)

28 August 2023 7	Hermannstadt	2–2	Universitatea Cluj	Sibiu
18:30 EEST (UTC+3)				Stadium: Stadionul Municipal

4 September 2023 8	Botoșani	2–2	Hermannstadt
18:30 EEST (UTC+3)

17 September 2023 9	Hermannstadt	3–1	Voluntari	Sibiu
17:00 EEST (UTC+3)				Stadium: Stadionul Municipal

21 September 2023 5	Hermannstadt	2–2	FCSB	Sibiu
20:00 EEST (UTC+3)				Stadium: Stadionul Municipal

24 September 2023 10	Petrolul Ploiești	0–0	Hermannstadt
18:15 EEST (UTC+3)

1 October 2023 11	Hermannstadt	1–1	Rapid București	Sibiu
18:00 EEST (UTC+3)				Stadium: Stadionul Municipal

6 October 2023 12	FC U Craiova 1948	1–1	Hermannstadt
18:00 EEST (UTC+3)

21 October 2023 13	Hermannstadt	4–0	Dinamo București	Sibiu
17:00 EEST (UTC+3)				Stadium: Stadionul Municipal

28 October 2023 14	Oțelul Galați	1–1	Hermannstadt
14:00 EEST (UTC+3)

6 November 2023 15	Hermannstadt	1–0	CFR Cluj	Sibiu
21:00 EET (UTC+1)				Stadium: Stadionul Municipal

11 November 2023 16	Farul Constanța	1–1	Hermannstadt	Ovidiu
21:00 EET (UTC+2)				Stadium: Stadionul Viitorul

24 November 2023 17	Hermannstadt	0–0	Politehnica Iași	Sibiu
17:30 EET (UTC+1)				Stadium: Stadionul Municipal

2 December 2023 18	UTA Arad	v	Hermannstadt	Oradea
14:00 EET (UTC+2)				Stadium: Stadionul Iuliu Bodola

=== Cupa României ===
August 2023 Play-off round	v
EEST (UTC+2)

==== Group stage ====
December 2023	v
EEST (UTC+2)
