= 2023–24 FC Voluntari season =

FC Voluntari
2023–24 season
- Manager: Ilie Poenaru (until 31 January); Nicolae Dică (31 January–12 March); Florin Pârvu (from 12 March)
- Stadium: Stadionul Anghel Iordănescu
- Liga I: 15th (relegated)
- Cupa României: Semi-finals
- Top goalscorer: League: Adam Nemec (9); All: Adam Nemec (9)

The 2023–24 season was FC Voluntari's 14th season in existence and ninth consecutive in the Liga I. They also competed in the Cupa României.

== Players ==
=== First-team squad ===
As of 18 September 2023

Note: Flags indicate national team as defined under FIFA eligibility rules; some limited exceptions apply. Players may hold more than one non-FIFA nationality.

No.	Pos.	Nation	Player
1	GK	ROU	Octavian Vâlceanu
2	DF	ARG	Cristian Paz
4	MF	CRO	Ljuban Crepulja
5	DF	MDA	Igor Armaș (Captain)
6	MF	CZE	Lukáš Droppa
7	DF	ALB	Naser Aliji
8	MF	ROU	Mihai Răduț
9	FW	ROU	Andrei Dumiter
10	MF	ROU	George Merloi
11	FW	ROU	Daniel Florea
14	MF	POR	Marcelo Lopes
16	MF	ISL	Rúnar Már Sigurjónsson
17	MF	ROU	Doru Andrei
19	MF	BIH	Luka Božičković
20	FW	ROU	Robert Popescu

No.	Pos.	Nation	Player
21	FW	ROU	Andreas Niță
22	MF	MDA	Vadim Rață (4th captain)
23	FW	ROU	Nicolae Carnat
24	DF	POR	Ricardinho (Vice-captain)
25	MF	ROU	Angelo Cocian
27	DF	ROU	Radu Boboc
28	DF	ROU	Vlăduț Andreș
29	FW	ROU	Eduard Lambrinoc
34	DF	ARG	Patricio Matricardi
72	MF	ROU	Roberto Voican
77	FW	SVK	Adam Nemec (3rd captain)
80	FW	ROU	Robert Mustacă
88	GK	ESP	Jesús Fernández
90	MF	ROU	Alexandru Munteanu
99	FW	ROU	Andrei Dima

=== Other players under contract ===
Note: Flags indicate national team as defined under FIFA eligibility rules; some limited exceptions apply. Players may hold more than one non-FIFA nationality.

No.	Pos.	Nation	Player
12	GK	ROU	Victor Rîmniceanu

=== Out on loan ===
Note: Flags indicate national team as defined under FIFA eligibility rules; some limited exceptions apply. Players may hold more than one non-FIFA nationality.

No.	Pos.	Nation	Player
—	GK	ROU	Daniel Paraschiv (to Progresul Spartac)
—	DF	ROU	Radu Zamfir (to Gloria Buzău)

No.	Pos.	Nation	Player
—	MF	MEX	Omar Govea (to Monterrey)
—	MF	ROU	Florin Bălan (to Gloria Bistrița)

== Transfers ==
=== In ===
Pos.	Player	Transferred from	Fee	Date	Source
MF	(Croatia) Ljuban Crepulja	(Romania) Rapid București	Free	1 July 2023	
MF	(Romania) Angelo Cocian	(Romania) Unirea Dej	€15,000	1 July 2023	
GK	(Romania) Valentin Mărgărit	(Romania) CSM Focșani	Free	11 July 2023	
MF	(Romania) Nicolae Carnat	(Romania) Farul Constanța	Free	1 September 2023	
MF	(Bosnia and Herzegovina) Luka Božičković	(Slovenia) Maribor	Free	14 September 2023	

=== Out ===
Pos.	Player	Transferred to	Fee	Date	Source

== Pre-season and friendlies ==
Win Draw Loss

28 June 2023 Friendly	GKS Katowice (Poland)	0–1	(Romania) Voluntari
13:00

30 June 2023 Friendly	Ruch Chorzow (Poland)	0–0	(Romania) Voluntari
18:00

4 Jul 2023 Friendly	Voluntari (Romania)	0–3	(Israel) Hapoel Be'er Sheva
18:00

== Competitions ==
=== Overall record ===
Competition	First match	Last match	Starting round	Final position	Record							
Competition	First match	Last match	Starting round	Final position	Pld	W	D	L	GF	GA	GD	Win %
Liga I	17 July 2023	9 March 2024	Matchday 1	15th	39	8	14	17	42	59	−17	20.51
Cupa României	29 August 2023	17 April 2024	Round of 16	Semi-finals	6	2	3	1	6	5	+1	33.33
Total					45	10	17	18	48	64	−16	22.22

Source: Soccerway

=== Liga I ===
==== League table ====
Pos	Team	Pld	W	D	L	GF	GA	GD	Pts	Qualification
12	Politehnica Iași	30	7	12	11	33	44	−11	33	Qualification to play-out round
13	FCU 1948 Craiova	30	9	4	17	43	50	−7	31	Qualification to play-out round
14	Dinamo București	30	8	5	17	22	41	−19	29	Qualification to play-out round
15	Voluntari	30	6	10	14	31	49	−18	28	Qualification to play-out round
16	Botoșani	30	3	12	15	30	52	−22	21	Qualification to play-out round

Source: , Soccerway
Rules for classification: 1) Points; 2) Head-to-head points; 3) Head-to-head goal difference; 4) Head-to-head goals scored; 5) Goal difference; 6) Goals scored; 7) Play-off.

==== Results summary ====
Overall								Home						Away					
Pld	W	D	L	GF	GA	GD	Pts	W	D	L	GF	GA	GD	W	D	L	GF	GA	GD
19	6	6	7	26	32	−6	24	3	2	4	12	15	−3	3	4	3	14	17	−3

Last updated: 9 December 2023.
Source: Superliga

==== Results by round ====
Round	1	2	3	4	5	6	7	8	9	10	11	12	13	14	15	16	17	18	19
Ground	H	A	A	H	A	H	A	H	A	H	A	H	A	H	A	A	H	H	A
Result	W	L	W	W	L	L	D	L	L	L	D	D	D	L	W	D	W	D	W
Position	4	8	6	2	4	6	7	9	12	13	13	13	13	14	13	13			

Updated to match(es) played on 9 December 2023. Source: Superliga
A = Away; H = Home; W = Win; D = Draw; L = Loss

==== Matches ====
17 July 2023 1	Voluntari	2–1	Botoșani	Voluntari
18:30 EEST (UTC+2)				Stadium: Stadionul Anghel Iordănescu; Referee: Cătălin Buşi

22 July 2023 2	Farul Constanța	4–1	Voluntari	Ovidiu
18:15 EEST (UTC+2)				Stadium: Stadionul Viitorul; Referee: Ionuţ Coza

31 July 2023 3	Petrolul Ploiești	0–2	Voluntari	Ploiești
18:30 EEST (UTC+2)				Stadium: Ilie Oană Stadium

7 August 2023 4	Voluntari	2–1	Rapid București	Voluntari
21:30 EEST (UTC+2)				Stadium: Stadionul Anghel Iordănescu

11 August 2023 5	U Craiova 1948	3–1	Voluntari	Craiova
20:30 EEST (UTC+2)				Stadium: Stadionul Ion Oblemenco

19 August 2023 6	Voluntari	2–3	Dinamo București	Voluntari
21:45 EEST (UTC+2)				Stadium: Stadionul Anghel Iordănescu

25 August 2023 7	Oțelul Galați	2–2	Voluntari	Galați
18:30 EEST (UTC+2)				Stadium: Stadionul Oțelul

2 September 2023 8	Voluntari	1–4	CFR Cluj	Voluntari
19:00 EEST (UTC+2)				Stadium: Stadionul Anghel Iordănescu

17 September 2023 9	Hermannstadt	3–1	Voluntari	Sibiu
17:00 EEST (UTC+2)				Stadium: Stadionul Municipal Sibiu

23 September 2023 10	Voluntari	1–2	Politehnica Iași	Voluntari
14:30 EEST (UTC+2)				Stadium: Stadionul Anghel Iordănescu

30 September 2023 11	UTA Arad	0–0	Voluntari	Arad
14:30 EEST (UTC+2)				Stadium: Stadionul Francisc von Neuman

7 October 2023 12	Voluntari	0–0	Universitatea Craiova	Voluntari
18:45 EEST (UTC+2)				Stadium: Stadionul Anghel Iordănescu

22 October 2023 13	FCSB	0–0	Voluntari	Bucharest
21:00 EEST (UTC+2)				Stadium: Arena Națională

27 October 2023 14	Voluntari	0–2	Sepsi OSK	Voluntari
17:30 EEST (UTC+2)			Ștefănescu 5'; Šafranko 75'	Stadium: Stadionul Anghel Iordănescu; Referee: Horia Mladinovici

5 November 2023 15	Universitatea Cluj	1–2	Voluntari	Cluj-Napoca
15:00 EET (UTC+1)	Stoica 12'		Nemec 31'; Dumiter 61', (penalty missed) 90+7'	Stadium: Cluj Arena; Referee: Cătălin Popa

12 November 2023 16	Botoșani	3–3	Voluntari	Botoșani
13:30 EET (UTC+1)	Dican 38'; David 42'; Florescu 71'		Andrei 7'; Popescu 46'; Rață 58' (pen.), (penalty missed) 90+8'	Stadium: Stadionul Municipal; Referee: Szabolcs Kovacs

25 November 2023 17	Voluntari	4–2	Farul Constanța	Voluntari
17:30 EET (UTC+1)	Popescu 10'; Dumiter 22', 37'; Sîrbu 55' (o.g.)		Rivaldinho 47', 64'	Stadium: Stadionul Anghel Iordănescu; Referee: Ovidiu Hațegan

1 December 2023 18	Voluntari	0–0	Petrolul Ploiești	Voluntari
17:00 EET (UTC+1)				Stadium: Stadionul Anghel Iordănescu; Referee: George Găman

9 December 2023 19	Rapid București	1–2	Voluntari	Bucharest
20:45 EET (UTC+1)	Papeau 82'		Nemec 66'; Ricardinho 73'	Stadium: Stadionul Rapid-Giulești; Referee: Iulian Călin

15 December 2023 20	Voluntari	v	U Craiova 1948	Voluntari
17:00 EET (UTC+1)				Stadium: Stadionul Anghel Iordănescu

22 December 2023 21	Dinamo București	v	Voluntari	Bucharest
18:30 EET (UTC+1)				Stadium: Stadionul Dinamo

20 January 2024 22	Voluntari	v	Oțelul Galați	Voluntari
--:-- EET (UTC+1)				Stadium: Stadionul Anghel Iordănescu

27 January 2024 23	CFR Cluj	v	Voluntari	Cluj-Napoca
--:-- EET (UTC+1)				Stadium: Stadionul Dr. Constantin Rădulescu

3 February 2024 24	Voluntari	v	Hermannstadt	Voluntari
--:-- EET (UTC+1)				Stadium: Stadionul Anghel Iordănescu

10 February 2024 25	Politehnica Iași	v	Voluntari	Iași
--:-- EET (UTC+1)				Stadium: Stadionul Emil Alexandrescu

17 February 2024 26	Voluntari	v	UTA Arad	Voluntari
--:-- EET (UTC+1)				Stadium: Stadionul Anghel Iordănescu

24 February 2024 27	Universitatea Craiova	v	Voluntari	Craiova
--:-- EET (UTC+1)				Stadium: Stadionul Ion Oblemenco

28 February 2024 28	Voluntari	v	FCSB	Voluntari
--:-- EET (UTC+1)				Stadium: Stadionul Anghel Iordănescu

2 March 2024 29	Sepsi OSK	v	Voluntari	Sfântu Gheorghe
--:-- EET (UTC+1)				Stadium: Stadionul Sepsi Arena

9 March 2024 30	Voluntari	v	Universitatea Cluj	Voluntari
--:-- EET (UTC+1)				Stadium: Stadionul Anghel Iordănescu

=== Cupa României ===
29 August 2023 Play-off round	1599 Șelimbăr	1–2	Voluntari	Cisnădie
17:30 EEST (UTC+2)				Stadium: Stadionul Măgura; Referee: Sorin Vădana

==== Group stage ====
26 September 2023 1	Voluntari	2–0	Farul Constanța	Voluntari
18:30 EEST (UTC+2)				Stadium: Stadionul Anghel Iordănescu; Referee: Marcel Bîrsan

1 November 2023 2	CS Tunari	1–1	Voluntari	Tunari
15:00 EET (UTC+1)				Stadium: Stadionul Comunal; Referee: Lucian Ruşandu

5 December 2023 3	UTA Arad	0–0	Voluntari	Oradea
19:00 EET (UTC+1)				Stadium: Stadionul Iuliu Bodola; Referee: István Kovács
