= 2022–23 FC Voluntari season =

FC Voluntari
2022–23 season
- General director: Bogdan Bălănescu
- Head coach: Liviu Ciobotariu
- Stadium: Stadionul Anghel Iordănescu
- Liga I: 10th
- Play-out round: European play-off semi-final
- Cupa României: Group stage
- Top goalscorer: League: Adam Nemec (10); All: Adam Nemec (10)
Home colours	Away colours	Third colours

The 2022–23 FC Voluntari season was the club's 13th season in existence and the seventh consecutive season in the top flight of Romanian football. In addition to the domestic league, Voluntari participated in this season's edition of the Cupa României.

== Players ==
As of 26 January 2023

Note: Flags indicate national team as defined under FIFA eligibility rules; some limited exceptions apply. Players may hold more than one non-FIFA nationality.

No.	Pos.	Nation	Player
2	DF	ARG	Cristian Paz
3	DF	CIV	Ulrich Meleke
5	DF	MDA	Igor Armaș (Captain)
6	MF	CZE	Lukáš Droppa
7	DF	ALB	Naser Aliji
8	MF	ROU	Mihai Răduț
9	FW	MDA	Vitalie Damașcan (on loan from Sepsi)
10	MF	ROU	George Merloi
11	FW	ROU	Daniel Florea
12	GK	ROU	Victor Rîmniceanu
13	FW	ROU	Andrei Dumiter
14	MF	POR	Marcelo Lopes
16	MF	ISL	Rúnar Már Sigurjónsson
17	MF	ROU	Doru Andrei
18	MF	CPV	Hélder Tavares

No.	Pos.	Nation	Player
20	MF	ROU	Robert Popescu
22	MF	MDA	Vadim Rață
23	DF	ROU	Alexandru Vlad (Vice-captain)
24	DF	POR	Ricardinho (3rd captain)
28	DF	ROU	Vlăduț Andreș
34	DF	ARG	Patricio Matricardi
56	GK	ROU	Daniel Paraschiv
71	GK	ROU	Mihai Popa
72	MF	ROU	Roberto Voican
77	FW	SVK	Adam Nemec
80	FW	CIV	Aymar Meleke
88	GK	ESP	Jesús Fernández
90	MF	ROU	Alexandru Munteanu
98	DF	ROU	Cristian Costin

=== Out on loan ===
Note: Flags indicate national team as defined under FIFA eligibility rules; some limited exceptions apply. Players may hold more than one non-FIFA nationality.

No.	Pos.	Nation	Player
—	GK	ROU	Octavian Vâlceanu (to Petrolul Ploiești)
—	DF	ROU	Radu Zamfir (to Progresul Spartac)
—	MF	ROU	Alexandru Ilie (to Afumați)

No.	Pos.	Nation	Player
—	MF	ROU	Alexandru Stoica (to Afumați)
—	MF	MEX	Omar Govea (to Monterrey)
—	MF	ROU	Robert Dumitru (to Metalul Buzău)

== Pre-season and friendlies ==
Win Draw Loss

7 July 2022 Friendly	Voluntari (Romania)	1–1	(Cyprus) Karmiotissa	Kielce, Poland
18:00 CEST (UTC+2)		Report		Stadium: Stadion Kusocińskiego

26 November 2022 Friendly	Voluntari (Romania)	0–0	(Romania) Petrolul 52	Buftea, Romania
12:00 EET (UTC+2)		Report		Stadium: Baza Sportiva Buftea

7 January 2023 Friendly	Mezőkövesd (Hungary)	1–2	(Romania) Voluntari	Lara, Turkey
15:00 TRT (UTC+3)		Report		Stadium: Titanic Hotel Spor Kompleks

== Competitions ==
=== Overview ===
Competition	First match	Last match	Starting round	Final position	Record							
Competition	First match	Last match	Starting round	Final position	Pld	W	D	L	GF	GA	GD	Win %
Liga I	18 July 2022	13 March 2023	Matchday 1	10th	30	8	10	12	28	32	−4	26.67
Liga I play-out round	17 March 2023	26 May 2023	Matchday 1	European play-off semi-final	10	4	6	0	20	14	+6	40.00
Cupa României	19 October 2022	6 December 2022	Group stage	Group stage	3	1	0	2	1	5	−4	33.33
Total					43	13	16	14	49	51	−2	30.23

Source: Soccerway

=== Liga I ===
==== League table ====
Pos	Team	Pld	W	D	L	GF	GA	GD	Pts	Qualification
8	Petrolul Ploiești	30	11	3	16	28	44	−16	36	Qualification for the Play-out round
9	Universitatea Cluj	30	8	10	12	25	37	−12	34 (Note: Head to head points: Universitatea Cluj 4, Voluntari 1)	Qualification for the Play-out round
10	Voluntari	30	8	10	12	28	32	−4	34	Qualification for the Play-out round
11	Botoșani	30	7	11	12	29	44	−15	32 (Note: Head to head points: Botoșani 6, Chindia 5, Hermannstadt 3)	Qualification for the Play-out round
12	Chindia Târgoviște	30	7	11	12	32	42	−10	32	Qualification for the Play-out round

Source: LPF (in Romanian) Soccerway
Rules for classification: 1) Points; 2) Head-to-head points; 3) Head-to-head goal difference; 4) Head-to-head goals scored; 5) Goal difference; 6) Goals scored; 7) Play-off.

==== Results summary ====
Overall								Home						Away					
Pld	W	D	L	GF	GA	GD	Pts	W	D	L	GF	GA	GD	W	D	L	GF	GA	GD
30	8	10	12	28	32	−4	34	5	4	6	13	11	+2	3	6	6	15	21	−6

Source: Liga 1

==== Results by round ====
Round	1	2	3	4	5	6	7	8	9	10	11	12	13	14	15	16	17	18	19	20	21	22	23	24	25	26	27	28	29	30
Ground	A	H	H	A	H	A	H	A	H	A	H	A	H	A	H	H	A	A	H	A	H	A	H	A	H	A	H	A	H	A
Result	W	L	W	L	D	L	D	L	L	D	W	D	W	D	L	L	W	D	W	D	D	L	L	L	L	L	W	W	D	D
Position																														

Source: Liga 1
A = Away; H = Home; W = Win; D = Draw; L = Loss

==== Matches ====
The league fixtures were announced on 1 July 2022.

12 February 2023 25	Voluntari	1–2	FCSB
--:-- EET (UTC+2)

20 February 2023 26	U Craiova 1948	2–1	Voluntari
--:-- EET (UTC+2)

26 February 2023 27	Voluntari	1–0	Universitatea Craiova
--:-- EET (UTC+2)

1 March 2023 28	Mioveni	0–3	Voluntari
--:-- EET (UTC+2)

6 March 2023 29	Voluntari	0–0	Argeș Pitești
--:-- EET (UTC+2)

13 March 2023 30	Chindia Târgovişte	1–1	Voluntari
--:-- EET (UTC+2)

==== Play-out round ====
Pos	Team	Pld	W	D	L	GF	GA	GD	Pts	Qualification or relegation
7	FCU 1948 Craiova	9	4	4	1	13	7	+6	36	Qualification to European competition play-offs
8	Petrolul Ploiești	9	5	1	3	9	9	0	34	ineligible for european competitions (Note: Petrolul Ploiești failed to obtain a UEFA licence.)
9	Voluntari	9	4	5	0	17	11	+6	34	Qualification to European competition play-offs
10	Universitatea Cluj	9	5	1	3	12	9	+3	33	
11	Hermannstadt	9	4	3	2	10	7	+3	31	
12	Botoșani	9	4	3	2	10	5	+5	31	
13	UTA Arad (O)	9	3	3	3	10	9	+1	26	Qualification for the relegation play-offs
14	Argeș Pitești (R)	9	3	1	5	10	11	−1	24	Qualification for the relegation play-offs
15	Chindia Târgoviște (R)	9	2	1	6	7	12	−5	23	Relegation to Liga II
16	Mioveni (R)	9	0	0	9	1	19	−18	11	Relegation to Liga II

Source: Soccerway, FRF (in Romanian), LPF (in Romanian)
Rules for classification: 1) Points; 2) Points without rounding; 3) Points in the regular season; 4) Goal difference; 5) Goals scored; 6) Play-off (only if needed to decide teams for relegation). (Note: only criteria 4 and 5 are applied to establish the classification during the competition.)
(O) Play-off winners; (R) Relegated
Notes:

17 March 2023 1	Voluntari	1–1	Hermannstadt	Voluntari
17:30 EET (UTC+2)				Stadium: Stadionul Anghel Iordănescu

2 April 2023 2	Argeș Pitești	0–2	Voluntari
--:-- EEST (UTC+3)

8 April 2023 3	Voluntari	1–1	UTA Arad	Voluntari
--:-- EEST (UTC+3)				Stadium: Stadionul Anghel Iordănescu

14 April 2023 4	Universitatea Craiova	3–3	Voluntari
--:-- EEST (UTC+3)

24 April 2023 5	Voluntari	2–2	Petrolul Ploiești	Voluntari
--:-- EEST (UTC+3)				Stadium: Stadionul Anghel Iordănescu

1 May 2023 6	Universitatea Cluj	2–3	Voluntari
--:-- EEST (UTC+3)

5 May 2023 7	Voluntari	2–0	Mioveni	Voluntari
--:-- EEST (UTC+3)				Stadium: Stadionul Anghel Iordănescu

12 May 2023 8	Voluntari	2–0	Botoșani	Voluntari
--:-- EEST (UTC+3)				Stadium: Stadionul Anghel Iordănescu

19 May 2023 9	Chindia Târgoviște	2–2	Voluntari
--:-- EEST (UTC+3)
