= 2022 Cupa României final =

- Event: 2021–22 Cupa României
Sepsi OSK	Voluntari
2	1
- Date: 19 May 2022
- Venue: Rapid-Giulești, Bucharest
- Man of the Match: Marius Ștefănescu
- Referee: Sebastian Colțescu
- Attendance: 8.128
- Weather: Clear

The 2022 Cupa României final was the final match of the 2021–22 Cupa României and the 84th final of the Cupa României, Romania's premier football cup competition. It was played on 19 May 2022 between Sepsi OSK and Voluntari.

Sepsi OSK claimed its first cup after a 2–1 victory in regular time. Marius Ștefănescu scored a double for the Sfântu Gheorghe side, and was thus named Man of the Match. It was the second appearance in the final stage of the competition for both clubs, with Voluntari winning the 2016–17 edition.

The Final was the first notable event hosted by the new Stadionul Rapid-Giulești in Bucharest, which was inaugurated two months prior to the game.

== Route to the final ==
Sepsi Sfântu Gheorghe		Round	Voluntari
Opponent	Results		Opponent	Results
Farul Constanța	1–0 (A)	Last 32	Șomuz Fălticeni	4–1 (A)
FCU Craiova	1–0 (A)	Last 16	FCSB	3–0 forfeit
Chindia Târgoviște	2–1 (A)	Quarter-finals	Buzău	1–0 (A)
Universitatea Craiova	2–1 (H) and 1-0 (A)	Semi-finals	Argeș Pitești	2–0 (H) and 1–0 (A)

== Match ==
19 May 2022
20:30 EEST (UTC+03)

Sepsi Sfântu Gheorghe (1)	2–1	Voluntari (1)
Ștefănescu 22', 38'	Report 1 Report 2	Dumitrescu 90+5' (o.g.)

Rapid-Giulești, Bucharest
Attendance: 8.128
Referee: Sebastian Colțescu

GK	33	(Romania) Roland Niczuly
RB	20	(Romania) Andres Dumitrescu
CB	44	(Romania) Mihai Bălașa
CB	3	(Romania) Bogdan Mitrea (c)
LB	88	(Bulgaria) Radoslav Dimitrov
LCM	6	(Romania) Nicolae Păun
CM	77	(Croatia) Adnan Aganović	(substituted off) 80'
RCM	21	(Romania) Cristian Bărbuț	(substituted off) 71'
RW	14	(Spain) Eder González
CF	9	(Romania) Alexandru Tudorie	(substituted off) 71'
LW	11	(Romania) Marius Ștefănescu	(substituted off) 84'
Substitutes:
GK	12	(Romania) Răzvan Began
LB	27	(Romania) Rareș Ispas
CB	82	(Slovakia) Branislav Niňaj
CM	8	(Romania) Gabriel Vașvari
CM	24	(Romania) István Fülöp	(substituted on) 84'
CM	90	(Romania) Cătălin Golofca	(substituted on) 71'
CF	29	(Moldova) Vitalie Damașcan	(substituted on) 80'
CF	15	(North Macedonia) Stefan Ashkovski
CF	42	(Netherlands) Kevin Luckassen	(substituted on) 71'
Manager:
(Italy) Cristiano Bergodi

GK	71	(Romania) Mihai Popa
CB	30	(Romania) Gabriel Tamaș	(yellow card) 42'
CB	5	(Moldova) Igor Armaș (c)
CB	13	(Romania) Denis Ciobotariu
RM	24	(Portugal) Ricardinho	(substituted off) 64'
CM	18	(Cape Verde) Hélder Tavares	(substituted off) 46'
CM	66	(Czech Republic) Lukas Droppa	(substituted off) 74'
CM	22	(Moldova) Vadim Rață	(yellow card) 59'
LM	6	(Romania) Marius Briceag	(substituted off) 74'
CF	14	(Portugal) Marcelo Lopes	(yellow card) 51'	(substituted off) 86'
CF	77	(Slovakia) Adam Nemec
Substitutes:
GK	12	(Romania) Victor Rîmniceanu
CB	3	(Ivory Coast) Ulrich Meleke
CB	2	(Romania) Cosmin Achim
LB	23	(Romania) Alexandru Vlad	(substituted on) 74'
CM	21	(Romania) Alexandru Ilie
RM	98	(Romania) Cristian Costin	(substituted on) 74'
RW	10	(Romania) George Merloi	(substituted on) 86'
CF	80	(Romania) Lóránd Fülöp	(substituted on) 46'
CF	27	(Ivory Coast) Muhamed Olawale	(yellow card) 90+2'	(substituted on) 64'
Manager:
(Romania) Liviu Ciobotariu

MAN OF THE MATCH

- Marius Ștefănescu

MATCH OFFICIALS

- Assistant referees:
  - Mircea Grigoriu
  - Sebastian Gheorghe
- Fourth official:
  - George Găman
- Additional assistant referees:

MATCH RULES

- 90 minutes.
- Penalty shoot-out if scores still level.
- Nine named substitutes.
- Maximum of five substitutions.
