= 2026–27 FC Voluntari season =

FC Voluntari
2026–27 season
- Manager: Florin Pârvu
- Stadium: Anghel Iordănescu Stadium
- Superliga: Pre-season
- Cupa României: Pre-season

The 2026–27 season is the 17th season in the history of Fotbal Club Voluntari and their first season back in Liga I since 2024. The club will also participate in the Cupa României.

== Transfers ==
=== In ===
Pos.	Player	Transferred from	Fee	Date	Source
DF	(Moldova) Daniel Dumbrăvanu	(Romania) CFR Cluj	Free	1 July 2026	
DF	(Romania) Denis Haruț	(Romania) Sepsi OSK	Free	1 July 2026	
GK	(Slovenia) Metod Jurhar	(Slovenia) Koper	Free	1 July 2026	
DF	(Croatia) Matej Mamić	(Slovenia) Kalcer Radomlje	Free	1 July 2026	
FW	(Romania) Mihai Roman	(Romania) Argeș Pitești	Free	1 July 2026	

=== Out ===
Pos.	Player	Transferred to	Fee	Date	Source
GK	(Romania) Alexandru Maxim	(Romania) FCSB	Loan return	30 June 2026	
FW	(Slovakia) Adam Nemec	Retiring		1 July 2026	

== Pre-season and friendlies ==
The pre-season commenced on 15 June, during which Voluntari will hold a training camp in Croatia, with four friendly matches scheduled.

27 June 2026 Friendly	NK Nafta 1903 (Slovenia)	0–3	(Romania) Voluntari	Slovenia
17:30			Vencu 15'; Gutea 54'; Onișa 80'

30 June 2026 Friendly	Voluntari (Romania)	3–2	(Hungary) Tiszakécskei FC	Croatia
17:00

2 July 2026 Friendly	Varaždin (Croatia)	2–1	(Romania) Voluntari	Croatia
18:00	38'; 78'		76' (o.g.)

11 July 2026 Friendly	Voluntari (Romania)	3–0	(Romania) Farul Constanța
10:30

== Competitions ==
=== Overall record ===
Competition	First match	Last match	Starting round	Record							
Competition	First match	Last match	Starting round	Pld	W	D	L	GF	GA	GD	Win %
Superliga	17 July 2026		Matchday 1	1	0	1	0	2	2	+0	0.00
Cupa României				0	0	0	0	0	0	+0	—
Total				1	0	1	0	2	2	+0	0.00

Source: Competitions

=== Superliga ===
Pos	Team	Pld	W	D	L	GF	GA	GD	Pts	Qualification
10	Oțelul Galați	5	1	3	1	6	6	0	6	Advances to Play-out
11	Sepsi OSK Sfântu Gheorghe	5	1	3	1	2	2	0	6	Advances to Play-out
12	Voluntari	5	1	1	3	4	13	−9	4	Advances to Play-out
13	CFR Cluj	4	1	0	3	7	8	−1	3	Advances to Play-out
14	Botoșani	5	0	3	2	6	8	−2	3	Advances to Play-out

Updated to match(es) played on 17 August 2026. Source: LPF (in Romanian)
Rules for classification: 1) Points; 2) Head-to-head points; 3) Head-to-head goal difference; 4) Head-to-head goals scored; 5) Goal difference; 6) Goals scored; 7) Play-off.

Pos	Team	Pld	W	D	L	GF	GA	GD	Pts	Qualification	1	2	3	4	5	6
1	1	0	0	0	0	0	0	0	0	Qualification to Champions League first qualifying round						
2	2	0	0	0	0	0	0	0	0	Qualification to Conference League second qualifying round						
3	3	0	0	0	0	0	0	0	0	Qualification to European competition play-offs						
4	4	0	0	0	0	0	0	0	0							
5	5	0	0	0	0	0	0	0	0							
6	6	0	0	0	0	0	0	0	0							

Source: LPF (in Romanian)
Rules for classification: 1) Points; 2) Points without rounding; 3) Points in the regular season; 4) Head-to-head points; 5) Head-to-head goal difference; 6) Head-to-head goals scored; 7) Goal difference; 8) Goals scored; 9) Play-off (only if needed to decide champion or teams for UEFA competitions). (Note: only criteria 7 and 8 are applied to establish the classification during the competition.

Pos	Team	Pld	W	D	L	GF	GA	GD	Pts	Qualification or relegation	7	8	9	10	11	12	13	14	15	16
7	7	0	0	0	0	0	0	0	0	Qualification to European competition play-offs										
8	8	0	0	0	0	0	0	0	0	Qualification to European competition play-offs										
9	9	0	0	0	0	0	0	0	0											
10	10	0	0	0	0	0	0	0	0											
11	11	0	0	0	0	0	0	0	0											
12	12	0	0	0	0	0	0	0	0											
13	13	0	0	0	0	0	0	0	0	Qualification to relegation play-offs										
14	14	0	0	0	0	0	0	0	0	Qualification to relegation play-offs										
15	15	0	0	0	0	0	0	0	0	Relegated to Liga II										
16	16	0	0	0	0	0	0	0	0	Relegated to Liga II										

Source: LPF (in Romanian)
Rules for classification: 1) Points; 2) Points without rounding; 3) Points in the regular season; 4) Head-to-head points; 5) Head-to-head goal difference; 6) Head-to-head goals scored; 7) Goal difference; 8) Goals scored; 9) Play-off (only if needed to decide champion or teams for UEFA competitions). (Note: only criteria 7 and 8 are applied to establish the classification during the competition.

==== Results by round ====
Round	1
Ground	H
Result	D
Position	

A = Away; H = Home; W = Win; D = Draw; L = Loss

17 July 2026 1	Voluntari	2–2	Botoșani
18:30	Diarra 15' (o.g.); Merloi 88'		Dumiter 19'; Mitrov 47'
