= Marius Ștefănescu =

Romanian footballer (born 1998)

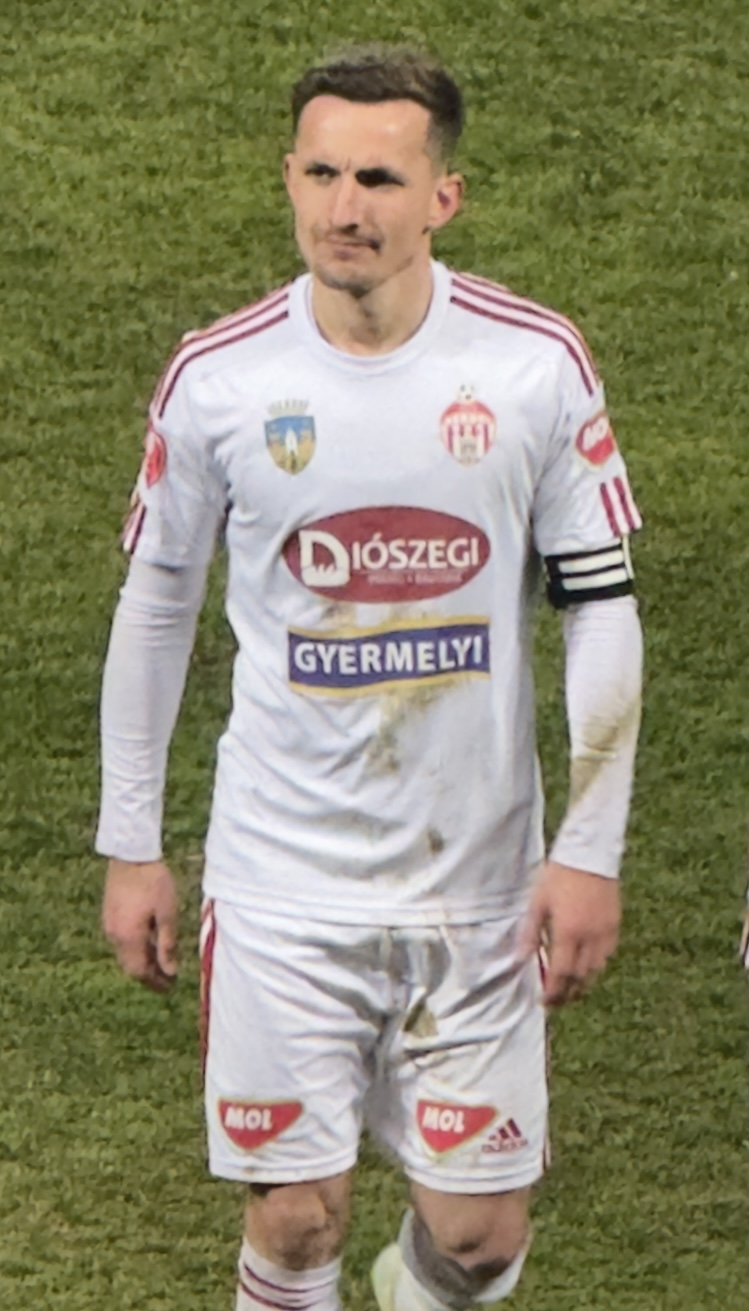
- Ștefănescu with Sepsi OSK in 2024

Personal information
- Date of birth: 14 August 1998 (age 28)
- Place of birth: Caracal, Romania
- Height: 1.73 m (5 ft 8 in)
- Positions: Winger; attacking midfielder

Team information
- Current team: Universitatea Cluj
- Number: 11

Youth career
- 2008–2012: CSȘ Caracal
- 2012–2014: Viitorul Cluj
- 2014–2017: Sepsi OSK

Senior career*
Years	Team	Apps	(Gls)
2017–2024	Sepsi OSK	160	(31)
2017–2019	→ KSE Târgu Secuiesc (loan)	53	(15)
2024–2025	FCSB	27	(3)
2025–2026	Konyaspor	8	(0)
2026–	Universitatea Cluj	12	(1)

International career^{‡}
2022	Romania	2	(0)
- * Club domestic league appearances and goals as of 7 November 2026 ‡ National team caps and goals as of 20 November 2022

Marius Ștefănescu (Romanian pronunciation: [ˈmari.us ʃtefəˈnesku]; born 14 August 1998) is a Romanian professional footballer who plays as a winger or an attacking midfielder for Liga I club Universitatea Cluj.

Ștefănescu spent the first part of his senior career at Sepsi OSK, for which he made his professional debut in 2019, aged 20. He totalled 160 appearances in the top league and aided them in winning four domestic trophies, before transferring to FCSB in 2024.

Internationally, Ștefănescu registered his full debut for Romania in June 2022, in a 3–0 UEFA Nations League loss to Montenegro.

== Club career ==
=== Early career and Sepsi OSK ===
==== 2017–2019: Loan to KSE Târgu Secuiesc ====
Born in Caracal, Ștefănescu joined the academy of Sepsi OSK from Viitorul Cluj, with his former side retaining 50% participation rights in a co-ownership deal. Between 2017 and 2019, he was loaned out to nearby club KSE Târgu Secuiesc, where he registered his debut as a senior in the Liga III championship.

==== 2019–2023: Professional debut and development ====
On 12 July 2019, Ștefănescu played his first Liga I match for Sepsi by coming on as a 65th-minute substitute for István Fülöp in a goalless draw with Voluntari. He scored his first two goals in the competition on 10 December that year, in a 4–0 thrashing of Academica Clinceni.

On 22 July 2020, Ștefănescu started in a 1–0 loss to FCSB in the Cupa României final. He recorded his European debut on 22 July 2021, in a 0–0 away draw with Spartak Trnava counting for the UEFA Europa Conference League second qualifying round. On 31 October, he scored a double in a 4–1 league defeat of Dinamo București.

On 19 May 2022, Ștefănescu aided Sepsi in winning its first trophy after netting twice in the 2–1 win against Voluntari in the Cupa României, and thus ended the season with 12 goals from 42 appearances in all competitions. In May and July 2022, he was consecutively named the Romania Player of the Month by the Gazeta Sporturilor daily. On 21 July that year, he scored his first European goal in a 3–1 defeat of Olimpija Ljubljana in the Europa Conference League second qualifying round.

==== 2023–2024: Transfer saga and best-goalscoring season ====
In the summer of 2023, Ștefănescu was heavily linked with fellow league clubs and rivals Rapid București and FCSB, but nothing came of it. In March 2024, Rapid shareholders Dan Șucu and Victor Angelescu accused Ștefănescu of intentionally getting booked in a match with Petrolul Ploiești (2–1 away win) so he would be suspended against FCSB—they believed Sepsi and FCSB had already agreed on a deal for his transfer the next summer. Sepsi owner László Diószegi responded by stating he would not sell Ștefanescu to FCSB for "not even €10 million".

Ștefănescu ended the 2023–24 season, his last at Sepsi OSK, by scoring a career-best 14 goals from 45 matches in all competitions.

=== FCSB ===
On 14 June 2024, FCSB officially announced the signing of Ștefanescu, with owner Gigi Becali reporting the transfer fee as €1.31 million. He scored on his official debut on 4 July, in a 3–0 win over Corvinul Hunedoara in the Supercupa României, representing his third consecutive success in the competition.

Ștefanescu scored his first league goal for the Roș-albaștrii on 9 August 2024, converting a free kick in a 3–2 home victory over Farul Constanța. On 26 September, he scored in a 4–1 win over RFS in the opening fixture of the Europa League league phase.

== International career ==
Ștefănescu was called up to the Romania national team for the first time by coach Edward Iordănescu on 24 May 2022, for the four opening group games with Montenegro, Bosnia and Herzegovina, and Finland in the UEFA Nations League. He made his debut against the former opponent, starting in the 3–0 away loss on 14 June.

== Style of play ==
Ștefănescu is generally deployed on the left flank in an advanced midfield position or as a winger, but has also played as a full-back on occasion.

== Career statistics ==
=== Club ===
As of match played 7 November 2026

Appearances and goals by club, season and competition
Club	Season	League			National cup (Note: Includes Cupa României, Turkish Cup)		Europe		Other		Total	
Club	Season	Division	Apps	Goals	Apps	Goals	Apps	Goals	Apps	Goals	Apps	Goals
Sepsi OSK	2019–20	Liga I	28	3	6	0	—		—		34	3
Sepsi OSK	2020–21	Liga I	31	0	1	0	—		1 (Note: Appearance in Liga I European play-offs)	0	33	0
Sepsi OSK	2021–22	Liga I	35	8	5	4	2 (Note: Appearances in UEFA Conference League)	0	—		42	12
Sepsi OSK	2022–23	Liga I	30	6	6	1	1	1	1 (Note: Appearances in Supercupa României)	0	38	8
Sepsi OSK	2023–24	Liga I	36	14	2	0	6	0	1	0	45	14
Sepsi OSK	Total		160	31	20	5	9	1	3	0	192	37
KSE Târgu Secuiesc (loan)	2017–18	Liga III	25	5	0	0	—		—		25	5
KSE Târgu Secuiesc (loan)	2018–19	Liga III	28	10	0	0	—		—		28	10
KSE Târgu Secuiesc (loan)	Total		53	15	0	0	—		—		53	15
FCSB	2024–25	Liga I	26	3	3	3	14 (Note: Five appearances in UEFA Champions League, nine appearances and one goal in UEFA Europa League)	1	1	1	44	8
FCSB	2025–26	Liga I	1	0	—		3 (Note: Appearances in UEFA Champions League)	1	1	0	5	1
FCSB	Total		27	3	3	3	17	2	2	1	49	9
Konyaspor	2025–26	Süper Lig	8	0	3	1	—		—		11	1
Universitatea Cluj	2026–27	Liga I	12	1	2	1	4 (Note: Two appearances in UEFA Europa League, two appearances in UEFA Conference League)	0	1	0	19	2
Career total			260	50	28	10	30	3	6	1	324	64

=== International ===
As of match played 20 November 2022

Appearances and goals by national team and year
National team	Year	Apps	Goals
Romania	2022	2	0
Total		2	0

== Honours ==
Sepsi OSK

- Cupa României: 2021–22, 2022–23
- Supercupa României: 2022, 2023

FCSB

- Liga I: 2024–25
- Supercupa României: 2024, 2025

Universitatea Cluj

- Supercupa României runner-up: 2026

Individual

- Gazeta Sporturilor Romania Player of the Month: May 2022, July 2022
