= Matej Mamić (footballer, born 2002) =

Croatian footballer (born 2002)

Personal information
- Date of birth: 9 January 2002 (age 24)
- Place of birth: Zagreb, Croatia
- Height: 1.76 m (5 ft 9 in)
- Position: Right-back

Team information
- Current team: Voluntari
- Number: 23

Youth career
- –2011: Sesvetski Kraljevec
- 2011–2021: Dinamo Zagreb

Senior career*
Years	Team	Apps	(Gls)
2021–2022	Dinamo Zagreb II	20	(0)
2022–2023	Dinamo Zagreb	0	(0)
2022–2023	→ Jarun (loan)	25	(2)
2023–2024	Sesvete	26	(0)
2024–2026	Radomlje	58	(1)
2026–	Voluntari	12	(0)

International career
2016	Croatia U14	3	(0)
2017	Croatia U15	2	(0)
- * Club domestic league appearances and goals as of 2 November 2026

Matej Mamić (born 9 January 2002) is a Croatian professional footballer who plays as a right-back for Liga I club Voluntari.
