= Bogdan Mitache =

Romanian footballer

Personal information
- Full name: Bogdan Adrian Mitache
- Date of birth: 1 January 1994 (age 32)
- Place of birth: Medgidia, Romania
- Height: 1.82 m (6 ft 0 in)
- Position: Defender

Youth career
- 2001–2004: Medgidia
- 2004–2008: Farul Constanța
- 2008–2009: Elpis Constanța
- 2009–2012: Gh. Hagi Football Academy

Senior career*
Years	Team	Apps	(Gls)
2012–2016	Viitorul Constanța	2	(0)
2012–2013	→ Delta Tulcea (loan)	1	(0)
2013–2015	→ Voluntari (loan)	24	(0)
2016	→ Voluntari (loan)	6	(0)
2017–2018	Voluntari	0	(0)
2017–2018	→ Voluntari II	?	(?)
Total		33	(0)
- * Club domestic league appearances and goals as of 18 March 2019

Bogdan Mitache (born 1 January 1994) is a Romanian professional footballer who plays as a defender.

== Honours ==
=== Club ===
Viitorul Constanța

- Liga I: 2016–17
