= Luka Božičković =

Bosnian footballer (born 2003)

Personal information
- Date of birth: 2 September 2003 (age 23)
- Place of birth: Reinbek, Germany
- Height: 1.85 m (6 ft 1 in)
- Position: Central midfielder

Team information
- Current team: Östersunds
- Number: 21

Youth career
- –2017: Wandsbeker TSV Concordia
- 2017–2022: Hamburger SV
- 2022: Maribor

Senior career*
Years	Team	Apps	(Gls)
2021	Hamburger SV II	0	(0)
2022–2023	Maribor	11	(1)
2023–2024	Voluntari	4	(0)
2024	Sloga Meridian	13	(0)
2024–2025	Nafta 1903	32	(0)
2025–2026	Aluminij	2	(0)
2026–	Östersunds	12	(0)

International career
2019	Bosnia and Herzegovina U17	7	(0)
2021	Bosnia and Herzegovina U19	2	(0)
2022–2024	Bosnia and Herzegovina U21	5	(0)
- * Club domestic league appearances and goals as of 11 November 2026

Luka Božičković (born 2 September 2003) is a professional footballer who plays as a midfielder for Superettan club Östersunds. Born in Germany, he represented Bosnia and Herzegovina at youth international level.

== Club career ==
Božičković grew up in Reinbek, Germany, and played youth football with local team Wandsbeker TSV Concordia. Between 2017 and 2022, he played for the Hamburger SV academy, before moving to Slovenian PrvaLiga side Maribor in January 2022. After a brief spell with the Maribor's under-19 team in the second part of the 2021–22 season, Božičković made his league debut for the club on 18 September 2022 in a 5–0 win against Radomlje, where he also scored his first senior goal in the final minutes of the match. In February 2023, he extended his contract with Maribor until the summer of 2025.

== International career ==
Božičković represented Bosnia and Herzegovina at the under-17, under-19, and under-21 level.

== Personal life ==
Božičković has a younger brother, Niko, who is also a footballer and a youth international for Bosnia and Herzegovina.

== Career statistics ==
=== Club ===
As of 1 July 2025

Appearances and goals by club, season and competition
Club	Season	League			National cup (Note: Includes Slovenian Cup, Romanian Cup, Bosnia and Herzegovina Cup)		Continental		Total	
Club	Season	Division	Apps	Goals	Apps	Goals	Apps	Goals	Apps	Goals
Maribor	2022–23	Slovenian PrvaLiga	11	1	5	0	1 (Note: Appearance in UEFA Europa League)	0	17	1
Voluntari	2023–24	Liga I	4	0	1	0	—		5	0
Sloga Meridian	2023–24	Bosnian Premier League	13	0	5	1	—		18	1
Nafta 1903	2024–25	Slovenian PrvaLiga	32	0	2	0	—		34	0
Career total			60	1	13	1	1	0	74	2

== Honours ==
Maribor

- Slovenian Cup runner-up: 2022–23
