= Adrian Ionuț Voicu =

Romanian footballer

Adrian Voicu
Personal information
- Full name: Adrian Ionuț Voicu
- Date of birth: 11 August 1992 (age 34)
- Place of birth: Bucharest, Romania
- Height: 1.82 m (6 ft 0 in)
- Position: Forward

Team information
- Current team: Metaloglobus București
- Number: 19

Youth career
- –2011: Victoria București

Senior career*
Years	Team	Apps	(Gls)
2011–2013	Victoria București		
2013–2018	Voluntari	17	(3)
2017	→ Olimpia Satu Mare (loan)	11	(1)
2018	Daco-Getica București	17	(14)
2019–2020	Turris Turnu Măgurele	33	(9)
2021	FC U Craiova	12	(0)
2021–2023	Concordia Chiajna	29	(7)
2023	1599 Șelimbăr	8	(0)
2023–	Metaloglobus București	10	(1)
- * Club domestic league appearances and goals as of 2 December 2023

Adrian Ionuț Voicu (born 11 August 1992) is a Romanian professional footballer who plays as a forward for Liga II club Metaloglobus București.

== Honours ==
Voluntari

- Liga II: 2014–15
- Liga III: 2013–14
- Supercupa României: 2017

Turris Turnu Măgurele

- Liga III: 2018–19

FC U Craiova

- Liga II: 2020–21
