= Paul Botaș =

Romanian footballer

Personal information
- Full name: Paul Ionel Botaș
- Date of birth: 10 February 1990 (age 36)
- Place of birth: Brăila, Romania
- Height: 1.83 m (6 ft 0 in)
- Position: Goalkeeper

Youth career
- CF Brăila

Senior career*
Years	Team	Apps	(Gls)
2007–2011	CF Brăila	7	(0)
2012–2013	Damila Măciuca	8	(0)
2013–2015	Voluntari	19	(0)
2016	Rapid București	1	(0)
2016	Afumați	5	(0)
2017	Metalul Reșița	7	(0)
2017	Voința Turnu Măgurele	?	(?)
2018	Dacia Unirea Brăila	15	(0)
2018	Daco-Getica București	4	(0)
- * Club domestic league appearances and goals as of 9 March 2019

Paul Ionel Botaș (born 10 February 1990) is a Romanian professional footballer who plays as a goalkeeper.
