= Alexandru Șuteu =

Romanian footballer

Personal information
- Date of birth: 3 March 2004 (age 22)
- Place of birth: Târgu Mureș, Romania
- Height: 1.80 m (5 ft 11 in)
- Position: Left-back

Team information
- Current team: Voluntari
- Number: 30

Youth career
- 2010–2018: ACS Kinder Sângeorgiu de Mureș
- 2018–2021: FCSB

Senior career*
Years	Team	Apps	(Gls)
2018–2023	FCSB II		
2021–2022	→ Unirea Constanța (loan)	33	(1)
2023	→ Gloria Buzău (loan)	9	(0)
2023–2024	FCSB	0	(0)
2023–2024	→ Unirea Dej (loan)	24	(0)
2024–	Voluntari	57	(2)

International career^{‡}
2021	Romania U17	1	(0)
2021–2022	Romania U18	5	(0)
2022	Romania U19	2	(0)
2023–2024	Romania U20	9	(0)
2026	Romania U21	1	(0)
- * Club domestic league appearances and goals as of 2 November 2026 ‡ National team caps and goals as of 6 October 2026

Alexandru Șuteu (born 3 March 2004) is a Romanian professional footballer who plays as a left-back for Liga I club Voluntari.

== Career statistics ==
As of match played 2 November 2026

Appearances and goals by club, season and competition
Club	Season	League			Cupa României		Europe		Other		Total	
Club	Season	Division	Apps	Goals	Apps	Goals	Apps	Goals	Apps	Goals	Apps	Goals
FCSB II	2018–19	Liga III	?	?	—		—		—		?	?
FCSB II	2019–20	Liga III	?	?	—		—		—		?	?
FCSB II	2020–21	Liga III	?	?	—		—		0	0	?	?
FCSB II	Total		?	?	—		—		0	0	?	?
Unirea Constanța (loan)	2021–22	Liga II	18	1	0	0	—		—		18	1
Unirea Constanța (loan)	2022–23	Liga II	15	0	0	0	—		—		15	0
Unirea Constanța (loan)	Total		33	1	0	0	—		—		33	1
Gloria Buzău (loan)	2022–23	Liga II	9	0	—		—		1 (Note: Appearances in Liga I promotion/relegation play-offs)	0	10	0
Unirea Dej (loan)	2023–24	Liga II	24	0	1	0	—		—		25	0
Voluntari	2024–25	Liga II	16	0	1	0	—		0	0	17	0
Voluntari	2025–26	Liga II	27	2	0	0	—		2	0	29	2
Voluntari	2026–27	Liga I	14	0	1	0	—		—		15	0
Voluntari	Total		57	2	2	0	—		2	0	61	2
Career Total			123	3	3	0	—		4	0	130	3
