= Romeo Bunică =

Romanian professional footballer

Personal information
- Date of birth: 11 April 1974 (age 52)
- Place of birth: Râmnicu Sărat, Romania
- Height: 1.90 m (6 ft 3 in)
- Position: Forward

Youth career
- Olimpia Râmnicu Sărat

Senior career*
Years	Team	Apps	(Gls)
1998–2001	Olimpia Râmnicu Sărat		
2001–2003	Gloria Buzău (Note: The statistics for the 2001–02 season are unavailable.)	24	(9)
2003–2005	Otopeni (Note: The statistics for the 2003–04 season are unavailable.)	26	(6)
2006–2007	Gloria Buzău	58	(21)
2008	CSM Râmnicu Sărat		
2008–2009	Petrolul Berca		
Total		108	(36)

Managerial career
- 2007: Gloria Buzău (assistant)
- 2008–2009: Petrolul Berca
- 2010–2011: Voluntari
- 2011–2012: Otopeni
- 2012: Conpet Ploiești
- 2012–2013: Voluntari
- 2013–2016: Gloria Buzău (assistant)
- * Club domestic league appearances and goals as of 14 March 2018

Romeo "Romică" Bunică (born 11 April 1974) is a Romanian former professional footballer who played as a forward.

== Playing career ==
Bunică was born on 11 April 1974 in Râmnicu Sărat, Romania and began playing junior-level football at local club Olimpia. In 1998, he started to play for Olimpia's senior team in Divizia C. Three years later, he joined Gloria Buzău, helping them gain promotion to Divizia B at the end of the 2001–02 season. In 2003, Bunică went back to Divizia C football, signing with Otopeni. He helped them earn promotion to the second league in his first season.

In the middle of the 2005–06 season, Bunică returned to Gloria Buzău. There, during the 2006–07 season, he netted 16 goals that helped his side achieve first league promotion. Subsequently, he made his Liga I debut at age 33, as on 29 July 2007 coach Viorel Ion sent him to replace Marius Șuleap in the 68th minute of a 2–1 home loss to Dinamo București. The most controversial moment of Bunică's career took place on 30 November 2007. On that day Gloria played against Steaua București of which it was seen as its unofficial satellite. Bunică was sent by coach Ștefan Stoica in the second half of the match while the score was 1–0 in favor of Steaua. In the 90+2nd minute, he netted a goal from a free kick and the game ended in a 1–1 draw. Several months later, he was removed from the team, and it was suspected that the owner of Steaua, Gigi Becali, ordered this. Steaua eventually lost the title that season by one point to CFR Cluj. Bunică's last Liga I match took place on 14 December 2007 in Gloria's 4–1 win over Ceahlăul Piatra Neamț, totaling 15 matches with one goal in the competition.

In 2008, Bunică joined his hometown club, CSM Râmnicu Sărat in the third league. Subsequently, he was a player-coach in the same league at Petrolul Berca, ending his career during the 2008–09 season.

== Managerial career ==
Bunică started coaching as an assistant in 2007 at Gloria Buzău, while still active as a player. Subsequently, he was head coach and player for Petrolul Berca during the 2008–09 Liga III season. In the following years, he led several clubs in the Romanian lower leagues such as Voluntari, Otopeni and Conpet Ploiești. From 2013 to 2016, Bunică worked once again as an assistant for Gloria Buzău. In May 2016, Bunică and other coaches and players from Gloria were suspended by the Romanian Football Federation for arranging bets on 10 matches, between September 2014 and May 2015. The Disciplinary Committee sanctioned him with the measure of banning any football-related activity for a period of two years and a sports penalty of 200,000 lei. Afterwards, he coached at junior-level.

== Honours ==
Gloria Buzău

- Divizia C: 2001–02

Otopeni

- Divizia C: 2003–04
