= Mihai Popa =

Romanian footballer (born 2000)

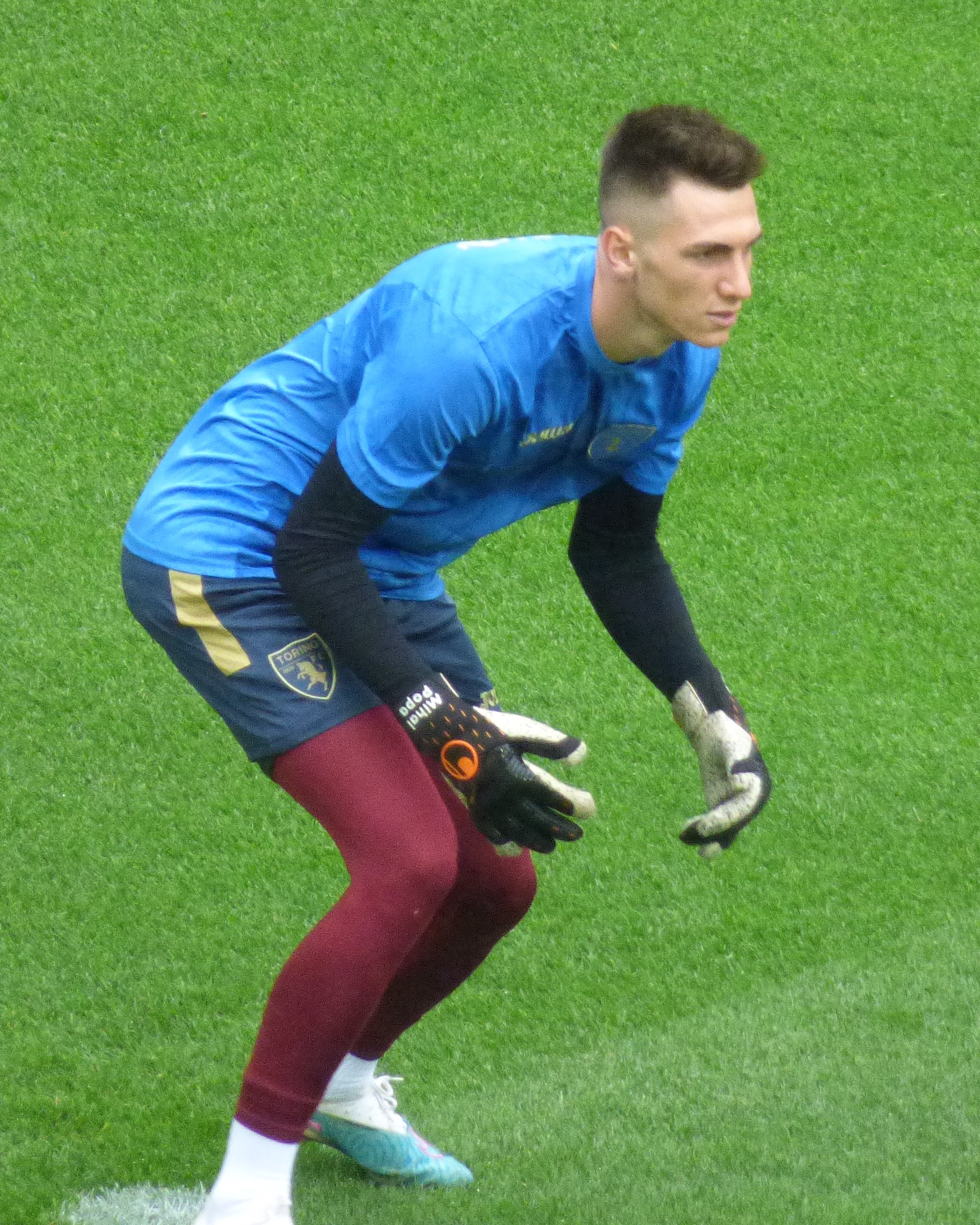
- Popa with Torino in 2023

Personal information
- Full name: Mihai Maximilian Popa
- Date of birth: 12 October 2000 (age 26)
- Place of birth: Constanța, Romania
- Height: 1.90 m (6 ft 3 in)
- Position: Goalkeeper

Team information
- Current team: Motor Lublin
- Number: 71

Youth career
- 2007–2009: Farul Constanța
- 2009–2018: Gheorghe Hagi Academy

Senior career*
Years	Team	Apps	(Gls)
2018–2019	Viitorul Constanța	0	(0)
2018–2019	→ Farul Constanța (loan)	13	(0)
2019–2021	Astra Giurgiu	14	(0)
2020	→ Rapid București (loan)	7	(0)
2021–2023	Voluntari	72	(0)
2023–2026	Torino	0	(0)
2024–2025	→ CFR Cluj (loan)	11	(0)
2026	CFR Cluj	17	(0)
2026–	Motor Lublin	5	(0)

International career
2021–2023	Romania U21	9	(0)
2021	Romania Olympic	2	(0)
- * Club domestic league appearances and goals as of 22 August 2026

Mihai Maximilian Popa (Romanian pronunciation: [miˈhaj ˈpopa]; born 12 October 2000) is a Romanian professional footballer who plays as a goalkeeper for Ekstraklasa club Motor Lublin.

== Club career ==
=== Early career and Farul Constanța ===
Popa started practising youth football with his hometown club Farul Constanța at age seven, and two years later moved to the nearby Gheorghe Hagi Academy. He returned to his former side in 2018, going on to make his senior debut in a 1–0 Liga II win over Viitorul Târgu Jiu on 30 September.

=== Astra Giurgiu ===
Popa joined Liga I team Astra Giurgiu in the summer of 2019, but did not feature in any matches during his first year in the top flight. On 14 February 2020, he was loaned out to Liga II side Rapid București for the remainder of the season.

On 11 July 2020, in a league derby against Petrolul Ploiești, Popa was given two yellow cards and sent off for stepping out of the goal-line twice during a penalty kick; Petrolul missed the subsequent third shot and the game finished goalless.

On 14 November 2020, upon his return to Giurgiu, Popa registered his Liga I debut by starting in a 1–1 draw at Dinamo București. On 22 May 2022, he played the full match as Astra lost 2–3 after extra time to Universitatea Craiova in the Cupa României final. He appeared in 15 games all competitions comprised during the 2020–21 campaign, which ended in relegation for "the Black Devils".

=== Voluntari ===
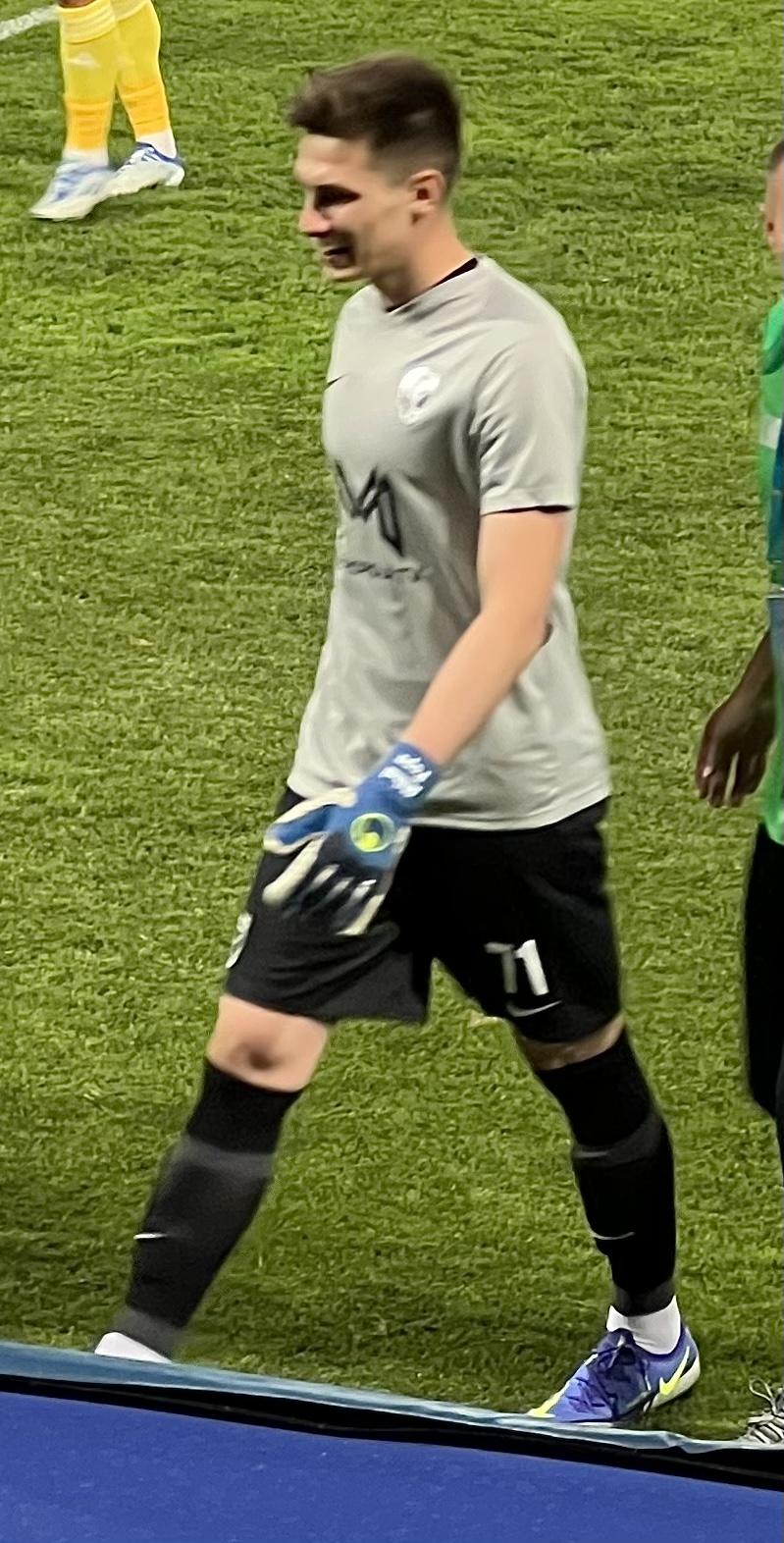
Popa with Voluntari in 2022

On 11 August 2021, Popa was transferred to Voluntari for an undisclosed fee, with Astra Giurgiu reportedly retaining 50% participation rights in a co-ownership deal. On 19 May 2022, he was again runner-up in his second successive Cupa României final after a 1–2 loss to Sepsi OSK.

Three days after the final, the Gazeta Sporturilor daily wrote that five-time defending champions CFR Cluj made a €300,000 offer to sign Popa, but on 17 June 2022 the Voluntari Board of Directors decided that he would not be sold for less than €1 million.

In the 2022–23 season, Popa kept 13 clean sheets, the most in the national league tied with Mihai Aioani.

=== Torino ===
On 8 June 2023, Italian club Torino confirmed the signing of Popa for an undisclosed period.

On 4 August 2024, after failing to record his official debut for Torino, Popa returned to his home country on a one-year loan at CFR Cluj. He made his club and European debut on 22 August, in a 1–0 home win over Pafos in the UEFA Conference League play-off round.

=== Return to CFR Cluj ===
On 22 January 2026, Popa returned to CFR Cluj on a permanent basis.

=== Motor Lublin ===
On 23 June 2026, Popa moved to Polish Ekstraklasa club Motor Lublin on a free transfer, signing a two-year contract.

== International career ==
In June 2021, Popa was part of the Romania squad for the postponed 2020 Summer Olympics. Two years later, he was selected by Romania under-21 for the 2023 UEFA European Championship.

== Personal life ==
Popa's paternal grandfather, Gheorghe, was also a professional footballer. He also played as a goalkeeper for Farul Constanța between 1969 and 1977.

== Career statistics ==
As of match played 22 August 2026

Appearances and goals by club, season and competition
Club	Season	League			National cup (Note: Includes Cupa României)		Europe		Other		Total	
Club	Season	Division	Apps	Goals	Apps	Goals	Apps	Goals	Apps	Goals	Apps	Goals
Farul Constanța (loan)	2018–19	Liga II	13	0	0	0	—		—		13	0
Astra Giurgiu	2019–20	Liga I	0	0	0	0	—		—		0	0
Astra Giurgiu	2020–21	Liga I	13	0	2	0	—		—		15	0
Astra Giurgiu	2021–22	Liga II	1	0	0	0	—		—		1	0
Astra Giurgiu	Total		14	0	2	0	—		—		16	0
Rapid București (loan)	2019–20	Liga II	7	0	0	0	—		—		7	0
Voluntari	2021–22	Liga I	35	0	4	0	—		—		39	0
Voluntari	2022–23	Liga I	37	0	0	0	—		1 (Note: Appearance in Liga I European play-offs)	0	38	0
Voluntari	Total		72	0	4	0	—		1	0	77	0
Torino	2023–24	Serie A	0	0	0	0	—		—		0	0
Torino	2025–26	Serie A	0	0	0	0	—		—		0	0
Torino	Total		0	0	0	0	—		—		0	0
CFR Cluj (loan)	2024–25	Liga I	11	0	0	0	2 (Note: Appearances in UEFA Conference League)	0	—		13	0
CFR Cluj	2025–26	Liga I	17	0	2	0	—		—		19	0
Motor Lublin	2026–27	Ekstraklasa	5	0	0	0	—		—		5	0
Career total			137	0	8	0	2	0	1	0	148	0

== Honours ==
Astra Giurgiu

- Cupa României runner-up: 2020–21

Voluntari

- Cupa României runner-up: 2021–22

CFR Cluj

- Cupa României: 2024–25

Individual

- Liga I Team of the Season: 2021–22
- Liga I most clean sheets: 2022–23 (shared with Marian Aioani)
