= Florin Bălan =

Romanian footballer

Personal information
- Full name: Francis Florin Bălan
- Date of birth: 1 February 2002 (age 24)
- Place of birth: Petrila, Romania
- Height: 1.76 m (5 ft 9 in)
- Position: Midfielder

Team information
- Current team: Agricola Borcea

Youth career
- –2018: Voluntari

Senior career*
Years	Team	Apps	(Gls)
2017–2023	Voluntari II	30	(8)
2019–2023	Voluntari	2	(0)
2020–2021	→ Farul Constanța (loan)	16	(2)
2022	→ Afumați (loan)	10	(1)
2023–2024	Gloria Bistrița	22	(0)
2024–	Agricola Borcea	0	(0)

International career^{‡}
2019–2020	Romania U18	6	(2)
2021	Romania U19	1	(0)
- * Club domestic league appearances and goals as of 13:29, 8 November 2024 (UTC) ‡ National team caps and goals as of 13:18, 13 January 2024 (UTC)

Francis Florin Bălan (born 1 February 2002) is a Romanian professional footballer who plays as a midfielder for Liga III club Agricola Borcea. He made his debut in Liga I on 3 February 2019, in a match between FC Voluntari and Sepsi OSK Sfântu Gheorghe, ended with the score of 4–2.

== Honours ==
=== Afumați ===
- Liga III: 2021–22
