= Nicolae Carnat =

Romanian footballer

Personal information
- Date of birth: 8 April 1998 (age 28)
- Place of birth: Alba Iulia, Romania
- Height: 1.85 m (6 ft 1 in)
- Position: Winger

Team information
- Current team: Concordia Chiajna
- Number: 22

Youth career
- 2006–2009: Unirea Alba Iulia
- 2010–2014: Gheorghe Hagi Academy
- 2014–2017: Wolverhampton Wanderers

Senior career*
Years	Team	Apps	(Gls)
2017–2018	Wolverhampton	0	(0)
2017	→ Esbjerg (loan)	3	(0)
2018	Dunărea Călărași	9	(0)
2019–2020	Sepsi OSK	41	(6)
2020–2022	CFR Cluj	10	(0)
2021–2022	→ Rapid București (loan)	21	(3)
2022–2023	Mioveni	26	(1)
2023	Farul Constanța	4	(1)
2023–2025	Voluntari	59	(7)
2025–	Concordia Chiajna	26	(4)
2026	→ Unirea Slobozia (loan)	7	(0)

International career
2014–2015	Romania U17	3	(0)
2016	Romania U19	2	(0)
2020	Romania U21	1	(0)
- * Club domestic league appearances and goals as of 1 November 2026

Nicolae Carnat (born 8 April 1998) is a Romanian professional footballer who plays as a winger for Liga II club Concordia Chiajna.

== Career statistics ==
As of match played 1 November 2026

Appearances and goals by club, season and competition
Club	Season	League			National cup (Note: Includes Cupa României)		Europe		Other		Total	
Club	Season	Division	Apps	Goals	Apps	Goals	Apps	Goals	Apps	Goals	Apps	Goals
Esbjerg (loan)	2017–18	Danish 1st Division	3	0	0	0	—		—		3	0
Dunărea Călărași	2018–19	Liga I	9	0	1	0	—		—		10	0
Sepsi OSK	2018–19	Liga I	4	0	0	0	—		—		4	0
Sepsi OSK	2019–20	Liga I	33	6	6	2	—		—		39	8
Sepsi OSK	2020–21	Liga I	4	0	0	0	—		—		4	0
Sepsi OSK	Total		41	6	6	2	0	0	0	0	47	8
CFR Cluj	2020–21	Liga I	10	0	1	0	4 (Note: Appearances in UEFA Europa League)	0	0	0	15	0
Rapid București (loan)	2021–22	Liga I	21	3	1	0	—		—		22	3
Mioveni	2022–23	Liga I	26	1	3	1	—		—		29	2
Farul Constanța	2023–24	Liga I	4	1	0	0	1 (Note: Appearance in UEFA Champions League)	0	0	0	5	1
Voluntari	2023–24	Liga I	29	0	4	0	—		—		33	0
Voluntari	2024–25	Liga II	30	7	1	0	—		2 (Note: Appearances in Liga I promotion/relegation play-offs)	0	33	7
Voluntari	Total		59	7	5	0	—		2	0	66	7
Concordia Chiajna	2025–26	Liga II	15	3	2	0	—		—		17	3
Concordia Chiajna	2026–27	Liga II	11	1	3	4	—		—		14	5
Concordia Chiajna	Total		26	4	5	4	—		—		31	8
Unirea Slobozia (loan)	2025–26	Liga I	7	0	—		—		—		7	0
Career total			206	22	22	7	5	0	2	0	235	29

== Honours ==
Sepsi OSK

- Cupa României runner-up: 2019–20

CFR Cluj

- Liga I: 2020–21
- Supercupa României: 2020

Farul Constanța

- Supercupa României runner-up: 2023
