= Andreas Niță =

Romanian professional footballer

Personal information
- Date of birth: 17 December 2003 (age 22)
- Place of birth: Bucharest, Romania
- Height: 1.70 m (5 ft 7 in)
- Position: Right winger

Youth career
- CD Serranos
- Torrent
- –2020: San Jose Valencia
- 2020–2021: CD Don Bosco
- 2021–2022: Paterna

Senior career*
| Years | Team | Apps | (Gls) |
| 2022–2023 | CD San Marcelino | 2 | (0) |
| 2023 | Tunari | | |
| 2023–2025 | Voluntari | 9 | (1) |
| 2025–2026 | FC Bacău | 13 | (0) |

International career
| 2018 | Romania U15 | 2 | (0) |
- * Club domestic league appearances and goals as of 25 April 2026

Andreas Niță (born 17 December 2003) is a Romanian professional footballer who plays as a right winger.

== Club career ==
=== Voluntari ===
He made his Liga I debut for Voluntari against Oțelul Galați on 25 August 2023.

== Personal life ==
Andreas's father, Robert, was also a professional footballer.

== Honours ==
Tunari

- Liga III: 2022–23
