= Andres Dumitrescu =

Romanian footballer (born 2001)

Personal information
- Full name: Andres Mihai Dumitrescu
- Date of birth: 11 March 2001 (age 25)
- Place of birth: Slatina, Romania
- Height: 1.81 m (5 ft 11 in)
- Position: Left-back

Team information
- Current team: Petrolul Ploiești
- Number: 2

Youth career
- 2010–2012: Argeș Pitești
- 2012–2015: Viitorul Argeș
- 2015–2019: Argeș Pitești
- 2019: Padova
- 2019–2020: Lugano

Senior career*
Years	Team	Apps	(Gls)
2020–2023	Sepsi OSK	68	(2)
2023–2026	Slavia Prague	2	(0)
2024	→ Sepsi OSK (loan)	15	(0)
2024–2025	→ Sepsi OSK (loan)	25	(1)
2025	→ Sigma Olomouc (loan)	2	(0)
2026–	Petrolul Ploiești	31	(1)

International career^{‡}
2017–2018	Romania U17	6	(0)
2018	Romania U18	1	(0)
2019	Romania U19	5	(0)
2022–2023	Romania U21	7	(0)
- * Club domestic league appearances and goals as of 6 November 2026 ‡ National team caps and goals as of 28 June 2023

Andres Mihai Dumitrescu (Romanian pronunciation: [dumiˈtresku]; born 11 March 2001) is a Romanian professional footballer who plays as a left-back for Liga I club Petrolul Ploiești.

== Club career ==
=== Early career and Sepsi OSK ===
Born in Slatina, Olt County, Dumitrescu represented Argeș Pitești, Viitorul Pitești, Padova, and Lugano at junior level.

Dumitrescu returned to Romania at Sepsi OSK in January 2020, making his professional debut in a 2–1 Liga I win against Chindia Târgoviște on 23 November that year. On 29 August 2021, he scored his first goal in a 1–1 draw with Botoșani.

On 21 July 2022, Dumitrescu played his first European match in a 3–1 victory over Olimpija Ljubljana in the UEFA Europa Conference League second qualifying round.

=== Slavia Prague ===
On 4 September 2023, Dumitrescu moved to Czech team Slavia Prague on a four-year contract. Sepsi owner László Diószegi reported the transfer fee as €1 million plus 10% interest on a future sale.

== International career ==
On 15 June 2023, Dumitrescu was selected by manager Emil Săndoi in the Romania under-21 squad for the 2023 UEFA European Championship.

== Style of play ==
A left-back, Dumitrescu has cited former Romanian international Cristian Chivu as a point of reference.

== Career statistics ==
=== Club ===
As of match played 6 November 2026

Appearances and goals by club, season and competition
Club	Season	League			National Cup (Note: Includes Cupa României, Czech Cup)		Continental		Other		Total	
Club	Season	Division	Apps	Goals	Apps	Goals	Apps	Goals	Apps	Goals	Apps	Goals
Sepsi OSK	2020–21	Liga I	9	0	1	0	—		0	0	10	0
Sepsi OSK	2021–22	Liga I	25	1	5	0	0	0	0	0	30	1
Sepsi OSK	2022–23	Liga I	30	1	3	0	3 (Note: Appearance(s) in UEFA Europa Conference League)	0	1 (Note: Appearance in Supercupa României)	0	37	1
Sepsi OSK	2023–24	Liga I	4	0	0	0	6	0	1	0	11	0
Sepsi OSK	Total		68	2	9	0	9	0	2	0	88	2
Slavia Prague	2023–24	Czech First League	2	0	1	0	5 (Note: Appearance(s) in UEFA Europa League)	0	—		8	0
Sepsi OSK (loan)	2023–24	Liga I	15	0	0	0	—		—		14	0
Sepsi OSK (loan)	2024–25	Liga I	25	1	1	0	—		—		26	1
Sepsi OSK (loan)	Total		40	1	1	0	—		—		41	1
Sigma Olomouc (loan)	2025–26	Czech First League	2	0	1	0	2 (Note: One appearance in UEFA Europa League, one appearance in UEFA Conference League)	0	—		5	0
Petrolul Ploiești	2025–26	Liga I	16	1	0	0	—		—		16	1
Petrolul Ploiești	2026–27	Liga I	15	0	0	0	—		—		15	0
Petrolul Ploiești	Total		31	1	0	0	—		—		31	1
Career total			143	4	12	0	16	0	2	0	173	4

== Honours ==
Sepsi OSK

- Cupa României: 2021–22, 2022–23
- Supercupa României: 2022, 2023
