= Ianis Vencu =

Romanian footballer

Personal information
- Date of birth: 12 November 2006 (age 19)
- Place of birth: Bucharest, Romania
- Height: 1.82 m (6 ft 0 in)
- Position: Forward

Team information
- Current team: Voluntari
- Number: 99

Youth career
- LPS Mircea Eliade București
- –2024: FCSB

Senior career*
Years	Team	Apps	(Gls)
2024–2025	FCSB	0	(0)
2024	→ Mioveni (loan)	15	(1)
2025	→ Gloria Bistrița-Năsăud (loan)		
2025–	Voluntari	10	(2)
- * Club domestic league appearances and goals as of 2 November 2026

Ianis Vencu (born 12 November 2006) is a Romanian professional footballer who plays as a forward for Liga I club Voluntari.

== Honours ==
Gloria Bistrița

- Liga III: 2024–25
