= Andrei Dima =

Romanian footballer (born 2006)

Personal information
- Full name: Andrei Răzvan Dima
- Date of birth: 8 February 2006 (age 20)
- Place of birth: Bucharest, Romania
- Height: 1.70 m (5 ft 7 in)
- Position: Attacking midfielder

Team information
- Current team: CSM Reșița
- Number: 8

Youth career
- –2021: Prosport Academy
- 2021–2022: Academica Clinceni
- 2022–2023: Rapid București
- 2023–2024: Voluntari

Senior career*
Years	Team	Apps	(Gls)
2021–2022	Academica Clinceni	11	(0)
2023–2024	Voluntari	0	(0)
2024–2025	Argeș Pitești	5	(0)
2025	Concordia Chiajna	10	(0)
2025–2026	Afumați	6	(0)
2026–	CSM Reșița	6	(0)

International career
2021–2022	Romania U16	9	(3)
2022	Romania U17	4	(0)
- * Club domestic league appearances and goals as of 15 September 2026

Andrei Răzvan Dima (born 8 February 2006) is a Romanian professional footballer who plays as an attacking midfielder for Liga II club CSM Reșița.
