= Robert Popescu =

Romanian footballer (born 2003)

Personal information
- Full name: Robert Marian Popescu
- Date of birth: 9 March 2003 (age 23)
- Place of birth: Craiova, Romania
- Height: 1.89 m (6 ft 2 in)
- Positions: Left winger; forward

Team information
- Current team: Argeș Pitești

Youth career
- –2018: CSȘ Craiova
- 2018–2022: FCSB

Senior career*
Years	Team	Apps	(Gls)
2020–2022	FCSB II		
2022–2023	Voluntari II		
2022–2025	Voluntari	28	(3)
2024–2025	→ Hermannstadt (loan)	26	(1)
2025–	Argeș Pitești	2	(0)
2026	→ CSA Steaua București (loan)	10	(0)
- * Club domestic league appearances and goals as of 16 May 2026

Robert Marian Popescu (born 9 March 2003) is a Romanian professional footballer who plays as a left winger or a forward for Liga I club Argeș Pitești.

== Career statistics ==
=== Club ===
As of match played 16 May 2026

Club	Season	League			Cupa României		Europe		Other		Total	
Club	Season	Division	Apps	Goals	Apps	Goals	Apps	Goals	Apps	Goals	Apps	Goals
FCSB II	2020–21	Liga III	?	?	–		–		–		?	?
FCSB II	2021–22	Liga III	?	?	–		–		–		?	?
FCSB II	Total		?	?	–		–		–		?	?
Voluntari II	2022–23	Liga III	?	?	–		–		–		?	?
Voluntari	2022–23	Liga I	2	0	1	0	–		0	0	3	0
Voluntari	2023–24	Liga I	26	3	2	0	–		–		28	3
Voluntari	Total		28	3	3	0	–		0	0	31	3
Hermannstadt (loan)	2024–25	Liga I	26	1	7	2	–		–		33	3
Argeș Pitești	2025–26	Liga I	2	0	1	0	–		–		3	0
CSA Steaua București (loan)	2025–26	Liga II	10	0	–		–		–		10	0
Career total			66	4	11	2	–		0	0	77	6

== Honours ==
Hermannstadt

- Cupa României runner-up: 2024–25
