= Vadim Rață =

Moldovan professional footballer

Personal information
- Date of birth: 5 May 1993 (age 33)
- Place of birth: Chișinău, Moldova
- Height: 1.73 m (5 ft 8 in)
- Position: Midfielder

Team information
- Current team: Argeș Pitești
- Number: 22

Youth career
- –2010: Sheriff Tiraspol

Senior career*
Years	Team	Apps	(Gls)
2010–2013	Sheriff-2 Tiraspol	34	(2)
2010–2016	Sheriff Tiraspol	48	(2)
2013–2015	→ Tiraspol (loan)	41	(2)
2015	→ Zaria Bălți (loan)	15	(2)
2016	→ Speranța Nisporeni (loan)	7	(0)
2016–2017	Zaria Bălți	43	(5)
2018	Milsami Orhei	27	(3)
2019–2021	Chindia Târgoviște	83	(4)
2021–2022	Voluntari	42	(8)
2022	FCSB	2	(0)
2022–2024	Voluntari	65	(4)
2024–2025	Universitatea Cluj	22	(0)
2025–	Argeș Pitești	49	(0)

International career^{‡}
2009–2010	Moldova U17	3	(0)
2011–2012	Moldova U19	9	(2)
2013–2014	Moldova U21	24	(0)
2015–	Moldova	69	(3)
- * Club domestic league appearances and goals as of 6 November 2026 ‡ National team caps and goals as of 16 November 2026

Vadim Rață (born 5 May 1993) is a Moldovan professional footballer who plays as a midfielder for Liga I club Argeș Pitești and the Moldova national team.

== Club career ==
=== FCSB ===
On 12 August 2022, Rață joined Romanian Liga I club FCSB.

=== Return to Voluntari ===
On 6 September 2022, just after 3 games played for FCSB, Rață returned to Voluntari, agreeing to a three-year deal.

== International career ==
Rață made his debut for the Moldova national team on 14 February 2015, being replaced by Alexandru Onică at half time in a 1–2 friendly loss to Romania B in Aksu, Kazakhstan.

== Career statistics ==
=== Club ===
As of match played 6 November 2026

Appearances and goals by club, season and competition
Club	Season	League			National cup (Note: Includes Cupa Moldovei, Cupa României)		Europe		Other		Total	
Club	Season	Division	Apps	Goals	Apps	Goals	Apps	Goals	Apps	Goals	Apps	Goals
Sheriff Tiraspol	2010–11	Divizia Națională	13	0	0	0	—		—		13	0
Sheriff Tiraspol	2011–12	Divizia Națională	25	1	0	0	1 (Note: Appearance(s) in UEFA Europa League)	0	—		26	1
Sheriff Tiraspol	2012–13	Divizia Națională	10	1	2	0	—		—		12	1
Sheriff Tiraspol	Total		48	2	2	0	1	0	—		51	2
Tiraspol (loan)	2013–14	Divizia Națională	25	2	1	0	0	0	—		26	2
Tiraspol (loan)	2014–15	Divizia Națională	16	0	1	0	1	0	—		18	0
Tiraspol (loan)	Total		41	2	2	0	1	0	—		44	2
Zaria Bălți (loan)	2015–16	Divizia Națională	15	2	0	0	—		—		15	2
Speranța Nisporeni (loan)	2015–16	Divizia Națională	7	0	—		—		—		7	0
Zaria Bălți	2016–17	Divizia Națională	25	4	0	0	1	0	1 (Note: Appearance in Moldovan Super Cup)	0	27	4
Zaria Bălți	2017	Divizia Națională	18	1	3	0	4	0	—		25	1
Zaria Bălți	Total		43	5	3	0	5	0	1	0	52	5
Milsami Orhei	2018	Divizia Națională	27	3	0	0	1	0	—		28	3
Chindia Târgoviște	2018–19	Liga II	15	1	—		—		—		15	1
Chindia Târgoviște	2019–20	Liga I	32	2	1	0	—		2 (Note: Appearance in Liga I promotion/relegation play-offs)	0	35	2
Chindia Târgoviște	2020–21	Liga I	36	0	2	0	—		1 (Note: Appearance in Liga I European play-offs)	1	39	1
Chindia Târgoviște	Total		84	5	3	0	—		3	1	89	5
Voluntari	2021–22	Liga I	38	8	5	1	—		—		43	9
Voluntari	2022–23	Liga I	4	0	—		—		—		4	0
Voluntari	Total		42	8	5	1	—		—		47	9
FCSB	2022–23	Liga I	2	0	—		1 (Note: Appearance in UEFA Europa Conference League)	0	—		3	0
Voluntari	2022–23	Liga I	29	1	3	1	—		1	0	37	2
Voluntari	2023–24	Liga I	36	1	4	0	—		—		40	1
Voluntari	Total		65	2	7	1	—		1	0	73	3
Universitatea Cluj	2024–25	Liga I	22	0	1	0	—		—		23	0
Argeș Pitești	2025–26	Liga I	35	0	6	1	—		—		41	1
Argeș Pitești	2026–27	Liga I	14	0	1	0	—		—		15	0
Argeș Pitești	Total		49	0	7	1	—		—		56	1
Career total			445	28	30	3	9	0	5	1	489	32

=== International ===
As of match played 16 November 2026

Appearances and goals by national team and year
National team	Year	Apps	Goals
Moldova	2015	3	0
Moldova	2018	1	0
Moldova	2019	2	1
Moldova	2020	9	0
Moldova	2021	10	0
Moldova	2022	9	0
Moldova	2023	9	1
Moldova	2024	10	1
Moldova	2025	8	0
Moldova	2026	8	0
Total		69	3

Scores and results list Moldova's goal tally first, score column indicates score after each Rață goal.

List of international goals scored by Vadim Rață
No.	Date	Venue	Opponent	Score	Result	Competition
1	14 November 2019	Stade de France, Saint-Denis, France	France	1–0	1–2	UEFA Euro 2020 qualifying
2	10 September 2023	Tórsvøllur, Tórshavn, Faroe Islands	Faroe Islands	1–0	1–0	UEFA Euro 2024 qualifying
3	10 September 2024	Zimbru Stadium, Chișinău, Moldova	San Marino	1–0	1–0	Friendly

== Honours ==
Sheriff Tiraspol

- Divizia Națională: 2011–12, 2012–13

Zaria Bălți

- Cupa Moldovei runner-up: 2016–17
- Supercupa Moldovei runner-up: 2016

Milsami Orhei

- Cupa Moldovei: 2017–18

Chindia Târgoviște

- Liga II: 2018–19

Voluntari

- Cupa României runner-up: 2021–22
