= Octavian Vâlceanu =

Romanian footballer (born 1996)

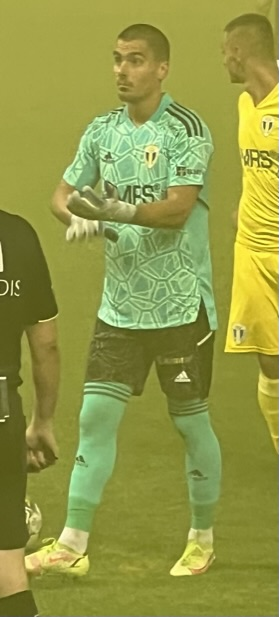
- Vâlceanu with Petrolul Ploiești in 2022

Personal information
- Full name: Octavian Gabriel Vâlceanu
- Date of birth: 13 October 1996 (age 30)
- Place of birth: Bucharest, Romania
- Height: 1.87 m (6 ft 2 in)
- Position: Goalkeeper

Team information
- Current team: CFR Cluj
- Number: 31

Youth career
- 2008–2013: Sportul Studențesc

Senior career*
| Years | Team | Apps | (Gls) |
| 2012–2013 | Sportul Studențesc | 8 | (0) |
| 2013–2014 | Juniorul București | | |
| 2014–2021 | Viitorul Domnești | 86 | (0) |
| 2018–2021 | → Academica Clinceni (loan) | 91 | (0) |
| 2021–2022 | Gaz Metan Mediaș | 23 | (0) |
| 2022–2024 | Voluntari | 13 | (0) |
| 2022–2023 | → Petrolul Ploiești (loan) | 26 | (0) |
| 2024–2025 | Concordia Chiajna | 16 | (0) |
| 2025– | CFR Cluj | 17 | (0) |
- * Club domestic league appearances and goals as of 31 October 2026

Octavian Gabriel Vâlceanu (born 13 October 1996) is a Romanian professional footballer who plays as a goalkeeper for Liga I club CFR Cluj.

== Career statistics ==
As of match played 31 October 2026

| Club | Season | League | | | Cupa României | | Europe | | Other | | Total | |
| Club | Season | Division | Apps | Goals | Apps | Goals | Apps | Goals | Apps | Goals | Apps | Goals |
|---|---|---|---|---|---|---|---|---|---|---|---|---|
| Sportul Studențesc | 2012–13 | Liga II | 8 | 0 | 0 | 0 | – | | – | | 8 | 0 |
| Juniorul București | 2013–14 | Liga IV | ? | ? | ? | ? | – | | – | | ? | ? |
| Viitorul Domnești | 2014–15 | Liga III | ? | ? | ? | ? | – | | – | | ? | ? |
| Viitorul Domnești | 2015–16 | Liga III | ? | ? | ? | ? | – | | – | | ? | ? |
| Viitorul Domnești | 2016–17 | Liga III | ? | ? | ? | ? | – | | – | | ? | ? |
| Viitorul Domnești | 2018–19 | Liga III | ? | ? | ? | ? | – | | – | | ? | ? |
| Viitorul Domnești | Total | | 86 | 0 | ? | ? | – | | – | | 86 | 0 |
| Academica Clinceni (loan) | 2017–18 | Liga II | 3 | 0 | – | | – | | – | | 3 | 0 |
| Academica Clinceni (loan) | 2018–19 | Liga II | 28 | 0 | 0 | 0 | – | | – | | 28 | 0 |
| Academica Clinceni (loan) | 2019–20 | Liga I | 28 | 0 | 1 | 0 | – | | – | | 29 | 0 |
| Academica Clinceni (loan) | 2020–21 | Liga I | 32 | 0 | 0 | 0 | – | | – | | 32 | 0 |
| Academica Clinceni (loan) | Total | | 91 | 0 | 1 | 0 | – | | – | | 92 | 0 |
| Gaz Metan Mediaș | 2021–22 | Liga I | 23 | 0 | 0 | 0 | – | | – | | 23 | 0 |
| Petrolul Ploiești (loan) | 2022–23 | Liga I | 26 | 0 | 0 | 0 | – | | – | | 26 | 0 |
| Voluntari | 2023–24 | Liga I | 13 | 0 | 2 | 0 | – | | – | | 15 | 0 |
| Concordia Chiajna | 2024–25 | Liga II | 16 | 0 | 1 | 0 | – | | – | | 17 | 0 |
| CFR Cluj | 2025–26 | Liga I | 3 | 0 | 2 | 0 | – | | – | | 5 | 0 |
| CFR Cluj | 2026–27 | Liga I | 14 | 0 | 2 | 0 | 4 (Note: Appearance in UEFA Conference League) | 0 | – | | 20 | 0 |
| CFR Cluj | Total | | 17 | 0 | 4 | 0 | 4 | 0 | – | | 25 | 0 |
| Career total | | | 280 | 0 | 8 | 0 | 4 | 0 | – | | 292 | 0 |
