= Rapid-Giulești Stadium =

Football stadium in Romania

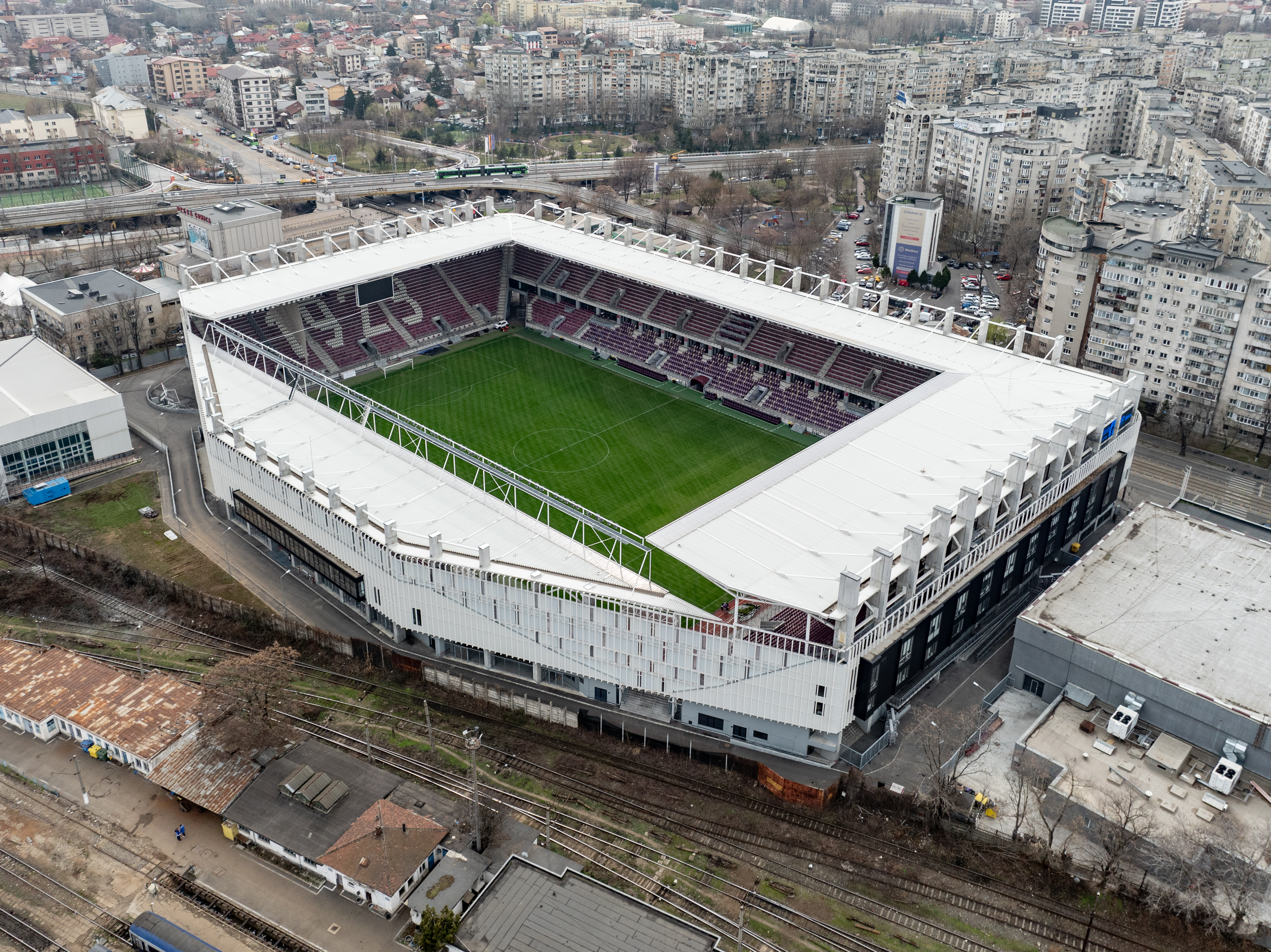
- UEFA
- Interactive map of Rapid-Giulești Stadium
- Address: 18 Giulești Way, Sector 6
- Location: Giulești, Bucharest
- Coordinates: 44°27′21.8″N 26°03′24.8″E
- Owner: Ministry of Transport
- Capacity: 14,047
- Type: Football-specific stadium
- Surface: Grass

Construction
- Groundbreaking: 26 February 2019
- Opened: 26 March 2022
- Cost: €67 million
- Architect: Construcții Erbașu
- General contractor: CNI

Tenant
- Rapid București (2022–present)

The Rapid-Giulești Stadium, known as Superbet Arena-Giulești for sponsorship reasons, is a football-specific stadium located in the Giulești neighbourhood of Bucharest, Romania. It has been home to Liga I club Rapid București since its opening in March 2022, and has a capacity of 14,047 people.

Rapid-Giulești cost €67 million and replaced the original Giulești-Valentin Stănescu Stadium. It hosted the 2022 Cupa României Final.

In November 2022, the naming rights of the stadium were sold to betting company Superbet for a period of five years.

== Events ==
=== Association football ===
International football matches
Date	Competition	Home	Away	Score	Attendance
11 June 2022	2022 UEFA Nations League	Romania	Finland	1–0	11,503
14 June 2022	2022 UEFA Nations League	Romania	Montenegro	0–3	13,600
26 September 2022	2022 UEFA Nations League	Romania	Bosnia and Herzegovina	4–1	12,693
International football matches (U21 level)
Date	Competition	Home	Away	Score	Attendance
21 June 2023	2023 European U21 Championship	Ukraine	Croatia	2–0	1,677
24 June 2023	2023 European U21 Championship	Spain	Croatia	1–0	2,921
27 June 2023	2023 European U21 Championship	Spain	Ukraine	2–2	2,027

== Gallery ==
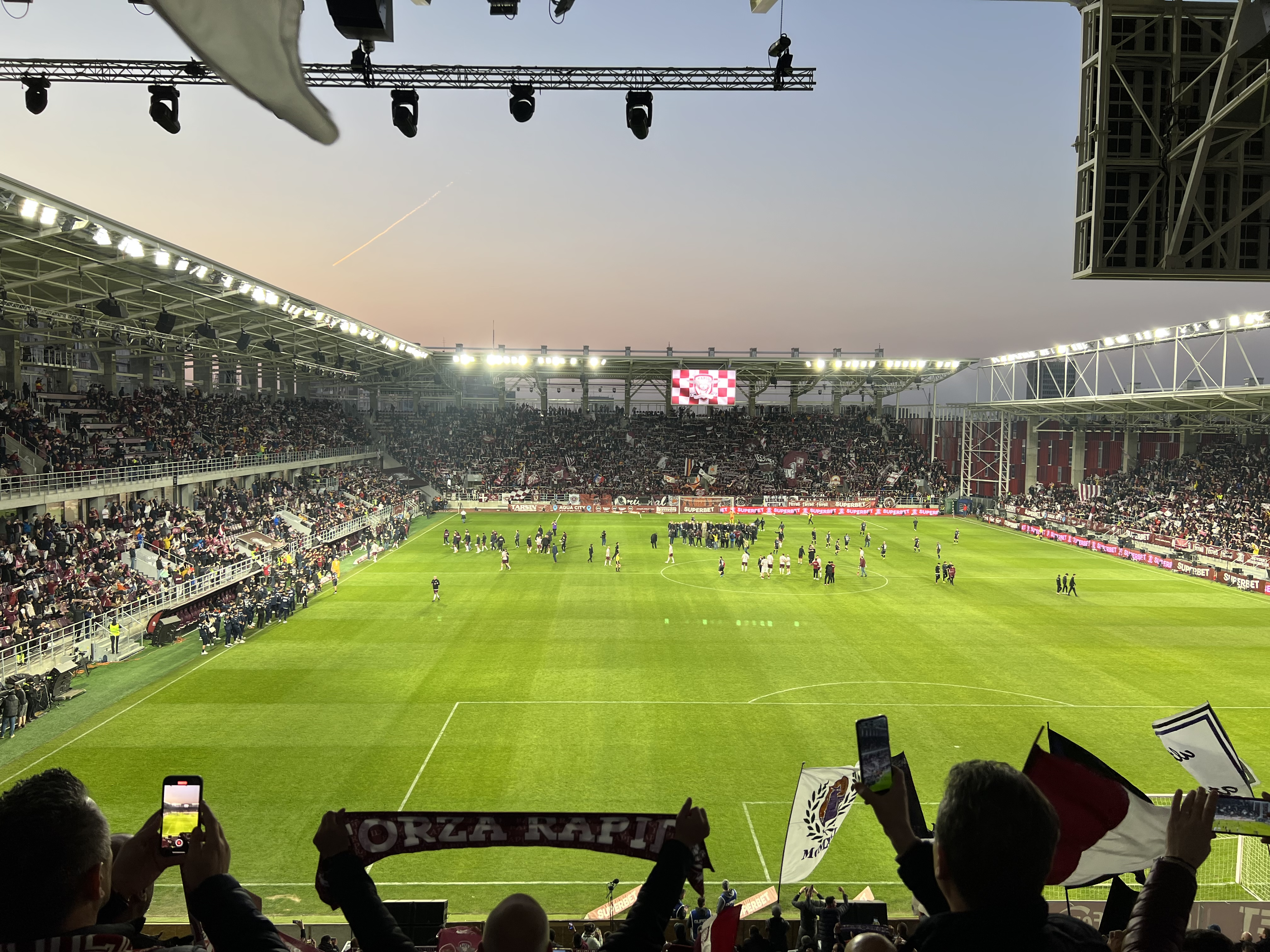
The stadium during the home opener

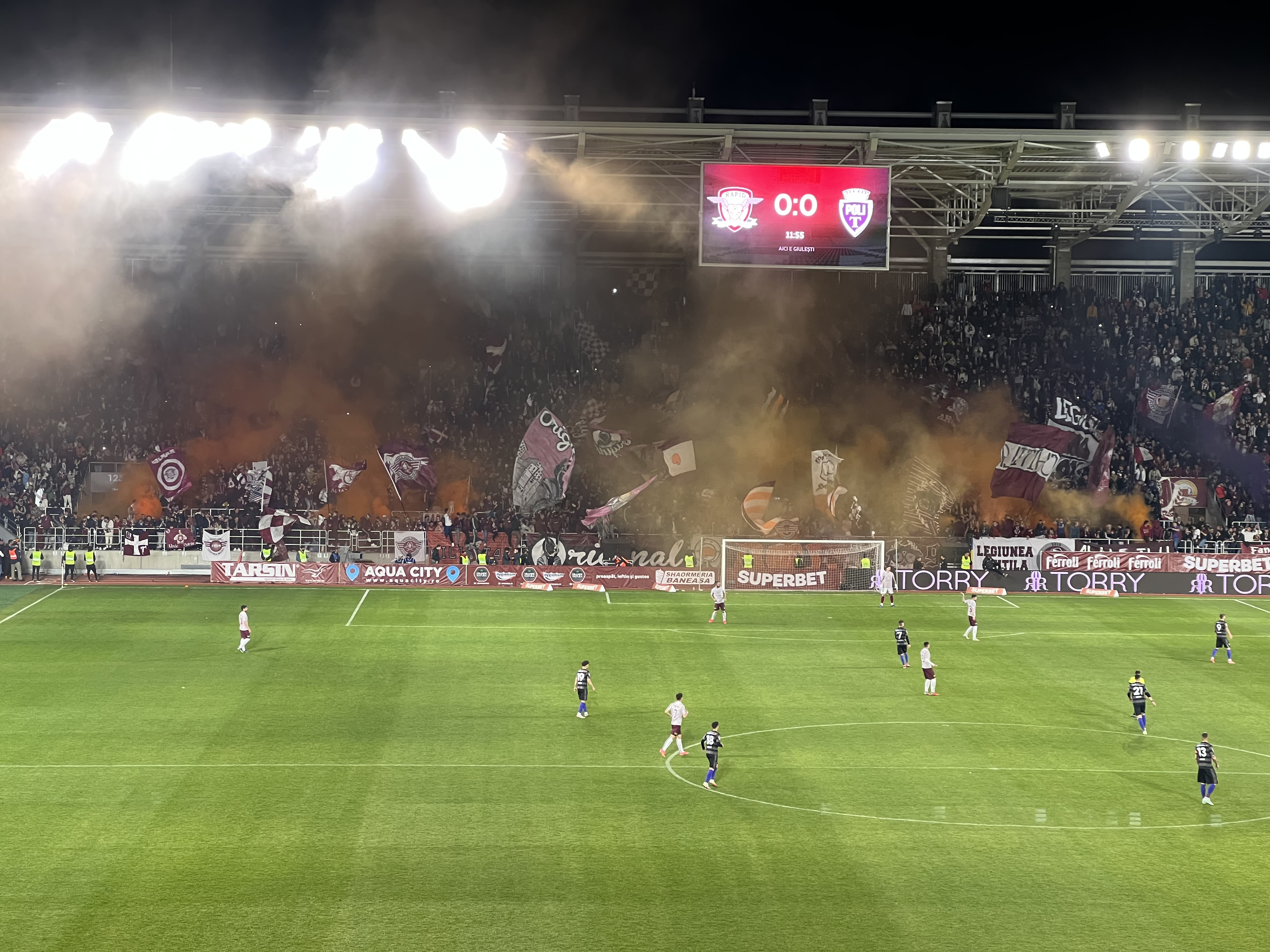
The stadium during the home opener

== See also ==
- Arena Națională
- Steaua Stadium
- Stadionul Arcul de Triumf
- List of football stadiums in Romania
- List of European stadia by capacity
