= Roberto Voican =

Romanian professional footballer

Personal information
- Full name: Roberto Niculae Voican
- Date of birth: 6 February 2003 (age 23)
- Place of birth: Bucharest, Romania
- Height: 1.81 m (5 ft 11 in)
- Position: Midfielder

Youth career
- –2022: Voluntari

Senior career*
Years	Team	Apps	(Gls)
2022–2024	Voluntari	12	(0)

International career^{‡}
2023	Romania U20	1	(0)
- * Club domestic league appearances and goals as of 9 December 2023 ‡ National team caps and goals as of 23 March 2023

Roberto Niculae Voican (born 6 February 2003) is a Romanian professional footballer who plays as a midfielder.
