= Doru Andrei =

Romanian professional footballer

Personal information
- Full name: Doru Cristian Andrei
- Date of birth: 3 February 2003 (age 23)
- Place of birth: Timișoara, Romania
- Height: 1.76 m (5 ft 9 in)
- Position: Midfielder

Team information
- Current team: Sepsi OSK
- Number: 17

Youth career
- –2019: Comprest GIM București

Senior career*
Years	Team	Apps	(Gls)
2019–2020	Comprest GIM București		
2020–2022	ASU Politehnica Timișoara	34	(2)
2022–2026	Voluntari	85	(11)
2026–	Sepsi OSK	14	(2)

International career^{‡}
2021–2022	Romania U19	13	(0)
2022–2024	Romania U20	8	(1)
- * Club domestic league appearances and goals as of 8 November 2026 ‡ National team caps and goals as of 26 March 2024

Doru Cristian Andrei (born 3 February 2003) is a Romanian professional footballer who plays as a midfielder for Liga I club Sepsi OSK.

== Career statistics ==
As of match played 8 November 2026

Appearances and goals by club, season and competition
Club	Season	League			Cupa României		Europe		Other		Total	
Club	Season	Division	Apps	Goals	Apps	Goals	Apps	Goals	Apps	Goals	Apps	Goals
Comprest GIM București	2019–20	Liga IV	?	?	—		—		—		?	?
ASU Politehnica Timișoara	2020–21	Liga II	7	0	1	0	—		—		8	0
ASU Politehnica Timișoara	2021–22	Liga II	27	2	2	0	—		—		29	2
ASU Politehnica Timișoara	Total		34	2	3	0	—		—		37	2
Voluntari	2022–23	Liga I	2	0	2	0	—		0	0	4	0
Voluntari	2023–24	Liga I	33	2	4	1	—		—		37	3
Voluntari	2024–25	Liga II	23	5	1	0	—		—		24	5
Voluntari	2025–26	Liga II	27	4	1	0	—		2 (Note: Appearance in Liga I promotion/relegation play-offs)	0	30	4
Voluntari	Total		85	11	8	0	—		2	0	95	11
Sepsi OSK	2026–27	Liga I	14	2	1	0	—		—		15	2
Career total			133	15	12	0	—		2	0	147	15
