= 2021–22 Cupa României =

Cupa României 2021–22
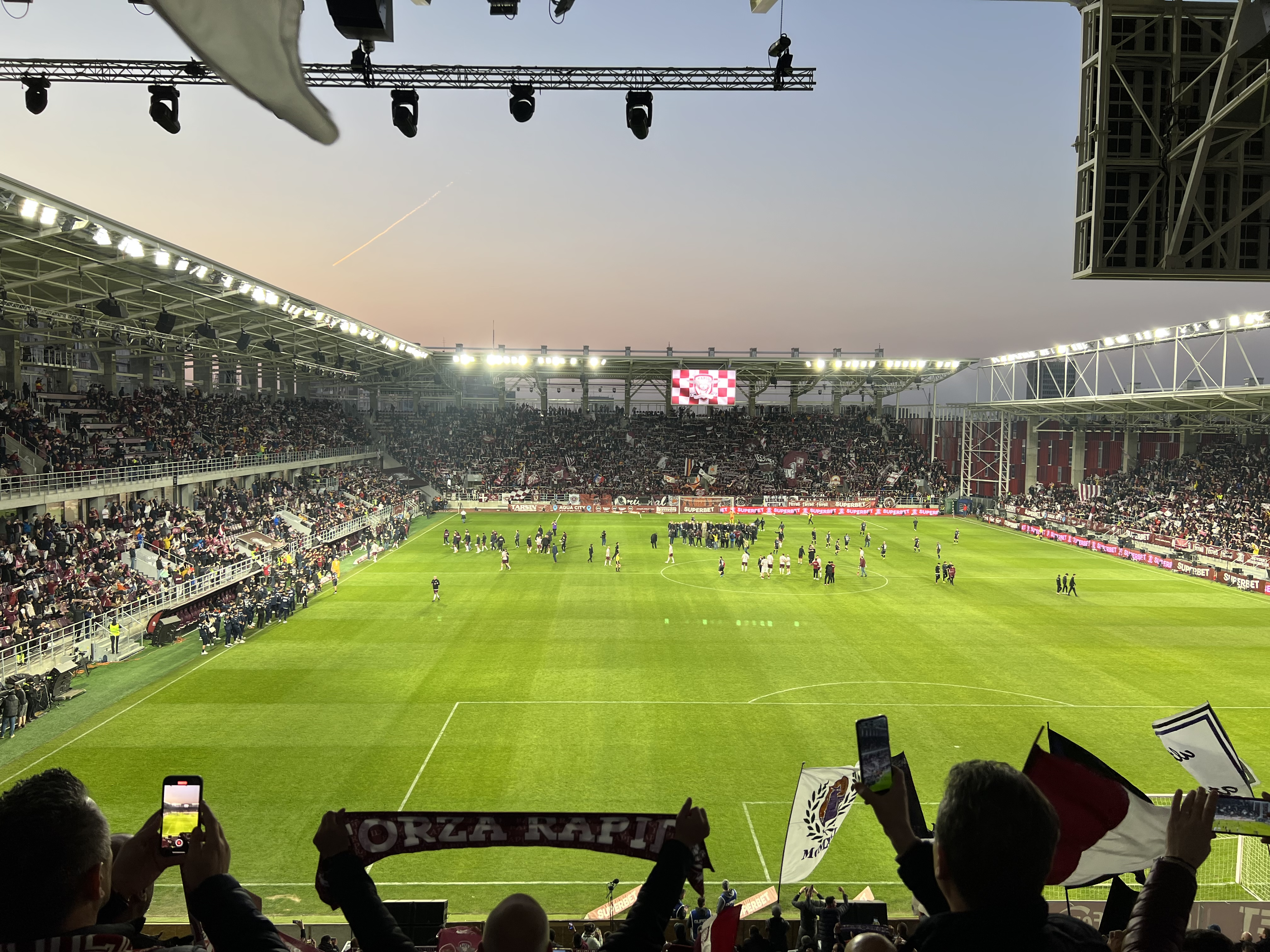

Tournament details
- Country: Romania

Final positions
- Champions: Sepsi OSK
- Runners-up: Voluntari
- Conference League: Sepsi OSK

The 2021–22 Cupa României was the 84th season of the annual Romanian primary football knockout tournament. The winner qualified for the second qualifying round of the 2022–23 UEFA Europa Conference League. Times up to 30 October 2021 and from 26 March 2022 are EEST (UTC+3). Times between 31 October 2021 and 27 March 2022 are EET (UTC+2).

== Round and draw dates ==
Round	Draw date	First match date
First Round	21 July 2021	28 July 2021
Second Round	2 August 2021	11 August 2021
Third Round	18 August 2021	24 August 2021
Fourth Round	30 August 2021	7 September 2021
Round of 32	9 September 2021	21 September 2021
Round of 16	5 October 2021	26 October 2021
Quarter-finals	8 November	1 December 2021
Semi-finals	24 February	20 April 2022 / 11 May 2022
Final	–	19 May 2022

== Round of 32 ==
The matches were played on 21, 22 and 23 September 2021.

Team 1	Score	Team 2
21 September 2021
Șomuz Fălticeni (3)	1–4	Voluntari (1)
Minaur Baia Mare (3)	3–1	Politehnica Iași (2)
Petrolul Ploiești (2)	0–1	FCU Craiova (1)
Mioveni (1)	0–0 (a.e.t.) (4–5 p)	Rapid București (1)
22 September 2021
Argeș Pitești (1)	0–0 (a.e.t.) (4–2 p)	Botoșani (1)
Slatina (3)	1–2	Dunărea Călărași (2)
Miercurea Ciuc (2)	0–1	Chindia Târgoviște (1)
Unirea Slobozia (2)	0–1	Politehnica Timișoara (2)
Concordia Chiajna (2)	0–1	Gaz Metan Mediaș (1)
Buzău (2)	2–1	Academica Clinceni (1)
Club Atletic Oradea (3)	0–1	Hermannstadt (2)
Farul Constanța (1)	0–1	Sepsi OSK (1)
Hunedoara (3)	3–5 (a.e.t.)	FCSB (1)
23 September 2021
Filiași (3)	1–0	UTA Arad (1)
Ripensia Timişoara (2)	0–1	Dinamo București (1)
Universitatea Craiova (1)	1–0	CFR Cluj (1)

== Round of 16 ==
The matches were played on 26, 27 and 28 October 2021.

Team 1	Score	Team 2
26 October 2021
Hermannstadt (2)	2–2 (a.e.t.) (3–4 p)	Filiași (3)
Gaz Metan Mediaș (1)	0–1	Chindia Târgoviște (1)
Dinamo București (1)	1–2	Argeș Pitești (1)
27 October 2021
Minaur Baia Mare (3)	0–4	Universitatea Craiova (1)
Voluntari (1)	3–0 forfeit	FCSB (1)
28 October 2021
Buzău (2)	3–0	Dunărea Călărași (2)
FCU Craiova (1)	0–1	Sepsi OSK (1)
Politehnica Timișoara (2)	2–0	Rapid București (1)

== Quarter-finals ==
The matches were played on 30 November, 1 and 2 December 2021.

Team 1	Score	Team 2
30 November 2021
Chindia Târgoviște (1)	1–2	Sepsi OSK (1)
1 December 2021
Buzău (2)	0–1	Voluntari (1)
Politehnica Timișoara (2)	0–0 (a.e.t.) (4–5 p)	Argeș Pitești (1)
2 December 2021
Filiași (3)	0–3	Universitatea Craiova (1)

== Semi-finals ==
Team 1	Agg.	Team 2	1st leg	2nd leg
Sepsi OSK (1)	3–1	Universitatea Craiova (1)	2–1	1–0
Voluntari (1)	3–0	Argeș Pitești (1)	2–0	1–0

== Final ==
19 May 2022	Sepsi OSK	2–1	Voluntari	Bucharest
20:30 EET (UTC+3)	Ștefănescu 22', 38'		Dumitrescu 90+5' (o.g.)	Stadium: Rapid-Giulești; Attendance: 8.128; Referee: Sebastian Colțescu

Cupa României 2021–22 winners

1st title
