= George Merloi =

Romanian footballer

Personal information
- Full name: George Cristian Merloi
- Date of birth: 15 October 1999 (age 27)
- Place of birth: Bucharest, Romania
- Height: 1.70 m (5 ft 7 in)
- Position: Midfielder

Team information
- Current team: Voluntari
- Number: 10

Youth career
- 2012–2016: Steaua București
- 2016–2018: Rennes

Senior career*
Years	Team	Apps	(Gls)
2018–2019	Rennes B	12	(1)
2019–2020	Academica Clinceni	28	(4)
2020–2021	Astra Giurgiu	26	(2)
2021–2024	Voluntari	50	(6)
2024	Farul Constanța	0	(0)
2024–	Voluntari	45	(6)

International career
2017–2018	Romania U19	4	(1)
2019–2020	Romania U21	2	(0)
- * Club domestic league appearances and goals as of 2 November 2026

George Cristian Merloi (born 15 October 1999) is a Romanian professional footballer who plays as a midfielder for Liga I club Voluntari.

== Career statistics ==
As of match played 2 November 2026

Appearances and goals by club, season and competition
Club	Season	League			National cup (Note: Includes Cupa României)		Europe		Other		Total	
Club	Season	Division	Apps	Goals	Apps	Goals	Apps	Goals	Apps	Goals	Apps	Goals
Rennes B	2018–19	Championnat National 3	12	1	—		—		—		12	1
Academica Clinceni	2019–20	Liga I	28	4	2	0	—		—		30	4
Astra Giurgiu	2020–21	Liga I	26	2	5	1	—		—		31	3
Voluntari	2021–22	Liga I	16	0	3	0	—		—		19	0
Voluntari	2022–23	Liga I	23	0	3	0	—		0	0	26	0
Voluntari	2023–24	Liga I	11	6	2	0	—		—		13	6
Voluntari	Total		50	6	8	0	—		0	0	58	6
Farul Constanța	2024–25	Liga I	0	0	—		—		—		0	0
Voluntari	2024–25	Liga II	21	3	—		—		2 (Note: Appearance in Liga I promotion/relegation play-offs)	0	23	3
Voluntari	2025–26	Liga II	13	2	1	0	—		1	0	15	2
Voluntari	2026–27	Liga I	11	1	2	1	—		—		13	2
Voluntari	Total		45	6	3	1	—		3	0	51	7
Career total			161	19	18	2	0	0	3	0	182	21

== Honours ==
Astra Giurgiu

- Cupa României runner-up: 2020–21

Voluntari

- Cupa României runner-up: 2021–22
