= FC Voluntari =

Association football club in Voluntari

Voluntari
- Full name: SC Fotbal Club Voluntari SA
- Nicknames: Voluntărenii (The People from Voluntari); Ilfovenii (The People from Ilfov)
- Short name: Voluntari
- Founded: 26 July 2010; 16 years ago
- Ground: Anghel Iordănescu
- Capacity: 4,600
- Owner: Voluntari Town
- General Director: Bogdan Bălănescu
- Head coach: Florin Pîrvu
- League: Liga I
- 2025–26: Liga II; Regular season: 5th of 22; Play-off: 3rd of 6 (promoted via playoffs)
- Website: fcvoluntari.ro
Home colours	Away colours

Fotbal Club Voluntari (Romanian pronunciation: [volunˈtarʲ]), commonly known as FC Voluntari or simply Voluntari, is a Romanian professional football club based in Voluntari, Ilfov County, that competes in Liga I, the first tier of the Romanian league system. The team plays its home matches at Anghel Iordănescu Stadium, which has a capacity of 4,600 spectators.

Founded in 2010, Voluntari achieved successive promotions from Liga III to Liga I in 2014 and 2015, becoming one of the few clubs in Romanian football to make this leap. The club spent nine consecutive seasons in Romania's top flight between 2015 and 2024. It won its first major trophies in 2017, lifting both the Cupa României and the Supercupa României.

== History ==
=== Football in Voluntari before 2010 ===
Organised football in Voluntari dates back to 1987, when Inter Voluntari was founded, competing in the Ilfov County championships and spending two seasons in Divizia C as CS Voluntari before later competing in Liga IV Bucharest until disappearing in 2012.

=== Foundation and rise through the divisions ===
FC Voluntari was founded in the summer of 2010, when the club took over the place of Petrolul Berca in Liga III. Several players and head coach Romeo Bunică also moved from Berca to the newly formed Ilfov club, which assembled a new squad and played its home matches at Viscofil Stadium in Popești-Leordeni. In their debut season in the third tier, the club finished 6th in Series II.

In the 2011–12 season, Bunică left in October after nine rounds to join Otopeni and was replaced by Robert Niță, who was succeeded in January 2012 by Bogdan Andone. Under Andone's leadership, the Ilfov-based side again finished 6th in Series II.

In the 2012–13 season, the club was placed in Series III and moved its home matches to the newly opened Niță Pintea Stadium in Voluntari. Poor results left the team bottom of the standings after five rounds, leading to the dismissal of Bogdan Andone. Romeo Bunică returned as head coach in early October 2012 and guided the team to a 7th-place finish.

Following the establishment of the FC Voluntari Academy in 2012 and the adoption of a development model inspired by the Gheorghe Hagi Academy, the club entered a partnership with Viitorul Constanța. As part of the project, Adrian Iencsi was appointed head coach for the 2013–14 campaign, with Ilie Poenaru as assistant, and several young players, including Florin Tănase, Cosmin Achim, Bogdan Vasile, Bogdan Mitache and Bogdan Țîru, joined the senior squad. The team also included players such as Paul Botaș, Cristian Irimia, Florin Maxim, S. Rădoi, Dinu Todoran, Ad. Bălan, George Călințaru, Ad. Voicu and Mihai Voduț. Voluntari dominated Series II, finishing first in both the regular season and the play-off and securing promotion to Liga II.

Following promotion, Ilie Poenaru was appointed head coach after Adrian Iencsi's departure. In the 2014–15 season, Voluntari continued its strong form in Series I, finishing first in both the regular season and the play-off, thirteen points ahead of second-placed Academica Argeș and thirty points ahead of third-placed Gloria Buzău, thereby securing promotion to Romania's top flight. The squad included Botaș, Hînțescu, Crăciun, C. Roșu, Lircă, Achim, Poverlovici, Maxim, Mitache, S. Rădoi, Novac, B. Barbu, A. Cârstocea, G. Deac, E. Stan, Leasă, M. Ene, Todoran, Ad. Bălan, Călințaru, M. Matei, Ad. Voicu and Voduț.

=== Top-flight years and first trophies ===
Its debut season in Liga I proved difficult, as numerous technical and administrative changes left the club involved in the relegation battle. After finishing 12th, Voluntari faced UTA Arad in a promotion/relegation play-off and won 3–1 on aggregate, retaining its place in the top flight.

With experienced players such as Vasile Maftei, Florin Cernat and Laurențiu Marinescu in the squad, Voluntari improved during the 2016–17 season, finishing 9th and avoiding a second consecutive promotion/relegation play-off. The club also achieved the first major success in its history by winning the 2016–17 Cupa României. In the final against Astra Giurgiu, the match ended 1–1 after extra time before Voluntari won the penalty shoot-out 5–3.

The success was followed by another trophy at the beginning of the 2017–18 season, when Voluntari defeated reigning champions Viitorul Constanța 1–0 in the Supercupa României, with Costin Lazăr scoring the only goal. It was the second major trophy in the club's history.

Voluntari remained in the top flight during the following seasons, generally competing in the lower half of the standings. One of its strongest campaigns came in 2021–22, when the club qualified for the championship play-off and also reached the final of the 2021–22 Cupa României. In the final, played at Giulești Stadium in Bucharest, Voluntari was defeated 2–1 by Sepsi OSK, finishing as runners-up for the first time in the competition.

After nine consecutive seasons in the first division, Voluntari was relegated at the end of the 2023–24 season, finishing in one of the two direct relegation positions in the play-out and returning to Liga II for the first time since 2015.

=== Return to Liga II and promotion (2024–2026) ===
In the 2024–25 season, Voluntari qualified for the promotion play-off and earned a two-legged promotion/relegation play-off against Unirea Slobozia. Voluntari won the first leg 2–1 at home, but lost the return match 0–1 after extra time. With the aggregate score level, Unirea won the penalty shoot-out 4–3, leaving Voluntari in the second tier for another season.

Voluntari again reached the promotion play-off in the 2025–26 season and remained in contention for a return to the top flight throughout the campaign. The club eventually qualified for the promotion/relegation play-off against Hermannstadt. Hermannstadt won the first leg 3–2 in Sibiu, despite Voluntari recovering from a three-goal deficit to reduce the difference to one goal. In the return leg at the Anghel Iordănescu Stadium, Voluntari won 3–0 through two penalties scored by Matko Babić and a late goal from Ioan Tolea, winning the tie 5–3 on aggregate and securing promotion back to the SuperLiga after two seasons in Liga II.

FC Voluntari returned to the top flight for the 2026–27 season, making its first SuperLiga appearance in two years.

== Stadium ==
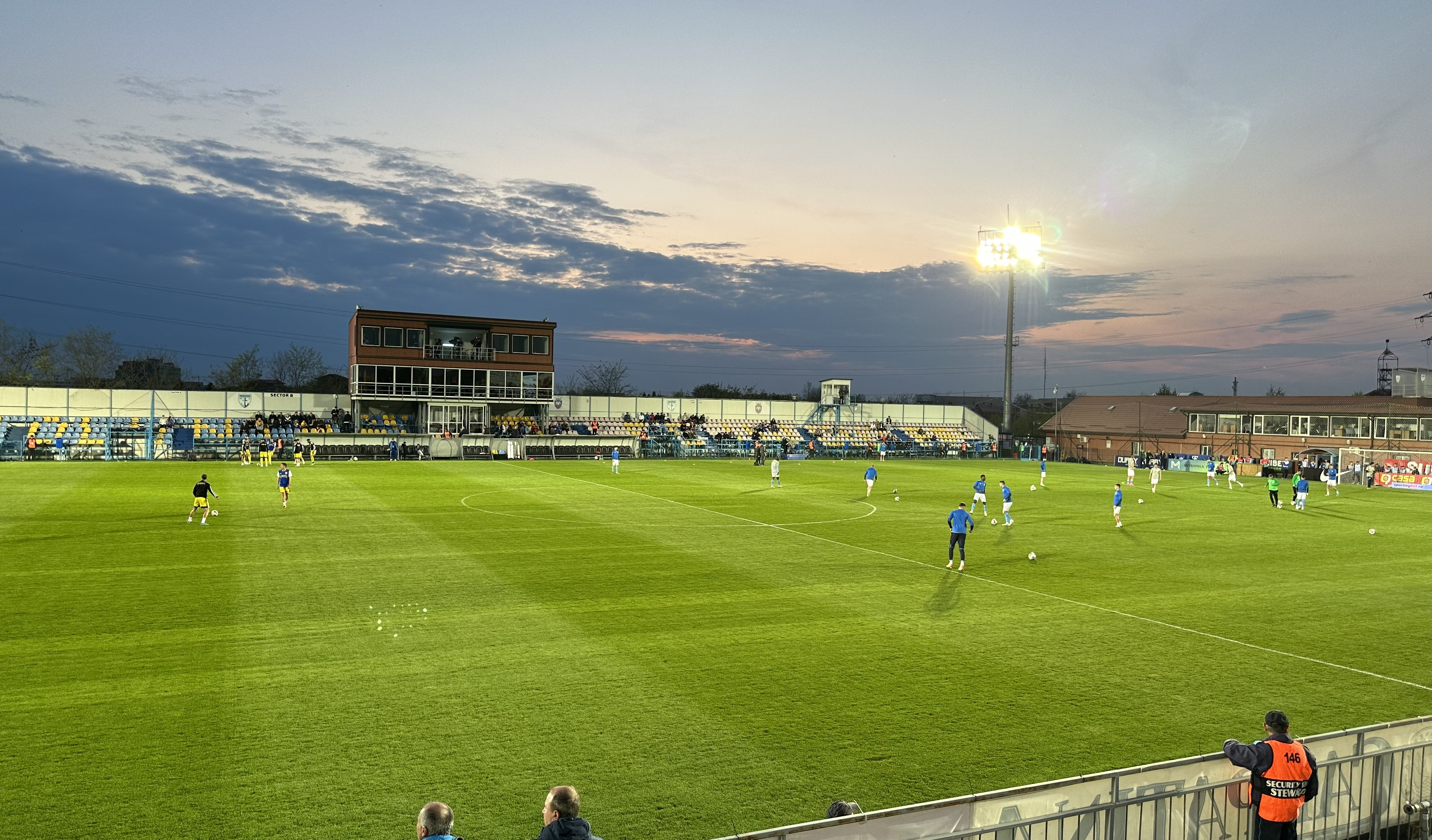
Stadionul Anghel Iordănescu as seen from the First Stand.

The club plays its home matches at the 4,600-seater Stadionul Anghel Iordănescu in Voluntari. Attendances are usually modest, as Voluntari is considered a suburb of Bucharest and many of its citizens are inclined to support clubs from the capital instead.

== Honours ==
=== Leagues ===
Liga II

- Winners (1): 2014–15

Liga III

- Winners (1): 2013–14

=== Cups ===
Cupa României

- Winners (1): 2016–17

Supercupa României

- Winners (1): 2017

== Players ==
=== First-team squad ===
As of 8 October 2026

Note: Flags indicate national team as defined under FIFA eligibility rules; some limited exceptions apply. Players may hold more than one non-FIFA nationality.

No.	Pos.	Nation	Player
4	DF	MDA	Daniel Dumbrăvanu
5	DF	ROU	Denis Haruț
6	DF	SRB	Sava Čestić
7	FW	ROU	Mihai Roman
8	MF	ROU	Ion Gheorghe (Captain)
9	FW	CRO	Matko Babić
10	MF	ROU	George Merloi
11	MF	ROU	Remus Guțea
12	GK	ROU	Bogdan Ștefan
14	GK	ROU	Eduard Chioveanu
17	DF	ROU	Andrei Pițian (Vice-captain)
19	FW	ROU	Marvin Schieb
20	DF	ROU	Alexandru Gîț

No.	Pos.	Nation	Player
21	MF	ROU	Robert Petculescu
22	MF	POR	Nuno Rodrigues
23	DF	CRO	Matej Mamić
25	DF	BEN	David Kiki
27	DF	ROU	Radu Crișan (4th captain)
28	DF	ROU	Mario Ștefan
29	FW	ROU	Adi Chică-Roșă
30	DF	ROU	Alexandru Șuteu
31	GK	SLO	Metod Jurhar
40	MF	CRO	Lovro Cvek
44	DF	ROU	Mihael Onișa (3rd captain)
80	MF	CUW	Godfried Roemeratoe
99	FW	ROU	Ianis Vencu

=== Out on loan ===
Note: Flags indicate national team as defined under FIFA eligibility rules; some limited exceptions apply. Players may hold more than one non-FIFA nationality.

No.	Pos.	Nation	Player
41	DF	ROU	Ștefan Ioniță (at CSL Ștefănești until 30 June 2027)
—	GK	ROU	Cristian Hodor (at Voința Crevedia until 30 June 2027)
—	DF	ROU	David Todoran (at Unirea Slobozia until 30 June 2027)
—	MF	ROU	Florian Haită (at Bihor Oradea until 30 June 2027)

No.	Pos.	Nation	Player
—	MF	ROU	Darius Ghindovean (at Concordia Chiajna until 30 June 2027)
—	MF	ROU	Albert Ghiță (at Progresul Drăgănești until 30 June 2027)
—	FW	ROU	Ștefan Todoran (at Metaloglobus București until 30 June 2027)
—		ROU	Codruț Șerban (at Progresul Mogoșoaia until 30 June 2027)

== Club officials ==
=== Board of directors ===
Role	Name
Owner	(Romania) Voluntari Town
President	(Romania) Robert Gherghe
General Director	(Romania) Bogdan Bălănescu
Board President	(Romania) Robert Frunză
Vice-president	(Romania) Bogdan Niculaie
Economic Director	(Romania) Diana Istrate
Sporting director	(Moldova) Igor Armaș
Administrative Director	(Romania) Ionuț Bogaciu
Youth Center Manager	(Romania) Ion Moldovan
Youth Center Coordinator	(Romania) Cătălin Bârleanu
Organizer of Competitions	(Romania) Emil Badea
Secretary	(Romania) Florin Verigeanu
Responsible for Order and Safety	(Romania) Iulian Ghirie
Press Officer	(Romania) Radu Oprișan

- Last updated: 29 November 2025

=== Current technical staff ===
Role	Name
Head coach	(Romania) Florin Pîrvu
Assistant coaches	(Romania) Cristian Burlacu (Romania) Gabriel Cânu
Goalkeeping coach	(Romania) Florin Tene
Fitness coach	(Romania) Alexandru Petcu
Club doctor	(Romania) Tiberiu Horcea
Physiotherapist	(Romania) Dan Sarivan
Masseurs	(Romania) Florin Onosă (Romania) Florin Ioniță
Storeman	(Romania) Dumitru Radu

- Last updated: 22 August 2025

== Notable former players ==
The footballers enlisted below have had international cap(s) for their respective countries at junior and/or senior level and/or more than significant caps for FC Voluntari.

Romania

- (Romania) Cosmin Achim
- (Romania) Florin Acsinte
- (Romania) Doru Andrei
- (Romania) Ionuț Balaur
- (Romania) Dragoș Balauru
- (Romania) Adrian Bălan
- (Romania) Radu Boboc
- (Romania) Mircea Bornescu
- (Romania) Marius Briceag
- (Romania) Nicolae Carnat
- (Romania) Mihai Căpățînă
- (Romania) Florin Cernat
- (Romania) Cristian Costin
- (Romania) Costin Curelea
- (Romania) Gabriel Deac
- (Romania) Andrei Dumiter
- (Romania) Daniel Florea
- (Romania) Ion Gheorghe
- (Romania) Petre Ivanovici
- (Romania) Costin Lazăr
- (Romania) Vasile Maftei
- (Romania) Laurențiu Marinescu
- (Romania) Florin Maxim
- (Romania) Daniel Novac
- (Romania) Daniel Pancu
- (Romania) Mihai Popa
- (Romania) Doru Popadiuc
- (Romania) Mihai Răduț
- (Romania) Alexandru Răuță
- (Romania) Victor Rîmniceanu
- (Romania) Gabriel Tamaș
- (Romania) Dinu Todoran
- (Romania) Daniel Toma
- (Romania) Alexandru Tudorie
- (Romania) Alexandru Vlad
- (Romania) Mihai Voduț

Albania

- (Albania) Naser Aliji

Argentina

- (Argentina) Juan Cascini
- (Argentina) Nicolás Gorobsov
- (Argentina) Patricio Matricardi
- (Argentina) Cristian Paz

Brazil

- (Brazil) Eric

Bulgaria

- (Bulgaria) Bozhidar Mitrev

Cape Verde

- (Cape Verde) Hélder Tavares

Czech Republic

- (Czech Republic) Lukáš Droppa

Croatia

- (Croatia) Ljuban Crepulja
- (Croatia) Hrvoje Spahija

DR Congo

- (Democratic Republic of the Congo) Wilfred Moke

Greece

- (Greece) Thanasis Papazoglou

Haiti

- (Haiti) Jean Sony Alcénat

Iceland

- (Iceland) Rúnar Már Sigurjónsson

Ivory Coast

- (Ivory Coast) Ulrich Meleke

Moldova

- (Moldova) Igor Armaș
- (Moldova) Vitalie Damașcan
- (Moldova) Vadim Raţă

Netherlands

- (Netherlands) John Goossens

Portugal

- (Portugal) Marcelo Lopes
- (Portugal) Ricardinho

Slovakia

- (Slovakia) Adam Nemec

Spain

- (Spain) Jefté Betancor
- (Spain) Jesús Fernández
- (Spain) Pablo de Lucas

Tunisia

- (Tunisia) Aïssa Laïdouni

== Notable former managers ==
- (Romania) Bogdan Andone (2011–2012)
- (Romania) Adrian Iencsi (2013–2014)
- (Romania) Ilie Poenaru (2014–2015)
- (Romania) Gheorghe Mulțescu (2015–2016)
- (Italy) Cristiano Bergodi (2018–2020)
- (Romania) Mihai Teja (2020)
- (Romania) Liviu Ciobotariu (2021–2023)
- (Romania) Ilie Poenaru (2023–2024)
- (Romania) Claudiu Niculescu (2024)
- (Romania) Florin Marin (2024–2025)
- (Romania) Mihai Iosif (2025)
- (Romania) Florin Pîrvu (2025–present)

== League and cup history ==
Season	Tier	Division	Place	Notes	Cupa României	Supercupa României
2026–27	1	Liga I	TBD		TBD	—
2025–26	2	Liga II	3rd	Promoted	Play-off round	—
2024–25	2	Liga II	4th		Play-off round	—
2023–24	1	Liga I	15th	Relegated	Semi-finals	—
2022–23	1	Liga I	9th		Group stage	—
2021–22	1	Liga I	4th		Runner-up	—
2020–21	1	Liga I	13th	Relegation play-off winner	Round of 32	—
2019–20	1	Liga I	11th		Round of 16	—
2018–19	1	Liga I	11th		Round of 16	—
2017–18	1	Liga I	12th	Relegation play-off winner	Round of 32	Winner
2016–17	1	Liga I	9th		Winner	—
2015–16	1	Liga I	12th	Relegation play-off winner	Round of 32	—
2014–15	2	Liga II (Series I)	1st (C)	Promoted	Fifth round	—
2013–14	3	Liga III (Series II)	1st (C)	Promoted	Fifth round	—
2012–13	3	Liga III (Series III)	7th		Third round	—
2011–12	3	Liga III (Series II)	6th		Third round	—
2010–11	3	Liga III (Series II)	6th			—
