= 2018–19 CS Gaz Metan Mediaș season =

Gaz Metan Mediaș
2018–19 season
- Chairman: Ioan Mărginean
- Manager: Mihai Teja (until Dec 2018); Edward Iordanescu (from Jan 2019)
- Stadium: Gaz Metan
- Liga I: 7th
- Cupa României: Round of 16
- Top goalscorer: League: All: Mario Rondón 10 goals

The 2018–19 season will be the 72nd season of competitive football by Gaz Metan Mediaș, and the 3rd consecutive in Liga I. Gaz Metan Mediaș will compete in the Liga I and in Cupa României.

== Previous season positions ==
	Competition	Position
(Romania)	Liga I	10th
(Romania)	Cupa României	Semi-finals

== Competitions ==
Win Draw Loss

=== Liga I ===
The Liga I fixture list was announced on 5 July 2018.

==== Regular season ====
===== Table =====
Pos	Team	Pld	W	D	L	GF	GA	GD	Pts	Qualification
9	Dinamo București	26	8	8	10	29	37	−8	32	Qualification for the Relegation round
10	Hermannstadt	26	9	5	12	25	28	−3	32	Qualification for the Relegation round
11	Gaz Metan Mediaș	26	7	10	9	25	32	−7	31	Qualification for the Relegation round
12	Dunărea Călărași	26	4	12	10	16	25	−9	24	Qualification for the Relegation round
13	Voluntari	26	4	9	13	30	46	−16	21	Qualification for the Relegation round

Source: LPF (in Romanian), Soccerway
Rules for classification: 1) Points; 2) Head-to-head points; 3) Head-to-head goal difference; 4) Head-to-head goals scored; 5) Goal difference; 6) Goals scored; 7) Play-off.

===== Results summary =====
Overall								Home						Away					
Pld	W	D	L	GF	GA	GD	Pts	W	D	L	GF	GA	GD	W	D	L	GF	GA	GD
26	7	10	9	25	32	−7	31	5	4	4	16	16	0	2	6	5	9	16	−7

Last updated: 2 March 2019.
Source: Liga I

===== Results by round =====
Round	1	2	3	4	5	6	7	8	9	10	11	12	13	14	15	16	17	18	19	20	21	22	23	24	25	26
Ground	H	A	H	H	A	H	A	H	A	H	A	H	A	A	H	A	A	H	A	H	A	H	A	H	A	H
Result	W	D	W	L	L	D	W	W	L	W	W	L	D	D	W	D	L	D	D	L	L	D	L	L	D	D

Updated to match(es) played on 2 March 2019. Source: Liga I
A = Away; H = Home; W = Win; D = Draw; L = Loss

===== Matches =====
Win Draw Loss

23 July 2018 1	Gaz Metan Mediaș	2–1	Concordia Chiajna	Mediaș
18:00 EEST (UTC+3)	Nasser Chamed 27'; Fofana (yellow card) 36'; V.Crețu (yellow card) 80'; Fortes 90+3'	Report	Guessan 39' (yellow card) 60'; G.Matei (yellow card) 45'	Stadium: Gaz Metan; Attendance: 700; Referee: George Cătălin Găman

30 July 2018 2	FC Voluntari	1–1	Gaz Metan Mediaș	Voluntari
18:00 EEST (UTC+3)	Belahmeur 3' (yellow card) 90+1'; Ciucur (yellow card) 49'	Report	Fortes 18'; I.Cristea (yellow card) 45+3'	Stadium: Anghel Iordănescu; Attendance: 400; Referee: Horia Gabriel Mladinovici

6 August 2018 3	Gaz Metan Mediaș	3–2	Dinamo București	Mediaș
21:00 EEST (UTC+3)	D.Olaru 7'; Diallo (yellow card) 52'; M.Popescu 56' (o.g.); Fortes 58'; S.Bușu (yellow card) 78'; V.Crețu (yellow card) 89'	Report	Salomão 32'; R.Moldoveanu 47'	Stadium: Gaz Metan; Attendance: 6,500; Referee: Horațiu Feșnic (Cluj)

12 August 2018 4	Gaz Metan Mediaș	1–3	FCSB	Mediaș
21:00 EEST (UTC+3)	D.Olaru (yellow card) 18'; Fortes (yellow card) 25'; Fofana 30'	Report	Rusescu (yellow card) 15'; Planić (yellow card) 25'; O.Moruțan 49'; Gnohéré 63'; O.Popescu (yellow card) 71'; F.Coman 83'	Stadium: Gaz Metan; Attendance: 5,200; Referee: Marius Avram

18 August 2018 5	Viitorul Constanța	2–0	Gaz Metan Mediaș	Ovidiu
21:00 EEST (UTC+3)	T.Băluță (yellow card) 20'; D.Drăguș 29'; S.Mladen (yellow card) 51' (yellow-red card) 56'; A.Ciobanu 85'	Report	V.Crețu (yellow card) 6'; Fofana (yellow card) 18'; I.Cristea (yellow card) 65'	Stadium: Viitorul; Attendance: 2,000; Referee: Adrian Viorel Cojocaru

26 August 2018 6	Gaz Metan Mediaș	0–0	CFR Cluj	Mediaș
18:00 EEST (UTC+3)	S.Bușu (yellow card) 36' (yellow-red card) 71'	Report	R.Tambe (yellow card) 38'; M.Bordeianu (yellow card) 78'	Stadium: Gaz Metan; Attendance: 4,000; Referee: Sebastian Colțescu

1 September 2018 7	Hermannstadt	0–1	Gaz Metan Mediaș	Târgu Mureș
16:00 EEST (UTC+3)	A.Coman (yellow card) 18'; P.Petrescu (yellow card) 62'; C.Pîrvulescu (yellow card) 65'	Report	V.Crețu 66'	Stadium: Trans-Sil; Attendance: 500; Referee: Radu Petrescu

15 September 2018 8	Gaz Metan Mediaș	3–2	Universitatea Craiova	Mediaș
21:00 EEST (UTC+3)	V.Crețu (yellow card) 5'; Fortes (yellow card) 7' (goal) 26'; M.Constantin 11' (pen.); I.Cristea (yellow card) 42' (goal) 82'; Pleșca (yellow card) 70'; Fofana (yellow card) 75'	Report	A.Mitriță (yellow card) 6' (goal) 8' (pen.), 63'; C.Bărbuț (yellow card) 35'; Kelić (yellow card) 64'; Koljić 75' (pen.); Fedele (red card) 90'	Stadium: Gaz Metan; Attendance: 3,000; Referee: Andrei Chivulete

24 September 2018 9	Astra Giurgiu	3–0	Gaz Metan Mediaș	Giurgiu
21:00 EEST (UTC+3)	Bahamboula 40'; N.Roșu 63', 75'; Radunović (yellow card) 90+1'	Report	D.Olaru (yellow card) 15'; L.Aurélio (yellow card) 25' (yellow-red card) 56'; Fofana (yellow card) 30'; R.Romeo (yellow card) 72'	Stadium: Marin Anastasovici; Attendance: 1,000; Referee: Horațiu Feșnic (Cluj)

30 September 2018 10	Gaz Metan Mediaș	1–0	Politehnica Iași	Mediaș
16:00 EEST (UTC+3)	M.Constantin 17' (yellow card) 77'; D.Olaru (yellow card) 19'; V.Crețu (yellow card) 39'; Fortes (yellow card) 54'; Ely 90+1'; Caiado (yellow card) 90+3'	Report	Panțîru (yellow card) 27'; Qaka (yellow card) 71'; Platini (yellow card) 78'; A.Sin (yellow card) 87'	Stadium: Gaz Metan; Attendance: 2,000; Referee: Sorin Andrei Antonie

7 October 2018 11	Sepsi Sfântu Gheorghe	1–2	Gaz Metan Mediaș	Sfântu Gheorghe
18:00 EEST (UTC+3)	Y.Hamed 31'	Report	I.Cristea 38'; Fortes (yellow card) 57'; Trif (yellow card) 60'; Ely (yellow card) 74'; D.Olaru (yellow card) 84'; Caiado 89'	Stadium: Municipal; Attendance: 3,500; Referee: Radu Petrescu

21 October 2018 12	Gaz Metan Mediaș	1–2	FC Botoșani	Mediaș
18:00 EEST (UTC+3)	Yazalde 15'; V.Crețu (yellow card) 23'	Report	A.Dumitraș (yellow card) 69'; M.A.Roman 73'; J.Rodríguez 89' (pen.) (yellow card) 90+2'	Stadium: Gaz Metan; Attendance: 1,500; Referee: István Kovács (Carei)

28 October 2018 13	Dunărea Călărași	0–0	Gaz Metan Mediaș	Călărași
14:00 EET (UTC+2)	Dobrosavlevici (yellow card) 60'	Report	Fofana (yellow card) 40'; Nasser Chamed (yellow card) 68'; V.Crețu (yellow card) 90+4'	Stadium: Ion Comșa; Attendance: 2,550; Referee: George Cătălin Găman

5 November 2018 14	Concordia Chiajna	0–0	Gaz Metan Mediaș	Chiajna
18:00 EET (UTC+2)	A.Marc (yellow card) 59'; Grădinaru (yellow card) 74'	Report		Stadium: Concordia; Attendance: 200; Referee: George Rădulescu

12 November 2018 15	Gaz Metan Mediaș	2–0	FC Voluntari	Mediaș
21:00 EET (UTC+2)	I.Cristea (yellow card) 1'; Fofana 10'; M.Constantin 40' (pen.); D.Olaru (yellow card) 75'	Report	Răuță (yellow card) 37'; Căpățînă (yellow card) 54'	Stadium: Gaz Metan; Attendance: 500; Referee: Horațiu Feșnic (Cluj)

23 November 2018 16	Dinamo București	1–1	Gaz Metan Mediaș	Bucharest
20:30 EET (UTC+2)	Rachid (yellow card) 44'; M.Popescu (yellow card) 55' (yellow-red card) 87'; Salomão (yellow card) 84' (goal) 90+4'	Report	Trif 77'; Fofana (yellow card) 89'; Fortes (yellow card) 90+3'	Stadium: Dinamo; Attendance: 1,220; Referee: Iulian Călin

2 December 2018 17	FCSB	2–1	Gaz Metan Mediaș	Pitești
20:00 EET (UTC+2)	J.Morais (yellow card) 4'; Bălașa (yellow card) 34'; Man 41'; F.Tănase 53' (pen.); D.Nedelcu (yellow card) 83'	Report	A.Ivanov (yellow card) 9' (yellow-red card) 37'; M.Constantin (yellow card) 26'; V.Crețu (yellow card) 56'; Fortes 63'; S.Bușu (yellow card) 79'; L.Aurélio (yellow card) 88'; Fofana (yellow card) 90+2'	Stadium: Nicolae Dobrin; Attendance: 3,245; Referee: Ovidiu Hațegan

5 December 2018 18	Gaz Metan Mediaș	2–2	Viitorul Constanța	Mediaș
17:30 EET (UTC+2)	Luchin 25' (o.g.); M.Constantin (red card) 39'; Fortes (yellow card) 41'; Yazalde 89'	Report	D.Drăguș 32'; de Nooijer (yellow card) 44'; L.Houri 74'; Voduț (yellow card) 80'; T.Băluță (yellow card) 83'; V.Ghiță (yellow card) 87'	Stadium: Gaz Metan; Attendance: 500; Referee: Cătălin Popa

8 December 2018 19	CFR Cluj	2–2	Gaz Metan Mediaș	Cluj-Napoca
20:00 EET (UTC+2)	A.Păun (yellow card) 7'; Omrani 43', 87'; Culio (yellow card) 58' (goal) 90+5'; Vinícius (yellow card) 83'	Report	Ely 12'; A.Ivanov 32'; Trif (yellow card) 62' (yellow-red card) 64'; L.Aurélio (yellow card) 88'	Stadium: Dr. Constantin Rădulescu; Attendance: 2,000; Referee: Radu Petrescu

15 December 2018 20	Gaz Metan Mediaș	0–2	Hermannstadt	Mediaș
17:00 EET (UTC+2)	L.Aurélio (yellow card) 39'; V.Crețu (yellow card) 55'; I.Cristea (yellow card) 66'	Report	D.Tătar 30' (yellow card) 85'; Dâlbea (yellow card) 41'; I.Stoica 49'	Stadium: Gaz Metan; Attendance: 1,000; Referee: George Cătălin Găman

19 December 2018 21	Universitatea Craiova	2–0	Gaz Metan Mediaș	Craiova
20:00 EET (UTC+2)	Mateiu (yellow card) 25'; A.Mitriță 52', 87' (pen.)	Report	Fofana (yellow card) 24' (yellow-red card) 32'; Nasser Chamed (yellow card) 76'	Stadium: Ion Oblemenco; Attendance: 3,500; Referee: Horațiu Feșnic (Cluj)

1 February 2019 22	Gaz Metan Mediaș	1–1	Astra Giurgiu	Mediaș
20:00 EET (UTC+2)	Chamed 45+1'; Ivanov (yellow card) 69'; Constantin (yellow card) 82'; Olaru (yellow card) 83'	Report	Erico (yellow card) 22'; Lazar (yellow card) 22'; Cestor (yellow card) 24'; Bejan (yellow card) 64'; Butean 66'; Radunović (yellow card) 72'	Stadium: Gaz Metan; Attendance: 1,500; Referee: Sebastian Colțescu

10 February 2019 23	Politehnica Iași	1–0	Gaz Metan Mediaș	Iași
18:30 EET (UTC+2)	Zaharia 29' (yellow card) 89'; Sin (yellow card) 61'; Bosoi (yellow card) 87'; Rubén Miño (yellow card) 90+3'	Report	Fofana (yellow card) 45'; Cristea (yellow card) 57'; Crețu (yellow card) 63'; Ely Fernandes (yellow card) 88'	Stadium: Emil Alexandrescu; Attendance: 1,500; Referee: Radu Petrescu

17 February 2019 24	Gaz Metan Mediaș	0–1	Sepsi Sfântu Gheorghe	Mediaș
17:30 EET (UTC+2)	Ely Fernandes (yellow card) 44'; Rondón (yellow card) 49'; Constantin (yellow card) 59'	Report	Tandia 9' (pen.); Rus (yellow card) 32'; Omar (yellow card) 44'; Jovanović (yellow card) 44'; Gabriel (yellow card) 57'	Stadium: Gaz Metan; Attendance: 3,000; Referee: István Kovács (referee)

24 February 2019 25	Botoșani	1–1	Gaz Metan Mediaș	Botoșani
17:00 EET (UTC+2)	Fülöp 42' (yellow card) 43'; Golofca (yellow card) 43'; Soiledis (yellow card) 60'; Dumitraș (yellow card) 62'; Rmoan (yellow card) 79'; Burcă (yellow card) 86'	Report	Cristea 37' (yellow card) 61'; Olaru (yellow card) 52'; Fofana (yellow card) 82'; Chamed (yellow card) 90+1'; Diallo (yellow card) 90+3'	Stadium: Municipal; Attendance: 2,000; Referee: Sebastian Colțescu

2 March 2019 26	Gaz Metan Mediaș	0–0	Dunărea Călărași	Mediaș
13:00 EET (UTC+2)	David Caiado (yellow card) 58'; Luís Aurélio (yellow card) 83'	Report	Vlădoiu (yellow card) 1'; Ndiaye (yellow card) 55'; Bourceanu (yellow card) 90+2'	Stadium: Gaz Metan; Attendance: 1,000; Referee: Lucian Ruşandu

==== Relegation round ====
===== Table =====
Pos	Team	Pld	W	D	L	GF	GA	GD	Pts	Qualification or relegation
7	Gaz Metan Mediaș	14	10	2	2	25	9	+16	48	
8	Botoșani	14	8	2	4	18	9	+9	44	
9	Dinamo București	14	8	3	3	16	7	+9	43	
10	Politehnica Iași	14	3	5	6	12	18	−6	31	
11	Voluntari	14	5	5	4	14	16	−2	31	
12	Hermannstadt (O)	14	2	5	7	9	19	−10	27	Qualification for the relegation play-offs
13	Dunărea Călărași (R)	14	3	4	7	8	18	−10	25	Relegation to Liga II
14	Concordia Chiajna (R)	14	2	4	8	17	23	−6	19	Relegation to Liga II

Source: Soccerway
Rules for classification: 1) Points; 2) Points without rounding; 3) Head-to-head points; 4) Head-to-head goal difference; 5) Head-to-head goals scored; 6) Goal difference; 7) Goals scored; 8) Play-off (only if needed to decide teams for relegation). (Note: only criteria 6 and 7 are applied to establish the classification during the competition.)
(O) Play-off winners; (R) Relegated

===== Results summary =====
Overall								Home						Away					
Pld	W	D	L	GF	GA	GD	Pts	W	D	L	GF	GA	GD	W	D	L	GF	GA	GD
14	10	2	2	25	9	+16	32	5	2	0	16	4	+12	5	0	2	9	5	+4

Last updated: 2 June 2019.
Source: Liga I

===== Position by round =====
Round	1	2	3	4	5	6	7	8	9	10	11	12	13	14
Ground	A	H	A	H	A	H	A	H	A	H	A	H	A	H
Result	W	W	W	W	W	D	W	W	L	D	L	W	W	W
Position	8	7	7	7	7	7	7	7	7	7	7	7	7	7

Updated to match(es) played on 2 June 2019. Source: Liga I
A = Away; H = Home; W = Win; D = Draw; L = Loss

===== Matches =====
Win Draw Loss

9 March 2019 1	Hermannstadt	0–2	Gaz Metan Mediaș	Pitești
	Dâlbea (yellow card) 16' (yellow-red card) 44'; Pârvulescu (yellow card) 39'; Mijušković (yellow card) 58'; Dandea (red card) 83'; Tătar (yellow card) 84'; Blănaru (yellow card) 90+3'	Report	Larie 6'; Bușu (yellow card) 18'; Fofana (yellow card) 27'; Mailat (yellow card) 84'; Rondón 90+1' (pen.)	Stadium: Stadionul Nicolae Dobrin; Attendance: 500; Referee: George Găman

17 March 2019 2	Gaz Metan Mediaș	2–1	Dinamo București	Mediaș
	Rondón 11'; Crețu (yellow card) 49'; David Caiado 58'; Bușu (yellow card) 65'	Report	Papazoglou 4'; Jaadi (yellow card) 34'; Klimavičius (yellow card) 57'	Stadium: Gaz Metan; Attendance: 4,500; Referee: Marian Barbu

31 March 2019 3	Politehnica Iași	1–2	Gaz Metan Mediaș	Iași
	Sanoh 58'; Semedo (yellow card) 60'; Bădic (yellow card) 60'; Gardoș (yellow card) 75'	Report	Rondón 51'; Bușu (yellow card) 53'; Luís Aurélio 54'	Stadium: Emil Alexandrescu; Attendance: 1,800; Referee: Ionu Coza

7 April 2019 4	Gaz Metan Mediaș	2–0	Botoșani	Mediaș
	Larie 12'; Constantin (yellow card) 25'; Chamed (yellow card) 50'; Luís Aurélio (yellow card) 73'; Bușu (yellow card) 77'; Olaru 90+3'	Report	Papa (yellow card) 60'; Miron (yellow card) 85'	Stadium: Gaz Metan; Attendance: 1,500; Referee: Marcel Bîrsan

14 April 2019 5	Voluntari	1–2	Gaz Metan Mediaș	Voluntari
	Căpățînă (yellow card) 3'; Vlad 38'	Report	David Caiado 12'; Fofana (yellow card) 55'; Rondón 79'; Constantin (yellow card) 83'	Stadium: Anghel Iordănescu; Attendance: 150; Referee: George Găman

21 April 2019 6	Gaz Metan Mediaș	0–0	Dunărea Călărași	Mediaș
	Ivanov (yellow card) 44'; Chamed (yellow card) 60'	Report	Filip (yellow card) 48'	Stadium: Gaz Metan; Attendance: 1,000; Referee: Sorin Andrei Antonie

26 April 2019 7	Concordia Chiajna	0–2	Gaz Metan Mediaș	Chiajna
	Koutroumpis (yellow card) 28'; Cristescu (yellow card) 54'; Ivanovici (yellow card) 70'; Marc (yellow card) 89'	Report	Crețu (yellow card) 17'; Olaru (yellow card) 59' (goal) 72'; Yazalde 67'; Constantin (yellow card) 90+2'	Stadium: Concordia; Attendance: 500; Referee: Adrian Viorel Cojocaru

3 May 2019 8	Gaz Metan Mediaș	4–1	Hermannstadt	Mediaș
	Rondón 25' 67' (pen.) 73'; David Caiado 70'; Crețu (yellow card) 88'	Report	Dâlbea (yellow card) 48' (goal) 89' (pen.); Mijušković (yellow card) 67'; Tătar (yellow card) 69'; Dandea (yellow card) 78'; Jazvić (yellow card) 82'	Stadium: Gaz Metan; Attendance: 2,000; Referee: George Rădulescu

10 May 2019 9	Dinamo București	2–0	Gaz Metan Mediaș	Bucharest
	Klimavičius (yellow card) 20'; Filip (yellow card) 28'; Aliji (yellow card) 40'; Montini 56' 80'; Mallo (yellow card) 74'; Dussault (yellow card) 83' (yellow-red card) 87'	Report	David Caiado (yellow card) 31'; Fofana (yellow card) 36'; Luís Aurélio (yellow card) 51'; Rondón (yellow card) 90+3'	Stadium: Dinamo; Attendance: 841; Referee: Florin Andrei

14 May 2019 10	Gaz Metan Mediaș	1–1	Politehnica Iași	Mediaș
	Olaru (yellow card) 15' (yellow-red card) 53'; Luís Aurélio (yellow card) 40'; Larie 60'; Crețu (yellow card) 90+4'	Report	Sanoh (yellow card) 20' (goal) 54'; Mihăescu (yellow card) 62'; Semedo (yellow card) 90+2'; Mihalache (yellow card) 90+4'	Stadium: Gaz Metan; Attendance: 500; Referee: Sebastian Colțescu

17 May 2019 11	Botoșani	1–0	Gaz Metan Mediaș	Botoșani
	Rodríguez 44' (pen.) (yellow card) 78'; Pițian (yellow card) 69'; Golofca (yellow card) 73'; Miron (yellow card) 86'	Report	Constantin (red card) 66'	Stadium: Municipal; Referee: Horia Mladinovici

23 May 2019 12	Gaz Metan Mediaș	4–0	Voluntari	Mediaș
	Ivanov (yellow card) 28'; David Caiado 32'; Bușu (yellow card) 45'; Rondón 68' (pen.); Olaru 86'; Ely Fernandes 90+2'	Report	Deac (yellow card) 34'; Belahmeur (yellow card) 90+1'	Stadium: Gaz Metan; Attendance: 400; Referee: Andrei Chivulete

26 May 2019 13	Dunărea Călărași	0–1	Gaz Metan Mediaș	Călărași
	Bourceanu (yellow card) 33'; Iancu (yellow card) 54' (yellow-red card) 77'; Ammari (yellow card) 57'	Report	Rondón (yellow card) 10'; André Micael (yellow card) 21'; Ivanov (yellow card) 59'; Bușu (yellow card) 73'; Yazalde 87'	Stadium: Ion Comșa; Attendance: 1,500; Referee: Sebastian Colțescu

2 June 2019 14	Gaz Metan Mediaș	3–1	Concordia Chiajna	Mediaș
	Rondón 1' 6'; Yazalde 37'	Report	Fota (yellow card) 30'; Bărboianu (yellow card) 38'; Gorobsov 45' (yellow card) 67'; Ivanovici (yellow card) 80'	Stadium: Gaz Metan; Attendance: 1,000; Referee: Florin Mazilu

=== Cupa României ===
Gaz Metan Mediaș will enter the Cupa României at the Round of 32.

27 September 2018 Round of 32	Bucovina Rădăuți	1–1 (a.e.t.) (7–8 p)	Gaz Metan Mediaș	Rădăuți
16:30	Vasile Vițu 83'; Ionel Stoian (yellow card) 84'; Bălan (yellow card) 90+2'; Vlad Stănescu (yellow card) 113'	Report	Chamed (yellow card) 57'; Fofana (yellow card) 64'; Romeo (yellow card) 66'; Stancu (yellow card) 88'; Yazalde 90+2'	Stadium: Stadionul Municipal; Attendance: 2,000; Referee: Rare Vidican

31 October 2018 Round of 16	Gaz Metan Mediaș	0–1	CFR Cluj	Mediaș
21:45	Crețu (yellow card) 26'; Fofana (yellow card) 29' (red card) 90+4'; Pleșca (red card) 32'; Ivanov (yellow card) 37'; Bușu (yellow card) 80'	Report	Omrani (yellow card) 26'; Țucudean 64'	Stadium: Stadionul Gaz Metan; Attendance: 2,000; Referee: Marius Avram

== See also ==
- 2018–19 Cupa României
- 2018–19 Liga I
