= 2018–19 FC Voluntari season =

Voluntari
2018–19 season
- Chairman: Ioan Andone
- Manager: Cristiano Bergodi
- Stadium: Anghel Iordănescu
- Cupa României: Round of 16

The 2018–19 season will be the 9th season of competitive football by Voluntari, and the 4th consecutive in Liga I. Voluntari will compete in the Liga I and in Cupa României.

== Previous season positions ==
	Competition	Position
(Romania)	Liga I	12th
(Romania)	Cupa României	Round of 32

== Pre-season and friendlies ==
Win Draw Loss

5 July 2018 Friendly	(Hungary) Puskás Akadémia	1–1	(Romania) Voluntari	Bakovci
19:00		Summary		Stadium: ŠRC Bakovci

== Competitions ==
Win Draw Loss

=== Overview ===
Competition	First match	Last match	Starting round	Final position	Record							
Competition	First match	Last match	Starting round	Final position	Pld	W	D	L	GF	GA	GD	Win %
Liga I	23 July 2018	–	Matchday 1	–	22	3	7	12	25	42	−17	13.64
Cupa României	October 2018	October 2018	Round of 32	Round of 16	2	1	0	1	2	4	−2	50.00
Total					24	4	7	13	27	46	−19	16.67

Last updated: 13 July 2018
Source: Competitions

=== Liga I ===
The Liga I fixture list was announced on 5 July 2018.

==== Regular season ====
===== Table =====
Pos	Team	Pld	W	D	L	GF	GA	GD	Pts	Qualification
10	Hermannstadt	26	9	5	12	25	28	−3	32	Qualification for the Relegation round
11	Gaz Metan Mediaș	26	7	10	9	25	32	−7	31	Qualification for the Relegation round
12	Dunărea Călărași	26	4	12	10	16	25	−9	24	Qualification for the Relegation round
13	Voluntari	26	4	9	13	30	46	−16	21	Qualification for the Relegation round
14	Concordia Chiajna	26	4	6	16	19	45	−26	18	Qualification for the Relegation round

Source: LPF (in Romanian), Soccerway
Rules for classification: 1) Points; 2) Head-to-head points; 3) Head-to-head goal difference; 4) Head-to-head goals scored; 5) Goal difference; 6) Goals scored; 7) Play-off.

===== Results summary =====
Overall								Home						Away					
Pld	W	D	L	GF	GA	GD	Pts	W	D	L	GF	GA	GD	W	D	L	GF	GA	GD
26	4	9	13	30	46	−16	21	3	5	5	20	20	0	1	4	8	10	26	−16

Last updated: 2 March 2019.
Source: Liga I

===== Results by round =====
Round	1	2	3	4	5	6	7	8	9	10	11	12	13	14	15	16	17	18	19	20	21	22	23	24	25	26
Ground	A	H	A	H	A	H	A	H	A	H	A	H	A	H	A	H	A	H	A	H	A	H	A	H	A	H
Result	L	D	L	L	L	L	D	L	D	D	D	W	L	L	L	L	L	W	L	D	D	W	L	D	W	D
Position	10	11	14	14	14	14	14	14	14	14	14	14	14	14	14	14	14	14	14	14	14	14	14	13	13	13

Updated to match(es) played on 2 March 2019. Source: Liga I
A = Away; H = Home; W = Win; D = Draw; L = Loss

===== Matches =====
Win Draw Loss

22 July 2018 1	Dinamo București	2–1	FC Voluntari	Bucharest
21:00 EEST (UTC+3)	R.Moldoveanu (yellow card) 55'; Salomão 61'; D.Sorescu 75'	Report	Ciucur (yellow card) 49'; Ricardinho 57'	Stadium: Dinamo; Attendance: 2,681; Referee: Alexandru Tudor (Bucharest)

30 July 2018 2	FC Voluntari	1–1	Gaz Metan Mediaș	Voluntari
18:00 EEST (UTC+3)	Belahmeur 3' (yellow card) 90+1'; Ciucur (yellow card) 49'	Report	Fortes 18'; I.Cristea (yellow card) 45+3'	Stadium: Anghel Iordănescu; Attendance: 400; Referee: Horia Gabriel Mladinovici

6 August 2018 3	Viitorul Constanța	2–0	FC Voluntari	Ovidiu
18:00 EEST (UTC+3)	Țîru (yellow card) 11'; I.Vînă 69' (pen.); A.Artean (yellow card) 73'; D.Drăguș 79'	Report	Artabe (yellow card) 4'; Laïdouni (yellow card) 39'; Răuță (yellow card) 44'; A.Bălan (yellow card) 44'; Zgrablić (yellow card) 68'; Căpățînă (yellow card) 90'	Stadium: Viitorul; Attendance: 2,000; Referee: Marcel Bîrsan (Bucharest)

12 August 2018 4	FC Voluntari	1–2	CFR Cluj	Voluntari
18:00 EEST (UTC+3)	Laïdouni 12' (pen.); Bucurică (yellow card) 79'	Report	A.C.Ioniță 34'; Omrani (yellow card) 39'; S.Mailat (yellow card) 45'; Culio (yellow card) 77'; Țucudean 84'; Camora (yellow card) 88'; D.Djoković (yellow card) 89'	Stadium: Anghel Iordănescu; Attendance: 300; Referee: Cătălin Popa

20 August 2018 5	Hermannstadt	4–0	FC Voluntari	Târgu Mureș
18:00 EEST (UTC+3)	D.Tătar (yellow card) 10' (goal) 38'; Mijušković (yellow card) 22'; Tsoumou 29', 34'; C.Pîrvulescu 68'; Dandea (yellow card) 75'	Report	Artabe (yellow card) 39'; Ciucur (yellow card) 50'; Drăghia (red card) 51'	Stadium: Trans-Sil; Attendance: 300; Referee: Horațiu Feșnic (Cluj)

27 August 2018 6	FC Voluntari	1–5	Universitatea Craiova	Voluntari
21:00 EEST (UTC+3)	Ricardinho (yellow card) 67'; Laïdouni 86' (pen.); Căpățînă (yellow card) 90+1'	Report	Bancu 24', 42', 88' (pen.); Kelić 28'; A.Mitriță 40'; Cicâldău (yellow card) 84'	Stadium: Anghel Iordănescu; Attendance: 2,500; Referee: Marius Avram

1 September 2018 7	Astra Giurgiu	0–0	FC Voluntari	Giurgiu
18:30 EEST (UTC+3)	Alibec (yellow card) 61'; Erico (yellow card) 90+1'	Report	Căpățînă (yellow card) 44'; Balaur (yellow card) 51'; Răuță (yellow card) 80'; Ricardinho (yellow card) 90+2'	Stadium: Marin Anastasovici; Attendance: 300; Referee: Florin Andrei

16 September 2018 8	FC Voluntari	2–3	Politehnica Iași	Voluntari
18:00 EEST (UTC+3)	Căpățînă 56'; Malfleury 79'; Balaur (yellow card) 90+3'	Report	Cioinac 13'; A.Sin 38' (yellow card) 46'; M.Mihăescu 90+4'	Stadium: Anghel Iordănescu; Attendance: 200; Referee: Marian Alexandru Barbu

21 September 2018 9	Sepsi Sfântu Gheorghe	1–1	FC Voluntari	Sfântu Gheorghe
18:00 EEST (UTC+3)	St.Velev (yellow card) 22'; Tandia (yellow card) 41' (goal) 90+6'; I.Fülöp (yellow card) 87'	Report	Malfleury 28'; Ricardinho (yellow card) 30'; Căpățînă (yellow card) 48'; A.Vlad (yellow card) 65'; Laïdouni (yellow card) 90+4'; C.Vâtcă (yellow card) 90+5'	Stadium: Municipal; Attendance: 3,500; Referee: George Cătălin Găman

29 September 2018 10	FC Voluntari	1–1	FC Botoșani	Voluntari
19:15 EEST (UTC+3)	Bucurică (yellow card) 29'; Laïdouni 36' (pen.) (yellow card) 44'; Malfleury (yellow card) 38' (yellow-red card) 51'; Răuță (yellow card) 90+4'	Report	Chindriș (yellow card) 26'; Patache (yellow card) 35'; A.Burcă (yellow card) 62'; Chitoșcă 80'	Stadium: Anghel Iordănescu; Attendance: 300; Referee: Sebastian Colțescu

7 October 2018 11	Dunărea Călărași	1–1	FC Voluntari	Călărași
14:00 EEST (UTC+3)	Ndiaye 34' (yellow card) 84'; Walace (yellow card) 42'	Report	Răuță (yellow card) 7'; Balaur (yellow card) 22'; Ricardinho 79'	Stadium: Ion Comșa; Attendance: 2,840; Referee: Marius Avram

19 October 2018 12	FC Voluntari	4–0	Concordia Chiajna	Voluntari
18:00 EEST (UTC+3)	I.Armaș 22'; Gadze 33'; Căpățînă 46' (yellow card) 55'; Bucurică (yellow card) 55'; Malfleury (yellow card) 59'; Belahmeur (yellow card) 62'; Kabasele 89'	Report	Batin (yellow card) 43'; A.Marc (yellow card) 55'; Bawab (yellow card) 55'; Bărboianu (yellow card) 76' (yellow-red card) 81'	Stadium: Anghel Iordănescu; Attendance: 800; Referee: Horațiu Feșnic (Cluj)

27 October 2018 13	FCSB	2–1	FC Voluntari	Bucharest
21:00 EEST (UTC+3)	Gnohéré 52', 76'	Report	Tudorie 85'	Stadium: Arena Națională; Attendance: 2,500; Referee: Adrian Viorel Cojocaru

5 November 2018 14	FC Voluntari	0–1	Dinamo București	Voluntari
21:00 EET (UTC+2)	Zgrablić (yellow card) 12' (yellow-red card) 90+3'; Hodorogea (yellow card) 61'	Report	Hanca (yellow card) 23'; Katsikas (yellow card) 26'; D.Sorescu (yellow card) 73'; Salomão 90+4' (pen.)	Stadium: Anghel Iordănescu; Attendance: 1,300; Referee: Cătălin Popa

12 November 2018 15	Gaz Metan Mediaș	2–0	FC Voluntari	Mediaș
21:00 EET (UTC+2)	I.Cristea (yellow card) 1'; Fofana 10'; M.Constantin 40' (pen.); D.Olaru (yellow card) 75'	Report	Răuță (yellow card) 37'; Căpățînă (yellow card) 54'	Stadium: Gaz Metan; Attendance: 500; Referee: Horațiu Feșnic (Cluj)

25 November 2018 16	FC Voluntari	1–2	Viitorul Constanța	Voluntari
17:30 EET (UTC+2)	Tudorie 66'	Report	S.Mladen 21' (yellow card) 27'; I.Vînă (yellow card) 55'; T.Băluță (yellow card) 72' (yellow-red card) 74'; V.Ghiță 84'	Stadium: Anghel Iordănescu; Attendance: 300; Referee: George Rădulescu

30 November 2018 17	CFR Cluj	5–0	FC Voluntari	Cluj-Napoca
20:00 EET (UTC+2)	Omrani (yellow card) 10'; Țucudean 26', 56', 62'; C.Manea 85'; V.Costache 89'	Report	Răuță (yellow card) 53'	Stadium: Dr. Constantin Rădulescu; Attendance: 1,000; Referee: George Cătălin Găman

4 December 2018 18	FC Voluntari	2–0	Hermannstadt	Voluntari
17:30 EET (UTC+2)	Gadze 52', 65'	Report	Dandea (yellow card) 58'; Acsinte (yellow card) 60'; P.Petrescu (yellow card) 77'	Stadium: Anghel Iordănescu; Attendance: 150; Referee: Horia Gabriel Mladinovici

10 December 2018 19	Universitatea Craiova	3–1	FC Voluntari	Craiova
20:00 EET (UTC+2)	Koljić 26'; A.Mitriță (yellow card) 40' (goal) 45+2' (pen.); Nuno Rocha 90+1'	Report	Laïdouni (yellow card) 7' (yellow-red card) 89'; Gadze 11'; Răuță (yellow card) 33'	Stadium: Ion Oblemenco; Attendance: 6,000; Referee: Adrian Comănescu

15 December 2018 20	FC Voluntari	1–1	Astra Giurgiu	Voluntari
14:00 EET (UTC+2)	Hodorogea 50'; Ricardinho (yellow card) 79'	Report	Zoua (yellow card) 19'; Mrzljak (yellow card) 77'; Belu-Iordache 85'; Alibec (red card) 90+3'	Stadium: Anghel Iordănescu; Attendance: 30; Referee: Ionuţ Coza

21 December 2018 21	Politehnica Iași	2–2	FC Voluntari	Iași
17:30 EET (UTC+2)	D.Flores 45+1' (yellow card) 60'; Frăsinescu (yellow card) 55'; L.Enoh 88'; O.Mihalache (yellow card) 90'; Qaka (yellow card) 90+1'	Report	Tudorie 56', 59' (pen.); Laïdouni (yellow card) 69'; A.Vlad (yellow card) 85'; Răuță (yellow card) 90'	Stadium: Emil Alexandrescu; Attendance: 1,000; Referee: Adrian Viorel Cojocaru

2 February 2019 22	Voluntari	4–2	Sepsi Sfântu Gheorghe	Voluntari
EET (UTC+2)				Stadium: Anghel Iordănescu

11 February 2019 23	Botoșani	1–0	Voluntari	Botoșani
17:00 EET (UTC+2)	Roman 45' (yellow card) 57'; Ongenda (yellow card) 54'; Dumitraș (yellow card) 59'; Soiledis (yellow card) 90+3'; Pap (yellow card) 90+6'	Report	Laïdouni (yellow card) 56'; Tudorie (yellow card) 90+3'; Petrariu (yellow card) 90+3'	Stadium: Municipal; Attendance: 1,500; Referee: George Rădulescu

17 February 2019 24	Voluntari	0–0	Dunărea Călărași	Voluntari
15:00 EET (UTC+2)	Armaș (yellow card) 19'; Krasniqi (yellow card) 80'	Report	Vlădoiu (yellow card) 10'	Stadium: Anghel Iordănescu; Attendance: 600; Referee: Andrei Chivulete

25 February 2019 25	Concordia Chiajna	v	Voluntari	Chiajna
EET (UTC+2)				Stadium: Concordia

3 March 2019 26	Voluntari	v	FCSB	Voluntari
EET (UTC+2)				Stadium: Anghel Iordănescu

==== Relegation round ====
===== Table =====
Pos	Team	Pld	W	D	L	GF	GA	GD	Pts	Qualification or relegation
7	Gaz Metan Mediaș	14	10	2	2	25	9	+16	48	
8	Botoșani	14	8	2	4	18	9	+9	44	
9	Dinamo București	14	8	3	3	16	7	+9	43	
10	Politehnica Iași	14	3	5	6	12	18	−6	31	
11	Voluntari	14	5	5	4	14	16	−2	31	
12	Hermannstadt (O)	14	2	5	7	9	19	−10	27	Qualification for the relegation play-offs
13	Dunărea Călărași (R)	14	3	4	7	8	18	−10	25	Relegation to Liga II
14	Concordia Chiajna (R)	14	2	4	8	17	23	−6	19	Relegation to Liga II

Source: Soccerway
Rules for classification: 1) Points; 2) Points without rounding; 3) Head-to-head points; 4) Head-to-head goal difference; 5) Head-to-head goals scored; 6) Goal difference; 7) Goals scored; 8) Play-off (only if needed to decide teams for relegation). (Note: only criteria 6 and 7 are applied to establish the classification during the competition.)
(O) Play-off winners; (R) Relegated

===== Results summary =====
Overall								Home						Away					
Pld	W	D	L	GF	GA	GD	Pts	W	D	L	GF	GA	GD	W	D	L	GF	GA	GD
0	0	0	0	0	0	0	0	0	0	0	0	0	0	0	0	0	0	0	0

Last updated: 8 March 2019.
Source: Liga I

===== Position by round =====
Round	1	2	3	4	5	6	7	8	9	10	11	12	13	14
Ground	A	H	A	A	H	A	H	H	A	H	H	A	H	A
Result														
Position														

Updated to match(es) played on 8 March 2019. Source: Liga I
A = Away; H = Home; W = Win; D = Draw; L = Loss

===== Matches =====
Win Draw Loss

8 March 2019 1	Politehnica Iași	v	Voluntari	Iași
				Stadium: Emil Alexandrescu

15 March 2019 2	Voluntari	v	Botoșani	Voluntari
				Stadium: Anghel Iordănescu

29 March 2019 3	Concordia Chiajna	v	Voluntari	Chiajna
				Stadium: Concordia

5 April 2019 4	Dunărea Călărași	v	Voluntari	Călărași
				Stadium: Ion Comșa

12 April 2019 5	Voluntari	v	Gaz Metan Mediaș	Voluntari
				Stadium: Anghel Iordănescu

19 April 2019 6	Hermannstadt	v	Voluntari	Sibiu
				Stadium: Municipal

26 April 2019 7	Voluntari	v	Dinamo București	Voluntari
				Stadium: Anghel Iordănescu

3 May 2019 8	Voluntari	v	Politehnica Iași	Voluntari
				Stadium: Anghel Iordănescu

10 May 2019 9	Botoșani	v	Voluntari	Botoșani
				Stadium: Municipal

17 May 2019 10	Voluntari	v	Concordia Chiajna	Voluntari
				Stadium: Anghel Iordănescu

24 May 2019 11	Voluntari	v	Dunărea Călărași	Voluntari
				Stadium: Anghel Iordănescu

31 May 2019 12	Gaz Metan Mediaș	v	Voluntari	Mediaș
				Stadium: Gaz Metan

7 June 2019 13	Voluntari	v	Hermannstadt	Voluntari
				Stadium: Anghel Iordănescu

14 June 2019 14	Dinamo București	v	Voluntari	Bucharest
				Stadium: Dinamo

=== Cupa României ===
Voluntari will enter the Cupa României at the Round of 32.

25 September 2018 Round of 32	Voluntari	2–1	Botoșani	Voluntari
16:00	Zgrablić (yellow card) 34'; Belahmeur 38'; Tudorie 41'; Laïdouni (yellow card) 42'; Răuță (yellow card) 48'; Vlad (yellow card) 58'	Summary	Karaboué (yellow card) 10'; Oaidă (yellow card) 23'; Miron (yellow card) 33' (yellow-red card) 54'; Piftor (yellow card) 45+2' (yellow-red card) 52'; Chitoșcă 46'; Chindriș (yellow card) 72'	Stadium: Stadionul Anghel Iordănescu; Attendance: 100; Referee: Sorin Antonie

30 October 2018 Round of 16	Hermannstadt	3–0	Voluntari	Târgu Mureș
16:30	Antonov (yellow card) 24'; Nkololo 38'; Petrescu 51' (pen.); Pedro Moreira (yellow card) 78'; Kuca 90'	Summary	Belaur (yellow card) 26'; Armaș (yellow card) 75'; Răuță (yellow card) 84'; Hodorogea (yellow card) 85'	Stadium: Stadionul Trans-Sil; Attendance: 100; Referee: Ionu Coza

== See also ==
- 2018–19 Cupa României
- 2018–19 Liga I
