= Ion Gheorghe (footballer) =

Romanian footballer (born 1999)

Personal information
- Date of birth: 8 October 1999 (age 27)
- Place of birth: Călăraşi, Romania
- Height: 1.74 m (5 ft 9 in)
- Position: Midfielder

Team information
- Current team: Voluntari
- Number: 8

Youth career
- 2013–2015: Team București
- 2015–2017: Dinamo București

Senior career*
Years	Team	Apps	(Gls)
2015–2017	Dinamo București II		
2017–2018	Dinamo București	4	(0)
2018–2022	Voluntari	144	(14)
2022–2024	Sepsi OSK	51	(3)
2024	→ Stal Mielec (loan)	7	(0)
2024–2025	Gloria Buzău	19	(0)
2025–	Voluntari	40	(4)

International career
2017	Romania U18	3	(0)
2018	Romania U19	2	(0)
2021	Romania Olympic	3	(0)
- * Club domestic league appearances and goals as of 2 November 2026

Ion Gheorghe (born 8 October 1999) is a Romanian professional footballer who plays as a midfielder for Liga I club Voluntari, which he captains.

== Club career ==
Gheorghe joined Voluntari from fellow Liga I team Dinamo București in August 2018.

On 19 May 2022, he was left out of the squad to play Sepsi OSK in the Cupa României final after having previously agreed to join the opponent club upon the expiration of his contract with Voluntari.

On 19 February 2024, Gheorghe joined Polish side Stal Mielec on loan for the remainder of the season, with an option to make the move permanent. He made seven appearances for the club before returning to Sepsi after the season.

== Career statistics ==
As of match played 2 November 2026

Appearances and goals by club, season and competition
Club	Season	League			National cup (Note: Includes Cupa României)		Europe		Other		Total	
Club	Season	Division	Apps	Goals	Apps	Goals	Apps	Goals	Apps	Goals	Apps	Goals
Dinamo București II	2015–16	Liga III	?	?	1	0	—		—		1	0
Dinamo București II	2016–17	Liga III	?	?	3	1	—		—		3	1
Dinamo București II	Total		?	?	4	1	0	0	0	0	4	1
Dinamo București	2017–18	Liga I	4	0	0	0	0	0	—		4	0
Voluntari	2018–19	Liga I	33	0	1	0	—		—		34	0
Voluntari	2019–20	Liga I	38	4	2	0	—		—		40	4
Voluntari	2020–21	Liga I	38	5	1	0	—		2 (Note: Appearances in Liga I promotion/relegation play-offs)	0	41	5
Voluntari	2021–22	Liga I	35	5	2	0	—		—		37	5
Voluntari	Total		144	14	6	0	—		2	0	152	14
Sepsi OSK	2022–23	Liga I	30	2	5	1	3 (Note: Appearances in UEFA Europa Conference League)	0	1 (Note: Appearance in Supercupa României)	0	39	3
Sepsi OSK	2023–24	Liga I	21	1	3	1	6	0	1	1	31	3
Sepsi OSK	Total		51	3	8	2	9	0	2	1	70	6
Stal Mielec (loan)	2023–24	Ekstraklasa	7	0	—		—		—		7	0
Gloria Buzău	2024–25	Liga I	19	0	1	0	—		—		20	0
Voluntari	2025–26	Liga II	26	4	1	0	—		2	0	29	4
Voluntari	2026–27	Liga I	14	0	3	0	—		—		17	0
Voluntari	Total		40	4	4	0	—		2	0	46	4
Career total			265	21	23	3	9	0	6	1	303	25

== Honours ==
Sepsi OSK

- Cupa României: 2022–23
- Supercupa României: 2022, 2023
