= Alberto Cobrea =

Romanian professional footballer

Personal information
- Date of birth: 1 November 1990 (age 36)
- Place of birth: Meppen, Germany
- Height: 1.89 m (6 ft 2 1/2 in)
- Position: Goalkeeper

Team information
- Current team: FC U Craiova
- Number: 22

Youth career
- 1997–2007: LPS "Olimpia" Piatra-Neamț
- 2007–2010: Udinese Calcio

Senior career*
Years	Team	Apps	(Gls)
2011–2012	Mioveni	10	(0)
2012–2014	Concordia Chiajna	13	(0)
2014–2016	Petrolul Ploiești	19	(0)
2016–2017	Dinamo București	0	(0)
2017–2018	Botoșani	48	(0)
2018–2020	Politehnica Iași	5	(0)
2020–2021	CSM Reșița	27	(0)
2021–2022	FC U Craiova	1	(0)
Total		123	(0)

International career^{‡}
2007–2009	Romania U-19	9	(0)
- * Club domestic league appearances and goals as of 16 May 2022 ‡ National team caps and goals as of 21 May 2016

Alberto Cobrea (born 1 November 1990) is a Romanian professional footballer who plays as a goalkeeper for FC U Craiova 1948.

== Honours ==
Individual

- Liga I Best Goalkeeper: 2017–18 (shared Giedrius Arlauskis & Jaime Penedo)
