= Giedrius Arlauskis =

Lithuanian professional footballer

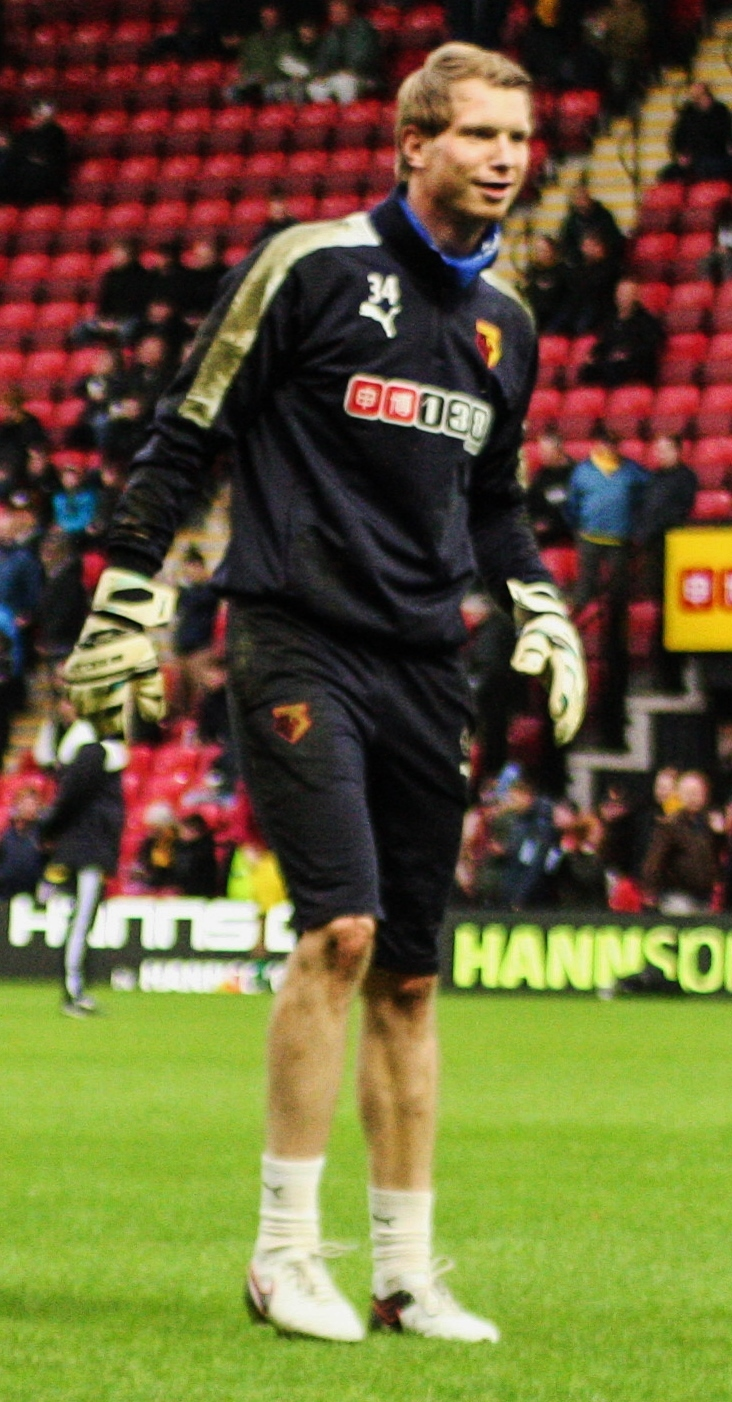
- Arlauskis with Watford in 2015

Personal information
- Full name: Giedrius Arlauskis
- Date of birth: 1 December 1987 (age 38)
- Place of birth: Telšiai, Lithuanian SSR, Soviet Union
- Height: 1.92 m (6 ft 4 in)
- Position: Goalkeeper

Youth career
- Mastis Telšiai

Senior career*
Years	Team	Apps	(Gls)
2005–2007	FK Šiauliai	40	(0)
2008–2010	Unirea Urziceni	55	(0)
2010–2014	Rubin Kazan	7	(0)
2014–2015	Steaua București	25	(0)
2015–2017	Watford	1	(0)
2016	→ Espanyol (loan)	3	(0)
2017–2020	CFR Cluj	85	(0)
2020–2021	Al-Shabab	8	(0)
2021	CFR Cluj	8	(0)
2022–2023	Universitatea Craiova	7	(0)
Total		239	(0)

International career
2008–2015	Lithuania	23	(0)
- * Club domestic league appearances and goals

Giedrius Arlauskis (born 1 December 1987) is a Lithuanian former professional footballer who played as a goalkeeper.

Arlauskis started out as a senior at FK Šiauliai, before moving to Romanian side Unirea Urziceni in 2008. He is one of the most decorated players of the Liga I, having won seven Romanian league titles with Urziceni, Steaua București and CFR Cluj combined. Apart from his native Lithuania and the latter country, Arlauskis represented teams in Russia, England, Spain and Saudi Arabia, respectively.

At international level, Arlauskis earned 23 caps for Lithuania between 2008 and 2015.

== Club career ==
=== Early career / Unirea Urziceni ===
Born in Telšiai, Arlauskis started his youth career at Mastis Telšiai before moving on to Šiauliai, starting his professional career. In two seasons at Šiauliai, Arlauskis made 34 appearances for the club.

In January 2008 he moved to Romania, joining Unirea Urziceni for €150K, as a replacement for Bogdan Stelea. On 24 March 2008 he made his debut in the Liga I, playing 90 minutes in a 0–0 draw against Ceahlăul Piatra Neamț. In his first half of the season at Unirea Urziceni, Arlauskis made four appearances for the club. The 2008–09 season proved to be Arlauskis' breakthrough at Unirea Urziceni and he went on to make 32 appearances in all competitions. At the end of the season, with the club winning the Liga I, Arlauskis was voted as the league's goalkeeper of the season and was listed in the league's 2008–09 Team of the Year.

In 2009–10 season, Arklauskis continued to be the first choice goalkeeper at Unirea Urziceni and played five out of six matches in Champions League Group Stage. However, Arlauskis struggled to maintain a place in the first team, citing injuries and only made 27 appearances for the club.

=== Rubin Kazan ===
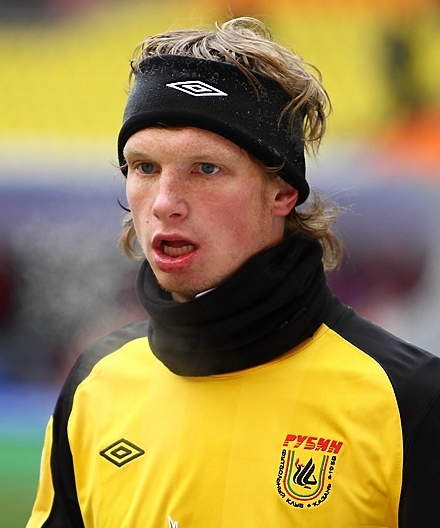
Arklauskis during his time in Russia with Rubin Kazan.

After making three league appearances for Unirea Urziceni at the start of the season, Arlauskis moved to Russia, joining Rubin Kazan on a four-year contract worth €2 million. Arlauskis was also close to a move to Dynamo Moscow.

Arlauskis made his Rubin Kazan debut on 20 November 2010 in a 2–2 draw against Zenit Saint Petersburg. Arlauskis made his European debut at Rubin Kazan in a 2–0 loss against Twente. In the 2011–12 season, Arlauskis made three league appearances for the club, followed by three appearances for the club in all competitions in the 2012–13 season. Arlauskis was unable to established himself as the first choice goalkeeper and was the second choice goalkeeper behind Sergey Ryzhikov.

At the end of the 2013–14 season, Arlauskis was told by the club that his contract would not be renewed. Upon leaving Rubin Kazan, Arlauskis said he regret joining the club, saying it had been a wrong choice motivated by money.

=== Steaua București ===
After four years in Russia, Arlauskis joined FC Steaua București on 10 June 2014, as a replacement for Ciprian Tătărușanu who had left for Fiorentina. Arlauskis was unveiled at a press conference the next day and was given number twenty-four shirt.

After being named on the team in six matches in the Champions League Qualifying, Arlauskis made his FCSB debut on 26 July 2014, in a 3–1 win over Rapid București. Arlauskis was in goal for the Champions League Qualification Second Leg against Ludogorets Razgrad. The club lost on penalties after Arlauskis saved one of the seven penalties in the shoot-out, resulting in the club playing in the Europa League. In the Eternal derby between FCSB and Dinamo București, Arlauskis was in goal when rival supporters threw a firecracker at him in the 82nd minute. After receiving help from the club's doctor he went on to play the full 90 minutes in a 3–0 victory.

His good display at FCSB București throughout 2014 earned him a Lithuanian Footballer of the Year award. However, Arlauskis rejected a new contract with the club, leading to him being linked with a move to Fiorentina and Roma, as his contract was due to expire at the end of the 2014–15 season. As a result, the club would leave him out of the squad for important matches, including against Rapid București. Despite this, Arlauskis remained the first choice goalkeeper at FCSB București, despite announcing he would be leaving the club at the end of the season.

Arlauskis ended the season with 25 league appearances after being sent-off in the 47th minute of a 3–1 loss against CS Pandurii Târgu Jiu on 3 May 2015. Arlauskis missed the rest of the season because of injury concerns and being on the bench. The club went on to win the Liga I, Cupa României and Cupa Ligii, achieving a treble.

=== Watford ===
After one season at FCSB, Arlauskis joined Watford on a free transfer on 4 June 2015, signing a 4-year contract. Upon joining the club, he was given a number 34 shirt ahead of the new season with the name "Arla" on the back.

Arlauskis made his Watford debut against Preston North End in the League Cup on 25 August 2015. Arlauskis made his Premier League debut on 28 November 2015, replacing the injured Heurelho Gomes in the 67th minute during Watford's 3–2 win at Aston Villa. Reflecting on his debut, Arlauskis described the match as "really hard, the hardest ten minutes of [his] life. It felt much longer than ten minutes." Following Gomes' return to the first team, Arlauskis returned to the substitute bench and soon lost his first team place following the arrival of Costel Pantilimon.

However, upon returning to Watford in the 2016–17 season, Arlauskis remained out of the first team squad throughout the season. But following Pantilimon's injury, he was called to the 25-man squad, but remained on the substitute bench. Following the arrival of new manager Marco Silva ahead of the 2017–18 season, he left Watford by mutual consent.

==== Loan to Espanyol ====
On 29 January 2016, Arlauskis joined Spanish side Espanyol on a 5 months loan from Watford, with an option to buy, being reunited with his former FCSB manager, Constantin Gâlcă.

Arlauskis made his La Liga debut two days later, in a 0–6 defeat to Real Madrid. He later conceded two goals in the followed up match on 8 February 2016, in a 5–0 defeat to Real Sociedad. During the match, he tore his rupture in the abductor in his right leg, resulting his substitution and was sidelined throughout February. Although he remained as a second-choice goalkeeper behind Pau López, Arlauskis was able to make another appearance on 22 April 2016, in a 4–0 defeat to Las Palmas on 22 April 2016.

At the end of the season, making three appearances for the side, the club turned down to exercise the right to purchase Arlauskis on a permanent basis, allowing him to return to his parent club.

=== CFR Cluj ===
After leaving Watford, Arlauskis was speculated over the transfer move return to Romania, joining CFR Cluj. The move was confirmed on 15 August 2017.

== International career ==
In August 2008, Arlauskis' performance in Romania led him being called by the Lithuania for the first time. Arlauskis made his national team debut as a substitute against Moldova in a friendly game on 19 November 2008. He joined the game in the 46th minute and conceded a goal after 67 minutes as Lithuania drew with Moldova 1–1.

After playing two more caps as a substitute, his first competitive game then came on 18 June 2010, when Lithuania played a goalless draw with Latvia in the Baltic Cup.

== Personal life ==
Arlauskis brother, Davydas is also a footballer. Other than speaking Lithuanian, Arlauskis speaks Romanian and English.

Growing up in Telšiai, Lithuania, Arlauskis initially played as a defender before being switched to a goalkeeper by his coach. Arlauskis is a keen fisherman, having caught a fish weighing 21.7 kg.

== Career statistics ==
=== Club ===
Appearances and goals by club, season and competition
Club	Season	League			National cup (Note: Includes Cupa României, Russian Cup, King's Cup)		League cup (Note: Includes Cupa Ligii, EFL Cup)		Continental		Other		Total	
Club	Season	Division	Apps	Goals	Apps	Goals	Apps	Goals	Apps	Goals	Apps	Goals	Apps	Goals
Šiauliai	2005	A Lyga	8	0	0	0	—		—		—		8	0
Šiauliai	2006	A Lyga	13	0	0	0	—		—		—		13	0
Šiauliai	2007	A Lyga	19	0	0	0	—		—		—		19	0
Šiauliai	Total		40	0	0	0	—		—		—		40	0
Unirea Urziceni	2007–08	Liga I	4	0	0	0	—		—		—		4	0
Unirea Urziceni	2008–09	Liga I	30	0	1	0	—		2 (Note: Appearance(s) in UEFA Cup/UEFA Europa League)	0	—		33	0
Unirea Urziceni	2009–10	Liga I	18	0	0	0	—		7 (Note: Five appearances in UEFA Champions League, two appearances in UEFA Europa League)	0	0	0	25	0
Unirea Urziceni	2010–11	Liga I	3	0	0	0	—		2 (Note: Appearances in UEFA Champions League)	0	1 (Note: Appearance in Supercupa României)	0	6	0
Unirea Urziceni	Total		55	0	1	0	—		11	0	1	0	68	0
Rubin Kazan	2010	Russian Premier League	2	0	0	0	—		1	0	—		3	0
Rubin Kazan	2011–12	Russian Premier League	3	0	0	0	—		2	0	—		5	0
Rubin Kazan	2012–13	Russian Premier League	2	0	0	0	—		1	0	—		3	0
Rubin Kazan	2013–14	Russian Premier League	0	0	1	0	—		4	0	—		5	0
Rubin Kazan	Total		7	0	1	0	—		8	0	—		16	0
Steaua București	2014–15	Liga I	25	0	1	0	1	0	12 (Note: Six appearances in UEFA Champions League, six appearances in UEFA Europa League)	0	1	0	40	0
Watford	2015–16	Premier League	1	0	0	0	1	0	—		—		2	0
Watford	2016–17	Premier League	0	0	0	0	0	0	—		—		0	0
Watford	Total		1	0	0	0	1	0	—		—		2	0
Espanyol (loan)	2015–16	La Liga	3	0	0	0	—		—		—		3	0
CFR Cluj	2017–18	Liga I	26	0	0	0	—		—		—		26	0
CFR Cluj	2018–19	Liga I	31	0	0	0	—		4 (Note: Two appearances in UEFA Champions League, two appearances in UEFA Europa League)	0	1	0	36	0
CFR Cluj	2019–20	Liga I	28	0	0	0	—		16 (Note: Eight appearances in UEFA Champions League, eight appearances in UEFA Europa League)	0	1	0	45	0
CFR Cluj	Total		85	0	0	0	—		20	0	2	0	107	0
Al Shabab	2020–21	Saudi Pro League	8	0	1	0	—		1 (Note: Appearance in Arab Club Champions Cup)	0	0	0	10	0
CFR Cluj	2020–21	Liga I	6	0	0	0	—		0	0	1	0	7	0
CFR Cluj	2021–22	Liga I	2	0	0	0	—		8 (Note: Six appearances in UEFA Champions League, two appearances in UEFA Europa League)	0	1	0	11	0
CFR Cluj	Total		8	0	0	0	—		8	0	2	0	18	0
Universitatea Craiova	2022–23	Liga I	7	0	0	0	—		—		—		7	0
Career total			239	0	4	0	2	0	60	0	6	0	311	0

=== International ===
Appearances and goals by national team and year
National team	Year	Apps	Goals
Lithuania	2008	1	0
Lithuania	2009	1	0
Lithuania	2010	3	0
Lithuania	2011	0	0
Lithuania	2012	2	0
Lithuania	2013	4	0
Lithuania	2014	8	0
Lithuania	2015	4	0
Total		23	0

== Honours ==
Unirea Urziceni

- Liga I: 2008–09

Rubin Kazan

- Russian Cup: 2011–12
- Russian Super Cup: 2012

Steaua București

- Liga I: 2014–15
- Cupa României: 2014–15
- Cupa Ligii: 2014–15

CFR Cluj

- Liga I: 2017–18, 2018–19, 2019–20, 2020–21, 2021–22
- Supercupa României: 2018, 2020

Lithuania

- Baltic Cup: 2010

Individual

- Lithuanian Footballer of the Year: 2014,
- Liga I Team of the Season: 2017–18, 2019–20,
- Liga I Team of the Championship play-offs: 2017–18, 2018–19,
- Liga I Best Goalkeeper: 2017–18 (shared Alberto Cobrea & Jaime Penedo), 2018–19, 2019–20,
