= Marius Constantin =

Romanian footballer (born 1984)

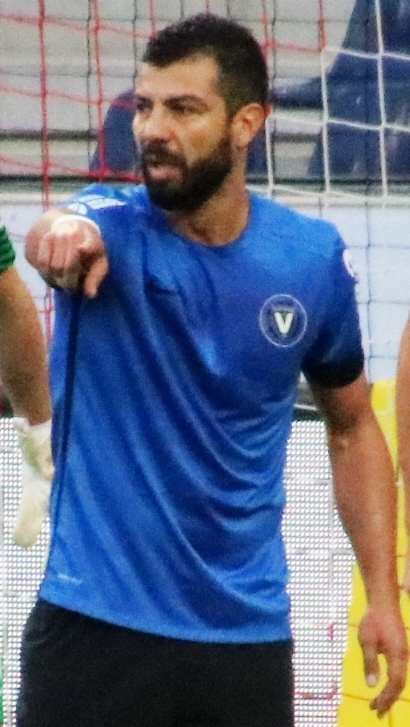
- Constantin playing for Viitorul Constanța in 2017

Personal information
- Full name: Marius Marcel Constantin
- Date of birth: 25 October 1984 (age 42)
- Place of birth: Brașov, Romania
- Height: 1.85 m (6 ft 1 in)
- Position: Centre-back

Youth career
- 1996–1997: Postăvarul Brașov
- 1997–1999: Amco Ghimbav
- 1999–2000: FC Ghimbav
- 2000–2002: FC Brașov

Senior career*
Years	Team	Apps	(Gls)
2002–2004	FC Brașov	32	(1)
2004–2011	Rapid București	159	(3)
2011–2012	Vaslui	15	(1)
2012	Rapid București	3	(0)
2014	FC Brașov	5	(0)
2014–2017	ASA Târgu Mureș	59	(2)
2015	→ Jiangsu Sainty (loan)	7	(0)
2017	Viitorul Constanța	5	(0)
2017–2020	Gaz Metan Mediaș	89	(13)
2020–2022	Universitatea Craiova	56	(0)
2022–2023	Argeș Pitești	23	(0)
2024	Ceahlăul Piatra Neamț	4	(0)
Total		456	(20)

International career
2003	Romania U19	3	(0)
2003–2006	Romania U21	13	(0)
2004–2010	Romania	4	(0)
- * Club domestic league appearances and goals

Marius Marcel Constantin (born 25 October 1984) is a Romanian former professional footballer who played as a centre-back.

== Club career ==
=== Rapid București ===
Constantin was transferred to Rapid București from FC Brașov in 2004.

=== Vaslui ===
On 31 August 2011, Constantin started training with Liga I club, SC Vaslui, and on 8 September he signed a three-year contract with the Moldavian team. Three days later, Constantin made his competitive debut for Vaslui, in a 3–1 home win against Dinamo București.

On 13 July 2012, Constantin signed for four years with Rapid.

In July 2014, ASA Târgu Mureș announced they reached an agreement to sign Constantin for a season.

== International career ==
Constantin played four games for Romania, making his international debut on 27 May 2004, when he came as a substitute and replaced Mirel Rădoi in the 82nd minute of a friendly which ended with a 1–0 loss against Ireland. In 2007 he played in a friendly against Germany which ended with a 3–1 loss and in a Euro 2008 qualification match against Albania which ended with a 6–1 victory. Constantin's last appearance for the national team was on 12 August 2009 in a friendly which ended with a 1–0 victory against Hungary.

On 25 March 2008, he was decorated by the president of Romania, Traian Băsescu for the results on Qualifying to EURO 2008 and qualification to UEFA Euro 2008 Group C with Medalia "Meritul Sportiv" — (The Medal "The Sportive Merit") class III.

== Controversy ==
He has been involved in multiple alcohol related incidents including a driving under influence in 2010, and showing up inebriated at practice while playing for Gaz Metan in 2019. This was probably the reason the team let him go. His former coach Marius Sumudica banned him from Rapid in 2011 after a confrontation regarding his extra professional life while also accusing him of showing up drunk at practice.

== Career statistics ==
=== Club ===
Appearances and goals by club, season and competition
Club	Season	League			National cup (Note: Includes Cupa României, Chinese FA Cup)		Europe		Other		Total	
Club	Season	Division	Apps	Goals	Apps	Goals	Apps	Goals	Apps	Goals	Apps	Goals
Braşov	2002–03	Divizia A	13	1	0	0	—		—		13	1
Braşov	2003–04	Divizia A	19	0	1	0	—		—		20	0
Braşov	Total		32	1	1	0	—		—		33	1
Rapid București	2004–05	Divizia A	19	0	1	0	—		—		20	0
Rapid București	2005–06	Divizia A	26	0	6	1	16 (Note: Appearance(s) in UEFA Cup/UEFA Europa League)	0	—		48	1
Rapid București	2006–07	Liga I	26	0	3	0	7	1	—		36	1
Rapid București	2007–08	Liga I	30	0	3	0	1	0	1 (Note: Appearance in Supercupa României)	0	35	0
Rapid București	2008–09	Liga I	19	0	0	0	2	0	—		21	0
Rapid București	2009–10	Liga I	22	1	1	0	—		—		23	1
Rapid București	2010–11	Liga I	17	2	3	0	—		—		20	2
Rapid București	Total		159	3	17	1	26	1	1	0	203	5
Vaslui	2011–12	Liga I	15	1	2	0	—		—		17	1
Rapid București	2012–13	Liga I	3	0	0	0	1	0	—		4	0
FC Braşov	2013–14	Liga I	5	0	0	0	—		—		5	0
ASA Târgu Mureș	2014–15	Liga I	26	1	2	0	—		—		28	1
ASA Târgu Mureș	2015–16	Liga I	9	0	1	0	0	0	1	0	10	0
ASA Târgu Mureș	2016–17	Liga I	24	1	0	0	—		2 (Note: Appearances in Cupa Ligii)	0	26	1
ASA Târgu Mureș	Total		59	2	3	0	0	0	3	0	65	2
Jiangsu Sainty (loan)	2015	Chinese Super League	7	0	4	0	—		—		11	0
Viitorul Constanța	2017–18	Liga I	5	0	—		4 (Note: Two appearances in UEFA Champions League, two appearances in UEFA Europa League)	0	—		9	0
Gaz Metan Mediaș	2017–18	Liga I	27	3	4	0	—		—		31	3
Gaz Metan Mediaș	2018–19	Liga I	32	2	0	0	—		—		32	2
Gaz Metan Mediaș	2019–20	Liga I	30	8	4	0	—		—		34	8
Gaz Metan Mediaș	Total		89	5	8	0	—		—		97	13
Universitatea Craiova	2020–21	Liga I	35	0	4	0	1	0	—		40	0
Universitatea Craiova	2021–22	Liga I	20	0	2	1	2 (Note: name)	0	2 (Note: One appearance in Supercupa României, one appearance in Liga I play-offs for UEFA Europa Conference League)	0	26	1
Universitatea Craiova	Total		55	0	6	1	3	0	2	0	66	1
Argeș Pitești	2022–23	Liga I	23	0	1	0	—		—		24	0
Ceahlăul Piatra Neamț	2023–24	Liga II	4	0	—		—		—		4	0
Career total			456	20	42	2	34	1	6	0	538	23

=== International ===
Appearances and goals by national team and year
National team	Year	Apps	Goals
Romania	2004	1	0
Romania	2007	2	0
Romania	2009	1	0
Total		4	0

== Honours ==
Rapid București

- Cupa României: 2005–06, 2006–07
- Supercupa României: 2007

ASA Târgu Mureș

- Supercupa României: 2015

Jiangsu Sainty

- Chinese FA Cup: 2015

Universitatea Craiova

- Cupa României: 2020–21
- Supercupa României: 2021

Individual

- Liga I Team of the Season: 2019–20
