= Geoffrey Malfleury =

Martiniquais professional footballer (born 1988)

Personal information
- Full name: Geoffrey Luc Fabien Malfleury
- Date of birth: 20 January 1988 (age 38)
- Place of birth: Aubervilliers, France
- Height: 1.66 m (5 ft 5 in)
- Position: Forward

Senior career*
Years	Team	Apps	(Gls)
2009–2011	Stade Nyonnais	47	(8)
2011–2012	Red Star	36	(18)
2012–2014	Le Havre	56	(9)
2013–2014	→ Le Havre B	5	(0)
2013–2014	→ Istres (loan)	15	(9)
2015–2017	Tours	48	(7)
2016–2017	→ Tours B	6	(4)
2017–2018	União da Madeira	6	(1)
2018	Alki Oroklini	14	(7)
2018	Voluntari	13	(2)
2019	Wigry Suwałki	0	(0)
2019–2020	Cannes	13	(3)
2021–2023	US Cap d'Ail		

International career
2014–2016	Martinique	3	(0)
- * Club domestic league appearances and goals as of 09:51, 12 April 2024 (UTC)

Geoffrey Luc Fabien Malfleury (born 20 January 1988) is a Martiniquais professional footballer who plays as a forward. During his career, he also played in France, Switzerland, Portugal and Cyprus for teams such as Stade Nyonnais, Le Havre, Tours, União da Madeira, Alki Oroklini and FC Voluntari, among others.

== Club career ==
Malfleury was born in Aubervilliers, France.

=== Wigry Suwałki ===
Malfleury joined Polish club Wigry Suwałki on 16 April 2019, as a last-minute transfer. After passing the medicals and signing the contract, he joined the team that was going to face Podbeskidzie Bielsko-Biała. The following day, it was determined he could not be registed to play due to terminating his contract with Voluntari by mutual consent, while the regulations only allowed players to be registered in Poland past the 31 March deadline if they unilaterally cancelled their previous contract due to their previous club's fault. In the end, the Polish Football Association refused to register Malfleury, and his contract with the club was terminated after only a few days.

== International career ==
In January 2008 he was called up for a training camp with the French under-21 futsal team for a 4-day camp.

At international level, Malfleury plays for the Martinique national team.
