= 2017–18 Liga I =

100th season of top-tier football league in Romania

Liga I
- Season: 2017–18
- Champions: CFR Cluj; 4th title
- Relegated: Juventus București; ACS Poli Timișoara
- Champions League: CFR Cluj
- Europa League: FCSB; Universitatea Craiova; Viitorul Constanța
- Matches: 268
- Goals: 622 (2.32 per match)
- Top goalscorer: George Țucudean; Harlem Gnohéré (15 goals)
- Best goalkeeper: Jaime Penedo; Giedrius Arlauskis; Alberto Cobrea (14 clean sheets)
- Biggest home win: FCSB 7–0 ACS Poli Timișoara (22 October 2017)
- Biggest away win: Juventus București 0–5 Concordia Chiajna (24 November 2017)
- Highest scoring: ACS Poli Timișoara 4–3 CFR Cluj (26 August 2017); Viitorul Constanța 5–2 CSM Politehnica Iași (30 September 2017); FCSB 7–0 ACS Poli Timișoara (22 October 2017); Universitatea Craiova 2–5 FCSB (29 October 2017); Astra Giurgiu 4–3 Gaz Metan Mediaș (9 February 2018); Concordia Chiajna 3–4 Dinamo București (12 February 2018)
- Longest winning run: 6 matches CFR Cluj; Dinamo București
- Longest unbeaten run: 14 matches FCSB; CFR Cluj
- Longest winless run: 16 matches ACS Poli Timișoara
- Longest losing run: 6 matches Juventus București
- Highest attendance: 30,000; FCSB 1–1 CFR Cluj (29 April 2018)
- Lowest attendance: 15; Concordia Chiajna 3–1 Voluntari (27 February 2018)
- Total attendance: 950,288
- Average attendance: 3,546
- All statistics correct as of 2 June 2018.

The 2017–18 Liga I (also known as Liga 1 Betano for sponsorship reasons) was the 100th season of the Liga I, the top professional league for Romanian association football clubs. The season began on 14 July 2017 and ended on 2 June 2018, being the third to take place since the play-off/play-out format has been introduced.

Defending champions Viitorul Constanța came fourth. CFR Cluj became the new champions in the last fixture of the play-off, clinching their fourth league title after finishing one point above FCSB. Juventus București and Sepsi OSK entered as the promoted teams from the 2016–17 Liga II, but only the latter managed to avoid relegation.

Since Romania dropped from 15th to 17th in the UEFA association coefficient rankings, only the title winner qualified for the UEFA Champions League.

== Teams ==
The league consists of 14 teams: twelve teams from the 2016–17 Liga I and two new teams from the 2016–17 Liga II.

Teams promoted to the Liga I

The first club to be promoted was Juventus București, following their 3–1 win against Balotești on 30 April 2017. Juventus will play in the Liga I for the first time in their history.

The second club to be promoted was Sepsi OSK, following their 1–1 draw against Mioveni on 3 June 2017. Sepsi will play in the Liga I for the first time in their history.

Teams relegated to the Liga II

The first club to be relegated was Târgu Mureș, which were relegated on 19 May 2017 following a 0–1 defeat against Pandurii Târgu Jiu, ending their 3-year stay in the top flight.

The second and final club to be relegated was Pandurii Târgu Jiu, which were relegated on 4 June 2018 following their 1–2 defeat against Botoșani, ending their 12-year stay in the top flight.

=== Venues ===
FCSB (Note: Since 29 November 2015 to 18 March 2016, Steaua was relocated to Nicolae Dobrin Stadium from Pitești, as a result of Arena Națională not having an ISU licence.)	ACS Poli Timișoara	Universitatea Craiova (Note: Universitatea Craiova was relocated to Municipal Stadium from Drobeta-Turnu Severin for the first 17 rounds of this season because Ion Oblemenco Stadium was under construction.)	CFR Cluj
Arena Națională	Dan Păltinișanu	Ion Oblemenco	Dr. Constantin Rădulescu
Capacity: 55,634	Capacity: 32,972	Capacity: 30,983	Capacity: 23,500
Dinamo București	2017–18 Liga I (Romania) Location of Bucharest teams.		CSM Politehnica Iași
Dinamo	2017–18 Liga I (Romania) Location of Bucharest teams.		Emil Alexandrescu
Capacity: 15,032	2017–18 Liga I (Romania) Location of Bucharest teams.		Capacity: 11,390
Astra Giurgiu	2017–18 Liga I (Romania) Location of Bucharest teams.		Gaz Metan Mediaș
Marin Anastasovici	2017–18 Liga I (Romania) Location of Bucharest teams.		Gaz Metan
Capacity: 8,500	2017–18 Liga I (Romania) Location of Bucharest teams.		Capacity: 7,814
FC Botoșani	2017–18 Liga I (Romania) Location of Bucharest teams.		Sepsi OSK
Municipal	2017–18 Liga I (Romania) Location of Bucharest teams.		Municipal
Capacity: 7,782	2017–18 Liga I (Romania) Location of Bucharest teams.		Capacity: 5,200
Concordia Chiajna	FC Voluntari	Juventus București (Note: Juventus was relocated to Anghel Iordănescu Stadium from Voluntari for the play-out round, after having previously played in the regular season (Round 1-26) on Ilie Oană Stadium from Ploiești. The relocation was necessary because Juventus Stadium from Bucharest does not meet the standards for Liga I.)	Viitorul Constanța (Note: Viitorul was relocated to Viitorul Stadium from Ovidiu, as a result of the opening of the stadium.)
Concordia	Anghel Iordănescu	Anghel Iordănescu	Viitorul
Capacity: 5,123	Capacity: 4,600	Capacity: 4,600	Capacity: 4,554

=== Personnel and kits ===
Note: Flags indicate national team as has been defined under FIFA eligibility rules. Players and Managers may hold more than one non-FIFA nationality.

Team	Manager	Captain	Kit manufacturer	Shirt sponsor
ACS Poli Timișoara	(Romania) Adrian Neaga	(Romania) Gabriel Cânu	Joma	Vox Technology Park, Casa Rusu
Astra Giurgiu	(Romania) Gheorghe Mulțescu	(Romania) Alexandru Stan	Joma	Tinmar
Botoșani	(Romania) Costel Enache	(Romania) Alberto Cobrea	Nike / Erreà	Elsaco
CFR Cluj	(Romania) Dan Petrescu	(Portugal) Mário Camora	Joma	NTT Data
Concordia Chiajna	(Romania) Ionuț Badea	(Romania) Marian Cristescu	Lotto	—
CSM Politehnica Iași	(Romania) Flavius Stoican	(Romania) Andrei Cristea	Joma	Municipiul Iași, Cotnari
Dinamo București	(Romania) Florin Bratu	(Romania) Dan Nistor	Macron	Orange
FCSB	(Romania) Nicolae Dică	(Romania) Florin Tănase	Nike	City Insurance
Gaz Metan Mediaș	(Romania) Cristian Pustai	(Romania) Marius Constantin	Joma	Romgaz
Juventus București	(Romania) Marius Baciu	(Romania) Liviu Băjenaru	Joma	Phoenicia Hotels
Sepsi OSK	(Romania) Eugen Neagoe	(Romania) Attila Hadnagy	Adidas	Diószegi, Gyermelyi
Universitatea Craiova	(Italy) Devis Mangia	(Romania) Alexandru Băluță	Joma	Betano.com
Viitorul Constanța	(Romania) Gheorghe Hagi	(Romania) Ianis Hagi	Nike	Holsten, Pepsi
Voluntari	(Romania) Adrian Mutu	(Romania) Daniel Novac	Puma	Academia de Fotbal Voluntari

=== Managerial changes ===
Team	Outgoing manager	Manner of departure	Date of vacancy	Position in table	Incoming manager	Date of appointment
FCSB	(Romania) Laurențiu Reghecampf	Mutual agreement	31 May 2017	Pre-season	(Romania) Nicolae Dică	1 June 2017
Astra Giurgiu	(Romania) Marius Șumudică	End of contract	31 May 2017	Pre-season	(Romania) Edward Iordănescu	1 June 2017
Universitatea Craiova	(Romania) Gheorghe Mulțescu	End of contract	31 May 2017	Pre-season	(Italy) Devis Mangia	1 June 2017
Botoșani	(Romania) Leontin Grozavu	End of contract	5 June 2017	Pre-season	(Romania) Costel Enache	5 June 2017
CSM Politehnica Iași	(Romania) Eugen Neagoe	End of contract	5 June 2017	Pre-season	(Romania) Flavius Stoican	9 June 2017
CFR Cluj	(Hungary) Vasile Miriuță	Mutual agreement	6 June 2017	Pre-season	(Romania) Dan Petrescu	10 June 2017
Concordia Chiajna	(Romania) Dan Alexa	Mutual agreement	18 July 2017	10th	(Hungary) Vasile Miriuță	19 July 2017
Juventus București	(Romania) Daniel Oprița	Resigned	19 August 2017	14th	(Romania) Marin Barbu (caretaker)	20 August 2017
Dinamo București	(Romania) Cosmin Contra	Signed by Romania	17 September 2017	7th	(Hungary) Vasile Miriuță	21 September 2017
Concordia Chiajna	(Hungary) Vasile Miriuță	Signed by Dinamo București	21 September 2017	12th	(Romania) Ion Moldovan	21 September 2017
Sepsi OSK	(Romania) Valentin Suciu	Mutual agreement	25 October 2017	12th	(Romania) Sándor Nagy (caretaker)	25 October 2017
Sepsi OSK	(Romania) Sándor Nagy (caretaker)	End of caretaker spell	14 November 2017	12th	(Romania) Eugen Neagoe	14 November 2017
Juventus București	(Romania) Marin Barbu (caretaker)	End of caretaker spell	17 December 2017	14th	(Romania) Marius Baciu	18 December 2017
Poli Timișoara	(Romania) Ionuț Popa	Mutual agreement	5 February 2018	9th	(Romania) Leontin Grozavu	6 February 2018
Dinamo București	(Hungary) Vasile Miriuță	Resigned	26 February 2018	8th	(Romania) Florin Bratu	26 February 2018
Astra Giurgiu	(Romania) Edward Iordănescu	Mutual agreement	2 April 2018	5th	(Romania) Gheorghe Mulțescu	4 April 2018
Voluntari	(Romania) Claudiu Niculescu	Mutual agreement	14 April 2018	10th	(Romania) Adrian Mutu	14 April 2018
Poli Timișoara	(Romania) Leontin Grozavu	Mutual agreement	18 April 2018	12th	(Romania) Adrian Neaga	18 April 2018
Concordia Chiajna	(Romania) Ion Moldovan	Mutual agreement	25 April 2018	11th	(Romania) Ionuț Badea	25 April 2018

== Regular season ==
In the regular season the 14 teams will meet twice, a total of 26 matches per team, with the top 6 advancing to the Championship round and the bottom 8 qualifying for Relegation round.

=== Table ===
Pos	Team	Pld	W	D	L	GF	GA	GD	Pts	Qualification
1	CFR Cluj	26	18	5	3	42	13	+29	59	Qualification for the Championship round
2	FCSB	26	16	7	3	52	18	+34	55	Qualification for the Championship round
3	Universitatea Craiova	26	14	9	3	41	26	+15	51	Qualification for the Championship round
4	Astra Giurgiu	26	12	8	6	38	27	+11	44 (Note: Astra is ahead of Viitorul on head-to-head results: Astra–Viitorul 3–1, Viitorul–Astra 1–1.)	Qualification for the Championship round
5	Viitorul Constanța	26	13	5	8	34	21	+13	44	Qualification for the Championship round
6	CSM Politehnica Iași	26	11	6	9	34	31	+3	39 (Note: Iași is ahead of Botoșani and Dinamo on head-to-head points: Iași 7 pts, Botoșani 5 pts, Dinamo 4 pts.)	Qualification for the Championship round
7	Botoșani	26	11	6	9	28	26	+2	39	Qualification for the Relegation round
8	Dinamo București	26	11	6	9	39	31	+8	39	Qualification for the Relegation round
9	Concordia Chiajna	26	8	4	14	36	37	−1	28 (Note: Concordia is ahead of Voluntari on head-to-head results: Voluntari–Concordia 0–1, Concordia–Voluntari 3–1.)	Qualification for the Relegation round
10	Voluntari	26	7	7	12	25	35	−10	28	Qualification for the Relegation round
11	ACS Poli Timișoara	26	6	9	11	22	37	−15	27	Qualification for the Relegation round
12	Sepsi OSK	26	5	4	17	15	44	−29	19	Qualification for the Relegation round
13	Gaz Metan Mediaș	26	2	10	14	14	39	−25	16	Qualification for the Relegation round
14	Juventus București	26	1	8	17	12	47	−35	11	Qualification for the Relegation round

Source: LPF (in Romanian), Soccerway
Rules for classification: 1) Points; 2) Head-to-head points; 3) Head-to-head goal difference; 4) Head-to-head goals scored; 5) Goal difference; 6) Goals scored; 7) Play-off.

=== Results ===
Home \ Away	ACS	AST	BOT	CFR	CON	CSU	IAȘ	DIN	GAZ	JUV	SPS	STE	VII	VOL
ACS Poli Timișoara		2–1	1–1	4–3	0–3	0–2	1–2	0–0	1–1	2–1	0–0	0–1	0–0	2–3
Astra Giurgiu	3–0		2–1	2–3	1–0	2–2	0–0	2–0	4–3	2–0	1–0	2–0	3–1	2–3
Botoșani	1–0	1–3		1–1	2–1	1–0	3–3	0–0	1–0	0–0	5–1	0–3	1–0	1–0
CFR Cluj	1–0	2–0	0–0		2–0	2–1	1–0	1–0	0–0	2–0	2–0	1–1	2–0	2–0
Concordia Chiajna	0–1	1–2	3–0	0–1		1–2	0–1	3–4	1–1	1–1	2–1	1–2	1–2	3–1
Universitatea Craiova	1–1	1–1	1–0	2–1	1–1		2–0	2–2	2–0	3–1	1–0	2–5	3–1	1–1
CSM Politehnica Iași	1–1	1–0	1–0	0–2	3–1	1–2		2–1	0–0	3–1	0–2	1–0	0–1	2–1
Dinamo București	1–2	1–1	0–1	0–2	2–3	2–2	2–1		3–1	3–0	1–0	2–2	0–4	2–0
Gaz Metan Mediaș	0–2	0–0	1–0	0–3	1–2	0–0	0–2	0–3		0–0	2–1	1–2	0–1	1–1
Juventus București	1–1	0–1	0–2	0–2	0–5	0–1	2–2	0–3	1–1		2–1	1–2	0–1	0–0
Sepsi OSK	1–0	0–0	0–2	0–2	1–1	2–3	2–1	0–3	0–0	2–1		0–4	1–0	0–3
FCSB	7–0	1–1	2–0	1–1	2–1	1–1	1–1	1–0	4–0	4–0	2–0		2–0	2–1
Viitorul Constanța	1–1	1–1	2–1	1–0	3–0	0–2	5–2	0–1	3–0	3–0	3–0	1–0		0–0
Voluntari	1–0	3–1	1–3	0–3	0–1	0–1	0–4	1–3	2–1	0–0	3–0	0–0	0–0	

Source: LPF (in Romanian)
Legend: Blue = home team win; Yellow = draw; Red = away team win.
For upcoming matches, an "a" indicates there is an article about the rivalry between the two participants.

=== Positions by round ===
Team ╲ Round	1	2	3	4	5	6	7	8	9	10	11	12	13	14	15	16	17	18	19	20	21	22	23	24	25	26
ACS Poli Timișoara	5	9	10	7	7	9	7	7	6	6	6	6	6	8	10	9	8	9	9	9	9	9	9	10	10	11
Astra Giurgiu	6	10	5	5	4	5	6	6	2	3	3	5	4	4	5	6	6	6	6	6	6	4	4	4	4	4
Botoșani	8	4	1	1	1	2	2	4	5	5	5	4	5	5	4	4	4	4	4	4	4	5	5	8	8	7
CFR Cluj	7	2	2	2	2	1	1	1	1	1	1	1	1	1	1	2	2	1	1	1	1	1	1	1	1	1
Concordia Chiajna	11	11	12	12	13	13	13	13	12	12	12	11	11	9	11	11	11	11	11	10	10	11	11	11	11	9
CSM Politehnica Iași	12	12	8	10	10	8	8	8	10	8	10	9	10	11	9	8	9	8	8	8	8	8	8	7	7	6
Universitatea Craiova	3	3	6	6	6	3	3	2	3	4	4	3	3	3	3	3	3	3	3	3	3	3	3	3	3	3
Dinamo București	1	5	4	4	5	6	5	5	7	7	7	7	7	6	7	7	7	7	7	7	7	7	7	6	6	8
Gaz Metan Mediaș	13	13	14	14	12	12	12	12	13	13	13	13	13	13	13	13	13	13	13	12	13	12	13	13	13	13
Juventus București	14	14	13	13	14	14	14	14	14	14	14	14	14	14	14	14	14	14	14	14	14	14	14	14	14	14
Sepsi OSK	10	8	11	8	8	10	10	9	11	11	11	12	12	12	12	12	12	12	12	13	12	13	12	12	12	12
FCSB	4	1	3	3	3	4	4	3	4	2	2	2	2	2	2	1	1	2	2	2	2	2	2	2	2	2
Viitorul Constanța	2	7	9	11	11	11	11	10	9	10	8	10	8	7	6	5	5	5	5	5	5	6	6	5	5	5
Voluntari	9	6	7	9	9	7	9	11	8	9	9	8	9	10	8	10	10	10	10	11	11	10	10	9	9	10

== Championship play-offs ==
The top six teams from Regular season would meet twice (10 matches per team) for places in 2018–19 UEFA Champions League and 2018–19 UEFA Europa League as well as deciding the league champion. Teams started the Championship round with their points from the Regular season halved, rounded upwards, and no other records carried over from the Regular season.

=== Table ===
Pos	Team	Pld	W	D	L	GF	GA	GD	Pts	Qualification
1	CFR Cluj (C)	10	5	5	0	12	6	+6	50	Qualification for the Champions League second qualifying round
2	FCSB	10	6	3	1	14	6	+8	49	Qualification for the Europa League second qualifying round
3	Universitatea Craiova	10	3	3	4	10	10	0	38	Qualification for the Europa League third qualifying round (Note: Universitatea Craiova qualified for the Europa League third qualifying round by winning the 2017–18 Cupa României.)
4	Viitorul Constanța	10	3	4	3	13	11	+2	35	Qualification for the Europa League first qualifying round
5	Astra Giurgiu	10	3	2	5	9	11	−2	33	
6	CSM Politehnica Iași	10	1	1	8	5	19	−14	24	

Source: Soccerway, Romanian Football Federation
Rules for classification: 1) Points; 2) Points without rounding; 3) Head-to-head points; 4) Head-to-head goal difference; 5) Head-to-head goals scored; 6) Goal difference; 7) Goals scored; 8) Play-off (only if needed to decide champion or teams for UEFA competitions). (Note: only criteria 6 and 7 are applied to establish the classification during the competition.)
(C) Champions

=== Results ===
Home \ Away	AST	CFR	IAS	UCV	FCSB	VFC
Astra Giurgiu		0–2	3–0	1–0	0–3	0–2
CFR Cluj	1–1		2–1	1–0	1–1	1–0
CSM Politehnica Iași	0–3	1–1		1–2	1–0	0–2
CS Universitatea Craiova	1–0	0–0	4–1		0–1	3–3
FCSB	1–0	1–1	1–0	2–0		2–1
Viitorul Constanța	1–1	1–2	1–0	0–0	2–2	

Source: Liga 1
Legend: Blue = home team win; Yellow = draw; Red = away team win.

=== Positions by round ===
Team ╲ Round	1	2	3	4	5	6	7	8	9	10
Astra Giurgiu	5	4	5	5	5	5	4	4	5	5
CFR Cluj	1	1	2	2	2	2	2	1	1	1
CSM Politehnica Iași	6	6	6	6	6	6	6	6	6	6
Universitatea Craiova	3	3	3	3	3	3	3	3	4	3
FCSB	2	2	1	1	1	1	1	2	2	2
Viitorul Constanța	4	5	4	4	4	4	5	5	3	4

== Relegation play-outs ==
The bottom eight teams from regular season will meet twice (14 matches per team) to contest against relegation. Teams start the Relegation round with their points from the Regular season halved, rounded upwards, and no other records carried over from the Regular season. The winner of the Relegation round finishes 7th in the overall season standings, the second placed team - 8th, and so on, with the last placed team in the Relegation round being 14th.

=== Table ===
Pos	Team	Pld	W	D	L	GF	GA	GD	Pts	Qualification or relegation
7	Dinamo București	14	11	1	2	29	10	+19	54	
8	Botoșani	14	5	5	4	12	9	+3	40	
9	Sepsi OSK	14	6	6	2	21	14	+7	34	
10	Gaz Metan Mediaș	14	6	4	4	18	15	+3	30	
11	Concordia Chiajna	14	4	4	6	13	17	−4	30	
12	Voluntari (O)	14	3	4	7	16	22	−6	27	Qualification for the relegation play-offs
13	ACS Poli Timișoara (R)	14	3	4	7	10	16	−6	27	Relegation to Liga II
14	Juventus București (R)	14	3	2	9	9	25	−16	17	Relegation to Liga II

Source: Soccerway
Rules for classification: 1) Points; 2) Points without rounding; 3) Head-to-head points; 4) Head-to-head goal difference; 5) Head-to-head goals scored; 6) Goal difference; 7) Goals scored; 8) Play-off (only if needed to decide teams for relegation). (Note: only criteria 6 and 7 are applied to establish the classification during the competition.)
(O) Play-off winners; (R) Relegated

=== Results ===
Home \ Away	ACS	BOT	CON	DIN	GAZ	JUV	SPS	VOL
ACS Poli Timișoara		0–1	1–0	1–3	0–0	2–0	2–2	2–3
Botoșani	0–0		0–1	0–1	2–0	0–0	2–2	1–0
Concordia Chiajna	0–1	0–0		0–4	0–0	2–1	1–1	0–1
Dinamo București	1–0	2–0	3–1		3–0	1–2	0–0	2–0
Gaz Metan Mediaș	1–1	2–1	2–1	2–3		3–0	1–1	1–0
Juventus București	1–0	0–3	1–3	0–2	0–3		0–2	2–2
Sepsi OSK	3–0	0–1	0–2	2–0	2–1	2–1		2–2
Voluntari	1–0	1–1	2–2	2–4	1–2	0–1	1–2	

Source: Liga 1
Legend: Blue = home team win; Yellow = draw; Red = away team win.

=== Positions by round ===
Team ╲ Round	1	2	3	4	5	6	7	8	9	10	11	12	13	14
ACS Poli Timișoara	11	11	11	11	12	13	13	13	13	13	13	13	13	13
Botoșani	8	8	8	8	8	8	8	8	8	8	8	8	8	8
Concordia Chiajna	10	10	10	12	10	11	12	11	11	10	11	10	11	11
Dinamo București	7	7	7	7	7	7	7	7	7	7	7	7	7	7
Gaz Metan Mediaș	13	13	12	13	13	12	10	12	12	11	10	11	10	10
Juventus București	14	14	13	14	14	14	14	14	14	14	14	14	14	14
Sepsi OSK	12	12	14	10	9	10	9	10	9	9	9	9	9	9
Voluntari	9	9	9	9	11	9	11	9	10	12	12	12	12	12

== Promotion/relegation play-offs ==
The 12th-placed team of the Liga I faced the 3rd-placed team of the Liga II.

Team 1	Agg.	Team 2	1st leg	2nd leg
Voluntari	1–1 (3–0 p)	Chindia Târgoviște	1–0	0–1 (a.e.t.)

9 June 2018	Voluntari	1–0	Chindia Târgoviște	Voluntari
19:00	Balaur 79'			Stadium: Anghel Iordănescu; Attendance: 1,200; Referee: Radu Petrescu (Bucharest)

13 June 2018	Chindia Târgoviște	1–0 (a.e.t.) (0–3 p)	Voluntari	Târgoviște
17:30	Ciobotariu 68'			Stadium: Eugen Popescu; Attendance: 5,000; Referee: István Kovács (Carei)
	Penalties
	Cherchez (penalty missed); Pencea (penalty missed); Neguț (penalty missed)		(penalty scored) Cernat; (penalty scored) Marinescu; (penalty missed) Răuță; (penalty scored) Leasă

Notes:

- Voluntari remained in Liga I and Chindia Târgoviște remained in Liga II.

== Season statistics ==
=== Top scorers ===
Updated to matches played on 2 June 2018.

Rank	Player	Club	Goals
1	(Romania) George Țucudean	Viitorul Constanța (11) / CFR Cluj (4)	15
1	(France) Harlem Gnohéré	FCSB	15
3	(Romania) Paul Batin	Concordia Chiajna	13
4	(Romania) Alexandru Mitriță	Universitatea Craiova	12
5	(Brazil) Gustavo	Universitatea Craiova	11
5	(Romania) Alexandru Ioniță	Astra Giurgiu (10) / CFR Cluj (1)	11
5	(Romania) Alexandru Băluță	Universitatea Craiova	11
5	(Romania) Mihai Roman	Botoșani	11
9	(Romania) Florin Tănase	FCSB	10
9	(Romania) Dennis Man	FCSB	10
9	(Romania) Constantin Budescu	FCSB	10
12	(Romania) Andrei Cristea	CSM Politehnica Iași	9
12	(Romania) István Fülöp	Sepsi OSK	9
12	(Romania) Marian Cristescu	Concordia Chiajna	9
12	(Venezuela) Mario Rondón	Gaz Metan Mediaș	9
12	(Romania) Daniel Popa	Botoșani (1) / Dinamo București (8)	9
12	(Portugal) Diogo Salomão	Dinamo București	9
12	(Romania) Adrian Bălan	Voluntari	9

=== Hat-tricks ===
Player	For	Against	Result	Date
(Romania) Alexandru Tudorie	Voluntari	Sepsi OSK	3–0	10 September 2017
(Romania) George Țucudean^{4}	Viitorul Constanța	CSM Iași	5–2	30 September 2017
(France) Harlem Gnohéré	FCSB	ACS Poli Timișoara	7–0	22 October 2017
(Romania) Alexandru Mitriță	Universitatea Craiova	CSM Politehnica Iași	4–1	14 April 2018
(Cape Verde) Ely	Gaz Metan Mediaș	Juventus București	3–0	22 April 2018

^{4} Player scored four goals

=== Clean sheets ===
Updated to matches played on 2 June 2018.

Rank	Player	Club	Clean sheets
1	(Panama) Jaime Penedo	Dinamo București	14
1	(Lithuania) Giedrius Arlauskis	CFR Cluj	14
1	(Romania) Alberto Cobrea	Botoșani	14
4	(Bulgaria) Plamen Iliev	Astra Giurgiu	12
5	(Romania) Victor Rîmniceanu	Viitorul Constanța (10) / Sepsi OSK (1)	11
6	(Romania) Florin Niță^{1}	FCSB	10
7	(Romania) Cosmin Vâtcă	CFR Cluj	8
8	(Moldova) Nicolae Calancea	Universitatea Craiova	7
8	(Romania) Cristian Bălgrădean	Concordia Chiajna (2) / FCSB (5)	7
10	(Romania) Dragoș Balauru	Voluntari	6
10	(Romania) Virgil Drăghia	Juventus București	6
10	(Romania) Cătălin Straton	ACS Poli Timișoara	6
10	(Romania) Răzvan Pleșca	Gaz Metan Mediaș	6

^{1} Florin Niță was transferred to Sparta Prague during the winter transfer window.

=== Discipline ===
As of 2 June 2018

==== Player ====
- Most yellow cards: 14
  - (Romania) István Fülöp (Sepsi OSK)
- Most red cards: 2
  - (Cameroon) Anatole Abang (Astra Giurgiu)
  - (Romania) Ionuț Cioinac (CSM Politehnica Iași)
  - (Portugal) Diogo Salomão (Dinamo București)
  - (Ivory Coast) Kévin Boli (CFR Cluj)
  - (Albania) Kamer Qaka (CSM Politehnica Iași)
  - (Romania) Mădălin Mihăescu (CSM Politehnica Iași)
  - (Romania) Mihai Pintilii (FCSB)
  - (Romania) Gabriel Cânu (ACS Poli Timișoara)
  - (Romania) Dragoș Balauru (Voluntari)

==== Club ====
- Most yellow cards: 116
  - CSM Politehnica Iași
- Most red cards: 9
  - Astra Giurgiu

== Attendances ==
Pos	Team	Total	High	Low	Average	Change
1	Universitatea Craiova	210,576	29,000	600	11,699	+168.2%^{2}
2	FCSB	178,500	30,000	1,000	9,917	+81.5%
3	CFR Cluj	112,918	18,000	1,000	6,273	+61.1%
4	Politehnica Iași	68,904	13,000	700	3,828	+114.3%
5	FC Botoșani	60,150	5,000	650	3,008	−19.3%
6	Dinamo București	57,467	24,726	200	2,873	−35.0%
7	Sepsi OSK	55,700	6,000	400	2,785	+50.8%^{1}
8	Viitorul Constanța	45,300	5,000	800	2,517	+76.4%
9	ACS Poli Timișoara	41,450	20,000	50	2,073	+2.9%
10	Astra Giurgiu	32,500	4,500	300	1,806	+13.7%
11	Gaz Metan Mediaș	26,550	3,000	200	1,327	−34.8%
12	Voluntari	26,237	4,000	231	1,312	+12.9%
13	Concordia Chiajna	21,065	4,000	15	1,053	+15.1%
14	Juventus București	12,971	7,000	27	649	+17.4%^{1}
	League total	950,288	30,000	15	3,546	+31.1%

Updated to games played on 2 June 2018
Source: League matches: Liga I 2017/2018
Notes:
1: Played last season in Liga II.
2: Universitatea Craiova played 8 matches in Turnu Severin while their new stadium was being built.
3: FC Voluntari played 6 matches out of their stadium until it was opened.

== Champion squad ==
CFR Cluj

Goalkeepers: Giedrius Arlauskis (Lithuania) (26 / 0); Cosmin Vâtcă (10 / 0).
Defenders: Kévin Boli (Ivory Coast) (14 / 0); Mário Camora (Portugal) (30 / 1); Srdjan Luchin (3 / 0); Cristian Manea (35 / 0); Andrei Mureșan (27 / 1); Paulo Vinícius (Brazil) (34 / 5); Andrei Peteleu (7 / 0); Alexandru Vlad (3 / 0).
Midfielders: Mihai Bordeianu (6 / 0); Valentin Costache (13 / 0); Emmanuel Culio (Argentina) (33 / 8); Ciprian Deac (34 / 5); Damjan Đoković (Croatia) (23 / 3); Ovidiu Hoban (34 / 3); Alexandru Ioniță (9 / 1); Sebastian Mailat (13 / 1); Thierry Moutinho (Portugal) (8 / 0); Dan Nistor (17 / 0); Bryan Nouvier (France) (15 / 1); Adrian Păun (19 / 2); Laurențiu Rus (10 / 0).
Forwards: Ibrahima Baldé (Senegal) (13 / 4); Jeremy Bokila (Democratic Republic of the Congo) (5 / 0); Marius Coman (4 / 0); Billel Omrani (Algeria) (30 / 8); George Țucudean (14 / 4); Urko Vera (Spain) (15 / 5).
(league appearances and goals listed in brackets)

Manager: Dan Petrescu.

== Awards ==
=== Best Team of the Championship play-offs ===

Best Team of the 2017–18 Championship play-offs – Liga Profesionistă de Fotbal

Player	Team	Position
(Lithuania) Giedrius Arlauskis	CFR Cluj	Goalkeeper
(Romania) Cristian Manea	CFR Cluj	Defender
(Brazil) Paulo Vinícius	CFR Cluj	Defender
(Serbia) Bogdan Planić	FCSB	Defender
(Serbia) Marko Momčilović	FCSB	Defender
(Romania) Alexandru Mitriță	Universitatea Craiova	Midfielder
(Argentina) Emmanuel Culio	CFR Cluj	Midfielder
(Romania) Constantin Budescu	FCSB	Midfielder
(Romania) Ianis Hagi	Viitorul	Forward
(Romania) George Țucudean	CFR Cluj	Forward
(France) Harlem Gnohéré	FCSB	Forward

== Monthly awards ==
Month	DigiSport Player of the Month		Reference
Month	Player	Club	Reference
July	Alexandru Băluță	Universitatea Craiova	
August	Sergiu Hanca	Dinamo București	
September	Alexandru Tudorie	Voluntari	
October	Harlem Gnohéré	FCSB	
November	Alexandru Ioniță	Astra Giurgiu	
December	Florin Tănase	FCSB	
February	Not awarded		
March	Not awarded		
April	Not awarded		
May	Not awarded		
