= David Caiado =

Portuguese footballer

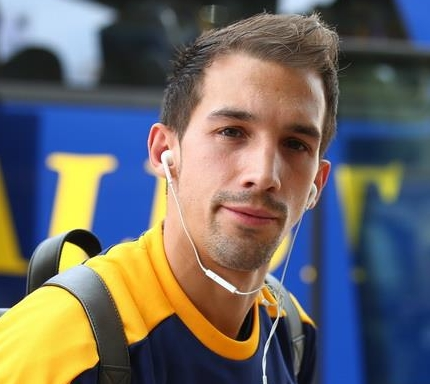
- Caiado as a Metalist Kharkiv player

Personal information
- Full name: David Caiado Dias
- Date of birth: 2 May 1987 (age 39)
- Place of birth: Luxembourg City, Luxembourg
- Height: 1.76 m (5 ft 9 in)
- Position: Winger

Youth career
- 1999–2000: Académica
- 2000–2006: Sporting CP

Senior career*
Years	Team	Apps	(Gls)
2006–2008	Sporting CP	1	(0)
2006–2008	→ Estoril (loan)	19	(1)
2008–2010	Trofense	25	(2)
2009	→ Zagłębie Lubin (loan)	9	(1)
2010–2011	Olympiakos Nicosia	37	(3)
2012–2013	Beroe	59	(17)
2014	Tavriya Simferopol	10	(0)
2014–2015	Vitória Guimarães	6	(0)
2014	Vitória Guimarães B	3	(1)
2015	Metalist Kharkiv	11	(2)
2015–2017	Ponferradina	66	(4)
2018–2019	Gaz Metan Mediaș	40	(5)
2019–2021	Hermannstadt	31	(0)
2020	→ FCSB (loan)	0	(0)
2021–2022	Penafiel	36	(0)
2022–2023	Académica	22	(1)
Total		375	(37)

International career
2003	Portugal U16	3	(0)
2006	Portugal U19	2	(0)
2006–2007	Portugal U20	2	(0)
- * Club domestic league appearances and goals

David Caiado Dias (born 2 May 1987), known as Caiado, is a Portuguese former professional footballer who played as a winger.

After starting out at Sporting CP, he went to compete professionally in seven countries, including his own.

== Club career ==
Born in Luxembourg City, Luxembourg, Caiado joined Sporting CP's youth system at the age of 13 but made only one appearance, coming on as a late substitute for Rodrigo Tello in a 3–2 away loss against S.C. Braga on 7 January 2006. He subsequently spent two seasons on loan to G.D. Estoril Praia in the Segunda Liga, being scarcely played during this stint mainly due to a serious injury.

In June 2008, Caiado joined C.D. Trofense, which had just been promoted to the Primeira Liga. He appeared in roughly half of the league games in his first year, but the club was immediately relegated.

Caiado was loaned to Ekstraklasa side Zagłębie Lubin on 29 June 2009. He returned to Trofa in the following transfer window.

In summer 2010, Caiado joined Olympiakos Nicosia in the Cypriot First Division. He moved clubs and countries again on 29 December 2011, signing a two-and-a-half-year contract with PFC Beroe Stara Zagora in Bulgaria. He made his First Professional Football League debut in a 3–0 defeat at PFC Ludogorets Razgrad on 3 March 2012. He scored his first competitive goal for his new team two weeks later against PSFC Chernomorets Burgas, ending his first season with 13 games and six goals.

On 23 January 2014, Caiado moved to SC Tavriya Simferopol, which at the time ranked second-last in the Ukrainian Premier League. After the Crimean club was disbanded following the peninsula's annexation by Russia, he returned to Portugal's top flight and became Vitória SC's first signing of the summer. The following 28 February, he returned to Ukraine by joining FC Metalist Kharkiv, whom he helped to sixth place during his brief stay at the club.

Caiado moved to the fifth foreign country of his career on 3 September 2015, joining SD Ponferradina of Spain's Segunda División. He scored four goals in his first season, which ended in relegation.

In January 2018, Caiado joined several compatriots at Romanian club CS Gaz Metan Mediaș. On 11 June 2019, he agreed to a deal at fellow Liga I team FC Hermannstadt. In September 2020, both he and teammate Goran Karanović were loaned to FCSB for a single match (against FC Slovan Liberec in the third qualifying round of the UEFA Europa League) as the squad was severely undermanned due to the COVID-19 pandemic.

Caiado returned to Portugal and its second tier on 20 January 2021, agreeing to a one-and-a-half-year deal at F.C. Penafiel.

== Career statistics ==
As of 22 September 2013

Club	Season	League		Cup		Europe		Total	
Club	Season	Apps	Goals	Apps	Goals	Apps	Goals	Apps	Goals
Sporting CP	2005–06	1	0	0	0	0	0	1	0
Estoril	2006–07	17	2	0	0	—		17	2
Estoril	2007–08	3	0	2	0	—		5	0
Estoril	Total	20	2	2	0	—		22	2
Trofense	2008–09	17	0	0	0	—		17	0
Zagłębie Lubin	2009–10	9	1	0	0	—		9	1
Trofense	2009–10	8	2	2	0	—		10	2
Olympiakos Nicosia	2010–11	28	2	0	0	—		17	2
Olympiakos Nicosia	2011–12	9	1	0	0	—		9	1
Olympiakos Nicosia	Total	37	3	0	0	—		37	3
Beroe	2011–12	13	6	0	0	—		13	6
Beroe	2012–13	23	4	6	2	—		29	6
Beroe	2013–14	23	7	1	1	2	1	26	9
Beroe	Total	59	17	7	3	2	1	68	21
Tavriya	2013–14	10	0	0	0	—		10	0
Vitória Guimarães	2014–15	6	0	1	1	—		7	1
Vitória Guimarães B	2014–15	3	1	0	0	—		3	1
Metalist Kharkiv	2014–15	11	2	1	0	—		12	2

== Honours ==
Beroe

- Bulgarian Cup: 2012–13
- Bulgarian Supercup: 2013
