= Robert Hodorogea =

Romanian footballer

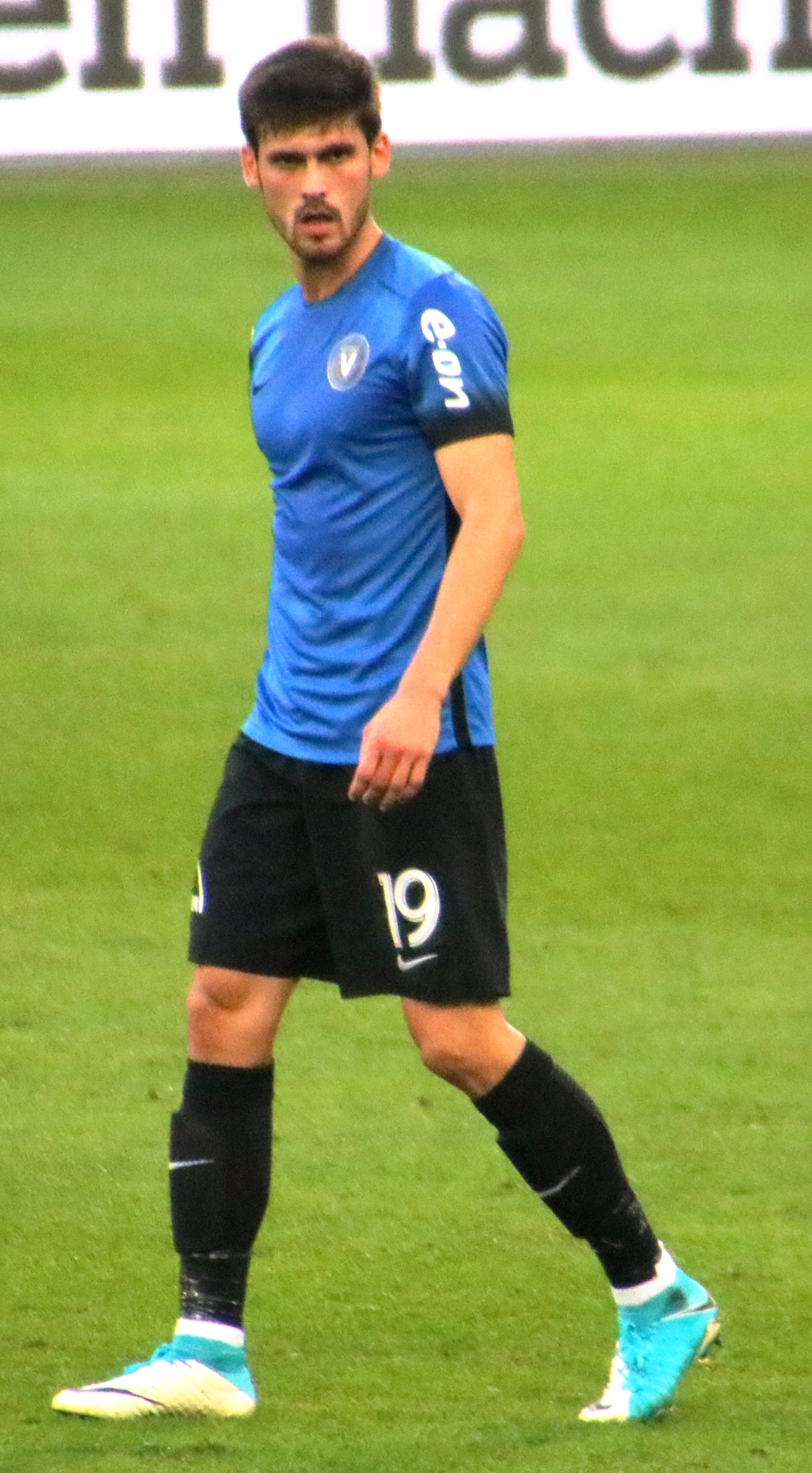
- Hodorogea playing for Viitorul Constanța in 2017

Personal information
- Full name: Robert George Hodorogea
- Date of birth: 24 March 1995 (age 31)
- Place of birth: Galaţi, România
- Height: 1.80 m (5 ft 11 in)
- Position: Defender

Team information
- Current team: Romania (fitness coach)

Youth career
- –2009: Steaua Dunării Galați
- 2009–2012: Gheorghe Hagi Academy
- 2013–2014: → Steaua București (loan)

Senior career*
Years	Team	Apps	(Gls)
2014–2021	Viitorul Constanța	83	(2)
2018–2019	→ Voluntari (loan)	16	(1)
2020–2021	Viitorul II Constanța	4	(0)
Total		103	(3)

International career
2011	Romania U17	2	(0)
2013	Romania U19	3	(0)
2015–2016	Romania U21	11	(1)

Managerial career
- 2022–2023: Kinder Constanța U19 (fitness coach)
- 2023–2026: Farul Constanța (fitness coach)
- 2026–: Romania (fitness coach)
- * Club domestic league appearances and goals

Robert George Hodorogea (born 24 March 1995) is a Romanian former professional footballer who played as a defender, currently fitness coach at the Romania national team.

== Honours ==
Viitorul Constanța

- Liga I: 2016–17
- Supercupa României runner-up: 2017
