= Sorin Bușu =

Romanian footballer

Personal information
- Full name: Sorin Marian Bușu
- Date of birth: 8 July 1989 (age 37)
- Place of birth: Craiova, Romania
- Height: 1.76 m (5 ft 9 in)
- Position: Left-back

Youth career
- –2006: Universitatea Craiova

Senior career*
Years	Team	Apps	(Gls)
2007–2011	FC Universitatea Craiova	15	(0)
2008	→ FC Caracal (loan)	13	(2)
2009	→ Jiul Petroşani (loan)	11	(1)
2010	→ Turnu Severin (loan)	15	(2)
2011	Petrolul Ploiești	0	(0)
2012–2013	Chindia Târgoviște	35	(0)
2013–2014	FC Universitatea Craiova	15	(0)
2014–2015	Caransebeș	24	(1)
2016	FCM Baia Mare	8	(0)
2016–2017	Râmnicu Vâlcea	7	(0)
2017	→ Pandurii Târgu Jiu (loan)	18	(0)
2017–2019	Gaz Metan Mediaș	47	(0)
2019–2020	Hermannstadt	27	(0)
2020–2021	Politehnica Iași	34	(0)
2021–2022	FC U Craiova	15	(0)
2022	Concordia Chiajna	2	(0)
- * Club domestic league appearances and goals as of 01:32, 21 August 2022 (UTC)

Sorin Marian Bușu (born 8 July 1989) is a Romanian professional footballer who plays as a left back .
