= Ricardinho (footballer, born 1994) =

Portuguese footballer

Personal information
- Full name: Ricardo José Veiga Varzim Miranda
- Date of birth: 24 March 1994 (age 32)
- Place of birth: Barcelos, Portugal
- Height: 1.79 m (5 ft 10 in)
- Position: Right-back

Team information
- Current team: Lusitânia
- Number: 24

Youth career
- 2003–2013: Gil Vicente

Senior career*
Years	Team	Apps	(Gls)
2013–2018	Gil Vicente	99	(2)
2013–2014	→ Vilaverdense (loan)	27	(1)
2018–2024	Voluntari	171	(12)
2024–2026	Petrolul Ploiești	72	(3)
2026–	Lusitânia	11	(0)
- * Club domestic league appearances and goals as of 15 November 2026

Ricardo José Veiga Varzim Miranda (born 24 March 1994), commonly known as Ricardinho, is a Portuguese professional footballer who plays as a right-back for Liga Portugal 2 club Lusitânia.

== Career ==
Born in Barcelos, Ricardinho joined local Gil Vicente FC's youth academy at the age of 9. He made his senior debut in 2013 with Vilaverdense FC, competing in the third division.

After returning from his loan spell, Ricardinho played his first competitive game for Gil on 29 October 2014, featuring the full 90 minutes in a 1–1 home draw against Atlético Clube de Portugal for the season's Taça da Liga. He first appeared in the Primeira Liga on 11 January of the following year, starting and being replaced early into the second half of an eventual 2–1 home win over F.C. Penafiel.

== Honours ==
Voluntari

- Cupa României runner-up: 2021–22

Individual

- Liga I Team of the Season: 2021–22
