= Roberto Romeo =

Italian footballer

Personal information
- Date of birth: 27 April 1990 (age 36)
- Place of birth: Soverato, Italy
- Height: 1.72 m (5 ft 8 in)
- Positions: Full back; winger

Youth career
- –2009: Reggina

Senior career*
Years	Team	Apps	(Gls)
2009–2011	Reggina	0	(0)
2009–2010	→ Cassino (loan)	18	(1)
2010–2011	→ Poggibonsi (loan)	13	(0)
2011–2013	Catanzaro	17	(0)
2013–2022	Gaz Metan Mediaș	143	(6)
2022–2023	Universitatea Cluj	19	(1)
2023	FK Csíkszereda	6	(0)
2023–2025	Chindia Târgoviște	31	(0)
Total		247	(8)
- * Club domestic league appearances and goals as of 10 May 2025

Roberto Romeo (born 27 April 1990) is an Italian professional footballer who plays as a full back or a winger.

== Honours ==
Gaz Metan Mediaș

- Liga II: 2015–16
