= Abdelhak Belahmeur =

French footballer (born 1991)

Personal information
- Date of birth: 26 July 1991 (age 35)
- Place of birth: Strasbourg, France
- Height: 1.75 m (5 ft 9 in)
- Position: Midfielder

Team information
- Current team: SR Colmar
- Number: 10

Youth career
- 2001–2006: Strasbourg
- 2006–2007: ASPV Strasbourg
- 2008–2009: FC Geispolsheim
- 2009–2010: Mars Bischheim

Senior career*
| Years | Team | Apps | (Gls) |
| 2011–2013 | Schiltigheim | 19 | (5) |
| 2013–2016 | Strasbourg | 70 | (4) |
| 2015–2016 | → Strasbourg B | 11 | (4) |
| 2016–2017 | Créteil | 12 | (0) |
| 2016–2017 | → Créteil B | 1 | (0) |
| 2017–2018 | Avranches | 27 | (2) |
| 2018–2019 | Voluntari | 16 | (1) |
| 2020– | SR Colmar | 25 | (4) |
- * Club domestic league appearances and goals as of 21:05, 14 November 2022 (UTC)

Abdelhak Belahmeur (born 26 July 1991) is a French professional footballer who plays as a midfielder for SR Colmar.

== Personal life ==
Belhameur holds both French and Algerian nationalities.
