= Boubacar Fofana (footballer, born 1989) =

Guinean footballer

Personal information
- Date of birth: 6 November 1989 (age 37)
- Place of birth: Conakry, Guinea
- Height: 1.93 m (6 ft 4 in)
- Position: Defensive midfielder

Senior career*
Years	Team	Apps	(Gls)
2008	Pinhalnovense	1	(0)
2009–2010	Praiense	36	(4)
2010–2012	Gondomar	27	(3)
2011–2012	→ Kartalspor (loan)	3	(0)
2012	→ Karlsruher SC (loan)	0	(0)
2012–2014	Tondela	52	(4)
2014–2016	Nacional	36	(1)
2016–2017	Al-Ettifaq	11	(0)
2017	→ Al-Khaleej (loan)	8	(0)
2018	Moreirense	11	(0)
2018–2020	Gaz Metan Mediaș	55	(2)
2020–2022	Sepsi OSK	48	(4)
2022	Ironi Tiberias	2	(0)
2023	B-SAD	7	(0)

International career
2014–2019	Guinea	18	(0)
- * Club domestic league appearances and goals as of 19:01, 18 August 2023 (UTC)

Boubacar Fofana (born 6 November 1989) is a Guinean professional footballer who plays as a defensive midfielder.

== Career statistics ==
=== Club ===
As of match played 16 May 2022

Appearances and goals by club, season and competition
Club	Season	League			National cup (Note: Includes Turkish Cup, Taça de Portugal, King Cup, Cupa României)		League cup (Note: Includes Taça da Liga)		Continental (Note: Includes UEFA Europa League)		Other		Total	
Club	Season	Division	Apps	Goals	Apps	Goals	Apps	Goals	Apps	Goals	Apps	Goals	Apps	Goals
Pinhalnovense	2008–09	Segunda Divisão	1	0	0	0	—		—		—		1	0
Praiense	2008–09	Segunda Divisão	13	3	0	0	—		—		—		13	3
Praiense	2009–10	Segunda Divisão	23	1	1	0	—		—		—		24	1
Praiense	Total		36	4	1	0	0	0	0	0	0	0	37	4
Gondomar	2010–11	Segunda Divisão	27	3	3	0	—		—		—		30	3
Kartalspor (loan)	2011–12	TFF First League	3	0	1	0	—		—		—		4	0
Tondela	2012–13	Segunda Liga	16	2	0	0	0	0	—		—		16	2
Tondela	2013–14	Segunda Liga	36	2	1	0	2	0	—		—		39	2
Tondela	Total		52	4	1	0	2	0	0	0	0	0	55	4
Nacional	2014–15	Primeira Liga	21	0	2	0	1	0	1	0	—		25	0
Nacional	2015–16	Primeira Liga	15	1	3	0	2	0	—		—		20	1
Nacional	Total		36	1	5	0	3	0	1	0	0	0	45	1
Al-Ettifaq	2016–17	Saudi Professional League	11	1	0	0	—		—		—		11	1
Al-Khaleej (loan)	2016–17	Saudi Professional League	8	0	1	0	—		—		—		9	0
Moreirense	2017–18	Primeira Liga	11	0	1	0	0	0	—		—		12	0
Gaz Metan Mediaș	2018–19	Liga I	31	2	2	0	—		—		—		33	2
Gaz Metan Mediaș	2019–20	Liga I	24	0	0	0	—		—		—		24	0
Gaz Metan Mediaș	Total		55	2	2	0	0	0	0	0	0	0	57	2
Sepsi OSK	2020–21	Liga I	28	2	0	0	—		—		—		28	2
Sepsi OSK	2021–22	Liga I	20	2	1	0	—		2	1	—		23	3
Sepsi OSK	Total		48	4	1	0	0	0	2	1	0	0	51	5
Ironi Tiberias	2022–23	Liga Leumit	0	0	0	0	—		—		—		0	0
Career total			288	19	16	0	5	0	3	1	0	0	311	20

=== International ===
Appearances and goals by national team and year
National team	Year	Apps	Goals
Guinea	2014	8	0
Guinea	2015	7	0
Guinea	2016	0	0
Guinea	2017	0	0
Guinea	2018	1	0
Guinea	2019	2	0
Total		18	0

== Honours ==
Sepsi OSK

- Cupa României: 2021–22
