= Răzvan Pleșca =

Romanian footballer

Personal information
- Full name: Răzvan Neculaie Pleșca
- Date of birth: 25 November 1982 (age 43)
- Place of birth: Arad, Romania
- Height: 1.88 m (6 ft 2 in)
- Position: Goalkeeper

Youth career
- –2000: Telecom Arad
- 2000–2002: Național București

Senior career*
Years	Team	Apps	(Gls)
2003–2005	Național București	1	(0)
2005–2010	Politehnica Iași	30	(0)
2010–2021	Gaz Metan Mediaș	256	(0)
2015–2016	→ Botoșani (loan)	17	(0)
Total		304	(0)
- * Club domestic league appearances and goals

Răzvan Nicolae Pleșca (born 25 November 1982) is a Romanian former professional footballer who played as a goalkeeper. In his career Pleșca played mostly for Gaz Metan Mediaș, but also for teams such as Național București, Politehnica Iași or FC Botoșani.
