= 2025–26 CS Universitatea Craiova season =

Universitatea Craiova
2025–26 season
- President: Mihai Rotaru
- Manager: Mirel Rădoi (until 10 November); Filipe Coelho (from 11 November)
- Stadium: Ion Oblemenco Stadium
- Superliga: Regular season: 1st
- Superliga: Championship round: 1st
- Cupa României: Winners
- UEFA Conference League: League phase
- Top goalscorer: League: Assad Al Hamlawi (11); All: Assad Al Hamlawi (16)
- Average home league attendance: 16,094
- Biggest win: Universitatea Craiova 5–0 Universitatea Cluj
- Biggest defeat: Sarajevo 2–1 Universitatea Craiova; Spartak Trnava 4–3 Universitatea Craiova
Home colours	Away colours	Third colours

The 2025–26 season was the 78th in the history of Clubul Sportiv Universitatea Craiova and their 12th consecutive season in the Romanian top flight, Liga I. The club also participated in the Cupa României and the UEFA Conference League. The team advanced to the group stage of the continental competition for the first time, having overcome three opponents.

== Squad ==
As of 25 May 2026

No.	Name	Nationality	Position	Date of birth (age)	Signed from	Signed in	Contract end (Note: Contract ends on 30 June.)
Goalkeepers
1	Silviu Lung Jr.	(Romania)	GK	4 June 1989 (37)	(Turkey) Kayserispor	1 July 2022	2026
21	Laurențiu Popescu	(Romania)	GK	18 January 1997 (29)	FC Brașov	1 July 2018	2027
31	Matei Goga	(Romania)	GK	26 October 2006 (20)	Academy	1 July 2025	Unknown
32	João Gonçalves	(Portugal)	GK	5 November 2000 (25)	Free agent	21 April 2026	2026
33	Alexandru Glodean	(Romania)	GK	21 April 2008 (18)	Academy	1 July 2025	Unknown
77	Pavlo Isenko	(Ukraine)	GK	21 July 2003 (23)	(Ukraine) Vorskla Poltava	14 July 2025	2029
Defenders
2	Florin Ștefan	(Romania)	LB	9 May 1996 (30)	Sepsi OSK	2 August 2025	Unknown
3	Oleksandr Romanchuk	(Ukraine)	CB	16 December 1999 (26)	(Ukraine) Kryvbas Kryvyi Rih	7 July 2025	2029
6	Vladimir Screciu	(Romania)	CB	13 January 2000 (26)	(Belgium) Genk	1 July 2020	2028
11	Nicușor Bancu (C)	(Romania)	LB	18 September 1992 (34)	Olt Slatina	1 July 2014	2028
15	Juraj Badelj	(Croatia)	CB	24 August 2003 (23)	(Croatia) NK Rudeš	1 July 2024	Unknown
19	Vasile Mogoș	(Romania)	RB	31 October 1992 (33)	CFR Cluj	1 July 2024	2026
23	Samuel Teles	(Portugal)	RB	28 February 1997 (29)	Oțelul Galați	1 July 2025	Unknown
24	Nikola Stevanović	(Serbia)	CB	13 September 1998 (28)	Oțelul Galați	3 July 2025	2027
25	Darius Fălcușan	(Romania)	CB	13 March 2006 (20)	(Italy) Empoli U20	8 July 2025	2029
28	Adrian Rus	(Romania)	CB	18 March 1996 (30)	Free agent	2 September 2025	Unknown
Midfielders
4	Alexandru Crețu	(Romania)	DM	24 April 1992 (34)	(Saudi Arabia) Al-Wehda	1 July 2025	Unknown
5	Anzor Mekvabishvili	(Georgia (country))	DM	5 June 2001 (25)	(Georgia (country)) Dinamo Tbilisi	18 January 2024	2028
8	Tudor Băluță	(Romania)	DM	27 March 1999 (27)	(Poland) Śląsk Wrocław	1 July 2025	Unknown
14	Lyes Houri	(France)	AM	19 January 1996 (30)	Viitorul Constanța	1 July 2021	2026
17	Carlos Mora	(Costa Rica)	RW	18 March 2001 (25)	(Costa Rica) Alajuelense	1 July 2024	Unknown
20	Alexandru Cicâldău	(Romania)	CM	8 July 1997 (29)	(Turkey) Galatasaray	9 September 2024	2028
29	Luca Băsceanu	(Romania)	AM	17 May 2006 (20)	Farul Constanța	1 July 2025	Unknown
30	David Matei	(Romania)	CM	19 July 2006 (20)	Steaua București	1 July 2025	Unknown
38	Denys Muntean	(Romania)	AM	6 January 2009 (17)	Academy	1 July 2025	Unknown
–	Alexandru Iamandache	(Romania)	CM	12 December 1999 (26)	CS Afumați	10 February 2026	Unknown
Forwards
7	Steven Nsimba	(France)	ST	12 February 1996 (30)	(France) Aubagne	26 July 2025	Unknown
9	Assad Al-Hamlawi	(Palestine)	ST	27 October 2000 (26)	(Poland) Śląsk Wrocław	8 July 2025	Unknown
10	Ștefan Baiaram	(Romania)	LW	31 December 2002 (23)	Academy	1 July 2019	2028
12	Monday Etim	(Nigeria)	RW	4 December 1998 (27)	(Denmark) Hillerød	2 September 2025	Unknown
18	Mihnea Rădulescu	(Romania)	RW	17 September 2005 (21)	Petrolul Ploiești	1 July 2025	2030

== Transfers ==
=== In ===
Pos.	Player	Transferred from	Fee	Date	Source
DF	(Romania) Denis Benga	(Romania) Gloria Bistrița	Loan return	30 June 2025	
GK	(Romania) David Lazar	(Romania) Gloria Buzău	Loan return	30 June 2025	
MF	(Romania) Alexandru Ișfan	(Romania) Gloria Buzău	Loan return	30 June 2025	
FW	(Spain) Jalen Blesa	(Georgia (country)) Dinamo Batumi	Loan return	30 June 2025	
FW	(Romania) Jovan Marković	(Romania) Hermannstadt	Loan return	30 June 2025	
FW	(Romania) Andrei Ivan	(Turkey) Adanaspor	Loan return	30 June 2025	
MF	(Romania) David Matei	(Romania) Steaua București	€100,000	1 July 2025	
MF	(Romania) Alexandru Crețu	(Saudi Arabia) Al Wehda	Free	1 July 2025	
MF	(Romania) Mihnea Rădulescu	(Romania) Petrolul Ploiești	€400,000	1 July 2025	
MF	(Romania) Tudor Băluță	(Poland) Śląsk Wrocław	Free	1 July 2025	
MF	(Portugal) Samuel Teles	(Romania) Oțelul Galați	Free	1 July 2025	
DF	(Serbia) Nikola Stevanović	(Romania) Oțelul Galați	Undisclosed	3 July 2025	
DF	(Ukraine) Oleksandr Romanchuk	(Ukraine) Kryvbas Kryvyi Rih	Undisclosed	7 July 2025	
DF	(Romania) Darius Fălcușan	(Italy) Empoli U20	€300,000	8 July 2025	
FW	(Palestine) Assad Al Hamlawi	(Poland) Śląsk Wrocław	€700,000	8 July 2025	
GK	(Ukraine) Pavlo Isenko	(Ukraine) Vorskla Poltava	Free	14 July 2025	
FW	(France) Steven Nsimba	(France) Aubagne	Free	26 July 2025	
DF	(Romania) Florin Ștefan	(Romania) Sepsi OSK	Undisclosed	2 August 2025	
DF	(Romania) Adrian Rus	Unattached	Free	2 September 2025	
FW	(Nigeria) Monday Etim	(Denmark) Hillerød	€200,000	2 September 2025	
MF	(Romania) Alexandru Iamandache	(Romania) CS Afumați	Free	10 February 2026	
GK	(Portugal) João Gonçalves	Unattached		21 April 2026	

=== Out ===
Pos.	Player	Transferred to	Fee	Date	Source
FW	(Brazil) Alisson Safira	(Portugal) Santa Clara	Loan return	4 June 2025	
MF	(Romania) Mihai Căpățînă	(Kazakhstan) Ordabasy	Released	30 June 2025	
FW	(Bosnia and Herzegovina) Jovo Lukić	(Romania) Universitatea Cluj	Released	1 July 2025	
GK	(Romania) David Lazar	(Romania) Argeș Pitești	Free	1 July 2025	
MF	(Romania) Ștefan Bană	(Romania) Oțelul Galați	Loan	1 July 2025	
MF	(Japan) Takuto Oshima	(Armenia) FC Noah	€500,000	1 July 2025	
DF	(North Macedonia) Gjoko Zajkov	(United Arab Emirates) Ajman	Free	1 July 2025	
MF	(Romania) Alexandru Mitriță	(China) Zhejiang	€2,000,000	1 July 2025	
FW	(Romania) Alexandru Ișfan	(Romania) Farul Constanta	Free	9 July 2025	
DF	(Honduras) Denil Maldonado	(Russia) Rubin Kazan	€1,600,000	10 July 2025	
GK	(Romania) Relu Stoian	(Romania) Metalul Buzău	Released	13 July 2025	
FW	(Romania) Andrei Ivan	(Greece) Panserraikos	Contract terminated	21 July 2025	
DF	(Spain) Iago López	(Spain) Lugo	Contract terminated	28 July 2025	
FW	(Spain) Jalen Blesa	(Italy) Cesena	Undisclosed	2 August 2025	
DF	(Romania) Florin Gașpar	(Romania) CSM Reșița	Loan	8 August 2025	
DF	(Equatorial Guinea) Basilio Ndong	(Albania) Tirana	Contract terminated	12 August 2025	
FW	(Romania) Jovan Marković	(Romania) Farul Constanța	Free	14 August 2025	
MF	(Cuba) Luis Paradela	(Costa Rica) Saprissa	Loan return	31 December 2025	
MF	(France) Lyes Houri		Contract terminated	18 April 2026	

== Friendlies ==
On 15 June, the team returned to training at the Ilie Balaci Complex, with players absent due to national team schedules. On 22 June, the team traveled to the Bad Radkersburg Resort in Austria to continue preparations.

28 June 2025	Bohemians 1905 (Czech Republic)	3–3	(Romania) Universitatea Craiova	Austria
18:00	Matoušek 22'; Drchal 86'; Čermák 87'	Report	Houri 4'; Ivan 35'; Marković 39'

4 July 2025	MTK Budapest (Hungary)	0–1	(Romania) Universitatea Craiova	Austria
11:00		Report	Baiaram 54'

7 January 2026	Universitatea Craiova (Romania)	1–0	(Turkey) Konyaspor	Turkey
17:00 UTC+3	Mekvabishvili 52'

10 January 2026	Universitatea Craiova (Romania)	2–3	(Germany) VfB Stuttgart II	Turkey
16:00 UTC+3	Houri 69'; Nsimba 72'		Ouro-Tagba 49'; Olivier 63'; Kastanaras 89'

== Competitions ==
=== Overall record ===
Competition	First match	Last match	Starting round	Final position	Record							
Competition	First match	Last match	Starting round	Final position	Pld	W	D	L	GF	GA	GD	Win %
Superliga Regular season	12 July 2025	8 March 2026	Matchday 1	1st	30	17	9	4	53	27	+26	56.67
Superliga Championship round	13 March 2026	25 May 2026	Matchday 1	Winners	10	6	2	2	12	6	+6	60.00
Cupa României	29 October 2025	13 May 2026	Group stage	Winners	6	3	3	0	14	5	+9	50.00
UEFA Conference League	24 July 2025	18 December 2025	Second qualifying round	League phase	12	6	1	5	22	16	+6	50.00
Total					58	32	15	11	101	54	+47	55.17

Source: Competitions

=== Superliga ===
==== Regular season ====
Pos	Team	Pld	W	D	L	GF	GA	GD	Pts	Qualification
1	Universitatea Craiova	30	17	9	4	53	27	+26	60	Advances to Play-off
2	Rapid București	30	16	8	6	47	30	+17	56	Advances to Play-off
3	Universitatea Cluj	30	16	6	8	48	27	+21	54	Advances to Play-off
4	CFR Cluj	30	15	8	7	49	40	+9	53	Advances to Play-off
5	Dinamo București	30	14	10	6	42	28	+14	52	Advances to Play-off

Source: LPF (in Romanian)
Rules for classification: 1) Points; 2) Head-to-head points; 3) Head-to-head goal difference; 4) Head-to-head goals scored; 5) Goal difference; 6) Goals scored; 7) Play-off.

==== Results summary ====
Overall								Home						Away					
Pld	W	D	L	GF	GA	GD	Pts	W	D	L	GF	GA	GD	W	D	L	GF	GA	GD
30	17	9	4	53	27	+26	60	11	3	1	30	11	+19	6	6	3	23	16	+7

==== Results by round ====
Round	1	2	3	4	5	6	7	8	9	10	11	12	13	14	15	16	17	18	19	20	21	22	23	24	25	26	27	28	29	30
Ground	A	H	H	A	H	A	H	A	H	A	H	A	H	A	H	H	A	A	H	A	H	A	H	A	H	A	H	A	H	A
Result	D	W	W	W	W	W	W	D	W	L	D	L	W	D	D	L	W	D	D	W	W	W	W	L	W	D	W	W	W	D
Position	4	2	2	2	1	1	1	1	1	1	1	3	3	3	3	4	3	4	4	4	1	1	1	1	1	1	1	1	1	1

A = Away; H = Home; W = Win; D = Draw; L = Loss

==== Matches ====
The competition schedule was drawn on 25 June 2025.

12 July 2025 1	UTA Arad	3–3	Universitatea Craiova	Arad
18:30 UTC+3	Popescu (yellow card) 5'; Benga (yellow card) 33'; Pospelov (yellow card) 47', (goal) 90+4'; Costache 81' (pen.); Roman 90+13'		Romanchuk 13'; Stevanović (yellow card) 15'; Baiaram 19' (pen.); Teles (yellow card) 45+1'; Ivan 49'; Crețu (yellow card) 85'	Stadium: Francisc von Neuman Stadium; Attendance: 7,348; Referee: Marian Barbu

18 July 2025 2	Universitatea Craiova	3–1	Argeș Pitești	Craiova
21:30 UTC+3	Sierra 16' (o.g.); Teles (yellow card) 26'; Rădulescu 39'; Baiaram 52', (yellow card) 47'		Sadriu 36', (yellow card) 65'; Rață (yellow card) 45+2'; Rădescu (yellow card) 55'; Obiang (yellow card) 82'	Stadium: Ion Oblemenco Stadium; Attendance: 10,054; Referee: Ionuț Coza

28 July 2025 3	Universitatea Craiova	2–1	Universitatea Cluj	Craiova
21:30 UTC+3	Al Hamlawi 87' (pen.), 90+1'		Silva 32'; Cristea (yellow card) 42'; Fábry (yellow card) 52'	Stadium: Ion Oblemenco Stadium; Attendance: 10,302; Referee: Marcel Bîrsan

3 August 2025 4	CFR Cluj	2–3	Universitatea Craiova	Cluj-Napoca
21:30 UTC+3	Ilie 64', 73', (yellow card) 90+6'; Camora (yellow card) 89'; Nkololo (yellow card) 90'		Houri (yellow card) 17'; Nsimba 20', 55'; Băsceanu (yellow card) 32'; Rădulescu 45', (yellow card) 90+8'; Stevanović (yellow card) 61'; Al Hamlawi (yellow card) 90+8'	Stadium: Dr. Constantin Rădulescu Stadium; Attendance: 3,633; Referee: Rareş Vidican

10 August 2025 5	Universitatea Craiova	1–0	Hermannstadt	Craiova
18:30 UTC+3	Romanchuk 31', (yellow card) 65'		Stoica (yellow card) 74'; Selimović (yellow card) 80'	Stadium: Ion Oblemenco Stadium; Attendance: 13,459; Referee: Andrei Chivulete

17 August 2025 6	Csíkszereda Miercurea Ciuc	1–2	Universitatea Craiova	Miercurea Ciuc
16:15 UTC+3	Szalay (yellow card) 1'; Lung Jr. 3' (o.g.); Szabó (yellow card) 40'; Bödő (yellow card) 43'; Pászka (yellow card) 90+5'		Nsimba 11', 69'; Mogos (yellow card) 40'; Screciu (yellow card) 81'	Stadium: Miercurea Ciuc Municipal Stadium; Attendance: 1,897; Referee: Baban Vlad

24 August 2025 7	Universitatea Craiova	2–0	Petrolul Ploiești	Craiova
18:30 UTC+3	Crețu 75'; Baiaram 80'		Jyry (yellow card) 28'; Bălbărău (yellow card) 64'	Stadium: Ion Oblemenco Stadium; Attendance: 16,263; Referee: Andrei Florin

31 August 2025 8	Botoșani	1–1	Universitatea Craiova	Botoșani
18:30 UTC+3	Ferreira (yellow card) 2'; Papa (yellow card) 8'; Cîmpanu (yellow card) 52'; Ongenda 72'; Petro (yellow card) 75'		Nsimba (yellow card) 35'; Cicâldău 62'	Stadium: Botoșani Municipal Stadium; Attendance: 6,126; Referee: Adrian Viorel Cojocaru

14 September 2025 9	Universitatea Craiova	2–0	Farul Constanța	Craiova
18:00 UTC+3	Nsimba 22', (yellow card) 37'; Romanchuk (yellow card) 35'; Matei (yellow card) 39'; Dican 76' (o.g.)		Sima (yellow card) 5'; Pellegrini (yellow card) 6'; Radaslavescu (yellow card) 19'; Ramalho (yellow card) 70'; Ganea (yellow card) 75'	Stadium: Ion Oblemenco Stadium; Attendance: 16,765; Referee: Bîrsan Marcel

20 September 2025 10	Oțelul Galați	1–0	Universitatea Craiova	Galați
21:00 UTC+3	Lameira (yellow card) 26', (goal) 44'; Iacob (yellow card) 32' (yellow-red card) 90+1'		Băluță (yellow card) 20'; Matei (yellow card) 22'; Etim (yellow card) 26'; Cicâldău (yellow card) 69'	Stadium: Oțelul Stadium; Referee: Horațiu Feșnic

26 September 2025 11	Universitatea Craiova	2–2	Dinamo București	Craiova
21:00 UTC+3				Stadium: Ion Oblemenco Stadium

5 October 2025 12	FCSB	1–0	Universitatea Craiova
20:30

18 October 2025 13	Universitatea Craiova	3–1	Unirea Slobozia
17:30

26 October 2025 14	Metaloglobus București	0–0	Universitatea Craiova
14:00

2 November 2025 15	Universitatea Craiova	2–2	Rapid București
20:30

9 November 2025 16	Universitatea Craiova	1–2	UTA Arad
17:30

21 November 2025 17	Argeș Pitești	1–2	Universitatea Craiova
20:30

1 December 2025 18	Universitatea Cluj	0–0	Universitatea Craiova
19:00

7 December 2025 19	Universitatea Craiova	1–1	CFR Cluj
20:30

14 December 2025 20	Hermannstadt	0–2	Universitatea Craiova
20:30

22 December 2025 21	Universitatea Craiova	5–0	Csíkszereda Miercurea Ciuc
20:00

19 January 2026 22	Petrolul Ploiești	0–4	Universitatea Craiova
20:00

24 January 2026 23	Universitatea Craiova	2–0	Botoșani
18:00

1 February 2026 24	Farul Constanța	4–1	Universitatea Craiova
17:15

5 February 2026 25	Universitatea Craiova	1–0	Oțelul Galați
18:00

9 February 2026 26	Dinamo București	1–1	Universitatea Craiova
20:00

15 February 2026 27	Universitatea Craiova	1–0	FCSB
20:00

22 February 2026 28	Unirea Slobozia	0–3	Universitatea Craiova
20:00

28 February 2026 29	Universitatea Craiova	2–1	Metaloglobus București
15:00

8 March 2026 30	Rapid București	1–1	Universitatea Craiova
20:00

==== Championship round ====
Pos	Team	Pld	W	D	L	GF	GA	GD	Pts	Qualification
1	Universitatea Craiova (C)	10	6	2	2	12	6	+6	50	Qualification to Champions League first qualifying round
2	Universitatea Cluj	10	6	1	3	13	11	+2	46	Qualification to Europa League first qualifying round (Note: The winner of the 2025–26 Cupa României (Universitatea Craiova) qualifies for the Europa League first qualifying round. Since the champions won the cup, this berth passed to the second place team.)
3	CFR Cluj	10	4	4	2	8	7	+1	43	Qualification to Conference League second qualifying round
4	Dinamo București	10	3	4	3	13	12	+1	39	Qualification to European competition play-offs

Source: LPF (in Romanian)
Rules for classification: 1) Points; 2) Points without rounding; 3) Points in the regular season; 4) Head-to-head points; 5) Head-to-head goal difference; 6) Head-to-head goals scored; 7) Goal difference; 8) Goals scored; 9) Play-off (only if needed to decide champion or teams for UEFA competitions). (Note: only criteria 7 and 8 are applied to establish the classification during the competition.
(C) Champions
Notes:

Round	1	2	3	4	5	6	7	8	9	10
Ground	H	A	H	A	H	A	H	A	H	A
Result	L	W	W	L	W	W	W	D	W	D
Position	2	1	1	2	1	1	1	1	1	1

A = Away; H = Home; W = Win; D = Draw; L = Loss

13 March 2026 1	Universitatea Craiova	0–1	Argeș Pitești	Craiova
20:30	Rus (yellow card) 45+1'; Houri (yellow card) 88'		Oancea (yellow card) 8'; Bettaieb 26', (yellow card) 69'; Brobbey (yellow card) 85'; Tudose (yellow card) 88'; Căbuz (yellow card) 90+6'	Stadium: Ion Oblemenco Stadium; Attendance: 14,611

19 March 2026 2	Dinamo București	0–1	Universitatea Craiova	Bucharest
20:30	Boateng (yellow card) 45'; Gnahoré (yellow card) 45'; Mazilu (yellow card) 54'; Sivis (yellow card) 83'; Pop (yellow card) 84'; Ikoko (yellow card) 84'		Crețu (yellow card) 45'; Etim 45+2'; Bancu (red card) 45+6'; Băluță (yellow card) 59'; Teles (yellow card) 84'; Rus (yellow card) 84'	Stadium: Arena Națională; Attendance: 8,924

6 April 2026 3	Universitatea Craiova	2–0	CFR Cluj	Craiova
20:30	Mekvabishvili (yellow card) 39', (goal) 57'; Al Hamlawi 62'; Romanchuk (yellow card) 67'; Nsimba (yellow card) 90+6'		Keïta (yellow card) 6'; Huja (yellow card) 24'; Popa (yellow card) 51'	Stadium: Ion Oblemenco Stadium; Attendance: 19,754

13 April 2026 4	Universitatea Cluj	4–0	Universitatea Craiova	Cluj-Napoca
21:30	Stanojev 6'; Lukić 45', 52'; Trică (yellow card) 86'; Nistor 88'		Etim (red card) 21'	Stadium: Cluj Arena; Attendance: 15,116

19 April 2026 5	Universitatea Craiova	1–0	Rapid București	Craiova
21:00	Al Hamlawi 47'; Teles (yellow card) 83'; Popescu (yellow card) 90+1'		Pașcanu (yellow card) 90+2'	Stadium: Ion Oblemenco Stadium; Attendance: 23,234; Referee: Szabolcs Kovacs

27 April 2026 6	Argeș Pitești	0–1	Universitatea Craiova	Mioveni
20:30	Tofan (yellow card) 45'; Borța (yellow card) 74'; Oancea (yellow card) 77'		Teles 10'; Mekvabishvili (yellow card) 54'; Cicâldău (yellow card) 68'; Romanchuk (yellow card) 79'; Ștefan (yellow card) 89'; Popescu (yellow card) 90+4'	Stadium: Orășenesc Stadium; Attendance: 4,542; Referee: Rareș Vidican

3 May 2026 7	Universitatea Craiova	2–1	Dinamo București	Craiova
21:00	Cicâldău 61'; Nsimba 90+1'		Stoinov 59'; Opruț (yellow card) 90+5'	Stadium: Ion Oblemenco Stadium; Attendance: 25,121; Referee: Szabolcs Kovacs

8 May 2026 8	CFR Cluj	0–0	Universitatea Craiova	Cluj-Napoca
21:00				Stadium: Dr. Constantin Rădulescu Stadium; Attendance: 9,068; Referee: István Kovács

17 May 2026 9	Universitatea Craiova	5–0	Universitatea Cluj	Craiova
20:30	Matei 3'; Al Hamlawi 8', 48'; Mora (yellow card) 45+1'; Mekvabishvili 59'; Băsceanu 72'; Bancu (yellow card) 87'		Nistor (yellow card) 10'; Mendy (yellow card) 27' (yellow-red card) 42'; Coubiș (yellow card) 38'; Chipciu (yellow card) 45+1'; Silva (yellow card) 89'; Drammeh (yellow card) 90+1'	Stadium: Ion Oblemenco Stadium; Attendance: 27,810; Referee: Marcel Bîrsan

25 May 2026 10	Rapid București	0–0	Universitatea Craiova	Bucharest
20:30				Stadium: Rapid-Giulești Stadium; Referee: Iuliana Demetrescu

==== Statistics SuperLiga ====
SuperLiga and SuperLiga play-off statistics
Round	Date	Match	Venue	Report	Result	Position	Attendance
1	12 July 2025	UTA Arad – Universitatea Craiova	Away	Report	3–3	4th	7,348
2	18 July 2025	Universitatea Craiova – Argeș Pitești	Home	Report	3–1	2nd	10,054
3	28 July 2025	Universitatea Craiova – Universitatea Cluj	Home	Report	2–1	2nd	10,302
4	3 August 2025	CFR Cluj – Universitatea Craiova	Away	Report	2–3	2nd	3,633
5	10 August 2025	Universitatea Craiova – Hermannstadt	Home	Report	1–0	1st	13,459
6	17 August 2025	Csíkszereda – Universitatea Craiova	Away	Report	1–2	1st	1,897
7	24 August 2025	Universitatea Craiova – Petrolul Ploiești	Home	Report	2–0	1st	16,263
8	31 August 2025	FC Botoșani – Universitatea Craiova	Away	Report	1–1	1st	6,126
9	14 September 2025	Universitatea Craiova – Farul Constanța	Home	Report	2–0	1st	16,765
10	20 September 2025	Oțelul Galați – Universitatea Craiova	Away	Report	1–0	1st	5,511
11	26 September 2025	Universitatea Craiova – Dinamo București	Home	Report	2–2	1st	22,440
12	5 October 2025	FCSB – Universitatea Craiova	Away	Report	1–0	3rd	5,187
13	18 October 2025	Universitatea Craiova – Unirea Slobozia	Home	Report	3–1	3rd	14,816
14	26 October 2025	Metaloglobus București – Universitatea Craiova	Away	Report	0–0	3rd	1,116
15	2 November 2025	Universitatea Craiova – Rapid București	Home	Report	2–2	3rd	18,574
16	9 November 2025	Universitatea Craiova – UTA Arad	Home	Report	1–2	4th	12,572
17	21 November 2025	Argeș Pitești – Universitatea Craiova	Away	Report	1–2	3rd	4,480
18	1 December 2025	Universitatea Cluj – Universitatea Craiova	Away	Report	0–0	4th	14,691
19	7 December 2025	Universitatea Craiova – CFR Cluj	Home	Report	1–1	4th	23,550
20	14 December 2025	Hermannstadt – Universitatea Craiova	Away	Report	0–2	4th	3,850
21	22 December 2025	Universitatea Craiova – Csíkszereda	Home	Report	5–0	1st	11,847
22	19 January 2026	Petrolul Ploiești – Universitatea Craiova	Away	Report	0–4	1st	4,297
23	24 January 2026	Universitatea Craiova – FC Botoșani	Home	Report	2–0	1st	12,365
24	1 February 2026	Farul Constanța – Universitatea Craiova	Away	Report	4–1	1st	3,010
25	5 February 2026	Universitatea Craiova – Oțelul Galați	Home	Report	1–0	1st	12,632
26	9 February 2026	Dinamo București – Universitatea Craiova	Away	Report	1–1	1st	10,197
27	15 February 2026	Universitatea Craiova – FCSB	Home	Report	1–0	1st	19,354
28	22 February 2026	Unirea Slobozia – Universitatea Craiova	Away	Report	0–3	1st	1,620
29	28 February 2026	Universitatea Craiova – Metaloglobus București	Home	Report	2–1	1st	14,520
30	8 March 2026	Rapid București – Universitatea Craiova	Away	Report	1–1	1st	9,919
SuperLiga play-off
PO 1	13 March 2026	Universitatea Craiova – Argeș Pitești	Home	Report	0–1	2nd	14,611
PO 2	19 March 2026	Dinamo București – Universitatea Craiova	Away	Report	0–1	1st	8,924
PO 3	6 April 2026	Universitatea Craiova – CFR Cluj	Home	Report	2–0	1st	19,754
PO 4	13 April 2026	Universitatea Cluj – Universitatea Craiova	Away	Report	4–0	2nd	15,116
PO 5	19 April 2026	Universitatea Craiova – Rapid București	Home	Report	1–0	1st	23,234
PO 6	27 April 2026	Argeș Pitești – Universitatea Craiova	Away	Report	0–1	1st	4,542
PO 7	3 May 2026	Universitatea Craiova – Dinamo București	Home	Report	2–1	1st	25,171
PO 8	8 May 2026	CFR Cluj – Universitatea Craiova	Away	Report	0–0	1st	9,068
PO 9	17 May 2026	Universitatea Craiova – Universitatea Cluj	Home	Report	5–0	1st Champions	27,810
PO 10	25 May 2026	Rapid București – Universitatea Craiova	Away	Report	0–0	1st Champions	12,338

=== Cupa României ===
==== Group stage ====
29 October 2025 1	Sănătatea Cluj	1–4	Universitatea Craiova	Cluj-Napoca
18:30	Stevanović 44' (o.g.)		Etim 61', 85'; Matei 77'; Cicâldău 88'

4 December 2025 2	Petrolul Ploiești	0–4	Universitatea Craiova	Ploiești
21:00			Romanchuk 10'; Etim 18'; Crețu 57'; Mekvabishvili 86'	Attendance: 1,822

12 February 2026 3	Universitatea Craiova	2–2	FCSB	Craiova
20:30	Rus 6'; Ștefan 54'; Stevanović (yellow card) 70'; Matei (yellow card) 90+2'; Isenko (yellow card) 90+5'		Bîrligea 16'; Popescu (yellow card) 50'; Thiam (yellow card) 61'; D. Popa 65'; Radunović (yellow card) 90+1'	Stadium: Ion Oblemenco Stadium; Attendance: 13,154; Referee: Horațiu Feșnic

==== Knockout stage ====
4 March 2026 Quarter-finals	Universitatea Craiova	3–1 (a.e.t.)	CFR Cluj	Craiova
20:30	Mora 69'; Crețu 105+1'; Baiaram 118'		Cordea 90'	Stadium: Ion Oblemenco Stadium; Attendance: 14,170; Referee: Marian Barbu

23 April 2026 Semi-finals	Dinamo București	1–1 (a.e.t.) (1–4 p)	Universitatea Craiova	Bucharest
20:30	Boateng 105'		Rus 118'	Stadium: Arena Națională; Attendance: 25,585; Referee: Marian Barbu
	Penalties
	Armstrong (penalty missed); Pop (penalty scored); Milanov (penalty missed)		(penalty scored) Al Hamlawi; (penalty scored) Rus; (penalty scored) Mora; (penalty scored) Teles

13 May 2026 Final	Universitatea Cluj	0–0 (a.e.t.) (5–6 p)	Universitatea Craiova	Sibiu
20:00				Stadium: Municipal Stadium; Attendance: 11,736; Referee: Marian Barbu
	Penalties
	Bic (penalty scored); Lukić (penalty scored); Chipciu (penalty scored); Mendy (penalty scored); Trică (penalty scored); Cristea (penalty missed)		(penalty scored) Al Hamlawi; (penalty scored) Mora; (penalty scored) Teles; (penalty scored) Romanchuk; (penalty scored) Mekvabishvili; (penalty scored) Crețu

=== UEFA Conference League ===
==== Second qualifying round ====
24 July 2025 First leg	Sarajevo (Bosnia and Herzegovina)	2–1	(Romania) Universitatea Craiova	Sarajevo, Bosnia and Herzegovina
21:00 UTC+2	Kyeremeh 10'; Guliashvili 20'		Romanchuk 69'	Stadium: Asim Ferhatović Hase Stadium; Attendance: 20,897; Referee: Dmytro Panchyshyn (Ukraine)

31 July 2025 Second leg	Universitatea Craiova (Romania)	4–0 (5–2 agg.)	(Bosnia and Herzegovina) Sarajevo	Craiova
20:37 UTC+3	Teles (yellow card) 33'; Al Hamlawi 51', 79', 83'; Cicâldău 68'; Isenko (yellow card) 86'; Houri (yellow card) 90+2'		Jatta (yellow card) 24'; Kyeremeh (yellow card) 46'; Bralić (yellow card) 74'	Stadium: Ion Oblemenco Stadium; Attendance: 19,600; Referee: Daniyar Sakhi (Kazakhstan)
Note: The match was delayed due to technical reasons.

==== Third qualifying round ====
7 August 2025 First leg	Universitatea Craiova (Romania)	3–0	(Slovakia) Spartak Trnava	Craiova
21:30 UTC+3	Baiaram 51'; Al Hamlawi 54'; Houri (yellow card) 72'; Mora 80'		Paur (red card) 87'; Kudlička (yellow card) 90+6'	Stadium: Ion Oblemenco Stadium; Attendance: 22,664; Referee: Joonas Jaanovits (Estonia)

14 August 2025 Second leg	Spartak Trnava (Slovakia)	4–3 (a.e.t.) (4–6 agg.)	(Romania) Universitatea Craiova	Trnava, Slovakia
20:30 UTC+2	Kratochvíl 36'; Nwadike 63'; Azango 68'; Kudlička 80', (yellow card) 99'; Mikovič (yellow card) 93'		Screciu (yellow card) 13'; Teles (yellow card) 30'; Baiaram 32'; Romanchuk (yellow card) 66'; Băluță 101'; Nsimba 117'	Stadium: Anton Malatinský Stadium; Attendance: 9,337; Referee: Stuart Attwell (England)

==== Play-off round ====
21 August 2025 First leg	İstanbul Başakşehir (Turkey)	1–2	(Romania) Universitatea Craiova	Başakşehir, Turkey
20:45 UTC+3	Şengezer (yellow card) 61'; Ebosele 87'; Özdemir (yellow card) 90+4'	Report	Isenko (yellow card) 41'; Cicâldău 45+2', (yellow card) 89'; Romanchuk (yellow card) 57'; Mora 61'; Bancu (yellow card) 75'	Stadium: Başakşehir Fatih Terim Stadium; Attendance: 7,230; Referee: Juxhin Xhaja (Albania)

28 August 2025 Second leg	Universitatea Craiova (Romania)	3–1 (5–2 agg.)	(Turkey) İstanbul Başakşehir	Craiova
20:30 UTC+3	Cicâldău 9'; Băluță (yellow card) 20'; Baiaram 27'; Badelj (yellow card) 54'; Bancu (yellow card) 63'; Nsimba 81'	Report	Selke 7', (yellow card) 54'; Shomurodov (yellow card) 54'; Operi (yellow card) 80' (yellow-red card) 81'; Güneş (yellow card) 90+1'	Stadium: Ion Oblemenco Stadium; Attendance: 27,884; Referee: Daniel Schlager (Germany)

==== League phase ====
The draw took place on 29 August 2025.

Pos	Team	Pld	W	D	L	GF	GA	GD	Pts	Qualification
23	(Football Association of Bosnia and Herzegovina#Table) Zrinjski Mostar	6	2	1	3	8	10	−2	7	Advance to knockout phase play-offs (unseeded)
24	(Football Association of the Czech Republic#Table) Sigma Olomouc	6	2	1	3	7	9	−2	7	Advance to knockout phase play-offs (unseeded)
25	(Romanian Football Federation#Table) Universitatea Craiova	6	2	1	3	6	8	−2	7	
26	(Gibraltar Football Association#Table) Lincoln Red Imps	6	2	1	3	7	15	−8	7	
27	(Ukrainian Association of Football#Table) Dynamo Kyiv	6	2	0	4	9	9	0	6	

Source: UEFA
Rules for classification: League phase tiebreakers

Round	1	2	3	4	5	6
Ground	A	H	A	H	H	A
Result	L	D	W	W	L	L
Position	28	28	20	15	23	25

A = Away; H = Home; W = Win; D = Draw; L = Loss

2 October 2025 1	Raków Częstochowa (Poland)	2–0	(Romania) Universitatea Craiova	Sosnowiec, Poland
21:00 UTC+2	Pieńko 47'; Repka 80'	Report		Stadium: Zagłębie Sports Park; Attendance: 6,557; Referee: Ishmael Barbara (Malta)

23 October 2025 2	Universitatea Craiova (Romania)	1–1	(Armenia) Noah	Craiova
22:00 UTC+3	Al Hamlawi (yellow card) 23'; Bancu (yellow card) 25'; Etim 38'	Report	Eteki (yellow card) 61'; Mulahusejnović 73'	Stadium: Ion Oblemenco Stadium; Attendance: 18,004; Referee: Gal Leibovitz (Israel)

6 November 2025 3	Rapid Wien (Austria)	0–1	(Romania) Universitatea Craiova	Vienna, Austria
21:00 UTC+1	Wurmbrand (yellow card) 1'; Seidl (yellow card) 4'; Kara (yellow card) 18'; Gulliksen (yellow card) 20'; Ahoussou (yellow card) 66'		Rus (yellow card) 20'; Romanchuk 37'; Teles (yellow card) 49'; Mora (yellow card) 51'	Stadium: Allianz Stadion; Attendance: 23,457; Referee: Martin Matoša (Slovenia)

27 November 2025 4	Universitatea Craiova (Romania)	1–0	(Germany) Mainz 05	Craiova
19:45 UTC+2	Rus (yellow card) 41'; Baiaram (yellow card) 45+4'; Al Hamlawi 67' (pen.); Bancu (yellow card) 72'; Isenko (yellow card) 90+2'		Bell (yellow card) 12'; Amiri (yellow card) 57'	Stadium: Ion Oblemenco Stadium; Attendance: 24,284; Referee: Dario Bel (Croatia)

11 December 2025 5	Universitatea Craiova (Romania)	1–2	(Czech Republic) Sparta Prague	Craiova
19:45 UTC+2	Mekvabishvili (penalty missed) , 38; Nsimba 79'; Romanchuk (yellow card) 90+2'		Preciado (yellow card) 10'; Rrahmani 50'; Sørensen (yellow card) 53'; Ryneš 89'; Kuol (yellow card) 90+1'	Stadium: Ion Oblemenco Stadium; Attendance: 20,210; Referee: Jasper Vergoote (Belgium)

18 December 2025 6	AEK Athens (Greece)	3–2	(Romania) Universitatea Craiova	Athens, Greece
22:00 UTC+2	Vida (yellow card) 5', (goal) 65'; Kutesa (yellow card) 82', (goal) 90+8'; Rota (yellow card) 90+12'; Jović 90+15' (pen.)		Baiaram 30', (yellow card) 72'; Cicâldău 59'; Teles (yellow card) 82'; Crețu (yellow card) 90+2'; Isenko (yellow card) 90+4' (red card) 90+16'; Bancu (yellow card) 90+11'	Stadium: Agia Sophia Stadium; Attendance: 26,021; Referee: Giorgi Kruashvili (Georgia)

== Statistics ==
=== Goalscorers ===
Rank	Pos	Player	Superliga	Cupa României	Conference League	Total
1	FW	(Palestine) Assad Al Hamlawi	11	0	5	16
2	FW	(France) Steven Nsimba	10	0	3	13
3	FW	(Romania) Ștefan Baiaram	7	1	4	12
4	MF	(Romania) Alexandru Cicâldău	3	1	4	8
4	FW	(Nigeria) Monday Etim	4	3	1	8
6	DF	(Ukraine) Oleksandr Romanchuk	3	1	2	6
7	MF	(Romania) David Matei	4	1	0	5
7	DF	(Costa Rica) Carlos Mora	2	1	2	5
9	MF	(Georgia (country)) Anzor Mekvabishvili	3	1	0	4
9	DF	(Romania) Adrian Rus	2	2	0	4
11	MF	(Romania) Alexandru Crețu	1	2	0	3
12	MF	(Romania) David Barbu	2	0	0	2
12	MF	(Romania) Tudor Băluță	1	0	1	2
12	FW	(Romania) Luca Băsceanu	2	0	0	2
12	MF	(Romania) Mihnea Rădulescu	2	0	0	2
12	MF	(Portugal) Samuel Teles	2	0	0	2
17	DF	(Croatia) Juraj Badelj	1	0	0	1
17	DF	(Romania) Nicușor Bancu	1	0	0	1
17	FW	(Romania) Andrei Ivan	1	0	0	1
17	DF	(Romania) Vladimir Screciu	1	0	0	1
17	DF	(Romania) Florin Ștefan	0	1	0	1
17	DF	(Serbia) Nikola Stevanović	1	0	0	1
Own goals			2	0	0	2
Total			65	14	22	101

Tabelul de mai jos include toate cele 58 de meciuri oficiale: 40 în SuperLiga, 6 în Cupa României și 12 în UEFA Conference League. Universitatea Craiova a încheiat sezonul ca campioană a României și câștigătoare a Cupei României.

Prezențele care nu apar individual în sursele disponibile sunt marcate cu —, pentru a nu introduce valori neverificate.

==== Statistics ====
All competitions statistics
Match	Date	Match / Opponent	Round	Competition	Venue	Report	Result	Position / Series	Attendance
1	12 July 2025	UTA Arad – Universitatea Craiova	1	SuperLiga	Away	Report	3–3	4th	7,348
2	18 July 2025	Universitatea Craiova – Argeș Pitești	2	SuperLiga	Home	Report	3–1	2nd	10,054
3	24 July 2025	Sarajevo – Universitatea Craiova	2Q 1	Conference League	Away	Report	2–1	1–2	20,897
4	28 July 2025	Universitatea Craiova – Universitatea Cluj	3	SuperLiga	Home	Report	2–1	2nd	10,302
5	31 July 2025	Universitatea Craiova – Sarajevo	2Q 2	Conference League	Home	Report	4–0	5–2; Qualified	19,600
6	3 August 2025	CFR Cluj – Universitatea Craiova	4	SuperLiga	Away	Report	2–3	2nd	3,633
7	7 August 2025	Universitatea Craiova – Spartak Trnava	3Q 1	Conference League	Home	Report	3–0	3–0	22,664
8	10 August 2025	Universitatea Craiova – Hermannstadt	5	SuperLiga	Home	Report	1–0	1st	13,459
9	14 August 2025	Spartak Trnava – Universitatea Craiova	3Q 2	Conference League	Away	Report	4–3 (a.e.t.)	6–4; Qualified	9,337
10	17 August 2025	Csíkszereda – Universitatea Craiova	6	SuperLiga	Away	Report	1–2	1st	1,897
11	21 August 2025	İstanbul Başakşehir – Universitatea Craiova	PO 1	Conference League	Away	Report	1–2	1–2	7,230
12	24 August 2025	Universitatea Craiova – Petrolul Ploiești	7	SuperLiga	Home	Report	2–0	1st	16,263
13	28 August 2025	Universitatea Craiova – İstanbul Başakşehir	PO 2	Conference League	Home	Report	3–1	5–2; Qualified for league phase	27,884
14	31 August 2025	FC Botoșani – Universitatea Craiova	8	SuperLiga	Away	Report	1–1	1st	6,126
15	14 September 2025	Universitatea Craiova – Farul Constanța	9	SuperLiga	Home	Report	2–0	1st	16,765
16	20 September 2025	Oțelul Galați – Universitatea Craiova	10	SuperLiga	Away	Report	1–0	1st	—
17	26 September 2025	Universitatea Craiova – Dinamo București	11	SuperLiga	Home	Report	2–2	1st	—
18	2 October 2025	Raków Częstochowa – Universitatea Craiova	1	Conference League	Away	Report	2–0	28th	6,557
19	5 October 2025	FCSB – Universitatea Craiova	12	SuperLiga	Away	Report	1–0	3rd	—
20	18 October 2025	Universitatea Craiova – Unirea Slobozia	13	SuperLiga	Home	Report	3–1	3rd	—
21	23 October 2025	Universitatea Craiova – Noah	2	Conference League	Home	Report	1–1	28th	18,004
22	26 October 2025	Metaloglobus București – Universitatea Craiova	14	SuperLiga	Away	Report	0–0	3rd	—
23	29 October 2025	Sănătatea Cluj – Universitatea Craiova	GS 1	Cupa României	Away	Report	1–4	1st	—
24	2 November 2025	Universitatea Craiova – Rapid București	15	SuperLiga	Home	Report	2–2	3rd	—
25	6 November 2025	Rapid Wien – Universitatea Craiova	3	Conference League	Away	Report	0–1	20th	23,457
26	9 November 2025	Universitatea Craiova – UTA Arad	16	SuperLiga	Home	Report	1–2	4th	—
27	21 November 2025	Argeș Pitești – Universitatea Craiova	17	SuperLiga	Away	Report	1–2	3rd	—
28	27 November 2025	Universitatea Craiova – Mainz 05	4	Conference League	Home	Report	1–0	15th	24,284
29	1 December 2025	Universitatea Cluj – Universitatea Craiova	18	SuperLiga	Away	Report	0–0	4th	—
30	4 December 2025	Petrolul Ploiești – Universitatea Craiova	GS 2	Cupa României	Away	Report	0–4	1st	1,822
31	7 December 2025	Universitatea Craiova – CFR Cluj	19	SuperLiga	Home	Report	1–1	4th	—
32	11 December 2025	Universitatea Craiova – Sparta Prague	5	Conference League	Home	Report	1–2	23rd	20,210
33	14 December 2025	Hermannstadt – Universitatea Craiova	20	SuperLiga	Away	Report	0–2	4th	—
34	18 December 2025	AEK Athens – Universitatea Craiova	6	Conference League	Away	Report	3–2	25th Eliminated	26,021
35	22 December 2025	Universitatea Craiova – Csíkszereda	21	SuperLiga	Home	Report	5–0	1st	—
36	19 January 2026	Petrolul Ploiești – Universitatea Craiova	22	SuperLiga	Away	Report	0–4	1st	—
37	24 January 2026	Universitatea Craiova – FC Botoșani	23	SuperLiga	Home	Report	2–0	1st	—
38	1 February 2026	Farul Constanța – Universitatea Craiova	24	SuperLiga	Away	Report	4–1	1st	—
39	5 February 2026	Universitatea Craiova – Oțelul Galați	25	SuperLiga	Home	Report	1–0	1st	—
40	9 February 2026	Dinamo București – Universitatea Craiova	26	SuperLiga	Away	Report	1–1	1st	—
41	12 February 2026	Universitatea Craiova – FCSB	GS 3	Cupa României	Home	Report	2–2	Qualified for quarter-finals	13,154
42	15 February 2026	Universitatea Craiova – FCSB	27	SuperLiga	Home	Report	1–0	1st	—
43	22 February 2026	Unirea Slobozia – Universitatea Craiova	28	SuperLiga	Away	Report	0–3	1st	—
44	28 February 2026	Universitatea Craiova – Metaloglobus București	29	SuperLiga	Home	Report	2–1	1st	—
45	4 March 2026	Universitatea Craiova – CFR Cluj	QF	Cupa României	Home	Report	3–1 (a.e.t.)	Qualified for semi-finals	14,170
46	8 March 2026	Rapid București – Universitatea Craiova	30	SuperLiga	Away	Report	1–1	1st Qualified for play-off	—
47	13 March 2026	Universitatea Craiova – Argeș Pitești	PO 1	SuperLiga play-off	Home	Report	0–1	2nd	14,611
48	19 March 2026	Dinamo București – Universitatea Craiova	PO 2	SuperLiga play-off	Away	Report	0–1	1st	8,924
49	6 April 2026	Universitatea Craiova – CFR Cluj	PO 3	SuperLiga play-off	Home	Report	2–0	1st	19,754
50	13 April 2026	Universitatea Cluj – Universitatea Craiova	PO 4	SuperLiga play-off	Away	Report	4–0	2nd	15,116
51	19 April 2026	Universitatea Craiova – Rapid București	PO 5	SuperLiga play-off	Home	Report	1–0	1st	23,234
52	23 April 2026	Dinamo București – Universitatea Craiova	SF	Cupa României	Away	Report	1–1 (a.e.t.); 1–4 (p)	Qualified for final	25,585
53	27 April 2026	Argeș Pitești – Universitatea Craiova	PO 6	SuperLiga play-off	Away	Report	0–1	1st	4,542
54	3 May 2026	Universitatea Craiova – Dinamo București	PO 7	SuperLiga play-off	Home	Report	2–1	1st	25,121
55	8 May 2026	CFR Cluj – Universitatea Craiova	PO 8	SuperLiga play-off	Away	Report	0–0	1st	9,068
56	13 May 2026	Universitatea Cluj – Universitatea Craiova	F	Cupa României	Neutral	Report	0–0 (a.e.t.); 5–6 (p)	Champions	11,736
57	17 May 2026	Universitatea Craiova – Universitatea Cluj	PO 9	SuperLiga play-off	Home	Report	5–0	1st Champions	27,810
58	25 May 2026	Rapid București – Universitatea Craiova	PO 10	SuperLiga play-off	Away	Report	0–0	1st Champions	—

== Statistics ==
=== Attendances from season to season ===
Includes all competitive home, away and neutral-site matches.
Last updated on 1 July 2026.

Season	Game type	SuperLiga total	SuperLiga matches	SuperLiga average	Cupa României total	Cupa României matches	Cupa României average	UEFA Conference League qualifying total	UEFA Conference League qualifying matches	UEFA Conference League qualifying average	UEFA Conference League total	UEFA Conference League matches	UEFA Conference League average	Total	Matches	Average
2025–26	Home	321,871	20	16,094	27,324	2	13,662	70,188	3	23,396	62,498	3	20,833	481,881	28	17,210
2025–26	Away	127,077	20	6,354	27,407 (Note: The Cupa României final is counted as a neutral-site match. One Cupa României away match did not show a separate attendance figure in the match list; totals follow the available season attendance figures.)	3	9,136	37,464	3	12,488	56,035	3	18,678	247,983	29	8,551
2025–26	Neutral	0	0	—	11,736	1	11,736	0	0	—	0	0	—	11,736	1	11,736
2025–26	Total	448,948	40	11,224	66,467	6	11,078	107,652	6	17,942	118,533	6	19,756	741,600	58	12,786
