= 2026 Supercupa României =

- Event: 2026 Supercupa României
Universitatea Craiova	Universitatea Cluj
Liga I	Cupa României
1	1
- Universitatea Craiova won 5–3 on penalties
- Date: 12 July 2026
- Venue: Ion Oblemenco Stadium, Craiova
- Referee: Iulian Călin
- Attendance: 14,120

The 2026 Supercupa României was the 28th edition of the Supercupa României, an annual football super cup contested by the winners of the previous seasons Liga I and Cupa României competitions.

The game featured Universitatea Craiova and Universitatea Cluj, and Ion Oblemenco Stadium in Craiova hosted the final for the first time on 12 July 2026. Universitatea Craiova won the match making it their second Supercupa Romaniei title.

== Teams ==
Team	Qualification	Previous participations (bold indicates winners)
Universitatea Criaova	Winners of the 2025–26 Liga I	1 (2021)
Universitatea Cluj	Runners-up of the 2025–26 Cupa României	None

== Match ==
=== Details ===
12 July 2026
20:30 EEST (UTC+03:00)

Universitatea Craiova	1–1	Universitatea Cluj
Nsimba 40'	Report	Aliev 56'
Penalties
Al-Hamlawi (penalty scored); Rus (penalty scored); Cicâldău (penalty scored); Mora (penalty scored); Mekvabishvili (penalty scored)	5–3	(penalty scored) Chipciu; (penalty missed) Macalou; (penalty scored) Ștefănescu; (penalty scored) Drammeh

Ion Oblemenco Stadium, Craiova
Attendance: 14,120
Referee: Iulian Călin

GK	90	(Romania) Răzvan Sava
CB	3	(Ukraine) Oleksandr Romanchuk
CB	6	(Romania) Vladimir Screciu	(substituted off) 63'
CB	24	(Serbia) Nikola Stevanović	(substituted off) 90+2'
RWB	17	(Costa Rica) Carlos Mora
CM	8	(Romania) Tudor Băluță
CM	5	(Georgia (country)) Anzor Mekvabishvili
LWB	11	(Romania) Nicușor Bancu (c)
RW	30	(Romania) David Matei
CF	7	(France) Steven Nsimba	(substituted off) 63'
LW	10	(Romania) Ștefan Baiaram
Substitutes:
GK	21	(Romania) Laurențiu Popescu
DF	28	(Romania) Adrian Rus	(substituted on) 63'
DF	15	(Croatia) Juraj Badelj
DF	23	(Portugal) Samuel Teles
MF	4	(Romania) Alexandru Crețu
MF	20	(Romania) Alexandru Cicâldău
MF	18	(Romania) Mihnea Rădulescu
FW	12	(Nigeria) Monday Etim
FW	22	(France) Simon Elisor	(substituted on) 63'
FW	29	(Romania) Luca Băsceanu
FW	9	(Palestine) Assad Al Hamlawi	(substituted on) 90+2'
FW	19	(Cape Verde) Heri Tavares
Manager:
(Portugal) Filipe Coelho

GK	1	(Romania) Ștefan Lefter
RB	33	(Serbia) Jug Stanojev
CB	6	(Romania) Iulian Cristea
CB	22	(Martinique) Florent Poulolo	(substituted off) 46'
LB	27	(Romania) Alexandru Chipciu (c)
CM	8	(Romania) Dorin Codrea
CM	98	(Romania) Gabriel Simion	(substituted off) 46'
RW	18	(Portugal) Pedro Pinho
CAM	10	(Romania) Dan Nistor
LW	94	(Romania) Ovidiu Bic
ST	25	(Sweden) Alibek Aliev	(yellow card) 65'
Substitutes:
GK	46	(Cyprus) Neofytos Michail
GK	99	(Romania) Tudor Coșa
DF	4	(Romania) Andrei Coubiș
DF	59	(Romania) Alin Techereș
DF	2	(Romania) Alin Chinteș
DF	12	(Nigeria) Friday Adams
MF	14	(Romania) Marius Ștefănescu	(substituted on) 46'
MF	7	(The Gambia) Mouhamadou Drammeh
FW	19	(Ivory Coast) Issouf Macalou	(substituted on) 46'
FW	29	(France) Oucasse Mendy
FW	20	(Nigeria) Ibuchi Chukwu
FW	9	(Romania) Atanas Trică
Manager:
(Italy) Cristiano Bergodi

**MATCH OFFICIALS**

- Assistant referees:
  - Florin Neacșu
  - Marin Nicușor
- Fourth official:
  - Florin Andrei
- Reserve referee:
  - Laszlo Imre Bucsi
- VAR:
  - Adrian Cojocaru
- Assistant VAR:
  - Valentin Porumbel
- Reserve VAR:
  - Marcel Bîrsan
  - Sorin Costreie

**MATCH RULES**

- 90 minutes.
- Penalty shoot-out if scores were level.
- No extra time.
- Twelve named substitutes.
- Maximum of five substitutions.

== See also ==
- 2026–27 Liga I
- 2026–27 Cupa României
