= Mihnea Rădulescu =

Romanian footballer (born 2005)

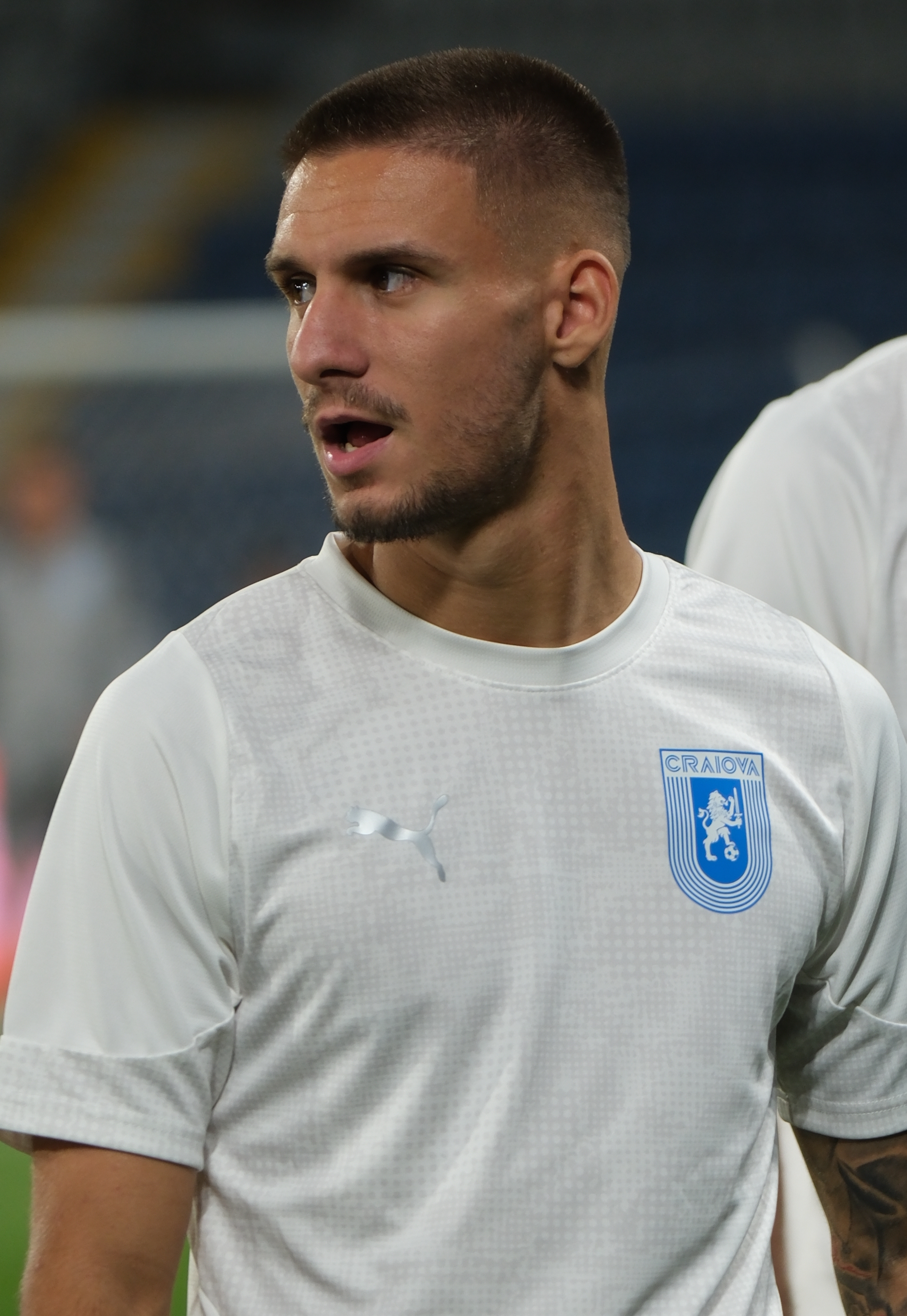
- Rădulescu with Universitatea Craiova in 2025

Personal information
- Full name: Mihnea Gabriel Rădulescu
- Date of birth: 17 September 2005 (age 21)
- Place of birth: Ploiești, Romania
- Height: 1.80 m (5 ft 11 in)
- Position: Winger

Team information
- Current team: Universitatea Craiova/CSM Slatina
- Number: 18/

Youth career
- 2013–2023: Petrolul Ploiești

Senior career*
Years	Team	Apps	(Gls)
2022–2025	Petrolul Ploiești	48	(5)
2024	→ Gloria Buzău (loan)	11	(4)
2025–	Universitatea Craiova	16	(2)
2026–	CSM Slatina	0	(0)

International career^{‡}
2023–2024	Romania U19	11	(1)
2024–2025	Romania U20	4	(1)
2024–2025	Romania U21	3	(1)
- * Club domestic league appearances and goals as of 1 November 2026 ‡ National team caps and goals as of 5 September 2025

Mihnea Gabriel Rădulescu (born 17 September 2005) is a Romanian professional footballer who plays as a winger for Liga I club Universitatea Craiova and for Liga II club CSM Slatina.

A youth product of Petrolul Ploiești, Rădulescu made his senior debut for the team in 2022, aged 16. He became a regular starter following a loan to Gloria Buzău in 2024, and one year later transferred to Universitatea Craiova. There, he won the championship title and the Cupa României in his first season at the club.

Internationally, Rădulescu represented Romania at several youth levels.

== Club career ==
=== Petrolul Ploiești ===
A youth product of his hometown club Petrolul Ploiești, Rădulescu made his senior debut on 15 May 2022, coming on as a 74th-minute substitute for Saim Tudor in a goalless Liga II away draw against Unirea Slobozia. He made his professional debut on 10 April 2023, replacing Jair in the 90th minute of a 2–0 home Liga I victory over Mioveni.

On 23 January 2024, Rădulescu was loaned to Liga II side Gloria Buzău for the remainder of the season. He scored his first career goal on 25 February, in a 5–1 away win over Progresul Spartac, and added three more goals in a total of eleven appearances during the loan spell.

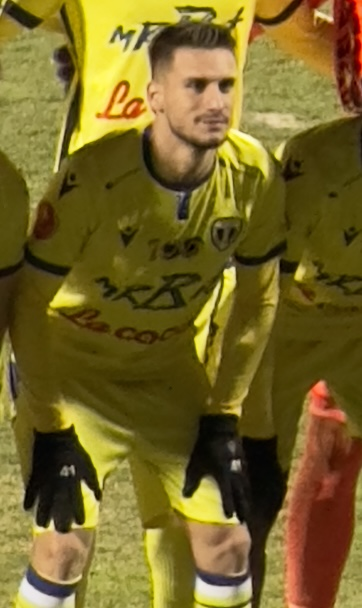
Rădulescu lining up for Petrolul Ploiești in January 2025

Upon returning to Ploiești, Petrolul manager Mehmet Topal handed Rădulescu his first league start on 16 August 2024, in a 2–1 away victory over Unirea Slobozia, where he opened the scoring. On 27 September, he scored his first brace in a 4–1 home win against Hermannstadt. He finished the 2024–25 Liga I season with 35 appearances and five goals, as his team placed ninth in the league table.

=== Universitatea Craiova ===
On 20 May 2025, Rădulescu transferred to fellow league club Universitatea Craiova for a rumoured fee of €400,000 plus 15% interest. He made his official debut on 12 July, starting in a 3–3 away draw at UTA Arad in the season opener, and six days later scored in a 3–1 home win over Argeș Pitești.

Rădulescu scored two goals in 12 appearances before suffering a cruciate ligament injury in October 2025, which sidelined him for approximately half a year. He returned in the final match of the campaign, a goalless draw against Rapid București on 25 May 2026, as Craiova secured a domestic double consisting of the Liga I title and the Cupa României.

== International career ==
In October 2024, Rădulescu was called up to the Romania national under-21 team for the final UEFA Euro 2025 qualifiers. He debuted as a substitute and scored in a 6–2 win over Montenegro on 11 October, and played in the 3–1 victory against Switzerland four days later, helping Romania qualify for their fourth consecutive European Under-21 Championship.

== Style of play ==
Rădulescu is a dynamic left-footed footballer who operates as a winger, favoring the right flank to capitalize on his ability to cut inside. He stated that "the hardest football is simple football", reflecting his commitment to effective and straightforward play.

Rădulescu cited Lionel Messi and compatriot Gheorghe Hagi as his role models growing up.

== Personal life ==
Rădulescu's elder brother is a tourist guide, and their father played football in the lower leagues of Prahova County.

== Career statistics ==
As of match played 1 November 2026

Appearances and goals by club, season and competition
Club	Season	League			Cupa României		Europe		Other		Total	
Club	Season	Division	Apps	Goals	Apps	Goals	Apps	Goals	Apps	Goals	Apps	Goals
Petrolul Ploiești	2021–22	Liga II	1	0	—		—		—		1	0
Petrolul Ploiești	2022–23	Liga I	1	0	0	0	—		—		1	0
Petrolul Ploiești	2023–24	Liga I	11	0	2	0	—		—		13	0
Petrolul Ploiești	2024–25	Liga I	35	5	3	0	—		—		38	5
Petrolul Ploiești	Total		48	5	5	0	—		—		53	5
Gloria Buzău (loan)	2023–24	Liga II	11	4	—		—		—		11	4
Universitatea Craiova	2025–26	Liga I	13	2	0	0	0	0	—		13	2
Universitatea Craiova	2026–27	Liga I	3	0	2	0	0	0	0	0	5	0
Universitatea Craiova	Total		16	2	2	0	0	0	0	0	18	2
CSM Slatina	2026–27	Liga II	0	0	—		—		—		0	0
Career total			75	11	7	0	0	0	0	0	82	11

== Honours ==
Petrolul Ploiești

- Liga II: 2021–22

Universitatea Craiova

- Liga I: 2025–26
- Cupa României: 2025–26
- Supercupa României: 2026
