= Ștefan Baiaram =

Romanian footballer (born 2002)

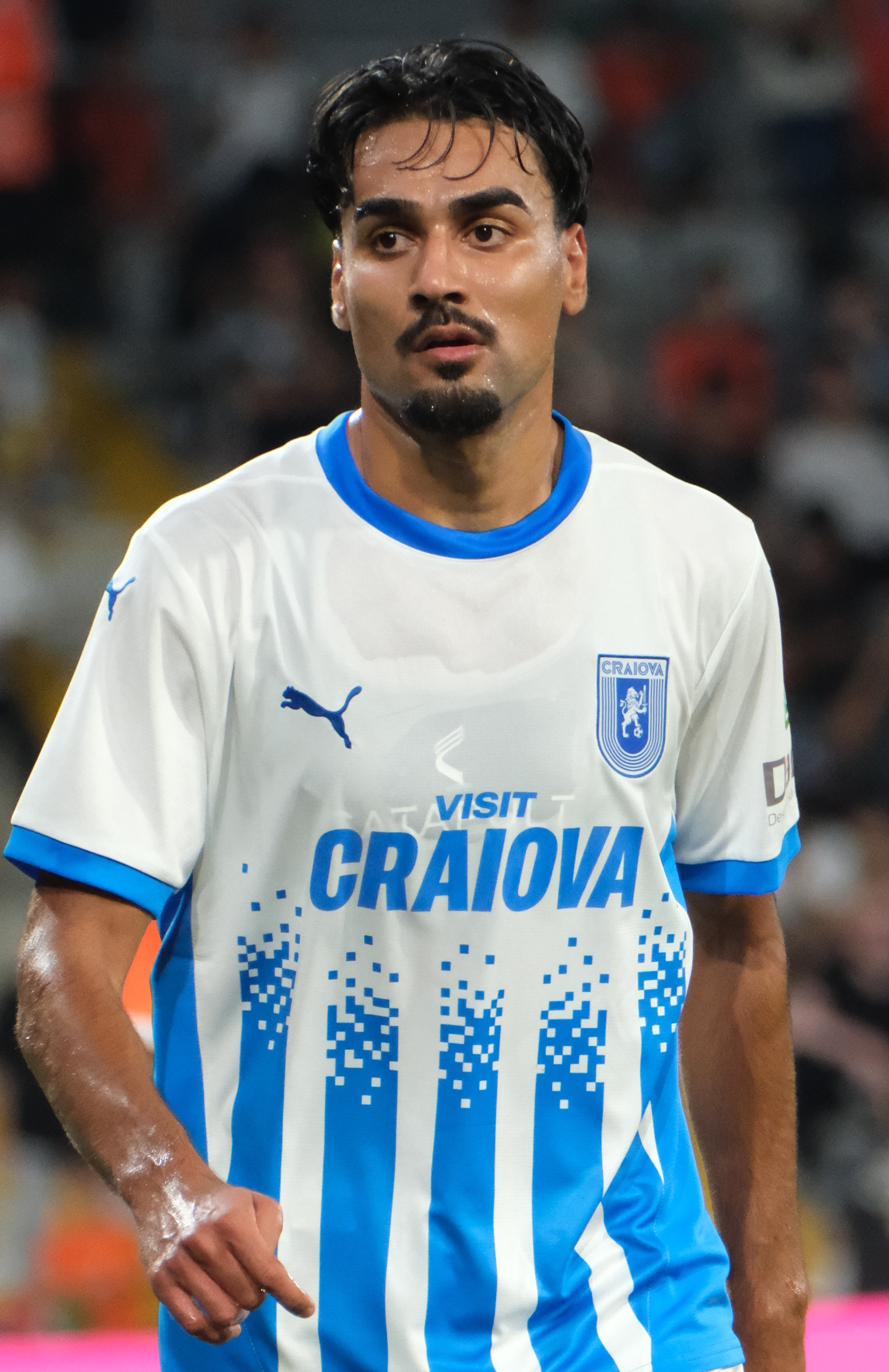
- Baiaram with Universitatea Craiova in 2025

Personal information
- Date of birth: 31 December 2002 (age 23)
- Place of birth: Băilești, Romania
- Height: 1.85 m (6 ft 1 in)
- Position: Winger

Team information
- Current team: Universitatea Craiova
- Number: 10

Youth career
- 2008–2009: FEFS Craiova
- 2009–2010: Luceafărul Craiova
- 2010–2014: Casa Bogdan
- 2014–2019: Universitatea Craiova

Senior career*
Years	Team	Apps	(Gls)
2019–	Universitatea Craiova	218	(41)

International career^{‡}
2019	Romania U17	2	(0)
2021	Romania U20	4	(1)
2021–2025	Romania U21	15	(2)
2025–	Romania	6	(1)
- * Club domestic league appearances and goals as of 1 November 2026 ‡ National team caps and goals as of 6 June 2026

Ștefan Baiaram (born 31 December 2002) is a Romanian professional footballer who plays as a winger for Liga I club Universitatea Craiova and the Romania national team.

== Club career ==
Baiaram made his professional debut for Universitatea Craiova on 11 July 2019, replacing Bogdan Vătăjelu in a 3–2 victory over Sabail in the UEFA Europa League first qualifying round. He made his Liga I debut three days later in a 3–2 win against Academica Clinceni, and finished his first senior season with 13 appearances in all competitions.

On 27 August 2020, Baiaram scored his first goal for the club in a 1–2 defeat to Locomotive Tbilisi in the Europa League first qualifying round. He scored his first Liga I goal on 6 March 2021, securing a 1–0 victory over Botoșani. On 15 May that year, Baiaram found the net in a 1–3 league defeat to defending champions CFR Cluj, and one week later appeared in a 3–2 victory over Astra Giurgiu in the Cupa României final. Ahead of the 2022–23 campaign, he was assigned the number 10 shirt.

On 28 August 2025, Baiaram scored in a 3–1 victory over İstanbul Başakşehir, as Craiova qualified for the league phase of the Conference League for the first time. On 18 December, he opened the scoring in a 2–3 loss to AEK Athens. During the 2025–26 season, Baiaram amassed seven goals from 37 league appearances, with the club winning both the Liga I title and the Cupa României.

== International career ==
Baiaram represented Romania at several youth levels, including the under-17, under-20, and under-21 sides. He made his senior debut on 9 October 2025, in a 2–1 friendly win against Moldova.

On 17 November 2025, Baiaram scored his first senior international goal in a 7–1 victory over San Marino counting for the 2026 FIFA World Cup qualification.

== Personal life ==
Baiaram was born in Băilești, Romania. He was abandoned as an infant and later adopted by a family in Craiova, where he was raised and introduced to football.

== Career statistics ==
=== Club ===
As of match played 5 November 2026

Appearances and goals by club, season and competition
Club	League	Season			Cupa României		Europe		Other		Total	
Club	League	Division	Apps	Goals	Apps	Goals	Apps	Goals	Apps	Goals	Apps	Goals
Universitatea Craiova	Liga I	2019–20	11	0	1	0	1 (Note: Appearance in UEFA Europa League)	0	—		13	0
Universitatea Craiova	Liga I	2020–21	31	2	4	0	1	1	—		36	3
Universitatea Craiova	Liga I	2021–22	35	8	4	0	0	0	1 (Note: Appearance in Liga I European play-offs)	0	39	8
Universitatea Craiova	Liga I	2022–23	27	3	1	0	6 (Note: Appearances in UEFA Conference League)	1	—		34	4
Universitatea Craiova	Liga I	2023–24	28	8	3	1	—		0	0	31	9
Universitatea Craiova	Liga I	2024–25	38	11	3	1	2	0	—		43	12
Universitatea Craiova	Liga I	2025–26	37	7	2	1	11	4	—		50	12
Universitatea Craiova	Liga I	2026–27	11	2	1	0	11 (Note: Four appearances and one goal in UEFA Champions League, four appearances and one goal in UEFA Europa League, three appearances and one goal in UEFA Conference League)	3	1 (Note: Appearance in Supercupa României)	0	24	5
Career total			218	41	19	3	32	9	2	0	271	53

=== International ===
As of match played 6 June 2026.

Appearances and goals by national team and year
National team	Year	Apps	Goals
Romania
Romania	2025	2	1
Romania	2026	4	0
Total		6	1

Scores and results list Romania's goal tally first, score column indicates score after each Baiaram goal

List of international goals scored by Ștefan Baiaram
No.	Date	Venue	Cap	Opponent	Score	Result	Competition
1	18 November 2025	Ilie Oană, Ploiești, Romania	2	San Marino	2–1	7–1	2026 FIFA World Cup qualification

== Honours ==
Universitatea Craiova

- Liga I: 2025–26
- Cupa României: 2020–21, 2025–26
- Supercupa României: 2021, 2026

Individual

- Liga I Team of the Season: 2024–25
