= Carlos Mora (footballer) =

Costa Rican footballer (born 2001)

- Mora with Universitatea Craiova in 2025

Personal information
- Full name: Carlos Andrei Mora Montoya
- Date of birth: 18 March 2001 (age 25)
- Place of birth: San José, Costa Rica
- Height: 1.78 m (5 ft 10 in)
- Positions: Winger; wing-back

Team information
- Current team: Universitatea Craiova
- Number: 17

Youth career
- –2020: Alajuelense

Senior career*
Years	Team	Apps	(Gls)
2020–2024	Alajuelense	181	(30)
2024–	Universitatea Craiova	75	(3)

International career^{‡}
2023	Costa Rica Olympic	1	(0)
2022–	Costa Rica	27	(4)
- * Club domestic league appearances and goals as of 1 November 2026 ‡ National team caps and goals as of 4 October 2026

Carlos Andrei Mora Montoya (born 18 March 2001), is a Costa Rican professional footballer who plays as a winger or a wing-back for Liga I club Universitatea Craiova and the Costa Rica national team.

== Club career ==
Mora joined Liga Deportiva Alajuelense as a youngster and played age groups levels from under-15 where he was heavily tutored by Mauricio Montero. He made his full team debut on 16 February, 2020, when he replaced Ariel Lassiter as a substitute in a 1–0 away victory over Santos de Guápiles. He scored for his first goal for the club on the 4 November, 2020 in a CONCACAF League match against Cibao FC of the Dominican Republic which his side won 3–0. Mora was in the squad when his team won the 2020 CONCACAF League Final 3–2 against Saprissa on 3 February, 2021.He is currently playing at CSU Craiova, in Romania, trained by Felipe Coelho. He played in multiple UEFA Conference League qualifying rounds with Craiova against teams such as Rapid Viena or Spartak Trnava, in which he scored once.

== International career ==
Mora received his first call up for the Costa Rica national team for matches against Canada, El Salvador, and United States and subsequently made his first appearance for the national team on 30 March, 2022 against the United States.

== Career statistics ==
=== Club ===
As of match played 5 November 2026

Appearances and goals by club, season and competition
Club	Season	League			National cup (Note: Includes Costa Rican Cup, Cupa României)		Continental		Other		Total	
Club	Season	Division	Apps	Goals	Apps	Goals	Apps	Goals	Apps	Goals	Apps	Goals
Alajuense	2019–20	Liga FPD	7	0	—		—		—		7	0
Alajuense	2020–21	Liga FPD	39	2	—		5 (Note: Appearances in CONCACAF League)	1	—		44	3
Alajuense	2021–22	Liga FPD	49	7	—		1	0	1 (Note: Appearance in Supercopa de Costa Rica)	0	51	7
Alajuense	2022–23	Liga FPD	40	10	6	0	11 (Note: Two appearances in CONCACAF Champions Cup, nine appearances in CONCACAF League)	0	—		57	10
Alajuense	2023–24	Liga FPD	46	10	1	1	8 (Note: Appearances in CONCACAF Central American Cup)	1	—		55	12
Alajuense	Total		181	30	7	0	25	2	1	0	214	32
Universitatea Craiova	2024–25	Liga I	33	1	4	1	2 (Note: Appearances in UEFA Conference League)	0	—		39	2
Universitatea Craiova	2025–26	Liga I	28	2	4	1	10	2	—		42	5
Universitatea Craiova	2026–27	Liga I	14	0	1	0	10 (Note: Four appearances in UEFA Champions League, four appearances and one goal in UEFA Europa League, two appearances in UEFA Conference League)	1	1 (Note: Appearance in Supercupa României)	0	26	1
Universitatea Craiova	Total		75	3	9	2	22	3	1	0	107	8
Career total			256	33	16	2	47	5	2	0	321	40

=== International ===
As of match played 4 October 2026

Appearances and goals by national team and year
National team	Year	Apps	Goals
Costa Rica	2022	4	0
Costa Rica	2023	4	0
Costa Rica	2025	11	0
Costa Rica	2026	8	4
Total		27	4

Scores and results list Costa Rica's goal tally first, score column indicates score after each Mora goal.

List of international goals scored by Carlos Mora
No.	Date	Venue	Cap	Opponent	Score	Result	Competition
1	24 September 2026	Ricardo Saprissa Aymá, San José, Costa Rica	24	Curaçao	2–0	3–4	2026–27 CONCACAF Nations League A
2	24 September 2026	Ricardo Saprissa Aymá, San José, Costa Rica	24	Curaçao	3–0	3–4	2026–27 CONCACAF Nations League A
3	1 October 2026	Estadio Nacional de Fútbol, Managua, Nicaragua	26	Nicaragua	2–0	3–0	2026–27 CONCACAF Nations League A
4	4 October 2026	Ricardo Saprissa Aymá, San José, Costa Rica	27	Haiti	1–0	2–0	2026–27 CONCACAF Nations League A

== Honours ==
Alajuelense

- Liga FPD: 2020 Apertura
- Costa Rican Cup: 2023
- Supercopa de Costa Rica runner-up: 2023
- CONCACAF League: 2020
- CONCACAF Central American Cup: 2023

Universitatea Craiova

- Liga I: 2025–26
- Cupa României: 2025–26
- Supercupa Românieiː 2026

Individual

- Liga I Team of the Season: 2025–26
