= 2025–26 FCV Farul Constanța season =

FCV Farul Constanța
2025–26 season
- Manager: Ianis Zicu (until 13 April); Flavius Stoican (from 13 April)
- Stadium: Central Stadium
- Superliga: Regular season: 11th
- Superliga: Relegation play-outs: 13th
- Relegation play-offs: First leg
- Cupa României: Group stage
- Top goalscorer: Alexandru Ișfan (10)
- Biggest win: CS Dinamo București 0–4 Farul Constanța
- Biggest defeat: Universitatea Craiova 2–0 Farul Constanța; Rapid București 3–1 Farul Constanța
Home colours	Away colours	Third colours

FCV Farul Constanța is competing in its 106th season overall and its fifth consecutive season in Liga I and the Cupa României. In the cup competition, the team was eliminated in the group stage. On April 13, head coach Ianis Zicu resigned following a defeat to Hermannstadt.

== Transfers ==
=== In ===
Pos.	Player	Transferred from	Fee	Date	Source
MF	(Portugal) Diogo Ramalho	(Portugal) Sporting da Covilhã		1 July 2025	
FW	(Slovakia) Jakub Vojtuš	(Romania) Unirea Slobozia		1 July 2025	
FW	(Romania) Alexandru Ișfan	(Romania) Universitatea Craiova	Free	9 July 2025	
DF	(Cape Verde) Steve Furtado	(Bulgaria) CSKA 1948	Free	18 July 2025	
FW	(Romania) Jovan Marković	(Romania) Universitatea Craiova		14 August 2025	
MF	(North Macedonia) Boban Nikolov	Unattached	Free	16 September 2025	
FW	(Romania) Denis Alibec	(Romania) FCSB	Free	30 January 2026	

=== Out ===
Pos.	Player	Transferred to	Fee	Date	Source
FW	(Romania) Luca Băsceanu	(Romania) Universitatea Craiova	€1,000,000	1 July 2025	
MF	(Romania) Andrei Ciobanu	(Romania) Oțelul Galați	Free	1 July 2025	
MF	(Brazil) Reginaldo	(Lithuania) DFK Dainava	Free	1 July 2025	
DF	(Brazil) João Vítor Kaminski Borba Ferreira	(Portugal) GD Chaves B	Free	6 July 2025	
MF	(Romania) Ianis Avrămescu	(Italy) Parma U20	Undisclosed	1 August 2025	
DF	(Portugal) Fábio Baptista	(Romania) Concordia Chiajna	Loan	6 September 2025	
DF	(Romania) Gabriel Buta	(Romania) Slatina	Free	8 September 2025	
MF	(North Macedonia) Boban Nikolov	(North Macedonia) Vardar	Contract terminated	30 January 2026	
GK	(Romania) Răzvan Ducan	(Romania) Unirea Alba Iulia	Free	12 February 2026	

== Pre-season and friendlies ==
18 June 2025	Farul Constanța (Romania)	1–2	(Bulgaria) Cherno More Varna

21 June 2025	Farul Constanța (Romania)	0–1	(Bulgaria) Fratria Varna

27 June 2025	Farul Constanța (Romania)	2–1	(Romania) Oțelul Galați

29 June 2025	Farul Constanța (Romania)	0–1	(Albania) Egnatia

30 June 2025	Farul Constanța (Romania)	1–3	(Kosovo) Drita

4 July 2025	Farul Constanța (Romania)	3–0	(Serbia) Radnički Niš

5 September 2025	Farul Constanța (Romania)	1–1	(Bulgaria) Cherno More Varna

10 January 2026	Farul Constanța (Romania)	1–2	(Bulgaria) Cherno More Varna

11 January 2026	Botoșani (Romania)	1–0	(Romania) Farul Constanța

29 March 2026	Ludogorets Razgrad (Bulgaria)	3–2	(Romania) Farul Constanța

== Competitions ==
=== Superliga ===
==== Regular season ====
Pos	Team	Pld	W	D	L	GF	GA	GD	Pts	Qualification
9	Botoșani	30	11	9	10	37	29	+8	42	Advances to Play-out
10	Oțelul Galați	30	11	8	11	39	32	+7	41	Advances to Play-out
11	Farul Constanța	30	10	7	13	39	37	+2	37	Advances to Play-out
12	Petrolul Ploiești	30	7	11	12	24	31	−7	32	Advances to Play-out
13	Csíkszereda Miercurea Ciuc	30	8	8	14	30	58	−28	32	Advances to Play-out

Source: LPF (in Romanian)
Rules for classification: 1) Points; 2) Head-to-head points; 3) Head-to-head goal difference; 4) Head-to-head goals scored; 5) Goal difference; 6) Goals scored; 7) Play-off.

===== Matches =====
14 July 2025 1	Botoșani	1–1	Farul Constanța
19:00

20 July 2025 2	Farul Constanța	3–2	Oțelul Galați
18:30

26 July 2025 3	FCSB	1–2	Farul Constanța
21:30

1 August 2025 4	Farul Constanța	2–1	Metaloglobus București
19:00

9 August 2025 5	UTA Arad	2–1	Farul Constanța
18:30

18 August 2025 6	Farul Constanța	0–1	Universitatea Cluj
21:30

25 August 2025 7	Hermannstadt	1–0	Farul Constanța
19:00

1 September 2025 8	Farul Constanța	2–1	Petrolul Ploiești
21:00

14 September 2025 9	Universitatea Craiova	2–0	Farul Constanța
18:00

22 September 2025 10	Dinamo București	1–1	Farul Constanța
21:00

28 September 2025 11	Farul Constanța	1–1	Unirea Slobozia
17:30

4 October 2025 12	Rapid București	3–1	Farul Constanța
20:30

17 October 2025 13	Farul Constanța	0–0	Argeș Pitești
20:30

25 October 2025 14	CFR Cluj	0–2	Farul Constanța
21:00

3 November 2025 15	Farul Constanța	3–0	Csíkszereda
17:30

7 November 2025 16	Farul Constanța	2–0	Botoșani
20:30

23 November 2025 17	Oțelul Galați	2–2	Farul Constanța
17:30

30 November 2025 18	Farul Constanța	1–2	FCSB
20:30

7 December 2025 19	Metaloglobus București	2–1	Farul Constanța
17:30

15 December 2025 20	Farul Constanța	1–1	UTA Arad
17:30

21 December 2025 21	Universitatea Cluj	1–0	Farul Constanța
16:30

17 January 2026 22	Farul Constanța	1–1	Hermannstadt
17:15

25 January 2026 23	Petrolul Ploiești	0–1	Farul Constanța
14:30

1 February 2026 24	Farul Constanța	4–1	Universitatea Craiova
17:15

4 February 2026 25	Farul Constanța	2–3	Dinamo București
20:30

7 February 2026 26	Unirea Slobozia	2–1	Farul Constanța
13:00

15 February 2026 27	Farul Constanța	3–1	Rapid București
17:00

22 February 2026 28	Argeș Pitești	1–0	Farul Constanța
15:00

28 February 2026 29	Farul Constanța	1–2	CFR Cluj
20:00

6 March 2026 30	Csíkszereda	1–0	Farul Constanța
19:30

==== Relegation play-outs ====
Pos	Team	Pld	W	D	L	GF	GA	GD	Pts	Qualification or relegation
11	Csíkszereda Miercurea Ciuc	9	5	2	2	11	8	+3	33 (Note: Botoșani is ahead of Csíkszereda Miercurea Ciuc on points from the regular season.)	
12	Petrolul Ploiești	9	2	3	4	9	15	−6	25	
13	Farul Constanța (O)	9	1	3	5	8	11	−3	25	Qualification to relegation play-offs
14	Hermannstadt (R)	9	3	4	2	13	10	+3	25	Qualification to relegation play-offs
15	Unirea Slobozia (R)	9	2	3	4	11	13	−2	22	Relegated to Liga II

Source: LPF (in Romanian)
Rules for classification: 1) Points; 2) Points without rounding; 3) Points in the regular season; 4) Head-to-head points; 5) Head-to-head goal difference; 6) Head-to-head goals scored; 7) Goal difference; 8) Goals scored; 9) Play-off (only if needed to decide champion or teams for UEFA competitions). (Note: only criteria 7 and 8 are applied to establish the classification during the competition.
(O) Play-off winners; (R) Relegated
Notes:

Round	1	2	3	4	5	6	7	8	9
Ground	H	A	H	A	H	A	H	A	H
Result	W	D	L	L	L	D	D	L	L
Position									

A = Away; H = Home; W = Win; D = Draw; L = Loss

15 March 2026 1	Farul Constanța	2–0	Petrolul Ploiești	Constanța
15:00

21 March 2026 2	Csíkszereda	1–1	Farul Constanța
17:30

5 April 2026 4	Farul Constanța	0–1	Unirea Slobozia	Constanța
17:30

10 April 2026 4	Hermannstadt	1–0	Farul Constanța
19:00

20 April 2026 5	Farul Constanța	2–3	FCSB	Constanța
20:30

26 April 2026 6	UTA Arad	0–0	Farul Constanța
14:00

2 May 2026 7	Farul Constanța	1–1	FC Botoșani	Constanța
17:30

9 May 2026 8	Oțelul Galați	3–2	Farul Constanța
18:00

18 May 2026 9	Farul Constanța	0–1	Metaloglobus București	Constanța
20:30

==== Relegation play-offs ====
23 May 2026 First leg	Chindia Târgoviște	3–3	Farul Constanța	Târgoviște
20:30

31 May 2026 Second leg	Farul Constanța	1−1 (a.e.t.) (4−2 p)	Chindia Târgoviște	Constanța
20:30

=== Cupa României ===
==== Play-off round ====
28 August 2025 Play-off round	Corvinul Hunedoara	0–1	Farul Constanța
17:00

==== Group stage ====
Group 4

Pos	Team	Pld	W	D	L	GF	GA	GD	Pts	Qualification	HER	DIN	CON	FAR	BOT	CSD
1	Hermannstadt	2	2	0	0	4	1	+3	6	Advance to knockout phase	—	—	—	—	—	—
2	FC Dinamo București	2	1	1	0	3	1	+2	4	Advance to knockout phase	11 Feb	—	—	—	—	—
3	Concordia Chiajna	2	1	0	1	3	1	+2	3		0–1	—	—	—	11 Feb	—
4	Farul Constanța	2	0	2	0	1	1	0	2		—	0–0	—	—	—	—
5	Botoșani	2	0	1	1	2	4	−2	1		1–3	—	—	1–1	—	—
6	CS Dinamo București	2	0	0	2	1	6	−5	0		—	1–3	0–3	11 Feb	—	—

Updated to match(es) played on 3 December 2025. Source: FRF

30 October 2025 1	Botoșani	1–1	Farul Constanța
19:00

30 October 2025 2	Farul Constanța	0–0	Dinamo București
18:30

12 February 2026 3	CS Dinamo București	0–4	Farul Constanța
18:00
