= Cristian Sima =

Romanian footballer (born 2008)

Personal information
- Date of birth: 6 January 2007 (age 19)
- Place of birth: Constanța, Romania
- Height: 1.83 m (6 ft 0 in)
- Position: Winger

Team information
- Current team: Farul Constanța
- Number: 28

Youth career
- 2018–: Gheorghe Hagi Academy

Senior career*
Years	Team	Apps	(Gls)
2025–	Farul Constanța	22	(1)
- * Club domestic league appearances and goals as of 20 September 2026

Cristian Sima (born 6 January 2007) is a Romanian professional footballer who plays as a winger for Liga I club Farul Constanța.

== Career statistics ==
As of match played 20 September 2026

Appearances and goals by club, season and competition
Club	Season	League			Cupa României		Europe		Other		Total	
Club	Season	Division	Apps	Goals	Apps	Goals	Apps	Goals	Apps	Goals	Apps	Goals
Farul Constanța	2025–26	Liga I	14	0	3	0	—		0	0	17	0
Farul Constanța	2026–27	Liga I	8	1	1	0	—		—		9	1
Career total			22	1	4	0	—		0	0	26	1
