= Alin Chinteș =

Romanian footballer (born 2006)

Personal information
- Full name: Alin Marian Chinteș
- Date of birth: 7 February 2006 (age 20)
- Place of birth: Bistrița, Romania
- Height: 1.75 m (5 ft 9 in)
- Position: Right-back

Team information
- Current team: Universitatea Cluj
- Number: 2

Youth career
- –2018: FC Bistrița
- 2018–2021: Galactic Bistrița
- 2021–2024: Universitatea Cluj

Senior career*
Years	Team	Apps	(Gls)
2024–	Universitatea Cluj	18	(0)
2024–2025	→ Unirea Ungheni (loan)	26	(0)

International career^{‡}
2022–2023	Romania U17	6	(0)
2023	Romania U18	5	(0)
2024–2025	Romania U19	10	(0)
2025–	Romania U20	4	(0)
- * Club domestic league appearances and goals as of 3 August 2026 ‡ National team caps and goals as of 17 November 2026

Alin Marian Chinteș (born 7 February 2006) is a Romanian professional footballer who plays as a right-back for Liga I club Universitatea Cluj.

== Career statistics ==
As of 28 October 2026

Appearances and goals by club, season and competition
Club	Season	League			Cupa României		Europe		Other		Total	
Club	Season	Division	Apps	Goals	Apps	Goals	Apps	Goals	Apps	Goals	Apps	Goals
Universitatea Cluj	2023–24	Liga I	5	0	0	0	—		2 (Note: Appearances in Liga I European play-offs)	0	7	0
Universitatea Cluj	2025–26	Liga I	10	0	1	0	1 (Note: Appearances in UEFA Conference League)	0	—		12	0
Universitatea Cluj	2026–27	Liga I	3	0	2	0	1 (Note: Appearance in UEFA Europa League)	0	0	0	6	0
Universitatea Cluj	Total		18	0	3	0	2	0	2	0	25	0
Unirea Ungheni (loan)	2024–25	Liga II	26	0	4	0	—		—		30	0
Career total			44	0	7	0	2	0	2	0	55	0

== Honours ==
Universitatea Cluj

- Cupa României runner-up: 2025–26
- Supercupa României runner-up: 2026
