= Juraj Badelj =

Croatian footballer (born 2003)

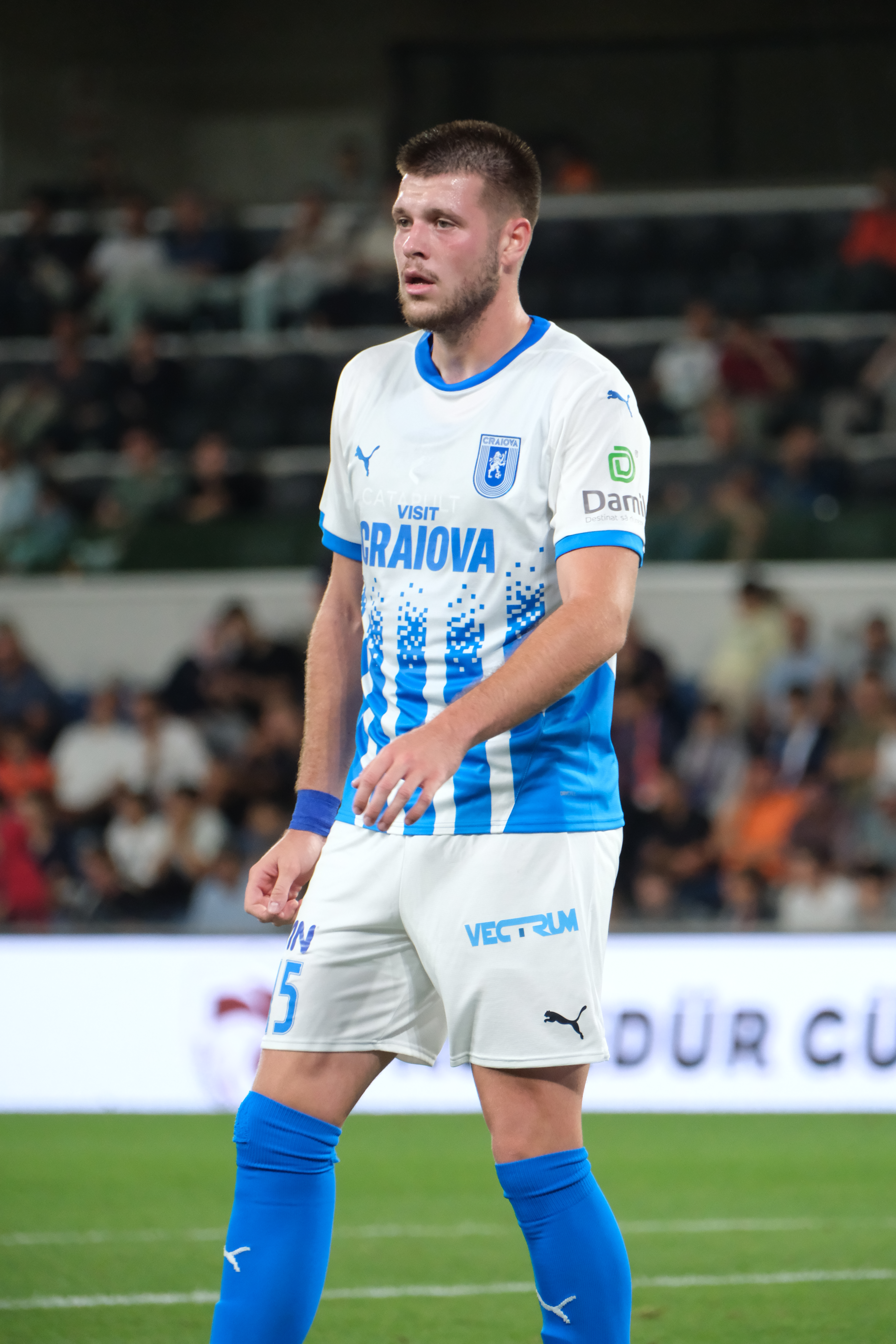
- Badelj with Universitatea Craiova in 2025

Personal information
- Date of birth: 24 August 2003 (age 23)
- Place of birth: Zagreb, Croatia
- Height: 1.90 m (6 ft 3 in)
- Position: Defender

Team information
- Current team: Aris Limassol
- Number: 27

Youth career
- –2017: Lokomotiva Zagreb
- 2017–2022: Hrvatski Dragovoljac
- 2022–2023: Rudeš

Senior career*
Years	Team	Apps	(Gls)
2023–2026	Universitatea Craiova	56	(1)
2026–	Aris Limassol	4	(0)

International career
2024	Croatia U21	2	(0)
- * Club domestic league appearances and goals as of 18:36, 20 September 2026 (UTC)

Juraj Badelj (born 24 August 2003) is a Croatian professional footballer who plays as a defender for Cypriot First Division club Aris Limassol.

== Career statistics ==
As of match played 20 September 2026

Appearances and goals by club, season and competition
Club	Season	League			National cup (Note: Includes Cupa României)		Europe		Other		Total	
Club	Season	Division	Apps	Goals	Apps	Goals	Apps	Goals	Apps	Goals	Apps	Goals
Universitatea Craiova	2022–23	Liga I	7	0	—		—		—		7	0
Universitatea Craiova	2023–24	Liga I	15	0	2	0	—		0	0	17	0
Universitatea Craiova	2024–25	Liga I	21	0	1	0	1 (Note: Appearance(s) in UEFA Conference League)	0	—		23	0
Universitatea Craiova	2025–26	Liga I	12	1	4	0	10	0	—		26	1
Universitatea Craiova	2026–27	Liga I	1	0	—		1 (Note: Appearance in UEFA Champions League)	0	0	0	2	0
Universitatea Craiova	Total		56	1	7	0	12	0	0	0	75	1
Aris Limassol	2026–27	Cypriot First Division	4	0	0	0	—		—		4	0
Career total			60	1	7	0	12	0	0	0	79	1

== Honours ==
Universitatea Craiova

- Liga I: 2025–26
- Cupa României: 2025–26
- Supercupa Românieiː 2026
