= Pedro Pinho (footballer, born 2000) =

Portuguese footballer (born 2000)

Personal information
- Full name: Pedro Nuno Almeida Pinho
- Date of birth: 6 April 2000 (age 26)
- Place of birth: Vale de Cambra, Portugal
- Height: 1.89 m (6 ft 2 in)
- Position: Defensive midfielder

Team information
- Current team: Universitatea Cluj
- Number: 18

Youth career
- 2008–2009: GDC Lordelo
- 2009–2010: Estarreja
- 2010–2013: Porto
- 2013–2018: Sanjoanense
- 2018: Espinho
- 2019: Académica

Senior career*
| Years | Team | Apps | (Gls) |
| 2019–2021 | Académica U23 | 45 | (8) |
| 2021–2022 | Académica | 0 | (0) |
| 2021–2022 | → Sanjoanense (loan) | 24 | (2) |
| 2022–2023 | Sanjoanense | 26 | (3) |
| 2023–2026 | Chaves | 70 | (7) |
| 2026– | Universitatea Cluj | 12 | (0) |
- * Club domestic league appearances and goals as of 7 November 2026

Pedro Nuno Almeida Pinho (born 6 April 2000) is a Portuguese professional footballer who plays as a defensive midfielder for Liga I club Universitatea Cluj.

== Career statistics ==
As of match played 7 November 2026

Appearances and goals by club, season and competition
| Club | Season | League | | | National Cup (Note: Includes Taça de Portugal, Cupa României) | | Europe | | Other | | Total | |
| Club | Season | Division | Apps | Goals | Apps | Goals | Apps | Goals | Apps | Goals | Apps | Goals |
|---|---|---|---|---|---|---|---|---|---|---|---|---|
| Académica U23 | 2019–20 | Liga Revelação | 22 | 0 | — | | — | | — | | 22 | 0 |
| Académica U23 | 2020–21 | Liga Revelação | 23 | 8 | — | | — | | — | | 23 | 8 |
| Académica U23 | Total | | 45 | 8 | — | | — | | — | | 45 | 8 |
| Sanjoanense (loan) | 2021–22 | Liga 3 | 24 | 2 | 1 | 0 | — | | — | | 25 | 2 |
| Sanjoanense | 2022–23 | Liga 3 | 26 | 3 | 2 | 0 | — | | — | | 28 | 3 |
| Sanjoanense | Total | | 50 | 5 | 3 | 0 | — | | — | | 53 | 5 |
| Chaves | 2023–24 | Primeira Liga | 10 | 1 | 1 | 0 | — | | 1 (Note: Appearances in Taça da Liga) | 0 | 12 | 1 |
| Chaves | 2024–25 | Liga Portugal 2 | 30 | 3 | 3 | 0 | — | | — | | 33 | 3 |
| Chaves | 2025–26 | Liga Portugal 2 | 30 | 3 | 2 | 0 | — | | — | | 32 | 3 |
| Chaves | Total | | 70 | 7 | 6 | 0 | — | | 1 | 0 | 77 | 7 |
| Universitatea Cluj | 2026–27 | Liga I | 12 | 0 | 1 | 0 | 4 (Note: Two appearances in UEFA Europa League, two appearances and one goal in UEFA Conference League) | 1 | 1 (Note: Appearances in Supercupa României) | 0 | 18 | 1 |
| Career total | | | 177 | 20 | 10 | 0 | 4 | 1 | 2 | 0 | 193 | 21 |

== Honours ==
Universitatea Cluj

- Supercupa României runner-up: 2026
