= Oleksandr Romanchuk (footballer, born 1999) =

Ukrainian footballer (born 1999)

- Romanchuk with Universitatea Craiova in 2025

Personal information
- Full name: Oleksandr Bohdanovych Romanchuk
- Date of birth: 16 December 1999 (age 26)
- Place of birth: Kolomyia, Ukraine
- Height: 1.93 m (6 ft 4 in)
- Position: Centre-back

Team information
- Current team: Universitatea Craiova
- Number: 3

Youth career
- 2010–2016: Prykarpattia Ivano-Frankivsk
- 2016–2017: Lviv

Senior career*
Years	Team	Apps	(Gls)
2016–2018	Lviv	45	(0)
2018–2020	Dynamo-2 Kyiv	31	(1)
2020–2022	Lviv	33	(1)
2022–2024	Debrecen	44	(0)
2024–2025	Kryvbas Kryvyi Rih	25	(1)
2025–	Universitatea Craiova	44	(6)

International career^{‡}
2019	Ukraine U21	3	(0)
2026–	Ukraine	1	(0)
- * Club domestic league appearances and goals as of 1 November 2026 ‡ National team caps and goals as of 31 May 2026

Oleksandr Bohdanovych Romanchuk (Ukrainian: Олександр Богданович Романчук; born 16 December 1999) is a Ukrainian professional footballer who plays as a centre-back for Liga I club Universitatea Craiova and the Ukraine national team.

== Club career ==
Romanchuk was born in the Ivano-Frankivsk Oblast and progressed through the academy of Prykarpattia Ivano-Frankivsk, before moving to the youth system of Lviv in 2016.

He broke into Lviv's senior set-up in the Ukrainian Second League, and in July 2018 joined Dynamo Kyiv of the Ukrainian Premier League, although he did not feature for the first team.

Romanchuk returned to Lviv in August 2020, appearing for the reserve side before making his top flight debut on 12 September 2020, coming on as a second-half substitute in a 0–4 away loss to Kolos Kovalivka.

On 20 July 2022, Romanchuk moved abroad for the first time, signing for Nemzeti Bajnokság I club Debrecen.

Romanchuk returned to Ukraine on 25 July 2024, agreeing a three-year contract with Kryvbas Kryvyi Rih.

On 7 July 2025, Romanchuk signed a three-year contract with Romanian first division team Universitatea Craiova for a rumoured fee of €750,000. He made his official debut on 12 July 2025, opening the scoring in a 3–3 away Liga I draw at UTA Arad.

== Career statistics ==
=== Club ===
As of match played 5 November 2026

Appearances and goals by club, season and competition
Club	Season	League			National cup (Note: Includes Ukrainian Cup, Cupa României)		Europe		Other		Total	
Club	Season	Division	Apps	Goals	Apps	Goals	Apps	Goals	Apps	Goals	Apps	Goals
Lviv	2016–17	Ukrainian Amateur Championship	18	0	5	1	—		—		23	1
Lviv	2017–18	Ukrainian Second League	27	0	4	0	—		—		31	0
Lviv	Total		45	0	9	1	—		—		54	1
Dynamo-2 Kyiv	2018–19	Ukrainian Premier League Reserves	18	0	—		—		—		18	0
Dynamo-2 Kyiv	2019–20	Ukrainian Premier League Reserves	13	1	—		—		—		18	0
Dynamo-2 Kyiv	Total		31	1	—		—		—		31	1
Lviv	2020–21	Ukrainian Premier League	19	0	1	0	—		—		20	0
Lviv	2021–22	Ukrainian Premier League	14	1	1	0	—		—		15	1
Lviv	Total		33	1	2	0	—		—		35	1
Debrecen	2022–23	NB I	21	0	2	0	—		—		23	0
Debrecen	2023–24	NB I	23	0	3	1	4 (Note: Appearances in UEFA Conference League)	0	—		30	1
Debrecen	Total		44	0	5	1	4	0	—		53	1
Kryvbas Kryvyi Rih	2024–25	Ukrainian Premier League	25	1	1	0	4 (Note: Two appearances in UEFA Europa League, two appearances in UEFA Conference League)	0	—		30	1
Universitatea Craiova	2025–26	Liga I	32	3	4	1	12	2	—		48	6
Universitatea Craiova	2026–27	Liga I	12	3	1	0	9 (Note: Three appearances in UEFA Champions League, three appearances in UEFA Europa League, three appearances in UEFA Conference League)	0	1 (Note: Appearance in Supercupa României)	0	23	3
Universitatea Craiova	Total		44	6	5	1	21	2	1	0	71	9
Career total			222	7	22	3	29	2	1	0	274	12

=== International ===
As of match played 31 May 2026

Romanchuk with Kryvbas Kryvyi Rih in 2024

Appearances and goals by national team and year
National team	Year	Apps	Goals
Ukraine	2026	1	0
Total		1	0

== Honours ==
Universitatea Craiova

- Liga I: 2025–26
- Cupa României: 2025–26
- Supercupa Românieiː 2026

Individual

- Liga I Team of the Season: 2025–26
