= Alexandru Iamandache =

Romanian footballer (born 1999)

Personal information
- Full name: Florian Alexandru Iamandache
- Date of birth: 14 September 1999 (age 27)
- Place of birth: Târgoviște, Romania
- Height: 1.75 m (5 ft 9 in)
- Position: Left winger

Team information
- Current team: Universitatea Craiova
- Number: 14

Youth career
- –2018: CSȘ Târgoviște

Senior career*
Years	Team	Apps	(Gls)
2018–2022	Pucioasa	52	(11)
2022	→ ASU Politehnica Timișoara (loan)	7	(1)
2022–2026	Afumați	24	(9)
2026–	Universitatea Craiova	0	(0)
2026–	Universitatea II Craiova	2	(0)
- * Club domestic league appearances and goals as of 10 February 2026

Florian Alexandru Iamandache (born 14 September 1999) is a Romanian professional footballer who plays as a left winger for Liga I club Universitatea Craiova.

== Honours ==
Afumați

- Liga III: 2022–23, 2023–24
