= Steven Nsimba =

French footballer (born 1996)

- Nsimba with Universitatea Craiova in 2025

Personal information
- Full name: Aimé-Steven Nsasa Nsimba Labe
- Date of birth: 31 May 1996 (age 30)
- Place of birth: Ivry-sur-Seine, France
- Height: 1.83 m (6 ft 0 in)
- Position: Striker

Team information
- Current team: Universitatea Craiova
- Number: 7

Youth career
- –2017: US Villejuif

Senior career*
Years	Team	Apps	(Gls)
2017–2018	Gobelins	22	(4)
2018	Bobigny	3	(0)
2019–2020	Les Ulis	34	(14)
2020–2021	Bourges 18	0	(0)
2021–2022	Bourges	30	(16)
2022–2023	Laval	7	(0)
2022–2023	Laval B	4	(1)
2023–2024	Avranches	31	(3)
2024–2025	Aubagne	32	(12)
2025–	Universitatea Craiova	44	(14)
- * Club domestic league appearances and goals as of 1 November 2026

Aimé-Steven Nsasa Nsimba Labe (born 31 May 1996) is a French professional footballer who plays as a striker for Liga I club Universitatea Craiova.

== Career ==
Nsimba began his senior career with Gobelins in 2017, and shortly after moved to Bobigny where he had a stint. He transferred to Les Ulis in 2021, where he played for 2 1/2 seasons. He spent the 2021–22 season with Bourges, where he was one of the top scorers with 16 goals in 30 games. Nsimba moved to Universitatea Craiova in the 2025/26 season where he is now one of the best players in Superliga, and scored one goal in the Uefa Europa Conference League against Sparta Prague.

== Personal life ==
Steven Nsimba was born in Ivry-sur-Seine, in the southeastern suburbs of Paris. He holds French and Congolese nationalities.

== Career statistics ==
=== Club ===
As of match played 1 November 2026

Appearances and goals by club, season and competition
Club	Season	League			National cup (Note: Includes Coupe de France, Cupa României)		Europe		Other		Total	
Club	Season	Division	Apps	Goals	Apps	Goals	Apps	Goals	Apps	Goals	Apps	Goals
Gobelins	2017–18	Championnat National 3	22	4	0	0	—		—		22	4
Bobigny	2018–19	Championnat National 2	3	0	0	0	—		—		3	0
Les Ulis	2018–19	Championnat National 3	13	4	0	0	—		—		13	4
Les Ulis	2019–20	Championnat National 3	17	10	0	0	—		—		17	10
Les Ulis	2020–21	Championnat National 3	4	0	0	0	—		—		4	2
Les Ulis	Total		34	14	0	0	—		—		34	14
Bourges 18	2020–21	Championnat National 2	0	0	1	0	—		—		1	0
Bourges	2021–22	Championnat National 2	30	16	0	0	—		—		30	16
Laval	2022–23	Ligue 2	7	0	0	0	—		—		7	0
Laval B	2022–23	Championnat National 3	4	1	—		—		—		4	1
Avranches	2023–24	Championnat National	31	3	2	1	—		—		33	4
Aubagne	2024–25	Championnat National	32	12	1	0	—		—		33	12
Universitatea Craiova	2025–26	Liga I	34	10	3	0	9 (Note: Appearances in UEFA Conference League)	3	—		46	13
Universitatea Craiova	2026–27	Liga I	10	4	2	1	7 (Note: Three appearances and one goal in UEFA Champions League, four appearances and one goal in UEFA Europa League)	2	1 (Note: Appearance in Supercupa României)	1	20	8
Universitatea Craiova	Total		44	14	5	1	16	5	1	1	66	21
Career total			207	64	9	2	16	5	1	1	233	72

== Honours ==
- Liga I: 2025–26
- Cupa României: 2025–26
- Supercupa Românieiː 2026
