= Monday Etim =

Nigerian footballer

Personal information
- Full name: Monday Bassey Etim
- Date of birth: 4 December 1998 (age 27)
- Place of birth: Calabar, Nigeria
- Height: 1.76 m (5 ft 9 in)
- Position: Forward

Team information
- Current team: Universitatea Craiova
- Number: 12

Youth career
- Kadji Sports Academy
- –2015: Montverde Academy

Senior career*
Years	Team	Apps	(Gls)
2017	Los Angeles FC	0	(0)
2017	→ Orange County SC (loan)	16	(2)
2018	Rio Grande Valley	11	(0)
2019–2023	Roskilde	97	(39)
2023–2024	Helsingør	29	(2)
2024–2025	Hillerød	36	(13)
2025–	Universitatea Craiova	36	(6)
- * Club domestic league appearances and goals as of 19 September 2026

Monday Bassey Etim (born 4 December 1998) is a Nigerian professional footballer who plays as a forward for Liga I club Universitatea Craiova.

== Career ==
After spending time in the Kadji Sports Academy in Cameroon, Etim moved to Florida to join the Montverde Academy. He became the second ever signing for new Major League Soccer franchise Los Angeles FC in April 2017, and was immediately loaned to their United Soccer League affiliate Orange County SC.

On 15 July 2019, Etim signed a two-year contract with Danish 1st Division club FC Roskilde after two weeks trial. After four years at Roskilde, Etim joined FC Helsingør in June 2023, signing a two-year deal.

On 17 July 2024, after the 2023–24 season ended in relegation for Helsingør, the Danish 1st Division club Hillerød Fodbold confirmed that they had signed Etim on a contract until June 2026.

On transfer deadline day, 1 September 2025, Etim transferred to the Romanian Liga I club Universitatea Craiova. The club did not disclose the duration of the contract.

== Career statistics ==
=== Club ===
As of match played 19 September 2026

Appearances and goals by club, season and competition
Club	Season	League			National cup (Note: Includes U.S. Open Cup, Danish Cup, Cupa României)		Continental		Other		Total	
Club	Season	Division	Apps	Goals	Apps	Goals	Apps	Goals	Apps	Goals	Apps	Goals
Orange County SC (loan)	2017	USL Championship	16	2	2	0	—		—		18	2
Rio Grande Valley	2018	USL Championship	11	0	0	0	—		—		11	0
Roskilde	2019–20	Danish 1st Division	20	3	1	0	—		—		21	3
Roskilde	2020–21	Danish 2nd Division	23	6	1	0	—		—		24	6
Roskilde	2021–22	Danish 3rd Division	28	22	2	1	—		—		30	23
Roskilde	2022–23	Danish 2nd Division	26	8	3	1	—		—		29	9
Roskilde	Total		97	39	7	2	—		—		104	41
Helsingør	2023–24	Danish 1st Division	29	2	2	0	—		—		31	2
Hillerød	2024–25	Danish 1st Division	28	11	3	1	—		—		31	12
Hillerød	2025–26	Danish 1st Division	8	2	0	0	—		—		8	2
Hillerød	Total		36	13	3	1	—		—		39	14
Universitatea Craiova	2025–26	Liga I	27	4	5	3	4 (Note: Appearances in UEFA Conference League)	1	—		36	8
Universitatea Craiova	2026–27	Liga I	9	2	1	0	8 (Note: Four appearances in UEFA Champions League, four appearances in UEFA Europa League)	0	0	0	18	2
Universitatea Craiova	Total		36	6	6	3	12	1	0	0	54	10
Career total			225	62	20	6	12	1	0	0	257	69

== Honours ==
Roskilde

- Danish 3rd Division: 2021–22

Universitatea Craiova

- Liga I: 2025–26
- Cupa României: 2025–26
- Supercupa Românieiː 2026
