= Laurențiu Popescu =

Romanian footballer (born 1997)

Personal information
- Full name: Iulian Laurențiu Popescu
- Date of birth: 18 January 1997 (age 29)
- Place of birth: Filiași, Romania
- Height: 1.80 m (5 ft 11 in)
- Position: Goalkeeper

Team information
- Current team: Universitatea Craiova
- Number: 21

Youth career
- –2014: Școala de Fotbal Gheorghe Popescu
- 2014–2016: Universitatea Craiova

Senior career*
Years	Team	Apps	(Gls)
2016–	Universitatea Craiova	132	(0)
2017	→ Pandurii Târgu Jiu (loan)	9	(0)
2021	→ Politehnica Iași (loan)	10	(0)
2022	→ FC Brașov (loan)	9	(0)

International career
2013	Romania U16	1	(0)
2015	Romania U18	1	(0)
- * Club domestic league appearances and goals as of 1 November 2026

Iulian Laurențiu Popescu (born 18 January 1997) is a Romanian professional footballer who plays as a goalkeeper for Liga I club Universitatea Craiova.

== Career statistics ==
As of match played 5 November 2026

Appearances and goals by club, season and competition
Club	Season	League			Cupa României		Europe		Other		Total	
Club	Season	Division	Apps	Goals	Apps	Goals	Apps	Goals	Apps	Goals	Apps	Goals
Universitatea Craiova	2015–16	Liga I	7	0	0	0	—		0	0	7	0
Universitatea Craiova	2016–17	Liga I	0	0	0	0	—		0	0	0	0
Universitatea Craiova	2017–18	Liga I	2	0	0	0	0	0	—		2	0
Universitatea Craiova	2018–19	Liga I	0	0	2	0	0	0	0	0	2	0
Universitatea Craiova	2019–20	Liga I	6	0	2	0	0	0	—		8	0
Universitatea Craiova	2020–21	Liga I	0	0	0	0	0	0	—		0	0
Universitatea Craiova	2021–22	Liga I	—		—		—		0	0	0	0
Universitatea Craiova	2022–23	Liga I	17	0	1	0	0	0	—		18	0
Universitatea Craiova	2023–24	Liga I	37	0	1	0	—		1 (Note: Appearance in Liga I European play-offs)	0	39	0
Universitatea Craiova	2024–25	Liga I	37	0	0	0	2 (Note: Appearances in UEFA Conference League)	0	—		39	0
Universitatea Craiova	2025–26	Liga I	18	0	4	0	0	0	—		22	0
Universitatea Craiova	2026–27	Liga I	8	0	0	0	11 (Note: Four appearances in UEFA Champions League, four appearances in UEFA Europa League, three appearances in UEFA Conference League)	0	0	0	19	0
Universitatea Craiova	Total		132	0	10	0	13	0	1	0	156	0
Pandurii Târgu Jiu (loan)	2016–17	Liga I	9	0	—		—		—		9	0
Politehnica Iași (loan)	2021–22	Liga I	10	0	0	0	—		—		10	0
FC Brașov (loan)	2021–22	Liga II	9	0	—		—		2 (Note: Appearances in Liga II relegation play-offs)	0	11	0
Career total			160	0	10	0	13	0	3	0	186	0

== Honours ==
Universitatea Craiova

- Liga I: 2025–26
- Cupa României: 2017–18, 2020–21, 2025–26
- Supercupa României: 2021, 2026
