= Anzor Mekvabishvili =

Georgian footballer (born 2001)

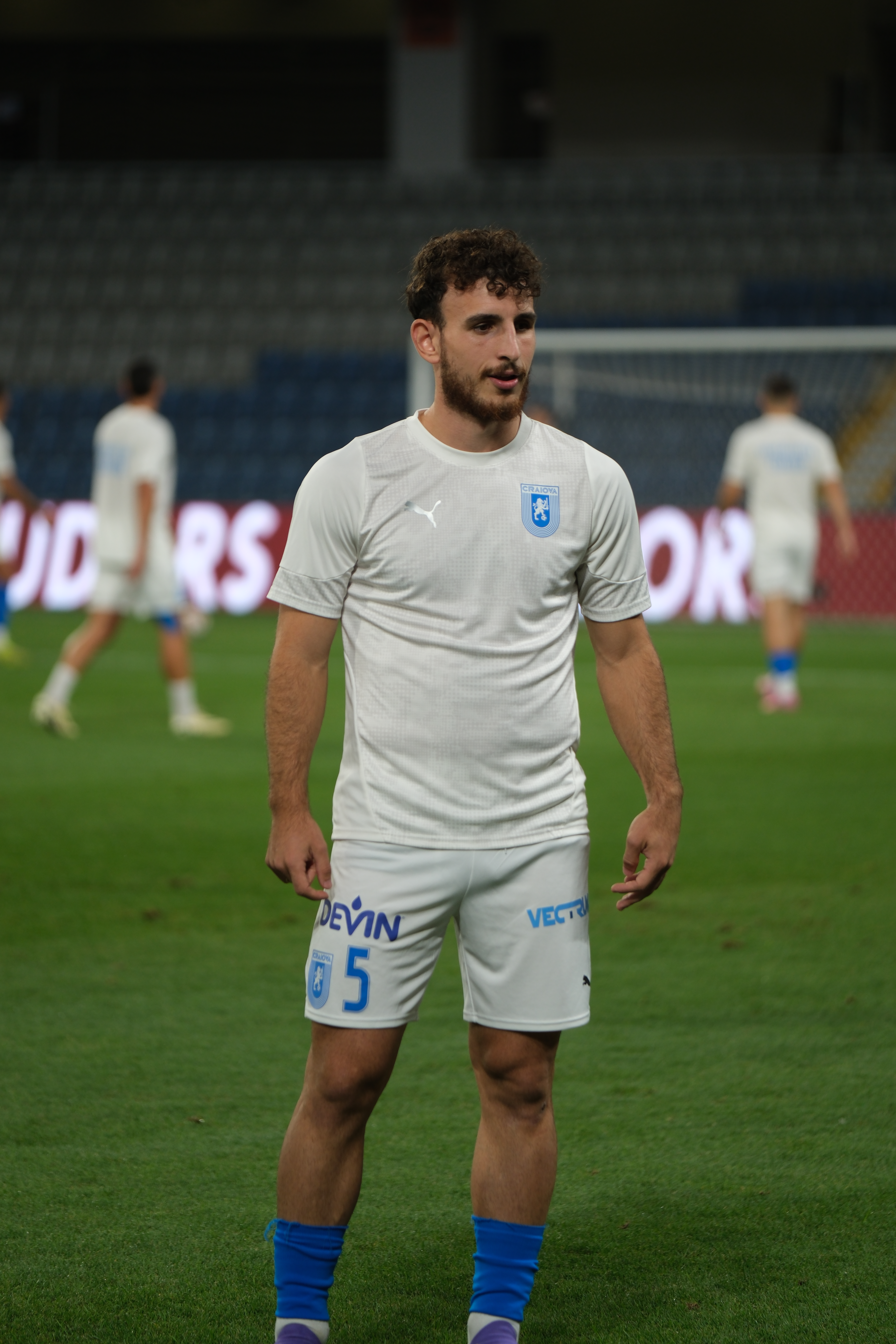
- Mekvabishvili with Universitatea Craiova in 2025

Personal information
- Date of birth: 5 June 2001 (age 25)
- Place of birth: Tbilisi, Georgia
- Height: 1.74 m (5 ft 9 in)
- Position: Midfielder

Team information
- Current team: Chicago Fire
- Number: 23

Youth career
- 2015–2020: Dinamo Tbilisi

Senior career*
Years	Team	Apps	(Gls)
2020–2024	Dinamo Tbilisi	99	(8)
2024–2026	Universitatea Craiova	86	(6)
2026–	Chicago Fire	6	(1)

International career^{‡}
2017	Georgia U16	1	(0)
2016–2018	Georgia U17	27	(1)
2018–2020	Georgia U19	17	(1)
2020–2023	Georgia U21	13	(1)
2022–	Georgia	38	(0)
- * Club domestic league appearances and goals as of 23:14, 17 November 2026 (UTC) ‡ National team caps and goals as of 14 November 2026

Anzor Mekvabishvili (Order of Honor) (Georgian: ანზორ მექვაბიშვილი, romanized: anzor mekvabishvili, pronounced [anzor mekʰʷabiʃʷili]; born 5 June 2001) is a Georgian professional footballer who plays as a midfielder for Major League Soccer club Chicago Fire and the Georgia national team.

== Club career ==
Mekvabishvili was born in Tbilisi, and went on to play for local club Dinamo Tbilisi at the youth level. In 2020, he made his debut for the senior team. During his tenure at the club, he won multiple trophies, including three Erovnuli Ligas in 2019, 2020, and 2022. He also won two Georgian Super Cups.

In January 2024, Mekvabishvili joined Universitatea Craiova. He has since made 119 appearances for the club in all competitions, and has scored 7 goals and collected 14 assists.

== International career ==
Mekvabishvili made his debut for the Georgia national team on 25 March 2022 against Bosnia and Herzegovina. He has since become a frequent starter for the nation. In 2024, Mekvabishvili was selected for Georgia's first international tournament, the UEFA Euro 2024. On 18 June 2024, he started in the nation's match against Turkey, where Georgia lost 3–1.

== Career statistics ==
=== Club ===
As of match played 27 August 2026

Appearances and goals by club, season and competition
Club	Season	League			National cup (Note: Includes Georgian Cup, Cupa României)		Europe		Other		Total	
Club	Season	Division	Apps	Goals	Apps	Goals	Apps	Goals	Apps	Goals	Apps	Goals
Dinamo Tbilisi	2020	Erovnuli Liga	10	0	1	0	0	0	0	0	11	0
Dinamo Tbilisi	2021	Erovnuli Liga	35	1	1	0	3 (Note: One appearance in UEFA Champions League, two appearances in UEFA Conference League)	0	1 (Note: Appearances in Georgian Super Cup)	0	40	1
Dinamo Tbilisi	2022	Erovnuli Liga	31	5	2	0	1 (Note: Appearances in UEFA Conference League)	0	—		34	5
Dinamo Tbilisi	2023	Erovnuli Liga	23	2	2	0	3 (Note: One appearance in UEFA Champions League, two appearances in UEFA Conference League)	0	0	0	28	2
Dinamo Tbilisi	Total		99	8	6	0	7	0	1	0	113	8
Universitatea Craiova	2023–24	Liga I	18	0	1	0	—		1 (Note: Appearance in Liga I European play-offs)	0	20	0
Universitatea Craiova	2024–25	Liga I	29	3	3	0	2	0	—		34	3
Universitatea Craiova	2025–26	Liga I	33	3	6	1	11	0	—		50	4
Universitatea Craiova	2026–27	Liga I	6	0	—		8 (Note: Four appearances in UEFA Champions League, four appearances in UEFA Europa League)	0	1 (Note: Appearance in Supercupa României)	0	15	0
Universitatea Craiova	Total		86	6	10	1	21	0	2	0	119	7
Chicago Fire	2026	MLS	0	0	—		—		—		0	0
Career total			185	14	16	1	28	0	3	0	232	15

=== International ===
As of match played 14 November 2026

Appearances and goals by national team and year
National team	Year	Apps	Goals
Georgia	2022	7	0
Georgia	2023	6	0
Georgia	2024	6	0
Georgia	2025	10	0
Georgia	2026	9	0
Total		38	0

== Honours ==
Dinamo Tbilisi

- Erovnuli Liga: 2020, 2022
- Georgian Super Cup: 2021, 2023

Universitatea Craiova

- Liga I: 2025–26
- Cupa României: 2025–26
- Supercupa Românieiː 2026

Individual

- Liga I Team of the Season: 2025–26
