= Luca Băsceanu =

Romanian footballer (born 2006)

- Băsceanu with Universitatea Craiova in 2025

Personal information
- Full name: Luca Constantin Băsceanu
- Date of birth: 17 May 2006 (age 20)
- Place of birth: Constanța, Romania
- Height: 1.75 m (5 ft 9 in)
- Positions: Winger; attacking midfielder

Team information
- Current team: Universitatea Craiova
- Number: 29

Youth career
- 2012–2024: Gheorghe Hagi Academy

Senior career*
Years	Team	Apps	(Gls)
2024–2025	Farul Constanța	13	(2)
2025–	Universitatea Craiova	33	(2)

International career^{‡}
2021–2022	Romania U16	7	(0)
2022–2023	Romania U17	7	(1)
2023	Romania U18	4	(1)
2024–2025	Romania U19	6	(1)
2025–	Romania U20	4	(2)
2026–	Romania U21	1	(0)
- * Club domestic league appearances and goals as of 18 October 2026 ‡ National team caps and goals as of 13 November 2026

Luca Constantin Băsceanu (born 17 May 2006) is a Romanian professional footballer who plays as a winger or an attacking midfielder for Liga I club Universitatea Craiova.

== Club career ==
=== Farul Constanța ===
Băsceanu came through the ranks of the Gheorghe Hagi Academy, which he joined in 2012 at the age of six. He made his senior debut for Farul Constanța on 2 November 2023, appearing as a substitute in a 0–1 Cupa României group stage defeat to Gloria Buzău.

Băsceanu played his first Liga I match on 21 October 2024, coming off the bench in a 0–5 away loss to Rapid București. He scored his first league goal on 29 March 2025, in a 3–4 away defeat to Botoșani.

=== Universitatea Craiova ===
On 20 May 2025, Universitatea Craiova reportedly reached an agreement to sign Băsceanu for a transfer fee of €1 million plus 20% interest. The move was officially announced on 1 July.

Băsceanu made his debut for Craiova on 3 August 2025, starting in a 3–2 away victory over CFR Cluj in the Liga I.

== International career ==
Băsceanu has represented the Romania national team at under-16, under-17, under-18, and under-19 levels.

== Player profile ==
=== Style of play ===
Băsceanu is a versatile attacking player, primarily operating as a winger or an attacking midfielder.

=== Reception ===
Following a Liga I appearance in March 2025, former Romanian international Ilie Dumitrescu praised Băsceanu for his impact off the bench, noting that he "added pace", "created imbalance", and showed "the traits of a top-level footballer". Dumitrescu also commended the youngster's interpretation of play and his courage to take initiative at only 18 years old.

During that same period, Adrian Mutu described Băsceanu as one of the most promising Romanian talents in recent years and expressed confidence in his potential to become a leading footballer.

== Career statistics ==
As of 29 October 2026

Appearances and goals by club, season and competition
Club	Season	League			Cupa României		Europe		Other		Total	
Club	Season	Division	Apps	Goals	Apps	Goals	Apps	Goals	Apps	Goals	Apps	Goals
Farul Constanța	2024–25	Liga I	13	2	2	0	—		—		15	2
Universitatea Craiova	2025–26	Liga I	22	2	5	0	2 (Note: Appearances in UEFA Conference League)	0	—		29	2
Universitatea Craiova	2026–27	Liga I	11	0	2	0	3 (Note: One Appearance in UEFA Europa League, two appearances in UEFA Conference League)	0	0	0	16	0
Universitatea Craiova	Total		33	2	7	0	5	0	0	0	45	2
Career total			46	4	9	0	5	0	0	0	60	4

== Honours ==
Universitatea Craiova

- Liga I: 2025–26
- Cupa României: 2025–26
- Supercupa României: 2026
