= David Matei =

Romanian footballer (born 2006)

- Matei with Universitatea Craiova in 2025

Personal information
- Full name: David Matei
- Date of birth: 19 July 2006 (age 20)
- Place of birth: Bucharest, Romania
- Height: 1.72 m (5 ft 8 in)
- Position: Midfielder

Team information
- Current team: Universitatea Craiova
- Number: 30

Youth career
- 2012–2016: CSȘ 2 București
- 2016–2020: Dinamo București
- 2020–2022: CSA Steaua București

Senior career*
Years	Team	Apps	(Gls)
2023–2025	CSA Steaua București	52	(5)
2025–	Universitatea Craiova	44	(5)

International career^{‡}
2023	Romania U17	2	(0)
2023–2024	Romania U18	5	(0)
2024–2025	Romania U19	12	(0)
2025–	Romania U20	3	(0)
2025–	Romania U21	3	(0)
2026–	Romania	3	(0)
- * Club domestic league appearances and goals as of 1 November 2026 ‡ National team caps and goals as of 13 November 2026

David Matei (born 19 July 2006) is a Romanian professional footballer who plays as a midfielder for Liga I club Universitatea Craiova and the Romania national team.

== Career statistics ==
=== Club ===
As of 5 November 2026

Appearances and goals by club, season and competition
Club	Season	League			Cupa României		Europe		Other		Total	
Club	Season	Division	Apps	Goals	Apps	Goals	Apps	Goals	Apps	Goals	Apps	Goals
CSA Steaua București	2022–23	Liga II	7	1	0	0	—		—		7	1
CSA Steaua București	2023–24	Liga II	17	1	3	1	—		—		20	2
CSA Steaua București	2024–25	Liga II	28	3	1	0	—		—		29	3
CSA Steaua București	Total		52	5	4	1	—		—		56	6
Universitatea Craiova	2025–26	Liga I	31	4	5	1	0	0	—		36	5
Universitatea Craiova	2026–27	Liga I	13	1	1	0	7 (Note: One appearance in UEFA Champions League, three appearances in UEFA Europa League, three appearances in UEFA Conference League)	0	1 (Note: Appearance in Supercupa României)	0	22	1
Universitatea Craiova	Total		44	5	6	1	7	0	1	0	58	6
Career total			96	10	10	2	7	0	1	0	114	12

=== International ===
As of match played 28 September 2026

Appearances and goals by national team and year
National team	Year	Apps	Goals
Romania
Romania	2026	3	0
Total		3	0

== Honours ==
Universitatea Craiova

- Liga I: 2025–26
- Cupa României: 2025–26
- Supercupa României: 2026
