= Samuel Teles =

Portuguese footballer

- Teles with Universitatea Craiova in 2025

Personal information
- Full name: Samuel Teles Pereira Nunes da Silva
- Date of birth: 28 February 1997 (age 29)
- Place of birth: Espinho, Portugal
- Height: 1.80 m (5 ft 11 in)
- Position: Central midfielder

Team information
- Current team: Universitatea Craiova
- Number: 23

Youth career
- –2010: Anta
- 2010–2015: Sanjoanense
- 2015–2016: Braga

Senior career*
Years	Team	Apps	(Gls)
2014–2015	Sanjoanense	7	(0)
2016–2018	Sanjoanense	27	(0)
2017	→ Lusitânia (loan)	5	(0)
2018–2020	Leça	50	(3)
2020–2023	Feirense	60	(3)
2020–2021	→ Leça (loan)	17	(3)
2023–2025	Oțelul Galați	70	(7)
2025–	Universitatea Craiova	41	(3)
- * Club domestic league appearances and goals as of 18 October 2026

Samuel Teles Pereira Nunes da Silva (born 28 February 1997), known as Samuel Teles, is a Portuguese professional footballer who plays as a central midfielder for Liga I club Universitatea Craiova.

== Career ==
On 2 July 2023, free agent Teles joined Oțelul. Teles rose to prominence during the 2023–24 season, establishing himself as a vital member of the Oțelul squad. He featured in the majority of the team's matches throughout the season, playing a key role in their impressive run to the Cupa României final.

== Career statistics ==
=== Club ===
As of match played 5 November 2026

Appearances and goals by club, season and competition
Club	Season	League			National cup (Note: Includes Taça de Portugal, Cupa României)		Europe		Other		Total	
Club	Season	Division	Apps	Goals	Apps	Goals	Apps	Goals	Apps	Goals	Apps	Goals
Sanjoanense	2014–15	Campeonato Nacional de Seniores	7	0	0	0	—		—		7	0
Sanjoanense	2016–17	Campeonato de Portugal	1	0	0	0	—		—		1	0
Sanjoanense	2017–18	Campeonato de Portugal	26	0	3	2	—		—		29	2
Sanjoanense	Total		27	0	3	2	—		—		30	2
Lusitânia (loan)	2016–17	AF Aveiro 1ª Divisão	6	0	—		—		—		6	0
Leça	2018–19	Campeonato de Portugal	28	2	1	0	—		—		29	2
Leça	2019–20	Campeonato de Portugal	22	1	3	0	—		—		25	1
Leça	Total		50	3	4	0	—		—		54	3
Leça (loan)	2020–21	Campeonato de Portugal	17	3	0	0	—		—		17	3
Feirense	2021–22	Liga Portugal 2	30	2	1	0	—		1 (Note: Appearances in Taça da Liga)	0	32	2
Feirense	2022–23	Liga Portugal 2	30	1	1	0	—		4	1	35	2
Feirense	Total		60	3	2	0	—		5	1	67	4
Oțelul Galați	2023–24	Liga I	34	3	5	1	—		1 (Note: Appearance in Liga I European play-offs)	0	40	4
Oțelul Galați	2024–25	Liga I	36	4	3	0	—		—		39	4
Oțelul Galați	Total		70	7	8	1	—		1	0	79	8
Universitatea Craiova	2025–26	Liga I	32	2	5	0	12 (Note: Appearances in UEFA Conference League)	0	—		49	2
Universitatea Craiova	2026–27	Liga I	9	1	2	0	10 (Note: Four appearances in UEFA Champions League, four appearances in UEFA Europa League, three appearances in UEFA Conference League)	0	0	0	22	1
Universitatea Craiova	Total		41	3	7	0	23	0	0	0	71	3
Career total			278	19	24	3	23	0	6	1	331	23

== Honours ==
Oțelul Galați

- Cupa României runner-up: 2023–24

Universitatea Craiova

- Liga I: 2025–26
- Cupa României: 2025–26
- Supercupa României: 2026
