= Alexandru Crețu =

Romanian footballer (born 1992)

- Crețu with Universitatea Craiova in 2025

Personal information
- Date of birth: 24 April 1992 (age 34)
- Place of birth: Pașcani, Romania
- Height: 1.90 m (6 ft 3 in)
- Positions: Defensive midfielder; centre-back

Team information
- Current team: Universitatea Craiova
- Number: 4

Youth career
- CFR Pașcani
- LPS Iași
- –2010: Politehnica Iași

Senior career*
Years	Team	Apps	(Gls)
2010–2016	CSMS Iași	152	(7)
2011	→ FC Hunedoara (loan)		
2017–2018	Olimpija Ljubljana	19	(1)
2018–2021	Maribor	77	(3)
2021	FCSB	5	(0)
2021–2024	Universitatea Craiova	106	(16)
2024–2025	Al-Wehda	32	(1)
2025–	Universitatea Craiova	27	(1)

International career^{‡}
2012–2014	Romania U21	11	(0)
2020–2022	Romania	7	(0)
- * Club domestic league appearances and goals as of 11 October 2026 ‡ National team caps and goals as of 11 June 2022

Alexandru Crețu (Romanian pronunciation: [alekˈsandru ˈkret͡su]; born 24 April 1992) is a Romanian professional footballer who plays as a defensive midfielder or a centre-back for Liga I club Universitatea Craiova.

== Club career ==
Crețu came into prominence during the 2012–13 Liga I season, following his good performances as a central defender at CSMS Iași.

In December 2016, he signed a three-and-a-half-year contract with Slovenian team Olimpija Ljubljana. In February 2018, Crețu moved to domestic rivals Maribor with which he agreed to a three-and-a-half-year deal.

In the summer of 2021, he returned to Romania to sign for FCSB as a free agent. He however left the club before the end of August after falling out with owner George Becali.

== International career ==
Crețu was a member of the Romania under-21 youth team. On 4 September 2020, he debuted for the senior team in a 1–1 draw against Northern Ireland in the 2020–21 UEFA Nations League.

== Career statistics ==
=== Club ===
As of match played 29 October 2026

Appearances and goals by club, season and competition
Club	Season	League			National cup (Note: Includes Cupa României, Slovenian Cup, King's Cup)		Continental		Other		Total	
Club	Season	Division	Apps	Goals	Apps	Goals	Apps	Goals	Apps	Goals	Apps	Goals
CSMS Iași	2010–11	Liga II	16	1	0	0	–		–		16	1
CSMS Iași	2011–12	Liga II	8	0	–		–		–		8	0
CSMS Iași	2012–13	Liga I	26	0	1	0	–		–		27	0
CSMS Iași	2013–14	Liga II	29	3	1	0	–		–		4	0
CSMS Iași	2014–15	Liga I	28	3	1	0	–		3 (Note: Appearances in Cupa Ligii)	1	32	4
CSMS Iași	2015–16	Liga I	34	0	3	0	–		1	0	38	0
CSMS Iași	2016–17	Liga I	11	0	2	0	1 (Note: Appearances in UEFA Europa League)	0	0	0	14	0
CSMS Iași	Total		152	7	8	0	1	0	4	1	165	8
FC Hunedoara (loan)	2011–12	Liga III	?	?	?	?	–		–		?	?
Olimpija Ljubljana	2016–17	Slovenian PrvaLiga	14	1	3	1	–		–		17	2
Olimpija Ljubljana	2017–18	Slovenian PrvaLiga	5	0	1	0	2	0	–		8	0
Olimpija Ljubljana	Total		19	1	4	1	2	0	–		25	2
Maribor	2017–18	Slovenian PrvaLiga	6	0	–		–		–		6	0
Maribor	2018–19	Slovenian PrvaLiga	23	0	5	1	2	0	–		30	1
Maribor	2019–20	Slovenian PrvaLiga	27	1	1	0	7 (Note: Five appearances and one goal in UEFA Champions League, two appearances in UEFA Europa League)	1	–		35	2
Maribor	2020–21	Slovenian PrvaLiga	21	2	2	0	1	0	–		24	2
Maribor	Total		77	3	8	1	10	1	–		95	5
FCSB	2021–22	Liga I	5	0	–		2 (Note: Appearances in UEFA Conference League)	0	–		7	0
Universitatea Craiova	2021–22	Liga I	27	3	4	0	–		1 (Note: Appearances in Liga I European play-offs)	0	32	3
Universitatea Craiova	2022–23	Liga I	34	7	0	0	6	0	–		40	7
Universitatea Craiova	2023–24	Liga I	40	6	3	0	–		1	0	44	6
Universitatea Craiova	2024–25	Liga I	5	0	–		2	0	–		7	0
Universitatea Craiova	Total		106	16	7	0	8	0	2	0	123	16
Al-Wehda	2024–25	Saudi Pro League	32	1	2	0	–		–		34	1
Universitatea Craiova	2025–26	Liga I	20	1	6	2	11	0	–		37	3
Universitatea Craiova	2026–27	Liga I	7	0	2	0	2 (Note: One appearance in UEFA Champions League, one appearance in UEFA Conference League)	0	0	0	11	0
Universitatea Craiova	Total		27	1	8	2	13	0	0	0	48	3
Career total			418	29	37	4	36	1	6	1	497	35

=== International ===
As of 11 June 2022

Appearances and goals by national team and year
National team	Year	Apps	Goals
Romania	2020	4	0
Romania	2021	1	0
Romania	2022	2	0
Total		7	0

== Honours ==
CSMS Iași

- Liga II: 2011–12, 2013–14

Maribor

- Slovenian PrvaLiga: 2018–19

Universitatea Craiova

- Liga I: 2025–26
- Cupa României: 2025–26
- Supercupa Românieiː 2026
