= Nikola Stevanović =

Serbian boxer

Nikola Stevanović Никола Стевановић
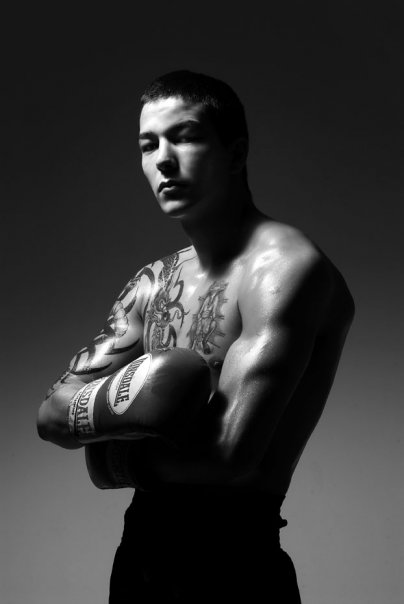

Personal information
- Nicknames: Johnny (Џони, Džoni)
- Nationality: Serbian
- Born: May 21, 1987 (age 39) Belgrade, SR Serbia, Yugoslavia
- Height: 6 ft 0 in (183 cm)
- Weight: Light Middleweight

Boxing career
- Stance: Orthodox

Boxing record
- Total fights: 27
- Wins: 25
- Win by KO: 8
- Losses: 1
- Draws: 1

Nikola Stevanović (Serbian Cyrillic: Никола Стевановић; born 21 May 1987, in Belgrade) is a Serbian former professional boxer and a former IBF Intercontinental light middleweight champion.

== Professional career ==
Stevanovic started boxing at age 11. He trained at the boxing club Cukaricki, and then at Partizan with his brother Stefan.

He made his professional debut as a 17-year-old on October 5, 2004 in Belgrade. He defeated Catalin Andrei Tilimpe via a first-round knockout. At 20 years old, Stevanovic defeated Belgian Cedric Charlier on October 5, 2007, and became the IBF World Junior Champion. He successfully defended his title against Georgia's Alexander Benidze on April 19, 2008. In June 2009, he won the vacant IBF International Title after defeating Francesco di Fiore, and in October 2009, he won the Intercontinental IBF Title by beating Tshepo Mashego. On January 24, 2009, Stevanovic lost to Alexander Abraham for the EBU-EE (European External European Union) Light Middleweight Title at the Erdgas Arena, Germany.

Nikola Stevanovic has been honoured with Fight of the Year three times: in 2009 against Tshepo Mashego; in 2011 against Stefano Castellucci; and in 2012 against Ayoub Nefzi. He received an award for the best Serbian boxer from 2004 to 2014.

In November 2012, he was arrested in Greece on suspicion of having participated in an armed robbery in Athens, along with his brother Stefan, as well as another professional boxer named Petar Bajić. Despite having been released and claiming to be preparing for more fights, his career stalled for nine years following the arrest.

On July 10, 2021, Nikola returned to the ring by participating in a boxing show in Lebane called "Svome gradu," defeating Belarusian journeyman Ilya Kharlamau by a 6-round UD. He had one more fight in Lebane on July 16, 2022, defeating Georgian journeyman Nikolozi Gviniashvili, also by a 6-round UD. He has not fought since.

== Professional boxing record ==
27 fights	25 wins	1 loss
By knockout	8	0
By decision	17	1
Draws	1	

No.	Result	Record	Opponent	Type	Round, time	Date	Location	Notes
27	Win	25–1-1	(Georgia (country)) Nikolozi Gviniashvili	UD	6	2022-07-16	Square, Lebane, Serbia	
26	Win	24–1–1	(Belarus) Ilya Kharlamau	UD	6	2021-07-10	Square, Lebane, Serbia	
25	Win	23–1–1	(Belgium) Ayoub Nefzi	UD	12	2012-05-18	Hall of Sports, Belgrade, Serbia	Retained IBF Inter-Continental light middleweight title.
24	Win	22–1–1	(Italy) Stefano Castellucci	TKO	11 (12), 1:45	2011-05-20	Sport Hall Sumice, Belgrade, Serbia	Retained IBF Inter-Continental light middleweight title.
23	Win	21–1–1	(South Africa) Chris van Heerden	SD	12	2010-05-29	Sport Hall Pinki, Belgrade, Serbia	Retained IBF Inter-Continental light middleweight title.
22	Win	20–1–1	(Croatia) Marjan Markovic	PTS	8	2010-04-03	Sport Hall Pinki, Belgrade, Serbia	
21	Win	19–1–1	(South Africa) Tshepo Mashego	UD	12	2009-10-05	Sport Hall Banjica, Belgrade, Serbia	Won IBF Inter-Continental light middleweight title.
20	Win	18–1–1	(Italy) Francesco Di Fiore	UD	12	2009-06-20	Sport Hall Pinki, Belgrade, Serbia	Won vacant IBF International light middleweight title.
19	Win	17–1–1	(Poland) Mariusz Biskupski	TKO	6 (8), 1:20	2009-03-28	Sport Hall Pinki, Belgrade, Serbia	
18	Loss	16–1–1	(Armenia) Alexander Abraham	UD	12	2009-01-24	Erdgas Arena, Riesa, Germany	For EBU-EE (European External European Union) super welterweight title.
17	Win	16–0–1	(Croatia) Nikola Matic	TKO	4(6), 3:00	2008-12-26	Hall Spen, Novi Sad, Serbia	
16	Win	15–0–1	(Slovakia) Joseph Sovijus	KO	5 (6)	2008-06-28	Mirosaljci, Belgrade, Serbia	
15	Win	14–0–1	(Georgia (country)) Alexander Benidze	UD	10	2008-04-19	Sport Hall Banjica, Belgrade, Serbia	Won IBF Youth Middleweight title.
14	Win	13–0–1	(Austria) Thomas Hengstberger	KO	2 (6),1:14	2007-11-30	Lagator Hall, Loznica, Serbia	
13	Win	12–0–1	(Belgium) Cedric Charlier	UD	10	2007-10-05	Hall of Sports, Belgrade, Serbia	Won IBF Youth Light-Middleweight title.
12	Draw	11–0–1	(Italy) Salvatore Annunziata	PTS	10	2007-04-25	Portici, Campania, Italy	IBF Youth Light-Middleweight title.
11	Win	11–0	(Slovakia) Slavomir Merva	TKO	1(6)	2007-03-18	Nachtwerk, Vienna, Austria	
10	Win	10–0	(Bulgaria) Rumen Kostov	PTS	4	2007-02-17	Hall of Sports, Trstenik, Serbia	
9	Win	9–0	(Slovakia) Joseph Sovijus	PTS	4	2006-10-05	Hall of Sports, Trstenik, Serbia	
8	Win	8–0	(Slovakia) Patrik Prokopecz	TKO	5 (6), 2:08	2006-06-04	Hall of Sports Prijepolje, Prijepolje, Serbia	
7	Win	7–0	(Bosnia and Herzegovina) Hamid Semic	PTS	6	2005-11-26	Sporthalle, Steyr, Austria	
6	Win	6–0	(Slovakia) Igor Krbusik	PTS	6	2005-10-05	Hall of Sports, Belgrade, Serbia	
5	Win	5–0	(Czech Republic) Petr Rykala	PTS	6	2005-05-21	Sporthalle, St. Valentin, Austria	
4	Win	4–0	(Slovakia) Jozef Kubovsky	PTS	4	2005-04-10	Hall of Sports, Belgrade, Serbia	
3	Win	3–0	(Bulgaria) Krasimir Dimitrov	PTS	4	2005-01-23	Hall of Sports, Belgrade, Serbia	
2	Win	2–0	(Bulgaria) Stefan Dimitrov	UD	4	2004-11-25	Sky Bar, Belgrade, Serbia	
1	Win	1–0	(Romania) Catalin Tilimpea	KO	1 (4)	2004-10-05	Sky Bar, Belgrade, Serbia	Stevanovic's professional debut.

Awards and achievements
Preceded by Gregorz Proksa	IBF Youth Middleweight Champion; October 05, 2007 – April 19, 2008	Succeeded by Max Bursak
Preceded by Salvatore Anuziatta	IBF Youth Light Middleweight Champion; April 19, 2008 – October 17, 2008	Succeeded by Adriano Cardarello
Preceded by Frank Haroche Horta	IBF International Light Middleweight Champion; June 20, 2009 – June 04, 2010	Succeeded by Moez Fhima
Preceded by Vincent Vuma	IBF Intercontinental Light Middleweight Champion; October 05, 2009 – February 28, 2013	Succeeded by Lenny Bottai
