= 2026 Cupa României final =

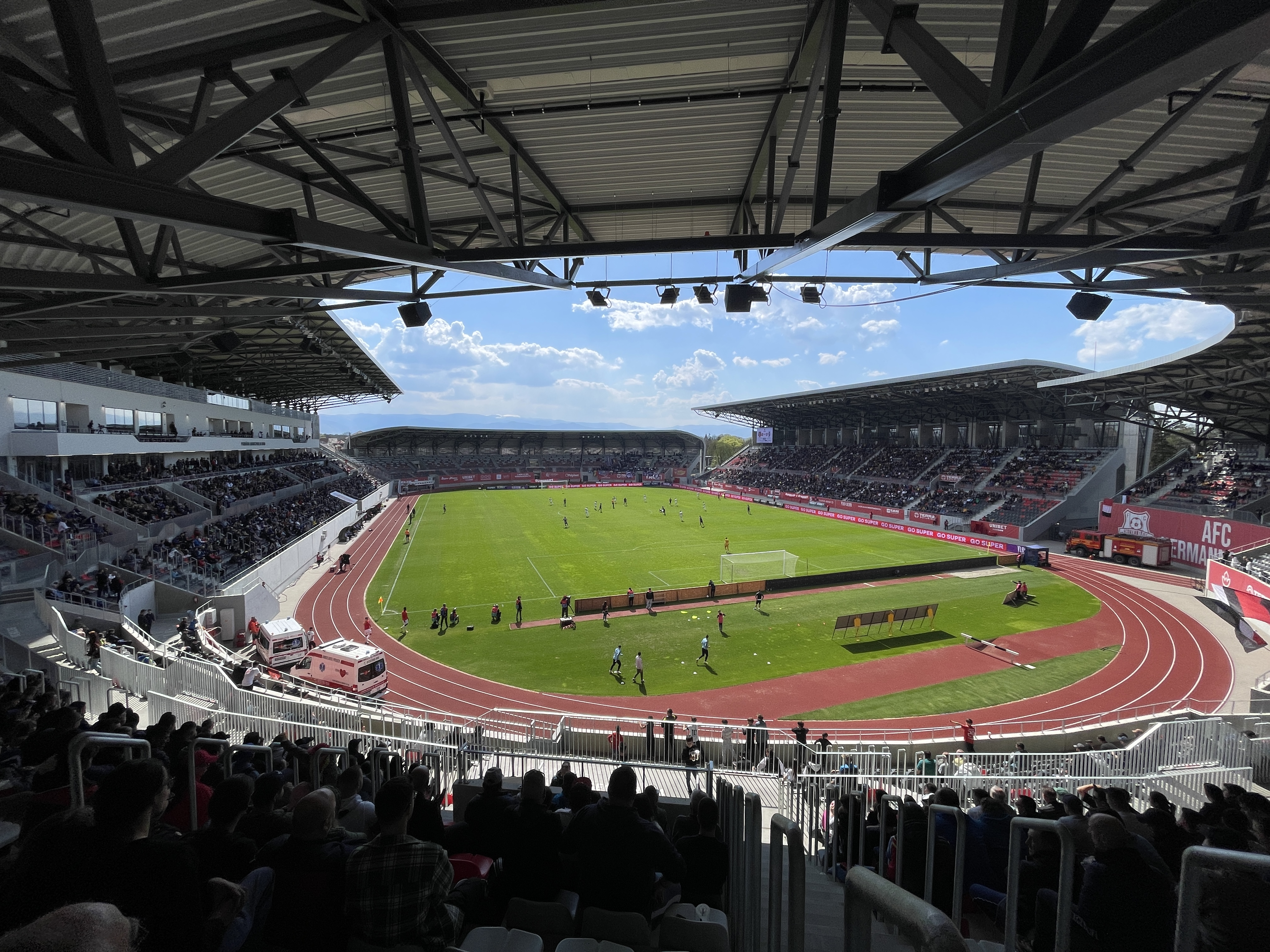
- Municipal Stadium in Sibiu
- Event: 2025–26 Cupa României
Universitatea Cluj	Universitatea Craiova
0	0
- After extra time Universitatea Craiova won 6–5 on penalties
- Date: 13 May 2026
- Venue: Municipal, Sibiu
- Man of the Match: Nicușor Bancu
- Referee: Marian Barbu
- Attendance: 11,736

The 2026 Cupa României final was the final match of the 2025–26 Cupa României and the 88th final of the Cupa României, Romania's main football cup competition. It was played on 13 May 2026 at the Municipal Stadium in Sibiu.

== Match ==
13 May 2026
20:00 EEST (UTC+03)

Universitatea Cluj	0–0 (a.e.t.)	Universitatea Craiova
Penalties
Bic (penalty scored); Lukić (penalty scored); Chipciu (penalty scored); Mendy (penalty scored); Trică (penalty scored); Cristea (penalty missed)	5–6	(penalty scored) Al Hamlawi; (penalty scored) Mora; (penalty scored) Teles; (penalty scored) Romanchuk; (penalty scored) Mekvabishvili; (penalty scored) Crețu

Sibiu Municipal Stadium, Sibiu
Attendance: 11,736
Referee: Marian Barbu

GK	30	(Lithuania) Edvinas Gertmonas
RB	24	(Croatia) Dino Mikanović
CB	6	(Romania) Iulian Cristea
CB	4	(Romania) Andrei Coubiș
LB	27	(Romania) Alexandru Chipciu (c)
CM	7	(The Gambia) Mouhamadou Drammeh
CM	94	(Romania) Ovidiu Bic
RW	19	(Ivory Coast) Issouf Macalou
AM	10	(Romania) Dan Nistor
LW	88	(Romania) Omar El Sawy
CF	17	(Bosnia and Herzegovina) Jovo Lukić
Substitutes:
DF	1	(Romania) Ștefan Lefter
DF	23	(Uganda) Elio Capradossi
DF	28	(Portugal) Miguel Silva
MF	8	(Romania) Dorin Codrea
MF	98	(Romania) Gabriel Simion
FW	9	(Romania) Atanas Trică
FW	29	(France) Oucasse Mendy
FW	33	(Serbia) Jug Stanojev
FW	93	(Moldova) Virgiliu Postolachi
Manager:
(Italy) Cristiano Bergodi

GK	21	(Romania) Laurențiu Popescu
DF	3	(Ukraine) Oleksandr Romanchuk
MF	24	(Serbia) Nikola Stevanović
DF	6	(Romania) Vladimir Screciu
FW	17	(Costa Rica) Carlos Mora
DF	20	(Romania) Alexandru Cicâldău
MF	8	(Romania) Tudor Băluță
MF	11	(Romania) Nicușor Bancu (c)
DF	29	(Romania) Luca Băsceanu
FW	12	(Nigeria) Monday Etim
DF	10	(Romania) Ștefan Baiaram
Substitutes:
FW	32	(Portugal) João Gonçalves
DF	2	(Romania) Florin Ștefan
DF	19	(Romania) Vasile Mogoș
MF	4	(Romania) Alexandru Crețu
MF	5	(Georgia (country)) Anzor Mekvabishvili
MF	18	(Romania) Mihnea Rădulescu
MF	23	(Portugal) Samuel Teles
MF	30	(Romania) David Matei
FW	9	(Palestine) Assad Al Hamlawi
Manager:
(Portugal) Filipe Coelho
