= 2026–27 FC Universitatea Cluj season =

Universitatea Cluj
2026–27 season
- Manager: Cristiano Bergodi
- Stadium: Cluj Arena
- Superliga: Pre-season
- Cupa României: Group Stage
- Supercupa României: Runners-up
- UEFA Europa League: First qualifying round
- UEFA Conference League: Second qualifying round

The 2026–27 season will be the 108th season in the history of Fotbal Club Universitatea Cluj and their fifth consecutive season in the SuperLiga. The club will also compete in the Cupa României, the Supercupa României, and the UEFA Europa League for the first time.

== Current squad ==
As of 16 July 2026

No.	Name	Nationality	Position	Date of birth (age)	Signed from	Signed in	Contract end (Note: Contract ends on 30 June.)
Goalkeepers
1	Ștefan Lefter	(Romania)	GK	18 November 2004 (21)	Corvinul Hunedoara	1 July 2025	Unknown
46	Neofytos Michael	(Cyprus)	GK	16 December 1993 (32)	(Cyprus) Pafos	1 July 2026	Unknown
99	Tudor Coșa	(Romania)	GK	2009 (age 16–17)	Academy	1 July 2026	Unknown
Defenders
2	Alin Chinteș	(Romania)	RB	2006 (age 19–20)	Academy	1 July 2025	Unknown
4	Andrei Coubiș	(Romania)	CB	29 September 2003 (22)	(Italy) Sampdoria	1 January 2026	2029
6	Iulian Cristea	(Romania)	CB	17 July 1994 (32)	Rapid București	1 July 2024	Unknown
22	Florent Poulolo	(France)	CB	2 January 1997 (29)	UTA Arad	1 July 2026	Unknown
23	Elio Capradossi	(Uganda)	CB	11 March 1996 (30)	Free agent	1 September 2025	Unknown
24	Dino Mikanović	(Croatia)	RB	7 May 1994 (32)	(Croatia) Gorica	1 July 2025	Unknown
26	Jonathan Cissé	(Ivory Coast)	CB	18 May 1997 (29)	Free agent	1 July 2025	Unknown
27	Alexandru Chipciu (C)	(Romania)	LB	18 May 1989 (37)	CFR	1 July 2022	Unknown
28	Miguel Silva	(Portugal)	LB	20 December 1995 (30)	Oțelul Galați	1 July 2025	Unknown
Midfielders
7	Mouhamadou Drammeh	(France)	DM	15 May 1999 (27)	(France) Sochaux	1 July 2025	Unknown
8	Dorin Codrea	(Romania)	CM	13 June 1997 (29)	Politehnica Timișoara	1 July 2022	Unknown
10	Dan Nistor	(Romania)	AM	6 May 1988 (38)	Universitatea Craiova	15 February 2023	Unknown
11	Alessandro Murgia	(Italy)	CM	9 August 1996 (30)	(Italy) SPAL	1 July 2025	Unknown
12	Friday Adams	(Nigeria)	RM	4 June 2003 (23)	FC Botoșani	1 July 2026	2029
18	Pedro Pinho	(Portugal)	CM	6 November 1999 (26)	(Portugal) Chaves	1 July 2026	2029
33	Jug Stanojev	(Serbia)	RW	29 July 1999 (27)	(Kazakhstan) Kairat	1 July 2025	Unknown
94	Ovidiu Bic	(Romania)	CM	23 February 1994 (32)	Ironi Kiryat Shmona	1 July 2022	Unknown
98	Gabriel Simion	(Romania)	DM	22 May 1998 (28)	FCSB	1 July 2024	Unknown
Forwards
9	Atanas Trică	(Romania)	ST	9 July 2004 (22)	Universitatea Craiova	1 July 2025	Unknown
14	Marius Ștefănescu	(Romania)	RW	14 August 1998 (27)	(Turkey) Konyaspor	1 July 2026	Unknown
17	Jovo Lukić	(Bosnia and Herzegovina)	ST	28 November 1998 (27)	(Bosnia and Herzegovina) Borac Banja Luka	1 July 2025	Unknown
19	Issouf Macalou	(Ivory Coast)	LW	27 December 1998 (27)	(France) Sochaux	1 July 2025	Unknown
20	Ibuchi Chukwu Goodnews	(Nigeria)	LW	2005 (age 20–21)	Gloria Bistrița	1 July 2026	Unknown
25	Alibek Aliev	(Sweden)	ST	16 August 1996 (29)	CFR	1 July 2026	Unknown
29	Oucasse Mendy	(France)	LW	1 February 2001 (25)	(Belgium) Mons	1 July 2025	Unknown
77	Andrei Gheorghiță	(Romania)	LW	16 July 2002 (24)	FCSB	1 July 2025	Unknown
93	Virgiliu Postolachi	(Moldova)	ST	17 March 2000 (26)	CFR	1 July 2025	Unknown

== Transfers ==
=== In ===
Pos.	Player	Transferred from	Fee	Date	Source
MF	(Romania) Antonio Suciu	(Romania) Ceahlăul Piatra Neamț	Loan return	30 June 2026	
FW	(Sweden) Alibek Aliev	(Romania) CFR Cluj	Free	1 July 2026	
DF	(Nigeria) Friday Adams	(Romania) FC Botoșani	Free	1 July 2026	
MF	(Portugal) Pedro Pinho	(Portugal) Chaves		1 July 2026	
DF	(Martinique) Florent Poulolo	(Romania) UTA Arad		1 July 2026	
MF	(Romania) Marius Ștefănescu	(Turkey) Konyaspor		1 July 2026	
GK	(Cyprus) Neofytos Michail	(Cyprus) Pafos		1 July 2026	
DF	(Romania) Andrei Coubiș	(Italy) Sampdoria	€125,000 (Note: Loan made permanent)	1 July 2026	

=== Out ===
Pos.	Player	Transferred to	Fee	Date	Source
MF	(Romania) Andrei Artean	(Romania) Știința Poli Timișoara	End of contract	1 July 2026	
MF	(Slovakia) Andrej Fábry	(Romania) Corvinul Hunedoara	Free	1 July 2026	
GK	(Lithuania) Edvinas Gertmonas	(Switzerland) Servette	End of contract	1 July 2026	
MF	(Romania) Răzvan Oaidă	(Romania) UTA Arad	Free	1 July 2026	
DF	(Romania) Alin Toșca		End of contract	1 July 2026	
DF	(Switzerland) Jasper van der Werff		End of contract	1 July 2026	
MF	(Romania) Antonio Suciu	(Romania) Gloria Bistrița	Loan	6 July 2026	

== Pre-season and friendlies ==
21 June 2026 Friendly	Croatia U19	2–1	(Romania) Universitatea Cluj	Austria
	6'; 11'	Report	Codrea 80'

22 June 2026 Friendly	Universitatea Cluj (Romania)	v	(Slovenia) Mura	Austria

27 June 2026 Friendly	Újpest (Hungary)	0–0	(Romania) Universitatea Cluj	Austria
18:30

2 July 2026 Friendly	Vojvodina (Serbia)	3–0	(Romania) Universitatea Cluj	Austria
	10' (pen.); 14'; 28'

3 July 2026 Friendly	Universitatea Cluj (Romania)	0–3	(Hungary) Nyíregyháza Spartacus	Austria
11:00			44'; 73'; 80'

== Competitions ==
=== Overall record ===
Competition	First match	Last match	Starting round	Final position	Record							
Competition	First match	Last match	Starting round	Final position	Pld	W	D	L	GF	GA	GD	Win %
Superliga	19 July 2026	May 2027	Matchday 1		0	0	0	0	0	0	+0	—
Cupa României	October 2026		Group Stage		0	0	0	0	0	0	+0	—
Supercupa României	12 July 2026		Final	Runners-up	1	0	1	0	1	1	+0	0.00
UEFA Europa League	9 July 2026	16 July 2026	First qualifying round	First qualifying round	2	0	2	0	0	0	+0	0.00
UEFA Conference League	23 July 2026	30 July 2026	Second qualifying round	Second qualifying round	2	0	1	1	3	5	−2	0.00
Total					5	0	4	1	4	6	−2	0.00

Source: Competitions

=== Superliga ===
Pos	Team	Pld	W	D	L	GF	GA	GD	Pts	Qualification
5	Farul Constanța	4	2	1	1	8	6	+2	7	Advances to Play-off
6	Universitatea Craiova	4	2	0	2	9	6	+3	6	Advances to Play-off
7	Universitatea Cluj	3	2	0	1	4	3	+1	6	Advances to Play-out
8	Petrolul Ploiești	4	2	0	2	2	5	−3	6	Advances to Play-out
9	Corvinul Hunedoara	4	1	2	1	4	3	+1	5	Advances to Play-out

Updated to match(es) played on 10 August 2026. Source: LPF (in Romanian)
Rules for classification: 1) Points; 2) Head-to-head points; 3) Head-to-head goal difference; 4) Head-to-head goals scored; 5) Goal difference; 6) Goals scored; 7) Play-off.

Pos	Team	Pld	W	D	L	GF	GA	GD	Pts	Qualification	1	2	3	4	5	6
1	1	0	0	0	0	0	0	0	0	Qualification to Champions League first qualifying round						
2	2	0	0	0	0	0	0	0	0	Qualification to Conference League second qualifying round						
3	3	0	0	0	0	0	0	0	0	Qualification to European competition play-offs						
4	4	0	0	0	0	0	0	0	0							
5	5	0	0	0	0	0	0	0	0							
6	6	0	0	0	0	0	0	0	0							

Source: LPF (in Romanian)
Rules for classification: 1) Points; 2) Points without rounding; 3) Points in the regular season; 4) Head-to-head points; 5) Head-to-head goal difference; 6) Head-to-head goals scored; 7) Goal difference; 8) Goals scored; 9) Play-off (only if needed to decide champion or teams for UEFA competitions). (Note: only criteria 7 and 8 are applied to establish the classification during the competition.

Pos	Team	Pld	W	D	L	GF	GA	GD	Pts	Qualification or relegation	7	8	9	10	11	12	13	14	15	16
7	7	0	0	0	0	0	0	0	0	Qualification to European competition play-offs										
8	8	0	0	0	0	0	0	0	0	Qualification to European competition play-offs										
9	9	0	0	0	0	0	0	0	0											
10	10	0	0	0	0	0	0	0	0											
11	11	0	0	0	0	0	0	0	0											
12	12	0	0	0	0	0	0	0	0											
13	13	0	0	0	0	0	0	0	0	Qualification to relegation play-offs										
14	14	0	0	0	0	0	0	0	0	Qualification to relegation play-offs										
15	15	0	0	0	0	0	0	0	0	Relegated to Liga II										
16	16	0	0	0	0	0	0	0	0	Relegated to Liga II										

Source: LPF (in Romanian)
Rules for classification: 1) Points; 2) Points without rounding; 3) Points in the regular season; 4) Head-to-head points; 5) Head-to-head goal difference; 6) Head-to-head goals scored; 7) Goal difference; 8) Goals scored; 9) Play-off (only if needed to decide champion or teams for UEFA competitions). (Note: only criteria 7 and 8 are applied to establish the classification during the competition.

==== Results by round ====
Round	1	2	3	4	5	6	7	8	9	10	11	12	13	14	15	16	17	18	19	20	21	22	23	24	25	26	27	28	29	30
Ground	H	A	H	A	H	A	H	A	H	A	H	H	A	H	A	A	H	A	H	A	H	A	H	A	H	A	A	H	A	H
Result	W	L	W																											
Position	5	9	4																											

Updated to match(es) played on 26 July 2026. Source: LPF
A = Away; H = Home; W = Win; D = Draw; L = Loss

=== Matches ===
19 July 2026 1	Universitatea Cluj	2–1	Farul Constanța	Cluj-Napoca
17:00 UTC+3	Aliev 44'; Drammeh 49'; Chinteș (yellow card) 56'	Report	Doicaru 54'; R. Munteanu (yellow card) 44'; Njike (yellow card) 56'; Grigoryan (yellow card) 64'	Stadium: Cluj Arena; Attendance: 4,118; Referee: Szabolcs Kovács

26 July 2026 2	Sepsi OSK	1–0	Universitatea Cluj	Sfântu Gheorghe
17:30 UTC+3	Doru Andrei 22'	Report	Techeres (yellow card) 14'; Cristea (yellow card) 45'; Pinho (yellow card) 54'	Stadium: Sepsi Arena; Attendance: 5,150; Referee: Gabriel Mihuleac

3 August 2026 3	Universitatea Cluj	2–1	FC Botoșani	Sfântu Gheorghe
18:30 UTC+3	Aliev 50' (pen.); Mendy 74'; Codrea (yellow card) 40'; Pinho (yellow card) 71'; Chipciu (yellow card) 90+2'	Report	Dumiter 38'; Papa (yellow card) 29'; Bayeye (yellow card) 55'	Stadium: Sepsi Arena; Attendance: 225; Referee: Marcel Bîrsan

8 August 2026 4	CFR Cluj	v	Universitatea Cluj	Cluj-Napoca
				Stadium: Dr. Constantin Rădulescu

15 August 2026 5	Universitatea Cluj	v	UTA Arad	Cluj-Napoca
				Stadium: Cluj Arena

22 August 2026 6	Dinamo București	v	Universitatea Cluj	Bucharest
				Stadium: Arena Națională

29 August 2026 7	Universitatea Cluj	v	Petrolul Ploiești	Cluj-Napoca
				Stadium: Cluj Arena

5 September 2026 8	Universitatea Craiova	v	Universitatea Cluj	Craiova
				Stadium: Ion Oblemenco

12 September 2026 9	Universitatea Cluj	v	Oțelul Galați	Cluj-Napoca
				Stadium: Cluj Arena

19 September 2026 10	FC Voluntari	v	Universitatea Cluj	Voluntari
				Stadium: Anghel Iordănescu

10 October 2026 11	Universitatea Cluj	v	Rapid București	Cluj-Napoca
				Stadium: Cluj Arena

17 October 2026 12	Universitatea Cluj	v	Argeș Pitești	Cluj-Napoca
				Stadium: Cluj Arena

24 October 2026 13	Corvinul Hunedoara	v	Universitatea Cluj	Arad
				Stadium: Francisc von Neuman

31 October 2026 14	Universitatea Cluj	v	FCSB	Cluj-Napoca
				Stadium: Cluj Arena

7 November 2026 15	Csíkszereda Miercurea Ciuc	v	Universitatea Cluj	Miercurea Ciuc
				Stadium: Municipal

21 November 2026 16	Farul Constanța	v	Universitatea Cluj	Ovidiu
				Stadium: Central

28 November 2026 17	Universitatea Cluj	v	Sepsi OSK	Cluj-Napoca
				Stadium: Cluj Arena

5 December 2026 18	FC Botoșani	v	Universitatea Cluj	Botoșani
				Stadium: Municipal

12 December 2026 19	Universitatea Cluj	v	CFR Cluj	Cluj-Napoca
				Stadium: Cluj Arena

19 December 2026 20	UTA Arad	v	Universitatea Cluj	Arad
				Stadium: Francisc von Neuman

16 January 2027 21	Universitatea Cluj	v	Dinamo București	Cluj-Napoca
				Stadium: Cluj Arena

23 January 2027 22	Petrolul Ploiești	v	Universitatea Cluj	Ploiești
				Stadium: Ilie Oană

30 January 2027 23	Universitatea Cluj	v	Universitatea Craiova	Cluj-Napoca
				Stadium: Cluj Arena

6 February 2027 24	Oțelul Galați	v	Universitatea Cluj	Galați
				Stadium: Oțelul

10 February 2027 25	Universitatea Cluj	v	FC Voluntari	Cluj-Napoca
				Stadium: Cluj Arena

13 February 2027 26	Rapid București	v	Universitatea Cluj	Bucharest
				Stadium: Rapid-Giulești

20 February 2027 27	Argeș Pitești	v	Universitatea Cluj	Mioveni
				Stadium: Orășenesc

27 February 2027 28	Universitatea Cluj	v	Corvinul Hunedoara	Cluj-Napoca
				Stadium: Cluj Arena

6 March 2027 29	FCSB	v	Universitatea Cluj	Bucharest
				Stadium: Arena Națională

13 March 2027 30	Universitatea Cluj	v	Csíkszereda Miercurea Ciuc	Cluj-Napoca
				Stadium: Cluj Arena

=== Supercupa României ===
12 July 2026 Final	Universitatea Craiova	1–1 (a.e.t.) (5–3 p)	Universitatea Cluj	Craiova
20:30	Steven Nsimba 40'		Alibek Aliyev 53'	Stadium: Ion Oblemenco Stadium; Attendance: 14,120; Referee: Iulian Călin (Romania)

=== UEFA Europa League ===
==== First qualifying round ====
9 July 2026 First leg	Dynamo Kyiv (Ukraine)	0–0	(Romania) Universitatea Cluj	Lublin, Poland
19:00		Report		Stadium: Arena Lublin; Attendance: 1,795; Referee: Joonas Jaanovits (Estonia)

16 July 2026 Second leg	Universitatea Cluj (Romania)	0–0 (a.e.t.) (2–4 p)	(Ukraine) Dynamo Kyiv	Cluj-Napoca
20:30		Report		Stadium: Cluj Arena; Attendance: 20,043; Referee: Iwan Arwel Griffith (Wales)
	Penalties
	Nistor (penalty scored); Codrea (penalty missed); Chipciu (penalty missed); Bic (penalty scored)		(penalty scored) Yarmolenko; (penalty scored) Brazhko; (penalty scored) Ponomarenko; (penalty scored) Lonwijk
Note: Dynamo Kyiv won 4–2 on penalties

=== UEFA Conference League ===
==== Second qualifying round ====
23 July 2026 First leg	Universitatea Cluj (Romania)	2–2	(Norway) Brann	Sfântu Gheorghe, Romania
20:00 UTC+3	Jovo Lukić 85'; Pedro Pinho 87'; Marius Ștefănescu (yellow card) 46'; Adams Friday (yellow card) 75'; Alexandru Chipciu (yellow card) 87'	Report	Castro 40'; Horn Myhre 53'; Knudsen (yellow card) 86'; Soltvedt (yellow card) 87'	Stadium: Sepsi Arena; Attendance: 2,821; Referee: Henrik Nalbandyan (Armenia)

30 July 2026 Second leg	Brann (Norway)	3–1 (5–3 agg.)	(Romania) Universitatea Cluj	Bergen, Norway
19:00 UTC+2	Castro 8', 75' Mathisen 45' Castro (yellow card) 32'	Report	Lukić 26'; Mikanović (yellow card) 14'	Stadium: Brann Stadion
