= 2025–26 FC Universitatea Cluj season =

FC Universitatea Cluj seasons

Universitatea Cluj
2025–26 season
- Owners: Cluj-Napoca Municipality; Babeș-Bolyai University; U Cluj Supporters Association
- Chairman: Radu Constantea
- Manager: Ioan Ovidiu Sabău (until 18 October); Cristiano Bergodi (from 23 October)
- Stadium: Cluj Arena
- Liga I: 2nd
- Cupa României: Runners-up
- UEFA Conference League: Second qualifying round
- Top goalscorer: League: Jovo Lukić (16); All: Jovo Lukić (18)
Home colours	Away colours

The 2025–26 season is the 100th season of competitive football of Universitatea Cluj, and the 4th in Liga I, after being promoted at the end of the 2021–22 Liga II season. Universitatea Cluj will compete in the Liga I and in Cupa României.

== Current squad ==
As of 26 January 2026

No.	Name	Nationality	Position	Date of birth (age)	Signed from	Signed in	Contract end (Note: Contract ends on 30 June.)
Goalkeepers
1	Ștefan Lefter	(Romania)	GK	18 November 2004 (21)	Corvinul Hunedoara	1 July 2025	Unknown
30	Edvinas Gertmonas	(Lithuania)	GK	1 June 1996 (30)	(Lithuania) Žalgiris	1 July 2024	Unknown
33	Iustin Chirilă	(Romania)	GK	2006 (age 19–20)	Academy	1 July 2025	Unknown
99	Tudor Coșa	(Romania)	GK	22 March 2009 (17)	Academy	1 July 2025	Unknown
Defenders
2	Alin Chinteș	(Romania)	RB	2006 (age 19–20)	Academy	1 July 2025	Unknown
4	Andrei Coubiș	(Romania)	CB	29 September 2003 (22)	(Italy) Sampdoria	26 January 2026	2026 (Note: On loan from Sampdoria until the end of the season.)
6	Iulian Cristea	(Romania)	CB	17 July 1994 (32)	Rapid București	1 July 2024	Unknown
14	Alin Toșca	(Romania)	CB	14 March 1992 (34)	(Italy) Benevento	1 August 2025	Unknown
16	Jasper van der Werff	(Switzerland)	CB	9 December 1998 (27)	(Germany) SC Paderborn	January 2026	Unknown
24	Dino Mikanović	(Croatia)	RB	7 May 1994 (32)	(Croatia) Gorica	1 August 2025	Unknown
26	Jonathan Cissé	(Ivory Coast)	CB	18 May 1997 (29)	Oțelul Galați	9 June 2025	Unknown
27	Alexandru Chipciu (C)	(Romania)	LB	18 May 1989 (37)	CFR Cluj	1 July 2022	Unknown
28	Miguel Silva	(Portugal)	LB	20 December 1995 (30)	Oțelul Galați	30 June 2025	Unknown
Midfielders
7	Mouhamadou Drammeh	(The Gambia)	DM	15 May 1999 (27)	(France) Sochaux	30 May 2025	Unknown
8	Dorin Codrea	(Romania)	CM	13 June 1997 (29)	Politehnica Timișoara	1 July 2022	Unknown
10	Dan Nistor (VC)	(Romania)	AM	6 May 1988 (38)	Universitatea Craiova	15 February 2023	Unknown
11	Alessandro Murgia	(Italy)	CM	9 August 1996 (30)	FC Hermannstadt	24 June 2025	Unknown
13	Andrej Fábry	(Slovakia)	AM	1 March 1997 (29)	UTA Arad	January 2026	Unknown
20	Alexandru Bota	(Romania)	CM	2008 (age 17–18)	Academy	1 July 2025	Unknown
31	Matei Moraru	(Romania)	AM	9 July 2005 (21)	Academy	1 July 2022	Unknown
77	Andrei Gheorghiță	(Romania)	LW	16 July 2002 (24)	FCSB	20 August 2025	Unknown
80	Alex Orban	(Romania)	CM	2007 (age 18–19)	Academy	1 July 2025	Unknown
88	Omar El Sawy	(Romania)	AM	16 March 2004 (22)	Rapid București	1 July 2025	2026 (Note: On loan from Rapid București until the end of the season.)
94	Ovidiu Bic (3C)	(Romania)	CM	23 February 1994 (32)	(Israel) Ironi Kiryat Shmona	1 July 2022	Unknown
98	Gabriel Simion (4C)	(Romania)	DM	22 May 1998 (28)	FCSB	1 July 2024	Unknown
Forwards
9	Atanas Trică	(Romania)	ST	9 July 2004 (22)	CSM Slatina	30 May 2025	Unknown
17	Jovo Lukić	(Bosnia and Herzegovina)	ST	28 November 1998 (27)	Universitatea Craiova	16 June 2025	Unknown
19	Issouf Macalou	(Ivory Coast)	LW	27 December 1998 (27)	(France) Sochaux	1 July 2024	Unknown
29	Oucasse Mendy	(France)	LW	1 February 2001 (25)	(Belgium) Mons	1 July 2025	Unknown
93	Virgiliu Postolachi	(Moldova)	ST	17 March 2000 (26)	(France) Grenoble	January 2026	Unknown

== Players ==
=== First-team squad ===
As of 26 January 2026

Note: Flags indicate national team as defined under FIFA eligibility rules; some limited exceptions apply. Players may hold more than one non-FIFA nationality.

No.	Pos.	Nation	Player
1	GK	ROU	Ștefan Lefter
2	DF	ROU	Alin Chinteș
4	DF	ROU	Andrei Coubiș (on loan from Sampdoria)
6	DF	ROU	Iulian Cristea
7	MF	GAM	Mouhamadou Drammeh
8	MF	ROU	Dorin Codrea
9	FW	ROU	Atanas Trică
10	MF	ROU	Dan Nistor (Vice-captain)
11	MF	ITA	Alessandro Murgia
13	MF	SVK	Andrej Fábry
14	DF	ROU	Alin Toșca
16	DF	SUI	Jasper van der Werff
17	FW	BIH	Jovo Lukić
19	FW	CIV	Issouf Macalou
20	MF	ROU	Alexandru Bota

No.	Pos.	Nation	Player
24	DF	CRO	Dino Mikanović
26	DF	CIV	Jonathan Cissé
27	MF	ROU	Alexandru Chipciu (Captain)
28	DF	POR	Miguel Silva
29	FW	FRA	Oucasse Mendy
30	GK	LTU	Edvinas Gertmonas
31	MF	ROU	Matei Moraru
33	GK	ROU	Iustin Chirilă
77	MF	ROU	Andrei Gheorghiță
80	MF	ROU	Alex Orban
88	MF	ROU	Omar El Sawy (on loan from Rapid București)
93	FW	MDA	Virgiliu Postolachi
94	MF	ROU	Ovidiu Bic (3rd captain)
98	MF	ROU	Gabriel Simion (4th captain)
99	GK	ROU	Tudor Coșa

== Transfers ==
=== In ===
Pos.	Player	Transferred from	Fee	Date	Source
FW	(Romania) Atanas Trică	(Romania) CSM Slatina	Free	30 May 2025	
MF	(The Gambia) Mouhamadou Drammeh	(France) FC Sochaux-Montbéliard	Free	30 May 2025	
DF	(Ivory Coast) Jonathan Cissé	(Romania) Oțelul Galați	Free	9 June 2025	
FW	(Bosnia and Herzegovina) Jovo Lukić	(Romania) Universitatea Craiova	Free	16 June 2025	
DF	(Romania) Ioan Barstan	(Romania) CFR	Free	23 June 2025	
MF	(Italy) Alessandro Murgia	(Romania) FC Hermannstadt	Free	24 June 2025	
DF	(Portugal) Miguel Silva	(Romania) Oțelul Galați	Free	30 June 2025	
DF	(Uganda) Elio Capradossi	(Italy) AS Cittadella	Free	3 July 2025	
DF	(Romania) Alin Toșca	(Italy) Benevento	Free	1 August 2025	
DF	(Croatia) Dino Mikanović	(Croatia) HNK Gorica	Free	1 August 2025	
FW	(Romania) Andrei Gheorghiță	(Romania) FCSB	Free	20 August 2025	
DF	(Germany) Tobias Horn	(Germany) FC Augsburg II	Free	22 August 2025	

=== Out ===
Pos.	Player	Transferred to	Fee	Date	Ref.
DF	(Romania) Bogdan Mitrea	Retired		1 June 2025	
DF	(Argentina) Lucas Masoero	(Poland) Bruk-Bet Termalica Nieciecza	Free	1 June 2025	
DF	(Romania) Dorinel Oancea	(Romania) FC Argeș	Free	1 June 2025	
DF	(Spain) Daniel Lasure		Free	1 June 2025	
FW	(Romania) Robert Silaghi	(Romania) Sepsi Sfântu Gheorghe	Free	1 June 2025	
FW	(Armenia) Artur Miranyan		Free	1 June 2025	
MF	(Moldova) Vadim Rață	(Romania) FC Argeș	Free	12 June 2025	
DF	(Romania) Radu Boboc	(Poland) Bruk-Bet Termalica Nieciecza	Free	18 June 2025	
MF	(Romania) Ovidiu Popescu	(Romania) UTA Arad	Free	30 June 2025	
FW	(Tunisia) Adel Bettaieb	(Romania) FC Argeș	Free	14 July 2025	
FW	(Romania) Albert Hofman	(Romania) Chindia Târgoviște	Free	19 July 2025	
FW	(Senegal) Mamadou Thiam	(Romania) FCSB	€50,000	20 August 2025	

== Pre-season and friendlies ==
Win Draw Loss Fixtures

28 June 2025 Friendly	SKU Amstetten (Austria)	1–2	(Romania) Universitatea Cluj	Ardagger, Austria
19:00 CEST (UTC+2)	Hahn 6'		Macalou 39'; Bota 71'	Stadium: Sportplatz SCU Ardagger

30 June 2025 Friendly	Sigma Olomouc (Czech Republic)	3–1	(Romania) Universitatea Cluj	Ansfelden, Austria
19:00 CEST (UTC+2)				Stadium: HAKA Arena Ansfelden

2 July 2025 Friendly	Universitatea Cluj (Romania)	2–5	(Czech Republic) Slavia Prague	Ansfelden, Austria
19:00 CEST (UTC+2)				Stadium: HAKA Arena Ansfelden

4 July 2025 Friendly	Slovan Liberec (Slovakia)	4–1	(Romania) Universitatea Cluj	Ansfelden, Austria
19:00 CEST (UTC+2)				Stadium: HAKA Arena Ansfelden

== Competitions ==
=== Overall record ===
Competition	First match	Last match	Starting round	Final position	Record							
Competition	First match	Last match	Starting round	Final position	Pld	W	D	L	GF	GA	GD	Win %
Liga I	11 July 2025	23 May 2026	Matchday 1	2nd	40	22	7	11	61	38	+23	55.00
Cupa României	29 October 2025	13 May 2026	Group Stage	Runners-up	6	3	2	1	9	5	+4	50.00
Total					46	25	9	12	70	43	+27	54.35

Last updated: 16 July 2026
Source: Competitions

=== Liga I ===
==== League table ====
Pos	Team	Pld	W	D	L	GF	GA	GD	Pts	Qualification
1	Universitatea Craiova	30	17	9	4	53	27	+26	60	Advances to Play-off
2	Rapid București	30	16	8	6	47	30	+17	56	Advances to Play-off
3	Universitatea Cluj	30	16	6	8	48	27	+21	54	Advances to Play-off
4	CFR Cluj	30	15	8	7	49	40	+9	53	Advances to Play-off
5	Dinamo București	30	14	10	6	42	28	+14	52	Advances to Play-off

Source: LPF (in Romanian)
Rules for classification: 1) Points; 2) Head-to-head points; 3) Head-to-head goal difference; 4) Head-to-head goals scored; 5) Goal difference; 6) Goals scored; 7) Play-off.

Pos	Team	Pld	W	D	L	GF	GA	GD	Pts	Qualification	UCV	UCJ	CFR	DIN	RAP	ARG
1	Universitatea Craiova (C)	10	6	2	2	12	6	+6	50	Qualification to Champions League first qualifying round		5–0	2–0	2–1	1–0	0–1
2	Universitatea Cluj	10	6	1	3	13	11	+2	46	Qualification to Europa League first qualifying round (Note: The winner of the 2025–26 Cupa României (Universitatea Craiova) qualifies for the Europa League first qualifying round. Since the champions won the cup, this berth passed to the second place team.)	4–0		2–1	1–1	1–0	1–0
3	CFR Cluj	10	4	4	2	8	7	+1	43	Qualification to Conference League second qualifying round	0–0	1–0		1–1	1–0	1–1
4	Dinamo București	10	3	4	3	13	12	+1	39	Qualification to European competition play-offs	0–1	2–1	0–0		3–1	2–1

Source: LPF (in Romanian)
Legend: Blue = home team win; Yellow = draw; Red = away team win.
Rules for classification: 1) Points; 2) Points without rounding; 3) Points in the regular season; 4) Head-to-head points; 5) Head-to-head goal difference; 6) Head-to-head goals scored; 7) Goal difference; 8) Goals scored; 9) Play-off (only if needed to decide champion or teams for UEFA competitions). (Note: only criteria 7 and 8 are applied to establish the classification during the competition.
(C) Champions
Notes:

Pos	Team	Pld	W	D	L	GF	GA	GD	Pts	Qualification or relegation	UTA	FCS	OTE	BOT	CSI	PET	FAR	HER	UNS	MET
7	UTA Arad (Note: UTA Arad and Oțelul Galați were ineligible to qualify for the European competition play-offs because they did not obtain a UEFA license.)	9	5	2	2	14	7	+7	39					3–1	1–0		0–0	3–2		5–1
8	FCSB (O)	9	4	2	3	13	9	+4	37	Qualification to European competition play-offs	1–0		4–0			3–1			0–0	0–0
9	Oțelul Galați	9	4	2	3	17	15	+2	35		1–0				2–3		3–2	2–0		2–2
10	Botoșani	9	3	3	3	13	17	−4	33 (Note: Botoșani is ahead of Csíkszereda Miercurea Ciuc on points from the regular season.)	Qualification to European competition play-offs		3–2	1–1			1–1			3–2	3–2
11	Csíkszereda Miercurea Ciuc	9	5	2	2	11	8	+3	33			1–0		2–0			1–1		3–2	
12	Petrolul Ploiești	9	2	3	4	9	15	−6	25		1–1		1–5		2–0			1–1		
13	Farul Constanța (O)	9	1	3	5	8	11	−3	25	Qualification to relegation play-offs		2–3		1–1		2–0			0–1	0–1
14	Hermannstadt (R)	9	3	4	2	13	10	+3	25	Dissolved		2–0		3–0	0–0		1–0			
15	Unirea Slobozia (R)	9	2	3	4	11	13	−2	22	Relegated to Liga II	0–1		2–1			1–2		2–2		
16	Metaloglobus București (R)	9	2	4	3	10	14	−4	16	Relegated to Liga II					0–1	1–0		2–2	1–1	

Source: LPF (in Romanian)
Legend: Blue = home team win; Yellow = draw; Red = away team win.
Rules for classification: 1) Points; 2) Points without rounding; 3) Points in the regular season; 4) Head-to-head points; 5) Head-to-head goal difference; 6) Head-to-head goals scored; 7) Goal difference; 8) Goals scored; 9) Play-off (only if needed to decide champion or teams for UEFA competitions). (Note: only criteria 7 and 8 are applied to establish the classification during the competition.
(O) Play-off winners; (R) Relegated

==== Results summary ====
Overall								Home						Away					
Pld	W	D	L	GF	GA	GD	Pts	W	D	L	GF	GA	GD	W	D	L	GF	GA	GD
23	10	6	7	27	20	+7	36	4	5	3	12	10	+2	6	1	4	15	10	+5

===== Results by round =====
Round	1	2	3	4	5	6	7	8	9	10	11	12	13	14	15	16	17	18	19	20	21	22	23	24	25	26	27	28	29	30
Ground	A	H	A	A	H	A	H	A	H	A	H	A	H	A	H	H	A	H	H	A	H	A	H	A	H	A	H	A	H	A
Result	W	D	L	D	D	W	L	W	D	L	D	W	L	W	W	W	W	D	W	W	W	L	W	W	W	W	L	W	W	L
Position	1	1	6	6	8	6	9	8	8	9	9	8	10	9	7	6	5	5	4	4	4	5	4	4	3	3	4	3	3	3

Updated to match(es) played on 9 March 2026. Source: worldfootball
A = Away; H = Home; W = Win; D = Draw; L = Loss

=== Matches ===
11 July 2025 1	Metaloglobus București	1–4	Universitatea Cluj	Clinceni
19:00 EEST (UTC+3)				Stadium: Clinceni

19 July 2025 2	Universitatea Cluj	1–1	UTA Arad	Cluj-Napoca
19:00 EEST (UTC+3)				Stadium: Cluj Arena; Attendance: 8,000

28 July 2025 3	Universitatea Craiova	2–1	Universitatea Cluj	Craiova
18:30 EEST (UTC+3)				Stadium: Ion Oblemenco

3 August 2025 4	Hermannstadt Sibiu	2–2	Universitatea Cluj	Sibiu
18:30 EEST (UTC+3)				Stadium: Municipal

9 August 2025 5	Universitatea Cluj	1–1	Petrolul Ploiești	Sibiu
21:30 EEST (UTC+3)				Stadium: Municipal; Attendance: 1,850

18 August 2025 6	Farul Constanța	0–1	Universitatea Cluj	Ovidiu
21:30 EEST (UTC+3)			Mikanović 4'	Stadium: Central

23 August 2025 7	Universitatea Cluj	0–1	Dinamo București	Cluj-Napoca
20:30 EEST (UTC+3)			Pop 89'	Stadium: Cluj Arena; Attendance: 13,354; Referee: George Găman

30 August 2025 8	Unirea Slobozia	0–1	Universitatea Cluj	Clinceni
17:45 EEST (UTC+3)			Nistor 54'	Stadium: Clinceni; Attendance: 570; Referee: George Roman

12 September 2025 9	Universitatea Cluj	0–0	Rapid București	Cluj-Napoca
20:30 EEST (UTC+3)				Stadium: Cluj Arena; Attendance: 8,732; Referee: Florin Andrei

20 September 2025 10	Argeș Pitești	1–0	Universitatea Cluj	Mioveni
17:45 EEST (UTC+3)	Bettaieb 66'			Stadium: Orășenesc

27 September 2025 11	Universitatea Cluj	2–2	CFR Cluj	Cluj-Napoca
				Stadium: Cluj Arena; Attendance: 14,066

4 October 2025 12	FC Botoșani	1–3	Universitatea Cluj	Botoșani
				Stadium: Municipal

18 October 2025 13	Universitatea Cluj	0–2	FCSB	Cluj-Napoca
				Stadium: Cluj Arena; Attendance: 4,112

25 October 2025 14	Oțelul Galați	1–2	Universitatea Cluj	Galați
				Stadium: Oțelul

1 November 2025 15	Universitatea Cluj	4–1	Csíkszereda Miercurea Ciuc	Cluj-Napoca
				Stadium: Cluj Arena; Attendance: 14,691

8 November 2025 16	Universitatea Cluj	3–1	Metaloglobus București	Cluj-Napoca
				Stadium: Cluj Arena; Attendance: 2,876

22 November 2025 17	UTA Arad	0–2	Universitatea Cluj	Arad
				Stadium: Francisc von Neuman

29 November 2025 18	Universitatea Cluj	0–0	Universitatea Craiova	Cluj-Napoca
				Stadium: Cluj Arena; Attendance: 5,217

7 December 2025 19	Universitatea Cluj	3–0	Hermannstadt Sibiu	Cluj-Napoca
	Lukić			Stadium: Cluj Arena; Attendance: 3,226

13 December 2025 20	Petrolul Ploiești	0–1	Universitatea Cluj	Ploiești
				Stadium: Ilie Oană

20 December 2025 21	Universitatea Cluj	1–0	Farul Constanța	Cluj-Napoca
				Stadium: Cluj Arena; Attendance: 4,026

18 January 2026 22	Dinamo București	1–0	Universitatea Cluj	Bucharest
	Karamoko 41'			Stadium: Arena Națională; Referee: Rareș Vidican

24 January 2026 23	Universitatea Cluj	1–0	Unirea Slobozia	Cluj-Napoca
				Stadium: Cluj Arena; Attendance: 2,489

31 January 2026 24	Rapid București	0–2	Universitatea Cluj	Bucharest
				Stadium: Rapid-Giulești

4 February 2026 25	Universitatea Cluj	3–1	Argeș Pitești	Cluj-Napoca
				Stadium: Cluj Arena; Attendance: 3,437

9 February 2026 26	CFR Cluj	2–3	Universitatea Cluj	Cluj-Napoca
				Stadium: Dr. Constantin Rădulescu

14 February 2026 27	Universitatea Cluj	0–2	FC Botoșani	Cluj-Napoca
				Stadium: Cluj Arena; Attendance: 3,355

21 February 2026 28	FCSB	1–3	Universitatea Cluj	Bucharest
				Stadium: Arena Națională

1 March 2026 29	Universitatea Cluj	4–0	Oțelul Galați	Cluj-Napoca
				Stadium: Cluj Arena; Attendance: 12,450

9 March 2026 30	Csíkszereda Miercurea Ciuc	2–1	Universitatea Cluj	Miercurea Ciuc
				Stadium: Municipal

==== Play-off round ====
===== Play-off table =====
Pos	Team	Pld	W	D	L	GF	GA	GD	Pts	Qualification
1	Universitatea Craiova (C)	10	6	2	2	12	6	+6	50	Qualification to Champions League first qualifying round
2	Universitatea Cluj	10	6	1	3	13	11	+2	46	Qualification to Europa League first qualifying round (Note: The winner of the 2025–26 Cupa României (Universitatea Craiova) qualifies for the Europa League first qualifying round. Since the champions won the cup, this berth passed to the second place team.)
3	CFR Cluj	10	4	4	2	8	7	+1	43	Qualification to Conference League second qualifying round
4	Dinamo București	10	3	4	3	13	12	+1	39	Qualification to European competition play-offs

Source: LPF (in Romanian)
Rules for classification: 1) Points; 2) Points without rounding; 3) Points in the regular season; 4) Head-to-head points; 5) Head-to-head goal difference; 6) Head-to-head goals scored; 7) Goal difference; 8) Goals scored; 9) Play-off (only if needed to decide champion or teams for UEFA competitions). (Note: only criteria 7 and 8 are applied to establish the classification during the competition.
(C) Champions

===== Results by round in Play-off round =====
Round	1	2	3	4	5	6	7	8	9	10
Ground	H	A	A	H	A	A	H	H	A	H
Result	W	W	W	W	L	L	W	W	L	D
Position	3	2	2	1	2	2	2	2	2	2

Updated to match(es) played on 23 May 2026. Source: LPF
A = Away; H = Home; W = Win; D = Draw; L = Loss

=== Matches ===
16 March 2026 1	Universitatea Cluj	2–1	CFR Cluj	Cluj-Napoca
20:30 EET (UTC+2)	Lukić 4' Mendy 90'		Lorenzo Biliboc 1'	Stadium: Cluj Arena

21 March 2026 2	Argeș Pitești	0–1	Universitatea Cluj	Mioveni
20:30 EET (UTC+2)				Stadium: Orășenesc

5 April 2026 3	Rapid București	1–2	Universitatea Cluj	Bucharest
20:30 EEST (UTC+3)	Cătălin Vulturar 20'		Mendy 66', 83'	Stadium: Rapid-Giulești

13 April 2026 4	Universitatea Cluj	4–0	Universitatea Craiova	Cluj-Napoca
21:30 EEST (UTC+3)				Stadium: Cluj Arena

18 April 2026 5	Dinamo București	2–1	Universitatea Cluj	Bucharest
21:00 EEST (UTC+3)	Cîrjan 75' Musi 81'		Trică 84'	Stadium: Arena Națională; Referee: Rareș Vidican

25 April 2026 6	CFR Cluj	1–0	Universitatea Cluj	Cluj-Napoca
20:30 EEST (UTC+3)				Stadium: Dr. Constantin Rădulescu

2 May 2026 7	Universitatea Cluj	1–0	Argeș Pitești	Cluj-Napoca
20:30 EEST (UTC+3)	Nistor 90+2' (pen.)			Stadium: Cluj Arena

9 May 2026 8	Universitatea Cluj	1–0	Rapid București	Cluj-Napoca
21:00 EEST (UTC+3)	Codrea 17'			Stadium: Cluj Arena

17 May 2026 9	Universitatea Craiova	5–0	Universitatea Cluj	Craiova
20:30 EEST (UTC+3)				Stadium: Ion Oblemenco

23 May 2026 10	Universitatea Cluj	1–1	Dinamo București	Cluj-Napoca
20:30 EEST (UTC+3)	Gheorghiță 31'		Musi 85'	Stadium: Cluj Arena; Attendance: 9,521; Referee: Vlad Băban

=== Cupa României ===
==== Group stage ====
Pos	Team	Pld	W	D	L	GF	GA	GD	Pts	Qualification	UCJ	MET	CSI	OTE	SEP	LIE
1	Universitatea Cluj	3	2	1	0	6	3	+3	7	Advance to knockout phase	—	—	—	2–0	—	—
2	Metalul Buzău	3	2	0	1	9	6	+3	6	Advance to knockout phase	1–2	—	—	—	1–0	—
3	Csíkszereda Miercurea Ciuc	3	1	1	1	6	2	+4	4		—	—	—	1–2	0–0	—
4	Oțelul Galați	3	1	1	1	5	6	−1	4		—	—	—	—	—	—
5	Sepsi Sfântu Gheorghe	3	0	2	1	2	3	−1	2		2–2	—	—	—	—	—
6	Sporting Liești	3	0	1	2	7	15	−8	1		—	4–7	0–5	3–3	—	—

Source: Flashscore
Legend: Blue = home team win; Yellow = draw; Red = away team win.

29 October 2025 Group stage	Metalul Buzău	1–2	Universitatea Cluj	Buzău
15:00 EET (UTC+2)	Dumitrache 45+3'		Trică 50' Quadri Taiwo 90+1'	Stadium: Metalul; Referee: Vlad Băban

4 December 2025 Group stage	Sepsi OSK	2–2	Universitatea Cluj	Sfântu Gheorghe
16:15 EET (UTC+2)	Denis Ghimfuș 7' Alexandru Oroian 16'		Trică 35' Postolachi 56'	Stadium: Sepsi Arena; Referee: Robert Avram

11 February 2026 Group stage	Universitatea Cluj	2–0	Oțelul Galați	Cluj-Napoca
20:00 EET (UTC+2)	Lukić 51' Coubiș 67'			Stadium: Cluj Arena; Attendance: 1,000; Referee: Andrei Chivulete

==== Quarter-finals ====
3 March 2026 Quarter-finals	Universitatea Cluj	2–1	Hermannstadt Sibiu	Cluj-Napoca
19:00 EET (UTC+2)	Mendy 73' Macalou 81'		Kevin Ciubotaru Simba 52'	Stadium: Cluj Arena; Attendance: 4,054; Referee: Horia Mladinovici

==== Semi-finals ====
21 April 2026 Semi-finals	Argeș Pitești	1–1 (a.e.t.) (4–5 p)	Universitatea Cluj	Mioveni
19:30 EEST (UTC+3)	Matos 29' (pen.)		Mendy 75'	Stadium: Orășenesc; Attendance: 4,000; Referee: Marcel Bîrsan
	Penalties
	Sadriu (penalty scored); Brobbey (penalty scored); Borța (penalty scored); Blagaić (penalty scored); Bettaieb (penalty missed)		Bic (penalty scored); Lukić (penalty scored); Mendy (penalty scored); Drammeh (penalty scored); Macalou (penalty scored)

==== Final ====
13 May 2026 Final	Universitatea Cluj	0–0 (a.e.t.) (5–6 p)	Universitatea Craiova	Sibiu
20:00 EEST (UTC+3)				Stadium: Municipal; Attendance: 11,736; Referee: Marian Barbu
	Penalties
	Bic (penalty scored); Lukić (penalty scored); Chipciu (penalty scored); Mendy (penalty scored); Trică (penalty scored); Cristea (penalty missed)		Al-Hamlawi (penalty scored); Mora (penalty scored); Teles (penalty scored); Romanchuk (penalty scored); Mekvabishvili (penalty scored); Crețu (penalty scored)

=== UEFA Conference League ===
==== Second qualifying round ====
24 July 2025 First leg	Ararat-Armenia	0–0	(Romania) Universitatea Cluj	Yerevan, Armenia
20:00 UTC+4		Report		Stadium: FFA Academy Stadium; Attendance: 1,450; Referee: Dzmitry Dzmitryieu (Belarus)

31 July 2025 Second leg	Universitatea Cluj (Romania)	1–2 (a.e.t.) (1–2 agg.)	Ararat-Armenia	Sibiu, Romania
20:00 UTC+3	Jovo Lukić 13'	Report	Kamo Hovhannisyan 53'; Eric Ayiah 117'	Stadium: Stadionul Municipal; Attendance: 10,158; Referee: David Fuxman (Israel)
