= 2024–25 CS Universitatea Craiova season =

CS Universitatea Craiova
2024–25 season
- Manager: Constantin Gâlcă (until 28 January); Mirel Rădoi (from 29 January)
- Stadium: Ion Oblemenco Stadium
- Liga I: 3rd
- Cupa României: Quarter-finals
- UEFA Conference League: Second qualifying round
- Average home league attendance: 11,009
Home colours	Away colours	Third colours

The 2024–25 season was the 77th season in the history of CS Universitatea Craiova, and the club's 11th consecutive season in Liga I. In addition to the domestic league, the club participated in the Cupa României and the UEFA Conference League.

== Transfers ==
=== In ===
Pos.	Player	Transferred from	Fee	Date	Source
MF	(Romania) Alexandru Cîmpanu	(Romania) Universitatea Cluj	Loan return	30 June 2024	
DF	(Romania) Denis Benga	(Romania) Ceahlăul Piatra Neamț	Loan return	30 June 2024	
MF	(Croatia) Ante Roguljić	(Romania) CFR Cluj	Loan return	30 June 2024	
MF	(Romania) Atanas Trică	(Romania) CS Tunari	Loan return	30 June 2024	
MF	(Costa Rica) Carlos Mora	(Costa Rica) Alajuelense	€300,000	1 July 2024	
MF	(Japan) Takuto Oshima	(Poland) Cracovia	Free	1 July 2024	
GK	(Romania) Silviu Lung Jr.	(Romania) Politehnica Iași	Free	1 July 2024	
MF	(Cuba) Luis Paradela	(Costa Rica) Deportivo Saprissa	Loan	1 July 2024	
DF	(Spain) Grego	(Spain) Burgos CF	Free	3 July 2024	

=== Out ===
Pos.	Player	Transferred to	Fee	Date	Source
MF	(Romania) Atanas Trică		Contract termination	1 July 2024	
MF	(Bosnia and Herzegovina) Zvonimir Kožulj	(Bosnia and Herzegovina) Široki Brijeg	End of contract	1 July 2024	
MF	(Romania) Alexandru Mateiu	(Romania) Petrolul Ploiești	End of contract	1 July 2024	
DF	(Brazil) Raúl Silva	(Portugal) Farense		1 July 2024	
FW	(Spain) Jalen Blesa	(Georgia (country)) Dinamo Batumi	Loan	1 July 2024	
DF	(Finland) Pyry Soiri	(Greece) Athens Kallithea		4 July 2024	
FW	(Romania) Jovan Marković	(Romania) Hermannstadt	Loan	17 July 2024	

== Friendlies ==
=== Pre-season ===
23 June 2024 Friendly	Universitatea Craiova (Romania)	1–2	(Cyprus) Pafos FC	Wörgl, Austria
18:00	Koljić 6'		Pelágio 12'; Twumasi 82'	Stadium: Sportstadion Wörgl

24 June 2024 Friendly	Legia Warsaw (Poland)	0–1	(Romania) Universitatea Craiova	Jenbach, Austria
18:00			Căpățână 63'	Stadium: Stadion Jenbach

26 June 2024 Friendly	Śląsk Wrocław (Poland)	v	(Romania) Universitatea Craiova

29 June 2024 Friendly	Ludogorets Razgrad (Bulgaria)	4–1	(Romania) Universitatea Craiova	Jenbach, Austria
18:00	Caio Vidal 31'; Rick 37'; Son 54'; Chochev 62'		Mora 67'	Stadium: Stadion Jenbach

30 June 2024 Friendly	Universitatea Craiova (Romania)	1–2	(Switzerland) St. Gallen	Kematen
17:00	Mitriță 11'		Geubbels 14'; Neziri 52'	Stadium: Sportplatz Kematen

6 July 2024 Friendly	Universitatea Craiova (Romania)	1–0	(Romania) CSC Dumbrăvița
17:00

11 January 2025 Friendly	Oțelul (Romania)	2–1	(Romania) Universitatea Craiova	Buftea
13:00		Report		Stadium: Centrul de Fotbal Buftea Teren Sintetic

12 January 2025 Friendly	Universitatea Craiova (Romania)	1–0	(Romania) Politehnica Iași	Buftea
11:00		Report		Stadium: Centrul de Fotbal Buftea Teren Sintetic

== Competitions ==
=== Overall record ===
Competition	First match	Last match	Starting round	Final position	Record							
Competition	First match	Last match	Starting round	Final position	Pld	W	D	L	GF	GA	GD	Win %
Liga I	12 July 2024		Matchday 1		4	2	2	0	6	2	+4	50.00
Cupa României					0	0	0	0	0	0	+0	—
UEFA Conference League	25 July 2024	1 August	Second qualifying round	Second qualifying round	2	1	0	1	3	4	−1	50.00
Total					6	3	2	1	9	6	+3	50.00

Last updated: 4 August 2024
Source: Soccerway

=== Liga I ===
==== League table ====
Pos	Team	Pld	W	D	L	GF	GA	GD	Pts	Advances
1	FCSB	30	15	11	4	43	24	+19	56	Qualification for play-off round
2	CFR Cluj	30	14	12	4	56	32	+24	54	Qualification for play-off round
3	Universitatea Craiova	30	14	10	6	45	28	+17	52 (Note: Ranked on head-to-head points: Universitatea Craiova (4); Universitatea Cluj (1).)	Qualification for play-off round
4	Universitatea Cluj	30	14	10	6	43	27	+16	52	Qualification for play-off round
5	Dinamo București	30	13	12	5	41	26	+15	51	Qualification for play-off round

Source: LPF (in Romanian)
Rules for classification: 1) Points; 2) Head-to-head points; 3) Head-to-head goal difference; 4) Head-to-head goals scored; 5) Goal difference; 6) Goals scored; 7) Play-off.

==== Results summary ====
Overall								Home						Away					
Pld	W	D	L	GF	GA	GD	Pts	W	D	L	GF	GA	GD	W	D	L	GF	GA	GD
21	9	8	4	33	21	+12	35	5	4	1	19	9	+10	4	4	3	14	12	+2

Last updated: 21 December 2024.

==== Results by round ====
Round	1	2	3	4	5	6	7	8	9	10	11	12	13	14	15	16	17	18	19	20	21	22	23	24
Ground	A	H	A	H	A	H	A	H	A	A	H	A	H	A	H	H	A	H	A	H	A	H	A	H
Result	D	W	W	D	W	W	L	D	L	D	W	D	D	L	D	W	W	L	D	W	W			
Position	9	2	1	2	1	1	2	3	5	5	4	4	4	4	4	4	4	4	4	4	4			

Updated to match(es) played on 21 December 2024. Source:
A = Away; H = Home; W = Win; D = Draw; L = Loss

==== Matches ====
The match schedule was released on 1 July 2024.

12 July 2024 1	Hermannstadt	0–0	Universitatea Craiova	Sibiu
21:30	Balaure (yellow card) 90+4'		Paradela (yellow card) 25'	Stadium: Sibiu Municipal Stadium; Attendance: 6,000; Referee: Szabolcs Kovacs

20 July 2024 2	Universitatea Craiova	4–2	UTA Arad	Craiova
19:00	Zajkov 35'; Paradela 58'; Baiaram 73'; Mitriță 90+3'		Ezekiel 45'; Benga 90+2'	Stadium: Ion Oblemenco Stadium; Referee: Andrei Florin Chivulete

28 July 2024 3	CFR Cluj	0–2	Universitatea Craiova	Cluj-Napoca
22:00 UTC+3	Kamara (yellow card) 29' (yellow-red card) 45'; Krešić (yellow card) 34'; Ajeti (yellow card) 66'		Vlădoiu (yellow card) 47'; Koljić 51'; Crețu (yellow card) 57'; Paradela (yellow card) 72'; Mitriță 90+5', (yellow card) 90+6'	Stadium: Dr. Constantin Rădulescu Stadium; Referee: Marcel Bîrsan

4 August 2024 4	Universitatea Craiova	0–0	Petrolul Ploiești	Craiova
19:00				Stadium: Ion Oblemenco Stadium; Referee: Ionuţ Coza

11 August 2024 5	Sepsi OSK	1–2	Universitatea Craiova	Sfântu Gheorghe
19:00 EET	Mino (yellow card) 45+4'; Debeljuh 69'	Report	Mitriță 32' 82'; Basilio Ndong (yellow card) 38'; Popescu (yellow card) 67'; Crețu (yellow card) 68' (yellow-red card) 90+6'; Bancu (yellow card) 78'	Stadium: Sepsi Arena Stadium; Attendance: 4,732; Referee: (Romania) Radu Petrescu

16 August 2024 6	Universitatea Craiova	5–1	Gloria Buzău	Craiova
22:00 EET	Paradela (yellow card) 32'; Maldonado 35' (yellow card) 49'; Bană 45'; Mitriță 63' (yellow card) 77'; Mekvabishvili 73'; Căpățînă 84'	Report	Ricardo Matos (yellow card) 19'; Ferraresso (yellow card) 52'; Budescu 67'; Dobrosavlevici (yellow card) 88'	Stadium: Ion Oblemenco Stadium; Attendance: 8,250; Referee: (Romania) George Cătălin Roman

24 August 2024 7	Dinamo București	2–1	Universitatea Craiova	Bucharest
22:00 EET	Bani 1'; Gnahoré 42'; Opruț (yellow card) 49'; Sivis (red card) 58'; Homawoo (yellow card) 80' (yellow-red card) 82'; Licsandru (yellow card) 87'; Mărginean (yellow card) 87'; Golubović (yellow card) 90+4'; Costin (yellow card) 90+6'	Report	Koljić 44'; Vlădoiu (yellow card) 65'; Houri (yellow card) 87'	Stadium: Arcul de Triumf Stadium; Attendance: 7,126; Referee: (Romania) Marian Barbu

31 August 2024 8	Universitatea Craiova	1–1	Rapid București	Craiova
21:30 EET	Koljić (yellow card) 12'; Grego (yellow card) 27'; Mitriță 33' (pen.); Vlădoiu (yellow card) 52'; Baiaram (yellow card) 53'	Report	Braun 18'; Petrila (yellow card) 28'; Săpunaru (yellow card) 32'	Stadium: Ion Oblemenco Stadium; Attendance: 19,940; Referee: (Romania) István Kovács

15 September 2024 9	Politehnica Iași	2–0	Universitatea Craiova	Iași
18:15 EET	Kamberi 30'; Bordeianu (yellow card) 72'; Tailson (yellow card) 89' (goal) 90+10'; Ispas (yellow card) 90+5'; Gheorghiță (yellow card) 90+9'	Report	Vlădoiu (yellow card) 89'; Houri (yellow card) 90'	Stadium: Emil Alexandrescu Stadium; Attendance: 3,205; Referee: (Romania) Rareș Vidican

22 September 2024 10	Universitatea Cluj	1–1	Universitatea Craiova	Cluj-Napoca
21:30 EET	Thiam 38'; Cristea (yellow card) 49'; Berto (yellow card) 50'; Simion (yellow card) 59'; Boboc (yellow card) 78'	Report	Oshima (yellow card) 30' (goal) 68'; Maldonado (yellow card) 40'; Paradela (yellow card) 45+1'	Stadium: Cluj Arena; Attendance: 12,055; Referee: (Romania) Andrei Chivulete

30 September 2024 11	Universitatea Craiova	3–0	Unirea Slobozia	Craiova
21:00 EET	Baiaram 38' 42'; Lukić (yellow card) 72'; Oshima (yellow card) 89'; Mitriță 90+4'	Report	Ștefan Pacionel (yellow card) 33'; Ionuț Dinu (yellow card) 65' (yellow-red card) 84'	Stadium: Ion Oblemenco Stadium; Attendance: 5,834; Referee: (Romania) Horațiu Feșnic

5 October 2024 12	Oțelul	1–1	Universitatea Craiova	Galați
21:30 EET	Jurić 5'; João Lameira (yellow card) 38'	Report	Baiaram 14'	Stadium: Oțelul Stadium; Referee: (Romania) István Kovács

20 October 2024 13	Universitatea Craiova	0–0	Botoșani	Craiova
16:00 EET		Report	Mitrov (yellow card) 78'; Álex Díez (yellow card) 89'	Stadium: Ion Oblemenco Stadium; Attendance: 9,090; Referee: (Romania) Ionuţ Coza

28 October 2024 14	Farul Constanța	3–2	Universitatea Craiova	Ovidiu
21:00 EET	Grigoryan 6'; Alibec 12'; Gustavo Marins (yellow card) 21' (goal) 59'; Dican (yellow card) 31'; Vînă (yellow card) 45+3' (yellow-red card) 48'; Sîrbu (yellow card) 65'; Buzbuchi (yellow card) 90+7'	Report	Maldonado (yellow card) 35'; Houri 52' (pen.); Paradela 90+5' (yellow card) 90+5'	Stadium: Central Stadium; Referee: (Romania) Marcel Bîrsan

3 November 2024 15	Universitatea Craiova	1–1	FCSB	Craiova
21:00 EET	Cicâldău (yellow card) 8' (goal) 62' (pen.); Vlădoiu (yellow card) 12' (yellow-red card) 41'; Paradela (yellow card) 70'; Screciu (yellow card) 90+10'	Report	Tănase (yellow card) 4'; Miculescu 17'; Radunović (yellow card) 69'; Dawa (yellow card) 80' (yellow-red card) 90+10'; Chiricheș (yellow card) 84'; Alhassan (red card) 90+9'	Stadium: Ion Oblemenco Stadium; Attendance: 23,123; Referee: (Romania) Florin Andrei

9 November 2024 16	Universitatea Craiova	3–1	Hermannstadt	Craiova
18:15 EET	Koljić 19' (pen.); Maldonado 50'; Bancu 65'	Report	Chițu 12'	Stadium: Ion Oblemenco Stadium; Referee: (Romania) Horia Mladinovici

25 November 2024 17	UTA Arad	1–2	Universitatea Craiova	Arad
20:30 EET	Fábry 18'; Mabea (yellow card) 31'; Costache (yellow card) 74'; Mihai (yellow card) 83'	Report	Bancu (yellow card) 42'; Lukić 68'; Mitriță (yellow card) 74' (goal) 82' (pen.)	Stadium: Francisc von Neuman Stadium; Attendance: 7,500; Referee: (Romania) Rareș Vidican

1 December 2024 18	Universitatea Craiova	0–2	CFR Cluj	Craiova
20:30 EET	Screciu (yellow card) 15'; Bancu (yellow card) 40'; Ivan (yellow card) 70'	Report	Ilie 5'; Simão Rocha (yellow card) 10'; Mogoș (yellow card) 58'; Korenica 87' (yellow card) 89'; Fică (yellow card) 90+2'	Stadium: Ion Oblemenco Stadium; Referee: (Romania) Marcel Bîrsan

7 December 2024 19	Petrolul Ploiești	1–1	Universitatea Craiova	Ploiești
20:00 EET	Tudorie 25'; Jyry (yellow card) 45'; Papp (yellow card) 68'; Dumitriu (yellow card) 88'	Report	Mora (yellow card) 49'; Baiaram 73'; Koljić (yellow card) 75'	Stadium: Ilie Oană Stadium; Referee: (Romania) Marian Barbu

14 December 2024 20	Universitatea Craiova	2–1	Sepsi OSK	Craiova
17:00 EET	Maldonado 27'; Căpățînă (yellow card) 50'; Baiaram 68' (yellow card) 77'	Report	Oberlin 39'; Oteliță (yellow card) 43'	Stadium: Ion Oblemenco Stadium; Attendance: 4,516; Referee: (Romania) Andrei Chivulete

21 December 2024 21	Gloria Buzău	0–2	Universitatea Craiova	Buzău
19:30 EET	Albu (yellow card) 84'	Report	Paradela 18'; Bancu (yellow card) 58'; Căpățînă (yellow card) 64'; Mitriță (yellow card) 81'; Baiaram 90+1'	Stadium: Buzău Municipal Stadium (Crâng Stadium); Referee: (Romania) Andrei Moroiţă

19 January 2025 22	Universitatea Craiova	–	Dinamo București	Craiova
20:30 EET				Stadium: Ion Oblemenco Stadium

=== Cupa României ===
==== Group stage ====
===== Group B =====
Pos	Team	Pld	W	D	L	GF	GA	GD	Pts	Qualification	MET	UCV	FCS	PET	DIN	AGR
1	Metalul Buzău	3	2	1	0	4	0	+4	7	Advance to knockout phase	—	1–0	—	—	0–0	—
2	Universitatea Craiova	3	2	0	1	4	1	+3	6	Advance to knockout phase	—	—	—	—	—	—
3	FCSB	3	2	0	1	6	3	+3	6		—	0–2	—	—	—	—
4	Petrolul Ploiești	3	1	1	1	3	2	+1	4		—	0–2	—	—	—	—
5	Dinamo București	3	0	2	1	0	4	−4	2		—	—	0–4	0–0	—	—
6	Agricola Borcea	3	0	0	3	1	8	−7	0		0–3	—	1–2	0–3	—	—

Source: FRF
Legend: Blue = home team win; Yellow = draw; Red = away team win.

31 October 2024	Metalul Buzău	1-0	Universitatea Craiova	Buzău
18:30 EET	Borțoneanu (yellow card) 31'; Valentin Robu 83'	Report	Basilio Ndong (yellow card) 11'; Căpățînă (yellow card) 78'; Houri (yellow card) 90+6'	Stadium: Buzău Municipal Stadium; Referee: (Romania) Bogdan Dumitrache

4 December 2024	Petrolul Ploiești	0-2	Universitatea Craiova	Ploiești
20:00 EET	Roche (yellow card) 46'	Report	Oshima (yellow card) 51'; Bană 56'; Grego (yellow card) 68'; Basilio Ndong (yellow card) 81'; Houri 87'	Stadium: Ilie Oană Stadium; Referee: (Romania) Adrian Cojocaru

18 December 2024	FCSB	0-2	Universitatea Craiova	Bucharest
20:00 EET	Alhassan (yellow card) 45'; Dawa (yellow card) 83'	Report	Bană (yellow card) 34'; Mora 45+1'; Mitriță 84'; Oshima (yellow card) 88'	Stadium: Arena Națională; Referee: (Romania) Horațiu Feșnic

1 April 2025 Quarter-finals	CFR Cluj	-	Universitatea Craiova	Cluj-Napoca
				Stadium: Dr. Constantin Rădulescu Stadium

=== UEFA Conference League ===
==== Second qualifying round ====
The draw was held on 19 June 2024.

25 July 2024 First leg	Maribor (Slovenia)	2–0	(Romania) Universitatea Craiova	Maribor, Slovenia
20:15 UTC+2	Repas 57'; Jakupović 88'	Report	Maldonado (red card) 31'	Stadium: Ljudski vrt Attendance: 5,500; Referee: Mads Kristoffersen

1 August 2024 Second leg	Universitatea Craiova (Romania)	3–2 (3–4 agg.)	(Slovenia) Maribor	Craiova
20:00 UTC+3		Report		Stadium: Ion Oblemenco Stadium
