= Macalou =

Macalou is a surname. Notable people with the surname include:

- Issouf Macalou (born 1998), Ivorian footballer
- Sekou Macalou (born 1995), French rugby union player
