= Omar El Sawy =

Romanian footballer (born 2004)

Personal information
- Full name: Omar Sayed Mohamed Mahmoud El Sawy
- Date of birth: 16 March 2004 (age 22)
- Place of birth: Târgu Mureș, Romania
- Height: 1.85 m (6 ft 1 in)
- Positions: Winger; attacking midfielder

Team information
- Current team: UTA Arad (on loan from Rapid București)
- Number: 42

Youth career
- –2017: ACS Kinder Târgu Mureș
- 2017–2018: ASA Târgu Mureș
- 2018–2019: CSM Târgu Mureș
- 2019–2022: FK Csíkszereda

Senior career*
Years	Team	Apps	(Gls)
2022–2023	FK Csíkszereda	21	(1)
2023–	Rapid București	16	(0)
2024–2025	→ Sepsi OSK (loan)	23	(6)
2025–2026	→ Universitatea Cluj (loan)	23	(1)
2026–	→ UTA Arad (loan)	7	(2)

International career^{‡}
2021	Romania U17	1	(0)
2021–2022	Romania U18	3	(1)
2022	Romania U19	5	(0)
2024–2025	Romania U20	5	(0)
2025	Romania U21	2	(0)
- * Club domestic league appearances and goals as of 6 November 2026 ‡ National team caps and goals as of 18 November 2025

Omar Sayed Mohamed Mahmoud El Sawy (Arabic: عمر سيد محمد محمود الصاوي; born 16 March 2004) is a Romanian professional footballer who plays as a winger or an attacking midfielder for Liga I club UTA Arad, on loan from Rapid București.

== Club career ==
=== Early career / FK Csíkszereda ===
At junior level, El Sawy represented several clubs from his native Târgu Mureș as well as FK Csíkszereda. He made his senior debut for the latter side on 6 August 2022, in a 1–2 away Liga II loss to Unirea Dej. On the 28th that month, El Sawy scored his first goal in a 3–2 win over Buzău.

=== Rapid București ===
On 19 May 2023, El Sawy was signed by Liga I side Rapid București for a rumoured transfer fee of €400,000, including bonuses. He made his professional debut on 10 November 2023, in a goalless league draw at Sepsi OSK.

==== Loan to Sepsi OSK ====
In the autumn of 2024, Rapid agreed to send El Sawy on loan to Sepsi OSK for the rest of the season, in order to gain playing minutes. On 6 October 2024, he debuted in a 0–4 away win against Hermannstadt by scoring his first goal for his team.

== Personal life ==
El Sawy was born in Târgu Mureș, Romania, to an Egyptian father and a Romanian mother of partial Hungarian descent.

== Career statistics ==
As of match played 6 November 2026

Appearances and goals by club, season and competition
Club	Season	League			Cupa României		Europe		Other		Total	
Club	Season	Division	Apps	Goals	Apps	Goals	Apps	Goals	Apps	Goals	Apps	Goals
FK Csíkszereda	2022–23	Liga II	21	1	0	0	—		—		21	1
Rapid București	2023–24	Liga I	6	0	1	0	—		—		7	0
Rapid București	2024–25	Liga I	3	0	—		—		—		3	0
Rapid București	2025–26	Liga I	2	0	—		—		—		2	0
Rapid București	2026–27	Liga I	5	0	—		—		—		5	0
Rapid București	Total		16	0	1	0	—		—		17	0
Sepsi OSK (loan)	2024–25	Liga I	23	6	1	0	—		—		24	6
Universitatea Cluj (loan)	2025–26	Liga I	23	1	3	0	—		—		26	1
UTA Arad (loan)	2026–27	Liga I	7	2	1	0	—		—		8	2
Career total			90	10	6	0	—		—		96	10

== Honours ==
Universitatea Cluj

- Cupa României runner-up: 2025–26
