= Jovo Lukić =

Bosnian footballer (born 1998)

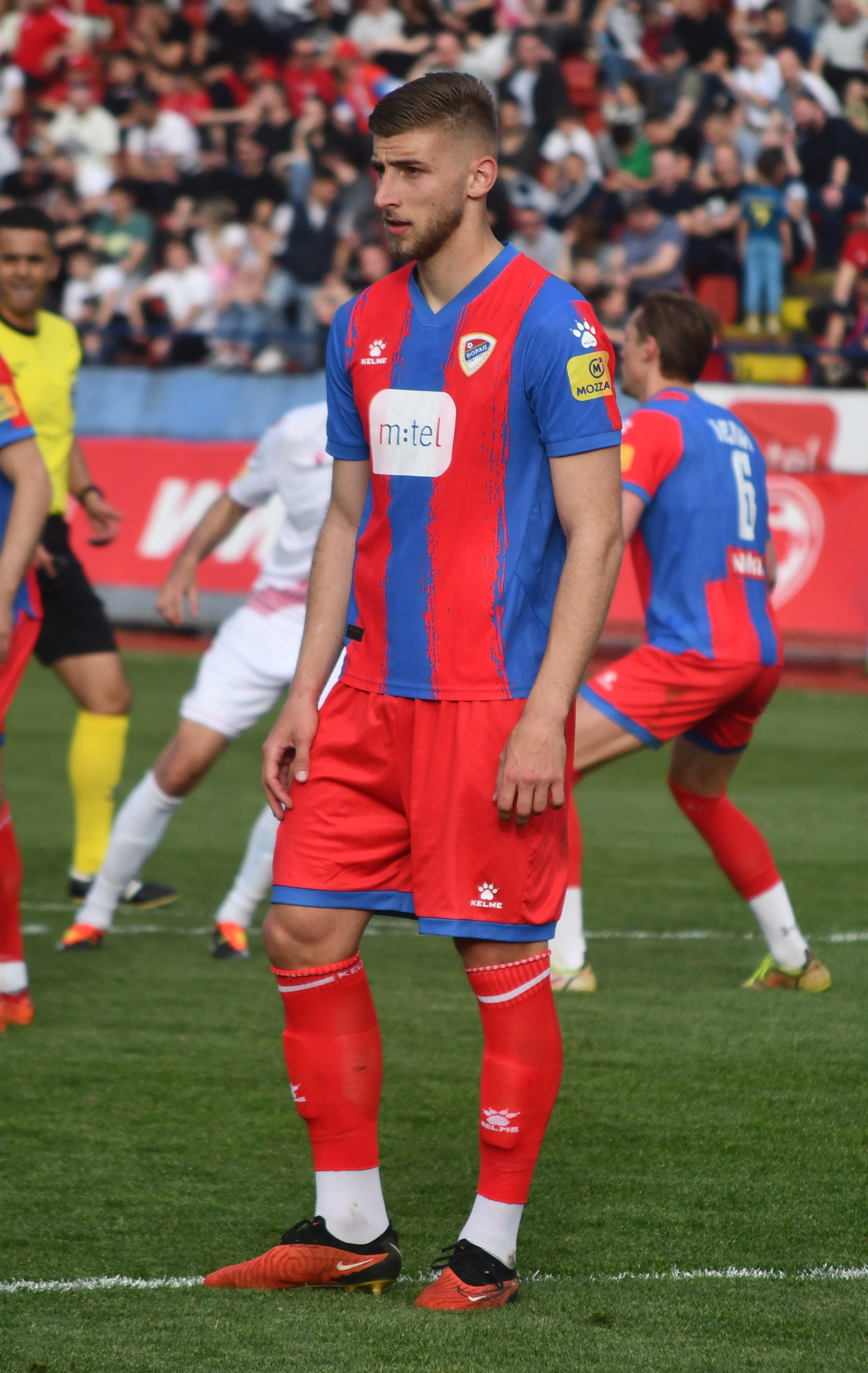
- Lukić with Borac Banja Luka in 2024

Personal information
- Date of birth: 28 November 1998 (age 27)
- Place of birth: Šabac, FR Yugoslavia
- Height: 1.93 m (6 ft 4 in)
- Position: Forward

Team information
- Current team: Universitatea Cluj
- Number: 17

Youth career
- 2009–2015: Modriča
- 2015–2016: Sloga Doboj

Senior career*
Years	Team	Apps	(Gls)
2016–2018	Sloga Doboj	43	(13)
2018–2020	Krupa	36	(12)
2019	→ Zvijezda Gradačac (loan)	14	(5)
2020–2024	Borac Banja Luka	108	(32)
2024–2025	Universitatea Craiova	27	(2)
2025–	Universitatea Cluj	44	(25)

International career^{‡}
2018–2020	Bosnia and Herzegovina U21	4	(0)
2021–	Bosnia and Herzegovina	10	(1)
- * Club domestic league appearances and goals as of 7 November 2026 ‡ National team caps and goals as of 17 November 2026

Jovo Lukić (Serbian Cyrillic: Јово Лукић, Serbian pronunciation: [jôːʋo lǔkitɕ]; born 28 November 1998) is a professional footballer who plays as a forward for Liga I club Universitatea Cluj. Born in Serbia, he plays for the Bosnia and Herzegovina national team.

Lukić started his professional career at Sloga Doboj, before joining Krupa in 2018. In 2019, he was loaned to Zvijezda Gradačac. The following year, he signed with Borac Banja Luka.

A former youth international for Bosnia and Herzegovina, Lukić made his senior international debut in 2021.

== Early life ==
Jovo and his family, who are ethnic Serbs, hail from Gračanica and Modriča, Bosnia and Herzegovina, where they live. However, he was born in Šabac, FR Yugoslavia (present-day Serbia), on 28 November 1998.

== Club career ==
Lukić started playing football at Modriča, before joining the youth setup of Sloga Doboj. He made his professional debut against Sutjeska Foča on 6 August 2016 at the age of 17. On 19 November, he scored his first professional goal in a triumph over Kozara Gradiška. Lukić scored his first career hat-trick against Borac Šamac on 10 June 2017.

In February 2018, he moved to Krupa. In February 2019, he was loaned to Zvijezda Gradačac until the end of season.

On 20 June 2020, Lukić signed with Borac Banja Luka. He debuted for Borac in a league game against Mladost Doboj Kakanj on 1 August 2020.

On 9 September 2024, Lukić signed with Universitatea Craiova, and in 2025 moved to Universitatea Cluj, both clubs of Romanian Liga I.

== International career ==
Lukić was a member of Bosnia and Herzegovina under-21 team under coach Vinko Marinović, and earned his first senior cap for Bosnia and Herzegovina on 19 December 2021 in a friendly 1–0 defeat to the United States.

On 9 March 2026, Lukić earned a recall to the senior national team under coach Sergej Barbarez for the play-off matches in the 2026 FIFA World Cup qualifiers, first of which was an away win against Wales on 26 March, and then a win against Italy in Zenica five days later. However, he did not enter the official squad list for these matches due to an arm injury.

In June 2026, Lukić was named in Bosnia and Herzegovina's squad for the 2026 World Cup. On 12 June, he scored his first international goal in a 1–1 draw against Canada during both teams' opening group stage game of the World Cup.

== Personal life ==
Lukić's father Mitar was also a professional footballer.

Lukić married his long-time girlfriend Zorana. Together they have a son.

== Career statistics ==
=== Club ===
As of match played 7 November 2026

Club	Season	League			National cup (Note: Includes Bosnia and Herzegovina Cup, Cupa României)		Continental		Other		Total	
Club	Season	Division	Apps	Goals	Apps	Goals	Apps	Goals	Apps	Goals	Apps	Goals
Sloga Doboj	2016–17	First League of RS	28	10	—		—		—		28	10
Sloga Doboj	2017–18	First League of RS	15	3	—		—		—		15	3
Sloga Doboj	Total		43	13	—		—		—		43	13
Krupa	2017–18	Bosnian Premier League	8	0	3	0	—		—		11	0
Krupa	2018–19	Bosnian Premier League	14	0	2	0	—		—		16	0
Krupa	2019–20	First League of RS	14	12	0	0	—		—		14	12
Krupa	Total		36	12	5	0	—		—		41	12
Zvijezda Gradačac (loan)	2018–19	First League of FBiH	14	5	0	0	—		—		14	5
Borac Banja Luka	2020–21	Bosnian Premier League	17	8	2	2	2 (Note: Appearances in UEFA Europa League)	0	—		21	10
Borac Banja Luka	2021–22	Bosnian Premier League	29	8	3	1	1 (Note: Appearance(s) in UEFA Conference League)	0	—		33	9
Borac Banja Luka	2022–23	Bosnian Premier League	30	2	2	1	2	0	—		34	3
Borac Banja Luka	2023–24	Bosnian Premier League	31	12	5	1	2	0	—		38	13
Borac Banja Luka	2024–25	Bosnian Premier League	1	2	—		8 (Note: Four appearances and one goal in UEFA Champions League, four appearances in UEFA Europa League)	1	—		9	3
Borac Banja Luka	Total		108	32	12	5	15	1	—		135	38
Universitatea Craiova	2024–25	Liga I	27	2	4	0	—		—		31	2
Universitatea Cluj	2025–26	Liga I	32	18	5	1	2	1	—		39	20
Universitatea Cluj	2026–27	Liga I	12	7	2	2	2	2	0	0	16	11
Universitatea Cluj	Total		44	25	7	3	4	3	0	0	55	31
Career total			272	89	28	8	19	4	0	0	319	101

=== International ===
As of match played 17 November 2026

National team	Year	Apps	Goals
Bosnia and Herzegovina
Bosnia and Herzegovina	2021	1	0
Bosnia and Herzegovina	2026 (Note: Two appearances and one goal in the 2026 FIFA World Cup)	9	1
Total		10	1

Scores and results list Bosnia and Herzegovina's goal tally first, score column indicates score after each Lukić goal.

List of international goals scored by Jovo Lukić
No.	Date	Venue	Cap	Opponent	Score	Result	Competition
1	12 June 2026	BMO Field, Toronto, Canada	4	Canada	1–0	1–1	2026 FIFA World Cup

== Honours ==
Krupa

- First League of RS: 2019–20
- Bosnian Cup runner-up: 2017–18

Borac Banja Luka

- Bosnian Premier League: 2020–21, 2023–24
- Bosnian Cup runner-up: 2020–21, 2023–24

Universitatea Cluj

- Cupa României runner-up: 2025–26
- Supercupa României runner-up: 2026

Individual

- First League of RS top goalscorer: 2019–20
- Liga I top scorer: 2025–26
- Liga I Team of the Season: 2025–26
