= Marian Barbu =

Romanian football referee (born 1988)

- Full name: Marian Alexandru Barbu
- Born: 13 August 1988 (age 38); Făgăraș, Romania
Years		Role
2025		Referee

Marian Alexandru Barbu (born 13 August 1988) is a Romanian football referee who officiates in domestic competitions in Romania and international matches under the auspices of UEFA and FIFA.

He has been listed as a UEFA First Category referee and has officiated matches in European club competitions, UEFA Champions League, international tournaments, and national team competitions.

== Refereeing career ==
Barbu began his refereeing career in Romania at county level before progressing through the national leagues. He later became a regular referee in Romania's top domestic division, Liga I, earning recognition for his performances at national level. In July 2025, Barbu was appointed as the referee for the 2025 Supercupa României, the Romanian Super Cup match between FCSB and CFR Cluj, played at Stadionul Steaua in Bucharest.

Barbu has officiated matches in UEFA club competitions, including the UEFA Europa League and UEFA Europa Conference League. His refereeing team has been delegated to multiple European fixtures by UEFA.

In 2025, Barbu made his debut as a central referee in the UEFA Champions League, officiating a group-stage match between Slavia Prague and Bodø/Glimt. He has also been appointed to referee matches in the UEFA Nations League and UEFA European Under-21 Championship qualification rounds.

Also, Barbu was selected as a match official for the 2025 FIFA U-17 World Cup, where he officiated group-stage matches, including Costa Rica versus the United Arab Emirates.
