= Edvinas Gertmonas =

Lithuanian footballer (born 1996)

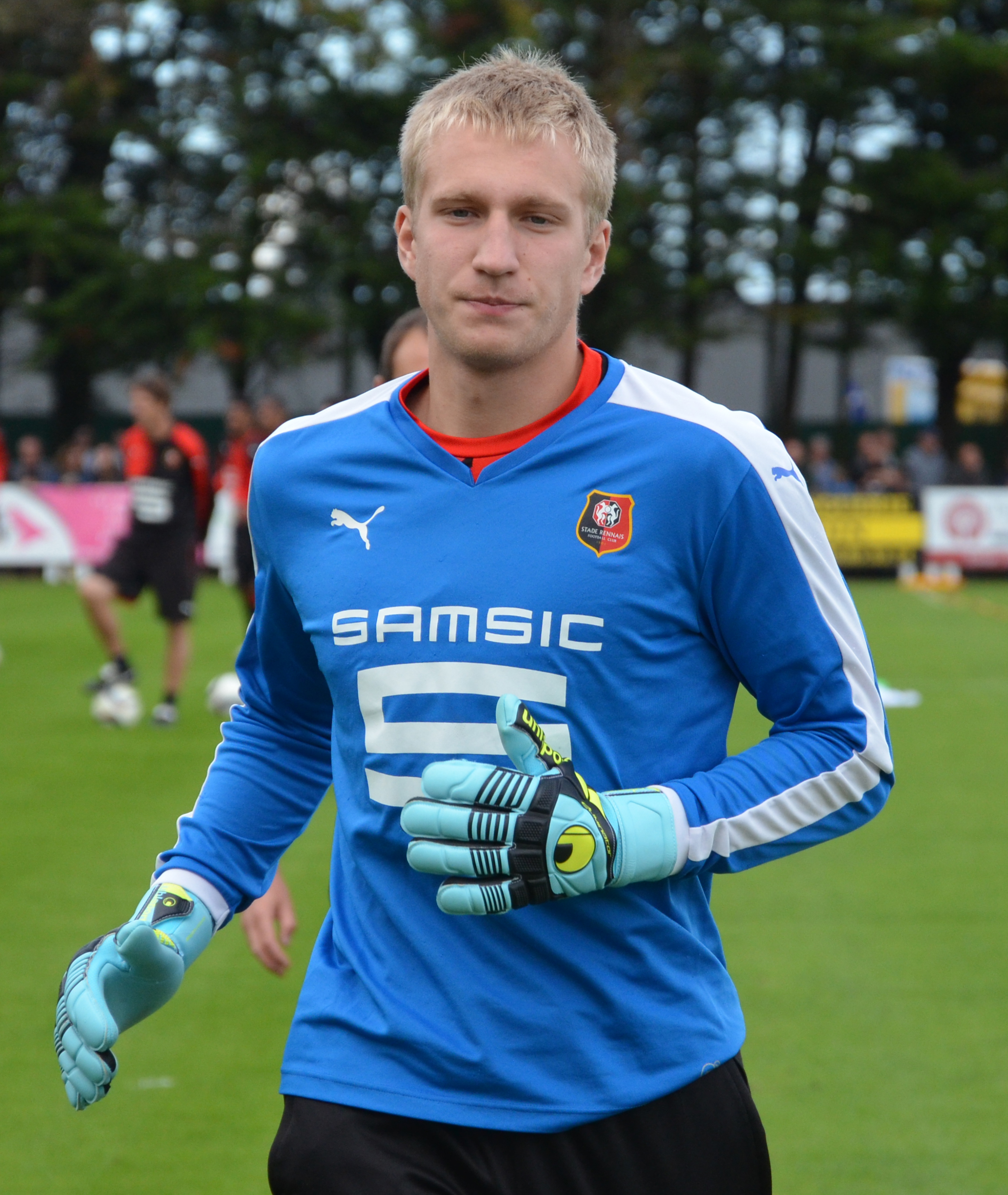
- Gertmonas with Rennes in 2015

Personal information
- Date of birth: 1 June 1996 (age 30)
- Place of birth: Šilalė, Lithuania
- Height: 1.92 m (6 ft 4 in)
- Position: Goalkeeper

Team information
- Current team: Servette
- Number: 1

Youth career
- –2012: FK NFA

Senior career*
Years	Team	Apps	(Gls)
2013–2014	Tauras Tauragė	12	(0)
2014	Atlantas	9	(0)
2015–2019	Rennes	0	(0)
2015	→ Atlantas (loan)	15	(0)
2016–2019	Rennes B	48	(0)
2019–2023	Žalgiris	77	(0)
2024–2026	Universitatea Cluj	66	(0)
2026–	Servette	7	(0)

International career^{‡}
2012–2013	Lithuania U17	16	(0)
2013–2015	Lithuania U19	16	(0)
2013–2017	Lithuania U21	21	(0)
2015–	Lithuania	25	(0)
- * Club domestic league appearances and goals as of 28 September 2026 ‡ National team caps and goals as of 29 March 2026

Edvinas Gertmonas (born 1 June 1996) is a Lithuanian professional footballer who plays as a goalkeeper for Swiss Super League club Servette and the Lithuania national team.

== Career statistics ==
=== Club ===
As of match played 8 August 2026

Appearances and goals by club, season and competition
Club	Season	League			National cup (Note: Includes Lithuanian Cup, Cupa României)		League cup		Continental		Other		Total	
Club	Season	Division	Apps	Goals	Apps	Goals	Apps	Goals	Apps	Goals	Apps	Goals	Apps	Goals
Tauras Tauragė	2013	A Lyga	12	0	1	0	—		—		—		13	0
Atlantas	2014	A Lyga	9	0	0	0	—		—		—		9	0
Rennes	2015–16	Ligue 1	0	0	0	0	0	0	—		—		0	0
Rennes	2016–17	Ligue 1	0	0	0	0	0	0	—		—		0	0
Rennes	2017–18	Ligue 1	0	0	0	0	0	0	—		—		0	0
Rennes	2018–19	Ligue 1	0	0	0	0	0	0	0	0	—		0	0
Rennes	Total		0	0	0	0	0	0	0	0	—		0	0
Atlantas (loan)	2015	A Lyga	15	0	1	0	—		—		—		16	0
Rennes B	2016–17	CFA	19	0	—		—		—		—		19	0
Rennes B	2017–18	National 2	22	0	—		—		—		—		22	0
Rennes B	2018–19	National 3	7	0	—		—		—		—		7	0
Rennes B	Total		48	0	—		—		—		—		48	0
Žalgiris	2020	A Lyga	6	0	0	0	—		0	0	0	0	6	0
Žalgiris	2021	A Lyga	23	0	3	0	—		8 (Note: Four appearances in UEFA Champions League, two appearances in UEFA Europa League, two appearances in UEFA Europa Conference League)	0	1 (Note: Appearance in Lithuanian Supercup)	0	35	0
Žalgiris	2022	A Lyga	23	0	4	0	—		14 (Note: Six appearances in UEFA Champions League, two appearances in UEFA Europa League, six appearances in UEFA Europa Conference League)	0	1	0	42	0
Žalgiris	2023	A Lyga	25	0	0	0	—		8 (Note: Four appearances in UEFA Champions League, two appearances in UEFA Europa League, two appearances in UEFA Europa Conference League)	0	0	0	33	0
Žalgiris	Total		77	0	7	0	—		30	0	2	0	116	0
Universitatea Cluj	2023–24	Liga I	7	0	2	0	—		—		2 (Note: Appearances in Liga I European play-offs)	0	11	0
Universitatea Cluj	2024–25	Liga I	35	0	0	0	—		—		—		35	0
Universitatea Cluj	2025–26	Liga I	24	0	2	0	—		2 (Note: Appearances in UEFA Conference League)	0	—		28	0
Universitatea Cluj	Total		66	0	4	0	—		2	0	2	0	74	0
Servette	2026–27	Swiss Super League	2	0	0	0	—		—		—		2	0
Career total			229	0	13	0	0	0	32	0	4	0	278	0

=== International ===
As of match played 29 March 2026

Appearances and goals by national team and year
National team	Year	Apps	Goals
Lithuania
Lithuania	2015	1	0
Lithuania	2021	1	0
Lithuania	2022	2	0
Lithuania	2023	5	0
Lithuania	2024	7	0
Lithuania	2025	7	0
Lithuania	2025	2	0
Total		25	0

== Honours ==
Atlantas

- Lithuanian Cup runner-up: 2014–15

Rennes

- Coupe de France: 2018–19
- Trophée des Champions runner-up: 2019

Žalgiris

- A Lyga: 2020, 2021, 2022
- Lithuanian Cup: 2021, 2022
- Lithuanian Supercup: 2020, 2023

Universitatea Cluj

- Cupa României runner-up: 2025–26

=== Individual ===
- Lithuanian Footballer of the Year: 2022
- Žalgiris Player of the Year: 2022, 2023
- Liga I Team of the Season: 2025–26
