= Ion Oblemenco Stadium =

Football stadium in Craiova, Romania

- Interactive map of Ion Oblemenco Stadium
- Address: 36 Boulevard Știrbei Vodă
- Location: Craiova, Romania
- Coordinates: 44°18′50″N 23°47′03″E
- Owner: Municipality of Craiova
- Operator: Universitatea Craiova
- Capacity: 30,983
- Surface: Grass
- Field size: 105 m × 68 m (115 yd × 74 yd)

Construction
- Groundbreaking: 7 September 2015
- Built: 2015–2017
- Opened: 10 November 2017
- Cost: €52 million (€58 million in 2021 euros)
- Architect: Dico și Țigănaș

Tenants
- CS Universitatea Craiova (2017–present); Romania national football team (2018); FC U Craiova (2021–2024)

The Ion Oblemenco Stadium is a football stadium in Craiova, Romania. The all-seater stadium opened in 2017 and has a capacity of 30,983, the fourth largest football ground in Romania. It is in the immediate vicinity of the new Sala Polivalentă. The ground is named after Ion Oblemenco (1945–1996), a legendary player and coach of Universitatea Craiova.

The stadium ranked fourth overall among stadiums in the world opened in 2017 surpassing expectations, ranking higher than Wanda Metropolitano and Gazprom Arena. On 26 February, 2018, the Stadionul Ion Oblemenco was selected as a finalist from 27 submissions by the jury. Architects generally agreed that the outcome was satisfying, with decent investment results.

== History ==
Construction began on September 7, 2015. The older stadium was demolished in the same year. On 26 April, 2017, the construction reached its final phase, with seats being installed.

To celebrate the opening of the stadium, Universitatea Craiova played a friendly on 10 November, 2017 against the Czech side Slavia Prague. A crowd of 30,000 people attended.

The stadium officially opened with a ceremony on 18 November, 2017 before its first competitive senior game, the Liga I match against Juventus București. The match was won by Universitatea Craiova 3–1, with Alexandru Mitriță scoring the first ever official goal at the new stadium.

== Events ==
=== International football games ===
International football matches
Date	Competition	Home	Away	Score	Attendance
27 March 2018	Friendly	Romania	Sweden	1–0	20,000
16 August 2018	UEFA Europa League 3QR	(Romania) Universitatea Craiova	(Germany) RB Leipzig	1–1	12,050
18 July 2019	UEFA Europa League 1QR	(Romania) Universitatea Craiova	(Azerbaijan) Sabail FK	3–2	15,763
1 August 2019	UEFA Europa League 2QR	(Romania) Universitatea Craiova	(Hungary) Budapest Honvéd	0–0	22,134
8 August 2019	UEFA Europa League 3QR	(Romania) Universitatea Craiova	(Greece) AEK Athens	0–2	2,530 (Note: Only children were allowed.)
29 July 2021	UEFA Europa Conference League 2QR	(Romania) Universitatea Craiova	(Albania) KF Laçi	0–0	0 (Note: COVID-19 pandemic regulations)
28 July 2022	UEFA Europa Conference League 2QR	(Romania) Universitatea Craiova	(Albania) Vllaznia	3–0	12,324
11 August 2022	UEFA Europa Conference League 3QR	(Romania) Universitatea Craiova	(Ukraine) Zorya Luhansk	3–0	15,079
1 August 2024	UEFA Europa Conference League 2QR	(Romania) Universitatea Craiova	(Slovenia) Maribor	3–2	18,620
31 July 2025	UEFA Europa Conference League 2QR	(Romania) Universitatea Craiova	(Bosnia and Herzegovina) Sarajevo	4–0	19,624
7 August 2025	UEFA Europa Conference League 3QR	(Romania) Universitatea Craiova	(Slovakia) Spartak Trnava	3–0	22,664
28 August 2025	UEFA Europa Conference League Play-Off	(Romania) Universitatea Craiova	(Turkey) İstanbul Başakşehir	3–0	27,884
23 October 2025	UEFA Europa Conference League League Phase	(Romania) Universitatea Craiova	(Armenia) Noah	1–1	18,004
27 November 2025	UEFA Europa Conference League League Phase	(Romania) Universitatea Craiova	(Germany) Mainz 05	1–0	24,284
11 December 2025	UEFA Conference League League Phase	(Romania) Universitatea Craiova	(Czech Republic) Sparta Prague	1–2	20,210
29 July 2026	UEFA Champions League 2QR	(Romania) Universitatea Craiova	(Bulgaria) Levski Sofia	2–2	27,037

== Gallery ==
External view of the stadium

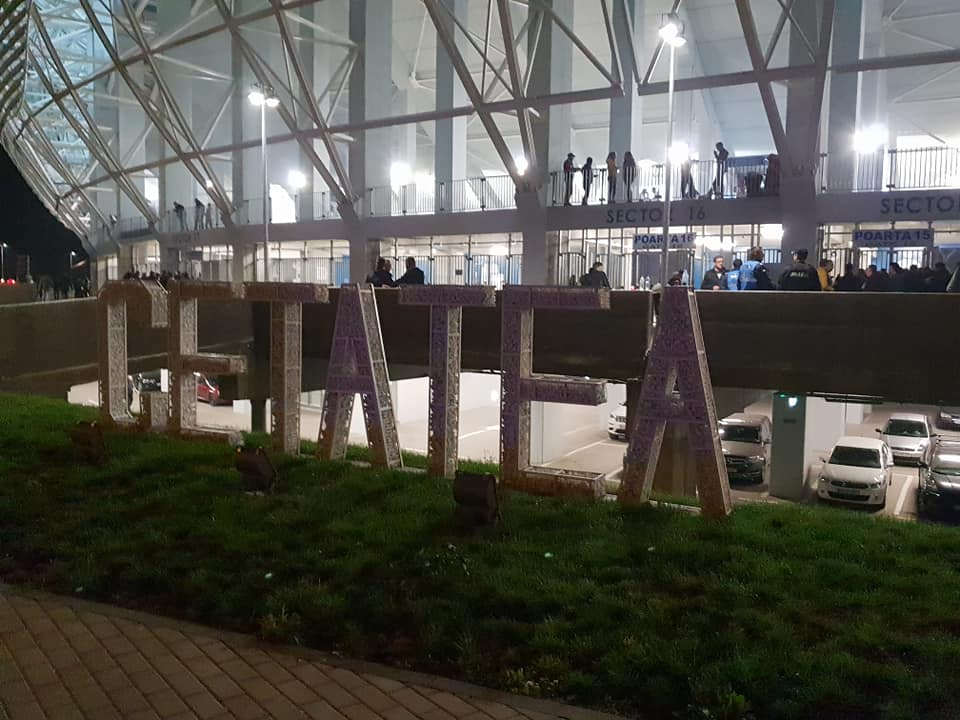
Ion Oblemenco Stadium parking lots

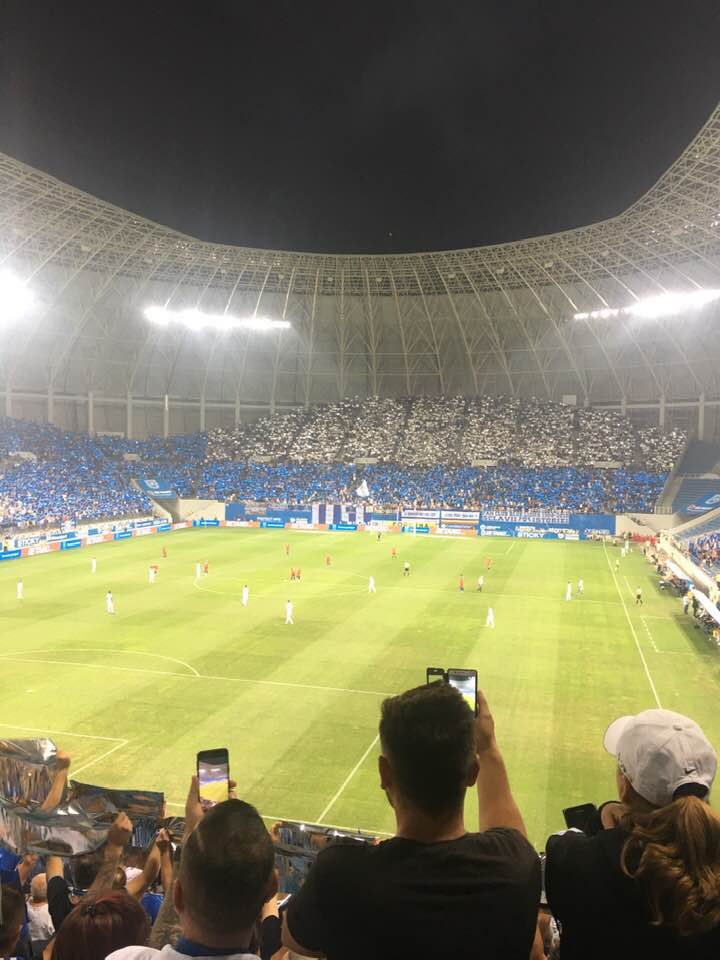
Fan choreography stadium overview

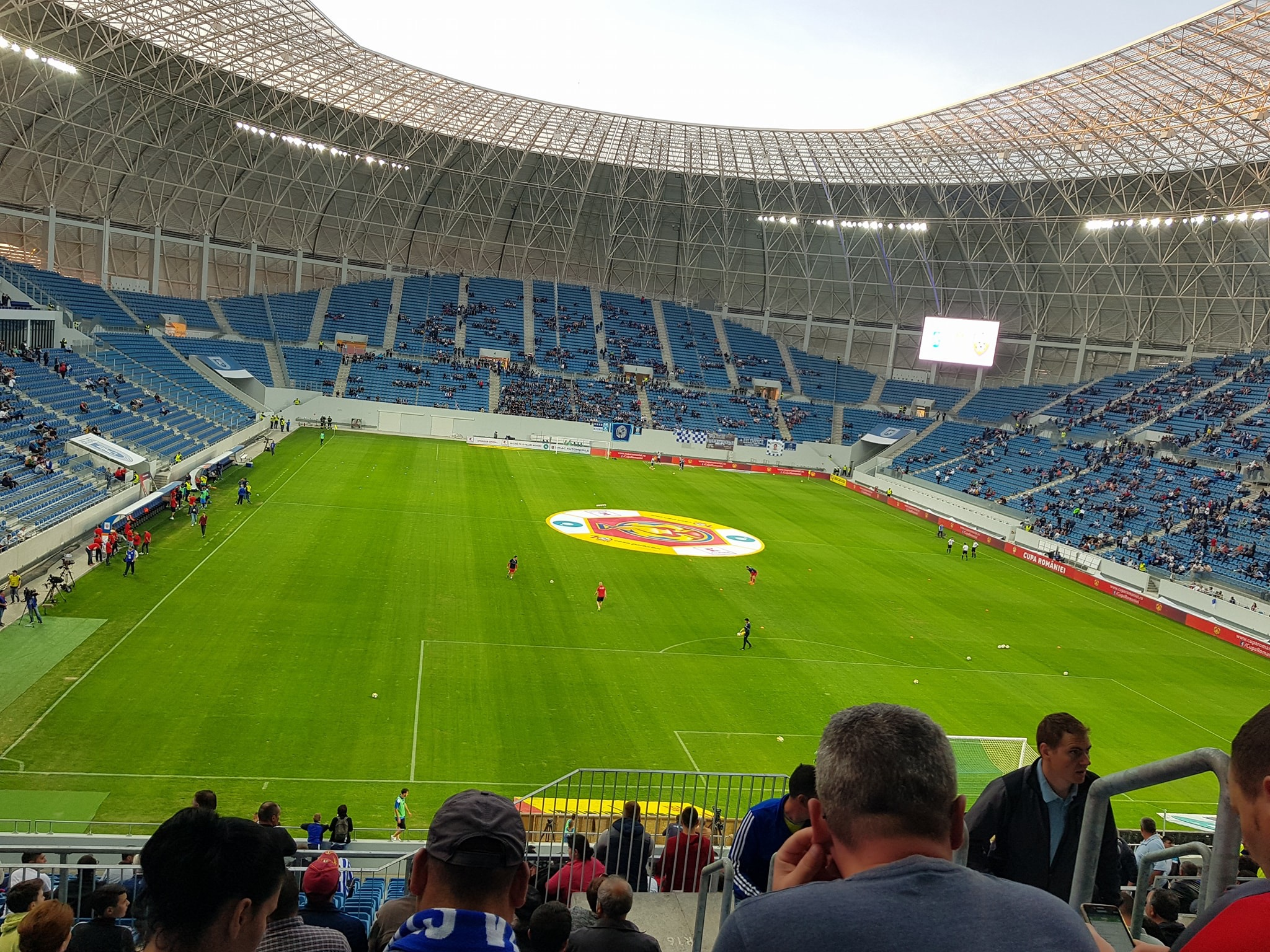
Internal view of the stadium

== See also ==
- List of football stadiums in Romania
- List of European stadia by capacity
