= Atanas Trică =

Romanian professional footballer

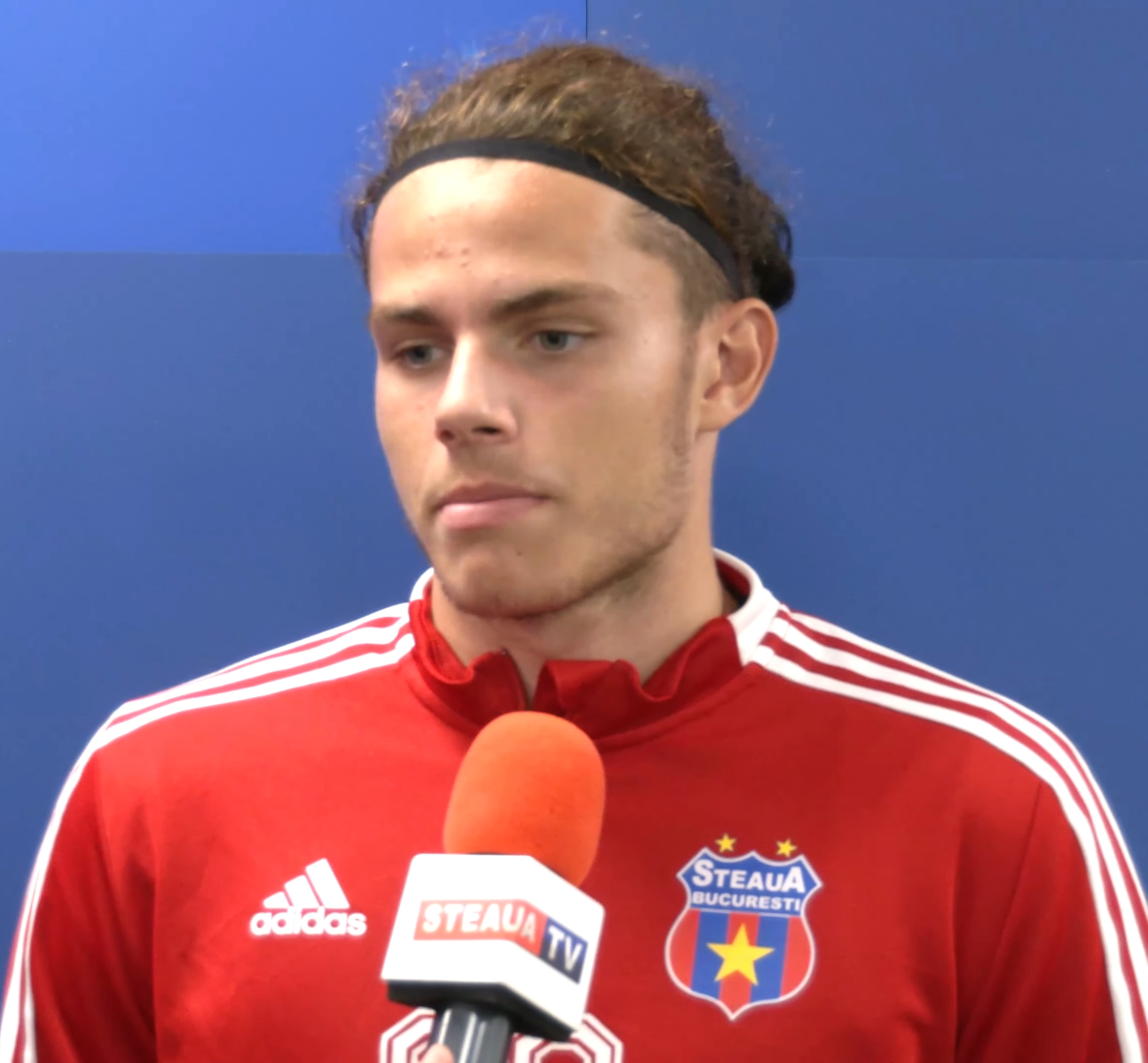
- Atanas Trică in 2022

Personal information
- Full name: Atanas Ioan Trică
- Date of birth: 9 July 2004 (age 22)
- Place of birth: Bucharest, Romania
- Height: 1.91 m (6 ft 3 in)
- Position: Forward

Team information
- Current team: AEK Larnaca
- Number: 19

Youth career
- 2012–2021: Daco-Getica București
- 2021–2022: Universitatea Craiova

Senior career*
Years	Team	Apps	(Gls)
2021–2024	Universitatea Craiova	8	(1)
2022–2023	→ CSA Steaua București (loan)	19	(3)
2023–2024	→ Tunari (loan)	9	(1)
2024–2025	CSM Slatina	21	(2)
2025–2026	Universitatea Cluj	26	(1)
2026–	AEK Larnaca	5	(2)

International career^{‡}
2022	Romania U18	3	(0)
2022–2023	Romania U19	8	(1)
2023–2025	Romania U20	13	(4)
2025–2026	Romania U21	11	(2)
- * Club domestic league appearances and goals as of 7 November 2026 ‡ National team caps and goals as of 6 October 2026

Atanas Ioan Trică (born 9 July 2004) is a Romanian professional footballer who plays as a forward for Cypriot First Division club AEK Larnaca.

== Club career ==
Trică scored his first goal for Universitatea Craiova on 10 February 2022, in a 6–1 Liga I win over Dinamo București.

== Personal life ==
Atanas father, Eugen, and maternal grandfather, Ilie Balaci, were also professional footballers.

== Career statistics ==
As of match played 18 September 2026

Appearances and goals by club, season and competition
Club	Season	League			Cupa României		Europe		Other		Total	
Club	Season	Division	Apps	Goals	Apps	Goals	Apps	Goals	Apps	Goals	Apps	Goals
Universitatea Craiova	2020–21	Liga I	1	0	0	0	—		—		1	0
Universitatea Craiova	2021–22	Liga I	3	1	0	0	0	0	0	0	3	1
Universitatea Craiova	2023–24	Liga I	4	0	3	1	—		—		7	1
Universitatea Craiova	Total		8	1	3	1	0	0	0	0	11	2
CSA Steaua București (loan)	2022–23	Liga II	18	3	0	0	—		—		18	3
Tunari (loan)	2023–24	Liga II	9	1	—		—		—		9	1
CSM Slatina	2024–25	Liga II	21	2	2	1	—		—		23	3
Universitatea Cluj	2025–26	Liga I	25	1	3	2	2 (Note: Appearances in UEFA Conference League)	0	—		30	3
Universitatea Cluj	2026–27	Liga I	1	0	—		0	0	1 (Note: Appearance in Supercupa României)	0	2	0
Universitatea Cluj	Total		26	1	3	2	2	0	1	0	32	3
AEK Larnaca	2026–27	Cypriot First Division	2	0	0	0	—		—		2	0
Career total			84	8	8	4	2	0	1	0	95	12

== Honours ==
Universitatea Craiova

- Cupa României: 2020–21

Universitatea Cluj

- Cupa României runner-up: 2025–26
- Supercupa României runner-up: 2026
