= Dorin Codrea =

Romanian footballer

Personal information
- Full name: Dorin Marian Codrea
- Date of birth: 13 June 1997 (age 29)
- Place of birth: Timișoara, Romania
- Height: 1.85 m (6 ft 1 in)
- Positions: Defensive midfielder; centre-back

Team information
- Current team: Universitatea Cluj
- Number: 8

Youth career
- 2004–2013: LPS Banatul Timișoara

Senior career*
Years	Team	Apps	(Gls)
2013–2016	ASU Politehnica Timișoara		
2016–2018	Millennium Giarmata		
2018–2021	ACS Poli Timișoara	28	(2)
2019	→ Dumbrăvița (loan)		
2020–2021	→ ASU Politehnica Timișoara (loan)	28	(3)
2021–2024	Concordia Chiajna	67	(3)
2024–	Universitatea Cluj	70	(3)
- * Club domestic league appearances and goals as of 23 October 2026

Dorin Marian Codrea (born 13 June 1997) is a Romanian professional footballer who plays as a defensive midfielder or a centre-back for Liga I club Universitatea Cluj.

== Club career ==
Codrea made his professional debut at the age of 16 for ASU Politehnica Timișoara in Liga IV. After five seasons in lower leagues, he signed in the summer of 2018 with Liga II club ACS Poli Timișoara. He was loaned at Dumbrăvița and later at ASU Politehnica Timișoara. In the summer of 2021 he signed a contract with Concordia Chiajna. He was signed by Liga I club Universitatea Cluj in May 2024. He made his Liga I debut for Șepcile roșii in a match against FCSB on 13 July 2024.

== Career statistics ==
=== Club ===
As of match played 28 October 2026

Club	Season	League			Cupa României		Europe		Other		Total	
Club	Season	Division	Apps	Goals	Apps	Goals	Apps	Goals	Apps	Goals	Apps	Goals
ASU Politehnica Timișoara	2013–14	Liga IV	?	?	?	?	–		–		?	?
ASU Politehnica Timișoara	2014–15	Liga IV	?	?	?	?	–		–		?	?
ASU Politehnica Timișoara	2015–16	Liga III	?	?	?	?	–		–		?	?
ASU Politehnica Timișoara	Total		?	?	?	?	–		–		?	?
Millennium Giarmata	2016–17	Liga III	?	?	?	?	–		–		?	?
Millennium Giarmata	2017–18	Liga III	?	?	?	?	–		–		?	?
Millennium Giarmata	Total		?	?	?	?	–		–		?	?
ACS Poli Timișoara	2018–19	Liga II	28	2	0	0	–		–		28	2
Dumbrăvița (loan)	2019–20	Liga III	?	?	?	?	–		–		?	?
ASU Politehnica Timișoara (loan)	2019–20	Liga II	2	0	–		–		–		2	0
ASU Politehnica Timișoara (loan)	2020–21	Liga II	26	3	2	0	–		–		28	3
ASU Politehnica Timișoara (loan)	Total		28	3	2	0	–		–		30	3
Concordia Chiajna	2021–22	Liga II	28	1	1	0	–		2 (Note: Appearances in Liga I promotion/relegation play-offs)	0	31	1
Concordia Chiajna	2022–23	Liga II	22	0	2	0	–		–		24	0
Concordia Chiajna	2023–24	Liga II	17	3	0	0	–		–		17	3
Concordia Chiajna	Total		67	4	3	0	–		2	0	72	4
Universitatea Cluj	2024–25	Liga I	28	1	1	0	–		–		29	1
Universitatea Cluj	2025–26	Liga I	32	1	5	0	2 (Note: Appearances in UEFA Conference League)	0	–		39	1
Universitatea Cluj	2026–27	Liga I	10	1	1	0	4 (Note: Two appearances in UEFA Europa League, two appearances in UEFA Conference League)	0	1 (Note: Appearance in Supercupa României)	0	16	1
Universitatea Cluj	Total		70	3	7	0	6	0	1	0	84	3
Career total			193	12	12	0	6	0	3	0	214	12

== Personal life ==
He is the cousin of Romanian former international player Paul Codrea.

== Honours ==
ASU Politehnica Timișoara

- Liga III: 2015–16
- Liga IV – Timiș County: 2014–15

Universitatea Cluj

- Cupa României runner-up: 2025–26
- Supercupa României runner-up: 2026
