= Gabriel Simion =

Romanian footballer

Personal information
- Full name: Gabriel Bogdan Simion
- Date of birth: 22 May 1998 (age 28)
- Place of birth: Călărași, Romania
- Height: 1.80 m (5 ft 11 in)
- Position: Midfielder

Team information
- Current team: Maccabi Netanya (on loan from Universitatea Cluj)
- Number: 98

Youth career
- –2010: Dunărea Călărași
- 2010–2016: Steaua București

Senior career*
Years	Team	Apps	(Gls)
2016–2022	FCSB	19	(0)
2017	→ Academica Clinceni (loan)	18	(1)
2018	→ Juventus București (loan)	10	(0)
2018–2019	→ Dunărea Călărași (loan)	27	(0)
2019–2020	→ Astra Giurgiu (loan)	29	(0)
2021–2022	→ Aris Limassol (loan)	24	(0)
2022–	Universitatea Cluj	111	(0)
2026–	→ Maccabi Netanya (loan)	1	(0)
- * Club domestic league appearances and goals as of 10 October 2026

Gabriel Bogdan Simion (born 22 May 1998) is a Romanian professional footballer who plays as a midfielder for Israeli Premier League club Maccabi Netanya, on loan from Liga I club Universitatea Cluj.

== Career statistics ==
As of 10 October 2026

Appearances and goals by club, season and competition
Club	Season	League			National cup (Note: Includes Cupa României, Cypriot Cup)		Cupa Ligii		Europe		Other		Total	
Club	Season	Division	Apps	Goals	Apps	Goals	Apps	Goals	Apps	Goals	Apps	Goals	Apps	Goals
FCSB	2016–17	Liga I	0	0	0	0	1	0	0	0	—		1	0
FCSB	2020–21	Liga I	19	0	0	0	—		2 (Note: Appearances in UEFA Europa League)	0	1 (Note: Appearance in Supercupa României)	0	22	0
FCSB	Total		19	0	0	0	1	0	2	0	1	0	23	0
Academica Clinceni (loan)	2017–18	Liga II	18	1	1	0	—		—		—		19	1
Juventus București (loan)	2017–18	Liga I	10	0	0	0	—		—		—		10	0
Dunărea Călărași (loan)	2018–19	Liga I	27	0	2	0	—		—		—		29	0
Astra Giurgiu (loan)	2019–20	Liga I	29	0	0	0	—		—		—		29	0
FCSB II	2020–21	Liga III	2	0	—		—		—		—		2	0
Aris Limassol (loan)	2021–22	Cypriot First Division	24	0	1	0	—		—		—		25	0
Universitatea Cluj	2022–23	Liga I	25	0	7	0	—		—		—		32	0
Universitatea Cluj	2023–24	Liga I	28	0	5	0	—		—		2 (Note: Appearances in Liga I European play-offs)	0	35	0
Universitatea Cluj	2024–25	Liga I	33	0	1	0	—		—		—		34	0
Universitatea Cluj	2025–26	Liga I	23	0	2	0	—		2 (Note: Appearances in UEFA Conference League)	0	—		27	0
Universitatea Cluj	2026–27	Liga I	2	0	1	0	—		1	0	1	0	5	0
Universitatea Cluj	Total		111	0	16	0	—		3	0	3	0	133	0
Maccabi Netanya (loan)	2026–27	Israeli Premier League	1	0	0	0	—		—		—		1	0
Career total			241	1	20	0	1	0	5	0	4	0	271	1

== Honours ==
FCSB

- Cupa Ligii: 2015–16
- Supercupa României runner-up: 2020

Universitatea Cluj

- Cupa României runner-up: 2022–23, 2025–26
- Supercupa României runner-up: 2026
