= Iulian Cristea =

Romanian footballer (born 1994)

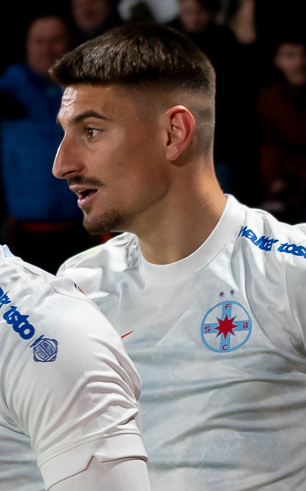
- Cristea with FCSB in 2022

Personal information
- Full name: Lucian Iulian Cristea
- Date of birth: 17 July 1994 (age 32)
- Place of birth: Mediaș, Romania
- Height: 1.84 m (6 ft 0 in)
- Positions: Centre-back; defensive midfielder

Team information
- Current team: Universitatea Cluj
- Number: 6

Youth career
- 2007–2013: Gaz Metan Mediaș

Senior career*
Years	Team	Apps	(Gls)
2014–2019	Gaz Metan Mediaș	109	(6)
2014	→ Metalurgistul Cugir (loan)		
2019–2023	FCSB	120	(8)
2023–2024	Rapid București	14	(0)
2024–	Universitatea Cluj	81	(3)

International career^{‡}
2014–2016	Romania U21	6	(0)
2019–2022	Romania	4	(0)
- * Club domestic league appearances and goals as of 7 November 2026 ‡ National team caps and goals as of 4 June 2022

Lucian Iulian Cristea (Romanian pronunciation: [lutʃiˈan juliˈan ˈkriste̯a]; born 17 July 1994) is a Romanian professional footballer who plays as a centre-back or a defensive midfielder for Liga I club Universitatea Cluj.

== Club career ==
After playing over 110 matches in all competitions for his hometown club Gaz Metan Mediaș, Cristea moved to fellow Liga I team FCSB on 26 February 2019. He signed a five-year contract for a €150,000 transfer fee.

On 13 June 2023, after being released by FCSB, Cristea moved to cross-town rivals Rapid București on a two-year deal. He terminated his agreement with Rapid București on 31 May 2024, and on 5 June Universitatea Cluj announced the signing of Cristea as a free agent.

== International career ==
On 10 June 2019, Cristea made his debut for the Romania national team in a 4–0 win against Malta counting for the UEFA Euro 2020 qualifiers.

== Style of play ==
Cristea has been described as versatile, due to his ability to play equally well as either a centre-back or a defensive midfielder, and has been noted for his aerial prowess.

== Career statistics ==
=== Club ===
As of match played 7 November 2026

Appearances and goals by club, season and competition
Club	Season	League			Cupa României		Cupa Ligii		Europe		Other		Total	
Club	Season	Division	Apps	Goals	Apps	Goals	Apps	Goals	Apps	Goals	Apps	Goals	Apps	Goals
Gaz Metan Mediaș	2014–15	Liga I	15	0	1	0	0	0	—		—		16	0
Gaz Metan Mediaș	2015–16	Liga II	22	1	0	0	—		—		—		22	1
Gaz Metan Mediaș	2016–17	Liga I	28	1	1	0	0	0	—		—		29	1
Gaz Metan Mediaș	2017–18	Liga I	21	1	5	0	—		—		—		26	1
Gaz Metan Mediaș	2018–19	Liga I	23	3	1	0	—		—		—		24	3
Gaz Metan Mediaș	Total		109	6	8	0	—		—		—		117	6
FCSB	2018–19	Liga I	10	1	—		—		—		—		10	1
FCSB	2019–20	Liga I	28	1	3	0	—		7 (Note: Appearance(s) in UEFA Europa League)	1	—		38	2
FCSB	2020–21	Liga I	35	4	0	0	—		1	0	0	0	36	4
FCSB	2021–22	Liga I	33	2	1	0	—		1 (Note: Appearance(s) in UEFA Conference League)	0	—		35	2
FCSB	2022–23	Liga I	14	0	0	0	—		0	0	—		14	0
FCSB	Total		120	8	4	0	—		9	1	0	0	133	9
Rapid București	2023–24	Liga I	14	0	2	1	—		—		—		16	1
Universitatea Cluj	2024–25	Liga I	32	2	0	0	—		—		—		32	2
Universitatea Cluj	2025–26	Liga I	34	1	3	0	—		2	0	—		39	1
Universitatea Cluj	2026–27	Liga I	15	0	2	0	—		4 (Note: Two appearances in UEFA Europa League, two appearances in UEFA Conference League)	0	1 (Note: Appearance in Supercupa României)	0	22	0
Universitatea Cluj	Total		81	3	5	0	—		6	0	1	0	93	3
Career total			324	17	19	1	0	0	15	1	1	0	359	19

=== International ===
As of match played 4 June 2022

National team	Year	Apps	Goals
Romania
Romania	2019	1	0
Romania	2020	2	0
Romania	2022	1	0
Total		4	0

== Honours ==
Gaz Metan Mediaș

- Liga II: 2015–16

FCSB

- Cupa României: 2019–20
- Supercupa României runner-up: 2020

Universitatea Cluj

- Cupa României runner-up: 2025–26
- Supercupa României runner-up: 2026

Individual

- Liga I Team of the Season: 2021–22
- Liga I Team of the Championship Play-Offs: 2018–19
