= Oucasse Mendy =

French footballer (born 2001)

Personal information
- Full name: Oucasse N'Dayanthane Mendy
- Date of birth: 1 June 2001 (age 25)
- Place of birth: Marseille, France
- Height: 1.82 m (6 ft 0 in)
- Position: Winger

Team information
- Current team: Universitatea Cluj
- Number: 29

Youth career
- Marseille
- –2019: SC Air Bel
- 2019–2020: Montpellier

Senior career*
Years	Team	Apps	(Gls)
2019–2021	Montpellier B	22	(3)
2022	Marignane GCB	6	(0)
2023–2025	Martigues	46	(5)
2025–2026	RAAL La Louvière	17	(1)
2026–	Universitatea Cluj	27	(8)
- * Club domestic league appearances and goals as of 2 November 2026

Oucasse N'Dayanthane Mendy (born 1 June 2001) is a French professional footballer who plays as a winger for Liga I club Universitatea Cluj.

== Personal life ==
Oucasse's brother, Antoine, is also a footballer, currently playing as right-back for Ligue 1 club Nice and the Senegal national team.

== Career statistics ==
As of match played 2 November 2026

Appearances and goals by club, season and competition
Club	Season	League			National cup (Note: Includes Coupe de France, Cupa României)		Europe		Other		Total	
Club	Season	Division	Apps	Goals	Apps	Goals	Apps	Goals	Apps	Goals	Apps	Goals
Montpellier B	2019–20	Championnat National 2	12	0	—		—		—		12	0
Montpellier B	2020–21	Championnat National 3	2	1	—		—		—		2	1
Montpellier B	2021–22	Championnat National 2	8	2	—		—		—		8	2
Montpellier B	Total		22	3	—		—		—		22	3
Marignane GCB	2021–22	Championnat National 2	6	0	—		—		—		6	0
Martigues	2023–24	Championnat National	17	0	2	0	—		—		19	0
Martigues	2024–25	Ligue 2	29	5	3	1	—		—		32	6
Martigues	Total		46	5	5	1	—		—		51	6
RAAL La Louvière	2025–26	Belgian Pro League	17	1	0	0	—		—		17	1
Universitatea Cluj	2025–26	Liga I	15	5	4	2	—		—		19	7
Universitatea Cluj	2026–27	Liga I	12	2	2	0	3 (Note: Two appearances in UEFA Europa League, one appearance in UEFA Conference League)	0	0	0	17	2
Universitatea Cluj	Total		27	7	6	2	3	0	0	0	36	3
Career total			118	16	11	3	3	0	0	0	132	19

== Honours ==
Universitatea Cluj

- Cupa României runner-up: 2025–26
- Supercupa României runner-up: 2026
