= Ștefan Lefter =

Romanian footballer

Personal information
- Full name: Ștefan Daniel Lefter
- Date of birth: 18 November 2004 (age 22)
- Place of birth: Iași, Romania
- Height: 1.87 m (6 ft 2 in)
- Position: Goalkeeper

Team information
- Current team: Universitatea Cluj
- Number: 1

Youth career
- LPS Iași
- –2020: Rapid București

Senior career*
| Years | Team | Apps | (Gls) |
| 2020–2023 | Rapid București | 0 | (0) |
| 2020–2023 | → Corvinul Hunedoara (Note: The statistics for the 2020–21 Liga III, 2021–22 Liga III, 2022–23 Liga III seasons are unavailable.) (loan) | | |
| 2023–2024 | Corvinul Hunedoara | 34 | (0) |
| 2025– | Universitatea Cluj | 32 | (0) |

International career^{‡}
| 2022 | Romania U18 | 1 | (0) |
| 2023–2025 | Romania U20 | 6 | (0) |
| 2025–2026 | Romania U21 | 9 | (0) |
- * Club domestic league appearances and goals as of 7 November 2026 ‡ National team caps and goals as of 30 September 2026

Ștefan Daniel Lefter (born 18 November 2004) is a Romanian professional footballer who plays as a goalkeeper for Liga I club Universitatea Cluj.

== Career statistics ==
=== Club ===
As of match played 7 November 2026

| Club | Season | League | | | Cupa României | | Europe | | Other | | Total | |
| Club | Season | Division | Apps | Goals | Apps | Goals | Apps | Goals | Apps | Goals | Apps | Goals |
|---|---|---|---|---|---|---|---|---|---|---|---|---|
| Corvinul Hunedoara (loan) | 2020–21 | Liga III | ? | ? | ? | ? | – | | – | | ? | ? |
| Corvinul Hunedoara (loan) | 2021–22 | Liga III | ? | ? | 4 | 0 | – | | 4 (Note: Appearances in Liga III promotion play-offs) | 0 | 8 | 0 |
| Corvinul Hunedoara (loan) | 2022–23 | Liga III | ? | ? | 1 | 0 | – | | 4 | 0 | 5 | 0 |
| Corvinul Hunedoara | 2023–24 | Liga II | 19 | 0 | 6 | 0 | – | | – | | 25 | 0 |
| Corvinul Hunedoara | 2024–25 | Liga II | 15 | 0 | 2 | 0 | 6 (Note: Four appearances in UEFA Europa League, two appearances in UEFA Conference League) | 0 | 1 (Note: Appearances in Supercupa României) | 0 | 24 | 0 |
| Corvinul Hunedoara | Total | | 34 | 0 | 13 | 0 | 6 | 0 | 9 | 0 | 62 | 0 |
| Universitatea Cluj | 2024–25 | Liga I | 5 | 0 | – | | – | | – | | 5 | 0 |
| Universitatea Cluj | 2025–26 | Liga I | 13 | 0 | 4 | 0 | 0 | 0 | – | | 17 | 0 |
| Universitatea Cluj | 2026–27 | Liga I | 14 | 0 | 2 | 0 | 0 | 0 | 1 | 0 | 17 | 0 |
| Universitatea Cluj | Total | | 32 | 0 | 6 | 0 | 0 | 0 | 1 | 0 | 39 | 0 |
| Career total | | | 66 | 0 | 19 | 0 | 6 | 0 | 10 | 0 | 101 | 0 |

== Honours ==
Corvinul Hunedoara

- Liga III: 2021–22, 2022–23
- Cupa României: 2023–24
- Supercupa României runner-up: 2024

Universitatea Cluj

- Cupa României runner-up: 2025–26
- Supercupa României runner-up: 2026
