= Mouhamadou Drammeh =

Gambian footballer (born 1999)

Personal information
- Full name: Mouhamadou Basirou Drammeh
- Date of birth: 15 May 1999 (age 27)
- Place of birth: Paris, France
- Height: 1.88 m (6 ft 2 in)
- Positions: Defensive midfielder; centre-back

Team information
- Current team: Universitatea Cluj
- Number: 7

Youth career
- 2013–2017: Reims

Senior career*
Years	Team	Apps	(Gls)
2017–2021	Reims B	35	(6)
2020–2021	Reims	6	(0)
2021–2023	Vejle	54	(6)
2023–2025	Sochaux	23	(0)
2024–2025	Sochaux B	5	(0)
2025–	Universitatea Cluj	37	(8)

International career^{‡}
2025–	Gambia	8	(0)
- * Club domestic league appearances and goals as of 19 October 2026 ‡ National team caps and goals as of 29 September 2026

Mouhamadou Basirou Drammeh (born 15 May 1999) is a professional footballer who plays as defensive midfielder or a centre-back for Liga I club Universitatea Cluj. Born in France, he plays for the Gambia national team.

== Career ==
Drammeh debuted with Reims in a 3–1 Ligue 1 loss to Lorient on 17 October 2020.

== International career ==
Born in France, Drammeh is of Gambian descent. In May 2025, he was called up to the Gambia national team for a set of friendlies.

== Career statistics ==
=== Club ===
As of match played 19 October 2026

Appearances and goals by club, season and competition
Club	Season	League			National cup (Note: Includes Coupe de France, Danish Cup, Cupa României)		Europe		Other		Total	
Club	Season	Division	Apps	Goals	Apps	Goals	Apps	Goals	Apps	Goals	Apps	Goals
Reims B	2016–17	CFA	1	0	—		—		—		1	0
Reims B	2017–18	Championnat National 2	14	4	—		—		—		14	4
Reims B	2018–19	Championnat National 2	3	0	—		—		—		3	0
Reims B	2019–20	Championnat National 2	8	1	—		—		—		8	1
Reims B	2020–21	Championnat National 2	9	1	—		—		—		9	1
Reims B	Total		35	6	—		—		—		35	6
Reims	2020–21	Ligue 1	6	0	1	0	—		—		7	0
Vejle	2021–22	Danish Superliga	21	1	5	0	—		—		26	1
Vejle	2022–23	Danish 1st Division	30	5	4	1	—		—		34	6
Vejle	2023–24	Danish Superliga	3	0	—		—		—		3	0
Vejle	Total		54	6	9	1	—		—		63	7
Sochaux	2023–24	Championnat National	3	0	1	0	—		—		4	0
Sochaux	2024–25	Championnat National	20	0	4	0	—		—		24	0
Sochaux	Total		23	0	5	0	—		—		28	0
Sochaux B	2023–24	Championnat National 3	2	0	—		—		—		2	0
Sochaux B	2024–25	Championnat National 3	3	0	—		—		—		3	0
Sochaux B	Total		5	0	—		—		—		5	0
Universitatea Cluj	2025–26	Liga I	26	5	4	0	2 (Note: Appearances in UEFA Conference League)	0	—		32	5
Universitatea Cluj	2026–27	Liga I	11	3	1	0	4 (Note: Two appearances in UEFA Europa League, two appearances in UEFA Conference League)	0	1 (Note: Appearance in Supercupa României)	0	17	3
Universitatea Cluj	Total		37	8	5	0	6	0	1	0	49	8
Career total			160	20	20	1	6	0	1	0	187	21

=== International ===
As of match played 29 September 2026

Appearances and goals by national team and year
National team	Year	Apps	Goals
Gambia	2025	5	0
Gambia	2026	3	0
Total		8	0

== Honours ==
Vejle

- Danish 1st Division: 2022–23

Universitatea Cluj

- Cupa României runner-up: 2025–26
- Supercupa României runner-up: 2026
