= Ovidiu Bic =

Romanian footballer (born 1994)

Personal information
- Full name: Ovidiu Alexandru Bic
- Date of birth: 23 February 1994 (age 32)
- Place of birth: Abrud, Romania
- Height: 1.78 m (5 ft 10 in)
- Position: Midfielder

Team information
- Current team: Universitatea Cluj
- Number: 94

Youth career
- –2011: Liberty Oradea

Senior career*
Years	Team	Apps	(Gls)
2012–2014	Bihor Oradea	50	(4)
2014–2015	Olimpia Satu Mare	22	(1)
2015–2018	Gaz Metan Mediaș	77	(2)
2018–2022	Universitatea Craiova	42	(1)
2019–2020	→ Chindia Târgoviște (loan)	35	(3)
2021–2022	→ Ironi Kiryat Shmona (loan)	16	(0)
2022–	Universitatea Cluj	150	(6)

International career
2012	Romania U19	3	(0)
- * Club domestic league appearances and goals as of 7 November 2026

Ovidiu Alexandru Bic (Romanian pronunciation: [oˈvidju alekˈsandru ˈbik]; born 23 February 1994) is a Romanian professional footballer who plays as a midfielder for Liga I club Universitatea Cluj.

== Club career ==
On 5 January 2018, Bic signed a four-and-a-half-year contract with CS Universitatea Craiova.

== Career statistics ==
=== Club ===
As of match played 7 November 2026

Appearances and goals by club, season and competition
Club	Season	League			National cup (Note: Includes Cupa României, Israel State Cup)		League cup (Note: Includes Cupa Ligii, Toto Cup)		Europe		Other		Total	
Club	Season	Division	Apps	Goals	Apps	Goals	Apps	Goals	Apps	Goals	Apps	Goals	Apps	Goals
Bihor Oradea	2011–12	Liga II	10	3	—		—		—		—		10	3
Bihor Oradea	2012–13	Liga II	14	0	1	0	—		—		—		15	0
Bihor Oradea	2013–14	Liga II	26	1	2	0	—		—		—		28	1
Bihor Oradea	Total		50	4	3	0	—		—		—		53	4
Olimpia Satu Mare	2014–15	Liga II	22	1	0	0	—		—		—		22	1
Gaz Metan Mediaș	2015–16	Liga II	25	1	0	0	—		—		—		25	1
Gaz Metan Mediaș	2016–17	Liga I	32	1	2	2	1	0	—		—		35	3
Gaz Metan Mediaș	2017–18	Liga I	20	0	2	0	—		–		—		22	0
Gaz Metan Mediaș	Total		77	2	4	2	1	0	—		—		82	4
Universitatea Craiova	2017–18	Liga I	2	0	0	0	—		—		—		2	0
Universitatea Craiova	2018–19	Liga I	7	0	3	0	—		0	0	0	0	10	0
Universitatea Craiova	2020–21	Liga I	22	0	5	2	—		0	0	—		27	2
Universitatea Craiova	2021–22	Liga I	11	1	1	0	—		2 (Note: Appearances in UEFA Conference League)	0	1 (Note: Appearance in Liga I play-offs for UEFA Europa Conference League)	0	15	1
Universitatea Craiova	Total		42	1	9	2	—		2	0	1	0	54	3
Chindia Târgoviște (loan)	2019–20	Liga I	35	3	0	0	—		—		2 (Note: Appearances in Liga I promotion/relegation play-offs)	1	37	4
Ironi Kiryat Shmona (loan)	2021–22	Israeli Premier League	16	0	1	0	2	0	—		—		19	0
Universitatea Cluj	2022–23	Liga I	33	2	6	0	—		—		—		39	2
Universitatea Cluj	2023–24	Liga I	32	0	5	0	—		—		2	0	39	0
Universitatea Cluj	2024–25	Liga I	33	2	0	0	—		—		—		33	2
Universitatea Cluj	2025–26	Liga I	37	1	6	0	—		2	0	—		47	1
Universitatea Cluj	2026–27	Liga I	15	1	2	0	—		4 (Note: Two appearances in UEFA Europa League, two appearances in UEFA Conference League)	0	1	0	22	1
Universitatea Cluj	Total		150	6	19	0	—		6	0	3	0	178	6
Career total			392	17	36	4	3	0	8	0	6	1	445	22

== Honours ==
Gaz Metan Mediaș

- Liga II: 2015–16

Universitatea Craiova

- Cupa României: 2017–18, 2020–21
- Supercupa României: 2021

Universitatea Cluj

- Cupa României runner-up: 2022–23, 2025–26
- Supercupa României runner-up: 2026
