= Issouf Macalou =

Ivorian footballer (born 1998)

Personal information
- Date of birth: 27 December 1998 (age 27)
- Place of birth: Abidjan, Ivory Coast
- Height: 1.85 m (6 ft 1 in)
- Position: Forward

Team information
- Current team: Universitatea Cluj
- Number: 19

Youth career
- 2008–2017: AS Meudon

Senior career*
Years	Team	Apps	(Gls)
2017–2019	Sochaux B	46	(11)
2019	Louhans-Cuiseaux	13	(4)
2020–2021	GOAL FC	11	(6)
2021–2023	Valenciennes	13	(1)
2021–2022	→ Le Mans (loan)	31	(5)
2022–2023	→ Red Star (loan)	27	(7)
2023–2025	Sochaux	35	(6)
2023–2024	Sochaux B	3	(4)
2025–	Universitatea Cluj	62	(12)
- * Club domestic league appearances and goals as of 7 November 2026

Issouf Macalou (born 27 December 1998) is an Ivorian professional footballer who plays as a forward for Liga I club Universitatea Cluj.

== Career ==
Macalou began his senior career with the youth academy of Sochaux, before playing for Louhans-Cuiseaux and GOAL FC. On 25 January 2021, Macalou signed a three-year contract with Valenciennes. He made his professional debut with Valenciennes in a 1–0 Ligue 2 win over USL Dunkerque on 30 January 2021.

On 23 July 2021, he moved to Le Mans on loan.

On 7 July 2022, Macalou signed with Red Star. Valenciennes announced that the transfer is a season-long loan with an option to buy.

On 21 January 2025, Macalou moved to Universitatea Cluj in Romania.

== Career statistics ==
As of match played 7 November 2026

Appearances and goals by club, season and competition
Club	Season	League			National cup (Note: Includes Coupe de France, Cupa României)		Europe		Other		Total	
Club	Season	Division	Apps	Goals	Apps	Goals	Apps	Goals	Apps	Goals	Apps	Goals
Sochaux B	2017–18	Championnat National 3	26	8	—		—		—		26	8
Sochaux B	2018–19	Championnat National 3	20	3	—		—		—		20	3
Sochaux B	Total		46	11	—		—		—		46	11
Louhans-Cuiseaux	2019–20	Championnat National 2	13	4	—		—		—		13	4
GOAL FC	2019–20	Championnat National 2	2	0	—		—		—		2	0
GOAL FC	2020–21	Championnat National 2	9	6	1	2	—		—		10	8
GOAL FC	Total		11	6	1	2	—		—		12	8
Valenciennes	2020–21	Ligue 2	12	1	1	0	—		—		13	1
Valenciennes	2023–24	Ligue 2	1	0	—		—		—		1	0
Valenciennes	Total		13	1	1	0	—		—		14	1
Le Mans (loan)	2021–22	Championnat National	31	5	2	4	—		—		33	9
Red Star (loan)	2022–23	Championnat National	27	7	2	0	—		—		29	7
Sochaux	2023–24	Championnat National	25	6	4	1	—		—		29	7
Sochaux	2024–25	Championnat National	10	0	6	4	—		—		16	4
Sochaux	Total		35	6	10	5	—		—		45	11
Sochaux B	2023–24	Championnat National 3	2	2	—		—		—		2	2
Sochaux B	2024–25	Championnat National 3	1	2	—		—		—		1	2
Sochaux B	Total		3	4	—		—		—		3	4
Universitatea Cluj	2024–25	Liga I	10	3	—		—		—		10	3
Universitatea Cluj	2025–26	Liga I	37	6	6	1	2 (Note: Appearances in UEFA Conference League)	0	—		45	7
Universitatea Cluj	2026–27	Liga I	15	3	2	1	4 (Note: Two appearances in UEFA Europa League, two appearances in UEFA Conference League)	0	1 (Note: Appearances in Supercupa României)	0	22	4
Universitatea Cluj	Total		62	12	8	2	6	0	1	0	77	14
Career total			241	56	24	13	6	0	1	0	272	69

== Honours ==
Universitatea Cluj

- Cupa României runner-up: 2025–26
- Supercupa României runner-up: 2026

Individual

- Liga I Team of the Season: 2025–26
