= 2022–23 AFC Chindia Târgoviște season =

AFC Chindia Târgoviște
2022–23 season
- General director: Marcel Ghergu
- Head coach: Adrian Mihalcea (until 20 September); Anton Petrea (from 21 September)
- Stadium: Stadionul Ilie Oană
- Liga I: 15th (relegated)
- Cupa României: Group stage
- Top goalscorer: League: Doru Popadiuc (7); All: Daniel Popa; Doru Popadiuc (7 each)
- Biggest win: Voluntari 0–3 Chindia Târgovişte
- Biggest defeat: Hermannstadt 4–1 Chindia Târgovişte; Universitatea Craiova 3–0 Chindia Târgovişte
Home colours	Away colours	Third colours

The 2022–23 AFC Chindia Târgoviște season was the club's 13th season in existence and the seventh consecutive season in the top flight of Romanian football. In addition to the domestic league, Chindia Târgoviște participated in this season's edition of the Cupa României.

== Players ==
As of 6 February 2023

Note: Flags indicate national team as defined under FIFA eligibility rules; some limited exceptions apply. Players may hold more than one non-FIFA nationality.

No.	Pos.	Nation	Player
1	GK	ROU	Dinu Moldovan
5	MF	LTU	Modestas Vorobjovas
6	DF	ROU	Daniel Celea
7	MF	ROU	Alexandru Jipa
8	MF	ROU	Marco Dulca
9	FW	ITA	Godberg Cooper
10	FW	ROU	Cristian Neguț (Captain)
11	MF	ROU	Cosmin Atanase
12	GK	ROU	Mihai Eșanu
14	FW	MNE	Sergej Grubač
15	DF	ROU	Cornel Dinu (Vice-captain)
16	MF	ROU	Ovidiu Perianu (on loan from FCSB)
17	MF	COM	Nasser Chamed
19	FW	ROU	Daniel Popa (3rd captain)
20	MF	ROU	Alexandru Petre

No.	Pos.	Nation	Player
21	DF	GEQ	Esteban Obiang
23	MF	ROU	Andreas Mihaiu
25	DF	ROU	Deian Boldor
28	MF	ROU	Iulian Zamfir
29	MF	ROU	Sergiu Buș (on loan from CFR Cluj)
33	GK	ROU	Cătălin Căbuz
59	MF	ROU	Doru Popadiuc (4th captain)
66	MF	RUS	Rasambek Akhmatov
77	MF	ROU	Andrei Șerban
78	DF	ROU	Costel Avram
80	DF	ROU	Denis Dumitrașcu
88	DF	ROU	Adrian Ioniță
91	DF	FRA	Jérémy Corinus
98	DF	ROU	Tiberiu Căpușă
99	GK	ROU	Andres Brînzea

=== Out on loan ===
Note: Flags indicate national team as defined under FIFA eligibility rules; some limited exceptions apply. Players may hold more than one non-FIFA nationality.

No.	Pos.	Nation	Player
—	DF	ROU	Robert Nanciu (to Pucioasa until 30 June 2023)
—	MF	ROU	Javier Fuiorea (to Pucioasa until 30 June 2023)

No.	Pos.	Nation	Player
—	MF	ROU	Vlăduț Stancu (to Cetatea Turnu Măgurele until 30 June 2023)
—	MF	ROU	Marian Șerban (to CSM Slatina until 30 June 2023)

== Pre-season and friendlies ==
Win Draw Loss Fixtures

25 June 2022 Friendly	Chindia Târgoviște (Romania)	0–0	(Romania) Mioveni	Tărlungeni
10:30 CEST (UTC+2)				Stadium: Teren sintetic Unirea

29 June 2022 Friendly	Csikszereda (Romania)	0–1	(Romania) Chindia Târgoviște	Miercurea Ciuc
16:00 CEST (UTC+2)				Stadium: Stadionul Municipal

2 July 2022 Friendly	Farul Constanța (Romania)	2–3	(Romania) Chindia Târgoviște	Ghimbav
10:00 CEST (UTC+2)				Stadium: Baza Sportivă Campo Verde

9 July 2022 Friendly	Petrolul 52 (Romania)	1–1	(Romania) Chindia Târgoviște	Strejnicu
09:00 CEST (UTC+2)				Stadium: Stadionul CONPET

8 January 2023 Friendly	Chindia Târgoviște (Romania)	2–1	(Switzerland) Aarau	Belek, Turkey
17:00 TRT (UTC+3)				Stadium: Calista Sports Center - Field A

13 January 2023 Friendly	Chemnitzer FC (Germany)	1–0	(Romania) Chindia Târgoviște
CET (UTC+1)

== Competitions ==
=== Overview ===
Competition	First match	Last match	Starting round	Final position	Record							
Competition	First match	Last match	Starting round	Final position	Pld	W	D	L	GF	GA	GD	Win %
Liga I	18 July 2022	19 May 2023	Matchday 1	15th	39	9	12	18	39	54	−15	23.08
Cupa României	27 September 2022	7 December 2022	Play-off	Group stage	4	1	1	2	4	7	−3	25.00
Total					43	10	13	20	43	61	−18	23.26

Source: Soccerway

=== Liga I ===
==== Regular season ====
===== Table =====
Pos	Team	Pld	W	D	L	GF	GA	GD	Pts	Qualification
10	Voluntari	30	8	10	12	28	32	−4	34 (Note: Head to head points: Universitatea Cluj 4, Voluntari 1)	Qualification for the Play-out round
11	Botoșani	30	7	11	12	29	44	−15	32 (Note: Head to head points: Botoșani 6, Chindia 5, Hermannstadt 3)	Qualification for the Play-out round
12	Chindia Târgoviște	30	7	11	12	32	42	−10	32	Qualification for the Play-out round
13	Hermannstadt (Note: Hermannstadt was deposed with 9 points due to financial debts.)	30	11	8	11	30	29	+1	32	Qualification for the Play-out round
14	Argeș Pitești	30	6	9	15	21	41	−20	27 (Note: Head to head points: Arges 6, UTA 0)	Qualification for the Play-out round

Source: LPF (in Romanian) Soccerway
Rules for classification: 1) Points; 2) Head-to-head points; 3) Head-to-head goal difference; 4) Head-to-head goals scored; 5) Goal difference; 6) Goals scored; 7) Play-off.

==== Results summary ====
Overall								Home						Away					
Pld	W	D	L	GF	GA	GD	Pts	W	D	L	GF	GA	GD	W	D	L	GF	GA	GD
0	0	0	0	0	0	0	0	0	0	0	0	0	0	0	0	0	0	0	0

Last updated: July 2022.
Source: Liga 1

==== Results by round ====
Round	1
Ground	
Result	
Position	

Updated to match(es) played on July 2022. Source: Liga 1
A = Away; H = Home; W = Win; D = Draw; L = Loss

===== Matches =====
The league fixtures were announced on 1 July 2022.

18 July 2022 1	Botoșani	3–2	Chindia Târgoviște	Botoșani
18:30 EEST (UTC+3)	Mailat 3' (pen.), 31'; Florescu 29'	Report	Șerban 13'; Mihaiu 48'	Stadium: Stadionul Municipal; Referee: Horațiu Feșnic

25 July 2022 2	Chindia Târgoviște	1–1	Hermannstadt	Ploiești
18:30 EEST (UTC+3)	Celea 9'	Report	Oroian 2'	Stadium: Stadionul Ilie Oană; Referee: Adrian Cojocaru

29 July 2022 3	Farul Constanța	0–0	Chindia Târgoviște	Ovidiu
21:30 EEST (UTC+3)		Report		Stadium: Central Stadium; Referee: George Găman

7 August 2022 4	Chindia Târgoviște	0–2	CFR Cluj	Ploiești
18:30 EEST (UTC+3)		Report	Muhar 27'; Yeboah 45+1'	Stadium: Stadionul Ilie Oană; Referee: Iulian Călin

14 August 2022 5	FCSB	3–2	Chindia Târgoviște	Bucharest
21:30 EEST (UTC+3)	Cordea 48', 55'; Tamm 59'; Edjouma (yellow card) 78'	Report	Neguț (red card) 7'; Popadiuc 22', (yellow card) 66'; Popa 28'; Mihaiu (yellow card) 85'; Vorobjovas (yellow card) 90+2'	Stadium: Arena Națională; Referee: Ionuţ Coza

28 August 2022 7	Argeș Pitești	2–1	Chindia Târgoviște	Pitești
13:30 EEST (UTC+3)	Garita 58'; Ișfan 76'	Report	Popadiuc 30'	Stadium: Stadionul Nicolae Dobrin; Referee: Iulian Dima

31 August 2022 8	Chindia Târgoviște	2–3	Petrolul Ploiești	Ploiești
16:30 EEST (UTC+3)	Popa 75'; Atanase 80'	Report	Dumitriu 8', 22'; Irobiso 82'	Stadium: Stadionul Ilie Oană; Referee: Andrei Chivulete

3 September 2022 9	UTA Arad	1–1	Chindia Târgoviște	Arad
19:00 EEST (UTC+3)	Benga 86'	Report	Balauru 44' (o.g.)	Stadium: Stadionul Francisc von Neuman; Referee: Szabolcs Kovacs

10 September 2022 10	Chindia Târgoviște	1–2	Sepsi OSK	Ploiești
13:00 EEST (UTC+3)	Cooper 43'	Report	Rondón 37' (pen.); Gheorghe 81' (pen.)	Stadium: Stadionul Ilie Oană; Referee: Viorel Flueran

18 September 2022 11	Universitatea Cluj	1–0	Chindia Târgoviște	Mediaș
18:30 EEST (UTC+3)	Fülöp 63'	Report		Stadium: Stadionul Municipal Gaz Metan; Referee: Sorin Antonie

3 October 2022 12	Chindia Târgoviște	2–1	Rapid București	Ploiești
21:00 EEST (UTC+3)	D. Popa 15'; Neguț 56'	Report	Sefer 59'	Stadium: Stadionul Ilie Oană; Referee: Lucian Rusandu

10 October 2022 13	FC U Craiova 1948	0–1	Chindia Târgoviște	Craiova
17:30 EEST (UTC+3)		Report	Popadiuc 64'	Stadium: Stadionul Ion Oblemenco; Referee: Rareș Vidican

16 October 2022 14	Chindia Târgoviște	1–0	Mioveni	Ploiești
14:00 EEST (UTC+3)	Obiang 87'	Report		Stadium: Stadionul Ilie Oană; Referee: Marian Barbu

22 October 2022 15	Voluntari	0–3	Chindia Târgoviște	Voluntari
17:00 EEST (UTC+3)	Govea (yellow card) 32'; Achim (yellow card) 74'	Report	Popadiuc 14', 68', 82', (yellow card) 32'	Stadium: Stadionul Anghel Iordănescu; Referee: Cătălin Popa

28 October 2022 16	Chindia Târgoviște	2–2	Botoșani	Ploiești
18:00 EEST (UTC+3)	Popadiuc 3'; D. Popa 90+4'	Report	Mailat 33' (pen.); Camara 79'	Stadium: Stadionul Ilie Oană; Referee: Florin Andrei

6 November 2022 17	Hermannstadt	0–1	Chindia Târgoviște	Mediaș
16:15 EET (UTC+2)		Report	Celea 51'	Stadium: Stadionul Municipal Gaz Metan; Referee: Horia Mladinovici

12 November 2022 18	Chindia Târgoviște	1–1	Farul Constanța	Ploiești
17:30 EET (UTC+2)	Neguț 90+1' (pen.)	Report	Pitu 67'	Stadium: Stadionul Ilie Oană; Referee: Sebastian Colțescu

29 November 2022 6	Chindia Târgoviște	1–1	Universitatea Craiova	Ploiești
19:00 EET (UTC+2)	D. Popa 90'	Report	Crețu 13'	Stadium: Stadionul Ilie Oană; Referee: Ionuţ Coza

4 December 2022 19	CFR Cluj	2–0	Chindia Târgoviște	Cluj-Napoca
15:30 EET (UTC+2)	Kolinger 17'; Manea 80' (pen.)	Report		Stadium: Stadionul Dr. Constantin Rădulescu; Referee: Marian Barbu

11 December 2022 20	Chindia Târgoviște	0–2	FCSB	Ploiești
20:30 EET (UTC+2)	Obiang (yellow card) 23'; Neguț (yellow card) 40'; Popadiuc (yellow card) 57'; Celea (yellow card) 86'	Report	Radunović 24' (pen.); Miculescu (yellow card) 41'; Cordea (yellow card) 54'; Omrani 73'	Stadium: Stadionul Ilie Oană; Referee: Horațiu Feșnic

17 December 2022 21	Universitatea Craiova	3–0	Chindia Târgoviște	Craiova
20:30 EET (UTC+2)	Crețu 22'; Marković 29'; Mitrea 65'	Report		Stadium: Stadionul Ion Oblemenco; Referee: Florin Andrei

23 January 2023 22	Chindia Târgoviște	1–1	Argeș Pitești	Ploiești
17:00 EET (UTC+2)	Neguț 42'	Report	Garita 55'	Stadium: Stadionul Ilie Oană; Referee: Andrei Chivulete

28 January 2023 23	Petrolul Ploiești	1–2	Chindia Târgoviște	Ploiești
17:00 EET (UTC+2)	Grozav 27' (pen.)	Report	Cooper 70'; D. Popa 85'	Stadium: Stadionul Ilie Oană; Referee: Viorel Flueran

3 February 2023 24	Chindia Târgoviște	2–1	UTA Arad	Ploiești
17:00 EET (UTC+2)	Cooper 9'; Neguț 81', (yellow card) 90+2'	Report	Ubbink 31'; Cascini (yellow card) 72'	Stadium: Stadionul Ilie Oană; Referee: Horia Mladinovici

13 February 2023 25	Sepsi OSK	2–2	Chindia Târgoviște	Sfântu Gheorghe
17:00 EET (UTC+2)	Rondón 45+3'; Šafranko 56'	Report	Cooper 20'; Akhmatov 44'	Stadium: Sepsi Arena Stadium; Referee: Sebastian Colțescu

17 February 2023 26	Chindia Târgoviște	2–2	Universitatea Cluj	Ploiești
17:00 EET (UTC+2)	Neguț 64' (pen.); Boldor 90+5'	Report	Thiam 44'; Zé Gomes 51'	Stadium: Stadionul Ilie Oană; Referee: István Kovács

25 February 2023 27	Rapid București	2–0	Chindia Târgoviște	Bucharest
20:00 EET (UTC+2)	Dugandžić 66' (pen.); Boldor 68' (o.g.)	Report		Stadium: Superbet Arena-Giulești; Referee: Andrei Chivulete

28 February 2023 28	Chindia Târgoviște	0–0	FC U Craiova 1948	Ploiești
18:00 EET (UTC+2)		Report		Stadium: Stadionul Ilie Oană; Referee: Cătălin Popa

5 March 2023 29	Mioveni	2–0	Chindia Târgoviște	Mioveni
13:00 EET (UTC+2)	Rusu 34'; Lixandru 90+1'	Report		Stadium: Stadionul Orășenesc; Referee: Adrian Cojocaru

13 March 2023 30	Chindia Târgoviște	1–1	Voluntari	Ploiești
17:30 EET (UTC+2)	Cooper 71'	Report	Damașcan 15'	Stadium: Stadionul Ilie Oană; Referee: Andrei Moroiță

==== Play-out round ====
===== Table =====
Pos	Team	Pld	W	D	L	GF	GA	GD	Pts	Qualification or relegation
7	FCU 1948 Craiova	9	4	4	1	13	7	+6	36	Qualification to European competition play-offs
8	Petrolul Ploiești	9	5	1	3	9	9	0	34	ineligible for european competitions (Note: Petrolul Ploiești failed to obtain a UEFA licence.)
9	Voluntari	9	4	5	0	17	11	+6	34	Qualification to European competition play-offs
10	Universitatea Cluj	9	5	1	3	12	9	+3	33	
11	Hermannstadt	9	4	3	2	10	7	+3	31	
12	Botoșani	9	4	3	2	10	5	+5	31	
13	UTA Arad (O)	9	3	3	3	10	9	+1	26	Qualification for the relegation play-offs
14	Argeș Pitești (R)	9	3	1	5	10	11	−1	24	Qualification for the relegation play-offs
15	Chindia Târgoviște (R)	9	2	1	6	7	12	−5	23	Relegation to Liga II
16	Mioveni (R)	9	0	0	9	1	19	−18	11	Relegation to Liga II

Source: Soccerway, FRF (in Romanian), LPF (in Romanian)
Rules for classification: 1) Points; 2) Points without rounding; 3) Points in the regular season; 4) Goal difference; 5) Goals scored; 6) Play-off (only if needed to decide teams for relegation). (Note: only criteria 4 and 5 are applied to establish the classification during the competition.)
(O) Play-off winners; (R) Relegated

===== Matches =====
18 March 2023 1	Botoșani	1–0	Chindia Târgoviște	Botoșani
14:30 EET (UTC+2)	Mailat 90'	Report		Stadium: Stadionul Municipal; Referee: Rareș Vidican

3 April 2023 2	Mioveni	0–1	Chindia Târgoviște	Mioveni
17:30 EEST (UTC+3)		Report	Căpușă 52'	Stadium: Stadionul Orășenesc; Referee: Bogdan Dumitrache

9 April 2023 3	Chindia Târgoviște	1–2	Hermannstadt	Ploiești
13:00 EEST (UTC+3)	D. Popa 15'	Report	Obiang 78' (o.g.); Opruț 90+2'	Stadium: Stadionul Ilie Oană; Referee: Szabolcs Kovacs

17 April 2023 4	Argeș Pitești	1–0	Chindia Târgoviște	Pitești
17:30 EEST (UTC+3)	Turda 19'	Report		Stadium: Stadionul Nicolae Dobrin; Referee: Marcel Bîrsan

23 April 2023 5	Chindia Târgoviște	2–1	UTA Arad	Ploiești
14:00 EEST (UTC+3)	D. Popa 19', 62'	Report	Pop 54'	Stadium: Stadionul Ilie Oană; Referee: Ionuţ Coza

28 April 2023 6	FC U Craiova 1948	1–0	Chindia Târgoviște	Craiova
20:30 EEST (UTC+3)	Baeten 45'	Report		Stadium: Stadionul Ion Oblemenco; Referee: Iulian Călin

5 May 2023 7	Chindia Târgoviște	1–2	Petrolul Ploiești	Ploiești
20:30 EEST (UTC+3)	Popadiuc 5'	Report	Diomandé 50'; Grozav 77'	Stadium: Stadionul Ilie Oană; Referee: Marian Barbu

13 May 2023 8	Universitatea Cluj	2–0	Chindia Târgoviște	Cluj-Napoca
19:00 EEST (UTC+3)	Remacle 35'; Nistor 65'	Report		Stadium: Cluj Arena; Referee: Marcel Bîrsan

19 May 2023 9	Chindia Târgoviște	2–2	Voluntari	Ploiești
20:00 EEST (UTC+3)	Neguț 48'; Șerban 75'	Report	Damașcan 42'; Meleke 45+2'	Stadium: Stadionul Ilie Oană; Referee: Sebastian Colțescu
