= 2021–22 AFC Chindia Târgoviște season =

Chindia Târgoviște
2021–22 season
- Chairman: Marcel Ghergu
- Head coach: Emil Săndoi
- Stadium: Stadionul Eugen Popescu
- Liga I: 13th
- Cupa României: Quarter-finals
- Top goalscorer: League: Daniel Florea (6); All: Daniel Florea (6)

The 2021–22 season was the 12th season in the existence of AFC Chindia Târgoviște and the club's third consecutive season in the top flight of Romanian football. In addition to the domestic league, Chindia Târgoviște participating in this season's edition of the Cupa României.

== Players ==
=== First-team squad ===
Note: Flags indicate national team as defined under FIFA eligibility rules; some limited exceptions apply. Players may hold more than one non-FIFA nationality.

No.	Pos.	Nation	Player
1	GK	ROU	Dinu Moldovan
2	DF	ROU	Marius Martac (4th captain)
3	DF	GRE	Nikos Baxevanos
4	MF	ARG	Juan Pablo Passaglia
5	DF	ROU	Daniel Celea
6	MF	ROU	Paul Iacob (Vice-captain)
7	DF	ROU	Laurențiu Corbu
8	MF	ROU	Marco Dulca
10	FW	BUL	Tsvetelin Chunchukov (on loan from Sepsi OSK)
11	FW	ROU	Daniel Florea (3rd captain)
13	FW	ROU	Cristian Cherchez
14	FW	FRA	Richard Sila
15	DF	ROU	Cornel Dinu (Captain)
16	DF	ROU	Mihai Butean (on loan from CFR Cluj)
17	MF	ROU	Marian Șerban

No.	Pos.	Nation	Player
20	DF	ALB	Simo Rrumbullaku
21	MF	ROU	Cosmin Atanase
22	DF	ROU	Andrei Pițian
23	DF	SLO	Milan Kocić
33	GK	ROU	Cătălin Căbuz
59	MF	ROU	Doru Popadiuc
63	MF	ROU	Vlăduț Stancu
69	MF	COM	Nasser Chamed
77	MF	ROU	Andrei Șerban
86	MF	ROU	Denis Rusu (on loan from CFR Cluj)
88	DF	ROU	Adrian Ioniță
91	MF	HAI	Mikaël Cantave
97	MF	ROU	Alexandru Jipa
98	DF	ROU	Tiberiu Căpușă
99	GK	ROU	Rareș Pop

=== Out on loan ===
Note: Flags indicate national team as defined under FIFA eligibility rules; some limited exceptions apply. Players may hold more than one non-FIFA nationality.

No.	Pos.	Nation	Player
—	DF	ROU	Robert Călin (to Flacăra Moreni)
—	DF	ROU	Radu Simion (to Pucioasa)

No.	Pos.	Nation	Player
—	MF	ROU	Iulian Zamfir (to Filiași)
—	FW	ROU	Cristian Neguț (to CFR Cluj)

== Pre-season and friendlies ==
Win Draw Loss Fixtures

23 June 2021 Friendly	Academica Clinceni (Romania)	1–0	(Romania) Chindia Târgoviște	Romania
11:00 EEST (UTC+3)

30 June 2021 Friendly	Farul Constanța (Romania)	1–2	(Romania) Chindia Târgoviște	Ghimbav, Romania
18:00 EEST (UTC+3)				Stadium: Baza Sportivă Campo Verde

3 July 2021 Friendly	Chindia Târgoviște (Romania)	1–3	(Romania) FCSB	Bucharest, Romania
16:30 EEST (UTC+3)				Stadium: Baza ARCOM

7 July 2021 Friendly	Chindia Târgoviște (Romania)	0–0	(Romania) Miercurea Ciuc	Romania
18:00 EEST (UTC+3)

9 July 2021 Friendly	Petrolul Ploiești (Romania)	0–0	(Romania) Chindia Târgoviște	Strejnicu, Romania
11:00 EEST (UTC+3)				Stadium: Stadionul Conpet

4 September 2021 Friendly	Brașov (Romania)	1–1	(Romania) Chindia Târgoviște	Brașov, Romania
11:00 EEST (UTC+3)				Stadium: Stadionul Tineretului

12 November 2021 Friendly	Petrolul Ploiești (Romania)	1–4	(Romania) Chindia Târgoviște	Strejnicu, Romania
11:00 EET (UTC+2)				Stadium: Stadionul Conpet

12 January 2022 Friendly	Paksi SE (Hungary)	3–0	(Romania) Chindia Târgoviște	Antalya, Turkey
15:00 TRT (UTC+3)				Stadium: Sports Complex Ismail Gekček

14 January 2022 Friendly	Chindia Târgoviște (Romania)	0–2	(Czech Republic) Slovan Liberec	Belek, Turkey
15:00 TRT (UTC+3)				Stadium: Papillon Sports Centre

== Competitions ==
=== Overall record ===
Competition	First match	Last match	Starting round	Final position	Record							
Competition	First match	Last match	Starting round	Final position	Pld	W	D	L	GF	GA	GD	Win %
Liga I	16 July 2021	13 May 2022	Matchday 1	13th	39	10	13	16	31	31	+0	25.64
Promotion/relegation play-offs	21 May 2022	29 May 2022	First leg	Second leg	2	1	0	1	2	2	+0	50.00
Cupa României	22 September 2021	30 November 2021	Round of 32	Quarter-finals	3	2	0	1	3	2	+1	66.67
Total					44	13	13	18	36	35	+1	29.55

Source: Soccerway

=== Liga I ===
==== Regular season ====
Pos	Team	Pld	W	D	L	GF	GA	GD	Pts	Qualification
9	Rapid București	30	9	13	8	34	31	+3	40	Qualification for the Play-out round
10	Sepsi OSK	30	9	12	9	33	29	+4	39	Qualification for the Play-out round
11	Chindia Târgoviște	30	8	11	11	23	23	0	35	Qualification for the Play-out round
12	FC U Craiova 1948	30	8	9	13	31	35	−4	33	Qualification for the Play-out round
13	Mioveni	30	6	11	13	19	36	−17	29	Qualification for the Play-out round

Source: LPF (in Romanian) Soccerway
Rules for classification: 1) Points; 2) Head-to-head points; 3) Head-to-head goal difference; 4) Head-to-head goals scored; 5) Goal difference; 6) Goals scored; 7) Play-off.

==== Results summary ====
Overall								Home						Away					
Pld	W	D	L	GF	GA	GD	Pts	W	D	L	GF	GA	GD	W	D	L	GF	GA	GD
0	0	0	0	0	0	0	0	0	0	0	0	0	0	0	0	0	0	0	0

==== Results by round ====
Round	1	2	3	4	5	6	7	8	9	10	11	12	13	14	15	16	17	18	19	20	21	22	23	24	25	26	27	28	29	30
Ground	A	H	A	H	A	H	A	A	H	A	H	A	H	A	H	H	A	H	A	H	A	H	H	A	H	A	H	A	H	A
Result	L	D	L	W	D	D	L	W	W	D	L	D	L	W	L	D	D	L	L	L	W	D	D	W	D	L	D	L	W	W
Position	13	12	15	11	12	10	13	11	10	10	10	10	10	10	10	10	10	11	11	12	11	13	12	11	11	11	11	12	12	11

A = Away; H = Home; W = Win; D = Draw; L = Loss

==== Matches ====
18 July 2021 1	Rapid București	1–0	Chindia Târgoviște	Bucharest
--:-- EEST (UTC+3)				Stadium: Rapid Arena

26 July 2021 2	Chindia Târgoviște	1–1	Sepsi OSK	Buzău
18:30 EEST (UTC+3)				Stadium: Stadionul Municipal

31 July 2021 3	CFR Cluj	1–0	Chindia Târgoviște	Cluj-Napoca
--:-- EEST (UTC+3)				Stadium: Stadionul Dr. Constantin Rădulescu

8 August 2021 4	Chindia Târgoviște	1–0	Dinamo București	Buzău
19:00 EEST (UTC+3)				Stadium: Stadionul Municipal

14 August 2021 5	FC U Craiova	0–0	Chindia Târgoviște	Craiova
--:-- EEST (UTC+3)				Stadium: Stadionul Ion Oblemenco

20 August 2021 6	Chindia Târgoviște	2–2	Academica Clinceni	Buzău
18:30 EEST (UTC+3)				Stadium: Stadionul Municipal

27 August 2021 7	Voluntari	2–1	Chindia Târgoviște	Voluntari
--:-- EEST (UTC+3)				Stadium: Stadionul Anghel Iordănescu

10 September 2021 8	Mioveni	0–1	Chindia Târgoviște	Mioveni
--:-- EEST (UTC+3)				Stadium: Stadionul Orășenesc

18 September 2021 9	Chindia Târgoviște	2–0	Farul Constanța	Ploiești
14:30 EEST (UTC+3)				Stadium: Ilie Oană Stadium

25 September 2021 10	Argeș Pitești	0–0	Chindia Târgoviște	Pitești
--:-- EEST (UTC+3)				Stadium: Stadionul Nicolae Dobrin

1 October 2021 11	Chindia Târgoviște	0–1	FCSB	Ploiești
21:00 EEST (UTC+3)				Stadium: Ilie Oană Stadium

18 October 2021 12	Botoșani	0–0	Chindia Târgoviște	Botoșani
--:-- EEST (UTC+3)				Stadium: Stadionul Municipal

22 October 2021 13	Chindia Târgoviște	0–1	Universitatea Craiova	Ploiești
20:30 EEST (UTC+3)				Stadium: Ilie Oană Stadium

1 November 2021 14	UTA Arad	0–2	Chindia Târgoviște	Arad
--:-- EET (UTC+2)				Stadium: Stadionul Francisc von Neuman

5 November 2021 15	Chindia Târgoviște	0–1	Gaz Metan Mediaș	Ploiești
17:30 EET (UTC+2)			Matricardi 90+1'	Stadium: Ilie Oană Stadium; Referee: István Kovács

19 November 2021 16	Chindia Târgoviște	2–2	Rapid București	Ploiești
20:30 EET (UTC+2)	Neguț 53'; Popa 62'		Ilie 60'; Marzouk 89'	Stadium: Ilie Oană Stadium; Referee: Andrei Chivulete

27 November 2021 17	Sepsi OSK	0–0	Chindia Târgoviște	Sfântu Gheorghe
--:-- EET (UTC+2)				Stadium: Stadionul Sepsi Arena

4 December 2021 18	Chindia Târgoviște	0–1	FCSB	Ploiești
15:00 EET (UTC+2)			Omrani 21'	Stadium: Ilie Oană Stadium; Referee: Radu Petrescu

13 December 2021 19	Dinamo București	1–0	Chindia Târgoviște	Bucharest
20:30 EET (UTC+2)				Stadium: Stadionul Dinamo

16 December 2021 20	Chindia Târgoviște	0–3	FC U Craiova	Ploiești
15:00 EET (UTC+2)			Bălan 45+6' (pen.); Baeten 59'; Compagno 87'	Stadium: Ilie Oană Stadium; Referee: Horațiu Feșnic

19 December 2021 21	Academica Clinceni	0–1	Chindia Târgoviște	Giurgiu
13:30 EET (UTC+2)			Neguț 83'	Stadium: Stadionul Marin Anastasovici; Referee: George Găman

22 January 2022 22	Chindia Târgoviște	0–0	Voluntari	Ploiești
14:30 EET (UTC+2)				Stadium: Ilie Oană Stadium; Referee: Cătălin Popa

30 January 2022 23	Chindia Târgoviște	0–0	Mioveni	Ploiești
14:00 EET (UTC+2)				Stadium: Ilie Oană Stadium; Referee: István Kovács

5 February 2022 24	Farul Constanța	0–1	Chindia Târgoviște	Ovidiu
16:00 EET (UTC+2)			Florea 82'	Stadium: Stadionul Viitorul; Referee: Horia Gabriel Mladinovici

9 February 2022 25	Chindia Târgoviște	1–1	Argeș Pitești	Ploiești
15:00 EET (UTC+2)	Dulca 20'		Ișfan 64'	Stadium: Ilie Oană Stadium; Referee: Iulian Dima

13 February 2022 26	FCSB	3–2	Chindia Târgoviște	Bucharest
19:55 EET (UTC+2)	Olaru 47'; Gheorghe 67', 77'		Popa 15'; Butean 21'	Stadium: Arena Națională; Referee: Andrei Chivulete

20 February 2022 27	Chindia Târgoviște	1–1	Botoșani	Ploiești
12:30 EET (UTC+2)	Sila 13'		Mateus 53'	Stadium: Ilie Oană Stadium; Referee: Bogdan Dumitrache

25 February 2022 28	Universitatea Craiova	1–0	Chindia Târgoviște	Craiova
20:30 EET (UTC+2)	Gustavo Vagenin 28'			Stadium: Stadionul Ion Oblemenco; Referee: Horațiu Feșnic

1 March 2022 29	Chindia Târgoviște	1–0	UTA Arad	Ploiești
15:00 EET (UTC+2)	Florea 87'			Stadium: Ilie Oană Stadium; Referee: Marcel Bîrsan

6 March 2022 30	Gaz Metan Mediaș	0–4	Chindia Târgoviște	Mediaș
15:00 EET (UTC+2)			Șerban 5'; Florea 34', 37'; Doru Popadiuc 76'	Stadium: Stadionul Gaz Metan; Referee: Szabolcs Kovacs

==== Play-out round ====
Pos	Team	Pld	W	D	L	GF	GA	GD	Pts	Qualification or relegation
7	Sepsi OSK (Q)	9	7	1	1	21	4	+17	42	Qualification to Europa Conference League second qualifying round (Note: Sepsi OSK qualified for the 2022–23 UEFA Europa Conference League by winning the 2021–22 Cupa României.)
8	Botoșani	9	6	0	3	18	9	+9	41	Qualification to European competition play-offs
9	Rapid București	9	6	1	2	22	7	+15	39	
10	FC U Craiova 1948	9	5	2	2	14	11	+3	34	
11	UTA Arad	9	4	1	4	10	6	+4	33	
12	Mioveni	9	5	1	3	12	10	+2	31	
13	Chindia Târgoviște (O)	9	2	2	5	8	8	0	26	Qualification for the relegation play-offs
14	Dinamo București (R)	9	4	2	3	14	11	+3	23	Qualification for the relegation play-offs
15	Academica Clinceni (Note: Academica were deducted 44 points due to financial reasons. They later dissolved and restarted under a new name called HD Clinceni 2022.) (D, R)	9	0	0	9	4	32	−28	−43	Clubs withdrew from the league
16	Gaz Metan Mediaș (Note: Gaz Metan Mediaș were deducted 50 points due to financial reasons. They later withdrew and completed under the name of ACS Mediaș 2022.) (D, R)	9	1	0	8	6	31	−25	−46	Clubs withdrew from the league

Source: Soccerway, FRF (in Romanian), LPF (in Romanian)
Rules for classification: 1) Points; 2) Points without rounding; 3) Points in the regular season; 4) Goal difference; 5) Goals scored; 6) Play-off (only if needed to decide teams for relegation). (Note: only criteria 4 and 5 are applied to establish the classification during the competition.)
(D) Disqualified; (O) Play-off winners; (Q) Qualified for the phase indicated; (R) Relegated

==== Results summary ====
Overall								Home						Away					
Pld	W	D	L	GF	GA	GD	Pts	W	D	L	GF	GA	GD	W	D	L	GF	GA	GD
9	2	2	5	8	8	0	8	1	2	2	4	4	0	1	0	3	4	4	0

Last updated: 1 April 2022.

==== Results by round ====
Round	1	2	3	4	5	6	7	8	9
Ground	H	A	H	A	H	A	H	A	H
Result	D	L	L	W	L	L	D	L	W
Position									

A = Away; H = Home; W = Win; D = Draw; L = Loss

==== Matches ====
12 March 2022 1	Chindia Târgoviște	0–0	FC U Craiova	Ploieşti
17:30 EET (UTC+2)		Report		Stadium: Stadionul Ilie Oană

21 March 2022 2	Mioveni	1–0	Chindia Târgoviște	Mioveni
20:30 EET (UTC+2)		Report		Stadium: Stadionul Orăşenesc

1 April 2022 3	Chindia Târgoviște	0–2	Dinamo București	Ploiești
20:30 EEST (UTC+3)				Stadium: Ilie Oană Stadium

8 April 2022 4	Academica Clinceni	0–3	Chindia Târgoviște	Clinceni
16:30 EEST (UTC+3)				Stadium: Stadionul Clinceni

15 April 2022 5	Chindia Târgoviște	1–2	Botoșani	Ploiești
17:30 EEST (UTC+3)				Stadium: Ilie Oană Stadium

23 April 2022 6	UTA Arad	1–0	Chindia Târgoviște	Arad
13:30 EEST (UTC+3)				Stadium: Stadionul Francisc von Neuman

29 April 2022 7	Chindia Târgoviște	0–0	Rapid București	Ploiești
20:30 EEST (UTC+3)				Stadium: Ilie Oană Stadium

8 May 2022 8	Sepsi OSK	2–1	Chindia Târgoviște	Sfântu Gheorghe
14:30 EEST (UTC+3)				Stadium: Stadionul Sepsi Arena

13 May 2022 9	Chindia Târgoviște	3–0	Gaz Metan Mediaș	Ploiești
17:30 EEST (UTC+3)				Stadium: Ilie Oană Stadium
