= 2023–24 AFC Chindia Târgoviște season =

AFC Chindia Târgoviște
2023–24 season
- Stadium: Stadionul Eugen Popescu
- Liga II: 9th
- Cupa României: Group stage
- Top goalscorer: League: Robert Moldoveanu (6); All: Robert Moldoveanu (6)
Home colours	Away colours

The 2023–24 season is AFC Chindia Târgoviște's 14th season in existence and first one back in the Liga II. They are also competing in the Cupa României.

== Players ==
=== First-team squad ===
As of 11 October 2023

Note: Flags indicate national team as defined under FIFA eligibility rules; some limited exceptions apply. Players may hold more than one non-FIFA nationality.

No.	Pos.	Nation	Player
5	DF	ROU	Ionuț Anișorac (on loan from UTA Arad)
6	DF	ESP	Christian Rutjens
7	FW	ROU	Octavian Ursu
8	MF	ROU	Răzvan Tache
9	MF	ROU	Alberto Călin (on loan from Universitatea Craiova)
10	FW	ROU	Răzvan Matiș
11	MF	ROU	Luca Manolache (on loan from FCSB)
13	FW	MDA	Maxim Cojocaru
14	MF	ROU	Alex Militaru (on loan from Politehnica Iași)
15	DF	ROU	Cornel Dinu (Vice-captain)
17	FW	ROU	Robert Moldoveanu
19	FW	CRO	Ante Živković
20	DF	ROU	Alexandru Gîţ
23	MF	ROU	Vlad Prejmerean (Captain)
24	DF	ITA	Roberto Romeo
28	MF	ROU	Ionuț Albu

No.	Pos.	Nation	Player
29	FW	GAM	Mustapha Jah (on loan from CFR Cluj)
32	GK	ROU	Iustin Popescu (3rd captain)
36	MF	ROU	Alin Boțogan (on loan from Petrolul Ploiești)
37	DF	ROU	Florin Plămadă
38	FW	ROU	Cătălin Golofca
39	GK	MDA	Dorian Railean
55	MF	CIV	Ricky Gnéba (on loan from CFR Cluj)
58	MF	SUI	Matteo Fedele
66	DF	ROU	Andrei Marc
69	MF	COM	Nasser Chamed
71	MF	MDA	Victor Bogaciuc
77	MF	ROU	Andrei Șerban
88	DF	ROU	Adrian Ioniță
99	GK	ROU	Andres Brînzea
—	MF	ROU	Claudiu Negoescu (on loan from UTA Arad)

=== Out on loan ===
Note: Flags indicate national team as defined under FIFA eligibility rules; some limited exceptions apply. Players may hold more than one non-FIFA nationality.

No.	Pos.	Nation	Player
—	DF	ROU	Iulian Zamfir (to Pucioasa)
—	MF	ROU	Alexandru Petre (to Pucioasa)

No.	Pos.	Nation	Player
—	MF	ROU	Valentin Ioniță (to Pucioasa)

== Transfers ==
=== In ===
Pos.	Player	Transferred from	Fee	Date	Source
GK	(Moldova) Dorian Railean	(Romania) Unirea Dej	Free	1 July 2023	
MF	(Moldova) Maxim Cojocaru	(Moldova) Petrocub	Free	11 August 2023	
MF	(Moldova) Victor Bogaciuc	(Moldova) Petrocub		15 August 2023	
DF	(Spain) Christian Rutjens	(Italy) Foggia	Free	28 August 2023	

=== Out ===
Pos.	Player	Transferred to	Fee	Date	Source
MF	(Romania) Marco Dulca	Released		1 July 2023	

== Pre-season and friendlies ==
Win Draw Loss Fixtures

8 July 2023 Friendly	Chindia Târgoviște (Romania)	0–1	(Romania) Unirea Slobozia

19 July 2023 Friendly	Chindia Târgoviște (Romania)	1–1	(Romania) Ceahlăul

10 September 2023 Friendly	Petrolul Ploiești (Romania)	2–0	(Romania) Chindia Târgoviște

== Competitions ==
=== Overall record ===
Competition	First match	Last match	Starting round	Final position	Record							
Competition	First match	Last match	Starting round	Final position	Pld	W	D	L	GF	GA	GD	Win %
Liga II	8 August 2023	16 March 2024	Matchday 1	9th	25	10	8	7	35	18	+17	40.00
Cupa României	16 August 2023	7 December 2023	Third round	Group stagee	5	2	0	3	8	5	+3	40.00
Total					30	12	8	10	43	23	+20	40.00

Source: Soccerway

=== Liga II ===
==== League table ====
Pos	Team	Pld	W	D	L	GF	GA	GD	Pts	Promotion or relegation
7	Ceahlăul Piatra Neamț	19	9	4	6	30	17	+13	31	Qualification for Relegation play-out
8	Steaua București	19	7	7	5	37	24	+13	28	Qualification for Relegation play-out
9	Chindia Târgoviște	19	7	7	5	27	14	+13	28	Qualification for Relegation play-out
10	Reșița	19	7	6	6	28	25	+3	27	Qualification for Relegation play-out
11	Metaloglobus București	19	6	8	5	20	22	−2	26	Qualification for Relegation play-out

Source: FRF (in Romanian)
Rules for classification: During Season: 1) Points, 2) Goal difference, 3) Goals scored. End of Season: 1) Points, 2) Head-to-head points, 3) Head-to-head goal difference, 4) Goal difference, 5) Goals scored

Pos	Team	Pld	W	D	L	GF	GA	GD	Pts	Promotion or qualification
1	Unirea Slobozia (P, C)	10	6	2	2	9	6	+3	60	Promotion to Liga I
2	Corvinul Hunedoara (Note: Corvinul Hunedoara and 1599 Șelimbăr are ineligible for promotion due to the clubs being owned by comunal departments/entities, all Liga I clubs are required to be privately owned.)	10	4	3	3	14	11	+3	52	Qualification for Europa League first qualifying round (Note: Corvinul Hunedoara qualified for the Europa League first qualifying round as 2023–24 Cupa României winners.)
3	1599 Șelimbăr	10	1	6	3	8	12	−4	51 (Note: 1599 Șelimbăr finished ahead of Gloria Buzău on regular season points: 1599 Șelimbăr 42, Gloria Buzău 34.)	
4	Gloria Buzău (P)	10	4	5	1	12	7	+5	51	Promotion to Liga I
5	Mioveni (Q)	10	2	4	4	10	11	−1	43	Qualification for play-offs
6	Csíkszereda Miercurea Ciuc (Q)	10	2	2	6	9	15	−6	40	Qualification for play-offs

Source: FRF
Rules for classification: 1) Points; 2) Points in the regular season; 3) Head-to-head points; 4) Head-to-head goal difference; 5) Head-to-head goals scored; 6) Head-to-head away goals scored; 7) Goal difference (regular season + play off); 8) Goals scored (regular season + play off); 9) Play-off.
(C) Champions; (P) Promoted; (Q) Qualified for the phase indicated

==== Results summary ====
Overall								Home						Away					
Pld	W	D	L	GF	GA	GD	Pts	W	D	L	GF	GA	GD	W	D	L	GF	GA	GD
15	5	6	4	20	11	+9	21	3	3	2	14	7	+7	2	3	2	6	4	+2

Source: Superliga

==== Results by round ====
Round	1
Ground	
Result	
Position	

Source: Superliga
A = Away; H = Home; W = Win; D = Draw; L = Loss

==== Matches ====
8 August 2023 1	Chindia Târgoviște	1–1	CSA Steaua	Târgoviște
21:00				Stadium: Stadionul Eugen Popescu

12 August 2023 2	CSM Slatina	0–0	Chindia Târgoviște	Slatina
12:15				Stadium: Stadionul 1 Mai

22 August 2023 3	Chindia Târgoviște	1–1	Gloria Buzău	Târgoviște
19:00				Stadium: Stadionul Eugen Popescu

26 August 2023 4	Argeș Pitești	0–2	Chindia Târgoviște	Mioveni
11:00				Stadium: Stadionul Orășenesc

3 September 2023 5	Chindia Târgoviște	0–1	Unirea Slobozia	Târgoviște
11:00				Stadium: Stadionul Eugen Popescu

19 September 2023 6	CSM Ceahlaul	1–1	Chindia Târgoviște	Piatra Neamț
17:00				Stadium: Stadionul Ceahlăul

23 September 2023 7	Chindia Târgoviște	4–0	CSC Dumbrăvița	Târgoviște
11:00				Stadium: Stadionul Eugen Popescu

30 September 2023 8	Csíkszereda	1–0	Chindia Târgoviște	Miercurea Ciuc
11:00				Stadium: Stadionul Municipal

7 October 2023 9	Chindia Târgoviște	3–0	AFC Progresul	Târgoviște
11:00				Stadium: Stadionul Eugen Popescu

22 October 2023 10	Corvinul Hunedoara	2–1	Chindia Târgoviște	Hunedoara
11:00				Stadium: Stadionul Michael Klein

28 October 2023 11	Chindia Târgoviște	4–1	CSM Reșița	Târgoviște
11:00				Stadium: Stadionul Eugen Popescu

4 November 2023 12	Viitorul Târgu Jiu	0–0	Chindia Târgoviște	Drobeta-Turnu Severin
11:00				Stadium: Stadionul Municipal

9 November 2023 13	Chindia Târgoviște	0–2	Mioveni	Târgoviște
19:30				Stadium: Stadionul Eugen Popescu

25 November 2023 14	Tunari	0–2	Chindia Târgoviște	Tunari
11:30				Stadium: Stadionul Comunal

3 December 2023 15	Chindia Târgoviște	1–1	Concordia Chiajna	Târgoviște
11:30 EET (UTC+1)				Stadium: Stadionul Eugen Popescu

24 February 2024 16	Chindia Târgoviște	v	Metaloglobus București	Târgoviște
--:-- EET (UTC+1)				Stadium: Stadionul Eugen Popescu

=== Cupa României ===
16 August 2023 Third round	CS Blejoi	0–5	Chindia Târgoviște	Blejoi
17:30 EEST (UTC+2)			Botogan 3', 35'; Blejdea 61', 79'; Călin 88'	Stadium: Stadionul Comunal

29 August 2023 Play-off round	Phoenix Buziaș	0–3	Chindia Târgoviște	Lugoj
17:30 EEST (UTC+2)				Stadium: Stadionul Tineretului

==== Group stage ====
27 September 2023 1	Corvinul Hunedoara	2–0	Chindia Târgoviște	Hunedoara
17:00 EET (UTC+1)				Stadium: Stadionul Michael Klein

31 October 2023 2	Chindia Târgoviște	0–2	Petrolul Ploiești	Târgoviște
18:00 EET (UTC+1)				Stadium: Stadionul Eugen Popescu

7 December 2023 3	Chindia Târgoviște	v	Hermannstadt	Târgoviște
17:00 EET (UTC+1)				Stadium: Stadionul Eugen Popescu
