= 2025–26 Liga I =

108th season of Liga I in Romania

Liga I
- Season: 2025–26
- Dates: 11 July 2025 – 25 May 2026
- Champions: Universitatea Craiova (5th title)
- Relegated: Metaloglobus București; Unirea Slobozia; Hermannstadt
- Champions League: Universitatea Craiova
- Europa League: Universitatea Cluj
- Conference League: CFR Cluj; FCSB
- Matches: 240
- Goals: 613 (2.55 per match)
- Top goalscorer: Jovo Lukić (18 goals)
- Biggest home win: Unirea Slobozia 6–1 Csíkszereda Miercurea Ciuc (21 July 2025); Universitatea Craiova 5–0 Csíkszereda Miercurea Ciuc (22 December 2025)
- Biggest away win: UTA 0–4 Oțelul Galați (19 October 2025)
- Highest scoring: Unirea Slobozia 6–1 Csíkszereda Miercurea Ciuc (21 July 2025); Dinamo Bucuresti 4–3 FCSB (2 August 2025)
- Longest winning run: CFR Cluj (11)
- Longest unbeaten run: CFR Cluj (14)
- Longest winless run: Metaloglobus București (12)
- Longest losing run: Unirea Slobozia (9)
- All statistics correct as of 24 May 2026.

The 2025–26 Liga I (also known as Superliga for sponsorship reasons) was the 108th season of Liga I, the top football league in Romania. It started on 11 July 2025 and it ended on 25 May 2026.

FCSB were the two-time defending champions having won their 28th top-flight title the previous season.

== Overview ==
Sixteen teams competed in the league — the thirteen teams from the previous season, two teams promoted directly from Liga II, and one team promoted via play-off.

=== Teams promoted from Liga II ===
Csíkszereda Miercurea Ciuc became the first team to be promoted after fellow promotion contenders Metaloglobus București earned a draw against Reșița on 25 April 2025. The result means Csíkszereda Miercurea Ciuc will compete in the top flight for the first time in their history.

Argeș Pitești became the second team to be promoted on 6 May 2025 after defeating Reșița in matchweek 8 of the promotion round. This result saw Argeș Pitești return to the top flight after a two-season absence.

Metaloglobus București became the third team to be promoted after defeating Politehnica Iași 2–1 on aggregate in the promotion/relegation play-off round on 1 June 2025. This result means that Metaloglobus București will compete in the top division for the first time in their history.

=== Teams relegated to Liga II ===
Gloria Buzău became the first team to be relegated after suffering a narrow defeat to Farul Constanța on 4 May 2025. This result ended Gloria Buzău's time in Liga I for one season.

Sepsi OSK became the second team to be relegated after suffering a defeat to Unirea Slobozia on 18 May 2025. This result ended Sepsi's time in Liga I for eight seasons.

Politehnica Iași became the third team to be relegated after defeat to Metaloglobus București 2–1 on aggregate in the promotion/relegation play-off round on 1 June 2025. This result ended Iași's time in Liga I for two seasons.

== Teams ==
=== Changes ===
The following teams changed division since the 2024–25 season.

▲ Promoted from Liga II	▼ Relegated to Liga II
Argeș Pitești; Csíkszereda Miercurea Ciuc; Metaloglobus București (via play-off)	Politehnica Iași (via play-off); Sepsi OSK; Gloria Buzău

=== Stadiums and locations ===
Locations of teams in the 2025–26 Liga I
Locations of teams in the 2025–26 Liga I from the Bucharest municipality

Team	Location	Stadium	Capacity	2024–25 season
Argeș Pitești^{↑}	Pitești	Orășenesc, at Mioveni (Note: Due to the ongoing renovation of Stadionul Nicolae Dobrin, Argeș Pitești will play their home matches at Orășenesc Stadium in Mioveni.)	11,000	1st in Liga II
Botoșani	Botoșani	Botoșani Municipal	7,782	12th in Liga I
CFR Cluj	Cluj-Napoca	Dr. Constantin Rădulescu	22,198	2nd in Liga I
Csíkszereda Miercurea Ciuc^{↑}	Miercurea Ciuc	Miercurea Ciuc Municipal	4,000	3rd in Liga II
Dinamo București	Bucharest	Arcul de Triumf	8,207	6th in Liga I
Farul Constanța	Ovidiu	Central Stadium of the Gheorghe Hagi	4,554	11th in Liga I
FCSB	Bucharest	Arena Națională	55,634	1st in Liga I
Hermannstadt	Sibiu	Sibiu Municipal	12,363	7th in Liga I
Metaloglobus București^{↑}	Bucharest	Clinceni (Note: Will play their home matches at Clinceni Stadium in Clinceni, instead of their regular stadium, Metaloglobus Stadium which do not meets LPF requirements.)	4,500	Promotion play-off winner
Oțelul Galați	Galați	Oțelul	13,500	8th in Liga I
Petrolul Ploiești	Ploiești	Ilie Oană	15,073	9th in Liga I
Rapid București	Bucharest	Superbet Arena-Giulești	14,047	5th in Liga I
Unirea Slobozia	Slobozia	May 1 Stadium	6,000	Relegation play-off winner
Universitatea Cluj	Cluj-Napoca	Cluj Arena	30,355	4th in Liga I
Universitatea Craiova	Craiova	Ion Oblemenco	30,983	3rd in Liga I
UTA Arad	Arad	Francisc von Neuman	11,500	10th in Liga I

^{↑}	Promoted from the Liga II

=== Personnel and kits ===
Note: Flags indicate national team as has been defined under FIFA eligibility rules. Players and Managers may hold more than one non-FIFA nationality.

Team	Manager	Captain	Kit manufacturer	Main Kit sponsor	Other kit sponsor(s)
Argeș Pitești	(Romania national football team) Bogdan Andone	(Romania national football team) Andrei Tofan	(Italy) Macron	Vlad Cazino	List: Front: Catena; Back: MetaBet CF, CreditFix; Sleeves: Carpatina, Pitești; Shorts: One Concept Distribution
Botoșani	(Romania national football team) Marius Croitoru	(Romania national football team) Andrei Miron	(Germany) Adidas	Unibet	List: Front: Elsaco; Back: None; Sleeves: None; Shorts: Vestra, Five Continents Group
CFR Cluj	(Romania national football team) Daniel Pancu	(Romania national football team) Mário Camora	(United States) Nike	Don	List: Front: None; Back: DSC; Sleeves: None; Shorts: None
Csíkszereda Miercurea Ciuc	(Romania national football team) Róbert Ilyés	(Romania national football team) Szilárd Vereș	(Hungary) 2Rule	MOL	List: Front: Csíkszereda; Back: None; Sleeves: None; Shorts: None
Dinamo București	(Croatia national football team) Željko Kopić	(Romania national football team) Cătălin Cîrjan	(Germany) Puma	Superbet	List: Front: Renovatio; Back: Hils; Sleeves: None; Shorts: None
Farul Constanța	(Romania national football team) Flavius Stoican	(Romania national football team) Ionuț Larie	(United States) Nike	Superbet	List: Front: None; Back: Murfatlar Vinul, Pepsi, Celco; Sleeves: Auchan; Shorts: Kirvad Tour, Mini
FCSB	(Romania) Marius Baciu	(Romania national football team) Darius Olaru	(United States) Nike	Betano	List: Front: Walter Tosto; Back: None; Sleeves: MG; Shorts: None
Hermannstadt	(Romania national football team) Dorinel Munteanu	(Romania national football team) Ionuț Stoica	(United States) Nike	Unibet	List: Front: Primăria Municipiului Sibiu; Back: Palplast, mobilaabc.ro, BRAMAC; Sleeves: Escudo, SAM Transport, Decathlon, Biotechnik; Shorts: Conlan, Natur House, ifm, ODU, Carpatina
Metaloglobus București	(Romania national football team) Florin Bratu	(Romania national football team) George Gavrilaș	(Germany) Jako	None	List: Front: None; Back: None; Sleeves: None; Shorts: None
Oțelul Galați	(Croatia) Stjepan Tomas	(Portugal national football team) João Lameira	(Germany) Adidas	Mr Bit	List: Front: Primăria Galați, Consiliului Judeţean Galaţi; Back: Liberty; Sleeves: Valgrig; Shorts: CreditFix
Petrolul Ploiești	(Turkey) Mehmet Topal	(Romania national football team) Gheorghe Grozav	(Italy) Macron	Mr Bit	List: Front: Actemium; Back: La Cocos; Sleeves: Carpatina; Shorts: None
Rapid București	(Romania national football team) Constantin Gâlcă	(Romania national football team) Alexandru Dobre	(Italy) Kappa	Superbet	List: Front: None; Back: Hoffman, Plus-Auto; Sleeves: None; Shorts: Sasha & Vlad, Dacris
Unirea Slobozia	(Romania national football team) Claudiu Niculescu	(Romania national football team) Constantin Toma	(Germany) Adidas	Mr Bit	List: Front: Sarapac Impex, Agro Oil Service, Consiliul Județean Ialomița, T&T Depo, Oyl Holding; Back: Premier Group, Avicola Slobozia, Avangarde Group; Sleeves: Artesans Del Sucre; Shorts: Andisol, Avantaj
Universitatea Cluj	(Italy national football team) Cristiano Bergodi	(Romania national football team) Alexandru Chipciu	(Germany) Adidas	Superbet	List: Front: AROBS; Back: Banca Transilvania, IRUM, AUTOKLASS, DeLonghi; Sleeves: Leier, Rematinvest; Shorts: Primăria Cluj-Napoca, Visit Cluj, Clinica Sante
Universitatea Craiova	(Portugal national football team) Filipe Coelho	(Romania national football team) Nicușor Bancu	(Germany) Puma	Superbet	List: Front: None; Back: Oscar; Sleeves: Damila; Shorts: Devin, Vectrum
UTA Arad	(Romania national football team) Adrian Mihalcea	(Romania national football team) Alexandru Benga	(United States) Nike	Favbet	List: Front: Verbita; Back: Diva Sol; Sleeves: CBA; Shorts: Pizza 5 Colțuri, DEY Security Arad

=== Managerial changes ===
==== Pre-season ====
Team	Outgoing manager	Manner	Date of vacancy	Replaced by	Date of arrival
Rapid București	(Romania) Octavian Chihaia	End of caretaker role	24 May 2025	(Romania) Constantin Gâlcă	3 June 2025
UTA Arad	(Romania) Mircea Rednic	Signed by (Belgium) Standard Liège	24 May 2025	(Romania) Adrian Mihalcea	5 June 2025
Unirea Slobozia	(Romania) Adrian Mihalcea	Signed by UTA Arad	24 May 2025	(Romania) Andrei Prepeliță	7 June 2025
Petrolul Ploiești	(Turkey) Mehmet Topal	End of contract	24 May 2025	(Romania) Liviu Ciobotariu	9 June 2025
Farul Constanța	(Romania) Gheorghe Hagi	Resigned as manager	2 June 2025	(Romania) Ianis Zicu	3 June 2025
Metaloglobus București	(Romania) Ianis Zicu	Signed by Farul Constanța	3 June 2025	(Romania) Mihai Teja	14 June 2025

==== During the season ====
Team	Outgoing manager	Manner	Date of vacancy	Week	Position in table		Replaced by	Date of appointment
Team	Outgoing manager	Manner	Date of vacancy	Week	Round	Position	Replaced by	Date of appointment
CFR Cluj	(Romanian Football Federation) Dan Petrescu	Resigned	21 August 2025	6	Regular season	13th	(Italian Football Federation) Andrea Mandorlini	22 August 2025
Petrolul Ploiesti	(Romanian Football Federation) Liviu Ciobotariu	Sacked	16 September 2025	9	Regular season	14th	(Romanian Football Federation) Eugen Neagoe	23 September 2025
CFR Cluj	(Italian Football Federation) Andrea Mandorlini	Sacked	25 October 2025	14	Regular season	13th	(Romanian Football Federation) Daniel Pancu	31 October 2025
Universitatea Cluj	(Romanian Football Federation) Ioan Ovidiu Sabău	Sacked	28 October 2025	14	Regular season	9th	(Italian Football Federation) Cristiano Bergodi	29 October 2025
Universitatea Craiova	(Romanian Football Federation) Mirel Rădoi	Resigned	10 November 2025	16	Regular season	4th	(Portuguese Football Federation) Filipe Coelho	11 November 2025
FC Hermannstadt	(Romanian Football Federation) Marius Măldărășanu	Resigned	4 December 2025	18	Regular season	15th	(Romanian Football Federation) Dorinel Munteanu	8 December 2025
Unirea Slobozia	(Romanian Football Federation) Andrei Prepeliță	Sacked	4 February 2026	25	Regular season	13th	(Romanian Football Federation) Claudiu Niculescu	4 February 2026
Metaloglobus Bucuresti	(Romanian Football Federation) Mihai Teja	Resigned	2 March 2026	29	Regular season	16th	(Romanian Football Federation) Florin Bratu	5 March 2026
FC Botosani	(Romanian Football Federation) Leo Grozavu	Sacked	4 March 2026	29	Regular season	8th	(Romanian Football Federation) Marius Croitoru	8 March 2026
FCSB	(Cyprus Football Association) Elias Charalambous	Resigned	7 March 2026	30	Regular season	7th	(Romanian Football Federation) Mirel Rădoi	10 March 2026
Oțelul Galați	(Romanian Football Federation) László Balint	Resigned	15 March 2026	31	Play-offs	5th	(Croatian Football Federation) Stjepan Tomas	17 March 2026
Petrolul Ploiești	(Romanian Football Federation) Eugen Neagoe	Resigned	25 March 2026	32	Play-offs	13th	(Turkish Football Federation) Mehmet Topal	28 March 2026
Farul Constanța	(Romanian Football Federation) Ianis Zicu	Resigned	13 April 2026	34	Play-offs	11th	(Romanian Football Federation) Flavius Stoican	13 April 2026
FCSB	(Romanian Football Federation) Mirel Rădoi	Signed by (Turkey) Gaziantep	21 April 2026	35	Play-offs	7th	(Romanian Football Federation) Lucian Filip (interim)	22 April 2026
FCSB	(Romanian Football Federation) Lucian Filip (interim)	End of interim period	19 May 2026	40	European Play-off	8th	(Romanian Football Federation) Marius Baciu	19 May 2026

== Regular season ==
=== League table ===
Pos	Team	Pld	W	D	L	GF	GA	GD	Pts	Qualification
1	Universitatea Craiova	30	17	9	4	53	27	+26	60	Advances to Play-off
2	Rapid București	30	16	8	6	47	30	+17	56	Advances to Play-off
3	Universitatea Cluj	30	16	6	8	48	27	+21	54	Advances to Play-off
4	CFR Cluj	30	15	8	7	49	40	+9	53	Advances to Play-off
5	Dinamo București	30	14	10	6	42	28	+14	52	Advances to Play-off
6	Argeș Pitești	30	15	5	10	37	28	+9	50	Advances to Play-off
7	FCSB	30	13	7	10	48	40	+8	46	Advances to Play-out
8	UTA Arad	30	11	10	9	39	44	−5	43	Advances to Play-out
9	Botoșani	30	11	9	10	37	29	+8	42	Advances to Play-out
10	Oțelul Galați	30	11	8	11	39	32	+7	41	Advances to Play-out
11	Farul Constanța	30	10	7	13	39	37	+2	37	Advances to Play-out
12	Petrolul Ploiești	30	7	11	12	24	31	−7	32	Advances to Play-out
13	Csíkszereda Miercurea Ciuc	30	8	8	14	30	58	−28	32	Advances to Play-out
14	Unirea Slobozia	30	7	4	19	27	46	−19	25	Advances to Play-out
15	Hermannstadt	30	5	8	17	29	50	−21	23	Advances to Play-out
16	Metaloglobus București	30	2	6	22	25	66	−41	12	Advances to Play-out

Source: LPF (in Romanian)
Rules for classification: 1) Points; 2) Head-to-head points; 3) Head-to-head goal difference; 4) Head-to-head goals scored; 5) Goal difference; 6) Goals scored; 7) Play-off.

=== Results ===
Home \ Away	UCV	RAP	UCJ	CFR	DIN	ARG	FCS	UTA	BOT	OTE	FAR	PET	CSI	USL	HER	MET
Universitatea Craiova		2–2	2–1	1–1	2–2	3–1	1–0	1–2	2–0	1–0	2–0	2–0	5–0	3–1	1–0	2–1
Rapid București	1–1		0–2	1–1	2–1	2–0	2–2	2–0	2–1	0–2	3–1	1–1	4–1	4–1	1–2	1–0
Universitatea Cluj	0–0	0–0		2–2	0–1	3–1	0–2	1–1	0–2	4–0	1–0	1–1	4–1	1–0	3–0	3–1
CFR Cluj	2–3	3–0	2–3		2–0	0–2	2–2	1–1	3–3	1–0	0–2	2–1	3–1	2–1	2–1	4–2
Dinamo București	1–1	0–2	1–0	2–1		0–1	4–3	1–1	0–0	1–0	1–1	1–1	4–0	1–0	2–0	4–0
Argeș Pitești	1–2	0–2	1–0	3–0	1–1		1–0	0–1	0–0	2–0	1–0	0–1	3–1	0–0	3–1	2–1
FCSB	1–0	2–1	1–3	4–1	0–0	0–2		4–0	2–1	1–0	1–2	1–1	1–0	0–1	1–1	4–1
UTA Arad	3–3	1–2	0–2	0–1	2–0	3–3	2–4		2–1	0–4	2–1	1–0	0–0	1–1	1–0	2–0
Botoșani	1–1	0–0	1–3	0–1	1–1	3–1	3–1	2–1		0–0	1–1	0–1	3–1	4–0	2–0	3–0
Oțelul Galați	1–0	1–1	1–2	4–1	2–1	2–1	1–4	2–2	0–1		2–2	0–0	3–0	3–0	0–2	4–0
Farul Constanța	4–1	3–1	0–1	1–2	2–3	0–0	1–2	1–1	2–0	3–2		2–1	3–0	1–1	1–1	2–1
Petrolul Ploiești	0–4	0–1	0–1	1–0	0–3	2–1	0–1	1–2	0–0	0–0	0–1		1–1	1–0	1–1	4–1
Csíkszereda Miercurea Ciuc	1–2	0–2	2–1	2–2	2–2	0–2	1–1	2–0	1–0	1–1	1–0	1–1		2–1	2–1	2–2
Unirea Slobozia	0–3	1–2	0–1	0–1	0–1	0–1	0–2	1–3	0–1	0–0	2–1	1–0	6–1		2–3	2–1
Hermannstadt	0–2	0–3	2–2	0–1	1–2	0–1	3–3	1–2	3–1	1–3	1–0	1–1	0–2	0–2		2–2
Metaloglobus București	0–0	1–2	1–4	1–1	0–1	0–2	2–1	2–2	0–2	0–1	2–1	0–3	0–1	2–3	1–1	

Source: LPF (in Romanian)
Legend: Blue = home team win; Yellow = draw; Red = away team win.
For upcoming matches, an "a" indicates there is an article about the rivalry between the two participants.

=== Positions by round ===
Team ╲ Round	1	2	3	4	5	6	7	8	9	10	11	12	13	14	15	16	17	18	19	20	21	22	23	24	25	26	27	28	29	30
Universitatea Craiova	5	2	2	2	1	1	1	1	3	3	3	3	3	3	3	4	3	4	4	4	1	1	1	1	1	1	1	1	1	1
Rapid București	2	3	1	1	2	2	2	2	2	2	2	2	2	2	2	1	1	1	1	1	2	2	2	3	2	2	3	3	2	2
Universitatea Cluj	1	1	6	7	8	7	9	9	10	10	10	10	10	9	11	10	8	10	8	7	7	8	7	6	4	6	4	4	4	3
CFR Cluj	10	5	9	12	12	12	13	13	11	11	11	11	11	13	13	12	11	12	11	11	11	10	9	9	7	7	5	5	5	4
Dinamo București	6	10	13	8	6	8	6	3	4	4	4	4	4	4	4	3	4	3	3	2	4	3	3	2	3	3	2	2	3	5
Argeș Pitești	15	16	12	5	10	9	5	4	5	5	5	5	5	5	5	5	5	5	5	5	5	5	4	4	5	4	6	6	6	6
FCSB	3	6	10	13	13	13	14	14	12	12	12	12	12	10	8	9	10	9	10	9	9	9	11	11	10	8	10	7	7	7
UTA Arad	4	8	5	4	3	3	3	5	8	8	8	8	9	11	9	8	9	7	6	8	8	6	8	7	8	9	8	9	9	8
Botoșani	8	11	4	6	5	6	4	6	1	1	1	1	1	1	1	2	2	2	2	3	3	4	5	5	6	5	7	8	8	9
Oțelul Galați	12	12	8	9	9	11	10	10	7	7	7	7	6	6	6	7	7	8	7	6	6	7	6	8	9	10	9	10	10	10
Farul Constanța	11	4	3	3	4	5	8	8	9	9	9	9	8	7	7	6	6	6	9	10	10	11	10	10	11	11	11	11	11	11
Petrolul Ploiești	13	13	7	10	11	10	12	12	14	14	14	14	13	12	12	13	13	11	12	12	13	13	13	12	12	12	12	12	12	12
Csíkszereda Miercurea Ciuc	7	15	16	16	16	16	16	16	15	15	15	15	14	14	14	14	14	14	14	14	14	14	14	14	13	13	13	13	13	13
Unirea Slobozia	14	7	11	11	7	4	7	7	6	6	6	6	7	8	10	11	12	13	13	13	12	12	12	13	14	14	14	14	14	14
Hermannstadt	9	9	14	14	14	14	11	11	13	13	13	13	15	15	15	15	15	15	15	15	15	15	15	15	15	15	15	15	15	15
Metaloglobus București	16	14	15	15	15	15	15	15	16	16	16	16	16	16	16	16	16	16	16	16	16	16	16	16	16	16	16	16	16	16

Leader and Qualification for the Play-off round
Qualification to the Play-off
Qualification to the Play-out

Source: LPF (in Romanian)

== Play-off round ==
The top six teams from Regular season will meet twice (10 matches per team) for places in UEFA Champions League and UEFA Conference League as well as deciding the league champion. Teams start the Championship round with their points from the Regular season halved, rounded upwards, and no other records carried over from the Regular season.

=== Play-off table ===
Pos	Team	Pld	W	D	L	GF	GA	GD	Pts	Qualification	UCV	UCJ	CFR	DIN	RAP	ARG
1	Universitatea Craiova (C)	10	6	2	2	12	6	+6	50	Qualification to Champions League first qualifying round		5–0	2–0	2–1	1–0	0–1
2	Universitatea Cluj	10	6	1	3	13	11	+2	46	Qualification to Europa League first qualifying round (Note: The winner of the 2025–26 Cupa României (Universitatea Craiova) qualifies for the Europa League first qualifying round. Since the champions won the cup, this berth passed to the second place team.)	4–0		2–1	1–1	1–0	1–0
3	CFR Cluj	10	4	4	2	8	7	+1	43	Qualification to Conference League second qualifying round	0–0	1–0		1–1	1–0	1–1
4	Dinamo București	10	3	4	3	13	12	+1	39	Qualification to European competition play-offs	0–1	2–1	0–0		3–1	2–1
5	Rapid București	10	1	3	6	8	14	−6	34		0–0	1–2	1–2	3–2		0–0
6	Argeș Pitești	10	1	4	5	6	10	−4	32		0–1	0–1	0–1	1–1	2–2	

Source: LPF (in Romanian)
Rules for classification: 1) Points; 2) Points without rounding; 3) Points in the regular season; 4) Head-to-head points; 5) Head-to-head goal difference; 6) Head-to-head goals scored; 7) Goal difference; 8) Goals scored; 9) Play-off (only if needed to decide champion or teams for UEFA competitions). (Note: only criteria 7 and 8 are applied to establish the classification during the competition.
(C) Champions

== Play-out round ==
The bottom ten teams from the regular season meet once to contest against relegation. Teams started the play-out round with their points from the Regular season halved, rounded upwards, and no other records carried over from the Regular season. The winner of the Relegation round finish 7th in the overall season standings, the second placed team – 8th, and so on, with the last placed team in the Relegation round being 16th.

=== Play-out table ===
Pos	Team	Pld	W	D	L	GF	GA	GD	Pts	Qualification or relegation	UTA	FCS	OTE	BOT	CSI	PET	FAR	HER	UNS	MET
7	UTA Arad (Note: UTA Arad and Oțelul Galați were ineligible to qualify for the European competition play-offs because they did not obtain a UEFA license.)	9	5	2	2	14	7	+7	39					3–1	1–0		0–0	3–2		5–1
8	FCSB (O)	9	4	2	3	13	9	+4	37	Qualification to European competition play-offs	1–0		4–0			3–1			0–0	0–0
9	Oțelul Galați	9	4	2	3	17	15	+2	35		1–0				2–3		3–2	2–0		2–2
10	Botoșani	9	3	3	3	13	17	−4	33 (Note: Botoșani is ahead of Csíkszereda Miercurea Ciuc on points from the regular season.)	Qualification to European competition play-offs		3–2	1–1			1–1			3–2	3–2
11	Csíkszereda Miercurea Ciuc	9	5	2	2	11	8	+3	33			1–0		2–0			1–1		3–2	
12	Petrolul Ploiești	9	2	3	4	9	15	−6	25		1–1		1–5		2–0			1–1		
13	Farul Constanța (O)	9	1	3	5	8	11	−3	25	Qualification to relegation play-offs		2–3		1–1		2–0			0–1	0–1
14	Hermannstadt (R)	9	3	4	2	13	10	+3	25	Dissolved		2–0		3–0	0–0		1–0			
15	Unirea Slobozia (R)	9	2	3	4	11	13	−2	22	Relegated to Liga II	0–1		2–1			1–2		2–2		
16	Metaloglobus București (R)	9	2	4	3	10	14	−4	16	Relegated to Liga II					0–1	1–0		2–2	1–1	

Source: LPF (in Romanian)
Rules for classification: 1) Points; 2) Points without rounding; 3) Points in the regular season; 4) Head-to-head points; 5) Head-to-head goal difference; 6) Head-to-head goals scored; 7) Goal difference; 8) Goals scored; 9) Play-off (only if needed to decide champion or teams for UEFA competitions). (Note: only criteria 7 and 8 are applied to establish the classification during the competition.
(O) Play-off winners; (R) Relegated

== European play-offs ==
In the semi-final the 7th and 8th-placed teams of the Liga I typically play a one-legged match on the ground of the better placed team (7th place). In the final, the winner of the play-out semi-final will play the highest ranked team of the play-off tournament, that did not already qualify for European competitions. The winner of the final will enter the second qualifying round of the Conference League.

=== Bracket ===
Semi-final			Final
			4	Dinamo București	1
8	FCSB (a.e.t.)	4	8	FCSB	2
10	Botoșani	3

=== Matches ===
European play-off semi-final

24 May 2026	FCSB	4–3 (a.e.t.)	Botoșani	Bucharest
20:30 UTC+3	João Paulo 20'; Dawa 53'; Tănase 69' (pen.); O. Popescu 107'	Report	Mailat 14', 77' (pen.); Kovtalyuk 90+4'	Stadium: Steaua; Attendance: 10,341; Referee: István Kovács

European play-off final

29 May 2026	Dinamo București	1–2 (a.e.t.)	FCSB	Bucharest
20:30 UTC+3	Karamoko 73'	Report	Dawa 10'; Arad 107'	Stadium: Arcul de Triumf; Attendance: 6,778; Referee: Marian Barbu

== Promotion/relegation play-offs ==
The 13th- and 14th-placed teams of Liga I faced the 3rd- and 4th-placed teams of Liga II.

=== Summary ===
Team 1	Agg.	Team 2	1st leg	2nd leg
Chindia Târgoviște	4−4 (2−4 p)	Farul Constanța	3−3	1−1
Hermannstadt	3–5	Voluntari	3−2	0–3

=== Matches ===
23 May 2026	Chindia Târgoviște	3−3	Farul Constanța	Târgoviște
17:30 UTC+3	Popadiuc 22'; Florea 71'; Pešić 80'	Report	Alibec 53'; Ișfan 58'; Marković 89'	Stadium: Eugen Popescu; Referee: Marcel Bîrsan

24 May 2026	Hermannstadt	3–2	Voluntari	Sibiu
17:30 UTC+3	Neguț 27'; Balaure 45'; Buș 48'	Report	Roman 53'; Crișan 55'	Stadium: Sibiu Municipal; Attendance: 6,867; Referee: Horațiu Feșnic

31 May 2026	Farul Constanța	1−1 (a.e.t.) (4−2 p)	Chindia Târgoviște	Ovidiu
20:30 UTC+3	Radaslavescu 56'	Report	Florea 8'	Stadium: Central Stadium (Gheorghe Hagi Academy); Referee: Rareș George Vidican
	Penalties
	Alibec (penalty scored); Sîrbu (penalty scored); Cojocaru (penalty scored); Grigoryan (penalty scored)		(penalty missed) Pandele; (penalty scored) Mihai; (penalty missed) Roșu; (penalty scored) Celea

1 June 2026	Voluntari	3–0	Hermannstadt	Voluntari
20:30 UTC+3	Matko Babić 50' (pen.), 75' (pen.); Cătălin Tolea 90+8'	Report		Stadium: Anghel Iordănescu Stadium; Referee: Kovacs Szabolcs

== Season statistics ==
=== Top scorers ===
As of 17 May 2026

Rank	Player	Team	Goals
1	(Bosnia and Herzegovina) Jovo Lukić	Universitatea Cluj	18
2	(Romania) Alexandru Dobre	Rapid București	15
2	(Romania) Florin Tănase	FCSB	15
4	(Romania) Andrei Cordea	CFR Cluj	13
5	(Hungary) Márton Eppel	Csíkszereda Miercurea Ciuc	12
5	(Romania) Sebastian Mailat	Botoșani	12
7	(Palestine) Assad Al Hamlawi	Universitatea Craiova	11
7	(Tunisia) Adel Bettaieb	Argeș Pitești	11
9	(Romania) Alexandru Ișfan	Farul Constanța	10
9	(Portugal) Ricardo Matos	Argeș Pitești	10
9	(France) Steven Nsimba	Universitatea Craiova	10
9	(Romania) Darius Olaru	FCSB	10

=== Clean sheets ===
As of 25 May 2026

Rank	Player	Team	Clean sheet
1	(Romania) David Lazar	Argeș Pitești/Hermannstadt	16
2	(Lithuania) Edvinas Gertmonas	Universitatea Cluj	13
3	(Romania) Cosmin Dur-Bozoancă	Oțelul Galați	12
3	(Romania) Laurențiu Popescu	Universitatea Craiova	12
5	(Greece) Giannis Anestis	Botoșani	10
5	(Romania) Eduard Pap	Csíkszereda Miercurea Ciuc	10
7	(Romania) Marian Aioani	Rapid București	9
7	(Cameroon) Devis Epassy	Dinamo București	9
7	(Romania) Ștefan Târnovanu	FCSB	9
10	(Romania) Mihai Popa	CFR Cluj	8

=== Hat-tricks ===
As of 14 December 2025

Player	For	Against	Result	Date	Round
(Scotland) Daniel Armstrong	Dinamo București	FCSB	4–3 (H)	2 August 2025	4
(Romania) Florin Tănase	FCSB	Dinamo București	4–3 (A)	2 August 2025	4
(Cape Verde) Patrick	Oțelul Galați	CFR Cluj	4-1 (H)	24 August 2025	7
(Bosnia and Herzegovina) Jovo Lukić	Universitatea Cluj	Hermannstadt	3-0 (H)	7 December 2025	19
(Romania) Andrei Cordea	CFR Cluj	Csíkszereda Miercurea Ciuc	3-1 (H)	12 December 2025	20

== Champion squad ==
CS Universitatea Craiova

Goalkeepers: Pavlo Isenko (Ukraine) (18 / 0); Silviu Lung Jr. (5 / 0); Laurențiu Popescu (18 / 0)
Defenders: Juraj Badelj (Croatia) (12 / 1); Nicușor Bancu (30 / 1); Gabriel Fălcușan (1 / 0); Florin Gașpăr (1 / 0); Basilio Ndong (Equatorial Guinea) (1 / 0); Vasile Mogoș (14 / 0); Carlos Mora (Costa Rica) (29 / 2); Florin Ștefan (18 / 0); Oleksandr Romanchuk (Ukraine) (32 / 3); Adrian Rus (26 / 2); Nikola Stevanović (Serbia) (15 / 1)
Midfielders: Tudor Băluță (31 / 1); Luca Băsceanu (22 / 2); Alexandru Cicâldău (33 / 3); Alexandru Crețu (20 / 1); Lyes Houri (France) (16 / 0); David Matei (31 / 4); Anzor Mekvabishvili (Georgia (country)) (33 / 3); Mihnea Rădulescu (13 / 2); Samuel Teles (Portugal) (32 / 2)
Forwards: Assad Al Hamlawi (Palestine) (33 / 11); Ștefan Baiaram (37 / 7); David Barbu (6 / 0); Andrei Ivan (2 / 1); Monday Etim (Nigeria) (27 / 4); Jovan Marković (1 / 0); Denys Muntean (1 / 0); Steven Nsimba (France) (34 / 10); Luis Paradela (Cuba) (2 / 0)
(league appearances and goals listed in brackets)

Manager: Mirel Rădoi / Filipe Coelho (Portugal)

== Awards ==
Award	Winner	Club
Manager of the Season	(Portugal) Filipe Coelho	Universitatea Craiova

Team of the Season
Goalkeeper	(Lithuania) Edvinas Gertmonas (Universitatea Cluj)			
Defence	(Costa Rica) Carlos Mora (Universitatea Craiova)	(Togo) Kennedy Boateng (Dinamo București)	(Ukraine) Oleksandr Romanchuk (Universitatea Craiova)	(Romania) Raul Opruț (Dinamo București)
Midfield	(Ivory Coast) Issouf Macalou (Universitatea Cluj)	(Georgia (country)) Anzor Mekvabishvili (Universitatea Craiova)	(Romania) Cătălin Cîrjan (Dinamo București)	(Kosovo) Meriton Korenica (CFR Cluj)
Attack	(Palestine) Assad Al Hamlawi (Universitatea Craiova)		(Bosnia and Herzegovina) Jovo Lukić (Universitatea Cluj)	

== Attendances ==
=== Overall ===
As of 25 May 2026

Pos	Team	Total	High	Low	Average	Change
1	Argeș Pitești	72,888	6,000	1,701	3,644	n/a^{†}
2	Botoșani	70,762	6,972	614	3,538	+9.8%
3	CFR Cluj	105,595	11,000	1,132	5,279	+17.3%
4	Csíkszereda Miercurea Ciuc	28,768	4,000	500	1,514	n/a^{†}
5	Dinamo București†	203,857	34,700	4,600	10,192	−22.3%
6	Farul Constanța	57,412	4,128	1,137	2,870	+4.0%
7	FCSB†	174,501	30,903	2,456	8,309	−25.5%
8	Hermannstadt	76,760	6,867	1,861	3,838	−5.3%
9	Metaloglobus București	12,005	3,200	78	631	n/a^{†}
10	Oțelul Galați	97,859	10,000	2,044	4,892	−12.1%
11	Petrolul Ploiești	81,020	10,000	1,760	4,264	−31.0%
12	Rapid București†	198,065	26,871	1,979	9,903	−12.6%
13	Unirea Slobozia†	30,498	4,180	216	1,605	+43.8%
14	Universitatea Cluj†	169,369	20,155	1,850	8,468	−10.4%
15	Universitatea Craiova	322,437	27,810	4,537	15,506	+70.1%
16	UTA Arad	124,206	10,347	3,783	6,210	−14.4%
	League total	1,831,065	34,700	78	5,776	−11.6%

Source: LPF
Notes:
^{†} 1) Teams played previous season in Liga II 2) Dinamo București played 4 home matches at Arcul de Triumf Stadium 3) FCSB played 5 home matches at Steaua Stadium 4) Rapid București played 2 home matches at Arena Națională 5) Unirea Slobozia played 10 home matches at Clinceni Stadium 6) Universitatea Cluj played one home match at Sibiu Municipal Stadium

=== Home match played ===
Team \ Match played	Regular season															Play-off & Play-out					Other	Total
Team \ Match played	1	2	3	4	5	6	7	8	9	10	11	12	13	14	15	1	2	3	4	5	Other	Total
Argeș Pitești	6.000	3.611	4.170	2.500	4.000	3.000	5.200	3.700	2.018	3.186	3.972	2.402	1.701	3.672	3.525	4.288	4.561	3.372	4.542	3.468		72.888
Botoșani	4.612	3.480	4.216	4.320	6.000	6.972	2.614	4.364	6.166	5.416	3.812	614	1.013	2.316	2.083	1.512	5.174	1.033	1.646	3.399		70.762
CFR Cluj	3.882	2.884	3.633	1.800	11.000	4.114	2.480	2.500	6.455	2.319	1.132	1.350	9.538	3.117	8.450	8.103	5.809	10.108	9.068	7.853		105.595
Csíkszereda Miercurea Ciuc	4.000	2.150	1.988	1.897	1.500	2.000	1.598	1.500	1.424	924	862	500	1.088	889	1.250	1.089	1.214	1.713	1.182	-		28.768
Dinamo București	6.800	23.215	10.912	8.021	11.176	34.700	8.741	8.792	4.800	8.200	4.600	5.100	15.548	5.923	10.385	8.954	8.420	12.970	5.063	6.600		203.857
Farul Constanța	3.382	3.486	4.083	4.000	3.000	2.986	2.674	2.000	4.038	2.067	1.137	2.148	3.819	3.948	2.866	2.784	2.684	4.128	2.388	2.478		57.412
FCSB	6.000	7.514	6.083	8.700	5.130	11.403	5.187	8.105	28.510	30.903	5.500	2.642	3.344	2.456	5.024	7.543	5.211	4.039	6.363	4.503	10.341	174.501
Hermannstadt	3.517	6.238	5.230	2.875	3.000	2.200	2.745	8.351	2.225	2.923	2.190	5.786	3.870	2.585	1.861	2.537	2.124	3.078	6.558	-	6.867	76.760
Metaloglobus București	386	750	3.200	2.432	250	78	1.630	1.116	110	328	269	208	103	215	348	460	176	190	122	-		12.005
Oțelul Galați	6.262	9.996	10.000	5.729	5.000	5.511	2.025	5.571	4.378	2.748	3.711	2.044	9.140	3.064	4.510	3.450	3.181	3.627	3.188	4.724		97.859
Petrolul Ploiești	10.000	4.313	3.823	7.884	7.251	2.898	3.140	2.500	3.108	2.745	1.760	2.281	1.553	3.072	4.039	3.586	5.285	5.234	6.548	-		81.020
Rapid București	11.271	12.000	26.871	11.708	10.123	9.092	10.182	9.268	7.458	8.137	6.138	8.179	8.117	13.728	12.600	12.478	7.427	1.979	6.182	5.127		198.065
Unirea Slobozia	300	398	400	500	1.000	1.500	630	340	216	1.400	2.801	1.420	1.410	3.370	4.180	3.010	3.000	2.010	2.613	-		30.498
Universitatea Cluj	8.000	1.850	13.354	8.732	14.066	4.112	14.691	2.876	5.217	3.226	4.026	2.489	3.437	3.355	12.450	20.155	15.116	7.653	15.043	9.521		169.369
Universitatea Craiova	10.000	10.302	13.500	16.263	16.784	22.440	8.676	18.574	10.842	23.350	9.368	6.915	4.537	25.026	14.520	14.611	19.754	23.234	25.121	27.810		322.437
UTA Arad	7.348	6.146	8.779	6.953	6.362	6.000	7.000	4.856	4.273	4.018	9.841	9.312	5.872	3.783	10.347	4.363	4.422	4.957	5.237	4.337		124.206
League total																						1.831.065

Source: LPF

== See also ==
- 2025–26 Liga II
- 2025–26 Liga III
- 2025–26 Liga IV
- 2025–26 Cupa României
