= Daniel Popa =

Romanian footballer

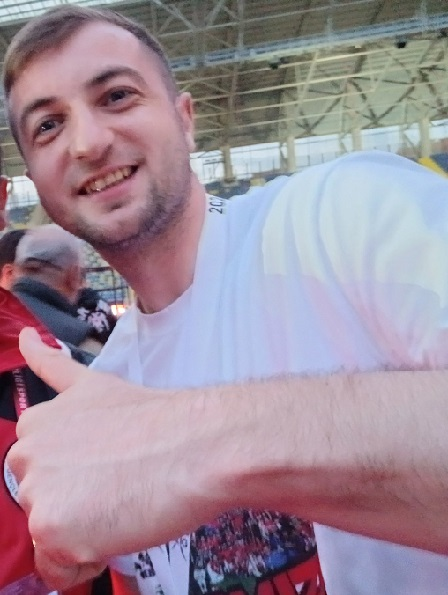
- Popa with Gençlerbirliği in 2025

Personal information
- Full name: Iliuță Daniel Popa
- Date of birth: 14 July 1995 (age 31)
- Place of birth: Pietroșița, Romania
- Height: 1.86 m (6 ft 1 in)
- Position: Forward

Youth career
- Grup Școlar Agricol Nucet
- –2012: Atletic Fieni

Senior career*
Years	Team	Apps	(Gls)
2012–2014	FCM Târgoviște	55	(20)
2014–2016	Chindia Târgoviște	31	(16)
2016–2021	Dinamo București	92	(14)
2017	→ Botoșani (loan)	20	(1)
2020–2021	→ Chindia Târgoviște (loan)	34	(7)
2021–2022	Chindia Târgoviște	24	(5)
2022	Daejeon Hana Citizen	9	(0)
2022–2023	Chindia Târgoviște	37	(9)
2023–2024	Universitatea Cluj	36	(11)
2024–2025	FCSB	15	(0)
2025	Gençlerbirliği	16	(8)
2026	Metaloglobus București	7	(1)

International career
2016	Romania U21	1	(0)
- * Club domestic league appearances and goals as of 5 April 2026

Iliuță Daniel Popa (born 14 July 1995) is a Romanian professional footballer who plays as a forward.

== Career statistics ==
As of match played 5 April 2026

Appearances and goals by club, season and competition
Club	Season	League			National cup (Note: Includes Cupa României)		Continental		Other		Total	
Club	Season	Division	Apps	Goals	Apps	Goals	Apps	Goals	Apps	Goals	Apps	Goals
FCM Târgoviște	2012–13	Liga III	—		—		—		—		—	
FCM Târgoviște	2013–14	Liga III	—		—		—		—		—	
FCM Târgoviște	Total		55	20	—		—		—		55	20
Chindia Târgoviște	2014–15	Liga III	—		1	0	—		—		1	0
Chindia Târgoviște	2015–16	Liga II	31	16	—		—		—		31	16
Chindia Târgoviște	Total		31	16	1	0	—		—		32	16
Dinamo București	2016–17	Liga I	11	0	3	0	—		3 (Note: Appearance in Cupa Ligii)	3	17	3
Dinamo București	2017–18	Liga I	16	8	1	0	—		—		17	8
Dinamo București	2018–19	Liga I	30	2	1	0	—		—		31	2
Dinamo București	2019–20	Liga I	33	4	4	0	—		—		37	4
Dinamo București	2020–21	Liga I	2	0	—		—		—		2	0
Dinamo București	Total		92	14	9	0	—		3	3	104	17
Botoșani (loan)	2017–18	Liga I	20	1	2	0	—		—		22	1
Chindia Târgoviște (loan)	2020–21	Liga I	34	7	1	0	—		1 (Note: Appearance in Liga I European play-offs)	1	36	8
Chindia Târgoviște	2021–22	Liga I	24	5	2	1	—		—		26	6
Chindia Târgoviște	Total		59	13	3	1	—		—		62	14
Daejeon Hana Citizen	2022	K League 2	9	0	—		—		—		9	0
Chindia Târgoviște	2022–23	Liga I	37	9	1	1	—		—		38	10
Universitatea Cluj	2023–24	Liga I	36	11	6	0	—		—		42	11
FCSB	2024–25	Liga I	15	0	2	0	12 (Note: Five appearances and two goals in UEFA Champions League, seven appearances in UEFA Europa League)	2	1 (Note: Appearance in Supercupa României)	0	30	2
Gençlerbirliği	2024–25	TFF 1. Lig	15	8	—		—		—		15	8
Gençlerbirliği	2025–26	Süper Lig	1	0	—		—		—		1	0
Gençlerbirliği	Total		16	8	—		—		—		16	8
Metaloglobus București	2025–26	Liga I	7	1	—		—		—		7	1
Career total			376	92	24	2	12	2	5	4	417	100

== Honours ==
Chindia Târgoviște

- Liga III: 2014–15

Dinamo București

- Cupa Ligii: 2016–17

FCSB

- Liga I: 2024–25
- Supercupa României: 2024
