= Sfârcea =

Sfârcea may refer to several villages in Romania:

- Sfârcea, a village in Întregalde Commune, Alba County
- Sfârcea, a village in Braloștița Commune, Dolj County
