= Tiberiu Căpușă =

Romanian association football player

Personal information
- Full name: Tiberiu Ionuț Căpușă
- Date of birth: 6 April 1998 (age 28)
- Place of birth: Bacău, Romania
- Height: 1.83 m (6 ft 0 in)
- Position: Right back

Team information
- Current team: Petrolul Ploiești
- Number: 66

Youth career
- –2009: FCM Bacău
- 2009–2017: Gheorghe Hagi Academy

Senior career*
| Years | Team | Apps | (Gls) |
| 2017–2021 | Viitorul Constanța | 9 | (0) |
| 2018–2019 | → Universitatea Cluj (loan) | 15 | (0) |
| 2020–2021 | → Chindia Târgoviște (loan) | 33 | (1) |
| 2021–2023 | Chindia Târgoviște | 67 | (1) |
| 2023–2024 | UTA Arad | 29 | (2) |
| 2024–2026 | Hermannstadt | 63 | (1) |
| 2026– | Petrolul Ploiești | 15 | (0) |

International career
| 2014–2015 | Romania U17 | 3 | (0) |
| 2016 | Romania U18 | 1 | (0) |
| 2016–2017 | Romania U19 | 5 | (0) |
| 2017–2018 | Romania U21 | 3 | (0) |
| 2021 | Romania | 1 | (0) |
- * Club domestic league appearances and goals as of 6 November 2026

Tiberiu Ionuț Căpușă (born 6 April 1998) is a Romanian professional footballer who plays as a right back for Liga I club Petrolul Ploiești.

== International career ==
He made his debut for Romania national team on 6 June 2021 in a friendly against England. He substituted Deian Sorescu in the 66th minute and conceded a penalty kick a minute later by fouling Jack Grealish in the penalty area. England converted the penalty and won 1–0.

== Personal life ==
Tiberiu Căpușă is the son of Giani Capușă former player FC Bacău, Politehnica Iași, Foresta Fălticeni and FC Vaslui.

== Career statistics ==
=== Club ===
As of match played 6 November 2026

Appearances and goals by club, season and competition
| Club | Season | League | | | Cupa României | | Europe | | Other | | Total | |
| Club | Season | Division | Apps | Goals | Apps | Goals | Apps | Goals | Apps | Goals | Apps | Goals |
|---|---|---|---|---|---|---|---|---|---|---|---|---|
| Viitorul Constanța | 2017–18 | Liga I | 5 | 0 | 2 | 0 | — | | — | | 7 | 0 |
| Viitorul Constanța | 2019–20 | Liga I | 4 | 0 | — | | — | | — | | 4 | 0 |
| Viitorul Constanța | Total | | 9 | 0 | 2 | 0 | 0 | 0 | 0 | 0 | 11 | 0 |
| Universitatea Cluj (loan) | 2018–19 | Liga II | 15 | 0 | 1 | 0 | — | | — | | 16 | 0 |
| Chindia Târgoviște (loan) | 2020–21 | Liga I | 33 | 1 | 3 | 0 | — | | — | | 36 | 1 |
| Chindia Târgoviște | 2021–22 | Liga I | 33 | 0 | 3 | 0 | — | | 2 (Note: Appearances in Liga I promotion/relegation play-offs) | 0 | 38 | 0 |
| Chindia Târgoviște | 2022–23 | Liga I | 34 | 1 | 1 | 0 | — | | — | | 35 | 1 |
| Chindia Târgoviște | Total | | 100 | 2 | 7 | 0 | 0 | 0 | 2 | 0 | 109 | 2 |
| UTA Arad | 2023–24 | Liga I | 29 | 2 | 0 | 0 | — | | — | | 29 | 2 |
| Hermannstadt | 2024–25 | Liga I | 28 | 0 | 8 | 1 | — | | — | | 36 | 1 |
| Hermannstadt | 2025–26 | Liga I | 35 | 1 | 4 | 0 | — | | 1 | 0 | 40 | 1 |
| Hermannstadt | Total | | 63 | 1 | 12 | 1 | — | | 1 | 0 | 76 | 2 |
| Petrolul Ploiești | 2026–27 | Liga I | 15 | 0 | 3 | 0 | — | | — | | 18 | 0 |
| Career Total | | | 231 | 5 | 25 | 1 | 0 | 0 | 3 | 0 | 259 | 6 |

=== International ===
As of 6 June 2021.

Appearances and goals by national team and year
| National team | Year | Apps | Goals |
|---|---|---|---|
Romania
| Romania | 2021 | 1 | 0 |
| Total | | 1 | 0 |

== Honours ==
Viitorul Constanța

- Supercupa României: 2019

Hermannstadt

- Cupa României runner-up: 2024–25
