= Filipe Coelho (football manager, born 1980) =

Portuguese football manager (born 1980)

Personal information
- Full name: Filipe Amaral Rino Coelho
- Date of birth: 20 October 1980 (age 46)
- Place of birth: Oeiras, Portugal

Team information
- Current team: Universitatea Craiova (head coach)

Managerial career
- Years: Team
- 2011: C.R. Caála (assistant)
- 2013: Fontinhas
- 2013–2015: Vilafranquense
- 2015–2016: Casa Pia
- 2016: Leixões
- 2016–2017: Vilafranquense
- 2017–2018: Chongqing Lifan (assistant)
- 2018–2022: South Korea (assistant)
- 2023–2025: United Arab Emirates (assistant)
- 2025–: Universitatea Craiova

Filipe Amaral Rino Coelho is a Portuguese professional football manager who is the head coach of Liga I club Universitatea Craiova.

== Managerial statistics ==
As of 22 November 2026

| Team | From | To | Record | | | | | | | |
| Team | From | To | G | W | D | L | GF | GA | GD | Win % |
|---|---|---|---|---|---|---|---|---|---|---|
| (Portugal) Fontinhas | 22 January 2013 | 30 June 2013 | 16 | 11 | 3 | 2 | 24 | 9 | +15 | 68.75 |
| (Portugal) Vilafranquense | 1 July 2013 | 21 September 2015 | 56 | 35 | 13 | 8 | 122 | 51 | +71 | 62.50 |
| (Portugal) Casa Pia | 22 September 2015 | 30 June 2016 | 33 | 18 | 9 | 6 | 53 | 24 | +29 | 54.55 |
| (Portugal) Leixões | 1 July 2016 | 2 November 2016 | 16 | 1 | 9 | 6 | 12 | 15 | −3 | 6.25 |
| (Portugal) Vilafranquense | 15 November 2016 | 4 December 2017 | 40 | 18 | 11 | 11 | 62 | 42 | +20 | 45.00 |
| (Romania) Universitatea Craiova | 11 November 2025 | present | 62 | 35 | 18 | 9 | 113 | 49 | +64 | 56.45 |
| Total | | | 223 | 118 | 63 | 42 | 386 | 190 | +196 | 52.91 |

== Honours ==
=== Coach ===
Vilafranquense

- AF Lisboa 1ª Divisão: 2015–16
- AF Lisboa Divisão de Honra: 2013–14
- AF Lisboa Supertaça: 2016

Universitatea Craiova

- Liga I: 2025–26
- Cupa României: 2025–26
- Supercupa României: 2026

Individual

- Liga I Manager of the Season: 2025–26
