= Dobra, Dâmbovița =

Dobra
- Commune
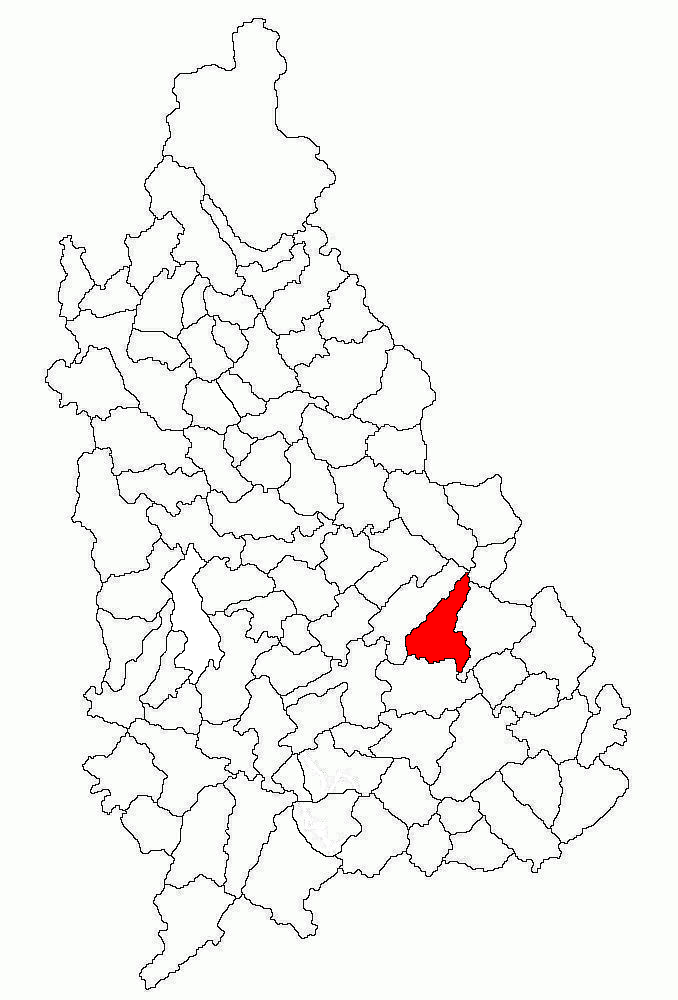
- Location in Dâmbovița County

- Location in Romania
- Coordinates: 44°47′N 25°42′E
- Country: Romania
- County: Dâmbovița

Government
  - Mayor (2024–2028): Daniel-Cosmin Nica (PSD)
- Area: 49.78 km^{2} (19.22 sq mi)
- Elevation: 178 m (584 ft)
- Population (2021-12-01): 3,388
  - Density: 68/km^{2} (180/sq mi)
- Time zone: EET/EEST (UTC+2/+3)
- Postal code: 137190
- Area code: +(40) 245
- Vehicle reg.: DB
- Website: comunadobra.ro

Dobra is a commune in Dâmbovița County, Muntenia, Romania with a population of 3,388 people as of 2021. It is composed of two villages, Dobra and Mărcești.

Historical population
Year	Pop.	±%
2002	3,853	—
2011	3,657	−5.1%
2021	3,388	−7.4%
Source: Census data

== Natives ==
- Cornel Dinu (b. 1989), footballer
