= Andrei Dragoș Șerban =

Romanian footballer

Andrei Șerban
Personal information
- Full name: Andrei Dragoș Șerban
- Date of birth: 31 October 2000 (age 26)
- Place of birth: Târgoviște, Romania
- Height: 1.76 m (5 ft 9 in)
- Position: Midfielder

Team information
- Current team: 1599 Șelimbăr
- Number: 14

Youth career
- 2011–2013: Steaua București
- 2015–2016: Chindia Târgoviște

Senior career*
Years	Team	Apps	(Gls)
2014–2015	Național Sebiș	15	(3)
2016–2023	Chindia Târgoviște	115	(11)
2024	Argeș Pitești	9	(0)
2024–2025	Unirea Ungheni	22	(2)
2025	ASA Târgu Mureș	0	(0)
2025–	1599 Șelimbăr	33	(7)
- * Club domestic league appearances and goals as of 17 October 2026

Andrei Dragoș Șerban (born 31 October 2000) is a Romanian professional footballer who plays as a midfielder for Liga II club 1599 Șelimbăr.

== Career statistics ==
Appearances and goals by club, season and competition
Club	Season	League			Cupa României		Other		Total	
Club	Season	Division	Apps	Goals	Apps	Goals	Apps	Goals	Apps	Goals
National Sebiș	2014–15	Liga III	15	3	0	0	—		15	3
Chindia Targoviste	2016–17	Liga II	2	0	0	0	—		2	0
Chindia Targoviste	2017–18	Liga II	3	0	2	0	—		5	0
Chindia Targoviste	2018–19	Liga II	29	5	0	0	—		29	5
Chindia Targoviste	2019–20	Liga I	11	0	0	0	2 (Note: Appearances in Liga I promotion/relegation play-offs)	0	13	0
Chindia Targoviste	2020–21	Liga I	5	0	1	0	1 (Note: Appearance in Liga I European play-offs)	0	7	0
Chindia Targoviste	2021–22	Liga I	23	2	2	0	2	0	27	2
Chindia Targoviste	2022–23	Liga I	30	2	3	0	—		33	2
Chindia Targoviste	2023–24	Liga II	12	2	3	1	—		15	3
Chindia Targoviste	Total		115	11	11	1	5	0	131	12
Argeș Pitești	2023–24	Liga II	9	0	—		—		9	0
Unirea Ungheni	2024–25	Liga II	22	2	5	0	—		27	2
ASA Târgu Mureș	2025–26	Liga II	0	0	0	0	—		0	0
1599 Șelimbăr	2025–26	Liga II	25	6	—		2 (Note: Appearances in Liga II relegation play-offs)	0	27	6
1599 Șelimbăr	2026–27	Liga II	8	1	1	0	—		9	1
1599 Șelimbăr	Total		33	7	1	0	2	0	36	7
Career total			194	23	17	1	7	0	218	24

== Honours ==
Chindia Târgoviște

- Liga II: 2018–19
