= Richard Sila =

French footballer (born 1998)

Personal information
- Full name: Richard Steven Sila
- Date of birth: 4 January 1998 (age 28)
- Place of birth: Massy, France
- Height: 1.85 m (6 ft 1 in)
- Position: Winger

Team information
- Current team: Andrézieux
- Number: 14

Youth career
- 2011–2014: CS Brétigny
- 2011–2016: Auxerre

Senior career*
Years	Team	Apps	(Gls)
2016	Auxerre B	2	(0)
2016–2018	Metz B	28	(5)
2018–2020	Paris FC B	21	(5)
2019–2020	Paris FC	5	(0)
2020	→ Andrézieux (loan)	3	(2)
2020–2021	→ Concarneau	20	(0)
2021	Botoșani	14	(0)
2022	Chindia Târgoviște	16	(1)
2022–	Andrézieux	19	(2)
- * Club domestic league appearances and goals as of 8 May 2022

Richard Steven Sila (born 4 January 1998) is a French professional footballer who plays as a winger for Andrézieux-Bouthéon.

== Career ==
Sila made his first team debut for Paris FC in a 2–1 Coupe de la Ligue win over Sochaux on 13 August 2019. On 22 October 2019, he signed his first professional contract with Paris FC.

In January 2020, Sila joined Andrézieux on loan until the end of the 2019–20 season. In October 2020 he joined Concarneau on loan until the end of the 2020–21 season.

== Personal life ==
Born in France, Sila is Congolese by descent.
