= Cristian Neguț =

Romanian footballer (born 1995)

Personal information
- Full name: Cristian Daniel Neguț
- Date of birth: 9 December 1995 (age 30)
- Place of birth: Ploiești, Romania
- Height: 1.76 m (5 ft 9 in)
- Position: Midfielder

Team information
- Current team: Chindia Târgoviște
- Number: 10

Youth career
- 2009–2012: Grup Școlar Agricol Nucet
- 2012–2013: Urban Titu

Senior career*
Years	Team	Apps	(Gls)
2014–2015	Urban Titu	36	(10)
2016–2023	Chindia Târgoviște	233	(47)
2022	→ CFR Cluj (loan)	8	(1)
2023–2026	Hermannstadt	103	(15)
2026–	Chindia Târgoviște	12	(3)
- * Club domestic league appearances and goals as of 31 October 2026

Cristian Daniel Neguț (born 9 December 1995) is a Romanian professional footballer who plays as a midfielder for Liga II club Chindia Târgoviște.

== Early life ==
Neguț grew up supporting his hometown club Petrolul Ploiești, like his father. They are both nicknamed "Tabarcea", after the Petrolul Ploiești player who won two Divizia A titles and collapsed on the field in 1964, at age 26.

== Career ==
=== Early career / Chindia Târgoviște ===
Neguț started his senior career with Liga III club Urban Titu. In 2016, he joined Chindia Târgoviște, with which he promoted to the Liga I at the end of the 2018–19 season after scoring twelve times from 34 appearances.

On 15 July 2019, Neguț made his top flight debut in a 2–2 draw at Gaz Metan Mediaș, and on 16 August netted for the first time in the competition in a 3–2 home defeat of Dinamo București.

==== Loan to CFR Cluj ====
On 18 January 2022, Neguț agreed to a loan until the end of the campaign at reigning champions CFR Cluj. He recorded his debut five days later, in a 3–3 league draw at FCSB, and scored his first goal in a 2–1 victory over Gaz Metan Mediaș on 12 February.

=== Hermannstadt ===
Following Chindia Târgoviște's relegation to the Liga II, Neguț moved to Hermannstadt on a two-year deal on 25 May 2023. He netted his first goal on 6 November, in a 1–0 Liga I victory over his former team CFR Cluj.

== Career statistics ==
As of match played 31 October 2026

Appearances and goals by club, season and competition
Club	Season	League			Cupa României		Other		Total	
Club	Season	Division	Apps	Goals	Apps	Goals	Apps	Goals	Apps	Goals
Urban Titu	2014–15	Liga III	25	6	0	0	—		25	6
Urban Titu	2015–16	Liga III	11	4	0	0	—		11	4
Urban Titu	Total		36	10	0	0	0	0	36	10
Chindia Târgoviște	2015–16	Liga II	13	1	0	0	—		13	1
Chindia Târgoviște	2016–17	Liga II	34	12	1	0	—		35	12
Chindia Târgoviște	2017–18	Liga II	32	6	2	0	2 (Note: Appearances in Liga I promotion/relegation play-offs)	0	36	6
Chindia Târgoviște	2018–19	Liga II	34	12	1	0	—		35	12
Chindia Târgoviște	2019–20	Liga I	35	5	1	0	2	0	38	5
Chindia Târgoviște	2020–21	Liga I	34	2	2	0	—		36	2
Chindia Târgoviște	2021–22	Liga I	16	3	2	0	—		18	3
Chindia Târgoviște	2022–23	Liga I	35	6	1	0	—		36	6
Chindia Târgoviște	Total		233	47	10	0	4	0	247	47
CFR Cluj (loan)	2021–22	Liga I	8	1	—		—		8	1
Hermannstadt	2023–24	Liga I	34	4	4	1	—		38	5
Hermannstadt	2024–25	Liga I	32	5	7	2	—		39	7
Hermannstadt	2025–26	Liga I	37	6	2	0	2	1	41	7
Hermannstadt	Total		103	15	13	3	2	1	118	19
Chindia Târgoviște	2026–27	Liga II	12	3	1	0	—		13	3
Career total			392	76	24	3	6	1	422	80

== Honours ==
Chindia Târgoviște

- Liga II: 2018–19

CFR Cluj

- Liga I: 2021–22

Hermannstadt

- Cupa României runner-up: 2024–25
