= Doru Popadiuc =

Romanian footballer

Personal information
- Date of birth: 18 February 1995 (age 31)
- Place of birth: Suceava, Romania
- Height: 1.77 m (5 ft 10 in)
- Position: Winger

Team information
- Current team: Chindia Târgoviște
- Number: 59

Youth career
- 2004–2009: Cetatea Suceava
- 2009–2011: Gheorghe Hagi Academy
- 2011–2013: Ceahlăul Piatra Neamț

Senior career*
Years	Team	Apps	(Gls)
2013–2015	Ceahlăul Piatra Neamț	60	(1)
2016	Steaua București	2	(1)
2016–2019	Voluntari	58	(5)
2018	→ Irtysh Pavlodar (loan)	26	(5)
2019–2021	Politehnica Iași	49	(4)
2021–2023	Chindia Târgoviște	70	(12)
2023–2024	Universitatea Cluj	9	(0)
2024–2025	Diósgyőr	5	(0)
2025	Voluntari	11	(3)
2025–	Chindia Târgoviște	34	(2)

International career
2013–2014	Romania U19	12	(1)
2014–2016	Romania U21	6	(0)
- * Club domestic league appearances and goals as of 25 October 2026

Doru Popadiuc (born 18 February 1995) is a Romanian professional footballer who plays as a winger for Liga II club Chindia Târgoviște.

== Club career ==
Popadiuc made his Liga I debut playing for Ceahlăul Piatra Neamț on 20 July 2013 in a match against Steaua București.

== Career statistics ==
As of match played 28 October 2026

Appearances and goals by club, season and competition
Club	Season	League			National cup (Note: Includes Cupa României, Kazakhstan Cup, Magyar Kupa)		League cup (Note: Includes Cupa Ligii)		Europe		Other		Total	
Club	Season	Division	Apps	Goals	Apps	Goals	Apps	Goals	Apps	Goals	Apps	Goals	Apps	Goals
Ceahlăul Piatra Neamț	2013–14	Liga I	22	0	1	0	—		—		—		23	0
Ceahlăul Piatra Neamț	2014–15	Liga I	25	1	2	3	1	0	—		—		28	4
Ceahlăul Piatra Neamț	2015–16	Liga II	13	0	0	0	—		—		—		13	0
Ceahlăul Piatra Neamț	Total		60	1	3	3	1	0	—		—		64	4
Steaua București	2015–16	Liga I	2	1	0	0	2	0	—		—		4	1
Voluntari	2016–17	Liga I	31	3	5	1	0	0	—		—		36	4
Voluntari	2017–18	Liga I	14	1	1	0	—		—		0	0	15	1
Voluntari	2018–19	Liga I	7	1	0	0	—		—		—		7	1
Voluntari	2019–20	Liga I	6	0	0	0	—		—		—		6	0
Voluntari	Total		58	5	6	1	0	0	—		0	0	64	6
Irtysh Pavlodar (loan)	2018	Kazakhstan Premier League	26	5	3	0	—		2 (Note: Appearances in UEFA Europa League)	0	1	0	32	5
Politehnica Iași	2019–20	Liga I	18	0	4	1	—		—		—		22	1
Politehnica Iași	2020–21	Liga I	31	4	1	0	—		—		—		32	4
Politehnica Iași	Total		49	4	5	1	—		—		—		54	5
Chindia Târgoviște	2021–22	Liga I	36	4	3	0	—		—		2 (Note: Appearances in Liga I promotion/relegation play-offs)	0	40	4
Chindia Târgoviște	2022–23	Liga I	34	8	1	0	—		—		—		35	8
Chindia Târgoviște	Total		70	12	4	0	—		—		2	0	76	12
Universitatea Cluj	2023–24	Liga I	9	0	2	0	—		—		—		11	0
Diósgyőr	2023–24	Nemzeti Bajnokság I	5	0	1	0	—		—		—		6	0
Diósgyőr	2024–25	Nemzeti Bajnokság I	0	0	0	0	—		—		—		0	0
Diósgyőr	Total		5	0	1	0	—		—		—		6	0
Voluntari	2024–25	Liga II	11	3	—		—		—		2	0	13	3
Chindia Târgoviște	2025–26	Liga II	24	2	1	0	—		—		2 (Note: Appearances in Liga I promotion/relegation play-offs)	1	27	3
Chindia Târgoviște	2026–27	Liga II	10	0	4	0	—		—		—		14	0
Chindia Târgoviște	Total		34	2	5	0	—		—		2	1	41	3
Career total			324	33	29	5	3	0	2	0	7	1	365	39

== Honours ==
Steaua București

- Cupa Ligii: 2015–16

Voluntari

- Cupa României: 2016–17
- Supercupa României: 2017

Individual

- Gazeta Sporturilor Romania Player of the Month: October 2022
