= Braloștița =

- Commune
- Location in Dolj County

- Location in Romania
- Coordinates: 44°30′N 23°31′E
- Country: Romania
- County: Dolj

Government
  - Mayor (2024–2028): Dumitru Amza (PNL)
- Area: 40.57 km^{2} (15.66 sq mi)
- Highest elevation: 300 m (980 ft)
- Lowest elevation: 75 m (246 ft)
- Population (2021-12-01): 3,602
  - Density: 88.78/km^{2} (230.0/sq mi)
- Time zone: UTC+02:00 (EET)
  - Summer (DST): UTC+03:00 (EEST)
- Postal code: 207085
- Area code: +(40) 251
- Vehicle reg.: DJ
- Website: www.primaria-bralostita.ro

Braloștița is a commune in Dolj County, Oltenia, Romania with a population of 4,200 people. It is composed of six villages: Braloștița, Ciocanele, Racovița, Schitu, Sfârcea, and Valea Fântânilor.

The commune is located in the northern part of the county, on the banks of the river Jiu, 15 km (9.3 mi) from the town of Filiași and 34 km (21 mi) from the county seat, Craiova.

== Natives ==
- Daniel Celea (born 1995), footballer
