= Alberto Călin =

Romanian footballer

Personal information
- Full name: Alberto Gheorghe Călin
- Date of birth: 8 July 2005 (age 21)
- Place of birth: Moreni, Romania
- Height: 1.70 m (5 ft 7 in)
- Position: Attacking midfielder

Youth career
- 2012–2018: Flacăra Moreni
- 2018–2023: Universitatea Craiova

Senior career*
Years	Team	Apps	(Gls)
2022–2024	Universitatea Craiova	1	(0)
2023	→ Chindia Târgoviște (loan)	6	(1)
2024	→ CSM Alexandria (loan)	10	(1)
2024–2026	Voluntari	7	(0)

International career^{‡}
2021	Romania U16	2	(0)
2022	Romania U17	4	(1)
2022–2023	Romania U18	12	(1)
- * Club domestic league appearances and goals as of 18 October 2025 ‡ National team caps and goals as of 18 June 2023

Alberto Gheorghe Călin (born 8 July 2005) is a Romanian professional footballer who plays as an attacking midfielder.

== Club career ==
=== Universitatea Craiova ===
While a junior at Flacăra Moreni in 2017, Călin traveled to Spain club Barcelona for a trial. He made his Liga I debut for Universitatea Craiova against Dinamo București on 10 February 2022.

== Career statistics ==
As of match played 18 October 2025

Appearances and goals by club, season and competition
Club	Season	League			Cupa României		Europe		Other		Total	
Club	Season	Division	Apps	Goals	Apps	Goals	Apps	Goals	Apps	Goals	Apps	Goals
Universitatea Craiova	2021–22	Liga I	1	0	0	0	—		—		1	0
Chindia Târgoviște (loan)	2023–24	Liga II	6	1	2	1	—		—		8	2
CSM Alexandria (loan)	2023–24	Liga II	10	1	—		—		—		10	1
Voluntari	2024–25	Liga II	5	0	0	0	—		1 (Note: Appearance in Liga I promotion/relegation play-offs)	0	6	0
Voluntari	2025–26	Liga II	2	0	2	0	—		—		4	0
Voluntari	Total		7	0	2	0	—		1	0	10	0
Career total			24	2	4	1	0	0	1	0	29	3
