= Dinu Moldovan =

Romanian footballer

Personal information
- Full name: Dinu Bogdan Moldovan
- Date of birth: 3 May 1990 (age 36)
- Place of birth: Alba Iulia, Romania
- Height: 1.82 m (6 ft 0 in)
- Position: Goalkeeper

Team information
- Current team: SCM Zalău

Youth career
- Apulum Alba Iulia
- –2007: Ardealul Cluj
- 2007–2009: Espanyol

Senior career*
Years	Team	Apps	(Gls)
2009–2012	Espanyol B	13	(0)
2012–2013	Astra Giurgiu	0	(0)
2013	Universitatea Cluj	1	(0)
2013–2018	Ponferradina	85	(0)
2018–2019	Voluntari	0	(0)
2019	ACS Poli Timișoara	16	(0)
2019–2023	Chindia Târgoviște	32	(0)
2023–2025	Sepsi OSK	7	(0)
2025	Rapid București	0	(0)
2025–	SCM Zalău	0	(0)

International career
2011–2012	Romania U21	4	(0)
- * Club domestic league appearances and goals as of 19 August 2024

Dinu Bogdan Moldovan (born 3 May 1990) is a Romanian professional footballer who plays as a goalkeeper for Liga III club SCM Zalău.

== Honours ==
Sepsi OSK

- Supercupa României: 2023
