= Cosmin Atanase =

Romanian footballer

Personal information
- Full name: Cosmin Gabriel Atanase
- Date of birth: 3 January 2001 (age 25)
- Place of birth: Târgoviște, Romania
- Height: 1.75 m (5 ft 9 in)
- Position: Midfielder

Team information
- Current team: CSM Alexandria (on loan from Afumați)

Youth career
- CSȘ Târgoviște
- –2020: Chindia Târgoviște

Senior career*
Years	Team	Apps	(Gls)
2018–2023	Chindia Târgoviște	21	(1)
2023–2024	Unirea Slobozia	17	(1)
2024–2025	Chindia Târgoviște	21	(2)
2025–	Afumați	17	(0)
2026–	→ CSM Alexandria (loan)	0	(0)
- * Club domestic league appearances and goals as of 9 May 2026

Cosmin Gabriel Atanase (born 3 January 2001) is a Romanian professional footballer who plays as a midfielder for Liga III club CSM Alexandria, on loan from Liga II club Afumați.

== Honours ==
Chindia Târgoviște

- Liga II: 2018–19

Unirea Slobozia

- Liga II: 2023–24
