= Alexandru Jipa =

Romanian professional footballer

Personal information
- Full name: Alexandru Daniel Jipa
- Date of birth: 14 September 2002 (age 24)
- Place of birth: Târgoviște, Romania
- Height: 1.78 m (5 ft 10 in)
- Position: Winger

Team information
- Current team: Concordia Chiajna
- Number: 7

Youth career
- –2021: Chindia Târgoviște

Senior career*
Years	Team	Apps	(Gls)
2021–2023	Chindia Târgoviște	13	(0)
2023–2025	Hermannstadt	34	(2)
2024–2025	→ Gloria Buzău (loan)	26	(3)
2025	Politehnica Iași	6	(0)
2026–	Concordia Chiajna	14	(1)
- * Club domestic league appearances and goals as of 22 August 2026

Alexandru Daniel Jipa (born 14 September 2002) is a Romanian professional footballer who plays as a winger for Liga II club Concordia Chiajna..
