= Adrian Ioniță =

Romanian footballer

Personal information
- Full name: Adrian Mihai Ioniță
- Date of birth: 11 March 2000 (age 26)
- Place of birth: Buzău, Romania
- Height: 1.78 m (5 ft 10 in)
- Position: Defender

Team information
- Current team: SCM Zalău

Youth career
- LPS Buzău
- –2016: Chindia Târgoviște

Senior career*
Years	Team	Apps	(Gls)
2016–2026	Chindia Târgoviște	94	(2)
2026	CS Dinamo București	5	(0)
2026–	SCM Zalău	0	(0)
- * Club domestic league appearances and goals as of 9 May 2026

Adrian Mihai Ioniță (born 11 March 2000) is a Romanian professional footballer who plays as a defender for Liga III club SCM Zalău.

== Honours ==
Chindia Târgoviște

- Liga II: 2018–19
