= Cornel Dinu (footballer, born 1989) =

Romanian professional footballer

Personal information
- Date of birth: 9 June 1989 (age 37)
- Place of birth: Dobra, Romania
- Height: 1.74 m (5 ft 9 in)
- Position: Defender

Team information
- Current team: Chindia Târgoviște (team manager)

Youth career
- –2008: FCM Târgoviște

Senior career*
Years	Team	Apps	(Gls)
2008–2011	FCM Târgoviște		
2011–2026	Chindia Târgoviște	220	(0)
Total		220	(0)

Managerial career
- 2026–: Chindia Târgoviște (team manager)
- * Club domestic league appearances and goals

Cornel Dinu (born 9 June 1989) is a Romanian former professional footballer who played as a defender, currently team manager at Liga II club Chindia Târgoviște.

== Career ==
Born in Dobra, 25 km away from Târgoviște, Dinu played all its career for local teams, FCM Târgoviște and Chindia Târgoviște.

== Honours ==
Chindia Târgoviște

- Liga II: 2018–19
- Liga III: 2014–15
