= Ilie Oană Stadium =

Romanian stadium

Ilie Oană
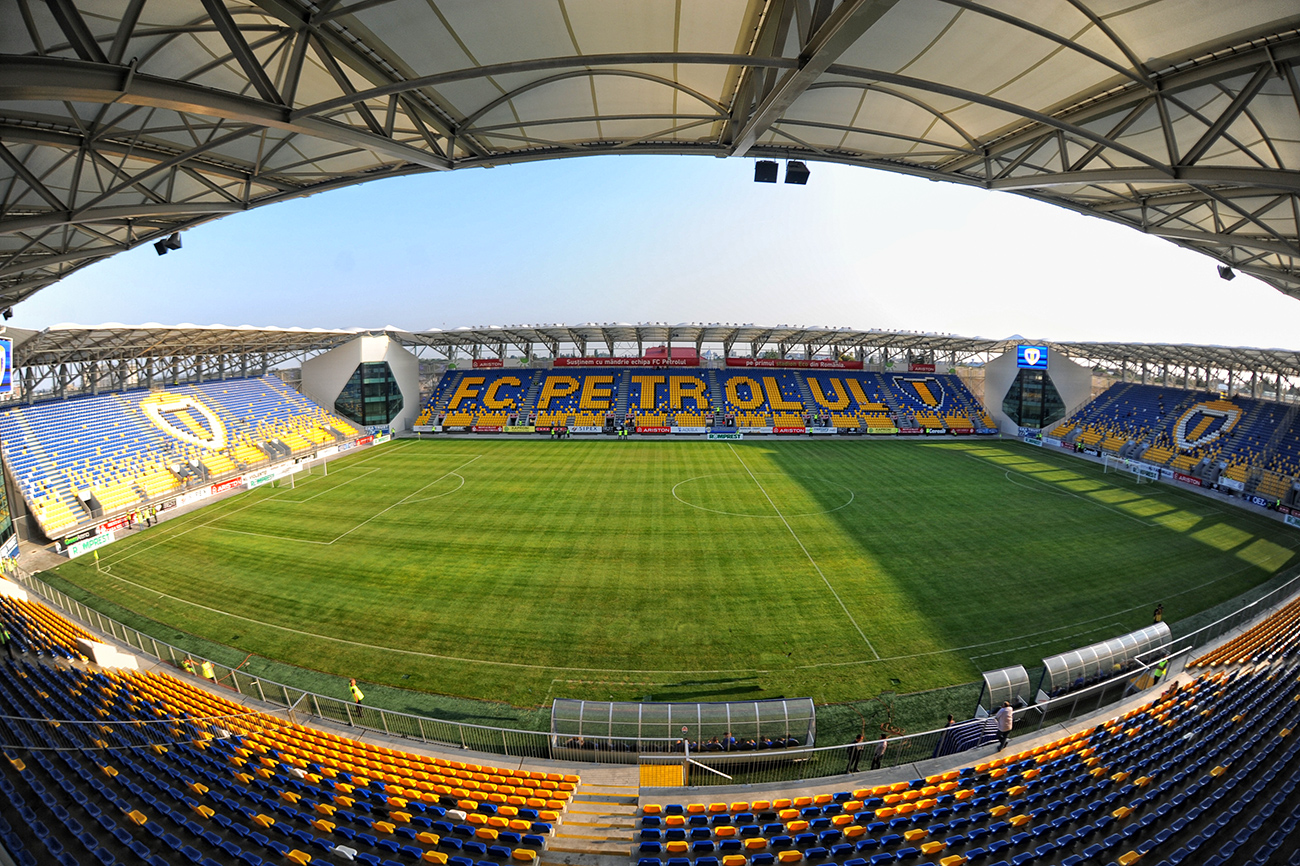
- UEFA
- Interactive map of Ilie Oană
- Full name: Stadionul Ilie Oană
- Address: 26 Stadionului Street
- Location: Ploiești, Romania
- Coordinates: 44°56′26.1″N 26°02′04.2″E
- Owner: Consiliul Local Ploiești
- Operator: Petrolul Ploiești
- Capacity: 15,073
- Surface: Grass
- Field size: 105 m × 68 m (344 ft × 223 ft)

Construction
- Groundbreaking: August 2010
- Opened: 25 September 2011
- Cost: €17,500,000 (€22 million in 2021 euros)
- Architect: Alpine Bau
- Main contractor: All Plan Construction

Tenant
- Petrolul Ploiești (2011–present)

Website
- www.fcpetrolul.ro

The Ilie Oană Stadium (Romanian: Stadionul Ilie Oană) is a football stadium in Ploiești, Romania. It has been the home ground of Petrolul Ploiești since its inauguration in September 2011, and has a capacity of 15,073 spectators. The stadium was built on the site of the former arena, which was completed in 1937 and demolished in 2010.

Being ranked as a UEFA Category 4 stadium, Ilie Oană can host Europa League semi-finals and Champions League group stage matches. The stadium is named after Ilie Oană, a legendary player and coach of Petrolul Ploiești.

== Notable events ==
The first match to be played at the stadium was an exhibition game in September 2011, between a team of former Petrolul Ploiești footballers which won the Cupa României in 1995 and a selection of former Romanian internationals, among which Gheorghe Hagi, Gheorghe Popescu, Viorel Moldovan, Ovidiu Stângă and Daniel Prodan. The former internationals won the match 4–3 and the first goal scored on this stadium belonged to Cristian Zmoleanu.

On 25 September 2011, Petrolul Ploiești played its first competitive match at the stadium, a Liga I fixture against Dinamo București. Cosmin Moți scored the first goal of the game and thus the first official goal at new Ilie Oană Stadium. Petrolul played its first European game on the stadium on 13 July 2013, a 3–0 defeat of Víkingur counting for the UEFA Europa League qualifiers.

The Romania national team played its first official match at the Ilie Oană on 29 March 2015, a 1–0 win over the Faroe Islands in the UEFA Euro 2016 qualifiers. Due to its proximity to the capital Bucharest, the stadium has continued to host Romania senior matches in recent years.

== Transport connections ==
=== Tramway ===
800 metres from Ilie Oană there is a Ploiești tramway station named "Muzeul de Istorie" (line 101). It links the stadium with the north of the city and Ploiești-South Railstation.

=== Bus ===
The TCE bus lines with a stop close to Ilie Oană are:

- 5 - Vlahuță
- 5 - Tăbăcărie
- 28, 104, 106, 302, 305 - Maternitate

=== Airport ===
The stadium is 45.6 kilometres (28.3 miles) away from the Henri Coandă International Airport in Otopeni, a town located north of Bucharest.

== Events ==
=== Association football ===
International football matches
Date	Competition	Home	Away	Score	Attendance
13 August 2014	Friendly	Romania U21	Italy U21	2–1	c. 1,000
29 March 2015	UEFA Euro 2016 qualifying	Romania	Faroe Islands	1–0	13,898
5 October 2017	2018 FIFA World Cup qualification	Romania	Kazakhstan	3–1	10,123
5 June 2018	Friendly	Romania	Finland	2–0	13,312
7 September 2018	2018–19 UEFA Nations League	Romania	Montenegro	0–0	0 (closed doors)
16 October 2018	2019 UEFA European Under-21 Championship qualification	Romania U21	Liechtenstein U21	4–0	12,108
17 November 2018	2018–19 UEFA Nations League	Romania	Lithuania	3–0	50 (only away)
8 September 2019	UEFA Euro 2020 qualifying	Romania	Malta	1–0	13,376
14 October 2020	2020–21 UEFA Nations League	Romania	Austria	0–1	0
18 November 2025	2026 FIFA World Cup qualification	Romania	San Marino	7–1	8.426

=== Association football ===
International football clubs matches
Date	Competition	Home	Away	Score	Attendance
12 November 2011	Friendly	(Romania) Petrolul Ploiești	(Serbia) Partizan	1–0	
15 July 2012	Friendly	(Romania) Petrolul Ploiești	(Greece) AEK Athens	4–0	c. 9,000
7 September 2012	Friendly	(Romania) Petrolul Ploiești	(Ukraine) Shakhtar Donetsk	0–3	7,420
18 July 2013	UEFA Europa League	(Romania) Petrolul Ploiești	(Faroe Islands) Víkingur	3–0	9,854
1 August 2013	UEFA Europa League	(Romania) Petrolul Ploiești	(Netherlands) Vitesse	1–1	11,827
29 August 2013	UEFA Europa League	(Romania) Petrolul Ploiești	(England) Swansea City	2–1	12,880
17 July 2014	UEFA Europa League	(Romania) Petrolul Ploiești	(Albania) Flamurtari Vlorë	2–0	8,714
31 July 2014	UEFA Europa League	(Romania) Petrolul Ploiești	(Czech Republic) Viktoria Plzeň	1–1	11,244
21 August 2014	UEFA Europa League	(Romania) Petrolul Ploiești	(Croatia) Dinamo Zagreb	1–3	13,460

== Gallery ==
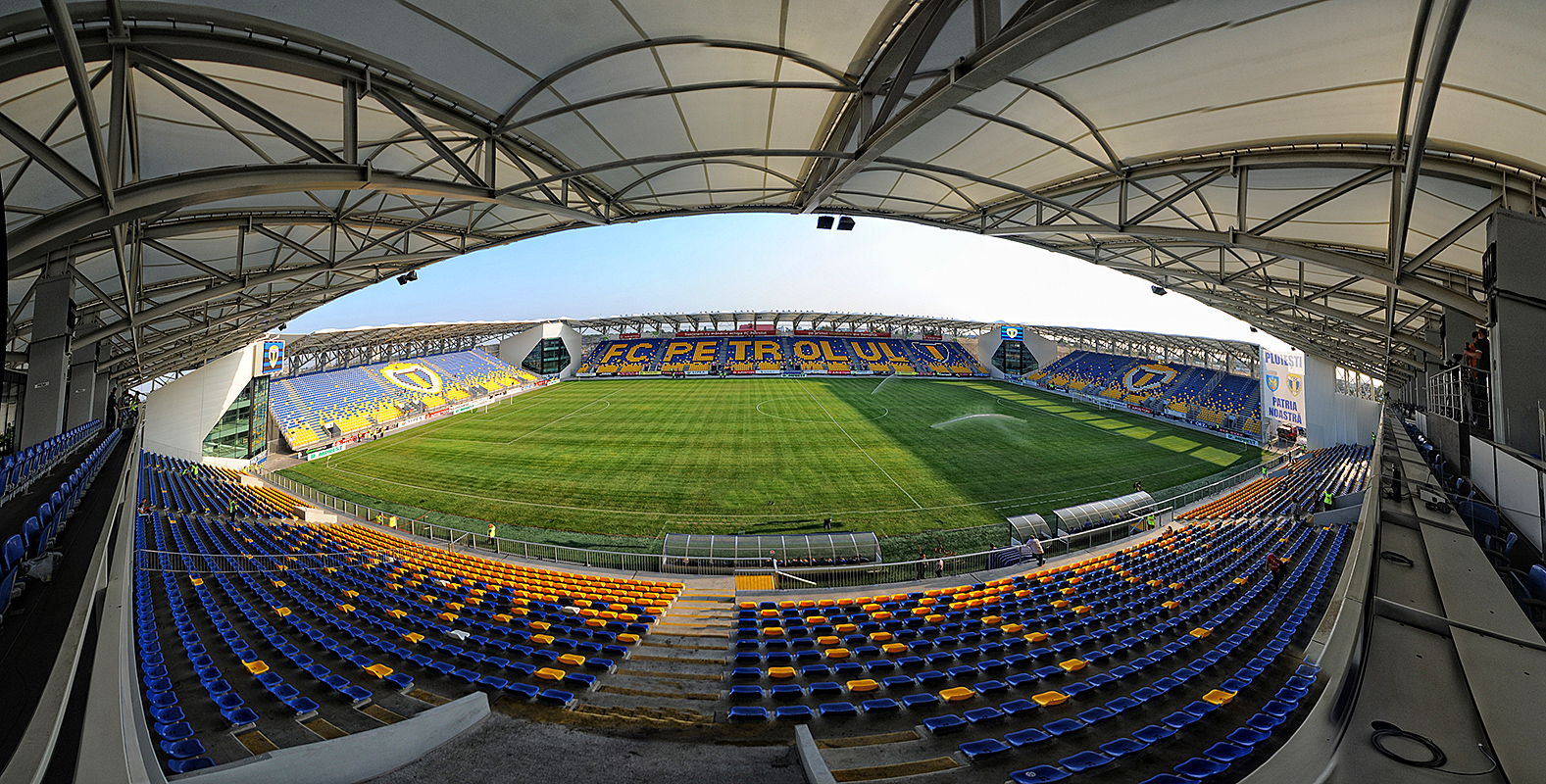
Ilie Oană Stadium view from the Main Stand

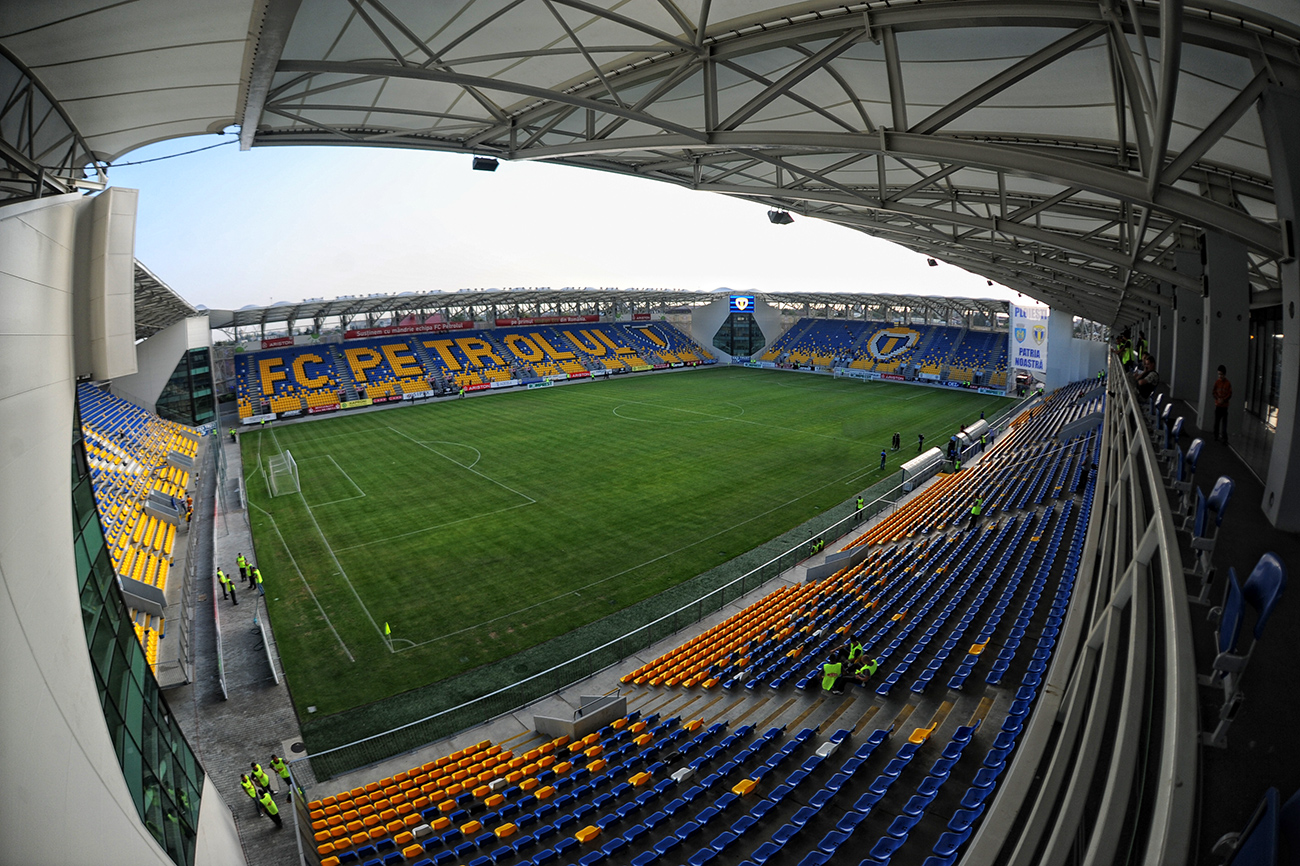
View from the upper tier of the Ilie Oană Stadium

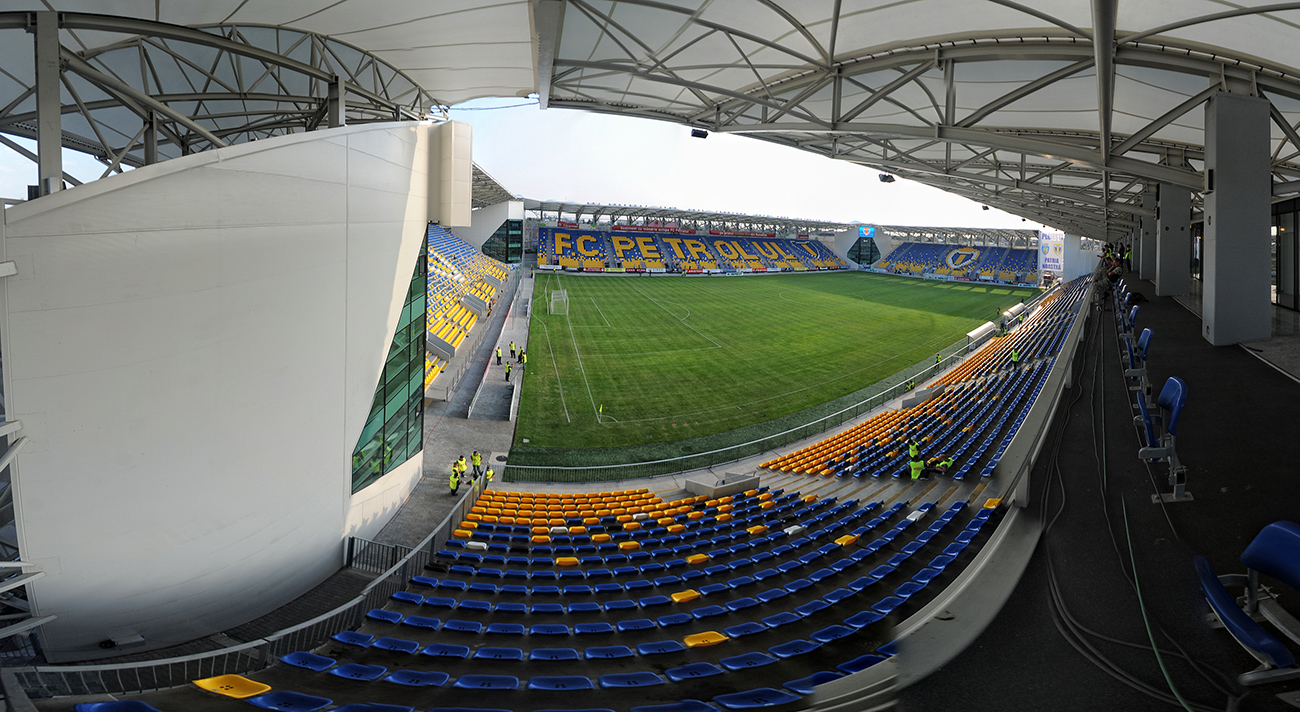
View of one of the VIP sectors

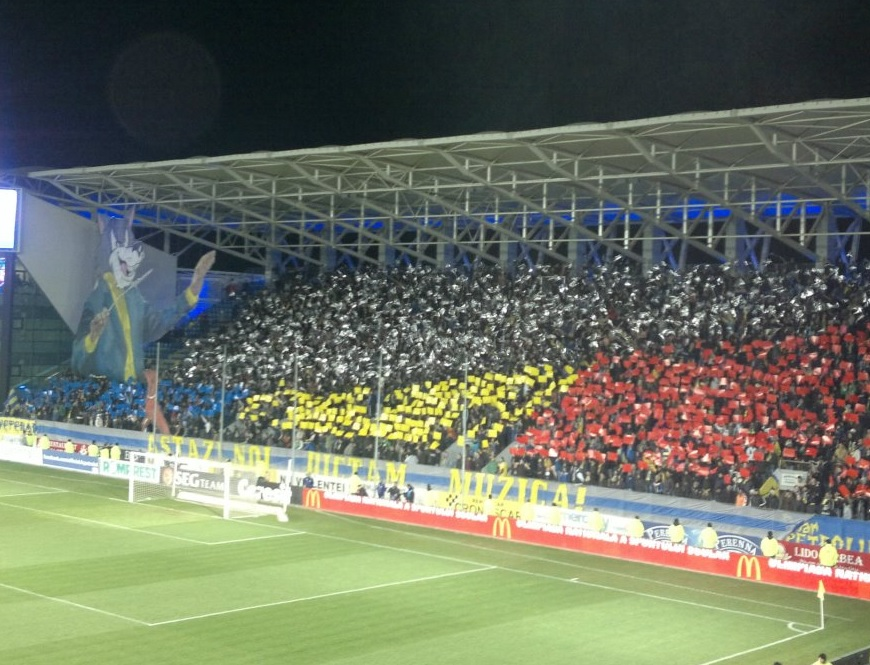
Peluza 1, the host of many Petrolul Ploiești choreographies
