= Daniel Celea =

Romanian footballer

Personal information
- Full name: Daniel Marinel Celea
- Date of birth: 6 July 1995 (age 31)
- Place of birth: Braloștița, Romania
- Height: 1.87 m (6 ft 2 in)
- Position: Defender

Team information
- Current team: Chindia Târgoviște
- Number: 6

Youth career
- –2012: Filiași
- 2015–2016: Pandurii Târgu Jiu

Senior career*
| Years | Team | Apps | (Gls) |
| 2012–2013 | Filiași | | |
| 2013 | Sporting Roșiori | | |
| 2014–2015 | Filiași | | |
| 2015–2016 | Pandurii II Târgu Jiu | | |
| 2016–2017 | UTA Arad | 1 | (0) |
| 2017–2018 | Pandurii Târgu Jiu | 20 | (0) |
| 2018–2019 | Mioveni | 48 | (1) |
| 2020 | Sepsi OSK | 8 | (0) |
| 2020–2021 | ŁKS Łódź | 1 | (0) |
| 2021–2023 | Chindia Târgoviște | 74 | (2) |
| 2023–2024 | Nea Salamis | 8 | (0) |
| 2024–2025 | Botoșani | 12 | (0) |
| 2025– | Chindia Târgoviște | 36 | (1) |
- * Club domestic league appearances and goals as of 31 October 2026

Daniel Marinel Celea (born 6 July 1995) is a Romanian professional footballer who plays as a defender for Liga II club Chindia Târgoviște.

== Career ==
On 24 August 2020, Celea signed a three-year contract with Polish I liga club ŁKS Łódź.

== Honours ==
CSO Filiași

- Liga IV – Dolj County: 2013–14

Sepsi OSK

- Cupa României runner-up: 2019–20
