= Orășenesc Stadium (Mioveni) =

Football stadium in Mioveni, Romania

- Interactive map of Orășenesc Stadium
- Former names: Dacia Stadium (2000–2010)
- Address: Str. Stadionului, nr. 2
- Location: Mioveni, Romania
- Coordinates: 44°57′37″N 24°56′26″E
- Owner: Town of Mioveni
- Operator: CS Mioveni
- Capacity: 5.948 seated
- Surface: Grass

Construction
- Opened: 2000
- Renovated: 2013–2015

Tenants
- CS Mioveni (2000–2023); Argeş Piteşti (2023–present)

The Orășenesc Stadium is a multi-purpose stadium located in Mioveni, Romania. Opened in 2000, it has a seating capacity of 5,948, out of a total capacity of 8,000 as of 2022. The stadium is generally used for football games, formerly as the home ground of local club CS Mioveni before its bankruptcy in 2024 and currently by Liga I club Argeş Piteşti.
