= 2024–25 FC Universitatea Cluj season =

FC Universitatea Cluj seasons

Universitatea Cluj
2024–25 season
- Owners: Cluj-Napoca Municipality; Babeș-Bolyai University; U Cluj Supporters Association
- Chairman: Radu Constantea
- Manager: Ioan Sabău
- Stadium: Cluj Arena
- Liga I: 4th
- Cupa României: Play-off
- Top goalscorer: League: Vladislav Blănuță (12); All: Vladislav Blănuță (12)
- Average home league attendance: 11,208
Home colours	Away colours

The 2024–25 season was the 99th season of competitive football of Universitatea Cluj, and the 3rd in Liga I, after being promoted at the end of the 2021–22 Liga II season. Universitatea Cluj will compete in the Liga I and in Cupa României.

== Players ==
=== First-team squad ===
As of 16 January 2025

Note: Flags indicate national team as defined under FIFA eligibility rules; some limited exceptions apply. Players may hold more than one non-FIFA nationality.

No.	Pos.	Nation	Player
1	GK	ROU	Ștefan Lefter
3	DF	ROU	Bogdan Mitrea (4th captain)
4	MF	ROU	Răzvan Oaidă
5	DF	ARG	Lucas Masoero
6	DF	ROU	Iulian Cristea
7	MF	ROU	Robert Silaghi
8	MF	ROU	Dorin Codrea
9	FW	TUN	Adel Bettaieb
10	MF	ROU	Dan Nistor (Vice-captain)
11	FW	ARM	Artur Miranyan
12	GK	ROU	Denis Moldovan
13	FW	CMR	Franck Tchassem
16	DF	SUI	Jasper van der Werff
17	DF	ESP	Daniel Lasure
18	MF	ROU	Andrei Artean
19	FW	CIV	Issouf Macalou

No.	Pos.	Nation	Player
20	MF	ROU	Alexandru Bota
21	MF	ROU	Mario Șfaiț
22	MF	MDA	Vadim Rață
23	MF	ROU	Ovidiu Popescu
24	DF	ROU	Radu Boboc
26	DF	ROU	Dorinel Oancea
27	MF	ROU	Alexandru Chipciu (Captain)
30	GK	LTU	Edvinas Gertmonas
66	DF	ROU	Ștefan Opriș
77	FW	ROU	Vladislav Blănuță (on loan from FC U Craiova)
93	FW	SEN	Mamadou Thiam
94	MF	ROU	Ovidiu Bic (3rd captain)
98	MF	ROU	Gabriel Simion

== Transfers ==
=== In ===
Pos.	Player	Transferred from	Fee	Date	Source
MF	(Romania) Dorin Codrea	(Romania) Concordia Chiajna	Free	6 May 2024	
MF	(Romania) Ovidiu Popescu	(Romania) FCSB	Free	29 May 2024	
MF	(Moldova) Vadim Rață	(Romania) FC Voluntari	Free	30 May 2024	
DF	(Romania) Iulian Cristea	(Romania) FC Rapid București	Free	5 June 2024	
DF	(Romania) Radu Boboc	(Romania) FC Voluntari	Free	7 June 2024	
FW	(Senegal) Mamadou Thiam	(Saudi Arabia) Al-Jabalain	Undisclosed	12 June 2024	
FW	(Tunisia) Adel Bettaieb	(Romania) Politehnica Iași	Free	22 June 2024	
FW	(Romania) Mario Șfaiț	(Romania) FC Viitorul Mihai Georgescu	Undisclosed	25 June 2024	
MF	(Cape Verde) Berto	(Portugal) Portimonense	Free	3 July 2024	
DF	(Romania) Ștefan Andrei	(Romania) Sănătatea Cluj	Free	12 July 2024	
FW	(Romania) Vladislav Blănuță	(Romania) FC U Craiova 1948	Loan	12 July 2024	
FW	(Cameroon) Franck Tchassem	(Romania) CSM Focșani	Free	12 July 2024	
DF	(Spain) Daniel Lasure	(Spain) SD Amorebieta	Free	30 July 2024	
DF	(Switzerland) Jasper van der Werff	(Germany) SC Paderborn	Free	6 August 2024	
MF	(Romania) Răzvan Oaidă	(Romania) FC Rapid București	Free	18 September 2024	
FW	(Armenia) Artur Miranyan	(Armenia) FC Noah	Free	20 September 2024	
GK	(Romania) Ștefan Lefter	(Romania) Corvinul Hunedoara	€100,000	31 December 2024	
MF	(Romania) Andrei Artean	(Romania) CFR Cluj	Free	15 January 2025	
MF	(Slovakia) Andrej Fábry	(Romania) UTA Arad	Undisclosed	10 February 2025	

=== Out ===
Pos.	Player	Transferred to	Fee	Date	Ref.
FW	(Romania) Dragoș Tescan	(Romania) Gloria Buzău	Free	31 May 2024	
GK	(Bulgaria) Plamen Iliev	(Bulgaria) Cherno More Varna	Free	31 May 2024	
DF	(Romania) Andrei Pițian	(Romania) FC Voluntari	Free	31 May 2024	
MF	(Ivory Coast) Kevin Doukouré	(Romania) FC Argeș	Free	31 May 2024	
FW	(Romania) Daniel Popa	(Romania) FCSB	€300,000	4 June 2024	
GK	(Romania) Iustin Chirilă	(Romania) FC Voluntari	Loan	14 June 2024	
FW	(Romania) Albert Hofman	(Romania) Oțelul Galați	Loan	17 June 2024	
MF	(Italy) Marco Fossati		Free	18 June 2024	
DF	(Romania) Andrei Peteleu	(Romania) FC Voluntari	Free	1 July 2024	
FW	(Romania) Valentin Gheorghe	(Romania) Politehnica Iași	Free	1 July 2024	
FW	(Argentina) Federico Anselmo		Free	1 July 2024	
MF	(Romania) Ștefan Pănoiu	(Romania) FC Rapid București	Loan return	1 July 2024	
MF	(Croatia) Ante Roguljić	(Romania) Universitatea Craiova	Loan return	1 July 2024	
DF	(Romania) Alin Chinteș	(Romania) Unirea Ungheni	Loan	1 July 2024	
DF	(Brazil) Thalisson	(Turkey) Antalyaspor	€280,000	17 July 2024	
MF	(Brazil) Roger		Free	22 August 2024	
MF	(Romania) Matei Moraru	(Romania) FC U Craiova 1948	Loan	8 September 2024	
MF	(Cape Verde) Berto		Released	4 November 2024	
GK	(Romania) Andrei Gorcea	(Romania) UTA Arad	Free	5 January 2025	

== Pre-season and friendlies ==
Win Draw Loss Fixtures

28 June 2024 Friendly	SV Ried (Austria)	1–1	(Romania) Universitatea Cluj	Ampflwang im Hausruckwald, Austria
19:00 CEST (UTC+2)	Pomer 45'		Bettaieb 48'

1 July 2024 Friendly	Universitatea Cluj (Romania)	5–0	(Austria) UVB Vöcklamarkt	Ampflwang im Hausruckwald, Austria
19:00 CEST (UTC+2)	Bettaieb 15', 39'; Bic 23'; Silaghi 43'; Suciu 65'

4 July 2024 Friendly	Universitatea Cluj (Romania)	0–2	(Hungary) Diósgyőri VTK	Ampflwang im Hausruckwald, Austria
14:00 CEST (UTC+2)

5 July 2023 Friendly	Universitatea Cluj (Romania)	0–2	(Czech Republic) Slovan Liberec	Ampflwang im Hausruckwald, Austria
15:00 CEST (UTC+2)

16 July 2024 Friendly	Universitatea Cluj (Romania)	3–0	(Romania) CSM Olimpia Satu Mare	Cluj-Napoca
18:00 CEST (UTC+2)	Thiam 42', 89'; Suciu 70'

8 January 2025 Friendly	Universitatea Cluj (Romania)	4–1	(South Korea) Gangwon FC	Serik
15:00 EET (UTC+2)		Report		Stadium: Sueno Sports Center - Pitch 1

11 January 2025 Friendly	Universitatea Cluj (Romania)	1–2	(Hungary) MTK Budapest	Serik
15:00 EET (UTC+2)

12 January 2025 Friendly	Zürich (Switzerland)	2–0	(Romania) Universitatea Cluj	Serik
14:00 EET (UTC+2)				Stadium: Sueno Sports Center - Pitch 1

== Competitions ==
=== Overall record ===
Competition	First match	Last match	Starting round	Final position	Record							
Competition	First match	Last match	Starting round	Final position	Pld	W	D	L	GF	GA	GD	Win %
Liga I	13 July 2024	24 May 2025	Matchday 1	4th	30	14	10	6	43	27	+16	46.67
Cupa României	29 August 2024	29 August 2024	Play-off	Play-off	1	0	0	1	0	1	−1	0.00
Total					31	14	10	7	43	28	+15	45.16

Last updated: 30 May 2025
Source: Competitions

=== Liga I ===
==== Regular season ====
===== League table =====
Pos	Team	Pld	W	D	L	GF	GA	GD	Pts	Advances
2	CFR Cluj	30	14	12	4	56	32	+24	54	Qualification for play-off round
3	Universitatea Craiova	30	14	10	6	45	28	+17	52 (Note: Ranked on head-to-head points: Universitatea Craiova (4); Universitatea Cluj (1).)	Qualification for play-off round
4	Universitatea Cluj	30	14	10	6	43	27	+16	52	Qualification for play-off round
5	Dinamo București	30	13	12	5	41	26	+15	51	Qualification for play-off round
6	Rapid București	30	11	13	6	35	26	+9	46	Qualification for play-off round

Source: LPF (in Romanian)
Rules for classification: 1) Points; 2) Head-to-head points; 3) Head-to-head goal difference; 4) Head-to-head goals scored; 5) Goal difference; 6) Goals scored; 7) Play-off.

==== Results summary ====
Overall								Home						Away					
Pld	W	D	L	GF	GA	GD	Pts	W	D	L	GF	GA	GD	W	D	L	GF	GA	GD
30	14	10	6	43	27	+16	52	9	3	3	28	16	+12	5	7	3	15	11	+4

===== Results by round =====
Round	1	2	3	4	5	6	7	8	9	10	11	12	13	14	15	16	17	18	19	20	21	22	23	24	25	26	27	28	29	30
Ground	A	H	A	A	A	H	A	H	A	H	A	A	H	A	H	H	A	H	H	H	A	H	A	H	A	H	H	A	H	A
Result	D	W	D	W	D	W	W	W	W	D	L	D	W	W	D	L	L	L	W	W	D	W	D	W	L	D	W	W	L	D
Position	7	3	4	3	3	2	1	1	1	1	1	1	1	1	1	1	1	3	1	1	1	1	1	1	1	4	3	2	4	4

Updated to match(es) played on 20 December 2024. Source: worldfootball
A = Away; H = Home; W = Win; D = Draw; L = Loss

==== Matches ====
The league fixtures were unveiled on 1 July 2024.

13 July 2024 1	FCSB	1–1	Universitatea Cluj	Bucharest
22:00 EEST (UTC+3)	Musi 51'		Nistor 57' (pen.)	Stadium: Steaua Stadium; Referee: Adrian Cojocaru

21 July 2024 2	Universitatea Cluj	3–1	FC Hermannstadt	Cluj-Napoca
19:00 EEST (UTC+3)	Blănuță 7', 37'; Nistor 20' (pen.)		Bejan 41'	Stadium: Cluj Arena

29 July 2024 3	UTA	0–0	Universitatea Cluj	Arad
18:30 EEST (UTC+3)				Stadium: Francisc von Neuman

4 August 2024 4	CFR	2–3	Universitatea Cluj	Cluj-Napoca
18:30 EEST (UTC+3)	Michael 24'; Păun 72'		Masoero 59'; Nistor 69' (pen.); Popescu 77'	Stadium: Dr. Constantin Rădulescu

12 August 2024 5	Petrolul	0–0	Universitatea Cluj	Ploiești
18:30 EEST (UTC+3)				Stadium: Ilie Oană

19 August 2024 6	Universitatea Cluj	3–0	Sepsi	Cluj-Napoca
19:00 EEST (UTC+3)	Thiam 38'; Blănuță 58', 70'			Stadium: Cluj Arena

26 August 2024 7	Gloria Buzău	0–2	Universitatea Cluj	Buzău
19:00 EEST (UTC+3)			Nistor 27' (pen.); Thiam 43'	Stadium: Municipal

2 September 2024 8	Universitatea Cluj	1–0	Dinamo	Cluj-Napoca
21:30 EEST (UTC+3)	Bic 62'			Stadium: Cluj Arena

16 September 2024 9	Rapid	0–2	Universitatea Cluj	Bucharest
21:30 EEST (UTC+3)			Berto 30'; Nistor 60' (pen.)	Stadium: Rapid-Giulești

22 September 2024 10	Universitatea Cluj	1–1	Universitatea Craiova	Cluj-Napoca
21:30 EEST (UTC+3)	Thiam 38'		Oshima 68'	Stadium: Cluj Arena

28 September 2024 11	Politehnica Iași	1–0	Universitatea Cluj	Iași
16:45 EEST (UTC+3)	Gheorghe (yellow card) 25'; Guilherme Soares 50'; Roman (yellow card) 74'; Ispas (yellow card) 90+3'	Report	Silaghi (yellow card) 56'; Rață (yellow card) 68'; Daniel Lasure (yellow card) 79'; Nistor (yellow card) 90+1'	Stadium: Emil Alexandrescu Stadium; Attendance: 5,205; Referee: (Romania) Sorin Andrei Antonie

5 October 2024 12	Unirea Slobozia	2–2	Universitatea Cluj	Clinceni
16:45 EET (UTC+2)	Jordan Gele 16' (yellow card) 25'; Constantin Adrian Toma 22'	Report	Masoero (yellow card) 20'; Miranyan 52'; Boboc 63'; Chipciu (yellow card) 80'; Blănuță (yellow card) 89'	Stadium: Clinceni Stadium; Referee: (Romania) Robert Avram

18 October 2024 13	Universitatea Cluj	2–0	Oțelul	Cluj-Napoca
21:00 EET (UTC+2)	Daniel Lasure (yellow card) 16'; Bic (yellow card) 56'; Nistor 61' (pen.); Thiam 69'	Report	Angha (yellow card) 85'	Stadium: Cluj Arena; Attendance: 9,140; Referee: (Romania) Andrei Chivulete

28 October 2024 14	Botoșani	1–2	Universitatea Cluj	Botoșani
18:00 EET (UTC+2)	Bodișteanu 4'; Adams Friday (red card) 79'; Francisco Júnior (yellow card) 90+5'	Report	Cristea 45'; Berto (yellow card) 63'; Boboc (yellow card) 67'; Miranyan 88'	Stadium: Botoșani Municipal Stadium; Referee: (Romania) Szabolcs Kovacs

3 November 2024 15	Universitatea Cluj	1–1	FCV Farul Constanța	Cluj-Napoca
16:00 EET (UTC+2)	Blănuță 4'; Masoero (yellow card) 90+5'	Report	Alibec 27' (yellow card) 77'; Banu (yellow card) 78'; Popescu (yellow card) 88'	Stadium: Cluj Arena; Referee: (Romania) István Kovács

10 November 2024 16	Universitatea Cluj	1–2	FCSB	Cluj-Napoca
21:00 EET (UTC+2)	Simion (yellow card) 23'; Cristea (yellow card) 76'; Blănuță 85'; Chipciu (yellow card) 89'; Nistor (yellow card) 90'	Report	Bîrligea 30' 51' (yellow card) 75'; Crețu (yellow card) 44'; Șut (yellow card) 59' (yellow-red card) 73'	Stadium: Cluj Arena; Attendance: 23,123; Referee: (Romania) Marcel Bîrsan

23 November 2024 17	Hermannstadt	2–1	Universitatea Cluj	Sibiu
17:00 EET (UTC+2)	Ianis Stoica 3' (pen.) 62'; Tiago Gonçalves (yellow card) 22'; Balaure (yellow card) 54'; Căpușă (yellow card) 75'	Report	Cristea (yellow card) 25'; Boboc (yellow card) 45+2'; Daniel Lasure (yellow card) 69'; Miranyan 90+2'	Stadium: Sibiu Municipal Stadium; Referee: (Romania) Ionuţ Coza

2 December 2024 18	Universitatea Cluj	0–1	UTA Arad	Cluj-Napoca
17:30 EET (UTC+2)	Oancea (yellow card) 63'; Chipciu (yellow card) 81'; Rață (yellow card) 86'	Report	Attah Kadiri 28'; Tsouka (yellow card) 52'; Fábry (yellow card) 63'; Poulolo (yellow card) 72'; Mabea (yellow card) 79'; Mihai (yellow card) 81'; Aleksandar Mitrović (yellow card) 90+6'	Stadium: Cluj Arena; Referee: (Romania) Marian Barbu

9 December 2024 19	Universitatea Cluj	3–2	CFR Cluj	Cluj-Napoca
20:30 EET (UTC+2)	Thiam (yellow card) 29'; Bic (yellow card) 45'; Masoero 51' 58'; Blănuță 69'; Popescu (yellow card) 71'; Miranyan (yellow card) 81'; Gertmonas (yellow card) 90+2'	Report	Fică (yellow card) 31'; Munteanu 45+2'; Đoković (yellow card) 45+2'; Kamara (yellow card) 71'; Postolachi 83'; Mogoș (yellow card) 90+2'	Stadium: Cluj Arena; Attendance: 14,813; Referee: (Romania) Florin Andrei

14 December 2024 20	Universitatea Cluj	4–1	Petrolul Ploiești	Cluj-Napoca
20:00 EET (UTC+2)	Blănuță 51' 65'; Thiam 61'; Silaghi (yellow card) 76'; Masoero 87'	Report	Papp (yellow card) 20' (yellow-red card) 90+3' (goal) 75'; Marian Huja (yellow card) 38'; Rădulescu (yellow card) 80'; Zima (yellow card) 90+3'	Stadium: Cluj Arena; Referee: (Romania) István Kovács

20 December 2024 21	Sepsi	0–0	Universitatea Cluj	Sfântu Gheorghe
19:00 EET (UTC+2)	Ștefan (red card) 6'; Mino (yellow card) 43'; Sigér (yellow card) 70'; Gyenge (yellow card) 90+6'	Report		Stadium: Sepsi Arena Stadium; Referee: (Romania) George Găman

18 January 2025 22	Universitatea Cluj	2–1	Gloria Buzău	Cluj-Napoca
14:30 EET (UTC+2)				Stadium: Cluj Arena

24 January 2025 23	Dinamo București	0–0	Universitatea Cluj	Bucharest
				Stadium: Arcul de Triumf Stadium

31 January 2025 24	Universitatea Cluj	2–1	Rapid București	Cluj-Napoca
				Stadium: Cluj Arena

5 February 2025 25	Universitatea Craiova	1–0	Universitatea Cluj	Craiova
				Stadium: Ion Oblemenco

9 February 2025 26	Universitatea Cluj	2–2	Politehnica Iași	Cluj-Napoca
				Stadium: Cluj Arena

17 February 2025 27	Universitatea Cluj	3–2	Unirea Slobozia	Cluj-Napoca
				Stadium: Cluj Arena

21 February 2025 28	Oțelul	0–1	Universitatea Cluj	Galați
20:00 EET (UTC+2)				Stadium: Oțelul

1 March 2025 29	Universitatea Cluj	0–1	Botoșani	Cluj-Napoca
16:00 EET (UTC+2)				Stadium: Cluj Arena

7 March 2025 30	FCV Farul Constanța	1–1	Universitatea Cluj	Ovidiu
18:00 EET (UTC+2)				Stadium: Central Stadium

==== Play-off round ====
===== Play-off table =====
Pos	Team	Pld	W	D	L	GF	GA	GD	Pts	Qualification
1	FCSB (C)	10	7	3	0	18	9	+9	52	Qualification for Champions League first qualifying round
2	CFR Cluj	10	4	4	2	17	11	+6	43	Qualification for Europa League first qualifying round (Note: The winner of the 2024–25 Cupa României (CFR Cluj) qualifies for the Europa League first qualifying round.)
3	Universitatea Craiova	10	4	2	4	13	11	+2	40	Qualification for Conference League second qualifying round
4	Universitatea Cluj	10	4	1	5	12	15	−3	39	Qualification for Conference League second qualifying round
5	Rapid București	10	2	4	4	12	17	−5	33	
6	Dinamo București	10	1	2	7	10	19	−9	31	

Source: Soccerway, FRF (in Romanian), LPF (in Romanian)
Rules for classification: 1) Points; 2) Points without rounding; 3) Points in the regular season; 4) Head-to-head points; 5) Head-to-head goal difference; 6) Head-to-head goals scored; 7) Goal difference; 8) Goals scored; 9) Play-off (only if needed to decide champion or teams for UEFA competitions). (Note: only criteria 7 and 8 are applied to establish the classification during the competition.) Source:
(C) Champions

==== Matches ====
14 March 2025 1	Universitatea Craiova	3–0	Universitatea Cluj	Craiova
22:00 EEST (UTC+3)				Stadium: Ion Oblemenco

31 March 2025 2	Universitatea Cluj	1–0	CFR	Cluj-Napoca
19:00 EEST (UTC+3)				Stadium: Cluj Arena

5 April 2025 3	FCSB	1–0	Universitatea Cluj	Bucharest
18:30 EEST (UTC+3)

12 April 2025 4	Universitatea Cluj	2–4	Dinamo	Cluj-Napoca
18:30 EEST (UTC+3)				Stadium: Cluj Arena

19 April 2025 5	Rapid	0–2	Universitatea Cluj	Bucharest
18:30 EEST (UTC+3)				Stadium: Rapid-Giulești

26 April 2025 6	Universitatea Cluj	2–1	Universitatea Craiova	Cluj-Napoca
19:00 EEST (UTC+3)				Stadium: Cluj Arena

3 May 2025 7	CFR	1–0	Universitatea Cluj	Cluj-Napoca
19:00 EEST (UTC+3)

11 May 2025 8	Universitatea Cluj	0–2	FCSB	Cluj-Napoca
21:30 EEST (UTC+3)				Stadium: Cluj Arena

16 May 2025 9	Dinamo	1–3	Universitatea Cluj	Bucharest
21:30 EEST (UTC+3)

24 May 2025 10	Universitatea Cluj	2–2	Rapid	Cluj-Napoca
18:30 EEST (UTC+3)				Stadium: Cluj Arena

=== Cupa României ===
29 August 2024 Play-off round	Metalul Buzău	1-0	Universitatea Cluj	Buzău
17:00 EET	Matei Constantinescu 62' (yellow card) 90+5'; Olaru (yellow card) 82'; Tudorică (yellow card) 88'; Perju (yellow card) 90+2'	Report	Blănuță (yellow card) 87'; Simion (yellow card) 90+5'	Stadium: Metalul Stadium; Referee: (Romania) Constantin Alin Olaru
