= Bogdan Mitrea =

Romanian footballer

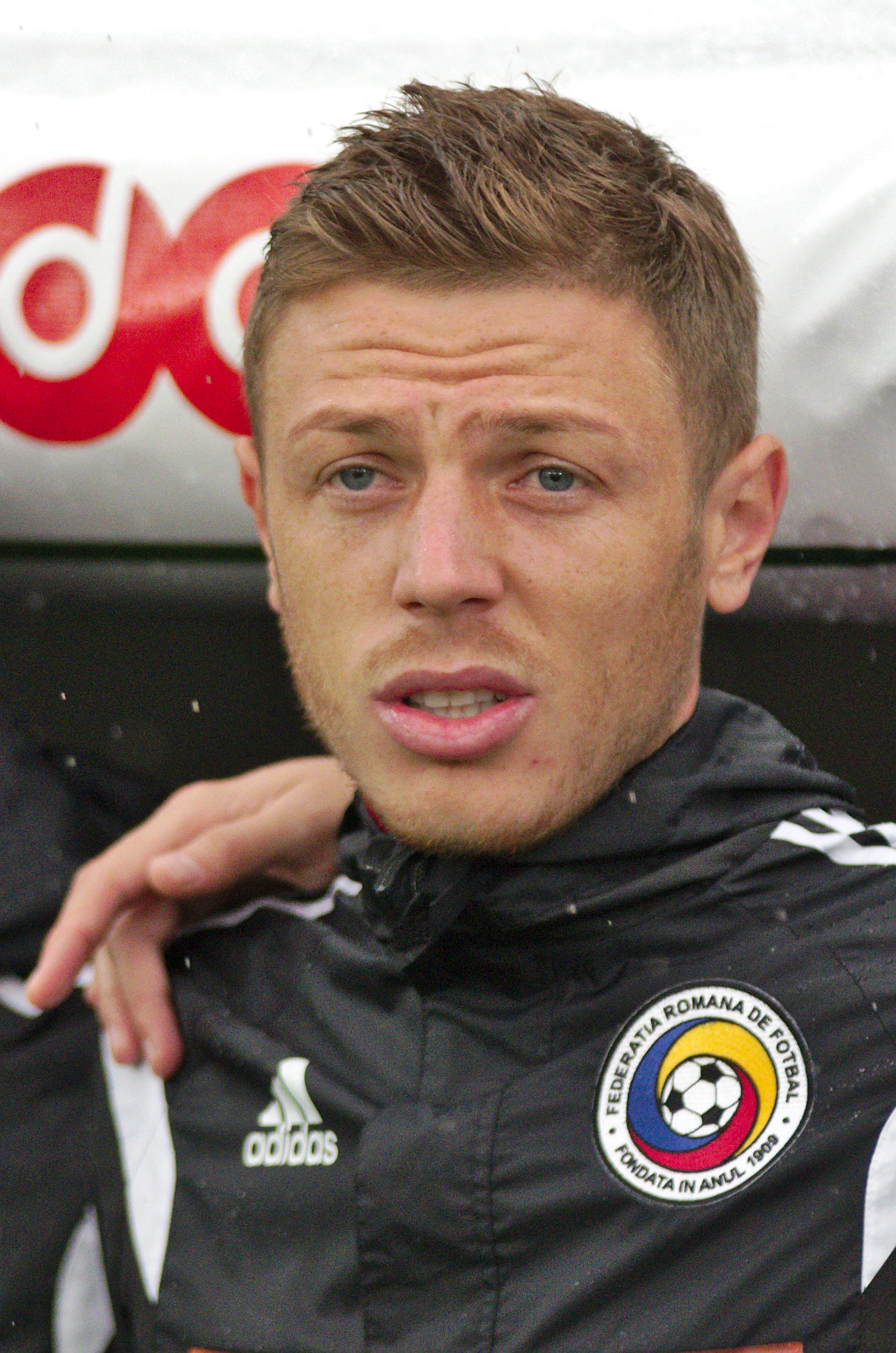
- Mitrea with Romania in 2014

Personal information
- Full name: Bogdan Alexandru Mitrea
- Date of birth: 29 September 1987 (age 39)
- Place of birth: Cluj-Napoca, Romania
- Height: 1.85 m (6 ft 1 in)
- Position: Centre-back

Youth career
- 1996–2006: Universitatea Cluj
- 1998–1999: → Viitorul Cluj (loan)

Senior career*
Years	Team	Apps	(Gls)
2006–2007	Universitatea Cluj	0	(0)
2006–2007	→ Bihorul Beiuș (loan)		
2007–2008	SESO Iara		
2008–2011	Seso Câmpia Turzii	15	(0)
2011–2013	CSMS Iași	40	(3)
2013–2015	Viitorul Constanța	81	(19)
2016–2017	Ascoli	16	(0)
2016	→ Steaua București (loan)	5	(0)
2017–2018	AEL Limassol	42	(3)
2018–2019	Doxa Katokopias	29	(2)
2019–2020	Spartak Trnava	20	(6)
2020–2022	Sepsi OSK	78	(11)
2022–2023	Universitatea Craiova	19	(2)
2023–2025	Universitatea Cluj	44	(2)
Total		389	(48)

International career
2020	Romania	1	(1)
- * Club domestic league appearances and goals

Bogdan Alexandru Mitrea (born 29 September 1987) is a Romanian former professional footballer who played as a centre-back.

== Career statistics ==
=== Club ===
Appearances and goals by club, season and competition
Club	Season	League			National cup (Note: Includes Cupa României, Slovak Cup)		League cup (Note: Includes Cupa Ligii)		Europe		Other		Total	
Club	Season	Division	Apps	Goals	Apps	Goals	Apps	Goals	Apps	Goals	Apps	Goals	Apps	Goals
Bihorul Beiuș (loan)	2006–07	Liga III	?	?	?	?	—		—		—		?	?
SESO Iara	2007–08	Liga IV	?	?	?	?	—		—		—		?	?
Seso Câmpia Turzii	2008–09	Liga II	15	0	?	?	—		—		—		15	0
Seso Câmpia Turzii	2009–10	Liga III	?	?	?	?	—		—		—		?	?
Seso Câmpia Turzii	2010–11	Liga III	?	?	?	?	—		—		—		?	?
Seso Câmpia Turzii	Total		15	0	?	?	—		—		—		15	0
CSMS Iași	2011–12	Liga II	21	2	0	0	—		—		—		21	2
CSMS Iași	2012–13	Liga I	19	1	0	0	—		—		—		19	1
CSMS Iași	Total		40	3	0	0	—		—		—		40	3
Viitorul Constanța	2013–14	Liga I	29	3	2	0	—		—		—		31	3
Viitorul Constanța	2014–15	Liga I	30	14	0	0	1	0	—		—		31	14
Viitorul Constanța	2015–16	Liga I	22	2	2	0	1	0	—		—		25	2
Viitorul Constanța	Total		81	19	4	0	2	0	—		—		87	19
Ascoli	2015–16	Serie B	16	0	0	0	—		—		—		16	0
Steaua București (loan)	2016–17	Liga I	5	0	1	0	1	0	2 (Note: One appearance in UEFA Champions League, one appearance in UEFA Europa League)	0	—		9	0
AEL Limassol	2016–17	Cypriot First Division	14	1	2	0	—		—		—		16	1
AEL Limassol	2017–18	Cypriot First Division	28	2	0	0	—		6 (Note: Appearances in UEFA Europa League)	0	—		34	2
AEL Limassol	Total		42	3	2	0	—		6	0	—		50	3
Doxa Katokopias	2018–19	Cypriot First Division	29	2	2	0	—		—		—		31	2
Spartak Trnava	2019–20	Slovak Super Liga	20	6	2	0	—		3	1	1 (Note: Appearance in Czech-Slovak Supercup)	0	26	7
Sepsi OSK	2020–21	Liga I	36	5	1	0	—		—		1 (Note: Appearance in Liga I play-offs for UEFA Europa Conference League)	0	38	5
Sepsi OSK	2021–22	Liga I	37	5	6	1	—		1 (Note: Appearance(s) in UEFA Europa Conference League)	0	—		44	6
Sepsi OSK	2022–23	Liga I	5	1	0	0	—		4	0	1 (Note: Appearance in Supercupa României)	0	10	1
Sepsi OSK	Total		78	11	7	1	—		5	0	2	0	92	12
Universitatea Craiova	2022–23	Liga I	19	2	2	0	—		—		—		21	2
Universitatea Cluj	2023–24	Liga I	27	2	3	0	—		—		1	0	31	2
Universitatea Cluj	2024–25	Liga I	17	0	1	0	—		—		—		18	0
Universitatea Cluj	Total		44	2	4	0	—		—		1	0	49	2
Career total			389	48	24	1	3	0	16	1	4	0	433	50

=== International ===
Appearances and goals by national team and year
National team	Year	Apps	Goals
Romania
Romania	2020	1	1
Total		1	1

Scores and results list Romania's goal tally first, score column indicates score after each Mitrea goal.

List of international goals scored by Bogdan Mitrea
No.	Date	Venue	Cap	Opponent	Score	Result	Competition
1	11 November 2020	Ilie Oană Stadium, Ploiești, Romania	1	Belarus	1–0	5–3	Friendly

== Honours ==
SESO Iara

- Liga IV – Cluj County: 2007–08

Studențesc Iași

- Liga II: 2011–12

Sepsi OSK

- Cupa României: 2021–22
- Supercupa României: 2022

Individual

- Liga I Team of the Season: 2020–21
