= 2022–23 CS Universitatea Craiova season =

CS Universitatea Craiova
2022–23 season
- Chairman: Marian Copilu
- Manager: László Balint
- Liga I: 4th
- Cupa României: Group stage
- UEFA Europa Conference League: Play-off round
Home colours

The 2022–23 season is CS Universitatea Craiova's ninth consecutive and 37th overall season in Liga I. In addition to the Liga I, Universitatea Craiova participated in this season's edition of the Cupa României and the UEFA Europa Conference League.

== Squad information ==
Players, appearances, goals and squad numbers last updated on 30 June 2022. Appearances and goals include league matches only.
Note: Flags indicate national team as has been defined under FIFA eligibility rules. Players may hold more than one non-FIFA nationality.

No.	Player	Nat.	Position(s)	Date of birth (age)	Signed in	Contract ends	Signed from	Transfer fee	Apps.	Goals
Goalkeepers
1	David Lazar	(Romania)	GK	8 August 1991 (age 35)	2021	2025	(Romania) Astra Giurgiu	€200K	5	0
31	Denis Rusu	(Romania)	GK	2 August 1990 (age 36)	2021	2023	(Romania) Viitorul Târgu Jiu	Undisclosed	0	0
Defenders
2	Paul Papp	(Romania)	DF	11 November 1989 (age 37)	2020	2023	(Turkey) Sivasspor	Free	40	2
5	Bogdan Vătăjelu	(Romania)	DF	24 April 1993 (age 33)	2019	2023	(Czech Republic) Sparta Prague	€350K	179	10
11	Nicușor Bancu	(Romania)	DF	18 September 1992 (age 34)	2014	2024	(Romania) Olt Slatina	€80K	248	22
18	Ștefan Vlădoiu	(Romania)	DF	28 December 1998 (age 27)	2016	2023	Academy	-	75	1
25	Valerică Găman	(Romania)	DF	25 February 1989 (age 37)	2021	Undisclosed	(Romania) Astra Giurgiu	Free	17	0
32	Denis Benga	(Romania)	DF	24 July 2005 (age 21)	2022	Undisclosed	Academy	-	0	0
Midfielders
6	Vladimir Screciu	(Romania)	MD	13 January 2000 (age 26)	2020	2025	(Belgium) Genk	Free	91	0
8	Alexandru Mateiu	(Romania)	MD	10 December 1989 (age 36)	2014	2024	(Romania) Brașov	€500K	211	9
10	Ionuț Vînă	(Romania)	MD	20 February 1995 (age 31)	2021	Undisclosed	(Romania) FCSB	Free	19	2
14	Alexandru Crețu	(Romania)	MD	24 April 1992 (age 34)	2021	Undisclosed	(Romania) FCSB	Free	28	3
16	Dan Nistor	(Romania)	MD	6 May 1988 (age 38)	2020	2022	(Romania) Dinamo București	€260K	85	10
21	Matteo Fedele	(Switzerland)	MD	20 July 1992 (age 34)	2022	Undisclosed	(Malta) Ħamrun Spartans	Free	44	2
22	Gustavo Vagenin	(Brazil)	MD	14 November 1991 (age 34)	2020	2023	(China) Liaoning	Free	98	27
24	Ante Roguljić	(Romania)	MD	11 March 1996 (age 30)	2021	Undisclosed	(Slovakia) Trenčín	Free	19	5
33	Mihai Căpățînă	(Romania)	MD	16 December 1995 (age 30)	2020	2024	(Romania) Voluntari	€250K	43	1
35	David Sala	(Romania)	MD	24 August 2004 (age 22)	2020	Undisclosed	Academy	-	1	0
36	Alberto Călin	(Romania)	MD	8 July 2005 (age 21)	2019	Undisclosed	Academy	-	1	0
Forwards
7	George Cîmpanu	(Romania)	FW	8 October 2000 (age 26)	2020	2025	(Romania) Botoșani	€500K	57	7
9	Andrei Ivan	(Romania)	FW	4 January 1997 (age 29)	2019	2023	(Russia) Krasnodar	€1.5M	183	42
17	Ștefan Baiaram	(Romania)	FW	31 December 2002 (age 23)	2019	2026	Academy	-	78	10
19	Elvir Koljić	(Bosnia and Herzegovina)	FW	8 July 1995 (age 31)	2018	2025	(Bosnia and Herzegovina) Krupa	€450K	74	30
20	Jovan Marković	(Romania)	FW	23 March 2001 (age 25)	2017	2024	Academy	-	46	13

== Transfers ==
=== In ===
Date	Pos.	Player	Age	Moving from	Fee	Notes	Source
28 June 2022	DF	(Portugal) Raul Silva	32	(Portugal) Braga	Undisclosed	Signed for two years.	
11 July 2022	DF	(Switzerland) Ivan Martić	31	(Switzerland) Sion	Undisclosed	Signed for two years.	

=== Out ===
Date	Pos.	Player	Age	Moving to	Fee	Notes	Source
13 June 2022	DF	(Romania) Marius Constantin	37	(Romania) Argeș Pitești	Undisclosed		
15 June 2022	MF	(Romania) Ovidiu Bic	28	(Romania) Universitatea Cluj	Undisclosed		
2 July 2022	DF	(Guinea) Antoine Conte	28		Undisclosed		

== Kit ==
Supplier: Puma / Sponsors: Betano (front)

The club is in the third year of a deal with Puma – the club's official kit supplier.

Home	Away

- Home: The home kit features thick blue and white vertical stripes separated by thin black stripes. White shorts and blue socks complete the look.
- Away:

== Competitions ==
=== Liga I ===
==== Regular season ====
===== Table =====
Pos	Team	Pld	W	D	L	GF	GA	GD	Pts	Qualification
2	CFR Cluj	30	20	3	7	54	28	+26	63	Qualification for the Play-off round
3	FCSB	30	17	6	7	51	35	+16	57	Qualification for the Play-off round
4	Universitatea Craiova	30	16	6	8	37	27	+10	54	Qualification for the Play-off round
5	Rapid București	30	15	7	8	40	26	+14	52	Qualification for the Play-off round
6	Sepsi OSK	30	11	9	10	47	30	+17	42	Qualification for the Play-off round

Source: LPF (in Romanian) Soccerway
Rules for classification: 1) Points; 2) Head-to-head points; 3) Head-to-head goal difference; 4) Head-to-head goals scored; 5) Goal difference; 6) Goals scored; 7) Play-off.

===== Matches =====
The draw for Liga I was held on the 1st of July.

15 July 2022 1	Universitatea Craiova	2–2	Sepsi OSK	Craiova
21:30 EEST (UTC+3)	Gustavo Vagenin 29' 59'; Baiaram (yellow card) 33'; Papp (yellow card) 63'; Pigliacelli (yellow card) 65'; Mateiu (red card) 89'	Report	Bărbuț (yellow card) 44'; Dumitrescu (yellow card) 65'; Mitrea (yellow card) 65'; Damașcan 73'; Păun 87'	Stadium: Stadionul Ion Oblemenco; Referee: Radu Petrescu

24 July 2022 2	Universitatea Cluj	1–1	Universitatea Craiova	Mediaș
18:30 EEST (UTC+3)	Filip 6'	Report	Papp 64'	Stadium: Stadionul Municipal Gaz Metan; Referee: Cătălin Popa

31 July 2022 3	Universitatea Craiova	0–1	Rapid București	Craiova
20:15 EEST (UTC+3)		Report	Ioniță 51'	Stadium: Stadionul Ion Oblemenco; Referee: Horațiu Feșnic

7 August 2022 4	FC U Craiova 1948	1–2	Universitatea Craiova	Craiova
21:30 EEST (UTC+3)	Compagno 70' (pen.)	Report	Ivan 41' (pen.); Hanca 45+4' (pen.)	Stadium: Stadionul Ion Oblemenco; Referee: István Kovács

14 August 2022 5	Universitatea Craiova	1–0	Mioveni	Drobeta-Turnu Severin
16:00 EEST (UTC+3)	Ivan 37'	Report		Stadium: Stadionul Municipal; Referee: Lucian Rusandu

29 August 2022 7	Universitatea Craiova	1–0	Botoșani	Drobeta-Turnu Severin
21:00 EEST (UTC+3)	Crețu 90+3'	Report		Stadium: Stadionul Municipal; Referee: Marcel Bîrsan

1 September 2022 8	Hermannstadt	1–0	Universitatea Craiova	Mediaș
21:00 EEST (UTC+3)	Paraschiv 50'	Report		Stadium: Stadionul Municipal Gaz Metan; Referee: Florin Andrei

5 September 2022 9	Universitatea Craiova	4–3	Farul Constanța	Craiova
21:30 EEST (UTC+3)	Marković 26', 66'; Ivan 44'; Nistor 71'	Report	Morar 2'; Torje 33', 41'	Stadium: Stadionul Ion Oblemenco; Referee: Adrian Cojocaru

11 September 2022 10	CFR Cluj	2–0	Universitatea Craiova	Cluj-Napoca
21:30 EEST (UTC+3)	Muhar 17'; Găman 27' (o.g.)	Report		Stadium: Stadionul Dr. Constantin Rădulescu; Referee: Andrei Chivulete

18 September 2022 11	Universitatea Craiova	2–1	FCSB	Craiova
21:30 EEST (UTC+3)	Mitrea 32' (pen.); Oaidă 66' (o.g.)	Report	Compagno 45+6' (pen.)	Stadium: Stadionul Ion Oblemenco; Referee: Radu Petrescu

30 September 2022 12	Universitatea Craiova	1–1	Voluntari	Craiova
21:00 EEST (UTC+3)	Ivan 72' (pen.)	Report	Damașcan 55'	Stadium: Stadionul Ion Oblemenco; Referee: István Kovács

7 October 2022 13	Argeș Pitești	1–0	Universitatea Craiova	Pitești
21:00 EEST (UTC+3)	Calcan 52'	Report		Stadium: Stadionul Nicolae Dobrin; Referee: Marian Barbu

15 October 2022 14	Universitatea Craiova	2–1	Petrolul Ploiești	Craiova
21:00 EEST (UTC+3)	Cîmpanu 76'; Rivaldinho 90+1'	Report	Irobiso 58'	Stadium: Stadionul Ion Oblemenco; Referee: Marcel Bîrsan

15 October 2022 15	UTA Arad	1–2	Universitatea Craiova	Arad
18:15 EEST (UTC+3)	Abeid 13'	Report	Baiaram 45+1', 57'	Stadium: Stadionul Francisc von Neuman; Referee: Andrei Chivulete

29 October 2022 16	Sepsi OSK	0–1	Universitatea Craiova	Sfântu Gheorghe
21:30 EEST (UTC+3)		Report	Vătăjelu 58'	Stadium: Sepsi Arena Stadium; Referee: Marian Barbu

5 November 2022 17	Universitatea Craiova	1–0	Universitatea Cluj	Craiova
21:00 EET (UTC+2)	Crețu 60'	Report		Stadium: Stadionul Ion Oblemenco; Referee: Iulian Călin

12 November 2022 18	Rapid București	2–2	Universitatea Craiova	Bucharest
20:30 EET (UTC+2)	Albu 24'; Dugandžić 72'	Report	Crețu 4'; Baiaram 19'	Stadium: Superbet Arena-Giulești; Referee: Adrian Cojocaru

29 November 2022 6	Chindia Târgoviște	1–1	Universitatea Craiova	Ploiești
19:00 EET (UTC+2)	D. Popa 90'	Report	Crețu 13'	Stadium: Stadionul Ilie Oană; Referee: Ionuţ Coza

3 December 2022 19	Universitatea Craiova	0–2	FC U Craiova 1948	Craiova
19:00 EET (UTC+2)		Report	Baeten 50'; Ganea 60'	Stadium: Stadionul Ion Oblemenco; Referee: Andrei Chivulete

12 December 2022 20	Mioveni	0–1	Universitatea Craiova	Mioveni
20:30 EET (UTC+2)		Report	Cîmpanu 41'	Stadium: Stadionul Orășenesc; Referee: Adrian Cojocaru

17 December 2022 21	Universitatea Craiova	3–0	Chindia Târgoviște	Craiova
20:30 EET (UTC+2)	Crețu 22'; Marković 29'; Mitrea 65'	Report		Stadium: Stadionul Ion Oblemenco; Referee: Florin Andrei

21 January 2023 22	Botoșani	1–0	Universitatea Craiova	Botoșani
20:00 EET (UTC+2)	Mailat 35'	Report		Stadium: Stadionul Municipal; Referee: Radu Petrescu

28 January 2023 23	Universitatea Craiova	2–0	Hermannstadt	Craiova
20:00 EET (UTC+2)	Ivan 48', 69'	Report		Stadium: Stadionul Ion Oblemenco; Referee: Marcel Bîrsan

6 February 2023 24	Farul Constanța	2–1	Universitatea Craiova	Ovidiu
20:00 EET (UTC+2)	Mazilu 6'; Larie 34' (pen.)	Report	Nistor 59'	Stadium: Central Stadium; Referee: Andrei Chivulete

11 February 2023 25	Universitatea Craiova	2–0	CFR Cluj	Craiova
20:00 EET (UTC+2)	Ivan 67', 86'	Report	Manea (yellow card) 66'	Stadium: Stadionul Ion Oblemenco; Referee: Marcel Bîrsan

19 February 2023 26	FCSB	1–1	Universitatea Craiova	Bucharest
20:00 EET (UTC+2)	Edjouma 1'	Report	Koljić 90+1'	Stadium: Arena Națională; Referee: Adrian Cojocaru

27 February 2023 27	Voluntari	1–0	Universitatea Craiova	Voluntari
17:45 EET (UTC+2)	Rață 50'	Report		Stadium: Stadionul Anghel Iordănescu; Referee: Horațiu Feșnic

1 March 2023 28	Universitatea Craiova	1–0	Argeș Pitești	Craiova
18:00 EET (UTC+2)	Ivan 74' (pen.)	Report		Stadium: Stadionul Ion Oblemenco; Referee: Rareș Vidican

5 March 2023 29	Petrolul Ploiești	0–1	Universitatea Craiova	Ploiești
15:30 EET (UTC+2)		Report	Ivan 45+3'	Stadium: Stadionul Ilie Oană; Referee: Horia Mladinovici

10 March 2023 30	Universitatea Craiova	2–1	UTA Arad	Craiova
20:30 EET (UTC+2)	Marković 52'; Koljić 65'	Report	Batha 39'; Kucher (yellow card) 49'	Stadium: Stadionul Ion Oblemenco; Referee: Cătălin Popa

==== Play-off round ====
===== Table =====
Pos	Team	Pld	W	D	L	GF	GA	GD	Pts	Qualification	FAR	FCS	CFR	CRA	RAP	SPS
1	Farul Constanța (C)	10	6	3	1	22	13	+9	53	Qualification to Champions League first qualifying round		3–2	1–0	3–2	7–2	2–1
2	FCSB	10	5	2	3	15	15	0	46	Qualification to Europa Conference League second qualifying round	2–1		1–0	1–1	1–5	3–1
3	CFR Cluj (O)	10	2	4	4	11	14	−3	42	Qualification to European competition play-offs	1–2	1–1		1–1	2–2	2–1
4	Universitatea Craiova	10	3	4	3	15	14	+1	40		1–1	1–2	1–1		3–1	0–1
5	Rapid București	10	3	3	4	17	20	−3	38		1–1	1–0	3–1	2–3		0–0
6	Sepsi OSK (Note: Cup winner)	10	2	2	6	10	14	−4	29	Qualification to Europa Conference League second qualifying round	1–1	1–2	1–2	1–2	2–0	

Source: Soccerway, FRF (in Romanian), LPF (in Romanian)
Legend: Blue = home team win; Yellow = draw; Red = away team win.
Rules for classification: 1) Points; 2) Points without rounding; 3) Head-to-head points; 4) Head-to-head goal difference; 5) Head-to-head goals scored; 6) Goal difference; 7) Goals scored; 8) Play-off (only if needed to decide champion or teams for UEFA competitions). (Note: only criteria 6 and 7 are applied to establish the classification during the competition.)
(C) Champions; (O) Play-off winners

===== Matches =====
18 March 2023 1	FCSB	1–1	Universitatea Craiova	Bucharest
20:00 EET (UTC+2)	Edjouma 66'	Report	Marković 32'	Stadium: Arena Națională; Referee: Florin Andrei

2 April 2023 2	Universitatea Craiova	1–1	CFR Cluj	Craiova
21:00 EEST (UTC+3)	Koljić 72'	Report	Cvek 69'	Stadium: Stadionul Ion Oblemenco; Referee: István Kovács

8 April 2023 3	Farul Constanța	3–2	Universitatea Craiova	Ovidiu
20:30 EEST (UTC+3)	Munteanu 17'; Grameni 54'; Larie 84' (pen.)	Report	Koljić 9'; Cîmpanu 48'	Stadium: Central Stadium; Referee: Adrian Cojocaru

16 April 2023 4	Universitatea Craiova	3–1	Rapid București	Craiova
21:00 EEST (UTC+3)	Cîmpanu 38'; Marković 82'; Roguljić 90+2'	Report	Dugandžić 31' (pen.)	Stadium: Stadionul Ion Oblemenco; Referee: Radu Petrescu

21 April 2023 5	Sepsi OSK	1–2	Universitatea Craiova	Sfântu Gheorghe
20:30 EEST (UTC+3)	Ștefănescu 90+5'	Report	Crețu 49'; Marković 66'	Stadium: Sepsi Arena Stadium; Referee: Marcel Bîrsan

30 April 2023 6	Universitatea Craiova	1–2	FCSB	Craiova
21:00 EEST (UTC+3)	Koljić 90+4' (pen.)	Report	Compagno 44'; Sorescu 84'	Stadium: Stadionul Ion Oblemenco; Referee: István Kovács

7 May 2023 7	CFR Cluj	1–1	Universitatea Craiova	Cluj-Napoca
21:00 EEST (UTC+3)	Muhar 66'	Report	Ivan 69'	Stadium: Stadionul Dr. Constantin Rădulescu; Referee: Radu Petrescu

13 May 2023 8	Universitatea Craiova	1–1	Farul Constanța	Craiova
21:30 EEST (UTC+3)	Ivan 82' (pen.)	Report	Santos 24'	Stadium: Stadionul Ion Oblemenco; Referee: Andrei Chivulete

22 May 2023 9	Rapid București	2–3	Universitatea Craiova	Bucharest
20:30 EEST (UTC+3)	Dugandžić 33' (pen.), 59' (pen.)	Report	Ivan 43' (pen.), 52'; Crețu 65'	Stadium: Superbet Arena-Giulești; Referee: Adrian Cojocaru

28 May 2023 10	Universitatea Craiova	0–1	Sepsi OSK	Craiova
21:00 EEST (UTC+3)		Report	Ștefănescu 90+4'	Stadium: Stadionul Ion Oblemenco; Referee: Marian Barbu

=== Cupa României ===
==== Group stage ====
Pos	Team	Pld	W	D	L	GF	GA	GD	Pts	Qualification	HER	ARG	MIN	UCV	OCN	CHI
1	FC Hermannstadt (1)	3	2	0	1	7	5	+2	6	Qualification for quarter-finals	—	—	—	0–2	—	4–1
2	FC Argeș Pitești (1)	3	1	2	0	3	2	+1	5	Qualification for quarter-finals	—	—	—	2–1	—	—
3	Minaur Baia Mare (2)	3	1	1	1	8	3	+5	4		2–3	0–0	—	—	—	—
4	Universitatea Craiova (1)	3	1	1	1	4	3	+1	4		—	—	—	—	—	—
5	CS Ocna Mureș (3)	3	1	1	1	2	7	−5	4		—	—	0–6	1–1	—	1–0
6	Chindia Târgoviște (1)	3	0	1	2	2	6	−4	1		—	1–1	—	—	—	—

Source: FRF
Legend: Blue = home team win; Yellow = draw; Red = away team win.

19 October 2022 1	Hermannstadt	0–2	Universitatea Craiova	Mediaș
18:15 EEST (UTC+3)		Report	Vătăjelu 12'; Găman 89' (pen.)	Stadium: Stadionul Municipal Gaz Metan; Referee: Iulian Dima

9 November 2022 2	Ocna Mureș	1–1	Universitatea Craiova	Zlatna
17:00 EET (UTC+2)	P. Cioargă 48'	Report	Ivan 29' (pen.)	Stadium: Stadionul Minaur; Referee: Iuliana Demetrescu

7 December 2022 3	Argeș Pitești	2–1	Universitatea Craiova	Pitești
17:00 EET (UTC+2)	Bertrand 64'; Tofan 69'	Report	Screciu 55'	Stadium: Stadionul Nicolae Dobrin; Referee: Szabolcs Kovacs

=== UEFA Europa Conference League ===
==== Qualifying rounds ====
===== Second qualifying round =====
21 July 2022 First leg	Vllaznia (Albania)	1–1	(Romania) Universitatea Craiova	Shkodër, Albania
21:00 CEST (UTC+2)	Gurishta (yellow card) 28'; Hoxhaj 51'; Vulaj (yellow card) 53'; Kainã (yellow card) 61'	Report	Bancu (yellow card) 33'; Vagenin (yellow card) 43'; Ivan 45+2' (pen.); Crețu (yellow card) 59'; Raúl Silva (yellow card) 87'	Stadium: Loro Boriçi Stadium; Attendance: 8,958; Referee: Paul Mclaughlin (Ireland)

28 July 2022 Second leg	Universitatea Craiova (Romania)	3–0 (4–1 agg.)	(Albania) Vllaznia	Craiova, Romania
20:30 EEST (UTC+3)	Vagenin (yellow card) 51'; Mateiu 58'; Raul Silva 62'; Găman 80'; Baiaram (yellow card) 83'	Report	Marku (yellow card) 67'	Stadium: Stadionul Ion Oblemenco; Attendance: 12,324; Referee: Ondřej Berka (Czech Republic)
Note: Universitatea Craiova won 4–1 on aggregate.

===== Third qualifying round =====
4 August 2022 First leg	Zorya Luhansk (Ukraine)	1–0	(Romania) Universitatea Craiova	Lublin, Poland
19:30 CEST (UTC+2)	Nahnoynyi (yellow card) 50', (goal) 56'; Danchenko (yellow card) 59'; Nazaryna (yellow card) 90+4'	Report	Bancu (yellow card) 6'; Hanca (yellow card) 55'	Stadium: Arena Lublin; Attendance: 782; Referee: Georgi Davidov (Bulgaria)

11 August 2022 Second leg	Universitatea Craiova (Romania)	3–0 (3–1 agg.)	(Ukraine) Zorya Luhansk	Craiova, Romania
20:30 EEST (UTC+3)	Raul Silva 5', (yellow card) 71'; Ivan (yellow card) 31'; Koljić (yellow card) 45'; Baiaram 53'; Bancu 57'; Mateiu (yellow card) 90+1'	Report	Buletsa (yellow card) 71'	Stadium: Stadionul Ion Oblemenco; Attendance: 15,079; Referee: Matej Jug (Slovenia)
Note: Universitatea Craiova won 3–1 on aggregate.

==== Play-off round ====
18 August 2022 First leg	Universitatea Craiova (Romania)	1–1	(Israel) Hapoel Be'er Sheva	Drobeta-Turnu Severin, Romania
20:30 EEST (UTC+3)	Papp (red card) 46'; Rădoi (not on pitch) (yellow card) 74'; Ivan 75'; Crețu (yellow card) 89'	Report	Hélder Lopes (yellow card) 38'; Bareiro (yellow card) 45'; Elhamed (yellow card) 52' (yellow-red card) 74'; Keltjens (yellow card) 61'; Hatuel 70'	Stadium: Stadionul Municipal; Attendance: 10,127; Referee: Nick Walsh (Scotland)

25 August 2022 Second leg	Hapoel Be'er Sheva (Israel)	1–1 (a.e.t.) (2–2 agg.) (4–3 p)	(Romania) Universitatea Craiova	Be'er Sheva, Israel
aa:00 EEST (UTC+3)	Bareiro (yellow card) 15'; Elias (yellow card) 16'; Abu Abaid (yellow card) 90+2'; Hélder Lopes (yellow card) 104'; Hemed 105+1'; Barda (not on pitch) (yellow card); Ansah (yellow card); Keltjens (yellow card); André Martins (yellow card)	Report	Crețu (yellow card) 55'; Roguljić 105'	Stadium: Turner Stadium; Attendance: 14,701; Referee: Erik Lambrechts (Belgium)
	Penalties
	Suleymanov (penalty scored); Keltjens (penalty scored); Lopes (penalty scored); Dadia (penalty scored)		(penalty scored) Roguljić; (penalty missed) Ivan; (penalty scored) Nistor; (penalty scored) Găman; (penalty missed) Bancu
Note: 2–2 on aggregate. Hapoel Be'er Sheva won 4–3 on penalties.
