= Alexandru Cîmpanu =

Romanian footballer (born 2000)

Personal information
- Full name: George Alexandru Cîmpanu
- Date of birth: 8 October 2000 (age 26)
- Place of birth: Chiajna, Romania
- Height: 1.78 m (5 ft 10 in)
- Positions: Winger; forward

Team information
- Current team: Chongqing Tonglianglong (on loan from Botoșani)
- Number: 9

Youth career
- 2006–2017: Concordia Chiajna
- 2017: FC Memmingen
- 2018: Concordia Chiajna

Senior career*
Years	Team	Apps	(Gls)
2018–2019	CSM Alexandria	20	(11)
2019–2020	Botoșani	20	(3)
2020–2024	Universitatea Craiova	99	(11)
2023–2024	→ Universitatea Cluj (loan)	9	(1)
2024	→ UTA Arad (loan)	13	(2)
2025–	Botoșani	33	(4)
2026–	→ Chongqing Tonglianglong (loan)	28	(7)

International career^{‡}
2020–2023	Romania U21	8	(1)
2021	Romania Olympic	2	(0)
- * Club domestic league appearances and goals as of 8 November 2026 ‡ National team caps and goals as of 28 June 2023

George Alexandru Cîmpanu (born 8 October 2000) is a Romanian professional footballer who plays as a winger or a forward for Chinese Super League club Chongqing Tonglianglong, on loan from Liga I club Botoșani.

== Club career ==
Cîmpanu played youth football for Concordia Chiajna and German team FC Memmingen, before moving to Alexandria in 2018 to register his senior debut in the Romanian third division.

The following year, Cîmpanu joined Liga I club Botoșani, for which he amassed three goals from 22 appearances in all competitions. On 5 October 2020, shortly before his 20th birthday, he transferred to fellow league side Universitatea Craiova in a move worth €500,000.

== Career statistics ==
As of match played 8 November 2026

Appearances and goals by club, season and competition
Club	Season	League			National cup (Note: Includes Cupa României, Chinese FA Cup)		Continental		Other		Total	
Club	Season	Division	Apps	Goals	Apps	Goals	Apps	Goals	Apps	Goals	Apps	Goals
CSM Alexandria	2018–19	Liga III	20	11	0	0	—		—		20	11
Botoșani	2019–20	Liga I	17	2	2	0	—		—		19	2
Botoșani	2020–21	Liga I	3	1	0	0	0	0	—		3	1
Botoșani	Total		20	3	2	0	0	0	—		22	3
Universitatea Craiova	2020–21	Liga I	21	1	6	1	—		—		27	2
Universitatea Craiova	2021–22	Liga I	35	6	4	0	2 (Note: Appearances in UEFA Europa Conference League)	0	2 (Note: One appearance in Supercupa României, one appearance in Liga I European play-offs)	0	43	6
Universitatea Craiova	2022–23	Liga I	31	4	2	0	2	0	—		35	4
Universitatea Craiova	2023–24	Liga I	12	0	1	0	—		—		13	0
Universitatea Craiova	Total		99	11	13	1	4	0	2	0	118	12
Universitatea Cluj (loan)	2023–24	Liga I	9	1	1	0	—		—		10	1
UTA Arad (loan)	2024–25	Liga I	13	2	1	0	—		—		14	2
Botoșani	2024–25	Liga I	17	0	—		—		—		17	0
Botoșani	2025–26	Liga I	16	4	3	1	—		—		19	5
Botoșani	Total		33	4	3	1	—		—		36	5
Chongqing Tonglianglong (loan)	2026	Chinese Super League	28	7	3	0	—		—		31	7
Career total			222	39	23	2	4	0	2	0	251	41

== Honours ==
Universitatea Craiova

- Cupa României: 2020–21
- Supercupa României: 2021
