= Vladislav Blănuță =

Association footballer (born 2002)

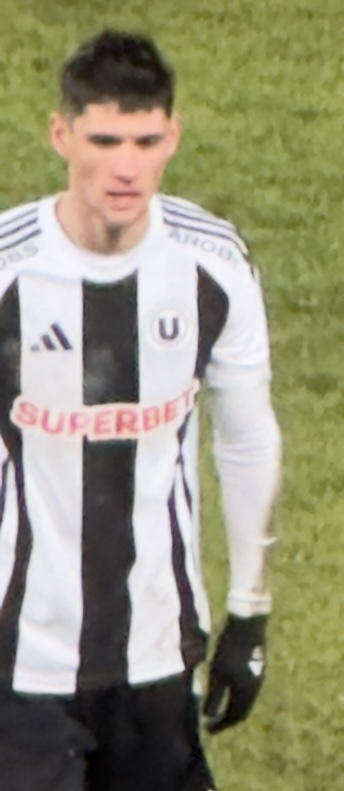
- Blănuță with Universitatea Cluj in 2024

Personal information
- Date of birth: 12 January 2002 (age 24)
- Place of birth: Hîncești, Moldova
- Height: 1.92 m (6 ft 4 in)
- Position: Forward

Team information
- Current team: Lechia Gdańsk
- Number: 97

Youth career
- 2010–2011: Slavoj Vyšehrad
- 2011–2012: Slavia Prague
- 2012–2016: Petrocub Hîncești
- 2016–2018: Regal Sport București
- 2018–2019: Rapid București
- 2019–2022: Pescara

Senior career*
Years	Team	Apps	(Gls)
2020–2023	Pescara	6	(0)
2022–2023	→ FC U Craiova (loan)	10	(1)
2023–2025	FC U Craiova	32	(8)
2024–2025	→ Universitatea Cluj (loan)	37	(12)
2025–2026	Dynamo Kyiv	7	(0)
2026–	Lechia Gdańsk	8	(4)

International career
2021–2023	Moldova U21	9	(3)
2024	Romania U20	2	(0)
2023–2025	Romania U21	7	(0)
- * Club domestic league appearances and goals as of 8 November 2026

Vladislav Blănuță (Romanian pronunciation: [bləˈnut͡sə]; born 12 January 2002) is a professional footballer who plays as a forward for I liga club Lechia Gdańsk.

Born in Moldova, Blănuță began his senior career in 2019 with Italian club Pescara. Between 2022 and 2025, he featured in Romania for FC U Craiova and Universitatea Cluj, before earning a transfer to Ukrainian side Dynamo Kyiv.

Eligible to represent Moldova and Romania, Blănuță played for both countries at youth level and featured for Romania under-21 in the 2025 UEFA European Championship.

== Club career ==
=== Early career and Pescara ===
Blănuță began his youth career in the Czech Republic at age 10, playing for Slavoj Vyšehrad and Slavia Prague, before returning to his hometown in Moldova to join Petrocub Hîncești. Aged 14, he moved to Romania to join Regal Sport București and subsequently entered the academy of Rapid București.

After signing for Italian club Pescara in 2019, Blănuță made his professional debut on 27 December 2020, coming on in a 0–3 Serie B defeat against Virtus Entella.

=== FC U Craiova ===
On 4 September 2022, Blănuță joined Romanian club FC U Craiova on a season-long loan. He scored his first career goal on 3 February 2023, in a 5–0 home thrashing of Universitatea Cluj in the Liga I.

In May 2023, after appearing in 12 matches in all competitions, Blănuță's move was made permanent for a reported fee of €250,000 and 20% interest. During the 2023–24 season, he made 35 appearances and scored eight goals, but his club ended the campaign at the bottom of the table and was directly relegated.

On 12 July 2024, Blănuță returned to the Liga I on a one-year loan deal with Universitatea Cluj. He enjoyed a strong campaign in Cluj-Napoca, helping his team secure fourth place in the league while finishing as the sixth-highest goalscorer with 12 goals.

=== Dynamo Kyiv ===
On 3 September 2025, Blănuță signed a five-year contract with Ukrainian Premier League team Dynamo Kyiv. The transfer fee was reported to be between €2 million and €2.6 million, with up to €300,000 in bonuses, while a 20% sell-on clause was also retained by FC U Craiova. Shortly after his arrival, Blănuță was accused of having previously shared pro-Russian content on social media; the club stated he had admitted past mistakes and confirmed his pro-Ukrainian stance.

Blănuță made his official debut on 13 September 2025, in a 2–2 league draw with Obolon Kyiv. He came on as a 78th-minute substitute for Andriy Yarmolenko, but his appearance was met with hostility from sections of the crowd due to his past social media activity.

Blănuță scored his only goal for the club on 6 November 2025, netting in the 88th minute of a 6–0 home victory over Zrinjski Mostar in the UEFA Conference League league phase. Over the course of the remainder of the season, he fell out of favour, making only sporadic substitute appearances in the league and European competitions.

=== Lechia Gdańsk ===
On 29 August 2026, Blănuță moved to Polish side Lechia Gdańsk for a reported transfer fee of €1.5 million, signing a five-year contract.

== International career ==
Blănuță represented his birth country Moldova at youth international level until 2023, after which he opted to switch his allegiance to Romania.

Blănuță was named in the Romania under-21 squad for UEFA Euro 2025 and made an appearance in a group stage match against Spain on 14 June, but was sent off less than ten minutes after coming on as a substitute, with Romania eventually losing 1–2.

== Personal life ==
=== Family ===
Blănuță's father, Eduard, is a Moldovan football coach. According to Russian media, Blănuță has partial Russian ancestry through his grandfather and is fluent in the language.

=== Pro-Russian social media content controversy ===
Shortly after joining Dynamo Kyiv in September 2025, Blănuță faced criticism from Ukrainian press and fans alike for previously sharing pro-Russian content on social media platform TikTok, including videos of television host Vladimir Solovyov and the crime series Brigada.

Dynamo Kyiv issued an official statement in which it noted that Blănuță had acknowledged past mistakes, reaffirmed his support for Ukraine, expressed pride in representing the team, and would clarify his position in an upcoming interview on the club's official channel.

Despite this, his official debut on 13 September was marked by a hostile reception from parts of the Dynamo fanbase. Supporters displayed banners, chanted critical slogans, and threw objects toward the bench before his introduction. Upon entering the match in the 78th minute, Blănuță was met with whistles and boos.

== Career statistics ==
As of match played 8 November 2026

Appearances and goals by club, season and competition
Club	Season	League			National cup (Note: Includes Cupa României, Ukrainian Cup, Polish Cup)		Europe		Other		Total	
Club	Season	Division	Apps	Goals	Apps	Goals	Apps	Goals	Apps	Goals	Apps	Goals
Pescara	2020–21	Serie B	1	0	0	0	—		—		1	0
Pescara	2021–22	Serie C	5	0	0	0	—		1 (Note: Appearance in Serie C promotion play-offs)	0	6	0
Pescara	Total		6	0	0	0	—		1	0	7	0
FC U Craiova (loan)	2022–23	Liga I	10	1	2	0	—		0	0	12	1
FC U Craiova	2023–24	Liga I	31	8	4	0	—		—		35	8
FC U Craiova	2025–26	Liga III	1	0	0	0	—		—		1	0
FC U Craiova	Total		42	9	6	0	—		—		48	9
Universitatea Cluj (loan)	2024–25	Liga I	37	12	1	0	—		—		38	12
Dynamo Kyiv	2025–26	Ukrainian Premier League	7	0	1	0	3 (Note: Appearances in UEFA Conference League)	1	—		11	1
Lechia Gdańsk	2026–27	I liga	8	4	1	0	—		—		9	4
Career total			100	25	9	0	3	1	1	0	113	26

== Honours ==
Dynamo Kyiv

- Ukrainian Cup: 2025–26
