= David Sala =

Romanian footballer

Personal information
- Date of birth: 24 August 2004 (age 22)
- Place of birth: Brașov, Romania
- Height: 1.80 m (5 ft 11 in)
- Position: Defensive midfielder

Team information
- Current team: SR Brașov (on loan from Bihor Oradea)

Youth career
- 2015–2020: Colțea Brașov
- 2020–2023: Universitatea Craiova

Senior career*
Years	Team	Apps	(Gls)
2022–2024	Universitatea Craiova	8	(0)
2024	→ CSM Alexandria (loan)	6	(0)
2024–	Bihor Oradea	1	(0)
2025–	→ SR Brașov (loan)	0	(0)

International career^{‡}
2022	Romania U18	3	(0)
2022–2023	Romania U19	7	(0)
- * Club domestic league appearances and goals as of 24 August 2024 ‡ National team caps and goals as of 28 March 2023

David Sala (born 24 August 2004) is a Romanian professional footballer who plays as a defensive midfielder for Liga III club SR Brașov, on loan from Liga II club Bihor Oradea.

== Club career ==
=== Universitatea Craiova ===
While a junior at Coltea Brasov in 2020, Sala traveled to Spain club Celta de Vigo for a trial. He made his Liga I debut for Universitatea Craiova against Farul Constanța on 20 May 2022.

== Career statistics ==
As of match played 24 August 2024

Appearances and goals by club, season and competition
Club	Season	League			Cupa României		Europe		Other		Total	
Club	Season	Division	Apps	Goals	Apps	Goals	Apps	Goals	Apps	Goals	Apps	Goals
Universitatea Craiova	2021–22	Liga I	1	0	—		—		—		1	0
Universitatea Craiova	2022–23	Liga I	6	0	0	0	0	0	—		6	0
Universitatea Craiova	2023–24	Liga I	1	0	0	0	—		—		1	0
Universitatea Craiova	Total		8	0	0	0	0	0	0	0	8	0
CSM Alexandria (loan)	2023–24	Liga II	6	0	—		—		—		6	0
Bihor Oradea	2024–25	Liga II	1	0	1	0	—		—		2	0
SR Brașov (loan)	2024–25	Liga III	0	0	—		—		—		0	0
Career total			15	0	1	0	0	0	0	0	16	0
