= Valerică Găman =

Romanian footballer

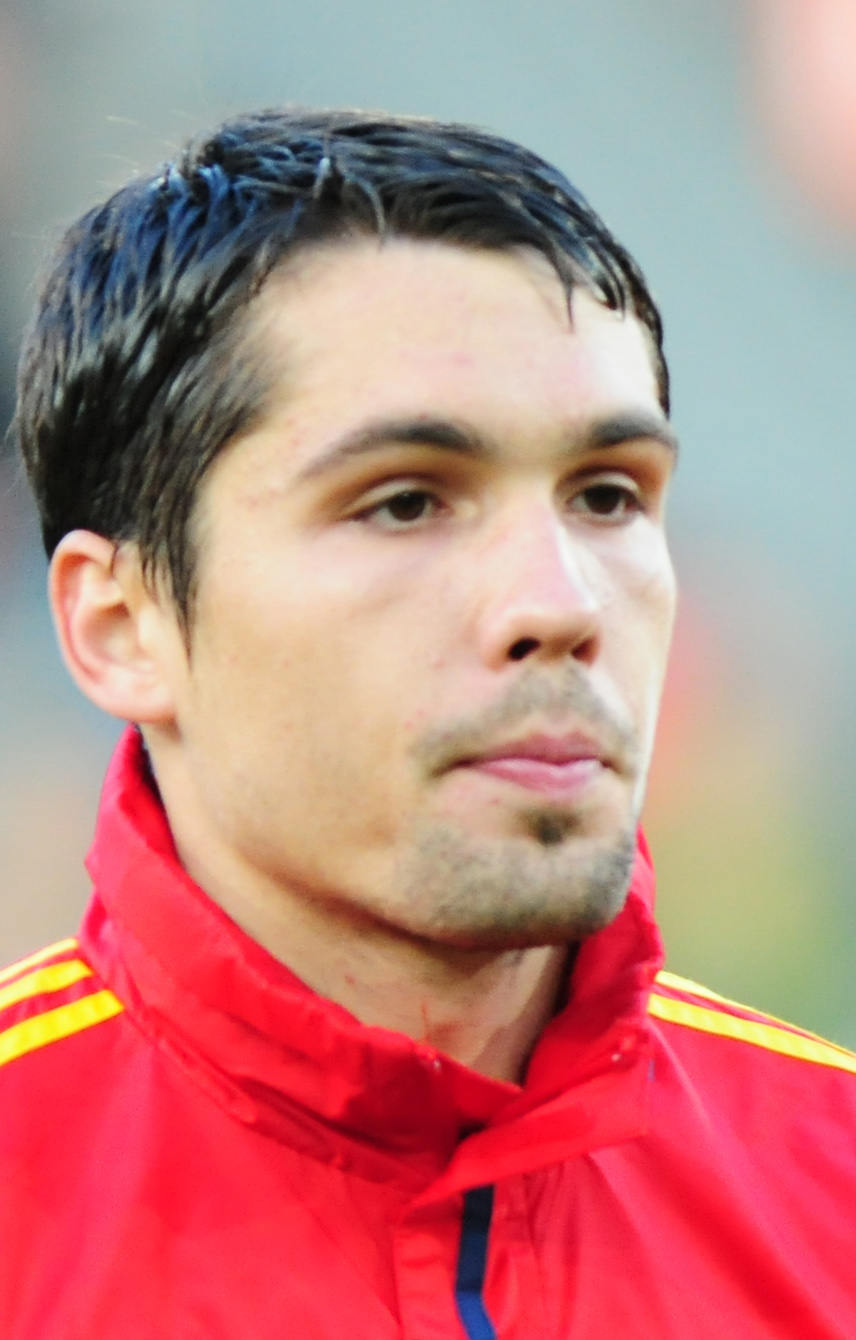
- Găman with Romania in 2012

Personal information
- Full name: Valerică Marius Găman
- Date of birth: 25 February 1989 (age 37)
- Place of birth: Băilești, Romania
- Height: 1.88 m (6 ft 2 in)
- Position: Centre-back

Team information
- Current team: Universitatea II Craiova (sporting director)

Youth career
- –2006: FC Universitatea Craiova

Senior career*
Years	Team	Apps	(Gls)
2006–2011	FC Universitatea Craiova	90	(3)
2011	Dinamo București	6	(0)
2011–2016	Astra Giurgiu	126	(15)
2016–2018	Karabükspor	27	(0)
2018	FCSB	5	(0)
2018–2019	Al-Shabab	27	(1)
2020–2021	Astra Giurgiu	25	(1)
2021–2023	Universitatea Craiova	32	(0)
2023–2025	Hermannstadt	55	(2)
Total		393	(22)

International career
2009–2010	Romania U21	16	(3)
2011–2017	Romania	14	(1)

Managerial career
- 2026–: Universitatea II Craiova (sporting director)
- * Club domestic league appearances and goals

Valerică Marius Găman (born 25 February 1989) is a Romanian former professional footballer who played as a centre-back, currently sporting director at Liga III club Universitatea II Craiova.

== Club career ==
=== Universitatea Craiova ===
Găman was the captain of Universitatea Craiova and a regular player for Romania U21. In February 2011 he was declared free agent, but in the meantime he signed a new contract with U Craiova, from 1 July 2011. So he played in the Spring of 2011 for Dinamo București, and returned to Craiova in July.

=== Astra Giurgiu ===
Following the disaffiliation of Universitatea, Găman was again declared free agent and signed on 3 August 2011, a contract for five years with Astra Giurgiu.

== Personal life ==
He has two brothers, one of them is Robert Irinel who was also a footballer at Universitatea Craiova and the other one is George who is a football referee.

== Career statistics ==
=== Club ===
As of match played 4 May 2025

Appearances and goals by club, season and competition
Club	Season	League			National cup (Note: Includes Cupa României, Turkish Cup, King's Cup)		League cup (Note: Includes Cupa Ligii)		Europe		Other		Total	
Club	Season	Division	Apps	Goals	Apps	Goals	Apps	Goals	Apps	Goals	Apps	Goals	Apps	Goals
FC Universitatea Craiova	2006–07	Liga I	3	0	0	0	—		—		—		3	0
FC Universitatea Craiova	2007–08	Liga I	8	0	0	0	—		—		—		8	0
FC Universitatea Craiova	2008–09	Liga I	33	1	0	0	—		—		—		33	1
FC Universitatea Craiova	2009–10	Liga I	29	1	2	0	—		—		—		31	1
FC Universitatea Craiova	2010–11	Liga I	17	1	3	1	—		—		—		20	2
FC Universitatea Craiova	Total		90	3	5	1	—		—		—		95	4
Dinamo București	2010–11	Liga I	6	0	2	0	—		—		—		8	0
Astra Giurgiu	2011–12	Liga I	27	3	2	0	—		—		—		29	3
Astra Giurgiu	2012–13	Liga I	27	2	2	1	—		—		—		29	3
Astra Giurgiu	2013–14	Liga I	27	1	5	0	—		4 (Note: Appearances in UEFA Europa League)	1	—		36	2
Astra Giurgiu	2014–15	Liga I	17	3	0	0	2	0	2	0	1 (Note: Appearance in Supercupa României)	0	22	3
Astra Giurgiu	2015–16	Liga I	28	6	0	0	1	0	6	0	—		35	6
Astra Giurgiu	Total		126	15	9	1	3	0	12	1	1	0	151	17
Karabükspor	2016–17	Süper Lig	17	0	0	0	—		—		—		17	0
Karabükspor	2017–18	Süper Lig	10	0	1	0	—		—		—		11	0
Karabükspor	Total		27	0	1	0	—		—		—		28	0
FCSB	2017–18	Liga I	5	0	0	0	—		2	0	—		7	0
Al-Shabab	2018–19	Saudi Professional League	27	1	1	0	—		—		—		28	1
Astra Giurgiu	2020–21	Liga I	25	1	3	1	—		—		—		28	2
Universitatea Craiova	2021–22	Liga I	17	0	1	0	—		1 (Note: Appearance(s) in UEFA Europa Conference League)	0	1	0	20	0
Universitatea Craiova	2022–23	Liga I	15	0	2	1	—		3	1	—		20	2
Universitatea Craiova	Total		32	0	3	1	—		4	1	1	0	40	2
Hermannstadt	2023–24	Liga I	32	2	2	0	—		—		—		34	2
Hermannstadt	2024–25	Liga I	23	0	2	0	—		—		—		25	0
Hermannstadt	Total		55	2	4	0	—		—		—		59	2
Career total			393	22	28	4	3	0	18	2	2	0	444	28

=== International ===
As of 4 September 2017

Appearances and goals by national team and year
National team	Year	Apps	Goals
Romania	2011	2	0
Romania	2012	7	1
Romania	2013	2	0
Romania	2014	1	0
Romania	2016	1	0
Romania	2017	1	0
Total		14	1

Scores and results list Romania's goal tally first, score column indicates score after each Găman goal.

List of international goals scored by Valerică Găman
No.	Date	Venue	Opponent	Score	Result	Competition
1	11 September 2012	Arena Națională, Bucharest, Romania	Andorra	3–0	4–0	2014 FIFA World Cup qualification

== Honours ==
Dinamo București

- Cupa României runner-up: 2010–11

Astra Giurgiu

- Liga I: 2015–16
- Cupa României: 2013–14
- Supercupa României: 2014

Universitatea Craiova

- Supercupa României: 2021

Hermannstadt

- Cupa României runner-up: 2024–25
