= Robert Silaghi =

Romanian footballer

Personal information
- Full name: Robert Mihai Silaghi
- Date of birth: 2 April 2002 (age 24)
- Place of birth: Gherla, Romania
- Height: 1.76 m (5 ft 9 in)
- Position: Midfielder

Team information
- Current team: Sepsi OSK
- Number: 7

Youth career
- 2011–2017: Viitorul Gherla
- 2017–2019: Viitorul Cluj
- 2019–2020: CFR Cluj

Senior career*
Years	Team	Apps	(Gls)
2020–2023	CFR Cluj	0	(0)
2020–2021	→ Farul Constanța (loan)	19	(0)
2022–2023	→ Unirea Slobozia (loan)	33	(1)
2023–2025	Universitatea Cluj	47	(1)
2025–	Sepsi OSK	32	(0)

International career^{‡}
2019	Romania U18	2	(0)
2024	Romania U21	2	(0)
- * Club domestic league appearances and goals as of 8 November 2026 ‡ National team caps and goals as of 15 October 2024

Robert Mihai Silaghi (born 2 April 2002) is a Romanian professional footballer who plays as a midfielder for Liga I club Sepsi OSK.

== Club career ==
Silaghi made his professional debut for Universitatea Cluj on 15 September 2023, in a 1–0 Liga I win to UTA Arad.
