= Daniel Lasure =

Spanish footballer

Dani Lasure
Personal information
- Full name: Daniel Lasure Briz
- Date of birth: 27 February 1994 (age 32)
- Place of birth: Zaragoza, Spain
- Height: 1.81 m (5 ft 11 in)
- Position: Left back

Team information
- Current team: Arenteiro
- Number: 16

Youth career
- Zaragoza
- Amistad
- –2013: Zaragoza

Senior career*
Years	Team	Apps	(Gls)
2013–2017	Deportivo Aragón	88	(1)
2016–2023	Zaragoza	58	(1)
2020	→ Tenerife (loan)	12	(0)
2020–2021	→ Leganés (loan)	5	(0)
2023	Eibar	2	(0)
2023–2024	Amorebieta	29	(0)
2024–2025	Universitatea Cluj	3	(0)
2026–	Arenteiro	13	(1)
- * Club domestic league appearances and goals as of 10 June 2026

Daniel "Dani" Lasure Briz (born 27 February 1994) is a Spanish footballer who plays as a left back for Primera Federación club Arenteiro.

== Club career ==
Born in Zaragoza, Aragón, Lasure played youth football with Real Zaragoza. He made his senior debut with the reserves on 29 September 2013, starting in a 4–0 Tercera División home routing of Atlético Calatayud.

Lasure made his professional debut on 7 September 2016, starting in a 1–2 home loss against Real Valladolid, for the season's Copa del Rey. The following 6 June he renewed his contract until 2021, being definitely promoted to the main squad ahead of the 2017–18 season.

Lasure made his Segunda División debut on 10 June 2017, starting in a 1–2 home loss against CD Tenerife. He subsequently became a regular starter for the side, and scored his first professional goal on 16 September of the following year, but in a 1–2 away loss against UD Almería.

On 16 January 2020, after losing his first-choice status, Lasure was loaned to fellow second division side Tenerife until the end of the season. On 22 September, he moved to fellow league team CD Leganés also in a temporary deal. On 18 March 2021, he was diagnosed with testicular cancer.

On 25 January 2022, already recovered and training with the squad, Lasure renewed with Zaragoza until 2023. He terminated his contract with the club on 4 January 2023, after being rarely used.

On 3 March 2023, after a trial period, Lasure signed a short-term deal with SD Eibar also in the second division. On 4 July, he moved to fellow league team SD Amorebieta.

On 2 February 2026, Lasure returned to Spanish football and joined Arenteiro in the third tier.

== Honours ==
Deportivo Aragón

- Tercera División: 2013–14
