= Dan Nistor =

Romanian footballer (born 1988)

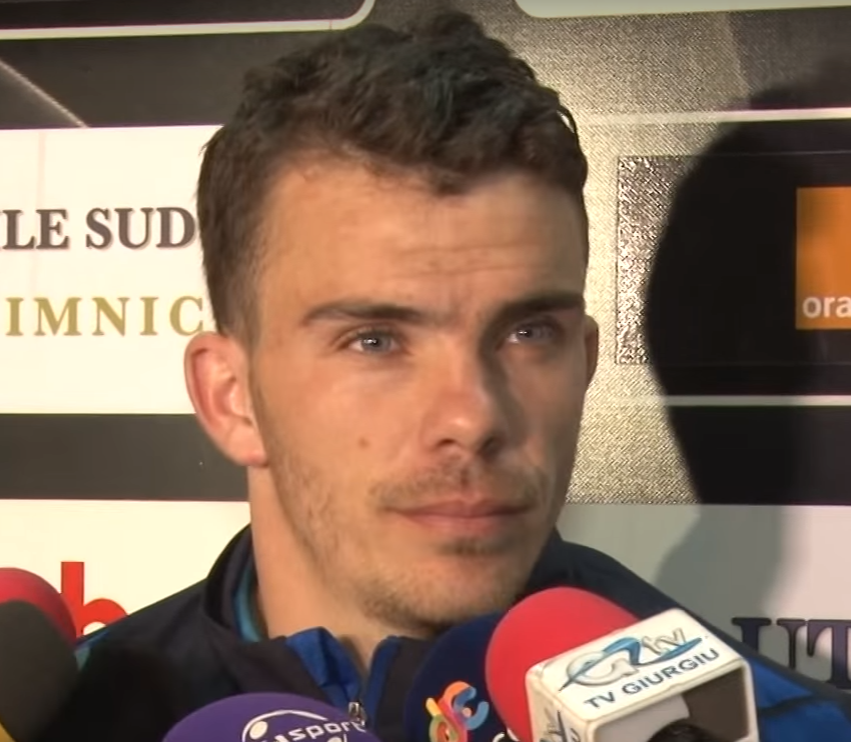
- Nistor in 2016

Personal information
- Full name: Dan Nicolae Nistor
- Date of birth: 6 May 1988 (age 38)
- Place of birth: Rucăr, Romania
- Height: 1.72 m (5 ft 8 in)
- Position: Midfielder

Team information
- Current team: Universitatea Cluj
- Number: 10

Senior career*
Years	Team	Apps	(Gls)
2005–2007	AS Rucăr		
2007–2010	Internațional Curtea de Argeș		
2008–2009	→ Muscelul Câmpulung (loan)		
2009–2010	→ Dacia Mioveni (loan)	28	(4)
2010–2013	Pandurii Târgu Jiu	97	(9)
2013–2015	Évian	6	(0)
2014–2015	→ Pandurii Târgu Jiu (loan)	45	(2)
2015–2016	Pandurii Târgu Jiu	35	(1)
2016–2017	Dinamo București	29	(3)
2017	CFR Cluj	17	(0)
2018–2019	Dinamo București	66	(9)
2020–2023	Universitatea Craiova	106	(12)
2023–	Universitatea Cluj	129	(35)

International career
2012–2020	Romania	8	(0)
- * Club domestic league appearances and goals as of 7 November 2026

Dan Nicolae Nistor (born 6 May 1988) is a Romanian professional footballer who plays as a midfielder for Liga I club Universitatea Cluj.

After starting his career in the lower leagues, Nistor established himself at Pandurii Târgu Jiu, where he made over 90 Liga I appearances between 2010 and 2013. His performances earned him a move to French club Evian, but he struggled for playing time and soon returned to Pandurii. From 2016, Nistor represented Dinamo București, CFR Cluj, Universitatea Craiova, and Universitatea Cluj. In 2026, he became the record holder for Liga I appearances, reaching 516.

Nistor made his senior international debut for Romania in November 2012, in a 2–1 victory over Belgium.

== Club career ==
=== Early career ===
Nistor did not play football at junior level, but in 2005 joined his hometown club AS Rucăr in the lower leagues. Roughly two years later, during a match against the reserves of Argeș Pitești, he impressed Internațional Curtea de Argeș owner Benone Lazăr who was in the attendance. Nistor was then transferred to the latter club at the cost of seven football balls.

After his first season at Internațional in the third league, Nistor was loaned to Muscelul Câmpulung and Dacia Mioveni, respectively. Upon his return to Curtea de Argeș in 2010, the team withdrew from the Liga I championship due to financial issues.

=== Pandurii Târgu Jiu ===
Nistor signed a four-year contract with Liga I team Pandurii Târgu Jiu in the summer of 2010. He played his first match in the top division on 23 July that year, featuring the full 90 minutes in a goalless draw with Unirea Urziceni. On 10 April 2011, he scored his first Liga I goal in a 4–2 home victory over Victoria Brănești.

Nistor made 35 appearances and netted six goals all competition comprised in the 2012–13 season, as Pandurii finished second in the championship and subsequently qualified for the UEFA Europa League. He made his debut in the latter competition on 16 July 2013, in a goalless away draw with Levadia Tallinn in the second qualifying round. His team went further after 4–0 on aggregate, and he recorded his first European goal in a 1–1 draw against Hapoel Tel Aviv on 1 August.

=== Evian ===
In August 2013, amid interest from FC Steaua București, CFR Cluj, and Málaga, Nistor joined French club Evian for a rumoured fee of €800,000. He struggled to establish himself as a starter, making only six Ligue 1 appearances during the first half of the 2013–14 season. Nistor initially attributed his lack of playing time partly to his nationality, but later apologised and said that his comments had been misunderstood.

=== Return to Pandurii Târgu Jiu ===
On 22 January 2014, Nistor was sent on loan to his former team Pandurii Târgu Jiu for a period of five months, which was later extended for the 2014–15 season. In the summer of 2015, after being released by Evian, he again joined the Alb-albaștrii as a free agent.

=== Dinamo București ===
On 31 August 2016, Nistor agreed to a two-year deal with fellow league club Dinamo București. He won his first career trophy on 20 May 2017, after "the Red Dogs" came victorious 2–0 in the Cupa Ligii final against ACS Poli Timișoara.

=== CFR Cluj ===
On 10 July 2017, Nistor joined CFR Cluj in a swap deal that sent Filipe Nascimento to Dinamo București. Under manager Dan Petrescu, he made 18 appearances across all competitions without scoring. In January 2018, Nistor publicly expressed dissatisfaction with his lack of playing time and Petrescu's communication.

=== Return to Dinamo București ===
Nistor terminated his contract with CFR Cluj and rejoined Dinamo București on 13 January 2018. He was assigned the number 10 shirt and played his first match upon return on 4 February, in a 2–2 Liga I draw with Universitatea Craiova.

On 29 July 2018, Nistor scored in a cross-town derby with FCSB, which ended 3–3. The following month, FCSB reportedly made several bids for the transfer of the midfielder; Dinamo however rejected each offer and proceeded in contract extension talks. Nistor registered 13 assists across the 2018–19 league season, the most for a player in the previous ten years, and was named by Liga Profesionistă de Fotbal in the best team of the campaign.

=== Universitatea Craiova ===
On 6 January 2020, Nistor signed a two-and-a-half-year contract with Universitatea Craiova for an undisclosed transfer fee. He made his debut on the 31st, in a 3–1 Liga I victory over Gaz Metan Mediaș, and scored his first goals on 4 March in a 2–3 Cupa României loss to Politehnica Iași.

On 23 June 2020, Nistor scored his first league goal for Craiova in a 2–1 home win over Botoșani. He then scored the winning penalty in a 2–1 victory over FCSB on 12 July. On 3 August, he opened the scoring in a 1–3 home defeat to CFR Cluj, which saw Craiova finish second as CFR secured their third consecutive title.

=== Universitatea Cluj ===
On 13 February 2023, Nistor moved to Universitatea Cluj, the city rival of his former club CFR Cluj.

Nistor recorded the best individual figures of his career in the 2023–24 season, with 16 goals and 12 assists in all competitions. On 3 August 2026, he made his 515th top-flight appearance in a 2–1 win over Botoșani, drawing level with Ionel Dănciulescu as the joint record holder for appearances in the Liga I.

== International career ==
On 4 June 2013, Nistor made his international debut for Romania in a 4–0 victory over Trinidad and Tobago at the Arena Națională in Bucharest. He previously played in two unofficial friendlies against Belgium and Poland, respectively.

His next caps for the nation only came during late 2019 under manager Cosmin Contra, appearing as a substitute in both UEFA Euro 2020 qualifiers against Norway (1–1 home draw) and Spain (0–5 home loss).

== Personal life ==
In February 2012, Nistor was caught driving an Audi A5 without a licence and was fined.

He has been married since June 2013, with fellow footballer Mihai Pintilii serving as his best man. His wife, Cosmina, gave birth to their son in April 2017.

== Career statistics ==
=== Club ===
As of match played 7 November 2026

Appearances and goals by club, season and competition
Club	Season	League			National cup (Note: Includes Cupa Romaniei, Coupe de France)		League cup (Note: Includes Cupa Ligii, Coupe de la Ligue)		Europe		Other		Total	
Club	Season	Division	Apps	Goals	Apps	Goals	Apps	Goals	Apps	Goals	Apps	Goals	Apps	Goals
Dacia Mioveni (loan)	2009–10	Liga II	28	4	0	0	—		—		—		28	4
Pandurii Târgu Jiu	2010–11	Liga I	26	1	2	0	—		—		—		28	1
Pandurii Târgu Jiu	2011–12	Liga I	33	2	3	0	—		—		—		36	2
Pandurii Târgu Jiu	2012–13	Liga I	33	6	2	0	—		—		—		35	6
Pandurii Târgu Jiu	2013–14	Liga I	5	0	—		—		4 (Note: Appearances in UEFA Europa League)	1	—		9	1
Pandurii Târgu Jiu	Total		97	9	7	0	—		4	1	—		108	10
Évian	2013–14	Ligue 1	6	0	1	0	2	0	—		—		9	0
Pandurii Târgu Jiu (loan)	2013–14	Liga I	14	1	—		—		—		—		14	1
Pandurii Târgu Jiu (loan)	2014–15	Liga I	31	1	3	0	4	1	—		—		38	2
Pandurii Târgu Jiu (loan)	Total		45	2	3	0	4	1	—		—		52	3
Pandurii Târgu Jiu	2015–16	Liga I	35	1	2	0	1	0	—		—		38	1
Dinamo București	2016–17	Liga I	29	3	2	1	4	2	—		—		35	6
CFR Cluj	2017–18	Liga I	17	0	1	0	—		—		—		18	0
Dinamo București	2017–18	Liga I	18	1	1	0	—		—		—		19	1
Dinamo București	2018–19	Liga I	32	4	2	4	—		—		—		34	8
Dinamo București	2019–20	Liga I	16	4	2	1	—		—		—		18	5
Dinamo București	Total		66	9	5	5	—		—		—		71	14
Universitatea Craiova	2019–20	Liga I	14	3	1	2	—		—		—		15	5
Universitatea Craiova	2020–21	Liga I	38	4	5	1	—		1	0	—		44	5
Universitatea Craiova	2021–22	Liga I	34	3	5	0	—		2 (Note: Appearances in UEFA Conference League)	0	1 (Note: Appearances in Supercupa României)	0	42	3
Universitatea Craiova	2022–23	Liga I	20	2	2	0	—		1	0	—		23	2
Universitatea Craiova	Total		106	12	13	3	—		4	0	1	0	124	15
Universitatea Cluj	2022–23	Liga I	12	3	3	1	—		—		—		15	4
Universitatea Cluj	2023–24	Liga I	36	13	6	2	—		—		2 (Note: Appearances in Liga I European play-offs)	1	44	16
Universitatea Cluj	2024–25	Liga I	39	11	0	0	—		—		—		39	11
Universitatea Cluj	2025–26	Liga I	31	8	3	0	—		2	0	—		36	8
Universitatea Cluj	2026–27	Liga I	11	0	1	0	—		3 (Note: One appearance in UEFA Europa League, two appearances in UEFA Conference League)	0	1	0	16	0
Universitatea Cluj	Total		129	35	13	3	—		5	0	3	1	150	39
Career total			562	75	47	12	11	3	13	1	4	1	637	92

=== International ===
As of 18 November 2020.

Appearances and goals by national team and year
National team	Year	Apps	Goals
Romania	2012	1	0
Romania	2013	2	0
Romania	2019	2	0
Romania	2020	3	0
Total		8	0

== Honours ==
Internațional Curtea de Argeș

- Liga III: 2007–08

Pandurii Târgu Jiu

- Cupa Ligii runner-up: 2014–15

Dinamo București

- Cupa Ligii: 2016–17

CFR Cluj

- Liga I: 2017–18

Universitatea Craiova

- Cupa României: 2020–21
- Supercupa României: 2021

Universitatea Cluj

- Cupa României runner-up: 2022–23, 2025–26
- Supercupa României runner-up: 2026

Individual

- Liga I Team of the Season: 2018–19, 2019–20
- Gazeta Sporturilor Romania Player of the Month: October 2023

Records

- Player with the most appearances in the Liga I: 521
