= Ampflwang im Hausruckwald =

- Municipality
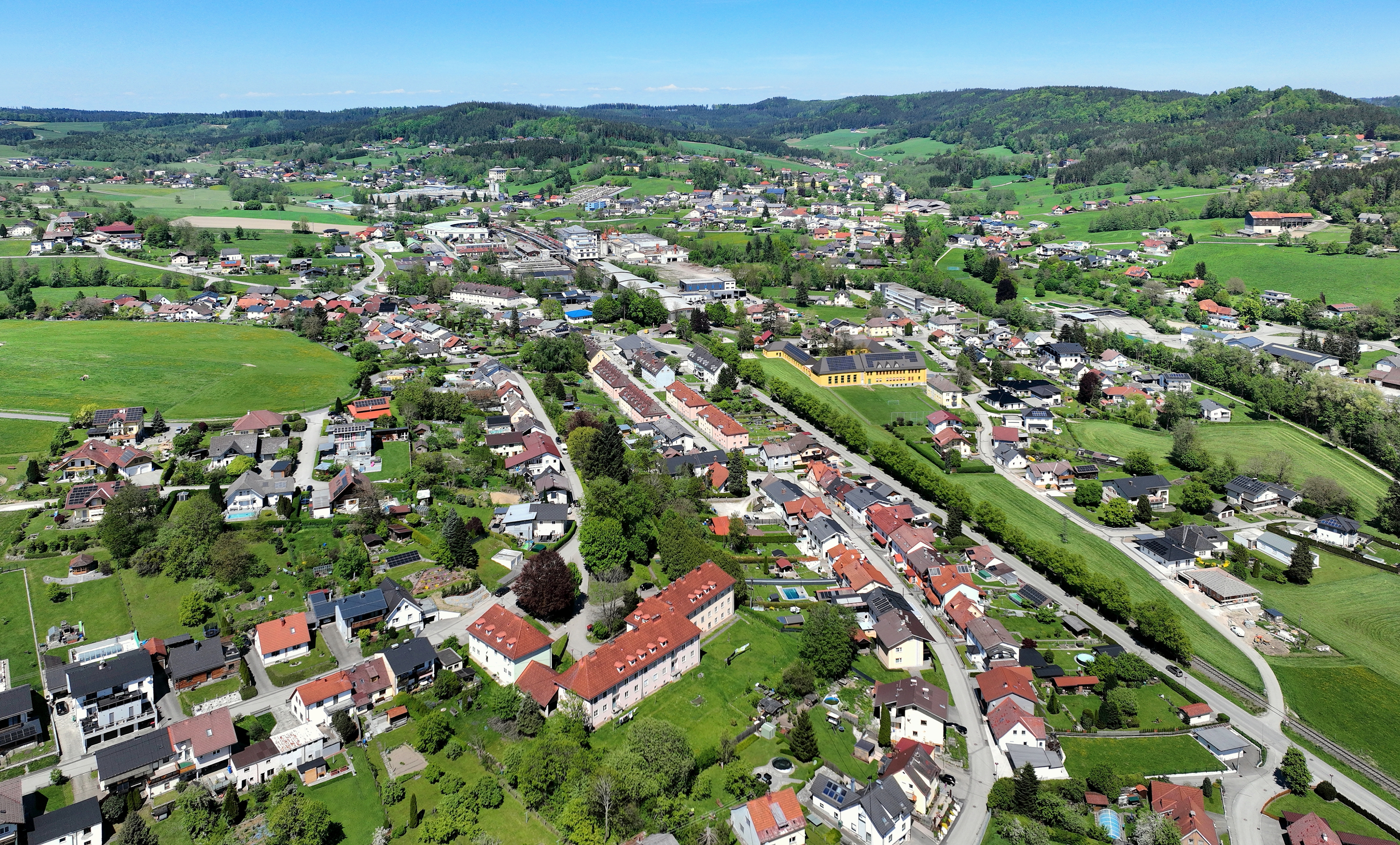
- South view of Ampflwang im Hausruckwald

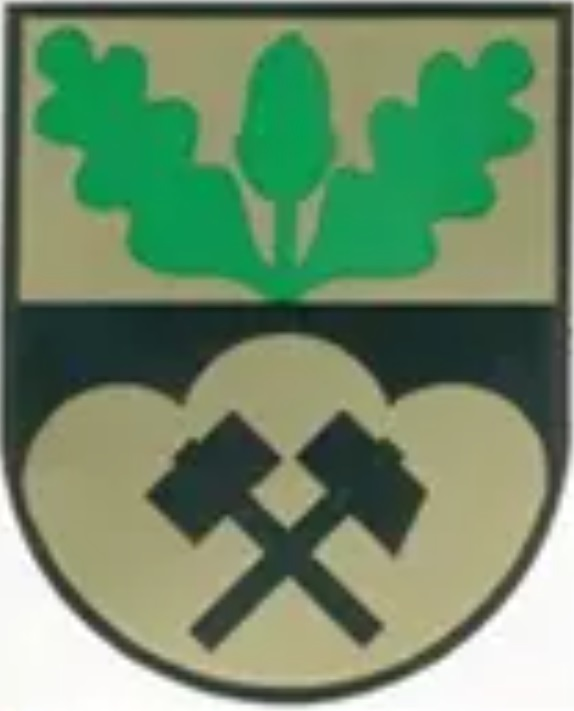
- Coat of arms

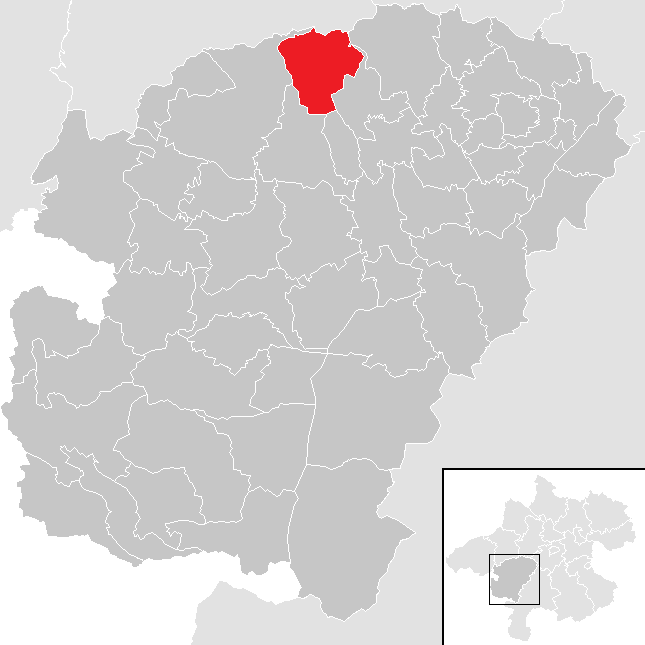
- Location in the district

- Location within Austria
- Coordinates: 48°05′34″N 13°34′00″E
- Country: Austria
- State: Upper Austria
- District: Vöcklabruck

Government
  - Mayor: Christian Kienast (SPÖ)

Area
  - Total: 20.57 km^{2} (7.94 sq mi)
- Elevation: 566 m (1,857 ft)

Population (2018-01-01)
  - Total: 3,376
  - Density: 164.1/km^{2} (425.1/sq mi)
- Time zone: UTC+1 (CET)
  - Summer (DST): UTC+2 (CEST)
- Postal code: 4843
- Area code: 07675
- Vehicle registration: VB
- Website: www.ampflwang.at

Ampflwang im Hausruckwald is a municipality in the district of Vöcklabruck in the Austrian state of Upper Austria.

== History ==
The village was first mentioned in documents in 1169 and was a farming settlement community until the discovery of lignite around 1766. In 1809, Ampflwang, like the rest of the Hausruckviertel, fell to Bavaria during the Napoleonic Wars, where it remained until 1814.

As lignite, and with it the Wolfsegg-Traunthaler-Kohlenwerks AG (WTK), which operated coal mining in the community, became more and more important, the number of inhabitants rose to over 2,000 after World War I. The consequence was the change from a peasant to an industrial employment structure. Ampflwang was elevated to the status of a market town in 1969 due to its economic importance in the Hausruckviertel. At the same time, the right to bear the municipal coat of arms was granted.

In the 1970s, the community reached a population of over 4000 people. As early as 1961, the municipal council decided to declare Ampflwang a tourist community. Since that time, the industrial town has transformed itself into a tourist community and is today known above all for its commitment to equestrian tourism.

Due to the fact that most of the coal had been mined out, the expiration of purchase contracts, and also the fact that the production costs of Ampflwang coal were higher than the world market prices, the mining operation was liquidated in 1995. Another small open pit mining operation has been closed in the meantime.

== Geography ==
Ampflwang im Hausruckwald is situated on the southern slope of the Hausruckwald, in the valley of the Ampflwangbach, which is formed by low hill ranges and runs from south to north. Its extension is 5.9 kilometers from north to south and 6 kilometers from west to east. The municipality has an area of 20.57 square kilometers. Of this, 28 percent is agricultural land and 58 percent is forested.

=== Municipal divisions and population ===
During the time when brown coal mining was still prevalent in the Hausruckviertel, many people moved to Ampflwang because they could find well-paid work in the mining industry, although not easy. In the 1961 census, Ampflwang reached its previous peak with 3,965 inhabitants. After WTK decided to close the Ampflwang plant for economic reasons on 25 May 1995, the municipality now has about 14.6 percent fewer inhabitants due to the resulting migration.

The municipal territory includes the following 18 localities (in parentheses number of inhabitants as of 1 January 2022):

- Aigen (182)
- Ampflwang (1228)
- Buchleiten (248)
- Eitzing (8)
- Hinterschlagen (96)
- Innerleiten (38)
- Lukasberg (132)
- Ort (120)
- Rabelsberg (120)
- Rödleiten (105)
- Schachen (163)
- Scheiblwies (83)
- Schmitzberg (83)
- Siedlung (560)
- Vorderschlagen (51)
- Waldpoint (91)
- Wassenbach (77)
- Wörmansedt (4)

The municipality is congruent with the cadastral municipality of Ampfelwang.

== Politics ==
The municipal council has 25 members.

- With the municipal and mayoral elections in Upper Austria 2009, the municipal council had the following distribution: 13 SPÖ, 7 ÖVP, 4 FPÖ and 1 BZÖ.
- With the municipal council and mayoral elections in Upper Austria 2015, the municipal council had the following distribution: 13 SPÖ, 7 ÖVP and 5 FPÖ.
- With the municipal council and mayoral elections in Upper Austria 2021, the municipal council has the following distribution: 14 SPÖ, 7 ÖVP and 4 FPÖ.

=== List of mayors since 1850 ===
- 1850–1858 Joseph Mayringer
- 1858–1861 Franz Innesberger
- 1861–1864 August Mayr
- 1864–1867 Josef Plötzeneder
- 1867–1870 Josef Nähmer
- 1870–1873 Anton Stokinger
- 1873–1876 Josef Kinast
- 1876–1879 Anton Brand
- 1879–1882 Josef Haas
- 1882–1885 Josef Plötzeneder
- 1885–1894 August Mayr
- 1894–1897 Josef Hochreiner
- 1897–1901 Josef Haas
- 1901–1903 Josef Plötzeneder
- 1903–1907 Leopold Mühringer
- 1907–1909 Franz Nöhammer
- 1909–1910 Karl Kienast
- 1910–1912 Anton Kienast
- 1912–1916 Josef Hötzinger
- 1916–1919 Josef Plötzeneder
- 1919–1924 Anton Brand
- 1924–1925 Josef Wambacher
- 1925–1927 Josef Huemer
- 1927–1929 Franz Eberl
- 1929–1934 Franz Huemer
- 1934–1934 Ludwig Irresberger
- 1934–1934 Franz Harringer
- 1934–1938 Albert Plötzeneder
- 1938–1942 Josef Braumann
- 1942–1943 Johann Pachinger
- 1943–1943 Franz Enser
- 1943–1945 Franz Redlinger
- 1945–1945 Paul Neulentner
- 1945–1945 Johann Doppler
- 1945–1945 Paul Neulentner
- 1945–1968 Johann Doppler
- 1968–1997 Roland Kaltenbrunner
- 1997–2015 Rosemarie Schönpass
- 2015–2021 Monika Pachinger (SPÖ)
- seit 2021 Christian Kienast (SPÖ)

== Coat of arms ==
Coat of arms of Ampflwang im Hausruckwald
Granted 21 February 1969 Escutcheon Per fess Or, an acorn on a two-leaved stalk issuant from the fessline Vert, and Sable, a mount of three coupeaux Or, charged with hammer and mallet in saltire Sable. Symbolism The oak leaf with acorn is borrowed from the coat of arms of the Khevenhüllerr family, who, as the former owners of Frankenburg (1581-1910), also held part of the landlords in the present-day municipality of Ampflwang; however, the depiction also points to the location of the market in the Hausruckwald. - Hammer and mallet remind us of the economic importance of lignite mining in the Hausruck region at that time, the centre of which was Ampflwang after the First World War.
