= 2023–24 FC Universitatea Cluj season =

FC Universitatea Cluj seasons

Universitatea Cluj
2023–24 season
- Owners: Cluj-Napoca Municipality; Babeș-Bolyai University; U Cluj Supporters Association
- Chairman: Radu Constantea
- Manager: Ioan Sabău
- Stadium: Cluj Arena
- Liga I: 10th
- Cupa României: Semi-finals
- Top goalscorer: League: Dan Nistor (14); All: Dan Nistor (16)
- Average home league attendance: 8,771
Home colours	Away colours

The 2023–24 season is the 98rd season of competitive football by Universitatea Cluj, and the 2nd in Liga I, after being promoted at the end of the 2021-22 Liga II season. Universitatea Cluj will compete in the Liga I and in Cupa României.

== Previous season positions ==
	Competition	Position
(Romania)	Liga I	10th
(Romania)	Cupa României	Final

== First-team squad ==
Last updated on 5 March 2024

Squad No.	Name	Nationality	Position(s)	Date of Birth (Age)
Goalkeepers
12	Iustin Chirilă	(Romania)	GK	21 May 2006 (age 19)
23	Plamen Iliev	(Bulgaria)	GK	30 November 1992 (age 32)
33	Andrei Gorcea	(Romania)	GK	2 August 2001 (age 24)
Defenders
2	Thalisson	(Brazil)	CB	7 May 1998 (age 27)
3	Bogdan Mitrea	(Romania)	CB	16 March 1984 (age 41)
17	Andrei Pițian	(Romania)	CB	31 January 1993 (age 32)
25	Lucas Masoero	(Argentina)	CB	6 June 1988 (age 37)
26	Dorinel Oancea	(Romania)	RB	2 April 1997 (age 28)
41	Alin Techereș	(Romania)	LB	5 January 2007 (age 18)
43	Alin Chinteș	(Romania)	RB	7 February 2006 (age 19)
77	Andrei Peteleu	(Romania)	RB	August 20, 1992 (age 31)
93	Răzvan Călăgur	(Romania)	LB	6 April 2006 (age 19)
Midfielders
4	Kevin Doukouré	(Ivory Coast)	CM	30 March 1999 (age 26)
8	Roger	(Brazil)	AM	1 March 1996 (age 29)
10	Dan Nistor	(Romania)	CM	6 May 1988 (age 37)
21	Marco Fossati	(Italy)	DM	5 October 1995 (age 30)
24	Ante Roguljić	(Croatia)	AM	11 March 1996 (age 29)
42	Alexandru Bota	(Romania)	CM	3 September 1982 (age 43)
94	Ovidiu Bic	(Romania)	CM	19 January 1999 (age 26)
96	Robert Silaghi	(Romania)	AM	16 October 1991 (age 34)
98	Gabriel Simion	(Romania)	DM	30 May 1998 (age 27)
Forwards
9	Filip Ilie	(Romania)	CF	15 July 2002 (age 23)
11	Dragoș Tescan	(Romania)	CF	15 September 1999 (age 26)
19	Daniel Popa	(Romania)	CF	14 July 1995 (age 30)
20	Valentin Gheorghe	(Romania)	LW	14 February 1997 (age 28)
27	Alexandru Chipciu (captain)	(Romania)	RW	18 May 1989 (age 36)
30	Luca Nagy	(Romania)	CF	20 February 2006 (age 19)
32	Federico Anselmo	(Argentina)	CF	11 June 1994 (age 31)
71	Ștefan Pănoiu	(Romania)	RW	23 September 2002 (age 23)

== Pre-season and friendlies ==
Win Draw Loss

== Competitions ==
Win Draw Loss

=== Overview ===
Competition	First match	Last match	Starting round	Final position	Record							
Competition	First match	Last match	Starting round	Final position	Pld	W	D	L	GF	GA	GD	Win %
Liga I	16 July 2023	12 May 2024	Matchday 1	10th	23	8	8	7	30	33	−3	34.78
Cupa României	31 August 2023	18 April 2024	Group stage	Semi-finals	6	4	1	1	14	6	+8	66.67
Total					29	12	9	8	44	39	+5	41.38

Last updated: 2 February 2024
Source: Competitions

=== Liga I ===
The Liga I fixture list was announced on July 1, 2023.

==== League table ====
Pos	Team	Pld	W	D	L	GF	GA	GD	Pts	Qualification
5	Farul Constanța	30	11	10	9	37	38	−1	43 (Note: Head to head points: Farul Constanța 6, Sepsi OSK 0)	Qualification to play-off round
6	Sepsi OSK	30	12	7	11	43	34	+9	43	Qualification to play-off round
7	Universitatea Cluj	30	10	12	8	35	38	−3	42	Qualification to play-out round
8	UTA Arad	30	10	10	10	36	43	−7	40 (Note: Head to head points: UTA 3 (+1), Hermannstadt 3 (-1))	Qualification to play-out round
9	Hermannstadt	30	9	13	8	36	31	+5	40	Qualification to play-out round

Source: , Soccerway
Rules for classification: 1) Points; 2) Head-to-head points; 3) Head-to-head goal difference; 4) Head-to-head goals scored; 5) Goal difference; 6) Goals scored; 7) Play-off.
Notes:

Pos	Team	Pld	W	D	L	GF	GA	GD	Pts	Qualification	FCS	CFR	UCV	FAR	SEP	RAP
1	FCSB (C)	10	5	2	3	12	11	+1	49	Qualification to Champions League first qualifying round		0–1	2–0	2–1	2–1	2–2
2	CFR Cluj	10	6	1	3	19	14	+5	46	Qualification to Conference League second qualifying round	0–1		1–2	5–1	2–1	3–2
3	Universitatea Craiova (O)	10	6	1	3	18	14	+4	44	Qualification to European competition play-offs	2–0	0–1		1–2	3–2	2–1
4	Farul Constanța	10	4	2	4	19	20	−1	36		0–1	5–1	3–3		1–4	3–1
5	Sepsi OSK	10	3	3	4	17	17	0	34		2–2	1–1	1–3	1–1		3–2
6	Rapid București	10	1	1	8	13	22	−9	32		2–0	1–4	1–2	1–2	0–1	

Source: Soccerway, FRF (in Romanian), LPF (in Romanian)
Rules for classification: 1) Points; 2) Points without rounding; 3) Points in the regular season; 4) Head-to-head points; 5) Head-to-head goal difference; 6) Head-to-head goals scored; 7) Goal difference; 8) Goals scored; 9) Play-off (only if needed to decide champion or teams for UEFA competitions). (Note: only criteria 7 and 8 are applied to establish the classification during the competition.) Source: https://m.digisport.ro/fotbal/liga-1/departajarea-in-play-off-ul-si-play-out-ul-din-liga-1-si-liga-2-explicata-de-frf-1639959
(C) Champions; (O) Play-off winners

Pos	Team	Pld	W	D	L	GF	GA	GD	Pts	Qualification or relegation	UTA	OTE	HER	UCJ	PET	IAS	DIN	BOT	VOL	FCU
7	UTA Arad (Note: Club was ineligible to advance to the European competition play-offs because it did not receive a UEFA license.)	9	5	2	2	15	11	+4	37			3–1	1–3					1–0	4–3	3–1
8	Oțelul Galați	9	6	1	2	11	7	+4	36	Qualification to European competition play-offs			1–0	1–0		1–0	1–0	2–0		
9	Hermannstadt (Note: Club was ineligible to advance to the European competition play-offs because it did not receive a UEFA license.)	9	4	2	3	13	7	+6	34					1–1	2–0	0–1	3–0	1–1		
10	Universitatea Cluj	9	3	3	3	12	10	+2	33	Qualification to European competition play-offs	0–0				1–2	1–0	3–3	3–0		
11	Petrolul Ploiești	9	3	2	4	8	14	−6	29		1–1	2–1						1–2	0–4	1–0
12	Politehnica Iași	9	3	1	5	7	8	−1	27		0–2				2–0				3–1	0–0
13	Dinamo București (O)	9	2	4	3	10	12	−2	25	Qualification to relegation play-offs	2–0				1–1	1–0			1–1	
14	Botoșani (O)	9	4	2	3	11	11	0	25	Qualification to relegation play-offs						2–1	2–1		0–0	4–1
15	Voluntari (R)	9	2	4	3	11	10	+1	24	Relegation to 2024–25 Liga II		1–1	1–0	0–1						0–0
16	FC U Craiova (R)	9	1	3	5	8	16	−8	22	Relegation to 2024–25 Liga II		1–2	1–3	3–2			1–1			

Source: Soccerway, FRF (in Romanian), LPF (in Romanian)
Rules for classification: 1) Points; 2) Points without rounding; 3) Points in the regular season; 4) Head-to-head points; 5) Head-to-head goal difference; 6) Head-to-head goals scored; 7) Goal difference; 8) Goals scored; 9) Play-off (only if needed to decide teams for relegation). (Note: only criteria 7 and 8 are applied to establish the classification during the competition.) Source: https://m.digisport.ro/fotbal/liga-1/departajarea-in-play-off-ul-si-play-out-ul-din-liga-1-si-liga-2-explicata-de-frf-1639959
(O) Play-off winners; (R) Relegated

==== Results summary ====
Overall								Home						Away					
Pld	W	D	L	GF	GA	GD	Pts	W	D	L	GF	GA	GD	W	D	L	GF	GA	GD
30	10	12	8	35	38	−3	42	5	4	6	14	19	−5	5	8	2	21	19	+2

Last updated: 2 February 2024.

===== Results by round =====
Round	1	2	3	4	5	6	7	8	9	10	11	12	13	14	15	16	17	18	19	20	21	22	23	24	25	26	27	28	29	30
Ground	A	H	A	H	A	H	A	H	A	H	A	H	A	A	H	H	A	H	A	H	A	H	A	H	A	H	A	H	H	A
Result	D	L	W	D	D	L	D	L	W	D	D	W	D	W	L	D	W	W	W	L	L	W	L	L	D	D	D	W	W	D
Position	9	13	9	10	10	12	11	15	10	12	11	8	8	8	9	10	7	6	5	6	8	7	7	8	7	9	9	6	6	7

Updated to match(es) played on 20 July 2024. Source: worldfootball
A = Away; H = Home; W = Win; D = Draw; L = Loss

==== Matches ====
Win Draw Loss

== Statistics ==
=== Appearances and goals ===
As of 2 February 2024

No.	Pos	Player	Liga I		Cupa României		Total	
No.	Pos	Player	Apps	Goals	Apps	Goals	Apps	Goals

=== Squad statistics ===
	Liga I	Cupa României	Home	Away	Total Stats
Games played	30	0	0	0	0
Games won	10	0	0	0	0
Games drawn	12	0	0	0	0
Games lost	8	0	0	0	0
Goals scored	35	0	0	0	0
Goals conceded	38	0	0	0	0
Goal difference	-3	0	0	0	0
Clean sheets	0	0	0	0	0
Goal by Substitute	0	0	0	0	0
Players used	–	–	–	–	–
Yellow cards	0	0	0	0	0
Red cards	0	0	0	0	0
Winning rate	0%	0%	0%	0%	0%

Last updated: 2 February 2024
Source: Competitive matches

=== Goalscorers ===
As of 2 February 2024

Rank	Position	Name	Liga I	Cupa României	Total
Total			0	0	0

=== Clean sheets ===
As of 2024

Rank	Name	Liga I	Cupa României	Total	Games played
Total		0	0	0	0

=== Attendances ===
As of 2024

	Matches	Attendances	Average	High	Low
Liga I	0	0	0	0	0
Cupa României	0	0	0	0	0
Total	0	0	0	0	0

== See also ==
- 2023–24 Liga I
- 2023–24 Cupa României
