= List of Romanian football transfers summer 2020 =

This is a list of Romanian football transfers for the 2020 summer transfer window. Only moves featuring 2020–21 Liga I and 2020–21 Liga II are listed.

== Liga I ==
=== Academica Clinceni ===
In:

No.	Pos.	Nation	Player
4	DF	ALB	Amir Bilali (from (Albania) Partizani Tirana)
5	DF	ROU	Florin Gardoș (from Universitatea Craiova)
6	DF	BUL	Georgi Pashov (from (Kazakhstan) Zhetysu)
7	MF	ROU	Petrișor Petrescu (from Hermannstadt)
8	MF	BUL	Asen Chandarov (from (Bulgaria) Septemvri Sofia)
9	FW	MDA	Alexandru Boiciuc (from (Ukraine) Karpaty Lviv)
10	MF	ROU	Cristian Tănase (from (Turkey) Giresunspor)
14	FW	ROU	Raul Rusescu (from (Turkey) Giresunspor)
15	DF	AUT	Mladen Jutrić (from (Cyprus) Doxa Katokopias)
17	MF	ROU	Ciprian Gliga (loan return from Concordia Chiajna)
18	MF	ROU	Florinel Sandu (on loan from Sport Team București)
20	MF	ROU	Marian Șerban (on loan from Universitatea Craiova)
23	FW	BUL	Tsvetelin Chunchukov (on loan from (Bulgaria) Slavia Sofia)
24	MF	ARG	Juan Cascini (from Botoșani)
25	MF	ROU	Andrei Cordea (from (Italy) Novara, previously on loan at Hermannstadt)
28	MF	ROU	Răzvan Andronic (on loan from CFR Cluj)
44	MF	ROU	Lucian Dumitriu (from Hermannstadt)
45	MF	ROU	Aleksandru Longher (from Politehnica Iași)

Out:

No.	Pos.	Nation	Player
6	DF	ESP	David Bollo (to Ararat-Armenia)
7	MF	COD	Aristote N'Dongala (to Free agent)
7	FW	ROU	Cristian Dumitru (loan return to FCSB, previously on loan)
9	FW	ROU	Alexandru Buziuc (to FCSB)
14	DF	ROU	Gabriel Matei (to Argeș Pitești)
17	DF	ROU	Cristian Albu (loan return to Concordia Chiajna, later on loan to UTA Arad)
18	DF	GRE	Giannis Kontoes (loan return to CFR Cluj, later signed by (Greece) Panionios)
20	FW	ROU	Robert Ion (loan return to FCSB)
23	DF	ROU	Florin Bejan (loan return to Dinamo București)
25	MF	ROU	George Merloi (to Astra Giurgiu)
33	GK	POR	Miguel Santos (loan return to Astra Giurgiu)
44	DF	ROU	Vlad Motroc (to CSM Slatina, previously signed from Argeș Pitești)
77	FW	SVK	Jakub Vojtuš (to CFR Cluj)
89	MF	ROU	Adrian Șut (loan return to FCSB)
96	FW	TUN	Sofien Moussa (to Free agent)
—	DF	ISR	Alon Netzer (to Free agent)

=== Argeș Pitești ===
In:

No.	Pos.	Nation	Player
4	MF	PAR	David Meza (from Petrolul Ploiești)
11	MF	ROU	Stephan Drăghici (on loan from Universitatea Craiova, previously on loan at Gaz Metan Mediaș)
12	GK	ROU	Alexandru Greab (from Concordia Chiajna)
16	DF	ROU	Gabriel Matei (from Academica Clinceni)
18	FW	SEN	Mediop Ndiaye (from Dunărea Călărași)
22	GK	ROU	Flavius Croitoru (from Mioveni)
23	FW	ROU	Cătălin Barbu (from Chindia Târgoviște)
24	MF	POR	Sérgio Marakis (from (Portugal) Cova Piedade)
26	MF	ROU	Gabriel Deac (from Petrolul Ploiești)
28	FW	SUI	Cephas Malele (from (Portugal) Oliveirense)
89	MF	ROU	Georgian Honciu (from Dunărea Călărași)

Out:

No.	Pos.	Nation	Player
1	GK	MDA	Sebastian Agachi (loan return to Viitorul Constanța, later on loan to Farul Constanța)
4	DF	ROU	Denis Brînzan (to CSM Reșița)
11	MF	ROU	Nini Popescu (to CSM Reșița)
12	GK	ROU	Răzvan Ducan (loan return to FCSB, later on loan to Turris Turnu Măgurele)
13	DF	ROU	Vlad Motroc (to Academica Clinceni, later signed by CSM Slatina)
13	FW	ROU	André Cozma (to Mioveni, previously signed from Hușana Huși)
16	DF	FRA	Kevin Moihedja (to (Belgium) Olympic Charleroi)
18	DF	ROU	Dorinel Oancea (to Mioveni)
20	MF	ROU	Răzvan Matiș (loan return to Viitorul Constanța, later on loan to Petrolul Ploiești)
21	FW	ROU	Vasile Buhăescu (to Petrolul Ploiești)
23	MF	ROU	Ovidiu Rașoveanu (to CSM Reșița)
24	FW	BIH	Nedo Turković (to Free agent)

=== Astra Giurgiu ===
In:

No.	Pos.	Nation	Player
2	DF	POR	Hugo Sousa (from (Greece) Aris)
7	MF	CRO	Dario Čanađija (from (Croatia) Gorica)
8	MF	SUI	Sébastien Wüthrich (from (Switzerland) Servette)
12	GK	ROU	Mihai Popa (loan return from Rapid București)
18	GK	POR	Miguel Santos (loan return from Academica Clinceni)
25	DF	ROU	Valerică Găman (from (Saudi Arabia) Al-Shabab)
27	MF	ROU	Romario Moise (loan return from UTA Arad)
43	FW	ITA	Mattia Montini (from Dinamo București)
80	MF	ROU	George Merloi (from Academica Clinceni)
92	MF	ROU	Robert Riza (from FC U Craiova)

Out:

No.	Pos.	Nation	Player
6	MF	ROU	Gabriel Simion (loan return to FCSB)
7	FW	ROU	Denis Alibec (to (Turkey) Kayserispor)
10	MF	ROU	Ciprian Biceanu (to Concordia Chiajna)
15	MF	ROU	Robert Boboc (on loan to CSM Reșița, previously on loan at Dunărea Călărași)
17	FW	NGA	Goodness Ajayi (to Free agent)
18	GK	POR	Miguel Santos (to (Netherlands) Roda JC Kerkrade, previously on loan at Academica Clinceni)
30	DF	ROU	Gabriel Tamaș (to Universitatea Cluj)
30	DF	ROU	Alexandru Dandea (to Rapid București)
33	GK	BUL	Georgi Kitanov (to Petrolul Ploiești)
88	FW	FRA	Julien Bègue (to (France) Le Mans)
—	DF	ROU	Radu Crișan (on loan to Rapid București, previously on loan at UTA Arad)

=== Botoșani ===
In:

No.	Pos.	Nation	Player
5	DF	ROU	Florin Plămadă (from Metaloglobus București)
23	GK	ROU	Mario Contra (from ACS Poli Timișoara, previously on loan at ASU Politehnica Timișoara)
26	FW	FRA	Hervin Ongenda (from (Italy) Chievo)
38	DF	FRA	Baba Touré (from (France) Le Puy Foot)
69	MF	ROU	Bogdan Melinte (loan return from Bucovina Rădăuți)
80	MF	ROU	Andrei Tîrcoveanu (from Viitorul Constanța, previously on loan at Concordia Chiajna)

Out:

No.	Pos.	Nation	Player
3	DF	GRE	Nikos Baxevanos (on loan to Politehnica Iași, previously signed from (Italy) Lazio)
9	FW	GER	Reagy Ofosu (to Universitatea Craiova)
14	MF	BEL	Alessio Carlone (Retired)
16	MF	ROU	Dragoș Penescu (to Dinamo II București, previously on loan at Universitatea Cluj)
17	FW	CRO	Marko Dugandžić (to (Russia) Sochi)
18	MF	AUT	Mario Ebenhofer (to (Germany) SGV Freiberg)
22	GK	MDA	Ianoș Brînză (on loan to Politehnica Iași)
23	MF	ARG	Juan Cascini (to Academica Clinceni)
31	MF	ROU	Alexandru Piftor (to SCM Gloria Buzău, previously on loan at Chindia Târgoviște)
77	FW	ROU	George Cîmpanu (to Universitatea Craiova)
87	MF	ITA	Bryan Mendoza (on loan to Petrolul Ploiești)

=== CFR Cluj ===
In:

No.	Pos.	Nation	Player
4	DF	ROU	Cristian Manea (from (Cyprus) Apollon Limassol, previously on loan)
5	MF	BRA	Soares (from (Portugal) Gil Vicente)
14	DF	ROU	Iasmin Latovlevici (from (Hungary) Kisvárda)
22	FW	CRO	Gabriel Debeljuh (from Hermannstadt)
29	GK	ROU	Rareș Murariu (on loan from ASU Politehnica Timișoara)
34	GK	ROU	Cristian Bălgrădean (from FCSB)
77	FW	SVK	Jakub Vojtuš (from Academica Clinceni)
98	MF	ROU	Nicolae Carnat (from Sepsi Sfântu Gheorghe)

Out:

No.	Pos.	Nation	Player
1	GK	ESP	Jesús Fernández (to Sepsi Sfântu Gheorghe, previously on loan at (Greece) Panetolikos)
5	MF	MLI	Yacouba Sylla (to Free agent)
17	MF	ROU	Sebastian Mailat (on loan to Voluntari, previously on loan at Universitatea Cluj)
20	FW	ROU	George Țucudean (Retired)
21	DF	CIV	Kévin Boli (to (Turkey) Samsunspor, previously on loan and later signed from (China) Guizhou Hengfeng)
23	FW	ROU	Cătălin Golofca (on loan to Sepsi Sfântu Gheorghe)
33	DF	ROU	Mihai Butean (on loan to Gaz Metan Mediaș, previously on loan)
37	MF	ROU	Mihai Bordeianu (to (Saudi Arabia) Al-Qadsiah)
62	MF	ROU	Claudiu Petrila (on loan to Sepsi Sfântu Gheorghe)
87	GK	LTU	Giedrius Arlauskis (to (Saudi Arabia) Al-Shabab)
89	GK	ROU	Otto Hindrich (on loan to ASU Politehnica Timișoara)
90	FW	CIV	Lacina Traoré (to (Turkey) Bandırmaspor)
91	MF	ROU	Răzvan Andronic (on loan to Academica Clinceni)
97	MF	ROU	Alin Fică (on loan to Rapid București)
—	DF	ROU	Răzvan Horj (to Gaz Metan Mediaș, previously on loan at Universitatea Cluj)
—	DF	ROU	Rareș Ispas (on loan to Comuna Recea, previously on loan at CSM Reșița)
—	DF	GRE	Giannis Kontoes (to (Greece) Panionios, previously on loan at Academica Clinceni)
—	DF	ROU	Alex Pașcanu (on loan to (Spain) Ponferradina, previously on loan at Voluntari)
—	DF	ROU	Andrei Radu (to Dinamo București, previously on loan at Politehnica Iași)

=== Chindia Târgoviște ===
In:

No.	Pos.	Nation	Player
1	GK	ROU	Rareș Pop (from Universitatea Cluj)
8	MF	ROU	Marco Dulca (on loan from Viitorul Constanța)
10	FW	ROU	Mihai Neicuțescu (on loan from Dinamo București)
14	FW	ARG	Tomás Díaz (on loan from Sepsi Sfântu Gheorghe)
19	FW	ROU	Daniel Popa (on loan from Dinamo București)
48	DF	MLI	Bourama Fomba (from Ceahlăul Piatra Neamț, previously on loan at Politehnica Iași)
66	DF	ROU	Paul Iacob (on loan from Viitorul Constanța)
98	DF	ROU	Tiberiu Căpușă (on loan from Viitorul Constanța)

Out:

No.	Pos.	Nation	Player
1	GK	ROU	Iustin Popescu (to Mioveni)
4	DF	ROU	Alexandru Benga (to UTA Arad)
8	MF	ROU	Daniel Novac (to Universitatea Cluj)
10	MF	ROU	Liviu Mihai (to Turris Turnu Măgurele)
18	DF	FRA	Bradley Diallo (to FC U Craiova)
23	MF	ROU	Alexandru Piftor (loan return to Botoșani, later signed by SCM Gloria Buzău)
48	FW	CRO	Josip Ivančić (to (Bosnia and Herzegovina) Zrinjski Mostar)
55	MF	CRO	Filip Dangubić (to (Slovenia) Celje)
94	MF	ROU	Ovidiu Bic (loan return to Universitatea Craiova)
99	FW	ROU	Cătălin Barbu (to Argeș Pitești)

=== Dinamo București ===
In:

No.	Pos.	Nation	Player
1	GK	ESP	Tomás Mejías (on loan from (England) Middlesbrough)
3	DF	ROU	Andrei Radu (from CFR Cluj, previously on loan at Politehnica Iași)
7	MF	ESP	Juan Cámara (on loan from (Poland) Jagiellonia Białystok)
8	MF	ROU	Paul Anton (from (Russia) Krylia Sovetov Samara)
9	FW	SEN	Magaye Gueye (from (Azerbaijan) Qarabağ)
10	FW	ESP	Borja Valle (from (Spain) Deportivo La Coruña)
12	GK	ROU	Mihai Eșanu (loan return from Farul Constanța)
17	FW	SVK	Adam Nemec (from (Cyprus) Pafos)
18	DF	ESP	Isma López (from (Spain) Tenerife)
21	DF	VEN	Alexander González (from (Spain) Mirandés)
24	DF	ROU	Ekrem Oltay (loan return from Afumați)
29	FW	ROU	Cătălin Măgureanu (loan return from Afumați)
30	DF	ROU	Florin Bejan (loan return from Academica Clinceni)
32	MF	ROU	Geani Crețu (loan return from Rapid București)
33	GK	ESP	René Román (from (Spain) Almería, previously on loan at (Spain) Ponferradina)
35	DF	SEN	Abdoulaye Ba (from (Spain) Rayo Vallecano, previously on loan at (Spain) Deportivo La Coruña)
55	MF	POL	Janusz Gol (from (Poland) Cracovia)
75	MF	ESP	Aleix García (from (England) Manchester City, previously on loan at (Belgium) Mouscron)
77	MF	ROU	Vlad Achim (from Viitorul Constanța)
96	MF	ROU	Alin Lazăr (loan return from Focșani)

Out:

No.	Pos.	Nation	Player
2	DF	ROU	Szabolcs Kilyén (loan return to Viitorul Constanța, later signed by (Hungary) Vasas)
4	MF	ROU	Ioan Filip (to Universitatea Cluj)
7	DF	SVK	Lukáš Skovajsa (to (Czech Republic) Dynamo České Budějovice)
8	MF	ROU	Valentin Lazăr (to (Qatar) Al-Shahania)
12	GK	ROU	Ștefan Fara (on loan to Farul Constanța)
13	DF	ROU	Dan Tălmaciu (on loan to Politehnica Iași)
16	DF	ROU	Mihai Popescu (to (Scotland) Heart of Midlothian)
17	MF	MLI	Mamoutou N'Diaye (to Free agent)
18	FW	SRB	Slavko Perović (to Free agent)
19	FW	ROU	Daniel Popa (on loan to Chindia Târgoviște)
24	MF	CRO	Filip Mrzljak (to Free agent)
26	DF	SVK	Kristián Koštrna (to Free agent)
35	GK	ROU	Cătălin Straton (to FCSB)
37	FW	ROU	Mihai Neicuțescu (on loan to Chindia Târgoviște)
43	FW	ITA	Mattia Montini (to Astra Giurgiu)
93	GK	ITA	Riccardo Piscitelli (to (Portugal) CD Nacional)
—	MF	ROU	Liviu Gheorghe (on loan to Axiopolis Cernavodă, previously on loan at Înainte Modelu)

=== FCSB ===
In:

No.	Pos.	Nation	Player
1	GK	ROU	Cătălin Straton (from Dinamo București)
5	MF	ROU	Gabriel Simion (loan return from Astra Giurgiu)
6	DF	ROU	Marius Briceag (from Universitatea Craiova)
9	FW	ROU	Sergiu Buș (from Gaz Metan Mediaș)
21	FW	ROU	Alexandru Buziuc (from Academica Clinceni)
22	FW	ROU	Cristian Dumitru (loan return from Academica Clinceni, previously on loan)
24	FW	ROU	Robert Ion (loan return from Academica Clinceni)
32	GK	ROU	Ștefan Târnovanu (loan return from Politehnica Iași)
37	MF	ROU	Octavian Popescu (loan return from Turris Turnu Măgurele, previously on loan)
38	MF	ROU	Laurențiu Ardelean (loan return from Farul Constanța)
40	DF	ROU	Ștefan Cană (loan return from Farul Constanța)
44	DF	ROU	Gabriel Enache (from (Kazakhstan) Kyzylzhar)
89	MF	ROU	Adrian Șut (loan return from Academica Clinceni)
—	DF	ROU	Sorin Șerban (loan return from Politehnica Iași)

Out:

No.	Pos.	Nation	Player
9	FW	FRA	Harlem Gnohere (to (Belgium) Mouscron)
12	GK	ROU	Răzvan Ducan (on loan to Turris Turnu Măgurele, previously on loan at Argeș Pitești)
15	DF	SRB	Marko Momčilović (to (Serbia) Radnički Niš)
15	MF	POR	David Caiado (loan return to Hermannstadt, previously on loan)
16	DF	SRB	Bogdan Planić (to (Israel) Maccabi Haifa)
19	FW	ROU	Adrian Petre (on loan to (Italy) Cosenza)
22	FW	SUI	Goran Karanović (loan return to Hermannstadt, previously on loan)
30	MF	ROU	Ovidiu Horșia (on loan to Gaz Metan Mediaș, previously on loan at Politehnica Iași)
34	GK	ROU	Cristian Bălgrădean (to CFR Cluj)
70	DF	ROU	Claudiu Belu (to Hermannstadt, previously on loan at Voluntari)
88	MF	ROU	Adrian Popa (loan return to (England) Reading, later signed by Voluntari)
92	FW	ROU	Romeo Niță (on loan to Turris Turnu Măgurele)
—	MF	BRA	William De Amorim (to (Turkey) Altay, previously on loan at (Greece) Xanthi)
—	MF	ROU	Ianis Stoica (on loan to Slatina, previously on loan at Metaloglobus București)

=== Gaz Metan Mediaș ===
In:

No.	Pos.	Nation	Player
3	DF	BRA	Yuri Matias (from (Iran) Tractor)
5	DF	CZE	Ondřej Bačo (from (Czech Republic) Fastav Zlín)
8	MF	GNB	Francisco Júnior (from (Israel) Hapoel Haifa)
9	FW	ROU	Luis Nițu (from Universitatea Craiova)
13	MF	ROU	Ronaldo Deaconu (from Sepsi Sfântu Gheorghe)
19	FW	CZE	Tomáš Smola (from (Czech Republic) Baník Ostrava)
20	MF	CGO	Yves Pambou (from (France) Grenoble)
21	DF	ROU	Mihai Butean (on loan from CFR Cluj, previously on loan)
22	MF	ROU	Ovidiu Horșia (on loan from FCSB, previously on loan at Politehnica Iași)
23	DF	ROU	Bogdan Jica (loan return from Dunărea Călărași)
26	FW	ROU	Gabriel Plumbuitu (from Daco-Getica București)
29	FW	POR	Zé Manuel (from (Portugal) Santa Clara)
31	GK	ROU	Alexandru Buzbuchi (from Viitorul Constanța)
33	DF	ROU	Răzvan Horj (from CFR Cluj, previously on loan at Universitatea Cluj)
70	FW	POR	Idrisa Sambú (from (Russia) Spartak Moscow)
77	MF	NED	Moussa Sanoh (loan return from Voluntari)
91	FW	POR	Ricardo Valente (from (Portugal) Tondela)
92	MF	HAI	Bryan Alceus (from (France) Paris, previously on loan at (France) Bastia-Borgo)

Out:

No.	Pos.	Nation	Player
4	DF	ROU	Răzvan Popa (to Politehnica Iași)
5	DF	DEN	Thomas Juel-Nielsen (to Free agent)
8	MF	FRA	Mickaël Diakota (to Free agent)
9	FW	ROU	Sergiu Buș (to FCSB)
10	FW	ROU	Ioan Hora (to UTA Arad)
11	FW	CPV	Ely Fernandes (to Viitorul Constanța)
13	DF	ROU	Marian Pleașcă (to UTA Arad)
17	MF	GUI	Boubacar Fofana (to Sepsi Sfântu Gheorghe)
22	DF	CAF	Fernander Kassaï (to Free agent, previously signed from Free agent)
23	DF	ROU	Marius Constantin (to Universitatea Craiova)
33	GK	POR	Ricardo Batista (to (Portugal) Casa Pia)
67	MF	ROU	Neluț Roșu (to UTA Arad)
80	MF	ROU	Stephan Drăghici (loan return to Universitatea Craiova, later on loan to Argeș Pitești)

=== Hermannstadt ===
In:

No.	Pos.	Nation	Player
8	MF	GHA	Baba Alhassan (from (Spain) Real Valladolid)
10	MF	POR	David Caiado (loan return from FCSB, previously on loan)
16	DF	ROU	Luca Florică (from (France) Amiens)
18	DF	ROU	Paul Oșan (loan return from Minaur Baia Mare)
21	MF	ESP	David Mayoral (on loan from (Spain) Cádiz)
26	MF	GUI	Edson Pires (from (Portugal) Aljustrelense)
27	DF	ROU	Adrian Scarlatache (from (Azerbaijan) Zira)
44	DF	ESP	Ángel Bastos (from (Spain) Extremadura)
70	DF	ROU	Claudiu Belu (from FCSB, previously on loan at Voluntari)
90	MF	GHA	Bright Addae (from (Italy) Juve Stabia)
91	FW	POR	Fábio Fortes (from (Portugal) Arouca)
92	FW	NED	Stanley Elbers (from (Netherlands) PEC Zwolle, previously on loan at (Netherlands) RKC Waalwijk)
93	MF	HAI	Soni Mustivar (from (Azerbaijan) Neftçi)
99	FW	SUI	Goran Karanović (loan return from FCSB, previously signed from Sepsi Sfântu Gheorghe)

Out:

No.	Pos.	Nation	Player
2	DF	ESP	Biel Company (to Free agent)
3	DF	ROU	Srdjan Luchin (to Universitatea Cluj)
7	MF	ROU	Petrișor Petrescu (to Academica Clinceni)
8	MF	ROU	Andrei Cordea (loan return to (Italy) Novara, later signed by Academica Clinceni)
9	FW	ROU	Adrian Bălan (to Rapid București)
14	MF	POR	Afonso Taira (to (Portugal) Belenenses)
17	MF	ROU	Daniel Tătar (to Viitorul Șelimbăr)
22	GK	POR	Emanuel Novo (to (Portugal) Penafiel)
23	DF	ROU	Alin Dobrosavlevici (to Viitorul Constanța)
24	DF	ROU	Sorin Bușu (to Politehnica Iași)
27	FW	CRO	Gabriel Debeljuh (to CFR Cluj)
28	FW	POR	Yazalde (to Free agent)
29	DF	CPV	Tiago Almeida (to (Portugal) Feirense)
44	MF	ROU	Lucian Dumitriu (to Academica Clinceni)
98	FW	CRO	Stjepan Plazonja (on loan to ASU Politehnica Timișoara, previously on loan at Viitorul Șelimbăr)

=== Politehnica Iași ===
In:

No.	Pos.	Nation	Player
3	DF	GRE	Nikos Baxevanos (on loan from Botoșani)
6	MF	ALB	Donaldo Açka (from (Albania) Luftëtari)
9	FW	BIH	Dženan Zajmović (from (Bosnia and Herzegovina) Željezničar)
11	MF	BEL	Floriano Vanzo (from (Belgium) Virton)
16	GK	HUN	Levente Bősz (from (Hungary) Vasas)
17	MF	GHA	Joseph Mensah (from (Israel) Bnei Yehuda)
22	DF	ROU	Sorin Bușu (from Hermannstadt)
29	MF	ROU	Antonio Stan (from Free agent)
42	DF	ROU	Dan Tălmaciu (on loan from Dinamo București)
90	MF	ROU	Andreias Calcan (from (Hungary) Újpest)
95	GK	MDA	Ianoș Brînză (on loan from Botoșani)
—	DF	ROU	Răzvan Popa (from Gaz Metan Mediaș)

Out:

No.	Pos.	Nation	Player
3	DF	ROU	Andrei Radu (loan return to CFR Cluj, later signed by Dinamo București)
5	DF	ROU	Narcis Bădic (to Free agent)
9	FW	CAF	Habib Habibou (to Free agent)
12	GK	MDA	Denis Rusu (to Viitorul Târgu Jiu)
13	FW	ROU	Alexandru Zaharia (on loan to Aerostar Bacău)
14	DF	ROU	Ștefan Rusu (on loan to Hușana Huși, previously on loan at Ozana Târgu Neamț)
16	GK	ITA	Alessandro Caparco (Retired)
17	DF	ROU	Sorin Șerban (loan return to FCSB)
22	MF	ROU	Răzvan Grădinaru (to Voluntari)
28	DF	LTU	Linas Klimavičius (to (Lithuania) Sūduva)
28	DF	ROU	Daniel Ciobanu (to CSM Reșița, previously signed from Pandurii Târgu Jiu)
29	MF	NGA	Michael Omoh (to (Israel) Hapoel Kfar Saba)
30	MF	ROU	Ovidiu Horșia (loan return to FCSB, later on loan to Gaz Metan Mediaș)
30	DF	ROU	Bogdan Balint (to Free agent, previously on loan at Aerostar Bacău)
42	FW	NED	Kevin Luckassen (to Viitorul Constanța)
90	MF	ROU	Aleksandru Longher (to Academica Clinceni)
95	GK	ROU	Ștefan Târnovanu (loan return to FCSB)
97	DF	MLI	Bourama Fomba (loan return to Ceahlăul Piatra Neamț, later signed by Chindia Târgoviște)
—	DF	FRA	Abdelaye Diakité (to FC U Craiova)
—	FW	ROU	Mario Pipoș (on loan to Știința Miroslava, previously on loan at Foresta Suceava)

=== Sepsi Sfântu Gheorghe ===
In:

No.	Pos.	Nation	Player
2	DF	GRE	Panagiotis Deligiannidis (from (Greece) OFI)
3	DF	ROU	Bogdan Mitrea (from (Slovakia) Spartak Trnava)
12	GK	ESP	Jesús Fernández (from CFR Cluj, previously on loan at (Greece) Panetolikos)
13	FW	SWE	Admir Bajrovic (from (Greece) Panetolikos)
14	MF	ROU	Vlad Mitrea (from (Belgium) Lokeren)
17	MF	GUI	Boubacar Fofana (from Gaz Metan Mediaș)
19	MF	FRA	Bryan Nouvier (from (Poland) Raków Częstochowa)
25	MF	AUT	Aleksa Markovic (from (Germany) Rot-Weiß Oberhausen)
27	MF	ROU	Claudiu Petrila (on loan from CFR Cluj)
30	MF	ROU	Florin Purece (from (Poland) Termalica Nieciecza)
77	MF	CRO	Adnan Aganović (from (Cyprus) AEL Limassol)
90	FW	ROU	Cătălin Golofca (on loan from CFR Cluj)

Out:

No.	Pos.	Nation	Player
3	DF	CRO	Hrvoje Barišić (to (Bosnia and Herzegovina) Tuzla City)
6	DF	ROU	Daniel Celea (to (Poland) ŁKS Łódź)
13	MF	ROU	Ronaldo Deaconu (to Gaz Metan Mediaș)
14	FW	ARG	Tomás Díaz (on loan to Chindia Târgoviște)
17	MF	ROU	Călin Popescu (to UTA Arad)
19	FW	CMR	Edgar Salli (to (Cyprus) Olympiakos Nicosia)
25	FW	SUI	Goran Karanović (to Hermannstadt)
27	MF	ROU	Nicolae Carnat (to CFR Cluj)
77	MF	BUL	Stefan Velev (to (Bulgaria) Cherno More)
95	GK	ROU	Béla Fejér (on loan to (Hungary) Nyíregyháza Spartacus)
—	MF	NGA	Jacob Adebanjo (to Free agent)
—	MF	SDN	Yasin Hamed (to (Hungary) Nyíregyháza Spartacus, previously on loan at Miercurea Ciuc)

=== Universitatea Craiova ===
In:

No.	Pos.	Nation	Player
2	DF	ROU	Paul Papp (from Sivasspor)
6	MF	ROU	Vladimir Screciu (from Genk, previously on loan at Lommel)
14	FW	GER	Reagy Ofosu (from Botoșani)
20	FW	ROU	Alexandru Tudorie (on loan from (Russia) Arsenal Tula, previously on loan at Voluntari)
23	DF	ROU	Marius Constantin (from Gaz Metan Mediaș)
28	FW	ROU	George Cîmpanu (from Botoșani)
29	MF	ROU	Ovidiu Bic (loan return from Chindia Târgoviște)
30	FW	CRO	Ivan Mamut (from Inter Zaprešić)
32	FW	ROU	Andrei Burlacu (loan return from Concordia Chiajna)
33	MF	ROU	Mihai Căpățînă (from Voluntari)

Out:

No.	Pos.	Nation	Player
2	DF	POR	Tiago Ferreira (to (Hungary) MTK Budapest)
3	DF	ROU	Marius Briceag (to FCSB)
4	DF	FRA	Claude Dielna (to Free agent)
14	MF	ALB	Kamer Qaka (to (Norway) Kongsvinger)
15	DF	SRB	Uroš Ćosić (to (Belarus) Shakhtyor Soligorsk)
20	MF	BRA	Gustavo (on loan to (United Arab Emirates) Ajman)
24	DF	ROU	Florin Gardoș (to Academica Clinceni)
27	DF	SUI	Ivan Martić (to (Switzerland) Sion)
28	FW	ROU	Valentin Mihăilă (to (Italy) Parma)
30	DF	ROU	Alexandru Mățel (to Free agent)
31	MF	ROU	Stephan Drăghici (on loan to Argeș Pitești, previously on loan at Gaz Metan Mediaș)
37	FW	ROU	Alexandru Popescu (on loan to ASU Politehnica Timișoara)
38	FW	ROU	Luis Nițu (to Gaz Metan Mediaș)
99	FW	POR	Carlos Fortes (to (Portugal) Vilafranquense, previously on loan at (Morocco) Ittihad Tanger)
—	MF	PAR	César Meza Colli (to Free agent, previously on loan at (Azerbaijan) Keşla)
—	MF	ROU	Marian Șerban (on loan to Academica Clinceni, previously on loan at Mioveni)

=== UTA Arad ===
In:

No.	Pos.	Nation	Player
4	DF	ROU	Alexandru Benga (from Chindia Târgoviște)
6	DF	ROU	Cristian Albu (on loan from Concordia Chiajna, previously on loan at Academica Clinceni)
15	MF	ROU	Călin Popescu (from Sepsi Sfântu Gheorghe)
21	DF	BRA	Erico (from (Azerbaijan) Sabail)
23	MF	ROU	Neluț Roșu (from Gaz Metan Mediaș)
25	DF	ROU	Marian Pleașcă (from Gaz Metan Mediaș)
29	MF	CRO	Mihovil Klapan (from (Bulgaria) Lokomotiv Plovdiv)
31	GK	ROU	Horațiu Moldovan (from Ripensia Timișoara)
41	MF	ROU	Dragoș Tescan (on loan from Turris Turnu Măgurele)
77	FW	ROU	Vlad Morar (from Voluntari)
86	MF	ROU	Denis Rusu (on loan from Șoimii Lipova)
88	FW	ROU	Ioan Hora (from Gaz Metan Mediaș)

Out:

No.	Pos.	Nation	Player
1	GK	ROU	Raul Opric (on loan to CSO Cugir)
3	DF	ROU	Andrei Rus (loan return to Petrolul Ploiești)
3	DF	ROU	Răzvan Ivan (on loan to Gloria LT Cermei, previously on loan at Unirea Alba Iulia)
5	MF	CIV	Stephan Coulibaly (to Ripensia Timișoara)
6	MF	ROU	Cristian Pușcaș (to Turris Turnu Măgurele)
21	MF	ESP	Soufiane Jebari (to Miercurea Ciuc)
22	MF	ROU	Cătălin Vulturar (to (Italy) Lecce)
23	DF	ROU	Bogdan Stancu (to Free agent)
27	MF	ROU	Romario Moise (loan return to Astra Giurgiu)
30	DF	ROU	Radu Crișan (loan return to Astra Giurgiu, later on loan to Rapid București)
75	MF	ROU	Andrei Gavrilă (on loan to Șoimii Lipova)
77	MF	ROU	Alexandru Ciucur (to Dunărea Călărași)

=== Viitorul Constanța ===
In:

No.	Pos.	Nation	Player
11	FW	ESP	Víctor Fernández (from (England) Newcastle U23)
12	GK	ROU	Valentin Cojocaru (loan return from Voluntari)
16	DF	ESP	Ángel Martínez (from (Greece) Asteras Tripolis)
19	DF	ROU	Romario Benzar (on loan from (Italy) Lecce, previously on loan at (Italy) Perugia)
20	MF	ROU	Alexandru Mățan (loan return from Voluntari)
21	DF	ROU	Alin Dobrosavlevici (from Hermannstadt)
27	FW	CPV	Ely Fernandes (from Gaz Metan Mediaș)
28	MF	ESP	Jon Gaztañaga (from (Cyprus) AEL Limassol)
39	MF	ROU	Adrian Stoian (from (Italy) Livorno)
42	FW	NED	Kevin Luckassen (from Politehnica Iași)
66	MF	ESP	Josemi Castañeda (from (Spain) Las Palmas)

Out:

No.	Pos.	Nation	Player
3	DF	ROU	Tiberiu Căpușă (on loan to Chindia Târgoviște)
7	FW	BRA	Rivaldinho (to (Poland) Cracovia)
9	FW	CMR	Jacques Zoua (to (Cameroon) Coton Sport)
9	FW	ROU	Louis Munteanu (to (Italy) Fiorentina)
19	MF	ROU	Cosmin Bîrnoi (to Farul Constanța)
20	MF	FRA	Malcom Edjouma (to (Belgium) Roeselare)
21	DF	ROU	Paul Iacob (on loan to Chindia Târgoviște)
22	DF	ROU	Cristian Ganea (loan return to (Spain) Athletic Bilbao, later signed by (Greece) Aris)
27	MF	ROU	Marco Dulca (on loan to Chindia Târgoviște)
31	GK	ROU	Alexandru Buzbuchi (to Gaz Metan Mediaș)
31	GK	ROU	Cosmin Dur-Bozoancă (on loan to Farul Constanța, previously on loan at Universitatea Cluj)
77	MF	ROU	Vlad Achim (to Dinamo București)
—	DF	ROU	Szabolcs Kilyén (to (Hungary) Vasas, previously on loan at Dinamo București)
—	MF	ROU	Răzvan Matiș (on loan to Petrolul Ploiești, previously on loan at Argeș Pitești)
—	MF	ROU	Alexandru Iulian Stoica (to Farul Constanța, previously on loan)
—	MF	ROU	Andrei Tîrcoveanu (to Botoșani, previously on loan at Concordia Chiajna)

=== Voluntari ===
In:

No.	Pos.	Nation	Player
1	GK	ESP	Marcos Lavín (from (Spain) Getafe)
7	MF	ROU	Răzvan Grădinaru (from Politehnica Iași)
9	FW	ESP	Jefté Betancor (from (Austria) SV Ried)
11	MF	BRA	Anderson (from Free agent)
14	MF	POR	Marcelo Lopes (from (Netherlands) Eindhoven)
17	MF	ROU	Sebastian Mailat (on loan from CFR Cluj, previously on loan at Universitatea Cluj)
29	DF	FRA	Grégoire Puel (from Free agent)
30	FW	ROU	Alexandru Stoica (loan return from Farul Constanța)
33	GK	ROU	Mihai Cotolan (from Pandurii Târgu Jiu)
88	MF	ROU	Adrian Popa (from (England) Reading, previously on loan at FCSB)

Out:

No.	Pos.	Nation	Player
1	GK	BUL	Bozhidar Mitrev (to (Bulgaria) Septemvri Sofia)
4	DF	ROU	Mircea Leasă (to Rapid București)
6	DF	ROU	Alex Pașcanu (loan return to CFR Cluj, later on loan to (Spain) Ponferradina)
7	FW	ROU	Vlad Morar (to UTA Arad)
10	MF	ROU	Alexandru Mățan (loan return to Viitorul Constanța)
11	MF	ROU	Mihai Căpățînă (to Universitatea Craiova)
15	DF	ROU	Claudiu Belu (loan return to FCSB, later signed by Hermannstadt)
20	FW	ROU	Cătălin Țîră (to Rapid București)
25	MF	ARG	Nicolás Gorobsov (loan return to Concordia Chiajna, later signed by (Lithuania) Sūduva)
30	FW	ROU	Alexandru Tudorie (loan return to (Russia) Arsenal Tula, later on loan to Universitatea Craiova)
70	FW	MKD	Marko Simonovski (to Free agent)
77	MF	NED	Moussa Sanoh (loan return to Gaz Metan Mediaș)
89	DF	SVN	Andraž Struna (to (Italy) Triestina)
93	MF	FRA	Aïssa Laïdouni (to (Hungary) Ferencváros)
95	GK	ROU	Valentin Cojocaru (loan return to Viitorul Constanța)
97	FW	ROU	Daniel Benzar (to Rapid București)

== Liga II ==
=== Aerostar Bacău ===
In:

No.	Pos.	Nation	Player
7	DF	ROU	Darius Mureșan (on loan from Viitorul Constanța)
14	DF	BFA	François Yabré (from Viitorul Târgu Jiu)
17	MF	ROU	Bogdan Oteliță (on loan from Ceahlăul Piatra Neamț)
24	MF	ROU	Ionuț Belciu (from Moinești)
32	DF	ROU	Andrei Alecsandru (from Bucovina Rădăuți)
44	GK	ROU	Iulian Anca-Trip (from Viitorul Târgu Jiu)
70	FW	ROU	Dorin Burlacu (from Hunedoara)
93	FW	ROU	Alexandru Zaharia (on loan from Politehnica Iași)
—	GK	ROU	Alexandru Barna (on loan from Ceahlăul Piatra Neamț)
—	MF	ROU	Vlad Mihalcea (from Universitatea Cluj)

Out:

No.	Pos.	Nation	Player
6	MF	ROU	Stejărel Vișinar (to Foresta Suceava)
8	MF	ROU	Cristian Copoț-Barb (to Free agent)
16	DF	ROU	Ionuț Mihălăchioaie (to Free agent)
17	FW	ROU	Cosmin Nemțanu (to Free agent)
24	DF	ROU	Vasile Chirilescu (to Bucovina Rădăuți)
32	FW	ROU	Răzvan Gorovei (to Focșani)
70	MF	ROU	Denis Botezatu (to Free agent)
89	GK	ROU	Ovidiu Mocanu (to Free agent)
93	DF	ROU	Bogdan Balint (loan return to Politehnica Iași)

=== ASU Politehnica Timișoara ===
In:

No.	Pos.	Nation	Player
6	MF	ROU	Rareș Toader (on loan from FCSB II)
11	FW	ROU	Alexandru Popescu (on loan from Universitatea Craiova)
16	MF	ROU	Doru Andrei (from Comprest GIM București)
17	FW	CRO	Stjepan Plazonja (on loan from Hermannstadt, previously on loan at Viitorul Șelimbăr)
18	DF	ROU	Claudiu Pamfile (from Minaur Baia Mare)
20	MF	ROU	Petre Ivanovici (from Concordia Chiajna)
—	GK	ROU	Otto Hindrich (on loan from CFR Cluj)

Out:

No.	Pos.	Nation	Player
1	GK	ROU	Rareș Murariu (on loan to CFR Cluj)
6	MF	MDA	Cristian Dros (to (Latvia) Spartaks Jūrmala)
11	MF	ROU	Dragoș Săulescu (to Filiași)
15	MF	ROU	Nicolae Șofran (loan return to Ghiroda)
17	FW	ROU	Alexandru Pop (to Rapid București)
20	DF	ROU	Alexandru Cherecheș (to Concordia Chiajna)
22	DF	ROU	Radu Motreanu (loan return to ACS Poli Timișoara)
23	GK	ROU	Mario Contra (loan return to ACS Poli Timișoara, later signed by Botoșani)
30	GK	ROU	Alexandru Borbei (to (Italy) Lecce)
—	MF	ROU	Adrian Lazăr (on loan to CA Oradea, previously on loan at Ghiroda)
—	FW	MDA	Artiom Zabun (to Free agent, previously on loan at Focșani)

=== Comuna Recea ===
In:

No.	Pos.	Nation	Player
4	DF	ROU	Florin Cordoș (from Minaur Baia Mare)
6	MF	FRA	Rassambeck Akhmatov (from (United States) Sporting Kansas City II)
7	DF	ROU	Rareș Ispas (on loan from CFR Cluj, previously on loan at CSM Reșița)
9	FW	ROU	Marius Coman (from Universitatea Cluj)
14	MF	ROU	Adrian Micaș (from Universitatea Cluj, previously on loan)
17	FW	COD	Arsène Luboya (from CSM Reșița)
24	DF	ROU	Denis Lihet (from Minaur Baia Mare)
27	DF	ROU	Marius Potcoavă (from Universitatea Cluj, previously on loan)
—	FW	ROU	Alexandru Oltean (from Universitatea Cluj, previously on loan)

Out:

No.	Pos.	Nation	Player
4	DF	ROU	Bogdan Pașca (to Progresul Șomcuta Mare)
6	DF	ROU	Claudiu Maftei (to Comuna Recea)
8	MF	ROU	Cosmin Berinde (to Free agent)
9	FW	ROU	Arthur Teuț (to Free agent)
27	MF	ROU	Norbert János (to Miercurea Ciuc)
—	MF	ROU	Raini Bandula (to Progresul Șomcuta Mare)

=== Concordia Chiajna ===
In:

No.	Pos.	Nation	Player
9	MF	ROU	Ciprian Biceanu (from Astra Giurgiu)
10	FW	ALB	Azdren Llullaku (from (Belarus) Shakhtyor Soligorsk)
11	MF	ROU	Baudouin Kanda (from Farul Constanța)
13	DF	ROU	Cătălin Alexe (from Mioveni)
14	FW	ROU	Andrei Hergheligiu (from Mioveni)
20	FW	FRA	Philippe Nsiah (from (Vietnam) Đà Nẵng)
27	DF	ROU	Alexandru Cherecheș (from ASU Politehnica Timișoara)
28	FW	ROU	Sergiu Arnăutu (from Petrolul Ploiești)
33	GK	ROU	Daniel Isvoranu (loan return from Mostiștea Ulmu)
—	DF	ROU	Daniel Bonteanu (loan return from Mostiștea Ulmu)
—	GK	FRA	Thomas Chesneau (from Free agent)
—	MF	ROU	Daniel Cîrjan (from Free agent)
—	MF	ROU	Bogdan Piper (from Minaur Baia Mare)

Out:

No.	Pos.	Nation	Player
7	MF	ROU	Petre Ivanovici (to ASU Politehnica Timișoara)
9	FW	MAR	Bilal Bari (to (Bulgaria) Montana)
11	FW	BUL	Ventsislav Hristov (to (Bulgaria) Slavia Sofia)
18	MF	ROU	Andrei Tîrcoveanu (loan return to Viitorul Constanța, later signed by Botoșani)
19	FW	ROU	Andrei Burlacu (loan return to Universitatea Craiova)
21	MF	ROU	Dan Bucșa (to Victoria Cluj)
22	DF	CPV	Nivaldo (to (Portugal) Anadia)
27	MF	ROU	Ciprian Gliga (loan return to Academica Clinceni)
33	GK	ROU	Alexandru Greab (to Argeș Pitești)
—	GK	ROU	Dimitri Ioniță (on loan to Turris Turnu Măgurele)
—	DF	ROU	Cristian Albu (on loan to UTA Arad, previously on loan at Academica Clinceni)
—	MF	ARG	Nicolás Gorobsov (to (Lithuania) Sūduva, previously on loan at Voluntari)

=== CSM Reșița ===
In:

No.	Pos.	Nation	Player
2	DF	ROU	Caius Lungu (from Ripensia Timișoara)
15	MF	ROU	Robert Boboc (on loan from Astra Giurgiu, previously on loan at Dunărea Călărași)
19	MF	ROU	Ovidiu Rașoveanu (from Argeș Pitești)
20	FW	ROU	Vlad Chera (on loan from Viitorul Constanța, previously on loan at Ripensia Timișoara)
22	MF	ROU	Nini Popescu (from Argeș Pitești)
29	DF	ROU	Denis Brînzan (from Argeș Pitești)
30	FW	LTU	Deivydas Matulevicius (from (Northern Ireland) Glentoran)
—	DF	ROU	Daniel Ciobanu (from Politehnica Iași)

Out:

No.	Pos.	Nation	Player
3	DF	ROU	Milorad Banac (to Free agent)
10	FW	ROU	Gabriel Dodoi (loan return to Rapid București, later signed by Pandurii Târgu Jiu)
15	FW	COD	Arsène Luboya (to Comuna Recea)
16	MF	ROU	Teodor Caragea (to Dunărea Călărași)
19	DF	FRA	Yvan Erichot (to Free agent)
20	DF	ROU	Rareș Ispas (loan return to CFR Cluj, later on loan to Comuna Recea)
22	MF	ROU	Fernando Dobre (loan return to Dan Chilom)
26	DF	ROU	Laurențiu Rus (to Universitatea Cluj)
28	MF	ROU	Călin Cristea (to FC U Craiova)
30	MF	ROU	Mădălin Calu (loan return to SCM Gloria Buzău, later signed by Dunărea Călărași)

=== Dunărea Călărași ===
In:

No.	Pos.	Nation	Player
2	FW	ROU	Andrei Mihăiescu (from CSA Steaua București)
4	MF	ROU	Adrian Bedea (from Minaur Baia Mare)
5	MF	ROU	Robert Candrea (from SCM Gloria Buzău)
6	DF	POL	Kamil Wiktorski (from (Poland) Chojniczanka Chojnice)
8	FW	ROU	Marius Fotescu (from Axiopolis Cernavodă)
11	MF	AUT	Sandro Djurić (from Rapid București)
15	MF	ROU	Codruț Anghel (from Dacia Unirea Brăila)
19	FW	ROU	Valentin Alexandru (from Rapid București)
21	MF	ROU	Mădălin Calu (from SCM Gloria Buzău, previously on loan at CSM Reșița)
26	FW	ROU	Cristian Bud (from Minaur Baia Mare)
27	MF	ROU	Teodor Caragea (from CSM Reșița)
70	MF	ROU	Alexandru Ciucur (from UTA Arad)
—	GK	ROU	Mădălin Guță (loan return from Înainte Modelu)
—	MF	ROU	Costin Petre (loan return from Înainte Modelu)
—	DF	ROU	Sorin Sava (from Free agent)
—	MF	MAR	Saifeddine Alami (from Rapid București)

Out:

No.	Pos.	Nation	Player
2	DF	ROU	Alexandru Sabangeanu (loan return to Viitorul Constanța)
5	DF	ROU	Bogdan Jica (loan return to Gaz Metan Mediaș)
6	DF	SUI	Ahmet Özcan (to Free agent)
8	MF	ROU	Robert Boboc (loan return to Astra Giurgiu, later signed by CSM Reșița)
10	MF	ROU	Georgian Honciu (to Argeș Pitești)
11	FW	JOR	Tha'er Bawab (to Free agent)
15	MF	ROU	Claudiu Vereș (loan return to Sepsi Sfântu Gheorghe)
17	FW	SEN	Mediop Ndiaye (to Argeș Pitești)
18	FW	ROU	Gabriel Toma (loan return to Rapid București)
27	DF	SEN	Gaston Mendy (to Free agent)
33	GK	MDA	Nicolae Calancea (to (Moldova) Sfântul Gheorghe Suruceni)
73	DF	GRE	Konstantinos Rougalas (to Free agent)
90	FW	ROU	Bogdan Rusu (to Mioveni)
96	MF	FRA	Madikaba Doumbia (to Free agent)

=== Farul Constanța ===
In:

No.	Pos.	Nation	Player
1	GK	MDA	Sebastian Agachi (on loan from Viitorul Constanța, previously on loan at Argeș Pitești)
7	MF	ROU	Florin Bălan (on loan from Voluntari II)
9	FW	ROU	Andrei Banyoi (from Șoimii Lipova)
10	MF	ROU	Alexandru Iulian Stoica (from Viitorul Constanța, previously on loan)
14	MF	ROU	Aurel Pirciu (on loan from FCSB II)
17	FW	ROU	Simon Măzărache (from Mioveni)
21	GK	ROU	Ștefan Fara (on loan from Dinamo București)
77	MF	ROU	Cosmin Bîrnoi (from Viitorul Constanța)
—	GK	ROU	Cosmin Dur-Bozoancă (on loan from Viitorul Constanța, previously on loan at Universitatea Cluj)
—	DF	ROU	Robert Băjan (from Rapid București)

Out:

No.	Pos.	Nation	Player
1	GK	ROU	Vlad Muțiu (to Universitatea Cluj)
4	DF	ROU	Ștefan Cană (loan return to FCSB)
7	MF	ROU	Baudouin Kanda (to Concordia Chiajna)
9	MF	ROU	Alexandru Ionuț Stoica (loan return to Voluntari)
14	FW	ROU	Mădălin Martin (to Axiopolis Cernavodă)
17	MF	ROU	Daniel Toma (loan return to FCSB II, later on loan to Mioveni)
20	MF	ROU	Laurențiu Ardelean (loan return to FCSB)
21	GK	ROU	Mihai Eșanu (loan return to Dinamo București)
33	MF	ROU	Marius Chindriș (to Mioveni, previously signed from Viitorul Șelimbăr)
45	FW	ROU	Dimciu Halep (loan return to Viitorul Constanța, later signed by FCSB II)
77	MF	ROU	Alexandru Nicola (loan return to FCSB II, later signed by Turris Turnu Măgurele)
88	MF	MKD	Mihailo Mitrov (loan return to FCSB II, later signed by (North Macedonia) Borec)

=== FC U Craiova ===
In:

No.	Pos.	Nation	Player
3	DF	ITA	Lorenzo Paramatti (from (Italy) Rimini)
5	DF	BEL	Jérémy Huyghebaert (from (Belgium) Mouscron)
7	FW	ARG	Ignacio Cacheiro (from (Argentina) Chacarita Juniors)
8	MF	ROU	Constantin Albu (from (Netherlands) Jong FC Utrecht)
13	DF	FRA	Bradley Diallo (from Chindia Târgoviște)
18	MF	ROU	Călin Cristea (from CSM Reșița)
19	DF	ROU	Marian Anghelina (from Mioveni)
20	DF	ROU	Alexandru Gîț (from SCM Gloria Buzău)
24	MF	BEL	William Baeten (from (Belgium) Patro Eisden)
31	GK	ROU	Robert Popa (from Flacăra Horezu)
32	GK	ARG	Federico Taborda (from (Slovakia) Senica)
33	FW	ITA	Andrea Compagno (from (San Marino) Tre Fiori)
77	MF	ROU	Valentin Munteanu (from SCM Gloria Buzău)
78	DF	FRA	Abdelaye Diakité (from Politehnica Iași)
99	FW	ROU	Andrei Ciolacu (from (Georgia (country)) Tskhinvali)

Out:

No.	Pos.	Nation	Player
5	DF	ROU	Cornel Suciu (to Free agent)
14	MF	ROU	Daniel Rogoveanu (to Slatina)
18	DF	ROU	Ovidiu Dănănae (Retired)
20	FW	ROU	Claudiu Dragu (to Free agent)
21	GK	ROU	Mario Enache (on loan to Filiași)
22	GK	ROU	Claudiu Chindriș (to Free agent)
24	MF	ROU	Ionuț Tănase (to Free agent)
28	DF	ROU	Constantin Grecu (to Pandurii Târgu Jiu)
29	MF	ROU	Vlad Boția (to Corona Brașov)
99	FW	ROU	Kevin Trabalka (to Șoimii Lipova)
—	DF	ROU	Samuel Luică (to Free agent, previously on loan at Filiași)
—	DF	CIV	Olivier N'Zi (to Free agent)
—	MF	ROU	Robert Riza (to Astra Giurgiu)

=== Metaloglobus București ===
In:

No.	Pos.	Nation	Player

Out:

No.	Pos.	Nation	Player
7	MF	ROU	Ianis Stoica (loan return to FCSB, later on loan to Slatina)
9	MF	ROU	Valentin Ghenovici (to Focșani)
20	DF	ROU	Radu Zamfir (loan return to FCSB II)
23	MF	ROU	Alexandru Duminică (loan return to Astra II)
27	MF	ROU	Paulian Banu (loan return to Astra II)
29	DF	ROU	Florin Plămadă (to Botoșani)
97	GK	ROU	Robert Geantă (to Focșani)

=== Miercurea Ciuc ===
In:

No.	Pos.	Nation	Player
1	GK	SVK	Ladislav Rybánsky (from (Hungary) Békéscsaba Előre)
3	DF	ROU	Claudiu Apro (from Ripensia Timișoara)
8	MF	ROU	Rareș Takács (from Universitatea Cluj)
14	MF	ROU	Norbert János (from Comuna Recea)
15	FW	SVK	András Mészáros (from (Slovakia) Sereď)
22	DF	HUN	Dávid Bor (from (Hungary) Paks)
—	FW	ROU	Tamás Becze (loan return from CSM Bacău)
—	MF	ESP	Soufiane Jebari (from UTA Arad)

Out:

No.	Pos.	Nation	Player
3	DF	HUN	Adrián Majzik (to (Hungary) Kazincbarcika)
8	MF	ROU	Szilárd Vereș (to Mioveni)
10	MF	ROU	Carlo Erdei (to (Hungary) Kaposvár)
11	MF	ROU	Szilárd Magyari (to (Hungary) Soroksár)
17	FW	ROU	Barna Bajko (Retired)
23	GK	HUN	Dániel Bordás (on loan to Odorheiu Secuiesc)
29	MF	ROU	Martin Takács (to (Hungary) Mosonmagyaróvár, previously on loan at Odorheiu Secuiesc)
57	FW	ROU	László Hodgyai (to (Hungary) Jászberény, previously on loan at Odorheiu Secuiesc)
—	MF	SUD	Yasin Hamed (loan return to Sepsi Sfântu Gheorghe, later signed by (Hungary) Nyíregyháza Spartacus)
—	GK	HUN	Pál Somogyi (to (Hungary) Tarpa, previously on loan at Odorheiu Secuiesc)
—	DF	ROU	Szabolcs Kovács (to Free agent, previously on loan at Hunedoara)
—	DF	ROU	Zsolt Zsombori (to Free agent, previously on loan at Odorheiu Secuiesc)
—	FW	ENG	Romaric Logon (to SCM Zalău, previously on loan at Odorheiu Secuiesc)

=== Mioveni ===
In:

No.	Pos.	Nation	Player
3	DF	ROU	Fabrizio Constantin (from Unirea Bascov)
7	MF	ROU	Daniel Toma (on loan from FCSB II, previously on loan at Farul Constanța)
8	MF	ROU	Szilárd Vereș (from Miercurea Ciuc)
14	DF	ROU	Alexandru Iacob (from Rapid București)
20	MF	ROU	Laurențiu Marinescu (from Petrolul Ploiești)
21	FW	ROU	Sergiu Negruț (from Turris Turnu Măgurele)
22	GK	ROU	Iustin Popescu (from Chindia Târgoviște)
24	DF	BRA	Guilherme Garutti (from (Brazil) Sertãozinho)
25	FW	ROU	Sebastian Ivan (loan return from Unirea Bascov)
26	DF	ROU	Dorinel Oancea (from Argeș Pitești)
30	MF	ROU	Marius Chindriș (from Farul Constanța)
31	MF	ISR	Eitan Velblum (on loan from (Israel) Bnei Yehuda)
—	FW	ROU	André Cozma (from Argeș Pitești)
—	FW	ROU	Bogdan Rusu (from Dunărea Călărași)

Out:

No.	Pos.	Nation	Player
3	DF	ROU	Robert Ghiță (to Unirea Slobozia)
5	DF	ROU	Raul Hreniuc (loan return to Universitatea Craiova)
6	DF	MDA	Ștefan Efros (to (Moldova) Petrocub Hîncești)
7	FW	ROU	Valentin Balint (to Petrolul Ploiești)
8	MF	ROU	Marian Șerban (loan return to Universitatea Craiova, later on loan to Academica Clinceni)
13	DF	ROU	Cătălin Alexe (to Concordia Chiajna)
14	FW	ROU	Andrei Hergheligiu (to Concordia Chiajna)
19	DF	ROU	Marian Anghelina (to FC U Craiova)
20	FW	ROU	Simon Măzărache (to Farul Constanța)
22	GK	ROU	Flavius Croitoru (to Argeș Pitești)
28	DF	ROU	Dean Beța (to CSA Steaua București)
30	MF	ROU	Raul Costin (to Rapid București)
31	DF	ROU	Eduard Stoica (to Free agent)
33	MF	ROU	Paul Cioargă (to Free agent)
—	MF	ROU	Raul Drugă (to Free agent, previously on loan at Olimpic Cetate Râșnov)

=== Pandurii Târgu Jiu ===
In:

No.	Pos.	Nation	Player
1	GK	ROU	Cătălin Iovicin (from Deta)
5	DF	ROU	Andrei Dobre (from Universitatea II Craiova)
8	MF	BEL	Martin Remacle (from (Belgium) URSL Visé)
9	MF	ROU	Sebastian Velcotă (from Cetate Deva)
10	MF	ROU	Cătălin Vaida (on loan from FCSB II)
11	FW	POL	Rafał Zaborowski (from (Slovakia) Partizán Bardejov)
14	FW	FRA	Steven Goma (from Free agent)
15	MF	GHA	Prince Buaben (from Free agent)
16	MF	COL	Felipe Acosta (from (Spain) Lorca)
17	DF	ROU	Constantin Grecu (from FC U Craiova)
24	DF	BEL	Keimus Bunga (from Free agent)
28	MF	ROU	Andrei Pleșa (from Dacia Unirea Brăila)
—	FW	ROU	Gabriel Dodoi (from Rapid București, previously on loan at CSM Reșița)

Out:

No.	Pos.	Nation	Player
1	GK	ROU	Mihai Cotolan (to Voluntari)
5	DF	ROU	Daniel Ciobanu (to Politehnica Iași)
6	DF	ROU	Nicolae Cotolan (to Free agent)
7	MF	ROU	Patrick Popescu (to Free agent)
10	MF	ROU	Andrei Șendroiu (to Filiași)
11	MF	ROU	Radu Filip (on loan to Gilortul Târgu Cărbunești)
13	MF	JPN	Kazuki Takahashi (to (Sweden) Eskilstuna)
14	MF	ROU	Robert Lică (to Free agent)
15	MF	CHN	Lü Yuefeng (to (China) Zhejiang Yiteng)
18	FW	ROU	Adrian Nichifor (to Filiași)
20	MF	ROU	Alexandru Trancă (to Viitorul Târgu Jiu)
23	DF	FRA	Ludovic Erhard (to Free agent)
26	DF	ROU	Marius Almic (to Free agent, previously on loan at Filiași)
70	FW	ROU	Bogdan Dănăricu (to Gilortul Târgu Cărbunești)
—	GK	ROU	Alexandru Krupenschi (to Viitorul Târgu Jiu)
—	DF	ROU	Alexandru Dinu-Ivănescu (to Viitorul Târgu Jiu)
—	MF	ROU	Hery Kim (to Free agent)
—	FW	ROU	Florin Măicăneanu (to Filiași)

=== Petrolul Ploiești ===
In:

No.	Pos.	Nation	Player
3	DF	NED	Bart Meijers (from (Netherlands) Almere City)
9	FW	ROU	Valentin Balint (from Mioveni)
10	MF	ISR	Nir Lax (from (Israel) Hapoel Tel Aviv)
11	MF	ROU	Răzvan Matiș (on loan from Viitorul Constanța, previously on loan at Argeș Pitești)
14	FW	ROU	Vasile Buhăescu (from Argeș Pitești)
16	DF	BEL	Joeri Poelmans (from (Netherlands) Helmond Sport)
18	MF	GHA	Amidu Salifu (from (Italy) Fiorentina, previously on loan at (Kuwait) Al-Salmiya)
28	MF	ROU	Alexandru Dumitru (from (Spain) Rayo Majadahonda)
29	FW	MLI	Sory Diarra (from Ceahlăul Piatra Neamț)
68	GK	MDA	Nicolai Cebotari (from (Moldova) Sheriff Tiraspol, previously on loan at (Moldova) Sfântul Gheorghe Suruceni)
77	DF	ISR	Ben Levy (from (Israel) Hapoel Petah Tikva)
87	MF	ITA	Bryan Mendoza (on loan from Botoșani)
88	MF	AUT	Manuel Botic (from (Austria) Admira Wacker)
—	GK	BUL	Georgi Kitanov (from Astra Giurgiu)
—	DF	POR	Marian Huja (from (Denmark) HB Køge)
—	DF	COL	Jhon Mondragón (from Free agent)
—	MF	ROU	Raul Bucur (loan return from Sportul Snagov)

Out:

No.	Pos.	Nation	Player
3	MF	PAR	David Meza (to Argeș Pitești)
9	FW	TUN	Hamza Younes (to (Greece) AEL)
10	MF	ROU	Laurențiu Marinescu (to Mioveni)
20	DF	ROU	Ștefan Bărboianu (to Turris Turnu Măgurele)
24	MF	ARG	Leonel Pierce (to (Argentina) Estudiantes de Caseros)
24	MF	MDA	Eugen Zasavițchi (to Free agent, previously signed from Minaur Baia Mare)
27	MF	ROU	Gabriel Deac (to Argeș Pitești)
28	FW	ROU	Sergiu Arnăutu (to Concordia Chiajna)
33	DF	ROU	Cristian Sîrghi (to Oțelul Galați)
35	GK	MDA	Cristian Apostolachi (to Free agent)
78	DF	ROU	Andrei Rus (to Free agent, previously on loan at UTA Arad)
89	FW	ROU	Ștefan Blănaru (to Turris Turnu Măgurele)

=== Rapid București ===
In:

No.	Pos.	Nation	Player
1	GK	AUS	Harrison Devenish-Meares (from Free agent)
2	DF	GRE	Anestis Nastos (from (Greece) OFI Crete)
9	FW	ROU	Cătălin Țîră (from Voluntari)
14	MF	ROU	Alin Fică (on loan from CFR Cluj)
16	DF	ROU	Vlad Mocioacă (loan return from Viitorul Dăești)
18	FW	ROU	Gabriel Toma (loan return from Dunărea Călărași)
20	FW	ROU	Daniel Benzar (from Voluntari)
22	DF	ROU	Mircea Leasă (from Voluntari)
27	DF	ROU	Radu Crișan (on loan from Astra Giurgiu)
30	MF	ROU	Raul Costin (from Mioveni)
88	DF	ROU	Alexandru Dandea (from Astra Giurgiu)
93	FW	ROU	Alexandru Pop (from Poli Timișoara)
99	FW	ROU	Adrian Bălan (from Hermannstadt)

Out:

No.	Pos.	Nation	Player
1	GK	ROU	Mihai Popa (loan return to Astra Giurgiu)
2	DF	ROU	Robert Băjan (to Farul Constanța)
3	DF	DOM	Tano Bonnin (to (Spain) Hércules)
4	DF	ROU	Alexandru Iacob (to Mioveni)
9	FW	ROU	Valentin Alexandru (to Dunărea Călărași)
11	MF	ROU	Alin Cârstocea (to Dunărea Călărași)
14	FW	FRA	Brighton Labeau (to (Belgium) Royale Union Saint-Gilloise)
18	MF	MAR	Saifeddine Alami (to Dunărea Călărași)
19	MF	ROU	Geani Crețu (loan return to Dinamo București)
20	MF	AUT	Sandro Djurić (to Dunărea Călărași)
22	MF	URU	Facundo Piriz (to Free agent)
26	DF	URU	Facundo Mallo (to Defensor Sporting)
27	FW	ROU	Gabriel Dodoi (to Pandurii Târgu Jiu, previously on loan at CSM Reșița)
98	DF	ROU	Paul Copaci (to Viitorul Târgu Jiu)
—	DF	ROU	Adrian Neacșu (to Ripensia Timișoara, previously on loan at Foresta Suceava)

=== Ripensia Timișoara ===
In:

No.	Pos.	Nation	Player
3	DF	SRB	Nenad Lalić (from (Bosnia and Herzegovina) Modriča)
6	DF	ROU	Adrian Neacșu (from Rapid București)
9	FW	SRB	Nemanja Soković (from (Serbia) 1. Maj Ruma)
12	GK	ROU	Haralambie Mociu (loan return from Foresta Suceava)
21	MF	CIV	Stephan Coulibaly (from UTA Arad)
26	DF	MDA	Radu Rogac (from (Moldova) Dinamo-Auto Tiraspol)
—	DF	ROU	Harald Fridrich (from Carani)

Out:

No.	Pos.	Nation	Player
2	DF	ROU	Caius Lungu (to CSM Reșița)
3	DF	ROU	Ionuț Gavrilă (to Șoimii Lipova)
5	DF	ROU	Andrei Tânc (to Minaur Baia Mare)
6	DF	ROU	Claudiu Apro (to Miercurea Ciuc)
7	DF	ROU	Adrian Popa (to Free agent)
12	GK	ROU	Horațiu Moldovan (to UTA Arad)
16	MF	ROU	Florin Dobie (on loan to Șoimii Lipova)
20	MF	ROU	George Monea (to Free agent)
23	FW	ROU	Vlad Chera (loan return to Viitorul Constanța, later on loan to CSM Reșița)
25	DF	ROU	Mihai Hecsko (to ACS Poli Timișoara)
—	MF	ALB	Nafi Iseini (to Free agent, previously on loan at ACS Poli Timișoara)

=== SCM Gloria Buzău ===
In:

No.	Pos.	Nation	Player
2	MF	ROU	Ciprian Petre (loan return from Focșani)
7	MF	ROU	Cristian Ciobanu (from Turris Turnu Măgurele)
10	MF	ROU	Cosmin Tucaliuc (on loan from Viitorul Constanța)
20	MF	ROU	Paul Pațurcă (from Turris Turnu Măgurele)
31	MF	ROU	Alexandru Piftor (from Botoșani, previously on loan at Chindia Târgoviște)
93	FW	MDA	Maxim Iurcu (from (Moldova) Sfântul Gheorghe Suruceni)
99	DF	ROU	Gabriel Nedelea (on loan from Viitorul Constanța)
—	MF	MDA	Gheorghe Anton (from (Azerbaijan) Zira)

Out:

No.	Pos.	Nation	Player
2	DF	ROU	Alexandru Gîț (to FC U Craiova)
4	DF	ROU	Dragoș Ceaușel (to Râmnicu Sărat)
7	MF	ROU	Bogdan Gavrilă (to Oțelul Galați)
17	MF	ROU	David Stăiculescu (loan return to Voluntari II)
22	GK	ROU	Cristian Andrei (loan return to FCSB II)
30	DF	ROU	Călin Tudose (loan return to FCSB II)
72	MF	ROU	Mădălin Calu (to Dunărea Călărași, previously on loan at CSM Reșița)
77	MF	ROU	Valentin Munteanu (to FC U Craiova)
97	MF	ROU	Robert Candrea (to Dunărea Călărași)

=== Slatina ===
In:

No.	Pos.	Nation	Player
2	MF	ROU	Andrei Iana (from Deva)
9	MF	ROU	Ianis Stoica (on loan from FCSB, previously on loan at Metaloglobus București)
31	MF	ROU	Daniel Rogoveanu (from FC U Craiova)
—	DF	ROU	Adrian Bărbuți (loan return from Viitorul Dăești)
—	DF	ROU	Vlad Motroc (from Academica Clinceni)

Out:

No.	Pos.	Nation	Player
2	DF	ROU	Eugen Militaru (on loan to Petrolul Potcoava)
22	GK	ROU	Raul Bărbărău (to Free agent)
—	MF	ROU	Laurențiu Ana (on loan to Petrolul Potcoava)
—	MF	ROU	Cătălin Găină (to Free agent)

=== Turris Turnu Măgurele ===
In:

No.	Pos.	Nation	Player
8	DF	ROU	Alexandru Sima (on loan from Viitorul Constanța)
11	FW	ROU	Romeo Niță (on loan from FCSB)
12	GK	ROU	Dimitri Ioniță (on loan from Concordia Chiajna)
13	MF	ROU	Alexandru Nicola (from FCSB II, previously on loan at Farul Constanța)
20	DF	ROU	Ștefan Bărboianu (from Petrolul Ploiești)
23	MF	ROU	Liviu Mihai (from Chindia Târgoviște)
29	MF	ROU	Cristian Pușcaș (from UTA Arad)
47	FW	MDA	Ilie Damașcan (from (Moldova) Petrocub Hîncești)
89	FW	ROU	Ștefan Blănaru (from Petrolul Ploiești)
90	FW	ROU	Vlad Rusu (from Viitorul Târgu Jiu)
—	GK	ROU	Răzvan Ducan (on loan from FCSB, previously on loan at Argeș Pitești)

Out:

No.	Pos.	Nation	Player
8	MF	SEN	Pape Gassama (to Free agent)
11	MF	ROU	Cristian Ciobanu (to SCM Gloria Buzău)
12	GK	ROU	Dragoș Petrișor (loan return to Dinamo București, later on loan to Aerostar Bacău)
18	MF	ROU	Claudiu Moisie (to Free agent)
23	DF	NGA	Samson Nwabueze (to Viitorul Dăești)
30	MF	ROU	George Călințaru (to Steaua București)
41	MF	ROU	Dragoș Tescan (on loan to UTA Arad)
77	MF	ROU	Tiberiu Serediuc (to Free agent)
80	MF	ROU	Paul Pațurcă (to SCM Gloria Buzău)
93	FW	ROU	Sergiu Negruț (to Mioveni)
—	MF	ROU	Octavian Popescu (loan return to FCSB, previously on loan)
—	MF	ROU	Daniel Vîlsan (loan return to Sport Team București)

=== Unirea Slobozia ===
In:

No.	Pos.	Nation	Player
3	FW	ROU	Andrei Trucă (on loan from FCSB II)
4	DF	ROU	Alexandru Dinu (on loan from FCSB II)
15	DF	ROU	Robert Ghiță (on loan from Viitorul Constanța)
18	MF	ROU	Mihai Adăscăliței (from Tunari)
25	FW	ROU	Radu Pocol (on loan from Viitorul Constanța)

Out:

No.	Pos.	Nation	Player
13	MF	ROU	Ovidiu Stroie (to Free agent)
15	DF	ROU	Darius Drăghici (to Free agent)
18	MF	ROU	Mihai Milotin (to Free agent)
33	GK	ROU	Victor Enache (to Free agent)
—	DF	ROU	Mădălin Pascu (to Free agent)
—	FW	ROU	Nicolae Herțu (to Free agent)

=== Universitatea Cluj ===
In:

No.	Pos.	Nation	Player
1	GK	ROU	Vlad Muțiu (from Farul Constanța)
4	MF	ROU	Ioan Filip (from Dinamo București)
8	MF	ROU	Daniel Novac (from Chindia Târgoviște)
9	FW	ARG	Matías Roskopf (from (Cyprus) Apollon Limassol)
10	FW	ISR	Idan Golan (from (Israel) Hapoel Nof HaGalil)
12	GK	ROU	Cosmin Vâtcă (from Free agent)
24	DF	ROU	Srdjan Luchin (from Hermannstadt)
26	DF	ROU	Laurențiu Rus (from CSM Reșița)
30	DF	ROU	Gabriel Tamaș (from Astra Giurgiu)
70	MF	ROU	Alexandru Negrean (on loan from Viitorul Constanța, previously on loan at Viitorul Târgu Jiu)
83	MF	POR	Sérgio Ribeiro (from (Portugal) Oliveirense)
—	DF	ROU	Mihai Cohan (loan return from Comuna Recea)

Out:

No.	Pos.	Nation	Player
4	DF	ROU	Răzvan Horj (loan return to CFR Cluj, later signed by Gaz Metan Mediaș)
7	MF	ROU	Sebastian Mailat (loan return to CFR Cluj, later on loan to Voluntari)
8	MF	ROU	Rareș Takács (to Miercurea Ciuc)
9	FW	ROU	Marius Coman (to Comuna Recea)
10	MF	ROU	George Florescu (to Free agent)
14	DF	MDA	Artur Crăciun (to (Hungary) Budapest Honvéd)
21	GK	ROU	Cosmin Dur-Bozoancă (loan return to Viitorul Constanța)
23	MF	ROU	Vlad Mihalcea (to Aerostar Bacău)
31	DF	CPV	Kay (to Free agent)
—	MF	ROU	Dragoș Penescu (loan return to Botoșani, later signed by Dinamo II București)
—	GK	ROU	Rareș Pop (to Chindia Târgoviște)
—	DF	ROU	Renato Imbrea (to Free agent, previously on loan at Luceafărul Oradea)
—	DF	ROU	Marius Potcoavă (to Comuna Recea, previously on loan)
—	DF	ROU	Tudor Vomir (on loan to Unirea Dej)
—	MF	ROU	Andrei Cobârzan (to Sticla Arieșul Turda, previously on loan)
—	MF	ROU	Adrian Micaș (to Comuna Recea, previously on loan)
—	MF	ROU	Tudor Nicholas (to Free agent)
—	MF	ROU	Alexandru Oltean (to Comuna Recea, previously on loan)
—	FW	ROU	Mihai Forna (to SCM Zalău)

=== Viitorul Târgu Jiu ===
In:

No.	Pos.	Nation	Player
6	FW	ROU	Vlad Șerbănescu (on loan from FCSB II)
8	DF	ROU	Paul Copaci (from Rapid București)
14	MF	ROU	Alexandru Trancă (from Pandurii Târgu Jiu)
25	MF	ROU	Vlad Costea (from Luceafărul Oradea)
27	FW	ROU	Andrei Ludușan (from Luceafărul Oradea)
77	MF	ROU	Alexandru Dinu-Ivănescu (from Pandurii Târgu Jiu)
—	GK	MDA	Denis Rusu (from Politehnica Iași)
—	GK	ROU	Alexandru Krupenschi (from Pandurii Târgu Jiu)
—	MF	ROU	Goran Paunchici (from UTA II Arad)

Out:

No.	Pos.	Nation	Player
6	DF	ROU	Alexandru Negrean (loan return to Viitorul Constanța, later on loan to Universitatea Cluj)
9	FW	ROU	Vlad Rusu (to Turris Turnu Măgurele)
10	FW	ROU	Vasile Pop (to Minaur Baia Mare)
21	DF	CIV	François Yabré (to Aerostar Bacău)
25	DF	ROU	Robert Băciuț (loan return to FCSB II)
26	DF	ROU	Cristian Oroș (to Luceafărul Oradea)
33	GK	ROU	Iulian Anca-Trip (to Aerostar Bacău)
—	MF	ROU	Mark Parnău (to Minaur Baia Mare, previously on loan at Luceafărul Oradea)
—	MF	ROU	Gabriel Preoteasa (to Focșani)
