= List of Romanian football transfers winter 2020–21 =

This is a list of Romanian football transfers for the 2020–21 winter transfer window. Only moves featuring 2020–21 Liga I and 2020–21 Liga II are listed.

== Liga I ==
=== Academica Clinceni ===
In:

| No. | Pos. | Nation | Player |
|---|---|---|---|
| 7 | MF | FRA | Thibault Moulin (from (France) MOS Caen) |
| 12 | GK | ROU | Aurelian Păun (from Turris Turnu Măgurele) |
| 77 | MF | ROU | Adrian Popa (from Voluntari) |
| 90 | FW | BUL | Martin Toshev (from (Kazakhstan) Zhetysu) |
| — | MF | ROU | Iulian Ștefan (from Pandurii Târgu Jiu) |

Out:

| No. | Pos. | Nation | Player |
|---|---|---|---|
| 7 | MF | ROU | Petrișor Petrescu (to Hermannstadt) |
| 9 | FW | MDA | Alexandru Boiciuc (to (Italy) Turris) |
| 18 | MF | ROU | Florinel Sandu (loan return to Sport Team) |
| 20 | MF | ROU | Marian Șerban (loan return to CSU Craiova, later on loan to Mioveni) |
| 31 | MF | ROU | Marius Ciobanu (on loan to Unirea Slobozia) |
| 99 | MF | ROU | Bogdan Ilie (to Free agent) |

=== Argeș Pitești ===
In:

| No. | Pos. | Nation | Player |
|---|---|---|---|
| 6 | MF | ESP | Pablo de Lucas (from Voluntari) |
| 7 | FW | ROU | Cristian Dumitru (on loan from FCSB) |
| 16 | FW | BRA | Ruan Teles (from (Portugal) Marítimo) |
| 19 | DF | BEL | Jimmy De Jonghe (from Free agent) |
| 25 | DF | ROU | Deian Boldor (from (Italy) Potenza) |

Out:

| No. | Pos. | Nation | Player |
|---|---|---|---|
| 3 | DF | ROU | Daniel Șerbănică (to Mioveni) |
| 6 | MF | ROU | Andrei Panait (to Mioveni) |
| 7 | MF | ROU | Andrei Blejdea (to Dinamo București) |
| 16 | DF | ROU | Gabriel Matei (to (Poland) Górnik Łęczna) |
| 19 | MF | ROU | Andrei Prepeliță (Retired) |
| — | MF | FRA | Clément Couturier (to (France) Bastia-Borgo, previously signed from Free agent) |
| — | MF | ROU | André Cozma (to Hușana Huși, previously on loan at Mioveni) |
| — | MF | ROU | Gabriel Deac (to Concordia Chiajna) |

=== Astra Giurgiu ===
In:

| No. | Pos. | Nation | Player |
|---|---|---|---|
| 3 | DF | CMR | Abdel Lamanje (from (Kazakhstan) Shakhter Karagandy) |
| 9 | FW | BIH | Sulejman Krpić (from (South Korea) Suwon Samsung Bluewings) |
| 27 | DF | CRO | Igor Jovanović (from (South Korea) Seongnam) |
| 28 | DF | MNE | Momčilo Raspopović (from (Croatia) Rijeka) |
| 91 | MF | FRA | Yann Boé-Kane (from Free agent) |

Out:

| No. | Pos. | Nation | Player |
|---|---|---|---|
| 3 | DF | MNE | Risto Radunović (to FCSB) |
| 5 | DF | ROU | Constantin Dima (to (Ukraine) Desna Chernihiv) |
| 10 | MF | ROU | Constantin Budescu (to (Saudi Arabia) Damac) |
| 13 | DF | MDA | Dinu Graur (to (Greece) AEL) |
| 18 | FW | ISR | Shlomi Azulay (to (Israel) Hapoel Tel Aviv, previously signed from Free agent) |
| 27 | MF | ROU | Romario Moise (on loan to Petrolul Ploiești) |
| — | DF | ROU | Radu Crișan (on loan to Dunărea Călărași, previously on loan at Rapid București) |

=== Botoșani ===
In:

| No. | Pos. | Nation | Player |
|---|---|---|---|
| 3 | DF | CIV | Ulrich Meleke (from (Finland) KPV) |
| 9 | FW | SYR | Mahmoud Al-Mawas (from Free agent) |
| 18 | MF | FRA | Malcom Edjouma (from (Belgium) Roeselare) |
| 25 | DF | FRA | Bogdan Racovițan (from (France) Dijon) |

Out:

| No. | Pos. | Nation | Player |
|---|---|---|---|
| 2 | DF | ROU | Denis Haruț (to FCSB) |
| 10 | MF | MKD | David Babunski (to Viitorul Constanța) |
| 31 | FW | ESP | Victor Fernández (to (Spain) Cornellà, previously signed from Viitorul Constanța) |
| 38 | DF | FRA | Baba Touré (to Free agent) |
| 66 | FW | GRE | Minas Chalkiadakis (to Free agent) |
| 69 | FW | ROU | Bogdan Melinte (to Minaur Baia Mare) |
| 87 | MF | ARG | Bryan Mendoza (on loan to Comuna Recea, previously on loan at Petrolul Ploiești) |

=== CFR Cluj ===
In:

| No. | Pos. | Nation | Player |
|---|---|---|---|
| 8 | MF | ISL | Rúnar Már Sigurjónsson (from (Kazakhstan) Astana) |
| 15 | DF | TUN | Syam Ben Youssef (from Free agent) |
| 37 | MF | ROU | Mihai Bordeianu (on loan from (Saudi Arabia) Al-Qadsiah) |

Out:

| No. | Pos. | Nation | Player |
|---|---|---|---|
| 8 | MF | CRO | Damjan Đoković (to (Turkey) Çaykur Rizespor) |
| 21 | DF | CRO | Ivica Žunić (to Rapid București) |
| 74 | GK | ROU | Ionuț Rus (on loan to Hermannstadt) |
| 77 | FW | SVK | Jakub Vojtuš (to (Hungary) Mezőkövesd) |
| 97 | MF | ROU | Alin Fică (on loan to Comuna Recea, previously on loan at Rapid București) |

=== Chindia Târgoviște ===
In:

| No. | Pos. | Nation | Player |
|---|---|---|---|
| 23 | DF | SLO | Milan Kocić (from Voluntari) |
| 27 | DF | ROU | Florinel Mitrea (from Turris Turnu Măgurele) |
| 29 | FW | ROU | Mihai Costea (from Free agent) |
| 95 | DF | ROU | Daniel Celea (from (Poland) ŁKS Łódź) |

Out:

| No. | Pos. | Nation | Player |

=== Dinamo București ===
In:

| No. | Pos. | Nation | Player |
|---|---|---|---|
| 1 | GK | NOR | Gudmund Kongshavn (from (Norway) Aalesund) |
| 7 | DF | ROU | Steliano Filip (from (Greece) AEL) |
| 10 | FW | CUW | Gevaro Nepomuceno (from (England) Halifax Town) |
| 19 | FW | ROU | Andrei Blejdea (from Argeș Pitești) |
| 26 | MF | SWE | Jonathan Morsay (on loan from (Italy) Chievo) |
| 33 | DF | ROU | Dan Tălmaciu (loan return from Politehnica Iași) |

Out:

| No. | Pos. | Nation | Player |
|---|---|---|---|
| 1 | GK | ESP | Tomás Mejías (loan return to (England) Middlesbrough, later signed by (Turkey) Ankaraspor) |
| 7 | MF | ESP | Juan Cámara (loan return to (Poland) Jagiellonia Białystok, later on loan to Universitatea Craiova) |
| 10 | FW | ESP | Borja Valle (to (Spain) Real Oviedo) |
| 18 | DF | ESP | Isma López (to (Spain) Racing Santander) |
| 20 | DF | ROU | Andrei Sin (to Viitorul Târgu Jiu) |
| 21 | DF | VEN | Alexander González (to (Spain) Málaga) |
| 33 | GK | ESP | René Román (to (Spain) Atlético Baleares) |
| 35 | DF | SEN | Abdoulaye Ba (to (Portugal) Moreirense) |
| 75 | MF | ESP | Aleix García (to (Spain) Eibar) |

=== FCSB ===
In:

| No. | Pos. | Nation | Player |
|---|---|---|---|
| 6 | DF | ROU | Denis Haruț (from Botoșani) |
| 9 | FW | CRO | Ante Vukušić (from (Slovenia) Olimpija Ljubljana) |
| 33 | DF | MNE | Risto Radunović (from Astra Giurgiu) |
| 92 | FW | ROU | Adrian Niță (loan return from Turris Turnu Măgurele) |

Out:

| No. | Pos. | Nation | Player |
|---|---|---|---|
| 6 | DF | ROU | Marius Briceag (on loan to Voluntari) |
| 9 | FW | ROU | Sergiu Buș (to (South Korea) Seongnam) |
| 12 | GK | ROU | Răzvan Ducan (on loan to Mioveni, previously on loan at Turris Turnu Măgurele) |
| 19 | FW | ROU | Adrian Petre (on loan to UTA Arad, previously on loan at (Italy) Cosenza) |
| 22 | FW | ROU | Cristian Dumitru (on loan to Argeș Pitești) |
| 40 | DF | ROU | Ștefan Cană (on loan to Politehnica Iași) |
| 44 | DF | ROU | Gabriel Enache (to Free agent) |
| 98 | FW | ROU | Dennis Man (to (Italy) Parma) |

=== Gaz Metan Mediaș ===
In:

| No. | Pos. | Nation | Player |
|---|---|---|---|
| 27 | MF | BRA | Eric (from Voluntari) |
| 71 | FW | ROU | Vlad Morar (from UTA Arad) |
| 77 | FW | SEN | Adama Sarr (from (Turkey) Tuzlaspor) |

Out:

| No. | Pos. | Nation | Player |
|---|---|---|---|
| 6 | MF | CZE | Lukáš Droppa (to Voluntari) |
| 19 | FW | CZE | Tomáš Smola (on loan to (Czech Republic) Opava) |
| 27 | FW | ITA | Nicolao Dumitru (to (South Korea) Suwon Samsung Bluewings) |
| 77 | FW | NED | Moussa Sanoh (to (Malta) Balzan) |

=== Hermannstadt ===
In:

| No. | Pos. | Nation | Player |
|---|---|---|---|
| 7 | MF | ROU | Petrișor Petrescu (from Academica Clinceni) |
| 9 | FW | ROU | Adrian Șter (from Free agent) |
| 10 | MF | SYR | Aias Aosman (from (Turkey) Tuzlaspor) |
| 16 | DF | GHA | Seydou Issah (from Free agent) |
| 22 | GK | ROU | Ionuț Rus (on loan from CFR Cluj) |
| 26 | FW | CRO | Ante Aralica (from (Bulgaria) Lokomotiv Plovdiv) |
| 30 | MF | FRA | Billal Sebaihi (from (Kazakhstan) Caspiy) |
| 32 | FW | CRO | Dražen Bagarić (from (Slovenia) Olimpija Ljubljana) |
| 34 | DF | ARG | Patricio Matricardi (from (Russia) Rotor Volgograd) |
| 51 | MF | ROU | Alexandru Oroian (from UTA Arad) |
| 77 | DF | ROU | Alexandru Mățel (from Free agent) |
| 93 | MF | ROU | Călin Popescu (from UTA Arad) |

Out:

| No. | Pos. | Nation | Player |
|---|---|---|---|
| 10 | MF | POR | David Caiado (to (Portugal) Penafiel) |
| 11 | FW | BRA | Jô Santos (to Viitorul Constanța) |
| 16 | DF | ROU | Luca Florică (to Rapid București) |
| 44 | DF | ESP | Ángel Bastos (to (Spain) Rayo Majadahonda) |
| 93 | MF | HAI | Soni Mustivar (to (Cyprus) Nea Salamis) |

=== Politehnica Iași ===
In:

| No. | Pos. | Nation | Player |
|---|---|---|---|
| 5 | DF | ROU | Ștefan Cană (on loan from FCSB) |
| 12 | GK | ROU | Laurențiu Brănescu (from Free agent) |
| 22 | MF | ARG | Pablo Gaitán (from (Paraguay) General Díaz) |
| 28 | FW | MNE | Uroš Đuranović (from (Serbia) Radnički Niš) |
| 32 | MF | VEN | Rafael Acosta (from Free agent) |
| 42 | FW | ROU | Alexandru Zaharia (loan return from Aerostar Bacău) |
| 70 | MF | CRC | Dylan Flores (from (Costa Rica) Alajuelense) |
| 77 | FW | CRC | Deyver Vega (from (Norway) Sandefjord) |

Out:

| No. | Pos. | Nation | Player |
|---|---|---|---|
| 6 | MF | ALB | Donaldo Açka (to Universitatea Cluj) |
| 16 | GK | HUN | Levente Bősz (to Free agent) |
| 26 | DF | BEL | Manuel Angiulli (to (Netherlands) MVV) |
| 32 | FW | ARG | Lucas Chacana (to Universitatea Cluj) |
| 33 | GK | ROU | Denis Ciofu (on loan to Unirea Slobozia) |
| 42 | DF | ROU | Dan Tălmaciu (loan return to Dinamo București) |
| 77 | MF | ISR | Gai Assulin (to (Italy) Crema) |
| 86 | MF | NED | Nicandro Breeveld (to Free agent) |

=== Sepsi Sfântu Gheorghe ===
In:

| No. | Pos. | Nation | Player |
|---|---|---|---|
| 14 | MF | ESP | Eder González (from Miercurea Ciuc) |
| 22 | FW | ROU | Nándor Tamás (on loan from (Hungary) Puskás Akadémia) |
| 25 | FW | SUI | Simone Rapp (from (Switzerland) Lausanne-Sport) |
| 82 | DF | SVK | Branislav Niňaj (from (Netherlands) Fortuna Sittard) |

Out:

| No. | Pos. | Nation | Player |
|---|---|---|---|
| 1 | GK | ROU | Béla Fejér (on loan to (Hungary) Nyíregyháza Spartacus, previously returned from loan) |
| 14 | MF | ROU | Vlad Mitrea (on loan to Petrolul Ploiești) |

=== Universitatea Craiova ===
In:

| No. | Pos. | Nation | Player |
|---|---|---|---|
| 21 | MF | SUI | Matteo Fedele (from (France) Valenciennes) |
| 24 | MF | ESP | Juan Cámara (on loan from (Poland) Jagiellonia Białystok, previously on loan at Dinamo București) |
| 30 | FW | CRO | Ivan Mamut (from (Croatia) Inter Zaprešić, previously on loan) |

Out:

| No. | Pos. | Nation | Player |
|---|---|---|---|
| 15 | MF | ROU | Marian Șerban (on loan to Mioveni, previously on loan at Academica Clinceni) |
| 21 | MF | BUL | Antoni Ivanov (on loan to Voluntari) |
| — | FW | ROU | Alexandru Popescu (on loan to Aerostar Bacău, previously on loan at ASU Politehnica Timișoara) |

=== UTA Arad ===
In:

| No. | Pos. | Nation | Player |
|---|---|---|---|
| 5 | MF | LTU | Modestas Vorobjovas (from (Lithuania) Žalgiris) |
| 8 | FW | ROU | Liviu Antal (from (Lithuania) Žalgiris) |
| 9 | MF | BRA | Roger (from (Latvia) Riga) |
| 11 | FW | ROU | Adrian Petre (on loan from FCSB, previously on loan at (Italy) Cosenza) |
| 31 | GK | ROU | Haralambie Mociu (from Ripensia Timișoara) |
| 44 | FW | ROU | Albert Voinea (from Turris Turnu Măgurele) |
| 55 | DF | RUS | Yevgeni Shlyakov (from (Russia) Tambov) |
| 77 | DF | ROU | Andrei Peteleu (from (Moldova) Sheriff Tiraspol) |

Out:

| No. | Pos. | Nation | Player |
|---|---|---|---|
| 7 | FW | ROU | Octavian Ursu (to Rapid București) |
| 9 | FW | ROU | Alexandru Ioniță (to Rapid București) |
| 11 | MF | ROU | Alexandru Oroian (to Hermannstadt) |
| 15 | MF | ROU | Călin Popescu (to Hermannstadt) |
| 25 | DF | ROU | Marian Pleașcă (to Free agent) |
| 29 | MF | CRO | Mihovil Klapan (to (Croatia) Opatija) |
| 31 | GK | ROU | Horațiu Moldovan (to Rapid București) |
| 77 | FW | ROU | Vlad Morar (to Gaz Metan Mediaș) |
| 97 | MF | ROU | Denis Hrezdac (on loan to Hunedoara) |

=== Viitorul Constanța ===
In:

| No. | Pos. | Nation | Player |
|---|---|---|---|
| 9 | FW | LAT | Valērijs Šabala (from (Lithuania) Sūduva) |
| 10 | MF | MKD | David Babunski (from Botoșani) |
| 11 | FW | BRA | Jô Santos (from Hermannstadt) |
| 19 | FW | CGO | Juvhel Tsoumou (from (China) Liaoning Shenyang Urban) |
| 22 | MF | ROU | Florian Haită (loan return from Turris-Oltul Turnu Măgurele) |
| 30 | MF | ROU | Răzvan Grădinaru (from Voluntari) |
| 42 | DF | MDA | Artur Crăciun (on loan from (Hungary) Budapest Honvéd) |
| 98 | MF | ROU | Răzvan Matiș (loan return from Petrolul Ploiești) |

Out:

| No. | Pos. | Nation | Player |
|---|---|---|---|
| 1 | GK | ROU | Árpád Tordai (on loan to (Hungary) Fehérvár) |
| 6 | DF | NED | Bradley de Nooijer (on loan to (Ukraine) Vorskla Poltava) |
| 10 | FW | ROU | Gabriel Iancu (to (Russia) Akhmat Grozny) |
| 11 | FW | ESP | Victor Fernández (to Botoșani, later signed by (Spain) Cornellà) |
| 16 | DF | ESP | Ángel Martínez (to (Greece) Lamia) |
| 39 | MF | ROU | Adrian Stoian (to (Italy) Ascoli) |
| 42 | FW | NED | Kevin Luckassen (to (Turkey) Kayserispor) |

=== Voluntari ===
In:

| No. | Pos. | Nation | Player |
|---|---|---|---|
| 4 | MF | BUL | Antoni Ivanov (on loan from Universitatea Craiova) |
| 6 | DF | ROU | Marius Briceag (on loan from FCSB) |
| 7 | FW | CRO | Ivan Pešić (on loan from (Ukraine) Vorskla Poltava) |
| 18 | MF | CPV | Hélder Tavares (from (Turkey) Giresunspor) |
| 19 | FW | MKD | Viktor Angelov (from (Bosnia and Herzegovina) Široki Brijeg) |
| 30 | DF | ROU | Gabriel Tamaș (from Universitatea Cluj) |
| 44 | MF | BEL | Martin Remacle (from Pandurii Târgu Jiu) |
| 66 | MF | CZE | Lukáš Droppa (from Gaz Metan Mediaș) |
| 90 | DF | ALG | Mourad Satli (from (Qatar) Muaither) |

Out:

| No. | Pos. | Nation | Player |
|---|---|---|---|
| 6 | MF | ESP | Pablo de Lucas (to Argeș Pitești) |
| 7 | MF | ROU | Răzvan Grădinaru (to Viitorul Constanța) |
| 10 | MF | BRA | Eric (to Gaz Metan Mediaș) |
| 20 | DF | ROU | Oktay Özkara (on loan to Unirea Slobozia) |
| 29 | DF | FRA | Grégoire Puel (to Free agent) |
| 32 | DF | SLO | Milan Kocić (to Chindia Târgoviște) |
| 88 | MF | ROU | Adrian Popa (to Academica Clinceni) |

== Liga II ==
=== Aerostar Bacău ===
In:

| No. | Pos. | Nation | Player |
|---|---|---|---|
| — | DF | ROU | Dănuț Munteanu (from Focșani) |
| — | MF | ISR | Yaniv Segev (on loan from Universitatea Cluj) |
| — | FW | ROU | Alexandru Popescu (on loan from Universitatea Craiova, previously on loan at ASU Politehnica Timișoara) |

Out:

| No. | Pos. | Nation | Player |
|---|---|---|---|
| — | GK | ROU | Bogdan Miron (Retired) |
| — | DF | ROU | Stejărel Vișinar (to Bucovina Rădăuți, previously on loan at ACS Foresta Suceava) |
| — | MF | ROU | Șerban Tîrlă (loan return to Universitatea Cluj, later on loan at Minaur Baia Mare) |
| — | FW | ROU | Alexandru Zaharia (loan return to Politehnica Iași) |

=== ASU Politehnica Timișoara ===
In:

| No. | Pos. | Nation | Player |
|---|---|---|---|
| — | GK | ROU | George Păduraru (from Ripensia Timișoara) |
| — | DF | ROU | Cristian Bocșan (from Ghiroda) |
| — | MF | ROU | Romario Rus (from Comuna Recea) |
| — | FW | SRB | Pavle Radunović (from (Serbia) Rad) |

Out:

| No. | Pos. | Nation | Player |
|---|---|---|---|
| — | MF | ROU | Rareș Toader (loan return to FCSB II) |
| — | FW | ROU | Alexandru Popescu (loan return to Universitatea Craiova, later on loan at Aerostar Bacău) |
| — | GK | SLO | Marko Deronja (to Free agent) |
| — | MF | ROU | Bogdan Vasile (to Unirea Slobozia) |
| — | MF | ROU | Raul Vidrăsan (on loan to Unirea Ungheni) |

=== Comuna Recea ===
In:

| No. | Pos. | Nation | Player |
|---|---|---|---|
| — | DF | ROU | Andrei Gal (from Pandurii Târgu Jiu) |
| — | MF | ROU | Alin Fică (on loan from CFR Cluj) |

Out:

| No. | Pos. | Nation | Player |
|---|---|---|---|
| — | DF | AUS | Ante Bakmaz (to Free agent) |
| — | DF | ROU | Vlad Opriș (to Sportul Șimleu Silvaniei) |
| — | MF | ROU | Romario Rus (to ASU Politehnica Timișoara) |
| — | FW | COD | Arsène Luboya (to FC U Craiova) |

=== Concordia Chiajna ===
In:

| No. | Pos. | Nation | Player |
|---|---|---|---|
| — | DF | ROU | Bogdan Manole (from Rapid București) |
| — | MF | ROU | Gabriel Deac (from Argeș Pitești) |

Out:

| No. | Pos. | Nation | Player |
|---|---|---|---|
| — | DF | ROU | Stelian Cucu (to Oțelul Galați) |
| — | DF | GRE | Christos Intzidis (to Free agent) |
| — | MF | ROU | Baudouin Kanda (to Dunărea Călărași) |
| — | MF | FRA | Karim Safsaf (to Free agent) |
| — | FW | ROU | Sergiu Arnăutu (to Petrolul Ploiești) |
| — | FW | FRA | Philippe Nsiah (to Steaua București) |

=== CSM Reșița ===
In:

| No. | Pos. | Nation | Player |
|---|---|---|---|
| — | DF | ROU | Alexandru Sălcianu (from Turris Turnu Măgurele) |
| — | DF | ROU | Alexandru Sima (on loan from Viitorul Constanța, previously on loan at Turris Turnu Măgurele) |

Out:

| No. | Pos. | Nation | Player |
|---|---|---|---|
| — | MF | ROU | Bruno Vasiu (to Free agent) |
| — | FW | LTU | Deivydas Matulevičius (to Free agent) |

=== Dunărea Călărași ===
In:

| No. | Pos. | Nation | Player |
|---|---|---|---|
| — | MF | ROU | Baudouin Kanda (from Concordia Chiajna) |
| — | MF | ROU | Cristian Pușcaș (from Turris Turnu Măgurele) |
| — | MF | ROU | Luca Tache (on loan from Dinamo II București) |

Out:

| No. | Pos. | Nation | Player |
|---|---|---|---|
| — | MF | ROU | Adrian Zaluschi (to Minaur Baia Mare) |

=== Farul Constanța ===
In:

| No. | Pos. | Nation | Player |
|---|---|---|---|
| — | DF | ROU | Marius Savu (from Vedița Colonești) |
| — | MF | ROU | Liviu Mihai (from Turris Turnu Măgurele) |
| — | FW | MDA | Ilie Damașcan (from Turris Turnu Măgurele) |
| — | FW | ROU | Vlad Rusu (from Turris Turnu Măgurele) |

Out:

| No. | Pos. | Nation | Player |
|---|---|---|---|
| — | GK | ROU | Andrei Udeanu (to Free agent) |
| — | DF | ROU | Viorel Lică (to Petrolul Ploiești) |
| — | MF | ROU | Denis Hordouan (to Free agent) |

=== FC U Craiova ===
In:

| No. | Pos. | Nation | Player |
|---|---|---|---|
| — | GK | ROU | Mario Enache (loan return from Filiași) |
| — | DF | ROU | Denis Ispas (from Turris Turnu Măgurele) |
| — | FW | COD | Arsène Luboya (from Comuna Recea) |
| — | FW | ROU | Adrian Voicu (from Turris Turnu Măgurele) |

Out:

| No. | Pos. | Nation | Player |
|---|---|---|---|
| — | MF | ROU | Alexandru Munteanu (loan return to Voluntari II) |
| — | DF | ROU | Marius Avram (to Free agent) |
| — | DF | ROU | Radu Criștiu (to Free agent) |
| — | MF | ROU | Ionuț Tănase (to Șoimii Lipova) |

=== Metaloglobus București ===
In:

| No. | Pos. | Nation | Player |
|---|---|---|---|
| — | MF | AUT | Manuel Botic (from Petrolul Ploiești) |
| — | FW | ANG | Aguinaldo (from (Portugal) Real) |
| — | FW | ROU | Alexandru Potecea (from Tunari) |

Out:

| No. | Pos. | Nation | Player |
|---|---|---|---|
| — | GK | ROU | Iulian Răduță (to Free agent) |

=== Miercurea Ciuc ===
In:

| No. | Pos. | Nation | Player |

Out:

| No. | Pos. | Nation | Player |
|---|---|---|---|
| — | MF | ESP | Eder González (to Sepsi OSK Sfântu Gheorghe) |
| — | MF | ROU | Norbert János (to Free agent) |

=== Mioveni ===
In:

| No. | Pos. | Nation | Player |
|---|---|---|---|
| — | GK | ROU | Răzvan Ducan (on loan from FCSB, previously on loan at Turris Turnu Măgurele) |
| — | MF | ROU | Andrei Panait (from Argeș Pitești) |
| — | MF | ROU | Marian Șerban (on loan from Universitatea Craiova, previously on loan at Academica Clinceni) |
| — | FW | ROU | Ștefan Blănaru (from Turris Turnu Măgurele) |

Out:

| No. | Pos. | Nation | Player |
|---|---|---|---|
| — | GK | ROU | Valentin Sima (on loan to Știința Miroslava) |
| — | DF | ROU | Andrei Trașcu (on loan to Unirea Slobozia) |
| — | MF | ROU | Fabrizio Constantin (loan return to Unirea Bascov) |
| — | MF | ROU | André Cozma (loan return to Argeș Pitești) |
| — | MF | ROU | Laurențiu Marinescu (to Free agent) |
| — | MF | ISR | Eitan Velblum (to Free agent) |
| — | FW | ROU | Sergiu Negruț (to Free agent) |

=== Pandurii Târgu Jiu ===
In:

| No. | Pos. | Nation | Player |

Out:

| No. | Pos. | Nation | Player |
|---|---|---|---|
| — | DF | ROU | Andrei Gal (to Free agent) |

=== Petrolul Ploiești ===
In:

| No. | Pos. | Nation | Player |
|---|---|---|---|
| — | DF | ROU | Ștefan Bărboianu (from Turris Turnu Măgurele) |
| — | MF | ROU | Vlad Mitrea (on loan from Sepsi OSK Sfântu Gheorghe) |
| — | MF | ROU | Romario Moise (on loan from Astra Giurgiu) |
| — | MF | ROU | Silviu Pană (from Turris Turnu Măgurele) |
| — | FW | ROU | Sergiu Arnăutu (from Concordia Chiajna) |

Out:

| No. | Pos. | Nation | Player |
|---|---|---|---|
| — | MF | ROU | Răzvan Matiș (loan return to Viitorul Constanța) |
| — | MF | ARG | Bryan Mendoza (loan return to Botoșani) |
| — | DF | BEL | Joeri Poelmans (to Free agent) |
| — | DF | ROU | Andrei Răuță (to Free agent) |
| — | MF | AUT | Manuel Botic (to Metaloglobus București) |
| — | MF | ROU | Mihai Nițescu (to Free agent) |
| — | FW | CMR | Steve Beleck (to Free agent) |

=== Rapid București ===
In:

| No. | Pos. | Nation | Player |
|---|---|---|---|
| — | GK | ROU | Horațiu Moldovan (from UTA Arad) |
| — | DF | ROU | Luca Florică (from Hermannstadt) |
| — | DF | CRO | Ivica Žunić (from CFR Cluj) |
| — | MF | ROU | Bogdan Barbu (from Universitatea Cluj) |
| — | FW | LBR | Emmanuel Ernest (from Sporting Roșiori) |
| — | FW | ROU | Alexandru Ioniță (from UTA Arad) |
| — | FW | ROU | Octavian Ursu (from UTA Arad) |

Out:

| No. | Pos. | Nation | Player |
|---|---|---|---|
| — | DF | ROU | Bogdan Manole (to Concordia Chiajna) |
| — | DF | ROU | Radu Crișan (loan return to Astra Giurgiu) |
| — | MF | ROU | Alin Fică (loan return to CFR Cluj, later on loan at Comuna Recea) |
| — | MF | ROU | Alexandru Dulca (to Free agent) |
| — | FW | ROU | Alexandru Pop (to Minaur Baia Mare) |
| — | FW | ROU | Cătălin Țîră (to (Lithuania) Sūduva) |

=== Ripensia Timișoara ===
In:

| No. | Pos. | Nation | Player |

Out:

| No. | Pos. | Nation | Player |
|---|---|---|---|
| — | GK | ROU | Haralambie Mociu (to UTA Arad) |
| — | GK | ROU | George Păduraru (to ASU Politehnica Timișoara) |
| — | DF | ROU | Alin Burdeț (to Free agent) |
| — | DF | ROU | Adrian Neacșu (to Free agent) |
| — | MF | ROU | Cosmin Sârbu (to Free agent) |

=== SCM Gloria Buzău ===
In:

| No. | Pos. | Nation | Player |

Out:

| No. | Pos. | Nation | Player |

=== Slatina ===
In:

| No. | Pos. | Nation | Player |

Out:

| No. | Pos. | Nation | Player |

=== Turris Turnu Măgurele ===
In:

| No. | Pos. | Nation | Player |

Out:

| No. | Pos. | Nation | Player |
|---|---|---|---|
| — | GK | ROU | Răzvan Ducan (loan return to FCSB, later on loan to Mioveni) |
| — | DF | ROU | Alexandru Sima (loan return to Viitorul Constanța, later on loan at CSM Reșița) |
| — | MF | ROU | Florian Haită (loan return to Viitorul Constanța) |
| — | FW | ROU | Adrian Niță (loan return to Viitorul Constanța) |
| — | DF | ROU | Ștefan Bărboianu (to Petrolul Ploiești) |
| — | DF | ROU | Florinel Mitrea (to Chindia Târgoviște) |
| — | DF | ROU | Cătălin Pîrvulescu (to Viitorul Târgu Jiu) |
| — | DF | ROU | Denis Ispas (to FC U Craiova) |
| — | DF | ROU | Bogdan Matei (to Minaur Baia Mare) |
| — | DF | ROU | Alexandru Sălcianu (to CSM Reșița) |
| — | MF | ROU | Alin Buleică (to Viitorul Târgu Jiu) |
| — | MF | ROU | Liviu Mihai (to Farul Constanța) |
| — | MF | ROU | Silviu Pană (to Petrolul Ploiești) |
| — | MF | ROU | Cristian Pușcaș (to Dunărea Călărași) |
| — | MF | ROU | Alin Țegle (to Viitorul Târgu Jiu) |
| — | FW | ROU | Ștefan Blănaru (to Mioveni) |
| — | FW | MDA | Ilie Damașcan (to Farul Constanța) |
| — | FW | ROU | Vlad Rusu (to Farul Constanța) |
| — | FW | ROU | Adrian Voicu (to FC U Craiova) |
| — | FW | ROU | Albert Voinea (to UTA Arad) |

=== Unirea Slobozia ===
In:

| No. | Pos. | Nation | Player |
|---|---|---|---|
| — | GK | ROU | Denis Ciofu (on loan from Politehnica Iași) |
| — | DF | ROU | Andrei Trașcu (on loan from Mioveni) |
| — | MF | CMR | Christ Afalna (on loan from Șomuz Fălticeni) |
| — | MF | ROU | Marius Ciobanu (from Academica Clinceni) |
| — | MF | ROU | Bogdan Vasile (from ASU Politehnica Timișoara) |

Out:

| No. | Pos. | Nation | Player |
|---|---|---|---|
| — | DF | ROU | Adrian Stoianovici (loan return to UTA Arad) |
| — | FW | ROU | Radu Pocol (loan return to Viitorul II Constanța) |
| — | GK | ROU | George Tudor (to Dacia Unirea Brăila) |
| — | DF | ROU | Flavius Dumbrăveanu (to Free agent) |
| — | MF | ROU | Alexandru Chebac (to Free agent) |
| — | MF | ROU | Ricardo Mihalache (to Free agent) |
| — | MF | ROU | Daniel Unguru (to Free agent) |
| — | FW | ROU | Alexandru Muscă (to Free agent) |

=== Universitatea Cluj ===
In:

| No. | Pos. | Nation | Player |
|---|---|---|---|
| — | MF | ALB | Donaldo Açka (from Politehnica Iași) |
| — | FW | ARG | Lucas Chacana (from Politehnica Iași) |
| — | FW | NGR | Derick Ogbu (from Free agent) |

Out:

| No. | Pos. | Nation | Player |
|---|---|---|---|
| — | MF | ROU | Bogdan Barbu (to Rapid București) |
| — | MF | ROU | George Florescu (to Free agent) |
| — | MF | ISR | Yaniv Segev (on loan to Aerostar Bacău) |
| — | MF | ROU | Șerban Tîrlă (on loan to Minaur Baia Mare, previously on loan to Aerostar Bacău) |
| — | FW | ROU | Dorin Goga (Retired) |

=== Viitorul Târgu Jiu ===
In:

| No. | Pos. | Nation | Player |
|---|---|---|---|
| — | DF | ROU | Cătălin Pîrvulescu (from Turris Turnu Măgurele) |
| — | MF | ROU | Alin Buleică (from Turris Turnu Măgurele) |
| — | MF | ROU | Alin Țegle (from Turris Turnu Măgurele) |

Out:

| No. | Pos. | Nation | Player |
