= Andrei Iana =

Romanian professional footballer

Personal information
- Full name: Andrei Cristian Iana
- Date of birth: 31 January 2002 (age 24)
- Place of birth: Râmnicu Vâlcea, Romania
- Height: 1.70 m (5 ft 7 in)
- Position: Defender

Team information
- Current team: Mioveni
- Number: 2

Youth career
- 2012–2016: Hidro Râmnicu Vâlcea
- 2017: Râmnicu Vâlcea
- 2018: FCSB
- 2018–2019: Universitatea Craiova

Senior career*
Years	Team	Apps	(Gls)
2019–2021	Universitatea Craiova	0	(0)
2019–2020	→ Cetate Deva (loan)	12	(0)
2020–2021	→ Slatina (loan)	10	(0)
2021	CSM Reșița	1	(0)
2022	Academica Clinceni	11	(0)
2022–2023	Deva		
2023–	Mioveni		

International career
2018	Romania U16	3	(3)
2018	Romania U17	6	(0)
2019–2020	Romania U18	4	(1)
2021	Romania U19	1	(0)
- * Club domestic league appearances and goals as of 19:30, 19 September 2023 (UTC)

Andrei Cristian Iana (born 31 January 2002) is a Romanian professional footballer who plays as a defender for Liga II side CS Mioveni. In his career, Iana also played for teams such as Cetate Deva, CSM Slatina or CSM Reșița.
