= Nini Popescu =

Romanian footballer

Personal information
- Full name: Nini Adrian Popescu
- Date of birth: 26 April 1994 (age 32)
- Place of birth: Ploiești, Romania
- Height: 1.65 m (5 ft 5 in)
- Position: Midfielder

Team information
- Current team: Plopeni
- Number: 10

Youth career
- –2013: Petrolul Ploiești

Senior career*
| Years | Team | Apps | (Gls) |
| 2013–2014 | Petrolul Ploiești | 0 | (0) |
| 2013 | → Unirea Slobozia (loan) | 4 | (0) |
| 2014 | → CSM Câmpina (loan) | | |
| 2014–2016 | Gloria Buzău | 49 | (5) |
| 2017–2019 | Petrolul Ploiești | 76 | (8) |
| 2019–2020 | Argeș Pitești | 23 | (4) |
| 2020–2021 | CSM Reșița | 16 | (2) |
| 2021–2022 | Concordia Chiajna | 21 | (2) |
| 2022 | Gloria Bistrița | 10 | (0) |
| 2023 | 1599 Șelimbăr | 8 | (0) |
| 2023–2024 | Păulești | 26 | (3) |
| 2024– | Plopeni | 15 | (3) |
- * Club domestic league appearances and goals as of 19:04, 27 December 2024 (UTC)

Nini Adrian Popescu (born 26 April 1994) is a Romanian professional footballer who plays as a midfielder for Liga III side CSO Plopeni. In his career, Popescu also played for teams such as: Petrolul Ploiești, Unirea Slobozia, Gloria Buzău or FC Argeș Pitești, among others.

== Honours ==
Petrolul Ploiești

- Liga IV - Prahova County: 2016–17
- Liga III: 2017–18
