= Soufiane Jebari =

Spanish footballer (born 1995)

Personal information
- Full name: Soufiane Jebari Jebari
- Date of birth: 24 February 1995 (age 31)
- Place of birth: Barcelona, Spain
- Height: 1.75 m (5 ft 9 in)
- Positions: Attacking midfielder; forward

Team information
- Current team: FK Csíkszereda
- Number: 10

Youth career
- –2012: Vilassar de Mar
- 2012–2014: Damm

Senior career*
| Years | Team | Apps | (Gls) |
| 2014–2016 | Girona B | 14 | (1) |
| 2016–2017 | Llagostera | 2 | (0) |
| 2016–2017 | Llagostera B | 5 | (3) |
| 2017 | → FK Csíkszereda (loan) | | |
| 2017–2019 | FK Csíkszereda | | |
| 2020 | UTA Arad | 4 | (0) |
| 2020– | FK Csíkszereda | 140 | (17) |
- * Club domestic league appearances and goals as of 24 October 2026

Soufiane Jebari Jebari (Arabic: جباري سفيان; born 24 February 1995) is a Spanish professional footballer who plays as an attacking midfielder or as a forward for Liga I club FK Csíkszereda.

== Club career ==
Born in Barcelona, Jebari started playing football at local Vilassar de Mar. Before joining Girona B in 2014, he spent his last two junior years at Damm. He made his senior debut at Girona B in the Primera Catalana. He started the 2016–2017 season at the Segunda División B club Llagostera, but he was mainly used in the reserve team playing in the Primera Catalana.

In the 2017 January transfer window he was loaned to Romanian Liga III club FK Csíkszereda, the deal being made permanent in the following summer. He helped the team promote to Liga 2 in the 2018–19 season, but he and the club have terminated their contract by mutual consent in November 2019. Jebari joined UTA Arad in January 2020. The club promoted to Liga I later the same season, but Jebari was released before the start of the 2020–21 Liga I season.

He returned to FK Csíkszereda in October 2020. In the 2024–25 season he helped the club to promote once again, this time to Liga I, the highest tier of the Romanian football league system.

== Personal life ==
Born in Spain, Jebari is of Moroccan ethnicity.

== Honours ==
FK Csíkszereda

- Liga III: 2018–19

UTA Arad

- Liga II: 2019–20
