= André Cozma =

Romanian footballer

Personal information
- Full name: André José Cozma
- Date of birth: 30 November 2002 (age 23)
- Place of birth: Cadalso de los Vidrios, Spain
- Height: 1.87 m (6 ft 2 in)
- Position: Midfielder

Team information
- Current team: Știința Miroslava
- Number: 9

Senior career*
Years	Team	Apps	(Gls)
2019–2020	Hușana Huși	8	(5)
2020–2023	Argeș Pitești	2	(0)
2020	→ Mioveni (loan)	1	(0)
2021–2022	→ Hușana Huși (loan)	19	(5)
2022–2023	CSM Bacău	23	(6)
2023–2024	Foresta Suceava	13	(3)
2024–	Știința Miroslava	0	(0)
- * Club domestic league appearances and goals as of 14:01, 12 November 2024 (UTC)

André José Cozma (born 30 November 2002) is a Romanian professional footballer who plays as a midfielder for Știința Miroslava.
