= Tomás Díaz =

Argentine professional footballer

Personal information
- Date of birth: 24 April 1997 (age 29)
- Place of birth: Argentina
- Height: 1.78 m (5 ft 10 in)
- Position: Forward

Team information
- Current team: San Miguel

Youth career
- Independiente

Senior career*
Years	Team	Apps	(Gls)
2018–2020	Barracas Central	8	(1)
2019	→ Atlanta (loan)	0	(0)
2020–2021	Sepsi OSK	11	(0)
2020–2021	→ Chindia Târgoviște (loan)	14	(0)
2021	Talleres RdE	12	(1)
2022–2024	Deportivo Merlo	67	(2)
2024	Comunicaciones	19	(4)
2025	Anzoátegui	16	(2)
2025–2026	Zamora	18	(0)
2026–	San Miguel	9	(0)
- * Club domestic league appearances and goals as of 18:10, 5 May 2026 (UTC)

Tomás Díaz (born 24 April 1997) is an Argentine professional footballer who plays as a forward for San Miguel.

== Career ==
Díaz came through the youth ranks of Independiente. He moved to Barracas Central in 2018, subsequently appearing in Primera B Metropolitana for his professional debut on 25 August versus Almirante Brown; he came off the bench, as he did days later against Defensores Unidos. Díaz made his first start on 2 September in a victory over Justo José de Urquiza, with the forward also scoring the opening goal of a 1–2 win.

=== Sepsi OSK Sfântu Gheorghe ===
On 29 January 2020, Díaz signed a one-and-a-half-year contract with Romanian club Sepsi OSK.

== Career statistics ==
As of match played 24 October 2020

Appearances and goals by club, season and competition
Club	Season	League			Cup		League Cup		Continental		Other		Total	
Club	Season	Division	Apps	Goals	Apps	Goals	Apps	Goals	Apps	Goals	Apps	Goals	Apps	Goals
Barracas Central	2018–19	Primera B Metropolitana	8	1	0	0	—		—		0	0	8	1
Sepsi OSK	2019–20	Liga I	11	0	3	0	—		—		—		14	0
Chindia Târgoviște (loan)	2020–21	Liga I	5	0	0	0	—		—		—		5	0
Career total			24	1	3	0	—		—		0	0	27	1

== Honours ==
Barracas Central

- Primera B Metropolitana: 2018–19
