= Robert Candrea =

Romanian footballer

Personal information
- Full name: Robert Dumitru Candrea
- Date of birth: 3 February 1995 (age 31)
- Place of birth: Vatra Dornei, Romania
- Height: 1.85 m (6 ft 1 in)
- Position: Midfielder

Youth career
- –2013: FCM Târgu Mureș

Senior career*
Years	Team	Apps	(Gls)
2013–2017	ASA Târgu Mureș	50	(5)
2018	Olimpia Grudziądz	9	(0)
2018–2019	CSM Târgu Mureș	11	(16)
2019–2020	SCM Gloria Buzău	5	(0)
2020	Dunărea Călărași	2	(0)
- * Club domestic league appearances and goals

Robert Candrea (born 3 February 1995) is a Romanian former professional footballer who played as a midfielder.

On 19 January 2018, he signed a contract with Olimpia Grudziądz, which expired on 1 July 2018.

== Honours ==
ASA Târgu Mureș

- Romanian Supercup: 2015

CSM Târgu Mureș

- Liga IV – Mureș County: 2018–19
