= Marian Șerban =

Romanian footballer

Personal information
- Full name: Marian Cristinel Șerban
- Date of birth: 7 July 2000 (age 26)
- Place of birth: Craiova, Romania
- Height: 1.76 m (5 ft 9 in)
- Position: Midfielder

Youth career
- 2015–2019: Universitatea Craiova

Senior career*
Years	Team	Apps	(Gls)
2018–2023	Universitatea Craiova	1	(0)
2019–2020	→ Mioveni (loan)	34	(1)
2020	→ Academica Clinceni (loan)	4	(1)
2021	→ Mioveni (loan)	11	(0)
2021–2022	→ Chindia Târgoviște (loan)	13	(0)
2022–2023	→ CSM Slatina (loan)	10	(0)
2023–2024	CSU Alba Iulia		
2024–2025	Chindia Târgoviște	9	(0)
2025–2026	Tunari	9	(0)

International career
2017	Romania U17	1	(0)
2017–2018	Romania U18	4	(0)
2018–2019	Romania U19	5	(0)
2021	Romania U21	2	(0)
- * Club domestic league appearances and goals as of 13 December 2025

Marian Cristinel Șerban (born 7 July 2000) is a Romanian professional footballer who plays as a midfielder.

== Honours ==
Tunari

- Liga III: 2024–25
