= Mihai Cotolan =

Romanian footballer

Personal information
- Full name: Mihai Ionuț Cotolan
- Date of birth: 18 January 1999 (age 27)
- Place of birth: Ploiesti, Romania
- Height: 1.80 m (5 ft 11 in)
- Position: Goalkeeper

Team information
- Current team: Viitorul Dăești
- Number: 12

Youth career
- –2017: Dinamo București

Senior career*
Years	Team	Apps	(Gls)
2017–2018	Sportul Snagov	0	(0)
2018–2020	Pandurii Târgu Jiu	38	(0)
2020–2021	Voluntari	1	(0)
2021–2022	Astra Giurgiu	8	(0)
2022–2023	Viitorul Dăești	0	(0)
- * Club domestic league appearances and goals as of 07:59, 22 June 2022 (UTC)

Mihai Ionuț Cotolan (born 18 January 1999) is a Romanian professional footballer who plays as a goalkeeper for Viitorul Dăești.

== Club career ==
=== Voluntari ===
Cotolan played his first official game in Liga I in 2020, in a 3–3 draw against Academica Clinceni.

== Personal life ==
Mihai has a twin brother, Nicolae, who plays as centre back for CS Blejoi and also he is the younger brother of Bogdan Cotolan.
