= Cătălin Barbu =

Romanian footballer

Personal information
- Full name: Cătălin Constantin Barbu
- Date of birth: 5 August 1999 (age 27)
- Place of birth: Pitești, Romania
- Position: Forward

Youth career
- 2009–2017: Argeș Pitești

Senior career*
Years	Team	Apps	(Gls)
2017–2019	Argeș Pitești	47	(8)
2019–2020	Chindia Târgoviște	8	(0)
2020–2022	Argeș Pitești	6	(0)
2022	Crișul Chișineu-Criș	15	(9)
2023–2024	Vedița Colonești	14	(7)
- * Club domestic league appearances and goals as of 13:00, 21 December 2024 (UTC)

Cătălin Constantin Barbu (born 5 August 1999) is a Romanian professional footballer who plays as a forward. Barbu started his career at FC Argeș Pitești, club for which he played in more than 50 league and cup games.

== Personal life ==
Cătălin Barbu is the son of former footballer Constantin "Jean" Barbu. Jean Barbu played for teams such as FC Argeș Pitești, Suwon Samsung Bluewings, FC Rapid București or CD Numancia.
