= Eder González =

Spanish professional footballer

Personal information
- Full name: Eder González Tortella
- Date of birth: 7 January 1997 (age 29)
- Place of birth: Palma, Spain
- Height: 1.70 m (5 ft 7 in)
- Position: Midfielder

Team information
- Current team: Asteras Tripolis
- Number: 10

Youth career
- –2016: RCD Mallorca

Senior career*
Years	Team	Apps	(Gls)
2016–2017	RCD Mallorca B	0	(0)
2016–2017	→ Cornellà (loan)	0	(0)
2017	Terrassa	4	(0)
2017–2020	FK Csíkszereda	84	(17)
2021–2022	Sepsi OSK	65	(3)
2022–2025	Atromitos	76	(3)
2025–	Asteras Tripolis	42	(1)
- * Club domestic league appearances and goals as of 20 September 2026

Eder González Tortella (born 7 January 1997) is a Spanish professional footballer who plays as a midfielder for Greek Super League club Asteras Tripolis.

== Career statistics ==
=== Club ===
As of match played 19 May 2022

Appearances and goals by club, season and competition
Club	Season	League			National Cup		League Cup		Continental		Other		Total	
Club	Season	Division	Apps	Goals	Apps	Goals	Apps	Goals	Apps	Goals	Apps	Goals	Apps	Goals
Mallorca B	2016–17	Segunda División B	0	0	0	0	—		—		—		0	0
Cornellà (loan)	2016–17	Segunda División B	0	0	1	0	—		—		—		1	0
Terrassa	2016–17	Tercera División	4	0	0	0	—		—		—		4	0
FK Csíkszereda	2017–18	Liga III	24	7	1	0	—		—		—		25	7
FK Csíkszereda	2018–19	Liga III	29	7	4	0	—		—		—		33	7
FK Csíkszereda	2019–20	Liga II	19	2	3	0	—		—		—		22	2
FK Csíkszereda	2020–21	Liga II	12	1	3	0	—		—		—		15	1
FK Csíkszereda	Total		84	17	11	0	—		—		—		95	17
Sepsi OSK	2020–21	Liga I	23	2	0	0	—		—		—		23	2
Sepsi OSK	2021–22	Liga I	35	1	5	0	—		2	0	—		42	1
Sepsi OSK	Total		58	3	5	0	—		2	0	—		65	3
Career total			146	20	17	0	0	0	2	0	0	0	165	20

== Honours ==
FK Csíkszereda

- Liga III: 2018–19

Sepsi OSK

- Cupa României: 2021–22
