= Daniel Toma =

Romanian footballer

Personal information
- Full name: Daniel Marian Toma
- Date of birth: 22 April 2000 (age 26)
- Place of birth: Bucharest, Romania
- Height: 1.74 m (5 ft 9 in)
- Position: Defensive midfielder

Team information
- Current team: Volunari
- Number: 7

Youth career
- –2019: FCSB

Senior career*
Years	Team	Apps	(Gls)
2018–2023	FCSB	0	(0)
2019–2020	→ Farul Constanta (loan)	24	(2)
2020–2023	→ Mioveni (loan)	71	(0)
2023–2024	Mioveni	27	(1)
2024–	Volunari	49	(0)

International career
2018–2019	Romania U19	7	(0)
2021	Romania U21	1	(0)
- * Club domestic league appearances and goals as of 12 May 2026

Daniel Marian Toma (born 22 April 2000) footballer who plays as a defensive midfielder for Liga II club Volunari.

== Career statistics ==
As of match played 1 June 2026

Appearances and goals by club, season and competition
Club	Season	League			Cupa României		Europe		Other		Total	
Club	Season	Division	Apps	Goals	Apps	Goals	Apps	Goals	Apps	Goals	Apps	Goals
FCSB	2018–19	Liga I	0	0	1	0	0	0	—		1	0
Farul Constanta (loan)	2018–19	Liga II	9	1	—		—		—		9	1
Farul Constanta (loan)	2019–20	Liga II	15	1	0	0	—		—		15	1
Farul Constanta (loan)	Total		24	2	0	0	—		—		24	2
Mioveni (loan)	2020–21	Liga II	24	0	1	0	—		2 (Note: Appearances in Liga I promotion/relegation play-offs)	0	27	0
Mioveni (loan)	2021–22	Liga I	25	0	0	0	—		—		25	0
Mioveni (loan)	2022–23	Liga I	22	0	4	0	—		—		26	0
Mioveni	2023–24	Liga II	27	1	2	0	—		2	0	31	1
Mioveni	Total		98	1	7	0	—		4	0	109	1
Voluntari	2024–25	Liga II	27	0	1	0	—		2	0	30	0
Voluntari	2025–26	Liga II	22	0	1	0	—		2	0	25	0
Voluntari	Total		49	0	2	0	—		4	0	55	0
Career total			170	3	10	0	0	0	8	0	188	3
