= Flavius Croitoru =

Romanian footballer

Personal information
- Full name: Flavius Dănuț Croitoru
- Date of birth: 13 July 1992 (age 34)
- Place of birth: Pitești, Romania
- Height: 1.86 m (6 ft 1 in)
- Position: Goalkeeper

Team information
- Current team: Chindia Târgoviște
- Number: 1

Youth career
- 2002–2006: LPS Pitești
- 2007–2011: Argeș Pitești

Senior career*
Years	Team	Apps	(Gls)
2011–2013	Argeș Pitești	35	(0)
2013–2020	Mioveni	119	(0)
2020–2022	Argeș Pitești	11	(0)
2022–2024	Mioveni	45	(0)
2025	Voluntari	0	(0)
2025–	Chindia Târgoviște	2	(0)
- * Club domestic league appearances and goals as of 26 April 2025

Flavius Dănuț Croitoru (born 13 July 1992) is a Romanian professional footballer who plays as a goalkeeper for Liga II club Chindia Târgoviște.
