= Alexandru Piftor =

Romanian footballer

Personal information
- Date of birth: 9 May 1999 (age 27)
- Place of birth: Botoșani, Romania
- Height: 1.80 m (5 ft 11 in)
- Position: Midfielder

Youth career
- CSȘ Botoșani
- –2017: Botoșani

Senior career*
Years	Team	Apps	(Gls)
2017–2020	Botoșani	4	(0)
2020	→ Chindia Târgoviște (loan)	5	(0)
2020–2022	Gloria Buzau	10	(0)
2021–2022	→ Ripensia Timișoara (loan)	35	(3)
2022–2023	Ripensia Timișoara	13	(2)
2023	Dumbrăvița	9	(2)
2023	Unirea Dej	14	(3)
2024–	Botoșani	0	(0)
- * Club domestic league appearances and goals as of 11 January 2024

Alexandru Piftor (born 9 May 1999) is a Romanian professional footballer who plays as a midfielder for Liga I club Botoșani.
