= Dragoș Penescu =

Romanian footballer (born 2000)

Personal information
- Full name: Dragoș Alexandru Penescu
- Date of birth: 24 February 2000 (age 26)
- Place of birth: Ploiești, Romania
- Height: 1.75 m (5 ft 9 in)
- Position: Central midfielder

Youth career
- 2005–2011: Petrolul 95 Ploiești
- 2011–2013: Gheorghe Hagi Academy
- 2013–2016: Petrolul Ploiești
- 2016–2017: CNP Târgu Mureș
- 2018–2020: Botoșani
- 2020: → Universitatea Cluj (loan)
- 2020–2021: Dinamo București

Senior career*
Years	Team	Apps	(Gls)
2017–2018	Sportul Snagov	3	(0)
2018–2020	Botoșani	1	(0)
2020–2022	Dinamo București	0	(0)
- * Club domestic league appearances and goals as of 30 April 2021

Dragoș Alexandru Penescu (born 24 February 2000) is a Romanian professional footballer who plays as a central midfielder.

== Playing career ==
Penescu made his debut in Liga I on 31 May 2019, for FC Botoșani, in a game against Politehnica Iași.
