= Steven Goma =

French footballer (born 2001)

Personal information
- Full name: Steven Rick Ruben Goma
- Date of birth: 15 November 2001 (age 24)
- Place of birth: Roissy-en-Brie, France
- Height: 1.83 m (6 ft 0 in)
- Position: Forward

Youth career
- 2013–2015: US Roissy
- 2015–2017: Bussy-Saint-Georges
- 2017–2020: US Roissy

Senior career*
Years	Team	Apps	(Gls)
2020–2021	Pandurii Târgu Jiu	15	(1)
2021–2022	Academica Clinceni	7	(0)
- * Club domestic league appearances and goals as of 2 October 2022

Steven Rick Ruben Goma (born 15 November 2001) is a French professional footballer who plays as a forward. Goma grew up in France, at US Roissy and Bussy-Saint-Georges and at senior level, he also played for Pandurii Târgu Jiu.
