= Caius Lungu =

Romanian footballer (1989–2025)

Personal information
- Full name: Caius Adrian Lungu
- Date of birth: 2 June 1989
- Place of birth: Timișoara, Romania
- Date of death: 23 July 2025 (aged 36)
- Place of death: Timișoara, Romania
- Height: 1.76 m (5 ft 9 in)
- Positions: Right-back; right midfielder

Youth career
- 1999–2008: CSȘ Timișoara

Senior career*
Years	Team	Apps	(Gls)
2008–2009	ALTO Gradimento Albina		
2009–2010	Fortuna Covaci	22	(2)
2010–2013	Voința Sibiu	38	(0)
2013	Râmnicu Vâlcea	9	(0)
2013–2019	Colorno Calcio		
2019–2020	Ripensia Timișoara	21	(1)
2020–2021	CSM Reșița	11	(0)
2021–2023	Pobeda Stár Bišnov	0	(0)
2023–2025	Ripensia Timișoara	8	(0)
- * Club domestic league appearances and goals

Caius Adrian Lungu (2 June 1989 – 23 July 2025) was a Romanian footballer who played as a right-back or right midfielder. The first match in the Liga I was played for Voința Sibiu against Astra Ploiești. In his career, Lungu also played for teams such as Fortuna Covaci, CSM Râmnicu Vâlcea or Colorno Calcio. Lungu died from a heart attack on 23 July 2025, at the age of 36.
