= Ionuț Tănase =

Romanian footballer

Personal information
- Full name: Ionuț Georgian Tănase
- Date of birth: 9 January 1998 (age 28)
- Place of birth: Pitești, Romania
- Position: Midfielder

Team information
- Current team: Unirea Alba Iulia
- Number: 14

Youth career
- –2015: Atletico Arad

Senior career*
Years	Team	Apps	(Gls)
2015–2018	UTA Arad	78	(1)
2018	Gloria LT Cermei	15	(1)
2019–2021	FC U Craiova	29	(2)
2021	Mioveni	1	(0)
2021–2022	Crișul Chișineu-Criș	25	(1)
2022–2023	Dumbrăvița	39	(2)
2024	Gloria LT Cermei	12	(0)
2024–	Unirea Alba Iulia	0	(0)

International career
2014–2015	Romania U17	6	(0)
2016	Romania U19	1	(0)
- * Club domestic league appearances and goals as of 08:43, 8 November 2024 (UTC)

Ionuț Georgel Tănase (born 9 January 1998) is a Romanian professional footballer who plays as a midfielder for Liga III club Unirea Alba Iulia.

== International career ==
Tănase played for Romania U-17 in 4 matches.

== Honours ==
UTA Arad

- Liga III: 2015–16

FC U Craiova

- Liga III: 2019–20
