= Valentin Balint =

Romanian footballer (born 1994)

Personal information
- Full name: Valentin Daniel Balint
- Date of birth: 7 February 1994 (age 32)
- Place of birth: Bucharest, Romania
- Height: 1.82 m (6 ft 0 in)
- Position: Striker

Youth career
- –2005: Romprim București
- 2005–2011: Dinamo București

Senior career*
Years	Team	Apps	(Gls)
2012–2014	Dinamo II București	31	(4)
2013–2014	Dinamo București	5	(0)
2014	→ Corona Brașov	10	(0)
2014	Rapid București	5	(0)
2015	Ceahlăul Piatra Neamț	12	(1)
2016–2017	Dunărea Călărași	27	(4)
2018–2020	Mioveni	64	(22)
2020–2021	Petrolul Ploiești	17	(1)
2021	Concordia Chiajna	12	(0)

International career
2014	Romania U-21	2	(0)
- * Club domestic league appearances and goals as of 08:12, 26 January 2022 (UTC)

Valentin Daniel Balint (born 7 February 1994) is a Romanian professional footballer who plays as a striker. He started his professional career at Dinamo București. He is the nephew of former Romanian International footballer Dănuț Lupu.
