= Andrei Șendroiu =

Romanian footballer

Personal information
- Date of birth: 30 September 1995 (age 31)
- Place of birth: Târgu Jiu, Romania
- Height: 1.78 m (5 ft 10 in)
- Position: Midfielder

Youth career
- Pandurii Târgu Jiu

Senior career*
| Years | Team | Apps | (Gls) |
| 2013–2016 | Pandurii Târgu Jiu | 1 | (0) |
| 2013–2016 | → Pandurii II Târgu Jiu | 0 | (0) |
| 2016–2017 | Metalul Reșița | 3 | (0) |
| 2017–2020 | Pandurii Târgu Jiu | 37 | (0) |
| 2020–2021 | Filiași | 9 | (0) |
- * Club domestic league appearances and goals as of 30 April 2021

Andrei Șendroiu (born 30 September 1995) is a Romanian professional footballer who plays as a midfielder.
