= Radu Crișan =

Romanian footballer

Personal information
- Date of birth: 27 April 1996 (age 30)
- Place of birth: Turda, Romania
- Height: 1.97 m (6 ft 6 in)
- Position: Defender

Team information
- Current team: Voluntari
- Number: 27

Youth career
- 2003–2012: Universitatea Cluj

Senior career*
Years	Team	Apps	(Gls)
2012–2013	Petrolul Ploiești	0	(0)
2012	→ Conpet Ploiești (loan)	14	(1)
2013	→ CS Ștefănești (loan)	4	(1)
2013–2016	Universitatea Cluj	27	(2)
2014–2015	→ Arieșul Turda (loan)		
2016–2021	Astra Giurgiu	8	(0)
2016	→ Academica Clinceni (loan)	14	(2)
2017–2018	→ Hermannstadt (loan)	33	(3)
2019	→ Dunărea Călărași (loan)	18	(2)
2020	→ UTA Arad (loan)	1	(0)
2020	→ Rapid București (loan)	12	(2)
2021	→ Dunărea Călărași (loan)	4	(0)
2021–2024	1599 Șelimbăr	45	(2)
2024	Gloria Buzău	10	(0)
2024–	Voluntari	52	(2)

International career
2014	Romania U19	6	(0)
- * Club domestic league appearances and goals as of 24 October 2026

Radu Crișan (born 27 April 1996) is a Romanian professional footballer who plays as a defender for Liga I club Voluntari .

== Honours ==
Hermannstadt

- Cupa României runner-up: 2017–18

Astra Giurgiu

- Cupa României runner-up: 2018–19
- Supercupa României: 2016

UTA Arad

- Liga II: 2019–20
