= Bogdan Melinte =

Romanian footballer

Personal information
- Full name: Bogdan Gabriel Melinte
- Date of birth: 11 September 1998 (age 28)
- Place of birth: Botoșani, Romania
- Height: 1.74 m (5 ft 9 in)
- Position: Forward

Team information
- Current team: Dante Botoșani (on loan from Botoșani)
- Number: 69

Senior career*
Years	Team	Apps	(Gls)
2020–	Botoșani	1	(0)
2021	→ Minaur Baia Mare (loan)	5	(2)
2021–	→ Dante Botoșani (loan)	0	(0)
- * Club domestic league appearances and goals as of 17:26, 15 February 2022 (UTC)

Bogdan Gabriel Melinte (born 11 September 1998) is a Romanian professional footballer who plays as a forward for Liga III side Dante Botoșani, on loan from FC Botoșani.
