= Călin Popescu =

Romanian footballer

Personal information
- Date of birth: 15 November 2001 (age 24)
- Place of birth: Brașov, Romania
- Height: 1.75 m (5 ft 9 in)
- Position: Midfielder

Youth career
- –2018: FC Brașov
- 2018: Politehnica Timișoara

Senior career*
Years	Team	Apps	(Gls)
2017–2018	FC Brașov	1	(0)
2018	ASU Politehnica Timișoara	2	(0)
2019–2020	Sepsi OSK	5	(0)
2019	→ ASU Politehnica Timișoara (loan)	16	(0)
2020	UTA Arad	3	(0)
2021–2023	Hermannstadt	49	(3)
2023–2024	Othellos Athienou	13	(4)
2024	Volos	5	(0)

International career
2018	Romania U17	1	(0)
2019	Romania U19	4	(0)
- * Club domestic league appearances and goals as of 20 April 2024

Călin Popescu (Romanian pronunciation: [kəˈliŋ poˈpesku]; born 15 November 2001) is a Romanian professional footballer who plays as a midfielder.

== Honours ==
Sepsi OSK

- Cupa României runner-up: 2019–20
