= Dan Tălmaciu =

Romanian footballer

Personal information
- Full name: Dan Alexandru Tălmaciu
- Date of birth: 22 April 2002 (age 24)
- Place of birth: Bucharest, Romania
- Height: 1.89 m (6 ft 2 in)
- Position: Centre back

Team information
- Current team: Unirea Constanța (on loan from FCSB)
- Number: 26

Youth career
- 2012–2021: Dinamo București
- 2020–2021: → Politehnica Iași (loan)

Senior career*
Years	Team	Apps	(Gls)
2020–2021	Politehnica Iași	1	(0)
2021–	FCSB	0	(0)
2021–	→ Unirea Constanța (loan)	16	(1)
- * Club domestic league appearances and goals as of 29 October 2022 (UTC)

Dan Alexandru Tălmaciu (born 22 April 2002) is a Romanian professional footballer who plays as a defender for Unirea Constanța, on loan from FCSB. He came close to sign for West Ham United in January 2021, but nothing concrete has been achieved.

== Club career ==
=== Politehnica Iași ===
He made his Liga I debut for Politehnica Iași against Viitorul on 1 November 2020.

== Career statistics ==
=== Club ===
As of match played 29 October 2022

Appearances and goals by club, season and competition
Club	Season	League			National Cup (Note: Includes Cupa României)		Europe		Other (Note: Appearances in Supercupa României)		Total	
Club	Season	Division	Apps	Goals	Apps	Goals	Apps	Goals	Apps	Goals	Apps	Goals
Politehnica Iași (loan)	2020–21	Liga I	1	0	0	0	–		–		1	0
Unirea Constanța (loan)	2021–22	Liga II	12	1	–		–		–		12	1
Unirea Constanța (loan)	2022–23	Liga II	4	0	1	0	–		–		5	0
Unirea Constanța (loan)	Total		16	1	1	0	–	–	–	–	17	1
Career Total			17	1	1	0	–	–	–	–	18	1
