= Alexandru Zaharia (footballer, born 2000) =

Romanian footballer

Personal information
- Full name: Alexandru Iulian Zaharia
- Date of birth: 9 September 2000 (age 26)
- Place of birth: Iași, Romania
- Height: 1.78 m (5 ft 10 in)
- Position: Forward

Team information
- Current team: Cetatea Suceava
- Number: 9

Youth career
- Steaua Magică Iași
- –2017: Politehnica Iași

Senior career*
Years	Team	Apps	(Gls)
2017–2021	Politehnica Iași	20	(1)
2019	→ Ozana Târgu Neamț (loan)	12	(6)
2020	→ Aerostar Bacău (loan)	4	(0)
2022	Dante Botoșani	10	(2)
2022–2023	CSM Bacău	25	(3)
2023–2024	Sighetu Marmației	27	(9)
2024–2025	SCM Zalău	25	(4)
2025–	Cetatea Suceava	13	(6)
- * Club domestic league appearances and goals as of 12:06, 12 January 2026 (UTC)

Alexandru Iulian Zaharia (born 9 September 2000) is a Romanian professional footballer who plays as a forward for CSM Cetatea Suceava.

== Honours ==
=== Dante Botoșani ===
- Liga III: 2021–22
