= Ángel Bastos =

Spanish footballer

Personal information
- Full name: Ángel Bastos Teijeira
- Date of birth: 3 May 1992 (age 34)
- Place of birth: Mos, Spain
- Height: 1.70 m (5 ft 7 in)
- Position: Right back

Youth career
- 2008–2011: Porriño Industrial

Senior career*
Years	Team	Apps	(Gls)
2011–2013	Porriño Industrial		
2013–2014	Choco	35	(1)
2014–2016	Coruxo	59	(3)
2016–2018	Cultural Leonesa	55	(3)
2018–2019	Reus	20	(0)
2019–2020	Extremadura	44	(1)
2020–2021	Hermannstadt	6	(0)
2021–2022	Rayo Majadahonda	42	(0)
2022–2024	Pontevedra	60	(3)
2024–2025	Bergantiños	27	(0)
- * Club domestic league appearances and goals as of 1 July 2025

Ángel Bastos Teijeira (born 3 May 1992) is a Spanish footballer who plays as a right back.

== Football career ==
Bastos was born in Mos, Pontevedra, Spain, and started his career with Porriño Industrial FC. In July 2013 he joined Tercera División side CD Choco, being an ever-present figure as his side finished sixth.

On 5 July 2014, Bastos moved to Coruxo FC in Segunda División B. Again being a regular starter, he signed for fellow league team Cultural Leonesa on 20 June 2016.

Bastos appeared in all league matches of the 2016–17 season, scoring two goals as his side achieved promotion to Segunda División as champions. He made his professional debut on 26 August 2017, starting in a 2–1 home win against CA Osasuna.

On 21 June 2018, after suffering relegation, Bastos signed for CF Reus Deportiu still in the second division. The following January, he terminated his contract with the Catalans due to the club's poor financial situation overall.

On 28 January 2019, Bastos moved to fellow second division side Extremadura UD.

In August 2024, Bastos joined Bergantiños on a one-year deal.

== Honours ==
Cultural Leonesa

- Segunda División B: 2016–17
