= Joeri Poelmans =

Belgian footballer

Personal information
- Date of birth: 8 September 1995 (age 31)
- Place of birth: Sint-Truiden, Belgium
- Height: 1.78 m (5 ft 10 in)
- Position: Left back

Team information
- Current team: Houtvenne
- Number: 44

Youth career
- –2013: JMG Academy Lierse
- 2013–2014: Lierse

Senior career*
Years	Team	Apps	(Gls)
2014–2018	Lierse	52	(0)
2018–2020	Helmond Sport	61	(5)
2020–2021	Petrolul Ploiești	5	(0)
2021–2024	Lierse Kempenzonen	48	(2)
2024	Chania	0	(0)
2024–	Houtvenne	54	(2)
- * Club domestic league appearances and goals as of 3 May 2026

Joeri Poelmans (born 8 September 1995) is a Belgian footballer who plays as a left back for Belgian Division 1 club Houtvenne.

== Club career ==
On 22 April 2021, he signed a one-year contract with Lierse Kempenzonen.
