= CS Mioveni =

Football club in Mioveni, Romania

- Full name: Clubul Sportiv Mioveni
- Nicknames: Galben-verzii (The Yellow and Greens)
- Short name: Mioveni
- Founded: 2000 as AS Mioveni 2000
- Dissolved: 2025
- Ground: Orășenesc
- Capacity: 10,000
- Website: csmioveni.ro

Clubul Sportiv Mioveni (Romanian pronunciation: [ˌklubul sporˈtiv mi.oˈvenʲ]), commonly known as CS Mioveni or simply Mioveni, was a Romanian professional football club based in Mioveni, Argeș County.

The team was founded in 2000 as AS Mioveni and began playing the fourth division. The following year, it merged with nearby Dacia Pitești and took its berth in the Divizia C. The club made its first appearance in the top division in the 2007–08 campaign as Dacia Mioveni, and in 2010 settled on the current name of CS Mioveni.

"The Yellow and Greens" played their home matches at the Stadionul Orășenesc, which had a seating capacity of 10,000 persons.

== History ==
=== First years and ascension (2000–2011) ===
The club was founded in 2000 under the name AS Mioveni (Mioveni Sports Association). After one season in the Liga IV, AS Mioveni merged with Dacia Pitești in 2001 and took its place in the Liga III, while the club changed its name to AS Dacia Mioveni, only to change it soon after that to CS Dacia Mioveni (Dacia Mioveni Sports Club).

In its first season of division football, Dacia finished 3rd in the Liga III. The next season however, the team finished top of series IV of the Liga III and therefore, in the summer of 2003 they promoted to the Liga II where they activated for four years without any outstanding performance.

At the end of the 2006–07 season, Dacia Mioveni finished runner-up in the Liga II, Seria II, and promoted for the first time in history to the Liga I.

Dacia's best performance was the only appearance in the Liga I, in the 2007–08 season, when they finished 16th and were relegated. During the same season Dacia Mioveni reached the semi-finals of the Cupa României, being eliminated by CFR Cluj, after an impressive win in the quarterfinals against Dinamo București, with 1–0.

Period	Name
2000–2001	AS Mioveni 2000
2001–2010	Dacia Mioveni
2010–present	CS Mioveni

In the summer of 2010 the club was renamed, CS Mioveni being the new name. The club officials took this decision because Automobile Dacia refused to sponsor the club, instead sponsoring Italian club Udinese Calcio.

Even if the club had finished the 2010-11 Liga II season on the third position, the club promoted in the Liga I because the second placed FC Bihor Oradea had problems with the licence.

=== A second league constant and a new promotion (2011–present) ===
CS Mioveni relegated again in the Liga II at the end of the 2011–12 edition, after finishing on the bottom of the league, with only 12 points won in 34 rounds. After this season, "the yellow and greens" spent no less than 9 years in the antechamber of the Romanian top-flight, the team from Automobile Dacia's town becoming a classic of the Liga II. Most of the time, Mioveni was too good to relegate in the third tier, but not good enough to promote back in the first division. In these nine years, the club obtain the following rankings: 2nd (2014–15), 3rd (2019–20), 4th (2015–16, 2016–17), 7th (2018–19), 8th (2012–13, 2013–14) and 9th (2017–18).

Mioveni promoted back to the Liga I at the end of the 2020–21 season, when after a ranking on the 3rd place, they won the promotion/relegation play-offs (2–1 on aggregate) against top-flight club FC Hermannstadt.

== Ground ==
CS Mioveni plays its home games on Stadionul Orășenesc, a 10,000-seat arena, in downtown Mioveni. Between 2013 and 2015 the stadium was renovated and "the yellow and greens" played their home matches on Nicolae Dobrin Stadium in Pitești. Second team of the club, CS Mioveni II, also used to play its home matches on Colibași Stadium, stadium used also by the first team as a training ground.

== Support ==
CS Mioveni has never had many supporters in Argeș County, most of the public opting for much more familiar and successful FC Argeș. Over the time the club had sporadically an organized group of supporters, especially between 2006 and 2011, when the club was in the Liga I, twice and important rivalries with FC Argeș were born.

=== Rivalries ===
CS Mioveni does not have many important rivalries, the only important one is against FC Argeș Pitești, commonly known as Argeș Derby or the Derby of Argeș. In the past, Mioveni had also a local rivalry against Internațional Curtea de Argeș.

== Honours ==
=== Domestic ===
==== Leagues ====
- Liga II
  - Runners-up (2): 2006–07, 2014–15
  - Play-off Winners (1): 2020–21
- Liga III
  - Winners (1): 2002–03

==== Other performances ====
- Appearances in Liga I: 4
- Best finish in Liga I: 12th in 2021–22
- Place 75 of 101 teams in Liga I All-time table
- Semi-finalist of 2007–08 Cupa României

== Notable former players ==
The footballers enlisted below have had international cap(s) for their respective countries at junior and/or senior level and/or significant caps for CS Mioveni.

Romania

- (Romania) Liviu Antal
- (Romania) Ilie Baicu
- (Romania) Ionuț Balaur
- (Romania) Valentin Balint
- (Romania) Constantin Barbu
- (Romania) Ciprian Biceanu
- (Romania) Ștefan Blănaru
- (Romania) Ionuț Burnea
- (Romania) Alexandru Buziuc
- (Romania) Mihai Costea
- (Romania) Valentin Coșereanu
- (Romania) Flavius Croitoru
- (Romania) Nicolae Dică
- (Romania) Gabriel Enache
- (Romania) Eduard Florescu
- (Romania) Claudiu Ionescu
- (Romania) Laurențiu Marinescu
- (Romania) Andrei Mărgăritescu
- (Romania) Cosmin Năstăsie
- (Romania) Adrian Neaga
- (Romania) Robert Neagoe
- (Romania) Andrei Nilă
- (Romania) Dan Nistor
- (Romania) Dorinel Oancea
- (Romania) Mihai Olteanu
- (Romania) Octavian Popescu
- (Romania) Ionuț Rădescu
- (Romania) Alexandru Răuță
- (Romania) Bogdan Rusu
- (Romania) Adrian Scarlatache
- (Romania) Daniel Șerbănică
- (Romania) Cristian Tănase
- (Romania) Daniel Toma

Brazil

- (Brazil) Roberto Ayza
- (Brazil) Guilherme Garutti

Central African Republic

- (Central African Republic) (Romania) Ali Calvin Tolmbaye

== Notable former managers ==
- (Romania) Marian Pană (2011–2012)
- (Romania) Constantin Schumacher (2023–2024)
- (Romania) Constantin Cârstea
- (Romania) Sorin Cârțu
- (Romania) Iordan Eftimie
- (Romania) Florin Halagian
- (Romania) Florin Marin
- (Romania) Ion Moldovan
- (Romania) Claudiu Niculescu
- (Romania) Alexandru Pelici
- (Romania) Ionuț Popa
- (Romania) Laurențiu Roșu
- (Romania) Ilie Stan
- (Romania) Flavius Stoican
- (Romania) Mihai Stoichiță

== League history ==
Season	Tier	Division	Place	Cupa României
2024–25	2	Liga II	21st (R)	Third round
2023–24	2	Liga II	5th	Play-off round
2022–23	1	Liga I	16th (R)	Quarter-finals
2021–22	1	Liga I	12th	Round of 32
2020–21	2	Liga II	3rd (P)	Fourth Round
2019–20	2	Liga II	3rd	Round of 16
2018–19	2	Liga II	7th	Round of 16
2017–18	2	Liga II	9th	Round of 16
2016–17	2	Liga II	4th	Quarter-finals
2015–16	2	Liga II (Seria II)	4th	Round of 32
2014–15	2	Liga II (Seria II)	2nd	Quarter-finals
2013–14	2	Liga II (Seria II)	8th	Fourth Round
2012–13	2	Liga II (Seria II)	8th	Round of 32

Season	Tier	Division	Place	Cupa României
2011–12	1	Liga I	18th (R)	Round of 32
2010–11	2	Liga II (Seria II)	3rd (P)	Fourth Round
2009–10	2	Liga II (Seria II)	3rd	Round of 32
2008–09	2	Liga II (Seria II)	6th	Round of 32
2007–08	1	Liga I	16th (R)	Semi-finals
2006–07	2	Liga II (Seria II)	2nd (P)	
2005–06	2	Divizia B (Seria II)	8th	
2004–05	2	Divizia B (Seria II)	7th	
2003–04	2	Divizia B (Seria II)	3rd	Round of 32
2002–03	3	Divizia C (Seria IV)	1st (C, P)	
2001–02	3	Divizia C	3rd	
2000–01	3	Divizia C	6th	
