= List of Romanian football transfers summer 2019 =

This is a list of Romanian football transfers for the 2019–20 summer transfer window. Only moves featuring 2019–20 Liga I and 2019–20 Liga II are listed.

== Liga I ==
=== Academica Clinceni ===
In:

No.	Pos.	Nation	Player
—	GK	Portugal	Miguel Santos (on loan from Astra Giurgiu)
—	GK	Romania	Octavian Vâlceanu (from Viitorul Domnești, previously on loan)
—	DF	Greece	Okan Chatziterzoglou (from (Greece) Xanthi)
—	DF	Romania	Gabriel Matei (from Concordia Chiajna)
—	DF	Israel	Alon Netzer (from (Israel) Hapoel Nof HaGalil)
—	MF	Romania	Bogdan Barbu (from Viitorul Domnești, previously on loan)
—	MF	Romania	Laurențiu Buș (from Botoșani)
—	MF	Moldova	Eugeniu Cebotaru (from (Russia) Sibir Novosibirsk)
—	MF	Brazil	Jean Deretti (from (Slovakia) Senica)
—	MF	Romania	Cătălin Găină (from Viitorul Domnești, previously on loan)
—	MF	Romania	George Merloi (from (France) Rennes B)
—	MF	Netherlands	Oulad Omar (from (Netherlands) Den Bosch)
—	MF	Romania	Paul Pațurcă (from Viitorul Domnești, previously on loan)
—	MF	Romania	Adrian Șut (on loan from FCSB, previously sold)
—	FW	Romania	Cristian Dumitru (on loan from FCSB, previously on loan)
—	FW	Romania	Robert Ion (on loan from FCSB, previously on loan from FCSB II)
—	FW	France	Philippe Nsiah (from Daco-Getica București)
—	FW	Romania	Alexandru Popescu (on loan from CS U Craiova, previously on loan at Viitorul Târgu Jiu)
—	FW	Slovakia	Jakub Vojtuš (from (Poland) GKS Tychy)

Out:

No.	Pos.	Nation	Player
—	GK	Romania	Cristian Andrei (loan return to FCSB II, later on loan at Farul Constanța)
—	GK	Moldova	Nicolae Calancea (to Dunărea Călărași, previously signed from Dunărea Călărași)
—	DF	Romania	Alexandru Dinu (loan return to FCSB II, later signed by Free agent)
—	MF	Romania	Ovidiu Horșia (loan return to FCSB II, later on loan to Politehnica Iași)
—	MF	Romania	Salvatore Marrone (loan return to FCSB II, later on loan to Dunărea Călărași)
—	MF	Romania	Vlad Mihalcea (loan return to FCSB, later signed by Voluntari)
—	MF	North Macedonia	Mihailo Mitrov (loan return to FCSB II, later on loan to Farul Constanța)
—	MF	Romania	Alexandru Nicola (loan return to FCSB II, later on loan to Farul Constanța)
—	GK	Romania	Tudor Negrușa (to Unirea Slobozia)
—	MF	Romania	Ciprian Gliga (to Dunărea Călărași)
—	MF	Romania	Paul Pațurcă (to Turris Turnu Măgurele, previously transferred from Viitorul Domnești)
—	FW	Portugal	Danny Esteves (to Free agent, previously transferred from (Portugal) Praiense)

=== Astra Giurgiu ===
In:

No.	Pos.	Nation	Player
—	DF	United States	Danny Barbir (loan return from (Germany) Sandhausen II)
—	DF	Romania	Mircea Popescu (loan return from Metalul Buzău)
—	GK	Bulgaria	Georgi Kitanov (from (Bulgaria) CSKA Sofia, previously on loan at (Bulgaria) Cherno More)
—	DF	Portugal	David Bruno (from (Portugal) Tondela)
—	DF	Romania	Paul Copaci (from UTA Arad)
—	DF	Romania	Alexandru Dandea (from Hermannstadt)
—	DF	Bosnia and Herzegovina	Daniel Graovac (from (Serbia) Vojvodina)
—	DF	Moldova	Dinu Graur (from (Moldova) Milsami Orhei)
—	DF	Romania	Gabriel Simion (on loan from FCSB, previously on loan at Dunărea Călărași)
—	DF	Romania	Gabriel Tamaș (from (Israel) Hapoel Haifa)
—	MF	Moldova	Gheorghe Andronic (from (Moldova) Milsami Orhei)
—	MF	Romania	Constantin Budescu (from (Saudi Arabia) Al-Shabab)
—	MF	Croatia	Ljuban Crepulja (from (Bosnia and Herzegovina) Sarajevo)
—	MF	Romania	Robert Grecu (from Viitorul Constanța, previously on loan at Daco-Getica București)
—	MF	Romania	Florentin Matei (from FCSB)
—	MF	Romania	Mihai Răduț (from (Poland) Lech Poznań)
—	MF	Guinea-Bissau	Toni Silva (from (Egypt) Al Ittihad Alexandria)
—	MF	Romania	Albert Stahl (from UTA Arad)
—	FW	Nigeria	Goodness Ajayi (from (Croatia) Inter Zaprešić)
—	FW	France	Oumare Tounkara (from (France) Châteauroux)

Out:

No.	Pos.	Nation	Player
—	GK	Romania	Cristian Nedelcovici (to Metaloglobus București)
—	GK	Portugal	Miguel Santos (on loan to Academica Clinceni)
—	DF	Romania	Florin Bejan (to Dinamo București)
—	DF	Romania	Claudiu Belu (to Free agent)
—	DF	Romania	Mihai Butean (to CFR Cluj)
—	DF	DR Congo	Mike Cestor (to CFR Cluj)
—	DF	Brazil	Erico (to (Azerbaijan) Sabail)
—	DF	Romania	Radu Crișan (to Dunărea Călărași)
—	DF	Israel	David Tiram (to (Israel) Ashdod, previously signed from (Israel) Maccabi Netanya)
—	MF	Romania	Robert Boboc (on loan to Dunărea Călărași, previously on loan to Mioveni)
—	MF	Romania	Radu Chiriac (on loan to Metaloglobus București)
—	MF	Romania	Sebastian Culda (to Unirea Alba Iulia, previously on loan at Ocna Mureș)
—	MF	Romania	Robert Grecu (to Argeș Pitești)
—	MF	Croatia	Filip Mrzljak (to Dinamo București)
—	MF	Romania	Romario Moise (on loan to UTA Arad)
—	MF	Brazil	Romário Pires (to Hermannstadt)
—	MF	Romania	Mădălin Răileanu (to Sportul Snagov, previously on loan at Metalul Buzău)
—	MF	Romania	Neluț Roșu (to Gaz Metan Mediaș)
—	FW	Cameroon	Serge Ekollo (on loan to Dunărea Călărași, previously signed from (Cameroon) Dragon Club)
—	FW	Finland	Vahid Hambo (to (Lithuania) Sūduva)
—	FW	Albania	Azdren Llullaku (to (Belarus) Shakhtyor Soligorsk)
—	FW	Cameroon	Jacques Zoua (to Free agent)

=== Botoșani ===
In:

No.	Pos.	Nation	Player
—	GK	Moldova	Ianoș Brînză (loan return from Petrolul Ploiești)
—	GK	Romania	Adrian Duță (loan return from Știința Miroslava)
—	MF	Romania	Eduard Florescu (loan return from Argeș Pitești)
—	GK	Austria	Hidajet Hankič (from (Austria) Wacker Innsbruck)
—	DF	Romania	Denis Haruț (from ACS Poli Timișoara)
—	DF	Latvia	Ņikita Koļesovs (from (Latvia) Ventspils)
—	DF	Romania	Alexandru Țigănașu (from Petrolul Ploiești)
—	MF	North Macedonia	Stefan Aškovski (from (Bulgaria) Slavia Sofia)
—	MF	Argentina	Juan Cascini (from (Argentina) Estudiantes, previously on loan at (Cyprus) APOEL)
—	MF	Romania	George Cîmpanu (from Concordia Chiajna, previously on loan at Alexandria)
—	MF	Austria	Mario Ebenhofer (from (Austria) Blau-Weiß Linz)
—	MF	Romania	Aleksandru Longher (from Dinamo București)
—	MF	Italy	Bryan Mendoza (from (Argentina) Barracas Central)
—	MF	Germany	Reagy Ofosu (from (Hungary) Haladás)
—	MF	Argentina	Leonel Pierce (from (Argentina) Santamarina)
—	MF	Romania	Mihai Roman (on loan from FCSB)
—	FW	France	Hamidou Keyta (from Viitorul Constanța)
—	FW	Tunisia	Sofien Moussa (from Concordia Chiajna)

Out:

No.	Pos.	Nation	Player
—	FW	Romania	Mihai Roman II (loan return to CS U Craiova)
—	GK	Austria	Martin Fraisl (to (Germany) SV Sandhausen)
—	GK	Romania	Iulian Anca-Trip (to Viitorul Târgu Jiu)
—	DF	Romania	Andrei Burcă (to CFR Cluj)
—	DF	Romania	Andrei Dumitraș (to Concordia Chiajna)
—	DF	Romania	Andrei Pițian (on loan to Chindia Târgoviște)
—	DF	Greece	Aristidis Soiledis (to FCSB)
—	MF	Romania	Laurențiu Buș (to Academica Clinceni)
—	MF	Italy	Diego Fabbrini (to (Bulgaria) CSKA Sofia, later signed by Dinamo București)
—	MF	Romania	Lóránd Fülöp (to (Hungary) Puskás Akadémia)
—	MF	Romania	Cătălin Golofca (to CFR Cluj)
—	MF	Ivory Coast	Lossémy Karaboué (to (Thailand) Ratchaburi Mitr Phol)
—	MF	Romania	Răzvan Oaidă (to FCSB)

=== CFR Cluj ===
In:

No.	Pos.	Nation	Player
—	MF	Romania	Sebastian Mailat (loan return from Gaz Metan Mediaș)
—	GK	Romania	Cosmin Vâtcă (from Voluntari)
—	DF	Ivory Coast	Kévin Boli (on loan from (China) Guizhou Hengfeng, previously on loan)
—	DF	Romania	Andrei Burcă (from Botoșani)
—	DF	Romania	Mihai Butean (from Astra Giurgiu)
—	DF	DR Congo	Mike Cestor (from Astra Giurgiu)
—	DF	Romania	Alex Pașcanu (from (England) Leicester City)
—	DF	Bosnia and Herzegovina	Mateo Sušić (from (Moldova) Sheriff Tiraspol)
—	MF	Portugal	Luís Aurélio (from Gaz Metan Mediaș)
—	MF	Romania	Cătălin Golofca (from Botoșani)
—	MF	France	Michaël Pereira (from (Turkey) Yeni Malatyaspor)
—	MF	Mali	Yacouba Sylla (from (Norway) Strømsgodset)
—	FW	Venezuela	Mario Rondón (from Gaz Metan Mediaș)
—	FW	Ivory Coast	Lacina Traoré (from (Hungary) Újpest)

Out:

No.	Pos.	Nation	Player
—	DF	Romania	Cristian Manea (loan return to (Cyprus) Apollon Limassol, later on loan to FCSB)
—	GK	Romania	Ionuț Rus (on loan to Turris Turnu Măgurele, previously on loan at Luceafărul Oradea)
—	DF	Hungary	Ádám Lang (to (Cyprus) Omonia)
—	DF	Romania	Andrei Radu (on loan to Politehnica Iași, previously on loan at Concordia Chiajna)
—	MF	Romania	Alexandru Ioniță (on loan to CS U Craiova)
—	MF	Croatia	Mate Maleš (to (Norway) Sarpsborg 08)
—	MF	Portugal	Thierry Moutinho (to FCSB)
—	MF	France	Bryan Nouvier (to (Poland) Raków Częstochowa, previously on loan at Sepsi Sfântu Gheorghe)
—	FW	Romania	Cristian Bud (to Turris Turnu Măgurele)
—	FW	Romania	Gabriel Dodoi (to Rapid București, previously on loan at Pandurii Târgu Jiu)

=== Chindia Târgoviște ===
In:

No.	Pos.	Nation	Player
—	DF	Romania	Robert Călin (loan return from Pucioasa)
—	FW	Romania	Claudiu Niculăescu (loan return from Pucioasa)
—	GK	Romania	Dinu Moldovan (from ACS Poli Timișoara)
—	DF	Romania	Alexandru Benga (from (Bulgaria) Septemvri Sofia)
—	DF	Romania	Mihai Leca (from Concordia Chiajna, previously on loan)
—	DF	Romania	Robert Neciu (on loan from Viitorul Constanța, previously on loan at Farul Constanța)
—	DF	Romania	Andrei Pițian (on loan from Botoșani)
—	MF	Romania	Ovidiu Bic (on loan from CS U Craiova)
—	FW	Romania	Andrei Burlacu (on loan from CS U Craiova)
—	FW	Romania	Andrei Dumiter (on loan from Sepsi Sfântu Gheorghe)
—	FW	Romania	Mihai Voduț (from (Israel) Beitar Jerusalem)
—	FW	Burkina Faso	Blaise Yaméogo (from Free agent)

Out:

No.	Pos.	Nation	Player
—	DF	Romania	Dan Panait (loan return to Viitorul Constanța, later on loan at Farul Constanța)
—	MF	Romania	Andreas Mihaiu (loan return to Dinamo București)
—	FW	Romania	Valentin Alexandru (loan return to Dunărea Călărași, later signed by SCM Gloria Buzău)
—	GK	Romania	Teodor Meilă (to Daco-Getica București, later signed by CSA Steaua București)
—	DF	Romania	Lucian Acasandrei (to Progresul Spartac București)
—	DF	Romania	Ionuț Georgescu (on loan to Pucioasa)
—	DF	Romania	Crinel Stoica (to Focșani)
—	DF	Romania	Bogdan Șandru (to Dunărea Călărași)
—	DF	Romania	Marian Vătavu (Retired)
—	MF	Romania	Dan Marmandiu (on loan to Pucioasa)
—	FW	Romania	Nicușor Manolache (on loan to Pucioasa)
—	FW	Romania	Mihai Neicuțescu (loan return to Dinamo București)
—	FW	Romania	Alin Nisipeanu (to Pucioasa)

=== CS U Craiova ===
In:

No.	Pos.	Nation	Player
—	GK	Romania	Cristian Dică (loan return from Viitorul Târgu Jiu)
—	DF	Romania	Florin Borța (loan return from Petrolul Ploiești)
—	DF	Romania	Remus Enache (loan return from Viitorul Târgu Jiu)
—	DF	Romania	Florin Gardoș (loan return from Politehnica Iași)
—	DF	Romania	Robert Petre (loan return from Viitorul Târgu Jiu)
—	DF	Romania	Ștefan Vlădoiu (loan return from Dunărea Călărași)
—	MF	Romania	Lucian Buzan (loan return from ACS Poli Timișoara)
—	FW	Romania	Andrei Burlacu (loan return from Politehnica Iași)
—	FW	Romania	Mihai Roman II (loan return from Botoșani)
—	GK	Romania	Andrei Marinescu (from Sportul Snagov)
—	DF	Romania	Mihai Bălașa (from FCSB)
—	DF	Serbia	Uroš Ćosić (from (Greece) AEK Athens)
—	DF	Romania	Alexandru Mățel (from Hermannstadt)
—	DF	Romania	Bogdan Vătăjelu (from (Czech Republic) Sparta Prague, previously on loan at (Czech Republic) Jablonec)
—	MF	Romania	Alexandru Ioniță (on loan from CFR Cluj)
—	MF	Bulgaria	Antoni Ivanov (from Gaz Metan Mediaș)
—	MF	Albania	Kamer Qaka (from Politehnica Iași)
—	FW	Romania	Andrei Ivan (from (Russia) Krasnodar, previously on loan at (Austria) Rapid Wien)

Out:

No.	Pos.	Nation	Player
—	MF	Switzerland	Matteo Fedele (loan return to (Italy) Foggia, later signed by (France) Valenciennes)
—	GK	Romania	Eduard Stăncioiu (Retired)
—	DF	Bulgaria	Radoslav Dimitrov (to Sepsi Sfântu Gheorghe)
—	DF	Ghana	Isaac Donkor (to (Austria) Sturm Graz)
—	DF	Romania	Răzvan Popa (to Gaz Metan Mediaș)
—	MF	Romania	Ovidiu Bic (on loan to Chindia Târgoviște)
—	MF	Romania	Lucian Buzan (on loan to Hermannstadt)
—	MF	Romania	Stephan Drăghici (to Gaz Metan Mediaș)
—	MF	Paraguay	César Meza (on loan to (Azerbaijan) Keşla)
—	MF	Cape Verde	Nuno Rocha (to Free agent)
—	FW	Romania	Andrei Burlacu (on loan to Chindia Târgoviște, previously on loan at Politehnica Iași)
—	FW	Romania	Andrei Cristea (to Politehnica Iași)
—	FW	Romania	Alexandru Popescu (on loan to Academica Clinceni, previously on loan to Viitorul Târgu Jiu)

=== Dinamo București ===
In:

No.	Pos.	Nation	Player
—	GK	Romania	Mihai Eșanu (loan return from Daco-Getica București)
—	DF	Romania	Laurențiu Corbu (loan return from (Scotland) St Mirren)
—	DF	Romania	Ekrem Oltay (loan return from Dunărea Călărași)
—	DF	Romania	Mihai Popescu (loan return from (Scotland) St Mirren)
—	MF	Romania	Andreas Mihaiu (loan return from Chindia Târgoviște)
—	MF	Romania	Mihnea Vlad (loan return from Turris Turnu Măgurele)
—	MF	Romania	Vlăduț Vlad (loan return from Metaloglobus București)
—	FW	Romania	Robert Moldoveanu (loan return from Petrolul Ploiești)
—	FW	Romania	Mihai Neicuțescu (loan return from Chindia Târgoviște)
—	GK	Italy	Riccardo Piscitelli (from (Italy) Carpi)
—	GK	Romania	Cătălin Straton (from Dunărea Călărași)
—	DF	Romania	Florin Bejan (from Astra Giurgiu)
—	DF	Brazil	Gabriel Moura (from Sepsi Sfântu Gheorghe)
—	DF	Croatia	Ante Puljić (from (Saudi Arabia) Al-Faisaly)
—	MF	Mauritius	Kévin Bru (from (Cyprus) Apollon Limassol)
—	MF	Italy	Diego Fabbrini (from (Bulgaria) CSKA Sofia)
—	MF	Croatia	Filip Mrzljak (from Astra Giurgiu)
—	MF	Romania	Alexandru Răuță (from Voluntari)
—	MF	Romania	Andrei Sin (from Politehnica Iași)
—	MF	Romania	Roberto Strechie (from (Italy) Venezia, previously on loan at (Italy) Lucchese)
—	FW	Cape Verde	Brito (from (Greece) Xanthi)
—	FW	Serbia	Slavko Perović (from (Turkey) İstanbulspor)

Out:

No.	Pos.	Nation	Player
—	GK	DR Congo	Parfait Mandanda (loan return to (Belgium) Charleroi)
—	GK	Romania	Vlad Muțiu (to Farul Constanța)
—	DF	Albania	Naser Aliji (to (Hungary) Budapest Honvéd)
—	DF	France	Damien Dussaut (to Free agent)
—	DF	Romania	Marco Ehmann (on loan to CSM Reșița, previously on loan at Farul Constanța)
—	DF	Uruguay	Facundo Mallo (to Rapid București)
—	DF	Romania	Vlad Olteanu (on loan to Concordia Chiajna, previously on loan to ACS Poli Timișoara)
—	DF	Romania	Radu Zamfir (on loan to Daco-Getica București)
—	MF	Algeria	Rachid Aït-Atmane (to (Tunisia) Sfaxien)
—	MF	Romania	Geani Crețu (on loan to Rapid București)
—	MF	Romania	Liviu Gheorghe (on loan to Daco-Getica București, previously on loan at Sportul Snagov)
—	MF	Belgium	Reda Jaadi (to (Morocco) FUS Rabat)
—	MF	Albania	Elvis Kabashi (to (Italy) Renate)
—	MF	Romania	Alin Lazăr (on loan to CSM Reșița)
—	MF	Romania	Aleksandru Longher (to Botoșani)
—	MF	Romania	Raul Negotei (to SR Brașov, previously on loan at Metaloglobus București)
—	MF	Nigeria	Simon Zenke (to Free agent)
—	FW	Angola	Alexander Christovão (to (Saudi Arabia) Al-Mujazzal)
—	FW	Romania	Cătălin Măgureanu (on loan to Afumați, previously on loan at Dunărea Călărași)
—	FW	Morocco	Nabil Jaadi (to (Morocco) FUS Rabat)
—	FW	Greece	Thanasis Papazoglou (to Voluntari)
—	FW	Romania	Gabriel Răducan (on loan to Daco-Getica București)

=== FCSB ===
In:

No.	Pos.	Nation	Player
—	GK	Romania	Toma Niga (loan return from Hermannstadt)
—	DF	Romania	Claudiu Belu (from Free agent)
—	DF	Bulgaria	Bozhidar Chorbadzhiyski (on loan from (Bulgaria) CSKA Sofia)
—	DF	Romania	Valentin Crețu (from Gaz Metan Mediaș)
—	DF	Romania	Cristian Manea (on loan from (Cyprus) Apollon Limassol, previously on loan at CFR Cluj)
—	DF	Romania	Andrei Marc (on loan from Concordia Chiajna)
—	DF	Romania	Ionuț Panțîru (from Politehnica Iași)
—	DF	Greece	Aristidis Soiledis (from Botoșani)
—	MF	Portugal	Thierry Moutinho (from CFR Cluj)
—	MF	Romania	Răzvan Oaidă (from Botoșani)
—	MF	Romania	Adrian Popa (on loan from (England) Reading, previously on loan at (Bulgaria) Ludogorets Razgrad)
—	MF	Portugal	Diogo Salomão (from (Saudi Arabia) Al-Hazem)
—	MF	Romania	Ionuț Vînă (from Viitorul Constanța)
—	FW	Poland	Łukasz Gikiewicz (from (Saudi Arabia) Hajer)
—	FW	Congo	Juvhel Tsoumou (from Hermannstadt)

Out:

No.	Pos.	Nation	Player
—	GK	Romania	Răzvan Ducan (on loan to Argeș Pitești)
—	DF	Romania	Mihai Bălașa (to CS U Craiova)
—	DF	Romania	Romario Benzar (to (Italy) Lecce)
—	DF	Romania	Andrei Marc (loan return to Concordia Chiajna)
—	DF	Brazil	Júnior Morais (to (Turkey) Gazişehir Gaziantep)
—	DF	Romania	Sorin Șerban (on loan to Politehnica Iași, previously signed from Minaur Baia Mare)
—	DF	Romania	Gabriel Simion (on loan to Astra Giurgiu, previously on loan at Dunărea Călărași)
—	MF	Romania	Daniel Benzar (to Voluntari, previously on loan at Dunărea Călărași)
—	MF	Romania	Robert Ion (on loan to Academica Clinceni)
—	MF	Romania	Florentin Matei (to Astra Giurgiu)
—	MF	Romania	Vlad Mihalcea (to Voluntari, previously on loan at Academica Clinceni)
—	MF	Romania	Mihai Roman (on loan to Botoșani)
—	MF	Romania	Adrian Stoian (to (Italy) Livorno)
—	MF	Romania	Adrian Șut (on loan to Academica Clinceni, previously signed)
—	MF	Portugal	Filipe Teixeira (to Retired)
—	FW	Romania	Cristian Dumitru (on loan to Academica Clinceni, previously on loan)
—	FW	Romania	Raul Rusescu (to (Turkey) Giresunspor)
—	FW	Romania	Ianis Stoica (on loan to Petrolul Ploiești, previously on loan at Dunărea Călărași)

=== Gaz Metan Mediaș ===
In:

No.	Pos.	Nation	Player
—	GK	Romania	Albert Popa (from SR Brașov)
—	DF	Romania	Răzvan Popa (from CS U Craiova)
—	DF	Romania	Mihai Velisar (on loan from Petrolul Ploiești)
—	MF	Romania	Sergiu Ciocan (from Comuna Recea)
—	MF	France	Mickaël Diakota (from (France) Béziers)
—	MF	Romania	Stephan Drăghici (from CS U Craiova)
—	MF	Czech Republic	Lukáš Droppa (from (Kazakhstan) Shakhter Karagandy)
—	MF	Romania	Neluț Roșu (from Astra Giurgiu)
—	MF	Netherlands	Moussa Sanoh (from Politehnica Iași)
—	FW	Romania	Sergiu Buș (from (Bulgaria) Levski Sofia)
—	FW	Italy	Nicolao Dumitru (from (Italy) Livorno)

Out:

No.	Pos.	Nation	Player
—	MF	Romania	Sebastian Mailat (loan return to CFR Cluj)
—	DF	Romania	Sorin Bușu (to Hermannstadt)
—	DF	Romania	Valentin Crețu (to FCSB)
—	DF	France	Bradley Diallo (to Politehnica Iași)
—	DF	Romania	Bogdan Jica (on loan to Daco-Getica București)
—	DF	Portugal	André Micael (to (Portugal) Paços de Ferreira)
—	DF	Romania	Daniel Pop (to Luceafărul Oradea)
—	DF	Romania	Alexandru Socaci (on loan to Daco-Getica București)
—	MF	Portugal	Luís Aurélio (to CFR Cluj)
—	MF	Portugal	David Caiado (to Hermannstadt)
—	MF	Romania	Andrei Doda (on loan to Viitorul Șelimbăr)
—	MF	Romania	Raul Hăjmășan (to Viitorul Târgu Jiu)
—	MF	Bulgaria	Antoni Ivanov (to CS U Craiova)
—	MF	Portugal	Pedro Mendes (to Universitatea Cluj)
—	FW	Venezuela	Mario Rondón (to CFR Cluj)
—	FW	Portugal	Yazalde (to Hermannstadt)

=== Hermannstadt ===
In:

No.	Pos.	Nation	Player
—	GK	Portugal	Cristiano (from (Portugal) Vitória Setúbal)
—	GK	Portugal	Emanuel Novo (from (Portugal) Varzim)
—	GK	Romania	Ionuț Pop (from (Italy) Alessandria)
—	DF	Romania	Sorin Bușu (from Gaz Metan Mediaș)
—	DF	Romania	Srdjan Luchin (from Dunărea Călărași)
—	DF	Romania	Raul Opruț (from (Italy) Genoa, previously on loan at (Italy) Albissola)
—	DF	French Guiana	Kévin Rimane (from (France) Paris Saint-Germain, previously on loan at (Croatia) Istra 1961)
—	DF	Ivory Coast	Ousmane Viera (from Sepsi Sfântu Gheorghe)
—	MF	Romania	Lucian Buzan (on loan from CS U Craiova)
—	MF	Portugal	David Caiado (from Gaz Metan Mediaș)
—	MF	Romania	Andrei Cordea (from (Italy) Novara)
—	MF	Brazil	Romário Pires (from Astra Giurgiu)
—	MF	Portugal	Afonso Taira (from (Israel) Beitar Jerusalem)
—	MF	Romania	Alexandru Vodă (from Pandurii Târgu Jiu)
—	FW	Croatia	Gabriel Debeljuh (from (Italy) Este)
—	FW	Italy	Mattia Persano (from (Italy) Lecce, previously on loan at (Italy) Arezzo)
—	FW	Croatia	Stjepan Plazonja (from (Croatia) Kustošija)
—	FW	Brazil	Jô Santos (from (Latvia) Ventspils)
—	FW	Romania	Andrei Sîntean (from Sepsi Sfântu Gheorghe)
—	FW	Portugal	Yazalde (from Gaz Metan Mediaș)

Out:

No.	Pos.	Nation	Player
—	GK	Romania	Cătălin Căbuz (loan return to Viitorul Constanța)
—	GK	Romania	Toma Niga (loan return to FCSB)
—	GK	Romania	Dragoș Ciorgovean (on loan to Viitorul Șelimbăr)
—	DF	Romania	Florin Acsinte (to Free agent)
—	DF	Romania	Alexandru Dandea (to Astra Giurgiu)
—	DF	Romania	Alexandru Mățel (to CS U Craiova)
—	DF	Montenegro	Nemanja Mijušković (to (Poland) Miedź Legnica)
—	DF	Romania	Cătălin Pârvulescu (to Turris Turnu Măgurele)
—	DF	Romania	Andrei Stanciu (on loan to Viitorul Șelimbăr)
—	DF	Romania	Alexandru Străulea (on loan to Viitorul Șelimbăr)
—	MF	Estonia	Ilja Antonov (to Ararat-Armenia)
—	MF	Romania	Andrei Câmpean (on loan to Viitorul Șelimbăr)
—	MF	Romania	Alexandru Curtean (to Free agent)
—	MF	Romania	Paul Hodea (on loan to Viitorul Șelimbăr)
—	MF	Croatia	Filip Jazvić (to Free agent)
—	MF	Romania	George Monea (to Ripensia Timișoara, previously on loan)
—	MF	Romania	Gheorghe Morariu (on loan to Viitorul Șelimbăr)
—	MF	Portugal	Pedro Moreira (to Free agent)
—	MF	Romania	Radu Necșulescu (to CSM Slatina, previously on loan at Metalurgistul Cugir)
—	MF	Romania	Sergiu Popovici (to Free agent)
—	MF	Romania	Tiberiu Serediuc (to Free agent)
—	MF	Romania	Ruben Sumanariu (to Foresta Suceava)
—	MF	Romania	Cătălin Tineiu (on loan to Viitorul Șelimbăr)
—	FW	North Macedonia	Besart Abdurahimi (to (Slovenia) Bravo)
—	FW	Romania	Ștefan Blănaru (to Petrolul Ploiești)
—	FW	Croatia	Ivan Lendrić (to (Bosnia and Herzegovina) Zrinjski Mostar)
—	FW	Argentina	Matías Roskopf (to Rapid București)
—	FW	Romania	Bogdan Rusu (to Dunărea Călărași, previously on loan to Petrolul Ploiești)
—	FW	Congo	Juvhel Tsoumou (to FCSB)

=== Politehnica Iași ===
In:

No.	Pos.	Nation	Player
—	GK	Romania	Ștefan Târnovanu (loan return from Sportul Snagov)
—	MF	Romania	Robert Dodan (loan return from Știința Miroslava)
—	FW	Romania	Sabin Moldovan (loan return from Alexandria)
—	DF	Netherlands	Rodny Cabral (from (Netherlands) Telstar)
—	DF	France	Bradley Diallo (from Gaz Metan Mediaș)
—	DF	Romania	Răzvan Onea (from Afumați)
—	DF	Romania	Andrei Radu (on loan from CFR Cluj, previously on loan at Concordia Chiajna)
—	DF	Romania	Sorin Șerban (on loan from FCSB)
—	MF	Romania	Cosmin Bîrnoi (from ACS Poli Timișoara)
—	MF	Netherlands	Nicandro Breeveld (from (Qatar) Al-Markhiya)
—	MF	Belgium	Alessio Carlone (from (Belgium) Patro Eisden)
—	MF	Spain	Didac Devesa (from (Cyprus) Ermis Aradippou)
—	MF	Romania	Ovidiu Horșia (on loan from FCSB II, previously on loan at Academica Clinceni)
—	MF	Kosovo	Florian Loshaj (from (Netherlands) Roda JC)
—	MF	Argentina	Passaglia (from (Argentina) Barracas Central)
—	MF	Romania	Doru Popadiuc (from Voluntari)
—	FW	Romania	Adrian Bălan (from Voluntari)
—	FW	Romania	Andrei Cristea (from CS U Craiova)
—	FW	Romania	Iuliu Hațiegan (from Universitatea Cluj)

Out:

No.	Pos.	Nation	Player
—	DF	Romania	Florin Gardoș (loan return to CS U Craiova)
—	MF	Portugal	Filipe Nascimento (loan return to (Bulgaria) Levski Sofia)
—	FW	Romania	Andrei Burlacu (loan return to CS U Craiova, later on loan to Chindia Târgoviște)
—	GK	Romania	Teodor Axinte (on loan to Aerostar Bacău, previously on loan at Viitorul Târgu Jiul)
—	GK	Spain	Rubén Miño (to (Spain) Logroñés)
—	DF	Romania	Gabriel Bosoi (to (Italy) Polisportiva Lunano)
—	DF	Romania	Ionuț Panțîru (to FCSB)
—	DF	Romania	Ștefan Popescu (to Free agent)
—	DF	Romania	Dragoș Tibucanu (on loan to Ozana Târgu Neamț)
—	MF	Romania	Ionuț Cioinac (to Petrolul Ploiești)
—	MF	Romania	Mădălin Mihăescu (to Petrolul Ploiești)
—	MF	France	Daudet N'Dongala (to Free agent)
—	MF	Romania	Patrick Petre (to Farul Constanța)
—	MF	Romania	Laurențiu Rus (to Sănătatea Cluj)
—	MF	Netherlands	Moussa Sanoh (to Gaz Metan Mediaș)
—	MF	France	Willy Semedo (to (France) Grenoble)
—	MF	Albania	Kamer Qaka (to CS U Craiova)
—	MF	Romania	Andrei Sin (to Dinamo București)
—	MF	Romania	Cătălin Ștefănescu (to Petrolul Ploiești, previously on loan)
—	MF	Romania	Alexandru Zaharia (to Petrolul Ploiești)
—	FW	Angola	Aguinaldo (to (Malaysia) Sabah)
—	FW	Romania	Vlad Danale (on loan to Aerostar Bacău, previously on loan to Sportul Snagov)
—	FW	Cameroon	Lewis Enoh (to (Portugal) Leixões)
—	FW	Spain	Boris Garrós (to (Spain) Sabadell)
—	FW	Moldova	Vlad Sobraneschi (on loan to Pașcani)
—	FW	Romania	Alexandru Iulian Zaharia (on loan to Ozana Târgu Neamț)

=== Sepsi Sfântu Gheorghe ===
In:

No.	Pos.	Nation	Player
—	FW	Romania	Marius Ștefănescu (loan return from KSE Târgu Secuiesc)
—	FW	Romania	Zsombor Veress (loan return from KSE Târgu Secuiesc)
—	GK	Romania	Horațiu Moldovan (from Ripensia Timișoara)
—	DF	Croatia	Hrvoje Barišić (from (Bosnia and Herzegovina) Zrinjski Mostar)
—	DF	Algeria	Rachid Bouhenna (from (Scotland) Dundee United)
—	DF	Senegal	Oumar Diakhite (from (Portugal) Estoril)
—	DF	Bulgaria	Radoslav Dimitrov (from CS U Craiova)
—	DF	Romania	Szabolcs Kilyén (on loan from Viitorul Constanța, previously on loan at Mioveni)
—	DF	Congo	Hugo Konongo (from (Bulgaria) Cherno More)
—	DF	Romania	Răzvan Tincu (from (Cyprus) Doxa Katokopias)
—	MF	Nigeria	Jacob Adebanjo (from (Portugal) Vitória Setúbal)
—	MF	Romania	Ronaldo Deaconu (from (Croatia) Gorica)
—	MF	Slovakia	Peter Gál-Andrezly (from (Slovakia) Ružomberok)
—	MF	Netherlands	Hilal Ben Moussa (from (Netherlands) Emmen)
—	FW	Switzerland	Goran Karanović (from (Switzerland) Aarau)
—	FW	Cameroon	Edgar Salli (from (Germany) 1. FC Nürnberg)
—	FW	Slovakia	Pavol Šafranko (from (Denmark) AaB, previously on loan at (Scotland) Dundee United)

Out:

No.	Pos.	Nation	Player
—	MF	France	Bryan Nouvier (loan return to CFR Cluj, later signed by (Poland) Raków Częstochowa)
—	GK	Romania	Relu Stoian (to SCM Gloria Buzău)
—	GK	Romania	Daniel Zaha (to Olimpia Salonta, previously on loan at Național Sebiș)
—	DF	Germany	Igor Jovanović (to (Greece) Panetolikos)
—	DF	Brazil	Gabriel Moura (to Dinamo București)
—	DF	Kenya	Aboud Omar (to Free agent)
—	DF	Poland	Sebastian Rudol (to (Poland) Widzew Łódź)
—	DF	Romania	Adrian Rus (to (Hungary) Fehérvár)
—	DF	Philippines	Daisuke Sato (to (Thailand) Muangthong United)
—	DF	Romania	Ionuț Ursu (to Farul Constanța, previously on loan to Universitatea Cluj)
—	DF	Ivory Coast	Ousmane Viera (to Hermannstadt)
—	MF	Romania	Tudor Călin (to Ripensia Timișoara, previously on loan to Luceafărul Oradea)
—	MF	Belarus	Alyaksandr Karnitsky (to (Hungary) Mezőkövesd)
—	MF	Ghana	Joseph Mensah (to (Turkey) İstanbulspor)
—	MF	Romania	Călin Popescu (on loan to ASU Politehnica Timișoara)
—	MF	Mali	Ibrahima Tandia (to (Saudi Arabia) Al-Hazem)
—	FW	Romania	Andrei Dumiter (on loan to Chindia Târgoviște, previously signed from Ripensia Timișoara)
—	FW	Romania	Attila Hadnagy (Retired)
—	FW	North Macedonia	Marko Simonovski (to Voluntari)
—	FW	Romania	Andrei Sîntean (to Hermannstadt)

=== Viitorul Constanța ===
In:

No.	Pos.	Nation	Player
—	GK	Romania	Cătălin Căbuz (loan return from Hermannstadt)
—	GK	Romania	Rareș Micu (loan return from Medgidia)
—	DF	Romania	Paul Acasandrei (loan return from Axiopolis Cernavodă)
—	DF	Romania	Mădălin Androne (loan return from SCM Gloria Buzău)
—	DF	Romania	Tiberiu Căpușă (loan return from Universitatea Cluj)
—	DF	Romania	Darius Grosu (loan return from Afumați)
—	DF	Romania	Robert Hodorogea (loan return from Voluntari)
—	MF	Romania	Vlad Chera (loan return from Ripensia Timișoara)
—	MF	Romania	Doru Dumitrescu (loan return from Universitatea Cluj)
—	MF	Romania	Giani Gherghiceanu (loan return from Alexandria)
—	MF	Romania	Rareș Oană (loan return from Sporting Liești)
—	FW	Romania	Cristian Ene (loan return from ASU Politehnica Timișoara)
—	FW	Romania	Alexandru Stoica (loan return from Petrolul Ploiești)
—	DF	Romania	Steliano Filip (from Dunărea Călărași)
—	MF	Romania	Marco Dulca (from (Wales) Swansea City)
—	MF	Romania	Cosmin Matei (from (Turkey) Gençlerbirliği)
—	FW	Romania	Gabriel Iancu (from Dunărea Călărași)
—	FW	Brazil	Rivaldinho (from (Bulgaria) Levski Sofia, previously on loan)

Out:

No.	Pos.	Nation	Player
—	MF	Romania	Tudor Băluță (loan return to (England) Brighton & Hove Albion)
—	GK	Moldova	Sebastian Agachi (on loan to Argeș Pitești, previously on loan at Pucioasa)
—	GK	Romania	Ionuț Gurău (to Daco-Getica București, previously on loan at SCM Gloria Buzău)
—	GK	Romania	Haralambie Mociu (to Ripensia Timișoara, previously on loan at Medgidia)
—	GK	Romania	Rareș Murariu (to ASU Politehnica Timișoara, previously on loan)
—	GK	Romania	Árpád Tordai (on loan to Universitatea Cluj)
—	DF	Romania	Szabolcs Kilyén (on loan to Sepsi Sfântu Gheorghe, previously on loan at Mioveni)
—	DF	Netherlands	Bas Kuipers (to (Netherlands) NEC)
—	DF	Romania	Robert Neciu (on loan to Chindia Târgoviște, previously on loan to Farul Constanța)
—	DF	Romania	Gabriel Nedelea (on loan to SCM Gloria Buzău)
—	DF	Romania	Dan Panait (on loan to Farul Constanța, previously on loan to Chindia Târgoviște)
—	DF	Romania	Ciprian Perju (to SCM Gloria Buzău, previously on loan at Afumați)
—	DF	Romania	Alexandru Sabangeanu (on loan to Dunărea Călărași, previously on loan at Farul Constanța)
—	MF	Algeria	Najib Ammari (to Free agent, previously signed from Dunărea Călărași)
—	MF	Romania	Mihai Ene (to Free agent, previously on loan at ASU Politehnica Timișoara)
—	MF	Romania	Robert Grecu (to Astra Giurgiu, previously on loan at Daco-Getica București)
—	MF	Romania	Ianis Hagi (to (Belgium) Genk)
—	MF	Romania	Florian Haită (on loan to Turris Turnu Măgurele)
—	MF	Romania	Andreas Iani (on loan to Daco-Getica București, previously on loan at Farul Constanța)
—	MF	France	Hamidou Keyta (to Botoșani, previously signed from Dunărea Călărași)
—	MF	Spain	Dani López (to Free agent)
—	MF	Romania	Răzvan Matiș (on loan to Argeș Pitești)
—	MF	Romania	Alexandru Mățan (on loan to Voluntari)
—	MF	Romania	Cezar Mihalache (to Free agent, previously on loan at Argeș Pitești)
—	MF	Russia	Amir Natkho (to (Belarus) BATE Borisov)
—	MF	Romania	Alexandru Negrean (on loan to Viitorul Târgu Jiu)
—	MF	Romania	Adrian Neniță (to Free agent)
—	MF	Romania	Andrei Tîrcoveanu (on loan to Concordia Chiajna)
—	MF	Romania	Cosmin Tucaliuc (on loan to SCM Gloria Buzău)
—	MF	Ghana	Kofi Twumasi (to (Germany) Rot-Weiß Oberhausen, previously on loan at Universitatea Cluj)
—	MF	Romania	Ionuț Vînă (to FCSB)
—	FW	Romania	Denis Drăguș (to (Belgium) Standard Liège)
—	FW	Romania	Dimciu Halep (on loan to Farul Constanța)
—	FW	Romania	Alexandru Pop (to Universitatea Cluj)

=== Voluntari ===
In:

No.	Pos.	Nation	Player
—	DF	Romania	Daniel Mitrache (loan return from Balotești)
—	MF	Romania	Dorin Capotă (loan return from Balotești)
—	MF	Romania	Robert Constantinescu (loan return from Afumați)
—	MF	Romania	Constantin Costache (loan return from Metaloglobus București)
—	FW	Romania	Alexandru Stoica (loan return from Balotești)
—	GK	Romania	Victor Rîmniceanu (from Concordia Chiajna)
—	DF	Spain	Julio (from (Croatia) Istra 1961)
—	DF	Slovenia	Milan Kocić (from (Greece) Panionios)
—	DF	Romania	Constantin Nica (from Dunărea Călărași)
—	MF	Romania	Daniel Benzar (from FCSB, previously on loan at Dunărea Călărași)
—	MF	Romania	Claudiu Borțoneanu (from Sportul Snagov)
—	MF	Romania	Cristian Costin (from UTA Arad)
—	MF	Georgia	Avtandil Ebralidze (from (Portugal) Nacional)
—	MF	Argentina	Nicolás Gorobsov (from Concordia Chiajna)
—	MF	Romania	Alexandru Mățan (on loan from Viitorul Constanța)
—	MF	Venezuela	Franco Signorelli (from (Italy) Salernitana, previously on loan)
—	FW	Austria	Martin Harrer (from (Austria) Wacker Innsbruck)
—	FW	Greece	Thanasis Papazoglou (from Dinamo București)
—	FW	North Macedonia	Marko Simonovski (from Sepsi Sfântu Gheorghe)
—	FW	Romania	Cătălin Țîră (from (Greece) Episkopi)

Out:

No.	Pos.	Nation	Player
—	DF	Romania	Robert Hodorogea (loan return to Viitorul Constanța)
—	DF	Kosovo	Jetmir Krasniqi (loan return to (Switzerland) Lugano)
—	GK	Romania	Răzvan Petrariu (Retired)
—	GK	Romania	Robert Răileanu (to Luceafărul Oradea)
—	GK	Romania	Cosmin Vâtcă (to CFR Cluj)
—	DF	Romania	Bogdan Bucurică (to Free agent)
—	DF	Romania	Dragoș Cojocaru (to Free agent, previously on loan at ASU Politehnica Timișoara)
—	DF	Italy	Adriano Russo (to Free agent)
—	MF	France	Abdelhak Belahmeur (to Free agent)
—	MF	Romania	Gabriel Deac (to Petrolul Ploiești)
—	MF	Romania	Costin Lazăr (Retired)
—	MF	Romania	Laurențiu Manole (to Dunărea Călărași, previously on loan to Sportul Snagov)
—	MF	Romania	Vlad Mihalcea (to Universitatea Cluj, previously signed from FCSB)
—	MF	Romania	Adelin Pîrcălabu (to SCM Gloria Buzău)
—	MF	Romania	Doru Popadiuc (to Politehnica Iași)
—	MF	Romania	Alexandru Răuță (to Dinamo București)
—	MF	Romania	Alexandru Ionuț Stoica (on loan to Farul Constanța)
—	FW	Romania	Adrian Bălan (to Politehnica Iași)
—	FW	Ghana	Richard Gadze (to Free agent)
—	FW	Romania	Alexandru Tudorie (to (Russia) Arsenal Tula)

== Liga II ==
=== Argeș Pitești ===
In:

No.	Pos.	Nation	Player
—	GK	Moldova	Sebastian Agachi (on loan from Viitorul Constanța, previously on loan at Pucioasa)
—	GK	Romania	Răzvan Ducan (on loan from FCSB)
—	DF	Romania	Denis Brînzan (from Pandurii Târgu Jiu)
—	DF	Romania	Robert Dănescu (from Pandurii Târgu Jiu)
—	DF	France	Kevin Moihedja (from Luceafărul Oradea)
—	DF	Romania	Vlad Motroc (from Daco-Getica București)
—	DF	Romania	Nicolae Mușat (from Daco-Getica București)
—	MF	Romania	Angelo Cocian (from Unirea Tășnad)
—	MF	Romania	Robert Grecu (from Astra Giurgiu)
—	MF	Romania	Răzvan Matiș (on loan from Viitorul Constanța)
—	MF	Romania	Nini Popescu (from Petrolul Ploiești)
—	MF	Romania	Andrei Prepeliță (from Free agent)
—	MF	Romania	Antonio Stan (from Vedița Colonești, previously on loan at Unirea Bascov)
—	MF	Romania	Paul Szecui (from FCSB II)
—	FW	Romania	Andrei Blejdea (from Pandurii Târgu Jiu)

Out:

No.	Pos.	Nation	Player
—	DF	Romania	Raul Hreniuc (loan return to CSU II Craiova)
—	MF	Romania	Eduard Florescu (loan return to Botoșani)
—	FW	Romania	Cezar Mihalache (loan return to Viitorul Constanța, later on loan at Sportul Snagov)
—	GK	Romania	Nicușor Grecu (to CSM Slatina)
—	DF	Romania	Alexandru Borțosu (to Free agent, previously on loan at Alexandria)
—	DF	Romania	Cătălin Stan (to Free agent)
—	MF	Romania	Alin Buleică (to Turris Turnu Măgurele)
—	MF	Romania	Raul Costin (to Mioveni)
—	MF	Romania	Rareș Enceanu (to CSA Steaua București)
—	MF	Romania	Vasile Gheorghe (to CSM Slatina)
—	MF	Romania	Adrian Ungur (on loan to Filiași)
—	FW	Romania	Andrei Nilă (to Vedița Colonești)

=== ASU Politehnica Timișoara ===
In:

No.	Pos.	Nation	Player
—	GK	Romania	Mario Contra (on loan from ACS Poli Timișoara)
—	GK	Romania	Rareș Murariu (from Viitorul Constanța, previously on loan)
—	GK	Moldova	Emil Tîmbur (from (Belarus) Torpedo Zhodino)
—	MF	Romania	Dragoș Coroiu (from CNP Timișoara)
—	MF	Romania	Adrian Lazăr (from LPS Bihorul Oradea)
—	MF	Romania	Sabin Lupu (from FC U Craiova, previously on loan at Filiași)
—	MF	Romania	Călin Popescu (on loan from Sepsi OSK Sfântu Gheorghe)
—	MF	Romania	Adrian Ungureanu (from Ripensia Timișoara)
—	FW	Romania	Mircea Axente (from Universitatea Cluj)
—	FW	Romania	Răzvan Pițigoi (from CNP Timișoara)
—	FW	Moldova	Artiom Zabun (from (Moldova) Codru Lozova)

Out:

No.	Pos.	Nation	Player
—	DF	Romania	Dragoș Cojocaru (loan return to Voluntari, later signed by Free agent)
—	MF	Romania	Mihai Ene (loan return to Viitorul Constanța)
—	FW	Romania	Cristian Ene (loan return to Viitorul Constanța)
—	FW	Romania	Octavian Ursu (loan return to Universitatea Cluj, later signed by UTA Arad)
—	GK	Romania	Dalin Munteanu (to Free agent)
—	MF	Romania	Adrian Bedea (to Minaur Baia Mare)
—	MF	Romania	Răzvan Ghinescu (to Free agent, previously on loan to Ghiroda)
—	MF	Netherlands	Claudio Kiala (to Free agent, previously on loan to Lugoj)
—	FW	Romania	Ionuț Plămadă (to Bucovina Rădăuți)

=== Concordia Chiajna ===
In:

No.	Pos.	Nation	Player
—	GK	Romania	Alexandru Costache (loan return from Pandurii Târgu Jiu)
—	GK	Romania	Daniel Isvoranu (loan return from Daco-Getica București)
—	DF	Romania	Alin Dobrosavlevici (loan return from Dunărea Călărași)
—	DF	Romania	Vladimir Georgescu (loan return from Daco-Getica București)
—	DF	Romania	Andrei Marc (loan return from FCSB)
—	DF	Romania	Robert Riza (loan return from Metaloglobus București)
—	MF	Romania	Marian Ghiță (loan return from Balotești)
—	MF	Romania	Cristian Novacek (loan return from Alexandria)
—	DF	Romania	Andrei Dumitraș (from Botoșani)
—	DF	Romania	Vlad Olteanu (on loan from Dinamo București, previously on loan at ACS Poli Timișoara)
—	MF	Romania	Costin Ciucureanu (from Dacia Unirea Brăila)
—	MF	France	Yanis Hamzaoui (from (France) Chambly)
—	MF	Romania	Lucian Ion (from Sportul Snagov)
—	MF	Romania	Cristinel Matei (from Free agent)
—	MF	Romania	Cosmin Neagu (from Oțelul Galați)
—	MF	Romania	Andrei Tîrcoveanu (on loan from Viitorul Constanța)
—	FW	Romania	Paul Batin (from (Cyprus) Doxa Katokopias)
—	FW	Morocco	Bilal Bari (from (France) Lens)
—	FW	France	Romain Davigny (from (France) Jura Sud Foot)
—	FW	Romania	Alexandru Nica (from Petrolul Ploiești, previously on loan at Daco-Getica București)

Out:

No.	Pos.	Nation	Player
—	DF	Romania	Andrei Radu (loan return to CFR Cluj, later on loan to Politehnica Iași)
—	GK	Italy	Alessandro Caparco (to Dunărea Călărași)
—	GK	Romania	Victor Rîmniceanu (to Voluntari)
—	DF	Romania	Ștefan Bărboianu (to Petrolul Ploiești)
—	DF	Algeria	Liassine Cadamuro (to Free agent)
—	DF	Greece	Georgios Koutroumpis (to Free agent)
—	DF	Romania	Mihai Leca (to Chindia Târgoviște, previously on loan)
—	DF	Romania	Andrei Marc (on loan to FCSB)
—	DF	Romania	Gabriel Matei (to Academica Clinceni)
—	DF	Portugal	João Meira (to (Portugal) Vitória Setúbal)
—	MF	Romania	Cristian Balgiu (to SCM Gloria Buzău, previously on loan to Turris Turnu Măgurele)
—	MF	Romania	Valentin Bărbulescu (to CSA Steaua București, previously transferred from Sportul Snagov)
—	MF	Romania	George Cîmpanu (to Botoșani, previously on loan to Alexandria)
—	MF	Romania	Marian Cristescu (to SR Brașov)
—	MF	Argentina	Nicolás Gorobsov (to Voluntari)
—	MF	France	Jules Iloki (to Free agent)
—	MF	Cape Verde	Nivaldo (to Free agent)
—	MF	Romania	Daniel Rogoveanu (to FC U Craiova, previously on loan at ACS Poli Timișoara)
—	MF	Romania	Adrian Ropotan (to Free agent)
—	FW	Romania	Marius Alexe (to Free agent)
—	FW	Jordan	Tha'er Bawab (to Dunărea Călărași)
—	FW	Ivory Coast	Ghislain Guessan (to (Algeria) Bordj Bou Arréridj)
—	FW	Romania	Ovidiu Marin (to CSA Steaua București, previously on loan at Balotești)
—	FW	Tunisia	Sofien Moussa (to Botoșani)

=== CSM Reșița ===
In:

No.	Pos.	Nation	Player
—	GK	Romania	Adrian Horvat (from Național Sebiș)
—	DF	Ivory Coast	Lorenzo Acka (from (Italy) Delta Calcio Rovigo)
—	DF	Romania	Marco Ehmann (on loan from Dinamo București, previously on loan at Farul Constanța)
—	DF	Romania	Alexandru Manea (from UTA Arad)
—	DF	Romania	Bruno Vasiu (from Șoimii Lipova)
—	DF	Romania	Flavius Vlădia (from Ripensia Timișoara, previously on loan)
—	MF	Romania	Călin Cristea (from Oțelul Galați)
—	MF	Romania	Cristian Danci (from SCM Gloria Buzău)
—	MF	Romania	Emanuel Dat (from CFR II Cluj)
—	MF	Romania	Alin Lazăr (on loan from Dinamo București)
—	MF	Romania	Cristian Poiană (from Șoimii Lipova)
—	FW	Romania	Florin Cioablă (from Flacăra Horezu)
—	FW	Romania	Marius Coman (on loan from Universitatea Cluj)
—	FW	Romania	Gelu Velici (from (Hungary) Cigánd)

Out:

No.	Pos.	Nation	Player
—	FW	Romania	Dorin Toma (loan return to UTA Arad, previously on loan at CSM Reșița)
—	DF	Romania	Mario Albu (to Free agent)
—	DF	Romania	Sergiu Bactăr (to CSA Steaua București)
—	DF	Romania	Eduard Oprea (to Free agent)
—	DF	Romania	Hristos Vadasis (loan return to CSU II Craiova, later on loan at Rapid București)
—	MF	Romania	Cătălin Bagherea (to Free agent)
—	MF	Romania	Andrei Burciu (to Free agent)
—	MF	Romania	Robert Dalea (to Free agent)
—	MF	Romania	Cătălin Mierlici (to Free agent)
—	MF	Romania	Alexandru Roșca (to Free agent)
—	MF	Romania	Andrea Săndescu (to Free agent)
—	MF	Romania	Sebastian Velcotă (to ACS Poli Timișoara)
—	FW	Romania	Marius Musteța (to Free agent)
—	FW	Romania	Marius Staicu (to Ripensia Timișoara)

=== Daco-Getica București ===
In:

No.	Pos.	Nation	Player
—	GK	Romania	Răzvan Began (from ACS Poli Timișoara)
—	GK	Romania	Ionuț Gurău (from Viitorul Constanța, previously on loan at SCM Gloria Buzău)
—	DF	Romania	Bogdan Cuibari (from Free agent)
—	DF	Romania	Bogdan Jica (on loan from Gaz Metan Mediaș)
—	DF	Romania	Alexandru Socaci (on loan from Gaz Metan Mediaș)
—	DF	Romania	Alin Stoica (from CS Progresul)
—	DF	Romania	Andrei Voineag (from Balotești)
—	DF	Romania	Radu Zamfir (on loan from Dinamo București)
—	MF	Romania	Liviu Gheorghe (on loan from Dinamo București, previously on loan at Sportul Snagov)
—	MF	Romania	Andreas Iani (on loan from Viitorul Constanța, previously on loan at Farul Constanța)
—	MF	Romania	Mario Mihai (from Free agent)
—	MF	Romania	Marian Obreja (from Viitorul Domnești)
—	MF	Romania	Franco Paraschiv (from Balotești)
—	FW	Romania	Gabriel Răducan (on loan from Dinamo București)

Out:

No.	Pos.	Nation	Player
—	GK	Romania	Mihai Eșanu (loan return to Dinamo București)
—	GK	Romania	Daniel Isvoranu (loan return to Concordia Chiajna)
—	MF	Romania	Daniel Cîrjan (loan return to Viitorul Domnești)
—	MF	Romania	Vladimir Georgescu (loan return to Concordia Chiajna)
—	MF	Romania	Robert Grecu (loan return to Viitorul Constanța, later signed by Astra Giurgiu)
—	FW	Romania	Alexandru Nica (loan return to Petrolul Ploiești, later signed by Concordia Chiajna)
—	GK	Romania	George Gavrilaș (to Metaloglobus București)
—	GK	Romania	Teodor Meilă (to CSA Steaua București, previously transferred from Chindia Târgoviște)
—	DF	Romania	George Cotigă (to CSM Slatina)
—	DF	Romania	Vlad Motroc (to Argeș Pitești)
—	DF	Romania	Nicolae Mușat (to Argeș Pitești)
—	DF	Moldova	Ion Prodan (to Free agent)
—	DF	Romania	Tudor Țăranu (to Free agent)
—	MF	Romania	Cristian Bustea (to UTA Arad)
—	MF	Romania	George Călințaru (to Turris Turnu Măgurele)
—	MF	Romania	Arthur Teuț (to Comuna Recea)
—	FW	Romania	Mădălin Martin (to Free agent)
—	FW	France	Philippe Nsiah (to Academica Clinceni)

=== Dunărea Călărași ===
In:

No.	Pos.	Nation	Player
—	MF	Romania	Gabriel Preoteasa (loan return from Luceafărul Oradea)
—	DF	Romania	Ionuț Țenea (loan return from Aerostar Bacău)
—	GK	Moldova	Nicolae Calancea (from Academica Clinceni, previously signed by Academica Clinceni)
—	GK	Austria	Stefan Krell (from (Austria) Horn)
—	DF	Romania	Radu Crișan (from Astra Giurgiu)
—	DF	Uruguay	Ariel López (from (Spain) Inter de Madrid)
—	DF	Romania	Alin Mutu (from Aerostar Bacău)
—	DF	Switzerland	Ahmet Özcan (from Free agent)
—	DF	Romania	Alexandru Sabangeanu (on loan from Viitorul Constanța, previously on loan at Farul Constanța)
—	DF	Romania	Bogdan Șandru (from Chindia Târgoviște)
—	DF	Romania	Alexandru Sîrbu (on loan from CSU II Craiova)
—	MF	Romania	Robert Boboc (on loan from Astra Giurgiu, previously on loan at Mioveni)
—	MF	Romania	Ciprian Gliga (from Academica Clinceni)
—	MF	Romania	Salvatore Marrone (on loan from FCSB II, previously on loan at Academica Clinceni)
—	MF	Romania	Andrei Moise (from Agricola Borcea)
—	MF	Romania	Cristian Raiciu (from Pandurii Târgu Jiu)
—	MF	Romania	Andrei Zete (from CSU II Craiova)
—	FW	Jordan	Tha'er Bawab (from Concordia Chiajna)
—	FW	Cameroon	Serge Ekollo (on loan from Astra Giurgiu)
—	FW	Romania	Bogdan Rusu (from Hermannstadt, previously on loan at Petrolul Ploiești)
—	FW	Romania	Gabriel Toma (on loan from Rapid București)

Out:

No.	Pos.	Nation	Player
—	DF	Romania	Alin Dobrosavlevici (loan return to Concordia Chiajna)
—	DF	Romania	Ekrem Oltay (loan return to Dinamo București)
—	MF	Romania	Ștefan Pacionel (loan return to FCSB II, previously on loan at Farul Constanța)
—	DF	Romania	Gabriel Simion (loan return to FCSB, later on loan to Astra Giurgiu)
—	DF	Romania	Ștefan Vlădoiu (loan return to CS U Craiova)
—	MF	Romania	Daniel Benzar (loan return to FCSB, later signed by Voluntari)
—	MF	Romania	Gabriel Enache (loan return to (Serbia) Partizan)
—	FW	Romania	Cătălin Măgureanu (loan return to Dinamo București, later on loan at Afumați)
—	FW	Romania	Ianis Stoica (loan return to FCSB, later on loan to Petrolul Ploiești)
—	GK	Romania	Valentin Guță (on loan to Înainte Modelu)
—	GK	Romania	Cătălin Straton (to Dinamo București)
—	DF	Tunisia	Selim Ben Djemia (to Free agent)
—	DF	Romania	Steliano Filip (to Viitorul Constanța)
—	DF	North Macedonia	Filip Gligorov (to (Albania) Vllaznia Shkodër)
—	DF	Romania	Srdjan Luchin (to Hermannstadt)
—	DF	Romania	Silviu Matei (to Free agent, previously on loan at Oltenița)
—	DF	Romania	Constantin Nica (to Voluntari)
—	MF	Algeria	Najib Ammari (to Viitorul Constanța, later signed by Free agent)
—	MF	Romania	Alexandru Bourceanu (to Free agent)
—	MF	Romania	Stelian Cucu (to Free agent)
—	MF	Romania	Alexandru Dincă (to Free agent, previously on loan at SCM Gloria Buzău)
—	MF	Republic of Ireland	Conor Henderson (to (Bulgaria) Pirin Blagoevgrad)
—	MF	France	Hamidou Keyta (to Viitorul Constanța, later signed by Free agent)
—	MF	Romania	Laurențiu Manole (to Free agent, previously transferred from Voluntari)
—	MF	Romania	Alexandru Munteanu (to Petrolul Ploiești)
—	MF	Romania	Valentin Munteanu (to SCM Gloria Buzău)
—	MF	France	Abdelhakim Omrani (to Free agent)
—	MF	Romania	Costin Petre (on loan to Înainte Modelu)
—	FW	Romania	Valentin Alexandru (to SCM Gloria Buzău, previously on loan at Chindia Târgoviște)
—	FW	Romania	Gabriel Iancu (to Viitorul Constanța)
—	FW	Romania	Marc Khalil (to Free agent)
—	FW	DR Congo	Junior Mapuku (to (Iraq) Al-Shorta)
—	FW	Tunisia	Aymen Souda (to (Scotland) Livingston)

=== Farul Constanța ===
In:

No.	Pos.	Nation	Player
—	GK	Romania	Cristian Andrei (on loan from FCSB II, previously on loan at Academica Clinceni)
—	GK	Romania	Vlad Muțiu (from Dinamo București)
—	GK	Romania	Andrei Udeanu (from Oțelul Galați, previously on loan at Aerostar Bacău)
—	DF	Romania	Ștefan Cană (on loan from FCSB II)
—	DF	Romania	Iulian Carabela (from Aerostar Bacău)
—	DF	Romania	Viorel Lică (from Sportul Snagov)
—	DF	Romania	Dan Panait (on loan from Viitorul Constanța, previously on loan at Chindia Târgoviște)
—	DF	Romania	Radu Zamfir (on loan from FCSB II)
—	DF	Romania	Ionuț Ursu (from Sepsi Sfântu Gheorghe, previously on loan at Universitatea Cluj)
—	MF	Romania	Paul Antoche (from Petrolul Ploiești, previously on loan)
—	MF	Romania	Claudiu Băciuț (on loan from FCSB II)
—	MF	Romania	Antonio Cruceru (from Turris Turnu Măgurele)
—	MF	Romania	Răzvan Greu (from Universitatea Cluj)
—	MF	Romania	Denis Hordouan (from Universitatea Cluj)
—	MF	Romania	Baudoin Kanda (from UTA Arad)
—	MF	North Macedonia	Mihailo Mitrov (on loan from FCSB II, previously on loan at Academica Clinceni)
—	MF	Romania	Alexandru Nicola (on loan from FCSB II, previously on loan at Academica Clinceni)
—	MF	Romania	Patrick Petre (from Politehnica Iași)
—	MF	Romania	Alexandru Ionuț Stoica (on loan from Voluntari)
—	MF	Romania	Alexandru Iulian Stoica (on loan from Viitorul Constanța, previously on loan at Petrolul Ploiești)
—	FW	Romania	Alexandru Bodea (on loan from FCSB II)

Out:

No.	Pos.	Nation	Player
—	DF	Romania	Marco Ehmann (loan return to Dinamo București, later on loan to CSM Reșița)
—	DF	Romania	Robert Neciu (loan return to Viitorul Constanța, later on loan to Chindia Târgoviște)
—	DF	Romania	Alexandru Sabangeanu (loan return to Viitorul Constanța)
—	MF	Romania	Andreas Iani (loan return to Viitorul Constanța, later on loan at Daco-Getica București)
—	MF	Romania	Adrian Juncu (loan return to CS U II Craiova)
—	MF	Romania	Ștefan Pacionel (loan return to FCSB II, later on loan to Dunărea Călărași)
—	GK	Romania	Raul Avram (to Petrolul Ploiești)
—	GK	Romania	Gabriel Frunză (to Free agent)
—	GK	Romania	Mihai Popa (to Free agent)
—	DF	Turkey	Arif Demir (to Free agent)
—	DF	Portugal	João Diogo (to (Slovakia) Spartak Trnava)
—	DF	Romania	Denis Ispas (to Turris Turnu Măgurele)
—	DF	Romania	Mihai Șandru (to Progresul Spartac București)
—	MF	Cape Verde	Pedro Celestino (to Free agent)
—	MF	Romania	Marius Fotescu (to Ripensia Timișoara)
—	MF	Portugal	Diogo Rosado (to Free agent)
—	FW	Romania	Alexandru Grigoraș (to Free agent)
—	FW	Romania	Alexandru Moise (to Unirea Slobozia)
—	FW	Romania	Georgian Păun (to Free agent)
—	FW	Portugal	Rafa (to Universitatea Cluj)
—	FW	Romania	Romeo Surdu (to SR Brașov)

=== Metaloglobus București ===
In:

No.	Pos.	Nation	Player
—	GK	Romania	George Gavrilaș (from Daco-Getica București)
—	GK	Romania	Cristian Nedelcovici (from Astra Giurgiu)
—	DF	Romania	Iulian Ciubotaru (from Știința Miroslava)
—	DF	Romania	Alexandru Coman (from Universitatea Cluj)
—	DF	Romania	Daniel Lung (from Viitorul Târgu Jiul)
—	DF	Moldova	Alexandru Starîș (from Free agent)
—	MF	Romania	Paulian Banu (on loan from Astra II)
—	MF	Romania	Lucian Cazan (from Petrolul Ploiești)
—	MF	Romania	Radu Chiriac (on loan from Astra Giurgiu)
—	MF	Romania	Alexandru Ciocâlteu (from Aerostar Bacău)
—	MF	Romania	Alexandru Duminică (on loan from Astra II)
—	FW	Romania	Cosmin Ionică (from Viitorul Târgu Jiul)

Out:

No.	Pos.	Nation	Player
—	DF	Romania	Robert Riza (loan return to Concordia Chiajna)
—	MF	Romania	Constantin Costache (loan return to Voluntari)
—	MF	Romania	Raul Negotei (loan return to Dinamo București, later signed by SR Brașov)
—	MF	Romania	Vlăduț Vlad (loan return to Dinamo București)
—	GK	Romania	Florin Iacob (to UTA Arad)
—	DF	Romania	George Caramalău (to Free agent)
—	DF	Romania	Gabriel Frîncu (to Free agent)
—	DF	Romania	Marius Tomozei (to UTA Arad)
—	MF	Romania	Gigel Coman (Retired)
—	MF	Romania	Andrei Ionescu (to Free agent)
—	MF	Romania	Alexandru Neagu (to Ripensia Timișoara)â
—	MF	Romania	Ștefan Niculae (to Free agent)

=== Miercurea Ciuc ===
In:

No.	Pos.	Nation	Player
—	GK	Montenegro	Damir Ljuljanović (from (Montenegro) Titograd)
—	DF	Hungary	Bonifác Csonka (from (Hungary) Puskás Akadémia, previously on loan at (Hungary) Csákvár)
—	DF	Hungary	Ákos Fodor (from (Hungary) Dorog)
—	DF	Romania	Raul Palmeș (from (Hungary) Budapest Honvéd, previously on loan at (Hungary) Kazincbarcika)
—	MF	Hungary	Csongor Simó (from (Hungary) Csenger)
—	MF	Romania	Carlo Erdei (from (Hungary) Balmazújváros)
—	MF	Hungary	Szilárd Kálmán (from (Hungary) Pécs)
—	MF	Hungary	Martin Takács (from (Hungary) Fehérvár II)
—	FW	Spain	Raúl Juliá (from (Spain) Sant Rafel)
—	FW	England	Romaric Logon (from Odorheiu Secuiesc)

Out:

No.	Pos.	Nation	Player
—	GK	Romania	Zsombor Papp (to Free agent)
—	GK	Hungary	Pál Somogyi (to Free agent, previously on loan to Odorheiu Secuiesc)
—	DF	Romania	Barna Antal (to (Serbia) TSC Bačka Topola)
—	DF	Romania	Csongor Berkeczi (on loan to Odorheiu Secuiesc)
—	DF	Hungary	Soma Casiadi (to Free agent)
—	DF	Romania	Szabolcs Kovács (on loan to Hunedoara, previously on loan to Unirea Dej)
—	DF	Hungary	Zsolt Nagy (to Free agent)
—	DF	Hungary	Milán Nemes (to Free agent)
—	DF	Romania	Norbert Papp (to Free agent)
—	DF	Romania	Lehel Solymosy (to Odorheiu Secuiesc)
—	DF	Romania	Zsolt Zsombori (on loan to Odorheiu Secuiesc)
—	MF	Romania	Arthur Györgyi (to Free agent)
—	MF	Romania	Kristóf Pál (on loan to Odorheiu Secuiesc)
—	FW	Romania	Ottó Csegőldi (to Free agent)
—	FW	Serbia	Nikola Pantović (to Free agent)

=== Mioveni ===
In:

No.	Pos.	Nation	Player
—	DF	Romania	Alexandru Mierlea (loan return from Real Bradu)
—	MF	Romania	Bogdan Arsenică (loan return from Unirea Bascov)
—	MF	Romania	Raul Drugă (loan return from Olimpic Cetate Râșnov)
—	DF	Romania	Marian Anghelina (from Ripensia Timișoara)
—	MF	Romania	Raul Costin (from Argeș Pitești)
—	FW	Italy	Davide Massaro (from (San Marino) Tre Fiori)

Out:

No.	Pos.	Nation	Player
—	DF	Romania	Szabolcs Kilyen (loan return to Viitorul Constanța, later on loan to Sepsi Sfântu Gheorghe)
—	MF	Romania	Robert Boboc (loan return to Astra Giurgiu, later on loan at Dunărea Călărași)
—	MF	Romania	Marian Șerban (loan return to CSU II Craiova)
—	GK	Romania	Marius Călinoiu (to Unirea Bascov)
—	DF	Romania	Alexandru Dumitrache (to Unirea Bascov)
—	DF	Romania	Antonio Ristea (to Sportul Snagov)
—	MF	Brazil	Roberto Ayza (to Muscelul Câmpulung)
—	MF	Romania	Ovidiu Comănescu (to Unirea Bascov, previously on loan)
—	MF	Romania	Rareș Lazăr (to Rapid București)
—	MF	Romania	Ionuț Mîrzeanu (to Free agent)
—	FW	Romania	Sebastian Ivan (to Unirea Bascov, previously on loan)

=== Pandurii Târgu Jiu ===
In:

No.	Pos.	Nation	Player
—	GK	Romania	Iulian Dinu (from Universitatea Cluj)
—	DF	Romania	Paul Chiș (from Sticla Arieșul Turda)
—	DF	Romania	Bogdan Vișan (from CSA Steaua București)
—	MF	England	Ludovic Erhard (from (Scotland) East Stirlingshire)
—	MF	Japan	Takahashi Kazuki (from FC U Craiova)
—	MF	Romania	Adrian Nichifor (from CSU II Craiova)
—	MF	China	Lü Yuefeng (from CFR II Cluj, previously on loan at Luceafărul Oradea)
—	FW	Romania	Daniel Unguru (from Filiași)

Out:

No.	Pos.	Nation	Player
—	GK	Romania	Alexandru Costache (loan return to Concordia Chiajna)
—	FW	Romania	Gabriel Dodoi (loan return to CFR Cluj, later signed by Rapid București)
—	DF	Romania	Marius Almic (on loan to Filiași)
—	DF	Romania	Denis Brînzan (to Argeș Pitești)
—	DF	Romania	Robert Dănescu (to Argeș Pitești)
—	DF	Serbia	Miloš Drača (to Free agent)
—	MF	Romania	Cristian Raiciu (to Dunărea Călărași)
—	MF	Romania	Laurențiu Tudor (to Free agent)
—	MF	Romania	George Tudoran (to Rapid București)
—	MF	Romania	Alexadru Vodă (to Hermannstadt)
—	FW	Romania	Andrei Blejdea (to Argeș Pitești)

=== Petrolul Ploiești ===
In:

No.	Pos.	Nation	Player
—	GK	Moldova	Cristian Apostolachi (from SCM Gloria Buzău)
—	GK	Romania	Raul Avram (from Farul Constanța)
—	DF	Romania	Ștefan Bărboianu (from Concordia Chiajna)
—	DF	Moldova	Petru Racu (from (Azerbaijan) Neftçi)
—	DF	Romania	Cristian Sîrghi (from Dunărea Călărași)
—	DF	Brazil	Walace (from (Egypt) Al Ittihad Alexandria)
—	MF	Romania	Ionuț Cioinac (from Politehnica Iași)
—	MF	Romania	Gabriel Deac (from Voluntari)
—	MF	Romania	Bogdan Gavrilă (from (Malta) Valletta)
—	MF	Romania	Antonio Manolache (from ACS Poli Timișoara)
—	MF	Paraguay	David Meza (from Free agent)
—	MF	Romania	Mădălin Mihăescu (from Politehnica Iași)
—	MF	Romania	Alexandru Munteanu (from Dunărea Călărași)
—	MF	Romania	Cătălin Ștefănescu (from Politehnica Iași, previously on loan)
—	MF	Romania	Alexandru Zaharia (from Politehnica Iași)
—	FW	Romania	Ștefan Blănaru (from Hermannstadt)
—	FW	France	Guy Gnabouyou (from (Greece) Iraklis)
—	FW	Romania	Ianis Stoica (on loan from FCSB, previously on loan at Dunărea Călărași)
—	FW	Tunisia	Hamza Younés (from (Greece) Aris Thessaloniki)

Out:

No.	Pos.	Nation	Player
—	GK	Moldova	Ianoș Brînză (loan return to Botoșani)
—	DF	Romania	Florin Borța (loan return to CS U Craiova)
—	MF	Romania	Alexandru Stoica (loan return to Viitorul Constanța, later on loan to Farul Constanța)
—	FW	Romania	Robert Moldoveanu (loan return to Dinamo București)
—	FW	Romania	Bogdan Rusu (loan return to Hermannstadt, later signed by Dunărea Călărași)
—	GK	Romania	Mirel Bolboașă (to UTA Arad)
—	DF	Romania	Andrei Iacob (on loan to Blejoi)
—	DF	Romania	Alberto Olaru (on loan to Blejoi)
—	DF	Romania	Jean Prunescu (to Minaur Baia Mare, previously on loan at Dacia Unirea Brăila)
—	DF	Romania	Andrei Rus (on loan to CSM Reșița, previously on loan at SCM Gloria Buzău)
—	DF	Greece	Georgios Sarris (to Free agent)
—	DF	Romania	Alexandru Țigănașu (to Botoșani)
—	DF	Romania	Mihai Velisar (on loan to Gaz Metan Mediaș, previously on loan at SCM Gloria Buzău)
—	MF	Romania	Paul Antoche (to Farul Constanța, previously on loan)
—	MF	Romania	Dan Bucșa (to Free agent)
—	MF	Romania	Raul Bucur (on loan to Sportul Snagov)
—	MF	Romania	Lucian Cazan (to Metaloglobus București)
—	MF	Romania	Marius Chindriș (to CSM Târgu Mureș)
—	MF	Romania	Sebastian Ghinga (to SCM Gloria Buzău)
—	MF	Greece	Chrysovalantis Kozoronis (to Free agent)
—	MF	Armenia	Edgar Malakyan (to (Armenia) Shirak)
—	MF	Romania	Nini Popescu (to Argeș Pitești)
—	MF	Romania	Cristian Pușcaș (to UTA Arad)
—	FW	Romania	Alexandru Nica (to Concordia Chiajna, previously on loan at Daco-Getica București)

=== Rapid București ===
In:

No.	Pos.	Nation	Player
—	MF	Uruguay	Facundo Piriz (from (France) Montpellier HSC)
—	DF	Dominican Republic	Tano Bonnin (from (Spain) Almería)
—	DF	Uruguay	Facundo Mallo (from Dinamo București)
—	DF	Romania	Hristos Vadasis (on loan from CSU II Craiova, previously on loan at CSM Reșița)
—	MF	Morocco	Saifeddine Alami (from (Morocco) Raja Casablanca)
—	MF	Romania	Geani Crețu (on loan from Dinamo București)
—	MF	Austria	Sandro Djurić (from Austria Lustenau)
—	MF	Romania	Alexandru Dulca (from Luceafărul Oradea)
—	MF	Romania	Amir Jorza (from UTA Arad, previously on loan)
—	MF	Romania	Rareș Lazăr (from Mioveni)
—	FW	Romania	Gabriel Dodoi (from CFR Cluj, previously on loan at Pandurii Târgu Jiu)
—	FW	France	Brighton Labeau (from Free agent)
—	FW	Argentina	Matías Roskopf (from Hermannstadt)

Out:

No.	Pos.	Nation	Player
—	GK	Romania	Ștefan Ciuculescu (to Free agent)
—	GK	Romania	Valentin Mărgărit (to Free agent)
—	DF	Romania	Vlad Mocioacă (on loan to Sportul Snagov)
—	DF	Romania	Adrian Neacșu (on loan to Sportul Snagov)
—	MF	Romania	Alexandru Duriță (to Free agent)
—	MF	Romania	Adrian Grigore (to Flacăra Moreni)
—	MF	Romania	Adrian Nițu (to Free agent)
—	MF	Romania	George Tudoran (to Free agent, previously transferred from Pandurii Târgu Jiu)
—	MF	Romania	Alin Turbatu (to Sportul Snagov, previously on loan to Progresul Spartac București)
—	FW	Lithuania	Deivydas Matulevičius (to (Lithuania) Kauno Žalgiris)
—	FW	Brazil	Robinho (to Free agent)
—	FW	Romania	Gabriel Toma (on loan to Dunărea Călărași)
—	FW	Romania	Marian Vlada (to CSM Slatina)

=== Ripensia Timișoara ===
In:

No.	Pos.	Nation	Player
—	MF	Romania	Răzvan Cluci (loan return from Ghiroda)
—	GK	Romania	Haralambie Mociu (from Viitorul Constanța, previously on loan at Medgidia)
—	DF	Romania	Caius Lungu (from (Italy) Colorno Calcio)
—	MF	Romania	Tudor Călin (from Sepsi OSK Sfântu Gheorghe, previously on loan at Luceafărul Oradea)
—	MF	Romania	Marius Fotescu (from Farul Constanța)
—	MF	Romania	Nafi Iseini (from ACS Poli Timișoara)
—	MF	Romania	George Monea (from Hermannstadt, previously on loan)
—	MF	Romania	Alexandru Neagu (from Metaloglobus București)
—	MF	Romania	Vlad Tudorache (from Viitorul Târgu Jiul)
—	FW	Romania	Denis Golda (from ACS Poli Timișoara)
—	FW	Romania	Marius Staicu (from CSM Reșița)
—	FW	Romania	Albert Voinea (from Dumbrăvița)

Out:

No.	Pos.	Nation	Player
—	MF	Romania	Vlad Chera (loan return to Viitorul Constanța)
—	GK	Romania	Horațiu Moldovan (to Sepsi Sfântu Gheorghe)
—	DF	Romania	Marian Anghelina (to Mioveni)
—	DF	Romania	Bogdan Străuț (to Dumbrăvița)
—	DF	Romania	Flavius Vlădia (to CSM Reșița, previously on loan)
—	MF	Romania	Adrian Ungureanu (to ASU Politehnica Timișoara)
—	FW	Romania	Octavian Drăghici (to Dumbrăvița)
—	FW	Romania	Andrei Dumiter (to Sepsi Sfântu Gheorghe)
—	FW	Senegal	Mansour Gueye (to Flacăra Horezu)
—	FW	Romania	Constantin Stoica (to Sportul Snagov)

=== SCM Gloria Buzău ===
In:

No.	Pos.	Nation	Player
—	GK	Romania	Dragoș Balauru (from (Greece) Levadiakos)
—	GK	Romania	Relu Stoian (from Sepsi Sfântu Gheorghe)
—	DF	Romania	Alexandru Gîț (from Sportul Snagov)
—	DF	Romania	Marius Ioniță (from Viitorul Târgu Jiul)
—	DF	Romania	Gabriel Nedelea (on loan from Viitorul Constanța)
—	DF	Romania	Ciprian Perju (from Viitorul Constanța, previously on loan at Afumați)
—	MF	Romania	Cristian Balgiu (from Concordia Chiajna, previously on loan at Turris Turnu Măgurele)
—	MF	Romania	Sebastian Ghinga (from Petrolul Ploiești)
—	MF	Romania	Dragoș Huiban (from Sportul Snagov)
—	MF	Slovakia	Branislav Ľupták (from (Slovakia) Ružomberok, previously on loan at Zlaté Moravce)
—	MF	Romania	Valentin Munteanu (from Dunărea Călărași)
—	MF	Romania	Adelin Pîrcălabu (from Voluntari)
—	MF	Romania	Cosmin Tucaliuc (on loan from Viitorul Constanța)
—	MF	Romania	Daniel Vîlsan (on loan from Sport Team București)
—	FW	Romania	Valentin Alexandru (from Dunărea Călărași, previously on loan at Chindia Târgoviște)
—	FW	Romania	Liviu Godin (on loan from Sport Team București)

Out:

No.	Pos.	Nation	Player
—	GK	Romania	Ionuț Gurău (loan return to Viitorul Constanța, later signed by Daco-Getica București)
—	DF	Romania	Mădălin Androne (loan return to Viitorul Constanța)
—	DF	Romania	Andrei Rus (loan return to Petrolul Ploiești, later on loan at CSM Reșița)
—	DF	Romania	Mihai Velisar (loan return to Petrolul Ploiești, later signed by Free agent)
—	MF	Romania	Alexandru Dincă (loan return to Dunărea Călărași)
—	GK	Moldova	Cristian Apostolachi (to Petrolul Ploiești)
—	GK	Romania	Cristian Chirițescu (to Free agent)
—	DF	Romania	Marian Botea (to Free agent)
—	DF	Romania	Marius Drăguț (to Free agent)
—	DF	Romania	Robert Manea (to Free agent)
—	DF	Romania	Costin Pușcă (to Free agent)
—	MF	Romania	Robert Asăvoaei (to Free agent)
—	MF	Romania	Andrei Cîmpeanu (to Free agent)
—	MF	Romania	Cristian Danci (to CSM Reșița)
—	MF	Romania	Dănuț Oprea (to Free agent)
—	MF	Romania	Ciprian Petre (Retired)
—	MF	Romania	Mădălin Pușcă (to Free agent)
—	MF	Romania	Ionuț Roman (to Free agent)
—	FW	Romania	Bogdan Danciu (to Unirea Slobozia)
—	FW	Cape Verde	Edivândio (to Free agent)
—	FW	Romania	Andrei Truță (to Free agent)

=== Sportul Snagov ===
In:

No.	Pos.	Nation	Player
—	GK	Romania	George Micle (on loan from FCSB II)
—	GK	Romania	Octavian Stanciu (from Carmen București)
—	GK	Romania	Ionuț Vreme (from Viitorul Domnești)
—	DF	Romania	Ionuț Baniță (from Viitorul Domnești)
—	DF	Romania	Doru Bratu (from Carmen București)
—	DF	Romania	Alin Ghidurea (from ACS Poli Timișoara)
—	DF	Romania	Vlad Mocioacă (on loan from Rapid București)
—	DF	Romania	Adrian Neacșu (on loan from Rapid București)
—	DF	Romania	Cristian Poștoarcă (from Național Sebiș)
—	DF	Romania	Antonio Ristea (from Mioveni)
—	MF	Romania	George Apostol (from Progresul Spartac București)
—	MF	Romania	Raul Bucur (on loan from Petrolul Ploiești)
—	MF	Romania	Adrian Dorobanțu (from Free agent)
—	MF	Romania	Narcis Ioniță (from Carmen București)
—	MF	Romania	Florin Lungu (from Carmen București)
—	MF	Romania	Andrei Mirică (from Cetate Deva)
—	MF	Romania	Alexandru Nichita (from Carmen București)
—	MF	Romania	Cosmin Novac (from Viitorul Domnești)
—	MF	Romania	Mădălin Răileanu (from Astra Giurgiu, previously on loan at Metalul Buzău)
—	MF	Romania	Iulian Roșu (from Free agent)
—	MF	Romania	Alin Turbatu (from Rapid București)
—	FW	Romania	Iulian Ilie (from Free agent)
—	FW	Romania	Alexandru Rusu (from Petrosport Ploiești)
—	FW	Romania	Giani Stere (from ACS Poli Timișoara)
—	FW	Romania	Constantin Stoica (from Ripensia Timișoara)

Out:

No.	Pos.	Nation	Player
—	GK	Romania	Ștefan Târnovanu (loan return to Politehnica Iași)
—	MF	Romania	Liviu Gheorghe (loan return to Dinamo București)
—	MF	Romania	Laurențiu Manole (loan return to Voluntari, later signed by Dunărea Călărași)
—	FW	Romania	Vlad Danale (loan return to Politehnica Iași, later on loan at Aerostar Bacău)
—	GK	Congo	M'Sendo Kololo (to Free agent)
—	GK	Romania	Andrei Marinescu (to CS U Craiova)
—	DF	Romania	Mihai Ciobanu (to Free agent)
—	DF	Romania	Alexandru Gîț (to SCM Gloria Buzău)
—	DF	Romania	Florin Ilie (to UTA Arad)
—	DF	Romania	Viorel Lică (to Farul Constanța)
—	DF	Romania	Bogdan Stancu (to UTA Arad)
—	DF	Romania	Ioan Șerban (to Olimpic Cetate Râșnov)
—	MF	France	Bilel Aït Malek (to (Tunisia) Stade Tunisien)
—	MF	Romania	Valentin Bărbulescu (to Concordia Chiajna, later signed by CSA Steaua București)
—	MF	Romania	Claudiu Borțoneanu (to Voluntari)
—	MF	Romania	Darius Buia (to CSM Târgu Mureș)
—	MF	Romania	Paul Cubleșan (to Free agent)
—	MF	Romania	Dragoș Huiban (to SCM Gloria Buzău)
—	MF	Romania	Lucian Ion (to Concordia Chiajna)
—	MF	Romania	Silvian Matei (to Progresul Spartac București, previously transferred from (Italy) Crema)
—	MF	Romania	Yasin Mohammed (to Free agent)
—	MF	Romania	Viorel Nicoară (to Free agent)
—	MF	France	Ayoub Tazouti (to Free agent)
—	FW	Romania	Cristian Dănălache (to CSA Steaua București)
—	FW	Romania	Róbert Elek (to CSA Steaua București)
—	FW	Romania	Alexandru Ioniță (to UTA Arad)

=== Turris Turnu Măgurele ===
In:

No.	Pos.	Nation	Player
—	GK	Romania	David Duțu (from Popești-Leordeni)
—	GK	Romania	Florin Matache (from Flacăra Horezu)
—	GK	Romania	Aurelian Păun (from CFR II Cluj)
—	GK	Romania	Ionuț Rus (from CFR Cluj, previously on loan at Luceafărul Oradea)
—	DF	Romania	Denis Ispas (from Farul Constanța)
—	DF	Romania	Cătălin Pârvulescu (from Hermannstadt)
—	MF	Togo	Charles Acolatse (from (North Macedonia) Sileks)
—	MF	Romania	Alin Buleică (from Argeș Pitești)
—	MF	Romania	George Călințaru (from Daco-Getica București)
—	MF	Romania	Angel Ciutică (from CSU II Craiova)
—	MF	Romania	Florian Haită (on loan from Viitorul Constanța)
—	MF	Romania	Alexandru Mitracu (from Tunari)
—	MF	Romania	Silviu Pană (from Free agent)
—	MF	Romania	Paul Pațircă (from Academica Clinceni)
—	FW	Romania	Cristian Bud (from CFR Cluj)
—	FW	Bosnia and Herzegovina	Nedo Turković (from (Malta) Qormi)

Out:

No.	Pos.	Nation	Player
—	MF	Romania	Cristian Balgiu (loan return to Concordia Chiajna, later signed by SCM Gloria Buzău)
—	MF	Romania	Mihnea Vlad (loan return to Dinamo București)
—	GK	Romania	Dragoș Dumitrescu (to Hunedoara)
—	GK	Romania	Ionuț Poiană (to Free agent)
—	DF	Romania	Robert Bolozan (to Free agent)
—	DF	Romania	Bogdan Matei (to Free agent)
—	DF	Romania	Ionuț Moldovan (to Free agent)
—	MF	Romania	Liviu Băjenaru (to CSA Steaua București)
—	MF	Romania	Antonio Cruceru (to Farul Constanța)
—	MF	Romania	Gabriel Mărioara (to Free agent)
—	MF	Romania	Marius Pahonțu (to Free agent)
—	MF	Romania	Alin Pencea (to Focșani)
—	MF	Romania	Florin Radu (to Free agent)
—	FW	Romania	Claudiu Dragu (to FC U Craiova)
—	FW	Romania	Remus Trancă (to Free agent)

=== Universitatea Cluj ===
In:

No.	Pos.	Nation	Player
—	GK	Romania	Árpád Tordai (on loan from Viitorul Constanța)
—	DF	Moldova	Artur Crăciun (from (Moldova) Milsami Orhei)
—	DF	Romania	Renato Imbrea (from (Italy) Venezia)
—	DF	Cape Verde	Kay (from (Slovakia) Senica)
—	DF	Portugal	Inácio Miguel (from (Portugal) Braga B)
—	DF	Portugal	Tiago Gomes (from (Portugal) Feirense)
—	MF	Portugal	André Ceitil (from (Portugal) Leixões)
—	MF	Romania	Victor Dican (from Metalurgistul Cugir)
—	MF	Romania	Vlad Mihalcea (from Voluntari)
—	FW	Portugal	Hugo Firmino (from (Portugal) Cova da Piedade)
—	FW	Romania	Alexandru Pop (from Viitorul Constanța)
—	FW	Portugal	Rafa (from Farul Constanța)

Out:

No.	Pos.	Nation	Player
—	DF	Romania	Tiberiu Căpușă (loan return to Viitorul Constanța)
—	DF	Romania	Ionuț Ursu (loan return to Sepsi Sfântu Gheorghe, later signed by Farul Constanța)
—	MF	Romania	Doru Dumitrescu (loan return to Viitorul Constanța)
—	MF	Romania	Norbert János (loan return to (Hungary) Ferencváros, later signed by Comuna Recea)
—	MF	Ghana	Kofi Twumasi (loan return to Viitorul Constanța)
—	GK	Portugal	José Costa (to Free agent, previously transferred from (Portugal) Penafiel)
—	GK	Romania	Iulian Dinu (to Pandurii Târgu Jiu)
—	GK	Romania	Rareș Pop (to Sticla Arieșul Turda, previously on loan)
—	DF	Romania	Octavian Abrudan (Retired)
—	DF	Romania	Alexandru Coman (to Metaloglobus București)
—	DF	Romania	Andrei Cordoș (to (Lithuania) Žalgiris)
—	DF	Romania	László Sepsi (to Free agent)
—	MF	Romania	Sebastian Chitoșcă (to CSA Steaua București)
—	MF	Romania	Andrei Cobârzan (on loan to Sticla Arieșul Turda)
—	MF	Romania	Gabriel Giurgiu (Retired)
—	MF	Romania	Răzvan Greu (to Farul Constanța)
—	MF	Romania	Denis Hordouan (to Farul Constanța)
—	MF	Portugal	Pedro Mendes (to (Hong Kong) Southern District FC, previously transferred from Gaz Metan Mediaș)
—	MF	Romania	Adrian Micaș (to Comuna Recea, previously on loan)
—	FW	Romania	Mircea Axente (to ASU Politehnica Timișoara)
—	FW	Romania	Marius Coman (on loan to CSM Reșița)
—	FW	Romania	Iuliu Hațiegan (to Politehnica Iași)
—	FW	Romania	Octavian Ursu (to UTA Arad, previously on loan at ASU Politehnica)

=== UTA Arad ===
In:

No.	Pos.	Nation	Player
—	GK	Romania	Marinel Creța (loan return from Șoimii Lipova)
—	GK	Romania	Denis Mureșan (loan return from Victoria Zăbrani)
—	DF	Romania	Sergiu Aldan (loan return from Progresul Pecica)
—	DF	Romania	Denis Dardai (loan return from Șoimii Lipova)
—	DF	Romania	Răzvan Onuțan (loan return from Național Sebiș)
—	DF	Romania	Flavius Rogojan (loan return from Gloria L-T. Cermei)
—	DF	Romania	Raul Iova (loan return from Progresul Pecica)
—	MF	Romania	Călin Gruiescu (loan return from Gloria L-T. Cermei)
—	MF	Romania	Alexandru Lezeu (loan return from Crișul Chișineu-Criș)
—	MF	Romania	Rareș Deta (loan return from Gloria L-T. Cermei)
—	MF	Romania	Raul Moraru (loan return from Progresul Pecica)
—	FW	Romania	Daniel Bulza (loan return from Gloria L-T. Cermei)
—	GK	Romania	Mirel Bolboașă (from Petrolul Ploiești)
—	GK	Romania	Florin Iacob (from Metaloglobus București)
—	DF	Romania	Florin Ilie (from Sportul Snagov)
—	DF	Romania	Andrei Rus (on loan from Petrolul Ploiești, previously on loan at CSM Reșița)
—	DF	Romania	Bogdan Stancu (from Sportul Snagov)
—	DF	Romania	Marius Tomozei (from Metaloglobus București)
—	MF	Romania	Cristian Bustea (from Daco-Getica București)
—	MF	Brazil	Diego Lorenzi (from (Brazil) Santa Cruz)
—	MF	Romania	Romario Moise (on loan from Astra Giurgiu)
—	MF	Romania	Cristian Pușcaș (from Petrolul Ploiești)
—	FW	Romania	Valentin Buhăcianu (from Aerostar Bacău)
—	FW	Romania	Alexandru Ioniță (from Sportul Snagov)
—	FW	Romania	Octavian Ursu (from Universitatea Cluj, previously on loan at ASU Politehnica)

Out:

No.	Pos.	Nation	Player
—	GK	Romania	Roberto Bodea (to Free agent)
—	GK	Austria	Miroslav Orlic (to Free agent)
—	DF	Romania	Toma Bodri (to CSM Slatina, previously on loan at Progresul Pecica)
—	DF	Romania	Paul Copaci (to Astra Giurgiu)
—	DF	Tunisia	Oualid El Hasni (to (Tunisia) Stade Tunisien)
—	DF	Romania	Rafael Iuga (to Free agent)
—	DF	Romania	Alexandru Manea (to CSM Reșița)
—	DF	Senegal	Benga Samba (to (Finland) Ekenäs)
—	MF	Romania	Luca Bodri (to CSM Slatina, previously on loan at Progresul Pecica)
—	MF	Romania	Cristian Costin (to Voluntari)
—	MF	Romania	Alexandru Hațegan (on loan to Șoimii Lipova)
—	MF	Romania	Amir Jorza (to Rapid București, previously on loan)
—	MF	Romania	Baudoin Kanda (to Farul Constanța)
—	MF	Romania	Ionuț Neagu (to (Bulgaria) Cherno More)
—	MF	Romania	Victor Prună (to Șoimii Lipova, previously on loan to Gloria L-T. Cermei)
—	MF	Romania	Albert Stahl (to Astra Giurgiu)
—	MF	Romania	Michel Vlad (to Șoimii Lipova, previously on loan to Gloria L-T. Cermei)
—	FW	Romania	David Popa (to (Finland) Kajaani)
—	FW	Romania	Dorin Toma (to CSM Slatina, previously on loan at CSM Reșița)

=== Viitorul Târgu Jiu ===
In:

No.	Pos.	Nation	Player
—	GK	Romania	Iulian Anca-Trip (from Botoșani)
—	GK	Romania	Dragoș Bălan (from Free agent)
—	GK	Romania	Bogdan Moga (from Luceafărul Oradea)
—	DF	Romania	Alexandru Băican (from Luceafărul Oradea)
—	DF	Romania	Adrian Ciul (from Luceafărul Oradea)
—	DF	Romania	Dacian Dunca (from Comuna Recea)
—	DF	Romania	Cristian Oroș (from Luceafărul Oradea)
—	DF	Romania	Bogdan Porumb (on loan from Ardealul Cluj, previously on loan at Sănătatea Cluj)
—	DF	Burkina Faso	François Yabré (from Luceafărul Oradea)
—	MF	Romania	Marius Balogh (from Crișul Sântandrei)
—	MF	Romania	Darius Buia (from Sportul Snagov)
—	MF	Romania	Sebastian Chelariu (from Sănătatea Cluj)
—	MF	Romania	Paul Chiorean (from Luceafărul Oradea)
—	MF	Romania	Raul Hăjmășan (from Gaz Metan Mediaș)
—	MF	Romania	Alexandru Negrean (on loan from Viitorul Constanța)
—	MF	Romania	Mark Parnău (from Unirea Tășnad)
—	DF	Romania	Vlad Prejmerean (from Luceafărul Oradea)
—	FW	Romania	Victoraș Astafei (from CSM Târgu Mureș)
—	FW	Romania	Alexandru Bădăuță (from ACS Poli Timișoara)
—	FW	Romania	Alexandru Pop (from Aerostar Bacău)
—	FW	Romania	Vasile Pop (from Luceafărul Oradea)

Out:

No.	Pos.	Nation	Player
—	GK	Romania	Teodor Axinte (loan return to Politehnica Iași, later on loan at Aerostar Bacău)
—	GK	Romania	Cristian Dică (loan return to CSU II Craiova)
—	DF	Romania	Remus Enache (loan return to CSU II Craiova)
—	DF	Romania	Robert Petre (loan return to CS U Craiova)
—	MF	Romania	Claudiu Petruș (loan return to CFR II Cluj, later signed by Free agent)
—	FW	Romania	Alexandru Petruș (loan return to CFR II Cluj, later signed by Free agent)
—	FW	Romania	Alexandru Popescu (loan return to CS U Craiova, later on loan at Academica Clinceni)
—	GK	Moldova	Victor Buga (to Free agent)
—	GK	Romania	Alexandru Marinoiu (to Viitorul Dăești)
—	DF	Romania	Ionuț Gruia (to Free agent)
—	DF	Burkina Faso	Ismael Guiti (to Free agent)
—	DF	Romania	Marius Ioniță (to SCM Gloria Buzău)
—	DF	Romania	Daniel Lung (to Metaloglobus București)
—	DF	Romania	Alexandru Misarăș (to Free agent)
—	DF	Romania	Adrian Voicu (to Free agent)
—	MF	Romania	Narcis Cârlig (to Free agent)
—	MF	Kosovo	Drilon Cenaj (to Free agent)
—	MF	Romania	Răzvan Gunie (on loan to Luceafărul Oradea)
—	MF	Romania	Mihai Maxin (to Luceafărul Oradea)
—	MF	Romania	Alexandru Neacșa (to Viitorul Șelimbăr)
—	MF	Romania	Remus Sandu (to Free agent)
—	MF	Romania	Vlad Tudorache (to Ripensia Timișoara)
—	FW	Romania	Cosmin Ionică (to Metaloglobus București)
—	FW	Romania	Daniel Lăsconi (to Luceafărul Oradea, previously on loan)
