= 2021 Cupa României final =

- Event: 2020–21 Cupa României
Astra Giurgiu	Universitatea Craiova
2	3
- Date: 22 May 2021
- Venue: Ilie Oană, Ploiești
- Man of the Match: Valentin Gheorghe
- Referee: Horațiu Feșnic
- Attendance: 1500 (Note: The match was played with a limited capacity of fans in attendance due to the COVID-19 pandemic in Romania.)
- Weather: Clear

The 2021 Cupa României final was the final match of the 2020–21 Cupa României and the 83rd final of the Cupa României, Romania's premier football cup competition. It was played on 22 May 2021 between Astra Giurgiu and Universitatea Craiova and was the first major sports event in Romania to be played with fans in attendance during the COVID-19 pandemic, though to a limited capacity.

The game took place on Ilie Oană in Ploiești, Universitatea Craiova claiming its eight cup after a 3–2 victory in extra time.

== Route to the final ==
Astra Giurgiu		Round	Universitatea Craiova
Opponent	Results		Opponent	Results
Ripensia Timișoara	5–1 (A)	Last 32	Progresul Spartac București	5–0 (A)
Politehnica Timișoara	2–1 (H)	Last 16	Botoșani	1-0 (A)
Petrolul Ploiești	3–0 (A)	Quarter-finals	Chindia Târgoviște	1–0 (A)
Dinamo București	1–0 (H) and 0-1 (A) (a.e.t.) (5-4 p)	Semi-finals	Viitorul Târgu Jiu	3–0 (H) and 2–2 (A)

== Match ==
22 May 2021
20:30 EEST (UTC+3)

Astra Giurgiu (1)	2–3 (a.e.t.)	Universitatea Craiova (1)
Găman 17' (pen.); Boé-Kane 93'	Report 1 Report 2	Ivan 14'; Nistor 100'; Screciu 113'

Ilie Oană, Ploiești
Attendance: 1.500
Referee: Horațiu Feșnic

Astra Giurgiu	Universitatea Craiova

GK	12	(Romania) Mihai Popa	(yellow card) 107'
RB	2	(Portugal) Hugo Sousa		(substituted off) 66'
CB	25	(Romania) Valerică Găman (c)
CB	27	(Croatia) Igor Jovanović
LB	3	(Cameroon) Abdel Lamanje	(yellow card) 52'
CM	21	(Croatia) Ljuban Crepulja	(yellow card) 90+2'
CM	91	(France) Yann Boé-Kane
CM	7	(Croatia) Dario Čanađija		(substituted off) 118'
RW	77	(Romania) Albert Stahl		(substituted off) 67'
CF	9	(Bosnia and Herzegovina) Sulejman Krpić
LW	11	(Romania) Valentin Gheorghe		(substituted off) 118'
Substitutes:
GK	23	(Romania) Mirel Bolboașă
CB	23	(Romania) Cătălin Ion
LB	92	(Romania) Robert Riza		(substituted in) 66'
AM	96	(Romania) Silviu Balaure		(substituted in) 67'
CM	6	(Romania) Paulian Banu
CM	24	(Romania) Alexandru Duminica
AM	99	(Romania) Dragoș Gheorghe		(substituted in) 118'
AM	9	(Romania) Gabriel Șerban
CF	43	(Nigeria) Abdul Fatai Adeshina		(substituted in) 118'
Manager:
(Romania) Ionuț Badea

GK	13	(Italy) Mirko Pigliacelli	(yellow card) 115'
LB	99	(Romania) Nicușor Bancu (c)
CB	23	(Romania) Marius Constantin		(substituted off) 74'
CB	4	(Romania) Mihai Bălașa
RB	5	(Romania) Bogdan Vătăjelu
LCM	28	(Romania) George Cîmpanu		(substituted off) 66'
CM	8	(Romania) Alexandru Mateiu		(substituted off) 75'
CM	10	(Romania) Alexandru Cicâldău
CM	16	(Romania) Dan Nistor
RCM	17	(Romania) Ștefan Baiaram		(substituted off) 74'
CF	9	(Romania) Andrei Ivan
Substitutes:
GK	1	(Romania) Laurențiu Popescu
CB	25	(Ivory Coast) Stephane Acka		(substituted in) 74'
CB	6	(Romania) Vladimir Screciu		(substituted in) 74'
RW	24	(Spain) Juan Camara		(substituted in) 66'	(substituted off) 109'
CM	29	(Romania) Ovidiu Bic
CM	27	(Romania) Vasile Constantin
CM	21	(Switzerland) Matteo Fedele		(substituted in) 109'
CM	33	(Romania) Mihai Căpățînă
CF	20	(Romania) Alexandru Tudorie		(substituted in) 75'
Manager:
(Greece) Marinos Ouzounidis

MAN OF THE MATCH

- (Romania) Valentin Gheorghe

MATCH OFFICIALS

- Assistant referees:
  - Octavian Șovre
  - Alexandru Cerei
- Fourth official:
  - Florin Marcu
- Additional assistant referees:

MATCH RULES

- 90 minutes.
- 30 minutes of extra-time if necessary.
- Penalty shoot-out if scores still level.
- Nine named substitutes.
- Maximum of five substitutions, with a sixth allowed in extra time.
