= Stadionul Parc =

Stadionul Parc may refer to:

- Stadionul Parc (Breaza)
- Stadionul Parc (Caracal)
