= Ionuț Trocan =

Romanian footballer

Personal information
- Full name: Ionuț Angelotti Trocan
- Date of birth: 7 October 1995 (age 31)
- Place of birth: Craiova, Romania
- Position: Defender

Youth career
- Pandurii Târgu Jiu

Senior career*
Years	Team	Apps	(Gls)
2014–2015	Pandurii II Târgu Jiu		
2015–2017	Pandurii Târgu Jiu	2	(0)
2017–2018	Universitatea II Craiova	37	(1)
- * Club domestic league appearances and goals as of 2 September 2018

Ionuț Angelotti Trocan (born 7 October 1995) is a Romanian professional footballer who plays as a defender for Universitatea II Craiova.
