= CS Universitatea II Craiova =

Reserve team of CS Universitatea Craiova

Universitatea II Craiova
- Full name: U Craiova 1948 Club Sportiv II
- Nickname: Satelitul (The Satellite)
- Short name: U II Craiova, Univ II Craiova
- Founded: 2014
- Ground: Parc Stadium (Caracal)
- Capacity: 11,500
- Owner: Mihai Rotaru
- Manager: Pedro Lomba
- League: Liga III
- Website: http://www.ucv1948.ro/
Home colours	Away colours	Third colours

U Craiova 1948 Club Sportiv II, commonly known as Universitatea II Craiova (Romanian pronunciation: [universiˈtate̯a kraˈjova]), U II Craiova is the reserve squad of Romanian first league side, CS Universitatea Craiova

== History ==
The team was founded in the summer of 2014 from the desire of having a second senior squad where the players who finished the youth academy could be accommodated with the level of seniors, in the idea of being subsequently promoted to the first squad. The team was enrolled in the Liga IV – Dolj County where it was crowned as champion after just one season, winning the league, then the playoff tournament. The team qualified for the Liga III promotion play-off where they won without any problems, 12–0 on aggregate against Pandurii Cerneți, Mehedinți County champions.

After promotion, the satellite was managed by former Craiova players as Bogdan Vrăjitoarea, Corneliu Papură or Dragoș Bon and obtained following rankings: 2015–16 – 12th of 15, 2016–17 – 11th of 15 and 2017–18 – 5th of 15.

== Grounds ==
=== Complexul Sportiv Ion Oblemenco ===
In the first season of its existence Universitatea II Craiova played all the home matches on the second ground from the Ion Oblemenco Sports Complex, near Ion Oblemeco Stadium.

=== Stadionul Oltenia ===
The promotion to Liga III was corroborated with the demolition of the stadium, fact that determined the move of the first squad from Ion Oblemenco Stadium to Extensiv Stadium and the move of the second team from Ion Oblemenco Sports Complex to Oltenia Stadium in Ișalnița, with a capacity of 2,000 seats.

=== Stadionul Extensiv ===
In 2016 CS Universitatea Craiova moved its official home matches to Municipal Stadium in Drobeta-Turnu Severin, action that caused the move of the satellite from Ișalnița back to Craiova, this time on Extensiv Stadium with a capacity of 7,000 seats.

On 10 November 2017 the reconstructed Ion Oblemenco Stadium was inaugurated with a friendly match between CS Universitatea Craiova and SK Slavia Prague. After this event, the first squad moved back to Ion Oblemenco Stadium and the second team remained for its official matches on Extensiv Stadium.

=== Aripile ===
FRF decided that Universitatea II Craiova stop playing at Extensiv with a capacity of 7,000 and they decided to play home games at Stadionul Aripile with capacity of 3.000

=== Parc Stadium ===
The team previously played its home matches at Stadionul Aripile in Craiova, but due to the stadium’s poor condition it relocated to Parc Stadium in Caracal. During the 2023–24 season, Universitatea Craiova II was dissolved, but was later reactivated and re-entered competition in Liga III from the following season.

== Honours ==
=== Leagues ===
Liga IV – Dolj County

- Winners (1): 2014–15

=== Cups ===
Cupa României – Dolj County

- Winners (1): 2014–15

== League history ==
Season	Tier	Division	Place	Notes	Cupa României
2025–26	3	Liga III (Seria V)	1th		
2023–24	3	Liga III (Seria VII)	5th	Dissolved	
2022–23	3	Liga III (Seria VI)	6th		
2021–22	3	Liga III (Seria VI)	7th		
2020–21	3	Liga III (Seria VI)	9th		
2019–20	3	Liga III (Seria III)	5th		

Season	Tier	Division	Place	Notes	Cupa României
2018–19	3	Liga III (Seria III)	7th		
2017–18	3	Liga III (Seria IV)	5th		
2016–17	3	Liga III (Seria III)	11th		
2015–16	3	Liga III (Seria IV)	12th		
2014–15	4	Liga IV (DJ)	1st (C)	Promoted	

== Notable former players ==
The footballers enlisted below have had international cap(s) for their respective countries at junior and/or senior level and/or played in a fully professional league.

- (Romania) Raoul Baicu
- (Romania) Florin Borța
- (Romania) Lucian Buzan
- (Moldova) Nicolae Calancea
- (Romania) Paul Hodea
- (Romania) Alin Manea
- (Romania) Jovan Marković
- (Romania) Simon Măzărache
- (Romania) Valentin Mihăilă
- (Romania) Robert Petre
- (Romania) Alexandru Popescu
- (Romania) Ionuț Trocan
- (Romania) Ștefan Vlădoiu

== Former managers ==
- (Romania) Corneliu Papură (2013)
- (Romania) Daniel Mogoșanu (2014–2015)
- (Romania) Bogdan Vrăjitoarea (2016)
- (Romania) Corneliu Papură (2016–2018)
- (Romania) Adrian Iencsi (2019–2020)
- (Romania) Ionuț Stancu (2020)
- (Romania) Mugur Gușatu (2021)
- (Romania) Corneliu Papură (2021–2023)
- (Romania) Dragoș Bon (2023)
- (Romania) Corneliu Papură (2023–2024)
- (Romania) Ștefan Florescu (2025–2026)
- (Portugal) Pedro Lomba (2026–)
