= Corneliu Papură =

Romanian footballer and manager

Personal information
- Date of birth: 5 September 1973 (age 53)
- Place of birth: Craiova, Romania
- Height: 1.85 m (6 ft 1 in)
- Positions: Centre-back; defensive midfielder

Youth career
- –1992: Universitatea Craiova

Senior career*
Years	Team	Apps	(Gls)
1992–1996	Universitatea Craiova	101	(4)
1996–1999	Rennes	26	(2)
1996–1999	Rennes B	22	(2)
1999–2000	Universitatea Craiova	53	(3)
2001	Național București	12	(1)
2001–2002	Beitar Jerusalem	25	(1)
2002–2004	Universitatea Craiova	60	(7)
2004	AEL Limassol	10	(1)
2005	Universitatea Craiova	12	(0)
2005	Changchun Yatai	12	(2)
2006	Guangzhou Pharmaceutical	19	(1)
2006–2007	Național București	13	(0)
Total		365	(24)

International career
1994–1996	Romania	12	(0)

Managerial career
- 2007: Progresul București
- 2010–2011: ALRO Slatina
- 2012: Olt Slatina
- 2013: Universitatea II Craiova
- 2013–2014: Universitatea Craiova (assistant)
- 2016–2018: Universitatea II Craiova
- 2018–2019: Universitatea Craiova (scout)
- 2019: Universitatea Craiova
- 2019: Universitatea Craiova (assistant)
- 2020: Universitatea Craiova
- 2020–2021: Universitatea Craiova
- 2021–2023: Universitatea II Craiova
- 2023: Universitatea Craiova (caretaker)
- 2023–2025: Universitatea II Craiova
- * Club domestic league appearances and goals

Corneliu Papură (born 5 September 1973) is a Romanian professional football manager and former player, who played as a centre-back or a defensive midfielder.

== Club career ==
Papură was born in Craiova, and started his career with his hometown team Universitatea Craiova, in 1992. As a player, he played for Universitatea in four different periods, spending a large part of his career with the club, with short stints in France, Israel and Cyprus.

== International career ==
Papură earned 12 caps for the Romania national team, and was in the squad for the 1994 World Cup.

== Career statistics ==
Romania
Year	Apps	Goals
1994	7	0
1995	2	0
1996	3	0
Total	12	0

== Honours ==
=== Player ===
Universitatea Craiova

- Cupa României: 1992–93
