= Robert Neciu =

Romanian footballer

Personal information
- Full name: Robert Sorin Neciu
- Date of birth: 10 January 1999 (age 27)
- Place of birth: Roșiorii de Vede, Romania
- Height: 1.73 m (5 ft 8 in)
- Position: Defender

Youth career
- Atletico Roșiori
- –2018: Gheorghe Hagi Academy

Senior career*
Years	Team	Apps	(Gls)
2018–2021	Viitorul Constanța	0	(0)
2019	→ Farul Constanța (loan)	15	(0)
2019	→ Chindia Târgoviște (loan)	13	(0)
2020–2021	→ Universitatea Cluj (loan)	14	(0)
2021–2022	Botoșani	3	(0)

International career^{‡}
2015	Romania U15	2	(0)
2014–2015	Romania U16	3	(0)
2015	Romania U17	3	(0)
2017–2018	Romania U19	8	(0)
- * Club domestic league appearances and goals as of 23 September 2022 ‡ National team caps and goals as of 20 November 2020

Robert Sorin Neciu (born 10 January 1999) is a Romanian professional footballer who plays as a defender.
