= Gabriel Dodoi =

Romanian footballer

Personal information
- Full name: Gabriel Ionuț Dodoi
- Date of birth: 27 September 1998 (age 28)
- Place of birth: Târgu Jiu, Romania
- Height: 1.86 m (6 ft 1 in)
- Position: Forward

Youth career
- –2016: Pandurii Târgu Jiu

Senior career*
Years	Team	Apps	(Gls)
2016–2017	Pandurii Târgu Jiu	24	(7)
2018–2019	CFR Cluj	0	(0)
2018	→ Sepsi OSK (loan)	1	(0)
2019	→ Pandurii Târgu Jiu (loan)	10	(5)
2019–2020	Rapid București	6	(0)
2020	→ CSM Reșița (loan)	1	(0)
2020–2021	Pandurii Târgu Jiu	20	(9)
2021–2023	Viitorul Târgu Jiu	46	(9)
2023	Chindia Târgoviște	2	(0)
2023–2024	CSM Alexandria	14	(0)
2024–2025	CSM Focșani	15	(1)
2025	SCM Râmnicu Vâlcea	0	(0)
- * Club domestic league appearances and goals as of 14 December 2024

Gabriel Ionuț Dodoi (born 27 September 1998) is a Romanian professional footballer who plays as a forward.
