= Ionuț Ursu =

Romanian footballer

Personal information
- Full name: Ionuț Andrei Ursu
- Date of birth: 21 March 1989 (age 37)
- Place of birth: Bacău, Romania
- Height: 1.87 m (6 ft 2 in)
- Position: Centre back

Team information
- Current team: FC Bacău
- Number: 29

Youth career
- FCM Bacău

Senior career*
Years	Team	Apps	(Gls)
2010–2012	FCM Bacău	55	(2)
2012–2014	Botoșani	22	(0)
2014	→ Dunărea Galați	14	(0)
2014	Săgeata Năvodari	7	(0)
2015–2016	SC Bacău	39	(1)
2016–2019	Sepsi OSK	60	(3)
2019	→ Universitatea Cluj (loan)	8	(0)
2019–2021	Farul Constanța	28	(1)
2021	Unirea Constanța	3	(0)
2021–2022	Ceahlăul Piatra Neamț	31	(2)
2023–2024	CSM Bacău	34	(2)
2024–	FC Bacău	0	(0)
- * Club domestic league appearances and goals as of 09:25, 22 November 2024 (UTC)

Ionuț Andrei Ursu (born 21 March 1989) is a Romanian footballer who plays as a centre back for FC Bacău.

== Club career ==
He made his debut on the professional league level in the Liga I for Botoșani on 21 July 2013 as a starter in a game against CFR Cluj.

== Honours ==
FCM Bacău

- Liga III: 2010–11

FC Botoșani

- Liga II: 2012–13
