= Alexandru Costache =

Romanian professional footballer

Personal information
- Full name: Alexandru Silviu Costache
- Date of birth: 10 October 1999 (age 27)
- Place of birth: Bucharest, Romania
- Height: 1.93 m (6 ft 4 in)
- Position: Goalkeeper

Team information
- Current team: Dunărea Călărași
- Number: 12

Youth career
- "Mircea Eliade" București
- –2017: Concordia Chiajna

Senior career*
Years	Team	Apps	(Gls)
2018–2022	Concordia Chiajna	10	(0)
2019	→ Pandurii Târgu Jiu (loan)	10	(0)
2021	→ Unirea Constanța (loan)	0	(0)
2021–2022	→ Dunărea Călărași (loan)	16	(0)
2022–2023	Minaur Baia Mare	8	(0)
2023–	Dunărea Călărași	31	(0)

International career^{‡}
2015–2016	Romania U18	2	(0)
2016–2018	Romania U19	3	(0)
- * Club domestic league appearances and goals as of 17:09, 6 December 2024 (UTC) ‡ National team caps and goals as of 27 March 2018

Alexandru Silviu Costache (born 10 October 1999) is a Romanian professional footballer who plays as a goalkeeper for Dunărea Călărași.
