= Cătălin Ion =

Romanian footballer

Personal information
- Full name: Cătălin Andrei Ion
- Date of birth: 13 November 1998 (age 27)
- Place of birth: Caracal, Romania
- Height: 1.87 m (6 ft 2 in)
- Position: Defender

Youth career
- 2015–2019: Universitatea Craiova

Senior career*
Years	Team	Apps	(Gls)
2019–2021	Universitatea Craiova	0	(0)
2019–2020	→ Tractorul Cetate (loan)	4	(0)
2020–2021	→ Vedița Colonești (loan)	10	(0)
2021	Astra Giurgiu	1	(0)
2021	CSM Reșița	9	(0)
2022	Academica Clinceni	16	(0)
2022	SCM Zalău	5	(0)
- * Club domestic league appearances and goals as of 11:33, 20 December 2022 (UTC)

Cătălin Andrei Ion (born 13 November 1998) is a Romanian professional footballer who plays as a defender.
