= Mickaël Diakota =

French footballer (born 1990)

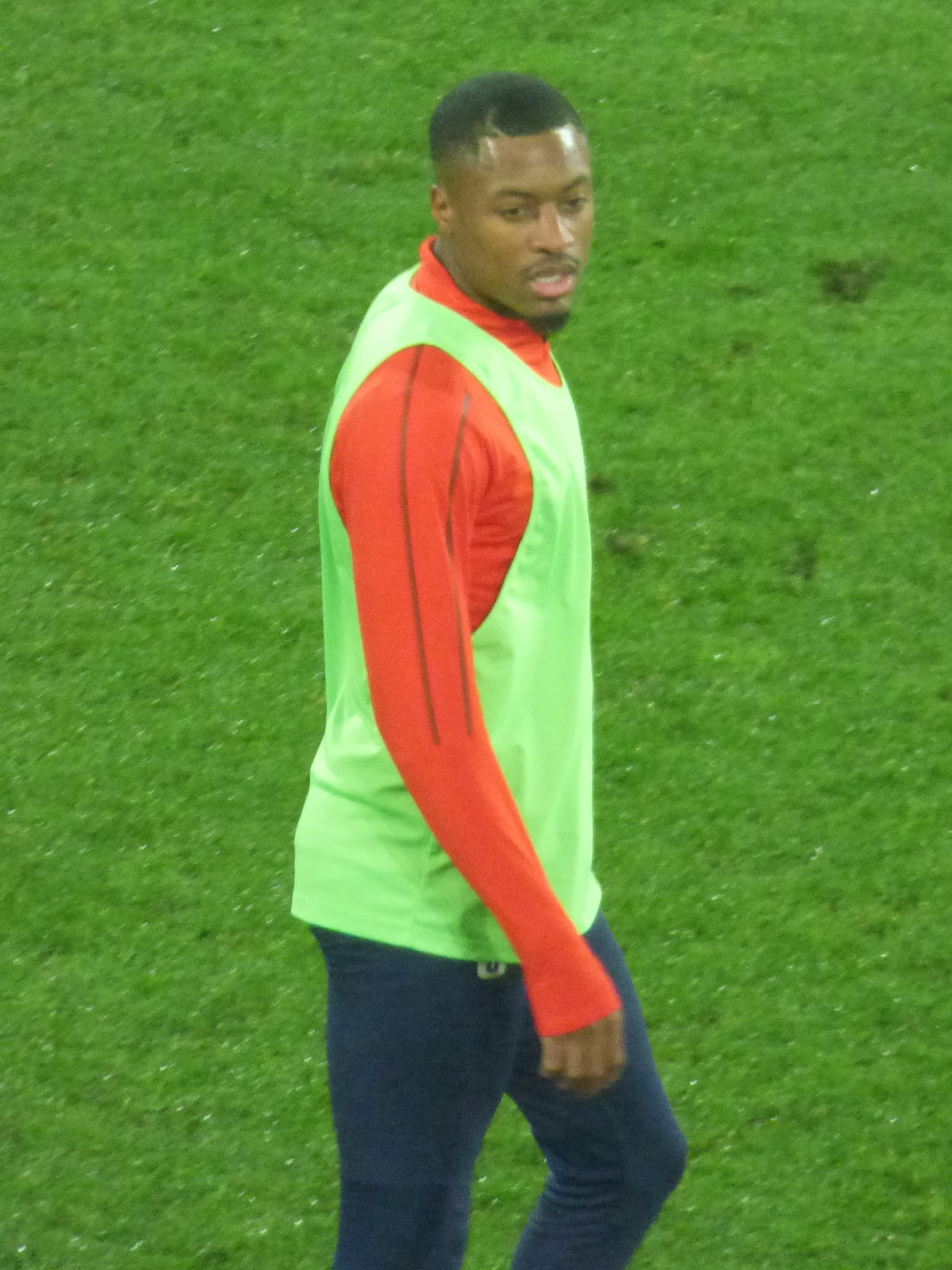
- Diakota in 2019

Personal information
- Date of birth: 6 October 1990 (age 36)
- Place of birth: Paris, France
- Height: 1.80 m (5 ft 11 in)
- Position: Midfielder

Youth career
- 2003–2004: FC Massy 91
- 2004–2005: Antony Sports
- 2005–2007: Centre de Formation F. Paris
- 2007–2010: Nancy

Senior career*
Years	Team	Apps	(Gls)
2008–2010	Nancy II	30	(1)
2010–2011	Noisy-le-Sec	30	(0)
2011–2014	Luzenac	53	(4)
2014–2016	Colmar	24	(1)
2016–2017	Raon-l'Étape	12	(0)
2017–2019	Béziers	40	(1)
2019–2020	Gaz Metan Mediaș	15	(0)
2021–2022	Le Touquet	4	(0)

International career
2009	France U20	1	(0)
- * Club domestic league appearances and goals as of 1 July 2022

Mickaël Diakota (born 6 October 1990) is a French professional footballer who most recently played for Gaz Metan Mediaș as a midfielder.

== Club career ==
Diakota was a member of the AS Nancy youth academy since 2007, and begun his career in the lower divisions of France. He helped Luzenac AP win promotion into the Ligue 2 in 2014, but the authorities denied their promotion. He went to SR Colmar in 2015, but tore his achilles tendon leaving him out of action for seven months.

Diakota joined AS Béziers in 2017 and helped them get promoted into the Ligue 2. He made his professional debut in a 2–0 Ligue 2 win over his childhood club AS Nancy.

On 6 July 2019, Diakota signed a two-year contract with Liga I club Gaz Metan Mediaș.

== International career ==
Diakota made one appearance for the France U20s in a 1–1 friendly tie with the Senegal U20s on 28 September 2009.

== Career statistics ==
As of match played 3 May 2019

Appearances and goals by club, season and competition
Club	Season	League			Cup (Note: Includes Coupe de France and Coupe de la Ligue.)		Other		Total	
Club	Season	Division	Apps	Goals	Apps	Goals	Apps	Goals	Apps	Goals
Noisy-le-Sec	2010–11	CFA	30	0	0	0	—		30	0
Luzenac	2011–12	Championnat National	7	0	0	0	—		7	0
Luzenac	2012–13	Championnat National	29	3	0	0	—		29	3
Luzenac	2013–14	Championnat National	17	1	0	0	—		17	1
Luzenac	Total		53	4	0	0	0	0	53	4
Colmar	2014–15	Championnat National	17	1	0	0	—		17	1
Colmar	2015–16	Championnat National	7	0	0	0	—		7	0
Colmar	Total		24	1	0	0	0	0	24	1
Raon-l'Étape	2016–17	CFA	12	0	0	0	—		12	0
Béziers	2017–18	Championnat National	22	1	0	0	—		22	1
Béziers	2018–19	Ligue 2	17	0	2	0	—		19	0
Béziers	Total		39	1	2	0	0	0	41	1
Career total			158	6	2	0	0	0	160	6
