= Salvatore Marrone =

Romanian professional footballer

Personal information
- Full name: Salvatore Gioacchino Marrone
- Date of birth: 5 May 2001 (age 25)
- Place of birth: Pforzheim, Germany
- Height: 1.85 m (6 ft 1 in)
- Position: Defender

Team information
- Current team: 1. CfR Pforzheim
- Number: 27

Youth career
- SV Schwarzenberg
- –2011: Karlsruher SC
- 2011–2014: VfB Stuttgart
- 2014–2016: Sandhausen
- 2017–2018: Nürnberg
- 2018–2019: FCSB

Senior career*
Years	Team	Apps	(Gls)
2019–2020	FCSB	0	(0)
2019	→ Academica Clinceni (loan)	3	(1)
2019	→ Dunărea Călărași (loan)	15	(2)
2020–2024	FK Csíkszereda	25	(2)
2022	→ Voluntari (loan)	4	(0)
2023	→ UTA Arad (loan)	2	(0)
2024–2025	1599 Șelimbăr	10	(0)
2025	Termoli	1	(0)
2025v	United Riccione	13	(0)
2025–	1. CfR Pforzheim	11	(0)

International career
2017–2018	Romania U17	5	(0)
2018–2019	Romania U18	5	(0)
2019	Romania U19	3	(0)
- * Club domestic league appearances and goals as of 30 November 2025

Salvatore Gioacchino Marrone (born 5 May 2001), is a Romanian professional footballer who plays as a defender for Oberliga Baden-Württemberg club 1. CfR Pforzheim.

== Club career ==
Marrone grew up in Germany, in the football academies of VfB Stuttgart, SV Sandhausen and 1. FC Nürnberg, before moving to Romania, where he played for teams such as Academica Clinceni, Dunărea Călărași or FK Csíkszereda, at the level of Liga II.
