= Denis Brînzan =

Romanian footballer

Personal information
- Full name: Denis Gigi Brînzan
- Date of birth: 26 November 1996 (age 29)
- Place of birth: Târgu Jiu, Romania
- Height: 1.81 m (5 ft 11 in)
- Position: Midfielder

Youth career
- –2016: Pandurii Târgu Jiu

Senior career*
Years	Team	Apps	(Gls)
2016–2019	Pandurii Târgu Jiu	63	(3)
2019–2020	Argeș Pitești	18	(0)
2020–2021	CSM Reșița	8	(0)
2021–2024	Viitorul Târgu Jiu	50	(6)
2024–2025	CSM Focșani	15	(2)
2025	SCM Râmnicu Vâlcea	0	(0)
- * Club domestic league appearances and goals as of 14 December 2024

Denis Gigi Brînzan (born 26 November 1996) is a Romanian professional footballer who plays as a midfielder.
