= Teodor Axinte =

Romanian professional footballer

Personal information
- Date of birth: 2 February 2000 (age 26)
- Place of birth: Iași, Romania
- Height: 1.88 m (6 ft 2 in)
- Position: Goalkeeper

Youth career
- Noua Generație Iași
- –2016: Politehnica Iași

Senior career*
Years	Team	Apps	(Gls)
2017–2022	Politehnica Iași	17	(0)
2018	→ Pașcani (loan)	10	(0)
2018	→ Lugoj (loan)	10	(0)
2019	→ Viitorul Târgu Jiu (loan)	13	(0)
2019	→ Aerostar Bacău (loan)	10	(0)
2022	Dante Botoșani	0	(0)

International career^{‡}
2016	Romania U-17	0	(0)
2020–	Romania U-21	0	(0)
- * Club domestic league appearances and goals as of 12:04, 20 December 2022 (UTC) ‡ National team caps and goals as of 14 October 2020

Teodor Axinte (born 2 February 2000) is a Romanian former professional footballer who played as a goalkeeper.

== Post-football career ==
In 2023, at the age of 23, Axinte retired from professional football due to recurring injuries and a desire to focus on his family. Following his retirement, he transitioned into the information technology (IT) industry, working as a frontend developer.
