= Cristian Raiciu =

Romanian footballer

Personal information
- Full name: Cristian Ștefan Raiciu
- Date of birth: 3 July 1996 (age 30)
- Place of birth: Bucharest, Romania
- Height: 1.81 m (5 ft 11 in)
- Position: Midfielder

Youth career
- Concordia Chiajna

Senior career*
Years	Team	Apps	(Gls)
2012–2013	Concordia II Chiajna		
2013–2015	Concordia Chiajna	3	(0)
2015–2016	Rapid București	19	(0)
2016–2017	FCSB II	25	(1)
2017–2019	Pandurii Târgu Jiu	56	(1)
2019–2020	Dunărea Călărași	4	(0)
- * Club domestic league appearances and goals as of 30 June 2020

Cristian Ștefan Raiciu (born 3 July 1996) is a Romanian professional footballer who plays as a midfielder. Raiciu started his career at Concordia Chiajna, team for which he also made the Liga I debut and played subsequently for Rapid București and Steaua II București.
