= Alexandru Gîț =

Romanian footballer (born 1997)

Personal information
- Full name: Alexandru Daniel Gîț
- Date of birth: 9 October 1997 (age 29)
- Place of birth: Timișoara, Romania
- Height: 1.80 m (5 ft 11 in)
- Position: Right-back

Team information
- Current team: Voluntari
- Number: 20

Youth career
- –2015: LPS Banatul Timișoara

Senior career*
Years	Team	Apps	(Gls)
2015–2016	Sănătatea Cluj		
2016	Performanța Ighiu		
2017	Unirea Jucu		
2017–2018	Universitatea II Cluj		
2018	Dacia Unirea Brăila	12	(0)
2018–2019	Sportul Snagov	26	(0)
2019–2020	Gloria Buzău	16	(0)
2020–2021	FC U Craiova	16	(0)
2021	Universitatea Cluj	13	(0)
2022–2023	Unirea Dej	32	(1)
2023–2024	Chindia Târgoviște	10	(0)
2024	1599 Șelimbăr	14	(2)
2024–	Voluntari	51	(2)
- * Club domestic league appearances and goals as of 23 September 2026

Alexandru Daniel Gîț (born 9 October 1997) is a Romanian professional footballer who plays as a right-back for Liga I club Voluntari.

== Honours ==
FC U Craiova

- Liga II: 2020–21
