= Vlad Danale =

Romanian professional footballer

Personal information
- Full name: Vlad Andrei Danale
- Date of birth: 28 January 1998 (age 28)
- Place of birth: Iași, Romania
- Height: 1.73 m (5 ft 8 in)
- Position: Forward

Team information
- Current team: Alexandria
- Number: 17

Youth career
- –2016: Politehnica Iași

Senior career*
Years	Team	Apps	(Gls)
2016–2020	Politehnica Iași	16	(1)
2019	→ Sportul Snagov (loan)	8	(2)
2019–2020	→ Aerostar Bacău (loan)	13	(2)
2020–2021	Aerostar Bacău	27	(3)
2022	Hușana Huși	12	(0)
2022–2023	Dante Botoșani	11	(2)
2023–2024	Știința Miroslava	34	(12)
2024–	Alexandria	0	(0)
- * Club domestic league appearances and goals as of 14:08, 12 November 2024 (UTC)

Vlad Andrei Danale (born 28 January 1998) is a Romanian professional footballer who plays as a forward for CSM Alexandria.

== Honours ==
Aerostar Bacău

- Liga III: 2019–20
