= Liviu Gheorghe =

Romanian footballer

Personal information
- Full name: Liviu Cosmin Gheorghe
- Date of birth: 2 August 1999 (age 27)
- Place of birth: Brăila, Romania
- Height: 1.70 m (5 ft 7 in)
- Position: Midfielder

Team information
- Current team: ACS FC Dinamo
- Number: 31

Youth career
- Luceafărul Brăila
- Dinamo București

Senior career*
Years	Team	Apps	(Gls)
2017–2022	Dinamo București	5	(0)
2018	→ Dacia Unirea Brăila (loan)	7	(1)
2019	→ Sportul Snagov (loan)	5	(2)
2019	→ Daco-Getica București (loan)	7	(0)
2020	→ Înainte Modelu (loan)		
2020–2021	→ Axiopolis Cernavodă (loan)	16	(9)
2021–2022	→ Înainte Modelu (loan)	15	(2)
2022–2024	Înainte Modelu	56	(10)
2024–	ACS FC Dinamo	5	(0)

International career^{‡}
2015–2016	Romania U-16	3	(0)
2017–2018	Romania U-19	4	(0)
- * Club domestic league appearances and goals as of 14:08, 27 December 2024 (UTC) ‡ National team caps and goals as of 10 November 2017

Liviu Cosmin Gheorghe (born 2 August 1999) is a Romanian professional footballer who plays as a midfielder for ACS FC Dinamo.
