= Paul Pațurcă =

Romanian footballer

Personal information
- Full name: Paul Ioan Pațurcă
- Date of birth: 20 March 1996 (age 30)
- Place of birth: Bucharest, Romania
- Height: 1.78 m (5 ft 10 in)
- Position: Midfielder

Youth career
- –2012: Sportul Studențesc

Senior career*
Years	Team	Apps	(Gls)
2012–2013	Sportul Studențesc	4	(0)
2013–2014	Juniorul București		
2014–2019	Viitorul Domnești		
2018–2019	→ Academica Clinceni (loan)	32	(4)
2019	Academica Clinceni	3	(0)
2019–2020	Turris Turnu Măgurele	11	(1)
2020–2021	Buzău	15	(0)
2021	Gaz Metan Mediaș	0	(0)
2021–2022	Buzău	18	(5)
2022–2023	Concordia Chiajna	17	(1)
2023–2024	Gloria Bistrița	14	(1)
- * Club domestic league appearances and goals

Paul Ioan Pațurcă (born 20 March 1996) is a Romanian professional footballer who plays as a midfielder.
