= Robert Petre (footballer) =

Romanian footballer

Personal information
- Full name: Robert Constantin Petre
- Date of birth: 27 April 1997 (age 29)
- Place of birth: Bulzești, Romania
- Height: 1.78 m (5 ft 10 in)
- Position: Winger

Team information
- Current team: Sporting Roșiori
- Number: 18

Youth career
- 2007–2014: CSJ Știința Craiova
- 2014–2015: Universitatea Craiova

Senior career*
Years	Team	Apps	(Gls)
2015–2021	Universitatea II Craiova		
2016–2017	Universitatea Craiova	12	(0)
2018–2019	→ Energeticianul (loan)	26	(2)
2021–2022	Pandurii Târgu Jiu	22	(4)
2022–2023	CSM Reșița	21	(4)
2023–2024	Filiași	24	(4)
2024–	Sporting Roșiori	10	(3)
- * Club domestic league appearances and goals as of 12:19, 23 December 2024 (UTC)

Robert Constantin Petre (born 27 April 1997) is a Romanian professional footballer who plays as a midfielder for Sporting Roșiori.

== Honours ==
CSM Reșița

- Liga III: 2022–23
