= Parc Stadium (Caracal) =

Multi-use stadium in Caracal, Romania

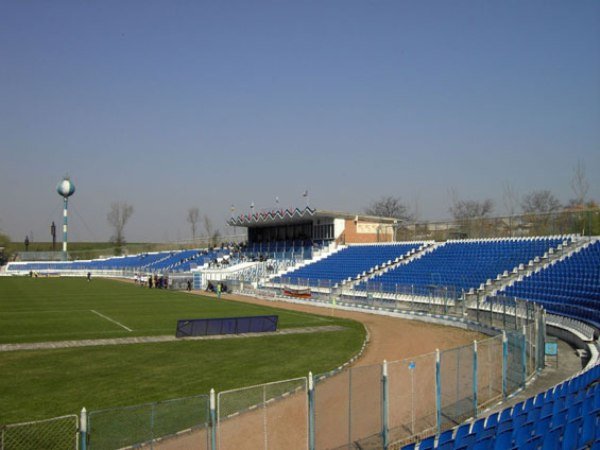
- Interactive map of Parc Stadium
- Location: Caracal, Romania
- Coordinates: 44.1172°N 24.3322°E
- Owner: Caracal Municipality
- Capacity: 11,500
- Surface: grass

Construction
- Renovated: 2006

Tenants
- Progresul Caracal (1924–2004); FC Caracal (2004–2013) CS Universitatea II Craiova (2025-)

The Parc Stadium is a multi-use stadium in Caracal, Olt county, Romania. It is currently used mostly for football matches, and is the home ground of FC Caracal. The stadium holds 11,500 people.

== Gallery ==
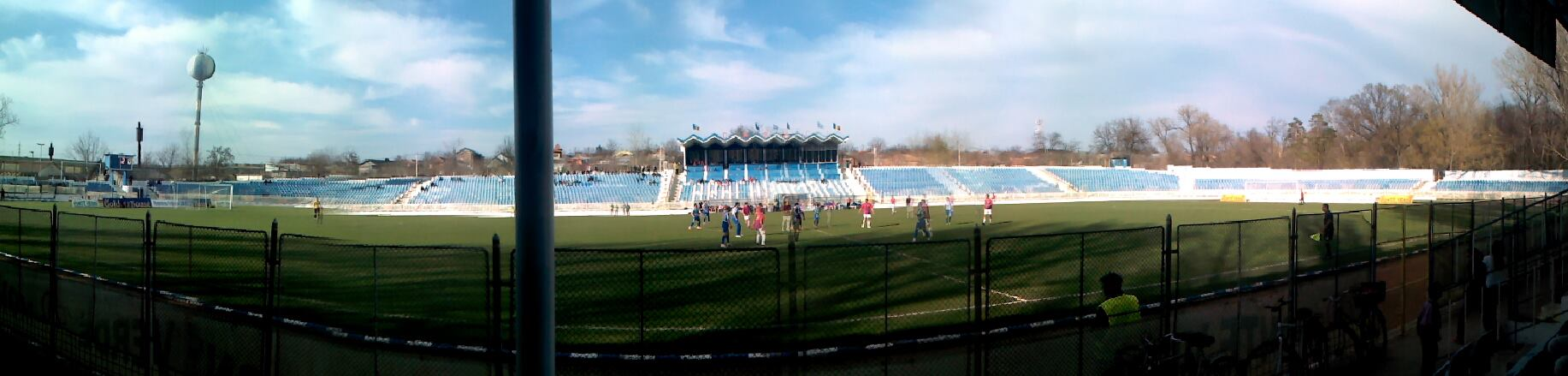
Stadium panorama.

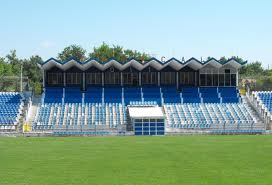
Main stand.
