= Ianoș Brînză =

Moldovan footballer

Personal information
- Date of birth: 12 September 1998 (age 28)
- Place of birth: Chișinău, Moldova
- Height: 1.91 m (6 ft 3 in)
- Position: Goalkeeper

Team information
- Current team: ACS FC Dinamo
- Number: 12

Youth career
- –2015: CSCT Buiucani

Senior career*
Years	Team	Apps	(Gls)
2015–2017	Dacia Chișinău	0	(0)
2015–2016	→ Dacia-2 Buiucani (loan)		
2016–2017	→ Politehnica Iași (loan)	0	(0)
2017–2022	Botoșani	3	(0)
2019	→ Petrolul Ploiești (loan)	2	(0)
2020–2021	→ Politehnica Iași (loan)	10	(0)
2021–2023	Politehnica Iași	19	(0)
2023	Alexandria	0	(0)
2024	Știința Miroslava	6	(0)
2024–2026	ACS FC Dinamo	14	(0)
2026-	ACS Agricola Borcea	0	(0)

International career
2018–2019	Moldova U21	2	(0)
- * Club domestic league appearances and goals as of 14:08, 27 December 2024 (UTC)

Ianoș Brînză (born 12 September 1998) is a Moldovan professional footballer who plays as a goalkeeper for Liga III club ACS FC Dinamo București. Brînză started his career at Dacia Chișinău, then played for Politehnica Iași, before signing for FC Botoșani in the summer of 2017.

== Honours ==
Politehnica Iași

- Liga II: 2022–23
