= Alexandru Ionuț Popescu =

Romanian footballer

Alexandru Popescu
Personal information
- Full name: Alexandru Ionuț Popescu
- Date of birth: 6 January 1998 (age 28)
- Place of birth: Voineasa, Romania
- Height: 1.81 m (5 ft 11 in)
- Position: Forward

Youth career
- 2009–2015: Școala de Fotbal Gheorghe Popescu
- 2015–2017: Universitatea Craiova

Senior career*
Years	Team	Apps	(Gls)
2017–2021	Universitatea Craiova	2	(0)
2018	→ Academica Clinceni (loan)	16	(3)
2018–2019	→ Mioveni (loan)	21	(5)
2019	→ Energeticianul (loan)	11	(2)
2019–2020	→ Academica Clinceni (loan)	7	(0)
2020	→ ASU Politehnica Timișoara (loan)	3	(1)
2021	→ Aerostar Bacău (loan)	6	(1)
2021–2022	Dunărea Călărași	16	(1)
2022	Vedița Colonești	6	(0)
2022–2024	CSM Deva	37	(31)
2024–2025	AFC Câmpulung Muscel	16	(1)
2025	Minerul Lupeni	1	(1)
2025-	Universitatea II Craiova club-update = 1 January 2026		
- * Club domestic league appearances and goals

Alexandru Ionuț Popescu (born 6 January 1998) is a Romanian professional footballer who plays as a forward.

== Honours ==
CSM Deva

- Liga III: 2022–23
