= Robert Riza =

Romanian professional footballer

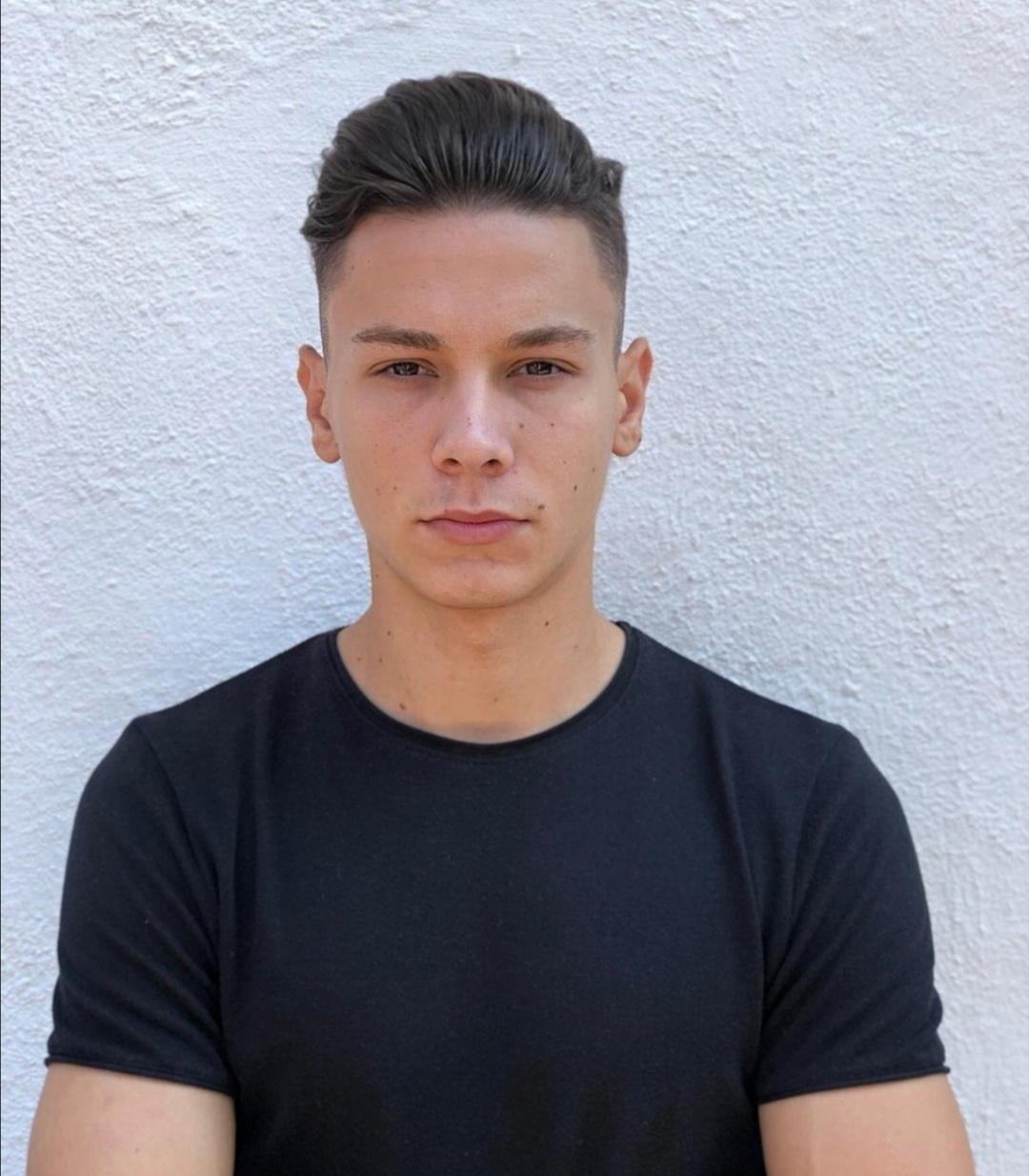

Personal information
- Date of birth: 9 June 1999 (age 27)
- Place of birth: Craiova, Romania
- Height: 1.83 m (6 ft 0 in)
- Position: Defender

Team information
- Current team: CSM Slatina
- Number: 20

Youth career
- Luceafărul Craiova
- –2018: Concordia Chiajna

Senior career*
Years	Team	Apps	(Gls)
2018–2020	Concordia Chiajna	2	(0)
2018–2019	→ Metaloglobus București (loan)	16	(0)
2020–2022	Astra Giurgiu	18	(2)
2022	Chindia Târgoviște	0	(0)
2022	1599 Șelimbăr	14	(0)
2023–2024	CSM Focșani	19	(1)
2024–2025	CSM Slatina	17	(1)
2025–2026	Academica Balș		
2026–	CSM Slatina	12	(1)
- * Club domestic league appearances and goals as of 1 November 2026

Robert Riza (born 9 June 1999) is a Romanian professional footballer who plays as a left-back for Liga II club CSM Slatina.

== Honours ==
Astra Giurgiu

- Cupa României runner-up: 2021–22
