= Lucian Buzan =

Romanian professional footballer

Personal information
- Date of birth: 9 March 1999 (age 27)
- Place of birth: Caransebeș, Romania
- Height: 1.70 m (5 ft 7 in)
- Position: Midfielder

Team information
- Current team: CSM Reșița
- Number: 99

Youth career
- 2010–2014: LPS Banatul Timișoara
- 2014–2018: Universitatea Craiova

Senior career*
Years	Team	Apps	(Gls)
2017–2019	Universitatea Craiova	1	(0)
2018	→ Dunărea Călărași (loan)	2	(0)
2019	→ ACS Poli Timișoara (loan)	16	(0)
2019–2021	Hermannstadt	28	(0)
2022–2023	1599 Șelimbăr	25	(3)
2023–2024	CSM Deva	14	(0)
2024–2026	1599 Șelimbăr	45	(1)
2026–	CSM Reșița	3	(0)
- * Club domestic league appearances and goals as of 1 November 2026

Lucian Buzan (born 9 March 1999) is a Romanian professional footballer who plays as a midfielder for Liga II club CSM Reșița.

== Honours ==
Universitatea Craiova

- Cupa României: 2017–18
