= Mirel Bolboașă =

Romanian footballer

Personal information
- Full name: Mirel Georgian Bolboașă
- Date of birth: 11 July 1989 (age 37)
- Place of birth: Pitești, Romania
- Height: 1.87 m (6 ft 2 in)
- Position: Goalkeeper

Team information
- Current team: Argeș Pitești (team manager)

Youth career
- –2007: Argeș Pitești

Senior career*
Years	Team	Apps	(Gls)
2007–2011	Argeș Pitești	21	(0)
2011–2016	Viitorul Constanța	21	(0)
2013–2014	→ FC Clinceni (loan)	32	(0)
2014–2015	→ Petrolul Ploiești (loan)	0	(0)
2015–2016	→ Universitatea Cluj (loan)	10	(0)
2017	ASA Târgu Mureș	1	(0)
2017–2019	Petrolul Ploiești	26	(0)
2019	UTA Arad	1	(0)
2020–2021	Astra Giurgiu	0	(0)
2021–2022	Hermannstadt	0	(0)
2022–2024	Clinceni	2	(0)
Total		113	(0)

Managerial career
- 2022–2023: Sport Team (GK coach)
- 2023–2024: LPS HD Clinceni (player/coach)
- 2024–2025: LPS HD Clinceni (sporting director)
- 2025–: Argeș Pitești (team manager)
- * Club domestic league appearances and goals

Mirel Georgian Bolboașă (born 11 June 1989) is a Romanian former professional footballer who played as a goalkeeper, currently team manager at Liga I club Argeș Pitești.

== Honours ==
Argeș Pitești

- Liga II: 2007–08

Petrolul Ploiești

- Liga III: 2017–18

Astra Giurgiu

- Cupa României runner-up: 2020–21
