= Paulian Banu =

Romanian footballer

Personal information
- Date of birth: 21 October 2000 (age 26)
- Place of birth: Ploiești, Romania
- Height: 1.80 m (5 ft 11 in)
- Position: Midfielder

Team information
- Current team: CSM Bacău
- Number: 8

Youth career
- 2009–2013: Petrolul 95 Ploiești
- 2013–2019: Astra Giurgiu

Senior career*
Years	Team	Apps	(Gls)
2016–2021	Astra II	46	(3)
2019–2022	Astra Giurgiu	23	(0)
2019–2020	→ Metaloglobus București (loan)	4	(0)
2022–2023	Viitorul Târgu Jiu	9	(0)
2023–2024	Metalul Buzău	19	(0)
2024–	CSM Bacău	0	(0)
- * Club domestic league appearances and goals as of 09:18, 22 November 2024 (UTC)

Paulian Banu (born October 21, 2000) is a Romanian professional footballer who plays as a midfielder for Liga III club CSM Bacău.

== Honours ==
Astra Giurgiu

- Supercupa României: 2016

Metalul Buzău

- Liga III: 2023–24
