= 2019 Cupa României final =

- Event: 2018–19 Cupa României
Astra Giurgiu	Viitorul Constanța
1	2
- Date: 25 May 2019
- Venue: Ilie Oană, Ploiești
- Man of the Match: Virgil Ghiță
- Referee: Radu Petrescu
- Attendance: 11,968
- Weather: Clear

The 2019 Cupa României final is the final match of the 2018–19 Cupa României and the 81st final of the Cupa României, Romania's premier football cup competition. It was played on 25 May 2019 between Astra Giurgiu and Viitorul Constanța.

Astra Giurgiu reached their third cup final in the club's existence. The club from Giurgiu won the cup in 2014 and lost the final in 2017, when the match was played on the same Ilie Oană Stadium, the home ground of Astra's bitter rival, Petrolul Ploiești. It should be mentioned that Astra was a football club originally from Ploiești until it was relocated in 2012 to Giurgiu.

On the other hand, this was the first Romanian Cup final for Viitorul. The champions of Romania in 2017, Hagi's Kids were in front of the second big achievement in the 10 years history of the club located on the seaside of the Black Sea.

The winner qualified for the 2019–20 UEFA Europa League. They also earned the right to play against 2018–19 Liga I champions for the 2019 Supercupa României.

Viitorul Constanța won the game dramatically by scoring in the extra-time.

The game was hosted by the Ilie Oană Stadium in Ploiești.

== Route to the final ==
Astra Giurgiu		Round	Viitorul Constanța
Opponent	Results		Opponent	Results
Luceafărul Oradea	5–1 (A)	Last 32	Concordia Chiajna	3–0 (A)
Universitatea Cluj	4–3 (a.e.t.) (A)	Last 16	Politehnica Iași	2–2 (a.e.t.) (5-3 p) (A)
Dunărea Călărași	2–1 (A)	Quarter-finals	Hermannstadt	3–2 (A)
CFR Cluj	3–1 (A) and 2–2 (H)	Semi-finals	Universitatea Craiova	2–1 (A) and 2–0 (H)

== Match ==
25 May 2019
20:00 EEST (UTC+3)

Astra Giurgiu (1)	1–2 (a.e.t.)	Viitorul Constanța (1)
Denis Alibec 41'		Virgil Ghiță 76'; Eric 105+2'

Ilie Oană, Ploiești
Attendance: 11,968
Referee: Radu Petrescu (Bucharest)

Astra Giurgiu	Viitorul Constanța

GK	1	(Romania) David Lazar
RB	19	(Romania) Mihai Butean
CB	25	(Democratic Republic of the Congo) Mike Cestor
CB	6	(Romania) Florin Bejan		(substituted off) 106'
LB	3	(Montenegro) Risto Radunović
DM	24	(Croatia) Filip Mrzljak (c)	(yellow card) 31'
DM	52	(Brazil) Romário Pires	(yellow card) 44' (yellow-red card) 81'
RM	95	(Romania) Romario Moise
AM	10	(Albania) Azdren Llullaku	(yellow card) 68'	(substituted off) 86'
LM	11	(Romania) Valentin Gheorghe		(substituted off) 68'
FW	7	(Romania) Denis Alibec	41'	(substituted off) 72'
Substitutes:
MF	8	(Romania) Ciprian Biceanu
MF	13	(Romania) Neluț Roșu
GK	18	(Portugal) Miguel Santos
DF	21	(Brazil) Erico	(yellow card) 108'	(substituted on) 86'
FW	88	(France) Julien Bègue		(substituted on) 68'
FW	90	(Finland) Vahid Hambo		(substituted on) 106'
MF	96	(Romania) Silviu Balaure		(substituted on) 72'
Manager:
(Romania) Costel Enache

GK	12	(Romania) Valentin Cojocaru		(substituted off) 46'
RB	5	(Romania) Sebastian Mladen	(yellow card) 99'
CB	15	(Romania) Bogdan Țîru
CB	2	(Romania) Virgil Ghiță		76'
LB	6	(Netherlands) Bradley de Nooijer
CM	96	(France) Lyes Houri		(substituted off) 94'
DM	99	(Romania) Tudor Băluță
CM	11	(Romania) Ionuț Vînă
RW	10	(Romania) Ianis Hagi (c)
LW	9	(Brazil) Rivaldinho		(substituted off) 63'
FW	13	(Romania) Denis Drăguș		(substituted off) 70'
Substitutes:
GK	1	(Romania) Árpád Tordai		(substituted on) 46'
MF	16	(Romania) Vlad Achim		(substituted on) 94'
MF	17	(Romania) Andrei Ciobanu
FW	18	(Romania) George Ganea
MF	24	(Brazil) Eric	(yellow card) 90+1' (goal) 105+2'	(substituted on) 70'
MF	30	(Romania) Andreias Calcan		(substituted on) 63'
MF	93	(Romania) Andrei Artean
Manager:
(Romania) Gheorghe Hagi

MAN OF THE MATCH

- (Romania) Virgil Ghiță

MATCH OFFICIALS

- Assistant referees:
  - Mircea Orbuleț
  - Marius Nicoară
- Fourth official:
  - Andrei Chivulete
- Additional assistant referees:

MATCH RULES

- 90 minutes.
- 30 minutes of extra-time if necessary.
- Penalty shoot-out if scores still level.
- Seven named substitutes.
- Maximum of three substitutions.
- Plus one available substitution if overtime.
