= 2018–19 FC Astra Giurgiu season =

Astra Giurgiu
2018–19 season
- Chairman: Dănuț Coman
- Manager: Marius Măldărășanu
- Stadium: Marin Anastasovici
- Liga I: 5th
- Cupa României: Runners Up
Home colours	Away colours

The 2018–19 season will be the 48th season of competitive football by Astra Giurgiu. Astra Giurgiu will compete in the Liga I and in Cupa României.

== Previous season positions ==
	Competition	Position
(European Union)	UEFA Europa League	Third qualifying round
(Romania)	Liga I	5th
(Romania)	Cupa României	Quarter-finals

== Competitive ==
=== Liga I ===
The Liga I fixture list was announced on 5 July 2018.

==== Regular season ====
===== Table =====
Pos	Team	Pld	W	D	L	GF	GA	GD	Pts	Qualification
2	FCSB	26	14	7	5	49	29	+20	49	Qualification for the Championship round
3	Universitatea Craiova	26	13	6	7	43	24	+19	45	Qualification for the Championship round
4	Astra Giurgiu	26	11	9	6	36	23	+13	42	Qualification for the Championship round
5	Viitorul Constanța	26	11	5	10	26	27	−1	38	Qualification for the Championship round
6	Sepsi OSK	26	10	7	9	32	25	+7	37	Qualification for the Championship round

Source: LPF (in Romanian), Soccerway
Rules for classification: 1) Points; 2) Head-to-head points; 3) Head-to-head goal difference; 4) Head-to-head goals scored; 5) Goal difference; 6) Goals scored; 7) Play-off.

===== Results summary =====
Overall								Home						Away					
Pld	W	D	L	GF	GA	GD	Pts	W	D	L	GF	GA	GD	W	D	L	GF	GA	GD
26	11	9	6	36	23	+13	42	6	4	3	20	12	+8	5	5	3	16	11	+5

Last updated: 4 March 2019.
Source: Liga I

===== Results by round =====
Round	1	2	3	4	5	6	7	8	9	10	11	12	13	14	15	16	17	18	19	20	21	22	23	24	25	26	27	28	29	30	31	32	33	34	35	36	37	38
Ground	H	A	H	A	H	A	H	A	H	A	H	A	H	A	H	A	H	A	H	A	H	A	H	A	H	A												
Result	W	D	D	D	D	W	D	W	W	L	L	W	L	L	L	L	D	W	W	D	W	D	W	D	W	W												

Updated to match(es) played on 4 March 2019. Source: Liga I
A = Away; H = Home; W = Win; D = Draw; L = Loss

===== Matches =====
Win Draw Loss

21 July 2018 1	Astra Giurgiu	1–0	FCSB	Giurgiu
21:00 EEST (UTC+3)	Llullaku 43' (yellow card) 90+4'; Mrzljak (yellow card) 50'; L.Buş (yellow card) 73'; Balaure (yellow card) 83'	Report	O.Popescu (yellow card) 19'; Planić (yellow card) 63'; J.Morais (yellow card) 90+1'	Stadium: Marin Anastasovici; Attendance: 3,500; Referee: István Kovács (Carei)

28 July 2018 2	Politehnica Iași	1–1	Astra Giurgiu	Iași
21:00 EEST (UTC+3)	O.Mihalache (yellow card) 37'; Frăsinescu 60' (yellow card) 78'; Cioinac (yellow card) 66'; D.Flores (yellow card) 73'	Report	Mrzljak (yellow card) 36'; L.Buş (yellow card) 37'; Iliev (yellow card) 56'; Bejan (yellow card) 58'; Llullaku 81' (pen.)	Stadium: Emil Alexandrescu; Attendance: 4,000; Referee: Cătălin Popa

4 August 2018 3	Astra Giurgiu	1–1	Sepsi Sfântu Gheorghe	Giurgiu
18:00 EEST (UTC+3)	L.Buş 3' (yellow card) 52'; A.Stan (yellow card) 83'	Report	Nouvier (yellow card) 31'; Simonovski 61'	Stadium: Marin Anastasovici; Attendance: 500; Referee: Adrian Viorel Cojocaru

10 August 2018 4	FC Botoșani	1–1	Astra Giurgiu	Botoșani
21:00 EEST (UTC+3)	Ongenda 10'; R.Oaidă (yellow card) 14'; G.Miron (yellow card) 26'; M.Roman (yellow card) 30'; A.Dumitraș (red card) 82'	Report	Mrzljak (yellow card) 17'; Alibec (yellow card) 31'; Bejan 39'	Stadium: Municipal; Attendance: 4,000; Referee: Sebastian Colțescu

18 August 2018 5	Astra Giurgiu	1–1	Dunărea Călărași	Giurgiu
18:00 EEST (UTC+3)	N.Roșu 17' (pen.) (yellow card) 65'; Bègue (yellow card) 30'; Alibec (yellow card) 64' (yellow-red card) 74'; R.Crișan (yellow card) 67'	Report	D.Ispas (yellow card) 16'; Pană 22' (yellow card) 36'; G.Simion (yellow card) 49'; Gligorov (yellow card) 52'; C.N.Pușcaș (yellow card) 64'	Stadium: Marin Anastasovici; Attendance: 200; Referee: Cătălin Ion Buşi

24 August 2018 6	Concordia Chiajna	0–3	Astra Giurgiu	Chiajna
21:00 EEST (UTC+3)	Caparco (yellow card) 78'; Gorobsov (yellow card) 90+3'	Report	Llullaku (yellow card) 17'; Balaure 56'; Biceanu (yellow card) 75'; N.Roșu 80' (pen.), 78'; Bègue 82'	Stadium: Concordia; Attendance: 1,200; Referee: Marcel Bîrsan (Bucharest)

1 September 2018 7	Astra Giurgiu	0–0	FC Voluntari	Giurgiu
18:30 EEST (UTC+3)	Alibec (yellow card) 61'; Erico (yellow card) 90+1'	Report	Căpățînă (yellow card) 44'; Balaur (yellow card) 51'; Răuță (yellow card) 80'; Ricardinho (yellow card) 90+2'	Stadium: Marin Anastasovici; Attendance: 300; Referee: Florin Andrei

14 September 2018 8	Dinamo București	1–2	Astra Giurgiu	Bucharest
21:00 EEST (UTC+3)	Nistor (yellow card) 40'; V.Olteanu (yellow card) 58'; Hanca (yellow card) 69'; Corbu (yellow card) 85'; Subotić 89'	Report	Alibec 13'; Mrzljak (yellow card) 61'; R.Moise 66'; Llullaku (yellow card) 83'; Iliev (yellow card) 90+2'	Stadium: Dinamo; Attendance: 1,500; Referee: István Kovács (Carei)

24 September 2018 9	Astra Giurgiu	3–0	Gaz Metan Mediaș	Giurgiu
21:00 EEST (UTC+3)	Bahamboula 40'; N.Roșu 63', 75'; Radunović (yellow card) 90+1'	Report	D.Olaru (yellow card) 15'; L.Aurélio (yellow card) 25' (yellow-red card) 56'; Fofana (yellow card) 30'; R.Romeo (yellow card) 72'	Stadium: Marin Anastasovici; Attendance: 1,000; Referee: Horațiu Feșnic (Cluj)

30 September 2018 10	Viitorul Constanța	1–0	Astra Giurgiu	Ovidiu
18:00 EEST (UTC+3)	I.Vînă (yellow card) 21'; de Nooijer (yellow card) 32'; S.Mladen (yellow card) 38'; V.Ghiță (yellow card) 45+2'; T.Băluță 90+2'; D.Drăguș (yellow card) 90+5'	Report	Erico (yellow card) 3' (yellow-red card) 34'; Mrzljak (yellow card) 33'	Stadium: Viitorul; Attendance: 2,000; Referee: Marcel Bîrsan (Bucharest)

6 October 2018 11	Astra Giurgiu	1–2	CFR Cluj	Giurgiu
21:00 EEST (UTC+3)	Belu-Iordache (yellow card) 24'; Zoua (yellow card) 67' (goal) 89'	Report	Țucudean 45+1'; T.Moutinho 55'	Stadium: Marin Anastasovici; Attendance: 3,000; Referee: Ovidiu Hațegan

20 October 2018 12	Hermannstadt	0–2	Astra Giurgiu	Târgu Mureș
16:00 EEST (UTC+3)	Pamfile (yellow card) 30'; Mijušković (yellow card) 79'	Report	Llullaku 60' (pen.); Erico 74'; Alibec (yellow card) 86'	Stadium: Trans-Sil; Attendance: 100; Referee: Radu Petrescu

26 October 2018 13	Astra Giurgiu	0–3	Universitatea Craiova	Giurgiu
21:00 EEST (UTC+3)	Alibec (yellow card) 1'	Report	A.Mitriță 38'; Cicâldău 62'; Koljić 72'	Stadium: Marin Anastasovici; Attendance: 2,500; Referee: Alexandru Tudor (Bucharest)

4 November 2018 14	FCSB	1–0	Astra Giurgiu	Bucharest
21:00 EET (UTC+2)	J.Morais (yellow card) 20'; M.Roman (yellow card) 26'; R.Benzar (yellow card) 44'; Gnohéré 67' (pen.)	Report	Llullaku 21'; V.Gheorghe (yellow card) 42'	Stadium: Arena Națională; Attendance: 2,533; Referee: Horațiu Feșnic (Cluj)

10 November 2018 15	Astra Giurgiu	1–2	Politehnica Iași	Giurgiu
15:00 EET (UTC+2)	N.Roșu (yellow card) 33'; V.Gheorghe 45' (yellow card) 50'; Bègue (yellow card) 49'; Bejan (yellow card) 88'	Report	A.Sin (yellow card) 33' (yellow-red card) 41'; Platini 51'; A.Cristea 59' (pen.); Qaka (yellow card) 83'	Stadium: Marin Anastasovici; Attendance: 200; Referee: George Rădulescu

24 November 2018 16	Sepsi Sfântu Gheorghe	1–0	Astra Giurgiu	Sfântu Gheorghe
16:00 EET (UTC+2)	S.Drăghici (yellow card) 24'; Vașvari (yellow card) 69'; Tandia 78'; I.Jovanović (yellow card) 90+1'	Report	Belu-Iordache (yellow card) 71'; Radunović (yellow card) 87'	Stadium: Municipal; Attendance: 2,500; Referee: Marcel Bîrsan (Bucharest)

3 December 2018 17	Astra Giurgiu	1–1	FC Botoșani	Giurgiu
20:00 EET (UTC+2)	Bejan (yellow card) 61'; Belu-Iordache (yellow card) 71' (goal) 74'; Cestor (yellow card) 78'; Mrzljak (yellow card) 88'	Report	Fülöp (yellow card) 50'; A.Burcă 55'; Ongenda (yellow card) 84'	Stadium: Marin Anastasovici; Attendance: 300; Referee: Sebastian Colțescu

6 December 2018 18	Dunărea Călărași	1–2	Astra Giurgiu	Călărași
14:00 EET (UTC+2)	Ndiaye 71'	Report	Mrzljak 11' (yellow card) 90+2'; Bègue 18'; Zoua (yellow card) 57'	Stadium: Ion Comșa; Attendance: 1,500; Referee: Alexandru Tudor (Bucharest)

9 December 2018 19	Astra Giurgiu	3–1	Concordia Chiajna	Giurgiu
17:00 EET (UTC+2)	Bègue 49'; Alibec 76' (pen.) (yellow card) 90+2'; Llullaku 88'; Radunović (yellow card) 90+1'	Report	Leca (yellow card) 37' (goal) 73'; P.Ivanovici (yellow card) 56'	Stadium: Marin Anastasovici; Attendance: 200; Referee: Iulian Dima

15 December 2018 20	FC Voluntari	1–1	Astra Giurgiu	Voluntari
14:00 EET (UTC+2)	Hodorogea 50'; Ricardinho (yellow card) 79'	Report	Zoua (yellow card) 19'; Mrzljak (yellow card) 77'; Belu-Iordache 85'; Alibec (red card) 90+3'	Stadium: Anghel Iordănescu; Attendance: 30; Referee: Ionuţ Coza

20 December 2018 21	Astra Giurgiu	4–1	Dinamo București	Giurgiu
20:00 EET (UTC+2)	Mrzljak (yellow card) 4'; Llullaku 7'; L.Buş 36'; M.Butean (yellow card) 41'; Bègue (yellow card) 63'; V.Gheorghe 68'; N.Roșu 71'	Report	Zenke (yellow card) 33'; Hanca 77'	Stadium: Marin Anastasovici; Attendance: 2,000; Referee: Radu Petrescu

1 February 2019 22	Gaz Metan Mediaș	1–1	Astra Giurgiu	Mediaș
20:00 EET (UTC+2)	Chamed 45+1'; Ivanov (yellow card) 69'; Constantin (yellow card) 82'; Olaru (yellow card) 83'	Summary	Lazar (yellow card) 22'; Erico (yellow card) 22'; Cestor (yellow card) 24'; Bejan (yellow card) 64'; Butean 66'; Radunović (yellow card) 72'	Stadium: Gaz Metan; Attendance: 1,500; Referee: Constantin Sebastian Colțescu

8 February 2019 23	Astra Giurgiu	3–0	Viitorul Constanța	Giurgiu
20:00 EET (UTC+2)	Bègue 28'; Zoua (yellow card) 32'; Alibec 51' 65'; Erico (yellow card) 59'; Cestor (yellow card) 90+2'	Summary	Hagi (yellow card) 4'; Kuipers (yellow card) 30' (red card) 43'; de Nooijer (yellow card) 34'; Drăguș (yellow card) 86'	Stadium: Marin Anastasovici; Attendance: 500; Referee: István Kovács (referee)

16 February 2019 24	CFR Cluj	1–1	Astra Giurgiu	Cluj-Napoca
20:00 EET (UTC+2)	Djoković (yellow card) 14'; Omrani (yellow card) 34'; Paulo Vinícius (yellow card) 37'; Mureșan 53'; Lang (yellow card) 72'	Summary	Butean (yellow card) 14'; Bejan (red card) 30'; Romário (yellow card) 61'; Mrzljak (yellow card) 68'; Radunović 73'; Lazar (yellow card) 90+4'	Stadium: Dr. Constantin Rădulescu; Attendance: 3,000; Referee: Marcel Bîrsan

23 February 2019 25	Astra Giurgiu	1–0	Hermannstadt	Giurgiu
17:00 EET (UTC+2)	Butean 49'; Biceanu (yellow card) 90+1'	Summary	Mățel (yellow card) 28'; Mijušković (yellow card) 34'	Stadium: Marin Anastasovici; Attendance: 1,000; Referee: Andrei Florin Chivulete

4 March 2019 26	Universitatea Craiova	1–2	Astra Giurgiu	Craiova
20:00 EET (UTC+2)	Koljić 49'	Summary	Llullaku 76'; Belu-Iordache (yellow card) 86'; Donkor 87' (o.g.); Radunović (yellow card) 90+1'; Cestor (yellow card) 90+2'; Bejan (yellow card) 90+4'	Stadium: Ion Oblemenco; Attendance: 15,000; Referee: Iulian Călin

==== Championship round ====
===== Table =====
Pos	Team	Pld	W	D	L	GF	GA	GD	Pts	Qualification
1	CFR Cluj (C)	10	7	2	1	15	4	+11	50	Qualification to Champions League first qualifying round
2	FCSB	10	7	2	1	18	6	+12	48	Qualification to Europa League first qualifying round
3	Viitorul Constanța	10	6	2	2	18	10	+8	39	Qualification to Europa League second qualifying round
4	Universitatea Craiova	10	4	1	5	8	10	−2	36	Qualification to Europa League first qualifying round
5	Astra Giurgiu	10	2	0	8	6	20	−14	27	
6	Sepsi OSK	10	0	1	9	5	20	−15	20	

Source: Soccerway, Romanian Football Federation
Rules for classification: 1) Points; 2) Points without rounding; 3) Head-to-head points; 4) Head-to-head goal difference; 5) Head-to-head goals scored; 6) Goal difference; 7) Goals scored; 8) Play-off (only if needed to decide champion or teams for UEFA competitions). (Note: only criteria 6 and 7 are applied to establish the classification during the competition.)
(C) Champions

===== Results summary =====
Overall								Home						Away					
Pld	W	D	L	GF	GA	GD	Pts	W	D	L	GF	GA	GD	W	D	L	GF	GA	GD
10	2	0	8	6	20	−14	6	1	0	4	5	14	−9	1	0	4	1	6	−5

Last updated: 20 May 2019.
Source: Liga I

===== Position by round =====
Round	1	2	3	4	5	6	7	8	9	10
Ground	A	H	A	H	A	H	A	H	A	H
Result	L	L	L	L	W	L	L	L	L	W
Position	5	5	5	5	5	5	5	5	5	5

Updated to match(es) played on 20 May 2019. Source: Liga I
A = Away; H = Home; W = Win; D = Draw; L = Loss

===== Matches =====
Win Draw Loss

10 March 2019 1	Universitatea Craiova	1–0	Astra Giurgiu	Craiova
	Koljić 18'; Martić (yellow card) 43'; Kelić (yellow card) 73'; Mihăilă (yellow card) 80'; Drăghici (yellow card) 84'	Summary	Bègue (yellow card) 27'; Zoua (yellow card) 60'; Radunović (red card) 79'; Romário (yellow card) 90+2'	Stadium: Ion Oblemenco; Attendance: 14,000; Referee: István Kovács (referee)

17 March 2019 2	Astra Giurgiu	0–2	FCSB	Giurgiu
	Bejan (yellow card) 7' (yellow-red card) 74'; Romário (yellow card) 20'; Butean (yellow card) 47'	Report	Júnior Morais (yellow card) 13'; Gnohéré 30'; Cristea 32'; Tănase (yellow card) 76'; Roman (yellow card) 77'	Stadium: Marin Anastasovici; Attendance: 3,700; Referee: Horațiu Mircea Fesnic

30 March 2019 3	CFR Cluj	1–0	Astra Giurgiu	Cluj-Napoca
	Bordeianu 60'; Thierry Moutinho (yellow card) 90+3'	Summary	Llullaku (yellow card) 45'	Stadium: Dr. Constantin Rădulescu; Attendance: 3,000; Referee: Radu Petrescu

8 April 2019 4	Astra Giurgiu	1–4	Viitorul Constanța	Giurgiu
	Romário (yellow card) 14' (yellow-red card) 38'; Alibec 34'; Llullaku (yellow card) 66'; Biceanu (yellow card) 84'; Roșu (yellow card) 90+2'	Summary	Iacob (yellow card) 16'; Ganea 21' 70'; Casap 28'; Mladen (yellow card) 50'; Eric 60'; Tîrcoveanu (yellow card) 63'	Stadium: Marin Anastasovici; Attendance: 1,000; Referee: Iulian Călin

15 April 2019 5	Sepsi Sfântu Gheorghe	0–1	Astra Giurgiu	Sfântu Gheorghe
	Vașvari (yellow card) 72'; Omar (yellow card) 79'	Summary	Mrzljak (yellow card) 56'; Llullaku (yellow card) 60'; Moise (yellow card) 73'; Cestor 88'	Stadium: Municipal; Attendance: 2,500; Referee: George Rădulescu

19 April 2019 6	Astra Giurgiu	0–1	Universitatea Craiova	Giurgiu
	Alibec (yellow card) 57'	Summary	Carlos Fortes (yellow card) 33'; Bancu (yellow card) 63'; Mihăilă 68'; Martić (yellow card) 90+2'	Stadium: Marin Anastasovici; Attendance: 800; Referee: Andrei Florin Chivulete

28 April 2019 7	FCSB	1–0	Astra Giurgiu	Bucharest
	Tănase (yellow card) 45+1' (goal) 55'; Cristea (yellow card) 49'; Filipe Teixeira (yellow card) 77'; Bălgrădean (yellow card) 90+3'	Summary	Moise (yellow card) 48'	Stadium: Arena Națională; Attendance: 3,514; Referee: Radu Petrescu

6 May 2019 8	Astra Giurgiu	1–5	CFR Cluj	Giurgiu
	Llullaku 66' (pen.); Roșu (yellow card) 89'	Summary	Omrani 15'; Djoković 59' 73'; Culio (yellow card) 65'; Bejan 80' (o.g.); Hoban 87'	Stadium: Marin Anastasovici; Attendance: 800; Referee: Adrian Cojocaru

13 May 2019 9	Viitorul Constanța	3–0	Astra Giurgiu	Ovidiu
	Achim (yellow card) 41'; Eric 44' (pen.); Calcan 66'; Drăguș 74' (yellow card) 85'; Kuipers (yellow card) 86'	Report	Llullaku (yellow card) 39'; Cestor (yellow card) 49'; Radunović (yellow card) 57'	Stadium: Viitorul; Attendance: 4,000; Referee: Sorin Antonie

20 May 2019 10	Astra Giurgiu	3–2	Sepsi Sfântu Gheorghe	Giurgiu
	Mrzljak 13'; Balaure 27'; Moise 63'	Report	Tandia 43'; Sîntean (yellow card) 45'; Omar (yellow card) 60'; Hamed (yellow card) 65'; Rudol (yellow card) 76'; Erico 90+2' (o.g.)	Stadium: Marin Anastasovici; Attendance: 100; Referee: Ionu Coza

=== Cupa României ===
Astra Giurgiu will enter the Cupa României at the Round of 32.

27 September 2018 Round of 32	Luceafărul Oradea	1–5	Astra Giurgiu	Sânmartin
16:00	Vlad Opriș (yellow card) 57'; Pop 79'	Summary	Buș (yellow card) 45'; Cestor (yellow card) 49'; Bègue 64'; Zoua 66'; Gheorghe 70' 81' 90'	Stadium: Baza Sportivă Luceafărul Felix; Attendance: 1,200; Referee: Lucian Ruşandu

31 October 2018 Round of 16	Universitatea Cluj	3–4 (a.e.t.)	Astra Giurgiu	Cluj-Napoca
19:00	Abrudan 2' (yellow card) 12' (yellow-red card) 88'; Carol Taub 5' 8'; Dumitrescu (yellow card) 67'; Ursu (yellow card) 90+2'	Summary	Llullaku 14' (pen.) 75'; Cordoș 24' (o.g.); Alibec (yellow card) 29'; Bejan 99'; Lazar (yellow card) 119'	Stadium: Cluj Arena; Attendance: 6,244; Referee: Horia Gabriel Mladinovici

27 February 2019 Quarter Final	Dunărea Călărași	1–2	Astra Giurgiu	Giurgiu
17:00	Sîrghi (yellow card) 18'; Filip (yellow card) 38'; Mapuku (yellow card) 45'; Munteanu 89'	Summary	Hambo 5' 7' (yellow card) 61'; Butean (yellow card) 86'	Stadium: Stadionul Marin Anastasovici; Attendance: 600; Referee: Cătălin Popa

3 April 2019 Semi Final First Leg	CFR Cluj	1–3	Astra Giurgiu	Cluj-Napoca
20:00	Bud 15'; Maleš (yellow card) 52'; Deac (yellow card) 69'	Summary	Gheorghe 4'; Bègue 35'; Butean 52'; Mrzljak (yellow card) 69'	Stadium: Stadionul Dr. Constantin Rădulescu; Attendance: 2,500; Referee: Andrei Florin Chivulete

24 April 2019 Semi Final Second Leg	Astra Giurgiu	2–2 (5–3 agg.)	CFR Cluj	Giurgiu
19:45	Butean 34'; Alibec 37' (pen.)	Summary	Peteleu (yellow card) 16'; Costache (yellow card) 35' (goal) 42' 66'; Maleš (yellow card) 68'	Stadium: Stadionul Marin Anastasovici; Attendance: 1,000; Referee: Marcel Bîrsan

25 May 2019 Final	Astra Giurgiu	1–2 (a.e.t.)	Viitorul Constanța	Ploiești
20:00	Mrzljak (yellow card) 32'; Alibec 41'; Romário (yellow card) 44' (yellow-red card) 81'; Llullaku (yellow card) 68'; Erico (yellow card) 108'	Report	Ghiță 76'; Eric (yellow card) 90+1' (goal) 105+1'; Mladen (yellow card) 99'	Stadium: Ilie Oană Stadium; Attendance: 11,968; Referee: Radu Petrescu

== See also ==
- 2018–19 Cupa României
- 2018–19 Liga I
