= 2024–25 FC Hermannstadt season =

FC Hermannstadt
2024–25 season
- Manager: Marius Măldărășanu
- Stadium: Sibiu Municipal Stadium
- Liga I: 16th
- Cupa României: Pre-season
- Top goalscorer: League: Florin Bejan; Alessandro Murgia (1 each); All: Florin Bejan; Alessandro Murgia (1 each)
- Average home league attendance: 4,006
- Biggest defeat: Universitatea Cluj 3–1 Hermannstadt
Home colours	Away colours	Third colours

The 2024–25 season is the tenth season in the history of FC Hermannstadt, and the club's third consecutive season in Liga I. In addition to the domestic league, the team is scheduled to participate in the Cupa României.

== Transfers ==
=== In ===
Pos.	Player	Transferred from	Fee	Date	Source
DF	(Romania) Tiberiu Căpușă	(Romania) UTA Arad	Free	1 July 2024	
DF	(Portugal) Tiago Gonçalves	(Portugal) Os Belenenses	Free	2 July 2024	
FW	(Romania) Jovan Marković	(Romania) Universitatea Craiova	Loan	17 July 2024	

=== Out ===
Pos.	Player	Transferred to	Fee	Date	Source
DF	(Romania) Raul Opruț	(Belgium) Kortrijk	Loan return	30 June 2024	
FW	(Romania) Daniel Paraschiv	(Spain) Real Oviedo	Undisclosed	13 July 2024	
MF	(Romania) Petrișor Petrescu	(Romania) Argeș Pitești	Undisclosed	22 July 2024	

== Friendlies ==
=== Pre-season ===
15 June 2024 Friendly	Hermannstadt (Romania)	1–0	(Romania) Gloria Buzău
17:00	Bejan 15'

25 June 2024 Friendly	Hermannstadt (Romania)	1–2	(Azerbaijan) Zira	Turkey
16:30	88'		68'; 78'

26 June 2024 Friendly	Hermannstadt (Romania)	0–1	(Romania) Petrolul Ploiești	Bolu, Turkey
16:30 UTC+3			Tolea 21'

=== Mid-season ===
7 January 2025 Friendly	Hermannstadt (Romania)	3–0	(Germany) Alemannia Aachen

11 January 2025 Friendly	Hermannstadt (Romania)	0–0	(Uzbekistan) Neftchi Fergana

12 January 2025 Friendly	Napredak Kruševac (Serbia)	0–1	(Romania) Hermannstadt

== Competitions ==
=== Overall record ===
Competition	First match	Last match	Starting round	Record							
Competition	First match	Last match	Starting round	Pld	W	D	L	GF	GA	GD	Win %
Liga I	12 July 2024		Matchday 1	4	0	2	2	2	5	−3	0.00
Cupa României				0	0	0	0	0	0	+0	—
Total				4	0	2	2	2	5	−3	0.00

Last updated: 2 August 2024
Source: Soccerway

=== Liga I ===
==== League table ====
Pos	Team	Pld	W	D	L	GF	GA	GD	Pts	Advances
6	Rapid București	30	11	13	6	35	26	+9	46	Qualification for play-off round
7	Sepsi OSK	30	11	8	11	38	35	+3	41 (Note: Ranked on head-to-head goal difference: Sepsi (+3); Hermannstadt (-3).)	Qualification for play-out round
8	Hermannstadt	30	11	8	11	34	40	−6	41	Qualification for play-out round
9	Petrolul Ploiești	30	9	13	8	29	29	0	40	Qualification for play-out round
10	Farul Constanța	30	8	11	11	29	38	−9	35	Qualification for play-out round

Source: LPF (in Romanian)
Rules for classification: 1) Points; 2) Head-to-head points; 3) Head-to-head goal difference; 4) Head-to-head goals scored; 5) Goal difference; 6) Goals scored; 7) Play-off.

==== Results summary ====
Overall								Home						Away					
Pld	W	D	L	GF	GA	GD	Pts	W	D	L	GF	GA	GD	W	D	L	GF	GA	GD
4	0	2	2	2	5	−3	2	0	2	0	1	1	0	0	0	2	1	4	−3

Last updated: 2 August 2024.

==== Results by round ====
Round	1	2	3	4
Ground	H	A	H	A
Result	D	L	D	L
Position	9	14	15	16

Updated to match(es) played on 2 August 2024. Source:
A = Away; H = Home; W = Win; D = Draw; L = Loss

==== Matches ====
The match schedule was released on 1 July 2024.

12 July 2024 1	Hermannstadt	0–0	Universitatea Craiova	Sibiu
21:30 UTC+3	Balaure (yellow card) 90+4'		Paradela (yellow card) 25'	Stadium: Sibiu Municipal Stadium; Attendance: 6,000; Referee: Szabolcs Kovacs

21 July 2024 2	Universitatea Cluj	3–1	Hermannstadt	Cluj-Napoca
19:00 UTC+3	Blănuță 7', 37'; Nistor 20' (pen.)		Bejan 41'	Stadium: Cluj Arena; Referee: Horia Gabriel Mladinovici

26 July 2024 3	Hermannstadt	1–1	Unirea Slobozia	Sibiu
19:00 UTC+3	Murgia 6'; Ivanov (yellow card) 9'; Biceanu (yellow card) 58'; Neguț (yellow card) 67'; Oroian (yellow card) 90'		Pospelov 40'; Aganović (yellow card) 67'; Medina (yellow card) 72'; Bărbuț (yellow card) 90+4'	Stadium: Sibiu Municipal Stadium; Referee: Rareş George Vidican

2 August 2024 4	Oțelul Galați	1–0	Hermannstadt	Galați
19:00 UTC+3	Bejan 86'			Stadium: Oțelul Stadium; Referee: Horațiu Feșnic
