= Miguel Santos (footballer) =

Portuguese footballer

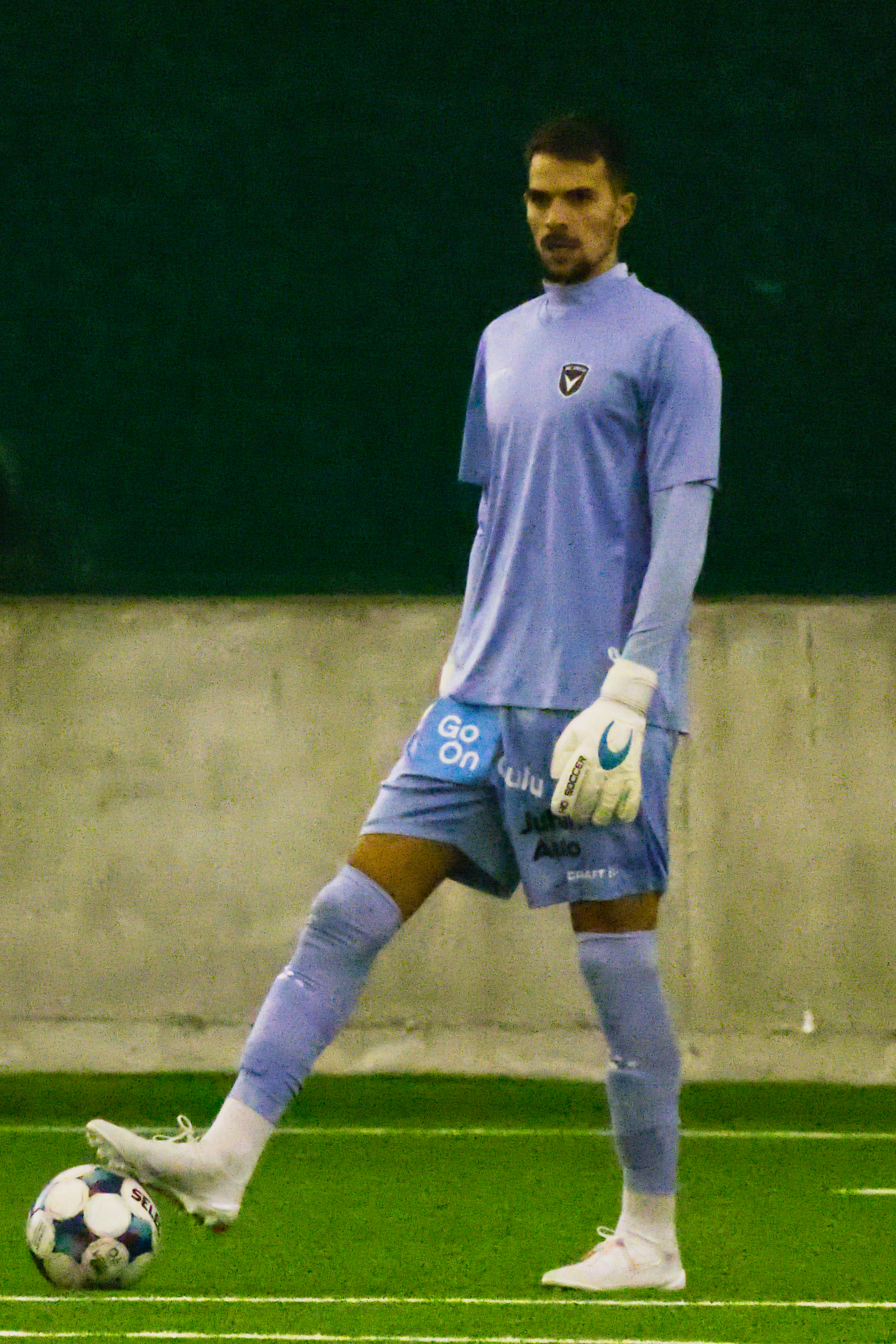
- Santos with AC Oulu in 2026

Personal information
- Full name: Miguel José Oliveira Silva Santos
- Date of birth: 21 October 1994 (age 32)
- Place of birth: Paço de Arcos, Portugal
- Height: 1.93 m (6 ft 4 in)
- Position: Goalkeeper

Team information
- Current team: AC Oulu
- Number: 13

Youth career
- 2003–2007: Benfica
- 2007–2008: SC Lourel
- 2008–2010: Belenenses
- 2010–2012: Estoril
- 2012–2013: Benfica

Senior career*
Years	Team	Apps	(Gls)
2013–2016	Benfica B	51	(0)
2016–2017	Port Vale	0	(0)
2017–2018	Fortuna Sittard	43	(0)
2018–2021	Astra Giurgiu	2	(0)
2019–2020	→ Academica Clinceni (loan)	8	(0)
2020–2021	Roda	8	(0)
2021–2022	Mafra	23	(0)
2022–2023	Trofense	15	(0)
2023–2024	Olympiakos Nicosia	26	(0)
2024–2025	Anadia	0	(0)
2025	Jaro	26	(0)
2026–	AC Oulu	29	(0)
- * Club domestic league appearances and goals as of 12 November 2026

Miguel José Oliveira Silva Santos (born 21 October 1994) is a Portuguese professional footballer who plays as a goalkeeper for Veikkausliiga club AC Oulu.

Santos spent his youth with Benfica, SC Lourel, Belenenses, and Estoril, before spending the 2015–16 season as Benfica B's first-choice goalkeeper. He signed with English club Port Vale for five months in August 2016 before moving on to Eerste Divisie side Fortuna Sittard in January 2017. He helped Fortuna win promotion out of the Eerste Divisie at the end of the 2017–18 season. He signed with Romanian side Astra Giurgiu in August 2018 and was loaned out to Academica Clinceni for the 2019–20 season. He joined the Dutch club Roda in October 2020 and then returned to Portugal to sign for Mafra in July 2021. He moved on to Trofense 12 months later. He joined Cypriot club Olympiakos Nicosia in July 2023. He joined Finnish club Jaro via Anadia in February 2025 and moved on to AC Oulu the following year.

== Career ==
=== Benfica B ===
Santos joined Benfica's junior team from Estoril in 2013. He made his Segunda Liga debut for Benfica B in a 3–2 defeat to Atlético CP at the Benfica Campus on 17 August, when he came on as a substitute for Wei Huang following goalkeeper Bruno Varela's sending off. He made one further appearance in the 2013–14 campaign before he established himself as Benfica B's first choice goalkeeper in February 2015 and played ten games at the end of the 2014–15 season. He played 37 of Benfica B's 46 league games in the 2015–16 season.

=== Port Vale ===
On 31 August 2016, Santos signed a two-year contract with English League One club Port Vale. He had already been training at Vale Park for several weeks before signing, and said that he aimed to replace Jak Alnwick as the club's first choice goalkeeper. He made his debut for the "Valiants" in a 1–0 defeat to Mansfield Town in an EFL Trophy Northern Group E match at Vale Park on 4 October. He made a second appearance in the same competition, keeping a clean sheet and saving two penalties in the resulting shoot-out with Doncaster Rovers; first-team coach Andy Smith praised Santos after the game, saying "It was an outstanding performance... he is a top quality goalkeeper". After Michael Brown succeeded Bruno Ribeiro as manager, Santos left the club by mutual consent in January 2017.

=== Fortuna Sittard ===
Santos joined the Dutch Eerste Divisie club Fortuna Sittard in January 2017. He played 19 league games for Fortuna in the second half of the 2016–17 season. He played 25 matches for "Fortunezen" during the 2017–18 season as the club won promotion to the Eredivisie as runners-up of the Eerste Divisie.

=== Astra Giurgiu ===
On 15 August 2018, Santos signed a four-year contract with Romanian Liga I club Astra Giurgiu. Manager Marius Măldărășanu expected him to compete with Bulgarian goalkeeper Plamen Iliev for a first-team place. However, he remained only a back-up to David Lazar and was restricted to four appearances at the Stadionul Marin Anastasovici in the 2018–19 season, and was an unused substitute in the Cupa României final defeat to Viitorul Constanța at the Ilie Oană Stadium. On 19 August 2019, he joined Liga I rivals Academica Clinceni on loan for the rest of the 2019–20 season.

=== Roda JC Kerkrade ===
On 5 October 2020, he returned to the Netherlands and signed with Eerste Divisie club Roda JC Kerkrade. He featured nine times in the 2020–21 campaign as Groningen loanee Jan Hoekstra was preferred in goal.

=== Return to Portugal ===
On 30 July 2021, he returned to Portugal and signed with Mafra. Manager Ricardo Sousa selected him for 23 of Mafra's 34 league games, with Brazilian Renan playing the other 11. On 21 July 2022, he signed with league rivals Trofense, where manager Jorge Casquilha was looking for him to provide competition for Tiago Silva. On 7 November, he scored a bizarre own goal after Benfica B goalkeeper Samuel Soares hit the crossbar with a kick from his own half and the ball rebounded into Santos and over the goal line. He played 17 games in the 2022–23 campaign as Trofense were relegated into Liga 3.

=== Later career ===
In July 2023, he joined newly relegated Cypriot Second Division club Olympiakos Nicosia on a one-year contract, with the option of a further year. He spent the first half of the 2024–25 season with Anadia in Liga 3 Portugal.

On 3 February 2025, Santos moved to Finland and signed with newly-promoted Veikkausliiga club Jaro. He signed for Finnish club AC Oulu for the 2026 Veikkausliiga season.

== Career statistics ==
As of match played 28 February 2026

Appearances and goals by club, season and competition
Club	Season	League			National cup (Note: Includes Taça de Portugal, FA Cup, KNVB Cup, Cupa României, Cypriot Cup and Suomen Cup)		League cup (Note: Includes Taça da Liga, EFL League Cup and Finnish League Cup)		Other		Total	
Club	Season	Division	Apps	Goals	Apps	Goals	Apps	Goals	Apps	Goals	Apps	Goals
Benfica B	2012–13	Segunda Liga	0	0	0	0	0	0	–		0	0
Benfica B	2013–14	Segunda Liga	2	0	0	0	0	0	–		2	0
Benfica B	2014–15	Segunda Liga	12	0	0	0	0	0	–		12	0
Benfica B	2015–16	LigaPro	37	0	0	0	0	0	–		37	0
Benfica B	2016–17	LigaPro	0	0	0	0	0	0	–		0	0
Benfica B	Total		51	0	0	0	0	0	0	0	51	0
Port Vale	2016–17	League One	0	0	1	0	0	0	2 (Note: Appearance(s) in the EFL Trophy.)	0	3	0
Fortuna Sittard	2016–17	Eerste Divisie	19	0	0	0	–		–		19	0
Fortuna Sittard	2017–18	Eerste Divisie	24	0	1	0	–		–		25	0
Fortuna Sittard	Total		43	0	1	0	0	0	0	0	44	0
Astra Giurgiu	2018–19	Liga I	2	0	2	0	–		–		4	0
Astra Giurgiu	2019–20	Liga I	0	0	0	0	–		–		0	0
Astra Giurgiu	2020–21	Liga I	0	0	0	0	–		–		0	0
Astra Giurgiu	Total		2	0	2	0	0	0	0	0	4	0
Academica Clinceni (loan)	2019–20	Liga I	8	0	2	0	–		–		10	0
Roda JC Kerkrade	2020–21	Eerste Divisie	8	0	1	0	–		–		9	0
Mafra	2021–22	Liga Portugal 2	23	0	1	0	0	0	–		24	0
Trofense	2022–23	Liga Portugal 2	15	0	0	0	2	0	–		17	0
Olympiakos Nicosia	2023–24	Cypriot Second Division	26	0	1	0	–		–		27	0
Anadia	2024–25	Liga 3	0	0	3	0	0	0	–		3	0
Jaro	2025	Veikkausliiga	26	0	3	0	3	0	–		32	0
AC Oulu	2026	Veikkausliiga	0	0	0	0	5	0	–		5	0
Career total			202	0	15	0	10	0	2	0	229	0

== Honours ==
Fortuna Sittard

- Eerste Divisie second-place promotion: 2017–18

Astra Giurgiu

- Cupa României runner-up: 2019
