= Paul Costa =

Paul Costa may refer to:

- Paul Costa (American football) (1941–2015), American football player
- Paul Costa (politician) (born 1959), American politician
- Paul Costa (skier) (born 1971), Australian Olympic skier
- Paul Costa Jr. (fl. 1970s–2020s), American psychologist

== See also ==
- Paul Costea (born 1999), Romanian professional footballer
