= Claudiu Belu =

Romanian footballer (born 1993)

Personal information
- Full name: Claudiu Belu-Iordache
- Date of birth: 7 November 1993 (age 33)
- Place of birth: Timișoara, Romania
- Height: 1.85 m (6 ft 1 in)
- Position: Right-back

Youth career
- 2003–2006: UM Timișoara
- 2006–2011: Politehnica Timișoara

Senior career*
Years	Team	Apps	(Gls)
2012	Politehnica Timișoara	6	(0)
2012–2013	Concordia Chiajna	23	(2)
2013–2016	ACS Poli Timișoara	76	(5)
2016–2017	ASA Târgu Mureș	11	(0)
2017–2019	Astra Giurgiu	55	(6)
2019–2020	FCSB	5	(0)
2020	→ Voluntari (loan)	14	(1)
2020–2021	Hermannstadt	24	(1)
2021–2023	Rapid București	31	(0)
2023–2024	Politehnica Iași	3	(0)
2024	Concordia Chiajna	2	(0)
2025–2026	SCM Râmnicu Vâlcea	0	(0)

International career
2013–2014	Romania U21	4	(0)
- * Club domestic league appearances and goals as of 20 April 2024

Claudiu Belu-Iordache (born 7 November 1993) is a Romanian professional footballer who plays as a right-back.

== Club career ==
=== Politehnica Timișoara ===
Belu he started his career playing for the club in his hometown Politehnica Timișoara.He made his senior debut playing all the 90 minutes in a game which his team won 2–0 away from home against Bihor Oradea in Liga II on 17 March 2012.

=== Concordia Chiajna ===
In June 2012, Belu joined Liga I side Concordia Chiajna.

=== Poli Timișoara ===
On 28 June 2013, Poli Timișoara announced the signing of Belu.

=== Târgu Mureș ===
In August 2016, Belu signed a one-year contract with Liga I club Târgu Mureș.

=== Astra Giurgiu ===
On 10 January 2017, Belu joined Liga I side Astra Giurgiu. On 31 March 2019, Astra Giurgiu decided to terminate the player's contract because ’’ Belu had a different point of view than his colleagues and taking into account his contractual situation, today the two sides, the club and the player decided the amicable termination of the commitment'’, announced the club in a press release on the official site.

=== FCSB ===
In March 2019, Belu agreed to join Liga I club FCSB, effective from 1 July 2019.

=== Voluntari ===
On 24 January 2020, Belu joined Liga I club Voluntari until the end of the season.

=== Rapid Bucuresti ===
On 16 June 2021, Rapid announced the signing of Belu.

== Career statistics ==
As of 20 April 2024

Appearances and goals by club, season and competition
Club	Season	League			Cupa României		Europe		Other		Total	
Club	Season	Division	Apps	Goals	Apps	Goals	Apps	Goals	Apps	Goals	Apps	Goals
Politehnica Timișoara	2011–12	Liga II	6	0	0	0	—		—		6	0
Concordia Chiajna	2012–13	Liga I	23	2	3	0	—		—		26	2
ACS Poli Timișoara	2013–14	Liga I	19	1	2	0	—		—		21	1
ACS Poli Timișoara	2014–15	Liga II	25	4	0	0	—		—		25	4
ACS Poli Timișoara	2015–16	Liga I	32	0	2	0	—		2 (Note: Appearances in Cupa Ligii)	0	36	0
ACS Poli Timișoara	Total		76	5	4	0	0	0	2	0	82	5
ASA Târgu Mureș	2016–17	Liga I	11	0	—		—		2	0	13	0
Astra Giurgiu	2016–17	Liga I	5	1	1	0	—		—		6	1
Astra Giurgiu	2017–18	Liga I	27	3	1	0	4 (Note: Appearances in UEFA Europa League)	0	—		32	3
Astra Giurgiu	2018–19	Liga I	23	2	2	0	—		—		25	2
Astra Giurgiu	Total		55	6	4	0	4	0	0	0	63	6
FCSB	2019–20	Liga I	5	0	1	0	3	0	—		8	0
Voluntari (loan)	2019–20	Liga I	14	1	—		—		—		14	1
Hermannstadt	2020–21	Liga I	24	1	1	0	—		2 (Note: Appearances in Liga I promotion/relegation play-offs)	0	27	1
Rapid București	2021–22	Liga I	26	0	0	0	—		—		26	0
Rapid București	2022–23	Liga I	5	0	2	0	—		—		7	0
Rapid București	Total		31	0	2	0	—		—		33	0
Politehnica Iași	2023–24	Liga I	3	0	1	0	—		—		4	0
Concordia Chiajna	2023–24	Liga II	2	0	—		—		—		2	0
Career total			250	15	16	0	7	0	6	0	279	15

== Honours ==
Politehnica Timișoara

- Liga II: 2011–12

ACS Poli Timișoara

- Liga II: 2014–15

Astra Giurgiu

- Cupa României runner-up: 2016–17, 2018–19
