= 2016 Supercupa României =

- Event: 2016 Supercupa României
Astra Giurgiu	CFR Cluj
Liga I	Cupa României
1	0
- Date: 16 July 2016
- Venue: Cluj Arena, Cluj-Napoca
- Man of the Match: William De Amorim
- Referee: István Kovács
- Attendance: 9,980
- Weather: Rainy

The 2016 Supercupa României was the 18th edition of Romania's season opener cup competition. The game was contested between Liga I title holders, Astra Giurgiu, and Romanian Cup holders, CFR Cluj. It was played at Cluj Arena in Cluj-Napoca in July. Astra won the trophy for the second time in its history, after defeating CFR Cluj with 1–0

== Match ==
=== Details ===
16 July 2016
21:45 EET (UTC+02)

Astra Giurgiu	1–0	CFR Cluj
William De Amorim 86'	Report

Cluj Arena, Cluj-Napoca
Attendance: 9,980
Referee: István Kovács

Astra Giurgiu	CFR Cluj

GK	1	(Romania) Silviu Lung Jr.	(substituted off) 46'
RB	32	(Albania) Kristi Vangjeli
CB	4	(Brazil) Fabrício Silva
CB	2	(Portugal) Geraldo Alves
LB	13	(Brazil) Júnior Morais (c)
CM	31	(Romania) Alexandru Ioniță
DM	20	(Romania) Florin Lovin (substituted off) 84'
CM	23	(Brazil) Fernando Boldrin (yellow card) 74'
RW	24	(France) Damien Boudjemaa	(substituted off) 61'
LW	91	(Brazil) William De Amorim	86'
FW	80	(Portugal) Filipe Teixeira (yellow card) 58'
Substitutes:
GK	12	(Romania) George Gavrilaș	(substituted on) 46'
FW	11	(Romania) Daniel Florea	(substituted on) 61'
MF	14	(Romania) Romario Moise
DF	15	(Romania) Cristian Oroș	(substituted on) 84'
MF	19	(Senegal) Boubacar Mansaly
MF	77	(Romania) Alexandru Stan
MF	96	(Romania) Silviu Balaure
Manager:
(Romania) Marius Șumudică

GK	28	(Romania) Traian Marc
RB	22	(Portugal) Tiago Lopes (yellow card) 45'
CB	6	(Romania) Ionuț Larie (yellow card) 38'
CB	30	(Romania) Andrei Mureșan
LB	45	(Portugal) Mario Camora (c)
RM	17	(Croatia) Antonio Jakoliš (yellow card) 20' (substituted off) 88'
CM	10	(Italy) Davide Petrucci (yellow card) 15'
CM	25	(Spain) Juan Carlos
LM	7	(Romania) Alexandru Păun (yellow card) 41'
ST	21	(Romania) Sergiu Negruț (substituted off) 46'
ST	26	(Romania) Cristian Bud (substituted off) 70'
Substitutes:
GK	1	(Romania) Mihai Mincă
DF	4	(Romania) Răzvan Horj
FW	9	(Portugal) Guima (substituted on) 70'
FW	11	(Spain) Cristian López	(yellow card) 75' (substituted on) 46'
DF	14	(Romania) Andrei Tânc
MF	16	(Romania) Szilard Veres
MF	19	(France) Bryan Nouvier	(substituted on) 88'
Manager:
(Romania) Vasile Miriuță

Man of the match

- (Brazil) William De Amorim (Astra Giurgiu)

Match rules

- 90 minutes.
- Penalty shoot-out if score's still level.
- Seven named substitutes.
- Maximum of three substitutions.

== See also ==
- 2016–17 Liga I
- 2016–17 Cupa României
