= Alexandru Oroian =

Romanian professional footballer

Personal information
- Full name: Alexandru Laurențiu Oroian
- Date of birth: 27 January 2001 (age 25)
- Place of birth: Warsaw, Poland
- Height: 1.75 m (5 ft 9 in)
- Positions: Winger; right-back

Team information
- Current team: 1599 Șelimbăr
- Number: 28

Youth career
- Școala de Fotbal Marius Baciu Mediaș
- –2014: Interstar Sibiu
- 2014–2018: Arsenal
- 2018–2019: DAC Dunajská Streda

Senior career*
Years	Team	Apps	(Gls)
2019–2021	UTA Arad	37	(2)
2021–2026	Hermannstadt	116	(7)
2026	→ ASA Târgu Mureș (loan)	10	(0)
2026–	1599 Șelimbăr	9	(0)

International career
2021	Romania U20	1	(0)
- * Club domestic league appearances and goals as of 31 October 2026

Alexandru Laurențiu Oroian (born 27 January 2001) is a Romanian professional footballer who plays as a winger or a right-back for Liga II club 1599 Șelimbăr.

== Career statistics ==
As of match played 31 October 2026

Appearances and goals by club, season and competition
Club	Season	League			Cupa României		Europe		Other		Total	
Club	Season	Division	Apps	Goals	Apps	Goals	Apps	Goals	Apps	Goals	Apps	Goals
UTA Arad	2018–19	Liga II	7	2	0	0	—		—		7	2
UTA Arad	2019–20	Liga II	21	0	1	0	—		—		22	0
UTA Arad	2020–21	Liga I	9	0	0	0	—		—		9	0
UTA Arad	Total		37	2	1	0	—		—		38	2
Hermannstadt	2020-21	Liga I	2	0	—		—		1 (Note: Appearance in promotion-relegation play-offs)	0	3	0
Hermannstadt	2021–22	Liga II	24	3	0	0	—		—		24	3
Hermannstadt	2022–23	Liga I	33	2	2	0	—		—		35	2
Hermannstadt	2023–24	Liga I	26	2	3	1	—		—		29	3
Hermannstadt	2024–25	Liga I	16	0	5	0	—		—		21	0
Hermannstadt	2025–26	Liga I	15	0	2	1	—		—		17	1
Hermannstadt	Total		116	7	12	2	—		1	0	129	9
ASA Târgu Mureș (loan)	2025-26	Liga II	10	0	—		—		—		10	0
1599 Șelimbăr	2026-27	Liga II	9	0	—		—		—		9	0
Career total			172	9	13	2	—		1	0	186	11

== Honours ==
UTA Arad

- Liga II: 2019–20

Hermannstadt

- Cupa României runner-up: 2024–25
