= Filip Mrzljak =

Croatian footballer (born 1993)

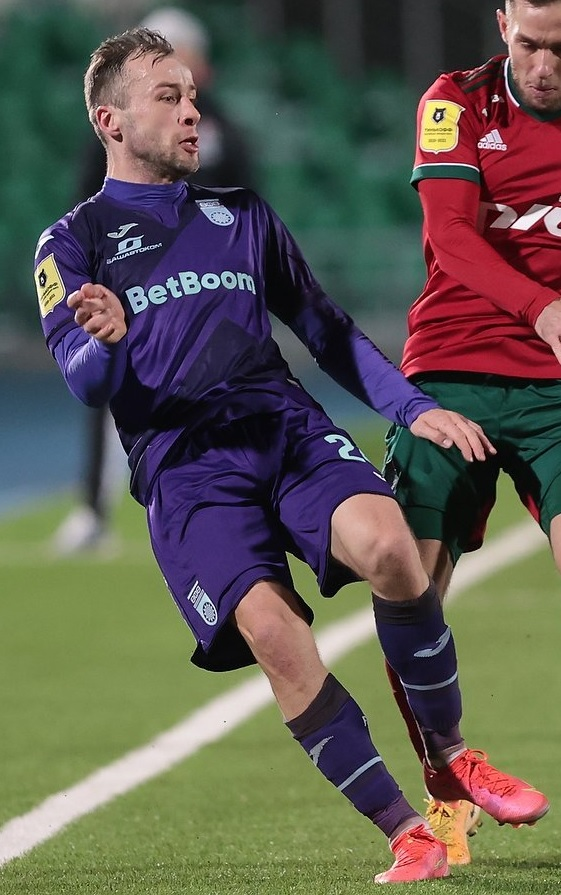
- Mrzljak with FC Ufa in 2021

Personal information
- Full name: Filip Mrzljak
- Date of birth: 16 April 1993 (age 33)
- Place of birth: Zagreb, Croatia
- Height: 1.75 m (5 ft 9 in)
- Position: Attacking midfielder

Team information
- Current team: First Vienna
- Number: 6

Youth career
- 2004–2011: Dinamo Zagreb

Senior career*
Years	Team	Apps	(Gls)
2011–2012	Dinamo Zagreb	0	(0)
2011–2012	→ Radnik Sesvete (loan)	20	(0)
2012–2015	Lokomotiva	33	(0)
2015–2016	Pandurii Târgu Jiu	45	(5)
2017–2019	Astra Giurgiu	55	(2)
2019–2020	Dinamo București	24	(2)
2020–2022	Ufa	38	(4)
2023–2024	HNK Gorica	42	(0)
2024–2025	Punjab	17	(4)
2025–2026	Ufa	20	(2)
2026–	First Vienna	4	(0)

International career^{‡}
2007	Croatia U14	1	(0)
2008	Croatia U15	4	(0)
2009	Croatia U17	2	(0)
2011	Croatia U18	4	(0)
2010–2012	Croatia U19	16	(0)
2012–2013	Croatia U20	9	(0)
2013	Croatia U21	5	(0)
- * Club domestic league appearances and goals as of 7 October 2026 ‡ National team caps and goals as of 11 June 2018

Filip Mrzljak (born 16 April 1993) is a Croatian professional footballer who plays as a midfielder for 2. Liga club First Vienna.

== Club career ==
He joined Dinamo București in June 2019. He left the club after only one season.

On 10 December 2022, Mrzljak signed a one-and-a-half-year contract with Croatian Football League club HNK Gorica, after leaving Ufa as a free agent in July 2022.

== Honours ==
Astra Giurgiu

- Cupa României runner-up: 2018–19

== Career statistics ==
As of 16 May 2026

Club	Season	League			Cup		Continental		Other		Total	
Club	Season	Division	Apps	Goals	Apps	Goals	Apps	Goals	Apps	Goals	Apps	Goals
Radnik Sesvete	2011–12	Second Football League	20	0	1	0	–		–		21	0
Lokomotiva	2012–13	Croatian Football League	16	0	2	0	–		–		18	0
Lokomotiva	2013–14	Croatian Football League	14	0	0	0	2 (Note: Appearances in the UEFA Europa League)	0	–		16	0
Lokomotiva	2014–15	Croatian Football League	3	0	1	0	–		–		4	0
Lokomotiva	Total		33	0	3	0	2	0	0	0	38	0
Pandurii Târgu Jiu	2014–15	Liga I	8	2	–		–		1 (Note: Appearances in the Cupa Ligii)	0	9	2
Pandurii Târgu Jiu	2015–16	Liga I	25	1	2	0	–		1	0	28	1
Pandurii Târgu Jiu	2016–17	Liga I	12	2	–		2	0	–		14	2
Pandurii Târgu Jiu	Total		45	5	2	0	2	0	2	0	51	5
Astra Giurgiu	2017–18	Liga I	29	0	1	0	4	0	–		34	0
Astra Giurgiu	2018–19	Liga I	26	2	4	0	–		–		30	2
Astra Giurgiu	Total		55	2	5	0	4	0	0	0	64	2
Dinamo București	2019–20	Liga I	24	2	2	0	–		–		26	2
Ufa	2020–21	Russian Premier League	15	4	1	0	–		–		16	4
Ufa	2021–22	Russian Premier League	23	0	2	0	–		2 (Note: Appearances in relegation play-offs)	0	27	0
Ufa	Total		38	4	3	0	0	0	2	0	43	4
HNK Gorica	2022-23	Croatian Football League	12	0	–		–		–		12	0
HNK Gorica	2023-24	Croatian Football League	30	0	2 (Note: Appearance in Croatian Football Cup)	0	–		–		32	0
HNK Gorica	Total		42	0	2	0	0	0	2	0	44	0
Punjab	2024–25	Indian Super League	17	4	1 (Note: Appearances in Super Cup)	0	–		4 (Note: Appearances in Durand Cup)	2	22	6
Ufa	2025–26	Russian First League	20	2	1	0	–		–		21	2
Career total			294	19	20	0	8	0	8	2	330	21
