= Romario Moise =

Romanian footballer (born 1996)

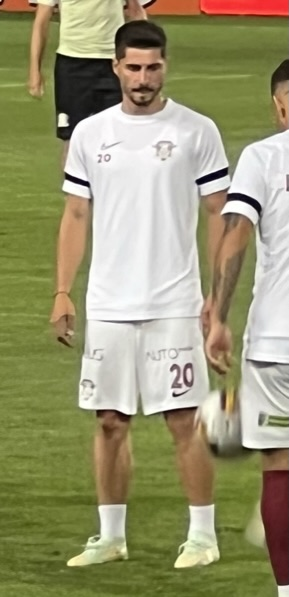
- Moise with Rapid București in 2022

Personal information
- Full name: Romario Florin Moise
- Date of birth: 21 September 1996 (age 30)
- Place of birth: Ploiești, Romania
- Height: 1.78 m (5 ft 10 in)
- Position: Attacking midfielder

Team information
- Current team: FC Bacău
- Number: 27

Youth career
- –2015: Astra Giurgiu

Senior career*
Years	Team	Apps	(Gls)
2015–2021	Astra Giurgiu	70	(6)
2019–2020	→ UTA Arad (loan)	22	(8)
2021	→ Petrolul Ploiești (loan)	6	(1)
2021–2022	Rapid București	24	(2)
2023	Beroe	11	(1)
2023–2024	Concordia Chiajna	9	(1)
2024–2025	Ceahlăul Piatra Neamț	6	(0)
2025	Politehnica Iași	0	(0)
2025–	FC Bacău	16	(4)
- * Club domestic league appearances and goals as of 18 October 2026

Romario Florin Moise (born 21 September 1996) is a Romanian professional footballer who plays as an attacking midfielder for Liga II club FC Bacău.

== Personal life ==
His name is Romario because his father, who is named Beckenbauer after the German international footballer Franz Beckenbauer, was a fan of Brazil's 1994 World Cup winning team and his favorite player from that team was Romário. He has a younger brother who also plays football and his name is Antonio after Italian International footballer Antonio Conte.

== Career statistics ==
As of match played 18 October 2026

Appearances and goals by club, season and competition
Club	Season	League			National cup (Note: Includes Cupa României)		Continental		Other		Total	
Club	Season	Division	Apps	Goals	Apps	Goals	Apps	Goals	Apps	Goals	Apps	Goals
Astra Giurgiu	2015–16	Liga I	1	0	1	0	0	0	1 (Note: Appearance in Cupa Ligii)	0	3	0
Astra Giurgiu	2016–17	Liga I	9	0	1	0	0	0	1	0	11	0
Astra Giurgiu	2017–18	Liga I	23	4	3	2	1 (Note: Appearance in UEFA Europa League)	0	—		27	6
Astra Giurgiu	2018–19	Liga I	21	2	2	0	—		—		23	2
Astra Giurgiu	2019–20	Liga I	3	0	1	0	—		—		4	0
Astra Giurgiu	2020–21	Liga I	13	0	1	0	—		—		14	0
Astra Giurgiu	Total		70	6	9	2	1	0	2	0	82	8
UTA Arad (loan)	2019–20	Liga II	22	8	1	1	—		—		23	9
Petrolul Ploiești (loan)	2020–21	Liga II	6	1	2	1	—		—		8	2
Rapid București	2021–22	Liga I	23	2	2	0	—		—		25	2
Rapid București	2022–23	Liga I	1	0	—		—		—		1	0
Rapid București	Total		24	2	2	0	—		—		26	2
Beroe	2022–23	First League	11	1	—		—		1 (Note: Appearance in First League promotion/relegation play-offs)	0	12	1
Concordia Chiajna	2023–24	Liga II	9	1	—		—		—		9	1
Ceahlăul Piatra Neamț	2024–25	Liga II	6	0	2	0	—		—		8	0
Politehnica Iași	2024–25	Liga I	0	0	1	0	—		—		1	0
FC Bacău	2025–26	Liga II	6	1	—		—		—		6	1
FC Bacău	2026–27	Liga II	10	3	2	0	—		—		12	3
FC Bacău	Total		16	4	2	0	—		—		18	4
Career total			163	23	19	4	1	0	3	0	186	27

== Honours ==
Astra Giurgiu

- Liga I: 2015–16
- Cupa României runner-up: 2016–17, 2018–19
- Supercupa României: 2016

UTA Arad

- Liga II: 2019–20
