= Szilárd Mitra =

Romanian footballer

Personal information
- Date of birth: 9 January 1987 (age 39)
- Place of birth: Viforoasa, Romania
- Height: 1.81 m (5 ft 11 1/2 in)
- Position: Midfielder

Team information
- Current team: Odorheiu Secuiesc (player-manager)
- Number: 5

Senior career*
Years	Team	Apps	(Gls)
2007–2013	Lacul Ursu Mobila Sovata	67	(14)
2013–2014	FC Zagon	27	(3)
2014–2015	SCM Pitești	11	(1)
2015–2017	Sepsi OSK	22	(3)
2018–2020	FK Csíkszereda	4	(0)
2020–	Odorheiu Secuiesc	43	(4)

Managerial career
- 2021: Odorheiu Secuiesc (caretaker)
- 2021–: Odorheiu Secuiesc (assistant)
- * Club domestic league appearances and goals as of 19:22, 14 January 2024 (UTC)

Szilárd Mitra (born 9 January 1987) is a Romanian professional footballer who plays as a midfielder for AFC Odorheiu Secuiesc.

== Honours ==
FK Csíkszereda

- Liga III: 2018–19

Odorheiu Secuiesc

- Liga III: 2021–22
