= Mike Cestor =

Congolese footballer (born 1992)

Personal information
- Full name: Mike Botuli Cestor
- Date of birth: 30 April 1992 (age 34)
- Place of birth: Bagneux, France
- Height: 1.83 m (6 ft 0 in)
- Position: Centre-back

Team information
- Current team: SFC Neuilly
- Number: 92

Youth career
- 2008–2009: Pisa
- 2009–2010: Leyton Orient

Senior career*
Years	Team	Apps	(Gls)
2010–2012	Leyton Orient	3	(0)
2011	→ Boreham Wood (loan)	9	(1)
2011	→ Woking (loan)	7	(0)
2012	→ Woking (loan)	9	(0)
2012–2015	Woking	88	(2)
2016–2018	Épinal	54	(7)
2018–2019	Astra Giurgiu	28	(1)
2019–2022	CFR Cluj	29	(1)
2022–2023	Argeș Pitești	16	(0)
2023–2024	Radomiak Radom	28	(0)
2024–2025	Gloria Buzău	19	(1)
2025	Politehnica Iași	9	(0)
2026	Metaloglobus București	6	(0)
2026–	SFC Neuilly	3	(0)

International career
2013	DR Congo U20	4	(0)
- * Club domestic league appearances and goals as of 19 September 2026

Mike Botuli Cestor (born 30 April 1992) is a professional footballer who plays as a centre-back for Championnat National 2 club SFC Neuilly. Born in France, Cestor has earned caps for DR Congo at under-20 level.

== Club career ==
=== Early career ===
Cestor was born in Bagneux, Hauts-de-Seine, Paris. Before trialling for Leyton Orient, Cestor had been on the books as a youth player for Italian side Pisa.

=== Leyton Orient ===
Cestor joined Orient's youth squad early in the 2009–10 season and also featured in the reserve team before being called up to the first-team squad in December 2009, although he made no first-team appearances. He signed a new two-year contract on 9 June 2010, and he made his professional debut in a League Cup match for Orient, as they won 2–1 at Swindon Town on 10 August 2010. His league debut came three days later in the 3–1 defeat to Charlton Athletic.

On 11 January 2011, Cestor went on a month's loan to Boreham Wood, making his debut on 15 January in the 2–0 win over Chelmsford City.

=== Woking ===
On 19 August 2011, he went on a month's loan to Woking, and made his debut the following day in the 0–0 draw at home to his old club Boreham Wood. He made seven appearances for Woking before returning to Orient and coming on as a substitute in their 3–2 League Cup defeat at Blackburn Rovers on 20 September. He returned to Woking on 12 January 2012 for another month's loan spell, which was later extended, and after a brief return to Orient, he began yet another loan period at Woking. On 15 May 2012, he was one of three players released by Orient manager Russell Slade. On 19 July 2012, Cestor signed permanently for Woking, who were newly promoted to the Football Conference.

On 20 December 2014, in a 2–1 defeat to Southport, Cestor suffered a long term knee injury, therefore ruling him out for the remainder of the 2014–15 campaign.

Ahead of the following campaign, Cestor was released at the end of his contract, due to his slow progress with his injury.

=== Épinal ===
On 2 July 2016, Cestor joined French side SAS Épinal after a year without a club.

== International career ==
Prior to the 2013 Toulon Tournament, Cestor received a call-up for the DR Congo U20 team. Cestor went on to start all four of DR Congo's games in the Toulon campaign, initially making his debut in a 1–0 defeat against the France U20 side on 30 May 2013.

== Career statistics ==
As of match played 19 September 2026

Appearances and goals by club, season and competition
Club	Season	League			National cup (Note: Includes Coupe de France, Cupa României, Polish Cup)		Europe		Other		Total	
Club	Season	Division	Apps	Goals	Apps	Goals	Apps	Goals	Apps	Goals	Apps	Goals
Leyton Orient	2010–11	League One	2	0	0	0	—		3 (Note: One appearance in Football League Trophy, two appearances in EFL Cup)	0	5	0
Leyton Orient	2011–12	League One	1	0	0	0	—		1 (Note: Appearance in EFL Cup)	0	2	0
Leyton Orient	Total		3	0	0	0	—		4	0	7	0
Boreham Wood (loan)	2010–11	Conference South	9	1	0	0	—		0	0	9	1
Woking (loan)	2011–12	Conference South	16	0	—		—		—		16	0
Woking	2012–13	Conference Premier	37	1	1	0	—		1 (Note: Appearance(s) in FA Trophy)	0	39	1
Woking	2013–14	Conference Premier	30	0	—		—		2	0	32	0
Woking	2014–15	Conference Premier	21	1	1	0	—		1	0	23	1
Woking	Total		88	2	2	0	—		4	0	94	2
Épinal	2016–17	Championnat National	26	1	1	1	—		—		27	2
Épinal	2017–18	Championnat National 2 Group B	28	6	2	0	—		—		30	6
Épinal	Total		54	7	3	1	—		—		57	8
Astra Giurgiu	2018–19	Liga I	26	1	6	0	—		—		32	1
CFR Cluj	2019–20	Liga I	11	1	1	0	5 (Note: One appearance in UEFA Champions League, four appearances in UEFA Europa League)	0	—		17	1
CFR Cluj	2020–21	Liga I	6	0	0	0	1 (Note: Appearance in UEFA Champions League)	1	0	0	7	1
CFR Cluj	2021–22	Liga I	12	0	1	0	9 (Note: Five appearances in UEFA Champions League, one appearance in UEFA Europa League, three appearances in UEFA Conference League)	1	0	0	22	1
CFR Cluj	Total		29	1	2	0	15	2	0	0	46	3
Argeș Pitești	2022–23	Liga I	16	0	1	0	—		—		17	0
Radomiak Radom	2022–23	Ekstraklasa	16	0	—		—		—		16	0
Radomiak Radom	2023–24	Ekstraklasa	12	0	1	0	—		—		13	0
Radomiak Radom	Total		28	0	1	0	—		—		29	0
Gloria Buzău	2024–25	Liga I	19	1	—		—		—		19	1
Politehnica Iași	2025–26	Liga II	9	0	—		—		—		9	0
Metaloglobus București	2025–26	Liga I	6	0	1	0	—		—		7	0
SFC Neuilly	2026–27	Championnat National 2	3	0	—		—		—		3	0
Career total			306	13	16	1	15	0	8	2	345	16

== Honours ==
CFR Cluj

- Liga I: 2019–20, 2020–21, 2021–22
- Supercupa României: 2020

Individual

- Liga I Team of the Season: 2018–19
- Liga I Team of the Regular Season: 2018–19
