= Lewis Enoh =

Cameroonian footballer

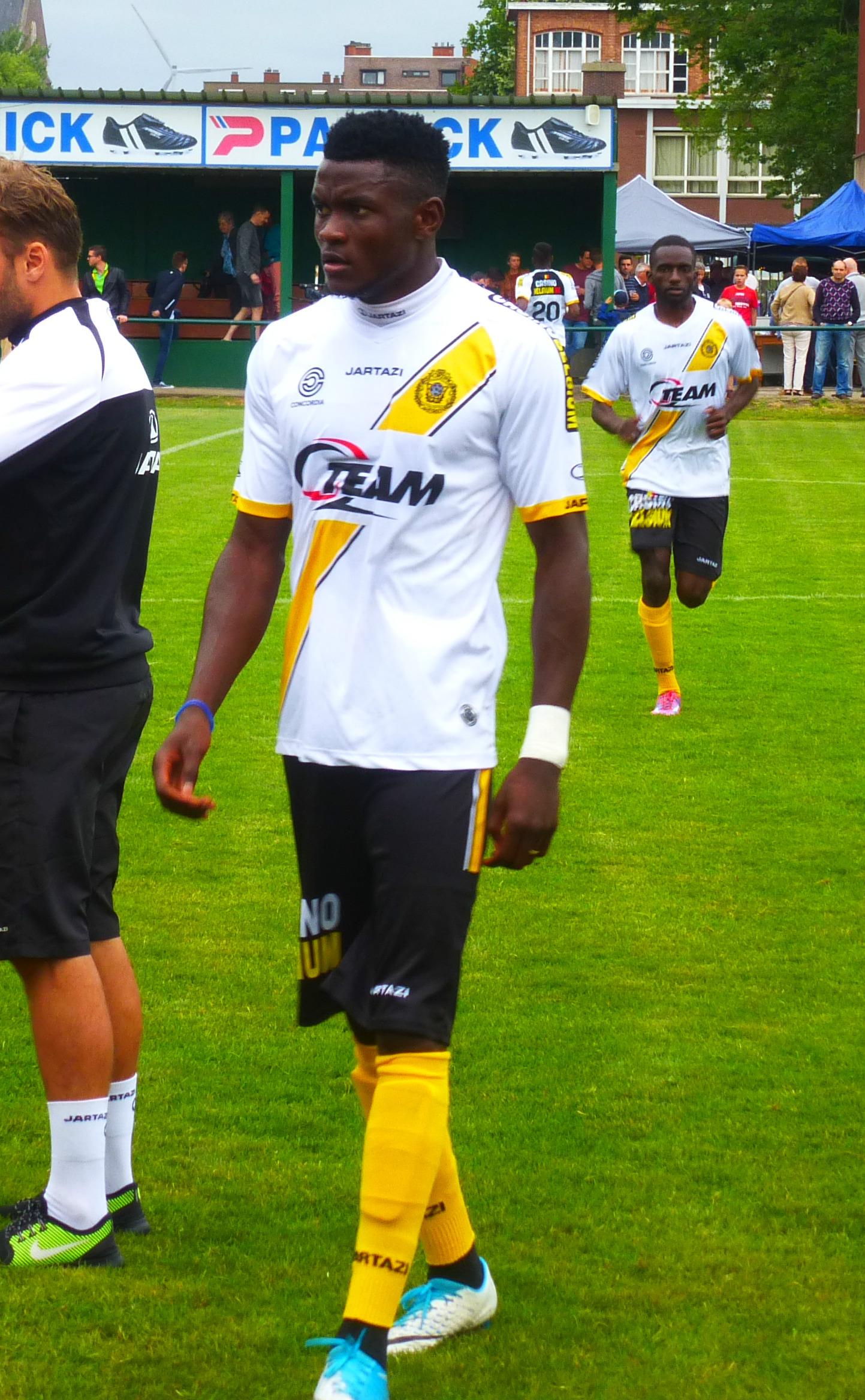
- Enoh in 2017

Personal information
- Full name: Lewis Mbah Enoh
- Date of birth: 23 October 1992 (age 34)
- Place of birth: Bamenda, Cameroon
- Height: 1.89 m (6 ft 2 in)
- Position: Forward

Youth career
- 2011–2013: Alcanenense

Senior career*
Years	Team	Apps	(Gls)
2013–2014	Sourense	14	(10)
2014–2015	Sporting B	32	(3)
2015	→ Leixões (loan)	18	(9)
2015–2018	Lokeren	42	(3)
2018–2019	Politehnica Iași	18	(2)
2019–2020	Leixões	9	(1)
2020	→ Casa Pia (loan)	5	(0)
2020–2021	Sporting Covilhã	31	(4)
2021–2022	PAEEK	28	(1)
2023	Olympiakos Nicosia	9	(1)
- * Club domestic league appearances and goals as of 20 May 2023

Lewis Mbah Enoh (born 23 October 1992) is a Cameroonian professional footballer who played as a forward for Cypriot club Olympiakos Nicosia.

== Club career ==
Enoh started his career with Portuguese Second Division club GD Sourense. He scored 10 goals in 14 matches.

=== Sporting ===
In December 2013, he signed a pre-season contract with Liga de Honra club Sporting B. He signed for a 5-year contract keeping him with the club till 2019 and a buyout clause of £60 million. He made his debut for the club against Trofense in which he received a yellow card.

=== Leixões (loan) ===
On 29 January 2015, he would be loaned to Segunda Liga side Leixões until June. Enoh scored his first goal for Leixões in a 2–3 away defeat to Desportivo das Aves in the Segunda Liga on 22 February.

=== Lokeren ===
In June 2015, Enoh signed with Lokeren, for a transfer fee of €350 thousand.
