= Florin Bejan =

Romanian footballer (born 1991)

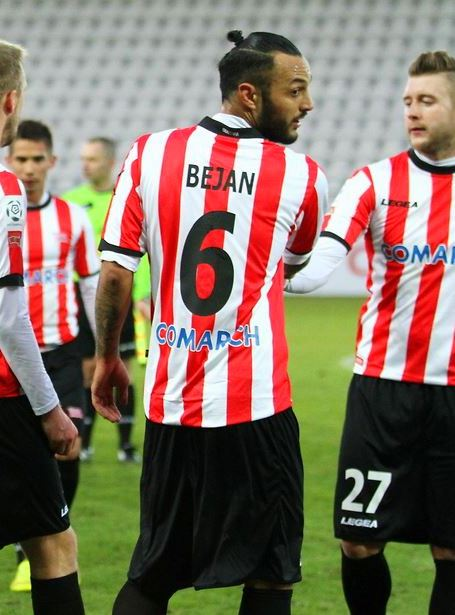
- Bejan (center) playing for Cracovia in 2016

Personal information
- Date of birth: 28 March 1991 (age 35)
- Place of birth: Mangalia, Romania
- Height: 1.86 m (6 ft 1 in)
- Position: Centre-back

Team information
- Current team: Inter Sibiu
- Number: 24

Youth career
- 2001–2007: Aurora 23 August
- 2007–2009: Steaua București

Senior career*
Years	Team	Apps	(Gls)
2009–2011	Steaua II București	48	(1)
2011–2014	Viitorul Constanța	60	(1)
2014–2016	ASA Târgu Mureș	54	(0)
2016–2017	Cracovia	12	(0)
2017	→ Concordia Chiajna (loan)	7	(0)
2017–2019	Astra Giurgiu	56	(1)
2019–2021	Dinamo București	26	(1)
2020	→ Academica Clinceni (loan)	12	(0)
2021–2026	Hermannstadt	116	(4)
2026	ASA Târgu Mureș	7	(0)
2026–	Inter Sibiu	0	(0)

International career
2007–2008	Romania U17	6	(0)
2009–2010	Romania U19	7	(0)
2011–2012	Romania U21	3	(0)
- * Club domestic league appearances and goals as of 9 May 2026

Florin Bejan (born 28 March 1991) is a Romanian professional footballer who plays as a centre-back for Liga III club Inter Sibiu.

== Club career ==
Bejan is a product of Steaua Academy, where he came in 2007. From 2009 until 2011 he played for the 'red-blue' second team. In 2011 he signed for FC Viitorul Constanța and in the winter of 2014 he became the player of ASA Târgu Mureș .

In 2015 he was close to conquer the champion title with ASA Târgu Mureș in a very close fight with FC Steaua București, winning the Romania vice-champion title. For almost two seasons he was one of the best players of his team, until 2016 when he moved to Cracovia, in Poland.

In February 2017 he returned to Liga I on loan, playing for the team coached by Dan Alexa, CS Concordia Chiajna and in the summer he signed with Astra Giurgiu for the next two seasons.

On 19 June 2019, Bejan signed a contract with Dinamo București. He was loaned at Academica Clinceni in February 2020.

== Honours ==
ASA Târgu Mureș

- Supercupa României: 2015

Astra Giurgiu

- Cupa României runner-up: 2018–19

Hermannstadt

- Cupa României runner-up: 2024–25
