= Erico (footballer, born 1989) =

Brazilian footballer

Personal information
- Full name: Erico Constantino da Silva
- Date of birth: 20 July 1989 (age 37)
- Place of birth: Juazeiro, Brazil
- Height: 1.85 m (6 ft 1 in)
- Position: Centre-back

Team information
- Current team: Metaloglobus București
- Number: 75

Youth career
- –2009: Botafogo-SP

Senior career*
Years	Team	Apps	(Gls)
2010	Botafogo-SP	2	(0)
2011	Rio Branco	16	(1)
2012	Palmeiras B	5	(0)
2012	Universitatea Cluj	14	(0)
2013	Guaratinguetá	5	(2)
2013–2017	Pandurii Târgu Jiu	49	(4)
2017–2019	Astra Giurgiu	41	(1)
2019–2020	Sabail	8	(1)
2020–2023	UTA Arad	77	(6)
2023–2026	CSM Reșița	31	(2)
2026–	Metaloglobus București	7	(1)
- * Club domestic league appearances and goals as of 17 October 2026

Erico Constantino da Silva (born 20 July 1989), commonly known as Erico, is a Brazilian professional footballer who plays as centre-back for Liga II club Metaloglobus București.

== Personal life ==
His twin brother Élton is also a footballer, currently playing for Liga III club CSM Târgu Jiu.

== Honours ==
Pandurii Târgu Jiu

- Cupa Ligii runner-up: 2014–15

Astra Giurgiu

- Cupa României runner-up: 2018–19
