= Mihai Butean =

Romanian footballer (born 1996)

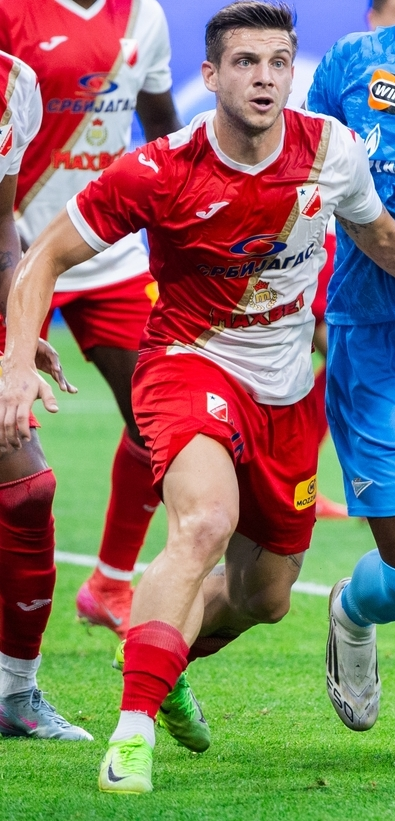
- Butean 2025

Personal information
- Full name: Mihai Ionuț Butean
- Date of birth: 14 September 1996 (age 30)
- Place of birth: Cluj-Napoca, Romania
- Height: 1.81 m (5 ft 11 in)
- Positions: Right-back; midfielder

Team information
- Current team: Vojvodina
- Number: 16

Youth career
- 2005–2015: Universitatea Cluj

Senior career*
Years	Team	Apps	(Gls)
2015–2016	Universitatea Cluj	29	(0)
2016–2019	Astra Giurgiu	39	(2)
2016	→ Academica Clinceni (loan)	14	(1)
2019–2022	CFR Cluj	5	(0)
2020	→ Gaz Metan Mediaș (loan)	11	(0)
2020–2021	→ Gaz Metan Mediaș (loan)	34	(1)
2022	→ Chindia Târgoviște (loan)	17	(1)
2022–2024	Hermannstadt	74	(1)
2024–	Vojvodina	41	(2)

International career
2018–2019	Romania U21	3	(0)
- * Club domestic league appearances and goals as of 29 August 2026

Mihai Ionuț Butean (born 14 September 1996) is a Romanian professional footballer who plays as a right-back or a midfielder for Serbian SuperLiga club Vojvodina.

== Career statistics ==
As of 29 August 2026

Appearances and goals by club, season and competition
Club	Season	League			National cup (Note: Includes Cupa României, Serbian Cup)		Europe		Other		Total	
Club	Season	Division	Apps	Goals	Apps	Goals	Apps	Goals	Apps	Goals	Apps	Goals
Universitatea Cluj	2014–15	Liga I	0	0	–		–		–		0	0
Universitatea Cluj	2015–16	Liga II	29	0	0	0	–		–		29	0
Universitatea Cluj	Total		29	0	0	0	–		–		29	0
Astra Giurgiu	2016–17	Liga I	0	0	0	0	0	0	0	0	0	0
Astra Giurgiu	2017–18	Liga I	15	0	1	0	0	0	–		16	0
Astra Giurgiu	2018–19	Liga I	24	2	6	2	0	0	–		30	4
Astra Giurgiu	Total		39	2	7	2	0	0	0	0	46	4
Academica Clinceni (loan)	2016–17	Liga II	14	1	0	0	–		–		14	1
CFR Cluj	2019–20	Liga I	4	0	1	0	0	0	–		5	0
CFR Cluj	2020–21	Liga I	1	0	0	0	0	0	–		1	0
CFR Cluj	2021–22	Liga I	0	0	1	0	0	0	0	0	1	0
CFR Cluj	Total		5	0	2	0	0	0	0	0	7	0
Gaz Metan Mediaș (loan)	2019–20	Liga I	11	0	0	0	–		–		11	0
Gaz Metan Mediaș (loan)	2020–21	Liga I	34	1	1	1	–		–		35	2
Gaz Metan Mediaș (loan)	Total		45	1	1	1	–		–		46	2
Chindia Târgoviște (loan)	2021–22	Liga I	17	1	0	0	–		0	0	17	1
Hermannstadt	2022–23	Liga I	35	1	4	0	–		–		39	1
Hermannstadt	2023–24	Liga I	39	0	3	0	–		–		42	0
Hermannstadt	Total		74	1	7	0	–		–		81	1
Vojvodina	2024–25	Serbian SuperLiga	29	1	4	0	4 (Note: Two appearances in UEFA Europa League, two appearances in UEFA Conference League)	0	–		37	1
Vojvodina	2025–26	Serbian SuperLiga	10	1	1	0	–		–		11	1
Vojvodina	2026–27	Serbian SuperLiga	2	0	0	0	1 (Note: Appearance in UEFA Conference League)	0	–		3	0
Vojvodina	Total		41	2	5	0	5	0	–		51	2
Career total			264	8	22	3	5	0	0	0	291	11

== Honours ==
Astra Giurgiu

- Cupa României runner-up: 2016–17, 2018–19
- Supercupa României: 2016

CFR Cluj

- Liga I: 2019–20, 2020–21
- Supercupa României runner-up: 2021

Vojvodina

- Serbian Cup runner-up: 2024–25, 2025–26
