= Ciprian Biceanu =

Romanian footballer

Personal information
- Full name: Ionuț Ciprian Biceanu
- Date of birth: 26 February 1994 (age 32)
- Place of birth: Pitești, Romania
- Height: 1.84 m (6 ft 0 in)
- Position: Midfielder

Team information
- Current team: ASA Târgu Mureș
- Number: 8

Youth career
- 2004–2009: Argeș Pitești
- 2009–2010: Școala de Fotbal Nicolae Dobrin
- 2010–2012: Școala de Fotbal Dănuț Coman

Senior career*
Years	Team	Apps	(Gls)
2012–2017	Mioveni	122	(3)
2017–2020	Astra Giurgiu	43	(0)
2020–2022	Concordia Chiajna	40	(2)
2022–2026	Hermannsatdt	127	(1)
2026–	ASA Târgu Mureș	18	(0)
- * Club domestic league appearances and goals as of 31 October 2026

Ionuț Ciprian Biceanu (born 26 February 1994) is a Romanian professional footballer who plays as a midfielder for Liga II club ASA Târgu Mureș.

== Honours ==
Astra Giurgiu

- Cupa României runner-up: 2018–19

Hermannstadt

- Cupa României runner-up: 2024–25
