= David Lazar =

Romanian footballer

Personal information
- Full name: David Beniamin Lazar
- Date of birth: 8 August 1991 (age 35)
- Place of birth: Tileagd, Romania
- Height: 1.84 m (6 ft 0 in)
- Position: Goalkeeper

Team information
- Current team: Sepsi OSK
- Number: 91

Youth career
- Foresta Tileagd
- –2009: Bioland Paleu
- 2009–2010: Voința Sibiu

Senior career*
Years	Team	Apps	(Gls)
2009–2010	Voința Sibiu		
2010–2017	Pandurii Târgu Jiu	36	(0)
2010	→ Voința Sibiu (loan)	15	(0)
2014–2015	→ Botoșani (loan)	22	(0)
2017	Vejle	1	(0)
2017–2021	Astra Giurgiu	79	(0)
2021–2025	Universitatea Craiova	23	(0)
2024–2025	→ Gloria Buzău (loan)	24	(0)
2025–2026	Argeș Pitești	21	(0)
2026	Hermannstadt	14	(0)
2026–	Sepsi OSK	14	(0)

International career
2011–2012	Romania U21	4	(0)
2020	Romania	1	(0)
- * Club domestic league appearances and goals as of 8 November 2026

David Beniamin Lazar (born 8 August 1991) is a Romanian professional footballer who plays as a goalkeeper for Liga I club Sepsi OSK.

== International career ==
In October 2020, he had first called up to the senior side for the play off euro 2020 qualifying against Iceland and nations league against Norway and Austria.

== Career statistics ==
=== Club ===
As of 8 November 2026

Appearances and goals by club, season and competition
Club	Season	League			Cupa României		Europe		Other		Total	
Club	Season	Division	Apps	Goals	Apps	Goals	Apps	Goals	Apps	Goals	Apps	Goals
Voința Sibiu	2009–10	Liga III	?	?	?	?	—		—		?	?
Pandurii Târgu Jiu	2010–11	Liga I	4	0	—		—		—		4	0
Pandurii Târgu Jiu	2011–12	Liga I	6	0	0	0	—		—		6	0
Pandurii Târgu Jiu	2012–13	Liga I	9	0	0	0	—		—		9	0
Pandurii Târgu Jiu	2013–14	Liga I	5	0	2	0	0	0	—		7	0
Pandurii Târgu Jiu	2015–16	Liga I	1	0	1	0	—		0	0	2	0
Pandurii Târgu Jiu	2016–17	Liga I	11	0	0	0	1 (Note: Appearance in UEFA Europa League)	0	0	0	12	0
Pandurii Târgu Jiu	Total		36	0	3	0	1	0	—		40	0
Voința Sibiu (loan)	2010–11	Liga II	15	0	0	0	—		—		15	0
Botoșani (loan)	2013–14	Liga I	12	0	—		—		—		12	0
Botoșani (loan)	2014–15	Liga I	10	0	1	0	—		1 (Note: Appearance in Cupa Ligii)	0	12	0
Botoșani (loan)	Total		22	0	1	0	—		1	0	24	0
Vejle	2016–17	Danish 1st Division	1	0	—		—		—		1	0
Astra Giurgiu	2017–18	Liga I	4	0	1	0	0	0	—		5	0
Astra Giurgiu	2018–19	Liga I	26	0	4	0	—		—		30	0
Astra Giurgiu	2019–20	Liga I	21	0	2	0	—		—		23	0
Astra Giurgiu	2020–21	Liga I	28	0	4	0	—		—		32	0
Astra Giurgiu	Total		79	0	11	0	0	0	—		90	0
Universitatea Craiova	2021–22	Liga I	5	0	3	0	1 (Note: Appearances in UEFA Conference League)	0	0	0	9	0
Universitatea Craiova	2022–23	Liga I	15	0	2	0	6	0	—		23	0
Universitatea Craiova	2023–24	Liga I	3	0	3	0	—		0	0	6	0
Universitatea Craiova	2024–25	Liga I	0	0	—		0	0	—		0	0
Universitatea Craiova	Total		23	0	8	0	7	0	0	0	38	0
Gloria Buzău (loan)	2024–25	Liga I	24	0	—		—		—		24	0
Argeș Pitești	2025–26	Liga I	21	0	0	0	—		—		21	0
Hermannstadt	2025–26	Liga I	13	0	2	0	—		2 (Note: Appearances in Liga I promotion/relegation play-offs)	0	17	0
Sepsi OSK	2026–27	Liga I	14	0	0	0	—		—		14	0
Career total			248	0	25	0	8	0	3	0	284	0

=== International ===
Appearances and goals by national team and year
National team	Year	Apps	Goals
Romania
Romania	2020	1	0
Total		1	0

== Honours ==
Voința Sibiu

- Liga III: 2009–10

Astra Giurgiu

- Cupa României runner-up: 2018–19, 2020–21

Universitatea Craiova

- Supercupa României: 2021
