= Julien Bègue =

French footballer (born 1993)

Personal information
- Full name: Julien-Antoine Bègue
- Date of birth: 8 August 1993 (age 33)
- Place of birth: Saint-Pierre, Réunion, France
- Height: 1.68 m (5 ft 6 in)
- Position: Winger

Team information
- Current team: Louhans-Cuiseaux

Youth career
- –2007: US Tampon
- 2007–2009: Bordeaux
- 2009–2010: Grenoble

Senior career*
Years	Team	Apps	(Gls)
2010–2011	Grenoble B	5	(1)
2011–2016	Guingamp B	55	(20)
2013–2016	Guingamp	4	(0)
2014–2015	→ Boulogne (loan)	28	(7)
2016	→ Bourg-en-Bresse (loan)	16	(3)
2016–2018	Bourg-en-Bresse	58	(11)
2017–2018	→ Bourg-en-Bresse B	1	(0)
2018–2020	Astra Giurgiu	54	(5)
2020–2022	Le Mans	43	(9)
2022–	Louhans-Cuiseaux	4	(2)
- * Club domestic league appearances and goals as of 15:38, 6 November 2022 (UTC)

Julien Bègue (8 August 1993) is a French footballer who plays as a winger for Championnat National 1 side Louhans-Cuiseaux. He previously played in Ligue 1 for Guingamp and in Romania with Astra Giurgiu.

== Honours ==
Astra Giurgiu

- Cupa României: Runner-up 2018–19
