= Paul Costea =

Romanian footballer

Personal information
- Full name: Paul Costeluș Costea
- Date of birth: 2 March 1999 (age 27)
- Place of birth: Cluj-Napoca, Romania
- Height: 1.73 m (5 ft 8 in)
- Position: Midfielder

Youth career
- –2017: Universitatea Cluj
- 2017–2018: Gaz Metan Mediaș

Senior career*
| Years | Team | Apps | (Gls) |
| 2018–2022 | Gaz Metan Mediaș | 39 | (0) |
- * Club domestic league appearances and goals as of 13 May 2022

Paul Costeluș Costea (born 2 March 1999) is a Romanian professional footballer who last played for Gaz Metan Mediaș.
