= Silviu Balaure =

Romanian footballer

Personal information
- Full name: Silviu Nicolae Balaure
- Date of birth: 6 February 1996 (age 30)
- Place of birth: Drobeta-Turnu Severin, Romania
- Height: 1.78 m (5 ft 10 in)
- Positions: Right winger; right back

Team information
- Current team: Argeș Pitești
- Number: 96

Youth career
- –2010: CSȘ Drobeta Turnu Severin
- 2010–2012: Politehnica Timișoara
- 2012–2015: ACS Poli Timișoara

Senior career*
Years	Team	Apps	(Gls)
2013–2015	ACS Poli Timișoara	2	(0)
2015	→ NMM Becicherecu Mic (loan)	10	(3)
2015–2016	FCM Baia Mare	31	(8)
2016–2021	Astra Giurgiu	95	(11)
2021–2026	Hermannstadt	157	(23)
2026–	Argeș Pitești	11	(0)

International career
2012–2013	Romania U17	3	(0)
2014	Romania U19	6	(1)
2015–2017	Romania U21	2	(0)
- * Club domestic league appearances and goals as of 6 November 2026

Silviu Nicolae Balaure (Romanian pronunciation: [ˈsilvju nikoˈla.e baˈla.ure]); born 6 February 1996) is a Romanian professional footballer who plays as right winger or right back for Liga I club Argeș Pitești.

== Club career ==
In May 2016, Balaure signed a contract with first division club Astra Giurgiu.

== Career statistics ==
=== Club ===
As of match played 6 November 2026

Club	Season	League			Cupa României		Europe		Other		Total	
Club	Season	Division	Apps	Goals	Apps	Goals	Apps	Goals	Apps	Goals	Apps	Goals
ACS Poli Timișoara	2013–14	Liga I	2	0	1	0	–		–		3	0
ACS Poli Timișoara	2014–15	Liga II	0	0	0	0	–		–		0	0
ACS Poli Timișoara	Total		2	0	1	0	–		–		3	0
NMM Becicherecu Mic (loan)	2014–15	Liga III	10	3	–		–		–		10	3
FCM Baia Mare	2015–16	Liga II	31	8	2	1	–		–		33	9
Astra Giurgiu	2016–17	Liga I	14	0	1	0	1 (Note: Appearances in UEFA Europa League)	0	0	0	16	0
Astra Giurgiu	2017–18	Liga I	32	8	2	1	4	0	–		38	9
Astra Giurgiu	2018–19	Liga I	18	2	3	0	–		–		21	2
Astra Giurgiu	2019–20	Liga I	6	1	0	0	–		–		6	1
Astra Giurgiu	2020–21	Liga I	25	0	5	1	–		–		30	1
Astra Giurgiu	Total		95	11	11	2	5	0	0	0	111	13
Hermannstadt	2021–22	Liga II	27	8	3	0	–		–		30	8
Hermannstadt	2022–23	Liga I	39	4	2	0	–		–		41	4
Hermannstadt	2023–24	Liga I	39	7	2	1	–		–		41	8
Hermannstadt	2024–25	Liga I	36	4	5	0	–		–		41	4
Hermannstadt	2025–26	Liga I	16	0	0	0	–		2 (Note: Appearances in Liga I promotion/relegation play-offs)	1	18	1
Hermannstadt	Total		157	23	12	1	–		2	1	171	25
Argeș Pitești	2026–27	Liga I	11	0	2	1	–		–		13	1
Career total			306	45	27	5	5	0	2	1	340	51

== Honours ==
Astra Giurgiu

- Cupa României runner-up: 2016–17, 2018–19, 2020–21
- Supercupa României: 2016

Hermannstadt

- Cupa României runner-up: 2024–25
