= Valentin Munteanu =

Romanian footballer

Personal information
- Full name: Valentin Dumitru Munteanu
- Date of birth: 24 October 1989 (age 37)
- Place of birth: Galați, Romania
- Height: 1.75 m (5 ft 9 in)
- Position: Midfielder

Youth career
- –2007: Dunărea Galați

Senior career*
Years	Team	Apps	(Gls)
2007–2012	Dunărea Galați	120	(18)
2012–2014	Fortuna Poiana Câmpina	15	(7)
2015–2016	Pandurii Târgu Jiu	28	(2)
2015	→ Academica Argeș (loan)	11	(2)
2016	→ Farul Constanța (loan)	15	(7)
2017	Concordia Chiajna	17	(3)
2017–2019	Dunărea Călărași	46	(9)
2019–2020	SCM Gloria Buzău	22	(9)
2020–2021	FC U Craiova	19	(2)
2021–2022	CSM Reșița	23	(7)
2022–2023	Gloria Buzău	16	(1)
2023–2024	CSM Deva	10	(0)
Total		342	(67)
- * Club domestic league appearances and goals as of 20:55, 14 January 2024 (UTC)

Valentin Dumitru Munteanu (born 24 October 1989) is a Romanian professional footballer who plays as a midfielder.

== Honours ==
Fortuna Poiana Câmpina

- Liga III: 2013–14

Dunărea Călărași

- Liga II: 2017–18

FC U Craiova 1948

- Liga II: 2020–21

CSM Reșița

- Liga III: 2021–22
