= Bryan Nouvier =

French footballer (born 1995)

Personal information
- Full name: Bryan Jerome Gilbert Nouvier
- Date of birth: 21 June 1995 (age 31)
- Place of birth: Metz, France
- Height: 1.75 m (5 ft 9 in)
- Position: Winger

Team information
- Current team: Swift Hesperange
- Number: 16

Youth career
- –2013: Metz

Senior career*
Years	Team	Apps	(Gls)
2013–2015	Metz B	30	(3)
2015–2019	CFR Cluj	76	(5)
2018–2019	→ Sepsi OSK (loan)	21	(3)
2019–2020	Raków Częstochowa	10	(0)
2020–2021	Sepsi OSK	20	(1)
2021–2022	Jeunesse Esch	22	(6)
2022–	Swift Hesperange	59	(2)
- * Club domestic league appearances and goals as of 14 October 2024

Bryan Jerome Gilbert Nouvier (born 21 June 1995) is a French professional footballer who plays as a midfielder for Swift Hesperange in Luxembourg.

== Club career ==
In August 2015, Nouvier signed a three-year contract with Romanian side CFR Cluj.

== Career statistics ==
=== Club ===
As of match played 12 May 2024

Appearances and goals by club, season and competition
Club	Season	League			National cup (Note: Includes Cupa României, Polish Cup)		League cup (Note: Includes Cupa Ligii)		Europe		Other		Total	
Club	Season	Division	Apps	Goals	Apps	Goals	Apps	Goals	Apps	Goals	Apps	Goals	Apps	Goals
Metz B	2012–13	CFA	1	0	—		—		—		—		1	0
Metz B	2013–14	CFA2	7	0	—		—		—		—		7	0
Metz B	2014–15	CFA	22	3	—		—		—		—		22	3
Metz B	Total		30	3	—		—		—		—		30	3
CFR Cluj	2015–16	Liga I	29	4	5	0	2	0	—		—		36	4
CFR Cluj	2016–17	Liga I	32	0	2	0	2	0	—		1 (Note: Appearance in Supercupa României)	0	37	0
CFR Cluj	2017–18	Liga I	15	1	0	0	—		—		—		15	1
CFR Cluj	Total		76	5	7	0	4	0	—		1	0	88	5
Sepsi OSK (loan)	2018–19	Liga I	21	3	2	1	—		—		—		23	4
Raków Częstochowa	2019–20	Ekstraklasa	10	0	1	0	—		—		—		11	0
Sepsi OSK	2020–21	Liga I	20	1	1	0	—		—		—		21	1
Jeunesse Esch	2021–22	Luxembourg National Division	22	6	1	0	—		—		—		23	6
Swift Hesperange	2022–23	Luxembourg National Division	28	2	1	0	—		—		—		29	2
Swift Hesperange	2023–24	Luxembourg National Division	23	0	5	0	—		4 (Note: Two appearances in UEFA Champions League, two appearances in UEFA Europa Conference League)	0	—		32	0
Swift Hesperange	Total		51	2	6	0	—		4	0	—		61	2
Career total			230	20	18	1	4	0	4	0	1	0	257	21

== Honours ==
CFR Cluj

- Liga I: 2017–18
- Cupa României: 2015–16

Swift Hesperange

- Luxembourg National Division: 2022–23
