= FC Viitorul Constanța =

Association football club in Romania

Viitorul Constanța
- Full name: Fotbal Club Viitorul Constanța
- Nicknames: Puștii lui Hagi (Hagi's Kids); Constănțenii (The People from Constanța)
- Short name: Viitorul
- Founded: 2009; 17 years ago
- Dissolved: 2021 (merged with Farul Constanța)
- Ground: Viitorul
- Capacity: 4,500
- 2020–21: Liga I, 10th of 16
| Home colours | Away colours | Third colours |

Fotbal Club Viitorul Constanța (Romanian pronunciation: [vi.iˈtorul konˈstantsa]), commonly known as Viitorul Constanța or simply Viitorul, was a Romanian professional football club based in Ovidiu, Constanța County. They last played their home matches in blue and black kits at the Stadionul Viitorul, situated a few kilometres north of the city of Constanța.

Founded in 2009 by Gheorghe Hagi, the team was particularly known for promoting young talents from its academy, which earned them the nickname "Hagi's Kids". With the former Romanian international also acting as a coach, Viitorul Constanța had its first major success in the 2016–17 campaign, when it became the first side from the region of Dobruja to win the national title. Two years later, it also won the Romanian Cup and the Romanian Supercup.

In June 2021, owner Gheorghe Hagi, chairman Gheorghe Popescu and Farul Constanța owner Ciprian Marica announced in a press conference that their two clubs have merged; second division club Farul Constanța therefore took Viitorul's berth in the first league from the 2021–22 Liga I season.

== History ==
=== Founding and early years (2009–2012) ===
The first crest used by Viitorul Constanța's senior team.

Viitorul Constanța was founded in the summer of 2009 and enrolled in the Liga III, the third tier of the Romanian football league system, after acquiring the playing rights of CSO Ovidiu. It has been owned since its creation by former Romanian international Gheorghe Hagi.

During the team's first season in Romanian football, they achieved promotion to the 2010–11 Liga II in round 33 after a fierce battle with ACS Berceni towards the end of the campaign. In the 2011–12 Liga II, Viitorul finished second in the standings and were promoted to the top-flight the following season.

=== Domestic trophies and European participations (2012–2021) ===
In the 2012–13 season, Viitorul made its first appearance in Liga I in the club's history. With 8 victories, 12 draws, and 13 defeats, it finished in 13th place with 36 points thereby avoiding relegation. Viitorul had notable victories, but was ever-present in relegation battles for the following two campaigns.

In 2016, Viitorul finished in 5th place, earning a spot in the third qualifying round of the UEFA Europa League. Drawn against Belgian side Gent in their first European match, Viitorul was defeated 0–5 at the Ghelamco Arena.

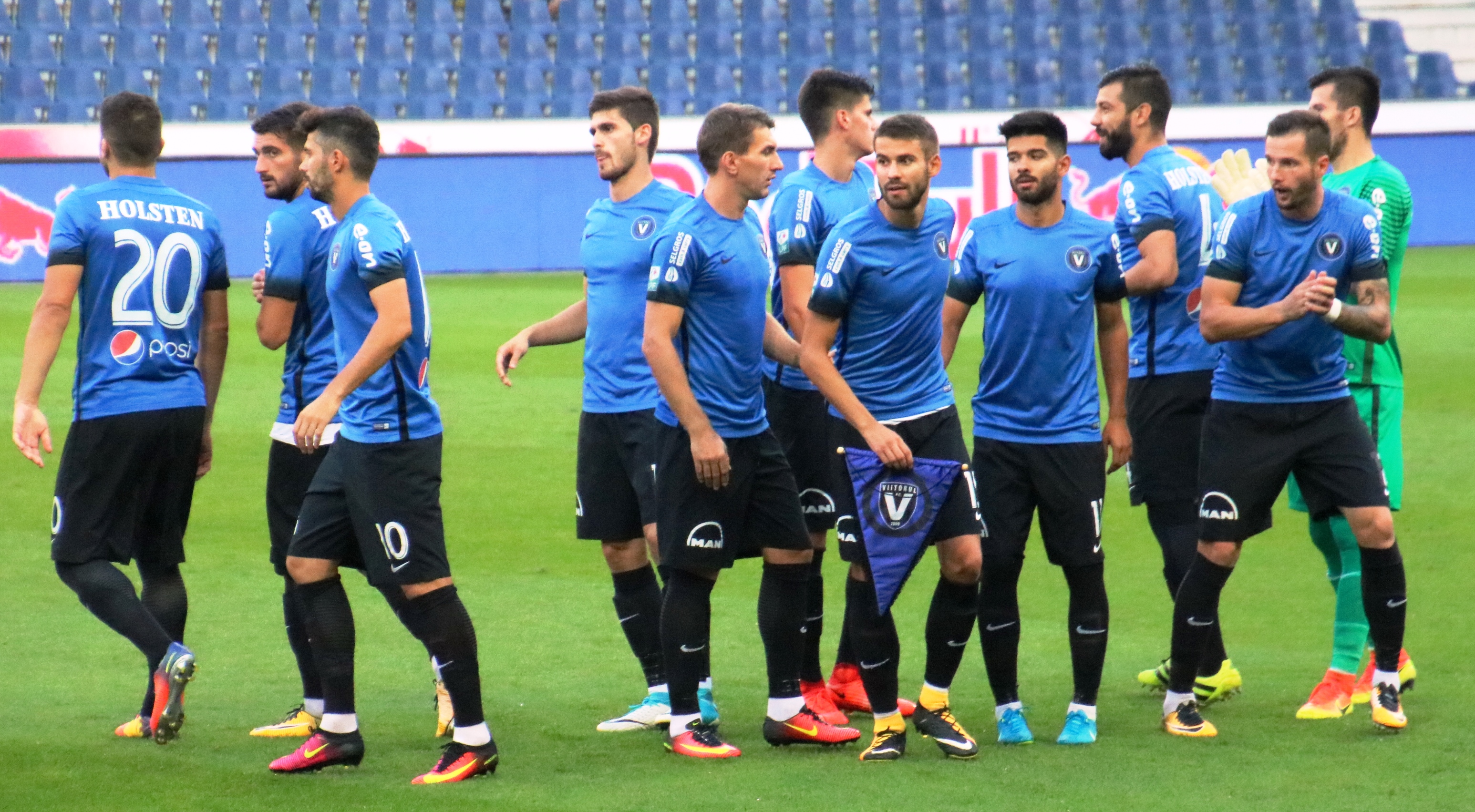
Viitorul players in a UEFA Europa League qualifier against Red Bull Salzburg, August 2017.

On 13 May 2017, Viitorul managed to win the Liga I after a 1–0 home victory over CFR Cluj. It was the first major trophy in the club's history and ensured qualification for the UEFA Champions League. With an average age of 22.2 years, "Hagi's Kids" were the season's youngest league champion in Europe. In the third qualifying round of the Champions League, after a 1–0 win against APOEL at home, Viitorul once again suffered a harsh away defeat (0–4 a.e.t.).

=== Merger with Farul (2021) ===
On 21 June 2021, Gheorghe Hagi, owner and founder of Viitorul, Gheorghe Popescu, chairman of Viitorul, and Ciprian Marica, owner of Farul Constanța, announced in a press conference that their two clubs from Constanța County have merged. Farul took Viitorul's place in the Liga I, while Viitorul virtually disappeared in the process of the merger. With the Farul Stadium in an advanced state of degradation, the new entity moved to the Viitorul Stadium in Ovidiu.

== Youth program ==
Viitorul Constanța was known for developing young players in Romania and having some of the best facilities in the country. The academy was inherited by Farul Constanța following the 2021 merger.

== Grounds ==
Viitorul returned to the newly expanded Stadionul Viitorul in Ovidiu in the summer of 2015, on which it played until the club's disappearance in 2021.

== Honours ==
Note: The merger with Farul Constanța in 2021 and the attribution of Viitorul's honours to Farul are disputed.

=== Leagues ===
- Liga I
  - Winners (1): 2016–17
- Liga II
  - Runners-up (1): 2011–12
- Liga III
  - Winners (1): 2009–10

=== Cups ===
- Cupa României
  - Winners (1): 2018–19
- Supercupa României
  - Winners (1): 2019
  - Runners-up (1): 2017

== Records and statistics ==
=== European Cups history ===
| Season | Competition | Round | Opponent | Home | Away | Aggregate |
|---|---|---|---|---|---|---|
| 2016–17 | UEFA Europa League | 3Q | (Belgium) Gent | 0–0 | 0–5 | 0–5 |
| 2017–18 | UEFA Champions League | 3Q | (Cyprus) APOEL | 1–0 | 0–4 (a.e.t.) | 1–4 |
| 2017–18 | UEFA Europa League | PO | (Austria) Red Bull Salzburg | 1–3 | 0–4 | 1–7 |
| 2018–19 | UEFA Europa League | 1Q | (Luxembourg) Racing FC | 0–0 | 2–0 | 2–0 |
| 2018–19 | UEFA Europa League | 2Q | (Netherlands) Vitesse Arnhem | 2–2 | 1–3 | 3–5 |
| 2019–20 | UEFA Europa League | 2Q | (Belgium) Gent | 2–1 | 3–6 | 5–7 |

Notes

- 1Q: First qualifying round
- 2Q: Second qualifying round
- 3Q: Third qualifying round
- PO: Play-off round

=== European cups all-time statistics ===
As of 1 August 2019

| Competition | S | P | W | D | L | GF | GA | GD |
|---|---|---|---|---|---|---|---|---|
| UEFA Europa League | 4 | 10 | 2 | 3 | 5 | 11 | 24 | −13 |
| UEFA Champions League | 1 | 2 | 1 | 0 | 1 | 1 | 4 | −3 |
| Total | 5 | 12 | 3 | 3 | 6 | 12 | 28 | −16 |

=== League history ===
| Season | Tier | Division | Place | Notes | Cupa României |
|---|---|---|---|---|---|
| 2020–21 | 1 | Liga I | 10th | Dissolved | Round of 32 |
| 2019–20 | 1 | Liga I | 7th | | Round of 32 |
| 2018–19 | 1 | Liga I | 3rd | | Winners |
| 2017–18 | 1 | Liga I | 4th | | Round of 16 |
| 2016–17 | 1 | Liga I | 1st (C) | Champions | Quarter-finals |
| 2015–16 | 1 | Liga I | 5th | | Quarter-finals |

| Season | Tier | Division | Place | Notes | Cupa României |
|---|---|---|---|---|---|
| 2014–15 | 1 | Liga I | 11th | | Round of 16 |
| 2013–14 | 1 | Liga I | 12th | | Quarter-finals |
| 2012–13 | 1 | Liga I | 13th | | Round of 32 |
| 2011–12 | 2 | Liga II (Seria I) | 2nd (P) | Promoted | Round of 32 |
| 2010–11 | 2 | Liga II (Seria I) | 8th | | Round of 32 |
| 2009–10 | 3 | Liga III (Seria II) | 1st (C, P) | Promoted | |
