= 2018–19 Cupa României =

Cupa României 2018–19
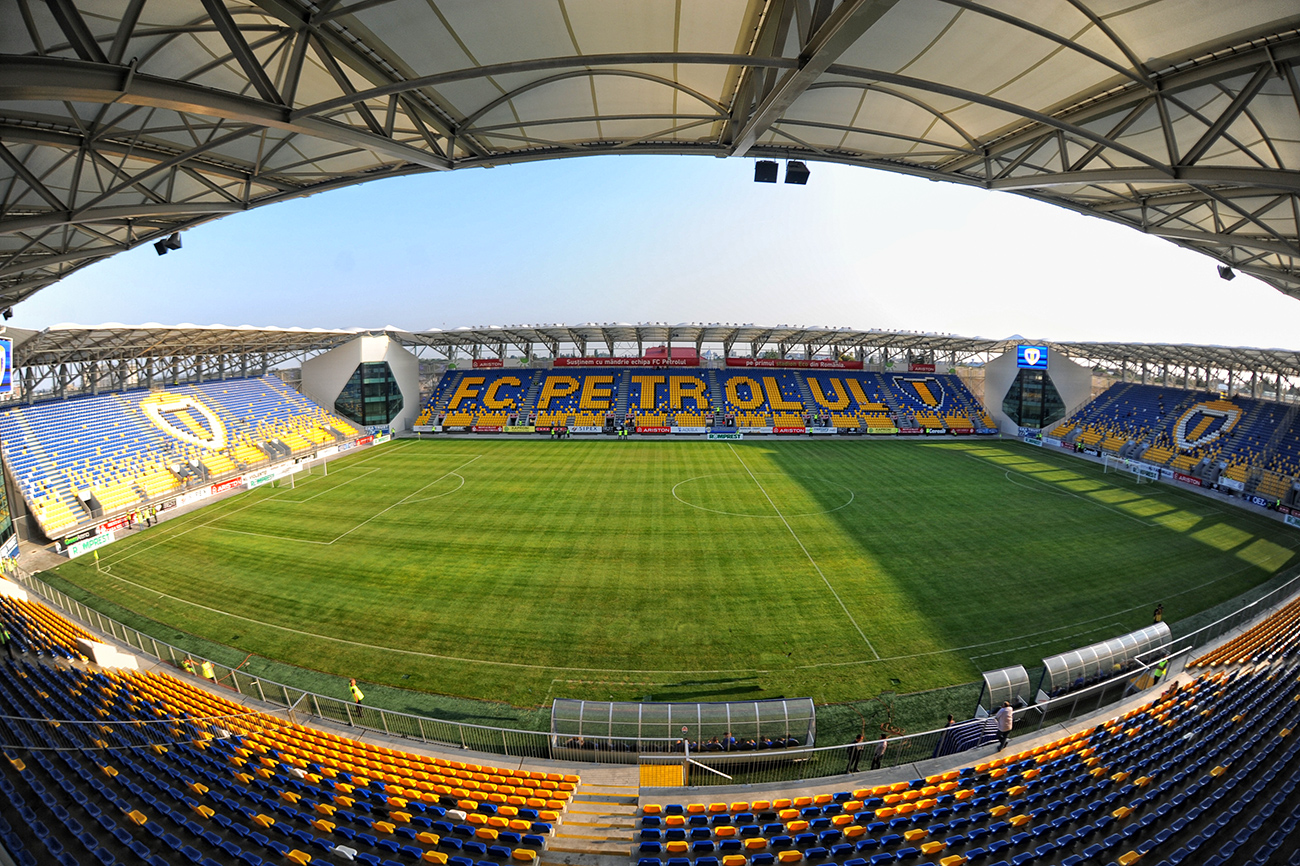

Tournament details
- Country: Romania
- Teams: 133

Final positions
- Champions: Viitorul Constanța
- Runners-up: Astra Giurgiu

The 2018–19 Cupa României was the 81st season of the annual Romanian primary football knockout tournament. As winners, Viitorul Constanța, qualified for the second qualifying round of the 2019–20 UEFA Europa League.

Times up to 27 October 2018 and from 31 March 2019 were EEST (UTC+3). Times from 28 October 2018 to 30 March 2019 were EET (UTC+2).

== Participating clubs ==
The following 133 teams qualified for the competition:

| 2017–18 Liga I all clubs (14) | 2017–18 Liga II; Without dissolved clubs (18) | 2017–18 Liga III; Without second teams and some dissolved clubs (59) |
| CFR Cluj; FCSB; Universitatea Craiova; Viitorul Constanța; Astra Giurgiu; CSM Politehnica Iași; Dinamo București; Botoșani; Sepsi OSK; Gaz Metan Mediaș; Concordia Chiajna; Voluntari; Poli Timișoara; Daco-Getica București | Dunărea Călărași; Hermannstadt; Chindia Târgoviște; Argeș Pitești; Afumați; Academica Clinceni; ASU Politehnica Timișoara; Luceafărul Oradea; Mioveni; Sportul Snagov; Ripensia Timișoara; UTA Arad; Balotești; Pandurii Târgu Jiu; Dacia Unirea Brăila; Metaloglobus București; Știința Miroslava; Foresta Suceava | Aerostar Bacău; Farul Constanța; Petrolul Ploiești; Șirineasa; Universitatea Cluj; Miercurea Ciuc; Progresul Spartac București; Alexandria; CSMȘ Reșița; Comuna Recea; Oțelul Galați; Unirea Slobozia; Turris-Oltul Turnu Măgurele; Național Sebiș; Performanța Ighiu; Roman; Axiopolis Cernavodă; Lugoj; Metalurgistul Cugir; Bucovina Rădăuți; Metalul Buzău; Popești-Leordeni; Industria Galda; Olimpic Cetate Râșnov; Flacăra Moreni; Șoimii Lipova; Unirea Alba Iulia; Hărman; Tunari; Filiași; Sănătatea Cluj; Sporting Liești; Înainte Modelu; Atletic Bradu; Cetate Deva; KSE Târgu Secuiesc; Râmnicu Sărat; Ghiroda; Unirea Tășnad; Focșani; Oltenița; Pucioasa; Gloria Lunca Teuz Cermei; Avântul Reghin; Odorheiu Secuiesc; Agricola Borcea; Avrig; Millenium Giarmata; Sporting Roșiori; Sănătatea Darabani; Sportul Chiscani; Pașcani; Delta Dobrogea Tulcea; Viitorul Domnești; Internațional Bălești; Iernut; Victoria Traian; Nuova Mama Mia Becicherecu Mic; Unirea Dej |
42 representatives of regional associations^{1}
| Sportul Petrești (Alba); Victoria Zăbrani (Arad); Unirea Bascov (Argeș); Viitorul Curița (Bacău); Dacia Gepiu (Bihor); 1. FC Gloria (Bistrița-Năsăud); Viitorul Albești (Botoșani); Precizia Săcele (Brașov); Viitorul Ianca (Brăila); Rapid București (Bucharest); Voința Lanurile (Buzău); Croația Clocotici (Caraș-Severin); Mostiștea Ulmu (Călărași); Sticla Arieșul Turda (Cluj) | Mihail Kogălniceanu (Constanța); Nemere Ghelința (Covasna); Gloria Cornești (Dâmbovița); FC U Craiova (Dolj); Universitatea Galați (Galați); Argeșul Mihăilești (Giurgiu); Petrolul Țicleni (Gorj); Unirea Cristuru Secuiesc (Harghita); Hunedoara (Hunedoara); Viitorul Axintele (Ialomița); Unirea Mircești (Iași); Bragadiru (Ilfov); Minaur Baia Mare (Maramureș); Viitorul Șimian (Mehedinți) | Mureșul Rușii-Munți (Mureș); Ceahlăul Piatra Neamț (Neamț); Slatina (Olt); Păulești (Prahova); Crasna Moftinu Mic (Satu Mare); Rapid Jibou (Sălaj); Viitorul Șelimbăr (Sibiu); Viitorul Liteni (Suceava); Drăgănești-Vlașca (Teleorman); Fortuna Becicherecu Mic (Timiș); Pescărușul Sarichioi (Tulcea); Vulturești (Vaslui); Cozia Călimănești (Vâlcea); Sportul Ciorăști (Vrancea) |

== Preliminary rounds ==
The first rounds, and any preliminaries, are organised by the Regional Leagues.

== First round ==
All matches were played on 1 and 2 August 2018.

| Team 1 | Score | Team 2 |
|---|---|---|
1 August 2018
| Viitorul Albești (4) | w/o | Sănătatea Darabani (3) |
| Viitorul Liteni (4) | 3–0 | Pașcani (3) |
| Viitorul Curița (4) | 0–2 | Ceahlăul Piatra Neamț (3) |
| Vulturești (4) | 0–5 | Unirea Mircești (4) |
| Sportul Ciorăști (4) | 1–7 | Focșani (3) |
| Universitatea Galați (4) | 2–1 | Sportul Chiscani (3) |
| Viitorul Ianca (4) | 0–1 | Victoria Traian (4) |
| Pescărușul Sarichioi (4) | 3–1 | Delta Dobrogea Tulcea (3) |
| Mihail Kogălniceanu (4) | 1–3 | Agricola Borcea (3) |
| Mostiștea Ulmu (4) | 2–2 (a.e.t.) (5–6 p) | Oltenița (3) |
| Viitorul Axintele (4) | 1–3 | Înainte Modelu (3) |
| Rapid București (3) | 3–0 | Viitorul Domnești (3) |
| Argeșul Mihăilești (4) | 0–3 | Bragadiru (3) |
| Drăgănești-Vlașca (4) | 1–3 | Sporting Roșiori (3) |
| Gloria Cornești (4) | 2–1 | Pucioasa (3) |
| FC U Craiova (3) | w/o | Internațional Bălești (4) |
| Petrolul Țicleni (4) | 1–0 | Viitorul Șimian (4) |
| Slatina (4) | 3–2 | Cozia Călimănești (4) |
| Croația Clocotici (4) | w/o | Nuova Mama Mia Becicherecu Mic (4) |
| Victoria Zăbrani (4) | 2–0 | Millenium Giarmata (3) |
| Dacia Gepiu (4) | 0–5 | Gloria Lunca Teuz Cermei (3) |
| Sportul Petrești (4) | 3–1 | Hunedoara (3) |
| Viitorul Șelimbăr (4) | 0–2 (a.e.t.) | Avrig (3) |
| Sticla Arieșul Turda (3) | 4–2 | Iernut (3) |
| Crasna Moftinu Mic (4) | w/o | Unirea Tășnad (3) |
| Rapid Jibou (4) | 0–2 | Minaur Baia Mare (3) |
| 1. FC Gloria (3) | 2–1 | Unirea Dej (3) |
| Mureșul Rușii-Munți (4) | 1–5 | Avântul Reghin (3) |
| Nemere Ghelința (4) | 1–4 | KSE Târgu Secuiesc (3) |
| Unirea Cristuru Secuiesc (4) | 4–3 (a.e.t.) | Odorheiu Secuiesc (3) |
| Precizia Săcele (4) | 1–1 (a.e.t.) (4–3 p) | Păulești (4) |
2 August 2018
| Voința Lanurile (4) | 1–8 | Râmnicu Sărat (3) |
| Unirea Bascov (3) | 2–1 | Atletic Bradu (3) |
| Fortuna Becicherecu Mic (4) | 1–4 | Ghiroda (3) |

== Second round ==
All matches were played on 14, 15 and 16 August 2018.

| Team 1 | Score | Team 2 |
|---|---|---|
14 August 2018
| Croația Clocotici (4) | 1–5 | Ghiroda (3) |
15 August 2018
| Sănătatea Darabani (3) | 0–1 | Bucovina Rădăuți (3) |
| Industria Galda (3) | w/o | Performanța Ighiu (4) |
| Sportul Petrești (4) | 0–3 | Metalurgistul Cugir (3) |
| Avrig (3) | 0–1 | Unirea Alba Iulia (3) |
| Victoria Zăbrani (4) | 1–2 | Șoimii Lipova (3) |
| Gloria Lunca Teuz Cermei (3) | 2–0 | Național Sebiș (3) |
| Cetate Deva (3) | 1–2 | Lugoj (3) |
| Petrolul Țicleni (4) | 1–3 | Filiași (3) |
| Slatina (4) | 2–0 | FC U Craiova (3) |
| Unirea Bascov (3) | 1–2 | Sporting Roșiori (3) |
| Gloria Cornești (4) | w/o | Flacăra Moreni (3) |
| Sticla Arieșul Turda (3) | 1–3 | Sănătatea Cluj (3) |
| Minaur Baia Mare (3) | 3–1 | Unirea Tășnad (3) |
| Viitorul Liteni (4) | 2–1 | Roman (3) |
| Unirea Mircești (4) | 0–5 | Ceahlăul Piatra Neamț (3) |
| Universitatea Galați (4) | 1–3 | Sporting Liești (3) |
| Pescărușul Sarichioi (4) | 0–6 | Oțelul Galați (3) |
| Înainte Modelu (3) | 2–5 | Axiopolis Cernavodă (3) |
| Agricola Borcea (3) | 2–9 | Oltenița (3) |
| Victoria Traian (4) | 1–4 (a.e.t.) | Unirea Slobozia (3) |
| Râmnicu Sărat (3) | 1–3 | Metalul Buzău (3) |
| Focșani (3) | 3–0 | KSE Târgu Secuiesc (3) |
| Precizia Săcele (4) | 0–2 | Olimpic Cetate Râșnov (3) |
| Unirea Cristuru Secuiesc (4) | 1–7 | Hărman (3) |
| 1. FC Gloria (3) | w/o | Avântul Reghin (3) |
| Rapid București (3) | 5–0 | Bragadiru (3) |
16 August 2018
| Tunari (3) | 3–0 | Popești-Leordeni (3) |

== Third round ==
All matches were played on 28 and 29 August 2018.

| Team 1 | Score | Team 2 |
|---|---|---|
28 August 2018
| Focșani (3) | 5–2 | Metalul Buzău (3) |
| Progresul Spartac București (3) | 2–1 | Afumați (3) |
| Sporting Roșiori (3) | 0–3 (a.e.t.) | Turris-Oltul Turnu Măgurele (3) |
| Slatina (4) | 0–0 (a.e.t.) (12–11 p) | Filiași (3) |
| Flacăra Moreni (3) | 0–0 (a.e.t.) (6–5 p) | Olimpic Cetate Râșnov (3) |
| Hărman (3) | 0–2 | Miercurea Ciuc (3) |
| Minaur Baia Mare (3) | 0–1 | Comuna Recea (3) |
| Unirea Alba Iulia (3) | 1–0 | Sănătatea Cluj (3) |
| Industria Galda (3) | 3–2 | Metalurgistul Cugir (3) |
| Ghiroda (3) | 0–0 (a.e.t.) (3–4 p) | Lugoj (3) |
29 August 2018
| Bucovina Rădăuți (3) | 1–0 | Foresta Suceava (3) |
| Viitorul Liteni (4) | 0–4 | Știința Miroslava (3) |
| Ceahlăul Piatra Neamț (3) | 1–4 | Aerostar Bacău (2) |
| Sporting Liești (3) | 0–0 (a.e.t.) (8–7 p) | Oțelul Galați (3) |
| Oltenița (3) | 2–3 | Unirea Slobozia (3) |
| Axiopolis Cernavodă (3) | 3–2 | Farul Constanța (2) |
| 1. FC Gloria (3) | 1–2 | Universitatea Cluj (2) |
| Tunari (3) | 2–1 | Petrolul Ploiești (2) |
| CSMȘ Reșița (3) | 0–2 | Energeticianul (2) |
| Gloria Lunca-Teuz Cermei (3) | 2–1 | Șoimii Lipova (3) |
| Rapid București (3) | 4–1 | Alexandria (3) |

== Fourth round ==
The matches were played between 11 and 13 September 2018. The game between Flacăra Moreni and Chindia Târgoviște was played on the 18th because it clashed with a rescheduled league match of Chindia.

| Team 1 | Score | Team 2 |
|---|---|---|
11 September 2018
| Focșani (3) | 0–3 (a.e.t.) | Sporting Liești (3) |
| Tunari (3) | 0–2 | Academica Clinceni (2) |
| Gloria Lunca-Teuz Cermei (3) | 1–4 | Luceafărul Oradea (2) |
| Unirea Alba Iulia (3) | 2–2 (a.e.t.) (5–3 p) | Industria Galda (3) |
| Turris-Oltul Turnu Măgurele (3) | 3–2 | Balotești (2) |
| Rapid București (3) | 2–1 | Daco-Getica București (2) |
12 September 2018
| Pandurii Târgu Jiu (2) | 1–3 | Mioveni (2) |
| Lugoj (3) | 1–2 | Energeticianul (2) |
| UTA Arad (2) | 2–1 | ACS Poli Timișoara (2) |
| Slatina (4) | 2–0 | Argeș Pitești (2) |
| Progresul Spartac București (3) | 2–0 | Metaloglobus București (2) |
| Unirea Slobozia (3) | 2–3 | Sportul Snagov (2) |
| Axiopolis Cernavodă (3) | 2–2 (a.e.t.) (1–4 p) | Dacia Unirea Brăila (2) |
| Bucovina Rădăuți (3) | 2–0 (a.e.t.) | Știința Miroslava (3) |
| Ripensia Timișoara (2) | 1–2 (a.e.t.) | ASU Politehnica Timișoara (2) |
13 September 2018
| Miercurea Ciuc (3) | 3–2 | Aerostar Bacău (2) |
| Comuna Recea (3) | 1–3 | Universitatea Cluj (2) |
18 September 2018
| Flacăra Moreni (3) | 1–2 | Chindia Târgoviște (2) |

== Round of 32 ==
The matches were played on 25, 26 and 27 September 2018.

| 25 September 2018 | Voluntari (1) | 2–1 | Botoșani (1) | Voluntari |
| 16:00 EEST (UTC+3) | Belahmeur 38'; Tudorie 41' | Report | Chitoșcă 46' | Stadium: Anghel Iordănescu; Attendance: 100; Referee: Andrei Antonie (Bucharest) |

| 25 September 2018 | Miercurea Ciuc (3) | 2–1 | Energeticianul (2) | Miercurea Ciuc |
| 16:30 EEST (UTC+3) | Mitra 31'; Magyari 73' | Report | V. Rusu 71' | Stadium: Municipal; Attendance: 600; Referee: Marian Barbu (Făgăraș) |

| 25 September 2018 | Sportul Snagov (2) | 0–2 | Universitatea Craiova (1) | Craiova |
| 18:45 EEST (UTC+3) | | Report | Gardoș 36'; Marković 74' | Stadium: Ion Oblemenco; Attendance: 10,000; Referee: Horia Mladinovici (Bucharest) |

| 25 September 2018 | ASU Politehnica Timișoara (2) | 1–1 (a.e.t.) (2–4 p) | Sepsi OSK (1) | Timișoara |
| 19:00 EEST (UTC+3) | Ignea 43' | Report | Prosser 17' | Stadium: Dan Păltinișanu; Attendance: 1,000; Referee: Marian Balaci (Turnu Severin) |
| | Penalties |
| | Bănică (penalty scored); Coadă (penalty missed); Bozian (penalty scored); Cojocaru (penalty missed) | | Hadnagy (penalty scored); Nouvier (penalty scored); A. Rus (penalty scored); Drăghici (penalty scored) |

| 25 September 2018 | Dacia Unirea Brăila (2) | 1–3 | Dinamo București (1) | Galați |
| 21:30 EEST (UTC+3) | Maxin 21' | Report | Grigore 6'; Nistor 8', 71' | Stadium: Oțelul; Attendance: 2,500; Referee: Florin Andrei (Târgu Mureș) |

| 26 September 2018 | UTA Arad (2) | 3–3 (a.e.t.) (3–5 p) | Politehnica Iași (1) | Arad |
| 16:00 EEST (UTC+3) | C. Rus 3'; Cr. Matei 67'; Al. Pop 116' (pen.) | Report | Bekui 45+2'; Aguinaldo 82'; Enoh 97' (pen.) | Stadium: Motorul; Attendance: 2,500; Referee: Robert Dumitru (Sfântu Gheorghe) |
| | Penalties |
| | Manea (penalty scored); Cubleșan (penalty scored); D. Popa (penalty scored); Al. Pop (penalty missed) | | Cioinac (penalty scored); Enoh (penalty scored); L. Rus (penalty scored); Al.Zaharia (penalty scored); Gallego (penalty scored) |

| 26 September 2018 | Sporting Liești (3) | 0–3 | Mioveni (2) | Liești |
| 16:30 EEST (UTC+3) | | Report | Al. Neagu 39'; Balint 62' (pen.); Rădescu 89' | Stadium: Comunal; Attendance: 700; Referee: Bogdan Dumitrache (Bucharest) |

| 26 September 2018 | Slatina (4) | 0–2 | Dunărea Călărași (1) | Slatina |
| 16:30 EEST (UTC+3) | | Report | V. Alexandru 7'; Dobrosavlevici 29' | Stadium: 1 Mai; Attendance: 4,000; Referee: Mihai Amorăriței (Câmpina) |

| 26 September 2018 | Progresul Spartac București (3) | 0–1 | Universitatea Cluj (2) | Bucharest |
| 16:30 EEST (UTC+3) | | Report | Giurgiu 34' (pen.) | Stadium: Progresul Spartac; Attendance: 400; Referee: Robert Avram (Pitești) |

| 26 September 2018 | Academica Clinceni (2) | 0–2 | Hermannstadt (1) | Clinceni |
| 16:30 EEST (UTC+3) | | Report | Tsoumou 53'; Petrescu 66' | Stadium: Clinceni; Attendance: 400; Referee: Eduard Ioniță (Galați) |

| 26 September 2018 | Concordia Chiajna (1) | 0–3 | Viitorul Constanța (1) | Chiajna |
| 18:45 EEST (UTC+3) | | Report | Ghiță 14'; Leca 65' (o.g.); A. Ciobanu 90+3' | Stadium: Concordia; Attendance: 500; Referee: George Găman (Craiova) |

| 26 September 2018 | Chindia Târgoviște (2) | 0–1 | CFR Cluj (1) | Mioveni |
| 21:30 EEST (UTC+3) | | Report | Tambe 33' | Stadium: Orășenesc; Attendance: 1,000; Referee: Adrian Cojocaru (Galați) |

| 27 September 2018 | Luceafărul Oradea (2) | 1–5 | Astra Giurgiu (1) | Sânmartin |
| 16:00 EEST (UTC+3) | V. Pop 79' | Report | Bègue 64'; Zoua 66'; V. Gheorghe 70', 80', 90' | Stadium: Luceafărul; Attendance: 1,200; Referee: Lucian Rusandu (Sfântu Gheorghe) |

| 27 September 2018 | Bucovina Rădăuți (3) | 1–1 (a.e.t.) (7–8 p) | Gaz Metan Mediaș (1) | Rădăuți |
| 16:30 EEST (UTC+3) | Vițu 83' | Report | Yazalde 90+2' | Stadium: Municipal; Attendance: 2,000; Referee: Rareș Vidican (Satu Mare) |
| | Penalties |
| | Cerlincă (penalty missed); Vișinar (penalty scored); Stănescu (penalty scored); Dănilă (penalty scored); Bălan (penalty scored); Bosînceanu (penalty scored); Coroamă (penalty scored); Antonesei (penalty scored); Vițu (penalty missed) | | Trif (penalty scored); Ivanov (penalty missed); Yazalde (penalty scored); Chamed (penalty scored); Al. Buziuc (penalty scored); M. Stancu (penalty scored); P. Costea (penalty scored); B. Fofana (penalty scored); Jica (penalty scored) |

| 27 September 2018 | Rapid București (3) | 0–2 | Turris-Oltul Turnu Măgurele (3) | Bucharest |
| 18:45 EEST (UTC+3) | | Report | Dragu 75'; Mihai 90' | Stadium: Giulești-Valentin Stănescu; Attendance: 3,500; Referee: Adrian Costreie (Buftea) |

| 27 September 2018 | Unirea Alba Iulia (3) | 0–1 | FCSB (1) | Zlatna |
| 21:30 EEST (UTC+3) | | Report | Rusescu 85' | Stadium: Minaur; Attendance: 3,000; Referee: Adrian Comănescu (Rm. Vâlcea) |

== Round of 16 ==
The matches were played on 30, 31 October and 1 November 2018.

| 30 October 2018 | Hermannstadt (1) | 3–0 | Voluntari (1) | Târgu Mureș |
| 16:30 EET (UTC+2) | Nkololo 38'; Petrescu 51' (pen.); Kuca 90' | Report | | Stadium: Trans-Sil; Attendance: 100; Referee: Ionuț Coza (Cernica) |

| 30 October 2018 | Turris-Oltul Turnu Măgurele (3) | 1–4 | Universitatea Craiova (1) | Turnu Măgurele |
| 19:00 EET (UTC+2) | Fotescu 33' | Report | Donkor 49'; Bancu 51'; Burlacu 79'; Cicâldău 88' | Stadium: Municipal; Attendance: 2,000; Referee: Eduard Ioniță (Galați) |

| 30 October 2018 | Politehnica Iași (1) | 2–2 (a.e.t.) (3–5 p) | Viitorul Constanța (1) | Iași |
| 21:45 EET (UTC+2) | Sanoh 55'; Frăsinescu 75' | Report | I.Hagi 16' (pen.); Mățan 38' | Stadium: Emil Alexandrescu; Attendance: 1,500; Referee: Marcel Bîrsan (Bucharest) |
| | Penalties |
| | Platini (penalty scored); Qaka (penalty scored); Bădic (penalty scored); N'Dongala (penalty missed) | | I.Hagi (penalty scored); A.Ciobanu (penalty scored); V.Achim (penalty scored); Casap (penalty scored); Houri (penalty scored) |

| 31 October 2018 | Mioveni (2) | 0–5 | Sepsi OSK (1) | Mioveni |
| 16:30 EET (UTC+2) | | Report | Prosser 4'; Fl.Ștefan 13'; Simonovski 25'; Nouvier 45'; A.Rus 64' | Stadium: Orășenesc; Attendance: 1,500; Referee: Iulian Dima (Bucharest) |

| 31 October 2018 | Universitatea Cluj (2) | 3–4 (a.e.t.) | Astra Giurgiu (1) | Cluj-Napoca |
| 19:00 EET (UTC+2) | Abrudan 2'; Taub 5', 8' | Report | Llullaku 14' (pen.), 75'; Cordoș 24' (o.g.); Sepsi 99' (o.g.) | Stadium: Cluj Arena; Attendance: 6,800; Referee: Horia Mladinovici (Bucharest) |

| 31 October 2018 | Gaz Metan Mediaș (1) | 0–1 | CFR Cluj (1) | Mediaș |
| 21:45 EET (UTC+2) | | Report | Țucudean 65' | Stadium: Gaz Metan; Attendance: 1,500; Referee: Marius Avram (Bucharest) |

| 1 November 2018 | Miercurea Ciuc (3) | 3–3 (a.e.t.) (6–5 p) | Dinamo București (1) | Miercurea Ciuc |
| 19:00 EET (UTC+2) | Majzik 48'; Magyari 52'; Berde 114' | Report | Nistor 54', 60'; Neicuțescu 110' | Stadium: Municipal; Attendance: 2,000; Referee: Andrei Antonie (Bucharest) |
| | Penalties |
| | Eder (penalty missed); Jebari (penalty scored); Vereș (penalty missed); Majzik (penalty scored); Bajkó (penalty scored); Guarú (penalty scored); Berde (penalty scored); Mitra (penalty missed); Solymosy (penalty missed); Nagy (penalty scored) | | Nistor (penalty scored); Salomão (penalty scored); Hanca (penalty missed); Katsikas (penalty scored); Grozav (penalty missed); Neicuțescu (penalty scored); Grigore (penalty scored); Olteanu (penalty missed); D.Ciobotariu (penalty missed); Delorge (penalty missed) |

| 1 November 2018 | Dunărea Călărași (1) | 2–1 | FCSB (1) | Călărași |
| 21:45 EET (UTC+2) | Șeroni 47'; Dobrosavlevici 80' | Report | C.Dumitru 82' | Stadium: Ion Comșa; Attendance: 8,200; Referee: Sebastian Colțescu (Craiova) |

== Quarter-finals ==
The matches were played on 26, 27 and 28 February 2019.

| 26 February 2019 | Hermannstadt (1) | 2–3 | Viitorul Constanța (1) | Pitești |
| 20:00 EET (UTC+2) | V.Achim 63' (o.g.); Tsoumou 72' (pen.) | Report | V.Achim 6' (pen.); Rivaldinho 41'; Eric 77' | Stadium: Nicolae Dobrin; Attendance: 100; Referee: Horațiu Feșnic (Cluj-Napoca) |

| 27 February 2019 | Dunărea Călărași (1) | 1–2 | Astra Giurgiu (1) | Giurgiu |
| 17:00 EET (UTC+2) | V.Munteanu 89' | Report | Hambo 5', 7' | Stadium: Marin Anastasovici; Attendance: 600; Referee: Cătălin Popa (Pitești) |

| 27 February 2019 | Sepsi OSK (1) | 0–1 | CFR Cluj (1) | Sfântu Gheorghe |
| 20:00 EET (UTC+2) | | Report | Costache 60' | Stadium: Municipal; Attendance: 2,500; Referee: George Găman (Craiova) |

| 28 February 2019 | Miercurea Ciuc (3) | 0–3 | Universitatea Craiova (1) | Miercurea Ciuc |
| 20:00 EET (UTC+2) | | Report | Dimitrov 27'; Bărbuț 80'; Koljić 90+2' | Stadium: Municipal; Attendance: 2,000; Referee: Iulian Dima (Bucharest) |

== Semi-finals ==
The semi-final matches are played in a round-trip system. The first legs were played on 3 and 4 April 2019 and the second legs were played on 24 and 25 April 2019.

| Team 1 | Agg. | Team 2 | 1st leg | 2nd leg |
|---|---|---|---|---|
| CFR Cluj (1) | 3–5 | Astra Giurgiu (1) | 1–3 | 2–2 |
| Universitatea Craiova (1) | 1–4 | Viitorul Constanța (1) | 1–2 | 0–2 |

=== 1st leg ===
| 3 April 2019 | CFR Cluj (1) | 1–3 | Astra Giurgiu (1) | Cluj-Napoca |
| 20:00 EEST (UTC+3) | Bud 15' | Report | V.Gheorghe 4'; Bègue 35'; Butean 52' | Stadium: Dr. Constantin Rădulescu; Attendance: 2,500; Referee: Andrei Chivulete (Bucharest) |

| 4 April 2019 | Universitatea Craiova (1) | 1–2 | Viitorul Constanța (1) | Craiova |
| 20:00 EEST (UTC+3) | Bancu 5' | Report | Houri 77'; Rivaldinho 89' | Stadium: Ion Oblemenco; Attendance: 8,000; Referee: Horațiu Feșnic (Cluj-Napoca) |

=== 2nd leg ===
| 24 April 2019 | Astra Giurgiu (1) | 2–2 | CFR Cluj (1) | Giurgiu |
| 19:45 EEST (UTC+3) | Butean 34'; Alibec 37' (pen.) | Report | Costache 42', 66' | Stadium: Marin Anastasovici; Attendance: 1,000; Referee: Marcel Bîrsan (Bucharest) |

| 25 April 2019 | Viitorul Constanța (1) | 2–0 | Universitatea Craiova (1) | Ovidiu |
| 19:45 EEST (UTC+3) | I.Hagi 6', 86' | Report | | Stadium: Viitorul; Attendance: 4,000; Referee: Radu Petrescu (Bucharest) |

== Final ==
| 25 May 2019 | Astra Giurgiu (1) | 1–2 (a.e.t.) | Viitorul Constanța (1) | Ploiești |
| 20:00 EEST (UTC+3) | Alibec 41' | Report | Ghiță 76'; Eric 105+2' | Stadium: Ilie Oană; Attendance: 11,968; Referee: Radu Petrescu (Bucharest) |

Cupa României 2018–19 winners

1st title
