= List of Romanian football transfers winter 2019–20 =

This is a list of Romanian football transfers for the 2019–20 winter transfer window. Only moves featuring 2019–20 Liga I and 2019–20 Liga II are listed.

== Liga I ==
=== Academica Clinceni ===
In:

No.	Pos.	Nation	Player
—	DF	ROU	Cristian Albu (on loan from Concordia Chiajna)
—	DF	ROU	Florin Bejan (on loan from Dinamo București)
—	DF	ESP	David Bollo (from (Bulgaria) Slavia Sofia)
—	DF	GRE	Giannis Kontoes (on loan from CFR Cluj)
—	MF	COD	Aristote N'Dongala (from (Bulgaria) Cherno More)
—	MF	SVK	Denis Ventúra (from (Slovakia) Sereď)
—	FW	ROU	Jovan Marković (on loan from Universitatea Craiova)
—	FW	TUN	Sofien Moussa (from Botoșani)

Out:

No.	Pos.	Nation	Player
—	FW	ROU	Cristian Dumitru (loan return to FCSB)
—	DF	GRE	Okan Chatziterzoglou (to CSM Reșița)
—	DF	ROU	Andrei Răuță (to Petrolul Ploiești)
—	MF	ROU	Bogdan Barbu (to Universitatea Cluj)
—	MF	ROU	Laurențiu Buș (to CSM Reșița)
—	MF	BRA	Jean Deretti (to Free agent)
—	MF	ROU	Vasile Olariu (to Free agent)
—	MF	NED	Oulad Omar (to (Georgia (country)) Locomotive Tbilisi)
—	FW	FRA	Philippe Nsiah (to (Vietnam) Đà Nẵng)

=== Astra Giurgiu ===
In:

No.	Pos.	Nation	Player
—	GK	ROU	Mirel Bolboașă (from UTA Arad)
—	MF	ROU	Alexandru Ioniță (on loan from CFR Cluj)
—	MF	JPN	Takayuki Seto (from (Latvia) RFS)
—	FW	ROU	Raoul Baicu (from Universitatea Craiova)
—	FW	NGR	Kehinde Fatai (from (Belarus) Dinamo Minsk)

Out:

No.	Pos.	Nation	Player
—	GK	ROU	Mihai Popa (on loan to Rapid București)
—	DF	ROU	Paul Copaci (to Rapid București)
—	DF	ROU	Radu Crișan (on loan to UTA Arad, previously on loan at Dunărea Călărași)
—	MF	MDA	Gheorghe Andronic (to (Belarus) Rukh Brest)
—	MF	ROU	Gabriel Enache (to (Kazakhstan) Kyzylzhar)
—	MF	ROU	Florentin Matei (to (Cyprus) Apollon Limassol)
—	MF	POR	Toni Silva (to (Kazakhstan) Taraz)
—	MF	MDA	Victor Stînă (to Free agent, previously on loan at (Moldova) Milsami Orhei)
—	FW	FRA	Oumare Tounkara (to Free agent)
—	FW	USA	Danny Barbir (to (United States) Sporting Kansas City II)

=== Botoșani ===
In:

No.	Pos.	Nation	Player
—	DF	ROU	Alin Șeroni (from UTA Arad)
—	MF	MKD	David Babunski (from (Japan) Omiya Ardija)
—	MF	BEL	Alessio Carlone (from Politehnica Iași)
—	MF	ALB	Realdo Fili (from (Albania) Luftëtari)
—	FW	CRO	Marko Dugandžić (from (Croatia) Osijek)

Out:

No.	Pos.	Nation	Player
—	DF	LAT	Ņikita Koļesovs (loan return to (Latvia) Ventspils)
—	DF	ROU	Aleksandru Longher (to Politehnica Iași)
—	DF	ROU	Bogdan Melinte (on loan to Bucovina Rădăuți)
—	DF	ROU	George Miron (to FCSB)
—	MF	ROU	Răzvan Andronic (to CFR Cluj)
—	MF	ROU	Alexandru Corban (to Aerostar Bacău)
—	MF	ROU	Dragoș Penescu (on loan to Universitatea Cluj)
—	MF	ARG	Leonel Pierce (to Petrolul Ploiești)
—	MF	ROU	Alexandru Piftor (on loan to Chindia Târgoviște)
—	FW	TUN	Sofien Moussa (to Academica Clinceni)
—	FW	FRA	Hervin Ongenda (to (Italy) Chievo)

=== CFR Cluj ===
In:

No.	Pos.	Nation	Player
—	GK	ROU	Ionuț Rus (loan return from Turris Turnu Măgurele)
—	GK	POL	Grzegorz Sandomierski (from (Poland) Jagiellonia Białystok)
—	DF	ROU	Denis Ciobotariu (from Dinamo București)
—	DF	ROU	Cristian Manea (on loan from (Cyprus) Apollon Limassol, previously on loan at FCSB)
—	MF	ROU	Răzvan Andronic (from Botoșani)
—	MF	ROU	Alexandru Chipciu (from (Belgium) Anderlecht)
—	MF	ROU	Cristian Paleoca (from Sticla Arieșul Turda)

Out:

No.	Pos.	Nation	Player
—	GK	ESP	Jesús Fernández (on loan to (Greece) Panetolikos)
—	GK	ROU	Adrian Rus (to Free agent)
—	GK	ROU	Cosmin Vâtcă (to Free agent)
—	DF	ROU	Mihai Butean (on loan to Gaz Metan Mediaș)
—	DF	ROU	Răzvan Horj (to Universitatea Cluj)
—	DF	ROU	Rareș Ispas (on loan to CSM Reșița)
—	DF	GRE	Giannis Kontoes (on loan to Academica Clinceni)
—	DF	ROU	Andrei Mureșan (to Universitatea Cluj)
—	DF	ROU	Alex Pașcanu (on loan to Voluntari)
—	DF	ROU	Andrei Peteleu (to (Moldova) Sheriff Tiraspol)
—	MF	ARG	Emmanuel Culio (to (Argentina) Quilmes)
—	MF	ROU	Sebastian Mailat (on loan to Universitatea Cluj, previously on loan to Gaz Metan Mediaș)
—	MF	ROU	Adrian Pop (on loan to Unirea Dej)
—	FW	CMR	Robert Tambe (to (China) Shaanxi Chang'an Athletic, previously on loan at (Moldova) Sheriff Tiraspol)

=== Chindia Târgoviște ===
In:

No.	Pos.	Nation	Player
—	DF	ROU	Alex Negrea (from Free agent)
—	DF	FRA	Bradley Diallo (from Politehnica Iași)
—	MF	ROU	Alexandru Piftor (on loan from Botoșani)
—	FW	SWE	Valmir Berisha (from (Bosnia and Herzegovina) Velež Mostar)
—	FW	ROU	Cătălin Barbu (from Argeș Pitești)

Out:

No.	Pos.	Nation	Player
—	DF	ROU	Alin Dudea (loan return to Dinamo București, later on loan at CSM Reșița)
—	DF	ROU	Robert Neciu (loan return to Viitorul Constanța, later on loan at Universitatea Cluj)
—	FW	ROU	Andrei Burlacu (loan return to Universitatea Craiova, later on loan at Concordia Chiajna)
—	FW	ROU	Andrei Dumiter (loan return to Sepsi Sfântu Gheorghe)
—	DF	ROU	Mihai Leca (to Argeș Pitești)
—	FW	ROU	Mihai Voduț (to Free agent)

=== Dinamo București ===
In:

No.	Pos.	Nation	Player
—	DF	ROU	Radu Zamfir (loan return from Daco-Getica București)
—	DF	ROU	Szabolcs Kilyén (on loan from Viitorul Constanța, previously on loan at Sepsi Sfântu Gheorghe)
—	DF	SVK	Kristián Koštrna (from (Slovakia) DAC Dunajská Streda)
—	DF	SVK	Lukáš Skovajsa (from (Slovakia) Trenčín)
—	MF	ROU	Valentin Lazăr (from (Turkey) Ümraniyespor)

Out:

No.	Pos.	Nation	Player
—	GK	ROU	Dragoș Petrișor (on loan to Turris Turnu Măgurele, previously on loan to Tunari)
—	GK	ROU	Dragoș Trașcă (on loan to Focșani, previously on loan to Mostiștea Ulmu)
—	DF	MRI	Kévin Bru (to Free agent)
—	DF	ROU	Denis Ciobotariu (to CFR Cluj)
—	DF	ROU	Alin Dudea (on loan to CSM Reșița, previously on loan to Chindia Târgoviște)
—	DF	FRA	Damien Dussaut (to Viitorul Constanța)
—	DF	LTU	Linas Klimavičius (to Politehnica Iași)
—	DF	BRA	Gabriel Moura (to Gaz Metan Mediaș)
—	DF	ROU	Ekrem Oltay (to Afumați)
—	DF	ROU	Vlad Olteanu (to Free agent, previously on loan to Concordia Chiajna)
—	MF	CPV	Brito (to (Portugal) Académica de Coimbra)
—	MF	ROU	Laurențiu Corbu (to Chindia Târgoviște)
—	MF	ROU	Alin Lazăr (on loan to Focșani, previously on loan to CSM Reșița)
—	MF	ROU	Liviu Gheorghe (on loan to Înainte Modelu, previously on loan to Daco-Getica București)
—	MF	ROU	Dan Nistor (to Universitatea Craiova)
—	MF	ROU	Roberto Strechie (to (Italy) Novara)
—	FW	ROU	Cătălin Măgureanu (on loan to Afumați, previously on loan to Dunărea Călărași)
—	FW	CRO	Ivan Pešić (to (Kazakhstan) Kaisar, previously on loan at (Kazakhstan) Shakhter Karagandy)
—	FW	ROU	Gabriel Răducan (on loan to Oțelul Galați, previously on loan at CSM Reșița)

=== FCSB ===
In:

No.	Pos.	Nation	Player
—	FW	ROU	Cristian Dumitru (loan return from Academica Clinceni)
—	DF	ROU	George Miron (from Botoșani)
—	MF	ROU	Darius Olaru (from Gaz Metan Mediaș)
—	FW	ROU	Adrian Petre (from (Denmark) Esbjerg fB)
—	DF	ROU	Cristian Tand (from Ardealul Cluj-Napoca Football Academy)

Out:

No.	Pos.	Nation	Player
—	DF	BUL	Bozhidar Chorbadzhiyski (loan return to (Bulgaria) CSKA Sofia)
—	DF	ROU	Cristian Manea (loan return to (Cyprus) Apollon Limassol, later on loan to CFR Cluj)
—	GK	ROU	Ștefan Târnovanu (on loan to Politehnica Iași, previously bought)
—	DF	ROU	Claudiu Belu (on loan to Voluntari)
—	MF	POR	Thierry Moutinho (to (Spain) Córdoba)
—	MF	ROU	Mihai Pintilii (Retired)
—	MF	POR	Diogo Salomão (to (Portugal) Santa Clara)
—	FW	POL	Łukasz Gikiewicz (to (Jordan) Al-Faisaly)
—	FW	ROU	Ioan Hora (to Gaz Metan Mediaș)
—	FW	CGO	Juvhel Tsoumou (to (China) Shenyang Urban)

=== Gaz Metan Mediaș ===
In:

No.	Pos.	Nation	Player
—	DF	ROU	Alexandru Socaci (loan return from Daco-Getica București)
—	DF	ROU	Mihai Butean (on loan from CFR Cluj)
—	DF	BRA	Gabriel Moura (from Dinamo București)
—	DF	DEN	Thomas Juel-Nielsen (from Free agent)
—	FW	ROU	Ioan Hora (from FCSB)

Out:

No.	Pos.	Nation	Player
—	DF	MKD	Mite Cikarski (to (North Macedonia) Akademija Pandev)
—	DF	ROU	Bogdan Jica (on loan to Dunărea Călărași, previously on loan to Daco-Getica București)
—	MF	ROU	Raul Hăjmășam (on loan to Minaur Baia Mare, previously on loan to Viitorul Târgu Jiu)
—	MF	ROU	Darius Olaru (to FCSB)
—	MF	NED	Moussa Sanoh (on loan to Voluntari)

=== Hermannstadt ===
In:

No.	Pos.	Nation	Player
—	DF	CPV	Tiago Almeida (from (Portugal) Académico de Viseu)
—	DF	ROU	Alin Dobrosavlevici (from Concordia Chiajna)
—	FW	ROU	Adrian Bălan (from Politehnica Iași)

Out:

No.	Pos.	Nation	Player
—	DF	ROU	Paul Oșan (on loan to Minaur Baia Mare)
—	DF	ROU	Claudiu Pamfile (to Minaur Baia Mare)
—	DF	ROU	Sergiu Popovici (to ASU Politehnica Timișoara)
—	DF	ROU	Alexandru Străulea (to Măgura Cisnădie)
—	MF	ROU	Gheorghe Morariu (to Free agent)
—	MF	ROU	Paul Hodea (to Free agent)
—	MF	ROU	Loren Niță (on loan to Viitorul Șelimbăr)
—	FW	AUT	Daniel Offenbacher (to (Lithuania) Sūduva)
—	FW	ITA	Mattia Persano (to (Italy) Rieti)
—	FW	CRO	Stjepan Plazonja (on loan to Viitorul Șelimbăr)

=== Politehnica Iași ===
In:

No.	Pos.	Nation	Player
—	GK	ROU	Teodor Axinte (loan return from Aerostar Bacău)
—	FW	ROU	Alexandru Zaharia (loan return from Ozana Târgu Neamț)
—	GK	ROU	Ștefan Târnovanu (on loan from FCSB, previously sold)
—	DF	MLI	Fomba Bourama (on loan from Ceahlăul Piatra Neamț)
—	DF	LTU	Linas Klimavičius (from Dinamo București)
—	DF	ROU	Aleksandru Longher (from Botoșani)
—	DF	ROU	Sorin Șerban (on loan from FCSB)
—	MF	ROU	Răzvan Grădinaru (from Concordia Chiajna)
—	MF	ARG	Manuel de Iriondo (from (Argentina) Unión Santa Fe)
—	MF	NGR	Michael Omoh (from (Sweden) Mjällby)
—	FW	ARG	Lucas Chacana (from (Argentina) Deportivo Morón)
—	FW	CAF	Habib Habibou (from (Belgium) Lokeren)
—	FW	NED	Kevin Luckassen (from Free agent)

Out:

No.	Pos.	Nation	Player
—	GK	ROU	Alberto Cobrea (to CSM Reșița)
—	GK	USA	Jacob Samnik (to (Denmark) Hobro)
—	DF	ROU	Bogdan Balint (on loan to Aerostar Bacău)
—	DF	FRA	Bradley Diallo (to Chindia Târgoviște)
—	DF	ESP	Adrià Gallego (to Free agent)
—	DF	ROU	Ștefan Rusu (on loan to Ozana Târgu Neamț)
—	MF	ROU	Mihai Armeanu (on loan to Pașcani)
—	MF	ROU	Cosmin Bîrnoi (to Viitorul Constanța)
—	MF	BEL	Alessio Carlone (to Botoșani)
—	MF	ROU	Marius Chelaru (to Aerostar Bacău)
—	MF	ESP	Didac Devesa (to (Cyprus) Ermis Aradippou)
—	MF	ROU	Denis Iftimie (on loan to Ozana Târgu Neamț, previously on loan to Pașcani)
—	MF	KOS	Florian Loshaj (to (Poland) Cracovia)
—	FW	ROU	Adrian Bălan (to Hermannstadt)
—	FW	ROU	Iuliu Hațiegan (to Free agent)
—	FW	UGA	Luwagga Kizito (to (Israel) Hapoel Kfar Saba, previously on loan at (Kazakhstan) Shakhter Karagandy)
—	FW	ROU	Andrei Tănasă (to FCSB II)

=== Sepsi Sfântu Gheorghe ===
In:

No.	Pos.	Nation	Player
—	FW	ROU	Andrei Dumiter (loan return from Chindia Târgoviște)
—	GK	ROU	Cătălin Căpățână (from Viitorul Sfântu Gheorghe)
—	DF	ROU	Daniel Celea (from Mioveni)
—	DF	ROU	Balázs Csiszér (from Miercurea Ciuc)
—	MF	ROU	George Dragomir (from Făurei)
—	MF	ROU	Lóránd Fülöp (on loan from (Hungary) Puskás Akadémia)
—	MF	ROU	Lóránt Kovács (from (Hungary) Újpest)
—	FW	NED	Anass Achahbar (from (Netherlands) Dordrecht)
—	FW	ARG	Tomás Díaz (from (Argentina) Barracas Central)

Out:

No.	Pos.	Nation	Player
—	DF	ROU	Szabolcs Kilyén (loan return to Viitorul Constanța, later on loan to Dinamo București)
—	GK	ROU	Horațiu Moldovan (to Ripensia Timișoara)
—	DF	SEN	Oumar Diakhite (to (Portugal) Aves)
—	DF	CGO	Hugo Konongo (to Free agent)
—	MF	NED	Hilal Ben Moussa (to (Netherlands) Emmen)
—	MF	CRC	Dylan Flores (to (Costa Rica) Alajuelense)
—	MF	SDN	Yasin Hamed (on loan to Miercurea Ciuc)
—	MF	ROU	Claudiu Vereș (on loan to Dunărea Călărași, previously transferred from Național Sebiș)

=== Universitatea Craiova ===
In:

No.	Pos.	Nation	Player
—	FW	ROU	Alexandru Popescu (loan return from Academica Clinceni)
—	MF	ROU	Dan Nistor (from Dinamo București)
—	DF	FRA	Claude Dielna (from (United States) Portland Timbers)
—	FW	BRA	Gustavo Vagenin (from (China) Liaoning F.C.)

Out:

No.	Pos.	Nation	Player
—	DF	ROU	Florin Borța (on loan to Concordia Chiajna)
—	DF	ROU	Raul Hreniuc (on loan to Mioveni)
—	DF	CRO	Renato Kelić (to (Croatia) Cibalia)
—	MF	BIH	Goran Zakarić (to (Bosnia and Herzegovina) Borac Banja Luka, previously signed from Free agent)
—	FW	ROU	Raoul Baicu (to Astra Giurgiu)
—	FW	ROU	Andrei Burlacu (on loan to Concordia Chiajna, previously on loan at Chindia Târgoviște)
—	FW	POR	Carlos Fortes (on loan to (Morocco) Ittihad Tanger)
—	FW	ROU	Jovan Marković (on loan to Academica Clinceni)

=== Viitorul Constanța ===
In:

No.	Pos.	Nation	Player
—	GK	ROU	Árpád Tordai (loan return from Universitatea Cluj)
—	MF	ROU	Giani Gherghiceanu (loan return from Focșani)
—	DF	FRA	Damien Dussaut (from Dinamo București)
—	DF	ROU	Cristian Ganea (on loan from (Spain) Athletic Bilbao)
—	MF	ROU	Cosmin Bîrnoi (from Politehnica Iași)
—	MF	FRA	Malcom Edjouma (from (France) Lorient, previously on loan at (France) Chambly)
—	FW	ROU	Aurelian Chițu (from (South Korea) Daejeon Citizen)
—	FW	CMR	Jacques Zoua (from Free agent)

Out:

No.	Pos.	Nation	Player
—	GK	ROU	Valentin Cojocaru (on loan to Voluntari)
—	DF	ROU	Steliano Filip (to (Greece) AEL)
—	DF	ROU	Szabolcs Kilyén (on loan to Dinamo București, previously on loan at Sepsi Sfântu Gheorghe)
—	DF	ROU	Marius Leca (on loan to Farul Constanța)
—	DF	ROU	Robert Neciu (on loan to Universitatea Cluj, previously on loan at Chindia Târgoviște)
—	DF	ROU	Răzvan Prodan (to Mostiștea Ulmu, previously on loan to Daco-Getica București)
—	DF	ROU	Bogdan Țîru (to (Poland) Jagiellonia Białystok)
—	MF	ROU	Andreias Calcan (to (Hungary) Újpest)
—	MF	BRA	Eric (to Voluntari)
—	MF	FRA	Lyes Houri (to (Hungary) Fehérvár)
—	MF	ROU	Andreas Iani (on loan to Progresul Spartac București, previously on loan to Daco-Getica București)
—	MF	ROU	Andrei Tîrcoveanu (on loan to Concordia Chiajna)
—	FW	ROU	Remus Mihai (on loan to Afumați)

=== Voluntari ===
In:

No.	Pos.	Nation	Player
—	GK	ROU	Valentin Cojocaru (on loan from Viitorul Constanța)
—	DF	ROU	Claudiu Belu (on loan from FCSB)
—	DF	ROU	Alex Pașcanu (on loan from CFR Cluj)
—	MF	BRA	Eric (from Viitorul Constanța)
—	MF	ESP	Pablo de Lucas (from (Greece) Xanthi)
—	MF	NED	Moussa Sanoh (on loan from Gaz Metan Mediaș)
—	FW	ROU	Vlad Morar (from (Greece) Panetolikos)

Out:

No.	Pos.	Nation	Player
—	GK	ROU	Alexandru Neacșu (on loan to Viitorul Șelimbăr)
—	DF	ESP	Julio (to (Bulgaria) Tsarsko Selo)
—	DF	ROU	Constantin Nica (to (Serbia) Vojvodina)
—	MF	GEO	Avtandil Ebralidze (to (Portugal) Leixões)
—	MF	VEN	Franco Signorelli (to (Italy) Vibonese)
—	FW	AUT	Martin Harrer (to (Austria) Grazer AK)
—	FW	GRE	Thanasis Papazoglou (to (Greece) AEL)

== Liga II ==
=== Argeș Pitești ===
In:

No.	Pos.	Nation	Player
—	MF	ROU	Adrian Ungur (loan return from Filiași)
—	GK	ROU	George Micle (on loan from FCSB II, previously on loan at Sportul Snagov)
—	DF	FRA	Sylvain Deslandes (from (England) Wolverhampton)
—	DF	ROU	Mihai Leca (from Chindia Târgoviște)
—	MF	ROU	Andrei Mirică (from Sportul Snagov)
—	MF	ROU	Ovidiu Rasoveanu (from Pandurii Târgu Jiu)
—	FW	BIH	Nedo Turković (from Turris Turnu Măgurele)

Out:

No.	Pos.	Nation	Player
—	DF	ROU	Robert Dănescu (to Gilortul Târgu Cărbunești)
—	MF	ROU	Angelo Cocian (on loan to Unirea Dej, previously on loan to Crișul Chișineu-Criș)
—	MF	ROU	Paul Szecui (to Minaur Baia Mare)
—	FW	ROU	Marius Alexe (to Free agent)
—	FW	ROU	Cătălin Barbu (to Chindia Târgoviște)

=== ASU Politehnica Timișoara ===
In:

No.	Pos.	Nation	Player
—	DF	ROU	Sergiu Popovici (from Hermannstadt)
—	MF	ROU	Dorin Codrea (on loan from ACS Poli Timișoara)
—	MF	ROU	Alexandru Munteanu (from Petrolul Ploiești)
—	MF	ROU	Dragoș Săulescu (from CSM Reșița)
—	MF	ROU	Nicolae Șofran (on loan from Ghiroda)
—	FW	ROU	Alexandru Pop (from Viitorul Târgu Jiu)

Out:

No.	Pos.	Nation	Player
—	MF	ROU	Vlad Bâte (on loan to Ghiroda)
—	MF	ROU	Dragoș Coroiu (on loan to Dumbrăvița)
—	MF	ROU	Adrian Lazăr (on loan to Ghiroda)
—	MF	ROU	Sabin Lupu (to Filiași)
—	MF	ROU	Adrian Ungureanu (to Ghiroda)
—	FW	ROU	Răzvan Pițigoi (on loan to Ghiroda)
—	FW	ROU	Marvin Schieb (to Miercurea Ciuc)
—	FW	MDA	Artiom Zabun (on loan to Focșani)

=== Concordia Chiajna ===
In:

No.	Pos.	Nation	Player
—	DF	ROU	Andrei Marc (loan return from FCSB)
—	DF	ROU	Florin Borța (on loan from Universitatea Craiova)
—	DF	ROU	Stelian Cucu (from Free agent)
—	DF	CPV	Nivaldo (from Free agent)
—	DF	ROU	Cătălin Oanea (from Rapid București)
—	DF	NGR	Michael Odibe (from (Northern Cyprus) Mağusa Türk Gücü)
—	DF	ROU	Bogdan Vișan (from Pandurii Târgu Jiu)
—	MF	ROU	Ciprian Gliga (from Dunărea Călărași)
—	MF	ROU	Daniel Mihalcea (from Dacia Unirea Brăila)
—	MF	POR	Diogo Rosado (from Free agent)
—	MF	FRA	Karim Safsaf (from Sportul Snagov)
—	MF	ROU	Andrei Tîrcoveanu (on loan from Viitorul Constanța)
—	FW	ROU	Andrei Burlacu (on loan from Universitatea Craiova)
—	FW	BUL	Ventsislav Hristov (from (Bulgaria) Tsarsko Selo)

Out:

No.	Pos.	Nation	Player
—	DF	ROU	Vlad Olteanu (loan return to Dinamo București, later signed by Free agent)
—	GK	ROU	Georgian Mișu (on loan to Mostiștea Ulmu)
—	DF	ROU	Cristian Albu (to Academica Clinceni)
—	DF	ROU	Alin Dobrosavlevici (to Hermannstadt)
—	DF	ROU	Andrei Dumitraș (to CSM Reșița)
—	DF	ROU	Vladimir Georgescu (to Free agent)
—	DF	ROU	Andrei Paliu (to Dacia Unirea Brăila)
—	MF	ROU	Răzvan Grădinaru (to Politehnica Iași)
—	MF	FRA	Yanis Hamzaoui (to Free agent)
—	MF	ROU	Marian Obedeanu (on loan to Mostiștea Ulmu)
—	MF	ROU	Robert Riza (to Focșani)
—	FW	ROU	Paul Batin (to Minaur Baia Mare)
—	FW	FRA	Romain Davigny (to Free agent)
—	FW	ROU	Cosmin Neagu (to Alexandria)

=== CSM Reșița ===
In:

No.	Pos.	Nation	Player
—	GK	ROU	Alberto Cobrea (from Politehnica Iași)
—	DF	ROU	Alin Dudea (on loan from Dinamo București, previously on loan at Chindia Târgoviște)
—	DF	ROU	Andrei Dumitraș (from Concordia Chiajna)
—	DF	FRA	Yvan Erichot (from (Iceland) ÍBV)
—	DF	ROU	Rareș Ispas (on loan from CFR Cluj)
—	DF	COD	Arsène Luboya (from Ceahlăul Piatra Neamț)
—	DF	ROU	Laurențiu Rus (from Sănătatea Cluj)
—	MF	ROU	Victoraș Astafei (from Viitorul Târgu Jiu)
—	MF	ROU	Laurențiu Buș (from Academica Clinceni)
—	MF	ROU	Mădălin Calu (on loan from SCM Gloria Buzău)
—	MF	ROU	Emanuel Dat (from Academica Clinceni)
—	MF	ROU	Fernando Dobre (on loan from Dan Chilom)
—	MF	ROU	Alin Țegle (on loan from Universitatea II Craiova)
—	FW	ROU	Gabriel Dodoi (on loan from Rapid București)

Out:

No.	Pos.	Nation	Player
—	MF	ROU	Alin Lazăr (loan return to Dinamo București, later on loan at Focșani)
—	FW	ROU	Marius Coman (loan return to Universitatea Cluj)
—	FW	ROU	Gabriel Răducan (loan return to Dinamo București, later on loan at Oțelul Galați)
—	GK	ROU	Adrian Horvat (to Focșani)
—	GK	ROU	Flavius Toader (to Free agent)
—	DF	ROU	Alexandru Manea (to Free agent)
—	DF	ROU	Flavius Vlădia (to Ghiroda)
—	MF	ROU	Marian Musteța (to Free agent)
—	MF	ROU	Cristian Poiană (to Filiași)
—	MF	ROU	Dragoș Săulescu (to ASU Politehnica Timișoara)
—	MF	ROU	Raphael Stănescu (to Axiopolis Cernavodă, previously transferred from Daco-Getica București)
—	FW	ROU	Florin Cioablă (to Flacăra Horezu)
—	FW	ROU	Gelu Velici (to Ghiroda)

=== Daco-Getica București (excluded) ===
In:

No.	Pos.	Nation	Player

Out:

No.	Pos.	Nation	Player
—	DF	ROU	Bogdan Jica (loan return to Gaz Metan Mediaș, later on loan at Dunărea Călărași)
—	DF	ROU	Răzvan Prodan (loan return to Viitorul Constanța, later signed by Mostiștea Ulmu)
—	DF	ROU	Alexandru Socaci (loan return to Gaz Metan Mediaș)
—	DF	ROU	Radu Zamfir (loan return to Dinamo București)
—	MF	ROU	Liviu Gheorghe (loan return to Dinamo București, later on loan at Înainte Modelu)
—	MF	ROU	Andreas Iani (loan return to Viitorul Constanța, later on loan at Progresul Spartac)
—	MF	ROU	Mario Mihai (loan return to FCSB II, later on loan at Tunari)
—	FW	ROU	Gabriel Răducan (loan return to Dinamo București, later on loan at CSM Reșița)
—	GK	ROU	Răzvan Began (to Dunărea Călărași)
—	GK	ROU	Ionuț Gurău (to Unirea Slobozia)
—	GK	ROU	Mihai Irimiea (to Free agent)
—	DF	ROU	Bogdan Cuibari (to Free agent)
—	DF	ROU	Constantin Dedu (to Free agent)
—	DF	ROU	Denis Negoescu (to Free agent)
—	DF	ROU	Gabriel Plumbuitu (to Free agent)
—	DF	ROU	Andrei Puțaru (to Dunărea Călărași)
—	DF	ROU	Mihai Stancu (to Focșani)
—	DF	ROU	Alin Stoica (to Free agent)
—	DF	ROU	Andrei Voineag (to Free agent)
—	MF	ROU	Robert Neacșu (to Turris Turnu Măgurele)
—	MF	ROU	Marian Obreja (to Free agent)
—	MF	ROU	Franco Paraschiv (to Free agent)
—	MF	ROU	Raphael Stănescu (to CSM Reșița, later signed by Axiopolis Cernavodă)
—	MF	ROU	Marius Tudorică (to Axiopolis Cernavodă)
—	FW	ROU	Sabin Alexe (to Free agent)
—	FW	ROU	Nicolae Epure (to Free agent)

=== Dunărea Călărași ===
In:

No.	Pos.	Nation	Player
—	GK	ROU	Răzvan Began (from Daco-Getica București)
—	DF	ROU	Bogdan Jica (on loan from Gaz Metan Mediaș, previously on loan at Daco-Getica București)
—	DF	ROU	Andrei Puțaru (from Daco-Getica București)
—	DF	GRE	Konstantinos Rougalas (from (Greece) Panachaiki)
—	MF	FRA	Madikaba Doumbia (from Farul Constanța)
—	MF	ROU	George Tudoran (from Free agent)
—	MF	ROU	Claudiu Vereș (on loan from Sepsi Sfântu Gheorghe)
—	MF	ROU	Adrian Zaluschi (from Ripensia Timișoara)

Out:

No.	Pos.	Nation	Player
—	DF	ROU	Radu Crișan (loan return to Astra Giurgiu, later on loan at UTA Arad)
—	MF	ROU	Salvatore Marrone (loan return to FCSB II, later on loan at Miercurea Ciuc)
—	FW	CMR	Serge Ekollo (loan return to Astra Giurgiu, later on loan at Petrolul Ploiești)
—	GK	ROU	Gabriel Popa (to Retired)
—	DF	ROU	Alin Mutu (to (Austria) FC Lustenau)
—	MF	BRA	Matheus Dias (to (Brazil) Tupi)
—	MF	ROU	Ciprian Gliga (to Concordia Chiajna)
—	MF	ROU	Gabriel Preoteasa (to Viitorul Târgu Jiu)
—	MF	ROU	Andrei Zete (to Free agent)

=== Farul Constanța ===
In:

No.	Pos.	Nation	Player
—	GK	ROU	Mihai Eșanu (on loan from Dinamo București)
—	DF	ROU	Ionuț Coman (from CFR II Cluj)
—	DF	ROU	Marius Leca (on loan from Viitorul Constanța)
—	MF	ROU	Laurențiu Ardelean (on loan from FCSB II)
—	MF	MDA	Ion Cărăruș (from (Sweden) Härnösand)
—	MF	ROU	Cezar Gherghiceanu (from Turris Turnu Măgurele)
—	FW	ROU	Mădălin Martin (from Progresul 2005)

Out:

No.	Pos.	Nation	Player
—	GK	ROU	Cristian Andrei (loan return to FCSB II, later on loan at SCM Gloria Buzău)
—	DF	ROU	Radu Zamfir (loan return to FCSB II, later on loan at Metaloglobus București)
—	MF	ROU	Robert Băciuț (loan return to FCSB II, later on loan at Viitorul Târgu Jiu)
—	MF	ROU	Tudor Moldovan (loan return to FCSB II)
—	FW	ROU	Alexandru Bodea (loan return to FCSB II, later on loan at Progresul Spartac)
—	MF	FRA	Madikaba Doumbia (to Dunărea Călărași)
—	FW	ROU	Patrick Petre (to Dacia Unirea Brăila)
—	FW	ROU	Cosmin Zamfir (to Dacia Unirea Brăila)

=== Metaloglobus București ===
In:

No.	Pos.	Nation	Player
—	DF	ROU	Radu Zamfir (on loan from FCSB II, previously on loan at Farul Constanța)
—	MF	ROU	Andrei Ionescu (from Free agent)
—	MF	ROU	Eduard Vraciu (from Voluntari II)
—	FW	ROU	Raul Gavîrliță (on loan from Astra Giurgiu)

Out:

No.	Pos.	Nation	Player
—	DF	MDA	Alexandru Starîș (to (Moldova) Speranța Nisporeni)
—	MF	ROU	Robert Vâlceanu (to Free agent)
—	FW	ROU	Cosmin Ionică (to Tunari)
—	FW	ROU	Alexandru Potecea (to Free agent)

=== Miercurea Ciuc ===
In:

No.	Pos.	Nation	Player
—	MF	ROU	Kristóf Pál (loan return from Odorheiu Secuiesc)
—	DF	GRE	Christos Intzidis (from (Greece) Kalamata)
—	MF	SDN	Yasin Hamed (on loan from Sepsi Sfântu Gheorghe)
—	MF	ROU	Salvatore Marrone (on loan from FCSB II, previously on loan at Miercurea Ciuc)
—	MF	HUN	Norbert Pintér (from (Serbia) Bačka Topola)
—	FW	ARG	Juan Bauza (from (Argentina) Colón)
—	FW	ROU	Marvin Schieb (from ASU Politehnica Timișoara)

Out:

No.	Pos.	Nation	Player
—	GK	MNE	Damir Ljuljanović (to (Montenegro) Kom)
—	DF	ROU	Richárd Aszalos (on loan to Olimpic Cetate Râșnov)
—	DF	ROU	István Berde (to Free agent)
—	DF	HUN	Ákos Fodor (to Free agent)
—	DF	SRB	Slobodan Lalić (to (Serbia) Hajduk Kula)
—	DF	ROU	Szilárd Mitra (on loan to Odorheiu Secuiesc)
—	MF	ROU	Norbert Barta (on loan to Odorheiu Secuiesc)
—	MF	ROU	Marius Corbu (to (Hungary) Puskás Akadémia)
—	MF	ESP	Soufiane Jebari (to UTA Arad)
—	FW	ENG	Tamás Becze (on loan to CSM Bacău)
—	FW	ROU	László Hodgyai (on loan to Odorheiu Secuiesc)
—	FW	ESP	Raúl Juliá (to (Spain) Sant Rafel)
—	FW	ENG	Romaric Logon (on loan to Odorheiu Secuiesc)

=== Mioveni ===
In:

No.	Pos.	Nation	Player
—	DF	ESP	José Domínguez (from (Norway) Valdres)
—	DF	ROU	Raul Hreniuc (on loan from Universitatea Craiova)
—	DF	MDA	Ștefan Efros (from (Moldova) Speranța Nisporeni)

Out:

No.	Pos.	Nation	Player
—	DF	ROU	Remus Enache (loan return to Universitatea II Craiova)
—	DF	ROU	Daniel Celea (to Sepsi Sfântu Gheorghe)
—	MF	ROU	Cosmin Năstăsie (Retired)
—	MF	ROU	Marius Șimăndan (to Șoimii Lipova)

=== Pandurii Târgu Jiu ===
In:

No.	Pos.	Nation	Player

Out:

No.	Pos.	Nation	Player
—	GK	ROU	Mihai Cotolan (to Free agent)
—	GK	ROU	Iulian Dinu (to Oțelul Galați)
—	DF	ROU	Robert Bratu (to Focșani)
—	DF	ROU	Paul Chiș (to Sticla Arieșul Turda)
—	DF	ROU	Gabriel Oiță (to Comuna Recea)
—	DF	ROU	Bogdan Vișan (to Concordia Chiajna)
—	MF	ROU	Ion David (to Free agent)
—	MF	ROU	Adrian Nichifor (to Filiași)
—	MF	ROU	Ovidiu Rasoveanu (to Argeș Pitești)
—	FW	ROU	Rareș Cristea (to Ceahlăul Piatra Neamț)
—	FW	ROU	Daniel Unguru (to Unirea Slobozia)

=== Petrolul Ploiești ===
In:

No.	Pos.	Nation	Player
—	DF	ROU	Andrei Răuță (from Academica Clinceni)
—	MF	ROU	Mihai Nițescu (from Petrosport Ploiești)
—	MF	ARG	Leonel Pierce (from Botoșani)
—	MF	ESP	Pol Roigé (from (Sweden) Sundsvall)
—	MF	ALB	Armando Vajushi (from (Albania) Teuta Durrës)
—	FW	CMR	Serge Ekollo (on loan from Astra Giurgiu)

Out:

No.	Pos.	Nation	Player
—	MF	ROU	Ianis Stoica (loan return to Metaloglobus București)
—	DF	MDA	Petru Racu (to Free agent)
—	DF	BRA	Walace (to CSA Steaua București)
—	MF	ROU	Ionuț Cioinac (to Turris Turnu Măgurele)
—	MF	ROU	Bogdan Gavrilă (to SCM Gloria Buzău)
—	MF	ROU	Mădălin Mihăescu (to CSA Steaua București)
—	MF	ROU	Alexandru Munteanu (to ASU Politehnica Timișoara)
—	MF	ROU	Cătălin Ștefănescu (to Universitatea Cluj)
—	MF	ROU	Alexandru Zaharia (to CSA Steaua București)
—	FW	FRA	Guy Gnabouyou (to (Malaysia) Kuala Lumpur)

=== Rapid București ===
In:

No.	Pos.	Nation	Player
—	FW	ROU	Antonio Niță (loan return from Progresul Spartac)
—	GK	ROU	Mihai Popa (on loan from Astra Giurgiu)
—	DF	ROU	Paul Copaci (from Astra Giurgiu)
—	FW	ROU	Valentin Alexandru (from SCM Gloria Buzău)

Out:

No.	Pos.	Nation	Player
—	DF	ROU	Hristos Vadasis (loan return to Universitatea II Craiova)
—	DF	ROU	Vlad Mocioacă (on loan to Viitorul Dăești, previously on loan to Sportul Snagov)
—	DF	ROU	Adrian Neacșu (on loan to Foresta Suceava, previously on loan to Sportul Snagov)
—	DF	ROU	Catalin Oanea (to Concordia Chiajna)
—	FW	ROU	Gabriel Dodoi (on loan to CSM Reșița)
—	FW	ARG	Matías Roskopf (to (Cyprus) Apollon Limassol)

=== Ripensia Timișoara ===
In:

No.	Pos.	Nation	Player
—	GK	ROU	Horațiu Moldovan (from Sepsi Sfântu Gheorghe)
—	MF	MDA	Andrei Macrițchii (from (Moldova) Dinamo-Auto Tiraspol)
—	MF	MDA	Valeriu Macrițchii (from (Moldova) Dinamo-Auto Tiraspol)
—	MF	ROU	Cosmin Sârbu (from Sânmartin)
—	MF	MDA	Ivan Urvanțev (from (Moldova) Dinamo-Auto Tiraspol)

Out:

No.	Pos.	Nation	Player
—	GK	ROU	Haralambie Mociu (to Foresta Suceava)
—	DF	ROU	Călin Toma (to SCM Gloria Buzău)
—	MF	ROU	Adrian Zaluschi (to Dunărea Călărași)
—	FW	ROU	Marius Fotescu (to Free agent)
—	FW	ROU	Marius Staicu (to ACS Poli Timișoara)
—	FW	ROU	Albert Voinea (to Turris Turnu Măgurele)

=== SCM Gloria Buzău ===
In:

No.	Pos.	Nation	Player
—	GK	ROU	Cristian Andrei (on loan from FCSB II, previously on loan at Farul Constanța)
—	DF	ROU	Cătălin Savin (from Turris Turnu Măgurele)
—	GK	ROU	Călin Tudose (on loan from FCSB II)
—	DF	ROU	Călin Toma (from Ripensia Timișoara)
—	MF	ROU	Bogdan Gavrilă (from Petrolul Ploiești)
—	MF	ROU	Andrei Ignat (on loan from Râmnicu Sărat)
—	MF	ROU	Iulian Roșu (from Sportul Snagov)
—	MF	ROU	David Stăiculescu (from Voluntari II)
—	FW	ROU	Mihai Chică-Roșă (from Botoșani II)
—	FW	ROU	Constantin Stoica (from Sportul Snagov)

Out:

No.	Pos.	Nation	Player
—	MF	ROU	Daniel Vîlsan (loan return to Sport Team București, later on loan at Turris Turnu Măgurele)
—	FW	ROU	Liviu Godin (loan return to Sport Team București, later on loan at Minaur Baia Mare)
—	GK	ROU	Dragoș Balauru (to UTA Arad)
—	GK	ROU	Cristian Chirițescu (to Free agent)
—	GK	POR	Mickaël Meira (to (Armenia) Lori)
—	DF	FRA	Moussa Konaté (to Free agent)
—	MF	ROU	Alexandru Bourceanu (Retired)
—	MF	ROU	Mădălin Calu (on loan to CSM Reșița)
—	MF	ROU	Ricardo Mihalache (to Unirea Slobozia)
—	MF	GBS	Saná (to Free agent)
—	FW	ROU	Valentin Alexandru (to Rapid București)

=== Sportul Snagov (excluded) ===
In:

No.	Pos.	Nation	Player

Out:

No.	Pos.	Nation	Player
—	GK	ROU	George Micle (loan return to FCSB II, later on loan at Argeș Pitești)
—	DF	ROU	Vlad Mocioacă (loan return to Rapid București, later on loan at Viitorul Dăești)
—	DF	ROU	Adrian Neacșu (loan return to Rapid București, later on loan at Foresta Suceava)
—	MF	ROU	Raul Bucur (loan return to Petrolul Ploiești)
—	GK	ROU	Octavian Stanciu (to Dacia Unirea Brăila)
—	GK	ROU	Ionuț Vreme (to Free agent)
—	DF	ROU	Ionuț Baniță (to Viitorul Domnești)
—	DF	ROU	Doru Bratu (to Free agent)
—	DF	ROU	Alin Ghidurea (to Progresul Spartac)
—	DF	ROU	Cosmin Novac (to Dacia Unirea Brăila)
—	DF	ROU	Cristian Poștoarcă (to Dacia Unirea Brăila)
—	DF	ROU	Antonio Ristea (to Blejoi)
—	MF	ROU	George Apostol (to Balotești)
—	MF	ROU	Vlad Bărbulescu (to Free agent)
—	MF	ROU	Paul Cubleșan (to Dacia Unirea Brăila)
—	MF	ROU	Adrian Dorobanțu (to Free agent)
—	MF	ROU	Florin Lungu (to Dacia Unirea Brăila)
—	MF	ROU	Andrei Mirică (to Argeș Pitești)
—	MF	ROU	Alexandru Nechita (to Free agent)
—	MF	ROU	Mădălin Răileanu (to Blejoi)
—	MF	ROU	Iulian Roșu (to SCM Gloria Buzău)
—	MF	FRA	Karim Safsaf (to Concordia Chiajna)
—	MF	ROU	Alin Turbatu (to Free agent)
—	FW	ROU	Alexandru Rusu (to Blejoi)
—	FW	ROU	Giani Stere (to Free agent)
—	FW	ROU	Constantin Stoica (to SCM Gloria Buzău)

=== Turris Turnu Măgurele ===
In:

No.	Pos.	Nation	Player
—	GK	ROU	Dragoș Petrișor (on loan from Dinamo București, previously on loan at Unirea Bascov)
—	DF	NGR	Samson Nwabueze (from Flacăra Horezu)
—	MF	ROU	Ionuț Cioinac (from Petrolul Ploiești)
—	MF	SEN	Pape Gassama (from (Belgium) Royal Cappellen)
—	MF	ROU	Robert Neacșu (from Daco-Getica București)
—	MF	ROU	Tiberiu Serediuc (from Free agent)
—	MF	ROU	Daniel Vîlsan (on loan from Sport Team București, previously on loan at SCM Gloria Buzău)
—	FW	ROU	Albert Voinea (from Ripensia Timișoara)

Out:

No.	Pos.	Nation	Player
—	GK	ROU	Ionuț Rus (loan return to CFR Cluj)
—	DF	ROU	Claudiu Juncănaru (to Focșani)
—	DF	ROU	Cătălin Savin (to SCM Gloria Buzău)
—	MF	TOG	Charles Acolatse (to Free agent)
—	MF	ROU	Angel Ciutică (to Free agent)
—	MF	ROU	Cezar Gherghiceanu (to Farul Constanța)
—	MF	ROU	Alexandru Mitracu (to Free agent)
—	MF	ROU	Florin Radu (to Sporting Roșiori)
—	FW	ROU	Cristian Bud (to Minaur Baia Mare)
—	FW	BIH	Nedo Turković (to Argeș Pitești)

=== Universitatea Cluj ===
In:

No.	Pos.	Nation	Player
—	FW	ROU	Marius Coman (loan return from CSM Reșița)
—	DF	ROU	Răzvan Horj (on loan from CFR Cluj)
—	DF	ROU	Andrei Mureșan (from CFR Cluj)
—	DF	ROU	Robert Neciu (on loan from Viitorul Constanța, previously on loan at Chindia Târgoviște)
—	MF	ROU	Bogdan Barbu (from Academica Clinceni)
—	MF	ROU	Sebastian Mailat (on loan from CFR Cluj, previously on loan at Gaz Metan Mediaș)
—	MF	ROU	Dragoș Penescu (on loan from Botoșani)
—	MF	ROU	Cătălin Ștefănescu (from Petrolul Ploiești)

Out:

No.	Pos.	Nation	Player
—	GK	ROU	Árpád Tordai (loan return to Viitorul Constanța)
—	DF	POR	Tiago Gomes (to (Portugal) Alverca)
—	DF	ROU	Renato Imbrea (on loan to Luceafărul Oradea)
—	MF	POR	André Ceitil (to (Portugal) Vilafranquense)
—	MF	FRA	Arnaud Guedj (to (Luxembourg) Blue Boys Muhlenbach)
—	MF	ROU	Alexandru Roșca (on loan to Avântul Reghin, previously transferred from Free agent)
—	FW	ROU	Florin Burghele (to Foresta Suceava)
—	FW	POR	Hugo Firmino (to (Portugal) Estoril Praia)
—	FW	POR	Rafa Miranda (to Free agent)

=== UTA Arad ===
In:

No.	Pos.	Nation	Player
—	DF	ROU	Alexandru Deliman (loan return from Național Sebiș)
—	DF	ROU	Antonio Savin (loan return from Șoimii Lipova)
—	FW	ROU	Raul Obrad (loan return from Șoimii Lipova)
—	GK	ROU	Dragoș Balauru (from SCM Gloria Buzău)
—	DF	ROU	Radu Crișan (on loan from Astra Giurgiu, previously on loan at Dunărea Călărași)
—	DF	ALB	Simon Rrumbullaku (from Free agent)
—	MF	ESP	Soufiane Jebari (from Miercurea Ciuc)

Out:

No.	Pos.	Nation	Player
—	GK	ROU	Mirel Bolboașă (to Astra Giurgiu)
—	DF	ROU	Rareș Deta (on loan to CSM Slatina)
—	DF	ROU	Alin Șeroni (to Botoșani)
—	MF	BRA	Diego Lorenzi (to Oman Club)
—	FW	ROU	Albert Aslău (on loan to Șoimii Lipova)

=== Viitorul Târgu Jiu ===
In:

No.	Pos.	Nation	Player
—	GK	ROU	Roberto Bodea (from FC U Craiova)
—	DF	ROU	Alexandru Core (from Luceafărul Oradea)
—	MF	ROU	Robert Băciuț (on loan from FCSB II, previously on loan at Farul Constanța)
—	MF	ROU	Paul Mitrică (from Luceafărul Oradea)
—	MF	ROU	Gabriel Preoteasa (from Dunărea Călărași)
—	FW	ROU	Daniel Paraschiv (from Luceafărul Oradea)

Out:

No.	Pos.	Nation	Player
—	DF	ROU	Bogdan Porumb (loan return to Sănătatea Cluj)
—	MF	ROU	Marius Balogh (loan return to Crișul Sântandrei)
—	MF	ROU	Raul Hăjmășan (loan return to Gaz Metan Mediaș, later on loan at Minaur Baia Mare)
—	GK	ROU	Dragoș Bălan (to Free agent)
—	MF	ROU	Victoraș Astafei (to CSM Reșița)
—	MF	ROU	Mark Parnău (on loan to Luceafărul Oradea)
—	MF	POL	Rafał Zaborowski (to (Slovakia) Partizán Bardejov)
—	FW	ROU	Alexandru Pop (to ASU Politehnica Timișoara)
