= 2018–19 FC Academica Clinceni season =

Academica Clinceni
2018–19 season
- Owner: Clinceni Commune
- Chairman: Constantin Bigan
- Manager: Ilie Poenaru
- Stadium: Clinceni
- Cupa României: Round of 32
Home colours	Away colours

The 2018–19 is Academica Clinceni's 12th season of competitive football by Academica Clinceni, and the 6th consecutive in Liga II. Academica Clinceni will compete in the Liga II and in Cupa României.

== Previous season positions ==
	Competition	Position
(Romania)	Liga II	6th
(Romania)	Cupa României	Round of 32

== First-team squad ==
Last updated on 10 March 2019

Squad No.	Name	Nationality	Position(s)	Date of Birth (Age)
Goalkeepers
1	Octavian Vâlceanu	(Romania)	GK	13 October 1996 (age 30)
12	Andrei Ureche	(Romania)	GK	27 September 1998 (age 28)
88	Tudor Negrușa	(Romania)	GK	16 April 1999 (age 27)
99	Cristian Andrei	(Romania)	GK	22 April 2001 (age 25)
Defenders
5	Cătălin Găină	(Romania)	CB / DM	25 September 1995 (age 31)
6	Alexandru Dinu	(Romania)	CB	8 April 1998 (age 28)
21	Mihai Dobrescu	(Romania)	LB	12 September 1992 (age 34)
22	Paul Pîrvulescu	(Romania)	LB	11 August 1988 (age 38)
23	Andrei Răuță	(Romania)	CB	4 July 1995 (age 31)
29	Răzvan Patriche (captain)	(Romania)	CB	29 April 1986 (age 40)
Midfielders
3	Florin Achim	(Romania)	RM / RB	16 July 1991 (age 35)
7	Alexandru Nicola	(Romania)	LM / LB	29 May 1997 (age 29)
8	Vasile Olariu	(Romania)	CM	6 July 1987 (age 39)
10	Paul Pațurcă	(Romania)	CM	20 March 1996 (age 30)
11	Vlad Mihalcea	(Romania)	AM	28 October 1998 (age 28)
14	Mihailo Mitrov	(North Macedonia)	AM	5 March 1995 (age 31)
17	Ciprian Gliga	(Romania)	AM	17 April 1997 (age 29)
19	Bogdan Barbu	(Romania)	AM	13 April 1992 (age 34)
89	Adrian Șut	(Romania)	CM	30 April 1999 (age 27)
98	Ovidiu Horșia	(Romania)	AM	30 October 2000 (age 26)
Forwards
9	Alexandru Buziuc	(Romania)	CF / ST	15 March 1994 (age 32)
20	Robert Ion	(Romania)	SS / AM	5 September 2000 (age 26)
32	Salvatore Marrone	(Romania) (Italy)	CF / CM	5 May 2001 (age 25)
97	Cristian Dumitru	(Romania)	CF / ST	13 December 2001 (age 24)

=== Summer transfers ===
In:

No.	Pos.	Nation	Player
—	GK	ROU	Tudor Negrușa (from Unirea Slobozia)
—	DF	ROU	Alexandru Dinu (on loan from FCSB II)
—	DF	ROU	Mihai Dobrescu (from Viitorul Domnești, previously on loan)
—	DF	ROU	Alexandru Nicola (on loan from FCSB II, previously on loan at Dacia Unirea Brăila)
—	DF	ROU	Răzvan Patriche (from Afumați)
—	MF	ROU	Ovidiu Horșia (on loan from FCSB II)
—	MF	ROU	Robert Ion (on loan from FCSB II)
—	MF	MKD	Mihailo Mitrov (on loan from FCSB II)
—	MF	ROU	Vasile Olariu (from Afumați)
—	MF	ROU	Adrian Șut (from Pandurii Târgu Jiu)
—	FW	ROU	Constantin Stoica (from Argeș Pitești)

Out:

No.	Pos.	Nation	Player
—	DF	ROU	Ionuț Baniță (loan return to Viitorul Domnești)
—	DF	ROU	Raul Hreniuc (loan return to CS U Craiova)
—	MF	ROU	Mario Mihai (loan return to FCSB, later on loan at Turris-Oltul Turnu Măgurele)
—	MF	ROU	Marian Târșă (loan return to Botoșani)
—	FW	ROU	Sabin Moldovan (loan return to Politehnica Iași, later on loan at Alexandria)
—	FW	ROU	Alexandru Popescu (loan return to CS U Craiova, later on loan at Mioveni)
—	GK	ROU	Andrei Ureche (to Argeș Pitești)
—	GK	ROU	Eduard Ispas (to Viitorul Dragomirești Vale)
—	DF	ROU	Andrei Gal (to UTA Arad, later on loan at Gloria L.T. Cermei)
—	DF	ROU	Bogdan Ilie (to Popești-Leordeni)
—	MF	ROU	Cristian Balgiu (to Concordia Chiajna, previously on loan at Daco-Getica București)
—	MF	ROU	Vlad Bărbulescu (to Sportul Snagov, previously signed from Viitorul Domnești)
—	MF	ROU	Florin Chitaș (to FCSB II)
—	MF	ROU	Tiberiu Petriș (to Daco-Getica București)
—	FW	ROU	Andrei Blejdea (to Pandurii Târgu Jiu)
—	FW	ROU	Costin Curelea (Retired)
—	FW	ROU	Mihai Ion (to Tunari)
—	FW	ROU	Arthur Teuț (to Daco-Getica București)

== Pre-season and friendlies ==
Win Draw Loss

7 July 2018 Friendly	Academica Clinceni (Romania)	6–1	(Romania) Free agents	Buftea, Romania
11:00 UTC+3		Report		Stadium: CNAF

14 July 2018 Friendly	Argeș Pitești (Romania)	1–1	(Romania) Academica Clinceni	Pitești, Romania
11:00 UTC+3	Buleică 56'	Report	Gliga 68'	Stadium: Nicolae Dobrin

21 July 2018 Friendly	Academica Clinceni (Romania)	0–1	(Romania) Mioveni	Clinceni, Romania
11:00 UTC+3		Report	Al.Neagu 75' (pen.)	Stadium: Clinceni

25 July 2018 Friendly	Academica Clinceni (Romania)	4–1	(Romania) FCSB II	Clinceni, Romania
11:00 UTC+3	Găină; Barbu; Neagu; C.Stoica	Report		Stadium: Clinceni

28 July 2018 Friendly	Academica Clinceni (Romania)	3–3	(Romania) Unirea Slobozia	Clinceni, Romania
11:00 UTC+3	Barbu; Găină; Blejdea	Report	Goal	Stadium: Clinceni

30 January 2019 Friendly	Academica Clinceni (Romania)	1–1	(Romania) Popești-Leordeni	Clinceni, Romania
11:00 EET (UTC+2)	Goal	Report	Goal	Stadium: Clinceni 2

2 February 2019 Friendly	Academica Clinceni (Romania)	1–0	(Romania) Afumați	Clinceni, Romania
11:00 EET (UTC+2)	Pațurcă	Report		Stadium: Clinceni 2

6 February 2019 Friendly	Argeș Pitești (Romania)	3–1	(Romania) Academica Clinceni	Pitești, Romania
11:00 EET (UTC+2)	Enceanu 58'; Buhăescu 71'; Oancea 84'	Report	Patriche 50'	Stadium: Nicolae Dobrin 3

9 February 2019 Friendly	Academica Clinceni (Romania)	1–0	(Romania) Voluntari II	Clinceni, Romania
11:00 EET (UTC+2)	Goal	Report		Stadium: Clinceni 2

16 February 2019 Friendly	Academica Clinceni (Romania)	2–0	(Romania) Balotești	Clinceni, Romania
11:00 EET (UTC+2)	Olariu; F.Achim	Report		Stadium: Clinceni 2

== Competitions ==
Win Draw Loss

=== Overview ===
Competition	First match	Last match	Starting round	Final position	Record							
Competition	First match	Last match	Starting round	Final position	Pld	W	D	L	GF	GA	GD	Win %
Liga II	August 2018	–	Matchday 1	–	0	0	0	0	0	0	+0	—
Cupa României	August 2018	–	Fourth Round	–	0	0	0	0	0	0	+0	—
Total					0	0	0	0	0	0	+0	—

Last updated: 13 July 2018
Source: Competitions

=== Liga II ===
The Liga II fixture list was announced on 19 July 2018.

==== League table ====
Pos	Team	Pld	W	D	L	GF	GA	GD	Pts	Promotion or relegation
1	Chindia Târgoviște (C, P)	38	27	7	4	79	33	+46	88	Promotion to Liga I
2	Academica Clinceni (P)	38	28	3	7	77	24	+53	87	Promotion to Liga I
3	Universitatea Cluj	38	25	7	6	85	26	+59	82	Qualification to promotion play-off
4	Petrolul Ploiești	38	24	5	9	77	38	+39	77	
5	Sportul Snagov	38	21	7	10	56	37	+19	70	

Source: FRF (in Romanian), Soccerway
Rules for classification: 1) Points; 2) Head-to-head points; 3) Head-to-head goal difference; 4) Head-to-head goals scored; 5) Head-to-head away goals scored; 6) Goal difference; 7) Goals scored.
(C) Champions; (P) Promoted

==== Results summary ====
Overall								Home						Away					
Pld	W	D	L	GF	GA	GD	Pts	W	D	L	GF	GA	GD	W	D	L	GF	GA	GD
38	28	3	7	77	24	+53	87	15	2	2	44	9	+35	13	1	5	33	15	+18

Last updated: 1 June 2019.

==== Position by round ====
Round	1	2	3	4	5	6	7	8	9	10	11	12	13	14	15	16	17	18	19	20	21	22	23	24	25	26	27	28	29	30	31	32	33	34	35	36	37	38
Ground	A	H	A	H	A	H	A	A	H	A	H	A	H	A	H	A	H	A	H	H	A	H	A	H	A	H	H	A	H	A	H	A	H	A	H	A	H	A
Result	L	W	W	W	W	W	W	L	L	W	W	W	L	W	W	L	W	L	W	W	W	W	W	D	W	W	W	W	W	W	W	L	W	D	D	W	W	W
Position	12	8	5	3	2	1	1	2	3	2	2	1	3	2	2	5	4	5	3	3	2	1	1	1	1	1	1	1	1	1	1	1	2	2	2	2	2	2

Updated to match(es) played on 1 June 2019. Source: frfotbal.ro
A = Away; H = Home; W = Win; D = Draw; L = Loss

==== Matches ====
Win Draw Loss

4 August 2018 1	Mioveni	2–1	Academica Clinceni	Mioveni
11:00 EEST (UTC+3)	Al.Popescu 50'; V.Balint 86'	Report	Barbu 76'	Stadium: Orășenesc; Attendance: 200; Referee: Viorel Flueran (Craiova)

11 August 2018 2	Academica Clinceni	5–0	Daco-Getica București	Clinceni
11:00 EEST (UTC+3)	Horșia 8'; Gliga 12'; Gheorghe 78' (pen.); R.Ion 87'; V.Mihalcea 90+2'	Report		Stadium: Clinceni; Attendance: 300; Referee: Mihai Amorăriței (Câmpina)

18 August 2018 3	Farul Constanța	1–4	Academica Clinceni	Călărași
11:00 EEST (UTC+3)	Jallow 70'	Report	Gliga 17'; Olariu 20'; Al.Nicola 71'; V.Mihalcea 90'	Stadium: Ion Comșa; Attendance: 500; Referee: Robert Avram (Pitești)

25 August 2018 4	Academica Clinceni	7–0	Dacia Unirea Brăila	Clinceni
11:00 EEST (UTC+3)	Barbu 2', 23' (pen.); Găină 38'; R.Ion 59'; Dobrescu 61'; Gheorghe 69'; Horșia 90+2'	Report		Stadium: Clinceni; Attendance: 250; Referee: Bogdan Anghelinei (Galați)

2 September 2018 5	Ripensia Timișoara	0–3	Academica Clinceni	Timișoara
11:00 EEST (UTC+3)		Report	Olariu 3'; R.Ion 49'; Horșia 52'	Stadium: Dan Păltinișanu; Attendance: 150; Referee: Vladimir Nagy (Aiud)

8 September 2018 6	Academica Clinceni	1–0	ACS Poli Timișoara	Clinceni
11:00 EEST (UTC+3)	Gliga 22'	Report		Stadium: Clinceni; Attendance: 300; Referee: Dan Dreve (Cluj-Napoca)

15 September 2018 7	UTA Arad	0–1	Academica Clinceni	Arad
12:30 EEST (UTC+3)		Report	Barbu 76'	Stadium: Motorul; Attendance: 1,400; Referee: Cătălin Buși (Rm. Vâlcea)

22 September 2018 8	Luceafărul Oradea	1–0	Academica Clinceni	Oradea
12:30 EEST (UTC+3)	Ludușan 85'	Report		Stadium: Luceafărul; Attendance: 50; Referee: Denis Haidiner (Hunedoara)

29 September 2018 9	Academica Clinceni	0–1	Sportul Snagov	Clinceni
11:00 EEST (UTC+3)		Report	Patriche 77' (o.g.)	Stadium: Clinceni; Attendance: 300; Referee: Iulian Dima (Bucharest)

5 October 2018 10	Balotești	1–3	Academica Clinceni	Balotești
11:00 EEST (UTC+3)	V.Nicolae 45'	Report	Dobrescu 40'; Răuță 58'; V.Mihalcea 71'	Stadium: Central; Attendance: 200; Referee: Bogdan Anghelinei (Galați)

9 October 2018 11	Academica Clinceni	4–1	Pandurii Târgu Jiu	Clinceni
16:00 EEST (UTC+3)	R.Ion 16'; Vodă 30' (o.g.); Horșia 32'; Gliga 89'	Report	Tudoran 42'	Stadium: Clinceni; Attendance: 300; Referee: Ovidiu Oprea (Ploiești)

13 October 2018 12	Metaloglobus București	0–1	Academica Clinceni	Bucharest
11:00 EEST (UTC+3)		Report	Răuță 81'	Stadium: Metaloglobus; Attendance: 150; Referee: Eduard Ioniță (Galați)

20 October 2018 13	Academica Clinceni	0–1	Chindia Târgoviște	Clinceni
12:00 EEST (UTC+3)		Report	Cherchez 40'	Stadium: Clinceni; Attendance: 300; Referee: Adrian Cojocaru (Galați)

27 October 2018 14	Energeticianul	0–1	Academica Clinceni	Petroșani
11:00 EEST (UTC+3)		Report	Gliga 3'	Stadium: Jiul; Attendance: 200; Referee: Florin Andrei (Târgu Mureș)

3 November 2018 15	Academica Clinceni	2–0	ASU Politehnica Timișoara	Clinceni
11:00 EET (UTC+2)	Patriche 25'; Barbu 63' (pen.)	Report		Stadium: Clinceni; Attendance: 250; Referee: Adrian Illyeș (Ploiești)

11 November 2018 16	Universitatea Cluj	3–0	Academica Clinceni	Cluj-Napoca
11:30 EET (UTC+2)	Gavra 55'; Al.Coman 65'; Ursu 90+5'	Report		Stadium: Cluj Arena; Attendance: 3,200; Referee: Iulian Călin (Ștefănești)

17 November 2018 17	Academica Clinceni	2–1	Aerostar Bacău	Clinceni
11:00 EET (UTC+2)	Al.Nicola 28'; Șut 40'	Report	Căinari 31'	Stadium: Clinceni; Attendance: 100; Referee: Mihai Amorăriței (Câmpina)

23 November 2018 18	Argeș Pitești	1–0	Academica Clinceni	Pitești
17:30 EET (UTC+2)	I.Șerban 37'	Report		Stadium: Nicolae Dobrin; Attendance: 1,000; Referee: Cătălin Buși (Rm. Vâlcea)

27 November 2018 19	Academica Clinceni	2–1	Petrolul Ploiești	Clinceni
14:00 EET (UTC+2)	R.Ion 53', 65'	Report	R.Grecu 43'	Stadium: Clinceni; Attendance: 500; Referee: Marian Barbu (Făgăraș)

1 December 2018 20	Academica Clinceni	2–1	Mioveni	Clinceni
11:00 EET (UTC+2)	Dobrescu 34'; V.Mihalcea 85'	Report	V.Balint 21'	Stadium: Clinceni; Attendance: 50; Referee: Cristian Georgescu (Bucharest)

8 December 2018 21	Daco-Getica București	0–2	Academica Clinceni	Bucharest
11:00 EET (UTC+2)		Report	Dobrescu 3'; Răuță 16'	Stadium: Colentina; Attendance: 300; Referee: Ovidiu Oprea (Ploiești)

23 February 2019 22	Academica Clinceni	1–0	Farul Constanța	Clinceni
11:00 EET (UTC+2)	Bogdan Barbu 17'	Summary		Stadium: Clinceni; Attendance: 200; Referee: Viorel Nicușor Flueran

2 March 2019 23	Dacia Unirea Brăila	0–2	Academica Clinceni	Clinceni
11:00 EET (UTC+2)		Summary	Achim 30'; Pîrvulescu 60'	Stadium: Municipal; Attendance: 150; Referee: Vlad Băban

10 March 2019 24	Academica Clinceni	1–1	Ripensia Timișoara	Clinceni
11:00 EET (UTC+2)	Cristian Dumitru 61'	Summary	Andrei Dumiter 58'	Stadium: Clinceni; Attendance: 100; Referee: Bogdan Ionuț Anghelinei

16 March 2019 25	ACS Poli Timișoara	1–3	Academica Clinceni	Timișoara
11:00 EET (UTC+2)	Denis Golda 81'	Summary	Andrei Răuță 13'; Alexandru Nicola 63'; Mihalcea 90+2'	Stadium: Stadionul Electrica; Attendance: 100; Referee: Szabolcs Kovacs

23 March 2019 26	Academica Clinceni	2–0	UTA Arad	Clinceni
13:00 EET (UTC+2)	Bogdan Barbu 76' (pen.); Paul Pațurcă 88'	Summary		Stadium: Clinceni; Attendance: 200; Referee: Horia Gabriel Mladinovici

30 March 2019 27	Academica Clinceni	5–0	Luceafărul Oradea	Clinceni
11:00 EET (UTC+2)	Andrei Răuță 23'; Robert Ion 42'; Paul Pațurcă 70'; Buziuc 72' 90+2'	Summary		Stadium: Clinceni; Attendance: 400; Referee: Eduard Ioniţă

7 April 2019 28	Sportul Snagov	0–2	Academica Clinceni	Snagov
12:30 EEST (UTC+3)		Summary	Robert Ion 41'; Bogdan Barbu 55'	Stadium: Voința; Attendance: 300; Referee: Cătălin Popa

10 April 2019 29	Academica Clinceni	4–0	Balotești	Clinceni
12:00 EEST (UTC+3)	Buziuc 12'; Bogdan Barbu 23' (pen.) 81'; Robert Ion 77'	Summary		Stadium: Clinceni; Attendance: 300; Referee: Andrei Baciu

13 April 2019 30	Pandurii Târgu Jiu	0–2	Academica Clinceni	Târgu Jiu
11:00 EEST (UTC+3)		Summary	Robert Ion 23'; Olariu 52'	Stadium: Tudor Vladimirescu; Attendance: 200; Referee: Florin Ovidiu Mazilu

20 April 2019 31	Academica Clinceni	1–0	Metaloglobus București	Clinceni
11:00 EEST (UTC+3)	Buziuc 73'	Summary		Stadium: Clinceni; Attendance: 300; Referee: Cristian Omar Dumitrică

25 April 2019 32	Chindia Târgoviște	1–0	Academica Clinceni	Târgoviște
17:00 EEST (UTC+3)	Mihai 20'	Summary		Stadium: Eugen Popescu; Attendance: 4,000; Referee: Marian Alexandru Barbu

4 May 2019 33	Academica Clinceni	3–1	Energeticianul	Clinceni
11:00 EEST (UTC+3)	Șut 7' 21'; Cristian Dumitru 89'	Report	Cosmin Ionică 90+1' (pen.)	Stadium: Clinceni; Attendance: 700; Referee: Bogdan Dumitrache

11 May 2019 34	ASU Politehnica Timișoara	2–2	Academica Clinceni	Timișoara
13:00 EEST (UTC+3)	Ursu 45+1' 53'	Report	Șut 15'; Mihalcea 90+3'	Stadium: Știința; Attendance: 700; Referee: Sergiu Popa

16 May 2019 35	Academica Clinceni	0–0	Universitatea Cluj	Clinceni
18:00 EEST (UTC+3)		Report		Stadium: Clinceni; Attendance: 1,500; Referee: Lucian Ruşandu

19 May 2019 36	Aerostar Bacău	0–3	Academica Clinceni	Bacău
11:00 EEST (UTC+3)		Report	Șut 11'; Ciprian Gliga 53'; Buziuc 90'	Stadium: Aerostar; Attendance: 500; Referee: Eduard Ioniţă

24 May 2019 37	Academica Clinceni	2–1	Argeș Pitești	Clinceni
18:30 EEST (UTC+3)	Patriche 81'; Ovidiu Horșia 90+2'	Report	Năstăsie 7'	Stadium: Clinceni; Attendance: 1,000; Referee: Robert Dumitru

1 June 2019 38	Petrolul Ploiești	2–3	Academica Clinceni	Ploiești
17:00 EEST (UTC+3)	Marinescu 41' (pen.); Rusu 83'	Report	Buziuc 8' 28'; Salvatore Marrone 72'	Stadium: Ilie Oană; Attendance: 2,000; Referee: Horia Mladinovici

=== Cupa României ===
11 September 2018 Fourth Round	Tunari	0–2	Academica Clinceni	Tunari
16:30 EEST (UTC+3)		Report	Șut 2'; Barbu 90+5'	Stadium: Comunal; Referee: Adrian Costreie (Buftea)

26 September 2018 Round of 32	Academica Clinceni	0–2	Hermannstadt	Clinceni
16:30 EEST (UTC+3)		Report	Tsoumou 53'; Petrescu 66'	Stadium: Clinceni; Attendance: 400; Referee: Eduard Ioniță (Galați)

== Statistics ==
=== Appearances and goals ===
As of 1 July 2018

No.	Pos	Player	Liga II		Cupa României		Total	
No.	Pos	Player	Apps	Goals	Apps	Goals	Apps	Goals

=== Squad statistics ===
	Liga II	Cupa României	Home	Away	Total Stats
Games played	0	0	0	0	0
Games won	0	0	0	0	0
Games drawn	0	0	0	0	0
Games lost	0	0	0	0	0
Goals scored	0	0	0	0	0
Goals conceded	0	0	0	0	0
Goal difference	0	0	0	0	0
Clean sheets	0	0	0	0	0
Goal by Substitute	0	0	0	0	0
Players used	–	–	–	–	–
Yellow cards	0	0	0	0	0
Red cards	0	0	0	0	0
Winning rate	0%	0%	0%	0%	0%

Last updated: 13 July 2018
Source: Competitive matches

=== Goalscorers ===
As of 24 June 2018

Rank	Position	Name	Liga II	Cupa României	Total
Total			0	0	0

=== Goal minutes ===
	1'–15'	16'–30'	31'–HT	46'–60'	61'–75'	76'–FT	Extra time	Forfeit
Goals	0	0	0	0	0	0	0	0
Percentage	0%	0%	0%	0%	0%	0%	0%	0%

Last updated: 2018 (UTC)
Source: Soccerway

=== Hat-tricks ===
Player	Against	Result	Date	Competition

=== Clean sheets ===
As of 2018

Rank	Name	Liga II	Cupa României	Total	Games played
Total		0	0	0	0

=== Disciplinary record ===
As of 2018

Rank	Position	Name	Liga II			Cupa României			Total		
Rank	Position	Name	Yellow card	(yellow card) (yellow-red card)	Red card	Yellow card	(yellow card) (yellow-red card)	Red card	Yellow card	(yellow card) (yellow-red card)	Red card
Total			0	0	0	0	0	0	0	0	0

=== Attendances ===
As of 2018

	Matches	Attendances	Average	High	Low
Liga II	0	0	0	0	0
Cupa României	0	0	0	0	0
Total	0	0	0	0	0

== See also ==
- 2018–19 Liga II
- 2018–19 Cupa României
