= CS Păulești =

Romanian football club

- Full name: Clubul Sportiv Păulești
- Short name: Păulești
- Founded: 1959; 67 years ago as Rapid GAC Găgeni; 1973; 53 years ago as Petrolul Păulești; 1989; 37 years ago as Victoria Păulești
- Ground: Comunal
- Capacity: 500
- Owner: Păulești Commune
- Chairman: Vasile Vasile
- Manager: Florin Pripu
- League: Liga III
- 2025–26: Liga III, Seria II, 7th
Home colours	Away colours

Clubul Sportiv Păulești, commonly known as CS Păulești, is a Romanian football club based in Păulești, Prahova County, currently playing in Liga III, the third tier of the Romanian football league system.

== History ==
CS Păulești was established in 1959 in Găgeni, a village belonging to the Păulești commune, under the name of Rapid GAC Găgeni and became, from the summer of 1964, Rapid Păulești playing in the Ploiești City Championship, Category II, but was disbanded in 1966.

In 1973, football reappeared in Păulești, and the team was re-established under the name of Petrolul Păulești. Renamed again as Rapid Păulești, the team coached by Dumitru Iancu, won the Ploiești Municipal Championship Category II (1974) and Category I (1976), promoting to the County Championship 2nd Category after finishing in 2nd place at the final tournament played against Victoria Bordeni, Avântul Tomșani, Recolta Filipeștii de Târg and Victoria Olteni, on Prahova Stadium in Ploiești. However, Rapid Păulești was excluded in the first part of the 1980–81 season, which was followed by another long break in the team’s activity.

The club was refounded in the summer of 1989 under the name of Victoria Păulești and, under the guidance of Valeriu Manolescu, promoted to the County Championship 2nd Category at the end of the 1989–90 season.

From the summer of 1990, the club was taken over by the company Elancoop, with Gheorghe Tomescu appointed as head coach. Between 1992 and 1994, the team was self-financed and coached by Alexandru Fronea.

The team was renamed Uranus, with Marcel Urlățeanu serving as head coach, and was subsequently relegated to the county’s second division. In 1997, it returned to the first county league after the series winners, Avântul Măgureni, were denied promotion because their stadium was not approved.

Before the start of the 1997–98 season, the club changed its name to Petrolul Păulești and served as a development team for youth players of Petrolul Ploiești, under the management of Constantin Doru Tudorie. In the summer of 2000, the partnership with the Ploiești club ended, and the team was taken over by Dan Iancu, who at the time became the youngest president in county football.

In 2008, the club was renamed Artsani Păulești, and under this name it achieved promotion at the end of the 2008–09 season. After winning the West Series of Liga B Prahova, Artsani Păulești secured a place in Liga A Prahova, the top tier of county football, led by Daniel Iancu.

In the 2015–16 season, with Iulius Mărgărit on the bench, the club won its first county championship title and promoted to Liga III after the promotion play-off with Euromania Dumbrăveni, the winner of Liga IV – Vrancea County, 5–1 on aggregate (3–1 at Dumbrăveni and 2–0 at Păulești).

However, for financial reasons, the club did not register for the next Liga III season and returned to Liga IV – Prahova County where, in the 2016–17 season, it finished 4th in an edition dominated by Petrolul Ploiești. Also, in the same season, it played the final of the Cupa României – county phase at the Ilie Oană Stadium, losing 0–2 against Petrolul Ploiești. In the 2017–18 season, it finished as runners-up, in the 2018–19 season it ranked 10th, and in the 2019–20 season it was ranked 9th at the moment when the competition was interrupted due to the COVID-19 pandemic.

Resuming its activity starting with the 2021–22 season under the guidance of player-coach Florin Pripu, CS Păulești won once again the county title and promoted to the third league, winning the promotion play-off against Victoria Adunații-Copăceni, the winner of Liga IV – Giurgiu County, 3–2 on aggregate (0–1 at Păulești and 3–1 at Adunații-Copăceni).

Pripu led Păulești in its first season in Liga III, when the team ranked 6th in Series V, both at the end of the regular and play-out stages, with the contribution of former top-division player Valentin Lazăr, who joined after the winter break.

Following their move to Series IV, Păulești struggled throughout the 2023–24 season, finishing last both at the end of the regular and play-out stages, and were facing relegation. However, they were spared due to the withdrawal of other clubs. In the 2024–25 season, Păulești improved to finish 6th, both at the end of the regular and play-out stages.

== Honours ==
Liga IV – Prahova County

- Winners (2): 2015–16, 2021–22
- Runners-up (1): 2017–18

Liga V – Prahova County

- Winners (1): 2008–09

Cupa României – Prahova County

- Winners (3): 2014–15, 2015–16, 2017–18
- Runners-up (1): 2016–17

== Players ==
=== First team squad ===
As of 10 September 2024

Note: Flags indicate national team as defined under FIFA eligibility rules; some limited exceptions apply. Players may hold more than one non-FIFA nationality.

No.	Pos.	Nation	Player
1	GK	ROU	Narcis Nedelcu
3	DF	ROU	Rareș Stancu
4	DF	ROU	Marius Dumitru
5	DF	ROU	Ionuț Ștefan
6	DF	ROU	Robert Călin
7	MF	ROU	Constantin Dumitrașcu (Vice-Captain)
8	MF	ROU	Elis Popescu
9	FW	ROU	Ionuț Bobea
10	MF	ROU	Horia Nicolae
11	MF	ROU	Alin Baciu
14	MF	ROU	Andrei Cotuna
15	DF	ROU	Andrei Paliu

No.	Pos.	Nation	Player
16	MF	ROU	Marian Mihai
17	MF	ROU	Ionuț Pârvu
18	MF	ROU	Leonard Preda
19	MF	ROU	Andrei Ardeleanu
21	MF	ROU	Vlăduț Stancu
22	DF	ROU	Eduard Prodan
23	MF	ROU	Cătălin Comnoiu
24	GK	ROU	Andrei Ghersin
25	MF	NGA	Ikpemwinoghena Yakubu
30	MF	ROU	Robert Manghiniță (on loan from Petrolul)
34	GK	ROU	Darius Paris
52	MF	BRA	Romário Pires (Captain)

=== Out on loan ===
Note: Flags indicate national team as defined under FIFA eligibility rules; some limited exceptions apply. Players may hold more than one non-FIFA nationality.

No. / Pos. / Nation / Player	No. / Pos. / Nation / Player

== Club officials ==
=== Board of directors ===
Role	Name
Owner	(Romania) Păulești Commune
President	(Romania) Vasile Vasile
Sporting Director	(Romania) Daniel Iancu

=== Current technical staff ===
Role	Name
Manager	(Romania) Florin Pripu
Assistant Coach	(Romania) Vasile Cosarek (Brazil) Romário Pires
Goalkeeping Coach	(Romania) Eduard Preda
Fitness Coach	(Romania) Ioan Negreanu

== League and cup history ==
Season	Tier	Division	Place	Notes	Cupa României
2025–26	3	Liga III (Seria II)	TBD		First round
2024–25	3	Liga III (Seria V)	6th		First round
2023–24	3	Liga III (Seria IV)	10th		
2022–23	3	Liga III (Seria V)	6th		
2021–22	4	Liga IV (PH)	1st (C)	Promoted	
2017–18	4	Liga IV (PH)	2nd		
2016–17	4	Liga IV (PH)	4th		
2015–16	4	Liga IV (PH)	1st (C)		
2014–15	4	Liga IV (PH)	3rd		
