= Comunal Stadium (Păulești) =

Multi-use stadium in Păulești, Prahova, Romania

- Interactive map of Comunal Stadium
- Address: str. Nicolae Iorga
- Location: Păulești, Romania
- Coordinates: 45°00′27.1″N 25°57′29.3″E
- Owner: Commune of Păulești
- Operator: CS Păulești
- Capacity: 500 on seats
- Surface: Grass

Construction
- Opened: 1950s
- Renovated: 1980s, 2000s, 2017, 2022

Tenant
- CS Păulești (1959–present)

The Comunal Stadium is a multi-use stadium in Păulești, Prahova, Romania. It is used mostly for football matches, is the home ground of CS Păulești and holds 500 people on seats.
