= Vasile Paraschiv =

Romanian social and political activist

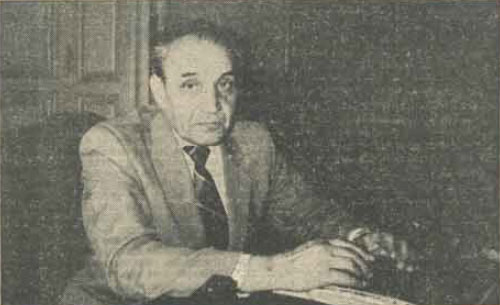
- Paraschiv in 1990
- Born: Vasile Paraschiv; April 3, 1928; Ordoreanu, Ilfov County, Kingdom of Romania
- Died: February 4, 2011 (age 82); Ploiești, Romania
- Title: Social activist, political activist
- Political party: Romanian Communist Party (1946–1968)
- Children: 1
- Awards: Order of the Star of Romania, Knight rank (declined)

Vasile Paraschiv (April 3, 1928 – February 4, 2011) was a Romanian social and political activist.

== Biography ==
Paraschiv was born in Ordoreanu village, Clinceni commune, Ilfov County. After 1940, he worked in Bucharest and after 1947 he worked for the Romanian Communist Party, Romanian Post (December 1947 – November 1949).

He was member of the Romanian Communist Party from November 1946 to November 1968. After his resignation from Romanian Communist Party, he was arrested in July 1969 and interned at the psychiatric hospital in Urlați. Eliberated after a hunger strike, he was re-arrested in March 1971 and committed to the psychiatric hospital in Câmpina. From the end of the 1960s until the Communism's fall in 1989, he was a victim of psychiatric repression.

He had tried to set up a trade union but was kidnapped and tortured three times by the Securitate secret police, which attempted to portray him as mentally disturbed.

Paraschiv was a collaborator of Paul Goma. In 2002, Goma wrote an article which includes a letter and Paraschiv's list of communist activists that persecuted him during communism. In 2008, Paraschiv was awarded by President Traian Băsescu the Order of the Star of Romania, Knight rank; he refused to be decorated by Băsescu, whom he labelled "a former communist". Paraschiv died in Ploiești in 2011 from heart failure.

== Works ==
- Vasile Paraschiv, Lupta mea pentru sindicate libere in România. Terorismul politic organizat de statul communist (Iași, 2005)
- Vasile Paraschiv, Așa nu se mai poate, tovarășe Nicolae Ceaușescu! (Bucharest: Curtea Veche, 2007)
