= István Fülöp (footballer) =

Romanian footballer

Personal information
- Full name: István Sándor Fülöp
- Date of birth: 18 May 1990 (age 36)
- Place of birth: Târgu Mureș, Romania
- Height: 1.82 m (6 ft 0 in)
- Positions: Attacking midfielder; winger

Youth career
- –2009: Avântul Reghin

Senior career*
| Years | Team | Apps | (Gls) |
| 2009–2012 | Avântul Reghin | 50 | (20) |
| 2012–2016 | Botoșani | 103 | (25) |
| 2017–2018 | Diósgyőr | 12 | (1) |
| 2017–2018 | → Sepsi OSK (loan) | 28 | (9) |
| 2018–2022 | Sepsi OSK | 59 | (7) |
| 2022–2023 | Békéscsaba | 2 | (0) |
| 2023 | Gloria Buzău | 4 | (0) |
| 2023–2025 | Unirea Ungheni (Note: The statistics for the 2023–24 Liga III seasons are unavailable.) | 6 | (0) |
| Total | | 264 | (62) |

International career
| 2018 | Székely Land | | |
- * Club domestic league appearances and goals as of 21 September 2024

István Sándor Fülöp (born 18 May 1990) is a Romanian professional footballer who plays as a midfielder.

== Club career ==
Fülöp made his debut on the professional league level in the Liga I for Botoșani on 21 July 2013 as a starter in a game against CFR Cluj.

On 23 December 2016, he signed for Nemzeti Bajnokság I club Diósgyőri VTK.

== International career ==
Fülöp was member of the Székely Land squad that finished 4th at the 2018 ConIFA World Football Cup.

== Personal life ==
Born in Târgu Mureș, Fülöp is of Hungarian ethnicity. His brother, Lóránd Fülöp is also a footballer.

== Career statistics ==
=== Club ===
As of match played 21 September 2024

Appearances and goals by club, season and competition
| Club | Season | League | | | National cup (Note: Includes Cupa României, Magyar Kupa) | | League cup (Note: Includes Cupa Ligii) | | Europe | | Other | | Total | |
| Club | Season | Division | Apps | Goals | Apps | Goals | Apps | Goals | Apps | Goals | Apps | Goals | Apps | Goals |
|---|---|---|---|---|---|---|---|---|---|---|---|---|---|---|
| Avântul Reghin | 2009–10 | Liga III | | | | | — | | — | | — | | | |
| Avântul Reghin | 2010–11 | Liga III | | | | | — | | — | | — | | | |
| Avântul Reghin | 2011–12 | Liga III | | | | | — | | — | | — | | | |
| Avântul Reghin | Total | | | | | | 0 | 0 | 0 | 0 | 0 | 0 | | |
| Botoșani | 2012–13 | Liga II | 15 | 3 | 2 | 0 | — | | — | | — | | 17 | 3 |
| Botoșani | 2013–14 | Liga I | 31 | 7 | 1 | 0 | — | | — | | — | | 32 | 7 |
| Botoșani | 2014–15 | Liga I | 17 | 3 | 1 | 0 | 1 | 1 | — | | — | | 19 | 4 |
| Botoșani | 2015–16 | Liga I | 28 | 5 | 2 | 0 | 0 | 0 | 0 | 0 | — | | 30 | 5 |
| Botoșani | 2016–17 | Liga I | 12 | 7 | 0 | 0 | 2 | 0 | — | | — | | 14 | 7 |
| Botoșani | Total | | 103 | 25 | 6 | 0 | 3 | 1 | 0 | 0 | 0 | 0 | 112 | 26 |
| Diósgyőr | 2016–17 | Nemzeti Bajnokság I | 12 | 1 | 2 | 0 | — | | — | | — | | 14 | 1 |
| Diósgyőr | 2017–18 | Nemzeti Bajnokság I | 0 | 0 | 0 | 0 | — | | — | | — | | 0 | 0 |
| Diósgyőr | Total | | 12 | 1 | 2 | 0 | 0 | 0 | 0 | 0 | 0 | 0 | 14 | 1 |
| Sepsi OSK (loan) | 2017–18 | Liga I | 28 | 9 | 0 | 0 | — | | — | | — | | 28 | 9 |
| Sepsi OSK | 2018–19 | Liga I | 15 | 0 | 0 | 0 | — | | — | | — | | 15 | 0 |
| Sepsi OSK | 2019–20 | Liga I | 30 | 4 | 5 | 2 | — | | — | | — | | 35 | 6 |
| Sepsi OSK | 2020–21 | Liga I | 7 | 2 | 1 | 0 | — | | — | | — | | 8 | 2 |
| Sepsi OSK | 2021–22 | Liga I | 7 | 1 | 1 | 0 | — | | — | | — | | 8 | 1 |
| Sepsi OSK | Total | | 87 | 16 | 7 | 2 | 0 | 0 | 0 | 0 | 0 | 0 | 94 | 18 |
| Békéscsaba | 2022–23 | Nemzeti Bajnokság I | 2 | 0 | 1 | 0 | — | | — | | — | | 3 | 0 |
| Gloria Buzău | 2022–23 | Liga II | 4 | 0 | — | | — | | — | | 1 (Note: Appearance in Liga I promotion/relegation play-offs) | 0 | 5 | 0 |
| Unirea Ungheni | 2023–24 | Liga III | | | 1 | 1 | — | | — | | 4 (Note: Appearances in Liga III - Promotion Play-Offs) | 0 | 5 | 1 |
| Unirea Ungheni | 2024–25 | Liga I | 6 | 0 | 2 | 1 | — | | — | | — | | 8 | 1 |
| Unirea Ungheni | Total | | 6 | 0 | 3 | 2 | 0 | 0 | 0 | 0 | 4 | 0 | 13 | 2 |
| Career total | | | 214 | 42 | 19 | 4 | 3 | 1 | 0 | 0 | 5 | 0 | 241 | 47 |

== Honours ==
Botoșani

- Liga II: 2012–13

Sepsi OSK

- Cupa României: 2021–22
