= Florin Pripu =

Romanian footballer

Personal information
- Date of birth: 1 August 1980
- Place of birth: Târgoviște, Romania
- Height: 1.83 m (6 ft 0 in)
- Position: Defender

Team information
- Current team: Păulești (manager)

Senior career*
Years	Team	Apps	(Gls)
2005–2006	Ethnikos Piraeus	34	(2)
2007–2008	Panetolikos	29	(0)
2008–2009	Koropi	27	(1)
2009–2010	Rodos	31	(0)
2010–2011	Thrasyvoulos	20	(0)
2011–2012	Kallithea	14	(0)
2012	Cisnădie	4	(0)
2013	Conpet Ploiești		
2013–2023	Păulești	31	(19)
2023	CSO Băicoi	1	(1)
Total		191	(23)

Managerial career
- 2021–: Păulești
- * Club domestic league appearances and goals

Florin Pripu (born 1 August 1980) is a former professional football defender who plays for teams such as Ethnikos Piraeus, Panetolikos, Rodos, Kallithea or CS Păulești, among others.
