= CS Unirea Ungheni =

Romanian football club

Unirea Ungheni
- Full name: Club Sportiv Unirea Ungheni 2018
- Nickname(s): Unghenenii (The people from Ungheni); Nireștenii (The people from Ungheni); Roș-Albaștrii (The Reds and Blues)
- Short name: Unirea
- Founded: 1947; 78 years ago as Unirea Ungheni; 2007; 18 years ago as ASA Unirea Ungheni; 2018; 7 years ago as Unirea Ungheni 2018
- Dissolved: 2025
- Ground: Central
- Capacity: 2,000

Club Sportiv Unirea Ungheni 2018, also known as Unirea Ungheni, or simply as Ungheni, was a Romanian football club based in Ungheni, Mureș County.

Unirea Ungheni's traditional colors are red and blue, and the team plays its home matches at the Central Stadium in Ungheni, which has a seating capacity of 2,000, earning promotion to the second division at the end of the 2023–24 season after defeating Gloria Bistrița-Năsăud in the promotion play-off.

== History ==
Unirea Ungheni was founded in 1947 and played mostly in district, regional, and county championships.

Unirea won the Mureș County Championship for the first time in the 1992–93 season, but the team led by player-coach Carol Erős failed to secure promotion to the third division. The club finished below the top sixteen teams with the best aggregate results after matches against Industria Sârmei Câmpia Turzii (0–3 away and 4–0 at home). The squad consisted of the following players: Ioan Bordaș, Zoltán Gyulai, Emil Olteanu, Emil Dobozi, Ștefan Szabó, Sorin Grama, Nicolae Bertea, Gheorghe Neagoe, Sorin Nistor, Gheorghe Botez, Marcel Țânțărean, Carol Erős, Vasile Blaga II, Ioan Nyárádi, Eugen Popa, Gheorghe Vasiu, Florin Dima, István Osváth, and Ioan Costea.

Over the next seven seasons, Unirea continued to compete in the County Championship, achieving the following rankings: 3rd in the 1993–94, 5th in the 1994–95, 4th in the 1995–96, 7th in the 1996–97, 6th in 1997–98, 7th in 1998–99 and 5th in 1999–2000.

Unirea Ungheni achieved its first-ever promotion to Divizia C at the end of the 2000–01 season. Coached by Arpád Fazakas, the team won the Divizia D – Mureș County title and secured promotion by defeating Eciro Forest Telciu, winners of Divizia D – Bistrița-Năsăud County, 4–2 in a decisive play-off match at the Ion Moina Stadium in Cluj-Napoca. The squad included players such as Gyulai Zoltán, Adrian Profir, Claudiu Popescu, Marius Florea, Cosmin Boitoș, Mihai Laurențiu, Augustin Ținteșan, Ioan Feșteu, Nicolae Bokor, Florin Suciu, Cornel Șerban, József Szávuly, and Ioan Ötvös.

In the first season in the third tier, Nireștenii, led by Fazakas in the first half of the campaign and Eduard Bota in the second, finished 9th in Series VII. The following season saw Unirea again finish 9th, three and six points ahead of county rivals Avântul Reghin and ASA Târgu Mureș, respectively.

In the 2003–04 season, Bota was replaced during the winter break by Lucian Popa, but Unirea still managed to achieve the best result of this period, finishing 2nd in Series IX, twenty-seven points behind FC Sibiu.

In the next season, the Reds and Blues finished 10th, narrowly avoiding relegation by two points. However, the following season ended in disaster as Unirea finished last out of 14 in Series IX with only one win secured throughout the entire campaign and just seven points, leading to relegation to the fourth division and the club's subsequent dissolution.

In 2007, the third-division side ASA Maris Târgu Mureș was relocated to Ungheni, where it merged with Unirea to form ASA Unirea Ungheni. Coached by Ioan Orosfăian for the following five consecutive seasons, the team finished the 2007–08 season in 11th place in Series VI. In the subsequent seasons, Unirea recorded the following rankings—6th in 2008–09, 10th in 2009–10, 7th in 2010–11, and 9th in 2011–12. Unfortunately, in 2012, financial difficulties forced the club to withdraw from the third division, leading to its dissolution for the second time in its history.

The club was refounded in 2018 and admitted on demand to Liga IV – Mureș County, finishing 3rd in the 2018–19 season and winning the Cupa României county phase under the leadership of Eduard Bota.

The 2019–20 season, which was suspended in March 2020 due to the COVID-19 pandemic, saw Unirea in 1st place and designated as Mureș County winners, qualifying for the promotion play-off to Liga III. Competing in Group A of Region 3 (Center) in Brașov, at the Silviu Ploeșteanu Stadium, the team led by Ioan Adrian Pop finished ahead of Măgura Cisnădie, the Sibiu County winners (6–1), and Sepsi OSK's second team, the Covasna County winners (2–0), earning promotion to Liga III after an eight-year absence.

In the 2023–24 Liga III season, under the command of Florentin Petre, with experienced players such as István Fülöp, Victoraș Astafei, Amancio Fortes, Cătălin Savin together with Ovidiu Horșia, Paul Ganea, Yvan Ndiesse, Abel Popa, Silviu Boar, Cristian Gherasim, Ioan Bârstan among others, the club finished in 3rd place during the regular season, but finished 2nd in the Play-off round of Series IX, overtaking ACS Mediaș and qualifying for the promotion play-offs. Unirea won in the first round against SCM Zalău (3–0 at home and 1–1 at Zalău), and in the second round against Gloria Bistrița-Năsăud (2–2 at Bistrița and 2–1 at Ungheni) promoted for first time in Liga II.

== Honours ==
Divizia C / Liga III

- Runners-up (3): 2003–04, 2022–23, 2023–24

Divizia D / Liga IV – Mureș County

- Winners (3): 1992–93, 2000–01, 2019–20

Cupa României – Mureș County

- Winners (1): 2018–19

== League history ==
Season	Tier	Division	Place	Notes	Cupa României
2024–25	2	Liga II	16th	Ceded place to ASA	Group stage
2023–24	3	Liga III (Seria IX)	2nd	Promoted	Third round
2022–23	3	Liga III (Seria IX)	2nd		Third round

Season	Tier	Division	Place	Notes	Cupa României
2021–22	3	Liga III (Seria IX)	3rd		Third round
2020–21	3	Liga III (Seria IX)	5th		Second round
2019–20	4	Liga IV (MS)	1st (C)	Promoted	Third round

== Notable former players ==
The footballers enlisted below have had international cap(s) for their respective countries at junior and/or senior level and/or significant caps for CS Unirea Ungheni.

Romania

- (Romania) Victoraș Astafei
- (Romania) István Fülöp
- (Romania) Cătălin Savin

== Former managers ==
- (Romania) Arpád Fazakas (2000–2001)
- (Romania) Eduard Bota (2002–2003)
- (Romania) Florentin Petre (2023–2024)
- (Romania) Eusebiu Tudor (2024–2025)
