= Central Stadium (Ungheni) =

Stadium in Romania

Stadionul Central
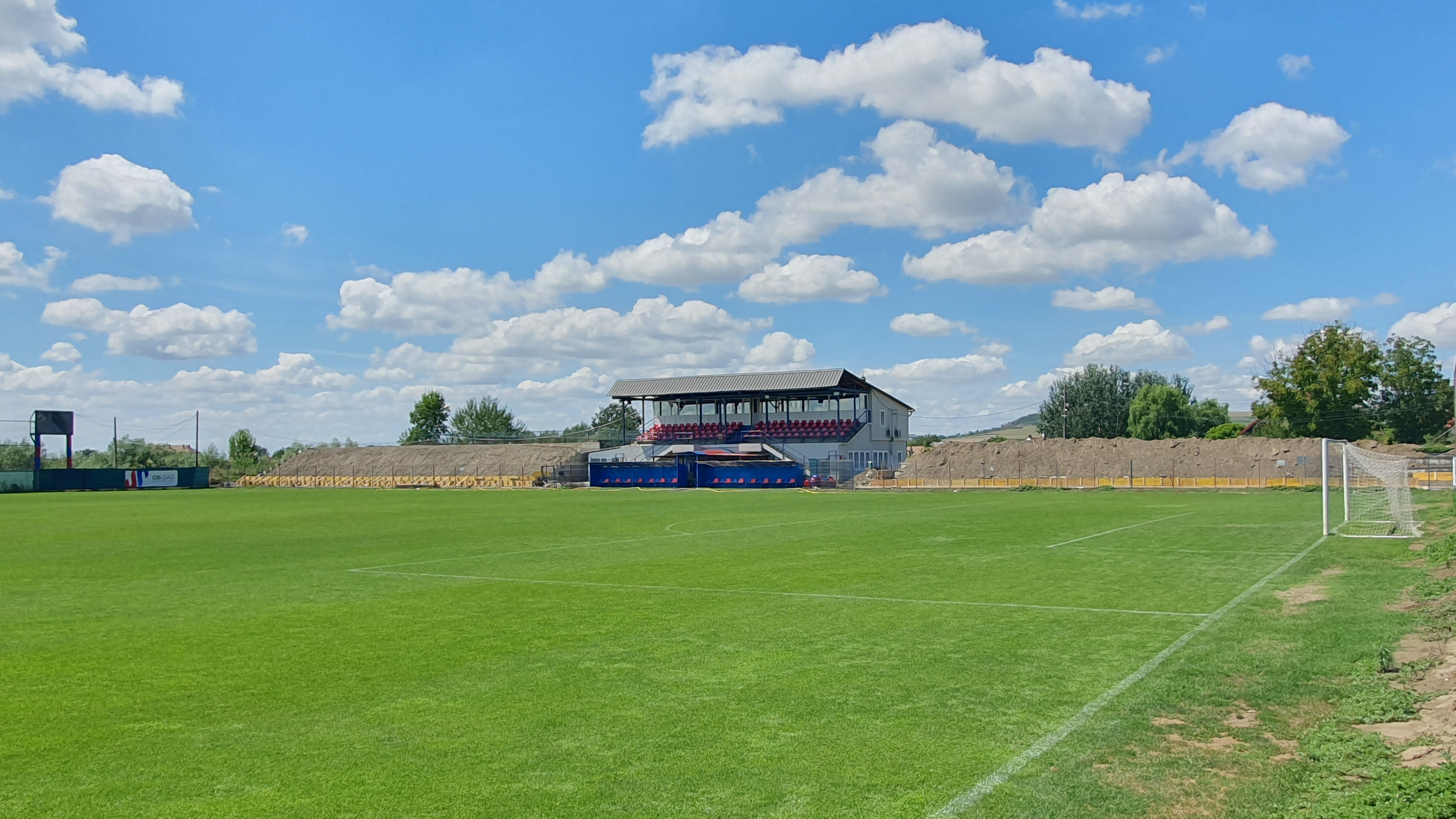
- Interactive map of Stadionul Central
- Address: Str. Poștei 370-377
- Location: Ungheni, Romania
- Coordinates: 46°28′51.7″N 24°27′39.8″E
- Owner: Town of Ungheni
- Operator: Unirea Ungheni
- Capacity: 2,000 seated
- Surface: Grass

Construction
- Opened: 1980s

Tenants
- Various teams Unirea Ungheni (2018–present)

Central Stadium is a multi-purpose stadium in Ungheni, Romania. It is currently used mostly for football matches, has a capacity of 2,000 seats and is the home ground of Unirea Ungheni.
