= Marvin Schieb =

Romanian footballer

Personal information
- Date of birth: 27 July 1996 (age 30)
- Place of birth: Ellwangen, Germany
- Height: 1.75 m (5 ft 9 in)
- Position: Forward

Team information
- Current team: Voluntari
- Number: 19

Youth career
- Interstar Sibiu
- Gaz Metan Mediaș
- Pandurii Târgu Jiu
- –2015: Universitatea Cluj

Senior career*
Years	Team	Apps	(Gls)
2015–2016	Universitatea Cluj	18	(1)
2016–2017	ASA Târgu Mureș	11	(0)
2018–2020	ASU Politehnica Timișoara	39	(2)
2020–2023	FK Csíkszereda	70	(11)
2023–2024	1599 Șelimbăr	28	(3)
2024–	Voluntari	64	(4)
- * Club domestic league appearances and goals as of 2 November 2026

Marvin Schieb (born 27 July 1996) is a Romanian professional footballer who plays as a forward for Liga I club Voluntari.
