= Clinceni =

- Commune
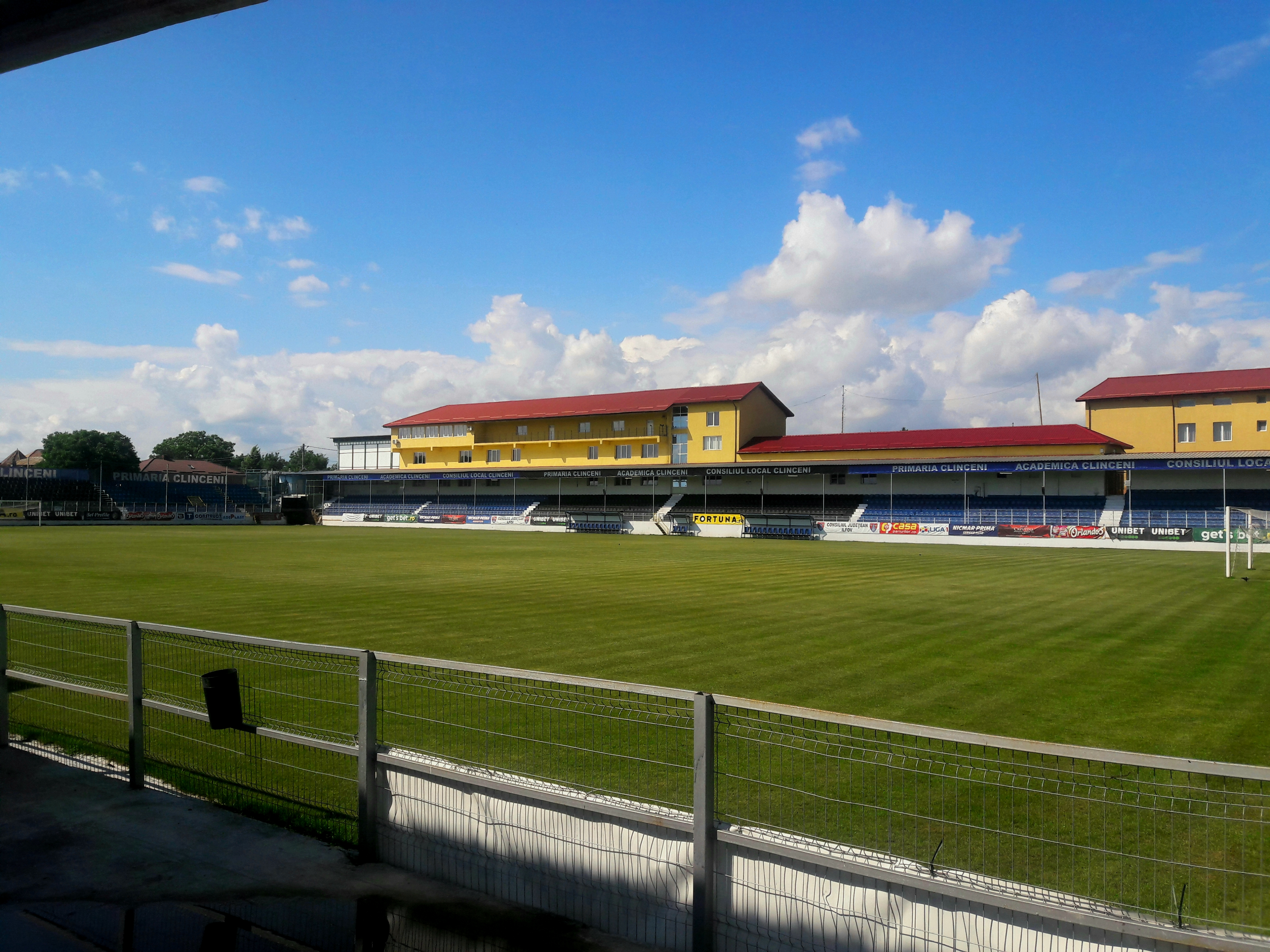
- The Clinceni football stadium

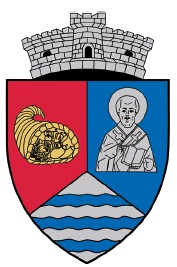
- Coat of arms

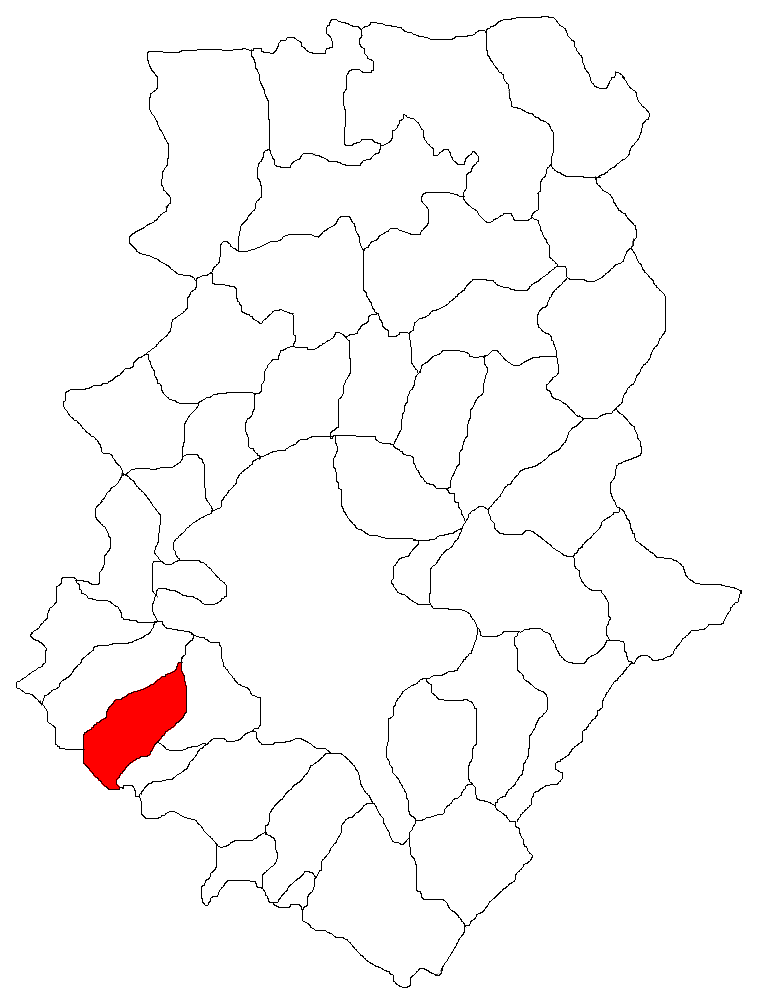
- Location in Ilfov County

- Location in Romania
- Coordinates: 44°22′40″N 25°56′35″E
- Country: Romania
- County: Ilfov

Government
  - Mayor (2024–2028): Adrian Budeanu (PNL)
- Area: 23.67 km^{2} (9.14 sq mi)
- Elevation: 85 m (279 ft)
- Population (2021-12-01): 9,478
  - Density: 400.4/km^{2} (1,037/sq mi)
- Time zone: UTC+02:00 (EET)
  - Summer (DST): UTC+03:00 (EEST)
- Postal code: 077060
- Area code: +(40) 21
- Vehicle reg.: IF
- Website: primaria-clinceni.ro

Clinceni is a commune in the southwestern part of Ilfov County, Muntenia, Romania. It is composed of three villages: Clinceni, Olteni, and Ordoreanu. The location hosts a small airport.

Currently, the village of Clinceni has the Guinness World Records for the biggest flag ever made. The flag, of Romania, weighs 5 tonnes (4.9 long tons; 5.5 short tons) and measures 349 metres (1,145 feet) by 227 m (745 ft). Work on the flag required 2 months and 70 kilometres (43 miles) of thread. Previously, Lebanon was the country with this record.

Clinceni also has a football team named LPS HD Clinceni who play in the Liga III, the third level of the Romanian football league system. Its home ground, the Clinceni Stadium, has a capacity of 4,500 seats.

Historical population
Year	Pop.	±%
2002	4,938	—
2011	6,806	+37.8%
2021	9,478	+39.3%
Source: Census data

== Natives ==
- Vasile Paraschiv (1928 – 2011), social and political activist
