= Andrei Paliu =

Romanian footballer

Personal information
- Full name: Andrei Răzvan Paliu
- Date of birth: 11 July 2000 (age 26)
- Place of birth: Bucharest, Romania
- Height: 1.80 m (5 ft 11 in)
- Position: Defender

Team information
- Current team: Păulești
- Number: 15

Youth career
- –2018: Concordia Chiajna

Senior career*
Years	Team	Apps	(Gls)
2018–2019	Concordia Chiajna	13	(0)
2020–2022	Dacia Unirea Brăila	20	(1)
2022	Astra Giurgiu	9	(0)
2022–2023	Filiași	16	(2)
2023–2024	Jiul Petroșani	11	(1)
2024	Progresul Spartac	7	(0)
2024–	Păulești	14	(2)
- * Club domestic league appearances and goals as of 13:02, 27 December 2024 (UTC)

Andrei Răzvan Paliu (born 11 July 2000) is a Romanian professional footballer who plays as a defender for Liga III club CS Păulești. He made his debut in Liga I on 26 May 2019, in a match between Concordia and Politehnica Iași, ended with the score of 4-1.
