= Cătălin Savin =

Romanian footballer

Personal information
- Full name: Cătălin Mihai Savin
- Date of birth: 8 November 1990 (age 36)
- Place of birth: Odorheiu Secuiesc, Romania
- Height: 1.80 m (5 ft 11 in)
- Position: Midfielder

Team information
- Current team: Odorheiu Secuiesc

Youth career
- –2010: Gaz Metan Mediaș

Senior career*
Years	Team	Apps	(Gls)
2010–2012	Gaz Metan Mediaș	0	(0)
2012	→ Cisnădie (loan)		
2012–2014	Concordia Chiajna	22	(1)
2014	Rapid București	6	(0)
2015	Afumați		
2015	FCM Baia Mare	0	(0)
2016–2018	FK Csíkszereda		
2018–2019	Turris Turnu Măgurele	16	(0)
2020	Gloria Buzău	4	(0)
2020–2021	FK Csíkszereda	17	(0)
2021–2023	Odorheiu Secuiesc	49	(6)
2023–2025	Unirea Ungheni	38	(0)
2025–	Odorheiu Secuiesc	0	(0)

International career
2010	Romania U19	2	(0)
- * Club domestic league appearances and goals as of 10 May 2025

Cătălin Mihai Savin (born 8 November 1990) is a Romanian professional footballer who plays as a defender for Liga III club Odorheiu Secuiesc.

== Honours ==
Turris Turnu Măgurele

- Liga III: 2018–19

Odorheiu Secuiesc

- Liga III: 2021–22
