= Clinceni Stadium =

Multi-purpose stadium in Clinceni, Romania

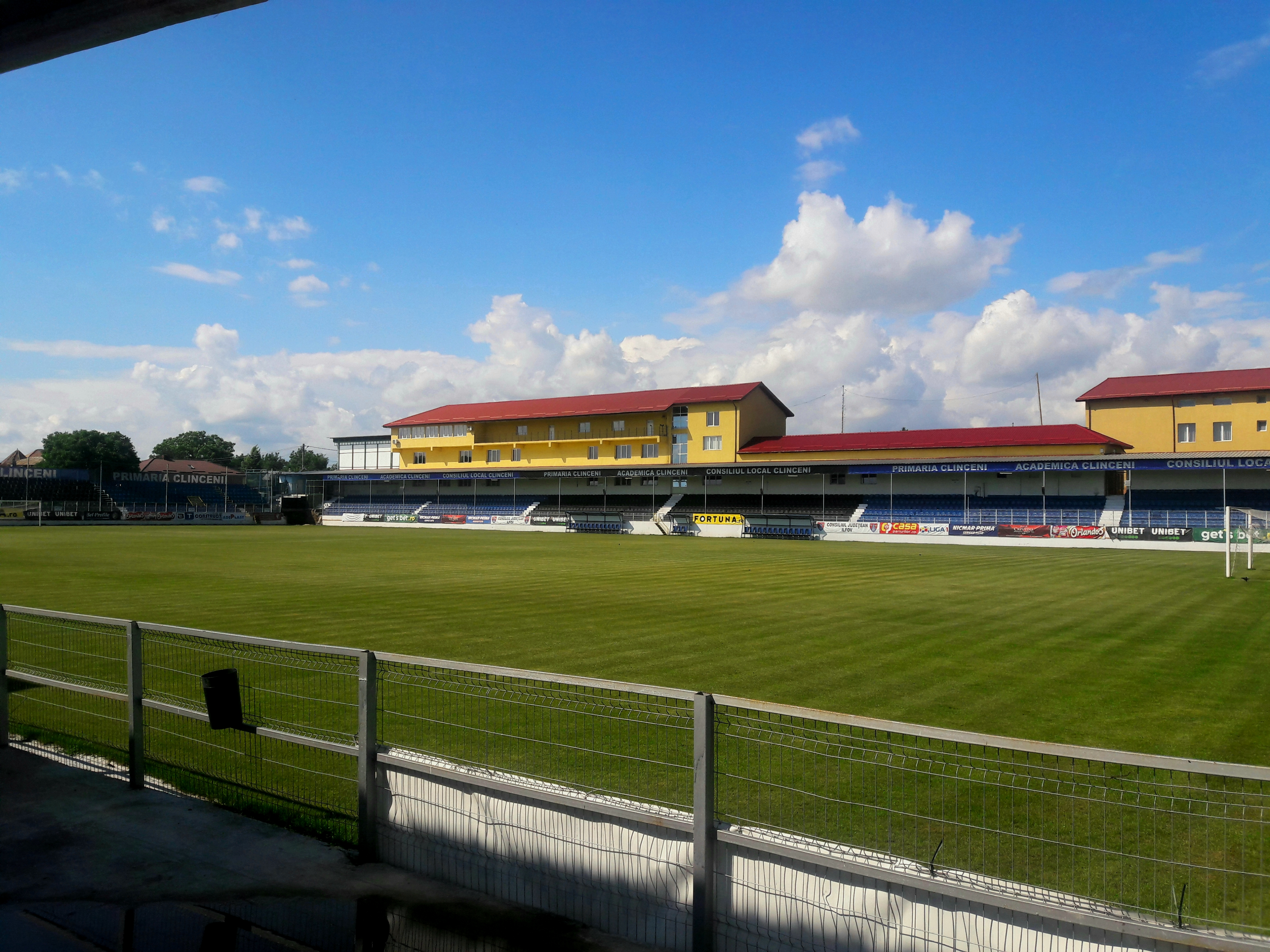
- Interactive map of Clinceni Stadium
- Address: Str. Principală, nr. 107a
- Location: Clinceni, Romania
- Coordinates: 44°22′40″N 25°56′27″E
- Owner: Commune of Clinceni
- Operator: LPS HD Clinceni
- Capacity: 4,502 seated
- Surface: Grass

Construction
- Opened: 2011
- Renovated: 2019
- Expanded: 2018–2019

Tenant
- LPS HD Clinceni (2005–present)

The Clinceni Stadium is a multi-purpose stadium in Clinceni, Romania. It is currently used mostly for football matches and is the home ground of LPS HD Clinceni. The stadium has a capacity of 4,502 seats.
