= Bogdan Ilie =

Romanian footballer

Personal information
- Full name: Bogdan Ilie
- Date of birth: 30 October 1999 (age 27)
- Place of birth: Bucharest, Romania
- Height: 1.77 m (5 ft 10 in)
- Position: Midfielder

Team information
- Current team: Academica Clinceni
- Number: 99

Youth career
- Academica Clinceni

Senior career*
Years	Team	Apps	(Gls)
2017–	Academica Clinceni	11	(0)
2018–2019	→ Popești-Leordeni (loan)		
- * Club domestic league appearances and goals as of 20 August 2020

Bogdan Ilie (born 30 October 1999) is a Romanian professional footballer who plays as a defender for Liga I side Academica Clinceni.
