= Ovidiu Horșia =

Romanian footballer

Personal information
- Date of birth: 30 October 2000 (age 26)
- Place of birth: Târgu Mureș, Romania
- Height: 1.72 m (5 ft 8 in)
- Position: Midfielder

Youth career
- 2012–2017: Kinder Târgu Mureș
- 2017–2018: FCSB

Senior career*
Years	Team	Apps	(Gls)
2018–2023	FCSB	1	(0)
2018–2019	→ Academica Clinceni (loan)	28	(5)
2019–2020	→ Politehnica Iași (loan)	34	(5)
2020–2022	→ Gaz Metan Mediaș (loan)	32	(1)
2022	→ Unirea Constanța (loan)	3	(0)
2022–2023	→ Universitatea Cluj (loan)	7	(0)
2023	CSM Alexandria	7	(1)
2024–2025	Unirea Ungheni	2	(0)

International career
2016	Romania U15	1	(0)
2016	Romania U16	3	(0)
2016–2017	Romania U17	3	(0)
2018–2019	Romania U19	6	(0)
- * Club domestic league appearances and goals as of 21 September 2024

Ovidiu Horșia (born 30 October 2000) is a Romanian professional footballer who plays as a midfielder.

== Honours ==
Universitatea Cluj

- Cupa României runner-up: 2022–23
