= Andrei Mirică =

Romanian professional footballer

Personal information
- Full name: Andrei Cristian Mirică
- Date of birth: 13 March 2001 (age 25)
- Place of birth: Bucharest, Romania
- Position: Midfielder

Team information
- Current team: Clinceni
- Number: 10

Youth career
- 2011–2014: FC Dinamo București
- 2014–2018: ASF Dănilescu

Senior career*
Years	Team	Apps	(Gls)
2018–2019	CSM Deva	25	(1)
2019–2020	CS Sportul Snagov	14	(0)
2020–2021	FC Argeș Pitești	12	(1)
2021	Popești-Leordeni	9	(4)
2022	Concordia Chiajna	3	(0)
2022–2023	Foresta Suceava	5	(0)
2023	Flacăra Horezu	12	(1)
2023–	Clinceni	35	(14)
- * Club domestic league appearances and goals as of 11:47, 23 December 2024 (UTC)

Andrei Cristian Mirică (born 13 March 2001) is a Romanian professional footballer who plays as a midfielder for Liga III club LPS HD Clinceni. In his career, Mirică also played for CSM Deva, CS Sportul Snagov or FC Argeș Pitești.

== Career statistics ==
As of match played 13 December 2020

Appearances and goals by club, season and competition
Club	Season	League			Cupa României		Other		Total	
Club	Season	Division	Apps	Goals	Apps	Goals	Apps	Goals	Apps	Goals
Cetate Deva	2018–19	Liga III	25	1	0	0	0	0	25	1
Sportul Snagov	2019–20	Liga II	14	0	0	0	0	0	14	0
Argeș Pitești	2019–20	Liga II	5	1	0	0	0	0	5	1
Argeș Pitești	2020–21	Liga I	7	0	0	0	0	0	7	0
Argeș Pitești	Total		12	1	0	0	0	0	12	1
Career total			51	2	0	0	0	0	51	2
