= Mihai Dobrescu =

Romanian professional footballer

Personal information
- Date of birth: 12 September 1992 (age 34)
- Place of birth: Otopeni, Romania
- Height: 1.73 m (5 ft 8 in)
- Position: Defender

Team information
- Current team: Concordia Chiajna
- Number: 21

Youth career
- –2011: Otopeni

Senior career*
Years	Team	Apps	(Gls)
2012–2013	Ceahlăul Piatra Neamț	0	(0)
2013	→ Otopeni (loan)	7	(0)
2013–2014	Chindia Târgoviște		
2014–2015	Balotești	16	(0)
2015–2017	Viitorul Domnești		
2018–2021	Academica Clinceni	119	(6)
2021–2022	Gaz Metan Mediaș	13	(0)
2022	Universitatea Cluj	6	(0)
2022–2023	UTA Arad	15	(0)
2023–2024	CSA Steaua București	18	(0)
2024–	Concordia Chiajna	58	(2)
- * Club domestic league appearances and goals as of 10 October 2026

Mihai Dobrescu (born 12 September 1992) is a Romanian professional footballer who plays as a defender for Liga II club Concordia Chiajna.
