= Raoul Baicu =

Romanian professional footballer

Personal information
- Full name: Raoul Petre Baicu
- Date of birth: 5 April 2000 (age 26)
- Place of birth: Bucharest, Romania
- Height: 1.74 m (5 ft 9 in)
- Position: Winger

Youth career
- 2011–2015: Voluntari
- 2015–2018: Universitatea Craiova

Senior career*
Years	Team	Apps	(Gls)
2018–2020	Universitatea Craiova	10	(0)
2020–2021	Astra Giurgiu	5	(1)
- * Club domestic league appearances and goals as of 13:10, 17 February 2022 (UTC)

Raoul Petre Baicu (born 5 April 2000) is a Romanian professional footballer who plays as a forward.
