= Karim Safsaf =

French footballer (born 1994)

Personal information
- Date of birth: 27 March 1994 (age 32)
- Place of birth: Béziers, France
- Height: 1.78 m (5 ft 10 in)
- Position: Midfielder

Youth career
- 2012–2014: Monaco
- 2014: → Brest (loan)

Senior career*
Years	Team	Apps	(Gls)
2012–2014	Monaco II	4	(0)
2014	→ Brest II (loan)	8	(0)
2014–2015	Toulouse Rodéo	15	(3)
2015–2016	Ajaccio	4	(0)
2015–2016	Ajaccio II	13	(1)
2016	Olimpia Itá	0	(0)
2016–2019	Kénitra	18	(0)
2019	Sportul Snagov	20	(1)
2020	Concordia Chiajna	9	(0)
2021	RC Oued Zem	9	(0)
- * Club domestic league appearances and goals

Karim Safsaf (born 27 March 1994) is a French former professional footballer who played as a midfielder.

== Career ==
=== Monaco and loan to Brest ===
Safsaf came through the youth system at Monaco and had a short spell at Brest in 2014, but did not break into the first team at either club.

=== Toulouse Rodéo ===
He spent the 2014–15 season with CFA 2 side Toulouse Rodéo, where he scored three goals in 15 league matches

=== Ajaccio ===
Safsaf joined Ajaccio in July 2015. On 24 November 2015, he made his professional debut, coming on as a substitute for Johan Cavalli in the 1–1 draw away at Red Star.

=== Olimpia Itá ===
In July 2016, Safsaf joined Paraguayan club Olimpia Itá.

=== Kénitra ===
On 19 September 2016, Safsaf joined Moroccan club Kénitra.

=== Sportul Snagov ===
On 10 April 2019, Safsaf joined Liga II side Sportul Snagov.

=== Concordia Chiajna ===
In February 2020, Safsaf joined Liga II side Concordia Chiajna.
