= Bogdan Jica =

Romanian professional footballer

Personal information
- Full name: Bogdan Cristian Jica
- Date of birth: 3 July 2000 (age 26)
- Place of birth: Blaj, Romania
- Height: 1.88 m (6 ft 2 in)
- Position: Defender

Team information
- Current team: CIL Blaj
- Number: 5

Youth career
- Gaz Metan Mediaș

Senior career*
Years	Team	Apps	(Gls)
2019–2022	Gaz Metan Mediaș	1	(0)
2019	→ Daco-Getica București (loan)	13	(0)
2020	→ Dunărea Călărași (loan)	2	(0)
2022	→ Hermannstadt (loan)	0	(0)
2022–2023	Mediaș	31	(5)
2024	Voința Sibiu	11	(0)
2024–	CIL Blaj	14	(0)
- * Club domestic league appearances and goals as of 11:12, 25 December 2024 (UTC)

Bogdan Cristian Jica (born 3 July 2000) is a Romanian professional footballer who plays as a defender for Liga III side CIL Blaj. In his career, Jica also played for teams such as: Daco-Getica București or Dunărea Călărași.

== Honours ==
ACS Mediaș

- Liga IV: 2022–23
