= Gabriel Răducan =

Romanian footballer

Personal information
- Date of birth: 7 November 2000 (age 26)
- Place of birth: Galați, Romania
- Height: 1.76 m (5 ft 9 in)
- Position: Forward

Team information
- Current team: Cetatea Suceava
- Number: 15

Youth career
- Junior Galați
- –2018: Dinamo București

Senior career*
Years	Team	Apps	(Gls)
2018–2022	Dinamo București	1	(0)
2019	→ Daco-Getica București (loan)	12	(2)
2019	→ CSM Reșița (loan)	7	(0)
2020–2021	→ Oțelul Galați (loan)		
2021	→ Dacia Unirea Brăila (loan)	13	(2)
2022–2026	Unirea Braniștea		
2026–	Cetatea Suceava	11	(8)

International career
2018	Romania U19	2	(0)
- * Club domestic league appearances and goals as of 31 October 2026

Gabriel Răducan (born 7 November 2000) is a Romanian professional footballer who plays as a forward for Liga II club Cetatea Suceava.

== Club career ==
=== Dinamo București ===
He made his Liga I debut for Dinamo București against Sepsi OSK on 1 June 2018. In September 2021, he was loaned to Dacia Unirea Brăila.

== Honours ==
Oțelul Galați

- Liga III: 2020–21

Unirea Braniștea

- Liga III: 2024–25
- Liga IV – Galați County: 2021–22

Cetatea Suceava

- Liga III: 2025–26
