= Costin Gheorghe =

Romanian footballer

Personal information
- Date of birth: 8 January 1989 (age 37)
- Place of birth: Bucharest, Romania
- Height: 1.71 m (5 ft 7 1/2 in)
- Position: Striker

Senior career*
Years	Team	Apps	(Gls)
2006–2011	Sportul Studențesc	104	(4)
2011–2013	Gaz Metan Mediaș	11	(1)
2013	Rapid București	0	(0)
2014	Inter Clinceni	0	(0)
2014–2015	Gaz Metan Mediaș	5	(0)
2016–2019	Academica Clinceni	61	(7)
Total		181	(12)
- * Club domestic league appearances and goals as of 29 January 2019

Costin Gheorghe (born 8 January 1989 in Bucharest) is a Romanian former footballer who played as a striker for Sportul Studențesc, Gaz Metan Mediaș, Rapid București, Inter Clinceni and Academica Clinceni. His sister, Elena Gheorghe, is a well-known singer in Romania, representing her country at the 2009 Eurovision Song Contest. Costin also appeared in a TV show named Exatlon România, in 2019.

== Career ==
Costin Gheorghe made his debut in Liga I for Sportul Studențesc in March 2006, in a match against FC Farul Constanța. He played two games in Liga I, because Sportul Studențesc was relegated at the end of the season due to financial reasons.

He established himself as a regular in the Sportul Studențesc first team in the next season, scoring his first career goal on 26 August 2006 against FC Brașov, as The Crazy Gang won by 2 goals to 1. At the end of his second season, he played 27 matches and scored 2 goals.

On 5 September 2009 Costin Gheorghe scored a scorcher from distance in the Liga II match against FC Snagov. He scored another goal from distance a few days later, in the Romanian Cup match against Dinamo II București, won by Sportul, 5–0.
