= Bogdan Barbu (footballer) =

Romanian professional footballer

Personal information
- Full name: Bogdan Florian Barbu
- Date of birth: 13 April 1992 (age 34)
- Place of birth: Bucharest, Romania
- Height: 1.78 m (5 ft 10 in)
- Position: Midfielder

Team information
- Current team: CS Dinamo
- Number: 19

Youth career
- Sportul Studențesc

Senior career*
Years	Team	Apps	(Gls)
2012–2013	Sportul Studențesc	11	(1)
2013–2017	Juniorul București		
2014	→ Fortuna Poiana Câmpina (loan)		
2014–2015	→ Voluntari (loan)	15	(2)
2015–2017	→ Viitorul Domnești (loan)	25	(6)
2017–2019	Academica Clinceni	82	(22)
2020-2021	Universitatea Cluj	12	(0)
2021–2022	Rapid București	14	(1)
2022	Concordia Chiajna	6	(0)
2022–2023	Tunari	26	(5)
2024–	CS Dinamo	31	(12)
- * Club domestic league appearances and goals as of 12:01, 21 December 2024 (UTC)

Bogdan Florian Barbu (born 13 April 1992) is a Romanian professional footballer who plays as a midfielder for CS Dinamo București.

== Club career ==
=== Sportul Studențesc ===
Barbu he started his career playing for the club in his hometown Sportul Studențesc.He made his senior debut in a game in which he came on from the bench in the 66th minute replacing Leonard Dobre, game which his team won 2–0 against Farul Constanța in Liga II on 1 September 2012.

=== Loan to Voluntari ===
On 9 July 2014, Barbu joined Liga II side Voluntari on loan for one season.

=== Universitatea Cluj ===
On 13 January 2020, Barbu joined Liga II side Universitatea Cluj.

== Honours ==
Fortuna Poiana Câmpina

- Liga III: 2013–14

FC Voluntari

- Liga II: 2014–15
