= Ciprian Gliga =

Romanian professional footballer

Personal information
- Full name: Ciprian Gheorghe Gliga
- Date of birth: 17 April 1997 (age 29)
- Place of birth: Reghin, Romania
- Height: 1.78 m (5 ft 10 in)
- Position: Midfielder

Youth career
- Viitorul Mihai Georgescu

Senior career*
Years	Team	Apps	(Gls)
2015–2017	Viitorul Mihai Georgescu		
2015–2016	→ Avântul Reghin (loan)		
2017–2021	Academica Clinceni	57	(12)
2019	→ Dunărea Călărași (loan)	12	(1)
2020	→ Concordia Chiajna (loan)	1	(0)
- * Club domestic league appearances and goals as of 14 April 2021

Ciprian Gheorghe Gliga (born 17 April 1997) is a Romanian professional footballer who plays as a midfielder. In his career, Gliga also played for teams such as: Avântul Reghin, Dunărea Călărași or Concordia Chiajna.
