= Păulești, Prahova =

Păulești
- Commune
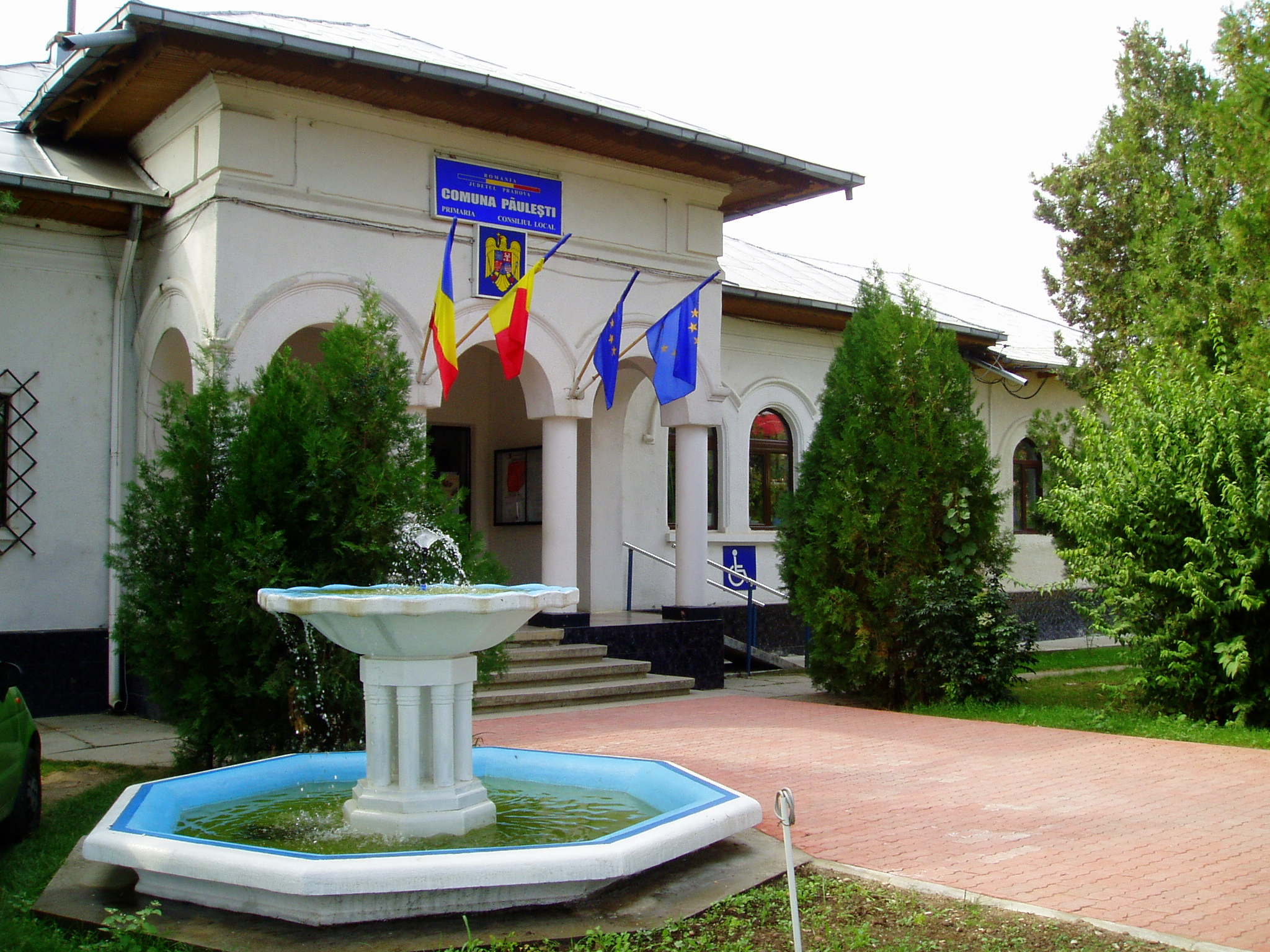
- Păulești town hall

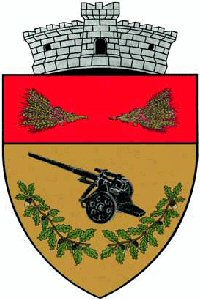
- Coat of arms

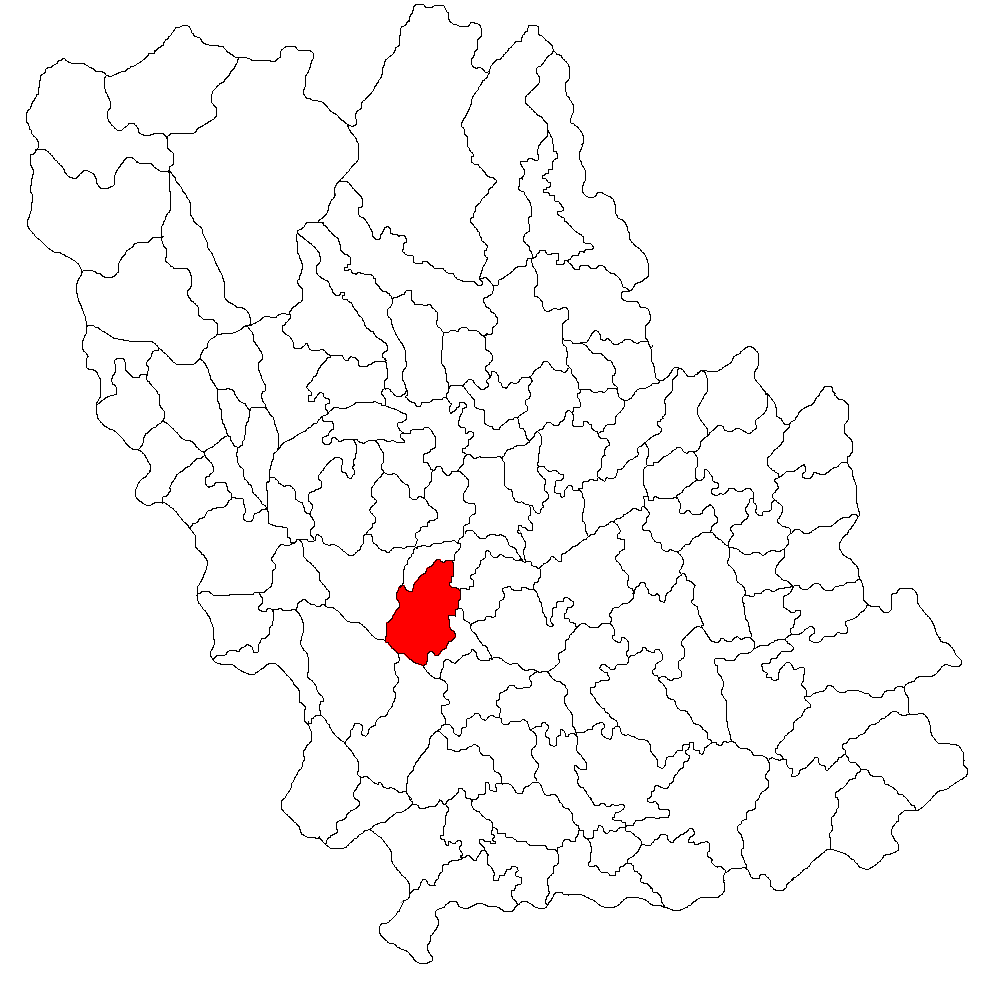
- Location in Prahova County

- Location in Romania
- Coordinates: 45°00′N 25°58′E
- Country: Romania
- County: Prahova

Government
  - Mayor (2020–2024): Tudor Sandu (PNL)
- Area: 53.98 km^{2} (20.84 sq mi)
- Elevation: 217 m (712 ft)
- Population (2021-12-01): 7,985
  - Density: 147.9/km^{2} (383.1/sq mi)
- Time zone: UTC+02:00 (EET)
  - Summer (DST): UTC+03:00 (EEST)
- Postal code: 107400
- Area code: +(40) 244
- Vehicle reg.: PH
- Website: comunapaulesti.ro

Păulești is a commune in Prahova County, Muntenia, Romania. It is composed of four villages: Cocoșești, Găgeni, Păulești, and Păuleștii Noi.

Historical population
Year	Pop.	±%
1992	5,119	—
2002	5,170	+1.0%
2011	5,886	+13.8%
2021	7,985	+35.7%
Source: Census data
