= Andrei Răuță =

Romanian footballer

Personal information
- Date of birth: 4 July 1995 (age 31)
- Place of birth: Roman, Romania
- Height: 1.89 m (6 ft 2 in)
- Position: Defender

Youth career
- –2012: Racing Colombes
- 2012–2014: Guingamp

Senior career*
Years	Team	Apps	(Gls)
2012–2014	Guingamp B	2	(0)
2015	Astra Giurgiu	0	(0)
2015–2016	Bucovina Pojorâta	29	(2)
2016–2017	Balotești	42	(3)
2018–2020	Academica Clinceni	55	(6)
2020–2021	Petrolul Ploiești	14	(1)
2021	Universitatea Cluj	6	(0)
2021–2023	Metaloglobus București	32	(0)
2023–2024	CSM Reșița	10	(0)
2024	Dumbrăvița	2	(0)
2024	Mioveni	9	(0)

International career
2014	Romania U19	1	(0)
- * Club domestic league appearances and goals as of 23 November 2024

Andrei Răuță (born 4 July 1995) is a Romanian professional footballer who plays as a defender.

== Club career ==
=== Racing Colombes & Guingamp ===
Răuță grew up in Racing Colombes Academy and made its debut at professional level for second team of En Avant de Guingamp.

=== Bucovina Pojorâta & Balotești ===
In the following years Răuță played in the Romanian second league for teams such as Bucovina Pojorâta, CS Balotești and Academica Clinceni, managing to promote in the Liga I with the last one.

=== Academica Clinceni ===
He made its debut in the Liga I on 14 July 2019, for Academica Clinceni, in a 2-3 defeat against CS Universitatea Craiova.

=== Petrolul Ploiești ===
On 13 February 2020, Răuță signed a one-and-a-half-year contract with Romanian club Petrolul Ploiești. On 20 January 2021, Răuță was released from the club after having his contract mutually terminated.

=== Universitatea Cluj ===
On 26 January 2021, Răuță joined Universitatea Cluj.
