= 2015–16 FC Dinamo București season =

FC Dinamo București
2015–16 season
- Manager: Mircea Rednic
- Liga I: 4th
- Cupa României: Finalist
- Cupa Ligii: Semifinals
- Top goalscorer: League: Harlem Gnohéré 12; All: Harlem Gnohéré 18
Home colours	Away colours	Third colours

The 2015–16 FC Dinamo București season is the 67th consecutive edition of competitive football by FC Dinamo București's in Liga I. Dinamo also competed in Cupa României and Cupa Ligii. Dinamo continued its insolvency status and was unable to buy any players, attracting only free agents and players on loan. In September, the Court announced that Dinamo fulfilled its bankruptcy obligations to exit insolvency.

On 22 November, Dinamo defeated its chief rival, Steaua, 3–1, following a gap from the last win four and a half years earlier.

On 6 May 2016, Patrick Ekeng came on as a second-half substitute in a televised match against Viitorul Constanța. He had been fatigued that day, and had told his best friend that he did not want to play. Seven minutes after his entrance, with his team leading 3–2, he collapsed. He was transported and resuscitated at the hospital, and within two hours the medical staff confirmed that he had died. The cause of death was a suspected heart attack. He was 26 years old. Nine days after his death, his funeral was held in his hometown, attended by past and present Cameroonian internationals and the nation's sports minister; Ekeng's brother said at the ceremony that he was comforted by his having led a selfless life.

After Ekeng's death, all matches in Romania that weekend were postponed, and Dinamo's cup final against CFR Cluj was moved a week later than scheduled. The club pledged that if they won the cup, the trophy would be brought to Cameroon and placed on Ekeng's grave. Before the final, 50,000 Dinamo fans made a display in honour of Ekeng, including a giant fabric image of him.

== Players ==
=== Squad changes ===
Transfers in:

No.	Pos.	Nat.	Name	Age	EU	Moving from	Type	Transfer window	Ends	Transfer fee	Source
8	MF	(Netherlands)	Ricky van Haaren	23	EU	ADO Den Haag (Netherlands)	Transfer	Summer	2017	Free	fcdinamo.ro
1	GK	(Lithuania)	Vytautas Černiauskas	26	EU	Korona Kielce (Poland)	Transfer	Summer	2016	Free	fcdinamo.ro
26	DF	(Cameroon)	Patrice Feussi	28	EU	ASA Târgu Mureș	Transfer	Summer	Undisclosed	Free	fcdinamo.ro
80	MF	(Croatia)	Aljoša Vojnović	29	EU	NK Osijek (Croatia)	Transfer	Summer	2016	Free	fcdinamo.ro
17	DF	(Slovenia)	Miha Mevlja	25	EU	Bnei Sakhnin (Israel)	Transfer	Summer	2017	Free	fcdinamo.ro
21	GK	(Romania)	Gabriel Abraham	24	EU	Oțelul Galați	Transfer	Summer	2019	Free	fcdinamo.ro
6	MF	(Bulgaria)	Orlin Starokin	28	EU	Lokomotiv Sofia (Bulgaria)	Transfer	Summer	Undisclosed	Free	fcdinamo.ro
31	FW	(France)	Harlem Gnohéré	27	EU	Petrolul Ploiești	Transfer	Summer	2017	Free	fcdinamo.ro
20	MF	(Croatia)	Antun Palić	27	EU	NK Krka (Slovenia)	Transfer	Summer	Undisclosed	Free	fcdinamo.ro
18	FW	(Cameroon)	Marcel Essombé	27	EU	Créteil (France)	Transfer	Summer	Undisclosed	Free	fcdinamo.ro
6	DF	(Croatia)	Ante Puljić	27	EU	Gent (Belgium)	Transfer	Summer	Undisclosed	Free	fcdinamo.ro
28	CM	(Romania)	Paul Anton	24	EU	Pandurii Târgu Jiu	Transfer	Summer	Undisclosed	Free	fcdinamo.ro
3	DF	(Cameroon)	Antonio Ghomsi	29	EU	Skoda Xanthi (Greece)	Transfer	Summer	Undisclosed	Free	fcdinamo.ro
90	CM	(Switzerland)	Gezim Shalaj	25	EU	Pandurii Târgu Jiu	Transfer	Summer	Undisclosed	Free	fcdinamo.ro
44	MF	(Romania)	Sergiu Hanca	23	EU	ASA Târgu Mureș	Transfer	Winter	Undisclosed	Undisclosed	fcdinamo.ro
12	GK	(Romania)	Victor Rîmniceanu	26	EU	Viitorul Constanța	Transfer	Winter	Undisclosed	Free	fcdinamo.ro
14	MF	(Cameroon)	Patrick Ekeng	23	EU	Córdoba (Spain)	Transfer	Winter	Undisclosed	Free	fcdinamo.ro
96	MF	(Romania)	Vlad Olteanu	19	EU	Brașov	Transfer	Winter	Undisclosed	Undisclosed	fcdinamo.ro
29	FW	(Romania)	Paul Batin	28	EU	Botoșani	Transfer	Winter	Undisclosed	Free	lpf.ro
21	MF	(Faroe Islands)	Kaj Leo í Bartalsstovu	24	EU	Levanger (Norway)	Transfer	Winter	Undisclosed	Undisclosed	fcdinamo.ro
22	LM	(Netherlands)	Romario Kortzorg	26	EU	ASA Târgu Mureș	Transfer	Winter	Undisclosed	Free	fcdinamo.ro
8	MF	(Romania)	Eric Bicfalvi	28	EU	Liaoning Whowin (China)	Transfer	Winter	2016	Free	fcdinamo.ro

Transfers out:

No.	Pos.	Nat.	Name	Age	EU	Moving to	Type	Transfer window	Transfer fee	Source
29	FW	(Romania)	Marius Niculae	34	EU		Retired	Summer		gsp.ro
3	DF	(Portugal)	Ricardo Machado	26	EU	Al-Taawon FC (Saudi Arabia)	Released	Summer		digisport.ro
18	MF	(Romania)	Marian Cristescu	30	EU	Concordia Chiajna	Released	Summer		digisport.ro
1	GK	(Romania)	Alexandru Marc	32	EU	CFR Cluj	Released	Summer		cfr1907.ro
5	MF	(Romania)	Nicolae Grigore	31	EU	FC Voluntari	Released	Summer		prosport.ro
22	DF	(Portugal)	Serginho	29	EU	Feirense (Portugal)	Released	Summer		prosport.ro
9	FW	(Poland)	Kamil Biliński	27	EU	Śląsk Wrocław (Poland)	Released	Summer		fcdinamo.ro
19	MF	(Senegal)	Boubacar Mansaly	27	Non-EU	Astra Giurgiu	Released	Summer		sptfm.ro
55	FW	(Romania)	Marius Alexe	25	EU	Karabükspor (Turkey)	Sold	Summer	Undisclosed	fcdinamo.ro
6	MF	(Bulgaria)	Orlin Starokin	28	EU	Botev Plovdiv (Bulgaria)	Released	Summer		fcdinamo.ro
3	DF	(Cameroon)	Antonio Ghomsi	29	EU		Released	Winter		mediafax.ro
8	MF	(Netherlands)	Ricky van Haaren	24	EU	Şanlıurfaspor (Turkey)	Released	Winter		fcdinamo.ro
80	MF	(Croatia)	Aljoša Vojnović	30	EU	Osijek (Croatia)	Released	Winter		fcdinamo.ro
90	CM	(Switzerland)	Gezim Shalaj	25	EU	Enosis Neon Paralimni (Cyprus)	Released	Winter		fcdinamo.ro
26	DF	(Cameroon)	Patrice Feussi	29	EU	Concordia Chiajna	Released	Winter		fcdinamo.ro
14	DF	(Cameroon)	Collins Fai	23		Standard Liège (Belgium)	Sold	Winter	Undisclosed	standard.be
10	MF	(Romania)	Cosmin Matei	24	EU	Atromitos (Greece)	Sold	Winter	100,000 €	atromitosfc.gr

Last updated: 2016-2-1

Loans out

Start date	End date	Position	No.	Player	To club	Fee	Ref.
18 August 2015	End of season	FW	19	Fabian Himcinschi	Dunărea Călărași	None	
2 September 2015	1 January 2016	MF	93	Valentin Lazăr	Concordia Chiajna	None	
24 January 2016	End of season	GK	41	Iustin Popescu	Petrolul Ploiești	None	
27 January 2016	End of season	FW	77	Bogdan Gavrilă	Petrolul Ploiești	None	
17 February 2016	End of season	MF	30	Andrei Tîrcoveanu	Gaz Metan Mediaș	None	

== Squad statistics ==
No.	Pos.	Player	League			Romanian Cup			League Cup		
No.	Pos.	Player	Apps	Starts	Goals	Apps	Starts	Goals	Apps	Starts	Goals
1	GK	(Lithuania) Černiauskas	34	34	0	4	4	0	1	1	0
5	DF	(Romania) Nedelcearu	21	14	0	5	4	1	2	2	0
6	DF	(Croatia) Puljić	21	14	1	6	6	1	1	1	0
7	DF	(Romania) Filip	26	26	2	2	2	0	2	2	0
8	MF	(Romania) Bicfalvi	7	6	1	2	1	1	1	0	0
9	MF	(Romania) Rotariu	32	28	8	5	5	1	3	1	1
10	FW	(France) Gnohéré	31	18	12	6	6	5	4	2	1
12	GK	(Romania) Rîmniceanu	0	0	0	0	0	0	1	1	0
13	MF	(Romania) Petre	3	0	1	1	1	0	1	0	0
14	MF	(Cameroon) Ekeng	10	6	0	1	1	1	1	1	0
17	DF	(Slovenia) Mevlja	35	34	0	6	6	0	4	4	0
18	FW	(Cameroon) Essombé	23	15	6	2	0	0	4	3	1
20	MF	(Croatia) Palić	28	23	4	5	5	1	3	3	1
21	MF	(Faroe Islands) Bartalsstovu	6	1	0	1	0	0	1	1	0
22	MF	(Netherlands) Kortzorg	9	8	1	3	2	0	1	1	0
23	DF	(Romania) Șerban	8	6	0	1	1	0	0	0	0
24	MF	(Romania) Costache	4	1	1	0	0	0	1	1	0
28	MF	(Romania) Anton	23	22	2	4	3	0	4	2	0
29	FW	(Romania) Batin	3	1	0	0	0	0	1	0	0
41	GK	(Romania) Muțiu	1	1	0	0	0	0	0	0	0
44	DF	(Romania) Hanca	11	11	0	3	3	0	1	1	0
70	MF	(Romania) Manole	0	0	0	1	0	0	0	0	0
73	DF	(Romania) Marc	26	22	3	1	0	0	3	3	0
93	MF	(Romania) Lazăr	7	4	0	3	1	0	1	1	0
94	DF	(Romania) Corbu	2	2	0	2	1	0	1	1	0
96	MF	(Romania) Olteanu	9	6	0	1	1	0	2	2	0
99	FW	(Romania) Moldoveanu	2	0	0	1	1	0	0	0	0
Players retired, sold or loaned out during the season
3	DF	(Cameroon) Ghomsi	4	2	0	1	1	0	0	0	0
6	MF	(Bulgaria) Starokin	1	1	0	0	0	0	0	0	0
8	MF	(Netherlands) van Haaren	8	4	0	1	0	0	1	0	0
10	MF	(Romania) Matei	19	18	2	2	1	0	2	2	0
14	DF	(Cameroon) Fai	21	19	0	3	3	0	2	2	0
19	FW	(Romania) Himcinschi	1	0	0	0	0	0	0	0	0
26	DF	(Cameroon) Feussi	11	9	0	1	1	0	1	1	0
30	MF	(Romania) Tîrcoveanu	3	1	0	1	1	0	0	0	0
41	GK	(Romania) Popescu	1	1	0	2	2	0	2	2	0
55	MF	(Romania) Alexe	1	1	0	0	0	0	0	0	0
77	FW	(Romania) Gavrilă	16	11	0	2	1	0	2	1	0
80	FW	(Croatia) Vojnović	19	18	0	3	1	1	2	2	0
90	MF	(Switzerland) Shalaj	7	1	0	0	0	0	0	0	0

== Disciplinary record ==
Includes all competitive matches.

No.	Pos	Player	Liga I			Cupa României			Cupa Ligii		
No.	Pos	Player	Yellow card	(yellow card) (yellow-red card)	Red card	Yellow card	(yellow card) (yellow-red card)	Red card	Yellow card	(yellow card) (yellow-red card)	Red card
1	GK	Vytautas Černiauskas	2	0	0	0	0	0	0	0	0
5	DF	Ionuț Nedelcearu	11	0	0	3	0	0	0	0	0
6	DF	Puljić	3	0	0	1	0	0	0	0	0
7	DF	Steliano Filip	11	1	2	0	0	0	1	0	0
9	MF	Dorin Rotariu	5	0	0	0	0	0	0	0	0
10	FW	Harlem Gnohéré	7	0	0	1	0	0	1	0	0
17	DF	Miha Mevlja	3	0	1	0	0	0	0	0	0
18	FW	Marcel Essombé	2	0	0	0	0	0	0	0	0
20	MF	Antun Palić	8	0	0	0	0	0	0	0	0
20	MF	Romario Kortzorg	1	1	0	1	0	0	0	0	0
23	MF	Ionuț Șerban	3	0	0	0	0	0	0	0	0
24	MF	Valentin Costache	1	0	0	0	0	0	0	0	0
28	MF	Paul Anton	3	0	1	1	0	0	1	0	0
44	DF	Sergiu Hanca	5	0	0	1	0	0	0	0	0
73	DF	Andrei Marc	9	1	0	0	0	0	0	0	0
93	MF	Valentin Lazăr	1	0	0	0	0	0	0	0	0
94	DF	Laurențiu Corbu	0	0	0	1	0	0	0	0	0
96	MF	Vlad Olteanu	3	0	0	1	0	0	0	0	0
Players retired, sold or loaned out during the season
3	DF	Antonio Ghomsi	0	0	0	1	0	0	0	0	0
8	MF	Ricky van Haaren	1	0	0	0	0	0	0	0	0
10	MF	Cosmin Matei	4	0	1	0	0	0	0	0	0
14	DF	Collins Fai	5	0	0	1	0	0	1	0	0
26	DF	Patrice Feussi	4	1	0	0	0	0	0	0	0
77	FW	Bogdan Gavrilă	0	0	0	0	0	0	1	0	0
80	FW	Aljoša Vojnović	5	0	0	0	0	0	0	0	0

== Competitions ==
=== Liga I ===
==== Regular season ====
Overall								Home						Away					
Pld	W	D	L	GF	GA	GD	Pts	W	D	L	GF	GA	GD	W	D	L	GF	GA	GD
26	13	9	4	36	24	+12	48	9	1	3	21	12	+9	4	8	1	15	12	+3

Last updated: 28 February 2016.
Source: Competitive Matches

===== Table =====
Pos	Team	Pld	W	D	L	GF	GA	GD	Pts	Qualification
1	Astra Giurgiu	26	14	9	3	42	29	+13	51	Qualification for the championship round
2	Dinamo București	26	13	9	4	36	24	+12	48	Qualification for the championship round
3	Pandurii Târgu Jiu	26	13	8	5	35	26	+9	47	Qualification for the championship round
4	Viitorul Constanța	26	13	7	6	49	30	+19	46	Qualification for the championship round
5	Steaua București	26	12	8	6	35	25	+10	44	Qualification for the championship round

Source: Liga 1, Soccerway
Rules for classification: 1) Points; 2) Head-to-head points; 3) Head-to-head goal difference; 4) Head-to-head goals scored; 5) Goal difference; 6) Goals scored; 7) Play-off.

===== Results by round =====
Round	1	2	3	4	5	6	7	8	9	10	11	12	13	14	15	16	17	18	19	20	21	22	23	24	25	26
Ground	A	H	A	H	A	H	A	H	A	H	A	A	H	H	A	H	A	H	A	H	A	H	A	H	H	A
Result	D	W	D	W	D	W	D	W	D	L	D	W	L	W	L	L	W	W	W	D	W	W	D	W	W	D
Position	7	4	4	3	3	1	2	3	2	4	5	4	5	5	5	6	5	5	4	4	4	3	3	2	2	2

Updated to match(es) played on 28 February 2016. Source: Competitive Matches
A = Away; H = Home; W = Win; D = Draw; L = Loss

==== Championship round ====
Overall								Home						Away					
Pld	W	D	L	GF	GA	GD	Pts	W	D	L	GF	GA	GD	W	D	L	GF	GA	GD
10	2	6	2	12	15	−3	12	1	3	1	7	9	−2	1	3	1	5	6	−1

Last updated: 6 May 2016.
Source: Competitive Matches

===== Table =====
Pos	Team	Pld	W	D	L	GF	GA	GD	Pts	Qualification
1	Astra Giurgiu (C)	10	7	1	2	20	9	+11	48	Qualification for the Champions League third qualifying round
2	Steaua București	10	6	3	1	18	8	+10	43	Qualification for the Champions League third qualifying round
3	Pandurii Târgu Jiu	10	3	6	1	12	7	+5	39	Qualification for the Europa League third qualifying round
4	Dinamo București (Note: Dinamo București failed to obtain a UEFA licence after filing for insolvency in 2014.)	10	2	6	2	12	15	−3	36	
5	Viitorul Constanța	10	1	3	6	14	21	−7	29	Qualification for the Europa League third qualifying round
6	Târgu Mureș (Note: On 31 March 2016, the Adjudicatory Chamber of the UEFA Club Financial Control Body (CFCB) announced that Târgu Mureș will be excluded from participating in the next UEFA club competition for which they would otherwise qualify in the next three seasons (i.e. the 2016/17, 2017/18 and 2018/19 seasons).)	10	0	3	7	8	24	−16	22	

Source: Soccerway
Rules for classification: 1) Points.
(C) Champions

===== Results by round =====
Round	1	2	3	4	5	6	7	8	9	10
Ground	H	A	H	H	A	A	H	A	A	H
Result	D	D	D	L	W	D	W	D	L	D
Position	3	4	4	3	3	4	4	4	4	4

Updated to match(es) played on 6 May 2016. Source: Competitive Matches
A = Away; H = Home; W = Win; D = Draw; L = Loss

=== Competitive ===
==== Liga I ====
Kickoff times are in EET.

12 July Round 1	ASA Târgu Mureș	0–0	Dinamo București	Târgu Mureș
21:00	Balić (yellow card) 32'	Report	Feussi (yellow card) 37'; Matei (yellow card) 57'; Fai (yellow card) 84'; Nedelcearu (yellow card) 90+4'	Stadium: Trans-Sil; Attendance: 4,000; Referee: George Găman (Craiova)

17 July Round 2	Dinamo București	1–0	Universitatea Craiova	Bucharest
21:00	Rotariu 86'; Feussi (yellow card) 69'; Marc (yellow card) 75'; Lazăr (yellow card) 90+4'	Report	Ferfelea (yellow card) 64'; Băluță (yellow card) 72'	Stadium: Dinamo; Attendance: 4,184; Referee: Istvan Kovacs (Carei)

25 July Round 3	Viitorul Constanța	1–1	Dinamo București	Ovidiu
18:30	Marin 46'; Benzar (yellow card) 48'; Tănase (yellow card) 58'; Marin (yellow card) 65'	Report	Petre 78'; Vojnović (yellow card) 38'	Stadium: Viitorul; Attendance: 4,000; Referee: Robert Dumitru (Brașov)

3 August Round 4	Dinamo București	2–1	Poli Timișoara	Bucharest
21:00	Matei 5' (pen.); Gnohéré 43'; Matei (yellow card) 45+2'; Vojnović (yellow card) 51'; Filip (yellow card) 90+3'	Report	Elek 8'; D.Popescu (yellow card) 31'; Zicu (yellow card) 42'; Belu (yellow card) 81'; Rufino (yellow card) 82'	Stadium: Dinamo; Attendance: 3,927; Referee: Marius Avram (Bucharest)

9 August Round 5	Steaua București	0–0	Dinamo București	Bucharest
21:00	Hamroun (yellow card) 43'	Report	Fai (yellow card) 32'; Vojnović (yellow card) 70'; Černiauskas (yellow card) 90+2'	Stadium: Arena Națională; Attendance: 27,252; Referee: Ovidiu Hațegan (Arad)

13 August Round 6	Dinamo București	3–0	FC Voluntari	Bucharest
21:00	Filip 33'; Matei 55'; Rotariu 63'; Fai (yellow card) 35'; Mevlja (yellow card) 40'; Filip (yellow card) 69'	Report	Maftei (yellow card) 35'; Novaković (yellow card) 37'; Pîrvulescu (yellow card) 72'	Stadium: Dinamo; Attendance: 2,972; Referee: Florin Mihai Marcu (Oradea)

16 August Round 7	CSMS Iași	0–0	Dinamo București	Iași
21:00	Voicu (yellow card) 61'; Ciucă (yellow card) 90'	Report	Marc (red card) 90'	Stadium: Emil Alexandrescu; Attendance: 4,000; Referee: Adrian Comănescu (Râmnicu Vâlcea)

22 August Round 8	Dinamo București	2–0	Petrolul Ploiești	Bucharest
21:00	Essombé 19'; Gnohéré 73'; Palić (yellow card) 72'; Gnohéré (yellow card) 74'; Rotariu (yellow card) 81'; Feussi (yellow card) 86'	Report	Rippert (yellow card) 38' (yellow-red card) 90'; Ropotan (yellow card) 57'; Zoubir (yellow card) 66'	Stadium: Dinamo; Attendance: 2,755; Referee: George Găman (Craiova)

29 August Round 9	Pandurii Târgu Jiu	2–2	Dinamo București	Drobeta-Turnu Severin
21:00	Filipetto 66'; Hora 80'; Ungurușan (yellow card) 25'; Hora (yellow card) 58'; Nistor (yellow card) 88'; Vasco Fernandes (yellow card) 89'; Ciucur (yellow card) 90+5'	Report	Essombé 35'; Gnohéré 90+4'; Nedelcearu (yellow card) 17'; Fai (yellow card) 49'; Palić (yellow card) 64'	Stadium: Municipal; Attendance: 4,000; Referee: Lucian Ruşandu (Sfântu Gheorghe)

14 September Round 10	Dinamo București	0–2	CFR Cluj	Bucharest
21:00	Feussi (yellow card) 1' (yellow-red card) 40'; Filip (yellow card) 41' (yellow-red card) 54'; Matei (red card) 88'	Report	Cristian López 41' (pen.); Voiculeț 77'; Goian (yellow card) 6'	Stadium: Dinamo; Attendance: 4,427; Referee: Radu Petrescu (Bucharest)

20 September Round 11	FC Botoșani	1–1	Dinamo București	Botoșani
21:00	Cabrera 27'; Fülöp (yellow card) 11'; Costin (yellow card) 39'; Patache (yellow card) 80'	Report	Essombé 45+2'; Șerban (yellow card) 19'; Marc (yellow card) 82'	Stadium: Municipal; Attendance: 3,000; Referee: Istvan Kovacs (Carei)

28 September Round 12	Concordia Chiajna	1–3	Dinamo București	Chiajna
21:00	Pena 90+3'; Constantinescu (yellow card) 64'; Giurgiu (yellow card) 86'	Report	Rotariu 34'; Gnohéré 40', 66'; Vojnović (yellow card) 58'; Marc (yellow card) 84'; Nedelcearu (yellow card) 88'; Filip (yellow card) 90+3'	Stadium: Concordia; Attendance: 1,500; Referee: Alexandru Tudor (Bucharest)

3 October Round 13	Dinamo București	0–1	Astra Giurgiu	Bucharest
18:30	Matei (yellow card) 13' van Haaren (yellow card) 47'; Rotariu (yellow card) 61'; Anton (yellow card) 66'; Filip (yellow card) 81'; Nedelcearu (yellow card) 84'	Report	Teixeira 83'; Teixeira (yellow card) 19'; Queirós (yellow card) 42'	Stadium: Arena Națională; Attendance: 20,360; Referee: Ovidiu Hațegan (Arad)

17 October Round 14	Dinamo București	2–1	ASA Târgu Mureș	Bucharest
20:30	Marc 41', 56'; Palić (yellow card) 18'; Mevlja (yellow card) 57'; Rotariu (yellow card) 68'	Report	N'Doye 50'; Manolov (yellow card) 9'; Romario (yellow card) 39'; Bejan (yellow card) 55' (yellow-red card) 81'; Velayos (yellow card) 57'; Viciu (yellow card) 70'; Brandán (yellow card) 79'	Stadium: Dinamo; Attendance: 2,372; Referee: Cristian Balaj (Baia Mare)

25 October Round 15	Universitatea Craiova	3–0	Dinamo București	Craiova
15:00	Bawab 13', 63'; Bancu 65'; Nuno Rocha (yellow card) 48'	Report	Filip (yellow card) 45'; Rotariu (yellow card) 52'; Anton (red card) 90+3'	Stadium: Extensiv; Attendance: 5,000; Referee: Istvan Kovacs (Carei)

2 November Round 16	Dinamo București	1–5	Viitorul Constanța	Bucharest
20:30	Gnohéré 53'; Nedelcearu (yellow card) 12'; Mevlja (red card) 31'; Șerban (yellow card) 62'; Filip (yellow card) 73'	Report	Tănase 32' (pen.); Achim 64', 90+1'; Aganović 86', 90+2'; Filip (yellow card) 58'; Boli (yellow card) 82'	Stadium: Dinamo; Attendance: 2,500; Referee: Cătălin Popa (Pitești)

7 November Round 17	Poli Timișoara	0–1	Dinamo București	Timișoara
20:30	Neagu (yellow card) 57'; Croitoru (yellow card) 70'; Hernández (yellow card) 79'; Belu-Iordache (yellow card) 89'	Report	Essombé 55'; Marc (yellow card) 28'; Nedelcearu (yellow card) 39'; Matei (yellow card) 46'; Fai (yellow card) 50'	Stadium: Dan Păltinișanu; Attendance: 4,000; Referee: Horațiu Feșnic (Cluj-Napoca)

22 November Round 18	Dinamo București	3–1	Steaua București	Bucharest
20:30	Varela 55' (o.g.); Palić 67'; Gnohéré 84'; Vojnović (yellow card) 59'; Palić (yellow card) 87'; Gnohéré (yellow card) 90+3'	Report	Stanciu 90+2'; Breeveld (yellow card) 28'; Râpă (yellow card) 44'; Tudorie (yellow card) 65'; Enceanu (yellow card) 79'	Stadium: Dinamo; Attendance: 10,488; Referee: Cristian Balaj (Baia Mare)

30 November Round 19	FC Voluntari	1–3	Dinamo București	Bucharest
20:30	Spahija 65'; A.Bălan (yellow card) 30'; Koné (yellow card) 79' (yellow-red card) 90+1'; Briceag (yellow card) 88'	Report	Gnohéré 1'; Filip 40'; Anton 60'; Nedelcearu (yellow card) 44'; Essombé (yellow card) 87'	Stadium: Dinamo; Attendance: 1,000; Referee: Andrei Chivulete (Bucharest)

3 December Round 20	Dinamo București	0–0	CSMS Iași	Bucharest
20:30	Filip (yellow card) 65'; Anton (yellow card) 79'; Gnohéré (yellow card) 87'	Report	Crețu (yellow card) 43'; Grahovac (yellow card) 45'; Grigorie (yellow card) 46'; Ciucă (yellow card) 89'	Stadium: Dinamo; Attendance: 1,582; Referee: Iulian Călin (Ștefănești)

7 December Round 21	Petrolul Ploiești	1–2	Dinamo București	Ploiești
20:30	Moussa 20'; Varga (yellow card) 23'; Moussa (yellow card) 24'; Bucșa (yellow card) 33'; Genev (yellow card) 90'	Report	Tudose 52' (o.g.); Rotariu 84'; Gnohéré (yellow card) 8'; Marc (yellow card) 23'; Černiauskas (yellow card) 90+2'; Rotariu (yellow card) 90+3'	Stadium: Ilie Oană; Attendance: 3,500; Referee: Adrian Comănescu (Râmnicu Vâlcea)

12 December Round 22	Dinamo București	2–1	Pandurii Târgu Jiu	Bucharest
20:30	Essombé 39'; Puljić 90+1'; Marc (yellow card) 58'; Filip (yellow card) 65'; Palić (yellow card) 69'; Nedelcearu (yellow card) 79'; Puljić (yellow card) 90+5'	Report	Munteanu 63'; Droppa (yellow card) 77' (yellow-red card) 86'; Filipetto (yellow card) 90+7'	Stadium: Dinamo; Attendance: 2,083; Referee: Marcel Bîrsan (Bucharest)

20 December Round 23	CFR Cluj	1–1	Dinamo București	Cluj-Napoca
20:30	Jakoliš 10'; Larie (yellow card) 30'; Jakoliš (yellow card) 54'; Mureșan (yellow card) 59'; Dani (yellow card) 68'	Report	Palić 20'; Filip (yellow card) 19'; Puljić (yellow card) 51'; Nedelcearu (yellow card) 60'; Anton (yellow card) 75'	Stadium: Dr. Constantin Rădulescu; Attendance: 3,500; Referee: Marius Avram (Bucharest)

14 February Round 24	Dinamo București	1–0	FC Botoșani	Bucharest
19:00	Costache 27'; Costache (yellow card) 28'; Gnohéré (yellow card) 44'	Report	Dimitrov (yellow card) 25'; Popovici (yellow card) 40'; Vașvari (yellow card) 61'; Ivanovici (yellow card) 72'; Casado (yellow card) 80'; Martinus (yellow card) 82'; Ngadeu (yellow card) 90'	Stadium: Dinamo; Attendance: 4,125; Referee: Sebastian Colţescu (Craiova)

20 February Round 25	Dinamo București	4–0	Concordia Chiajna	Bucharest
20:30	Rotariu 13' (pen.); Essombé 45+1', 61'; Gnohéré 85'; Hanca (yellow card) 10'; Lazăr (yellow card) 47'	Report	Mamele (yellow card) 12'; Feussi (yellow card) 21'; Serediuc (yellow card) 51'	Stadium: Dinamo; Attendance: 3,833; Referee: Alexandru Tudor (Bucharest)

28 February Round 26	Astra Giurgiu	1–1	Dinamo București	Giurgiu
20:30	Florea 69'; Boudjemaa (yellow card) 23'; Teixeira (yellow card) 53'; Mansaly (yellow card) 59'; Oroș (yellow card) 83'	Report	Rotariu 62'; Palić (yellow card) 28'; Filip (red card) 40'; Olteanu (yellow card) 45+2'; Hanca (yellow card) 48'	Stadium: Marin Anastasovici; Attendance: 8,000; Referee: Marcel Bîrsan (Bucharest)

6 March Play-Off Round 1	Dinamo București	1–1	Steaua București	Bucharest
20:30	Bicfalvi 81'; Filip (red card) 85'	Report	Hamroun 10'; Pintilii (yellow card) 7'; Chipciu (yellow card) 17'; Muniru (yellow card) 71'; Hamroun (yellow card) 85' (yellow-red card) 86'	Stadium: Dinamo; Attendance: 10,288; Referee: Ovidiu Hațegan (Arad)

14 March Play-Off Round 2	ASA Târgu Mureș	0–0	Dinamo București	Târgu Mureș
20:30	Mureșan (yellow card) 76'; Jazvić (yellow card) 77'; Gorobsov (red card) 79'	Report	Hanca (yellow card) 64'	Stadium: Trans-Sil; Referee: Lucian Rusandu (Sfântu Gheorghe)

20 March Play-Off Round 3	Dinamo București	1–1	Pandurii Târgu Jiu	Bucharest
20:30	Palić 38'; Palić (yellow card) 27'; Mevlja (yellow card) 31'; Hanca (yellow card) 90+3'	Report	Hora 89'; Ropotan (yellow card) 27'; Răduț (yellow card) 83'; Săpunaru (yellow card) 90+1'; Nicoară (red card) 90+3'	Stadium: Dinamo; Attendance: 3,368; Referee: Cristian Balaj (Baia Mare)

1 April Play-Off Round 4	Dinamo București	1–4	Astra Giurgiu	Bucharest
20:30	Anton 38'; Palić (yellow card) 76'	Report	Boudjemaa 17'; Alibec 35', 53', 67'	Stadium: Arena Națională; Attendance: 10,383; Referee: Radu Petrescu (Bucharest)

4 April Play-Off Round 5	Viitorul Constanța	1–2	Dinamo București	Ovidiu
20:30	Tănase 7'	Report	Kortzorg 25'; Lazăr 71'; Nedelcearu (yellow card) 60'; Lazăr (yellow card) 75'; Olteanu (yellow card) 89'	Stadium: Viitorul; Attendance: 4,500; Referee: Istvan Kovacs (Carei)

10 April Play-Off Round 6	Steaua București	1–1	Dinamo București	Bucharest
20:30	Filip 16' (o.g.); Hamroun (yellow card) 45+1' (yellow-red card) 90+1'	Report	Gnohéré 48'; Gnohéré (yellow card) 65'; Filip (yellow card) 75'; Hanca (yellow card) 90+2'; Nedelcearu (yellow card) 90+3'	Stadium: Arena Națională; Attendance: 48,632; Referee: Alexandru Tudor (Bucharest)

17 April Play-Off Round 7	Dinamo București	1–0	ASA Târgu Mureș	Bucharest
20:30	Rotariu 52'	Report	Balaur (red card) 52'	Stadium: Arena Națională; Attendance: 5,482; Referee: Adrian Cojocaru (Galați)

24 April Play-Off Round 8	Pandurii Târgu Jiu	0–0	Dinamo București	Drobeta-Turnu Severin
20:30		Report	Palić (yellow card) 24'; Kortzorg (yellow card) 28' (yellow-red card) 67'; Gnohéré (yellow card) 51'; Marc (yellow card) 90+3'	Stadium: Municipal; Attendance: 1,000; Referee: Alexandru Tudor (Bucharest)

2 May Play-Off Round 9	Astra Giurgiu	4–2	Dinamo București	Giurgiu
20:30	Júnior Morais 31'; Alibec 48'; Ioniță 56', 64'	Report	Palić 16'; Lazăr 42'	Stadium: Marin Anastasovici; Attendance: 7,000; Referee: Cristian Balaj (Baia Mare)

6 May Play-Off Round 10	Dinamo București	3–3	Viitorul Constanța	Bucharest
20:30	Gnohéré 7', 49' (pen.); Rotariu 55'; Șerban (yellow card) 30'; Marc (yellow card) 33'; Olteanu (yellow card) 66'	Report	Marin 10'; Tănase 33' (pen.); Mățan 84' (pen.)	Stadium: Dinamo; Attendance: 2,871; Referee: Florin Mihai Marcu (Oradea)

==== Cupa României ====
24 September Round of 32	Dacia Unirea Brăila	2–3	Dinamo București	Brăila
16:30	Necoară 40' (pen.); Muscă 85'	Report	Gnohéré 63', 73', 75'; Ghomsi (yellow card) 40'; Nedelcearu (yellow card) 52'	Stadium: Municipal; Attendance: 7,000; Referee: Adrian Cojocaru (Galați)

28 October Round of 16	Pandurii Târgu Jiu	2–3	Dinamo București	Drobeta-Turnu Severin
20:30	Hora 13'; Nedelcearu 31' (o.g.); Grecu (yellow card) 89'	Report	Nedelcearu 8'; Rotariu 51'; Vojnović 90'; Fai (yellow card) 39'	Stadium: Municipal; Attendance: 1,500; Referee: Ovidiu Hațegan (Arad)

16 December QF	Dinamo București	2–1	Astra Giurgiu	Bucharest
20:30	Gnohéré 17'; Palić 90+4'; Anton (yellow card) 68'; Corbu (yellow card) 80'	Report	Enache 90+1'; Júnior Morais (yellow card) 80'; Enache (yellow card) 90+5'	Stadium: Dinamo; Attendance: 6,438; Referee: Horațiu Feșnic (Cluj-Napoca)

3 March SF Leg 1	Dinamo București	0–0	Steaua București	Bucharest
20:30	Nedelcearu (yellow card) 28'; Olteanu (yellow card) 44'; Gnohéré (yellow card) 59'	Report	Râpă (yellow card) 24'; Bourceanu (yellow card) 35'	Stadium: Dinamo; Attendance: 13,177; Referee: Radu Petrescu (Bucharest)

20 April SF Leg 2	Steaua București	2–2 (2–2 agg.)	Dinamo București	Bucharest
21:30	Enache 17'; Bourceanu (red card) 43'; Chipciu 52' (yellow card) 90+4'	Summary	Ekeng 51'; Puljić 75' (yellow card) 83'	Stadium: Arena Națională; Attendance: 25,000; Referee: Cristian Balaj (Baia Mare)

17 May 2016 Final	Dinamo București	2–2 (a.e.t.) (4–5 p)	CFR Cluj	Bucharest
21:30	Gnohéré 23' (pen.); Hanca (yellow card) 33'; Bicfalvi 36'; Kortzorg (yellow card) 67'; Nedelcearu (yellow card) 90+5'	Summary	Mureșan (yellow card) 23'; Juan Carlos 47'; Tiago Lopes (yellow card) 70'; Nouvier (yellow card) 79'; Petrucci (yellow card) 86'; Cristian López 89'; Jakoliš (yellow card) 119'	Stadium: Arena Națională; Attendance: 40,000; Referee: Ovidiu Hațegan (Arad)

==== Cupa Ligii ====
10 September Round of 16	Pandurii Târgu Jiu	0–2	Dinamo București	Drobeta-Turnu Severin
21:45	Grecu (yellow card) 40'; Vasco (yellow card) 69'; Momčilović (yellow card) 78'; Răduț (yellow card) 81'; Nistor (yellow card) 90+1'	Report	Palić 60'; Filipetto 62' (o.g.); Filip (yellow card) 31'; Gavrilă (yellow card) 38'; Fai (yellow card) 73'; Gnohéré (yellow card) 90'	Stadium: Municipal; Referee: Alexandru Tudor (Bucharest)

14 October QF	Dinamo București	2–0	CFR Cluj	Bucharest
21:00	Essombé 22'; Rotariu 55'; Anton (yellow card) 87'	Report	Cristian López (yellow card) 56'	Stadium: Dinamo; Attendance: 1,874; Referee: Alexandru Tudor (Bucharest)

10 March SF Leg 1	Concordia Chiajna	3–0	Dinamo București	Chiajna
18:00	Milevskyi 5'; Obodo 52'; Pena 88'; Milevskyi (yellow card) 61'	Report		Stadium: Concordia; Referee: Adrian Cojocaru (Galați)

14 April SF Leg 2	Dinamo București	1–1 (1–4 agg.)	Concordia Chiajna	Bucharest
19:00	Gnohéré 14'; Olteanu (red card) 25'	Summary	Bălgrădean (yellow card) 11'; Giurgiu (yellow card) 70' (yellow-red card); Bucurică 77'; Cristea (yellow card) 88'	Stadium: Dinamo; Attendance: 1,574; Referee: George Găman (Craiova)

== Non competitive matches ==
19 June Friendly	Verbania	2–10	Dinamo București	Verbania
		Report	Ionuț Șerban, Marius Alexe (2), Patrick Petre (2), Robert Moldoveanu, Bogdan Gavrilă, Fabian Himcinschi (2), Fai Collins	Stadium: Stadio Comunale

21 June Friendly	Gozzano	0–7	Dinamo București	Verbania
		Report	Robert Moldoveanu (2), Steliano Filip, Mihai Popescu, Cosmin Matei, Bogdan Gavrilă, Fabian Himcinschi	Stadium: Stadio Fondotoce

24 June Friendly	Dinamo București	3–1	FC Chiasso	Verbania
	Ionuț Șerban, Dorin Rotariu, Cosmin Matei	Report		Stadium: Stadio Comunale

2 July Friendly	Dinamo București	10–1	USD Ornavassese	Stresa
	Lazăr (4), Moldoveanu (2), Van Haaren, Matei, Nedelcearu, Petre	Report		Stadium: Stadio Comunale Luigi Forlano

22 January Friendly	Dinamo București	1–1	Shijiazhuang	Pyrgos
	Mulenga o.g.	Report	Rondón

26 January Friendly	Dinamo București	1–1	Aris Limassol	Germasogeia
	Hanca	Report	Marco Aurelio	Stadium: Municipal Stadium

28 January Friendly	Dinamo București	1–1	FC Ural	Pyrgos
	?	Report	Manucharyan

2 February Friendly	Dinamo București	1–0	Ruch Chorzów	Pyrgos
	Essombe	Report
