= List of Romanian football transfers summer 2015 =

This is a list of Romanian football transfers for the summer 2015 transfer windows. Only moves featuring at least one Liga I club are listed.

== Transfers ==
=== Summer window ===
Date	Name	Country	From/Last Club	Moving to	Fee
5 June 2015	Plamen Iliev	Bulgaria	(Bulgaria) Levski Sofia	Botoșani	Free
5 June 2015	Serginho	Portugal	Dinamo București	(Portugal) Feirense	Free
6 June 2015	Apostol Popov	Bulgaria	(Bulgaria) CSKA Sofia	Universitatea Craiova	Free
6 June 2015	Neluț Roșu	Romania	Concordia Chiajna	Cluj	Free
9 June 2015	Sanaa Altama	Chad	Oțelul Galați	Petrolul Ploiești	Free
9 June 2015	Jérémy Faug-Porret	France	Botoșani	Petrolul Ploiești	Free
9 June 2015	Ismail Ahmed Kadar Hassan	Djibouti	(France) Épinal	Petrolul Ploiești	Free
11 June 2015	Jean Sony Alcénat	Haiti	Petrolul Ploiești	Steaua București	Free
14 June 2015	Ricardo Machado	Portugal	Dinamo București	(Saudi Arabia) Al-Taawoun	Free
16 June 2015	Marian Cristescu	Romania	Dinamo București	Concordia Chiajna	Free
17 June 2015	Ricky van Haaren	Netherlands	(Netherlands) ADO Den Haag	Dinamo București	Free
18 June 2015	Vytautas Černiauskas	Lithuania	(Poland) Korona Kielce	Dinamo București	Free
18 June 2015	Sulley Muniru	Ghana	Cluj	Steaua București	Free
19 June 2015	Cristian López	Spain	(Spain) Burgos	Cluj	Free
20 June 2015	Patrice Feussi	Cameroon	Târgu Mureș	Dinamo București	Free
23 June 2015	Fernando Boldrin	Brazil	Concordia Chiajna	Astra Giurgiu	Free
24 June 2015	Aljoša Vojnović	Croatia	(Croatia) Osijek	Dinamo București	Free
25 June 2015	Boubacar Mansaly	Senegal	Dinamo București	Astra Giurgiu	Free
26 June 2015	Kamil Biliński	Poland	Dinamo București	(Poland) Śląsk Wrocław	Free
26 June 2015	Miha Mevlja	Slovenia	(Israel) Bnei Sakhnin	Dinamo București	Free
4 July 2015	Pedro Queirós	Portugal	(Portugal) Vitória Setúbal	Astra Giurgiu	Free
8 July 2015	Gabriel Abraham	Romania	Oțelul Galați	Dinamo București	Free
9 July 2015	Steve Leo Beleck	Cameroon	(Italy) Fiorentina	Cluj	Loan
11 July 2015	Orlin Starokin	Bulgaria	(Bulgaria) Lokomotiv Sofia	Dinamo București	Free
16 July 2015	Harlem Gnohéré	France	(Belgium) Mons	Dinamo București	Free
21 July 2015	Alexandru Mitriță	Romania	Viitorul Constanța	(Italy) Pescara	Undisclosed
22 July 2015	Marius Alexe	Romania	Dinamo București	(Turkey) Karabükspor	Undisclosed
27 July 2015	Nicolae Grigore	Romania	Dinamo București	Voluntari	Free
10 August 2015	Antun Palić	Croatia	(Slovenia) Krka	Dinamo București	Free
11 August 2015	Marcel Essombé	Cameroon	(France) Créteil	Dinamo București	Free
18 August 2015	Fabian Himcinschi	Romania	Dinamo București	Dunărea Călărași	Loan
18 August 2015	Orlin Starokin	Bulgaria	Dinamo București	(Bulgaria) Botev Plovdiv	Free
21 August 2015	Ninos Gouriye	Netherlands	(Netherlands) ADO Den Haag	Astra Giurgiu	Free
21 August 2015	Ante Puljić	Croatia	(Belgium) Genk	Dinamo București	Free
31 August 2015	Mihai Roman	Romania	Pandurii Târgu Jiu	(Netherlands) N.E.C	€350,000
2 September 2015	Valentin Lazăr	Romania	Dinamo București	Concordia Chiajna	Loan
7 September 2015	Paul Anton	Romania	Pandurii Târgu Jiu	Dinamo București	Free
7 September 2015	Viktor Genev	Bulgaria	(Scotland) St Mirren	Petrolul Ploiești	Free
8 September 2015	Costinel Gugu	Romania	Târgu Mureș	(France) Le Havre	Free
11 September 2015	Antonio Ghomsi	Cameroon	(Greece) Skoda Xanthi	Dinamo București	Free
9 October 2015	Gezim Shalaj	Switzerland	Pandurii Târgu Jiu	Dinamo București	Free
