= 2016–17 FC Dinamo București season =

FC Dinamo București
2016–17 season
- Head coach: Ioan Andone (until 14 February); Cosmin Contra (from 17 February)
- Liga I: 3rd
- Cupa României: QF
- Cupa Ligii: Winners
- Top goalscorer: Adam Nemec 11
Home colours	Away colours	Third colours

The 2016–17 FC Dinamo București season is the 68th consecutive edition of competitive football by FC Dinamo București's in Liga I. Dinamo won Cupa Ligii for the first time in history.

== Players ==
=== Squad changes ===
Transfers in:

No.	Pos.	Nat.	Name	Age	EU	Moving from	Type	Transfer window	Ends	Transfer fee	Source
	MF	(Argentina)	Maximiliano Oliva	26		ACS Poli Timișoara	Transfer	Summer		Free	
	GK	(Panama)	Jaime Penedo	34		Deportivo Saprissa (Costa Rica)	Transfer	Summer		Free	
	DF	(Spain)	José Romera	28	EU	FK Jablonec (Czech Republic)	Transfer	Summer		Free	
	FW	(Romania)	Daniel Popa	20	EU	Chindia Târgoviște	Transfer	Summer		Undisclosed	
	DF	(Croatia)	Luka Marić	29		Persepolis (Iran)	Transfer	Summer		Free	
	MF	(Romania)	Dan Nistor	28	EU	Pandurii Târgu Jiu	Transfer	Summer		Free	
	FW	(Slovakia)	Adam Nemec	30	EU	Willem II (Netherlands)	Transfer	Summer		Free	
	MF	(South Africa)	May Mahlangu	27	EU	Sint Truiden (Belgium)	Transfer	Summer		Free	
	DF	(Italy)	Luca Ceccarelli	33	EU	Bologna FC (Italy)	Transfer	Summer		Free	
	FW	(Jordan)	Tha'er Bawab	31		Umm Salal (Qatar)	Transfer	Winter		Free	
	MF	(Romania)	Claudiu Bumba	23	EU	Hapoel Tel Aviv (Israel)	Transfer	Winter		Free	
	GK	(Lithuania)	Vytautas Černiauskas	27	EU	Ermis FC (Cyprus)	Transfer	Winter		Free	
	FW	(Moldova)	Danu Spătaru	22		Zimbru Chișinău (Moldova)	Transfer	Winter		Free	

Transfers out:

No.	Pos.	Nat.	Name	Age	EU	Moving to	Type	Transfer window	Transfer fee	Source
	MF	(Romania)	Paul Batin	28	EU	Miedź Legnica (Poland)	Released	Summer	Free	
	MF	(Romania)	Eric Bicfalvi	28	EU	Tom Tomsk (Russia)	Released	Summer	Free	
	DF	(Romania)	Andrei Marc	23	EU	Şanlıurfaspor (Turkey)	Sold	Summer	200,000 €	
	DF	(Slovenia)	Miha Mevlja	26	EU	FK Rostov (Russia)	Sold	Summer	700,000 €	
	FW	(France)	Harlem Gnohéré	28	EU	FCSB	Sold	Winter	250,000 €	
	MF	(Romania)	Dorin Rotariu	21	EU	Club Brugge (Belgium)	Sold	Winter	2.2 M €	

Last updated: 2017-2-1

Loans in

Start date	End date	Position	Player	From club	Fee
6 February 2017	End of season	DF	Claude Dielna	Sheffield Wednesday	None

Loans out

Start date	End date	Position	Player	To club	Fee
28 July 2016	End of season	MF	Paul Anton	Getafe CF	None
19 January 2017	End of season	MF	Valentin Lazăr	Al-Sailiya SC	None

== Squad statistics ==
No.	Pos.	Player	League	
No.	Pos.	Player	Apps	Goals
1	GK	(Romania) Brănescu	17	0
2	DF	(Romania) Popescu	11	0
4	MF	(Romania) Hanca	33	9
5	DF	(Romania) Nedelcearu	33	3
6	DF	(Bosnia and Herzegovina) Bušuladžić	33	0
7	DF	(Romania) Filip	31	2
8	MF	(Jordan) Bawab	12	0
9	MF	(Brazil) Rivaldinho	11	2
10	MF	(Romania) Nistor	29	3
13	FW	(Romania) Popa	11	0
15	DF	(France) Dielna	10	0
16	DF	(Argentina) Oliva	11	0
17	FW	(Slovakia) Nemec	28	11
18	MF	(South Africa) Mahlangu	22	0
19	MF	(Romania) Petre	14	0
20	MF	(Croatia) Palić	31	1
21	FW	(Moldova) Spătaru	2	0
22	DF	(Romania) Dudea	4	0
23	MF	(Romania) Șerban	5	0
24	DF	(Italy) Ceccarelli	7	0
26	GW	(Panama) Penedo	14	0
28	MF	(Croatia) Marić	17	2
29	DF	(Spain) Romera	32	1
30	MF	(Romania) Tîrcoveanu	1	0
31	MF	(Romania) Bumba	9	2
94	DF	(Romania) Corbu	1	0
99	GK	(Lithuania) Černiauskas	5	0
Players retired, sold or loaned out during the season
8	MF	(Romania) Lazăr	19	7
9	MF	(Romania) Rotariu	21	6
10	FW	(France) Gnohéré	14	5
17	DF	(Slovenia) Mevlja	6	0
21	DF	(Romania) Olteanu	4	0
28	MF	(Romania) Anton	1	0

Statistics accurate as of match played 20 March 2016

== Competitions ==
=== Liga I ===
==== Regular season ====
Overall								Home						Away					
Pld	W	D	L	GF	GA	GD	Pts	W	D	L	GF	GA	GD	W	D	L	GF	GA	GD
26	12	5	9	40	33	+7	41	8	2	3	23	13	+10	4	3	6	17	20	−3

Last updated: 28 February 2017.
Source: Competitive Matches

===== Table =====
Pos	Team	Pld	W	D	L	GF	GA	GD	Pts	Qualification
4	CFR Cluj (Note: CFR Cluj were deducted six points for failing to comply with licensing requirements.)	26	14	7	5	42	23	+19	43	Qualification for the Championship round
5	Universitatea Craiova	26	13	4	9	36	26	+10	43	Qualification for the Championship round
6	Dinamo București	26	12	5	9	40	33	+7	41	Qualification for the Championship round
7	Gaz Metan Mediaș	26	10	9	7	36	27	+9	39	Qualification for the Relegation round
8	Botoșani	26	9	5	12	30	31	−1	32	Qualification for the Relegation round

Source: Liga 1, Soccerway
Rules for classification: 1) Points; 2) Head-to-head points; 3) Head-to-head goal difference; 4) Head-to-head goals scored; 5) Goal difference; 6) Goals scored; 7) Play-off.

==== Championship round ====
Overall								Home						Away					
Pld	W	D	L	GF	GA	GD	Pts	W	D	L	GF	GA	GD	W	D	L	GF	GA	GD
10	5	4	1	15	8	+7	19	3	2	0	7	3	+4	2	2	1	8	5	+3

Last updated: 20 June 2017.
Source: Competitive Matches

===== Table =====
Pos	Team	Pld	W	D	L	GF	GA	GD	Pts	Qualification
1	Viitorul Constanța (C)	10	5	3	2	12	8	+4	44	Qualification for the Champions League third qualifying round
2	FCSB	10	6	2	2	15	7	+8	44	Qualification for the Champions League third qualifying round
3	Dinamo București	10	5	4	1	15	8	+7	40	Qualification for the Europa League third qualifying round
4	CFR Cluj (Note: CFR Cluj failed to obtain a UEFA licence after filing for insolvency in 2015.)	10	3	2	5	8	14	−6	33	
5	Universitatea Craiova	10	2	3	5	8	14	−6	31	Qualification for the Europa League third qualifying round (Note: Since the winners of 2016–17 Cupa României, Voluntari, failed to obtain a UEFA licence, the spot awarded to the cup winner (Europa League third qualifying round) was passed to the next best-placed team with a UEFA licence (in this case to the fifth-placed team) and the spot awarded to the fifth-placed team (Europa League second qualifying round) was passed down to the sixth-placed team.)
6	Astra Giurgiu	10	1	2	7	10	17	−7	27	Qualification for the Europa League second qualifying round

Source: Soccerway, Romanian Football Federation
Rules for classification: 1) Points; 2) Head-to-head points; 3) Head-to-head goal difference; 4) Head-to-head goals scored; 5) Goal difference; 6) Goals scored; 7) Matches won; 8) Play-off.
(C) Champions

== Results ==
Liga I
Round	Date	Opponent	Stadium	Result	Goals for Dinamo
1	23 July 2016	Astra Giurgiu	A	4–1	Gnohéré 23p, 70p, 76, Lazăr 43
2	30 July 2016	ACS Poli Timișoara	H	2–1	Rotariu 27, 38
3	8 August 2016	CFR Cluj	A	0–0	
4	15 August 2016	FC Voluntari	H	3–1	Gnohéré 12, Filip 16, Lazăr 27
5	20 August 2016	FCSB	A	1–1	Rotariu 11
6	26 August 2016	Gaz Metan Mediaș	H	1–1	Lazăr 14
7	12 September 2016	FCM Târgu Mureș	A	1–2	Rotariu 60
8	17 September 2016	Politehnica Iași	H	3–1	Marić 14, Lazăr 18, Nemec 55
9	20 September 2016	Viitorul Constanța	A	1–1	Lazăr 17
10	24 September 2016	Concordia Chiajna	H	0–1	
11	1 October 2016	FC Botoșani	A	1–2	Rotariu 51
12	17 October 2016	U.Craiova	A	1–2	Hanca 62
13	22 October 2016	Pandurii Târgu Jiu	H	4–0	D.Lazăr 5 OG, V.Lazăr 37, 89, Palić 39
14	29 October 2016	Astra Giurgiu	H	2–2	Nemec 34, Hanca 51
15	5 November 2016	Poli Timișoara	A	2–1	Nedelcearu 25, Marić 57
16	21 November 2016	CFR Cluj	H	0–2	
17	26 November 2016	FC Voluntari	A	2–1	Gnohéré 64p, Rotariu 87
18	30 November 2016	FCSB	H	3–1	Hanca 37p, Nedelcearu 45, Nemec 58
19	5 December 2016	CS Gaz Metan Mediaș	A	0–4	
20	10 December 2016	Târgu Mureș	H	1–0	Nemec 21
21	18 December 2016	Poli Iași	A	1–3	Nedelcearu 7
22	4 February 2017	Viitorul Constanța	H	1–2	Nistor 26
23	13 February 2017	Concordia Chiajna	A	1–2	Nemec 51
24	20 February 2017	FC Botoșani	H	1–0	Hanca 70
25	25 February 2017	Universitatea Craiova	H	2–1	Nemec 5, 14
26	5 March 2017	Pandurii Târgu Jiu	A	2–0	Nemec 34, Nistor 85
POff 1	13 March 2017	Viitorul Constanța	A	0–0	
POff 2	19 March 2017	Universitatea Craiova	H	0–0	
POff 3	2 April 2017	FCSB	A	1–2	Nemec 57
POff 4	5 April 2017	CFR Cluj	H	2–0	Nemec 21, Rivaldinho 42
POff 5	10 April 2017	Astra Giurgiu	A	2–1	Rivaldinho 83, Bumba 85
POff 6	16 April 2017	Viitorul Constanța	H	2–1	Hanca 68, 74
POff 7	22 April 2017	Universitatea Craiova	A	2–2	Romera 57, Nistor 81
POff 8	1 May 2017	FCSB	H	2–1	Hanca 34p, 90p
POff 9	6 May 2017	CFR Cluj	A	3–0	Filip 50, Hanca 87, Bumba 90p
POff 10	13 May 2017	Astra Giurgiu	H	1–1	Nemec 40

Cupa României
Round	Date	Opponent	Stadium	Result	Goals for Dinamo
Last 32	26 October 2016	Dinamo II	București	2–1	Groza 55 OG, Petre 79
Last 16	15 December 2016	Gaz Metan Mediaș	Mediaș	3–1	Romera 60, Buzean 78 OG, Nistor 90
Quarter-finals	29 March 2017	Universitatea Craiova	Craiova	0-0p	

Cupa Ligii
Round	Date	Opponent	Stadium	Result	Goals for Dinamo
Qualifying Round	11 August 2016	FC Voluntari	București	2–1	Popa 13, 25
Quarter-finals	17 November 2016	Astra Giurgiu	Giurgiu	5–2	Gnohéré 13, Palić 52p, Popa 91, Hanca 104p, 115
Semifinals 1st Leg	22 December 2016	FCSB	Home	4–1	Mahlangu 19, Nistor 65, Lazăr 79, Rotariu 90
Semifinals 2nd Leg	1 March 2017	FCSB	Away	3–1	Nistor 37, Petre 74, Hanca 82p
Final	20 May 2017	ACS Poli Timișoara	București	2–0	Nemec 6, 26

Cupa Ligii 2016–17 Winners
Dinamo București
1st Title

== Cupa Ligii final ==
20 May 2017
20:00

Dinamo București	2–0	Poli Timișoara
Nemec 6', 26'

Arena Națională, Bucharest
Attendance: 20,000
Referee: Radu Petrescu (Bucharest)

DINAMO:
GK	26. Jaime Penedo
DF	29. José Romera
DF	5. Ionuț Nedelcearu
DF	15. Claude Dielna
DF	7. Steliano Filip
MF	20. Antun Palić
MF	18. May Mahlangu
MF	10. Dan Nistor
MF	4. Sergiu Hanca	(substituted off) 73'
FW	9. Rivaldinho	(substituted off) 63'|
FW	17. Adam Nemec	(substituted off) 83'
Substitutes:
FW	8. Tha'er Bawab	(substituted on) 63'
DF	6. Azer Bušuladžić	(substituted on) 73'
DF	30. Andrei Tîrcoveanu	(substituted on) 83'
Manager:
Cosmin Contra

POLI TIMIȘOARA:
GK	33. Vasile Curileac
DF	94. Denis Haruț
DF	30. Alin Șeroni
DF	15. Cristian Bocșan
DF	22. Leopold Novak	(substituted off) 90+1'
MF	9. Alexandru Popovici
MF	19. Alin Ignea
MF	18. Andrei Artean	(substituted off) 57'
MF	11. Josip Fuček	(substituted off) 57'
FW	26. Cosmin Bîrnoi
FW	85. Octavian Drăghici
Substitutes:
MF	10. Cătălin Doman	(substituted on) 57'
MF	16. Josip Šoljić	(substituted on) 57'
MF	4. Ionuț Murariu	(substituted on) 90+1'
Manager:
Ionuț Popa
