= 2017–18 FC Dinamo București season =

Dinamo București
2017–18 season
- Chairman: Alexandru David
- Head coach: Cosmin Contra (until 17 September); Vasile Miriuță (from 21 September - until 26 February); Florin Bratu (from 26 February)
- Liga I: 7th
- Romanian Cup: Quarter-finals
- UEFA Europa League: Third qualifying round
- Top goalscorer: League: Diogo Salomão (9); All: Diogo Salomão (9)
Home colours	Away colours	Third colours

The 2017–18 season was FC Dinamo București's 69th season in Liga 1. Dinamo finished 7th in the league and reached the quarter-finals of the Romanian Cup. In the UEFA Europa League, they played in third qualifying round.

== Players ==
=== Squad information ===
Note: Flags indicate national team as defined under FIFA eligibility rules; some limited exceptions apply. Players may hold more than one non-FIFA nationality.

No.	Pos.	Nation	Player
1	GK	ROU	Laurențiu Brănescu
2	DF	ROU	Constantin Nica
3	DF	GRE	Georgios Katsikas
4	MF	ROU	Sergiu Hanca
5	DF	ROU	Ionuț Nedelcearu
6	DF	ROU	Mihai Popescu
7	MF	CRO	Antun Palić
8	MF	ESP	Aitor Monroy
9	FW	CRO	Ivan Pešić
10	MF	ROU	Dan Nistor
12	GK	ROU	Vlad Muțiu
15	DF	ROU	Vlad Olteanu
16	DF	ARG	Maximiliano Oliva
17	FW	SVK	Adam Nemec
18	MF	RSA	May Mahlangu
19	FW	ROU	Daniel Popa
20	FW	POR	Diogo Salomão
21	MF	ROU	Liviu Gheorghe
22	MF	ROU	Gabriel Torje
23	MF	ROU	Ionuț Șerban
24	MF	ROU	Alin Dudea

No.	Pos.	Nation	Player
26	GK	PAN	Jaime Penedo
27	DF	ROU	Ricardo Grigore
28	DF	CRO	Luka Marić
29	DF	ESP	José Romera
30	MF	ROU	Ion Gheorghe
31	FW	ROU	Robert Moldoveanu
32	FW	ROU	Aleksandru Longher
33	DF	ROU	Laurențiu Corbu
—	DF	ROU	Marco Ehmann
—	DF	ROU	Steliano Filip
—	MF	URU	Juan Albín
—	MF	ROU	Paul Anton
—	MF	ROU	Claudiu Bumba
—	MF	BIH	Azer Bušuladžić
—	MF	ROU	Valentin Costache
—	MF	POR	Filipe Nascimento
—	MF	ROU	Cristi Vasile
—	FW	JOR	Tha'er Bawab
—	FW	COD	Jeremy Bokila
—	FW	ROU	Gabriel Răducan
—	FW	BRA	Rivaldinho

== Competitions ==
=== Liga I ===
==== Regular season ====
===== Table =====
Pos	Team	Pld	W	D	L	GF	GA	GD	Pts	Qualification
6	CSM Politehnica Iași	26	11	6	9	34	31	+3	39 (Note: Iași is ahead of Botoșani and Dinamo on head-to-head points: Iași 7 pts, Botoșani 5 pts, Dinamo 4 pts.)	Qualification for the Championship round
7	Botoșani	26	11	6	9	28	26	+2	39	Qualification for the Relegation round
8	Dinamo București	26	11	6	9	39	31	+8	39	Qualification for the Relegation round
9	Concordia Chiajna	26	8	4	14	36	37	−1	28 (Note: Concordia is ahead of Voluntari on head-to-head results: Voluntari–Concordia 0–1, Concordia–Voluntari 3–1.)	Qualification for the Relegation round
10	Voluntari	26	7	7	12	25	35	−10	28	Qualification for the Relegation round

Source: LPF (in Romanian), Soccerway
Rules for classification: 1) Points; 2) Head-to-head points; 3) Head-to-head goal difference; 4) Head-to-head goals scored; 5) Goal difference; 6) Goals scored; 7) Play-off.

===== Results summary =====
Overall								Home						Away					
Pld	W	D	L	GF	GA	GD	Pts	W	D	L	GF	GA	GD	W	D	L	GF	GA	GD
26	11	6	9	39	31	+8	39	5	3	5	19	19	0	6	3	4	20	12	+8

Last updated: 24 February 2018.

===== Results by round =====
Round	1	2	3	4	5	6	7	8	9	10	11	12	13	14	15	16	17	18	19	20	21	22	23	24	25	26
Ground	A	H	A	H	A	A	H	A	H	A	H	A	H	H	A	H	A	H	H	A	H	A	H	A	H	A
Result	W	L	W	W	L	L	W	W	L	D	L	L	D	W	D	L	W	L	W	W	W	D	D	W	D	L
Position	1	5	4	4	5	6	5	5	7	7	7	7	7	6	7	7	7	7	7	7	7	7	7	6	6	8

Updated to match(es) played on 24 February 2018. Source:
A = Away; H = Home; W = Win; D = Draw; L = Loss

===== Matches =====
Win Draw Loss

15 July 2017 1	Juventus București	0–3	Dinamo București	Ploiești
21:00 EEST (UTC+3)				Stadium: Ilie Oană

23 July 2017 2	Dinamo București	0–1	Botoșani	Bucharest
21:00 EEST (UTC+3)				Stadium: Arena Națională

30 July 2017 3	Viitorul Constanța	0–1	Dinamo București	Ovidiu
18:00 EEST (UTC+3)				Stadium: Viitorul

7 August 2017 4	Dinamo București	3–1	Gaz Metan Mediaș	Bucharest
21:00 EEST (UTC+3)				Stadium: Dinamo

10 August 2017 5	CFR Cluj	1–0	Dinamo București	Cluj-Napoca
21:00 EEST (UTC+3)				Stadium: Dr. Constantin Rădulescu

13 August 2017 6	Politehnica Iași	2–1	Dinamo București	Iași
20:00 EEST (UTC+3)				Stadium: Emil Alexandrescu

21 August 2017 7	Dinamo București	1–0	Sepsi Sfântu Gheorghe	Bucharest
21:00 EEST (UTC+3)				Stadium: Dinamo

26 August 2017 8	FC Voluntari	1–3	Dinamo București	Voluntari
21:00 EEST (UTC+3)				Stadium: Anghel Iordănescu

11 September 2017 9	Dinamo București	1–2	Poli Timișoara	Bucharest
20:35 EEST (UTC+3)				Stadium: Dinamo

16 September 2017 10	Universitatea Craiova	2–2	Dinamo București	Drobeta-Turnu Severin
20:30 EEST (UTC+3)				Stadium: Municipal

24 September 2017 12	FCSB	1–0	Dinamo București	Bucharest
20:30 EEST (UTC+3)				Stadium: Arena Națională

27 September 2017 11	Dinamo București	2–3	Concordia Chiajna	Bucharest
16:30 EEST (UTC+3)				Stadium: Dinamo

30 September 2017 13	Dinamo București	1–1	Astra Giurgiu	Bucharest
20:30 EEST (UTC+3)				Stadium: Dinamo

16 October 2017 14	Dinamo București	3–0	Juventus București	Bucharest
20:45 EEST (UTC+3)				Stadium: Dinamo

23 October 2017 15	Botoșani	0–0	Dinamo București	Botoșani
20:45 EEST (UTC+3)				Stadium: Municipal

30 October 2017 16	Dinamo București	0–4	Viitorul Constanța	Bucharest
20:45 EET (UTC+2)				Stadium: Dinamo

4 November 2017 17	Gaz Metan Mediaș	0–3	Dinamo București	Mediaș
20:45 EET (UTC+2)				Stadium: Gaz Metan

19 November 2017 18	Dinamo București	0–2	CFR Cluj	Bucharest
20:45 EET (UTC+2)				Stadium: Dinamo

25 November 2017 19	Dinamo București	2–1	Politehnica Iași	Bucharest
20:45 EET (UTC+2)				Stadium: Dinamo

4 December 2017 20	Sepsi Sfântu Gheorghe	0–3	Dinamo București	Sfântu Gheorghe
20:45 EET (UTC+2)				Stadium: Municipal

11 December 2017 21	Dinamo București	2–0	FC Voluntari	Bucharest
20:00 EET (UTC+2)				Stadium: Dinamo

18 December 2017 22	Poli Timișoara	0–0	Dinamo București	Timișoara
20:00 EET (UTC+2)				Stadium: Dan Păltinișanu

4 February 2018 23	Dinamo București	2–2	Universitatea Craiova	Bucharest
20:45 EET (UTC+2)				Stadium: Dinamo

12 February 2018 24	Concordia Chiajna	3–4	Dinamo București	Chiajna
20:45 EET (UTC+2)				Stadium: Concordia

18 February 2018 25	Dinamo București	2–2	FCSB	Bucharest
20:45 EET (UTC+2)				Stadium: Arena Națională

24 February 2018 26	Astra Giurgiu	2–0	Dinamo București	Giurgiu
19:50 EET (UTC+2)				Stadium: Marin Anastasovici

==== Play-out round ====
===== Table =====
Pos	Team	Pld	W	D	L	GF	GA	GD	Pts	Qualification or relegation
7	Dinamo București	14	11	1	2	29	10	+19	54	
8	Botoșani	14	5	5	4	12	9	+3	40	
9	Sepsi OSK	14	6	6	2	21	14	+7	34	
10	Gaz Metan Mediaș	14	6	4	4	18	15	+3	30	
11	Concordia Chiajna	14	4	4	6	13	17	−4	30	
12	Voluntari (O)	14	3	4	7	16	22	−6	27	Qualification for the relegation play-offs
13	ACS Poli Timișoara (R)	14	3	4	7	10	16	−6	27	Relegation to Liga II
14	Juventus București (R)	14	3	2	9	9	25	−16	17	Relegation to Liga II

Source: Soccerway
Rules for classification: 1) Points; 2) Points without rounding; 3) Head-to-head points; 4) Head-to-head goal difference; 5) Head-to-head goals scored; 6) Goal difference; 7) Goals scored; 8) Play-off (only if needed to decide teams for relegation). (Note: only criteria 6 and 7 are applied to establish the classification during the competition.)
(O) Play-off winners; (R) Relegated

===== Results summary =====
Overall								Home						Away					
Pld	W	D	L	GF	GA	GD	Pts	W	D	L	GF	GA	GD	W	D	L	GF	GA	GD
14	11	1	2	29	10	+19	34	5	1	1	12	3	+9	6	0	1	17	7	+10

Last updated: 1 June 2018.

===== Position by round =====
Round	1	2	3	4	5	6	7	8	9	10	11	12	13	14
Ground	H	A	H	H	A	H	A	A	H	A	A	H	A	H
Result	W	W	L	W	W	W	L	W	W	W	W	W	W	D
Position	7	7	7	7	7	7	7	7	7	7	7	7	7	7

Updated to match(es) played on 1 June 2018. Source:
A = Away; H = Home; W = Win; D = Draw; L = Loss

===== Matches =====
Win Draw Loss

12 March 2018 1	Dinamo București	3–0	Gaz Metan Mediaș	Bucharest
20:50 EET (UTC+2)				Stadium: Dinamo

30 March 2018 3	Dinamo București	1–2	Juventus București	Bucharest
20:45 EET (UTC+2)				Stadium: Dinamo

3 April 2018 2	Botoșani	0–1	Dinamo București	Botoșani
18:00 EEST (UTC+3)				Stadium: Municipal

7 April 2018 4	Dinamo București	3–1	Concordia Chiajna	Bucharest
20:50 EEST (UTC+3)				Stadium: Dinamo

13 April 2018 5	FC Voluntari	2–4	Dinamo București	Voluntari
20:45 EEST (UTC+3)				Stadium: Anghel Iordănescu

20 April 2018 6	Dinamo București	1–0	Poli Timișoara	Bucharest
20:45 EEST (UTC+3)				Stadium: Dinamo

30 April 2018 7	Sepsi Sfântu Gheorghe	2–0	Dinamo București	Sfântu Gheorghe
18:00 EEST (UTC+3)				Stadium: Municipal

6 May 2018 8	Gaz Metan Mediaș	2–3	Dinamo București	Mediaș
18:30 EEST (UTC+3)				Stadium: Gaz Metan

12 May 2018 9	Dinamo București	2–0	Botoșani	Bucharest
21:30 EEST (UTC+3)				Stadium: Dinamo

15 May 2018 10	Juventus București	0–2	Dinamo București	Voluntari
21:00 EEST (UTC+3)				Stadium: Anghel Iordănescu

19 May 2018 11	Concordia Chiajna	0–4	Dinamo București	Chiajna
21:45 EEST (UTC+3)				Stadium: Concordia

23 May 2018 12	Dinamo București	2–0	FC Voluntari	Bucharest
20:45 EEST (UTC+3)				Stadium: Dinamo

28 May 2018 13	Poli Timișoara	1–3	Dinamo București	Timișoara
20:45 EEST (UTC+3)				Stadium: Dan Păltinișanu

1 June 2018 14	Dinamo București	0–0	Sepsi Sfântu Gheorghe	Bucharest
20:45 EEST (UTC+3)				Stadium: Dinamo

=== Cupa României ===
26 October 2017 Round of 32	Aerostar Bacău	0–1	Dinamo București	Piatra Neamț
21:00		Report	Nemec 85'	Stadium: Ceahlăul; Attendance: 3,000; Referee: Florin Mazilu (Satu Mare)

29 November 2017 Round of 16	Universitatea Cluj	1–1 (a.e.t.) (1–3 p)	Dinamo București	Cluj-Napoca
20:30	Goga 34'	Report	Corbu 14'	Stadium: Cluj Arena; Attendance: 10,000; Referee: Ionuț Coza (Cernica)
	Penalties
	Goga (penalty missed); Florescu (penalty missed); Ursu (penalty scored); Chiș (penalty missed)		(penalty missed) Anton; (penalty scored) Filip; (penalty scored) Rivaldinho; (penalty scored) Salomão

6 March 2018 Quarter-finals	Universitatea Craiova	1–0	Dinamo București	Craiova
17:00	Bancu 56'	Report		Stadium: Ion Oblemenco; Attendance: 26,000; Referee: Horațiu Feșnic (Cluj-Napoca)

=== UEFA Europa League ===
27 July 2017 3Q, 1L	Dinamo București (Romania)	1–1	(Spain) Athletic Bilbao	Bucharest, Romania
19:30	Rivaldinho 54'	Report	Laporte 21'	Stadium: Arena Națională (Note: Dinamo București played their home match at Arena Națională, Bucharest, instead of their regular stadium Stadionul Dinamo, Bucharest.); Attendance: 26,783; Referee: Tore Hansen (Norway)

3 August 2017 3Q, 2L	Athletic Bilbao (Spain)	3–0 (4–1 agg.)	(Romania) Dinamo București	Bilbao, Spain
20:45	García 24', 29'; Aduriz 86'	Report		Stadium: San Mamés; Attendance: 41,845; Referee: Pavle Radovanović (Montenegro)
