= Steliano Filip =

Romanian professional footballer

Personal information
- Date of birth: 15 May 1994 (age 32)
- Place of birth: Buzău, Romania
- Height: 1.79 m (5 ft 10 in)
- Position: Left-back

Team information
- Current team: ASK Hausmening

Youth career
- 2001–2011: LPS Banatul Timișoara

Senior career*
Years	Team	Apps	(Gls)
2011–2012	FCMU Baia Mare	16	(2)
2012–2018	Dinamo București	128	(5)
2012–2013	Dinamo II București	9	(0)
2018–2019	Hajduk Split	10	(0)
2019	Dunărea Călărași	7	(1)
2019–2020	Viitorul Constanța	12	(0)
2020–2021	AEL	22	(0)
2021–2022	Dinamo București	39	(1)
2022–2023	Mezőkövesd	24	(0)
2025–2026	Lotus Băile Felix	10	(3)
2026	Edelweiss Linz	8	(0)
2026–	ASK Hausmening	0	(0)

International career
2011	Romania U17	4	(1)
2011	Romania U18	1	(1)
2011–2012	Romania U19	6	(0)
2013–2015	Romania U21	9	(0)
2014–2017	Romania	8	(0)
- * Club domestic league appearances and goals as of 22 May 2026

Steliano Filip (born 15 May 1994) is a Romanian professional footballer who plays as a left-back for ASK Hausmening.

== Club career ==
Filip started his career at the LPS Banatul football school, in Timișoara. His first professional contract came in 2011, when he accepted the offer that came from FC Maramureș Baia Mare, although Poli Timișoara wanted him to remain in the city.

He impressed at Baia Mare, entering the attention of Juventus.

=== Dinamo București ===
In the summer of 2012, Filip made a big step in his career, moving to Dinamo București, where he signed a 5-year contract. He scored his first goal for Dinamo in a friendly game against Austrian team SK Klagenfurt.

His first match in Liga I came on 26 August 2012, when he replaced Cosmin Matei in the 75th minute of a game against Petrolul Ploiești.

=== Hajduk Split ===
On 23 January 2018, he signed for Croatian club HNK Hajduk Split on a three-and-a-half-year deal, picking the shirt number 77.

=== Dunărea Călărași ===
On 15 February 2019 he signed for Dunărea Călărași.

=== Viitorul Constanța ===
On 21 June 2019 Steliano Filip signed a 2-year contract with Viitorul Constanța. On 20 January 2020, Viitorul Constanța released Filip.

=== Return to Dinamo ===
In January 2021, he returned to Dinamo București, signing a two-and-a-half-year contract. He was one of the most important players of the club in the 2021-2022 season, which marked the first relegation in history for the club. During the season, he was involved in several scandals, being widely considered one of the most underperforming players in the team. On 12 September, he saw a direct red card for violent conduct in the derby against FCSB. In December, after several poor games, he was excluded from the squad by manager Mircea Rednic. He reintegrated the team in March, under the new manager Flavius Stoican, but he continued to underperform and to appear constantly in media, in debates with former manager Mircea Rednic and with Dinamo supporters. He left the club in July 2022, just days after Dinamo relegated from Liga I.

Among others, there were rumours that Filip's salary was partly supported by businessman Nicolae Badea, while the club's accounts were blocked. There were also rumours about an investigation into match fixing involving Filip during the 2021-22 season.

=== Mezőkövesd ===
On 30 November 2022, he signed a two-and-a-half-year contract with Mezőkövesdi SE.

== International career ==
Filip made his debut for Romania U-17 on 24 March 2011 in a game against Iceland U-17. He played with the under-17 team at the 2011 UEFA European Under-17 Football Championship.

His first game for the national under-21 team was played in August 2013, against Cyprus.

He made his debut for the national team on 17 November 2015, in a friendly game against Italy, played in Bologna.

== Career statistics ==
=== Club ===
As of match played 22 May 2026

Appearances and goals by club, season and competition
Club	Season	League			National cup (Note: Includes Cupa României, Croatian Cup, Magyar Kupa)		Europe		Other		Total	
Club	Season	Division	Apps	Goals	Apps	Goals	Apps	Goals	Apps	Goals	Apps	Goals
FCMU Baia Mare	2011–12	Liga II	16	2	0	0	—		—		16	2
Dinamo București	2012–13	Liga I	9	0	1	0	1 (Note: Appearances in UEFA Europa League)	0	0	0	11	0
Dinamo București	2013–14	Liga I	22	0	4	0	—		—		26	0
Dinamo București	2014–15	Liga I	23	0	1	0	—		3 (Note: Appearances in Cupa Ligii)	1	27	1
Dinamo București	2015–16	Liga I	26	2	2	0	—		2	0	30	2
Dinamo București	2016–17	Liga I	31	2	3	0	—		4	0	38	2
Dinamo București	2017–18	Liga I	17	1	2	0	2	0	—		21	1
Dinamo București	Total		128	5	13	0	3	0	9	1	153	6
Dinamo II București	2012–13	Liga II	7	0	1	0	—		—		8	0
Dinamo II București	2013–14	Liga III	2	0	—		—		—		2	0
Dinamo II București	Total		9	0	1	0	—		—		10	0
Hajduk Split	2017–18	Prva HNL	4	0	1	0	—		—		5	0
Hajduk Split	2018–19	Prva HNL	6	0	0	0	0	0	—		6	0
Hajduk Split	Total		10	0	1	0	0	0	—		11	0
Dunărea Călărași	2018–19	Liga I	7	1	1	0	—		—		8	1
Viitorul Constanța	2019–20	Liga I	12	0	1	0	1	0	0	0	14	0
AEL	2019–20	Super League Greece	7	0	—		—		—		7	0
AEL	2020–21	Super League Greece	15	0	0	0	—		—		15	0
AEL	Total		22	0	0	0	—		—		22	0
Dinamo București	2020–21	Liga I	17	1	4	0	—		—		21	1
Dinamo București	2021–22	Liga I	22	0	1	0	—		2 (Note: Appearances in Liga I promotion/relegation play-offs)	0	25	0
Dinamo București	Total		39	1	5	0	—		2	0	46	1
Mezőkövesd	2022–23	Nemzeti Bajnokság I	15	0	2	0	—		—		17	0
Mezőkövesd	2023–24	Nemzeti Bajnokság I	9	0	0	0	—		—		9	0
Mezőkövesd	Total		24	0	0	0	—		—		24	0
Lotus Băile Felix	2025–26	Liga III	10	3	0	0	—		—		10	3
Edelweiss Linz	2025–26	OÖ Liga	8	0	—		—		—		8	0
Career total			285	12	24	0	4	0	11	1	324	13

=== International ===
Appearances and goals by national team and year
National team	Year	Apps	Goals
Romania
Romania	2015	2	0
Romania	2016	6	0
Romania	2017	0	0
Total		8	0

== Honours ==
Dinamo București

- Cupa României runner-up: 2015–16
- Cupa Ligii: 2016–17
- Supercupa României: 2012

Hajduk Split

- Croatian Cup runner-up: 2017–18

Viitorul Constanța

- Supercupa României: 2019
