= Ionuț Nedelcearu =

Romanian footballer (born 1996)

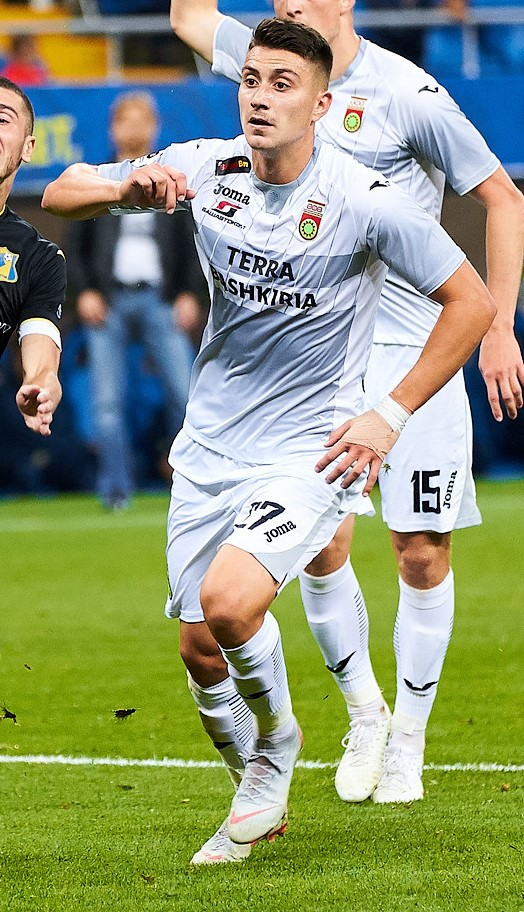
- Nedelcearu with Ufa in 2018

Personal information
- Date of birth: 25 April 1996 (age 30)
- Place of birth: Bucharest, Romania
- Height: 1.90 m (6 ft 3 in)
- Position: Centre-back

Team information
- Current team: Akron Tolyatti
- Number: 24

Youth career
- 2003–2013: Dinamo București

Senior career*
Years	Team	Apps	(Gls)
2013–2014	Dinamo II București	24	(0)
2013–2018	Dinamo București	89	(5)
2018–2020	Ufa	65	(1)
2020–2021	AEK Athens	25	(1)
2021–2022	Crotone	34	(2)
2022–2025	Palermo	65	(2)
2025–	Akron Tolyatti	44	(1)

International career^{‡}
2013	Romania U17	2	(0)
2013	Romania U18	4	(0)
2014–2019	Romania U21	18	(1)
2018–	Romania	27	(2)
- * Club domestic league appearances and goals as of 21 November 2026 ‡ National team caps and goals as of 4 June 2024

Ionuț Nedelcearu (Romanian pronunciation: [joˈnuts nedelˈtʃe̯aru]; born 25 April 1996) is a Romanian professional footballer who plays as a centre-back for Russian Premier League club Akron Tolyatti.

== Club career ==
=== Dinamo București ===
Nedelcearu joined the youth system of Dinamo București at the age of seven. After playing for the reserves, he made his first-team debut on 31 October 2013 in a Cupa României match against Chindia Târgoviște, aged 17. On 13 December that year, he recorded his first Liga I appearance in a 4–0 home victory over ACS Poli Timișoara.

Nedelcearu netted his first goal for the Alb-roșii in a 3–2 away win against Pandurii Târgu Jiu on 28 October 2015, a game where he also scored in his own net.

=== Ufa ===
On 15 February 2018, Nedelcearu signed a three-and-a-half-year contract with Russian Premier League side FC Ufa. In the summer of 2019, press reported that several teams showed interest in signing him, including Roma and Zenit Saint Petersburg.

=== AEK Athens ===
On 5 October 2020, Nedelcearu signed a four-year contract with Super League Greece club AEK Athens. On 1 November 2020, he scored his first goal, the equalizer of an eventual 2–1 home win against OFI.

=== Crotone ===
On 16 July 2021, he moved to Italian club Crotone on a three-year contract, for a fee of €1.2 million.

=== Palermo ===
On 27 July 2022, following Crotone's relegation to Serie C, Nedelcearu signed for Serie B club Palermo on a three-year deal. He made his debut with the rosanero in the 32nd finals of Coppa Italia against Torino.

=== Akron Tolyatti ===
On 7 February 2025, Nedelcearu returned to Russia and signed with Akron Tolyatti.

== International career ==
On 27 March 2018, Nedelcearu made his full debut for Romania after being brought on as an 83rd-minute substitute in a 1–0 win over Sweden.

On 7 June 2024, he was selected in Romania's squad for the UEFA Euro 2024, but did not feature in any match.

== Personal life ==
Born in Bucharest, Nedelcearu attended the National University of Physical Education and Sport before moving abroad for the first time. His father, Marin, was also a professional footballer, while his mother, Geta, was a sprinter in her youth.

== Career statistics ==
=== Club ===
As of 21 November 2026

Appearances and goals by club, season and competition
Club	Season	League			National cup (Note: Includes Cupa României, Russian Cup, Greek Cup, Coppa Italia)		League cup (Note: Includes Cupa Ligii)		Continental		Other		Total	
Club	Season	Division	Apps	Goals	Apps	Goals	Apps	Goals	Apps	Goals	Apps	Goals	Apps	Goals
Dinamo București	2013–14	Liga I	1	0	1	0	—		—		—		2	0
Dinamo București	2014–15	Liga I	13	0	1	0	3	0	—		—		17	0
Dinamo București	2015–16	Liga I	21	0	5	1	2	0	—		—		28	1
Dinamo București	2016–17	Liga I	33	3	2	0	4	0	—		—		39	3
Dinamo București	2017–18	Liga I	21	2	2	0	—		2 (Note: Appearances in UEFA Europa League)	0	—		25	2
Dinamo București	Total		89	5	11	1	9	0	2	0	—		111	6
Ufa	2017–18	Russian Premier League	10	0	—		—		—		—		10	0
Ufa	2018–19	Russian Premier League	26	1	0	0	—		6	0	2 (Note: Appearances in Russian Premier League promotion/relegation play-offs)	0	34	1
Ufa	2019–20	Russian Premier League	20	0	1	0	—		—		—		21	0
Ufa	2020–21	Russian Premier League	9	0	1	0	—		—		—		10	0
Ufa	Total		65	1	2	0	—		6	0	2	0	75	1
AEK Athens	2020–21	Super League Greece	25	1	4	0	—		6	0	—		35	1
Crotone	2021–22	Serie B	34	2	2	0	—		—		—		36	2
Palermo	2022–23	Serie B	36	0	1	0	—		—		—		37	0
Palermo	2023–24	Serie B	20	2	0	0	—		—		1 (Note: Appearances in Serie B promotion play-offs)	0	21	2
Palermo	2024–25	Serie B	9	0	1	0	—		—		—		10	0
Palermo	Total		65	2	2	0	—		—		1	0	68	2
Akron Tolyatti	2024–25	Russian Premier League	12	0	1	0	—		—		—		13	0
Akron Tolyatti	2025–26	Russian Premier League	27	1	5	0	—		—		0	0	32	1
Akron Tolyatti	2026–27	Russian Premier League	5	0	4	0	—		—		—		9	0
Akron Tolyatti	Total		44	1	10	0	—		—		0	0	54	1
Career total			322	12	31	1	9	0	14	0	3	0	379	13

=== International ===
As of 4 June 2024

Appearances and goals by national team and year
National team	Year	Apps	Goals
Romania	2018	3	0
Romania	2019	6	0
Romania	2020	4	2
Romania	2021	7	0
Romania	2022	4	0
Romania	2023	1	0
Romania	2024	2	0
Total		27	2

As of 8 September 2021.
Scores and results list Romania's goal tally first, score column indicates score after each Nedelcearu goal.

List of international goals scored by Ionuț Nedelcearu
No.	Date	Venue	Cap	Opponent	Score	Result	Competition
1	11 November 2020	Stadionul Ilie Oană, Ploiești, Romania	12	Belarus	3–0	5–3	Friendly
2	11 November 2020	Stadionul Ilie Oană, Ploiești, Romania	12	Belarus	5–0	5–3	Friendly

== Honours ==
Dinamo București

- Cupa României runner-up: 2015–16
- Cupa Ligii: 2016–17

== See also ==
- List of foreign Russian Premier League players
