= Gëzim Shalaj =

Swiss football player (born 1990)

Personal information
- Full name: Gëzim Shalaj
- Date of birth: 28 July 1990 (age 36)
- Place of birth: Bern, Switzerland
- Height: 1.83 m (6 ft 0 in)
- Positions: Winger; attacking midfielder

Youth career
- 2000–2008: Dynamo Dresden
- 2008–2009: Düdingen

Senior career*
Years	Team	Apps	(Gls)
2009–2010	Düdingen	14	(2)
2010–2012	Kriens	49	(4)
2012	→ Luzern (loan)	1	(0)
2012–2014	Lugano	46	(5)
2014–2015	Pandurii Târgu Jiu	27	(3)
2015–2016	Dinamo București	7	(0)
2016	Enosis Neon Paralimni	5	(1)
2016–2017	Port Vale	7	(0)
2018–2019	Trepça'89		
2019	Breitenrain Bern		
2019–2021	Naters		
2023–2024	Bosporus		
Total		156	(15)
- * Club domestic league appearances and goals

Gëzim Shalaj (born 28 July 1990) is a Swiss former professional footballer who played as a midfielder.

He began his career with Swiss lower league side Düdingen, before winning a move to Swiss Challenge League club Kriens in 2010. After just over two seasons with Kriens, he joined Swiss Super League side Luzern but played just once in the top flight, in March 2012, before returning to the Challenge League to play for Lugano later in 2012. After two seasons with Lugano, he joined the Romanian Liga I side Pandurii Târgu Jiu for the 2014–15 campaign. He signed with Dinamo București in October 2015 but left the club after just two months. He spent the second half of the 2015–16 season with Cypriot First Division club Enosis Neon Paralimni. He signed with English League One side Port Vale in August 2016. He signed with Trepça'89 in the Superleague of Kosovo in January 2018 before returning to Switzerland the following year to play for Breitenrain Bern, Naters and Bosporus.

== Career ==
=== Switzerland ===
Shalaj was born in Switzerland and is of Albanian descent. He spent a brief time in the youth team at Dynamo Dresden in 2008. He began his senior career at Düdingen, scoring two goals in 14 1. Liga (third tier) appearances in the first half of the 2009–10 campaign. He moved on to Swiss Challenge League (second tier) side Kriens for the second half of the 2009–10 season. He made his debut for Kriens on 7 March, coming on as a half-time substitute for Thierry Stadelmann in a 0–0 draw with Lausanne-Sport at the Stade olympique de la Pontaise. He scored his first goal for the club on 15 May, in a 6–2 win over Locarno at Stadion Kleinfeld. He went on to become a first-team regular in the 2010–11 season, missing just one league game, though 11 of his league appearances were as a substitute. He began the 2011–12 season with three goals in 14 games, before he was signed to Swiss Super League side Luzern by manager Murat Yakin.

"Gëzim is a young and talented footballer who has shown what he can do in Kriens. That is why we loaned him to see what he is capable of at a higher level."

— Luzern coach Murat Yakin shares his first impression for Shalaj.

However, he struggled with injuries and played just one top-flight game for the "Luminaries", coming on as a half-time substitute for Nelson Ferreira in a 2–1 defeat by Servette at Stade de Genève on 11 March 2012. He returned to the Challenge League for the 2012–13 campaign, joining Lugano. He scored four goals in 20 matches as Lugano finished seventh in the 2012–13 season and then scored one in 27 appearances in the 2013–14 campaign as the club posted a second-place finish, nine points behind promoted champions Vaduz. He received the first red card of his career on 14 May 2014, in a 3–0 win over Locarno at Stadio del Lido. Both he and teammate Jonathan Sabbatini were contacted by betting fraudsters who wanted to rig a match, but Shalaj and Sabbatini reported the incident to the Swiss Football Association.

=== Romania ===
Shalaj signed a one-year contract, with the option for two more seasons, at Romanian Liga I side Pandurii Târgu Jiu in July 2014. He picked up a toe injury in December, which kept him out of action for a month. He ended the 2014–15 campaign with three goals and made six assists in 33 league and cup appearances, including one goal in a 3–1 win over champions Steaua București at the Stadionul Municipal on 15 March. The goal against Steaua București saw him named on the Liga I team of the week, alongside his midfield teammates Mihai Pintilii, Mihai Roman, and Dan Nistor. He played three matches of the club's run to the 2015 Cupa Ligii final, including a substitute appearance against Dinamo București in the first leg of the semi-final.

He joined Dinamo București in October 2015. He played 169 minutes across seven games before he had his contract cancelled by mutual agreement in December 2015.

=== Enosis Neon Paralimni ===
Shalaj moved to Cyprus to play for Cypriot First Division club Enosis Neon Paralimni in February 2016. He scored on his debut on 6 February, in a 2–0 victory over AEL Limassol at Tsirion Stadium. The club were relegated at the end of the 2015–16 season.

=== Port Vale ===
In August 2016, Shalaj signed a one-year contract with EFL League One club Port Vale.

=== Later career ===
On 8 January 2018, Shalaj joined the defending Superleague of Kosovo champions Trepça'89. He returned to his native country to sign for Swiss Promotion League side Breitenrain Bern at the end of the 2018–19 season. Ahead of the 2019–20 season, Shalaj joined Swiss 1. Liga side FC Naters.

== Style of play ==
Speaking in July 2012, Luzern manager Murat Yakin described Shalaj as "very fast" with a "strong left foot".

== Career statistics ==
Appearances and goals by club, season and competition
Club	Season	League			National Cup (Note: Includes Swiss Cup, Cupa României, Cypriot Cup, FA Cup)		League Cup (Note: Includes Cupa Ligii, EFL Cup)		Other		Total	
Club	Season	Division	Apps	Goals	Apps	Goals	Apps	Goals	Apps	Goals	Apps	Goals
Düdingen	2009–10	1. Liga	14	2	0	0	—		0	0	14	2
Kriens	2009–10	Swiss Challenge League	7	1	0	0	—		0	0	7	1
Kriens	2010–11	Swiss Challenge League	29	0	1	1	—		0	0	30	1
Kriens	2011–12	Swiss Challenge League	13	3	1	0	—		0	0	14	3
Kriens	Total		49	4	2	1	0	0	0	0	51	5
Luzern (loan)	2011–12	Swiss Super League	1	0	0	0	—		0	0	1	0
Lugano	2012–13	Swiss Challenge League	20	4	0	0	—		0	0	20	4
Lugano	2013–14	Swiss Challenge League	26	1	1	0	—		0	0	27	1
Lugano	Total		46	5	1	0	0	0	0	0	47	5
Pandurii Târgu Jiu	2014–15	Liga I	27	3	3	0	3	0	0	0	33	3
Dinamo București	2015–16	Liga I	7	0	0	0	0	0	0	0	7	0
Enosis Neon Paralimni	2015–16	Cypriot First Division	5	1	0	0	—		0	0	5	1
Port Vale	2016–17	EFL League One	7	0	1	0	0	0	1 (Note: Appearance in EFL Trophy)	0	9	0
Career total			156	15	7	1	3	0	1	0	167	16
