= Paul Batin =

Romanian footballer

Personal information
- Full name: Paul Ștefan Batin
- Date of birth: 29 June 1987 (age 39)
- Place of birth: Baia Mare, Romania
- Height: 1.80 m (5 ft 11 in)
- Position: Striker

Team information
- Current team: Minaur Baia Mare
- Number: 29

Youth career
- –2006: FC "Viorel Mateianu" Baia Mare

Senior career*
Years	Team	Apps	(Gls)
2006–2009	FC Baia Mare	87	(51)
2009–2014	CFR Cluj	32	(7)
2009–2010	→ UTA Arad (loan)	28	(13)
2010	→ Gaz Metan Mediaș (loan)	0	(0)
2011–2012	→ Pandurii Târgu Jiu (loan)	29	(5)
2012–2013	→ Brașov (loan)	29	(8)
2014–2015	Botoșani	39	(5)
2016	Dinamo București	3	(0)
2016–2017	Miedź Legnica	16	(3)
2017	Pandurii Târgu Jiu	5	(2)
2017–2018	Concordia Chiajna	53	(17)
2019	Doxa Katokopia	13	(6)
2019	Concordia Chiajna	9	(4)
2020	Minaur Baia Mare	1	(2)
2021	Comuna Recea	14	(5)
2021	Progresul Șomcuta Mare	15	(13)
2022	Concordia Chiajna	13	(2)
2022	Metalul Buzău	9	(6)
2023–2024	Victoria Carei	9	(4)
2024–	Minaur Baia Mare	10	(5)
- * Club domestic league appearances and goals as of 12:45, 2 May 2024 (UTC)

Paul Ștefan Batin (born 29 June 1987) is a Romanian footballer who plays as a striker for Minaur Baia Mare. In his career, Batin also played for teams such as FCM Baia Mare, Miedź Legnica, FC Botoșani or Concordia Chiajna, among others.

== Career statistics ==
As of 23 December 2019

Appearances and goals by club, season and competition
Club	Season	League			National cup (Note: Includes Cupa României, Polish Cup)		League cup (Note: Includes Cupa Ligii)		Europe		Total	
Club	Season	Division	Apps	Goals	Apps	Goals	Apps	Goals	Apps	Goals	Apps	Goals
Baia Mare	2006–07	Liga II	22	0	2	1	—		—		24	1
Baia Mare	2007–08	Liga III	32	26	5	5	—		—		37	31
Baia Mare	2008–09	Liga III	33	25	3	5	—		—		36	30
Baia Mare	Total		87	51	10	11	0	0	0	0	97	62
UTA Arad	2009–10	Liga II	28	13 (Note: He scored two goals against CFR Timişoara, but his record was expunged following CFR Timişoara's exclusion from the championship.)	2	1	—		—		30	14
CFR Cluj	2010–11	Liga I	14	3	2	0	—		—		16	3
CFR Cluj	2013–14	Liga I	18	4	0	0	—		—		18	4
CFR Cluj	Total		32	7	2	0	0	0	0	0	34	7
Pandurii Târgu Jiu (loan)	2011–12	Liga I	28	5	2	2	—		—		30	7
Braşov (loan)	2012–13	Liga I	29	8	1	0	—		—		30	8
Botoșani	2014–15	Liga I	27	5	1	0	1	0	—		29	5
Botoșani	2015–16	Liga I	12	0	2	0	0	0	3 (Note: Appearances in UEFA Europa League)	1	17	1
Botoșani	Total		39	5	3	0	1	0	3	1	46	6
Dinamo București	2015–16	Liga I	3	0	0	0	1	0	—		4	0
Miedź Legnica	2016–17	I liga	16	3	2	0	—		—		18	3
Pandurii Târgu Jiu	2016–17	Liga I	5	2	0	0	—		—		5	2
Concordia Chiajna	2017–18	Liga I	33	13	0	0	—		—		33	13
Concordia Chiajna	2018–19	Liga I	20	4	1	0	—		—		21	4
Concordia Chiajna	2019–20	Liga II	9	4	0	0	—		—		9	4
Concordia Chiajna	Total		62	21	1	0	0	0	0	0	63	21
Doxa Katokopia	2018–19	Cypriot First Division	13	6	0	0	—		—		13	6
Career total			342	121	23	14	2	0	3	1	370	136

== Honours ==
FC Baia Mare

- Liga III: 2008–09
