= 2000 Cupa Ligii =

Cupa Ligii
Tournament details
- Country: Romania
- Dates: 2000

Final positions
- Champions: Gloria Bistrița
- Runners-up: FCM Bacău

The Cupa Ligii 2000 was the second season of the Romanian football League Cup, the Cupa Ligii. The final took place at Cotroceni Stadium in Bucharest.

== Semi-finals ==
Rapid București	0–1	FCM Bacău

Brașov

Gloria Bistrița	2–1 (a.e.t.)	Petrolul Ploiești

Bacău

== Final ==
June 1st, 2000

Gloria Bistrița	2–2 (a.e.t.)	FCM Bacău
Penalties
	3–1

Cotroceni Stadium, Bucharest
