= Patrice Feussi =

Cameroonian footballer

Personal information
- Full name: Patrice Emery Fongang Feussi
- Date of birth: 3 October 1986 (age 40)
- Place of birth: Bafoussam, Cameroon
- Height: 1.73 m (5 ft 8 in)
- Position: Right winger

Youth career
- 2000–2003: Genoa

Senior career*
| Years | Team | Apps | (Gls) |
| 2003–2006 | Genoa | 4 | (0) |
| 2004–2005 | → Salernitana (loan) | 2 | (0) |
| 2005–2006 | → Perugia (loan) | 16 | (0) |
| 2006–2009 | Pisa | 39 | (0) |
| 2007 | → Pizzighettone (loan) | 12 | (0) |
| 2009–2010 | Sorrento | 7 | (1) |
| 2010 | Genoa | 2 | (0) |
| 2010–2011 | Lugano | 16 | (2) |
| 2012–2014 | UTA Arad | 18 | (0) |
| 2014–2015 | Târgu Mureș | 24 | (0) |
| 2015 | Dinamo București | 11 | (0) |
| 2016–2017 | Concordia Chiajna | 38 | (1) |

International career
- Cameroon U-15
- * Club domestic league appearances and goals as of 28 April 2019

Patrice Emery Fongang Feussi (born 3 October 1986) is a Cameroonian former footballer who played as a right winger.

== Biography ==
=== Genoa ===
Born in Bafoussam, Cameroon, Feussi started his career at Italian Serie B team Genoa, which he arrived in 2000. He made his Serie B debut on 31 May 2003. He was injured in September and missed nine months.

In July 2004 he was loaned to Serie B team Salernitana along with Antonio Ghomsi. However Feussi failed to play in any games. In June 2005 he was initially loaned to Perugia along with Ghomsi and Maurizio Lanzaro. However, due to Caso Genoa, Genoa relegated to Serie C1 and Feussi remained. He played once for "The Griffin" in September before loaned to Perugia again on 7 September, along with Ghomsi and Rodrigue Boisfer.

=== Pisa ===
Feussi was transferred to Serie C1 Pisa in July 2006 on free transfer. He played six times in 2006–07 Serie C1 before loaned to Pizzighettone in January 2007. He followed the team promoted to 2007–08 Serie B and played 33 Serie B games for Pisa.

=== Sorrento & Lugano ===
After Pisa bankrupted at the end of 2008–09 Serie B, Feussi was without a club for a few months, and in November signed by Prima Divisione team Sorrento. However, he terminated his contract in January 2010 in order to re-join Genoa. However, he was immediately left for Swiss Challenge League club Lugano (a sister club of Genoa) on 30 January in order to exchange a non-EU registration quota for Danijel Aleksić who was signed from Serbia. Genoa also recalled Steve Pinau from Lugano in order to borrow to French. Feussi played 1 1/2 seasons for the Challenge League club, and released on 30 June 2011.
