= Ezequiel Filipetto =

Argentine footballer

Personal information
- Full name: Ezequiel Nicolás Filipetto
- Date of birth: December 9, 1987 (age 38)
- Place of birth: San Justo, Argentina
- Height: 1.81 m (5 ft 11 in)
- Position: Centre-back

Team information
- Current team: Estudiantes SL

Youth career
- Vélez Sarsfield
- Huracán

Senior career*
Years	Team	Apps	(Gls)
2008–2012	Huracán	65	(2)
2012–2014	Almirante Brown	21	(1)
2014–2015	Universitario	59	(0)
2015	Pandurii Târgu Jiu	16	(2)
2016	Deportivo Cuenca	39	(4)
2017	Zamora	12	(1)
2017–2018	Alvarado	3	(0)
2018–2019	Barracas Central	36	(1)
2020–2021	Barracas Central	8	(0)
2021	San Telmo	11	(1)
2022–	Estudiantes SL	11	(2)
- * Club domestic league appearances and goals as of 14:13, 1 August 2022 (UTC)

Ezequiel Nicolás Filipetto (born 9 December 1987) is an Argentine footballer who plays as a centre-back for Sportivo Estudiantes.

== Career ==
Filipetto made his professional debut for Huracán on 13 December 2008 in a 3–0 home win against Vélez Sarsfield. During the Apertura 2009 tournament he became a regular first team player and scored his first goal for the club on 3 October 2009 against Racing.
