= Adrian Viciu =

Romanian footballer

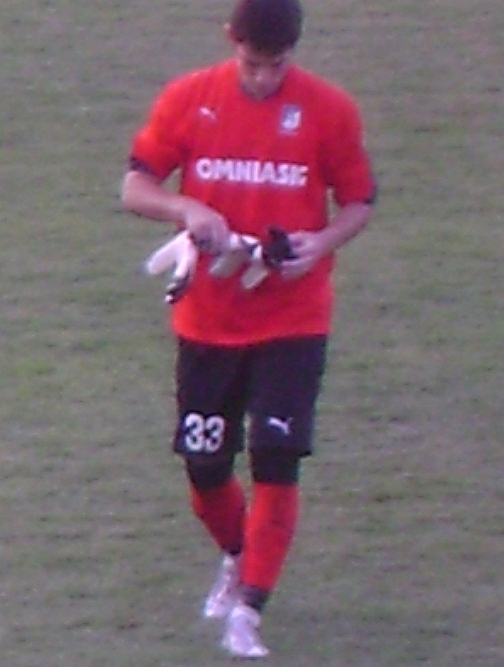

Personal information
- Full name: Ioan Adrian Viciu
- Date of birth: 14 January 1991 (age 35)
- Place of birth: Târgu Mureș, Romania
- Height: 1.89 m (6 ft 2 in)
- Position: Goalkeeper

Youth career
- 2003–2004: Dinamo București
- 2004–2006: Liberty Salonta
- 2006–2007: Cádiz CF

Senior career*
| Years | Team | Apps | (Gls) |
| 2007–2008 | Cádiz CF B | 18 | (0) |
| 2008–2009 | FCM Târgu Mureș | 8 | (0) |
| 2009–2011 | Sportul Studențesc | 40 | (0) |
| 2012–2013 | Săgeata Năvodari | 13 | (0) |
| 2013–2017 | ASA Târgu Mureș | 8 | (0) |
- * Club domestic league appearances and goals as of 11 January 2017

Ioan Adrian Viciu (born 14 January 1991 in Târgu Mureș) is a Romanian football player who plays as a goalkeeper.
