= Vytautas Černiauskas =

Lithuanian footballer

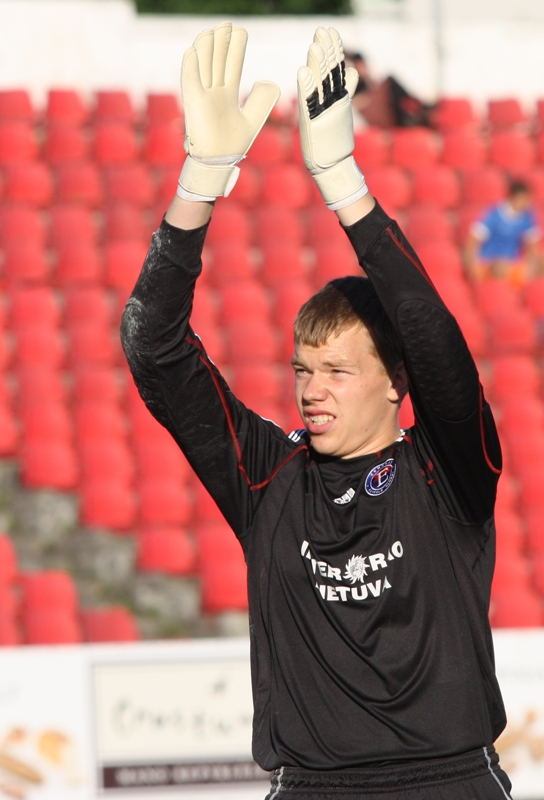
- Černiauskas with Ekranas in 2010

Personal information
- Full name: Vytautas Gediminas Černiauskas
- Date of birth: 12 March 1989 (age 37)
- Place of birth: Panevėžys, Lithuania
- Height: 1.90 m (6 ft 3 in)
- Position: Goalkeeper

Team information
- Current team: Panevėžys
- Number: 1

Youth career
- 2006–2008: Ekranas-2

Senior career*
Years	Team	Apps	(Gls)
2008–2010	Ekranas	59	(0)
2010–2014	Vaslui	54	(0)
2014–2015	Korona Kielce	35	(0)
2015–2016	Dinamo București	34	(0)
2016	Ermis Aradippou	2	(0)
2017	Dinamo București	5	(0)
2017–2020	CSKA Sofia	75	(0)
2021–2022	RFS	49	(0)
2023–	Panevėžys	130	(0)

International career^{‡}
2006–2007	Lithuania U17	1	(0)
2007–2008	Lithuania U19	5	(0)
2009–2011	Lithuania U21	15	(0)
2014–	Lithuania	6	(0)
- * Club domestic league appearances and goals as of 28 February 2026 ‡ National team caps and goals as of 2 March 2024

Vytautas Černiauskas (born 12 March 1989) is a Lithuanian professional footballer who plays as a goalkeeper for A Lyga club Panevėžys.

== Career ==
He played for four seasons at FC Vaslui, in Romanian Liga I.

In 2016 Černiauskas signed contract with Cyprian club Ermis Aradippou, but he left team in December due to a disagreement with club director.

On 22 February 2017 Vytautas Černiauskas returned to the Dinamo București as a replacement for the injured Laurențiu Brănescu. He left the club after the victory of 2016–17 Cupa Ligii.

On 30 June 2017, he signed a 2-year contract with Bulgarian First League club CSKA Sofia. Černiauskas signed another 2-year contract extension on 14 January 2019 and sat on the bench.

== Statistics ==
As of 28 April 2024

Club	Season	League		Cup		Europe		Other		Total	
Club	Season	Apps	C.S.	Apps	C.S.	Apps	C.S.	Apps	C.S.	Apps	C.S.
Ekranas	2008	19	13	1	0	1	0	0	0	21	13
Ekranas	2009	25	14	1	0	2	0	1	1	29	15
Ekranas	2010	15	8	4	1	1	1	0	0	20	10
Ekranas	Total	59	35	6	1	4	1	1	1	70	38
Vaslui	2010–11	4	1	0	0	0	0	0	0	4	1
Vaslui	2011–12	17	8	0	0	10	4	0	0	27	12
Vaslui	2012–13	8	3	0	0	0	0	0	0	8	3
Vaslui	2013–14	25	12	3	1	0	0	0	0	28	13
Vaslui	Total	54	24	3	1	10	4	0	0	67	29
Korona Kielce	2014–15	35	6	1	0	0	0	0	0	36	6
Korona Kielce	Total	35	6	1	0	0	0	0	0	35	6
Dinamo București	2015–16	34	13	5	1	0	0	0	0	39	14
Dinamo București	Total	34	13	5	1	0	0	0	0	39	14
Ermis Aradippou	2016–17	2	0	0	0	0	0	0	0	2	0
Ermis Aradippou	Total	2	0	5	1	0	0	0	0	2	0
Dinamo București	2016–17	5	1	1	1	0	0	0	0	6	2
Dinamo București	Total	5	1	1	1	0	0	0	0	6	2
CSKA Sofia	2017–18	34	18	3	0	0	0	0	0	37	18
CSKA Sofia	2018–19	34	16	3	1	6	2	0	0	43	19
CSKA Sofia	2019–20	7	11	0	0	0	6	3	0	13	14
CSKA Sofia	Total	75	45	6	1	12	5	0	0	93	51
RFS	2021	27	10	3	3	6	1	0	0	36	14
RFS	2022	22	9	2	1	1	0	0	0	25	10
RFS	Total	49	19	5	4	7	1	0	0	61	24
Panevėzys	2023	35	24	0	0	6	1	0	0	41	25
Panevėzys	2024	10	4	0	0	4	0	1	1	15	5
Panevėzys	Total	45	28	0	0	10	1	1	1	56	30
Career total		358	170	27	10	43	12	2	2	430	194

== Honours ==
Ekranas

- A Lyga: 2008, 2009, 2010
- Lithuanian Cup: 2010

Vaslui

- Liga I runner-up: 2011–12

Dinamo București

- Cupa României runner-up: 2015–16
- Cupa Ligii: 2016–17

CSKA Sofia

- Bulgarian Cup runner-up: 2019–20

RFS

- Virslīga: 2021
- Latvian Cup: 2021

Panevėžys

- A Lyga: 2023
- Lithuanian Supercup: 2024
- Lithuanian Cup: 2025
