= Romario Kortzorg =

Dutch footballer

Personal information
- Date of birth: 25 August 1989 (age 37)
- Place of birth: Rotterdam, Netherlands
- Height: 1.78 m (5 ft 10 in)
- Position: Forward

Team information
- Current team: Nam Định
- Number: 11

Senior career*
Years	Team	Apps	(Gls)
2009–2011	RVVH Hercules	60	(17)
2012	AGOVV Apeldoorn	14	(4)
2013	Dordrecht	4	(0)
2013–2014	Botev Plovdiv	33	(9)
2014–2015	Erzgebirge Aue	28	(4)
2015–2016	Târgu Mureș	14	(1)
2016	Dinamo București	9	(1)
2016	Astra Giurgiu	9	(0)
2017	Concordia Chiajna	9	(0)
2018	Becamex Bình Dương	12	(3)
2018	Nam Định	2	(0)
Total		194	(39)
- * Club domestic league appearances and goals as of 6 March 2019

Romario Kortzorg (born 25 August 1989 in Rotterdam) is a Dutch footballer who plays as a forward for Vietnamese club Nam Định. His name is Romario because his father was a fan of the Brazilian International footballer Romário.

On 30 April 2013, Kortzorg agreed a deal to sign for Botev Plovdiv for an undisclosed fee. In July 2014 he joined German club Erzgebirge Aue.

== Personal life ==
Born in the Netherlands, Kortzorg is of Surinamese descent.

== Honours ==
=== Club ===
ASA Târgu Mureș

- Romanian Supercup: 2015
