= Ante Puljić =

Croatian footballer

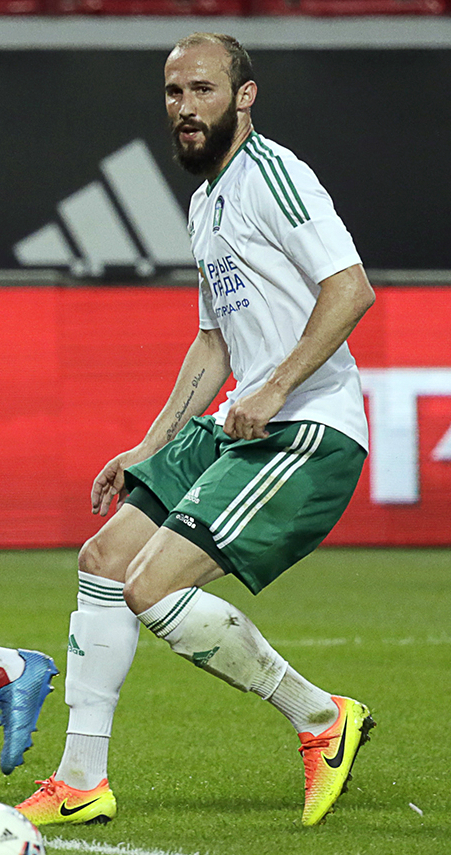

Personal information
- Date of birth: 5 November 1987 (age 39)
- Place of birth: Mostar, SFR Yugoslavia
- Height: 1.87 m (6 ft 2 in)
- Position: Centre back

Team information
- Current team: Rugvica Sava 1976

Youth career
- –2005: HNK Ljubuški
- 2005–2006: Hajduk Split

Senior career*
Years	Team	Apps	(Gls)
2006–2011	Zadar	106	(4)
2011–2012	Lokomotiva Zagreb	8	(0)
2011	→ Dinamo Zagreb (loan)	1	(0)
2012–2013	Dinamo Zagreb	10	(1)
2013	→ Lokomotiva Zagreb (loan)	8	(2)
2013	Lokomotiva Zagreb	15	(1)
2014–2016	Gent	18	(1)
2015–2016	→ Dinamo București	21	(1)
2016–2018	Tom Tomsk	44	(7)
2018–2019	Al-Faisaly	21	(3)
2019–2021	Dinamo București	55	(2)
2021–2023	Bnei Sakhnin	58	(4)
2024–2025	Kustošija		
2025–	Rugvica Sava 1976		
- * Club domestic league appearances and goals as of 15 May 2023

Ante Puljić (born 5 November 1987) is a Croatian footballer who plays as defender for Rugvica Sava 1976.

== Career ==
Born in Mostar in Bosnia and Herzegovina, Puljić spent most of his career in Croatia, first passing through the ranks of Hajduk Split's academy, and them joining second-level side Zadar on a free transfer in the summer of 2006. After establishing himself as a first team regular and helping the club win promotion to top level at the end of the 2006–07 season, Puljić went on to spend the following five seasons at the club making 106 first league appearances for Zadar.

In July 2011 his contract at Zadar ended and he signed for NK Lokomotiva Zagreb and after only one appearance for Lokomotiva in the 2010–11 Prva HNL season, he was transferred on a year-long loan to GNK Dinamo Zagreb in August, but was returned to Lokomotiva in January 2012. On 23 December he signed a contract binding him to KAA Gent till 2017, starting 3 January 2014.

In September 2019, he signed a contract with Dinamo București.

== Statistics ==
As of 9 April 2021

Season	Team	Competition	Competition		Cup		International		Total	
Season	Team	Competition	Apps	Goals	Apps	Goals	Apps	Goals	Apps	Goals
2007–08	NK Zadar	1.HNL	29	1	0	0	0	0	29	1
2008–09	NK Zadar	1.HNL	25	2	0	0	0	0	25	2
2009–10	NK Zadar	1.HNL	23	0	0	0	0	0	23	0
2010–11	NK Zadar	1.HNL	29	1	0	0	0	0	29	1
2011–12	Lokomotiva Zagreb	1.HNL	8	0	0	0	0	0	8	0
2011–12	→Dinamo Zagreb	1.HNL	1	0	0	0	0	0	1	0
2012–13	Dinamo Zagreb	1.HNL	10	1	2	0	3	0	15	1
2012–13	→Lokomotiva Zagreb	1.HNL	8	2	2	0	0	0	10	2
2013–14	→Lokomotiva Zagreb	1.HNL	15	1	0	0	0	0	15	1
2013–14	AA Gent	Jupiler Pro League	14	1	2	0	0	0	16	1
2014–15	AA Gent	Jupiler Pro League	4	0	0	0	0	0	4	0
2015–16	AA Gent	Jupiler Pro League	0	0	0	0	0	0	0	0
2015–16	→Dinamo București	Liga I	21	1	7 (Note: Includes one match in the 2015–16 Cupa Ligii)	1	0	0	28	2
2016–17	Tom Tomsk	Russian Premier League	10	0	0	0	0	0	10	0
2017–18	Tom Tomsk	Russian Football National League	34	7	2	0	0	0	36	7
2018–19	Al-Faisaly	Saudi Professional League	21	3	0	0	0	0	21	3
2019–20	Dinamo București	Liga I	22	1	4	0	0	0	26	1
2020–21	Dinamo București	Liga I	25	1	3	0	0	0	26	1
2021–22	Bnei Sakhnin	Israeli Premier League	28	2	2	0	0	0	30	2
2022–23	Bnei Sakhnin	Israeli Premier League	30	3	2	0	5	0	37	3
Career total			357	27	26	1	8	0	391	28

== Honours ==
KAA Gent

- Belgian First Division: 2014–15
