= Ricky van Haaren =

Dutch footballer

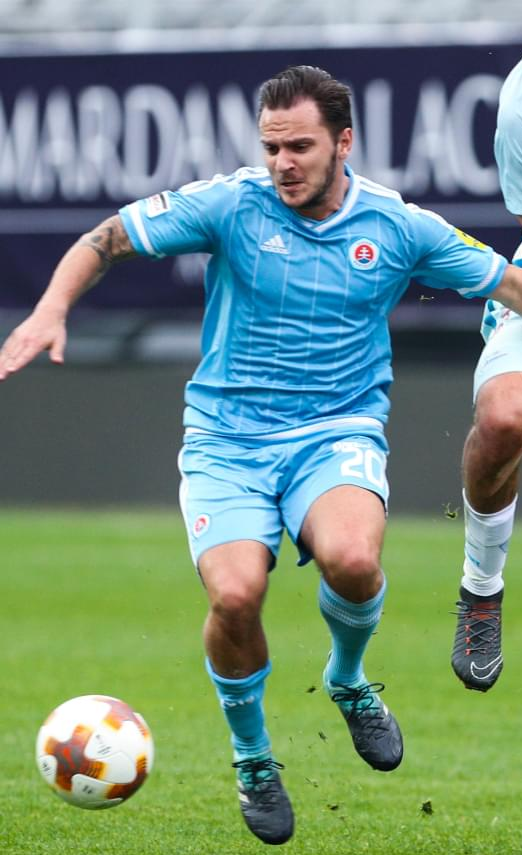
- van Haaren with Slovan in 2018

Personal information
- Date of birth: 21 June 1991 (age 35)
- Place of birth: Rotterdam, Netherlands
- Height: 1.77 m (5 ft 10 in)
- Position: Midfielder

Youth career
- Excelsior
- Feyenoord

Senior career*
Years	Team	Apps	(Gls)
2010–2012	Feyenoord	21	(1)
2012–2013	VVV-Venlo	31	(0)
2013–2015	ADO Den Haag	27	(1)
2014–2015	→ Dordrecht (loan)	21	(1)
2015	Dinamo București	8	(0)
2016	Şanlıurfaspor	8	(0)
2016–2017	Dordrecht	16	(3)
2017	AS Trenčín	10	(3)
2018	Slovan Bratislava	2	(1)
2019–2020	Olimpia Grudziądz	18	(2)
2020–2022	Quick Boys	28	(2)
2023–2024	CSV Zwarte Pijl		
Total		190	(14)

International career
2007–2008	Netherlands U17	10	(0)
2009–2010	Netherlands U19	10	(4)
2010–2013	Netherlands U21	9	(1)
- * Club domestic league appearances and goals

Ricky van Haaren (Dutch pronunciation: [ˈrɪki vɑn ˈɦaːrə(n)]; born 21 June 1991) is a Dutch former professional footballer who plays as a midfielder.

== Club career ==
=== Youth career ===
Van Haaren started his youth career at Excelsior. In the season 2005–06 he was invited to join the Feyenoord Academy. At Varkenoord, the youngster quickly embellished from a reserve player into a youth international. On 28 November 2007, Van Haaren signed a three-year contract with Feyenoord. Feyenoord's technical director Peter Bosz explained: "Firstly we want to prevent him from joining another club. But we also want to reward him because we think he's doing very well. You often see changing performances at this age, but Ricky had a very consistent season last year." Before even playing a single minute for Feyenoord's first team, Van Haaren renewed his contract till 2012 on 16 February 2010. New technical director Leo Beenhakker claimed to have big plans with the young midfielder. One week after renewing his contract, Van Haaren trained with the first team squad for the first time.

=== Feyenoord (2010–2012) ===
Van Haaren made his official debut for Feyenoord's first team on 2 May 2010. He replaced Schenkeveld in the 61st minute in the Eredivisie home match against Heerenveen (6–2). Van Haaren was the fourth player of Feyenoord U19 to make his first team debut this season, after Stefan de Vrij, Luc Castaignos and Bart Schenkeveld.

=== VVV-Venlo (2012–2013) ===
In June 2012 Van Haaren left Feyenoord on a free transfer to sign a two-year contract with VVV-Venlo.

=== ADO Den Haag (2013–2015) ===
After the relegation of VVV-Venlo, Van Haaren signed with ADO Den Haag to continue playing in the Eredivisie. He scored twice on his debut in a 4–2 defeat away to Feyenoord.

==== FC Dordrecht (2014–2015) ====
On 5 August 2014, Van Haaren was sent on loan to Dordrecht until the end of the season.

=== Dinamo București (2015) ===
In June 2015, van Haaren signed a contract for two seasons with Dinamo București. In the middle of August 2015, the Dinamo București coach, Mircea Rednic said it would be best if the player left the club, as he did not show him anything of value so far. He blamed the short summer preseason preparation time for the mistakes in the current squad selection, while also saying that for foreign players, it is imperative that they show they have something "extra" to the normal Romanian players if they are to stay.

In December 2015, van Haaren ended his contract with Dinamo, after playing in only eight games in Liga I, four of them as a starter.

=== Quick Boys (2020–2022) ===
On 11 August 2020, he joined third-tier Dutch club Quick Boys.

== Statistics ==
Club performance			League		Cup		Continental		Total	
Season	Club	League	Apps	Goals	Apps	Goals	Apps	Goals	Apps	Goals
Netherlands			League		KNVB Cup		Europe		Total	
2009–10	Feyenoord	Eredivisie	1	0	0	0	–		1	0
2010–11	Feyenoord	Eredivisie	12	0	0	0	0	0	12	0
2011–12	Feyenoord	Eredivisie	8	1	1	0	–		9	1
2012–13	VVV-Venlo	Eredivisie	31	0	1	0	–		32	0
2013–14	ADO Den Haag	Eredivisie	27	1	0	0	–		27	1
2014–15	FC Dordrecht	Eredivisie	21	1	2	1	–		23	2
Total	Netherlands		100	3	4	3	1	0	104	4
2015–16	Dinamo București	Liga I	8	0	1	0	–		9	0
Total	Romania		8	0	1	0	0	0	9	0
Career total			108	3	4	1	0	0	113	4

Statistics accurate as of last match played on 11 December 2015.

== Personal life ==
His younger brother Danny van Haaren is also a footballer.
