= Valentin Lazăr =

Romanian footballer

Personal information
- Full name: Valentin Marius Lazăr
- Date of birth: 21 August 1989 (age 37)
- Place of birth: Ploiești, Romania
- Height: 1.74 m (5 ft 9 in)
- Position: Right midfielder

Team information
- Current team: Voința Crevedia (head coach)

Youth career
- 1996–2007: Petrolul Ploiești

Senior career*
Years	Team	Apps	(Gls)
2007–2009	Petrolul Ploiești	21	(4)
2009–2011	Chimia Brazi	39	(3)
2011–2013	Sportul Studențesc	42	(6)
2013–2017	Dinamo București	89	(16)
2015	→ Concordia Chiajna (loan)	14	(2)
2017	→ Al-Sailiya (loan)	10	(2)
2017–2019	Al-Sailiya	22	(7)
2018–2019	→ Al Kharaitiyat (loan)	17	(7)
2019–2020	Ümraniyespor	10	(0)
2020	Dinamo București	13	(1)
2020–2021	Al-Shahania	1	(0)
2021	Concordia Chiajna	13	(1)
2022	CSM Reșița	12	(6)
2022	Dinamo București	7	(0)
2023	Păulești	7	(0)
2023–2024	Băicoi	7	(3)
2024–	Bănești-Urleta	6	(8)

Managerial career
- 2023–2025: Băicoi
- 2025–: Voința Crevedia
- * Club domestic league appearances and goals as of 16:08, 27 December 2024 (UTC)

Valentin Marius Lazăr (born 21 August 1989) is a Romanian professional footballer who plays as a midfielder and a manager, currently in charge of Voința Crevedia.

== Club career ==
=== 2013–14 season ===
In the summer of 2013, Lazăr signed a contract for three years with Dinamo București. He made his debut on 19 July in a match against Poli Timișoara. He scored his first goal in a match against Chindia Târgoviște in the Cupa României and a second goal against FC Brașov. In 2014, he scored against Corona Brașov and two goals against Săgeata Năvodari in Liga I. He scored and assisted against big rival Steaua București in the Romanian cup. Lazăr ended the 2013–14 season with 6 goals and 11 assists in all competitions.

=== 2014–15 season ===
On 20 July, Lazăr became the new captain after Laurențiu Rus was released from Dinamo. In the first match against Chiajna in the Cupa Ligii, Lazăr scored a goal. In a match against Universitatea Cluj, Lazăr scored a goal to put Dinamo 2–1 ahead and assisted for 3–1. In the match against Concordia Chiajna, Lazăr was sent off in the 76th minute.

=== 2015–16 season ===
In September, Lazăr was loaned to Concordia Chiajna. After four months, the technical director of Dinamo București announced that Lazar was called back from his loan.

== Honours ==
Dinamo București

- Cupa României runner-up: 2015–16

CSM Reșița

- Liga III: 2021–22

Individual

- DigiSport Liga I Player of the Month: October 2016
