= Sergiu Hanca =

Romanian footballer (born 1992)

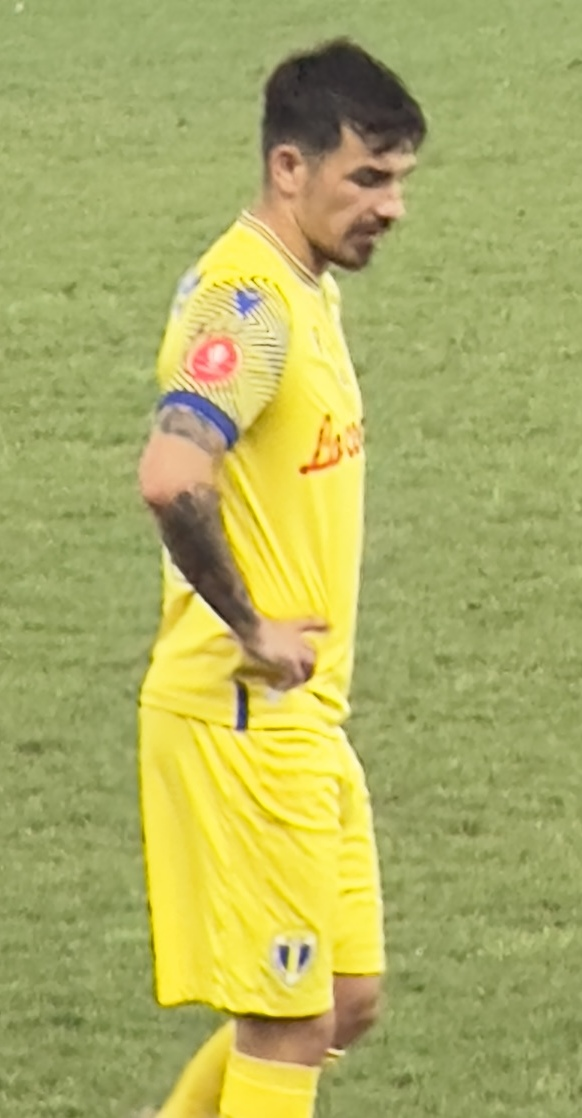
- Hanca with Petrolul Ploiești in 2023

Personal information
- Full name: Sergiu Cătălin Hanca
- Date of birth: 4 April 1992 (age 34)
- Place of birth: Târgu Mureș, Romania
- Height: 1.82 m (6 ft 0 in)
- Positions: Winger; right-back

Team information
- Current team: Petrolul Ploiești
- Number: 20

Youth career
- –2009: FCM Târgu Mureș

Senior career*
Years	Team	Apps	(Gls)
2009–2011	Snagov	38	(1)
2012	Bihor Oradea	1	(0)
2012–2015	ASA Târgu Mureș	68	(4)
2016–2019	Dinamo București	95	(17)
2019–2022	Cracovia	102	(19)
2022–2023	Universitatea Craiova	10	(1)
2023–	Petrolul Ploiești	102	(2)

International career^{‡}
2017–2022	Romania	7	(0)
- * Club domestic league appearances and goals as of 6 November 2026 ‡ National team caps and goals as of 11 June 2022

Sergiu Cătălin Hanca (Romanian pronunciation: [ˈserd͡ʒju kətəˈlin ˈhaŋka]; born 4 April 1992) is a Romanian professional footballer who plays as a winger or a right-back for Liga I club Petrolul Ploiești.

Hanca began his senior career with spells at Snagov, Bihor Oradea, and his hometown club ASA Târgu Mureș, before making a name for himself at Dinamo București. He moved abroad for the first time by signing with Cracovia in 2019, for which he appeared in over 100 Ekstraklasa matches. Three years later, Hanca returned to Romania at Universitatea Craiova.

Internationally, Hanca recorded his debut for Romania in June 2017, in a 1–3 FIFA World Cup qualifier loss to Poland.

== Club career ==
=== Early career ===
Hanca played football as a youngster for his hometown club FCM Târgu Mureș. In 2009, he joined Liga II team Snagov, for which he amassed 38 league games and one goal. At the start of 2012, Hanca had a brief stint at Bihor Oradea.

=== Return to Târgu Mureș ===
During mid-2012, Hanca was brought back by his former youth side FCM Târgu Mureș. He made 22 appearances and scored two goals during the 2013–14 season, as his team achieved promotion to the Liga I.

On 8 July 2015, Hanca won his first career trophy after his club—which was renamed ASA Târgu Mureș—defeated FC Steaua București 1–0 in the Supercupa României. He recorded his debut in European competitions on 6 August 2015, starting in a 2–1 away victory over Saint-Étienne in the Europa League play-off round.

=== Dinamo București ===
On 8 January 2016, Hanca signed a three-and-a-half-year contract with fellow Liga I team Dinamo București. He made his official debut for "the Red Dogs" in a 1–0 league win over Botoșani, on 14 February. On 17 May, he started in the Cupa României final played against CFR Cluj, which Dinamo lost 4–5 at the penalty shootout.

Hanca scored his first goal on 17 October 2016, in a 2–1 victory against Universitatea Craiova in the Liga I. On the 30th the next month, he converted a penalty in a 3–1 derby defeat of FC Steaua București. On 20 May 2017, he won the Cupa Ligii trophy after his side defeated ACS Poli Timișoara 2–0 in the final.

=== Cracovia ===
Sergiu Hanca joined Cracovia in January 2019, transferring from Dinamo București for a fee reportedly around €60,000. His debut for Cracovia in February 2019 he scored the winning goal in a 2–1 victory over Piast Gliwice. His performances made him one of the team’s top contributors, and ahead of a season he was named captain of Cracovia reflecting his importance on and off the pitch.

By mid‑2022, after roughly three and a half seasons, he had made around 115 appearances, scored 19 goals, and provided 20 assists for Cracovia in all competitions, according to Romanian media reporting his departure.

In summer 2022, Hanca left Cracovia and returned to Romania.

=== Universitatea Craiova ===
On 29 July 2022, Hanca returned to Romania and its Liga I by signing a three-year deal with Universitatea Craiova. He scored his only goal in a 2–1 local derby win over FC U Craiova, on 7 August.

Hanca soon fell out of favour with head coach Mirel Rădoi and the club's directors, being sent to the reserve team and suing them for €2 million. He terminated his contract on 18 June 2023, after receiving €120,000 in compensations.

=== Petrolul Ploiești ===
On 5 July 2023, Hanca agreed to a contract with Petrolul Ploiești.

== International career ==
In March 2017, Hanca was selected by manager Christoph Daum in Romania's squad for a 2018 FIFA World Cup qualifier against Denmark. On 10 June that year, he made his debut by coming on as a substitute in a 1–3 loss to Poland in the same competition.

== Personal life ==
Hanca married his girlfriend Andreea in May 2016, and their wedding took place in Târgu Mureș in the summer of the same year. The couple is known for its charity work.

== Career statistics ==
=== Club ===
As of match played 6 November 2026

Appearances and goals by club, season and competition
Club	Season	League			National Cup (Note: Includes Cupa României, Polish Cup)		Europe		Other		Total	
Club	Season	Division	Apps	Goals	Apps	Goals	Apps	Goals	Apps	Goals	Apps	Goals
Snagov	2009–10	Liga II	8	0	0	0	—		—		8	0
Snagov	2010–11	Liga II	21	1	0	0	—		—		21	1
Snagov	2011–12	Liga II	9	0	0	0	—		—		9	0
Snagov	Total		38	1	0	0	—		—		38	1
Bihor Oradea	2011–12	Liga II	1	0	—		—		—		1	0
ASA Târgu Mureș	2012–13	Liga II	22	2	2	0	—		—		24	2
ASA Târgu Mureș	2013–14	Liga II	22	2	1	0	—		—		13	2
ASA Târgu Mureș	2013–14	Liga I	7	0	0	0	—		0	0	7	0
ASA Târgu Mureș	2015–16	Liga I	17	0	3	0	1 (Note: Appearances in UEFA Europa League)	0	2 (Note: One appearance in Supercupa României, oen appearance in Cupa Ligii)	0	23	0
ASA Târgu Mureș	Total		68	4	6	0	1	0	2	0	77	4
Dinamo București	2015–16	Liga I	11	0	3	0	—		1 (Note: Appearances in Cupa Ligii)	0	15	0
Dinamo București	2016–17	Liga I	33	9	3	0	—		5	3	41	12
Dinamo București	2017–18	Liga I	33	6	3	0	2	0	—		38	6
Dinamo București	2018–19	Liga I	18	2	2	0	—		—		20	2
Dinamo București	Total		95	17	11	0	2	0	6	3	114	20
Cracovia	2018–19	Ekstraklasa	16	2	—		—		—		16	2
Cracovia	2019–20	Ekstraklasa	34	9	5	0	2	0	—		41	9
Cracovia	2020–21	Ekstraklasa	21	4	4	0	1	0	0	0	26	4
Cracovia	2021–22	Ekstraklasa	31	4	1	0	—		—		32	4
Cracovia	2022–23	Ekstraklasa	0	0	—		—		—		0	0
Cracovia	Total		102	19	10	0	3	0	0	0	115	19
Universitatea Craiova	2022–23	Liga I	10	1	2	0	4 (Note: Appearances in UEFA Conference League)	0	—		16	1
Petrolul Ploiești	2023–24	Liga I	30	0	0	0	—		—		30	0
Petrolul Ploiești	2024–25	Liga I	31	1	4	2	—		—		35	3
Petrolul Ploiești	2025–26	Liga I	28	1	3	1	—		—		31	2
Petrolul Ploiești	2026–27	Liga I	13	0	2	0	—		—		15	0
Petrolul Ploiești	Total		102	2	9	3	—		—		111	4
Career total			416	44	38	3	10	0	8	3	472	50

=== International ===
As of match played 11 June 2022

Appearances and goals by national team and year
National team	Year	Apps	Goals
Romania
Romania	2017	4	0
Romania	2020	1	0
Romania	2022	2	0
Total		7	0

== Honours ==
ASA Târgu Mureș

- Supercupa României: 2015

Dinamo București

- Cupa României runner-up: 2015–16
- Cupa Ligii: 2016–17

Cracovia

- Polish Cup: 2019–20
- Polish Super Cup: 2020

Individual

- Liga I Team of the Season: 2016–17
- Digi Sport Liga I Player of the Month: April 2017, August 2017
