= Aljoša Vojnović =

Croatian sports journalist and pundit

Personal information
- Date of birth: 24 October 1985 (age 40)
- Place of birth: Osijek, SR Croatia, SFR Yugoslavia
- Height: 1.81 m (5 ft 11 1/2 in)
- Position: Defensive midfielder

Youth career
- 1995–2003: Osijek

Senior career*
Years	Team	Apps	(Gls)
2003–2007	Osijek	41	(4)
2003–2005	→ Metalac Osijek (loan)	49	(13)
2007	Raufoss	9	(4)
2008	Kärnten	11	(3)
2008–2009	Croatia Sesvete	28	(4)
2009–2012	Slaven Belupo	56	(7)
2012	Mes Kerman	14	(1)
2012–2014	RNK Split	71	(7)
2015	Osijek	15	(6)
2015	Dinamo București	19	(1)
2016–2018	Osijek	43	(3)
2017–2018	→ Istra 1961 (loan)	23	(2)
2018–2019	Zalaegerszeg	7	(2)
2019	Kaposvár	2	(0)
Total		388	(56)

International career
2004–2007	Croatia U21	14	(3)
- * Club domestic league appearances and goals as of 25 August 2019

Aljoša Vojnović (born 24 October 1985) is a Croatian retired footballer. He currently works as a columnist for Telesport and as a pundit at Nova TV.

== Club career ==
Aljoša Vojnović started his professional career in NK Osijek. In NK Osijek he was not in the first team plans so he tried his luck abroad. He was on try outs in a famous German club TSV 1860 München where the coach Marco Kurz said "he left a good impression on him". The transfer didn't go through. Later on, he tried getting an acquisition in some other clubs. First, in Norwegian club Raufoss Fotball and second, in Austrian Kärnten. Although he did spend a whole year in Kärnten (where he scored a few times) he returned to Croatia in the season 2008–2009 by signing a contract with newly promoted Croatia Sesvete. Some good performances and 4 goals in the Prva HNL which made him the club's second best scorer earned him a contract with NK Slaven Belupo.

On 25 June 2009 NK Slaven Belupo have announced that they have signed young striker Aljoša Vojnović from NK Croatia Sesvete on a three-year contract worth €50 000. NK Slaven Belupo will also have to pay a percentage of players future transfer to NK Croatia Sesvete.

After his three years in Slaven, and a spell in Iran, Vojnović moved to RNK Split where he, a striker at the beginning of his career, established himself further as a defensive midfielder.

In the first days of 2015, he moved back to his first club, NK Osijek, only to move later that year to Dinamo București where he became captain. He was released from Dinamo in December 2015.
