= Gabriel Abraham =

Romanian footballer

Personal information
- Date of birth: 22 March 1991 (age 35)
- Place of birth: Galați, Romania
- Height: 1.85 m (6 ft 1 in)
- Position: Goalkeeper

Senior career*
Years	Team	Apps	(Gls)
2010–2015	Oțelul Galați	11	(0)
2012–2013	→ ASA Târgu Mureș (loan)	12	(0)
2015	Dinamo București	0	(0)

International career
2009	Romania U-19	1	(0)
- * Club domestic league appearances and goals as of 9 July 2015

Gabriel Abraham (born 22 March 1991 in Galați) is a Romanian footballer who plays as a goalkeeper. He is a free agent.
