= Antonio Ghomsi =

Cameroonian footballer

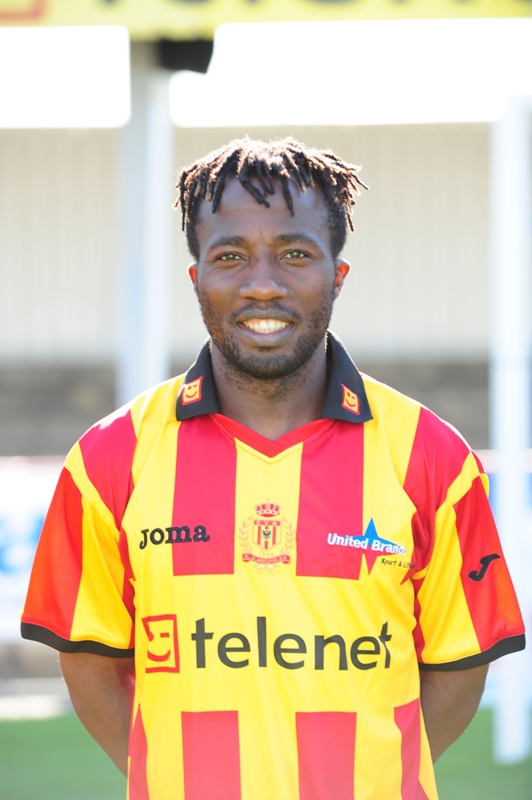

Personal information
- Date of birth: 22 April 1986 (age 40)
- Place of birth: Bandjoun, Cameroon
- Height: 1.78 m (5 ft 10 in)
- Position: Defender

Senior career*
Years	Team	Apps	(Gls)
2002–2006	Genoa	6	(1)
2004–2005	→ Salernitana (loan)	12	(0)
2005–2006	→ Perugia (loan)	28	(1)
2006–2008	Messina	2	(0)
2007–2008	→ Juve Stabia (loan)	25	(0)
2008–2009	Avellino	16	(0)
2009–2010	Siena	0	(0)
2009–2010	→ K.V. Mechelen (loan)	31	(0)
2010–2015	K.V. Mechelen	109	(0)
2015	Skoda Xanthi	9	(1)
2015	Dinamo București	4	(0)

International career
–2008	Cameroon U23		
- * Club domestic league appearances and goals as of 5 December 2015

Antonio Ghomsi (born 22 April 1986) is a Cameroonian former footballer who played as a left-back.

== Biography ==
Ghomsi started his career at Genoa. In July 2006, he was signed by Messina of Serie A. He made his Serie A debut on 1 October against Livorno. In summer 2007 he left for Juve Stabia of Serie C1. He became a free agent after Messina bankrupted in July 2008. In October 2008, he was signed by Avellino of Serie B on free transfer.

In July 2009, he was signed by A.C. Siena of Serie A. and pending a loan deal to K.V. Mechelen. He made his Belgian First Division debut on 1 August 2009, K.V. Mechelen 4–1 won K.V.C. Westerlo.
