= Ionuț Șerban =

Romanian footballer

Personal information
- Full name: Ionuț Daniel Șerban
- Date of birth: 7 August 1995 (age 31)
- Place of birth: Băicoi, Romania
- Height: 1.78 m (5 ft 10 in)
- Position: Defensive midfielder

Team information
- Current team: Teleajenul Văleni

Youth career
- 2005–2009: Petrolul Ploiești
- 2009–2011: Chimia Brazi

Senior career*
| Years | Team | Apps | (Gls) |
| 2011–2012 | Chimia Brazi | 10 | (1) |
| 2012–2013 | Sportul Studenţesc | 19 | (3) |
| 2013–2021 | Dinamo București | 65 | (1) |
| 2022–2023 | Blejoi | 23 | (1) |
| 2023 | Cetatea Turnu Măgurele | 6 | (0) |
| 2023 | Blejoi | 14 | (2) |
| 2024– | Teleajenul Văleni | 0 | (0) |

International career^{‡}
| 2011 | Romania U-17 | 4 | (0) |
| 2013 | Romania U-18 | 1 | (1) |
| 2013–2014 | Romania U-19 | 11 | (1) |
| 2014 | Romania U-21 | 4 | (0) |
- * Club domestic league appearances and goals as of 17:17, 26 December 2024 (UTC) ‡ National team caps and goals as of 15 November 2014

Ionuț Daniel Șerban (born 7 August 1995) is a Romanian professional footballer who plays as a defensive midfielder for Teleajenul Vălenii de Munte. His first ever goal in Liga I was scored on 20 April 2014, for Dinamo București, in a match against Astra Giurgiu.
