= Vlad Olteanu =

Romanian footballer

Personal information
- Full name: Vlad Alexandru Olteanu
- Date of birth: 21 March 1996 (age 30)
- Place of birth: Braşov, Romania
- Height: 1.80 m (5 ft 11 in)
- Position: Left back

Team information
- Current team: Colțea Brașov
- Number: 96

Youth career
- –2015: Braşov

Senior career*
Years	Team	Apps	(Gls)
2015–2016	Braşov	12	(2)
2016–2019	Dinamo București	35	(0)
2017	→ Sepsi OSK (loan)	11	(0)
2017–2018	→ Voluntari (loan)	12	(0)
2019	→ Poli Timișoara (loan)	15	(0)
2019–2020	Concordia Chiajna	12	(0)
2020	Inter Tărlungeni	0	(0)
2021–2023	SR Brașov	37	(4)
2023–	Colțea Brașov	14	(6)

International career
2014	Romania U-19	3	(0)
2016–2018	Romania U-21	6	(0)
- * Club domestic league appearances and goals as of 20:33, 14 January 2024 (UTC)

Vlad Alexandru Olteanu (born 21 March 1996) is a Romanian footballer who plays as a left back for Colțea Brașov.

== Honours ==
FC Voluntari

- Romanian Supercup: 2017
