= Antun Palić =

Croatian footballer

Personal information
- Date of birth: 25 June 1988 (age 38)
- Place of birth: Zagreb, SR Croatia, SFR Yugoslavia
- Height: 1.77 m (5 ft 9 1/2 in)
- Position: Midfielder

Youth career
- 1999–2007: NK Zagreb

Senior career*
| Years | Team | Apps | (Gls) |
| 2007–2008 | Lučko | 29 | (8) |
| 2008–2009 | Croatia Sesvete | 31 | (3) |
| 2010 | Inter Zaprešić | 23 | (4) |
| 2011 | Dinamo Zagreb | 5 | (0) |
| 2012–2013 | AEK Larnaca | 39 | (5) |
| 2014 | Bangkok United | 11 | (1) |
| 2014–2015 | Krka | 22 | (2) |
| 2015–2017 | Dinamo București | 59 | (5) |
| 2017 | Mouscron | 3 | (0) |
| 2018 | Dinamo București | 10 | (1) |
| 2018–2020 | Sheriff Tiraspol | 22 | (3) |
| 2020 | Kaposvár | 9 | (0) |
| 2020–2022 | Argeș Pitești | 44 | (3) |

International career
| 2007 | Croatia U19 | 1 | (0) |
| 2008–2009 | Croatia U20 | 3 | (1) |
| 2009–2012 | Croatia U21 | 4 | (0) |
- * Club domestic league appearances and goals as of 13 March 2022

Antun Palić (born 25 June 1988) is a Croatian footballer who plays as a midfielder.

== Club career ==
=== NK Zagreb ===
A product of NK Zagreb academy, Palić, after turning professional in July 2007 was sent on loan to third division side NK Lučko where he spent his first senior season. At the end of 2007–08 season Palić returned to NK Zagreb just to be immediately released on free transfer in the summer transfer period, without ever appearing in a single official senior match for NK Zagreb. Release was never explained by Zagreb officials even though Palić was at the time on a wider list of Croatia national under-20 football team.

=== First Division Clubs ===
In July 2008 Palić went on to join NK Croatia Sesvete signing his first professional contract. In a season and half long stay at Croatia Sesvete he made 31 league appearances, adding two more in Croatian Cup competition. He scored only three league goals of which one was particularly valuable, achieved against major Croatian team Hajduk Split on 5 October 2008 at Kranjčevićeva. An early opening goal in the end proved to be the only and crucial one in 1–0 win, resulting in first-ever club victory over Hajduk. In December 2009 club management made a strange move at the time, placing him on transfer list for opening winter transfer window. Especially surprising was timing of decision from the club as Palić was in process of recovery from an injury and was a regular member of Croatia national under-21 football team. Reason was proved later on to be due to the major financial trouble club was going on, finally leading to dissolving the club in 2012 due to financial irregularities. Croatia Sesvete continued to write off players. At the end Palić terminated contract with Croatia on mutual agreement together with his teammates Marijo Jurin and Matija Katanec.

Palić moved to NK Inter Zaprešić in January 2010. After a year in Zaprešić, Palić was signed by Dinamo Zagreb on a 4.5-year contract, but got few chances to play for the club in his first year at the club, and signed for the Cypriot side AEK Larnaca F.C.

== International career ==
Internationally, Palić represented Croatia at under-19, under-20 and Croatia under-21 team.

== Honours ==
=== Club ===
Dinamo Zagreb

- Croatian First League: 2010–11
- Croatian Cup: 2010–11

Dinamo București

- Cupa Ligii: 2016–17

Sheriff Tiraspol

- Moldovan National Division: 2018
