= Cupa Ligii =

Romanian association football tournament

- Founded: 2014
- Abolished: 2017
- Region: Romania
- Teams: 14
- Last champions: Dinamo București (1st title)
- Most championships: FCSB (2 times)
- Broadcaster(s): Look TV; Look Plus; Digi Sport; Dolce Sport
- Website: Cupa Ligii at lpf.ro

The Cupa Ligii (English: League Cup) was Romania's secondary club football tournament. Like the Cupa României, it was played on a knockout (single elimination) basis.

== History ==
It is unclear when the competition was first created, as there are no official recordings. It started in 1994, but there may already have been an edition as early as 1978. Cupa Ligii was meant to shorten the break between the end of the league season and the start of a major international competition.

The competition under the name of Samsung Cup was Gheorghe Copos' idea and was held at the end of the 1993-94 season with the 18 teams of the Romanian first division and Rapid Bucharest being the winner and received a financial reward of $100,000.

In April 2014, it was decided to re-establish the competition, this time with official character, starting with the 2014–15 edition. Managed by the Liga Profesionistă de Fotbal (LPF), only teams from the Romanian top division were allowed to take part. FCSB (twice) and Dinamo București were winners of the cup before being abolished again in 2017.

== Finals (1994–2000) ==
Season	Winner	Score	Runner-up	Venue
1994	FC Rapid București	5–1	UTA Arad	Stadionul Francisc von Neuman, Arad
1998	FCM Bacău	3–2 (a.e.t.)	Universitatea Cluj	ANEFS Stadium, Bucharest
2000	Gloria Bistrița	2–2 (a.e.t.) 3–1 (pen.)	FCM Bacău	Cotroceni Stadium, Bucharest

== Finals (2014–2017) ==
There were three previous, cups held in 1994, 1998 and 2000. Those were won by Rapid București, FCM Bacău and Gloria Bistrița.

Season	Winner	Score	Runner-up	Venue
2014–15	Steaua București	3–0	Pandurii Târgu Jiu	Arena Națională, Bucharest
2015–16	Steaua București	2–1 (a.e.t.)	Concordia Chiajna	Arena Națională, Bucharest
2016–17	Dinamo București	2–0	ACS Poli Timișoara	Arena Națională, Bucharest

== Broadcasters ==
From the 2014–15 season to the 2018–19 season, sister channels Look TV and Look Plus were meant to broadcast Cupa Ligii. The matches could have also been viewed on Digi Sport and Dolce Sport.
