= FC Astra Giurgiu in European football =

- Club: Astra Giurgiu
- First entry: 2013–14 UEFA Europa League
- Latest entry: 2017–18 UEFA Europa League

Asociația Fotbal Club Astra Giurgiu is a Romanian professional football club based in Giurgiu, Giurgiu County. The club have participated in 4 editions of the club competitions governed by UEFA, three in Europa League and one in Champions League. In 2013–14 season, they managed to qualify for the group stages of Europa League for the first time, after defeating French giants Olympique Lyon; they finished fourth in a group against Red Bull Salzburg, Celtic, and Dinamo Zagreb. In 2016–17, they knocked out English side West Ham United, after 2–2 at London and 2–1 at Giurgiu.

In 2015–16 Liga I the club managed to win the title for the first time in their history; that meant qualification to the 2015–16 UEFA Champions League third qualifying round. The club drew FC København, and couldn't manage to win the tie after drawing 1–1 in Giurgiu and losing 0–3 in Copenhagen against the Danish team.

In the Europa League play-off Astra was drawn against English side West Ham United and managed to eliminate them for the second successive season, by winning 1–0 at the Olympic Stadium after having drawn 1–1 at home.

After qualifying, the club was seeded in Group E against AS Roma, Viktoria Plzen, and Austria Wien. Astra managed to come second after a tight group and qualified for the round of 32 where they played against Belgian side KRC Genk.

== All-time statistics ==
As of 3 August 2017

Competition	S	P	W	D	L	GF	GA	GD
UEFA Champions League	1	2	0	1	1	1	4	–3
UEFA Europa League	5	38	15	12	11	48	50	–2
Total	6	40	15	13	12	49	54	–5

== Opponents ==
Country	Club	P	W	D	L	GF	GA	GD
Austria	Austria Wien	2	1	0	1	4	4	0
Austria	Red Bull Salzburg	2	0	0	2	2	7	–5
Subtotal		4	1	0	3	6	11	–5
Azerbaijan	Zira	2	1	1	0	3	1	+2
Subtotal		2	1	1	0	3	1	+2
Belgium	Genk	2	0	1	1	2	3	–1
Subtotal		2	0	1	1	2	3	–1
Croatia	Dinamo Zagreb	2	1	0	1	2	5	–3
Subtotal		2	1	0	1	2	5	–3
Cyprus	Omonia	2	1	1	0	3	2	+1
Subtotal		2	1	1	0	3	2	+1
Czech Republic	Slovan Liberec	2	2	0	0	6	2	+4
Czech Republic	Viktoria Plzeň	2	1	1	0	3	2	+1
Subtotal		4	3	1	0	9	4	+5
Denmark	Copenhagen	2	0	1	1	1	4	–3
Subtotal		2	0	1	1	1	4	–3
England	West Ham United	4	2	2	0	6	4	+2
Subtotal		4	2	2	0	6	4	+2
France	Lyon	2	1	0	1	2	2	0
Subtotal		2	1	0	1	2	2	0
[Israel	Maccabi Haifa	2	0	1	1	1	3	–2
Subtotal		2	0	1	1	1	3	–2
Italy	Roma	2	0	1	1	0	4	–4
Subtotal		2	0	1	1	0	4	–4
Netherlands	AZ Alkmaar	2	1	0	1	3	4	–1
Subtotal		2	1	0	1	3	4	–1
Scotland	Celtic	2	0	1	1	2	3	–1
Scotland	Inverness	2	1	1	0	1	0	+1
Subtotal		4	1	2	1	3	3	0
Slovenia	Domžale	2	2	0	0	3	0	+3
Subtotal		2	2	0	0	3	0	+3
Slovakia	Trenčín	2	1	1	0	5	3	+2
Subtotal		2	1	1	0	5	3	+2
Ukraine	Oleksandriya	2	0	1	1	0	1	–1
Subtotal		2	0	1	1	0	1	–1
Total		40	15	13	12	49	54	–5

== History of matches ==
Notes for the abbreviations in the tables below:

- 1QR: First qualifying round
- 2QR: Second qualifying round
- 3QR: Third qualifying round
- PO: Play-off round
- R32: Round of 32

Season	Competition	Round	Club	Home	Away	Aggregate
2013–14	UEFA Europa League	1Q	(Slovenia) Domžale	2–0	1–0	3–0
2013–14	UEFA Europa League	2Q	(Cyprus) Omonia	1–1	2–1	3–2
2013–14	UEFA Europa League	3Q	(Slovakia) AS Trenčín	2–2	3–1	5–3
2013–14	UEFA Europa League	PO	(Israel) Maccabi Haifa	1–1	0–2	1–3
2014–15	UEFA Europa League	3Q	(Czech Republic) Slovan Liberec	3–0	3–2	6–2
2014–15	UEFA Europa League	PO	(France) Lyon	0–1	2–1	2–2 (a)
2014–15	UEFA Europa League	Group D	(Austria) Red Bull Salzburg	1–2	1–5	4th
2014–15	UEFA Europa League	Group D	(Scotland) Celtic	1–1	1–2	4th
2014–15	UEFA Europa League	Group D	(Croatia) Dinamo Zagreb	1–0	1–5	4th
2015–16	UEFA Europa League	2Q	(Scotland) Inverness CT	0–0	1–0	1–0
2015–16	UEFA Europa League	3Q	(England) West Ham United	2–1	2–2	4–3
2015–16	UEFA Europa League	PO	(Netherlands) AZ	3–2	0–2	3–4
2016–17	UEFA Champions League	3Q	(Denmark) Copenhagen	1–1	0–3	1–4
2016–17	UEFA Europa League	PO	(England) West Ham United	1–1	1–0	2–1
2016–17	UEFA Europa League	Group E	(Czech Republic) Viktoria Plzeň	1–1	2–1	2nd
2016–17	UEFA Europa League	Group E	(Italy) Roma	0–0	0–4	2nd
2016–17	UEFA Europa League	Group E	Austria Wien	2–3	2–1	2nd
2016–17	UEFA Europa League	R32	(Belgium) Genk	2–2	0–1	2–3
2017–18	UEFA Europa League	2Q	(Azerbaijan) Zira	3–1	0–0	3–1
2017–18	UEFA Europa League	3Q	(Ukraine) Oleksandriya	0–0	0–1	0–1

== Top scorers ==
P	Player	Country	Goals
1	Constantin Budescu	Romania	9
2	Kehinde Fatai	Nigeria	5
3	Denis Alibec	Romania	4
4	Fwayo Tembo	Zambia	3
5	Sadat Bukari	Ghana	3
6	Takayuki Seto	Japan	2
7	Alexandru Dandea	Romania	2
8	Gabriel Enache	Romania	2
9	Filipe Teixeira	Portugal	2
10	Fernando Boldrin	Brazil	2
11	Mirko Ivanovski	(North Macedonia) Macedonia	1
12	Valerică Găman	Romania	1
13	Cristian Săpunaru	Romania	1
14	William De Amorim	Brazil	1
15	Laurențiu Rus	Romania	1
16	Alexandru Stan	Romania	1
17	Alexandru Ioniță	Romania	1
18	George Florescu	Romania	1
19	Aurelian Chițu	Romania	1
20	Daniel Florea	Romania	1
21	Anthony Le Tallec	France	1
