= 2014 Cupa României final =

- Event: 2013–14 Cupa României
Steaua București	Astra Giurgiu
Liga I	Liga I
0	0
- Astra Giurgiu won 4–2 after penalties
- Date: 23 May 2014
- Venue: Arena Națională, Bucharest
- Man of the Match: Silviu Lung Jr.
- Referee: Ovidiu Hațegan
- Attendance: 48,201

The 2014 Cupa României final was the 76th final of Romania's most prestigious knock-out competition. The final was played at the Arena Națională stadium, in Bucharest, between Steaua București and Astra Giurgiu. Astra Giurgiu won the trophy, for the first time in their history, with a 4-2 win in a penalty shoot-out. After 120 minutes, of regular play, the score was tied at a 0-0 draw.

== Route to the final ==
Steaua București		Round	Astra Giurgiu
Opponent	Results		Opponent	Results
Avântul Bârsana	4–0 (H)	Last 32	ACS Berceni	4–1 (H)
ACS Poli Timișoara	2–0 (H)	Last 16	Gaz Metan Mediaș	0–1 (A)
Oțelul Galați	2–0 (H)	Quarter-finals	Viitorul Constanța	0–3 (A)
Dinamo București	5–2 (H) and 1–1 (A)	Semi-finals	Petrolul Ploiești	0–0 (A) and 2–1 (H)

== Match details ==
23 May 2014
21:00 EEST

Steaua București	0–0 (a.e.t.)	Astra Giurgiu
	Report
Penalties
Keșerü (penalty scored); Varela (penalty missed); Pintilii (penalty missed); Szukała (penalty scored)	2–4	(penalty scored) Laban; (penalty scored) Júnior Morais; (penalty missed) Cristescu; (penalty scored) Budescu; (penalty scored) Yazalde

Arena Națională, Bucharest
Attendance: 48.201
Referee: Ovidiu Hațegan

STEAUA	ASTRA

GK	12	(Romania) Ciprian Tătărușanu
DF	17	(North Macedonia) Daniel Georgievski	(yellow card) 36'	(substituted off) 44'
DF	33	(Cape Verde) Fernando Varela
DF	4	(Poland) Łukasz Szukała	(yellow card) 88'
DF	14	(Romania) Iasmin Latovlevici
MF	5	(Romania) Mihai Pintilii (c) (yellow card) 105'
MF	11	(Romania) Andrei Prepeliță	(yellow card) 56'	(substituted off) 71'
MF	77	(Romania) Adrian Popa		(substituted off) 80'
MF	18	(Romania) Lucian Sânmărtean	(red card) 53'
MF	10	(Romania) Cristian Tănase
FW	7	(Romania) Alexandru Chipciu
Substitutes:
GK	1	(Romania) Florin Niță
DF	2	(Romania) Cornel Râpă		(substituted on) 71'
DF	22	(Romania) Paul Pârvulescu
MF	23	(Romania) Nicolae Stanciu
FW	25	(Italy) Federico Piovaccari		(substituted on) 80'
FW	28	(Romania) Claudiu Keșerü		(substituted on) 44'
MF	80	(Romania) Gabriel Iancu
Manager:
(Romania) Laurențiu Reghecampf

GK	1	(Romania) Silviu Lung Jr.
DF	77	(Romania) Alexandru Mățel
DF	5	(Tunisia) Syam Ben Youssef	(yellow card) 64'
DF	25	(Romania) Valerică Găman	(yellow card) 30'
DF	13	(Brazil) Júnior Morais	(yellow card) 103'
MF	6	(Ghana) Seidu Yahaya		(substituted off) 91'
MF	14	(Cyprus) Vincent Laban	(yellow card) 117'
MF	37	(France) Karim Yoda	(substituted off) 106'
MF	10	(Romania) Constantin Budescu (c)
FW	19	(Ghana) Sadat Bukari		(substituted off) 73'
FW	21	(Portugal) Yazalde	(yellow card) 84'
Substitutes:
GK	33	(Romania) Dănuț Coman
MF	8	(Japan) Takayuki Seto
FW	11	(Romania) Denis Alibec	(red card) 98'	(substituted on) 73'
MF	18	(Romania) Marian Cristescu	(yellow card) 92'	(substituted on) 91'
DF	23	(Romania) Paul Papp
MF	28	(Romania) Alexandru Ioniță
MF	91	(Brazil) William de Amorim		(substituted on) 106'
Manager:
(Romania) Daniel Isăilă

MATCH OFFICIALS

- Assistant referees:
  - (Romania) Octavian Șovre
  - (Romania) Miklos Nagy
- Fourth official:
  - (Romania) Sebastian Colțescu
- Additional referees:
  - (Romania) István Kovács
  - (Romania) Adrian Comănescu
- Reserve assistant referee:
  - (Romania) Vasile Marinescu

MAN OF THE MATCH

- (Romania) Silviu Lung Jr.

MATCH RULES

- 90 minutes.
- 30 minutes extra-time (15-minute intervals)
- Penalty shoot-out if scores level after extra time.
- Seven named substitutes
- Maximum of 3 substitutions.

== See also ==
- Supercupa României 2014
