= Manasia =

Manasia may refer to:

- Manasia, Ialomița, a commune in Romania
- Manasia, Buzău, a village near Cernătești, Buzău, Romania

== See also ==
- Manasija
