= Silviu Lung Jr. =

Romanian footballer (born 1989)

Silviu Lung
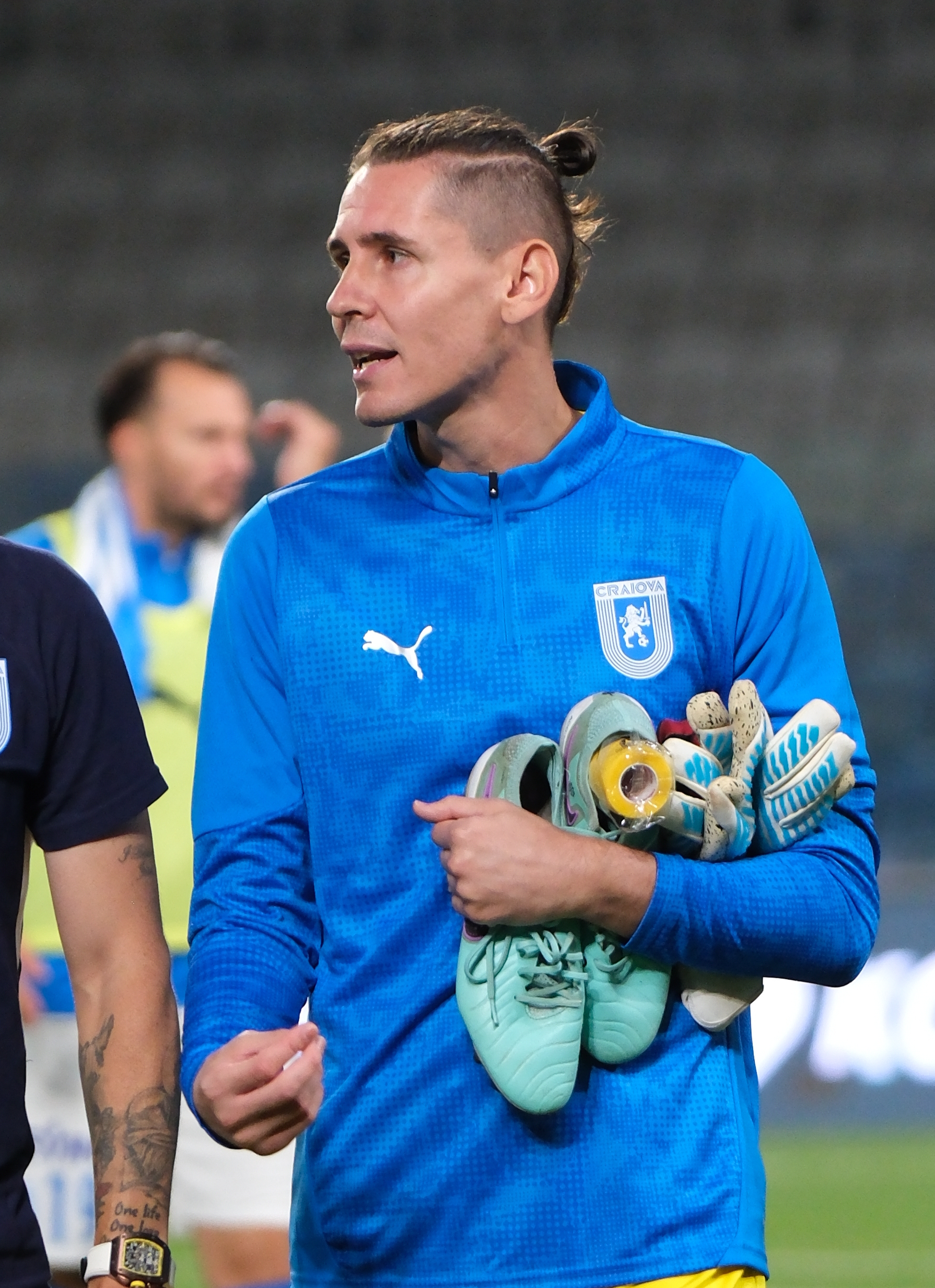
- Lung with Universitatea Craiova in 2025

Personal information
- Date of birth: 4 June 1989 (age 37)
- Place of birth: Craiova, Romania
- Height: 1.89 m (6 ft 2 in)
- Position: Goalkeeper

Youth career
- –2008: FC Universitatea Craiova

Senior career*
Years	Team	Apps	(Gls)
2006–2011	FC Universitatea Craiova	58	(0)
2011–2017	Astra Giurgiu	161	(0)
2017–2022	Kayserispor	125	(0)
2022–2023	Al-Raed	27	(0)
2023–2024	Politehnica Iași	22	(0)
2024–2026	CS Universitatea Craiova	8	(0)

International career^{‡}
2009–2011	Romania U21	19	(0)
2010–2019	Romania	3	(0)
- * Club domestic league appearances and goals as of 31 August 2025 ‡ National team caps and goals as of 15 November 2019

Silviu Lung (born 4 June 1989) is a Romanian professional footballer who plays as a goalkeeper.

== Club career ==
=== FC Universitatea Craiova ===
Lung was born on 4 June 1989 in Craiova, Romania. He began his senior career at local club FC Universitatea Craiova. He made his Divizia B debut during the 2005–06 season when coach Ovidiu Stîngă sent him on to replace Mircea Bornescu in a 5–2 away win against Astra Ploiești—a season that ended with the team earning promotion to the first league. Subsequently, he made his Divizia A debut on 12 April 2008 by playing the entire match under coach Nicolò Napoli in a 1–1 draw against Oțelul Galați. After the team suffered relegation at the end of the 2010–11 season, Lung and teammate Alexandru Ologu joined Astra Giurgiu.

=== Astra Giurgiu ===
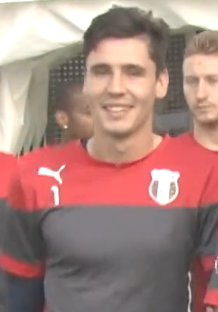
Lung with Astra in 2015

Lung played eight matches in the 2013–14 Europa League qualifying rounds, helping Astra get past Domžale, Omonia Nicosia and AS Trenčín, before they were defeated by Maccabi Haifa in the play-off. The team won the 2014 Cupa României final, in which coach Daniel Isăilă used him the entire game and Lung kept a clean sheet for 120 minutes in the eventual penalty shoot-out victory against Steaua București, a performance which earned him the title of "Man of the match". He then helped them win the 2014 Supercupa României after another victory against Steaua. Afterwards, Lung played four games in the 2014–15 Europa League qualifiers, as Astra eliminated Slovan Liberec and Lyon, reaching the group stage, where he made a further six appearances.

In the 2015–16 season, Lung played 27 league games under coach Marius Șumudică, as Astra won the title. Furthermore, he contributed to his side eliminating Inverness and West Ham in the 2015–16 Europa League qualifiers before they were defeated by AZ Alkmaar in the play-off. Subsequently, he started the 2016 Supercupa României against CFR Cluj, but Șumudică was forced to substitute him for George Gavrilaș at halftime after he suffered an injury in the eventual 1–0 victory. Lung helped the team eliminate West Ham in the 2016–17 Europa League and reach the group stage. He kept a clean sheet in a 0–0 draw against AS Roma in the last group stage match, which helped his side advance to the round of 32. There, Lung played in both legs of the 3–2 aggregate defeat to Genk. The club reached the 2017 Cupa României final, and he played the entire match under Șumudică in the eventual penalty shoot-out loss to Voluntari.

=== Kayserispor ===
Lung (left) in action for Kayserispor during a 2019 friendly match against Red Bull Salzburg

In June 2017, Lung was transferred from Astra to Kayserispor for a €350,000 fee. His debut in the Süper Lig took place on 14 August under coach Șumudică in a 4–1 away loss to Galatasaray. In early 2021, Lung was briefly coached by his compatriot, Dan Petrescu. The team reached the 2022 Turkish Cup final, where he played the entire game under coach Hikmet Karaman in a 3–2 loss to Sivasspor; despite conceding three goals, Lung was named "Man of the match". During his stint with Kayserispor, he had fellow Romanians Cristian Săpunaru and Denis Alibec as teammates. Lung made 125 appearances in the Turkish league in his five-season spell.

=== Al-Raed ===
In the summer of 2022, Lung and his compatriot Alexandru Mitriță joined Al-Raed, brought there by coach Șumudică. Lung made his Saudi Pro League debut on 27 August in a 2–1 away loss to Abha.

=== Politehnica Iași ===
In August 2023, Lung returned to Romania and signed with Politehnica Iași. During the final matchday of the 2023–24 season, his clean sheet in a 2–0 victory against Petrolul Ploiești earned the points that mathematically saved the team from relegation.

=== CS Universitatea Craiova ===
On 30 May 2024, Lung joined CS Universitatea Craiova. He played five league matches under coaches Mirel Rădoi and Filipe Coelho during the 2025–26 season, as the team won The Double. Lung accumulated a total of 248 matches in Liga I.

== International career ==
From 2009 to 2011, Lung made 19 appearances for Romania's under-21 side. Notably, he helped them finish first in the group for the 2011 European Under-21 Championship qualifiers before reaching a play-off, where they were defeated 2–1 on aggregate by England U21, who advanced to the final tournament.

Lung played three matches for Romania, making his debut on 5 June 2010, when coach Răzvan Lucescu sent him in the 83rd minute to replace Bogdan Lobonț in a 3–0 friendly win over Honduras. His second game was a 1–1 draw against Albania in the Euro 2012 qualifiers. Lung's last appearance for the national team took place on 4 June 2014 in a 2–1 friendly loss to Algeria. He was selected by coach Anghel Iordănescu to be part of Romania's squad for the Euro 2016 final tournament, but did not play in any games, as he was third-choice goalkeeper behind Ciprian Tătărușanu and Costel Pantilimon. In 2020, he announced his international retirement.

== Personal life ==
He is the son of Silviu Lung and the younger brother of Tiberiu Lung, both of whom played as goalkeepers and represented Romania at international level.

== Career statistics ==
=== Club ===
Appearances and goals by club, season and competition
Club	Season	League			National cup (Note: Includes Cupa României, Turkish Cup, King's Cup)		Continental		Other		Total	
Club	Season	Division	Apps	Goals	Apps	Goals	Apps	Goals	Apps	Goals	Apps	Goals
FC Universitatea Craiova	2005–06	Divizia B	1	0	–		–		–		1	0
FC Universitatea Craiova	2006–07	Liga I	0	0	0	0	–		–		0	0
FC Universitatea Craiova	2007–08	Liga I	2	0	0	0	–		–		2	0
FC Universitatea Craiova	2008–09	Liga I	3	0	1	0	–		–		4	0
FC Universitatea Craiova	2009–10	Liga I	29	0	1	0	–		–		30	0
FC Universitatea Craiova	2010–11	Liga I	23	0	2	0	–		–		25	0
FC Universitatea Craiova	Total		58	0	4	0	–		–		62	0
Astra Giurgiu	2011–12	Liga I	29	0	1	0	–		–		30	0
Astra Giurgiu	2012–13	Liga I	29	0	4	0	–		–		33	0
Astra Giurgiu	2013–14	Liga I	18	0	6	0	8 (Note: Appearances in UEFA Europa League)	0	–		32	0
Astra Giurgiu	2014–15	Liga I	31	0	0	0	10	0	3 (Note: One appearance in Supercupa României, two appearances in Cupa Ligii)	0	44	0
Astra Giurgiu	2015–16	Liga I	27	0	1	0	6	0	0	0	34	0
Astra Giurgiu	2016–17	Liga I	27	0	2	0	12 (Note: Two appearances in UEFA Champions League, ten appearances in UEFA Europa League)	0	1 (Note: Appearance in Supercupa României)	0	42	0
Astra Giurgiu	Total		161	0	14	0	36	0	4	0	215	0
Kayserispor	2017–18	Süper Lig	29	0	1	0	–		–		30	0
Kayserispor	2018–19	Süper Lig	29	0	2	0	–		–		31	0
Kayserispor	2019–20	Süper Lig	29	0	1	0	–		–		30	0
Kayserispor	2020–21	Süper Lig	8	0	0	0	–		–		8	0
Kayserispor	2021–22	Süper Lig	30	0	3	0	–		–		33	0
Kayserispor	Total		125	0	7	0	–		–		132	0
Al-Raed	2022–23	Saudi Pro League	27	0	1	0	–		–		28	0
Politehnica Iași	2023–24	Liga I	22	0	1	0	–		–		23	0
CS Universitatea Craiova	2024–25	Liga I	3	0	4	0	0	0	–		7	0
CS Universitatea Craiova	2025–26	Liga I	5	0	0	0	0	0	–		5	0
CS Universitatea Craiova	Total		8	0	4	0	0	0	–		12	0
Career total			401	0	31	0	36	0	4	0	472	0

=== International ===
Appearances and goals by national team and year
National team	Year	Apps	Goals
Romania	2010	1	0
Romania	2011	1	0
Romania	2014	1	0
Total		3	0

== Honours ==
FC Universitatea Craiova

- Divizia B: 2005–06

Astra Giurgiu

- Liga I: 2015–16
- Cupa României: 2013–14; runner-up: 2016–17
- Supercupa României: 2014, 2016

Kayserispor

- Turkish Cup runner-up: 2021–22

CS Universitatea Craiova

- Liga I: 2025–26
- Cupa României: 2025–26
