= Mirko Ivanovski =

Macedonian footballer

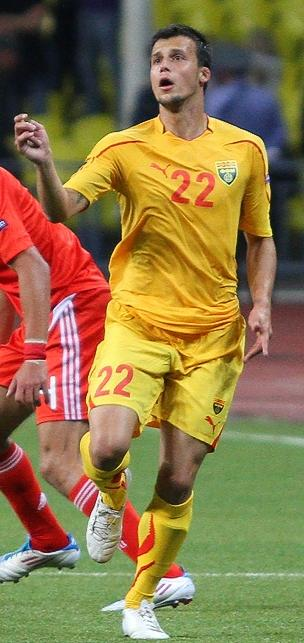
- Ivanovski with Macedonia in 2011

Personal information
- Full name: Mirko Ivanovski
- Date of birth: 31 October 1989 (age 37)
- Place of birth: Bitola, SR Macedonia, SFR Yugoslavia
- Height: 1.82 m (6 ft 0 in)
- Position: Striker

Team information
- Current team: Pelister
- Number: 44

Youth career
- –2006: Pelister

Senior career*
| Years | Team | Apps | (Gls) |
| 2006–2008 | Pelister | 8 | (0) |
| 2008–2010 | Makedonija | 34 | (19) |
| 2010 | → Slavia Prague (loan) | 10 | (3) |
| 2010–2012 | Arka Gdynia | 44 | (6) |
| 2012–2014 | Astra Giurgiu | 45 | (11) |
| 2014–2015 | CFR Cluj | 14 | (2) |
| 2015–2016 | Videoton | 16 | (2) |
| 2016 | Boluspor | 10 | (0) |
| 2016–2018 | Slaven Belupo | 63 | (25) |
| 2018–2019 | Hajduk Split | 20 | (5) |
| 2019–2021 | Diósgyőr | 50 | (9) |
| 2021–2022 | Dinamo București | 26 | (4) |
| 2022–2023 | Petrolul Ploiești | 14 | (0) |
| 2023 | Concordia Chiajna | 9 | (1) |
| 2023–2024 | Tunari | 18 | (7) |
| 2024–2026 | Pelister | 41 | (12) |

International career
| 2005–2006 | Macedonia U17 | 3 | (0) |
| 2007–2008 | Macedonia U19 | 3 | (1) |
| 2009–2010 | Macedonia U21 | 7 | (0) |
| 2010–2015 | Macedonia | 27 | (1) |
- * Club domestic league appearances and goals as of 25 May 2026

Mirko Ivanovski (Macedonian: Мирко Ивановски; born 31 October 1989) is a Macedonian professional footballer who last played as a striker for club Pelister, which he captains.

== Club career ==
Ivanovski began his career with the youth side of Pelister Bitola who was in summer 2006 promoted to the first team, but he left his club in July 2008 to sign for Makedonija Skopje. On 5 February 2010 Slavia Prague has signed the Macedonian U21 national team member, the 20-year-old is considered one of the greatest talents in country. Ivanovski signed a 2-year deal with Polish club Arka Gdynia on 2 August 2010.

=== Astra Giurgiu ===
In the summer of 2012, Ivanovski moved to the Romanian club Astra Giurgiu.

=== Videoton ===
On 16 January 2015, Ivanovski was signed by Hungarian League club Videoton.

=== Slaven Belupo ===
On 4 July 2016, Ivanovski joined the Croatian team Slaven Belupo.

He showed an impressive display, notably in the 2017-18 season, where he was the league's 3rd top scorer along with Mario Gavranović, netting 15 goals in 30 matches.

=== Hajduk Split ===
After his contract at Slaven expired, he decided not to extend it and eventually joined Hajduk Split on a free transfer. After scoring 5 goals in 25 games across all competitions, Ivanovski was released by Hajduk on 23 June 2016.

=== Dinamo București ===
In September 2021, he signed a contract with Liga I side Dinamo București.

=== Petrolul Ploiești ===
On 20 June 2022, following the relegation of Dinamo București to the Liga II, Ivanovski continued in Romania and its first division by signing a two-year deal with Petrolul Ploiești.

== International career ==
He made his senior debut for Macedonia in a December 2010 friendly match away against China and has earned a total of 27 caps, scoring 1 goal. His final international was an October 2015 European Championship qualification match against Ukraine.

=== International stats ===
Appearances and goals by national team and year
| National team | Year | Apps | Goals |
|---|---|---|---|
Macedonia (Note: North Macedonia was known as Macedonia until 2019)
| Macedonia | 2010 | 1 | 0 |
| Macedonia | 2011 | 4 | 1 |
| Macedonia | 2012 | 6 | 0 |
| Macedonia | 2013 | 9 | 0 |
| Macedonia | 2014 | 3 | 0 |
| Macedonia | 2015 | 4 | 0 |
| Total | | 27 | 1 |

Macedonia score listed first, score column indicates score after each Ivanovski goal.

International goals by date, venue, cap, opponent, score, result and competition
| No. | Date | Venue | Cap | Opponent | Score | Result | Competition |
|---|---|---|---|---|---|---|---|
| 1 | 6 September 2011 | Toshe Proeski Arena, Skopje, Macedonia | 3 | Andorra | 1–0 | 1–0 | UEFA Euro 2012 qualifying |

== Honours ==
Makedonija

- 1. MFL: 2008–09
- Macedonian Cup runner-up: 2008–09

Astra Giurgiu

- Cupa României: 2013–14
- Supercupa României: 2014

Videoton

- Nemzeti Bajnokság I: 2014–15
- Magyar Kupa runner-up: 2014–15
- Szuperkupa runner-up: 2015
