= Buturugeni =

- Commune
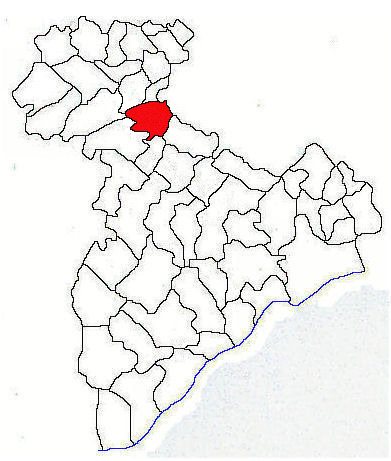
- Location in Giurgiu County

- Location in Romania
- Coordinates: 44°22′N 25°50′E
- Country: Romania
- County: Giurgiu

Government
  - Mayor (2020–2024): Dumitru Preda (PSD)
- Area: 43.58 km^{2} (16.83 sq mi)
- Elevation: 96 m (315 ft)
- Population (2021-12-01): 4,283
  - Density: 98/km^{2} (250/sq mi)
- Time zone: EET/EEST (UTC+2/+3)
- Postal code: 87035
- Area code: +(40) x46
- Vehicle reg.: GR
- Website: www.comunabuturugeni.ro

Buturugeni is a commune located in Giurgiu County, Muntenia, Romania. It is composed of four villages: Buturugeni, Pădureni, Podu Ilfovățului, and Poșta.

Historical population
| Year | Pop. | ±% |
|---|---|---|
| 2002 | 4,144 | — |
| 2011 | 4,079 | −1.6% |
| 2021 | 4,283 | +5.0% |
Source: Census data

== Natives ==
- Ioan Niculae (born 1954), businessman
