= Manasia, Ialomița =

Manasia
- Commune
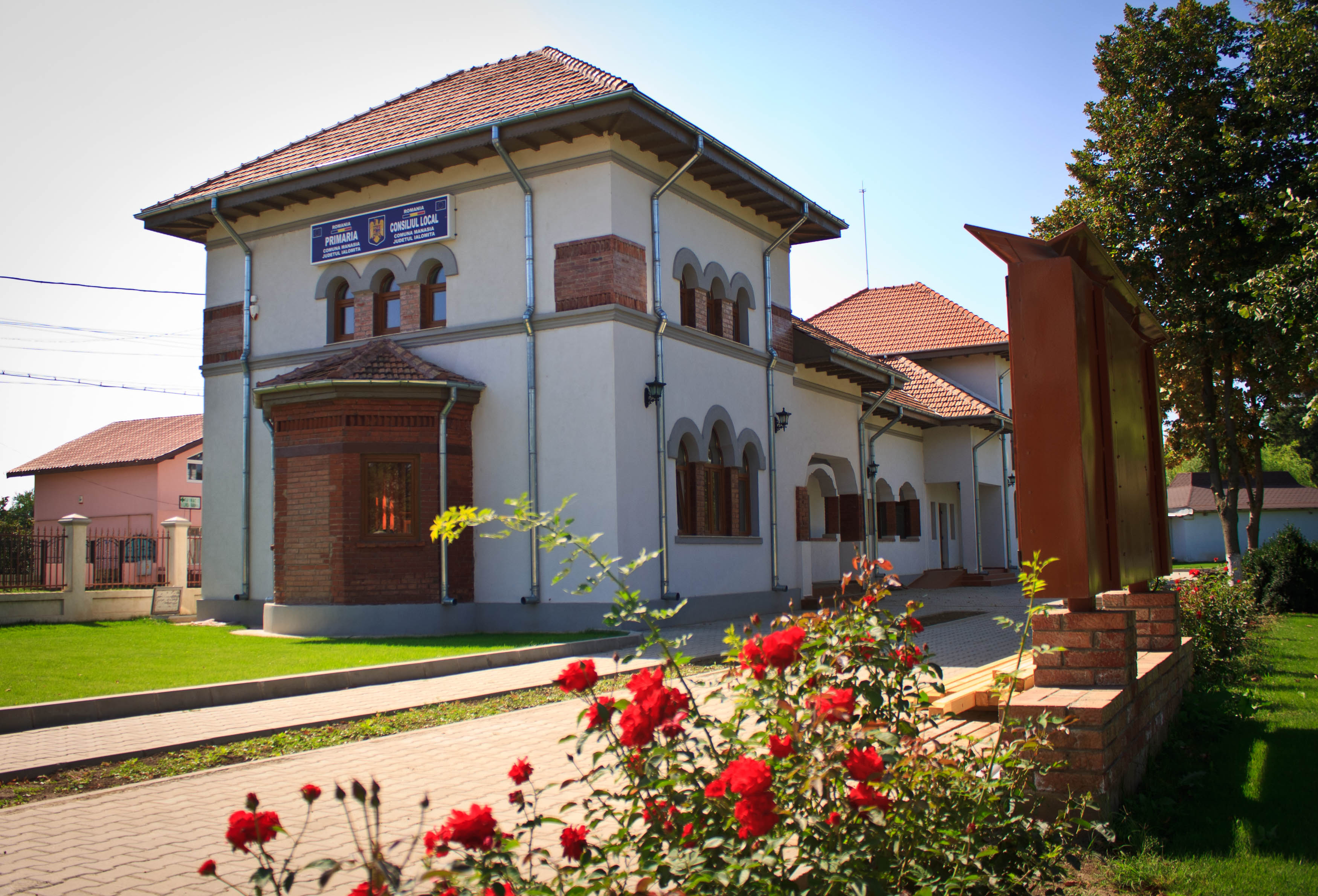
- Manasia town hall

- Location in Ialomița County

- Location in Romania
- Coordinates: 44°42′N 26°40′E
- Country: Romania
- County: Ialomița

Government
  - Mayor (2020–2024): Alexandru Veihemer (PSD)
- Area: 34.74 km^{2} (13.41 sq mi)
- Population (2021-12-01): 4,197
  - Density: 120.8/km^{2} (312.9/sq mi)
- Time zone: UTC+02:00 (EET)
  - Summer (DST): UTC+03:00 (EEST)
- Postal code: 927160
- Area code: +(40) 243
- Vehicle reg.: IL
- Website: www.manasia.ro

Manasia is a commune located in Ialomița County, Muntenia, Romania. It is composed of a single village, Manasia.

The commune is located in the western part of the country, on the left bank of the Ialomița River. It is crossed by the DN2A road that connects the city of Urziceni (3.3 km (2.1 mi) to the west), to the county seat, Slobozia (60 km (37 mi) to the east).

Historical population
Year	Pop.	±%
1899	1,081	—
1925	2,152	+99.1%
2002	4,673	+117.1%
2011	4,405	−5.7%
2021	4,197	−4.7%
Source: Census data

== Natives ==
- Constantin Budescu (born 1989), midfielder for Astra Giurgiu and Steaua București.
