= Denis Alibec =

Romanian footballer (born 1991)

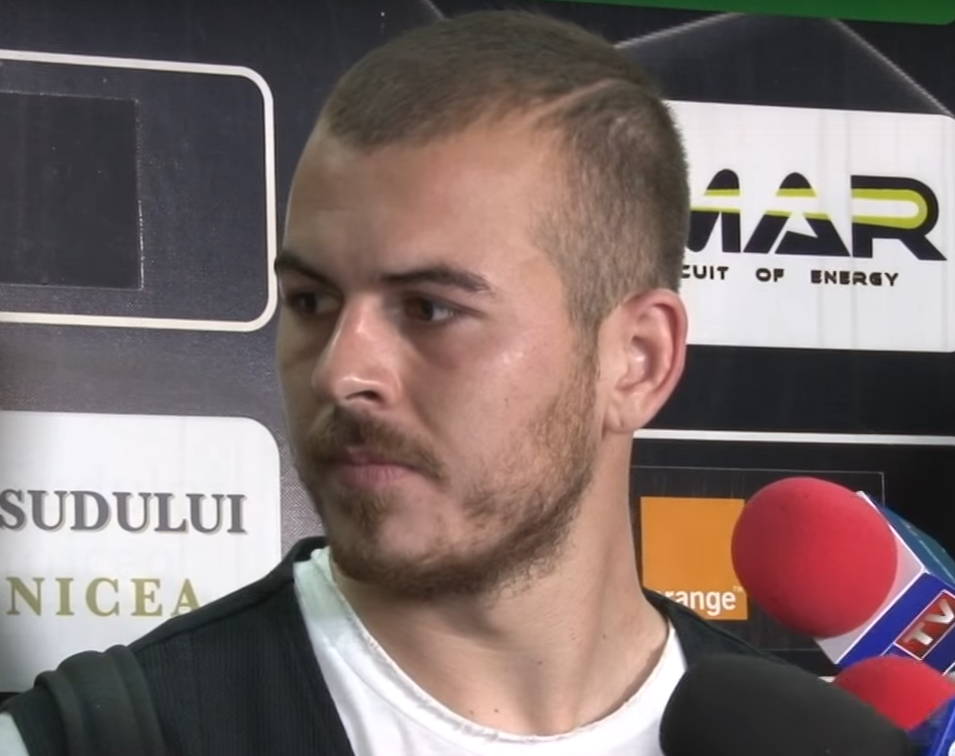
- Alibec in 2016

Personal information
- Date of birth: 5 January 1991 (age 35)
- Place of birth: Mangalia, Romania
- Height: 1.87 m (6 ft 2 in)
- Position: Forward

Team information
- Current team: Farul Constanța
- Number: 7

Youth career
- 2001–2006: Callatis Mangalia
- 2006: Steaua București
- 2006–2008: Farul Constanța
- 2009–2010: Inter Milan

Senior career*
Years	Team	Apps	(Gls)
2008–2009	Farul Constanța	18	(2)
2010–2014	Inter Milan	2	(0)
2011–2012	→ Mechelen (loan)	11	(0)
2012–2013	→ Viitorul Constanța (loan)	23	(5)
2013–2014	→ Bologna (loan)	1	(0)
2014–2016	Astra Giurgiu	64	(32)
2017–2018	FCSB	34	(9)
2018–2020	Astra Giurgiu	56	(20)
2020–2022	Kayserispor	15	(2)
2021–2022	→ CFR Cluj (loan)	12	(2)
2022	→ Atromitos (loan)	13	(2)
2022–2023	Farul Constanța	31	(14)
2023–2024	Muaither	21	(5)
2024–2025	Farul Constanța	30	(9)
2025–2026	FCSB	7	(0)
2026–	Farul Constanța	23	(9)

International career^{‡}
2007–2008	Romania U17	6	(2)
2008–2010	Romania U19	9	(5)
2011–2012	Romania U21	5	(3)
2015–2025	Romania	45	(6)
- * Club domestic league appearances and goals as of 7 November 2026 ‡ National team caps and goals as of 10 June 2025

Denis Alibec (born 5 January 1991) is a Romanian professional footballer who plays as a forward for Liga I club Farul Constanța.

Alibec began his senior career at Farul Constanța, and at age 18 was signed by Italian club Inter Milan. He only made two Serie A appearances and was loaned out several times, before being brought back to Romania by Astra Giurgiu. He became a regular starter and goalscorer with the latter, and also aided it in winning its first national title in the 2015–16 season. This inspired a move to his former youth team FCSB in 2017, but Alibec transferred back to Astra after only one and a half years. Since 2020, in addition to Romania he has had brief stints in Turkey, Greece, and Qatar.

Internationally, Alibec featured for Romania at under-17, under-19, and under-21 levels, prior to earning his full debut in a 3–0 win over the Faroe Islands in October 2015. He represented the country in two UEFA European Championships, in 2016 and 2024.

== Club career ==
=== Early career / Farul Constanța ===
At age ten, after only playing football on the beaches of his native Mangalia, Alibec chose to focus entirely on the sport and joined the youth setup of Callatis Mangalia. He had a brief spell as a junior at Steaua București in 2006, before making his senior debut for Farul Constanța in a 1–1 Liga I draw with Oțelul Galați on 27 September 2008. During the 2008–09 season, he managed to score twice from 18 league matches.

=== Inter Milan ===
In July 2009, it was announced that Alibec signed a four-year contract with Italian club Inter Milan. On 19 May 2010, he scored one goal in each half to give Inter a victory over Bayern Munich in the UEFA Under-18 Challenge match, which acted as an inspiration for the UEFA Youth League.

Alibec registered his Serie A debut on 21 November 2010, coming on as a 68th-minute substitute for Jonathan Biabiany in a 1–2 defeat to Chievo Verona. During that period, he was in rich form in the Campionato Primavera Girone B after scoring eight goals in nine games.

==== Various loans ====
On 24 August 2011, Alibec joined Belgian Pro League side Mechelen on a one-year deal. The next two years, he moved to Viitorul Constanța and Bologna in the same predicament, respectively.

=== Astra Giurgiu ===
In January 2014, Romanian club Astra Giurgiu transferred Alibec for an undisclosed fee, with the player penning down a four-and-a-half-year contract. His first goal came in a 2–0 win over Ceahlăul Piatra Neamț, on 30 March 2014. On 6 December that year, he netted in a 6–1 thrashing of Dinamo București.

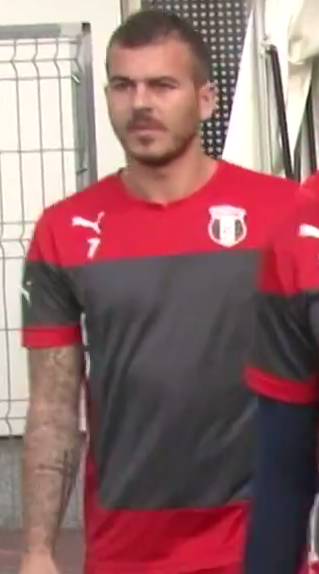
Alibec training for Astra Giurgiu in 2015.

On 30 April 2015, Alibec scored a 86th-minute volley in a 2–1 win against Petrolul Ploiești, which represented Astra's first Liga I away victory in the Former Ploiești derby. He established himself as one of the league's best players during the 2015–16 campaign, amassing 33 matches and 20 goals in all competitions as manager Marius Șumudică led Astra to its maiden championship title.

On 18 August 2016, Alibec netted the equaliser in a 1–1 Europa League play-off round draw with West Ham United. He went on to make five appearances and score two goals in the group stage of the competition, his notable display throughout 2016 earning him the Gazeta Sporturilor Romanian Footballer of the Year award.

=== FCSB ===
On 5 January 2017, Alibec moved to fellow Liga I team FC Steaua București on a five-year deal. The rumoured transfer fee was in the region of €2 million and his buyout clause was set at €20 million. He scored his first competitive goal from the penalty spot in a 1–1 league draw with CFR Cluj on 5 February, in which he was also sent off.

On 2 August 2017, Alibec netted his first European goal for the Roș-albaștrii in a 4–1 Champions League third qualifying round away win over Viktoria Plzeň. After going twelve matches without scoring in the 2017–18 Liga I, Alibec finally found the net in a 2–1 away victory against Gaz Metan Mediaș on 3 February 2018, although his poor performances continued.

=== Return to Astra Giurgiu ===
In July 2018, after falling out of favor at the now-renamed FCSB, Alibec returned to Astra Giurgiu in a transfer rumoured to be worth €1.4 million. He managed to regain his form during his spell back at the Marin Anastasovici Stadium, as he scored 22 times from 61 games in all competitions.

=== Kayserispor ===
On 2 October 2020, Alibec officially transferred to Turkish team Kayserispor, where he joined compatriots and former Astra teammates Silviu Lung Jr. and Cristian Săpunaru. The day before, Saudi Arabian club Al-Qadsiah had also announced his signing, but the move fell through. Alibec recorded his first goals in the Süper Lig on 19 January 2021, in a 2–0 victory over defending champions İstanbul Başakşehir. He suffered an injury after the second goal, and as a result only appeared five more times during the remainder of the season without netting.

==== Loans to CFR Cluj and Atromitos ====
On 17 July 2021, Alibec was sent out on a one-year loan to CFR Cluj, with the deal reuniting him with former Astra manager Marius Șumudică. The latter was soon replaced by Dan Petrescu, and Alibec began to feature less for the Romanian defending champions. He moved to Super League Greece club Atromitos in the winter transfer window, also on loan until the end of the campaign.

=== Return to Farul Constanța ===
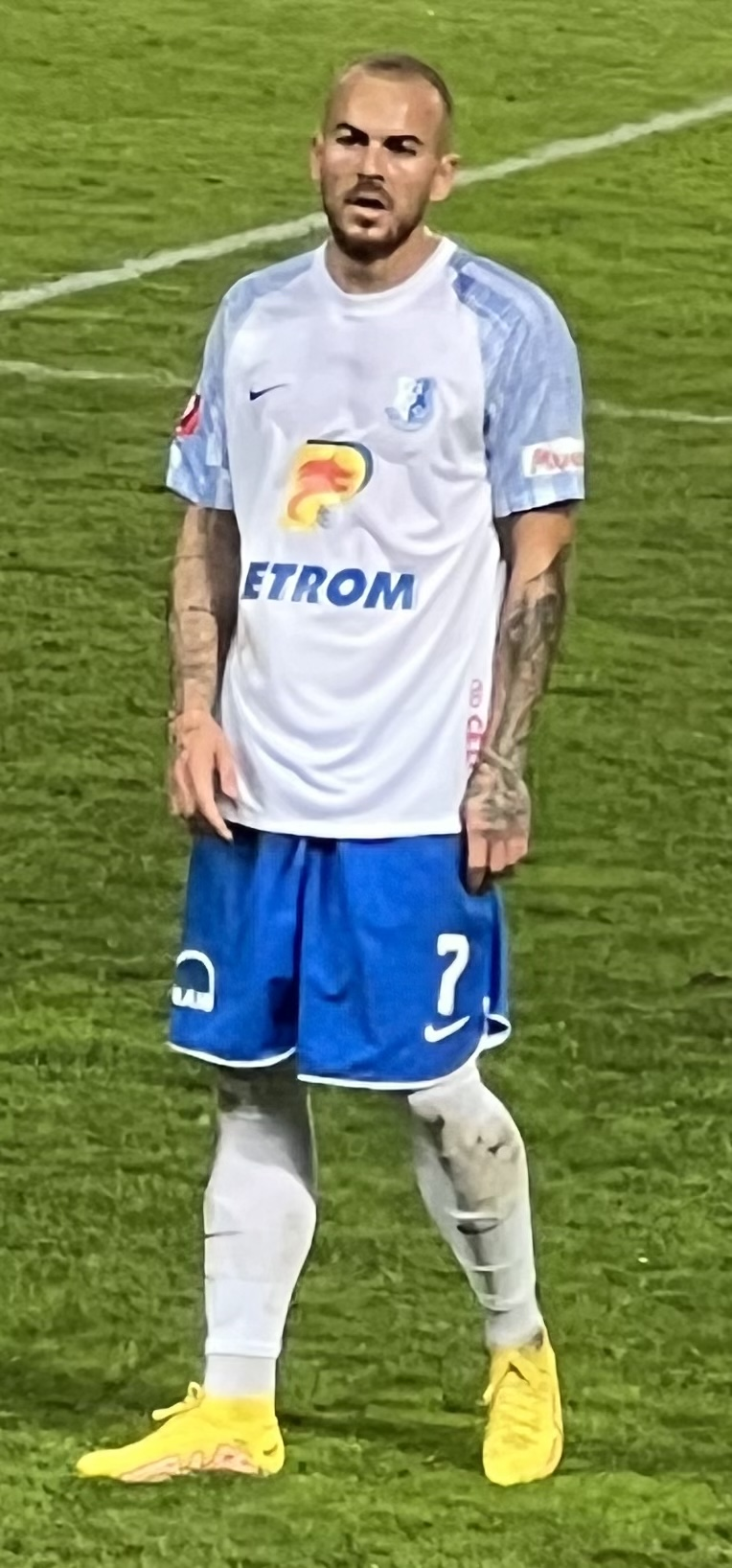
Alibec with Farul in a match against Petrolul Ploiești in which he scored a double, on 16 September 2022.

On 14 July 2022, Alibec returned to Farul Constanța on a free transfer. He signed a one-year deal with the option of another season. On 16 September, Alibec scored a double in a 3–1 away victory over newly-promoted Petrolul Ploiești. On 4 December, he netted a hat-trick in a 8–0 Liga I home thrashing of Botoșani.

Following his good performances, on 8 March 2023 the club announced that Alibec agreed to a two-year contract extension. He scored his second hat-trick of the season on 6 May, in a 7–2 home win over Rapid București, taking his tally to 14 goals in 30 league matches.

One week later against Universitatea Craiova, Alibec missed a penalty kick, provided an assist and received a straight red card before half-time in an eventual 1–1 draw; he was thus suspended for the last two fixtures against title contenders and his former clubs FCSB and CFR Cluj, respectively. On 21 May 2023, after Farul won 3–2 over FCSB, Alibec became the first player to win the national title with three different teams from outside the capital.

On 3 August 2023, Alibec netted a double in a 3–2 away win over Urartu in the second qualifying round of the Europa Conference League.

=== Late career ===
On 15 August 2023, Alibec joined Qatar Stars League club Muaither.

On 21 December that year, the Gazeta Sporturilor newspaper announced that Alibec came third in voting for the 2023 Romanian Footballer of the Year award, representing only his second appearance in top five since his 2016 win.

== International career ==
Alibec played youth football for Romania at under-17, under-19, and under-21 levels. After being called up on several occasions in the past, he gained his first cap for the full side in the last UEFA Euro 2016 qualifying match against the Faroe Islands, on 11 October 2015. He replaced Bogdan Stancu in the 90th minute of the 3–0 win.

In June 2016, Alibec was selected by Anghel Iordănescu in his squad for the final tournament in France, and entered as a substitute in the opening 1–2 defeat to the hosts. He then started in the 0–1 loss to Albania on 19 June, which resulted in a group-stage exit. Alibec appeared sparringly for the national team in the following years, and only scored his first official goal in a 3–2 Nations League away win over Austria, on 7 September 2020.

In the Euro 2024 qualifiers, Alibec totalled nine games and scored three goals, including one in the final 1–0 victory over Switzerland. Romania finished its group unbeaten and qualified from the first place. On 7 June 2024, Alibec was named in the squad for the Euro 2024. He only made two substitute appearances, as Romania topped its group but was eliminated by the Netherlands in the round of 16.

== Personal life ==
Alibec's father and uncle, Gevrim and Gelil, respectively, are of Tatar ethnicity and played football together for roughly ten years at FC Neptun in the third division.

== Career statistics ==
=== Club ===
As of match played 20 November 2026

Appearances and goals by club, season and competition
Club	Season	League			National cup (Note: Includes Belgian Cup, Coppa Italia, Cupa României, Turkish Cup, Emir of Qatar Cup)		League cup (Note: Includes Cupa Ligii, Qatari Stars Cup)		Continental		Other		Total	
Club	Season	Division	Apps	Goals	Apps	Goals	Apps	Goals	Apps	Goals	Apps	Goals	Apps	Goals
Farul Constanța	2008–09	Liga I	18	2	0	0	—		—		—		18	2
Inter Milan	2010–11	Serie A	2	0	0	0	—		—		0	0	2	0
Mechelen (loan)	2011–12	Belgian Pro League	11	0	1	0	—		—		—		12	0
Viitorul Constanța (loan)	2012–13	Liga I	23	5	0	0	—		—		—		23	5
Bologna (loan)	2013–14	Serie A	1	0	2	0	—		—		—		3	0
Astra Giurgiu	2013–14	Liga I	9	5	2	0	—		—		—		11	5
Astra Giurgiu	2014–15	Liga I	16	8	0	0	2	2	0	0	0	0	18	10
Astra Giurgiu	2015–16	Liga I	26	16	2	1	2	2	3 (Note: Appearances in UEFA Europa League)	1	—		33	20
Astra Giurgiu	2016–17	Liga I	13	3	1	0	1	1	7	3	0	0	22	7
Astra Giurgiu	Total		64	32	5	1	5	5	10	4	0	0	84	42
FCSB	2016–17	Liga I	14	8	—		1	1	—		—		15	9
FCSB	2017–18	Liga I	20	1	0	0	—		7 (Note: Four appearances and one goal in UEFA Champions League, three appearances and one goal in UEFA Europa League)	2	—		27	3
FCSB	Total		34	9	0	0	1	1	7	2	—		42	12
Astra Giurgiu	2018–19	Liga I	26	5	4	2	—		—		—		30	7
Astra Giurgiu	2019–20	Liga I	25	14	1	0	—		—		—		26	14
Astra Giurgiu	2020–21	Liga I	5	1	0	0	—		—		—		5	1
Astra Giurgiu	Total		56	20	5	2	—		—		—		61	22
Kayserispor	2020–21	Süper Lig	15	2	2	1	—		—		—		17	3
CFR Cluj (loan)	2021–22	Liga I	12	2	0	0	—		9 (Note: Two appearances in UEFA Champions League, two appearances in UEFA Europa League, five appearances in UEFA Europa Conference League)	0	—		21	2
Atromitos (loan)	2021–22	Super League Greece	13	2	—		—		—		—		13	2
Farul Constanța	2022–23	Liga I	31	14	0	0	—		—		—		31	14
Farul Constanța	2023–24	Liga I	0	0	—		—		5 (Note: Two appearances in UEFA Champions League, three appearances and three goals in UEFA Europa Conference League)	3	1 (Note: Appearances in Supercupa României)	0	6	3
Farul Constanța	Total		31	14	0	0	—		5	3	1	0	37	17
Muaither	2023–24	Qatar Stars League	21	5	1	1	1	2	—		0	0	23	8
Farul Constanța	2024–25	Liga I	30	9	4	1	—		—		—		34	10
FCSB	2025–26	Liga I	7	0	1	1	—		5 (Note: One appearance in UEFA Champions League, four appearances in UEFA Europa League)	0	1	0	14	1
Farul Constanța	2025–26	Liga I	13	6	0	0	—		—		2 (Note: Appearances in Liga I promotion/relegation play-offs)	1	15	7
Farul Constanța	2026–27	Liga I	10	3	1	0	—		—		—		11	3
Farul Constanța	Total		23	9	1	0	—		—		2	1	26	10
Career total			361	111	22	7	7	8	36	9	4	1	430	136

=== International ===
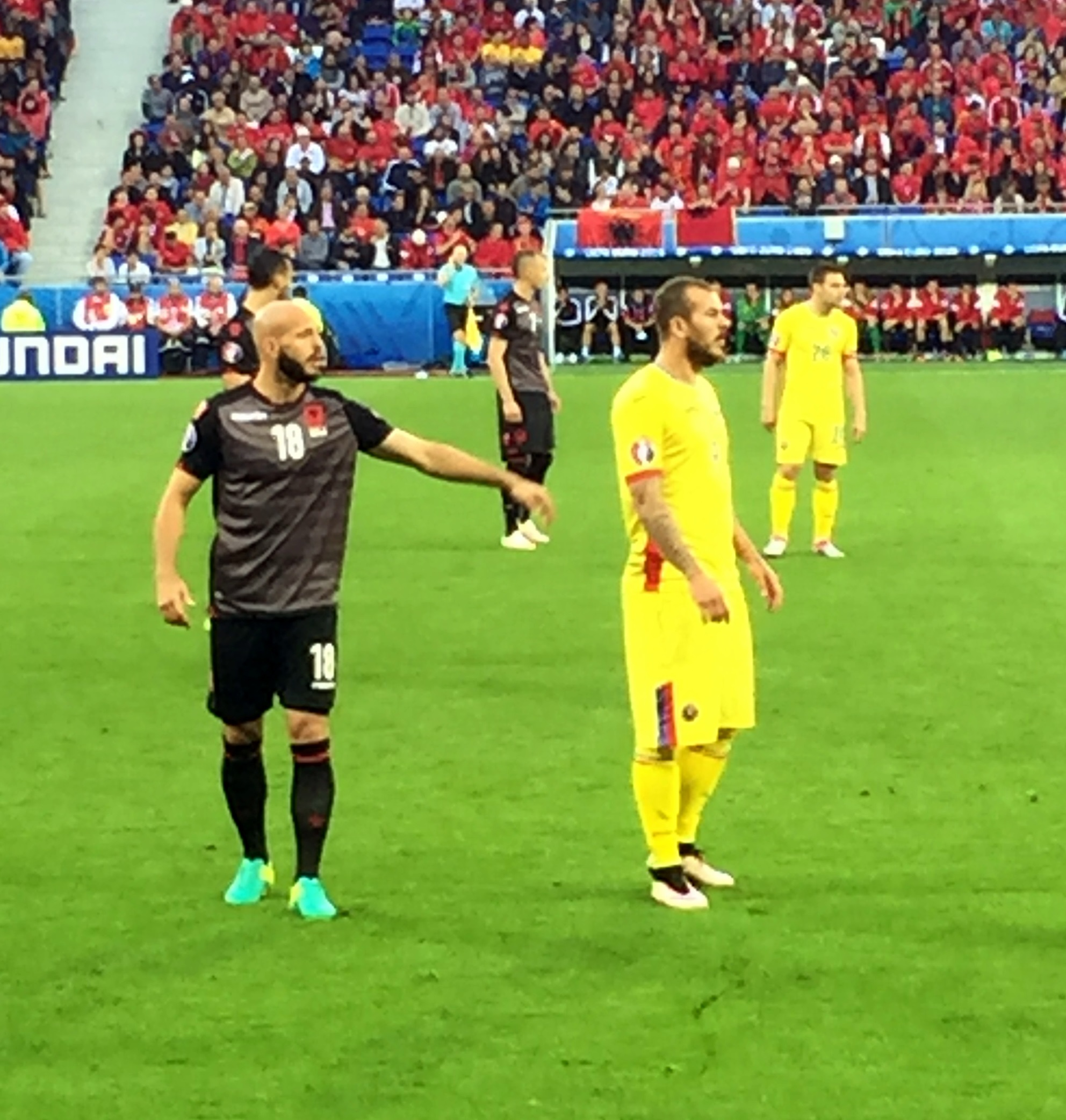
Alibec (in yellow, in the foreground) playing against Albania at the UEFA Euro 2016.

As of match played 10 June 2025

Appearances and goals by national team and year
National team	Year	Apps	Goals
Romania
Romania	2015	1	0
Romania	2016	5	1
Romania	2017	3	0
Romania	2018	0	0
Romania	2019	1	0
Romania	2020	7	1
Romania	2021	5	0
Romania	2022	5	0
Romania	2023	9	3
Romania	2024	5	0
Romania	2025	4	1
Total		45	6

Scores and results list Romania's goal tally first, score column indicates score after each Alibec goal.

List of international goals scored by Denis Alibec
No.	Date	Venue	Cap	Opponent	Score	Result	Competition
1	29 May 2016	Olimpico Grande Torino, Turin, Italy	3	Ukraine	2–4	3–4	Friendly
2	7 September 2020	Wörthersee Stadion, Klagenfurt, Austria	12	Austria	1–0	3–2	2020–21 UEFA Nations League B
3	25 March 2023	Estadi Nacional, Andorra la Vella, Andorra	28	Andorra	2–0	2–0	UEFA Euro 2024 qualification
4	9 September 2023	Arena Națională, Bucharest, Romania	32	Israel	1–0	1–1	UEFA Euro 2024 qualification
5	21 November 2023	Arena Națională, Bucharest, Romania	36	Switzerland	1–0	1–0	UEFA Euro 2024 qualification
6	24 March 2025	San Marino Stadium, Serravalle, San Marino	43	San Marino	5–1	5–1	2026 FIFA World Cup qualification

== Honours ==
Inter Milan

- Coppa Italia: 2010–11
- Supercoppa Italiana: 2010
- FIFA Club World Cup: 2010

Astra Giurgiu

- Liga I: 2015–16
- Cupa României: 2013–14; runner-up: 2018–19
- Supercupa României: 2014, 2016

CFR Cluj

- Liga I: 2021–22

Farul Constanța

- Liga I: 2022–23
- Supercupa României runner-up: 2023

FCSB

- Supercupa României: 2025

Individual

- Gazeta Sporturilor Romanian Footballer of the Year: 2016; third place: 2023
- Liga I Player of the Season: 2022–23
- Liga I Team of the Season: 2016–17, 2019–20, 2022–23
- DigiSport Liga I Player of the Month: December 2015, April 2016, May 2017
