= William de Amorim =

Brazilian-Romanian footballer (born 1991)

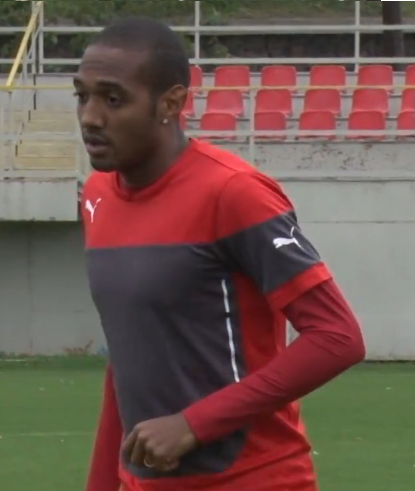
- De Amorim training for Astra Giurgiu in 2015

Personal information
- Full name: William Douglas de Amorim
- Date of birth: 15 December 1991 (age 34)
- Place of birth: Ipatinga, Brazil
- Height: 1.80 m (5 ft 11 in)
- Position: Winger

Youth career
- 2005: Atlético Sorocaba
- 2006–2008: Corinthians
- 2009: Canaã
- 2009: Grêmio
- 2010: Arapongas

Senior career*
Years	Team	Apps	(Gls)
2010–2011	Astra Ploiești II	38	(6)
2011–2016	Astra Giurgiu	129	(16)
2016–2020	FCSB	39	(3)
2018	→ Kayserispor (loan)	12	(1)
2019–2020	→ Xanthi (loan)	37	(2)
2020–2021	Altay	2	(0)
2021	Esportivo	0	(0)
2021–2022	Academica Clinceni	29	(0)
2023	São Luiz	0	(0)
2023	União Luziense	0	(0)
Total		286	(28)
- * Club domestic league appearances and goals

William Douglas de Amorim (born 15 December 1991) is a former Brazilian professional footballer who played as a winger.

== Career ==
=== Astra Giurgiu ===
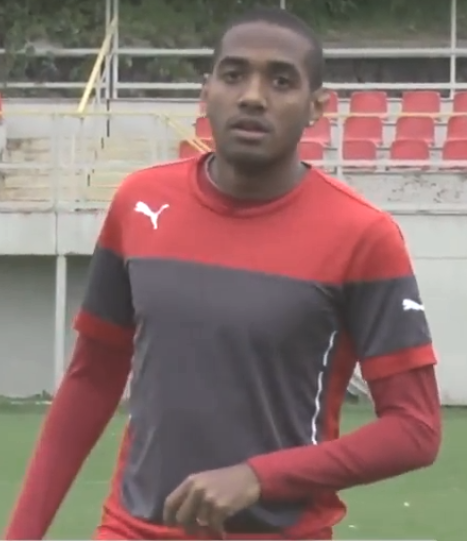
De Amorim training with Astra

De Amorim was born on 15 December 1991 in Ipatinga, Brazil and played junior-level football for several clubs from his country, including Grêmio and Arapongas. He participated with Arapongas in a tournament in Austria, where his talent was noticed by Mihai Stoichiță, who convinced Astra Giurgiu to transfer de Amorim and his teammate Tiago Adan. De Amorim first played for the club's satellite team in the second league.

De Amorim made his Liga I debut for the main team on 13 May 2011, when coach Tibor Selymes sent him in the 68th minute to replace Sorin Strătilă in a 3–0 away victory against Unirea Urziceni. He scored his first goal in the competition on 14 April 2012 in a 4–0 win over Sportul Studențesc București. Subsequently, he played eight matches in the 2013–14 Europa League qualifying rounds, helping the team get past Domžale, Omonia Nicosia and AS Trenčín, before Astra was defeated by Maccabi Haifa in the play-off. The team won the 2014 Cupa României final, in which coach Daniel Isăilă sent him in the 106th minute to replace Karim Yoda in the eventual penalty shoot-out victory against Steaua București. He then helped them win the 2014 Supercupa României, as Isăilă sent him on at halftime to replace Marian Cristescu in another victory against Steaua. Afterwards, de Amorim played four games in the 2014–15 Europa League qualifiers, as Astra eliminated Slovan Liberec and Lyon, reaching the group stage. There, he scored a goal in the 81st minute for a 1–1 home draw against Celtic Glasgow.

In the 2015–16 season, de Amorim played 30 league games and scored five goals under coach Marius Șumudică, as Astra won the title. Furthermore, he contributed to his side eliminating Inverness and West Ham in the 2015–16 Europa League qualifiers before they were defeated by AZ Alkmaar in the play-off. Subsequently, he scored the only goal in the 86th minute of the 1–0 win against CFR Cluj in the 2016 Supercupa României, a performance which earned him the title of "Man of the match".

=== FCSB ===
On 13 August 2016, FCSB transferred de Amorim from Astra for a €700,000 fee. He managed to open the scoring in his first match for the team in a 1–1 derby draw against Dinamo București. Afterwards, he played six matches in the 2016–17 Europa League group stage.

==== Loan to Kayserispor ====
In January 2018, de Amorim was loaned by FCSB to Kayserispor, where he reunited with coach Șumudică. He made his Süper Lig debut on 22 January, coming on at halftime to replace Atila Turan in a 3–1 loss to Galatasaray. On 15 April, he scored his first league goal and also provided an assist for Deniz Türüç's goal in a 3–2 victory over Gençlerbirliği.

==== Loan to Xanthi ====
In January 2019, de Amorim was sent on loan by FCSB to Xanthi for one and a half years. He made his Super League Greece debut on 9 February, as coach Milan Rastavac sent him in the 71st minute to replace Jeffrey Sarpong in a 0–0 draw against Lamia. His first goal came in the 2019–20 season's opener, in a 2–1 away win against AEK Athens. On 29 September 2019, he netted once in a 3–1 home win against Volos. On 5 December 2019, he scored in a 3–0 home win against Apollon Larissa for the second leg of the Greek Cup round of 32, which helped his team secure a place in the round of 16.

=== Late career ===
In 2020, de Amorim joined Turkish second-tier club Altay, moving to the Brazilian club Esportivo a few months later. In July 2021, he signed with Academica Clinceni. There, he made his last Liga I appearance on 11 March 2022 in a 3–0 away loss to UTA Arad, totaling 196 matches with 18 goals in the competition. In January 2023, de Amorim went to play for Brazilian side São Luiz. Four months later, he moved to União Luziense, where he ended his career in July 2023.

== Personal life ==
De Amorim moved to Romania when he was 18 years old, and on 27 May 2016 he obtained Romanian citizenship. He stated he was open to representing Romania at the international level.

He is a married man and a Christian.

== Career statistics ==
Appearances and goals by club, season and competition
Club	Season	League			National cup		League cup		Continental		Other		Total	
Club	Season	Division	Apps	Goals	Apps	Goals	Apps	Goals	Apps	Goals	Apps	Goals	Apps	Goals
Astra II Ploiești	2010–11	Liga II	24	5	1	0	–		–		–		25	5
Astra II Ploiești	2011–12	Liga II	14	2	2	0	–		–		–		16	2
Astra II Ploiești	Total		38	7	3	0	–		–		–		41	7
Astra Giurgiu	2010–11	Liga I	1	0	–		–		–		–		1	0
Astra Giurgiu	2011–12	Liga I	13	2	0	0	–		–		–		13	2
Astra Giurgiu	2012–13	Liga I	21	0	2	0	–		–		–		23	0
Astra Giurgiu	2013–14	Liga I	30	4	5	0	–		8 (Note: Appearances in UEFA Europa League)	0	–		43	4
Astra Giurgiu	2014–15	Liga I	31	5	1	0	4	0	10	1 (Note: Appearance in Supercupa României)	1	0	47	6
Astra Giurgiu	2015–16	Liga I	30	5	1	0	2	0	6	0	–		39	5
Astra Giurgiu	2016–17	Liga I	3	0	–		–		2 (Note: Appearances in UEFA Champions League)	0	1	1	6	1
Astra Giurgiu	Total		129	16	9	0	6	0	26	1	2	1	172	18
FCSB	2016–17	Liga I	32	2	1	0	2	0	6	0	–		41	2
FCSB	2017–18	Liga I	7	1	2	1	–		3 (Note: Two appearances in UEFA Champions League, one appearance in UEFA Europa League)	0	–		12	2
FCSB	Total		39	3	3	1	2	0	9	0	–		53	4
Kayserispor (loan)	2017–18	Süper Lig	12	1	3	1	–		–		–		15	2
Xanthi (loan)	2018–19	Super League Greece	11	0	–		–		–		–		11	0
Xanthi (loan)	2019–20	Super League Greece	26	2	2	1	–		–		–		28	3
Xanthi (loan)	Total		37	2	2	1	–		–		–		39	3
Altay	2020–21	TFF 1. Lig	2	0	1	0	–		–		–		3	0
Esportivo	2021	Brasileiro Série D	0	0	1	0	–		–		9 (Note: Appearances in Campeonato Gaúcho)	1	10	1
Academica Clinceni	2021–22	Liga I	29	0	1	0	–		–		–		30	0
São Luiz	2023	Brasileiro Série D	0	0	1	0	–		–		5	0	6	0
União Luziense	2023	Brasileiro Série D	0	0	0	0	–		–		5 (Note: Appearances in Campeonato Mineiro Módulo II)	1	5	1
Career total			286	28	24	3	8	0	35	1	21	3	374	35

== Honours ==
Astra Giurgiu

- Liga I: 2015–16
- Cupa României: 2013–14
- Supercupa României: 2014, 2016
