= Ioan Niculae =

Romanian businessman (born 1954)

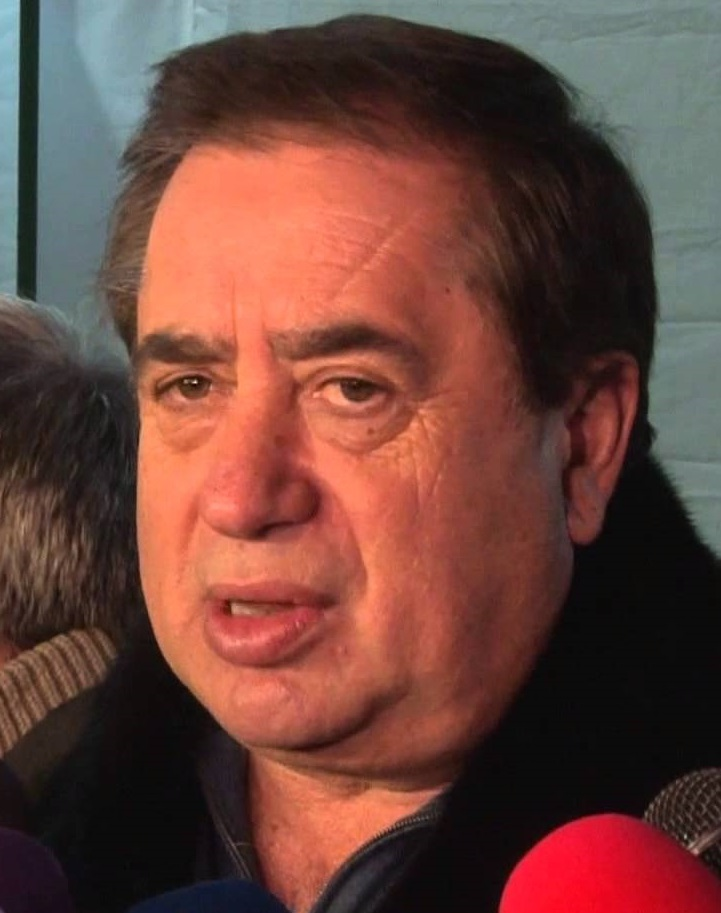
- Niculae in 2013
- Born: 19 July 1954 (age 71); Buturugeni, Romania
- Education: Ștefan Gheorghiu Academy
- Occupation: Businessman
- Known for: Owner of InterAgro and Astra Giurgiu

Ioan Niculae (born 19 July 1954) is a Romanian businessman, best known for his ownership of InterAgro and the Astra Giurgiu football club. In August 2018, his net worth was estimated at $700 million.

== Overview ==
He is the owner of the InterAgro group, Romania's leading agricultural and fertilizer conglomerate, with revenues in excess of €630 million in 2012.

Through his company, Niculae manages approximately 50,000 hectares of agricultural fields and is the biggest Romanian cereal cultivator. He is also the owner of 170 hectares of vineyards, reaping their first harvest in 2008.

Since 2004, the total amount of agricultural investments done by his company has surpassed €100 million.

Niculae was accused of being an informer of Securitate, the secret police agency of Communist Romania.

In the 2013 Forbes list of billionaires, Niculae was stated to have an estimated fortune of $1.2 billion, holding the 1372nd position. He is the third Romanian to be featured in the magazine, after Dinu Patriciu and Ion Țiriac.

Since 1996 Niculae has been the owner of the Astra Giurgiu football team.

In 2021 Ioan Niculae was sentenced to 5 years in prison for tax evasion, money laundering and influence buying, being involved in many corruption cases.

== Biography ==
He entered the business world after 1990, setting up, alongside a Turkish partner, a chemical trade company – Interaction.

In 1995, he founded InterAgro, a Romanian-Chinese joint venture.

In 1997, Niculae became the majority stakeholder of the Astra Ploiesti refinery, after a $16 million investment.

In 1998, he bought into the Romanian insurance company Asirom, after investing $21 million. He sold those stocks in 2007, making a profit of $65 million.

He has been subject to many controversies, stemming from his business practices in the oil and gas industry. He has denied all charges.

In 2012, The Romanian National Tax Administration accused Niculae of defrauding the national budget due to accusations that his tobacco company, Galaxy Tobacco, had failed to pay its taxes, amounting to an excess of €120 million. Niculae fought the charges in Court and won.

In 2013, Niculae faced negative press after state prosecutors alleged that two Romanian politicians gave InterAgro favorable gas discounts from 2006 to 2010.

That same year, 2013, Niculae founded the Romanian Investors Council.

On April 2, 2015 he was jailed for 2 1/2 years for illegal financing the PSD electoral campaign from 2009.

== Personal life ==
In 2013, Niculae filed divorce from his wife, Domnita Niculae, ending a 31-year-old marriage. The divorce trial is still pending.

He is the father of three children.

== See also ==
- List of corruption scandals in Romania
