= Vincent Laban =

French-born Cypriot football player (born 1984)

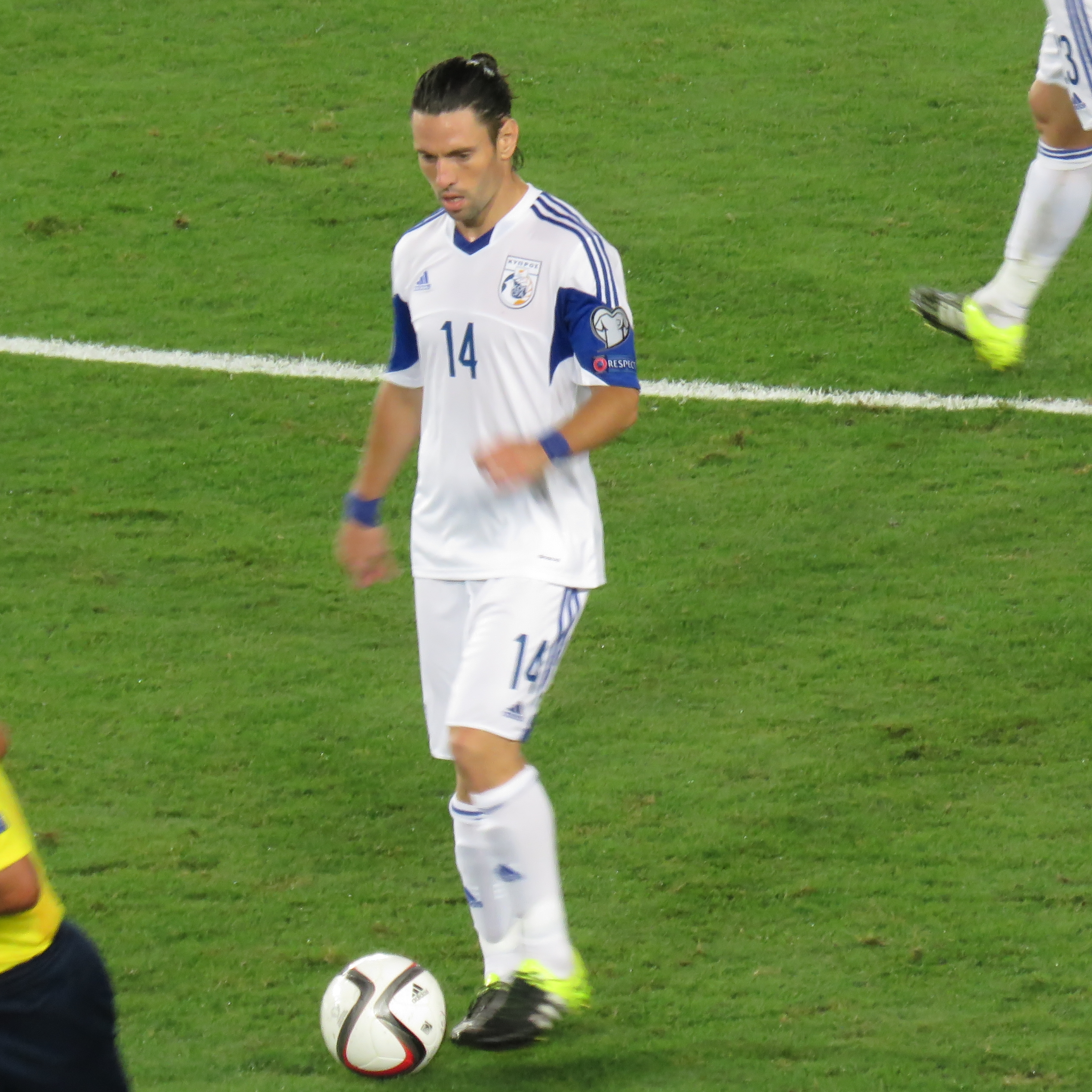
- Laban with Cyprus in 2015

Personal information
- Full name: Vincent Fabien Laban Bounayre
- Date of birth: 9 September 1984 (age 42)
- Place of birth: Pau, France
- Height: 1.74 m (5 ft 9 in)
- Position: Midfielder

Senior career*
Years	Team	Apps	(Gls)
2001–2005	Nantes B	62	(6)
2005–2007	Digenis Morphou	42	(8)
2007–2013	Anorthosis	192	(19)
2013–2015	Astra Giurgiu	51	(0)
2015–2019	AEK Larnaca	82	(0)
2019–2020	Ethnikos Achna	15	(2)
Total		444	(35)

International career^{‡}
2012–2019	Cyprus	36	(3)
- * Club domestic league appearances and goals as of 19:00, 16 June 2020 (UTC) ‡ National team caps and goals as of 25 May 2018

Vincent Fabien Laban Bounayre (Greek: Βενσάν Φαμπιάν Λαμπάν Μπουναίρ; born 9 September 1984) is a French-born naturalized Cypriot professional footballer who played as a midfielder.

Laban began his career with the reserves of Nantes, where he played for three years before moving to Cypriot team Digenis Akritas Morphou. In 2007, he transferred to Anorthosis and won the championship title in his debut season. Laban also had a stint at Astra Giurgiu in Romania between 2013 and 2015, after which he returned to Cyprus.

Born in France, he became a Cypriot citizen after spending seven years in the country and subsequently began playing for the national team in 2012.

== Club career ==
=== Anorthosis Famagusta ===
==== Season 2007–08 ====
Laban signed with Anorthosis in the summer of 2007 from Digenis Akritas Morphou. In his first season with Anorthosis he won the First Division, scoring three league goals in 25 matches.

==== Season 2008–09 ====
Laban scored a goal in the second qualifying round of the UEFA Champions League tie against Rapid Vienna, which Anorthosis won 4–3 on aggregate. He also scored two goals, the first and third, of the 3–0 win against Olympiacos at Antonis Papadopoulos Stadium in Cyprus, and despite Anorthosis' defeat in Piraeus by 1–0, with a goal by Fernando Belluschi, he contributed to Anorthosis' playing in the Champions League. Laban finished the season with 25 appearances out of 32 league matches.

==== Season 2009–10 ====
Anorthosis started their season with a 5–0 win against UN Käerjéng 97. In the second qualification round Anorthosis won a home match against OFK Petrovac, with a 2–1 score, with a goal from Laban. Anorthosis lost an away match 3–1 and subsequently left the Europa League. In the First Division he contributed 2 goals in 26 matches. Anorthosis finished third in the league with a loss of 10 points to the eventual champions AC Omonia.

==== Season 2010–11 ====
Laban played two matches against Banants for the First qualifying round of the Europa League. Anorthosis won both matches and Laban scored the only goal in Hanrapetakan Stadium in Yerevan. Laban scored his second European goal of the season in a match against Sibenik in Stadion Hrvatski vitezovi. Anorthosis, which, despite being defeated in Larnaca 0–2, defeated Sibenik in Dugopolje 3–0 and progressed to the next round. Laban also scored in Anorthosis' the first game of 2011 against the Cypriot championship leader APOEL, by scoring the first goal of the game, which Anorthosis won 2–0. Laban also scored a goal in the next match against Olympiakos Nicosia after a penalty kick in the 86th minute: the final score of the game was 2–2. Laban scored again in the game against AEL, marking the team's first goal in the 43rd minute, as Anorthosis won 4–0. The French midfielder also scored against Enosis Paralimni, in the eighth minute by a header and in the 11th minute after a penalty kick; he helped Anorthosis win with a 3–1 score at Antonis Papadopoulos Stadium. He also scored in the away match against APEP in the 20th minute, helping to gain another Anorthosis win. He also scored in the home game against APEP, this time in the 64th minute. Laban has scored again, against Doxa in the sixth minute but that match ended as a 2–2 draw. He ended the 2010–2011 regular season as the second highest scorer of the team, with 9 goals, after Anorthosis' striker, Semedo Cafu, who scored 13 goals.

==== Season 2011–12 ====
In the summer of 2011, Laban renewed his contract with Anorthosis for another five years. Laban scored his first goal of the season against Ethnikos Achna on 16 December 2011. He scored several other goals in the 2011–2012 season, including one in the cup match against PAEEK FC, which his club won 6–0, as well as one during the home championship match against Ethnikos, won by Anorthosis 2–0. Laban scored the first goal against Ermis, in the "friendly" 2–0 win, on 30 December 2011. He scored the winning goal against ENP, with a 77th-minute penalty kick. On Saturday 14 January 2012, Laban scored his second penalty goal of the season against Enosis Paralimni in a 1–0 Anorthosis victory.

=== Astra Giurgiu ===
==== Season 2013–14 ====
On 13 June 2013, after eight years in Cyprus, Laban moved to Romania and signed a two-year contract with Astra Giurgiu.

== International career ==
Laban being born in France and of ethnic French heritage made him eligible to represent France but after seven years playing football in Cyprus he applied and gained Cypriot citizenship which made him eligible to represent Cyprus at International level. When the opportunity came up, he decided to represent his adopted nation and made his debut for Cyprus on 15 August 2012, in the 0–1 loss against Bulgaria in a friendly match. He scored his first ever International goal for the Cypriots in a 3–1 away defeat to Albania in the opening game of a 2014 FIFA World Cup qualification group game on 7 September 2012. His second ever Cypriot goal came in a 2–1 away defeat to Wales in a UEFA Euro 2016 qualification group game on 13 October 2014. Aware of the need to convince the rest of the country that he belonged in the national side, Laban admitted to feeling a great deal of pressure.

"I was scared of being out of place, of not being accepted by the fans and the team, of being seen as a foreigner who was taking the place of local players," he recalled. "Every time I went to the national side, I had to prove that I deserved to wear the shirt. I also felt a little self-conscious about the fact I don't speak Greek very well, even though I understand it."

Laban was determined to win the fans over: "I asked myself how I might be able to reach out to them, so I decided to learn the national anthem. It was an important symbolic gesture as far as I was concerned, because it's a sign of your attachment to your country. That's why I learned it. I was so nervous, though. I focused hard on the words and did all I could not to make a mistake." The impact was immediate, as Cyprus' 1.2 million fanatical football fans took Laban to their hearts. Three years on from his international debut, Laban has become an inspirational force in Cyprus' surprisingly strong start to their UEFA EURO 2016 qualifying campaign.

The Galanolefki lie third in Group B, behind Israel and Wales but ahead of Belgium, who have a match in hand. Also trailing in their wake are Bosnia and Herzegovina, who appeared at the 2014 FIFA World Cup Brazil and then lost at home to the unfancied Cypriots last September.

"We put in a terrific performance there, because they've got the likes of Edin Dzeko and Miralem Pjanic and they're a very good side," said Laban, who celebrated his 30th birthday that day and is hoping for another dream result against Belgium in Brussels on Saturday.

Acknowledging just how hard that task will be, he said: "We've made a good start to the qualifiers and I'm hoping we can keep it going. It's going to be very tough, though. In football you have to be realistic and know your place."

== Career statistics ==
=== Club ===
As of 25 May 2018

Appearances and goals by club, season and competition
Club	Season	League		Cup		Europe		Total	
Club	Season	Apps	Goals	Apps	Goals	Apps	Goals	Apps	Goals
Nantes B	2001–02	0	0	0	0	–	–	0	0
Nantes B	2002–03	10	0	0	0	–	–	10	0
Nantes B	2003–04	28	2	0	0	–	–	28	2
Nantes B	2004–05	25	4	0	0	–	–	25	4
Digenis Morphou	2005–06	22	1	2	0	–	–	24	1
Digenis Morphou	2006–07	20	7	3	0	–	–	23	7
Anorthosis	2007–08	25	3	9	0	2	0	36	3
Anorthosis	2008–09	25	0	0	0	12	2	37	2
Anorthosis	2009–10	26	2	3	0	4	1	33	3
Anorthosis	2010–11	25	9	3	1	7	2	35	12
Anorthosis	2011–12	28	2	4	0	4	0	36	2
Anorthosis	2012–13	21	0	3	0	4	0	28	0
Astra Giurgiu	2013–14	29	0	3	0	4	0	36	0
Astra Giurgiu	2014–15	22	0	4	0	8	0	34	0
AEK Larnaca	2015–16	24	0	0	0	1	0	25	0
AEK Larnaca	2016–17	27	0	0	0	3	0	30	0
AEK Larnaca	2017–18	28	0	1	0	7	0	36	0
Career total		390	30	35	1	56	5	476	36

=== International ===
Scores and results list Cyprus' goal tally first.

#	Date	Venue	Opponent	Score	Result	Competition
1.	7 September 2012	Qemal Stafa Stadium, Tirana, Albania	Albania	1–1	1–3	2014 FIFA World Cup qualification
2.	13 October 2014	Cardiff City Stadium, Cardiff, Wales	Wales	1–2	1–2	UEFA Euro 2016 qualification
3.	31 August 2017	GSP Stadium, Nicosia, Cyprus	Bosnia and Herzegovina	2–2	3–2	2018 FIFA World Cup qualification

== Honours ==
Anorthosis

- Cypriot First Division: 2007–08
- Cypriot Cup runner-up: 2007–08
- LTV Super Cup runner-up: 2008

Astra Giurgiu

- Cupa României: 2013–14
- Supercupa României: 2014

AEK Larnaca

- Cypriot Cup: 2017–18
