= Constantin Budescu =

Romanian footballer (born 1989)

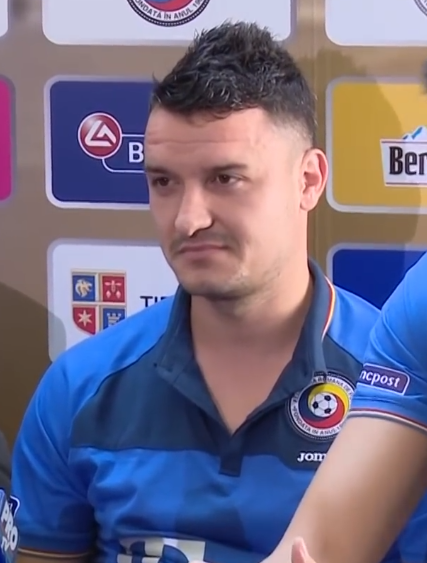
- Budescu with Romania in 2015

Personal information
- Full name: Constantin Valentin Budescu
- Date of birth: 19 February 1989 (age 37)
- Place of birth: Manasia, Romania
- Height: 1.86 m (6 ft 1 in)
- Positions: Attacking midfielder; forward

Team information
- Current team: Kids Tâmpa Brașov
- Number: 10

Youth career
- 2001–2003: Rapid Sălciile
- 2003–2005: Petrolul Ploiești

Senior career*
Years	Team	Apps	(Gls)
2005–2010	Petrolul Ploiești	149	(46)
2011–2016	Astra Giurgiu	115	(43)
2011	Astra II	5	(1)
2016–2017	Dalian Yifang	4	(0)
2016	→ Astra Giurgiu (loan)	15	(4)
2017	Astra Giurgiu	12	(2)
2017–2018	FCSB	27	(9)
2018–2019	Al-Shabab	22	(7)
2019–2021	Astra Giurgiu	37	(14)
2021	Damac	12	(0)
2021–2022	FCSB	10	(1)
2022	Voluntari	11	(2)
2022–2023	Petrolul Ploiești	20	(3)
2023–2024	Farul Constanța	25	(6)
2024–2025	Gloria Buzău	23	(5)
2025	Tunari	7	(1)
2026–	Kids Tâmpa Brașov	0	(0)

International career
2015–2021	Romania	14	(5)
- * Club domestic league appearances and goals

Constantin Valentin Budescu (Romanian pronunciation: [konstanˈtin valenˈtin buˈdesku]; born 19 February 1989) is a Romanian professional footballer who plays as an attacking midfielder or a forward for Liga III club Kids Tâmpa Brașov.

Budescu began his senior career at Petrolul Ploiești, amassing over 150 appearances throughout the course of six seasons before transferring to rival team Astra Ploiești in 2011. With the latter side, which relocated to Giurgiu, he won one Liga I, one Cupa României, and one Supercupa României. Since first leaving Astra in 2016, he has had multiple brief spells, of which three abroad with clubs in China and Saudi Arabia.

Budescu registered his debut for the Romania national team in 2015, at age 26. In 2017, he was awarded the Romanian Footballer of the Year trophy by the Gazeta Sporturilor newspaper.

== Club career ==
=== Early career / Petrolul Ploiești ===
Budescu was born in Manasia, a commune near Urziceni, Ialomița County. At the age of 12, with his first team Rapid Sălciile, he once scored "13 goals in one match". In 2007, Budescu made his debut in the Liga II for Petrolul Ploiești while still a junior player.

He gradually imposed himself as a regular first-team member, which caught the eye of Rapid București, Politehnica Timișoara and FC Brașov. In 2009, following the transfer of Laurențiu Marinescu to Unirea Urziceni, Budescu took over his number 10 jersey.

=== Astra Giurgiu ===
In the summer of 2011, Budescu signed a contract with cross-town rivals Astra Ploiești, later relocated and renamed Astra Giurgiu. On 21 July 2013, he scored his first hat-trick in the Liga I, in a 4–0 away win against Viitorul Constanța. Four days later, during their first ever appearance in the UEFA Europa League, he netted twice in a 2–1 success at Omonia as his team played 30 minutes with one player less and qualified to the third round; due to his exploits, he was dubbed the "Hero of Nicosia".

On 21 August 2014, Budescu converted a penalty against French side Lyon in the first leg of the Europa League play-off (2–1 away win, qualification on the away goals rule). On 6 August of the following year, in the same competition but in the third qualifying round, his second leg brace helped defeat West Ham United 2–1 at home and 4–3 on aggregate.

=== Dalian Yifang ===
In January 2016, Astra rejected an offer from FC Steaua București for Budescu. The following month, he signed a three-year contract with China League One club Dalian Yifang for an undisclosed fee, with a salary worth €3 million plus €500,000 upon signature.

=== Return to Astra Giurgiu ===
Budescu was loaned to his previous club Astra Giurgiu in August 2016, before being released by the Asians the following January. On the 26th that month, he chose to stay once again with Astra, joining on a one-and-a-half-year contract. On 16 February, Budescu netted a goal against Genk in a 2–2 Europa League round of 32 home draw.

=== FCSB ===
On 10 June 2017, FCSB activated Budescu's €750,000 release clause. He subsequently signed a four-year deal with the club, being assigned the number 11 shirt. Budescu scored on his debut on 16 July, in a 2–1 home victory against Voluntari. He again found the net nine days later, converting a free kick in 2–2 home draw with Viktoria Plzeň in the Champions League third qualifying round.

On 20 December, Budescu was announced by the Gazeta Sporturilor newspaper as the winner of the 2017 Romanian Footballer of the Year award. On 15 February 2018, he provided an assist as Harlem Gnohéré scored the only goal of a Europa League round of 32 first leg match with Lazio.

=== Al-Shabab ===
On 28 June 2018, Budescu agreed to a three-year deal with Saudi Professional League team Al-Shabab for a reported transfer fee of €2.5 million, rejoining his former Astra Giurgiu head coach Marius Șumudică.

=== Late career ===
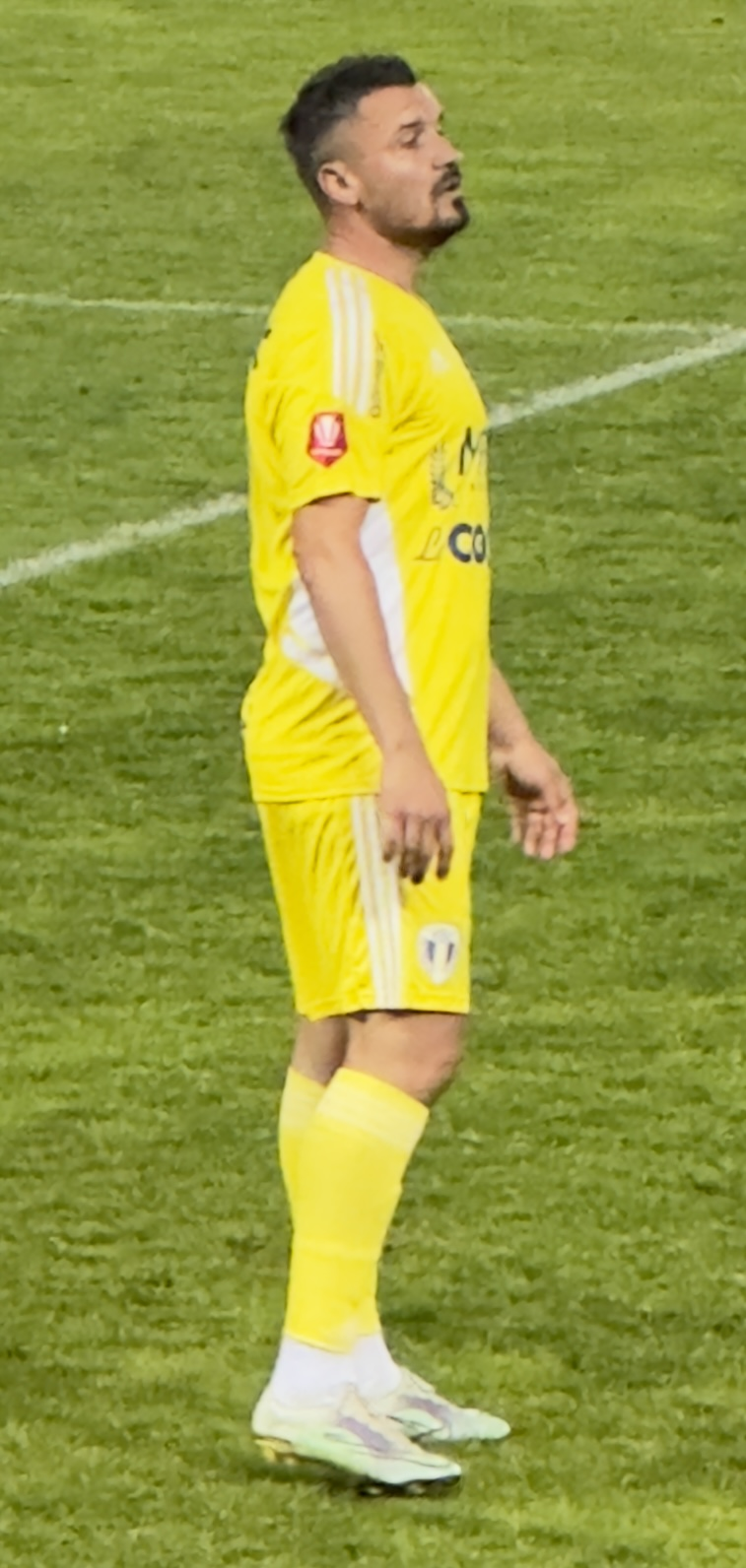
Budescu on his Liga I debut for Petrolul Ploiești, in October 2022.

On 19 August 2019, Astra Giurgiu owner Ioan Niculae confirmed that Budescu returned for a fourth stint at the club after agreeing to a two-year contract. On 8 February 2021, he signed for Saudi Professional League team Damac.

After only twelve games during the remainder of the 2020–21 season, Budescu returned to Romania with FCSB. He left them on 4 January 2022 on a mutual agreement, after only scoring once and being criticised by owner Gigi Becali for his performances. Fifteen days later, he put pen to paper on a contract with Voluntari.

On 2 August 2022, Budescu returned to his boyhood club Petrolul Ploiești, which had recently promoted back to the Liga I. He signed a two-year deal and was given the number 10 shirt. After recovering from a long-term injury, Budescu registered his first appearance and goal in the top flight for Petrolul on 24 October, converting a penalty in a 2–0 home win over Argeș Pitești. On 2 August 2023, he left the team on a mutual agreement, two days after publicly stating that he is not content with his playing time.

On 4 August 2023, Budescu agreed to a deal with defending champions Farul Constanța. Six days later, he scored and provided an assist in a 3–0 home victory against Estonian side Flora in the third qualifying round of the Europa Conference League. After being left out from all matchday squads for the fixtures in April and May, Budescu and Farul Constanța mutually agreed to terminate his contract on 11 May 2024.

On 13 July 2024, Budescu signed a contract with Gloria Buzău, newly promoted to the Liga I.

== International career ==
Budescu played an unofficial match for Romania B in a 1–4 friendly defeat against Poland, in February 2013. His debut for the full side was made two years later, as he came on as a 78th-minute substitute in a 0–0 away draw against Hungary for the UEFA Euro 2016 qualifiers.

On 11 October 2015, Budescu scored a brace against the Faroe Islands, helping the country achieve qualification by finishing second in the group one point behind Northern Ireland.

== Style of play ==
Budescu is regarded as a skilful player who can create chances and goalscoring opportunities for both himself and his teammates. Hence, he has been deployed in a wide number of positions, such as an attacking midfielder, a winger, a supporting striker or even a main striker.

Budescu's shot accuracy allows him to be an exceptional free kick and penalty kick taker, and he is known to sometimes put opposing goalkeepers to test from long range or even from corner kicks. In spite of his undeniable talent, he has often been criticised for his lack of work rate, himself stating that he "only got serious [...] after turning 30 years old".

== Personal life ==
In October 2014, Budescu married his partner Mădălina in the city of Ploiești, with then Astra Giurgiu teammate Daniel Coman acting as best man. He is nicknamed Sărmăluță (Romanian for "little Sarma"), due to his weakness for traditional food and body weight issues.

== Career statistics ==
=== Club ===
As of match played 25 October 2025

Appearances and goals by club, season and competition
Club	Season	League			National cup (Note: Includes Cupa României, King's Cup)		League cup (Note: Includes Cupa Ligii)		Continental		Other		Total	
Club	Season	Division	Apps	Goals	Apps	Goals	Apps	Goals	Apps	Goals	Apps	Goals	Apps	Goals
Petrolul Ploiești	2005–06	Divizia B	13	4	1	0	—		—		—		14	4
Petrolul Ploiești	2006–07	Liga II	32	7	—		—		—		—		32	7
Petrolul Ploiești	2007–08	Liga II	34	10	—		—		—		—		34	10
Petrolul Ploiești	2008–09	Liga II	27	4	3	1	—		—		—		30	5
Petrolul Ploiești	2009–10	Liga II	31	14	—		—		—		—		31	14
Petrolul Ploiești	2010–11	Liga II	12	7	2	2	—		—		—		14	9
Petrolul Ploiești	Total		149	46	6	3	—		—		—		155	49
Astra Giurgiu	2010–11	Liga I	6	0	—		—		—		—		6	0
Astra Giurgiu	2011–12	Liga I	9	0	0	0	—		—		—		9	0
Astra Giurgiu	2012–13	Liga I	26	12	5	3	—		—		—		31	15
Astra Giurgiu	2013–14	Liga I	28	13	6	4	—		7 (Note: Appearances in UEFA Europa League)	3	—		41	20
Astra Giurgiu	2014–15	Liga I	28	10	0	0	3	2	10	1	1 (Note: Appearance in Supercupa României)	0	42	13
Astra Giurgiu	2015–16	Liga I	18	8	2	1	1	0	6	3	—		27	12
Astra Giurgiu	Total		115	43	13	8	4	2	23	7	1	0	156	60
Dalian Yifang	2016	China League One	4	0	—		—		—		—		4	0
Astra Giurgiu (loan)	2016–17	Liga I	15	4	1	0	1	1	6	1	—		23	6
Astra Giurgiu	2016–17	Liga I	12	2	4	4	—		2	1	—		18	7
FCSB	2017–18	Liga I	27	9	1	0	—		9 (Note: Two appearances and one goal in UEFA Champions League, seven appearances and three goals in UEFA Europa League)	4	—		37	13
Al-Shabab	2018–19	Saudi Pro League	22	7	2	1	—		—		—		24	8
Astra Giurgiu	2019–20	Liga I	19	6	1	0	0	0	0	0	—		20	6
Astra Giurgiu	2020–21	Liga I	18	8	0	0	0	0	0	0	—		18	8
Astra Giurgiu	Total		37	14	1	0	0	0	0	0	—		38	14
Damac	2020–21	Saudi Pro League	12	0	0	0	—		—		—		12	0
FCSB	2021–22	Liga I	10	1	1	0	—		—		—		11	1
Voluntari	2021–22	Liga I	11	2	0	0	—		—		—		11	2
Petrolul Ploiești	2022–23	Liga I	17	3	3	0	—		—		—		20	3
Petrolul Ploiești	2023–24	Liga I	3	0	—		—		—		—		3	0
Petrolul Ploiești	Total		20	3	3	0	0	0	0	0	—		23	3
Farul Constanța	2023–24	Liga I	25	6	0	0	—		4 (Note: Appearances in UEFA Europa Conference League)	2	—		29	8
Gloria Buzău	2024–25	Liga I	23	5	1	0	—		—		—		24	5
Tunari	2025–26	Liga II	7	1	—		—		—		—		7	1
Kids Tâmpa Brașov	2026–27	Liga III	0	0	—		—		—		—		0	0
Career total			489	143	33	16	5	3	44	15	1	0	572	177

=== International ===
As of match played 6 June 2021

Appearances and goals by national team and year
National team	Year	Apps	Goals
Romania	2015	4	2
Romania	2017	4	2
Romania	2018	4	1
Romania	2021	2	0
Total		14	5

Scores and results list Romania's goal tally first, score column indicates score after each Budescu goal.

List of international goals scored by Constantin Budescu
No.	Date	Venue	Opponent	Score	Result	Competition
1	11 October 2015	Tórsvøllur, Tórshavn, Faroe Islands	Faroe Islands	1–0	3–0	UEFA Euro 2016 qualifying
2	11 October 2015	Tórsvøllur, Tórshavn, Faroe Islands	Faroe Islands	2–0	3–0	UEFA Euro 2016 qualifying
3	5 October 2017	Ilie Oană, Ploiești, Romania	Kazakhstan	1–0	3–1	2018 FIFA World Cup qualification
4	5 October 2017	Ilie Oană, Ploiești, Romania	Kazakhstan	2–0	3–1	2018 FIFA World Cup qualification
5	31 May 2018	Sportzentrum Graz-Weinzödl, Graz, Austria	Chile	3–2	3–2	Friendly

== Honours ==
Astra Giurgiu

- Liga I: 2015–16
- Cupa României: 2013–14; runner-up 2016–17, 2020–21
- Supercupa României: 2014

Voluntari

- Cupa României runner-up: 2021–22

Individual

- Gazeta Sporturilor Romanian Footballer of the Year: 2017; runner-up: 2015
- Gala Fotbalului Românesc Romanian Footballer of the Year: 2015, 2017
- Liga I Team of the Season: 2016–17, 2017–18
- Liga I Team of the Championship Play-Offs: 2017–18
- DigiSport Liga I Player of the Month: July 2013, August 2013, July 2015, August 2015, December 2016
