= FC Astra Giurgiu =

Association football club in Giurgiu

Astra Giurgiu
- Full name: Asociația Fotbal Club Astra Giurgiu
- Nicknames: Astralii; Giurgiuvenii (The Giurgiu People)
- Short name: Astra
- Founded: 18 September 1921 as Clubul Sportiv Astra-Română
- Dissolved: 19 October 2022
- Ground: Astra and Marin Anastasovici
- Capacity: 8,200

Asociația Fotbal Club Astra Giurgiu (Romanian pronunciation: [ˈastra ˈdʒjurdʒju]), commonly known as Astra Giurgiu or simply Astra, was a Romanian football club last based in the city of Giurgiu, Giurgiu County. Founded in 1921 in Ploiești as Clubul Sportiv Astra-Română, it spent most of its history in the lower leagues.

Astra Ploiești only began to achieve success in the late 1990s under the ownership of businessman Ioan Niculae, having reached the top flight for the first time in the 1998–99 season. In 2012, after more than nine decades in Prahova County, it moved its home ground south to Giurgiu, a city at the border with Bulgaria. On short notice, Astra became a prominent figure in Romanian football and head coach Marius Șumudică won it the 2015–16 national title.

The club also held one Cupa României and two Supercupa României trophies. Between 2017 and 2021, Astra lost three Cupa României finals, all played on the home ground of its former local opponent, Petrolul Ploiești. Internationally, its best performance was reaching the UEFA Europa League round of 32 in the 2016–17 season. After losing the financial support of its owner Niculae, in October 2022 the team withdrew from the Liga III championship and was subsequently dissolved.

The colours of the team were white and black, hence the old nickname Dracii negri (The Black Devils). Red was also worn on many occasions on the away kits. Their last home stadium was Marin Anastasovici, which has a capacity of 8,500, but spent most of their history at the namesake Astra Stadium in Ploiești.

== History ==
Name changes
Year	Name
1921	Clubul Sportiv Astra-Română
1934	Astra Română Câmpina
1937	Astra Română Ploiești
1938	Colombia Ploiești
1945	Astra Română Ploiești
1959	Rafinorul Ploiești
1990	CS Astra Ploiești
1996	AS Danubiana Ploiești
1998	SC FC Astra Ploiești
2005	CSM Ploiești
2007	FC Ploiești
2009	FC Astra Ploiești
2012	FC Astra Giurgiu

=== Founding, early years and lower divisions (1921–1996) ===
On 18 September 1921, the weekly newspaper Ecoul Sportiv announced the founding of the Clubul Sportiv Astra-Română ("Astra-Romanian Sports Club") by the Astra-Română Society, an oil-company owned by Henri Deterding and based in Prahova and composed of English, American and Dutch officials.

Initially, the club consisted of several football sides based in towns from the entire county. In the summer of 1934, the refinery organised the inaugural edition of a tournament open for all the Astra teams, called the Astra Societies Cup. The matches were played in the town of Moreni. At the time, the refinery had only one team, Astra Română Câmpina, that was playing in the district championship. To make the cup more attractive, the society created three new football sides for the event: Astra Română Moreni, Astra Română Boldești and Astra Română Unirea Hârsa. After the 1937 edition of the Cup, the society decided to merge all of its Prahova teams and thus created Astra Română Ploiești on 29 May 1937. The team was registered in the district championship. Just a few months after the team's foundation, the society changed its name to Columbia and moved it to a ground located near the society's headquarters, in Câmpina. In May 1945, Astra Română Ploiești was reformed and played its home matches on the old Columbia Stadium, a stadium that still exists today in Ploiești and was used as a training ground by the team.

In the summer of 1992, Astra were promoted for the first time to the Divizia C. The following seasons it finished 6th, 12th, 3rd and 14th in the championship.

=== Ascent under Niculae's ownership (1996–2013) ===
In the summer of 1996, the club merged with Danubiana București, it changed its name to Danubiana Ploiești, and played for the first time in the Divizia B. After one season the club changed its name back to Astra. Since that year, Ioan Niculae had been the owner of the team. In 1998, Astra were promoted to the Divizia A for the first time. They played at this level for five consecutive seasons, until 2003, when it merged with Petrolul Ploiești. Two years of pause pass for Astra, until 2005, when Ioan Niculae founded once again the club directly in the Liga II. It was relegated to the Liga III after only one season. In the summer of 2007, under the name of FC Ploiești, the team promoted back to the Liga II. In 2009, after six years, it finally promoted back to Liga I, with promotion achieved at the end of the 2008–09 season. It changed its name back to the traditional Astra Ploiești and the black and white colours were brought back, hence the team's old nickname, "The Black Devils".

After 91 years in Ploiești, in September 2012, the club moved to Giurgiu. The last match played in the Astra Stadium was on 2 September 2012, against Bucharest giants Dinamo București, won by Astra 1–0. The first game played on the Marin Anastasovici Stadium was on 23 September 2012, against Gaz Metan Mediaș. Astra won 4–0.

It qualified for the first time to the UEFA Europa League at the end of the 2012–13 Liga I season, after finishing 4th in the table.

The 2013–14 season was, at the time, the most successful season in the club's history, reaching 2nd place in Liga I, losing the title by only five points to Steaua București and winning the Romanian Cup on penalties against the same team, Steaua. One month later they defeated Steaua București on penalties again, and won the Romanian Supercup.

=== Debut in European competitions and Șumudică era (2013–2017) ===
Astra Giurgiu played its first European match ever in first qualification round of UEFA Europa League against Domžale, winning 1–0 in the first leg. In the second leg in Bucharest, Astra won 2–0 and qualified. In the second qualification round, Astra draw 1–1 with Omonia in the first leg in Bucharest and beat 2–1 in the second leg in Nicosia to advance. Seeded team after eliminating Omonia, Astra was drawn in third qualification round with Trenčín and qualified after winning 3–1 the first leg in Dubnica nad Váhom and drawing 2–2 in the second leg in Bucharest. In play-off, Astra faced the very first European defeat in a 0–2 against Maccabi Haifa in the first leg in Haifa, thus being eliminated after drawing 1–1 in the second leg in Bucharest.

Astra qualified directly in the third qualifying round after winning the Romanian Cup and met Slovan Liberec, winning both legs 3–0 in Giurgiu and 3–2 in Liberec, this time being the first European match to take place in Giurgiu. In the play-off round, Astra met Olympique Lyonnais, defeating them away in Lyon in a 2–1 win, with Kehinde Fatai and Constantin Budescu scoring the goals of victory. In Giurgiu, Lyon won 1–0 but Astra Giurgiu went on to the group stage phase due to the away goals rule. They were subsequently drawn in Group D alongside Red Bull Salzburg, Celtic and Dinamo Zagreb. Astra began their group stage adventure with a harmful 1–5 defeat at Stadion Maksimir in Zagreb against Croatian champions Dinamo, ending with Aurelian Chițu scoring their first goal in the group stages of a European cup. On 2 October 2014, Astra played Red Bull Salzburg one of the most important matches held on Marin Anastasovici Stadium in Giurgiu. Astra took the 1–0 lead with Takayuki Seto's goal, but were stunned by Jonatan Soriano's winner, losing 1–2. On matchday 3, Astra faced Celtic at Glasgow in a match which ended 1–2. On matchday 4, Astra hold Celtic in a 1–1 draw at Giurgiu, with William Amorim scoring the equaliser that brought their first group stage point. On matchday 5, Astra won 1–0 against Dinamo Zagreb with Sadat Bukari's winner, and secured its first ever victory in the Europa League group stages. Astra's Europa League campaign concluded at Red Bull Arena in Salzburg with another heavy 1–5 defeat to Red Bull. Astra ended in fourth place with four points, behind Salzburg (16 points), Celtic (8) and Dinamo (6).

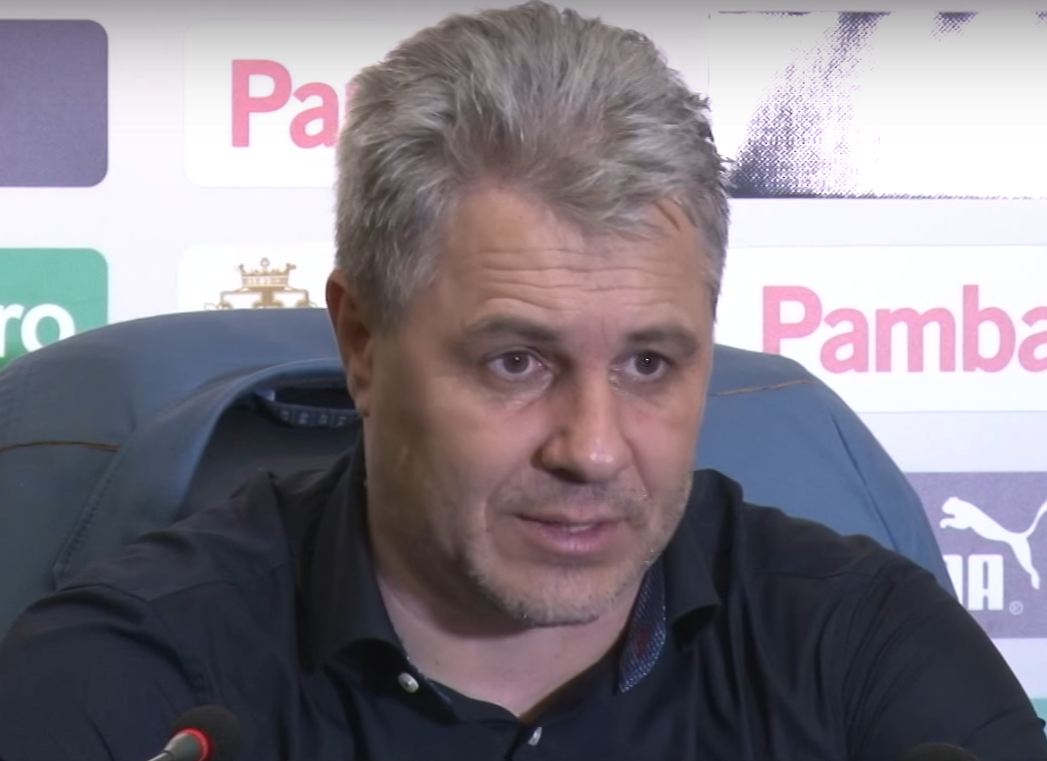
Marius Șumudică led Astra to the 2015–16 Liga I title, the first in the history of the club.

On 28 April 2015, Marius Șumudică was appointed as the new head coach, following Dorinel Munteanu's resignation. It would be Sumudica's third term at the club, following two short spells in 2009 and 2011. His first game in charge was a 2–1 away victory against rivals Petrolul Ploiești. He eventually led the team to a fourth-place finish, assuring qualification for the 2015–16-second round of the UEFA Europa League.

In the second round of the Europa League, Astra were paired with Inverness Caledonian Thistle, which resulted in a 1–0 Astra win on aggregate after a goal from Constantin Budescu. The third round proved to be extremely difficult, however, as Astra was drawn with English club West Ham United. A surprising 2–2 draw at London, followed by a 2–1 victory in Giurgiu, qualified Astra for the play-off round, where they faced Dutch club AZ. A 3–2 home victory for Giurgiu was not enough to see Astra qualified to the group stage as AZ won the reverse match in Alkmaar 2–0, thus ending the club's European campaign.

In the domestic league, Astra managed to impress. Despite having a poor start which included a severe 1–5 defeat from vice-champions ASA Targu Mures, the Astralii managed to finish the regular seasons champions. During this time, however, manager Marius Șumudică was convicted of betting on domestic matches, prompting his suspension by Romanian FA for the remainder of the season. On appeal, Șumudică managed to reduce his suspension to two months, and also begin to apply at the start of the 2016–17 Liga I. On 1 May 2016, after a draw between FC Steaua and Pandurii Tg. Jiu, Astra Giurgiu won the 2015–16 Liga I. This was Șumudică's first domestic title, and also made Giurgiu the 13th Romanian city to have won a national title, after Bucharest, Timișoara, Ploiești, Arad, Craiova, Cluj-Napoca, Pitești, Oradea, Brașov, Reșița, Urziceni and Galați. Astra also later won the 2016 Supercup against CFR Cluj.

Astra qualified for the UEFA Champions League, but were quickly eliminated by Danish side Copenhagen. Astra reached the play-off round of the 2016–17 UEFA Europa League and faced West Ham, which they also met – and defeated – one year prior. The club defeated West Ham 0–1 in London and reached the group stage of the Europa League, where they were drawn in Group E alongside Roma, Viktoria Plzeň and Austria Wien. Despite having zero points after two rounds, Astra Giurgiu managed to defeat Viktoria Plzeň and Austria Wien in away matches; this, in addition to a 0–0 draw with Roma and Austria Wien's failure against Plzeň secured Astra's place in the tournament's round of 32, where they faced Genk. A 2–2 draw at Giurgiu followed by a defeat, 0–1 in Belgium ended Astra Giurgiu's best European campaign in history.

In the league, Astra had a very disappointing campaign, struggling for the majority of the regular season in the second half of the table. However, a fantastic streak of 8 consecutive wins allowed the Giurgiu club to finish 3rd in the regular season, and to qualify for the play-offs of 2016–17 Liga 1. The good form didn't last however, as they managed to gather just 5 points in the play-offs and eventually finished 6th. On 27 May, Astra lost the Romanian Cup Final against FC Voluntari after a penalty shootout, however because FC Voluntari didn't apply early enough for a European License to participate in the 2017–18 Europa League, the vacant spot was given to Astra, thus qualifying yet again in Europe.

=== Last years in the top division and downfall (2017–2022) ===
In the summer of 2017, head coach Șumudică left Astra Giurgiu after his contract expired and was replaced by Edward Iordănescu, and also the first-team squad was almost entirely changed. The team budget was strictly decreased, and Astra's new squad was the second youngest in the league. In the first match of the season, Astra won 3–1 against Azerbaijani team Zira FK with more than half of the team being debutants. After a 0–0 draw in Baku, they qualified for the Europa League 3rd qualifying round. They faced Ukrainian club FC Oleksandriya, and after an uneventful 0–0 draw at Giurgiu, Astra were beaten 1–0 in Ukraine in the last match ever played in an international competition. Despite a solid campaign, after a surprise elimination from the quarter-finals of the Romanian Cup and public criticism from the owner for the boring style of play, Edi Iordanescu resigned from the job with 8 games left.

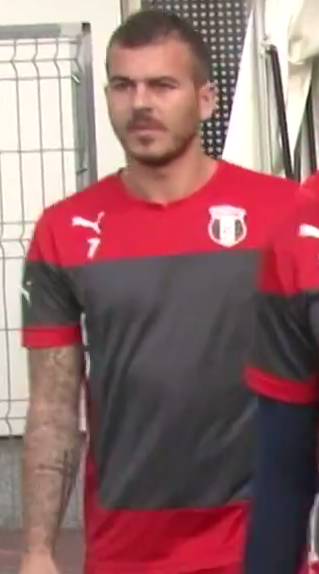
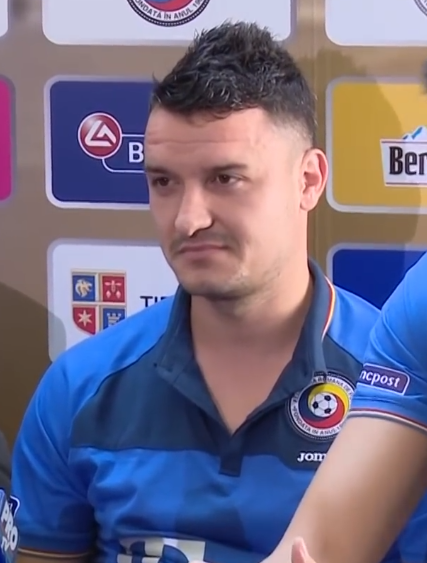
Denis Alibec and Constantin Budescu won Romanian Footballer of the Year awards while at Astra.

Although the team started the 2018–19 season very well with a surprising 1–0 win over the vice-champions FCSB. A few days later, owner Ioan Niculae announced that Astra Giurgiu managed to buy back their former star attacker, Denis Alibec, for 1 million euros, from FCSB, where he was excluded from the team after a fallout. After many financial problems, the players protested in the media, openly criticizing the owner Ioan Niculae for not paying their wages, and boycotted training. Right-back Claudiu Belu even had his contract terminated after he complained about the money issue in a post-match conference. Many first-team starters filed a memorandum. The last few months of the season were nightmarish, losing eight out of ten games in the play-off, managing to beat only Sepsi OSK. Astra Giurgiu had a very easy road to the final of the Romanian Cup, playing only second division teams or teams who were not interested in the competition, using their B-side. After breezing past CS Luceafărul Oradea, FC Universitatea Cluj, FC Dunărea Călărași, and CFR Cluj, Astra faced FC Viitorul Constanța in the final. Alibec opened the score from a free-kick right before half-time against the run of play. Viitorul dominated the game, and Astra was forced to defend with all its resources and hoped to clinch the victory. However, in the 72nd minute, a series of unfortunate events started. Alibec was injured and substituted. Five minutes later, Viitorul equalized from a corner, and another five minutes later, Romário Pires was sent off for a second yellow. In extra time, Astra changed the system to five defenders but still conceded a goal and lost their second final in the last three years, losing the chance to play in the Europa League next season.

In the summer of 2019, Dan Alexa was named as the new coach. A notable transfer was the return of former playmaker Constantin Budescu. Throughout the season, a lot of former players returned to the club. Former title winners Gabriel Enache, Alexandru Dandea, Alexandru Ioniță and Takayuki Seto returned to the team alongside former goal-scorer Kehinde Fatai. Despite the quality of his squad, Alexa spent a short time as Astra Giurgiu manager. He managed four wins, four draws and four losses.

Bogdan Andone, Sumudica's former assistant from the 2016 title winning squad, was put in charge of the team in October 2019. He won his first ten league games in charge, gaining primarily 1–0 wins. Before the winter break, the team got in the first place of the league for the first time in the last four years and had aspirations for a new title. However the present financial problems took a toll on the team. Astra was even docked three points, and failed to win any of their last four games of the regular season, nearly failing to qualify for the play-offs, after a draw against Sepsi OSK in which they scored 2 goals in one minute. Qualified in the play-off for the 5th season in a row (a record held only by them and FCSB). But, during the COVID-19 quarantine, for financial reasons, Astra Giurgiu failed to gain the European license, meaning that they couldn't play in the Europa League next season. The team finished first in Liga 1. Although the team was heavily held back by its financial problems, Astra managed to finish third place and losing one game at home all season.

As a result of the club's worsening financial difficulties, Astra's focus shifted from progressing to European competitions to simply remaining in the top league for the new season. The pandemic worsened Astra's already poor financial situation, leading to them falling behind on player wages. The club was also at risk of relegation due to doping charges, with three of their key players, Ioniță, Seto, and Fatai, being investigated for using illegal methods of vitaminization. As a consequence, the three players were suspended.

Furthermore, in February 2021, the club owner, Ioan Niculae, was sentenced to five years in prison for money laundering. At the end of the 2020–21 Liga I season, Astra Giurgiu was left without its key players and was struggling due to financial pressures. This resulted in their relegation to the second division of Romanian football after 12 years. Despite reaching the 2021 Cupa României final, they lost 3–2 to Universitatea Craiova in extra time.

Astra Giurgiu submitted a request to withdraw from Liga III on 18 October 2022, the club folding after 101 years of existence.

== Crest and colours ==
=== Emblem ===
The teams last crest was adopted in July 2009, following the team's promotion from Liga II. The design was based on a classical template, and was characterized by the same black and white stripes which could be found on the team's shirts. The numerous stars which adorn the crest have their origin in the club's name, with Astra (like Steaua) being a Romanian word which translates as "The Star".

=== Kit ===
Astra Giurgiu's primary colors were white and black, although the kit design also included red on many occasions, especially on away outfits.

== Grounds ==
Astra played its home matches in Giurgiu at the Marin Anastasovici Stadium, which had a current capacity of approximately 8,500 spectators. With the club having moved here since September 2012, the former Astra Stadium in Ploiești now acts as a training ground.

== Support ==
=== Rivalries ===
After Astra's first promotion to the Divizia A in the summer of 1998, its fans engaged in a grudge with their cross-town rivals Petrolul Ploiești. Often, the matches between Astra and Petrolul ended with clashes between the supporters. Most Astra fans considered Petrolul as their main rivals, however Lupii galbeni regard Rapid București as their principal arch-enemies. The rivalry was kept despite Astra's move to Giurgiu, and the match was sometimes referred to as Fostul derbi al Ploieștiului (Former Ploiești derby).

== Honours ==
=== Domestic ===
==== Leagues ====
- Liga I
  - Winners (1): 2015–16
  - Runners-up (1): 2013–14
- Liga II
  - Winners (1): 1997–98
  - Runners-up (1): 2008–09
- Liga III
  - Winners (1): 2007–08

==== Cups ====
- Cupa României
  - Winners (1): 2013–14
  - Runners-up (3): 2016–17, 2018–19, 2020–21
- Supercupa României
  - Winners (2): 2014, 2016

=== Astra II Ploiești ===
- Liga a IV-a – județul Prahova
  - Winners (1): 2013–14
- Cupa României – județul Prahova
  - Winners (1): 2013–14

Seasons in Liga a III-a: 8
Best place in Liga a III-a: 4th (2017–18)
Best performance in Cupa Romaniei: Round 1 (2014–15, 2015–16)

== European competition notable wins ==
Season	Match	Score
UEFA Europa League
2014–15	Astra – (Czech Republic) Slovan Liberec	3 – 0
2014–15	Astra – (France) Olympique Lyon	2 – 1
2014–15	Astra – (Croatia) Dinamo Zagreb	1 – 0
2015–16	Astra – (Scotland) Inverness	1 – 0
2015–16	Astra – (England) West Ham United	2 – 1
2015–16	Astra – (Netherlands) AZ Alkmaar	3 – 2
2016–17	Astra – (England) West Ham United	1 – 0
2016–17	Astra – (Czech Republic) Viktoria Plzeň	2 – 1
2016–17	Astra – Austria Wien	2 – 1

== Rankings ==
This was the UEFA club's coefficient as of August 2020:

Pos.	Team	Points
129	(Portugal) Arouca	9,889
130	(Portugal) Belenenses	9,889
131	(Romania) Astra	9,500
132	(Russia) Arsenal Tula	9,109
133	(Russia) Ufa	9,109

== Shirt sponsors and manufacturers ==
Period	Kit manufacturer	Period	Shirt partner
2009–2012	(Germany) Adidas	2009–2012	(Romania) InterAgro
2012–2016	(Germany) Puma	2012–2016	(Romania) InterAgro
2016–2022	(Spain) Joma	2016–2017	(Romania) Tinmar
2016–2022	(Spain) Joma	2017	(Romania) Maurer Imobiliare
2016–2022	(Spain) Joma	2018–2022	(Romania) Tinmar, Pambac

== League and cup history ==
Season	Tier	Division	Place	Notes	Cupa României	Supercupa României
2022–23	3	Liga III (Series IV)	10th	Withdrew and dissolved	Second round	—
2021–22	2	Liga II	20th	Relegated	Round of 32	—
2020–21	1	Liga I	15th	Relegated	Runner-up	—
2019–20	1	Liga I	3rd		Round of 16	—
2018–19	1	Liga I	5th		Runner-up	—
2017–18	1	Liga I	5th		Quarter-finals	—
2016–17	1	Liga I	6th	Qualified for the UEFA Europa League	Runner-up	—
2015–16	1	Liga I	1st (C)	Qualified for the UEFA Champions League	Quarter-finals	Winner
2014–15	1	Liga I	4th	Qualified for the UEFA Europa League	Round of 32	—
2013–14	1	Liga I	2nd	Qualified for the UEFA Europa League	Winner	Winner
2012–13	1	Liga I	4th	Moved to Giurgiu; qualified for the UEFA Europa League	Semi-finals	—
2011–12	1	Liga I	12th		Round of 16	—
2010–11	1	Liga I	11th		Round of 16	—
2009–10	1	Liga I	14th	Renamed Astra Ploiești	Quarter-finals	—
2008–09	2	Liga II (Series I)	2nd	Promoted as FC Ploiești	Round of 32	—
2007–08	3	Liga III (Series III)	1st (C)	Promoted as CSM FC Ploiești	Fourth round	—
2006–07	3	Liga III (Series III)	5th		Third round	—
2005–06	2	Divizia B (Series II)	10th	Refounded as CSM Ploiești; relegated	Fifth round	—
2004–05	—	—	—	Did not compete	—	—
2003–04	—	—	—	Did not compete following the merger with Petrolul Ploiești	—	—
2002–03	1	Divizia A	9th	Merged with Petrolul Ploiești after the season	Semi-finals	—
2001–02	1	Divizia A	12th		Semi-finals	—
2000–01	1	Divizia A	10th		Round of 32	—
1999–00	1	Divizia A	10th		Round of 16	—
1998–99	1	Divizia A	10th		Round of 32	—
1997–98	2	Divizia B (Series I)	1st (C)	Renamed Astra Ploiești; promoted		—
1996–97	2	Divizia B (Series I)	8th	Played as AS Danubiana Ploiești	Round of 32	—
1995–96	3	Divizia C (Series III)	14th	Merged with Danubiana București		—
1994–95	3	Divizia C (Series III)	3rd			—
1993–94	3	Divizia C (Series III)	12th			—
1992–93	3	Divizia C (Series III)	6th	First season in the national leagues		—

Season	League	Pos.	M	W	D	L	GS	GA	Pts.	Notes
Before 1992	Data unavailable									
1992–93	Liga III	6	38	19	4	15	57	51	42	
1993–94	Liga III	12	36	14	6	16	40	47	34	
1994–95	Liga III	3	36	21	3	12	68	35	66	
1995–96	Liga III	14	36	15	3	18	51	52	48	Merged with Danubiana București, who won the promotion to the 2nd league.
1996–97	Liga II	8	34	14	9	11	42	31	51	Played under the name of AS Danubiana Ploiești.
1997–98	Liga II	1	34	28	4	2	80	20	88	Changed its name back to Astra Ploiești.
1998–99	Liga I	10	34	13	7	14	40	38	46	
1999–00	Liga I	10	34	13	8	13	43	41	47	
2000–01	Liga I	10	30	11	7	12	41	36	40	
2001–02	Liga I	12	30	9	10	11	29	28	37	
2002–03	Liga I	9	30	13	3	14	42	42	42	Changed its name to Petrolul Ploiești.
2005–06	Liga II	10	30	12	4	14	45	50	40	Refounded as Astra Ploiești.
2006–07	Liga III	5	32	15	7	10	48	40	52	
2007–08	Liga III	1	34	31	2	1	83	18	95	Renamed and promoted under the name of CSM FC Ploiești.
2008–09	Liga II	2	30	21	4	5	62	32	67	Promoted under the name of FC Ploiești.
2009–10	Liga I	14	34	8	12	14	33	45	36	Changed its name back to Astra Ploiești.
2010–11	Liga I	11	34	10	15	9	36	30	45	
2011–12	Liga I	12	34	11	8	15	36	43	41	
2012–13	Liga I	4	34	17	9	8	64	37	60	Moved from Ploiești to Giurgiu and was renamed Astra Giurgiu, Qualified for the 2013–14 UEFA Europa League
2013–14	Liga I	2	34	22	6	6	70	28	72	Qualified for the 2014–15 UEFA Europa League
2014–15	Liga I	4	34	15	12	7	53	27	57	Qualified for the 2015–16 UEFA Europa League
2015–16	Liga I	1	36	21	10	5	62	38	73	Qualified for the 2016–17 UEFA Champions League
2016–17	Liga I	6	36	14	7	15	42	45	49	Qualified for the 2017–18 UEFA Europa League
2017–18	Liga I	5	36	16	7	13	41	39	55	
2018–19	Liga I	5	36	13	9	14	42	43	48	
2019–20	Liga I	3	34	16	9	9	50	37	57	
2020–21	Liga I	15	39	10	13	16	44	51	43	Relegated to Liga II
2021–22	Liga II	20	25	5	4	16	23	53	-1	Relegated to Liga III
2022–23	Liga III (Seria IV)	10								Dissolved

Champion	Runner-up	Promoted	Relegated

=== League Cup history ===
Season	Opponent	1st Leg	2nd Leg	Cup Round
Before 2014	The competition had a friendly character			
2014–15	Steaua București	0–3	2–0	Semi-finals
2015–16	Steaua București	0–1	0–2	Semi-finals
2016–17	Dinamo București	2–5 (a.e.t.)		Quarter-finals

=== European Cups history ===
Season	Competition	Round	Club	Home	Away	Aggregate
2013–14	UEFA Europa League	1Q	(Slovenia) Domžale	2–0	1–0	3–0
2013–14	UEFA Europa League	2Q	(Cyprus) Omonia	1–1	2–1	3–2
2013–14	UEFA Europa League	3Q	(Slovakia) AS Trenčín	2–2	3–1	5–3
2013–14	UEFA Europa League	PO	(Israel) Maccabi Haifa	1–1	0–2	1–3
2014–15	UEFA Europa League	3Q	(Czech Republic) Slovan Liberec	3–0	3–2	6–2
2014–15	UEFA Europa League	PO	(France) Lyon	0–1	2–1	2–2 (a)
2014–15	UEFA Europa League	Group D	(Austria) Red Bull Salzburg	1–2	1–5	4th
2014–15	UEFA Europa League	Group D	(Scotland) Celtic	1–1	1–2	4th
2014–15	UEFA Europa League	Group D	(Croatia) Dinamo Zagreb	1–0	1–5	4th
2015–16	UEFA Europa League	2Q	(Scotland) Inverness CT	0–0	1–0	1–0
2015–16	UEFA Europa League	3Q	(England) West Ham United	2–1	2–2	4–3
2015–16	UEFA Europa League	PO	(Netherlands) AZ	3–2	0–2	3–4
2016–17	UEFA Champions League	3Q	(Denmark) Copenhagen	1–1	0–3	1–4
2016–17	UEFA Europa League	PO	(England) West Ham United	1–1	1–0	2–1
2016–17	UEFA Europa League	Group E	(Czech Republic) Viktoria Plzeň	1–1	2–1	2nd
2016–17	UEFA Europa League	Group E	(Italy) Roma	0–0	0–4	2nd
2016–17	UEFA Europa League	Group E	Austria Wien	2–3	2–1	2nd
2016–17	UEFA Europa League	R32	(Belgium) Genk	2–2	0–1	2–3
2017–18	UEFA Europa League	2Q	(Azerbaijan) Zira	3–1	0–0	3–1
2017–18	UEFA Europa League	3Q	(Ukraine) Oleksandriya	0–0	0–1	0–1

Notes for abbreviations in the above table:

- 1Q: First qualifying round
- 2Q: Second qualifying round
- 3Q: Third qualifying round
- PO: Play-off round

=== European cups all-time statistics ===
As of 9 March 2018

Competition	S	P	W	D	L	GF	GA	GD
UEFA Champions League	1	2	0	1	1	1	4	−3
UEFA Europa League	5	38	15	12	11	48	50	−2
Total	6	40	15	13	12	49	54	−5

== Notable former players ==
The footballers enlisted below have had international cap(s) for their respective countries at junior and/or senior level and/or more than 100 caps for FC Astra Giurgiu.

- (Romania) Marius Alexe
- (Romania) Ștefan Bărboianu
- (Romania) Dănuț Coman
- (Romania) Mihai Dăscălescu
- (Romania) Florentin Dumitru
- (Romania) Gabriel Enache
- (Romania) Marius Lățescu
- (Romania) Valerică Găman
- (Romania) Liviu Ganea
- (Romania) Lucian Goian
- (Romania) Róbert Ilyés
- (Romania) Dan Lăcustă
- (Romania) Florin Lovin
- (Romania) Andrei Mureșan
- (Romania) Bogdan Nicolae
- (Romania) Cristian Oroș
- (Romania) Ion Sburlea
- (Romania) Pompiliu Stoica
- (Romania) Sorin Strătilă
- (Romania) Costel Lazăr
- (Romania) Silviu Lung Jr.
- (Romania) Alexandru Mățel
- (Romania) Ovidiu Mihalache
- (Romania) Cătălin Mulțescu
- (Romania) Daniel Niculae
- (Romania) Daniel Petroesc
- (Romania) Gheorghe Rohat
- (Romania) Cristian Săpunaru
- (Romania) Alexandru Stan
- (Romania) Alexandru Ioniță
- (Romania) Denis Alibec
- (Romania) Constantin Budescu

Brazil

- (Brazil) Fernando Boldrin
- (Brazil) William De Amorim
- (Brazil) Júnior Morais

Bosnia and Herzegovina

- (Bosnia and Herzegovina) Daniel Graovac

Bulgaria

- (Bulgaria) Plamen Iliev

Croatia

- (Croatia) Filip Mrzljak

Cyprus

- (Cyprus) Vincent Laban

France

- (France) Mike Cestor
- (France) Anthony Le Tallec
- (France) Karim Yoda

Ghana

- (Ghana) Seidu Yahaya
- (Ghana) Sadat Bukari

Japan

- (Japan) Takayuki Seto

Macedonia

- (North Macedonia) Mirko Ivanovski

Nigeria

- (Nigeria) Kehinde Fatai

Portugal

- (Portugal) Geraldo Alves
- (Portugal) Filipe Teixeira

Senegal

- (Senegal) Ousmane N'Doye

Tunisia

- (Tunisia) Syam Ben Youssef

Zambia

- (Zambia) Fwayo Tembo

== Notable former managers ==
- (Romania) Valentin Sinescu (2012–2013)
- (Romania) Marius Șumudică
- (Romania) Daniel Isăilă
- (Romania) Costel Enache
