= 2014 Supercupa României =

- Event: 2014 Supercupa României
Steaua București	Astra Giurgiu
Liga I	Cupa României
1	1
- Astra Giurgiu won 5–3 on penalties.
- Date: 11 July 2014
- Venue: Arena Națională, Bucharest
- Referee: Alexandru Tudor
- Attendance: 10.000
- Weather: Clear

The 2014 Supercupa României was the 16th edition of Romania's season opener cup competition. The game was contested between Liga I title holders, Steaua București, and Romanian Cup winners, Astra Giurgiu. It was played at Arena Națională in Bucharest in July. Astra won the trophy for the first time in history, after defeating Steaua Bucharest, the defending champions, 5–3 on penalties.

== Match ==
=== Details ===
11 July 2014 Final	Steaua București	1–1 (a.e.t.) (3–5 p)	Astra Giurgiu	Arena Națională, Bucharest
21:00 EET (UTC+02)	Chipciu 45'	Report; Report	Enache 74'	Attendance: 10,000; Referee: Alexandru Tudor; Assistant referees: Mircea Grigoriu, Alexandru Cerei; Fourth official: Daniel Mitruți; Goal-line assistants: Robert Dumitru, Marcel Bîrsan
	Penalties
	Keșerü (penalty scored); Filip (penalty missed); Pârvulescu (penalty scored); Latovlevici (penalty scored)		Găman (penalty scored); Seto (penalty scored); Morais (penalty scored); Laban (penalty scored); Budescu (penalty scored)

Steaua București	Astra Giurgiu

GK	24	(Lithuania) Giedrius Arlauskis
DF	2	(Romania) Cornel Râpă	(yellow card) 87'
DF	4	(Poland) Lukasz Szukala	(yellow card) 23'
DF	9	(Cape Verde) Fernando Varela
DF	14	(Romania) Iasmin Latovlevici
MF	11	(Romania) Andrei Prepeliță	(yellow card) 26'
MF	8	(Romania) Lucian Filip
MF	7	(Romania) Alexandru Chipciu	(yellow card) 69'
MF	12	(Romania) Nicolae Stanciu		(substituted off) 78'
MF	10	(Romania) Cristian Tănase (c)
FW	9	(Romania) Gabriel Iancu		(substituted off) 73'
Substitutes:
DF	13	(Romania) Alin Toșca
DF	22	(Romania) Paul Pârvulescu		(substituted on) 78'
MF	26	(Romania) Ionuț Neagu
MF	27	(Romania) Răzvan Grădinaru
FW	28	(Romania) Claudiu Keșerü	(yellow card) pen'	(substituted on) 73'
GK	95	(Romania) Valentin Cojocaru
FW	97	(Romania) Robert Vâlceanu
Manager:
(Romania) Constantin Gâlcă

GK	1	(Romania) Silviu Lung Jr.
DF	6	(Ghana) Seidu Yahaya
DF	25	(Romania) Valerică Găman
DF	5	(Tunisia) Syam Ben Youssef	(yellow card) 62'
DF	13	(Brazil) Júnior Morais	(yellow card) 69'
MF	14	(France) Vincent Laban	(yellow card) 80'
MF	8	(Japan) Takayuki Seto	(yellow card) 113'
MF	9	(Romania) Gabriel Enache
MF	18	(Romania) Marian Cristescu		(substituted off) 46'
MF	10	(Romania) Constantin Budescu (c)
FW	19	(Ghana) Sadat Bukari		(substituted off) 46'
Substitutes:
MF	11	(Romania) Alexandru Ioniță
FW	21	(Nigeria) Kehinde Fatai		(substituted on) 46'
DF	22	(Romania) Cristian Oroş
GK	33	(Romania) Dănuț Coman
MF	91	(Brazil) William De Amorim		(substituted on) 46'
Manager:
(Romania) Daniel Isăilă

MAN OF THE MATCH

- (Romania) Silviu Lung Jr.

MATCH OFFICIALS

- Assistant referees:
  - (Romania) Mircea Grigoriu
  - (Romania) Alexandru Cerei
- Fourth official:
  - (Romania) Daniel Mitruți
- Additional assistant referees:
  - (Romania) Marcel Bîrsan
  - (Romania) Robert Dumitru

MATCH RULES

- 90 minutes.
- 30 minutes of extra-time if necessary.
- Penalty shoot-out if scores still level.
- Seven named substitutes.
- Maximum of three substitutions.

== See also ==
- 2014–15 Liga I
- 2014–15 Cupa României
