= Sadat Bukari =

Ghanaian footballer (born 1989)

Personal information
- Date of birth: 12 April 1989 (age 37)
- Place of birth: Wa, Ghana
- Height: 1.75 m (5 ft 9 in)
- Position: Forward

Youth career
- 2003–2005: Heart of Lions
- 2006: West Ham United

Senior career*
Years	Team	Apps	(Gls)
2006–2007	Heart of Lions		
2007–2009	Étoile du Sahel		
2010–2011	Maccabi Haifa	11	(0)
2010–2011	→ Hapoël Ashkelon (loan)	0	(0)
2012	US Monastir	10	(2)
2012–2015	Astra Giurgiu	46	(14)
2015–2016	Al-Shoulla	10	(3)
2016	Aris Limassol F.C.	21	(11)
2016–2018	Al-Shoulla	40	(27)
2018–2019	Churchill Brothers	0	(0)
- * Club domestic league appearances and goals

Sadat Bukari (born 12 April 1989) is a Ghanaian former professional footballer who played as a forward.

== Club career ==
Bukari's transfer from Ghanaian team Heart of Lions to Tunisian team Étoile du Sahel. With Sahel, he won the 2008 CAF Confederation Cup. In the summer of 2012 he signed with the Romanian club Astra Giurgiu. He last played for Churchill Brothers in the I-League.

== International career ==
Bukari represented Ghana at the 2005 FIFA U-17 World Championship in Peru, appearing in two matches.

== Honours ==
Étoile du Sahel

- CAF Super Cup: 2008
- CAF Confederation Cup: 2008
- 2007–08 Tunisian Ligue Professionnelle 1
- Tunisian Cup runner-up: 2007–08

Maccabi Haifa

- Israeli Premier League:2009–10

Astra Giurgiu

- Cupa României: 2013–14
- Supercupa României: 2014
