= 2013–14 Cupa României =

Cupa României Timișoreana 2013–14

Tournament details
- Country: Romania
- Teams: 164

Final positions
- Champions: Astra Giurgiu
- Runners-up: Steaua București

The 2013–14 Cupa României was the seventy-sixth season of the annual Romanian football knockout tournament. The winner of the competition qualifies for the third qualifying round of the 2014–15 UEFA Europa League, if they have not already qualified for European competition; if so then the first non-European place of the 2013–14 Liga I qualifies for the second qualifying round of the 2014–15 UEFA Europa League.

== Round of 32 ==
The round of 32 ties will be played between 24 and 26 September. The winners of the Fifth round was joined by Liga I teams. All times are EEST (UTC+3).

24 September 2013	FC Vaslui (I)	1–0	Metalul Reșița (II)
16:00	Pătulea 53'

24 September 2013	Chindia Târgoviște (III)	2–0	Săgeata Năvodari (I)
16:00	Honciu 63'; Cherchez 73'

24 September 2013	Corona Brașov (I)	1–0	SC Bacău (II)
16:00	Aguirre 21'

24 September 2013	FCM Dorohoi (III)	0–3	Viitorul Constanța (I)
16:00			Axente 7'; Lazăr 15'; Gavra 85'

24 September 2013	Bihor Oradea (II)	0–1	Poli Timișoara (I)
16:00			Bărbuț 74'

24 September 2013	Ripensia Timișoara (V)	2–1	Universitatea Cluj (I)
18:30	Ciobai 13'; Anagor 21'		Ursu 39'

24 September 2013	Dinamo București (I)	4–0	Sănătatea Cluj (IV)
20:30	Zougoula 41', 48'; Dănciulescu 52'; Rotariu 63'

25 September 2013	Gloria Buzău (II)	0–2 (a.e.t.)	FC Botoșani (I)
16:00			Cârjan 104'; Vraciu 109'

25 September 2013	Petrolistul Kaproni Boldești (IV)	0–4	Gaz Metan Mediaș (I)
16:00			Llullaku 40' (pen.), 90+2'; Marković 48'; Avram 66'

25 September 2013	Pandurii Târgu Jiu (I)	4–0	Farul Constanța (II)
16:00	Alex 3'; Shamsin 28', 70', 74'

25 September 2013	FC Brașov (I)	3–1	CFR Cluj (I)
18:30	Aganović 13'; Rada 17' (o.g.); Surdu 90' (pen.)		Piccolo 55' (pen.)

25 September 2013	FC U Craiova (II)	0–1	Petrolul Ploiești (I)
20:30			Mustivar 18'

26 September 2013	Oțelul Galați (I)	6–2	Concordia Chiajna (I)
16:00	Filip 5'; Sârghi 44'; Melinte 47' (o.g.); Marquinhos 55', 77'; Astafei 62'		Wellington 50'; Serediuc 82'

26 September 2013	Astra Giurgiu (I)	4–1	ACS Berceni (II)
16:00	Bukari 14'; Budescu 31', 90+4'; Cristescu 83'		Stan 33'

26 September 2013	Rapid București (II)	3–1	Ceahlăul Piatra Neamț (I)
18:30	Martin 14'; Ciolacu 24'; Doman 35'		Dică 70'

26 September 2013	Steaua București (I)	4–0	Avântul Bârsana (IV)
20:30	Răduț 19', 69'; Kapetanos 63', 90'

== Round of 16 ==
All times are EET (UTC+2).

29 October 2013	Ripensia Timișoara (V)	0–3	Pandurii Târgu Jiu (I)	Dan Păltinișanu
16:00			Erico 9'; Adrović 29'; Ciobai 63' (o.g.)	Referee: Florin Marcu

29 October 2013	FC Vaslui (I)	4–1	FC Botoșani (I)	Municipal
18:30	Temwanjera 17', 56'; Madson 23'; Antal 81'		Vraciu 7'	Referee: Cătălin Popa

29 October 2013	Gaz Metan Mediaș (I)	0–1	Astra Giurgiu (I)	Gaz Metan
20:30			Morais 86'	Referee: Nicolae Botaș

30 October 2013	FC Brașov (I)	0–1	Viitorul Constanța (I)	Tineretului
18:00			Gavra 11'	Referee: Kovacs Istvan

30 October 2013	Steaua București (I)	2–0	Poli Timișoara (I)	Steaua
20:00	Georgievski 11'; Piovaccari 74'			Referee: George Cătălin Găman

31 October 2013	Oțelul Galați (I)	2–1	Corona Brașov (I)	Oțelul
16:30	Bernardo 6', 60'		Antunes 26' (o.g.)	Referee: Paul Unimatan

31 October 2013	Dinamo București (I)	5–0	Chindia Târgovişte (III)	Dinamo
18:30	Thomas 8', 63'; Durimel 41', 86'; Lazăr 63'			Referee: Marian Balaci

31 October 2013	Rapid București (II)	0–2	Petrolul Ploiești (I)	Giulești-Valentin Stănescu
20:30			Doré 66'; Romário 72'	Referee: Iulian Călin

== Quarter-finals ==
All times are EET (UTC+2).

3 December 2013	Viitorul Constanța	0–3	Astra Giurgiu	Stadionul Concordia
20:30			Budescu 30'; Cristescu 34'; Yoda 88'	Attendance: 500; Referee: Iulian Dima

4 December 2013	Petrolul Ploiești	4–2 (a.e.t.)	FC Vaslui	Stadionul Ilie Oană
19:00	Fernández 37'; Hoban 90+3'; Alves 99'; Romário 103'		Celeban 27', 70'	Attendance: 15,000; Referee: Cristian Balaj

4 December 2013	Dinamo București	1–0	Pandurii Tg. Jiu	Dinamo
21:30	Grigore 58' (pen.)			Attendance: 1,000; Referee: Alexandru Tudor

5 December 2013	Steaua București	2–0	Oțelul Galați	Steaua
20:30	Piovaccari 46'; Târnovan 84'			Attendance: 2,000; Referee: Matius Avram

== Semi-finals ==
=== 1st leg ===
26 March 2014	Petrolul Ploiești	0–0	Astra Giurgiu	Ploiești
20:30		Report (Romanian)		Stadium: Ilie Oană; Attendance: 10,500; Referee: Cristian Balaj

27 March 2014	Steaua București	5–2	Dinamo București	București
20:30	Latovlevici 22'; Varela 39'; Chipciu 43'; Tănase 45+2'; Keserü 78'		Rotariu 32'; Lazăr 53'	Stadium: National Arena; Attendance: 45,500; Referee: Haţegan Ovidiu

=== 2nd leg ===
16 April 2014	Astra Giurgiu	2–1 (2–1 agg.)	Petrolul Ploiești	Giurgiu
20:30	Budescu 52'; Papp 90+4'		Tamuz 22'	Stadium: Marin Anastasovici

17 April 2014	Dinamo București	1–1 (3–6 agg.)	Steaua București	București
20:30	Matei 86'		Tănase 22'	Stadium: Stadionul Dinamo

== Final ==
23 May 2014	Steaua București	0–0 (a.e.t.) (2–4 p)	Astra Giurgiu	București
21:00 EEST		Report		Stadium: Arena Națională; Attendance: 48,201; Referee: Ovidiu Haţegan
	Penalties
	Keșerü (penalty scored); Varela (penalty missed); Pintilii (penalty missed); Szukała (penalty scored)		(penalty scored) Laban; (penalty scored) Júnior Morais; (penalty missed) Cristescu; (penalty scored) Budescu; (penalty scored) Yazalde
