= 2017–18 FC Petrolul Ploiești season =

Petrolul Ploiești
2017–18 season
- President: Cristian Vlad
- Coach: Romulus Ciobanu
- Stadium: Stadionul Ilie Oană
- Liga III: 1st
- Cupa României: Round of 32
- Top goalscorer: League: Sergiu Arnăutu (20); All: Sergiu Arnăutu (22)
- Highest home attendance: 10,000 vs SC Popeşti-Leordeni (26 May 2018, Liga III)
- Lowest home attendance: 2,000 vs Flacăra Moreni (22 September 2017, Liga III)
- Average home league attendance: 4,136
Home colours	Away colours

The 2017–18 season is Petrolul Ploiești's 88th season in the Romanian football league system. Petrolul came first in the 2016–17 Liga IV.
During early 2017, it was reported that the Romanian subsidiary of French company Veolia would take over the club. On 16 June 2017, with financial support from the company, ACS Petrolul 52 Ploiești leased FC Petrolul brand from the Municipality of Ploiești for €30,000 and returned to the former name of FC Petrolul Ploiești, targeting a return to the first division in the 2019–20 season.

== Players ==
=== First team squad ===
As of 10 March 2018

Note: Flags indicate national team as defined under FIFA eligibility rules; some limited exceptions apply. Players may hold more than one non-FIFA nationality.

No.	Pos.	Nation	Player
12	GK	(Romania) ROU	Mirel Bolboașă
22	GK	(Romania) ROU	Raul Avram
86	GK	(Romania) ROU	Raul Botezan
3	DF	(Romania) ROU	Jean Prunescu (3rd captain)
4	DF	(Romania) ROU	Mihai Velisar
5	DF	(Romania) ROU	Alexandru Ichim
6	DF	(Romania) ROU	Paul Antoche
15	DF	(Romania) ROU	Alberto Olaru
16	DF	(Romania) ROU	Valentin Țicu
30	DF	(Romania) ROU	Gabriel Frîncu
7	MF	(Romania) ROU	Alexandru Ciocâlteu
8	MF	(Romania) ROU	Tiberiu Nițescu

No.	Pos.	Nation	Player
10	MF	(Romania) ROU	Claudiu Tudor (vice-captain)
11	MF	(Romania) ROU	Nini Popescu
18	MF	(Romania) ROU	Cristian Andor
19	MF	(Romania) ROU	Mario Bratu
20	MF	(Romania) ROU	Răzvan Catană
29	MF	(Romania) ROU	Tudor Şaim
33	MF	(Romania) ROU	Marius Chindriș
14	FW	(Romania) ROU	Georgian Păun (captain)
17	FW	(Romania) ROU	Daniel Cârjan
26	FW	(Romania) ROU	Cosmin Lambru
28	FW	(Romania) ROU	Sergiu Arnăutu

== Current technical staff ==
Role	Name
Coach	(Romania) Romulus Ciobanu
Assistant coach	(Romania) Ciprian Pura
Goalkeeping coach	(Romania) Cătălin Grigore
Fitness coach	(Romania) Marius Haită
Medic	(Romania) Răduță Gheoca
Kinetotherapist	(Romania) Dan Gheoca
Youth goalkeeping coach	(Romania) Gheorghe Liliac

== Pre-season and friendlies ==
1 August 2017	Petrolul Ploiești (Romania)	6–1	(Romania) Colțea Brașov	Brașov, Romania
17:00 UTC+2	Șaim; Ciocâlteu; Puchea; Arnăutu; Popescu; Vintilă	Report	Lita	Stadium: Carpați

3 August 2017	Petrolul Ploiești (Romania)	5–0	(Romania) Steagu Roșu Brașov	Brașov, Romania
17:30 UTC+2	Tudor 34' (pen.); Antoche 37'; Vintilă 49'; Păun 63'; Popescu 75'	Report		Stadium: Metrom; Attendance: 100

4 August 2017	Petrolul Ploiești (Romania)	3–0	(Romania) Oțelul Galați	Brașov, Romania
11:30 UTC+2	Tudor 4' (pen.); Gheorghe 9'; Ciocâlteu 77'	Report		Stadium: Metrom; Attendance: 100

4 August 2017	Petrolul Ploiești (Romania)	2–0	(Romania) Progresul Spartac București	Strejnic, Romania
18:00 UTC+2	Velisar 12'; Arnăutu 37'	Report		Stadium: Conpet; Attendance: 400; Referee: Laurențiu Piciu

12 August 2017	Petrolul Ploiești (Romania)	2–2	(Romania) Aninoasa	Aninoasa, Romania
11:00 UTC+2	Vintilă 84' 85'		Călinescu 7'; Dinu 43'	Stadium: Comunal

18 August 2017	Petrolul Ploiești (Romania)	0–0	(Romania) Râmnicu Sărat	Râmnicu Sărat, Romania
17:30 UTC+2		Report		Stadium: Municipal

25 November 2017	Petrolul Ploiești (Romania)	2–0	(Romania) Universitatea II Craiova	Ploiești, Romania
15:00 UTC+2	Velisar 13'; Stănescu 61'	Report		Stadium: Ilie Oană; Attendance: 600; Referee: Mihai Safta

2 December 2017	Petrolul Ploiești (Romania)	3–0	(Romania) CS Blejoi	Câmpina, Romania
11:00 UTC+2	Șaim 44'; Păun 57'; Catană 73'	Report		Stadium: Poiana; Referee: Andrei Moroiţă (Ploiești)

20 January 2018	Petrolul Ploiești (Romania)	12–1	(Romania) Brașov	Ploiești, Romania
12:00 UTC+2		Report		Stadium: Ilie Oană

28 January 2018	Petrolul Ploiești (Romania)	2–1	(Romania) Olimpic Cetate Râșnov	Cheile Grădiștei, Romania
		www.mytex.ro/stiri/158-sport/fotbal/567924-inaintea-amicalului-cu-as-sr-brasov-petrolul-ploiesti-s-a-testat-cu-olimpic-cetate-rasnov-cat-a-fost-scorul.html

31 January 2018	Petrolul Ploiești (Romania)	5–0	(Romania) Brașov	Cheile Grădiștei, Romania
		Report

7 February 2018	Petrolul Ploiești (Romania)	3–2	(Romania) Unirea Slobozia	Buftea, Romania
		Report		Stadium: CNAF

10 February 2018	Petrolul Ploiești (Romania)	0–0	(Romania) Argeș Pitești	Buftea, Romania
		Report		Stadium: CNAF

14 February 2018	Petrolul Ploiești (Romania)	1–2	(Romania) Chindia Târgoviște	Buftea, Romania
		Report		Stadium: CNAF

21 February 2018	Petrolul Ploiești (Romania)	6–0	(Romania) Progresul Spartac București	Ploiești, Romania
		Report		Stadium: Ilie Oană

== Competitions ==
=== Liga III ===
==== League table ====
Pos	Team	Pld	W	D	L	GF	GA	GD	Pts	Promotion or relegation
1	Petrolul Ploiești	24	19	3	2	57	18	+39	60	Promotion to Liga II
2	FCM Alexandria	24	17	5	2	59	16	+43	56	
3	Voința Turnu Măgurele	24	17	5	2	50	15	+35	56	
4	Astra II Ploiești	24	12	6	6	33	18	+15	42	

Updated to match(es) played on 26 May 2018. Source: FRF

==== Result round by round ====
Round	1	2	3	4	5	6	7	8	9	10	11	12	13	14	15	16	17	18	19	20	21	22	23	24
Ground	H	A	H	A	H	A	H	A	H	A	H	A	A	H	A	H	A	H	A	H	A	H	A	H
Result	W	W	W	W	W	W	D	W	W	W	D	W	W	W	W	W	W	W	W	W	L	W	D	L
Position	4	3	1	1	2	2	2	3	2	1	1	1	1	1	1	1	1	1	1	1	1	1	1	1

Updated to match(es) played on 26 May 2018. Source: FRF
A = Away; H = Home; W = Win; D = Draw; L = Loss

==== Results ====
25 August 2017 1	Petrolul Ploiești	3–1	Viitorul Domneşti	Ploiești
20:00 UTC+3	Arnăutu 50'; Ciocâlteu 75'; Lambru 79'	Report	Andronache 23'	Stadium: Ilie Oană; Attendance: 4,133; Referee: Alin Constantin Olaru (Olanu)

2 September 2017 2	Sporting Roșiori	0–1	Petrolul Ploiești	Roșiorii de Vede
17:00 UTC+3		Report	Arnăutu 8' (pen.)	Stadium: Rova; Attendance: 2,500; Referee: Adrian Comănescu (Râmnicu Vâlcea)

7 September 2017 3	Petrolul Ploiești	4–0	Aninoasa	Ploiești
19:00 UTC+3	Arnăutu 16' (pen.); Puchea 37'; Prunescu 58'; Lambru 90'	Report		Stadium: Ilie Oană; Attendance: 2,306; Referee: Marius Naidin (Pitești)

15 September 2017 4	CS Tunari	0–1	Petrolul Ploiești	Buftea
17:00 UTC+3		Report	Arnăutu 45' (pen.)	Stadium: CNAF; Attendance: 1,500; Referee: Cătălin Popa (Pitești)

22 September 2017 5	Petrolul Ploiești	3–2	Flacăra Moreni	Ploiești
18:00 UTC+3	Velisar 78'; Saim 86'; Arnăutu 90+2'	Report	Plăcintă 33'; Timofte 90+4'	Stadium: Ilie Oană; Attendance: 2,000; Referee: Valentin Porumbel (Oltenița)

29 September 2017 6	Concordia II Chiajna	0–2	Petrolul Ploiești	Chiajna
17:00 UTC+3		Report	Arnăutu pen' (45); Gheorghe 85'	Stadium: Concordia; Attendance: 300; Referee: Bogdan Ionuţ Anghelinei (Galați)

13 October 2017 7	Petrolul Ploiești	1–1	FCM Alexandria	Ploiești
18:15 UTC+3	Prunescu 41'	Report	Căpățână 31'	Stadium: Ilie Oană; Attendance: 6,000; Referee: Florin Andrei (Târgu Mureș)

21 October 2017 8	Voința Turnu Măgurele	0–1	Petrolul Ploiești	Saelele
15:00 UTC+3		Report	Arnăutu 13'	Stadium: Comunal; Attendance: 2,500; Referee: Cătălin Buși (Rm. Vâlcea)

27 October 2017 9	Petrolul Ploiești	4–2	Atletic Bradu	Ploiești
18:45 UTC+3	Arnăutu 1' 29'; Ciocâlteu 18'; Tudor pen' (23)	Report	Preda 24'; Golban 83'	Stadium: Ilie Oană; Attendance: 2,200; Referee: Cristian Moldoveanu (Sfântu Gheorghe)

3 November 2017 10	Mioveni II	0–3	Petrolul Ploiești	Mioveni
14:00 UTC+2		Report	Arnăutu 27'; Popescu 55' 60'	Stadium: Orășenesc; Attendance: 800; Referee: Ionuţ Constantinescu (Galați)

11 November 2017 11	Petrolul Ploiești	0–0	Astra II Ploiești	Ploiești
19:15 UTC+2		Report		Stadium: Ilie Oană; Attendance: 3,000; Referee: Eduard Dumitrescu (Piteşti)

18 November 2017 12	SC Popeşti-Leordeni	1–2	Petrolul Ploiești	Popești-Leordeni
14:00 UTC+2	Anghelini 61'	Report	Antoche 15'; Ciocâlteu 79'	Stadium: Inter Gaz; Attendance: 400; Referee: Camelia Nicolae (Bucharest)

3 March 2018 13	Viitorul Domneşti	0–3	Petrolul Ploiești	Domnești
				Stadium: Stadionul Voinţa

11 March 2018 14	Petrolul Ploiești	1–0	Sporting Roșiori	Ploiești
14:00 UTC+2	Prunescu 50'			Stadium: Ilie Oană; Attendance: 5,500; Referee: Szabolcs Kovács (Carei)

17 March 2018 15	Aninoasa	1–7	Petrolul Ploiești	Aninoasa
15:00 UTC+2	Codroiu 57'	Report	Velisar 2'; Ciocâlteu 32'; Arnăutu 36', 51', 71' (pen.); Lambru 75', 88'	Stadium: Comunal; Attendance: 800; Referee: Bogdan Anghelinei (Galați)

30 March 2018 17	Flacăra Moreni	0–2	Petrolul Ploiești	Moreni
15:00 UTC+2		Report	Arnăutu 18'; Păun 20'	Stadium: Stadionul Flacăra; Referee: Dragoş Istrate (Bucharest)

3 April 2018 16	Petrolul Ploiești	1–0	CS Tunari	Ploiești
19:00 UTC+2	Păun 65' (pen.)	Report		Stadium: Ilie Oană; Attendance: 2,000; Referee: Dorin Burloiu (Galaţi)
Note: Round postponed from 24 March due to snowing conditions in Romania.

6 April 2018 18	Petrolul Ploiești	4–0	Concordia II Chiajna	Ploiești
16:00 UTC+2	Popescu 13' (41), pen' Ciocâlteu 53'; Arnăutu 77'	Report		Stadium: Ilie Oană; Attendance: 4,000; Referee: Adrian Sorin Costreie (Buftea)

20 April 2018 19	FCM Alexandria	1–4	Petrolul Ploiești	Alexandria
17:00 UTC+2	Ichim 69' (o.g.)	Report	Arnăutu 18' (23), 40'; Şaim 34'	Stadium: Stadionul Municipal; Attendance: 2,000; Referee: Paul Unimatan (Zalău)

27 April 20	Petrolul Ploiești	1–3	Voința Turnu Măgurele	Ploiești
18:00 UTC+2	Păun 2'	Report	Fotescu 44'; Antoche 53' (o.g.); Niculae 90'	Stadium: Ilie Oană; Attendance: 4,000; Referee: Teodor Grozea (Brăila)

4 May 2018 21	Atletic Bradu	1–4	Petrolul Ploiești	Bradu
18:00 UTC+2	Preda 38'	Report	Păun 22' (72); Arnăutu 36'; Popescu 88'	Stadium: Stadionul Central; Attendance: 1,000; Referee: Lucian Ţiţii (Sibiu)

12 May 2018 22	Petrolul Ploiești	3–1	Mioveni II	Ploiești
14:00 UTC+2	Chindriș 40'; Popescu 71'; Velisar 82'	Report	Comănescu 21'	Stadium: Ilie Oană; Attendance: 4,500; Referee: Andreea Ene (Bucharest)

18 May 2018 23	Astra II Ploiești	2–2	Petrolul Ploiești	Ploiești
18:00 UTC+2	Chipirliu 48'; Gheorghe 89'	Report	Pahonțu 55' (o.g.); Arnăutu 61'	Stadium: Astra; Attendance: 2,000; Referee: Alin Gheorghe (Ploieşti)

26 May 2018 24	Petrolul Ploiești	0–2	SC Popeşti-Leordeni	Ploiești
19:30 UTC+2		Report	Anghilini 22'; Luca 74'	Stadium: Ilie Oană; Attendance: 10,000; Referee: Alexandru Dan Gornic (Arad)

=== Cupa Romaniei ===
9 August 2017 Round 1	FC Regal Sport	1–8	Petrolul Ploiești	Bucharest
17:30 UTC+3	Blănuță 34'	Report	Lambru 7' 51'; Arnăutu 33' 78'; Puchea 45'; Gheorghe 57'; Păun 86'; Ciocâlteu 90'	Stadium: Coresi Stadium; Attendance: 300; Referee: Robert Avram (Piteşti)

22 August 2017 Round 2	Petrolul Ploiești	2–0	Urban Titu	Ploiești
19:00 UTC+3	Lambru 61'; Popescu 64'	Report		Stadium: Stadionul Ilie Oană; Attendance: 3,214; Referee: Ana Maria Terteleac (Berceni)

12 September 2017 Round 3	Petrolul Ploiești	3–0	Flacăra Moreni	Ploiești
19:00 UTC+3	Ciocâlteu 43' 69' (pen.) 88'	Report		Stadium: Stadionul Ilie Oană; Attendance: 3,500; Referee: Vlad Băban (Iași)

3 October 2017 Round 4	Agricola Borcea	1–4	Petrolul Ploiești	Borcea
14:30 UTC+3	Şerban 64'	Report	Şaim 17'; Ciocâlteu 26'; Popescu 30'; Stănescu 81'	Stadium: Comunal; Referee: Cristian Georgescu (Bucharest)

24 October 2017 Round of 32	Petrolul Ploiești	1–1 (a.e.t.) (4–5 p)	Mioveni	Ploiești
18:00 UTC+3	Vintilă 90'	Report	Năstăsie 36'	Stadium: Stadionul Ilie Oană; Attendance: 2,500; Referee: Lucian Rusandu (Sfântu Gheorghe)
	Penalties
	Tudor (penalty scored); Ciocâlteu (penalty missed); Popescu (penalty scored); Stănescu (penalty scored); Velisar (penalty missed)		Năstăsie (penalty scored); Gugu (penalty missed); Negoiță (penalty scored); Stoica (penalty scored); Neacșu (penalty scored)

== See also ==
- 2017–18 Cupa României
- Liga III
