= List of Romanian football transfers winter 2018–19 =

This is a list of Romanian football transfers for the 2018–19 winter transfer window. Only moves featuring 2018–19 Liga I and 2018–19 Liga II are listed.

== Liga I ==
=== Astra Giurgiu ===
In:

No.	Pos.	Nation	Player
—	DF	ROU	Constantin Dima (from Viitorul Constanța)
—	MF	BRA	Romário Pires (from (Israel) Maccabi Petah Tikva)
—	FW	FIN	Vahid Hambo (from (Finland) RoPS)

Out:

No.	Pos.	Nation	Player
—	GK	BUL	Plamen Iliev (to (Bulgaria) Ludogorets Razgrad)
—	DF	USA	Danny Barbir (on loan to (Germany) Sandhausen II)
—	MF	CGO	Dylan Bahamboula (to (Algeria) Constantine)
—	MF	ROU	Robert Boboc (on loan to Mioveni)
—	MF	ROU	Laurențiu Buș (to Botoșani)
—	MF	ROU	Sebastian Culda (on loan to Ocna Mureș, previously on loan at Metaloglobus București)
—	MF	BEN	Djiman Koukou (to Free agent)
—	MF	MDA	Victor Stînă (on loan to (Moldova) Milsami Orhei)
—	FW	ROU	Bogdan Chipirliu (to Gloria Buzău)
—	FW	CMR	Justin Mengolo (to (Malta) Gżira United)

=== Botoșani ===
In:

No.	Pos.	Nation	Player
—	MF	ROU	Bogdan Melinte (loan return from Șomuz Fălticeni)
—	GK	ROU	Iulian Anca-Trip (from Metaloglobus București)
—	GK	MDA	Cristian Apostolachi (from (Moldova) Milsami Orhei)
—	DF	AUT	Marcel Holzmann (from Free agent)
—	MF	ROU	Laurențiu Buș (from Astra Giurgiu)
—	MF	MLI	Moussa Diakité (from (Armenia) Shirak)

Out:

No.	Pos.	Nation	Player
—	GK	MDA	Ianoș Brînză (on loan to Petrolul Ploiești)
—	DF	ROU	Rareș Oprea (to Metalul Buzău)
—	MF	ROU	Sebastian Chitoșcă (to Universitatea Cluj)
—	MF	ROU	Eduard Florescu (on loan to Argeș Pitești)
—	FW	CRO	Marko Brekalo (to Free agent)
—	FW	SRB	Nikola Trujić (to (Serbia) Voždovac)

=== CFR Cluj ===
In:

No.	Pos.	Nation	Player
—	DF	CIV	Kévin Boli (on loan from (China) Guizhou Hengfeng)
—	DF	ROU	Răzvan Horj (from (Hungary) Újpest)
—	FW	ROU	Cristian Bud (from Hermannstadt)

Out:

No.	Pos.	Nation	Player
—	FW	ITA	Giuseppe De Luca (loan return to (Italy) Atalanta)
—	GK	ROU	Horațiu Moldovan (to Ripensia Timișoara, previously on loan at Energeticianul)
—	GK	ROU	Ionuț Rus (on loan to Luceafărul Oradea, previously signed from (Italy) Lazio)
—	DF	ROU	Andrei Radu (on loan to Concordia Chiajna)
—	MF	BRA	Júlio Baptista (to Free agent)
—	MF	ROU	Sebastian Mailat (on loan to Gaz Metan Mediaș)
—	FW	ROU	Gabriel Dodoi (on loan to Pandurii Târgu Jiu, previously on loan at Sepsi Sfântu Gheorghe)
—	FW	ROU	George Ganea (to Viitorul Constanța)
—	FW	CMR	Robert Tambe (on loan to (Moldova) Sheriff Tiraspol)
—	FW	ESP	Urko Vera (to (England) Oldham Athletic)

=== Concordia Chiajna ===
In:

No.	Pos.	Nation	Player
—	GK	ROU	Victor Rîmniceanu (from Sepsi Sfântu Gheorghe)
—	DF	ALG	Liassine Cadamuro (from (Spain) Gimnàstic de Tarragona)
—	DF	GRE	Georgios Koutroumpis (from Free agent)
—	DF	POR	João Meira (from Free agent)
—	DF	ROU	Andrei Radu (on loan from CFR Cluj)
—	MF	FRA	Jules Iloki (from Free agent)
—	FW	ROU	Marius Alexe (from (Turkey) Karabükspor)
—	FW	TUN	Sofien Moussa (from (Scotland) Dundee)

Out:

No.	Pos.	Nation	Player
—	DF	ROU	Dan Panait (loan return to Viitorul Constanța, later on loan at Chindia Târgoviște)
—	GK	ROU	Alexandru Costache (on loan to Pandurii Târgu Jiu)
—	GK	ROU	Bogdan Dascălu (to Free agent)
—	GK	ROU	Daniel Isvoranu (on loan to Daco-Getica București, previously on loan at Petrolul Ploiești)
—	DF	ROU	Mihai Leca (on loan to Chindia Târgoviște)
—	MF	ROU	Dan Bucșa (to Petrolul Ploiești)
—	MF	ROU	Cristian Ciobanu (to Turris-Oltul Turnu Măgurele)
—	MF	ROU	Ronaldo Deaconu (to (Croatia) Gorica)
—	MF	ROU	Andrei Prepeliță (to Free agent)
—	FW	ROU	Paul Batin (to (Cyprus) Doxa Katokopias)
—	FW	ROU	Simon Măzărache (to Mioveni)

=== CS U Craiova ===
In:

No.	Pos.	Nation	Player
—	DF	CRO	Hrvoje Spahija (loan return from (Kazakhstan) Ordabasy)
—	MF	ROU	Radu Bîrzan (loan return from Argeș Pitești)
—	MF	ROU	Stephan Drăghici (loan return from Sepsi Sfântu Gheorghe)
—	GK	ITA	Mirko Pigliacelli (from (Italy) Pro Vercelli, previously on loan)
—	DF	CIV	Stephane Acka (from (Turkey) BB Erzurumspor)
—	FW	ROU	Andrei Cristea (from Politehnica Iași)
—	FW	POR	Carlos Fortes (from Gaz Metan Mediaș)

Out:

No.	Pos.	Nation	Player
—	GK	MDA	Nicolae Calancea (to Dunărea Călărași)
—	DF	ROU	Florin Borța (on loan to Petrolul Ploiești)
—	DF	ROU	Florin Gardoș (on loan to Politehnica Iași)
—	DF	ROU	Ștefan Vlădoiu (on loan to Dunărea Călărași, previously on loan at Sportul Snagov)
—	MF	ROU	Lucian Buzan (on loan to ACS Poli Timișoara, previously on loan at Dunărea Călărași)
—	MF	ROU	Alin Manea (on loan to ASU Politehnica Timișoara, previously on loan at Chindia Târgoviște)
—	FW	ROU	Andrei Burlacu (on loan to Politehnica Iași)
—	FW	CRO	Dominik Glavina (to (Cyprus) Enosis Neon Paralimni)
—	FW	ROU	Sergiu Jurj (to (Hungary) Kazincbarcika, previously on loan at Rapid București)
—	FW	ROU	Alexandru Mitriță (to (United States) New York City)
—	FW	ROU	Alexandru Popescu (on loan to Energeticianul, previously on loan at Mioveni)

=== Dinamo București ===
In:

No.	Pos.	Nation	Player
—	GK	COD	Parfait Mandanda (on loan from (Belgium) Charleroi)
—	DF	ALB	Naser Aliji (from Free agent)
—	DF	FRA	Damien Dussaut (from (Belgium) Sint-Truiden)
—	DF	LTU	Linas Klimavičius (from (Lithuania) Žalgiris)
—	DF	URU	Facundo Mallo (from Free agent)
—	MF	ALG	Rachid Aït-Atmane (from Free agent)
—	MF	ROU	Ioan Filip (from Free agent)
—	MF	BEL	Reda Jaadi (from (Belgium) Royal Antwerp)
—	MF	ALB	Elvis Kabashi (from Free agent)
—	MF	MLI	Mamoutou N'Diaye (from Free agent)
—	FW	ANG	Alexander Christovão (from (Poland) Zagłębie Sosnowiec)
—	FW	MAR	Nabil Jaadi (from Free agent)
—	FW	ITA	Mattia Montini (from Free agent)
—	FW	GRE	Thanasis Papazoglou (from (Israel) Hapoel Haifa)
—	FW	NGR	Simon Zenke (from Free agent)

Out:

No.	Pos.	Nation	Player
—	GK	ROU	Mihai Eșanu (on loan to Daco-Getica București)
—	GK	PAN	Jaime Penedo (to Retired)
—	GK	IRL	Sean McDermott (to (Norway) Kristiansund, previously signed from (Norway) Kristiansund)
—	DF	ROU	Laurențiu Corbu (on loan to (Scotland) St Mirren)
—	DF	BEL	Kino Delorge (to (Belgium) Lierse Kempenzonen)
—	DF	ROU	Marco Ehmann (on loan to Farul Constanța)
—	DF	GRE	Giorgos Katsikas (to (Belarus) Dynamo Brest)
—	DF	FRA	Teddy Mézague (to (Israel) Hapoel Ra'anana)
—	DF	ENG	Jordan Mustoe (to Free agent, previously transferred from (Finland) SJK)
—	DF	ROU	Vlad Olteanu (on loan to ACS Poli Timișoara)
—	DF	ROU	Mihai Popescu (on loan to (Scotland) St Mirren)
—	MF	PAN	Armando Cooper (to (Israel) Maccabi Petah Tikva)
—	MF	ROU	Liviu Gheorghe (on loan to Sportul Snagov, previously on loan at Dacia Unirea Brăila)
—	MF	CRO	Tomislav Gomelt (to (Italy) Crotone)
—	MF	ROU	Sergiu Hanca (to (Poland) Cracovia)
—	MF	CRO	Ivan Pešić (on loan to (Kazakhstan) Shakhter Karagandy)
—	MF	ROU	Sergiu Popovici (to Hermannstadt)
—	MF	POR	Diogo Salomão (to (Saudi Arabia) Al-Hazem)
—	MF	ROU	Andrei Tîrcoveanu (to Viitorul Constanța)
—	MF	ROU	Florin Vasile (to Înainte Modelu)
—	FW	ROU	Mircea Axente (to Universitatea Cluj)
—	FW	ROU	Gheorghe Grozav (to (Hungary) Kisvárda)
—	FW	ROU	Robert Moldoveanu (on loan to Petrolul Ploiești)
—	FW	ROU	Mihai Neicuțescu (on loan to Chindia Târgoviște)
—	FW	FRA	Grégory Tadé (to Free agent, previously signed from Free agent)

=== Dunărea Călărași ===
In:

No.	Pos.	Nation	Player
—	GK	MDA	Nicolae Calancea (from CS U Craiova)
—	DF	TUN	Selim Ben Djemia (from Free agent)
—	DF	ROU	Steliano Filip (from (Croatia) Hajduk Split)
—	DF	ROU	Srdjan Luchin (from Viitorul Constanța)
—	DF	ROU	Constantin Nica (from Free agent)
—	DF	ROU	Cristian Sîrghi (from (Albania) Flamurtari Vlorë)
—	DF	ROU	Ștefan Vlădoiu (on loan from CS U Craiova, previously on loan at Sportul Snagov)
—	MF	ALG	Najib Ammari (from Free agent)
—	MF	ROU	Daniel Benzar (on loan from FCSB)
—	MF	ROU	Gabriel Enache (on loan from (Serbia) Partizan)
—	MF	IRL	Conor Henderson (from Free agent)
—	MF	FRA	Abdelhakim Omrani (from (Belgium) Virton)
—	FW	ROU	Gabriel Iancu (from Voluntari)
—	FW	COD	Junior Mapuku (from (China) Shijiazhuang Ever Bright)
—	FW	TUN	Aymen Souda (from Free agent)
—	FW	ROU	Ianis Stoica (on loan from FCSB)

Out:

No.	Pos.	Nation	Player
—	MF	ROU	Lucian Buzan (loan return to CSU Craiova, later on loan at ACS Poli Timișoara)
—	GK	ROU	Cezar Lungu (to Petrolul Ploiești)
—	DF	ROU	Denis Ispas (to Farul Constanța)
—	DF	ROU	Bogdan Șandru (to Chindia Târgoviște)
—	DF	ROU	Alin Șeroni (to UTA Arad)
—	DF	ROU	Ionuț Țenea (on loan to Aerostar Bacău)
—	DF	BRA	Walace (to (Egypt) Al Ittihad Alexandria)
—	MF	ROU	Alexandru Dincă (on loan to Gloria Buzău, previously on loan at Turris Turnu Măgurele)
—	MF	ROU	Marian Drăghiceanu (on loan to Rapid București)
—	MF	ROU	Baudoin Kanda (to UTA Arad)
—	MF	ESP	Aitor Monroy (to (Spain) Inter de Madrid)
—	MF	ROU	Silviu Pană (to Free agent)
—	MF	ROU	Cristian Pușcaș (to Petrolul Ploiești)
—	FW	ROU	Valentin Alexandru (on loan to Chindia Târgoviște)
—	FW	ROU	Alin Babei (to CSMȘ Reșița)
—	FW	ROU	Nicolae Carnat (to Sepsi Sfântu Gheorghe)
—	FW	FRA	Sacha Clémence (to Free agent)
—	FW	GAB	Gaëtan Missi Mezu (to (Ukraine) Arsenal Kyiv)

=== FCSB ===
In:

No.	Pos.	Nation	Player
—	DF	ROU	Iulian Cristea (from Gaz Metan Mediaș)
—	MF	ROU	Florentin Matei (from (United Arab Emirates) Ittihad Kalba)
—	MF	ROU	Adrian Stoian (from (Italy) Crotone)
—	FW	ROU	Ioan Hora (from Free agent)

Out:

No.	Pos.	Nation	Player
—	MF	BRA	William De Amorim (on loan to (Greece) Xanthi)
—	MF	ROU	Daniel Benzar (on loan to Dunărea Călărași)
—	MF	ROU	Cristian Dumitru (on loan to Academica Clinceni)
—	MF	CRO	Antonio Jakoliš (to (Cyprus) APOEL)
—	MF	ROU	Mario Mihai (to Free agent, previously on loan at Turris-Oltul Turnu Măgurele)
—	MF	BUL	Hristo Zlatinski (to Free agent)
—	FW	ROU	Ianis Stoica (on loan to Dunărea Călărași)

=== Gaz Metan Mediaș ===
In:

No.	Pos.	Nation	Player
—	DF	MKD	Mite Cikarski (from (Greece) PAS Giannina)
—	DF	ROU	Ionuț Larie (from (Kazakhstan) Tobol)
—	DF	ROU	Marian Pleașcă (from Free agent)
—	MF	ROU	Sebastian Mailat (on loan from CFR Cluj)
—	MF	POR	Pedro Mendes (from (Latvia) Ventspils)
—	FW	VEN	Mario Rondón (from (China) Shijiazhuang Ever Bright)

Out:

No.	Pos.	Nation	Player
—	DF	ROU	Iulian Cristea (to FCSB)
—	MF	ROU	Mihai Stancu (to Daco-Getica București)
—	FW	ROU	Alexandru Buziuc (to Academica Clinceni)
—	FW	POR	Carlos Fortes (to CS U Craiova)

=== Hermannstadt ===
In:

No.	Pos.	Nation	Player
—	DF	ROU	Florin Acsinte (from Free agent)
—	DF	ROU	Alexandru Mățel (from (Croatia) Dinamo Zagreb)
—	MF	CRO	Filip Jazvić (from (Bosnia and Herzegovina) Željezničar Sarajevo)
—	MF	AUT	Daniel Offenbacher (from (Lithuania) Sūduva)
—	MF	ROU	Sergiu Popovici (from Dinamo București)
—	FW	CRO	Ivan Lendrić (from (Slovenia) Olimpija Ljubljana)
—	FW	ARG	Matías Roskopf (from Free agent)

Out:

No.	Pos.	Nation	Player
—	GK	ROU	Răzvan Began (to ACS Poli Timișoara)
—	DF	ROU	Robert Bratu (to Pandurii Târgu Jiu)
—	MF	GRE	Bruno Chalkiadakis (to Free agent)
—	MF	CPV	Kuca (to (Portugal) Feirense)
—	MF	COD	Jordan Nkololo (to (Croatia) Istra 1961)
—	FW	BOL	Luis Alí (to (Bolivia) Bolívar)
—	FW	ROU	Cristian Bud (to CFR Cluj, previously signed from (Switzerland) Yverdon Sport)
—	FW	ROU	Andrei Hergheligiu (to Mioveni)
—	FW	ROU	Bogdan Rusu (on loan to Petrolul Ploiești)

=== Politehnica Iași ===
In:

No.	Pos.	Nation	Player
—	GK	ESP	Rubén Miño (from Free agent)
—	DF	ROU	Florin Gardoș (on loan from CS U Craiova)
—	DF	ROU	Ștefan Popescu (from Free agent)
—	MF	POR	Filipe Nascimento (on loan from (Bulgaria) Levski Sofia)
—	MF	FRA	Willy Semedo (from (Belgium) Charleroi, previously on loan at (Belgium) Roeselare)
—	MF	POR	João Teixeira (from (Moldova) Zimbru Chișinău)
—	FW	ROU	Andrei Burlacu (on loan from CS U Craiova)
—	FW	ESP	Boris Garrós (from (Greece) Apollon Smyrnis)

Out:

No.	Pos.	Nation	Player
—	DF	GHA	George Dwubeng (loan return to (Ghana) Dreams, later on loan to (United Arab Emirates) Al-Wasl)
—	FW	GHA	Lawson Bekui (loan return to (Oman) Dhofar Club)
—	GK	ROU	Teodor Axinte (on loan to Energeticianul, previously on loan at Lugoj)
—	GK	ROU	Ștefan Târnovanu (on loan to Sportul Snagov)
—	DF	ROU	Paul Pîrvulescu (to Academica Clinceni)
—	MF	CRC	Dylan Flores (to Sepsi Sfântu Gheorghe)
—	MF	ROU	Iulian Roșu (to Free agent)
—	FW	ROU	Teodor Chirilă (to Bradul Borca, previously on loan at Știința Miroslava)
—	FW	ROU	Andrei Cristea (to CS U Craiova)
—	FW	ROU	Vlad Danale (on loan to Sportul Snagov)
—	FW	UGA	Luwagga Kizito (on loan to (Kazakhstan) Shakhter Karagandy, previously on loan at (Belarus) BATE Borisov)
—	FW	FRA	Martin Mimoun (to (Belgium) Virton)

=== Sepsi Sfântu Gheorghe ===
In:

No.	Pos.	Nation	Player
—	DF	KEN	Aboud Omar (from (Belgium) Cercle Brugge)
—	DF	POL	Sebastian Rudol (from (Poland) Pogoń Szczecin)
—	MF	CRC	Dylan Flores (from Politehnica Iași)
—	MF	ROU	Călin Popescu (from ASU Politehnica Timișoara)
—	FW	ROU	Nicolae Carnat (from Dunărea Călărași)
—	FW	ROU	Andrei Sîntean (from (Czech Republic) Slavia Prague, previously on loan at (Czech Republic) Viktoria Žižkov)

Out:

No.	Pos.	Nation	Player
—	MF	ROU	Stephan Drăghici (loan return to CSU Craiova)
—	FW	ROU	Gabriel Dodoi (loan return to CFR Cluj, later on loan to Pandurii Târgu Jiu)
—	FW	HUN	Dániel Prosser (loan return to (Hungary) Puskás Akadémia, later on loan to (Hungary) Diósgyőr)
—	GK	ROU	Victor Rîmniceanu (to Concordia Chiajna)
—	GK	ROU	Daniel Zaha (on loan to Național Sebiș, previously signed from (Hungary) Balmazújváros)
—	DF	ROU	Ionuț Ursu (on loan to Universitatea Cluj)
—	MF	ROU	Tudor Călin (on loan to Luceafărul Oradea, previously signed from (Germany) Jahn Regensburg)
—	FW	ROU	Zsombor Veress (on loan to KSE Târgu Secuiesc)

=== Viitorul Constanța ===
In:

No.	Pos.	Nation	Player
—	GK	ROU	Árpád Tordai (loan return from Petrolul Ploiești)
—	DF	NED	Bas Kuipers (from (Netherlands) ADO Den Haag)
—	MF	ROU	Tudor Băluță (on loan from (England) Brighton & Hove Albion, previously signed)
—	MF	ROU	Andreas Calcan (from (Netherlands) Almere City)
—	MF	BRA	Eric Pereira (from (Qatar) Al-Markhiya)
—	MF	ROU	Andrei Tîrcoveanu (from Dinamo București)
—	FW	ROU	George Ganea (from CFR Cluj)
—	FW	BRA	Rivaldinho (on loan from (Bulgaria) Levski Sofia)

Out:

No.	Pos.	Nation	Player
—	DF	ROU	Robert Băjan (to Rapid București)
—	DF	ROU	Constantin Dima (to Astra Giurgiu)
—	DF	ROU	Srdjan Luchin (to Dunărea Călărași)
—	DF	ROU	Robert Neciu (on loan to Farul Constanța)
—	DF	ROU	Dan Panait (on loan to Chindia Târgoviște, previously on loan at Concordia Chiajna)
—	DF	ROU	Răzvan Prodan (on loan to Daco-Getica București, previously on loan at Farul Constanța)
—	MF	ROU	Vlad Chera (on loan to Ripensia Timișoara)
—	MF	ROU	Mihai Ene (on loan to ASU Politehnica Timișoara, previously on loan at Petrolul Ploiești)
—	MF	ROU	Robert Grecu (on loan to Daco-Getica București, previously on loan at Petrolul Ploiești)
—	MF	CPV	Mailson Lima (to Ararat-Armenia)
—	FW	ROU	Romeo Bănică (to Free agent, previously on loan at ASU Politehnica Timișoara)
—	FW	ROU	Cristian Ene (on loan to ASU Politehnica Timișoara, previously on loan at Universitatea Cluj)
—	FW	ROU	Robert Răducanu (to FC U Craiova)
—	FW	ROU	Alexandru Stoica (on loan to Petrolul Ploiești)
—	FW	ROU	Mihai Voduț (to (Israel) Beitar Jerusalem)

=== Voluntari ===
In:

No.	Pos.	Nation	Player
—	DF	ROU	Cosmin Achim (loan return from Energeticianul)
—	DF	ROU	Vlad Gîsă (loan return from Chindia Târgoviște)
—	DF	ROU	Mircea Leasă (loan return from Energeticianul)
—	MF	ROU	Marius Bîrsan (loan return from Metaloglobus București)
—	MF	ROU	Laurențiu Manole (loan return from Energeticianul)
—	GK	BUL	Bozhidar Mitrev (from (Bulgaria) Levski Sofia)
—	DF	KOS	Jetmir Krasniqi (on loan from (Switzerland) Lugano)
—	DF	ITA	Adriano Russo (from Free agent)
—	MF	ROU	Doru Popadiuc (from (Kazakhstan) Irtysh Pavlodar)
—	MF	VEN	Franco Signorelli (on loan from (Italy) Salernitana)

Out:

No.	Pos.	Nation	Player
—	GK	ROU	Dinu Moldovan (to ACS Poli Timișoara)
—	DF	ROU	Daniel Mitrache (on loan to Balotești)
—	DF	FRA	Alphousseyni Sané (to Free agent, previously on loan at Metaloglobus București)
—	DF	CRO	Ivan Zgrablić (to (Slovakia) Nitra)
—	MF	ROU	Dorin Capotă (on loan to Balotești, previously on loan at Cetate Deva)
—	MF	ROU	Alexandru Ciucur (to UTA Arad)
—	MF	ROU	Andrei Ionescu (to Metaloglobus București)
—	MF	ROU	Laurențiu Manole (on loan to Sportul Snagov, previously on loan at Energeticianul)
—	MF	BIH	Ivan Sesar (to (Bosnia and Herzegovina) Tuzla City)
—	FW	ROU	Gabriel Iancu (to Dunărea Călărași)
—	FW	BEL	Nathan Kabasele (to Free agent)
—	FW	MTQ	Geoffrey Malfleury (to Free agent)

== Liga II ==
=== Academica Clinceni ===
In:

No.	Pos.	Nation	Player
—	GK	ROU	Andrei Ureche (from Argeș Pitești)
—	DF	ROU	Paul Pîrvulescu (from Politehnica Iași)
—	FW	ROU	Alexandru Buziuc (from Gaz Metan Mediaș)
—	FW	ROU	Cristian Dumitru (on loan from FCSB)
—	FW	ROU	Salvatore Marrone (on loan from FCSB II)

Out:

No.	Pos.	Nation	Player
—	DF	ROU	Mihai Șandru (to Farul Constanța)
—	FW	ROU	Costin Gheorghe (Retired)
—	FW	ROU	Constantin Stoica (to Ripensia Timișoara)

=== ACS Poli Timișoara ===
In:

No.	Pos.	Nation	Player
—	MF	ROU	Lucian Oprea (loan return from UTA Arad)
—	GK	ROU	Răzvan Began (from Hermannstadt)
—	GK	ROU	Dinu Moldovan (from Voluntari)
—	DF	ROU	Dănuț Bilia (from ASU Politehnica Timișoara)
—	DF	ROU	Alin Ghidurea (from Progresul Spartac București)
—	DF	ROU	Antonio Manolache (from (Netherlands) Groningen)
—	DF	ROU	Vlad Olteanu (on loan from Dinamo București)
—	DF	NGR	Sergio Uyi (from (Sudan) Al-Hilal)
—	DF	ITA	Lorenzo Paramatti (from (Italy) Gubbio)
—	MF	ROU	Lucian Buzan (on loan from CSU Craiova, previously on loan at Dunărea Călărași)
—	MF	MDA	Vadim Calugher (from (Moldova) Florești)
—	MF	CMR	Sorel Chemin (from (Cyprus) Ormideia)
—	MF	ROU	Dănuț Munteanu (from Aerostar Bacău)
—	MF	ROU	Daniel Rogoveanu (from Chindia Târgoviște)
—	MF	MDA	Igor Țîgîrlaș (from (Moldova) Zimbru Chișinău)
—	FW	ROU	Alexandru Bădăuță (from Ripensia Timișoara)
—	FW	MDA	Eugen Sidorenco (from (Moldova) Zimbru Chișinău)

Out:

No.	Pos.	Nation	Player
—	GK	ROU	Mădălin Smaranda (to Dumbrăvița)
—	DF	SRB	Igor Basić (to (Montenegro) Budućnost Podgorica)
—	DF	ROU	Cristian Bocșan (to Ghiroda)
—	DF	ROU	Mădălin Ciurariu (to Free agent)
—	DF	SRB	Dušan Ivanov (to Free agent)
—	DF	ROU	Cristian Melinte (to UTA Arad)
—	DF	ROU	Radu Motreanu (on loan to ASU Politehnica Timișoara)
—	DF	ARG	Santiago Rudolf (to Free agent)
—	MF	ROU	Daniel Filip (on loan to Lugoj)
—	MF	SRB	Andrej Mrkela (to Free agent)
—	MF	ROU	Sebastian Velcotă (to CSMȘ Reșița)
—	FW	ROU	Octavian Drăghici (to Ripensia Timișoara)
—	FW	NOR	Saibaa Keita (to FC U Craiova)
—	FW	GHA	Justice Opoku (to Free agent)
—	FW	ROU	Cristian Pădurariu (to Millenium Giarmata)

=== Aerostar Bacău ===
In:

No.	Pos.	Nation	Player
—	GK	ROU	Andrei Udeanu (on loan from Oțelul Galați)
—	DF	ENG	Daniel Boateng (from Free agent)
—	DF	ROU	Iulian Carabela (from Daco-Getica București)
—	DF	ROU	Constantin Drugă (from Energeticianul)
—	DF	ROU	Ionuț Țenea (on loan from Dunărea Călărași)
—	MF	ROU	Alexandru Ciocâlteu (from Petrolul Ploiești)
—	MF	ROU	Alin Gojnea (from Balotești)
—	MF	ROU	Sorin Ichim (from Free agent)
—	MF	ROU	Sorin Tabacariu (from Argeș Pitești)
—	MF	ROU	Stejărel Vișinar (from Bucovina Rădăuți)
—	FW	ROU	Alexandru Pop (from UTA Arad)

Out:

No.	Pos.	Nation	Player
—	MF	ROU	Andrei Gavrilă (loan return to Ardealul Cluj, later signed by Afumați)
—	GK	ROU	Alexandru Hărăguță (to Free agent)
—	DF	ROU	Vasile Chirilescu (on loan to Bucovina Rădăuți)
—	DF	ROU	Ionuț Covăsan (to Free agent)
—	DF	ROU	Radu Honea (to Sportul Chiscani)
—	DF	ROU	Vasilică Mihăeș (to Metalul Buzău)
—	MF	ROU	Cornel Căinari (to Foresta Suceava)
—	MF	ROU	Florin Istrate (to Șoimii Lipova)
—	MF	ROU	Dănuț Munteanu (to ACS Poli Timișoara)
—	MF	ROU	Alexandru Sahru (to Dacia Unirea Brăila)
—	FW	ROU	Adrian Hurdubei (to Free agent)
—	FW	ROU	Andrei Pavel (to Foresta Suceava)

=== Argeș Pitești ===
In:

No.	Pos.	Nation	Player
—	MF	ROU	Eduard Florescu (on loan from Botoșani)

Out:

No.	Pos.	Nation	Player
—	MF	ROU	Radu Bîrzan (loan return to CS U Craiova)
—	GK	ROU	Andrei Ureche (to Academica Clinceni)
—	DF	ROU	Costinel Gugu (to Free agent)
—	DF	ROU	Ionuț Mihăescu (to Afumați)
—	MF	ROU	Sorin Tabacariu (to Aerostar Bacău)
—	FW	ROU	Mădălin Martin (to Daco-Getica București)

=== ASU Politehnica Timișoara ===
In:

No.	Pos.	Nation	Player
—	DF	ROU	Radu Motreanu (on loan from ACS Poli Timișoara)
—	MF	MDA	Cristian Dros (from (Moldova) Zaria Bălți)
—	MF	ROU	Mihai Ene (on loan from Viitorul Constanța, previously on loan at Petrolul Ploiești)
—	MF	ROU	Alin Manea (on loan from CS U Craiova, previously on loan at Chindia Târgoviște)
—	MF	ROU	Fabio Trip (from CNP Timișoara)
—	MF	ROU	Bogdan Vasile (from Chindia Târgoviște)
—	FW	ROU	Cristian Ene (on loan from Viitorul Constanța, previously on loan at Universitatea Cluj)
—	FW	ROU	Octavian Ursu (on loan from Universitatea Cluj)

Out:

No.	Pos.	Nation	Player
—	FW	ROU	Romeo Bănică (loan return to Viitorul)
—	DF	ROU	Dănuț Bilia (to ACS Poli Timișoara)
—	DF	ROU	Tamás Szász (to (Hungary) Füzesgyarmat)
—	MF	ROU	Răzvan Ghinescu (on loan to Ghiroda)
—	MF	NED	Claudio Kiala (on loan to Lugoj, previously signed from (Belgium) Patro Eisden)
—	MF	ROU	Florin Lazea (to Șoimii Lipova)
—	MF	ROU	Bogdan Miholca (to Free agent)
—	MF	ROU	Bogdan Nicolescu (to (Australia) Geelong)
—	MF	ROU	Adrian Poparadu (to Dumbrăvița)
—	MF	ROU	Călin Popescu (to Sepsi Sfântu Gheorghe)
—	FW	ROU	Bogdan Bozian (to Crișul Chișineu-Criș)
—	FW	ROU	Tiberiu Istrătescu (to Ripensia Timișoara, later signed by Free agent)
—	FW	ROU	Gelu Velici (to (Hungary) Cigánd)

=== Balotești ===
In:

No.	Pos.	Nation	Player
—	DF	ROU	Mihai Badea (from Free agent)
—	DF	ROU	Daniel Mitrache (on loan from Voluntari)
—	DF	ROU	Andrei Voineag (from Cetate Deva)
—	MF	ROU	Gabriel Bragă (from Cetate Deva)
—	MF	ROU	Dorin Capotă (on loan from Voluntari, previously on loan at Cetate Deva)
—	MF	ROU	Marius Cocîrlă (from Farul Constanța)
—	MF	ROU	Rafael Licu (from Farul Constanța)

Out:

No.	Pos.	Nation	Player
—	DF	ROU	Constantin Dedu (to Daco-Getica București)
—	DF	ROU	Nicușor Filip (to Free agent)
—	MF	ROU	Alin Gojnea (to Aerostar Bacău)
—	MF	ROU	Adrian Mușat (to Free agent)

=== Chindia Târgoviște ===
In:

No.	Pos.	Nation	Player
—	DF	ROU	Mihai Leca (on loan from Concordia Chiajna)
—	DF	ROU	Dan Panait (on loan from Viitorul Constanța, previously on loan at Concordia Chiajna)
—	DF	ROU	Bogdan Șandru (from Dunărea Călărași)
—	MF	MDA	Vadim Rață (from (Moldova) Milsami Orhei)
—	FW	ROU	Valentin Alexandru (on loan from Dunărea Călărași)
—	FW	ROU	Mihai Neicuțescu (on loan from Dinamo București)

Out:

No.	Pos.	Nation	Player
—	DF	ROU	Vlad Gîsă (loan return to Voluntari)
—	DF	ROU	Marian Niță (to Free agent, previously on loan at Pucioasa)
—	MF	ROU	Alin Manea (loan return to CS U Craiova, later on loan at ASU Politehnica Timișoara)
—	MF	ROU	Andrei Lungu (to Metaloglobus București)
—	MF	ROU	Daniel Rogoveanu (to ACS Poli Timișoara)
—	MF	ROU	Bogdan Vasile (to ASU Politehnica Timișoara)

=== Dacia Unirea Brăila ===
In:

No.	Pos.	Nation	Player
—	GK	ROU	Iulian Moldoveanu (from SR Brașov)
—	GK	USA	Austin Rogers (from (Mongolia) Ulaanbaatar City)
—	DF	USA	Lamine Diakite (to Farul Constanța)
—	DF	ROU	Constantin Mușea (from Odorheiu Secuiesc)
—	DF	ROU	Jean Prunescu (on loan from Petrolul Ploiești)
—	MF	ROU	Robert Căruță (from Free agent)
—	MF	ROU	Alexandru Izmană (from CSMȘ Reșița)
—	MF	NGR	Konyeha Onyeka (from Oțelul Galați)
—	MF	ROU	Alexandru Sahru (from Aerostar Bacău)
—	MF	ROU	Tiberiu Subțirică (from Afumați)
—	FW	USA	Momodou Jallow (from Farul Constanța)

Out:

No.	Pos.	Nation	Player
—	MF	ROU	Gabriel Coți (loan return to CFR II Cluj, later signed by Free agent)
—	MF	ROU	Liviu Gheorghe (loan return to Dinamo București, later on loan at Sportul Snagov)
—	MF	CHN	Lü Yuefeng (loan return to CFR II Cluj, later on loan to Luceafărul Oradea)
—	GK	ROU	Raul Avram (to Farul Constanța)
—	DF	TUN	Hamza Ben Abda (to Free agent)
—	DF	ROU	Darius Hîmpea (to Unirea Dej)
—	DF	ROU	Norris Ichim (to Știința Miroslava)
—	MF	ROU	Mădălin Calu (to Gloria Buzău)
—	MF	ROU	Mihai Maxin (to Energeticianul)
—	MF	FRA	Claudio Merville (to (Spain) EI San Martín)
—	MF	ENG	Luke Tan Xian (to (England) Colliers Wood United)
—	MF	ROU	Raul Vitan (to Sticla Arieșul Turda)
—	FW	CMR	Bertrand Bebey (to Luceafărul Oradea)
—	FW	ROU	Silviu Crăciun (to Urleasca)
—	FW	FRA	Kapit Djoko (to Free agent)
—	FW	FRA	Stephane Le Metayer (to Free agent)
—	FW	ROU	Dragoș Mucuță (to Astra II)
—	FW	ROU	Roland Stănescu (to Progresul 2005)

=== Daco-Getica București ===
In:

No.	Pos.	Nation	Player
—	GK	ROU	Mihai Eșanu (on loan from Dinamo București)
—	GK	ROU	Daniel Isvoranu (on loan from Concordia Chiajna, previously on loan at Petrolul Ploiești)
—	DF	ROU	Constantin Dedu (from Balotești)
—	DF	MDA	Ion Prodan (from CSMȘ Reșița)
—	DF	ROU	Răzvan Prodan (on loan from Viitorul Constanța, previously on loan at Farul Constanța)
—	MF	ROU	Mihai Stancu (from Gaz Metan Mediaș)
—	DF	ROU	Tudor Țăranu (from Farul Constanța)
—	MF	ROU	Robert Grecu (on loan from Viitorul Constanța, previously on loan at Petrolul Ploiești)
—	MF	ROU	Marius Tudorică (from Farul Constanța)
—	FW	ROU	Mădălin Martin (from Argeș Pitești)
—	FW	FRA	Philippe Nsiah (from Pandurii Târgu Jiu)

Out:

No.	Pos.	Nation	Player
—	GK	ROU	Dragoș Balauru (to (Greece) Levadiakos)
—	GK	ROU	Paul Botaș (to Free agent)
—	DF	ROU	Iulian Carabela (to Aerostar Bacău)
—	DF	ROU	Valentin Dima (to Tunari)
—	DF	ROU	Vlad Georgescu (to Free agent)
—	MF	TOG	Charles Acolatse (to (North Macedonia) Sileks)
—	MF	ROU	Marius Grigore (to SR Brașov)
—	MF	ROU	Alexandru Iordănescu (to Viitorul Domnești)
—	MF	ROU	Tiberiu Petriș (to MSE Târgu Mureș)
—	MF	ROU	Răzvan Udrea (to Free agent)
—	FW	FRA	Hicham El Hamdaoui (to (Belarus) Torpedo Minsk)
—	FW	ROU	Vlad Mârzea (to Popești-Leordeni)
—	FW	ROU	Adrian Voicu (to Turris-Oltul Turnu Măgurele)

=== Energeticianul ===
In:

No.	Pos.	Nation	Player
—	DF	ROU	Ionuț Gruia (loan return from Luceafărul Oradea)
—	MF	ROU	Narcis Cîrlig (loan return from Luceafărul Oradea)
—	FW	ROU	Răzvan Gunie (loan return from Luceafărul Oradea)
—	GK	ROU	Teodor Axinte (on loan from Politehnica Iași, previously on loan at Lugoj)
—	GK	MDA	Victor Buga (from (Moldova) Zimbru Chișinău)
—	GK	ROU	Cristian Dică (on loan from CS U II Craiova)
—	DF	BFA	Ismael Guiti (from Free agent)
—	DF	ROU	Adrian Voicu (from SR Brașov)
—	MF	KOS	Drilon Cenaj (from Pandurii Târgu Jiu)
—	MF	ROU	Mihai Maxin (from Dacia Unirea Brăila)
—	MF	ROU	Claudiu Petruș (on loan from CFR II Cluj)
—	MF	ROU	Remus Sandu (from Pașcani)
—	FW	ROU	Sandu Iovu (from Știința Miroslava)
—	FW	ROU	Alexandru Petruș (on loan from CFR II Cluj)
—	FW	ROU	Alexandru Popescu (on loan from CS U Craiova, previously on loan at Mioveni)

Out:

No.	Pos.	Nation	Player
—	GK	ROU	Horațiu Moldovan (loan return to CFR Cluj, later signed by Ripensia Timișoara)
—	DF	ROU	Cosmin Achim (loan return to Voluntari)
—	DF	ROU	Mircea Leasă (loan return to Voluntari)
—	MF	ROU	Laurențiu Manole (loan return to Voluntari)
—	GK	ROU	Bogdan Miron (to (Hungary) Cigánd)
—	DF	ROU	Constantin Drugă (to Aerostar Bacău)
—	DF	ROU	Emil Ninu (to Free agent)
—	DF	ROU	Marius Tomozei (to Metaloglobus București)
—	MF	ROU	Călin Cristea (to Oțelul Galați)
—	MF	ROU	Cosmin Neagu (to Oțelul Galați)
—	MF	ROU	Viorel Nicoară (to Sportul Snagov)
—	MF	ROU	Marian Stoenac (to Filiași)

=== Farul Constanța ===
In:

No.	Pos.	Nation	Player
—	GK	ROU	Raul Avram (from Dacia Unirea Brăila)
—	GK	ROU	Gabriel Frunză (from Mihail Kogălniceanu)
—	DF	TUR	Arif Demir (from Free agent)
—	DF	POR	João Diogo (from Free agent)
—	DF	ROU	Marco Ehmann (on loan from Dinamo București)
—	DF	ROU	Denis Ispas (from Dunărea Călărași)
—	DF	ROU	Robert Neciu (on loan from Viitorul Constanța)
—	DF	ROU	Mihai Șandru (from Academica Clinceni)
—	MF	ROU	Paul Antoche (on loan from Petrolul Ploiești)
—	MF	CPV	Pedro Celestino (from Free agent)
—	MF	ROU	Adrian Juncu (on loan from CS U II Craiova)
—	MF	ROU	Tudor Moldovan (on loan from FCSB II)
—	MF	ROU	Ștefan Pacionel (on loan from FCSB II)
—	MF	ROU	Daniel Toma (on loan from FCSB II)
—	MF	POR	Diogo Rosado (from Free agent)
—	FW	POR	Rafa (from (Portugal) Rio Ave)
—	FW	ROU	Romeo Surdu (from (Moldova) Milsami Orhei)

Out:

No.	Pos.	Nation	Player
—	DF	ROU	Răzvan Prodan (loan return to Viitorul Constanța, later on loan to Daco-Getica București)
—	MF	ROU	Bogdan Petrescu (loan return to Victoria București, later signed by Oltenița)
—	GK	ROU	Rareș Raclău (to Free agent)
—	GK	BUL	Georgi Stavrev (to Făurei)
—	DF	USA	Lamine Diakite (to Dacia Unirea Brăila)
—	DF	ROU	Ciprian Dombrovschi (to Free agent)
—	DF	ROU	Gabriel Frîncu (to Metaloglobus București)
—	DF	ROU	Codruț Matei (to Free agent)
—	DF	ROU	Albert Robu (to Free agent)
—	DF	ALG	Yanis Roumadi (to (Algeria) USM Alger)
—	DF	ROU	Tudor Țăranu (to Daco-Getica București)
—	DF	USA	Kwadwo Twumasi (to Free agent)
—	MF	ROU	Marius Cocîrlă (to Balotești)
—	MF	ROU	Rafael Licu (to Balotești)
—	MF	CGO	Philtzgérald Mbaka (to (Switzerland) Dardania Lausanne)
—	MF	ROU	Marius Tudorică (to Daco-Getica București)
—	FW	ROU	Andrei Apostolache (to Free agent)
—	FW	ROU	Marius Dumitrașcu (to Free agent)
—	FW	ROU	Alexandru Grigoraș (to Free agent)
—	FW	USA	Momodou Jallow (to Dacia Unirea Brăila)
—	FW	ROU	Patrick Niță (to UVT Timișoara)

=== Luceafărul Oradea ===
In:

No.	Pos.	Nation	Player
—	GK	ROU	Ionuț Rus (on loan from CFR Cluj)
—	DF	ROU	Adrian Ciul (from Unirea Tășnad)
—	DF	BFA	François Yabré (from (Norway) Mjølner)
—	DF	BEL	Alan Wanya (from Free agent)
—	MF	ROU	Tudor Călin (on loan from Sepsi Sfântu Gheorghe)
—	MF	ROU	Pavel Nemeș (from Unirea Tășnad)
—	MF	CHN	Lü Yuefeng (on loan from CFR II Cluj, previously on loan at Dacia Unirea Brăila)
—	FW	CMR	Bertrand Bebey (from Dacia Unirea Brăila)

Out:

No.	Pos.	Nation	Player
—	DF	ROU	Ionuț Gruia (loan return to Energeticianul)
—	MF	ROU	Narcis Cîrlig (loan return to Energeticianul)
—	FW	ROU	Răzvan Gunie (loan return to Energeticianul)
—	DF	ROU	Ionuț Ban (to Sânmartin)
—	DF	ROU	Hery Kim (to Pandurii Târgu Jiu)
—	DF	ROU	Andrei Tânc (to Ripensia Timișoara)
—	DF	ROU	Cătălin Toriște (to Sporting Roșiori)
—	MF	ROU	Claudiu Codoban (to FC U Craiova)
—	FW	ROU	Sergiu Pop (to Sânmartin)
—	FW	ROU	Cătălin Țîră (to (Greece) Episkopi)

=== Metaloglobus București ===
In:

No.	Pos.	Nation	Player
—	GK	ROU	Florin Iacob (from Sportul Snagov)
—	DF	ROU	Gabriel Frîncu (from Farul Constanța)
—	DF	ROU	Florin Plămadă (from Petrolul Ploiești)
—	DF	ROU	Marius Tomozei (from Energeticianul)
—	MF	ROU	Claudiu Herea (from Petrolul Ploiești)
—	MF	ROU	Andrei Ionescu (from Voluntari)
—	MF	ROU	Andrei Lungu (from Chindia Târgoviște)
—	MF	ROU	Alexandru Neagu (from Mioveni)
—	MF	ROU	Robert Vîlceanu (from Astra II)

Out:

No.	Pos.	Nation	Player
—	DF	ROU	Florentin Pham (loan return to FCSB II)
—	DF	FRA	Alphousseyni Sané (loan return to Voluntari, later signed by Free agent)
—	MF	ROU	Marius Bîrsan (loan return to Voluntari)
—	MF	ROU	Sebastian Culda (loan return to Astra Giurgiu, later on loan at Ocna Mureș)
—	MF	CMR	Joel Yuh (loan return to Sănătatea Cluj)
—	GK	ROU	Iulian Anca-Trip (to Botoșani)
—	DF	ROU	Nicolae Buzea (to Free agent)
—	DF	ROU	Bogdan Panait (to Slatina)
—	MF	ROU	Valentin Andrei (to Free agent)
—	MF	ROU	Dragoș Bătrînu (to Free agent)
—	FW	USA	Marek Albert (to Free agent)
—	FW	ROU	Andrei Ciolacu (to (Georgia (country)) Tskhinvali)

=== Mioveni ===
In:

No.	Pos.	Nation	Player
—	MF	ROU	Alexandru Isfan (loan return from Unirea Bascov)
—	DF	ROU	Dean Beța (from Free agent)
—	DF	ROU	Alexandru Dumitrache (from Național Sebiș)
—	DF	ROU	Antonio Ristea (from (Germany) SG Unterrath)
—	DF	ROU	Andrei Tirică (from Unirea Bascov)
—	MF	ROU	Robert Boboc (on loan from Astra Giurgiu)
—	MF	ROU	Marian Șerban (on loan from CS U II Craiova)
—	FW	ROU	Andrei Hergheligiu (from Hermannstadt)
—	FW	ROU	Simon Măzărache (from Concordia Chiajna)

Out:

No.	Pos.	Nation	Player
—	FW	ROU	Alexandru Popescu (loan return to CS U Craiova, later on loan at Energeticianul)
—	MF	ROU	Bogdan Arsenică (on loan to Unirea Bascov)
—	MF	ROU	Ovidiu Comănescu (on loan to Unirea Bascov)
—	MF	ROU	Raul Drugă (on loan to Olimpic Cetate Râșnov)
—	MF	ROU	Alexandru Mierlea (on loan to Real Bradu)
—	MF	ROU	Alexandru Neagu (to Metaloglobus București)
—	FW	ROU	Sebastian Ivan (on loan to Unirea Bascov)

=== Pandurii Târgu Jiu ===
In:

No.	Pos.	Nation	Player
—	GK	ROU	Alexandru Costache (on loan from Concordia Chiajna)
—	DF	ROU	Robert Bratu (from Hermannstadt)
—	DF	ROU	Alexandru Dinu-Ivănescu (from CSU II Craiova)
—	DF	ROU	Hery Kim (from Luceafărul Oradea)
—	DF	ROU	Gabriel Oiță (from Vulturii Fărcășești)
—	MF	ROU	Adrian Tănăsoiu (from (Germany) SV Oberfeldkirchen)
—	MF	ROU	Laurențiu Tudor (from Metalurgistul Cugir)
—	FW	ROU	Rareș Cristea (from CSU II Craiova)
—	FW	ROU	Gabriel Dodoi (on loan from CFR Cluj, previously on loan at Sepsi Sfântu Gheorghe)

Out:

No.	Pos.	Nation	Player
—	GK	ROU	Alin Sălăjan (Retired)
—	DF	FRA	Moussa Konaté (to Gloria Buzău)
—	DF	SRB	Milenko Škorić (to (Serbia) Žarkovo)
—	MF	KOS	Drilon Cenaj (to Energeticianul)
—	MF	ROU	Daniel Pârvulescu (to Universitatea Cluj)
—	FW	FRA	Philippe Nsiah (to Daco-Getica București)

=== Petrolul Ploiești ===
In:

No.	Pos.	Nation	Player
—	GK	MDA	Ianoș Brînză (on loan from Botoșani)
—	GK	ROU	Cezar Lungu (from Dunărea Călărași)
—	DF	ROU	Florin Borța (on loan from CS U Craiova)
—	DF	GRE	Georgios Sarris (from Free agent)
—	MF	ROU	Dan Bucșa (from Concordia Chiajna)
—	MF	GRE	Chrysovalantis Kozoronis (from (Greece) Ergotelis)
—	MF	ARM	Edgar Malakyan (from (Kazakhstan) Zhetysu)
—	MF	ROU	Cristian Pușcaș (from Dunărea Călărași)
—	MF	ROU	Alexandru Stoica (on loan from Viitorul Constanța)
—	FW	ROU	Robert Moldoveanu (on loan from Dinamo București)
—	FW	ROU	Bogdan Rusu (on loan from Hermannstadt)

Out:

No.	Pos.	Nation	Player
—	GK	ROU	Daniel Isvoranu (loan return to Concordia Chiajna, later on loan at Daco-Getica București)
—	GK	ROU	Árpád Tordai (loan return to Viitorul Constanța)
—	MF	ROU	Robert Grecu (loan return to Viitorul Constanța, later on loan to Daco-Getica București)
—	MF	ROU	Mihai Ene (loan return to Viitorul Constanța, later on loan at ASU Politehnica Timișoara)
—	DF	ROU	Florin Plămadă (to Metaloglobus București)
—	DF	ROU	Jean Prunescu (on loan to Dacia Unirea Brăila)
—	DF	ROU	Andrei Rus (on loan to Gloria Buzău, previously on loan at Afumați)
—	DF	ROU	Mihai Velisar (on loan to Gloria Buzău)
—	MF	ROU	Paul Antoche (on loan to Farul Constanța)
—	MF	ROU	Alexandru Ciocâlteu (to Aerostar Bacău)
—	MF	ROU	Antonio Cruceru (to Turris-Oltul Turnu Măgurele)
—	MF	ROU	Cristian Danci (to Gloria Buzău)
—	MF	ROU	Claudiu Herea (to Metaloglobus București)
—	FW	NED	Jeroen Lumu (to (Portugal) Arouca)
—	FW	ISR	Toto Tamuz (to Free agent)

=== Ripensia Timișoara ===
In:

No.	Pos.	Nation	Player
—	GK	ROU	Horațiu Moldovan (from CFR Cluj, previously on loan at Energeticianul)
—	DF	ROU	Andrei Tânc (from Luceafărul Oradea)
—	MF	ROU	Vlad Chera (on loan from Viitorul Constanța)
—	FW	ROU	Octavian Drăghici (from ACS Poli Timișoara)
—	FW	ROU	Constantin Stoica (from Academica Clinceni)

Out:

No.	Pos.	Nation	Player
—	GK	ROU	Iulius Rădulescu (to Carani Murani)
—	DF	ROU	Alin Bărîcă (to Cetate Deva)
—	DF	ROU	Răzvan Cluci (on loan to Ghiroda)
—	DF	ROU	Marius Toma (to Fortuna Becicherecu Mic)
—	MF	ROU	Iustin Ardelean (to Unirea Mirșid)
—	MF	JPN	Takenori Kawagoe (to Free agent)
—	MF	ROU	Mihăiță Lemnaru (to Unirea Slobozia)
—	MF	ROU	Raul Șimian (to Free agent, previously on loan at Sporting Roșiori)
—	FW	ROU	Alexandru Bădăuță (to ACS Poli Timișoara)
—	FW	ROU	Tiberiu Istrătescu (to Free agent, previously signed from ASU Politehnica Timișoara)

=== Sportul Snagov ===
In:

No.	Pos.	Nation	Player
—	GK	CGO	M'Sendo Kololo (from Free agent)
—	GK	ROU	Ștefan Târnovanu (on loan from Politehnica Iași)
—	MF	FRA	Bilel Aït Malek (from (Bulgaria) Vereya)
—	MF	ROU	Paul Cubleșan (from UTA Arad)
—	MF	ROU	Liviu Gheorghe (on loan from Dinamo București, previously on loan at Dacia Unirea Brăila)
—	MF	ROU	Laurențiu Manole (on loan from Voluntari, previously on loan at Energeticianul)
—	MF	ROU	Viorel Nicoară (from Energeticianul)
—	FW	ROU	Vlad Danale (on loan from Politehnica Iași)

Out:

No.	Pos.	Nation	Player
—	DF	ROU	Ștefan Vlădoiu (loan return to CS U Craiova, later on loan to Dunărea Călărași)
—	GK	ROU	Florin Iacob (to Metaloglobus București)
—	DF	ROU	Mihai Ciobanu (to Free agent)
—	DF	ROU	Cătălin Oanea (to Rapid București)
—	MF	ROU	Stelu Costache (to Free agent)
—	MF	ROU	Cătălin Hlistei (to Rapid București)
—	MF	ROU	Bogdan Oancea (to Free agent)
—	FW	GRE	Evangelos Skraparas (to (Cambodia) Visakha)

=== Universitatea Cluj ===
In:

No.	Pos.	Nation	Player
—	DF	ROU	Ionuț Ursu (on loan from Sepsi Sfântu Gheorghe)
—	MF	ROU	Sebastian Chitoșcă (from Botoșani)
—	MF	ROU	Norbert János (on loan from (Hungary) Ferencváros, previously on loan at UTA Arad)
—	MF	ROU	Daniel Pârvulescu (from Pandurii Târgu Jiu)
—	FW	ROU	Mircea Axente (from Dinamo București)

Out:

No.	Pos.	Nation	Player
—	FW	ROU	Cristian Ene (loan return to Viitorul Constanța, later on loan to ASU Politehnica Timișoara)
—	GK	ROU	Călin Albuț (Retired)
—	DF	SRB	Jevrem Kosnić (to Free agent)
—	FW	ROU	Octavian Ursu (on loan to ASU Politehnica Timișoara)

=== UTA Arad ===
In:

No.	Pos.	Nation	Player
—	DF	ROU	Alexandru Deliman (loan return from Crișul Chișineu-Criș)
—	DF	ROU	Raul Iova (loan return from Șoimii Lipova)
—	DF	ROU	Răzvan Ivan (from Unirea Alba Iulia)
—	DF	ROU	Cristian Melinte (from ACS Poli Timișoara)
—	DF	ROU	Alin Șeroni (from Dunărea Călărași)
—	MF	ROU	Alexandru Ciucur (from Voluntari)
—	MF	ROU	Rareș Deta (loan return from Gloria L.T. Cermei)
—	MF	ROU	Baudoin Kanda (from Dunărea Călărași)
—	MF	ROU	Ionuț Neagu (from Free agent)

Out:

No.	Pos.	Nation	Player
—	MF	ROU	Norbert János (loan return to (Hungary) Ferencváros, later on loan to Universitatea Cluj)
—	MF	ROU	Lucian Oprea (loan return to ACS Poli Timișoara)
—	GK	ROU	Marinel Creța (on loan to Șoimii Lipova)
—	DF	ROU	Daniel Dan (to Free agent)
—	DF	ROU	Denis Dardai (on loan to Șoimii Lipova)
—	DF	ROU	Răzvan Onuțan (on loan to Național Sebiș)
—	DF	ROU	Sergiu Sabău (on loan to Crișul Chișineu-Criș)
—	DF	ROU	Adrian Suslak (to Crișul Chișineu-Criș)
—	MF	ROU	Luca Bodri (on loan to Progresul Pecica, previously on loan at Crișul Chișineu-Criș)
—	MF	ROU	Toma Bodri (on loan to Progresul Pecica, previously on loan at Crișul Chișineu-Criș)
—	MF	ROU	Paul Cubleșan (to Sportul Snagov)
—	MF	ROU	Andrei Enescu (to Gloria Buzău)
—	MF	ROU	Călin Gruiescu (on loan to Gloria L.T. Cermei)
—	MF	ROU	Angelo Iuga (to Gloria L.T. Cermei)
—	MF	ROU	Alexandru Nagy (on loan to Șoimii Lipova)
—	MF	ROU	Raul Obrad (on loan to Șoimii Lipova)
—	MF	ROU	Vasile Petra (to CSM Târgu Mureș)
—	MF	ROU	Daniel Vădrariu (to CSMȘ Reșița)
—	FW	ROU	Alexandru Pop (to Aerostar Bacău)
