= Former Ploiești derby =

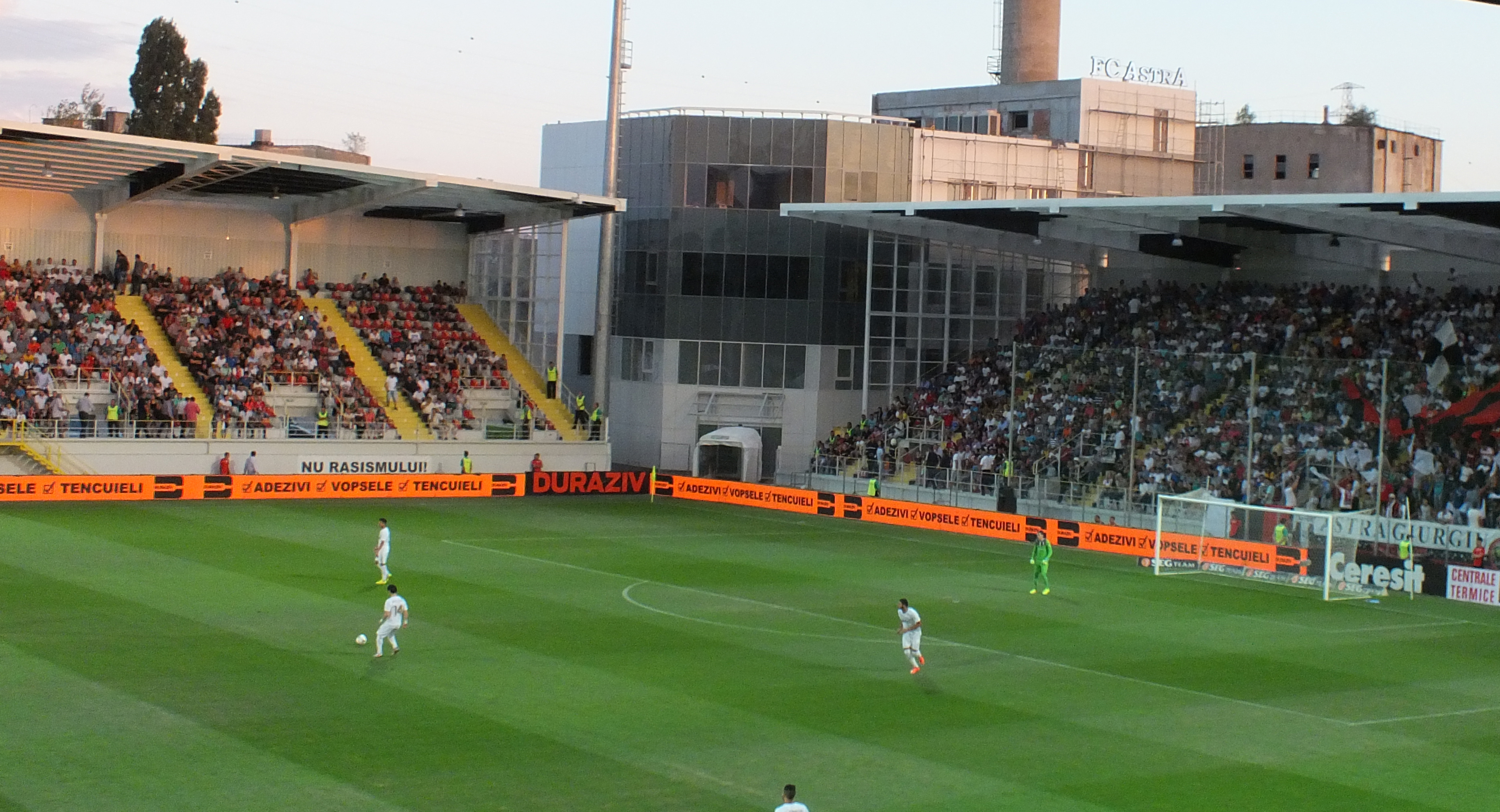
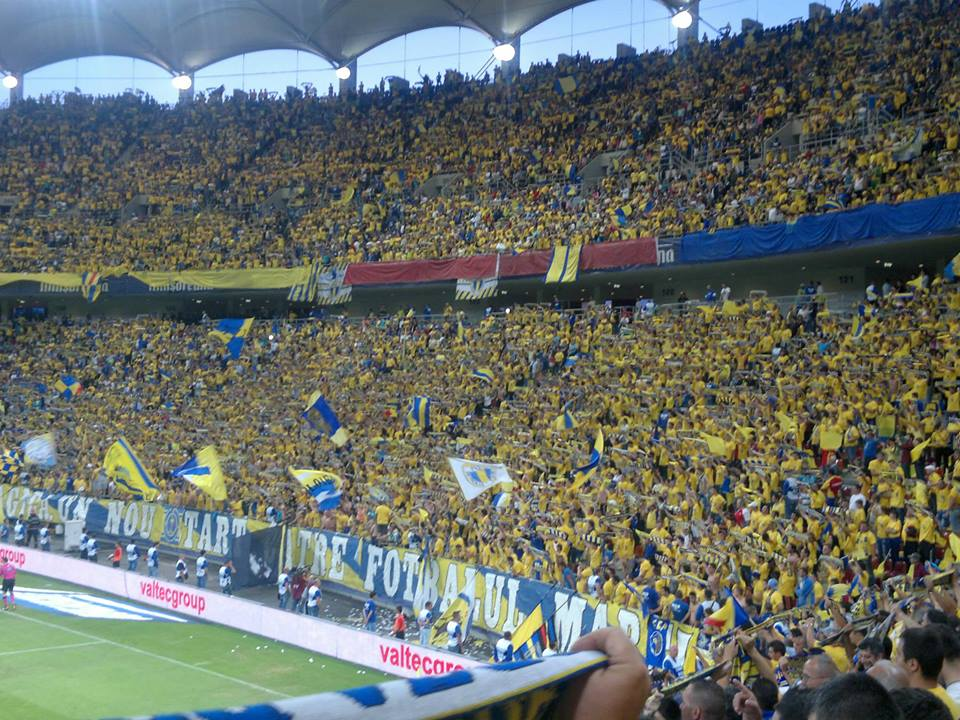
- Astra fans (top) and Petrolul fans (bottom)
- Location: Romania (formerly Ploiești)
- Teams: Petrolul Ploiești; Astra Giurgiu
- First meeting: Petrolul Ploiești 2–1 Astra Ploiești; 1998–99 Divizia A (8 August 1998)
- Latest meeting: Astra Giurgiu 1–2 Petrolul Ploiești; 2021–22 Liga II (31 October 2021)

Statistics
- Total meetings: 27
- Most wins: Petrolul Ploiești (10)

The Former Ploiești derby (Romanian: Fostul derbi al Ploieștiului) was the name given in football to any match between Romanian clubs Petrolul Ploiești and Astra Giurgiu. The two sides won a combined eleven domestic titles, and as of 2024 Petrolul competes in the Liga I, while Astra last played in the Liga III and is dissolved.

== Background and history ==
Neither team played continuously in the city of Ploiești since inception; Astra was founded in 1921 in Ploiești as Clubul Sportiv Astra-Română, while Petrolul appeared three years later in the Romanian capital of Bucharest as Juventus, following a merger. The latter won its first league championship in the 1929–30 season, and in 1952 moved to Ploiești and changed its name to Flacăra Ploiești accordingly. It achieved three more national titles in 1957–58, 1958–59 and 1965–66.

The rivalry only started in 1998, when Astra promoted for the first time to the Liga I under the ownership of businessman Ioan Niculae. Their first meeting was a league fixture on 8 August 1998, which Petrolul won 2–1 at home. In July 2003, Astra Ploiești changed its name to FC Petrolul Ploiești, with Florin Bercea and Ioan Niculae becoming owners of the newly-formed entity and also with the home ground moving to Astra Stadium. According to the Romanian Football Federation, the new entity took over Petrolul's brand and record; Astra was refounded by Niculae in 2005 as CSM Ploiești after he renounced his stake in Petrolul.

In September 2012, Astra relocated to Giurgiu after 91 years in Prahova County, but even after the move the rivalry continued between the governances of the two clubs, with Ioan Niculae claiming at one point that Petrolul does not have any honours after the events of 2003–2005. While Astra did not attract large crowds in neither Ploiești nor Giurgiu, Petrolul fans continued to consider their derby with Rapid București the most important one.

Astra became a prominent figure in Romanian football in the 2010s, as it won its first four major honours (one national title, one national cup, and two supercups) and qualified twice for the UEFA Europa League group stages in Giurgiu. During the same time period, Petrolul only won one Cupa României in the 2012–13 season, and went bankrupt in 2016. Astra additionally lost three cup finals in 2017, 2019, and 2021 on the Ilie Oană Stadium in Ploiești, the home ground of its former local opponent.

The two rivals met again in the same league during the 2021–22 Liga II season, but their ultimate fates were antithetical—Petrolul returned to the Liga I after ascending through the Romanian league system, while Astra relegated to the third division. On 19 October 2022, Astra withdrew from the championship and was subsequently dissolved.

== Statistics ==
=== Head to head results ===
As of game played 31 October 2021

Competition	Played	Petrolul wins	Draws	Astra wins	Petrolul goals	Astra goals
Liga I	18	6	7	5	20	19
Liga II	5	3	1	1	11	8
Cupa României	4	1	1	2	2	5
Total	27	10	9	8	33	32

=== Honours ===
Petrolul Ploiești	Competition	Astra Giurgiu
Major
4	Liga I	1
3	Cupa României	1
0	Supercupa României	2
7	Aggregate	4
Lower leagues
9	Liga II	1
1	Liga III	1
1	Liga IV	0
11	Aggregate	2
18	Total aggregate	6

== All matches ==
Petrolul Ploiești win Draw Astra Giurgiu win

As of game played 31 October 2021

Date	Venue	Score	Competition
8 August 1998	Stadionul Ilie Oană	2–1	Liga I
13 March 1999	Stadionul Astra	1–1	Liga I
31 October 1999	Stadionul Astra	2–0	Liga I
3 May 2000	Stadionul Ilie Oană	1–0	Liga I
17 November 2000	Stadionul Astra	0–0	Liga I
9 June 2001	Stadionul Ilie Oană	3–1	Liga I
11 August 2001	Stadionul Ilie Oană	1–0	Liga I
16 March 2002	Stadionul Astra	2–1	Liga I
24 September 2005	Stadionul Ilie Oană	4–2	Liga II
15 April 2006	Stadionul Astra	0–1	Liga II
24 August 2008	Stadionul Ilie Oană	2–3	Liga II
8 March 2009	Stadionul Astra	2–2	Liga II
27 October 2011	Stadionul Astra	1–0	Cupa României
5 November 2011	Stadionul Astra	1–1	Liga I
6 May 2012	Stadionul Ilie Oană	3–1	Liga I
10 November 2012	Stadionul Marin Anastasovici	1–1	Liga I
18 May 2013	Stadionul Ilie Oană	1–1	Liga I
25 August 2013	Stadionul Marin Anastasovici	1–2	Liga I
16 March 2014	Stadionul Ilie Oană	1–1	Liga I
26 March 2014	Stadionul Ilie Oană	0–0	Cupa României
16 April 2014	Stadionul Marin Anastasovici	2–1	Cupa României
27 October 2014	Stadionul Marin Anastasovici	0–0	Liga I
30 April 2015	Stadionul Ilie Oană	1–2	Liga I
30 August 2015	Stadionul Ilie Oană	0–1	Liga I
12 December 2015	Stadionul Marin Anastasovici	3–1	Liga I
3 March 2021	Stadionul Ilie Oană	0–3	Cupa României
31 October 2021	Stadionul Marin Anastasovici	1–2	Liga II

=== Games involving second teams ===
Petrolul Ploiești win Draw Astra Giurgiu 2 win

As of game played 10 April 2018

Date	Venue	Score	Competition
11 November 2017	Stadionul Ilie Oană	0–0	Liga III
18 May 2018	Stadionul Astra	2–2	Liga III

== Players with both sides ==
The footballer with the most appearances combined (560) for both sides combined is Takayuki Seto. One of the most notable footballers to play for both clubs is 2017 Romanian Footballer of the Year winner Constantin Budescu—he appeared in more than 410 matches in all competitions for Petrolul and Astra combined, as of 2023.

- (Portugal) Geraldo Alves
- (Romania) Mirel Bolboașă
- (France) Damien Boudjemaa
- (Romania) Constantin Budescu
- (Romania) Nicolae Constantin
- (Romania) Daniel Costescu
- (Romania) Marian Cristescu
- (Romania) Dragoș Gheorghe
- (Romania) Romario Moise
- (North Macedonia) Mirko Ivanovski
- (Romania) Adrian Pătulea
- (Romania) Paul Papp
- (Brazil) Romário Pires
- (Romania) Bogdan Rusu
- (Japan) Takayuki Seto
- (Romania) Pompiliu Stoica
- (Romania) Gabriel Tamaș
- (Portugal) Filipe Teixeira
- (Romania) Dinu Todoran
- (Romania) Claudiu Tudor
- (Romania) Alexandru Țigănașu
- (Romania) Cristian Vlad

== See also ==
- Sports rivalry
