= Dragoș Gheorghe =

Romanian professional footballer

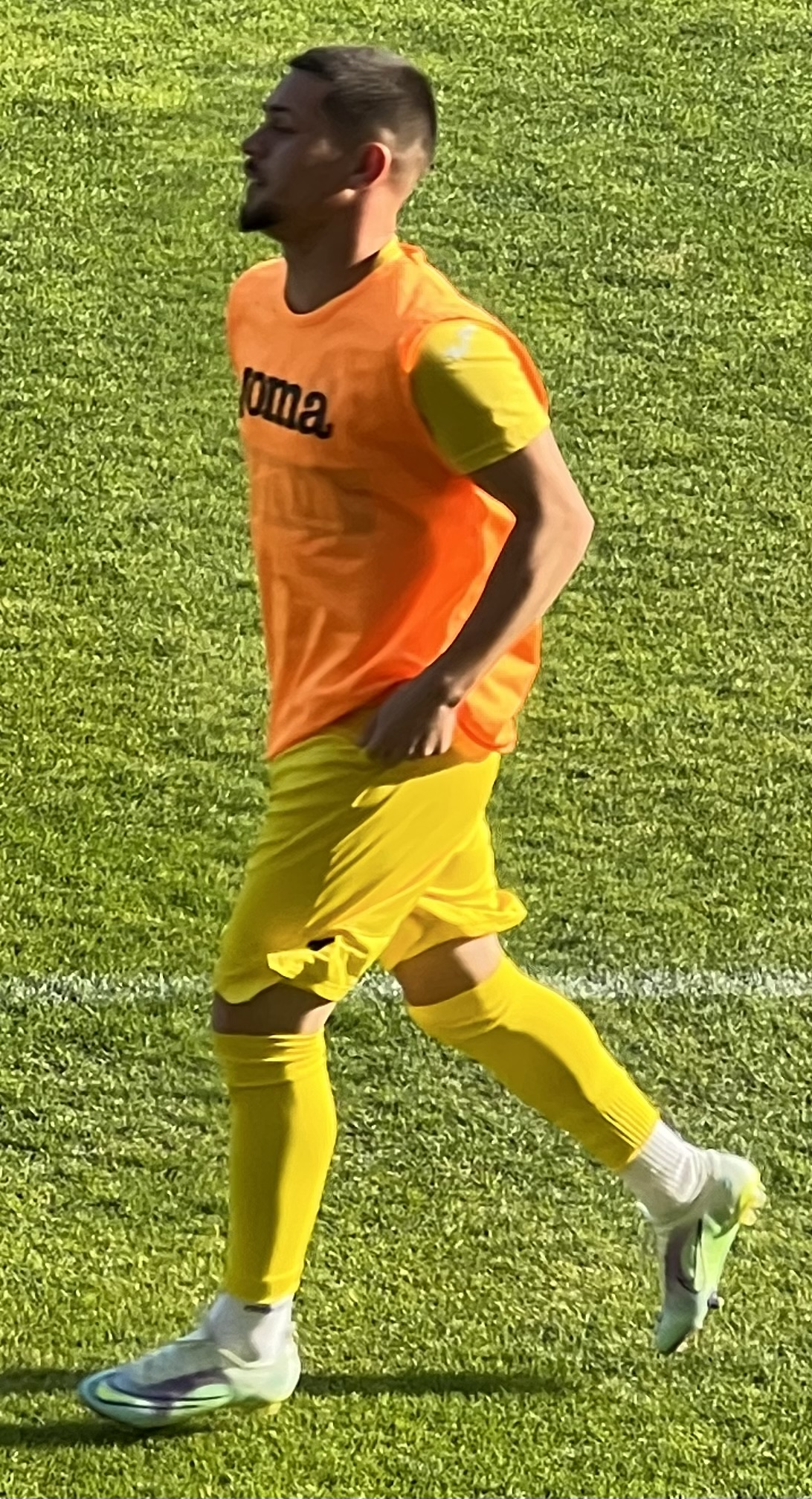
- Gheorghe with Petrolul Ploiești in 2022

Personal information
- Date of birth: 10 January 1999 (age 27)
- Place of birth: Ploiești, Romania
- Height: 1.60 m (5 ft 3 in)
- Position: Midfielder

Team information
- Current team: Unirea Ungheni

Youth career
- –2016: Astra Giurgiu

Senior career*
Years	Team	Apps	(Gls)
2016–2019	Astra II Giurgiu		
2019–2022	Astra Giurgiu	22	(5)
2022	→ Petrolul Ploiești (loan)	4	(0)
2022–2023	Petrolul Ploiești	0	(0)
2022–2023	→ CSA Steaua București (loan)	11	(1)
2023–2024	Tunari	19	(4)
2024–	Unirea Ungheni	0	(0)
- * Club domestic league appearances and goals as of 11 May 2024

Dragoș Gheorghe (Romanian pronunciation: [ˈdraɡoʃ ˈɡe̯orɡe]; born 10 January 1999) is a Romanian professional footballer who plays as a midfielder for Liga II club Unirea Ungheni.

== Career ==
Gheorghe made his senior debut for Astra Giurgiu on 4 November 2019, being brought on for Constantin Budescu in the 84th minute of a 4–0 Liga I victory over Politehnica Iași. On 31 July 2021, he scored his first goal for the club in a 1–2 Liga II loss to Metaloglobus București.

On 13 January 2022, Gheorghe moved to rival side Petrolul Ploiești on a one-and-a-half-year loan deal.

== Honours ==
Astra Giurgiu

- Cupa României runner-up: 2020–21

Petrolul Ploiești

- Liga II: 2021–22
