= FC Astra II Giurgiu =

FC Astra II Giurgiu may refer to:

- CSM Dunărea Giurgiu, a men's football club, named as FC Astra II Giurgiu between 2010 and 2012
- FC Astra II, a men's football club, founded in 2013
