= 2024–25 CS Corvinul Hunedoara season =

CS Corvinul Hunedoara
2024–25 season
- Manager: Florin Maxim
- Stadium: Michael Klein Stadium
- Liga II: Play-off round
- Cupa României: 7th
- Supercupa României: Runners-up
- UEFA Europa League: Second qualifying round
- UEFA Conference League: Third qualifying round
- Top goalscorer: League: All: Marius Lupu (3)
- Biggest win: Paksi FC 0–4 Corvinul Hunedoara
- Biggest defeat: Corvinul Hunedoara 0–2 Paksi F
Home colours	Away colours	Third colours

The 2024–25 season was the 104th season in the history of CS Corvinul Hunedoara, and the club's second consecutive season in Liga II. In addition to the domestic league, the team participated in the Cupa României, the Supercupa României, the UEFA Europa League, and the UEFA Conference League.

== Transfers ==
=== In ===
Pos.	Player	Transferred from	Fee	Date	Source
GK	(Romania) Florin Iacob	(Romania) UTA Arad	Free	1 July 2024	
MF	(Netherlands) Desley Ubbink	(Netherlands) FC Emmen	Undisclosed	1 July 2024	
MF	(Brazil) Roger	(Romania) Universitatea Cluj	Loan	1 July 2024	
FW	(Romania) Sergiu Buș	(Romania) Politehnica Iași	Free	1 July 2024	
FW	(Romania) Darius Grigore	(Romania) ARO Muscelul Câmpulung		1 July 2024	

=== Out ===
Pos.	Player	Transferred to	Fee	Date	Source
DF	(Romania) Yanis Răducanu	(Romania) Viitorul Pandurii Târgu Jiu	Loan	1 July 2024	
FW	(Romania) Marius Coman	(Romania) Sepsi OSK	End of contract	1 July 2024	

== Friendlies ==
=== Pre-season ===
The training began on 10 June 2024. The team is holding camp in Slovenia starting 17 June.

21 June 2024 Friendly	Corvinul Hunedoara (Romania)	2–3	(Slovenia) Mura	Gornja Radgona, Slovenia
18:00	42'; 54' (pen.)		5'; 17'; 80'

25 June 2024 Friendly	Celje (Slovenia)	2–0	(Romania) Corvinul Hunedoara	Ljubljana, Slovenia
17:30	(penalty missed) 5'; 35'; 65'

27 June 2024 Friendly	Borac Banja Luka (Bosnia and Herzegovina)	2–0	(Romania) Corvinul Hunedoara
17:30	11'; 71'

== Competitions ==
=== Overall record ===
Competition	First match	Last match	Starting round	Final position	Record							
Competition	First match	Last match	Starting round	Final position	Pld	W	D	L	GF	GA	GD	Win %
Liga II	18 August 2024		Matchday 1		0	0	0	0	0	0	+0	—
Cupa României					0	0	0	0	0	0	+0	—
Supercupa României	4 July 2024		Final	Runners-up	1	0	0	1	0	3	−3	0.00
UEFA Europa League	11 July 2024	1 August 2024	First qualifying round	Secon qualifying round	4	1	1	2	4	3	+1	25.00
UEFA Conference League	8 August 2024		Third qualifying round		0	0	0	0	0	0	+0	—
Total					5	1	1	3	4	6	−2	20.00

Last updated: 1 August 2024
Source: Soccerway

=== Liga II ===
==== Results summary ====
Overall								Home						Away					
Pld	W	D	L	GF	GA	GD	Pts	W	D	L	GF	GA	GD	W	D	L	GF	GA	GD
21	10	5	6	23	17	+6	35	5	5	2	14	8	+6	5	0	4	9	9	0

Last updated: 12 April 2025.
Source: soccerway

==== Matches ====
25 August 2024 4	Voluntari	2–0	Corvinul Hunedoara	Voluntari
17:00 EEST	Nemec 53'; Andrei 86'	Report		Stadium: Anghel Iordănescu Stadium; Referee: (Romania) Răzvan Negară

1 September 2024 5	Corvinul Hunedoara	1–1	Ceahlăul Piatra Neamț	Hunedoara
11:30 EEST	Lucas Câmpan 17'	Report	Crețu 50'	Stadium: Michael Klein Stadium; Referee: (Romania) Sorin Dan Vădana

18 September 2024 1	Corvinul Hunedoara	1–0	1599 Șelimbăr	Hunedoara
17:00 EEST	Manolache 23'	Report		Stadium: Michael Klein Stadium; Referee: (Romania) Ovidiu Robu

21 September 2024 7	Corvinul Hunedoara	3–0	Câmpulung Muscel	Hunedoara
11:00 EEST	Hergheligiu 39' (pen.); Nicolae Pîrvulescu 77'; Goodnews Chukwu 90+2'	Report		Stadium: Michael Klein Stadium; Referee: (Romania) Mihai Laurențiu Ene

25 September 2024 2	Unirea Ungheni	1–2	Corvinul Hunedoara	Ungheni
17:00 EEST	Ioan Barstan 45'	Report	Goodnews Chukwu 53'; Manolache 90'	Stadium: Central Stadium; Referee: (Romania) Valentin Naidin

28 September 2024 8	Argeș	0–1	Corvinul Hunedoara	Mioveni
12:00 EEST		Report	Velisar 68'	Stadium: Orășenesc Stadium; Referee: (Romania) Eduard Ioniţă

=== Cupa României ===
22 August 2024 Third Round	Viitorul Târgu Jiu	0-3	Corvinul Hunedoara	Drobeta-Turnu Severin
17:30 EEST		Report		Stadium: Municipal Stadium

29 August 2024 Play-off round	Argeș	2-0	Corvinul Hunedoara	Mioveni
17:30 EEST	Roman 4'; Andrei Dinu (yellow card) 13'; Buhăcianu 45+1'; Petrescu (yellow card) 72'; Straton (yellow card) 90+4'	Report	Manolache (yellow card) 82'	Stadium: Orășenesc Stadium; Referee: (Romania) Rusandu Lucian

=== Supercupa României ===
Corvinul Hunedoara enters the tournament having won the domestic cup.

4 July 2024 Final	FCSB	3–0	Corvinul Hunedoara	Bucharest
20:00	Miculescu 21'; Ștefănescu 52'; Phelipe 80'			Stadium: Steaua Stadium; Referee: Florin Andrei
Note: The match was scheduled to be played on 6 July, but its date was moved forward to avoid conflicting with the Euro 2024 qualifiers.

=== UEFA Europa League ===
==== First qualifying round ====
The draw was held on 18 June 2024.

11 July 2024 First leg	Paksi FC (Hungary)	0–4	(Romania) Corvinul Hunedoara	Paks, Hungary
19:00 UTC+2	Kinyik (yellow card) 32'; Vécsei (yellow card) 72'; Szabó (red card) 78'	Report	Buș 9'; Neacșa (yellow card) 86'; Lupu 45+2', 86', 90+3'; Bradu (yellow card) 89'; Manolache (yellow card) 90+7'	Stadium: Fehérvári úti Stadion; Referee: Mohammad Usman Aslam (Norway)

18 July 2024 Second leg	Corvinul Hunedoara (Romania)	0–2 (4–2 agg.)	(Hungary) Paksi FC	Sibiu
21:00 UTC+3	Buș (yellow card) 90+2'	Report	Kinyik (yellow card) 49'; Kovács (yellow card) 54'; Könyves 78'; Windecker (yellow card) 81'; Böde 90'; Szabó (yellow card) 90+1'	Stadium: Sibiu Municipal Stadium; Referee: Peter Kráľovič (Slovakia)

==== Second qualifying round ====
25 July 2024 First leg	Corvinul Hunedoara (Romania)	0–0	(Croatia) Rijeka	Sibiu
20:00 UTC+3	Buș (yellow card) 16'; Lică (yellow card) 76'; Hrezdac (yellow card) 88'	Report		Stadium: Sibiu Municipal Stadium; Referee: Philip Farrugia (Malta)

1 August 2024 Second leg	Rijeka (Croatia)	1–0 (1–0 agg.)	(Romania) Corvinul Hunedoara	Rijeka, Croatia
20:00 UTC+2	Petrovič 12'	Report		Stadium: Stadion Rujevica

=== UEFA Conference League ===
==== Third qualifying round ====
8 August 2024 First leg	Corvinul Hunedoara (Romania)	1–2	(Kazakhstan) Astana	Sibiu
				Stadium: Sibiu Municipal Stadium

15 August 2024 Second leg	Astana (Kazakhstan)	6–1 (8–2 agg.)	(Romania) Corvinul Hunedoara	Astana, Kazakhstan
				Stadium: Astana Arena
