= Arnautu =

Arnautu is a surname. Notable people with the surname include:

- Marie-Christine Arnautu (born 1952), French politician
- Sergiu Arnăutu (born 1990), Romanian footballer
