= CS Conpet Ploiești =

Romanian association football club

Conpet Ploiești
- Full name: Clubul Sportiv Conpet Ploiești
- Nicknames: Transportatorii (The carriers)
- Founded: 1968
- Dissolved: 2015
- Ground: Conpet
- Capacity: 1,732
- 2014–15: Liga IV, Prahova County, 17th
Home colours	Away colours

Clubul Sportiv Conpet Ploiești, also known as Conpet Ploiești, was a Romanian football club from Strejnicu, Prahova County. Founded in 1968 and disbanded in 2015, Conpet played fifteen consecutive seasons in the Romanian third football division between 1999 and 2014.

The club played at the Conpet Stadium in Strejnicu, located 3 km from Ploiești and was supported financially by Conpet, the national operator for transporting crude oil and derivatives through pipelines from Romania.

== History ==
Founded in 1968, Conpet played most of its history in the lower leagues, managing to promoted in Divizia C at the end of the 1998–99 season after won Liga IV – Prahova County.

The carriers played the next seasons the Romanian third football division occupied the following position: 9th (1999–2000), 9th (2000–01), 3rd (2001–02), 5th (2002–03), 7th (2003–04), 3rd (2004–05), 5th (2005–06).

With Marius Vișan as head coach, Conpet finished the 2006–07 campaign on 7th place.

The 2007–08 season started with Marius Vișan as head coach, but was sacked in the first part of the season, and Decu Crângașu led the team as interim. Silviu Dumitrescu was appointed as head coach in January 2008, leading the club to the 5th place at the end of the season.

The next two seasons saw "the carriers" on top of the league finishing on 3rd place in the 2008–09 and on the 2nd place in the 2009–10 season.

Silviu Dumitrescu left the club in May 2011 with three rounds before the end of the season and Conpet finished the 2010–11 season on the 8th place, with Gheorghe Bărbuceanu as caretaker manager.

Mugur Bolohan was named as the new head coach and "the carriers" finished the 2011–12 season on the 4h place.

Bolohan was replaced in January 2013 with Florin Pârvu and Conpet finished the 2012–13 season in 6th place out of ten in the Series VI.

At the end of the 2013–14 Liga III campaign Conpet finished 2nd in the play-out, 8th in the overall standings, thus remaining in the Third Division, but at the beginning of the next season, due to financial reasons, Conpet withdrew from Liga III and enrolled in the Liga IV – Prahova County.

== Honours ==
Liga III

- Runners-up (1): 2009–10

Liga IV – Prahova County

- Winners (1): 1998–99

Other performances

- Appearances in Liga III: 15

== League history ==
Season	Tier	Division	Place	Notes	Cupa României
2014–15	4	Liga IV (PH)	17th		
2013–14	3	Liga III (Seria VI)	8th	Withdrew	
2012–13	3	Liga III (Seria VI)	6th		
2011–12	3	Liga III (Seria III)	4th		
2010–11	3	Liga III (Seria III)	8th		
2009–10	3	Liga III (Seria III)	2nd		
2008–09	3	Liga III (Seria III)	3rd		
2007–08	3	Liga III (Seria III)	5th		
2006–07	3	Liga III (Seria III)	7th		

Season	Tier	Division	Place	Notes	Cupa României
2005–06	3	Liga III (Seria IV)	5th		
2004–05	3	Liga III (Seria IV)	3rd		
2003–04	3	Liga III (Seria II)	7th		
2002–03	3	Liga III (Seria II)	5th		
2001–02	3	Liga III (Seria II)	3rd		
2000–01	3	Liga III (Seria IV)	9th		
1999–00	3	Liga III (Seria II)	9th		
1998–99	4	Divizia D (PH)	1st (C)	Promoted	
1997–98	4	Divizia D (PH)	3rd		

== Former managers ==
- (Romania) Mihai Mocanu
- (Romania) Valentin Sinescu (2002)
- (Romania) Marius Vișan (2006–2007)
- (Romania) Decu Crângașu (interim) (2007)
- (Romania) Silviu Dumitrescu (2008–2011)
- (Romania) Gheorghe Bărbuceanu (interim) (2011)
- (Romania) Mugur Bolohan (2011–2012)
- (Romania) Romeo Bunică (2012)
- (Romania) Florin Pârvu (2012–2014)
