= Florin Pîrvu =

Romanian footballer

Personal information
- Full name: Florin Cristian Pîrvu
- Date of birth: 2 April 1975 (age 51)
- Place of birth: Ploiești, Romania
- Height: 1.84 m (6 ft 1/2 in)
- Position: Midfielder

Team information
- Current team: Voluntari (head coach)

Youth career
- –1994: Petrolul Ploiești

Senior career*
Years	Team	Apps	(Gls)
1994–1995	Petrolistul Boldești		
1995–1996	Petrolul Ploiești	15	(1)
1997–1998	Henan Construction		
1998–2001	Petrolul Ploiești	76	(13)
2001–2003	Dinamo București	39	(1)
2003	Al-Jahra		
2004	Henan Construction	13	(4)
2004	FC Brașov	14	(0)
2005	Universitatea Craiova	8	(1)
2005–2006	Stal Alchevsk	23	(0)
2006–2007	AEL Limassol	23	(0)
2007	Petrolul Ploiești	15	(1)
2008–2010	Otopeni	65	(4)
2010	Chimia Brazi		
2011	Gaz Metan CFR Craiova	12	(0)
Total		303	(25)

International career
2001	Romania	2	(0)

Managerial career
- 2011–2012: Gaz Metan Severin (assistant)
- 2011: Gaz Metan Severin (caretaker)
- 2012–2014: Conpet Ploiești
- 2014: Petrolul Ploiești (assistant)
- 2015: Rapid București (assistant)
- 2016–2023: Henan Songshan Longmen U19
- 2023–2024: Petrolul Ploiești
- 2024: Voluntari
- 2025–: Voluntari
- * Club domestic league appearances and goals

Florin Cristian Pîrvu (born 2 April 1975) is a Romanian professional football manager and former player who is currently in charge of Liga I club Voluntari.

== Career statistics ==
=== International ===
Appearances and goals by national team and year
National team	Year	Apps	Goals
Romania
Romania	2001	2	0
Total		2	0

== Managerial statistics ==
As of 2 November 2026

Team	From	To	Record							
Team	From	To	G	W	D	L	GF	GA	GD	Win %
(Romania) Gaz Metan Severin	1 November 2011	26 November 2011	4	3	0	1	9	3	+6	75.00
(Romania) Conpet Ploiești	8 October 2012	12 June 2014	54	17	20	17	66	53	+13	31.48
(Romania) Petrolul Ploiești	8 February 2023	9 March 2024	48	16	16	16	50	56	−6	33.33
(Romania) Voluntari	12 March 2024	5 June 2024	11	2	5	4	12	13	−1	18.18
(Romania) Voluntari	25 April 2025	present	58	28	12	18	86	74	+12	48.28
Total			175	66	53	56	223	199	+24	37.71

== Honours ==
=== Player ===
Petrolul Ploiești

- Supercupa României runner-up: 1995

Dinamo București

- Divizia A: 2001–02
- Cupa României: 2002–03
- Supercupa României runner-up: 2001, 2002
