= Stadionul Conpet =

Romanian stadium

- Interactive map of Stadionul Conpet
- Location: Strejnicu, Romania
- Coordinates: 44°55′15″N 25°57′42″E
- Owner: Târgșoru Vechi Municipality
- Operator: Astra II
- Capacity: 1,732
- Surface: Grass

Tenants
- Conpet Ploiești (1968–2015); Petrolul Ploiești (2010–2011); AS Strejnicu (2017–present); Astra II (2018–2021); Prahova Ploiești (2018–2019)

Stadionul Conpet is a multi-purpose stadium, frequently used for football. It is located in Strejnicu, Prahova County. It was occasionally the home ground of Astra II and was the home ground of Conpet. The stadium holds 1,732 people.

During the 2010–11 season, Petrolul Ploiești played their home matches at Conpet Stadium because of the rebuilding of their stadium Ilie Oană.
