= Sergio Uyi =

Italian footballer (born 1993)

Personal information
- Full name: Sergio Osagho Uyi
- Date of birth: 22 June 1993 (age 33)
- Place of birth: Benin City, Nigeria
- Height: 1.92 m (6 ft 4 in)
- Position: Centre-back

Youth career
- 1998–2006: Vanchiglia
- 2006–2011: Canavese
- 2011–2013: Torino

Senior career*
Years	Team	Apps	(Gls)
2014	Dainava	12	(0)
2015	Kruoja	0	(0)
2015	Atlantis FC	10	(1)
2016	SSV Reutlingen		
2017	Bangor City	6	(0)
2017–2018	Senglea Athletic	9	(0)
2018	Al-Hilal (Omdurman)		
2019	Poli Timișoara	13	(0)
2019–2020	Al-Orouba		
2021	Senglea Athletic	9	(0)
2022	Seregno	6	(0)
- * Club domestic league appearances and goals as of 01:58, 6 December 2022 (UTC)

Sergio Osagho Uyi (born 22 June 1993) is a Nigerian-Italian professional footballer who most recently played as a centre-back for Seregno.

== Career ==
In 2006, Uyi joined the youth academy of Italian third tier side Canavese. In 2011, he joined the youth academy of Torino in the Italian Serie A. Before the 2014 season, he signed for Lithuanian club Dainava after trialing for Slavia Prague in the Czech top flight. In 2015, he signed for Finnish third tier team Atlantis FC. Before the second half of 2015–16, he signed for SSV Reutlingen in the German fifth tier. Before the second half of 2016–17, he signed for Welsh outfit Bangor City.

In 2017, Uyi signed for Senglea Athletic in Malta. In 2018, he signed for Sudanese side Al-Hilal (Omdurman), helping them win the league. Before the second half of 2018–19, he signed for Poli Timișoara in Romania. In 2019, Uyi signed for Omani club Al-Orouba. Before the second half of 2020–21, he returned to Senglea Athletic in Malta. Before the second half of 2021–22, he signed for Italian team Seregno after trialing for SLNA in Vietnam. On 13 February 2022, Uyi debuted for Seregno during a 2–1 loss to Padova.
