= Cosmin Lambru =

Romanian footballer

Personal information
- Date of birth: November 26, 1998 (age 27)
- Place of birth: Ploiești, Romania
- Height: 1.80 m (5 ft 11 in)
- Position: Forward

Team information
- Current team: CS Dinamo
- Number: 9

Senior career*
| Years | Team | Apps | (Gls) |
| 2015–2020 | Petrolul Ploiești | 21 | (4) |
| 2016–2017 | → Blejoi (loan) | 19 | (29) |
| 2018–2019 | → Blejoi (loan) | 14 | (16) |
| 2020–2022 | Blejoi | 58 | (39) |
| 2023 | Tunari | 6 | (0) |
| 2024 | Blejoi | 12 | (5) |
| 2024– | CS Dinamo | 10 | (1) |
- * Club domestic league appearances and goals as of 11:58, 21 December 2024 (UTC)

Cosmin Lambru (born 26 November 1998) is a Romanian professional footballer who plays as a forward for CS Dinamo București. He played as a youngster for Petrolul Ploiești youth squad, until he was promoted to the first team. He plays with a prosthetic hand after losing his left hand in a traffic accident as a child.

== Honours ==
Blejoi

- Liga IV – Prahova County: 2018–19
