= Ionuț Țenea =

Romanian footballer

Personal information
- Full name: Ionuț Eugen Țenea
- Date of birth: 21 March 1996 (age 30)
- Place of birth: Ostrov, Romania
- Height: 1.77 m (5 ft 10 in)
- Position: Defender

Youth career
- Dunărea Ostrov

Senior career*
Years	Team	Apps	(Gls)
2014–2015	Dunărea Ostrov		
2015–2024	Dunărea Călărași	166	(4)
2019	→ Aerostar Bacău (loan)	6	(0)
- * Club domestic league appearances and goals as of 16:58, 6 December 2024 (UTC)

Ionuț Eugen Țenea (born 21 March 1996) is a Romanian professional footballer who plays as a defender.

== Honours ==
Dunărea Călărași

- Liga II: 2017–18
