= Mihai Velisar =

Romanian footballer (born 1998)

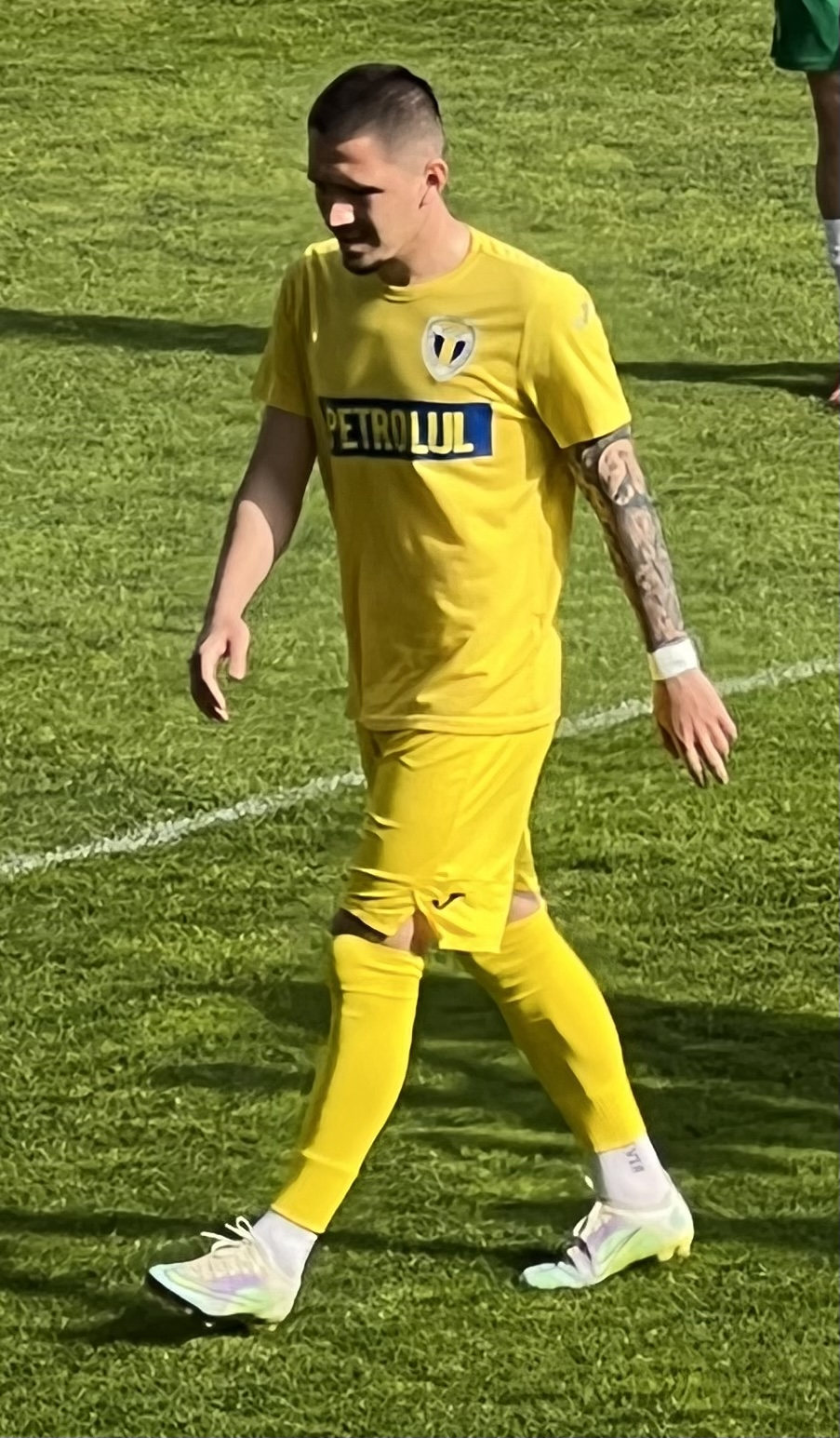
- Velisar with Petrolul Ploiești in 2022

Personal information
- Date of birth: 30 August 1998 (age 28)
- Place of birth: Ploiești, Romania
- Height: 1.76 m (5 ft 9 in)
- Position: Left-back

Team information
- Current team: Bihor Oradea
- Number: 67

Youth career
- –2018: Petrolul Ploiești

Senior career*
Years	Team	Apps	(Gls)
2017–2019	Petrolul Ploiești	4	(0)
2019	→ Gloria Buzău (loan)		
2019	→ Gaz Metan Mediaș (loan)	14	(2)
2019–2022	Gaz Metan Mediaș	59	(0)
2022–2023	Petrolul Ploiești	11	(0)
2023	→ Concordia Chiajna (loan)	7	(0)
2023–2026	Corvinul Hunedoara	59	(2)
2026–	Bihor Oradea	11	(0)

International career
2019	Romania U21	3	(0)
2021	Romania Olympic	2	(0)
- * Club domestic league appearances and goals as of 31 October 2026

Mihai Velisar (born 30 August 1998) is a Romanian professional footballer who plays as a left-back for Liga II club Bihor Oradea.

== Club career ==
=== Petrolul Ploiești and Gloria Buzău loan ===
Velisar made his senior debut for boyhood club Petrolul Ploiești on 24 October 2017, starting in 3–4 penalty shoot-out loss to Mioveni in the Cupa României. It was his only appearance of the season, as his team achieved promotion to the Liga II.

Velisar played in four matches for "the Yellow Wolves" during the first half of the 2018–19 campaign, before returning to the third division on loan with Gloria Buzău in January 2019.

=== Gaz Metan Mediaș ===
Velisar was sent out on loan to Liga I club Gaz Metan Mediaș in the 2019 summer transfer window, and made his debut on 15 July by featuring the full 90 minutes in a 2–2 league draw with Chindia Târgoviște. On 19 August that year, he scored his first goal in a 3–0 win over Voluntari, and six days later netted again in a 4–0 defeat of FCSB.

At the start of November 2019, Velisar signed a permanent contract with Gaz Metan after the latter paid a previously-agreed €15,000 transfer fee to Petrolul Ploiești. He amassed 35 games during his first year in Sibiu County, with the Alb-negrii finishing sixth overall in the league table.

=== Return to Petrolul Ploiești ===
On 10 January 2022, Velisar was re-signed by Petrolul Ploiești amid financial issues at Gaz Metan Mediaș, with his former side retaining 15% interest on a future transfer.

== Career statistics ==
As of match played 31 October 2026

Appearances and goals by club, season and competition
Club	Season	League			Cupa României		Continental		Other		Total	
Club	Season	Division	Apps	Goals	Apps	Goals	Apps	Goals	Apps	Goals	Apps	Goals
Petrolul Ploiești	Liga III	2017–18	0	0	1	0	—		—		1	0
Petrolul Ploiești	Liga II	2018–19	4	0	0	0	—		—		4	0
Petrolul Ploiești	Total		4	0	1	0	—		—		5	0
Gloria Buzău (loan)	Liga III	2018–19	?	?	?	?	—		—		?	?
Gaz Metan Mediaș (loan)	Liga I	2019–20	14	2	0	0	—		—		14	2
Gaz Metan Mediaș	Liga I	2019–20	21	0	—		—		—		21	0
Gaz Metan Mediaș	Liga I	2020–21	28	0	2	0	—		—		30	0
Gaz Metan Mediaș	Liga I	2021–22	10	0	2	0	—		—		12	0
Gaz Metan Mediaș	Total		59	0	4	0	—		—		63	0
Petrolul Ploiești	Liga II	2021–22	6	0	—		—		—		6	0
Petrolul Ploiești	Liga I	2022–23	5	0	3	0	—		—		8	0
Petrolul Ploiești	Total		11	0	3	0	—		—		14	0
Concordia Chiajna (loan)	Liga II	2022–23	7	0	—		—		—		7	0
Corvinul Hunedoara	Liga II	2023–24	26	1	7	0	—		—		33	1
Corvinul Hunedoara	Liga II	2024–25	24	1	1	0	5 (Note: Three appearances in UEFA Europa League, two appearances and one goal in UEFA Conference League)	1	1 (Note: Appearance in Supercupa României)	0	31	2
Corvinul Hunedoara	Liga II	2025–26	9	0	1	0	—		—		10	0
Corvinul Hunedoara	Total		59	2	9	0	5	1	1	0	74	3
Bihor Oradea	Liga II	2026–27	11	0	4	0	—		—		15	0
Career total			165	4	21	0	5	1	1	0	192	5

== Honours ==
Petrolul Ploiești

- Liga II: 2021–22
- Liga III: 2017–18

Gloria Buzău

- Liga III: 2018–19

Corvinul Hunedoara

- Liga II: 2025–26
- Cupa României: 2023–24
- Supercupa României runner-up: 2024
