= FC Astra II =

Romanian football club

Astra II
- Full name: Fotbal Club Astra II
- Short name: Astra II
- Founded: 2013
- Dissolved: 2021
- Ground: Astra / Conpet
- Capacity: 9,000 / 1,732
Home colours	Away colours

Fotbal Club Astra II, commonly known as Astra II Ploiești (Romanian pronunciation: [ˈastra doi ploˈjeʃtʲ]), Astra II Giurgiu, or simply as Astra II, was the reserve squad of Romanian second league side, Astra Giurgiu. The team was founded in 2013 to serve as a "launch pad" to the first team, for the young players from the club's youth center.

== History ==
=== The first Astra II ===
The history of Astra's reserve team began in 2010, when Ioan Niculae, the owner of Astra Ploiești, purchased Dunărea Giurgiu, a club founded in 1963 and competing in Liga II at the time. Following the acquisition, Dunărea was renamed Astra II Giurgiu, becoming the reserve squad of Astra Ploiești. In the summer of 2012, the club was dissolved after the owner decided to reduce expenses.

=== Ploiești-Giurgiu route ===
In September 2012, the first team moved from Ploiești to Giurgiu and was renamed Astra Giurgiu. The relocation applied only to official matches, while the youth academy and training sessions remained in Ploiești. Meanwhile, the reserve team, Astra Ploiești III, competed in Liga IV – Prahova County.

During the 2012–13 season, the reserve team established its camp in Ciorani, Prahova County, approximately 40 km from Ploiești, and was renamed Astra II Ciorani through the involvement of the local municipality and businessman Ion Mihai. The team attempted to avoid relegation with the help of former top-division players who had previously played for Petrolul Ploiești – Laurențiu Dumitru, Florin Pancovici, and Valentin Iordache – along with Valeriu Aristan, serving as player-coach. Later in the season, Adrian Peiu took over as head coach in April 2013, guiding the team to a 13th-place finish.

Astra II achieved promotion to Liga III at the end of the 2013–14 season under Valeriu Aristan's leadership, after winning the Prahova County title and the promotion play-off against FC Aninoasa, the Liga IV – Dâmbovița County champions. The squad for the decisive match comprised A. Catană – R. Catană, I. Neagu, Iordache, Zegheru – Bărăgan (cpt) – Petculescu (61’ Chiși), Butufei, Munteanu (83’ Răileanu), Petrescu (51’ Aristan) – Ciobanu.

After the promotion Astra II moved to Ploiești, on the Astra Stadium and started to be known as Astra II Ploiești, even if in some situations media refers to the team, as Astra II Giurgiu, due to name of the mother club, Astra Giurgiu. In the Liga III Astra II finished last in the first season and relegated. After one season in the fourth league, where it finished 9th of 16, Astra II entered back in the Liga III at the start of the 2016–17 Liga III season, taking advantage of the new rule through which the first league teams could enroll their reserve squads directly in the third tier. Further, with managers such as Constantin Schumacher, Marius Măldărășanu or Adrian Senin, Astra II obtained comfortable results: 10th (2016–17) and 4th (2017–18).

During the 2017–18 season, Astra II had the opportunity to bring back to life the Ploiești derby, against Petrolul Ploiești. The matches ended with two draws, 0–0 on Ilie Oană Stadium and 2–2 on Astra Stadium.

== Grounds ==
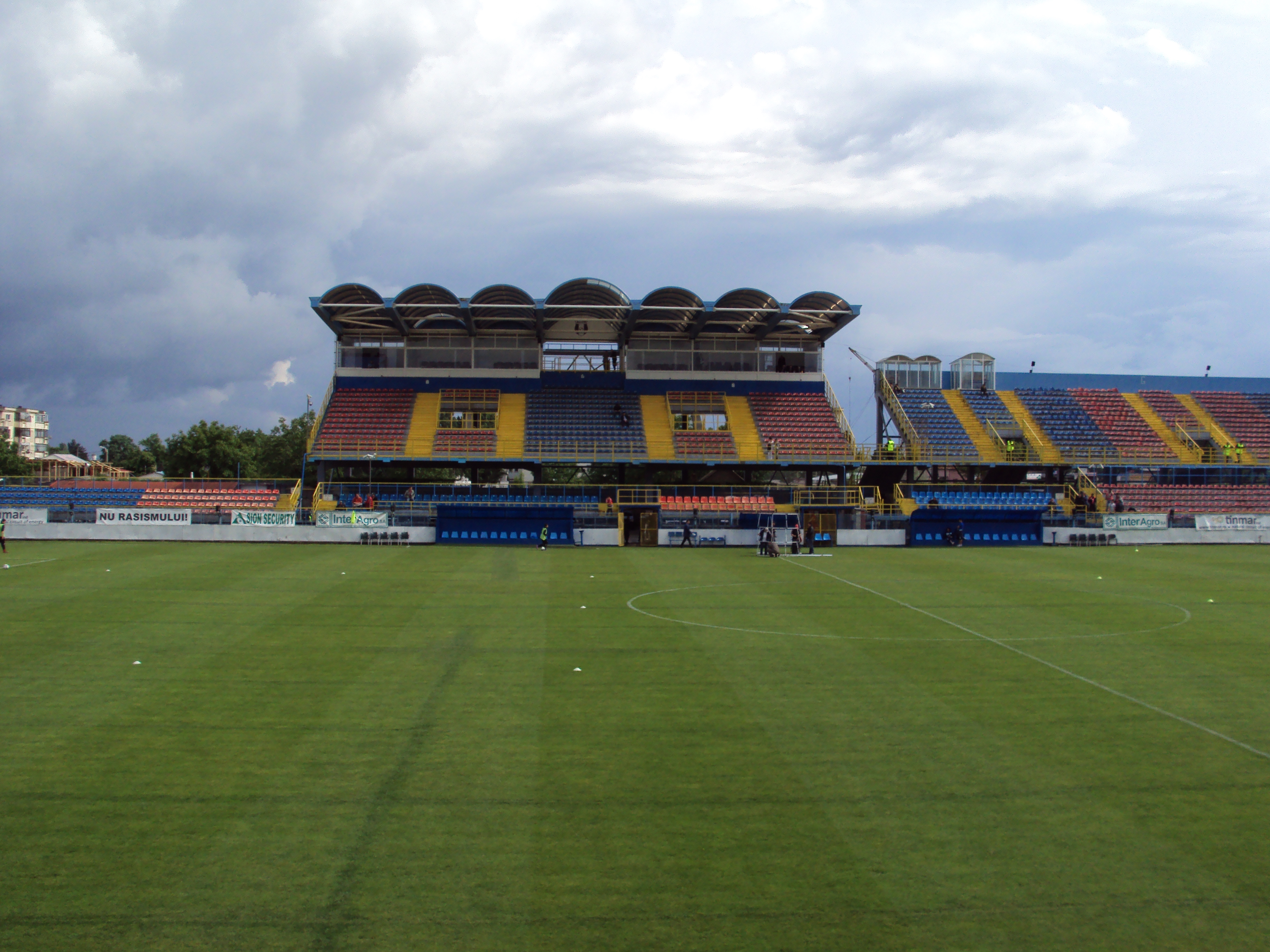
Astra Stadium, former home ground of Astra Giurgiu and current home ground of Astra II.

=== Stadionul Marin Anastasovici ===
In 2010, when the first reserve squad was founded, it played the home matches on Marin Anastasovici Stadium in Giurgiu, Giurgiu County. From 2012 on this stadium plays its home matches the first squad of the football club, Astra Giurgiu.

=== Stadionul Ionuț Trandafir ===
In 2013, after the re-foundation, in the current format, Astra II started to play its home matches on Ionuț Trandafir Stadium in Ciorani, Prahova County, with a capacity of 1,500 seats.

=== Stadionul Astra ===
In 2014 after the promotion to Liga III, Astra II moved its home matches on Astra Stadium in Ploiești, Prahova County, the former stadium of the mother club, Astra Giurgiu. Astra Stadium has a capacity of 9,000 seats and is still used also by the first squad for training.

=== Stadionul Conpet ===
In the autumn of 2018, Astra II started to play some home matches on Conpet Stadium in Strejnicu, with a capacity of 1,732 seats.

== Honours ==
=== Leagues ===
- Liga IV – Prahova County
  - Winners (1): 2013–14

=== Cups ===
- Cupa României – Prahova County
  - Winners (1): 2013–14

== League and Cup history ==
Season	Tier	Division	Place	Notes	Cupa României
2020–21	3	Liga III (Seria V)	5th	Withdrew	
2019–20	3	Liga III (Seria III)	13th		
2018–19	3	Liga III (Seria III)	12th		
2017–18	3	Liga III (Seria III)	4th		
2016–17	3	Liga III (Seria II)	10th		

Season	Tier	Division	Place	Notes	Cupa României
2015–16	4	Liga IV (PH)	9th		
2014–15	3	Liga III (Seria III)	14th	Relegated	
2013–14	4	Liga IV (PH)	1st (C)	Promoted	
2012–13	4	Liga IV (PH)	13th		

== Former managers ==
- (Romania) Constantin Schumacher (2015)
- (Romania) Marius Măldărășanu (2016–2018)
- (Romania) Adrian Senin (2018–2019)
