= Radu Bîrzan =

Romanian footballer

Personal information
- Full name: Radu Nicolae Bîrzan
- Date of birth: 12 September 1999 (age 27)
- Place of birth: Băbeni, Romania
- Height: 1.75 m (5 ft 9 in)
- Position: Midfielder

Team information
- Current team: Viitorul Dăești
- Number: 14

Youth career
- Universitatea Craiova

Senior career*
| Years | Team | Apps | (Gls) |
| 2016–2017 | Universitatea II Craiova | 12 | (0) |
| 2017–2020 | Universitatea Craiova | 2 | (0) |
| 2017–2018 | → Argeș Pitești (loan) | 9 | (0) |
| 2019–2020 | → Universitatea II Craiova | 8 | (0) |
| 2019–2020 | → Cetate Deva | 13 | (0) |
| 2020–2021 | Deva | 14 | (1) |
| 2021–2022 | Flacăra Horezu | 25 | (4) |
| 2022–2023 | Viitorul Dăești | 8 | (0) |
| 2023–2024 | Râmnicu Vâlcea | 10 | (0) |
| 2024– | Viitorul Dăești | 0 | (0) |
- * Club domestic league appearances and goals as of 08:35, 12 November 2024 (UTC)

Radu Nicolae Bîrzan (born 12 September 1999) is a professional Romanian football midfielder for Viitorul Dăești.

He made his senior league debut for Universitatea Craiova on 30 April 2017 in a Liga I 3–0 away win at CFR Cluj.
