= Alexandru Ciocâlteu =

Romanian footballer

Personal information
- Full name: Alexandru Cristian Ciocâlteu
- Date of birth: 16 April 1990 (age 36)
- Place of birth: Sinaia, Romania
- Height: 1.79 m (5 ft 10 in)
- Position: Midfielder

Senior career*
Years	Team	Apps	(Gls)
2009–2011	Tricolorul Breaza	11	(0)
2012	Conpet Ploiești		
2012–2013	CF Brăila	33	(9)
2014–2015	FC Brașov	18	(0)
2015	Racing Beirut	1	(0)
2016	ASIL Lysi	8	(3)
2016–2017	Dunărea Călărași	28	(4)
2017–2018	Petrolul Ploiești	30	(6)
2019	Aerostar Bacău	17	(3)
2019–2021	Metaloglobus București	36	(1)
2021–2023	1599 Șelimbăr	40	(7)
2023–2024	CSM Slatina	24	(2)
2024–2025	SR Brașov	13	(3)
- * Club domestic league appearances and goals as of 18:19, 27 December 2024 (UTC)

Alexandru Cristian Ciocâlteu (born 16 April 1990) is a Romanian professional footballer who plays as a midfielder for SR Brașov.

== Honours ==
Petrolul Ploiești

- Liga III: 2017–18
