= Antoniu Manolache =

Romanian footballer (born 2000)

Personal information
- Full name: Antoniu Ştefăniță Manolache
- Date of birth: 30 January 2000 (age 26)
- Place of birth: Urziceni, Romania
- Height: 1.92 m (6 ft 4 in)
- Position: Defender

Team information
- Current team: Corvinul Hunedoara
- Number: 30

Youth career
- Înfrățirea Jilavele
- Petrolul Ploiești
- –2017: Centrul Naţional de Pregătire Timişoara
- 2017–2019: Groningen

Senior career*
Years	Team	Apps	(Gls)
2019	ACS Poli Timișoara	12	(0)
2019–2023	Petrolul Ploiești	38	(1)
2022	→ CSM Reșița (loan)		
2022–2023	→ Gloria Bistrița (loan)		
2023–	Corvinul Hunedoara	95	(12)

International career
2016	Romania U15	2	(0)
2016	Romania U16	3	(0)
2016–2017	Romania U17	3	(0)
2017	Romania U18	1	(0)
2018–2019	Romania U19	6	(1)
- * Club domestic league appearances and goals as of 7 November 2026

Antoniu Ştefăniță Manolache (born 30 January 2000) is a Romanian professional footballer who plays as a defender for Liga I club Corvinul Hunedoara.

== Honours ==
CSM Reșița

- Liga III: 2021–22

Corvinul Hunedoara

- Liga II: 2025–26
- Liga III: 2021–22, 2022–23
- Cupa României: 2023–24
- Supercupa României runner-up: 2024
