= Sergiu Arnăutu =

Romanian footballer

Personal information
- Full name: Sergiu Neculai Arnăutu
- Date of birth: 27 May 1990 (age 36)
- Place of birth: Vălenii de Munte, Romania
- Height: 1.87 m (6 ft 2 in)
- Position: Striker

Youth career
- 2002–2007: Petrolul Ploieşti

Senior career*
Years	Team	Apps	(Gls)
2008–2009	Petrolul Ploieşti	16	(2)
2009–2012	Chimia Brazi	67	(31)
2012–2013	Turnu Severin	8	(1)
2013	→ Mioveni (loan)	11	(1)
2013	Râmnicu Vâlcea	13	(2)
2014	FC Tiraspol	3	(0)
2014–2015	Juventus București	29	(14)
2015	FCM Baia Mare	14	(7)
2016–2017	Luceafărul Oradea	44	(20)
2017–2020	Petrolul Ploiești	84	(45)
2020–2021	Concordia Chiajna	15	(4)
2021	→ Petrolul Ploiești (loan)	9	(0)
2021–2022	Corvinul Hunedoara	27	(12)
2022	Focșani	15	(15)
2023–2024	Metalul Buzău	25	(17)
- * Club domestic league appearances and goals as of 09:46, 9 January 2024 (UTC)

Sergiu Arnăutu (born 27 May 1990) is a Romanian footballer who plays as a striker for Metalul Buzău.

== Career ==
=== Early career ===
As a youngster he made a name for himself on the fields of FC Petrolul Ploiesti. In 2008, he made his first professional appearance in Liga II.

=== CFR Cluj's dream ===
In July 2015, after a good season with CS Juventus Bucuresti in Liga III, where finished 2nd, Sergiu was close to be transferred to CFR Cluj where his ex-coach Eugen Trica was appointed. The transfer was broken down because of financial problems of CFR's.

== Honours ==
Luceafărul Oradea

- Liga III: 2015–16

Petrolul Ploiești

- Liga III: 2017–18

CS Hunedoara

- Liga III: 2021–22
