= Jean Prunescu =

Romanian footballer

Personal information
- Date of birth: 6 July 1989 (age 37)
- Place of birth: Bucharest, Romania
- Height: 1.85 m (6 ft 1 in)
- Position: Centre back

Youth career
- 1999–2007: Steaua București

Senior career*
Years	Team	Apps	(Gls)
2007–2011	Steaua II București	0	(0)
2008–2009	→ Gloria Buzău (loan)	3	(0)
2011–2012	Astra II Giurgiu	5	(0)
2013–2015	Inter Clinceni		
2015–2016	Voința Snagov		
2016–2019	Petrolul Ploiești	16	(3)
2019	→ Dacia Unirea Brăila (loan)	10	(0)
2019–2020	Minaur Baia Mare	23	(0)
- * Club domestic league appearances and goals as of 31 March 2021

Jean Prunescu (born 6 July 1989) is a Romanian football player who plays as a defender. In the 2008–09 season, Prunescu played three games in Liga I while on loan to Gloria Buzău.

== Notes ==
^1 2007–2008 and 2008–2009 Liga III appearances and goals made for Steaua II București are unavailable.
