= Astra Stadium =

Football stadium in Romania

- Columbia (Colombia)
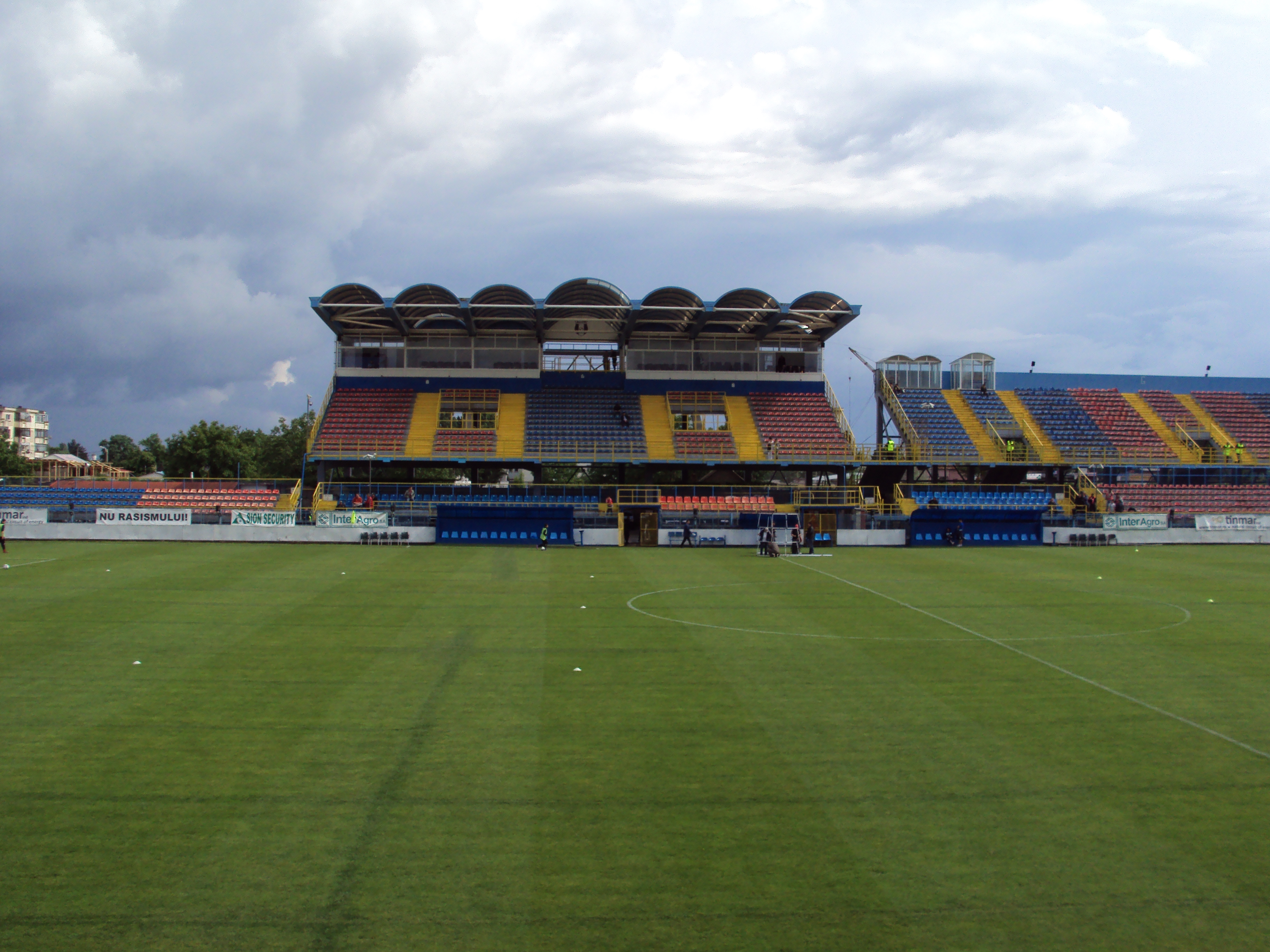
- The stadium in 2010
- Interactive map of Astra Stadium
- Address: Str. Sondelor, nr. 19A
- Location: Ploiești, Romania
- Coordinates: 44°55′42.40″N 26°00′12.30″E
- Owner: Ioan Niculae
- Capacity: 9,000 seated
- Surface: Grass

Construction
- Opened: 1934
- Renovated: 2009
- Expanded: 2009

Tenants
- Astra Ploiești (1934–2012); Astra II (2014–2021)

The Astra Stadium is a football-only stadium in Ploiești, Romania. It was the home ground of Astra Giurgiu, former Astra Ploiești, club that moved in 2012 from Ploiești to Giurgiu.

== Association football ==
International football matches
Date	Competition	Home	Away	Score	Attendance
6 September 2003	UEFA Euro 2004 qualifying	Romania	Luxembourg	4 - 0	2,457

== See also ==
- List of football stadiums in Romania
