= Claudiu Tudor =

Romanian professional footballer

Personal information
- Full name: Claudiu Dorin Tudor
- Date of birth: 29 April 1985 (age 41)
- Place of birth: Ploiești, Romania
- Height: 1.78 m (5 ft 10 in)
- Position: Winger

Team information
- Current team: Petrolul Ploiești (president)

Youth career
- –2001: Petrolul Ploiești

Senior career*
Years	Team	Apps	(Gls)
2001–2002	Petrolul Ploiești	4	(0)
2002–2008	FC Universitatea Craiova	6	(0)
2004–2005	→ Sheriff Tiraspol (loan)	0	(0)
2005–2008	→ Juventus București (loan)	58	(28)
2008–2011	Astra Ploiești	31	(3)
2011	→ Studențesc Iași (loan)	12	(2)
2011–2013	Studențesc Iași	58	(4)
2013–2014	SC Bacău	35	(3)
2015	UTA Arad	29	(9)
2015	Afumați		
2016	Voința Snagov	8	(2)
2016–2018	Petrolul Ploiești	30	(10)
Total		271	(61)

International career
2001	Romania U17	2	(0)
2003	Romania U19	3	(0)

Managerial career
- 2021–2022: Petrolul Ploiești (sporting director)
- 2023–: Petrolul Ploiești (president)
- * Club domestic league appearances and goals as of 27 May 2018

Claudiu Dorin Tudor (born 29 April 1985) is a Romanian retired footballer who is the president of Liga I club Petrolul Ploiești.

He played as a midfielder for teams such as Petrolul Ploiești, FC Universitatea Craiova, Juventus București, Astra Ploiești or Studențesc Iași, among others.

== Career ==
=== Petrolul Ploiești ===
Claudiu Tudor made his debut in Divizia B at the age of just 17 for Petrolul Ploiești.

=== Universitatea Craiova ===
In 2002, he moved to Universitatea Craiova. Not making an impact, he was loaned to Sheriff Tiraspol and Juventus București.

=== Astra Ploiești ===
He moved to Astra Ploiești in 2009 and helped them gain promotion to the liga I. Later that year he damaged his Achilles tendon and was sidelined for almost a year due to that injury.

=== Politehnica Iași ===
In January 2011 he moved to Politehnica Iași, becoming captain of the team after just six months. At the end of the 11–12 season, CSMS Iași gained promotion to the Liga I, as Tudor scored three goals from 27 games.

== Honours ==
Sheriff Tiraspol

- Divizia Națională: 2004–05
- Moldovan Super Cup: 2004

Studențesc Iași

- Liga II: 2011–12

UTA Arad

- Liga III: 2014–15

Petrolul Ploiești

- Liga III: 2017–18
- Liga IV – Prahova County: 2016–17
