= Târgșoru Vechi =

- Commune
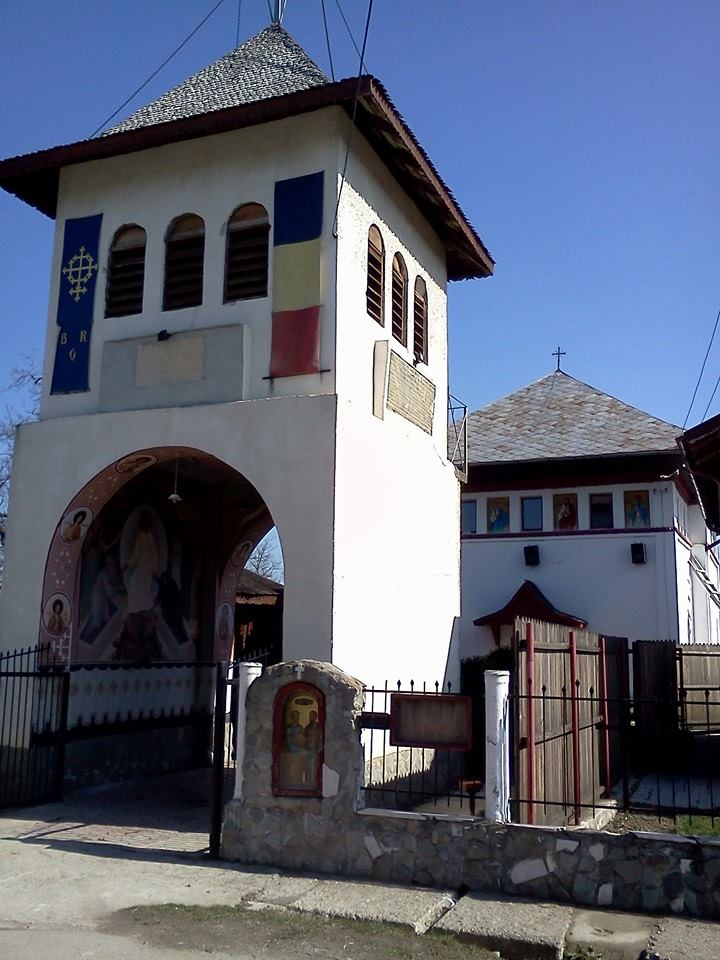
- Church in Stăncești

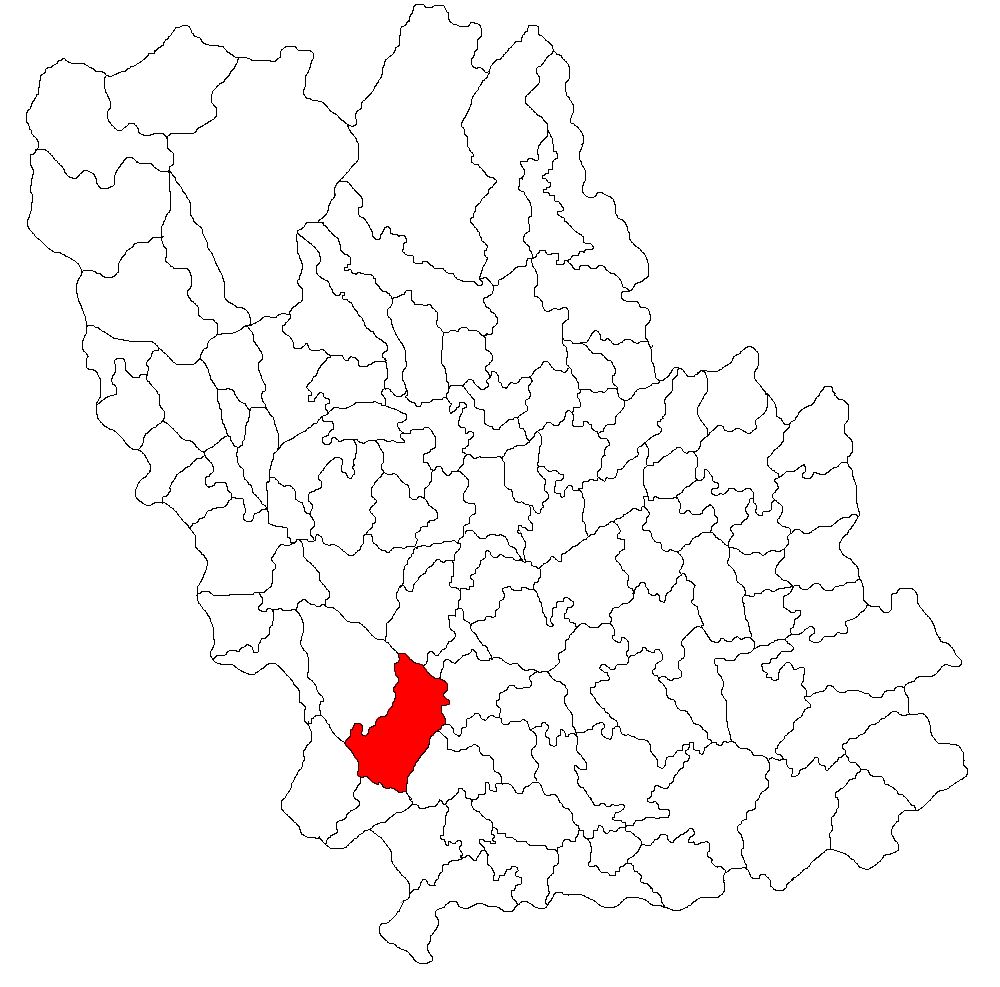
- Location in Prahova County

- Location in Romania
- Coordinates: 44°53′N 25°55′E
- Country: Romania
- County: Prahova

Government
  - Mayor (2020–2024): Nicolae Drăgan (PNL)
- Area: 48.43 km^{2} (18.70 sq mi)
- Elevation: 174 m (571 ft)
- Population (2021-12-01): 10,434
  - Density: 215.4/km^{2} (558.0/sq mi)
- Time zone: UTC+02:00 (EET)
  - Summer (DST): UTC+03:00 (EEST)
- Postal code: 107590
- Area code: +(40) 244
- Vehicle reg.: PH
- Website: www.comunatirgsoruvechi.ro

Târgșoru Vechi is a commune in Prahova County, Muntenia, Romania. It is composed of four villages: Stăncești, Strejnicu (commune seat), Târgșoru Vechi, and Zahanaua.

There is an aerodrome for general aviation in Strejnicu, mostly used by Aeroclubul României. On its site was located the medieval former town of Târgșor.

Strejnicu village is the assassination site of historian and politician Nicolae Iorga, who was killed on November 27, 1940 by an Iron Guard squad.

Historical population
Year	Pop.	±%
1992	7,995	—
2002	8,599	+7.6%
2011	9,117	+6.0%
2021	10,434	+14.4%
Source: Census data
