= List of Romanian football transfers winter 2017–18 =

This is a list of Romanian football transfers for the 2017–18 winter transfer window. Only moves featuring 2017–18 Liga I and 2017–18 Liga II are listed.

== Liga I ==
=== ACS Poli Timișoara ===
In:

No.	Pos.	Nation	Player
—	DF	ROU	Ionuț Murariu (loan return from Ghiroda)
—	MF	ROU	Sebastian Velcotă (loan return from CSMȘ Reșița)
—	DF	ROU	Iulian Carabela (from Juventus București)
—	DF	GEO	Akaki Khubutia (from Gaz Metan Mediaș)
—	DF	ROU	George Neagu (from Free agent)
—	DF	ARG	Maximiliano Oliva (on loan from Dinamo București)
—	DF	ROU	Răzvan Raț (from Free agent)
—	MF	ROU	Andrei Enescu (from (Cyprus) Ethnikos Achna)
—	MF	ROU	Adrian Zaluschi (on loan from Ripensia Timișoara)
—	FW	TOG	Camaldine Abraw (from Free agent)
—	FW	ARG	Esteban Ciaccheri (on loan from (Chile) Rangers de Talca, previously on loan at Botoșani)
—	FW	ROU	Alexandru Popovici (from (Azerbaijan) Sabail)
—	FW	ROU	Mihai Roman (on loan from CS U Craiova)

Out:

No.	Pos.	Nation	Player
—	GK	ROU	Mario Contra (on loan to Ripensia Timișoara, previously on loan at Ghiroda)
—	DF	ROU	Cristian Bocșan (on loan to Ripensia Timișoara)
—	DF	ROU	Valentin Crețu (to Gaz Metan Mediaș)
—	DF	ROU	George Neagu (to Free agent)
—	DF	ROU	Cristian Podină (on loan to CSMȘ Reșița)
—	DF	CRO	Josip Šoljić (to (Poland) Stal Mielec)
—	MF	ROU	Darius Buia (to UTA Arad, previously on loan at Gloria L.T. Cermei)
—	MF	CRO	Ivan Ćurjurić (to (Cyprus) Enosis Neon Paralimni)
—	MF	ROU	Cătălin Doman (on loan to Dunărea Călărași)
—	MF	ROU	Sebastian Mailat (to CFR Cluj)
—	FW	TOG	Camaldine Abraw (to (South Africa) AmaZulu)
—	FW	BRA	Miguel Bianconi (to (Brazil) Bragantino)

=== Astra Giurgiu ===
In:

No.	Pos.	Nation	Player
—	DF	ROU	Andrei Roman (loan return from Metaloglobus București)
—	DF	USA	Danny Barbir (from (Canada) Whitecaps FC 2)
—	MF	ROU	Vlad Bărbulescu (on loan from Viitorul Domnești)
—	MF	ROU	Laurențiu Buș (from Botoșani)
—	MF	ROU	Florentin Matei (on loan from (Croatia) Rijeka)
—	FW	ESP	Urko Vera (on loan from CFR Cluj)

Out:

No.	Pos.	Nation	Player
—	DF	ROU	Alin Bărîcă (on loan to Luceafărul Oradea)
—	MF	ROU	Alexandru Ioniță (to CFR Cluj)
—	MF	ROU	Viorel Nicoară (on loan to Juventus București)
—	FW	TOG	Serge Nyuiadzi (loan return to (Lithuania) Žalgiris)
—	FW	FRA	Anthony Le Tallec (to (France) Orléans)
—	FW	BRA	Marquinhos (to (Lithuania) Žalgiris)

=== Botoșani ===
In:

No.	Pos.	Nation	Player
—	DF	ROU	Florin Acsinte (from Voluntari)
—	MF	ROU	Vlad Achim (on loan from Steaua București)
—	MF	ROU	Cătălin Golofca (on loan from Steaua București)
—	FW	ROU	Mircea Axente (from (Saudi Arabia) Al-Faisaly)
—	FW	BIH	Bojan Golubović (from Gaz Metan Mediaș)
—	FW	KSA	Naif Hazazi (from Free agent)

Out:

No.	Pos.	Nation	Player
—	FW	ARG	Esteban Ciaccheri (loan return to (Chile) Rangers de Talca, later on loan to Poli Timișoara)
—	FW	ROU	Daniel Popa (loan return to Dinamo București)
—	GK	ROU	Raul Avram (to Petrolul Ploiești, previously on loan at Știința Miroslava)
—	DF	ROU	Claudiu Juncănaru (on loan to CSM Roman, previously on loan at Farul Constanța)
—	MF	ROU	Mihai Bordeianu (to CFR Cluj)
—	MF	ROU	Laurențiu Buș (to Astra Giurgiu)
—	MF	ROU	Marian Târșă (on loan to Academica Clinceni)
—	FW	ROU	Róbert Elek (to Juventus București)
—	FW	NGR	Benjamin Kuku (to Sepsi Sfântu Gheorghe)
—	FW	ROU	Alexandru Târnovan (to Hermannstadt)

=== CFR Cluj ===
In:

No.	Pos.	Nation	Player
—	MF	ROU	Cosmin Sârbu (loan return from Târgu Mureș)
—	DF	BRA	Gilvan (from (Brazil) Atlético Goianiense)
—	MF	ROU	Mihai Bordeianu (from Botoșani)
—	MF	ROU	Valentin Costache (from Dinamo București)
—	MF	ROU	Alexandru Ioniță (from Astra Giurgiu)
—	MF	ROU	Sebastian Mailat (from Poli Timișoara)
—	FW	ROU	Gabriel Dodoi (from Pandurii Târgu Jiu)
—	FW	ROU	George Țucudean (from Viitorul Constanța)

Out:

No.	Pos.	Nation	Player
—	GK	ROU	Horațiu Moldovan (on loan to Voința Turnu Măgurele, previously on loan to Hermannstadt)
—	MF	ROU	Alexandru Chiriță (to Sepsi Sfântu Gheorghe)
—	MF	ROU	Yasin Hamed (to Sepsi Sfântu Gheorghe)
—	MF	POR	Thierry Moutinho (on loan to (Spain) Cultural Leonesa)
—	MF	ROU	Dan Nistor (to Dinamo București)
—	FW	CRO	Dino Špehar (on loan to Dunărea Călărași, previously on loan at Concordia Chiajna)
—	FW	ESP	Urko Vera (on loan to Astra Giurgiu)

=== Concordia Chiajna ===
In:

No.	Pos.	Nation	Player
—	GK	LTU	Armantas Vitkauskas (from (Lithuania) Žalgiris)
—	DF	ROU	Dan Panait (on loan from Viitorul Constanța, previously on loan at Târgu Mureș)
—	MF	CPV	Nivaldo (from Free agent)
—	MF	ROU	Andrei Prepeliță (from Free agent)
—	FW	ROU	Florin Cioablă (from Viitorul Constanța)

Out:

No.	Pos.	Nation	Player
—	FW	CRO	Dino Špehar (loan return to CFR Cluj, later on loan to Dunărea Călărași)
—	GK	ROU	Cristian Bălgrădean (to Steaua București)
—	GK	ROU	George Isvoranu (on loan to Voința Turnu Măgurele)
—	DF	ROU	Robert Bolozan (to Balotești)
—	DF	ROU	Bogdan Bucurică (to Voluntari)
—	DF	ROU	Alin Dobrosavlevici (on loan to Dunărea Călărași)
—	DF	ROU	Claudiu Săftescu (to Metaloglobus București)
—	MF	ROU	Cristian Ciobanu (on loan to Juventus București)
—	MF	ROU	Vasile Gheorghe (on loan to Juventus București)
—	MF	NED	Romario Kortzorg (to (Vietnam) Becamex Bình Dương)
—	MF	ROU	Cristian Novacek (on loan to Afumați)
—	MF	ROU	Florin Răsdan (to CSA Steaua București)
—	MF	ROU	Daniel Rogoveanu (to Chindia Târgoviște)
—	FW	ROU	Robert Răducanu (on loan to Viitorul Constanța)

=== CS U Craiova ===
In:

No.	Pos.	Nation	Player
—	FW	ROU	Simon Măzărache (loan return from Juventus București)
—	DF	ROU	Florin Gardoș (on loan from (England) Southampton)
—	DF	ROU	Răzvan Popa (from Free agent)
—	MF	ROU	Ovidiu Bic (from Gaz Metan Mediaș)
—	MF	ROU	Alexandru Mitriță (from (Italy) Pescara, previously on loan)
—	MF	POR	André Santos (on loan from (Portugal) Arouca)
—	FW	CRO	Dominik Glavina (from Free agent)

Out:

No.	Pos.	Nation	Player
—	DF	ROU	Robert Bogdan (to Juventus București)
—	DF	CRO	Niko Datković (loan return to (Italy) Spezia, later signed by (Poland) Cracovia)
—	DF	ROU	Robert Petre (on loan to Șirineasa)
—	DF	CRO	Hrvoje Spahija (on loan to (Kazakhstan) Ordabasy)
—	DF	ROU	Sorin Sima (on loan to Dacia Unirea Brăila)
—	MF	ROU	Stephan Drăghici (on loan to Juventus București, previously on loan at Academica Clinceni)
—	MF	ROU	Paul Hodea (to Hermannstadt)
—	MF	ROU	Angelo Iuga (to UTA Arad)
—	MF	ROU	Alin Manea (on loan to Dacia Unirea Brăila, previously on loan at Sportul Snagov)
—	FW	ROU	Răzvan Gunie (to Șirineasa)
—	FW	ROU	Sergiu Jurj (on loan to Chindia Târgoviște, previously on loan at Olimpia Satu Mare)
—	FW	ROU	Alexandru Popescu (on loan to Academica Clinceni)
—	FW	ROU	Mihai Roman (on loan to Poli Timișoara)

=== CSM Politehnica Iași ===
In:

No.	Pos.	Nation	Player
—	GK	MDA	Denis Rusu (from (Moldova) Zimbru Chișinău)
—	DF	LBA	Sadiq El Fitouri (from (Libya) Al Ahli Tripoli)
—	DF	LAT	Vitālijs Jagodinskis (from Free agent)
—	MF	ROU	Bogdan Gavrilă (from (Cyprus) Ethnikos Achna)
—	MF	ROU	Mădălin Mihăescu (from Juventus București)
—	MF	ROU	Alexandru Taciuc (from Știința Miroslava)
—	MF	ROU	Alexandru Zaharia (from Juventus București)

Out:

No.	Pos.	Nation	Player
—	GK	ROU	Teodor Axinte (on loan to Voința Turnu Măgurele)
—	GK	ROU	Ștefan Târnovanu (on loan to Știința Miroslava)
—	DF	CPV	Tiago Almeida (to (Portugal) União Madeira)
—	DF	ROU	Andu Moisi (on loan to Știința Miroslava)
—	DF	LBA	Sadiq El Fitouri (to Free agent)
—	MF	MDA	Danu Spătaru (to (Russia) Olimpiyets Nizhny Novgorod)
—	MF	MDA	Alexandru Vremea (to (Moldova) Petrocub Hîncești)
—	MF	ROU	Alexandru Taciuc (on loan to Știința Miroslava)
—	FW	ROU	Adrian Moldovan (on loan to Academica Clinceni)

=== Dinamo București ===
In:

No.	Pos.	Nation	Player
—	DF	ROU	Vlad Olteanu (loan return from Voluntari)
—	DF	ROU	Mihai Popescu (loan return from Voluntari)
—	MF	ROU	Patrick Petre (loan return from Sepsi Sfântu Gheorghe)
—	DF	GER	Marco Ehmann (from (Germany) Karlsruher SC)
—	MF	ESP	Aitor Monroy (from Free agent)
—	MF	ROU	Dan Nistor (from CFR Cluj)
—	MF	CRO	Antun Palić (from (Belgium) Excel Mouscron)
—	MF	ROU	Gabriel Torje (on loan from (Russia) Akhmat Grozny, previously on loan at (Turkey) Karabükspor)
—	FW	ROU	Daniel Popa (loan return from Botoșani)
—	MF	CRO	Ivan Pešić (from (Croatia) Hajduk Split)

Out:

No.	Pos.	Nation	Player
—	FW	COD	Jeremy Bokila (loan return to (Turkey) Akhisar Belediyespor)
—	GK	ROU	Alexandru Burci (on loan to Metaloglobus București, previously on loan at Atletic Bradu)
—	GK	ROU	Adrian Gherasim (to Metaloglobus București)
—	GK	ROU	Mihai Eșanu (on loan to Balotești)
—	DF	ROU	Steliano Filip (to (Croatia) Hajduk Split)
—	DF	ROU	Petre Giuga (to Național Sebiș, previously on loan at Șirineasa)
—	DF	ROU	Daniel Groza (to Hermannstadt, previously on loan at Academica Clinceni)
—	DF	ROU	Ionuț Nedelcearu (to (Russia) FC Ufa)
—	DF	ARG	Maximiliano Oliva (to ACS Poli Timișoara)
—	MF	ROU	Paul Anton (to (Russia) Anzhi Makhachkala)
—	MF	ROU	Valentin Costache (to CFR Cluj)
—	MF	POR	Filipe Nascimento (to (Bulgaria) Levski Sofia)
—	MF	ROU	Mihnea Vlad (on loan to Oțelul Galați)
—	FW	BRA	Rivaldinho (to (Bulgaria) Levski Sofia)

=== Gaz Metan Mediaș ===
In:

No.	Pos.	Nation	Player
—	DF	ROU	Valentin Crețu (from ACS Poli Timișoara)
—	DF	POR	João Diogo (from (Portugal) Belenenses)
—	DF	GRE	Sokratis Fytanidis (from Free agent)
—	DF	ROU	Paul Pîrvulescu (from (Poland) Wisła Płock)
—	DF	ROU	Tamás Szasz (from Olimpia Satu Mare)
—	MF	POR	David Caiado (from (Spain) Ponferradina)
—	MF	GRE	Alexander Fioretos (from Free agent)
—	MF	POR	Diogo Rosado (from (Angola) 1º Agosto)
—	FW	POR	Edinho Júnior (from (Portugal) Almancilense)
—	FW	CPV	Ely (from (Portugal) Pinhalnovense)
—	FW	VEN	Mario Rondón (from Free agent)

Out:

No.	Pos.	Nation	Player
—	GK	ROU	Sebastian Ciuperceanu (on loan to Unirea Alba Iulia)
—	DF	GEO	Akaki Khubutia (to Poli Timișoara)
—	DF	ROU	Andrei Pleșa (to Oltenița)
—	DF	CRO	Filip Žderić (to (Albania) Kukësi)
—	MF	ROU	Ovidiu Bic (to CS U Craiova)
—	MF	ROU	Alexandru Curtean (to Hermannstadt)
—	MF	ROU	Cristian Danci (to Hermannstadt)
—	MF	ROU	Raul Ignat (to Unirea Alba Iulia)
—	MF	POR	Paulo Jorge (to (Portugal) Trofense)
—	MF	ROU	Olivian Surugiu (to Hermannstadt)
—	FW	NED	Emmerik De Vriese (to (Cyprus) Xylotymbou)
—	FW	BIH	Bojan Golubović (to Botoșani)
—	FW	ALB	Fabian Lokaj (to (Germany) Schwarz-Weiß Rehden)

=== Juventus București ===
In:

No.	Pos.	Nation	Player
—	GK	ROU	George Gavrilaș (on loan from Voluntari)
—	DF	ROU	Robert Bogdan (from CS U Craiova)
—	DF	ROU	Cornel Ene (from Free agent)
—	DF	TUR	Gökhan Kardes (on loan from (Netherlands) PSV Eindhoven)
—	DF	ROU	Mihai Leca (from (Moldova) Zimbru Chișinău)
—	DF	ROU	Dan Popescu (from Steaua București)
—	DF	ROU	Gabriel Simion (on loan from Steaua București, previously on loan at Academica Clinceni)
—	MF	FRA	Charles Acolatse (on loan from Foresta Suceava)
—	MF	ROU	Cristian Balgiu (on loan from Academica Clinceni)
—	MF	ROU	Cristian Ciobanu (on loan from Concordia Chiajna)
—	MF	ROU	Marian Constantinescu (from Academica Clinceni)
—	MF	ROU	Stephan Drăghici (on loan from CS U Craiova, previously on loan at Academica Clinceni)
—	MF	ROU	Vasile Gheorghe (on loan from Concordia Chiajna)
—	MF	ROU	Viorel Nicoară (on loan from Astra Giurgiu)
—	MF	FRA	Réda Rabeï (on loan from (France) Amiens)
—	FW	ROU	Andrei Ciolacu (from (Singapore) Warriors FC)
—	FW	ROU	Róbert Elek (from Botoșani)

Out:

No.	Pos.	Nation	Player
—	GK	ROU	Horia Ciobanu (to Sporting Roșiori, previously on loan at Balotești)
—	GK	ROU	Ștefan Teodorescu (on loan to Voința Turnu Măgurele)
—	FW	ROU	Simon Măzărache (loan return to Universitatea Craiova)
—	GK	ROU	Eugen Brie (to Free agent)
—	DF	ROU	Alexandru Benga (to (Poland) Sandecja Nowy Sącz)
—	DF	ROU	Iulian Carabela (on loan to Poli Timișoara)
—	DF	ROU	Ovidiu Morariu (to Chindia Târgoviște)
—	DF	ROU	Ioan Neag (to Șirineasa)
—	DF	ROU	Vlad Opriș (to Foresta Suceava, previously on loan at Balotești)
—	MF	ROU	Valentin Bărbulescu (to CSMȘ Reșița)
—	MF	ROU	Florin Cazan (on loan to Unirea Slobozia)
—	MF	ROU	George Călințaru (to Farul Constanța)
—	MF	GEO	Nika Dzalamidze (to (Georgia (country)) Dinamo Tbilisi)
—	MF	ROU	Andrei Lungu (to (Israel) Hapoel Nir Ramat HaSharon)
—	MF	ROU	Mădălin Mihăescu (to CSM Politehnica Iași)
—	MF	BIH	Ivan Sesar (to (Finland) Inter Turku)
—	MF	ROU	Marian Stoenac (to Șirineasa)
—	MF	ROU	Alexandru Zaharia (to CSM Politehnica Iași)
—	FW	ROU	Adrian Hurdubei (on loan to Aerostar Bacău, previously on loan at Balotești)
—	FW	ROU	Cătălin Țîră (to Șirineasa)

=== Sepsi Sfântu Gheorghe ===
In:

No.	Pos.	Nation	Player
—	GK	ROU	Victor Rîmniceanu (from Viitorul Constanța)
—	DF	ESP	Albert Dalmau (from (Spain) Hércules)
—	DF	CRO	Jure Obšivač (from (Kazakhstan) Atyrau)
—	DF	PHI	Daisuke Sato (from (Denmark) Horsens)
—	DF	CIV	Ousmane Viera (from Free agent)
—	MF	ROU	Alexandru Chiriță (from CFR Cluj)
—	MF	ESP	Alex Rodriguez (from (Portugal) Boavista)
—	MF	ROU	Yasin Hamed (from CFR Cluj)
—	MF	POR	Filipe Oliveira (from (Cyprus) Anorthosis Famagusta)
—	MF	SCO	Nick Ross (from Free agent)
—	MF	MLI	Ibrahima Tandia (from (France) Tours)
—	FW	NGR	Benjamin Kuku (from Botoșani)
—	FW	MKD	Marko Simonovski (from (Finland) Lahti)

Out:

No.	Pos.	Nation	Player
—	MF	ROU	Patrick Petre (loan return to Dinamo București)
—	GK	ROU	Bogdan Miron (to Șirineasa)
—	DF	ROU	Răzvan Damian (to SR Brașov)
—	DF	ROU	Cristian Oroş (to Luceafărul Oradea)
—	DF	ROU	Ciprian Răduțoiu (to SR Brașov)
—	MF	ROU	Claudiu Herea (to Balotești)
—	MF	ROU	Dragoș Huiban (to Sportul Snagov)
—	MF	ROU	Szilárd Mitra (to Miercurea Ciuc)
—	MF	LTU	Marius Papšys (to (Lithuania) Atlantas)
—	MF	SEN	Issa Thiaw (to (Finland) Ilves)
—	FW	ROU	Victoraș Astafei (to (Croatia) Gorica)
—	FW	ROU	Sandu Iovu (to Știința Miroslava)
—	FW	MNE	Stefan Nikolić (to (Serbia) Napredak Kruševac)

=== Steaua București ===
In:

No.	Pos.	Nation	Player
—	GK	ROU	Cristian Bălgrădean (from Concordia Chiajna)
—	DF	ROU	Valerică Găman (from (Turkey) Karabükspor)
—	MF	ROU	Cristian Tănase (from (Turkey) Karabükspor)

Out:

No.	Pos.	Nation	Player
—	GK	ROU	Toma Niga (on loan to Hermannstadt, previously on loan at Academica Clinceni)
—	GK	ROU	Florin Niță (to (Czech Republic) Sparta Prague)
—	DF	ROU	Mario Mihai (on loan to Academica Clinceni)
—	DF	ROU	Marian Pleașcă (on loan to Voluntari)
—	DF	ROU	Dan Popescu (to Juventus București)
—	DF	ROU	Gabriel Simion (on loan to Juventus București, previously on loan at Academica Clinceni)
—	MF	ROU	Vlad Achim (on loan to Botoșani)
—	MF	ROU	Daniel Benzar (on loan to Voluntari)
—	MF	ROU	Gabriel Enache (to (Russia) Rubin Kazan)
—	MF	ROU	Cătălin Golofca (on loan to Botoșani)
—	MF	ROU	Paul Szecui (on loan to Metaloglobus București)
—	FW	BRA	William De Amorim (on loan to (Turkey) Kayserispor)

=== Viitorul Constanța ===
In:

No.	Pos.	Nation	Player
—	DF	ROU	Andrei Rusu (loan return from Farul Constanța)
—	GK	ROU	Valentin Cojocaru (from (Cyprus) Apollon Limassol)
—	MF	ROU	Ianis Hagi (from (Italy) Fiorentina)
—	FW	NED	Mailson Lima (from (Netherlands) Dordrecht)
—	FW	ROU	Mihai Voduț (from Voluntari)
—	FW	ROU	Robert Răducanu (on loan from Concordia Chiajna)

Out:

No.	Pos.	Nation	Player
—	GK	ROU	Victor Rîmniceanu (to Sepsi Sfântu Gheorghe)
—	DF	ROU	Alin Burdeț (to Ripensia Timișoara, previously on loan at Ghiroda)
—	DF	ROU	Răzvan Horj (on loan to Voluntari)
—	DF	ROU	Szabolcs Kilyen (on loan to Miercurea Ciuc, previously on loan at Târgu Mureș)
—	DF	ROU	Dan Panait (on loan to Concordia Chiajna, previously on loan at Târgu Mureș)
—	DF	ROU	Cosmin Piciu (on loan to Metalul Buzău)
—	DF	ROU	Cătălin Toriște (to Luceafărul Oradea, previously on loan at Argeș Pitești)
—	MF	ROU	Antonio Cruceru (on loan to Voința Turnu Măgurele, previously on loan at Argeș Pitești)
—	MF	BRA	Eric (to (Qatar) Al-Markhiya)
—	MF	ROU	Paul Iacob (on loan to Dunărea Călărași, previously on loan at Târgu Mureș)
—	FW	ROU	Aurelian Chițu (to (South Korea) Daejeon Citizen)
—	FW	ROU	Florin Cioablă (to Concordia Chiajna)
—	FW	ROU	Cristian Ene (on loan to Universitatea Cluj)
—	FW	ROU	Alexandru Margină (to Free agent)
—	FW	ROU	Alexandru Stoica (on loan to Dunărea Călărași, previously on loan at Târgu Mureș)
—	FW	ROU	George Țucudean (to CFR Cluj)

=== Voluntari ===
In:

No.	Pos.	Nation	Player
—	GK	ROU	Mihai Mincă (on loan from Șirineasa)
—	DF	ROU	Bogdan Bucurică (from Concordia Chiajna)
—	DF	ROU	Marian Pleașcă (on loan from Steaua București)
—	DF	FRA	Alphousseyni Sané (from Free agent)
—	DF	ROU	Răzvan Horj (on loan from Viitorul Constanța)
—	MF	ROU	Daniel Benzar (on loan from Steaua București)
—	MF	ROU	Lucian Sânmărtean (from Free agent)

Out:

No.	Pos.	Nation	Player
—	GK	ROU	George Gavrilaș (on loan to Juventus București)
—	DF	ROU	Vlad Olteanu (loan return to Dinamo București)
—	DF	ROU	Mihai Popescu (loan return to Dinamo București)
—	DF	ROU	Florin Acsinte (to Botoșani)
—	DF	ROU	Vasile Maftei (to Rapid București)
—	DF	BUL	Venelin Filipov (to (Bulgaria) Etar Veliko Tarnovo)
—	MF	ROU	Vasile Nicolae (to ASU Politehnica Timișoara, previously on loan at Afumați)
—	MF	ROU	Doru Popadiuc (to (Kazakhstan) Irtysh Pavlodar)
—	MF	ROU	Sorin Tăbăcariu (to Argeș Pitești)
—	MF	ROU	Marius Tudorică (to Farul Constanța)
—	FW	ROU	Mihai Voduț (to Viitorul Constanța)

== Liga II ==
=== Academica Clinceni ===
In:

No.	Pos.	Nation	Player
—	GK	ROU	Octavian Vâlceanu (on loan from Viitorul Domnești)
—	DF	ROU	Ionuț Baniță (on loan from Viitorul Domnești)
—	DF	ROU	Mihai Dobrescu (on loan from Viitorul Domnești)
—	DF	ROU	Raul Hreniuc (on loan from CS U II Craiova)
—	DF	ROU	Andrei Răuță (from Balotești)
—	MF	ROU	Florin Achim (from Olimpia Satu Mare)
—	MF	ROU	Florin Chitaș (from Olimpia Satu Mare)
—	MF	ROU	Mario Mihai (on loan from Steaua București)
—	MF	ROU	Paul Pațurcă (on loan from Viitorul Domnești)
—	MF	ROU	Tiberiu Petriș (from Târgu Mureș)
—	MF	ROU	Marian Târșă (on loan from Botoșani)
—	FW	ROU	Costin Curelea (from Free agent)
—	FW	ROU	Adrian Moldovan (on loan from CSM Politehnica Iași)
—	FW	ROU	Alexandru Popescu (on loan from CS U Craiova)
—	FW	ROU	Arthur Teuț (from Free agent)

Out:

No.	Pos.	Nation	Player
—	GK	ROU	Toma Niga (loan return to Steaua București, later on loan to Hermannstadt)
—	DF	ROU	Gabriel Simion (loan return to Steaua București, later on loan to Juventus București)
—	DF	ROU	Ionuț Tătaru (to Cetate Deva)
—	MF	ROU	Stephan Drăghici (loan return to CS U Craiova, later on loan to Juventus București)
—	DF	ROU	Mihai Deaconescu (to Retired)
—	DF	ROU	Daniel Groza (to Hermannstadt)
—	DF	ROU	Bogdan Matei (to Oțelul Galați)
—	DF	NGR	Samson Nwabueze (to Flacăra Horezu)
—	DF	ROU	Cristian Pulhac (to Free agent)
—	MF	ROU	Cristian Balgiu (on loan to Juventus București)
—	MF	ROU	Marian Constantinescu (to Juventus București)
—	MF	ROU	Alexandru Lazăr (to (Spain) Paiporta)
—	FW	ROU	Mihai Ion (to Voința Turnu Măgurele)
—	FW	ROU	Alexandru Văduva (to Agricola Borcea)

=== Afumați ===
In:

No.	Pos.	Nation	Player
—	DF	ROU	Costin Ciochină (from Metaloglobus București)
—	DF	ROU	Laurențiu Vențer (from Free agent)
—	MF	ROU	Cristian Novacek (on loan from Concordia Chiajna)

Out:

No.	Pos.	Nation	Player
—	MF	ROU	Vasile Nicolae (loan return to Voluntari, later signed by ASU Politehnica Timișoara)
—	DF	ROU	Ionuț Baniță (to Viitorul Domnești, later on loan to Academica Clinceni)
—	DF	ROU	Victor Caliani (to Flacăra Horezu)
—	MF	ROU	Sorin Ispir (to Metaloglobus București)
—	FW	ROU	Marian Vlada (to Rapid București)

=== Argeș Pitești ===
In:

No.	Pos.	Nation	Player
—	DF	ROU	Mădălin Ciucă (from UTA Arad)
—	MF	ROU	Sorin Tăbăcariu (from Voluntari)
—	FW	ROU	Mădălin Martin (from Metaloglobus București)

Out:

No.	Pos.	Nation	Player
—	DF	ROU	Cătălin Toriște (loan return to Viitorul Constanța, later on loan to Luceafărul Oradea)
—	MF	ROU	Antonio Cruceru (loan return to Viitorul Constanța, later on loan at Voința Turnu Măgurele)
—	GK	ROU	Alexandru Oprican (on loan to Atletic Bradu)
—	FW	ROU	Marius Albu (on loan to Atletic Bradu)

=== ASU Politehnica Timișoara ===
In:

No.	Pos.	Nation	Player
—	GK	ROU	Bogdan Dascălu (from Olimpia Satu Mare)
—	DF	ROU	Cristian Scutaru (from UTA Arad)
—	MF	ROU	Daniel Boloca (from Free agent)
—	MF	ROU	Florin Lazea (from CSM Lugoj)
—	MF	ROU	Vasile Nicolae (from Voluntari, previously on loan at Afumați)
—	FW	COD	Olivier Lusamba (from Olimpia Satu Mare)
—	FW	ROU	Marvin Schieb (from Free agent)

Out:

No.	Pos.	Nation	Player
—	GK	ROU	Emanuel Fișteag (to Free agent)
—	GK	GRE	Markos Gakos (on loan to Ghiroda)
—	DF	BIH	Borislav Topić (to Free agent)
—	MF	ROU	Alin Crișanov (to Retired)
—	MF	ROU	Darius Neamțu (on loan to Ghiroda, previously on loan at Ripensia Timișoara)
—	MF	ROU	Mădălin Stancu (to ACS Dumbrăvița)
—	MF	ROU	Andrei Țugui (to Ripensia Timișoara)
—	FW	ROU	Alexandru Bădăuță (to Ripensia Timișoara)
—	FW	COD	Olivier Lusamba (to Free agent)
—	FW	ROU	Marius Staicu (to CSMȘ Reșița)

=== Balotești ===
In:

No.	Pos.	Nation	Player
—	GK	ROU	Mihai Eșanu (on loan from Dinamo București)
—	DF	ROU	Robert Bolozan (from Concordia Chiajna)
—	DF	ROU	Cosmin Mihai (from Dacia Unirea Brăila)
—	MF	ROU	Claudiu Herea (from Sepsi Sfântu Gheorghe)
—	MF	ROU	Ovidiu Herea (from Free agent)
—	MF	BUL	Samuel Koprindzhiyski (from Free agent)
—	FW	ROU	Alexandru Ionescu (from Sportul Snagov)
—	FW	ROU	Cosmin Novac (on loan from Viitorul Domnești)

Out:

No.	Pos.	Nation	Player
—	GK	ROU	Horia Ciobanu (loan return to Juventus București)
—	DF	ROU	Dănuț Ciubuc (loan return to Sporting Roșiori)
—	DF	ROU	Vlad Opriș (loan return to Juventus București)
—	FW	ROU	Adrian Hurdubei (loan return to Juventus București, later on loan to Aerostar Bacău)
—	DF	ROU	Andrei Răuță (to Academica Clinceni)
—	MF	ROU	Alexandru Coman (to Hermannstadt)
—	MF	ROU	Alin Gojnea (to Sportul Snagov)
—	MF	BUL	Samuel Koprindzhiyski (to Free agent)
—	FW	ROU	Andrei Suciu (to (Greece) Tsiklitiras)

=== Chindia Târgoviște ===
In:

No.	Pos.	Nation	Player
—	DF	ROU	Ovidiu Morariu (from Juventus București)
—	MF	ROU	Rafael Licu (on loan from Viitorul Mihai Georgescu, previously on loan at Târgu Mureș)
—	MF	ROU	Daniel Rogoveanu (from Concordia Chiajna)
—	FW	ROU	Daniel Florea (from UTA Arad)
—	FW	ROU	Sergiu Jurj (on loan from CS U Craiova, previously on loan at Olimpia Satu Mare)

Out:

No.	Pos.	Nation	Player
—	DF	ROU	Denis Ispas (to Șirineasa)
—	MF	ROU	Adrian Grigore (to Rapid București)
—	MF	ROU	Georgian Honciu (to Șirineasa)
—	MF	ROU	Cristinel Matei (to Astra II Ploiești)
—	FW	ROU	Marius Bâtfoi (to CSA Steaua București)

=== Dacia Unirea Brăila ===
In:

No.	Pos.	Nation	Player
—	GK	ROU	Paul Botaș (from Voința Turnu Măgurele)
—	DF	ROU	Marian Anghelina (from Șirineasa)
—	DF	ROU	Alexandru Gîț (from Universitatea Cluj)
—	DF	TUN	Hamza Ben Abda (from (Tunisia) Bizertin)
—	DF	ROU	Sorin Sima (on loan from CS U Craiova)
—	DF	ROU	Alexandru Nicola (on loan from Steaua II București)
—	DF	ROU	Tudor Țăranu (from Viitorul Fântânele)
—	MF	ALB	Jurgen Dushkaj (from Avântul Valea Mărului)
—	MF	ROU	Alin Manea (on loan from CS U Craiova, previously on loan at Sportul Snagov)
—	MF	ROU	Raul Vitan (from Sănătatea Cluj)

Out:

No.	Pos.	Nation	Player
—	GK	ROU	Albert Popa (to Unirea Slobozia)
—	DF	ROU	Gabriel Lazăr (to Înainte Modelu)
—	DF	ROU	Cosmin Mihai (to Balotești)
—	DF	ROU	Marius Moroianu (on loan to CS Făurei)
—	MF	ROU	Sorin Frunză (to Retired)
—	MF	ROU	Gabriel Iosofache (to Free agent)
—	MF	ROU	Robert Roșoagă (to Mioveni)
—	MF	ROU	Costel Roșu (to Victoria Traian)

=== Dunărea Călărași ===
In:

No.	Pos.	Nation	Player
—	GK	ROU	Florin Muntean (from Olimpia Satu Mare)
—	DF	ROU	Alin Dobrosavlevici (on loan from Concordia Chiajna)
—	DF	SEN	Gaston Mendy (from Târgu Mureș)
—	MF	ROU	Alexandru Avram (from Free agent)
—	MF	ROU	Cătălin Doman (on loan from Poli Timișoara)
—	MF	ROU	Paul Iacob (on loan from Viitorul Constanța, previously on loan at Târgu Mureș)
—	FW	ROU	Ciprian Rus (from Pandurii Târgu Jiu)
—	FW	ROU	Alexandru Stoica (on loan from Viitorul Constanța, previously on loan at Târgu Mureș)
—	FW	CRO	Dino Špehar (on loan from CFR Cluj, previously on loan at Concordia Chiajna)

Out:

No.	Pos.	Nation	Player
—	DF	SEN	Aboubacar Gassama (to Free agent)
—	MF	ROU	Alexandru Dincă (on loan to Metaloglobus București)
—	MF	ROU	Andrei Pușcașu (to Free agent)
—	FW	ROU	Valentin Balint (to Mioveni)
—	FW	ROU	Bogdan Danciu (on loan to Oțelul Galați)
—	FW	POR	André Mesquita (to (Portugal) Canelas 2010)

=== Foresta Suceava ===
In:

No.	Pos.	Nation	Player
—	DF	GBS	Eridson (from Free agent)
—	DF	FRA	Moussa Konaté (from Free agent)
—	DF	BUL	Ivan Makriev (from (Bulgaria) Pirin Gotse Delchev)
—	DF	ROU	Paul Mateciuc (from Știința Miroslava)
—	DF	ROU	Vlad Opriș (from Juventus București)
—	MF	ROU	Cristian Gulei (from LPS Suceava)
—	MF	MDA	Oleg Lupușor (from (Moldova) Speranța Nisporeni)
—	MF	ROU	Robert Martin (from Şomuz Fălticeni)
—	MF	ROU	Constantin Mușea (from Delta Dobrogea Tulcea)
—	MF	ROU	Florin Negură (from LPS Suceava)
—	MF	ROU	Andrei Netea (from Şomuz Fălticeni)
—	FW	FRA	Loïc Kharoubi (from Free agent)
—	FW	ROU	Dan Nedelcu (from Teiul Poiana Teiului)

Out:

No.	Pos.	Nation	Player
—	DF	MDA	Alexandru Belevschi (to (Latvia) Valmiera)
—	DF	ROU	Florin Cordoș (to Free agent)
—	DF	GBS	Eridson (to (Portugal) CD Cinfães)
—	DF	ITA	Alessandro Masella (to Aerostar Bacău)
—	DF	GHA	Daniel Pappoe (to Free agent)
—	MF	FRA	Charles Acolatse (on loan to Juventus București)
—	MF	FRA	Belkacem Dali-Amar (to Free agent)
—	MF	FRA	Issaga Diallo (to Free agent)
—	MF	CGO	Allan Kimbaloula (to Free agent)
—	MF	ARM	Edgar Movsesyan (from Free agent)
—	FW	ROU	Sergiu Alexandrovici (to Free agent)
—	FW	MAR	Naoufal Boumina (to Free agent)
—	FW	FRA	Khalid Chalabi (to Free agent)
—	FW	ROU	Dan Nedelcu (to Free agent)

=== Hermannstadt ===
In:

No.	Pos.	Nation	Player
—	GK	ROU	Angel Baumann (from Cetate Deva)
—	GK	ROU	Toma Niga (on loan from Steaua București, previously on loan at Academica Clinceni)
—	DF	ROU	Daniel Groza (from Dinamo București, previously on loan at Academica Clinceni)
—	MF	ROU	Alexandru Coman (from Balotești)
—	MF	ROU	Alexandru Curtean (from Gaz Metan Mediaș)
—	MF	ROU	Cristian Danci (from Gaz Metan Mediaș)
—	MF	ROU	Paul Hodea (from CS U Craiova)
—	MF	ROU	Olivian Surugiu (from Gaz Metan Mediaș)
—	FW	ROU	Alexandru Târnovan (from Botoșani)

Out:

No.	Pos.	Nation	Player
—	GK	ROU	Horațiu Moldovan (loan return to CFR Cluj)
—	MF	ROU	Alexandru Neacșa (on loan to Luceafărul Oradea)
—	MF	ROU	Radu Necșulescu (on loan to Oțelul Galați)
—	FW	ROU	Adrian Cîrstean (to FC Avrig)
—	FW	ROU	Dan Roman (to Retired)

=== Luceafărul Oradea ===
In:

No.	Pos.	Nation	Player
—	GK	ROU	Alexandru Gudea (from Free agent)
—	DF	ROU	Alin Bărîcă (on loan from Astra Giurgiu)
—	DF	ROU	Cristian Oroş (from Sepsi Sfântu Gheorghe)
—	DF	ROU	Cătălin Toriște (from Viitorul Constanța, previously on loan at Argeș Pitești)
—	DF	NED	Calvin Valies (from (Greece) Veria)
—	MF	ROU	Denis Băban (from Becicherecu Mic)
—	MF	ROU	Paul Chiorean (from Unirea Dej)
—	MF	ROU	Darius Lukács (from Olimpia Satu Mare)
—	MF	POR	Bruno Luz (from Free agent)
—	MF	ROU	Alexandru Neacșa (on loan from Hermannstadt)
—	MF	ROU	Vasile Pop (from Olimpia Satu Mare)
—	FW	ROU	Andrei Ludușan (from Iernut)

Out:

No.	Pos.	Nation	Player
—	GK	GRE	Georgios Gakos (to Free agent)
—	MF	ROU	Adrian Bedea (to Șirineasa, later on loan to Cetate Deva)
—	MF	ROU	Marius Cioiu (to Șirineasa)
—	MF	ROU	Darius Covaci (to Free agent)
—	MF	ROU	Iulian Cuc (to CSC Sânmartin)
—	MF	ROU	Andrei Dragu (to Șirineasa)
—	MF	ROU	Florian Pârvu (to Free agent)

=== Metaloglobus București ===
In:

No.	Pos.	Nation	Player
—	GK	ROU	Alexandru Burci (on loan from Dinamo București, previously on loan at Atletic Bradu)
—	GK	ROU	Adrian Gherasim (from Dinamo București)
—	DF	ROU	Sebastian Agache (from Farul Constanța)
—	DF	ROU	Claudiu Săftescu (from Concordia Chiajna)
—	MF	ROU	Alexandru Dincă (on loan from Dunărea Călărași)
—	MF	ROU	Sorin Ispir (from Afumați)
—	MF	USA	Shadrack Nsukami (from Free agent)
—	MF	ROU	Iulian Roșu (from Free agent)
—	MF	ROU	Paul Szecui (on loan from Steaua București)
—	FW	ROU	Andrei Voican (from Retired)

Out:

No.	Pos.	Nation	Player
—	DF	ROU	Andrei Roman (loan return to Astra Giurgiu)
—	GK	ROU	Mihai Nedelcu (to Free agent)
—	GK	ROU	Octavian Stanciu (to Free agent)
—	DF	FRA	Checkoumar Baradji (to Free agent)
—	DF	ROU	Costin Ciochină (to Afumați)
—	DF	ROU	Robert Gherghe (to Mioveni)
—	DF	ROU	Florin Iordache (on loan to CS Tunari)
—	MF	ALG	Mohamed Belhadj (to (Malta) Naxxar Lions)
—	MF	ROU	Silviu Dragomir (on loan to Tunari)
—	MF	ROU	Ion Marian (to Free agent)
—	MF	USA	Shadrack Nsukami (to Free agent)
—	FW	ROU	Mădălin Martin (to Argeș Pitești)

=== Mioveni ===
In:

No.	Pos.	Nation	Player
—	DF	ROU	Robert Gherghe (from Metaloglobus București)
—	DF	ROU	Florin Ilie (from Free agent)
—	MF	ROU	Alexandru Neagu (from Free agent)
—	MF	ROU	Robert Roșoagă (from Dacia Unirea Brăila)
—	FW	ROU	Valentin Balint (from Dunărea Călărași)

Out:

No.	Pos.	Nation	Player
—	DF	ROU	Alexandru Ichim (to Petrolul Ploiești)
—	MF	ROU	Cristian Andor (to Petrolul Ploiești)
—	FW	ROU	Daniel Ene (to CSMȘ Reșița)

=== Olimpia Satu Mare (The club was dissolved) ===
In:

No.	Pos.	Nation	Player

Out:

No.	Pos.	Nation	Player
—	GK	ROU	Bogdan Dascălu (to ASU Politehnica Timișoara)
—	MF	ROU	Paul Copaci (loan return to UTA Arad, later on loan to CSMȘ Reșița)
—	GK	ROU	Florin Muntean (to Dunărea Călărași)
—	GK	ROU	Marius Șuta (to (Germany) SV Weingarten)
—	DF	ROU	Ciprian Duruș (to Minerul Baia Mare)
—	DF	ROU	Ionuț Hlinca (to ACS Dumitra)
—	DF	ROU	Cosmin Iuhas (to Retired)
—	DF	ROU	Cristian Munteanu (to Pandurii Târgu Jiu)
—	DF	ROU	Florin Mureșan (to Free agent)
—	DF	ROU	Tamás Szasz (to Gaz Metan Mediaș)
—	MF	ROU	Florin Achim (to Academica Clinceni)
—	MF	ROU	Ciprian Brata (to Free agent)
—	MF	ROU	Florin Chitaș (to Academica Clinceni)
—	MF	ROU	Denis Chivari (to Unirea Tășnad, previously on loan)
—	MF	ROU	Denis Cubaș (to Unirea Tășnad)
—	MF	ROU	Darius Lukács (to Luceafărul Oradea)
—	MF	ROU	Bogdan Miholca (to ACS Dumitra)
—	MF	ROU	Dumitru Muntean (to (Germany) SV Weingarten)
—	MF	ROU	Pavel Nemeș (to Unirea Tășnad)
—	MF	ROU	Vasile Pop (to Luceafărul Oradea)
—	MF	ROU	Romario Rus (to ACSF Recea)
—	MF	ROU	Alin Văsălie (to Universitatea Cluj)
—	MF	ROU	Robert Villand (to (Hungary) Füzesgyarmati)
—	MF	ROU	Levente Vincze (to (Hungary) Tiszafüred)
—	FW	ROU	Cosmin Bura (to Free agent)
—	FW	COD	Olivier Lusamba (to ASU Politehnica Timișoara)
—	FW	ROU	Dávid Vincze (to (Hungary) Tiszafüred)

=== Pandurii Târgu Jiu ===
In:

No.	Pos.	Nation	Player
—	GK	ROU	Bogdan Moga (from Târgu Mureș)
—	DF	ROU	Robert Băjan (from Târgu Mureș)
—	DF	ROU	Cristian Munteanu (from Olimpia Satu Mare)
—	DF	SRB	Milenko Škorić (from (Serbia) Kolubara)
—	MF	KOS	Drilon Cenaj (from (Croatia) Novigrad)
—	FW	ROU	Cosmin Ionică (from Național Sebiș)
—	FW	ROU	Brian Lemac (on loan from Universitatea Cluj)

Out:

No.	Pos.	Nation	Player
—	GK	ROU	Ovidiu Jianu (on loan to Internațional Bălești)
—	DF	ROU	Constantin Drugă (to Șirineasa)
—	DF	ROU	Robert Frățilescu (to Șirineasa)
—	DF	ROU	Sergiu Homei (to Free agent)
—	DF	ROU	Daniel Lung (to Șirineasa)
—	MF	ROU	Marius Cocîrlă (to Farul Constanța)
—	MF	ROU	Rodemis Trifu (to Free agent)
—	FW	ROU	Vlad Bujor (to Free agent)
—	FW	ROU	Gabriel Dodoi (to CFR Cluj)
—	FW	SLO	Enis Đurković (to (Austria) SAK Klagenfurt)
—	FW	ROU	Ciprian Rus (to Dunărea Călărași)

=== Ripensia Timișoara ===
In:

No.	Pos.	Nation	Player
—	GK	ROU	Mario Contra (on loan from Poli Timișoara, previously on loan at Ghiroda)
—	DF	ROU	Cristian Bocșan (on loan from Poli Timișoara)
—	DF	ROU	Alin Burdeț (from Viitorul Constanța, previously on loan at Ghiroda)
—	DF	ROU	Marius Toma (from Becicherecu Mic)
—	MF	ROU	Andrei Țugui (from ASU Politehnica Timișoara)
—	MF	ROU	Costel Zurbagiu (on loan from Fortuna Becicherecu Mic)
—	FW	ROU	Alexandru Bădăuță (from ASU Politehnica Timișoara)

Out:

No.	Pos.	Nation	Player
—	MF	ROU	Marius Semeniuc (loan return to Unirea Banloc, later on loan at Ghiroda)
—	MF	ROU	Darius Neamțu (loan return to ASU Politehnica Timișoara, later on loan to Ghiroda)
—	FW	ROU	Claudiu Matiș (loan return to Electrica Timișoara, later on loan to Ghiroda)
—	DF	ROU	Laurențiu Luca (to Progresul Gătaia)
—	MF	ROU	Eduard Codrean (to Free agent)
—	MF	ROU	Octavian Popescu (on loan to Ghiroda)
—	MF	ROU	Adrian Zaluschi (on loan to Poli Timișoara)

=== Sportul Snagov ===
In:

No.	Pos.	Nation	Player
—	GK	ROU	Florin Iacob (from Free agent)
—	MF	ROU	Viorel Ferfelea (from Free agent)
—	MF	ROU	Alin Gojnea (to Sportul Snagov)
—	MF	ROU	Dragoș Huiban (from Sepsi Sfântu Gheorghe)
—	MF	AFG	Modjieb Jamali (from Free agent)
—	MF	ROU	Ionuț Pașcu (from Becicherecu Mic)
—	MF	FRA	Ayoub Tazouti (from (France) US Lormont)
—	FW	FRA	Loïc Gagnon (from Free agent)

Out:

No.	Pos.	Nation	Player
—	MF	ROU	Alin Manea (loan return to CS U Craiova, later on loan to Dacia Unirea Brăila)
—	GK	ROU	Károly Fila (to (Hungary) Kazincbarcika)
—	GK	CGO	M'Sendo Kololo (to Free agent)
—	DF	ROU	Eduard Cornea (to Cetate Deva)
—	DF	ROU	Vasile Priboi (to Free agent)
—	DF	ROU	Andrei Voineag (to Cetate Deva)
—	MF	ROU	Gabriel Bragă (to SC Popești-Leordeni)
—	MF	ROU	Dragoș Penescu (to (Denmark) Vejle)
—	FW	ROU	Leonard Dobre (to SC Popești-Leordeni)
—	FW	FRA	Loïc Gagnon (to Free agent)
—	FW	ROU	Alexandru Ionescu (to Balotești)

=== Știința Miroslava ===
In:

No.	Pos.	Nation	Player
—	GK	ROU	Ștefan Târnovanu (on loan from CSM Politehnica Iași)
—	DF	ROU	Andu Moisi (on loan from CSM Politehnica Iași)
—	MF	ROU	Sandu Iovu (from Sepsi Sfântu Gheorghe)
—	MF	ROU	Ciprian Milea (from Farul Constanța)
—	FW	ROU	Alexandru Taciuc (on loan from CSM Politehnica Iași)
—	FW	ROU	Cosmin Țapu (from CSM Roman)

Out:

No.	Pos.	Nation	Player
—	GK	ROU	Raul Avram (loan return to Botoșani, later signed by Petrolul Ploiești)
—	DF	ROU	Ștefan Băghiceanu (to Free agent)
—	DF	ROU	Silviu Cerneuțanu (to Free agent)
—	DF	MDA	Vasile Curchi (to (Moldova) FC Sfântul Gheorghe)
—	DF	ROU	Paul Mateciuc (to Foresta Suceava)
—	DF	ROU	George Maxim (to Viitorul Curița)
—	DF	ROU	Andrei Sărițanu (to Retired)
—	DF	ROU	Ovidiu Tăcuțanu (to Free agent)
—	MF	ROU	Denis Botezatu (to Viitorul Curița)
—	MF	ROU	Cornel Căinari (to Aerostar Bacău)
—	MF	ROU	Radu Cozma (to Free agent)
—	MF	ROU	Alexandru Taciuc (to CSM Politehnica Iași)
—	FW	ROU	Adrian Sasu (to Free agent)

=== Târgu Mureș (The club was dissolved) ===
In:

No.	Pos.	Nation	Player

Out:

No.	Pos.	Nation	Player
—	DF	ROU	Szabolcs Kilyen (loan return to Viitorul Constanța, later on loan to Miercurea Ciuc)
—	DF	ROU	Dan Panait (loan return to Viitorul Constanța, later on loan to Concordia Chiajna)
—	MF	ROU	Paul Iacob (loan return to Viitorul Constanța, later on loan to Dunărea Călărași)
—	MF	ROU	Rafael Licu (loan return to Viitorul Mihai Georgescu, later on loan to Chindia Târgoviște)
—	MF	ROU	Cosmin Sârbu (loan return to CFR Cluj)
—	FW	ROU	Alexandru Stoica (loan return to Viitorul Constanța, later on loan to Dunărea Călărași)
—	GK	ROU	Bogdan Moga (to Pandurii Târgu Jiu)
—	GK	ROU	Tudor Negrușa (to Unirea Slobozia)
—	DF	ROU	Robert Băjan (to Pandurii Târgu Jiu)
—	DF	ROU	Carlos Cherteș (to Free agent)
—	DF	ROU	Petruţ Chirlejan (to Cetate Deva)
—	DF	SEN	Gaston Mendy (to Dunărea Călărași)
—	DF	ROU	Andrei Tornyai (to Cetate Deva)
—	MF	ROU	Alpar Birtalan (to ACSF Recea)
—	MF	ROU	Andrei Bordaș (to Free agent)
—	MF	ROU	Robert Candrea (to (Poland) Olimpia Grudziądz)
—	MF	ROU	Raul Iliescu (to Free agent)
—	MF	ARG	Maximiliano Laso (to Free agent)
—	MF	CRO	Luka Mijoković (to (Croatia) NK Novigrad)
—	MF	ROU	Bogdan Onul (to Free agent)
—	MF	ROU	Vasile Petra (to UTA Arad)
—	MF	ROU	Tiberiu Petriș (to Academica Clinceni)

=== UTA Arad ===
In:

No.	Pos.	Nation	Player
—	GK	ROU	Roberto Bodea (from Gloria L.T. Cermei)
—	GK	LTU	Tomas Švedkauskas (from Free agent)
—	DF	ROU	Daniel Dan (from Free agent)
—	DF	ROU	Denis Lazăr (from Șirineasa)
—	DF	MNE	Stevan Marković (from Free agent)
—	DF	MDA	Mihai Roșca (from (Moldova) Dinamo-Auto Tiraspol)
—	MF	CAN	Hanson Boakai (from Free agent)
—	MF	ROU	Darius Buia (from Poli Timișoara, previously on loan at Gloria L.T. Cermei)
—	MF	ROU	Angelo Iuga (from CS U Craiova)
—	MF	ROU	Vasile Petra (from Târgu Mureș)
—	MF	ITA	Federico Sorato (from Free agent)
—	FW	ROU	David Popa (from (England) Birmingham City)

Out:

No.	Pos.	Nation	Player
—	GK	BIH	Branko Grahovac (to Free agent)
—	GK	LTU	Tomas Švedkauskas (to (Lithuania) Trakai)
—	DF	MKD	Mevlan Adili (to (North Macedonia) Shkëndija)
—	DF	MKD	Bujamin Asani (to (North Macedonia) Rabotnički)
—	DF	ROU	Mădălin Ciucă (to Argeș Pitești)
—	DF	ROU	Richard Filaret (to Retired)
—	DF	ROU	Cristian Scutaru (to ASU Politehnica Timișoara)
—	MF	CAN	Hanson Boakai (to (Finland) Ekenäs)
—	MF	ROU	Alin Buleică (to Free agent)
—	MF	ROU	Alin Cârstocea (to Farul Constanța)
—	MF	ROU	Paul Copaci (on loan to CSMȘ Reșița, previously on loan at Olimpia Satu Mare)
—	MF	ROU	Paul Păcurar (to Free agent)
—	MF	ROU	Sorin Strătilă (to Brașov)
—	FW	ROU	Daniel Florea (to Chindia Târgoviște)
