= 2017 Cupa Ligii final =

- Event: 2016–17 Cupa Ligii
Dinamo București	Poli Timișoara
2	0
- Date: 20 May 2017
- Venue: Arena Națională, Bucharest
- Referee: Radu Petrescu
- Attendance: 20,000

The 2017 Cupa Ligii final was the final match of the 2016–17 Cupa Ligii, played between Dinamo București and Poli Timișoara. Dinamo București won the match with 2–0.

== Match ==
20 May 2017
20:00 EET (UTC+02)

Dinamo București	2–0	Poli Timișoara
Nemec 6', 26'	Report

Arena Națională, Bucharest
Attendance: 20,000
Referee: Radu Petrescu

GK	26	(Panama) Jaime Penedo
DF	29	(Spain) José Romera
DF	5	(Romania) Ionuț Nedelcearu
DF	15	(France) Claude Dielna
DF	7	(Romania) Steliano Filip
MF	20	(Croatia) Antun Palić (c)
MF	18	(South Africa) May Mahlangu
MF	10	(Romania) Dan Nistor
MF	4	(Romania) Sergiu Hanca	(substituted off) 73'
FW	9	(Brazil) Rivaldinho	(substituted off) 63'
FW	17	(Slovakia) Adam Nemec	(substituted off) 83'
Substitutes:
FW	8	(Jordan) Tha'er Bawab	(substituted on) 63'
MF	6	(Bosnia and Herzegovina) Azer Bušuladžić	(substituted on) 73'
MF	30	(Romania) Andrei Tîrcoveanu	(substituted on) 83'
GK	99	(Lithuania) Vytautas Černiauskas
DF	16	(Argentina) Maximiliano Oliva
FW	28	(Croatia) Luka Marić
DF	31	(Romania) Claudiu Bumba
Manager:
(Romania) Cosmin Contra

GK	33	(Romania) Vasile Curileac
DF	94	(Romania) Denis Haruț
DF	30	(Romania) Alin Șeroni
DF	15	(Romania) Cristian Bocșan
DF	22	(Croatia) Leopold Novak	(substituted off) 90+1'
MF	9	(Romania) Alexandru Popovici
MF	19	(Romania) Alin Ignea
MF	18	(Romania) Andrei Artean (c)	(substituted off) 57'
MF	26	(Romania) Cosmin Bîrnoi
FW	11	(Croatia) Josip Fuček	(substituted off) 57'
FW	85	(Romania) Octavian Drăghici
Substitutes:
MF	10	(Romania) Cătălin Doman	(substituted on) 57'
MF	16	(Croatia) Josip Šoljić	(substituted on) 57'
DF	4	(Romania) Ionuț Murariu	(substituted on) 90+1'
GK	1	(Romania) Mădălin Smaranda
DF	6	(Romania) Harald Fridrich
MF	12	(Romania) Sebastian Mailat
MF	14	(Romania) Cristian Pădurariu
Manager:
(Romania) Ionuț Popa

MATCH OFFICIALS

- Assistant referees:
  - Ciprian Danșa
  - Daniel Mitruți
- Fourth official:
  - George Găman
- Additional assistant referees:

MATCH RULES

- 90 minutes.
- 30 minutes of extra-time if necessary.
- Penalty shoot-out if scores still level.
- Seven named substitutes.
- Maximum of three substitutions.

== See also ==
- 2017 Cupa României final
