= 2015–16 NK Inter Zaprešić season =

Croatian football club season

Nogometni Klub Inter Zaprešić (English: Football Club Inter Zaprešić) is a Croatian football club based in Zaprešić, a town northwest of the capital Zagreb founded in 1929.

They play in the Prva HNL after they were promoted from the Druga HNL at the end of the 2013–14 season.

== Competitions ==
=== 1.HNL ===
10 July 2015 Match 1	NK Inter Zaprešić	0 - 0	Rijeka	Zaprešić
21:00 EET	Komorski (yellow card) 33'; Tomislav Mazalović (yellow card) 35'; Tomislav Hanžek (yellow card) 49'; Ivan Čeliković (yellow card) 90+3'; Petar Bočkaj (yellow card) 90+3'	Summary	Leovac (yellow card) 18'; Kvržić (yellow card) 35'; Močinić (yellow card) 52'	Stadium: Stadion ŠRC Zaprešić; Attendance: 3,380; Referee: (Croatia) Goran Gabrilo

18 July 2015 Match 2	NK Inter Zaprešić	1 - 1	NK Zagreb	Zaprešić
22:00 EET	Tomislav Mazalović (yellow card) 49'; Andrea Ottochian (yellow card) 55'; Nestorovski 77'; Ivan Čeliković (yellow card) 85'	Summary	Boban (yellow card) 16'; Medić 30'; Bernardo Matić (yellow card) 44' (yellow-red card); Matias Šulc (yellow card) 51'; Mario Ćubel (yellow card) 71'	Stadium: Stadion ŠRC Zaprešić; Attendance: 532; Referee: (Croatia) Domagoj Vuckov

25 July 2015 Match 3	Dinamo Zagreb	5 - 1	NK Inter Zaprešić	Zagreb
20:00 EET	Hodžić 8' 58' 61'; Fernandes 39' (pen.) 56'; Musa (yellow card) 59'	Summary	Šoljić (yellow card) 17'; Nestorovski (yellow card) 38' (goal) 51'; Komorski (red card) 39'	Stadium: Stadion Maksimir; Attendance: 1,207; Referee: (Croatia) Tihomir Pejin

1 August 2015 Match 4	NK Inter Zaprešić	0 - 0	RNK Split	Zaprešić
22:00 EET	Šoljić (yellow card) 35' (yellow-red card)	Summary	Chung Woon (yellow card) 6'; Ante Majstorović (yellow card) 38'; Blagojević (yellow card) 45+1'	Stadium: Stadion ŠRC Zaprešić; Attendance: 567; Referee: (Croatia) Ante Vucemilovic Simunovic

8 August 2015 Match 5	NK Istra 1961	0 - 0	NK Inter Zaprešić	Pula
20:00 EET	Branko Ojdanic (yellow card) 24'; Antonio Repić (yellow card) 62'; Zlomislić (yellow card) 81'	Summary	Petar Bočkaj (yellow card) 27'; Ivan Čeliković (yellow card) 31'; Blažević (yellow card) 86'; Posavec (yellow card) 90'	Stadium: Stadion Aldo Drosina; Attendance: 1,519; Referee: (Croatia) Igor Križarić

14 August 2015 Match 6	NK Inter Zaprešić	2 - 1	Slaven Belupo	Zaprešić
21:00 EET	Blažević 58'; Nestorovski 70' (yellow card) 90+3'	Summary	Delić 37'; Ozobić (red card) 58'	Stadium: Stadion ŠRC Zaprešić; Attendance: 516; Referee: (Croatia) Dalibor Mlakar

21 August 2015 Match 7	Lokomotiva	1 - 2	NK Inter Zaprešić	Zagreb
21:00 EET	Leko (yellow card) 27' (red card) 82'; Ćorić 43'; Prenga (yellow card) 62'; Barišić (yellow card) 90+3'	Summary	Nestorovski 11'; Josip Filipović (yellow card) 34'; Šoljić (yellow card) 47'; Andrea Ottochian 57' (yellow card) 78'	Stadium: Stadion Maksimir; Attendance: 470; Referee: (Croatia) Igor Križarić

30 August 2015 Match 8	NK Inter Zaprešić	0 - 2	Hajduk Split	Zaprešić
20:00 EET	Tomislav Mazalović (yellow card) 15'; Komorski (yellow card) 43' (yellow-red card); Nestorovski (yellow card) 51'; Ivan Čeliković (yellow card) 69'	Summary	Balić 5'; Jefferson (yellow card) 7'; Milović (yellow card) 58'; Ohandza 69'; Kalinić (yellow card) 71'; Milić (yellow card) 75'	Stadium: Stadion ŠRC Zaprešić; Attendance: 1,839; Referee: (Croatia) Ivan Bebek
