= Stadionul Emilian Pavel =

Stadium in Ghiroda, Romania

- Interactive map of Stadionul Emilian Pavel
- Address: Str. Herculane
- Location: Ghiroda, Romania
- Coordinates: 45°46′09.9″N 21°18′04.4″E
- Owner: Commune of Ghiroda
- Operator: CSC Ghiroda
- Capacity: 2,000 (200 seated)
- Surface: Grass

Construction
- Opened: 2010
- Renovated: 2017

Tenant
- CSC Ghiroda (2010–present)

Stadionul Emilian Pavel is a multi-purpose stadium in Ghiroda, Romania. It is currently used mostly for football matches and is the home ground of CSC Ghiroda. The stadium holds 2,000 people (200 on seats) and in 2017 was renovated and upgraded, now having a new pitch and a floodlight system.
