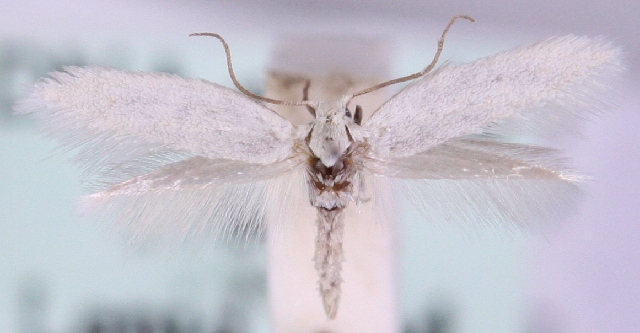

Scientific classification
- Kingdom: Animalia
- Phylum: Arthropoda
- Clade: Pancrustacea
- Class: Insecta
- Order: Lepidoptera
- Family: Elachistidae
- Genus: Elachista
- Species: E. festucicolella

Binomial name
- Elachista festucicolella Zeller, 1853

= Elachista festucicolella =

Species of moth

Elachista festucicolella is a moth of the family Elachistidae. It is found from Sweden to the Alps and from Switzerland to Ukraine and Bulgaria.

The wingspan is 7–9 millimetres (0.28–0.35 in). Adults are on wing from late May to early July.

The larvae feed on Festuca ovina and Festuca rupicola. They mine the leaves of their host plant.
