= Ghiroda Nouă =

Coordinates: 45°45′35.44″N 21°16′9.9″E

Ghiroda Nouă (Hungarian: Újgiroda, also Erzsébetpuszta; (Note: Named after Countess Erzsébet Vay (c. 1680–1748)) German: Neugiroda) is a district of Timișoara, located in the eastern part of the city, north of the Bega Canal. Originally called Colonia Crișan (Hungarian: Krizsántelep; German: Krischan Kolonie), it is located on the lands that, around 1750, were the rice fields of Timișoara. It was annexed to the city in 1949.

== History ==
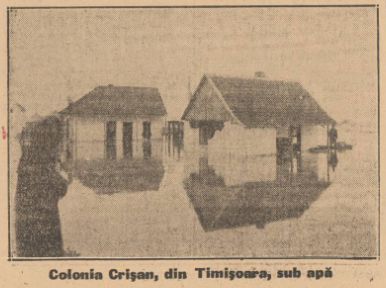
Colonia Crișan during the 1932 floods

Today's district was established on 23 September 1932 by detaching Crișan, Bogdan, Ștrand-Gyürki, Cardoș, Schmidt-Szegedi, Șarta and Slavek from the commune of Ghiroda to form the rural commune of Ghiroda Nouă, following Decision no. 24,768 of 23 September 1932 of the prefecture of Timiș-Torontal County. The new locality was part of the central plasă of the county and formed a notarial constituency with the commune of Ghiroda. In 1936, the localities of Ștrand-Gyürki, Cardoș, Schmidt-Szegedi, Șarta and Slavek separated from Ghiroda Nouă to form the locality of I. G. Duca (today Plopi).

At the 1941 census, Ghiroda Nouă had 353 buildings and 1,253 inhabitants. Due to the fact that the ground level is lower in the area, the district was flooded by Behela in 1932 and 1940, with the 1940 floods requiring the evacuation of 300 homes.
