= Plopi, Timișoara =

Coordinates: 45°44′31.14″N 21°16′10.66″E

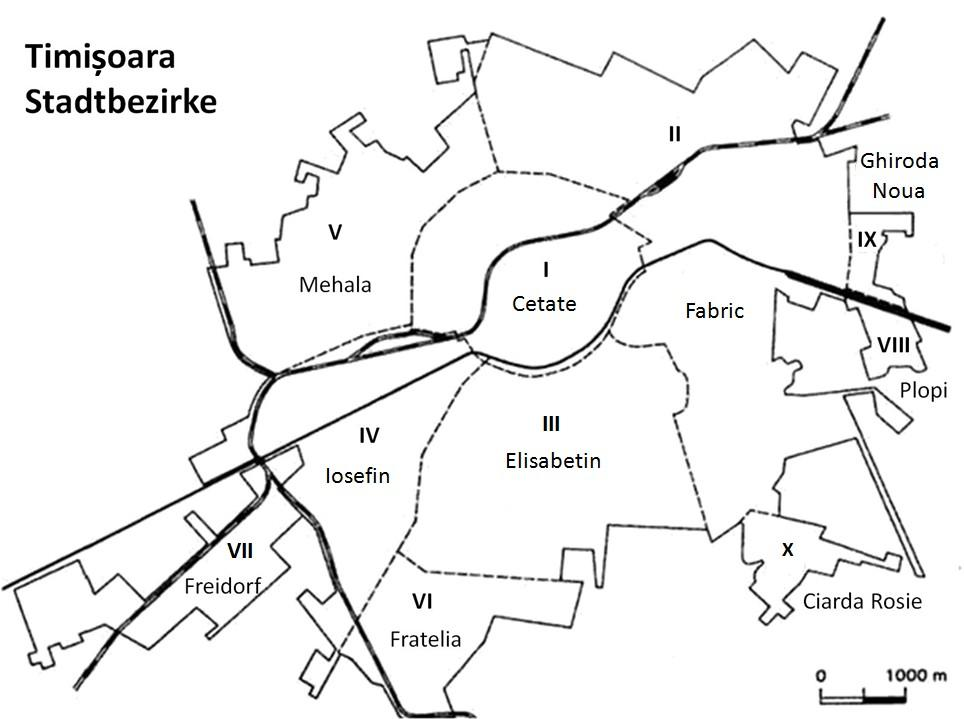
Plopi is the 8th traditional constituency of Timișoara.

Plopi (Hungarian: Kardostelep; German: Kardosch Kolonie), formerly known as I. G. Duca, is a district of Timișoara, Romania. Before becoming a district of Timișoara, it was an independent settlement. It was annexed to Timișoara together with Ghiroda Nouă in 1949.

It has seven main streets that start from the Bega River. Local landmarks include the hydroelectic plant, the Aquatim water treatment plant, the Rudolf Walther children's village, and the Enel power transformer station.

== History ==
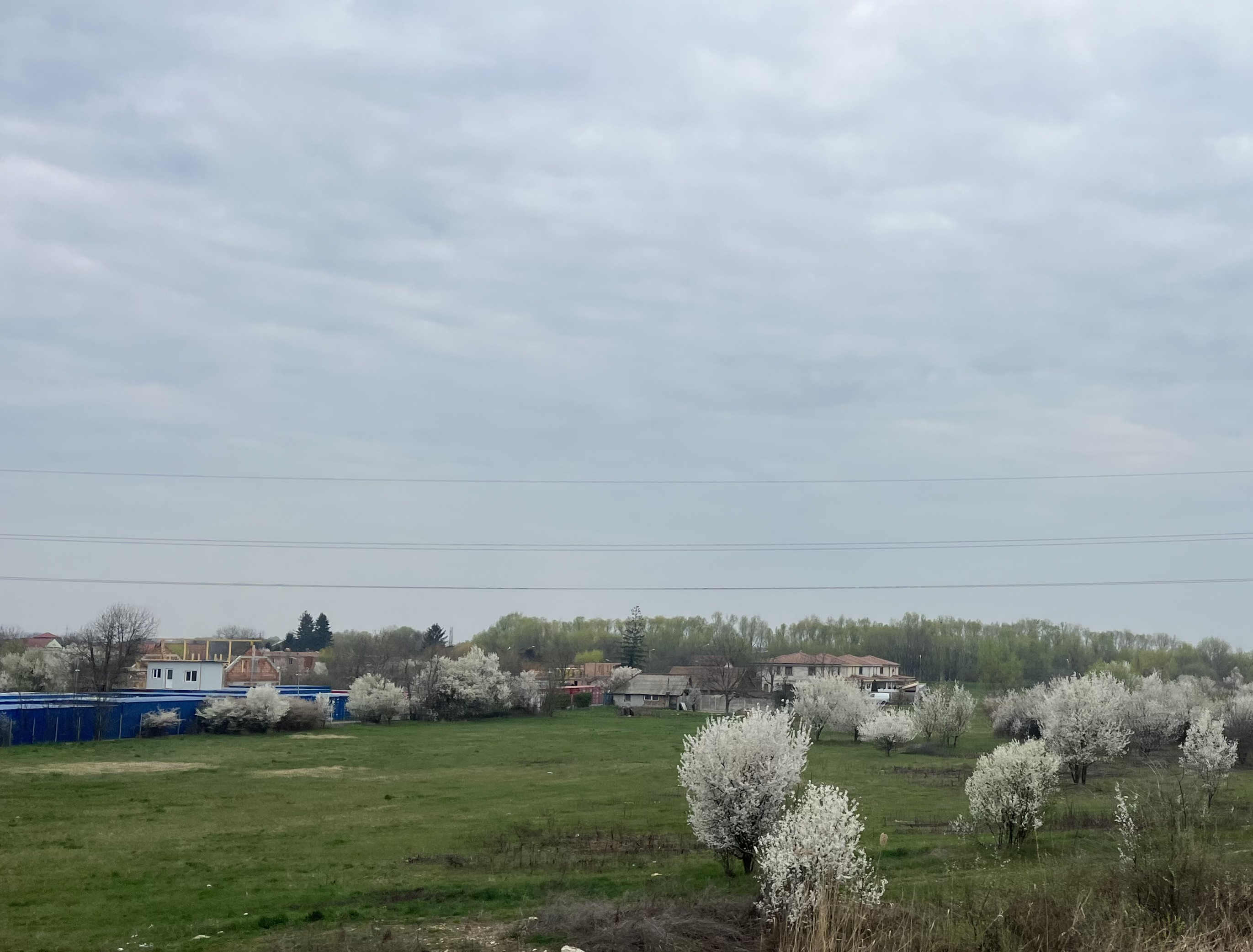
New constructions in Plopi

Before 1918, most of the land was owned by née Malva Klaritz, the widow of Count László Gyürky. She apportioned the land for a fee to those who wanted it, her name appearing in the land register of Ghiroda commune until the 2000s. In the 1930 census, the localities of Ștrand-Gyürki, Cardoș, Schmidt-Szegedi, Șarta and Slavek, which will form the future district, were part of the Ghiroda commune. They separated, together with the localities of Crișan and Bogdan, on 23 September 1932 to form the commune of Ghiroda Nouă, following Decision no. 24,768 of 23 September 1932 of the prefecture of Timiș-Torontal County. In 1936, Ștrand-Gyürki, Cardoș, Schmidt-Szegedi, Șarta and Slavek separated from Ghiroda Nouă to form what was then known as I. G. Duca (after Romanian prime minister Ion G. Duca). By 1941, it was known as Plopi (name suggested by sculptor and local Romulus Ladea) and was the seat of the homonymous commune with 334 buildings and 1,201 inhabitants.

=== Kardostelep ===
It was established in 1926, when the place was arable land belonging to the heirs of the Gyürky estate. It was located on the edge of Ghiroda and stretched to the back of Gyürky Strand. The 17-hectare land was purchased by József Kardos, an innkeeper from Arad, together with Mózes Sere, a real estate agent from Arad, and Ödön Frischmann, a real estate agent from Timișoara, for the sum of 1.2 million lei, with the intention of parceling it out and building houses for sale or for rent.

Kardos obtained the parceling permit and quickly portioned the land and started organizational work. Despite the promising prospects, disagreements arose between partners, which resulted in complaints against Kardos and the indictment of the two real estate agents for false accusation and perjury. Kardos resumed his activity in the colony, but the economic crisis strongly affected the incomes of those who had moved here, being no longer able to pay their rents and loans. This led to litigations and formal proceedings, while the business failed and Kardos became bankrupt.
