= 2017 Cupa României final =

- Event: 2016–17 Cupa României
Voluntari	Astra Giurgiu
1	1
- Voluntari won 5–3 after penalties
- Date: 27 May 2017
- Venue: Ilie Oană, Ploiești
- Referee: István Kovács
- Attendance: 9,274

The Cupa României final was the final match of the 2016–17 Cupa României, played between FC Voluntari and Astra Giurgiu. Voluntari won the match, 5–3 after penalties.

== Match ==
27 May 2017
19:45

Voluntari (1)	1–1 (a.e.t.)	Astra Giurgiu (1)
Marinescu 84' (pen.)		Ioniță 35'
Penalties
Bălan (penalty scored); Marinescu (penalty scored); Voduț (penalty scored); Ivanovici (penalty scored); Achim (penalty scored)	5–3	(penalty scored) Fabrício; (penalty scored) Săpunaru; (penalty scored) Seto; (penalty missed) Stan

Ilie Oană, Ploiești
Attendance: 9,274
Referee: István Kovács (Carei)

FC Voluntari	Astra Giurgiu

GK	22	(Romania) Dragoș Balauru
RB	24	(Romania) Vasile Maftei (c)
CB	28	(Romania) Ionuț Balaur
CB	25	(Romania) Lucian Cazan		(substituted off) 63'
LB	87	(Romania) Florin Acsinte
DM	8	(Romania) Daniel Novac		(substituted off) 76'
DM	15	(Romania) Costin Lazăr	(yellow card) 80'
RM	11	(Romania) Mihai Căpățînă	(yellow card) 49'
CM	20	(Romania) Laurențiu Marinescu
LM	59	(Romania) Doru Popadiuc		(substituted off) 46'
FW	90	(Romania) Adrian Bălan	(yellow card) 114'
Substitutes:
CM	7	(Romania) Petre Ivanovici	(yellow card) 52'	(substituted on) 46'
RB	2	(Romania) Cosmin Achim		(substituted on) 63'
FW	9	(Romania) Mihai Voduț		(substituted on) 76'
Manager:
(Romania) Claudiu Niculescu

GK	1	(Romania) Silviu Lung Jr.
RB	77	(Romania) Alexandru Stan	(yellow card) 106'
CB	22	(Romania) Cristian Săpunaru	(yellow card) 88'
CB	4	(Brazil) Fabrício
LB	13	(Brazil) Júnior Morais (c)
DM	8	(Japan) Takayuki Seto
DM	20	(Romania) Florin Lovin		(substituted off) 79'
RM	31	(Romania) Alexandru Ioniță
AM	10	(Romania) Constantin Budescu
LM	80	(Portugal) Filipe Teixeira		(substituted off) 62'
FW	9	(Romania) Sergiu Buș	(yellow card) 63'	(substituted off) 75'
Substitutes:
LM	17	(Romania) Viorel Nicoară		(substituted on) 62'
FW	11	(Romania) Daniel Florea		(substituted on) 75'
DM	71	(Romania) Andrei Pițian		(substituted on) 79'
Manager:
(Romania) Marius Șumudică

MAN OF THE MATCH

- (Romania) Cosmin Achim (FC Voluntari)

MATCH OFFICIALS

- Assistant referees:
  - Vasile Marinescu
  - Mircea Grigoriu
- Fourth official:
  - Alexandru Tudor
- Additional assistant referees:

MATCH RULES

- 90 minutes.
- 30 minutes of extra-time if necessary.
- Penalty shoot-out if scores still level.
- Seven named substitutes.
- Maximum of three substitutions.

== See also ==
- 2017 Cupa Ligii final
