= CSC Ghiroda =

Romanian football club

- Full name: Club Sportiv Comunal; Ghiroda & Giarmata Vii
- Nicknames: Ghirodanii (The Ghiroda People); Galben-albaștrii (The Yellow and Blues)
- Short name: Ghiroda
- Founded: 2010; 16 years ago as ACS Ghiroda
- Ground: Emilian Pavel
- Capacity: 2,000 (200 seated)
- Owner: Ghiroda Commune
- Chairman: Marius Poclid
- Manager: Iulian Muntean
- League: Liga III
- 2025–26: Liga III, Seria VII, 6th
Home colours	Away colours

Club Sportiv Comunal Ghiroda & Giarmata Vii, commonly known as CSC Ghiroda, or simply as Ghiroda, is a Romanian football club based in Ghiroda, Timiș County. The club was established in 2010, under the name of ACS Ghiroda and knew recent important progress in the Romanian football league system, especially due to good economic situation of the commune, as part of the expansion of Timișoara metropolitan area.

== History ==
=== First years and ascension (2010–present) ===
CSC Ghiroda was established in 2010, under the name of ACS Ghiroda and in the first ten years of activity had important progress in the Romanian football league system, especially due to good economic situation of the commune, as part of the expansion of Timișoara metropolitan area. Ghiroda was enrolled for the first time in the Liga V (fifth tier), in the summer of 2011, then at the end of the first season, "ghirodanii" were ranked 1st, with 15 points ahead the second place, FC Jebel, obtaining the promotion to Liga IV. In the next season, the team based near Timișoara was close to a second consecutive promotion, but finally it was ranked 2nd, after the second team of Nuova Mama Mia Becicherecu Mic.

2013–14 season brought a great performance for the young football club, which won the Timiș County series of the Liga IV, with only one point ahead Politehnica Timișoara, the most honoured football club in the Banat historical region and one of the traditional football clubs in Romania, which played in that season at the level of fourth tier due to 2012 bankruptcy of the club. As the champion of Timiș County, Ghiroda went to the promotion play-offs, but failed to make another step up, after a defeat on penalties, against Industria Galda (Alba County champion). Next two seasons, Ghiroda was ranked 3rd and missed any chance to promote to the third division, then at the end of the 2016–17 season, the club near Timișoara won Timiș Series of the fourth tier and the promotion play-offs, against Inter Petrila (Hunedoara County champion) and promoted to Liga III, for the first time in the recent history of the club.

At the end of the first season, "ghirodanii" ended 9th, out of 15 and saved from relegation, then in the summer of 2018, ACS Ghiroda was re-branded as CSC Ghiroda & Giarmata Vii, also changing the club colors from white and blue to yellow and blue. At the end of the 2018–19 season, the team was again in trouble, but avoided the relegation in the last round. After this season, followed another two with better results and the "yellow and blues" were ranked 8th and 5th, somehow stabilizing at this level.

== Ground ==
CSC Ghiroda played its home matches on Emilian Pavel Stadium, in Ghiroda, Timiș County, a stadium with a capacity of only 200 seats, but with good conditions, including a floodlight system.

== Honours ==
Liga III

- Winners (1): 2023–24
- Runners-up (1): 2021–22

Liga IV – Timiș County

- Winners (2): 2013–14, 2016–17
- Runners-up (1): 2012–13

Liga V – Timiș County

- Winners (1): 2011–12

Cupa României – Timiș County

- Winners (1): 2015–16
- Runners-up (1): 2014–15

== Players ==
=== First-team squad ===
As of 10 September 2024

Note: Flags indicate national team as defined under FIFA eligibility rules; some limited exceptions apply. Players may hold more than one non-FIFA nationality.

No.	Pos.	Nation	Player
1	GK	ROU	David Flonta
2	DF	ROU	Dragoș Coroiu
3	DF	ROU	Bogdan Șteta
4	DF	ROU	Rareș Butnărașu
5	DF	ROU	Răzvan Cluci
6	DF	ROU	Denis Tătaru (on loan from Poli Timișoara)
7	MF	ROU	Cosmin Mancaș (Captain)
8	MF	ROU	Gabriel Stoi
9	FW	ROU	Alexandru Popovici
10	MF	ROU	Darius Buia
11	MF	ROU	Sebastian Velcotă
13	GK	ROU	Gheorghe Stoianov
14	MF	ITA	Alessandro Vaccari
15	FW	ROU	Alexandru Buțu

No.	Pos.	Nation	Player
16	DF	ROU	Harald Fridrich
17	MF	ROU	Andrei Lixandru
18	MF	ROU	Sorin Miclău
19	DF	ROU	Dragoș Datcu
20	MF	ROU	David Gulei
22	MF	ROU	Petrișor Jichici
23	MF	ROU	Gabriel Precup
24	DF	ROU	Adrian Ilie
25	MF	ROU	Fabio Trip
30	MF	ROU	Călin Ciobanu
84	MF	ROU	David Pop
97	DF	ROU	Mircea Stupu
99	GK	ROU	Tudor Ciocan

=== Out on loan ===
Note: Flags indicate national team as defined under FIFA eligibility rules; some limited exceptions apply. Players may hold more than one non-FIFA nationality.

No. / Pos. / Nation / Player	No. / Pos. / Nation / Player

== Club officials ==
=== Board of directors ===
Role	Name
Owner	(Romania) Ghiroda Commune
President	(Romania) Marius Poclid
Sporting director	(Romania) Daniel Borchescu
Head of Youth Development	(Romania) Alin Miloș
Delegate	(Romania) Elty Neagoe

=== Current technical staff ===
Role	Name
Manager	(Romania) Iulian Muntean
Assistant manager	(Romania) Dan Cluci
Goalkeeping coach	(Romania) Gheorghe Stoianov
Masseur	(Romania) Adrian Blaj

== League history ==
Season	Tier	Division	Place	Notes	Cupa României
2025–26	3	Liga III (Seria VII)	TBD		
2024–25	3	Liga III (Seria IX)	3rd		
2023–24	3	Liga III (Seria VII)	1st (C)		
2022–23	3	Liga III (Seria VIII)	3rd		
2021–22	3	Liga III (Seria VII)	2nd		2nd Round
2020–21	3	Liga III (Seria VII)	5th		4th Round
2019–20	3	Liga III (Seria IV)	8th		4th Round
2018–19	3	Liga III (Seria IV)	11th		3rd Round

Season	Tier	Division	Place	Notes	Cupa României
2017–18	3	Liga III (Seria IV)	9th		Preliminary Round
2016–17	4	Liga IV (TM)	1st (C, P)	Promoted	2nd Round
2015–16	4	Liga IV (TM)	3rd		Preliminary Round
2014–15	4	Liga IV (TM)	3rd		Preliminary Round
2013–14	4	Liga IV (TM)	1st (C)		Preliminary Round
2012–13	4	Liga IV (TM)	2nd		Preliminary Round
2011–12	5	Liga V (TM)	1st (C, P)	Promoted	Preliminary Round
