= Sandu Iovu =

Romanian footballer

Personal information
- Full name: Sandu Ciprian Iovu
- Date of birth: 26 January 1996 (age 30)
- Place of birth: Hunedoara, Romania
- Position: Forward

Team information
- Current team: Popești-Leordeni
- Number: 77

Youth career
- Ceahlăul Piatra Neamț

Senior career*
| Years | Team | Apps | (Gls) |
| 2013–2015 | Ceahlăul Piatra Neamț | 12 | (0) |
| 2016 | Metalurgistul Cugir | | |
| 2016 | Unirea Dej | | |
| 2017 | Sepsi OSK | 6 | (1) |
| 2018–2019 | Știința Miroslava | 16 | (3) |
| 2019 | Energeticianul | 6 | (0) |
| 2019 | Odorheiu Secuiesc | | |
| 2020 | Cetate Deva | | |
| 2020– | Popești-Leordeni | | |
| 2021 | FC Adunatii Copaceni | | |
- * Club domestic league appearances and goals as of 6 October 2021

Sandu Ciprian Iovu (born 26 January 1996) is a Romanian professional footballer who played as a forward for F.C. Adunatii Copaceni.

He is currently without a club and is a free agent.
