= Sebastian Velcotă =

Romanian footballer

Personal information
- Full name: Sebastian Darius Velcotă
- Date of birth: 20 March 1998 (age 28)
- Place of birth: Bozovici, Romania
- Height: 1.78 m (5 ft 10 in)
- Position: Midfielder

Team information
- Current team: Ghiroda
- Number: 11

Youth career
- LPS Banatul Timișoara
- –2015: ACS Poli Timișoara

Senior career*
Years	Team	Apps	(Gls)
2015–2019	ACS Poli Timișoara	20	(0)
2015	→ CSM Lugoj (loan)	12	(3)
2017	→ CSMȘ Reșița (loan)	13	(1)
2019	CSMȘ Reșița	11	(2)
2019	ACS Poli Timișoara	0	(0)
2020	Cetate Deva	1	(0)
2020–2021	Pandurii Târgu Jiu	24	(1)
2021–2023	CSM Reșița	50	(9)
2024	Deva	11	(0)
2024–	Ghiroda	0	(0)

International career
2014	Romania U17	1	(0)
- * Club domestic league appearances and goals as of 12:47, 7 November 2024 (UTC)

Sebastian Darius Velcotă (born 20 March 1998) is a Romanian professional footballer who plays as a midfielder for CSC Ghiroda.

== Honours ==
ACS Poli Timișoara

- Liga II: 2014–15

CSM Reșița

- Liga III: 2018–19, 2021–22, 2022–23
