= Olivier Lusamba =

Congolese professional footballer (born 1993)

Personal information
- Full name: Olivier Christophe Lusamba
- Date of birth: 16 March 1993 (age 33)
- Place of birth: Metz, France
- Height: 1.88 m (6 ft 2 in)
- Position: Striker

Team information
- Current team: FC Hagondange
- Number: 8

Youth career
- Nancy

Senior career*
Years	Team	Apps	(Gls)
2010–2012	Nancy II	14	(2)
2012–2013	Zamora	14	(2)
2013–2014	Amnéville	13	(9)
2014	Boulogne	8	(0)
2015	OH Leuven	1	(0)
2015–2016	Eendracht Aalst	28	(6)
2016–2017	Épinal	10	(2)
2017	Olimpia Satu Mare	20	(8)
2018	ASU Politehnica	6	(0)
2018–2020	Rumelange	23	(6)
2021–2022	Illkirch-Graffenstaden	15	(1)
2023–	FC Hagondange		

International career
2013–2014	DR Congo U21	2	(0)
- * Club domestic league appearances and goals as of 12 March 2018

Olivier Christophe Lusamba (born 16 March 1993) is a professional footballer who plays as a striker who currently plays for French amateur club FC Hagondange. Born in France, he represented DR Congo at youth level.

Lusamba started his career at Nancy, playing then for the Spanish club Zamora, French clubs: Amnéville, Boulogne and Épinal and in Belgium for OH Leuven and Eendracht Aalst. In the summer of 2017 Lusamba transferred in Romania at Olimpia Satu Mare for which he scored 8 goals in 20 matches. In the winter break of the season, Olimpia retired from Liga II, after having encountered major financial problems and Olivier signed with ASU Politehnica.

== International career ==
Lusamba played for DR Congo U-21 in 2 matches and did not score any goals.
