= Rodemis Trifu =

Romanian footballer

Personal information
- Full name: Rodemis Dantes Trifu
- Date of birth: 8 October 1995 (age 31)
- Place of birth: Craiova, Romania
- Height: 1.78 m (5 ft 10 in)
- Position: Midfielder

Team information
- Current team: Filiași

Youth career
- –2014: Pandurii Târgu Jiu

Senior career*
Years	Team	Apps	(Gls)
2014–2015	Pandurii II Târgu Jiu	?	(?)
2014–2017	Pandurii Târgu Jiu	26	(0)
2018–	Filiași		
- * Club domestic league appearances and goals as of 31 August 2018

Rodemis Dantes Trifu (born 8 October 1995) is a Romanian professional footballer who plays as a midfielder for CSO Filiași.
