= Ciprian Răduțoiu =

Romanian footballer

Personal information
- Full name: Ciprian Gheorghe Răduțoiu
- Date of birth: 19 February 1987 (age 39)
- Place of birth: Bacău, Romania
- Position: Defender

Team information
- Current team: KSE Târgu Secuiesc

Youth career
- FCM Bacău

Senior career*
| Years | Team | Apps | (Gls) |
| 2008–2009 | Jiul Petroșani | 2 | (2) |
| 2009–2010 | FCM Bacău | 34 | (2) |
| 2010–2013 | SC Bacău | 53 | (8) |
| 2014–2017 | Sepsi OSK | 24 | (0) |
| 2018 | SR Brașov | 21 | (2) |
| 2019 | AFC Hărman | | |
| 2019– | KSE Târgu Secuiesc | | |
- * Club domestic league appearances and goals as of 3 August 2020

Ciprian Gheorghe Răduțoiu (born 19 February 1987) is a Romanian professional footballer who plays as a defender for KSE Târgu Secuiesc.
