= Darius Buia =

Romanian footballer

Personal information
- Full name: Darius Grazian Buia
- Date of birth: 30 April 1994 (age 32)
- Place of birth: Antwerp, Belgium
- Height: 1.76 m (5 ft 9 in)
- Position: Midfielder

Team information
- Current team: Ghiroda
- Number: 10

Youth career
- 2002–2004: Poli AEK Timișoara
- 2004–2011: LPS Banatul Timișoara

Senior career*
Years	Team	Apps	(Gls)
2011–2014	Dinamo II București	48	(15)
2013–2017	Dinamo București	3	(0)
2014–2016	→ Academica Clinceni (loan)	19	(3)
2017	Poli Timișoara	0	(0)
2017	Gloria LT Cermei	11	(7)
2018	UTA Arad	14	(9)
2018–2019	Sportul Snagov	27	(7)
2019–2021	Viitorul Târgu Jiu	34	(13)
2021–2022	Petrolul Ploiești	6	(1)
2022–2023	Gloria Bistrița	24	(6)
2023–	Ghiroda	21	(10)

International career
2010–2011	Romania U-17	9	(2)
2012	Romania U-19	3	(1)
- * Club domestic league appearances and goals as of 12:45, 7 November 2024 (UTC)

Darius Grazian Buia (born 30 April 1994) is a Romanian footballer who plays as a midfielder for CSC Ghiroda.

== Personal life ==
Darius Buia is the son of former Romanian international Romulus Buia.
