= Ghiroda =

- Commune
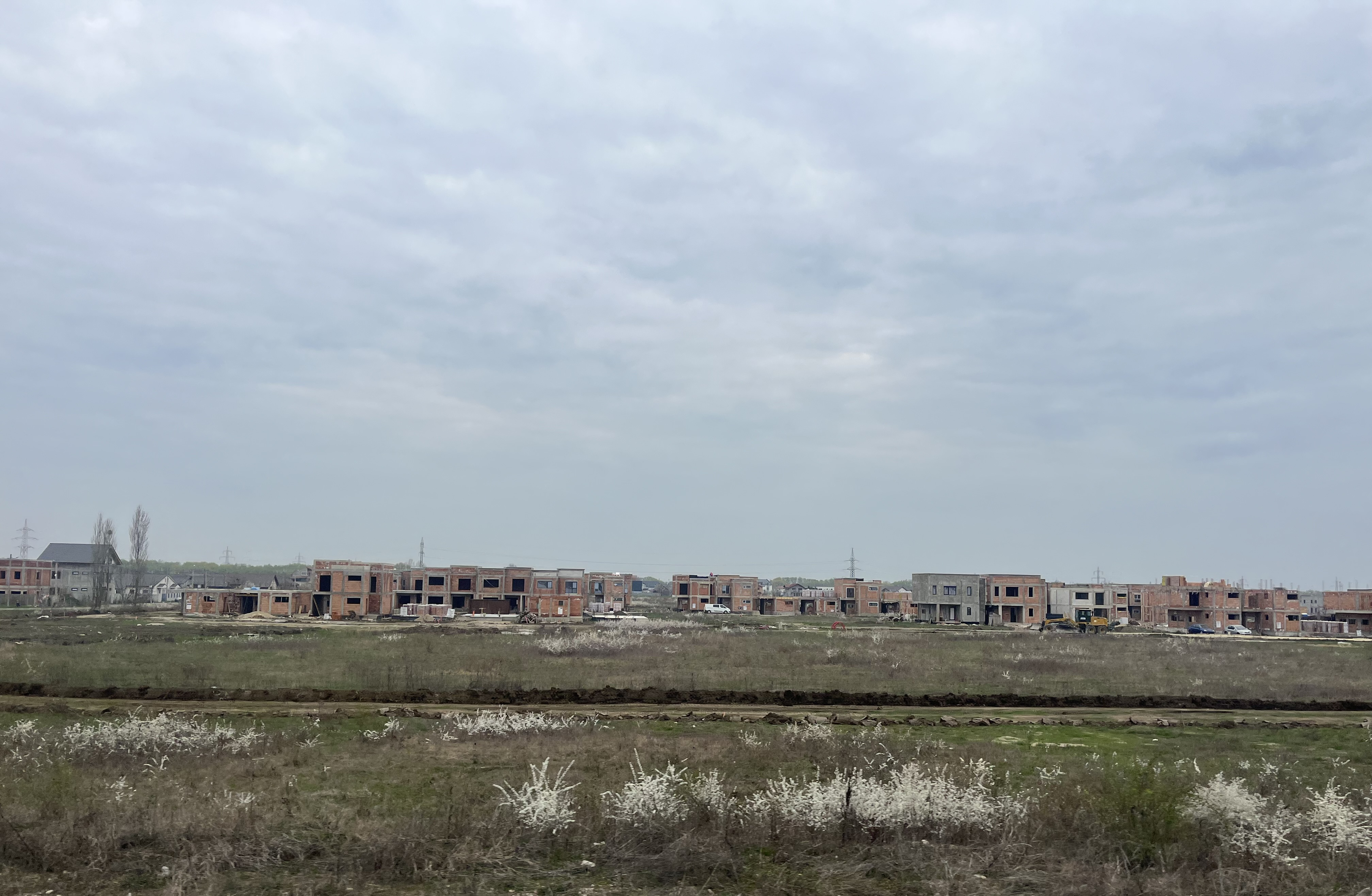

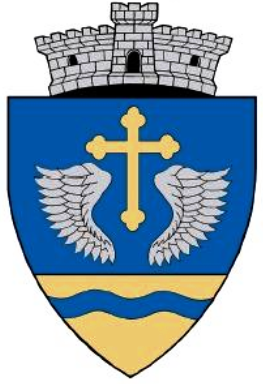
- Coat of arms

- Location in Timiș County

- Location in Romania
- Coordinates: 45°46′N 21°18′E
- Country: Romania
- County: Timiș

Government
  - Mayor (2016–): Ionuț Stănușoiu (PNL)
- Area: 35 km^{2} (14 sq mi)
- Population (2021-12-01): 8,866
  - Density: 250/km^{2} (660/sq mi)
- Time zone: UTC+02:00 (EET)
  - Summer (DST): UTC+03:00 (EEST)
- Postal code: 307200–307201
- Vehicle reg.: TM
- Website: primariaghiroda.ro

Ghiroda (Hungarian: Győröd; German: Altgiroda, as opposed to Neugiroda, now a district of Timișoara; Serbian: Гирода, romanized: Giroda) is a commune in Timiș County, Romania. It is composed of two villages, Ghiroda (commune seat) and Giarmata-Vii. It is located near Timișoara, to the east. As a result of the development of the city, the commune shows characteristics of being a suburb of Timișoara.

== Location ==
Ghiroda is located in the center of Timiș County, a few kilometers northeast of Timișoara, with which it borders. In practice, Ghiroda is attached to Timișoara. It is bounded to the south by the Bega Canal. To the west, it connects to Timișoara through two streets that continue in the urban fabric of the municipality.

== Etymology ==
The village's name originates from the Hungarian personal name Gyury, a diminutive form of Győrgy (equivalent to Gheorghe). However, the medieval form Gyüreg may also have Slavic roots, possibly derived from the Serbian name Đurađ or its dialectal variant Đuređ.

== Geography ==
=== Relief ===
From a geomorphological perspective, the territory of Ghiroda commune belongs to the expansive Western Plain (also known as the Tisa Plain). The northern area of the commune lies within the Vinga sub-hilly plain, while the southern area extends into the actual meadow of the Beghei (Bega) River. The northernmost section forms a south-facing spur that descends toward the Bega meadow. This meadow constitutes the river's major bed, which, prior to the construction of dams and flow regulation systems, was prone to frequent flooding.

The plain has an elevation ranging from 90 to 97 meters, while the meadow varies between 90 and 91 meters. The overall average altitude is around 93–94 meters, with a gentle slope descending from the north to the south of the commune, and from east to southwest. The plain features a predominantly flat terrain with slight irregularities, including broad micro-depressions. In the northern part of the commune, the landscape is intersected by several small, narrow valleys separated by flat areas, such as Valea Izvorului. The meadow exhibits minor elevation differences and is characterized by numerous parasitic meanders, particularly on the left bank of the Bega River, locally known as Balta I and Balta a II-a.

=== Hydrography ===
The territory of Ghiroda commune lies within the Bega River watershed, with the river flowing through the southern part of the commune. Its flow is regulated, resulting in minimal fluctuations in water levels. The Bega Meadow features meanders and stagnant water pools.

The northern plain features several narrow micro-valleys that converge toward the meadow and extend close to the Bega River. In this area, small swampy depressions are also present, characterized by shallow groundwater levels—sometimes as little as one meter or less. Overall, the groundwater in the region is generally close to the surface: it lies at depths of 1–2 meters in the plain, 0.5–1 meter in minor depressions, and less than 0.5 meters in former river meanders. Due to poor natural drainage, water often accumulates in puddles, prompting the construction of an extensive network of canals that span the entire plain to manage excess water.

The primary watercourse in the area is the Beghei (Bega) River, which originates in the Poiana Ruscă Mountains. It flows through the southern part of Ghiroda, continues into Timișoara, and eventually empties into the Tisa River in Serbia, near the town of Titel. The river spans a total length of 330 km. Historically, the river was known by different names along its course: Timișel from its source to Timișoara, Timișul Mic between Timișoara and Cenei, and Temesici or Temesat from Cenei to Jaša Tomić in Serbia. In 1720, the beds of the Timiș and Timișul Mic rivers were separated, and the latter was renamed the Bega (Bega Canal).

=== Flora ===
The vegetation belongs to the forest-steppe type, featuring scattered forest patches such as the Green Forest and Bistra Forest. The northern plain is dominated by mesoxerophilic herbaceous plants, while the meadow areas showcase a mix of hydrophilic vegetation and mesophilous groups. The forest patches contain woody species including various oaks (Quercus pubescens, Quercus robur, Quercus cerris), with Quercus frainetto being particularly prominent. Other tree species present are ash (Fraxinus excelsior), hornbeam, elm, and occasionally beech. In the meadow zones, softwood species like Salix × fragilis, Salix alba, Populus alba, Populus nigra, and Alnus glutinosa are common. The plain's grassy vegetation consists of species such as Setaria glauca, Setaria viridis, Cynodon dactylon, combined with Festuca pseudovina, Festuca sulcata, and Lolium perenne. In small depressions, hydrophilic species like Carex pilosa, Alopecurus pratensis, Plantago major, and Plantago media thrive. Meadow grasses are mainly Alopecurus pratensis, Festuca sulcata, Carex vulpina, Juncus sp., Potentilla recta, and Trifolium hybridum. Areas with solonetz soils and salinization support halophilic plants such as Puccinellia distans and Plantago schwartzenbergiana, while depressions with mild salinization are home to Trifolium fragiferum.

=== Fauna ===
As a result of increasing human activity and generally poor ecological conditions, the local fauna is primarily composed of rodent vertebrates, such as the hamster (Cricetus sp.), European hare (Lepus europaeus), Hungarian blind mole-rat (Spalax hungaricus), and the European ground squirrel (Spermophilus citellus). Aquatic habitats support species like the otter (Lutra lutra), perch (Perca fluviatilis), zander (Sander lucioperca), rudd (Scardinius erythrophthalmus), catfish (Silurus glanis), pike (Esox lucius), and various types of carp—including mirror and leather carp (Cyprinus carpio), crucian carp (Carassius carassius), bream (Abramis brama), and weatherfish (Misgurnus fossilis), among others. Amphibians such as the smooth newt (Triturus vulgaris), fire salamander (Salamandra salamandra), and various frog species (Rana sp.) are also found in and around aquatic areas. However, reptile species like the grass snake (Natrix natrix) and dice snake (Natrix tessellata) are becoming increasingly rare.

In the open fields, numerous lizards (Lacerta viridis), partridges (Perdix perdix), and quails (Coturnix sp.) can be found. Among birds of prey, species such as the northern goshawk (Accipiter gentilis) and the Eurasian sparrowhawk (Accipiter nisus) are observed occasionally, along with migratory raptors like the peregrine falcon (Falco peregrinus), the hobby (Falco subbuteo), and the common kestrel (Falco tinnunculus). Near the two forested areas, other bird species are present, including the common buzzard (Buteo buteo), various hawks (Strix genus), the Eurasian eagle-owl (Bubo bubo), the little owl (Athene noctua), the common pheasant (Phasianus colchicus), and the black stork (Ciconia nigra), which nests on a few rooftops. Swallows are particularly abundant in summer, especially the common swift (Apus apus), which nests under the eaves of houses. The most widespread bird in the area is the house sparrow (Passer domesticus).

Among the mammals commonly found in the area are the red fox (Vulpes vulpes), badger (Meles meles), polecat (Mustela putorius), wild boar (Sus scrofa), water vole (Arvicola terrestris), and groups of roe deer (Capreolus capreolus). Also frequently encountered are the European hedgehog (Erinaceus europaeus), the European mole (Talpa europaea), and various species of mice, particularly the house mouse (Mus musculus).

=== Climate ===
The territory of Ghiroda commune experiences a climate with an average annual rainfall of 631 mm/m² and an average annual temperature of 10.9°C. During the summer months, the average temperature reaches 20.6°C, while in the winter months it drops to around 0.2°C. The highest recorded temperature was 40°C on 16 August 1952, and the lowest was -29°C on 13 February 1935.

There are, on average, 100 tropical summer days per year in Ghiroda, with average daily temperatures exceeding 25°C, and 40 tropical days where temperatures rise above 30°C.

Frost occurs on approximately 47.6 days per year, typically distributed as follows: 3.2 days in April, 4.4 days in October, and the remaining frost days occurring between October and April. The first autumn frost generally appears around 4 October, with the last one around 21 November. In spring, the first frost usually occurs around 23 March, with the last frost around 19 May. On average, the final spring frost is recorded around 15 April.

The number of days with temperatures below 0°C totals 91 per year. Precipitation is recorded on an average of 105.9 days annually. Extreme rainfall events have also been observed—for instance, on 14 July 1955, a torrential downpour delivered 70.4 mm of rain over 503 minutes, with an intensity of 0.14 mm per minute. The highest recorded precipitation in a 24-hour period was 100 mm/m² in April 1915. Between 1 March and 31 October, average precipitation amounts to 453 mm. Snowfall contributes an average snow layer thickness of 36.7 mm per year. Relative humidity averages 74% annually, with the lowest monthly average of 62% occurring in July and the highest, 88%, in December.

The De Martonne aridity index stands at 30.2, indicating a generally humid climate. However, moisture deficits are observed in July (22.7 mm), August (20.4 mm), and September (21.0 mm), with all three months falling below the threshold for dryness.

The wind regime is dominated by winds from the north (16.9%) and east (15%), while calm conditions are recorded on 20.9% of days. The highest wind speeds were measured at 3.8 m/s in the southern sector and 3.4 m/s in the northern sector.

== History ==
The oldest traces of habitation discovered on the current administrative territory of Ghiroda date from the Eneolithic. In 2015, a site was discovered in the vicinity of the Timișoara–Lugoj railway, on a 90-meter-high (300 ft) terrace. Here were highlighted fragments of pottery attributed to the Gornești–Bodrogkeresztúr culture, which attest to an important habitation, in a settlement probably arranged on an island surrounded by water. Recent research has also shown traces of habitation from other eras: the Bronze Age, Roman Dacia (2nd–3rd centuries AD) and, especially, the Middle Ages, when the habitation of this area became uninterrupted to this day.

The first recorded mention of Ghiroda dates from 1332. In 1393 it appears mentioned in a document with the name villa Gyrod, which shows that it was of high importance. Between Ghiroda and Remetea Mare existed in the Middle Ages and at the beginning of the Habsburg period the village of Deg, now extinct. At the 1717 census, it appears with 24 houses and the name Girouda. Count Mercy brought German settlers here, and the village became Romanian-German. Later, Count Perlas tried to introduce rice culture to Ghiroda, but was unsuccessful due to the unclayey soil. It belonged to the Aerarium until 1781, when it was bought by Mihály Sándor, and until 1896 it had several private owners. Hungarian colonists settled in the 19th century and the hearth of the village expanded substantially. In 1931, Ghiroda was a commune and included the Romanian villages of Crișan and Sever Bocu; later, they became part of the hearth of the locality.

The history of Giarmata-Vii is closely related to the neighboring locality Giarmata, to which it belonged and whose inhabitants contributed to the establishment of the new settlement. It is a new locality, as it appears only at the beginning of the 19th century. The Timișoara administration owned several uncultivated lands in the vicinity of the city, which it decided to put up for sale. The land was bought by the inhabitants of the neighboring villages, who became the first inhabitants of Überland. This word of German origin is found in several Banat villages and designates an "overland". In the case of Giarmata-Vii, the term became the proper name of the locality. Under the name of Giarmata-Vii it appears only in 1943. In the beginning, the main occupation of the newly established was viticulture. An important moment for the history of Giarmata-Vii is the year 1948, when its inhabitants submitted to the Timiș-Torontal County Prefecture a memorandum requesting the detachment of the village from the commune of Giarmata and the establishment of a new commune. The memorandum was approved by the first praetor of Plasa Timișoara, Mihai Grivei, who decided to establish a rural commune called Viișoara. The Giarmata mayor's office accepted the decision to detach Giarmata-Vii from Giarmata on 21 February 1948. However, the proceedings did not continue, as the decision was met by the refusal of the Ministry of Internal Affairs. Starting with 1956, Giarmata-Vii is attached to the commune of Ghiroda.

== Demographics ==
Ethnic composition (2021)
1. Romanians (86.7%)
2. Hungarians (1.61%)
3. Unknown (10.2%)
4. Others (1.57%)
Religious composition (2021)
1. Orthodox (73.7%)
2. Pentecostals (5.21%)
3. Roman Catholics (4.57%)
4. Baptists (1.18%)
5. Unknown (12.1%)
6. Others (1.65%)
7. Irreligious, atheists and agnostics (1.62%)

Ghiroda had a population of 8,866 inhabitants at the 2021 census, up 43% from the 2011 census. Most inhabitants are Romanians (86.66%), with a minority of Hungarians (1.61%). For 10.16% of the population, ethnicity is unknown. By religion, most inhabitants are Orthodox (73.67%), but there are also minorities of Pentecostals (5.21%), Roman Catholics (4.57%) and Baptists (1.18%). For 12.1% of the population, religious affiliation is unknown.

Census		Ethnic composition
Year	Population	Romanians	Hungarians	Germans	Serbs
1880	909	742	117	41	1
1890	1,299	975	242	25	23
1900	1,184	774	232	117	9
1910	1,419	851	449	54	17
1920	1,214	708	437	42	–
1930	4,056	1,253	1,742	929	59
1941	1,585 (Note: Ghiroda Nouă and Plopi were split off in 1951, becoming districts of Timișoara.)	850	518	164	–
1956	2,416	1,339	572	476	5
1966	4,307 (Note: Until the 1966 census, Giarmata-Vii was included in Giarmata.)	3,131	627	488	21
1977	5,982	4,947	544	446	14
1992	4,908	4,425	340	51	32
2002	4,907	4,531	260	25	26
2011	6,200	5,565	255	29	45
2021	8,866	7,684	143	35	39

== Politics and administration ==
The commune of Ghiroda is administered by a mayor and a local council composed of 15 councilors. The mayor, Ionuț Stănușoiu, from the National Liberal Party, has been in office since 2016. As from the 2024 local elections, the local council has the following composition by political parties:

Party	Seats	Composition
National Liberal Party	9	
Save Romania Union–People's Movement Party–Force of the Right	3	
Social Democratic Party	2	
Alliance for the Union of Romanians	1	

== Economy ==
The commune's territory has experienced strong urban development in recent years, mainly due to the expansion of Timișoara and the construction of new residential areas and factories on the outskirts of the city.
