= Paul Mateciuc =

Romanian footballer

Personal information
- Full name: Paul Cristian Mateciuc
- Date of birth: 28 May 1995 (age 31)
- Place of birth: Suceava, Romania
- Height: 1.87 m (6 ft 2 in)
- Position: Defender

Team information
- Current team: Bucovina Rădăuți
- Number: 5

Youth career
- Ceahlăul Piatra Neamț

Senior career*
Years	Team	Apps	(Gls)
2013–2015	Ceahlăul Piatra Neamț	1	(0)
2015–2016	Foresta Suceava	3	(1)
2016–2017	FC Zalău	25	(1)
2017	Știința Miroslava	8	(0)
2018–2021	Foresta Suceava	55	(4)
2021–2022	Bucovina Rădăuți	25	(0)
- * Club domestic league appearances and goals as of 06:53, 21 June 2022 (UTC)

Paul Cristian Mateciuc (born 28 May 1995) is a Romanian professional footballer who plays as a defender for Bucovina Rădăuți. Mateciuc made his Liga I debut on 27 May 2015 for Ceahlăul Piatra Neamț in a 0–2 defeat against Universitatea Cluj. He also played for teams such as: FC Zalău or Știința Miroslava.
