= Bruno Luz =

Portuguese footballer

Personal information
- Full name: Bruno Ricardo Rocha da Luz
- Date of birth: 8 December 1988 (age 37)
- Place of birth: Setúbal, Portugal
- Height: 1.83 m (6 ft 0 in)
- Positions: Midfielder; winger

Youth career
- 1996–1997: GD "Os Amarelos"
- 1997–2001: Vitória Setúbal
- 2001–2005: Fulham
- 2005–2006: Yeovil Town
- 2006–2007: Vitória Setúbal

Senior career*
Years	Team	Apps	(Gls)
2007–2010	Fulham	0	(0)
2009–2010	→ QPR (loan)	0	(0)
2010–2013	Apollon Limassol FC	0	(0)
2011–2012	→ Adonis Idaliou (loan)		
2012–2013	→ Ermis Aradippou (loan)	22	(7)
2013–2014	Ermis Aradippou	0	(0)
2013	→ PAEEK (loan)	14	(1)
2014–2015	Anagennisi Deryneia	10	(0)
2015–2017	Hapoel Jerusalem	42	(4)
2017	Enosis Neon Paralimni	0	(0)
2017	Maccabi Ahi Nazareth	1	(0)
2017–2018	Luceafărul Oradea	18	(2)
2018–2019	Radomiak Radom	27	(4)
2020	Partizán Bardejov	1	(0)
2020–2021	Vitória Setúbal	23	(0)
2022	Amora	6	(0)
2022–2023	Ermis Aradippou	23	(9)
- * Club domestic league appearances and goals as of 6 June 2023

Bruno Ricardo Rocha da Luz (born 8 December 1988) is a Portuguese professional footballer who plays as a midfielder.

== Career ==
After failing to make an appearance with English second division club Queens Park Rangers, Luz almost signed with Portsmouth, but the transfer never materialised due to Portsmouth's transfer ban. Later, he signed with Cypriot side Apollon Limassol, before being sent on loan to Ermis Aradippou, as well as PAEEK.

In 2013, he returned to Portugal with Naval, but was unable to play for 5 months because of problems with the Cyprus Football Association.

In 2015, Luz signed for Hapoel Jerusalem in Israel before joining Maccabi Ahi Nazareth.

In 2017, he signed for Romanian outfit Luceafărul Oradea.

In 2018, Luz signed for Polish second division side Radomiak Radom, where he claimed the quality was higher than in England, before sealing a move to Partizán Bardejov in the Slovak second division.

== Honours ==
Radomiak Radom

- II liga: 2018–19
