= Paul Hodea =

Romanian footballer

Personal information
- Full name: Paul Cristian Hodea
- Date of birth: 29 June 1998 (age 28)
- Place of birth: Râmnicu Vâlcea, Romania
- Height: 1.83 m (6 ft 0 in)
- Position: Midfielder

Youth career
- Oltchim Râmnicu Vâlcea
- Râmnicu Vâlcea
- Universitatea Craiova

Senior career*
Years	Team	Apps	(Gls)
2015–2017	Universitatea Craiova	1	(0)
2015–2017	→ Universitatea II Craiova	19	(1)
2018–2019	Hermannstadt	0	(0)
2018–2019	→ Hermannstadt II	14	(3)
2019	→ Viitorul Șelimbăr (loan)	11	(1)
2020	Industria Galda	1	(0)
- * Club domestic league appearances and goals as of 19:20, 9 June 2021 (UTC)

Paul Cristian Hodea (born 29 June 1998) is a Romanian professional footballer who plays as a midfielder. Hodea made his Liga I debut on 29 June 2016 for Universitatea Craiova in a 2–0 win against Petrolul Ploiești.
