= Ivan Blažević =

Croatian footballer

Personal information
- Date of birth: 25 July 1992 (age 34)
- Place of birth: Zagreb, Croatia
- Height: 1.68 m (5 ft 6 in)
- Position: Midfielder

Team information
- Current team: NK Bratstvo Kunovec

Youth career
- –2008: Zrinski Farkaševac
- 2008–2011: Inter Zaprešić

Senior career*
Years	Team	Apps	(Gls)
2011–2018	Inter Zaprešić	136	(16)
2018	Hibernians	6	(0)
2019–2020	NK Savski Marof		
2020	Samobor		
2020–	Bratstvo Kunovec		

International career
2011	Croatia U19	3	(1)
2011	Croatia U20	1	(0)
- * Club domestic league appearances and goals as of 31 August 2015

Ivan Blažević (born 25 July 1992 in Zagreb) is a Croatian football midfielder, currently playing for NK Bratstvo Kunovec.

== Club career ==
In July 2020, Blažević joined Croatian amateur club NK Bratstvo Kunovec.
