= Cristian Novacek =

Romanian footballer

Personal information
- Full name: Cristian Alexandru Novacek
- Date of birth: 8 February 1996 (age 30)
- Place of birth: Bucharest, Romania
- Height: 1.89 m (6 ft 2 in)
- Positions: Defender; midfielder

Youth career
- –2014: Concordia Chiajna

Senior career*
Years	Team	Apps	(Gls)
2014–2017	Concordia II Chiajna	23	(0)
2016–2019	Concordia Chiajna	1	(0)
2018	→ Afumați (loan)	2	(0)
2018–2019	→ Alexandria (loan)	14	(0)
2019–2020	Alexandria	2	(0)
2020–2021	Foresta Suceava	12	(0)
2021	Tunari	7	(0)
2022	Făurei	0	(0)
- * Club domestic league appearances and goals as of 07:26, 21 June 2022 (UTC)

Cristian Alexandru Novacek (born 8 February 1996) is a Romanian professional footballer who plays as a defender.
