= Tiberiu Petriș =

Romanian footballer

Personal information
- Full name: Tiberiu Claudiu Petriș
- Date of birth: 20 June 1994 (age 32)
- Place of birth: Târgu Mureș, Romania
- Height: 1.75 m (5 ft 9 in)
- Position: Midfielder

Team information
- Current team: MSE Târgu Mureș
- Number: 20

Youth career
- 2004–2010: Junior Târgu Mureș
- 2010–2011: CSȘ Reghin
- 2011–2012: Junior Târgu Mureș

Senior career*
Years	Team	Apps	(Gls)
2012–2017	Târgu Mureș	31	(2)
2014–2015	→ Brașov	1	(0)
2015–2016	→ Gaz Metan Mediaș	0	(0)
2018	Academica Clinceni	8	(2)
2018–2019	Daco-Getica București	8	(0)
2019–	MSE Târgu Mureș	0	(0)
- * Club domestic league appearances and goals as of 6 March 2019

Tiberiu Claudiu Petriș (born 20 June 1994) is a Romanian professional footballer who plays as a midfielder for MSE Târgu Mureș.
