= Robert Gherghe =

Romanian footballer

Personal information
- Full name: Robert Cristian Gherghe
- Date of birth: 5 May 1996 (age 30)
- Place of birth: Slatina, Romania
- Height: 1.87 m (6 ft 2 in)
- Position: Defender

Youth career
- –2014: Olt Slatina

Senior career*
Years	Team	Apps	(Gls)
2014–2015	Olt Slatina	1	(0)
2016	Voluntari II		
2017	Metaloglobus București	3	(0)
2018–2021	Mioveni	47	(1)
2021–2022	FC Brașov	21	(1)
2022–2025	CSM Slatina	52	(0)

International career
2014–2015	Romania U19	6	(0)
- * Club domestic league appearances and goals as of 10 May 2025

Robert Cristian Gherghe (born 5 May 1996) is a Romanian professional footballer who plays as a defender.

== International career ==
Robert Gherghe played in 3 official matches for Romania U-19.
