= Loïc Gagnon =

French footballer (born 1991)

Personal information
- Full name: Loïc Guilvic Gagnon
- Date of birth: 21 January 1991 (age 35)
- Place of birth: Bondy, France
- Height: 1.73 m (5 ft 8 in)
- Position: Winger

Team information
- Current team: Romorantin

Youth career
- Monaco

Senior career*
Years	Team	Apps	(Gls)
2008–2011	Nice B		
2011–2012	Ivry	11	(1)
2012–2013	AS Cagnes		
2013–2014	Villemomble	19	(0)
2014–2016	Partizán Bardejov	54	(12)
2016–2017	Spartak Trnava	8	(0)
2017–2018	Sportul Snagov	10	(1)
2018–2019	Saint-Nazaire	21	(3)
2019–2021	Poiré-sur-Vie	2	(0)
2021–2022	Vitré	12	(1)
2022	Granville	3	(16)
2022–2023	C'Chartres	24	(6)
2022–2023	C'Chartres B	1	(0)
2023–	Romorantin	24	(7)
- * Club domestic league appearances and goals as of 7 December 2024

Loïc Guilvic Gagnon (born 21 January 1991) is a French professional footballer who plays as a winger for Championnat National 3 club Romorantin.

== Career ==
Gagnon made his Fortuna Liga debut for Spartak Trnava against Šport Podbrezová on 17 July 2016.

On 11 January 2022, Gagnon signed for French side Granville.
