= Cătălin Toriște =

Romanian footballer

Personal information
- Full name: Cătălin Constantin Toriște
- Date of birth: 20 May 1996 (age 30)
- Place of birth: Craiova, Romania
- Position: Right back

Team information
- Current team: Sporting Roșiori
- Number: 3

Youth career
- Gheorghe Hagi Academy

Senior career*
Years	Team	Apps	(Gls)
2014–2017	Viitorul Constanța	0	(0)
2014–2015	→ Viitorul II Constanța	?	(?)
2015–2016	→ Mioveni (loan)	31	(2)
2016	→ Metalurgistul Cugir (loan)	2	(0)
2017	→ Viitorul II Constanța	?	(?)
2017	Argeș Pitești	7	(0)
2018	Luceafărul Oradea	12	(0)
2019–	Sporting Roșiori	7	(0)

International career
2012–2013	Romania U-17	1	(0)
- * Club domestic league appearances and goals as of 20:49, 8 May 2019 (UTC)

Cătălin Constantin Toriște (born 20 May 1996) is a Romanian professional footballer who plays as a right back for Sporting Roșiori.
