= Harald Fridrich =

Romanian footballer

Personal information
- Full name: Harald Adrian Fridrich
- Date of birth: 20 February 1998 (age 28)
- Place of birth: Timișoara, Romania
- Height: 1.86 m (6 ft 1 in)
- Position: Defender

Team information
- Current team: Ghiroda
- Number: 16

Youth career
- 2012–2015: Poli Timișoara

Senior career*
Years	Team	Apps	(Gls)
2015–2018	Poli Timișoara	2	(0)
2017	→ Lugoj	12	(0)
2018	Lugoj	10	(0)
2018–2019	Fortuna Becicherecu Mic	6	(0)
2019–2020	ACS Carani		
2020–2022	Ripensia Timișoara	39	(2)
2023–2024	Gloria Bistrița	30	(1)
2024–	Ghiroda	0	(0)

International career^{‡}
2014–2015	Romania U-17	6	(0)
- * Club domestic league appearances and goals as of 12:49, 7 November 2024 (UTC) ‡ National team caps and goals as of 2016-29-05

Harald Adrian Fridrich (born 20 February 1998) is a Romanian professional footballer who plays as a central defender for CSC Ghiroda.

== Club career ==
Fridrich made his debut in the Liga I during the last round of the 2015-2016 season against CSMS Iasi.
