= Sorin Tabacariu =

Romanian footballer

Personal information
- Full name: Sorin Mădălin Tabacariu
- Date of birth: 23 July 1994 (age 32)
- Place of birth: Roman, Romania
- Height: 1.83 m (6 ft 0 in)
- Position: Midfielder

Youth career
- LPS Roman

Senior career*
Years	Team	Apps	(Gls)
2010–2016	Ceahlăul Piatra Neamț	45	(0)
2012–2013	→ Petrotub Roman (loan)		
2016–2017	Voluntari	16	(0)
2018	Argeș Pitești	15	(0)
2019	Aerostar Bacău	12	(0)
2019–2021	Mostiștea Ulmu	7	(4)
2021–2022	Ceahlăul Piatra Neamț	15	(2)
- * Club domestic league appearances and goals as of 06:58, 21 June 2022 (UTC)

Sorin Mădălin Tabacariu (born 23 July 1994) is a Romanian professional footballer who plays as a midfielder.
