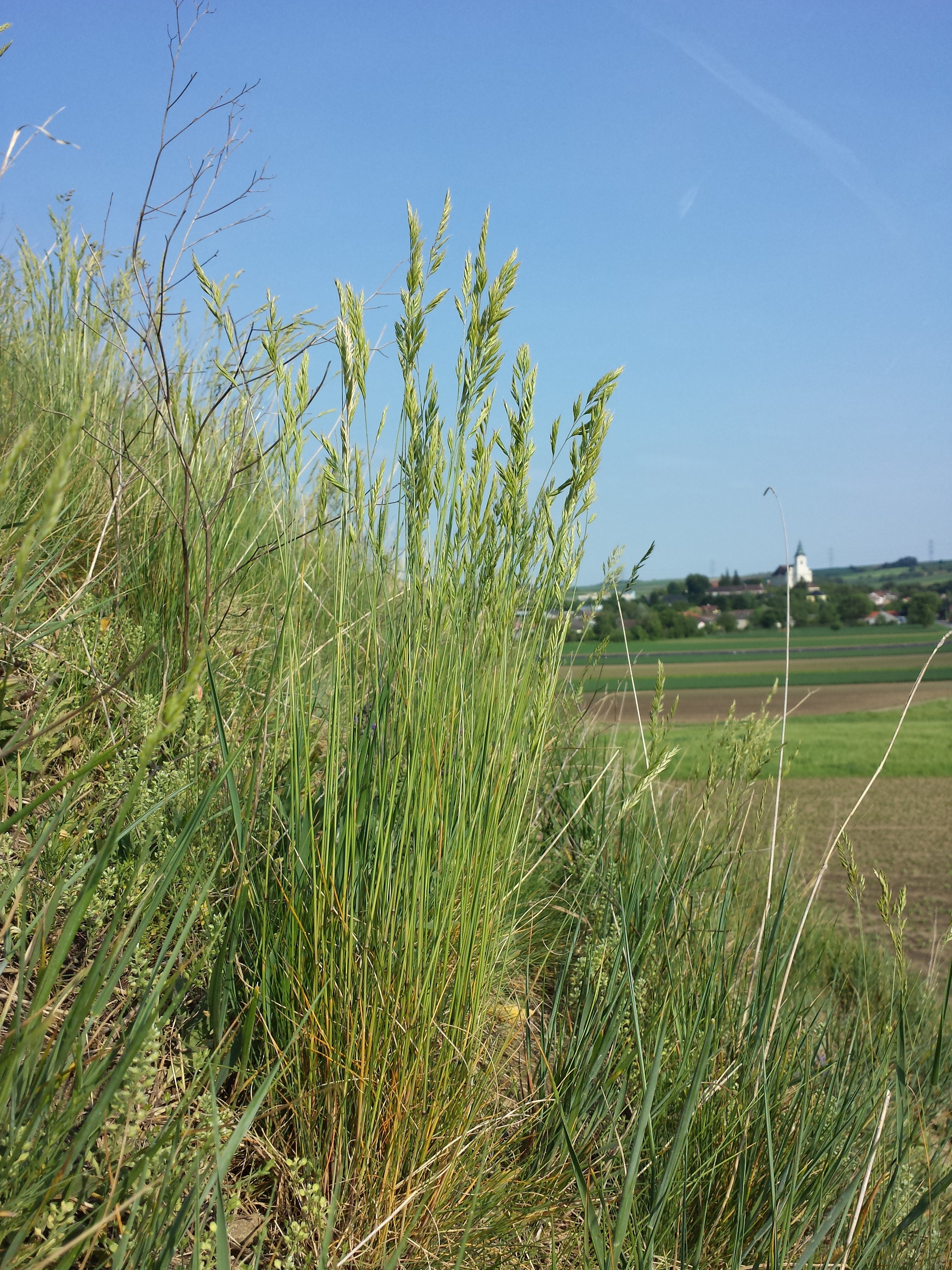

Scientific classification
- Kingdom: Plantae
- Clade: Tracheophytes
- Clade: Angiosperms
- Clade: Monocots
- Clade: Commelinids
- Order: Poales
- Family: Poaceae
- Subfamily: Pooideae
- Genus: Festuca
- Species: F. rupicola

Binomial name
- Festuca rupicola Heuff.

Synonyms
- List: Festuca anceps Kit.; Festuca colorata Schur; Festuca duernsteinensis J.Vetter; Festuca ganeschinii Drobow; Festuca glaberrima Schur; Festuca granitica J.Vetter; Festuca megaphylla Schur; Festuca ovina subvar. barbulata Hack.; Festuca ovina subsp. sulcata Hack.; Festuca ovina var. sulcatiformis Markgr.-Dann.; Festuca pallens subsp. colorata (Schur) Breistr.; Festuca recognita Reverd.; Festuca recognita f. glabra Reverd.; Festuca recognita f. subglabrata Reverd.; Festuca rupicola f. almasului (A.Nyár. & Serb.) Beldie; Festuca rupicola f. ciliata (Podp.) Soó; Festuca rupicola f. colorata (Schur) Beldie; Festuca rupicola subsp. colorata (Schur) Soó; Festuca rupicola var. coziae (A.Nyár.) Beldie; Festuca rupicola var. dacica Beldie; Festuca rupicola f. glaberrima (Schur) Beldie; Festuca rupicola f. glaucantha-hirsuta (Weighart ex Habrovcová) Soó; Festuca rupicola f. hackelii (Zapal.) Soó; Festuca rupicola f. hispida (Hack.) Beldie; Festuca rupicola f. inaequata (Kit. ex Hack.) Soó; Festuca rupicola f. incurvata (Nyár.) Soó; Festuca rupicola f. longifolia (Nyár. & Prodan) Soó; Festuca rupicola f. megaphylla (Schur) Soó; Festuca rupicola f. minor Beldie; Festuca rupicola f. pauciflora (Heuff.) Soó; Festuca rupicola f. portensis (Nyár.) Soó; Festuca rupicola f. prorepens (Rohlena) Soó; Festuca rupicola f. pseudobulbosa (Nyár. & Soó) Soó; Festuca rupicola var. retezatensis Beldie; Festuca rupicola var. rodnensis Beldie; Festuca rupicola f. strictiflora (Nyár.) Beldie; Festuca rupicola f. submutica Beldie; Festuca rupicola f. supinoides (A.Nyár.) Beldie; Festuca rupicola f. tricostata (Nyár.) Soó; Festuca stricta subsp. sulcata (Hack.) Patzke ex Joch.Müll.; Festuca × subspicata A.Nyár.; Festuca sulcata (Hack.) Beck; Festuca sulcatifrons A.Nyár.; Festuca supinoides A.Nyár.; Festuca triplicifolia J.Vetter; Festuca valesiaca var. ganeschinii (Drobow) Tzvelev; Festuca vindobonensis J.Vetter

= Festuca rupicola =

Species of grass

Festuca rupicola, the furrowed fescue, is a species of cool-season grass in the family Poaceae. It is native to the warm-temperate Old World; from the Atlas Mountains of Africa, as well as France and much of central and eastern Europe through to Central Asia and on to Manchuria, and as far south as Saudi Arabia and Iran. A tussock-former, it is considered a typical dominant species of ancient species-rich grasslands.
