= Josip Šoljić =

Croatian footballer

Personal information
- Full name: Josip Šoljić
- Date of birth: 18 June 1987 (age 39)
- Place of birth: Gradačac, Yugoslavia
- Height: 1.87 m (6 ft 2 in)
- Position: Defensive midfielder

Team information
- Current team: Hrvatski Dragovoljac
- Number: 4

Youth career
- 1998–2005: NK Zagreb

Senior career*
Years	Team	Apps	(Gls)
2005–2007	NK Zagreb	7	(0)
2006	→ Lučko (loan)	14	(4)
2008	Lučko	30	(4)
2009	Moslavina	5	(0)
2009–2010	FC Gossau	25	(0)
2010–2011	Rudeš	22	(1)
2012–2014	Zbrojovka Brno	29	(0)
2014	Milsami Orhei	10	(0)
2014–2015	Lučko	26	(0)
2015–2017	Inter Zaprešić	46	(0)
2017–2018	Poli Timișoara	33	(1)
2018–2019	Stal Mielec	61	(8)
2020	Miedź Legnica	8	(0)
2020	Wigry Suwałki	9	(1)
2021–2022	Resovia	45	(0)
2022–2023	Kotwica Kołobrzeg	39	(1)
2024–	Hrvatski Dragovoljac	23	(3)
- * Club domestic league appearances and goals as of 24 December 2024

Josip Šoljić (born 18 June 1987) is a Croatian professional footballer who plays as a defensive midfielder for Hrvatski Dragovoljac.

== Career ==
=== Club career ===
On 9 December 2019, Šoljić joined Polish I liga club Miedź Legnica on a deal until June 2022.

On 3 October 2020, he moved to Wigry Suwałki in Polish third-tier II liga.
