= 2026–27 ASC Oțelul Galați season =

Oțelul Galați
2026–27 season
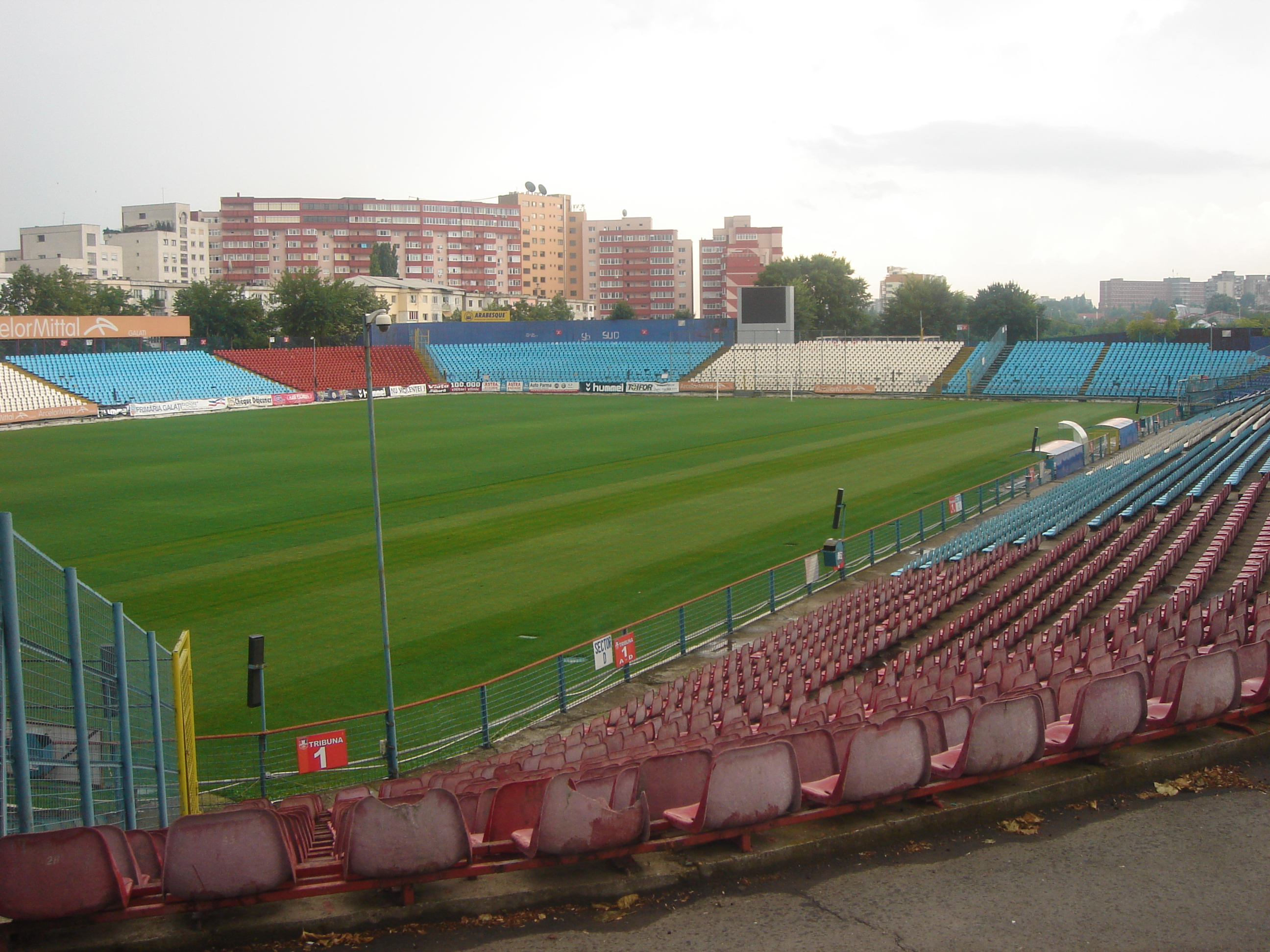
- Oțelul stadium is used as the season's home ground
- Chairman: Cristian Munteanu
- Head coach: Stjepan Tomas (until 22 September); Rui Duarte (from 28 September)
- Stadium: Oțelul
- Liga I: 14th
- Cupa României: Play-off
- Top goalscorer: League: Pedro Nuno (5); All: Pedro Nuno (5)
- Highest home attendance: 9,595 vs Dinamo București (31 July 2026)
- Lowest home attendance: 2,703 vs Csíkszereda (16 October 2026)
- Average home league attendance: 5,187
- Biggest win: Home: Oțelul Galați 2–1 CFR Cluj
- Biggest defeat: Home: Oțelul Galați 0–1 Rapid; Away: Chiajna 5–1 Oțelul Galați
| Home colours | Away colours | Third colours |
- All statistics correct as of 21 November 2026.

The 2026–27 season is Oțelul Galați's 31th season in Liga I. In addition to the Superliga, Oțelul will participate in this season's edition of Cupa României.

== Kits ==
- Supplier: Adidas
- Sponsors: MrBit, (front) / Galați County Council, Galați City Hall (shoulders) / Balkan Pharmaceuticals, (back) / Valgrig (right sleeve) / Scanexpert, R-GOL.com (left sleeve) / MMA Security Group (shorts)

| Home | Away | Third | Goalkeeper 1 | Goalkeeper 2 | Goalkeeper 3 |

== Overview ==
Oțelul finished 9th in the 2025–26 Liga I and reached the group stage of the 2025–26 Cupa României.

== Players ==
=== Transfers ===
==== In ====
| No. | Pos. | Nat. | Name | Age | EU | Moving from | Type | Transfer window | Ends | Transfer fee | Source |
|---|---|---|---|---|---|---|---|---|---|---|---|
| 7 | LW | (Cape Verde) | João Paulino | 28 | Non-EU | Ordabasy (Kazakhstan) | Transfer | Summer | 30 June 2028 | Free | |
| 30 | DM | (Romania) | Matei Frunză | 20 | EU | Cetatea Suceava | Loan ended | Summer | 30 June 2027 | Free | |
| 5 | RB | (Ivory Coast) | Habib Sylla | 27 | Non-EU | Leiria (Portugal) | Transfer | Summer | 30 June 2028 | Free | |
| 39 | CM | (Moldova) (Romania) | Teodor Lungu | 31 | EU | Unirea Slobozia | Transfer | Summer | 30 June 2028 | Free | |
| 13 | GK | (Romania) | Mario Contra | 26 | EU | Chindia Târgoviște | Transfer | Summer | 30 June 2028 | Free | |
| 3 | CB | (Greece) | Giannis Christopoulos | 25 | EU | OFI Crete (Greece) | Transfer | Summer | 30 June 2028 | Free | |
| 77 | RW | (Romania) | Alexandru Viorel Bălănică | 19 | EU | | Transfer | Summer | 30 June 2028 | Free | |
| 11 | ST | (Portugal) (Guinea-Bissau) | Zé Turbo | 29 | EU | | Transfer | Summer | 30 June 2028 | Free | |
| 28 | LB | (Portugal) | Miguel Silva | 30 | EU | Universitatea Cluj | Transfer | Summer | 30 June 2027 | Undisclosed | |
| 8 | DM | (Portugal) | Rafael Brito | 24 | EU | Casa Pia (Portugal) | Transfer | Summer | 30 June 2028 | Undisclosed | |
| 44 | RB | (Canada) | Dominick Zator | 31 | Non-EU | | Transfer | Summer | 30 June 2028 | Free | |

==== Out ====
| No. | Pos. | Nat. | Name | Age | EU | Moving to | Type | Transfer window | Transfer fee | Source |
|---|---|---|---|---|---|---|---|---|---|---|
| 32 | GK | (Romania) | Iustin Popescu | 32 | EU | CSM Reșița | Contract ended | Summer | | |
| 14 | RB | (Romania) | Andrei Rus | 24 | EU | CS Dinamo București | Contract ended | Summer | | |
| 20 | FW | (Romania) | Daniel Sandu | 18 | EU | FC Argeș | Contract ended | Summer | | |
| 23 | CM | (Romania) | Cristian Chira | 24 | EU | CSM Reșița | Contract ended | Summer | | |
| 96 | FW | (Croatia) | Gabriel Debeljuh | 29 | EU | Kauno Žalgiris (Lithuania) | Contract ended | Summer | | |
| 11 | RW | (Romania) | Ștefan Bană | 21 | EU | Universitatea Craiova | Loan ended | Summer | | |
| 97 | LB | (Italy) (Brazil) | Conrado | 29 | EU | Radomiak Radom (Poland) | Transfer | Summer | Undisclosed | |
| 80 | DM | (Angola) (Portugal) | Bruno Paz | 28 | EU | Olympiakos Nicosia (Cyprus) | Mutual | Summer | | |
| 99 | LW | (Brazil) | Luan Campos | 24 | Non-EU | Hapoel Ramat Gan (Israel) | Mutual | Summer | | |
| 31 | DM | (Croatia) | Diego Živulić | 34 | EU | NK Rudeš (Croatia) | Contract ended | Summer | | |
| 22 | GK | (Romania) | Gabriel Ursu | 24 | EU | CSM Reșița | Transfer | Summer | Undisclosed | |
| 8 | DM | (Portugal) | João Lameira | 27 | EU | Universitatea Craiova | Transfer | Summer | Undisclosed | |

EU = if holds or not a European Union passport; Country: when 2 flags, 1st flag = country that plays for internationally, 2nd flag = country of birth; N = number on jersey; P = Position (for position name, pause mouse pointer on abbreviation); Name = Name on jersey (for more extensive name, pause mouse pointer on name); Age = age on the day of the signing; Moving from = only indicate the club the player was playing before start playing for this club in this season, for the type of the moving see Status column; Moving to = only indicates the club the player is going to play next, for the type of the moving see Status column; Ends = when the player's current contract ends; n/a = Not applicable.

== Player statistics ==
=== Squad statistics ===
| | | | | Total | | | Liga I | | Cupa României | |
| No. | Pos. | Nat. | Name | Sts | App | Gls | App | Gls | App | Gls |
|---|---|---|---|---|---|---|---|---|---|---|
| 1 | GK | (Romania) | Dur-Bozoancă | 16 | 16 | | 16 | | | |
| 2 | RB | (Bulgaria) | Zhelev | 6 | 8 | | 7 | | 1 | |
| 3 | CB | (Greece) | Christopoulos | 10 | 12 | | 12 | | | |
| 4 | CB | (Portugal) | Né Lopes | 2 | 2 | | 2 | | | |
| 5 | RB | (Ivory Coast) | Sylla | 14 | 14 | | 13 | | 1 | |
| 6 | CB | (Romania) | Iacob | 16 | 17 | | 16 | | 1 | |
| 7 | LW | (Cape Verde) | João Paulino | 2 | 12 | 1 | 11 | 1 | 1 | |
| 8 | DM | (Portugal) | Lameira | 7 | 7 | 2 | 7 | 2 | | |
| 9 | ST | (Cape Verde) | Patrick | 15 | 15 | 4 | 15 | 4 | | |
| 10 | RW | (Portugal) | Andrezinho | 13 | 14 | 1 | 14 | 1 | | |
| 11 | ST | (Guinea-Bissau) | Zé Turbo | 2 | 7 | | 7 | | | |
| 13 | GK | (Romania) | Contra | 1 | 1 | | | | 1 | |
| 14 | CM | (Romania) | Robert Cojoc | | 1 | | | | 1 | |
| 15 | ST | (Romania) | Dan-Cristian Neicu | | 6 | | 6 | | | |
| 16 | CB | (Romania) | Dan-Emilian Neicu | 1 | 2 | | 1 | | 1 | |
| 17 | CM | (Romania) | Ciobanu | 15 | 16 | | 15 | | 1 | |
| 18 | CM | (Romania) | Dragoș Aftene | 1 | 3 | | 2 | | 1 | |
| 20 | LB | (Romania) | Robert Olteanu | | 1 | | | | 1 | |
| 21 | CM | (Romania) | Radu Ion | | 1 | | | | 1 | |
| 24 | CM | (Romania) | Bordun | 10 | 17 | 4 | 16 | 3 | 1 | 1 |
| 27 | AM | (Portugal) | Pedro Nuno | 16 | 16 | 5 | 16 | 5 | | |
| 28 | LB | (Romania) | Miguel Silva | 12 | 12 | 1 | 11 | 1 | 1 | |
| 30 | DM | (Romania) | Frunză | 5 | 11 | | 10 | | 1 | |
| 39 | CM | (Moldova) | Lungu | 6 | 13 | 1 | 12 | 1 | 1 | |
| 44 | RB | (Canada) | Zator | 5 | 7 | 1 | 7 | 1 | | |
| 77 | RW | (Romania) | Alexandru Viorel Bălănică | 3 | 8 | | 7 | | 1 | |
| 88 | LB | (Brazil) | Kazu | 3 | 6 | | 6 | | | |
| 8 | DM | (Portugal) | Brito | 6 | 8 | 1 | 8 | 1 | | |

Last updated: 21 November 2026
Source: official website
Ordered by player name
0 shown as blank

=== Goals ===
| Rank | Pos. | No. | Player | Liga I | Cupa României | Total |
|---|---|---|---|---|---|---|
| 1 | AM | 27 | (Portugal) Pedro Nuno | 5 | 0 | 5 |
| 2 | ST | 9 | (Cape Verde) Patrick Fernandes | 4 | 0 | 4 |
| 2 | CM | 24 | (Romania) Denis Bordun | 3 | 1 | 4 |
| 4 | DM | 8 | (Portugal) João Lameira | 2 | 0 | 2 |
| 5 | CM | 39 | (Moldova) Teodor Lungu | 1 | 0 | 1 |
| 5 | RW | 10 | (Portugal) Andrezinho | 1 | 0 | 1 |
| 5 | LW | 7 | (Cape Verde) João Paulino | 1 | 0 | 1 |
| 5 | LB | 28 | (Romania) Miguel Silva | 1 | 0 | 1 |
| 5 | RB | 44 | (Canada) Dominick Zator | 1 | 0 | 1 |
| 5 | DM | 8 | (Portugal) Rafael Brito | 1 | 0 | 1 |
| Total | | | | 20 | 1 | 21 |

Source: FBREF

=== Clean sheets ===
| Rank | No. | Player | Liga I | Cupa României | Total |
|---|---|---|---|---|---|
| 1 | 1 | (Romania) Cosmin Dur-Bozoancă | 1 | 0 | 1 |
| Total | | | 1 | 0 | 1 |

Source: FBREF

=== Disciplinary record ===
| N | P | Nat. | Name | Liga I | | | Cupa României | | | Total | | | Notes |
| N | P | Nat. | Name | Yellow card | Second yellow card | Red card | Yellow card | Second yellow card | Red card | Yellow card | Second yellow card | Red card | Notes |
| 8 | DM | (Portugal) | João Lameira | 2 | | | | | | 2 | | | |
| 9 | ST | (Cape Verde) | Patrick Fernandes | 3 | 1 | | | | | 3 | 1 | | |
| 27 | AM | (Portugal) | Pedro Nuno | 3 | | | | | | 3 | | | |
| 1 | GK | (Romania) | Cosmin Dur-Bozoancă | 1 | | | | | | 1 | | | |
| 2 | RB | (Bulgaria) | Milen Zhelev | 1 | | | | | | 1 | | | |
| 6 | CB | (Romania) | Paul Iacob | 2 | | | 1 | | | 3 | | | |
| 17 | CM | (Romania) | Andrei Ciobanu | 3 | 1 | | | | | 3 | 1 | | |
| 39 | CM | (Moldova) | Teodor Lungu | 4 | | | | | | 4 | | | |
| 24 | CM | (Romania) | Denis Bordun | 1 | | | | | | 1 | | | |
| 15 | ST | (Romania) | Dan-Cristian Neicu | | | 1 | | | | | | 1 | |
| 30 | DM | (Romania) | Matei Frunză | 1 | | | 1 | | | 2 | | | |
| 10 | RW | (Portugal) | Andrezinho | 2 | | | | | | 2 | | | |
| 77 | RW | (Romania) | Alexandru Viorel Bălănică | 2 | | | | | | 2 | | | |
| 5 | RB | (Ivory Coast) | Habib Sylla | 3 | | 1 | | | | 3 | | 1 | |
| 3 | CB | (Greece) | Giannis Christopoulos | 2 | | | | | | 2 | | | |
| 7 | LW | (Cape Verde) | João Paulino | 1 | | | | | | 1 | | | |
| 28 | LB | (Romania) | Miguel Silva | 4 | 1 | | | | | 4 | 1 | | |
| 8 | DM | (Portugal) | Rafael Brito | 1 | | | | | | 1 | | | |
| Total | | | | 36 | 3 | 2 | 2 | | | 38 | 3 | 2 | |

Last updated: 21 November 2026
Source: FBREF
Only competitive matches
(yellow card) = Number of bookings; (second yellow card) = Number of sending offs after a second yellow card; (red card) = Number of sending offs by a direct red card.

=== Start formations ===
| Qnt | Formation | Match(es) |
|---|---|---|
| 11 | 4-3-3 | |
| 5 | 4-2-3-1 | |
| 1 | 4-1-4-1 | |

Last updated: 21 November 2026
Source: Match reports in Matches
Only competitive matches.

== Club ==
=== Current technical staff ===
| Role | Name |
|---|---|
| Head coach | (Portugal) Rui Duarte |
| Assistant coach | (Portugal) Neca |
| Goalkeeping coach | (Romania) Iulian Olteanu |
| Fitness coach | (Portugal) Frederico Hélder de Sousa e Carmo |
| Video analyst | (Portugal) Mauro Bastos |
| Club doctor | (Romania) Ionuț Băneșanu |
| Physiotherapist | (Romania) Marius Matei |
| Masseurs | (Romania) Constantin Crăciun (Romania) Petrișor Bălan |
| Storemen | (Romania) Iulian Dogaru (Romania) Cristian Bahnașu |
| Nutritionist | (Romania) Alexandru Buză |

- Last updated: 3 October 2026

== Competitions ==
=== Overall ===
| | Total | Home | Away |
|---|---|---|---|
| Games played | 17 | 8 | 9 |
| Games won | 2 | 2 | - |
| Games drawn | 7 | 4 | 3 |
| Games lost | 8 | 2 | 6 |
| Biggest win | 2–1 vs. CFR Cluj | 2–1 vs. CFR Cluj | - |
| Biggest loss | 1–5 vs. Chiajna | 0–1 vs. Rapid | 1–5 vs. Chiajna |
| Clean sheets | 1 | 1 | - |
| Goals scored | 20 | 9 | 11 |
| Goals conceded | 31 | 9 | 22 |
| Goal difference | -11 | 0 | -11 |
| Average GF per game | 1.18 | 1.13 | 1.22 |
| Average GA per game | 1.82 | 1.13 | 2.44 |
| Yellow cards | 38 | 15 | 23 |
| Red cards | 5 | 1 | 4 |
| Most appearances | Iacob, Bordun (17) | | |
| Most minutes played | (Romania) Iacob (1589) | | |
| Top scorer | (Portugal) Pedro Nuno (5) | | |
| Top assister | (Portugal) Pedro Nuno (8) | | |
| Points | 13/51 (25.49%) | 10/24 (41.67%) | 3/27 (11.11%) |
| Winning rate | 11.76% | 25% | 0% |

Last updated: 21 November 2026
Source: Matches

=== SuperLiga ===
==== League table ====
| Pos | Team | Pld | W | D | L | GF | GA | GD | Pts | Qualification |
|---|---|---|---|---|---|---|---|---|---|---|
| 12 | Botoșani | 16 | 3 | 7 | 6 | 22 | 23 | −1 | 16 | Advances to Play-out |
| 13 | Argeș Pitești | 15 | 4 | 3 | 8 | 10 | 17 | −7 | 15 | Advances to Play-out |
| 14 | Oțelul Galați | 15 | 2 | 7 | 6 | 17 | 23 | −6 | 13 | Advances to Play-out |
| 15 | Voluntari | 16 | 2 | 3 | 11 | 18 | 36 | −18 | 9 | Advances to Play-out |
| 16 | Csíkszereda Miercurea Ciuc | 15 | 1 | 3 | 11 | 8 | 28 | −20 | 6 | Advances to Play-out |

Updated to match(es) played on 20 November 2026. Source: LPF (in Romanian)
Rules for classification: 1) Points; 2) Head-to-head points; 3) Head-to-head goal difference; 4) Head-to-head goals scored; 5) Goal difference; 6) Goals scored; 7) Play-off.

==== Results summary ====
| Overall | | | | | | | | Home | | | | | | Away | | | | | |
| Pld | W | D | L | GF | GA | GD | Pts | W | D | L | GF | GA | GD | W | D | L | GF | GA | GD |
|---|---|---|---|---|---|---|---|---|---|---|---|---|---|---|---|---|---|---|---|
| 16 | 2 | 7 | 7 | 19 | 26 | −7 | 13 | 2 | 4 | 2 | 9 | 9 | 0 | 0 | 3 | 5 | 10 | 17 | −7 |

Last updated: 21 November 2026.
Source: Matches

==== Results by round ====
| Round | 1 | 2 | 3 | 4 | 5 | 6 | 7 | 8 | 9 | 10 | 11 | 12 | 13 | 14 | 15 | 16 | 17 | 18 | 19 | 20 | 21 | 22 | 23 | 24 | 25 | 26 | 27 | 28 | 29 | 30 |
|---|---|---|---|---|---|---|---|---|---|---|---|---|---|---|---|---|---|---|---|---|---|---|---|---|---|---|---|---|---|---|
| Ground | H | A | H | A | H | H | A | H | A | H | A | H | A | H | A | A | H | A | H | A | A | H | A | H | A | H | A | H | A | H |
| Result | W | D | D | L | D | W | D | L | L | L | L | D | L | D | D | L | | | | | | | | | | | | | | |
| Position | 5 | 2 | 6 | 10 | 10 | 9 | 8 | 10 | 13 | 14 | 14 | 13 | 14 | 14 | 14 | 14 | | | | | | | | | | | | | | |

Updated to match(es) played on 21 November 2026. Source:
A = Away; H = Home; W = Win; D = Draw; L = Loss

==== Points by opponent ====
| Team | Results | | | | Points |
| Team | Regular | | Play-out | | Points |
| Team | Home | Away | Home | Away | Points |
|---|---|---|---|---|---|
| Argeș | 1–0 | | | | 3 |
| CFR Cluj | 2–1 | 2–3 | | | 3 |
| Corvinul | 2–3 | | | | 0 |
| Csíkszereda | 1–1 | | | | 1 |
| Dinamo | 1–1 | | | | 1 |
| Farul | | 3–4 | | | 0 |
| FC Botoșani | | 1–1 | | | 1 |
| FCSB | | 0–1 | | | 0 |
| Petrolul | | 0–1 | | | 0 |
| Rapid | 0–1 | | | | 0 |
| Sepsi | 1–1 | | | | 1 |
| U Cluj | | 0–3 | | | 0 |
| U Craiova | 1–1 | | | | 1 |
| UTA | | 2–2 | | | 1 |
| Voluntari | | 2–2 | | | 1 |

Source: SCOG

==== Matches ====
| 18 July 2026 Matchday 1 | Oțelul Galați | 2–1 | CFR Cluj | Galați |
| 18:30 EEST (UTC+03) | Lameira 4'; Patrick 86' | (Report) | Cordea 58'; Đoković (yellow card) 76' | Stadium: Oțelul; Attendance: 4,743; Referee: Florin Andrei |

| 24 July 2026 Matchday 2 | UTA Arad | 2–2 | Oțelul Galați | Arad |
| 18:30 EEST (UTC+03) | Sinani 73'; Papeau 90+4'; Roman (yellow card) 90+6'; Alomerovikj (yellow card) 90+6' (red card) 90+6' | (Report) | Andrezinho 21', (yellow card) 18'; Patrick 45+3'; Alexandru Viorel Bălănică (yellow card) 68' | Stadium: Francisc von Neuman; Attendance: 4,687; Referee: Sorin Vădana |

| 31 July 2026 Matchday 3 | Oțelul Galați | 1–1 | Dinamo București | Galați |
| 21:30 EEST (UTC+03) | Patrick 66' | (Report) | Soro 42', (yellow card) 80'; Musi (yellow card) 27'; D. Irimia (yellow card) 73' | Stadium: Oțelul; Attendance: 9,595; Referee: George Găman |

| 9 August 2026 Matchday 4 | Petrolul Ploiești | 1–0 | Oțelul Galați | Ploiești |
| 18:30 EEST (UTC+03) | Nlundulu 34' (pen.); Țuțu (yellow card) 14'; Dele Israel (yellow card) 67'; Dumitrescu (yellow card) 90+4' | (Report) | Sylla (yellow card) 45+1'; João Paulino (yellow card) 90+6'; Dan-Cristian Neicu (red card) 77' | Stadium: Ilie Oană; Attendance: 5,115; Referee: Andrei Chivulete |

| 16 August 2026 Matchday 5 | Oțelul Galați | 1–1 | Universitatea Craiova | Galați |
| 18:30 EEST (UTC+03) | Lungu 87', (yellow card) 90+3'; Lameira (yellow card) 60' | (Report) | Etim 56'; Baiaram (yellow card) 80'; Romanchuk (yellow card) 85'; Sava (yellow card) 95'; David Matei (yellow card) 90+3'; Crețu (yellow card) 23' (yellow-red card) 29' | Stadium: Oțelul; Attendance: 7,004; Referee: Marcel Bîrsan |

| 24 August 2026 Matchday 6 | Oțelul Galați | 1–0 | Argeș Pitești | Galați |
| 21:30 EEST (UTC+03) | Lameira 51', (yellow card) 90+3'; Lungu (yellow card) 88' | (Report) | Tofan (yellow card) 36'; Oancea (yellow card) 90+2' | Stadium: Oțelul; Attendance: 4,613; Referee: Viorel Flueran |

| 28 August 2026 Matchday 7 | Voluntari | 2–2 | Oțelul Galați | Voluntari |
| 18:00 EEST (UTC+03) | Guțea 3', 14'; Haruț (yellow card) 70' | (Report) | Patrick 6'; Pedro Nuno 72' (pen.) | Stadium: Anghel Iordănescu; Attendance: 512; Referee: Horațiu Feșnic |

| 6 September 2026 Matchday 8 | Oțelul Galați | 0–1 | Rapid București | Galați |
| 20:30 EEST (UTC+03) | Pedro Nuno (yellow card) 80'; Patrick (yellow card) 18' (yellow-red card) 78' | (Report) | Pașcanu 90+4' | Stadium: Oțelul; Attendance: 6,136; Referee: Marian Barbu |

| 14 September 2026 Matchday 9 | Universitatea Cluj | 3–0 | Oțelul Galați | Cluj-Napoca |
| 18:00 EEST (UTC+03) | Bic 31'; Mendy 80'; Aliyev 90+2' (pen.); Codrea (yellow card) 58'; Pedro Pinho (yellow card) 65' | (Report) | Zhelev (yellow card) 48'; Lungu (yellow card) 77'; Ciobanu (yellow card) 64' (yellow-red card) 74' | Stadium: Cluj Arena; Attendance: 4,029; Referee: Szabolcs Kovács |

| 21 September 2026 Matchday 10 | Oțelul Galați | 2–3 | Corvinul Hunedoara | Galați |
| 18:00 EEST (UTC+03) | Miguel Silva 51', (yellow card) 82'; Bordun 64'; Lungu (yellow card) 30'; Andrezinho (yellow card) 61'; Iacob (yellow card) 81'; Patrick (yellow card) 90' | (Report) | Nicolae Pîrvulescu 20', (yellow card) 60'; Goodlad 62'; Gillard 73'; Antoniu Manolache (yellow card) 22'; Iacob (yellow card) 45+1'; Yeboah (yellow card) 49'; Ribeiro (yellow card) 53'; Hrezdac (yellow card) 90+1' | Stadium: Oțelul; Attendance: 3,793; Referee: Rareș Vidican |

| 10 October 2026 Matchday 11 | FCSB | 1–0 | Oțelul Galați | Bucharest |
| 21:30 EEST (UTC+03) | Stoian 65'; Arad (yellow card) 14'; Crețu (yellow card) 45' | (Report) | Bordun (yellow card) 47'; Christopoulos (yellow card) 60'; Sylla (yellow card) 3' (red card) 51' | Stadium: Arena Națională; Attendance: 10,211; Referee: George Roman |

| 16 October 2026 Matchday 12 | Oțelul Galați | 1–1 | Csíkszereda | Galați |
| 18:00 EEST (UTC+03) | Brito 23'; Christopoulos (yellow card) 89' | (Report) | Kukovec 52', (yellow card) 58' (yellow-red card) 77'; Palmeș (yellow card) 45+1'; Pap (yellow card) 89'; Vuković (yellow card) 69' (yellow-red card) 73' | Stadium: Oțelul; Attendance: 2,703; Referee: István Kovács |

| 25 October 2026 Matchday 13 | Farul Constanța | 4–3 | Oțelul Galați | Ovidiu |
| 16:00 EET (UTC+02) | Ahlinvi 8', 28'; Mărincean 40'; Goncear 71'; Dican (yellow card) 30'; Ganea (yellow card) 63' | (Report) | Zator 55'; Bordun 74', 78'; Alexandru Viorel Bălănică (yellow card) 13' | Stadium: Viitorul; Attendance: 2,412; Referee: Viorel Flueran |

| 1 November 2026 Matchday 14 | Oțelul Galați | 1–1 | Sepsi OSK | Galați |
| 15:00 EET (UTC+02) | Pedro Nuno 90+5' (pen.), (yellow card) 36'; Miguel Silva (yellow card) 14' | (Report) | Oberlin 68'; Păun (yellow card) 61' | Stadium: Oțelul; Attendance: 2,912; Referee: Florin Andrei |

| 9 November 2026 Matchday 15 | FC Botoșani | 1–1 | Oțelul Galați | Botoșani |
| 20:00 EET (UTC+02) | Idowu 90+4'; Papa (yellow card) 30'; Bordeianu (yellow card) 90+5' | (Report) | Pedro Nuno 69'; Iacob (yellow card) 37'; Frunză (yellow card) 69'; Dur-Bozoancă (yellow card) 89' | Stadium: Municipal; Attendance: 1,113; Referee: George Găman |

| 21 November 2026 Matchday 16 | CFR Cluj | 3–2 | Oțelul Galați | Cluj-Napoca |
| 17:30 EET (UTC+02) | Dražić 25'; Cordea 44' (pen.), 47', (yellow card) 84'; Omić (yellow card) 51'; Ziblim (yellow card) 61'; Pantalon (yellow card) 51' (yellow-red card) 62' | (Report) | Pedro Nuno 32', (yellow card) 42'; João Paulino 85'; Ciobanu (yellow card) 45'; Brito (yellow card) 67'; Sylla (yellow card) 72'; Miguel Silva (yellow card) 24' (yellow-red card) 45' | Stadium: Dr. Constantin Rădulescu; Attendance: 2,006; Referee: István Kovács |

| 29 November 2026 Matchday 17 | Oțelul Galați | v | UTA Arad | Galați |
| 15:00 EET (UTC+02) | | | | Stadium: Oțelul |

| 7 December 2026 Matchday 18 | Dinamo București | v | Oțelul Galați | București |
| 20:00 EET (UTC+02) | | | | Stadium: Arcul de Triumf |

| 12 December 2026 Matchday 19 | Oțelul Galați | v | Petrolul Ploiești | Galați |
| | | | | Stadium: Oțelul |

| 19 December 2026 Matchday 20 | Universitatea Craiova | v | Oțelul Galați | Craiova |
| | | | | Stadium: Ion Oblemenco |

| 16 January 2027 Matchday 21 | Argeș Pitești | v | Oțelul Galați | Mioveni |
| | | | | Stadium: Orășenesc |

| 23 January 2027 Matchday 22 | Oțelul Galați | v | Voluntari | Galați |
| | | | | Stadium: Oțelul |

| 30 January 2027 Matchday 23 | Rapid București | v | Oțelul Galați | Bucharest |
| | | | | Stadium: Rapid-Giulești |

| 6 February 2027 Matchday 24 | Oțelul Galați | v | Universitatea Cluj | Galați |
| | | | | Stadium: Oțelul |

| 10 February 2027 Matchday 25 | Corvinul Hunedoara | v | Oțelul Galați | Arad |
| | | | | Stadium: Francisc von Neuman |

| 13 February 2027 Matchday 26 | Oțelul Galați | v | FCSB | Galați |
| | | | | Stadium: Oțelul |

| 20 February 2027 Matchday 27 | Csíkszereda | v | Oțelul Galați | Sfântu Gheorghe |
| | | | | Stadium: Sepsi Arena |

| 27 February 2027 Matchday 28 | Oțelul Galați | v | Farul Constanța | Galați |
| | | | | Stadium: Oțelul |

| 6 March 2027 Matchday 29 | Sepsi OSK | v | Oțelul Galați | Sfântu Gheorghe |
| | | | | Stadium: Sepsi Arena |

| 13 March 2027 Matchday 30 | Oțelul Galați | v | FC Botoșani | Galați |
| | | | | Stadium: Oțelul |

=== Cupa României ===
Oțelul will participate in this season's Cupa României starting with the play-off round, after finishing outside top 8 in the previous season of Liga I.

| 19 August 2026 Play-off | Concordia Chiajna | 5–1 | Oțelul Galați | Chiajna |
| 20:30 EEST (UTC+03) | Sula 34'; Alejandro Gualda 44'; Alexis Chamorro 63'; Ganea 80'; Ion 83'; Gualda Jardon (yellow card) 42'; Bălașa (yellow card) 77' | (Report) | Bordun 90'; Frunză (yellow card) 48'; Iacob (yellow card) 52' | Stadium: Concordia; Attendance: 800; Referee: Negară Ioan-Răzvan |

=== Friendlies ===
| 3 July 2026 | Farul Constanța | 0–0 | Oțelul Galați | Ovidiu |
| 17:30 EEST (UTC+03) | | (Report) | | Stadium: Baza Sportivă a Academiei Hagi |

| 11 July 2026 | Oțelul Galați | 3–1 | FC Bacău | Galați |
| 11:00 EEST (UTC+03) | João Paulino 23'; Patrick 59'; Frunză 90+5' | (Report) | Pavel 38' | Stadium: Oțelul |

| 3 October 2026 | Oțelul Galați | 1–1 | FC Bacău | Galați |
| 11:00 EEST (UTC+03) | Brito 58'; Dur-Bozoancă (red card) 46' | (Report) | Gabriel Cîrstean 48' (pen.) | Stadium: Oțelul |

== See also ==
- ASC Oțelul Galați
- 2026–27 Liga I
- 2026–27 Cupa României
