= 2025–26 ASC Oțelul Galați season =

Oțelul Galați
2025–26 season
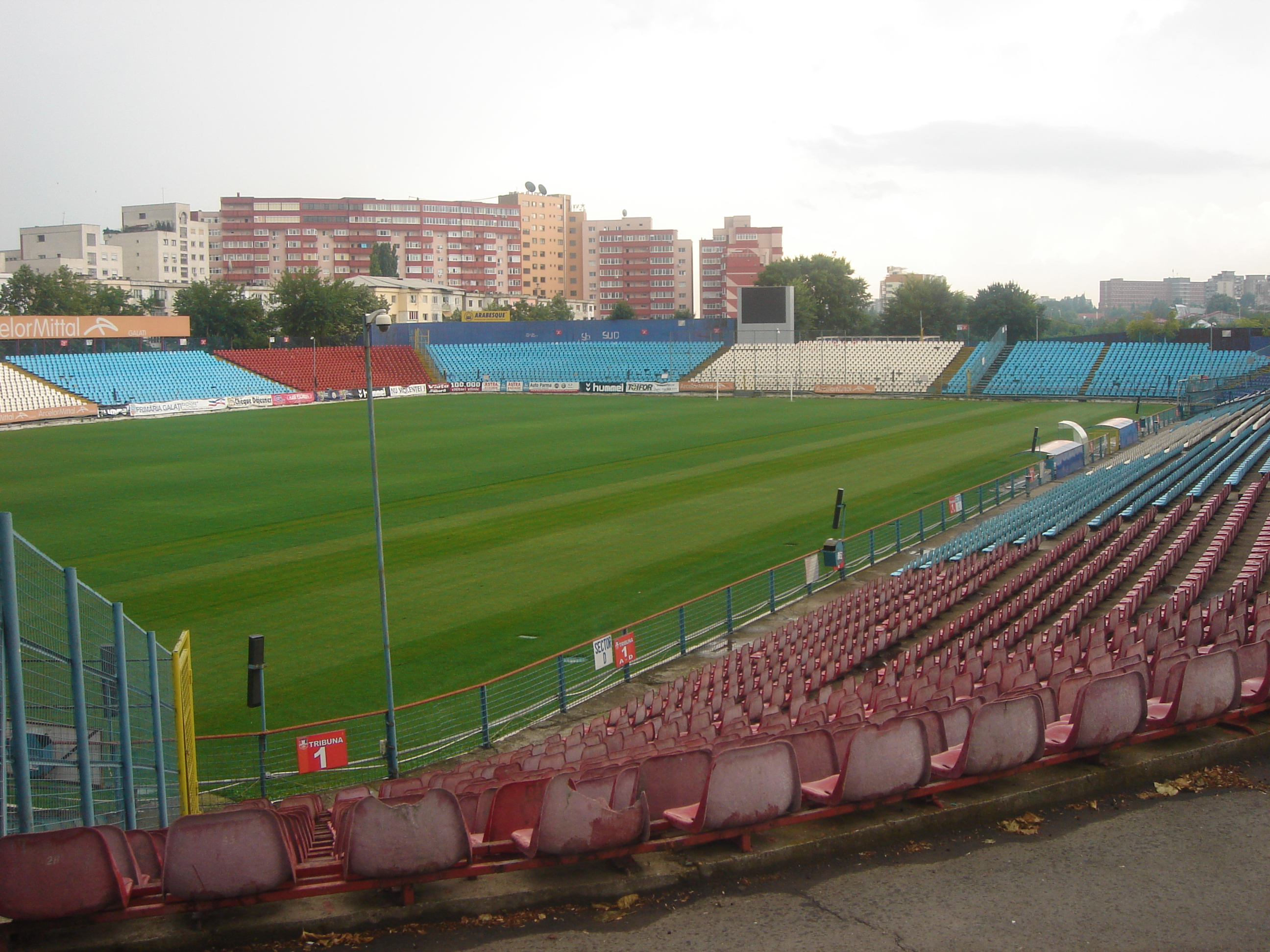
- Oțelul stadium is used as the season's home ground
- Chairman: Cristian Munteanu
- Head coach: László Balint (until 14 March); Stjepan Tomas (from 17 March)
- Stadium: Oțelul
- Liga I: 9th
- Cupa României: Group Stage
- Top goalscorer: League: Patrick; Paulinho; Pedro Nuno; Conrado (7); All: Pedro Nuno (8)
- Highest home attendance: 10,097 vs Rapid București (11 August 2025)
- Lowest home attendance: 2,025 vs Metaloglobus (6 October 2025)
- Average home league attendance: 4,972
- Biggest win: Home: Oțelul Galați 4–0 Metaloglobus; Away: UTA 0–4 Oțelul Galați
- Biggest defeat: Home: Oțelul Galați 1–4 FCSB; Away: U Cluj 4–0 Oțelul Galați
Home colours	Away colours	Third colours
- All statistics correct as of 18 May 2026.

The 2025–26 season is Oțelul Galați's 30th season in Liga I. In addition to the Superliga, Oțelul will participate in this season's edition of Cupa României.

== Kits ==
- Supplier: Adidas
- Sponsors: MrBit, Galați County Council (front) / Galați City Hall (shoulders) / Visit Galați, Balkan Pharmaceuticals, Liberty, (back) / Valgrig (right sleeve) / R-GOL.com (left sleeve) / CreditFix (shorts)

Home	Away	Third	Goalkeeper 1	Goalkeeper 2	Goalkeeper 3

== Overview ==
Oțelul finished 8th in the 2024–25 Liga I and reached the group stage of the 2024–25 Cupa României.

Under László Balint, the team competed for a championship play off place but a poor run of results ended their chances after a 4–0 defeat to Universitatea Cluj on 27 February 2026. Oțelul finished the regular season 10th with 41 points and entered the play out.

Balint resigned on 14 March 2026 following a 2–3 defeat to Csíkszereda in the opening play out match. On 17 March, Stjepan Tomas was appointed head coach until the end of the season with an option to extend.

The club did not apply for a UEFA licence for the 2026–27 UEFA competitions due to unpaid wages.

In the 2025–26 Cupa României, Oțelul finished third in Group C and was eliminated in the group stage, with Universitatea Cluj and Metalul Buzău advancing.

== Players ==
=== Transfers ===
==== In ====
No.	Pos.	Nat.	Name	Age	EU	Moving from	Type	Transfer window	Ends	Transfer fee	Source
17	CM	(Romania)	Andrei Ciobanu	27	EU	Farul Constanța	Transfer	Summer	30 June 2027	Free	
29	LB	(Romania)	Răzvan Trif	27	EU	UTA Arad	Transfer	Summer	30 June 2026	Free	
20	CF	(Romania)	Daniel Sandu	17	EU	Metaloglobus București	Transfer	Summer	30 June 2029	Free	
9	ST	(Portugal) (Cape Verde)	Patrick Fernandes	31	EU	Marítimo (Portugal)	Transfer	Summer	30 June 2027	Free	
8	DM	(Portugal)	João Lameira	26	EU	Baltika Kaliningrad (Russia)	Transfer	Summer	30 June 2027	Undisclosed	
11	RW	(Romania)	Ștefan Bană	20	EU	Universitatea Craiova	Loaned-in	Summer	30 June 2026	Undisclosed	
88	LB	(Brazil)	Kazu	25	Non-EU	Gil Vicente (Portugal)	Transfer	Summer	30 June 2027	Undisclosed	
7	RW	(Portugal)	Andrezinho	28	EU	Santa Clara (Portugal)	Transfer	Summer	30 June 2027	Undisclosed	
18	CM	(Cape Verde)	João Paulo Fernandes	27	Non-EU	Sheriff Tiraspol (Moldova)	Transfer	Summer	30 June 2027	Undisclosed	
4	CB	(Portugal)	Né Lopes	25	EU	Torreense (Portugal)	Transfer	Summer	30 June 2027	Undisclosed	
15	ST	(Romania)	Dan-Cristian Neicu	20	EU	Oberneuland (Germany)	Transfer	Summer	30 June 2027	Undisclosed	
16	CB	(Romania)	Dan-Emilian Neicu	22	EU	Nöttingen (Germany)	Transfer	Summer	30 June 2027	Undisclosed	
30	DM	(Romania)	Matei Frunză	19	EU	Rapid București	Transfer	Summer	30 June 2027	Undisclosed	
77	ST	(Portugal)	Paulinho	25	EU	Viborg (Denmark)	Transfer	Summer	30 June 2027	Undisclosed	
5	CB	(Spain) (Russia)	Vadik Murria	23	EU	Tarazona (Spain)	Transfer	Summer	30 June 2027	Undisclosed	
6	CB	(Romania)	Paul Iacob	29	EU	Rapid București	Transfer	Summer	30 June 2026	Undisclosed	
27	AM	(Portugal)	Pedro Nuno	30	EU	Korona Kielce (Poland)	Transfer	Summer	30 June 2027	Undisclosed	
97	LB	(Italy) (Brazil)	Conrado	28	EU	Atlético Goianiense (Brazil)	Transfer	Summer	30 June 2026	Undisclosed	
80	DM	(Angola) (Portugal)	Bruno Paz	27	EU	Zimbru Chișinău (Moldova)	Transfer	Winter	30 June 2028	Undisclosed	
99	RW	(Brazil)	Luan Campos	23	Non-EU		Transfer	Winter	30 June 2028	Undisclosed	
96	ST	(Croatia)	Gabriel Debeljuh	29	EU		Transfer	Winter	30 June 2026	Undisclosed	

==== Out ====
No.	Pos.	Nat.	Name	Age	EU	Moving to	Type	Transfer window	Transfer fee	Source
22	RW	(Romania)	Andrei Bani	22	EU	Al-Hussein (Jordan)	Mutual	Summer		
59	FW	(Serbia) (Romania)	Jovan Marković	24	EU	Universitatea Craiova	Loan ended	Summer		
21	CM	(Portugal)	Samuel Teles	28	EU	Universitatea Craiova	Contract ended	Summer		
8	DM	(Romania)	Ionuț Neagu	35	EU		Retired	Summer		
27	RB	(Romania)	David Maftei	20	EU	Farul Constanța	Loan ended	Summer		
17	AM	(Romania)	Răzvan Tănasă	22	EU	Farul Constanța	Loan ended	Summer		
66	DM	(Portugal)	João Lameira	26	EU	Baltika Kaliningrad (Russia)	Loan ended	Summer		
4	CB	(Switzerland)	Martin Angha	31	Non-EU	Uthai Thani (Thailand)	Contract ended	Summer		
29	AM	(Belgium)	Samy Bourard	29	EU	Flamurtari (Albania)	Contract ended	Summer		
28	LB	(Portugal)	Miguel Silva	29	EU	Universitatea Cluj	Contract ended	Summer		
91	CF	(Colombia)	Stiven Plaza	26	Non-EU	Chindia Târgoviște	Contract ended	Summer		
16	LM	(Romania)	Alexandru Mitulețu	21	EU	FC U Craiova	Contract ended	Summer		
9	ST	(Romania)	Alex Stan	19	EU	Rapid București	Loan ended	Summer		
20	CM	(Romania)	Neluț Roșu	31	EU	CS Tunari	Mutual	Summer		
67	RW	(Portugal)	Frédéric Maciel	31	EU	CSKA 1948 (Bulgaria)	Contract ended	Summer		
97	ST	(Romania)	Albert Hofman	22	EU	Universitatea Cluj	Loan ended	Summer		
11	LM	(Romania)	Alexandru Burcea	20	EU	Concordia Chiajna	Loan ended	Summer		
6	CB	(Ivory Coast)	Jonathan Cissé	28	Non-EU	Universitatea Cluj	Contract ended	Summer		
19	WI	(Moldova)	Maxim Cojocaru	27	Non-EU	Petrocub (Moldova)	Contract ended	Summer		
34	CM	(Slovenia)	Jakob Novak	27	EU		Contract ended	Summer		
5	CB	(Serbia)	Nikola Stevanović	26	Non-EU	Universitatea Craiova	Transfer	Summer	Undisclosed	
12	GK	(Romania)	Darius Paharnicu	20	EU	CS Dinamo	Transfer	Summer	Undisclosed	
10	AM	(Romania)	Eric Bicfalvi	37	EU		Mutual	Summer		
29	LB	(Romania)	Răzvan Trif	27	EU		Mutual	Summer		
3	CB	(Colombia)	Julián Bonilla	28	Non-EU		Mutual	Winter		
5	CB	(Spain) (Russia)	Vadik Murria	24	EU	Unionistas de Salamanca (Spain)	Mutual	Winter		
77	ST	(Portugal)	Paulinho	26	EU	Wieczysta Kraków (Poland)	Transfer	Winter	Undisclosed	
18	CM	(Cape Verde)	João Paulo Fernandes	27	Non-EU	FCSB	Transfer	Winter	Undisclosed	
30	MF	(Romania)	Matei Frunză	19	EU	Cetatea Suceava	Loaned out	Winter	Undisclosed	

EU = if holds or not a European Union passport; Country: when 2 flags, 1st flag = country that plays for internationally, 2nd flag = country of birth; N = number on jersey; P = Position (for position name, pause mouse pointer on abbreviation); Name = Name on jersey (for more extensive name, pause mouse pointer on name); Age = age on the day of the signing; Moving from = only indicate the club the player was playing before start playing for this club in this season, for the type of the moving see Status column; Moving to = only indicates the club the player is going to play next, for the type of the moving see Status column; Ends = when the player's current contract ends; n/a = Not applicable.

== Player statistics ==
=== Squad statistics ===
				Total			Liga I		Cupa României	
No.	Pos.	Nat.	Name	Sts	App	Gls	App	Gls	App	Gls
1	GK	(Romania)	Dur-Bozoancă	36	36		35		1	
2	RB	(Bulgaria)	Zhelev	37	39	1	37	1	2	
3	CB	(Colombia)	Julián Bonilla	2	2		2			
4	CB	(Portugal)	Né Lopes	18	22	1	21	1	1	
5	CB	(Russia)	Murria	6	12		11		1	
6	CB	(Romania)	Iacob	29	31	2	28	2	3	
7	RW	(Portugal)	Andrezinho	37	42	5	39	4	3	1
8	DM	(Portugal)	Lameira	36	37	4	35	4	2	
9	ST	(Cape Verde)	Patrick	30	42	7	39	7	3	
10	AM	(Romania)	Bicfalvi	2	4		4			
11	RW	(Romania)	Bană	22	23	4	22	4	1	
14	RB	(Romania)	Rus	3	10		9		1	
15	ST	(Romania)	Dan-Cristian Neicu	1	9	1	8	1	1	
16	CB	(Romania)	Dan-Emilian Neicu	3	6		5		1	
17	CM	(Romania)	Ciobanu	23	37	5	34	4	3	1
18	CM	(Cape Verde)	João Paulo	18	21	1	19	1	2	
20	FW	(Romania)	Sandu	8	17		16		1	
23	CM	(Romania)	Chira	3	15	1	12		3	1
24	CM	(Romania)	Bordun	11	25	4	23	3	2	1
27	AM	(Portugal)	Pedro Nuno	20	25	8	24	7	1	1
29	LB	(Romania)	Trif	2	4		4			
30	DM	(Romania)	Frunză		8		7		1	
31	DM	(Croatia)	Živulić	36	36		34		2	
32	GK	(Romania)	Popescu	6	7		5		2	
5	MF	(Romania)	Dragoș Aftene		1		1			
77	ST	(Portugal)	Paulinho	12	22	7	20	7	2	
80	DM	(Angola)	Paz	4	17		16		1	
88	LB	(Brazil)	Kazu	13	22	1	21	1	1	
96	ST	(Croatia)	Debeljuh	6	16		15		1	
97	LB	(Brazil)	Conrado	29	32	7	29	7	3	
99	LW	(Brazil)	Luan	9	10	1	10	1		

Last updated: 18 May 2026
Source: official website
Ordered by player name
0 shown as blank

=== Goals ===
Rank	Pos.	No.	Player	Liga I	Cupa României	Total
1	AM	27	(Portugal) Pedro Nuno	7	1	8
2	ST	9	(Cape Verde) Patrick Fernandes	7	0	7
2	ST	77	(Portugal) Paulinho	7	0	7
2	LB	97	(Brazil) Conrado	7	0	7
5	RW	7	(Portugal) Andrezinho	4	1	5
5	CM	17	(Romania) Andrei Ciobanu	4	1	5
7	DM	8	(Portugal) João Lameira	4	0	4
7	RW	11	(Romania) Ștefan Bană	4	0	4
7	CM	24	(Romania) Denis Bordun	3	1	4
10	CB	6	(Romania) Paul Iacob	2	0	2
11	RB	2	(Bulgaria) Milen Zhelev	1	0	1
11	CB	4	(Portugal) Né Lopes	1	0	1
11	LB	88	(Brazil) Kazu	1	0	1
11	CM	18	(Cape Verde) João Paulo Fernandes	1	0	1
11	ST	15	(Romania) Dan-Cristian Neicu	1	0	1
11	CM	23	(Romania) Cristian Chira	0	1	1
11	LW	99	(Brazil) Luan Campos	1	0	1
Total				55	5	60

Source: FBREF

=== Clean sheets ===
Rank	No.	Player	Liga I	Cupa României	Total
1	1	(Romania) Cosmin Dur-Bozoancă	13	0	13
Total			13	0	13

Source: FBREF

=== Disciplinary record ===
N	P	Nat.	Name	Liga I			Cupa României			Total			Notes
N	P	Nat.	Name	Yellow card	Second yellow card	Red card	Yellow card	Second yellow card	Red card	Yellow card	Second yellow card	Red card	Notes
10	AM	(Romania)	Eric Bicfalvi	1						1			
1	GK	(Romania)	Cosmin Dur-Bozoancă	1						1			
2	RB	(Bulgaria)	Milen Zhelev	7			1			8			
4	CB	(Portugal)	Né Lopes	2						2			
8	DM	(Portugal)	João Lameira	9			1			10			
31	DM	(Croatia)	Diego Živulić	4		2	1			5		2	
7	RW	(Portugal)	Andrezinho	1						1			
17	CM	(Romania)	Andrei Ciobanu	1						1			
9	ST	(Cape Verde)	Patrick Fernandes	3			1			4			
14	RB	(Romania)	Andrei Rus	1						1			
11	RW	(Romania)	Ștefan Bană	5	1		1			6	1		
77	ST	(Portugal)	Paulinho	2						2			
5	CB	(Russia)	Vadik Murria			1						1	
24	CM	(Romania)	Denis Bordun	4						4			
88	LB	(Brazil)	Kazu	5						5			
18	CM	(Cape Verde)	João Paulo Fernandes	2			1			3			
32	GK	(Romania)	Iustin Popescu	1						1			
6	CB	(Romania)	Paul Iacob	9	1	1				9	1	1	
27	AM	(Portugal)	Pedro Nuno	5			1			6			
97	LB	(Brazil)	Conrado	3		1	1			4		1	
23	CM	(Romania)	Cristian Chira	2			1			3			
80	DM	(Angola)	Bruno Paz	1						1			
96	ST	(Croatia)	Gabriel Debeljuh	1						1			
99	LW	(Brazil)	Luan Campos	3						3			
5	MF	(Romania)	Dragoș Aftene	1						1			
Total				74	2	5	9			83	2	5	

Last updated: 18 May 2026
Source: FBREF
Only competitive matches
(yellow card) = Number of bookings; (second yellow card) = Number of sending offs after a second yellow card; (red card) = Number of sending offs by a direct red card.

=== Start formations ===
Qnt	Formation	Match(es)
21	4-3-3	
17	4-2-3-1	
3	4-4-2	
1	4-1-4-1	

Last updated: 18 May 2026
Source: Match reports in Matches
Only competitive matches.

== Club ==
=== Current technical staff ===
Role	Name
Head coach	(Croatia) Stjepan Tomas
Assistant coach	(Serbia) Vlado Šmit
Goalkeeping coach	(Romania) Iulian Olteanu
Fitness coach	(Italy) Lidio Melis
Video analyst	(Romania) Nic Constandache
Club doctor	(Romania) Ionuț Băneșanu
Physiotherapist	(Romania) Marius Matei
Masseurs	(Romania) Constantin Crăciun (Romania) Petrișor Bălan
Storemen	(Romania) Iulian Dogaru (Romania) Cristian Bahnașu
Nutritionist	(Romania) Alexandru Buză

- Last updated: 17 March 2026

== Competitions ==
=== Overall ===
	Total	Home	Away
Games played	42	20	22
Games won	16	10	6
Games drawn	11	5	6
Games lost	15	5	10
Biggest win	4–0 vs. Metaloglobus	4–0 vs. Metaloglobus	4–0 vs. UTA
Biggest loss	0–4 vs. U Cluj	1–4 vs. FCSB	0–4 vs. U Cluj
Clean sheets	13	7	6
Goals scored	62	37	25
Goals conceded	53	24	29
Goal difference	9	13	-4
Average GF per game	1.48	1.85	1.14
Average GA per game	1.26	1.2	1.32
Yellow cards	83	38	45
Red cards	7	5	2
Most appearances	Andrezinho, Patrick (42)		
Most minutes played	(Bulgaria) Zhelev (3607)		
Top scorer	(Portugal) Pedro Nuno (8)		
Top assister	Andrezinho, João Paulo (4)		
Points	59/126 (46.83%)	35/60 (58.33%)	24/66 (36.36%)
Winning rate	38.1%	50%	27.27%

Last updated: 18 May 2026
Source: Matches

=== SuperLiga ===
==== League table ====
Pos	Team	Pld	W	D	L	GF	GA	GD	Pts	Qualification
8	UTA Arad	30	11	10	9	39	44	−5	43	Advances to Play-out
9	Botoșani	30	11	9	10	37	29	+8	42	Advances to Play-out
10	Oțelul Galați	30	11	8	11	39	32	+7	41	Advances to Play-out
11	Farul Constanța	30	10	7	13	39	37	+2	37	Advances to Play-out
12	Petrolul Ploiești	30	7	11	12	24	31	−7	32	Advances to Play-out

Source: LPF (in Romanian)
Rules for classification: 1) Points; 2) Head-to-head points; 3) Head-to-head goal difference; 4) Head-to-head goals scored; 5) Goal difference; 6) Goals scored; 7) Play-off.

==== Results summary ====
Overall								Home						Away					
Pld	W	D	L	GF	GA	GD	Pts	W	D	L	GF	GA	GD	W	D	L	GF	GA	GD
39	15	10	14	57	47	+10	55	10	5	5	37	24	+13	5	5	9	20	23	−3

Last updated: 18 May 2026.
Source: Matches

==== Results by round ====
Round	1	2	3	4	5	6	7	8	9	10	11	12	13	14	15	16	17	18	19	20	21	22	23	24	25	26	27	28	29	30	31	32	33	34	35	36	37	38	39
Ground	H	A	H	A	H	A	H	A	H	H	A	H	A	H	A	A	H	A	H	A	H	A	H	A	A	H	A	H	A	H	H	A	H	A	H	A	H	H	A
Result	D	L	W	D	D	L	W	D	L	W	L	W	W	L	W	D	D	L	W	W	W	L	W	D	L	L	W	D	L	L	L	L	W	L	W	D	D	W	W
Position	13	12	8	9	9	11	10	10	10	10	10	7	6	6	6	7	7	8	7	6	6	7	6	8	9	10	9	10	10	10	10	11	10	10	10	10	11	10	9

Updated to match(es) played on 18 May 2026. Source: Matches
A = Away; H = Home; W = Win; D = Draw; L = Loss

==== Points by opponent ====
Team	Results				Points
Team	Regular		Play-out		Points
Team	Home	Away	Home	Away	Points
Argeș	2–1	0–2			3
CFR Cluj	4–1	0–1			3
Csíkszereda	3–0	1–1	2–3		4
Dinamo	2–1	0–1			3
Farul	2–2	2–3	3–2		4
FC Botoșani	0–1	0–0		1–1	2
FCSB	1–4	0–1		0–4	0
Hermannstadt	0–2	3–1	2–0		6
Metaloglobus	4–0	1–0	2–2		7
Petrolul	0–0	0–0		5–1	5
Rapid	1–1	2–0			4
Slobozia	3–0	0–0		1–2	4
U Cluj	1–2	0–4			0
U Craiova	1–0	0–1			3
UTA	2–2	4–0	2–0		7

Source: SCOG

==== Matches ====
13 July 2025 Matchday 1	Oțelul Galați	0–0	Petrolul Ploiești	Galați
18:30 EEST (UTC+03)	Bicfalvi (yellow card) 41'	(Report)	Bogdan Marian (yellow card) 24'	Stadium: Oțelul; Attendance: 6,262; Referee: Radu Petrescu

20 July 2025 Matchday 2	Farul Constanța	3–2	Oțelul Galați	Ovidiu
18:30 EEST (UTC+03)	Tănasă 2', 7'; Ișfan 87'; G. Iancu (red card) 83'	(Report)	Bană 38'; Paulinho 85', (yellow card) 81'; Lameira (yellow card) 75'	Stadium: Viitorul; Attendance: 3,382; Referee: Andrei Chivulete

27 July 2025 Matchday 3	Oțelul Galați	2–1	Dinamo București	Galați
21:30 EEST (UTC+03)	Paulinho 18'; Kazu 62'; Lameira (yellow card) 85'	(Report)	Sivis 50'; Cîrjan (yellow card) 45+6'; Armstrong (yellow card) 68'; Gnahoré (yellow card) 90+9'	Stadium: Oțelul; Attendance: 9,926; Referee: Szabolcs Kovacs

4 August 2025 Matchday 4	Unirea Slobozia	0–0	Oțelul Galați	Clinceni
19:00 EEST (UTC+03)	Dinu (yellow card) 4'; Purece (yellow card) 82'	(Report)	Murria (red card) 69'	Stadium: Clinceni; Attendance: 398; Referee: Andrei Florin

11 August 2025 Matchday 5	Oțelul Galați	1–1	Rapid București	Galați
21:30 EEST (UTC+03)	Ciobanu 33'; Kazu (yellow card) 11'	(Report)	Dobre 60'	Stadium: Oțelul; Attendance: 10,097; Referee: Viorel Flueran

18 August 2025 Matchday 6	Argeș Pitești	2–0	Oțelul Galați	Mioveni
19:00 EEST (UTC+03)	Matos 62' (pen.); Sierra 65'; Briceag (yellow card) 79'	(Report)	Kazu (yellow card) 34'; Zhelev (yellow card) 79'	Stadium: Orășenesc; Attendance: 4,170; Referee: Horia Mladinovici

24 August 2025 Matchday 7	Oțelul Galați	4–1	CFR Cluj	Galați
16:15 EEST (UTC+03)	Patrick 25', 45', 55'; Bană 76'; Živulić (yellow card) 52'; Né Lopes (yellow card) 53'	(Report)	Korenica 71'; Badamosi (yellow card) 90'; Leo Bolgado (red card) 50'	Stadium: Oțelul; Attendance: 5,729; Referee: Marian Barbu

1 September 2025 Matchday 8	Csíkszereda	1–1	Oțelul Galați	Miercurea Ciuc
18:00 EEST (UTC+03)	Anderson Ceará 49'; Dolný (yellow card) 70'; Bödő (red card) 90+1'	(Report)	João Paulo 31', (yellow card) 70'; Iacob (yellow card) 16'; Živulić (yellow card) 56'	Stadium: Municipal; Attendance: 1,500; Referee: George Găman

14 September 2025 Matchday 9	Oțelul Galați	0–1	FC Botoșani	Galați
15:45 EEST (UTC+03)	Živulić (yellow card) 72'; Pedro Nuno (yellow card) 83'; Patrick (yellow card) 84'	(Report)	Mailat 40'; Diaw (yellow card) 27'; Bordeianu (yellow card) 49'; Țigănașu (yellow card) 57'; Pavlovič (yellow card) 90+1'; Friday (yellow card) 90+4'	Stadium: Oțelul; Attendance: 4,992; Referee: Radu Petrescu

20 September 2025 Matchday 10	Oțelul Galați	1–0	Universitatea Craiova	Galați
21:00 EEST (UTC+03)	Lameira 44', (yellow card) 26'; Iacob (yellow card) 32' (yellow-red card) 90'	(Report)	Băluță (yellow card) 20'; David Matei (yellow card) 23'; Etim (yellow card) 26'; Cicâldău (yellow card) 69'	Stadium: Oțelul; Attendance: 5,511; Referee: Horațiu Feșnic

28 September 2025 Matchday 11	FCSB	1–0	Oțelul Galați	Bucharest
20:30 EEST (UTC+03)	Tănase 48' (pen.); Alhassan (yellow card) 29'; Ngezana (yellow card) 63'	(Report)	Patrick (yellow card) 78'	Stadium: Arena Națională; Attendance: 5,130; Referee: Ionuț Coza

6 October 2025 Matchday 12	Oțelul Galați	4–0	Metaloglobus	Galați
17:30 EEST (UTC+03)	Andrezinho 6'; Lameira 40', 40+1'; Bordun 75', (yellow card) 79'; Ciobanu (yellow card) 48'; Pedro Nuno (yellow card) 45'; Conrado (yellow card) 88'	(Report)	Neacșu (yellow card) 90+1'	Stadium: Oțelul; Attendance: 2,025; Referee: Iulian Călin

19 October 2025 Matchday 13	UTA Arad	0–4	Oțelul Galați	Arad
17:30 EEST (UTC+03)	Ov. Popescu (yellow card) 38' (yellow-red card)	(Report)	Pedro Nuno 31', (yellow card) 44'; Andrezinho 63'; Conrado 76' (pen.); Paulinho 87'; Chira (yellow card) 90'; Zhelev (yellow card) 54'; Iacob (yellow card) 73'	Stadium: Francisc von Neuman; Attendance: 6,957; Referee: Horațiu Feșnic

25 October 2025 Matchday 14	Oțelul Galați	1–2	Universitatea Cluj	Galați
16:00 EEST (UTC+03)	Paulinho 80'	(Report)	Lukić 70', 90+1'; Drammeh (yellow card) 12'; Cissé (yellow card) 28'; Artean (yellow card) 64'; Lefter (yellow card) 90+19'	Stadium: Oțelul; Attendance: 5,571; Referee: Andrei Chivulete

2 November 2025 Matchday 15	Hermannstadt	1–3	Oțelul Galați	Sibiu
17:45 EET (UTC+02)	Karo 14'; Antwi (yellow card) 68'; Selimović (red card) 13'	(Report)	Paulinho 39'; Andrezinho 57'; Conrado 71' (pen.); Zhelev (yellow card) 19'	Stadium: Municipal; Attendance: 2,745; Referee: Gabriel Mihuleac

8 November 2025 Matchday 16	Petrolul Ploiești	0–0	Oțelul Galați	Ploiești
14:30 EET (UTC+02)	Onguéné (yellow card) 85'; Hanca (yellow card) 90+2'	(Report)	Bordun (yellow card) 55'; Paulinho (yellow card) 57'	Stadium: Ilie Oană; Attendance: 2,500; Referee: Rareș Vidican

23 November 2025 Matchday 17	Oțelul Galați	2–2	Farul Constanța	Galați
17:30 EET (UTC+02)	Conrado 31' (pen.); Pedro Nuno 51'	(Report)	Ișfan 18' (pen.); Marković 86'; Sîrbu (yellow card) 6'; Tănasă (yellow card) 57'; Maftei (yellow card) 79'	Stadium: Oțelul; Attendance: 4,378; Referee: George Roman

29 November 2025 Matchday 18	Dinamo București	1–0	Oțelul Galați	București
20:45 EET (UTC+02)	Cîrjan 37', (yellow card) 27'	(Report)	João Paulo (yellow card) 39'; Iacob (yellow card) 81'; Patrick (yellow card) 84'	Stadium: Arcul de Triumf; Attendance: 4,800; Referee: Iulian Călin

5 December 2025 Matchday 19	Oțelul Galați	3–0	Unirea Slobozia	Galați
20:30 EET (UTC+02)	Conrado 13'; Paulinho 21'; Andrezinho 77'; Zhelev (yellow card) 85'	(Report)	Christ Afalna (yellow card) 30'	Stadium: Oțelul; Attendance: 2,748; Referee: Marcel Bîrsan

13 December 2025 Matchday 20	Rapid București	0–2	Oțelul Galați	Bucharest
20:30 EET (UTC+02)	Christensen (yellow card) 43'	(Report)	Pedro Nuno 17'; Iacob 80'	Stadium: Rapid-Giulești; Attendance: 8,137; Referee: Cristian Moldoveanu

20 December 2025 Matchday 21	Oțelul Galați	2–1	Argeș Pitești	Galați
17:00 EET (UTC+02)	Pedro Nuno 55'; Paulinho 60'; Bordun (yellow card) 21'; Lameira (yellow card) 39'	(Report)	Sadriu 87', (yellow card) 90+3'; Moldoveanu (yellow card) 1'; Matos (yellow card) 45'; Oancea (yellow card) 83'	Stadium: Oțelul; Attendance: 3,711; Referee: Horațiu Feșnic

18 January 2026 Matchday 22	CFR Cluj	1–0	Oțelul Galați	Cluj-Napoca
17:45 EET (UTC+02)	Păun 3'; Muhar (yellow card) 36'; Kun (yellow card) 41'; Biliboc (yellow card) 64'; Braun (yellow card) 87'	(Report)	Iacob (yellow card) 57'; Zhelev (yellow card) 59'; Bană (yellow card) 84'; Conrado (red card) 27'	Stadium: Dr. Constantin Rădulescu; Attendance: 1,322; Referee: George Găman

26 January 2026 Matchday 23	Oțelul Galați	3–0	Csíkszereda	Galați
17:00 EET (UTC+02)	Patrick 5'; Pedro Nuno 9', 68' (pen.)	(Report)	Anderson Ceará (yellow card) 34'; Pap (yellow card) 65'; Pászka (yellow card) 90+1'; Vereș (yellow card) 90+3'	Stadium: Oțelul; Attendance: 2,044; Referee: Sorin Vădana

2 February 2026 Matchday 24	FC Botoșani	0–0	Oțelul Galați	Botoșani
18:30 EET (UTC+02)	Țigănașu (yellow card) 68'	(Report)	Paz (yellow card) 75'; Lameira (yellow card) 90+2'	Stadium: Municipal; Attendance: 614; Referee: Szabolcs Kovacs

5 February 2026 Matchday 25	Universitatea Craiova	1–0	Oțelul Galați	Craiova
18:00 EET (UTC+02)	David Matei 61'; Băsceanu (yellow card) 90+7'	(Report)	Iacob (yellow card) 64'	Stadium: Ion Oblemenco; Attendance: 4,537; Referee: Andrei Florin

8 February 2026 Matchday 26	Oțelul Galați	1–4	FCSB	Galați
20:00 EET (UTC+02)	Zhelev 25', (yellow card) 73'; Kazu (yellow card) 90+1'; Živulić (red card) 54'	(Report)	Bîrligea 31', 43'; Olaru 66'; Tănase 79'; Alhassan (yellow card) 45+4'; Duarte (yellow card) 61'	Stadium: Oțelul; Attendance: 9,140; Referee: Marcel Bîrsan

14 February 2026 Matchday 27	Metaloglobus	0–1	Oțelul Galați	Clinceni
14:30 EET (UTC+02)	Conrado 30' (pen.); Sabater (yellow card) 20'	(Report)	Lameira (yellow card) 5'; Chira (yellow card) 90+4'	Stadium: Clinceni; Attendance: 215; Referee: Horia Mladinovici

20 February 2026 Matchday 28	Oțelul Galați	2–2	UTA Arad	Galați
17:00 EET (UTC+02)	Bană 40'; Conrado 56' (pen.); Iacob (yellow card) 53'; Bordun (yellow card) 82'	(Report)	Poulolo 11', (yellow card) 90+2'; Iacob 15'	Stadium: Oțelul; Attendance: 3,064; Referee: Viorel Flueran

27 February 2026 Matchday 29	Universitatea Cluj	4–0	Oțelul Galați	Cluj-Napoca
20:00 EET (UTC+02)	Macalou 4'; Lukić 27'; Coubiș 70'; Drammeh 75'	(Report)	Rus (yellow card) 74'; Lameira (yellow card) 78'	Stadium: Cluj Arena; Attendance: 12,450; Referee: Marcel Bîrsan

8 March 2026 Matchday 30	Oțelul Galați	0–2	Hermannstadt	Galați
14:30 EET (UTC+02)	Popescu (yellow card) 86'; Bană (yellow card) 42' (yellow-red card) 45+5'; Živulić (red card) 78'; Iacob (red card) 86'	(Report)	Chițu 63'; Neguț 85'; Karo (yellow card) 12'; Ivanov (yellow card) 55'	Stadium: Oțelul; Attendance: 4,510; Referee: Andrei Moroiță

14 March 2026 Play-out 1	Oțelul Galați	2–3	Csíkszereda	Galați
18:15 EET (UTC+02)	Né Lopes 15'; Conrado 90+5' (pen.), (yellow card) 37'; Lameira (yellow card) 88'	(Report)	Eppel 8'; Kleinheisler 50'; Jebari 62'; Trif (yellow card) 64'; Palmeș (yellow card) 90+3'; Pap (yellow card) 90+8'	Stadium: Oțelul; Referee: Szabolcs Kovacs

23 March 2026 Play-out 2	Unirea Slobozia	2–1	Oțelul Galați	Slobozia
20:30 EET (UTC+02)	Espinosa 4' (pen.); Dulcea 54'; Lungu (yellow card) 66'	(Report)	Bană 21'; Luan (yellow card) 3'	Stadium: 1 Mai; Referee: Andrei Chivulete

4 April 2026 Play-out 3	Oțelul Galați	2–0	Hermannstadt	Galați
15:00 EEST (UTC+03)	Lameira 5'; Ciobanu 54'; Živulić (yellow card) 73'; Kazu (yellow card) 90'	(Report)	Chorbadzhiyski (yellow card) 43'; Gjorgjievski (yellow card) 60'; Ivanov (yellow card) 66'; Karo (yellow card) 86'; Căpușă (yellow card) 90+1'	Stadium: Oțelul; Attendance: 3,181; Referee: Andrei Florin

11 April 2026 Play-out 4	FCSB	4–0	Oțelul Galați	Bucharest
20:00 EEST (UTC+03)	Tănase 13' (pen.); M. Popescu 20'; Olaru 22', (yellow card) 57'; Stoian 44'; Miculescu (yellow card) 67'; Arad (yellow card) 80'	(Report)	Andrezinho (yellow card) 40'; Né Lopes (yellow card) 43'	Stadium: Arena Națională; Attendance: 4,039; Referee: Gabriel Mihuleac

17 April 2026 Play-out 5	Oțelul Galați	2–0	UTA Arad	Galați
17:30 EEST (UTC+03)	Ciobanu 19' (pen.); Kazu (yellow card) 39'; Debeljuh (yellow card) 80'	(Report)	Coman (yellow card) 28'; Stolnik (yellow card) 85'; Abdallah (yellow card) 90+1'; Pospyelov (red card) 16'; Alomerovikj (red card) 90+5'	Stadium: Oțelul; Attendance: 3,627; Referee: Cristian Moldoveanu

25 April 2026 Play-out 6	FC Botoșani	1–1	Oțelul Galați	Botoșani
15:00 EEST (UTC+03)	Dumiter 90+6'; Bodișteanu (yellow card) 41'	(Report)	Ciobanu 60' (pen.); Bană (yellow card) 69'	Stadium: Municipal; Referee: Răzvan Negară

2 May 2026 Play-out 7	Oțelul Galați	2–2	Metaloglobus	Galați
15:00 EEST (UTC+03)	Patrick 74', 84'; Luan (yellow card) 47'; Bană (yellow card) 64'; Zhelev (yellow card) 90+3'	(Report)	Purece 35'; Yassine Zakir 45+2'; Abbey (yellow card) 64'; Dumitru (yellow card) 87'	Stadium: Oțelul; Attendance: 3,188; Referee: Ionela Alina Peşu

9 May 2026 Play-out 8	Oțelul Galați	3–2	Farul Constanța	Galați
18:00 EEST (UTC+03)	Conrado 39' (pen.), (yellow card) 68'; Iacob 56'; Bordun 58'; Lameira (yellow card) 14'; Dur-Bozoancă (yellow card) 90+1'; Pedro Nuno (yellow card) 90+6'	(Report)	Alibec 67', (yellow card) 90+6'; Dican 77', (yellow card) 71'; Tănasă (yellow card) 68'; Doicaru (yellow card) 87'	Stadium: Oțelul; Attendance: 4,764; Referee: Horațiu Feșnic

18 May 2026 Play-out 9	Petrolul Ploiești	1–5	Oțelul Galați	Ploiești
20:30 EEST (UTC+03)	Ignat 42'; R. Pop (red card) 0'	(Report)	Bordun 12'; Pedro Nuno 24', (yellow card) 82'; Luan 45+2', (yellow card) 27'; Dan-Cristian Neicu 87'; Patrick 89'; Iacob (yellow card) 20'; Dragoș Aftene (yellow card) 90+4'	Stadium: Ilie Oană; Attendance: 6,548; Referee: Florin Andrei

=== Cupa României ===
==== Group stage ====
Pos	Team	Pld	W	D	L	GF	GA	GD	Pts	Qualification	UCJ	MET	CSI	OTE	SEP	LIE
1	Universitatea Cluj	3	2	1	0	6	3	+3	7	Advance to knockout phase	—	—	—	2–0	—	—
2	Metalul Buzău	3	2	0	1	9	6	+3	6	Advance to knockout phase	1–2	—	—	—	1–0	—
3	Csíkszereda Miercurea Ciuc	3	1	1	1	6	2	+4	4		—	—	—	1–2	0–0	—
4	Oțelul Galați	3	1	1	1	5	6	−1	4		—	—	—	—	—	—
5	Sepsi Sfântu Gheorghe	3	0	2	1	2	3	−1	2		2–2	—	—	—	—	—
6	Sporting Liești	3	0	1	2	7	15	−8	1		—	4–7	0–5	3–3	—	—

Updated to match(es) played on 4 December 2025. Source: FRF

28 October 2025 Group-stage 1	Sporting Liești	3–3	Oțelul Galați	Liești
15:00 EET (UTC+02)	Petrișor Voinea 36'; Viorel Costea 51'; Claudiu Maftei 90+4'; Bogdan Crihană (yellow card) 54'; Adrian Grigoraș (yellow card) 69'; Alexandru Stan (yellow card) 74'	(Report)	Ciobanu 5'; Pedro Nuno 60', (yellow card) 69'; Andrezinho 63'; Živulić (yellow card) 38'; Zhelev (yellow card) 75'; João Paulo (yellow card) 85'; Chira (yellow card) 90+5'	Stadium: Comunal; Attendance: 1,820; Referee: Dan Ștefan Buzărnescu

2 December 2025 Group-stage 2	Csíkszereda	1–2	Oțelul Galați	Miercurea Ciuc
17:00 EET (UTC+02)	Eppel 76'; Csürös (yellow card) 74'; Pászka (yellow card) 22' (yellow-red card) 56'	(Report)	Chira 38'; Bordun 90+6'; Patrick (yellow card) 86'	Stadium: Municipal; Referee: Sorin Vădana

11 February 2026 Group-stage 3	Universitatea Cluj	2–0	Oțelul Galați	Cluj-Napoca
20:00 EET (UTC+02)	Lukić 52'; Coubiș 67'; Mendy (yellow card) 74'	(Report)	Bană (yellow card) 10'; Lameira (yellow card) 32'; Conrado (yellow card) 89'	Stadium: Cluj Arena; Attendance: 2,481; Referee: Andrei Chivulete

=== Friendlies ===
14 June 2025	Oțelul Galați	6–0	ACS Unirea Braniștea	Galați
11:00 EEST (UTC+03)	Hofman 3', 40'; Andrei Cubleșan 55', 59'; Dan-Cristian Neicu 66'; Bordun 84'	(Report)		Stadium: Oțelul

21 June 2025	Csíkszereda	1–1	Oțelul Galați	Ghimbav
11:00 EEST (UTC+03)	Bicfalvi 7'	(Report)	86'	Stadium: Campo Verde

27 June 2025	Farul Constanța	2–1	Oțelul Galați	București
10:30 EEST (UTC+03)	Grigoryan 12'; Tănasă 22'		Trif 60'	Stadium: Arcul de Triumf

5 July 2025	Oțelul Galați	2–1	Metalul Buzău	Galați
11:00 EEST (UTC+03)	Andrezinho 50'; Bordun 89'	(Report)	Moldovan 6'	Stadium: Oțelul

6 September 2025	Oțelul Galați	2–0	FC Bacău	Galați
11:00 EEST (UTC+03)	Paulinho 60'; Radu Postelnicu 77'	(Report)		Stadium: Oțelul

10 January 2026	Unirea Slobozia	0–0	Oțelul Galați	Slobozia
12:30 EET (UTC+02)		(Report)		Stadium: 1 Mai; Attendance: 3,500

== See also ==
- ASC Oțelul Galați
- 2025–26 Liga I
- 2025–26 Cupa României
