= Giannis Christopoulos =

Giannis Christopoulos may refer to:

- Giannis Christopoulos (footballer, born 1972)
- Giannis Christopoulos (footballer, born 2000)
