= Cosmin Dur-Bozoancă =

Romanian footballer

Personal information
- Full name: Cosmin Andrei Dur-Bozoancă
- Date of birth: 15 February 1998 (age 28)
- Place of birth: Brașov, Romania
- Height: 1.82 m (6 ft 0 in)
- Position: Goalkeeper

Team information
- Current team: Oțelul Galați
- Number: 1

Youth career
- –2012: FC Brașov
- 2012–2017: Gheorghe Hagi Academy

Senior career*
Years	Team	Apps	(Gls)
2017–2021	Viitorul Constanța	0	(0)
2017–2018	→ ASU Politehnica Timișoara (loan)	30	(0)
2018–2020	→ Universitatea Cluj (loan)	52	(0)
2020–2021	→ Farul Constanța (loan)	18	(0)
2021–	Oțelul Galați	107	(0)

International career
2014	Romania U17	1	(0)
- * Club domestic league appearances and goals as of 1 November 2026

Cosmin Andrei Dur-Bozoancă (born 15 February 1998) is a Romanian professional footballer who plays as a goalkeeper for Liga I club Oțelul Galați.

== Career statistics ==
As of match played 1 November 2026

Appearances and goals by club, season and competition
Club	Season	League			Cupa României		Other		Total	
Club	Season	Division	Apps	Goals	Apps	Goals	Apps	Goals	Apps	Goals
ASU Politehnica Timișoara (loan)	2017–18	Liga II	30	0	1	0	—		31	0
Universitatea Cluj (loan)	2018–19	Liga II	36	0	2	0	2 (Note: Appearances in Liga I promotion/relegation play-offs)	0	40	0
Universitatea Cluj (loan)	2019–20	Liga II	16	0	1	0	—		17	0
Universitatea Cluj (loan)	Total		52	0	3	0	2	0	57	0
Farul Constanța (loan)	2020–21	Liga II	18	0	2	0	—		20	0
Oțelul Galați	2021–22	Liga III	6	0	—		4 (Note: Appearances in Liga III promotion play-offs)	0	10	0
Oțelul Galați	2022–23	Liga II	24	0	2	0	—		26	0
Oțelul Galați	2023–24	Liga I	14	0	3	0	0	0	17	0
Oțelul Galați	2024–25	Liga I	14	0	2	0	—		16	0
Oțelul Galați	2025–26	Liga I	35	0	1	0	—		36	0
Oțelul Galați	2026–27	Liga I	14	0	0	0	—		14	0
Oțelul Galați	Total		107	0	8	0	4	0	119	0
Career total			207	0	14	0	6	0	227	0

== Honours ==
Oțelul Galați

- Liga III: 2021–22
- Cupa României runner-up: 2023–24
