= João Lameira =

Portuguese footballer

Personal information
- Full name: João Pedro Santos Lameira
- Date of birth: 19 April 1999 (age 27)
- Place of birth: Santa Maria da Feira, Portugal
- Height: 1.78 m (5 ft 10 in)
- Position: Midfielder

Team information
- Current team: Universitatea Craiova
- Number: 16

Youth career
- 2007–2008: Caldas São Jorge
- 2008–2011: Feirense
- 2011–2012: Sporting
- 2012–2013: Feirense
- 2013–2018: Porto
- 2014–2015: → Padroense (loan)

Senior career*
| Years | Team | Apps | (Gls) |
| 2018–2019 | Porto B | 7 | (1) |
| 2019–2020 | União Leiria | 16 | (2) |
| 2020 | → Académica (loan) | 0 | (0) |
| 2020–2021 | Real SC | 25 | (2) |
| 2021–2023 | Torreense | 55 | (2) |
| 2023–2025 | Baltika Kaliningrad | 2 | (0) |
| 2024–2025 | → Oțelul Galați (loan) | 52 | (1) |
| 2025–2026 | Oțelul Galați | 41 | (6) |
| 2026– | Universitatea Craiova | 5 | (0) |

International career
| 2015 | Portugal U16 | 9 | (1) |
| 2015–2016 | Portugal U17 | 14 | (0) |
| 2016–2017 | Portugal U18 | 7 | (0) |
| 2017 | Portugal U20 | 2 | (0) |
Medal record
Men's football
Representing Portugal
UEFA European U17 Championship
| Winner | Azerbaijan 2016 |
- * Club domestic league appearances and goals as of 1 November 2026

João Pedro Santos Lameira (born 19 April 1999) is a Portuguese professional footballer who plays as a midfielder for Liga I club Universitatea Craiova.

== Club career ==
Born in Santa Maria da Feira, Lameira had two spells at hometown club C.D. Feirense as a youth, either side of one season at Sporting CP. In 2013, he joined FC Porto's ranks, and on 22 September 2018, he made his professional debut with the reserve team in a LigaPro match against U.D. Oliveirense; he came on as an added-time substitute for Madi Queta in a 1–1 away draw. He played seven games over the season, scoring once on the final day on 18 May 2019 in a 2–2 draw away to Vitória de Guimarães B.

Lameira signed for U.D. Leiria in the third-tier Campeonato de Portugal ahead of the 2019–20 season; he was described by José Roque of the Diário de Leiria as their best signing that transfer window. On 31 January 2020 he moved back up to the second tier on an 18-month deal with Académica de Coimbra; unused, he moved back to the third level and Real S.C. in June.

On 7 July 2021, Lameira signed a one-year deal at S.C.U. Torreense of the new Liga 3. He played 25 times as they won promotion as champions in his first season, scoring once as the winner in a 2–1 comeback victory at home to F.C. Felgueiras 1932 on 2 April 2022. He then signed for another season. He played 30 times as the Torres Vedras-based club came 9th in the second tier, scoring once in a 3–0 home win over former club Porto B on 11 March 2023.

On 8 June 2023, Lameira signed a three-year contract with the Russian Premier League club Baltika Kaliningrad. On 16 January 2024, Lameira moved to Romanian club Oțelul Galați on loan with an option to buy. In June 2025, the player was transferred to the Liga I team, signing a two-year contract.

== Career statistics ==
As of match played 5 November 2026

Appearances and goals by club, season and competition
| Club | Season | League | | | National cup (Note: Includes Taça de Portugal, Russian Cup, Cupa României) | | League cup (Note: Includes Taça da Liga) | | Europe | | Other | | Total | |
| Club | Season | Division | Apps | Goals | Apps | Goals | Apps | Goals | Apps | Goals | Apps | Goals | Apps | Goals |
|---|---|---|---|---|---|---|---|---|---|---|---|---|---|---|
| Porto B | 2018–19 | Liga Portugal 2 | 7 | 1 | — | | — | | — | | — | | 7 | 1 |
| União Leiria | 2019–20 | Campeonato de Portugal | 16 | 2 | — | | — | | — | | — | | 16 | 2 |
| Académica (loan) | 2020–21 | Liga Portugal 2 | 0 | 0 | 0 | 0 | 0 | 0 | — | | — | | 0 | 0 |
| Real SC | 2020–21 | Campeonato de Portugal | 25 | 2 | 1 | 0 | — | | — | | — | | 26 | 2 |
| Torreense | 2021–22 | Liga Portugal 2 | 25 | 1 | 2 | 0 | 0 | 0 | — | | — | | 27 | 1 |
| Torreense | 2022–23 | Liga Portugal 2 | 30 | 1 | 1 | 0 | 4 | 0 | — | | — | | 36 | 1 |
| Torreense | Total | | 55 | 1 | 3 | 0 | 4 | 0 | — | | — | | 63 | 1 |
| Baltika Kaliningrad | 2023–24 | Russian Premier League | 2 | 0 | 4 | 0 | — | | — | | — | | 5 | 0 |
| Oțelul Galați (loan) | 2023–24 | Liga I | 17 | 1 | 3 | 1 | — | | — | | 1 (Note: Appearance in Liga I European play-offs) | 0 | 21 | 2 |
| Oțelul Galați (loan) | 2024–25 | Liga I | 35 | 0 | 3 | 0 | — | | — | | — | | 38 | 0 |
| Oțelul Galați | 2025–26 | Liga I | 34 | 4 | 2 | 0 | — | | — | | — | | 36 | 4 |
| Oțelul Galați | 2026–27 | Liga I | 7 | 2 | 0 | 0 | — | | — | | — | | 7 | 2 |
| Oțelul Galați | Total | | 93 | 7 | 8 | 1 | — | | — | | 1 | 0 | 102 | 8 |
| Universitatea Craiova | 2026–27 | Liga I | 5 | 0 | 2 | 0 | — | | 3 (Note: Appearances in UEFA Conference League) | 0 | — | | 10 | 0 |
| Career total | | | 203 | 14 | 18 | 1 | 4 | 0 | 3 | 0 | 1 | 0 | 229 | 15 |

== Honours ==
Torreense

- Liga 3: 2021–22

Oțelul Galați

- Cupa României runner-up: 2023–24

Portugal U17

- UEFA European Under-17 Championship: 2016
