= Andrezinho (footballer, born 1996) =

Portuguese footballer

Andrézinho
Personal information
- Full name: André Miguel Pinto Lopes
- Date of birth: 1 December 1996 (age 29)
- Place of birth: Lisbon, Portugal
- Height: 1.74 m (5 ft 8 1/2 in)
- Positions: Winger; attacking midfielder

Team information
- Current team: Oțelul Galați
- Number: 10

Youth career
- 2004–2007: Carregado
- 2007–2009: Benfica
- 2009–2014: Carregado
- 2014–2015: Alverca

Senior career*
Years	Team	Apps	(Gls)
2015–2017	Alverca	49	(10)
2017–2019	Casa Pia	58	(9)
2019–2020	Alverca	23	(3)
2020–2022	Mafra	48	(8)
2022	DAC Dunajská Streda	11	(0)
2022–2025	Santa Clara	26	(2)
2024–2025	→ Alverca (loan)	34	(6)
2025–	Oțelul Galați	51	(5)
- * Club domestic league appearances and goals as of 1 November 2026

André Miguel Pinto Lopes (born 1 December 1996), known as Andrézinho, is a Portuguese professional footballer who plays as a winger or an attacking midfielder for Liga I club Oțelul Galați.

== Club career ==
On 13 September 2020, Andrezinho made his professional debut with Mafra in a Liga Portugal 2 match against Cova da Piedade.

In June 2025, the player moved to Oțelul Galați from Liga I, signing a two-year contract.

== Career statistics ==
As of match played 1 November 2026

Appearances and goals by club, season and competition
Club	Season	League			National cup (Note: Includes Taça de Portugal)		League cup (Note: Includes Taça da Liga)		Other		Total	
Club	Season	Division	Apps	Goals	Apps	Goals	Apps	Goals	Apps	Goals	Apps	Goals
Alverca	2014–15	AF Lisboa 1 Divisão	8	6	0	0	—		—		8	6
Alverca	2015–16	AF Lisboa 1 Divisão	20	0	1	0	—		—		21	4
Alverca	2016–17	AF Lisboa 1 Divisão	21	4	5	0	—		—		26	4
Alverca	Total		49	10	6	0	—		—		55	14
Casa Pia	2017–18	Campeonato de Portugal	24	3	2	0	—		—		26	3
Casa Pia	2018–19	Campeonato de Portugal	34	6	3	0	—		—		37	6
Casa Pia	Total		58	9	5	0	—		—		63	9
Alverca	2019–20	Campeonato de Portugal	23	3	4	1	—		—		27	4
Mafra	2020–21	Liga Portugal 2	31	5	1	0	1	1	—		33	6
Mafra	2021–22	Liga Portugal 2	17	3	5	1	2	1	—		24	5
Mafra	Total		48	8	6	1	3	2	—		57	11
DAC Dunajská Streda	2021–22	Slovak First Football League	11	0	—		—		1 (Note: Appearance in Slovak First Football League European play-offs)	0	12	0
DAC Dunajská Streda	2022–23	Slovak First Football League	—		—		—		1 (Note: Appearance in UEFA Europa Conference League)	0	1	0
DAC Dunajská Streda	Total		11	0	—		—		2	0	13	0
Santa Clara	2022–23	Primeira Liga	18	1	0	0	4	0	—		22	1
Santa Clara	2023–24	Liga Portugal 2	8	1	2	0	1	0	—		11	1
Santa Clara	Total		26	2	2	0	5	0	—		33	2
Alverca (loan)	2024–25	Liga Portugal 2	34	6	2	0	—		—		36	6
Oțelul Galați	2025–26	Liga I	39	4	3	1	—		—		42	5
Oțelul Galați	2026–27	Liga I	12	1	0	0	—		—		12	1
Oțelul Galați	Total		51	5	3	1	—		—		54	6
Career total			300	43	28	3	8	2	2	0	338	48

== Honours ==
Casa Pia

- Campeonato de Portugal: 2018–19

Santa Clara

- Liga Portugal 2: 2023–24
