= Paulinho (footballer, born 1999) =

Portuguese footballer (born 1999)

Personal information
- Full name: Paulo Rafael Pereira Araújo
- Date of birth: 21 September 1999 (age 27)
- Place of birth: Braga, Portugal
- Height: 1.86 m (6 ft 1 in)
- Position: Forward

Team information
- Current team: Académico de Viseu (on loan from Wieczysta Kraków)
- Number: 77

Youth career
- 2008–2010: Ferreirense
- 2010–2011: Braga
- 2011–2013: Ferreirense
- 2013–2014: Arsenal da Devesa
- 2014–2015: Os Alegrienses
- 2015–2016: Vizela
- 2016–2018: Merelinense

Senior career*
| Years | Team | Apps | (Gls) |
| 2018–2020 | São Paio D'Arcos | 47 | (25) |
| 2020–2021 | Fafe | 24 | (8) |
| 2021–2023 | Estrela da Amadora | 39 | (15) |
| 2023–2025 | Viborg | 11 | (1) |
| 2023–2024 | → Portimonense (loan) | 8 | (0) |
| 2024 | → Torreense (loan) | 15 | (2) |
| 2024–2025 | → Bandırmaspor (loan) | 35 | (8) |
| 2025–2026 | Oțelul Galați | 20 | (7) |
| 2026– | Wieczysta Kraków | 14 | (1) |
| 2026 | Wieczysta Kraków II | 1 | (2) |
| 2026– | → Académico de Viseu (loan) | 0 | (0) |
- * Club domestic league appearances and goals as of 09:51, 22 August 2026 (UTC)

Paulo Rafael Pereira Araújo (born 21 September 1999), known as Paulinho, is a Portuguese professional footballer who plays as a forward for Primeira Liga club Académico de Viseu, on loan from Ekstraklasa club Wieczysta Kraków.

== Career ==
Paulinho started his career at FC Ferreirense in Braga, and later also played for S.C. Braga, Arsenal da Devesa, Os Alegrienses, Vizela and Merelinense. As a senior, he started out at São Paio D'Arcos, where he played from 2018 until 2020. Ahead of the 2021–22 season, Paulinho moved to Fafe, which at the time played in the Portuguese fourth tier, Campeonato de Portugal. At Fafe, Paulinho played 24 league games, scoring 8 goals.

In June 2021, Paulinho signed a two-year deal Estrela da Amadora. During his one and a half seasons at Estrela, he played 44 games and scored 19 goals.

At the end of January 2023, Paulinho joined Danish Superliga side Viborg, signing a deal until June 2026. After managing just 1 goal in 13 appearances in all competitions, in June 2023 he was loaned to Primeira Liga club Portimonense for the upcoming season. After Paulinho failing to score for 9 appearances in all competitions for the Portimão-based club, for the second half of the season, Viborg ended his spell at Portimonense and instead loaned him to Liga Portugal 2 side Torreense, with an option-to-buy. After the loan spell, Paulinho was not involved in the pre-season in Viborg, as the club had announced that the player was not part of the plans and was exploring the possibilities of finding a new club.

On 1 July 2024, Paulinho was sent out on another loan spell, this time at Turkish TFF First League side Bandırmaspor for the 2024–25 season.

In July 2025, the player moved to Oțelul Galați from Liga I, signing a two-year contract.

On 6 January 2026, Paulinho transferred to Polish second division club Wieczysta Kraków on a two-and-a-half-year contract.

On 21 August 2026, he was sent on loan to Académico de Viseu in his home country, with an option to buy.

== Honours ==
Wieczysta Kraków II

- IV liga Lesser Poland: 2025–26
