= Andrei Rus =

Romanian footballer

Personal information
- Full name: Silviu Andrei Rus
- Date of birth: 14 May 2002 (age 24)
- Place of birth: Gherla, Romania
- Height: 1.76 m (5 ft 9 in)
- Position: Defender

Team information
- Current team: CS Dinamo București
- Number: 25

Youth career
- Viitorul Gherla
- Pro FA FC
- Potters Bar Town
- Ipswich Town
- –2019: Hertford Town

Senior career*
Years	Team	Apps	(Gls)
2020–2021	Alki Oroklini		
2021–2026	Oțelul Galați	82	(2)
2026–	CS Dinamo București	12	(3)
- * Club domestic league appearances and goals as of 30 October 2026

Silviu Andrei Rus (born 14 May 2002) is a Romanian professional footballer who plays as a defender for Liga II club CS Dinamo București.

== Club career ==
He made his professional debut on 14 July 2023 in Liga I match against UTA Arad.

== Career statistics ==
As of match played 30 October 2026

Appearances and goals by club, season and competition
Club	Season	League			Cupa României		Other		Total	
Club	Season	Division	Apps	Goals	Apps	Goals	Apps	Goals	Apps	Goals
Oțelul Galați	2021–22	Liga III	26	2	1	0	4 (Note: Appearance in Liga III promotion play-offs)	0	31	2
Oțelul Galați	2022–23	Liga II	26	0	4	0	—		30	0
Oțelul Galați	2023–24	Liga I	13	0	3	0	1 (Note: Appearance in Liga I European play-offs)	0	17	0
Oțelul Galați	2024–25	Liga I	8	0	0	0	—		8	0
Oțelul Galați	2025–26	Liga I	9	0	1	0	—		10	0
Oțelul Galați	Total		82	2	9	0	5	0	96	2
CS Dinamo București	2026–27	Liga II	12	3	1	0	—		13	3
Career total			94	5	10	0	5	0	109	5

== Honours ==
Oțelul Galați

- Liga III: 2021–22
- Cupa României runner-up: 2023–24
