= Mario Contra =

Romanian footballer (born 1999)

Personal information
- Full name: Mario Roberto Mihai Contra
- Date of birth: 15 September 1999 (age 27)
- Place of birth: Timișoara, Romania
- Height: 1.86 m (6 ft 1 in)
- Position: Goalkeeper

Team information
- Current team: Oțelul Galați
- Number: 13

Youth career
- –2017: ACS Poli Timișoara

Senior career*
Years	Team	Apps	(Gls)
2016–2019	ACS Poli Timișoara	10	(0)
2018	→ Ripensia Timișoara (loan)	5	(0)
2019–2020	ASU Politehnica Timișoara	6	(0)
2020–2022	Botoșani	2	(0)
2022–2023	Unirea Slobozia	19	(0)
2023–2024	CSM Reșița	5	(0)
2024–2026	Chindia Târgoviște	39	(0)
2026–	Oțelul Galați	0	(0)
- * Club domestic league appearances and goals as of 16 July 2026

Mario Roberto Mihai Contra (born 15 September 1999) is a Romanian professional footballer who plays as a goalkeeper for Liga I club Oțelul Galați.

== Career ==
On 18 June 2026, the player moved to Oțelul Galați from Liga I, signing a two-year contract with an option to extend it for another year.

== Honours ==
ACS Poli Timișoara

- Cupa Ligii runner-up: 2016–17
