= Răzvan Mărincean =

Romanian footballer (born 2009)

Personal information
- Full name: Răzvan Paul Mărincean
- Date of birth: 27 February 2009 (age 17)
- Place of birth: Sighetu Marmației, Romania
- Height: 1.85 m (6 ft 1 in)
- Position: Left winger

Team information
- Current team: Farul Constanța
- Number: 99

Youth career
- –2021: Plimob Sighet
- 2021–: Gheorghe Hagi Academy

Senior career*
Years	Team	Apps	(Gls)
2025–	Farul Constanța	9	(2)

International career^{‡}
2023	Romania U15	2	(2)
2025–2026	Romania U17	9	(2)
2026–	Romania U18	2	(0)
- * Club domestic league appearances and goals as of 25 October 2026 ‡ National team caps and goals as of 2 October 2026

Răzvan Paul Mărincean (born 27 February 2009) is a Romanian professional footballer who plays as a left winger for Liga I club Farul Constanța.

== Career statistics ==
As of match played 25 October 2026

Appearances and goals by club, season and competition
Club	Season	League			Cupa României		Europe		Other		Total	
Club	Season	Division	Apps	Goals	Apps	Goals	Apps	Goals	Apps	Goals	Apps	Goals
Farul Constanța	2025–26	Liga I	1	0	2	0	—		0	0	3	0
Farul Constanța	2026–27	Liga I	8	2	1	0	—		—		9	2
Career total			9	2	3	0	—		0	0	12	2
