= João Paulino Moreira Fernandes =

Cape Verdean footballer (born 1998)

João Paulino
Personal information
- Full name: João Paulino Moreira Fernandes
- Date of birth: 26 May 1998 (age 28)
- Place of birth: Ribeira Grande de Santiago, Cape Verde
- Height: 1.81 m (5 ft 11 in)
- Position: Left winger

Team information
- Current team: Oțelul Galați
- Number: 7

Youth career
- –2015: Tchadense

Senior career*
Years	Team	Apps	(Gls)
2016–2017	Tchadense		
2017–2018	Sporting Praia		
2018–2019	Maria da Fonte	21	(2)
2019–2021	Leça	42	(2)
2021–2022	Salgueiros	10	(0)
2022–2023	Leça	25	(5)
2023–2025	Zimbru Chișinău	27	(13)
2025	Politehnica Iași	0	(0)
2025	→ Ordabasy (loan)	17	(2)
2026–	Oțelul Galați	9	(0)

International career
2019	Cape Verde U19	2	(1)
- * Club domestic league appearances and goals as of 16 October 2026

João Paulino Moreira Fernandes (born 26 May 1998), commonly known as João Paulino, is a Cape Verdean professional footballer who plays as a left winger for Liga I club Oțelul Galați.

== Club career ==
João Paulino began his career in Cape Verde with Tchadense before moving to Europe. During his professional career, he played in Portugal, Romania and Kazakhstan. In January 2025, he joined Politehnica Iași, and was subsequently loaned to the Kazakh club Ordabasy for the remainder of the 2025 season.

On 10 June 2026, the player moved to Oțelul Galați from Liga I, signing a two-year contract.

== International career ==
Paulino represented the Cape Verde under-19 national team, for which he made two appearances and scored one goal.

== Honours ==
Sporting Praia

- Taça Nacional de Cabo Verde: 2018

Zimbru Chișinău

- Cupa Moldovei runner-up: 2023–24

Ordabasy

- Kazakhstan Cup runner-up: 2025

== Personal life ==
João Paulino is the twin brother of fellow Cape Verdean footballer João Paulo, who has played professionally in Portugal, Moldova and Romania.
