= Gideon Goodlad =

Nigerian footballer (born 2005)

Personal information
- Full name: Gideon Uche Goodlad
- Date of birth: 16 January 2005 (age 21)
- Place of birth: Kaduna, Nigeria
- Height: 1.83 m (6 ft 0 in)
- Position: Midfielder

Team information
- Current team: Corvinul Hunedoara
- Number: 47

Youth career
- –2023: Ikon Allah Football Academy
- 2023–2024: Maccabi Petah Tikva

Senior career*
Years	Team	Apps	(Gls)
2024–2025	Sheriff Tiraspol	6	(0)
2025–2026	Étoile du Sahel	4	(0)
2026–	Corvinul Hunedoara	22	(5)
- * Club domestic league appearances and goals as of 23 October 2026

Gideon Uche Goodlad (born 16 January 2005) is a Nigerian professional footballer who plays as a midfielder for Liga I club Corvinul Hunedoara.

== Honours ==
Sheriff Tiraspol

- Cupa Moldovei: 2024–25

Corvinul Hunedoara

- Liga II: 2025–26
