= Habib Sylla =

Ivorian footballer (born 1999)

Personal information
- Date of birth: 12 February 1999 (age 27)
- Place of birth: Agboville, Ivory Coast
- Height: 1.78 m (5 ft 10 in)
- Position: Right back

Team information
- Current team: Oțelul Galați
- Number: 5

Youth career
- –2017: Olympic Abobo
- 2017–2018: Vitória Guimarães

Senior career*
Years	Team	Apps	(Gls)
2018–2020	Vitória Guimarães U23	13	(0)
2020–2021	Marinhense	19	(0)
2021–2022	União Leiria	27	(3)
2022–2024	Chaves	16	(0)
2024–2026	União Leiria	54	(1)
2026–	Oțelul Galați	11	(0)
- * Club domestic league appearances and goals as of 1 November 2026

Habib Sylla (born 12 February 1999) is an Ivorian professional footballer who plays as a right back for Liga I club Oțelul Galați.

== Career ==
Born in Agboville, Sylla was playing for Stars Olympic Football Club d'Abobo when he signed for Portugal's Vitória de Guimarães on 30 August 2017. Fellow teenage Ivorian fullback Kouya Mabea joined on the same day from SOA.

Sylla played up to under-23 level at Vitória, leaving in 2020 for A.C. Marinhense of the third-tier Campeonato de Portugal. In 2021–22 he represented União de Leiria in the new Liga 3, totalling 31 games, three goals and four assists.

On 29 June 2022, 23-year-old Sylla jumped two divisions by signing for G.D. Chaves in the Primeira Liga. In October 2023, he suffered a long-term injury, for which Carraça was signed as cover.

Sylla returned to Leiria, now in Liga Portugal 2, on a two-year contract on 8 July 2024.

On 17 June 2026, the player moved to Oțelul Galați from Liga I, signing a two-year contract.
