= Răzvan Tănasă =

Romanian footballer

Personal information
- Full name: Răzvan Andrei Tănasă
- Date of birth: 28 April 2003 (age 23)
- Place of birth: Constanța, Romania
- Height: 1.72 m (5 ft 8 in)
- Position: Winger

Team information
- Current team: Farul Constanța
- Number: 71

Youth career
- 2009–2023: Gheorghe Hagi Academy

Senior career*
Years	Team	Apps	(Gls)
2022–	Farul Constanța	48	(6)
2022	→ Gloria Bistrița-Năsăud (loan)	15	(3)
2023–2025	→ Oțelul Galați (loan)	63	(6)

International career
2021–2022	Romania U19	8	(1)
2023	Romania U20	1	(0)
- * Club domestic league appearances and goals as of 7 November 2026

Răzvan Andrei Tănasă (born 28 April 2003) is a Romanian professional footballer who plays as a winger for Liga I club Farul Constanța.

== Club career ==
=== Oțelul Galați ===
He made his league debut on 7 August 2023 in Liga I match against Sepsi OSK.

== Career statistics ==
As of match played 7 November 2026

Appearances and goals by club, season and competition
Club	Season	League			Cupa României		Europe		Other		Total	
Club	Season	Division	Apps	Goals	Apps	Goals	Apps	Goals	Apps	Goals	Apps	Goals
Gloria Bistrița-Năsăud (loan)	2022–23	Liga III	15	3	2	0	—		—		17	2
Oțelul Galați (loan)	2023–24	Liga I	29	1	6	0	—		1 (Note: Appearance in Liga I European play-offs)	0	36	1
Oțelul Galați (loan)	2024–25	Liga I	34	5	3	1	—		—		37	6
Oțelul Galați (loan)	Total		63	6	9	1	—		1	0	73	7
Farul Constanța	2025–26	Liga I	38	5	3	1	—		2 (Note: Appearances in Liga I promotion/relegation play-offs)	0	43	6
Farul Constanța	2026–27	Liga I	10	1	1	0	—		—		11	1
Farul Constanța	Total		48	6	4	1	—		2	0	54	7
Career total			126	15	15	2	—		3	0	144	17

== Honours ==
Oțelul Galați

- Cupa României runner-up: 2023–24
