= Vadik Murria =

Spanish footballer (born 2000)

Personal information
- Full name: Vadim Murria Soriano
- Date of birth: 7 September 2000 (age 26)
- Place of birth: Kemerovo, Russia
- Height: 1.88 m (6 ft 2 in)
- Position: Centre-back

Team information
- Current team: Unionistas
- Number: 16

Youth career
- –2020: Villarreal
- 2017–2018: → Roda (loan)

Senior career*
Years	Team	Apps	(Gls)
2019–2020	Villarreal C	19	(0)
2020–2022	Villarreal B	15	(0)
2022–2024	Intercity	58	(5)
2024–2025	Tarazona	35	(0)
2025	Oțelul Galați	11	(0)
2026–	Unionistas	18	(2)
- * Club domestic league appearances and goals as of 9 June 2026

Vadim "Vadik" Murria Soriano (Russian: Вадим "Вадiк" Муррия Сориано; born 7 September 2000) is a Spanish professional footballer who plays as a centre-back for Primera Federación club Unionistas.
