= Rafael Brito =

Portuguese footballer

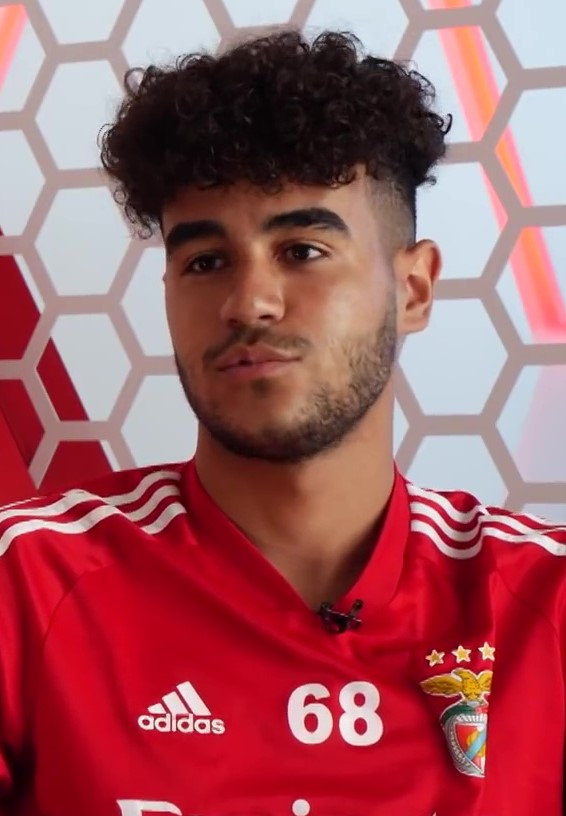
- Brito in 2020

Personal information
- Full name: Rafael Alexandre de Sousa Gancho de Brito
- Date of birth: 19 January 2002 (age 24)
- Place of birth: Almada, Portugal
- Height: 1.83 m (6 ft 0 in)
- Position: Defensive midfielder

Team information
- Current team: Oțelul Galați
- Number: 8

Youth career
- 2010–2020: Benfica

Senior career*
Years	Team	Apps	(Gls)
2019–2021	Benfica U23	14	(2)
2019–2023	Benfica B	63	(0)
2022–2023	→ Marítimo (loan)	13	(0)
2023–2026	Casa Pia	56	(2)
2026–	Oțelul Galați	6	(1)

International career^{‡}
2017	Portugal U15	1	(0)
2017–2018	Portugal U16	6	(0)
2018–2019	Portugal U17	15	(0)
2019	Portugal U19	4	(0)
2021–2022	Portugal U20	6	(0)
- * Club domestic league appearances and goals as of 1 November 2026 ‡ National team caps and goals as of 11 August 2023

Rafael Alexandre de Sousa Gancho de Brito (born 19 January 2002) is a Portuguese professional footballer who plays as a defensive midfielder for Liga I club Oțelul Galați.

== Football career ==
Born in Almada, Brito made his professional debut with Benfica B in a 2–1 win over Estoril Praia in LigaPro on 11 August 2019.

On 29 June 2022, Benfica sent Brito on a season-long loan to Primeira Liga side Marítimo.

On 1 July 2023, Benfica announced the permanent transfer of Brito to Primeira Liga side Casa Pia, while retaining a 50% share of the player's economic rights.

On 5 September 2026, the player moved to Oțelul Galați from Liga I, signing a two-year contract.
