= Patrick Fernandes =

Cape Verdean footballer

Patrick
Personal information
- Full name: Fábio Patrick dos Reis dos Santos Fernandes
- Date of birth: 13 December 1993 (age 32)
- Place of birth: Praia, Cape Verde
- Height: 1.90 m (6 ft 3 in)
- Position: Forward

Team information
- Current team: Oțelul Galați
- Number: 9

Youth career
- –2013: Boavista Praia

Senior career*
Years	Team	Apps	(Gls)
2014–2016	Boavista Praia		
2016–2017	Oliveira do Hospital	25	(20)
2017–2018	Felgueiras 1932	23	(15)
2018–2019	Tondela	9	(1)
2019–2021	Farense	17	(2)
2021	→ Varzim	16	(4)
2021–2022	Chaves	36	(2)
2023–2024	Torreense	50	(10)
2024–2025	Marítimo	30	(2)
2025–	Oțelul Galați	51	(11)

International career^{‡}
2018–2024	Cape Verde	4	(0)
- * Club domestic league appearances and goals as of 1 November 2026 ‡ National team caps and goals as of 30 March 2021

Fábio Patrick dos Reis dos Santos Fernandes (born 13 December 1993), better known as Patrick, is a Cape Verdean professional footballer who plays as a forward or winger for Liga I club Oțelul Galați.

== Club career ==
Patrick began playing football in Portugal in 2016 with Oliveira do Hospital, and had a prolific season with 22 goals in 27 games. He had another successful season with Felgueiras 1932 in 2017, and on 28 July 2018 signed his first professional contract with Tondela in the Primeira Liga.

On 8 August 2019, he moved to LigaPro club Farense on a two-year contract.

On 20 December 2022, Patrick signed with Torreense.

In June 2025, the player moved to Oțelul Galați from Liga I, signing a two-year contract.

== International career ==
Patrick made his debut for the Cape Verde national team in a 0–0 (4–3) penalty shootout win over Andorra on 3 June 2018.

== Career statistics ==
As of match played 30 March 2021

Appearances and goals by national team and year
National team	Year	Apps	Goals
Cape Verde	2018	1	0
Cape Verde	2019	0	0
Cape Verde	2020	1	0
Cape Verde	2021	2	0
Cape Verde	2024	0	0
Total		4	0
