= Cristian Chira =

Romanian footballer (born 2001)

Personal information
- Full name: Cristian Octavian Mihai Chira
- Date of birth: 8 November 2001 (age 25)
- Place of birth: Dej, Romania
- Height: 1.77 m (5 ft 10 in)
- Position: Midfielder

Team information
- Current team: CSM Reșița
- Number: 40

Youth career
- –2016: Universitatea Cluj
- 2016–2018: Viitorul Mihai Georgescu
- 2018–2020: CFR Cluj

Senior career*
Years	Team	Apps	(Gls)
2020–2023	CFR Cluj	0	(0)
2020–2023	→ Unirea Dej (loan)	61	(4)
2023–2024	Unirea Dej	10	(1)
2024–2026	Oțelul Galați	16	(0)
2026–	CSM Reșița	11	(2)
- * Club domestic league appearances and goals as of 1 November 2026

Cristian Octavian Mihai Chira (born 8 November 2001) is a Romanian professional footballer who plays as a midfielder for Liga II club CSM Reșița.
