= Denis Bordun =

Romanian footballer (born 2007)

Personal information
- Full name: Denis Marian Bordun
- Date of birth: 24 September 2005 (age 21)
- Place of birth: Galați, Romania
- Height: 1.75 m (5 ft 9 in)
- Position: Winger

Team information
- Current team: Oțelul Galați
- Number: 24

Youth career
- 2015–2024: Oțelul Galați

Senior career*
| Years | Team | Apps | (Gls) |
| 2022– | Oțelul Galați | 39 | (6) |
| 2024–2025 | → Unirea Braniștea (loan) | 27 | (16) |
- * Club domestic league appearances and goals as of 1 November 2026

Denis Marian Bordun (born 24 September 2005) is a Romanian professional footballer who plays as a winger for Liga I club Oțelul Galați.

== Career statistics ==
As of match played 1 November 2026

Appearances and goals by club, season and competition
| Club | Season | League | | | Cupa României | | Europe | | Other | | Total | |
| Club | Season | Division | Apps | Goals | Apps | Goals | Apps | Goals | Apps | Goals | Apps | Goals |
|---|---|---|---|---|---|---|---|---|---|---|---|---|
| Oțelul Galați | 2022–23 | Liga II | 1 | 0 | 0 | 0 | — | | — | | 1 | 0 |
| Oțelul Galați | 2025–26 | Liga I | 24 | 3 | 3 | 1 | — | | — | | 27 | 4 |
| Oțelul Galați | 2026–27 | Liga I | 14 | 3 | 1 | 1 | — | | — | | 15 | 4 |
| Oțelul Galați | Total | | 39 | 6 | 4 | 2 | — | | — | | 43 | 8 |
| Unirea Braniștea (loan) | 2024–25 | Liga III | 27 | 16 | 0 | 0 | — | | 4 (Note: Appearances in Liga III promotion play-offs) | 2 | 31 | 18 |
| Career total | | | 66 | 22 | 4 | 2 | — | | 4 | 2 | 74 | 26 |

== Honours ==
Unirea Braniștea

- Liga III: 2024–25
