= Né Lopes =

Portuguese association footballer

Personal information
- Full name: Manuel Alberto Cunha Lopes
- Date of birth: 29 May 2000 (age 26)
- Place of birth: Braga, Portugal
- Height: 1.85 m (6 ft 1 in)
- Position: Centre-back

Team information
- Current team: Oțelul Galați
- Number: 4

Youth career
- 2010–2015: Braga
- 2014–2015: → Palmeiras FC (loan)
- 2015–2019: Gil Vicente

Senior career*
Years	Team	Apps	(Gls)
2019–2024	Gil Vicente	10	(0)
2019–2020	→ Leça (loan)	11	(0)
2020–2021	→ Espinho (loan)	19	(2)
2021–2022	→ Felgueiras (loan)	22	(2)
2024–2025	Torreense	32	(2)
2025–	Oțelul Galați	23	(1)
- * Club domestic league appearances and goals as of 24 July 2026

Manuel Alberto Cunha Lopes (born 29 May 2000), known as Né Lopes, is a Portuguese professional footballer who plays as a centre-back for Liga I club Oțelul Galați.

== Career ==
Lopes is a youth product of Braga and Gil Vicente. He began his senior career on loan with Leça in the Campeonato de Portugal for the 2019-20 season. On 7 October 2020, he signed his first professional contract with Gil Vicente. For the 2020-21 season, he went to Espinho in the Liga 3, and returned on loan to the league the following season with Felgueiras. He made his professional debut with Gil Vicente in a 3–1 Primeira Liga loss to Benfica on 13 November 2022.

On 1 February 2024, Lopes joined Liga Portugal 2 Torreense.

In July 2025, the player moved to Oțelul Galați from Liga I, signing a two-year contract.
