= Iustin Popescu =

Romanian footballer

Personal information
- Full name: Alin Iustin Popescu
- Date of birth: 1 September 1993 (age 33)
- Place of birth: Craiova, Romania
- Height: 1.84 m (6 ft 0 in)
- Position: Goalkeeper

Team information
- Current team: CSM Reșița
- Number: 77

Youth career
- –2010: Școala de Fotbal Gheorghe Popescu
- 2010–2012: Chindia Târgoviște

Senior career*
Years	Team	Apps	(Gls)
2012–2014	Chindia Târgoviște		
2014	Fortuna Poiana Câmpina	15	(0)
2015–2018	Dinamo București	1	(0)
2015	→ Berceni (loan)	9	(0)
2016	→ Petrolul Ploiești (loan)	2	(0)
2016	→ Unirea Tărlungeni (loan)	11	(0)
2017–2018	→ Chindia Târgoviște (loan)	27	(0)
2018–2020	Chindia Târgoviște	4	(0)
2020–2023	Mioveni	63	(0)
2023	Concordia Chiajna	4	(0)
2023–2024	Chindia Târgoviște	11	(0)
2024–2026	Oțelul Galați	30	(0)
2026	CSM Reșița	12	(0)

International career
2010	Romania U17	1	(0)
- * Club domestic league appearances and goals as of 1 November 2026

Alin Iustin Popescu (born 1 September 1993) is a Romanian professional footballer who plays as a goalkeeper for Liga II club CSM Reșița.

== Honours ==
Dinamo București

- Cupa Ligii: 2016–17

Chindia Târgoviște

- Liga II: 2018–19
