= Daniel Sandu =

Romanian footballer (born 2007)

Personal information
- Date of birth: 28 June 2007 (age 19)
- Place of birth: Brașov, Romania
- Height: 1.80 m (5 ft 11 in)
- Position: Right winger

Team information
- Current team: Argeș Pitești
- Number: 18

Youth career
- 2014–2022: Kids Tâmpa Brașov
- 2022–2024: Sepsi OSK

Senior career*
Years	Team	Apps	(Gls)
2024–2025	Sepsi OSK	0	(0)
2024–2025	→ Metaloglobus București (loan)	6	(0)
2025–2026	Oțelul Galați	16	(0)
2026–	Argeș Pitești	0	(0)
- * Club domestic league appearances and goals as of 18 June 2026

Daniel Sandu (born 28 June 2007) is a Romanian professional footballer who plays as a right winger for Liga I club Argeș Pitești.

== Career statistics ==
As of 28 October 2026

Appearances and goals by club, season and competition
Club	Season	League			Cupa României		Europe		Other		Total	
Club	Season	Division	Apps	Goals	Apps	Goals	Apps	Goals	Apps	Goals	Apps	Goals
Metaloglobus București (loan)	2024–25	Liga II	6	0	—		—		0	0	6	0
Oțelul Galați	2025–26	Liga I	16	0	1	0	—		—		17	0
Argeș Pitești	2026–27	Liga I	0	0	1	0	—		—		1	0
Career total			22	0	2	0	—		0	0	24	0
