= Dan Neicu =

Romanian footballer

Personal information
- Full name: Dan Emilian Neicu
- Date of birth: 16 September 2002 (age 24)
- Place of birth: Galați, Romania
- Height: 1.88 m (6 ft 2 in)
- Position: Centre-back

Team information
- Current team: Oțelul Galați
- Number: 16

Youth career
- 2011–2015: Gheorghe Hagi Academy
- 2017–2018: Stuttgarter Kickers
- 2018–2019: Waldhof Mannheim
- 2020–2021: SGV Freiberg

Senior career*
Years	Team	Apps	(Gls)
2021–2022	Mauerwerk	8	(1)
2022	1. FC Bruchsal	16	(0)
2022–2023	Rot Weiss Ahlen	4	(0)
2023	Weiche Flensburg 08	5	(0)
2024–2025	TSV Essingen	8	(0)
2025	Nöttingen	12	(0)
2025–	Oțelul Galați	8	(0)
- * Club domestic league appearances and goals as of 28 August 2026

Dan Emilian Neicu (born 16 September 2002) is a Romanian professional footballer who plays as a centre-back for Liga I club Oțelul Galați.

== Career ==
Dan Neicu began his footballing journey at the age of nine at the academy of Romanian football legend Gheorghe Hagi. He left for Germany at the age of 14, where he played for Stuttgarter Kickers, Waldhof Mannheim and SGV Freiberg during his youth career.

In 2021, he signed his first professional contract with Mauerwerk.

In July 2025, he moved to Liga I club Oțelul Galați, signing a two-year contract.

Dan Neicu is the older brother of Cristian Neicu, who is also a footballer and plays for Otelul Galaţi.
