= Matei Frunză =

Romanian footballer (born 2006)

Personal information
- Date of birth: 12 March 2006 (age 20)
- Place of birth: Bucharest, Romania
- Height: 1.85 m (6 ft 1 in)
- Position: Defensive midfielder

Team information
- Current team: Oțelul Galați
- Number: 30

Youth career
- 2016–2020: Luceafărul Galați
- 2020–2022: Sport Team București
- 2022–2024: Rapid București

Senior career*
Years	Team	Apps	(Gls)
2024–2025	Rapid București	0	(0)
2024–2025	→ Unirea Braniștea (loan)		
2025–	Oțelul Galați	15	(0)
2026	→ Cetatea Suceava (loan)		
- * Club domestic league appearances and goals as of 25 October 2026

Matei Frunză (born 12 March 2006) is a Romanian professional footballer who plays as a defensive midfielder for Liga I club Oțelul Galați.

== Personal life ==
Matei's father, Sorin, was also footballer.

== Honours ==
Unirea Braniștea

- Liga III: 2024–25

Cetatea Suceava

- Liga III: 2025–26
