= Luan Campos =

Brazilian footballer (born 2002)

Personal information
- Full name: Luan de Campos Cristiano da Silva
- Date of birth: 19 March 2002 (age 24)
- Place of birth: Marília, Brazil
- Height: 1.78 m (5 ft 10 in)
- Position: Winger

Team information
- Current team: Hapoel Ramat Gan
- Number: 99

Youth career
- –2019: Marília
- 2019–2022: Palmeiras
- 2022: América Mineiro

Senior career*
| Years | Team | Apps | (Gls) |
| 2023–2025 | América Mineiro | 1 | (0) |
| 2023–2024 | → Portimonense (loan) | 16 | (1) |
| 2024–2025 | → Veres Rivne (loan) | 26 | (5) |
| 2025 | Sivasspor | 10 | (1) |
| 2026 | Oțelul Galați | 10 | (1) |
| 2026– | Hapoel Ramat Gan | 0 | (0) |
- * Club domestic league appearances and goals as of 16 July 2026

Luan de Campos Cristiano da Silva (born 19 March 2002), better known as Luan Campos or Luan, is a Brazilian professional footballer who plays as a winger for Israeli Premier League club Hapoel Ramat Gan.

== Club career ==
=== Marília ===
Originally from Marília, in the midwestern region of the state of São Paulo, Luan Campos began his football career with his hometown team, Marília Atlético Clube.

=== Palmeiras ===
On 1 July 2019, the player transferred to Palmeiras. He played 19 games and scored three goals for Palmeiras' under-20 team. With that team, he won the São Paulo state championship in that category.

=== América Mineiro ===
Due to competition for a starting position, the striker left São Paulo for Belo Horizonte and signed with América Mineiro on 1 April 2022.

=== Portimonense ===
On 18 August 2023, he was loaned by América Mineiro to Portimonense, which currently plays in the Liga Portugal 2, the second division of Portuguese football, with an option to buy. At the end of the season, after scoring one goal in 19 appearances, the Portuguese club did not activate the purchase clause.

=== NK Veres Rivne ===
Later, he also played on loan for NK Veres Rivne in the Ukrainian Premier League, where he played 29 games, scoring 7 goals and providing a decisive assist.

=== Sivasspor ===
In August 2025, Campos signed with Sivasspor in the second tier of the Turkish football league system, where he scored 1 goal and provided 1 assist in 11 official matches. He unilaterally terminated his contract with the Turkish team on 25 November 2025, claiming non-payment of two salaries and returned to Brazil. The Turkish club announced it would pursue legal action against the player for terminating the contract through an illegal notification from someone who is not his legal representative.

=== Oțelul Galați ===
On 12 January 2026, the player moved to Oțelul Galați from Liga I, signing a two-and-a-half-year contract.

== Honours ==
América Mineiro

- Campeonato Mineiro runner-up: 2023
