= Giannis Christopoulos (footballer, born 2000) =

Greek footballer

Personal information
- Full name: Ioannis Christopoulos
- Date of birth: 22 June 2000 (age 26)
- Place of birth: Patras, Greece
- Height: 1.91 m (6 ft 3 in)
- Position: Centre-back

Team information
- Current team: Oțelul Galați
- Number: 3

Youth career
- –2014: Doxa Paralias
- 2014–2020: Asteras Tripolis

Senior career*
Years	Team	Apps	(Gls)
2019–2024	Asteras Tripolis	39	(1)
2022–2023	→ Slaven Belupo (loan)	11	(0)
2024–2026	OFI	18	(0)
2026–	Oțelul Galați	11	(0)

International career
2018	Greece U19	3	(0)
2021–2022	Greece U21	8	(1)
- * Club domestic league appearances and goals as of 1 November 2026

Giannis Christopoulos (Greek: Γιάννης Χριστόπουλος; born 22 June 2000) is a Greek professional footballer who plays as a centre-back for Liga I club Oțelul Galați.

== Career ==
The 20-year-old defender, who is a product of Asteras Tripolis' academies, had 10 appearances with the club in the 2020–21 season, and is expected to solve his contract. According to reports from Belgium, Beerschot could be the next club in his career, as the Greek central defender is expected to replace Denis Prychynenko who will leave the club.

On 5 July 2021, Asteras Tripolis announced the extension of his contract until 2024.

On 19 June 2026, the player moved to Oțelul Galați from Liga I, signing a two-year contract.

== Career statistics ==
=== Club ===
As of 1 November 2026

Club	Season	League			National Cup (Note: Includes Greek Cup, Croatian Cup)		Europe		Other		Total	
Club	Season	Division	Apps	Goals	Apps	Goals	Apps	Goals	Apps	Goals	Apps	Goals
Asteras Tripolis	2018–19	Super League Greece	2	0	1	0	1 (Note: Appearances in UEFA Europa League)	0	—		4	0
Asteras Tripolis	2019–20	Super League Greece	1	0	0	0	—		—		1	0
Asteras Tripolis	2020–21	Super League Greece	10	0	1	0	—		—		11	0
Asteras Tripolis	2021–22	Super League Greece	16	1	1	0	—		—		17	1
Asteras Tripolis	2022–23	Super League Greece	0	0	—		—		—		0	0
Asteras Tripolis	2023–24	Super League Greece	10	0	1	0	—		—		11	0
Asteras Tripolis	Total		39	1	4	0	1	0	—		44	1
Slaven Belupo (loan)	2022–23	HNL	11	0	2	0	—		—		13	0
OFI	2024–25	Super League Greece	11	0	3	0	—		—		14	0
OFI	2025–26	Super League Greece	7	0	2	0	—		0	0	9	0
OFI	Total		18	0	5	0	—		0	0	23	0
Oțelul Galați	2026–27	Liga I	11	0	0	0	—		—		11	0
Career total			79	1	11	0	1	0	0	0	91	1

== Honours ==
OFI

- Greek Cup: 2025–26
