= Ștefan Bană =

Romanian footballer

Personal information
- Full name: Ștefan Daniel Bană
- Date of birth: 29 October 2004 (age 22)
- Place of birth: Băilești, Romania
- Height: 1.77 m (5 ft 10 in)
- Position: Winger

Team information
- Current team: Al Kharaitiyat
- Number: 10

Youth career
- 2013–2014: Școala de Fotbal Gheorghe Popescu
- 2014–2025: Universitatea Craiova

Senior career*
Years	Team	Apps	(Gls)
2024–2026	Universitatea Craiova	26	(2)
2025–2026	→ Oțelul Galați (loan)	22	(4)
2026–	Al Kharaitiyat	2	(0)

International career^{‡}
2024–2025	Romania U20	8	(0)
2026	Romania U21	2	(0)
- * Club domestic league appearances and goals as of 8 September 2026 ‡ National team caps and goals as of 31 March 2026

Ștefan Daniel Bană (born 29 October 2004) is a Romanian professional footballer who plays as a winger for Qatar Stars League 2 club Al Kharaitiyat.

== Personal life ==
His father was also a footballer who played at Divizia B level for CSM Reșița.

== Career statistics ==
As of 8 September 2026

Appearances and goals by club, season and competition
Club	Season	League			Cupa României		Europe		Other		Total	
Club	Season	Division	Apps	Goals	Apps	Goals	Apps	Goals	Apps	Goals	Apps	Goals
Universitatea Craiova	2021–22	Liga I	—		1	0	—		—		1	0
Universitatea Craiova	2023–24	Liga I	3	1	0	0	—		1 (Note: Appearance in Liga I European play-offs)	0	4	1
Universitatea Craiova	2024–25	Liga I	23	1	4	1	0	0	—		27	2
Universitatea Craiova	Total		26	2	5	1	0	0	1	0	32	3
Oțelul Galați (loan)	2025–26	Liga I	22	4	1	0	—		—		23	4
Al Kharaitiyat	2026–27	Qatar Stars League 2	2	0	0	0	—		—		2	0
Career total			50	6	6	1	0	0	1	0	57	7
