= Dorinel Oancea =

Romanian footballer

Personal information
- Full name: Gabriel Dorinel Oancea
- Date of birth: 2 April 1997 (age 29)
- Place of birth: Câmpulung, Romania
- Height: 1.76 m (5 ft 9 in)
- Position: Right back

Team information
- Current team: Argeş Piteşti
- Number: 26

Youth career
- –2015: Muscelul Câmpulung

Senior career*
| Years | Team | Apps | (Gls) |
| 2015–2016 | Muscelul Câmpulung | 17 | (3) |
| 2016–2020 | Argeș Pitești | 76 | (4) |
| 2020–2023 | Mioveni | 77 | (1) |
| 2023–2025 | Universitatea Cluj | 65 | (1) |
| 2025– | Argeș Pitești | 43 | (1) |
- * Club domestic league appearances and goals as of 6 November 2026

Gabriel Dorinel Oancea (born 2 April 1997) is a Romanian professional footballer who plays as a right back for Liga I club Argeș Pitești.

== Career statistics ==
=== Club ===
As of match played 6 November 2026

| Club | Season | League | | | Cupa României | | Europe | | Other | | Total | |
| Club | Season | Division | Apps | Goals | Apps | Goals | Apps | Goals | Apps | Goals | Apps | Goals |
|---|---|---|---|---|---|---|---|---|---|---|---|---|
| Muscelul Câmpulung | 2015–16 | Liga III | 17 | 3 | ? | ? | – | | – | | 17 | 3 |
| Argeș Pitești | 2016–17 | Liga III | 28 | 2 | ? | ? | – | | – | | 28 | 2 |
| Argeș Pitești | 2017–18 | Liga II | 23 | 0 | 0 | 0 | – | | – | | 23 | 0 |
| Argeș Pitești | 2018–19 | Liga II | 22 | 2 | 0 | 0 | – | | – | | 22 | 2 |
| Argeș Pitești | 2019–20 | Liga II | 3 | 0 | 0 | 0 | – | | – | | 23 | 0 |
| Argeș Pitești | 2020–21 | Liga I | 0 | 0 | – | | – | | – | | 0 | 0 |
| Argeș Pitești | Total | | 76 | 4 | 0 | 0 | – | | – | | 76 | 4 |
| Mioveni | 2020–21 | Liga II | 25 | 0 | 1 | 0 | – | | 2 (Note: Appearances in Liga I promotion/relegation play-offs) | 0 | 28 | 0 |
| Mioveni | 2021–22 | Liga I | 33 | 1 | 1 | 0 | – | | – | | 34 | 1 |
| Mioveni | 2022–23 | Liga I | 19 | 0 | 4 | 0 | – | | – | | 23 | 0 |
| Mioveni | Total | | 77 | 1 | 6 | 0 | – | | 2 | 0 | 85 | 1 |
| Universitatea Cluj | 2022–23 | Liga I | 17 | 0 | 2 | 0 | – | | – | | 19 | 0 |
| Universitatea Cluj | 2023–24 | Liga I | 22 | 1 | 5 | 0 | – | | 2 (Note: Appearances in Liga I European play-offs) | 0 | 29 | 1 |
| Universitatea Cluj | 2024–25 | Liga I | 26 | 0 | 1 | 0 | – | | – | | 27 | 0 |
| Universitatea Cluj | Total | | 65 | 1 | 8 | 0 | – | | 2 | 0 | 75 | 1 |
| Argeș Pitești | 2025–26 | Liga I | 31 | 0 | 5 | 0 | – | | – | | 36 | 0 |
| Argeș Pitești | 2026–27 | Liga I | 12 | 1 | 1 | 0 | – | | – | | 13 | 1 |
| Argeș Pitești | Total | | 43 | 1 | 6 | 0 | – | | – | | 49 | 1 |
| Career total | | | 278 | 10 | 20 | 0 | – | | 4 | 0 | 302 | 10 |

== Honours ==
SCM Pitești

- Liga III: 2016–17

Universitatea Cluj

- Cupa României runner-up: 2022–23
