= Din Alomerovikj =

North Macedonian footballer (born 1997)

Personal information
- Date of birth: 29 June 1997 (age 29)
- Place of birth: Skopje, Macedonia
- Height: 1.74 m (5 ft 9 in)
- Position: Left-back

Team information
- Current team: UTA Arad
- Number: 3

Youth career
- –2015: Vardar

Senior career*
Years	Team	Apps	(Gls)
2015–2016	Vardar	0	(0)
2015–2016	→ Euromilk Gorno Lisiče (loan)		
2016–2017	Makedonija G.P.	28	(3)
2017–2018	Fuenlabrada B		
2018–2019	Celta Vigo B	1	(0)
2019	Salamanca	14	(0)
2019–2020	La Nucía	5	(0)
2020	Rabotnicki	3	(0)
2020–2021	Linense	22	(1)
2021–2025	Rabotnicki	117	(1)
2025–	UTA Arad	44	(2)

International career^{‡}
2013	Macedonia U17	3	(1)
2014–2015	Macedonia U18	4	(0)
2014–2015	Macedonia U19	5	(1)
2016–2018	Macedonia U21	4	(0)
2026–	North Macedonia	3	(0)
- * Club domestic league appearances and goals as of 6 November 2026 ‡ National team caps and goals as of 30 September 2026

Din Alomerovikj (Macedonian: Дин Aлoмepoвиќ; Bosnian: Din Alomerović; born 29 June 1997) is a Macedonian professional footballer who plays as a left-back for Liga I club UTA Arad and the North Macedonia national team..

== International career ==
Alomerovikj was called up to the North Macedonia national team for a set of friendlies in June 2026.

== Career statistics ==
=== Club ===
As of match played 6 November 2026

Appearances and goals by club, season and competition
Club	Season	League			National cup (Note: Includes Macedonian Cup, Copa del Rey, Cupa României)		Europe		Other		Total	
Club	Season	Division	Apps	Goals	Apps	Goals	Apps	Goals	Apps	Goals	Apps	Goals
Euromilk Gorno Lisiče (loan)	2015–16	2. MFL	?	?	?	?	—		—		?	?
Makedonija G.P.	2016–17	1. MFL	28	3	1	0	—		—		29	3
Fuenlabrada B	2017–18	Primera Aficionados	?	?	—		—		—		?	?
Celta Vigo B	2017–18	Segunda División B	0	0	—		—		—		0	0
Celta Vigo B	2018–19	Segunda División B	1	0	—		—		—		1	0
Celta Vigo B	Total		1	0	—		—		—		1	0
Salamanca	2018–19	Segunda División B	14	0	—		—		—		14	0
La Nucía	2019–20	Segunda División B	5	0	0	0	—		—		5	0
Rabotnicki	2019–20	1. MFL	3	0	—		—		—		3	0
Linense	2020–21	Segunda División B	22	1	1	0	—		—		23	1
Rabotnicki	2021–22	1. MFL	27	0	2	1	—		—		29	1
Rabotnicki	2022–23	1. MFL	28	0	0	0	—		—		28	0
Rabotnicki	2023–24	1. MFL	32	0	1	0	—		—		33	0
Rabotnicki	2024–25	1. MFL	30	1	1	0	—		—		31	1
Rabotnicki	Total		117	1	4	1	—		—		121	2
UTA Arad	2025–26	Liga I	33	2	3	1	—		—		36	3
UTA Arad	2026–27	Liga I	11	0	2	0	—		—		13	0
UTA Arad	Total		44	2	5	1	—		—		49	3
Career total			234	7	11	2	—		—		245	9

=== International ===
As of match played 29 September 2026

Appearances and goals by national team and year
National team	Year	Apps	Goals
North Macedonia	2026	3	0
Total		3	0
