= Milen Zhelev =

Bulgarian footballer

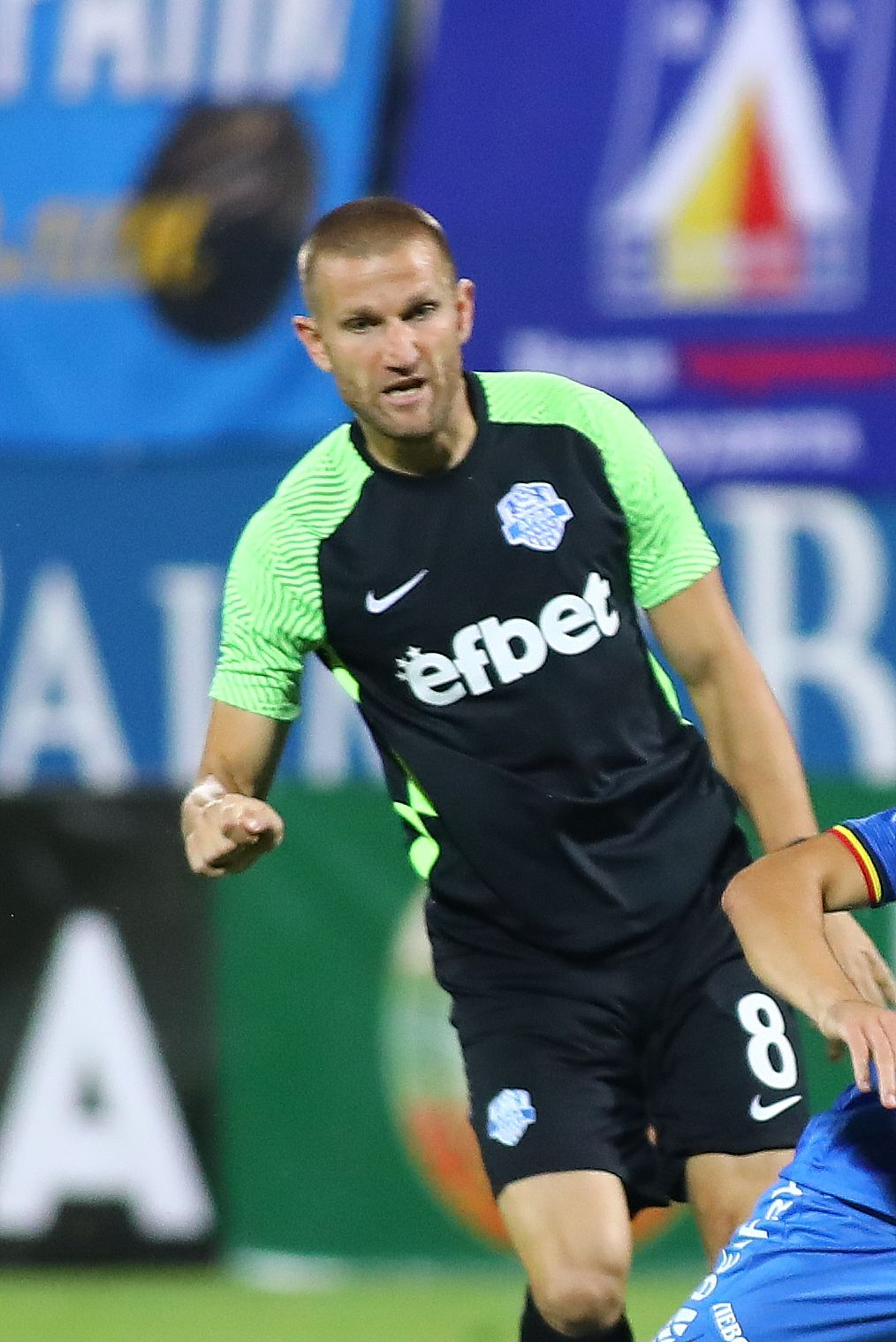

Personal information
- Full name: Milen Zhivkov Zhelev
- Date of birth: 15 July 1993 (age 33)
- Place of birth: Stara Zagora, Bulgaria
- Height: 1.80 m (5 ft 11 in)
- Position: Right back

Team information
- Current team: Oțelul Galați
- Number: 2

Youth career
- 2002–2008: Trayana Stara Zagora
- 2008–2011: Slavia Sofia

Senior career*
Years	Team	Apps	(Gls)
2011–2012	Slavia Sofia	0	(0)
2011	→ Akademik Sofia (loan)	4	(0)
2012	Vidima-Rakovski	10	(0)
2013–2014	Zagorets	41	(7)
2015	Botev Galabovo	13	(1)
2015–2017	Lokomotiv GO	59	(3)
2017–2020	Beroe Stara Zagora	75	(1)
2020–2023	Arda Kardzhali	84	(4)
2023–	Oțelul Galați	96	(1)
- * Club domestic league appearances and goals as of 14 September 2026

Milen Zhivkov Zhelev (Bulgarian: Милен Живков Желев; born 15 July 1993) is a Bulgarian professional footballer who currently plays as a right back for Liga I club Oțelul Galați.

== Career ==
On 21 June 2017, Zhelev signed with Beroe.

== International career ==
In November 2016, Zhelev received his first call-up to the senior Bulgaria squad for a match against Belarus, but did not make the final squad for the game.

== Honours ==
Arda Kardzhali

- Bulgarian Cup runner-up: 2020–21

Oțelul Galați

- Cupa României runner-up: 2023–24
