= Cristian Neicu =

Romanian footballer

Personal information
- Full name: Dan Cristian Neicu
- Date of birth: 3 November 2004 (age 21)
- Place of birth: Galați, România
- Height: 1.88 m (6 ft 2 in)
- Position: Forward

Team information
- Current team: Oțelul Galați
- Number: 15

Youth career
- 2012–2016: Gheorghe Hagi Academy
- 2017–2020: FSV Waiblingen
- 2020–2021: SGV Freiberg
- 2021–2022: SpVgg Neckarelz
- 2022–2023: VfR Aalen

Senior career*
Years	Team	Apps	(Gls)
2023–2024	Komet Arsten	26	(9)
2024–2025	FC Oberneuland	25	(7)
2025–	Oțelul Galați	11	(1)
- * Club domestic league appearances and goals as of 16 October 2026

Dan Cristian Neicu (born 3 November 2004) is a Romanian professional footballer who plays as a forward for Liga I club Oțelul Galați.

== Career ==
Cristian Neicu began learning the secrets of football at Gheorghe Hagi's academy in 2012, when he was eight years old. He continued his junior career in Germany with FSV Waiblingen, SGV Freiberg, SpVgg Neckarelz and VfR Aalen from 2016 onwards.

In 2023, he signed his first senior contract with Komet Arsten.

In July 2025, Cristian he moved to Liga I club Oțelul Galați, signing a two-year contract alongside his older brother, Dan Neicu.
