= Pedro Nuno =

Portuguese footballer

Personal information
- Full name: Pedro Nuno Fernandes Ferreira
- Date of birth: 13 January 1995 (age 31)
- Place of birth: Buarcos, Portugal
- Height: 1.74 m (5 ft 9 in)
- Position: Attacking midfielder

Team information
- Current team: Oțelul Galați
- Number: 27

Youth career
- 2003–2004: Buarcos
- 2004–2010: Naval
- 2010–2012: Benfica
- 2012–2014: Académica

Senior career*
Years	Team	Apps	(Gls)
2014–2016	Académica	24	(5)
2016–2018	Benfica	0	(0)
2016–2018	→ Tondela (loan)	45	(4)
2018–2021	Moreirense	62	(9)
2021–2022	Belenenses SAD	30	(2)
2022–2023	Adanaspor	16	(1)
2023–2024	Sabail	34	(10)
2024–2025	Korona Kielce	29	(5)
2025–	Oțelul Galați	37	(9)
- * Club domestic league appearances and goals as of 1 November 2026

Pedro Nuno Fernandes Ferreira (born 13 January 1995), known as Pedro Nuno, is a Portuguese professional footballer who plays as an attacking midfielder for Liga I club Oțelul Galați.

== Club career ==
Born in Buarcos, Figueira da Foz, Pedro Nuno finished his youth spell with local Académica de Coimbra, joining the club at the age of 17. On 16 August 2014, he made his first-team – and Primeira Liga – debut, coming on as a 90th-minute substitute for Richard Ofori in a 1–1 home draw against Sporting CP. He scored his first goal the following 23 May 2015 in the last matchday, a 2–4 loss to Vitória S.C. also at the Estádio Cidade de Coimbra.

Pedro Nuno netted four times in only 12 games in the 2015–16 season, but his team returned to the Segunda Liga after a 14-year stay. On 28 November 2016, he signed a four-and-a-half-year contract with defending champions S.L. Benfica, moving to C.D. Tondela on loan nine days later.

On 9 July 2018, Pedro Nuno cut ties with the Estádio da Luz-based club and joined Moreirense F.C. for three seasons. He scored five goals in his debut campaign, helping the side to finish sixth and narrowly miss out on qualification for the UEFA Europa League.

Pedro Nuno spent the vast majority of 2020–21 on the sidelines, after rupturing the ligaments in his right knee. In June 2021, he agreed to a three-year deal at B-SAD.

On 23 June 2022, Pedro Nuno was due to sign for Maccabi Bnei Reineh F.C. in the Israeli Premier League, but he was released one month later. In August, he moved to the Turkish TFF First League on a one-year contract at Adanaspor.

On 4 July 2023, Pedro Nuno joined Azerbaijan Premier League club Sabail FK on a one-year contract. In July 2024, he signed a one-year deal with Korona Kielce in the Polish Ekstraklasa with a one-year extension option, being released at the end of the season.

Pedro Nuno moved to Liga I team ASC Oțelul Galați on 21 August 2025, agreeing to a two-year contract.

== Honours ==
Individual

- Primeira Liga Goal of the Month: February 2020
