= Kazu (footballer, born 2000) =

Brazilian footballer

Personal information
- Full name: Christian Kendji Wagatsuma Ferreira
- Date of birth: 18 March 2000 (age 26)
- Place of birth: Maringá, Brazil
- Height: 1.76 m (5 ft 9 in)
- Position: Left-back

Team information
- Current team: Oțelul Galați
- Number: 88

Youth career
- 2014–2020: Coritiba
- 2019: → Grêmio (loan)

Senior career*
| Years | Team | Apps | (Gls) |
| 2020–2022 | Coritiba | 0 | (0) |
| 2021 | → North Texas SC (loan) | 27 | (6) |
| 2022 | → Paraná (loan) | 0 | (0) |
| 2022–2024 | Oliveirense | 35 | (1) |
| 2024–2025 | Gil Vicente | 14 | (0) |
| 2025– | Oțelul Galați | 25 | (1) |

International career
| 2016–2017 | Brazil U17 | 4 | (0) |
Medal record
Representing Brazil
Men's football
South American U-17 Championship
| Winner | 2017 Chile |
- * Club domestic league appearances and goals as of 1 November 2026

Christian Kendji Wagatsuma Ferreira (born 18 March 2000), commonly known as Kazu, is a Brazilian professional footballer who plays as a left-back for Liga I club Oțelul Galați.

== Career ==
On 31 January 2024, Kazu left Liga Portugal 2 club Oliveirense and signed a two-and-a-half-year contract with Primeira Liga club Gil Vicente.

In June 2025, the player moved to Oțelul Galați from Liga I, signing a two-year contract.

== Personal life ==
Kazu is of Japanese descent with his great grandparents hailing from Osaka.

== Honours ==
Brazil U17

- South American U-17 Championship: 2017
