= 2022–23 ASC Oțelul Galați season =

ASC Oțelul Galați
2022–23 season
- Chairman: Cristian Munteanu
- Manager: Dorinel Munteanu
- Liga II: 3rd (Promoted)
- Cupa României: Group Stage
- Top goalscorer: League: Cârjan (6); All: Cârjan (6)

The 2022–23 season is Oțelul Galați's first season back in the Liga II since the 2015–16 season. In addition to the Liga II, Oțelul will participate in this season's edition of Cupa României.

== Overview ==
Oțelul ended the previous season by winning promotion to the Liga II in a final tournament, playing against Foresta and Dante Botoşani. Following the match 2nd leg win against Dante, the players went on holiday. The return to training took place in late June, with a friendly against Galați county Unirea Braniștea that took place on the 1st of July.

== Players ==
=== Transfers ===
==== In ====
No.	Pos.	Nat.	Name	Age	EU	Moving from	Type	Transfer window	Ends	Transfer fee	Source
99	GK	(Romania)	Rareș Antonio Pop	23	EU	Chindia Târgoviște	Transfer	Summer	2023	Undisclosed	
9	ST	(Sweden)	Berisha	26	EU	Sliema Wanderers (Malta)	Transfer	Summer	Undisclosed	Undisclosed	
–	RW	(Romania)	Robert Băceanu	17	EU	Farul II	Loan in	Summer	2023	Undisclosed	
–	LB	(France) (Democratic Republic of the Congo)	Mabussi	25	EU		Transfer	Summer	Undisclosed	Free	
19	LW	(Romania)	Răzvan Gorovei	28	EU	Dante Botoșani	Transfer	Summer	Undisclosed	Undisclosed	
20	LW	(Netherlands)	Kip	30	EU		Transfer	Summer	Undisclosed	Free	
17	LW	(Romania)	Mitoi	17	EU	FC Argeș	Transfer	Summer	Undisclosed	Undisclosed	
21	LW	(Romania)	Laurențiu Maxim	17	EU	Viitorul Cluj	Transfer	Summer	Undisclosed	Undisclosed	
6	CM	(Serbia)	Marković	28	Non-EU	Ruch Chorzów (Poland)	Transfer	Summer	Undisclosed	Undisclosed	
–	CB	(Colombia)	Maykel Reyes Villarreal	24	Non-EU	Walter Ferretti (Nicaragua)	Transfer	Summer	Undisclosed	Undisclosed	
4	CB	(Croatia)	Antonio Azinovic	30	EU	Bregalnica Štip (North Macedonia)	Transfer	Summer	Undisclosed	Undisclosed	
71	ST	(Romania)	David Ilie	17	EU	Petrolul Ploiești	Transfer	Summer	Undisclosed	Undisclosed	
20	CF	(Ukraine)	Bokhashvili	29	Non-EU	Nam Dinh (Vietnam)	Transfer	Summer	Undisclosed	Free	
22	LB	(Romania)	Panait	25	EU	FC Brașov	Transfer	Summer	Undisclosed	Undisclosed	
2	RB	(Romania)	Ionuț Ilieș	18	EU	U Cluj	Transfer	Summer	2023	Undisclosed	
77	RW	(Romania)	Ursu	28	EU	CSC 1599 Șelimbăr	Transfer	Winter	Undisclosed	Free	
20	AM	(Romania)	Antonio Cruceru	26	EU	AFC Unirea Slobozia	Transfer	Winter	2024	Free	
31	DM	(Croatia)	Živulić	30	EU	NK Tabor Sežana	Transfer	Winter	2024	Free	
9	CF	(Romania)	Andreas Chirițoiu	19	EU	FCSB II	Loan-in	Winter	2023	Free	
27	RW	(Romania)	Cristian Ciobanu	28	EU		Free	Winter	2023	Free	
6	DM	(Romania)	Rareș Scocîlcă	18	EU	FC Universitatea Cluj	Loan-in	Winter	2023	Free	
29	ST	(Bulgaria)	Dimitrov	26	EU	Lokomotiv Sofia	Transfer	Winter	2024	Undisclosed	
	ST	(Nigeria)	Fatai	33	EU	Turan	Transfer	Winter	Undisclosed	Undisclosed	

==== Out ====
No.	Pos.	Nat.	Name	Age	EU	Moving to	Type	Transfer window	Transfer fee	Source
9	CF	(England)	Jack Serrant-Green	28	Non-EU		Released	Summer	–	
4	CB	(Romania)	Laurențiu Hagiu	19	EU		Released	Summer	–	
2	RB	(Romania)	Alberto Țica	19	EU	U Cluj	Loan end	Summer	–	
21	RW	(Romania)	Marius Savu	18	EU	Colțea Brașov	Loan end	Summer	–	
29	AM	(Romania)	Valentin Oniciu	19	EU	CSM Galați	Loan end	Summer	–	
1	GK	(Romania)	Gabriel Ursu	20	EU	Unirea Braniștea	Loan out	Summer	–	
6	CM	(Romania)	Marc Cireș	18	EU	Unirea Braniștea	Loan out	Summer	–	
	RW	(Romania)	Robert Băceanu	17	EU	Farul II	Loan end	Summer	–	
	LB	(France) (Democratic Republic of the Congo)	Mabussi	25	EU		Released	Summer	–	
	CB	(Colombia)	Maykel Reyes Villarreal	24	Non-EU		Released	Summer	–	
71	ST	(Romania)	David Ilie	18	EU		Released	Summer	–	
20	CF	(Ukraine)	Bokhashvili	29	Non-EU		Released	Winter		
9	ST	(Sweden)	Berisha	26	EU		Released	Winter		
5	DM	(Romania)	Denis Cireș	21	EU	Unirea Braniștea	Loan-out	Winter	Free	
4	CB	(Croatia)	Antonio Azinovic	30	EU		Released	Winter		
6	CM	(Serbia)	Marković	28	EU		Released	Winter		

EU = if holds or not a European Union passport; Country: when 2 flags, 1st flag = country that plays for internationally, 2nd flag = country of birth; N = number on jersey; P = Position (for position name, pause mouse pointer on abbreviation); Name = Name on jersey (for more extensive name, pause mouse pointer on name); Age = age on the day of the signing; Moving from = only indicate the club the player was playing before start playing for this club in this season, for the type of the moving see Status column; Moving to = only indicates the club the player is going to play next, for the type of the moving see Status column; Ends = when the player's current contract ends; n/a = Not applicable.

== Player statistics ==
=== Squad statistics ===
				Total			Liga II		Cupa României	
No.	Pos.	Nat.	Name	Sts	App	Gls	App	Gls	App	Gls
0	ST	(Nigeria)	Fatai	10	12	3	12	3		
2	RM	(Romania)	Ionuț Ilieș	2	2				2	
3	LB	(Romania)	Gabriel Nedelea	18	18		18			
4	CB	(Croatia)	Antonio Azinović	15	18	1	14	1	4	
5	DM	(Romania)	Denis Cires	3	10		5		5	
6	DM	(Romania)	Rareș Scocîlcă	5	8		8			
7	CF	(Romania)	Cârjan	16	26	6	25	6	1	
8	DM	(Romania)	Neagu	23	27	2	25	2	2	
9	CF	(Romania)	Andreas Chirițoiu		2		2			
11	RM	(Romania)	Alin Nica	11	26	1	22	1	4	
13	GK	(Romania)	Dur-Bozoancă	26	26		24		2	
14	RB	(Romania)	Andrei Rus	28	31		26		5	
15	CB	(Burkina Faso)	Yabré	31	31		29		2	
16	LB	(Romania)	Costin Ghiocel	11	11		10		1	
17	CM	(Romania)	Mitoi	15	28	2	25	1	3	1
18	RB	(Romania)	Sțefan Farcaș	6	10		6		4	
19	LW	(Romania)	Răzvan Gorovei	23	27	3	23	3	4	
20	CM	(Romania)	Antonio Cruceru	1	5		5			
21	RW	(Romania)	Laurențiu Maxim	12	27	1	24	1	3	
22	LB	(Romania)	Panait	16	23		18		5	
23	DM	(Moldova)	Jardan	20	28	2	25	2	3	
24	AM	(Netherlands)	Kip		3		1		2	
25	CM	(Romania)	Denis Bordun		1		1			
26	AM	(Romania)	Mihai Adăscăliței	3	22		17		5	
27	CM	(Romania)	Ciobanu		2		2			
30	LW	(Italy)	Cisotti	28	29	5	26	5	3	
31	DM	(Croatia)	Živulić	5	12		12			
33	CB	(Romania)	Sîrghi	9	10		6		4	
77	RW	(Romania)	Ursu	12	12	3	12	3		
99	GK	(Romania)	Rareș Pop	8	9		6		3	

Last updated: 29 July 2023
Source: official website
Ordered by player name
0 shown as blank

=== Start formations ===
Qnt	Formation	Match(es)
29	4-3-3	
1	4-1-4-1	
1	4-2-3-1	

Last updated: 29 July 2023
Source: Match reports in Matches
Only competitive matches.

== Club ==
=== Coaching staff ===
Position	Staff
Head coach	(Romania) Dorinel Munteanu
Assistant coach 1	(Romania) Sorin Haraga
Assistant coach 2	(Romania) Catălin Ciorman
Fitness coach	(Romania) Constantin Crăciun
Goalkeepers coach	(Romania) Iulian Olteanu

Last updated: 11 June 2022
Source: ascotelul.ro

== Competitions ==
=== Overall ===
	Total	Home	Away
Games played	34	18	16
Games won	15	11	4
Games drawn	9	3	6
Games lost	10	4	6
Biggest win	3-0 vs. Metaloglobus	3-0 vs. Metaloglobus	3-1 vs. Dinamo
Biggest loss	0-3 vs. Dinamo	0-2 vs. Dinamo	0-3 vs. Dinamo
Clean sheets	13	9	4
Goals scored	34	21	13
Goals conceded	31	14	17
Goal difference	3	7	-4
Average GF per game	1	1.17	0.81
Average GA per game	0.91	0.78	1.06
Yellow cards	81	43	38
Red cards	2	1	1
Most appearances	(Romania) Andrei Rus (31)		
Most minutes played	(Burkina Faso) Yabré (2790)		
Top scorer	(Romania) Cârjan (6)		
Top assister	(Romania) Răzvan Gorovei (4)		
Points	54/102 (52.94%)	36/54 (66.67%)	18/48 (37.5%)
Winning rate	44.12%	61.11%	25%

Last updated: 29 July 2023
Source: Matches

=== Liga II ===
==== League table ====
Pos	Team	Pld	W	D	L	GF	GA	GD	Pts	Promotion or relegation
1	Steaua București	19	12	4	3	37	18	+19	40	Qualification for Promotion play-off
2	Politehnica Iași	19	12	4	3	30	14	+16	40	Qualification for Promotion play-off
3	Oțelul Galați	19	10	6	3	21	12	+9	36	Qualification for Promotion play-off
4	Unirea Dej	19	8	8	3	30	25	+5	32	Qualification for Promotion play-off
5	Gloria Buzău	19	8	7	4	27	21	+6	31	Qualification for Promotion play-off

Source: FRF (in Romanian)
Rules for classification: 1) Points; 2) Head-to-head points; 3) Head-to-head goal difference; 4) Head-to-head goals scored; 5)Goal difference; 6) Goals scored;

Pos	Team	Pld	W	D	L	GF	GA	GD	Pts	Promotion or qualification
1	Politehnica Iași (C, P)	10	5	5	0	20	8	+12	60	Promotion to Superliga
2	Steaua București	10	3	3	4	16	18	−2	52	Ineligible for promotion (Note: Steaua București is ineligible for promotion due to the club being owned by a governmental department/entity, all Liga I clubs are required to be privately owned.)
3	Oțelul Galați (P)	10	4	1	5	8	13	−5	49	Promotion to Superliga
4	Dinamo București (P)	10	4	3	3	16	12	+4	46	Qualification for play-offs
5	Gloria Buzău	10	2	5	3	9	11	−2	42	Qualification for play-offs
6	Unirea Dej	10	1	5	4	2	9	−7	40	

Source: FRF
Rules for classification: 1) Points; 2) Points in the regular season; 3) Head-to-head points; 4) Head-to-head goal difference; 5) Head-to-head goals scored; 6) Head-to-head away goals scored; 7) Goal difference (regular season + play off); 8) Goals scored (regular season + play off); 9) Play-off.
(C) Champions; (P) Promoted
Notes:

Pos	Team	Pld	W	D	L	GF	GA	GD	Pts	Qualification or relegation
1	Csíkszereda	6	4	1	1	12	6	+6	39	
2	1599 Șelimbăr	6	4	0	2	9	7	+2	36	
3	Unirea Slobozia	6	0	3	3	7	11	−4	34	
4	Slatina	6	2	1	3	2	5	−3	34	
5	Metaloglobus București (O)	6	3	2	1	12	6	+6	32	Qualification for the relegation play-offs
6	Minaur Baia Mare (R)	6	1	3	2	3	4	−1	22	Relegation to 2023–24 Liga III
7	Politehnica Timișoara (R)	6	2	0	4	5	11	−6	19	Relegation to 2023–24 Liga III

Source: FRF
Rules for classification: 1) Points; 2) Points in the regular season; 3) Head-to-head points; 4) Head-to-head goal difference; 5) Head-to-head goals scored; 6) Head-to-head away goals scored; 7) Goal difference (regular season + play out); 8) Goals scored (regular season + play out); 9) Play-off.
(O) Play-off winners; (R) Relegated

Pos	Team	Pld	W	D	L	GF	GA	GD	Pts	Qualification or relegation
1	FC Brașov (D, R)	6	5	1	0	23	5	+18	44	Dissolved and disqualified
2	Concordia Chiajna	6	3	1	2	8	6	+2	39	
3	Dumbrăvița	6	3	0	3	12	8	+4	33	
4	Viitorul Târgu Jiu	6	2	1	3	10	11	−1	32	
5	Progresul Spartac București (O)	6	4	0	2	15	7	+8	29	Qualification for the relegation play-offs
6	Unirea Constanța (D, R)	6	2	0	4	5	27	−22	18	Dissolved and disqualified
7	Ripensia Timișoara (R)	6	0	1	5	2	11	−9	17	Relegation to 2023–24 Liga III

Source: FRF
Rules for classification: 1) Points; 2) Points in the regular season; 3) Head-to-head points; 4) Head-to-head goal difference; 5) Head-to-head goals scored; 6) Head-to-head away goals scored; 7) Goal difference (regular season + play out); 8) Goals scored (regular season + play out); 9) Play-off.
(D) Disqualified; (O) Play-off winners; (R) Relegated

==== Results summary ====
Overall								Home						Away					
Pld	W	D	L	GF	GA	GD	Pts	W	D	L	GF	GA	GD	W	D	L	GF	GA	GD
29	14	7	8	29	25	+4	49	11	2	2	21	11	+10	3	5	6	8	14	−6

Last updated: 29 July 2023.
Source: Matches

==== Results by round ====
Round	1	2	3	4	5	6	7	8	9	10	11	12	13	14	15	16	17	18	19	20	21	22	23	24	25	26	27	28	29
Ground	H	A	H	A	H	A	H	H	A	H	A	H	A	H	A	H	A	H	A	H	H	A	H	A	A	A	H	A	H
Result	D	W	W	D	W	D	W	W	L	W	L	D	L	W	W	W	D	W	D	L	W	L	W	W	L	D	L	L	W
Position	10	5	3	5	2	6	1	1	3	3	3	4	7	7	4	3	3	3	3	3	3	3	3	3	3	3	3	3	3

Updated to match(es) played on 29 July 2023. Source: Matches
A = Away; H = Home; W = Win; D = Draw; L = Loss

==== Points by opponent ====
Team	Results				Points
Team	Regular		Playoff		Points
Team	Home	Away	Home	Away	Points
Dinamo București		3-1	0-2	0-3	3
Unirea Dej		0-2	1-0	1-0	6
Gloria Buzău	1-1		1-0	0-1	4
Poli Iași	0-0		1-2	0-2	1
Steaua București		0-1	3-2	1-1	4
Ripensia		1-0			3
Unirea Constanța	3-2				3
CSM Slatina		0-0			1
Metaloglobus	3-0				3
FC Brașov	2-1				3
Viitorul Târgu Jiu	2-1				3
Poli Timișoara	1-0				3
Concordia Chiajna	1-0				3
Minaur	1-0				3
Unirea Slobozia		0-1			0
1599 Șelimbăr		1-1			1
Progresul Spartac		0-0			1
Csíkszereda	1-0				3
Dumbrăvița		1-1			1

Source: SCOG

==== Matches ====
Kickoff times are in EET.

6 August 2022 Matchday 1	Oțelul Galați	0-0	Poli Iași	Galați
11:30	Gabriel Nedelea (yellow card) 30'; Alin Nica (yellow card) 87'	(Report)	Alexandru Anton (yellow card) 66'; Martac (yellow card) 81'; Vașvari (yellow card) 82'; Cristea (yellow card) 90+5'	Stadium: Oțelul; Attendance: 9,000; Referee: Cristian Moldoveanu

16 August 2022 Matchday 2	Dinamo București	1-3	Oțelul Galați	Clinceni
18:00	Buhăescu 45+2'; Bani (yellow card) 34'; Dudea (yellow card) 58'; Iglesias (yellow card) 82'; Țîră (yellow card) 90+4'	(Report)	Răzvan Gorovei 33', (yellow card) 66'; Laurențiu Maxim 56'; Cârjan 66', (yellow card) 63'; Jardan (yellow card) 46'; Andrei Rus (yellow card) 74'; Mihai Adăscăliței (yellow card) 28'	Stadium: Clinceni; Attendance: 3,500; Referee: Valentin Porumbel

21 August 2022 Matchday 3	Oțelul Galați	3-2	Unirea Constanța	Galați
12:30	Cârjan 29', 45+1'; Cisotti 49'; Răzvan Gorovei (yellow card) 90'; Mitoi (yellow card) 89'	(Report)	Ardelean 82', 86', (yellow card) 90+1'; Ianis Malama (yellow card) 90+2'	Stadium: Oțelul; Attendance: 7,000; Referee: Andrei Baciu

26 August 2022 Matchday 4	1599 Șelimbăr	1-1	Oțelul Galați	Râmnicu Vâlcea
16:30	Ursu 50'; Boboc (yellow card) 24'; Aleksander Mitrovic (yellow card) 45+3'	(Report)	Cisotti 37' (pen.); Jardan (yellow card) 28'; Răzvan Gorovei (yellow card) 52'; Cârjan (yellow card) 71'; Antonio Azinović (yellow card) 90+5'	Stadium: Municipal; Attendance: 323; Referee: Vlad Baban

3 September 2022 Matchday 5	Oțelul Galați	1-0	Poli Timișoara	Galați
11:30	Răzvan Gorovei 3', (yellow card) 50'	(Report)	Bocșan (yellow card) 27'; Plantak (yellow card) 38'; Pană (yellow card) 54'; Robert Țângulea (yellow card) 63'; Marin Mudražija (yellow card) 76'; Tsvetkov (yellow card) 90+3'	Stadium: Oțelul; Attendance: 1,000; Referee: Iulian Călin

9 September 2022 Matchday 6	Progresul Spartac	0-0	Oțelul Galați	Clinceni
16:30	Eugen Lixandru (yellow card) 71'		Neagu (yellow card) 68'; Yabré (yellow card) 87'	Stadium: Clinceni; Attendance: 300; Referee: Sorin Vădana

18 September 2022 Matchday 7	Oțelul Galați	2-1	FC Brașov	Galați
11:00	Mitoi 34'; Cârjan 54'; Răzvan Gorovei (yellow card) 29'	(Report)	Lazăr 89', (yellow card) 3'; Jovanović (yellow card) 18'; Constantin (yellow card) 32'; Marc (yellow card) 71'; Tudor Oltean (yellow card) 90+3'	Stadium: Oțelul; Attendance: 5,000; Referee: Cătălin Buși

2 October 2022 Matchday 8	Oțelul Galați	2-1	Viitorul Târgu Jiu	Galați
11:00	Cârjan 77', 90+3'; Andrei Rus (yellow card) 31'; Neagu (yellow card) 57'; Mitoi (yellow card) 88'	(Report)	Dodoi 64', (yellow card) 18'; Robert Dănescu (yellow card) 23'; Vlad Toma (yellow card) 43'; Pîrcălabu (yellow card) 55'; Brînzan (yellow card) 55'	Stadium: Oțelul; Referee: Mihai Amorăriței

8 October 2022 Matchday 9	Unirea Dej	2-0	Oțelul Galați	Dej
13:00	Angelo Cocian 8', 45'; Mihai Kereki (yellow card) 11'; Alexandru Pop (yellow card) 56'; Adrian Pop (yellow card) 66'		Cisotti (yellow card) 20'	Stadium: Unirea; Attendance: 1,200; Referee: Florin Ovidiu Mazilu

17 October 2022 Matchday 10	Oțelul Galați	1-0	Concordia Chiajna	Galați
18:15	Antonio Azinović 5'; Andrei Rus (yellow card) 87'; Dur-Bozoancă (yellow card) 90+1'	(Report)	Radu Simion (yellow card) 40'; Palmeș (yellow card) 42'; Giovani Ghimfuș (yellow card) 67'; Alin Nica (yellow card) 90+3'	Stadium: Oțelul; Attendance: 7,000; Referee: Vlad Baban

25 October 2022 Matchday 11	Steaua București	1-0	Oțelul Galați	București
17:00	Chunchukov 46'; Darius Oroian (yellow card) 48'; Mădălin Mihăescu (yellow card) 69'	(Report)	Neagu (yellow card) 28'; Cisotti (yellow card) 72'; Antonio Azinović (yellow card) 78'	Stadium: Steaua; Attendance: 3,000; Referee: Viorel Nicușor Flueran

1 November 2022 Matchday 12	Oțelul Galați	1-1	Gloria Buzău	Galați
17:00	Neagu 45+1', (yellow card) 30'; Panait (yellow card) 53'; Cisotti (yellow card) 61'; Yabré (yellow card) 74'; Antonio Azinović (yellow card) 90+2'		Gaitán 37', (yellow card) 32'; Neicuțescu (yellow card) 79'; Dudu (yellow card) 88'; Ariel López (yellow card) 54' (yellow-red card) 87'	Stadium: Oțelul; Attendance: 3,000; Referee: Robert Avram

5 November 2022 Matchday 13	Unirea Slobozia	1-0	Oțelul Galați	Slobozia
12:30	Constantin Toma 58' (pen.); Florinel Ibrian (yellow card) 36'; Robert Silaghi (yellow card) 76'		Mitoi (yellow card) 21'; Alin Nica (yellow card) 66'; Cârjan (yellow card) 68'; Răzvan Gorovei (red card) 26'	Stadium: 1 Mai; Attendance: 2,000; Referee: Andrei Antonie

15 November 2022 Matchday 14	Oțelul Galați	1-0	Minaur	Galați
20:30	Jardan 37'; Bokhashvili (yellow card) 48'; Mihai Adăscăliței (yellow card) 72'	(Report)	Ricky Gnéba (yellow card) 14'; Ciprian Stanciu (yellow card) 67'; Cassamá Muacir (yellow card) 89'; Mondragón (yellow card) 90+1'	Stadium: Oțelul; Attendance: 3,500; Referee: Valentin Naidin

27 November 2022 Matchday 15	Ripensia	0-1	Oțelul Galați	Timișoara
14:00	David Ciurel (yellow card) 7'; Gabriel Stoi (yellow card) 80'; Nicolae Sofran (yellow card) 89'	(Report)	Neagu 15'; Răzvan Gorovei (yellow card) 35'; Mitoi (yellow card) 71'	Stadium: Electrica; Attendance: 400; Referee: Cristian Codrea

3 December 2022 Matchday 16	Oțelul Galați	3-0	Metaloglobus	Galați
11:00	Cisotti 13' (pen.); Markovic 70'; Alin Nica 75'; Neagu (yellow card) 44'	(Report)	Zukanović (yellow card) 15'; Paul Chiorean (yellow card) 18'; Chatziterzoglou (yellow card) 40'	Stadium: Oțelul; Attendance: 1,500; Referee: Robu Ovidiu

25 February 2023 Matchday 17	CSM Slatina	0-0	Oțelul Galați	Slatina
12:00	Anghelina (yellow card) 64'	(Report)	Živulić (yellow card) 85'	Stadium: 1 Mai; Attendance: 3,000; Referee: Roman George Catalin

3 March 2023 Matchday 18	Oțelul Galați	1-0	Csíkszereda	Galați
17:00	Fatai 13'; Cisotti (yellow card) 18'; Živulić (yellow card) 74'; Rareș Pop (yellow card) 90'	(Report)	Botond Szondi (yellow card) 20'; Claudiu Apro (yellow card) 47'; Kelemen (yellow card) 53'	Stadium: Oțelul; Attendance: 7,000; Referee: Florin Ovidiu Mazilu

12 March 2023 Matchday 19	Dumbrăvița	1-1	Oțelul Galați	Dumbrăvița
12:00	Piftor 11'; Cătălin Trifon (yellow card) 45+2'; Tudor Moțiu (yellow card) 64'; Dragan Paulevici (yellow card) 73'	(Report)	Ursu 14'; Fatai (yellow card) 37'	Stadium: Ștefan Dobay; Attendance: 500; Referee: Marius Chioran

19 March 2023 Matchday PO-1	Oțelul Galați	1-2	Poli Iași	Galați
14:15	Cisotti 11', (yellow card) 75'; Răzvan Gorovei (yellow card) 34'; Andrei Rus (yellow card) 71'; Costin Ghiocel (red card) 26'		Itu 12'; Antonio Dumitru 68'; Alexandru Mogoș (yellow card) 31'; Musi (yellow card) 40'; Hlistei (yellow card) 66'; Cristea (yellow card) 80'	Stadium: Oțelul; Attendance: 10,000; Referee: Catalin Busi

30 March 2023 Matchday PO-2	Oțelul Galați	3-2	Steaua București	Galați
20:00	Fatai 14', 21'; Ursu 32'; Cisotti (yellow card) 16'; Sîrghi (yellow card) 38'; Mihai Adăscăliței (yellow card) 57'; Živulić (yellow card) 90+2'; Cârjan (yellow card) 90+4'	(Report)	Bodișteanu 51', 61'; Beța (yellow card) 71'; Adrian Ilie (yellow card) 84'	Stadium: Oțelul; Attendance: 9,000; Referee: Viorel Nicușor Flueran

7 April 2023 Matchday PO-3	Dinamo București	3-0	Oțelul Galați	București
20:30	Ghezali 62', 87'; Țîră 90+5'; Amzăr (yellow card) 29'; Gabriel Moura (yellow card) 79'		Cisotti (yellow card) 63'; Andrei Rus (yellow card) 90+4'	Stadium: Arcul de Triumf; Attendance: 6,000; Referee: Rusandu Lucian

13 April 2023 Matchday PO-4	Oțelul Galați	1-0	Gloria Buzău	Galați
20:00	Ursu 3', (yellow card) 40'; Cisotti (yellow card) 14'; Panait (yellow card) 85'; Dur-Bozoancă (yellow card) 88'		Ariel López (yellow card) 50'; Bogdan Oteliță (yellow card) 61'; Daniel Vîrtej (yellow card) 76'; Alexandru (yellow card) 90+4'	Stadium: Oțelul; Referee: Dumitrache Bogdan

21 April 2023 Matchday PO-5	Unirea Dej	0-1	Oțelul Galați	Dej
17:30	Adrian Pop (yellow card) 63'; Alexandru Gîț (yellow card) 70'; Matiș (yellow card) 71'; Fulga (yellow card) 90'		Jardan 7', (yellow card) 70'; Andrei Rus (yellow card) 25'; Neagu (yellow card) 75'; Živulić (yellow card) 85'; Răzvan Gorovei (yellow card) 89'	Stadium: Unirea; Attendance: 2,000; Referee: Omuţ Marius

2 May 2023 Matchday PO-6	Poli Iași	2-0	Oțelul Galați	Iași
17:30	Roman 45+1'; Harrison 58'; Alexandru Mogoș (yellow card) 90+1'; Viorel Lică (yellow card) 90+1'		Cârjan (yellow card) 32'; Gabriel Nedelea (yellow card) 69'; Živulić (yellow card) 90+1'	Stadium: Emil Alexandrescu; Attendance: 9,000; Referee: Coza Ionuţ

7 May 2023 Matchday PO-7	Steaua București	1-1	Oțelul Galați	București
14:30	Chipirliu 54' (pen.), (yellow card) 65'; Mihăescu (yellow card) 48'; Balgiu (yellow card) 77'; Enceanu (yellow card) 88'; Beța (red card) 0'	(Report)	Cisotti 88'; Panait (yellow card) 16'; Rareș Scocîlcă (yellow card) 53'; Ursu (yellow card) 73'	Stadium: Steaua; Attendance: 6,124; Referee: Rareș George Vidican

11 May 2023 Matchday PO-8	Oțelul Galați	0-2	Dinamo București	Galați
20:30	Fatai (yellow card) 57'		Larrucea 6', (yellow card) 18'; Bani 27'; Amzăr (yellow card) 10'; Patriche (yellow card) 76'; Roșu (yellow card) 79'	Stadium: Oțelul; Attendance: 8,000; Referee: Dima Iulian

16 May 2023 Matchday PO-9	Gloria Buzău	1-0	Oțelul Galați	Buzău
19:00	Ariel López 38', (yellow card) 42'; Marko (yellow card) 18'; Andrei Rus (yellow card) 87'; Alexandru (yellow card) 90+2'; Greu (yellow card) 90+6'		Fatai (yellow card) 3'; Cisotti (yellow card) 47'; Gabriel Nedelea (yellow card) 90+6'	Stadium: Municipal; Attendance: 4,000; Referee: Flueran Viorel Nicusor

21 May 2023 Matchday PO-10	Oțelul Galați	1-0	Unirea Dej	Galați
13:00	Răzvan Gorovei 70' (pen.), (yellow card) 70'; Cisotti (yellow card) 15'		Cristian Chira (yellow card) 16'; Alexandru Gîț (yellow card) 69'; Ciprian Călugăr (yellow card) 75'	Stadium: Oțelul; Attendance: 10,000; Referee: Coza Ionuţ

=== Cupa României ===
14 September 2022 3rd Round	Viitorul Ianca	1-3	Oțelul Galați	Ianca
16:30	Costin Ciucureanu 18'	(Report)	Bokhashvili 14'; Markovic 59'; Mitoi 67'	Stadium: Ștefan Vrăbioru

28 September 2022 Play-off	Jiul Petroșani	2-2 (a.e.t.) (0-3 p)	Oțelul Galați	Petroșani
16:00	Gabby Batchabi 75'; Bogdan Istratie 100'	(Report)	Bokhashvili 90+1', 92'	Stadium: Petre Libardi; Attendance: 5,000; Referee: Marius Naidin
	Penalties
	Sean Aerts (penalty missed); Bogdan Keszeg (penalty missed); Stephane Ferhaoui (penalty missed)		(penalty scored) Markovic; (penalty scored) Mihai Adăscăliței; (penalty scored) Berisha

20 October 2022 Group-stage 1	Oțelul Galați	0-1	Mioveni	Galați
15:00	Andrei Rus (yellow card) 37'	(Report)	Carnat 11', (yellow card) 26'; Iacob (yellow card) 33'; Garutti (yellow card) 60'; Burnea (yellow card) 80'	Stadium: Oțelul; Referee: Andrei Moroiță

10 November 2022 Group-stage 2	Oțelul Galați	0-0	FCSB	Galați
21:00	Sîrghi (yellow card) 10'; Panait (yellow card) 28'; Sțefan Farcaș (yellow card) 48'; Cisotti (yellow card) 51'; Mihai Adăscăliței (yellow card) 90+7'	(Report)	Dulca (yellow card) 9'; Nikolov (yellow card) 52'; Haruț (yellow card) 57'; Coman (yellow card) 90+4'	Stadium: Oțelul; Attendance: 13,000; Referee: Rareș George Vidican

8 December 2022 Group-stage 3	Oțelul Galați	0-2	Gloria Buzău	Galați
20:00			Dragoș Lazăr 29'; Boiciuc 50'	Stadium: Oțelul; Referee: Baban Vlad

=== Friendlies ===
1 July 2022	Oțelul Galați	6-0	Unirea Braniștea	Galați
19:00	Yabré 16'; Laurențiu Maxim 26'; Cisotti 40'; Jardan 62'; Mitoi 65'; Robert Băceanu 90'	(Report)		Stadium: Oțelul

9 July 2022	Oțelul Galați	0-1	FCSB	Galați
20:00		(Report)	Coman 67'	Stadium: Oțelul; Attendance: 13,500

13 July 2022	Gloria Buzău	4-0	Oțelul Galați	Ghimbav
11:00	Honciu 6'; Ciobanu 33'; Cârstocea 52'; A. Munteanu 79'	(Report)		Stadium: Campo Verde

16 July 2022	Unirea Slobozia	3-0	Oțelul Galați	Ghimbav
11:00	Christ Afalna 47'; Alin Boțogan 64'; Florinel Ibrian 90+3'			Stadium: Campo Verde

19 July 2022	FC Brașov	1-1	Oțelul Galați	Tărlungeni
18:00	Bogdan Roșu 90+2'		Laurențiu Maxim 18'	Stadium: Comunal

22 July 2022	Metaloglobus	2-0	Oțelul Galați	Ghimbav
11:00	61', 74'			Stadium: Campo Verde

30 July 2022	Oțelul Galați	4-1	Farul II	Galați
18:00	Alin Nica, Răzvan Gorovei; Jardan			Stadium: Oțelul

4 February 2023	Besa Dobërdoll	0-0	Oțelul Galați	Antalya
14:00		(Report)		Stadium: Antalya

6 February 2023	Olympic Tashkent	1-1	Oțelul Galați	Antalya
15:30	Antonio Cruceru 10'	(Report)		Stadium: Antalya

9 February 2023	SSV Ulm	0-2	Oțelul Galați	Antalya
15:30		(Report)	Moritz Hannemann 21'; Chessa 45'	Stadium: Antalya

17 February 2023	Metalul Buzău	0-0	Oțelul Galați	Buzău
15:30		(Report)	Moritz Hannemann 21'; Chessa 45'	Stadium: Metalul

== See also ==
- ASC Oțelul Galați
- 2022–23 Liga II
- 2022–23 Cupa României
