= Romanians in Germany =

Romanians in Germany Românii din Germania Rumänen in Deutschland
- Distribution of Romanian citizens in Germany (2021)

Total population
- 1,096,000 with Romanian ancestry (2022); 883,670 Romanian citizens (2022)

Regions with significant populations
- Berlin · Munich · Frankfurt · Hamburg · Rhein-Ruhr · Nuremberg · Stuttgart · Bremen · Düsseldorf

Languages
- German • Romanian Dialects: Transylvanian Saxon; Transylvanian Landler; Swabian German (including, most notably, Banat Swabian and Sathmar Swabian); Zipser German; Walser German

Religion
- Eastern Orthodox Christianity (Romanian Orthodox Church), Protestant, Roman Catholic, Greek Catholic

Romanians in Germany are one of the sizable communities of the Romanian diaspora in Western Europe. According to German statistics, in 2022, the number of Romanian citizens in Germany was 883,670. The number of people with Romanian ancestry in 2022 (defined as all persons who migrated to the present area of the Federal Republic of Germany after 1949, plus all foreign nationals born in Germany and all persons born in Germany as German nationals with at least one parent who migrated to Germany or was born in Germany as a foreign national) was 1,096,000. Most of the Romanians in Germany belong to German ethnic communities, such us Transylvanian Saxons and Banat Swabians.

== History ==
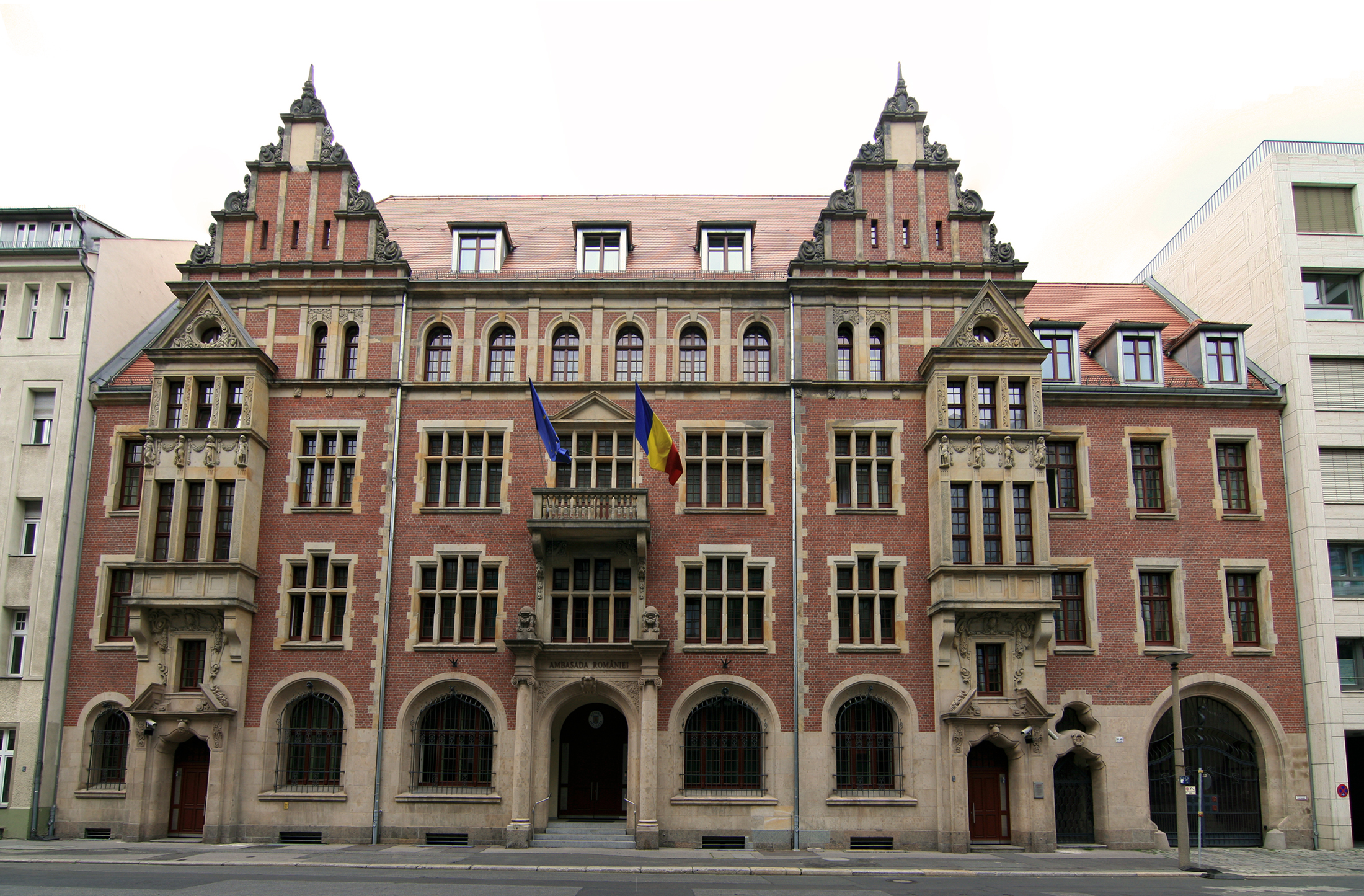
Romanian embassy in Berlin

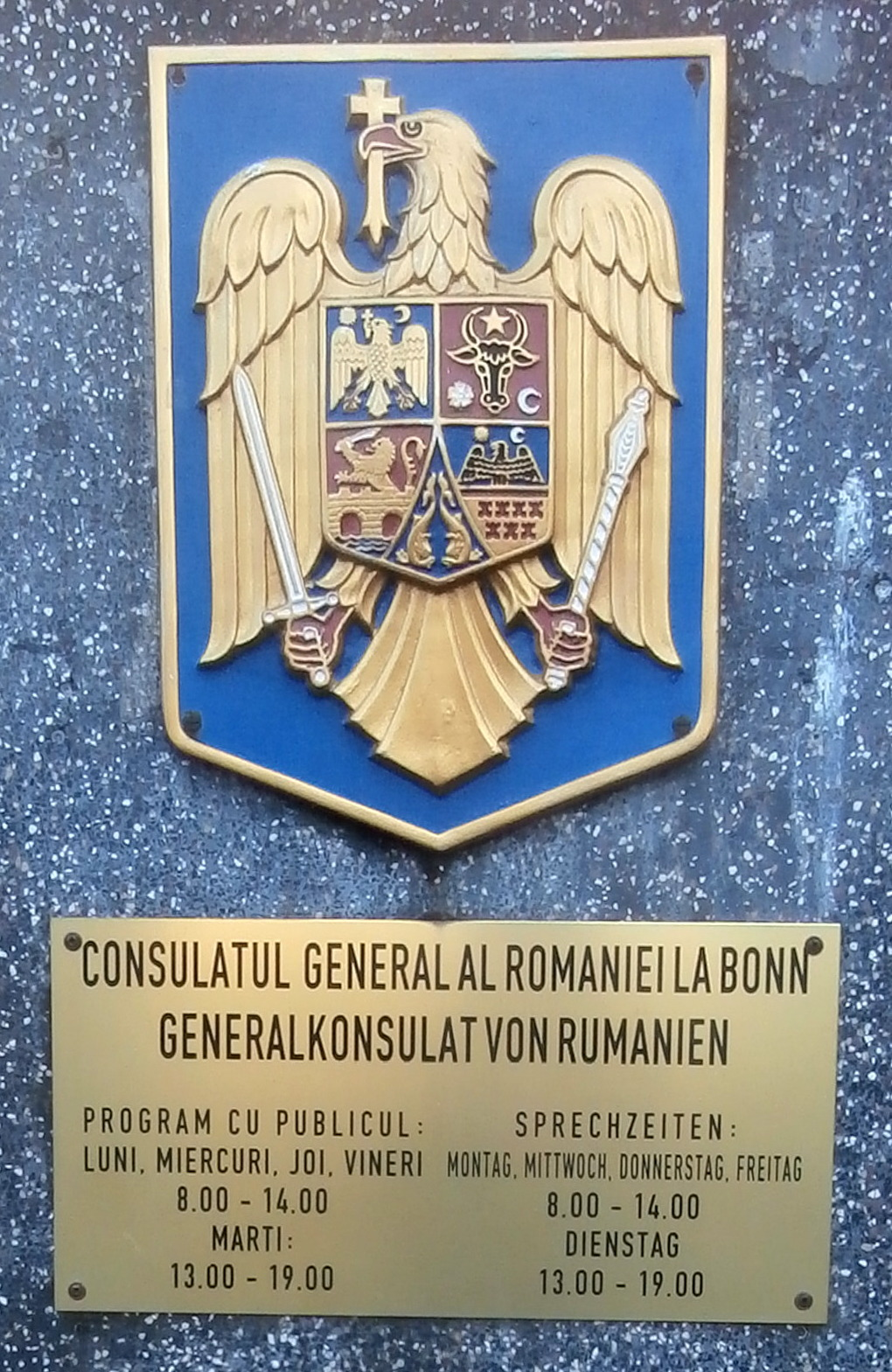
Romanian general consulate in Bonn, North Rhine-Westphalia

Emigration to Germany from Romania was common throughout the 20th century, and continued steadily way into the early 21st century. Large numbers of ethnic Germans of Romania (most notably Transylvanian Saxons and Banat Swabians) left the country prior, during, and after the events that ultimately led to World War II.

In the times of the communist regime in Romania, albeit the borders were officially closed by authorities, significant numbers of Romanian-Germans were allowed to emigrate to West Germany, particularly in the later years of the Ceaușescu era. This formed part of a series of ethnic migrations (including Jews to Israel and Hungarians to Hungary), which were tolerated under the then socialist rulership. During the 1980s, more than half of the people who left Romania went to Germany.

After the Romanian Revolution which took place in December 1989, there has been a mass migration of Transylvania Saxons to Germany, approximately half a million of them immigrated to Germany.

== Distribution ==
According to German statistics from 2016, the number of Romanian citizens in Germany on 31 December 2015 was 452,718, which was up from 94,326 in 2008. By 2022, the number had increased to 883,670 Romanian citizens.

Numbers of Romanians in larger cities
#	City	People
1.	Berlin	24,264
2.	Munich	18,845
3.	Nuremberg	14,903
4.	Frankfurt	10,451
5.	Hamburg	10,010
6.	Duisburg	8,853
7.	Augsburg	7,242
8.	Karlsruhe	6,269
9.	Stuttgart	6,121
10.	Mannheim	5,763
11.	Offenbach	5,471
12.	Cologne	4,841
13.	Düsseldorf	4,756
14.	Essen	4,652
15.	Dortmund	4,567
16.	Bremen	4,243
17.	Gelsenkirchen	4,216
18.	Leipzig	4,161
19.	Wiesbaden	3,265
20.	Hanover	3,135

Distribution of Romanian citizens by federal state (as of 2022):
Federal state	Number
Bayern	209,865
Baden-Württemberg	178,240
Nordrhein-Westfalen	164,220
Hessen	82,010
Niedersachsen	74,805
Rheinland-Pfalz	48,975
Berlin	27,990
Schleswig-Holstein	20,210
Sachsen	15,120
Thüringen	13,475
Sachsen-Anhalt	10,740
Saarland	9,870
Hamburg	9,790
Brandenburg	8,730
Mecklenburg-Vorpommern	5,570
Bremen	4,060

== Notable people ==
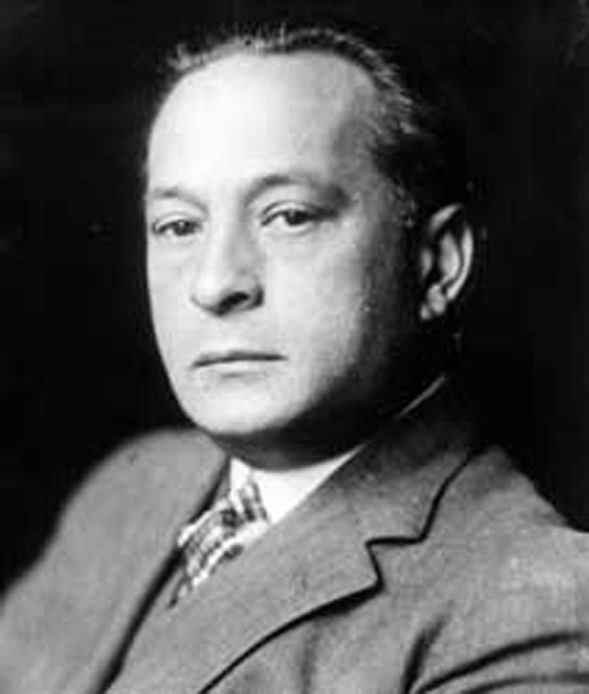
Lupu Pick

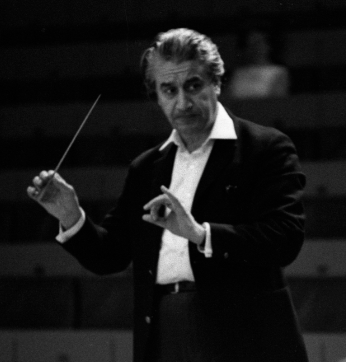
Sergiu Celibidache

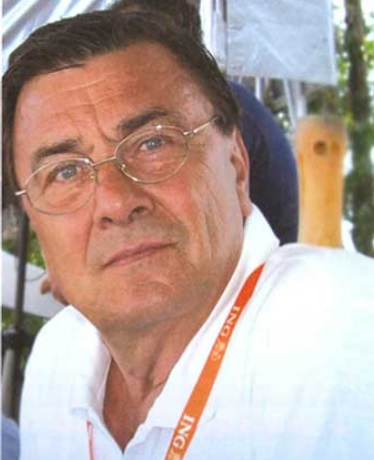
Nico Firoiu

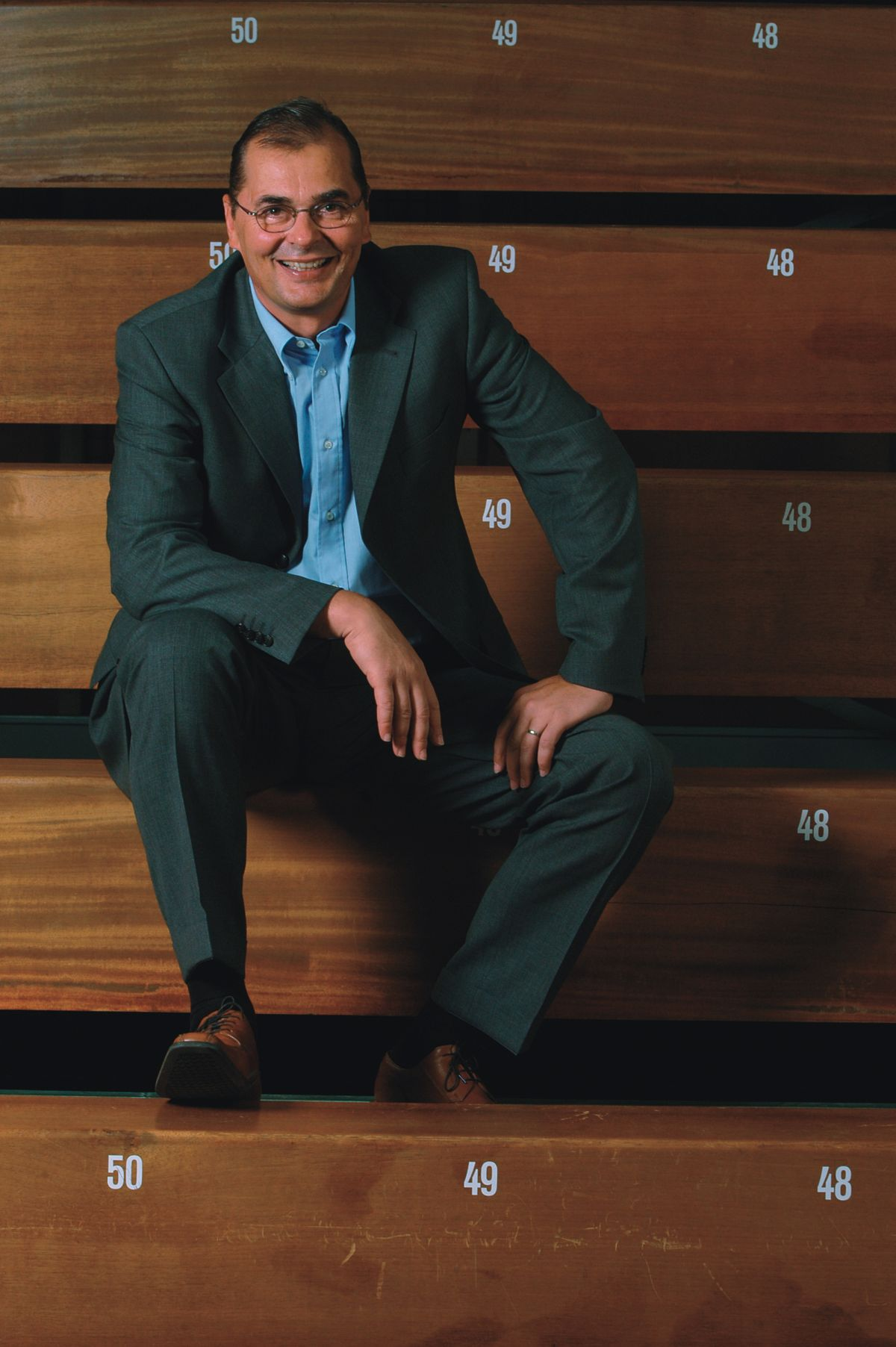
Stelian Moculescu

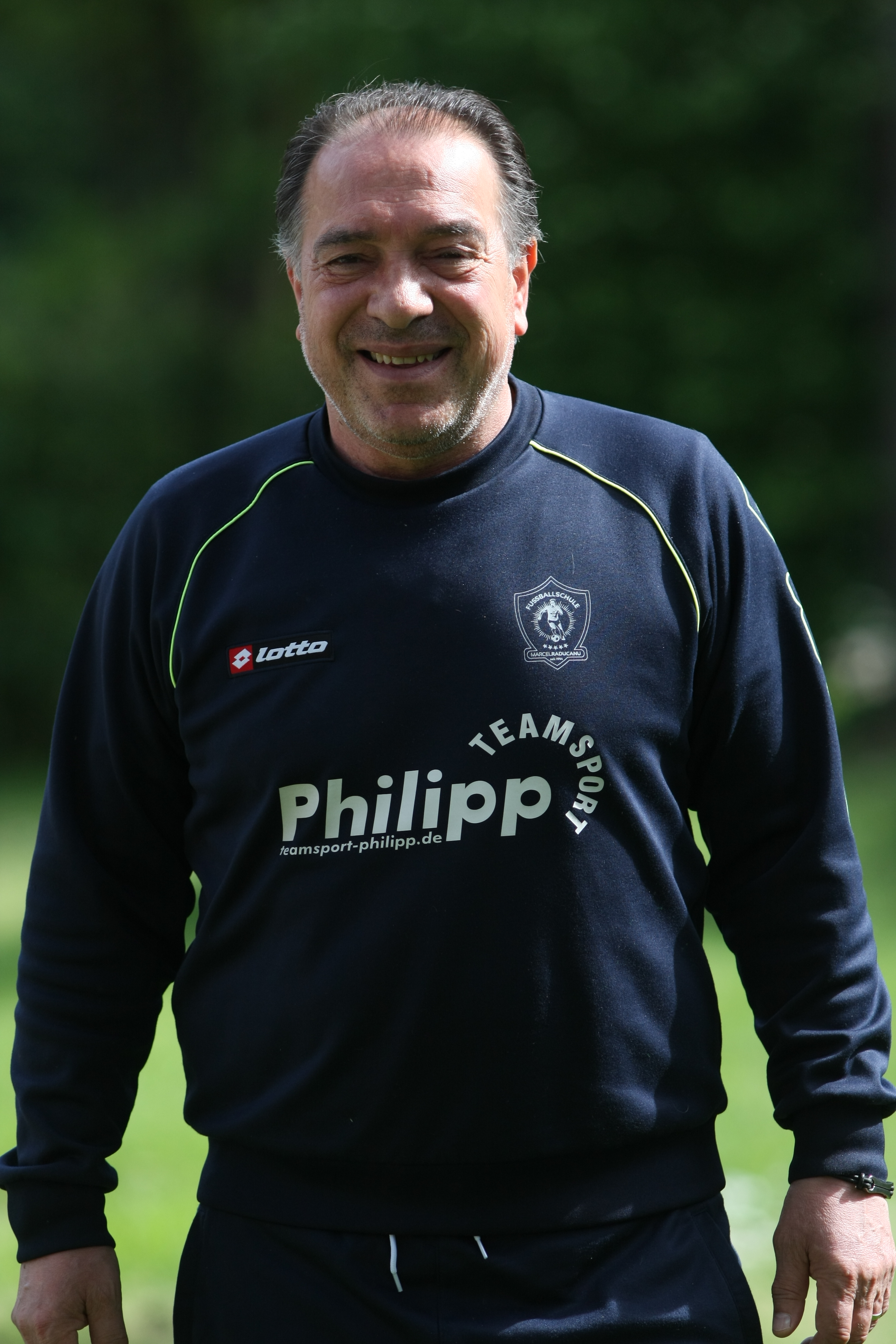
Marcel Răducanu

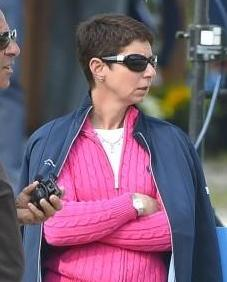
Monica Theodorescu

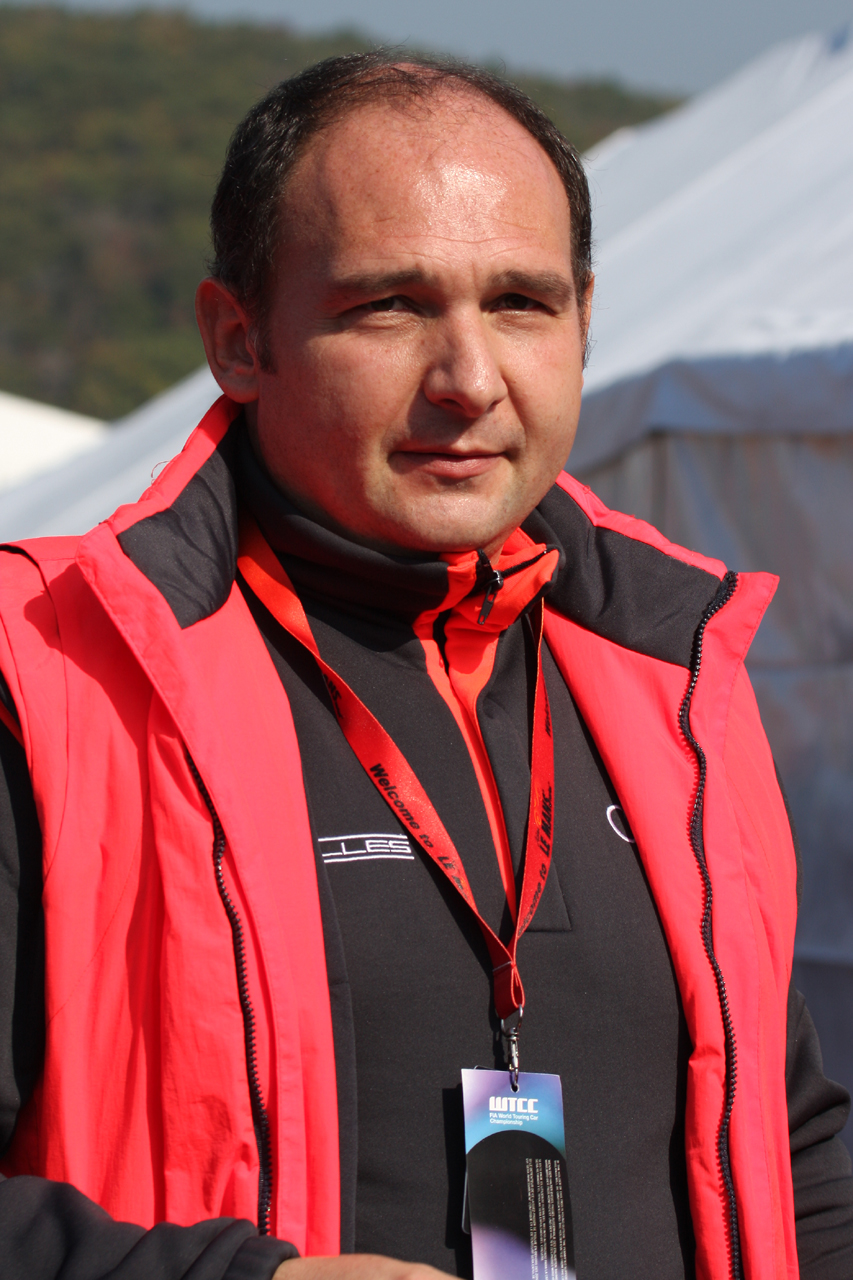
Călin Colesnic

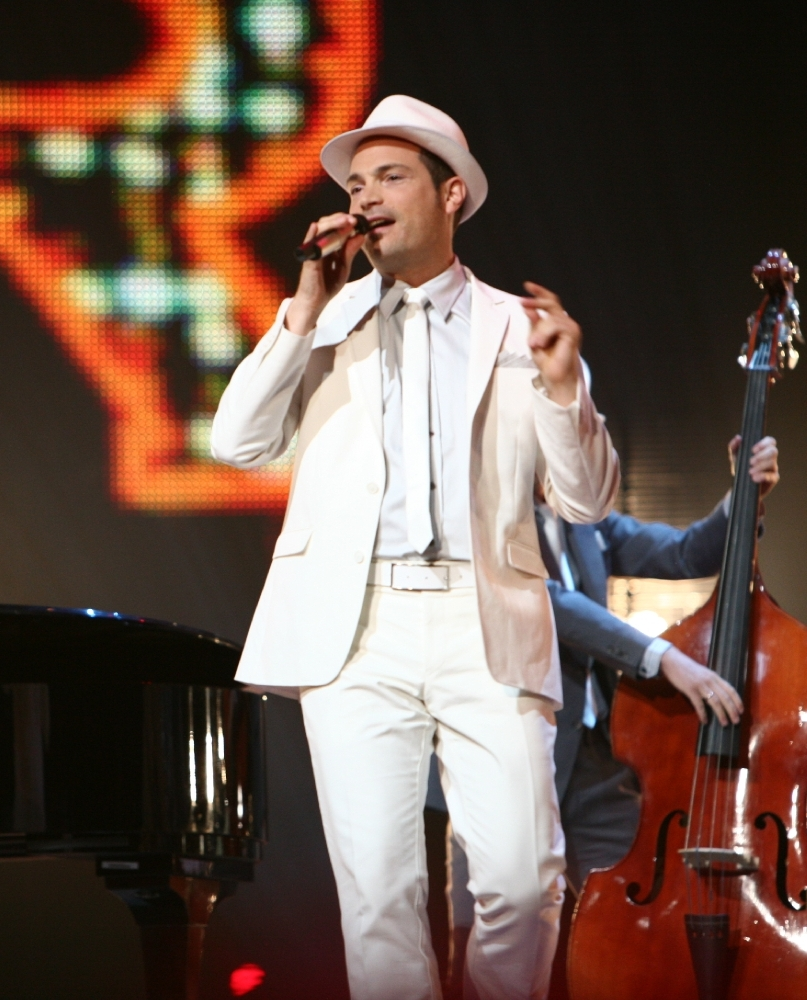
Roger Cicero

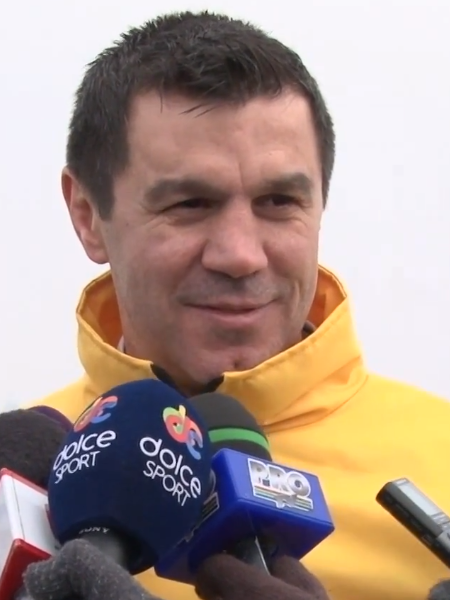
Mihai Leu

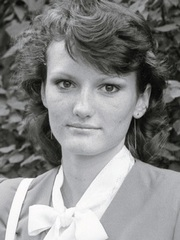
Alina Astafei

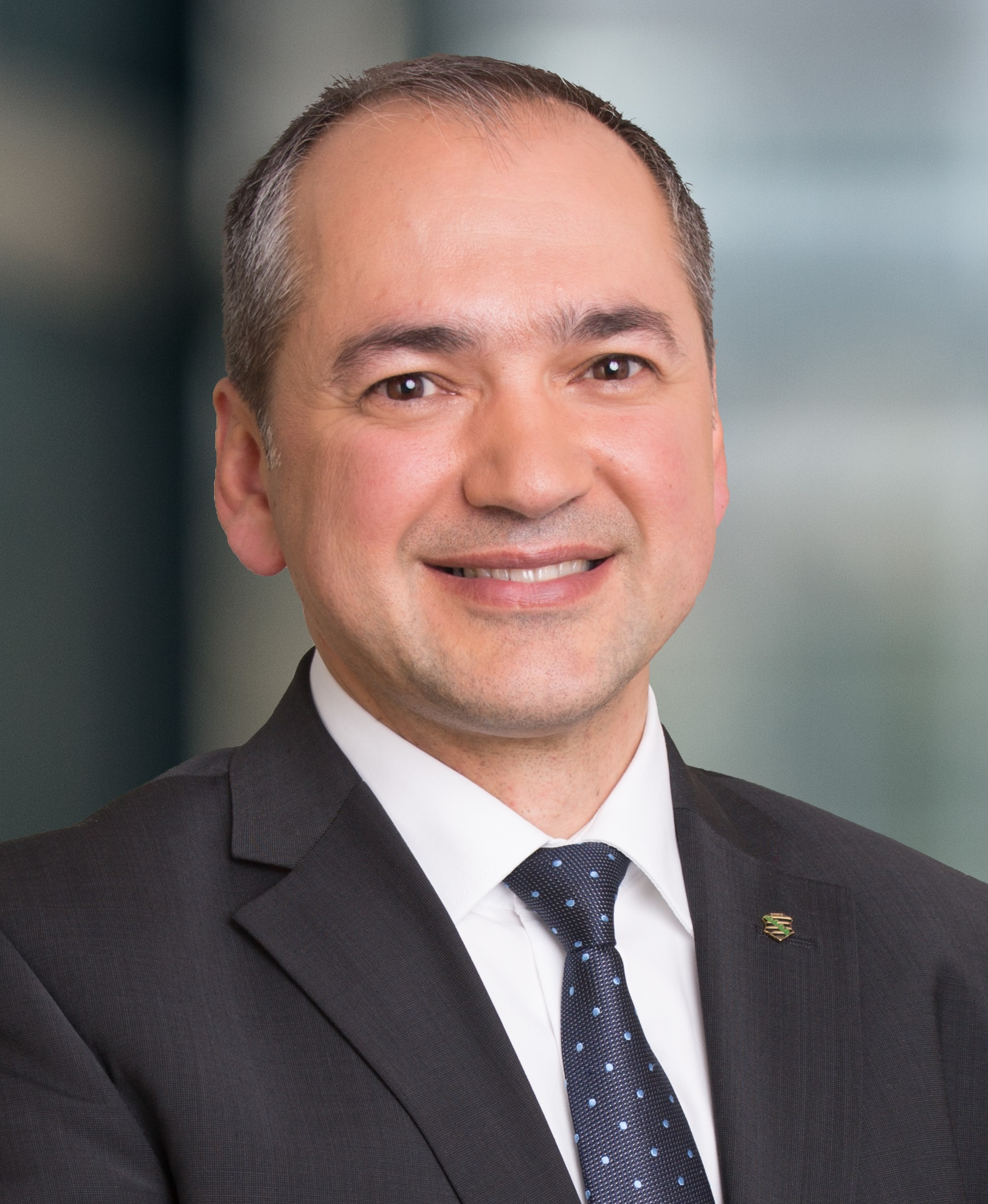
Octavian Ursu

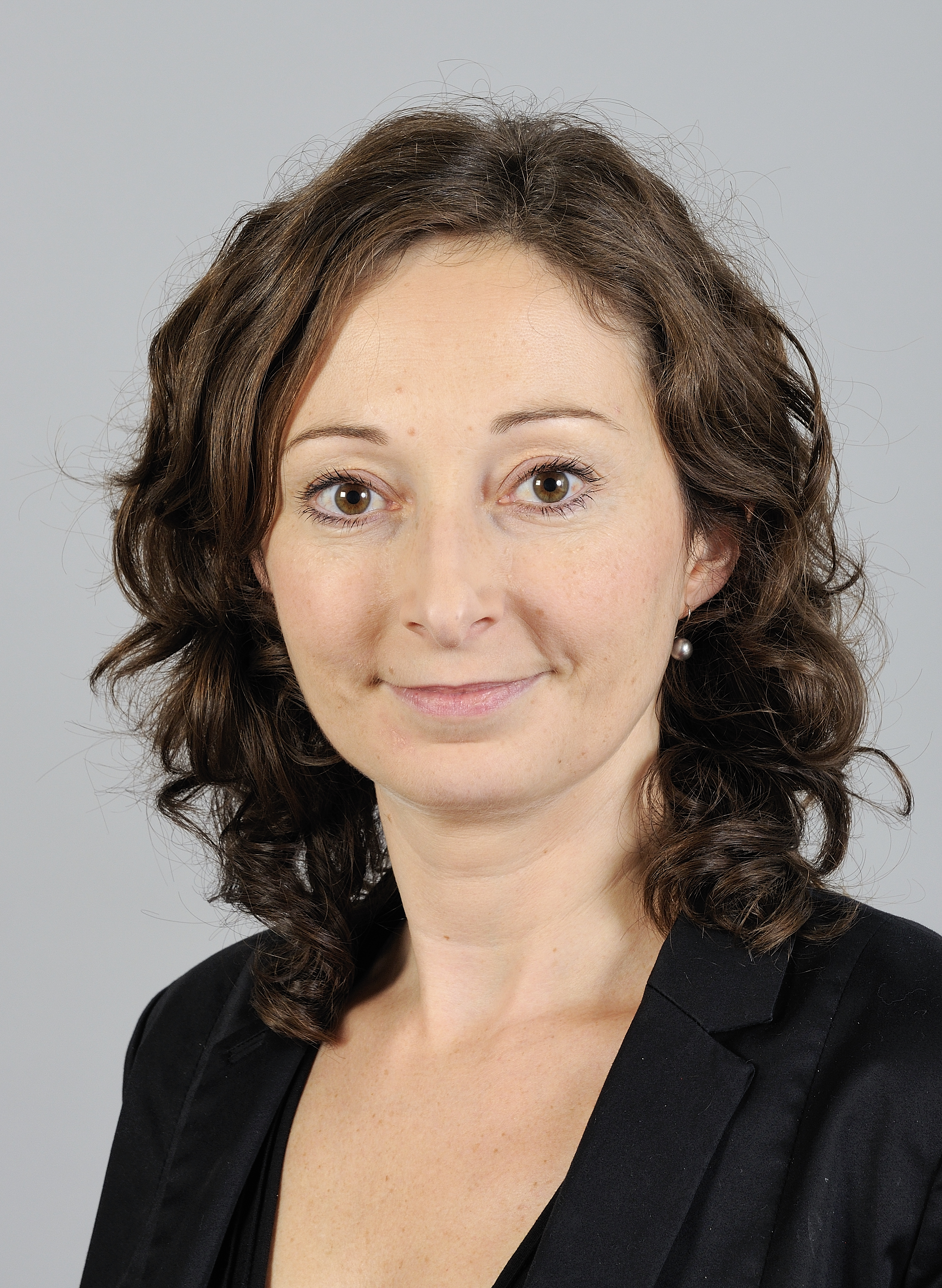
Ramona Pop

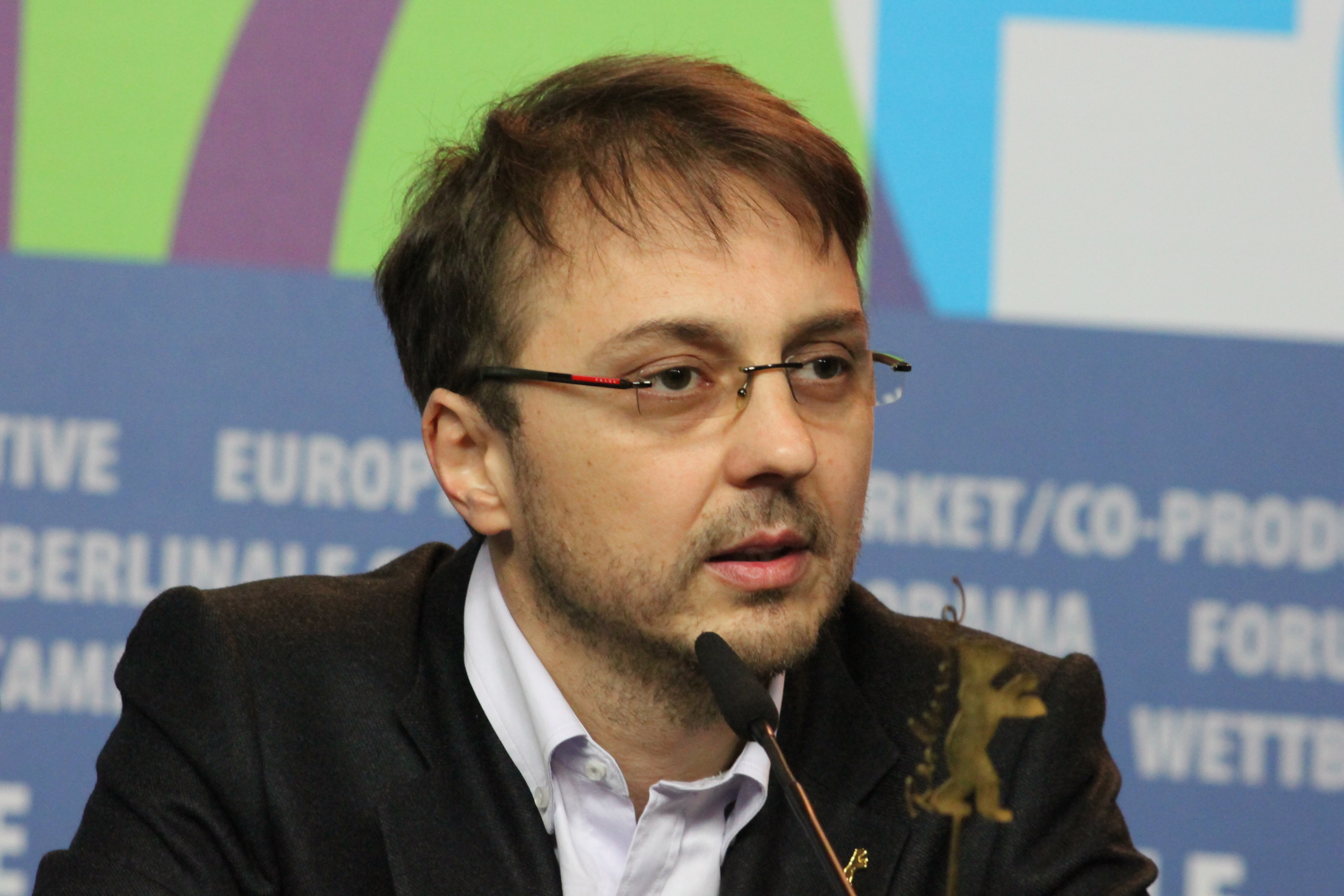
Călin Netzer

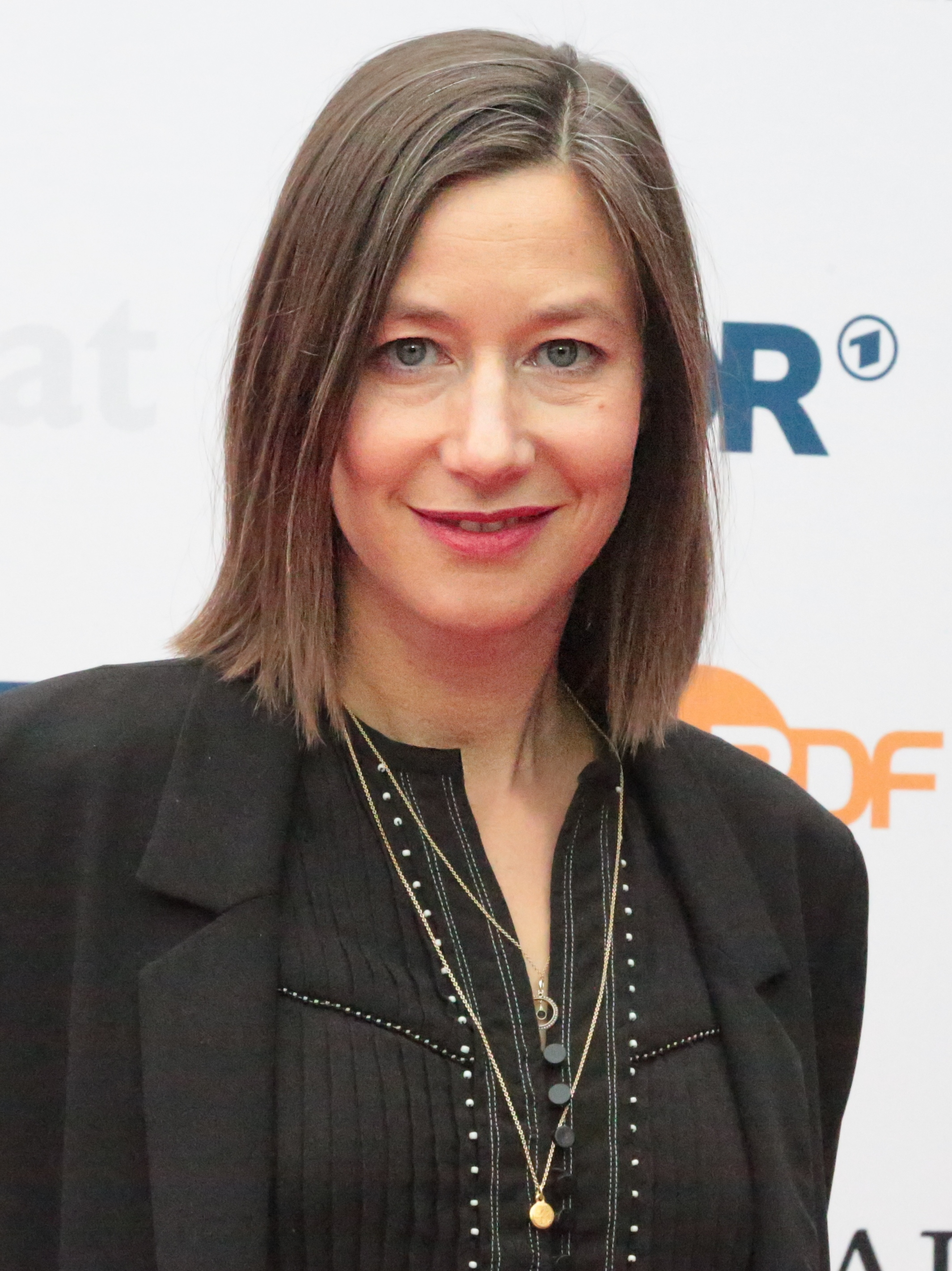
Johanna Wokalek

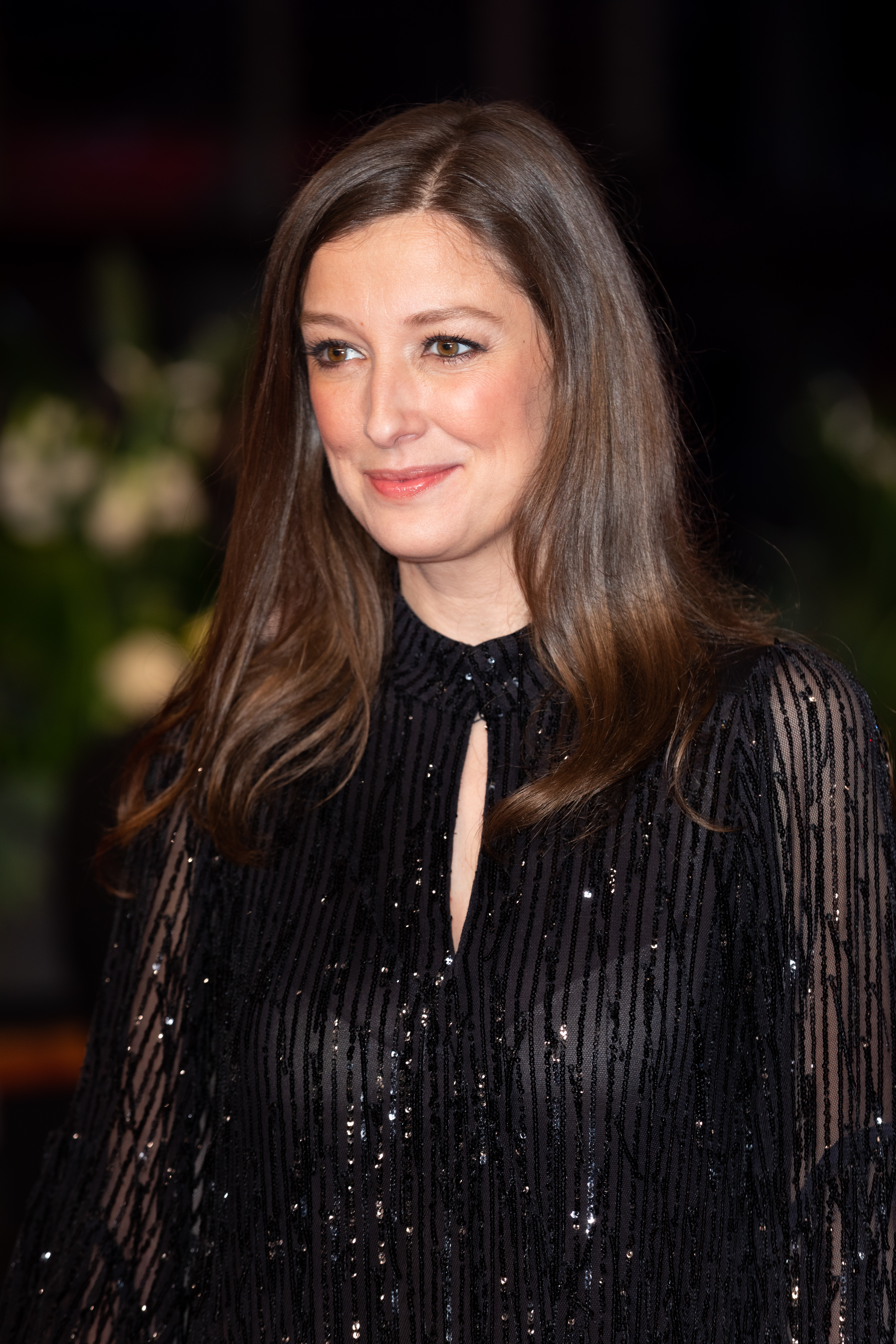
Alexandra Maria Lara

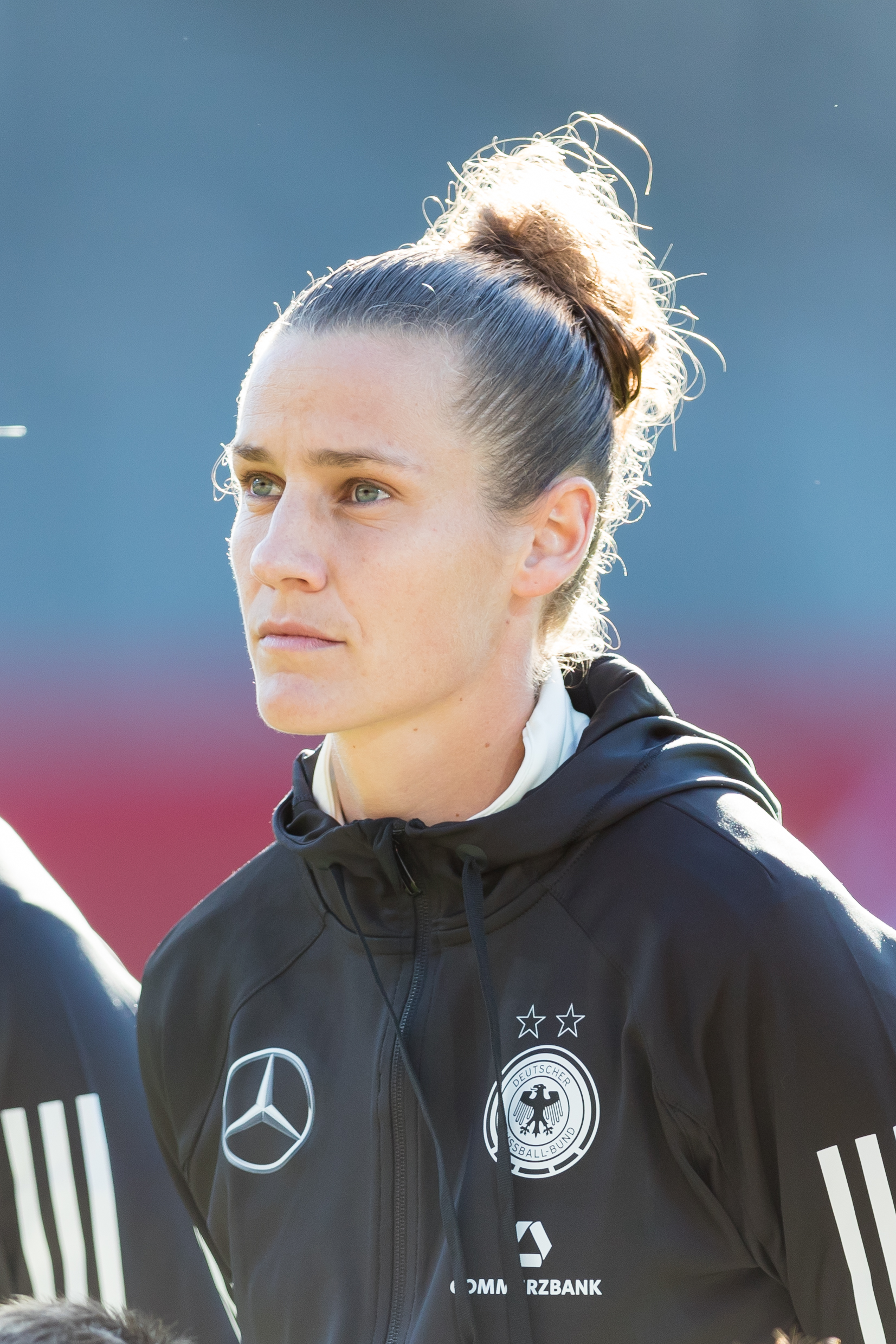
Simone Laudehr

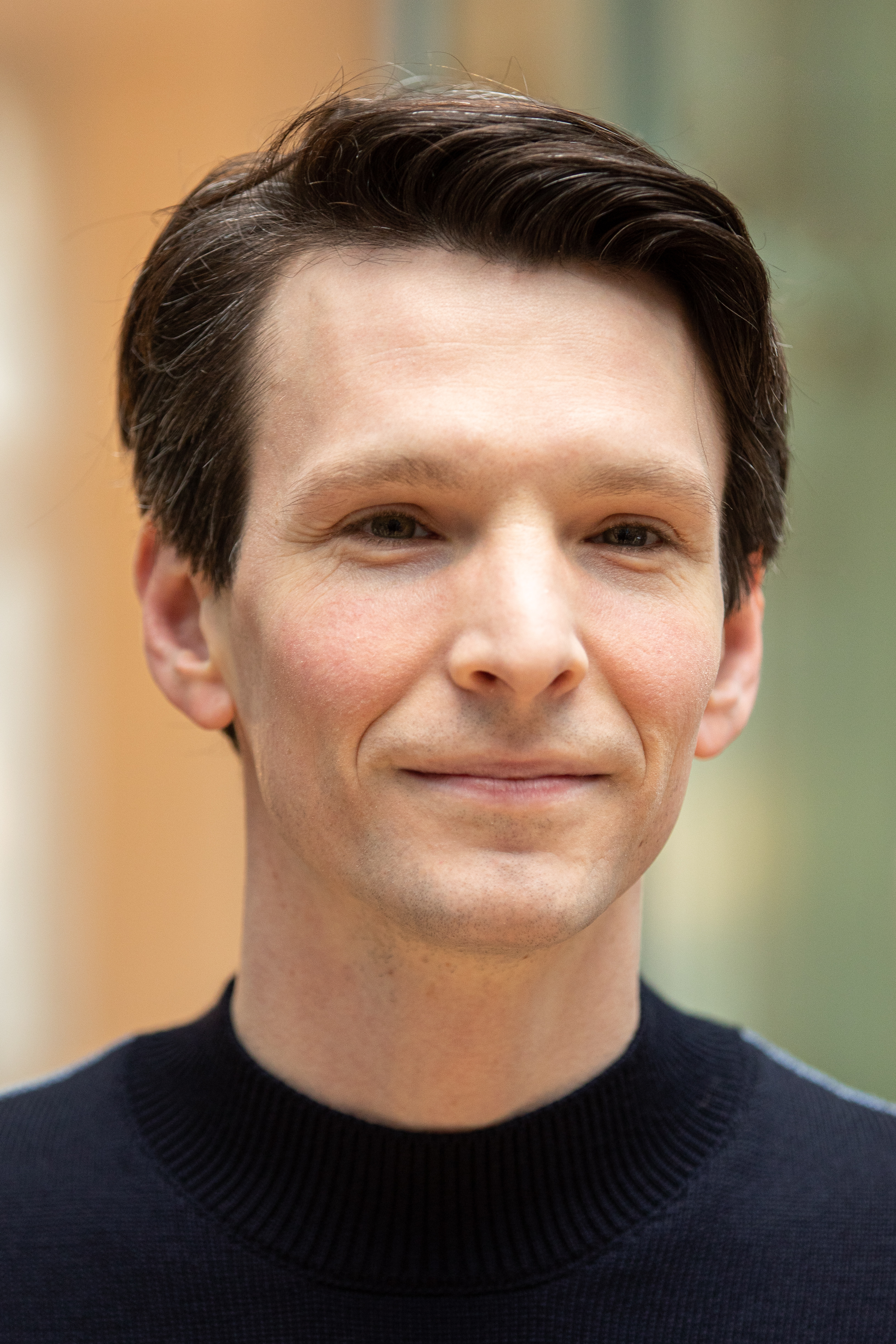
Sabin Tambrea

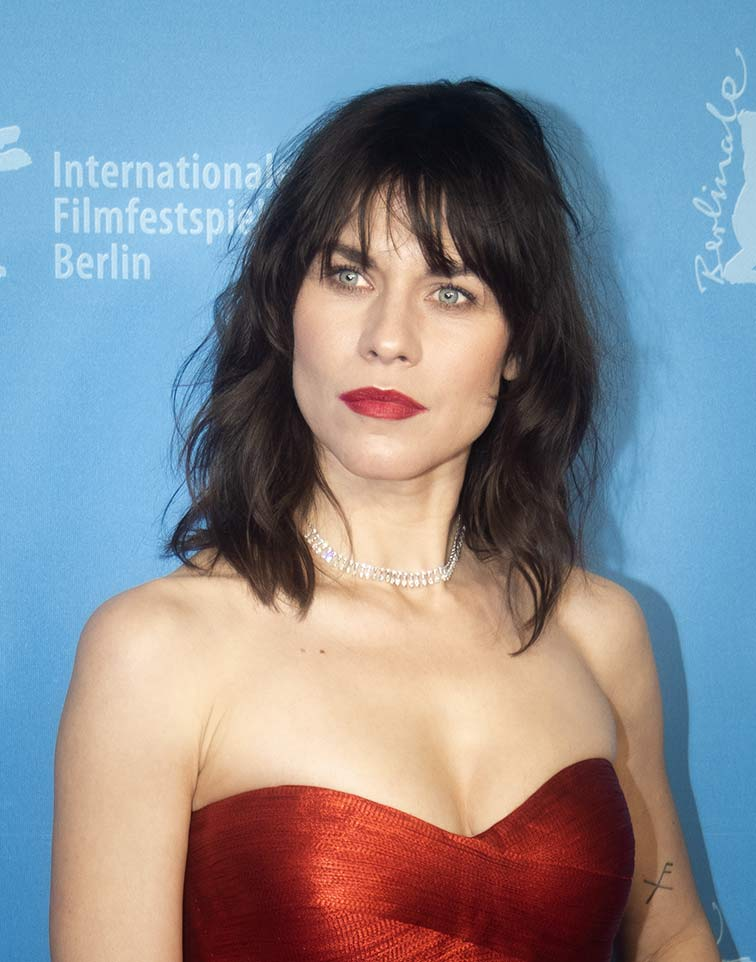
Ana Ularu

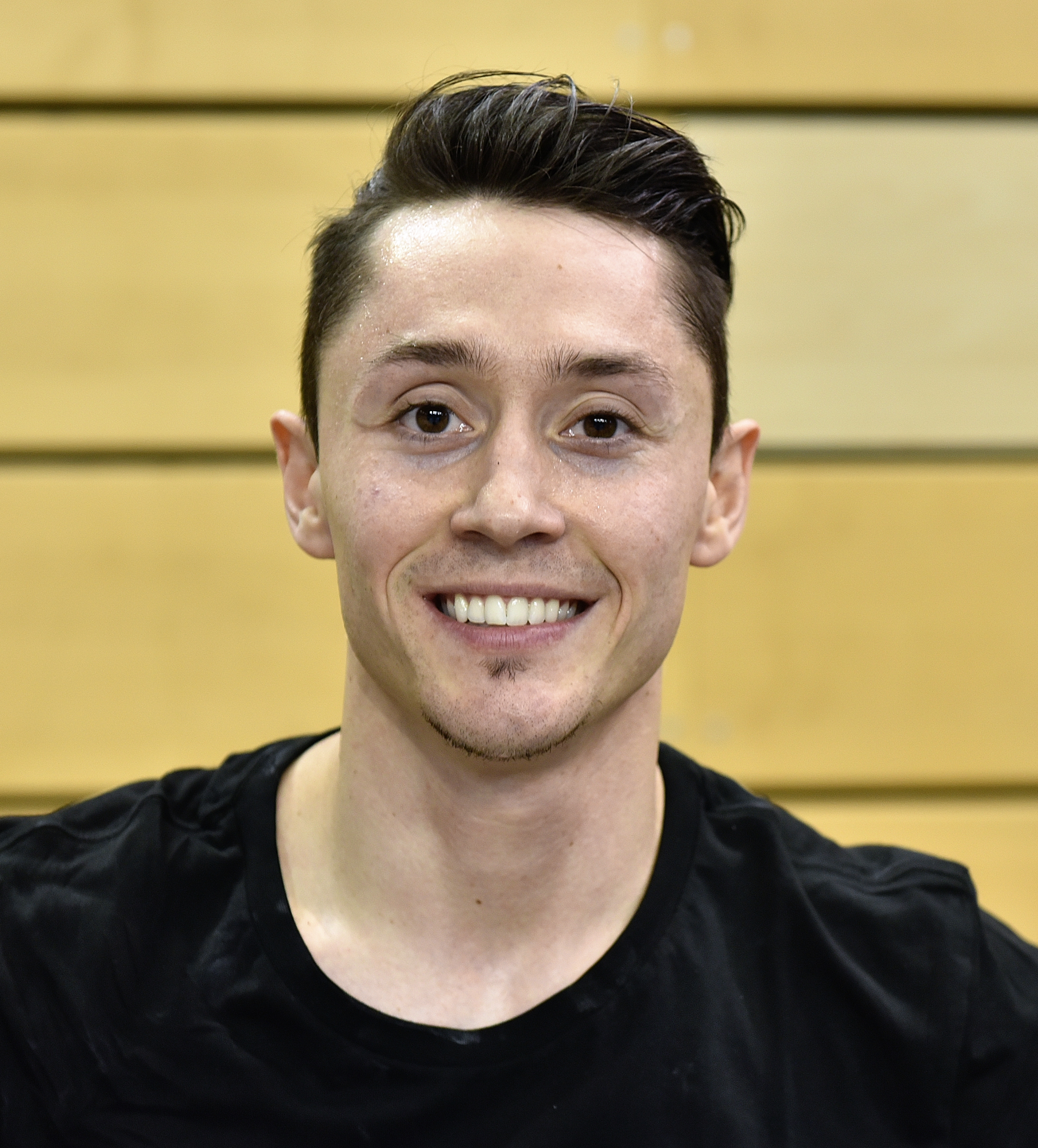
Andreas Toba

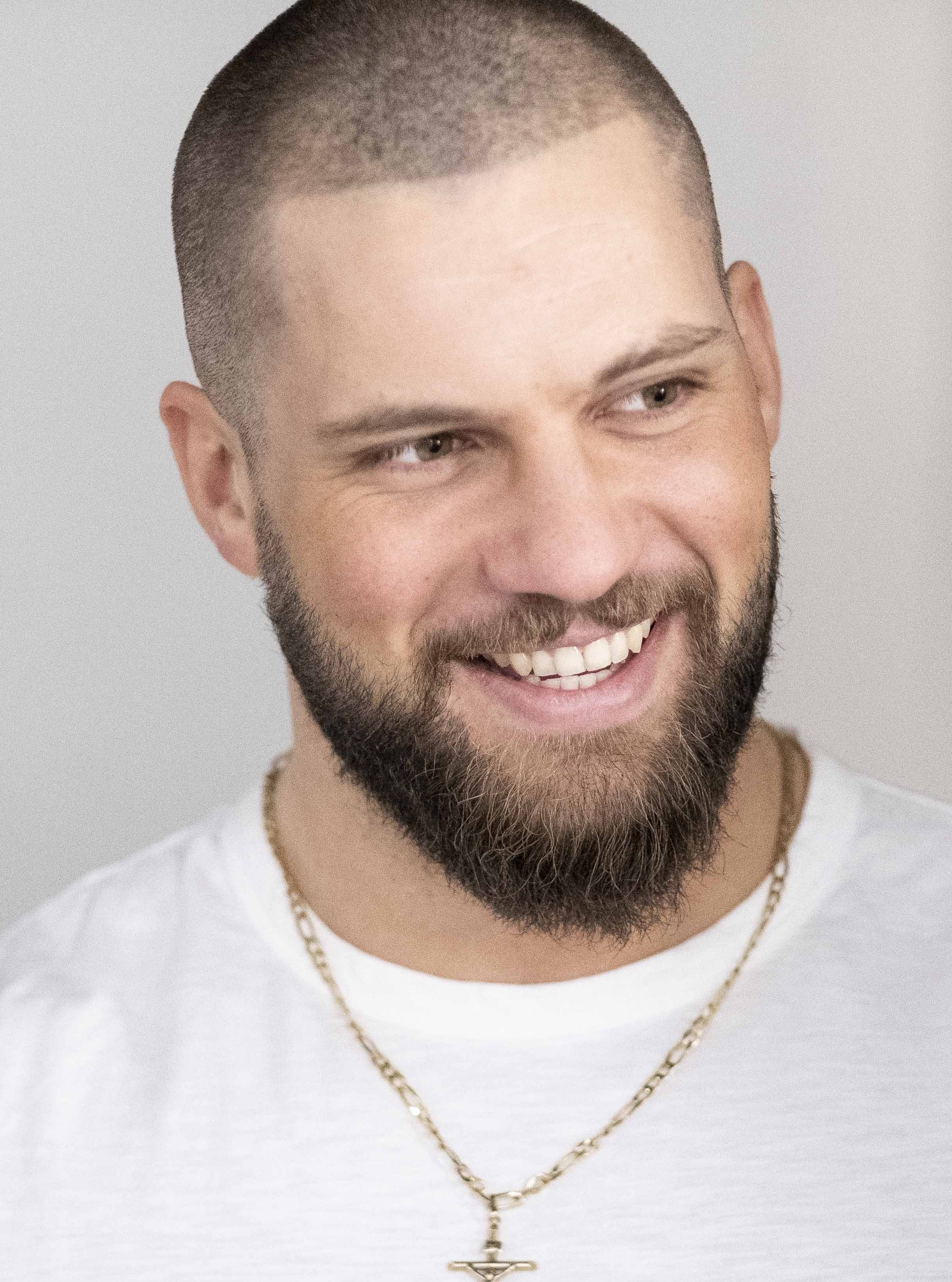
Florian Munteanu

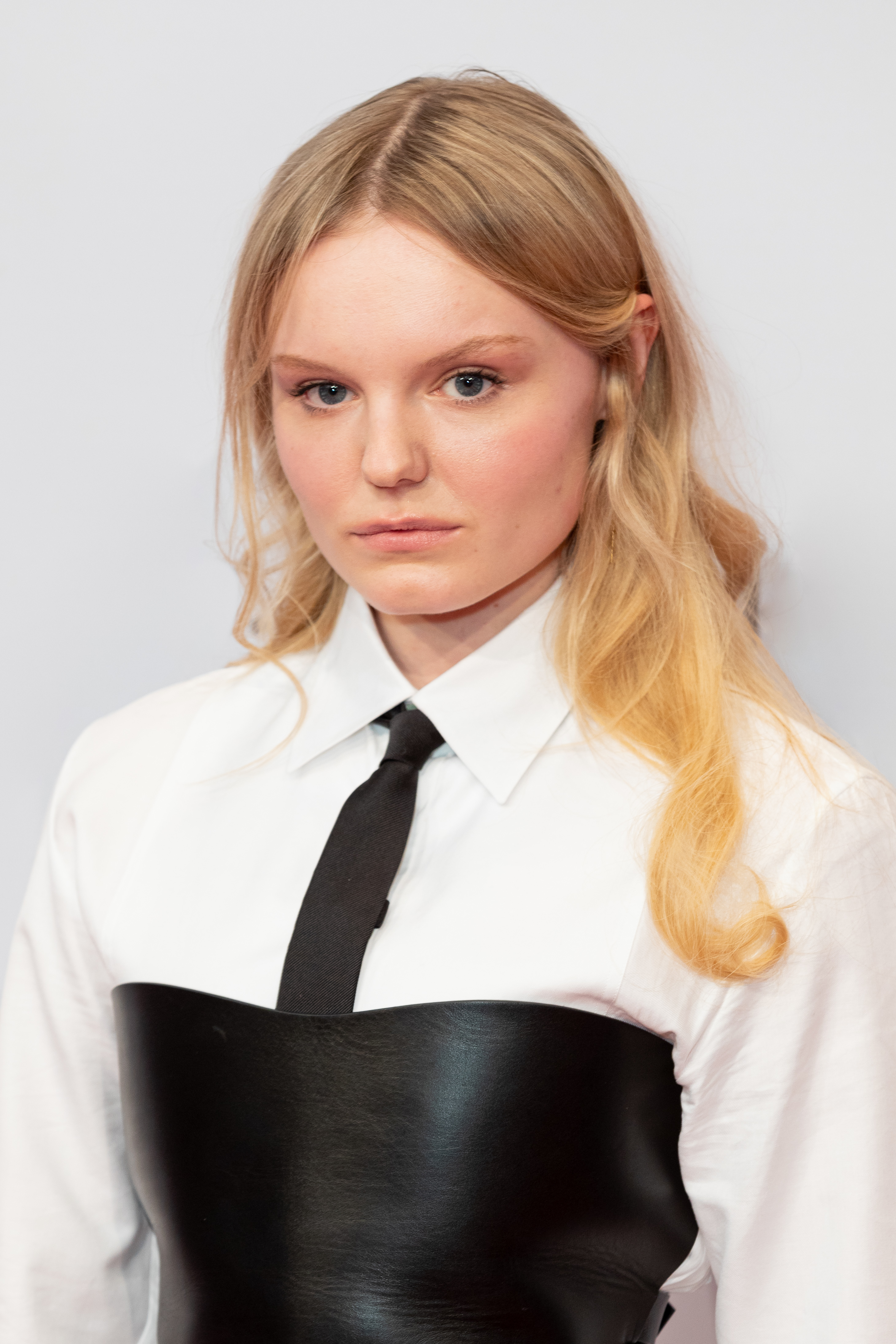
Maria Drăguș

=== Art ===
- Mona Ardeleanu, painter
- Adrian Ghenie, painter
- Petre Hârtopeanu (1913–2001), painter
- Diet Sayler, painter and sculptor
- George Ștefănescu (1914–2007), painter

=== Entertainment ===
- Fred Costea, actor, comedian
- Mircea Crișan (1924–2013), actor, comedian
- Maria Drăguș, actress
- Marc Dumitru, actor and musician
- Alexandra Maria Lara, actress
- Al Munteanu, film producer
- Florian Munteanu, actor, best known for his role as Viktor Drago in the drama film Creed II
- Călin Netzer, film director
- Oana Nechiti, dancer and former judge for the reality television show Deutschland sucht den Superstar
- Anny Ogrezeanu, singer, winner of The Voice of Germany in 2022.
- Lupu Pick (1886–1931) film director, producer and screenwriter (Romanian mother)
- Anna Schumacher, actress
- Oana Solomon, actress
- Sabin Tambrea, actor
- Ana Ularu, actress
- Johanna Wokalek, actress

=== Music ===
- 12 Finger Dan, hip hop producer, member of the production duo Soulbrotha
- Ahzumjot, producer and rapper (Romanian mother)
- Amar, rapper, best known for his association with Kool Savas
- Sergiu Celibidache (1912–1996), conductor and composer
- Roger Cicero (1970–2016), jazz and pop musician
- Michael Cretu, music producer, songwriter and founder of Enigma
- Damae, singer, former vocalist of trance group Fragma (Romanian mother)
- Hubert Daviz, hip hop producer
- Alice Francis, singer and composer (Romanian mother)
- Peter Herbolzheimer (1935–2010), jazz trombonist and composer
- Nicolae Herlea (1927–2014), baritone
- Antonio Lucaciu, jazz saxophonist
- Ramona Nerra, singer and songwriter
- Miss Platnum, singer and songwriter
- Michael Radulescu, composer
- Valentin Radutiu, cellist
- Linda Teodosiu, singer and songwriter

=== Politics ===
- Joana Cotar, member of the Alternative for Germany (AfD) party
- Markus Frohnmaier, member of the Alternative for Germany (AfD) party
- Nicolaus Handjery, conservative politician, member of the Reichstag of the German Empire
- Ramona Pop, member of the Alliance '90/The Greens
- Octavian Ursu, member of the Christian Democratic Union

=== Sports ===
- Karim Adeyemi, footballer (Romanian mother)
- Michael Andrei, volleyball player
- Alina Astafei, track and field athlete
- Tim Binder, footballer
- Francis Bugri, footballer (Romanian mother)
- Liviu Călin, basketball coach, who discovered German NBA player Dennis Schröder
- Călin Colesnic, former managing director of the Hispania Racing F1 Team
- Nicolae Firoiu, water polo coach
- Ralph Gunesch, footballer
- Andreas Ivan, footballer
- Petre Ivănescu, handball coach
- Simone Laudehr, football player (Romanian mother)
- Mihai Leu, professional boxer
- Elena Leonte, handball player
- Stelian Moculescu, volleyball coach
- Maximilian Nicu, footballer
- Liviu-Dieter Nisipeanu, chess grandmaster
- Dragoș Oprea, handballer
- Gerhard Poschner, footballer
- Josef Posipal, footballer, member of Germany's 1954 FIFA World Cup winning team
- Denis Radovan, professional boxer and IBF European Middleweight Champion
- Marcel Răducanu, footballer
- Dennis Seimen, footballer
- Albert Streit, footballer
- Romy Tarangul, judoka
- Monica Theodorescu, equestrian
- Andreas Toba, artistic gymnast
- Alexandra Wenk, swimmer (Romanian mother)
- Luminita Zaituc, long-distance runner
- Tom Bischof, footballer (of Banat Swabian descent)
- Christopher Lannert, footballer
- Eric Porstner, footballer

=== Other ===
- Cornel Chiriac (1941–1975), journalist, radio producer and jazz drummer
- Ricarda Ciontoș, curator and production manager
- Ruxandra Constantinescu, biophysicist
- Eugen Coșeriu (1921–2002), linguist
- Miriam Davoudvandi, music journalist
- Pavel Fyodorovich Keller (1883–1980), officer of the Imperial Russian Navy (submariner, Captain 1st rank) and of the Romanian Land Forces(intelligence colonel)
- Georg Maurer (1907–1971), poet
- Paul Miron (1926–2008), linguist. The first professor of Romanian language and literature in West Germany
- Vlad Mugur (1927–2001), theater director
- Ion Petrovici, neurologist
- Adriana Popescu, writer
- Nicolaus Sombart (1923–2008), sociologist
- Catalin Voss, entrepreneur

== See also ==
- Germany–Romania relations
- Romanian diaspora
- Immigration to Germany
- Germans of Romania
- Romanii din Germania: Experiente, Sfaturi si Conexiuni
