= Ricarda =

Ricarda is a German feminine given name and may refer to:

- Ricarda Budke (born 1999), German politician
- Ricarda Ciontos (born 1968), German actress
- Ricarda Funk (born 1992), German slalom canoeist
- Ricarda Haaser (born 1993), Austrian skier
- Ricarda Huch (1864–1947), German intellectual
- Ricarda Lang (born 1994), German politician
- Ricarda Lima (born 1970), Brazilian volleyballer
- Ricarda Lisk (born 1981), German triathlete
- Ricarda Lobe (born 1994), German hurdler
- Ricarda Multerer (born 1990), German épée fencer
- Ricarda Walkling (born 1997), German footballer

== See also ==
- Riccarda Dietsche (born 1996) is a Swiss athlete
- Riccarda Mazzotta (born 1986), Swiss racing cyclist
- Ricciarda Malaspina (1497–1553), Italian noblewoman
- Ricciarda of Saluzzo (1410–1474), Italian noblewoman
- 879 Ricarda, minor planet
- Ričardas, Lithuanian cognate of Richard
- Ricarda Jordan, pen name of German novelist Christiane Gohl

__EXPECTSHORTPAGE__
