= Yevhen Bokhashvili =

Ukrainian footballer

Personal information
- Full name: Yevhen Oleksandrovych Bokhashvili
- Date of birth: 5 January 1993 (age 33)
- Place of birth: Dnipropetrovsk, Ukraine
- Height: 1.82 m (6 ft 0 in)
- Position: Forward

Youth career
- 2007–2010: Dnipro

Senior career*
Years	Team	Apps	(Gls)
2010–2016	Dnipro	4	(0)
2012	→ Kryvbas Kryvyi Rih (loan)	0	(0)
2013–2014	→ Karpaty Lviv (loan)	15	(1)
2014	→ Volyn Lutsk (loan)	1	(0)
2015	→ Volyn Lutsk (loan)	2	(0)
2016	→ Naftovyk Okhtyrka (loan)	10	(3)
2017	Rukh Vynnyky	21	(8)
2018	Torpedo Kutaisi	10	(1)
2018	Minsk	14	(4)
2019–2021	PSS Sleman	36	(17)
2021	Sri Pahang	10	(1)
2021–2022	Persipura Jayapura	26	(8)
2022	Nam Dinh	1	(0)
2022	Oțelul Galați	8	(0)
2023	PSS Sleman	24	(6)
2023–2024	Sriwijaya	6	(1)
2024	Persikas Subang	5	(0)

International career
2010	Ukraine U17	1	(0)
2011	Ukraine U18	4	(2)
2011–2012	Ukraine U19	10	(0)
2012	Ukraine U20	1	(0)
2013	Ukraine U21	5	(0)
- * Club domestic league appearances and goals as of 27 October 2024

Yevhen Oleksandrovych Bokhashvili (Ukrainian: Євген Олександрович Бохашвілі, Georgian: ევგენ ბოხაშვილი; born 5 January 1993) is a Ukrainian professional footballer who plays as a forward.

== Club career ==
He is product of Dnipro sportive school. He went to play for half-year on loan for the Ukrainian Premier League's club Karpaty Lviv in June 2013.

=== PSS Sleman ===
On 28 February 2019, Bokhashvili moved to Indonesia and joined Liga 1 side PSS Sleman on free transfer. Bokhashvili made his PSS Sleman debut in a pre-season friendly against Badak Lampung on 27 April. and his league debut on 15 may, he made his debut by starting in a 3–1 win against Arema, and in the second half, he finally scored his first goal for PSS, with a curling shot in the 57th minute.

On 17 February 2021, Bokhashvili moved to Malaysia for joined Malaysia Super League club and officially no longer joins as a PSS player. Previously, he had sent a letter of resignation to the club's management and at the same time explained the reasons for leaving PSS. He contributed with 17 goals in 36 appearances during two season with PSS Sleman.

=== Sri Pahang ===
On 17 February 2021, Bokhashvili moved to Malaysia and joined Malaysia Super League side Sri Pahang on free transfer. and he made his league debut for Sri Pahang on 6 March in a lost 3–1 against Selangor. On 16 March, Bokhashvili scored his first goal for Sri Pahang in a 2–1 victory over Sabah at the Darul Makmur Stadium.

=== Persipura Jayapura ===
In 2021, Bokhashvili signed for Persipura Jayapura to play in 2021 Liga 1. On 28 August, Bokhashvili made his league debut by starting in a 1–2 lost at Persita Tangerang.

On 11 January 2022, Bokhashvili scored his first goal for Persipura in a 2–1 victory over Persija Jakarta at the Kapten I Wayan Dipta Stadium. On 6 February, he scored a brace for the club in a 2–0 away win against Persebaya Surabaya. On 5 March, Bokhashvili scored from a penalty kick, opening the scoring in a 1–1 draw over Persikabo 1973. He made 26 league appearances with Persipura Jayapura and scored eight goals.

=== Nam Dinh ===
In July 2022, Bokhashvili signed for Nam Dinh to play in 2022 V.League 1. On 29 July 2022, Bokhashvili made his club debut in a 1–0 lose against SHB Da Nang.

=== ASC Oțelul Galați ===
In September 2022, Bokhashvili decided to Europe and signed a contract with Romanian Liga II club ASC Oțelul Galați. Bokhashvili made his club debut on 3 September in a 1–0 win against SSU Politehnica Timișoara, he coming on as a substitutes for George Cârjan before match ended. Bokhashvili made just 10 league appearances with just one assist. In the Cupa României, Bokhashvili played five times, 4 times as a starter and 1 came out as a substitute. He made 2 goals and 1 assist.

=== Return to PSS Sleman ===
On 10 January 2023, Bokhashvili decided to sign a contract with his former club since 2019, PSS Sleman. He made his club debut on 21 January, coming on as a starter, also scored his first goal in 34th minute in a 2–0 win against RANS Nusantara. He scored the winning goal in a 2–0 over Arema on 26 January and scored a brace for the club in a 1–2 away win over PS Barito Putera five days later. On 13 February, Bokhashvili scored in a 4–2 lose against Persebaya Surabaya at Gelora Joko Samudro Stadium.

=== Persikas Subang ===
On 29 July 2024, he was officially introduced by Persikas Subang as a new recruit for the 2024–25 Liga 2 season. Yevhen himself is the first foreign player in history to join the club.

== Honours ==
=== Club ===
FC Torpedo Kutaisi

- Georgian Super Cup: 2018
