= Rafael Garutti =

Brazilian footballer (born 1998)

Personal information
- Full name: Rafael Gomes Garutti
- Date of birth: 25 November 1998 (age 27)
- Place of birth: Marília, Brazil
- Height: 1.90 m (6 ft 3 in)
- Position: Centre-back

Youth career
- –2013: Osvaldo Cruz
- 2014–2017: Marília
- 2017: Vasco da Gama

Senior career*
Years	Team	Apps	(Gls)
2018	Marília		
2019	Santacruzense	9	(1)
2019–2021	União Almeirim	27	(3)
2021–2024	Mioveni	43	(1)
2021–2023	→ Corvinul Hunedoara (loan)		
2025	Voluntari	13	(0)
2025–2026	Unirea Slobozia	0	(0)
- * Club domestic league appearances and goals as of 9 December 2025

Rafael Gomes Garutti (born 25 November 1998) is a Brazilian professional footballer who plays as a centre-back.

== Personal life ==
His brother, Guilherme, is also a centre-back and plays in Romania.

== Honours ==
Corvinul Hunedoara

- Liga III: 2021–22, 2022–23
