= Catalin Voss =

German inventor and entrepreneur (born 1995)

- Born: 1995 (age 30–31); Heidelberg, Germany
- Education: Stanford University
- Occupations: Entrepreneur; co-founder & CTO of Ello Technology, Inc.
- Known for: Inventor, Founder

Catalin Voss is a German-born inventor and entrepreneur. Voss is considered a pioneer in applying artificial intelligence and machine learning for societal impact in areas such as childhood literacy, Autism, financial inclusion in emerging economies, and the criminal justice system.

He is currently the co-founder and CTO of Ello, an AI-powered reading tutor for children.

== Early life and education ==
Catalin Voss was born in Heidelberg, Germany. At the age of 12, when the Apple iPhone was released for the first time, Voss taught himself iOS development and launched a podcast and online tutorials about iPhone app development which attracted over 200,000 viewers.

At age 15, Voss caught the attention of Steve Capps, one of the creators of the original Apple Macintosh, who offered him an internship working on mobile app development at PayNearMe. With Capps, he helped to design, develop, and co-launch the mobile payment platform, and was kept on by CEO Danny Shader as a software engineer.

Voss graduated with honors from Stanford University in 2016 with a B.S. and M.S. in Computer Science and a specialization in Artificial Intelligence. Voss enrolled in Stanford’s PhD program in Artificial Intelligence, but has been on leave since 2020 to co-found Ello.

== Sension ==
While still an undergraduate student at Stanford, Voss founded Sension, a computer vision startup. Sension developed advanced facial motion capture technology that could be used for a variety of applications from driver monitoring systems to educational analytics, but the original purpose of the technology was to track student engagement during online courses. Voss served as CEO of Sension and led the development of the company's core technology.

In 2015, Sension was acquired by GAIA Systems Solutions, a Toyota-affiliated company, for an undisclosed amount.

== Autism Glass ==
While working on the facial recognition technology for Sension, Voss realized that emerging technology–which could identify emotions–would be helpful for his Autistic cousin. Voss shared with the NY Times how his cousin used to practice making facial expressions in the mirror to learn to recognize emotions With Terry Winograd and Dennis Wall, Voss founded the Autism Glass Project to develop a wearable AI system that could provide real-time social cues to children with ASD. The system used machine learning algorithms to analyze facial expressions and provide visual and auditory feedback to the wearer through a heads-up display. Children would wear Google Glasses which would provide information to the wearer about the emotions expressed by people around them.

In 2016, Voss and his team published a paper at the IEEE Winter Conference on Applications of Computer Vision (WACV) describing their approach, which won the best paper award.

Over the next several years, the Autism Glass system was evaluated in a series of clinical trials at Stanford Medical School which found that children who used the device showed significant improvements in their social skills and ability to recognize emotions.

In 2018, the intellectual property for the Autism Glass system was licensed to Cognoa, a pediatric behavioral health company.

== DukaConnect ==
In 2017, Voss co-founded DukaConnect, a Nairobi-based startup that developed a low-cost, computer vision-based point of sale system for small retailers in Kenya which used a smartphone camera to automatically recognize products and record sales, eliminating the need for barcode scanners. DukaConnect’s mission was to harness the power of technology to help small business owners in Kenya focus on what matters to grow their businesses sustainably. In 2018, Mastercard acquired DukaConnect for an undisclosed amount and integrated the technology into its Lab for Financial Inclusion in Nairobi.

== Project Recon ==
As a PhD student at Stanford, Voss co-led a project called "Project Recon" that used natural language processing to analyze racial disparities in parole hearing transcripts in California. Voss and his team collected and analyzed over 35,000 parole hearing transcripts from the California Department of Corrections and Rehabilitation (CDCR).

When the CDCR refused to release certain data on inmate race and attorney representation, citing privacy concerns, Voss and his team sued the CDRC to gain access to the data. In 2021, a California Superior Court judge ruled in Voss's favor, ordering the CDCR to release the requested data.

== Ello ==
In 2020, Voss co-founded (with Tom Sayer and Elizabeth Adams) Ello, an AI-powered reading tutor for children, and currently serves as its CTO.

Ello's stated mission is to maximize the potential of every child by providing access to high-quality, personalized reading instruction.

In the summer of 2023, Ello raised a $15.5 million Series A funding round, led by Project A and Goodwater Capital; other funders include Netflix founder Reed Hastings, Ravensburger, and Y Combinator.

In the fall of 2023, Ello was named one of the top 10 AI products for ethical and responsible AI practices by Common Sense Media.

In January 2024, Ello released an all-digital version of the product, which includes a library of over 700 decodable books which align with the Science of Reading. Dr. Tim Shanahan, literacy expert from the University of Illinois at Chicago, joined Ello as an advisor as this shift occurred.

Ello's core technology is a speech recognition model, trained on over 130,000 hours of child speech, that analyzes children's speech in real-time.

== Personal life ==
Voss lives in San Francisco with his fiancee, Ruby.

== List of awards ==
- 2019 Google PhD Fellowship
- 2016 Lemelson-MIT Graduate Student Prize
- 2016 Stanford Kennedy Thesis Prize for Best Honors Thesis in Engineering and Applied Sciences
- 2016 Forbes 30 Under 30 (youngest listed, at age 20)
- 2014 Business Insider 40 under 40

== Patents ==
- US10835167B2, Voss, Catalin; HABER, Nicholas Joseph & Wall, Dennis Paul et al., "Systems and methods for using mobile and wearable video capture and feedback plat-forms for therapy of mental disorders", issued 2020-11-17
- US20240071185A1, Voss, Catalin, "Mobile device platform for automated visual retail product recognition", issued 2024-02-29
- US9626701B2, Capps, Stephen P.; Minor, John Paul & Voss, Catalin, "System and method for facilitating cash payment transactions using a mobile device", issued 2017-04-18
- US9892315B2, Voss, Catalin & HABER, Nicholas Joseph, "Systems and methods for detection of behavior correlated with outside distractions in examinations", issued 2018-02-13
- WO2022140166A1, VOSS, Catalin; SAYER, Thomas Robert & Nag, Anish, "Systems and methods for speech validation", issued 2022-06-30
