= Dennis Wallace Watson =

Canadian-American professor (1914–2008)

Dennis Wallace Watson (April 29, 1914, Morpeth, Ontario – December 1, 2008, Saint Paul, Minnesota) was a Canadian-American professor of microbiology. He was the president of the American Society for Microbiology (ASM) in 1969.

== Biography ==
Watson graduated in 1934 with a bachelor's degree from the University of Toronto and in 1937 with an M.Sc. from Dalhousie University. During his years as a graduate student at Dalhousie, he was also employed as an assistant by the Biological Board of Canada. From 1937 to 1938 he worked for the Fisheries Research Board of Canada, where he studied the bacteriology of fish spoilage. In 1938 he went to the United States. In 1941 he graduated from the University of Wisconsin with a Ph.D. in bacteriology. His Ph.D. thesis is entitled The biological and physical properties of tuberculin constituents. At the University of Wisconsin, Watson was from 1941 to 1942 a research fellow and a research associate in agricultural biology. In 1942 he was a visiting assistant at the Rockefeller Institute for Medical Research. From 1942 to 1944 he worked in Toronto at the Connaught Laboratories. From 1944 to 1946, he worked on the development of a typhus vaccine for the U.S. Army in the United States biological weapons program.

In 1946 Watson became a naturalized U.S. citizen. From 1946 to 1949 he was an assistant professor in agricultural biology at the University of Wisconsin. In the department of microbiology of the University of Minnesota Medical School, he became in 1949 an associate professor and then became a full professor, retiring in 1984 as professor emeritus. From 1964 to 1984 he was the head of the department. He served as director of the Minneapolis War Memorial Blood Bank.

At the University of Minnesota, Watson did research on several diseases, but his discoveries about endotoxin shock might be his most important and fundamental work. He also did research on host-parasite relationships.

Watson was elected in 1953 a fellow of the American Association for the Advancement of Science. Upon his retirement in 1984, some of his former students established the Dennis W. Watson Fellowship for University of Minnesota graduate students in microbiology and immunology.

He married in 1941. His wife died in 2001. They had a daughter, Catherine, and a son, William. Upon his death in 2008 at the age of 94, Dennis W. Watson was survived by his two children, five grandchildren, and three great-grandchildren. His son William (who died in 2020) was for many years a professor of world history in the department of social sciences of Colorado Christian University.

== Selected publications ==
- Havens, Walter P.; Watson, Dennis W.; Green, Robert H.; Lavin, George I.; Smadel, Joseph E. (1943). "Complement Fixation with the Neurotropic Viruses". Journal of Experimental Medicine. 77 (2): 139–153. doi:10.1084/jem.77.2.139. PMC 2135322. PMID 19871270.
- Cromartie, William J.; Bloom, Walter L.; Watson, Dennis W. (1947). "Studies on Infection with Bacillus anthracis: I. A Histopathological Study of Skin Lesions Produced by B. anthracis in Susceptible and Resistant Animal Species". The Journal of Infectious Diseases. 80 (1): 1–13. doi:10.1093/infdis/80.1.1. JSTOR 30089238. PMID 20341537.
- Cromartie, William J.; Watson, Dennis W.; Bloom, Walter L.; Heckly, Robert J. (1947). "Studies on Infection with Bacillus anthracis: II. The Immunological and Tissue Damaging Properties of Extracts Prepared from Lesions of B. anthracis Infection". The Journal of Infectious Diseases. 80 (1): 14–27. doi:10.1093/infdis/80.1.14. JSTOR 30089239. PMID 20283795.
- Watson, Dennis W.; Cromartie, William J.; Bloom, Walter L.; Kegeles, Gerson; Heckly, Robert J. (1947). "Studies on Infection with Bacillus anthracis: III. Chemical and Immunological Properties of the Protective Antigen in Crude Extracts of Skin Lesions of B. anthracis". The Journal of Infectious Diseases. 80 (1): 28–40. doi:10.1093/infdis/80.1.28. JSTOR 30089240. PMID 20283797.
- Watson, D. W.; Brandly, C. A. (1949). "Virulence and Pathogenicity". Annual Review of Microbiology. 3: 195–220. doi:10.1146/annurev.mi.03.100149.001211.
- Skarnes, Robert C.; Watson, Dennis W. (1956). "Characterization of Leukin: An Antibacterial Factor from Leucocytes Active Against Gram-Positive Pathogens". Journal of Experimental Medicine. 104 (6): 829–845. doi:10.1084/jem.104.6.829. PMC 2136653. PMID 13376807.
- Skarnes, Robert C.; Watson, Dennis W. (1957). "Antimicrobial Factors of Normal Tissues and Fluids". Bacteriological Reviews. 21 (4): 273–294. doi:10.1128/br.21.4.273-294.1957. PMC 180916. PMID 13488885.
- Watson, Dennis W. (1960). "Host-Parasite Factors in Group a Streptococcal Infections". Journal of Experimental Medicine. 111 (2): 255–284. doi:10.1084/jem.111.2.255. PMC 2137249. PMID 13783427.
- Watson, Dennis W.; Kim, Yoon Berm (1963). "Modification of Host Responses to Bacterial Endotoxins". Journal of Experimental Medicine. 118 (3): 425–446. doi:10.1084/jem.118.3.425. PMC 2137653. PMID 14078002.
- Kim, Yoon Berm; Watson, Dennis W. (1970). "A Purified Group a Streptococcal Pyrogenic Exotoxin". Journal of Experimental Medicine. 131 (3): 611–628. doi:10.1084/jem.131.3.611. PMC 2138823. PMID 4905084.
- Galanos, Chris; Rietschel, Ernst T.; Luderitz, Otto; Westphal, Otto; Kim, Yoon B.; Watson, Dennis W. (1972). "Biological Activities of Lipid a Complexed with Bovine-Serum Albumin". European Journal of Biochemistry. 31 (2): 230–233. doi:10.1111/j.1432-1033.1972.tb02524.x. PMID 4567119.
- Barsumian, E. L.; Schlievert, P. M.; Watson, D. W. (1978). "Nonspecific and specific immunological mitogenicity by group a streptococcal pyrogenic exotoxins". Infection and Immunity. 22 (3): 681–688. doi:10.1128/iai.22.3.681-688.1978. PMC 422214. PMID 365764.
