= Mario Mitoi =

Romanian footballer

Personal information
- Full name: Mario Cristian Mitoi
- Date of birth: 13 August 2004 (age 22)
- Place of birth: Pitești, Romania
- Height: 1.79 m (5 ft 10 in)
- Position: Right winger

Youth career
- 2010–2014: LPS Viitorul Pitești
- 2014–2016: Școala de Fotbal Dănuț Coman
- 2014–2015: → Academica Argeș (loan)
- 2016–2018: Atletic Bradu
- 2018–2022: Argeș Pitești

Senior career*
Years	Team	Apps	(Gls)
2021–2024	Argeș Pitești	4	(0)
2022–2023	→ Oțelul Galați (loan)	25	(1)
2024	AFC Câmpulung Muscel	3	(1)
- * Club domestic league appearances and goals as of 23 November 2024

Mario Cristian Mitoi (born 13 August 2004) is a Romanian professional footballer who plays as a right winger.

== Career statistics ==
=== Club ===
As of match played 23 November 2024

Appearances and goals by club, season and competition
Club	Season	League			National Cup (Note: Includes Cupa României)		Europe		Other (Note: Appearances in Supercupa României)		Total	
Club	Season	Division	Apps	Goals	Apps	Goals	Apps	Goals	Apps	Goals	Apps	Goals
Argeș Pitești	2020–21	Liga I	1	0	0	0	—		—		1	0
Argeș Pitești	2023–24	Liga II	3	0	1	0	—		—		4	0
Argeș Pitești	Total		4	0	1	0	–		–		5	0
Oțelul Galați (loan)	2022–23	Liga II	25	1	2	1	—		—		27	2
AFC Câmpulung Muscel	2024–25	Liga II	3	1	—		—		—		3	1
Career total			32	2	3	1	—		0	0	35	3
