= Dan Panait =

Romanian footballer

Personal information
- Full name: Dan Lucian Panait
- Date of birth: 16 February 1997 (age 29)
- Place of birth: Brăila, Romania
- Height: 1.74 m (5 ft 9 in)
- Position: Defender

Youth career
- Luceafărul Brăila
- –2017: Gheorghe Hagi Academy

Senior career*
Years	Team	Apps	(Gls)
2017–2019	Viitorul Constanța	0	(0)
2017	→ ASA Târgu Mureș (loan)	20	(2)
2018–2019	→ Concordia Chiajna (loan)	12	(1)
2019	→ Chindia Târgoviște (loan)	11	(0)
2019–2021	Farul Constanța	29	(0)
2021–2022	FC Brașov	1	(0)
2022–2024	Oțelul Galați	22	(0)
2025–2026	Bihor Oradea	16	(0)

International career
2013–2014	Romania U17	6	(0)
2015	Romania U18	1	(0)
2015–2016	Romania U19	7	(0)
- * Club domestic league appearances and goals as of 14 December 2025

Dan Lucian Panait (born 16 February 1997) is a Romanian professional footballer who plays as a defender.

== Honours ==
Chindia Târgoviște

- Liga II: 2018–19

Oțelul Galați

- Cupa României runner-up: 2023–24
