= Guilherme Garutti =

Brazilian footballer (born 1994)

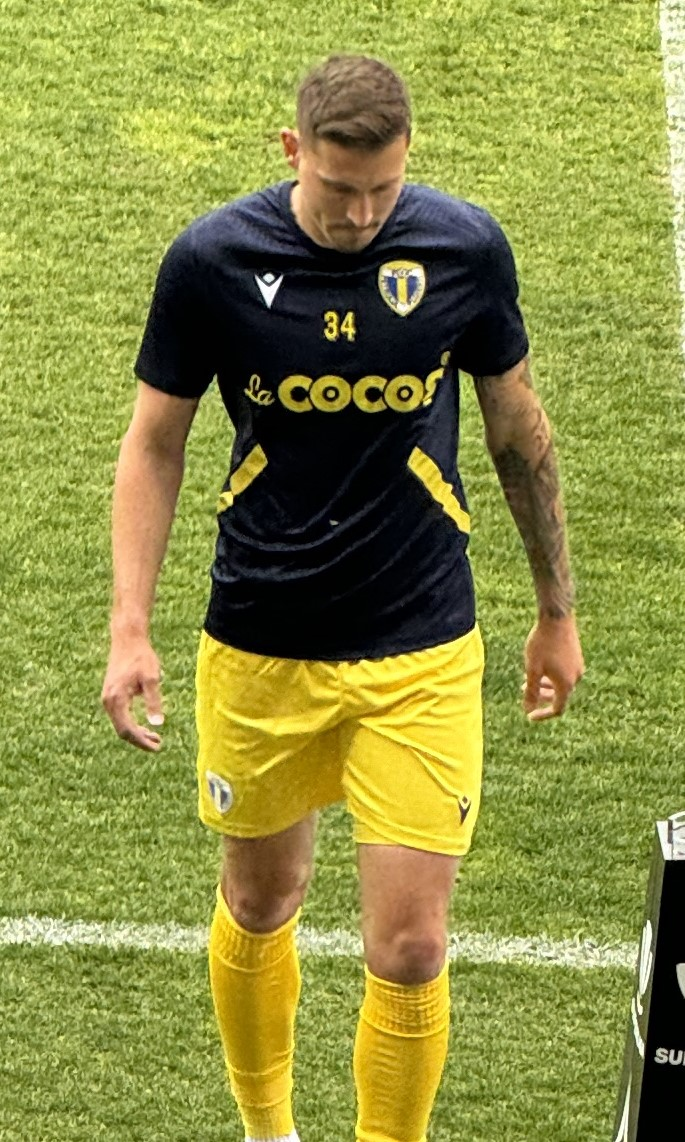
- Garutti with Petrolul Ploiești in 2024

Personal information
- Full name: Guilherme Gomes Garutti
- Date of birth: 8 March 1994 (age 32)
- Place of birth: Marília, Brazil
- Height: 1.94 m (6 ft 4 in)
- Position: Centre-back

Team information
- Current team: Argeș Pitești
- Number: 15

Youth career
- Marília

Senior career*
Years	Team	Apps	(Gls)
2011	Marília	0	(0)
2012	Linense		
2013–2016	Guarani	6	(0)
2014	→ Lemense (loan)	3	(0)
2016	→ Barretos (loan)	12	(0)
2016	Montijo	12	(1)
2017	Oeste	15	(1)
2018	Anapolina	15	(1)
2018	São Caetano	0	(0)
2019	Portuguesa	6	(1)
2020	Aparecidense	6	(0)
2020	Sertãozinho	3	(0)
2020–2023	Mioveni	83	(5)
2023–2024	Petrolul Ploiești	12	(0)
2024–	Argeș Pitești	58	(1)
- * Club domestic league appearances and goals as of 6 November 2026

Guilherme Gomes Garutti (born 8 March 1994) is a Brazilian professional footballer who plays as a centre-back for Liga I club Argeș Pitești.

== Career ==
=== Brazil ===
From his first senior season in 2011 with his hometown club Marília to 2020, Garutti competed in the Brazilian lower leagues and changed sides on numerous occasions.

=== Romania ===
Garutti moved abroad for the first time by joining Romanian Liga II team Mioveni in September 2020. He aided with 18 appearances and three goals in his first season in the country, as his side achieved promotion to the Liga I via play-offs.

On 2 August 2021, Garutti recorded his top division debut in a 2–1 away win over Sepsi OSK, and on 23 October that year scored his first goal in a 1–1 home draw with Botoșani.

On 15 June 2023, following Mioveni's relegation, Garutti continued in Romania and its Liga I by signing for Petrolul Ploiești.

== Personal life ==
Garutti and his partner Bianca have two children together, a girl and a boy. His brother, Rafael, is also a centre-back, who played in Romania.

== Career statistics ==
As of 6 November 2026

Appearances and goals by club, season and competition
Club	Season	League			State league (Note: Includes Campeonato Paulista Série A2, Campeonato Goiano)		National cup (Note: Includes Copa do Brasil, Copa Paulista, Cupa României)		Continental		Other		Total	
Club	Season	Division	Apps	Goals	Apps	Goals	Apps	Goals	Apps	Goals	Apps	Goals	Apps	Goals
Marília	2011	Campeonato Brasileiro Série C	0	0	0	0	—		—		—		0	0
Linense	2012	Campeonato Paulista	—		?	?	—		—		—		?	?
Guarani	2013	Campeonato Brasileiro Série C	0	0	0	0	—		—		—		0	0
Guarani	2015	Campeonato Brasileiro Série C	0	0	0	0	—		—		—		0	0
Guarani	2016	Campeonato Brasileiro Série C	0	0	6	0	—		—		—		6	0
Guarani	Total		0	0	6	0	—		—		—		6	0
Lemense (loan)	2014	Campeonato Paulista Segunda Divisão	—		3	0	—		—		—		3	0
Barretos (loan)	2016	Campeonato Paulista Série A2	—		12	0	—		—		—		12	0
Montijo	2015—16	AF Setúbal 1ª Divisão	12	1	—		—		—		—		12	1
Oeste	2017	Campeonato Brasileiro Série B	1	0	14	1	2	0	—		—		17	1
Anapolina	2018	Campeonato Goiano	—		15	1	—		—		—		15	1
São Caetano	2018	Campeonato Paulista	—		—		4	0	—		—		4	0
Portuguesa	2019	Campeonato Paulista Série A2	—		6	1	8	0	—		—		14	1
Aparecidense	2020	Campeonato Goiano	—		6	0	—		—		—		6	0
Sertãozinho	2020	Campeonato Paulista Série A2	—		3	0	—		—		—		3	0
Mioveni	2020–21	Liga II	16	3	—		1	0	—		2 (Note: Appearances in Liga I promotion/relegation play-offs)	0	19	3
Mioveni	2021–22	Liga I	34	1	—		1	0	—		—		35	1
Mioveni	2022–23	Liga I	33	1	—		3	0	—		—		36	1
Mioveni	Total		83	5	—		5	0	—		2	0	90	5
Petrolul Ploiești	2023–24	Liga I	12	0	—		1	0	—		—		13	0
Petrolul Ploiești	2024–25	Liga I	0	0	—		—		—		—		0	0
Petrolul Ploiești	Total		12	0	—		1	0	—		—		13	0
Argeș Pitești	2024–25	Liga II	26	0	—		3	0	—		—		29	0
Argeș Pitești	2021–22	Liga I	22	1	—		5	0	—		—		27	1
Argeș Pitești	2026–27	Liga I	10	0	—		2	0	—		—		12	0
Argeș Pitești	Total		58	1	—		10	0	—		—		68	1
Career total			166	7	65	3	30	0	—		2	0	263	10

== Honours ==
Argeș Pitești

- Liga II: 2024–25
