= Octavian Ursu =

Romanian-German politician

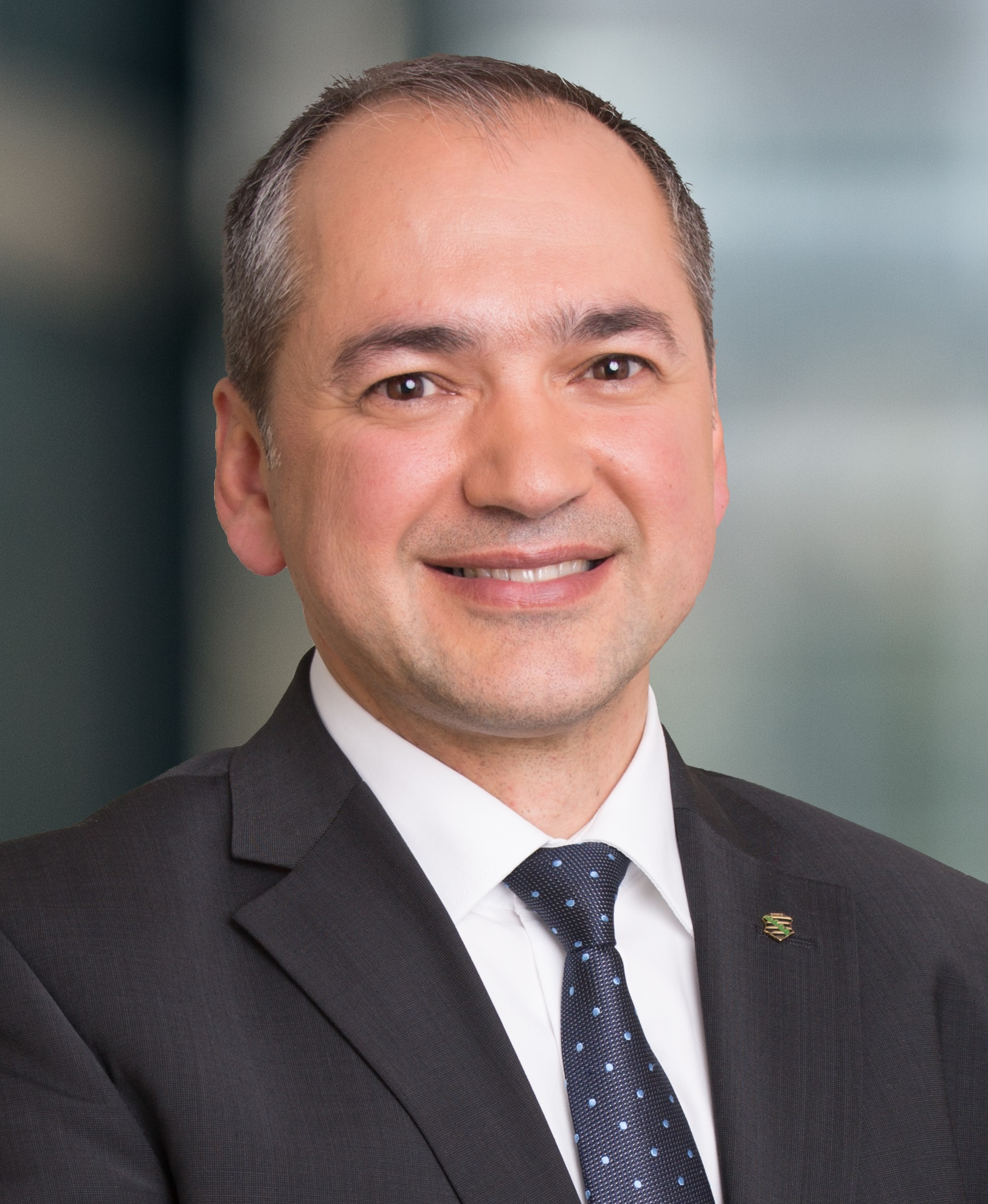

Mayor of Görlitz
- Incumbent
- Assumed office June 2019
- Parliamentary group: Christian Democratic Union

Member of the Landtag of Saxony
- Incumbent
- Assumed office 2014
- Constituency: Görlitz

Personal details
- Born: 27 October 1967 (age 59) Bucharest, Socialist Republic of Romania

Octavian Ursu (born 27 October 1967) is a Romanian-German politician for the Christian Democratic Union and mayor of Görlitz since June 2019.

== Life ==
Ursu was born in Bucharest in Socialist Republic of Romania (now Romania) and graduated from the National University of Music Bucharest in 1986. He was the solo trumpeter of the Neuen Lausitzer Philharmonie. He is married, has two children and is an Orthodox Christian.

Running with the Christian Democratic Union, Ursu was elected as a representative of Görlitz in the 2014 Saxony state election and in June 2019, he was elected mayor of Görlitz. Although the far-right Alternative for Germany (AfD) party won the most votes and seats on the council, other parties united in a coalition behind Ursu. Ursu has opposed plans to end the Polish–German cooperation at a marketplace in Görlitz where traders of various nationalities, such as Poles, Czechs, Indians, Pakistanis and Vietnamese, sell goods. The AfD wants these traders to be evicted to make more space for German sellers.
