= Vanja Marković =

Serbian footballer (born 1994)

Personal information
- Full name: Vanja Marković
- Date of birth: 20 June 1994 (age 32)
- Place of birth: Belgrade, Serbia
- Height: 1.85 m (6 ft 1 in)
- Position: Defensive midfielder

Team information
- Current team: Kluczevia Stargard
- Number: 23

Youth career
- Zemun
- –2011: VVV-Venlo
- 2011–2012: Partizan

Senior career*
| Years | Team | Apps | (Gls) |
| 2013–2017 | Korona Kielce | 67 | (2) |
| 2017–2018 | Vardar | 22 | (0) |
| 2018–2019 | Farense | 20 | (0) |
| 2019 | Kaposvári Rákóczi | 1 | (0) |
| 2020 | Torpedo Kutaisi | 11 | (0) |
| 2021 | Sloboda Tuzla | 3 | (0) |
| 2021 | Persiraja Banda Aceh | 17 | (0) |
| 2022 | Ruch Chorzów | 13 | (0) |
| 2022–2023 | Oțelul Galați | 11 | (1) |
| 2023 | Hrvatski Dragovoljac | 11 | (0) |
| 2023–2024 | Sham Shui Po | 7 | (0) |
| 2025– | Kluczevia Stargard | 21 | (1) |

International career
| 2012 | Serbia U19 | 1 | (0) |
- * Club domestic league appearances and goals as of 22:32, 3 June 2026 (UTC)

Vanja Marković (Serbian Cyrillic: Вања Марковић; born 20 June 1994) is a Serbian professional footballer who plays as a defensive midfielder for Polish III liga club Kluczevia Stargard.

== Club career ==
After joining Portuguese club Farense in July 2018, Marković left the club by mutual agreement on 13 March 2019. After Farense, he played in Hungary for Kaposvári Rákóczi and in Georgia for Torpedo Kutaisi.

On 11 February 2021, Marković signed with Bosnian Premier League club Sloboda Tuzla. He debuted in a league game against Olimpik on 8 March 2021.

In June 2021, he moved to Persiraja Banda Aceh in the Indonesian Liga 1. He made his professional debut for the club, in a 2–1 loss against Bhayangkara on 29 August 2021.

On 15 February 2022, Marković returned to Poland, signing a half-a-year deal with a two-year extension option with II liga side Ruch Chorzów.

On 8 October 2023, Marković joined Sham Shui Po.

== International career ==
Marković made an appearance for the Serbia under-19 national team in 2012.

== Personal life ==
His twin brother, Ivan Marković, is also a professional footballer, playing for Indian club Thrissur Magic.

== Honours ==
Kluczevia Stargard

- Polish Cup (West Pomerania regionals): 2025–26

Kluczevia Stargard II

- Klasa A West Pomerania V: 2025–26
