= Mihăescu =

Mihăescu is a Romanian surname that may refer to:

- Eugen Mihăescu (born 1937), Romanian painter and politician
- Gib Mihăescu (1894–1935), Romanian prose writer and playwright
- Iulian Mihăescu (born 1962), Romanian footballer
- Mădălin Mihăescu (born 1988), Romanian footballer
- Mugur Mihăescu (born 1967), Romanian actor and politician
- Haralambie Mihăescu (1907–1985), Romanian philologist
- Vintilă Mihăescu (born 1943), Romanian artist
