= Ricarda Ciontos =

Ricarda Ciontoș (born 28 June 1968) is a German actress, curator, production manager and an artistic director of NORDWIND Platform and Festival in Berlin since 2005, where she lives and works.

== Education ==
Ricarda Ciontoș studied at the University of Music and Performing Arts in Saarbrücken from 1998 to 2001. During this time, she also worked at the theatre at Josefstadt in Vienna.

== Career ==
From 1996 to 1998, Ciontos performed as an actress at the Salzburger Festspiele. This was followed by various positions in Vienna, Mannheim, Magdeburg, Berlin, Tbilisi and Bucharest prior to 2005. She worked with directors such as Gábor Tompa, Otar Egadze, Þorleifur Örn Arnarsson, Eberhard Köhler, Alexander Waechter, Andrei Serban and Vladimir Sorokin.

In 2005, she started NORDWIND Platform and Festival, which has since become one of the biggest presentations of Nordic art in Germany. The festival assembles around 300 artists from Scandinavia, the Baltic States, Russia and other countries each year, depending on the thematic focus, with audience numbers of up to 18 000 and partners in Berlin, Hamburg, Dresden, Bern, Helsinki, Oslo, Moscow, Stockholm, Copenhagen, New York and Tallinn.

Apart from her activity as a curator, Ciontos works as a lecturer and mentor for the PAP (Performing Arts Program) program and for the international qualification program "Women in Leadership Positions" of the Viadrina European University in Frankfurt/Oder. Since 2016 she is associate producer for Future Perfect Productions, an agency for contemporary art in New York City.

== Personal life ==
Ciontos has Romanian roots, and in addition to Romanian and German, she speaks English, French and Italian. In an interview with Berlin Art & Culture, Ciontos described actors James Dean, Bette Davis, and Gena Rowlands to be her biggest cultural idols.
