= George Cârjan =

Romanian footballer

Personal information
- Date of birth: 7 November 1988 (age 38)
- Place of birth: Galați, Romania
- Height: 1.80 m (5 ft 11 in)
- Position: Forward

Team information
- Current team: Oțelul Galați (delegate)

Youth career
- –2008: Oțelul Galați

Senior career*
Years	Team	Apps	(Gls)
2008–2009	Oțelul II Galați	22	(10)
2009–2012	Dunărea Galați	76	(20)
2012–2014	Botoșani	53	(14)
2014–2015	Ceahlăul Piatra Neamț	22	(3)
2015–2016	Oțelul Galați	12	(2)
2016	FCM Baia Mare	6	(0)
2017–2024	Oțelul Galați	154	(50)
Total		345	(99)

Managerial career
- 2024–: Oțelul Galați (delegate)
- * Club domestic league appearances and goals

George Cârjan (born 7 November 1988) is a former Romanian footballer who played as a forward, currently delegate at Liga I club Oțelul Galați.

== Club career ==
Cârjan made his Liga I debut on 21 July 2013 for Botoșani, in a 0-0 draw against CFR Cluj. In his career he played also for clubs such as: Dunărea Galați, Botoșani, Ceahlăul Piatra Neamț or Baia Mare.

== Honours ==
Oțelul Galați

- Liga III: 2020–21, 2021–22
- Cupa României runner-up: 2023–24
