= 2023–24 ASC Oțelul Galați season =

Oțelul Galați
2023–24 season
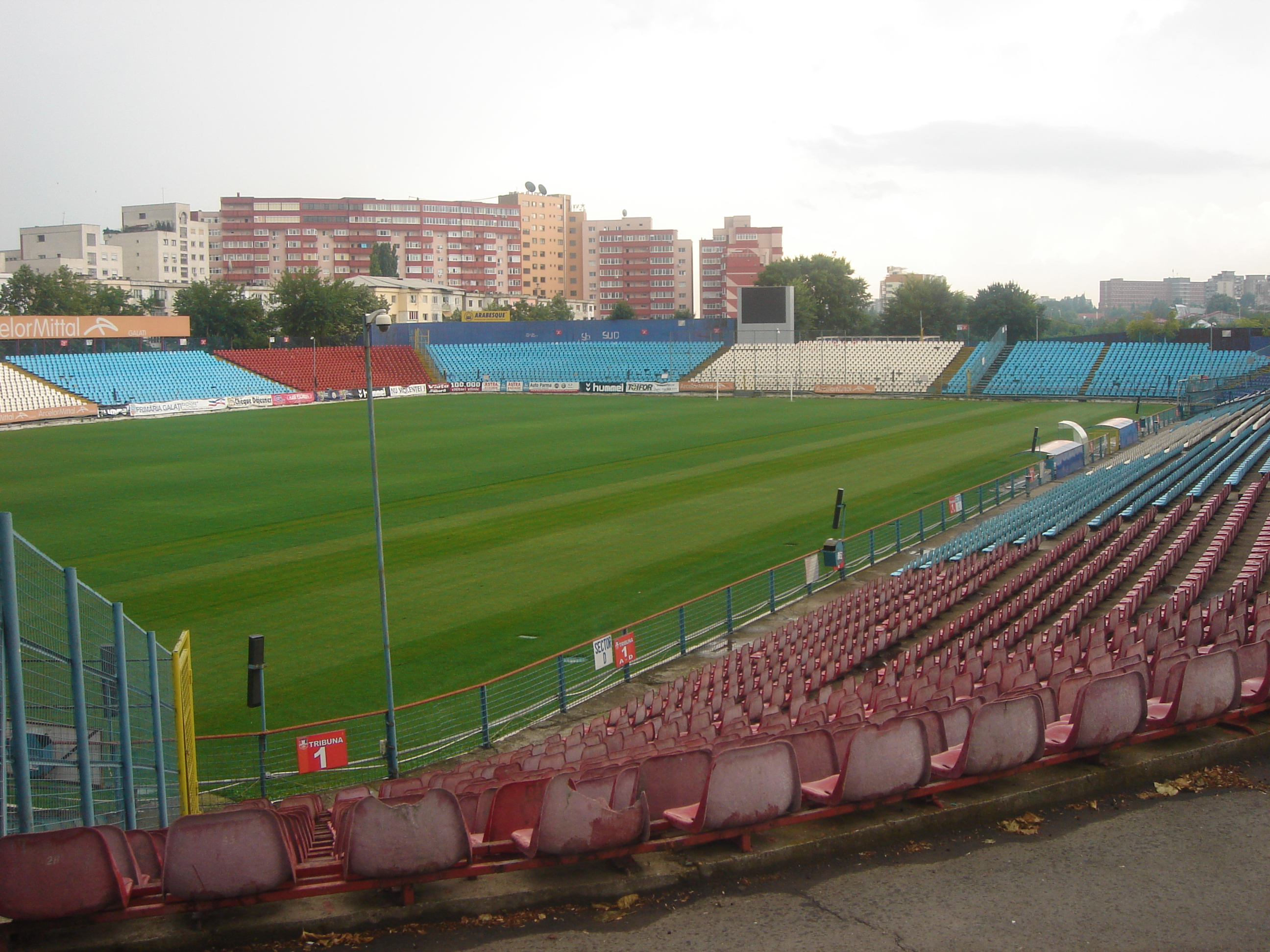
- Oțelul stadium is used as the season's home ground
- Chairman: Cristian Munteanu
- Head coach: Dorinel Munteanu
- Stadium: Oțelul
- Liga I: 8th
- Cupa României: Runners-up
- Top goalscorer: League: Alexandru Pop (11); All: Alexandru Pop (11)
- Highest home attendance: 12,897 vs FCSB (29 July 2023)
- Lowest home attendance: 3,820 vs Sepsi OSK (12 December 2023)
- Average home league attendance: 7,025
- Biggest win: Home: Oțelul Galați 2–0 FC Botoșani; Away: SCM Zalău 1–4 Oțelul Galați
- Biggest defeat: Home: Oțelul Galați 0–2 FCSB; Away: Hermannstadt 4–1 Oțelul Galați
| Home colours | Away colours | Third colours |
- All statistics correct as of 17 June 2024.

The 2023–24 season was Oțelul Galați's first season back in the Liga I since the 2014–15 season. In addition to the Superliga, Oțelul participated in this season's edition of Cupa României.

== Overview ==
Oțelul ended the previous season by winning promotion to the Liga I after placing 3rd in the Liga II Play-offs. The preparation for the new season started in early June in Galati, followed by a training camp in Vatra Dornei between 10th and 18 June, followed by a series of friendlies during a camp in Mönichkirchen, between 25 of June and July 6. The first match of the season was a 1–1 draw against UTA.

== Players ==
=== Transfers ===
==== In ====
| No. | Pos. | Nat. | Name | Age | EU | Moving from | Type | Transfer window | Ends | Transfer fee | Source |
|---|---|---|---|---|---|---|---|---|---|---|---|
| 11 | CF | (Argentina) | Alexandru Pop | 23 | EU | Unirea Dej | Transfer | Summer | June 2025 | Undisclosed | |
| 12 | GK | (Romania) | Relu Stoian | 27 | EU | Gloria Buzău | Transfer | Summer | June 2024 | Free | |
| 20 | AM | (Romania) (Moldova) | Ștefan Bodișteanu | 20 | EU | Farul | Loaned-in | Summer | June 2024 | Undisclosed | |
| 55 | GK | (Romania) | Aurelian Păun | 22 | EU | U Cluj | Transfer | Summer | June 2024 | Free | |
| 5 | CB | (Uruguay) | Ariel Ignacio López Varela | 28 | EU | Gloria Buzău | Transfer | Summer | June 2024 | Free | |
| 27 | CM | (Argentina) | Pablo Gaitán | 31 | Non-EU | Gloria Buzău | Transfer | Summer | June 2024 | Free | |
| 2 | RB | (Bulgaria) | Milen Zhelev | 29 | EU | Arda Kardzhali (Bulgaria) | Transfer | Summer | June 2024 | Free | |
| 4 | CB | (Portugal) | João Pedro Pereira Serrão | 23 | EU | U.S.C. Paredes (Portugal) | Transfer | Summer | June 2024 | Free | |
| 21 | DM | (Portugal) | Samuel Teles | 26 | EU | C.D. Feirense (Portugal) | Transfer | Summer | June 2024 | Free | |
| 17 | AM | (Romania) | Răzvan Andrei Tănasă | 20 | EU | Farul | Loaned-in | Summer | June 2024 | Undisclosed | |
| 67 | RW | (Portugal) | Frédéric Maciel | 29 | EU | S.C.U. Torreense (Portugal) | Transfer | Summer | Undisclosed | Free | |
| 25 | CB | (Croatia) | Dragan Lovrić | 27 | EU | FC Ararat-Armenia | Transfer | Summer | June 2024 | Free | |
| 6 | CB | (Ivory Coast) | Jonathan Cissé | 26 | Non-EU | Hapoel Hadera (Israel) | Transfer | Summer | June 2024 | Free | |
| 28 | LB | (Portugal) | Miguel Silva | 27 | EU | Leixões (Portugal) | Transfer | Summer | June 2024 | Undisclosed | |
| 95 | LB | (Martinique) (France) | Rosario Latouchent | 27 | EU | Kauno Žalgiris (Lithuania) | Transfer | Summer | June 2024 | Undisclosed | |
| 18 | LB | (Romania) | Iustin Neacșu | 19 | EU | U Cluj | Loaned-in | Summer | January 2024 | Undisclosed | |
| 9 | ST | (Serbia) | Anes Rušević | 27 | Non-EU | FC Zhetysu (Kazakhstan) | Transfer | Winter | June 2025 | Free | |
| 19 | RW | (Mali) | Aly Mallé | 25 | Non-EU | Eyüpspor (Turkey) | Transfer | Winter | June 2024 | Free | |
| 66 | DM | (Portugal) | João Lameira | 24 | EU | Baltika Kaliningrad (Russia) | Loaned-in | Winter | June 2024 | Undisclosed | |
| 94 | GK | (Romania) | Eduard Pap | 29 | EU | ETO FC Győr (Hungary) | Transfer | Winter | June 2024 | Free | |
| 3 | RB | (Romania) | Claudio Mocanu | 19 | EU | CS Universitatea II Craiova | Transfer | Winter | June 2024 | Free | |

==== Out ====
| No. | Pos. | Nat. | Name | Age | EU | Moving to | Type | Transfer window | Transfer fee | Source |
|---|---|---|---|---|---|---|---|---|---|---|
| 17 | CM | (Romania) | Mario Mitoi | 18 | EU | FC Argeș | Loan ended | Summer | | |
| 21 | LW | (Romania) | Laurențiu Maxim | 19 | EU | CSM Reșița | Loan ended | Summer | | |
| 6 | DM | (Romania) | Rareș Scocîlcă | 19 | EU | Unirea Dej | Loan ended | Summer | | |
| 9 | CF | (Romania) | Andreas Chirițoiu | 19 | EU | Progresul Spartac | Loan ended | Summer | | |
| 20 | CM | (Romania) | Antonio Cruceru | 26 | EU | Metaloglobus | Mutual | Summer | | |
| 27 | RW | (Romania) | Cristian Ciobanu | 28 | EU | CSM Focsani 2007 | Mutual | Summer | | |
| 99 | GK | (Romania) | Rareș Pop | 24 | EU | Unirea Dej | Mutual | Summer | | |
| | GK | (Romania) | Darius Paharnicu | 18 | EU | CS Unirea Braniştea | Loaned-out | Summer | Undisclosed | |
| 19 | LW | (Romania) | Răzvan Gorovei | 29 | EU | CSM Focsani 2007 | Mutual | Summer | | |
| 3 | LB | (Romania) | Gabriel Nedelea | 23 | EU | CSM Alexandria | Loan ended | Summer | | |
| 77 | RW | (Romania) | Octavian Ursu | 28 | EU | Chindia Târgoviște | Mutual | Summer | | |
| 55 | GK | (Romania) | Aurelian Păun | 22 | EU | Progresul Spartac | Mutual | Summer | | |
| 18 | RB | (Romania) | Ștefan Farcaș | 20 | EU | CS Unirea Braniştea | Loaned-out | Summer | Undisclosed | |
| | LW | (Romania) | Alin Nica | 25 | EU | CS Unirea Braniştea | Loaned-out | Summer | Undisclosed | |
| 95 | LB | (Martinique) (France) | Rosario Latouchent | 27 | EU | Villefranche (France) | Released | Winter | Free | |
| 4 | CB | (Portugal) | João Pedro Pereira Serrão | 23 | EU | Felgueiras (Portugal) | Released | Winter | Free | |
| 9 | FW | (Bulgaria) | Iliya Dimitrov | 27 | EU | Unirea Slobozia | Released | Winter | Free | |
| 5 | CB | (Uruguay) | Ariel Ignacio López Varela | 28 | EU | UTA Arad | Released | Winter | Free | |
| 90 | ST | (Nigeria) | Kehinde Fatai | 33 | EU | Larissa (Greece) | Released | Winter | Free | |

EU = if holds or not a European Union passport; Country: when 2 flags, 1st flag = country that plays for internationally, 2nd flag = country of birth; N = number on jersey; P = Position (for position name, pause mouse pointer on abbreviation); Name = Name on jersey (for more extensive name, pause mouse pointer on name); Age = age on the day of the signing; Moving from = only indicate the club the player was playing before start playing for this club in this season, for the type of the moving see Status column; Moving to = only indicates the club the player is going to play next, for the type of the moving see Status column; Ends = when the player's current contract ends; n/a = Not applicable.

== Player statistics ==
=== Squad statistics ===
| | | | | Total | | | Liga I | | Cupa României | | Others^{1} | |
| No. | Pos. | Nat. | Name | Sts | App | Gls | App | Gls | App | Gls | App | Gls |
|---|---|---|---|---|---|---|---|---|---|---|---|---|
| 2 | RB | (Bulgaria) | Zhelev | 40 | 42 | | 35 | | 7 | | | |
| 3 | LB | (Romania) | Gabriel Nedelea | | | | | | | | | |
| 5 | CB | (Uruguay) | Ariel López | 19 | 22 | 2 | 18 | | 4 | 2 | | |
| 6 | CB | (Ivory Coast) | Cissé | 32 | 32 | 5 | 26 | 2 | 5 | 3 | 1 | |
| 7 | CF | (Romania) | Cârjan | 3 | 24 | 3 | 21 | 1 | 3 | 2 | | |
| 8 | DM | (Romania) | Neagu | 4 | 18 | | 16 | | 2 | | | |
| 9 | ST | (Bulgaria) | Dimitrov | 2 | 4 | | 3 | | 1 | | | |
| 9 | ST | (Serbia) | Rušević | 9 | 18 | 3 | 14 | 1 | 3 | 2 | 1 | |
| 11 | CF | (Romania) | A. Pop | 33 | 40 | 11 | 36 | 11 | 4 | | | |
| 12 | GK | (Romania) | Stoian | 13 | 13 | | 12 | | 1 | | | |
| 13 | GK | (Romania) | Dur-Bozoancă | 17 | 17 | | 14 | | 3 | | | |
| 14 | RB | (Romania) | Andrei Rus | 4 | 16 | | 13 | | 2 | | 1 | |
| 15 | CB | (Burkina Faso) | Yabré | 24 | 25 | 1 | 20 | 1 | 4 | | 1 | |
| 16 | LB | (Romania) | Costin Ghiocel | 10 | 13 | | 10 | | 3 | | | |
| 17 | AM | (Romania) | Răzvan Tănasă | 13 | 36 | 1 | 29 | 1 | 6 | | 1 | |
| 18 | RB | (Romania) | Sțefan Farcaș | | 1 | | 1 | | | | | |
| 19 | RW | (Romania) | Mallé | 4 | 17 | | 13 | | 3 | | 1 | |
| 20 | LW | (Romania) | Bodișteanu | 30 | 41 | 2 | 34 | 2 | 6 | | 1 | |
| 21 | DM | (Portugal) | Teles | 31 | 41 | 4 | 34 | 3 | 6 | 1 | 1 | |
| 22 | LB | (Romania) | Panait | 3 | 5 | | 5 | | | | | |
| 23 | DM | (Moldova) | Jardan | 9 | 24 | | 22 | | 2 | | | |
| 25 | CB | (Croatia) | Lovrić | 23 | 23 | | 22 | | 1 | | | |
| 26 | AM | (Romania) | Mihai Adăscăliței | 20 | 31 | 1 | 26 | | 4 | 1 | 1 | |
| 27 | CM | (Argentina) | Gaitán | 2 | 5 | 1 | 3 | 1 | 1 | | 1 | |
| 28 | LB | (Romania) | Miguel Silva | 28 | 33 | | 26 | | 6 | | 1 | |
| 30 | LW | (Italy) | Cisotti | 41 | 44 | 10 | 36 | 9 | 7 | 1 | 1 | |
| 31 | DM | (Croatia) | Živulić | 23 | 43 | | 35 | | 7 | | 1 | |
| 66 | DM | (Portugal) | Lameira | 16 | 21 | 2 | 17 | 1 | 3 | 1 | 1 | |
| 67 | RW | (Portugal) | Maciel | 36 | 43 | 7 | 35 | 7 | 7 | | 1 | |
| 77 | RW | (Romania) | Ursu | 1 | 2 | | 2 | | | | | |
| 90 | ST | (Nigeria) | Fatai | 7 | 21 | 1 | 18 | 1 | 3 | | | |
| 94 | GK | (Romania) | Pap | 17 | 17 | | 13 | | 3 | | 1 | |
| 95 | LB | (Romania) | Latouchent | 3 | 9 | 1 | 7 | | 2 | 1 | | |

Last updated: 17 June 2024
Source: official website
Ordered by player name
0 shown as blank
^{1} Other Competitions: Liga 1 European Play-off

=== Start formations ===
| Qnt | Formation | Match(es) |
|---|---|---|
| 34 | 4-3-3 | |
| 11 | 4-1-2-3 | |
| 2 | 4-1-4-1 | |

Last updated: 17 June 2024
Source: Match reports in Matches
Only competitive matches.

== Club ==
=== Technical staff ===
| Position | Staff |
|---|---|
| Head coach | (Romania) Dorinel Munteanu |
| Assistant coach 1 | (Romania) Sorin Haraga |
| Assistant coach 2 | (Romania) Dorin Toma |
| Goalkeeping coach | (Romania) Iulian Olteanu |
| Club doctor | (Romania) Bogdan Băneșanu |
| Masseur | (Romania) Constantin Crăciun |
| Fitness coach | (Romania) Laurențiu Iorga |
| Physiotherapist | (Romania) Alexandru Popa |
| Kinetotherapist | (Romania) Liviu Tunariu |
| Video analyst | (Romania) Nic Constandache |
| Storeman | (Romania) Iulian Dogaru |

Last updated: 10 October 2023
Source: LPF.ro

== Competitions ==
=== Overall ===
| | Total | Home | Away |
|---|---|---|---|
| Games played | 47 | 23 | 24 |
| Games won | 16 | 8 | 8 |
| Games drawn | 20 | 9 | 11 |
| Games lost | 11 | 6 | 5 |
| Biggest win | 4–1 vs. SCM Zalău | 2–0 vs. FC Botoșani | 4–1 vs. SCM Zalău |
| Biggest loss | 1–4 vs. Hermannstadt | 0–2 vs. FCSB | 1–4 vs. Hermannstadt |
| Clean sheets | 16 | 9 | 7 |
| Goals scored | 58 | 22 | 36 |
| Goals conceded | 54 | 23 | 31 |
| Goal difference | 4 | -1 | 5 |
| Average GF per game | 1.23 | 0.96 | 1.5 |
| Average GA per game | 1.15 | 1 | 1.29 |
| Yellow cards | 119 | 43 | 76 |
| Red cards | 5 | 4 | 1 |
| Most appearances | (Italy) Cisotti (44) | | |
| Most minutes played | (Italy) Cisotti (3857) | | |
| Top scorer | (Romania) A. Pop (11) | | |
| Top assister | (Romania) Bodișteanu (6) | | |
| Points | 68/141 (48.23%) | 33/69 (47.83%) | 35/72 (48.61%) |
| Winning rate | 34.04% | 34.78% | 33.33% |

Last updated: 17 June 2024
Source: Matches

=== SuperLiga ===
==== League table ====
| Pos | Team | Pld | W | D | L | GF | GA | GD | Pts | Qualification |
|---|---|---|---|---|---|---|---|---|---|---|
| 9 | Hermannstadt | 30 | 9 | 13 | 8 | 36 | 31 | +5 | 40 (Note: Head to head points: UTA 3 (+1), Hermannstadt 3 (-1)) | Qualification to play-out round |
| 10 | Petrolul Ploiești | 30 | 7 | 14 | 9 | 29 | 32 | −3 | 35 | Qualification to play-out round |
| 11 | Oțelul Galați | 30 | 6 | 16 | 8 | 31 | 36 | −5 | 34 | Qualification to play-out round |
| 12 | Politehnica Iași | 30 | 7 | 12 | 11 | 33 | 44 | −11 | 33 | Qualification to play-out round |
| 13 | FC U Craiova | 30 | 9 | 4 | 17 | 43 | 50 | −7 | 31 | Qualification to play-out round |

Source: , Soccerway
Rules for classification: 1) Points; 2) Head-to-head points; 3) Head-to-head goal difference; 4) Head-to-head goals scored; 5) Goal difference; 6) Goals scored; 7) Play-off.

==== Results summary ====
| Overall | | | | | | | | Home | | | | | | Away | | | | | |
| Pld | W | D | L | GF | GA | GD | Pts | W | D | L | GF | GA | GD | W | D | L | GF | GA | GD |
|---|---|---|---|---|---|---|---|---|---|---|---|---|---|---|---|---|---|---|---|
| 39 | 12 | 17 | 10 | 42 | 43 | −1 | 53 | 7 | 8 | 5 | 19 | 19 | 0 | 5 | 9 | 5 | 23 | 24 | −1 |

Last updated: 17 June 2024.
Source: Matches

==== Results by round ====
| Round | 1 | 2 | 3 | 4 | 5 | 6 | 7 | 8 | 9 | 10 | 11 | 12 | 13 | 14 | 15 | 16 | 17 | 18 | 19 | 20 | 21 | 22 | 23 | 24 | 25 | 26 | 27 | 28 | 29 | 30 | 31 | 32 | 33 | 34 | 35 | 36 | 37 | 38 | 39 |
|---|---|---|---|---|---|---|---|---|---|---|---|---|---|---|---|---|---|---|---|---|---|---|---|---|---|---|---|---|---|---|---|---|---|---|---|---|---|---|---|
| Ground | H | A | H | A | H | A | H | A | H | A | H | H | A | H | A | A | H | A | H | A | H | A | H | A | H | A | A | H | A | H | H | A | H | A | H | A | H | A | H |
| Result | D | D | L | D | D | D | D | D | D | W | W | L | D | D | D | W | L | W | L | W | L | D | D | L | W | L | D | D | L | D | W | W | W | D | W | L | W | L | W |
| Position | 7 | 11 | 13 | 12 | 13 | 13 | 13 | 12 | 12 | 10 | 8 | 9 | 9 | 10 | 11 | 8 | 9 | 9 | 11 | 10 | 11 | 10 | 10 | 12 | 10 | 11 | 11 | 11 | 11 | 11 | 11 | 9 | 9 | 8 | 7 | 9 | 8 | 8 | 8 |

Updated to match(es) played on 17 June 2024. Source: Matches
A = Away; H = Home; W = Win; D = Draw; L = Loss

==== Points by opponent ====
| Team | Results | | | | Points |
| Team | Regular | | Play-out | | Points |
| Team | Home | Away | Home | Away | Points |
|---|---|---|---|---|---|
| CFR Cluj | 2–2 | 0-0 | | | 2 |
| Craiova 1948 | 1–0 | 2-0 | | 2-1 | 9 |
| Dinamo | 1–0 | 1-3 | 1–0 | | 6 |
| Farul | 0–1 | 1-1 | | | 1 |
| FC Botoșani | 0–2 | 0-0 | 2–0 | | 4 |
| FCSB | 0–2 | 2-0 | | | 3 |
| Hermannstadt | 1–1 | 1-4 | 1–0 | | 4 |
| Petrolul | 0–0 | 2-2 | | 1-2 | 2 |
| Poli Iasi | 1–1 | 1-1 | 1–0 | | 5 |
| Rapid | 0–0 | 1-2 | | | 1 |
| Sepsi | 2–3 | 1-1 | | | 1 |
| U Cluj | 1–1 | 1-0 | 1–0 | | 7 |
| U Craiova | 1–3 | 0-0 | | | 1 |
| UTA | 1–1 | 4-2 | | 1-3 | 4 |
| Voluntari | 2–2 | 1-1 | | 1-1 | 3 |

Source: SCOG

==== Matches ====
| 14 July 2023 Matchday 1 | Oțelul Galați | 1–1 | UTA Arad | Galați |
| 18:30 EEST (UTC+03) | A. Pop 62'; Zhelev (yellow card) 69'; Andrei Rus (yellow card) 84' | (Report) | R. Pop 45+5'; Cristian Mihai (yellow card) 57'; Isac (yellow card) 75' | Stadium: Oțelul; Attendance: 8,010; Referee: Andrei Chivulete |

| 24 July 2023 Matchday 2 | Universitatea Craiova | 0–0 | Oțelul Galați | Craiova |
| 21:30 EEST (UTC+03) | Borța (yellow card) 14'; Căpățînă (yellow card) 31'; Mitriță (yellow card) 90+5' | (Report) | Zhelev (yellow card) 45'; Cisotti (yellow card) 50'; Stoian (yellow card) 90+3' | Stadium: Ion Oblemenco; Attendance: 11,826; Referee: Ovidiu Hațegan |

| 29 July 2023 Matchday 3 | Oțelul Galați | 0–2 | FCSB | Galați |
| 21:30 EEST (UTC+03) | Jardan (yellow card) 45+2'; Andrei Rus (yellow card) 90+3' | (Report) | Oct. Popescu 40'; Compagno 90+1', (yellow card) 70'; Pantea (yellow card) 67' | Stadium: Oțelul; Attendance: 12,897; Referee: Iulian Dima |

| 7 August 2023 Matchday 4 | Sepsi OSK | 1–1 | Oțelul Galați | Sfântu Gheorghe |
| 18:30 EEST (UTC+03) | Šafranko 85'; Varga (yellow card) 34'; Oteliță (yellow card) 62'; Dumitrescu (yellow card) 71' | (Report) | A. Pop 4'; Cisotti (yellow card) 51'; Cârjan (yellow card) 55'; Răzvan Tănasă (yellow card) 67' | Stadium: Sepsi Arena; Attendance: 3,460; Referee: Viorel Flueran |

| 12 August 2023 Matchday 5 | Oțelul Galați | 1–1 | Universitatea Cluj | Galați |
| 18:30 EEST (UTC+03) | A. Pop 59'; Ariel López (yellow card) 47'; Stoian (yellow card) 89' | (Report) | Nistor 90' (pen.); Perianu (yellow card) 64'; Miron (yellow card) 77' | Stadium: Oțelul; Attendance: 8,285; Referee: Horia Mladinovici |

| 19 August 2023 Matchday 6 | FC Botoșani | 0–0 | Oțelul Galați | Botoșani |
| 17:00 EEST (UTC+03) | Iulian Cărăușu (yellow card) 20'; Pius (yellow card) 45+6'; Pinson (yellow card) 59'; David (yellow card) 66' | (Report) | Mihai Adăscăliței (yellow card) 30'; A. Pop (yellow card) 45+3'; Cârjan (yellow card) 45+9'; Ariel López (yellow card) 64' | Stadium: Municipal; Attendance: 1,604; Referee: Szabolcs Kovacs |

| 25 August 2023 Matchday 7 | Oțelul Galați | 2–2 | Voluntari | Galați |
| 18:30 EEST (UTC+03) | Cisotti 28' (pen.); A. Pop 41'; Ariel López (yellow card) 78' | (Report) | Dumiter 77'; Andreas Niță 80'; Aliji (yellow card) 14'; Rață (yellow card) 31'; Răduț (yellow card) 75'; Paz (yellow card) 88' | Stadium: Oțelul; Attendance: 6,851; Referee: Horațiu Feșnic |

| 1 September 2023 Matchday 8 | Petrolul Ploiești | 2–2 | Oțelul Galați | Ploiești |
| 18:30 EEST (UTC+03) | Jair 30', 53'; Doua (yellow card) 89' | (Report) | Maciel 60'; Cisotti 65'; Teles (yellow card) 69'; Zhelev (yellow card) 61'; Neagu (yellow card) 86'; Živulić (yellow card) 90+1' | Stadium: Ilie Oană; Attendance: 7,100; Referee: Sebastian Colțescu |

| 17 September 2023 Matchday 9 | Oțelul Galați | 0–0 | Rapid București | Galați |
| 19:15 EEST (UTC+03) | Mihai Adăscăliței (yellow card) 21'; Živulić (yellow card) 45+1'; Răzvan Tănasă (yellow card) 74'; Lovrić (yellow card) 83'; Maciel (yellow card) 87'; Miguel Silva (yellow card) 90+6' | (Report) | Emmers (yellow card) 32'; Bamgboye (yellow card) 39'; Iacob (yellow card) 87'; Stan (yellow card) 90+5'; Käit (yellow card) 83' (yellow-red card) 90+7' | Stadium: Oțelul; Attendance: 11,649; Referee: Marian Barbu |

| 22 September 2023 Matchday 10 | U Craiova 1948 | 0–2 | Oțelul Galați | Craiova |
| 18:00 EEST (UTC+03) | Achim (yellow card) 67' | (Report) | Fatai 62'; Bodișteanu 80'; Cisotti (yellow card) 74'; Maciel (yellow card) 60' | Stadium: Craiova Sports Complex; Attendance: 4,080; Referee: Marcel Bîrsan |

| 29 September 2023 Matchday 11 | Oțelul Galați | 1–0 | Dinamo București | Galați |
| 21:00 EEST (UTC+03) | N. Roșu 37' (o.g.); Răzvan Tănasă (yellow card) 59'; Bodișteanu (yellow card) 68'; Jardan (yellow card) 73'; A. Pop (yellow card) 90' (yellow-red card) 90+1' | (Report) | Politic (yellow card) 22'; Lucão (yellow card) 79'; Ghezali (yellow card) 87'; Gabriel Moura (yellow card) 90+3' | Stadium: Oțelul; Attendance: 11,149; Referee: George Găman |

| 8 October 2023 Matchday 12 | Oțelul Galați | 0–1 | Farul Constanța | Galați |
| 16:00 EEST (UTC+03) | | (Report) | Larie 79'; M. Popescu (yellow card) 11' | Stadium: Oțelul; Attendance: 10,686; Referee: Andrei Chivulete |

| 23 October 2023 Matchday 13 | CFR Cluj | 0–0 | Oțelul Galați | Cluj-Napoca |
| 21:00 EEST (UTC+03) | Cvek (yellow card) 77' | (Report) | Cissé (yellow card) 40'; Živulić (yellow card) 81'; Miguel Silva (yellow card) 84'; Zhelev (yellow card) 84' | Stadium: Dr. Constantin Rădulescu; Attendance: 3,870; Referee: Iulian Călin |

| 28 October 2023 Matchday 14 | Oțelul Galați | 1–1 | Hermannstadt | Galați |
| 14:00 EEST (UTC+03) | A. Pop 89' (pen.) | (Report) | Lovrić 70' (o.g.) | Stadium: Oțelul; Attendance: 6,315; Referee: Sebastian Colțescu |

| 3 November 2023 Matchday 15 | Poli Iași | 1–1 | Oțelul Galați | Iași |
| 18:00 EET (UTC+02) | Harrison 31'; Itu (yellow card) 22' | (Report) | Maciel 79'; Miguel Silva (yellow card) 27'; Cissé (yellow card) 45'; Mihai Adăscăliței (yellow card) 45+2'; Zhelev (yellow card) 59'; Latouchent (yellow card) 60'; Ariel López (yellow card) 87' | Stadium: Emil Alexandrescu; Attendance: 4,364; Referee: István Kovács |

| 13 November 2023 Matchday 16 | UTA Arad | 2–4 | Oțelul Galați | Sibiu |
| 20:30 EET (UTC+02) | Căpușă 86'; R. Pop 90+5'; Cristian Mihai (yellow card) 89' | (Report) | Cisotti 3' (pen.), (yellow card) 22'; A. Pop 5', 34'; Teles 54'; Bodișteanu (yellow card) 64' | Stadium: Municipal; Attendance: 1,000; Referee: Radu Petrescu |

| 26 November 2023 Matchday 17 | Oțelul Galați | 1–3 | Universitatea Craiova | Galați |
| 18:30 EET (UTC+02) | A. Pop 20' (pen.); Živulić (yellow card) 62'; Lovrić (yellow card) 82'; Fatai (yellow card) 82' | (Report) | Mitriță 53', 80', 83'; Screciu (yellow card) 19' | Stadium: Oțelul; Attendance: 4,000; Referee: Horațiu Feșnic |

| 3 December 2023 Matchday 18 | FCSB | 0–2 | Oțelul Galați | Bucharest |
| 21:00 EET (UTC+02) | Lixandru (yellow card) 8'; Đoković (yellow card) 90+1'; Coman (yellow card) 58' (yellow-red card) 90+6' | (Report) | Teles 7', (yellow card) 61'; Cisotti 64', (yellow card) 67'; Ariel López (yellow card) 19' | Stadium: Arena Națională; Attendance: 5,723; Referee: Marcel Bîrsan |

| 12 December 2023 Matchday 19 | Oțelul Galați | 2–3 | Sepsi OSK | Galați |
| 17:00 EET (UTC+02) | Maciel 38'; Cârjan 83', (yellow card) 78'; Bodișteanu (yellow card) 30'; Živulić (yellow card) 61' | (Report) | Matei 4', (yellow card) 5'; Ștefănescu 64'; Ciobotariu 75'; Alimi (yellow card) 85'; Niczuly (yellow card) 90+2'; Damașcan (yellow card) 90+3'; Kecskés (yellow card) 90+4'; Ștefan (yellow card) 90+7' | Stadium: Oțelul; Attendance: 3,820; Referee: Marian Barbu |

| 17 December 2023 Matchday 20 | Universitatea Cluj | 0–1 | Oțelul Galați | Cluj-Napoca |
| 15:00 EET (UTC+02) | Doukouré (yellow card) 28'; Simion (yellow card) 54'; Cîmpanu (yellow card) 72'; Ilie (yellow card) 89'; Nistor (yellow card) 90+1' | (Report) | A. Pop 25', (yellow card) 61'; Zhelev (yellow card) 64'; Miguel Silva (yellow card) 68'; Živulić (yellow card) 90+3'; Dur-Bozoancă (yellow card) 90+7' | Stadium: Cluj Arena; Attendance: 6,970; Referee: István Kovács |

| 22 December 2023 Matchday 21 | Oțelul Galați | 0–2 | FC Botoșani | Galați |
| 17:30 EET (UTC+02) | Teles (yellow card) 22'; Andrei Rus (red card) 64' | (Report) | Florescu 66', 90+1'; Gabriel (yellow card) 45+2'; Șeroni (yellow card) 58' | Stadium: Oțelul; Attendance: 4,805; Referee: Bogdan Dumitrache |

| 22 January 2024 Matchday 22 | Voluntari | 1–1 | Oțelul Galați | Voluntari |
| 17:00 EET (UTC+02) | Boboc 80'; Popescu (yellow card) 58' | (Report) | Cissé 11'; Teles (yellow card) 4'; Rušević (yellow card) 61' | Stadium: Anghel Iordănescu; Attendance: 210; Referee: István Kovács |

| 27 January 2024 Matchday 23 | Oțelul Galați | 0–0 | Petrolul Ploiești | Galați |
| 17:00 EET (UTC+02) | Lameira (yellow card) 63'; Bodișteanu (yellow card) 80' | (Report) | Meijers (yellow card) 70'; Ișfan (yellow card) 77' | Stadium: Oțelul; Attendance: 4,410; Referee: Szabolcs Kovacs |

| 3 February 2024 Matchday 24 | Rapid București | 2–1 | Oțelul Galați | Bucharest |
| 20:00 EET (UTC+02) | Rrahmani 8'; Burmaz 45+2'; Đoković (yellow card) 57' | (Report) | Cisotti 87'; Cissé (yellow card) 45' | Stadium: Rapid-Giulești; Attendance: 12,537; Referee: Ionuț Coza |

| 9 February 2024 Matchday 25 | Oțelul Galați | 1–0 | U Craiova 1948 | Galați |
| 17:00 EET (UTC+02) | Bodișteanu 64'; Miguel Silva (yellow card) 87'; Stoian (yellow card) 90+2' | (Report) | Padula (yellow card) 57'; Chițu (yellow card) 60'; Negru (yellow card) 67'; Lekiatas (yellow card) 90+3' | Stadium: Oțelul; Attendance: 4,797; Referee: Horia Mladinovici |

| 18 February 2024 Matchday 26 | Dinamo București | 3–1 | Oțelul Galați | București |
| 20:00 EET (UTC+02) | Politic 3'; Gnahoré 34'; Abdallah 81' (pen.); Amzăr (yellow card) 28'; Gregório (yellow card) 90'; Bordușanu (yellow card) 90+4' | (Report) | A. Pop 17' (pen.); Andrei Rus (yellow card) 66'; Mihai Adăscăliței (yellow card) 72'; Miguel Silva (yellow card) 90+6' | Stadium: Arcul de Triumf; Attendance: 6,862; Referee: Andrei Moroiță |

| 24 February 2024 Matchday 27 | Farul Constanța | 1–1 | Oțelul Galați | Ovidiu |
| 18:00 EET (UTC+02) | Budescu 31' (pen.); Deaconu (yellow card) 19'; Sîrbu (yellow card) 75' | (Report) | Maciel 67'; Miguel Silva (yellow card) 28'; Andrei Rus (yellow card) 45'; Costin Ghiocel (yellow card) 57'; Cissé (yellow card) 90+4' | Stadium: Viitorul; Attendance: 4,029; Referee: Rareș Vidican |

| 27 February 2024 Matchday 28 | Oțelul Galați | 2–2 | CFR Cluj | Galați |
| 21:00 EET (UTC+02) | A. Pop 36'; Cisotti 90+6' (pen.); Mihai Adăscăliței (yellow card) 73'; Costin Ghiocel (yellow card) 83' | (Report) | Otele 45'; Tachtsidis 87' (pen.), (yellow card) 77'; Deac (yellow card) 69' | Stadium: Oțelul; Attendance: 6,237; Referee: Andrei Chivulete |

| 2 March 2024 Matchday 29 | Hermannstadt | 4–1 | Oțelul Galați | Sibiu |
| 18:00 EET (UTC+02) | Ian. Stoica 26', 49'; Paraschiv 44' (pen.); Neguț 86'; Murgia (yellow card) 79'; Rúben Fonseca (yellow card) 84'; Bejan (yellow card) 90+3' | (Report) | Teles 12'; Cissé (yellow card) 25'; Cârjan (yellow card) 82'; Živulić (yellow card) 83' | Stadium: Municipal; Attendance: 6,000; Referee: Szabolcs Kovacs |

| 11 March 2024 Matchday 30 | Oțelul Galați | 1–1 | Poli Iași | Galați |
| 20:00 EET (UTC+02) | Cisotti 71'; Yabré (yellow card) 60' | (Report) | Roman 9' (pen.); Marchioni (yellow card) 26'; Martac (yellow card) 35' | Stadium: Oțelul; Attendance: 4,855; Referee: Iuliana Demetrescu |

| 16 March 2024 Play-out 1 | Oțelul Galați | 1–0 | Poli Iași | Galați |
| 17:00 EET (UTC+02) | Maciel 29'; Cisotti (yellow card) 45+2'; Mihai Adăscăliței (yellow card) 75' | (Report) | Mihai (yellow card) 17'; Buș (yellow card) 90+5' | Stadium: Oțelul; Attendance: 4,522; Referee: Iulian Călin |

| 31 March 2024 Play-out 2 | U Craiova 1948 | 1–2 | Oțelul Galați | Craiova |
| 14:00 EEST (UTC+03) | Bauza 39'; Dragu (yellow card) 27'; Achim (yellow card) 45'; V. Pop (yellow card) 65' | (Report) | Cisotti 17', (yellow card) 90+3'; Cissé 51'; Mihai Adăscăliței (yellow card) 7'; Zhelev (yellow card) 43'; Maciel (yellow card) 77'; Pap (yellow card) 82'; Teles (yellow card) 88'; Miguel Silva (yellow card) 90+5' | Stadium: Craiova Sports Complex; Attendance: 2,169; Referee: Andrei Chivulete |

| 8 April 2024 Play-out 3 | Oțelul Galați | 1–0 | Dinamo București | Galați |
| 20:30 EEST (UTC+03) | Răzvan Tănasă 90+3'; Teles (yellow card) 75'; Cisotti (yellow card) 44'; Lameira (yellow card) 86' | (Report) | Gabriel Moura (yellow card) 21' | Stadium: Oțelul; Attendance: 10,180; Referee: Szabolcs Kovacs |

| 13 April 2024 Play-out 4 | Voluntari | 1–1 | Oțelul Galați | Voluntari |
| 17:00 EEST (UTC+03) | Dumiter 22' | (Report) | Lameira 90+4'; Costin Ghiocel (yellow card) 11'; Răzvan Tănasă (yellow card) 32'; Cârjan (yellow card) 90'; Bodișteanu (yellow card) 90' | Stadium: Anghel Iordănescu; Attendance: 701; Referee: Marian Barbu |

| 21 April 2024 Play-out 5 | Oțelul Galați | 1–0 | Universitatea Cluj | Galați |
| 16:00 EEST (UTC+03) | Maciel 40', (yellow card) 76' (yellow-red card) 87'; Teles (yellow card) 90+4' | (Report) | Chipciu (yellow card) 77' | Stadium: Oțelul; Attendance: 6,461; Referee: Rareș Vidican |

| 25 April 2024 Play-out 6 | UTA Arad | 3–1 | Oțelul Galați | Arad |
| 16:45 EEST (UTC+03) | Omondi 62'; Luckassen 78'; R. Pop 82' | (Report) | Cisotti 90+3', (yellow card) 13'; Mallé (yellow card) 35' | Stadium: Francisc von Neuman; Attendance: 6,212; Referee: Viorel Flueran |

| 28 April 2024 Play-out 7 | Oțelul Galați | 1–0 | Hermannstadt | Galați |
| 13:30 EEST (UTC+03) | Yabré 3'; Živulić (yellow card) 17'; Teles (yellow card) 39' (red card) 54' | (Report) | Bejan (yellow card) 52'; Ion. Stoica (yellow card) 75'; G. Iancu (yellow card) 83'; Neguț (yellow card) 90' | Stadium: Oțelul; Attendance: 4,583; Referee: Andrei Antonie |

| 5 May 2024 Play-out 8 | Petrolul Ploiești | 2–1 | Oțelul Galați | Ploiești |
| 15:30 EEST (UTC+03) | Grozav 11' (pen.); Berisha 80', (yellow card) 82'; Zima (yellow card) 36'; Papp (yellow card) 86' | (Report) | Maciel 40'; Pap (yellow card) 10'; Lameira (yellow card) 67' | Stadium: Ilie Oană; Attendance: 3,874; Referee: Horia Mladinovici |

| 12 May 2024 Play-out 9 | Oțelul Galați | 2–0 | FC Botoșani | Galați |
| 21:30 EEST (UTC+03) | Gaitán 12'; Rušević 45'; Costin Ghiocel (yellow card) 65' | (Report) | Dican (yellow card) 34'; Benzar (yellow card) 45+2'; Ariel López (yellow card) 82' | Stadium: Oțelul; Attendance: 5,979; Referee: Marian Petrescu |

==== European play-offs ====
| 19 May 2024 Semi-final | Oțelul Galați | 0–2 | Universitatea Cluj | Galați |
| 14:30 EEST (UTC+03) | Teles (yellow card) 36'; Yabré (yellow card) 86' | | Anselmo 62', 73'; Gertmonas (yellow card) 8'; Nistor (yellow card) 45+2'; Chipciu (yellow card) 90+1' | Stadium: Oțelul; Attendance: 10,000; Referee: Marian Barbu |

=== Cupa României ===
Oțelul reached the final of the 2023–24 Cupa României, facing Corvinul Hunedoara. The match, played on May 15, 2024, ended in a draw, but Oțelul ultimately fell short in the competition, losing on penalties and failing to secure the trophy.

| 30 August 2023 Play-off | FC Bacău | 1–3 | Oțelul Galați | Ruși-Ciutea |
| 17:30 EEST (UTC+03) | Dudu Drugă 67' (pen.); Ionuț Chirilă (yellow card) 84' | (Report) | Cisotti 57' (pen.); Mihai Adăscăliței 59'; Ariel López 74' (pen.); Zhelev (yellow card) 52'; Răzvan Tănasă (yellow card) 83' | Stadium: Baza Sportivă FC Bacău; Attendance: 500; Referee: Cristian Moldoveanu |

| 26 September 2023 Group-stage 1 | SCM Zalău | 1–4 | Oțelul Galați | Zalău |
| 16:15 EEST (UTC+03) | Alexandru Cherecheș 45+4'; Sergiu Pop (yellow card) 35' (yellow-red card) 47' | (Report) | Cârjan 14', 36'; Cissé 21'; Latouchent 75'; Jardan (yellow card) 58'; Costin Ghiocel (yellow card) 56' | Stadium: Municipal; Attendance: 2,000; Referee: Sorin Vădana |

| 31 October 2023 Group-stage 2 | Oțelul Galați | 1–1 | FCSB | Galați |
| 21:00 EET (UTC+02) | Ariel López 90+1'; Živulić (yellow card) 56' | (Report) | Băluță 76', (yellow card) 87'; Ov. Popescu (yellow card) 56' | Stadium: Oțelul; Attendance: 10,500; Referee: Viorel Flueran |

| 7 December 2023 Group-stage 3 | Dinamo București | 3–3 | Oțelul Galați | București |
| 20:45 EET (UTC+02) | Bena 22'; Amzăr 65'; Gregório 84' | | Teles 25'; Bena 53' (o.g.); Cissé 57', (red card) 90'; Cisotti (yellow card) 55' | Stadium: Arcul de Triumf; Attendance: 450; Referee: George Cătălin Găman |

| 4 April 2024 Quarter-finals | Universitatea Craiova | 0–1 (a.e.t.) | Oțelul Galați | Craiova |
| 19:30 EEST (UTC+03) | Ivan (yellow card) 45+2'; Mitriță (yellow card) 72' | (Report) | Lameira 114'; Mihai Adăscăliței (yellow card) 82'; Miguel Silva (yellow card) 14'; Živulić (yellow card) 72'; Zhelev (yellow card) 90+1' | Stadium: Ion Oblemenco; Attendance: 9,123; Referee: Horațiu Feșnic |

| 18 April 2024 Semi-finals | Oțelul Galați | 2–1 | Universitatea Cluj | Galați |
| 20:30 EEST (UTC+03) | Cissé 12'; Chipciu 90' (o.g.); Mihai Adăscăliței (yellow card) 23'; Cisotti (yellow card) 67' | (Report) | Nistor 45+1' (pen.), (yellow card) 88'; Masoero (yellow card) 11'; Oancea (yellow card) 51'; Popa (yellow card) 64'; Chipciu (yellow card) 75'; Silaghi (yellow card) 90+3' | Stadium: Oțelul; Attendance: 8,733; Referee: Radu Petrescu |

| 15 May 2024 Final | Corvinul Hunedoara | 2–2 (a.e.t.) (3–2 p) | Oțelul Galați | Sibiu |
| 20:30 EEST (UTC+03) | Coman 39'; Antoniu Manolache 74'; Viorel Lică (yellow card) 25'; Neacșa (yellow card) 34'; Ionuț Pop (yellow card) 109' | (Report) | Rušević 27', 58' (pen.); Cisotti (yellow card) 34'; Miguel Silva (yellow card) 72'; Cissé (yellow card) 90+9' | Stadium: Municipal; Attendance: 11,703; Referee: Marcel Bîrsan |
| | Penalties |
| | Coman (penalty missed); Antoniu Manolache (penalty scored); Antonio Bradu (penalty scored); Nicolae Pîrvulescu (penalty missed); Hergheligiu (penalty scored) | | (penalty scored) Cisotti; (penalty missed) Gaitán; (penalty missed) Lameira; (penalty missed) Costin Ghiocel; (penalty scored) Miguel Silva |

=== Friendlies ===
| 27 June 2023 | Kapfenberger SV (Austria) | 1–1 | Oțelul Galați | Mönichkirchen, Austria |
| 18:30 EEST (UTC+03) | | (Report) | Ariel López 64' | Stadium: Sportplatz Mönichkirchen |

| 30 June 2023 | Polissya Zhytomyr (Ukraine) | 2–2 | Oțelul Galați | Mönichkirchen, Austria |
| 18:30 EEST (UTC+03) | Yanakov 70', 87' | (Report) | Jardan 40'; Neagu 65' | Stadium: Sportplatz Mönichkirchen |

| 2 July 2023 | Maribor (El Salvador) | 0–0 | Oțelul Galați | Wildon, Austria |
| 18:30 EEST (UTC+03) | | (Report) | | Stadium: Sportplatz Wildon |

| 5 July 2023 | Vojvodina (Serbia) | 2–2 | Oțelul Galați | Lebring, Austria |
| 18:30 EEST (UTC+03) | | | Bodișteanu 35'; Cârjan 62' | Stadium: Sportplatz Lebring |

| 13 October 2023 | Ceahlăul Piatra Neamț | 3–4 | Oțelul Galați | Piatra Neamț |
| 17:00 EEST (UTC+03) | Cortelezzi 9', 45'; Stejărel Vișinar 60' | | Teles 24'; Neagu 42'; A. Pop 67' (pen.); Cârjan 88' | Stadium: Ceahlăul |

| 10 January 2024 | ACS FC Şoimii Gura Humorului | 0–5 | Oțelul Galați | Gura Humorului |
| 12:00 EET (UTC+02) | | | Fatai; Denis Bordun; Bodișteanu; Jardan; João Pedro Pereira Serrão | Stadium: Tineretului; Attendance: 500 |

| 14 January 2024 | FC Botoșani | 1–1 | Oțelul Galați | Botoșani |
| 14:00 EET (UTC+02) | Iličić 9'; Benzar (red card) 20' | | Maciel 13'; Bodișteanu (red card) 20'; Fatai (red card) 86' | Stadium: Municipal; Attendance: 2,000 |

== See also ==
- ASC Oțelul Galați
- 2023–24 Liga I
- 2023–24 Cupa României
