= 2024 Cupa României final =

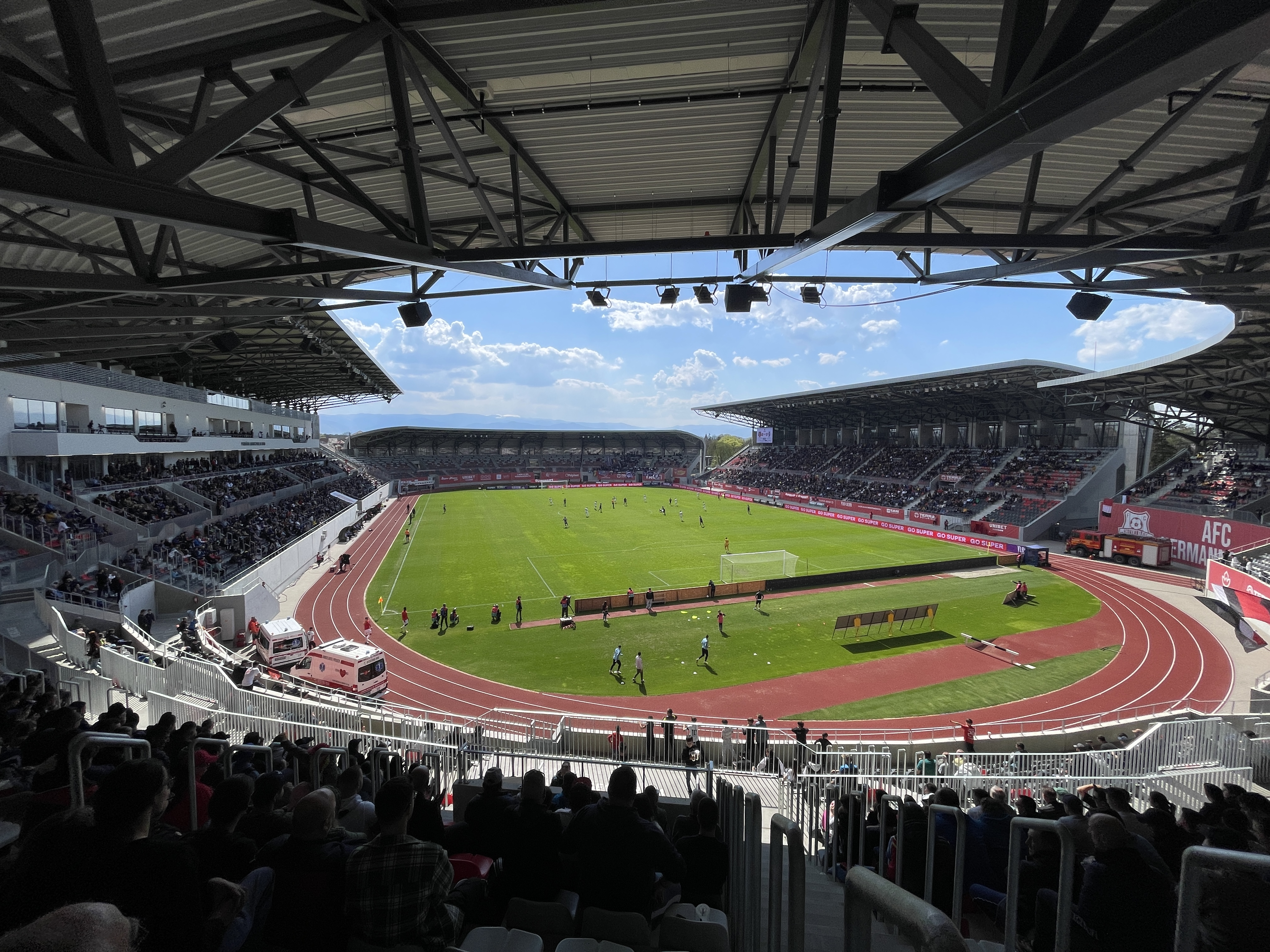
- The match will take place at Municipal, Sibiu
- Event: 2023–24 Cupa României
Corvinul Hunedoara	Oțelul Galați
2	2
- Corvinul Hunedoara won 3–2 after penalties
- Date: 15 May 2024
- Venue: Municipal, Sibiu
- Man of the Match: Ștefan Lefter
- Referee: Marcel Bîrsan
- Attendance: 11,703
- Weather: Clear

The 2024 Cupa României final was the final match of the 2023–24 Cupa României and the 86th final of the Cupa României, Romania's premier football cup competition. It was played on 15 May 2024 between Corvinul Hunedoara and Oțelul Galați, in Sibiu. While for Corvinul this is the first time they reach the final, this will be Oțelul's second chance at the trophy, after the 2004 final that was lost against Dinamo București.

As neither of the teams won the tournament before, the winner became the 24th winner of the Cupa României.

== Route to the final ==
Corvinul Hunedoara		Round	Oțelul Galați
Opponent	Results		Opponent	Results
CSM Jiul Petroșani	4–1 (A)	Third Round	bye	—
FK Csíkszereda	4–2 (H)	Play-off round	FC Bacău	3–1 (A)
Chindia Târgoviște	2–0 (H)	Group stage – Week 1	SCM Zalău	4–1 (A)
Sepsi Sfântu Gheorghe	1–0 (H)	Group stage – Week 2	FCSB	1–1 (H)
Progresul Pecica	6–0 (A)	Group stage – Week 3	Dinamo București	3–3 (A)
CFR Cluj	4–0 (H)	Quarter-finals	Universitatea Craiova	1–0 (A)
FC Voluntari	3–1 (H)	Semi-finals	Universitatea Cluj	2–1 (H)

== Match ==
15 May 2024
20:30 EEST (UTC+03)

Corvinul Hunedoara	2–2 (a.e.t.)	Oțelul Galați
Coman 39'; Manolache 74'		Rušević 27', 58' (pen.)
Penalties
Coman (penalty missed); Manolache (penalty scored); Bradu (penalty scored); Pîrvulescu (penalty missed); Hergheligiu (penalty scored)	3–2	(penalty scored) Cisotti; (penalty missed) Gaitán; (penalty missed) Lameira; (penalty missed) Ghiocel; (penalty scored) Miguel Silva

Municipal, Sibiu
Attendance: 11,703
Referee: Marcel Bîrsan

Corvinul Hunedoara	Oțelul Galați

GK	12	(Romania) Ștefan Lefter
DF	98	(Romania) Mihai Velisar
DF	30	(Romania) Antoniu Manolache
DF	6	(Romania) Viorel Lică	(yellow card) 25'	(substituted off) 90+2'
DF	13	(Romania) Flavius Iacob
MF	97	(Romania) Denis Hrezdac		(substituted off) 119'
MF	8	(Romania) Antonio Bradu
MF	19	(Romania) Nicolae Pîrvulescu
MF	10	(Romania) Alexandru Neacșa (c)	(yellow card) 34'	(substituted off) 88'
MF	7	(Romania) Marius Lupu
FW	9	(Romania) Marius Coman
Substitutes:
GK	1	(Romania) Cristian Blaga
DF	3	(Romania) Ionuț Pop	(yellow card) 108'	(substituted on) 88'
DF	5	(Romania) Adrian Nicolae
FW	11	(Romania) Sebastian Ion
FW	14	(Romania) Andrei Hergheligiu		(substituted on) 119'
MF	15	(Romania) Alexandru Predică
MF	18	(Romania) Timotei Mitran
FW	27	(Romania) Lucas Câmpan
MF	33	(Romania) Marius Chindriș		(substituted on) 90+2'
Manager:
(Romania) Florin Maxim

GK	94	(Romania) Eduard Pap
DF	28	(Portugal) Miguel Silva	(yellow card) 72'
DF	6	(Ivory Coast) Jonathan Cissé	(yellow card) 90+9'
DF	15	(Burkina Faso) François Yabré		(substituted off) 120'
DF	2	(Bulgaria) Milen Zhelev
MF	66	(Portugal) João Lameira
MF	31	(Croatia) Diego Živulić
MF	30	(Italy) Juri Cisotti (c)	(yellow card) 34'
FW	9	(Serbia) Anes Rušević		(substituted off) 75'
FW	20	(Romania) Ștefan Bodișteanu		(substituted off) 66'
FW	67	(Portugal) Frédéric Maciel		(substituted off) 75'
Substitutes:
GK	12	(Romania) Relu Stoian
MF	8	(Romania) Ionuț Neagu
DF	14	(Romania) Andrei Rus
DF	16	(Romania) Costin Ghiocel		(substituted on) 120'
MF	17	(Romania) Răzvan Tănasă		(substituted on) 66'
MF	19	(Mali) Aly Mallé		(substituted on) 75'
DF	22	(Romania) Dan Panait
MF	23	(Moldova) Vasile Jardan
FW	27	(Argentina) Pablo Gaitán		(substituted on) 75'
Manager:
(Romania) Dorinel Munteanu

MAN OF THE MATCH

- (Romania) Ștefan Lefter

MATCH OFFICIALS

- Assistant referees:
  - Vladimir Urzică (Piatra Neamț)
  - Imre Laszlo Bucși (Sfântu Gheorghe)
- Fourth official:
  - Florin Andrei (Târgu Mureș)
- Video assistant referee:
  - Rareș George Vidican (Satu Mare)
- Assistant video assistant referee:
  - Szabolcs Kovacs (Carei)
