= 2024–25 FC Botoșani season =

FC Botoșani
2024–25 season
- Manager: Bogdan Andone (until 25 July); Liviu Ciobotariu (from 25 July - 6 January) Leontin Grozavu (from 7 January)
- Stadium: Botoșani Municipal Stadium
- Liga I: 12th
- Cupa României: Pre-season
- Average home league attendance: 3,308
- Biggest win: Botoșani 2–0 FC Rapid București
Home colours	Away colours	Third colours

The 2024–25 season is the 24th season in the history of FC Botoșani, and the club's 12th consecutive season in Liga I. In addition to the domestic league, the team is scheduled to participate in the Cupa României.

== Summary ==
During the team's inaugural competitive match of the season against Oțelul Galați, coach Bogdan Andone was issued a red card following his vigorous objection to the assistant referee and verbal altercation with the main referee due to their "refusal" to award his players a free kick on the fringe of the opposing team's penalty area. As a form of discipline, he received a fine and was suspended for four matches. Subsequently, the coach expressed remorse for his actions. Ten days later, his contract was terminated. He was replaced by Liviu Ciobotariu, who coached Botoșani in 2018–19.

== Squad ==
Position	Number	Player	Date joined	Further data
GK		(Romania) Alin Ciobanu		
GK		(Bosnia and Herzegovina) Luka Kukić		
GK		(Romania) Eduard Pap		
DF		(Romania) Romario Benzar		
DF		(Romania) Daniel Celea		
DF		(Romania) Răzvan Creț		
DF		(Romania) Andrei Miron		
DF		(Slovenia) Michael Pavlovic		
DF		(Malawi) Charles Petro		
DF		(Bosnia and Herzegovina) Rijad Sadiku		
DF		(Romania) Alin Șeroni		
DF		(Romania) Alexandru Țigănusu		
MF		(Nigeria) Adams Friday		
MF		(Romania) Gabriel David		
MF		(Romania) Victor Dican		
MF		(Angola) Aldair Ferreira		
MF		(Romania) Eduard Florescu		
MF		(Romania) Lóránd Fülöp		
MF		(Romania) George Gligor		
MF		(Romania) Zoran Mitrov		
MF		(France) Jaly Mouaddib		
FW		(Romania) Codrin Carăușu		
FW		(Romania) Adrian Chică-Roșă		
FW		(Argentina) Juan Kaprof		
FW		(Argentina) Enzo Lopez		

== Transfers ==
=== In ===
Pos.	Player	Transferred from	Fee	Date	Source
FW	(Romania) Ștefan Bodișteanu	(Romania) Farul Constanța	Undisclosed	10 July 2024	

=== Out ===
Pos.	Player	Transferred to	Fee	Date	Source
FW	(Guinea) Sekou Camara	(Romania) Unirea Slobozia	End of contract	1 July 2024	
MF	(Romania) Victor Dican	(Romania) Farul Constanța		11 July 2024	
MF	(Romania) Sebastian Mailat	(South Korea) Suwon Samsung Bluewings	€300,000	28 July 2024	

== Friendlies ==
=== Pre-season ===
The squad held a camp in Austria until 3 July, during which three friendly matches were played.

24 June 2024 Friendly	Botoșani (Romania)	5–0	(Germany) SB Chiemgau Traunstein
18:00

27 June 2024 Friendly	Legia Warsaw (Poland)	6–0	(Romania) Botoșani	Kössen, Austria
17:30	Gual 56'; Urbanski 65'; Pekhart 85'; Rosołek 101'; Majchrzak 115', 118'
Note: 2 x 60 minutes

30 June 2024 Friendly	Botoșani (Romania)	3–2	(Czech Republic) FK Jablonec	Fulpmes, Austria
17:00	Țigănusu 21'; Mailat 30'; Friday 75'		Puškáč 14', 42'	Stadium: Sportplatz Fulpmes

2 July 2024 Friendly	SVG Reichenau (Austria)	1–3	(Romania) Botoșani
18:30	(penalty missed) 39'; 72'		Fülöp 26'; Mouaddib 51'; 61'
Note: 2 x 35 minutes

== Competitions ==
=== Overall record ===
Competition	First match	Last match	Starting round	Record							
Competition	First match	Last match	Starting round	Pld	W	D	L	GF	GA	GD	Win %
Liga I	15 July 2024		Matchday 1	3	1	0	2	3	4	−1	33.33
Cupa României				0	0	0	0	0	0	+0	—
Total				3	1	0	2	3	4	−1	33.33

Last updated: 28 July 2024
Source: Soccerway

=== Liga I ===
==== League table ====
Pos	Team	Pld	W	D	L	GF	GA	GD	Pts	Advances
12	Oțelul Galați	30	7	11	12	24	32	−8	32	Qualification for play-out round
13	Politehnica Iași	30	8	7	15	29	46	−17	31 (Note: Ranked on head-to-head points: Politehnica Iași (4); Botoșani (1).)	Qualification for play-out round
14	Botoșani	30	7	10	13	26	37	−11	31	Qualification for play-out round
15	Unirea Slobozia	30	7	5	18	28	47	−19	26	Qualification for play-out round
16	Gloria Buzău	30	5	5	20	25	51	−26	20	Qualification for play-out round

Source: LPF (in Romanian)
Rules for classification: 1) Points; 2) Head-to-head points; 3) Head-to-head goal difference; 4) Head-to-head goals scored; 5) Goal difference; 6) Goals scored; 7) Play-off.

==== Results summary ====
Overall								Home						Away					
Pld	W	D	L	GF	GA	GD	Pts	W	D	L	GF	GA	GD	W	D	L	GF	GA	GD
3	1	0	2	3	4	−1	3	0	0	1	2	3	−1	1	0	1	1	1	0

Last updated: 28 July 2024.

==== Results by round ====
Round	1	2	3	4
Ground	H	A	A	H
Result	L	L	W	P
Position	13	16		

Updated to match(es) played on 28 July 2024. Source:
A = Away; H = Home; W = Win; D = Draw; L = Loss

==== Matches ====
The match schedule was released on 1 July 2024.

15 July 2024 1	Botoșani	2–3	Oțelul Galați	Botoșani
18:30 UTC+3	Chică Roșă (yellow card) 20'; Friday 33'; Ferreira (yellow card) 41'; Celea (yellow card) 45+2'; Mailat 56'		Pop 6'; Živulić (yellow card) 29', (goal) 65', 67'; Stevanović (yellow card) 90+9'	Stadium: Botoșani Municipal Stadium; Referee: Cristian Moldoveanu

19 July 2024 2	Politehnica Iași	1–0	Botoșani	Iași
19:00 UTC+3	Bordeianu 7'; Harrison (yellow card) 90+2'		Mailat (yellow card) 69'; Ferreira (yellow card) 81'; Țigănașu (yellow card) 87'	Stadium: Emil Alexandrescu Stadium; Referee: Florin Andrei

28 July 2024 3	Farul Constanța	0–1	Botoșani	Constanța
19:00 UTC+3	Popescu (yellow card) 41'		Bodișteanu (yellow card) 8', (goal) 47'; Friday (red card) 56'; Șeroni (yellow card) 61'; Pavlovič (yellow card) 82'; Pap (yellow card) 90+8'	Stadium: Central Stadium; Referee: Flueran Viorel Nicusor

3 August 2024 4	Botoșani	v	FCSB	Botoșani
22:00 UTC+3				Stadium: Botoșani Municipal Stadium
