= Valeriu Iftime =

Romanian politician

Owner of FC Botoșani
- Incumbent
- Assumed office 1 July 2005

President of the Botoșani County Council
- Incumbent
- Assumed office 28 October 2024
- Preceded by: Doina Federovici

Personal details
- Born: 31 May 1960 (age 66) Zlătunoaia, Botoșani County, Romania
- Citizenship: Romania
- Party: PNL (since 2024)
- Children: 2
- Education: Gheorghe Asachi Technical University of Iași
- Occupation: Businessman, politician
- Net Worth: US$115 Million (2025)

Valeriu Iftime (born 31 May 1960) is a Romanian businessman, sports director and politician affiliated with the National Liberal Party (PNL). He is best known for founding the Elsaco Group, owning FC Botoșani, and serving as President of the Botoșani County Council since 2024.

== Entrepreneurship ==
Iftime is the founder and president of the Elsaco Group, a Romanian company specializing in energy efficiency, automation, and IT&C services. Under his leadership, Elsaco has played a significant role in modernizing Romania's infrastructure, including major projects like the rehabilitation of Bucharest’s heating network.

== Football involvement ==
Since 2005, Iftime has been the owner of FC Botoșani, a football club competing in Romania's top division, Liga I. He is credited with transforming the club into a stable and competitive team by investing in youth development and securing sponsorships through his business network.

== Political career ==
In 2024, Iftime transitioned into politics and was elected President of the Botoșani County Council, officially taking office on October 28, 2024. His political platform emphasizes regional development, education, and infrastructure, aligning with the pro-European stance of the PNL.

== Personal life ==
Valeriu Iftime has two sons, Vlad and Șerban, who are actively involved in managing companies within the Elsaco portfolio. Despite his estimated net worth exceeding $115 million, Iftime is known for his modest lifestyle—famously opting to ride the metro in Bucharest to avoid traffic.
