= Jonathan Cissé =

Ivorian footballer

Personal information
- Date of birth: 18 May 1997 (age 29)
- Place of birth: Divo, Ivory Coast
- Height: 1.95 m (6 ft 5 in)
- Position: Defender

Team information
- Current team: Universitatea Cluj
- Number: 26

Senior career*
Years	Team	Apps	(Gls)
2016–2019	Monaco B	45	(2)
2019–2023	Hapoel Hadera	106	(6)
2023–2025	Oțelul Galați	54	(3)
2025–	Universitatea Cluj	19	(0)
Medal record
Men's football
Representing Ivory Coast
U-23 Africa Cup of Nations
Silver medal – second place	2019 Egypt	U-23 Team
- * Club domestic league appearances and goals as of 7 March 2026

Jonathan Cissé (born 18 May 1997) is an Ivorian professional footballer who plays as a defender for Liga I club Universitatea Cluj.

== Career ==
Cissé started his career with the reserves of Monaco, one of France's most successful clubs but left due to injury.

In 2019, he signed for Hapoel Hadera in Israel after almost joining French Ligue 1 side Lens.

On 17 August 2023 signed for Oțelul Galați.

== Career statistics ==
As of match played 7 March 2026

Appearances and goals by club, season and competition
Club	Season	League			National cup (Note: Includes Israel State Cup, Cupa României)		League cup (Note: Includes Toto Cup)		Europe		Other		Total	
Club	Season	Division	Apps	Goals	Apps	Goals	Apps	Goals	Apps	Goals	Apps	Goals	Apps	Goals
Monaco B	2016–17	CFA	15	2	—		—		—		—		15	2
Monaco B	2017–18	Championnat National 2	13	0	—		—		—		—		13	0
Monaco B	2018–19	Championnat National 2	17	0	—		—		—		—		17	0
Monaco B	Total		45	2	—		—		—		—		45	2
Hapoel Hadera	2019–20	Israeli Premier League	12	0	0	0	4	0	—		—		16	0
Hapoel Hadera	2020–21	Israeli Premier League	31	2	0	0	2	0	—		—		33	2
Hapoel Hadera	2021–22	Israeli Premier League	33	1	3	0	5	0	—		—		41	1
Hapoel Hadera	2022–23	Israeli Premier League	30	3	0	0	5	1	—		—		35	4
Hapoel Hadera	Total		106	6	3	0	16	1	—		—		125	7
Oțelul Galați	2023–24	Liga I	26	2	5	3	—		—		1 (Note: Appearance in Liga I European play-offs)	0	32	5
Oțelul Galați	2024–25	Liga I	28	1	1	0	—		—		—		29	1
Oțelul Galați	Total		54	3	6	3	—		—		1	0	61	6
Universitatea Cluj	2025–26	Liga I	19	0	2	0	—		0	0	—		21	0
Universitatea Cluj	2026–27	Liga I	0	0	0	0	—		0	0	0	0	0	0
Universitatea Cluj	Total		19	0	2	0	—		0	0	0	0	21	0
Career total			224	11	11	3	16	1	0	0	1	0	252	15

== Honours ==
Oțelul Galați

- Cupa României runner-up: 2023–24

Universitatea Cluj

- Cupa României runner-up: 2025–26
- Supercupa României runner-up: 2026

Ivory Coast U23

- Africa U-23 Cup of Nations runner-up: 2019
