= Nicolae Pîrvulescu =

Romanian footballer

Personal information
- Full name: Nicolae Daniel Pîrvulescu
- Date of birth: 28 November 1996 (age 29)
- Place of birth: Craiova, Romania
- Height: 1.80 m (5 ft 11 in)
- Position: Winger

Team information
- Current team: Corvinul Hunedoara
- Number: 19

Youth career
- –2016: Pandurii Târgu Jiu

Senior career*
Years	Team	Apps	(Gls)
2016–2017	Pandurii II Târgu Jiu		
2017–2019	Pandurii Târgu Jiu	48	(13)
2019–2022	Universitatea Cluj	64	(9)
2022	Concordia Chiajna	10	(0)
2022–	Corvinul Hunedoara	93	(13)
- * Club domestic league appearances and goals as of 7 November 2026

Nicolae Daniel Pîrvulescu (born 28 November 1996) is a Romanian professional footballer who plays as a winger for Liga I club Corvinul Hunedoara.

== Honours ==
Corvinul Hunedoara

- Liga II: 2025–26
- Liga III: 2022–23
- Cupa României: 2023–24
- Supercupa României runner-up: 2024
