= Bogdan Oteliță =

Romanian footballer

Personal information
- Full name: Bogdan Florin Oteliță
- Date of birth: 12 August 2002 (age 24)
- Place of birth: Bacău, Romania
- Height: 1.80 m (5 ft 11 in)
- Position: Right-back

Team information
- Current team: Sepsi OSK
- Number: 25

Youth career
- –2017: FCM Bacău
- 2017–2018: Ceahlăul Piatra Neamț

Senior career*
| Years | Team | Apps | (Gls) |
| 2018–2020 | Ceahlăul Piatra Neamț | | |
| 2020–2021 | Aerostar Bacău | 20 | (0) |
| 2021–2023 | Gloria Buzău | 32 | (0) |
| 2023– | Sepsi OSK | 81 | (1) |

International career^{‡}
| 2023 | Romania U20 | 2 | (0) |
| 2024 | Romania U21 | 2 | (0) |
- * Club domestic league appearances and goals as of 8 November 2026 ‡ National team caps and goals as of 10 September 2024

Bogdan Florin Oteliță (born 12 August 2002) is a Romanian professional footballer who plays as a right-back for Liga I club Sepsi OSK.

== Club career ==
At the age of 16 he played in the Liga III for Ceahlăul Piatra Neamț. After spending 3 seasons in the Liga II, he joined Liga I side Sepsi OSK, where he made his official debut in the 2023 Supercupa României final win against Farul Constanța on 8 July 2023.

== Career statistics ==
=== Club ===
As of match played 8 November 2026

Appearances and goals by club, season and competition
| Club | Season | League | | | Cupa României | | Continental | | Other | | Total | |
| Club | Season | Division | Apps | Goals | Apps | Goals | Apps | Goals | Apps | Goals | Apps | Goals |
|---|---|---|---|---|---|---|---|---|---|---|---|---|
| Ceahlăul Piatra Neamț | 2018–19 | Liga III | ? | ? | ? | ? | — | | — | | ? | ? |
| Ceahlăul Piatra Neamț | 2019–20 | Liga III | ? | ? | ? | ? | — | | — | | ? | ? |
| Ceahlăul Piatra Neamț | Total | | ? | ? | ? | ? | — | | — | | ? | ? |
| Aerostar Bacău | 2020–21 | Liga II | 20 | 0 | 0 | 0 | — | | — | | 20 | 0 |
| Gloria Buzău | 2021–22 | Liga II | 12 | 0 | 3 | 0 | — | | — | | 15 | 0 |
| Gloria Buzău | 2022–23 | Liga II | 20 | 0 | 4 | 0 | — | | 2 (Note: Appearances in Liga I promotion/relegation play-offs) | 0 | 26 | 0 |
| Gloria Buzău | Total | | 32 | 0 | 7 | 0 | — | | 2 | 0 | 41 | 0 |
| Sepsi OSK | 2023–24 | Liga I | 22 | 0 | 0 | 0 | 0 | 0 | 1 (Note: Appearance in Supercupa României) | 0 | 23 | 0 |
| Sepsi OSK | 2024–25 | Liga I | 25 | 0 | 1 | 0 | — | | — | | 26 | 0 |
| Sepsi OSK | 2025–26 | Liga II | 22 | 0 | 3 | 0 | — | | — | | 25 | 0 |
| Sepsi OSK | 2026–27 | Liga I | 12 | 1 | 3 | 0 | — | | — | | 15 | 1 |
| Sepsi OSK | Total | | 81 | 1 | 7 | 0 | 0 | 0 | 1 | 0 | 89 | 1 |
| Career total | | | 132 | 1 | 14 | 0 | 0 | 0 | 3 | 0 | 149 | 1 |

== Honours ==
Sepsi OSK

- Supercupa României: 2023
