= Aurelian Păun =

Romanian footballer

Personal information
- Full name: Aurelian Eusebio Păun
- Date of birth: 5 May 2001 (age 25)
- Place of birth: Pitești, Romania
- Height: 1.87 m (6 ft 2 in)
- Position: Goalkeeper

Youth career
- 2011–2018: FC Star Sport Argeș
- 2018–2019: CFR Cluj

Senior career*
| Years | Team | Apps | (Gls) |
| 2019–2020 | Turris Turnu Măgurele | 9 | (0) |
| 2021–2022 | Academica Clinceni | 9 | (0) |
| 2022–2023 | Universitatea Cluj | 2 | (0) |
| 2023 | Oțelul Galați | 0 | (0) |
| 2023–2024 | Progresul Spartac | 11 | (0) |
| 2024 | Unirea Bascov | 12 | (0) |
| 2024 | Viitorul Târgu Jiu | 2 | (0) |
- * Club domestic league appearances and goals as of 14 September 2024

Aurelian Eusebio Păun (born 5 May 2001) is a Romanian professional footballer who plays as a goalkeeper.

== Honours ==
Universitatea Cluj

- Cupa României runner-up: 2022–23
