= Alexandru Pop (footballer, born 2000) =

Romanian footballer (born 2000)

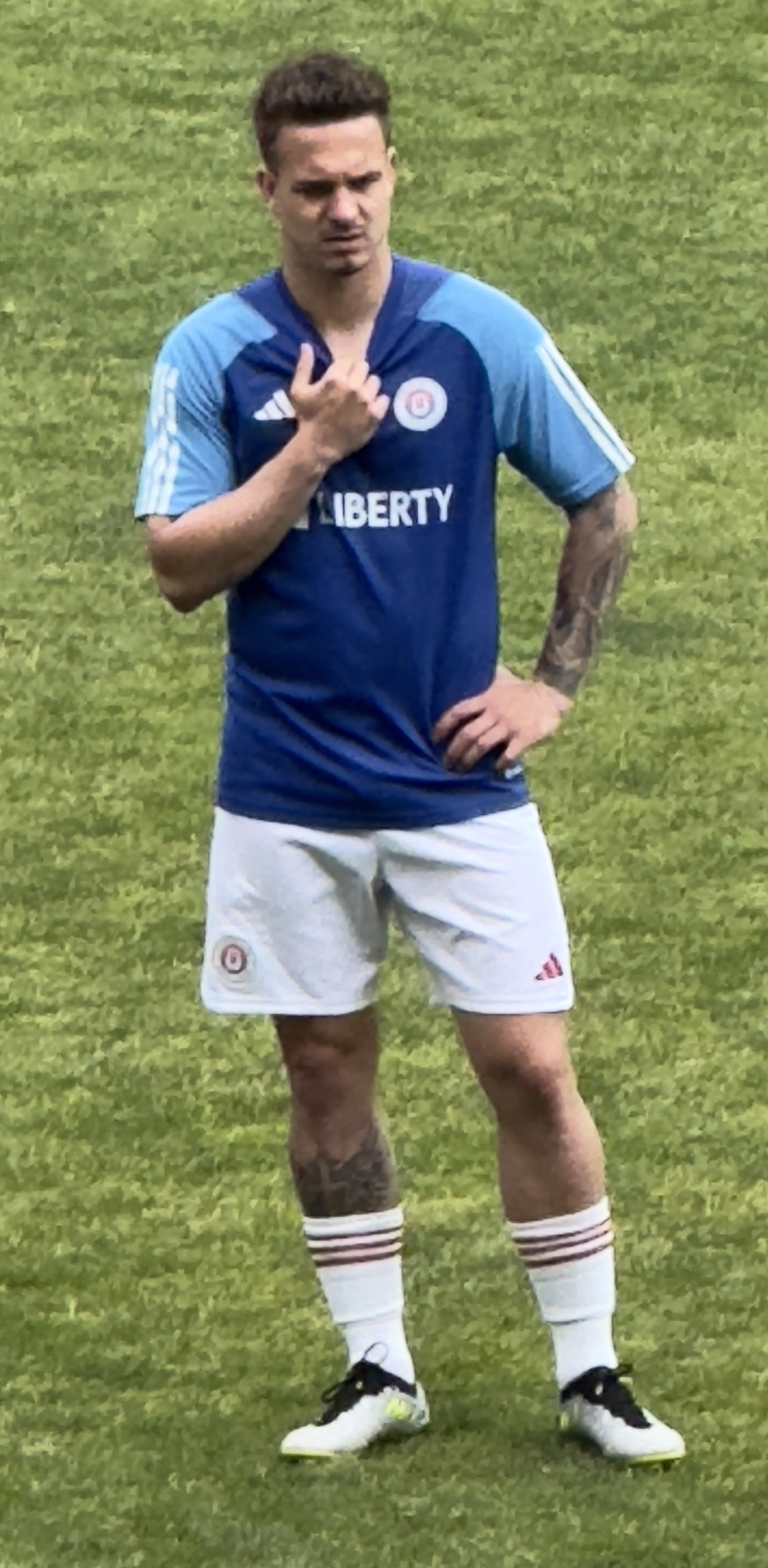
- Pop with Oțelul Galați in 2024

Personal information
- Full name: Alexandru Mihai Constantin Pop
- Date of birth: 1 February 2000 (age 26)
- Place of birth: San Antonio de Areco, Argentina
- Height: 1.73 m (5 ft 8 in)
- Position: Forward

Team information
- Current team: Ironi Kiryat Shmona
- Number: 9

Youth career
- 2007–2012: CFR Cluj
- 2012–2016: Universitatea Cluj
- 2016–2019: Gheorghe Hagi Academy

Senior career*
| Years | Team | Apps | (Gls) |
| 2015–2016 | Universitatea Cluj | 3 | (0) |
| 2019–2021 | Viitorul Constanța | 0 | (0) |
| 2019–2021 | → Universitatea Cluj (loan) | 37 | (8) |
| 2021–2022 | Farul Constanța | 0 | (0) |
| 2021–2022 | → Unirea Dej (loan) | 40 | (11) |
| 2023 | Unirea Dej | 13 | (4) |
| 2023–2024 | Oțelul Galați | 57 | (16) |
| 2025–2026 | Dinamo București | 61 | (5) |
| 2026– | Ironi Kiryat Shmona | 6 | (0) |

International career
| 2017 | Romania U17 | 1 | (0) |
| 2017–2018 | Romania U18 | 5 | (0) |
| 2018 | Romania U19 | 2 | (0) |
- * Club domestic league appearances and goals as of 7 November 2026

Alexandru Mihai Constantin Pop (born 1 February 2000) is a Romanian professional footballer who plays as a forward for Israeli Premier League club Ironi Kiryat Shmona.

Pop started out as a senior at Universitatea Cluj, making his debut in 2016, aged 16. He moved to Viitorul Constanța during the summer of that year, but never made an official appearance and was loaned back to Universitatea Cluj and Unirea Dej, respectively. In 2023, Pop signed for Oțelul Galați in the top flight. One and half years later, his performances earned him a transfer to Dinamo București.

Internationally, Pop represented Romania from under-17 up to under-19 level.

== Club career ==
=== Early career ===
Before starting his junior career with CFR Cluj at age seven, Pop practiced swimming, karate, and dancesport, respectively. He then moved to city rivals Universitatea Cluj, for which he made his senior debut at the age of 16 years and 2 months.

Pop registered his first appearance on 20 April 2016, coming on as a 78th-minute substitute for Jakub Vojtuš in a 2–0 Liga II win over Sportul Snagov.

=== Viitorul Constanța and loans ===
Pop had a one-week tryout at Italian club Roma in the summer of 2016, but nothing came of it and instead joined Viitorul Constanța's academy. He returned to Universitatea Cluj on loan in the summer of 2019, playing 39 games and scoring four goals in all competitions during his two-year stint back in the Liga II.

Between 2021 and 2023, Pop represented Unirea Dej, also in the second division. In the 2022–23 season, he totalled nine goals from 29 league appearances, as his side finished fourth in the promotion play-offs.

=== Oțelul Galați ===
On 5 June 2023, Pop agreed to a one-year contract with Oțelul Galați, newly promoted to the Liga I. Unirea Dej retained 50% participation rights in a co-ownership deal. Pop made his competitive debut on 14 July, equalising in a 1–1 home league draw to UTA Arad. On 12 August, he scored in a 1–1 home draw against his former club Universitatea Cluj.

Pop scored once more against Universitatea Cluj on 17 December 2023, representing the only goal of the away match. By the turn of the year, he became the second-best goal scorer of the Liga I with nine goals, sharing the position with several other players. On 4 January 2024, he signed a contract extension lasting until 30 June 2025.

On 27 February 2024, Pop converted a free kick in a 2–2 home draw against his former youth side CFR Cluj. On 2 December that year, he scored Oțelul's only goal in a 1–4 home loss to defending champions FCSB.

=== Dinamo București ===
On 31 December 2024, fellow Liga I club Dinamo București announced the signing of Pop on a two-and-a-half-year contract with the option of another year. The transfer fee was reported as being worth €125,000, and Oțelul Galați also stated that it would retain interest on a possible future move.

== Personal life ==
Pop was born in Buenos Aires, Argentina, to Romanian parents from Huedin, Cluj County. They moved back to Romania when he was around two or three years old.

Pop has a bachelor's degree in public relations from the Babeș-Bolyai University.

== Career statistics ==
As of match played on 7 November 2026

Appearances and goals by club, season and competition
| Club | Season | League | | | Cupa României | | Europe | | Other | | Total | |
| Club | Season | Division | Apps | Goals | Apps | Goals | Apps | Goals | Apps | Goals | Apps | Goals |
|---|---|---|---|---|---|---|---|---|---|---|---|---|
| Universitatea Cluj | 2015–16 | Liga II | 3 | 0 | 0 | 0 | — | | — | | 3 | 0 |
| Universitatea Cluj (loan) | 2019–20 | Liga II | 21 | 4 | 2 | 0 | — | | — | | 23 | 4 |
| Universitatea Cluj (loan) | 2020–21 | Liga II | 16 | 4 | 1 | 1 | — | | — | | 17 | 5 |
| Universitatea Cluj (loan) | Total | | 37 | 8 | 3 | 1 | — | | — | | 40 | 9 |
| Unirea Dej (loan) | 2021–22 | Liga II | 24 | 6 | 1 | 0 | — | | — | | 25 | 6 |
| Unirea Dej (loan) | 2022–23 | Liga II | 29 | 9 | 0 | 0 | — | | — | | 29 | 9 |
| Unirea Dej (loan) | Total | | 53 | 15 | 1 | 0 | — | | — | | 54 | 15 |
| Oțelul Galați | 2023–24 | Liga I | 36 | 11 | 5 | 0 | — | | 0 | 0 | 41 | 11 |
| Oțelul Galați | 2024–25 | Liga I | 21 | 5 | 3 | 0 | — | | — | | 24 | 5 |
| Oțelul Galați | Total | | 57 | 16 | 8 | 0 | — | | 0 | 0 | 65 | 16 |
| Dinamo București | 2024–25 | Liga I | 17 | 0 | — | | — | | — | | 17 | 0 |
| Dinamo București | 2025–26 | Liga I | 36 | 4 | 5 | 1 | — | | 0 | 0 | 41 | 5 |
| Dinamo București | 2026–27 | Liga I | 8 | 1 | 1 | 0 | — | | — | | 9 | 1 |
| Dinamo București | Total | | 61 | 5 | 6 | 1 | — | | 0 | 0 | 67 | 6 |
| Ironi Kiryat Shmona | 2026–27 | Israeli Premier League | 6 | 0 | 0 | 0 | — | | — | | 6 | 0 |
| Career total | | | 217 | 44 | 18 | 2 | — | | 0 | 0 | 235 | 46 |

== Honours ==
Oțelul Galați

- Cupa României runner-up: 2023–24
