= Juri Cisotti =

Italian professional footballer

Personal information
- Date of birth: 5 May 1993 (age 33)
- Place of birth: Tolmezzo, Italy
- Height: 1.74 m (5 ft 9 in)
- Position: Midfielder

Team information
- Current team: FCSB
- Number: 31

Youth career
- 2003–2010: Donatello Calcio Udine
- 2010–2011: Triestina
- 2011–2013: Chievo

Senior career*
Years	Team	Apps	(Gls)
2011	Triestina	1	(0)
2013–2015	Chievo	0	(0)
2013–2014	→ Latina (loan)	18	(1)
2014–2015	→ Spezia (loan)	22	(1)
2015–2018	Spezia	4	(0)
2015	→ Rijeka II (loan)	13	(6)
2016	→ Vicenza (loan)	0	(0)
2017	→ Casertana (loan)	9	(0)
2018–2019	Mosta	18	(1)
2019–2021	Sliema Wanderers	43	(10)
2021–2025	Oțelul Galați	109	(35)
2025–	FCSB	66	(9)
- * Club domestic league appearances and goals as of 2 November 2026

Juri Cisotti (born 5 May 1993) is an Italian professional footballer who plays as a midfielder for Liga I club FCSB.

== Career statistics ==
As of match played 2 November 2026

Appearances and goals by club, season and competition
Club	Season	League			National cup (Note: Includes Coppa Italia, Maltese FA Trophy, Cupa României)		Europe		Other		Total	
Club	Season	Division	Apps	Goals	Apps	Goals	Apps	Goals	Apps	Goals	Apps	Goals
Triestina	2010–11	Serie B	1	0	—		—		—		1	0
Triestina	2011–12	Serie B	0	0	3	0	—		—		3	0
Triestina	Total		1	0	3	0	—		—		4	0
Latina (loan)	2013–14	Serie B	18	1	1	0	—		4 (Note: Appearances in Serie B promotion play-offs)	1	23	2
Spezia (loan)	2014–15	Serie B	22	1	0	0	—		—		22	1
Spezia	2016–17	Serie B	4	0	1	0	—		—		5	0
Spezia	Total		26	1	1	0	—		—		27	1
Rijeka II (loan)	2015–16	3. HNL West	13	6	—		—		—		13	6
Vicenza (loan)	2015–16	Serie B	0	0	—		—		—		0	0
Casertana (loan)	2016–17	Lega Pro	9	0	—		—		0	0	9	0
Mosta	2018–19	Maltese Premier League	18	1	2	1	—		—		20	2
Sliema Wanderers	2019–20	Maltese Premier League	20	5	1	0	—		—		35	5
Sliema Wanderers	2020–21	Maltese Premier League	23	5	1	0	—		—		29	5
Sliema Wanderers	Total		43	10	2	0	—		—		45	10
Oțelul Galați	2021–22	Liga III	30	18	1	0	—		4 (Note: Appearances in Liga III promotion play-offs)	1	35	19
Oțelul Galați	2022–23	Liga II	26	5	3	0	—		—		29	5
Oțelul Galați	2023–24	Liga I	36	9	7	1	—		1 (Note: Appearance in Liga I European play-offs)	0	44	10
Oțelul Galați	2024–25	Liga I	17	3	3	0	—		—		20	3
Oțelul Galați	Total		109	35	14	1	—		5	1	128	37
FCSB	2024–25	Liga I	16	4	—		4 (Note: Appearances in UEFA Europa League)	1	—		20	5
FCSB	2025–26	Liga I	36	5	0	0	15 (Note: Four appearances in UEFA Champions League and one goal, eleven appearances and two goals in UEFA Europa League)	3	3 (Note: One appearance in Supercupa României, two appearances in Liga I European play-offs)	0	54	8
FCSB	2026–27	Liga I	14	0	2	0	2 (Note: Appearances in UEFA Conference League)	0	—		18	0
FCSB	Total		66	9	2	0	21	4	3	0	92	13
Career Total			303	63	25	2	21	4	12	2	361	71

== Honours ==
Oțelul Galați

- Cupa României runner-up: 2023–24
- Liga III: 2021–22

FCSB

- Liga I: 2024–25
- Supercupa României: 2025

Individual

- Gazeta Sporturilor Foreign Player of the Year in Romania: 2025
