= Ștefan Bodișteanu =

Moldovan footballer (born 2003)

Personal information
- Date of birth: 1 February 2003 (age 23)
- Place of birth: Chișinău, Moldova
- Height: 1.80 m (5 ft 11 in)
- Position: Attacking midfielder

Team information
- Current team: Botoșani
- Number: 10

Youth career
- 2010–2015: Zimbru Chișinău
- 2015–2020: Gheorghe Hagi Academy

Senior career*
| Years | Team | Apps | (Gls) |
| 2020–2021 | Viitorul Constanța | 7 | (0) |
| 2021–2024 | Farul Constanța | 2 | (0) |
| 2022–2023 | → CSA Steaua București (loan) | 23 | (5) |
| 2023–2024 | → Oțelul Galați (loan) | 34 | (2) |
| 2024– | Botoșani | 83 | (5) |

International career^{‡}
| 2018 | Romania U15 | 5 | (0) |
| 2018–2019 | Romania U16 | 6 | (0) |
| 2019–2020 | Romania U17 | 7 | (2) |
| 2021 | Romania U18 | 2 | (0) |
| 2021–2022 | Romania U19 | 16 | (4) |
| 2023–2024 | Romania U20 | 9 | (1) |
| 2025– | Moldova | 15 | (1) |
- * Club domestic league appearances and goals as of 1 November 2026 ‡ National team caps and goals as of 29 September 2026

Ștefan Bodișteanu (born 1 February 2003) is a professional footballer who plays as an attacking midfielder for Liga I club Botoșani. A former youth international for Romania, he plays for the Moldova national team.

== International career ==
Bodișteanu was born in Moldova, and emigrated to Romania. He was a youth international for Romania.

On 26 February 2025, Bodișteanu's request to switch his international allegiance from Romania to Moldova was approved by FIFA. He made his debut on 22 March 2025 against Norway as a substitute.

== Career statistics ==
=== Club ===
As of match played 1 November 2026

Appearances and goals by club, season and competition
| Club | Season | League | | | Cupa României | | Europe | | Other | | Total | |
| Club | Season | Division | Apps | Goals | Apps | Goals | Apps | Goals | Apps | Goals | Apps | Goals |
|---|---|---|---|---|---|---|---|---|---|---|---|---|
| Viitorul Constanța | 2019–20 | Liga I | 4 | 0 | 0 | 0 | 0 | 0 | 0 | 0 | 4 | 0 |
| Viitorul Constanța | 2020–21 | Liga I | 3 | 0 | 0 | 0 | — | | — | | 3 | 0 |
| Viitorul Constanța | Total | | 7 | 0 | 0 | 0 | 0 | 0 | 0 | 0 | 7 | 0 |
| Farul Constanța | 2021–22 | Liga I | 2 | 0 | 1 | 0 | — | | — | | 3 | 0 |
| CSA Steaua București (loan) | 2022–23 | Liga II | 23 | 5 | 0 | 0 | — | | — | | 23 | 5 |
| Oțelul Galați (loan) | 2023–24 | Liga I | 34 | 2 | 5 | 0 | — | | 1 (Note: Appearances in Liga I European play-offs) | 0 | 40 | 2 |
| Botoșani | 2024–25 | Liga I | 34 | 2 | 2 | 0 | — | | — | | 36 | 2 |
| Botoșani | 2025–26 | Liga I | 35 | 2 | 4 | 2 | — | | 1 | 0 | 40 | 4 |
| Botoșani | 2026–27 | Liga I | 14 | 1 | 2 | 0 | — | | — | | 16 | 1 |
| Botoșani | Total | | 83 | 5 | 8 | 2 | — | | 1 | 0 | 92 | 7 |
| Career total | | | 149 | 12 | 14 | 2 | 0 | 0 | 2 | 0 | 165 | 14 |

=== International ===
As of match played 29 September 2026

Appearances and goals by national team and year
| National team | Year | Apps | Goals |
|---|---|---|---|
Moldova
| Moldova | 2025 | 10 | 1 |
| Moldova | 2026 | 5 | 0 |
| Total | | 15 | 1 |

Scores and results list Moldova's goal tally first, score column indicates score after each Bodișteanu goal.

List of international goals scored by Ștefan Bodișteanu
| No. | Date | Venue | Cap | Opponent | Score | Result | Competition |
|---|---|---|---|---|---|---|---|
| 1 | 14 October 2025 | Lilleküla Stadium, Tallinn, Estonia | 8 | Estonia | 1–1 | 1–1 | 2026 FIFA World Cup qualification |

== Honours ==
Oțelul Galați

- Cupa României runner-up: 2023–24
