= Rosario Latouchent =

French footballer (born 1996)

Personal information
- Date of birth: 21 March 1996 (age 30)
- Place of birth: Paris, France
- Height: 1.80 m (5 ft 11 in)
- Position: Left-back

Team information
- Current team: FC 93 Bobigny
- Number: 7

Youth career
- 2003–2009: AAS Sarcelles
- 2009–2013: Caen

Senior career*
Years	Team	Apps	(Gls)
2013–2014	Caen B	19	(0)
2014	Ross County	0	(0)
2015–2016	Boulogne-Billancourt	10	(0)
2016–2017	L'Aumône	23	(1)
2017–2019	Entente SSG	59	(0)
2019–2020	Laval	25	(0)
2020–2022	Nancy	50	(1)
2023	Kauno Žalgiris	24	(0)
2023–2024	Oțelul Galați	7	(0)
2024	Villefranche	12	(1)
2024–	FC 93 Bobigny	2	(0)

International career^{‡}
2011	France U16	2	(0)
2023	Martinique	1	(0)
2025–	Mauritius	8	(0)
- * Club domestic league appearances and goals as of 30 November 2024 ‡ National team caps and goals as of 13 October 2025

Rosario Latouchent (born 21 March 1996) is a professional footballer who plays as a left-back for FC 93 Bobigny in the Championnat National 1, the fourth tier in the French football league system. Born in mainland France, he plays for the Mauritius national team.

== Club career ==
A youth product of Caen, Latouchent signed his first professional contract with Ross County in Scotland in 2014. He spent the next couple of years back in France playing for amateur sides, and eventually climbed up to the Ligue 2 with Nancy. Latouchent made his professional debut with Nancy in a 1–0 Ligue 2 win over Niort on 12 September 2020.

=== FK Kauno Žalgiris ===
On 13 February 2023, Latouchent announced that he signed with the Lithuanian Kauno Žalgiris Club.

== Personal life ==
Latouchent was born in France to a Martiniquais father and Mauritian mother.

== International stats ==
As of match played 14 October 2023

Appearances and goals by national team and year
National team	Year	Apps	Goals
Martinique	2023	1	0
Total		1	0
