= Pablo Gaitán =

Argentine footballer

Personal information
- Full name: Pablo Leonel Gaitán
- Date of birth: 9 May 1992 (age 34)
- Place of birth: Capitán Bermúdez, Argentina
- Height: 1.77 m (5 ft 10 in)
- Position: Midfielder

Team information
- Current team: Birkirkara
- Number: 6

Youth career
- Atlético de Rafaela

Senior career*
Years	Team	Apps	(Gls)
2012–2015	Atlético de Rafaela	4	(0)
2016–2018	Unión de Sunchales	64	(14)
2018–2019	Atlético de Rafaela	1	(0)
2019	→ General Díaz (loan)	22	(2)
2020–2021	General Díaz	17	(1)
2021	Politehnica Iași	11	(1)
2021–2023	Gloria Buzău	48	(6)
2023–2024	Oțelul Galați	3	(1)
2024–	Birkirkara	23	(1)
- * Club domestic league appearances and goals as of 6 October 2025

Pablo Leonel Gaitán (born 9 May 1992) is an Argentine professional footballer who plays as a midfielder for Maltese Premier League club Birkirkara.

== Career ==
Gaitán's career began with Primera División side Atlético de Rafaela. He was moved into the club's senior squad at the beginning of 2012, featuring in Copa Argentina matches with Banfield and Atlético Tucumán. He made his professional league debut in the following campaign of 2012–13, with interim manager Víctor Bottaniz selecting him for the full duration of a 3–0 defeat away to Newell's Old Boys on 3 December 2012. He remained with the club for three years, making eight appearances in all competitions. 2016 saw Gaitán join Unión de Sunchales. His first career goal arrived on 27 March against Sportivo Las Parejas.

After sixteen further goals for Unión de Sunchales across the 2016, 2016–17 and 2017–18 seasons, Gaitán departed in June 2018 to rejoin Atlético de Rafaela; a team now in Primera B Nacional. On 9 January 2019, Gaitán was loaned out to General Díaz in Paraguay for the 2019 season, where his older brother Cristián Gaitán also played at the time.

On 19 June 2023, Gaitán signed a one-year contract, with an option to extend it, with Romanian side Oțelul Galați.

== Personal life ==
Gaitán's brother, Cristián, is a fellow professional footballer.

== Honours ==
Oțelul Galați

- Cupa României runner-up: 2023–24
