= François Yabré =

Burkinabé international footballer (born 1991)

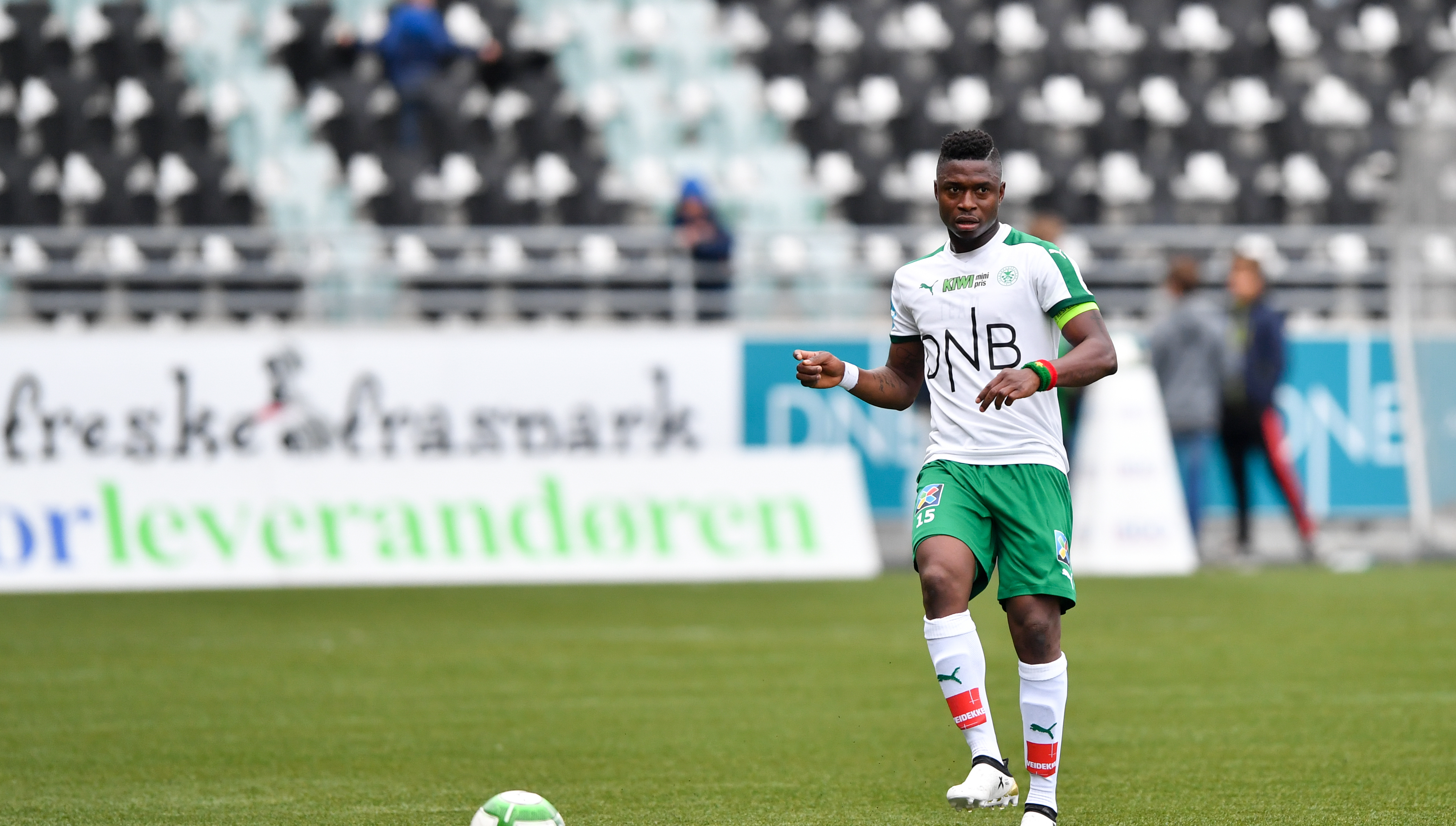

Personal information
- Full name: François Yabré Tobasegnou
- Date of birth: 10 May 1991 (age 35)
- Place of birth: Guitry, Ivory Coast
- Position: Defender

Team information
- Current team: Bihor Oradea
- Number: 55

Senior career*
Years	Team	Apps	(Gls)
2009	Mjøndalen	2	(0)
2010–2013	Strømmen	78	(3)
2014–2015	Kongsvinger	51	(5)
2016–2018	HamKam	43	(3)
2018	Mjølner	22	(1)
2019	Luceafărul Oradea	15	(1)
2019–2020	Viitorul Târgu Jiu	20	(1)
2020	Aerostar Bacău	7	(0)
2021–2025	Oțelul Galați	74	(3)
2025–	Bihor Oradea	6	(0)

International career
2013	Burkina Faso	1	(0)
- * Club domestic league appearances and goals as of 10 May 2025

François Yabré Tobasegnou (born 10 May 1991) is a Burkinabé professional footballer who plays as a defender for Liga II club Bihor Oradea.

== Club career ==
Yabré has played club football for Mjøndalen, Strømmen and Kongsvinger. Ahead of the 2016 season he went on to HamKam. In 2018 he signed for FK Mjølner. He left the club again at the end of the year. He then played for Romanian club Luceafărul Oradea, signing for them in 2019, and leaving the club in 2020.

In August 2020 he signed for Aerostar Bacău. Later that season he moved to Oțelul Galați.

In January 2025 he signed for Romanian Liga II club Bihor Oradea, after four years with Oțelul Galați.

== International career ==
He made his international debut for Burkina Faso in 2013, his only cap to date.

== Honours ==
Oțelul Galați

- Cupa României runner-up: 2023–24
- Liga III: 2021–22
