= Vasile Jardan =

Moldovan footballer

Personal information
- Date of birth: 20 July 1993 (age 33)
- Place of birth: Chișinău, Moldova
- Height: 1.78 m (5 ft 10 in)
- Position: Midfielder

Team information
- Current team: Milsami Orhei
- Number: 22

Youth career
- –2012: Dacia Chișinău

Senior career*
Years	Team	Apps	(Gls)
2012–2017	Dacia Chișinău	44	(0)
2015–2016	→ Academia Chișinău (loan)	20	(1)
2017	→ Dinamo-Auto (loan)	10	(1)
2017–2021	Milsami Orhei	66	(7)
2021–2024	Oțelul Galați	78	(15)
2024–2025	Petrocub Hîncești	11	(0)
2025–	Milsami Orhei	0	(0)

International career
2011–2012	Moldova U19	3	(0)
2013–2014	Moldova U21	22	(0)
- * Club domestic league appearances and goals as of 18 January 2025

Vasile Jardan (born 20 July 1993) is a Moldovan footballer who plays as a defensive midfielder for Moldovan Liga club Milsami Orhei.

== Honours ==
Dacia Chișinău

- Moldovan Cup runner-up: 2014–15

Milsami Orhei

- Moldovan Cup: 2017–18
- Moldovan Super Cup: 2019

Oțelul Galați

- Cupa României runner-up: 2023–24
- Liga III: 2021–22
