= Relu Stoian =

Romanian footballer

Personal information
- Full name: Relu Marian Stoian
- Date of birth: 1 March 1996 (age 30)
- Place of birth: Voluntari, Romania
- Height: 1.86 m (6 ft 1 in)
- Position: Goalkeeper

Youth career
- –2008: AC Proluceafărul
- 2009–2011: Gheorghe Hagi Academy
- 2011–2014: Honvéd

Senior career*
Years	Team	Apps	(Gls)
2014–2016	Honvéd	0	(0)
2015–2016	→ Berceni (loan)	24	(0)
2016–2018	Juventus București	43	(0)
2018–2019	Sepsi OSK	0	(0)
2019–2023	Gloria Buzău	78	(0)
2023–2024	Oțelul Galați	12	(0)
2024–2025	Universitatea Craiova	0	(0)
2025–2026	Metalul Buzău	9	(0)

International career
2017	Romania U21	1	(0)
- * Club domestic league appearances and goals as of 2 May 2026

Relu Marian Stoian (born 1 March 1996) is a Romanian professional footballer who plays as a goalkeeper.

== Honours ==
Juventus Bucureşti

- Liga II: 2016–17

Oțelul Galați

- Cupa României runner-up: 2023–24
