= Marius Coman =

Romanian professional footballer

Personal information
- Full name: Marius Cătălin Coman
- Date of birth: 31 July 1996 (age 30)
- Place of birth: Vișeu de Sus, Romania
- Height: 1.85 m (6 ft 1 in)
- Position: Forward

Team information
- Current team: UTA Arad
- Number: 9

Youth career
- –2013: Gernika
- 2013: CFR Cluj

Senior career*
Years	Team	Apps	(Gls)
2013–2015	FCM Baia Mare		
2015–2016	Bucovina Pojorâta	33	(14)
2016–2017	Academica Clinceni	27	(8)
2017–2018	CFR Cluj	4	(0)
2018–2021	Universitatea Cluj	23	(3)
2019	→ CSM Reșița (loan)	18	(3)
2020–2021	→ Comuna Recea (loan)	23	(15)
2021–2022	Petrolul Ploiești	2	(0)
2022–2024	Corvinul Hunedoara	28	(10)
2024–2026	Sepsi OSK	41	(4)
2025–2026	→ UTA Arad (loan)	29	(8)
2026–	UTA Arad	15	(5)
- * Club domestic league appearances and goals as of 6 November 2026

Marius Cătălin Coman (born 31 July 1996) is a Romanian professional footballer who plays as a forward for Liga I club UTA Arad.

== Career statistics ==
=== Club ===
As of match played 6 November 2026

Club	Season	League			Cupa României		Europe		Other		Total	
Club	Season	Division	Apps	Goals	Apps	Goals	Apps	Goals	Apps	Goals	Apps	Goals
FCM Baia Mare	2013–14	Liga III	?	?	?	?	–		–		?	?
FCM Baia Mare	2014–15	Liga III	?	?	?	?	–		–		?	?
FCM Baia Mare	Total		?	?	?	?	–		–		?	?
Bucovina Pojorâta	2015–16	Liga II	33	14	1	0	–		–		34	14
Academica Clinceni	2016–17	Liga II	27	8	1	0	–		–		28	8
CFR Cluj	2017–18	Liga I	4	0	1	0	–		–		5	0
Universitatea Cluj	2018–19	Liga II	22	3	3	3	–		2 (Note: Appearances in Liga I promotion/relegation play-offs)	0	27	6
Universitatea Cluj	2019–20	Liga II	1	0	–		–		–		1	0
Universitatea Cluj	Total		23	3	3	3	–		2	0	28	6
CSM Reșița (loan)	2019–20	Liga II	18	3	0	0	–		–		18	3
Comuna Recea (loan)	2020–21	Liga II	23	15	0	0	–		–		23	5
Petrolul Ploiești	2021–22	Liga II	2	0	0	0	–		–		2	0
Corvinul Hunedoara	2022–23	Liga III	?	?	1	0	–		4 (Note: Appearances in Liga III promotion play-offs)	1	5	1
Corvinul Hunedoara	2023–24	Liga II	28	10	8	6	–		–		36	16
Corvinul Hunedoara	Total		28	10	9	6	–		4	1	41	17
Sepsi OSK	2024–25	Liga I	38	4	2	0	–		–		40	4
Sepsi OSK	2025–26	Liga II	3	0	–		–		–		3	0
Sepsi OSK	Total		41	4	2	0	–		–		43	4
UTA Arad (loan)	2025–26	Liga I	29	8	2	1	–		–		31	9
UTA Arad	2026–27	Liga I	15	5	2	0	–		–		17	5
UTA Arad	Total		44	13	4	1	–		–		48	14
Career total			243	70	21	10	–		6	1	270	71

== Honours ==
FCM Baia Mare

- Liga III: 2014–15

CFR Cluj

- Liga I: 2017–18

Petrolul Ploiești

- Liga II: 2021–22

Corvinul Hunedoara

- Liga III: 2022–23
- Cupa României: 2023–24
