= Gabriel David =

Romanian professional footballer

Personal information
- Full name: Eugen Gabriel David
- Date of birth: 11 February 2003 (age 23)
- Place of birth: Botoșani, Romania
- Height: 1.80 m (5 ft 11 in)
- Position: Midfielder

Team information
- Current team: Cetatea Suceava (on loan from Botoșani)
- Number: 33

Youth career
- –2022: Botoșani

Senior career*
Years	Team	Apps	(Gls)
2019–2023	Botoșani II		
2022–	Botoșani	60	(4)
2026–	→ Cetatea Suceava (loan)	12	(1)

International career^{‡}
2023–2024	Romania U20	5	(0)
- * Club domestic league appearances and goals as of 31 October 2026 ‡ National team caps and goals as of 26 March 2024

Eugen Gabriel David (born 11 February 2003) is a Romanian professional footballer who plays as a midfielder for Liga II club Cetatea Suceava, on loan from Liga I club Botoșani.
