= FC Botoșani =

Romanian football club

Botoșani
- Full name: Asociația Fotbal Club Botoșani
- Nicknames: Botoșănenii (The Botoșani People); Roș-alb-albaștri (The Red, White, and Blues); Moldovenii (The Moldavians)
- Short name: Botoșani
- Founded: 2001; 25 years ago
- Ground: Municipal
- Capacity: 7,782
- Owner: Valeriu Iftime
- President: Marian Ignat
- Head coach: Marius Croitoru
- League: Liga I
- 2025–26: Liga I, 10th of 16
- Website: fcbt.ro
Home colours	Away colours

Asociația Fotbal Club Botoșani (Romanian pronunciation: [botoˈʃanʲ]), commonly known as FC Botoșani or simply Botoșani, is a Romanian professional football club based in the city of Botoșani, Botoșani County, that competes in the Liga I, the top tier of Romanian football.

After several predecessor clubs and years of instability for the football scene in Botoșani, the club managed to materialise in 2001. In 2013, FC Botoșani became the first team from its county to ever be promoted to the top tier of the Romanian league system. It recorded its first European appearance in the 2015–16 UEFA Europa League season.

Botoșănenii play in predominantly white home kits, while their away equipment is generally blue. Their home ground is the 7,782-seater Botoșani Municipal Stadium.

== History ==
=== Predecessors ===
The first traces of organised football in Botoșani appear just after World War 1, when a team was established in 1919. 5 years later Venus Botoșani was founded, associated with the local Jewish Maccabi sports association. Venus made its first appearance in the Romanian football pyramid in the 1937–38 season, playing amateurishly in the Divizia C East.

Following World War II, the team underwent several name changes: Flamura Roșie ("Red Flame") in 1949, Textila ("The Textile Factory") in 1957, and Unirea ("The Union") in 1963, after which it became a regular presence in Divizia C. Throughout the 1950s and 1960s these names alternated before the team eventually settled on CS Botoșani in 1973. The team subsequently won the 1974–75 Divizia C and achieved its first promotion to Divizia B, although it was immediately relegated. Throughout the rest of the 1970s, the team would oscillate between Divizia C and Divizia B.

In the summer of 1979, CS Botoșani achieved its third promotion to Divizia B, and in the 1979–80 season season, they finished third in the league, the best performance the team had ever managed. After this season, results declined, and the team occupied places near the middle and bottom of the table. After eleven consecutive seasons in Divizia B, the team was relegated. In 1993, the club dropped from Divizia C to the county leagues and was eventually dissolved.

One of Romania's greatest ever players, Nicolae Dobrin, ended his career at CS Botoșani. He played for the team in the 1985–86 season and was also the team manager.

=== Founding and early years (2001–2013) ===
After the post-revolutionary period of turmoil and corruption that characterised Romania throughout the 1990s, and several attempts to form a new club - Fotbal Club Botoșani was founded in 2001 by two businessmen, Salavastru and Sfaițer, with support from the local council, and the club started to compete in Divizia C. In the summer of 2004, the club promoted to Divizia B.

In 2005 the president of the Administration Council, Valeriu Iftime, took over the main projects of the club after the French model. Therefore, the first team played in Divizia B, the second team, formed with youngsters, played in the third league. Also, the club has a centre for children and youths who are prepared for the future of the first team.

Since the 2005–06 season, the matches of FC Botoșani were transmitted live on the radio, on "Radio AS". Until the beginning of the season, not even a radio station transmitted live. FC Botoșani participated in the second division of the Romanian football for nine consecutive seasons. In the 2005–06 season it finished on the 4th place, which was the highest position obtained until the 2012–13 season, when FC Botoșani won the series and promoted for the first time in Liga 1.

=== Promotion to the first division and recent history (2013–present) ===
Chart showing the progress of FC Botoșani's league finishes from their founding in 2001 until present.

The main objective for the 2013–14 season was to avoid relegation. At the start of the season, FC Botoșani was the only first league team that had only Romanian players. FC Botoșani made their debut in Liga I on 21 July 2013, in a 0–0 draw against CFR Cluj, with eight newcomers in a top tier level of the starting eleven and played most of the match with nine-man as Ciprian Dinu received a red card in the ninth minute. The next matchday, on 26 July, saw FC Botoșani netting their first Liga I victory, in a 2–1 away win over Gaz Metan Mediaș. On 25 August, FC Botoșani beat 1–0 FC Vaslui to record their first ever home win in the top tier. However, after this record, Botoșani had a poor run and manager Cristian Popovici was sacked, letting the team on the 12th place, two points above relegation. Leontin Grozavu was named manager and lead the team to a tough fight to avoid relegation.

FC Botoșani started the next season with two important victories against Astra Giurgiu and Dinamo București, teams that fought for the championship title. At the end of the season they qualified for the first time ever in 2015–16 season of UEFA Europa League, because several clubs failed to obtain UEFA licences. After a 4–4 draw with Viitorul Constanța, Botoșani again finished in eighth place.

On 2 July 2015, FC Botoșani made their debut in European competitions, in the first qualifying round of UEFA Europa League in a 1–1 tie against Spartaki Tskhinvali in the first leg in Botoșani. In the second leg in Georgia, FC Botoșani netted their first European victory in a 3–1 win over Spartaki Tskhinvali to advance to the next round, where they met Legia Warsaw.

After their first qualification in the championship play-offs, FC Botoșani finished the 2019–20 season on the 4th place, thus achieving their best Liga I performance and, once again, qualifying for UEFA Europa League after 5 years since their last participation. They netted a 2–1 away victory against Kazakh side Ordabasy in the first round, before eventually being eliminated by Shkëndija of North Macedonia after a 0–1 home loss in the second round.

== Stadium ==
FC Botoșani plays its home matches at the Botoșani Municipal Stadium. It is located near the centre of the city, has a capacity of 7,782 seats and is equipped with an all-weather running track.

== Support ==
The ultras of FC Botoșani are organized under the name of Dark Hooligans, Renegații and BT Pride.

=== Rivalries ===
The main rivalry of Botoșani is with Foresta Suceava, but they recently developed a rivalry with Politehnica Iași.

== Honours ==
=== Domestic ===
==== Leagues ====
- Liga II
  - Winners (1): 2012–13
- Liga III
  - Winners (1): 2003–04

== Players ==
=== First-team squad ===
As of 7 September 2026

Note: Flags indicate national team as defined under FIFA eligibility rules; some limited exceptions apply. Players may hold more than one non-FIFA nationality.

No.	Pos.	Nation	Player
1	GK	ROU	David Dincă
2	DF	COD	Brian Bayeye
3	MF	MAW	Charles Petro
4	DF	ROU	Andrei Miron (Captain)
7	MF	ROU	Sebastian Mailat
8	MF	IRL	Roland Idowu
9	FW	ROU	Jovan Marković
10	FW	MDA	Ștefan Bodișteanu
11	FW	ROU	Zoran Mitrov
18	DF	ESP	Miguel Muñoz
21	MF	BRA	Lucas de Vega
22	FW	UKR	Mykola Kovtalyuk
23	DF	SEN	Djibril Diaw

No.	Pos.	Nation	Player
26	MF	FRA	Hervin Ongenda
27	GK	ROU	Ion Gurău
30	DF	ROU	Alexandru Țigănașu (Vice-captain)
37	MF	ROU	Mihai Bordeianu
41	FW	ROU	Andrei Dumiter
44	DF	BIH	Rijad Sadiku (4th captain)
67	MF	ALB	Enriko Papa
73	DF	ROU	Narcis Ilaș
77	MF	BRA	Gabriel Gama
82	GK	ROU	Iustin Filote
90	MF	ROU	Mario Preda
94	DF	FRA	Mamadou Diarra
99	GK	GRE	Giannis Anestis (3rd captain)

=== Dual registration ===
Note: Flags indicate national team as defined under FIFA eligibility rules; some limited exceptions apply. Players may hold more than one non-FIFA nationality.

No.	Pos.	Nation	Player
5	DF	ROU	Răzvan Creț (at Cetatea Suceava)
14	FW	ROU	George Șorodoc (at Cetatea Suceava)
15	MF	ROU	Denis Ștefan (at Cetatea Suceava)

No.	Pos.	Nation	Player
17	FW	ROU	Teodor Afilipoaie (at Cetatea Suceava)
25	DF	ROU	Alexandru Suchianu (at Cetatea Suceava)

=== Out on loan ===
Note: Flags indicate national team as defined under FIFA eligibility rules; some limited exceptions apply. Players may hold more than one non-FIFA nationality.

No.	Pos.	Nation	Player
33	MF	ROU	Gabriel David (at Cetatea Suceava until 30 June 2027)
75	MF	ROU	David Ciurel (at Ghiroda until 30 June 2027)
—	GK	ROU	Alin Ciobanu (at Cetatea Suceava until 30 June 2027)
—	DF	ROU	Alberto Brașoveanu (at CSM Sighetu Marmației until 30 June 2027)

No.	Pos.	Nation	Player
—	DF	ROU	Mario Feraru (at CSM Adjud 1946 until 30 June 2027)
—	FW	ROU	Alexandru Cîmpanu (at Chongqing Tonglianglong until 31 December 2026)
—	FW	ROU	Adrian Răuțu (at Pașcani until 30 June 2027)

== Club officials ==
=== Board of directors ===
Role	Name
Owner	(Romania) Valeriu Iftime
President	(Romania) Marian Ignat
Vice-president	(Romania) Petru Parfenov
Board Members	(Romania) Ovidiu Jitaru (Romania) Doru Popa (Romania) Petru Parfenov
Administrative Director	(Romania) Dumitru Brânză
Marketing Director	(Romania) Cristian Postolache
Technical Director	(Romania) Mihai Ciobanu
Sporting Director	(Romania) Daniel Șchiopu
Marketing Agent	(Romania) Cristinel Bursuc
Youth Center Director	(Romania) Alexandru Chirilă
Youth Center Coordinator	(Romania) Tiberiu Honciuc
Press Officer	(Romania) Cristian Prisăcariu
Responsible for Order and Safety	(Romania) Ioan Dănilă
Team Manager	(Romania) Mihai Roman

- Last updated: 3 September 2024

=== Current technical staff ===
Role	Name
Head coach	(Romania) Marius Croitoru
Assistant coaches	(Romania) Andrei Patache (Romania) Codrin Mindirigiu
Goalkeeping coach	(Romania) Alin Bordeanu
Fitness coach	(Romania) Ovidiu Chiribici
Video analyst	(Romania) Lucian Purice
Club doctors	(Romania) Ioana Iftime (Romania) Eduard Gurău
Medical assistant	(Romania) Daniel Hodinescu
Kinetotherapist	(Romania) Dumitru Brânză
Masseur	(Romania) Silviu Siminiciuc

- Last updated: 14 August 2026

== Records and statistics ==
=== European Cups history ===
Season	Competition	Round	Club	Home	Away	Aggregate
2015–16	UEFA Europa League	1Q	(Georgia (country)) Spartaki Tskhinvali	1–1	3–1	4–2
2015–16	UEFA Europa League	2Q	(Poland) Legia Warsaw	0–3	0–1	0–4
2020–21	UEFA Europa League	1Q	(Kazakhstan) Ordabasy	—N/a	2–1	—N/a
2020–21	UEFA Europa League	2Q	(North Macedonia) Shkëndija	0–1	—N/a	—N/a

Notes

- 1Q: First qualifying round
- 2Q: Second qualifying round
- 3Q: Third qualifying round
- PO: Play-off round

=== European cups all-time statistics ===
As of 17 September 2020

Competition	S	P	W	D	L	GF	GA	GD
UEFA Europa League	2	6	2	1	3	6	8	−2
Total	2	6	2	1	3	6	8	−2

=== League history ===
Season	Tier	Division	Place	National Cup
2026–27	1	Liga I	TBD	TBD
2025–26	1	Liga I	10th	Group Stage
2024–25	1	Liga I	12th	Group stage
2023–24	1	Liga I	14th (O)	Group Stage
2022–23	1	Liga I	12th	Group Stage
2021–22	1	Liga I	8th	Round of 32
2020–21	1	Liga I	6th	Round of 16
2019–20	1	Liga I	4th	Round of 16
2018–19	1	Liga I	8th	Round of 32
2017–18	1	Liga I	8th	Semi-finals
2016–17	1	Liga I	10th	Round of 32
2015–16	1	Liga I	9th	Round of 16
2014–15	1	Liga I	8th	Round of 32

Season	Tier	Division	Place	National Cup
2013–14	1	Liga I	8th	Round of 16
2012–13	2	Liga II (Seria I)	1st (C, P)	Round of 32
2011–12	2	Liga II (Seria I)	5th	Fourth Round
2010–11	2	Liga II (Seria I)	7th	Fourth Round
2009–10	2	Liga II (Seria I)	10th	Fifth Round
2008–09	2	Liga II (Seria I)	5th	Round of 16
2007–08	2	Liga II (Seria I)	9th	
2006–07	2	Liga II (Seria I)	11th	
2005–06	2	Divizia B (Seria I)	4th	
2004–05	2	Divizia B (Seria I)	8th	Round of 32
2003–04	3	Divizia C (Seria I)	1st (C, P)	
2002–03	3	Divizia C (Seria I)	6th	
2001–02	3	Divizia C (Seria I)	2nd	

== Notable former players ==
The footballers enlisted below have had international cap(s) for their respective countries at junior and/or senior level and/or more than 50 caps for FC Botoșani.

Romania

- (Romania) Florin Acsinte
- (Romania) Ștefan Apostol
- (Romania) Paul Batin
- (Romania) Romario Benzar
- (Romania) Valeriu Bordeanu
- (Romania) Andrei Burcă
- (Romania) Laurențiu Buș
- (Romania) George Cârjan
- (Romania) Andrei Chindriș
- (Romania) Alberto Cobrea
- (Romania) Marius Croitoru
- (Romania) Stelian Cucu
- (Romania) Vasile Curileac
- (Romania) Victor Dican
- (Romania) Ciprian Dinu
- (Romania) Andrei Dragu
- (Romania) Andrei Dumitraș
- (Romania) Eduard Florescu
- (Romania) István Fülöp
- (Romania) Lóránd Fülöp
- (Romania) Attila Hadnagy
- (Romania) Denis Haruț
- (Romania) Cătălin Golofca
- (Romania) David Lazar
- (Romania) Olimpiu Moruțan
- (Romania) Nicolae Mușat
- (Romania) Răzvan Oaidă
- (Romania) Eduard Pap
- (Romania) Paul Papp
- (Romania) Andrei Patache
- (Romania) Florin Plămadă
- (Romania) Bogdan Racovițan
- (Romania) Mihai Roman I
- (Romania) Mihai Roman II
- (Romania) Alin Șeroni
- (Romania) Răzvan Tincu
- (Romania) Gabriel Vașvari

Albania

- (Albania) Realdo Fili

Angola

- (Angola) Aldaír

Argentina

- (Argentina) Enzo López
- (Argentina) Patricio Matricardi
- (Argentina) Jonathan Rodríguez

Bulgaria

- (Bulgaria) Radoslav Dimitrov
- (Bulgaria) Plamen Iliev

Cameroon

- (Cameroon) Joyskim Dawa
- (Cameroon) Michael Ngadeu-Ngadjui

Croatia

- (Croatia) Marko Dugandžić

Curaçao

- (Curaçao) Quenten Martinus

France

- (France) Hamidou Keyta
- (France) Jaly Mouaddib

Germany

- (Germany) Christopher Braun
- (Germany) Reagy Ofosu

Greece

- (Greece) Aristidis Soiledis

Guinea

- (Guinea) Sekou Camara

Italy

- (Italy) Diego Fabbrini

Lithuania

- (Lithuania) Deivydas Matulevičius

Nigeria

- (Nigeria) Friday Adams
- (Nigeria) Junior Pius

North Macedonia

- (North Macedonia) Stefan Ashkovski

Slovenia

- (Slovenia) Michael Pavlović

Syria

- (Syria) Mahmoud Al-Mawas

== Notable former managers ==
- (Romania) Liviu Ciobotariu
- (Romania) Costel Enache
- (Romania) Leo Grozavu
- (Romania) Cristian Pustai
- (Romania) Cristian Popovici
