= Victor Dican =

Romanian footballer

Personal information
- Full name: Victor Robert Dican
- Date of birth: 11 October 2000 (age 26)
- Place of birth: Râmnicu Vâlcea, Romania
- Height: 1.89 m (6 ft 2 in)
- Positions: Defensive midfielder; centre-back

Team information
- Current team: Farul Constanța
- Number: 6

Youth career
- 2006–2009: Teruel
- 2009–2013: Damila Măciuca
- 2013–2018: SCM Râmnicu Vâlcea

Senior career*
Years	Team	Apps	(Gls)
2018–2019	Metalurgistul Cugir	26	(3)
2019–2022	Universitatea Cluj	50	(9)
2022–2024	Botoșani	92	(6)
2024–	Farul Constanța	82	(6)

International career
2021–2023	Romania U21	12	(0)
- * Club domestic league appearances and goals as of 7 November 2026

Victor Robert Dican (born 11 October 2000) is a Romanian professional footballer who plays as a defensive midfielder or centre-back for Liga I club Farul Constanța.

== Club career ==
=== FC Botoșani ===
He made his league debut on 31 January 2022 in Liga I match against CFR Cluj.

== Career statistics ==
As of match played 7 November 2026

Appearances and goals by club, season and competition
Club	Season	League			Cupa României		Europe		Other		Total	
Club	Season	Division	Apps	Goals	Apps	Goals	Apps	Goals	Apps	Goals	Apps	Goals
Metalurgistul Cugir	2018–19	Liga III	26	3	0	0	—		—		26	3
Universitatea Cluj	2019–20	Liga II	20	3	2	0	—		—		22	3
Universitatea Cluj	2020–21	Liga II	14	4	4	1	—		—		18	5
Universitatea Cluj	2021–22	Liga II	16	2	1	0	—		—		17	2
Universitatea Cluj	Total		50	9	7	1	—		—		57	10
Botoșani	2021–22	Liga I	17	2	—		—		1 (Note: Appearance in Liga I European play-offs)	0	18	2
Botoșani	2022–23	Liga I	38	1	3	0	—		—		41	1
Botoșani	2023–24	Liga I	37	3	3	0	—		2 (Note: Appearances in Liga I promotion/relegation play-offs)	0	42	3
Botoșani	Total		92	6	6	0	—		3	0	101	6
Farul Constanța	2024–25	Liga I	37	4	5	0	—		—		42	4
Farul Constanța	2025–26	Liga I	31	2	3	0	—		2	0	36	2
Farul Constanța	2026–27	Liga I	14	0	0	0	—		—		14	0
Farul Constanța	Total		82	6	8	0	—		2	0	92	6
Career total			250	24	21	1	—		5	0	276	25
