= Miguel Silva (footballer, born December 1995) =

Portuguese footballer

Personal information
- Full name: Miguel Ângelo Gomes da Silva
- Date of birth: 20 December 1995 (age 30)
- Place of birth: Fiães, Portugal
- Height: 1.91 m (6 ft 3 in)
- Positions: Left-back; winger

Team information
- Current team: Oțelul Galați
- Number: 28

Youth career
- 2003–2009: Fiães
- 2009–2014: Feirense

Senior career*
Years	Team	Apps	(Gls)
2014–2015	Feirense	0	(0)
2014–2015	→ São João de Ver (loan)	16	(2)
2015–2017	Estarreja	48	(10)
2017–2018	Águeda	26	(1)
2018–2020	Oliveirense	27	(3)
2020–2022	São João de Ver	50	(7)
2022–2023	Leixões	27	(1)
2023–2025	Oțelul Galați	54	(1)
2025–2026	Universitatea Cluj	21	(1)
2026–	Oțelul Galați	9	(1)
- * Club domestic league appearances and goals as of 1 November 2026

Miguel Ângelo Gomes da Silva (born 20 December 1995) is a Portuguese professional footballer who plays as a left-back or winger for Liga I club Oțelul Galați.

== Club career ==
On 28 July 2018, Silva made his professional debut with Oliveirense in a 2018–19 Taça da Liga match against Belenenses.

== Career statistics ==
=== Club ===
As of match played 1 November 2026

Appearances and goals by club, season and competition
Club	Season	League			National cup (Note: Includes Taça de Portugal, Cupa României)		Europe		Other		Total	
Club	Season	Division	Apps	Goals	Apps	Goals	Apps	Goals	Apps	Goals	Apps	Goals
São João de Ver (loan)	2014–15	Campeonato Nacional de Seniores	16	2	0	0	—		—		16	2
Estarreja	2015–16	Campeonato de Portugal	19	7	1	0	—		—		20	7
Estarreja	2016–17	Campeonato de Portugal	29	3	3	1	—		—		32	4
Estarreja	Total		48	10	4	1	—		—		52	11
Águeda	2017–18	Campeonato de Portugal	26	1	0	0	—		—		26	1
Oliveirense	2018–19	LigaPro	8	3	1	0	—		1 (Note: Appearances in Taça da Liga)	0	10	3
Oliveirense	2019–20	LigaPro	19	0	1	0	—		2	0	22	0
Oliveirense	Total		27	3	2	0	—		3	0	32	3
São João de Ver	2020–21	Campeonato de Portugal	24	5	2	0	—		—		26	5
São João de Ver	2022–23	Liga 3	26	2	1	0	—		—		27	2
São João de Ver	Total		50	7	3	0	—		—		53	7
Leixões	2022–23	Liga Portugal 2	27	1	2	0	—		3	1	32	2
Leixões	2023–24	Liga Portugal 2	0	0	—		—		1	0	1	0
Leixões	Total		27	1	2	0	—		4	1	33	2
Oțelul Galați	2023–24	Liga I	27	0	6	0	—		1 (Note: Appearance in Liga I European play-offs)	0	34	0
Oțelul Galați	2024–25	Liga I	27	1	1	0	—		—		28	1
Oțelul Galați	Total		54	1	7	0	—		1	0	62	1
Universitatea Cluj	2025–26	Liga I	21	1	2	0	2 (Note: Appearances in UEFA Conference League)	0	—		25	1
Universitatea Cluj	2026–27	Liga I	0	0	—		0	0	0	0	0	0
Universitatea Cluj	Total		21	1	2	0	2	0	0	0	25	1
Oțelul Galați	2026–27	Liga I	9	1	1	0	—		—		10	1
Career total			278	27	21	1	2	0	8	1	309	29

== Honours ==
Oțelul Galați

- Cupa României runner-up: 2023–24

Universitatea Cluj

- Cupa României runner-up: 2025–26
- Supercupa României runner-up: 2026
