= Anes Rušević =

Serbian footballer

Personal information
- Date of birth: 2 December 1996 (age 29)
- Place of birth: Novi Pazar, FR Yugoslavia
- Height: 1.83 m (6 ft 0 in)
- Position: Forward

Team information
- Current team: Novi Pazar
- Number: 11

Youth career
- –2014: Novi Pazar

Senior career*
Years	Team	Apps	(Gls)
2015–2017	Novi Pazar	39	(6)
2017	BATE Borisov	12	(1)
2018–2019	Napredak Kruševac	27	(3)
2019–2020	Proleter Novi Sad	20	(2)
2020–2021	Javor Ivanjica	30	(1)
2022–2023	Rabotnički	40	(12)
2023	Zhetysu	13	(6)
2024	Oțelul Galați	15	(1)
2024	Zrinjski Mostar	2	(0)
2025	Rabotnički	13	(3)
2025	Iberia 1999	1	(0)
2026–	Novi Pazar	6	(0)

International career
2016	Serbia U20	1	(0)
2017	Serbia U21	1	(0)
- * Club domestic league appearances and goals as of 12 June 2026

Anes Rušević (Serbian Cyrillic: Анес Рушевић; born 2 December 1996) is a Serbian professional footballer who plays as a forward for Serbian SuperLiga club Novi Pazar.

== Career ==
He started his career at his hometown football club FK Novi Pazar, playing there until January 2017 after being transferred to BATE Borisov.

== Honours ==
BATE Borisov

- Belarusian Premier League: 2017
- Belarusian Super Cup: 2017

Oțelul Galați

- Cupa României runner-up: 2023–24
