= Eduard Pap =

Romanian footballer

Personal information
- Full name: Eduard Adrian Pap
- Date of birth: 1 July 1994 (age 32)
- Place of birth: Jimbolia, Romania
- Height: 1.82 m (6 ft 0 in)
- Position: Goalkeeper

Team information
- Current team: FK Csíkszereda
- Number: 94

Youth career
- 2007–2013: Școala de Fotbal Marcel Băban Jimbolia

Senior career*
Years	Team	Apps	(Gls)
2013–2015	ACS Poli Timișoara	24	(0)
2016	Luceafărul Oradea	26	(0)
2017	ASA Târgu Mureș	17	(0)
2017–2023	Botoșani	140	(0)
2023–2024	Győr	8	(0)
2024	Oțelul Galați	13	(0)
2024–2025	Botoșani	7	(0)
2025	Dumbrăvița	8	(0)
2025–	FK Csíkszereda	52	(0)

International career
2012	Romania U19	1	(0)
- * Club domestic league appearances and goals as of 7 November 2026

Eduard Adrian Pap (born 1 July 1994) is a Romanian professional footballer who plays as a goalkeeper for Liga I club FK Csíkszereda.

== Club career ==
Pap made his debut in professional football against UTA Arad, in 2013. He went on to keep a clean sheet in his first Liga I match, facing CFR Cluj.

== Career statistics ==
As of 7 November 2026

Appearances and goals by club, season and competition
Club	Season	League			National cup (Note: Includes Cupa României, Magyar Kupa)		Europe		Other		Total	
Club	Season	Division	Apps	Goals	Apps	Goals	Apps	Goals	Apps	Goals	Apps	Goals
ACS Poli Timișoara	2012–13	Liga II	4	0	0	0	—		—		4	0
ACS Poli Timișoara	2013–14	Liga I	2	0	1	0	—		—		3	0
ACS Poli Timișoara	2014–15	Liga II	15	0	0	0	—		—		15	0
ACS Poli Timișoara	2015–16	Liga I	3	0	0	0	—		0	0	3	0
ACS Poli Timișoara	Total		24	0	1	0	—		—		25	0
Luceafărul Oradea	2015–16	Liga III	10	0	—		—		—		10	0
Luceafărul Oradea	2016–17	Liga II	16	0	1	0	—		—		17	0
Luceafărul Oradea	Total		26	0	1	0	—		—		27	0
ASA Târgu Mureș	2016–17	Liga I	17	0	—		—		0	0	17	0
Botoșani	2017–18	Liga I	7	0	4	0	—		—		11	0
Botoșani	2018–19	Liga I	23	0	0	0	—		—		23	0
Botoșani	2019–20	Liga I	26	0	0	0	—		—		26	0
Botoșani	2020–21	Liga I	17	0	2	0	2 (Note: Appearances in UEFA Europa League)	0	—		21	0
Botoșani	2021–22	Liga I	37	0	1	0	—		1 (Note: Appearances in Liga I European play-offs)	0	9	0
Botoșani	2022–23	Liga I	30	0	0	0	—		—		30	0
Botoșani	Total		140	0	7	0	2	0	1	0	150	0
Győr	2023–24	Nemzeti Bajnokság II	8	0	1	0	—		—		9	0
Oțelul Galați	2023–24	Liga I	13	0	3	0	—		1	0	17	0
Botoșani	2024–25	Liga I	7	0	4	0	—		—		11	0
Dumbrăvița	2024–25	Liga II	8	0	—		—		—		8	0
FK Csíkszereda	2025–26	Liga I	37	0	0	0	—		—		37	0
FK Csíkszereda	2026–27	Liga I	15	0	1	0	—		—		16	0
FK Csíkszereda	Total		52	0	1	0	—		—		53	0
Career total			295	0	18	0	2	0	2	0	317	0

== Honours ==
ACS Poli Timișoara

- Liga II: 2014–15

Luceafărul Oradea

- Liga III: 2015–16

Oțelul Galați

- Cupa României runner-up: 2023–24
