= Diego Živulić =

Croatian footballer

Personal information
- Date of birth: 23 March 1992 (age 34)
- Place of birth: Rijeka, Croatia
- Height: 1.87 m (6 ft 2 in)
- Positions: Defensive midfielder; centre-back

Team information
- Current team: East Bengal

Youth career
- 1998–2003: Novigrad
- 2003–2008: Jadran Poreč
- 2008–2011: Rijeka

Senior career*
Years	Team	Apps	(Gls)
2010–2014	Rijeka	9	(0)
2010	→ Orijent (loan)	11	(2)
2010	→ Pomorac (loan)	0	(0)
2012–2014	→ Pomorac (loan)	47	(2)
2014–2017	Zlín	60	(4)
2017–2018	Viktoria Plzeň	10	(0)
2018–2019	Pafos	26	(0)
2019	Śląsk Wrocław II	1	(0)
2019–2021	Śląsk Wrocław	19	(0)
2021–2022	Diósgyőr	10	(0)
2022	Bregalnica Štip	8	(0)
2022–2023	Tabor Sežana	13	(0)
2023–2026	Oțelul Galați	116	(3)
2026	Rudeš	3	(0)
2026–	East Bengal	0	(0)

International career
2010	Croatia U18	6	(0)
2010–2011	Croatia U19	14	(0)
- * Club domestic league appearances and goals as of 2 August 2026

Diego Živulić (Croatian pronunciation: [ʒǐʋulitɕ]; born 23 March 1992) is a Croatian professional footballer who plays as a defensive midfielder or a centre-back for Indian Super League club East Bengal.

== Career ==
Živulić started training at his local club Novigrad, before moving on to nearby Jadran Poreč. At the age of 16, he was snapped up by the first-tier club Rijeka. After being voted the best player of the Kvarnerska Rivijera tournament, he was sent on loan to the third-tier side Orijent in 2010, and later to the second-tier club Pomorac. At the same time, he also became a Croatian youth international, amassing 20 caps overall for the Croatia U18 and Croatia U19 teams.

In his first professional season, 2011–12, Živulić collected nine caps for Rijeka. In mid-2012, Rijeka loaned Živulić to Pomorac again, where he would remain until the end of his contract with the club, in 2014. That summer, he moved abroad, to the Czech second-tier club Zlín, with whom he achieved promotion to the Czech First League the following summer.

On 1 August 2019, Živulić joined Polish club Śląsk Wrocław.

Živulić joined Indian Super League club East Bengal in August 2026 on a one-year deal.

== Personal life ==
Živulić studied at the Faculty of Economy at the University of Rijeka.

== Honours ==
Fastav Zlín

- Czech Cup: 2016–17
- Czechoslovak Supercup: 2017

Viktoria Plzeň

- Czech First League: 2017–18

Śląsk Wrocław II

- III liga, gr. III: 2019–20

Oțelul Galați

- Cupa României runner-up: 2023–24
