= 2023–24 Cupa României =

Cupa României 2023–24

Tournament details
- Country: Romania

Final positions
- Champions: Corvinul Hunedoara
- Runners-up: Oțelul Galați
- Europa League: Corvinul Hunedoara

The 2023–24 Cupa României is the 86th season of the annual Romanian primary football knockout tournament. The winner will qualify for the first qualifying round of the 2024–25 UEFA Europa League. It is the second season in which the Round of 16 was replaced by a play-off, immediately followed by a group stage. After the group stage, the classic Quarter-Finals format continues.

== Round dates ==
Phase	Round	Clubs remaining	Clubs involved	From previous round	Entries in this round	Dates	Teams entering this round
First stage	Regional qualifiers	167	42	none	42	Group Stage 12, 15, 19 July 2023; Finals 22 July 2023	42 Liga IV teams
First stage	First Round	132	76	7	69	2 August 2023	69 Liga III teams
First stage	Second Round	94	60	38	22	9 August 2023	16 Liga III teams 4 Liga II relegated teams 2 Liga II current teams
First stage	Third Round	64	48	30	18	16–17 August 2023	18 Liga II teams
First stage	Play-off Round	40	32	24	8	30 August 2023	8 Liga I teams (9-16)
Second stage	Group Stage	24	24	16	8	27 September 2023; 1 November 2023; 6 December 2023	8 Liga I teams (1-8)
Third stage	Quarter-finals	8	8	8	None	3 April 2024	None
Third stage	Semi-finals	4	4	4	None	24 April 2024	None
Third stage	Final	2	2	2	None	15 May 2024	None

== First Stage ==
=== Second Round ===
The draw for the 2nd round took place on August 3, with the matches taking place on August 9.

9 August 2023	Viitorul Ianca (3)	1–0	Unirea Braniștea (3)	Plopu, Ianca
17:30 EEST EEST				Stadium: Stadionul Plopu; Referee: Porumbel Valentin

9 August 2023	Lotus Băile Felix (3)	0–3	Bihor Oradea (3)	Sânmartin
17:30 EEST EEST				Stadium: Comunal; Referee: Kemenes Norbert

9 August 2023	Crișul Chișineu-Criș (4)	0–2	Șoimii Lipova (3)	Chișineu-Criș
17:30 EEST EEST				Stadium: Crișul; Referee: Codrea Cristian

9 August 2023	ACB Ineu (3)	0–3	Progresul Pecica (3)	Pecica (Note: The match was scheduled to be played in Ineu but due to pitch works at the Central-Parc Stadium, the teams agreed to play the match in Pecica)
17:30 EEST EEST				Stadium: Progresul; Referee: Salomir Mircea

9 August 2023	Sănătatea Cluj (3)	1–0	Viitorul Cluj (3)	Cluj-Napoca
17:30 EEST EEST				Stadium: Clujana; Referee: Suvar Alexandru Nicolae

9 August 2023	SCM Zalău (3)	2–1	Gloria Bistrița (3)	Zalău
17:30 EEST EEST				Stadium: Municipal; Referee: Chioran Marius Nechita

9 August 2023	Olimpia Satu Mare (3)	2–3	Minaur Baia Mare (3)	Satu Mare
17:30 EEST EEST				Stadium: Daniel Prodan; Referee: Lunca Dragoș Nicolae

9 August 2023	Odorheiu Secuiesc (3)	2–0	FC Brașov (3)	Odorheiu Secuiesc
17:30 EEST EEST				Stadium: Municipal; Referee: Neculcea Bogdan

9 August 2023	ACS Tg. Mureş (3)	1–2	Unirea Ungheni (3)	Târgu Mureș
17:30 EEST EEST				Stadium: Academia de Sport Mureşul; Referee: Ștef Claudiu

9 August 2023	Universitar din Alba Iulia (3)	4–3 (a.e.t.)	Metalurgistul Cugir (3)	Sântimbru
17:30 EEST EEST				Stadium: Comunal Galtiu; Referee: Fodor Andrei Gabriel

9 August 2023	Gloria Geoagiu (4)	0–2	CSM Deva (3)	Geoagiu
17:30 EEST EEST				Stadium: Orăşenesc; Referee: Pavel Adelin

9 August 2023	CSC Ghiroda (3)	2–0	Ripensia Timișoara (3)	Ghiroda
17:30 EEST EEST				Stadium: Emilian Pavel; Referee: Herczeg Leopold

9 August 2023	Phoenix Buziaş (3)	2–0 (a.e.t.)	Politehnica Timișoara (3)	Lugoj
17:30 EEST EEST				Stadium: Tineretului; Referee: Roman George Catalin

9 August 2023	Voința Lupac (3)	1–3	CSM Reșița (2)	Lupac
17:30 EEST EEST				Stadium: Voința; Referee: Buzarnescu Dan Stefan

9 August 2023	Jiul Petroșani (3)	2–0	Flacăra Horezu (3)	Petroșani
17:30 EEST EEST				Stadium: Petre Libardi; Referee: Anghelina Cristian

9 August 2023	Olimpic Zărnești (3)	0–3	Muscelul Câmpulung Elite (3)	Zărneşti
17:30 EEST EEST				Stadium: Celuloza; Referee: Marinescu Madalin

9 August 2023	SCM Râmnicu Vâlcea (3)	3–2 (a.e.t.)	Viitorul Dăești (3)	Râmnicu Vâlcea
17:30 EEST EEST				Stadium: Municipal; Referee: Olaru Constantin Alin

9 August 2023	Viitorul Șimian (3)	2–1	CSO Filiași (3)	Drobeta-Turnu Severin
17:30 EEST EEST				Stadium: Municipal; Referee: Avram Robert

9 August 2023	Vedița Colonești (3)	3–2 (a.e.t.)	Petrolul Potcoava (3)	Colonești
17:30 EEST EEST				Stadium: Mircea Stan; Referee: Belega Eduard

9 August 2023	Flacăra Moreni (3)	0–1	CSO Plopeni (3)	Moreni
17:30 EEST EEST				Stadium: Flacăra; Referee: Ene Mihai Laurențiu

9 August 2023	Unirea Bascov (3)	2–3 (a.e.t.)	CS Afumați (3)	Valea Ursului, Bascov
17:30 EEST EEST				Stadium: Comunal; Referee: Lăstun Mihail Sebastian

9 August 2023	Gloria Băneasa (3)	3–4	Dunărea Călărași (3)	Băneasa
17:30 EEST EEST				Stadium: Central; Referee: Ioniță Eduard

9 August 2023	Viitorul Ileana (4)	0–3 (Note: Popești-Leordeni were awarded the win as the hosts failed to properly organize the match, by not having an ambulance at the ground)	Popești-Leordeni (3)	Ileana
17:30 EEST EEST				Stadium: Comunal; Referee: Oancea Stanica Theodor

9 August 2023	CS Păulești (3)	0–5	Metalul Buzău (3)	Păulești
17:30 EEST EEST				Stadium: Comunal; Referee: Spinu Marius

9 August 2023	CSM Râmnicu Sărat (3)	2–2 (a.e.t.) (1–3 p)	CS Blejoi (3)	Râmnicu Sărat
17:30 EEST EEST				Stadium: Municipal; Referee: Burloiu Dorin

9 August 2023	Rapid Brodoc (3)	1–0	Sporting Liești (3)	Vaslui
17:30 EEST EEST				Stadium: Municipal; Referee: Baban Vlad

9 August 2023	FC Bacău (3)	9–1	CSM Bacău (3)	Ruși-Ciutea
17:30 EEST EEST				Stadium: Baza Sportivă FC Bacău; Referee: Baciu Andrei

9 August 2023	Șomuz Fălticeni (3)	0–3	Ceahlăul Piatra Neamț (2)	Fălticeni
17:30 EEST EEST				Stadium: Constantin Jamaischi; Referee: Mavriche Sergiu

9 August 2023	Bucovina Rădăuți (3)	1–1 (a.e.t.) (5–4 p)	Foresta Suceava (3)	Rădăuți
17:30 EEST EEST				Stadium: Municipal; Referee: Mihuleac Gabriel

9 August 2023	Axiopolis Cernavodă (3)	7–0	CS Amara (4)	Cernavodă
19:00 EEST EEST				Stadium: Ideal; Referee: Naidin Marius

=== Third Round ===
The draw for the 3rd round took place on August 10, with the matches taking place on August 16 and 17.

16 August 2023	Popești-Leordeni (3)	0–3	Metaloglobus București (2)	Popești-Leordeni
17:30 EEST				Stadium: Inter Gaz; Referee: Pavel Adelin

16 August 2023	SCM Zalău (3)	5–1	Minaur Baia Mare (3)	Zalău
17:30 EEST				Stadium: Municipal; Referee: Țurcanu Dragoș Ionuț

16 August 2023	Sănătatea Cluj (3)	0–2	Bihor Oradea (3)	Cluj-Napoca
17:30 EEST				Stadium: Clujana; Referee: Ciucanu Octavian

16 August 2023	Progresul Pecica (3)	2–1	Șoimii Lipova (3)	Pecica
17:30 EEST				Stadium: Progresul; Referee: Jurca Tudor Florin

16 August 2023	CS Unirea Ungheni (3)	2–3	Unirea Dej (2)	Ungheni
17:30 EEST				Stadium: Central; Referee: Bădărău Raul Sebastian

16 August 2023	CSC Ghiroda (3)	0–4	CSC Dumbrăvița (2)	Ghiroda
17:30 EEST				Stadium: Emilian Pavel; Referee: Codrea Cristian

16 August 2023	Phoenix Buziaș (3)	1–0	CSM Reșița (3)	Lugoj
17:30 EEST				Stadium: Municipal; Referee: Chioran Marius Nechita

16 August 2023	Viitorul Șimian (3)	1–0	Viitorul Târgu Jiu (2)	Drobeta-Turnu Severin
17:30 EEST				Stadium: Municipal; Referee: Buzarnescu Dan Stefan

16 August 2023	Universitar Alba Iulia (3)	0–0 (a.e.t.) (3–4 p)	CSM Deva (3)	Sîntimbru
17:30 EEST				Stadium: Comunal Galtiu; Referee: Omuţ Marius

16 August 2023	Jiul Petroșani (3)	1–4	Corvinul Hunedoara (2)	Petroșani
17:30 EEST				Stadium: Petre Libardi; Referee: Mazilu Florin Ovidiu

16 August 2023	Muscelul Câmpulung Elite (3)	1–4	CSC Șelimbăr (2)	Câmpulung
17:30 EEST				Stadium: Muscelul; Referee: Breoi Nicolae

16 August 2023	CSM Alexandria (2)	1–0	CSM Slatina (2)	Turnu Măgurele
17:30 EEST				Stadium: Municipal; Referee: Lăstun Mihail Sebastian

16 August 2023	CS Blejoi (3)	0–5	Chindia Târgoviște (2)	Blejoi
17:30 EEST				Stadium: Comunal; Referee: Pîrîu Dragoș

16 August 2023	CS Tunari (2)	4–0	Progresul Spartac (2)	Tunari
17:30 EEST				Stadium: Comunal; Referee: Motan Mihai

16 August 2023	CS Afumați (3)	0–1	Concordia Chiajna (2)	Afumați
17:30 EEST				Stadium: Comunal; Referee: Anton Sergiu

16 August 2023	Dunărea Călărași (3)	0–1	Steaua București (2)	Călărași
17:30 EEST				Stadium: Ion Comșa; Referee: Dănilă Ștefăniță

16 August 2023	Viitorul Ianca (3)	1–0	Metalul Buzău (3)	Ianca
17:30 EEST				Stadium: Ștefan Vrăbioru; Referee: Nanu Ionut Catalin

16 August 2023	CSO Plopeni (3)	0–2	Gloria Buzău (2)	Plopeni
17:30 EEST				Stadium: Gheorghe Șilaev; Referee: Robu Ovidiu

16 August 2023	FC Bacău (3)	2–0	Rapid Brodoc (3)	Ruși-Ciutea
17:30 EEST				Stadium: Baza Sportivă FC Bacău; Referee: Frățilă Adrian

16 August 2023	Odorheiu Secuiesc (3)	0–1	FK Csíkszereda (2)	Odorheiu Secuiesc
17:30 EEST				Stadium: Municipal; Referee: Mihuleac Gabriel

16 August 2023	Bucovina Rădăuți (3)	0–2	Ceahlăul Piatra Neamț (2)	Rădăuți
17:30 EEST				Stadium: Municipal; Referee: Constantinescu Ionut

16 August 2023	Axiopolis Cernavodă (3)	2–4	Unirea Slobozia (2)	Cernavodă
19:00 EEST				Stadium: Ideal; Referee: Ene Mihai Laurențiu

17 August 2023	Vedița Colonești (3)	1–2	Argeș Pitești (2)	Colonești
17:30 EEST				Stadium: Mircea Stan; Referee: Amorăriței Mihai

17 August 2023	Râmnicu Vâlcea (3)	0–5	CS Mioveni (2)	Râmnicu Vâlcea
17:30 EEST				Stadium: Municipal; Referee: Diaconu Constantin Adrian

=== Play-off round ===
- Pot 1 contains 4 teams that finished 9–12 in the play-out stage of the 2022–23 Liga I season, 2 teams that won the Promotion/relegation play-offs and 2 teams that won direct promotion (places 1 and 3 as Steaua București were ineligible) at the end of the 2022–23 Liga II season.
- Pot 2 contains the teams that won the Third qualifying round.

Pot 1

- FC Voluntari
- Universitatea Cluj
- FC Botoșani
- FC Hermannstadt
- Oțelul Galați
- Politehnica Iași
- UTA Arad
- Dinamo București

Pot 2

- Argeș Pitești
- Chindia Târgoviște
- CS Mioveni
- Steaua București
- Gloria Buzău
- Unirea Dej
- Concordia Chiajna
- FK Miercurea Ciuc
- CSC 1599 Șelimbăr
- Unirea Slobozia
- CSC Dumbrăvița
- Metaloglobus București
- Ceahlăul Piatra Neamț
- CS Tunari
- CSM Alexandria
- Corvinul Hunedoara
- FC Bacău
- Viitorul Ianca
- CSM Deva
- Viitorul Șimian
- Progresul Pecica
- Phoenix Buziaș
- Bihor Oradea
- SCM Zalău

The draw for the play-off round took place on the 23rd of August.

29 August 2023	FC Bacău (3)	1–3	Oțelul Galați (1)	Ruși-Ciutea
17:30 EEST	Dudu Drugă 67' (pen.)		Cisotti 57' (pen.); Adăscăliței 59'; Ariel López 74' (pen.)	Stadium: Baza Sportivă FC Bacău; Referee: Cristian Moldoveanu

29 August 2023	CSC Șelimbăr (2)	1–2	FC Voluntari (1)	Cisnădie
17:30 EEST	Paul-Henri Mouasso 49'		Andrei 61'; Dumiter 90+1'	Stadium: Măgura; Referee: Sorin Vădana

29 August 2023	Phoenix Buziaș (3)	0–3	Chindia Târgoviște (2)	Lugoj
17:30 EEST			Golofca 15'; Bogaciuc 20'; Șerban 88'	Stadium: Tineretului; Referee: Adelin Pavel

29 August 2023	CSM Deva (3)	0–2	Gloria Buzău (2)	Deva
17:30 EEST			Dumitrache 15'; Tănasă 61'	Stadium: Cetate; Referee: Dragoș Nicolae Lunca

29 August 2023	Metaloglobus București (2)	1–2	Dinamo București (1)	Târgoviște
19:00 EEST	Yassine Zakir 51'		Bani 78', 90+4'	Stadium: Eugen Popescu; Referee: George Cătălin Roman

30 August 2023	Bihor Oradea (3)	1–0	Argeș Pitești (2)	Oradea
17:00 EEST	Daniel Stan 52'			Stadium: Iuliu Bodola; Referee: Mihai Motan

30 August 2023	CSM Alexandria (2)	1–0	Concordia Chiajna (2)	Turnu Măgurele
17:30 EEST	Mihai Nițescu 49'			Stadium: Municipal; Referee: Claudiu Marcu

30 August 2023	Unirea Dej (2)	0–1	Steaua București (2)	Dej
17:30 EEST			Chipirliu 83' (pen.)	Stadium: Unirea; Referee: Cătălin Buși

30 August 2023	CS Mioveni (2)	0–2	FC Botoșani (1)	Mioveni
17:30 EEST			Drolé 84'; Cioiu 89'	Stadium: Orășenesc; Referee: Ovidiu Robu

30 August 2023	Progresul Pecica (3)	4–1	Viitorul Șimian (3)	Pecica
17:30 EEST	Sergiu Aldan 34'; Luca Bodri 49'; Dan Răchită 51'; Luca Bodri 72'		Fabio Trip 63'	Stadium: Progresul; Referee: Mircea Salomir

30 August 2023	Viitorul Ianca (3)	0–5	CS Tunari (2)	Plopu, Ianca
17:30 EEST			Alexandru Gheorghe 20'; Lambru 26'; Dan Popa 34' (o.g.); Paul Mitrică 64'; Denis Despa 76'	Stadium: Stadionul Plopu; Referee: Mihail Sebastian Lăstun

30 August 2023	Corvinul Hunedoara (2)	4–2	FK Csíkszereda (2)	Hunedoara
17:30 EEST	Denis Hrezdac 2'; Coman 7'; Antoniu Manolache 25' (pen.); Marius Lupu 50'		Jelena 47'; Soufiane Jebari 90+3'	Stadium: Michael Klein; Referee: Florin Ovidiu Mazilu

31 August 2023	Ceahlăul Piatra Neamț (2)	2–4	Universitatea Cluj (1)	Piatra Neamț
17:00 EEST	Petkov 60'; Petre 84'		Tescan 48'; Nistor 79' (pen.); Stoica 81', 88'	Stadium: Stadionul Ceahlăul; Referee: Vlad Baban

31 August 2023	SCM Zalău (3)	3–0	Politehnica Iași (1)	Zalău
17:30 EEST	Vlad Fărcășan 34'; Cosmin Meșter 64'; Sergiu Pop 76'			Stadium: Municipal; Referee: Dan Ștefan Buzărnescu

31 August 2023	Unirea Slobozia (2)	2–5 (a.e.t.)	FC Hermannstadt (1)	Slobozia
17:30 EEST	Bîrnoi 7'; Florinel Ibrian 89'		Rúben Fonseca 45', 104'; Găman 61'; Balaure 112'; Alhassan 117'	Stadium: 1 Mai; Referee: Robert Avram

31 August 2023	CSC Dumbrăvița (2)	0–1	UTA Arad (1)	Arad (Note: Dumbrăvița's pitch is being replaced and as the match was moved for TV, they have agreed to play the match at the Francisc von Neuman stadium)
17:30 EEST			Fábry 88'	Stadium: Francisc von Neuman; Referee: Valentin Porumbel

== Group stage ==
The 6 teams from the play-off stage of the 2022–23 Liga I season and the 2 teams that finished 7–8 in the play-out stage of the 2022–23 Liga I season will be joined in the group stage by the 16 teams that will win the Play-Off round.

The 24 teams will be divided into 3 pots, which will form 4 groups of 6 teams each, with 2 teams from each pot added into every group. Each team will play 3 matches, once against a team from each of the 3 pots.

The teams that finish 1st and 2nd in each group advance to the Quarter-Finals.

The qualified teams were divided into 3 pots.

Pot 1	Pot 2	Pot 3
CFR Cluj (1); Farul Constanța (1); FC U Craiova 1948 (1); FCSB (1); Petrolul Ploiești (1); Rapid București (1); Sepsi OSK (1); Universitatea Craiova (1)	Chindia Târgoviște (2); Dinamo București (1); FC Botoșani (1); FC Hermannstadt (1); FC Voluntari (1); Oțelul Galați (1); Universitatea Cluj (1); UTA Arad (1)	Bihor Oradea (3); Corvinul Hunedoara (2); CS Tunari (2); CSM Alexandria (2); Gloria Buzău (2); Progresul Pecica (3); Steaua București (2); SCM Zalău (3)

Times are EET or EEST (Note: EEST (UTC+3) for dates up to 25 October 2023 (matchday 1), and EET (UTC+2) for dates thereafter (matchdays 2–3).).

=== Group A ===
Pos	Team	Pld	W	D	L	GF	GA	GD	Pts	Qualification	COR	HER	PET	SEP	CHI	PRO
1	Corvinul Hunedoara (Q)	3	3	0	0	9	0	+9	9	Advance to knockout phase	—	—	—	1–0	2–0	—
2	FC Hermannstadt (Q)	3	2	1	0	8	1	+7	7	Advance to knockout phase	—	—	—	1–1	—	—
3	Petrolul Ploiești (E)	3	2	1	0	6	3	+3	7		—	—	—	2–2	—	—
4	Sepsi OSK (E)	3	0	2	1	3	4	−1	2		—	—	—	—	—	—
5	Chindia Târgoviște (E)	3	0	0	3	0	5	−5	0		—	0–1	0–2	—	—	—
6	Progresul Pecica (E)	3	0	0	3	1	14	−13	0		0–6	0–6	1–2	—	—	—

Source: FRF
(E) Eliminated; (Q) Qualified for the phase indicated
27 September 2023
14:00

Progresul Pecica	1–2	Petrolul Ploiești
Ewald Wild (red card) 17'; Abdullahi Nasiru 43'		Roman 19', 54'

Progresul, Pecica
Referee: Dan Buzarnescu
27 September 2023
17:00

Corvinul Hunedoara	2–0	Chindia Târgoviște
Coman 4'; Neacșa 59' (pen.)		Popescu (yellow card) 58' (yellow-red card) 59'

Michael Klein, Hunedoara
Referee: Mircea Ardelean
27 September 2023
18:30

Hermannstadt	1–1	Sepsi OSK
Bejan 65'		Matei 52' (pen.); Rența (yellow card) 67' (yellow-red card) 90+7'

Municipal, Sibiu
Referee: Cătălin Buşi

31 October 2023
15:00

Corvinul Hunedoara	1–0	Sepsi OSK
Antoniu Manolache 57'

Michael Klein, Hunedoara
Referee: Robert Avram
31 October 2023
18:00

Chindia Târgoviște	0–2	Petrolul Ploiești
		Abuashvili 20'; Huja 88'

Eugen Popescu, Târgoviște
Referee: George Cătălin Găman
1 November 2023
14:00

Progresul Pecica	0–6	Hermannstadt
		Rúben Fonseca 23', 45+1'; Biceanu 32'; Neguț 52' (pen.); Oroian 69'; G. Iancu 76'

Progresul, Pecica
Referee: Cristian Moldoveanu

7 December 2023
17:00

Petrolul Ploiești	2–2	Sepsi OSK
Musi 24'; Marian Huja 63'		Ciobotariu 45'; Gheorghe 48'

Ilie Oană, Ploiești
Referee: Claudiu Marcu
7 December 2023
17:00

Chindia Târgoviște	0–1	Hermannstadt
		Bărbuț 90+6'

Eugen Popescu, Târgoviște
Referee: Bogdan Dumitrache
7 December 2023
17:00

Progresul Pecica	0–6	Corvinul Hunedoara
		Coman 9'; Marius Lupu 30', 36', 48'; Antonio Bradu 54' (pen.), 90+3'

Iuliu Bodola (Note: Played at the Iuliu Bodola stadium as Progresul's stadium does not have floodlights), Oradea
Referee: Mircea Salomir

=== Group B ===
Pos	Team	Pld	W	D	L	GF	GA	GD	Pts	Qualification	UCJ	CFR	RAP	STE	ALE	BOT
1	Universitatea Cluj (Q)	3	2	1	0	8	2	+6	7	Advance to knockout phase	—	1–1	—	—	—	—
2	CFR Cluj (Q)	3	1	2	0	4	2	+2	5	Advance to knockout phase	—	—	—	—	—	—
3	Rapid București (E)	3	1	2	0	3	1	+2	5		—	0–0	—	—	—	—
4	CSA Steaua București (E)	3	1	1	1	4	5	−1	4		1–3	—	0–0	—	—	—
5	CSM Alexandria (E)	3	1	0	2	5	7	−2	3		—	1–3	—	2–3	—	2–1
6	FC Botoșani (E)	3	0	0	3	2	9	−7	0		0–4	—	1–3	—	—	—

Source: FRF
(E) Eliminated; (Q) Qualified for the phase indicated
28 September 2023
16:15

CSA Steaua București	1–3	Universitatea Cluj
Boiciuc 65'		Chipciu 26'; Ilie 34', 53'

Steaua, Bucharest
Referee: Baban Vlad
28 September 2023
18:30

CSM Alexandria	1–3	CFR Cluj
Stancu 35' (pen.)		Fică 3'; Muhar 42'; Camora 46'

Municipal, Turnu Măgurele
Referee: Robu Ovidiu
28 September 2023
21:00

FC Botoșani	1–3	Rapid București
Casap 81'		Cristea 17'; Iacob 21'; Pănoiu 53'

Municipal, Botoșani
Referee: Dumitrache Bogdan

1 November 2023
21:00

CSA Steaua București	0–0	Rapid București

Steaua, Bucharest
Referee: Cătălin Buşi
2 November 2023
14:00

CSM Alexandria	2–1	FC Botoșani
Gîdea 49'; Eduard Sirbu 90+3'		Șeroni 21'

Municipal, Turnu Măgurele
Referee: Marcu Claudiu
2 November 2023
20:30

Universitatea Cluj	1–1	CFR Cluj
Krešić 41' (o.g.)		Bîrligea 66'

Cluj Arena, Cluj-Napoca
Referee: Hațegan

6 December 2023
19:00

Rapid București	0–0	CFR Cluj

Rapid-Giulești, Bucharest
Referee: Marian Barbu
6 December 2023
19:00

FC Botoșani	0–4	Universitatea Cluj
		Stoica 5', 61'; Manu 35' (pen.); Fossati 77'

Municipal, Botoșani
Referee: Robert Avram
6 December 2023
19:00

CSM Alexandria	2–3	CSA Steaua București
Petre Simon 88', 90+2'		David Maftei 47'; Chunchukov 59', 86'

Municipal, Turnu Măgurele
Referee: Sorin Vădana

=== Group C ===
Pos	Team	Pld	W	D	L	GF	GA	GD	Pts	Qualification	FCU	OTE	FCS	DIN	ZAL	BIH
1	FC U Craiova 1948 (Q)	3	2	1	0	4	1	+3	7	Advance to knockout phase	—	—	2–0	—	—	—
2	Oțelul Galați (Q)	3	1	2	0	8	5	+3	5	Advance to knockout phase	—	—	1–1	—	—	—
3	FCSB (E)	3	1	1	1	3	3	0	4		—	—	—	—	—	—
4	Dinamo București (E)	3	0	3	0	5	5	0	3		1–1	3–3	—	—	—	—
5	SCM Zalău (E)	3	1	0	2	3	6	−3	3		0–1	1–4	—	—	—	2–1
6	Bihor Oradea (E)	3	0	1	2	2	5	−3	1		—	—	0–2	1–1	—	—

Source: FRF
(E) Eliminated; (Q) Qualified for the phase indicated
26 September 2023
16:15

SCM Zalău	1–4	Oțelul Galați
Alexandru Cherecheș 45+4'; Sergiu Pop (yellow card) 35' (yellow-red card) 47'		Cârjan 14', 36'; Cissé 21'; Latouchent 75'

Municipal, Zalău
Attendance: 2,000
Referee: Sorin Vădana
26 September 2023
21:00

Dinamo București	1–1	FC U Craiova 1948
Amzăr 18'		Bahassa 66' (pen.)

Arena Națională, Bucharest
Attendance: 4,000
Referee: Horațiu Feşnic
27 September 2023
21:00

Bihor Oradea	0–2	FCSB
		Miculescu 26'; Ngezana 69'

Iuliu Bodola, Oradea
Referee: Andrei Moroiță

31 October 2023
21:00

Oțelul Galați	1–1	FCSB
Ariel López 90+1'		Băluță 76'

Oțelul, Galați
Referee: Viorel Flueran
1 November 2023
13:00

SCM Zalău	0–1	FC U Craiova 1948
		Padula 23'

Municipal, Zalău
Referee: George Roman
3 November 2023
20:30

Bihor Oradea	1–1	Dinamo București
Alexandru Popa 83'		Grigore 48'

Iuliu Bodola, Oradea
Referee: Ionela Peşu

6 December 2023
14:00

SCM Zalău	2–1	Bihor Oradea
Cosmin Meșter 28'; Nikolić 79'		Florin Chitaș 89'

Municipal, Zalău
Referee: Valentin Porumbel
7 December 2023
20:45

Dinamo București	3–3	Oțelul Galați
Bena 22'; Amzăr 65'; Gonçalo Gregório 84'		Samuel Teles 25'; Bena 53' (o.g.); Cissé 57', (red card) 90'

Arcul de Triumf, Bucharest
Referee: George Cătălin Găman
7 December 2023
20:45

FC U Craiova 1948	2–0	FCSB
Bauza 49'; Van Durmen 44'

Ion Oblemenco, Craiova
Referee: Ovidiu Hațegan

=== Group D ===
Pos	Team	Pld	W	D	L	GF	GA	GD	Pts	Qualification	UCV	VOL	BUZ	UTA	TUN	FAR
1	Universitatea Craiova (Q)	3	2	1	0	6	1	+5	7	Advance to knockout phase	—	—	—	—	—	4–0
2	FC Voluntari (Q)	3	1	2	0	3	1	+2	5	Advance to knockout phase	—	—	—	—	—	2–0
3	Gloria Buzău (E)	3	1	1	1	3	3	0	4		—	—	—	1–2	—	1–0
4	UTA Arad (E)	3	1	1	1	2	2	0	4		0–1	0–0	—	—	—	—
5	CS Tunari (E)	3	0	3	0	3	3	0	3		1–1	1–1	1–1	—	—	—
6	Farul Constanța (E)	3	0	0	3	0	7	−7	0		—	—	—	—	—	—

Source: FRF
(E) Eliminated; (Q) Qualified for the phase indicated
26 September 2023
18:30

FC Voluntari	2–0	Farul Constanța
Florea 8'; Cocian 85'

Anghel Iordănescu, Voluntari
Referee: Marcel Bîrsan
27 September 2023
16:00

Gloria Buzău	1–2	UTA Arad
Dumitrache 32'		Marcelo Freitas 57'; Vucenovic 75'

Municipal, Buzău
Referee: Cristian Moldoveanu
27 September 2023
16:15

CS Tunari	1–1	Universitatea Craiova
Paul Mitrică 46'		Marković 90'

Comunal, Tunari
Referee: George Cătălin Roman

1 November 2023
15:00

CS Tunari	1–1	FC Voluntari
Luca Mitrica 84'		Matricardi 64'

Comunal, Tunari
Referee: Lucian Rusandu
1 November 2023
18:00

UTA Arad	0–1	Universitatea Craiova
		Mateiu 80'

Iuliu Bodola (Note: UTA's pitch is being replaced and they are playing their home games at the Iuliu Bodola stadium), Oradea
Referee: Sorin Vădana
2 November 2023
17:30

Gloria Buzău	1–0	Farul Constanța
Dumitrache 86'

Municipal, Buzău
Referee: Iulian Călin

5 December 2023
19:00

Universitatea Craiova	4–0	Farul Constanța
Koljić 45+2'; Baiaram 52'; Kurtić 54'; Trică 86'

Ion Oblemenco, Craiova
Referee: Cătălin Buși
5 December 2023
19:00

UTA Arad	0–0	FC Voluntari

Iuliu Bodola, Oradea
Referee: István Kovács
5 December 2023
19:00

CS Tunari	1–1	Gloria Buzău
Florică 5'		Ionuț Nadolu 56'

Comunal, Tunari
Referee: Vlad Băban

== Third Stage ==
=== Bracket ===
Quarter-finals
Corvinul Hunedoara	4
CFR Cluj	0
FCU Craiova	0 (2)
FC Voluntari (p)	0 (4)
Universitatea Craiova	0
Oțelul Galați (a.e.t.)	1
Universitatea Cluj	1
Hermannstadt	0

Semi-finals
Corvinul Hunedoara	3
FC Voluntari	1
Oțelul Galați	2
Universitatea Cluj	1

Final
Corvinul Hunedoara (p)	2 (3)
Oțelul Galați	2 (2)

=== Quarter-finals ===
2 April 2024	Corvinul Hunedoara	4–0	CFR Cluj	Hunedoara
19:30 EEST	Lică 43'; Coman 51'; Pîrvulescu 67'; I. Pop 90+2'	frfotbal		Stadium: Michael Klein; Referee: Iulian Dima

3 April 2024	FCU Craiova	0–0 (a.e.t.) (2-4 p)	FC Voluntari	Craiova
18:00 EEST		frfotbal		Stadium: Ion Oblemenco; Referee: Florin Andrei
	Penalties
	Radu Negru (penalty scored); Pop (penalty missed); Compagnucci (penalty scored); Padula (penalty missed)		(penalty scored) Florea; (penalty missed) Voican; (penalty scored) Ciobanu; (penalty scored) Robert Popescu; (penalty scored) Bautista Cascini

3 April 2024	Universitatea Cluj	1–0	Hermannstadt	Cluj-Napoca
21:00 EEST	Anselmo 90+3'	frfotbal		Stadium: Cluj Arena; Referee: Andrei Chivulete

4 April 2024	Universitatea Craiova	0–1 (a.e.t.)	Oțelul Galați	Craiova
19:30 EEST		frfotbal	João Lameira 114'	Stadium: Ion Oblemenco; Referee: Horațiu Feșnic

=== Semi-finals ===
17 April 2024	Corvinul Hunedoara	3–1	FC Voluntari	Hunedoara
19:00 EEST	Manolache 20'; Neacșa 61'; Coman 72'		Florea 33'	Stadium: Michael Klein

18 April 2024	Oțelul Galați	2–1	Universitatea Cluj	Galați
20:30 EEST	Cissé 12'; Chipciu 90' (o.g.)		Nistor 45+1' (pen.)	Stadium: Oțelul; Attendance: 8,733; Referee: Radu Petrescu

== Final ==
15 May 2024	Corvinul Hunedoara	2–2 (a.e.t.) (3–2 p)	Oțelul Galați	Sibiu
20:30 EEST (UTC+03)	Coman 39'; Manolache 74'		Rušević 27', 58' (pen.)	Stadium: Municipal; Attendance: 11,703; Referee: Marcel Bîrsan
	Penalties
	Coman (penalty missed); Manolache (penalty scored); Bradu (penalty scored); Pîrvulescu (penalty missed); Hergheligiu (penalty scored)		(penalty scored) Cisotti; (penalty missed) Gaitán; (penalty missed) Lameira; (penalty missed) Ghiocel; (penalty scored) Miguel Silva
