= SCM Zalău =

Romanian football club

- Full name: Sport Club Municipal Zalău
- Nicknames: Zălăuanii (The People from Zalău); Gruparea de sub Meseș (The Team Below the Meseș Hill)
- Short name: SCM
- Founded: 27 June 2019; 7 years ago
- Ground: Municipal
- Capacity: 3,500
- Owner: Zalău Municipality
- General manager: Marius Pașca
- Manager: Ștefan Odoroabă
- League: Liga III
- 2025–26: Liga III, Seria IV, 4th
- Website: http://scmzalau.ro/
Home colours	Away colours

Sport Club Municipal Zalău, commonly known as SCM Zalău, is a Romanian professional football club based in Zalău, Sălaj County. This team represents the football section of the multi-sport club SCM Zalău, which also include athletics, boxing, tennis, table tennis, Greco-Roman wrestling and handball (youth).

SCM Zalău was established on 27 June 2019 and is fully supported by the Municipality of Zalău. The football section of SCM was enrolled directly in the Liga III, on the place of newly promoted Unirea Mirșid, club that gave up its place and right to play in the third tier. The new team continues the legacy of Zalău football, legacy started by Armătura Zalău and continued by FC Zalău, however, having no official connection (legal or ideological) with any of them.

== History ==
=== Armătura and FC Zalău (1949–2017) ===
FC Armătura Zalău was founded in 1946 as CS Zalău and since 1975 was owned by Armătura Zalău, main factory of the city, with the field of activity "Iron and Steel Industrial Fittings". Armătura was the most representative football team of Zalău and Sălaj County, playing at the national level and at its best, in the second tier (Liga II). Over time, notable players such as Mircea Bolba, Alin Chibulcutean, Claudiu Cornaci, Vasile Dobrău, Adrian Gongolea, Vasile Jula, Florin Sabou or Gabriel Vașvari wore the red and black kits of Armătura and managers such as Leontin Grozavu or Iosif Vigu, among others, led "the Steelworkes" from the technical bench. After 1990 the factory's activity started to decline and since 2000, Liviu Olar Pop, a local businessman was the main sponsor of the football team. In 2005, Pop decided to withdraw its support and Armătura was dissolved.

FC Zalău was founded in the spring of 2006, in order to continue Zalău's football legacy. The founder and owner of the new team was Ioan Morar, a local businessman, as well as a former business partner of Liviu Olar Pop. The club was enrolled in the Liga IV (4th tier) and after two defeats in the promotion play-offs (0–1 in 2006, against U Cluj 1919 and 2–3 in 2007, against Bihor II Oradea) FC Zalău was finally promoted at the end of the 2007–08 season. Zălăuanii won their third promotion play-off, 1–0, against Spicul Mocira, then played for 9 years at the level of Liga III and even had intentions to promote in the second tier, at some time, but was finally dissolved in the summer of 2017, due to financial problems.

=== SCM Zalău, a new beginning (2019–present) ===
SCM Zalău was established on 27 June 2019 and was enrolled directly in the Liga III, on the place of newly promoted Unirea Mirșid, club that gave up its place and right to play in the third tier. The new team continues the legacy of Zalău football, legacy started by Armătura Zalău and continued by FC Zalău, however, having no official connection (legal or ideological) with any of them.

== Ground ==
SCM Zalău, like its predecessor, Armătura and FC Zalău, plays its home matches on Municipal Stadium in Zalău, with a capacity of 3,500 seats. The stadium was also temporary the home ground of other football teams and is also used as a multi-purpose stadium.

== Honours ==
- Liga III
  - Winners (1): 2023–24
  - Runners-up (1): 2020–21

== Players ==
=== First-team squad ===
As of 10 September 2024

Note: Flags indicate national team as defined under FIFA eligibility rules; some limited exceptions apply. Players may hold more than one non-FIFA nationality.

No.	Pos.	Nation	Player
1	GK	ROU	Alberto Cimpoeșu
2	DF	ROU	Alexandru Fărăgău
4	DF	ROU	Ionuț Sălăjan
5	DF	SRB	Dejan Uzelac
7	MF	ROU	Marius Codreanu
8	MF	ROU	Alexandru Dohan
9	FW	MNE	Stefan Nikolić (Captain)
10	MF	ROU	Răzvan Mogoș
11	FW	ROU	Alexandru Zaharia
12	GK	ROU	David Poptean
13	DF	ROU	Florinel Pop
15	DF	ROU	Marius Leitan
16	MF	ROU	Cosmin Meșter
17	DF	ROU	Alexandru Cherecheș

No.	Pos.	Nation	Player
18	MF	ROU	Alexandru Negrean
20	FW	ROU	Luca Nagy
21	FW	ROU	Gabriel Fulga
22	MF	ROU	Dávid Csoknádi
23	MF	ROU	Samuel Zimța
25	DF	MNE	Miloš Bakrač
27	DF	ROU	Vlad Fărcășan
29	MF	ROU	Florian Varga
55	DF	MDA	Mihail Țipac
80	MF	ROU	Răzvan Matiș
92	MF	ROU	Adrian Niță
98	FW	ROU	Alexandru Jula
—	FW	FRA	Rémi Emeriau

=== Out on loan ===
Note: Flags indicate national team as defined under FIFA eligibility rules; some limited exceptions apply. Players may hold more than one non-FIFA nationality.

No. / Pos. / Nation / Player	No. / Pos. / Nation / Player

== Club Officials ==
=== Board of directors ===
Role	Name
Owner	(Romania) Zalău Municipality
President	(Romania) Marcel Țîrle
General Manager	(Romania) Marius Pașca
Sporting Director	(Romania) Ioan Gurzău
Head of Youth Development	(Romania) Alexandru Pop
Technical director	(Romania) Alin Pop

=== Current technical staff ===
Role	Name
Manager	(Romania) Ștefan Odoroabă
Assistant manager	(Romania) Claudiu Cornaci
Goalkeeping coach	(Romania) Daniel Harnagea
Fitness coach	(Romania) Sergiu Moga
Masseur	(Romania) Marius Blaj

== League history ==
Season	Tier	Division	Place	Cupa României
2025–26	3	Liga III (Seria VIII)	TBD	
2024–25	3	Liga III (Seria X)	3rd	
2023–24	3	Liga III (Seria X)	1st (C)	Group Stage
2022–23	3	Liga III (Seria X)	5th	
2021–22	3	Liga III (Seria X)	5th	
2020–21	3	Liga III (Seria X)	2nd	
2019–20	3	Liga III (Seria V)	16th	1st round

== Former managers ==
- (Romania) Dorin Toma (2021–2022)
