= Trust Stadium =

Stadium in Romania

- Interactive map of Trust Stadium
- Address: Str. Energiei 15
- Location: Cernavodă, Romania
- Coordinates: 44°19′54.4″N 28°02′25.6″E
- Owner: Town of Cernavodă
- Operator: Axiopolis Cernavodă
- Capacity: 5,000 (100 seated)
- Surface: Grass

Construction
- Opened: 1930

Tenant
- Axiopolis Cernavodă (1930–present)

The Trust Stadium is a multi-purpose stadium in Cernavodă, Romania. It is currently used mostly for football matches, is the home ground of Axiopolis Cernavodă and has a capacity of 5,000 people with 100 seats. The first football match played here was in 1930, a match between local team, Mercur Cernavodă, and a team from Medgidia. The match ended with the victory of Mercur, 6–0.
