= ACS Progresul Pecica =

Romanian football club

Progresul Pecica
- Full name: Asociația Club Sportiv; Progresul Pecica
- Nicknames: Pecicanii (The People from Pecica); Galben-Albaștrii (The Yellow and Blues); Petroliștii (The Oilmen)
- Short name: Pecica
- Founded: 1949; 77 years ago as Steaua Roșie Pecica; 1992; 34 years ago as West Petrom Pecica; 2001; 25 years ago as Progresul Pecica
- Ground: Progresul
- Capacity: 1,500
- Owner: Pecica Town
- Chairman: Dorel Găvruță
- Manager: Dan Stupar
- League: Liga III
- 2025–26: Liga III, Seria VII, 7th
- Website: https://progresulpecica.com
Home colours	Away colours

Asociația Club Sportiv Progresul Pecica, commonly known as ACS Progresul Pecica, Progresul Pecica, or simply as Pecica is a Romanian professional football club based in Pecica, Arad County.

Progresul Pecica was founded in 1949, under the name of Steaua Roșie Pecica, as a result of the merger between Virtutea Pecica (est. in 1921) and Club Atletic Rovine (est. in 1924). Steaua Roșie was renamed in 1954 as Recolta Pecica and since 1965 was known as Progresul Pecica playing only at the level of the County or Districtual League (4th tier).

Progresul was renamed again in 1987, this time as Aurul Negru Pecica and started to be financially supported by the Pecica Oil Scaffold. In 1992, former Divizia C member Petrolul Arad/ Zădăreni (est. 1983) merged with Aurul Negru Pecica (est. 1949) and formed a new entity, West Petrom Arad (Pecica). West Petrom was financially supported by Petrom and for 10 years (1994–2004) played in the third tier, but with oscillating results.

In 2001, Aurul Negru Pecica withdrew from the West Petrom Association, changed its name back to Progresul Pecica and enrolled a senior squad in the Divizia D – Arad County. Progresul relegated in the Honor Division after only one season, while West Petrom spent three more seasons in the third tier before it was dissolved. Progresul promoted back in the Liga IV after 2005 and won twice the competition, in 2015 and 2019, but it succeeded to promote in the third tier only in 2019.

== History ==
=== Virtutea and AC Rovine, the pioneers (1921–1950) ===
Period	Name
1949–1954	Steaua Roșie Pecica
1954–1960	Recolta Pecica
1960–1987	Progresul Pecica
1987–1992	Aurul Negru Pecica
1992–2001	West Petrom Pecica
2001–present	Progresul Pecica

AS Virtutea Pecica was established on 15 August 1921 and was the first football club of Pecica, just a commune at that time. Virtutea was founded as a sporting and cultural club, in its composition entering three sports sections (football, tennis & table tennis, chess), but also a cultural section (literature), frequented by all the athletes of the club. The management of AS Virtutea was composed of: Prof. Nestor Blaga, Ioan Gh. Pălincaș, priest Teodor Șiclovan (honorary presidents), Dr. Tyurovschi (president), Augustin Bochiș (secretary) A.M. Iobb (cashier) and Dr. Olteanu (sporting director). Board members were: R. Ponta, Florea Locușteanu, Roman Jugu, E. Ponta and Aron Șiclovan. It is worth mentioning that A.S. Virtutea Pecica had legal personality.

Among the sports sections that had results at the level of Arad County, was also the football team, which was in the first part of the standings. During the 1946–47 season, the football section of AS Virtutea activated in the third tier, Divizia C. One of the notable results obtained in this period was a 1–1 draw, in a match played against the former champion of Romania, Ripensia Timișoara. These results were obtained with the following players: Alexandru Toth, Ioan Rotariu, Roman Teretean, Ștefan Ponta, Licu Igrișan, Alexandru Molnar, Gheorghe Ponta, Ilie Solomie, Mircea Popețiu, Rudolf Rutz, Iuliu Stainer, Liviu Barbu, Roman Rusu, Cornel Curea, Nicolae Grozav and Gheorge Haș. In the 1948–49 season of the districtual football championship (4th tier), Virtutea was ranked 3rd at the end of the first part of the season. In this edition, the championship included the following members: Vagonul Arad, Patria Chișineu-Criș, Unirea Arad, Olimpia Arad, Șoimii Pâncota, Tricolorul Arad, Unirea Sântana, Frontiera Curtici, Sebișana Sebiș, Club Atletic Rovine (Pecica), S.G. Arad, Găiana Arad and Șoimii Lipova. In addition to the domestic championship, friendly international matches were played against B.T.K. Battonya and Makó, both clubs from Hungary.

During this period, another club was active around the commune of Pecica, Club Atletic Rovine or Rovine Atletikai Club. Club Atletic was established in 1924 and was the multi-sport club of the neighboring commune, Rovine, also the football club of the Hungarian community. The club had only two sections (football, tennis & table tennis) and played only in the districtual championship (4th tier). In first part of the 1948–49 season AC Rovine was ranked 11th of 14, with the following ranking line: 13 (matches) 4 (wins) 1 (draw) 8 (losses) 23 (goals scored) 34 (goals conceded) and 9 (points). The club management included the following members: Pál Zvér, Miklós Gergely, Pál Kabát, Mihály Fais and Mihály Lelik, among others. From the long list of players who played for Club Atletic Rovine, these were the most notable: János Kovács (Kudel), József Jován, Mihály Magyar, József Szanda, András Hegedűs, József Szomorú, Dezső and Mihály Nagy-György.

In 1949, the two sports societies based in Pecica (Virtutea) and Rovine (Club Atletic) merged and formed a new entity, named Steaua Roșie Pecica (Red Star Pecica).

=== Progresul cannot exceed its condition (1950–1992) ===
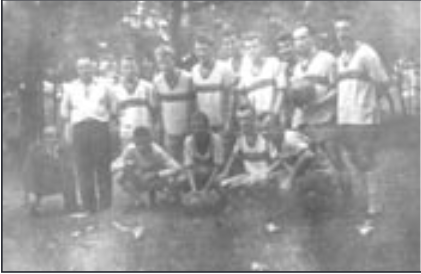
Progresul Pecica squad in the 1960–61 season.

Steaua Roșie Pecica played in four seasons at the level of the 4th tier and was one of the most important clubs from the Arad District. In 1954, Steaua Roșie was renamed as Recolta Pecica and continued to play under this name, but at the same level.

In 1960, commune of Pecica and commune of Rovine merged, then forming commune of Pecica, one of the biggest communes in the country, at that time, then starting with 1965, a new administrative-territorial division has been implemented in Romania and a new district was founded, Pecica district. Recolta was renamed as Progresul Pecica in 1960 and activated for next years in the Banat regional championship (4th tier), with remarkable results.

Even though Progresul Pecica was recognized as an uncomfortable team, it was unable to overcome its condition in the following years, continuing to evolve only in the 4th division. However, in 1968 the youth academy of Progresul was opened and in only three years of activity, under the lead of some former important footballers, such as Sándor Schwartz, Ștefan Dobra or Dușan Gavrilovici, but also with the collaboration of some local coaches, such as Romul Popețiu, Matei Kocsik or Silviu Frățilă, Progresul's Academy managed to propose some interesting players for the upper levels. The academy was dissolved in 1971 following political pressures, in that period the plan was that the county must have only a good football team and only one important academy, thus all forces had to be concentrated towards UTA Arad, the most successful club of the county.

Supported financially and politically only at the level of the commune, Progresul continued to play for the next 21 years in the Arad County League (4th division), with no notable results. In 1987, Progresul Pecica was renamed again, this time as Aurul Negru Pecica (Black Gold Pecica) and from that moment, the team started to be financially supported by the Pecica Oil Scaffold. But the new investments did not bring the much-anticipated promotion and Aurul Negru remained at amateur level.

On the other hand, in the neighboring commune of Zădăreni, a football team founded in 1983 under the name of Petrolul Arad succeeded a fast ascension, promoting to Divizia C at the end of the 1987–88 season, with, much later well known, Ionuț Popa as a player and manager. Petrolul managed to avoid relegation for three consecutive seasons achieving the following rankings: 6th of 16 (1988–89), 8th of 16 (1988–89) and 14th of 16 (1990–91).

During the 1991–92 season, Petrolul withdrew from Divizia C due to certain financial problems and misunderstandings at local level.

=== New times, oil changes the situation (1992–2004) ===
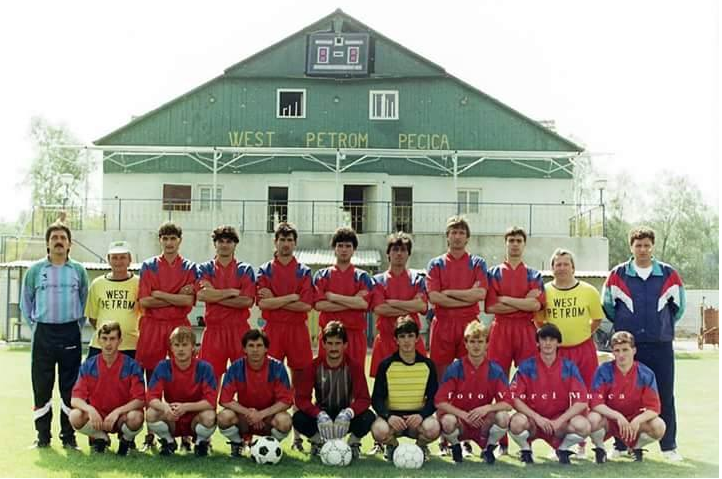
West Petrom squad in the 1993–94 season.

In the summer of 1992, the two teams, more or less financially supported by Petrom, Petrolul Arad (Zădăreni) and Aurul Negru Pecica merged and formed a new entity, West Petrom Arad, also known as West Petrom Pecica. The new formed entity was mainly the successor of Aurul Negru Pecica. This conclusion is resulting from certain organizational details, such as the club's colors (yellow and blue), home ground (Progresul Stadium, renamed as Petrom Stadium and located in Pecica), the logo of the new entity (mainly yellow and blue, with an oil scaffold, the name "West Petrom Pecica" and 1924 as the year of foundation, which was the year of the establishment of Club Atletic Rovine, one of the Aurul Negru's parent clubs) and also enrolling in the Divizia D on the place of Aurul Negru.

In the first season, 1992–93, "the Oilmen" were overtaken by CPL Arad, who then promoted to Divizia C, but in the following season, 1993–94, West Petrom Pecica became the champion of Divizia D – Arad County and played in the promotion play-off. Although it does not won the play-off, West Petrom Pecica reached Divizia C due to the merger between Astra Arad and Aris Arad, merge that had as result the club named FC Arad, "pecicanii" receiving the vacant place. Formally, FC Arad was the legal successor of Astra Arad and West Petrom received the place of Aris (former Strungul), club which was absorbed in the merging process. Apart from the title of county champion, West Petrom Pecica also won the preliminary round (Arad County round) of Cupa României. In the final, disputed on 23 June 1994, in Zăbrani, West Petrom Pecica defeated Mureșul Zădăreni (the new team of Zădăreni, after the leaving of Petrolul to Pecica) with the score of 4–2.

West Petrom Arad (Pecica) played for 10 years at the level of the third tier. This period was by far the best in the history of local football, despite the fact that West Petrom was an unpredictable team, often oscillating in results. At the end of the first season, "the Oilmen" were ranked 14th of 20th, in the following season their results getting better, 9th of 20, but just to be ranked 15th of 19 at the end of the 1996–97 edition. Starting with the 1997–98 season, West Petrom it became an uncomfortable team for the rivals, hard to beat, and their rankings were mainly in the top of the standings. West Petrom finished in the late 1990s on the following positions: 5th (1997–98), 4th (1998–99) and 6th (1999–2000).

The apogee moment of the football from Pecica was on 21 September 1999, when Petrom Stadium hosted the encounter between West Petrom Pecica and the most titled team in Romania, Steaua București. At the match attracted 5–6,000 supporters (the capacity of the stadium was only 2,500) and was part of the 1999–2000 Cupa României, Round of 32. Steaua with a squad managed by Emerich Jenei and formed of players such as: Martin Tudor, Laurențiu Reghecampf, Iulian Miu, Eric Lincar, Eugen Trică, Laurențiu Roșu or Cristian Ciocoiu, among others, won with the score of 1–0. In the West Petrom's squad entered the following players: Țapoș – V. Tofaș, Arman, Bene, Hardălău, Varga, R. Gerge, Balaș, Balaj, Ștefăligă and Toderaș, manager Gian Pio del Monaco.

The beginning of the 2000s also meant the regress of West Petrom, club which was ranked only 10th of 15, at the end of the 2000–01 season. In the summer of 2001, West Petrom Arad moved also its headquarter from Arad to Pecica, but at the end of the season was ranked only 13th of 16. Also this season is an important turning point for the future, as it was known, West Petrom Arad (Pecica) was founded in 1992 by the merger between Petrolul Arad (Zădăreni) and Aurul Negru Pecica, only that in the same summer in which West Petrom was moved legally to Pecica, the local government withdrew Aurul Negru from the business and enrolled the team in the Divizia D – Arad County, under its former name of Progresul Pecica.

In this way it practically came to the original situation, precisely from 1924, when in Pecica were existing two football clubs. If in that period the supremacy was divided between Virtutea Pecica and Club Atletic Rovine, now West Petrom Pecica and Progresul Pecica were the contestants. The situation was in fact not great, Progresul relegated in the 5th tier at the end of the 2001–02 season and West Petrom played for three more seasons in the Divizia C, but with no notable results, Petrom withdrew its sponsorship and the team was dissolved.

=== Progresul is back (2004–present) ===
Progresul Pecica withdrew from the West Petrom Association in the summer of 2001, was re-founded under the name of ACS Progresul Pecica and enrolled in the Divizia D – Arad County. Progresul relegated to Honor Division in 2002, where it remained for several years.

Progresul promoted back to Liga IV after 2005 and was in generally a middle table team. At the end of the 2013–14 season, "pecicanii" were ranked 2nd, right after UTA Arad, then winning the championship in the following season, but missed the promotion, after a 1–6 defeat on aggregate, in the promotion play-off match disputed against Performanța Ighiu. After a few seasons ended on the seats 4–6 places, Progresul won again the County League in 2019, but this time also promoted to Liga III, after winning 3–1 on aggregate against Retezatul Hațeg. 2019–20 Liga III season was the first one at this level for Pecica after 15 years of absence, since West Petrom Pecica withdrew from the league.

== Ground ==
Progresul Pecica plays its home matches on Progresul Stadium, located in Pecica, Arad County, with a capacity of 2,500 people. The stadium was opened in the 1920s and over time it has gone through some modernization and renovation processes, but still retaining its vintage style. The stadium was known in the past as Comunal Stadium or Petrom Stadium and the largest number of spectators recorded was of 5–6,000, on 21 September 1999, at the match between West Petrom Pecica and Steaua București.

== Honours ==
=== Leagues ===
- Liga IV – Arad County
  - Winners (3): 1993–94, 2014–15, 2018–19
  - Runners-up (4): 1982–83, 1987–88, 1992–93, 2013–14
- Liga V – Arad County
  - Winners (1): 2006–07

=== Cups ===
- Cupa României – Arad County
  - Winners (2): 1993–94, 2018–19

=== Other performances ===
- Appearances in Liga III: 7
  - excluding 2001–04 period, after the withdrawal of Progresul from West Petrom Association and 1946–47 season, spent by Virtutea in the third tier
- Best finish in Liga III: 4th (1998–99)
- Best finish in the Romanian Cup: Round of 32 (1999–2000)

==== Virtutea Pecica ====
- Districtual Championship
  - Winners (1): 1946

== Players ==
=== First team squad ===
As of 10 September 2024

Note: Flags indicate national team as defined under FIFA eligibility rules; some limited exceptions apply. Players may hold more than one non-FIFA nationality.

No.	Pos.	Nation	Player
1	GK	ROU	Rafael Zamfir
2	DF	ROU	Ewald Wild (Captain)
3	DF	ROU	Darius Iurasciuc (on loan from UTA)
4	DF	ROU	Adrian Bain
5	MF	ROU	Alexandru Matyus
6	DF	ROU	Claudio Mocanu
7	DF	ROU	Sergiu Aldan
8	MF	ROU	Nicolae Călin
9	FW	UKR	Vadym Kyrychenko (on loan from UTA)
10	MF	ROU	Bogdan Bozian
11	FW	ROU	Samir Borcea
12	GK	ROU	Fabian Burtic

No.	Pos.	Nation	Player
14	DF	ROU	Andrei Haloș
15	MF	ROU	Marius Șimăndan
16	MF	ROU	Gabriel Stanciu
17	DF	ROU	Răzvan Olăroiu (on loan from UTA)
18	DF	ROU	Gabriel Hara (on loan from UTA)
19	MF	ROU	Dan Răchită
20	MF	ROU	Mario Salka (on loan from UTA)
21	DF	ROU	Denis Salka
22	DF	ROU	Adrian Suslak
23	FW	ROU	Mirel Arsene (Vice-Captain)
32	DF	ROU	Gabriel Szep

=== Out on loan ===
Note: Flags indicate national team as defined under FIFA eligibility rules; some limited exceptions apply. Players may hold more than one non-FIFA nationality.

No. / Pos. / Nation / Player	No. / Pos. / Nation / Player

== Club Officials ==
=== Board of directors ===
Role	Name
Owner	(Romania) Pecica Town
President	(Romania) Dorel Găvruță
Sporting Director	(Romania) Cristian Pilan

=== Current technical staff ===
Role	Name
Manager	(Romania) Dan Stupar
Assistant Coaches	(Romania) Bogdan Bozian (Romania) Mirel Arsene
Goalkeeping Coach	(Romania) Mihai Grozav
Masseur	(Romania) Octavian Iancu

== League history ==
Season	Tier	Division	Place	Cupa României
2025–26	3	Liga III (Seria VII)	TBD	
2024–25	3	Liga III (Seria IX)	4th	
2023–24	3	Liga III (Seria VIII)	5th	Group Stage
2022–23	3	Liga III (Seria VIII)	5th	
2021–22	3	Liga III (Seria VIII)	6th	
2020–21	3	Liga III (Seria VIII)	4th	
2019–20	3	Liga III (Seria IV)	5th	Second Round
2018–19	4	Liga IV (AR)	1st (C, P)	
2017–18	4	Liga IV (AR)	5th	
2016–17	4	Liga IV (AR)	4th	
2015–16	4	Liga IV (AR)	4th	
2014–15	4	Liga IV (AR)	1st (C)	
2013–14	4	Liga IV (AR)	2nd	

Season	Tier	Division	Place	Cupa României
2012–13	4	Liga IV (AR)	14th	
2011–12	4	Liga IV (AR)	5th	
2010–11	4	Liga IV (AR)	6th	
2009–10	4	Liga IV (AR)	7th	
2000–01	3	Divizia C (Seria VIII)	10th (R)	
1999–00	3	Divizia C (Seria IV)	6th	Round of 32
1998–99	3	Divizia C (Seria IV)	4th	
1997–98	3	Divizia C (Seria IV)	5th	
1996–97	3	Divizia C (Seria IV)	15th	
1995–96	3	Divizia C (Seria IV)	9th	
1994–95	3	Divizia C (Seria IV)	14th	
1993–94	4	Divizia D (AR)	1st (C, P)	

== Notable former players ==
- (Romania) Vasile Arman
- (Romania) Gheorghe Cameniță
- (Romania) Dumitru Copil
- (Romania) Mihai Corsenți
- (Romania) Ionel Juncu
- (Romania) Cristian Munteanu
- (Romania) Dan Țapoș

== Former managers ==
- (Italy) Gian Pio del Monaco
- (Romania) Ștefan Dobra
- (Romania) Marius Drăguceanu
- (Romania) Silviu Frățilă
- (Romania) Dușan Gavrilovici
- (Romania) Matei Kocsik
- (Romania) Ionuț Popa (1998–1999)
- (Romania) Mihai Țârlea (2001–2012)
- (Romania) Dorel Mutică (2013–2014)
- (Romania) Dorel Mutică (2016–2017)
- (Romania) Romul Popețiu
- (Romania) Mihai Roșca
- (Romania) Sándor Schwartz
- (Romania) Alexandru Țamboi
- (Romania) Francisc Tisza
- (Romania) Dan Stupar (July 2018– June 2021)
- (Romania) Sorin Bălu (June 2021– April 2022)
- (Romania) Bogdan Bozian (April 2022– July 2022)
- (Romania) Mihai Petcuț (July 2022– July 2023)
- (Romania) Dan Stupar (July 2023– )
