= Patrick Pașcalău =

Romanian footballer (born 2005)

Personal information
- Full name: Patrick Nikolas Pașcalău
- Date of birth: 10 December 2005 (age 20)
- Place of birth: Arad, Romania
- Height: 1.83 m (6 ft 0 in)
- Position: Centre forward

Team information
- Current team: UTA Arad

Youth career
- –2022: UTA Arad

Senior career*
Years	Team	Apps	(Gls)
2022–	UTA Arad	4	(0)
2022	→ Crișul Chișineu-Criș (loan)		
2022	→ Dumbrăvița (loan)	8	(1)
2023	→ ASU Politehnica Timișoara (loan)	11	(0)

International career^{‡}
2023–	Romania U18	2	(0)
- * Club domestic league appearances and goals as of 13 December 2023 ‡ National team caps and goals as of 26 March 2023

Patrick Nikolas Pașcalău (born 10 December 2005) is a Romanian professional footballer who plays as a centre forward for Liga I club UTA Arad.

== Club career ==
=== UTA Arad ===
He made his Liga I debut for UTA Arad against CFR Cluj on 2 March 2023.
