= FC Zalău =

- Full name: Fotbal Club Zalău
- Nicknames: Zălăuanii (The Zalău People); Gruparea de sub Meseș (The Team Below The Meseș Hill)
- Short name: Zalău
- Founded: 2005
- Dissolved: 2017
- Ground: Municipal
- Capacity: 3,500
- 2016–17: Liga III, Seria V, 6th
Home colours	Away colours

Fotbal Club Zalău was a Romanian football team from Zalău, Sălaj County, founded in 2005 and dissolved in 2017 after encountered financial problems.

== History ==
FC Zalău was founded in the summer of 2005, in order to continue Zalău's football legacy after the dissolution of Armătura Zalău. The founder and owner of the new team was Ioan Morar, a local businessman, as well as a former business partner of Liviu Olar Pop, the main sponsor of Armătura Zalău. The club was enrolled in the Liga IV – Sălaj County (4th tier).

In their first season, under the guidance of Marius Pașca, Zălăuanii won the County Championship, but lost the promotion play-off against Universitatea 1919 Cluj-Napoca, the winner of Divizia D – Cluj County, 0–1 in a match played on neutral ground at the Municipal Stadium in Oradea.

Marius Pașca led the team below the Meseș Hill, in the 2006–07 season, to the second consecutive county title, losing again the promotion play-off 2–3 in front of FC Bihor II Tileagd, the champion of Bihor County, in a match played on neutral ground at the Clujana Stadium in Cluj-Napoca.

FC Zalău was finally promoted at the end of the 2007–08 season. Zălăuanii, with the same Marius Pașca as manager, won the third consecutive County Championship and the promotion play-off, 1–0 on neutral ground at the CUG Stadium in Cluj-Napoca, against Spicul Mocira, the champion of Maramureș County.

FC Zalău played for 9 years at the level of Liga III and even had intentions to promote in the second tier, at some time, but was finally dissolved in the summer of 2017, due to financial problems.

== Honours ==
Liga IV – Sălaj County

- Winners (3): 2005–06, 2006–07, 2007–08

== Notable former players ==
The footballers mentioned below have played at least 1 season for FC Zalău and also played in Liga I for another team.

- (Romania) Claudiu Cornaci
- (Romania) Vasile Jula
- (Romania) Florin Sabou
- (Romania) Grigore Turda

== Former managers ==
- (Romania) Vasile Jula (2013)
- (Romania) Marius Pașca
