= Samuel Zimța =

Romanian footballer

Personal information
- Full name: Samuel Giani Zimța
- Date of birth: 23 May 2000 (age 26)
- Place of birth: Drobeta Turnu Severin, Romania
- Height: 1.78 m (5 ft 10 in)
- Position: Midfielder

Youth career
- 2007–2010: Școala de Fotbal Gheorghe Popescu
- 2012–2016: Inter Milan
- 2016–2018: Virtus Entella
- 2018: Brescia

Senior career*
Years	Team	Apps	(Gls)
2018–2021	FC U Craiova	2	(0)
2021–2022	Viitorul Șimian		
2022	Zimbru Chișinău	8	(0)
2022–2023	Ripensia Timișoara	12	(2)
2023	Viitorul Șimian		
2023–2025	SCM Zalău	20	(2)
2025	Afumați	3	(0)

International career
2017	Romania U17	2	(0)
- * Club domestic league appearances and goals as of 30 August 2025

Samuel Giani Zimța (born 23 May 2000) is a Romanian professional footballer who plays as a midfielder.

== Club career ==
=== Zimbru Chișinău ===
He made his league debut on 12 March 2022 in Moldovan National Division match against FC Bălți.

== Honours ==
FC U Craiova

- Liga II: 2020–21
- Liga III: 2019–20

SCM Zalău

- Liga III: 2023–24
