= Oprișenești oil field =

Oil field in Brăila County, Romania

Oprişeneşti
- Country: Romania
- Region: Brăila County
- Offshore/onshore: onshore
- Coordinates: 45.1329°N 27.5396°E
- Operator: Petrom

Field history
- Discovery: 1958
- Start of development: 1958
- Start of production: 1960

Production
- Current production of oil: 1,600 barrels per day (~80,000 t/a)
- Estimated oil in place: 5 million tonnes (~ 5.91×10^{6} m^{3} or 37.2 million bbl)

The Oprişeneşti oil field is an oil field located in Ianca, Brăila County, Romania. It was discovered in 1958 and developed by Petrom. It began production in 1960 and produces oil. The total proven reserves of the Oprişeneşti oil field are around 37.2 million barrels (5 million tonnes), and production is centered on 1,600 barrels per day (250 m^{3}/d).
