= Vasile Jula =

Romanian footballer

Personal information
- Full name: Vasile Ilie Jula
- Date of birth: 13 December 1974 (age 51)
- Place of birth: Dej, Romania
- Height: 1.84 m (6 ft 0 in)
- Position: Defender

Youth career
- 1984–1992: Universitatea Cluj

Senior career*
Years	Team	Apps	(Gls)
1992–1993	Universitatea Cluj	1	(0)
1993–1994	Armătura Zalău (Note: The statistics for the 1993–94 Divizia B season are unavailable.)	3	(0)
1994–1999	Universitatea Cluj	111	(0)
1999–2004	Gloria Bistrița	102	(1)
2004–2007	CFR Cluj	74	(6)
2007–2008	Dacia Mioveni	13	(0)
2008–2013	FC Zalău		
Total		304+	(7+)

Managerial career
- 2013: FC Zalău
- 2019: Unirea Mirșid
- 2021: SCM Zalău (caretaker)
- * Club domestic league appearances and goals as of 1 March 2018 ‡ National team caps and goals as of 1 March 2018

Vasile Ilie "Lică" Jula (born 13 December 1974) is a retired Romanian footballer who played as a defender.

== Club career ==
Jula was born on 13 December 1974 in Dej, Romania and began playing junior-level football in 1984 at Universitatea Cluj. He made his Divizia A debut on 20 June 1993, playing for "U" under the guidance of coach Remus Vlad in a 5–1 away loss to Gloria Bistrița. Afterwards he spent one and a half seasons at Divizia B club Armătura Zalău. In the middle of the 1994–95 season, Jula returned to Universitatea.

In 1999, he joined Gloria Bistrița where he spent five seasons, the highlight of this period being a third place in the 2002–03 season. In 2004, Jula switched teams again, going to CFR Cluj. Under coach Dorinel Munteanu, he played eight games in the 2005 Intertoto Cup campaign as CFR got past Vėtra, Athletic Bilbao, Saint-Étienne and Žalgiris, scoring two goals —one against each of the Lithuanian teams— with the team reaching the final where they were defeated 4–2 on aggregate by Lens. He also helped The Railwaymen earn a third place in the 2006–07 season.

Jula moved to Dacia Mioveni for the following season where on 23 February 2008 he made his last Romanian first league appearance in a 3–0 away loss to Vaslui, totaling 301 matches with seven goals in the competition and 13 games with two goals in the Intertoto Cup. In 2008 he joined third league side FC Zalău where he played for five years, retiring afterwards.

== International career ==
In 2005, he was called up by coach Victor Pițurcă to play for Romania, but he was only a reserve during the 2006 World Cup qualification game against Finland.

== Managerial career ==
In the first part of the 2013–14 season, Jula was the manager of FC Zalău in the third league. In February 2019, he was appointed head coach at Unirea Mirșid, managing by the end of the season to earn promotion from the fourth to the third league. In April 2021, Jula was the caretaker manager of SCM Zalău.

== Honours ==
=== Player ===
CFR Cluj

- Intertoto Cup runner-up: 2005

=== Manager ===
Unirea Mirșid

- Liga IV: 2018–19
