= CS Viitorul Ianca =

Romanian football club

Viitorul Ianca
- Full name: Clubul Sportiv Viitorul Ianca
- Nicknames: Alb-vișinii (The White and Burgundies); Iancanii (The People from Ianca)
- Short name: Ianca
- Founded: 14 March 2003; 23 years ago
- Ground: Ștefan Vrăbioru
- Capacity: 4,000
- Owner: Ianca Town
- Chairman: Francisc Chiriac
- Manager: Nicușor Baldovin
- League: Liga IV
- 2025–26: Liga IV, Brăila County, 2nd of 9
Home colours	Away colours

Clubul Sportiv Viitorul Ianca, commonly known as Viitorul Ianca (Romanian pronunciation: [vi.iˈtorul ˈjaŋka]), or simply as Ianca, is a Romanian football club based in Ianca, Brăila County. Founded in 2003 as the second team of town, after Liga III member Petrolul Brăila, the club reached the third tier twice, now being the only active football club in the locality known for oil exploitation.

== History ==
=== Golden years of football in Ianca (1969–2007) ===
The history of professional football from Ianca started in 1969, with the foundation of Petrolul Brăila, club that promoted for the first time in the Divizia C at the end of the 1981–82 season. After only one season the club changed its name in Petrolul Ianca Brăila, in order to highlight the town where the home matches were played. Ianca is a well known place in Romania for oil exploitation, from there coming the name Petrolul (Oil in English) and the yellow and blue combination of colours, inspired by the one used by Petrolul Ploiești or Flacăra Moreni, other teams that represented towns in which the oil extraction was the main economical engine. Although launched harder in the Romanian football elite due to the smaller economic strength of the locality and the lower importance of the drilling rig, compared to Ploiești or Moreni, Petrolul Ianca Brăila had a brilliant journey in the late 1980s and with consistent developments during the 1990s.

In 1987 "the Oilmen" promoted for the first time in the Divizia B, but were relegated after only one season, finishing last, then after four seasons spent in the third tier, Petrolul promoted again and this time it was the same, relegating after one season, being ranked 13th out of 18. This was going to be their last participation in the second tier, but the club near Brăila continued to register important results in the third tier, where it was ranked second on three occasions: 1996, 1998 and 1999. Would be worth mentioning that the club changed again its name in 1994, returning to the name of Petrolul Brăila, but continuing to dispute its home matches at Ianca.

In the early 2000s, Iancanii were a common presence at the level of the Divizia C, making a last very good season and finishing second in 2005, then, after this result, things started to take a downturn and in 2007 Petrolul Brăila withdrew from championship and was declared bankrupt.

=== The fight for supremacy in town (2007–present) ===
The 2008 financial crisis took Petrolul Ianca Brăila to dissolution and one of the new clubs from the city that tried to continue the football tradition was Viitorul Ianca. Founded on 14 March 2003, the white and burgundies fought hard for supremacy in the town against clubs such as CSO Ianca (sponsored by Town of Ianca) and Fortino Ianca (private club, sponsored by Fortino company). CSO promoted in the Liga III in 2007 but did not cope financially and was disbanded after only one season. In 2009 Viitorul promoted as well, also being reorganized administratively, reason for which the year 2009 appears on the logo of the club, but has relegated after one season spent at this level. The third team that tried to be the main team of the town, Fortino, won Liga IV – Brăila County in 2012, but subsequently lost the promotion play-off and was dissolved.

With CSO and Fortino dissolved, Viitorul Ianca took its chance and started to impose itself as the new team of Ianca, finally being also supported by the town, both financially and emotionally and promoting back in the Liga III in 2019, when it won Liga IV – Brăila County and the promotion play-off match against Mausoleul Mărășești, Vrancea County champions.

== Ground ==
Viitorul Ianca plays its home matches on the Ștefan Vrăbioru Stadium in Ianca, with a capacity of 4,000 seats. The stadium was built in the 1980s and renovated in 2009 with the support of the Town of Ianca and the Brăila County Youth and Sport Directorate. During the 2000s, the stadium was renamed as Ștefan Vrăbioru, in the honour of the footballer born in Ianca and who died in 1999 on the football pitch at the age of only 23, during a match between Rapid București and Astra Ploiești.

== Honours ==
Liga IV – Brăila County

- Winners (2): 2008–09, 2018–19
- Runners-up (2): 2015–16, 2017–18

Cupa României – Brăila County

- Winners (3): 2016–17, 2017–18, 2018–19
- Runners-up (1): 2014–15

== League history ==
Season	Tier	Division	Place	Cupa României
2023–24	3	Liga III (Seria II)	7th (R)	Play-off round
2022–23	3	Liga III (Seria II)	7th	
2021–22	3	Liga III (Seria II)	6th	
2020–21	3	Liga III (Seria II)	5th	
2019–20	3	Liga III (Seria II)	7th	
2018–19	4	Liga IV (BR)	1st (C, P)	
2017–18	4	Liga IV (BR)	2nd	
2016–17	4	Liga IV (BR)	3rd	

Season	Tier	Division	Place	Cupa României
2015–16	4	Liga IV (BR)	2nd	
2014–15	4	Liga IV (BR)	7th	
2013–14	4	Liga IV (BR)	4th	
2012–13	4	Liga IV (BR)	11th	
2011–12	5	Liga V (Seria I)	3rd	
2009–10	3	Liga III (Seria II)	16th (R)	
2008–09	4	Liga IV (BR)	1st (C, P)	

== Former managers ==
- (Romania) Laurențiu Ivan (2019–2020)
- (Romania) Viorel Tănase (2023)
