= Iulian Carabela =

Romanian professional footballer

Personal information
- Date of birth: 11 April 1996 (age 30)
- Place of birth: Cernavodă, Romania
- Height: 1.77 m (5 ft 10 in)
- Position: Left back

Team information
- Current team: Dobrudzha Dobrich
- Number: 22

Youth career
- –2014: Axiopolis Cernavodă

Senior career*
Years	Team	Apps	(Gls)
2014–2015	Axiopolis Cernavodă		
2015	Delta Dobrogea Tulcea		
2016–2018	Juventus București	58	(1)
2018	→ ACS Poli Timișoara (loan)	0	(0)
2019	Aerostar Bacău	15	(0)
2019–2021	Farul Constanța	32	(0)
2021–2022	Unirea Constanța	16	(0)
2022–2024	Axiopolis Cernavodă	24	(10)
2025	Agricola Borcea	3	(1)
2026	Olten		
2026–	Dobrudzha Dobrich	4	(0)
- * Club domestic league appearances and goals as of 11 November 2026

Iulian Carabela (born 11 April 1996) is a Romanian professional footballer who plays as a left back for Bulgarian Second League club Dobrudzha Dobrich.

== Honours ==
Juventus București

- Liga II: 2016–17

Axiopolis Cernavodă

- Liga IV – Constanța County: 2022–23
