= Ideal Stadium =

Stadium in Romania

- Interactive map of Ideal Stadium
- Address: Str. Dacia 5
- Location: Cernavodă, Romania
- Coordinates: 44°20′14″N 28°01′55.6″E
- Owner: Town of Cernavodă
- Operator: Axiopolis Cernavodă
- Capacity: 721
- Surface: Grass

Construction
- Opened: 1930s
- Renovated: 2020–2022

Tenant
- Axiopolis Cernavodă (1930–2016, 2022–present)

The Ideal Stadium is a multi-purpose stadium in Cernavodă, Romania. The stadium has a capacity of 721 seats and is currently used mostly for football matches, mainly of the local football club, Axiopolis Cernavodă. Ideal Stadium was completely renovated between 2020 and 2022 and was inaugurated on 1 June 2022, in a match between Axiopolis and CS Medgidia. After the renovations, the football ground benefits of 721 seats (700 seats for spectators, 7 seats for disabled spectators as well as 14 protocol seats), an irrigation system, floodlight installation, athletics track (3,106 m2), 41 parking spaces for cars and 2 specially arranged spaces for buses.
