= Dumitru Copil =

Romanian footballer

Personal information
- Full name: Dumitru Alexandru Copil
- Date of birth: 14 March 1990 (age 36)
- Place of birth: Arad, Romania
- Position: Midfielder

Team information
- Current team: Unirea Sântana
- Number: 10

Youth career
- Atletico Arad
- Luceafărul București

Senior career*
Years	Team	Apps	(Gls)
2007–2009	Heart of Midlothian	0	(0)
2009–2014	Gloria Arad		
2009–2010	→ UTA Arad (loan)	6	(1)
2010–2012	→ Bihor Oradea (loan)	7	(0)
2012–2013	→ Jiul Petroșani (loan)		
2013–2013	→ Șoimii Pâncota (loan)		
2013–2014	→ Ineu (loan)		
2014–2017	UTA Arad	98	(16)
2017	Șoimii Lipova		
2018	Gloria LT Cermei	12	(2)
2018–2019	Progresul Pecica	9	(1)
2020	Frontiera Curtici		
2021–2023	Socodor	11	(0)
2024–	Unirea Sântana		
- * Club domestic league appearances and goals as of 22:30, 6 January 2025 (UTC)

Dumitru Alexandru Copil (born 14 March 1990) is a Romanian footballer, who plays as a midfielder for Liga IV side Unirea Sântana.

== Career ==
=== Early career ===
Copil began his career at Atletico Arad, and spent time at the Luceafărul București development centre. He came to prominence in December 2006, when it was reported that Liverpool and Celtic were interested in signing him. He was described in the press as "the new Hagi".

=== Heart of Midlothian ===
Heart of Midlothian won the race to sign Copil, paying a fee in the region of £125,000 to secure him to a two-year deal with a further five-year option. His parents were flown over from Arad to Edinburgh to accompany him.

In November 2007 the magazine World Soccer named Copil among the top 50 young footballers in the world. However, he was unable to break into Hearts' first-team and went AWOL in March 2008, returning to Arad after being substituted in a Youth Cup tie.

He was persuaded to return, but told to stay away until pre-season training began in June 2008. The Lithuanian owners of the club suspected that he was only coming back in order to be paid over the summer break. Copil's homesickness and frustration at his absence of first-team football continued in 2008–09, with Hearts' manager Stephen Frail stating that he was not yet good enough to play in the SPL.

Copil left Hearts in January 2009 at the culmination of his initial two-year deal. Hearts had reneged on the five-year option, but offered a one-year extension which they claimed entitled them to a transfer fee when he moved on.

=== Return to Romania ===
While AWOL from Hearts, Copil had announced his intention to train with Dinamo București, but he rejoined Atletico Arad on transfer deadline day. After playing in the first round of the 2009–10 Cupa României for Gloria Arad, he joined UTA Arad on loan.

In June 2010 he was linked with a move to Swindon Town. Swindon distanced themselves from the move, revealing that Copil had been on a week's trial with them in March 2010, but they could not get clearance to play him in the reserves.

Between 2010 and 2013, Copil spent brief periods with various Romanian clubs, before being released by CS Ineu in 2014.

=== International career ===
Copil has represented Romania at U-17 level.
