= Ștefan Vrăbioru Stadium =

Romanian stadium

- Interactive map of Ștefan Vrăbioru Stadium
- Former names: Orășenesc
- Address: Str. Primăverii, nr. 74
- Location: Ianca, Romania
- Coordinates: 45°08′10.1″N 27°28′14.6″E
- Owner: Town of Ianca
- Operator: Viitorul Ianca
- Capacity: 4,000 seated
- Surface: Grass

Construction
- Opened: 1980s
- Renovated: 2009

Tenants
- Petrolul Ianca Brăila (1969–2007); CSO Ianca (2002–2007); Viitorul Ianca (2003–present); Fortino Ianca (2008–2011)

The Ștefan Vrăbioru Stadium is a multi-use stadium in Ianca, Romania, it is used mostly for football matches and is the home ground of Viitorul Ianca. The stadium was built in the 1980s, has a capacity of 4,000 seats and was renovated in 2009 with the support of the Town of Ianca and the Brăila County Youth and Sport Directorate. During the 2000s, the stadium was renamed as Ștefan Vrăbioru, in the honour of the footballer born in Ianca and who died in 1999 on the football pitch at the age of only 23, during a match between Rapid București and Astra Ploiești.

In the past, the stadium was also the home ground of football teams such as: Petrolul Ianca Brăila, CSO Ianca or Fortino Ianca.
