= Stadionul Tineretului (Lugoj) =

Multi-use stadium in Lugoj, Romania

- Interactive map of Stadionul Tineretului
- Former names: Stadionul Vulturii
- Address: Str. Țesătorilor, nr. 1
- Location: Lugoj, Romania
- Coordinates: 45°40′27.68″N 21°54′38.61″E
- Owner: Municipality of Lugoj
- Operator: CSM Lugoj
- Capacity: 6,000 (3,000 seated)
- Surface: Grass

Construction
- Opened: 1920s
- Renovated: 2005

Tenants
- Vulturii Lugoj (1920–2002); Auxerre Lugoj (2002–2007); CSM Lugoj (2009–present)

Stadionul Tineretului is a multi-use stadium in Lugoj, Romania. It is used mostly for football matches and is the home ground of CSM Lugoj. The stadium holds 6,000 people.
