= Progresul Stadium (Pecica) =

Sports stadium in Romania

- Interactive map of Progresul Stadium
- Former names: Stadionul Comunal (1920–1992); Petrom Stadium (1992–2004)
- Address: Strada 340
- Location: Pecica, Romania
- Coordinates: 46°09′09″N 21°03′46″E
- Owner: Town of Pecica
- Operator: Progresul Pecica
- Capacity: 2,000 (1,500 seated)
- Surface: Grass

Construction
- Opened: 1920s
- Renovated: 1960s, 1990s

Tenants
- Virtutea Pecica (1921–1949); Progresul Pecica (1949–present); West Petrom Pecica (2001–2004)

The Progresul Stadium is a multi-purpose stadium in Pecica, Romania. It is currently used mostly for football matches and is the home ground of Progresul Pecica. The stadium holds about 2,000 people and has 1,500 seats. In the past was also the home ground of Virtutea Pecica and West Petrom Pecica (club that also included Progresul from 1992 until 2001).

The stadium was opened in the 1920s and over time it has gone through some modernization and renovation processes, but still retaining its vintage style. The stadium was known in the past as Comunal Stadium or Petrom Stadium and the largest number of spectators recorded was of 5–6,000, on 21 September 1999, at the match between West Petrom Pecica and Steaua București.
