= Stadionul CUG =

Romanian stadium

- Stadionul CFR II
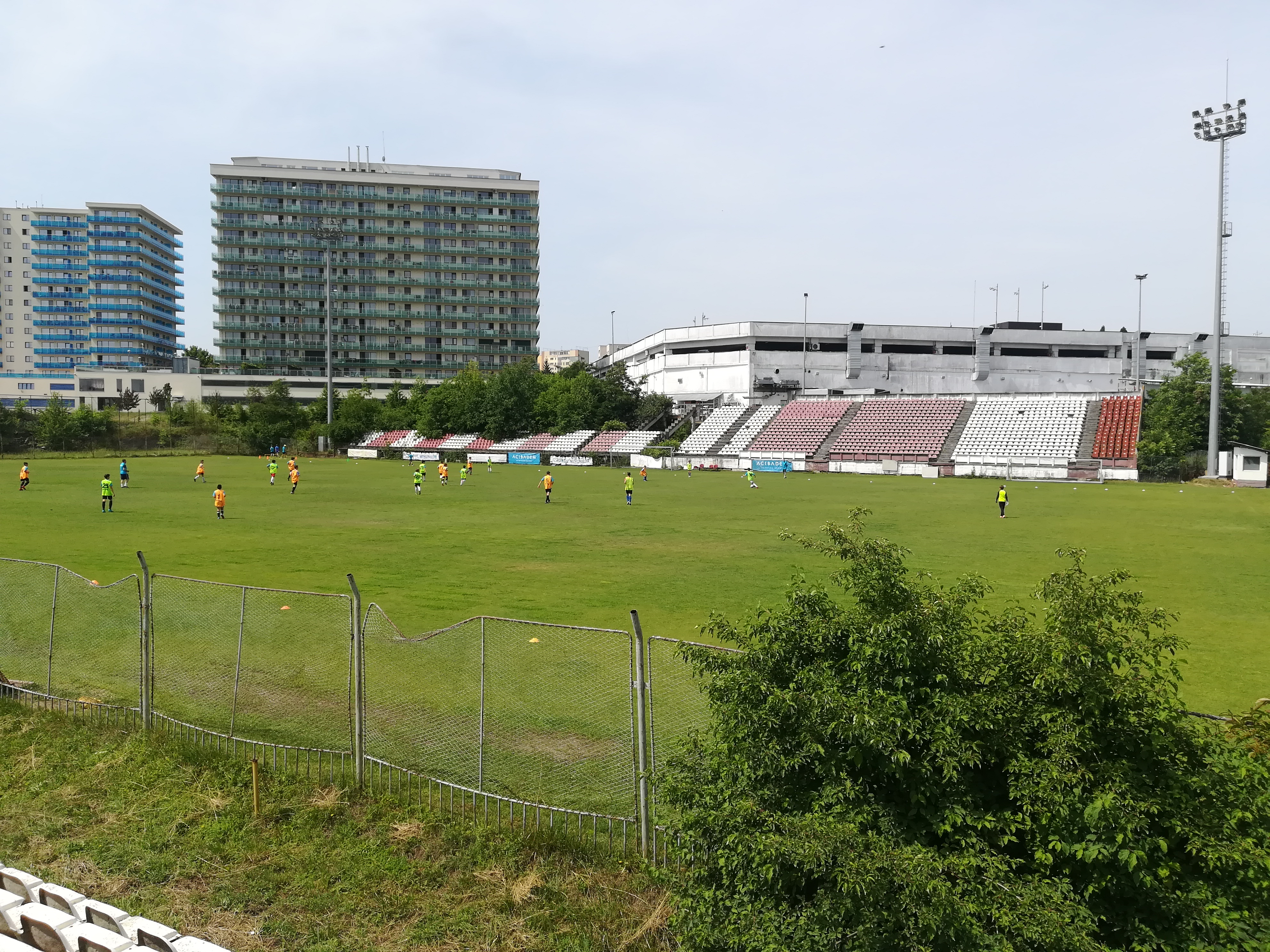
- Interactive map of Stadionul CUG
- Former names: Baza Sportivă CUG
- Address: Str. Alexandru Vaida Voevod
- Location: Cluj-Napoca, Romania
- Coordinates: 46°46′23.2″N 23°37′53″E
- Owner: S.C. Termorom S.A.
- Operator: CFR Cluj
- Capacity: 3,000
- Surface: Grass

Construction
- Opened: 1970
- Renovated: 2007

Tenants
- CUG Cluj; CFR II Cluj (2007–2009)

Stadionul CUG, formerly known as Baza Sportivă CUG, is a multi-use stadium in Cluj-Napoca, Romania. The stadium holds 3,000 people and is used mostly for CFR Cluj's youth squads matches and training. In the past the stadium was also used for CFR II Cluj matches and for some friendly matches of CFR Cluj.

Inaugurated in the early 1970s as a modern sports base, the complex stretched over an area of 65,669 square meters and included a football stadium, a clay football field, an artificial turf football field, a tennis and a handball court. The sports base was the property of CUG (Combinatul de Utilaj Greu - Heavy Machinery Factory), a name with which the base has remained until today.

In 2005, the Cluj County Council and the Cluj-Napoca Municipality had discussions to form a partnership with the companies De.Be.Co and S.C. Univers T S.A. Cluj-Napoca. After 2 years, on 10 November 2007, Iulius Mall was inaugurated, which was built on an area of approximately 43,000 square meters, the sports base being restricted only to the football stadium with an area of 24,983 square meters, so from that date Baza Sportivă CUG (CUG Sports Base) has become just Stadionul CUG (CUG Stadium).
