= Stadionul Crișul (Chișineu-Criș) =

Stadium in Chișineu-Criș, Romania

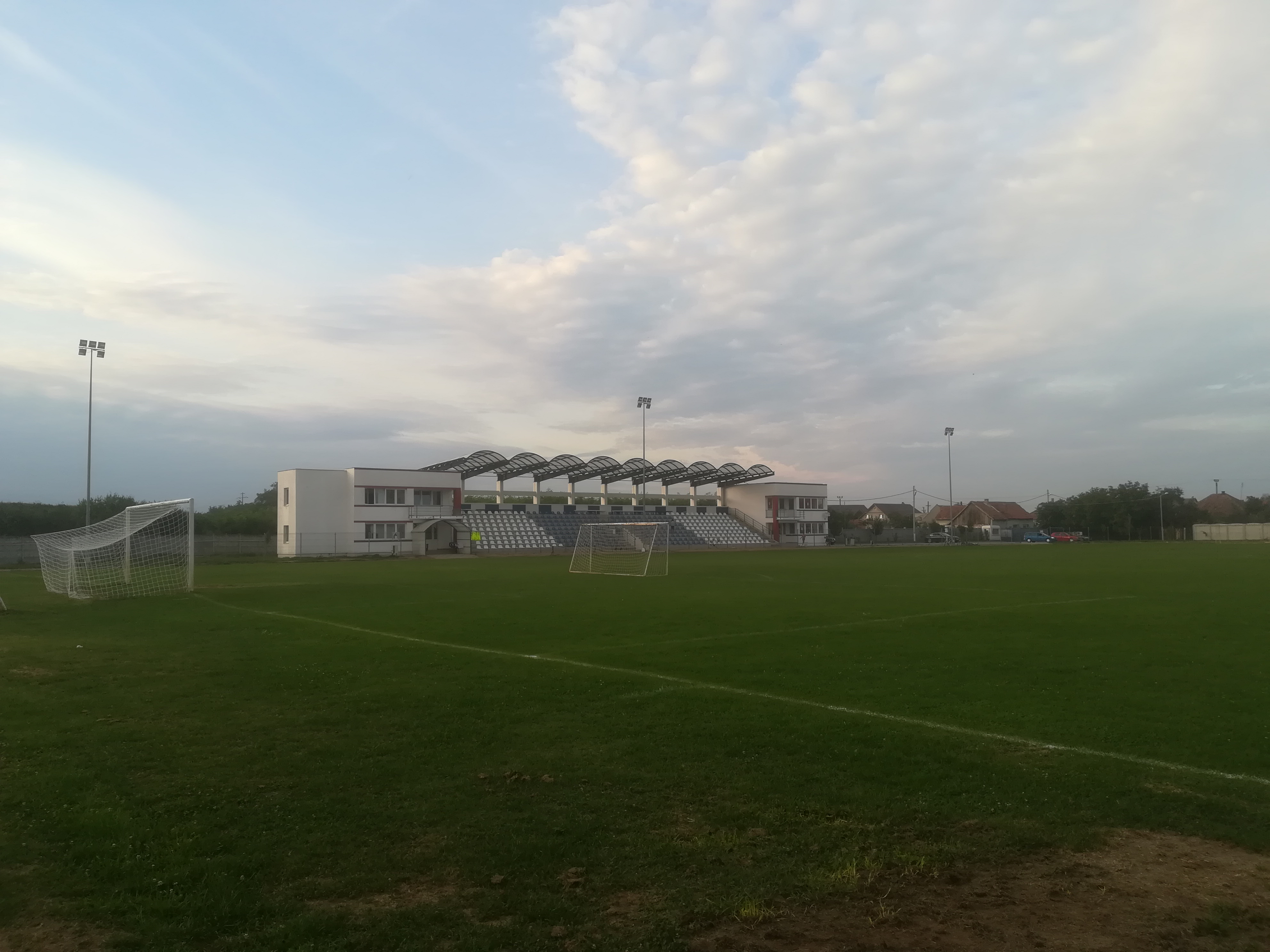
- Interactive map of Stadionul Crișul
- Address: Str. Vlad Țepeș
- Location: Chișineu-Criș, Romania
- Coordinates: 46°31′19.6″N 21°30′39″E
- Owner: Town of Chișineu-Criș
- Operator: Crișul Chișineu-Criș
- Capacity: 2,000 (500 seated)
- Surface: Grass

Construction
- Opened: 1950s
- Renovated: 2012–2014

Tenant
- Crișul Chișineu-Criș (1954–present)

Stadionul Crișul is a multi-purpose stadium in Chișineu-Criș, Romania. It is currently used mostly for football matches and is the home ground of Crișul Chișineu-Criș. The stadium holds 2,000 people and between 2012 and 2014 was renovated and upgraded, now having a new covered stand with 500 places on seats.
