= Ianca =

- Town
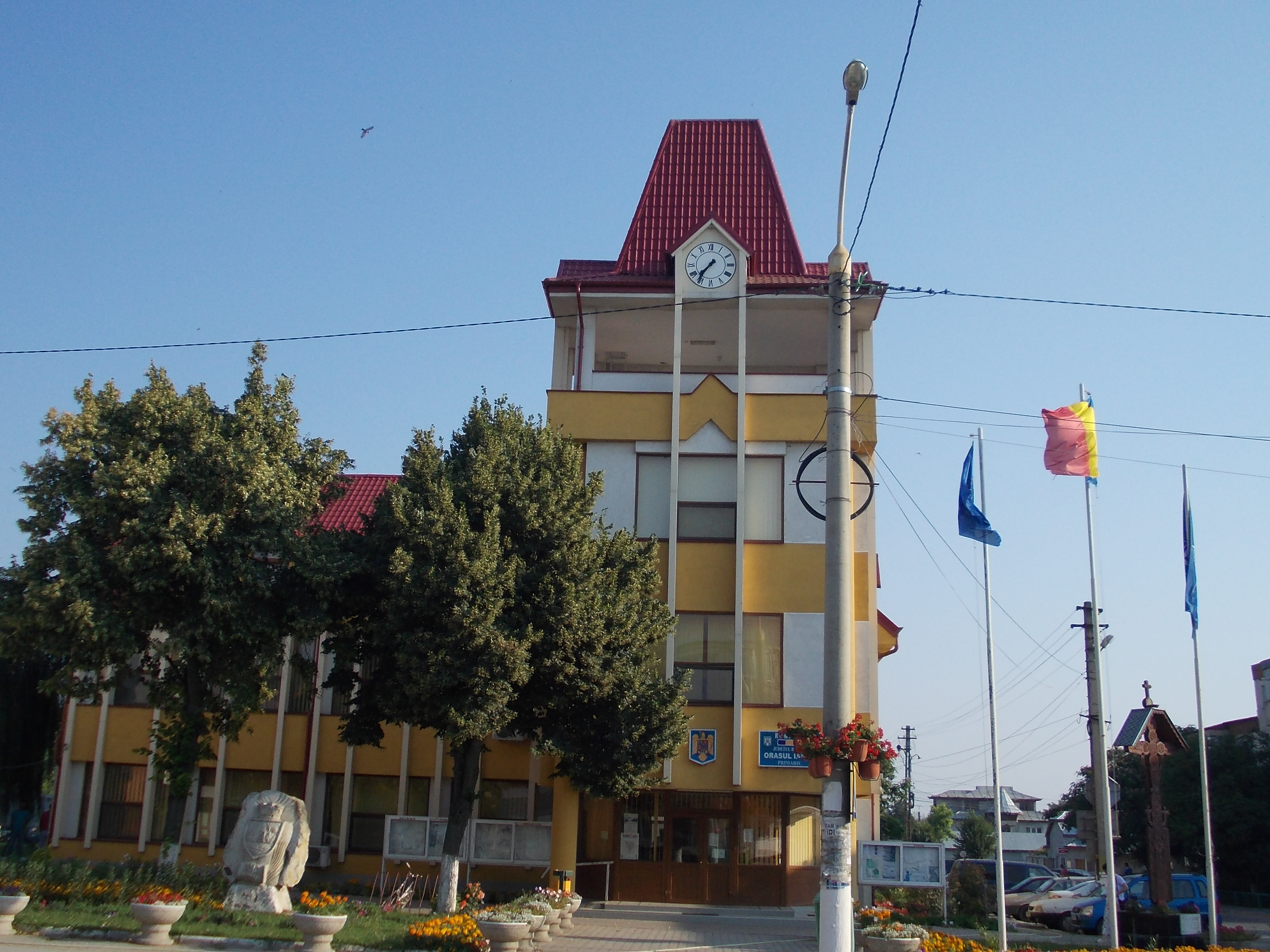
- Ianca town hall

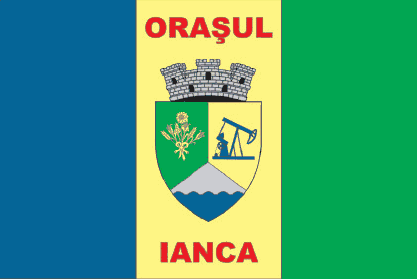
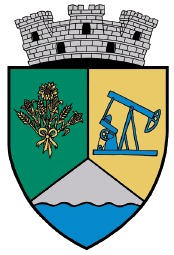
- Flag Coat of arms

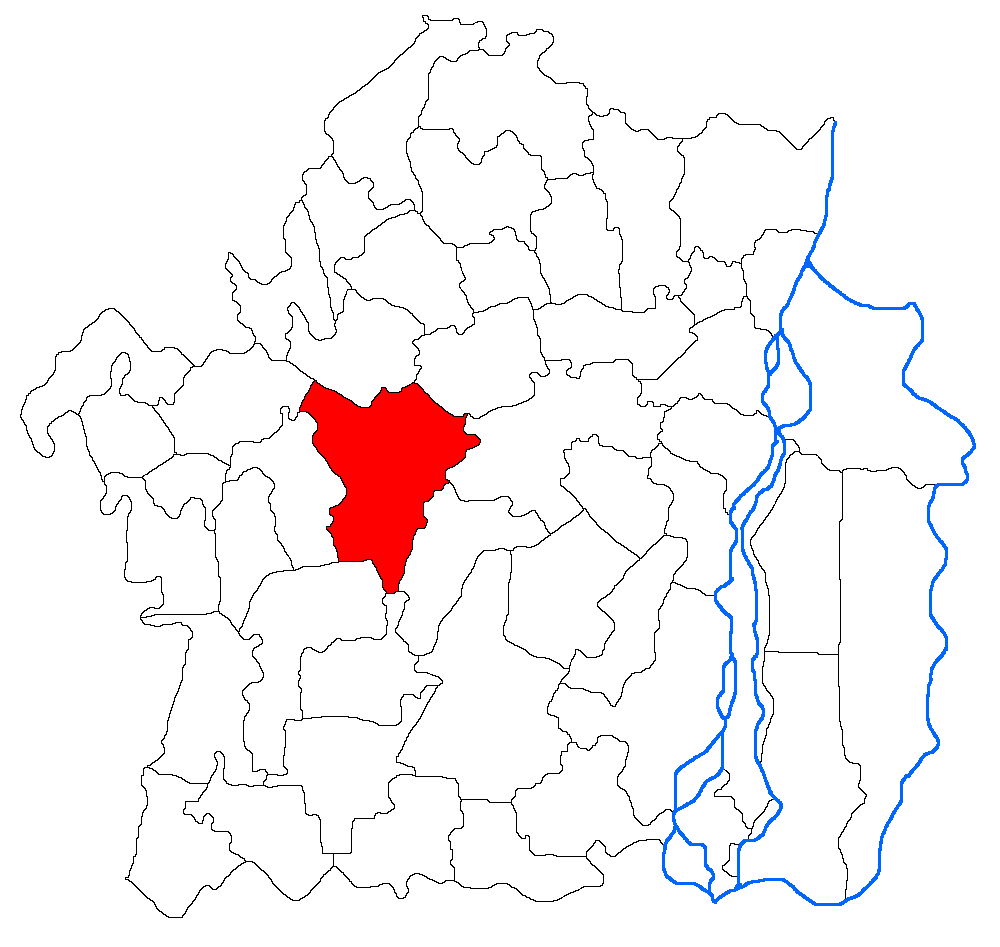
- Location in Brăila County

- Location in Romania
- Coordinates: 45°8′6″N 27°28′29″E
- Country: Romania
- County: Brăila

Government
  - Mayor (2024–2028): Ionel Epureanu (PSD)
- Area: 186.14 km^{2} (71.87 sq mi)
- Elevation: 40 m (130 ft)
- Population (2021-12-01): 8,969
  - Density: 48.18/km^{2} (124.8/sq mi)
- Time zone: UTC+02:00 (EET)
  - Summer (DST): UTC+03:00 (EEST)
- Postal code: 815200
- Area code: (+40) 02 39
- Vehicle reg.: BR
- Website: www.primaria-ianca.ro

Ianca (Romanian pronunciation: [ˈjaŋka]) is a town in Brăila County, Muntenia, Romania. With a population of 8,969 people as of 2021, it is the second-largest urban locality in the county. The town's area is 186 km^{2} (72 sq mi), of which 10.9 km^{2} (4.2 sq mi) have the status of residential area. The town administers six villages: Berlești, Gara Ianca, Oprișenești, Perișoru, Plopu, and Târlele Filiu.

== Geography ==
The town is situated at the northern edge of the Bărăgan Plain, at an altitude of 40 m (130 ft). It is located in the central part of the county, 44 km (27 mi) southwest of the county seat, Brăila.

== History ==
The first mention of the settlement dates to 1834. At the end of the 19th century, it comprised two villages (Ianca and Niculești); with a population of 1,483, it was the residence of plasa Ianca of Brăila County. In 1950, Ianca commune became part of the Făurei raion of Galați Region. It became again part of Brăila County in 1968, and it officially became a town in 1989, as a result of the Romanian rural systematization program.

From 1941 to 2001 Ianca was the home of the 49th Air Base of the Romanian Air Force; since July 2022, the airfield is owned by the Romanian Aeroclub.

== Demographics ==
Historical population
Year	Pop.	±%
1992	11,736	—
2002	12,886	+9.8%
2011	10,049	−22.0%
2021	8,969	−10.7%
Source: Census data

At the 2021 census, Ianca had a population of 8,969; of those, 88.77% were Romanians and 2% Roma.

== Natives ==
- Virgil Huzum (1905 – 1987), poet
- Ion Theodorescu-Sion (1882 – 1939), painter

== Transportation and economy ==
Ianca is crossed by the national road DN2B, which runs from Buzău to Galați. The Ianca and Ianca Sat train stations serve the CFR Main Line 700, which connects Bucharest to Brăila, Galați, and the Moldova border at Giurgiulești.

The Oprișenești oil field is located on the administrative territory of the town.

== Sports ==
The football club Viitorul Ianca is based here; the home ground of the club is the Ștefan Vrăbioru Stadium.

== International relations ==
Ianca is twinned with La Chapelle-sur-Erdre, France since 2005.
