= Rădăuți Municipal Stadium =

Multi-use stadium in Rădăuți, Romania

- Interactive map of Rădăuți Municipal Stadium
- Address: Str. Ștefan cel Mare, nr. 78
- Location: Rădăuți, Romania
- Coordinates: 47°50′30.7″N 25°54′13″E
- Owner: Municipality of Rădăuți
- Operator: Bucovina Rădăuți
- Capacity: 2,000 (0 seated)
- Surface: Grass

Construction
- Opened: 1930
- Renovated: 2017

Tenants
- Hatmanul Luca Arbore Rădăuți; Jahn Rădăuți; Hagwiruch Rădăuți; Bucovina Rădăuți (1956–present)

The Rădăuți Municipal Stadium is a multi-purpose stadium in Rădăuți, Romania. It is used mostly for football matches and is the home ground of Bucovina Rădăuți. The stadium holds 2,000 people.
