= CS Axiopolis Cernavodă =

Romanian football club

Axiopolis Cernavodă
- Full name: Clubul Sportiv; Axiopolis Cernavodă
- Nicknames: Șoimii (The Falcons); Cernăvodenii (The People from Cernavodă); Gruparea de la Dunăre (The Team near the Danube)
- Short name: Axiopolis
- Founded: 1927; 99 years ago as Mercur Cernavodă; 1949; 77 years ago as Dunărea Cernavodă; 2001; 25 years ago as Axiopolis Cernavodă
- Ground: Ideal / Trust
- Capacity: 721 / 5,000 (100 seated)
- Owner: Cernavodă Town
- Chairman: Adrian Turcu
- Manager: Gheorghe Mina
- League: Liga III
- 2025–26: Liga III, Seria III, 8th
- Website: csaxiopolis.com
Home colours	Away colours	Third colours

Clubul Sportiv Axiopolis Cernavodă, commonly known as Axiopolis Cernavodă, or simply as Axiopolis, is a Romanian football club based in Cernavodă, Constanța County, currently playing in the Liga III.

Axipolis was originally founded in 1927, under the name of Mercur Cernavodă and played its first home ground match in 1930. After the end of World War II the club was re-founded as Dunărea Cernavodă and for the next approx. 20 years played mostly at county and regional level under various names, such as Ideal Cernavodă, Progresul Cernavodă, Constructorul Cernavodă or Dunărea Cernavodă. Dunărea promoted for the second time in the third tier in 1974, and remained at that level until 1984, when it relegated back. In this period, the team based in Cernavodă obtained its best ranking, a 3rd place at the end of the 1979–80 season. Renamed as Șoimii Cernavodă in 1976, the team remained at county level for the next 21 years, in 2005 promoting again, this time under the name of Axiopolis Cernavodă. Axiopolis relegated back after only one season and promoted again only 10 years later, now running its second best period in the history of the club.

== History ==
Axiopolis Cernavodă was originally founded in 1927, under the name of Mercur Cernavodă. In 1930, Mercur played its first home match (and the first football match in the history of Cernavodă), a 6–0 victory against the team of Medgidia.

After the end of World War II, in 1949, Mercur was re-founded under the name of Dunărea Cernavodă. For the next 18 years (between 1950 and 1968) Dunărea played in the county and regional championships (also under names such as Progresul Cernavodă or Constructorul Cernavodă), finally promoting to Divizia C at the end of the 1967–68 season, but this time under the name of Ideal Cernavodă. The squad that obtained this performance was composed of the following players: Marinciu, Goagă, Ardeleanu, Pisică, Hristu, Badea, Coroiu, Gora, Izet, Bușteanu, Marinescu, Conete, Gropoșilă, Catrina, Iulian, Constantinescu, Valerică, Vlădăreanu, Poenaru, Ghelase and Cozma. The miracle lasted only for one season, in 1969 Ideal was relegated back to county championship, after a bad ranking, 15th out of 16. Until 1974, Ideal played only at the level of Divizia D, a period in which it lost the promotion to the detriment of teams such as Victoria Medgidia, Șantierul Naval Constanța, Știința Constanța or Voința Constanța.

In 1974, cernăvodenii promoted back to Divizia C, again under the name of Dunărea Cernavodă. This promotion was followed by the most fruitful period in the history of football from Cernavodă, Dunărea (then renamed since 1976 as Șoimii Cernavodă) playing for 11 consecutive seasons at the level of the third tier. The first six seasons were very good for "the Team near the Danube", which was ranked as follows: 8th out of 16 (1974–75 and 1976–77), 9th out of 16 (1975–76 and 1977–78), 5th out of 16 (1978–79) and 3rd out of 16 (1979–80). The 3rd place obtained at the end of the 1979–80 was the best ranking in the history of the club, then Șoimii fell in the last part of the league table, finishing 14th out of 16 (1980–81), 15th out of 16 (1981–82), 13th out of 16 (1982–83) and 16th out of 16 (1983–84), this last ranking also brought the relegation to Divizia D, level where "the yellow and blues" remained for the next 21 years.

In 2001, Șoimii Cernavodă was renamed as Axiopolis Cernavodă, then at the end of the 2004–05 season, the team based in Cernavodă promoted back to Divizia C, but the joy was short-lived one, similar to the 1968 promotion, the team relegated back after only one season, after it was ranked last in its series (14th out of 14). Ten years later, Axiopolis won Liga IV Constanța and the promotion play-off against Venus Independeța (Liga IV Călărași winners), thus promoting back to Liga III.

Since the 2016 promotion, Axiopolis is still running the second best period in the history of the club, now reaching its fifth consecutive season in the third tier, also obtaining at the end of the 2017–18 season the second best ranking in the history of "the yellow and blues", 4th place (out of 14).

== Ground ==
Axiopolis Cernavodă plays its home matches on Ideal Stadium in Cernavodă, Constanța County, with a capacity of 721 seats. "The Hawks" also plays some of their matches on Trust Stadium in Cernavodă, Constanța County, with a capacity of 5,000 people (100 on seats). First football match played on Trust ground was in 1930, a match between local team, Mercur Cernavodă, and a team from Medgidia, match ended with the victory of Mercur, 6–0.

== Honours ==
=== Leagues ===
- Liga IV – Constanța County
  - Winners (4): 1973–74, 2004–05, 2015–16, 2022–23
  - Runners-up (1): 2014–15
- Regional Championship
  - Winners (1): 1967–68

=== Cups ===
- Cupa României – Regional Phase (South-East)
  - Winners (1): 2022–23

== Players ==
=== First-team squad ===
As of 10 September 2024

Note: Flags indicate national team as defined under FIFA eligibility rules; some limited exceptions apply. Players may hold more than one non-FIFA nationality.

No.	Pos.	Nation	Player
1	GK	ROU	Eduardo Bardan
3	MF	ROU	Kevin Trofim
4	DF	ROU	Emre Osman
5	MF	FRA	Yaya Diaby
6	DF	ROU	Cosmin Dane
7	FW	ROU	Robert Ursache
8	MF	ROU	Marian Chiriţoiu
9	MF	ROU	Alexandru Stoica
10	DF	ROU	Iulian Carabela
12	GK	ROU	Cristian Micu
13	FW	ROU	Sasha Agiveli

No.	Pos.	Nation	Player
14	MF	ROU	David Popescu
15	MF	ROU	Ciprian Ciocoiu
16	MF	ROU	Florin Pîrîu
17	FW	ROU	Nayati Jidovu
18	DF	ROU	Alin Ștefănescu
19	DF	ROU	Alexandru Sabangeanu
20	MF	ROU	Alexandru Vieru (Captain)
21	MF	ROU	Robert Pîslaru
22	DF	FRA	Alassane Diaby
29	FW	ROU	Alin Florescu
33	GK	ROU	Sabin Stănciulescu

=== Out on loan ===
Note: Flags indicate national team as defined under FIFA eligibility rules; some limited exceptions apply. Players may hold more than one non-FIFA nationality.

No. / Pos. / Nation / Player	No. / Pos. / Nation / Player

== Club Officials ==
=== Board of directors ===
Role	Name
Owner	(Romania) Cernavodă Town
President	(Romania) Adrian Turcu
Director of Football	(Romania) Cătălin Doană

=== Current technical staff ===
Role	Name
Manager	(Romania) Gheorghe Mina
Assistant Coach	(Romania) Cristian Carapcea
Goalkeeping Coach	(Romania) Dobrin Chirilă

== Chronology of names ==
Name	Period
Mercur Cernavodă	1927–1949
Dunărea Cernavodă	1949–1960
Progresul Cernavodă	1960–1964
Constructorul Cernavodă	1964–1966
Ideal Cernavodă	1966–1970
Dunărea Cernavodă	1970–1976
Șoimii Cernavodă	1976–2001
Axiopolis Cernavodă	2001–2010
CS Cernavodă	2010–2013
Axiopolis Cernavodă	2013–present

== League history ==
Season	Tier	Division	Place	Cupa României
2025–26	3	Liga III (Seria III)	TBD	
2024–25	3	Liga III (Seria III)	8th	
2023–24	3	Liga III (Seria III)	7th	
2022–23	4	Liga IV (CT)	1st (C, P)	
2020–21	3	Liga III (Seria III)	4th (R)	
2019–20	3	Liga III (Seria II)	13th	
2018–19	3	Liga III (Seria II)	9th	
2017–18	3	Liga III (Seria II)	4th	
2016–17	3	Liga III (Seria II)	11th	
2015–16	4	Liga IV (CT)	1st (C, P)	
2014–15	4	Liga IV (CT)	2nd	
