= Stadionul Municipal (Zalău) =

Romanian stadium

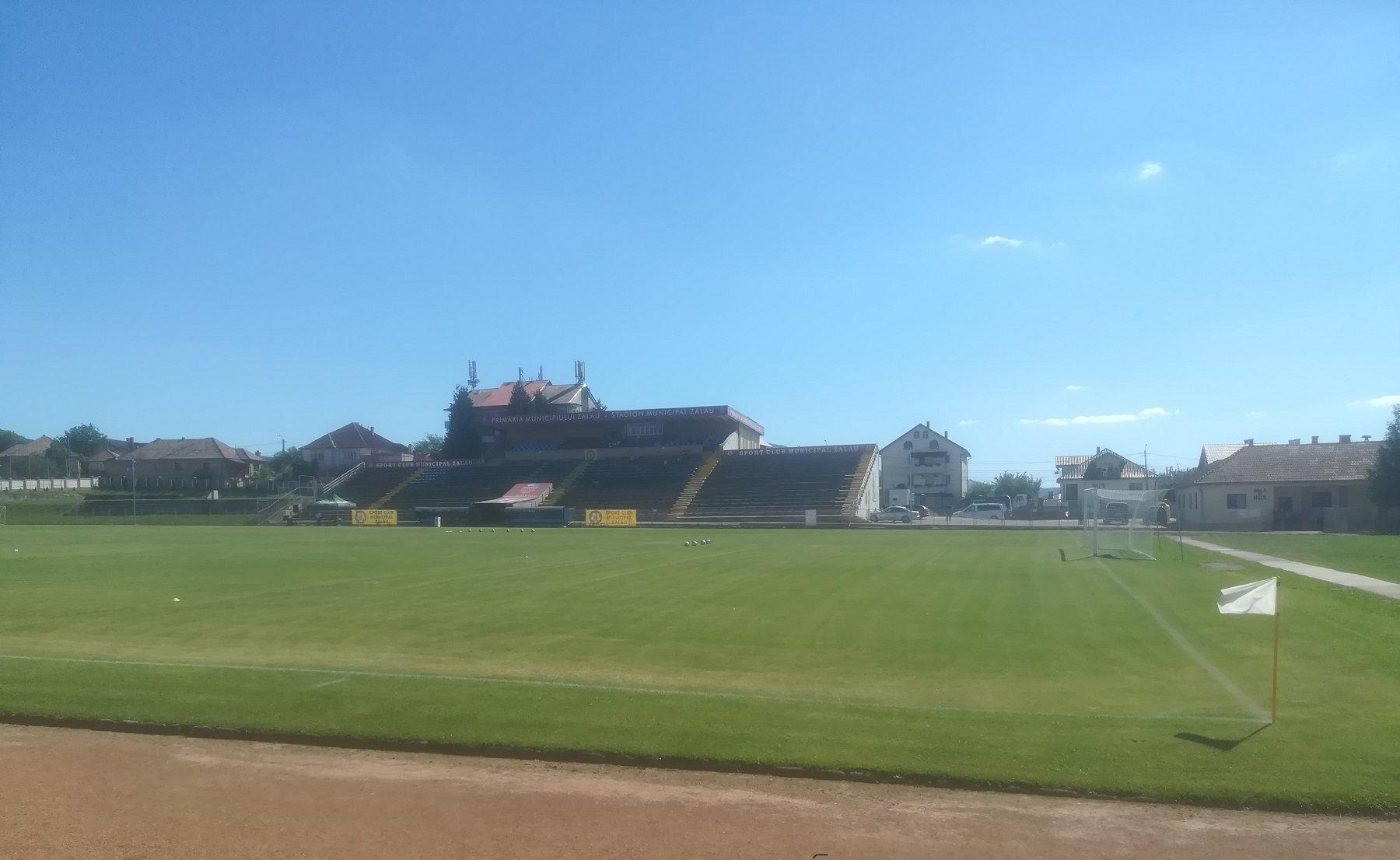
- Interactive map of Stadionul Municipal
- Former names: Armătura
- Address: Str. Stadionului, nr. 5
- Location: Zalău, Romania
- Coordinates: 47°10′22.1″N 23°03′35.2″E
- Owner: Municipality of Zalău
- Operator: SCM Zalău
- Capacity: 3,500 (1,000 seated)
- Surface: Grass

Construction
- Opened: 1946
- Renovated: 2007, 2017–2018

Tenants
- Armătura Zalău (1946–2005); FC Zalău (2005–2017); SCM Zalău (2019–present)

Stadionul Municipal is a multi-use stadium in Zalău, Romania. It is known between the residents of Zalău as Maracana of Zilah used mostly for football matches and is the home ground of SCM Zalău or marathons.The stadium was renovated between 2017 and 2018, period in which the second stand (a metallic one) was demolished.The stadium is the only major stadium in Zalău(Zilah)and is the biggest in Sălaj county. Currently the ground holds 3,500 people in its main stand (approx. 1,000 on seats, 1,500 on benches and 1,000 on standing terrace).

In the past, Municipal Stadium was the home ground of Armătura Zalău and FC Zalău.
