= Michael Klein Stadium (1960) =

Romanian stadium

Stadionul “Corvinul 1921” Hunedoara
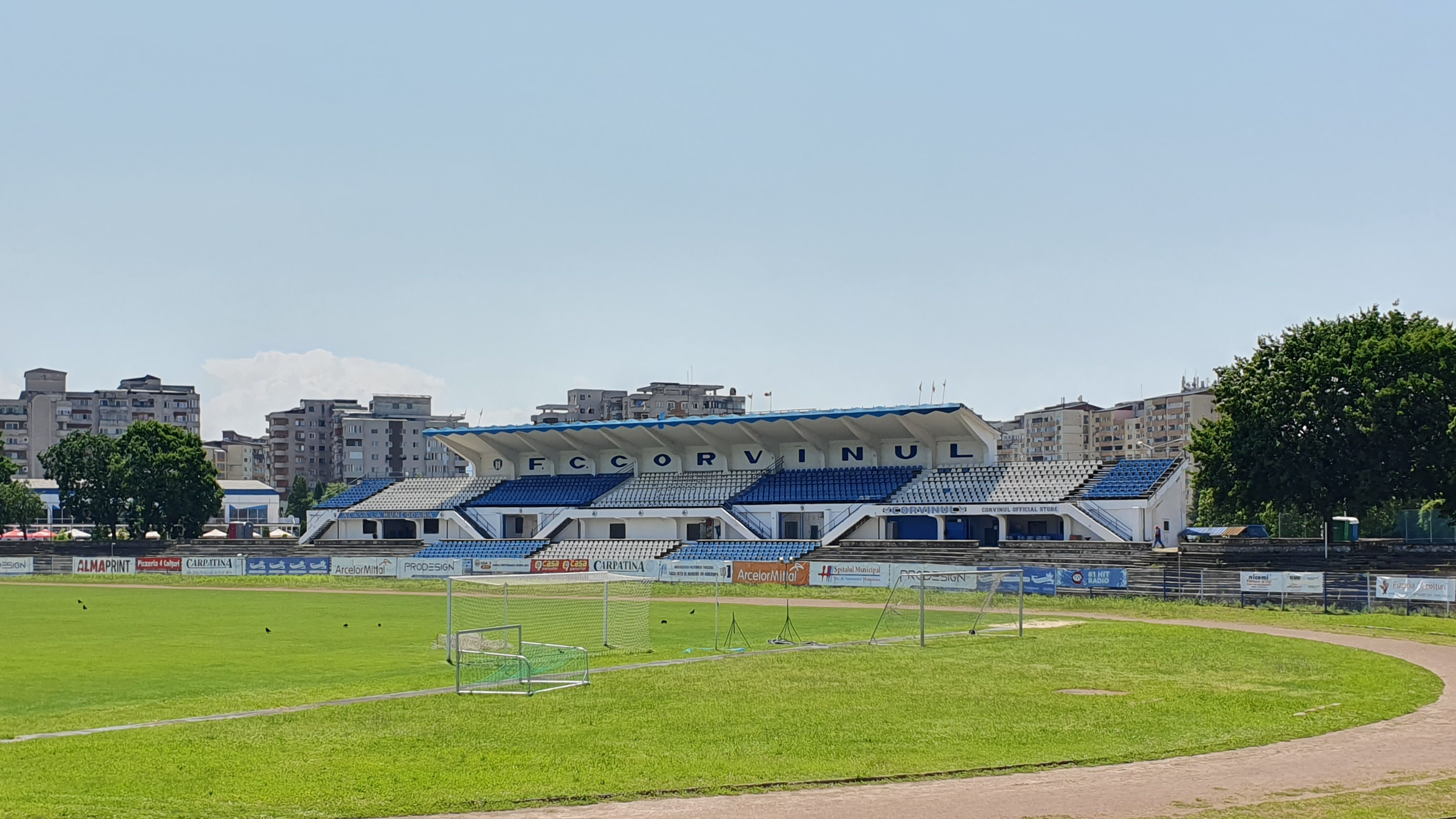
- The stadium in 2024
- Interactive map of Stadionul “Corvinul 1921” Hunedoara
- Former names: Corvinul Stadium, Michael Klein
- Address: Str. Mihai Viteazu, nr. 10
- Location: Hunedoara, Romania
- Coordinates: 45°45′41.9″N 22°54′46.7″E
- Owner: Municipality of Hunedoara
- Operator: Corvinul Hunedoara
- Capacity: 16,500 (3,000 seated)
- Surface: Grass

Construction
- Opened: 1960
- Renovated: 2009

Tenant
- Corvinul Hunedoara (1960–present)

The Complex Sportiv Corvinul was a multi-use stadium in Hunedoara, Romania. It was mostly used for football matches and is the home ground of Corvinul Hunedoara. The stadium holds 16,500 people. Opened in 1960 the stadium was the home ground of Corvinul Hunedoara for 44 years, until the dissolution of "The Ravens". The old stadium is currently being demolished to make way for a new modern arena.

Between 2011 and 2024 the stadium was named after Michael Klein, the Romanian international footballer who died on the pitch in 1993, while playing for Bayer Uerdingen. In 2024 the stadium was renamed as Stadionul “Corvinul 1921” Hunedoara, this was due to disputes over the trademark name of Michael Klein.

It is the 16th stadium in the country by capacity.
