= CS Crișul Chișineu-Criș =

Romanian football club

Crișul Chișineu-Criș
- Full name: Clubul Sportiv Crișul; Chișineu-Criș
- Nicknames: Chișăuanii (The People from Chișineu-Criș); Alb-Albaștrii (The White and Blues)
- Short name: Crișul
- Founded: 1954; 72 years ago as Strungul Chișineu Criș
- Ground: Crișul
- Capacity: 2,000
- Owner: Chișineu-Criș Town
- Chairman: Sebastian Mann
- 2022–23: Liga III, Seria VIII, 4th (withdrew)
Home colours	Away colours	Third colours

Clubul Sportiv Crișul Chișineu-Criș, commonly known as Crișul Chișineu-Criș, or simply Crișul Chișineu, is a Romanian professional football club based in Chișineu-Criș, Arad County. Crișul played in Liga III for twelve years, between 1985–1992 and 2018–2023. The most important result was a 2nd place, achieved at the end of the 2020–21 season qualifying for promotion play-off, but lost in the first round to Viitorul Șelimbăr, 2–4 on aggregate.

In the summer of 2023, the club withdrew from third tier of the Romanian football because of some financial problems.

== History ==
Crișul Chișineu-Criș was founded in 1954 as Strungul Chișineu-Criș and played in the regional and county championships for thirty-one years.

In the 1984–85 season, Strungul won the Arad County Championship and promoted to Divizia C beating 3–2 on aggregate Auto Timișoara, the winner of Timiș County Championship. Followed seven years in the third tier where it had the following results: 1985–86 – 7th, 1986–87 – 13th, 1987–88 – 5th, 1988–89 – 7th, 1989–90 – 9th, 1990–91 – 15th and 1991–92 – 13th.

After 1992 Strungul played only in the Liga IV – Arad County, the fourth tier of the Romanian football league system, and subsequently changed its name in Crișul Chișineu-Criș.

In the second half of the 2012–13 season Crișul started a collaboration with Europa Alba Iulia, but the alliance did not last and in the summer of 2013 chișăuanii enrolled again in the Liga IV.

After some seasons in which the team failed to promote, the white and blues won Liga IV, Arad County series, at the end of the 2017–18 season, then the promotion play-off against Petrolul Bustuchin, Gorj County champions and promoting back to Liga III after 27 years of absence.

== Ground ==
=== Stadionul Crișul ===
The club plays its home matches on Crișul Stadium from Chișineu-Criș, with a capacity of 2,000. Between 2012 and 2014 the stadium was renovated and upgraded, now having a new covered stand with 500 places on seats.

== Honours ==
Liga III

- Runners-up (1): 2020–21

Liga IV – Arad County

- Winners (2): 1984–85, 2017–18
- Runners-up (3): 2011–12, 2014–15, 2016–17

Cupa României – Arad County

- Runners-up (2): 2015–16, 2017–18

== League history ==
Season	Tier	Division	Place	Notes	Cupa României
2022–23	3	Liga III (Seria VIII)	4th	Withdrew	
2021–22	3	Liga III (Seria VIII)	4th		
2020–21	3	Liga III (Seria VIII)	2nd		
2019–20	3	Liga III (Seria IV)	3rd		
2018–19	3	Liga III (Seria IV)	7th		
2017–18	4	Liga IV (AR)	1st (C)	Promoted	
2016–17	4	Liga IV (AR)	2nd		
2015–16	4	Liga IV (AR)	3rd		
2014–15	4	Liga IV (AR)	2nd		
2013–14	4	Liga IV (AR)	4th		
2012–13	4	Liga IV (AR)	9th		
2011–12	4	Liga IV (AR)	2nd		

Season	Tier	Division	Place	Notes	Cupa României
2010–11	4	Liga IV (AR)	13th		
2009–10	4	Liga IV (AR)	16th		
2008–09	4	Liga IV (AR)	7th		
1991–92	3	Divizia C (Seria X)	13th	Relegated	
1990–91	3	Divizia C (Seria XII)	15th		
1989–90	3	Divizia C (Seria X)	9th		
1988–89	3	Divizia C (Seria VIII)	7th		
1987–88	3	Divizia C (Seria VIII)	5th		
1986–87	3	Divizia C (Seria VIII)	13th		
1985–86	3	Divizia C (Seria VIII)	7th		
1984–85	4	Divizia D (AR) (Seria B)	1st (C)	Promoted	
1983–84	4	Divizia D (AR) (Seria B)	1st (C)		

== Former managers ==
- (Romania) Zsolt Muzsnay (2017)
