= Cernavodă =

- Town
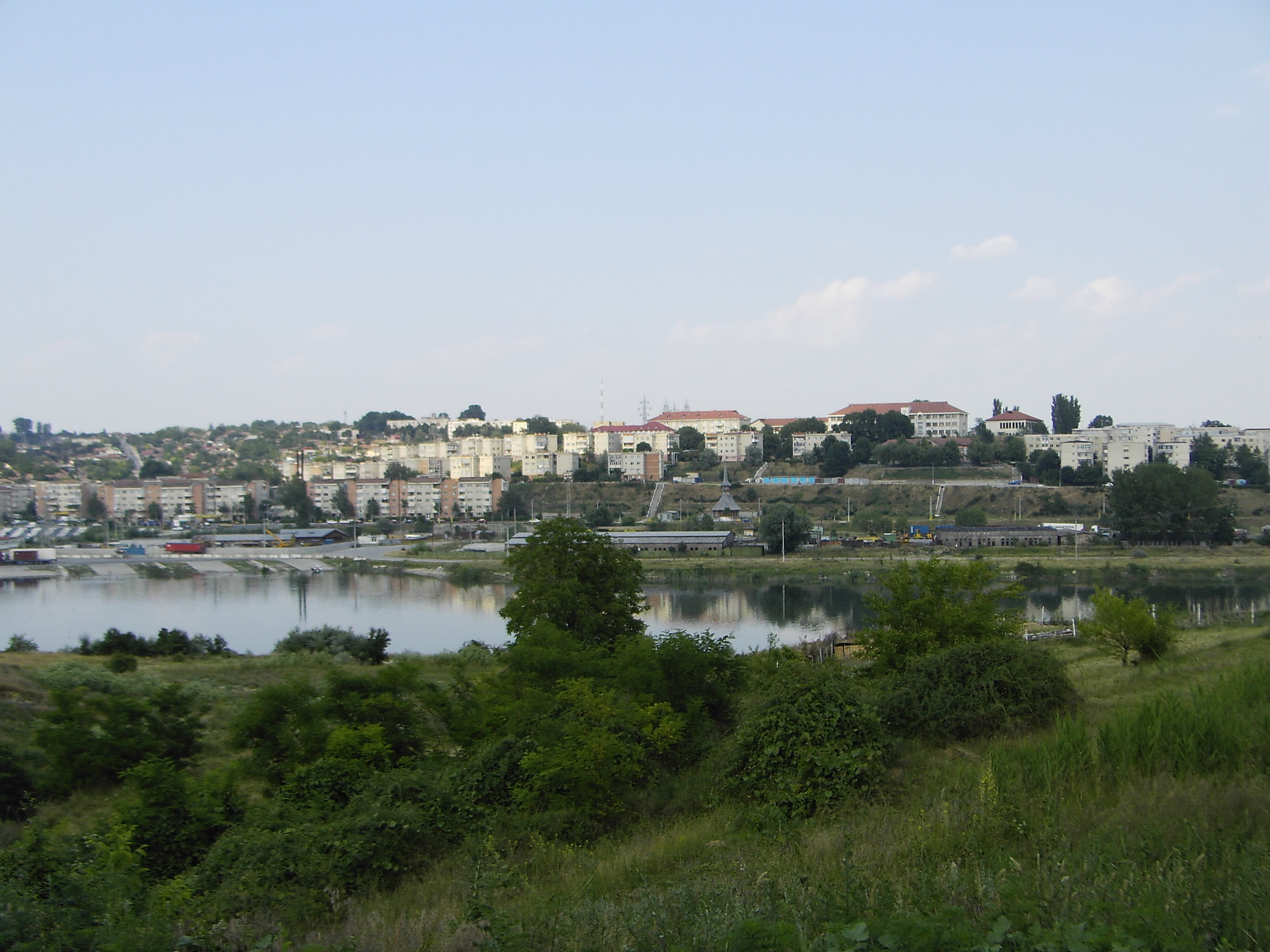
- Cernavodă and the Danube-Black Sea Canal

- Coat of arms

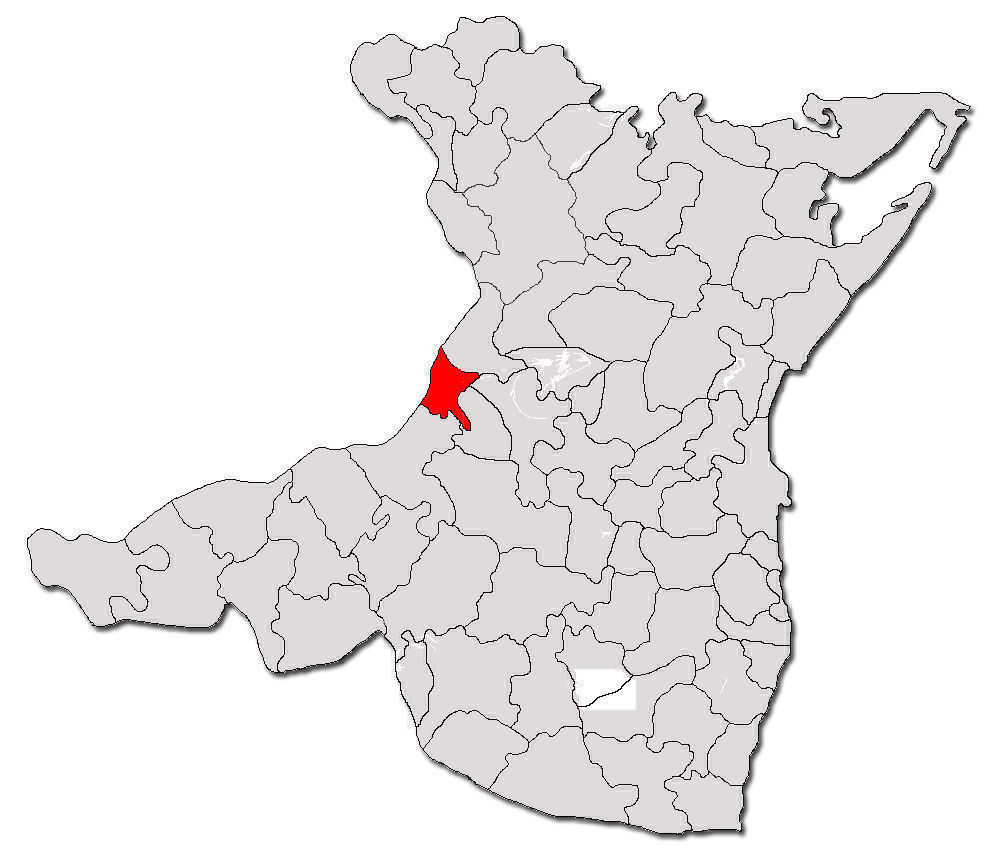
- Location in Constanța County

- Location in Romania
- Coordinates: 44°20′17″N 28°02′01″E
- Country: Romania
- County: Constanța

Government
  - Mayor (2024–2028): Liviu Negoiță (PNL)
- Area: 46.69 km^{2} (18.03 sq mi)
- Elevation: 50 m (160 ft)
- Population (2021-12-01): 15,088
  - Density: 323.2/km^{2} (837.0/sq mi)
- Time zone: UTC+02:00 (EET)
  - Summer (DST): UTC+03:00 (EEST)
- Postal code: 905200
- Vehicle reg.: CT
- Website: www.primaria-cernavoda.ro

Cernavodă (Romanian pronunciation: [t͡ʃernaˈvodə]) is a town in Constanța County, Northern Dobruja, Romania with a population of 15,088 as of 2021.

The town's name is derived from the Bulgarian cherna voda (черна вода in Cyrillic), meaning 'black water'. This name is regarded by some scholars as a calque of the earlier Thracian name Axíopa, from IE *n̥ksei 'dark' and upā 'water' (cf. Avestan axšaēna- 'dark' and Lithuanian ùpė 'river, creek').

== Economy ==
The town is a Danube fluvial port. It houses the Cernavodă Nuclear Power Plant, consisting of two CANDU reactors providing about 18% of Romania's electrical energy output. The second reactor was built through a joint venture between Canada's Atomic Energy of Canada Limited and Italy's ANSALDO and became fully functional in November 2007.

The Danube–Black Sea Canal, opened in 1984, runs from Cernavodă to Agigea and Năvodari.

The outskirts of Cernavodă host numerous vineyards, producers of Chardonnay wine. The largest winery in the area is Murfatlar.

== History ==
Cernavodă was founded under the name Axiopolis by the ancient Greeks in the 4th century BC as a trading post for contacts with local Dacians. A Roman fort was built as part of the defensive frontier system of the Moesian Limes along the Danube.

The railroad from Constanța to Cernavodă was opened in 1860 by the Ottoman administration.

Cernavodă was one of the capitals of the short-lived Silistra Nouă County (1878–1879).

The town gives its name to the late copper age Cernavodă archaeological culture, ca. 4000–3200 BC.

== Demographics ==
Historical population
Year	Pop.	±%
1912	5,743	—
1930	6,744	+17.4%
1948	6,100	−9.5%
1956	8,802	+44.3%
1966	11,259	+27.9%
1977	13,608	+20.9%
1992	22,043	+62.0%
2002	20,514	−6.9%
2011	16,129	−21.4%
2021	15,088	−6.5%
Source: Census data

At the 2021 census Cernavodă had a population of 15,088 with a majority of Romanians (80.4%) and minorities of Turks (2.23%), Roma (0.66%), Lipovans (0.47%), Tatars (0.15%), Hungarians (0.05%), Bulgarians (0.02%), others (0.7%) and unknown (15.32%).

At the 2011 census Cernavodă had 16,129 inhabitants; of those, 14,969 were Romanians (92.81%), 463 Turks (2.87%), 374 Roma (2.32%), 106 Lipovans (0.66%), 40 Tatars (0.25%), 15 Hungarians (0.09%), and 162 others.

== Climate ==
Climate data for Cernavodă (2014–2026 normals, extremes 1981–present)
Month	Jan	Feb	Mar	Apr	May	Jun	Jul	Aug	Sep	Oct	Nov	Dec	Year
Record high °C (°F)	20.0 (68.0)	23.5 (74.3)	30.1 (86.2)	32.7 (90.9)	38.4 (101.1)	38.8 (101.8)	43.0 (109.4)	42.2 (108.0)	36.3 (97.3)	33.1 (91.6)	26.9 (80.4)	20.4 (68.7)	43.0 (109.4)
Mean daily maximum °C (°F)	5.4 (41.7)	8.0 (46.4)	12.9 (55.2)	18.1 (64.6)	23.4 (74.1)	29.2 (84.6)	32.1 (89.8)	32.2 (90.0)	26.8 (80.2)	19.3 (66.7)	12.3 (54.1)	7.1 (44.8)	18.9 (66.0)
Daily mean °C (°F)	2.0 (35.6)	4.2 (39.6)	7.9 (46.2)	12.3 (54.1)	17.5 (63.5)	22.9 (73.2)	25.3 (77.5)	25.4 (77.7)	20.6 (69.1)	14.2 (57.6)	8.6 (47.5)	4.0 (39.2)	13.7 (56.7)
Mean daily minimum °C (°F)	−1.5 (29.3)	0.3 (32.5)	3.0 (37.4)	6.5 (43.7)	11.5 (52.7)	16.6 (61.9)	18.6 (65.5)	18.5 (65.3)	14.4 (57.9)	9.1 (48.4)	4.9 (40.8)	0.9 (33.6)	8.6 (47.4)
Record low °C (°F)	−19.7 (−3.5)	−24.6 (−12.3)	−14.0 (6.8)	−3.9 (25.0)	2.0 (35.6)	7.7 (45.9)	11.3 (52.3)	10.8 (51.4)	2.1 (35.8)	−5.2 (22.6)	−13.4 (7.9)	−17.6 (0.3)	−24.6 (−12.3)
Average precipitation mm (inches)	30.5 (1.20)	28.6 (1.13)	25.9 (1.02)	32.4 (1.28)	39.0 (1.54)	51.6 (2.03)	48.6 (1.91)	34.5 (1.36)	30.5 (1.20)	40.5 (1.59)	48.5 (1.91)	31.4 (1.24)	442 (17.41)
Average precipitation days (≥ 1.0 mm)	5.7	4.4	4.8	5.8	6.8	5.8	4.5	2.9	3.4	4.9	5.4	5.8	60.2
Average snowy days	5.3	3.4	1.8	0	0	0	0	0	0	0	1.2	2.4	14.1
Source: Meteomanz (2014-2026); Infoclimat (1980-2010); ANM

== Natives ==
- Iulian Carabela (born 1996), footballer
- Alexandru Dimca (born 1953), mathematician
- Alexandru Claudian (1898–1962), sociologist, political figure, and poet
- Iosipos Moisiodax (1725–1800), philosopher, deacon, and educator

== See also ==
- Cernavodă Nuclear Power Plant
- Anghel Saligny Bridge
- CS Axiopolis Cernavodă
