= 2021–22 FCV Farul Constanța season =

Football season in Romania Liga I

Farul Constanța
2021–22 season
- President: Gheorghe Popescu
- Manager: Gheorghe Hagi
- Stadium: Stadionul Viitorul (Ovidiu)
Home colours	Away colours	Third colours

The 2021–22 season is the 33rd professional football season in Farul Constanța's existence, and the 19th in the top-flight of Romanian football. Farul competes in Liga I and in the Cupa României.On 21 June 2021, Gheorghe Hagi (owner and founder of Viitorul Constanța), Gheorghe Popescu (chairman of Viitorul) and Ciprian Marica (owner of Farul Constanța) announced in a press conference that their teams have merged. The club that would continue in the Liga I will be FCV ('V' from 'Viitorul') Farul. Farul will play in the Liga I on Viitorul's place and its home matches will be disputed on Viitorul Stadium, due to Farul Stadium advance state of degradation.

== Previous season positions ==
=== Viitorul Constanța ===
	Competition	Position
(Romania)	Liga I	10th
(Romania)	Cupa României	Round of 32

=== Farul Constanța ===
	Competition	Position
(Romania)	Liga II	7th
(Romania)	Cupa României	Round of 16

== Season overview ==
=== June ===
On 21 June 2021, Gheorghe Hagi, owner and founder of Viitorul Constanța, Gheorghe Popescu, chairman of Viitorul, and Ciprian Marica, owner of Farul Constanța, announced in a press conference that their teams have merged. The club that would continue in the Liga I will be FCV ('V' from 'Viitorul') Farul. Farul will play its home matches on the Viitorul Stadium, as the old Farul Stadium will be in a rebuilding process.

On 22 June 2021 the club announced that they signed the Romanian goalkeeper Marian Aioani.

On 24 June 2021 the club announced that they signed the Romanian defender Ionuț Larie. Since making his debut in the first division in 2006, Larie has amassed over 300 matches in the competition for FC Farul Constanța, FC Viitorul Constanța, CFR Cluj, FCSB and Gaz Metan Mediaș, among others. With CFR Cluj he won the Cupa României in 2016.On the dame day, the club announced that they signed the Romanian forward Adrian Petre.

=== July ===
On 1 July 2021 the club announced that they signed the Brazilian midfielder Romário Pires. Since making his debut in the first division in 2012, "Romică" Pires has amassed over 100 matches in the competition for Gloria Bistrița, Petrolul Ploiești, Astra Giurgiu and Hermannstadt. With Petrolul Ploiești he won the Cupa României in 2013. His honours also include the Israel State Cup with Maccabi Haifa.

On 5 July FC Farul Constanța and Dnipro-1 agreed to transfer Valentin Cojocaru to the Ukrainian club for a fee of €100,000.

On 7 July the club announced that they signed the Romanian midfielder Florin Purece.He began his senior career in 2009 with UTA Arad, he moved to Concordia Chiajna and went on to make a name for himself at Viitorul Constanța.With Viitorul Constanța he won the 2016–17 Liga I. In 2017, he signed with Hapoel Ra'anana in Israel. After three additional seasons in Poland playing for Termalica Nieciecza, he returned to his native country in 2020. Purece signed a season-long deal at Sepsi OSK Sfântu Gheorghe.

On 9 July the club announced that they signed the Spanish forward Jefté Betancor. In last season he was the top-scorer of FC Voluntari.

On 10 July George Ganea scored for Romania in a friendly match against Saudi Arabia.

On 18 July Farul drew 0–0 away against UTA Arad.

On 25 July the club won the match against Gaz Metan Mediaș 2-0. Jefté Betancor and Adrian Petre scored for Viitorul.

On 26 July the club announced that they signed the Romanian goalkeeper Laurențiu Brănescu.Born in Râmnicu Vâlcea, Romania, Brănescu began his career with the youth academy of local side CSM Râmnicu Vâlcea in 2000. He remained within the club's youth sector until January 2011, when he caught the attention of Serie A side, Juventus Football Club. Brănescu originally was scouted by the Turin-based club during the summer of 2010, but did not officially complete his transfer to Italy until 24 January 2011. On 24 January 2011, Brănescu officially transferred from Râmnicu Vâlcea to Juventus Upon joining the Turin-based club, Brănescu was instantaneously inserted into the club's youth sector, where he quickly established himself as the club's first choice goalkeeper. Along with his regularity in the youth academy, Brănescu also served as Juventus' fourth choice goalkeeper for the 2012-13 Serie A campaign, behind Gianluigi Buffon, Marco Storari and Rubinho, earning 6 first team call-ups during league play, and also was a part of the club's 2012–13 UEFA Champions League roster. He also played for S.S. Juve Stabia (Italy), Virtus Lanciano (Italy), Szombathelyi Haladás (Hungary), Omonia (Cyprus), Dinamo București (Romania), HNK Gorica (Croatia), Žalgiris Vilnius (Lithuania), Kilmarnock (Scotland) and Politehnica Iași (Romania). He signed a three years contract with Farul.

On 30 July Farul drew 0–0 away against FC Rapid București.

=== August ===
On 9 August the club won the match against Sepsi OSK Sfântu Gheorghe 1-0. Jefté Betancor scored for Farul.

On 13 August, the match against CFR Cluj was lost 1-0.

On 20 August the club won the match against FC Dinamo București 3-0. Jefté Betancor and George Ganea scored for Farul.

On 27 August Farul drew 0–0 away against FC U Craiova 1948.Adrian Petre and George Ganea scored for Farul.

=== September ===
On 13 September Farul won the match against FC Academica Clinceni 5-0. Jefté Betancor, Adrian Petre and Enes Sali scored for Farul. On 13 September that year, Sali became the youngest player to score in the Liga I at 15 years, six months and 21 days, after netting the last goal in a 5–0 defeat of Academica Clinceni.

On 18 September, the match against AFC Chindia Târgoviște was lost 2-0.

On 22 September, the match against Sepsi OSK Sfântu Gheorghe was lost 1-0.

On 26 September, Farul won the match against CS Mioveni 2-1. Betancor and Ciobanu scored for Farul.

=== October ===
On 3 October, the match against FC Voluntari was lost 1-0.

On 13 October, FC Farul Constanța appointed Radu Paligora as the new doctor of the team. Radu Paligora was doctor at teams such as FCSB, Al Hilal SFC, Ludogorets Razgrad, Al-Wasl F.C. and CFR Cluj.

On 17 October, the match against FC Argeș Pitești was lost 2-1. Jefté Betancor scored for Farul.

On 29 October, the match against FC Botoșani was won 2-0. Damien Dussaut and Adrian Petre scored for Farul.

=== November ===
On 4 November, the match against FCSB was lost 1-0.

On 3 November 2021, aged 15, Sali was selected by the Romania national team for the 2022 FIFA World Cup qualifiers against Iceland and Liechtenstein. Romanian newspaper Gazeta Sporturilor later reported that Canada had also approached him for a possible call up.

Sali made his senior debut on 14 November by coming on as an 82nd minute substitute for Andrei Ivan in the latter match, and became the youngest European player to appear in a competitive game at 15 years and 264 days (Lucas Knecht holds the record for any player in any match type).

On 7 November, the match against CS Universitatea Craiova was won 1-0. Adrian Petre scored for Farul.

== Club officials ==
=== Board of directors ===
Role	Name
Owners	(Romania) Gheorghe Hagi (Romania) Ciprian Marica (Romania) Zoltán Iasko
President	(Romania) Gheorghe Popescu
Vice-President	(Romania) Tiberiu Curt
General Director	(Romania) Cristian Bivolaru
Executive Director	(Romania) Cristiana Pariza
Sporting director	(Romania) Zoltán Iasko
Economic Director	(Romania) Gheorghe Mega
Marketing Director	(Romania) Călin Clej
Judicial Department	(Romania) Florin Comșa
Youth Center Manager	(Romania) Cristian Cămui
Methodology and Evaluation Director	(Italy) Massimo Pedrazzini
Organizer of Competitions	(Romania) Constantin Stamate
Sports Center Administrator	(Romania) Decebal Curumi
Team Manager	(Romania) Costin Mega
Press Officer	(Romania) Sorin Teodoreanu

- Last updated: 1 July 2021
- Source: Board of directors (Hagi Academy)
- Source: Board of directors (Viitorul)

=== Current technical staff ===
Role	Name
Head coach	(Romania) Gheorghe Hagi
Assistant coaches	(Romania) Cătălin Anghel (Romania) Constantin Fălină (Romania) Cristian Sava
Goalkeeping coach	(Romania) Ștefan Preda
Fitness coach	(Romania) Ștefan Anghel
Club Doctor	(Romania) Radu Paligora
Nutritionist	(Romania) Cristian Mărgărit
Physiotherapist	(Romania) Paul Ciocănescu
Kinetotherapist	(Romania) Denis Răilean
Masseurs	(Romania) Daniel Stoian (Romania) Cosmin Ghiorghe
Storeman	(Romania) Ștefan Pețu (Romania) Alexandru Căscătău

- Last updated: 1 July 2021
- Source: Medical staff Archived 11 July 2019 at the Wayback Machine
- Source: Press release

== Players ==
=== Current squad ===
No.	Name	Nationality	Position	Date of birth (age)	Signed from	Signed in
Goalkeepers
12	Mihai Aioani	(Romania)	GK	7 November 1999 (age 26)	Chindia Târgoviște	2021
31	Cosmin Dur-Bozoancă	(Romania)	GK	15 February 1998 (age 27)	Academy	2013
34	Ștefan Mușat	(Romania)	GK	17 January 2001 (age 25)	Academy	2016
94	Laurențiu Brănescu	(Romania)	GK	30 March 1994 (age 31)	FC Politehnica Iași	2021
Defenders
3	Gabriel Buta	(Romania)	DF	29 January 2002 (age 24)	Academy	2019
4	Damien Dussaut	(France)	DF	8 November 1994 (age 31)	FC Dinamo București	2019
5	Sebastian Mladen (2nd C)	(Romania)	DF	11 December 1991 (age 34)	F.C. Südtirol	2017
6	Bradley de Nooijer	(Netherlands)	DF	7 November 1997 (age 28)	FC Dordrecht	2017
14	Daniel Bîrzu	(Romania)	DF	28 May 2002 (age 23)	Academy	2009
15	Gabriel Dănuleasa	(Romania)	DF	8 May 2003 (age 22)	Academy	2010
16	Vlad Chera	(Romania)	DF	6 June 2000 (age 25)	CNP Timişoara	2018
17	Ionuț Larie (C)	(Romania)	DF	16 January 1987 (age 39)	Gaz Metan Mediaș	2021
26	Bogdan Lazăr	(Romania)	DF	26 June 2003 (age 22)	Academy	2012
21	Alin Dobrosavlevici	(Romania)	DF	24 October 1994 (age 31)	Hermannstadt	2020
23	Virgil Ghiță	(Romania)	DF	4 June 1998 (age 27)	Academy	2011
77	Radu Boboc	(Romania)	DF	24 July 1999 (age 26)	Academy	2013
97	Alexandru Georgescu	(Romania)	DF	10 July 2001 (age 24)	Academy	2010
Midfielders
8	Carlo Casap	(Romania)	MF	29 December 1998 (age 27)	Academy	2017
17	Andrei Ciobanu	(Romania)	MF	18 January 1998 (age 28)	Academy	2010
18	Andrei Artean (3rd C)	(Romania)	MF	14 August 1993 (age 32)	ACS Poli Timișoara	2018
20	Roberto Mălăele	(Romania)	MF	29 March 2003 (age 22)	Academy	2016
24	Constantin Grameni	(Romania)	MF	18 January 2002 (age 24)	Academy	2019
27	Ely Fernandes	(Cape Verde)	FW / MF	4 November 1990 (age 35)	Gaz Metan Mediaș	2020
29	Eduard Rădăslăvescu	(Romania)	MF	30 July 2004 (age 21)	Academy	2012
30	Florin Purece	(Romania)	MF	6 November 1991 (age 34)	Sepsi Sfântu Gheorghe	2021
32	Romário Pires	(Brazil)	MF	16 January 1989 (age 37)	Hermannstadt	2021
66	Josemi Castañeda	(Spain)	MF	26 February 1998 (age 27)	Las Palmas Atlético	2020
98	Nicolas Popescu	(Romania)	MF	2 January 2003 (age 23)	Academy	2018
99	Ștefan Bodișteanu	(Romania) (Moldova)	MF	1 February 2003 (age 23)	Academy	2015
Forwards
7	George Ganea	(Romania)	FW	26 May 1999 (age 26)	CFR Cluj	2019
9	Adrian Petre	(Romania)	FW	11 February 1998 (age 27)	UTA Arad	2021
10	Jefté Betancor	(Spain)	FW	6 July 1993 (age 32)	FC Voluntari	2021
22	Luca Andronache	(Romania)	FW	26 July 2003 (age 22)	FCSB II	2019
25	Aurelian Chițu	(Romania)	FW	25 March 1991 (age 34)	Daejeon Hana Citizen FC	2020
28	Enes Sali	(Romania) (Canada)	FW	23 January 2006 (age 20)	Academy	2018
80	Alexi Pitu	(Romania)	FW	5 June 2002 (age 23)	Academy	2010

=== Transfers ===
==== Players from Farul ====
Name	Nationality	Position	Date of birth (age)	Signed in
Cosmin Dur-Bozoancă	(Romania)	GK	15 February 1998 (age 27)	2020

==== Players from Viitorul ====
Name	Nationality	Position	Date of birth (age)	Signed in
Damien Dussaut	(France)	DF	8 November 1994 (age 31)	2019
Sebastian Mladen	(Romania)	DF	11 December 1991 (age 34)	2017
Alexandru Georgescu	(Romania)	DF	10 July 2001 (age 24)	2010
Alin Dobrosavlevici	(Romania)	DF	24 October 1994 (age 31)	2020
Virgil Ghiță	(Romania)	DF	4 June 1998 (age 27)	2011
Gabriel Buta	(Romania)	DF	29 January 2002 (age 24)	2019
Radu Boboc	(Romania)	DF	24 July 1999 (age 26)	2013
Carlo Casap	(Romania)	MF	29 December 1998 (age 27)	2017
Roberto Mălăele	(Romania)	MF	29 March 2003 (age 22)	2016
Andrei Ciobanu	(Romania)	MF	18 January 1998 (age 28)	2010
Andrei Artean	(Romania)	MF	14 August 1993 (age 32)	2018
Constantin Grameni	(Romania)	MF	18 January 2002 (age 24)	2019
Ely Fernandes	(Cape Verde)	FW / MF	4 November 1990 (age 35)	2020
Nicolas Popescu	(Romania)	MF	2 January 2003 (age 23)	2018
Josemi Castañeda	(Spain)	MF	26 February 1998 (age 27)	2020
Ștefan Bodișteanu	(Romania) (Moldova)	MF	1 February 2003 (age 23)	2015
George Ganea	(Romania)	FW	26 May 1999 (age 26)	2019
Aurelian Chițu	(Romania)	FW	25 March 1991 (age 34)	2020
Luca Andronache	(Romania)	FW	26 July 2003 (age 22)	2019
Alexi Pitu	(Romania)	FW	5 June 2002 (age 23)	2010

==== In ====
Date	Pos.	Player	Age	Moving from	Fee	Notes	Source
Summer
21 June 2021	GK	(Romania) Ștefan Mușat	20	(Romania) CSA Steaua București	Free	loan return	
21 June 2021	GK	(Romania) Árpád Tordai	24	(Hungary) MOL Fehérvár	Free	loan return	
22 June 2021	GK	(Romania) Mihai Aioani	21	(Romania) Chindia Târgoviște	Free		
24 June 2021	DF	(Romania) Ionuț Larie	34	(Romania) Gaz Metan Mediaș	Free		
24 June 2021	FW	(Romania) Adrian Petre	23	(Romania) UTA Arad	Free		
26 June 2021	DF	(Netherlands) Bradley de Nooijer	23	(Ukraine) Vorskla Poltava	Free	loan return	
1 July 2021	MF	(Brazil) Romário Pires	32	(Romania) Hermannstadt	Free		
7 July 2021	MF	(Romania) Florin Purece	29	(Romania) Sepsi Sfântu Gheorghe	Free		
9 July 2021	FW	(Spain) Jefté Betancor	28	(Romania) FC Voluntari	Free		
20 July 2021	DF	(Romania) Vlad Chera	21	(Romania) CSM Reșița	Free	loan return	
26 July 2021	GK	(Romania) Laurențiu Brănescu	27	(Romania) FC Politehnica Iași	Free		

==== Out ====
No.	Pos.	Nation	Player
10	MF	MKD	David Babunski (to (Hungary) Debreceni VSC)
6	DF	ROU	Romario Benzar (loan return to (Italy) U.S. Lecce)
3	DF	BRA	Marquinhos Pedroso (to (Latvia) FK Liepāja)
11	FW	BRA	Jô Santos (to (Bahrain) Riffa SC)
34	GK	ROU	Cătălin Căbuz (to (Romania) Chindia Târgoviște)
-	MF	ROU	Marco Dulca (to (Romania) Chindia Târgoviște)
-	DF	ROU	Paul Iacob (to (Romania) Chindia Târgoviște)
-	DF	ROU	Tiberiu Căpușă (to (Romania) Chindia Târgoviște)
19	FW	CGO	Juvhel Tsoumou (to (Morocco) Wydad Casablanca)
30	MF	ROU	Răzvan Grădinaru (to (Romania) Gaz Metan Mediaș)
28	MF	ESP	Jon Gaztañaga (to (Spain) Cultural Leonesa)
13	MF	ROU	Cosmin Matei (to (Romania) FC Dinamo București)
12	GK	ROU	Valentin Cojocaru (to (Ukraine) Dnipro-1)
1	GK	ROU	Árpád Tordai (to (Hungary) Mezőkövesdi)

No.	Pos.	Nation	Player
4	DF	ROU	Vlad Gîsă (to (Romania) Unirea Constanța)
5	MF	MDA	Ion Cărăruș (to (Romania) Unirea Constanța)
7	MF	ROU	Florin Bălan (loan return to (Romania) FC Voluntari)
8	MF	ROU	Paul Antoche ( (Romania) FC Hermannstadt)
9	FW	ROU	Andrei Banyoi (to (Romania) Unirea Constanța)
10	MF	ROU	Alexandru Stoica (to (Romania) Dunărea Călărași)
11	FW	MDA	Ilie Damașcan (to (Romania) Unirea Constanța)
14	DF	ROU	Robert Băjan (to (Romania) Unirea Constanța)
16	DF	ROU	Ionuț Ursu (to (Romania) Unirea Constanța)
17	FW	ROU	Simon Măzărache (to (Romania) Petrolul Ploiești)
18	FW	ROU	Cezar Gherghiceanu (to (Romania) CSA Steaua București)
20	FW	ROU	Vlad Rusu (to (Romania) Viitorul Pandurii Târgu Jiu)
21	GK	ROU	Ștefan Fara (loan return to (Romania) Dinamo București)
22	DF	ROU	Iulian Carabela (to (Romania) Unirea Constanța)
23	MF	ROU	Antonio Cruceru (to (Romania) Unirea Slobozia)
24	DF	ROU	Marius Savu (loan return to (Romania) Star Sport)
27	MF	ROU	Ionuț Pelivan (to (Romania) FC Politehnica Iași)
30	MF	ROU	Liviu Mihai (to (Romania) Unirea Constanța)
33	MF	ROU	Robert Silaghi (loan return to (Romania) CFR Cluj)
45	MF	ROU	Ștefan Rus (to (Romania) Unirea Constanța)
77	MF	ROU	Cosmin Bîrnoi (to (Romania) ASU Politehnica Timișoara)
95	MF	ROU	Răzvan Greu (to (Romania) Unirea Slobozia)
97	DF	ROU	Dan Panait (to (Romania) FC Brașov)
98	MF	ROU	Darius Ciolacu (to (Romania) Unirea Constanța)
-	MF	ROU	Daniel Nicula (to (Romania) Unirea Constanța)
12	GK	MDA	Sebastian Agachi (to (Moldova) FC Bălți)

==== Loans out ====
No.	Pos.	Nation	Player
-	MF	ROU	Florian Haită (on loan to (Romania) FC Universitatea Cluj)
-	MF	ROU	Răzvan Matiș (on loan to (Romania) Chindia Târgoviște)
-	FW	ROU	Robert Mustacă (on loan to (Romania) Unirea Slobozia)
-	FW	ROU	Andrei Vîlea (on loan to (Romania) Ceahlăul Piatra Neamț)
-	DF	ROU	Antonio Vlad (on loan to (Romania) CS Hunedoara, previously on loan at CSA Steaua București)
-	FW	ROU	Alexandru Pop (on loan to (Romania) Unirea Dej, previously on loan at FC Universitatea Cluj)
-	MF	ROU	Cosmin Tucaliuc (on loan to (Romania) CS Mioveni, previously on loan at FC Buzău)
-	DF	ROU	Darius Mureșan (on loan to (Romania) Unirea Constanța, previously on loan at Aerostar Bacău)
-	DF	ROU	Marius Leca (on loan to (Romania) Unirea Constanța)
-	DF	ROU	Gabriel Nedelea (on loan to (Romania) ASC Oțelul Galați, previously on loan at FC Buzău)
-	MF	ROU	Alexandru Negrean (on loan to (Romania) FC Brașov, previously on loan at FC Universitatea Cluj)
-	MF	ROU	Răzvan Iorga (on loan to (Romania) FC Brașov)
-	DF	ROU	Claudiu Zamfirescu (on loan to (Romania) Metalul Buzău)
-	MF	ROU	Cosmin Tucaliuc (on loan to (Romania) Petrolul Ploiești, previously on loan at CS Mioveni)
-	DF	ROU	Darius Grosu (on loan to (Romania) Metaloglobus)
-	DF	ROU	Marius Leca (on loan to (Romania) FC Dunărea Călărași, previously on loan at Unirea Constanța)

== Friendly matches ==
Win Draw Loss

23 June 2021	Corona Brașov (Romania)	0-2	(Romania) Farul Constanța	Brașov, Romania
EEST (UTC+3)			Ely Fernandes 42'; Vlad Mihalcea 65'	Stadium: Metrom Stadium

26 June 2021	FC Rapid București (Romania)	1-1	(Romania) Farul Constanța	Brașov, Romania
EEST (UTC+3)	Antonio Sefer 6'		Carlo Casap 62' (pen.)	Stadium: Stadionul Silviu Ploeșteanu

30 June 2021	CS Mioveni (Romania)	0-1	(Romania) Farul Constanța	Brașov, Romania
EEST (UTC+3)			Andrei Artean 3'	Stadium: Stadionul Silviu Ploeșteanu

30 June 2021	Chindia Târgoviște (Romania)	2-1	(Romania) Farul Constanța	Ghimbav, Romania
EEST (UTC+3)	Tiberiu Căpușă 34'; Cristian Cherchez 77'		Adrian Petre 88' (pen.)	Stadium: Campo Verde

3 July 2021	Csíkszereda Miercurea Ciuc (Romania)	1-1	(Romania) Farul Constanța	Ghimbav, Romania
EEST (UTC+3)	Dávid Bor 57'		Luca Andronache 51'	Stadium: Campo Verde

3 July 2021	FC Petrolul Ploiești (Romania)	1-0	(Romania) Farul Constanța	Brașov, Romania
EEST (UTC+3)	Ilie David 75'			Stadium: Stadionul Silviu Ploeșteanu

10 July 2021	Farul Constanța (Romania)	3-2	(Romania) Dacia Unirea Brăila	Ovidiu, Romania
EEST (UTC+3)	Darius Grosu 59'; Ely Fernandes 74'; Gabriel Buta 90+2'		Raphael Stănescu 6' 61'	Stadium: Complexul Academiei Hagi

10 July 2021	Farul Constanța (Romania)	1-1	(Bulgaria) Cherno More Varna	Ovidiu, Romania
EEST (UTC+3)	Alexi Pitu 4'		Ilian Iliev Jr. 48'	Stadium: Stadionul Viitorul (Ovidiu)

23 July 2021	Farul Constanța (Romania)	4-0	(Romania) Dacia Unirea Brăila	Ovidiu, Romania
EEST (UTC+3)				Stadium: Complexul Academiei Hagi

5 September 2021	Galatasaray (Turkey)	1-3	(Romania) Farul Constanța	Istanbul, Turkey
11:00 CEST	Alin Dobrosavlevici 29' (o.g.)		Jefté Betancor 81'; Ely Fernandes 84'; George Ganea 90' (pen.)

8 October 2021	Farul Constanța (Romania)	2-0	(Romania) Unirea Slobozia	Ovidiu, Romania
EEST (UTC+3)	Enes Sali 32'; Carlo Casap 38'			Stadium: Stadionul Viitorul (Ovidiu)

== Competitions ==
Win Draw Loss

=== Liga I ===
==== Regular season ====
===== Table =====
Pos	Team	Pld	W	D	L	GF	GA	GD	Pts	Qualification
3	Universitatea Craiova	30	16	6	8	55	29	+26	54	Qualification for the Play-off round
4	Argeș Pitești	30	14	6	10	28	22	+6	48	Qualification for the Play-off round
5	Farul Constanța	30	14	6	10	42	21	+21	48	Qualification for the Play-off round
6	Voluntari	30	13	8	9	31	27	+4	47	Qualification for the Play-off round
7	Botoșani	30	11	13	6	33	28	+5	46	Qualification for the Play-out round

Source: LPF (in Romanian) Soccerway
Rules for classification: 1) Points; 2) Head-to-head points; 3) Head-to-head goal difference; 4) Head-to-head goals scored; 5) Goal difference; 6) Goals scored; 7) Play-off.

===== Results by round =====
Round	1	2	3	4	5	6	7	8	9	10	11	12	13	14	15
Ground	A	H	A	H	A	H	A	H	A	H	A	A	H	A	H
Result	D	W	D	W	L	W	D	W	L	W	L	L	L	W	W
Position	7	7	6	5	5	5	5	4	5	3	6	8	8	8	7

Updated to match(es) played on 2021. Source: Liga I
A = Away; H = Home; W = Win; D = Draw; L = Loss

==== Matches ====
19 July 2021 1	UTA Arad	0-0	Farul Constanța	Arad
18:30 EEST (UTC+3)	Roger (yellow card) 80'		Sebastian Mladen (yellow card) 45'; Bradley de Nooijer (yellow card) 70'; Damien Dussaut (yellow card) 28' (yellow-red card) 70'	Stadium: Stadionul Francisc von Neuman; Referee: Marcel Bîrsan (Bucharest), Sebastian Gheorghe (Suceava) and Andrei Constantinescu (Bucharest)

25 July 2021 2	Farul Constanța	2-0	Gaz Metan Mediaș	Ovidiu
18:30 EEST (UTC+3)	Jefté Betancor 55' (pen.); Adrian Petre 80'; Romário Pires (yellow card) 18'; Alexandru Georgescu (yellow card) 57'; Alexi Pitu (yellow card) 75'; Alin Dobrosavlevici (yellow card) 78'		Ramon Gașpar (yellow card) 30'; Félix Mathaus (yellow card) 54'; Răzvan Trif (yellow card) 79'	Stadium: Viitorul; Referee: Marian Barbu (Făgăraș - Brașov), Vladimir Urzică (Piatra Neamț) and Imre Bucsi (Sf. Gheorghe - Covasna)

30 July 2021 3	Rapid București	0-0	Farul Constanța	Bucharest
21:30 EEST (UTC+3)	Júnior Morais (yellow card) 80'		Alin Dobrosavlevici (yellow card) 45+4'; Josemi Castañeda (yellow card) 56'	Stadium: Arena Națională; Referee: Ovidiu Hațegan (Arad), Radu Ghinguleac (Bucharest) and Sebastian Gheorghe (Suceava)

9 August 2021 4	Farul Constanța	1–0	Sepsi OSK Sfântu Gheorghe	Ovidiu
18:30 EEST (UTC+3)	Jefté Betancor 49'; Andrei Ciobanu (yellow card) 88'		Bogdan Mitrea (yellow card) 36'; Branislav Niňaj (yellow card) 77'	Stadium: Viitorul; Attendance: 0 Referee: Adrian Cojocaru (Galați), Marius Badea (Rm. Vâlcea) and Ferencz Tunyoki (Zalău)

13 August 2021 5	CFR Cluj	1-0	Farul Constanța	Cluj
21:30 EEST (UTC+3)	Gabriel Debeljuh 36'		Romário Pires (yellow card) 58'	Stadium: Stadionul Dr. Constantin Rădulescu; Attendance: 0 Referee: Sebastian Colțescu (Craiova), Radu Ghinguleac (Bucharest) and Daniel Mitruți (Craiova)

20 August 2021 6	Farul Constanța	3–0	FC Dinamo București	Ovidiu
21:30 EEST (UTC+3)	Betancor 12', 53'; De Nooijer (yellow card) 45+1'; Ganea 57'	Report	Filip (yellow card) 65'; Grigore (yellow card) 82'	Stadium: Stadionul Viitorul; Attendance: 3,400; Referee: George Cătălin Găman (Craiova)

28 August 2021 7	FC U Craiova 1948	1–1	Farul Constanța	Craiova
21:00 EEST (UTC+3)	Claudiu Bălan 48'; Benjamin Van Durmen (yellow card) 37'; Radu Negru (yellow card) 60'		Adrian Petre 83' (pen.); Sebastian Mladen (yellow card) 30'; Ionuț Larie (yellow card) 90+3'	Stadium: Stadionul Ion Oblemenco; Referee: Ionuț Coza (Cernica - Ilfov), Ferencz Tunyogi (Zalău - Sălaj) and Marius Badea (Rm. Vâlcea - Vâlcea)

13 September 2021 8	Farul Constanța	5–0	Academica Clinceni	Ovidiu
18:30 EEST (UTC+3)	Betancor 6', 45', 57'; Andrei Artean (yellow card) 24'; Adrian Petre 81'; Enes Sali 85'		Denis Ventúra (yellow card) 17'; Donatas Kazlauskas (yellow card) 70'	Stadium: Stadionul Viitorul; Referee: Cătălin Popa (Argeș - Pitești), George Neacșu (Câmpulung Muscel - Argeș) and Laszlo Bucsi (Sf. Gheorghe - Covasna)

18 September 2021 9	Chindia Târgoviște	2–0	Farul Constanța	Ploiești
14:00 EEST (UTC+3)	Daniel Popa 40' 84'; Paul Iacob (yellow card) 90+3'		Alin Dobrosavlevici 70'	Stadium: Ilie Oană Stadium; Referee: Andrei Chivulete (Bucharest), Vladimir Urzică (Piatra Neamț) and Andrei Constantinescu (Bucharest)

26 September 2021 10	Farul Constanța	2–1	CS Mioveni	Ovidiu
16:30 EEST (UTC+3)	Betancor 16'; Andrei Ciobanu 90+2'; Alexi Pitu 32'		Bogdan Rusu 86'; Lucian Dumitriu (yellow card) 19'; Ionuț Burnea (yellow card) 22'; Adrian Scarlatache (yellow card) 35'; Răzvan Ducan (yellow card) 90+1'	Stadium: Stadionul Viitorul; Referee: Sorin Costreie (Buftea - Ilfov), Sebastian Gheorghe (Suceava) and Alexandru Vodă (Alba-Iulia)

3 October 2021 11	FC Voluntari	1–0	Farul Constanța	Voluntari
16:30 EEST (UTC+3)	Ion Gheorghe 65'			Stadium: Stadionul Anghel Iordănescu; Referee: Cătălin Popa (Pitești - Argeș), Vladimir Urzică (Piatra Neamț) and Marius Marchidanu (Brăila)

17 October 2021 12	Argeș Pitești	2–1	Farul Constanța	Pitești
14:30 EEST (UTC+3)	Jafar Arias 50'; Diogo Viana 73'		Jefté Betancor 80' (pen.); Sebastian Mladen (yellow card) 35'	Stadium: Stadionul Nicolae Dobrin; Referee: Sebastian Colțescu (Craiova), Daniel Mitruți (Craiova) and Vlad Bârleanu (Bucharest)

4 November 2021 13	Farul Constanța	0–1	FCSB	Ovidiu
20:30 EEST (UTC+3)	Virgil Ghiță (yellow card) 71'		Constantin Grameni 13' (o.g.); Risto Radunović (yellow card) 45'	Stadium: Stadionul Viitorul; Referee: Ionuț Coza (Cernica - Ilfov), Valentin Dumitru (Gherghița - Prahova) and Ionuț Bobe (Videle - Teleorman)

29 October 2021 14	FC Botoșani	0–2	Farul Constanța	Botoșani
20:30 EEST (UTC+3)	Joyskim Dawa (yellow card) 15'; Mateus Santos (yellow card) 25'; Andrei Tîrcoveanu (yellow card) 48'		Damien Dussaut 23'; Adrian Petre 88' (pen.); Romário Pires (yellow card) 45'	Stadium: Stadionul Municipal (Botoșani); Referee: Istvan Kovacs (Satu Mare), Vasile Marinescu (Bucharest) and Ovidiu Artene (Vaslui)

7 November 2021 15	Farul Constanța	1–0	CS Universitatea Craiova	Ovidiu
17:30 EEST (UTC+3)	Adrian Petre 78'; George Ganea (yellow card) 57'; Bradley de Nooijer (yellow card) 90+3'		Alexandru Crețu (yellow card) 69'	Stadium: Stadionul Viitorul; Referee: Andrei Chivulete (Bucharest), Vladimir Urzică (Piatra Neamț) and Andrei Constantinescu (București)

=== Cupa României ===
==== Round of 32 ====
22 October 2021	Farul Constanța	0-1	Sepsi OSK Sfântu Gheorghe	Ovidiu
EEST (UTC+3)	Bogdan Mitrea 51' (pen.)			Stadium: Viitorul; Attendance: 0

== Statistics ==
=== Appearances and goals ===
No.	Pos	Player	Liga I		Cupa României		Total	
No.	Pos	Player	Apps	Goals	Apps	Goals	Apps	Goals
5	MF	(Romania) Sebastian Mladen	12	0	1	0	13	0
6	DF	(Netherlands) Bradley de Nooijer	14	0	0	0	14	0
20	MF	(Romania) Roberto Mălăele	1	0	0	0	1	0
17	DF	(Romania) Ionuț Larie	15	0	1	0	16	0
9	FW	(Romania) Adrian Petre	13	5	1	0	14	5
77	DF	(Romania) Darius Grosu	1	0	0	0	1	0
21	DF	(Romania) Alin Dobrosavlevici	7	0	1	0	8	0
25	FW	(Romania) Aurelian Chițu	10	0	1	0	11	0
30	MF	(Romania) Florin Purece	9	0	0	0	9	0
4	DF	(France) Damien Dussaut	13	0	1	0	14	0
52	MF	(Brazil) Romário Pires	11	0	1	0	12	0
15	DF	(Romania) Alexandru Georgescu	2	0	0	0	2	0
10	FW	(Spain) Jefté Betancor	15	9	1	0	16	9
66	MF	(Spain) Josemi Castañeda	2	0	0	0	2	0
24	MF	(Romania) Constantin Grameni	9	0	0	0	9	0
15	DF	(Romania) Gabriel Dănuleasa	1	0	0	0	1	0
3	DF	(Romania) Gabriel Buta	3	0	1	0	4	0
22	FW	(Romania) Luca Andronache	2	0	0	0	2	0
99	FW	(Romania) Ștefan Bodișteanu	2	0	1	0	3	0
80	FW	(Romania) Alexi Pitu	15	0	0	0	15	0
98	MF	(Romania) Nicolas Popescu	3	0	0	0	3	0
12	GK	(Romania) Marian Aioani	12	0	0	0	12	0
23	DF	(Romania) Virgil Ghiță	11	0	1	0	12	0
18	MF	(Romania) Andrei Artean	11	0	1	0	12	0
11	MF	(Romania) Andrei Ciobanu	11	1	0	0	11	1
28	MF	(Romania) Enes Sali	8	1	1	0	9	1
2	DF	(Romania) Radu Boboc	6	0	1	0	7	0
7	FW	(Romania) George Ganea	12	1	0	0	12	1
29	MF	(Romania) Eduard Rădăslăvescu	4	0	1	0	5	0
94	GK	(Romania) Laurențiu Brănescu	0	0	1	0	1	0
27	MF	(Cape Verde) Ely Fernandes	4	0	1	0	5	0
Players transferred out during the season
1	GK	(Romania) Árpád Tordai	3	0	0	0	3	0

=== Squad statistics ===
	Liga I	Cupa României
Games played	15	1
Games won	7	0
Games drawn	3	0
Games lost	5	1
Goals scored	18	0
Goals conceded	9	1
Goal difference	+9	-1
Clean sheets	8	0
Goal by Substitute	5	0
Total shots	128	–
Shots on target	50	–
Corners	71	–
Players used	25	16
Offsides	40	–
Fouls suffered	175	–
Fouls committed	211	–
Yellow cards	21	2
Red cards	1	0

=== Goalscorers ===
R	No.	Pos.	Nation	Name	Liga I	Cupa României	Total
1	10	FW	(Spain)	Jefté Betancor	9	0	9
2	9	FW	(Romania)	Adrian Petre	5	0	5
3	7	FW	(Romania)	George Ganea	1	0	1
3	28	FW	(Romania)	Enes Sali	1	0	1
3	11	MF	(Romania)	Andrei Ciobanu	1	0	1
3	4	DF	(France)	Damien Dussaut	1	0	1

=== Hat-tricks ===
Player	Against	Result	Date	Competition
(Spain) Jefté Betancor	Academica Clinceni	5–0 (H)	13 September 2021	Liga I

=== Clean sheets ===
Rank	Name	Liga I	Cupa României	Total	Games played
1	(Romania) Marian Aioani	5	0	0	12
2	(Romania) Árpád Tordai	3	0	0	3
3	(Romania) Laurențiu Brănescu	0	0	0	1
Total		6	0	0	13

=== Disciplinary record ===
As of 2021

Number	Position	Nation	Name	Liga I			Cupa României			Total		
Number	Position	Nation	Name	Booked	(yellow card) (yellow-red card)	Sent off (straight red)	Booked	(yellow card) (yellow-red card)	Sent off (straight red)	Booked	(yellow card) (yellow-red card)	Sent off (straight red)
4	DF	(France)	Damien Dussaut	1	0	1	0	0	0	1	1	0
5	DF	(Romania)	Sebastian Mladen	3	0	0	1	0	0	4	0	0
6	DF	(Netherlands)	Bradley de Nooijer	3	0	0	0	0	0	3	0	0
32	MF	(Brazil)	Romário Pires	3	0	0	1	0	0	4	0	0
21	DF	(Romania)	Alin Dobrosavlevici	3	0	0	0	0	0	3	0	0
97	DF	(Romania)	Alexandru Georgescu	1	0	0	0	0	0	1	0	0
80	FW	(Romania)	Alexi Pitu	2	0	0	0	0	0	2	0	0
66	MF	(Spain)	Josemi Castañeda	1	0	0	0	0	0	1	0	0
11	MF	(Romania)	Andrei Ciobanu	1	0	0	0	0	0	1	0	0
17	DF	(Romania)	Ionuț Larie	1	0	0	0	0	0	1	0	0
18	MF	(Romania)	Andrei Artean	1	0	0	0	0	0	1	0	0
23	DF	(Romania)	Virgil Ghiță	1	0	0	0	0	0	1	0	0
7	FW	(Romania)	George Ganea	1	0	0	0	0	0	1	0	0

=== List of international goals scored by Farul's players ===
#	Date	Team	Opponent	Player	Score	Result	Competition
1.	10 July 2021	Romania	Saudi Arabia	George Ganea	1–0	1–1	Friendly
2.	3 August 2021	Romania U19	Israel U19	Luca Andronache	1–0	2–0	Friendly
3.	3 August 2021	Romania U19	Israel U19	Luca Andronache	2–0	2–0	Friendly
4.	5 September 2021	Romania U17	Czech Republic U17	Enes Sali	2–1	3–1	Syrenka Cup (Friendly)
5.	5 September 2021	Romania U19	Bosnia and Herzegovina U19	Ștefan Bodișteanu	3–1	5–1	Friendly
6.	7 October 2021	Romania U19	Cyprus U19	Ștefan Bodișteanu	1–0	2–0	Friendly
7.	7 October 2021	Romania U20	Czech Republic U20	Eduard Rădăslăvescu	2–1	2–1	U-20 Friendly Tournament
8.	26 October 2021	Romania U17	San Marino U17	Enes Sali	4–0	5–0	2022 UEFA EURO U-17 qualification
9.	10 November 2021	Romania U19	Latvia U19	Ștefan Bodișteanu	1–0	1–0	2022 UEFA Under-19 qualification
10.	10 November 2021	Romania U20	Poland U20	Eduard Rădăslăvescu	1–0	2–1	U-20 Friendly Tournament
11.	13 November 2021	Romania U19	San Marino U19	Ștefan Bodișteanu	4–0	5–0	2022 UEFA Under-19 qualification
12.	16 November 2021	Romania U19	Turkey U19	Ștefan Bodișteanu	1–0	1–4	2022 UEFA Under-19 qualification

=== Managerial statistics (2021-22 season) ===
Manager	From	To	Record						
Manager	From	To	G	W	D	L	GF	GA	GD
(Romania) Gheorghe Hagi	21 July 2021	Present	15	7	3	5	18	9	46.67

== See also ==
- 2021–22 Cupa României
- 2021–22 Liga I
