= 2023–24 FCV Farul Constanța season =

FCV Farul Constanța
2023–24 season
- President: Gheorghe Popescu
- Manager: Gheorghe Hagi
- Stadium: Stadionul Viitorul
- Liga I: 5th
- Cupa României: Pre-season
- Supercupa României: Runners-up
- UEFA Champions League: First qualifying round
colours	Away colours	Third colours

The 2023–24 season will be FCV Farul Constanța's 124th season in existence and 12th consecutive in the Liga I. They will also compete in the Cupa României, the Supercupa României, and the UEFA Champions League.

== Players ==
=== First-team squad ===
As of 11 July 2023

Note: Flags indicate national team as defined under FIFA eligibility rules; some limited exceptions apply. Players may hold more than one non-FIFA nationality.

No.	Pos.	Nation	Player
1	GK	ROU	Alexandru Buzbuchi
3	DF	ROU	Mihai Popescu
4	MF	CIV	Kevin Doukouré
5	DF	POR	Diogo Queirós
6	MF	ROU	Tudor Băluță
7	FW	ROU	Denis Alibec (Vice-captain)
8	MF	ROU	Ionuț Vînă
9	FW	BRA	Rivaldinho
10	MF	ARG	Marco Borgnino
11	MF	BRA	Mateus Santos
12	GK	ROU	Mihai Aioani (3rd captain)
13	DF	POR	Fábio Vianna
14	DF	ROU	Daniel Bîrzu
15	DF	ROU	Gabriel Dănuleasa
16	MF	ROU	Dragoș Nedelcu
17	DF	ROU	Ionuț Larie (Captain)
18	MF	ROU	Andrei Artean (4th captain)

No.	Pos.	Nation	Player
19	FW	ROU	Luca Andronache
20	MF	BEL	Amine Benchaib
21	DF	CIV	Kévin Boli
22	DF	ROU	Dan Sîrbu
23	FW	ROU	Nicolae Carnat
24	MF	ROU	Dina Grameni
25	DF	BEN	David Kiki
26	FW	ROU	Adrian Mazilu
27	DF	ROU	Andrei Borza
29	MF	ROU	Valentin Dumitrache
34	GK	ROU	Ștefan Mușat
44	DF	CAN	Zorhan Bassong
45	DF	BRA	Gustavo Marins
77	FW	ROU	Enes Sali
98	MF	ROU	Nicolas Popescu
99	DF	MTQ	Damien Dussaut

=== Other players under contract ===
Note: Flags indicate national team as defined under FIFA eligibility rules; some limited exceptions apply. Players may hold more than one non-FIFA nationality.

No.	Pos.	Nation	Player
—	DF	ROU	Gabriel Buta
—	DF	ROU	Alexandru Sima
—	DF	ROU	Antonio Vlad

No.	Pos.	Nation	Player
—	DF	ROU	Alexandru Georgescu
—	MF	ROU	Cosmin Tucaliuc
—	FW	ROU	Alexandru Negrean

=== Out on loan ===
Note: Flags indicate national team as defined under FIFA eligibility rules; some limited exceptions apply. Players may hold more than one non-FIFA nationality.

No.	Pos.	Nation	Player
—	DF	ROU	David Maftei (to Steaua București)
—	MF	ROU	Răzvan Matiș (to Chindia Târgoviște)
—	MF	ROU	Denis Bujor (to Argeș Pitești)
—	MF	ROU	Răzvan Iorga (to FC Brașov)
—	MF	ROU	Răzvan Tănasă (to Oțelul Galați)

No.	Pos.	Nation	Player
—	FW	ROU	Ionuț Cojocaru (to Petrolul Ploiești)
—	FW	ROU	Robert Mustacă (to UTA Arad)
—	FW	ROU	Florian Haită (to Argeș Pitești)
—	FW	ROU	David Nemțanu (to FC Brașov)

== Pre-season and friendlies ==
29 June 2023 Friendly	Pogoń Szczecin (Poland)	2–1	(Romania) Farul Constanța	Opalenica, Poland
18:00 UTC+2				Stadium: Stadion Miejski

2 July 2023 Friendly	Farul Constanța (Romania)	0–5	(Czech Republic) Baník Ostrava	Poland
11:00 UTC+2

2 July 2023 Friendly	Warta Poznań (Poland)	3–0	(Romania) Farul Constanța	Grodzisk Wielkopolski, Poland
18:00 UTC+2				Stadium: Stadion Groclinu Dyskobolii

== Competitions ==
Competition	First match	Last match	Starting round	Final position	Record							
Competition	First match	Last match	Starting round	Final position	Pld	W	D	L	GF	GA	GD	Win %
Liga I	15 July 2023	19 May 2024	Matchday 1		1	1	0	0	1	0	+1	100.00
Cupa României	TBD				0	0	0	0	0	0	+0	—
Supercupa României	8 July 2023		Match	Runners-up	1	0	0	1	0	1	−1	0.00
UEFA Champions League	12 July 2023		First qualifying round		2	1	0	1	1	3	−2	50.00
Total					4	2	0	2	2	4	−2	50.00

Last updated: 18 July 2023
Source: Soccerway

=== Liga I ===
==== League table ====
Pos	Team	Pld	W	D	L	GF	GA	GD	Pts	Qualification
3	CFR Cluj	30	15	8	7	54	29	+25	53	Qualification to play-off round
4	Universitatea Craiova	30	13	10	7	47	38	+9	49	Qualification to play-off round
5	Farul Constanța	30	11	10	9	37	38	−1	43 (Note: Head to head points: Farul Constanța 6, Sepsi OSK 0)	Qualification to play-off round
6	Sepsi OSK	30	12	7	11	43	34	+9	43	Qualification to play-off round
7	Universitatea Cluj	30	10	12	8	35	38	−3	42	Qualification to play-out round

Source: , Soccerway
Rules for classification: 1) Points; 2) Head-to-head points; 3) Head-to-head goal difference; 4) Head-to-head goals scored; 5) Goal difference; 6) Goals scored; 7) Play-off.
Notes:

Pos	Team	Pld	W	D	L	GF	GA	GD	Pts	Qualification	FCS	CFR	UCV	FAR	SEP	RAP
1	FCSB (C)	10	5	2	3	12	11	+1	49	Qualification to Champions League first qualifying round		0–1	2–0	2–1	2–1	2–2
2	CFR Cluj	10	6	1	3	19	14	+5	46	Qualification to Conference League second qualifying round	0–1		1–2	5–1	2–1	3–2
3	Universitatea Craiova (O)	10	6	1	3	18	14	+4	44	Qualification to European competition play-offs	2–0	0–1		1–2	3–2	2–1
4	Farul Constanța	10	4	2	4	19	20	−1	36		0–1	5–1	3–3		1–4	3–1
5	Sepsi OSK	10	3	3	4	17	17	0	34		2–2	1–1	1–3	1–1		3–2
6	Rapid București	10	1	1	8	13	22	−9	32		2–0	1–4	1–2	1–2	0–1	

Source: Soccerway, FRF (in Romanian), LPF (in Romanian)
Legend: Blue = home team win; Yellow = draw; Red = away team win.
Rules for classification: 1) Points; 2) Points without rounding; 3) Points in the regular season; 4) Head-to-head points; 5) Head-to-head goal difference; 6) Head-to-head goals scored; 7) Goal difference; 8) Goals scored; 9) Play-off (only if needed to decide champion or teams for UEFA competitions). (Note: only criteria 7 and 8 are applied to establish the classification during the competition.)
(C) Champions; (O) Play-off winners

Pos	Team	Pld	W	D	L	GF	GA	GD	Pts	Qualification or relegation	UTA	OTE	HER	UCJ	PET	IAS	DIN	BOT	VOL	FCU
7	UTA Arad (Note: UTA Arad and Hermannstadt were ineligible to advance to the European competition play-offs because they did not receive a UEFA licence.)	9	5	2	2	15	11	+4	37			3–1	1–3					1–0	4–3	3–1
8	Oțelul Galați	9	6	1	2	11	7	+4	36	Qualification to European competition play-offs			1–0	1–0		1–0	1–0	2–0		
9	Hermannstadt	9	4	2	3	13	7	+6	34					1–1	2–0	0–1	3–0	1–1		
10	Universitatea Cluj	9	3	3	3	12	10	+2	33	Qualification to European competition play-offs	0–0				1–2	1–0	3–3	3–0		
11	Petrolul Ploiești	9	3	2	4	8	14	−6	29		1–1	2–1						1–2	0–4	1–0
12	Politehnica Iași	9	3	1	5	7	8	−1	27		0–2				2–0				3–1	0–0
13	Dinamo București (O)	9	2	4	3	10	12	−2	25	Qualification to relegation play-offs	2–0				1–1	1–0			1–1	
14	Botoșani (O)	9	4	2	3	11	11	0	25	Qualification to relegation play-offs						2–1	2–1		0–0	4–1
15	Voluntari (R)	9	2	4	3	11	10	+1	24	Relegation to Liga II		1–1	1–0	0–1						0–0
16	FCU 1948 Craiova (R)	9	1	3	5	8	16	−8	22	Relegation to Liga II		1–2	1–3	3–2			1–1			

Source: Soccerway, FRF (in Romanian), LPF (in Romanian)
Legend: Blue = home team win; Yellow = draw; Red = away team win.
Rules for classification: 1) Points; 2) Points without rounding; 3) Points in the regular season; 4) Head-to-head points; 5) Head-to-head goal difference; 6) Head-to-head goals scored; 7) Goal difference; 8) Goals scored; 9) Play-off (only if needed to decide teams for relegation). (Note: only criteria 7 and 8 are applied to establish the classification during the competition.)
(O) Play-off winners; (R) Relegated

==== Results summary ====
Overall								Home						Away					
Pld	W	D	L	GF	GA	GD	Pts	W	D	L	GF	GA	GD	W	D	L	GF	GA	GD
1	1	0	0	1	0	+1	3	0	0	0	0	0	0	1	0	0	1	0	+1

==== Results by round ====
Round	1	2
Ground	A	H
Result	W	
Position		

Updated to match(es) played on 15 July 2023. Source:
A = Away; H = Home; W = Win; D = Draw; L = Loss

==== Matches ====
The league fixtures were unveiled on 27 July 2023.

15 July 2023 1	Hermannstadt	0–1	Farul Constanța	Sibiu
18:30 UTC+3			Grameni 57'	Stadium: Stadionul Municipal; Referee: István Kovács

=== Supercupa României ===
8 July 2023 Match	Farul Constanța	0–1	Sepsi OSK	Ploieşti
20:00 UTC+3		Report	Gheorghe 47'	Stadium: Stadionul Ilie Oană; Referee: Andrei Florin Chivulete

=== UEFA Champions League ===
==== First qualifying round ====
The draw for the first qualifying round was held on 20 June 2023.

12 July 2023 First leg	Farul Constanța (Romania)	1–0	(Moldova) Sheriff Tiraspol	Ovidiu, Romania
20:30 UTC+3	Kiki 56'	Report		Stadium: Stadionul Viitorul; Attendance: 4,028; Referee: Sander van der Eijk (Netherlands)

18 July 2023 Second leg	Sheriff Tiraspol (Moldova)	3–0 (a.e.t.) (3–1 agg.)	(Romania) Farul Constanța	Tiraspol
20:00 UTC+3	Talal 45+1'; Ngom Mbekeli 99'; Ademo 105+1'	Report		Stadium: Sheriff Stadium; Referee: Miguel Nogueira (Portugal)
