= Constantin Grameni =

Romanian footballer (born 2002)

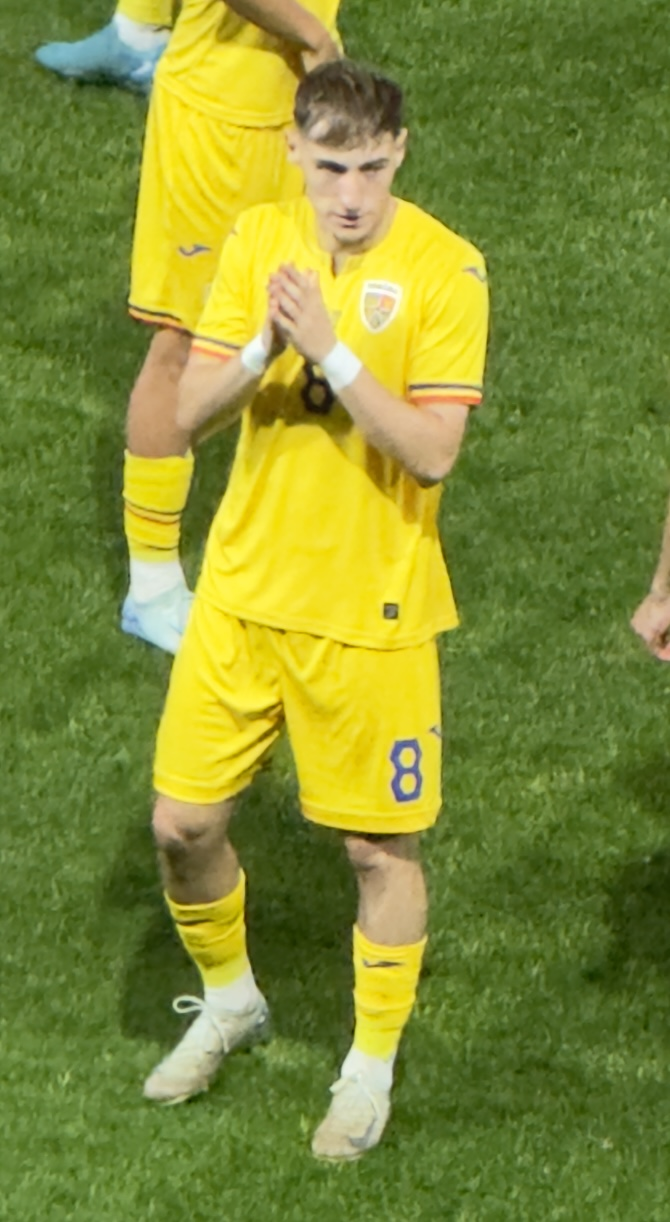
- Grameni with Romania U21 in 2024

Personal information
- Full name: Constantin Grameni
- Date of birth: 23 October 2002 (age 24)
- Place of birth: Constanța, Romania
- Height: 1.78 m (5 ft 10 in)
- Position: Midfielder

Team information
- Current team: Rapid București
- Number: 8

Youth career
- 2009–2020: Gheorghe Hagi Academy

Senior career*
Years	Team	Apps	(Gls)
2020–2021	Viitorul Constanța	11	(0)
2021–2024	Farul Constanța	116	(10)
2024–	Rapid București	63	(7)

International career^{‡}
2018	Romania U16	3	(0)
2018–2019	Romania U17	11	(0)
2019–2020	Romania U18	7	(0)
2021	Romania U20	5	(0)
2022–2025	Romania U21	23	(3)
- * Club domestic league appearances and goals as of 7 November 2026 ‡ National team caps and goals as of 17 June 2025

Constantin "Dina" Grameni (Romanian pronunciation: [konstanˈtin ˈdina ɡraˈmeni]; born 23 October 2002) is a Romanian professional footballer who plays as a midfielder for Liga I club Rapid București.

== Club career ==
=== Viitorul Constanța / Farul Constanța ===
Grameni made his professional debut for Viitorul Constanța on 4 April 2021, in a 0–1 Liga I away loss to Botoșani. He became a first-team regular after the club merged with Farul Constanța in the summer of 2021, amassing 30 league games in the 2021–22 season. On 17 February 2022, Grameni scored his first and only goal of the campaign in a 8–2 Liga I thrashing of Academica Clinceni.

On 31 August 2022, Grameni netted a goal in a 3–1 Liga I home defeat of FCSB. In the 2022–23 season, he collected six goals from 39 appearances to aid his side in winning the national title. Shortly before the conclusion of the championship, fellow league club Rapid București submitted a €1 million offer for Grameni, which was deemed too low by Farul president Gheorghe Popescu.

Grameni made his debut in European competitions on 18 July 2023, starting in a 0–3 away loss to Sheriff Tiraspol in the UEFA Champions League first qualifying round.

=== Rapid București ===
On 8 September 2024, more than one year after its initial bid, Rapid București transferred Grameni on a three-year contract with the option of another year for €400,000 and 30% interest.

== International career ==
Grameni was selected by manager Emil Săndoi in the Romania under-21 squad for the 2023 UEFA European Championship, but missed out on the final tournament after being ruled out with an injury.

== Career statistics ==
As of match played 7 November 2026

Appearances and goals by club, season and competition
Club	Season	League			Cupa României		Europe		Other		Total	
Club	Season	Division	Apps	Goals	Apps	Goals	Apps	Goals	Apps	Goals	Apps	Goals
Viitorul Constanța	2020–21	Liga I	11	0	0	0	—		2 (Note: Appearances in Liga I European play-offs)	0	13	0
Farul Constanța	2021–22	Liga I	30	1	0	0	—		—		30	1
Farul Constanța	2022–23	Liga I	39	6	0	0	—		—		39	6
Farul Constanța	2023–24	Liga I	39	3	0	0	6 (Note: One appearance in UEFA Champions League, five appearances in UEFA Europa Conference League)	0	0	0	46	3
Farul Constanța	2024–25	Liga I	8	0	0	0	—		—		8	0
Farul Constanța	Total		116	10	0	0	7	0	0	0	123	10
Rapid București	2024–25	Liga I	18	0	3	1	—		—		21	1
Rapid București	2025–26	Liga I	30	4	3	0	—		—		33	4
Rapid București	2026–27	Liga I	15	3	2	0	—		—		17	3
Rapid București	Total		63	7	8	1	—		—		71	8
Career total			190	17	8	1	7	0	2	0	207	18

== Honours ==
Farul Constanța

- Liga I: 2022–23
- Supercupa României runner-up: 2023
