= Ionuț Larie =

Romanian footballer

Personal information
- Full name: Ionuț Justinian Larie
- Date of birth: 16 January 1987 (age 39)
- Place of birth: Constanța, Romania
- Height: 1.91 m (6 ft 3 in)
- Positions: Centre-back; defensive midfielder

Team information
- Current team: Farul Constanța
- Number: 17

Youth career
- –2005: Farul Constanța

Senior career*
Years	Team	Apps	(Gls)
2005–2010	Farul Constanța	23	(0)
2005	→ Portul Constanța (loan)	15	(1)
2008	→ CSM Râmnicu Vâlcea (loan)	10	(0)
2008	→ Delta Tulcea (loan)	13	(1)
2009–2010	→ Delta Tulcea (loan)	13	(1)
2010–2014	Viitorul Constanța	111	(6)
2014–2017	CFR Cluj	102	(5)
2017–2018	FCSB	15	(1)
2018–2019	Tobol	12	(0)
2019–2021	Gaz Metan Mediaș	73	(4)
2021–	Farul Constanța	168	(17)

International career
2007	Romania U21	1	(0)
- * Club domestic league appearances and goals as of 25 October 2026

Ionuț Justinian Larie (born 16 January 1987) is a Romanian professional footballer who plays as a centre-back or a defensive midfielder for Liga I club Farul Constanța, which he captains.

== Career statistics ==
As of 25 October 2026

Appearances and goals by club, season and competition
Club	Season	League			National cup (Note: Includes Cupa României)		League cup (Note: Includes Cupa Ligii)		Europe		Other		Total	
Club	Season	Division	Apps	Goals	Apps	Goals	Apps	Goals	Apps	Goals	Apps	Goals	Apps	Goals
Portul Constanța (loan)	2005–06	Divizia B	15	1	0	0	—		—		—		15	1
Farul Constanța	2005–06	Divizia A	1	0	0	0	—		—		—		1	0
Farul Constanța	2006–07	Liga I	3	0	0	0	—		5 (Note: Appearances in UEFA Intertoto Cup)	0	—		8	0
Farul Constanța	2007–08	Liga I	4	0	0	0	—		—		—		4	0
Farul Constanța	2008–09	Liga I	6	0	—		—		—		—		6	0
Farul Constanța	2009–10	Liga II	9	0	—		—		—		—		9	0
Farul Constanța	Total		23	0	0	0	—		5	0	—		28	0
CSM Râmnicu Vâlcea (loan)	2007–08	Liga II	10	0	—		—		—		—		10	0
Delta Tulcea (loan)	2008–09	Liga II	13	1	0	0	—		—		—		13	1
Delta Tulcea (loan)	2009–10	Liga II	13	1	0	0	—		—		—		13	1
Delta Tulcea (loan)	Total		26	2	0	0	—		—		—		26	2
Viitorul Constanța	2010–11	Liga II	30	1	1	0	—		—		—		31	1
Viitorul Constanța	2011–12	Liga II	24	1	1	0	—		—		—		25	1
Viitorul Constanța	2012–13	Liga I	30	1	0	0	—		—		—		30	1
Viitorul Constanța	2013–14	Liga I	27	3	3	0	—		—		—		30	3
Viitorul Constanța	Total		111	6	5	0	—		—		—		116	6
CFR Cluj	2014–15	Liga I	32	2	5	0	0	0	4 (Note: Appearances in UEFA Europa League)	0	—		41	2
CFR Cluj	2015–16	Liga I	34	1	4	0	1	0	—		—		39	1
CFR Cluj	2016–17	Liga I	36	2	2	0	2	0	—		1 (Note: Appearance in Supercupa României)	0	41	2
CFR Cluj	Total		102	5	11	0	3	0	4	0	1	0	121	5
FCSB	2017–18	Liga I	15	1	3	0	—		6 (Note: Four appearances in UEFA Champions League, two appearances in UEFA Europa League)	0	—		24	1
Tobol	2018	Kazakhstan Premier League	12	0	0	0	—		—		—		12	0
Gaz Metan Mediaș	2018–19	Liga I	13	3	0	0	—		—		—		13	3
Gaz Metan Mediaș	2019–20	Liga I	34	0	1	0	—		—		—		35	0
Gaz Metan Mediaș	2020–21	Liga I	26	1	2	0	—		—		—		28	1
Gaz Metan Mediaș	Total		73	4	3	0	—		—		—		76	4
Farul Constanța	2021–22	Liga I	39	1	1	0	—		—		—		40	1
Farul Constanța	2022–23	Liga I	39	3	0	0	—		—		—		39	3
Farul Constanța	2023–24	Liga I	30	7	0	0	—		7 (Note: One appearance in UEFA Champions League, six appearances and one goal in UEFA Europa Conference League)	1	0	0	37	8
Farul Constanța	2024–25	Liga I	17	1	2	1	—		—		—		19	2
Farul Constanța	2025–26	Liga I	35	5	0	0	—		—		2 (Note: Appearances in Liga I promotion/relegation play-offs)	0	37	5
Farul Constanța	2026–27	Liga I	8	0	1	0	—		—		—		9	0
Farul Constanța	Total		168	17	4	1	—		7	1	2	0	181	19
Career total			555	36	26	1	3	0	22	1	3	0	609	38

== Honours ==
CFR Cluj

- Cupa României: 2015–16
- Supercupa României runner-up: 2016

Farul Constanța

- Liga I: 2022–23
- Supercupa României runner-up: 2023

Individual

- Liga I Team of the Season: 2016–17, 2022–23
