= Gabriel Buta =

Romanian footballer (born 2002)

Personal information
- Full name: Gabriel Nicolae Buta
- Date of birth: 29 January 2002 (age 24)
- Place of birth: Salonta, Romania
- Height: 1.85 m (6 ft 1 in)
- Position: Centre back

Team information
- Current team: Szentlőrinc
- Number: 4

Youth career
- 2012–2018: Olimpia Salonta
- 2019–2021: Gheorghe Hagi Academy

Senior career*
Years	Team	Apps	(Gls)
2018–2019	Șoimii Lipova	5	(1)
2021	Viitorul Constanța	3	(0)
2021–2026	Farul Constanța	12	(0)
2022–2023	→ Unirea Dej (loan)	22	(0)
2023–2024	→ FC U Craiova (loan)	4	(0)
2025–2026	→ CSM Slatina (loan)	17	(0)
2026–	Szentlőrinc	1	(0)

International career^{‡}
2020	Romania U18	3	(0)
2021	Romania U19	1	(0)
2021–2023	Romania U20	13	(1)
2021	Romania Olympic	1	(0)
- * Club domestic league appearances and goals as of 20 September 2026 ‡ National team caps and goals as of 27 March 2023

Gabriel Nicolae Buta (born 29 January 2002) is a Romanian professional footballer who plays as a center back for Nemzeti Bajnokság II club Szentlőrinc.

== Club career ==
=== Viitorul Constanta ===
He made his league debut on 26 April 2021 in Liga I match against Voluntari.

== Career statistics ==
As of match played 9 May 2026

Appearances and goals by club, season and competition
Club	Season	League			Cupa României		Europe		Other		Total	
Club	Season	Division	Apps	Goals	Apps	Goals	Apps	Goals	Apps	Goals	Apps	Goals
Șoimii Lipova	2018–19	Liga III	5	1	—		—		—		5	1
Viitorul Constanța	2020–21	Liga I	3	0	—		—		—		3	0
Farul Constanța	2021–22	Liga I	4	0	1	0	—		—		5	0
Farul Constanța	2023–24	Liga I	0	0	0	0	0	0	0	0	0	0
Farul Constanța	2024–25	Liga I	8	0	5	1	—		—		13	1
Farul Constanța	2025–26	Liga I	0	0	0	0	—		—		0	0
Farul Constanța	Total		12	0	6	1	0	0	0	0	18	1
Unirea Dej (loan)	2022–23	Liga II	22	0	1	0	—		—		23	0
FC U Craiova (loan)	2023–24	Liga I	4	0	1	0	—		—		5	0
CSM Slatina (loan)	2025–26	Liga II	17	0	1	0	—		—		18	0
Szentlőrinc	2026–27	Nemzeti Bajnokság II	1	0	0	0	—		—		1	0
Career total			64	1	9	1	0	0	0	0	73	2

== Honours ==
Farul Constanța

- Supercupa României runner-up: 2023
