= Dragoș Nedelcu =

Romanian footballer

Personal information
- Full name: Dragoș Ionuț Nedelcu
- Date of birth: 16 February 1997 (age 29)
- Place of birth: Constanța, Romania
- Height: 1.89 m (6 ft 2 in)
- Positions: Defensive midfielder; centre-back

Team information
- Current team: Minaur Baia Mare
- Number: 14

Youth career
- 2009–2014: Gheorghe Hagi Academy

Senior career*
Years	Team	Apps	(Gls)
2014–2017	Viitorul Constanța	69	(2)
2017–2022	FCSB	62	(2)
2021	FCSB II	1	(0)
2021–2022	→ Fortuna Düsseldorf (loan)	10	(0)
2022	→ Farul Constanța (loan)	15	(2)
2022–2025	Farul Constanța	63	(1)
2025–2026	CSA Steaua București	14	(0)
2026–	Minaur Baia Mare	6	(1)

International career^{‡}
2013–2014	Romania U17	2	(0)
2016	Romania U19	3	(0)
2014–2019	Romania U21	27	(0)
2021	Romania Olympic	2	(0)
2016–2021	Romania	6	(0)
- * Club domestic league appearances and goals as of 2 October 2026 ‡ National team caps and goals as of 14 November 2021

Dragoș Ionuț Nedelcu (Romanian pronunciation: [ˈdraɡoʃ joˈnuts neˈdelku]; born 16 February 1997) is a Romanian professional footballer who plays as a defensive midfielder or a centre-back for Liga III club Minaur Baia Mare.

Nedelcu started his senior career at Viitorul Constanța, for which he made his debut at age 17. He aided the side in winning its first national championship in the 2016–17 season, before being transferred to fellow league team FCSB.

Internationally, Nedelcu earned his first cap for Romania in November 2016, in a 0–1 loss to Russia. He represented the under-21 team at the 2019 UEFA European Championship, where they managed to progress to the semi-finals as group winners.

== Club career ==
=== Viitorul Constanța ===
Nedelcu made his professional debut for Viitorul Constanța on 18 July 2014, in a 3–3 draw with Botoșani counting for the season's Cupa Ligii; Viitorul went further after a 5–3 penalty shoot-out win. His first appearance in the Liga I came ten days later, in a goalless draw at CSM Studențesc Iași.

=== FCSB ===
On 10 August 2017, Nedelcu signed a five-year contract with FCSB, one month after having initially refused to do so by arguing that he dreams of playing abroad. Him and his Viitorul teammate Romario Benzar were acquired by the Bucharest-based club for a combined cost of €2.7 million, and an additional €500,000 fee was paid for Nedelcu in November to remove an interest clause in his deal.

Nedelcu made his debut for the Roș-albaștrii in a 1–1 league draw with Astra Giurgiu on 12 August 2017. On 5 November that year, he scored his first goal in a 2–1 victory over Concordia Chiajna.

==== Loans to Fortuna Düsseldorf and Farul Constanța ====
Nedelcu often struggled with injuries during his stint in the capital, and on 12 June 2021 was sent out on a one-year loan with a purchase option to 2. Bundesliga club Fortuna Düsseldorf. On 4 February 2022, after his loan at Fortuna was cancelled prematurely, he moved to his boyhood club Viitorul—now renamed Farul Constanța—on loan for the remainder of the campaign.

=== Farul Constanța ===
On 14 June 2022, Nedelcu moved to Farul Constanța on a permanent basis after signing a three-year contract.

== International career ==
In November 2016, Nedelcu received his first call-up to the Romania senior team for the matches against Poland and Russia. He made his debut by coming on for Bogdan Stancu in the 0–1 friendly loss against the latter country.

== Career statistics ==
=== Club ===
As of match played 2 October 2026

Appearances and goals by club, season and competition
Club	Season	League			National cup (Note: Includes Cupa României, DFB-Pokal)		League cup (Note: Includes Cupa Ligii)		Continental		Other		Total	
Club	Season	Division	Apps	Goals	Apps	Goals	Apps	Goals	Apps	Goals	Apps	Goals	Apps	Goals
Viitorul Constanța	2014–15	Liga I	15	0	1	1	2	0	—		—		18	1
Viitorul Constanța	2015–16	Liga I	22	1	0	0	1	0	—		—		23	1
Viitorul Constanța	2016–17	Liga I	28	1	0	0	0	0	2 (Note: Appearances in UEFA Europa League)	0	—		30	1
Viitorul Constanța	2017–18	Liga I	4	0	—		—		2 (Note: Appearances in UEFA Champions League)	0	1 (Note: Appearance in Supercupa României)	0	7	0
Viitorul Constanța	Total		69	2	1	1	3	0	4	0	1	0	78	3
FCSB	2017–18	Liga I	18	1	2	0	—		6	0	—		26	1
FCSB	2018–19	Liga I	26	0	1	0	—		2	0	—		29	0
FCSB	2019–20	Liga I	11	1	1	0	—		3	0	—		15	1
FCSB	2020–21	Liga I	7	0	1	0	—		0	0	1	0	9	0
FCSB	Total		62	2	5	0	—		11	0	1	0	79	2
FCSB II	2020–21	Liga III	1	0	—		—		—		—		1	0
Fortuna Düsseldorf (loan)	2021–22	2. Bundesliga	10	0	1	0	—		—		—		11	0
Farul Constanța (loan)	2021–22	Liga I	15	2	—		—		—		—		15	2
Farul Constanța	2022–23	Liga I	29	1	1	0	—		—		—		30	1
Farul Constanța	2023–24	Liga I	24	0	0	0	—		8 (Note: Two appearances in UEFA Champions League, six appearances and one goal in UEFA Europa Conference League)	1	1	0	33	1
Farul Constanța	2024–25	Liga I	10	0	0	0	—		—		—		10	0
Farul Constanța	Total		78	3	1	0	—		8	1	1	0	88	4
CSA Steaua București	2025–26	Liga II	14	0	—		—		—		—		14	0
Minaur Baia Mare	2026–27	Liga II	6	1	0	0	—		—		—		6	1
Career total			240	8	8	1	3	0	23	1	3	0	277	10

=== International ===
As of match played 14 November 2021

Appearances and goals by national team and year
National team	Year	Apps	Goals
Romania	2016	1	0
Romania	2018	1	0
Romania	2021	4	0
Total		6	0

== Honours ==
Viitorul Constanța

- Liga I: 2016–17
- Supercupa României runner-up: 2017

FCSB

- Cupa României: 2019–20
- Supercupa României runner-up: 2020

Farul Constanța

- Liga I: 2022–23
- Supercupa României runner-up: 2023
