= Gabriel Dănuleasă =

Romanian footballer

Personal information
- Full name: Gabriel Leonard Dănuleasă
- Date of birth: 8 May 2003 (age 23)
- Place of birth: Călărași, Romania
- Height: 1.87 m (6 ft 2 in)
- Position: Centre-back

Team information
- Current team: Bytča
- Number: 5

Youth career
- 2013–2021: Gheorghe Hagi Academy

Senior career*
Years	Team	Apps	(Gls)
2020–2021	Viitorul Constanța	0	(0)
2021–2026	Farul Constanța	20	(0)
2025	→ Afumați (loan)	6	(0)
2025	→ Metalul Buzău (loan)	7	(0)
2026–	Bytča	10	(1)

International career^{‡}
2018–2019	Romania U16	3	(0)
2019–2020	Romania U17	6	(0)
2021	Romania U18	2	(0)
2021–2022	Romania U19	9	(1)
2021–2023	Romania U20	3	(0)
2024	Romania U21	3	(0)
- * Club domestic league appearances and goals as of 3 October 2026 ‡ National team caps and goals as of 11 October 2024

Gabriel Leonard Dănuleasă (born 8 May 2003) is a Romanian professional footballer who plays as a centre-back for Slovak Second League club Bytča.

== Club career ==
=== Farul Constanta ===
He made his league debut on 18 July 2021 in Liga I match against UTA Arad.

== Career statistics ==
As of match played 3 October 2026

Appearances and goals by club, season and competition
Club	Season	League			National cup (Note: Includes Cupa României, Slovak Cup)		Europe		Other		Total	
Club	Season	Division	Apps	Goals	Apps	Goals	Apps	Goals	Apps	Goals	Apps	Goals
Farul Constanța	2021–22	Liga I	1	0	—		—		—		1	0
Farul Constanța	2023–24	Liga I	9	0	2	0	—		—		11	0
Farul Constanța	2024–25	Liga I	10	0	2	0	—		—		12	0
Farul Constanța	Total		20	0	4	0	—		—		24	0
Afumați (loan)	2024–25	Liga II	6	0	—		—		—		6	0
Metalul Buzău (loan)	2025–26	Liga II	7	0	2	0	—		—		9	0
Bytča	2026–27	Slovak Second League	10	1	1	0	—		—		11	1
Career total			43	1	7	0	—		—		50	1

== Honours ==
Farul Constanța

- Liga I: 2022–23
- Supercupa României runner-up: 2023
