= Nicolas Popescu =

Romanian footballer

Personal information
- Date of birth: 2 January 2003 (age 23)
- Place of birth: Istanbul, Turkey
- Height: 1.85 m (6 ft 1 in)
- Position: Defensive midfielder

Team information
- Current team: Farul Constanța
- Number: 80

Youth career
- 2015–2021: Gheorghe Hagi Academy

Senior career*
Years	Team	Apps	(Gls)
2021–	Farul Constanța	41	(0)
2022–2023	→ Voluntari (loan)	3	(0)
2025–2026	→ CSA Steaua București (loan)	20	(2)

International career
2018	Romania U15	6	(0)
2018–2019	Romania U16	3	(0)
2021	Romania U19	12	(0)
2022	Romania U20	3	(0)
- * Club domestic league appearances and goals as of 2 November 2026

Nicolas Popescu (born 2 January 2003) is a Romanian professional footballer who plays as a defensive midfielder for Liga I club Farul Constanța.

== Club career ==
=== Farul Constanţa ===
He made his league debut on 18 July 2021 in Liga I match against UTA Arad.

== Personal life ==
Nicolas Popescu is the son of former Romanian international Gheorghe Popescu, the nephew of former Romanian international Gheorghe Hagi and the cousin of Ianis Hagi who plays for Süper Lig club Alanyaspor.

== Career statistics ==
As of match played 2 November 2026

Appearances and goals by club, season and competition
Club	Season	League			Cupa României		Europe		Other		Total	
Club	Season	Division	Apps	Goals	Apps	Goals	Apps	Goals	Apps	Goals	Apps	Goals
Farul Constanța	2021–22	Liga I	7	0	0	0	—		—		7	0
Farul Constanța	2022–23	Liga I	1	0	—		—		—		1	0
Farul Constanța	2023–24	Liga I	7	0	3	0	0	0	0	0	10	0
Farul Constanța	2024–25	Liga I	17	0	5	0	—		—		22	0
Farul Constanța	2025–26	Liga I	0	0	0	0	—		—		0	0
Farul Constanța	2026–27	Liga I	9	0	1	0	—		—		10	0
Farul Constanța	Total		41	0	9	0	0	0	0	0	50	0
Voluntari (loan)	2022–23	Liga I	3	0	1	0	—		—		4	0
CSA Steaua București (loan)	2025–26	Liga II	20	2	—		—		—		20	2
Career total			64	2	10	0	0	0	0	0	74	2

== Honours ==
Farul Constanța

- Liga I: 2022–23
- Supercupa României runner-up: 2023
