= 2016–17 Liga I =

99th season of top-tier football league in Romania

Liga I
- Season: 2016–17
- Champions: Viitorul Constanța (1st title)
- Relegated: Pandurii Târgu Jiu; Târgu Mureș
- Champions League: Viitorul Constanța; FCSB
- Europa League: Dinamo București; Universitatea Craiova; Astra Giurgiu
- Matches: 268
- Goals: 613 (2.29 per match)
- Top goalscorer: Azdren Llullaku (16 goals)
- Best goalkeeper: Florin Niță; Branko Grahovac (13 clean sheets)
- Biggest home win: CFR Cluj 5–0 Voluntari (17 September 2016); Universitatea Craiova 5–0 Voluntari (4 February 2017); Viitorul Constanța 5–0 ACS Poli Timișoara (25 February 2017)
- Biggest away win: ACS Poli Timișoara 0–5 Botoșani (18 August 2016)
- Highest scoring: Pandurii Târgu Jiu 2–5 Gaz Metan Mediaș (10 December 2016)
- Longest winning run: 8 matches: Astra Giurgiu
- Longest unbeaten run: 15 matches: Politehnica Iași
- Longest winless run: 12 matches: ASA Târgu Mureș
- Longest losing run: 6 matches: ASA Târgu Mureș; Politehnica Iași
- Highest attendance: 37,669; Dinamo București 2–1 FCSB (1 May 2017)
- Lowest attendance: 34; Pandurii Târgu Jiu 1–1 Voluntari (1 December 2016)
- Total attendance: 1,103,039
- Average attendance: 4,178
- All statistics correct as of 5 June 2017.

The 2016–17 Liga I (also known as Liga 1 Betano for sponsorship reasons) was the 99th season of the Liga I, the top professional league for Romanian association football clubs. The season began on 22 July 2016 and concluded on 5 June 2017, being the second to take place since the play-off/play-out format has been introduced. Viitorul Constanța were crowned champions for the first time in their history.

== Teams ==
The last two teams from the 2015–16 season, ACS Poli Timișoara and Petrolul Ploiești, were relegated to their respective 2016–17 Liga II division. The first team from each of the two divisions of 2015–16 Liga II advanced to Liga I.

On 21 July 2016 Rapid București was excluded from Liga I after the club went into dissolution. Their place was taken by ACS Poli Timișoara.

=== Renamed teams ===
CSM Studențesc Iași was renamed as CSM Politehnica Iași.
FC Steaua București was renamed as FCSB.

=== Venues ===
FCSB (Note: Since 29 November 2015 to 18 March 2016, Steaua was relocated to Nicolae Dobrin Stadium from Pitești, as a result of Arena Națională not having an ISU licence.)	ACS Poli Timișoara	CFR Cluj	Pandurii Târgu Jiu
Arena Națională	Dan Păltinișanu	Dr. Constantin Rădulescu	Municipal (Note: Pandurii was relocated to Municipal Stadium from Drobeta-Turnu Severin for the next two seasons, as a result of the renovations of the Tudor Vladimirescu Stadium.)
Capacity: 55,634	Capacity: 32,972	Capacity: 23,500	Capacity: 20,054
Dinamo București	2016–17 Liga I (Romania) Location of Bucharest teams.		CSM Politehnica Iași
Dinamo	2016–17 Liga I (Romania) Location of Bucharest teams.		Emil Alexandrescu
Capacity: 15,032	2016–17 Liga I (Romania) Location of Bucharest teams.		Capacity: 11,390
Astra Giurgiu	2016–17 Liga I (Romania) Location of Bucharest teams.		Târgu Mureș (Note: Târgu Mureș on 22 November and 2 December 2015, ASA Târgu Mureș played two home matches at Cluj Arena from Cluj-Napoca, as a result of Trans-Sil Stadium not having an ISU licence.)
Marin Anastasovici	2016–17 Liga I (Romania) Location of Bucharest teams.		Trans-Sil
Capacity: 8,500	2016–17 Liga I (Romania) Location of Bucharest teams.		Capacity: 8,200
Gaz Metan Mediaș	2016–17 Liga I (Romania) Location of Bucharest teams.		FC Botoșani
Gaz Metan	2016–17 Liga I (Romania) Location of Bucharest teams.		Municipal
Capacity: 7,814	2016–17 Liga I (Romania) Location of Bucharest teams.		Capacity: 7,782
Universitatea Craiova (Note: Universitatea Craiova was relocated to Extensiv Stadium for this season, as a result of the demolition of the old Ion Oblemenco Stadium, that is planned to be replaced by a modern arena, new Ion Oblemenco Stadium.)	Concordia Chiajna	FC Voluntari	Viitorul Constanța (Note: Viitorul was relocated to Viitorul Stadium from Ovidiu, as a result of the opening of the stadium.)
Extensiv	Concordia	Anghel Iordănescu	Viitorul
Capacity: 7,000	Capacity: 5,123	Capacity: 4,600	Capacity: 4,554

=== Personnel and kits ===
Note: Flags indicate national team as has been defined under FIFA eligibility rules. Players and Managers may hold more than one non-FIFA nationality.

Team	Manager	Captain	Kit manufacturer	Shirt sponsor
ACS Poli Timișoara	(Romania) Ionuț Popa	(Romania) Marius Croitoru	Joma	Casa Rusu
Astra Giurgiu	(Romania) Marius Șumudică	(Brazil) Júnior Morais	Joma	Tinmar
Botoșani	(Romania) Leontin Grozavu	(Romania) Gabriel Vașvari	Nike	Elsaco
CFR Cluj	(Romania) Vasile Miriuță	(Portugal) Mário Camora	Masita	Enex
Concordia Chiajna	(Romania) Dan Alexa	(Romania) Cristian Bălgrădean	Lotto	—
CSM Politehnica Iași	(Romania) Eugen Neagoe	(Romania) Ionuț Voicu	Nike	Blue Air
CS U Craiova	(Romania) Gheorghe Mulțescu	(Romania) Andrei Ivan	Joma	Sticky
Dinamo București	(Romania) Cosmin Contra	(Croatia) Antun Palić	Nike	Orange
FCSB	(Romania) Laurențiu Reghecampf	(Romania) Denis Alibec	Nike	City Insurance
Gaz Metan Mediaș	(Romania) Cristian Pustai	(Romania) Ionuț Buzean	Joma	Romgaz
Pandurii Târgu Jiu	(Romania) Flavius Stoican	(Romania) Răzvan Stanca	Nike	Artego
Târgu Mureș	(Romania) Ionel Ganea	(Romania) Gabriel Mureșan	Joma	energo+
Viitorul Constanța	(Romania) Gheorghe Hagi	(Romania) Romario Benzar	Nike	Lotto Snacks
Voluntari	(Romania) Claudiu Niculescu	(Romania) Vasile Maftei	Puma	Primăria Orașului Voluntari

=== Managerial changes ===
Team	Outgoing manager	Manner of departure	Date of vacancy	Position in table	Incoming manager	Date of appointment
Dinamo București	(Romania) Mircea Rednic	Mutual agreement	20 May 2016	Pre-season	(Romania) Ioan Andone	23 May 2016
Universitatea Craiova	(Romania) Victor Naicu	End of contract	31 May 2016	Pre-season	(Romania) Gheorghe Mulțescu	9 June 2016
Târgu Mureș	(Romania) George Ciorceri	End of contract	31 May 2016	Pre-season	(Italy) Dario Bonetti	17 June 2016
Pandurii Târgu Jiu	(Romania) Edward Iordănescu	End of contract	31 May 2016	Pre-season	(Romania) Petre Grigoraș	26 June 2016
Concordia Chiajna	(Romania) Adrian Falub	End of contract	31 May 2016	Pre-season	(Romania) Emil Săndoi	28 June 2016
CFR Cluj	(Portugal) Toni Conceição	Mutual agreement	27 June 2016	Pre-season	(Romania) Vasile Miriuță	27 June 2016
Târgu Mureș	(Italy) Dario Bonetti	Mutual agreement	6 August 2016	13	(Romania) Dan Alexa	11 August 2016
CSM Poli Iași	(Italy) Nicolò Napoli	Sacked	7 October 2016	9	(Romania) Eugen Neagoe	8 October 2016
Concordia Chiajna	(Romania) Emil Săndoi	Mutual agreement	5 November 2016	11	(Romania) Emil Ursu (caretaker)	6 November 2016
Concordia Chiajna	(Romania) Emil Ursu (caretaker)	End of tenure as caretaker	23 December 2016	12	(Romania) Dan Alexa	23 December 2016
Târgu Mureș	(Romania) Dan Alexa	Mutual agreement	22 December 2016	13	(Romania) Ilie Stan	28 December 2016
Pandurii Târgu Jiu	(Romania) Petre Grigoraș	Sacked	9 January 2017	11	(Romania) Flavius Stoican	11 January 2017
Dinamo București	(Romania) Ioan Andone	Sacked	14 February 2017	6	(Romania) Cosmin Contra	17 February 2017
Târgu Mureș	(Romania) Ilie Stan	Mutual agreement	20 March 2017	14	(Romania) Ionuț Chirilă	24 March 2017
Voluntari	(Romania) Dinu Todoran	Mutual agreement	2 April 2017	10	(Romania) Claudiu Niculescu	3 April 2017
Târgu Mureș	(Romania) Ionuț Chirilă	Sacked	12 April 2017	14	(Romania) Ionel Ganea	15 April 2017

== Regular season ==
In the regular season the 14 teams will meet twice, a total of 26 matches per team, with the top 6 advancing to the Championship round and the bottom 8 qualifying for Relegation round.

=== Table ===
Pos	Team	Pld	W	D	L	GF	GA	GD	Pts	Qualification
1	Viitorul Constanța	26	16	3	7	39	22	+17	51	Qualification for the Championship round
2	Steaua București	26	13	8	5	34	22	+12	47	Qualification for the Championship round
3	Astra Giurgiu	26	13	5	8	32	28	+4	44	Qualification for the Championship round
4	CFR Cluj (Note: CFR Cluj were deducted six points for failing to comply with licensing requirements.)	26	14	7	5	42	23	+19	43	Qualification for the Championship round
5	Universitatea Craiova	26	13	4	9	36	26	+10	43	Qualification for the Championship round
6	Dinamo București	26	12	5	9	40	33	+7	41	Qualification for the Championship round
7	Gaz Metan Mediaș	26	10	9	7	36	27	+9	39	Qualification for the Relegation round
8	Botoșani	26	9	5	12	30	31	−1	32	Qualification for the Relegation round
9	Voluntari	26	8	6	12	30	37	−7	30	Qualification for the Relegation round
10	CSM Politehnica Iași	26	8	5	13	28	31	−3	29	Qualification for the Relegation round
11	Concordia Chiajna	26	6	7	13	17	32	−15	25	Qualification for the Relegation round
12	Pandurii Târgu Jiu (Note: Pandurii Târgu Jiu were deducted six points (three for failing to comply with licensing requirements and three as penalty points).)	26	6	7	13	24	42	−18	19	Qualification for the Relegation round
13	ACS Poli Timișoara (Note: Poli Timișoara were deducted 14 points; eight points for failing to get enough points in the previous season and six points for failing to comply with licensing requirements.)	26	7	7	12	25	42	−17	14	Qualification for the Relegation round
14	Târgu Mureș (Note: Târgu Mureș were deducted nine points for failing to comply with licensing requirements.)	26	5	6	15	20	37	−17	12	Qualification for the Relegation round

Source: Liga 1, Soccerway
Rules for classification: 1) Points; 2) Head-to-head points; 3) Head-to-head goal difference; 4) Head-to-head goals scored; 5) Goal difference; 6) Goals scored; 7) Play-off.

=== Results ===
Home \ Away	ACS	AST	BOT	CFR	CON	IAS	CSU	DIN	FCSB	GAZ	PAN	TGM	VII	VOL
ACS Poli Timișoara		2–0	0–5	1–1	1–1	2–1	3–2	1–2	0–1	1–1	1–3	0–1	1–0	1–0
Astra Giurgiu	3–1		3–0	1–2	1–1	1–0	1–2	1–4	1–0	0–2	2–0	1–0	1–0	1–1
Botoșani	2–0	0–0		3–1	1–1	1–3	1–0	2–1	0–2	0–0	3–1	4–2	1–2	0–1
CFR Cluj	2–2	5–1	1–0		2–0	1–0	0–0	0–0	1–1	1–1	0–1	2–0	1–0	5–0
Concordia Chiajna	0–2	1–3	0–2	1–2		0–0	0–0	2–1	1–0	1–0	0–0	1–2	1–2	0–4
CSM Politehnica Iași	0–1	2–3	0–1	1–2	1–0		2–1	3–1	0–2	3–1	3–2	0–0	0–0	1–2
CS U Craiova	2–0	0–1	1–0	2–1	1–1	2–0		2–1	1–2	1–0	2–1	2–1	2–1	5–0
Dinamo București	2–1	2–2	1–0	0–2	0–1	3–1	2–1		3–1	1–1	4–0	1–0	1–2	3–1
FC Steaua București	1–0	1–0	0–0	1–2	1–0	1–1	2–1	1–1		0–1	3–1	1–1	2–0	2–2
Gaz Metan Mediaș	1–1	0–1	0–0	1–2	3–1	2–1	2–2	4–0	1–1		1–3	2–1	2–1	1–0
Pandurii Târgu Jiu	2–2	0–0	2–1	1–1	0–1	1–1	2–1	0–2	0–1	2–5		1–0	0–1	1–1
Târgu Mureș	0–0	0–2	2–0	1–3	0–1	0–3	0–2	2–1	1–1	1–3	3–0		0–2	0–0
Viitorul Constanța	5–0	1–0	3–1	2–1	2–1	1–0	2–0	1–1	1–3	1–1	3–0	3–1		2–1
Voluntari	4–1	1–2	4–2	2–1	1–0	0–1	0–1	1–2	2–3	1–0	0–0	1–1	0–1	

Source: Liga 1
Legend: Blue = home team win; Yellow = draw; Red = away team win.

=== Positions by round ===
Team ╲ Round	1	2	3	4	5	6	7	8	9	10	11	12	13	14	15	16	17	18	19	20	21	22	23	24	25	26
ACS Poli Timișoara	14	14	14	14	14	14	14	14	14	14	14	14	14	14	14	14	13	14	14	14	14	13	13	13	13	13
FC Astra Giurgiu	11	10	10	10	11	11	11	12	11	11	12	12	10	10	10	10	10	10	9	7	7	6	5	5	3	3
FC Botoșani	1	1	5	6	6	4	2	5	3	4	4	4	4	4	7	7	7	7	7	8	8	8	8	9	8	8
FC CFR Cluj	12	12	12	12	12	12	12	11	10	9	8	7	8	6	5	5	5	5	5	6	6	7	6	6	4	4
CS Concordia Chiajna	10	11	11	11	10	10	10	10	12	12	10	9	11	11	11	11	12	12	12	12	12	12	11	11	11	11
CSM Politehnica Iași	7	3	1	5	5	5	8	9	7	8	9	11	12	12	12	12	11	11	11	11	10	9	9	10	10	10
CS U Craiova	8	7	7	3	4	3	3	4	2	2	2	2	2	2	2	2	2	2	4	4	4	3	3	3	5	5
FC Dinamo București	2	2	2	1	1	2	4	2	4	5	5	8	6	7	6	6	6	6	6	5	5	5	7	7	7	6
CS Gaz Metan Mediaș	4	8	8	9	9	8	9	8	8	7	7	6	5	5	3	3	3	4	3	2	3	4	4	4	6	7
CS Pandurii Târgu Jiu	3	5	3	4	3	6	5	3	5	6	6	5	7	8	8	9	8	8	8	9	11	11	12	12	12	12
FCSB	6	4	4	2	2	1	1	1	1	1	1	1	1	1	1	1	1	1	1	3	2	2	2	2	2	2
ASA Târgu Mureș	13	13	13	13	13	13	13	13	13	13	13	13	13	13	13	13	14	13	13	13	13	14	14	14	14	14
FC Viitorul Constanța	5	9	9	8	8	9	7	6	6	3	3	3	3	3	4	4	4	3	2	1	1	1	1	1	1	1
FC Voluntari	9	6	6	7	7	7	6	7	9	10	11	10	9	9	9	8	9	9	10	10	9	10	10	8	9	9

== Championship play-offs ==
The top six teams from Regular season will meet twice (10 matches per team) for places in 2017–18 UEFA Champions League and 2017–18 UEFA Europa League as well as deciding the league champion. Teams start the Championship round with their points from the Regular season halved, rounded upwards, and no other records carried over from the Regular season.

=== Table ===
Pos	Team	Pld	W	D	L	GF	GA	GD	Pts	Qualification
1	Viitorul Constanța (C)	10	5	3	2	12	8	+4	44	Qualification for the Champions League third qualifying round
2	FCSB	10	6	2	2	15	7	+8	44	Qualification for the Champions League third qualifying round
3	Dinamo București	10	5	4	1	15	8	+7	40	Qualification for the Europa League third qualifying round
4	CFR Cluj (Note: CFR Cluj failed to obtain a UEFA licence after filing for insolvency in 2015.)	10	3	2	5	8	14	−6	33	
5	Universitatea Craiova	10	2	3	5	8	14	−6	31	Qualification for the Europa League third qualifying round (Note: Since the winners of 2016–17 Cupa României, Voluntari, failed to obtain a UEFA licence, the spot awarded to the cup winner (Europa League third qualifying round) was passed to the next best-placed team with a UEFA licence (in this case to the fifth-placed team) and the spot awarded to the fifth-placed team (Europa League second qualifying round) was passed down to the sixth-placed team.)
6	Astra Giurgiu	10	1	2	7	10	17	−7	27	Qualification for the Europa League second qualifying round

Source: Soccerway, Romanian Football Federation
Rules for classification: 1) Points; 2) Head-to-head points; 3) Head-to-head goal difference; 4) Head-to-head goals scored; 5) Goal difference; 6) Goals scored; 7) Matches won; 8) Play-off.
(C) Champions

=== Results ===
Home \ Away	AST	CFR	UCV	DIN	FCSB	VII
Astra Giurgiu		0–1	0–0	1–2	0–1	1–2
CFR Cluj	3–2		0–3	0–3	0–0	0–0
Universitatea Craiova	1–3	1–4		2–2	0–1	0–1
Dinamo București	1–1	2–0	0–0		2–1	2–1
FC Steaua București	3–0	2–0	3–0	2–1		1–1
Viitorul Constanța	3–2	1–0	0–1	0–0	3–1	

Source: Liga 1
Legend: Blue = home team win; Yellow = draw; Red = away team win.

=== Positions by round ===
Team ╲ Round	1	2	3	4	5	6	7	8	9	10
Astra Giurgiu	3	5	5	6	6	6	6	6	6	6
CFR Cluj	6	3	3	3	4	4	4	4	4	4
CS U Craiova	4	4	4	4	5	5	5	5	5	5
Dinamo București	5	6	6	5	3	3	3	3	3	3
FCSB	1	2	2	1	1	1	1	1	1	2
Viitorul Constanța	2	1	1	2	2	2	2	2	2	1

== Relegation play-outs ==
The bottom eight teams from regular season will meet twice (14 matches per team) to contest against relegation. Teams start the Relegation round with their points from the Regular season halved, rounded upwards, and no other records carried over from the Regular season. The winner of the Relegation round finishes 7th in the overall season standings, the second placed team - 8th, and so on, with the last placed team in the Relegation round being 14th.

=== Table ===
Pos	Team	Pld	W	D	L	GF	GA	GD	Pts	Qualification or relegation
7	CSM Politehnica Iași	14	7	7	0	16	5	+11	43	
8	Gaz Metan Mediaș	14	4	7	3	17	11	+6	39	
9	Voluntari	14	6	4	4	17	16	+1	37	
10	Botoșani	14	4	5	5	15	12	+3	33	
11	Concordia Chiajna	14	4	4	6	14	18	−4	29	
12	ACS Poli Timișoara (O)	14	5	5	4	16	14	+2	27	Qualification for the relegation play-offs
13	Pandurii Târgu Jiu (R)	14	4	5	5	12	18	−6	27	Relegation to Liga II
14	Târgu Mureș (R)	14	1	5	8	5	18	−13	14	Relegation to Liga II

Source: Soccerway
Rules for classification: 1) Points; 2) Goal difference; 3) Goals scored; 4) Matches won; 5) Play-off.
(O) Play-off winners; (R) Relegated

=== Results ===
Home \ Away	ACS	BOT	CON	IAS	GAZ	PAN	TGM	VOL
ACS Poli Timișoara		1–1	0–0	1–1	1–0	0–1	3–1	1–0
Botoșani	1–2		1–1	0–1	0–0	2–1	2–0	3–0
Concordia Chiajna	3–1	2–1		0–0	1–1	0–1	2–0	0–2
CSM Politehnica Iași	1–0	2–1	3–1		1–0	3–0	0–0	1–1
Gaz Metan Mediaș	2–2	0–0	3–0	0–2		3–1	2–0	4–1
Pandurii Târgu Jiu	1–3	1–1	3–2	0–0	0–0		1–0	1–3
Târgu Mureș	0–0	0–2	2–1	1–1	0–0	0–0		0–2
Voluntari	2–1	1–0	0–1	0–0	2–2	1–1	2–1	

Source: Liga 1
Legend: Blue = home team win; Yellow = draw; Red = away team win.

=== Positions by round ===
Team ╲ Round	1	2	3	4	5	6	7	8	9	10	11	12	13	14
ACS Poli Timișoara	13	11	12	12	11	11	11	11	11	11	11	12	12	12
Botoșani	10	9	9	9	9	9	9	10	10	9	10	10	10	10
Concordia Chiajna	11	12	13	13	13	13	13	13	12	12	12	13	13	11
CSM Politehnica Iași	8	8	8	7	7	7	7	7	7	7	7	7	7	7
Gaz Metan Mediaș	7	7	7	8	8	8	8	8	8	8	8	8	8	8
Pandurii Târgu Jiu	12	13	11	11	12	12	12	12	13	13	13	11	11	13
Târgu Mureș	14	14	14	14	14	14	14	14	14	14	14	14	14	14
Voluntari	9	10	10	10	10	10	10	9	9	10	9	9	9	9

== Promotion/relegation play-offs ==
The 12th-placed team of the Liga I faced the 3rd-placed team of the Liga II.

Team 1	Agg.	Team 2	1st leg	2nd leg
ACS Poli Timișoara	5–2	UTA Arad	2–1	3–1

12 June 2017	ACS Poli Timișoara	2–1	UTA Arad	Timișoara
20:30	Pedro Henrique 22'; Cânu 25'		Strătilă 52'	Stadium: Dan Păltinișanu; Attendance: 12,000; Referee: George Găman (Craiova)

15 June 2017	UTA Arad	1–3	ACS Poli Timișoara	Șiria
17:30	Curtuiuș 5'		Bărbuț 17'; Drăghici 21'; Pedro Henrique 88'	Stadium: Otto Greffner; Attendance: 4,000; Referee: Radu Petrescu (Bucharest)

Notes:

- ACS Poli Timișoara qualified for 2017–18 Liga I and UTA Arad qualified for 2017–18 Liga II.

== Season statistics ==
=== Top scorers ===
Updated to matches played on 5 June 2017.

Rank	Player	Club	Goals
1	(Albania) Azdren Llullaku^{1}	Gaz Metan Mediaș	16
2	(Romania) Cristian Bud	CFR Cluj	11
2	(Romania) Aurelian Chițu	Viitorul Constanța	11
2	(Slovakia) Adam Nemec	Dinamo București	11
2	(Romania) Denis Alibec	Astra Giurgiu (3) / FCSB (8)	11
2	(Romania) Andrei Cristea	CSM Politehnica Iași	11
7	(France) Harlem Gnohéré	Dinamo București (5) / FCSB (5)	10
8	(Romania) Mircea Axente^{2}	Gaz Metan Mediaș	9
8	(Brazil) Fernando Boldrin	Astra Giurgiu (1) / FCSB (8)	9
8	(Romania) Adrian Bălan	Voluntari	9
8	(Romania) Vlad Morar	ASA Târgu Mureș (4) / Viitorul Constanța (5)	9
8	(Romania) Andrei Ivan	CS U Craiova	9
8	(Romania) Sergiu Hanca	Dinamo București	9
8	(Hungary) Lukács Bőle	CSM Politehnica Iași	9
8	(Romania) George Țucudean	Pandurii Târgu Jiu (5) / Viitorul Constanța (4)	9
8	(Romania) Cătălin Golofca	Botoșani	9

^{1} Azdren Llullaku was transferred to Astana during the winter transfer window.
^{2} Mircea Axente was transferred to Al-Faisaly during the winter transfer window.

=== Hat-tricks ===
Player	For	Against	Result	Date
(France) Harlem Gnohéré	Dinamo București	Astra Giurgiu	4–1	23 July 2016
(Romania) Cristian Bud	CFR Cluj	Voluntari	5–0	17 September 2016
(Romania) Alexandru Munteanu	Gaz Metan Mediaș	Pandurii Târgu Jiu	5–2	10 December 2016
(Romania) Vlad Morar	Viitorul Constanța	ACS Poli Timișoara	5–0	25 February 2017

=== Clean sheets ===
Updated to matches played on 5 June 2017.

Rank	Player	Club	Clean sheets^{*}
1	(Romania) Florin Niță	FCSB	13
1	(Bosnia and Herzegovina) Branko Grahovac	CSM Politehnica Iași	13
3	(Romania) Silviu Lung Jr.	Astra Giurgiu	12
3	(Moldova) Nicolae Calancea	Universitatea Craiova	12
3	(Romania) Victor Rîmniceanu	Viitorul Constanța	12
6	(Romania) Cristian Bălgrădean	Concordia Chiajna	11
7	(Romania) Cătălin Straton	ACS Poli Timișoara	10
8	(Bulgaria) Plamen Iliev	Botoșani	8
9	(Romania) Mihai Mincă	CFR Cluj	7
9	(Romania) Dragoș Balauru	Voluntari	7
9	(Romania) Alexandru Greab	Gaz Metan Mediaș	7
12	(Romania) Eduard Pap	ASA Târgu Mureș	6
12	(Panama) Jaime Penedo	Dinamo București	6

^{*}Only goalkeepers who played all 90 minutes of a match are taken into consideration.

=== Discipline ===
As of 5 June 2017

==== Player ====
- Most yellow cards: 12
  - (Romania) Andrei Artean (ACS Poli Timișoara)
  - (Brazil) Júnior Morais (Astra Giurgiu)
  - (Romania) Gabriel Vașvari (Botoșani)
  - (Romania) Daniel Novac (Voluntari)
- Most red cards: 3
  - (Romania) George Miron (Botoșani)
  - (Romania) Radu Zaharia (Gaz Metan Mediaș)

==== Club ====
- Most yellow cards: 104
  - Astra Giurgiu
  - Concordia Chiajna
  - Pandurii Târgu Jiu
- Most red cards: 8
  - Politehnica Iași
  - Botoșani

== Champion squad ==
Viitorul Constanța

Goalkeepers: Alexandru Buzbuchi (8 / 0); Victor Rîmniceanu (28 / 0).
Defenders: Romario Benzar (34 / 1); Kévin Boli (Ivory Coast) (33 / 3); Cătălin Carp (Moldova) (14 / 0); Cristian Ganea (26 / 0); Robert Hodorogea (17 / 1); Bogdan Mitache (2 / 0); Sebastian Mladen (2 / 0); Sorin Rădoi (7 / 0).
Midfielders: Pablo Brandán (Argentina) (14 / 0); Carlo Casap (15 / 2); Alexandru Cicâldău (6 / 0); Florin Cioablă (1 / 0); Doru Dumitrescu (5 / 0); Ioan Filip (4 / 0); Daniel López (Spain) (12 / 0); Răzvan Marin (20 / 4); Dragoș Nedelcu (28 / 1); Florin Purece (30 / 2); Neluț Roșu (14 / 0); Florin Tănase (3 / 0); Bogdan Țîru (33 / 1); Ionuț Vînă (15 / 0).
Forwards: Aurelian Chițu (36 / 11); Andrei Ciobanu (2 / 0); Florinel Coman (28 / 6); Gabriel Iancu (24 / 5); Vlad Morar (14 / 5); Alex Nimely (Liberia) (18 / 4); Alexandru Stoica (5 / 0); George Țucudean (6 / 4).
(league appearances and goals listed in brackets)

Manager: Gheorghe Hagi.

== Awards ==
=== Liga I Team of the Season ===

Romanian Liga I Team of the 2016–17 season – Liga Profesionista de Fotbal.

Player	Team	Position
(Romania) Florin Niță	FCSB	Goalkeeper
(Romania) Romario Benzar	Viitorul	Defender
(Romania) Ionut Larie	CFR Cluj	Defender
(Ivory Coast) Kevin Boli	Viitorul	Defender
(Serbia) Marko Momčilović	FCSB	Defender
(Romania) Constantin Budescu	Astra	Midfielder
(Romania) Sergiu Hanca	Dinamo	Midfielder
(Romania) Florinel Coman	Viitorul	Midfielder
(Romania) Andrei Ivan	CSU Craiova	Forward
(Slovenia) Adam Nemec	Dinamo	Forward
(Romania) Denis Alibec	FCSB	Forward

== Monthly awards ==
Month	DigiSport Player of the Month		Reference
Month	Player	Club	Reference
August	Dorin Rotariu	Dinamo București	
September	Cristian Bud	CFR Cluj	
October	Valentin Lazăr	Dinamo București	
November	Liviu Antal	Pandurii Târgu Jiu	
December	Constantin Budescu	Astra Giurgiu	
February	Florinel Coman	Viitorul Constanța	
March	Ciprian Deac	CFR Cluj	
April	Sergiu Hanca	Dinamo București	
May	Denis Alibec	FCSB	

== Attendances ==
#	Club	Average	Highest
1	Steaua	9,389	35,000
2	Dinamo 1948	6,895	37,669
3	CFR Cluj	5,302	15,000
4	U Craiova	4,761	14,000
5	Botoșani	2,850	7,500
6	Iași	2,125	5,500
7	Viitorul	2,036	4,545
8	Astra	1,975	5,500
9	Gaz Metan	1,823	6,500
10	Timișoara	1,660	12,500
11	Târgu Mureș	1,353	5,000
12	Voluntari	991	2,837
13	Concordia	776	3,000
14	Pandurii	625	5,565
