= Aurelian Chițu =

Romanian footballer

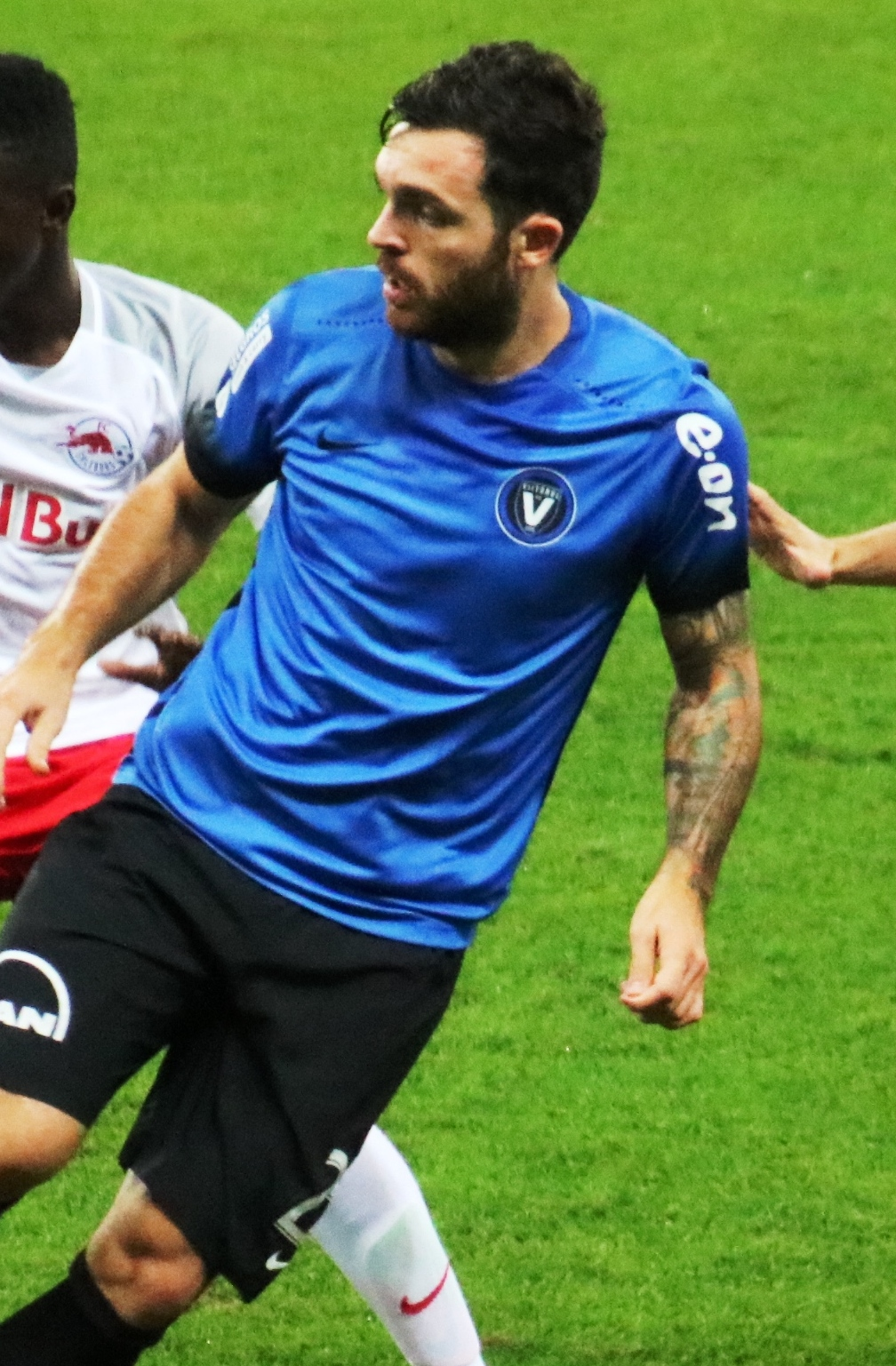
- Chițu playing for Viitorul Constanța in 2017

Personal information
- Full name: Aurelian Ionuț Chițu
- Date of birth: 25 March 1991 (age 35)
- Place of birth: Țăndărei, Romania
- Height: 1.83 m (6 ft 0 in)
- Position: Forward

Team information
- Current team: Politehnica Timișoara
- Number: 9

Youth career
- –2004: Victoria Țăndărei
- 2004–2009: Unirea Slobozia

Senior career*
Years	Team	Apps	(Gls)
2009–2013	Viitorul Constanța	109	(38)
2013–2014	Valenciennes	7	(0)
2014	→ PAS Giannina (loan)	3	(1)
2014–2015	Astra Giurgiu	11	(0)
2015–2018	Viitorul Constanța	94	(20)
2018–2020	Daejeon Citizen	57	(18)
2020–2021	Viitorul Constanța	23	(2)
2021–2022	Farul Constanța	13	(0)
2022–2024	FC U Craiova	70	(20)
2024–2026	Hermannstadt	74	(15)
2026–	Politehnica Timișoara	13	(4)

International career
2010	Romania U19	3	(0)
2012	Romania U21	2	(0)
2013	Romania	3	(0)
- * Club domestic league appearances and goals as of 9 November 2026

Aurelian Ionuț Chițu (born 25 March 1991) is a Romanian professional footballer who plays as a forward for Liga II club Politehnica Timișoara.

== Club career ==
=== Viitorul ===
In 2009, Chițu signed a contract with then Liga III club, Viitorul Constanța, helping them to promote in second tier, Liga II. In 2011, he help them to promote in the first tier of the Romanian football, Liga I. On 23 June 2012, Chițu made his debut in Liga I in a 2–2 draw with FC Brașov. In his first season in Romanian top division, he made 33 league appearances and scored 8 goals to make sure Viitorul avoid the relegation. On 5 June 2013, Chițu picked up the Digi Sport Young Player of the Year award.

=== Valenciennes ===
On 21 June 2013, Chițu signed a four-year contract with Valenciennes FC for an undisclosed fee. On 10 August, Chițu made his debut in Ligue 1 in a 3–0 win against Toulouse.

== Career statistics ==
=== Club ===
As of 9 November 2026

Appearances and goals by club, season and competition
Club	Season	League			National cup (Note: Includes Cupa României)		League cup (Note: Includes Coupe de la Ligue, Cupa Ligii)		Continental		Other		Total	
Club	Season	Division	Apps	Goals	Apps	Goals	Apps	Goals	Apps	Goals	Apps	Goals	Apps	Goals
Viitorul Constanța	2009–10	Liga III	28	19	0	0	—		—		—		28	19
Viitorul Constanța	2010–11	Liga II	23	3	1	0	—		—		—		24	3
Viitorul Constanța	2011–12	Liga II	25	8	1	0	—		—		—		26	8
Viitorul Constanța	2012–13	Liga I	33	8	0	0	—		—		—		33	8
Viitorul Constanța	Total		109	38	2	0	0	0	0	0	0	0	111	38
Valenciennes	2013–14	Ligue 1	7	0	0	0	0	0	—		—		7	0
Valenciennes	2014–15	Ligue 2	0	0	0	0	1	0	—		—		1	0
Valenciennes	Total		7	0	0	0	1	0	—		—		8	0
PAS Giannina (loan)	2013–14	Super League Greece	3	1	—		—		—		—		3	1
Astra Giurgiu	2014–15	Liga I	11	0	1	0	1	0	3 (Note: Appearance(s) in UEFA Europa League)	1	—		16	1
Viitorul Constanța	2015–16	Liga I	33	4	2	0	1	0	—		—		36	4
Viitorul Constanța	2016–17	Liga I	36	11	1	0	1	0	1	0	—		39	11
Viitorul Constanța	2017–18	Liga I	25	5	0	0	—		4 (Note: Two appearances in UEFA Champions League, two appearances in UEFA Europa League)	0	1 (Note: Appearance in Supercupa României)	0	30	5
Viitorul Constanța	Total		94	20	3	0	2	0	5	0	1	0	105	20
Daejeon Citizen	2018	K League 2	32	12	0	0	—		—		—		32	12
Daejeon Citizen	2019	K League 2	25	6	0	0	—		—		—		25	6
Daejeon Citizen	Total		57	18	0	0	—		—		—		57	18
Viitorul Constanța	2019–20	Liga I	15	0	—		—		—		—		15	0
Viitorul Constanța	2020–21	Liga I	8	2	0	0	—		—		2 (Note: Appearance in Liga I play-offs for UEFA Europa Conference League)	0	10	2
Viitorul Constanța	Total		23	2	0	0	—		—		2	0	25	2
Farul Constanța	2021–22	Liga I	13	0	1	0	—		—		—		14	0
FC U Craiova	2022–23	Liga I	33	10	4	1	—		—		2 (Note: Appearance in Liga I European play-offs)	2	39	13
FC U Craiova	2023–24	Liga I	37	10	4	0	—		—		—		41	10
FC U Craiova	Total		70	20	8	1	—		—		2	2	80	23
Hermannstadt	2024–25	Liga I	39	6	6	1	—		—		—		45	7
Hermannstadt	2025–26	Liga I	35	9	3	0	—		—		2 (Note: Appearances in Liga I promotion/relegation play-offs)	0	40	9
Hermannstadt	Total		74	15	9	1	—		—		2	0	85	16
Politehnica Timișoara	2026–27	Liga II	13	4	2	1	—		—		—		15	5
Career total			474	118	26	3	4	0	8	1	7	2	519	124

=== International ===
Appearances and goals by national team and year
National team	Year	Apps	Goals
Romania
Romania	2013	3	0
Total		3	0

== Honours ==
Viitorul Constanța

- Liga I: 2016–17
- Liga III: 2009–10
- Supercupa României runner-up: 2017

Hermannstadt

- Cupa României runner-up: 2024–25

Individual

- Digi Sport Young Player of the Year: 2012–13
- Gazeta Sporturilor Romania Player of the Month: August 2023
