= Marian Aioani =

Romanian footballer (born 1999)

Personal information
- Full name: Marian Mihai Aioani
- Date of birth: 7 November 1999 (age 27)
- Place of birth: Buftea, Romania
- Height: 1.86 m (6 ft 1 in)
- Position: Goalkeeper

Team information
- Current team: Rapid București
- Number: 16

Youth career
- Libertatea Urziceanca
- –2016: Chindia Târgoviște

Senior career*
Years	Team	Apps	(Gls)
2016–2021	Chindia Târgoviște	118	(0)
2021–2024	Farul Constanța	94	(0)
2024–	Rapid București	78	(0)

International career^{‡}
2018–2019	Romania U19	3	(0)
2019–2021	Romania U21	2	(0)
2021	Romania Olympic	7	(0)
2026–	Romania	2	(0)
- * Club domestic league appearances and goals as of 7 November 2026 ‡ National team caps and goals as of 2 June 2026

Marian Mihai Aioani (born 7 November 1999) is a Romanian professional footballer who plays as a goalkeeper for Liga I club Rapid București and the Romania national team.

Aioani started out as a senior at Chindia Târgoviște in 2016, aged 16, and amassed over 60 matches in the first division before moving to Farul Constanța in 2021. With the latter, he won a national title in his second season at the club.

Internationally, Aioani represented Romania at under-19, under-21, and under-23 levels, being selected in the squads for the UEFA Under-21 Euro 2021 and the 2020 Summer Olympics.

== Early life ==
Aioani was born in Buftea, a town located 20 km north-west of Bucharest, and grew up supporting Dinamo București.

== Club career ==
=== Chindia Târgoviște ===
Aioani started his senior career with Chindia Târgoviște on 9 March 2016, at age 16, recording his debut in a 7–0 Liga II thrashing of CSM Metalul Reșița. He became an undisputed starter in the 2018–19 campaign, as his side achieved promotion to the Liga I by winning the second division.

Aioani's first match in the former competition came on 15 July 2019, playing the full 90 minutes in a 2–2 away draw with Gaz Metan Mediaș.

=== Farul Constanța ===
On 22 June 2021, Aioani agreed to a four-year contract with fellow Liga I team Farul Constanța, being part in a swap deal which took several players in the other direction. (Note: As compensation for the signing of Aioani, Farul Constanța players Paul Iacob, Marco Dulca, Tiberiu Căpușă, and Cătălin Căbuz joined Chindia Târgoviște on full transfers.)

In the 2022–23 campaign, Aioani made 39 league appearances to help Farul in winning the national title. He had the most clean sheets (13, shared with Mihai Popa) and was named in the Liga I Team of the Season. On 12 July 2023, he made his debut in European competitions by playing in a 1–0 home win over Sheriff Tiraspol in the UEFA Champions League first qualifying round.

=== Rapid București ===
On 23 January 2024, it was announced that Aioani joined Rapid București on a three-and-a-half-year deal for a rumoured fee of €400,000 plus 20% interest on a future sale. Four days later, he made his debut in a 2–1 league derby win over Dinamo București.

== International career ==
Aioani was selected by manager Adrian Mutu in the Romania squad for the 2021 UEFA European Under-21 Championship, but did not make any appearance as his nation exited the tournament in the group stage. He was then called up to the postponed 2020 Summer Olympics, this time starting in all three matches of another group-stage exit.

== Career statistics ==
As of match played 7 November 2026

Appearances and goals by club, season and competition
Club	Season	League			Cupa României		Europe		Other		Total	
Club	Season	Division	Apps	Goals	Apps	Goals	Apps	Goals	Apps	Goals	Apps	Goals
Chindia Târgoviște	2015–16	Liga II	4	0	0	0	—		—		4	0
Chindia Târgoviște	2016–17	Liga II	7	0	0	0	—		—		7	0
Chindia Târgoviște	2017–18	Liga II	10	0	0	0	—		2 (Note: Appearances in Liga I promotion/relegation play-offs)	0	12	0
Chindia Târgoviște	2018–19	Liga II	35	0	0	0	—		—		35	0
Chindia Târgoviște	2019–20	Liga I	30	0	1	0	—		2	0	33	0
Chindia Târgoviște	2020–21	Liga I	32	0	0	0	—		1 (Note: Appearance in Liga I European play-offs)	0	33	0
Chindia Târgoviște	Total		118	0	1	0	—		5	0	124	0
Farul Constanța	2021–22	Liga I	37	0	0	0	—		—		37	0
Farul Constanța	2022–23	Liga I	39	0	0	0	—		—		39	0
Farul Constanța	2023–24	Liga I	18	0	0	0	8 (Note: Two appearances in UEFA Champions League, six appearances in UEFA Europa Conference League)	0	1 (Note: Appearance in Supercupa României)	0	27	0
Farul Constanța	Total		94	0	0	0	8	0	1	0	103	0
Rapid București	2023–24	Liga I	14	0	—		—		—		14	0
Rapid București	2024–25	Liga I	23	0	4	0	—		—		27	0
Rapid București	2025–26	Liga I	32	0	2	0	—		—		34	0
Rapid București	2026–27	Liga I	9	0	2	0	—		—		11	0
Rapid București	Total		78	0	8	0	—		—		86	0
Career total			290	0	9	0	8	0	6	0	313	0

=== International ===
As of match played 2 June 2026.

Appearances and goals by national team and year
National team	Year	Apps	Goals
Romania
Romania	2026	2	0
Total		2	0

== Honours ==
Chindia Târgoviște

- Liga II: 2018–19

Farul Constanța

- Liga I: 2022–23
- Supercupa României runner-up: 2023

Individual

- Liga I Team of the Season: 2022–23
- Liga I Most Clean Sheets: 2022–23 (shared with Mihai Popa)
