= Josemi Castañeda =

Spanish footballer

Personal information
- Full name: José Miguel Castañeda Macho
- Date of birth: 26 February 1998 (age 28)
- Place of birth: Suances, Spain
- Height: 1.73 m (5 ft 8 in)
- Position: Midfielder

Team information
- Current team: Terrassa
- Number: 15

Youth career
- –2008: SD Amistad
- 2008–2016: Racing Santander

Senior career*
Years	Team	Apps	(Gls)
2016–2017	Racing B	26	(1)
2016	Racing Santander	1	(0)
2017–2020	Las Palmas B	74	(1)
2020	Las Palmas	3	(0)
2020–2021	Viitorul Constanța	6	(0)
2021–2022	Farul II Constanța	13	(5)
2022–2024	Gimnástica Torrelavega	46	(1)
2024–2025	SD Logroñés	28	(0)
2025–	Terrassa	2	(0)
- * Club domestic league appearances and goals as of 28 September 2025

José Miguel "Josemi" Castañeda Macho (born 26 February 1998) is a Spanish professional footballer who plays as a central midfielder for Segunda Federación club Terrassa.

== Club career ==
Born in Suances, Cantabria, Castañeda joined Racing de Santander's youth academy in 2008, from SD Amistad. He made his senior debut with the reserves on 21 August 2016, starting in a 5–1 Tercera División home rout of Selaya FC.

Castañeda scored his first senior goal on 12 October 2016, opening in a 3–4 away loss against CF Vimenor. He played his first competitive match with the first team on 20 November, coming on as a second-half substitute for Sergio Ruiz in a 0–0 home draw with Arandina CF in the Segunda División B.

On 10 July 2017, Castañeda signed with UD Las Palmas and was assigned to the B side in the third division. On 17 June 2020, he made his professional debut by replacing Slavoljub Srnić in a 1–0 Segunda División away victory over UD Almería.

On 1 September 2020, Castañeda agreed to a three-year contract with Romanian Liga I club FC Viitorul Constanța.
