= Ramon Gașpar =

Romanian footballer

Personal information
- Full name: Dobrin Ramon Gașpar
- Date of birth: 2 February 2003 (age 23)
- Place of birth: Mediaș, Romania
- Height: 1.77 m (5 ft 10 in)
- Position: Midfielder

Youth career
- 2017–2021: Cork City

Senior career*
Years	Team	Apps	(Gls)
2021–2022	Gaz Metan Mediaș	16	(1)
2022–2024	Argeș Pitești	0	(0)
2023	→ CSM Focșani (loan)		
2023–2024	→ Jiul Petroșani (loan)	13	(3)
2024	Viitorul Târgu Jiu	6	(0)

International career
2022	Romania U20	1	(0)
- * Club domestic league appearances and goals as of 21 September 2024

Dobrin Ramon Gașpar (born 2 February 2003) is a Romanian professional footballer who plays as a midfielder.

== Career ==
In 2021, Gașpar signed for Romanian top flight side Gaz Metan Mediaș from the youth academy of Cork City in the Republic of Ireland. On 25 July 2021, he debuted for Gaz Metan Mediaș during a 2–0 loss to Farul Constanța.

== Personal life ==
Gașpar is named Dobrin after the former Argeș Pitești star player Nicolae Dobrin.
