= Alexandru Georgescu =

Romanian footballer

Personal information
- Full name: Alexandru Gabriel Georgescu
- Date of birth: 10 July 2001 (age 25)
- Place of birth: Slatina, Romania
- Height: 1.75 m (5 ft 9 in)
- Position: Right back

Team information
- Current team: CSM Slatina
- Number: 80

Youth career
- –2016: CSŞ Slatina
- 2016–2020: Gheorghe Hagi Academy

Senior career*
Years	Team	Apps	(Gls)
2020–2021	Viitorul Constanța	2	(0)
2021–2025	Farul Constanța	1	(0)
2021–2022	Farul II Constanța		
2022–2023	→ Gloria Bistrița-Năsăud (loan)	25	(1)
2023–2024	→ Sporting Roșiori (loan)	11	(1)
2024	→ Cetatea Turnu Măgurele (loan)		
2025	Dunărea Călărași		
2026–	CSM Slatina	12	(1)

International career
2017–2018	Romania U17	8	(0)
2018	Romania U18	3	(0)
2021	Romania U21	1	(0)
- * Club domestic league appearances and goals as of 1 November 2026

Alexandru Gabriel Georgescu (born 10 July 2001) is a Romanian professional footballer who plays as a right back for Liga II club CSM Slatina.
