= Florin Purece =

Romanian footballer

Personal information
- Full name: Florin Flavius Purece
- Date of birth: 6 November 1991 (age 35)
- Place of birth: Arad, Romania
- Height: 1.82 m (6 ft 0 in)
- Positions: Attacking midfielder; winger

Team information
- Current team: Metaloglobus București
- Number: 10

Youth career
- 2002–2009: Atletico Arad
- 2009: Nottingham Forest

Senior career*
Years	Team	Apps	(Gls)
2009–2013	UTA Arad	62	(8)
2012–2013	→ Concordia Chiajna (loan)	27	(2)
2013–2016	Concordia Chiajna	94	(11)
2016–2017	Viitorul Constanța	30	(2)
2017–2018	Hapoel Ra'anana	6	(0)
2018–2020	Bruk-Bet Termalica	63	(10)
2020–2021	Sepsi OSK	20	(1)
2021–2022	Farul Constanța	27	(1)
2022–2023	Universitatea Cluj	14	(0)
2023–2024	Bruk-Bet Termalica	11	(1)
2024–2025	Unirea Slobozia	68	(11)
2026–	Metaloglobus București	26	(7)

International career
2010	Romania U19	3	(0)
- * Club domestic league appearances and goals as of 31 October 2026

Florin Flavius Purece (born 6 November 1991) is a Romanian professional footballer who plays as a midfielder for Liga II club Metaloglobus București.

== Career ==
In 2012, Purece was sent on loan to Concordia Chiajna.

== Career statistics ==
As of match played 31 October 2026

Appearances and goals by club, season and competition
Club	Season	League			National cup (Note: Includes Cupa României, Polish Cup)		League cup (Note: Includes Cupa Ligii, Toto Cup)		Europe		Other		Total	
Club	Season	Division	Apps	Goals	Apps	Goals	Apps	Goals	Apps	Goals	Apps	Goals	Apps	Goals
UTA Arad	2009–10	Liga II	10	0			—		—		—		10	0
UTA Arad	2010–11	Liga II	25	2			—		—		—		25	2
UTA Arad	2011–12	Liga II	27	6			—		—		—		27	6
UTA Arad	Total		62	8			—		—		—		62	8
Concordia Chiajna (loan)	2012–13	Liga I	27	2	2	1	—		—		—		29	3
Concordia Chiajna	2013–14	Liga I	29	3	1	0	—		—		—		30	3
Concordia Chiajna	2014–15	Liga I	29	5	0	0	0	0	—		—		29	5
Concordia Chiajna	2015–16	Liga I	36	3	2	1	3	1	—		—		41	5
Concordia Chiajna	Total		121	13	5	2	3	1	—		—		129	16
Viitorul Constanța	2016–17	Liga I	30	2	3	1	1	0	1 (Note: Appearance in UEFA Europa League)	0	—		35	3
Hapoel Ra'anana	2017–18	Israeli Premier League	6	0	0	0	1	0	—		—		7	0
Termalica Nieciecza	2017–18	Ekstraklasa	6	0	0	0	—		—		—		6	0
Termalica Nieciecza	2018–19	I liga	25	6	3	0	—		—		—		29	6
Termalica Nieciecza	2019–20	I liga	32	4	1	0	—		—		—		33	4
Termalica Nieciecza	Total		63	10	4	0	—		—		—		67	10
Sepsi OSK	2020–21	Liga I	20	1	1	0	—		—		—		13	1
Farul Constanța	2021–22	Liga I	27	1	0	0	—		—		—		27	1
Universitatea Cluj	2022–23	Liga I	14	0	2	0	—		—		—		16	0
Bruk-Bet Termalica	2022–23	I liga	2	0	—		—		—		—		2	0
Bruk-Bet Termalica	2023–24	I liga	9	1	1	0	—		—		—		10	1
Bruk-Bet Termalica	Total		11	1	1	0	—		—		—		12	1
Unirea Slobozia	2023–24	Liga II	14	4	—		—		—		—		14	4
Unirea Slobozia	2024–25	Liga I	35	4	0	0	—		—		2 (Note: Appearance in Liga I promotion/relegation play-offs)	0	37	4
Unirea Slobozia	2025–26	Liga I	19	3	0	0	—		—		—		19	3
Unirea Slobozia	Total		68	11	0	0	—		—		2	0	70	11
Metaloglobus București	2025–26	Liga I	14	4	0	0	—		—		—		14	4
Metaloglobus București	2026–27	Liga II	12	3	0	0	—		—		—		12	3
Metaloglobus București	Total		26	7	0	0	—		—		—		26	7
Career total			448	54	16	3	5	1	1	0	2	0	472	58

== Honours ==
Viitorul Constanța

- Liga I: 2016–17

Unirea Slobozia

- Liga II: 2023–24
