= Central Stadium (Gheorghe Hagi Academy) =

Sports stadium in Ovidiu, Romania

Central Stadium of the Gheorghe Hagi Football Academy
- Ovidiu
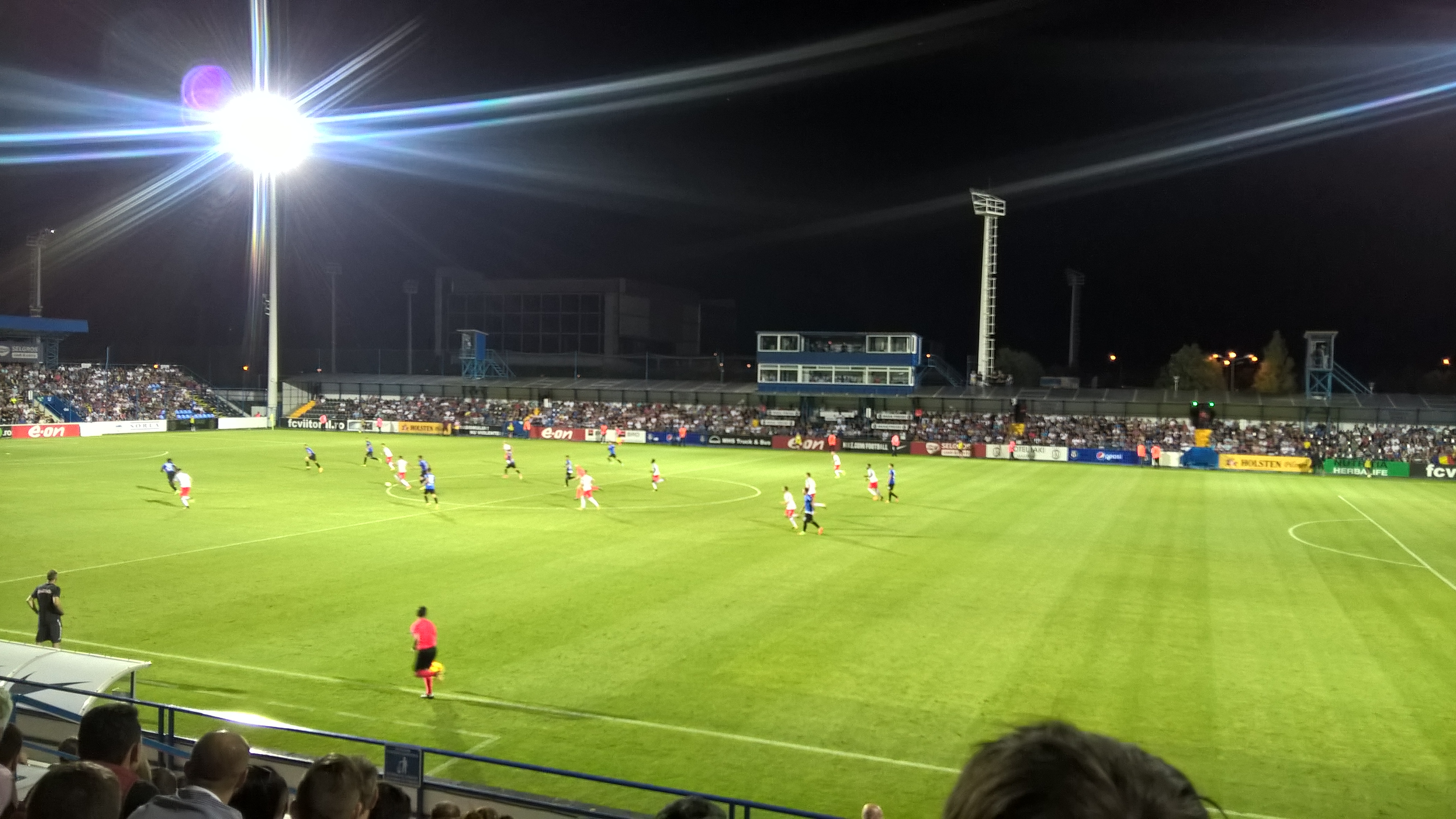
- Interactive map of Central Stadium of the Gheorghe Hagi Football Academy
- Address: Str. Academiei, nr. 3
- Location: Ovidiu, Romania
- Coordinates: 44°14′10″N 28°33′56.3″E
- Owner: Gheorghe Hagi
- Operator: Farul Constanța
- Capacity: 4,554 seated
- Surface: Grass
- Field size: 105 m × 68 m (344 ft × 223 ft)

Construction
- Opened: 2015

Tenants
- Viitorul Constanța (2015–2021); Farul Constanța (2021–present)

The Central Stadium of the Gheorghe Hagi Football Academy is a multi-purpose stadium in Ovidiu, Romania. It is currently used mostly for football matches and is the home ground of Farul Constanța. Before 2021, the stadium was the home ground of Viitorul Constanța. The stadium holds 4,554 people.

== Events ==
=== Association football ===
International football matches
Date	Rival	Home	Away	Score	Attendance
5 September 2017	2019 UEFA Euro U-21 qualification	Romania	Switzerland	1 - 1	1,621
10 November 2017	2019 UEFA Euro U-21 qualification	Romania	Portugal	1 - 1	2,553

=== Association football ===
International football clubs matches
Date	Competition	Home	Away	Score	Attendance
5 Sep 2015	Friendly	(Romania) Viitorul	(Bulgaria) Cherno More Varna	0 - 2	
21 October 2015	UEFA Youth League	(Romania) Viitorul	(Belarus) Minsk	5 - 1	924
25 November 2015	UEFA Youth League	(Romania) Viitorul	(Czech Republic) Příbram	0 - 0	200
4 August 2016	UEFA Europa League	(Romania) Viitorul	(Belgium) Gent	0 - 0	1,294
28 September 2016	UEFA Youth League	(Romania) Viitorul	(Moldova) Sheriff Tiraspol	4 - 1	270
2 November 2016	UEFA Youth League	(Romania) Viitorul	(Switzerland) Zürich	5 - 0	500
8 February 2017	UEFA Youth League	(Romania) Viitorul	(Denmark) Copenhagen	4 - 2	200
26 July 2017	UEFA Champions League	(Romania) Viitorul	(Cyprus) APOEL	1 - 0	3,873
17 August 2017	UEFA Europa League	(Romania) Viitorul	(Austria) Salzburg	1 - 3	3,338
19 July 2018	UEFA Europa League	(Romania) Viitorul	(Luxembourg) Racing FC	0 - 0	2,130
26 July 2018	UEFA Europa League	(Romania) Viitorul	(Netherlands) Vitesse	2 - 2	2,543
1 Grand 2019	UEFA Europa League	(Romania) Viitorul	(Belgium) Gent	2 - 1	4,008
