= 2024–25 FCV Farul Constanța season =

FCV Farul Constanța
2024–25 season
- Owner: Gheorghe Hagi
- Manager: Gheorghe Hagi
- Stadium: Central Stadium
- Liga I: 9th
- Cupa României: Pre-season
- Highest home attendance: 4,080
- Average home league attendance: 2,734
- Biggest win: Farul Constanța 2–0 Politehnica Iași
Home colours	Away colours	Third colours

The 2024–25 season is the 125th season in the history of FCV Farul Constanța, and the club's 13th consecutive season in Liga I. In addition to the domestic league, the team is scheduled to participate in the Cupa României.

== Transfers ==
=== In ===
Pos.	Player	Transferred to	Fee	Date	Source
GK	(Romania) Răzvan Ducan	(Romania) Botoșani	Free	1 July 2024	
MF	(Romania) Andrei Ciobanu	(Romania) Voluntari	Free	1 July 2024	
DF	(Romania) Mihai Bălașa	(Romania) Sepsi OSK	Free	1 July 2024	
FW	(Romania) Gabriel Iancu	(Romania) FC Hermannstadt	Free	1 July 2024	
MF	(Romania) Eduard Radaslavescu	(Romania) FCSB	Free	9 July 2024	
MF	(Romania) Victor Dican	(Romania) Botoșani	Free	11 July 2024	

=== Out ===
Pos.	Player	Transferred to	Fee	Date	Source
FW	(Romania) Louis Munteanu	(Italy) ACF Fiorentina	Loan return	30 June 2024	
MF	(Belgium) Amine Benchaib		Contract termination	1 July 2024	
DF	(Ivory Coast) Kevin Boli		Contract termination	1 July 2024	
MF	(Romania) Tudor Băluţă	(Poland) Śląsk Wrocław	End of contract	1 July 2024	
FW	(Romania) Ștefan Bodișteanu	(Romania) Botoșani	Undisclosed	10 July 2024	

== Friendlies ==
=== Pre-season ===
21 June 2024 Friendly	Farul Constanța (Romania)	0–1	(Bulgaria) Cherno More	Ovidiu
18:00 UTC+3			Isa 38'	Stadium: Central Stadium

26 June 2024 Friendly	Farul Constanța (Romania)	5–3	(Moldova) Zimbru Chișinău

29 June 2024 Friendly	Farul Constanța (Romania)	1–2	(Moldova) Petrocub Hîncești
	Stoian 70'		Plătică 32'; Jardan 35'

3 July 2024 Friendly	Farul Constanța (Romania)	1–5	(Moldova) Petrocub Hîncești
	Casap 15' (pen.)		Mudrac 7'; Plătică 8', 51'; Lungu 54' (pen.); Demian 87'

6 July 2024 Friendly	Farul Constanța (Romania)	3–0	(Romania) CSA Steaua Bucureşti
16:00	Grigoryan 36'; Cocoş 80'; Doicaru 89'

== Competitions ==
=== Overall record ===
Competition	First match	Last match	Starting round	Record							
Competition	First match	Last match	Starting round	Pld	W	D	L	GF	GA	GD	Win %
Liga I	12 July 2024		Matchday 1	5	1	1	3	4	5	−1	20.00
Cupa României				0	0	0	0	0	0	+0	—
Total				5	1	1	3	4	5	−1	20.00

Last updated: 9 August 2024
Source: Soccerway

=== Liga I ===
==== League table ====
Pos	Team	Pld	W	D	L	GF	GA	GD	Pts	Advances
8	Hermannstadt	30	11	8	11	34	40	−6	41 (Note: Ranked on head-to-head goal difference: Sepsi (+3); Hermannstadt (-3).)	Qualification for play-out round
9	Petrolul Ploiești	30	9	13	8	29	29	0	40	Qualification for play-out round
10	Farul Constanța	30	8	11	11	29	38	−9	35	Qualification for play-out round
11	UTA Arad	30	8	10	12	28	35	−7	34	Qualification for play-out round
12	Oțelul Galați	30	7	11	12	24	32	−8	32	Qualification for play-out round

Source: LPF (in Romanian)
Rules for classification: 1) Points; 2) Head-to-head points; 3) Head-to-head goal difference; 4) Head-to-head goals scored; 5) Goal difference; 6) Goals scored; 7) Play-off.

==== Results summary ====
Overall								Home						Away					
Pld	W	D	L	GF	GA	GD	Pts	W	D	L	GF	GA	GD	W	D	L	GF	GA	GD
5	1	1	3	4	5	−1	4	1	0	2	2	2	0	0	1	1	2	3	−1

Last updated: 9 August 2024.

==== Results by round ====
Round	1	2	3	4	5
Ground	H	A	H	H	A
Result	L	D	L	W	L
Position	16	12			

Updated to match(es) played on 9 August 2024. Source:
A = Away; H = Home; W = Win; D = Draw; L = Loss

==== Matches ====
The match schedule was released on 1 July 2024.

12 July 2024 1	Farul Constanța	0–1	Unirea Slobozia	Constanța
18:30 UTC+3	Rivaldinho (yellow card) 17'; Vînă (yellow card) 43'		Purece 19'; Perianu (yellow card) 21'; Camara (yellow card) 64'; Toma (yellow card) 90+4'	Stadium: Central Stadium; Attendance: 2,000; Referee: Andrei Moroiță

22 July 2024 2	Oțelul Galați	0–0	Farul Constanța	Galați
22:00 UTC+3	Cissé (yellow card) 90+2'			Stadium: Oțelul Stadium; Referee: Radu Petrescu

28 July 2024 3	Farul Constanța	0–1	Botoșani	Constanța
19:00 UTC+3	Popescu (yellow card) 41'		Bodișteanu (yellow card) 8', (goal) 47'; Friday (red card) 56'; Șeroni (yellow card) 61'; Pavlovič (yellow card) 82'; Pap (yellow card) 90+8'	Stadium: Central Stadium; Referee: Flueran Viorel Nicusor

3 August 2024 4	Farul Constanța	2–0	Politehnica Iași	Constanța
19:00 UTC+3	Rivaldinho 34'; Iancu 45+11'			Stadium: Central Stadium; Referee: Horia Gabriel Mladinovici

9 August 2024 5	FCSB	3–2	Farul Constanța	Bucharest
21:00				Stadium: Arena Națională; Referee: István Kovács

19 August 2024 6	Farul Constanța	v	Hermannstadt	Constanța
22:00 UTC+3				Stadium: Central Stadium
