= 2023 Supercupa României =

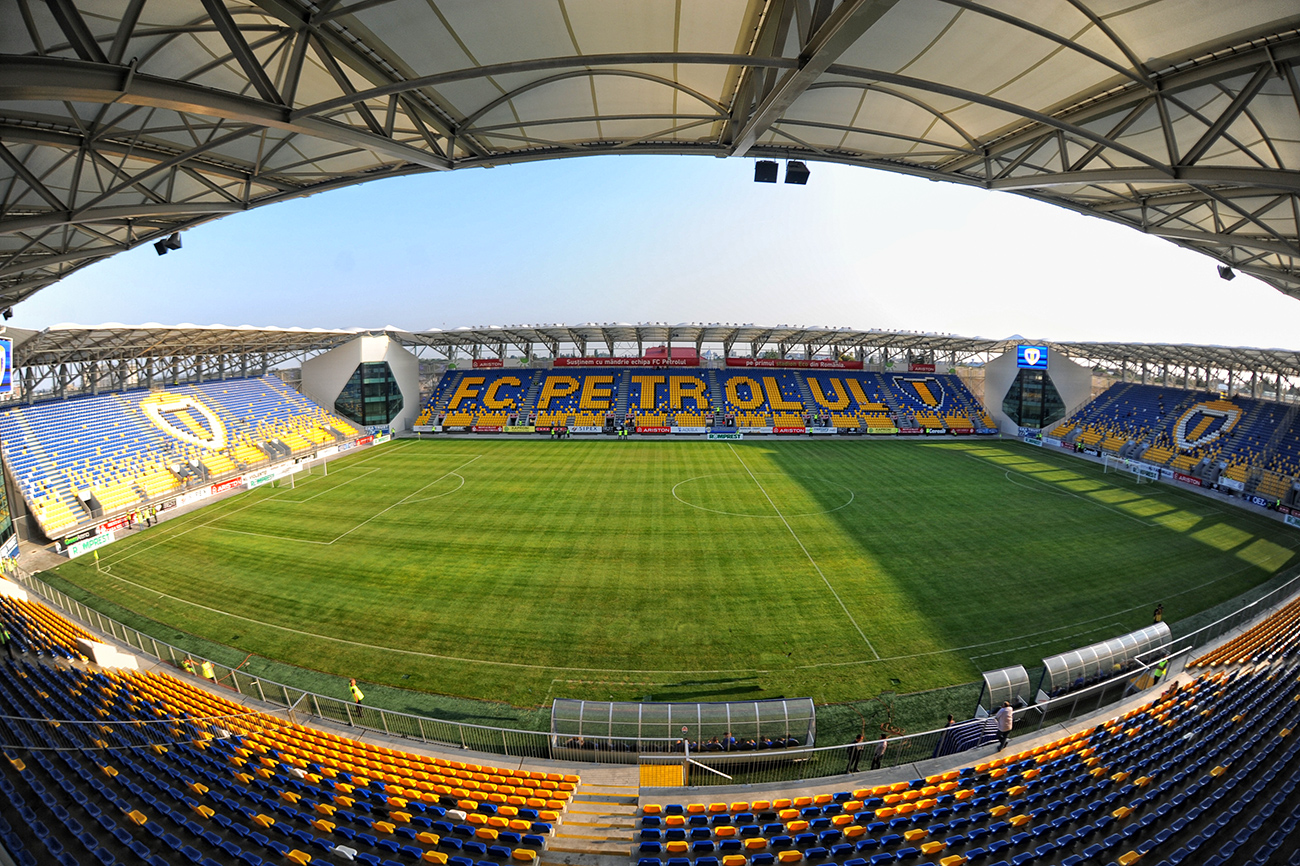
- The Ilie Oană Stadium in Ploiești hosted the match
- Event: 2023 Supercupa României
| Farul Constanța | Sepsi OSK |
| Liga I | Cupa României |
| 0 | 1 |
- Date: 8 July 2023
- Venue: Stadionul Ilie Oană, Ploiești
- Referee: Andrei Chivulete
- Attendance: 7.063

The 2023 Supercupa României was the 25th edition of the Supercupa României, an annual football super cup contested by the winners of the previous season's Liga I and Cupa României competitions.

The game featured Farul Constanța and Sepsi OSK, with the Stadionul Ilie Oană in Ploiești hosting the competition for the third time. Sepsi OSK claimed its second supercup.

== Teams ==
| Team | Qualification | Previous participations (bold indicates winners) |
|---|---|---|
| Farul Constanța | Winners of the 2022–23 Liga I | None |
| Sepsi OSK | Winners of the 2022–23 Cupa României | 1 **(2022)** |

== Match ==
=== Details ===
8 July 2023
20:00 EEST (UTC+03)

| Farul Constanța | 0–1 | Sepsi OSK |
|---|---|---|
| | Report 1 Report 2 Report 3 | Gheorghe 47' |

Stadionul Ilie Oană, Ploiești
Attendance: 7.063
Referee: Andrei Chivulete

| **Farul Constanța** | **Sepsi OSK** |

| GK | 12 | (Romania) Mihai Aioani |
| RB | 25 | (Benin) David Kiki | | (substituted off) 46' |
| CB | 5 | (Portugal) Diogo Queirós | | (substituted off) 62' |
| CB | 21 | (Ivory Coast) Kevin Boli | (yellow card) 36' |
| LB | 27 | (Romania) Andrei Borza |
| RCM | 18 | (Romania) Andrei Artean |
| CM | 16 | (Romania) Dragoș Nedelcu |
| LCM | 8 | (Romania) Ionuț Vînă | (yellow card) 25' | (substituted off) 46' |
| RW | 26 | (Romania) Adrian Mazilu | | (substituted off) 71' |
| CF | 7 | (Romania) Denis Alibec |
| LW | 77 | (Romania) Enes Sali | | (substituted off) 62' |
Substitutes:
| GK | 1 | (Romania) Alexandru Buzbuchi |
| RB | 22 | (Romania) Dan Sîrbu | | (substituted on) 46' |
| CB | 3 | (Romania) Mihai Popescu | | (substituted on) 62' |
| LB | 13 | (Portugal) Fábio Vianna |
| MF | 4 | (Ivory Coast) Kevin Doukouré |
| MF | 80 | (Romania) Nicolas Popescu |
| LW | 10 | (Argentina) Marco Borgnino | (yellow card) 64' | (substituted on) 46' |
| FW | 9 | (Brazil) Rivaldinho | | (substituted on) 62' |
| RW | 29 | (Romania) Valentin Dumitrache | | (substituted on) 71' |
Manager:
(Romania) Gheorghe Hagi

| GK | 33 | (Romania) Roland Niczuly | (yellow card) 90' |
| RB | 13 | (Romania) Denis Ciobotariu |
| CB | 44 | (Romania) Mihai Bălașa | (yellow card) 58' |
| CB | 82 | (Slovakia) Branislav Niňaj |
| LB | 25 | (Romania) Bogdan Oteliță | | (substituted off) 69' |
| DM | 5 | (Argentina) Jonathan Rodríguez |
| DM | 6 | (Romania) Nicolae Păun |
| RM | 11 | (Romania) Marius Ștefănescu | | (substituted off) 85' |
| CM | 10 | (Romania) Cosmin Matei | | (substituted off) 79' |
| LM | 8 | (Romania) Ion Gheorghe | | (substituted off) 70' |
| CF | 18 | (Slovakia) Pavol Šafranko | (yellow card) 68' | (substituted off) 76' |
Substitutes:
| GK | 1 | (Romania) Dinu Moldovan |
| LB | 17 | (Romania) Darius Oroian | | (substituted on) 69' |
| CB | 4 | (Hungary) Márk Tamás |
| RB | 20 | (Romania) Andres Dumitrescu | | (substituted on) 70' |
| CM | 59 | (Albania) Sherif Kallaku |
| CM | 77 | (Croatia) Adnan Aganović | | (substituted on) 79' |
| CF | 9 | (Moldova) Vitalie Damașcan | | (substituted on) 85' |
| CF | 99 | (Venezuela) Mario Rondón | (yellow card) 82' | (substituted on) 79' |
| FW | 97 | (Hungary) Roland Varga |
Manager:
(Romania) Liviu Ciobotariu

**MAN OF THE MATCH**

**MATCH OFFICIALS**

- Assistant referees:
  - Ferencz Tunyogi
  - Constantinescu Andrei
- Fourth official:
  - Sebastian Colţescu
- Additional assistant referees:

**MATCH RULES**

- 90 minutes.
- Penalty shoot-out if scores still level.
- Nine named substitutes.
- Maximum of five substitutions.

== See also ==
- 2023–24 Liga I
- 2023–24 Cupa României
