= 2019–20 FC Viitorul Constanța season =

Football season in Romania Liga I

Viitorul Constanța
2019–20 season
- Manager: Gheorghe Hagi(until 2 August); Cătălin Anghel (from 2 August)
- Stadium: Stadionul Viitorul (Ovidiu)
- Liga I: 7th
- Cupa României: Round of 32
- Supercupa României: Winners
- Europa League: Second qualifying round
- Top goalscorer: League: Gabriel Iancu (18); All: Gabriel Iancu (20)
Home colours	Away colours	Third colours

The 2019–20 season was the 11th season in Viitorul Constanța's history, and the 8th in the top-flight of Romanian football. Viitorul competed in Liga I and in the Cupa României.

== Previous season positions ==
	Competition	Position
(European Union)	UEFA Europa League	Second qualifying round
(Romania)	Liga I	3rd
(Romania)	Cupa României	Winner

== Season overview ==
=== June ===
On 1 June, FC Viitorul Constanța appointed Gheorghe Popescu as the new Executive President of the team. He was presented in a press conference alongside the owner of the club, Gheorghe Hagi.

=== July ===
11 players trained at the Gheorghe Hagi Academy and FC Viitorul Constanța were called up to the Romania national under-21 football team, who were semi-finalists at the 2019 UEFA European Under-21 Championship in Italy and San Marino, held this summer.

On 12 July Ianis Hagi, the captain of FC Viitorul Constanța at the time, signed for Belgian club K.R.C. Genk for a reported fee of €8 million.

=== October ===
On 19 October, Gheorghe Hagi Football Academy announced the separation from Lucian Burchel.

On 27 October Louis Munteanu was the 39th player from the Gheorghe Hagi Football Academy to be promoted to Liga 1.

=== November ===
On 29 November the Gheorghe Hagi Football Academy and FC Viitorul Constanța signed a partnership with CS Năvodari, a fellow professional Romanian club playing in Liga IV.

=== December ===
On 6 December, Gheorghe Hagi Football Academy signed a partnership with AVA Football Academy London, the first ever international partnership for the Gheorghe Hagi Football Academy.

=== January ===
On 5 January, FC Viitorul Constanța announced the separation from George Ogăraru.

On 15 January the Gheorghe Hagi Football Academy signed a partnership with LPS Bihorul Oradea.

=== February ===
On 5 February Bogdan Țîru, the captain of FC Viitorul Constanța at the time, signed for Polish club Jagiellonia Białystok for a reported fee of €600,000.

=== June ===
On 16 June Darius Grosu was the 40th player from the Gheorghe Hagi Football Academy to be promoted to Liga 1.

=== July ===
On 25 July Alexandru Georgescu was the 41st player from the Gheorghe Hagi Football Academy to be promoted to Liga 1.

On 27 July the Gheorghe Hagi Football Academy signed a partnership with iSport Vâlcea.

On 29 July Ștefan Bodișteanu was the 42nd player from the Gheorghe Hagi Football Academy to be promoted to Liga 1.

=== August ===
On 1 August Bogdan Lazăr was the 43rd player from the Gheorghe Hagi Football Academy to be promoted to Liga 1.

On 2 August, FC Viitorul Constanța announced the separation from Gheorghe Hagi, the manager of FC Viitorul Constanța at the time.

On 5 August Luca Andronache was the 44th player from the Gheorghe Hagi Football Academy to be promoted to Liga 1.

Gabriel Iancu ended the 2019–20 season as the top scorer of the league championship.

== Club officials ==
=== Management ===
Role	Name
Owner	(Romania) Gheorghe Hagi
President	(Romania) Pavel Peniu
Vice-President	(Romania) Neculai Tănasă
Executive President	(Romania) Gheorghe Popescu
Administrator	(Romania) Zoltán Iasko
General Director	(Romania) Cristian Bivolaru
Economic Director	(Romania) Gheorghe Mega
Director of Scouting	(Romania) George Ogăraru
Judicial Department	(Romania) Florin Comșa
Organizer of Competitions	(Romania) Decebal Curumi
Team Manager	(Romania) Costin Mega
Responsible for Order and Safety	(Romania) Constantin Stamate
Press Officer	(Romania) Ciprian Mihai

- Last updated: 1 June 2019
- Source: Board of directors (Hagi Academy)
- Source: Board of directors (Viitorul)

=== Current technical staff ===
Role	Name
Manager	(Romania) Gheorghe Hagi
Assistant managers	(Romania) Cătălin Anghel (Romania) Cristian Sava (Romania) Alexandru Popovici (Romania) Sorin Rădoi
Goalkeeping coach	(Romania) Ștefan Preda
Fitness coaches	(Spain) Juan Belmonte (Spain) Antonio Camacho
Club Doctor	(Syria) Shadi Flaha
Kinetotherapist	(Romania) Denis Răilean
Nutritionist	(Romania) Cristian Mărgărit
Masseurs	(Romania) Cosmin Ghiorghe (Romania) Daniel Stoian
Storeman	(Romania) Ștefan Pețu (Romania) Alexandru Căscătău
U19 Managers	(Spain) Alejandro Ortiz (Romania) Cristian Cămui (Romania) Vasile Mănăilă

- Last updated: 7 August 2019
- Source: Technical staff
- Source: Medical staff Archived 2019-07-11 at the Wayback Machine

== Players ==
=== Current squad ===
No.	Name	Nationality	Position	Date of birth (age)	Signed from	Signed in
Goalkeepers
43	Cătălin Căbuz	(Romania)	GK	18 June 1996 (age 30)	Academy	2009
1	Árpád Tordai	(Romania) (Hungary)	GK	11 March 1997 (age 29)	Academy	2014
Defenders
2	Radu Boboc	(Romania)	DF	24 July 1999 (age 27)	Academy	2013
3	Tiberiu Căpușă	(Romania)	RB	6 April 1998 (age 28)	Academy	2016
4	Damien Dussaut	(France)	DF	8 November 1994 (age 32)	FC Dinamo București	2019
5	Sebastian Mladen	(Romania)	CB	11 December 1991 (age 34)	F.C. Südtirol	2017
6	Bradley de Nooijer	(Netherlands)	DF	7 November 1997 (age 29)	FC Dordrecht	2017
16	Daniel Bîrzu	(Romania)	DF	28 May 2002 (age 24)	Academy	2009
15	Alexandru Georgescu	(Romania)	DF	10 July 2001 (age 25)	Academy	2010
21	Paul Iacob	(Romania)	RB	21 June 1996 (age 30)	Academy	2009
-	Cristian Ganea	(Romania)	CB	24 May 1992 (age 34)	Athletic Bilbao	2020
20	Bogdan Lazăr	(Romania)	DF	26 June 2003 (age 23)	Academy	2015
23	Virgil Ghiță	(Romania)	DF	4 June 1998 (age 28)	Academy	2011
93	Gabriel Buta	(Romania)	DF	29 January 2002 (age 24)	Academy	2009
97	Darius Grosu	(Romania)	DF	7 June 2002 (age 24)	Academy	2009
Midfielders
8	Carlo Casap	(Romania)	MF	29 December 1998 (age 27)	Academy	2017
13	Cosmin Matei	(Romania)	MF	30 September 1991 (age 35)	Gençlerbirliği S.K.	2019
14	Roberto Mălăele	(Romania)	MF	29 March 2003 (age 23)	Academy	2016
17	Andrei Ciobanu	(Romania)	MF	18 January 1998 (age 28)	Academy	2010
18	Andrei Artean	(Romania)	MF	14 August 1993 (age 33)	ACS Poli Timișoara	2018
19	Cosmin Bîrnoi	(Romania)	MF	17 September 1997 (age 29)	FC Politehnica Iași	2020
-	Malcom Edjouma	(France)	MF	8 October 1996 (age 30)	FC Lorient	2020
27	Marco Dulca	(Romania)	MF	11 May 1999 (age 27)	Swansea City U23	2019
77	Vlad Achim	(Romania)	MF	7 April 1989 (age 37)	FCSB	2018
90	Doru Dumitrescu	(Romania)	MF	25 May 1998 (age 28)	Academy	2015
96	Nicolas Popescu	(Romania)	MF	2 January 2003 (age 23)	Academy	2018
Forwards
7	Rivaldinho	(Brazil)	FW	29 April 1995 (age 31)	CSKA Sofia	2019
10	Gabriel Iancu	(Romania)	FW	29 April 1994 (age 32)	FC Dunărea Călărași	2019
11	George Ganea	(Romania)	FW	26 May 1999 (age 27)	CFR Cluj	2019
25	Aurelian Chițu	(Romania)	FW	25 March 1991 (age 35)	Daejeon Hana Citizen FC	2020
49	Luca Andronache	(Romania)	FW	26 July 2003 (age 23)	Academy, previously from FCSB II	2019
80	Alexi Pitu	(Romania)	FW	5 June 2002 (age 24)	Academy	2010
98	Louis Munteanu	(Romania)	FW	16 June 2002 (age 24)	Academy	2010
99	Ștefan Bodișteanu	(Romania) (Moldova)	FW	1 February 2003 (age 23)	Academy	2015

=== Transfers ===
==== In ====
Date	Pos.	Player	Age	Moving from	Fee	Notes	Source
14 June 2019	FW	(Romania) Gabriel Iancu	25	(Romania) FC Dunărea Călărași	Free		
21 June 2019	DF	(Romania) Steliano Filip	25	(Romania) FC Dunărea Călărași	Free		
2 July 2019	DF	(Romania) Marco Dulca	20	(Wales) Swansea City U23	Free		
4 July 2019	GK	(Romania) Cătălin Căbuz	23	(Romania) FC Hermannstadt	Free	Loan return	
1 July 2019	DF	(Romania) Tiberiu Căpușă	21	(Romania) Universitatea Cluj	Free	Loan return	
1 July 2019	MF	(Romania) Doru Dumitrescu	21	(Romania) Universitatea Cluj	Free	Loan return	
27 July 2019	FW	(Brazil) Rivaldinho	24	(Bulgaria) Levski Sofia	Free	previously on loan	
24 August 2019	MF	(Romania) Cosmin Matei	27	(Turkey) Gençlerbirliği S.K. Ankara	Free		
20 September 2019	DF	(France) Damien Dussaut	24	(Romania) FC Dinamo București	Free		
25 October 2019	FW	(Cameroon) Jacques Zoua	28	(Romania) AFC Astra Giurgiu	Free		
13 January 2020	FW	(Romania) Aurelian Chițu	28	(South Korea) Daejeon Hana Citizen FC	Free		
15 January 2020	MF	(Romania) Cosmin Bîrnoi	22	(Romania) FC Politehnica Iași	Free		
23 January 2020	MF	(France) Malcom Edjouma	23	(France) FC Lorient	Free		
20 February 2020	GK	(Romania) Árpád Tordai	22	(Romania) Universitatea Cluj	Free	Loan return	

==== Loans in ====
Date	Pos.	Player	Age	Moving from	Fee	Notes	Source
24 January 2020	DF	(Romania) Cristian Ganea	26	(Spain) Athletic Bilbao	Free		

==== Out ====
Pos.	Player	Moving to	Fee	Source
MF	(Romania) Tudor Băluță	(England) Brighton & Hove Albion	Loan return	
FW	(Romania) Alexandru Pop	(Romania) FC Universitatea Cluj	Free	
MF	(Romania) Ionuț Vînă	(Romania) FCSB	€750,000	
MF	(Romania) Ianis Hagi	(Belgium) K.R.C. Genk	€8,000,000	
DF	(Netherlands) Bas Kuipers	(Netherlands) NEC Nijmegen	Free	
MF	(Algeria) Najib Ammari	(Saudi Arabia) Damac FC, previously from Dunărea Călărași	Free	
FW	(France) Hamidou Keyta	(Romania) FC Botoșani, previously from Dunărea Călărași	Free	
MF	(Romania) Denis Drăguș	(Belgium) Standard Liège	€2,000,000	
MF	(France) Lyes Houri	(Hungary) Fehérvár FC	€600,000	
MF	(Brazil) Eric	(Romania) FC Voluntari	Free	
MF	(Romania) Andreias Calcan	(Hungary) Újpest FC	€100,000	
MF	(Romania) Steliano Filip	(Greece) AEL	Free	
DF	(Romania) Bogdan Țîru	(Poland) Jagiellonia Bialystok	€600,000	

==== Loans out ====
No.	Pos.	Nation	Player
—	GK	MDA	Sebastian Agachi (on loan to Argeș Pitești, previously on loan at Pucioasa)
—	DF	ROU	Gabriel Nedelea (on loan to SCM Gloria Buzău)
—	MF	ROU	Cosmin Tucaliuc (on loan to SCM Gloria Buzău)
—	DF	ROU	Robert Neciu (on loan to Chindia Târgoviște, previously on loan at Farul Constanța)
—	DF	ROU	Alexandru Sabangeanu (on loan to Dunărea Călărași, previously on loan at Farul Constanța)
—	MF	ROU	Răzvan Matiș (on loan to Argeș Pitești)
—	DF	ROU	Szabolcs Kilyén (on loan to Sepsi Sfântu Gheorghe, previously on loan at Mioveni)
—	FW	ROU	Dimciu Halep (on loan to Farul Constanța)
—	MF	ROU	Raul Vidrăsan (on loan to Turris Turnu Măgurele, previously on loan to ASU Politehnica Timișoara)
—	MF	ROU	Alexandru Negrean (on loan to Viitorul Târgu Jiu)
—	MF	ROU	Florian Haită (on loan to Turris Turnu Măgurele)
—	MF	ROU	Andreas Iani (on loan to Daco-Getica București, previously on loan at Farul Constanța)

No.	Pos.	Nation	Player
—	DF	ROU	Dan Panait (on loan to Farul Constanța, previously on loan to Chindia Târgoviște)
—	MF	ROU	Răzvan Matiș (on loan to Argeș Pitești)
—	MF	ROU	Alexandru Mățan (on loan to FC Voluntari)
—	MF	ROU	Andrei Tîrcoveanu (on loan to CS Concordia Chiajna)
—	GK	ROU	Árpád Tordai (on loan to Universitatea Cluj)
—	FW	ROU	Alexandru Stoica (on loan to Farul Constanța, previously on loan to Petrolul Ploiești)
—	DF	ROU	Robert Neciu (on loan to Universitatea Cluj, previously on loan at Chindia Târgoviște)
—	GK	ROU	Valentin Cojocaru (on loan to FC Voluntari)
—	DF	ROU	Marius Leca (on loan to Farul Constanța)
—	DF	ROU	Szabolcs Kilyén (on loan to FC Dinamo București, previously on loan at Sepsi Sfântu Gheorghe)
—	MF	ROU	Andreas Iani (on loan to Progresul Spartac București, previously on loan to Daco-Getica București)
—	FW	ROU	Remus Mihai (on loan to Afumați)

==== Retired players ====
No.	Pos.	Nation	Player
—	MF	ESP	Dani López

== Friendly matches ==
Win Draw Loss

19 June 2019	Olympiacos Piraeus (Greece)	3–2	(Romania) Viitorul Constanța	Athens, Greece
EEST (UTC+3)	Dimitrios Manos 30'; Thanasis Androutsos 32'; Guilherme 55'		George Ganea 34'; Gabriel Iancu 61'

24 June 2019	Viitorul Constanța (Romania)	8–0	(Romania) CS Colțea Brașov	Poiana Brașov, Romania
EEST (UTC+3)	Hamidou Keyta 15' 34' 61'; Gabriel Iancu 63'; Louis Munteanu 77' 86'; Ionuț Vînă 90'			Stadium: Campo Verde

24 June 2019	Viitorul Constanța (Romania)	3–1	(Romania) AFC Chindia Târgoviște	Poiana Brașov, Romania
EEST (UTC+3)	Andrei Artean 22'; Andreias Calcan 35'; George Ganea 39'		Andrei Șerban 85'	Stadium: Campo Verde

27 June 2019	Viitorul Constanța (Romania)	2–0	(Romania) FK Csíkszereda Miercurea Ciuc	Poiana Brașov, Romania
EEST (UTC+3)	Hamidou Keyta 18'; Cosmin Tucaliuc 67'			Stadium: Campo Verde

28 June 2019	Viitorul Constanța (Romania)	3–3	(Romania) FCSB	Brașov, Romania
11:00 EEST (UTC+3)	Iancu 28', 76' (pen.); Munteanu 85'		Hora 21'; Oaidă 48' 53'	Stadium: Silviu Ploeșteanu; Attendance: 500

3 July 2019	Viitorul Constanța (Romania)	2-1	(Bulgaria) PFC Cherno More Varna	Ovidiu, Romania
EEST (UTC+3)	Iancu 73' (pen.); George Ganea 79'		Jorginho 46'	Stadium: Viitorul

10 July 2019	Viitorul Constanța (Romania)	2-0	(Bulgaria) FC Spartak Varna	Ovidiu, Romania
EEST (UTC+3)	Eric 25'; Hamidou Keyta 34'			Stadium: Viitorul; Referee: Cristian Pascu, Marian Carson, Iulian Barbu (Constanța)

28 August 2019	Viitorul Constanța (Romania)	6–0	(Romania) CS Medgidia	Ovidiu, Romania
EEST (UTC+3)	Louis Munteanu 21' 23'; Carlo Casap 24'; Andrei Ciobanu 47'; Matei 54'; Luca Andronache 64'			Stadium: Complexul Academiei Gheorghe Hagi

7 September 2019	Viitorul Constanța (Romania)	2-0	(Romania) AFC Chindia Târgoviște	Călărași, Romania
EEST (UTC+3)	Cosmin Matei 39'; Carlo Casap 59'			Stadium: Ion Comșa

11 October 2019	Viitorul Constanța (Romania)	3-2	(Bulgaria) PFC Cherno More Varna	Ovidiu, Romania
EEST (UTC+3)	Alexi Pitu 13'; Alexi Pitu 86'; Lyes Houri 90+3'		Aristote N'Dongala 16'; Andrei Artean 90' (o.g.)	Stadium: Viitorul

16 November 2019	FC Academica Clinceni (Romania)	2-5	(Romania) Viitorul Constanța	Clinceni, Romania
EEST (UTC+3)	Răzvan Patriche 29'; Laurențiu Buș 85'		Jacques Zoua 47'; Lyes Houri 49'; Virgil Ghiță 60'; Rivaldinho 62' 76'	Stadium: Stadionul Clinceni

14 January 2020	Viitorul Constanța (Romania)	0-1	(Switzerland) BSC Young Boys	Belek, Turkey
EEST (UTC+3)			Roger Assalé 44'	Stadium: Regnum Max Belek

17 January 2020	Viitorul Constanța (Romania)	1–2	(Ukraine) Olimpik Donetsk	Belek, Turkey
11:00 EET (UTC+02:00)	35'		Chogadze 10'; Tsymbalyuk 67'	Stadium: Sueno Hotels sport complex

22 January 2020	Viitorul Constanța (Romania)	0–1	(Serbia) FK Partizan Belgrade	Antalya, Turkey
09:00			Jović 68'	Stadium: Sueno Golf stadium Attendance: 50

21 January 2020	Viitorul Constanța (Romania)	0-0	(Austria) SK Sturm Graz	Belek, Turkey
EEST (UTC+3)

24 January 2020	Viitorul Constanța (Romania)	1-4	(Kosovo) KF Ballkani	Belek, Turkey
EEST (UTC+3)	Cosmin Matei 78'		Artur Magani 10'; Arber Prekazi 13'; Visar Berisha 42'; Arbër Hoxha 45'	Stadium: Sueno Belek

24 January 2020	Viitorul Constanța (Romania)	1-1	(Poland) Jagiellonia Białystok	Belek, Turkey
EEST (UTC+3)	Rivaldinho 3'		Jesús Imaz 11'	Stadium: Sueno Belek

29 February 2020	Viitorul Constanța (Romania)	0–2	(Romania) Axiopolis Cernavodă	Ovidiu, Romania
EEST (UTC+3)			Alexandru Moise 7'; Belhaj Imad 67'	Stadium: Complexul Academiei Gheorghe Hagi

6 June 2020	CS Universitatea Craiova (Romania)	0-3	(Romania) Viitorul Constanța	Craiova, Romania
EEST (UTC+3)			Louis Munteanu 21'; Cosmin Bîrnoi 31'; Louis Munteanu 41'	Stadium: Lunca Jiului

6 June 2020	CS Universitatea Craiova (Romania)	2-1	(Romania) Viitorul Constanța	Craiova, Romania
EEST (UTC+3)	Cristian Bărbuț 38' 80'		Rivaldinho 6'	Stadium: Lunca Jiului

24 June 2020	Viitorul Constanța (Romania)	3-1	(Romania) Petrolul Ploiești	Ovidiu, Romania
EEST (UTC+3)	Gabriel Dănuleasa 59'; Louis Munteanu 67'; Alexi Pitu 86' (pen.)		Leonel Pierce 90+2'	Stadium: Viitorul

== Competitions ==
Win Draw Loss

=== Supercupa României ===
==== Final ====
6 July 2019	CFR Cluj	0–1	Viitorul Constanța	Ilie Oană Stadium
20:00 EEST (UTC+03)		Report 1 Report 2 Report 3	Artean 86'	Attendance: 7,218; Referee: Sebastian Colţescu

CFR Cluj	Viitorul Constanța

GK	87	(Lithuania) Giedrius Arlauskis
RB	77	(Romania) Andrei Peteleu
CB	55	(Brazil) Paulo Vinícius
CB	30	(Romania) Andrei Mureșan
LB	45	(Portugal) Camora (c)	(yellow card) 90'
RCM	37	(Romania) Mihai Bordeianu
CM	8	(Croatia) Damjan Djoković	(yellow card) 28'
LCM	94	(Romania) Cătălin Itu		(substituted off) 46'
RW	10	(Romania) Ciprian Deac
CF	9	(France) Billel Omrani	(yellow card) 12'	(substituted off) 75'
LW	18	(Romania) Valentin Costache		(substituted off) 70'
Substitutes:
DF	3	(Romania) Andrei Burcă
MF	7	(Romania) Alexandru Păun
GK	12	(Romania) Cosmin Vâtcă
DF	16	(Bosnia and Herzegovina) Mateo Sušić
MF	19	(Argentina) Emmanuel Culio		(substituted on) 46'
FW	20	(Romania) George Țucudean		(substituted on) 75'
MF	62	(Romania) Claudiu Petrila		(substituted on) 70'
Manager:
(Romania) Dan Petrescu

GK	1	(Romania) Árpád Tordai
RB	5	(Romania) Sebastian Mladen
CB	15	(Romania) Bogdan Țîru (c)
CB	21	(Romania) Paul Iacob	(yellow card) 41'
LB	6	(Netherlands) Bradley de Nooijer		(substituted off) 73'
RCM	19	(France) Lyes Houri
CM	18	(Romania) Andrei Artean	86'
LCM	11	(Romania) Ionuț Vînă
AM	28	(Romania) Alexandru Mățan
FW	9	(Romania) Gabriel Iancu	(yellow card) 50'	(substituted off) 61'
FW	99	(Romania) George Ganea		(substituted off) 72'
Substitutes:
DF	4	(Netherlands) Bas Kuipers		(substituted on) 73'
GK	12	(Romania) Valentin Cojocaru
MF	20	(Romania) Andrei Tîrcoveanu
DF	25	(Romania) Marius Leca		(substituted on) 72'
MF	30	(Romania) Andreias Calcan		(substituted on) 61'
MF	77	(Romania) Vlad Achim
MF	80	(Romania) Alexi Pitu
Manager:
(Romania) Gheorghe Hagi

Man of the match

- (Romania) Andrei Artean

Match officials

- Assistant referees:
  - Ovidiu Artene
  - Daniel Mitruți
- Fourth official:
  - George Găman
- Additional assistant referees:
  - Ciprian Paraschiv
  - Aron Huzu

Match rules

- 90 minutes.
- Penalty shoot-out if the scores is still level.
- Seven named substitutes.
- Maximum of three substitutions.

=== Liga I ===
The Liga I fixture list was announced in July 2019.

==== Regular season ====
===== Table =====
Pos	Team	Pld	W	D	L	GF	GA	GD	Pts	Qualification
5	Gaz Metan Mediaș	26	12	7	7	34	30	+4	43	Qualification for the Championship round
6	Astra Giurgiu (Note: Astra Giurgiu were deducted 3 points due to financial reasons.)	26	13	6	7	38	29	+9	42	Qualification for the Championship round
7	Viitorul Constanța	26	11	7	8	44	29	+15	40	Qualification for the Relegation round
8	Dinamo București	26	10	4	12	37	41	−4	34	Qualification for the Relegation round
9	Sepsi OSK	26	7	12	7	30	26	+4	33	Qualification for the Relegation round

Source: LPF (in Romanian), Soccerway
Rules for classification: 1) Points; 2) Head-to-head points; 3) Head-to-head goal difference; 4) Head-to-head goals scored; 5) Goal difference; 6) Goals scored; 7) Play-off.

===== Results by round =====
Round	1	2	3	4	5	6	7	8	9	10	11	12	13	14	15	16	17	18	19	20	21	22	23	24	25	26
Ground	H	A	H	A	H	A	H	A	H	H	A	H	A	A	H	A	H	A	H	A	H	A	A	H	A	A
Result	W	W	W	D	D	D	W	L	W	W	L	W	D	L	W	D	W	L	L	W	L	L	W	L	D	D
Position	1	1	1	1	2	3	2	4	2	2	3	2	2	2	2	2	2	2	3	3	5	6	6	7	7	7

Updated to match(es) played on June 2019. Source: Liga I
A = Away; H = Home; W = Win; D = Draw; L = Loss

===== Matches =====
Win Draw Loss

15 July 2019 1	Viitorul Constanța	5–0	Dinamo București	Ovidiu
21:00 EEST (UTC+3)	Iancu 9', 69'; Ganea 48'; Calcan 66'; Eric 70'			Stadium: Viitorul; Referee: Marcel Bîrsan (Bucharest)

20 July 2019 2	Chindia Târgoviște	0–1	Viitorul Constanța	Ploiești
			Eric 54'	Stadium: Ilie Oană

27 July 2019 3	Viitorul Constanța	3–2	Hermannstadt	Ovidiu
	Țîru 51'; Eric 63'; Ciobanu 80'		Yazalde 75'; Stoica 89'	Stadium: Viitorul

3 August 2019 4	Sepsi Sfântu Gheorghe	2–2	Viitorul Constanța	Sfântu Gheorghe
	Nicolae Carnat 37'; Rachid Bouhenna 90+3'		Ciobanu 46'; Eric 52' (pen.)	Stadium: Municipal

10 August 2019 5	Viitorul Constanța	2–2	Botoșani	Ovidiu
	Eric 12' (pen.); Iancu 65'		Stefan Aškovski 27', 81'	Stadium: Viitorul

17 August 2019 6	Astra Giurgiu	1-1	Viitorul Constanța	Giurgiu
	Tamaș 38' (o.g.)		Gheorghe 40'	Stadium: Marin Anastasovici

24 August 2019 7	Viitorul Constanța	4-0	Voluntari	Ovidiu
	Iancu 16'; Ganea 55'; Houri 82'; Rivaldinho 86'			Stadium: Viitorul

1 September 2019 8	FCSB	2–1	Viitorul Constanța	Pitești
21:00 EEST (UTC+03)	Vînă (penalty missed) 18'; Popescu (yellow card) 33'; Oaidă (yellow card) 35'; Popa 38'; Gnohéré 65'		Iacob (yellow card) 42'; Iancu 45+1'; Filip (yellow card) 57'; Houri (yellow card) 62'	Stadium: Nicolae Dobrin; Attendance: 4,755; Referee: Radu Petrescu; Assistant referees: Radu Ghinguleac, Valentin Avram; Fourth official: Lucian Rusandu

14 September 2019 9	Viitorul Constanța	4-1	Gaz Metan Mediaș	Ovidiu
	Iancu 16' 74'; Țîru 64'; Rivaldinho 89' (pen.)			Stadium: Viitorul

21 September 2019 10	Viitorul Constanța	2-1	Politehnica Iași	Ovidiu
	Vlad Achim 80' (pen.); Rivaldinho 90+1'			Stadium: Viitorul

28 September 2019 11	Universitatea Craiova	3-1	Viitorul Constanța	Craiova
	Alexandru Cicâldău 44'; Elvir Koljić 45'; Mihai Bălașa 55'		Bogdan Țîru 8'	Stadium: Ion Oblemenco

5 October 2019 12	Viitorul Constanța	3-1	CFR Cluj	Ovidiu
	Andrei Peteleu 27' (o.g.); Cosmin Matei 36'; Rivaldinho 57'		Emmanuel Culio 76'	Stadium: Viitorul

19 October 2019 13	Academica Clinceni	0-0	Viitorul Constanța	Călărași
				Stadium: Stadionul Ion Comșa

26 October 2019 14	Dinamo București	3-2	Viitorul Constanța	Bucharest
	Slavko Perović 29'; Deian Sorescu 30'; Ioan Filip 61'		Gabriel Iancu 76'; Radu Boboc 79'	Stadium: Dinamo

2 November 2019 15	Viitorul Constanța	3-0	Chindia Târgoviște	Ovidiu
	George Ganea 6'; Radu Boboc 27'; Louis Munteanu 93'			Stadium: Viitorul

9 November 2019 16	Hermannstadt	1-1	Viitorul Constanța	Târgu Mureș
	Gabriel Debeljuh 45+1'		Vlad Achim 14' (pen.)	Stadium: Trans-Sil

23 November 2019 17	Viitorul Constanța	4-1	Sepsi Sfântu Gheorghe	Ovidiu
	Virgil Ghiță 4'; Louis Munteanu 52'; Rivaldinho 78'; Cosmin Matei 86' (pen.)		Pavol Safranko 27'	Stadium: Viitorul

30 November 2019 18	Botoșani	1-0	Viitorul Constanța	Botoșani
	Hervin Ongenda 17' (pen.)			Stadium: Municipal

4 December 2019 19	Viitorul Constanța	0-1	Astra Giurgiu	Ovidiu
			Valentin Gheorghe 77'	Stadium: Viitorul

7 December 2019 20	Voluntari	1-2	Viitorul Constanța	Voluntari
	Andraz Struna 66'		Rivaldinho 70'; Louis Munteanu 89'	Stadium: Anghel Iordănescu

14 December 2019 21	Viitorul Constanța	0-2	FCSB	Ovidiu
			Aristidis Soiledis 22'; Florinel Coman 45'	Stadium: Viitorul

21 December 2019 22	Gaz Metan Mediaș	1-0	Viitorul Constanța	Mediaș
	Nasser Chamed 45'			Stadium: Gaz Metan

1 February 2020 23	Politehnica Iași	1-2	Viitorul Constanța	Iași
	Michael Omoh 2'		Jacques Zoua 80'; Gabriel Iancu 85'	Stadium: Emil Alexandrescu

8 February 2020 24	Viitorul Constanța	1-2	Universitatea Craiova	Ovidiu
	Gabriel Iancu 45'		Luis Emanuel Nițu 25'; Valentin Mihăilă 82'	Stadium: Viitorul

15 February 2020 25	CFR Cluj	0-0	Viitorul Constanța	Cluj-Napoca
				Stadium: Dr. Constantin Rădulescu

22 February 2020 26	Viitorul Constanța	0-0	Academica Clinceni	Ovidiu
				Stadium: Viitorul

==== Relegation round ====
===== Table =====
Pos	Team	Pld	W	D	L	GF	GA	GD	Pts	Qualification or relegation
7	Viitorul Constanța	14	6	5	3	25	17	+8	43	
8	Hermannstadt	12	6	4	2	18	14	+4	35	
9	Sepsi OSK	13	4	5	4	19	17	+2	34	
10	Academica Clinceni	14	7	0	7	14	21	−7	32	
11	Voluntari	14	6	3	5	16	12	+4	31	
12	Politehnica Iași	14	5	4	5	17	17	0	30	
13	Dinamo București	9	2	2	5	8	11	−3	25	
14	Chindia Târgoviște (O)	12	3	1	8	9	17	−8	23	Qualification for the relegation play-offs

Source: Soccerway, FRF (in Romanian), LPF (in Romanian)
Rules for classification: 1) Points; 2) Points without rounding; 3) Head-to-head points; 4) Head-to-head goal difference; 5) Head-to-head goals scored; 6) Goal difference; 7) Goals scored; 8) Play-off (only if needed to decide teams for relegation). (Note: only criteria 6 and 7 are applied to establish the classification during the competition.)
(O) Play-off winners

===== Results by round =====
Round	1	2	3	4	5	6	7	8	9	10	11	12	13	14
Ground	H	A	H	A	H	A	H	A	H	A	H	A	H	A
Result	D	W	W	L	W	D	W	D	W	D	W	L	L	D
Position	7	7	7	7	7	7	7	7	7	7	7	7	7	7

Updated to match(es) played on 2020. Source: Liga I
A = Away; H = Home; W = Win; D = Draw; L = Loss

===== Matches =====
Win Draw Loss

29 February 2020 1	Viitorul Constanța	0-0	FC Voluntari	Ovidiu
				Stadium: Viitorul

7 March 2020 2	Academica Clinceni	2-3	Viitorul Constanța	Clinceni
	Eugeniu Cebotaru 44'; Adrian Șut 55'		Cristian Ganea 19'; Gabriel Iancu 74' (pen.); Rivaldinho 78'	Stadium: Stadionul Clinceni

14 June 2020 3	Viitorul Constanța	2-1	Politehnica Iași	Ovidiu
	Andrei Ciobanu 26'; Virgil Ghiță 72'		Juan Pablo Passaglia 37'	Stadium: Viitorul

17 June 2020 4	Chindia Târgoviște	2-1	Viitorul Constanța	Ploiești
	Cosmin Matei 85'		Cristian Neguț 10' 89'	Stadium: Ilie Oană

22 June 2020 5	Viitorul Constanța	4-1	Hermannstadt	Ovidiu
	Vlad Achim 4' 90+3'; Gabriel Iancu 71' 79'		Adrian Bălan 88'	Stadium: Viitorul

27 June 2020 6	Sepsi Sfântu Gheorghe	3–3	Viitorul Constanța	Sfântu Gheorghe
	Lorand Fülöp 42'; Gabriel Vașvari 65' (pen.); Pavol Šafranko 86'		Gabriel Iancu 11' (pen.); Virgil Ghiță 17'; Cosmin Matei 58'	Stadium: Municipal

2 July 2020 7	Viitorul Constanța	1–0	Dinamo București	Ovidiu
20:00 EEST (UTC+3)	Ghiță 17'			Stadium: Viitorul; Attendance: 0 Referee: George Găman (Craiova)
Note: The match should have been played on 18/19 April 2020 but it was postponed due to the COVID-19 pandemic.

6 July 2020 8	Voluntari	0-0	Viitorul Constanța	Voluntari
				Stadium: Anghel Iordănescu

11 July 2020 9	Viitorul Constanța	5-0	Academica Clinceni	Ovidiu
	Rivaldinho 20' 74'; Damien Dussaut 52'; Gabriel Iancu 84' 90+3' (pen.)			Stadium: Viitorul

20 July 2020 10	Politehnica Iași	1-1	Viitorul Constanța	Iași
	Michael Omoh 17'		Gabriel Iancu 73'	Stadium: Emil Alexandrescu

25 July 2020 11	Viitorul Constanța	4-1	Chindia Târgoviște	Ovidiu
	George Ganea 42'; Gabriel Iancu 61'; Rivaldinho 71' 83'		Daniel Florea 65'	Stadium: Viitorul

29 July 2020 12	Hermannstadt	2-0	Viitorul Constanța	Sibiu
	Ionuț Stoica 76'; Gabriel Debeljuh 84' (pen.)			Stadium: Stadionul Municipal (Sibiu)

1 August 2020 13	Viitorul Constanța	0–3	Sepsi Sfântu Gheorghe	Ovidiu
			Nicolae Carnat 8' 32'; Marius Ștefănescu 16'	Stadium: Viitorul

8 June 2020 14	Dinamo București	1-1	Viitorul Constanța	Bucharest
	Deian Sorescu 37'		Vlad Achim 35' (pen.)	Stadium: Dinamo

=== Cupa României ===
Viitorul will enter the Cupa României at the Round of 32.

==== Round of 32 ====
26 September 2019	CS Sănătatea Servicii Publice Cluj	1-0	Viitorul Constanța	Cluj-Napoca

=== UEFA Europa League ===
==== Qualifying rounds ====
===== Second qualifying round =====
25 July 2019 First leg	K.A.A. Gent (Belgium)	6–3	(Romania) Viitorul Constanța	Ghent
EEST (UTC+03)	Asare 4'; Dejaegere 13'; Kubo 35', 45'; Yaremchuk 42' (pen.), 51'		Mladen 21'; Țîru 56', 61'	Stadium: Ghelamco Arena

1 August 2019 Second leg	Viitorul Constanța (Romania)	2–1 (5–7 agg.)	(Belgium) K.A.A. Gent	Ovidiu
EEST (UTC+03)	Iancu 47' (pen.), 61' (pen.)		Yaremchuk 38'	Stadium: Stadionul Viitorul

== Statistics ==
=== Appearances and goals ===
No.	Pos	Player	Liga I		Cupa României		Supercupa României		Europa League		Total	
No.	Pos	Player	Apps	Goals	Apps	Goals	Apps	Goals	Apps	Goals	Apps	Goals
5	MF	(Romania) Sebastian Mladen	32	0	0	0	1	0	2	1	35	1
21	MF	(Romania) Paul Iacob	25	0	1	0	1	0	1	0	28	0
6	DF	(Netherlands) Bradley de Nooijer	31	0	0	0	1	0	2	0	34	0
18	MF	(Romania) Andrei Artean	36	0	0	0	1	1	2	0	39	1
9	FW	(Romania) Gabriel Iancu	27	18	0	0	1	0	2	2	30	20
11	FW	(Romania) George Ganea	29	5	1	0	1	0	2	0	33	5
77	MF	(Romania) Vlad Achim	27	5	0	0	0	0	2	0	29	5
23	DF	(Romania) Virgil Ghiță	27	4	0	0	0	0	2	0	29	4
2	DF	(Romania) Radu Boboc	34	2	1	0	0	0	0	0	35	2
17	MF	(Romania) Andrei Ciobanu	30	3	1	0	0	0	0	0	31	3
27	MF	(Romania) Marco Dulca	13	0	0	0	0	0	0	0	13	0
43	GK	(Romania) Cătălin Căbuz	29	0	0	0	0	0	1	0	30	0
80	MF	(Romania) Alexi Pitu	9	0	1	0	0	0	0	0	10	0
7	FW	(Brazil) Rivaldinho	27	11	0	0	0	0	0	0	27	11
80	MF	(Romania) Carlo Casap	12	0	1	0	0	0	0	0	13	0
80	MF	(Romania) Cosmin Matei	23	5	1	0	0	0	0	0	24	5
98	FW	(Romania) Louis Munteanu	19	3	0	0	0	0	0	0	19	3
22	DF	(Romania) Cristian Ganea	10	1	0	0	0	0	0	0	10	1
25	FW	(Romania) Aurelian Chițu	15	0	0	0	0	0	0	0	15	0
4	DF	(France) Damien Dussaut	14	1	0	0	0	0	0	0	14	1
20	MF	(France) Malcom Edjouma	4	0	0	0	0	0	0	0	4	0
1	GK	(Romania) Árpád Tordai	11	0	0	0	1	0	1	0	13	0
19	MF	(Romania) Cosmin Bîrnoi	1	0	0	0	0	0	0	0	1	0
97	MF	(Romania) Darius Grosu	2	0	0	0	0	0	0	0	2	0
3	DF	(Romania) Tiberiu Căpușă	4	0	0	0	0	0	0	0	4	0
99	FW	(Moldova) Ștefan Bodișteanu	3	0	0	0	0	0	0	0	3	0
15	DF	(Romania) Alexandru Georgescu	1	0	0	0	0	0	0	0	1	0
20	DF	(Romania) Bogdan Lazăr	2	0	0	0	0	0	0	0	2	0
49	FW	(Romania) Luca Andronache	1	0	0	0	0	0	0	0	1	0
Players sent out on loan this season
20	MF	(Romania) Andrei Tîrcoveanu	2	0	0	0	0	0	0	0	2	0
28	MF	(Romania) Alexandru Mățan	3	0	0	0	1	0	2	0	6	0
25	DF	(Romania) Marius Leca	1	0	1	0	1	0	0	0	3	0
12	GK	(Romania) Valentin Cojocaru	0	0	1	0	0	0	0	0	1	0
Players transferred out during the season
11	MF	(Romania) Ionuț Vînă	0	0	0	0	1	0	0	0	1	0
13	MF	(Algeria) Najib Ammari	1	0	0	0	0	0	0	0	1	0
4	DF	(Netherlands) Bas Kuipers	1	0	0	0	1	0	0	0	2	0
7	FW	(Romania) Denis Drăguș	1	0	0	0	0	0	0	0	1	0
10	MF	(Brazil) Eric	6	5	1	0	0	0	2	0	9	5
19	MF	(France) Lyes Houri	21	1	0	0	1	0	2	0	24	1
3	DF	(Romania) Steliano Filip	12	0	1	0	0	0	1	0	14	0
30	MF	(Romania) Andreias Calcan	8	1	1	0	1	0	2	0	12	1
15	DF	(Romania) Bogdan Țîru	19	3	1	0	1	0	2	2	23	5
49	FW	(Cameroon) Jacques Zoua	6	1	0	0	0	0	0	0	6	1

=== Goalscorers ===
R	No.	Pos.	Nation	Name	Liga I	Cupa României	Supercupa României	Europa League	Total
1	9	FW	(Romania)	Gabriel Iancu	18	0	0	2	20
2	7	FW	(Brazil)	Rivaldinho	11	0	0	0	11
3	10	MF	(Brazil)	Eric	5	0	0	0	5
3	15	MF	(Romania)	Bogdan Țîru	3	0	0	2	5
3	77	MF	(Romania)	Vlad Achim	5	0	0	0	5
4	11	FW	(Romania)	George Ganea	4	0	0	0	4
4	23	DF	(Romania)	Virgil Ghiță	4	0	0	0	4
4	13	MF	(Romania)	Cosmin Matei	4	0	0	0	4
5	98	FW	(Romania)	Louis Munteanu	3	0	0	0	3
5	17	MF	(Romania)	Andrei Ciobanu	3	0	0	0	3
6	2	DF	(Romania)	Radu Boboc	2	0	0	0	2
7	18	MF	(Romania)	Andrei Artean	0	0	1	0	1
7	30	MF	(Romania)	Andreias Calcan	1	0	0	0	1
7	5	MF	(Romania)	Sebastian Mladen	0	0	0	1	1
7	19	MF	(France)	Lyes Houri	1	0	0	0	1
7	49	FW	(Cameroon)	Jacques Zoua	1	0	0	0	1
7	22	DF	(Romania)	Cristian Ganea	1	0	0	0	1
7	4	DF	(France)	Damien Dussaut	1	0	0	0	1

=== Clean sheets ===
Rank	Name	Liga I	Cupa României	Supercupa României	Europa League	Total	Played Games
1	(Romania) Cătălin Căbuz	6	0	0	0	6	30
2	(Romania) (Hungary) Árpád Tordai	5	0	1	0	6	13
3	(Romania) Valentin Cojocaru^{1}	0	0	0	0	0	1

^{1} Valentin Cojocaru was transferred to FC Voluntari during the winter transfer window.

=== Attendances ===
	Matches	Attendances	Average	High	Low
Liga I	20	41,652	4,500	2,975	900
Cupa României	1	-	-	-	-
Supercupa României	1	7218	0	7,218	-
Europa League	2	4088	0	4088	4088

=== Disciplinary record ===
As of 2020

Includes all competitive matches. Players listed below made at least one appearance for FC Viitorul Constanța first squad during the season.

N	P	Nat.	Name	Liga I			Cupa României			Supercupa României			Europa League			Total			Notes
N	P	Nat.	Name	Yellow card	Second yellow card	Red card	Yellow card	Second yellow card	Red card	Yellow card	Second yellow card	Red card	Yellow card	Second yellow card	Red card	Yellow card	Second yellow card	Red card	Notes
21	MF	(Romania)	Paul Iacob	3	0	0	0	0	0	1	0	0	1	0	0	5	0	0	0
9	FW	(Romania)	Gabriel Iancu	8	0	0	0	0	0	1	0	0	1	0	0	10	0	0	0
18	MF	(Romania)	Andrei Artean	8	0	0	0	0	0	0	0	0	0	0	0	8	0	0	0
20	MF	(Romania)	Andrei Tîrcoveanu	1	0	0	0	0	0	0	0	0	0	0	0	1	0	0	0
4	DF	(Netherlands)	Bas Kuipers	1	0	0	0	0	0	0	0	0	0	0	0	1	0	0	0
15	DF	(Romania)	Bogdan Țîru	8	0	0	0	0	0	0	0	0	0	0	0	8	0	0	0
11	DF	(Romania)	George Ganea	4	0	0	0	0	0	0	0	0	1	0	0	5	0	0	0
6	DF	(Netherlands)	Bradley de Nooijer	0	1	0	0	0	0	0	0	0	1	0	0	2	0	0	0
2	DF	(Romania)	Radu Boboc	6	0	0	0	0	0	0	0	0	0	0	0	6	0	0	0
3	DF	(Romania)	Steliano Filip	3	0	0	0	0	0	0	0	0	0	0	0	3	0	0	0
77	MF	(Romania)	Vlad Achim	7	0	0	0	0	0	0	0	0	0	0	0	7	0	0	0
19	MF	(France)	Lyes Houri	4	0	0	0	0	0	0	0	0	0	0	0	4	0	0	0
5	DF	(Romania)	Sebastian Mladen	8	0	0	0	0	0	0	0	0	0	0	0	8	0	0	0
27	MF	(Romania)	Marco Dulca	2	0	0	0	0	0	0	0	0	0	0	0	2	0	0	0
13	MF	(Romania)	Cosmin Matei	4	0	0	0	0	0	0	0	0	0	0	0	4	0	0	0
43	GK	(Romania)	Cătălin Căbuz	3	0	0	0	0	0	0	0	0	0	0	0	3	0	0	0
17	MF	(Romania)	Andrei Ciobanu	4	0	0	0	0	0	0	0	0	0	0	0	4	0	0	0
5	DF	(Romania)	Virgil Ghiță	3	0	0	0	0	0	0	0	0	0	0	0	3	0	0	0
22	DF	(Romania)	Cristian Ganea	1	0	0	0	0	0	0	0	0	0	0	0	1	0	0	0
4	DF		Damien Dussaut	4	0	0	0	0	0	0	0	0	0	0	0	4	0	0	0
20	MF	(France)	Malcom Edjouma	1	0	0	0	0	0	0	0	0	0	0	0	1	0	0	0
97	DF	(Romania)	Darius Grosu	1	0	0	0	0	0	0	0	0	0	0	0	1	0	0	0
20	DF	(Romania)	Bogdan Lazăr	1	0	0	0	0	0	0	0	0	0	0	0	1	0	0	0

Last updated: 2020
Ordered by (red card) , (second yellow card) and (yellow card)
(yellow card) = Number of bookings; (second yellow card) = Number of sending offs after a second yellow card; (red card) = Number of sending offs by a direct red card.

=== Managerial statistics (2019-20 season) ===
Manager	From	To	Record						
Manager	From	To	G	W	D	L	GF	GA	GD
(Romania) Gheorghe Hagi	September 2014	2 August 2020	43	19	11	13	74	49	44.19
(Romania) Cătălin Anghel(caretaker)	2 August 2020	6 August 2020	1	0	1	0	1	1	0.00

== UEFA Club rankings ==
This is the current UEFA Club Rankings, including season 2019–20.

Rank	Team	Points	Mvmnt
194	(Switzerland) FC Luzern	5.500	
195	(Armenia) FC Pyunik	5.500	
196	(Liechtenstein) FC Vaduz	5.500	
197	(Romania) FC Viitorul Constanța	5.500	
198	(Albania) FK Kukësi	5.500	
199	(Slovakia) AS Trenčín	5.500	
200	(Czech Republic) FK Mladá Boleslav	4.500	

== See also ==
- 2019–20 Cupa României
- 2019–20 Liga I
