= 2020–21 Fehérvár FC season =

Fehérvár
2020–21 season
- Owner: István Garancsi
- Head coach: Gábor Márton (until 17 February 2021); Imre Szabics
- Stadium: MOL Aréna Sóstó
- Nemzeti Bajnokság I: 3rd
- Hungarian Cup: Runners-up
- UEFA Europa League: Play-off round
- Top goalscorer: League: Nemanja Nikolić (15 goals); All: Nemanja Nikolić (22 goals)
Home colours	Away colours	Third colours
- All statistics correct as of 9 May 2021.

The 2020–21 BSC Fehérvár FC season was the club's 80th season in existence and the 22nd consecutive season in the top flight of Hungarian football. In addition to the domestic league, Fehérvár participated in this season's editions of the Hungarian Cup and the UEFA Europa League. The season covers the period from 1 July 2020 to 30 June 2021.

== Players ==
=== First-team squad ===
As of 22 July 2020

Note: Flags indicate national team as defined under FIFA eligibility rules; some limited exceptions apply. Players may hold more than one non-FIFA nationality.

No.	Pos.	Nation	Player
1	GK	HUN	Dániel Kovács
4	DF	ROU	Adrian Rus
5	DF	HUN	Attila Fiola
7	MF	UKR	Ivan Petryak
9	FW	GEO	Budu Zivzivadze
10	MF	HUN	István Kovács
11	DF	FRA	Loïc Négo
15	FW	BIH	Armin Hodžić
16	DF	MKD	Visar Musliu
17	MF	HUN	Máté Pátkai
19	MF	MKD	Boban Nikolov
20	FW	BRA	Evandro

No.	Pos.	Nation	Player
22	DF	CPV	Stopira (captain)
24	MF	HUN	Patrik Nyári
27	FW	HUN	Levente Szabó
42	GK	SRB	Emil Rockov
49	MF	HUN	Krisztián Géresi
65	DF	HUN	Szilveszter Hangya
70	FW	NGR	Funsho Bamgboye
71	FW	HUN	Nemanja Nikolic
74	GK	HUN	Ádám Kovácsik
77	DF	HUN	Bendegúz Bolla
95	MF	BRA	Alef
96	MF	FRA	Lyes Houri

== Transfers ==
=== In ===
No.	Pos	Player	Transferred from	Fee	Date	Source
42	GK	(Serbia) Emil Rockov	(Serbia) Vojvodina	€120,000	17 July 2020	
9	FW	(Georgia (country)) Budu Zivzivadze	(Hungary) Mezőkövesd	€350,000	10 July 2020	
20	FW	(Brazil) Evandro	(Bulgaria) CSKA Sofia	€600,000	17 July 2020	
95	MF	(Brazil) Alef	(Portugal) Braga	€150,000	14 August 2020	

=== Out ===
No.	Pos	Player	Transferred to	Fee	Date	Source
25	DF	(Hungary) Krisztián Tamás	(Hungary) Budapest Honvéd	€250,000	14 July 2020	
3	DF	(Hungary) Vinícius	(Uruguay) Club Nacional	Free	31 July 2020	

=== Loan out ===
No.	Pos	Player	Loaned to	Date	Source
99	FW	(Hungary) Dániel Zsóri	(Hungary) Budafok	1 July 2020	
35	GK	(Hungary) Bence Gundel-Takács	(Hungary) Győr ETO	3 August 2020	
83	DF	(Hungary) Olivér Tamás	(Hungary) Budaörs	3 August 2020	

== Pre-season and friendlies ==
Win Draw Loss Fixtures

25 July 2020 Friendly	(Hungary) Szombathelyi Haladás	0 – 0	(Hungary) Fehérvár	Szombathely
19:00 CEST (UTC+2)		Report		Stadium: Haladás Sportkomplexum

28 July 2020 Friendly	(Slovakia) Slovan Bratislava	2 – 2	(Hungary) Fehérvár	Bratislava
17:30 CEST (UTC+2)		Report		Stadium: Štadión Tehelné pole

1 August 2020 Friendly	(Hungary) Fehérvár	1 – 1	(Slovenia) Mura	Szombathely
18:00 CEST (UTC+2)		Report		Stadium: Haladás Sportkomplexum

8 August 2020 Friendly	(Hungary) Fehérvár	1 – 0	(Hungary) Újpest	Székesfehérvár
10:00 CEST (UTC+2)		Report		Stadium: MOL Aréna Sóstó

8 August 2020 Friendly	(Czech Republic) Slavia Prague	3 – 1	(Hungary) Fehérvár	Frauenkirchen
17:45 CEST (UTC+2)		Report		Stadium: Sportplatz Frauenkirchen

8 January 2021 Friendly	(Hungary) Fehérvár	1 – 0	(Croatia) Rijeka	Umag
15:30 CET		Report		Stadium: Gradski stadion

10 January 2021 Friendly	(Hungary) Fehérvár	1 – 3	(Austria) Sturm Graz	Poreč
15:00 CET		Report		Stadium: Stadion Veli Jože

12 January 2021 Friendly	(Hungary) Fehérvár	6 – 2	(Croatia) Orijent 1919	Funtana
15:00 CET		Report		Stadium: NK Funtana Stadion

14 January 2021 Friendly	(Croatia) Dinamo Zagreb	2 – 1	(Hungary) Fehérvár	Rovinj
13:00 CET		Report		Stadium: Stadion Valbruna

16 January 2021 Friendly	(Croatia) Osijek	2 – 2	(Hungary) Fehérvár	Rovinj
11:15 CET		Report		Stadium: Stadion Valbruna

== Competitions ==
=== Overview ===
Competition	First match	Last match	Starting round	Final position	Record							
Competition	First match	Last match	Starting round	Final position	Pld	W	D	L	GF	GA	GD	Win %
Nemzeti Bajnokság I	15 August 2020	9 May 2021	Matchday 1	3rd	33	16	8	9	68	38	+30	48.48
Hungarian Cup	20 September 2020	3 May 2021	Sixth round	runners-up	7	6	0	1	17	5	+12	85.71
UEFA Europa League	27 August 2020	1 October 2020	First qualifying round	Play-off round	4	1	2	1	3	4	−1	25.00
Total					44	23	10	11	88	47	+41	52.27

Last updated: 9 May 2021
Source: Soccerway

=== Nemzeti Bajnokság I ===
==== League table ====
Pos	Team	Pld	W	D	L	GF	GA	GD	Pts	Qualification or relegation
1	Ferencváros (C)	33	23	9	1	69	22	+47	78	Qualification for the Champions League first qualifying round
2	Puskás Akadémia	33	18	4	11	52	42	+10	58	Qualification for the Europa Conference League first qualifying round
3	Fehérvár	33	16	8	9	68	38	+30	56	Qualification for the Europa Conference League first qualifying round
4	Paks	33	14	8	11	76	64	+12	50	
5	Kisvárda	33	12	10	11	30	36	−6	46	

Source: Hungarian Football Federation (in Hungarian), Soccerway
Rules for classification: 1) Points; 2) Matches won; 3) Goal difference; 4) Goals scored; 5) Head-to-head points; 6) Head-to-head goal difference; 7) Head-to-head away goals scored; 8) Fair play ranking; 9) Drawing of lots.
(C) Champions

==== Results summary ====
Overall								Home						Away					
Pld	W	D	L	GF	GA	GD	Pts	W	D	L	GF	GA	GD	W	D	L	GF	GA	GD
33	16	8	9	68	38	+30	56	7	5	4	33	17	+16	9	3	5	35	21	+14

Last updated: 9 May 2021.
Source: soccerway

==== Results by round ====
Round	1	2	3	4	5	6	7	8	9	10	11	12	13	14	15	16	17	18	19	20	21	22	23	24	25	26	27	28	29	30	31	32	33
Ground	A	H	A	H	A	H	A	A	H	A	H	H	A	H	H	H	A	H	H	A	H	H	A	H	A	A	A	H	A	A	H	A	A
Result	D	D	W	W	L	W	D	W	D	L	W	W	L	W	D	W	W	L	D	L	L	L	W	D	W	L	D	W	W	W	L	W	W
Position	4	6	2	1	2	1	2	2	2	4	3	2	2	2	2	2	2	2	2	3	3	3	3	3	3	3	3	3	3	3	3	3	3

Updated to match(es) played on 9 May 2021. Source: wikipedia
A = Away; H = Home; W = Win; D = Draw; L = Loss

==== Matches ====
15 August 2020 1	Zalaegerszeg	3–3	Fehérvár	Zalaegerszeg
18:35 CEST	Babati 2', 75' (pen.); Szépe 16'	Report	Evandro 11'; Nikolić 44' (pen.), 61'	Stadium: ZTE Arena; Attendance: 4,375; Referee: Gergő Bogár

22 August 2020 2	Fehérvár	1–1	Paks	Székesfehérvár
21:00 CEST	Hodžić 90+2'	Report	Szélpál 80'	Stadium: MOL Aréna Sóstó; Attendance: 3,231; Referee: Ferenc Karakó

30 August 2020 3	Budafok	1–4	Fehérvár	Budapest
17:45 CEST	Skribek 57'	Report	Négo 35', 66'; Nikolić 74'; Petryak 90+1'	Stadium: Promontor utcai Stadion; Attendance: 2,000; Referee: Péter Antal

12 September 2020 4	Fehérvár	3–1	Puskás Akadémia	Székesfehérvár
19:30 CEST	Nikolić 28'; Petryak 84'; Zivzivadze 90+1'	Report	Knežević 57'	Stadium: MOL Aréna Sóstó; Attendance: 3,011; Referee: Zoltán Iványi

27 January 2021 5	Kisvárda	2–1	Fehérvár	Kisvárda
17:45 CET	Lucas (yellow card) 5'; Sassá (yellow card) 20' (goal) 58'; Simović 22'; Matheus Leoni (yellow card) 26'; Hey (yellow card) 60'	Report	Fiola (yellow card) 25' (goal) 28'; Rus (yellow card) 36'; Stopira (yellow card) 83'	Stadium: Várkerti Stadion; Attendance: No Spectators; Referee: (Hungary) Sandor Ando-Szabor
Note: COVID-19 pandemic in Hungary

4 October 2020 6	Fehérvár	5–1	Újpest	Székesfehérvár
20:00 CEST	Stopira 58'; Bamgboye 61'; Zivzivadze 66'; Nikolov 68'; Ristevski 88' (o.g.)	Report	Beridze 90+2'	Stadium: MOL Aréna Sóstó; Attendance: 2,673; Referee: Ádám Farkas

18 October 2020 7	Honvéd	2–2	Fehérvár	Budapest
17.02 CEST	Balogh 46'; Traoré 74'		Négo 65'; Petryak 67'	Stadium: Hidegkuti Nándor Stadium; Attendance: 2,378; Referee: Ferenc Karakó

25 October 2020 8	Mezőkövesd	1–2	Fehérvár	Mezőkövesd
17:00 CET	Berecz 87' (pen.)	Report	Négo 32'; Houri 84' (pen.)	Stadium: Mezőkövesdi Városi Stadion; Attendance: 1,670; Referee: Balázs Berke

31 October 2020 9	Fehérvár	1–1	Ferencváros	Székesfehérvár
19:30 CET	Nikolić 55' (pen.)	Report	Somália 43'	Stadium: MOL Aréna Sóstó; Attendance: 7,229; Referee: Ferenc Karakó

7 November 2020 10	MTK Budapest	3–1	Fehérvár	Budapest
19:45 CET	Cseke 9' (pen.); Schön 64'; Miovski 66'	Report	Stopira 88'	Stadium: Hidegkuti Nándor Stadion; Attendance: 1,356; Referee: Gergő Bogár

22 November 2020 11	Fehérvár	3–0	Diósgyőr	Székesfehérvár
17:00 CET	Nikolić 36'; Zivzivadze 80'; Petryak 90+1' (pen.)	Report		Stadium: MOL Aréna Sóstó; Attendance: no spectators Referee: Tamás Bognár

28 November 2020 12	Fehérvár	2–0	Zalaegerszeg	Székesfehérvár
17:00 CET	Zivzivadze 12'; Houri 21'	Report		Stadium: MOL Aréna Sóstó; Attendance: no spectators Referee: József Erdős

6 December 2020 13	Paks	1–0	Fehérvár	Paks
17:30 CET	Ádám 89'	Report		Stadium: Fehérvári úti Stadion; Attendance: no spectators Referee: Péter Solymosi

12 December 2020 14	Fehérvár	4–1	Budafok	Székesfehérvár
19:30 CET	Alef 5'; Petryak 14', 36'; Rus 55'	Report	Kovács 90+2'	Stadium: MOL Aréna Sóstó; Attendance: no spectators Referee: Ádám Farkas

15 December 2020 15	Fehérvár	1–1	Puskás Akadémia	Székesfehérvár
20:15 CET	Bamgboye 59'	Report	Knežević 19'	Stadium: MOL Aréna Sóstó; Attendance: no spectators Referee: Gergő Bogár

18 December 2020 16	Fehérvár	3–0	Kisvárda	Székesfehérvár
20:00 CET	Bamgboye 8', 87'; Petryak 46'	Report		Stadium: MOL Aréna Sóstó; Attendance: no spectators Referee: Mihály Káprály

23 January 2021 17	Újpest	0–5	Fehérvár	Budapest
19:30 CET	Tallo (yellow card) 31'; Mitrović (yellow card) 65'; Bjeloš (yellow card) 69'; Stieber (yellow card) 71'; Antonov (yellow card) 84'	Report	Bamgboye 6' 19'; Zivzivadze 55'; Petryak 61'; Nikolić 81'	Stadium: Szusza Ferenc Stadion; Attendance: no spectators Referee: (Hungary) Mihály Káprály
Note: COVID-19 pandemic in Hungary

30 January 2021 18	Fehérvár	1–2	Honvéd	Székesfehérvár
19:30 CET	Dárdai 45'; Bamgboye (yellow card) 61'; Musliu (yellow card) 68'; Alef (yellow card) 78'	Report	Hidi 22' (yellow card) 33'; Nir Bardea (yellow card) 59'; Batik 80'; Tujvel (yellow card) 83'; Tamás (yellow card) 90'; Nagy (yellow card) 90+2'; Zsótér (yellow card) 90+4'	Stadium: MOL Aréna Sóstó; Attendance: No Spectators; Referee: (Hungary) Gergő Bogár
Note: COVID-19 pandemic in Hungary

2 February 2021 19	Fehérvár	0–0	Mezőkövesd	Székesfehérvár
20:00 CET		Report		Stadium: MOL Aréna Sóstó; Attendance: no spectators Referee: József Erdős
Note: COVID-19 pandemic in Hungary

7 February 2021 20	Ferencváros	2–0	Fehérvár	Budapest
18:30 CET	Uzuni 11'; Nguen 61'	Report		Stadium: Groupama Arena; Attendance: no spectators Referee: Balázs Berke
Note: COVID-19 pandemic in Hungary

14 February 2021 21	Fehérvár	1–2	MTK Budapest	Székesfehérvár
17:00 CET	Hangya 8'	Report	Miovski 52'; Varga 75' (pen.)	Stadium: MOL Aréna Sóstó; Attendance: no spectators Referee: Péter Antal
Note: COVID-19 pandemic in Hungary

20 February 2021 22	Fehérvár	1–3	Diósgyőr	Székesfehérvár
17:00 CEST	Stopira 9'	Report	Grozav 60', 61', 89'	Stadium: MOL Aréna Sóstó; Attendance: no spectators Referee: József Erdős
Note: COVID-19 pandemic in Hungary

28 February 2021 23	Zalaegerszeg	0–2	Fehérvár	Zalaegerszeg
17:00 CET		Report	Nikolić 64' (pen.); Négo 78'	Stadium: ZTE Arena; Attendance: no spectators Referee: Zoltán Iványi
Note: COVID-19 pandemic in Hungary

3 March 2021 24	Fehérvár	2–2	Paks	Székesfehérvár
20:00 CET	Petryak 11'; Zivzivadze 64'	Report	Haraszti 78', 85'	Stadium: MOL Aréna Sóstó; Attendance: no spectators Referee: István Vad
Note: COVID-19 pandemic in Hungary

7 March 2021 25	Budafok	1–2	Fehérvár	Budapest
20:00 CET	Skribek 41'	Report	Zivzivadze 17'; Zsóri 84' (o.g.)	Stadium: Promontor utcai Stadion; Attendance: no spectators Referee: Péter Zierkelbach
Note: COVID-19 pandemic in Hungary

14 March 2021 26	Puskás	1–0	Fehérvár	Felcsút
19:15 CET	Corbu (yellow card) 1'; Slagveer 68' (yellow card) 90+1'; Szolnoki (yellow card) 70'	Report	Bamgboye (yellow card) 77'; Houri (yellow card) 90+1'; Musliu (yellow card) 90+3'	Stadium: Pancho Aréna; Attendance: no spectators Referee: (Hungary) Peter Solymosi
Note: COVID-19 pandemic in Hungary

4 April 2021 27	Kisvárda	0–0	Fehérvár	Kisvárda
14:30 CET	Matheus Leoni (yellow card) 13'; Ene (yellow card) 15'; Bumba (yellow card) 49'; Hey (yellow card) 49'	Report	Fiola (yellow card) 19' (yellow-red card) 35'; Nikolić (yellow card) 37'; Stopira (yellow card) 88'	Stadium: Várkerti Stadion; Attendance: no spectators Referee: (Hungary) Csaba Pinter
Note: COVID-19 pandemic in Hungary

10 April 2021 28	Fehérvár	4–0	Újpest	Székesfehérvár
17:00 CET	Nikolić 8' (pen.) 33'; Petryak (yellow card) 67' (goal) 69' 87'; Rúben Pinto (yellow card) 70'	Report	Csongvai (yellow card) 8'; Onovo (yellow card) 26'	Stadium: MOL Aréna Sóstó; Attendance: no spectators Referee: (Hungary) Balazs Berke
Note: COVID-19 pandemic in Hungary

18 April 2021 29	Honvéd	2–3	Fehérvár	Budapest
17:30 CET	Balogh 25'; D. Nagy 41'		Nikolić 22' (pen.); Houri 78' (pen.); Négo 90'	Stadium: Hidegkuti Nándor Stadium; Attendance: no spectators Referee: Zoltán Iványi
Note: COVID-19 pandemic in Hungary

21 April 2021 30	Mezőkövesd	1–3	Fehérvár	Mezőkövesd
20:00 CET	Vutov 13'	Report	Bamgboye 59'; Dárdai 65'; Szabó 90+3'	Stadium: Mezőkövesdi Városi Stadion; Attendance: no spectators Referee: Tamás Bognár
Note: COVID-19 pandemic in Hungary

25 April 2021 31	Fehérvár	1–2	Ferencváros	Székesfehérvár
17:00 CEST	Nikolić 82'	Report	Zubkov 36', 54'	Stadium: MOL Aréna Sóstó; Attendance: no spectators Referee: Sándor Andó-Szabó
Note: COVID-19 pandemic in Hungary

29 April 2021 32	MTK Budapest	1–3	Fehérvár	Budapest
20:00 CEST	Ferreira 89'	Report	Nikolić 18'; Zivzivadze 76'; Houri 82'	Stadium: Hidegkuti Nándor Stadion; Attendance: no spectators Referee: József Erdős
Note: COVID-19 pandemic in Hungary

9 May 2021 33	Diósgyőr	0–4	Fehérvár	Miskolc
17:30 CEST		Report	Petryak 44'; Nikolić 55', 90'; Zivzivadze 79'	Stadium: DVTK Stadion; Attendance: 520; Referee: Péter Solymosi
Note: COVID-19 pandemic in Hungary

=== Hungarian Cup ===
20 September 2020 Round 6	Tiszaföldvár	0–5	Fehérvár	Tiszaföldvár
15:00 CEST		Report	Géresi 15'; Nikolić 33', 81'; Evandro 66'; Papp 82'	Stadium: Városi Sportpálya; Referee: Péter Antal

28 October 2020 Round of 64	Gárdony	1–4	Fehérvár	Agárd
12:30 CET	Tóth 48'	Report	Evandro 26'; Zivzivadze 30', 64'; Nikolić 90+1'	Stadium: Városi Sportpálya; Attendance: 1,200; Referee: Bálint Dolnegó

10 February 2021 Round of 32	Vasas	1–2	Fehérvár	Budapest
19:45 CET	Rus 34' (o.g.)	Report	Zivzivadze 3'; Petryak 23'	Stadium: Illovszky Rudolf Stadion; Attendance: 0
Note: COVID-19 pandemic in Hungary

24 February 2021 Round of 16	Ferencváros	1–2	Fehérvár	Budapest
17:30 CET	Stopira 13' (o.g.)	Report	Nikolić 17'; Stopira 40'	Stadium: Groupama Arena; Attendance: 0 Referee: Tamás Bognár
Note: COVID-19 pandemic in Hungary

10 March 2021 Quarter-final	Fehérvár	2–0	Budafok	Budapest
14:30 CET	Romić 68' (o.g.); Stopira 89'	Report		Stadium: Promontor utcai Stadion; Attendance: 0 Referee: Péter Solymosi
Note: COVID-19 pandemic in Hungary

15 April 2021 Semi-final	MTK	1–2	Fehérvár	Budapest
18:30 CET	Schön 14' (yellow card) 70'; Dimitrov (yellow card) 46'; Cseke (yellow card) 72'; Varga (yellow card) 85'	Report	Bolla 38'; Nikolić 52'; Bamgboye (yellow card) 74'; Rus (yellow card) 81'; Fiola (yellow card) 87'	Stadium: Hidegkuti Nándor Stadion; Attendance: 0 Referee: (Hungary) Adam Farkas
Note: COVID-19 pandemic in Hungary

3 May 2021 Final	Fehérvár	0–1 (a.e.t.)	Újpest	Budapest
20:00 CEST		Report	Kastrati 101'	Stadium: Puskás Aréna; Attendance: 4,500; Referee: Gergő Bogár
Note: COVID-19 pandemic in Hungary

=== UEFA Europa League ===
27 August 2020 First qualifying round	Fehérvár (Hungary)	1–1 (a.e.t.) (4–2 p)	(Republic of Ireland) Bohemians	Székesfehérvár, Hungary
18:30 CEST (UTC+2)	Nikolić 37' (pen.)	Report	Ward 22'	Stadium: MOL Aréna Sóstó; Attendance: 0 Referee: Timotheos Christofi (Cyprus)
	Penalties
	Hodžić (penalty missed); Nikolov (penalty scored); Géresi (penalty scored); Stopira (penalty scored); Houri (penalty scored)		(penalty scored) Mandroiu; (penalty scored) Conor Levingston; (penalty missed) Dan Casey; (penalty missed) Twardek

17 September 2020 Second qualifying round	Hibernians (Malta)	0–1	(Hungary) Fehérvár	Ta' Qali, Malta
19:00 CEST (UTC+2)		Report	Nikolov 61'	Stadium: Centenary Stadium; Attendance: 0 Referee: Ivaylo Stoyanov (Bulgaria)

24 September 2020 Third qualifying round	Fehérvár (Hungary)	0–0 (a.e.t.) (4–1 p)	(France) Reims	Székesfehérvár, Hungary
18:00 CEST (UTC+2)		Report		Stadium: MOL Aréna Sóstó; Attendance: 0 Referee: Matej Jug (Slovenia)
	Penalties
	Evandro (penalty scored); Stopira (penalty scored); Hodžić (penalty scored); Nego (penalty scored)		(penalty missed) Dia; (penalty missed) Abdelhamid; (penalty scored) Konan

1 October 2020 Play-off round	Standard Liège (Belgium)	3–1	(Hungary) Fehérvár	Liège, Belgium
20:00 CEST (UTC+2)	Gavory 51'; Amallah 77' (pen.), 85' (pen.)	Report	Nikolic 10'	Stadium: Stade Maurice Dufrasne; Attendance: 0 Referee: Willie Collum (Scotland)

== Statistics ==
=== Appearances and goals ===
Last updated on 9 May 2021.

No.	Pos	Nat	Player	Total		OTP Bank Liga		Europa League		Hungarian Cup	
No.	Pos	Nat	Player	Apps	Goals	Apps	Goals	Apps	Goals	Apps	Goals
1	GK	(Hungary) HUN	Dániel Kovács	18	-19	12	-14	0	0	6	-5
4	DF	(Romania) ROU	Adrián Rus	27	1	20	1	1	0	6	0
5	DF	(Hungary) HUN	Attila Fiola	38	1	28	1	4	0	6	0
6	DF	(North Macedonia) MKD	Visar Musliu	32	0	26	0	3	0	3	0
7	MF	(Ukraine) UKR	Ivan Petryak	42	13	33	12	4	0	5	1
8	MF	(Belgium) BEL	Samy Bourard	6	0	5	0	0	0	1	0
9	FW	(Georgia (country)) GEO	Budu Zivzivadze	40	12	31	9	3	0	6	3
10	MF	(Hungary) HUN	István Kovács	4	0	3	0	0	0	1	0
11	DF	(Hungary) HUN	Loïc Nego	37	6	28	6	4	0	5	0
17	FW	(Hungary) HUN	Nemanja Nikolić	40	22	31	15	3	2	6	5
20	FW	(Brazil) BRA	Evandro	13	3	8	1	3	0	2	2
21	MF	(Portugal) POR	Rúben Pinto	24	0	18	0	0	0	6	0
22	DF	(Cape Verde) CPV	Stopira	40	5	31	3	4	0	5	2
23	MF	(Hungary) HUN	Palkó Dárdai	16	2	14	2	0	0	2	0
27	FW	(Hungary) HUN	Levente Szabó	15	1	13	1	0	0	2	0
42	GK	(Serbia) SRB	Emil Rockov	19	-19	18	-19	0	0	1	0
65	DF	(Hungary) HUN	Szilveszter Hangya	31	1	25	1	2	0	4	0
70	FW	(Nigeria) NGR	Funsho Bamgboye	40	7	31	7	2	0	7	0
74	GK	(Hungary) HUN	Ádám Kovácsik	9	-9	4	-5	4	-4	1	0
77	DF	(Hungary) HUN	Bendegúz Bolla	37	1	27	0	3	0	7	1
95	MF	(Brazil) BRA	Alef	27	1	22	1	2	0	3	0
96	MF	(France) FRA	Lyes Houri	41	4	32	4	4	0	5	0
Youth players:
14	DF	(Hungary) HUN	Gábor Vágó	1	0	0	0	0	0	1	0
19	MF	(Hungary) HUN	Péter Kövesdi	0	0	0	0	0	0	0	0
68	MF	(Hungary) HUN	Ádám Halmai	0	0	0	0	0	0	0	0
85	MF	(Hungary) HUN	Olivér Dinnyés	2	0	0	0	0	0	2	0
86	MF	(Hungary) HUN	Attila Tóth	2	0	0	0	0	0	2	0
88	FW	(Hungary) HUN	Marcell Papp	2	1	0	0	0	0	2	1
97	GK	(Romania) ROU	Árpád Tordai	0	0	0	0	0	0	0	0
Out to loan:
15	FW	(Bosnia and Herzegovina) BIH	Armin Hodžić	7	1	4	1	3	0	0	0
24	MF	(Hungary) HUN	Patrik Nyári	2	0	2	0	0	0	0	0
44	DF	(Hungary) HUN	Márió Zeke	3	0	1	0	0	0	2	0
49	MF	(Hungary) HUN	Krisztián Géresi	9	1	6	0	1	0	2	1
Players no longer at the club:
8	MF	(North Macedonia) MKD	Boban Nikolov	13	2	9	1	4	1	0	0
17	MF	(Hungary) HUN	Máté Pátkai	5	0	2	0	2	0	1	0

=== Top scorers ===
Includes all competitive matches. The list is sorted by shirt number when total goals are equal.

Last updated on 9 May 2021

Position	Nation	Number	Name	OTP Bank Liga	UEFA Europa League	Hungarian Cup	Total
1	(Hungary)	71	Nemanja Nikolić	15	2	5	22
2	(Ukraine)	7	Ivan Petryak	12	0	1	13
3	(Georgia (country))	9	Budu Zivzivadze	9	0	3	12
4	(Nigeria)	70	Funsho Bamgboye	7	0	0	7
5	(Hungary)	11	Loïc Négo	6	0	0	6
6	(Cape Verde)	22	Stopira	3	0	2	5
7	(France)	96	Lyes Houri	4	0	0	4
8	(Brazil)	20	Evandro	1	0	2	3
9	(North Macedonia)	8	Boban Nikolov	1	1	0	2
10	(Hungary)	23	Palkó Dárdai	2	0	0	2
11	(Bosnia and Herzegovina)	15	Armin Hodžić	1	0	0	1
12	(Brazil)	95	Alef	1	0	0	1
13	(Romania)	4	Adrián Rus	1	0	0	1
14	(Hungary)	5	Attila Fiola	1	0	0	1
15	(Hungary)	65	Szilveszter Hangya	1	0	0	1
16	(Hungary)	27	Levente Szabó	1	0	0	1
17	(Hungary)	49	Krisztián Géresi	0	0	1	1
18	(Hungary)	88	Marcell Papp	0	0	1	1
19	(Hungary)	77	Bendegúz Bolla	0	0	1	1
/	/	/	Own Goals	2	0	1	3
			TOTALS	68	3	17	88

=== Disciplinary record ===
Includes all competitive matches. Players with 1 card or more included only.

Last updated on 9 May 2021

Position	Nation	Number	Name	OTP Bank Liga		UEFA Europa League		Hungarian Cup		Total (Hu Total)	
Position	Nation	Number	Name	Yellow card	Red card	Yellow card	Red card	Yellow card	Red card	Yellow card	Red card
GK	(Hungary)	1	Dániel Kovács	1	0	0	0	1	0	2 (1)	0 (0)
DF	(Romania)	4	Adrián Rus	4	1	0	0	2	1	6 (4)	2 (1)
DF	(Hungary)	5	Attila Fiola	9	1	1	0	2	0	12 (9)	1 (1)
DF	(North Macedonia)	6	Visar Musliu	7	0	0	0	0	0	7 (7)	0 (0)
MF	(Ukraine)	7	Ivan Petryak	3	0	0	0	1	0	4 (3)	0 (0)
MF	(North Macedonia)	8	Boban Nikolov	5	0	0	0	0	0	5 (5)	0 (0)
MF	(Hungary)	11	Loïc Négo	4	0	1	0	0	0	5 (4)	0 (0)
FW	(Bosnia and Herzegovina)	15	Armin Hodžić	1	0	0	0	0	0	1 (1)	0 (0)
FW	(Hungary)	17	Nemanja Nikolić	3	0	1	0	1	0	5 (3)	0 (0)
FW	(Brazil)	20	Evandro	2	0	1	0	0	0	3 (2)	0 (0)
MF	(Portugal)	21	Rúben Pinto	2	0	0	0	1	0	3 (2)	0 (0)
DF	(Cape Verde)	22	Stopira	3	0	2	0	0	0	5 (3)	0 (0)
MF	(Hungary)	23	Palkó Dárdai	1	0	0	0	0	0	1 (1)	0 (0)
DF	(Hungary)	65	Szilveszter Hangya	2	0	1	0	1	0	4 (2)	0 (0)
FW	(Nigeria)	70	Funsho Bamgboye	9	0	0	0	2	0	11 (9)	0 (0)
GK	(Hungary)	74	Ádám Kovácsik	0	0	1	0	0	0	1 (0)	0 (0)
DF	(Hungary)	77	Bendegúz Bolla	4	0	0	0	0	0	4 (4)	0 (0)
MF	(Brazil)	95	Alef	2	1	0	0	0	1	2 (2)	2 (1)
MF	(France)	96	Lyes Houri	5	0	0	0	0	0	5 (5)	0 (0)
			TOTALS	67	3	8	0	11	2	86 (67)	5 (3)

=== Overall ===
Games played	44 (33 OTP Bank Liga, 4 UEFA Europa League and 7 Hungarian Cup)
Games won	23 (16 OTP Bank Liga, 1 UEFA Europa League and 6 Hungarian Cup)
Games drawn	10 (8 OTP Bank Liga, 2 UEFA Europa League and 0 Hungarian Cup)
Games lost	11 (9 OTP Bank Liga, 1 UEFA Europa League and 1 Hungarian Cup)
Goals scored	88
Goals conceded	47
Goal difference	+41
Yellow cards	86
Red cards	5
Worst discipline	(Hungary) Attila Fiola (12 (yellow card) , 1 (red card) )
Best result	5–0 (A) v Tiszaföldvár - Hungarian Cup - 20-9-2020
Best result	5–0 (A) v Újpest - Nemzeti Bajnokság I - 23-1-2021
Worst result	1–3 (A) v Standard Liège - UEFA Europa League - 1-10-2020
Worst result	1–3 (A) v MTK Budapest - Nemzeti Bajnokság I - 7-11-2020
Worst result	1–3 (H) v Diósgyőr - Nemzeti Bajnokság I - 20-2-2021
Most appearances	(Ukraine) Ivan Petryak (42 appearances)
Top scorer	(Hungary) Nemanja Nikolić (22 goals)
Points	79/132 (59.84%)

Last updated: 9 May 2021
