= Gabriel Iancu =

Romanian footballer (born 1994)

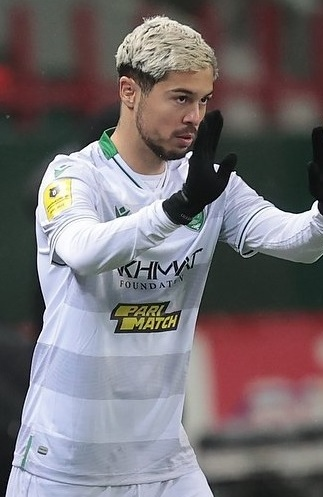
- Iancu with Akhmat Grozny in 2021

Personal information
- Full name: Gabriel Cristian Iancu
- Date of birth: 15 April 1994 (age 32)
- Place of birth: Bucharest, Romania
- Height: 1.86 m (6 ft 1 in)
- Positions: Forward; attacking midfielder

Team information
- Current team: Terrassa

Youth career
- 2001–2006: Steaua București
- 2006–2009: CSȘ Pajura
- 2009–2011: Gheorghe Hagi Academy

Senior career*
Years	Team	Apps	(Gls)
2011–2012	Viitorul Constanța	30	(11)
2013–2016	Steaua București	54	(8)
2015–2016	→ Karabükspor (loan)	4	(1)
2016–2017	Viitorul Constanța	24	(5)
2017–2018	Termalica Nieciecza	14	(2)
2018–2019	Voluntari	1	(0)
2019	Dunărea Călărași	12	(2)
2019–2021	Viitorul Constanța	37	(22)
2021–2023	Akhmat Grozny	12	(1)
2022	→ Farul Constanța (loan)	11	(1)
2022–2023	→ FC U Craiova (loan)	15	(2)
2023	→ Hermannstadt (loan)	9	(1)
2023–2024	Hermannstadt	34	(5)
2024–2026	Farul Constanța	30	(2)
2026	Concordia Chiajna	6	(1)
2026–	Terrassa	0	(0)

International career^{‡}
2010–2011	Romania U17	3	(2)
2012	Romania U19	3	(0)
2012–2014	Romania U21	8	(2)
2020	Romania	4	(0)
- * Club domestic league appearances and goals as of 10 October 2026 ‡ National team caps and goals as of 14 October 2020

Gabriel Cristian Iancu (Romanian pronunciation: [gabriˈel kristiˈan ˈjaŋku]; born 15 April 1994) is a Romanian professional footballer who plays as a forward or an attacking midfielder for Segunda Federación – Group 2 club Terrassa.

Iancu began his senior career at Viitorul Constanța in 2011, and at age 18 returned to Steaua București where he was previously a junior. He won six trophies with the latter, but has since had multiple brief spells since leaving the capital in 2015. On his second stint at Viitorul, Iancu aided to a league title in the 2016–17 season, and on his third netted 18 times to become the top scorer of the 2019–20 Liga I. He has competed professionally in three countries apart from his own, namely Turkey, Poland and Russia.

Internationally, Iancu represented the Romania national team at several youth levels including the under-21 side, before going on to record his debut for the seniors in 2020.

== Club career ==
=== Viitorul Constanța ===
Iancu made his senior debut for Viitorul Constanța on 1 September 2011, in a 2–0 Liga II home win over Callatis Mangalia. In March 2012, he and his Viitorul teammate Bogdan Țîru were on trial at Ajax, and he was also linked with a move to Galatasaray.

Iancu's first goal also came in a match against Callatis Mangalia, scoring the last of his team in a 5–1 away thrashing on 21 April 2012. By the end of the season which ended in promotion to the Liga I, he totalled five goals in twelve appearances.

=== Steaua București ===
Iancu continued his goalscoring run by netting six times from 18 games in the first half of the 2012–13 Liga I, which inspired a move to his former boyhood club FC Steaua București in the winter transfer window. The eventual champions acquired 70% of his economic rights for a rumoured €500,000 fee, and his five-year contract included a €25 million buyout clause.

On 30 July 2013, Iancu scored the goals of a 2–0 away victory over Georgian side Dinamo Tbilisi, facilitating Steaua's progression to the UEFA Champions League play-off round. He played two matches in the group stage of the latter competition, as Steaua finished last behind Chelsea, Schalke 04 and Basel, respectively.

==== Loan to Karabükspor ====
Iancu did not impose himself at the Bucharest-based club and in the 2015–16 campaign was sent out on loan to Karabükspor in Turkey, where he only scored once in four games.

=== Return to Viitorul Constanța ===
In the summer of 2016, Iancu rejoined Viitorul Constanța as a free agent. On 13 May 2017, he converted a penalty in a 1–0 defeat of CFR Cluj, which earned Viitorul its first national title.

=== Termalica Nieciecza ===
In September 2017, Iancu joined Polish club Termalica Nieciecza on a two-year deal. Two weeks later, he made his Ekstraklasa debut by coming on as a substitute and scoring the winner in a 2–1 victory against Lechia Gdańsk.

=== Return to Romania ===
Iancu returned to Romania for the 2018–19 season, playing in quick succession for Voluntari and Dunărea Călărași before being once again re-signed by Viitorul Constanța in June 2019. He managed to become top scorer of the 2019–20 Liga I by netting 18 goals from 28 appearances.

=== Akhmat Grozny ===
Iancu earned a €500,000 transfer to Akhmat Grozny on 13 January 2021, signing a three-and-a-half-year contract with the Russian Premier League club.

==== Various loans ====
On 3 February 2022, Iancu returned for a third time to Viitorul, now renamed Farul Constanța, on loan for the remainder of the season.

On 20 July 2022, Iancu signed for FC U Craiova after his loan at Farul expired. On 13 February 2023, Iancu joined Hermannstadt until the end of the 2022–23 season.

=== Hermannstadt ===
On 10 June 2023, Iancu returned to Hermannstadt on a permanent basis and signed a two-year contract.

== International career ==
On 7 September 2020, Iancu made his debut for the Romania national team by coming on for injured Ciprian Deac in the 40th minute of a 3–2 away win over Austria in the UEFA Nations League.

== Personal life ==
Iancu has been married since 2019, with the couple having one son who was born the following year.

== Career statistics ==
=== Club ===
As of match played 10 October 2026

Appearances and goals by club, season and competition
Club	Season	League			National cup (Note: Includes Cupa României, Turkish Cup, Russian Cup)		League cup (Note: Includes Cupa Ligii)		Continental		Other		Total	
Club	Season	Division	Apps	Goals	Apps	Goals	Apps	Goals	Apps	Goals	Apps	Goals	Apps	Goals
Viitorul Constanța	2011–12	Liga II	12	5	0	0	—		—		—		12	5
Viitorul Constanța	2012–13	Liga I	18	6	0	0	—		—		—		18	6
Viitorul Constanța	Total		30	11	0	0	—		—		—		30	11
Steaua București	2012–13	Liga I	10	2	0	0	—		0	0	—		10	2
Steaua București	2013–14	Liga I	19	2	2	0	—		8 (Note: Appearances in UEFA Champions League)	2	1 (Note: Appearance in Supercupa României)	0	30	4
Steaua București	2014–15	Liga I	20	3	3	4	2	1	6 (Note: Four appearances and one goal in UEFA Champions League, two appearances in UEFA Europa League)	1	1	0	32	9
Steaua București	2015–16	Liga I	5	1	0	0	0	0	3 (Note: One appearance in UEFA Champions League, two appearances in UEFA Europa League)	0	1	0	9	1
Steaua București	Total		54	8	5	4	2	1	17	3	3	0	81	16
Karabükspor (loan)	2015–16	TFF 1. Lig	4	1	3	1	—		—		—		7	2
Viitorul Constanța	2016–17	Liga I	24	5	2	1	1	0	2 (Note: Appearances in UEFA Europa League)	0	0	0	29	6
Termalica Nieciecza	2017–18	Ekstraklasa	14	2	0	0	—		—		—		14	2
Voluntari	2018–19	Liga I	1	0	0	0	—		—		—		1	0
Dunărea Călărași	2018–19	Liga I	12	2	1	0	—		—		—		13	2
Viitorul Constanța	2019–20	Liga I	28	18	0	0	—		2	2	1	0	31	20
Viitorul Constanța	2020–21	Liga I	9	4	1	0	—		—		—		10	4
Viitorul Constanța	Total		37	22	1	0	—		2	2	1	0	41	24
Akhmat Grozny	2020–21	Russian Premier League	6	0	1	0	—		—		—		7	0
Akhmat Grozny	2021–22	Russian Premier League	6	1	1	1	—		—		—		7	2
Akhmat Grozny	Total		12	1	2	1	—		—		—		14	2
Farul Constanța (loan)	2021–22	Liga I	11	1	—		—		—		—		11	1
FC U Craiova (loan)	2022–23	Liga I	15	2	2	1	—		—		—		17	3
Hermannstadt (loan)	2022–23	Liga I	9	1	1	0	—		—		—		10	1
Hermannstadt	2023–24	Liga I	34	5	4	1	—		—		—		38	6
Hermannstadt	Total		43	6	5	1	—		—		—		48	7
Farul Constanța	2024–25	Liga I	20	2	3	0	—		—		—		23	2
Farul Constanța	2025–26	Liga I	10	0	2	0	—		—		—		12	0
Farul Constanța	Total		30	2	5	0	—		—		—		35	2
Concordia Chiajna	2026–27	Liga II	6	1	2	0	—		—		—		8	1
Terrassa	2026–27	Segunda Federación	0	0	—		—		—		—		0	0
Career total			293	64	28	9	3	1	21	5	4	0	349	79

=== International ===
As of match played 14 October 2020

Appearances and goals by national team and year
National team	Year	Apps	Goals
Romania	2020	4	0
Total		4	0

== Honours ==
Steaua București

- Liga I: 2012–13, 2013–14, 2014–15
- Cupa României: 2014–15; runner-up: 2013–14
- Cupa Ligii: 2014–15
- Supercupa României: 2013

Viitorul Constanța

- Liga I: 2016–17
- Supercupa României: 2019

Individual

- Liga I top scorer: 2019–20
- Liga I Team of the Season: 2019–20
