= Sebastian Mladen =

Romanian footballer

Personal information
- Date of birth: 11 December 1991 (age 34)
- Place of birth: Calafat, Romania
- Height: 1.85 m (6 ft 1 in)
- Positions: Defender; defensive midfielder

Team information
- Current team: Athens Kallithea
- Number: 5

Youth career
- –2007: Dunărea Calafat
- 2007–2008: Şcoala de Fotbal Gheorghe Popescu
- 2008–2011: Roma

Senior career*
Years	Team	Apps	(Gls)
2011–2015	Roma	0	(0)
2011–2012	→ Chindia Târgoviște (loan)	20	(0)
2012–2013	→ Viitorul Constanța (loan)	20	(0)
2013–2014	→ Olhanense (loan)	16	(0)
2014–2015	→ Südtirol (loan)	35	(0)
2015–2016	Südtirol	28	(0)
2017–2021	Viitorul Constanța	133	(2)
2021–2022	Farul Constanța	36	(0)
2022–2026	Panetolikos	86	(1)
2026–	Athens Kallithea	0	(0)

International career
2007–2008	Romania U17	3	(0)
2008–2009	Romania U19	6	(0)
2009–2012	Romania U21	5	(0)
- * Club domestic league appearances and goals as of 17 May 2026

Sebastian Mladen (born 11 December 1991) is a Romanian professional footballer who plays as a defender or a defensive midfielder for Super League Greece 2 club Athens Kallithea.

== Career statistics ==
As of match played 17 August 2026

Appearances and goals by club, season and competition
Club	Season	League			National cup (Note: Includes Taça de Portugal, Coppa Italia, Cupa României, Greek Cup)		Europe		Other		Total	
Club	Season	Division	Apps	Goals	Apps	Goals	Apps	Goals	Apps	Goals	Apps	Goals
Chindia Targoviște (loan)	2011–12	Liga II	20	0	—		—		—		20	0
Olhanense (loan)	2013–14	Primeira Liga	16	0	1	0	—		—		17	0
Südtirol (loan)	2014–15	Lega Pro	35	0	0	0	—		—		35	0
Südtirol	2015–16	Lega Pro	28	0	2	0	—		—		30	0
Südtirol	Total		63	0	2	0	—		—		65	0
Viitorul Constanța (loan)	2012–13	Liga I	20	0	—		—		—		20	0
Viitorul Constanța	2016–17	Liga I	2	0	—		—		—		2	0
Viitorul Constanța	2017–18	Liga I	34	1	—		2 (Note: One appearance in UEFA Champions League, one appearance in UEFA Europa League)	0	0	0	36	1
Viitorul Constanța	2018–19	Liga I	30	1	3	0	4 (Note: Appearances in UEFA Europa League)	0	—		37	1
Viitorul Constanța	2019–20	Liga I	32	0	—		2	1	1 (Note: Appearance in Supercupa României)	0	35	1
Viitorul Constanța	2020–21	Liga I	35	0	0	0	—		2 (Note: Appearances in Liga I play-offs for UEFA Europa Conference League)	0	37	0
Viitorul Constanța	Total		133	2	3	0	8	1	3	0	147	3
Farul Constanța	2021–22	Liga I	32	0	1	0	—		—		33	0
Farul Constanța	2022–23	Liga I	4	0	—		—		—		4	0
Farul Constanța	Total		36	0	1	0	—		—		37	0
Panetolikos	2022–23	Super League Greece	31	0	0	0	—		—		31	0
Panetolikos	2023–24	Super League Greece	22	1	4	0	—		—		26	1
Panetolikos	2024–25	Super League Greece	24	0	1	0	—		—		25	0
Panetolikos	2025–26	Super League Greece	9	0	0	0	—		—		9	0
Panetolikos	Total		86	1	5	0	—		—		91	1
Athens Kallithea	2026–27	Super League Greece 2	0	0	1	0	—		—		1	0
Career total			374	3	13	0	8	1	3	0	398	4

== Honours ==
Viitorul Constanța

- Liga I: 2016–17
- Cupa României: 2018–19
- Supercupa României: 2019

Farul Constanța

- Liga I: 2022–23
