= George Ganea =

Romanian footballer

Personal information
- Full name: George Dănuț Ganea
- Date of birth: 26 May 1999 (age 27)
- Place of birth: Bucharest, Romania
- Height: 1.79 m (5 ft 10 in)
- Position: Forward

Team information
- Current team: Concordia Chiajna
- Number: 28

Youth career
- 2012–2014: Universitatea Cluj
- 2014–2015: Dinamo București
- 2016–2017: Virtus Entella
- 2017–2018: Roma

Senior career*
Years	Team	Apps	(Gls)
2015–2016	Rapid București	13	(3)
2018–2019	CFR Cluj	0	(0)
2019–2021	Viitorul Constanța	66	(8)
2021–2022	Farul Constanța	14	(2)
2022	→ Argeș Pitești (loan)	13	(1)
2022–2023	FC U Craiova	28	(4)
2023–2025	Újpest	35	(0)
2026	ASA Târgu Mureș	8	(0)
2026–	Concordia Chiajna	8	(2)

International career
2014–2015	Romania U16	3	(2)
2015–2016	Romania U17	7	(0)
2016	Romania U18	1	(0)
2019–2021	Romania U21	9	(1)
2021	Romania Olympic	6	(2)
- * Club domestic league appearances and goals as of 1 November 2026

George Dănuț Ganea (born 26 May 1999) is a Romanian professional footballer who plays as a forward for Liga II club Concordia Chiajna.

== Personal life ==
George Ganea is the son of former Romanian international Ionel Ganea.

== Career statistics ==
As of match played 1 November 2026

Appearances and goals by club, season and competition
Club	Season	League			National cup (Note: Includes Cupa României, Magyar Kupa)		Europe		Other		Total	
Club	Season	Division	Apps	Goals	Apps	Goals	Apps	Goals	Apps	Goals	Apps	Goals
Rapid Bucuresti	2015–16	Liga II	13	3	0	0	—		—		13	3
CFR Cluj	2018–19	Liga I	0	0	1	0	—		—		1	0
Viitorul Constanța	2018–19	Liga I	7	2	1	0	—		—		8	2
Viitorul Constanța	2019–20	Liga I	29	4	1	0	2 (Note: Appearances in UEFA Europa League)	0	1 (Note: Appearance in Supercupa României)	0	33	4
Viitorul Constanța	2020–21	Liga I	30	2	1	0	—		—		31	2
Viitorul Constanța	Total		66	8	3	0	2	0	1	0	72	8
Farul Constanța	2021–22	Liga I	14	2	0	0	—		—		14	2
Argeș Pitești (loan)	2021–22	Liga I	13	1	2	0	—		—		15	1
FC U Craiova	2022–23	Liga I	28	4	5	0	—		2 (Note: Appearance in Liga I play-offs for UEFA Europa Conference League)	0	33	4
Újpest	2023–24	Nemzeti Bajnokság I	24	0	2	0	—		—		26	0
Újpest	2024–25	Nemzeti Bajnokság I	4	0	0	0	—		—		4	0
Újpest	2025–26	Nemzeti Bajnokság I	7	0	0	0	—		—		7	0
Újpest	Total		35	0	2	0	—		—		37	0
ASA Târgu Mureș	2025–26	Liga II	8	0	—		—		—		8	0
Concordia Chiajna	2026–27	Liga II	8	2	3	1	—		—		11	3
Career total			185	20	16	1	2	0	3	0	206	21

== Honours ==
Rapid București

- Liga II: 2015–16

Viitorul Constanța

- Cupa României: 2018–19
- Supercupa României: 2019
