= Alexi Pitu =

Romanian footballer (born 2002)

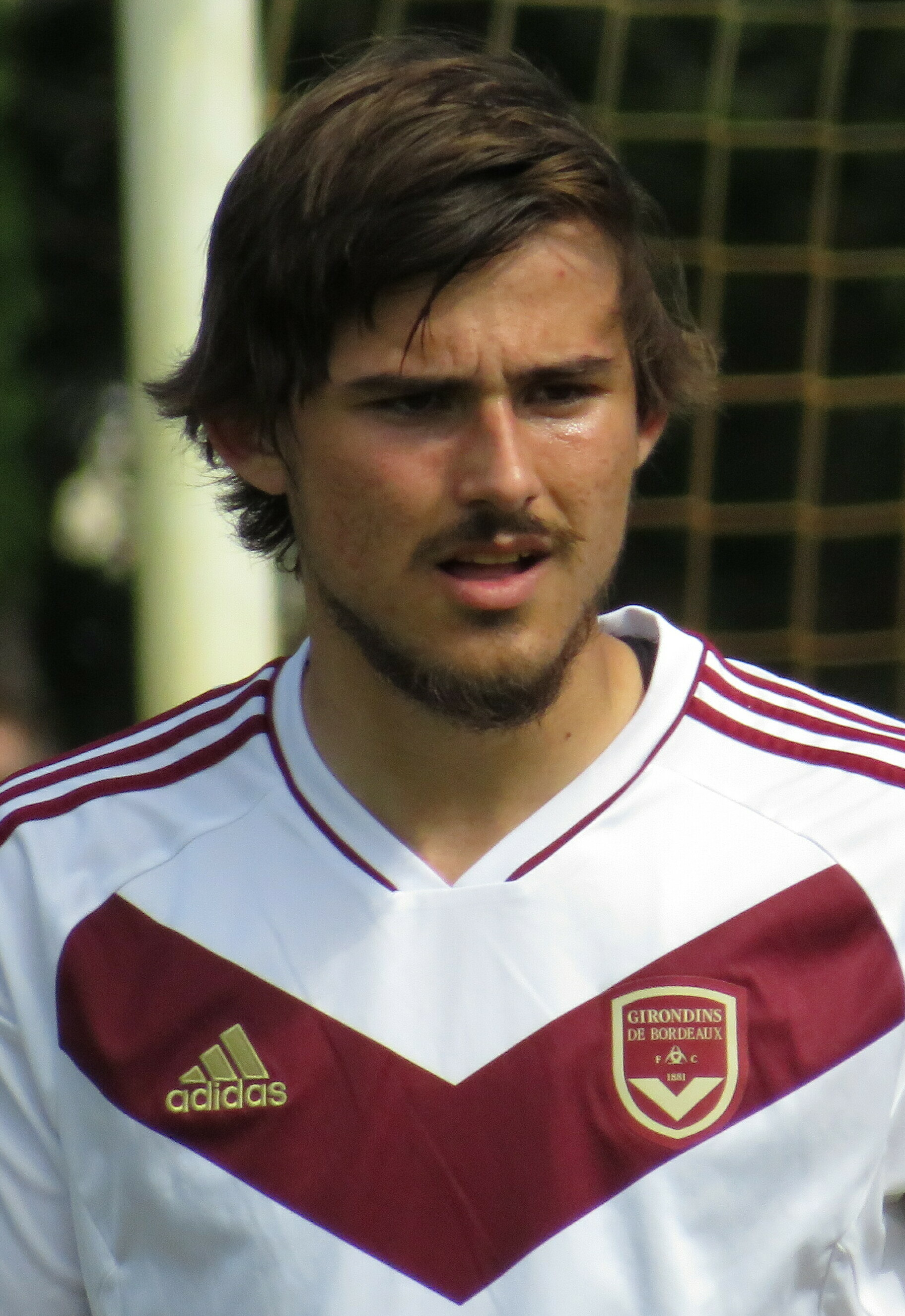
- Pitu with Bordeaux in 2023

Personal information
- Full name: Alexi Paul Pitu
- Date of birth: 5 June 2002 (age 24)
- Place of birth: Karlsruhe, Germany
- Height: 1.78 m (5 ft 10 in)
- Positions: Attacking midfielder; winger

Team information
- Current team: UTA Arad
- Number: 80

Youth career
- 2010–2018: Gheorghe Hagi Academy

Senior career*
Years	Team	Apps	(Gls)
2018–2021	Viitorul Constanța	31	(0)
2021–2023	Farul Constanța	52	(5)
2023–2024	Bordeaux	41	(1)
2025	Dunkerque	5	(0)
2025–2026	Vejle	8	(0)
2026–	UTA Arad	4	(0)

International career^{‡}
2017–2018	Romania U16	5	(1)
2017–2019	Romania U17	13	(5)
2019–2020	Romania U18	4	(0)
2022	Romania U20	2	(0)
2021–2023	Romania U21	8	(0)
- * Club domestic league appearances and goals as of 7 August 2026 ‡ National team caps and goals as of 28 June 2023

Alexi Paul Pitu (born 5 June 2002) is a Romanian professional footballer who plays as an attacking midfielder or a winger for Liga I club UTA Arad.

Pitu started out as a senior in 2018 at Viitorul Constanța, which was merged into Farul Constanța three years later. He totalled over 80 matches in the Liga I combined, before earning a move to French side Bordeaux in 2023.

Internationally, Pitu has represented Romania at several youth levels.

== Club career ==
=== Viitorul Constanța / Farul Constanța ===
Pitu made his senior debut for Viitorul Constanța on 12 July 2018, coming on as an 86th-minute substitute for Ianis Hagi in a 2–0 win over Racing FC in the first qualifying round of the UEFA Europa League. Aged 16 and one month, he thus became the youngest Romanian player to make an appearance in a European club competition. Ten days later, he recorded his Liga I debut by playing in a 0–1 loss to Dunărea Călărași.

Pitu became a regular starter at the team after it merged with Farul Constanța in the summer of 2021, amassing 32 league games in the 2021–22 season. On 28 August 2022, he scored his first professional goal in a 3–1 away defeat of five-time defending champions CFR Cluj.

=== Bordeaux ===
On 26 January 2023, French team Bordeaux announced the signing of Pitu on a four-and-a-half-year contract, with the transfer fee rumoured to be worth around €2 million. Two days later, he made his Ligue 2 debut by entering as a 72nd-minute substitute for Josh Maja in a 3–0 away victory over Dijon.

Pitu scored his first goal on 16 September 2023, in a 2–1 away league win over Valenciennes.

=== Dunkerque ===
On 19 January 2025, Pitu signed a two-and-a-half-year contract with Dunkerque in Ligue 2.

=== Vejle Boldklub ===
On 7 August 2025, Pitu signed a contract with Danish Superliga team Vejle Boldklub. Just 3 days later he made his debut as a substitute in a 1-2 goal defeat to Brøndby IF.

== International career ==
On 3 March 2023, Pitu received a preliminary call-up to the Romania senior team for the UEFA Euro 2024 qualification matches against Andorra and Belarus, but did not make the final list. Three months later, he was named by Emil Săndoi in the Romania under-21 squad for the 2023 UEFA European Championship.

== Personal life ==
Pitu was born in Karlsruhe, Germany, where his parents were working, he later re-located back to Romania, to attend the Gheorghe Hagi Football Academy, at age 8. Pitu's paternal uncle, Adrian, was also a professional footballer.

== Career statistics ==
As of match played 7 August 2026

Appearances and goals by club, season and competition
Club	Season	League			National cup (Note: Includes Cupa României, Coupe de France)		Continental		Other		Total	
Club	Season	Division	Apps	Goals	Apps	Goals	Apps	Goals	Apps	Goals	Apps	Goals
Viitorul Constanța	2018–19	Liga I	5	0	0	0	2 (Note: Appearances in UEFA Europa League)	0	—		7	0
Viitorul Constanța	2019–20	Liga I	9	0	1	0	0	0	0	0	10	0
Viitorul Constanța	2020–21	Liga I	17	0	0	0	—		—		17	0
Viitorul Constanța	Total		31	0	1	0	2	0	0	0	34	0
Farul Constanța	2021–22	Liga I	32	0	0	0	—		—		32	0
Farul Constanța	2022–23	Liga I	20	5	0	0	—		—		20	5
Farul Constanța	Total		52	5	0	0	—		—		52	5
Bordeaux	2022–23	Ligue 2	16	0	—		—		—		16	0
Bordeaux	2023–24	Ligue 2	25	1	3	0	—		—		28	1
Bordeaux	Total		41	1	3	0	—		—		44	1
Dunkerque	2024–25	Ligue 2	5	0	0	0	—		0	0	5	0
Vejle	2025–26	Danish Superliga	8	0	4	4	—		—		12	4
UTA Arad	2026–27	Liga I	4	0	0	0	—		—		4	0
Career total			141	6	8	4	2	0	0	0	151	10

== Honours ==
Viitorul Constanța

- Cupa României: 2018–19
- Supercupa României: 2019

Farul Constanța

- Liga I: 2022–23
