= 2019 Supercupa României =

- Event: 2019 Supercupa României
CFR Cluj	Viitorul Constanța
Liga I	Cupa României
0	1
- Date: 6 July 2019
- Venue: Ilie Oană Stadium, Ploiești
- Man of the Match: Andrei Artean (Viitorul Constanța)
- Referee: Sebastian Colţescu
- Attendance: 7,218
- Weather: Clear

The 2019 Supercupa României was the 21st edition of Romania's season opener cup competition. The game was contested between Liga I title holders, CFR Cluj, and Romanian Cup holders, Viitorul Constanța. It was played at Ilie Oană Stadium in Ploiești in July.

Viitorul Constanța won the trophy for the first time in history, with only one goal scored by Andrei Artean.

== Teams ==
Team	Qualification	Previous participations (bold indicates winners)
CFR Cluj	Winners of the 2018–19 Liga I	5 (**2009**, **2010**, 2012, 2016, **2018**)
Viitorul Constanța	Winners of the 2018–19 Cupa României	1 (2017)

== Venue ==
On 22 May 2019 it was announced that the Supercup might be played on the newly built stadium Tudor Vladimirescu in Târgu Jiu, Romania. Later, FRF announced that the SuperCup will be played at Ilie Oană Stadium in Ploiești.

== Match ==
=== Details ===
6 July 2019
20:00 EEST (UTC+03)

CFR Cluj	0–1	Viitorul Constanța
	Report 1 Report 2 Report 3	Artean 86'

Ilie Oană Stadium, Ploiești
Attendance: 7,218
Referee: Sebastian Colţescu

**CFR Cluj**	**Viitorul Constanța**

GK	87	(Lithuania) Giedrius Arlauskis
RB	77	(Romania) Andrei Peteleu
CB	55	(Brazil) Paulo Vinícius
CB	30	(Romania) Andrei Mureșan
LB	45	(Portugal) Camora (c)	(yellow card) 90'
RCM	37	(Romania) Mihai Bordeianu
CM	8	(Croatia) Damjan Djoković	(yellow card) 28'
LCM	94	(Romania) Cătălin Itu		(substituted off) 46'
RW	10	(Romania) Ciprian Deac
CF	9	(Algeria) Billel Omrani	(yellow card) 12'	(substituted off) 75'
LW	18	(Romania) Valentin Costache		(substituted off) 70'
Substitutes:
DF	3	(Romania) Andrei Burcă
MF	7	(Romania) Alexandru Păun
GK	12	(Romania) Cosmin Vâtcă
DF	16	(Bosnia and Herzegovina) Mateo Sušić
MF	19	(Argentina) Emmanuel Culio		(substituted on) 46'
FW	20	(Romania) George Țucudean		(substituted on) 75'
MF	62	(Romania) Claudiu Petrila		(substituted on) 70'
Manager:
(Romania) Dan Petrescu

GK	1	(Romania) Árpád Tordai
RB	5	(Romania) Sebastian Mladen
CB	15	(Romania) Bogdan Țîru (c)
CB	21	(Romania) Paul Iacob	(yellow card) 41'
LB	6	(Netherlands) Bradley de Nooijer		(substituted off) 73'
RCM	19	(France) Lyes Houri
CM	18	(Romania) Andrei Artean	86'
LCM	11	(Romania) Ionuț Vînă
AM	28	(Romania) Alexandru Mățan
FW	9	(Romania) Gabriel Iancu	(yellow card) 50'	(substituted off) 61'
FW	99	(Romania) George Ganea		(substituted off) 72'
Substitutes:
DF	4	(Netherlands) Bas Kuipers		(substituted on) 73'
GK	12	(Romania) Valentin Cojocaru
MF	20	(Romania) Andrei Tîrcoveanu
DF	25	(Romania) Marius Leca		(substituted on) 72'
MF	30	(Romania) Andreias Calcan		(substituted on) 61'
MF	77	(Romania) Vlad Achim
MF	80	(Romania) Alexi Pitu
Manager:
(Romania) Gheorghe Hagi

**Man of the match**

- (Romania) Andrei Artean

**Match officials**

- Assistant referees:
  - Ovidiu Artene
  - Daniel Mitruți
- Fourth official:
  - George Găman
- Additional assistant referees:
  - Ciprian Paraschiv
  - Aron Huzu

**Match rules**

- 90 minutes.
- Penalty shoot-out if score's still level.
- Seven named substitutes.
- Maximum of three substitutions.

=== Statistics ===
Overall
Statistic	CFR Cluj	Viitorul Constanța
Goals scored	0	1
Total shots	16	10
Shots on target	8	3
Ball possession	48%	52%
Corner kicks	5	3
Fouls committed	18	18
Offsides	3	0
Yellow cards	3	2
Red cards	0	0

== See also ==
- 2019–20 Liga I
- 2019–20 Cupa României
