= Bogdan Lazăr =

Romanian footballer

Personal information
- Full name: Bogdan Gheorghe Lazăr
- Date of birth: 26 June 2003 (age 23)
- Place of birth: Alba Iulia, Romania
- Height: 1.82 m (6 ft 0 in)
- Position: Centre back

Team information
- Current team: CSU Alba Iulia (on loan from Farul Constanța)
- Number: 21

Youth career
- –2022: Gheorghe Hagi Academy

Senior career*
Years	Team	Apps	(Gls)
2020–2021	Viitorul Constanța	2	(0)
2022–	Farul Constanța	0	(0)
2023–2024	→ Argeș Pitești (loan)	1	(0)
2024–	→ CSU Alba Iulia (loan)	10	(1)

International career
2018	Romania U15	10	(0)
2019–2020	Romania U17	7	(1)
2021	Romania U18	2	(0)
2021	Romania U19	9	(1)
- * Club domestic league appearances and goals as of 18:10, 23 December 2024 (UTC)

Bogdan Gheorghe Lazăr (born 26 June 2003) is a Romanian professional footballer who plays as a right back for Liga III club CSU Alba Iulia, on loan from Farul Constanța.

== Club career ==
=== Viitorul Constanta ===
He made his league debut on 1 August 2020 in Liga I match against Sepsi OSK.

== Career statistics ==
As of match played 18 August 2023

Appearances and goals by club, season and competition
Club	Season	League			Cupa României		Europe		Other		Total	
Club	Season	Division	Apps	Goals	Apps	Goals	Apps	Goals	Apps	Goals	Apps	Goals
Viitorul Constanța	2019–20	Liga I	2	0	0	0	0	0	0	0	2	0
Argeș Pitești (loan)	2023–24	Liga II	1	0	1	0	—		—		2	0
Career total			3	0	1	0	0	0	0	0	4	0

== Honours ==
Viitorul Constanța U19

- Liga Elitelor U19: 2018–19, 2019–20
