= Lyes Houri =

French footballer (born 1996)

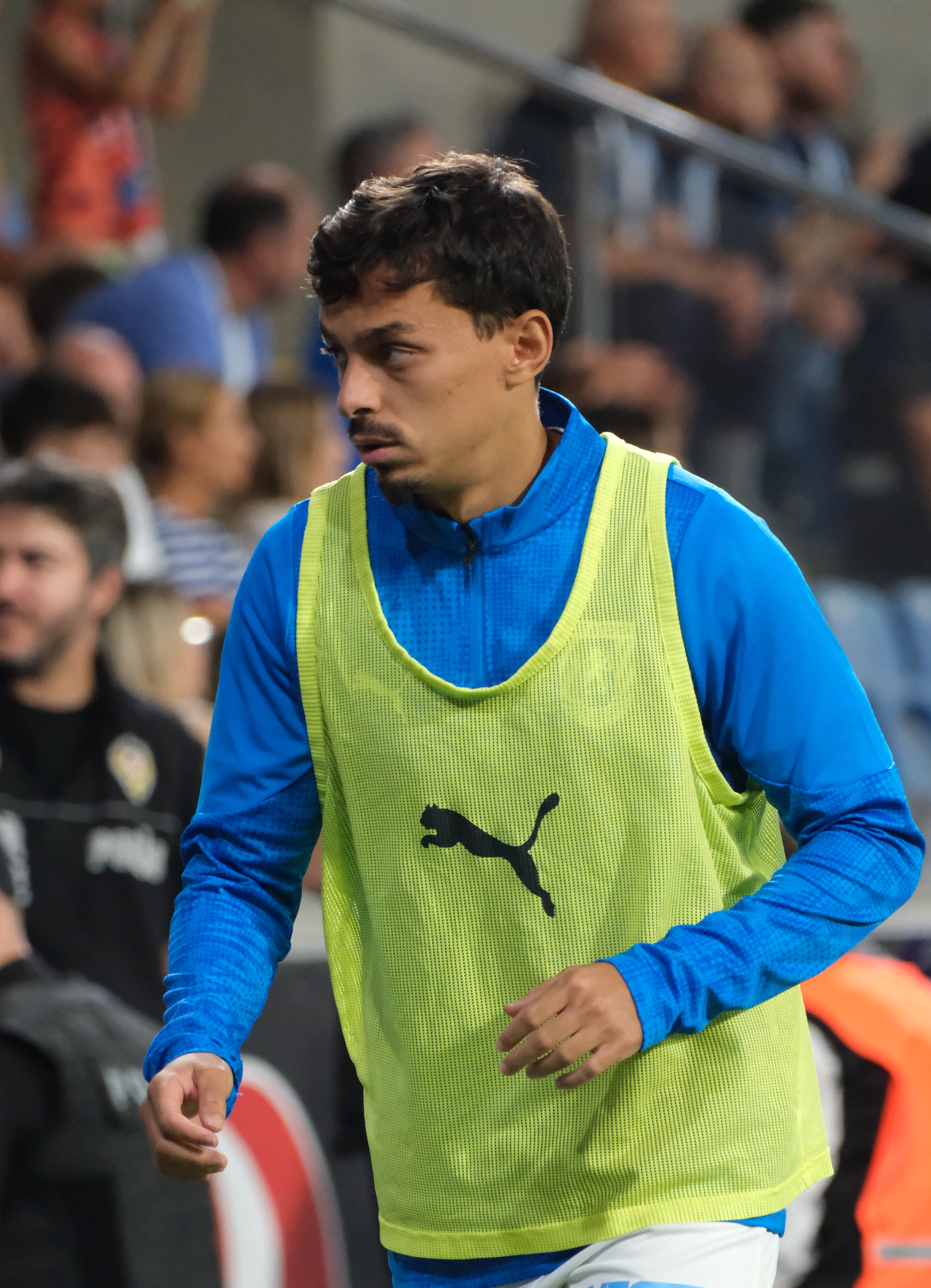
- Lyes Houri with Universitatea Craiova in 2025

Personal information
- Full name: Lyes Hafid Houri
- Date of birth: 19 January 1996 (age 30)
- Place of birth: Lomme, France
- Height: 1.66 m (5 ft 5 in)
- Position: Midfielder

Team information
- Current team: Dinamo Tbilisi
- Number: 33

Youth career
- 2003–2007: Lille
- 2007–2011: Wasquehal
- 2011–2013: Valenciennes

Senior career*
Years	Team	Apps	(Gls)
2013–2015	Valenciennes B	31	(6)
2014–2015	Valenciennes	12	(0)
2015–2017	Bastia	2	(0)
2015–2016	Bastia B	20	(4)
2016	→ Belfort (loan)	14	(3)
2017	→ Roda JC (loan)	0	(0)
2017–2018	Lens B	21	(3)
2018–2020	Viitorul Constanța	46	(4)
2020–2023	Fehérvár	68	(5)
2021–2022	→ Universitatea Craiova (loan)	9	(1)
2023–2026	Universitatea Craiova	73	(4)
2026–	Dinamo Tbilisi	2	(0)

International career
2012	France U16	7	(0)
2012–2013	France U17	9	(1)
2014–2015	France U19	6	(0)
- * Club domestic league appearances and goals as of 17 August 2026

Lyes Hafid Houri (Arabic: لياس حوري; born 19 January 1996) is a French professional footballer who plays as a midfielder for Dinamo Tbilisi.

== Club career ==
Houri is a youth exponent from Valenciennes FC. He made his Ligue 2 debut on 1 August 2014 against Gazélec Ajaccio in a 0–2 away defeat.

He joined Ligue 1 club SC Bastia in February 2015, on a 3.5-year contract. After lacking first-team playing time, he was loaned in February 2016 to third-division team ASM Belfort. He was once again loaned the following season to Eredivisie team Roda JC Kerkrade.

On 20 July 2026, Dinamo Tbilisi announced the signing of Houri on a contract until the end of the 2027 season.

== International career ==
Born in France to an Algerian mother and Moroccan father, Houri is eligible for all three national teams. He represented the former country at youth level, earning caps for the under-16, under-17 and under-18 sides.

== Career statistics ==
As of match played 13 March 2026.

Appearances and goals by club, season and competition
Club	Season	League			National cup (Note: Includes Coupe de France, Cupa României, Magyar Kupa)		Europe		Other		Total	
Club	Season	Division	Apps	Goals	Apps	Goals	Apps	Goals	Apps	Goals	Apps	Goals
Valenciennes B	2012–13	CFA	12	1	—		—		—		12	1
Valenciennes B	2013–14	CFA 2	15	2	—		—		—		15	2
Valenciennes B	2014–15	CFA 2	4	3	—		—		—		4	3
Valenciennes B	Total		31	6	—		—		—		31	6
Valenciennes	2014–15	Ligue 2	12	0	0	0	—		1 (Note: Appearances in Coupe de la Ligue)	0	13	0
Valenciennes	Total		12	0	0	0	0	0	1	0	13	0
Bastia	2014–15	Ligue 1	1	0	0	0	—		—		1	0
Bastia	2015–16	Ligue 1	1	0	0	0	—		—		1	0
Bastia	Total		2	0	0	0	—		0	0	2	0
Bastia B	2014–15	CFA 2	8	1	—		—		—		8	1
Bastia B	2015–16	CFA 2	4	0	—		—		—		4	0
Bastia B	2016–17	CFA 2	8	3	—		—		—		8	3
Bastia B	Total		20	4	—		—		—		20	4
Belfort (loan)	2015–16	National 1	14	3	0	0	—		—		14	3
Roda JC (loan)	2016–17	Eredivisie	0	0	0	0	—		—		0	0
Lens B	2017–18	National 2	21	3	—		—		—		21	3
Viitorul Constanța	2018–19	Liga I	25	3	5	1	4 (Note: Appearances in UEFA Europa League)	0	—		34	4
Viitorul Constanța	2019–20	Liga I	21	1	0	0	2	0	1 (Note: Appearance in Supercupa României)	0	24	1
Viitorul Constanța	Total		46	4	5	1	6	0	1	0	58	5
Fehérvár	2019–20	Nemzeti Bajnokság I	17	1	6	1	0	0	—		23	2
Fehérvár	2020–21	Nemzeti Bajnokság I	32	4	5	0	4	0	—		41	4
Fehérvár	2021–22	Nemzeti Bajnokság I	0	0	0	0	2 (Note: Appearance(s) in UEFA Conference League)	0	—		2	0
Fehérvár	2022–23	Nemzeti Bajnokság I	17	0	0	0	0	0	—		17	0
Fehérvár	2023–24	Nemzeti Bajnokság I	2	0	—		—		—		2	0
Fehérvár	Total		68	5	11	1	6	0	0	0	85	6
Universitatea Craiova (loan)	2021–22	Liga I	9	1	2	1	—		0	0	11	2
Universitatea Craiova	2023–24	Liga I	25	3	2	0	—		1 (Note: Appearance in Liga I play-offs for UEFA Europa Conference League)	1	28	4
Universitatea Craiova	2024–25	Liga I	32	1	3	1	1	0	—		36	2
Universitatea Craiova	2025–26	Liga I	16	0	2	0	10	0	—		28	0
Universitatea Craiova	Total		73	4	7	1	11	0	1	1	92	6
Career total			296	30	25	4	23	0	3	1	347	35

== Honours ==
Bastia

- Coupe de la Ligue runner-up: 2014–15

Fehérvár

- Magyar Kupa runner-up: 2020–21

Viitorul Constanța

- Cupa României: 2018–19
- Supercupa României: 2019

Universitatea Craiova

- Liga I: 2025–26
- Cupa României: 2025–26
