= Darius Grosu =

Romanian footballer

Personal information
- Full name: Darius Constantin Grosu
- Date of birth: 7 June 2002 (age 24)
- Place of birth: Constanța, Romania
- Height: 1.73 m (5 ft 8 in)
- Position: Right-back

Team information
- Current team: AFC Câmpulung Muscel (on loan from Farul Constanța)
- Number: 6

Youth career
- –2020: Gheorghe Hagi Academy

Senior career*
| Years | Team | Apps | (Gls) |
| 2020–2021 | Viitorul Constanța | 2 | (0) |
| 2021– | Farul Constanța | 3 | (0) |
| 2021–2023 | → Metaloglobus București (loan) | 24 | (0) |
| 2024–2025 | → Gloria Buzău (loan) | 1 | (0) |
| 2025 | → Metalul Buzău (loan) | 4 | (0) |
| 2025– | → AFC Câmpulung Muscel (loan) | 22 | (0) |

International career
| 2018 | Romania U16 | 4 | (0) |
| 2018–2019 | Romania U17 | 8 | (0) |
| 2019–2020 | Romania U18 | 5 | (0) |
| 2021–2022 | Romania U20 | 8 | (0) |
- * Club domestic league appearances and goals as of 2 May 2026

Darius Constantin Grosu (Romanian pronunciation: [ˈdari.us konstanˈtin ˈɡrosu]; born 7 June 2002) is a Romanian professional footballer who plays as a right-back for Liga III club Câmpulung Muscel, on loan from Liga I club Farul Constanța.

== Club career ==
=== Viitorul Constanta ===
He made his league debut on 17 June 2020 in Liga I match against Chindia.

== Career statistics ==
As of match played 2 May 2026

Appearances and goals by club, season and competition
| Club | Season | League | | | Cupa României | | Europe | | Other | | Total | |
| Club | Season | Division | Apps | Goals | Apps | Goals | Apps | Goals | Apps | Goals | Apps | Goals |
|---|---|---|---|---|---|---|---|---|---|---|---|---|
| Viitorul Constanța | 2019–20 | Liga I | 2 | 0 | 0 | 0 | — | | — | | 2 | 0 |
| Farul Constanța | 2021–22 | Liga I | 1 | 0 | — | | — | | — | | 1 | 0 |
| Farul Constanța | 2022–23 | Liga I | 0 | 0 | — | | — | | — | | 0 | 0 |
| Farul Constanța | 2023–24 | Liga I | 2 | 0 | 3 | 0 | 0 | 0 | 0 | 0 | 5 | 0 |
| Farul Constanța | Total | | 3 | 0 | 3 | 0 | 0 | 0 | 0 | 0 | 6 | 0 |
| Metaloglobus București (loan) | 2021–22 | Liga II | 17 | 0 | — | | — | | — | | 17 | 0 |
| Metaloglobus București (loan) | 2022–23 | Liga II | 7 | 0 | 0 | 0 | — | | — | | 7 | 0 |
| Metaloglobus București (loan) | Total | | 24 | 0 | 0 | 0 | — | | — | | 24 | 0 |
| Gloria Buzău (loan) | 2024–25 | Liga I | 1 | 0 | — | | — | | — | | 1 | 0 |
| Metalul Buzău (loan) | 2024–25 | Liga II | 4 | 0 | 1 | 0 | — | | — | | 5 | 0 |
| AFC Câmpulung Muscel (loan) | 2025–26 | Liga II | 22 | 0 | 2 | 0 | — | | — | | 24 | 0 |
| Career total | | | 56 | 0 | 6 | 0 | 0 | 0 | 0 | 0 | 62 | 0 |

== Honours ==
Farul Constanța

- Liga I: 2022–23
- Supercupa României runner-up: 2023
