= Andrei Artean =

Romanian footballer

Personal information
- Full name: Andrei Viorel Artean
- Date of birth: 14 August 1993 (age 33)
- Place of birth: Hunedoara, Romania
- Height: 1.86 m (6 ft 1 in)
- Positions: Defensive midfielder; defender

Team information
- Current team: Politehnica Timișoara
- Number: 18

Youth career
- –2010: FC Hunedoara
- 2010–2012: Politehnica Timișoara

Senior career*
Years	Team	Apps	(Gls)
2012–2018	ACS Poli Timișoara	90	(5)
2013–2015	→ FC Caransebeș (loan)	23	(4)
2016	→ CSM Râmnicu Vâlcea (loan)	16	(1)
2018–2021	Viitorul Constanța	90	(2)
2021–2024	Farul Constanța	96	(6)
2024	Apollon Limassol	20	(1)
2024–2025	CFR Cluj	15	(0)
2025–2026	Universitatea Cluj	32	(0)
2026–	Politehnica Timișoara	10	(1)
- * Club domestic league appearances and goals as of 31 October 2026

Andrei Viorel Artean (born 14 August 1993) is a Romanian professional footballer who plays for as a defensive midfielder or a defender for Liga II club Politehnica Timișoara, which he captains.

== Career ==
After coming through the ranks for the historic FC Politehnica Timișoara, Artean moved to the club formed in 2012, renamed ACS Poli Timișoara. Having made his debut in the second league for the team in the 2012–2013 season, he was loaned out for two years to FC Caransebeș. The midfielder then returned to Poli in the summer of 2015 and played his first Liga I match against ASA Târgu Mureș.

== Career statistics ==
As of match played 31 October 2026

Appearances and goals by club, season and competition
Club	Season	League			National cup (Note: Includes Cupa României, Cypriot Cup)		Europe		Other		Total	
Club	Season	Division	Apps	Goals	Apps	Goals	Apps	Goals	Apps	Goals	Apps	Goals
ACS Poli Timișoara	2012–13	Liga II	9	0	—		—		—		9	0
ACS Poli Timișoara	2015–16	Liga I	7	0	3	0	—		2 (Note: Appearances in Cupa Ligii)	0	12	0
ACS Poli Timișoara	2016–17	Liga I	38	2	3	0	—		6 (Note: Four appearances and three goals in Cupa Ligii, two appearances in Liga I promotion/relegation play-offs)	3	47	5
ACS Poli Timișoara	2017–18	Liga I	36	3	2	0	—		—		38	3
ACS Poli Timișoara	Total		90	5	8	0	—		8	3	106	8
FC Caransebeș (loan)	2013–14	Liga III	?	?	?	?	—		—		?	?
FC Caransebeș (loan)	2014–15	Liga II	23	4	1	0	—		—		24	4
FC Caransebeș (loan)	Total		23	4	1	0	—		—		24	4
CSM Râmnicu Vâlcea (loan)	2015–16	Liga II	16	1	—		—		—		16	1
Viitorul Constanța	2018–19	Liga I	24	0	3	0	1 (Note: Appearances in UEFA Europa League)	0	—		28	0
Viitorul Constanța	2019–20	Liga I	37	0	0	0	2	0	1 (Note: Appearances in Supercupa României)	1	40	1
Viitorul Constanța	2020–21	Liga I	29	2	1	0	—		2 (Note: Appearances in Liga I European play-offs)	1	32	3
Viitorul Constanța	Total		90	2	4	0	3	0	3	2	100	4
Farul Constanța	2021–22	Liga I	36	0	1	0	—		—		37	0
Farul Constanța	2022–23	Liga I	40	3	3	0	—		—		43	3
Farul Constanța	2023–24	Liga I	20	3	0	0	8 (Note: Two appearances in UEFA Champions League, six appearances in UEFA Conference League)	0	1	0	29	3
Farul Constanța	Total		96	6	4	0	8	0	1	0	109	6
Apollon Limassol	2023–24	Cypriot First Division	20	1	2	0	—		—		22	1
CFR Cluj	2024–25	Liga I	15	0	3	0	5 (Note: Appearances in UEFA Conference League)	0	—		23	0
Universitatea Cluj	2024–25	Liga I	19	0	—		—		—		19	0
Universitatea Cluj	2025–26	Liga I	13	0	1	0	2	0	—		16	0
Universitatea Cluj	Total		32	0	1	0	2	0	—		35	0
Politehnica Timișoara	2026–27	Liga I	10	1	1	0	—		—		11	1
Career total			392	20	24	0	18	0	12	5	446	25

== Honours ==
FC Caransebeș

- Liga III: 2013–14

ACS Poli Timisoara

- Cupa Ligii runner-up: 2016–17

Viitorul Constanța

- Cupa României: 2018–19
- Supercupa României: 2019

Farul Constanța

- Liga I: 2022–23
- Supercupa României runner-up: 2023

Universitatea Cluj

- Cupa României runner-up: 2025–26
