= Cosmin Bîrnoi =

Romanian footballer

Personal information
- Full name: Cosmin Marian Bîrnoi
- Date of birth: 17 September 1997 (age 29)
- Place of birth: Hunedoara, Romania
- Height: 1.81 m (5 ft 11 in)
- Position: Midfielder

Team information
- Current team: ASA Târgu Mureș
- Number: 17

Youth career
- Primavera Deva
- –2016: ACS Poli Timișoara

Senior career*
Years	Team	Apps	(Gls)
2016–2019	ACS Poli Timișoara	55	(4)
2019	Politehnica Iași	6	(0)
2020	Viitorul Constanța	1	(0)
2020–2021	Farul Constanța	23	(2)
2021–2023	ASU Politehnica Timișoara	46	(9)
2023–2024	Unirea Slobozia	6	(1)
2024	Unirea Dej	10	(2)
2024–2025	Unirea Ungheni	25	(1)
2025–	ASA Târgu Mureș	21	(6)
- * Club domestic league appearances and goals as of 9 May 2026

Cosmin Marian Bîrnoi (born 17 September 1997) is a Romanian professional footballer who plays as a midfielder for Liga II club ASA Târgu Mureș.

== Honours ==
ACS Poli Timișoara

- Cupa Ligii runner-up: 2016–17
