= Bogdan Țîru =

Romanian footballer (born 1994)

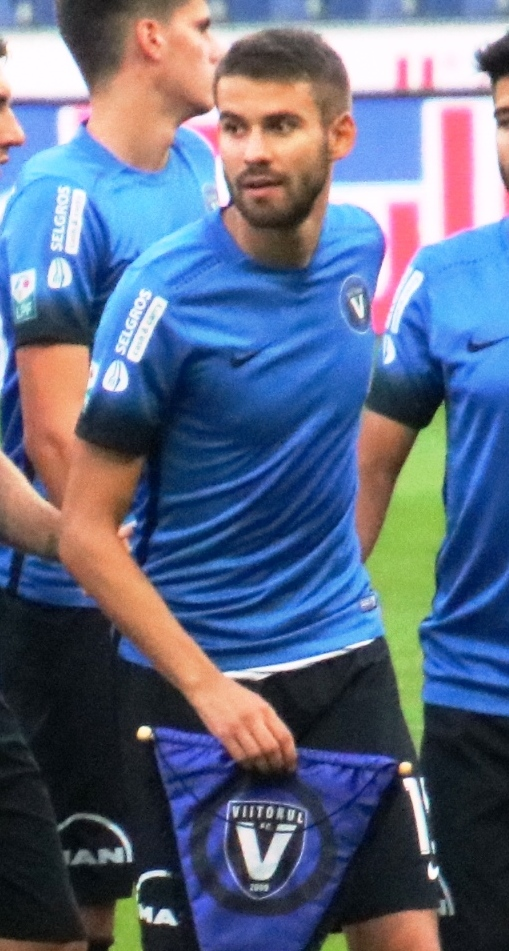
- Țîru with Viitorul Constanța in 2017

Personal information
- Full name: Bogdan Ionuț Țîru
- Date of birth: 15 March 1994 (age 32)
- Place of birth: Constanța, Romania
- Height: 1.85 m (6 ft 1 in)
- Position: Centre-back

Team information
- Current team: Cultural Leonesa
- Number: 24

Youth career
- 2003–2005: Farul Constanța
- 2005–2006: FC Constanța
- 2006–2009: Elpis Constanța
- 2009–2012: Gheorghe Hagi Academy

Senior career*
Years	Team	Apps	(Gls)
2011–2020	Viitorul Constanța	151	(6)
2013	→ Voluntari (loan)	8	(0)
2016	→ Voluntari (loan)	14	(1)
2020–2023	Jagiellonia Białystok	76	(3)
2023	CFR Cluj	7	(0)
2023–2024	Warta Poznań	25	(0)
2024–2026	Farul Constanța	50	(2)
2026–	Cultural Leonesa	0	(0)

International career
2010–2011	Romania U17	9	(0)
2011	Romania U19	1	(0)
2011–2012	Romania U19	8	(0)
2014–2016	Romania U21	11	(2)
2016–2017	Romania	2	(0)
- * Club domestic league appearances and goals as of 18 May 2026

Bogdan Ionuț Țîru (Romanian pronunciation: [boɡˈdan joˈnuts ˈtsɨru]; born 15 March 1994) is a Romanian professional footballer who plays as a centre-back for Primera Federación club Cultural Leonesa.

== International career ==
In November 2016 Țîru received his first call-up to the senior Romania squad for matches against Poland and Russia. He made a debut on 15 November 2016 against Russia.

== Career statistics ==
=== Club ===
As of match played on 18 May 2026

Appearances and goals by club, season and competition
Club	Season	League			National cup (Note: Includes Cupa României, Polish Cup)		League cup (Note: Includes Cupa Ligii)		Continental		Other		Total	
Club	Season	Division	Apps	Goals	Apps	Goals	Apps	Goals	Apps	Goals	Apps	Goals	Apps	Goals
Viitorul Constanța	2010–11	Liga II	1	0	—		—		—		—		1	0
Viitorul Constanța	2012–13	Liga I	1	0	1	0	—		—		—		2	0
Viitorul Constanța	2013–14	Liga I	10	0	—		—		—		—		10	0
Viitorul Constanța	2014–15	Liga I	31	2	2	1	2	0	—		—		35	3
Viitorul Constanța	2015–16	Liga I	3	0	1	0	0	0	—		—		4	0
Viitorul Constanța	2016–17	Liga I	33	1	1	0	0	0	1 (Note: Appearance(s) in UEFA Europa League)	0	—		35	1
Viitorul Constanța	2017–18	Liga I	28	0	1	0	—		4 (Note: Two appearances in UEFA Champions League, two appearances in UEFA Europa League)	0	1 (Note: Appearance in Supercupa României)	0	34	0
Viitorul Constanța	2018–19	Liga I	25	0	3	0	—		4	0	—		32	0
Viitorul Constanța	2019–20	Liga I	19	3	1	0	—		2	2	1	0	23	5
Viitorul Constanța	Total		151	6	10	1	2	0	11	2	2	0	176	9
Voluntari (loan)	2015–16	Liga I	14	1	—		—		—		2 (Note: Appearances in Liga I promotion/relegation play-offs)	0	16	1
Jagiellonia Białystok	2019–20	Ekstraklasa	11	1	—		—		—		—		11	1
Jagiellonia Białystok	2020–21	Ekstraklasa	25	2	1	0	—		—		—		26	2
Jagiellonia Białystok	2021–22	Ekstraklasa	25	0	1	0	—		—		—		26	0
Jagiellonia Białystok	2022–23	Ekstraklasa	15	0	2	0	—		—		—		17	0
Jagiellonia Białystok	Total		76	3	4	0	—		—		—		80	3
CFR Cluj	2022–23	Liga I	5	0	2	0	—		0	0	1 (Note: Appearance in Liga I European play-offs)	0	8	0
CFR Cluj	2023–24	Liga I	2	0	0	0	—		0	0	—		2	0
CFR Cluj	Total		7	0	2	0	—		0	0	1	0	10	0
Warta Poznań	2023–24	Ekstraklasa	25	0	3	0	—		—		—		28	0
Farul Constanța	2024–25	Liga I	21	1	4	0	—		—		—		25	1
Farul Constanța	2025–26	Liga I	29	1	0	0	—		—		—		29	1
Farul Constanța	2026–27	Liga I	0	0	0	0	—		—		—		0	0
Farul Constanța	Total		50	2	4	0	—		—		—		54	2
Cultural Leonesa	2026–27	Primera Federación	0	0	0	0	—		—		—		0	0
Career total			323	12	23	1	2	0	11	2	5	0	364	15

=== International ===
As of match played on 28 July 2020

Appearances and goals by national team and year
National team	Year	Apps	Goals
Romania	2016	1	0
Romania	2017	1	0
Total		2	0

== Honours ==
Viitorul Constanța

- Liga I: 2016–17
- Cupa României: 2018–19
- Supercupa României: 2019
