= Marius Leca =

Romanian footballer

Personal information
- Full name: Marius Sebastian Leca
- Date of birth: 6 July 2000 (age 26)
- Place of birth: Ovidiu, Romania
- Height: 1.81 m (5 ft 11 in)
- Position: Defender

Youth career
- –2019: Gheorghe Hagi Academy

Senior career*
Years	Team	Apps	(Gls)
2019–2021	Viitorul Constanța	1	(0)
2020–2021	→ Farul Constanța (loan)	24	(1)
2021	Unirea Constanța	4	(0)
2021–2022	Dunărea Călărași	19	(0)
2022–2023	Afumați		
2023	NEROCA	1	(0)
2024–	FC Romania	3	(0)

International career
2017–2018	Romania U18	4	(0)
2018–2019	Romania U19	6	(0)
2022	Romania U21	1	(0)
- * Club domestic league appearances and goals as of 21:54, 29 October 2023 (UTC)

Marius Sebastian Leca (born 6 July 2000) is a Romanian professional footballer who plays as a defender for FC Romania.

== Club career ==
In October 2023, Leca joined Indian I-League club NEROCA on a season-long deal.

In July 2024, Leca joined English Spartan South Midlands Football League Premier Division club FC Romania.

== Honours ==
Viitorul Constanța

- Cupa României: 2018–19
- Supercupa României: 2019

Afumați

- Liga III: 2022–23
