= Ciprian Paraschiv =

Romanian footballer and politician (born 1974)

Member of the Chamber of Deputies
- Incumbent
- Assumed office 21 December 2024
- Constituency: Iași County

Personal details
- Born: 14 November 1974 (age 51) Iași, Romania
- Party: Alliance for the Union of Romanians (since 2024)
- Occupation: Footballer • Politician

Ciprian-Constantin Paraschiv (born 14 November 1974) is a Romanian university professor, footballer and politician who from 2014 to 2020 served as a board member of the Romanian Football Federation. In 2024, he was elected a member of the Chamber of Deputies for the Alliance for the Union of Romanians.

== Football career ==
Paraschiv had a significant political career before arriving at Poli Iași. He was the advisor to MEP for Democratic Liberal Party (PDL) Mihaela Popa from 2007 to 2009, later moving to the Romanian capital Bucharest. After the DLP, by then known as the Liberal Democratic party (PLD) party came to power, he continued to hold government positions in the sports and administrative fields. Paraschiv resigned from the PDL on 4 May 2012.

Among the positions he held were director of the County Department for Sport and Youth Iași, coordinator of the Moldavia Region for Sport and Youth, as well as director in the Romanian Football Federation (FRF). He was also a member of European working groups on sports issues and national committees.

Paraschiv was a close associate of the president of the Romanian Football Federation, Răzvan Burleanu, since his first campaign in 2014. Once installed at the helm of the Federation, Burleanu immediately appointed Paraschiv as the development director. After six years spent at the top of Romanian football, Paraschiv, a former team captain of Politehnica Iași, returned to Iași, becoming the executive president at Poli.

In November 2020, Paraschiv was elected as the representative of the clubs in CASA Liga I to the Executive Committee of the Romanian Football Federation alongside Valeriu Argăseală. In 2021, after a conflict with the mayor of Iași, Mihai Chirica, Paraschiv was removed from the leadership of the Copou group, but regained the position following a legal trial.

== Political career ==
=== Member of the Chamber of Deputies (2024–present) ===
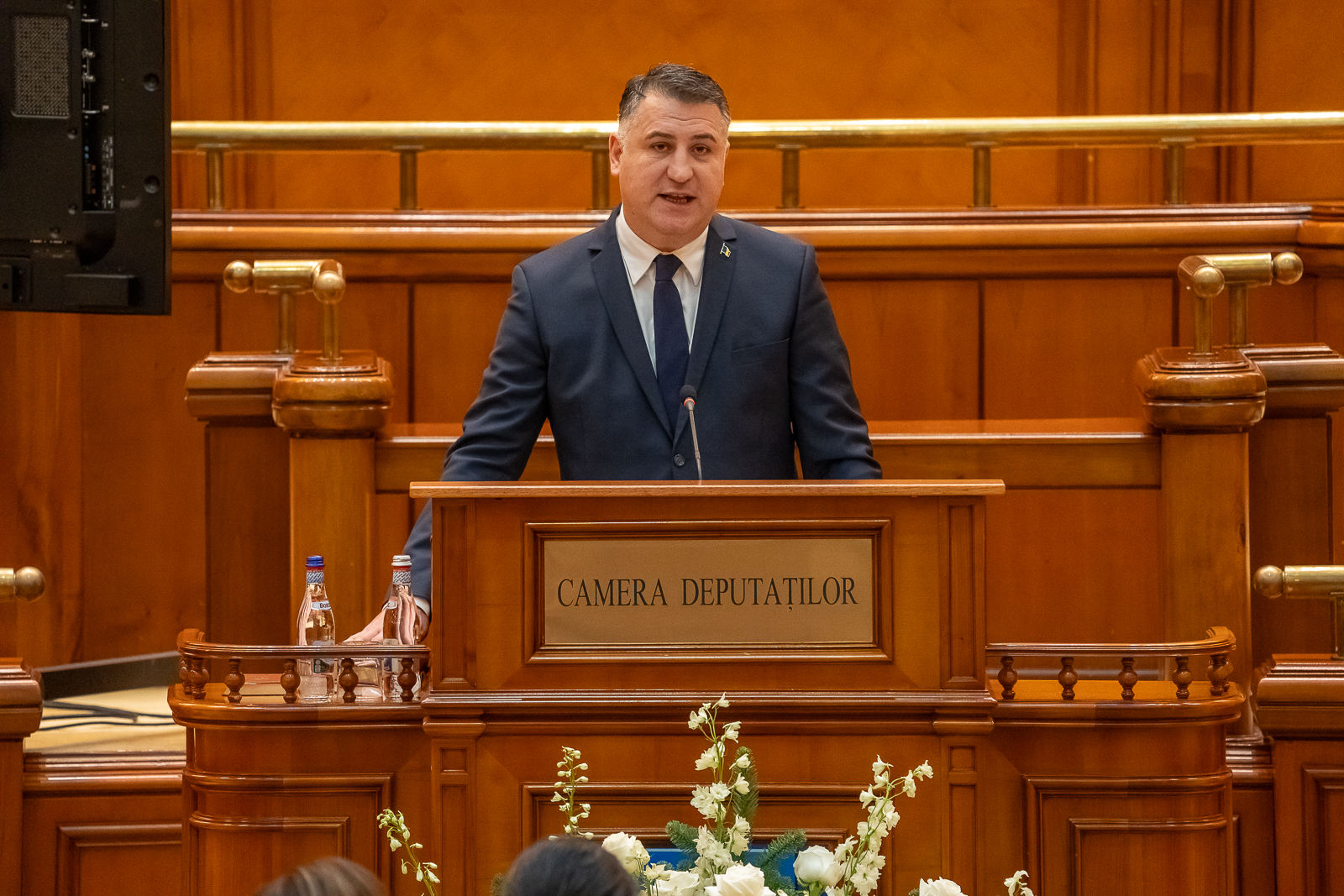
Paraschiv taking the oath of office, 21 December 2024

On 11 January 2024, Paraschiv announced that he had decided to suspend himself from his positions in international football bodies, the Union of European Football Associations (UEFA) and the worldwide FIFA, due to his political involvement.

In the 2024 Romanian parliamentary elections on 1 December, Paraschiv was elected a member of the Chamber of Deputies for the Alliance for the Union of Romanians for Iași County, taking office on 21 December. As a deputy, he is the chairman of the Committee on Youth and Sports, as well as a member of the parliamentary friendship groups for Senegal, Malta and Lithuania.

On 30 June 2025, Paraschiv along with his party chairman George Simion, accused FCSB owner and former party colleague Gigi Becali and Timiș County president Alfred Simonis of attempting to pass legislation for the sake of favouring themselves. In July of that year, Paraschiv as head of the Sports Committee led the negotiations on new anti-violence measures in stadiums, set to take effect in October.
