= Árpád Tordai =

Romanian footballer (born 1997)

Personal information
- Full name: Árpád Örs György Tordai
- Date of birth: 11 March 1997 (age 29)
- Place of birth: Târgu Mureș, Romania
- Height: 1.93 m (6 ft 4 in)
- Position: Goalkeeper

Team information
- Current team: CFR Cluj
- Number: 96

Youth career
- 2009–2015: Gheorghe Hagi Academy

Senior career*
Years	Team	Apps	(Gls)
2014–2021	Viitorul Constanța	25	(0)
2018	→ Petrolul Ploiești (loan)	18	(0)
2019	→ Universitatea Cluj (loan)	3	(0)
2021	→ Fehérvár (loan)	0	(0)
2021	Farul Constanța	3	(0)
2021–2024	Mezőkövesd	24	(0)
2024–2025	Žalgiris	44	(0)
2026	UTA Arad	5	(0)
2026–	CFR Cluj	0	(0)

International career
2013	Romania U16	1	(0)
2013–2014	Romania U17	6	(0)
2015–2016	Romania U19	5	(0)
2017–2018	Romania U21	5	(0)
- * Club domestic league appearances and goals as of 17 August 2026

Árpád Örs György Tordai (born 11 March 1997) is a Romanian professional footballer who plays as a goalkeeper for Liga I club CFR Cluj.

== Club career ==
On 16 February 2024, Tordai signed with Žalgiris in Lithuania.

== Personal life ==
He is of Hungarian ethnicity.

== Career statistics ==
=== Club ===
As of match played 17 August 2026

Appearances and goals by club, season and competition
Club	Season	League			National cup (Note: Includes Cupa României, Magyar Kupa, Lithuanian Cup)		Europe		Other		Total	
Club	Season	Division	Apps	Goals	Apps	Goals	Apps	Goals	Apps	Goals	Apps	Goals
Viitorul Constanța	2014–15	Liga I	0	0	0	0	—		0	0	0	0
Viitorul Constanța	2015–16	Liga I	4	0	0	0	—		0	0	4	0
Viitorul Constanța	2016–17	Liga I	0	0	0	0	0	0	1 (Note: Appearance in Cupa Ligii)	0	1	0
Viitorul Constanța	2017–18	Liga I	4	0	2	0	0	0	0	0	6	0
Viitorul Constanța	2018–19	Liga I	4	0	2	0	0	0	—		6	0
Viitorul Constanța	2019–20	Liga I	11	0	—		1 (Note: Appearances in UEFA Europa League)	0	1 (Note: Appearance in Supercupa României)	0	13	0
Viitorul Constanța	2020–21	Liga I	2	0	0	0	—		—		2	0
Viitorul Constanța	Total		25	0	4	0	1	0	2	0	32	0
Petrolul Ploiești (loan)	2018–19	Liga II	18	0	0	0	—		—		18	0
Universitatea Cluj (loan)	2019–20	Liga II	3	0	1	0	—		—		4	0
Fehérvár (loan)	2020–21	Nemzeti Bajnokság I	0	0	0	0	—		—		0	0
Farul Constanța	2021–22	Liga I	3	0	—		—		—		3	0
Mezőkövesd	2021–22	Nemzeti Bajnokság I	21	0	2	0	—		—		23	0
Mezőkövesd	2022–23	Nemzeti Bajnokság I	3	0	2	0	—		—		5	0
Mezőkövesd	2023–24	Nemzeti Bajnokság I	0	0	0	0	—		—		0	0
Mezőkövesd	Total		24	0	4	0	—		—		28	0
Žalgiris	2024	A Lyga	34	0	2	0	4 (Note: Appearances in UEFA Conference League)	0	—		25	5
Žalgiris	2025	A Lyga	10	0	0	0	0	0	1 (Note: Appearance in Lithuanian Supercup)	0	11	0
Žalgiris	Total		44	0	2	0	4	0	1	0	51	0
UTA Arad	2025–26	Liga I	3	0	1	0	—		—		4	0
UTA Arad	2026–27	Liga I	2	0	—		—		—		2	0
UTA Arad	Total		5	0	1	0	—		—		6	0
CFR Cluj	2026–27	Liga I	0	0	0	0	—		—		0	0
Career total			122	0	12	0	5	0	3	0	142	0

== Honours ==
Viitorul Constanța

- Liga I: 2016–17
- Cupa României: 2018–19
- Supercupa României: 2019

Fehérvár

- Magyar Kupa runner-up: 2020–21

Žalgiris

- A Lyga: 2024
- Lithuanian Supercup: 2025
