= 2020–21 FC Viitorul Constanța season =

Football season in Romania Liga I

Viitorul Constanța
2020–21 season
- President: Gheorghe Popescu
- Manager: Rubén de la Barrera (until 30 November); Mircea Rednic (until 5 April); Cătălin Anghel (from 6 April)
- Stadium: Stadionul Viitorul (Ovidiu)
- Liga I: 10th
- Cupa României: Round of 32
- Top goalscorer: League: Kevin Luckassen; Andrei Ciobanu (9 each); All: Kevin Luckassen; Andrei Ciobanu (9 each)
Home colours	Away colours	Third colours

The 2020–21 season was the 12th and final professional football season in Viitorul Constanța's existence, and the ninth in the top-flight of Romanian football. Viitorul competed in Liga I and in the Cupa României.

== Previous season positions ==
	Competition	Position
(European Union)	UEFA Europa League	Second qualifying round
(Romania)	Liga I	7th
(Romania)	Cupa României	Round of 32
(Romania)	Supercupa României	Winner

== Season overview ==
=== July ===
On 6 July 2020 Cosmin Dur-Bozoancă returned from loan at Universitatea Cluj. Cosmin was one of the main players at Universitatea Cluj and ASU Politehnica Timișoara, where he played 88 games. He was also called up at the Romania national under-21 football team for the 2021 UEFA European Under-21 Championship qualification Group 8 match against Denmark national under-21 football team.

George Ganea, Virgil Ghiță, Andrei Ciobanu and Carlo Casap were called up to the Romania national under-21 football team for a friendly match against FC Farul Constanța held at Mogoșoaia, on 6 August.

On 31 July 2020 the club announced that they signed the Spanish player Victor Fernández Satue.

=== August ===
On 6 August 2020 George Ganea scored two goals for Romania national under-21 football team in a friendly match against FC Farul Constanța. Virgil Ghiță, Andrei Ciobanu, and Carlo Casap were in the first XI.

On 7 August 2020 FC Viitorul Constanța appointed Rubén Alfonso de la Barrera Fernández as the new team manager and Francisco Ruiz Beltrán, Pere Romeu Sunyer, and Iván Peñaranda Llauradó as assistant managers. They were presented in a press conference alongside the club president, Gheorghe Popescu and sporting director, Zoltán Iasko.

On 10 August 2020 Rubén Alfonso de la Barrera Fernández led the first training session at FC Viitorul Constanța. On the same day, Alexandru Mățan and Valentin Cojocaru returned from the loan at FC Voluntari.

On 12 August 2020 FC Viitorul Constanța and KS Cracovia agreed to transfer Rivaldinho to the Polish club for a fee of €300,000.

On 17 August 2020 Louis Munteanu presented the team's new official logo and Nike home kit for the next season. That day, FC Viitorul Constanța announced that they signed the Spanish player Ángel Martínez who had played for Asteras Tripolis. FC Viitorul Constanța appointed Jarkko Tuomisto as the new Goalkeeping Coach for the team. As Goalkeeping Coach he led CSD Independiente del Valle to the title of the 2019 Copa Sudamericana.

On 18 August 2020 FC Viitorul Constanța announced that Vlad Achim's contract had expired and that he was being released. FC Dinamo București later announced that they signed Achim.

On 22 August 2020 the club announced that they signed the Dutch–Ghanaian player Kevin Luckassen.

On 23 August 2020 Viitorul drew 1–1 against UTA Arad at home. Gabriel Iancu scored a goal.

On 24 August 2020 the Gheorghe Hagi Football Academy and FC Viitorul Constanța signed a partnership with ACS Victoria Delta Tulcea.

On 25 August 2020 Louis Munteanu, Alexi Pitu, Darius Grosu and Constantin Grameni were called up to the Romania national under-19 football team for a friendly match against FC Voluntari held at Buftea, on 7 September.

On 27 August 2020 the Gheorghe Hagi Football Academy and FC Viitorul Constanța signed a partnership with CS Medgidia. That day the club also announced that they signed the player Alin Dobrosavlevici.

Gabriel Iancu was called up to the Romania national football team for the 2020–21 UEFA Nations League games against Northern Ireland and Austria on 4 and 7 September 2020 respectively.

George Ganea, Virgil Ghiță, Andrei Ciobanu, Alexandru Mățan, Radu Boboc and Carlo Casap were called up to the Romania national under-21 football team for the 2021 UEFA European Under-21 Championship qualification Group 8 match against to the Finland national under-21 football team in 4 September 2020 and to the Malta national under-21 football team in 8 September 2020.

On 30 August 2020 the match against FCSB was lost 3-0. On the same day, Viitorul reached an agreement with AFC Chindia Târgoviște to loan Tiberiu Căpușă, Marco Dulca and Paul Iacob for one season.

=== September ===
On 1 September 2020 the club announced that they signed the Spanish player Josemi Castañeda.

On 4 September 2020 Andrei Ciobanu scored one goal for the Romania national under-21 football team in the 2021 UEFA European Under-21 Championship qualification Group 8 match against the Finland national under-21 football team. Virgil Ghiță, George Ganea and Radu Boboc were in the first XI. Alexandru Mățan entered as a substitute.

On 5 September 2020 Louis Munteanu scored one goal for the Romania national under-19 football team in a friendly match against FC Voluntari. Darius Grosu was in the first XI. Constantin Grameni and Alexi Pitu entered as substitutes.

On 7 September 2020 Gabriel Iancu entered as substitute for Romania national football team in the UEFA Nations League match against the Austria national football team.

On 8 September 2020 in the 2021 UEFA European Under-21 Championship qualification Group 8 match against the Finland national under-21 football team, Virgil Ghiță and Carlo Casap were in the first XI. Alexandru Mățan and Andrei Ciobanu entered as substitutes.

On 14 September 2020 the match against CS Universitatea Craiova was lost 1-4. Kevin Luckassen scored his first goal for FC Viitorul Constanța.

On 19 September 2020 Viitorul drew 1–1 away against Sepsi OSK Sfântu Gheorghe. Andrei Ciobanu scored for Viitorul.

On 23 September 2020 the club announced that they signed the Spanish player Jon Gaztañaga. Gaztañaga was a product of Real Sociedad's youth system. Gaztañaga was picked by the Spain under-17 team for the 2008 UEFA European Football Championship. He started as a stopper in the final against France, which ended with a 4–0 triumph. On the same day FC Viitorul and Andrei Ciobanu, Radu Boboc, Alexandru Mățan, Carlo Casap and George Ganea reached an agreement to extend the players' contracts for another four seasons through to 2024 and Gabriel Iancu for a further two seasons through to 2022.

Romario Benzar joined FC Viitorul on 24 September on loan until the end of the 2020–21 season. Benzar started playing football in the Gheorghe Hagi Academy and made his debut for fellow team Viitorul Constanța in 2010. He won the Liga I in 2016–17. Benzar plays for the Romania national team. That day FC Viitorul and Ștefan Bodișteanu also reached an agreement to extend the player's contract for a further two seasons through to 2022 and Alexandru Georgescu for a further five seasons through to 2025. Viitorul had reached an agreement with FC Farul Constanța to loan Cosmin Dur-Bozoancă for one season.

On 25 September 2020 FC Viitorul and Damien Dussaut reached an agreement to extend the player's contract for a further two seasons through to 2022 and Cătălin Căbuz for a further three seasons through to 2023.

On 26 September 2020 Viitorul won 4–1 home against Astra Giurgiu. Gabriel Iancu made two goals, Kevin Luckassen and Alexandru Mățan scored for Viitorul. On the same day FC Viitorul Constanța and ACF Fiorentina reached an agreement to transfer Louis Munteanu to the Italian club for a fee of €2,000,000.

On 29 September 2020 the club announced that they signed the Romanian player Adrian Stoian. Stoian was picked by the Romania national football team in 2018.

On 8 September 2020 in the 2021 UEFA European Under-21 Championship qualification Group 8 match against to the Finland national under-21 football team, Virgil Ghiță and Carlo Casap were in the first XI. Alexandru Mățan and Andrei Ciobanu entered as substitutes.

=== October ===
On 4 October 2020 Viitorul drew 1–1 away against CFR Cluj. Kevin Luckassen scored for Viitorul. His goal was the 400th goal in Viitorul Constanța's existence in the top-flight of Romanian football.

On 5 October 2020 the club announced that they signed the Cape Verdean player Ely Fernandes.

On 6 October 2020 FC Viitorul and Bradley de Nooijer reached an agreement to extend the player's contract for a further three seasons.

On 8 October 2020 Gabriel Iancu entered as substitute for Romania national football team in the UEFA Euro 2020 Play-Off match against to the Iceland national football team.

On 9 October 2020 in the 2021 UEFA European Under-21 Championship qualification Group 8 match against to the Ukraine national under-21 football team, Virgil Ghiță, Alexandru Mățan and Andrei Ciobanu were in the first XI. Radu Boboc entered as a substitute.

On 11 October 2020 Gabriel Iancu was in the first XI for Romania national football team in the UEFA Nations League match against the Norway national football team.

On 13 October 2020 in the 2021 UEFA European Under-21 Championship qualification Group 8 match against the Malta national under-21 football team, George Ganea, Alexandru Mățan and Andrei Ciobanu were in the first XI. George Ganea and Alexandru Mățan scored for Romania national under-21 football team.

On 14 October 2020 Gabriel Iancu entered as a substitute for Romania national football team in the UEFA Nations League match against to the Austria national football team.

On 19 October 2020 Viitorul won 2–0 away against FC Voluntari. Kevin Luckassen and Carlo Casap scored for Viitorul.

On 25 October 2020 Viitorul drew 2–2 against FC Argeș Pitești at home. Andrei Ciobanu and Jon Gaztañaga scored for Viitorul.

=== November ===
On 1 November 2020 Viitorul won 3–0 away against Politehnica Iași. Alin Dobrosavlevici scored his first goal for Viitorul. The match was awarded to Viitorul because Politehnica's stadium wasn't able to provide the conditions.

On 8 November 2020 won 2–1 home against FC Dinamo București. Alin Dobrosavlevici and Kevin Luckassen scored for Viitorul.

On 17 November 2020 Romania national under-21 football team drew 1–1 against in the 2021 UEFA European Under-21 Championship qualification Group 8 match against to the Denmark national under-21 football team. Alexandru Mățan and Radu Boboc were in the first XI. Carlo Casap was also called.

On 21 November 2020 the match against Academica Clinceni was lost 1-0.

On 28 November 2020 the match against FC Dinamo București was lost 3-0.

On 30 November 2020 the technical staff (Rubén Alfonso de la Barrera Fernández, Francisco Ruiz Beltrán, Pere Romeu Sunyer, Iván Peñaranda Llauradó, Jarkko Tuomisto and Antonio Camacho) was sacked due to poor results.

=== December ===
On 1 December 2020 FC Viitorul Constanța appointed Mircea Rednic as the new manager for the team, Alecsandru Popovici and Sorin Rădoi as assistant managers, Ștefan Preda as goalkeeping coach and Andrei Antoce as fitness coach. Mircea Rednic managed teams such as FC Rapid București, FC Dinamo București, Khazar Lankaran FK, KAA Gent, Royal Excel Mouscron and Standard Liège. He last managed Politehnica Iași. Alecsandru Popovici was manager for ARO Câmpulung and assistant manager for FC Viitorul Constanța. Sorin Rădoi is a former player who played for FC Viitorul Constanța and was assistant manager for FC Viitorul Constanța. Ștefan Preda was goalkeeping coach for FCSB and FC Viitorul Constanța. As goalkeeper Preda got three caps for the national team, and was in the squad for the 1994 World Cup. Andrei Antoce was fitness coach for Politehnica II Iaşi.

On 12 December 2020 Viitorul drew 1–1 away against AFC Chindia Târgoviște. Gabriel Iancu scored for Viitorul.

On 15 December 2020 the match against FC Botoșani was lost 1-2. Kevin Luckassen scored a goal for FC Viitorul Constanța.

On 19 December 2020 the match against Gaz Metan Mediaș was lost 1-0.

=== January ===
On 6 January 2021 the club announced that they signed Latvian forward Valērijs Šabala. After loan stints in Poland, the Czech Republic, Slovakia and Latvia, on 4 August 2017 Šabala signed a two-year contract with I liga side Podbeskidzie Bielsko-Biała. He became the top scorer of the 2018–19 I liga season, scoring 12 goals. Šabala was a member of all international youth teams and made his debut for the Latvia national football team on 24 May 2013 in a friendly match against Qatar. In the next match he scored his first goals for the national team, scoring twice in a friendly match against Turkey, becoming the youngest ever international goal scorer for Latvia. His first official qualifier match was the 2014 World Cup qualifying match against Bosnia and Herzegovina.

On 10 January 2021 the club. won 2–1 home against FC Hermannstadt. Kevin Luckassen and Andrei Ciobanu scored for Viitorul.

On 11 January 2021 the club announced that they signed the Macedonian player David Babunski. Born in Skopje, Babunski joined FC Barcelona's La Masia in 2006, aged 12, after starring at UDA Gramenet.

On 13 January 2021 Gabriel Iancu, captain of FC Viitorul Constanța at the time, signed for the Russian club FC Akhmat Grozny for a reported fee of €500,000.

On 15 January 2021 Viitorul drew 0–0 away against UTA Arad.

On 19 January 2021 the club drew 2–2 against FCSB at home. Cosmin Matei and Ely Fernandes scored for Viitorul.

On 23 January 2021 Viitorul drew 1–1 away against FC Universitatea Craiova. Andrei Artean scored for Viitorul.

On 24 January 2021 the club announced that they signed Răzvan Grădinaru.

On 26 January 2021 the club drew 3–3 against Sepsi OSK Sfântu Gheorghe at home. Andrei Ciobanu and Kevin Luckassen scored for Viitorul.

On 31 January 2021 Viitorul drew 1–1 away against Astra Giurgiu. George Ganea scored for Viitorul.

=== February ===
On 1 February 2021 Kevin Luckassen, FC Viitorul Constanța's top goal scorer at the time, signed for the Turkish club Kayserispor for a reported fee of €800,000.

On 4 February, the match against CFR Cluj was lost 2-1. Alin Dobrosavlevici scored for Viitorul.

Artur Crăciun joined FC Viitorul on 6 February 2021 on loan until the end of the 2020–21 season.

On 8 February 2021 the club announced that they signed Jô Santos.

On 8 February 2021 the match against FC Voluntari was lost 0-1.

On 12 February 2021 Viitorul had reached an agreement with FC Vorskla Poltava to loan Bradley de Nooijer for one season. In the same day, the match against FC Argeș Pitești was lost 1-0.

On 17 February 2021 Luca Andronache and Ștefan Bodișteanu scored two goals for Romania national under-18 football team in a friendly match against FC Viitorul II Constanța. Luca Andronache scored one goal for Romania national under-18 football team in a friendly match against FCSB U18, too.

On 19 February 2021 the club announced that they signed Juvhel Tsoumou.

On 26 February 2021 FC Viitorul won 5–0 away against FC Dinamo București. Jô Santos, George Ganea, Andrei Ciobanu and Juvhel Tsoumou scored for Viitorul.

=== March ===
On 4 March 2021 the club announced that they signed Marquinhos Pedroso.

On 6 March 2021 Viitorul drew 1–1 against Academica Clinceni at home. Juvhel Tsoumou scored for Viitorul.

On 13 March 2021 Viitorul drew 0–0 against FC Hermannstadt.

On 15 March 2021 George Ganea, Radu Boboc and Andrei Ciobanu were called up for the 2021 UEFA European Under-21 Championship from 24 to 30 March 2021.

On 17 March 2021 Viitorul drew 0–0 against AFC Chindia Târgoviște at home.

On 19 March 2021 Juvhel Tsoumou was called by the Congo national football team for the 2021 Africa Cup of Nations qualifiers against Senegal and Guinea-Bissau on 22 and 30 March respectively.

On 24 March 2021 Andrei Ciobanu scored one goal for Romania national under-21 football team in the 2021 UEFA European Under-21 Championship match against Netherlands national under-21 football team. George Ganea and Radu Boboc were in the first XI.

On 26 March 2021 FC Viitorul won 1–0 against FC Argeș Pitești in a friendly match. Luca Andronache scored for Viitorul.

On 27 March 2021 Andrei Ciobanu, George Ganea and Radu Boboc played for Romania national under-21 football team in the 2021 UEFA European Under-21 Championship match against Hungary national under-21 football team.

On 30 March 2021 Andrei Ciobanu and Radu Boboc played for Romania national under-21 football team in the 2021 UEFA European Under-21 Championship match against Germany national under-21 football team.

=== April ===
On 4 April 2021 the club lost the match against FC Botoșani 1-0.

On 8 April 2021 the match against FC Politehnica Iași was lost 1-2.Juvhel Tsoumou scored for Viitorul. In the same day, Mircea Rednic and Andrei Antoce were sacked due to poor results.

On 6 April 2021 FC Viitorul Constanța appointed Cătălin Anghel as the new team manage. He had worked as head coach for CSO Ovidiu, Săgeata Năvodari and Viitorul Constanța.Cristian Sava was appointed as assistant manager and Ștefan Anghel as fitness coach.

On 12 April 2021 the match against Gaz Metan Mediaș was lost 0-2.

On 16 April the club lost the match against UTA Arad 1-0.

On 20 April the club won the match against Gaz Metan Mediaș 1-0. Andrei Ciobanu scored for Viitorul.

On 26 April the club lost the match against FC Voluntari 1-0.

On 29 April Viitorul won 3–0 away against Politehnica Iași. Jô Santos and Andrei Ciobanu scored for Viitorul.

=== May ===
On 2 May, Viitorul lost the match against FC Dinamo București. Jô Santos scored for Viitorul.

On 5 May 2021 Viitorul drew 0–0 against FC Hermannstadt.

On 9 May Viitorul won 1–0 home against FC Argeș Pitești. Andrei Artean scored for Viitorul.

On 14 May Viitorul won 2–0 away against AFC Chindia Târgoviște. Jô Santos and Aurelian Chițu scored for Viitorul.

On 19 May Viitorul won 1–0 home against AFC Astra Giurgiu. Aurelian Chițu scored for Viitorul.

On 27 May Viitorul won 3–2 away against AFC Chindia Târgoviște. Andrei Artean, Ely Fernandes and Juvhel Tsoumou scored for Viitorul.

On 30 May, Viitorul lost the match against Sepsi OSK Sfântu Gheorghe.

== Club officials ==
=== Management ===
Role	Name
Owner	(Romania) Gheorghe Hagi
President	(Romania) Gheorghe Popescu
General Director	(Romania) Cristian Bivolaru
Sporting director	(Romania) Zoltán Iasko
Organizer of Competitions	(Romania) Constantin Stamate
Judicial Department	(Romania) Florin Comșa
Economic Director	(Romania) Gheorghe Mega
Sports Center Administrator	(Romania) Decebal Curumi
Team Manager	(Romania) Costin Mega
Press Officer	(Romania) Ciprian Mihai

- Last updated: 2020
- Source: Board of directors (Hagi Academy)
- Source: Board of directors (Viitorul)

=== Current technical staff ===
Role	Name
Manager	(Romania) Cătălin Anghel
Assistant managers	(Romania) Cristian Sava (Romania) Sorin Rădoi
Goalkeeping coach	(Romania) Ștefan Preda
Fitness coaches	(Romania) Ștefan Anghel
Club Doctor	(Syria) Shadi Flaha
Nutritionist	(Romania) Cristian Mărgărit
Physiotherapist	(Romania) Paul Ciocănescu
Kinetotherapist	(Romania) Denis Răilean
Masseurs	(Romania) Daniel Stoian (Romania) Cosmin Ghiorghe
Storeman	(Romania) Ștefan Pețu (Romania) Alexandru Căscătău

- Last updated: 23 May 2021
- Source: Medical staff
- Source: Press release

== Players ==
=== Current squad ===
No.	Name	Nationality	Position	Date of Birth (Age)	Signed from	Signed in
Goalkeepers
12	Valentin Cojocaru	(Romania)	GK	1 October 1995 (age 30)	Apollon Limassol	2018
34	Cătălin Căbuz	(Romania)	GK	18 June 1996 (age 30)	Academy	2009
Defenders
3	Marquinhos Pedroso	(Brazil)	DF	4 October 1993 (age 32)	Botev Plovdiv	2021
4	Damien Dussaut	(France)	DF	8 November 1994 (age 31)	FC Dinamo București	2019
5	Sebastian Mladen	(Romania)	DF	11 December 1991 (age 34)	F.C. Südtirol	2017
6	Romario Benzar	(Romania)	DF	26 March 1992 (age 34)	Lecce	2020
15	Alexandru Georgescu	(Romania)	DF	10 July 2001 (age 25)	Academy	2010
21	Alin Dobrosavlevici	(Romania)	DF	24 October 1994 (age 31)	Hermannstadt	2020
23	Virgil Ghiță	(Romania)	DF	4 June 1998 (age 28)	Academy	2011
42	Gabriel Buta	(Romania)	DF	29 January 2002 (age 24)	Academy	2019
77	Radu Boboc	(Romania)	DF	24 July 1999 (age 27)	Academy	2013
Midfielders
8	Carlo Casap	(Romania)	MF	29 December 1998 (age 27)	Academy	2017
10	David Babunski	(North Macedonia)	MF	1 March 1994 (age 32)	FC Botoșani	2021
13	Cosmin Matei	(Romania)	MF	30 September 1991 (age 34)	Gençlerbirliği S.K.	2019
14	Roberto Mălăele	(Romania)	MF	29 March 2003 (age 23)	Academy	2016
17	Andrei Ciobanu	(Romania)	MF	18 January 1998 (age 28)	Academy	2010
18	Andrei Artean	(Romania)	MF	14 August 1993 (age 33)	ACS Poli Timișoara	2018
22	Florian Haită	(Romania)	MF	29 October 2000 (age 25)	Academy	2018
24	Constantin Grameni	(Romania)	MF	18 January 2002 (age 24)	Academy	2019
27	Ely Fernandes	(Cape Verde)	FW / MF	4 November 1990 (age 35)	Gaz Metan Mediaș	2020
28	Jon Gaztañaga	(Spain)	MF	28 June 1991 (age 35)	AEL Limassol	2020
30	Răzvan Grădinaru	(Romania)	MF	23 August 1995 (age 31)	FC Voluntari	2021
35	Nicolas Popescu	(Romania)	MF	2 January 2003 (age 23)	Academy	2018
66	Josemi Castañeda	(Spain)	MF	26 February 1998 (age 28)	Las Palmas Atlético	2020
98	Răzvan Matiș	(Romania)	MF	25 January 2001 (age 25)	Academy	2015
99	Ștefan Bodișteanu	(Romania) (Moldova)	MF	1 February 2003 (age 23)	Academy	2015
Forwards
7	George Ganea	(Romania)	FW	26 May 1999 (age 27)	CFR Cluj	2019
11	Jô Santos	(Brazil)	FW	31 March 1991 (age 35)	Hermannstadt	2021
19	Juvhel Tsoumou	(Republic of the Congo)	FW	27 December 1990 (age 35)	Liaoning Shenyang Urban	2021
25	Aurelian Chițu	(Romania)	FW	25 March 1991 (age 35)	Daejeon Hana Citizen FC	2020
49	Luca Andronache	(Romania)	FW	26 July 2003 (age 23)	Academy, previously from FCSB II	2019
80	Alexi Pitu	(Romania)	FW	5 June 2002 (age 24)	Academy	2010

=== Transfers ===
==== In ====
Date	Pos.	Player	Age	Moving from	Fee	Notes	Source
Summer
7 July 2020	GK	(Romania) Cosmin Dur-Bozoancă	22	(Romania) Universitatea Cluj	Free	Loan return	
31 July 2020	MF	(Spain) Victor Fernández Satue	22	(England) Newcastle U23	Free		
10 August 2020	GK	(Romania) Valentin Cojocaru	24	(Romania) FC Voluntari	Free	Loan return	
10 August 2020	MF	(Romania) Alexandru Mățan	20	(Romania) FC Voluntari	Free	Loan return	
17 August 2020	DF	(Spain) Ángel Martínez	29	(Greece) Asteras Tripolis	Free		
21 August 2020	FW	(Netherlands) Kevin Luckassen	27	(Romania) FC Politehnica Iași	Free		
27 August 2020	DF	(Romania) Alin Dobrosavlevici	25	(Romania) Hermannstadt	Free		
1 September 2020	MF	(Spain) Josemi Castañeda	22	(Spain) Las Palmas Atlético	Free		
23 September 2020	MF	(Spain) Jon Gaztañaga	29	(Cyprus) AEL Limassol	Free		
29 September 2020	MF	(Romania) Adrian Stoian	29	(Italy) Livorno	Free		
5 October 2020	FW	(Cape Verde) Ely Fernandes	29	(Romania) Gaz Metan Mediaș	Free		
Winter
28 December 2020	MF	(Romania) Florian Haită	20	(Romania) Turris Turnu Măgurele	Free	Loan return	
28 December 2020	MF	(Romania) Răzvan Matiș	19	(Romania) Petrolul Ploiești	Free	Loan return	
6 January 2021	FW	(Latvia) Valērijs Šabala	26	(Lithuania) FK Sūduva	Free		
11 January 2021	MF	(North Macedonia) David Babunski	26	(Romania) FC Botoșani	Free		
23 January 2021	MF	(Romania) Răzvan Grădinaru	25	(Romania) FC Voluntari	Free		
8 February 2021	FW	(Brazil) Jô Santos	29	(Romania) Hermannstadt	Free		
19 February 2021	FW	(Republic of the Congo) Juvhel Tsoumou	30	(China) Liaoning Urban	Free		
5 March 2021	DF	(Brazil) Marquinhos Pedroso	27	(Bulgaria) Botev Plovdiv	Free		

==== Out ====
Date	Pos.	Player	Age	Moving to	Fee	Notes	Source
Summer
2 April 2020	FW	(Cameroon) Jacques Zoua	28	(Cameroon) AS Futuro de Mimboman	Free		
10 June 2020	MF	(Romania) Alexandru Iulian Stoica	22	(Romania) FC Farul Constanța	Free	previously on loan	
24 June 2020	GK	(Romania) Alexandru Buzbuchi	26	(Romania) Gaz Metan Mediaș	Free		
28 June 2020	DF	(Romania) Cristian Ganea	28	(Spain) Athletic Bilbao	Free	Loan return, later signed by (Greece) Aris	
9 July 2020	MF	(France) Malcom Edjouma	23	(Belgium) K.S.V. Roeselare	Free		
24 July 2020	FW	(Romania) Dimciu Halep	20	(Romania) FCSB II	Free	previously on loan at Farul Constanța	
4 August 2020	MF	(Romania) Cosmin Bîrnoi	22	(Romania) FC Farul Constanța	Free		
12 August 2020	FW	(Brazil) Rivaldinho	25	(Poland) KS Cracovia	€300,000		
18 August 2020	DF	(Romania) Szabolcs Kilyén	22	(Hungary) Vasas SC Budapest	Free	previously on loan at Dinamo București	
18 August 2020	MF	(Romania) Vlad Achim	31	(Romania) FC Dinamo București	Free		
8 September 2020	MF	(Romania) Andrei Tîrcoveanu	23	(Romania) FC Botoșani	Free	previously on loan at Concordia Chiajna	
26 September 2020	FW	(Romania) Louis Munteanu	18	(Italy) Fiorentina Primavera	€2,000,000		
Winter
19 December 2020	MF	(Romania) Adrian Stoian	29	(Italy) Ascoli	Free		
28 December 2020	DF	(Spain) Ángel Martínez	29	(Greece) PAS Lamia 1964	Free		
6 January 2021	MF	(Spain) Victor Fernández Satue	22	(Romania) FC Botoșani	Free		
13 January 2021	FW	(Romania) Gabriel Iancu	26	(Russia) Akhmat Grozny	€500,000		
1 February 2021	FW	(Netherlands) Kevin Luckassen	27	(Turkey) Kayserispor	€800,000		
8 March 2021	MF	(Romania) Alexandru Mățan	21	(United States) Columbus Crew SC	€1,500,000		
9 March 2021	DF	(Moldova) Artur Crăciun	22	(Hungary) Budapest Honvéd	Free	loan return, later signed by (Moldova) Sfântul Gheorghe	
29 March 2021	FW	(Latvia) Valērijs Šabala	26	(Poland) GKS Bełchatów	Free		

==== Loans in ====
Date	Pos.	Player	Age	Moving from	Fee	Notes	Source
22 September 2020	RB	(Romania) Romario Benzar	28	(Italy) Lecce	Free	until the end of the 2020–21 season	
6 February 2021	DF	(Moldova) Artur Crăciun	23	(Hungary) Budapest Honvéd	Free	until the end of the 2020–21 season	

==== Loans out ====
No.	Pos.	Nation	Player
—	FW	ROU	Vlad Chera (on loan to (Romania) CSM Reșița, previously on loan to Ripensia Timișoara)
—	MF	ROU	Alexandru Negrean (on loan to (Romania) Universitatea Cluj, previously on loan to Viitorul Târgu Jiu)
—	DF	ROU	Alexandru Sima (on loan to (Romania) Turris Turnu Măgurele)
—	GK	MDA	Sebastian Agachi (on loan to (Romania) FC Farul Constanța, previously on loan at Argeș Pitești)
—	DF	ROU	Darius Mureșan (on loan to (Romania) CS Aerostar Bacău)
—	GK	ROU	Ștefan Mușat (on loan to (Romania) CSA Steaua București)
—	DF	ROU	Robert Ghiță (on loan to (Romania) AFC Unirea Slobozia, previously on loan to CS Mioveni)
—	MF	ROU	Radu Pocol (on loan to (Romania) AFC Unirea Slobozia)
—	DF	ROU	Tiberiu Căpușă (on loan to (Romania) AFC Chindia Târgoviște)
—	DF	ROU	Paul Iacob (on loan to (Romania) AFC Chindia Târgoviște)
—	MF	ROU	Marco Dulca (on loan to (Romania) AFC Chindia Târgoviște)
—	FW	ROU	Remus Mihai (on loan to (Romania) Gloria Albești)
—	DF	ROU	Ștefan Marin (on loan to (Romania) Axiopolis Cernavodă)
—	DF	ROU	Vlad Ștefănescu (on loan to (Romania) Axiopolis Cernavodă)
—	MF	ROU	Răzvan Matiș (on loan to (Romania) Petrolul Ploiești, previously on loan at Argeș Pitești)
—	GK	ROU	Cosmin Dur-Bozoancă (on loan to (Romania) FC Farul Constanța)
—	GK	ROU	Árpád Tordai (on loan to (Hungary) MOL Fehérvár)
—	DF	ROU	Alexandru Sima (on loan to (Romania) CSM Reșița, previously on loan at Turris Turnu Măgurele)
—	DF	NED	Bradley de Nooijer (on loan to (Ukraine) FC Vorskla Poltava)

==== Retired players ====
No.	Pos.	Nation	Player
—	MF	ROU	Doru Dumitrescu

== Friendly matches ==
Win Draw Loss

26 March 2021 Friendly	FC Argeș Pitești (Romania)	0-1	(Romania) Viitorul Constanța	Buftea, Romania
EEST (UTC+3)			Luca Andronache 13'	Stadium: Buftea National Football Center; Referee: Sergiu Anton (Bucharest), Petruța Iugulescu (Târgoviște) and Cătălina Nan (Alexandria - Teleorman)

== Competitions ==
Win Draw Loss

=== Liga I ===
==== Regular season ====
===== Table =====
Pos	Team	Pld	W	D	L	GF	GA	GD	Pts	Qualification
11	Gaz Metan Mediaș	30	9	6	15	33	41	−8	33	Qualification for the Play-out round
12	Voluntari	30	8	8	14	32	40	−8	32	Qualification for the Play-out round
13	Viitorul Constanța	30	6	13	11	36	37	−1	31	Qualification for the Play-out round
14	Dinamo București	30	7	6	17	26	41	−15	27	Qualification for the Play-out round
15	Hermannstadt	30	5	11	14	28	40	−12	26	Qualification for the Play-out round

Source: LPF (in Romanian), Soccerway
Rules for classification: 1) Points; 2) Head-to-head points; 3) Head-to-head goal difference; 4) Head-to-head goals scored; 5) Goal difference; 6) Goals scored; 7) Play-off.

===== Results by round =====
Round	1	2	3	4	5	6	7	8	9	10	11	12	13	14	15	16	17	18	19	20	21	22	23	24	25	26	27	28	29	30
Ground	H	A	H	A	H	H	A	H	A	H	A	H	A	H	A	A	H	A	H	A	A	H	A	H	A	H	A	H	A	H
Result	D	L	L	D	W	D	W	D	W	W	L	W	D	L	L	D	D	D	D	D	L	L	L	L	W	D	D	D	L	L
Position	11	14	16	14	14	13	8	9	6	6	7	6	6	7	8	7	7	8	8	8	9	10	12	11	12	11	11	11	11	13

Updated to match(es) played on 16 March 2021. Source: Liga I
A = Away; H = Home; W = Win; D = Draw; L = Loss

==== Matches ====
23 August 2020 1	Viitorul Constanța	1–1	UTA Arad	Ovidiu
15:30 EEST (UTC+3)	Iancu 43' (pen.); Mladen (yellow card) 90+5'		Buhăcianu 45'; Hora (yellow card) 60'	Stadium: Viitorul; Attendance: 0 Referee: Marcel Bîrsan (Bucharest), Bogdan Gheorghe (Bucharst), Ferencz Tunyogi (Zalău)

30 August 2020 2	FCSB	3–0	Viitorul Constanța	Bucharest
21:00 EEST (UTC+3)	Tănase 2'; Mladen 50' (o.g.); Vînă 90+1'		Chițu (yellow card) 26'	Stadium: Arena Națională; Attendance: 0 Referee: Ovidiu Hațegan (Arad), Octavian Șovre (Satu Mare), Sebastian Gheorghe (Suceava)

14 September 2020 3	Viitorul Constanța	1–4	CS Universitatea Craiova	Ovidiu
21:00 EEST (UTC+3)	Kevin Luckassen 45+2'; Ciobanu (yellow card) 36'; Dussaut (yellow card) 49'; Matei (yellow card) 60'; Mățan (yellow card) 83'; Artean (red card) 4'		Koljić 18' 51'; Bancu 66'; Ivan 75'; Bic (yellow card) 30'	Stadium: Viitorul; Attendance: 0 Referee: Andrei Chivulete (Bucharest), Marius Nicoară (Drobeta Tr. Severin - Mehedinți), Andrei Constantinescu (Bucharest)

19 September 2020 4	Sepsi OSK Sfântu Gheorghe	1–1	Viitorul Constanța	Sfântu Gheorghe
19:00 EEST (UTC+3)	Šafranko 82'; Fofana (yellow card) 2'; Nouvier (yellow card) 23'; Aganović (yellow card) 47'; Ștefan (yellow card) 70'		Ciobanu 38'; Matei (yellow card) 80'; Mățan (yellow card) 90+3'	Stadium: Stadionul Municipal (Sfântu Gheorghe); Attendance: 0 Referee: Sebastian Colțescu (Craiova), Octavian Șovre (Satu Mare), Sebastian Gheorghe (Suceava).

26 September 2020 5	Viitorul Constanța	4–1	Astra Giurgiu	Ovidiu
21:30 EEST (UTC+3)	Gabriel Iancu 13' 59' (yellow card) 64'; Kevin Luckassen 20'; Mățan 38'; Jon Gaztañaga (yellow card) 75'		Alibec 63' (pen.)	Stadium: Viitorul; Attendance: 0 Referee: Istvan Kovacs (Satu Mare), Vasile Marinescu (Bucharest), Ovidiu Artene (Vaslui)

4 October 2020 6	Viitorul Constanța	1–1	CFR Cluj	Ovidiu
21:30 EEST (UTC+3)	Kevin Luckassen 7'; Jon Gaztañaga (yellow card) 75'; Virgil Ghiță (yellow card) 52'; Gabriel Iancu (yellow card) 87'		Deac 54' (pen.); Mario Rondon (yellow card) 20'; Billel Omrani (yellow card) 22'; Mike Cestor (yellow card) 63'; Ciprian Deac (yellow card) 67'; Mário Camora (yellow card) 89'; Alexandru Păun (yellow card) 90+1'	Stadium: Viitorul; Attendance: 0 Referee: Marcel Bîrsan (Bucharest), Mircea Orbuleț (Bucharest), Valentin Avram (Bucharest)

19 October 2020 7	FC Voluntari	0-2	Viitorul Constanța	Voluntari
18:00 EEST (UTC+3)	Ion Gheorghe (yellow card) 57'; Pablo de Lucas (yellow card) 37'		Kevin Luckassen 66'; Casap 90+3'; Andrei Ciobanu (yellow card) 29'; Romario Benzar (yellow card) 52'; Gabriel Iancu (yellow card) 56'; Valentin Cojocaru (yellow card) 90+3'	Stadium: Stadionul Anghel Iordănescu; Attendance: 0 Referee: Marian Barbu (Făgăraș - Brașov), George Neacșu (Câmpulung Muscel - Argeș), Andrei Constantinescu (Bucharest)

25 October 2020 8	Viitorul Constanța	2–2	FC Argeș Pitești	Ovidiu
18:45 EEST (UTC+3)	Jon Gaztañaga 61'; Ciobanu 90' (pen.); Sebastian Mladen (yellow card) 68'		Cephas Malele 30' (pen.) 57'; Gabriel Matei (yellow card) 67' (yellow-red card) 90'; Grigore Turda (yellow card) 76'; Ionuț Șerban (yellow card) 90'; Daniel Șerbănică (yellow card) 90+3'	Stadium: Viitorul; Attendance: 0 Referee: Andrei Moroiță (Ploiești), Radu Ghinguleac (Bucharest), Mircea Grigoriu (Bucharest)

1 November 2020 9	FC Politehnica Iași	0-3 (Awarded)	Viitorul Constanța	Iași
18:00 EEST (UTC+3)	Dženan Zajmović 51'		Alin Dobrosavlevici 20'; Kevin Luckassen (yellow card) 38'	Stadium: Stadionul Emil Alexandrescu; Attendance: 0 Referee: Horia Mladinovici (Bucharest), Alexandru Cerei (Cluj) and Marius Marchidanu (Brăila)

8 November 2020 10	Viitorul Constanța	2–1	FC Dinamo București	Ovidiu
21:00 EEST (UTC+3)	Alin Dobrosavlevici 53'; Kevin Luckassen 56'; Bradley de Nooijer (yellow card) 49'; George Ganea (yellow card) 88'; Árpád Tordai (yellow card) 90+1'; Alin Dobrosavlevici (yellow card) 90+5'		Borja Valle 64'; Deian Sorescu (yellow card) 63'; Borja Valle (yellow card) 67'; Paul Anton (yellow card) 80'; Alexander Gonzalez (yellow card) 85'	Stadium: Viitorul; Attendance: 0 Referee: Istvan Kovacs (Satu Mare), Vasile Marinescu (Bucharest) and Ovidiu Artene (Vaslui)

21 November 2020 11	FC Academica Clinceni	1-0	Viitorul Constanța	Clinceni
13:00 EEST (UTC+3)	Georgi Pashov 30'; Tsvetelin Chunchukov (yellow card) 2' (yellow-red card) 55'; Georgi Pashov (yellow card) 41'; Octavian Vâlceanu (yellow card) 76'; Florin Gardoș (yellow card) 90+3'		Alin Dobrosavlevici (yellow card) 35'; Andrei Ciobanu (yellow card) 40'	Stadium: Stadionul Clinceni; Attendance: 0 Referee: Radu Petrescu (Bucharest), Mircea Grigoriu (Bucharest) and Vladimir Urzică (Piatra Neamț)

12 December 2020 13	AFC Chindia Târgoviște	1-1	Viitorul Constanța	Giurgiu
19:30 EEST (UTC+3)	Daniel Florea 63'		Gabriel Iancu 14'; Damien Dussaut (yellow card) 19'; Alin Dobrosavlevici (yellow card) 89'; Jon Gaztañaga (yellow card) 90+2'; Valentin Cojocaru (red card) 36'	Stadium: Stadionul Marin Anastasovici; Attendance: 0 Referee: Horia Mladinovici (Bucharest), Vladimir Urzică (Piatra Neamț) and Alexandru Vodă (Alba Iulia)

15 December 2020 14	Viitorul Constanța	1–2	FC Botoșani	Ovidiu
21:00 EEST (UTC+3)	Kevin Luckassen 90'; Andrei Ciobanu (yellow card) 8'		Hamidou Keyta 37' 68'; Denis Haruț (yellow card) 32'; Jonathan Rodríguez (yellow card) 56'; Hervin Ongenda (yellow card) 57' (yellow-red card) 59'; Hidajet Hankič (yellow card) 85'	Stadium: Viitorul; Attendance: 0 Referee: Adrian Cojocaru (Galați), Valentin Avram (Bucharest) and Andrei Constantinescu (Bucharest)

19 December 2020 15	Gaz Metan Mediaș	1-0	Viitorul Constanța	Mediaș
20:30 EEST (UTC+3)	Ondřej Bačo 48'; Mihai Butean (yellow card) 13'; Nasser Chamed (yellow card) 21'; Ovidiu Horșia (yellow card) 44'; Yves Pambou (yellow card) 77'; Răzvan Pleșca (yellow card) 88'		Andrei Artean (yellow card) 69'; Cosmin Matei (yellow card) 77'	Stadium: Stadionul Gaz Metan; Attendance: 0 Referee: Andrei Florin (Tg. Mureș), Florin Neacșu (Câmpulung Muscel - Argeș) and Marius Badea (Rm. Vâlcea - Vâlcea)

10 January 2021 12	Viitorul Constanța	2–1	FC Hermannstadt	Ovidiu
19:00 EEST (UTC+3)	Kevin Luckassen 37'; Andrei Ciobanu 84'; Romario Benzar (yellow card) 79'; Damien Dussaut (yellow card) 81'		Raul Opruț 19'; Jô Santos (yellow card) 14'	Stadium: Viitorul; Attendance: 0 Referee: Radu Petrescu (Bucharest), Radu Ghinguleac (Bucharest) and Mircea Grigoriu (Bucharest)

15 January 2021 16	UTA Arad	0-0	Viitorul Constanța	Arad
17:00 EEST (UTC+3)	Roger (yellow card) 53'		Virgil Ghiță (yellow card) 39' (yellow-red card) 83'	Stadium: Stadionul Francisc von Neuman; Attendance: 0 Referee: Lucian Rusandu (Sf. Gheorghe - Covasna), Imre Bucsi (Sf. Gheorghe - Covasna) and Stelian Slabu (Brașov)

20 January 2020 17	Viitorul Constanța	2–2	FCSB	Ovidiu
20:00 EEST (UTC+3)	Cosmin Matei 18' (pen.); Ely Fernandes 73'; Andrei Artean (yellow card) 34'; Radu Boboc (yellow card) 55'; Sebastian Mladen (yellow card) 59'; Valentin Cojocaru (yellow card) 90+2'		Florin Tănase 56' (pen.); Damien Dussaut 71' (o.g.); Alexandru Buziuc (yellow card) 77'	Stadium: Viitorul; Attendance: 0 Referee: Istvan Kovacs (Satu Mare), Vasile Marinescu (Bucucharest) și Valentin Avram (Buchatrest)

23 January 2021 18	CS Universitatea Craiova	1-1	Viitorul Constanța	Craiova
21:00 EEST (UTC+3)	Paul Papp 45'; Alexandru Mateiu (yellow card) 8'; Dan Nistor (yellow card) 77'		Andrei Artean 47'; Radu Boboc (yellow card) 71'; Jon Gaztañaga (yellow card) 77'	Stadium: Stadionul Ion Oblemenco; Attendance: 0 Referee: Marcel Bîrsan (Bucharest), Radu Ghinguleac (Bucharest) and Vladimir Urzică (Piatra Neamț)

26 January 2020 19	Viitorul Constanța	3–3	Sepsi OSK Sfântu Gheorghe	Ovidiu
15:30 EEST (UTC+3)	Kevin Luckassen 8' 45' (yellow card) 31'; Andrei Ciobanu 48' (pen.); Sebastian Mladen (yellow card) 78'		Eder González 18'; Bogdan Mitrea 48' (pen.); Pavol Šafranko 90+1'; Balázs Csiszér (yellow card) 70'; Răzvan Tincu (yellow card) 75'; Aleksa Markovic (yellow card) 86'	Stadium: Viitorul; Attendance: 0 Referee: Horațiu Feșnic (Cluj-Napoca), Alexandru Cerei (Cluj-Napoca) and Marius Marica (Bistrița-Năsăud)

31 January 2021 20	Astra Giurgiu	1-1	Viitorul Constanța	Giurgiu
14:00 EEST (UTC+3)	Sébastien Wüthrich 61'; Dario Čanađija (yellow card) 28'; Constantin Budescu (yellow card) 45+1'; Yann Boé-Kane (yellow card) 78'; Daniel Graovac (yellow card) 82'		George Ganea 10'; Damien Dussaut (yellow card) 22'; David Babunski (yellow card) 50'; Andrei Artean (yellow card) 64'	Stadium: Stadionul Marin Anastasovici; Attendance: 0 Referee: Ovidiu Hațegan (Arad), Radu Ghinguleac (Bucharest) and Mihăiță Necula (Bucharest)

4 February 2021 21	CFR Cluj	2-1	Viitorul Constanța	Cluj
20:00 EEST (UTC+3)	Cătălin Itu 31' (yellow card) 34'; Ovidiu Hoban (yellow card) 90+2'; Camora (yellow card) 74'		Alin Dobrosavlevici 52'; Romario Benzar (yellow card) 56'; Jon Gaztañaga (yellow card) 74'; Andrei Artean (yellow card) 90+3'	Stadium: Stadionul Dr. Constantin Rădulescu; Attendance: 0 Referee: Istvan Kovacs (Satu Mare), Vasile Marinescu (Bucharest) and Ovidiu Artene (Vaslui)

8 February 2020 22	Viitorul Constanța	0–1	FC Voluntari	Ovidiu
17:30 EEST (UTC+3)	George Ganea (yellow card) 49'		Jefté Betancor 5'; Martin Remacle (yellow card) 35'; Alexandru Ilie (yellow card) 42'; Mourad Satli (yellow card) 49'; Lukáš Droppa (yellow card) 81'; Ivan Pešić (yellow card) 83'; Alexandru Ionuț Stoica (yellow card) 90'	Stadium: Viitorul; Attendance: 0 Referee: Radu Petrescu (Bucharest), Marius Marica (Bistrița - Bistrița Năsăud) and Florin Neacșu (Câmpulung Muscel - Argeș)

12 February 2021 23	FC Argeș Pitești	1-0	Viitorul Constanța	Pitești
20:00 EEST (UTC+3)	Grigore Turda 71'; Cephas Malele (yellow card) 54'			Stadium: Stadionul Nicolae Dobrin; Attendance: 0 Referee: Sebastian Colțescu (Craiova), Vasile Marinescu (București) and Adrian Popescu (Craiova)

26 February 2021 25	FC Dinamo București	0-5	Viitorul Constanța	Bucharest
20:30 EEST (UTC+3)	Alexandru Răuță (yellow card) 51'		Jô Santos 14'; George Ganea 16' (pen.); Andrei Ciobanu 44' 80'; Juvhel Tsoumou 79'	Stadium: Stadionul Dinamo; Attendance: 0 Referee: Adrian Cojocaru (Galați), Bogdan Gheorghe (Bucharest) and Marius Badea (Rm. Vâlcea)

26 February 2021 26	Viitorul Constanța	1-1	FC Academica Clinceni	Ovidiu
20:30 EEST (UTC+3)	Juvhel Tsoumou 90'		Răzvan Andronic 41'	Stadium: Viitorul; Attendance: 0 Referee: Marian Barbu (Făgăraș - Brașov), Ovidiu Artene (Vaslui) and Mihai Marica (Bistrița - Bistrița Năsăud)

13 March 2021 27	FC Hermannstadt	0-0	Viitorul Constanța	Mediaș
14:30 EEST (UTC+3)	Bright Addae (yellow card) 16'; Dražen Bagarić (yellow card) 20'; Claudiu Belu (yellow card) 25'		Sebastian Mladen (yellow card) 77'	Stadium: Stadionul Gaz Metan; Attendance: 0 Referee: George Găman (Craiova), Daniel Mitruți (Craiova) and Adrian Popescu (Craiova)

17 March 2021 28	Viitorul Constanța	1-1	AFC Chindia Târgoviște	Ovidiu
17:30 EEST (UTC+3)	Alin Dobrosavlevici (yellow card) 25'; Cosmin Matei (yellow card) 59'; Marquinhos Pedroso (yellow card) 88'; Andrei Artean (yellow card) 90+1'		Daniel Celea (yellow card) 61'; Daniel Popa (yellow card) 73'; Denis Dumitrașcu (yellow card) 85'	Stadium: Viitorul; Attendance: 0 Referee: Marcel Bîrsan (Bucharest), Vladimir Urzică (Piatra Neamț) ans Mihai Marica (Bistrița)

4 April 2021 29	FC Botoșani	1-0	Viitorul Constanța	Botoșani
15:00 EEST (UTC+3)	Hamidou Keyta 82'; Ulrich Meleke (yellow card) 51'; Hamidou Keyta (yellow card) 69'		Damien Dussaut (yellow card) 41'; Sebastian Mladen (yellow card) 48'; Andrei Artean (yellow card) 63'; George Ganea (yellow card) 70'	Stadium: Stadionul Municipal (Botoșani); Attendance: 0 Referee: Sebastian Colțescu (Craiova), Daniel Mitruți (Craiova) and Marius Badea (Rm. Vâlcea)

8 April 2021 24	Viitorul Constanța	1-2	FC Politehnica Iași	Ovidiu
19:00 EEST (UTC+3)	Juvhel Tsoumou 82'; Andrei Artean (yellow card) 35'; Damien Dussaut (yellow card) 90'		Uroš Đuranović 51'; Andreias Calcan 86' (yellow card) 57'; Doru Popadiuc (yellow card) 81'; Laurențiu Brănescu (yellow card) 90+1'	Stadium: Viitorul; Attendance: 0 Referee: Marian Barbu (Făgăraș - Brașov), Laszlo Imre Bucsi (Sf. Gheorghe - Covasna) and Marius Marchidanu (Brăila)

12 April 2021 30	Viitorul Constanța	0-2	Gaz Metan Mediaș	Ovidiu
20:30 EEST (UTC+3)	Romario Benzar (yellow card) 12'; Jon Gaztañaga (yellow card) 89'		Ionuț Larie 28'; Ricardo Valente 39'; Mihai Velisar (yellow card) 14'; Bryan Alceus (yellow card) 18'; Răzvan Horj (yellow card) 41'	Stadium: Viitorul; Attendance: 0 Referee: Florin Andrei (Tg. Mureș), Mircea Orbuleț (Bucharest) and Alexandru Vodă (Alba Iulia)

==== Relegation round ====
===== Table =====
Pos	Team	Pld	W	D	L	GF	GA	GD	Pts	Qualification or relegation
7	Chindia Târgoviște	9	4	4	1	7	3	+4	36	Qualification to European competition play-offs
8	UTA Arad (Note: UTA Arad failed to obtain a UEFA licence.)	9	4	1	4	7	9	−2	32 (Note: Points in the regular season: UTA 37, Gaz 33, Viitorul 31)	
9	Gaz Metan Mediaș (Note: Gaz Metan Mediaș failed to obtain a UEFA licence.)	9	4	3	2	15	10	+5	32	
10	Viitorul Constanța (E, M)	9	5	1	3	9	4	+5	32	Merged with Farul Constanța after qualification to European competition play-offs
11	Argeș Pitești	9	3	2	4	10	7	+3	31 (Note: Points w/o rounding: Argeș 31.0, Dinamo 30.5)	
12	Dinamo București	9	5	2	2	11	8	+3	31	
13	Voluntari (O)	9	3	3	3	6	7	−1	28	Qualification for the relegation play-offs
14	Hermannstadt (R)	9	4	1	4	6	9	−3	26	Qualification for the relegation play-offs
15	Astra Giurgiu (R)	9	1	2	6	6	12	−6	24	Relegation to 2021–22 Liga II
16	Politehnica Iași (R)	9	2	1	6	7	15	−8	20	Relegation to 2021–22 Liga II

Source: Soccerway, FRF (in Romanian), LPF (in Romanian)
Rules for classification: 1) Points; 2) Points without rounding; 3) Points in the regular season; 4) Goal difference; 5) Goals scored; 6) Play-off (only if needed to decide teams for relegation). (Note: only criteria 4 and 5 are applied to establish the classification during the competition.)
(E) Eliminated; (M) Merged with another team; (O) Play-off winners; (R) Relegated

===== Results by round =====
Round	1	2	3	4	5	6	7	8	9
Ground	A	H	A	A	H	A	H	A	H
Result	L	W	L	W	L	D	W	W	W
Position	13	11	13	13	13	13	12	12	10

Updated to match(es) played on 2021. Source: Liga I
A = Away; H = Home; W = Win; D = Draw; L = Loss

===== Matches =====
Win Draw Loss

16 April 2021 1	UTA Arad	1-0	Viitorul Constanța	Arad
17:00 EEST (UTC+3)	Ioan Hora 63'; Modestas Vorobjovas (yellow card) 71'; Florin Ilie (yellow card) 87'; David Miculescu (yellow card) 90'		Răzvan Grădinaru (yellow card) 62'; Florian Haită (yellow card) 72'	Stadium: Stadionul Francisc von Neuman; Attendance: 0 Referee: Iulian Călin (Ștefănești - Argeș), Daniel Mitruți (Craiova - Dolj) and Adrian Popescu (Craiova - Dolj)

20 April 2021 2	Viitorul Constanța	1-0	Gaz Metan Mediaș	Ovidiu
19:00 EEST (UTC+3)	Andrei Ciobanu 82' (pen.); Sebastian Mladen (yellow card) 52'; Florian Haită (yellow card) 60'; George Ganea (yellow card) 66'; Romario Benzar (yellow card) 80'; David Babunski (yellow card) 90+1'		Vlad Morar (yellow card) 26'; Ondřej Bačo 80'; Gabriel de Moura (yellow card) 80'; Zé Manuel (yellow card) 90'; Yuri Matias (yellow card) 90+2'	Stadium: Viitorul; Attendance: 0 Referee: George Găman (Craiova - Dolj), Vladimir Urzică (Piatra Neamț) and Ferencz Tunyogi (Zalău - Sălaj)

26 April 2021 3	FC Voluntari	1-0	Viitorul Constanța	Voluntari
20:30 EEST (UTC+3)	Jefté Betancor 66' (yellow card) 57'; Igor Armaș (yellow card) 12'		Sebastian Mladen (yellow card) 90+3'	Stadium: Stadionul Anghel Iordănescu; Attendance: 0 Referee: Istvan Kovacs (Carei - Satu Mare), Mircea Grigoriu (Bucharest) and Ovidiu Artene (Vaslui)

29 April 2021 4	FC Politehnica Iași	0-3	Viitorul Constanța	Iași
14:30 EEST (UTC+3)	Laurențiu Brănescu 21'; Manuel de Iriondo 25'		Andrei Ciobanu 7' (pen.) 22' (pen.); Jô Santos 90+1'; Alin Dobrosavlevici (yellow card) 42'; George Ganea (yellow card) 59'; Răzvan Grădinaru (yellow card) 68'; Cosmin Matei (yellow card) 72'; David Babunski (yellow card) 76'; Marquinhos Pedroso (yellow card) 84'	Stadium: Stadionul Emil Alexandrescu; Attendance: 0 Referee: Ionuț Coza (Cernica - Ilfov), Ciprian Danșa (Satu Mare) and Imre Bucsi (Sf. Gheorghe - Covasna)

2 May 2021 5	Viitorul Constanța	1–2	FC Dinamo București	Ovidiu
19:00 EEST (UTC+3)	Jô Santos 88'; Marquinhos Pedroso (yellow card) 40'; Valentin Cojocaru (yellow card) 50'		Jonathan Morsay 62' (yellow card) 90+4'; Raúl Albentosa 74'; Deian Sorescu (yellow card) 55'	Stadium: Viitorul; Attendance: 0 Referee: Sebastian Colțescu (Craiova - Dolj), Adrian Popescu (Craiova - Dolj) and Andrei Constantinescu (Bucharest)

5 May 2021 6	FC Hermannstadt	0-0	Viitorul Constanța	Mediaș
14:30 EEST (UTC+3)	Bright Addae (yellow card) 34'; Raul Opruț (yellow card) 38'; Andrei Sîntean (yellow card) 50'; Adrian Scarlatache (yellow card) 58'; Romário Pires (yellow card) 59'		Radu Boboc (yellow card) 77'; Romario Benzar (red card) 90+2'	Stadium: Stadionul Gaz Metan; Attendance: 0 Referee: Andrei Chivulete (Bucharest), Octavian Șovre (Satu Mare) and Bogdan Gheorghe (Bucharest)

9 May 2021 7	Viitorul Constanța	1–0	FC Argeș Pitești	Ovidiu
16:30 EEST (UTC+3)	Andrei Artean 48'; Jô Santos (yellow card) 27'; George Ganea (yellow card) 37'; Marquinhos Pedroso (yellow card) 80'		Sylvain Deslandes (yellow card) 45'; Deian Boldor (yellow card) 65'; Georgian Honciu (yellow card) 82'	Stadium: Viitorul; Attendance: 0 Referee: Horațiu Feșnic (Cluj Napoca), Valentin Avram (Bucharest) and Alexandru Cerei (Cluj Napoca)

14 May 2021 8	AFC Chindia Târgoviște	0-2	Viitorul Constanța	Buzău
20:30 EEST (UTC+3)			Aurelian Chițu 55'; Jô Santos 84'	Stadium: Stadionul Municipal (Buzău); Attendance: 0 Referee: Radu Petrescu (Bucharest), Octavian Șovre (Satu Mare) and Mircea Grigoriu (Bucharest)

19 May 2021 9	Viitorul Constanța	1–0	Astra Giurgiu	Ovidiu
18:30 EEST (UTC+3)	Aurelian Chițu 90+4'; Juvhel Tsoumou (yellow card) 38'; Andrei Artean (yellow card) 50'; Radu Boboc (yellow card) 77'; Valentin Cojocaru (yellow card) 90+1'		Albert Stahl (yellow card) 60'; Yann Boé-Kane (yellow card) 85'	Stadium: Viitorul; Attendance: 0 Referee: Ovidiu Hațegan (Arad), Adrian Ghinguleac (Bucuharest) and Sebastian Gheorghe (Suceava)

=== European play-offs ===
In the semi-final, the 7th and 8th-placed teams of the Liga I plays a one-legged match on the ground of the better placed team (7th place). In the final, the winner of the semi-final will encounter the team ranked on the last UEFA Europa Conference League spot in the play-off tournament. The winner of the final will enter the second qualifying round of the UEFA Europa Conference League.

==== European play-off semi-final ====
27 May 2021	Chindia Târgoviște	2-3	Viitorul Constanța	Buzău
20:30 EEST (UTC+3)	Daniel Popa 6'; Vadim Rață 64' (yellow card) 35'; Cornel Dinu (yellow card) 35'; Marius Martac (yellow card) 52'		Andrei Artean 38'; Ely Fernandes 49'; Juvhel Tsoumou 86'; Florian Haită (yellow card) 71'; Valentin Cojocaru (yellow card) 89'	Stadium: Municipal; Attendance: 0 Referee: Istvan Kovacs (Carei - Satu Mare), Vasile Marinescu (Bucharest) and Mihai Marica (Bistrița)

==== European play-off final ====
30 May 2021	Sepsi Sfântu Gheorghe	1-0	Viitorul Constanța	Sfântu Gheorghe
20:30 EEST (UTC+3)	Adnan Aganović 42'; Anass Achahbar (yellow card) 62'; Gabriel Vașvari (yellow card) 90+1'; Roland Niczuly (yellow card) 90+3'		Andrei Artean (yellow card) 78'	Stadium: Municipal; Referee: Radu Petrescu (Bucharest), Radu Ghinguleac (Bucharest) and Mircea Grigoriu (Bucharest)

=== Cupa României ===
28 November 2020 Round of 32	FC Dinamo București	3–0	Viitorul Constanța	Bucharest
20:45 EET (UTC+2)	Fabbrini 11', 89'; Sorescu 14'			Stadium: Dinamo; Attendance: None (Behind closed doors); Referee: Marius Avram (Bucharest)

== Statistics ==
=== Appearances and goals ===
No.	Pos	Player	Liga I		Cupa României		European play-offs		Total	
No.	Pos	Player	Apps	Goals	Apps	Goals	Apps	Goals	Apps	Goals
5	MF	(Romania) Sebastian Mladen	35	0	0	0	2	0	37	0
18	MF	(Romania) Andrei Artean	29	2	1	0	2	1	32	3
7	FW	(Romania) George Ganea	30	2	1	0	0	0	31	2
23	DF	(Romania) Virgil Ghiță	14	0	0	0	0	0	14	0
77	DF	(Romania) Radu Boboc	32	0	1	0	0	0	33	0
17	MF	(Romania) Andrei Ciobanu	35	9	1	0	0	0	36	9
13	MF	(Romania) Cosmin Matei	33	1	1	0	0	0	34	1
99	FW	(Romania) Ștefan Bodișteanu	4	0	0	0	0	0	4	0
12	GK	(Romania) Valentin Cojocaru	31	0	0	0	1	0	32	0
8	MF	(Romania) Carlo Casap	9	1	0	0	1	0	10	1
25	FW	(Romania) Aurelian Chițu	8	2	0	0	2	0	10	2
4	DF	(France) Damien Dussaut	24	0	0	0	2	0	26	0
66	MF	(Spain) Josemi Castañeda	3	0	0	0	0	0	3	0
15	DF	(Romania) Alexandru Georgescu	1	0	0	0	1	0	2	0
28	MF	(Spain) Jon Gaztañaga	18	1	1	0	0	0	19	1
19	DF	(Romania) Romario Benzar	23	0	0	0	0	0	23	0
27	MF	(Cape Verde) Ely Fernandes	18	1	0	0	2	1	20	2
80	MF	(Romania) Alexi Pitu	17	0	0	0	0	0	17	0
77	DF	(Romania) Alin Dobrosavlevici	28	3	1	0	2	0	31	3
34	GK	(Romania) Cătălin Căbuz	8	0	1	0	0	0	9	0
49	FW	(Romania) Luca Andronache	11	0	0	0	0	0	11	0
22	MF	(Romania) Florian Haită	6	0	0	0	2	0	8	0
10	MF	(North Macedonia) David Babunski	13	0	0	0	0	0	13	0
30	MF	(Romania) Răzvan Grădinaru	18	0	0	0	1	0	19	0
11	FW	(Brazil) Jô Santos	15	4	0	0	2	0	17	4
19	FW	(Republic of the Congo) Juvhel Tsoumou	16	3	0	0	2	1	18	4
3	DF	(Brazil) Marquinhos Pedroso	9	0	0	0	2	0	11	0
24	MF	(Romania) Constantin Grameni	11	0	0	0	2	0	13	0
98	FW	(Romania) Răzvan Matiș	1	0	0	0	2	0	3	0
42	DF	(Romania) Gabriel Buta	2	0	0	0	1	0	3	0
Players transferred out during the season
9	FW	(Romania) Louis Munteanu	2	0	0	0	0	0	2	0
39	MF	(Romania) Adrian Stoian	4	0	1	0	0	0	5	0
16	DF	(Spain) Ángel Martínez	4	0	1	0	0	0	5	0
11	MF	(Spain) Victor Fernández Satue	5	0	0	0	0	0	5	0
1	GK	(Romania) Árpád Tordai	2	0	0	0	0	0	2	0
10	FW	(Romania) Gabriel Iancu	9	4	1	0	0	0	10	4
42	FW	(Netherlands) Kevin Luckassen	18	9	1	0	0	0	19	9
6	DF	(Netherlands) Bradley de Nooijer	12	0	1	0	0	0	13	0
20	MF	(Romania) Alexandru Mățan	21	1	1	0	0	0	22	1
9	FW	(Latvia) Valērijs Šabala	5	0	0	0	0	0	5	0

=== Squad statistics ===
	Liga I	Cupa României	European play-offs
Games played	39	1	2
Games won	11	0	1
Games drawn	14	0	0
Games lost	14	1	1
Goals scored	45	0	3
Goals conceded	41	3	3
Goal difference	+4	-3	0
Clean sheets	11	0	0
Goal by Substitute	5	0	1
Total shots	319	–	15
Shots on target	153	–	9
Corners	178	–	11
Players used	38	14	17
Offsides	77	–	5
Fouls suffered	558	–	26
Fouls committed	550	–	27
Yellow cards	86	2	3
Red cards	4	0	0

=== Goalscorers ===
R	No.	Pos.	Nation	Name	Liga I	Cupa României	European play-offs	Total
1	42	FW	(Netherlands)	Kevin Luckassen	9	0	0	9
1	17	MF	(Romania)	Andrei Ciobanu	9	0	0	9
2	10	FW	(Romania)	Gabriel Iancu	4	0	0	4
2	11	FW	(Brazil)	Jô Santos	4	0	0	4
2	19	FW	(Republic of the Congo)	Juvhel Tsoumou	3	0	1	4
3	77	DF	(Romania)	Alin Dobrosavlevici	3	0	0	3
3	18	MF	(Romania)	Andrei Artean	2	0	1	3
4	7	FW	(Romania)	George Ganea	2	0	0	2
4	27	MF	(Cape Verde)	Ely Fernandes	2	0	0	2
4	25	FW	(Romania)	Aurelian Chițu	2	0	0	2
5	20	MF	(Romania)	Alexandru Mățan	1	0	0	1
5	8	MF	(Romania)	Carlo Casap	1	0	0	1
5	28	MF	(Spain)	Jon Gaztañaga	1	0	0	1
5	13	MF	(Romania)	Cosmin Matei	1	0	0	1

=== Goal minutes ===
	1'–15'	16'–30'	31'–HT	46'–60'	61'–75'	76'–FT	Extra time	Forfeit
Goals	7	5	8	8	6	12	0	0
Percentage	15.21%	10.86%	17.39%	17.39%	13.04%	26.04%	0%	0%

=== Clean sheets ===
Rank	Name	Liga I	Cupa României	European play-offs	Total	Games played
1	(Romania) Valentin Cojocaru	11	0	0	11	33
2	(Romania) Cătălin Căbuz	1	0	0	1	10
3	(Romania) Árpád Tordai	0	0	0	0	2
Total		11	0	0	11	42

=== Disciplinary record ===
As of 2021

Number	Position	Nation	Name	Liga I			Cupa României			European play-offs			Total		
Number	Position	Nation	Name	Booked	(yellow card) (yellow-red card)	Sent off (straight red)	Booked	(yellow card) (yellow-red card)	Sent off (straight red)	Booked	(yellow card) (yellow-red card)	Sent off (straight red)	Booked	(yellow card) (yellow-red card)	Sent off (straight red)
5	DF	(Romania)	Sebastian Mladen	7	0	0	0	0	0	0	0	0	7	0	0
25	FW	(Romania)	Aurelian Chițu	1	0	0	0	0	0	0	0	0	1	0	0
17	MF	(Romania)	Andrei Ciobanu	5	0	0	0	0	0	0	0	0	5	0	0
4	DF		Damien Dussaut	5	0	0	0	0	0	0	0	0	5	0	0
20	MF	(Romania)	Alexandru Mățan	2	0	0	0	0	0	0	0	0	2	0	0
13	MF	(Romania)	Cosmin Matei	4	0	0	0	0	0	0	0	0	4	0	0
18	MF	(Romania)	Andrei Artean	7	0	1	0	0	0	1	0	0	8	0	1
10	FW	(Romania)	Gabriel Iancu	3	0	0	0	0	0	0	0	0	3	0	0
28	MF	(Spain)	Jon Gaztañaga	6	0	0	1	0	0	0	0	0	7	0	0
23	DF	(Romania)	Virgil Ghiță	1	1	0	0	0	0	0	0	0	1	1	0
12	GK	(Romania)	Valentin Cojocaru	4	0	1	0	0	0	1	0	0	5	0	1
19	DF	(Romania)	Romario Benzar	4	1	0	0	0	0	0	0	0	4	1	0
42	DF	(Netherlands)	Kevin Luckassen	2	0	0	0	0	0	0	0	0	2	0	0
7	FW	(Romania)	George Ganea	6	0	0	0	0	0	0	0	0	6	0	0
77	DF	(Romania)	Alin Dobrosavlevici	4	0	0	0	0	0	0	0	0	5	0	0
6	DF	(Netherlands)	Bradley de Nooijer	1	0	0	0	0	0	0	0	0	1	0	0
1	GK	(Romania)	Árpád Tordai	1	0	0	0	0	0	0	0	0	1	0	0
16	DF	(Spain)	Ángel Martínez	0	0	0	1	0	0	0	0	0	1	0	0
77	DF	(Romania)	Radu Boboc	4	0	0	0	0	0	0	0	0	4	0	0
10	MF	(North Macedonia)	David Babunski	3	0	0	0	0	0	0	0	0	3	0	0
3	DF	(Brazil)	Marquinhos Pedroso	4	0	0	0	0	0	0	0	0	4	0	0
30	MF	(Romania)	Răzvan Grădinaru	2	0	0	0	0	0	0	0	0	2	0	0
22	MF	(Romania)	Florian Haită	2	0	0	0	0	0	1	0	0	3	0	0
11	FW	(Brazil)	Jô Santos	1	0	0	0	0	0	0	0	0	1	0	0
9	FW	(Republic of the Congo)	Juvhel Tsoumou	1	0	0	0	0	0	0	0	0	1	0	0

=== Managerial statistics (2020-21 season) ===
Manager	From	To	Record						
Manager	From	To	G	W	D	L	GF	GA	GD
(Spain) Rubén de la Barrera	7 August 2020	30 November 2020	12	4	4	4	15	18	33.33
(Romania) Mircea Rednic	1 December 2020	5 April 2021	18	2	9	7	19	20	11.11
(Romania) Cătălin Anghel	6 April 2021	Present	12	6	1	5	11	8	50.00

=== Injury record ===
N	P	Nat.	Name	Type	Status	Source	Match	Inj. Date	Ret. Date
25	FW	(Romania)	Aurelian Chițu	rupture of the anterior cruciate ligament in the left knee			in training	19 September 2020	10 February 2021
8	MF	(Romania)	Carlo Casap	rupture of the anterior cruciate ligament in the left knee			in training	28 November 2020	8 April 2021

- Player is injured
- Player has recovered from injury
Last updated: February 2021
Source: https://www.fcviitorul.ro/

== See also ==
- 2020–21 Cupa României
- 2020–21 Liga I
