= Călmățui (Teleorman) =

- Location within Romania

Location
- Country: Romania
- Counties: Olt, Teleorman

Physical characteristics
- Mouth: Danube
  - coordinates: 43.7009°N 25.1904°E
- Length: 139 km (86 mi)
- Basin size: 1,413 km^{2} (546 sq mi)

Basin features
- Progression: Danube→ Black Sea
- Tributaries
  - left: Călmățuiul Sec, Urlui
  - right: Sodol, Ducna

The Călmățui is a left tributary of the river Danube in Romania. It discharges into the Danube near Suhaia. It flows through the villages Stoicănești, Radomirești, Călinești, Crângeni, Călmățuiu, Salcia, Putineiu, Dracea, Crângu, Lisa and Viișoara. Its length is 139 km (86 mi) and its basin size is 1,413 km^{2} (546 sq mi).
