= Sprâncenata =

- Commune
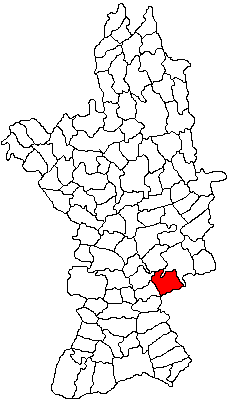
- Location in Olt County

- Location in Romania
- Coordinates: 44°5′N 24°38′E
- Country: Romania
- County: Olt
- Area: 64.45 km^{2} (24.88 sq mi)
- Population (2021-12-01): 2,008
  - Density: 31/km^{2} (81/sq mi)
- Time zone: EET/EEST (UTC+2/+3)
- Vehicle reg.: OT

Sprâncenata is a commune in Olt County, Muntenia, Romania.

== Position ==
Sprâncenata is situated in the Wallachian Plain, on the left bank of the Olt River. It is composed of four villages: Sprâncenata and Bârseștii de Sus, which are located along the county road DJ 546 (Slatina – Turnu Măgurele), between km 47 and 54, and Frunzaru and Uria, which are located in the Olt meadow, directly on the bank of the river.

The commune is located in the south-east of the county, at 51 km (32 mi) south of Slatina (the county seat) and 43 km (27 mi) north of Turnu Măgurele. The neighbouring communes are: to the east, Radomirești; to the south, Crângeni and Plopii-Slăvitești (both in Teleorman County); to the west, Scărișoara, Băbiciu, and Gostavățu; to the north, Dăneasa and Radomirești.

== Topography ==
The Sprâncenata commune, bordered on the east by the Călmățui River and west by the Olt River, is situated approximately 50 km (31 mi) from the 200 m (660 ft) contour line, which marks the geographic limit between the Getic Plateau to the north and the Wallachian Plain to the south. The eastern side of this grassland is crossed by two valleys almost parallel with the Călmățui, named Vâlceaua Mare and Vâlceaua Mică.

== Climate ==
Sprâncenata has a temperate continental climate of transition and in respect to the existing topography, it is a flatland climate, with small influences due to local factors. The average yearly temperature is 10.9 °C (51.6 °F).

== Rivers ==
The main river in this zone is the Olt, which lies west of the commune. The average discharge of the Olt River in this area is 167 m^{3}/s (5,900 cu ft/s), as measured at the Frunzaru village, where there is a hydroelectric power plant.

Another river is the Călmățui to the east of the commune. It is a typical grassland river, with a winding valley and an intermittent flow.

The third river in the area is the Sâi, which is a small river whose source is near Comani; it flows directly into the Danube.

== Soil ==
In this zone, there are several types of soil, such as: dark or red brown chernozem, washed or levigated chernozem (characteristic to steppe and silvo-steppe zones), regosols, and alluvial soils.

== Wildlife ==
The flora and fauna of the commune is typical of the local steppe, forest and meadow zones.

The forest occupies a relatively small surface and is composed of oak, ash, hornbeam, and maple trees. On the banks of the Olt River there are meadow forests and water meadows.

The variety of the topography and of the vegetation gives rise to a dense population of animals and birds, such as wild boars, deer, foxes, rabbits, hamsters, mice, ground squirrels, polecats, badgers, as well as nightingales, skylarks, sparrows, goldfinches, turtledoves, woodpeckers, magpies, pheasants, etc.
