= Stejaru =

Stejaru may refer to several places in Romania:

- Stejaru, Tulcea, a commune in Tulcea County
- Stejaru, Teleorman, a commune in Teleorman County
- Stejaru, a village in Scorțeni, Bacău Commune, Bacău County
- Stejaru, a village in Saraiu Commune, Constanţa County
- Stejaru, a village in Singureni, Giurgiu Commune, Giurgiu County
- Stejaru, a village in Roșia de Amaradia Commune, Gorj County
- Stejaru, a village in Perieți, Ialomița Commune, Ialomiţa County
- Stejaru, a village in Corcova Commune, Mehedinţi County
- Stejaru, a village in Farcașa Commune, Neamţ County
- Stejaru, a village in Ion Creangă, Neamț Commune, Neamţ County
- Stejaru, a village in Pângărați Commune, Neamţ County
- Stejaru, a village in Milcov, Olt Commune, Olt County
- Stejaru, a village in Brazi Commune, Prahova County
- Stejaru, a village in Crângeni Commune, Teleorman County
- Stejaru, a village in Pungești Commune, Vaslui County

== See also ==
- Bicaz-Stejaru Hydroelectric Power Station, Romania
- Stejar, a village in Vărădia de Mureș Commune, Arad County
- Stejarul, the Romanian name for Karapelit village, Dobrich Province, Bulgaria
- Stejar (disambiguation)
- Stejeriș (disambiguation)
