= Raúl Torres (footballer, born 1984) =

Spanish association football player

Personal information
- Full name: Raúl Torres Abad
- Date of birth: 24 April 1984 (age 42)
- Place of birth: Terrassa, Spain
- Height: 1.74 m (5 ft 9 in)
- Positions: Midfielder; forward

Senior career*
Years	Team	Apps	(Gls)
2004	Barbastro		
2004–2005	Burgos	15	(1)
2005–2006	Terrassa	1	(0)
2006	Figueres	17	(3)
2006–2009	Terrassa	68	(3)
2009	Kitchee	5	(0)
2010	Lanzarote	14	(1)
2011	Ronda		(2)
2012–2014	Cultural y Deportiva Leonesa	64	(9)
2014–2015	Badalona	37	(5)
2015–2016	L'Hospitalet	29	(2)
2016–2018	Terrassa		(20)
2018–2019	Granollers	19	(3)
2019–2020	Vilassar de Mar	8	(0)
- * Club domestic league appearances and goals

Raúl Torres Abad (born 24 April 1984) is a Spanish former footballer.
