= Călmățuiul Sec =

- Location within Romania

Location
- Country: Romania
- Counties: Olt, Teleorman
- Villages: Mihăești, Călmățuiu de Sus

Physical characteristics
- Mouth: Călmățui
  - coordinates: 44.0132°N 24.8089°E
- Length: 48 km (30 mi)
- Basin size: 167 km^{2} (64 sq mi)

Basin features
- Progression: Călmățui→ Danube→ Black Sea
- River code: XIV.1.31.2

The Călmățuiul Sec is a left tributary of the river Călmățui in Romania. It flows into the Călmățui in Balta Sărată. Its length is 48 km (30 mi) and its basin size is 167 km^{2} (64 sq mi).
