= Stejeriș =

Stejeriş may refer to several villages in Romania:

- Stejeriş, a village in Moldovenești Commune, Cluj County
- Stejeriş, a village in Acățari Commune, Mureș County

== See also ==
- Stejar (disambiguation)
- Stejaru (disambiguation)
