= Florian Haită =

Romanian footballer

Personal information
- Full name: Florian Nichita Haită
- Date of birth: 29 October 2000 (age 26)
- Place of birth: Bucharest, Romania
- Height: 1.69 m (5 ft 7 in)
- Position: Winger

Team information
- Current team: Bihor Oradea (on loan from Voluntari)
- Number: 80

Youth career
- –2018: Academia Sport Team București
- 2018–2019: Gheorghe Hagi Academy

Senior career*
Years	Team	Apps	(Gls)
2019–2021	Viitorul Constanța	8	(0)
2019–2020	→ Turris Turnu Măgurele (loan)	38	(4)
2021–2025	Farul Constanța	0	(0)
2021–2023	→ Universitatea Cluj (loan)	43	(6)
2023–2024	→ Argeș Pitești (loan)	13	(1)
2024–2025	→ CSM Reșița (loan)	28	(7)
2025–	Voluntari	28	(3)
2026–	→ Bihor Oradea (loan)	5	(1)
- * Club domestic league appearances and goals as of 22 October 2026

Florian Nichita Haită (born 29 October 2000) is a Romanian professional footballer who plays as a winger for Liga II club Bihor Oradea, on loan from Liga I club Voluntari.

== Club career ==
=== Viitorul Constanta ===
He made his league debut on 15 January 2021 in Liga I match against UTA Arad.

== Career statistics ==
As of match played 27 October 2026

Appearances and goals by club, season and competition
Club	Season	League			Cupa României		Europe		Other		Total	
Club	Season	Division	Apps	Goals	Apps	Goals	Apps	Goals	Apps	Goals	Apps	Goals
Turris Turnu Măgurele (loan)	2019–20	Liga II	27	4	0	0	—		—		27	4
Turris Turnu Măgurele (loan)	2020–21	Liga II	11	0	2	0	—		—		13	0
Turris Turnu Măgurele (loan)	Total		38	4	2	0	—		—		40	4
Viitorul Constanța	2020–21	Liga I	8	0	—		—		—		8	0
Universitatea Cluj (loan)	2021–22	Liga II	27	6	0	0	—		1 (Note: Appearances in Liga I promotion/relegation play-offs)	0	28	6
Universitatea Cluj (loan)	2022–23	Liga I	16	0	3	1	—		—		19	1
Universitatea Cluj (loan)	Total		43	6	3	1	—		1	0	47	7
Argeș Pitești (loan)	2023–24	Liga II	13	1	2	0	—		—		15	1
CSM Reșița (loan)	2024–25	Liga II	28	7	4	1	—		—		32	8
Voluntari	2025–26	Liga II	23	3	2	2	—		2	0	27	5
Voluntari	2026–27	Liga I	5	0	1	0	—		—		6	0
Voluntari	Total		28	3	3	2	—		2	0	33	5
Bihor Oradea (loan)	2026–27	Liga II	5	1	1	0	—		—		6	1
Career total			163	22	15	4	0	0	3	0	181	26

== Honours ==
Universitatea Cluj

- Cupa României runner-up: 2022–23
