= Fântânele, Teleorman =

Fântânele
- Commune
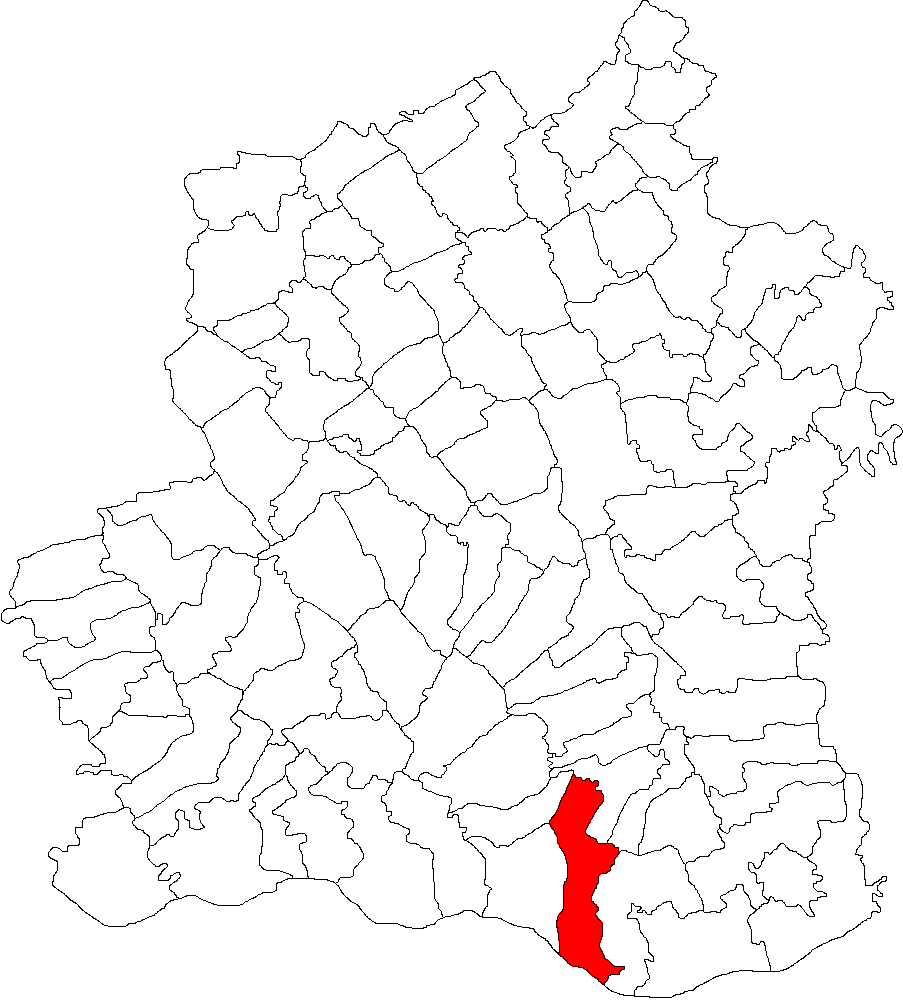
- Location in Teleorman County

- Location in Romania
- Coordinates: 43°43′N 25°17′E
- Country: Romania
- County: Teleorman
- Population (2021-12-01): 1,305
- Time zone: EET/EEST (UTC+2/+3)
- Vehicle reg.: TR

Fântânele (Romanian pronunciation: [fɨntɨˈnele]) is a commune in Teleorman County, Muntenia, Romania. It is composed of a single village, Fântânele, part of Suhaia Commune until 2004, when it was split off.
