= Andrei Ciobanu =

Romanian professional footballer

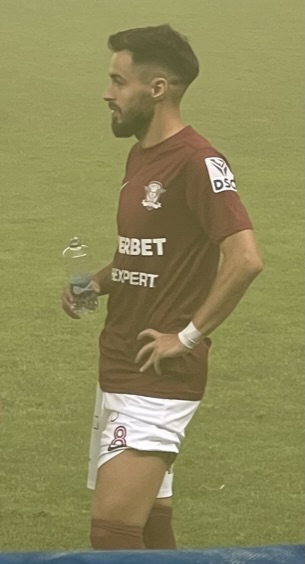
- Ciobanu with Rapid București in 2022

Personal information
- Full name: Virgil Andrei Ciobanu
- Date of birth: 18 January 1998 (age 28)
- Place of birth: Bârlad, Romania
- Height: 1.76 m (5 ft 9 in)
- Position: Midfielder

Team information
- Current team: Oțelul Galați
- Number: 17

Youth career
- 2005–2007: FEPA Bârlad
- 2007–2010: Sporting Vaslui
- 2010–2015: Gheorghe Hagi Academy

Senior career*
Years	Team	Apps	(Gls)
2016–2021	Viitorul Constanța	110	(16)
2021–2022	Farul Constanța	31	(2)
2022–2024	Rapid București	13	(0)
2023–2024	→ Politehnica Iaşi (loan)	11	(0)
2024	Voluntari	9	(0)
2024–2025	Farul Constanța	23	(0)
2025–	Oțelul Galați	47	(4)

International career
2014–2015	Romania U17	6	(0)
2016	Romania U19	3	(0)
2017–2021	Romania U21	22	(4)
2021	Romania Olympic	7	(0)
- * Club domestic league appearances and goals as of 1 November 2026

Virgil Andrei Ciobanu (born 18 January 1998) is a Romanian professional footballer who plays as a midfielder for Liga I club Oțelul Galați.

== Club career ==
He played with Viitorul U19 in the Youth League in 8 games and scored 4 goals. Ciobanu made his debut in Liga I at the age of 17 and scored against the Romanian champions at that time, Astra Giurgiu; he has collected 101 matches since his debut and scored 12 goals, having also 16 assists.

On 16 June 2022, he transferred to fellow Liga I team Rapid București.

In June 2025, the player moved to Oțelul Galați from Liga I, signing a two-year contract.

== Career statistics ==
As of match played 1 November 2026

Appearances and goals by club, season and competition
Club	Season	League			Cupa României		Europe		Other		Total	
Club	Season	Division	Apps	Goals	Apps	Goals	Apps	Goals	Apps	Goals	Apps	Goals
Viitorul Constanța	2015–16	Liga I	2	1	0	0	—		—		2	1
Viitorul Constanța	2016–17	Liga I	2	0	0	0	0	0	—		2	0
Viitorul Constanța	2017–18	Liga I	16	2	2	0	0	0	0	0	18	2
Viitorul Constanța	2018–19	Liga I	23	1	3	1	1 (Note: Appearance in UEFA Europa League)	0	—		27	2
Viitorul Constanța	2019–20	Liga I	32	3	1	0	0	0	—		33	3
Viitorul Constanța	2020–21	Liga I	35	9	1	0	—		—		36	9
Viitorul Constanța	Total		110	16	7	1	1	0	0	0	118	17
Farul Constanța	2021–22	Liga I	31	2	1	0	—		—		32	2
Rapid București	2022–23	Liga I	13	0	3	0	—		—		16	0
Politehnica Iaşi (loan)	2023–24	Liga I	11	0	0	0	—		—		11	0
Voluntari	2023–24	Liga I	9	0	2	0	—		—		11	0
Farul Constanța	2024–25	Liga I	23	0	3	1	—		—		26	1
Oțelul Galați	2025–26	Liga I	34	4	3	1	—		—		37	5
Oțelul Galați	2026–27	Liga I	13	0	1	0	—		—		14	0
Oțelul Galați	Total		47	4	4	1	—		—		51	5
Career total			244	22	20	3	1	0	0	0	265	25

== Honours ==
Viitorul Constanța

- Liga I: 2016–17
- Cupa României: 2018–19
- Supercupa României: 2019
