= Răzvan Matiș =

Romanian footballer (born 2001)

Personal information
- Full name: Răzvan Bogdan Matiș
- Date of birth: 25 January 2001 (age 25)
- Place of birth: Cluj-Napoca, Romania
- Height: 1.79 m (5 ft 10 in)
- Position: Midfielder

Team information
- Current team: CSM Slatina
- Number: 8

Youth career
- –2015: CFR Cluj
- 2015–2019: Gheorghe Hagi Academy

Senior career*
Years	Team	Apps	(Gls)
2019–2021	Viitorul Constanța	3	(0)
2019–2020	→ Argeș Pitești (loan)	23	(5)
2020	→ Petrolul Ploiești (loan)	4	(0)
2021–2023	Farul Constanța	0	(0)
2021–2022	→ Chindia Târgoviște (loan)	13	(0)
2022	→ Concordia Chiajna (loan)	14	(0)
2022	→ Gloria Buzău (loan)	11	(2)
2023	→ Unirea Dej (loan)	10	(0)
2023–2024	Chindia Târgoviște	16	(0)
2024–2025	SCM Zalău		
2025–2026	Ceahlăul Piatra Neamț	19	(0)
2026–	CSM Slatina	12	(3)

International career
2017–2018	Romania U17	4	(0)
- * Club domestic league appearances and goals as of 1 November 2026

Răzvan Bogdan Matiș (born 25 January 2001) is a Romanian professional footballer who plays as a midfielder for Liga III club CSM Slatina.

== Club career ==
Born in Cluj-Napoca, Matiș is an academy graduate of Gheorghe Hagi Academy. In the summer of 2019, aged 18, he was sent on a one-year loan to FC Argeș Pitești, for which he made his debut on 27 August in a 3–0 Liga II away win over Sportul Snagov. On 13 November that year, he scored his first senior goal in a 2–1 away victory over Dunărea Călărași.

Matiș totalled 21 games and five goals for "the White-Violets" during the season, as they finished as runners-up in the league and earned promotion to the Liga I. His deal was extended and featured in two games in the latter competition, before returning to the second tier on 10 September on loan at Petrolul Ploiești. After only making four appearances, he was recalled to Viitorul Constanța in late December.

Matiș made his debut for Viitorul on 4 April 2021, replacing Alexi Pitu in the 62nd minute of a 0–1 Liga I loss to Botoșani. For the following campaign, he was sent on loan to Chindia Târgoviște and Concordia Chiajna.

== Career statistics ==
As of match played 1 November 2026

Appearances and goals by club, season and competition
Club	Season	League			Cupa României		Continental		Other		Total	
Club	Season	Division	Apps	Goals	Apps	Goals	Apps	Goals	Apps	Goals	Apps	Goals
Viitorul Constanța	2020–21	Liga I	3	0	—		—		—		3	0
Argeș Pitești (loan)	2019–20	Liga II	21	5	—		—		—		21	5
Argeș Pitești (loan)	2020–21	Liga I	2	0	—		—		—		2	0
Argeș Pitești (loan)	Total		23	5	—		—		—		23	5
Petrolul Ploiești (loan)	2020–21	Liga II	4	0	1	0	—		—		5	0
Chindia Târgoviște (loan)	2021–22	Liga I	13	0	3	0	—		—		16	0
Concordia Chiajna (loan)	2021–22	Liga II	12	0	—		—		2 (Note: Appearances in Liga I promotion/relegation play-offs)	0	14	0
Gloria Buzău (loan)	2022–23	Liga II	11	2	3	0	—		—		14	2
Unirea Dej (loan)	2022–23	Liga II	10	0	—		—		—		10	0
Chindia Târgoviște	2023–24	Liga II	16	0	3	0	—		—		19	0
SCM Zalău	2024–25	Liga III	?	?	?	?	—		—		?	?
Ceahlăul Piatra Neamț	2025–26	Liga II	19	0	0	0	—		—		19	0
CSM Slatina	2026–27	Liga II	12	3	1	0	—		—		13	3
Career total			123	10	11	0	—		2	0	136	10
