= Suhaia =

- Commune
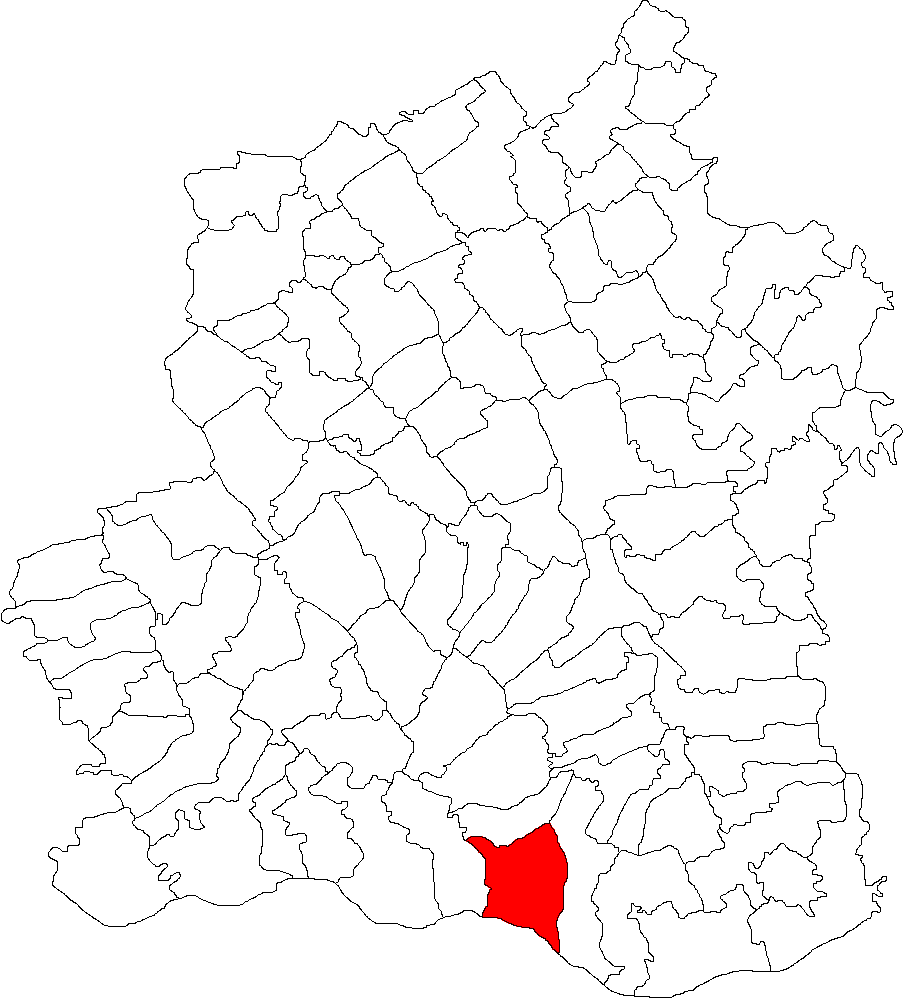
- Location in Teleorman County

- Location in Romania
- Coordinates: 43°44′N 25°15′E
- Country: Romania
- County: Teleorman

Government
  - Mayor (2020–2024): Polexia-Georgiana Barbu (PNL)
- Area: 74.85 km^{2} (28.90 sq mi)
- Elevation: 84 m (276 ft)
- Population (2021-12-01): 1,879
  - Density: 25/km^{2} (65/sq mi)
- Time zone: EET/EEST (UTC+2/+3)
- Postal code: 147370
- Area code: +(40) 247
- Vehicle reg.: TR
- Website: primariasuhaia.ro

Suhaia is a commune in Teleorman County, Muntenia, Romania. It is composed of a single village, Suhaia, but also included the village of Fântânele until 2004, when it was split off to form a separate commune.

The commune is situated at the southern edge of the Wallachian Plain, where the river Călmățui discharges into the Danube. It is located in the southern part of Teleorman County, 13 km (8.1 mi) northwest of Zimnicea, a port town on the Danube, and 40 km (25 mi) south of the county seat, Alexandria.
