= Luca Andronache =

Romanian footballer

Personal information
- Full name: Luca Cristian Andronache
- Date of birth: 26 July 2003 (age 23)
- Place of birth: Bucharest, Romania
- Height: 1.89 m (6 ft 2 in)
- Position: Winger

Youth career
- Viitorul Domnești
- –2019: FCSB
- 2019–2020: Gheorghe Hagi Academy

Senior career*
Years	Team	Apps	(Gls)
2020–2021	Viitorul Constanța	12	(0)
2021–2024	Farul Constanța	15	(1)
2024–2025	Oțelul Galați	10	(0)
2025–2026	SGV Freiberg	1	(0)

International career
2019	Romania U16	3	(0)
2019–2020	Romania U17	7	(1)
2021–2022	Romania U19	10	(3)
2021–2022	Romania U20	6	(1)
- * Club domestic league appearances and goals as of 1 November 2025

Luca Cristian Andronache (born 26 July 2003) is a Romanian professional footballer who plays as a winger.

== Club career ==
Andronache made his league debut on 5 August 2020 in Liga I match against FC Dinamo Bucuresti.

== Personal life ==
Luca Andronache is the son of football manager and former football player Vergil Andronache.

== Career statistics ==
As of match played 1 November 2025

Appearances and goals by club, season and competition
Club	Season	League			Cupa României		Europe		Other		Total	
Club	Season	Division	Apps	Goals	Apps	Goals	Apps	Goals	Apps	Goals	Apps	Goals
Viitorul Constanța	2019–20	Liga I	1	0	—		—		—		1	0
Viitorul Constanța	2020–21	Liga I	11	0	—		—		—		11	0
Viitorul Constanța	Total		12	0	—		—		—		12	0
Farul Constanța	2021–22	Liga I	2	0	—		—		—		2	0
Farul Constanța	2022–23	Liga I	3	0	2	0	—		—		5	0
Farul Constanța	2023–24	Liga I	10	1	2	0	2 (Note: Appearances in UEFA Europa Conference League)	0	0	0	14	1
Farul Constanța	Total		15	1	4	0	2	0	0	0	21	1
Oțelul Galați	2024–25	Liga I	10	0	1	0	—		—		11	0
SGV Freiberg	2025–26	Regionalliga Südwest	1	0	—		—		—		1	0
Career total			38	1	5	0	2	0	0	0	45	1

== Honours ==
Farul Constanța

- Liga I: 2022–23
- Supercupa României runner-up: 2023
