= Vergil Andronache =

Romanian footballer and manager

Personal information
- Date of birth: 16 September 1970 (age 56)
- Place of birth: Radomirești, Romania

Youth career
- Sportul Studențesc

Senior career*
Years	Team	Apps	(Gls)
- Sportul Studențesc

Managerial career
- 2012–2013: Sportul Studențesc
- 2013–2014: Juniorul București
- 2014–2018: Viitorul Domnești
- 2018–2019: CFR II Cluj
- 2019: FCSB (assistant)
- 2019: FCSB (caretaker)
- 2020–2021: CFR Cluj (assistant)
- 2021: CFR II Cluj
- 2022: Universitatea Craiova (assistant)
- * Club domestic league appearances and goals as of 5 August 2019

Vergil Andronache (also known as Virgil Andronache; born 16 September 1970) is a Romanian football manager and former football player. After spending most of his career as a player and as a manager with Sportul Studențesc, in 2018 he became the coach of CFR II Cluj, and in 2019 he moved to FCSB to work as an assistant.

== Club career ==
Andronache played professional football for only one club in his career, his former youth side Sportul Studențesc București.

== Coaching career ==
After ending his playing career he stayed at Sportul Studențesc and began coaching their youth teams. Later, he was appointed manager of the youth center, as well as the manager of the first squad of the club, between 2012 and 2013. After the bankruptcy of Sportul, Andronache took some young players and moved to Juniorul București, then to Viitorul Domnești, where he managed to end as runner-up in the Liga III.

Over time, Andronache promoted many players, Sportul's youth center being one of the most productive in the country. From the last generation of Sportul, Andronache took Octavian Vâlceanu, Paul Pațurcă, Bogdan Barbu, and Mihai Dobrescu to Juniorul, then to Domnești.

After a short spell at the second team of CFR Cluj, Andronache signed a contract with FCSB as an assistant coach, then, on 2 August 2019, he was named as the caretaker manager of the first squad, after the departure of Bogdan Andone.

== Personal life ==
His son, Luca, was also a football player.

=== Managerial statistics ===
As of 22 August 2019

Team	From	To	Record							
Team	From	To	G	W	D	L	GF	GA	GD	Win %
(Romania) Sportul Studențesc	10 September 2012	31 December 2012	11	6	1	4	18	12	+6	54.55
(Romania) Sportul Studențesc	4 June 2013	18 July 2013	2	1	0	1	4	6	−2	50.00
(Romania) FCSB	2 August 2019	23 August 2019	6	1	2	3	4	7	−3	16.67
Total			19	8	3	8	26	25	+1	42.11
