= Victor Fernández (footballer, born 1998) =

Spanish footballer

Víctor Fernández
Personal information
- Full name: Víctor Fernández Satué
- Date of birth: 2 May 1998 (age 28)
- Place of birth: Sant Cugat del Vallès, Spain
- Height: 1.74 m (5 ft 9 in)
- Position: Winger

Team information
- Current team: Niki Volos
- Number: 11

Youth career
- Sant Cugat Esport
- Cornellà

Senior career*
Years	Team	Apps	(Gls)
2016–2017	Cornellà	1	(0)
2017–2020	Newcastle United	0	(0)
2020–2021	Viitorul Constanța	5	(0)
2021	Botoșani	2	(0)
2021–2022	Cornellà	41	(4)
2022–2023	Volos	7	(0)
2023	Enosis Neon Paralimni	18	(3)
2023–2025	Nea Salamina	57	(2)
2025	Tirana	15	(0)
2026–	Niki Volos	8	(0)
- * Club domestic league appearances and goals as of 20 April 2026

Víctor Fernández Satué (born 2 May 1998) is a Spanish professional footballer who plays as a winger for Super League Greece 2 club Niki Volos.

== Club career ==
=== Cornella ===
Born in Sant Cugat del Vallès, Barcelona, Catalonia, Fernández started his career at FC Sant Cugat Esport before joining UE Cornellà's youth setup. On 3 January 2016, aged just 16, he made his first team debut by coming on as a late substitute in a 2–1 Segunda División B away win against CF Reus Deportiu.

=== Newcastle United ===
On 3 February 2017, Fernández moved abroad and joined Newcastle United, being assigned to the under-23 squad. In 2018, he suffered a heel injury, subsequently picking up a hip problem which kept him out for the entire 2018–19 campaign; he returned to action in July 2019.

On 31 July 2020, after being released by Newcastle, Fernández moved to Romanian Liga I side FC Viitorul Constanța after signing a three-year contract. He made his professional debut on 22 August, replacing Ștefan Bodișteanu in a 1–1 home draw against FC UTA Arad. He then joined FC Botosani for an undisclosed fee. He left them in the same month to join back his former club UE Cornellà on a free transfer on 30 January 2021. He made his second spell debut at the club in a 4–3 win to RCD Espanyol B. He scored the 3rd goal in the game after coming on as a substitute. On his second game for the Spanish club he scored another goal.
