= Iván Peñaranda =

Spanish footballer

Personal information
- Full name: Iván Peñaranda Llauradó
- Date of birth: 6 March 1981 (age 45)
- Place of birth: Santa Eulàlia, Spain
- Height: 1.86 m (6 ft 1 in)
- Position: Forward

Youth career
- Granollers
- 1991–1998: Barcelona

Senior career*
Years	Team	Apps	(Gls)
1998–2000	Mallorca B	11	(0)
2000–2007	AC Milan	0	(0)
2001	→ Sporting Gijón B (loan)	9	(1)
2001	→ Granada (loan)	1	(0)
2002	→ Sabadell (loan)	10	(0)
2002	→ Palamós (loan)	16	(8)
2002–2003	→ Santa Clara (loan)	1	(0)
2003–2004	→ Toledo (loan)	24	(1)
2004	→ Pachuca (loan)		
2004	→ Slavija (loan)	9	(1)
2005	→ Sporting Mahonés (loan)	6	(0)
2005	→ Vall d'Uixó (loan)	13	(5)
2005	→ Neftçi (loan)	1	(0)
2006	→ Burriana (loan)	2	(0)
2006–2007	→ Calasparra (loan)		
2007–2008	Ciudad Lorca	7	(2)
2008	Mataró		
2009	Ronda	4	(0)
Total		114	(18)
- * Club domestic league appearances and goals

Iván Peñaranda Llauradó (born 6 March 1981) is a Spanish former footballer who played as a forward.

After signing a contract with AC Milan at the age of 19, his career never developed, as he played for mostly in the lower leagues of his country – which included spells in amateur football – and abroad. In Spain, he played in four different divisions, but never in La Liga.

== Career ==
Born in Santa Eulàlia de Ronçana, Barcelona, Catalonia, Peñaranda was brought up at FC Barcelona, where he played alongside the likes of Gabri, Gerard or Carles Puyol. In the summer of 1998 he and his family moved to the Balearic Islands, and the 17-year-old joined local RCD Mallorca, being assigned to its reserves in the Segunda División where he shared teams with another future Spanish international, Diego Tristán.

In September 2000, AC Milan won the race with Real Madrid and signed Peñaranda to an eight-year contract. Barcelona fought for the player's rights as well, so the transfer licence was delayed, and he appeared only for the Primavera, adding two first-team friendlies; midway through that season, he returned to his country and was loaned to Sporting de Gijón B of Segunda División B.

Subsequently, Peñaranda began a series of unassuming loans: in quick succession, he represented Granada CF (one appearance, missing a penalty in the 89th minute with the score at 0–0), CE Sabadell FC and Palamós CF. He was brought to the last club as an emerging star by owner/manager Dmitry Pietrman, with the pair quickly feuding, which led to the player's release.

Peñaranda would have his only taste of top-flight football in the 2002–03 campaign, with Portugal's C.D. Santa Clara. With the Azores side eventually suffering Primeira Liga relegation, his input consisted of one game – 20 minutes, in a 5–0 away loss against Vitória de Guimarães– and he returned to Spain afterwards, joining third-tier CD Toledo.

From there onwards, Peñaranda's career went downhill as he never settled in a team and often changed countries, until his definite release by Milan in June 2006: abroad, he played in Mexico for C.F. Pachuca, Bosnia and Herzegovina with FK Slavija Sarajevo and Azerbaijan for Neftçi PFK.

Peñaranda moved to Ciudad de Lorca CF in the Tercera División in 2007. He continued competing at that level the following seasons.
