= Kevin Brobbey =

Dutch professional footballer (born 1993)

Personal information
- Full name: Kevin Luckassen Brobbey
- Date of birth: 27 July 1993 (age 33)
- Place of birth: Eindhoven, Netherlands
- Height: 1.85 m (6 ft 1 in)
- Position: Forward

Youth career
- Amstelveen Heemraad
- –2007: AVV Zeeburgia
- 2007–2008: AFC
- 2008–2013: AZ

Senior career*
Years	Team	Apps	(Gls)
2011–2013	AZ	0	(0)
2013–2014	Ross County	14	(0)
2014–2016	Slovan Liberec	35	(6)
2016–2017	SKN St. Pölten	23	(4)
2018	Northampton Town	4	(1)
2018–2019	Almere City	26	(2)
2020	Politehnica Iași	15	(5)
2020–2021	Viitorul Constanța	18	(9)
2021–2022	Kayserispor	14	(0)
2021–2022	→ Sepsi OSK (loan)	27	(6)
2022–2023	Rapid București	22	(2)
2023–2024	UTA Arad	25	(7)
2024–2025	Al-Batin	13	(1)
2025	Gloria Buzău	11	(5)
2025–2026	Argeș Pitești	21	(0)

International career
2010–2011	Netherlands U18	2	(0)
2011	Netherlands U19	3	(2)
- * Club domestic league appearances and goals as of 22 May 2026

Kevin Luckassen Brobbey (born 27 July 1993) is a Dutch professional footballer who plays as a forward.

== Club career ==
=== AZ Alkmaar ===
Born in Eindhoven, Brobbey started playing football in the street, leading him to play for his first youth club at Amstelveen Heemrad when he was eight after his mother took him there. He then played for AVV Zeeburgia and AFC Amsterdam before joining AZ Alkmaar in 2009, where he spent five years at the youth team before turning professional.

He was promoted to the AZ first team squad as an 18-year-old at the start of the 2011–12 season after signing his first professional contract. He made his AZ Alkmaar debut in the second round of KNVB Cup against FC Groningen, which they went on to win 4–2 after the game went extra time. However, Luckassen did not make another first team appearance for the next two seasons. At the end of the 2012–13 season, he was released.

=== Ross County ===
In July 2013, he signed a three-year deal with Scottish Premiership club Ross County. He made his debut in a 2–1 defeat against Celtic at Celtic Park in the opening game of the season. Despite suffering from injuries, Luckassen continued to be used in first team ins and out in the first half of the season, making 16 appearances in all competitions.

=== Slovan Liberec ===
After six months at Ross County, Brobbey left Ross County to join Gambrinus Liga side Slovan Liberec after the club accepted their bid.

Brobbey made his Slovan Liberec debut, where he started and played for 73 minutes before being substituted, in a 2–2 draw against FK Mladá Boleslav on 23 February 2014. Brobbey scored his first goal on 7 March 2014, as Slovan Liberec won 1–0 against Zbrojovka Brno. He followed up his second goal two weeks later on 21 March 2014, in a 3–0 win over Jablonec.

On 22 August 2014, he scored his first goal of the season, in a 2–2 draw against FK Teplice. By April, Lukassen scored two more goals against Mladá Boleslav and FK Teplice. Brobbey helped his side win the Czech Cup after beating FK Jablonec 2–1 in the final. In the 2015–16 season, he scored on his first appearance of the season on 16 August 2015, in a 1–1 draw against FK Jablonec. Despite suffering from an injury setback, Luckassen went on to make 13 appearances and scored 3 times in all competitions.

=== SKN St. Pölten ===
Brobbey joined SKN St. Pölten on 8 July 2016, signing a two–year contract with the club.

Brobbey made his SKN St. Pölten debut, where he set up a goal for Manuel Hartl, who scored a header, in a 2–1 loss against Austria Wien in the opening game of the season. He then scored his first goal for the club on 15 October 2016, in a 1–1 draw against Admira Wacker Mödling. It was not until 29 April 2017 when he scored a brace and set up one of the goals, in a 3–3 draw against Rheindorf Altach.

However, ahead of the 2017–18 season, Brobbey's contract got terminated by the club on 19 July 2017, after a fight with a teammate during training.

=== Northampton Town ===
On 8 March 2018, Brobbey joined EFL League One side Northampton Town on a deal until the end of the season.

Brobbey scored the equaliser in his debut against Bristol Rovers on 10 March 2018. However, he soon lost his first team place after suffering a back injury and was sidelined for the rest of the season. He was released by Northampton at the end of the 2017–18 season, following their relegation.

== International career ==
Though born in Eindhoven, Netherlands, Brobbey expressed a desire to play for Ghana, as his parents are Ghanaian. He previously represented Netherlands U18 and Netherlands U19.

== Career statistics ==
=== Club ===
As of match played 22 May 2026

Club	Season	League			National cup (Note: Includes KNVB Beker, Scottish Cup, Czech Cup, Austrian Cup, Cupa României, King's Cup)		Europe		Other		Total	
Club	Season	Division	Apps	Goals	Apps	Goals	Apps	Goals	Apps	Goals	Apps	Goals
AZ	2011–12	Eredivisie	0	0	1	0	0	0	–		1	0
AZ	2012–13	Eredivisie	0	0	0	0	0	0	–		0	0
AZ	Total		0	0	1	0	0	0	–		1	0
Ross County	2013–14	Scottish Premiership	14	0	1	0	–		1 (Note: Appearance in Scottish League Cup)	0	16	0
Slovan Liberec	2013–14	Czech First League	10	2	–		0	0	–		10	2
Slovan Liberec	2014–15	Czech First League	16	2	5	1	3 (Note: Appearances in UEFA Europa League)	0	–		24	3
Slovan Liberec	2015–16	Czech First League	9	2	3	0	1	1	–		13	3
Slovan Liberec	Total		35	6	8	1	4	1	0	0	47	8
SKN St. Pölten	2016–17	Austrian Bundesliga	23	4	2	0	–		–		25	4
Northampton Town	2017–18	League One	4	1	–		–		–		4	1
Almere City	2018–19	Eerste Divisie	26	2	2	1	–		2 (Note: Appearances in Eredivisie promotion/relegation play-offs)	0	4	1
Politehnica Iași	2019–20	Liga I	15	5	2	0	–		–		17	5
Viitorul Constanța	2020–21	Liga I	18	9	1	0	–		–		19	9
Kayserispor	2020–21	Süper Lig	14	0	–		–		–		14	0
Sepsi OSK (loan)	2021–22	Liga I	27	6	4	0	–		–		31	6
Rapid București	2022–23	Liga I	22	2	2	1	–		–		24	3
UTA Arad	2023–24	Liga I	25	7	0	0	–		–		25	7
Al-Batin	2024–25	Saudi First Division League	13	1	1	0	–		–		4	1
Gloria Buzău	2024–25	Liga I	11	5	–		–		–		11	5
Argeș Pitești	2025–26	Liga I	21	0	4	4	–		–		25	4
Career total			268	48	26	7	4	1	3	0	301	56

== Personal life ==
Brobbey is a brother of Brian Brobbey, Samuel Brobbey, and Derrick Luckassen.

Growing up, he supported AFC Ajax, due to his association at Amstelveen Heemrad and growing up in Amsterdam. In addition to speaking Dutch, Luckassen speaks English and as of 2014 he was learning Czech.

== Honours ==
Slovan Liberec

- Czech Cup: 2014–15
- Czech Supercup runner-up: 2015

Sepsi OSK

- Cupa României: 2021–22
