= CD Ronda =

Spanish football team

Ronda
- Full name: Club Deportivo Ronda
- Founded: 11 July 1923; 102 years ago
- Ground: Ciudad Deportiva, Ronda, Spain
- Capacity: 2,000
- Chairman: (Spain) Francisco Harillo
- League: Primera Andaluza Málaga
- 2024–25: Primera Andaluza Málaga, 4th of 16
Home colours	Away colours

Club Deportivo Ronda is a Spanish football team based in Ronda, Province of Málaga, in the autonomous community of Andalusia. Founded in 1923, it plays in Primera Andaluza Málaga, holding home matches at Ciudad Deportiva, with a 2,000-seat capacity.

== History ==
=== Club background ===
- Ronda Fútbol Club (1923–1926; 1931–1941)
- Club Deportivo Ronda (1926–1931; 1948–1955; 1974–)
- Ronda Club de Fútbol (1941–1948)
- Club Deportivo Ronda Centro Obrero Católico (1955–1966)
- Atlético Ronda Centro Obrero Católico (1966–1974)

== Season to season ==
Season	Tier	Division	Place	Copa del Rey
1931–1954	—	Regional	—	
1954–55	4	1ª Reg.	2nd	
1955–56	3	3ª	12th	
1956–57	3	3ª	7th	
1957–58	3	3ª	16th	
1958–59	3	3ª	6th	
1959–60	3	3ª	10th	
1960–61	3	3ª	8th	
1961–62	3	3ª	11th	
1962–63	3	3ª	12th	
1963–64	3	3ª	7th	
1964–65	3	3ª	10th	
1965–66	3	3ª	(R)	
1966–67	5	2ª Reg.		
1967–68	5	2ª Reg.		
1968–69	5	2ª Reg.		
1969–70	4	1ª Reg.	9th	
1970–71	5	2ª Reg.		
1971–72	5	2ª Reg.	2nd	
1972–73	5	2ª Reg.		

Season	Tier	Division	Place	Copa del Rey
1973–74	5	2ª Reg.		
1974–75	4	1ª Reg.	5th	
1975–76	4	Reg. Pref.	15th	
1976–77	4	Reg. Pref.	13th	
1977–78	5	Reg. Pref.	14th	
1978–79	5	Reg. Pref.	18th	
1979–80	5	Reg. Pref.	15th	
1980–81	4	3ª	10th	
1981–82	4	3ª	18th	
1982–83	5	Reg. Pref.	7th	
1983–84	5	Reg. Pref.	1st	
1984–85	4	3ª	5th	
1985–86	4	3ª	3rd	Second round
1986–87	4	3ª	4th	Second round
1987–88	3	2ª B	17th	First round
1988–89	4	3ª	4th	First round
1989–90	4	3ª	4th	
1990–91	4	3ª	17th	First round
1991–92	4	3ª	17th	
1992–93	5	Reg. Pref.	7th	

Season	Tier	Division	Place	Copa del Rey
1993–94	5	Reg. Pref.	7th	
1994–95	5	Reg. Pref.	5th	
1995–96	5	Reg. Pref.	3rd	
1996–97	5	Reg. Pref.	1st	
1997–98	4	3ª	11th	
1998–99	4	3ª	20th	
1999–2000	5	Reg. Pref.	15th	
2000–01	5	Reg. Pref.	15th	
2001–02	5	Reg. Pref.	1st	
2002–03	5	Reg. Pref.	1st	
2003–04	5	Reg. Pref.	2nd	
2004–05	5	1ª And.	2nd	
2005–06	5	1ª And.	3rd	
2006–07	5	1ª And.	4th	
2007–08	5	1ª And.	1st	
2008–09	4	3ª	12th	
2009–10	4	3ª	5th	
2010–11	4	3ª	5th	
2011–12	4	3ª	12th	
2012–13	4	3ª	14th	

Season	Tier	Division	Place	Copa del Rey
2013–14	4	3ª	15th	
2014–15	4	3ª	14th	
2015–16	4	3ª	19th	
2016–17	5	Div. Hon.	15th	
2017–18	6	1ª And.	11th	
2018–19	6	1ª And.	9th	
2019–20	6	1ª And.	3rd	
2020–21	6	1ª And.	1st	
2021–22	7	1ª And.	8th	
2022–23	7	1ª And.	13th	
2023–24	7	1ª And.	4th	
2024–25	7	1ª And.	4th	
2025–26	7	1ª And.		

- 1 season in Segunda División B
- 26 seasons in Tercera División

== Former players ==
- (Equatorial Guinea) Kelvin Onosiughe
- (Philippines) Ángel Guirado
- (Spain) Iván Peñaranda

== Former coaches ==
- (Spain) Enrique Mateos
