= Stoicănești =

- Commune
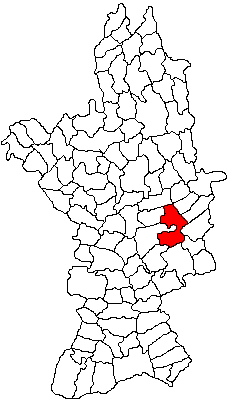
- Location in Olt County

- Location in Romania
- Coordinates: 44°11′N 24°38′E
- Country: Romania
- County: Olt
- Area: 93.31 km^{2} (36.03 sq mi)
- Population (2021-12-01): 2,140
  - Density: 22.9/km^{2} (59.4/sq mi)
- Time zone: UTC+02:00 (EET)
  - Summer (DST): UTC+03:00 (EEST)
- Vehicle reg.: OT

Stoicănești is a commune in Olt County, Muntenia, Romania. It is composed of a single village, Stoicănești.
