= Jô Santos =

Brazilian footballer

Personal information
- Full name: Joálisson Santos Oliveira
- Date of birth: 31 March 1991 (age 35)
- Place of birth: Campina Grande, Brazil
- Height: 1.74 m (5 ft 9 in)
- Position: Winger

Team information
- Current team: Central
- Number: 9

Youth career
- –2008: Campinense
- 2008–2009: Esporte Clube Vitória

Senior career*
Years	Team	Apps	(Gls)
2010–2012	Rio Preto	39	(11)
2012	São Bernardo	0	(0)
2012–2014	Tondela	28	(3)
2014–2015	Freamunde	40	(0)
2015	Zimbru Chișinău	12	(4)
2016–2019	Sheriff Tiraspol	16	(4)
2017–2018	→ Politehnica Iași (loan)	27	(5)
2019	Ventspils	14	(3)
2019–2021	Hermannstadt	41	(3)
2021	Viitorul Constanța	17	(4)
2021–2022	Al-Riffa	0	(0)
2022	Radomiak Radom	5	(0)
2022–2023	Turan	8	(1)
2023	Bylis	13	(3)
2023–2024	Sulut United	5	(1)
2024	RANS Nusantara	4	(1)
2025–	Campinense	9	(2)
2025–	→ Central (loan)	6	(1)
- * Club domestic league appearances and goals as of 25 May 2025

Joálisson Santos Oliveira (born 31 March 1991), commonly known as Jô Santos (Brazilian Portuguese: [ʒo ˈsɐ̃tus]), is a Brazilian professional footballer who plays as a winger for Campeonato Brasileiro Série D club Central.

== Club career ==
=== Sheriff Tiraspol ===
On 13 January 2016, Jô Santos signed for Sheriff Tiraspol. He left Sheriff Tiraspol when his contract expired on 31 December 2018.

=== Politehnica Iași ===
On 2 August 2017, Jô Santos moved to Romanian club Politehnica Iași, and signed a one-year contract with the moldavian team. Later that month, he made his Liga I debut against Dinamo București, and scored a goal to earn Politehnica Iași a 2–1 victory. Santos returned to Sheriff Tiraspol after his loan deal on 3 July 2018.

=== Ventspils ===
On 25 January 2019, Ventspils announced the signing of Santos.

=== Hermannstadt ===
On 12 July 2019, Jô Santos returned to the Romanian Liga I and signed with Hermannstadt.

== Honours ==
Sheriff Tiraspol

- Divizia Națională: 2015–16, 2016–17
- Moldovan Cup: 2016–17
- Moldovan Supercup: 2016
