= Dracea =

- Commune
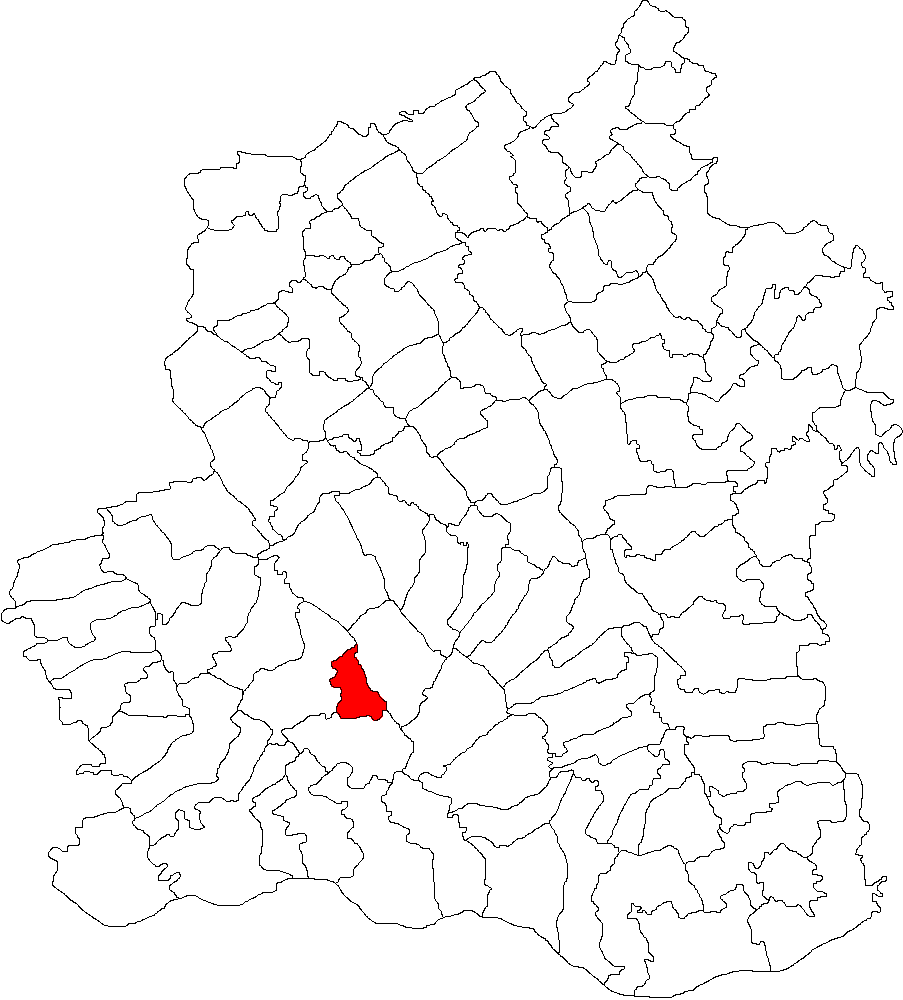
- Location in Teleorman County

- Location in Romania
- Coordinates: 43°52′N 25°01′E
- Country: Romania
- County: Teleorman
- Subdivisions: Dracea, Florica, Zlata

Government
  - Mayor (2020–2024): Cristian-Adrian Tismănaru (PNL)
- Area: 42.18 km^{2} (16.29 sq mi)
- Elevation: 39 m (128 ft)
- Population (2021-12-01): 1,575
  - Density: 37/km^{2} (97/sq mi)
- Time zone: EET/EEST (UTC+2/+3)
- Postal code: 147101
- Area code: +(40) 247
- Vehicle reg.: TR
- Website: primaria-dracea.ro

Dracea (Romanian pronunciation: [ˈdrat͡ʃe̯a]) is a commune in Teleorman County, Muntenia, Romania. It is composed of three villages: Dracea, Florica, and Zlata. These were part of Crângu Commune until 2004, when they were split off.
