= Sorin Rădoi =

Romanian footballer

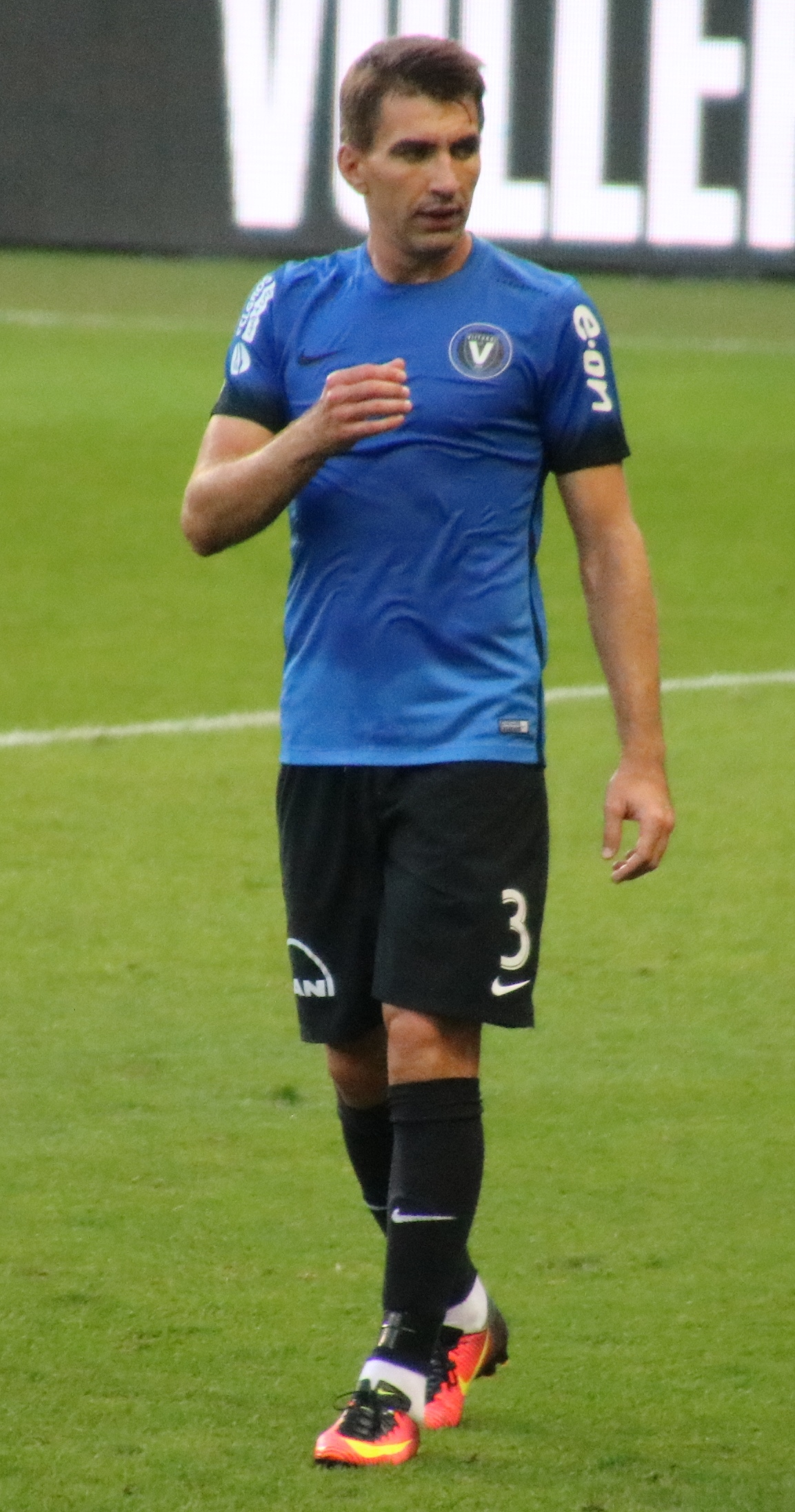
- Rădoi playing for Viitorul Constanța in 2017

Personal information
- Full name: Sorin Nicușor Rădoi
- Date of birth: 30 June 1985 (age 41)
- Place of birth: Craiova, Romania
- Height: 1.80 m (5 ft 11 in)
- Position: Right back

Team information
- Current team: UTA Arad (assistant)

Youth career
- –2002: Școala de Fotbal Gheorghe Popescu

Senior career*
Years	Team	Apps	(Gls)
2003–2004	Extensiv Craiova	19	(0)
2003	→ Sportul Studențesc (loan)	3	(0)
2004–2005	Sportul Studențesc	19	(0)
2005–2007	Politehnica Timișoara	37	(1)
2007	Politehnica II Timișoara	6	(0)
2008	Universitatea Cluj	9	(0)
2008–2010	Unirea Urziceni	0	(0)
2009–2010	→ Unirea Alba Iulia (loan)	20	(0)
2010–2013	Chindia Târgoviște	37	(1)
2013–2016	Voluntari	40	(4)
2016–2018	Viitorul Constanța	8	(0)
Total		198	(6)

International career
2001	Romania U16	3	(0)
2002	Romania U17	2	(0)
2004	Romania U19	5	(0)
2005–2006	Romania U21	5	(0)

Managerial career
- 2018–2020: Viitorul Constanța (assistant)
- 2020: Viitorul Constanța U15
- 2020–2021: Viitorul Constanța (assistant)
- 2021–2023: Farul II Constanța
- 2023–: UTA Arad (assistant)
- * Club domestic league appearances and goals

Sorin Nicușor Rădoi (born 30 June 1985) is a Romanian former professional footballer who played as a right back, currently assistant coach at Liga I club UTA Arad.

== Club career ==
Rădoi's first club was Extensiv Craiova, where he made his debut in the Romanian Liga II in the 2002–03 season.

He left Craiova for one of Bucharest's outsider teams, Sportul Studențesc, with whom he won promotion to the first league. Rădoi played 19 matches for Sportul in the 2004–05 Liga I season.

In the summer of 2005, Rădoi and Sportul Studențesc teammate, Gheorghe Bucur (Liga I top goalscorer at the time), moved to FC Politehnica Timișoara.

In 2008, Rădoi was transferred to U Cluj for whom he played his first match against Rapid București.

== Honours ==
Unirea Urziceni

- Liga I: 2008–09

Chindia Târgoviște

- Liga III: 2010–11

FC Voluntari

- Liga II: 2014–15
- Liga III: 2013–14

Viitorul Constanța

- Liga I: 2016–17
