= Damien Dussaut =

French footballer (born 1994)

Personal information
- Full name: Damien Dylan Dussaut
- Date of birth: 8 November 1994 (age 32)
- Place of birth: Créteil, France
- Height: 1.82 m (6 ft 0 in)
- Position: Right back

Team information
- Current team: Dumbrăvița
- Number: 21

Youth career
- 2001–2009: Créteil
- 2004–2007: → Sénart-Moissy (loan)
- 2009–2010: Clairefontaine
- 2010–2013: Valenciennes

Senior career*
Years	Team	Apps	(Gls)
2011–2014	Valenciennes B	39	(1)
2013–2014	Valenciennes	0	(0)
2014–2015	Standard Liège	9	(0)
2016–2019	Sint-Truiden	54	(2)
2019	Dinamo București	10	(0)
2019–2021	Viitorul Constanța	38	(1)
2021–2022	Farul Constanța	30	(1)
2022–2023	Rapid București	1	(0)
2023–2024	Farul Constanța	29	(0)
2024–2025	UTA Arad	14	(0)
2026–	Dumbrăvița	17	(0)

International career^{‡}
2012–2013	France U19	2	(0)
2013–2015	France U20	4	(0)
2022–	Martinique	4	(0)
Medal record
Representing France
Winner	Toulon Tournament	2015
- * Club domestic league appearances and goals as of 31 October 2026 ‡ National team caps and goals as of 22 March 2025

Damien Dylan Dussaut (born 8 November 1994) is a professional footballer who plays as a right back for Liga II club Dumbrăvița. Born in mainland France, he plays for the Martinique national team.

== Club career ==
Dussaut is a youth exponent from Valenciennes. In 2014, he joined Belgian Pro League side Standard Liège. He made his Belgian Pro League debut at 7 December 2014 in a 0–1 away win against Charleroi.

In January 2019, he signed a contract with Dinamo București. He left Dinamo in July 2019 and two months later he reached an agreement with Viitorul Constanța, signing a contract for three years.

== International career ==
Dussaut was born in mainland France and is of Martiniquais descent. He was called up to the Martinique national team for 2022–23 CONCACAF Nations League matches in June 2022.

=== International stats ===
As of match played 22 March 2025

Appearances and goals by national team and year
National team	Year	Apps	Goals
Martinique	2022	1	0
Martinique	2023	2	0
Martinique	2024	0	0
Martinique	2023	1	0
Total		4	0

== Honours ==
Farul Constanța

- Supercupa României runner-up: 2023

France U20

- Toulon Tournament: 2015
