= Carlo Casap =

Romanian footballer

Personal information
- Full name: Carlo Roberto Casap
- Date of birth: 29 December 1998 (age 27)
- Place of birth: Timișoara, Romania
- Height: 1.78 m (5 ft 10 in)
- Position: Midfielder

Youth career
- 2005–2012: Politehnica Timișoara
- 2012–2015: Gheorghe Hagi Academy

Senior career*
Years	Team	Apps	(Gls)
2015–2021	Viitorul Constanța	50	(6)
2021–2023	Farul Constanța	29	(1)
2022	→ Concordia Chiajna (loan)	5	(0)
2023–2024	Botoșani	5	(0)
2024–2025	Farul Constanța	21	(1)
2025–2026	Prishtina e Re	1	(0)
2026	Dumbrăvița	0	(0)

International career
2014–2015	Romania U17	2	(0)
2016	Romania U18	1	(0)
2017–2020	Romania U21	4	(0)
- * Club domestic league appearances and goals as of 6 December 2025

Carlo Casap (born 29 December 1998) is a Romanian professional footballer who plays as a midfielder.

== Career statistics ==
As of 10 February 2026

Appearances and goals by club, season and competition
Club	Season	League			National cup (Note: Includes Cupa României, Kosovar Cup)		League cup (Note: Includes Cupa Ligii)		Europe		Other		Total	
Club	Season	Division	Apps	Goals	Apps	Goals	Apps	Goals	Apps	Goals	Apps	Goals	Apps	Goals
Viitorul Constanța	2014–15	Liga I	1	1	—		—		—		—		1	1
Viitorul Constanța	2015–16	Liga I	2	1	—		2	0	—		—		4	1
Viitorul Constanța	2016–17	Liga I	15	2	1	0	1	0	2 (Note: Appearances in UEFA Europa League)	0	—		19	2
Viitorul Constanța	2017–18	Liga I	5	0	0	0	0	0	0	0	1 (Note: Appearance in Supercupa României)	0	6	0
Viitorul Constanța	2018–19	Liga I	6	1	3	0	0	0	0	0	—		9	1
Viitorul Constanța	2019–20	Liga I	12	0	1	0	0	0	0	0	0	0	13	0
Viitorul Constanța	2020–21	Liga I	9	1	0	0	—		—		1 (Note: Appearance in Liga I play-offs for UEFA Europa Conference League)	0	10	1
Viitorul Constanța	Total		50	6	5	0	3	0	2	0	2	0	62	6
Farul Constanța	2021–22	Liga I	0	0	—		—		—		—		0	0
Farul Constanța	2022–23	Liga I	29	1	3	1	—		—		—		32	2
Farul Constanța	Total		29	1	3	1	—		—		—		32	2
Concordia Chiajna (loan)	2021–22	Liga II	5	0	—		—		—		—		5	0
Botoşani	2023–24	Liga I	8	0	3	1	—		—		—		11	1
Farul Constanța	2023–24	Liga I	2	0	—		—		—		—		2	0
Farul Constanța	2024–25	Liga I	19	1	3	0	—		—		—		22	1
Farul Constanța	2025–26	Liga I	0	0	0	0	—		—		—		0	0
Farul Constanța	Total		21	1	3	0	—		—		—		24	1
Prishtina e Re	2025–26	Superleague of Kosovo	1	0	1	0	—		—		—		2	0
Dumbrăvița	2025–26	Liga II	0	0	1	0	—		—		—		1	0
Career total			114	8	16	2	3	0	2	0	2	0	137	10

== Honours ==
Viitorul Constanța

- Liga I: 2016–17
- Cupa României: 2018–19
- Supercupa României: 2019

Farul Constanța

- Liga I: 2022–23
