= Radu Boboc =

Romanian footballer (born 1999)

Personal information
- Full name: Radu Ștefăniță Boboc
- Date of birth: 24 April 1999 (age 27)
- Place of birth: Craiova, Romania
- Height: 1.80 m (5 ft 11 in)
- Position: Full-back

Team information
- Current team: Bruk-Bet Termalica
- Number: 27

Youth career
- 2010–2015: Școala de Fotbal Gheorghe Popescu
- 2015–2018: Gheorghe Hagi Academy

Senior career*
Years	Team	Apps	(Gls)
2018–2021	Viitorul Constanța	87	(2)
2021–2022	Farul Constanța	26	(1)
2022–2023	FCSB	5	(0)
2023–2024	Voluntari	34	(2)
2024–2025	Universitatea Cluj	30	(1)
2025–	Bruk-Bet Termalica	36	(1)

International career
2014	Romania U15	2	(0)
2014–2015	Romania U16	3	(0)
2015	Romania U17	3	(0)
2016	Romania U18	3	(0)
2017–2018	Romania U19	3	(0)
2018–2021	Romania U21	16	(0)
2021	Romania Olympic	4	(0)
- * Club domestic league appearances and goals as of 19 September 2026

Radu Ștefăniță Boboc (born 24 April 1999) is a Romanian professional footballer who plays as a full-back for I liga club Bruk-Bet Termalica.

== Career statistics ==
As of match played 19 September 2026

Appearances and goals by club, season and competition
Club	Season	League			National cup (Note: Includes Cupa României, Polish Cup)		Continental		Other		Total	
Club	Season	Division	Apps	Goals	Apps	Goals	Apps	Goals	Apps	Goals	Apps	Goals
Viitorul Constanța	2018–19	Liga I	22	0	5	0	1 (Note: Appearance in UEFA Europa League)	0	—		28	0
Viitorul Constanța	2019–20	Liga I	33	2	1	0	0	0	0	0	34	2
Viitorul Constanța	2020–21	Liga I	32	0	1	0	—		—		33	0
Viitorul Constanța	Total		87	2	7	0	1	0	0	0	95	2
Farul Constanța	2021–22	Liga I	25	1	1	0	—		—		26	1
Farul Constanța	2022–23	Liga I	1	0	—		—		—		1	0
Farul Constanța	Total		26	1	1	0	—		—		27	1
FCSB	2022–23	Liga I	5	0	3	0	2 (Note: Appearances in UEFA Europa Conference League)	0	—		10	0
Voluntari	2023–24	Liga I	34	2	2	0	—		—		36	2
Universitatea Cluj	2024–25	Liga I	30	1	1	0	—		—		31	1
Bruk-Bet Termalica	2025–26	Ekstraklasa	27	0	1	0	—		—		28	0
Bruk-Bet Termalica	2026–27	I liga	9	1	1	0	—		—		10	1
Bruk-Bet Termalica	Total		36	1	2	0	—		—		38	1
Career total			218	7	16	0	3	0	0	0	237	7

== Honours ==
Viitorul Constanța

- Cupa României: 2018–19
