= Stejar =

Stejar may refer to:

- Stejar, a village in Vărădia de Mureș Commune, Arad County, Romania
- Stejar, a brand of beer made by SABMiller in Romania
- Stejar (river), a tributary of the Mureș in Arad County, Romania

== See also ==
- Stejarelul (disambiguation)
- Stejeriș (disambiguation)
