= Crângu =

- Commune
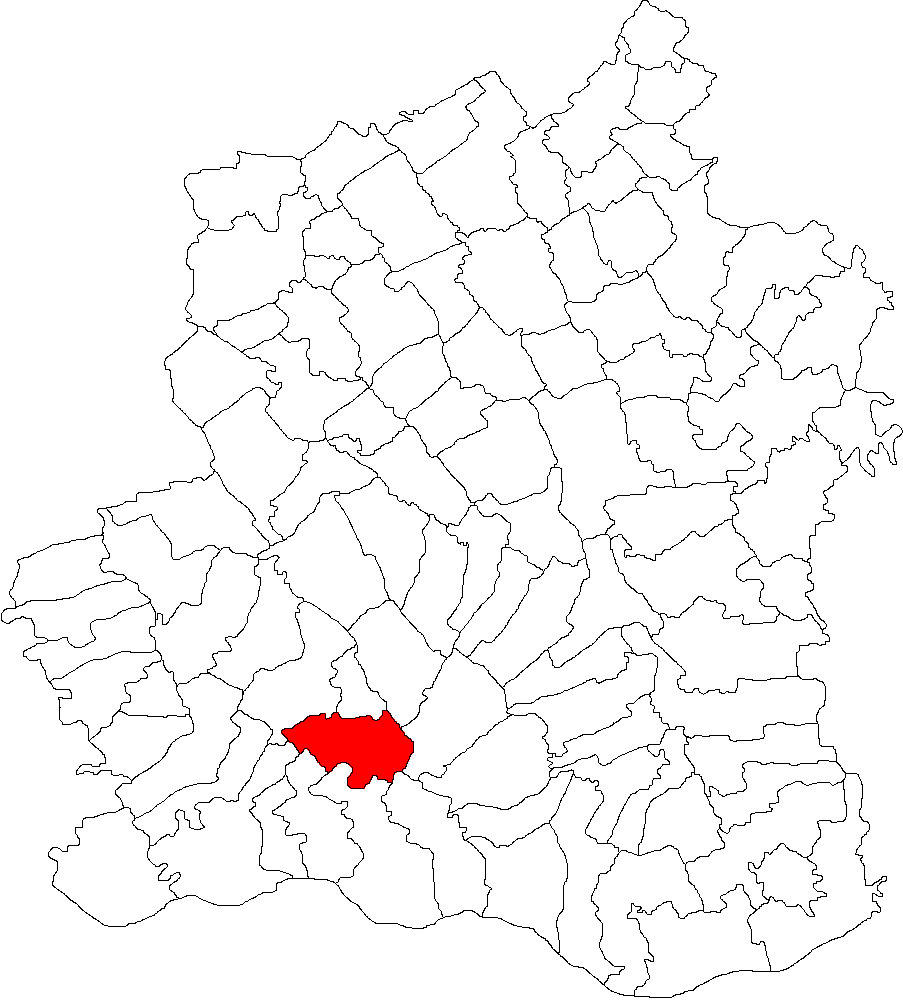
- Location in Teleorman County

- Location in Romania
- Coordinates: 43°51′N 25°04′E
- Country: Romania
- County: Teleorman
- Subdivisions: Crângu, Secara
- Population (2021-12-01): 1,366
- Time zone: UTC+02:00 (EET)
  - Summer (DST): UTC+03:00 (EEST)
- Vehicle reg.: TR

Crângu (Romanian pronunciation: [ˈkrɨŋgu]) is a commune in Teleorman County, Muntenia, Romania. It is composed of two villages, Crângu and Secara. It included three other villages until 2004, when they were split off to form Dracea Commune.
