= Radomirești =

- Commune
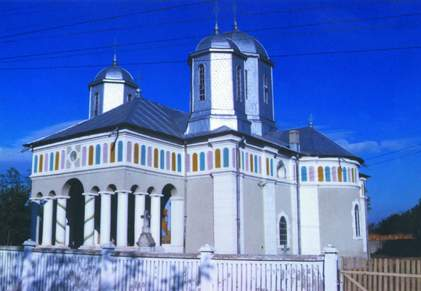
- Orthodox Church of the Assumption of Mary

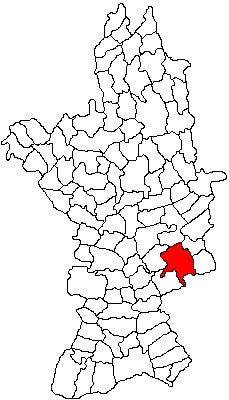
- Location in Olt County

- Location in Romania
- Coordinates: 44°05′N 24°42′E
- Country: Romania
- County: Olt

Government
  - Mayor (2024–2028): Nicușor Sîia (PSD)
- Area: 101.68 km^{2} (39.26 sq mi)
- Elevation: 117 m (384 ft)
- Population (2021-12-01): 2,568
  - Density: 25.26/km^{2} (65.41/sq mi)
- Time zone: UTC+02:00 (EET)
  - Summer (DST): UTC+03:00 (EEST)
- Postal code: 237365
- Area code: +(40) 249
- Vehicle reg.: OT
- Website: www.primariaradomiresti.ro

Radomirești is a commune in Olt County, Muntenia, Romania. It is composed of four villages: Călinești, Crăciunei, Poiana, and Radomirești.

On Radomirești, 68 ancient Greek silver coins from the 2nd century were discovered in 13 March 2021 by Paul Durca, a retired police officer, with a metal detector.

== Natives ==
- Vergil Andronache (born 1970), football manager and former football player
