= Crângeni =

- Commune
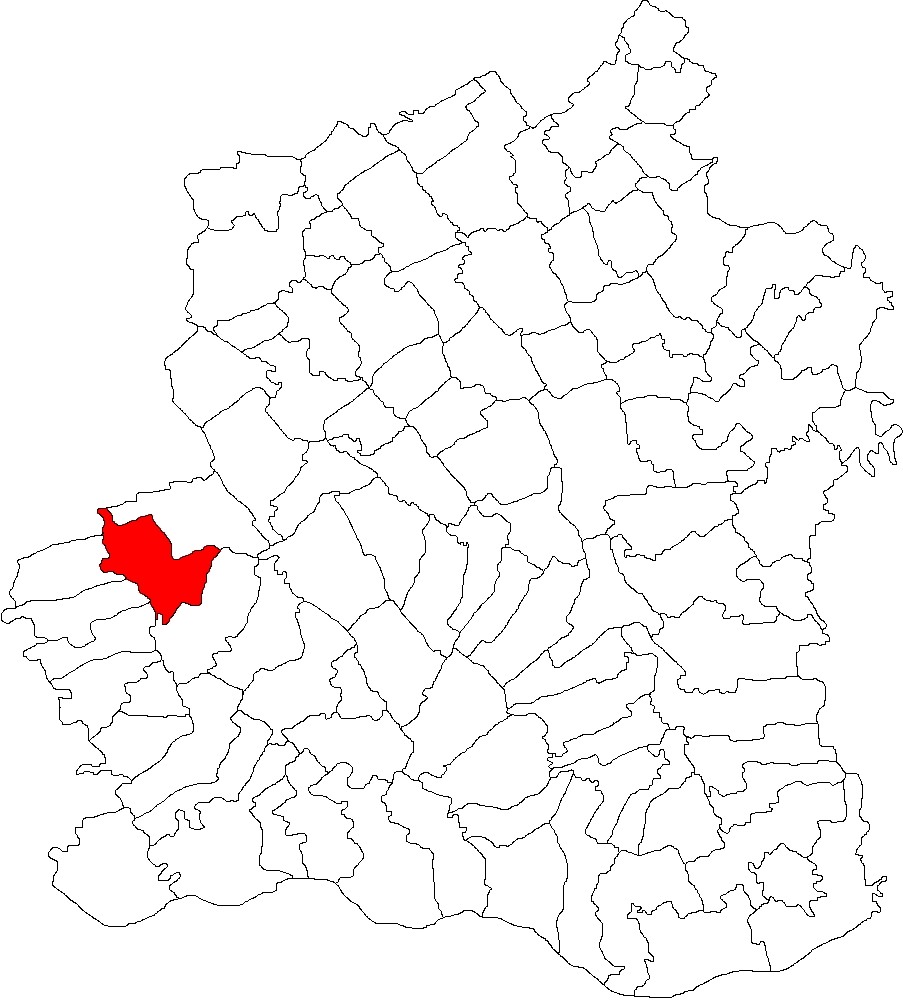
- Location in Teleorman County

- Location in Romania
- Coordinates: 44°02′N 24°47′E
- Country: Romania
- County: Teleorman
- Subdivisions: Balta Sărată, Crângeni, Dorobanțu, Stejaru
- Population (2021-12-01): 2,274
- Time zone: EET/EEST (UTC+2/+3)
- Vehicle reg.: TR

Crângeni (Romanian pronunciation: [krɨnˈd͡ʒenʲ]) is a commune in Teleorman County, Muntenia, Romania. It is composed of four villages: Balta Sărată, Crângeni, Dorobanțu and Stejaru.
