= 2018–19 FC Viitorul Constanța season =

Viitorul Constanța
2018–19 season
- Chairman: Pavel Peniu
- Manager: Gheorghe Hagi
- Stadium: Viitorul
- Liga I: 3rd
- Cupa României: Winners
- Europa League: 2nd qualifying round
- Top goalscorer: League: Ianis Hagi (10); All: Ianis Hagi (14)
Home colours	Away colours

The 2018–19 season was the 10th season of competitive football by Viitorul Constanța, and the 7th consecutive in the Liga I. Viitorul Constanța competed in the Liga I, Cupa României and Europa League. The club won their first Romanian Cup on 25 May 2019, defeating Astra Giurgiu in the final.

== Previous season positions ==
	Competition	Position
(European Union)	UEFA Champions League	Third qualifying round
(European Union)	UEFA Europa League	Play-off round
(Romania)	Liga I	4th
(Romania)	Cupa României	Round of 16

== Players ==
=== First-team squad ===
Note: Flags indicate national team as defined under FIFA eligibility rules; some limited exceptions apply. Players may hold more than one non-FIFA nationality.

No.	Pos.	Nation	Player
1	GK	ROU	Árpád Tordai
2	DF	ROU	Virgil Ghiță
3	MF	ESP	Dani López
4	DF	NED	Bas Kuipers
5	MF	ROU	Sebastian Mladen
6	DF	NED	Bradley de Nooijer
7	MF	ROU	Alexandru Mățan
8	MF	ROU	Carlo Casap
9	FW	BRA	Rivaldinho (on loan from Levski Sofia)
10	MF	ROU	Ianis Hagi (Captain)
11	MF	ROU	Ionuț Vînă
12	GK	ROU	Valentin Cojocaru
13	FW	ROU	Denis Drăguș
14	MF	ROU	Roberto Mălăele
15	DF	ROU	Bogdan Țîru (Vice-Captain)
16	MF	ROU	Vlad Achim

No.	Pos.	Nation	Player
17	MF	ROU	Andrei Ciobanu
18	FW	ROU	George Ganea
20	MF	ROU	Andrei Tîrcoveanu
21	MF	ROU	Paul Iacob
24	MF	BRA	Eric
27	DF	ROU	Radu Boboc
30	MF	ROU	Andreias Calcan
31	GK	ROU	Alexandru Buzbuchi
43	GK	ROU	Paul Șerban
91	MF	ROU	Alexi Pitu
93	MF	ROU	Andrei Artean
96	MF	FRA	Lyes Houri
98	DF	ROU	Marius Leca
99	MF	ROU	Tudor Băluță (on loan from Brighton)

=== Transfers ===
In:

No.	Pos.	Nation	Player
—	MF	ROU	Paul Iacob (loan return from Dunărea Călărași)
—	MF	ROU	Florin Nicolescu (loan return from Afumați)
—	FW	ROU	Alexandru Stoica (loan return from Dunărea Călărași)
—	DF	ROU	Robert Băjan (from Pandurii Târgu Jiu)
—	DF	ROU	Srdjan Luchin (from CFR Cluj)
—	MF	ROU	Vlad Achim (from FCSB, previously on loan at Botoșani)
—	MF	ROU	Andrei Artean (from ACS Poli Timișoara)
—	MF	ROU	Eduard Florescu (from Mioveni)
—	MF	FRA	Lyes Houri (from (France) Lens B)
—	MF	RUS	Amir Natkho (from (Russia) Lokomotiv Moscow)
—	FW	ROU	Robert Răducanu (from Concordia Chiajna, previously on loan)
—	FW	ROU	Cătălin Țîră (from Energeticianul)
—	DF	ROU	Constantin Dima (from FC Dinamo București)
—	MF	ROU	Andrei Tîrcoveanu (from Dinamo București)
—	DF	NED	Bas Kuipers (from (Netherlands) Ado Den Haag)
—	MF	BRA	Eric Pereira (from (Qatar) Al-Markhiya SC)
—	FW	BRA	Rivaldinho (on loan from (Bulgaria) Levski Sofia)
—	MF	ROU	Andreas Calcan (from (Netherlands) Almere City)
—	MF	ROU	Tudor Băluță (on loan from (England) Brighton & Hove Albion, previously signed)
—	GK	ROU	Árpád Tordai (loan return from Petrolul Ploiești)
—	FW	ROU	George Ganea (from CFR Cluj)

Out:

No.	Pos.	Nation	Player
—	GK	MDA	Sebastian Agachi (on loan to Pucioasa)
—	GK	ROU	Cosmin Dur-Bozoancă (on loan to Universitatea Cluj, previously on loan at ASU Politehnica Timișoara)
—	GK	ROU	Ionuț Gurău (on loan to Gloria Buzău, previously on loan at Farul Constanța)
—	GK	ROU	Rareș Micu (on loan to Medgidia)
—	GK	ROU	Haralambie Mociu (on loan to Medgidia)
—	GK	ROU	Rareș Murariu (on loan to ASU Politehnica Timișoara)
—	GK	ROU	Mihai Popa (to Farul Constanța)
—	GK	ROU	Árpád Tordai (on loan to Petrolul Ploiești)
—	DF	ROU	Paul Acasandrei (on loan to Axiopolis Cernavodă)
—	DF	ROU	Mădălin Androne (on loan to Gloria Buzău, previously on loan at Farul Constanța)
—	DF	ROU	Tiberiu Căpușă (on loan to Universitatea Cluj)
—	DF	ROU	Cristian Ganea (to (Spain) Athletic Bilbao)
—	DF	ROU	Darius Grosu (on loan to Afumați)
—	DF	ROU	Robert Hodorogea (on loan to Voluntari)
—	DF	ROU	Răzvan Horj (to (Hungary) Újpest, previously on loan at Voluntari)
—	DF	ROU	Szabolcs Kilyen (on loan to Mioveni, previously on loan at Miercurea Ciuc)
—	DF	ROU	Cosmin Piciu (to Sporting Roșiori, previously on loan at Metalul Buzău)
—	DF	ROU	Răzvan Prodan (on loan to Farul Constanța)
—	DF	ROU	Sorin Rădoi (Retired)
—	DF	ROU	Andrei Rusu (on loan to Medgidia)
—	DF	ROU	Alexandru Sabangeanu (on loan to Farul Constanța)
—	DF	ROU	Nicholas Suflaru (on loan to Medgidia)
—	MF	ROU	Alexandru Cicâldău (to CS U Craiova)
—	MF	ROU	Antonio Cruceru (to Petrolul Ploiești)
—	MF	ROU	Doru Dumitrescu (on loan to Universitatea Cluj)
—	MF	ROU	Mihai Ene (on loan to Petrolul Ploiești)
—	MF	ROU	Eduard Florescu (to Botoșani, previously signed from Mioveni)
—	MF	ROU	Giani Gherghiceanu (on loan to Alexandria)
—	MF	ROU	Robert Grecu (on loan to Petrolul Ploiești, previously on loan at Argeș Pitești)
—	MF	ROU	Florin Nicolescu (to Free agent, previously on loan at Afumați)
—	MF	ROU	Rareș Oană (on loan to Sporting Liești)
—	MF	GHA	Kofi Twumasi (to Universitatea Cluj)
—	MF	ROU	Raul Vidrășan (on loan to ASU Politehnica Timișoara)
—	FW	ROU	Romeo Bănică (on loan to ASU Politehnica Timișoara)
—	FW	ROU	Cristian Ene (to Universitatea Cluj)
—	FW	ROU	Cristian Gavra (to Universitatea Cluj)
—	FW	ROU	Mircea Manole (to Rapid București, previously on loan at Afumați)
—	FW	ROU	Cezar Mihalache (on loan to Argeș Pitești, previously on loan at Chindia Târgoviște)
—	FW	ROU	Cătălin Țîră (to Luceafărul Oradea, previously signed from Energeticianul)
—	DF	ROU	Robert Băjan (to Rapid București)
—	DF	ROU	Constantin Dima (to Astra Giurgiu)
—	DF	ROU	Srdjan Luchin (to Dunărea Călărași)
—	DF	ROU	Răzvan Prodan (on loan to Daco-Getica București, previously on loan at Farul Constanța)
—	FW	ROU	Robert Răducanu (to FC U Craiova)
—	FW	ROU	Alexandru Stoica (on loan to Petrolul Ploiești)
—	MF	ROU	Robert Grecu (on loan to Daco-Getica București, previously on loan at Petrolul Ploiești)
—	MF	ROU	Mihai Ene (on loan to ASU Politehnica Timișoara, previously on loan at Petrolul Ploiești)
—	FW	ROU	Mihai Voduț (to (Israel) Beitar Jerusalem)
—	DF	ROU	Dan Panait (on loan to Chindia Târgoviște, previously on loan at Concordia Chiajna)
—	FW	ROU	Cristian Ene (on loan to ASU Politehnica Timișoara, previously on loan at Universitatea Cluj)
—	DF	ROU	Robert Neciu (on loan to Farul Constanța)
—	MF	CPV	Mailson Lima (to Ararat-Armenia)
—	MF	ROU	Vlad Chera (on loan to Ripensia Timișoara)
—	MF	RUS	Amir Natkho (to (Belarus) FC BATE Borisov)

== Preseason and friendlies ==
Win Draw Loss

20 June 2018	Viitorul Constanța (Romania)	5–0	(Moldova) FC Zimbru Chisinau	Ovidiu, Romania
EEST (UTC+3)	Stoica 38'; Florescu 51'; Houri 57'; Chera 78'; Pitu 90'			Stadium: Viitorul

24 June 2018	Viitorul Constanța (Romania)	7–0	(Poland) Daleszyce Spartacus	Kielce, Poland
EEST (UTC+3)	Cicâldău 23'; Vînă 30'; Ciobanu 55'; Florescu 58'; Iacob 67'; Țîră 80'; Țîră 83'

27 June 2018	Viitorul Constanța (Romania)	2–0	(Poland) Znicz Pruszków	Kielce, Poland
	Țîră 12'; Cicâldău 82'

27 June 2018	Viitorul Constanța (Romania)	0–4	(Poland) Zagłębie Sosnowiec	Kielce, Poland
EEST (UTC+3)			Udovičić 54'; Junior Torunarigha 69'; Pawlik 90'; Milewski 91'

30 June 2018	Viitorul Constanța (Romania)	2–1	(Poland) Jagiellonia Białystok	Kielce, Poland
	Hagi 59'; Drăguș 67'		Runje 11'

30 June 2018	Viitorul Constanța (Romania)	3–2	(Poland) Podbeskidzie Bielsko-Biała	Kielce, Poland
EEST (UTC+3)	Iacob 4'; Houri 29'; 83' (o.g.)		Sabala 27'; Rakowski 57'

4 July 2018	Legia Warsaw (Poland)	5–2	(Romania) Viitorul Constanța	Warsaw, Poland
20:00 CEST (UTC+2)	Kucharczyk 25'; Cafú 34'; Kanté 44'; Kanté 53'; Kucharczyk 67'		Hagi 21'; Voduţ 90'	Stadium: Polish Army Stadium; Attendance: 3,000; Referee: Tomasz Kwiatkowski (Warsaw)

5 July 2018	Viitorul Constanța (Romania)	3–1	(Poland) Radomiak Radom	Warka, Poland
EEST (UTC+3)	Houri 14'; Iacob 40'; Neciu 47'		? (?)

8 September 2018	Dunărea Călărași (Romania)	2–1	(Romania) Viitorul Constanța	Călărași, Romania
EET (UTC+2)			Iacob 50'	Stadium: Ion Comșa

13 October 2018	Viitorul Constanța (Romania)	1–0	(Romania) Dunărea Călărași	Ovidiu, Romania
EEST (UTC+3)	Vînă 57'			Stadium: Viitorul

15 November 2018	Ludogorets Razgrad (Bulgaria)	0–2	(Romania) Viitorul Constanța	Razgrad, Bulgaria
EET (UTC+2)			Voduț 29'; Artean 67'	Stadium: Ludogorets Arena

14 January 2019	Viitorul Constanța (Romania)	2–1	(Hungary) Ferencvárosi TC	Belek, Turkey
	Voduț 16'; Pitu 71'		Lanzafame 64'	Stadium: Rixos Belek

17 January 2019	Viitorul Constanța (Romania)	2–2	(Russia) FC Rubin Kazan	Belek, Turkey
	Hagi 46'; Vînă 63'		Davitashvili 43'; Reza Shekari 67'	Stadium: Belis Belek

17 January 2019	Viitorul Constanța (Romania)	0–5	(Germany) VfR Aalen	Belek, Turkey
			Sessa; Morys; Morys; Fennel; Trianni	Stadium: Sueno Belek

21 January 2019	Viitorul Constanța (Romania)	0–1	(Denmark) Vejle Boldklub	Belek, Turkey
			Sousa 65'	Stadium: Sueno Belek

24 January 2019	Viitorul Constanța (Romania)	0–3	(Russia) Yenisey Krasnoyarsk	Belek, Turkey
			Gadzhibekov 15'; Sarkisov 37' 45'	Stadium: Sueno Belek

24 January 2019	Viitorul Constanța (Romania)	1–2	(Georgia (country)) FC Saburtalo Tbilisi	Belek, Turkey
	Marius Leca 43'		Gega Diasamidze 45+3'; Grigol Chabradze 81'	Stadium: Sueno Belek

16 February 2019	Viitorul Constanța (Romania)	4–0	(Romania) Axiopolis Cernavodă	Ovidiu, Romania
EEST (UTC+3)	Paul Iacob 6'; Mățan 17'; Dimciu Halep 85'; Pitu 88'			Stadium: Complexul Academiei Hagi

23 March 2019	Viitorul Constanța (Romania)	3–0	(Moldova) FC Zimbru Chisinau	Ovidiu, Romania
EEST (UTC+3)	Ganea 18'; Eric 33' 58'			Stadium: Viitorul; Referee: Antonio Pascu

== Competitions ==
Win Draw Loss

=== Liga I ===
The Liga I fixture list was announced on 5 July 2018.

==== Regular season ====
===== Table =====
Pos	Team	Pld	W	D	L	GF	GA	GD	Pts	Qualification
3	Universitatea Craiova	26	13	6	7	43	24	+19	45	Qualification for the Championship round
4	Astra Giurgiu	26	11	9	6	36	23	+13	42	Qualification for the Championship round
5	Viitorul Constanța	26	11	5	10	26	27	−1	38	Qualification for the Championship round
6	Sepsi OSK	26	10	7	9	32	25	+7	37	Qualification for the Championship round
7	Botoșani	26	9	9	8	31	33	−2	36	Qualification for the Relegation round

Source: LPF (in Romanian), Soccerway
Rules for classification: 1) Points; 2) Head-to-head points; 3) Head-to-head goal difference; 4) Head-to-head goals scored; 5) Goal difference; 6) Goals scored; 7) Play-off.

===== Matches =====
Win Draw Loss

21 July 2018 1	Viitorul Constanța	0–1	Dunărea Călărași	Ovidiu
EEST (UTC+3)			Honciu 5'	Stadium: Viitorul

28 July 2018 2	Concordia Chiajna	1–1	Viitorul Constanța	Chiajna
EEST (UTC+3)	Marc 32'		Houri 89'	Stadium: Concordia

4 August 2018 3	Viitorul Constanta	0–2	Fc Voluntari	Ovidiu
EEST (UTC+3)	Vînă 69' (pen.); Drăguș 79'			Stadium: Viitorul

11 August 2018 4	Dinamo București	1–0	Viitorul Constanța	Bucharest
EEST (UTC+3)	Mahlangu 37'			Stadium: Dinamo

18 August 2018 5	Viitorul Constanța	2–0	Gaz Metan Mediaș	Ovidiu
EEST (UTC+3)	Drăguș 29'; Ciobanu 85'			Stadium: Viitorul

26 August 2018 6	Viitorul Constanța	1–4	FCSB	Ovidiu
21:00 EEST (UTC+03)	Ghiță (red card) 5'; Mățan (yellow card) 14'; Vînă 71'; Houri (yellow card) 86'		Filip (yellow card) 8'; Coman 45'; Nedelcu (yellow card) 45+4'; Man 52'; Popescu (yellow card) 69'; Qaka (yellow card) 78'; Júnior Morais (yellow card) 78'; D. Benzar 82'; Rusescu 89'	Stadium: Viitorul; Attendance: 4,500; Referee: István Kovács; Assistant referees: Vasile Marinescu, Ovidiu Artene; Fourth official: Florin Andrei

1 September 2018 7	CFR Cluj	1–2	Viitorul Constanța	Cluj-Napoca
EEST (UTC+3)	Țucudean 55'		Voduț 86'; Hagi 90' (pen.)	Stadium: Dr. Constantin Rădulescu

15 September 2018 8	Viitorul Constanța	1–0	Hermannstadt Sibiu	Ovidiu
EEST (UTC+3)	Hagi 29' (pen.)			Stadium: Viitorul

22 September 2018 9	Universitatea Craiova	2–0	Viitorul Constanța	Craiova
EEST (UTC+3)	Koljić 5' 48'			Stadium: Ion Oblemenco

29 September 2018 10	Viitorul Constanța	1–0	Astra Giurgiu	Ovidiu
EEST (UTC+3)	Băluță 90'			Stadium: Viitorul

6 October 2018 11	Politehnica Iași	1–2	Viitorul Constanța	Iași
EEST (UTC+3)	Cristea 42' (pen.)		Hagi 20'; Hagi 45' (pen.)	Stadium: Emil Alexandrescu

20 October 2018 12	Viitorul Constanța	2–3	Sepsi Sfântu Gheorghe	Ovidiu
EEST (UTC+3)	Luchin 13'; Băluță 82'		Jovanović 7'; Mensah 66'; Tandia 86'	Stadium: Viitorul

27 October 2018 13	Botoșani	1–2	Viitorul Constanța	Botoșani
EEST (UTC+3)	Trujić 90'		Voduț 67'; Hagi 86' (pen.)	Stadium: Municipal

3 November 2018 14	Dunărea Călărași	0–1	Viitorul Constanța	Călărași
EET (UTC+2)			Drăguș 88'	Stadium: Ion Comșa

10 November 2018 15	Viitorul Constanța	0–0	Concordia Chiajna	Ovidiu
EET (UTC+2)				Stadium: Viitorul

25 November 2018 16	Voluntari	1–2	Viitorul Constanța	Voluntari
EET (UTC+2)	Tudorie 66'		Mladen 21'; Ghiță 84'	Stadium: Anghel Iordănescu

2 December 2018 17	Viitorul Constanța	4–1	Dinamo București	Ovidiu
EET (UTC+2)	Drăguș 4'; Hagi 37' 90'; Achim 77'		Montini 13'	Stadium: Viitorul

5 December 2018 18	Gaz Metan Mediaș	2–2	Viitorul Constanța	Mediaș
EET (UTC+2)	Luchin 25' (o.g.); Yazalde 89'		Drăguș 32'; Houri 74'	Stadium: Gaz Metan

10 December 2018 19	FCSB	2–0	Viitorul Constanța	Pitești
20:00 EEST (UTC+02)	Nedelcu (yellow card) 19'; Tănase 41', (yellow card) 55'; Filip 76'; Júnior Morais (yellow card) 80'		Achim (yellow card) 46'; Ghiță (yellow card) 70'	Stadium: Nicolae Dobrin; Attendance: 5,000; Referee: Marius Avram; Assistant referees: Mircea Mihail Grigoriu, Marius Nicoară; Fourth official: Andrei Florin Chivulete

15 December 2018 20	Viitorul Constanța	0–1	CFR Cluj	Ovidiu
EET (UTC+2)			Țucudean 33'	Stadium: Viitorul

20 December 2018 21	Hermannstadt Sibiu	1–0	Viitorul Constanța	Cluj
EET (UTC+2)	Dumitru 12'			Stadium: Dr. Constantin Rădulescu

2 February 2019 22	Viitorul Constanța	0–0	Universitatea Craiova	Ovidiu
EET (UTC+2)				Stadium: Viitorul

9 February 2019 23	Astra Giurgiu	3–0	Viitorul Constanța	Giurgiu
EET (UTC+2)	Zoua 28'; *Alibec 51' 65'			Stadium: Marin Anastasovici

16 February 2019 24	Viitorul Constanța	0–1	Politehnica Iași	Ovidiu
EET (UTC+2)			Boris Garrós 85'	Stadium: Viitorul

23 February 2019 25	Sepsi Sfântu Gheorghe	0–0	Viitorul Constanța	Sfântu Gheorghe
EET (UTC+2)				Stadium: Municipal

3 March 2019 26	Viitorul Constanța	1–0	Botoșani	Ovidiu
EET (UTC+2)	Houri 26'			Stadium: Viitorul

==== Championship round ====
===== Table =====
Pos	Team	Pld	W	D	L	GF	GA	GD	Pts	Qualification
1	CFR Cluj (C)	10	7	2	1	15	4	+11	50	Qualification to Champions League first qualifying round
2	FCSB	10	7	2	1	18	6	+12	48	Qualification to Europa League first qualifying round
3	Viitorul Constanța	10	6	2	2	18	10	+8	39	Qualification to Europa League second qualifying round
4	Universitatea Craiova	10	4	1	5	8	10	−2	36	Qualification to Europa League first qualifying round
5	Astra Giurgiu	10	2	0	8	6	20	−14	27	
6	Sepsi OSK	10	0	1	9	5	20	−15	20	

Source: Soccerway, Romanian Football Federation
Rules for classification: 1) Points; 2) Points without rounding; 3) Head-to-head points; 4) Head-to-head goal difference; 5) Head-to-head goals scored; 6) Goal difference; 7) Goals scored; 8) Play-off (only if needed to decide champion or teams for UEFA competitions). (Note: only criteria 6 and 7 are applied to establish the classification during the competition.)
(C) Champions

===== Position by round =====
Round	1	2	3	4	5	6	7	8	9	10
Ground	A	H	A	A	H	H	A	H	H	A
Result	W	L	D	W	W	D	L	W	W	W
Position	4	4	4	4	4	4	4	4	3	3

Source: Liga I
A = Away; H = Home; W = Win; D = Draw; L = Loss

===== Matches =====
Win Draw Loss

11 March 2019 1	FCSB	1–2	Viitorul Constanța	Bucharest
20:30 EEST (UTC+02)	Bălașa (yellow card) 17'; Coman 40'; Filip (yellow card) 50'; Benzar (yellow card) 64'; Coman (yellow card) 76'		Calcan 15'; Mladen (yellow card) 30'; Hagi 65' (pen.); Artean (yellow card) 88'; Vînă (yellow card) 88'	Stadium: Arena Națională; Attendance: 8,783; Referee: Radu Petrescu; Assistant referees: Alexandru Cerei, Ciprian Florin Danşa; Fourth official: Marian Barbu

15 March 2019 2	Viitorul Constanța	0–1	CFR Cluj	Ovidiu
			Alexandru Păun 73'	Stadium: Viitorul

29 March 2019 3	Sepsi Sfântu Gheorghe	0–0	Viitorul Constanța	Sfântu Gheorghe
				Stadium: Municipal

5 April 2019 4	Astra Giurgiu	1–4	Viitorul Constanța	Giurgiu
	Alibec 34'		Ganea 21' 70' Casap 28' Eric 60'	Stadium: Marin Anastasovici

12 April 2019 5	Viitorul Constanța	2–1	Universitatea Craiova	Ovidiu
	Hagi 43' Rivaldinho 56'		Bărbuț 9'	Stadium: Viitorul

21 April 2019 6	Viitorul Constanța	1–1	FCSB	Ovidiu
	Țîru (yellow card) 44'; Achim (yellow card) 73' (yellow-red card) 74'; Hagi 80'	Summary	Benzar (yellow card) 26' (yellow-red card) 61'; Gnohéré 68'	Stadium: Viitorul; Attendance: 4,500; Referee: Marius Avram

29 April 2019 7	CFR Cluj	3–1	Viitorul Constanța	Cluj-Napoca
	Camora 57'; Culio 68' (pen.); Vinícius 75'		Rivaldinho 14'	Stadium: Dr. Constantin Rădulescu; Referee: Sebastian Colțescu (Craiova), Ovidiu Artene (Vaslui) și Adrian Popescu (Craiova)

3 May 2019 8	Viitorul Constanța	3–1	Sepsi Sfântu Gheorghe	Ovidiu
	Calcan 51' 68'; Eric * 75'		Hamed 49'	Stadium: Viitorul; Referee: Marian Barbu (Făgăraș-Brașov), Daniel Mitruți (Craiova-Dolj), Alexandru Vodă (Alba Iulia-Alba)

10 May 2019 9	Viitorul Constanța	3–0	Astra Giurgiu	Ovidiu
	Eric 44' (pen.); Calcan 66'; Drăguș 73'			Stadium: Viitorul; Referee: Andrei Antonie (București), George Neacșu (Câmpulung Muscel – Argeș), Marius Marchidanu (Brăila)

18 May 2019 10	Universitatea Craiova	1–2	Viitorul Constanța	Craiova
	Martić 15'		Valentin Mihăilă 70'; Drăguș 90'	Stadium: Ion Oblemenco

=== Cupa României ===
==== Round of 32 ====
26 September 2018	Concordia Chiajna	0–3	Viitorul Constanța	Chiajna
			Ghiță 14' Leca* 65' (o.g.) Ciobanu 90'	Stadium: Concordia

==== Round of 16 ====
30 October 2018	Politehnica Iași	2–2 (3–5 p)	Viitorul Constanța	Iași
EEST (UTC+3)	Sanoh 55'; Frăsinescu 75'		Hagi 15' (pen.); Mățan 39'	Stadium: Emil Alexandrescu
	Penalties
	Platini (penalty scored); Qaka (penalty scored); Bădic (penalty scored); N'Dongala (penalty missed)		I.Hagi (penalty scored); A.Ciobanu (penalty scored); V.Achim (penalty scored); Casap (penalty scored); Houri (penalty scored)

==== Quarter-finals ====
26 February 2019	Hermannstadt Sibiu	2–3	Viitorul Constanța	Pitești
EET (UTC+2)	Achim 63' (o.g.); *Juvhel Tsoumou 72'		Achim 6' (pen.); Rivaldinho 42'; Eric 78'	Stadium: Nicolae Dobrin

==== Semi-finals ====
4 April 2019 1	Universitatea Craiova	1–2	Viitorul Constanța	Craiova
EEST (UTC+3)	Bancu 5'		Houri 77'; Rivaldinho 89'	Stadium: Ion Oblemenco; Attendance: 8,000; Referee: Horațiu Feșnic (Cluj-Napoca)

25 April 2019 2	Viitorul Constanța	2–0 (4–1 agg.)	Universitatea Craiova	Ovidiu
19:45 EET (UTC+2)	Hagi 6' 86'; Boboc (yellow card) 30'	Summary	Cicâldău (yellow card) 7'; Bărbuț (yellow card) 57'; Carlos Fortes (yellow card) 66'; Bancu (yellow card) 90'	Stadium: Viitorul; Attendance: 4,000; Referee: Radu Pettrescu

==== Final ====
25 May 2019 Final	Astra Giurgiu	1–2	Viitorul Constanța	Ploiești
	Alibec 41'		Ghiță 76'; Eric 105+2'	Stadium: Ilie Oană; Attendance: 11,968; Referee: Radu Petrescu (Bucharest)

=== UEFA Europa League ===
After finishing fourth in the 2017-18 Liga I, Viitorul Constanța entered the Europa League at the first qualifying round.

==== First qualifying round ====
12 July 2018 1st Leg	Racing FC (Luxembourg)	0–2	(Romania) Viitorul Constanța	Stade Josy Barthel, Luxembourg City (Note: Racing FC played their home matches at Stade Josy Barthel, Luxembourg City, instead of their regular stadium Stade Achille Hammerel, Luxembourg City.)
20:00		Report	Drăguș 23'; Hagi 82' (pen.)	Attendance: 1,383

19 July 2018 2nd Leg	Viitorul Constanța (Romania)	0–0 (2–0 agg.)	(Luxembourg) Racing FC	Stadionul Viitorul, Ovidiu
17:00 (18:00 EEST)		Report

===== Second qualifying round =====
21 July 2018 1st Leg	Viitorul Constanța (Romania)	2–2	(Netherlands) Vitesse	Stadionul Viitorul, Ovidiu
17:00 (18:00 EEST)	Drăguș 44', 49'; Artean (red card) 79'	Report	Foor (yellow card) 37'; Matavž 54'; Linssen 72'	Referee: Davide Massa (Italy)

21 August 2018 2nd Leg	Vitesse (Netherlands)	3–1 (5–3 agg.)	(Romania) Viitorul Constanța	GelreDome, Arnhem
17:00 (21:00 EEST)	Matavž 23'; Büttner (yellow card) 41'; Linssen 48'; Beerens 77', (yellow card) 87'	Report	De Nooijer (yellow card) 18'; Houri (yellow card) 39'; Drăguș 50'	Referee: Kevin Clancy (Scotland)

== Statistics ==
=== Goalscorers ===
Rank	Position	Name	Liga I	Cupa României	Europa League	Total
1	MF	(Romania) Ianis Hagi	10	3	1	14
2	FW	(Romania) Denis Drăguș	7	0	4	11
3	MF	(Brazil) Eric	3	2	0	5
3	FW	(France) Lyes Houri	3	1	0	4
3	FW	(Brazil) Rivaldinho	2	2	0	4
3	MF	(Romania) Andreas Calcan	4	0	0	4
3	DF	(Romania) Virgil Ghiță	1	2	0	3
4	MF	(Romania) Ionuț Vînă	2	0	0	2
4	MF	(Romania) Tudor Băluță	2	0	0	2
4	FW	(Romania) Mihai Voduț	2	0	0	2
4	MF	(Romania) Andrei Ciobanu	1	1	0	2
4	MF	(Romania) Vlad Achim	1	1	0	2
4	FW	(Romania) George Ganea	2	0	0	2
5	MF	(Romania) Srdjan Luchin	1	0	0	1
5	MF	(Romania) Sebastian Mladen	1	0	0	1
5	MF	(Romania) Carlo Casap	1	0	0	1
5	MF	(Romania) Alexandru Mățan	0	1	0	1

=== Clean sheets ===
As of 2019

Rank	Name	Liga I	Cupa României	Europa League	Total
1	(Romania) Valentin Cojocaru	7	2	2	11
2	(Romania) (Hungary) Árpád Tordai	2	0	0	2
3	(Romania) Alexandru Buzbuchi	1	0	0	1
Total		10	2	2	14

=== Disciplinary record ===
As of 2019

- Most yellow cards:

(Romania) Sebastian Mladen(11 cards)

- Most red cards:

(Romania) Tudor Băluță(2 cards)

== UEFA Club rankings ==
Rank	Team	Points	Mvmnt
252	(Norway) Stabæk Fotball	4.040	▲
253	(Norway) Tromsø IL	4.040	▲
254	(Romania) FC Viitorul Constanța	4.000	▼
255	(Luxembourg) CS Fola Esch	4.000	▼
256	(Faroe Islands) Víkingur	4.000	▼
257	(Liechtenstein) FC Vaduz	4.000	▼
258	(Andorra) FC Santa Coloma	4.000	▼
259	(Poland) Jagiellonia Białystok	3.350	▼

== See also ==
- 2018–19 Cupa României
- 2018–19 Liga I
- 2018–19 UEFA Europa League
