= Tudor Băluță =

Romanian footballer

- Băluță with Universitatea Craiova in 2025

Personal information
- Full name: Tudor Cristian Băluță
- Date of birth: 27 March 1999 (age 27)
- Place of birth: Craiova, Romania
- Height: 1.91 m (6 ft 3 in)
- Positions: Defensive midfielder; centre-back

Team information
- Current team: Universitatea Craiova
- Number: 8

Youth career
- 2007–2013: Școala de Fotbal Gheorghe Popescu
- 2013–2015: Gheorghe Hagi Academy

Senior career*
Years	Team	Apps	(Gls)
2015–2019	Viitorul Constanța	42	(2)
2019–2022	Brighton & Hove Albion	0	(0)
2019	→ Viitorul Constanța (loan)	11	(0)
2020	→ ADO Den Haag (loan)	4	(0)
2020–2021	→ Dynamo Kyiv (loan)	1	(0)
2022–2024	Farul Constanța	44	(7)
2024–2025	Śląsk Wrocław	25	(0)
2025–	Universitatea Craiova	43	(1)

International career^{‡}
2017–2018	Romania U19	6	(3)
2019–2020	Romania U21	8	(2)
2021	Romania Olympic	2	(0)
2018–	Romania	17	(0)
- * Club domestic league appearances and goals as of 8 November 2026 ‡ National team caps and goals as of 14 November 2026

Tudor Cristian Băluță (Romanian pronunciation: [ˈtudor kristiˈan bəˈlut͡sə]; born 27 March 1999) is a Romanian professional footballer who plays as a defensive midfielder or a centre-back for Liga I club Universitatea Craiova and the Romania national team.

== Club career ==
=== Viitorul Constanța ===
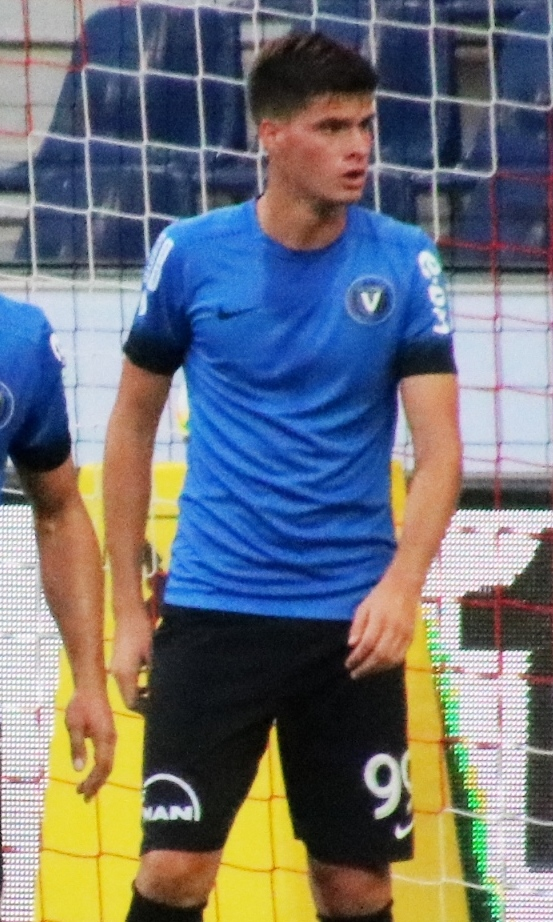
Băluță playing against Red Bull Salzburg in the UEFA Europa League, 24 August 2017.

Băluță began his career in native Craiova, joining the Gheorghe Popescu Football School at age 8. Six years later, he moved to Viitorul Constanța's academy. Băluță made his professional debut in the Liga I on 2 May 2016, aged 17, replacing Ianis Hagi in the 54th minute of a 6–1 thrashing of ASA Târgu Mureș.

He did not feature in any senior games in the next season as Viitorul won the first league title in its history, but started appearing frequently for the side since the summer of 2017. On 24 August that year, Băluță recorded his European debut in a UEFA Europa League play-off round 0–4 loss to Red Bull Salzburg. On 30 August 2018, he scored his first goal—and the only of the match—in a league win over Astra Giurgiu.

=== Brighton & Hove Albion ===
Băluță agreed to a three-and-a-half-year contract with English club Brighton & Hove Albion on 31 January 2019. Băluță was immediately loaned back to Viitorul Constanța for the remainder of the campaign. Press reported the transfer fee at €3 million, which made him the club's most expensive sale at the time, tied with Florinel Coman.

On 25 May, he was a starter and played the full match in the Cupa României final 2–1 success against Astra Giurgiu.

Returning to Brighton during pre-season following the expiration of his loan, Băluță made the bench for the first time for "the Seagulls" in a 2–1 away win over Bristol Rovers in the EFL Cup on 27 August 2019 and was named on the bench in a Premier League fixture for the first time in a 1–1 home draw against Burnley on 14 September. He remained an unused substitute in both fixtures. Băluță made his debut for the Sussex club in the EFL Cup playing the whole match in the 3–1 home defeat to Aston Villa on 25 September.

==== Loan to ADO Den Haag ====
On 17 January 2020 it was confirmed that Băluță had joined ADO Den Haag on loan until the end of the season. He made his debut for the Eredivisie side a week later playing the full match in a 4–0 away loss at FC Utrecht. Băluță made 4 appearances for The Hague based side with his time at the club cut short due to the Dutch FA taking the decision to cancel the season due to COVID-19.

==== Loan to Dynamo Kyiv ====
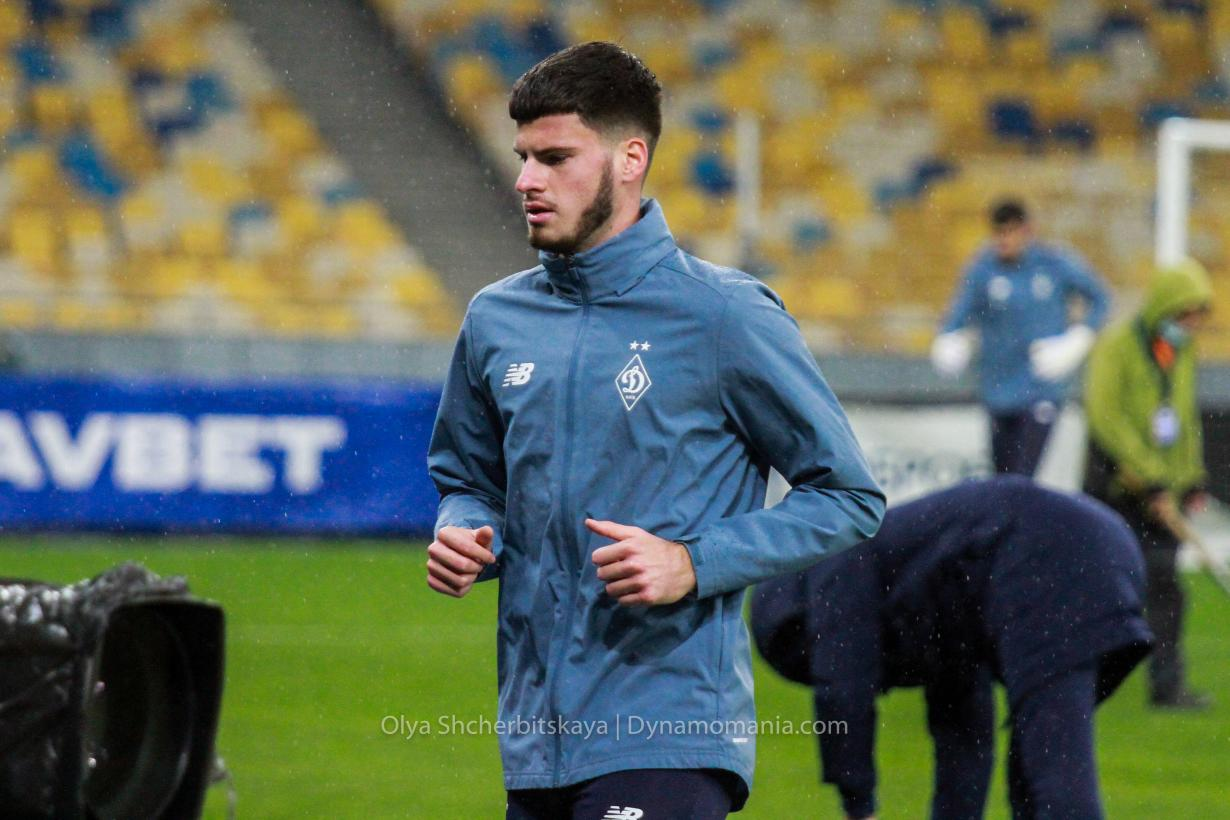
Băluță warming up for Dynamo Kyiv in 2020

On 4 October 2020 the loan of Băluță to Dynamo Kyiv was confirmed by the president of the club Ihor Surkis in his interview. He made his debut for Kiev in what was also his first Champions League appearance coming on as a substitute in a 2–2 away draw against Hungarian side Ferencváros on 28 October. Băluță made his Ukrainian Premier League debut coming on as a substitute in a 2–0 away victory against Inhulets on 21 November.

=== Farul Constanța ===
On 12 July 2022, Băluță signed a two-year contract with Liga I team Farul Constanța.

=== Śląsk Wrocław ===
On 19 July 2024, Ekstraklasa club Śląsk Wrocław announced the signing of Băluță on a two-year deal, with an option for a further year.

=== Universitatea Craiova ===
On 18 June 2025, Băluță was transferred to Liga I club Universitatea Craiova on a two-year contract for no initial fee, with Śląsk potentially receiving add-ons based on Băluță's performances.

== International career ==
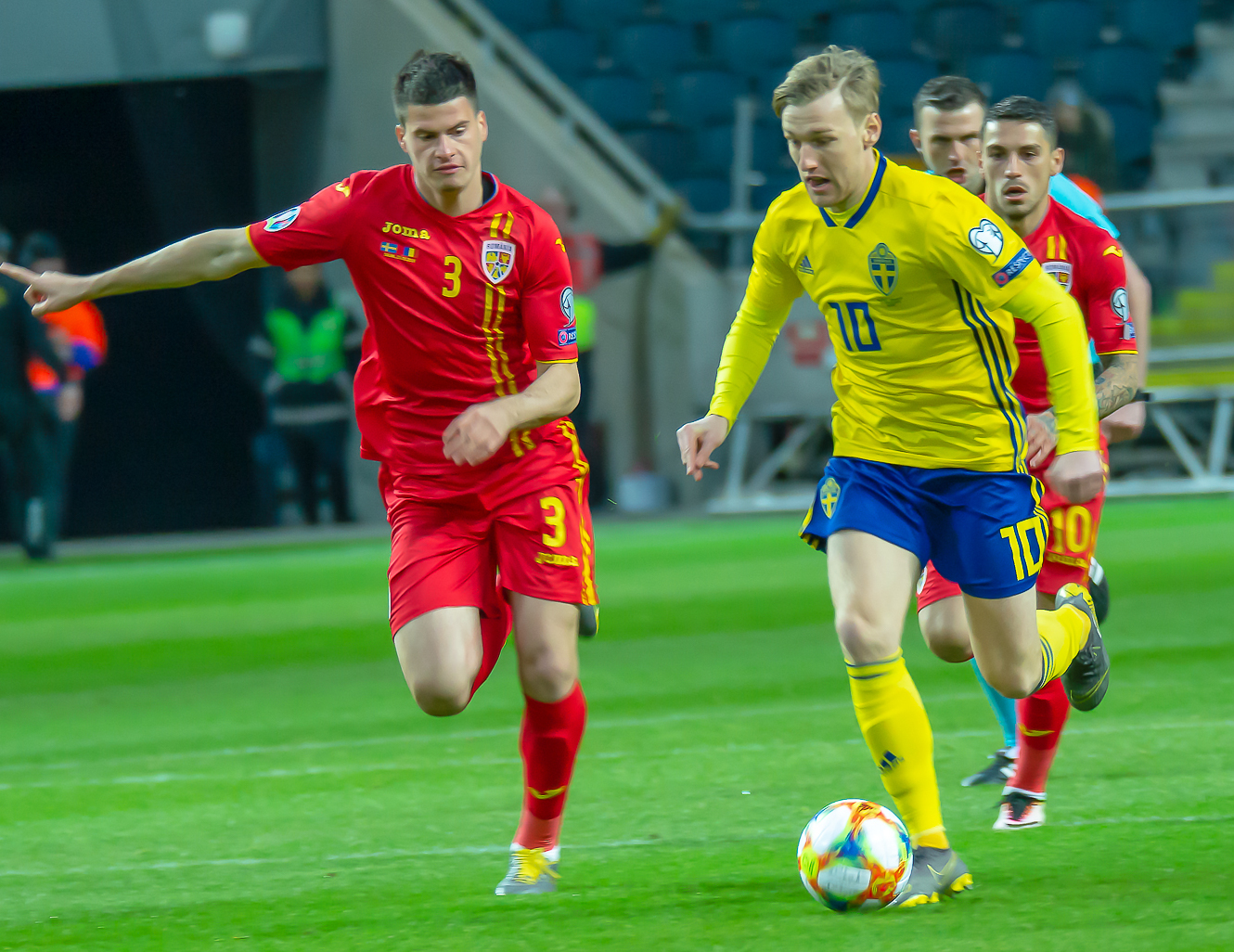
Băluță (left, in red) during a UEFA Euro 2020 qualifying match against Sweden, March 2019

Băluță earned his first senior cap for Romania on 31 May 2018, coming on as a 71st-minute substitute for his former Viitorul Constanța teammate Dragoș Nedelcu in a 3–2 friendly victory over Chile.

Despite not playing in the qualifiers, Băluță was selected in Romania's squad for the 2019 UEFA European Under-21 Championship in Italy. Băluță scored on debut against Croatia on 19 June, which ended in a 4–1 win for his side. He recorded three more games as Tricolorii mici were eliminated by Germany in the semi-finals, following a 2–4 defeat.

== Style of play ==
Băluță is primarily deployed as a defensive midfielder, but started out as a centre-back. He has been likened to former Romanian international and Barcelona captain Gheorghe Popescu, also a native of Dolj County, who in his turn described Băluță as an "intelligent player" with "exceptional qualities".

== Career statistics ==
=== Club ===
As of match played 8 November 2026

Appearances and goals by club, season and competition
Club	Season	League			National cup (Note: Includes Cupa României, Polish Cup)		Continental		Other		Total	
Club	Season	Division	Apps	Goals	Apps	Goals	Apps	Goals	Apps	Goals	Apps	Goals
Viitorul Constanța	2015–16	Liga I	2	0	0	0	—		0	0	2	0
Viitorul Constanța	2017–18	Liga I	24	0	1	0	1 (Note: Appearances in UEFA Europa League)	0	—		26	0
Viitorul Constanța	2018–19	Liga I	27	2	3	0	4	0	—		34	2
Viitorul Constanța	Total		53	2	4	0	5	0	—		62	2
Brighton & Hove Albion	2019–20	Premier League	0	0	0	0	—		1 (Note: Appearances in EFL Cup)	0	1	0
ADO den Haag (loan)	2019–20	Eredivisie	4	0	0	0	—		—		4	0
Dynamo Kyiv (loan)	2020–21	Ukrainian Premier League	1	0	0	0	2 (Note: Appearances in UEFA Champions League)	0	—		3	0
Farul Constanța	2022–23	Liga I	32	6	0	0	—		—		32	6
Farul Constanța	2023–24	Liga I	12	1	0	0	8 (Note: Two appearances in UEFA Champions League, six appearances in UEFA Conference League)	1	0	0	20	2
Farul Constanța	Total		44	7	0	0	8	1	0	0	52	8
Śląsk Wrocław	2024–25	Ekstraklasa	25	0	1	0	0	0	—		26	0
Universitatea Craiova	2025–26	Liga I	31	1	4	0	10 (Note: Appearances in UEFA Conference League)	1	—		45	2
Universitatea Craiova	2026–27	Liga I	12	0	2	0	11 (Note: Four appearances in UEFA Champions League, four appearances in UEFA Europa League, three appearances in UEFA Conference League)	0	1 (Note: Appearance in Supercupa României)	0	26	0
Universitatea Craiova	Total		43	1	6	0	21	1	1	0	71	2
Career Total			170	10	11	0	36	2	2	0	219	12

=== International ===
As of match played 14 November 2026

Appearances and goals by national team and year
National team	Year	Apps	Goals
Romania	2018	3	0
Romania	2019	4	0
Romania	2022	2	0
Romania	2023	3	0
Romania	2026	5	0
Total		17	0

== Honours ==
Viitorul Constanța

- Liga I: 2016–17
- Cupa României: 2018–19
- Supercupa României runner-up: 2017

Dynamo Kyiv

- Ukrainian Premier League: 2020–21
- Ukrainian Cup: 2020–21

Farul Constanța

- Liga I: 2022–23
- Supercupa României runner-up: 2023

Śląsk Wrocław II

- III liga, group III: 2024–25

Universitatea Craiova

- Liga I: 2025–26
- Cupa României: 2025–26
- Supercupa României: 2026

Individual

- Gazeta Sporturilor Romania Player of the Month: May 2023
- Liga I Team of the Season: 2022–23
