= Roberto Mangú =

Italian painter

Roberto Mangú Quesada, also known as Roberto Mangú, and Roberto Mangou, is a Franco-Spanish painter, draughtsman and sculptor. His career mainly developed in Italy. Deeply influenced by Bonnard and Chagall, his successive workshops in Paris, Milan, Seville, Madrid, Brussels, Genoa are all stages where, starting from "the need to take up the question of being" dear to Martin Heidegger, he has gradually developed a work centered on the adventure of man based on the long term and on the invariances of the world which he calls Permanenza. According to him, Permanenza "is none other than a second age of modernity built on the epiphanies of the invariances of the world - is a response to post-modernity and to decline, a second age which proclaims that the world will be saved by beauty, a second age of modernity which proclaims the need to connect man to nature and the living”.

His work is essentially distinguished by an unclassifiable and very marked pictorial style, strongly influenced by Assyrian and Persian sculpture and bas-reliefs.

From its origins, his painting has developed in the spirituality of these two converging axes: first, the return and the presence of being in the invariances of the world where as he says under the pseudonym of Jean Exekias, "everything changes but nothing changes”. By the timeless dimension of his vision, his painting presents itself free from all the standards of Contemporary Art according to the definition of Aude de Kerros and is defined as an oracular, heralding painting based on the idea of global nature, of continuum, inspired by Diderot. According to him, faced with the need for a paradigm shift – generated by indicators of the ongoing exhaustion of modernity – his painting offers the exact opposite of Cubism. He says: “This path of global nature that Bonnard carried is radically opposed to all the painting of the beginning of the 20th century which carried the announcement of the triumph of modernity. It is up to the splendid Cubism not only to have announced modernity, but above all to have given it its form: fragmentation; which is the exact opposite of the continuum”.

To Bonnard's formula “the work of art, a stopping of time”, Mangú specifies “the work of art, a reality in the making”.

His most emblematic work is embodied in the form of a zoomorphic, anthropomorphic, mineral, vegetal and magnetic being that he named Mintak. Mintak is a formal emanation of the vital force which seems to draw from the sources of life. Mangú did not consciously paint the first Mintak. His painting preceded him. It was while observing his San Francesco, completed in 1992 and which intrigued him, that, years later, he became aware of a presence struggling in the body of the Saint. Mintak himself invited himself into Mangú's painting. The appearance of Mintak, between mythical figure and magical spirit, since then, has inhabited his paintings as a testimony that they are at the source of all things in the world materializing the simultaneous presence of the spirit of Man in the invariances of Real and Time.

== Biography ==
The eras of Mangú's work are inseparable from the path that saw them born and correspond to the evolution of his pictorial thought.

In 1962, at the age of 14, he entered the statuary workshop of Mario Luisetti and attended the Académie de la Grande Chaumière. In 1968, he entered the École nationale supérieure des Beaux-Arts, architecture section from which he graduated as a DPLG architect in 1976. From 1976 to 1979, he traveled to Iran, Turkey, Greece, Spain and Italy.

In 1979, he was in Paris, and associated with the architect Michel Écochard whom he met in Tehran, he participated in the first competition of the Institut du Monde Arabe. This invitational competition, reserved for six teams, was ultimately never judged. The second competition took place on another site and was won by Jean Nouvel.

These years were marked by the increasingly irresistible call of painting - nevertheless, although having ceased to practice the profession of architect, he completed the work on Villa S in Asnières, which was his ultimate built project. Villa S - selected by the French Institute of Architecture in Paris for the exhibition Private houses - Selected examples in 1987 earned it significant international recognition.

From the end of 1981, his former architectural agency in Paris was emptied of everything that constituted it and became his workshop.

In his first period, from 1981 to 1986, he settled in Paris where he painted monumental paintings, Aldébaran, Bételgeuse, Dolce Vita which were exhibited at the Georges Lavrov gallery and published in the magazine Artforum in 1983.

From 1987 to 1995, Roberto Mangú lived in Milan where he notably painted the series Gli Uomini in piedi (Standing Men) exhibited among others by Philippe Daverio and at the Cantini Museum in Marseille. The paintings Corpus Mundi, San Francesco or Gracias y mucha suerte para todos (inspired by Le Bateau ivre, a poem by Arthur Rimbaud) are representative of this Milanese period.

In 1995, Roberto Mangú returned to Spain where he lived in Seville and then Madrid. It is there, in his painting San Francesco (inspired by Zurbaran) that the shadow of Mintak arises in his consciousness, coming from what Mangú calls "the Jaguar spirit", and which for him represents the force of life and its concept of Permanenza .

From 2001 to 2004, Roberto Mangú settled near Toulouse where his art underwent a profound renewal. Inspired by landscapes and a pilgrimage to Santiago de Compostela, he developed new series including hollow-drawn houses or paths that tear the canvas (Camino de Santiago, Via Natura, Les Blés à la Cadiscié).

After living in Brussels, Roberto Mangú returned to France where he worked around new colors: the orange of his Permanenza period (illustrated by the paintings Le Visage d'une Eve, La suite du Temps, Salvador) then the calmer blue from his Mar Adentro period. He also develops the series of the previous period (his Houses were extended by Codexes, the Mintak started to haunt new series like Ombra dell'Inizio or Rivage).

In 2013, he returned to Italy and settled in Genoa. It is there that he begins to develop a synthesis of his pictorial approach which combines Mintak, dance, kinesics and the idea of continuum. Cinesica magica, La Suite du Temps, La Grande Bellezza, L'Uno and Grand-Vivant from 2019 are emblematic paintings of this approach.

== Works ==
=== Formal Aspects ===
Because of the vitality shown in his earlier paintings notably "Virée sur la côte" or "Taureau mécanique", his extraordinary knowledge and skillful use of colours especially intense reds (cf Lola), his work is sometimes mistakenly cited as belonging to one of the following movements: neo-expressionism, or Transavantgarde. Some have also wrongly likened his work to that of the nouveaux fauves.

As Alessandra Troncana remarks in the Corriere della Serra Mangú's work is far too original and personal to be so easily classified. Over time, he has shifted to darker colours and used a variety of techniques, working notably sometimes in negative: the object is drawn by taking off (rather than adding) colour through painting large surfaces in white on a coloured background (the "Pan y Vino" series). Later Mangú returned to colour, especially with the intense orange of his Permanenza period before coming back to calmer blues in his Mar Adentro period.

In 2023, Aude de Kerros cites him several times in her book Hidden Art Finally Unveiled, in his capacity as an artist having “chosen France despite the dogmatic rule because that is where he dreamed of being ».

=== Themes ===
There are recurring themes in the work of Mangú. In Le Cœur émeraude de Roberto Mangú, Alain Santacreu sees in this the expression of "an ancestral pictorial tradition, primordial, rooted in the religiosity of origins."

Philippe Daverio wrote: "tu per me rappresenti una Spagna pittorica che non ha nulla a che vedere con i libri di storia dell’arte e ancor meno con i musei di Madrid. Ciò che mi ha colpito, la prima volta che ho visto i tuoi quadri, è lo spirito feroce, ribelle e indomabile che li animava. Ciò che mi ha convinto della loro autenticità, era quanto essi corrispondessero al tuo aspetto medesimo. Tu non hai ricominciato a dipingere. Tu hai sempre dipinto. E persisti nel dipingere a modo tuo, con tanto vigore. La tua visione fisica e corporale, la tua visione metafisica, è come le tue radici lontane nelle vie di Parigi, quelle dei gitani".

In the 1980-90s, these themes include standing men, monoliths, saints, which all seem to converge in his large masterpiece, a dark picture of a "Saint George" In the 2000-10s, according to Gwen Garnier-Duguy in Le Sens de l'Épopée, three central themes run through Roberto Mangú's paintings: Mintak, seen as an Aleph by Santacreu, Permanenza and La Refloraison du Monde.

=== 1st period [1981 - 1987] - series Les Etoiles / Les Cyclistes / Women on the Terrace ===
The Stars series – Antares, Altair, Aldebaran, Rigel, Trip to the Coast. His monumental painting Aldebaran is the symbol of this new path . Aldebaran, like a new impassive divinity, will become the shepherd and the mirror before which all his painting seems to be reflected. A sensation echoed in Shepherd in the Clouds and The Sleeping Soldier's Dream.

The Cyclists series – The cycle race which he sees as an ancient discipline. The encounter with this modern discipline, and the ancient vision he has of it, already prefigures his conception of immobile time. The vision of the cyclists, represented in their race, does not simulate movement but on the contrary presents a character of immobility which propels them through all times. Some paintings: Quadriga, Winner, Mechanical Toro, Gothic Journey...

The Women on the Terrace series – the archetype of timeless femininity. Guided by his primordial and fundamental intuition of a necessary reconquest of the figure of the world and the adventure of man of which femininity is the source. HollywoodStar.

=== 2nd period [1988 - 1996] - Standing Men / Divers series ===
His life in Milan revolves around two series – the Standing Men and the Divers – a set of paintings which highlight his positioning with regard to the fundamental concept of duration which he opposes to the inseparable couple of time and progress. Freed from the obligation of the new and the religion of progress – as Jean-Claude Michéa explained in his 2014 book The Orpheus Complex – his paintings present themselves as a manifestation of an immutable and timeless dream of the human adventure, that of man, the keystone, rooted between his cave origins and his time.

Subsequently he painted the entire series of Standing Men : Matador, l'Uomo in piedi nello scuro, l'Uomo in piedi nella luce …

=== 3rd era [1997 - 2000] - The revelation of Mintak ===
Mintak first manifests itself unconsciously in the painting of Roberto Mangú in 1992, in a canvas named San Francesco, painted in Milan. A second canvas representing the Saint painted in 1997 in Madrid later revealed on the surface of the painting the form which lived at the heart of the first version. This radically changed Mangú's life.

=== 4th era [2001 - 2007] - The Reflowering of the world ===
The paintings from this period underline the continuity of the spirit which has animated his painting since Aldebaran. After first passing through the starry world which for him is a metaphor "of an Olympus for today", then through the era of Standing Men, a vision of the return of the adventure of man, the birth de Mintak orders all his painting under the aegis of the law of the “true world” stated by Heraclitus. This direct influence of pre-Socratic philosophers, highlighted by Mintak, which highlights the existence of the fixed in the moving, will lead him to a global vision that he calls The Reflowering of the World . Paintings like Foundation I and II, Houses, Standard, White Spirit and Genesi are some emblems. The Wheats of Cadiscié, small paintings which open the great paths of Belonging, Virgen de la natura, Camino de Santiago, Estela del Mintak... underline in their forms this vision of the fixed in the moving.

In La Rochelle, where he lived for a year, he painted La Vie Intérieure, a title he borrowed from Victor Brauner, whom he particularly appreciated for his magical and vital vision of painting. He also painted there, among others, Music, La Grande Baigneuse, L'Homme Solaire, La Cabane de Gauguin, Arabesque, Esprit Corsaire...

=== 5th era [2008 - 2013] - The Depth ===
Departure from Brussels. He set up his workshop in a large, very old house in Burgundy, near Vézelay. Resumes the sculpture by the series of Immortelles, polychromed woods : Eve, Mary, Mary Magdalene, Isis and Mary the Egyptian.

The Permanent Exhibition in Rome is presented again twice. First at the Stella & Vega Gallery in Brest, then in October in Paris at the La Trace gallery on rue de Lille. On the day of the inauguration, the media made official the Subprime crisis which had been brewing since 2006. Among others, he exhibited Salvador, Chief Seattle and the first Ombra dell'Inizio painted in Brussels.

In the spring of 2011, in the company of his wife and two friends, he was invited to a private visit to the Arcy-sur-Cure cave. This visit, which lasted several hours, guided by an expert in cave art, has had a considerable impact on him. Of course, there are the mammoths painted on the walls and everything else you would expect to see in a prehistoric cave; but what strikes him most in the maze of this very long cave which goes deep, is the silent and still body of water that it contains within it. This timeless vision reminded him of a line from Gérard de Nerval 's poem, El Desdichado : "I dreamed in the cave where the mermaid swims." After this timeless journey into the cave, inside him, he heard this verse, like a little music that never left him. This visit to the Arcy cave and the little music will give birth to his painting Pax and the spirit of all the paintings which will later be exhibited at the Santa Giulia Museum in Brescia.

He begins a set of studies that revolve around water, time and the mystery of life's journey.

The motif of the boat appears, a boat inhabited by a woman who holds the mystery in her hands. From these studies will be born, Mar Adentro, Pax, Poseidone, Territorio Parietale, Mediterraneo Ædificandi…

In 2011, in response to the invitation from the Bonnard Museum, he wrote the text Les Enfants de Bonnard which was published in the Museum's inauguration catalogue: Bonnard et le Cannet. In the light of the Mediterranean.

In 2012, Roberto Mangu appeared on the cover of the book Du religion dans l'art - contrelittérature, published under the direction of Alain Santacreu with his painting The Emerald Heart.

The first of three Mar Adentro exhibitions opens at the Santa Giulia Museum in Brescia on December 2, 2012. Publication of the Mar Adentro catalog, Brescia Musei – Fondazione Credito Valtellinese.

=== 6th era, since 2013 - Soleils, Codex and Grand Vivant Series ===
In 2013, he painted Sol invictus and Pure yellow, these two paintings which can be seen as emblems of unconquered life, of triumphant life, generate the entire series of Suns in the shape of sunflowers.

After the suns, he takes up the theme of the Codex, which appeared in his painting in 2011, which is a theme of continuous reflection for our time on the Mediterranean essence of European civilization. Like the Rosetta Stone which presented a legal text in three languages, the Mangú Codex are foundation stones of recovered memory. Like the concretion in a block, images of European identity which live in the invariances of the world. Among others, he created Codex, Codex Jaune, Castillo Interior II, Codex Bleu, ...

Since 2018, a new branch of his painting has emerged: Grand Vivant . This series takes its name from the book Assisi, An Unexpected Encounter by François Cheng which evokes his spiritual encounter with Francis of Assisi .

His painting Grand Vivant is exhibited at the Bonnard museum in Le Cannet in 2022 in the exhibition Les Enfants de Bonnard and at the Gaillac Museum of Fine Arts the same year.

== Main individual exhibitions ==
- 1983, Galerie Georges Lavrov, Paris
- 1984, Galerie Catherine Macé, Cannes.
- 1984, Galerie Georges Lavrov, Paris
- 1985, Galerie Catherine Macé, Cannes
- 1988, Galeria Ontiveros, Madrid
- 1989, Galerie Catherine Macé, Cannes.
- 1989, Galeria Ontiveros, Madrid
- 1990, Galeria Ontiveros, Madrid
- 1991, Galleria Philippe Daverio, Milan
- 1992, Galleria Philippe Daverio, Milan
- 1995, Galleria Philippe Daverio, Milan
- 1998, " Saint Georges ", Galerie Georges Fall, Paris
- 2001, Palazzo delle Stelline, Centre Culturel Français, Milan
- 2003, " Regard ", Centro Mostre per l'Arte Contemporanea Venti Correnti, Milan
- 2005, " Roberto Mangú ", MUDIMAdrie (Fondazione Mudima), Anvers
- 2006, " Fuego ", Centro Mostre per l'Arte Contemporanea Venti Correnti, Milan
- 2007, " Permanenza ", Galleria L’Archimede, Roma
- 2008, " Permanenza ", Galerie La Trace, Paris
- 2008, " Permanenza ", Galerie Stella & Vega, Brest
- 2011, "Itinérance I, « Autour d'un tableau » de Roberto Mangú", Stella & Vega Production, Galerie Janos, Paris
- 2012, "Mar Adentro", Museo di Santa Giulia, Brescia
- 2013, " Mar Adentro ", Galleria Carifano, Fano
- 2013, " Mar Adentro ", Institut français Milano
- 2014, " Soleil ", Galerie Sélective Art, Paris
- 2022, " Mintak ", Musée des Beaux-Arts de Gaillac, 15 october - 18 december 2022 (postponed from 2020)

== Main collective exhibitions ==
- 1983, Galerie Georges Lavrov, Paris
- 1983, Galerie Georges Lavrov, Saint – Tropez
- 1984, Salon d'art contemporain de Montrouge, Paris
- 1984, Art Basel 84, Bâle
- 1984, International Contemporary Art Fair, Londres
- 1985, Salon d'art contemporain de Montrouge, Paris.
- 1985, Salon de Mai, Paris.
- 1985, International Contemporary Art Fair, Londres
- 1986, Galerie Catherine Macé, Cannes.
- 1986, Galerie Georges Lavrov, Paris.
- 1986, Art Jonction, Nice.
- 1986, Galerie Ontiveros, Madrid
- 1987, Masques d’artistes, La Malmaison, Cannes.
- 1987, Maisons, examples choisis, Institut français d'architecture, Paris
- 1989, Galerie Dacal, Madrid.
- 1989, Galerie Catherine Macé, Cannes.
- 1989, "Mangú, Pacea", Galeria Ontiveros, Madrid
- 1990, "Le Paradis des Peintres", Musée de la Castre, Cannes
- 1990, Galeria Ontiveros, Madrid.
- 1990, Galleria Shubert, Milan
- 1991, "Les Couleurs de l’Argent", Musée de la Poste, Paris
- 1992, "Arthur Rimbaud et les artistes du XX^{e} siècle", Musée Cantini, Marseille
- 1993, Galleria Philippe Daverio, Milan
- 1994, "Alternative", Galleria Philippe Daverio, Milan
- 1994, "Il Corpo", Galleria Philippe Daverio, Milan
- 1995, Coll.priv, Palazzo delle Stelline, Milan
- 1995, "Art Tabac", sous la direction de Pierre Restany, Scuderie di Palazzo Ruspoli, Rome
- 1996, Coll.priv, Palazzo delle Stelline, Milan
- 1996, "Anni’90 a Milano", Sala Napoleonica, Accademia di Brera, Milan
- 1998, "Accrochage", Galerie Georges Fall, Paris
- 1999, "Babelia", MiArt (Galleria Philippe Daverio), Milan
- 1999, Fiera d’arte contemporanea di Milan
- 2001, Galerie Antoine Ranc, T.S.F. Paris
- 2002, Linéart, foire d’art moderne & contemporain (Galerie Antoine Ranc), Ghent
- 2004, "De leur temps : collections privées françaises", ADIAF, Musée des Beaux-Arts de Tourcoing
- 2004, Art Paris, foire d’art moderne & contemporain (Centro Mostre per l'Arte Contemporanea Venti Correnti), Paris
- 2005, Art Paris, foire d’art moderne & contemporain (Centro Mostre per l'Arte Contemporanea Venti Correnti), Paris
- 2005, Centro Mostre per l'Arte Contemporanea Venti Correnti, Milan.
- 2006, "Figures et Portraits", Stella & Vega Production, Brest
- 2007, "Papiers d’artistes", Stella & Vega Production, Brest et Paris
- 2007, Centro Mostre per l'Arte Contemporanea Venti Correnti, Milan
- 2008, "Collection privée", Stella Collection, Brest
- 2010, "10 sérigraphies", Sérithèque, Montpellier
- 2011, "10 Artistes, Galerie Janos", Paris
- 2012 "4 hispaniques en noir et blanc +une", Galerie Janos, Paris
- 2015, Gœthes Farbenlebre, Institut Français de Mainz Allemagne
- 2015, Creval Contemporary 30 anni di comunicazione visiva per l’arte, Fondazione del crédito Valtelinese
- 2017, "Au fil de la Méditerranée ", Bogéna Galerie, St Paul de Vence
- 2022, Les Enfants de Bonnard, Musée Bonnard, Le Cannet
- 2023, Rédemption, 3^{e} Biennale d’Art Sacré de Menton

== Bibliography ==
- Roberto Mangú has been the subject of academic work by researchers at La Sorbonne, including a Master's dissertation and a PhD
  - Roberto Mangú : Portrait d'un peintre méditerranéen, Véronique Serrano, mémoire de maîtrise sous la direction de Fanette Roche, Université Paris-Panthéon Sorbonne, Paris 1984
  - Roberto Mangú : Carnets : Mise en évidence d'une mécanique artistique et politique moderne, Véronique Serrano, thèse de doctorat engagée en 2000 sous la direction d'Eric Darragon
- Gérard George Lemaire in "9 artistes à Milan aujourdh'hui"
- Opus International N° 119 Paris mai juin 1990
- Mangú. Le passager des étoiles, Jean-François Gautier and Dominique Stella, Mazzotta 1998. ISBN 88-202-1293-5
- Roberto Mangú, Permanenza, Shin Factory, ASIN B00T02D8AS
- Roberto Mangú: Regard, Dominique Stella, Milan : Mudima, 2002
- Roberto Mangú : Mar adentro, Dominique Stella, Véronique Serrano, Milan : Grafiche Aurora, 2012. ISBN 88-979-1305-9
- Roberto Mangù, Fuego, Milan : Venti Correnti, 2006
- Nox, Gwen Garnier-Duguy and Néro, Editions Le Grand Souffle, Paris, 2006, ISBN 2-916492-24-0
- "Les Enfants de Bonnard", Roberto Mangú in Bonnard et Le Cannet : dans la lumière de la Méditerranée, Véronique Serrano, Paris, Hazan 2011 ISBN 27-541-0561-1
- Mintak - Roberto Mangu Quesada Silvana Editoriale Milano (ISBN 978-88-366-4431-5)
