= Mahlangu =

Mahlangu is a surname.

== Geographical distribution ==
As of 2014, 95.6% of all known bearers of the surname Mahlangu were residents of South Africa (frequency 1:254) and 3.9% of Zimbabwe (1:1,760).

In South Africa, the frequency of the surname was higher than national average (1:254) in the following provinces:

1. Mpumalanga (1:33)
2. Gauteng (1:254)

In Zimbabwe, the frequency of the surname was higher than national average (1:1,760) in the following provinces:

1. Bulawayo (1:376)
2. Matabeleland South (1:420)
3. Matabeleland North (1:422)

== People ==
Notable people with the surname include:

- Bongani Mahlangu (born 1979), boxer from South Africa
- Chris Mahlangu, killer of Eugène Terre'Blanche (1941–2010), South African politician and founder and leader of the Afrikaner Weerstandsbeweging (AWB)
- Duncan Mahlangu (born 1983), South African taekwondo practitioner who competed in the men's featherweight category
- Esther Mahlangu (born 1935), South African Ndebele artist
- Jabu Mahlangu (formerly Jabu Jeremiah Pule) (born 1980), retired South African football (soccer) midfielder
- July Mahlangu (born 1980), South African football (soccer) midfielder for Thanda Royal Zulu
- Lebogang Mahlangu (born 1997), South African scientist and model
- M. J. Mahlangu, South African politician
- Magodonga Mahlangu, women's rights campaigner from Zimbabwe who in 2009 was awarded the Robert F Kennedy Human Rights Award by U.S. President Barack Obama
- May Mahlangu (born 1989), South African footballer
- Moses Mahlangu (born 1925), long-time supporter of the teachings of The Church of Jesus Christ of Latter-day Saints (LDS Church) in South Africa
- Sibusiso Mahlangu (born 1982), South African football (soccer) player
- Sipho Mahlangu, South African politician
- Solomon Mahlangu (1956–1979), South African operative of the African National Congress (ANC) militant wing, Umkhonto weSizwe (MK), hanged for murder in 1979
- Qedani Mahlangu, (born 1968) the former Gauteng MEC for Health and Social Development
- Thamsanqa Mahlangu (died 2015), former MDC politician and Zimbabwe Deputy Minister of Youth Development, Indigenisation and Empowerment
- Gwen Mahlangu-Nkabinde (born 1955), South African politician who was Speaker of the National Assembly of South Africa from 2008 to 2009
- Zena Mahlangu (born 1984), Swazi royal and wife of 10th wife of Mswati III

== See also ==
- Mahlangu Tigers FC, South African football (soccer) club, with the full official name Mahlangu Tigers
- Malan (disambiguation)
- Malang
- Mangu (disambiguation)
