= Mangu =

Mangu may refer to:

== Places ==
- Mangu, Burma, a village
- Mangu, Estonia, a village
- Mangu, Nigeria, a Local Government Area
- Mangu Farm, a settlement in Kenya
- Mangu station, a railway station in Seoul
- Mangu-dong, a dong (neighborhood) of Seoul, South Korea

== People ==
- Möngke Khan (1209–1259), sometimes spelled Mangu, Great Khan of the Mongol Empire
- Roberto Mangú (born 1948), French painter
- Mangu (rapper), Dominican-born rapper; see Nojazz

== Other uses ==
- Mang'u High School, a national high school in Kenya
- Mangú, a traditional dish from the Dominican Republic
- Mangu, the concept in the culture of the Azande people usually referred to as witchcraft
- Mangú (song), a 2016 song by pop-singer Becky G
