= Mihai Voduț =

Romanian footballer

Personal information
- Full name: Mihai Voduț
- Date of birth: 28 July 1994 (age 32)
- Place of birth: Bucharest, Romania
- Height: 1.78 m (5 ft 10 in)
- Position: Striker

Senior career*
Years	Team	Apps	(Gls)
2011–2013	Chindia Târgoviște	24	(5)
2014–2017	Voluntari	73	(20)
2018–2019	Viitorul Constanța	22	(3)
2019	Beitar Jerusalem	7	(0)
2019	Chindia Târgoviște	11	(2)
Total		137	(30)

International career
2012	Romania U19	3	(1)
2015	Romania U21	3	(0)
- * Club domestic league appearances and goals

Mihai Voduț (born 28 July 1994) is a Romanian former professional footballer who played as a striker.
