= Paul Șerban =

Romanian footballer

Personal information
- Full name: Paul Alexandru Șerban
- Date of birth: 16 July 2001 (age 25)
- Place of birth: Constanța, Romania
- Height: 1.82 m (6 ft 0 in)
- Position: Goalkeeper

Team information
- Current team: Farul II Constanța

Youth career
- Gheorghe Hagi Academy

Senior career*
Years	Team	Apps	(Gls)
2018–2021	Viitorul Constanța	0	(0)
2020–2021	Viitorul II Constanța	4	(0)
2021–	Farul II Constanța	0	(0)

International career^{‡}
2017–2018	Romania U17	4	(0)
- * Club domestic league appearances and goals as of 07:30, 21 June 2022 (UTC) ‡ National team caps and goals as of 22 September 2018

Paul Alexandru Șerban (born 16 July 2001) is a Romanian professional footballer who plays as a goalkeeper for Farul II Constanța.

== Honours ==
Viitorul Constanța

- Cupa României: 2018–19
