= Eduard Florescu =

Romanian footballer (born 1997)

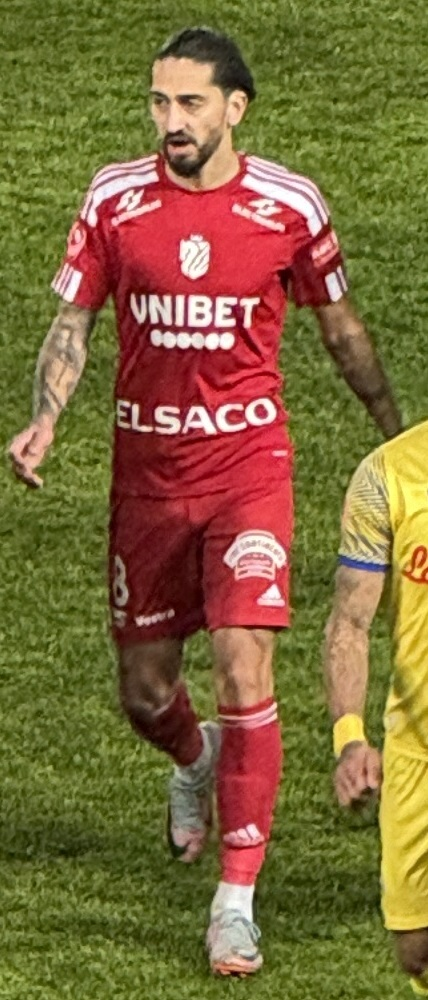
- Florescu with Botoșani in 2023

Personal information
- Full name: Eduard Marian Florescu
- Date of birth: 27 June 1997 (age 29)
- Place of birth: Pitești, Romania
- Height: 1.88 m (6 ft 2 in)
- Position: Midfielder

Youth career
- 2005–2013: Argeș Pitești

Senior career*
Years	Team	Apps	(Gls)
2013–2018	Mioveni	82	(10)
2018	Viitorul Constanța	0	(0)
2018–2022	Botoșani	80	(6)
2019	→ Argeș Pitești (loan)	16	(2)
2022–2023	Universitatea Craiova	1	(0)
2023–2025	Botoșani	73	(13)
2025	Elimai	9	(1)
2025	Unirea Slobozia	16	(1)
2026	Hermannstadt	15	(1)

International career
2021	Romania Olympic	4	(0)
- * Club domestic league appearances and goals as of 11 May 2026

Eduard Marian Florescu (Romanian pronunciation: [ˈedu.ard floˈresku]; born 27 June 1997) is a Romanian professional footballer who plays as a midfielder.

== Club career ==
Florescu spent his junior years at his hometown club Argeș Pitești, but started his senior career at nearby Liga II team Mioveni in 2013. He played there for five years, before moving to Liga I club Viitorul Constanța in June 2018.

In August 2018, Florescu joined fellow league team Botoșani, after not appearing in any match for Viitorul Constanța. In January 2019, he was loaned out to his boyhood club Argeș Pitești until the end of the season.

On 5 September 2022, Florescu was transferred to Universitatea Craiova, agreeing to a two-year deal with an option to extend for a further year. He returned to Botoșani in January the following year, after failing to impose himself at Craiova.

== International career ==
In June 2021, Florescu was selected by manager Mirel Rădoi in the squad for the postponed 2020 Summer Olympics.
