= Alexandru Iulian Stoica =

Romanian footballer

Alexandru Stoica
Personal information
- Full name: Alexandru Iulian Stoica
- Date of birth: 30 June 1997 (age 29)
- Place of birth: Baia, Romania
- Height: 1.81 m (5 ft 11 in)
- Positions: Midfielder; forward

Team information
- Current team: Axiopolis Cernavodă
- Number: 9

Youth career
- –2015: Gheorghe Hagi Academy

Senior career*
Years	Team	Apps	(Gls)
2015–2021	Viitorul Constanța	6	(0)
2015–2016	→ Dunărea Călărași (loan)	28	(8)
2017	→ Târgu Mureș (loan)	19	(3)
2018	→ Dunărea Călărași (loan)	11	(1)
2019	→ Petrolul Ploiești (loan)	1	(0)
2019–2021	→ Farul Constanța (loan)	39	(6)
2021–2022	Dunărea Călărași	15	(4)
2022–2023	Gloria Bistrița	38	(13)
2023–2024	Deva	20	(8)
2024–	Axiopolis Cernavodă	0	(0)

International career^{‡}
2013	Romania U-16	2	(0)
2014–2015	Romania U-17	6	(1)
2015–2016	Romania U-19	7	(1)
- * Club domestic league appearances and goals as of 08:57, 7 December 2024 (UTC) ‡ National team caps and goals as of 3 October 2016

Alexandru Iulian Stoica (born 30 June 1997) is a Romanian professional footballer who plays as a midfielder or forward for Axiopolis Cernavodă.

== Honours ==
=== Club ===
Viitorul Constanța

- Liga I: 2016–17

Dunărea Călărași

- Liga II: 2017–18
