= Alexandru Buzbuchi =

Romanian footballer

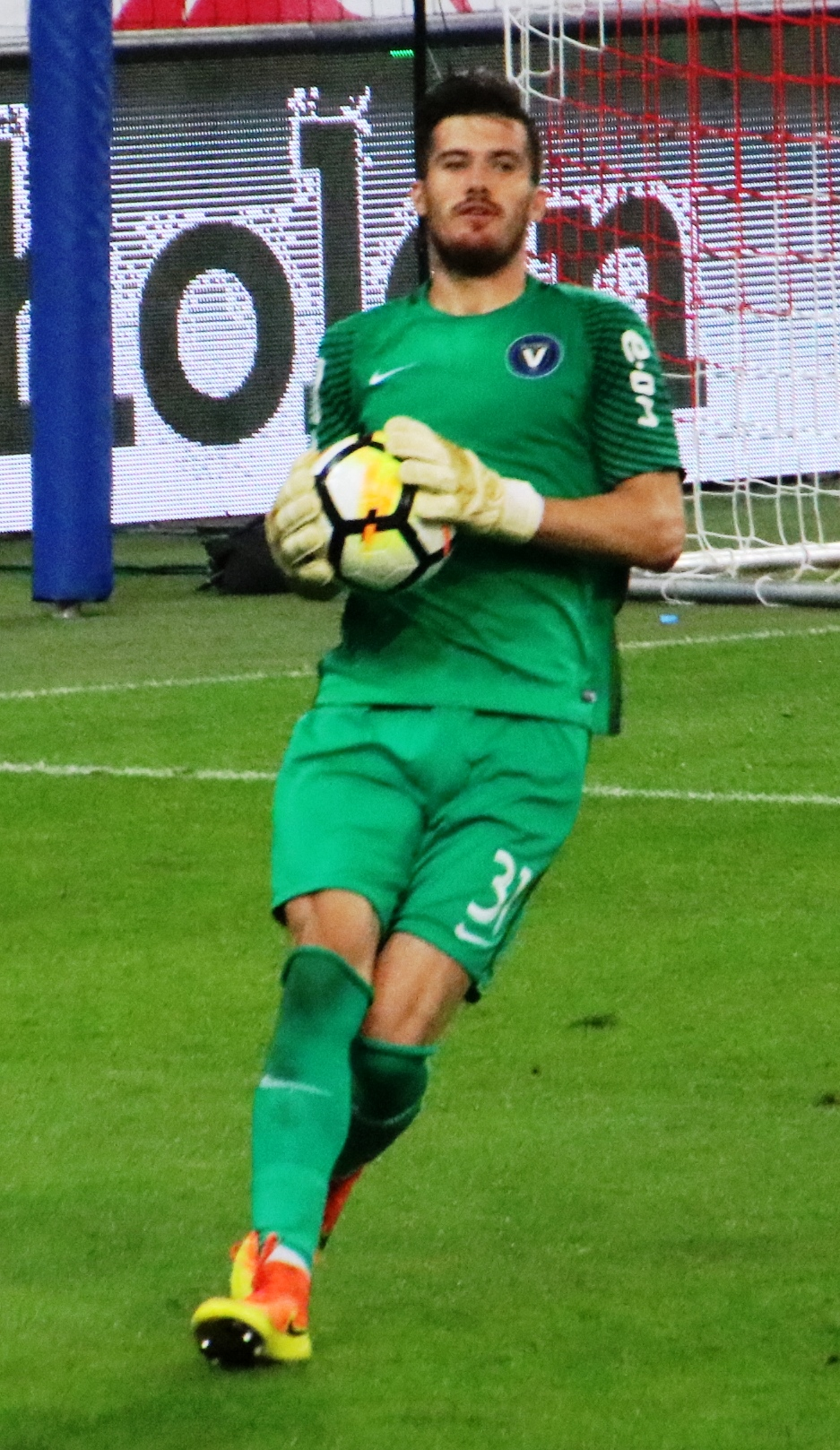

Personal information
- Date of birth: 31 October 1993 (age 33)
- Place of birth: Constanța, Romania
- Height: 1.87 m (6 ft 2 in)
- Position: Goalkeeper

Team information
- Current team: Farul Constanța
- Number: 1

Youth career
- –2009: Palatul Copiilor Constanța
- 2009–2012: Gheorghe Hagi Academy

Senior career*
Years	Team	Apps	(Gls)
2012–2020	Viitorul Constanța	65	(0)
2020–2022	Gaz Metan Mediaș	20	(0)
2022–	Farul Constanța	88	(0)

International career
2011–2012	Romania U19	5	(0)
2013–2014	Romania U21	6	(0)
- * Club domestic league appearances and goals as of 7 February 2026

Alexandru Buzbuchi (born 31 October 1993) is a Romanian professional footballer who plays as a goalkeeper for Liga I club Farul Constanța.

== Career statistics ==
=== Club ===
As of match played 19 August 2026

Club	Season	League			Cupa României		Europe		Other		Total	
Club	Season	Division	Apps	Goals	Apps	Goals	Apps	Goals	Apps	Goals	Apps	Goals
Viitorul Constanța	2012–13	Liga I	17	0	1	0	–		–		18	0
Viitorul Constanța	2013–14	Liga I	7	0	3	0	–		–		10	0
Viitorul Constanța	2014–15	Liga I	15	0	1	0	–		1 (Note: Appearance in Cupa Ligii)	0	17	0
Viitorul Constanța	2015–16	Liga I	10	0	0	0	–		0	0	10	0
Viitorul Constanța	2016–17	Liga I	8	0	3	0	1 (Note: Appearances in UEFA Europa League)	0	0	0	12	0
Viitorul Constanța	2017–18	Liga I	2	0	0	0	1	0	0	0	3	0
Viitorul Constanța	2018–19	Liga I	6	0	1	0	0	0	–		7	0
Viitorul Constanța	2019–20	Liga I	0	0	0	0	0	0	0	0	0	0
Viitorul Constanța	Total		65	0	9	0	2	0	1	0	77	0
Gaz Metan Mediaș	2020–21	Liga I	16	0	2	0	–		–		18	0
Gaz Metan Mediaș	2021–22	Liga I	4	0	2	0	–		–		6	0
Gaz Metan Mediaș	Total		20	0	4	0	–		–		24	0
Farul Constanța	2022–23	Liga I	1	0	3	0	–		–		4	0
Farul Constanța	2023–24	Liga I	22	0	3	0	0	0	0	0	25	0
Farul Constanța	2024–25	Liga I	39	0	0	0	–		–		39	0
Farul Constanța	2025–26	Liga I	26	0	0	0	–		1 (Note: Appearance in Liga I promotion/relegation play-offs)	0	27	0
Farul Constanța	2026–27	Liga I	0	0	1	0	–		–		1	0
Farul Constanța	Total		88	0	7	0	0	0	1	0	96	0
Career total			173	0	20	0	2	0	2	0	197	0

== Honours ==
Viitorul Constanța

- Liga I: 2016–17
- Cupa României: 2018–19
- Supercupa României: 2019

Farul Constanța

- Liga I: 2022–23
- Supercupa României runner-up: 2023
