= Ianis Hagi =

Romanian footballer (born 1998)

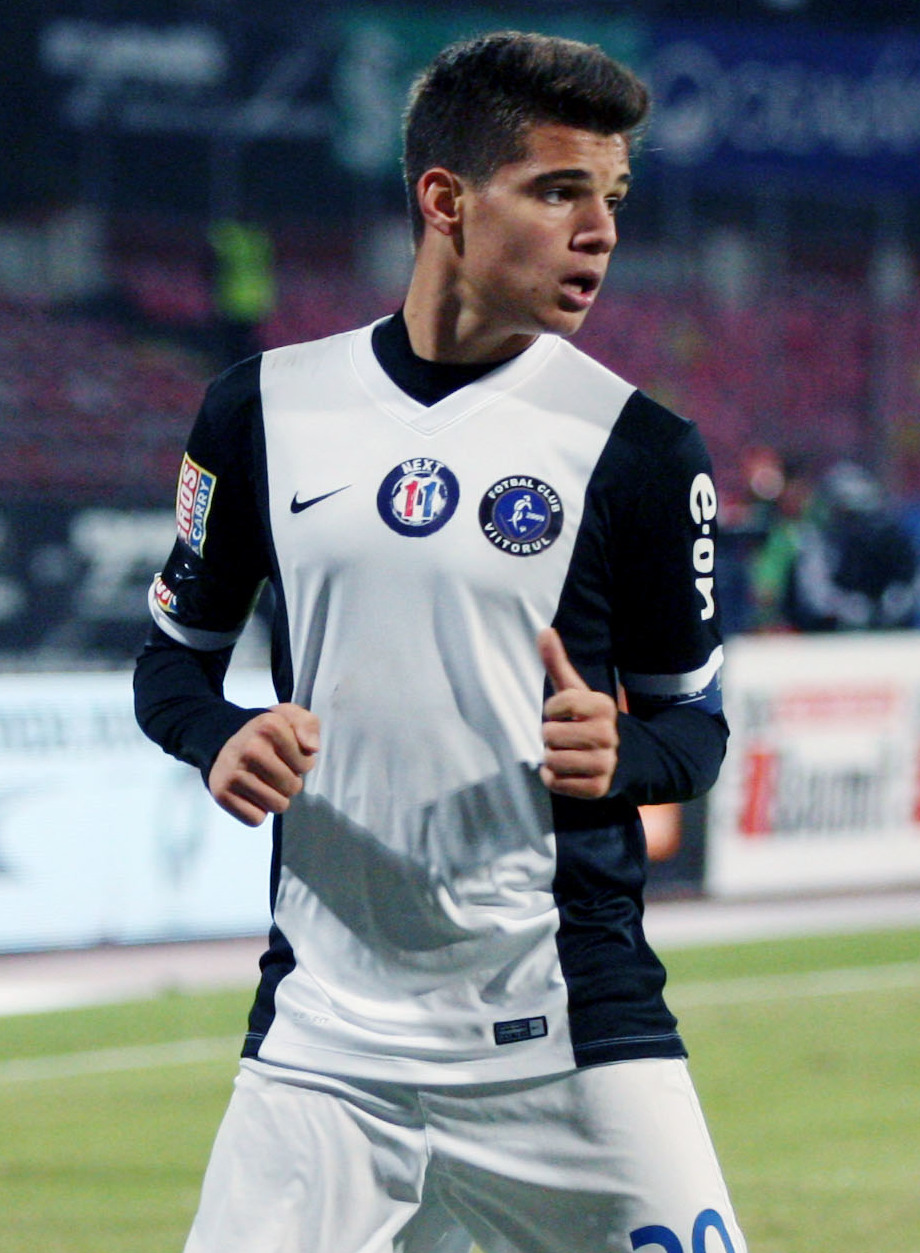
- Hagi playing for Viitorul Constanța in 2015

Personal information
- Full name: Ianis Hagi
- Date of birth: 22 October 1998 (age 28)
- Place of birth: Istanbul, Turkey
- Height: 1.82 m (6 ft 0 in)
- Positions: Attacking midfielder; winger

Team information
- Current team: Alanyaspor
- Number: 10

Youth career
- 2006–2009: Pro Luceafărul București
- 2009–2014: Gheorghe Hagi Academy

Senior career*
Years	Team	Apps	(Gls)
2014–2016	Viitorul Constanța	38	(3)
2016–2018	Fiorentina	2	(0)
2018–2019	Viitorul Constanța	45	(16)
2019–2020	Genk	14	(3)
2020	→ Rangers (loan)	7	(1)
2020–2025	Rangers	80	(14)
2023–2024	→ Alavés (loan)	22	(0)
2025–	Alanyaspor	34	(3)

International career^{‡}
2012–2013	Romania U15		
2013–2014	Romania U16		
2014–2015	Romania U17	9	(0)
2015–2016	Romania U18	3	(2)
2016	Romania U19	3	(3)
2017–2020	Romania U21	17	(4)
2018–	Romania	59	(8)
- * Club domestic league appearances and goals as of 19:06, 14 November 2026 (UTC) ‡ National team caps and goals as of 19:21, 17 November 2026 (UTC)

Ianis Hagi (born 22 October 1998) is a Romanian professional footballer who plays as an attacking midfielder or a winger for Süper Lig club Alanyaspor and the Romania national team.

Hagi made his professional debut for Viitorul Constanța at the age of 16, after having trained at the academy of his father Gheorghe, the joint all-time leading goalscorer of Romania. He moved abroad for the first time in 2016, to Italian side Fiorentina, but only played in two Serie A matches. Hagi returned to Viitorul one and a half years later and won the Cupa României, before leaving again in 2019 for Belgian team Genk. In January 2020, he joined Rangers on an initial loan which was later made permanent, and aided them to win the league title the following season.

Internationally, Hagi earned his first full cap for Romania in a 3–0 UEFA Nations League win over Lithuania in November 2018. He was selected in Romania's squad for UEFA Euro 2024, where they managed to win their group and reach the round of 16.

== Club career ==
=== Early career ===
Ianis Hagi was born on 22 October 1998 in Istanbul, Turkey, where his father Gheorghe was playing for Galatasaray. He joined his namesake Gheorghe Hagi football academy in 2009, and made his Liga I debut for Viitorul Constanța at the age of 16 on 5 December 2014. He came on as a last-minute substitute for Silviu Pană in a 2–1 home defeat to FC Botoșani.

On 29 May 2015, Hagi scored his first goal as a senior, contributing to a 4–4 draw against the same opponent while also acting as a starter for the first time. In June, he gained team captaincy. Hagi scored his second league goal against ACS Poli Timișoara, in a 4–0 home win on 21 August 2015, a few days after having missed a penalty against Concordia Chiajna. In October, he was named by The Guardian as one of the 50 best young footballers in the world born in 1998.

=== Fiorentina ===
On 10 July 2016, Hagi joined Fiorentina for a €2 million transfer fee. He made his league debut on 23 October, replacing Josip Iličić late into a 5–3 away triumph over Cagliari. In April 2017, Hagi was nominated for the European Golden Boy award.

=== Return to Viitorul Constanța ===
Hagi returned to Viitorul Constanța on 18 January 2018 for a reported €2 million, with Fiorentina being entitled to 30% of a future transfer fee. In July, he was again nominated for the European Golden Boy award. During his second spell at his father's team, he scored 20 goals in 53 matches across all competitions. He won his first career trophy on 25 May 2019, after Viitorul defeated Astra Giurgiu 2–1 in the Cupa României final.

=== Genk ===
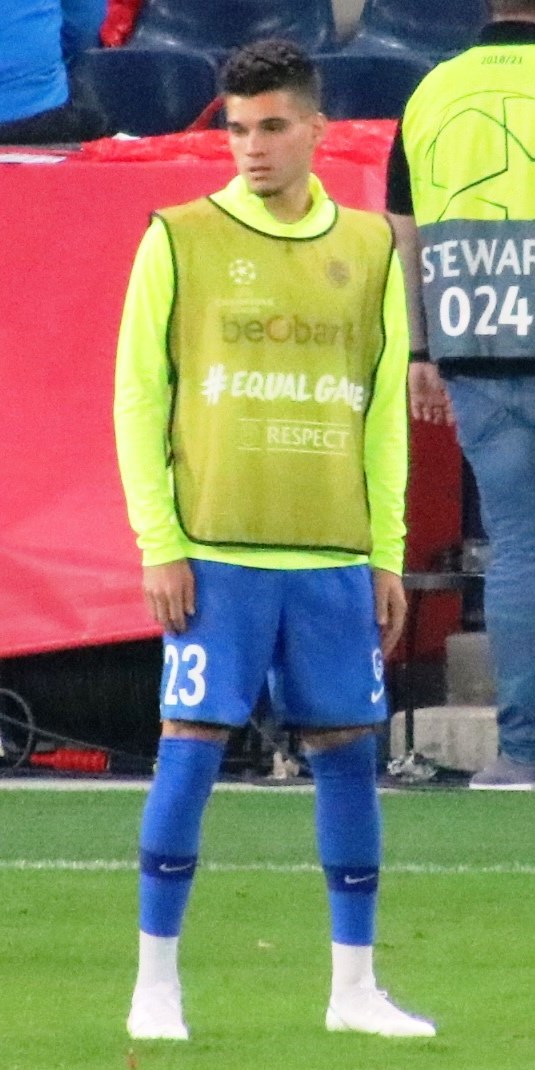
Hagi training for Genk before a UEFA Champions League game against Red Bull Salzburg in September 2019

On 12 July 2019, Belgian defending champions Genk announced the signing of Hagi on a five-year contract. The transfer fee was variously reported as €4 million, €8 million with performance bonuses included, or €10 million for 85% of the players's economic rights plus bonuses. Viitorul executive president Gheorghe Popescu confirmed the club retained interest on the capital gain of a potential future transfer.

On 26 July 2019, in the Belgian First Division A opening fixture, Hagi made his debut by coming off the bench and scoring the winner in a 2–1 victory over Kortrijk. He recorded his next goals on 28 September against Sint-Truiden, netting both from the penalty spot but with different legs, and also assisted Théo Bongonda in the 3–3 draw. He played in five of Genk's group stage matches in the UEFA Champions League, as his side finished fourth behind Liverpool, Napoli and Red Bull Salzburg respectively.

=== Rangers ===
Hagi joined Scottish Premiership club Rangers on a six-month loan with an option to buy on 31 January 2020. The following day, he made his first appearance for the club as a substitute in a goalless draw with Aberdeen. On 5 February, Hagi started and scored the winner in a 2–1 success over Hibernian, while 15 days later he scored twice against Braga in the UEFA Europa League as his side won 3–2. In late May 2020, Rangers announced that they had signed Hagi permanently from Genk on a long-term contract.

Rangers went on to win the Scottish Premiership title at the end of the following season. Individually, Hagi also won the Scottish Premiership Playmaker of the Season award for most assists (11 assists) in the 2020–21 season. On 17 May 2021, Hagi won Rangers Young Player of the Year.

In 2021–22, Hagi contributed one goal to Rangers' run to the 2022 UEFA Europa League Final, coming off the bench to equalise in a 1–1 group draw at Brøndby IF on 4 November. On 21 January 2022, he was substituted after 15 minutes of a cup game against Stirling Albion, and was ruled out for the rest of the season due to a severe knee injury which required surgery. He returned on 28 January the following year as a 72nd-minute substitute in a 2–0 home win over St Johnstone.

On 27 August 2023, Hagi moved to La Liga club Alavés on loan for one season. On 2 November 2023, he scored his first two goals for the club in a 10–0 win against Deportivo Murcia in a Copa del Rey match. Hagi left Rangers at the end of the 2024–25 season as a free agent upon the expiry of his contract.

=== Alanyaspor ===
On 4 September 2025, Hagi signed for Süper Lig club Alanyaspor on a two-year contract. A month later, on 4 October, he scored his first goal from a free-kick in a 2–2 away draw against Gençlerbirliği.

== International career ==
Hagi represented Romania at under-15, under-16, under-17, under-18, under-19 and under-21 levels. On 11 September 2018, he scored a direct corner kick in a 2–0 win over the Bosnia and Herzegovina under-21 team. Two months later, he made his senior debut for Romania in a 3–0 UEFA Nations League win over Lithuania, coming on as a 68th-minute substitute for Claudiu Keșerü.

Hagi was part of the team that qualified for the second time in their history to the European Under-21 Championship, starting in all three group matches of the 2019 final tournament in Italy. He netted one each against Croatia and England to help his side progress to the semi-finals as group winners, where they lost 4–2 to defending champions Germany.

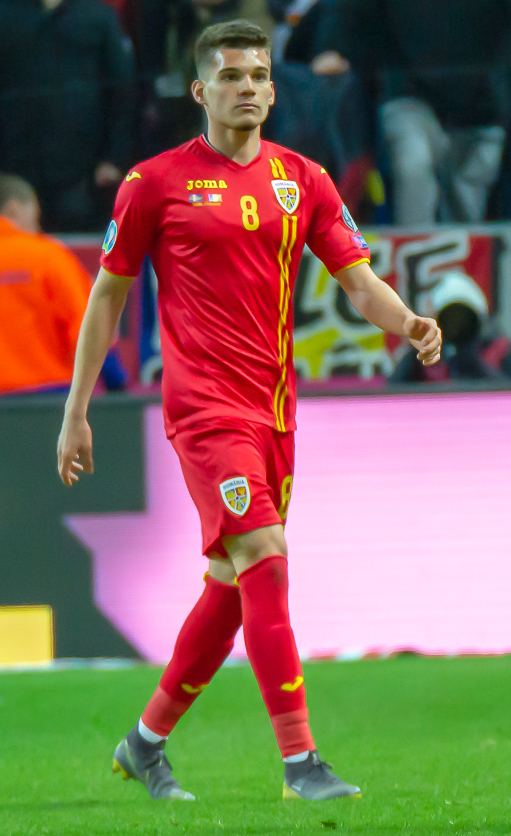
Hagi playing for Romania in a 2–1 loss to Sweden, March 2019

On 25 March 2021, Hagi scored his first senior international goal after coming on as a substitute in a 3–2 home win over North Macedonia in the 2022 FIFA World Cup qualification. In the Euro 2024 qualifiers, he aided with seven appearances and two goals, including the winner in a 2–1 success over Israel on 18 November 2023. Romania went on to finish Group I in first place after a 1–0 defeat of Switzerland three days later, in which Hagi came off the bench in the 64th minute.

== Style of play ==
Once considered to be a promising young talent, Hagi's playing style has drawn comparisons with that of his father's due to his dribbling skills, passing, two-footedness and playmaking ability. His preferred role is that of an attacking midfielder, and he is regarded as a quick, agile and versatile player.

Hagi is also capable of playing in several advanced roles, and has been used as a winger, a second striker or even a centre-forward on occasion. Due to his vision, technique and eye for goal, he is both capable of creating chances for his teammates and scoring goals himself.

== Personal life ==
Hagi has an elder sister, Kira, who is an actress. Their father Gheorghe is of Aromanian descent, and met their mother Marilena in 1993. Gheorghe was playing for Brescia at the time, while the latter was a second-year college student. Ianis is the nephew of another former international footballer Gheorghe Popescu, whose wife Luminiţa is Marilena's sister. His cousin Nicolas Popescu is also a footballer – both of the younger men were born in Istanbul while their fathers were playing for Galatasaray.

Hagi has been sponsored by Nike apparel since his early career. In 2019, he provided the Romanian dubbing for Victor Frankenstein in the Disney animation movie Frankenweenie.

On 14 July 2024, a week after being knocked out of the European Championship with the national team, Hagi and his girlfriend Elena Tănase officially had their ceremonial wedding which was broadcast on national television in Romania; however, their civil wedding had taken place in Paris on 25 December 2023.

== Career statistics ==
=== Club ===
As of match played 14 November 2026

Appearances and goals by club, season and competition
Club	Season	League			National cup (Note: Includes Cupa României, Scottish Cup, Copa del Rey, Turkish Cup)		League cup (Note: Includes Scottish League Cup)		Europe		Total	
Club	Season	Division	Apps	Goals	Apps	Goals	Apps	Goals	Apps	Goals	Apps	Goals
Viitorul Constanța	2014–15	Liga I	7	1	0	0	0	0	—		7	1
Viitorul Constanța	2015–16	Liga I	31	2	1	0	0	0	—		32	2
Viitorul Constanța	Total		38	3	1	0	0	0	—		39	3
Fiorentina	2016–17	Serie A	2	0	0	0	—		—		2	0
Viitorul Constanța	2017–18	Liga I	14	6	0	0	—		—		14	6
Viitorul Constanța	2018–19	Liga I	31	10	4	3	—		4 (Note: Appearances in UEFA Europa League)	1	39	14
Viitorul Constanța	Total		45	16	4	3	—		4	1	53	20
Genk	2019–20	Belgian Pro League	14	3	0	0	—		5 (Note: Appearance(s) in UEFA Champions League)	0	19	3
Rangers (loan)	2019–20	Scottish Premiership	7	1	2	0	—		4	2	13	3
Rangers	2020–21	Scottish Premiership	33	7	2	0	2	0	9	1	46	8
Rangers	2021–22	Scottish Premiership	15	2	1	0	3	1	8 (Note: One appearance in UEFA Champions League, seven appearances and one goal in UEFA Europa League)	1	27	4
Rangers	2022–23	Scottish Premiership	8	1	3	0	0	0	0	0	11	1
Rangers	2023–24	Scottish Premiership	0	0	—		1	0	1	0	2	0
Rangers	2024–25	Scottish Premiership	24	4	2	0	1	0	4	0	31	4
Rangers	Total		80	14	8	0	7	1	22	2	117	17
Alavés (loan)	2023–24	La Liga	22	0	4	2	—		—		26	2
Alanyaspor	2025–26	Süper Lig	26	3	4	2	—		—		30	5
Alanyaspor	2026–27	Süper Lig	8	0	0	0	—		—		8	0
Alanyaspor	Total		34	3	4	2	0	0	0	0	38	5
Career total			242	40	23	7	7	1	35	5	307	53

=== International ===
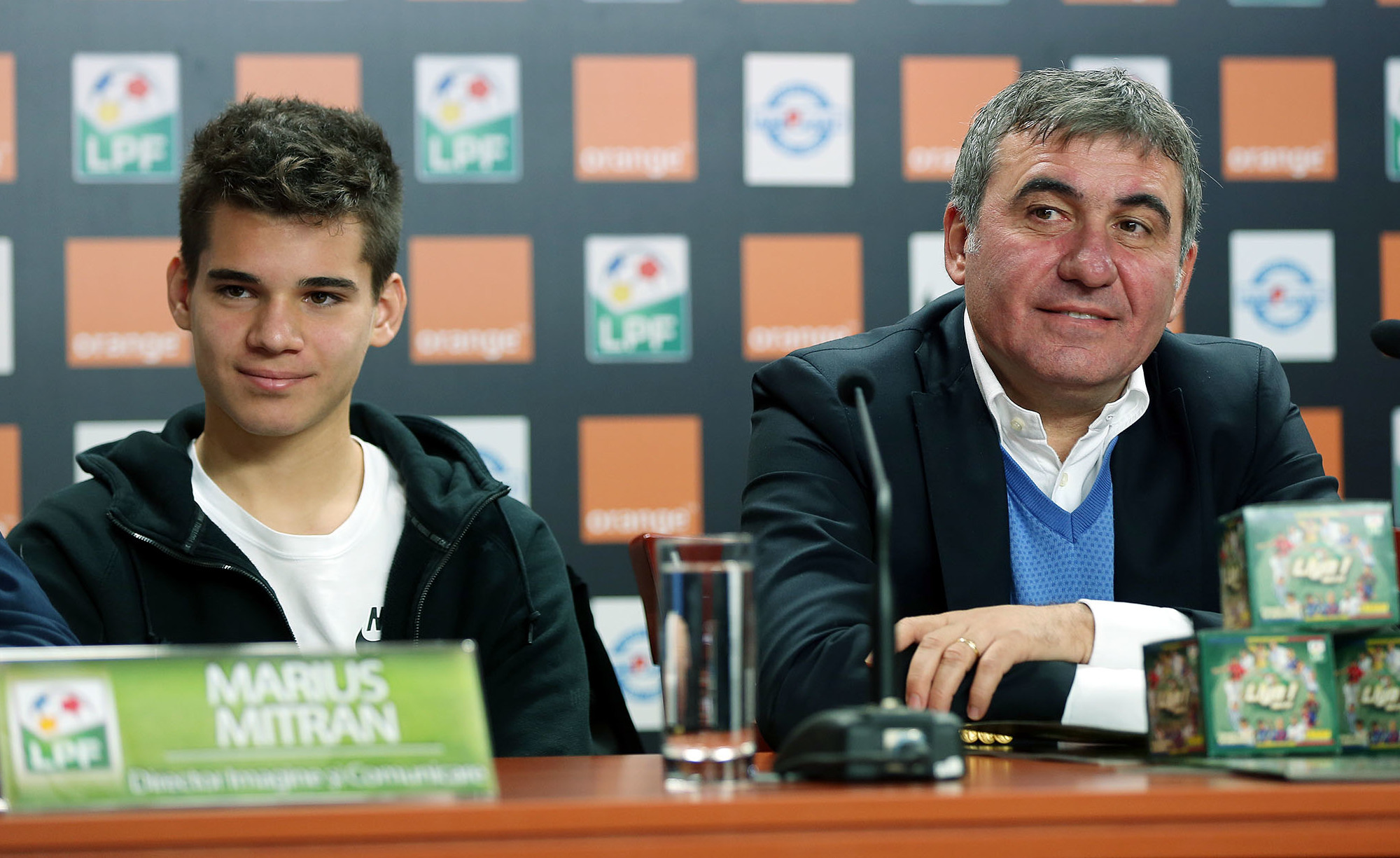
Hagi and his father Gheorghe, the joint all-time leading goalscorer of Romania, in 2015

As of match played 17 November 2026

Appearances and goals by national team and year
National team	Year	Apps	Goals
Romania	2018	1	0
Romania	2019	9	0
Romania	2020	4	0
Romania	2021	10	2
Romania	2022	0	0
Romania	2023	7	2
Romania	2024	14	1
Romania	2025	6	3
Romania	2026	8	0
Total		59	8

Scores and results list Romania's goal tally first, score column indicates score after each Hagi goal

List of international goals scored by Ianis Hagi
No.	Date	Venue	Cap	Opponent	Score	Result	Competition
1	25 March 2021	Arena Națională, Bucharest, Romania	15	North Macedonia	3–2	3–2	2022 FIFA World Cup qualification
2	8 October 2021	Volksparkstadion, Hamburg, Germany	21	Germany	1–0	1–2	2022 FIFA World Cup qualification
3	15 October 2023	Arena Națională, Bucharest, Romania	29	Andorra	2–0	4–0	UEFA Euro 2024 qualifying
4	18 November 2023	Pancho Aréna, Felcsút, Hungary	30	Israel	2–1	2–1	UEFA Euro 2024 qualifying
5	26 March 2024	Metropolitano Stadium, Madrid, Spain	33	Colombia	1–3	2–3	Friendly
6	24 March 2025	San Marino Stadium, Serravalle, San Marino	47	San Marino	4–1	5–1	2026 FIFA World Cup qualification
7	9 October 2025	Arena Națională, Bucharest, Romania	48	Moldova	2–1	2–1	Friendly
8	18 November 2025	Ilie Oană, Ploiești, Romania	51	San Marino	5–1	7–1	2026 FIFA World Cup qualification

== Honours ==
Viitorul Constanța

- Cupa României: 2018–19
- Supercupa României: 2019

Genk

- Belgian Super Cup: 2019

Rangers

- Scottish Premiership: 2020–21
- Scottish Cup: 2021–22
- Scottish League Cup: 2023–24, runner-up: 2022–23, 2024–25
- UEFA Europa League runner-up: 2021–22

Individual

- Gazeta Sporturilor Romanian Footballer of the Year runner-up: 2021; fourth place: 2020
- Liga I Team of the Season: 2017–18, 2018–19
- Liga I Team of the Regular Season: 2018–19
- Liga I Team of the Championship Play-Offs: 2017–18, 2018–19
- Rangers Young Player of the Year: 2020–21
