= Jean-François Gautier =

Jean-François Gautier (born 9 January 1950, Paris; died 6 December 2020) was a French philosopher, musicologist, etiopath, journalist, writer and editor.

His book L'Univers existe-t-il? (Does the Universe exist?) points out the impossibility of creating a descriptive geometry of The Universe when there is no other frame (i.e., a frame or tableau beyond, or outside of, The Universe as so-posited), within which to describe it. How can the description of The Universe begin when one cannot get 'outside' The Universe as posited? If we posit The Universe, we presume ourselves within it. Problems occur here: with the idea that the describer of The Universe can in some way "step beyond" the model he/she has projected.

== Publications ==
- Astronomie, Évreux, L'Atlas, 1983.
- Logique et pensée médicale, Paris, Avenir des Sciences, coll. « Précis d'étiopathie », 2002.
- With Christian Trédaniel, Médecine du XXI^{e} siècle : l'éthiopatie, La Maisnie, 1990.
- Le Syndrome cervico-nephro-viscéral, Paris, Avenir des Sciences, coll. « Précis d'étiopathie », 1990.
- Palestrina, ou l'esthétique de l'âme du monde, Arles, Actes Sud, 1993.
- L'univers existe-t-il ?, Arles, Actes Sud, 1994.
- Le système circulatoire : les cœurs périphériques, éd. Guy Trédaniel, 1995.
- Sur les délais de la justice divine, Arles, Actes Sud, 1995.
- L'Aventure des sciences, Paris, éd. du May, 1998.
- La sente s'efface, Paris, Le Temps qu'il fait, 1998.
- Claude Debussy : la musique et le mouvant, Arles, Actes Sud, 1999.
- Le sens de l'Histoire. Une histoire du messianisme en politique, Paris, Ellipses, 2013.
- À propos des dieux : l'esprit des polythéismes, Paris, La Nouvelle Librairie, coll. « Longue mémoire », 2020, 72 p.
