= Davitashvili =

Davitashvili (Georgian: დავითაშვილი) is a Georgian surname that may refer to

- Bagration-Davitashvili, Georgian noble family
- Alexander Davitashvili (born 1974), Georgian judoka
- Eugenia Davitashvili (1949–2015), Russian faith healer, writer and painter
- Koba Davitashvili (1971–2020), Georgian politician
- Zuriko Davitashvili (born 2001), Georgian football player
