= Runje =

Runje is a surname. Notable people with the surname include the following:

- Vedran Runje (born 1976), Croatian footballer
- Zlatko Runje (born 1979), Croatian footballer
- Ivan Runje (born 1990), Croatian footballer
