= Robert Răducanu =

Romanian footballer

Personal information
- Full name: Robert Dumitru Răducanu
- Date of birth: 5 September 1996 (age 30)
- Place of birth: Bucharest, Romania
- Height: 1.88 m (6 ft 2 in)
- Position: Striker

Team information
- Current team: Gloria Băneasa
- Number: 29

Youth career
- –2011: Steaua București
- 2011–2014: Concordia Chiajna

Senior career*
Years	Team	Apps	(Gls)
2015–2018	Concordia Chiajna	37	(1)
2018–2021	FC U Craiova	34	(6)
2021–2022	Universitatea Cluj	6	(0)
2022–2023	Popești-Leordeni	5	(0)
2023–	Gloria Băneasa	1	(0)
- * Club domestic league appearances and goals as of 21:39, 13 January 2024 (UTC)

Robert Dumitru Răducanu (born 5 September 1996 in Bucharest) is a Romanian footballer who plays as a striker for Gloria Băneasa.

== Honours ==
FC U Craiova 1948

- Liga II: 2020–21
- Liga III: 2019–20
