= Pawlik =

Pawlik (Polish pronunciation: [ˈpavlik]) is a surname. It is a diminutive of the Polish given name Paweł ("Paul"). Pawlik is related to the Czech surname Pavlík. Widely known as a Polish surname, it is associated with many religious beliefs, most commonly Christianity, however as it was a popular local name in areas with large Jewish populations (like Lesser Poland and Galicia), some individuals with the name have Jewish ancestry.

Notable people with the surname include:

== People ==
- Annemarie Pawlik (1938–2019), Austrian politician
- Bronisław Pawlik (1926–2002), Polish actor
- Eva Pawlik (1927–1983), Austrian figure skater
- Hans Peter Pawlik (died 2012), Austrian painter and author
- Jennifer Pawlik, American politician
- Joseph Richard Pawlik (born 1960), American marine biologist
- Katarzyna Pawlik (born 1989), Polish Paralympic swimmer
- Martina Pawlik (born 1969), German tennis player
- Michał Pawlik (born 1995), Polish footballer
- Włodzimierz Pawlik (born 1958), Polish jazz pianist and composer
